= Nuralkhan Kusherov =

Kazakh politician (born 1984)

Nūralhan Köşerov
- Нұралхан Көшеров
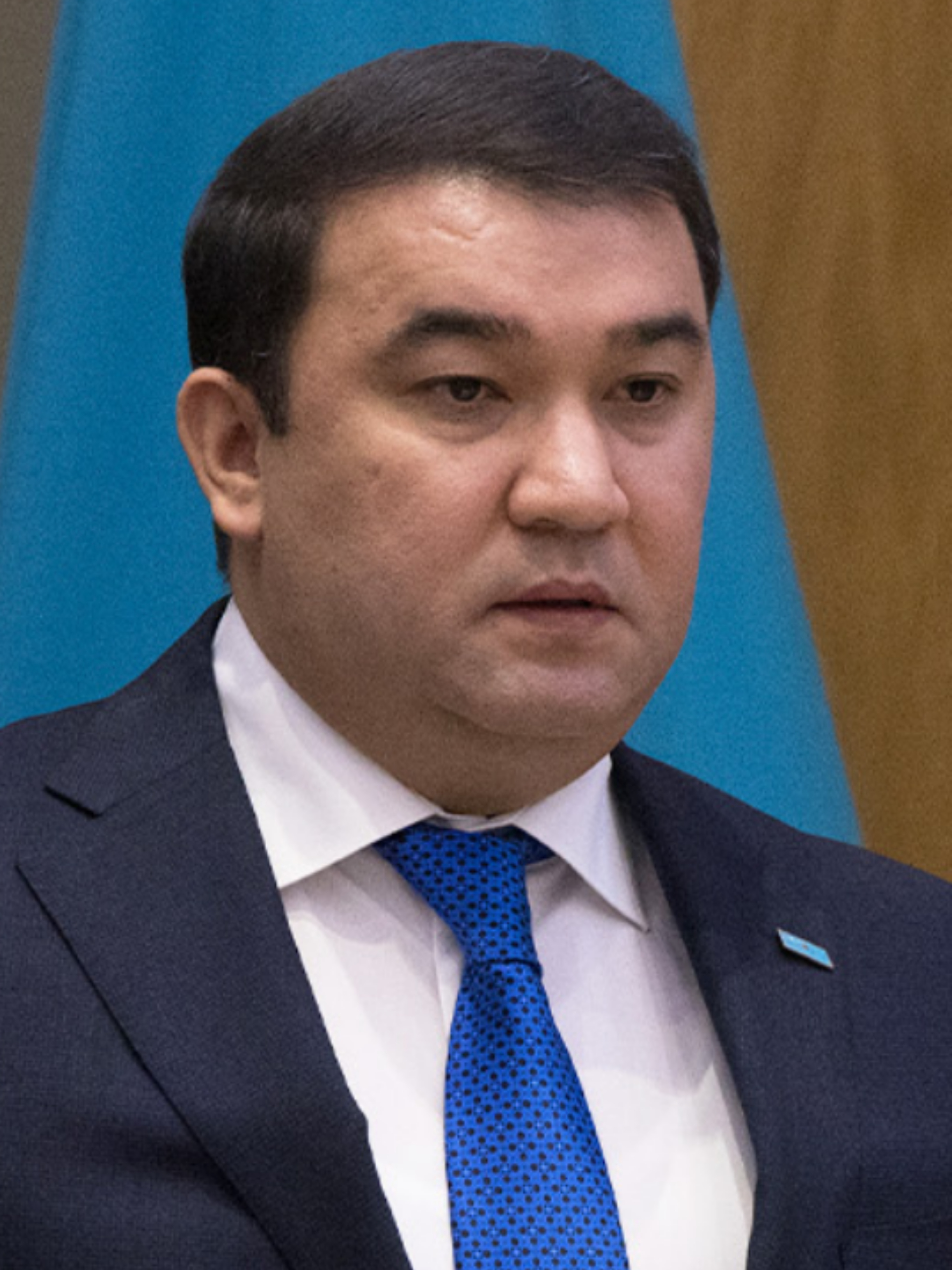
- Köşerov in 2025

Äkim of Turkistan Region
- Incumbent
- Assumed office 6 January 2025
- President: Kassym-Jomart Tokayev
- Preceded by: Darhan Satybaldy

Personal details
- Born: 20 December 1984 (age 41) Shymkent, Kazakh SSR, Soviet Union
- Education: Auezov South Kazakhstan State University; Kazakh Humanitarian Law University; Russian Presidential Academy of National Economy and Public Administration

Nūralhan Oralbaiūly Köşerov (Note: Often transliterated as Nuralkhan Oralbayevich Kusherov through a Russified Romanization of Нуралхан Оралбаевич Кушеров.) (Kazakh: Нұралхан Оралбайұлы Көшеров; born 20 December 1984) is a Kazakh economist and manager serving as the akim of Turkistan Region since 2025.

== Early life and education ==
Nuralkhan Kusherov was born on December 20, 1984, in the city of Shymkent, Kazakh Soviet Socialist Republic, Soviet Union (now Kazakhstan).

In 2005, he graduated from the Auezov South Kazakhstan State University with a degree in finance.

He studied at the Kazakh Humanitarian Law University (now Maqsut Narikbayev University) and received a law degree in 2007. He later earned a degree in state and municipal administration from the Russian Presidential Academy of National Economy and Public Administration in 2019.

== Early career ==
After graduating from Auezov South Kazakhstan State University in 2005, he worked at Bereke LLP as an accounting inspector and an economic inspector.

In 2007, after completing his studies at the Kazakh Humanitarian Law University, he served as an assistant to a member of the Mäjilis.

From 2008 to 2009 he worked at the Tax Committee of the Ministry of Finance as an expert in the Department for Explanations and Improvement of Tax Legislation.

In 2009 he joined the Tax Department of Almaty District as a chief specialist and later served in the Esil District Tax Department in the same capacity. A year later he remained with the Esil District Tax Department and became deputy head, initially acting in place of the incumbent who went on leave; he continued in that role until 2014.

In 2014 he was appointed deputy head of the city Tax Department, and until 2015 he served as deputy head of the Department of State Revenues for the Esil District.

== Political career ==
On October 13, 2015, he was appointed deputy akim of Shymkent under Ğabidolla Äbdırahimov, later Nurlan Sauranbaev.

He was relieved of that post in July 2018 and, one month later, moved to Aktau to head the Department of State Revenues.

Following that appointment, Kusherov led Departments of State Revenues from October 2018 to 2021 in Shymkent and from 2021 to 2023 in Atyrau Region.

On January 19, 2023, he transferred to Turkestan Region to serve as deputy akim Darhan Satybaldy.

On 6 January 2025, when akim Satybaldy joined the Presidential Administration and the akim post became vacant, Kusherov and Mukhit Turysbekov, akim of the Sozak District, were proposed as candidates for the post. Kusherov received 224 of 288 deputies votes and by president Tokayev's decree No. 761, he was appointed to the post.

== Personal life ==
Kusherov has no publicly available information about his personal life, and speaks Kazakh and Russian.
