= Danabek Isabekov =

Kazakh politician (born 1983)

- Данабек Исабеков
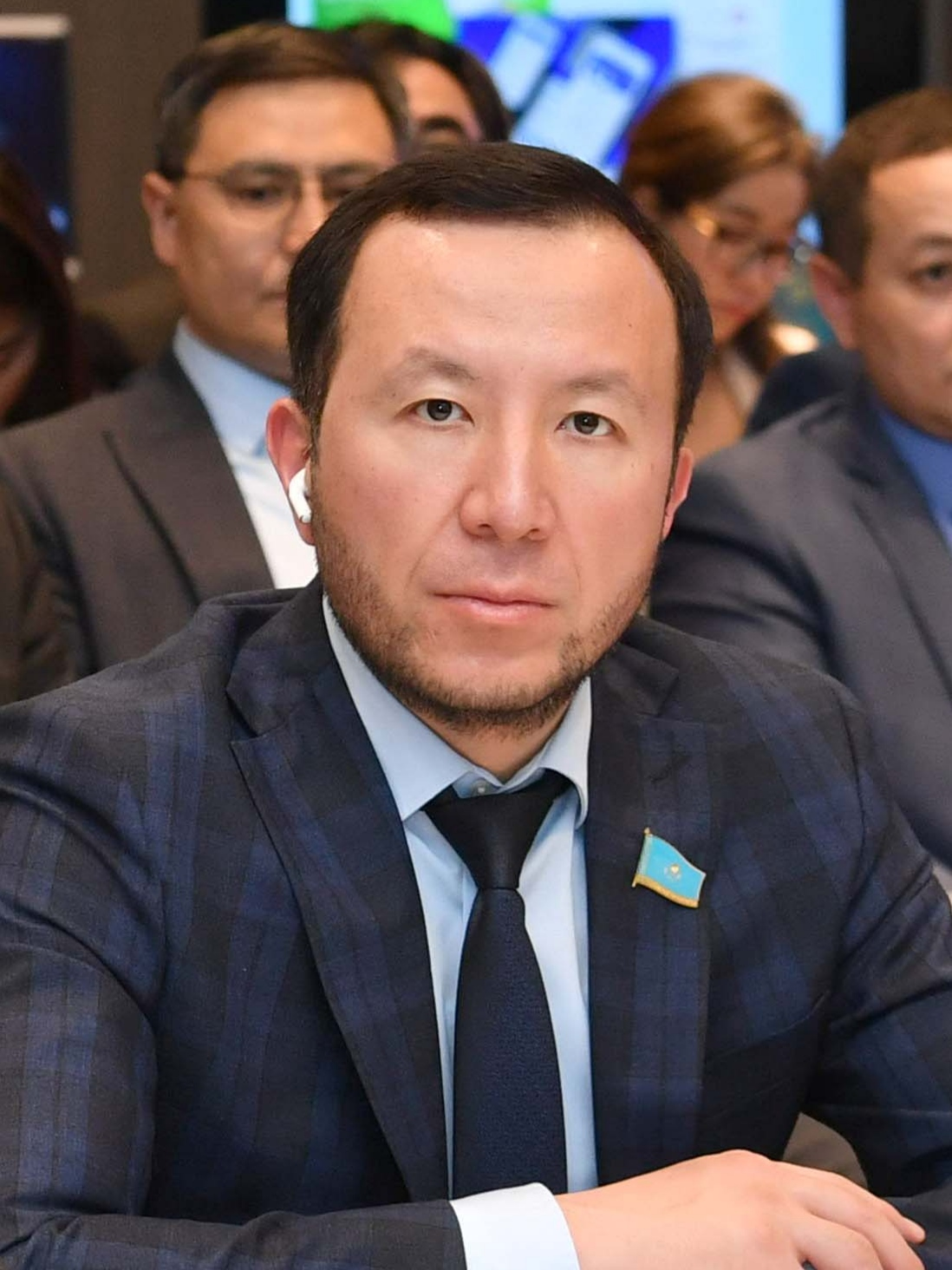
- Isabekov in 2023

Member of the Mäjilis
- In office 28 March 2023 – 1 July 2026
- Preceded by: Sergey Dyachenko (2004)
- Constituency: Almaty, No. 6

Member of the 7th Shymkent City Mäslihat
- In office 2021–2023

Personal details
- Born: 27 June 1983 (age 43) Jizzakh Region, Uzbek SSR, Soviet Union (Note: Some sources, such as the website online.zakon.kz and the government-affiliated online news source tengrinews report his birthplace to be the Kazakh SSR.)
- Party: Amanat

Danabek Erjanūly İsabekov (Kazakh: Данабек Ержанұлы Исабеков; born June 27, 1983) is a Kazakh politician, who has served as a Member of the Mäjilis since March 2023.

A member of the ruling Amanat party, Isabekov has previously served as Member of the municipal Shymkent City Mäslihat from 2021 to 2023 and has worked in numerous government-affiliated organizations.

== Early life and education ==
Born in Jizzakh Region of Soviet Uzbekistan on June 27, 1983, Isabekov got his first degree from Maqsut Narikbayev University in 2004, where he became a jurist. Later, in 2008, he ended his studies at Auezov South Kazakhstan State University, where he studied finance and land management. In 2016, Isabekov received his jurispudence diploma from the Shymkent Regional Social-Innovative University.

== Career ==
Isabekov began his professional carrer as a leading law consultant in the Shymkent City Chancellery Department in 2004. Later, he served as operator and archivist at the Tax Committee of the city. Starting from 2007, Isabekov has occupied several management positions, including as the General Director of the "MAD LTD and К" JSC and the Deputy Director and Director of the Jambyl and South Kazakhstan Regional departments of the "Real-estate Center" Republican State Enterprise.

From 2016 to 2023, Isabekov worked for the NJSC "Government for Citizens" State Corporation. In March 24, 2019, he was appointed as the director of the corporation's Shymkent Department.

In January 2021, Isabekov was elected a member of the Shymkent City Mäslihat and chairman of the Standing Committee on Legality, Law and order, and Local self-government. In the span of two years as local deputy, he answered 30 parliamentary inquiries.

=== Member of the Mäjilis ===
For the 2023 Kazakh legislative election, Isabekov, a member of the ruling Amanat party, ran for the Mäjilis seat from the 6th electoral district. In March 2023, Isabekov was elected as a Member of the Mäjilis, 8th convocation.

In September 2024, Isabekov urged that new regulations are made to the ambulances of the country. He claimed that they were not arriving as fast as they were supposed to, and has shared that his father died because of the fact. He then compared Kazakh ambulance arrival times and regulations to the ones in the United States, Canada, New Zealand, Austria, and Ireland. He was also for easing the punishment for people that leave recreational drug cache, a practice created by drug dealers as to keep their anonymity and done by paid or tricked laymen.

== Personal life ==
Isabekov is married, and has 5 children. Isabekov is ethnically Kazakh.
