= Nurlan Beknazarov =

Kazakh politician (born 1964)

MP Nurlan Beknazarov
- Нұрлан Бекназаров
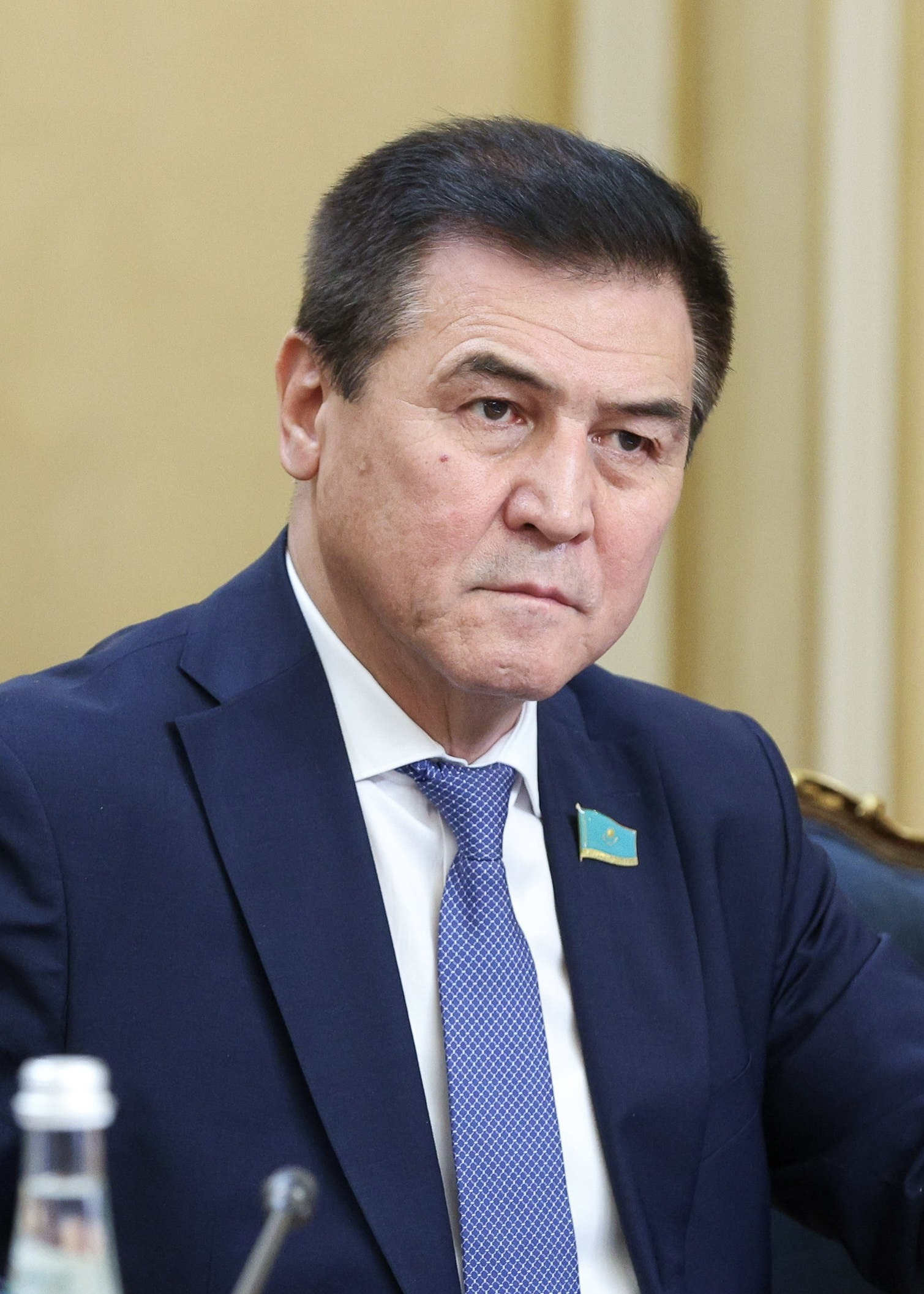
- Beknazarov in 2026

Deputy Chairman of the Kurultai
- Incumbent
- Assumed office 28 August 2026 Serving with Dania Espaeva, Dinara Zakieva
- Chairman: Aibek Dädebai
- Preceded by: Office established

Member of the Kurultai
- Incumbent
- Assumed office 27 August 2026
- Party list: Ädilet
- Preceded by: Office established

Senator for Shymkent
- In office 9 October 2018 – 1 July 2026 Serving with Darhan Satybaldy (2018–2019) and Aygül Qapbarova (2019–2026)
- Preceded by: Office established
- Succeeded by: Parliament abolished

Member of Shymkent City Mäslihat
- In office 1999–2018

Personal details
- Born: 12 June 1964 (age 62) Shymkent, Kazakh SSR, Soviet Union
- Party: Ädilet
- Other political affiliations: Nur Otan (formerly); Amanat (until 2026)
- Children: 4
- Education: Alma-Ata People's Agricultural Institute; Auezov South Kazakhstan State University
- Awards: Order of the Leopard III Degree; Order of Parasat; Order of Kurmet

Nūrlan Qūdiarūly Beknazarov (Note: Often transliterated as Nurlan Kudiyarovich Beknazarov through a Russified Romanization of Нурлан Кудиярович Бекназаров.) (Kazakh: Нұрлан Құдиярұлы Бекназаров; born 12 June 1964) is a Kazakh politician serving as the Deputy Chairman of the Kurultai and member of the Kurultai since 2026. Previously, he was senator from Shymkent from 2018 to 2026 and member of Shymkent City Mäslihat from 1999 to 2018.

== Early life and education ==
Beknazarov was born on 12 June 1964, in Shymkent, Soviet Kazakhstan.

He studied at the Alma-Ata People's Agricultural Institute, receiving a degree as an engineer-economist in 2003, and later earned a degree in financial economist from Auezov South Kazakhstan State University.

== Early career ==
In 1984, at the age of 18, Beknazarov began working at the Kazhymukan Stadium in his hometown, Shymkent. Between 1984 and 1992, he progressed from methodologist and engineer to chief engineer, deputy director, and finally director of the stadium.

From 1992 to 1996, he served as head of the South Kazakhstan Regional (now Turkistan Regional) Department for Credit Insurance and Investment, then became first deputy general director of the regional state insurance company.

From 1996 to 2003, Beknazarov was deputy director and later vice-president of JSC Senim, LLP Sanur, and a branch of Transoil JSC.

== Political career ==
Following the 1999 legislative elections, Beknazarov was elected to the second convocation of the Shymkent City Mäslihat. In 2003, he was appointed chair of the Maslihat's audit commission. On 21 June 2011, Beknazarov was elected the chairman with the support of 19 of 23 members.

In June 2018, Shymkent was granted the status of a city of republican significance, which entitled it to two senators. On 13 August, Beknazarov and Darhan Satybaldy were nominated as Senate candidates from Shymkent. At the time of election, Beknazarov was a member of Nur Otan. The election was held on 5 October; both candidates won and were officially registered as senators from Shymkent on 9 October. As a result, Beknazarov's maslihat mandate ended.

On 25 January 2023, following Senate election, he was re-elected as a senator from Shymkent. In the new convocation, he became secretary of the Senate Committee on Constitutional Legislation, the Judicial System and Law Enforcement Agencies, and on 28 September of the same year he was appointed its chairman.

After President Kassym-Jomart Tokayev proposed abolishing the Senate and moving to a unicameral parliament in 2025, Beknazarov was included in the working group on parliamentary reform.

On 21 January 2026, after Tokayev stated that a transition to a unicameral parliament would require a completely new constitution, Beknazarov joined the Commission on Constitutional Reform. As a result of its work, a referendum on a new Constitution was held on 15 March 2026; the Constitution was approved and entered into force on 1 July of the same year. Under its provisions, the bicameral parliament of Kazakhstan was replaced by a unicameral Kurultai, and the mandates of sitting parliamentarians were automatically terminated.

In the first Kurultai elections held on 23 August 2026, the Adilet party, of which Beknazarov is a member, won 71% of the vote. On 27 August, he was registered as a member of the 1st Kurultai. On 28 August, at the first session of the Kurultai, Beknazarov was elected deputy chair of Aibek Dädebai.

== Personal life ==
Beknazarov is married and has four children, one of whom, his daughter Baljan, died in 2024. He also has grandchildren.

== Awards and honors ==
- Order of the Leopard III Degree (2016).
- Order of Parasat (2021).
- Order of Kurmet (2021).
- Medal "10 Years of the Constitution of Kazakhstan".
- Medal "20 Years of the Constitution of Kazakhstan".
- Medal "25 Years of the Constitution of Kazakhstan".
- Medal "30 Years of the Constitution of Kazakhstan".
- Medal "20 Years of Independence of Kazakhstan".
- Medal "25 Years of Independence of Kazakhstan".
- Medal "30 Years of Independence of Kazakhstan".
- Medal "20 Years of the Maslihats of Kazakhstan".
- Medal "30 Years of the Maslihats of Kazakhstan".
- Honorary Citizen of Shymkent.
- Honorary Lawyer of Kazakhstan.
- Honorary member of Maslihats of Kazakhstan.
