= Nūrjan Ältaev =

Kazakh politician

- Нұржан Әлтаев
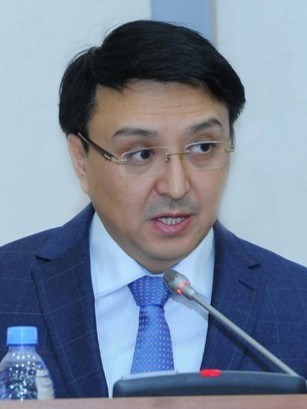
- Altayev in 2017

Leader of El Tıregı
- Incumbent
- Assumed office 27 November 2020

Member of the Mäjilis from Nur Otan party list
- In office 12 February 2019 – 2 December 2020

Vice Minister of Agriculture
- In office 2017–2018
- President: Nursultan Nazarbaev
- Prime Minister: Bakhytjan Sagintayev

Personal details
- Born: 13 October 1978 (age 47) Shardara, Kazakh SSR, Soviet Union
- Party: El Tıregı (2020–present)
- Other political affiliations: Nur Otan (until 2020)
- Children: 2
- Education: Auezov South Kazakhstan State University; Almaty Management University

Nūrjan Bauyrjanūly Ältaev (Kazakh: Нұржан Бауыржанұлы Әлтаев, Russian: Нуржан Бауыржанович Алтаев; born 13 October 1978) is a Kazakh politician who served as a member of the Mazhilis from 2019 until 2020. He is also the founder and leader of the El Tıregı political party since December 2020.

== Early life and career ==
Nurjan Altaev was born to a Muslim Kazakh family in the town of Shardara in South Kazakhstan Region. In 2004, Altaev graduated from the Auezov South Kazakhstan State University with a bachelors in law. In 2012, he graduated from the Academic Innovation University, and in 2019, from the Almaty Management University as a Doctor of Business Administration (DBA).

In 2005, Ältaev became the head of the Department for International Cooperation and Interdepartmental Coordination of the Ministry of Internal Affairs. Over the course of the next 10 years, Ältaev worked in many administrative and business positions. Amongst these positions were member of the Board of Directors of Shymkent International Airport and member of the Board of the management board of KazAgro.

== Political career ==
In 2017, Ältaev was appointed as a Vice Minister of Agriculture of Kazakhstan. A year later, he was appointed to the post of Vice Minister of Labour and Social Protection.

On 12 February 2019, he became a member of the Mazhilis for the ruling Nur Otan party where he served as in the Committee on Agrarian Issues. During his term as a parliamentarian, Ältaev reportedly grew frustration over the government over its lack of response in the explosive accident in the town of Arys and the COVID-19 pandemic. Serving as a chairman of the board of El Tıregı Union of Industrialists and Entrepreneurs from October 2019, he challenged the Nur Otan on broad of proposed political reforms that were made by the El Tıregı faction in which he urged for the party to adopt. From there, expressed the possibility in forming his own party if the Nur Otan would refuse to further implement the so-needed reforms.

Shortly after not being included in the Nur Otan party list for the 2021 legislative elections, Ältaev on 27 November 2020 announced his intent to form a new political party which would be founded on the basis of the El Tıregı principles, claiming that him not being included in the list was due to his often merit criticism of the government. He stressed that Kazakhstan's sovereignty was failing with its neighbouring countries taking advantage and that the country is rooted with corruption with 55% of its wealth being concentrated in the hands of 162 people and that there were no true opposition parties. He also asserted that his new party would not participate in the upcoming Mazhilis elections citing the reason for little preparation time that the elections should not end the activities of party which "should be with the people and must show it". Just the following days later on 30 November, the Nur Otan Party Control Committee revoked Ältaev's membership in which according to the party's committee chairman Pavel Kazantsev, was due to "committing acts that discredit the Nur Otan party and harm its interests, expressed in a number of public statements, including the intention to create a new political party." On 2 December 2020, the Central Election Commission terminated Ältaev's lawmaking powers, thus ending his term as a Mazhilis MP.

After being revoked from his MP membership, Ältaev announced that newly formed political party El Tıregı would compete with Nur Otan and from there he accused all other contesting parties in the 2021 legislative elections as being "daughters of Nur Otan", and stated his willingness to work with the new party.

On 8 September 2021, Ältaev was detained by police after taking part in an anti-government protest in Nur-Sultan after calling for the resignation for officials and an end in mandatory COVID-19 vaccinations.

On 21 November 2023, a court in Astana sentenced Nurjan Ältaev to 10 years in prison with life deprivation of the right to hold positions in public service. The court found him guilty of taking a bribe on a particularly large scale.

== Political positions ==
Ältaev is viewed according to numerous figures and analysts to be a right-wing populist with Kazakh nationalist sentiments.

=== Russia ===
Since becoming more active in politics, Ältaev has increasingly spoken out against Russian nationalists as well as the use of Russian language in Kazakhstan.

In an interview to Govorit Mosvka radio station, Ältaev accused of Russians speaking offensively against the Kazakhs, adding that the controversies sometimes happen in around the state of alcoholic intoxication although adding that interethnic conflicts should be dealt by law enforcement.

In August 2021, Ältaev published a video from where he threatened Russian lawmakers to be "put in the steppe".

== Awards ==
- Medal "For excellent service in ensuring law and order" (MVD)
- Medal "20 years of Independence of the Republic of Kazakhstan"
- Medal "For loyalty to the cause" III degree
- Medal "Batyr Shapagaty"
- Medal "10th anniversary of KAZENERGY"
- Medal "25 years of Independence of the Republic of Kazakhstan"
- People's Favorite Parliamentarian of the Year 2019
