= Chaudhry Chandu Lal =

Pakistani politician and lawyer

Chaudhry Chandu Lal Sundar Das was a Pakistani politician and lawyer who served as the 2nd Deputy Speaker of the Provincial Assembly of the Punjab between 1951 and 1955.

Das was to born into a Christian family.
