= Arman Zhetpisbayev =

Former mayor of Shymkent, Kazakhstan

Arman Sharipbayuly Zhetpisbayev

Akim of Shymkent
- In office February, 2008 – 24 April 2012

Personal details
- Born: 24 April 1971 (age 55) Kuybyshev Village, Zhambyl District, Zhambyl Province

Arman Sharipbayuly Zhetpisbayev (Kazakh: Арман Шәріпбайұлы Жетпісбаев, Arman Şärıpbaiūly Jetpısbaev) is the former mayor of Shymkent, Kazakhstan from the year 2008 to 2012.

== Biography ==
Arman Zhetpisbayev was born on 24 April 1971 in Kuybyshev village, Zhambyl District, Zhambyl Province, Kazakh SSR.

In 1993, has graduated faculty "Industrial and civil building" in Auezov South Kazakhstan State University, where he's got qualification as the civil engineer.

In 2002, has graduated the Kazakh Economic University named of Turar Ryskulov on speciality "The Finances and credit", where he's got qualification as the economist.

His labour way begun since 1992 as mason in a small enterprise of "Stroyinvest", in 1994–1998 years he worked in various commercial organisations: as director of firm «Mr. D & K», director of Kazakh-Korean joint venture "Shymkent-Telbone", director of research-&-production enterprise "Energotechservice", director of Open Company "Interservice", since 1998 - as vice-president of JSC «Autoservice and trade», as vice-president of JSC "Alaugaz", then as director of Open Company "Alautransgaz", since 1999 - as director of JSC "Yuzhgaz", as director of Open Company "Shymkentgaz".

Since July, 1999 till April, 2000 - deputy director of Shymkent branch of Open Society "Kazkommertsbank".

In 2002-2003 - director of Kyzylorda branch of Open Society "Kazkommertsbank", the first deputy of board chairman of JSC "Kazkommertsbank".

In 2003-2005 - chief executive of Open Society "ARNA Corporation", later as chairman of directors board of JSC "ARNA Corporation".

In 2005-2006 - director of state organization «Management of Special Economic Zone «Ontustik».

In 2006-2008 - akim assistant of South Kazakhstan Province

February, 2008–24, April, 2012 - Akim of Shymkent city.
