= Gabit Syzdykbekov =

Kazakh politician (born 1980)

Ğabit Syzdyqbekov
- Ғабит Сыздықбеков
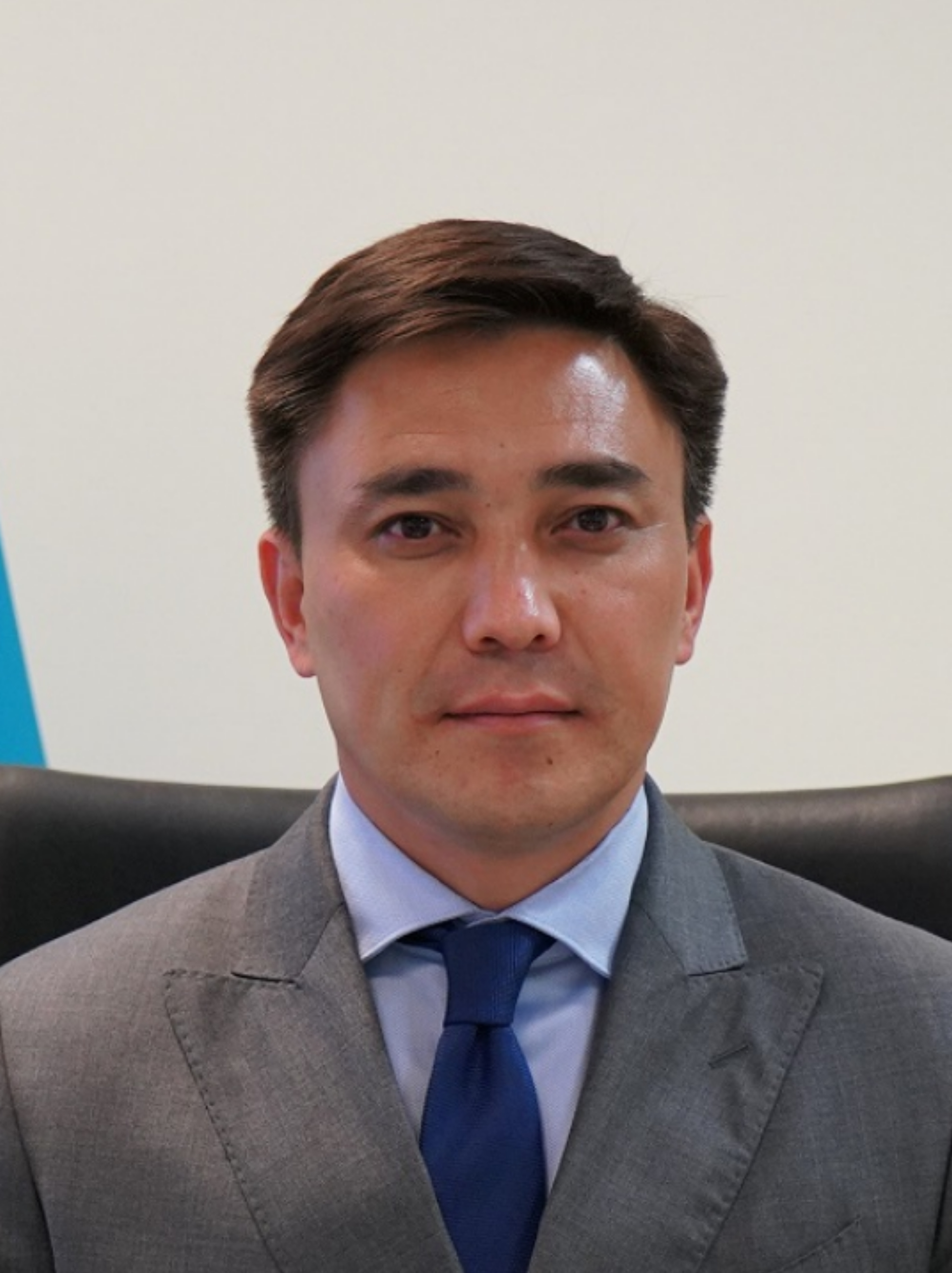
- Syzdyqbekov in 2021

Äkim of Shymkent
- Incumbent
- Assumed office 5 September 2023
- President: Kassym-Jomart Tokayev
- Preceded by: Murat Aitenov

Kazakh ambassador to Serbia
- In office 30 September 2019 – 2 July 2021
- President: Kassym-Jomart Tokayev
- Preceded by: Nurbaq Rustemov
- Succeeded by: Madi Atamqulov

Personal details
- Born: 8 July 1980 (age 45) Shymkent, Kazakh SSR, Soviet Union
- Education: Diplomatic Academy of the Ministry of Foreign Affairs of the Russian Federation
- Alma mater: Kazakh Humanitarian Law University
- Awards: Order of Parasat

Ğabit Abdimajitūly Syzdyqbekov (Note: Often transliterated as Gabit Abdimazhitovich Syzdykbekov through a Russified Romanization of Габит Абдимажитович Сыздыкбеков.) (Kazakh: Ғабит Әбдімажитұлы Сыздықбеков; born 8 July 1980) is a Kazakh lawyer and diplomat who has served as akim of Shymkent since 2023. He previously worked as ambassador to Serbia from 2019 to 2021.

== Early life and education ==
Gabit Abdimajituly Syzdykbekov was born on 8 July 1980 in the city of Shymkent, Kazakh Soviet Socialist Republic, Soviet Union (now Kazakhstan).

In 2001, he graduated from the Kazakh Humanitarian Law University (now Maqsut Narikbayev University) with a degree in law. He studied at the Diplomatic Academy of the Ministry of Foreign Affairs of the Russian Federation and received a degree in international relations in 2003.

== Early career ==
After graduating from the Diplomatic Academy in Russia in 2004, he returned to Kazakhstan and joined the Ministry of Foreign Affairs. He served in the State Protocol Service as an attaché, then as Third Secretary in the Department of Europe and the Americas, and later as Second Secretary in the Chancellery.

In 2007, he moved to the Senate of the Parliament, where he was appointed a senior specialist in the chairman's Secretariat. He subsequently led the Senate Office's Unit for Interaction with the Committee on International Relations, Defence and Security.

In 2011, he became head of the South Asia and Middle East Division within the Ministry's Department of Asia and Africa. After about a year in that post, he was posted to Kazakhstan's embassy in France as an adviser.

Upon returning to Kazakhstan, he served until 2017 as an adviser to the Director of the Department of Administration and Control at the Ministry of Foreign Affairs. He then rejoined the Senate as an adviser to Senate chairman Kassym-Jomart Tokayev and again headed the Office's Unit for Interaction with the Committee on International Relations, Defence and Security.

== Political career ==
In May 2019, he was appointed Ambassador for Special Assignments at the Ministry of Foreign Affairs.

On 30 September of the same year, President Tokayev appointed him as ambassador to Serbia. On 2 July 2021, he was relieved of the post.

Two weeks later, on 14 July, Prime Minister Asqar Mamin appointed him first deputy head of the Prime Minister's Chancellery under Galymzhan Koishybayev. On 2 January 2023, the Chancellery was renamed the Government Apparatus, and three months later, on 5 September, he was relieved of the post.

=== Akim of Shymkent ===
On the same day in Shymkent, Prime Minister Älihan Smaiylov presented President Tokayev's proposal to consider the candidacies of Syzdykbekov and Al‑Farabi District akim Rashid Mynbaev for the position of city akim (governor). A total of 19 of the 29 city maslikhat deputies voted for Syzdykbekov, while 10 supported Mynbaev, and by Tokayev's decree No. 345, Syzdykbekov was appointed to the post.

== Personal life ==
Syzdykbekov has no publicly available information about his personal life. He is a polyglot and speaks Kazakh, Russian, English, Turkish, and French.

== Honours ==
- Order of Parasat (2024)

=== Ranks ===
- Advisor 2nd class
