= Kazakhstan–Uzbekistan relations =

- Kazakhstan: Uzbekistan

Kazakhstan–Uzbekistan relations refers to the relations between the neighbouring Republic of Kazakhstan and Republic of Uzbekistan. Kazakhstan has an embassy in Tashkent and a Consulate General in Samarkand. Uzbekistan has an embassy in Astana and have Consulates General in Almaty and Aktau.

Bilateral relations were elevated from a strategic partnership to an alliance in 2021.

== Historical relations ==
=== Ancient to medieval era ===
Both Kazakhs and Uzbeks are descended from the ancient Kipchaks and Karluks, who also turned to be descendants of the ancient Western Turkic Khaganate's Turkic peoples that split off early. Both groups lived together as neighbours as the Kipchaks aligned with the Kimeks and later Cumans, while the Karluks established the Kara-Khanid Khanate; their relationship was complex and frequently involved competitions against each other for domination in Central Asia.

However, it was the Mongol conquest at the 13th century that permanently divided their identities into two separate groups. Though both Kipchaks and Karluks went under the Mongols and underwent Mongolisation in term of culture, the Mongol influence was very deep among the Kipchaks due to the Golden Horde; while the Karluks under Chagatai Khanate, despite also being influenced by Mongols, borrowed stronger Persianate, Chinese and even partial Indian influence. The result was the post-Mongol emergences of modern Kipchak and Karluk identities; despite reversed Turkification, the Mongol influence and heritage manage to survive deep among Kipchaks, but not the Karluks.

But it was the brutal Kipchak–Karluk War between Tokhtamysh (leader of Golden Horde) and Timur (founder of Timurid Empire) that proved to be the final blow. During this ten-year long war, the Karluk Gurkani Empire ravaged much of the Golden Horde, and finally decimated much of the Kipchak livelihood to a point the Horde never recovered. This resulted in the expulsion of much of the Kipchak population from Central Asia, as the Karluk Turks established themselves as the most powerful Turkic people of Central Asia, laying ground for cultural domination of the Karluk population and emergence of modern Uzbeks, Uyghurs, as well as the future Mughal Empire (also founded by a Karluk Prince). Some branch of Kipchaks that opted to stay in Central Asia founded the Kazakh Khanate, laying ground for the emergences of modern Kazakh, Karakalpak, and Kyrgyz peoples. Interestingly, a Kipchak tribe went on to become the Shaybanids, but they underwent massive Karlukification and thus lost their Kipchak origin.

==== Kazakh independence from Uzbek control ====
The Timurid Empire's fragmentation later on and foundations of various Uzbek states, notably the Uzbek Khanate, didn't erode the dominant role of the Uzbeks, as the Uzbek rulers continued their oppressive policies on Kazakh nomads that began under the reign of Timur. This ultimately paved way for resentment from the Kazakhs against the Uzbeks, ultimately caused a war that lasted for three decades before finally, the Kazakhs restored their control over the steppe of Eurasia by 1500. This war was significant, as it puts the final end of the first Gurkani Empire by 1507 as the Uzbeks lost a significant amount of income in the north.

==== Post-Kazakh independence ====
Despite the fall of the Timurid Empire, the Uzbek domination of Central Asia was already consolidated, though with a power reduced than before, despite the Uzbek conquerors had attempted to revive their power following the establishment of the Gurkani realm in India. Meanwhile, the Kazakh Khanate later proved unstable and later divided into three juzes. Relations between various smaller Uzbek Khanates and the Mughal toward Kipchak population varied over time, but largely with indifference and ignorance; though the violent chapter came during the early 19th century when the Kokand Khanate under Muhammad Khudayar Khan ordered total persecution of all Kipchaks, be it Kazakhs or Kyrgyz. This act was later exploited by the emerging Russian Empire, which later conquered much of Central Asia.

=== Tsarist and Soviet rule ===
The Tsarist rule initially brought very little change and the Russians largely left the locals alone, though the Russians chose Tashkent (future capital of Uzbekistan) to be the capital of Russian rule, which would continue under the Soviets later. But in 1916, when the World War I did not go well for the Russians, the Tsar ordered a complete mobilisation of Central Asian Muslims, including Kazakhs and Uzbeks, resulted in the widespread Basmachi Revolt that was not crushed until the Soviet Union's rise in 1920s.

During the 1930s, Joseph Stalin triggered the delimitation of nationalities in Central Asia, carving modern border of both Uzbekistan and Kazakhstan. However, the Kazakhs were largely perished during the devastating Kazakh famine of 1930–1933, and many Kazakhs fled to Uzbekistan, which was far less affected by the famine. Moreover, during World War II, Kazakhs were disproportionally recruited by the Soviets to fight, which further decimated the Kazakh population. Later on, Kazakhstan became the dumping ground for the Soviet nuclear programs, and the destruction of Aral Sea (also occurred in Uzbekistan's Karakalpakstan, a Kipchak autonomous state), further devastated the Kazakhs. By contrast, the Uzbek core, being the heartland, had been largely spared from the Soviet disastrous engineering projects, contributed to the reason why Uzbekistan won independence with a stable population dominated by Uzbeks, but Kazakhstan's demographic and social disasters took longer to recover.

=== Post-Soviet Union ===
Both Kazakhstan and Uzbekistan were part of the Soviet Union before its official dissolution in 1991. In 2017, President Shavkat Mirziyoyev began to improve relations with Kazakhstan. 2018 was declared the "Year of Uzbekistan in Kazakhstan". On 27 November 2018, the President Nursultan Nazarbayev said: "Today our relationship is at a good level. We meet with Shavkat Mirziyoyev several times a year and discuss all pressing issues in the field of economic and political cooperation".

On 20 March 2025, Kazakh Deputy Prime Minister and Foreign Minister Murat Nurtleu met with Uzbek Foreign Minister Bakhtiyor Saidov in Khiva to discuss interregional ties, transport, and logistics, particularly through the Middle Corridor initiative.

== Political relations ==
=== Visits ===
Former Uzbek President of Uzbekistan Islam Karimov has visited Kazakhstan several times. The same can also be said for former Kazakh president Nursultan Nazarbayev visiting Tashkent. On 15 April 2019, the Kazakh President Kassym-Jomart Tokayev and Mirziyoyev opened the Year of Kazakhstan in Uzbekistan during the former's visit to Tashkent. Tokayev noted that "We are connected by a single language, religion, common history and one destiny. Our peoples are the heirs of the ancient and great civilization of Central Asia".

On 29 March 2025, Uzbek President Shavkat Mirziyoyev visited Almaty for informal talks with Kazakh President Kassym-Jomart Tokayev. The leaders discussed political, economic, transport, investment, energy, and cultural ties, emphasizing their strategic partnership. Tokayev highlighted the importance of bilateral relations for regional stability, while Mirziyoyev noted their effectiveness in resolving issues.

On 16 November 2025, President of Kazakhstan Kassym-Jomart Tokayev visited Uzbekistan and held high-level talks with President of Uzbekistan Shavkat Mirziyoyev. Kazakh President was awarded with Uzbekistan’s Highest Friendship Order by his Uzbek counterpart.

== Military relations ==
Kazakhstan and Uzbekistan have steadily deepened military cooperation since gaining independence, signing agreements on flight safety, air defense, military intelligence, education, and the military-technical sphere. Since 2021, they have conducted joint exercises such as Kalkan, Hamkorlik, Khanjar, and Birlestik-2024, which included forces from other regional states. The two countries also organize joint sniper and survival training, promote military cultural exchanges, and collaborate on defense education, with personnel studying and teaching across institutions.

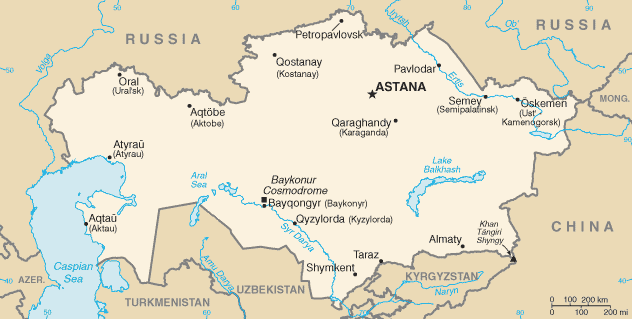
Map of Kazakhstan with Uzbekistan to the south

=== Kazakhstan–Uzbekistan border ===
At the start of the 21st century, 96% of the international border between Uzbekistan and Kazakhstan had been determined. In 2001, after mutual agreements, the border line in only three disputed areas (Bagys, Arnasai and Nsan) remained undrawn. By September 2002, Kazakhstan and Uzbekistan had fully resolved the course of their 2,440 km-long shared border. On March 28, 2023, both countries finally ratified the border demarcation treaties.

On 19 October 2006, Kazakhstan built 45 km-long barrier along part of its border with Uzbekistan. The Kazakhstan–Uzbekistan barrier spans the Saryagash and Maktaaral administrative districts of southern Kazakhstan, and consists of a 2,5m-high barbed wire fence that includes searchlights. The barrier is situated along the heavily populated towns and cities of eastern Uzbekistan. It was built to curb drug smuggling across the border.

== Economic relations ==
In 2025, Kazakhstan launched the Kazakhstan Trade Pavilion in the Airitom free economic zone in Termez to boost trade, including with Afghanistan. Key areas of cooperation include water and energy projects, notably the Kambar-Ata-1 hydroelectric power plant.

== Cultural relations ==
=== Education ===
Educational ties expanded in 2025, with Kazakh and Uzbek university branches such as Auezov South Kazakhstan State University in Chirchik and the Tashkent Institute of Irrigation and Agricultural Mechanization Engineers in Almaty.

== Ambassadors ==
=== Ambassadors of Kazakhstan to Uzbekistan ===
- Saylau Batyrsha-uly (1993-1994)
- Nazhameden Iskaliev (1994-1997)
- Umirzak Uzbekov (1997-2003)
- Tleukhan Kabdrakhmanov (2003-2006)
- Askar Myrzakhmetov (2006-2007)
- Zautbek Turisbekov (2007-2009)
- Boribay Zheksembin (2010-2015)
- Yerik Utembayev (2016-2019)
- Darkhan Satybaldy (since 2019)

=== Ambassadors of Uzbekistan in Kazakhstan ===
- Ikrom Nazarov (2016-2018)
- Saidikram Niyazkhodzhaev (since 2018)

== See also ==
- Foreign relations of Kazakhstan
- Foreign relations of Uzbekistan
