= El Tıregı =

Support of the Nation El Tıregı Ел тірегі
- Abbreviation: El Tıregı (official); ET (unofficial)
- Leader: Nurzhan Altayev
- Secretary: Muminov Nodirshokh
- Founded: 2 October 2019; 5 years ago (as public association); 27 November 2020; 4 years ago (as political party)
- Split from: Nur Otan
- Headquarters: Astana
- Ideology: National liberalism Social economy
- Political position: Centre-right to right-wing
- National affiliation: Coalition of Democratic Forces (2022–present)
- Colors: Orange; White
- Slogan: Күшті Қазақстан—Күшті Ұлт ("Strong Kazakhstan—Strong Nation")

Website
- www.eltiregi.kz

El Tıregı (Kazakh: Ел тірегі, lit. 'Support of the Nation', ET) is an unregistered political party in Kazakhstan that was founded on 27 November 2020 by former Mazhilis MP and Vice Minister Nurzhan Altayev. Originally formed as a public association in October 2019, the organisation sought to influence governmental policies within the ruling Amanat party and was eventually transformed to a political party after a series of disagreements between association's chairman Altayev's proposed reforms and the Amanat, with him eventually being deprived of the party membership after threatening to form his own separate faction.

The party aims to compete with Amanat and outlined support in the country's civil rights, freedom of speech, improving quality of life and ending corruption.

== History ==
=== Union of Industrialists and Entrepreneurs ===
The party was originally established on 2 October 2019 in Nur-Sultan as the El Tıregı Union of Industrialists and Entrepreneurs which served as basis for a cooperative alliance of domestic enterprises which included 400 businesses in industry, agriculture, education and after-sales services, employing a total of 18,000 persons from all over Kazakhstan. The union's governing bodies included several prominent figures which were businessmen in which were part of the National Council of Public Trust, Parliament MP's as well as members of the expert organisations. The union outlined its interest in support domestic industrialists and work together to develop measures to improve conditions, further develop manufacturing and entrepreneurship by influencing the government's decision through political means. At the presentation, chairman of the El Tıregı Kazakhstan Association of Small and Medium Businesses and Mazhilis MP Nurzhan Altayev stressed that "business should be a driver of change not only in the economy, but also in the development of education, the formation of legal, civil society."

In September 2020, the union proposed a series of political reforms in response to economic crisis that was happening in Kazakhstan amidst the COVID-19 pandemic. The organisation called for a commission to investigate the situation of coronavirus and that it should include independent citizens. From there, Union chairman Nurzhan Altayev announced his intent to form an open platform between the citizens and state agencies named "Halyq Project" and called on the authorities to restore public confidence. During that period, Altayev expressed the possibility of the union becoming its own political party if the ruling Nur Otan would adhere in implementing El Tıregı's proposed reforms although he still stated his confidence that the organisation's voice would be heard by the government and be implemented.

=== Partification ===
On 27 November 2020 at the union meeting, chairman Nurzhan Altayev announced that the association would transform into a political party, citing the need for a real opposition party in the country in which he claimed that the El Tıregı would become the "party of justice" and gain its popularity due to a public demand of justice.

After being revoked from the Nur Otan party membership as well as from the Mazhilis, Altayev on 2 December 2020 revealed that the El Tıregı had sent documents to Ministry of Justice for registration and that the party would hold a congress after receiving response from the Ministry although not ruling out whether its registration would be accepted or not. He also outlined the position for the party to oppose Nur Otan if the party would in fact be registered. On 6 January 2021, the Ministry of Justice refused the party's registration request, claiming that the El Tıregı had allegedly garnered signatures of "deceased and persons with unidentified status". According to Altayev, the Justice Ministry had rejected the El Tıregı's registration three times, telling that the authorities are not ready for "real political changes".

On 21 January 2021, the El Tıregı announced that it would form a Shadow Cabinet in which it would be open to all citizens, as well as registered and unregistered parties and organisations whom can also nominated the candidates for the cabinet post.

The El Tıregı held its first unsanctioned protest on 25 June 2021 in Nur-Sultan along with the Veterans Union. From there, the party's activists and military personnel marched to the House of Ministries chanting party's slogan, calling on resignations of Justice Minister Marat Beketayev and Defence Minister Nurlan Yermekbayev as well as the registration of the party.

== Policies ==
The party has outlined its platforms on the direct elections of akims (local heads) in all levels, separation of judicial branch from the government, higher birth rates, economic freedom as well support for universal basic income. The legislative structure, the El Tıregı proposed for a unicameral Parliament in which parallel voting system would be in place where 50% of MPs would be elected from electoral districts.
