= Darhan Satybaldy =

Kazakh politician and diplomat (born 1974)

- Дархан Сатыбалды
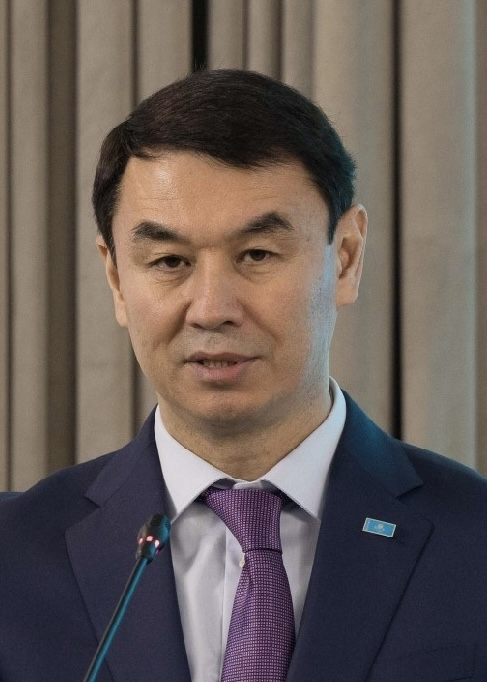
- Satybaldy in 2025

Äkim of Almaty
- Incumbent
- Assumed office 24 May 2025
- Preceded by: Erbolat Dosaev

Äkim of Turkistan Region
- In office 31 August 2022 – 6 January 2025
- Preceded by: Umirzak Shukeyev
- Succeeded by: Nuralkhan Kusherov

Ambassador of Kazakhstan to Uzbekistan
- In office 18 March 2019 – 30 August 2022
- President: Nursultan Nazarbayev; Kassym-Jomart Tokayev
- Preceded by: Erik Utembayev
- Succeeded by: Beibut Atamkulov

Senator for Shymkent
- In office 8 October 2018 – 18 March 2019 Serving with Nurlan Beknazarov
- Preceded by: Office established
- Succeeded by: Aigül Qapbarova

Äkim of Shymkent
- In office 27 May 2013 – 19 August 2015
- Preceded by: Kairat Moldaseitov
- Succeeded by: Gabidulla Abdrakhimov

Personal details
- Born: 26 March 1974 (age 52) Abai, Kazakh SSR, Soviet Union
- Party: Amanat
- Children: 4

Darhan Amangeldiūly Satybaldy (Kazakh: Дархан Амангелдіұлы Сатыбалды; born 26 March 1974) is a Kazakh politician and diplomat currently serving as the äkim of Almaty since 24 May 2025. He previously served as the First Deputy Head of the Presidential Administration of Kazakhstan.

Satybaldy has held several key government positions throughout his career. From 2022 to 2025, he served as äkim of the Turkistan Region and from 2019 to 2022, he was Kazakhstan's Ambassador to Uzbekistan, contributing to stronger bilateral ties. He also served in the Senate of the Parliament of Kazakhstan from 2018 to 2019 and as äkim of Shymkent from 2013 to 2015.

== Biography ==
=== Early life and career ===
Satybaldy was born on 26 March 1974 in the village of Abai, Saryagash District, South Kazakhstan Region. He is married and has three daughters and one son.

He graduated in 1996 from the S. Seifullin Akmola Agricultural Institute. In 2003, he received a second higher education degree from the Kazakh University of Humanities and Law in Astana.

Satybaldy began his professional career in 1991 as a worker at the Communism state farm in the Keles District. From 1996 to 1999, he served as a senior economist at the Keles State Enterprise and later as chief accountant at Kurakov & Co. in the Akmola Region.

Between 2000 and 2002, he worked as a lead controller and auditor in the Financial Control Committee under the Ministry of Finance. From 2002 to 2004, he was an assistant and consultant in the Department of Economic Analysis and Control within the Office of the President. He later became chief expert and head of the sector in the Budget Planning and Financial Control Department (2004–2006).

In 2006, Satybaldy briefly served as acting director of the state enterprise "Jylu" under the Astana City Housing Department. From 2007 to 2009, he held various roles in the Ministry of Education and Science, including deputy director of both the Budget and Finance departments, and later, deputy chairman of the Science Committee (2009–2010).

In 2010–2011, he led a department within the National Security Committee. In 2011, he was appointed deputy head of the Socio-Economic Department in the Office of the Prime Minister.

Satybaldy became äkim (mayor) of Shymkent in 2013 and was appointed First Deputy Äkim of South Kazakhstan Region in 2015. On 8 October 2018, he was elected alongside Nurlan Beknazarov to the Senate of the Parliament of Kazakhstan from Shymkent.

=== Kazakh ambassador to Uzbekistan (2019–2022) ===
On 18 March 2019, he was appointed Ambassador Extraordinary and Plenipotentiary to Uzbekistan.

On 11 January 2022, in the context of the 2022 unrest in Kazakhstan, Satybaldy in a press briefing emphasized that the unrest, which initially began as peaceful demonstrations over socio-economic grievances, was subsequently exploited by organized terrorist groups seeking to destabilize the constitutional order of the country. Satybaldy also refuted unverified reports regarding the alleged closure of the Kazakh–Uzbek border, reaffirming that border checkpoints continued to operate in normal mode throughout the crisis.

In August 2022, on the occasion of the 30th anniversary of the establishment of diplomatic relations between the two states, Satbaldy published a commemorative article titled Kazakhstan – Uzbekistan: 30 Years of Friendship, Partnership and Alliance. In it, he emphasized the shared historical and cultural ties between the two fraternal peoples, the dynamic development of bilateral cooperation across political, economic, humanitarian, and interregional dimensions, as well as the deepening of mutual trust at the highest level. Under his ambassadorship, significant attention was given to expanding trade and investment cooperation, developing industrial and transport-logistics projects, promoting intergovernmental and inter-parliamentary dialogue, and enhancing cultural and educational exchanges.

=== Äkim of Turkistan Region (2022–2025) ===
Satybaldy was appointed Äkim of Turkistan Region on 30 August 2022.

During his tenure, he focused on infrastructure development, agricultural modernization, and youth engagement. He emphasized solving regional water issues, enhancing gas supply, and promoting public-private partnerships. Satybaldy also prioritized the completion of major projects like the Turkistan International Airport and a new thermal power plant, while encouraging civic feedback through open forums.

=== First Deputy Chief of Staff of the Presidential Administration ===
Following his tenure as Äkim of Turkistan Region, Satybaldy was appointed as the First Deputy Chief of Staff of the Presidential Administration on 6 January 2025. According to a statement, this position was introduced to enhance governance processes, improve interregional coordination, and strengthen oversight of the implementation of President Kassym-Jomart Tokayev's directives at the regional level. In this role, Satybaldy was also tasked with contributing to the restoration and deepening of public trust in state institutions through effective policy execution and institutional accountability.

=== Äkim of Almaty (2025–present) ===
On 24 May 2025, Satybaldy was appointed äkim of Almaty. During the extraordinary session of the Almaty City Mäslihat of the eighth convocation, his candidacy was approved by a vote of 23 to 9. A total of 32 deputies participated in the meeting convened to confirm the appointment, with the remaining 9 votes cast for the other candidate, deputy äkim Beibut Şahanov. Prime Minister Oljas Bektenov introduced Darkhan Satybaldy as the new Äkim of Almaty, noting that President Tokayev tasked him with improving the city's economy, upgrading infrastructure, and expanding public spaces. Satybaldy was also instructed to focus on transport, the environment, industry, tourism, IT, and creative sectors.

Upon assuming office, Satybaldy outlined his priorities for the city of Almaty—including sustainable urban development, improved transport and infrastructure, environmental protection, economic diversification, support for business and social services, and a commitment to transparent, citizen-focused governance.

== Controversies ==
=== Nepotist allegations ===
During Satybaldy's tenure as äkim of the Turkistan Region, scrutiny emerged over alleged connections between his family and several companies with questionable reputations, including Fitness Palace and Nomad Stroy Company. These firms, reportedly linked to his brothers, were accused of tax noncompliance and one was involved in the controversial development of the Lake Taldykol in Astana. When questioned by journalists in 2023, Satybaldy clarified that he comes from a large family of seven siblings, most of whom are older than him and have been involved in business since the early 1990s. He emphasized that their business operations are entirely separate from his official duties, conducted primarily in Astana, and that his relatives have never interfered with his political work. He declined to comment on the specifics of the Lake Taldykol case.

=== "Khan" incident ===
In October 2022, Satybaldy faced public backlash after a protest by cotton farmers in the Turkistan Region, who gathered outside the akimat building seeking help with falling cotton prices. In a symbolic gesture, they knelt and referred to Satybaldy as a "khan", pleading for his attention and intervention. Although Satybaldy did not appear to personally meet the farmers at that moment, his press service noted that he had previously met with them in September, promising subsidies and support. However, some of the farmers were also seeking resolution to legal matters beyond the akimat's jurisdiction.

Satybaldy later recalled that he had been in a meeting with national government agencies during the protest and was unaware of the event until shown video footage afterward. The incident drew national attention and led to Satybaldy being mockingly dubbed "Khan" in the media, a label that lingered despite his prior efforts to assist the farmers.
