= Assel Janassova =

Kazakh politician (born 1987)

- Әсел Жанасова
- Official portrait

Deputy Prime Minister of Kazakhstan
- Incumbent
- Assumed office 3 November 2026
- President: Kassym-Jomart Tokayev
- Prime Minister: Oljas Bektenov

Minister of Transport
- Incumbent
- Assumed office 3 November 2026
- President: Kassym-Jomart Tokayev
- Prime Minister: Oljas Bektenov
- Preceded by: Nurlan Sauranbaev

Deputy Aqorda Chief of Staff
- In office 10 December 2025 – 3 November 2026
- President: Kassym-Jomart Tokayev

Advisor to the president
- In office 8 June 2025 – 10 December 2025
- President: Kassym-Jomart Tokayev

CEO of Kazpost
- In office 3 October 2022 – 8 June 2025

Personal details
- Born: Assel Jubanyşqyzy Jienbaeva; 8 July 1987 (age 39) Almaty, Kazakh SSR, Soviet Union
- Spouse: Kärim Janassov
- Children: 2
- Education: University of Cambridge (BCS); Moscow State University (MAS)

Assel Jubanyşqyzy Janassova (Note: Often transliterated as Asel Zhubanyshevna Zhanasova through a Russified Romanization of Асель Жубанышевна Жанасова.) (Note: Kazakh: Әсел Жұбанышқызы Жанасова) (née Jienbaeva; born 8 July 1987) is a Kazakh IT manager and politician serving as the Deputy Prime Minister and Minister of Transport since 2026. Previously, she was an advisor to the President of Kazakhstan and Deputy Aqorda Chief of Staff under Kassym-Jomart Tokayev.

== Early life, family and early career ==
Assel Jubanyşqyzy Jienbaeva was born on 8 July 1987 in Almaty, Soviet Kazakhstan.

Her father, Jubanyş Jienbaev (Note: Kazakh: Жубаныш Жиенбаев) (Note: Russian: Жұбаныш Жиенбаев) served as the chief engineer of the Kazakh Anti-Plague Research Institute. He was the brother of the prominent writer and journalist Quanyş Jienbai (born 1952). On 18 May 2004, Jubanyş Jienbaev sustained severe injuries in a plane crash during a flight to Vozrozhdeniya Island in the Aral Sea and died from his injuries in an Almaty hospital on 7 June 2004.

Her mother, Saira Nağaşybaiqyzy Jienbaeva (Note: Kazakh: Сайра Нағашыбайқызы Жиенбаева) (Note: Russian: Сайра Нагашыбаевна Жиенбаева) (born 27 November 1962, in the Shalkar, Aktobe Region) is a scholar, docent, and Doctor of Pedagogical Sciences. She holds a professorship and served as the Dean of the Faculty of Psychology and Pedagogy at the Kazakh National Women's Teacher Training University from 2012 to 2020. In 2017, she drew public attention and controversy following criticism directed at Baian Maqsatqyzy and Nurtas Adambay, whom she publicly characterized as poor role models for the nation due to their divorces.

In 2005, Assel Janassova graduated from the Republican Physics and Mathematics School with a medal. Under the Bolashak programme, she completed a pre-university course at the University of Cambridge and subsequently pursued her higher education there. In 2010, she graduated with honors from the University of Cambridge, earning a BCS. To fulfill the mandatory five-year employment obligation in Kazakhstan required of Bolashak graduates, Janassova sought career opportunities within domestic corporations. She joined the London office of the Kazakh mining company Eurasian Resources Group (ERG) under a newly appointed director. Initially hired as an assistant to the director, she oversaw cybersecurity operations for the company's offices across seven countries. She was subsequently promoted to IT Specialist, then IT Management Manager, and eventually became the Director of the IT Security Department at ERG.

In 2014, she earned a master's degree from Moscow State University. That same year, she returned to Kazakhstan after her husband, Kärim Janassov, received a professional invitation to work in the country. She joined the National Bank of Kazakhstan, initially serving as an advisor to the director of the Banking Service Bureau before being appointed Deputy Director of the Digital Technologies Department.

== Later career ==
Following a change in the National Bank's leadership in late 2015, Janassova was appointed CEO of Zerde Holding on 6 April 2016, serving in this role until 2017, when she became an advisor to the CEO of the Astana International Financial Centre (AIFC) of Kairat Kelimbetov. In 2018, she was appointed Chief Digital Officer of the AIFC.

== Political career ==
On 20 July 2020, PM Asqar Mamin appointed Janassova as Vice Minister of Trade and Integration. She was removed from the post on 30 September 2022.

Four days later, on 3 October 2022 by a decision of the Samruq-Qazyna Fund, she was appointed CEO of the national postal service, Kazpost. Under her leadership, Kazpost reversed years of multi-billion losses and recorded a net profit of 2.4 billion tenge for the first time in five years. By establishing direct contracts with major Chinese e-commerce marketplaces, the company reduced package delivery times to Kazakhstan from 45 days down to 10–14 days. Operational optimization allowed for a 25% salary increase for 20,000 production employees. Janassova also oversaw the integration of artificial intelligence into the company's operations, contributing to a 35% growth in total parcel volume. These structural reforms enabled Kazpost to enter the top 50 global postal services and secure a stable investment-grade "BBB-" rating from Fitch Ratings.

On 8 June 2025, president Kassym-Jomart Tokayev appointed Janassova as his advisor. On 10 December of the same year, she was named Deputy Aqorda Chief of Staff, where she oversaw the transport and logistics sectors.

On 3 November 2026, Janassova's candidacy for Deputy Prime Minister and Minister of Transport was approved by the Kurultai and confirmed by Tokayev's decree, after which she joined the second Bektenov Government.

== Personal life ==
She is married to Kärim Ğabithanūly Janassov (Note: Kazakh: Карим Габитханович Жанасов) (Note: Russian: Кәрім Ғабитханұлы Жанасов) (born 3 November 1981). A graduate of the Russian State Geological Prospecting University and the University of Oxford, he has served as the Chairman of the Board of Directors of Tau-Ken Samruq (Samruk-Kazyna subsidiary) since 2021. They has two sons, Ibragim (born 2019) and Alim (born 2022). Also she speaks Russian and English in addition to his native Kazakh.

== Awards ==
- Medal "30 Years of the Independence of Kazakhstan"
