= Beibut Atamkulov =

Kazakh politician and diplomat

- Бейбіт Атамқұлов
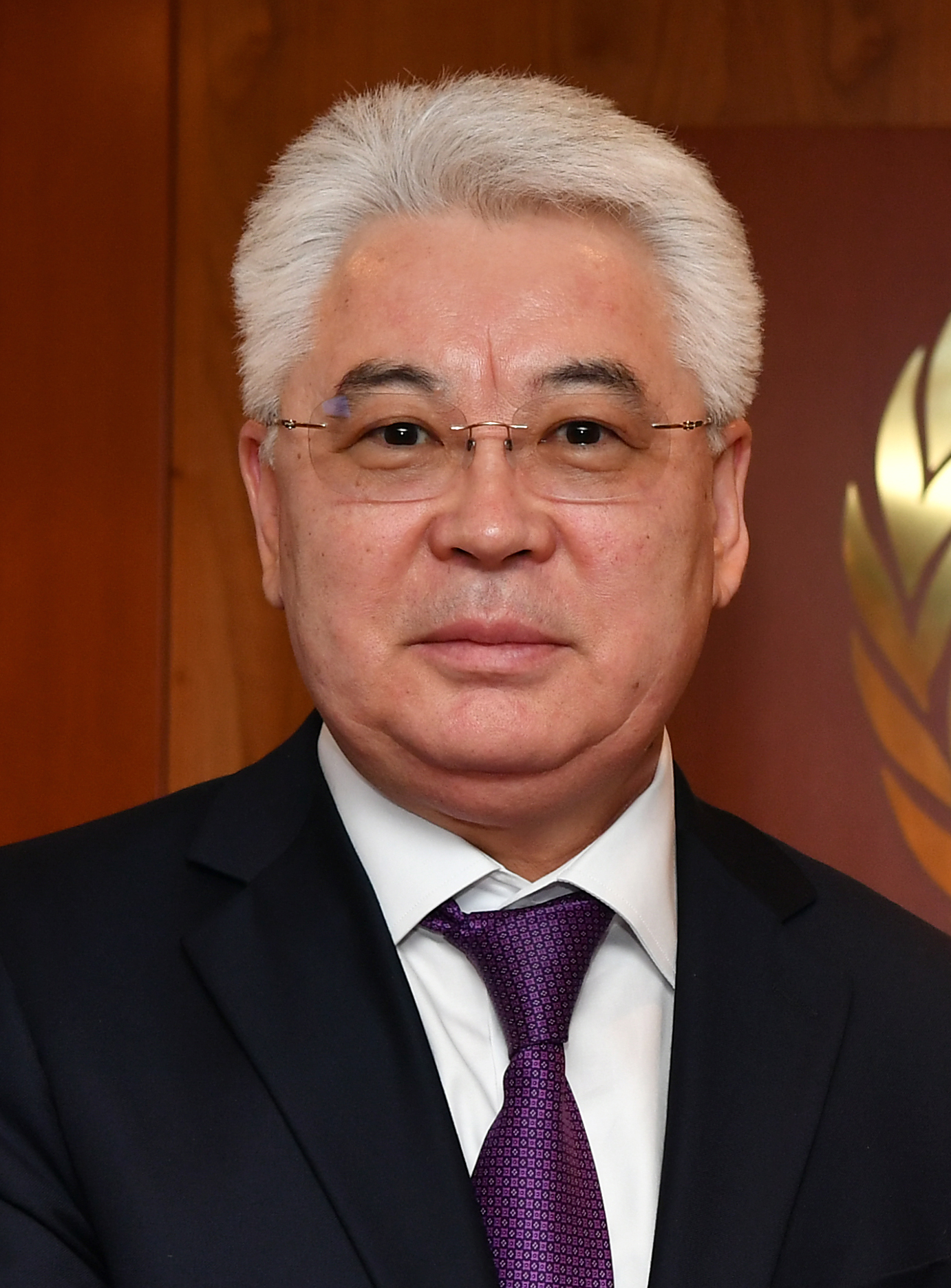
- Atamkulov in 2019

Kazakh ambassador to Uzbekistan
- In office 31 October 2022 – 22 July 2026
- President: Kassym-Jomart Tokayev
- Preceded by: Darhan Satybaldy
- Succeeded by: Eraly Togjanov

Minister of Industry and Infrastructure Development
- In office 18 September 2019 – 11 January 2022
- President: Kassym-Jomart Tokayev
- Prime Minister: Askar Mamin
- Preceded by: Roman Sklyar
- Succeeded by: Qaiyrbek Öskenbaev

Minister of Foreign Affairs
- In office 26 December 2018 – 18 September 2019
- President: Nursultan Nazarbayev; Kassym-Jomart Tokayev
- Prime Minister: Bakhytzhan Sagintayev; Askar Mamin
- Preceded by: Kairat Abdrakhmanov
- Succeeded by: Mukhtar Tleuberdi

Minister of Defense and Aerospace Industry
- In office 7 October 2016 – 26 December 2018
- President: Nursultan Nazarbayev
- Prime Minister: Bakhytzhan Sagintayev
- Preceded by: Office established
- Succeeded by: Askar Zhumagaliyev

Äkim of South Kazakhstan Region
- In office 8 August 2015 – 7 October 2016
- President: Nursultan Nazarbayev
- Preceded by: Askar Myrzakhmetov
- Succeeded by: Zhanseit Tuymenbayev

Personal details
- Born: 19 May 1964 (age 62) Uzynagash, Kazakh SSR, Soviet Union
- Spouse: Bağila Saparbaeva
- Children: 3
- Education: Satbayev University; Saint Petersburg State University of Economics and Finance

Beibut Atamkulov (Kazakh: Бейбіт Бәкірұлы Атамқұлов, Beibıt Bäkırūly Atamqūlov; born 19 May 1964) is a Kazakh politician and diplomat served as ambassador to Uzbekistan from 2022 to 2026. Previously, he served as Minister of Industry and Infrastructure Development from 2019 to 2022 and as Minister of Foreign Affairs from 2018 to 2019. Atamkulov has an economic and financial background.

== Early life and education ==
In 1986, Beibut Atamkulov graduated from the Satbayev University with a degree in Metallurgical Engineering. In 2000, he graduated from St. Petersburg State University of Economics and Finance, and holds the degree of Candidate of Economic Sciences.

From 1986 to 1991, he worked as a smelter, a shift foreman, a senior foreman, an engineer, and a deputy head of the department at the Chimkent Lead Plant.

== Career ==
Atamkulov has extensive career in international relations. From 2006 to 2007, he served as Counsellor and later Minister-Counselor of the Embassy of Kazakhstan in Russia (Moscow). In 2007–08, he served as Minister-Counsellor of the Embassy of the Kazakhstan in Iran (Tehran). In 2008–10, he served as Consul General of Kazakhstan in Frankfurt am Main in Germany. From 2010 to 2012, Atamkulov served as Ambassador Extraordinary and Plenipotentiary of Kazakhstan to Malaysia with concurrent accreditation to the Philippines, Indonesia and Brunei.

On 8 August 2015, he was appointed an akim of South Kazakhstan Region. He served in that position until he became the Minister of Defense and Aerospace Industry on 7 October 2016.

On 26 December 2018, Atamkulov was appointed as the Minister of Foreign Affairs. He conducted his first visit to the United States as Foreign Minister under President Kassym-Jomart Tokayev on 1–2 July 2019. On the second day of the visit, he met with U.S. Secretary of State Mike Pompeo. The Secretary expressed strong support for strengthening bilateral relations and working with the newly elected Kazakh President.

Atamkulov participated in the 15th EU-Central Asia Ministerial Meeting in Kyrgyz capital Bishkek on 7 July 2019. The Conference was dedicated to the launch of the new EU strategy on Central Asia. On the sidelines of the event, Atamkulov presented the Order of Dostyk (Friendship) of the 1st degree to EU's High Representative for foreign policy Federica Mogherini on behalf of President Tokayev.

Atamkulov was released from the position of Foreign Minister and appointed as Minister of Industry and Infrastructure Development of Kazakhstan in September 2019.

On October 31, 2022, was appointed Ambassador Extraordinary and Plenipotentiary of the Republic of Kazakhstan to Republic of Uzbekistan. On July 22, 2026 Beibit Atamkulov relieved of post.

== See also ==
Ministry of Foreign Affairs (Kazakhstan)
