= Deputy Chairman of the Kurultai =

Vice speaker of Kazakhstan's parliament

- Құрылтай төрағасының орынбасары (Kazakh); заместитель председателя Курултая (Russian)
- Emblem of Kazakhstan
- Incumbent; Nurlan Beknazarov; Dania Espaeva; Dinara Zakieva since 28 August 2026
- Nominator: Chairman of the Kurultai
- Appointer: Kurultai members
- Term length: 5 years
- Precursor: Deputy Chair of the Senate; Deputy Chair of the Mäjilis
- Formation: 1 July 2026
- First holder: Nurlan Beknazarov

The deputy chairman of the Kurultai of the Republic of Kazakhstan (Note: Kazakh: Қазақстан Республикасы Құрылтайы төрағасының орынбасары; Qazaqstan Respublikasy Qūryltaiy törağasynyñ orynbasary; IPA: [qɑzɑɣ(ɯ)sˈtʰɑn rʲɪˈspublʲɪkäˈsɯ qo̙rɯɫtʰɑˈjɯ tʰøræ.ɣɑsɯˈnɯŋ (w)ɔrɯnbɑsɑˈrɯ]; Russian: Заместитель председателя Курултая Республики Казахстан; Zamestitel predsedatelya Kurultaya Respubliki Kazakhstan; IPA: [zəmʲɪˈsʲtʲitʲɪlʲ prʲɪt͡sʲsʲɪˈdatʲɪlʲə kʊrʊɫˈtajə rʲɪˈspublʲɪkʲɪ kɐzɐxˈstan]]) is the deputy speaker of Kazakhstan's unicameral legislature, the Kurultai. In the Kurultai, there are three Deputy Chairs.

== History ==
After Kazakhstan gained independence in 1991, the country adopted a new constitutional framework in 1995, establishing the bicameral Parliament of Kazakhstan consisting of the Senate and the Mäjilis. Each chamber was headed by a chairman of the Senate and Mäjilis and assisted by deputy chairs of the Senate and Mäjilis. This system functioned as the national legislature until its dissolution in 2026, when a new Constitution came into force following a nationwide referendum.

The first election of the Kurultai has taken place on 23 August 2026. The Kurultai is scheduled to convene and elect its first chair and deputy chair. The office of deputy chair of the Kurultai succeeds the positions of deputy chair of the Senate and deputy chair of the Mäjilis.

== Duties ==
The Kurultai's deputy chairs ensure continuity by substituting for the Chairman of the Kurultai during temporary absences, illness, or incapacity, and by carrying out individual functions and assignments formally delegated by the chairman.

== Appointment ==
=== Election ===
The deputy chairmen are elected by the Kurultai's members upon the recommendation and nomination of the Chairman of the Kurultai.

=== Removal ===
Their tenure as deputy chairman ends if they lose their mandate as a MP, resign, or are otherwise removed through standard parliamentary procedures governing the leadership of the Kurultai.

== List of Deputy Chairmen ==
Convocation	Name	Took office	Left office	Tenure	Chairman
1st (2026– present)	Nurlan Beknazarov	28 August 2026	Incumbent	1 month and 25 days	Aibek Dädebai
1st (2026– present)	Dania Espaeva	28 August 2026	Incumbent	1 month and 25 days	Aibek Dädebai
1st (2026– present)	Dinara Zakieva	28 August 2026	Incumbent	1 month and 25 days	Aibek Dädebai
