= Mukhtar Auezov =

Kazakh writer, academic, and social activist (1897-1961)

- Мұхтар Омарханұлы Әуезов
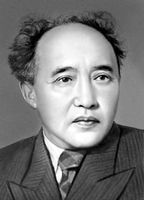
- Born: 16 September [O.S. 28 September] 1897; Chinghistau, Semipalatinsk Oblast, Russian Empire (now in Abay District, Kazakhstan)
- Died: 27 June 1961 (aged 63); Moscow, Soviet Union
- Occupations: Poet; dramaturgist; scientist
- Writing career
- Language: Kazakh
- Genre: Novel
- Notable awards: Lenin Prize; Stalin Prize; Order of Lenin; Order of the Red Banner of Labour (2); Order of the Badge of Honour; Medal "For Valiant Labour in the Great Patriotic War 1941–1945"
- Movement: Socialist realism

Mukhtar Omarkhanuli Auezov (Kazakh: Мұхтар Омарханұлы Әуезов, romanized: Mūhtar Omarhanūly Äuezov, مۇحتار ومارحانۇلى اۋەزوۆ, [mo̙χtɑɾ ɔmɑɾˈχɑno̙lɯ æwˈjezəf]; 28 September 1897 – 27 June 1961) was a Kazakh writer, a social activist, a Doctor of Philology, and an honored academician of the Soviet Union (1946).

Auezov's writings were influenced by the Kazakh poet Abai Qunanbaiuly. Auezov's father Omarkhan and grandfather Auez both highly revered the poet, who was a neighbour and a friend of the Auezov family. His grandfather was a storyteller of folk tales, and taught his grandson to read and write.

== Biography ==
Auezov was born in a nomadic Muslim family from an area known today as Abay District, in East Kazakhstan Province. His grandfather taught him how to read and write, using both the Arabic and Cyrillic script for the Kazakh language. Auezov was educated at the Semipalatinsk Teacher's Seminary and Leningrad State University.

Auezov is best known for the plays he wrote. The first play he authored was Enlik-Kebek, a story of two young lovers that resembles the story of Romeo and Juliet. He authored more than twenty plays that dealt with the issues relevant to socialism in Kazakhstan.

After writing plays, Auezov changed his focus to writing novels. Two novels – Abay and The Path of Abay – dealing with the life of Kazakh poet Abai Qunanbaiuly were the product of the last twenty years of his life.

Auezov's other projects included drawing and translating literature into the Kazakh language. Some translations made by him include Nikolai Gogol's The Government Inspector and Shakespeare's The Taming of the Shrew.

Auezov first studied in Kaskabulak, then later a Muslim madrasa in Semipalatinsk. At age of eleven, he moved to a nearby, five-year grammar school. His father Omarkhan died in 1900, and his mother Nurzhamal in 1912. The young Auezov was raised by his uncle Kasymbek and his grandfather Auez and grandmother Dinas. In 1907, after a year of study in the madrasa, he was sent to the large Russian school in Semipalatinsk.

Mukhtar Auezov attended the Semipalatinsk Pedagogical Seminary after graduating from the City College. In the 1912–1913 academic year, Auezov finished the first seminary class with an award and went on to complete his studies at the Semipalatinsk Seminary in 1919. Around this time he began his acquaintance with Russian and other foreign classics of literature. At the same time, Auezov wrote short stories, poems and articles that began to be published.

"The young Auezov, according to the testimonies of the pedagogues, was marked for his impeccable attention, extraordinary gifts, slim build and aristocratic self-belief. He was an extraordinary sportsman and represented "Yarysh F C", which at the time was the best football team in the city."

Auezov joined the faculty of a large state school, and he also worked holding various positions in the local government in Semipalatinsk with the Kazakh Central Executive Committee and in Orenburg.

In the summer of 1917, Auezov married a 15-year-old girl named Raihan. They had a daughter together in 1918 who they named Mugamilya (she lived until 2009), and a year later, in 1919, a son (who died in infancy). They got divorced in 1920.

In 1928 Mukhtar Auezov graduated from the Philological Faculty of Leningrad State University and completed his PhD at the University of Tashkent. During the 1930s, his endeavors as a professional writer began to take off. Mukhtar Auezov died during an operation in Moscow on 27 June 1961. He was buried in the Central Cemetery, Almaty. On his grave there stands a bust created by Yevgeny Vuchetich.

After his death in 1961, the Government of the Republic Kazakhstan decided to perpetuate the name of the writer. The Institute of Literature and Art of the Academy of Sciences was renamed as the Auezov Institute of Literature and Art of the Academy of Sciences. The Kazakh State Academic Drama Theatre, the Auezov Home Museum, a school, a street and an urban area in Almaty also bear his name. Also the M. O. Auezov South Kazakhstan State University in Shymkent was named after him.

On 21 July 2022, President of Kazakhstan Kassym-Jomart Tokayev unveiled a bust of Mukhtar Auezov in Kyrgyzstan.

A selection of his stories were translated by Simon Hollingsworth and Simon Geoghegan and collected in Beauty in Mourning and Other Stories, published by Qazaq Pen Club.

== Writings ==
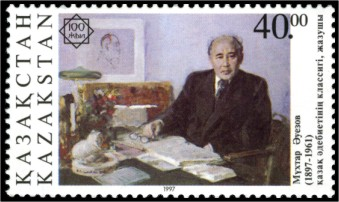
1997 Kazakh stamp dedicated to Auezov

Auezov wrote numerous essays, short stories, and plays (many translated into other languages) in different genres.

In 1917, while he was studying at the seminary, he wrote "Enilik-Kebek" (a play based on folk legends). The "Enilik-Kebek" play and the story "Korgansyzdyn Kuni", which was written in 1921 demonstrated to the world his great talent as a writer. From 1923 he began to devote all his energy to the literary arts and to work productively. In the period 1923–1926 he authored stories such as "Okygan azamat", "Kyr suretteri", "Uilenu", "Eskilik kolenkesinde", "Kinamshil boizhetken", "Karaly sulu".

During the period 1923–1928 years he studied and then graduated from Leningrad University in the Faculty of Language and Literature. During the last two years of his studies in Leningrad, he wrote two highly acclaimed novels: "Karash-karash" and "Kokserek".

Auezov began working in depth with themes of Kazakh history. His fixation with history is demonstrated in his works "Enilik-Kebek", "Khan Kene", "Kily zmaan", "Aiman – Sholpan", and "Karakypshak Kobylandy." For 20 years he devoted himself to prose and plays, which have become classics of Kazakh literature. In the thirties, he wrote a series of stories, such as: "Kasennin kubylystary", "Izder", "Shatkalan", "Kum men Askar", "Burtkiwi", and plays like "Aiman-Sholpan", "Tas tilek", "Shekarada", "Tungi saryn".

In 1936 he published a piece of prose called "Tatiananyn kyrdagy ani" in the Kazakh press "Kazak adebieti", that was a section from the future novel of the same name. Some years after that(around 1940), with the cooperation of Leonid Sobolev, he wrote the "Abai" tragedy. The great scientist and teacher, Auezov, worked on the history of Kazakhs literature, and the training of personnel. He was the founder of the Abai studies and the principal author and editor of the multivolume "Kazak adebiet Tarihy". He also wrote a monograph on the Kyrgyz epic Manas.

After the Abai Joly epic, he began writing a new, large-scale epic that described a new era in the future. His first book of that period is called "Osken orken" and was first published posthumously in 1962. A period of blooming of Kazakh drama is associated with the works of Auezov. He wrote over twenty plays and translated such classic works of world and Russian drama as The Inspector by Gogol, Othello and The Taming of the Shrew by Shakespeare, Aristocrats by Nikolai Pogodin, Spring Love by Konstantin Trenyov, and Officer of the Navy by A. Kron.

He visited India for the first time in 1955 and wrote Indian Essays (Индия очерктері). In 1960, together with a group of Soviet writers, he visited the United States. In the summer of 1960, he started work on the series of essays named "The American Impressions". From mid-summer 1960, he began work on the novel named "The Young Tribe". In March 1961, Auezov embarked on a visit to India that included participation in the work of the III International Congress for Peace in Delhi together with a delegation headed by Nikolai Tikhonov. In June of that same year, he planned to visit England, the land of Shakespeare, but his untimely death meant that his wish to travel to England did not occur. On 3 June 1961, he traveled to Moscow for medical tests. On 27 June 1961 – his heart failed during a surgical operation.

== Abai Joly ==
In his formative years, Auezov listened to the memories of his grandfather that told of Abai and Kunanbay. The destiny of Mukhtar Auezov was linked by many threads to the life of Abai the hero great inspiration of his life. Abai himself graced family celebrations, arranged for Auez to mark the birth of his grandson. Nurganym, one of the wives of Kunanbai father of Abai, was the sister of Auez.

Auezov later became friends with the son of Abai Turagulom and married Camille, granddaughter of the great poet, that is the daughter of Magauov. Auezov met Dilda, the first wife of Abai with whom he received a great deal of information. More information about Abai was forthcoming from Eigerim another of Abai's life partners who survived her husband for more than a decade.

Auezov for 15 years wrote his famous four-volume epic historical novel called "Abai Joly" ("The Path of Abai"). It was translated into Russian. In 1949 two books of the novel "Abai" received the first level award of the Union of Soviet Socialist Republics. This epic, which ended with four books, was awarded the Lenin Prize. was translated into 30 languages, and received rave reviews from readers all over the world.

"Abai Joly" is one of the most popular and valuable novels written by Mukhtar Auezov. The first book of the series was published in 1942 and after five years in 1947 "Abai", the second of the series was published, then came the third book in 1952 called "Abai aga" (Brother Abai). Finally, the fourth book was released in 1956. Later all of the books were repackaged and renamed as "Abai zholy" (The Path of Abai). The first book and second books each have 7 chapters and one epilogue. The third book has 6 chapters as has the Fourth and one epilogue entire epic is divided into 20 short chapters each of which includes uniquely interesting situations.

Each chapter's name precisely demonstrates the psychological state of the events within the story. If we compare there is much more drama, tragedy, sadness and sorrow than positive and happy moments. In the first book we can clearly see how the young and inexperienced boy grows up and at the end of the fourth book we see how he became an adult and changed and who ultimately fails.

Mukhtar Auezov wrote the libretto of the opera Abai.

== Filmography ==
- "Raihan" – 1940, Film of 8 parts. Studio, "Thumbnail". Screenplay: M. Auezov; Director: M.Levin.; Operator: H.Nazaryants Cast: E.Omirzakov, D.Bokeeva, S.Kozhamkulov.
- "Abai әnderі" – 1945. Film in 10 parts. Studio "Kazakhfilm". Screenplay: M.Auezov, G. Roshal.; Director: G.Roshal; Operator: G.Pyshkova; Artist: K.Hodzhikov; Cast: K.Kuanyshpaev, K.Badyrov, Sh.Aymanov, S.Kozhamkulov.
- "Shyndagy Shynar" – 1966. Film in 10 parts. Studio "Kazakhfilm". Screenplay: K.Muhamedzhanov; Director: S.Hodzhikov; Operator: A.Ashrapov; Cast: S.Panov, G.Adilova, N.Zhanturin, Y.Nogaybaev.
- "Caras-Caras" – 1969. Studio "Kazakhfilm" zhane "Kyrғyzfilm". Screenplay: Akim Tarazi; Director: B.Shamshiev; Cast: S.Chokmorov, S.Zhumadylov, M.Ryskulov, B.Kydykeeva
- "Kokserek" – 1973. Studio "Kazakhfilm". Screenplay: A.Mihalkov-Konchalovsky, E.Tropinin; Director: T.Okeev; Operator: K.Kydyraliev;Cast: S.Chokmorov, K.Ualiev, K. Sataev
- "Caral sulu" – 1982.Studio "Kazakhfilm". Writer, director: E.Shynarbaev; Cast: N.Arynbasarova, N.Zhanturin
- "Abai" 1995. Studio "Kazakhfilm". Screenplay: A.Amirkulov, L.Ahynzhanova, A.Baranov, S.Aprymov; Director: A.Amirkulov.; Operator: A. Suleev. Composer: Kuat Shildebaev; Cast: G.Turykbaev, T.Zhamankulov, B.Rimova, F.Zhantileuova

== Studies of his writings ==
In Russian and Kazakh, here have been a number of books and articles about his writings. There are now works written in English, also.

- Abdurakhmanova, A. "SCIENTIFIC WRITER-MUKHTAR AUEZOV." Science and Innovation 1, no. 3 (2022): 772-774.
- Alina, A. D. "“National idea” in the short stories of Mukhtar Auezov and Kim Dong-in: cognitive perception and narrative analysis." Вестник КазНУ. Серия Востоковедения 90, no. 3 (2019).
- DILNOZA, KHILKEYEVA. "SOCIAL THEMES IN THE PROSE OF MUKHTAR AUEZOV. Proceedings of the 1st International Scientific Conference «Research Retrieval and Academic Letters»(January 26–27, 2023). Warsaw, Poland, 2023. 317p, p. 184-187. University of Warmia and Mazury in Olsztyn, 2023.
- Kenzhebekova, Gulnaz, Baktiyar Smanov, Nurgul Tutinova, Orhan Soylemez, and Gulzhan Tulekova. "Religious Worldview in the Works of Auezov." The International Journal of Literary Humanities 22, no. 1 (2023): 35ff
- Mashakova, A. "CREATIVITY OF MUKHTAR AUEZOV IN CHINESE LITERARY STUDIES." Annali d’Italia 23 (2021): 30-31.
- Mashakova, A. "RECEPTION OF MUKHTAR AUEZOV'S CREATIVITY IN EASTERN EUROPEAN COUNTRIES." Sciences of Europe 88-2 (2022): 56-58.
- Mashakova, A. "RESEARCH WORKS ON MUKHTAR AUEZOV'S CREATIVITY IN TURKEY." The Scientific Heritage 74-3 (2021): 41-44.
- Mashakova, A. K. "PERCEPTION OF LITERARY HERITAGE OF MUKHTAR AUEZOV IN GERMANY." Deutsche Internationale Zeitschrift für zeitgenössische Wissenschaft 16 (2021): 46-48.
- McGuire, Gabriel. "Aqyn agha? Abai Zholy as socialist realism and as literary history." Journal of Eurasian Studies 9, no. 1 (2018): 2-11.
- Nurgali, Kadisha R., Shynar B. Suleimenova, and Yuliya V. Bogdanova. "Conflict and ways of individualising mass images in early Kazakh prose." Journal of Language and Linguistic Studies 17, no. 3 (2021): 1277-1289.
- Omarova, A., A. Kaztuganova, A. Sultanova, S. Tatkenova, and Z. Kdyrniyazova. "MO Auezov and musical art of Kazakhstan in the coordinates of the global world." Rupkatha Journal on Interdisciplinary Studies in Humanities 12, no. 5 (2020): 1-14.
- Pirali, Gulzia and Aizhan Kurmanbayeva. 2023. “Story of the Use and Study of Kazakh Proverbs in the Soviet Period: The Use of Proverbs in the Works of the Writer M. Auezov.” In Contemporary Kazakh Proverb Research, ed. by Gulnara Omarbekova and Erik Aasland, pp. 75-8

== Awards ==
- 1945 – Medal "For Valiant Labour in the Great Patriotic War 1941–1945"
- 1948 - [[Medal "In Commemoration of the 800th Anniversary of Moscow"]]
- 1949 – Order of the Badge of Honour
- 1955, 1959 – deputy of the Supreme Soviet of the Kazakh SSR
- 1957 – The title "The Honored Figure of Science of the Kazakh SSR"
- 1959 – The Lenin Prize for the novel-dialogue The Way of Abai.

== Diplomas and certificates ==
- 1946 – The Diploma of Doctor of Science (the scientific degree of doctor of science (philology)
- 1946 – The Certificate of Professor (Professor at the Chair of "Kazakh literature")
- 1946 – The Member of the Academy of Sciences of the Kazakh SSR.
- 1953 – The Certificate of Professor of the Moscow State University after M.V.Lomonosov.
