= Ministry of Transport (Kazakhstan) =

Ministry of Kazakhstan

Ministry of Transport of the Republic of Kazakhstan
- Қазақстан Республикасының Көлік министрлігі (Kazakh); Министерство транспорта Республики Казахстан (Russian)
- Emblem of Kazakhstan

Agency overview
- Formed: 1991; 1 September 2023 (re-established)
- Jurisdiction: Government of Kazakhstan
- Headquarters: 32/1 Kabanbay Batyr Avenue, Astana 010000, Kazakhstan; 51°7′53″N 71°24′59″E
- Minister responsible: Assel Janassova, Minister of Transport
- Website: www.gov.kz/memleket/entities/transport

The Ministry of Transport of the Republic of Kazakhstan (MT RK; Kazakh: Қазақстан Республикасының Көлік министрлігі, ҚР КМ; Russian: Министерство транспорта Республики Казахстан, МТ РК) is a ministry under the Government of Kazakhstan responsible for managing the areas of rail, road, and inland water transport; merchant shipping; in the field of the use of the airspace of the Republic of Kazakhstan and the activities of civil and experimental aviation; natural monopolies in the field of air navigation and airport services; socially significant markets in the field of airport services; and roads.

On 1 September 2023, by a decree of President Kassym-Jomart Tokayev, the Ministry of Industry and Infrastructure Development was reorganized by being split, which resulted in the re-establishment of the Ministry of Transport.

== History ==
The institutional roots of the Kazakh transport ministry date back to the early independence period. On 25 February 1991, Nygmetjan Esengarin became the first person to hold the post of Minister of Transport in Kazakhstan following the establishment of the office.

On 13 June 1994, the transport ministry was reorganized: the existing transport body was merged with the communications sector to form the Ministry of Transport and Communications of the Republic of Kazakhstan. That structure lasted until 6 August 2014, when the ministry was abolished in a government reform and its functions were transferred to the Ministry for Investment and Development.

On 1 September 2023, as part of a broader reorganization aimed at improving public administration, Presidential Decree No. 318 "On measures to further improve the public administration system of the Republic of Kazakhstan" signed by Kassym-Jomart Tokayev split the former Ministry of Industry and Infrastructure Development, reestablishing the Ministry of Transport to oversee Kazakhstan's transport and infrastructure policy. On 2 September 2023, Marat Qarabaev was appointed as the minister of the reestablished Ministry of Transport.

== Structure ==
The Ministry is composed of the following departments:

- Committee for Railway and Water Transport
- Committee for Road Transport and Transport Control
- Civil Aviation Committee
- Road Committee
- Department for the Investigation of Accidents and Incidents in Transport
- Department of Transport Policy
- Finance and Corporate Governance Department
- Department of Strategic Planning and Project Management
- Department of Digitalization and Public Services
- Department of International Cooperation
- Department of Administrative Work
- Legal Department
- HR Department
- Document Management Department

== List of ministers ==
- Nygmetjan Esengarin (25 February 1991 – 13 June 1994)
- vacant; ministry defunct (1994–2023)
- Marat Qarabayev (2 September 2023 – 8 June 2025)
- vacant from 8 June to 30 June 2025
- Nurlan Sauranbaev (30 June 2025 – 3 November 2026)
- Assel Janassova (since 3 November 2026)

== See also ==
- Transport in Kazakhstan
- Rail transport in Kazakhstan
- Ministry of Transport and Communications (Kazakhstan)
- Ministry of Industry and Infrastructure Development
- Government of Kazakhstan
