= Äkim of Shymkent =

Akim of Shymkent
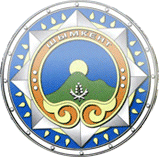
- Flag of City of Shymkent

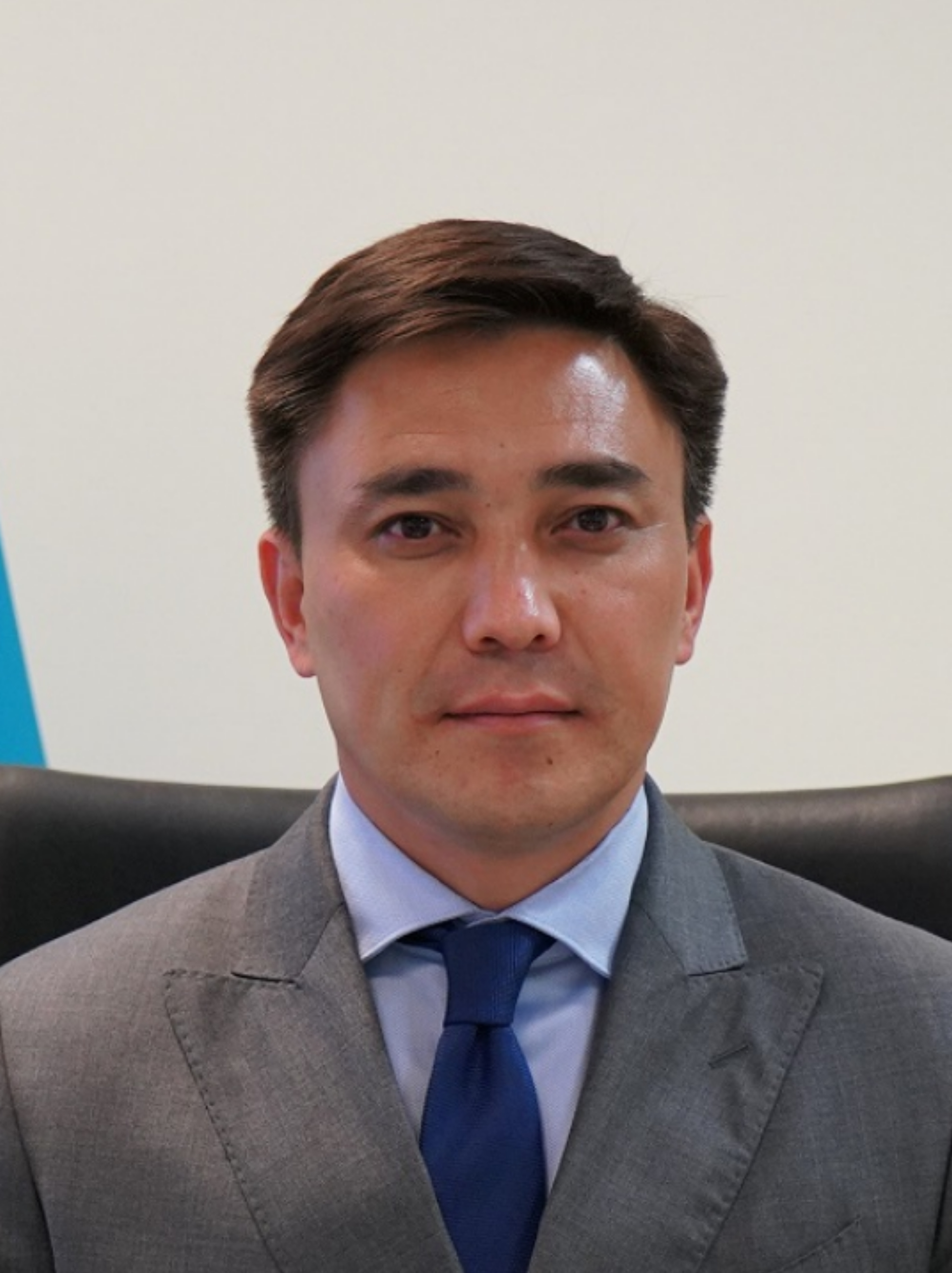
- Incumbent; Gabit Syzdykbekov since 5 September 2023
- Appointer: President
- Inaugural holder: Amalbek Tşanov
- Formation: 21 February 1992

The mayor of Şymkent (Kazakh: әкім, äkım) is the chief authority in the city of Şymkent, Kazakhstan. The position was established in 1992.

== List ==
=== Äkıms of Şymkent (1992–present) ===
Name	Term of office	
Name	Took office	Left office
Amalbek Tşanov	21 February 1992	15 December 1993
Seiıt Belgıbaev	15 December 1993	16 October 1995
Anarbek Orman	16 October 1995	14 December 1997
Qylyşbek Izbashanov	14 December 1997	14 May 1999
Töretai Bekjıgıtov	14 May 1999	17 January 2001
Bolat Jylqyşiev	15 March 2001	August 2002
Ğalymjan Jūmjaev	10 September 2002	17 February 2006
Anarbek Orman	27 September 2006	19 February 2008
Arman Jetpısbaev	19 February 2008	24 April 2012
Qairat Moldaseiıtov	24 April 2012	27 May 2013
Darhan Satybaldy	27 May 2013	19 August 2015
Ğabidolla Äbdırahimov	19 August 2015	31 October 2017
Nūrlan Sauranbaev	31 October 2017	20 June 2018
Ğabidolla Äbdırahimov	20 June 2018	21 January 2020
Murat Aitenov	21 January 2020	5 September 2023
Gabit Syzdykbekov	5 September 2023	Incumbent

== See also ==
- Akim
