= Janseiıt Tüimebaev =

Kazakh politician (born 1958)

- Жансейіт Түймебаев
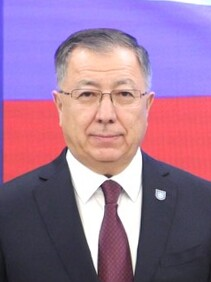
- Tüimebaev in 2024

Minister of Education and Science
- In office 10 January 2007 – 22 September 2010
- President: Nursultan Nazarbayev
- Prime Minister: Karim Massimov
- Preceded by: Byrganym Aitimova
- Succeeded by: Bakhytzhan Zhumagulov

Äkim of Turkistan Region
- In office 7 October 2016 – 26 February 2019
- Preceded by: Beibut Atamkulov
- Succeeded by: Umirzak Shukeyev

Personal details
- Born: 8 July 1958 (age 68) Qainar, Kazakh SSR, Soviet Union
- Party: Nur Otan (2007–present)
- Spouse: Janat Ensibaeva
- Children: 2
- Education: Al-Farabi Kazakh National University; Russian State Social University
- Occupation: Rector of Al-Farabi Kazakh National University
- Profession: Politician, professor, ambassador

Janseiıt Qanseiıtūly Tüimebaev (Kazakh: Жансейіт Қансейітұлы Түймебаев; born 8 July 1958) is a Kazakh politician who served as deputy chairman of the Assembly of People of Kazakhstan from 28 February 2019 to 5 February 2021. Prior to that, he was the Äkim of Turkistan Region from 2016 to 2019 and a Kazakh ambassador to Albania and Turkey from 2010 after being relieved from the post as Minister of Education and Science, to which he served since replacing Byrganym Aytimova on 10 January 2007 after a political shakeup.

Tüimebaev is currently the rector of Al-Farabi Kazakh National University since February 2021.

== Biography ==
=== Early life and career ===
Born in 1958 in the village of Qainar, Tüimebaev graduated from the Al-Farabi Kazakh National University in 1980 with a degree in philology. In 2000, he specialized in law after studying at the Russian State Social University in Moscow.

From 1980 to 1993, Tüimebaev worked as an assistant, senior lecturer, and as associate professor of the Al-Farabi Kazakh National University. In 1993, he was appointed as first secretary, head of the Department of Management of the Middle and Middle East and Africa of the Ministry of Foreign Affairs and from 1994, Tüimebaev served as second then first secretary of the Kazakh Embassy in Turkey before his appointment as a consultant of the Protocol Service of the President of Kazakhstan while working as consul general of Kazakhstan in Istanbul. In 1999, Tüimebaev became the Chief of Protocol of the President of Kazakhstan and from March 2004, he served as an advisor to President Nursultan Nazarbayev.

=== Political and diplomatic career ===
In February 2006, Tüimebaev was appointed as a Kazakh Ambassador to Russia where he worked in the post for almost year before becoming the Minister of Education and Science on 10 January 2007. Tüimebaev served as an Education and Science Minister until being eventually dismissed on 22 September 2010 and replaced by Bakhytzhan Zhumagulov. Following his dismissal, Tüimebaev was appointed as the Kazakh Ambassador to Turkey on 7 October 2010, and from 3 March 2011, he became the ambassador to Albania concurrently.

On 7 October 2016, by the Decree of the President, Tüimebaev was appointed as the Äkim of South Kazakhstan Region. Following the renaming of the region to which Tüimebaev was the äkim of to Turkistan Region on 19 June 2018, he was reappointed to the post the following day on 20 June. During his tenure, a number of Turkish investors were attracted to the region, which contributed the development of small and medium-sized businesses. In an attempt to attract young skilled workers, two-story residential complexes were built and urban development in the city of Shymkent before it became its own autonomy such as the improvement of the Koshkarata River as well as its banks. A list of historical monuments and holy places of the city and region was compiled, which were converted into tourist sites and more than 10 large industrial production facilities and workplaces were opened.

On 26 February 2019, he was relieved from the post and succeeded by Agriculture Minister Umirzak Shukeyev following cabinet reshuffle in the government. Days later on 28 February, Tüimebaev was appointed as a deputy chairman of Assembly of People of Kazakhstan (QHA). On 5 February 2021, it was revealed that Tüimebaev was chosen to be the rector of Al-Farabi Kazakh National University. As a result, he was relieved from the post on 10 February as QHA deputy chairman by President Kassym-Jomart Tokayev.
