= Askar Myrzakhmetov =

Kazakh politician (born 1962)

- Асқар Мырзахметов
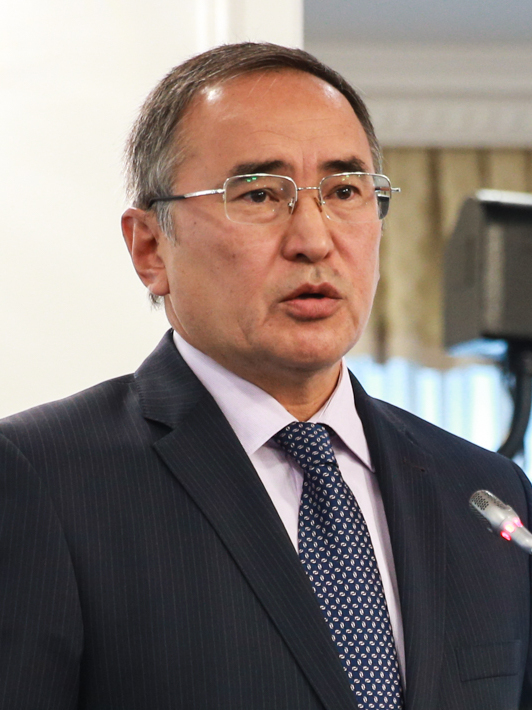
- Myrzakhmetov in 2019

Minister of Agriculture
- In office 6 May 2016 – 15 December 2017
- President: Nursultan Nazarbayev
- Prime Minister: Baqytjan Sagyntayev; Karim Massimov
- Preceded by: Asyljan Mamytbekov
- Succeeded by: Umirzak Shukeyev
- In office 25 August 2005 – 19 January 2006
- Prime Minister: Daniyal Akhmetov
- Preceded by: Serik Umbetov
- Succeeded by: Ahmedjan Yessimov

Äkim of Jambyl Region
- In office 10 January 2018 – 10 February 2020
- Preceded by: Karim Kokirekbaev
- Succeeded by: Berdibek Saparbayev

Äkim of South Kazakhstan Region
- In office 4 March 2009 – 8 August 2015
- Preceded by: Nurgali Ashimov
- Succeeded by: Beibut Atamkulov

First Deputy Chairman of Nur Otan
- In office 8 August 2015 – 6 May 2016
- Chairman: Nursultan Nazarbayev
- Preceded by: Bauyrjan Baibek
- Succeeded by: Mukhtar Kul-Mukhammed

Personal details
- Born: 1 October 1962 (age 63) Chimkent, Chimkent Oblast, Kazakh SSR, Soviet Union
- Party: Nur Otan

Asqar İsabekūly Myrzahmetov (Note: Often transliterated as Askar Isabekovich Myrzakhmetov through a Russified Romanization of Аскар Исабекович Мырзахметов.) (Kazakh: Асқар Исабекұлы Мырзахметов; born 1 October 1962) is a Kazakh politician who served as Counsellor of the Prime Minister of Kazakhstan and First Vice Minister of Agriculture from 1997 to 2006. He was the Ambassador to Uzbekistan in 2006 and 2007.

A native of Chimkent and long-standing member of the ruling Nur Otan party, Myrzahmetov is most notable as a former akim of both South Kazakhstan and Jambyl Regions, as well as Minister of Agriculture.

== Early life and education ==
Askar Myrzakhmetov was born on 1 October 1962. He graduated from the Kazakh National Agrarian University and completed graduate studies at the All-Union Research Institute of Livestock, earning the title of Candidate of Agricultural Sciences.

== Career ==
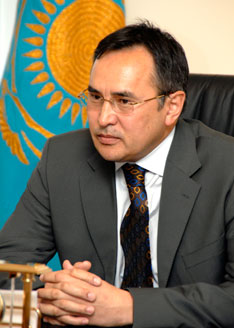
Myrzakhmetov in 2009

He began his career as an academic employee within the Eastern Department of the All-Union Academy of Agricultural Sciences. From 1991 to 1995, he served as Vice President of the joint-stock company "Republican Construction Exchange Kazakhstan" and Chairman of the Board of the Association of Exchange of Central Asia and Kazakhstan, known as "Electronic Store". He then held the position of CEO at the investment firm Tasmo (1995–1996) and at Agro-Leasing (1996–1999). During this time, he also served as a freelance advisor to the Prime Minister of Kazakhstan (1997–1999) and was Chairman of the Council of the Forum of Entrepreneurs of Kazakhstan from March to August 1999.

Myrzakhmetov was appointed Vice Minister of Agriculture in August 1999 and served until June 2002. Concurrently, he chaired and was a member of the Board of Directors of "Prodcorporation". In June 2002, he became the First Vice Minister of Agriculture and, by presidential decree on 25 August 2005, was appointed Minister of Agriculture.

On 26 April 2006, he was appointed Ambassador of Kazakhstan to Uzbekistan, serving until 18 September 2007. From then until March 2009, he led the National Company Socio-Entrepreneurship Corporation "Ontustik" in Shymkent, South Kazakhstan Region. On 4 March 2009, he was appointed akim(Governor) of the South Kazakhstan Region, a position he held until 8 August 2015, when he became First Deputy Chairman of the Nur Otan Party.

On 6 May 2016, Myrzakhmetov returned as Minister of Agriculture and, on 14 June 2016, was also appointed Deputy Prime Minister, concurrently heading the national commission on land reform. He was relieved of both posts on 15 December 2017.

On 10 January 2018, he was appointed Akim of the Jambyl Region, serving until his release from the position on 10 February 2020.

== Awards ==
- Order of Parasat (2018);
- Order of Kurmet (2010);
- Order of Friendship (September 10, 2013, Russia);
- Medal "20 years of independence of the Republic of Kazakhstan" (2011);
- State Prize of the Republic of Kazakhstan in the field of literature and art (2014).
