= Kazakhstan's 6th electoral district =

Electoral district No. 6
- Kazakh: №6 сайлау округі Russian: Избирательный округ №6
- Single-mandate constituency for the Mäjilis
- District: Abai, Turan, and Al-Farabi
- City: Almaty (2004–2007); Shymkent (2022–present)

Current constituency
- Created: 2022
- Seats: 1
- Party: Amanat
- Deputy: Danabek Isabekov
- Elected: 2023

The Electoral district No. 6 (Kazakh: №6 сайлау округі, romanized: №6 sailau okrugı; Russian: Избирательный округ №6) is a single-mandate territorial constituency in Kazakhstan, represented in the lower chamber Mäjilis of the Parliament. It is located in the city of Shymkent and includes the districts of Abai, Turan, and Al-Farabi.

The constituency was originally formed for the 2004 legislative election and existed until being abolished in 2007. However, it has been reestablished in 2022 and is currently represented by deputy Danabek Isabekov (Amanat) since March 2023.

== Geography ==
The Electoral district No. 6 is situated in the southwestern part of Shymkent and includes the city districts of Abai, Turan, and Al-Farabi. It shares borders with Shymkent No. 7 to the northwest, along with Turkistan Region No. 25 to the west, Turkistan Region No. 27 to the southwest, and Turkistan Region No. 26 to the south.

== History ==
The Electoral district No. 6 was formed for the 2004 legislative election as a result of redistribution originally within the boundaries of Almaty, and Sergey Dyachenko served as deputy from the constituency. From there, the electoral district continued to exist until its dissolution following the 2007 constitutional amendment, which led to the abolition of all constituencies as part of the transition from a mixed-member majoritarian representation to a fully party-list proportional representation system. The change affected the composition of all seats in the lower chamber Mäjilis of the Kazakh Parliament beginning with the 2007 legislative election.

On 24 December 2022, the Electoral district No. 6 was reestablished by the Central Election Commission in the city of Shymkent, which came into effect on 1 January 2023 as a result of the 2022 amendment. The adoption of this amendment marked the reintroduction of a mixed electoral system for electing Mäjilis deputies, with the use of numbered constituencies being reinstated for the first time since 2004. It made its debut in the 2023 legislative election, with Danabek Isabekov becoming the elected representative of the constituency.

== Deputies ==
| Election | Member | Party | % | Representing region |
|---|---|---|---|---|
| 2004 | Sergey Dyachenko | Otan | 53.0 | Almaty |
| 2007 | Defunct (Single-nationwide PR constituency) | | | |
| 2012 | Defunct (Single-nationwide PR constituency) | | | |
| 2016 | Defunct (Single-nationwide PR constituency) | | | |
| 2021 | Defunct (Single-nationwide PR constituency) | | | |
| 2023 | Danabek Isabekov | Amanat | 36.8 | Shymkent |

== Election results ==
=== 2023 ===
| Candidate | Party | Votes | % |
|---|---|---|---|
| Danabek Isabekov | Amanat | 21,098 | 36.80 |
| Ğalymjan Äbişev | Independent | 8,430 | 14.70 |
| Amalbek Ömirtai | Independent | 8,002 | 13.96 |
| Säken Qanybekov | Independent | 6,855 | 11.96 |
| Asqar Jumağulov | Independent | 2,476 | 4.32 |
| Marat Qudaibergenov | Independent | 2,289 | 3.99 |
| Ziadaş Izbasarova | Independent | 2,285 | 3.99 |
| Ilias Narğoziev | People's Party of Kazakhstan | 1,000 | 1.74 |
| Against all | | 4,895 | 8.54 |
| Total | | 57,330 | 100.00 |
| Valid votes | | 57,330 | 83.25 |
| Invalid/blank votes | | 11,538 | 16.75 |
| Total votes | | 68,868 | 100.00 |
| Amanat gain | | | |
Source: CEC
