= List of Äkims of Turkistan Region =

This is the list of äkıms of Türkıstan Region that have occupied the post since 1992.

== List of Äkıms ==
=== Şymkent Region (1992) ===
- Mars Ürkımbaev (6 February 1992 – 6 July 1992)

=== South Kazakhstan Region (1992–2018) ===
- Mars Ürkımbaev (6 July 1992 – 3 December 1993)
- Zauytbek Tūrysbekov (3 December 1993 – 9 December 1997)
- Qalyq Abdullaev (9 December 1997 – 26 July 1999)
- Berdıbek Saparbaev (26 July 1999 – 30 August 2002)
- Bolat Jalqyşiev (30 August 2002 – 20 September 2006)
- Ömırzaq Şökeev (20 September 2006 – 28 August 2007)
- Nūrğali Äşım (28 August 2007 – 4 March 2009)
- Asqar Myrzahmetov (4 March 2009 – 8 August 2015)
- Beibıt Atamqūlov (8 August 2015 – 7 October 2016)
- Janseiıt Tüimebaev (7 October 2016 – 19 June 2018)

=== Türkıstan Region (2018–present) ===
- Janseiıt Tüimebaev (19 June 2018 – 26 February 2019)
- Ömırzaq Şökeev (26 February 2019 – 26 August 2022)
- Darhan Satybaldy (26 August 2022 –6 January 2025)
- Nuralkhan Kusherov (since 6 January 2025)
