= Auezov Home Museum =

Coordinates: 43°14′36″N 76°56′58″E

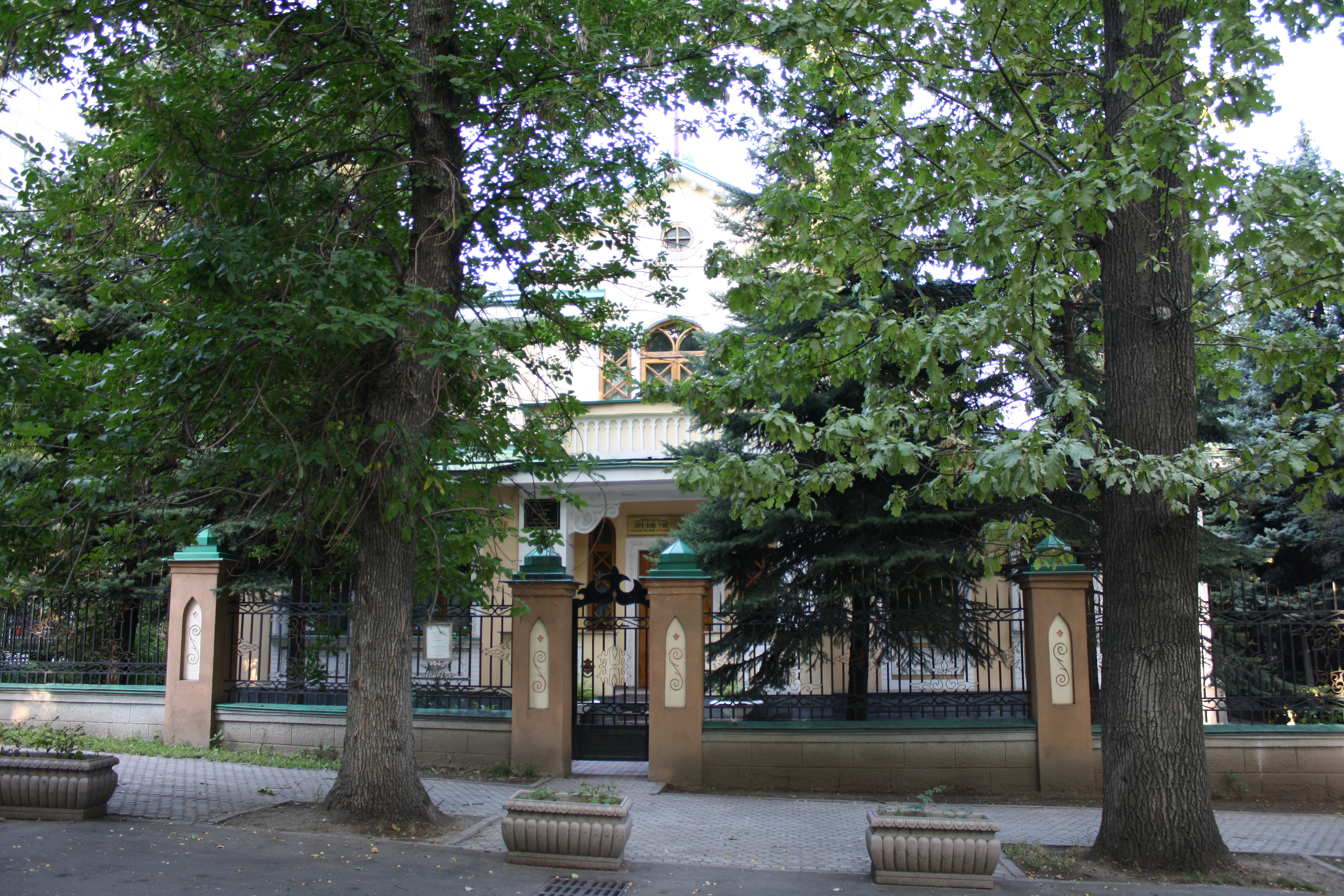
- M.O. Auezov museum building
- Established: 1963
- Location: Almaty, Kazakhstan
- Type: Biographical museum
- Website: http://auezovinstitute.kz/ru/museums/1

The M.O. Auezov Literary and Memorial House Museum (Russian: Дом-музей Ауэзова, tr. dom muzei auezova) is a museum founded in 1963 in Almaty, Kazakhstan, in the house where Mukhtar Auezov lived the last 10 years of his life (1951-1961).

== History ==
The Mukhtar Auezov House Museum was opened in 1963. The first director of the museum was Auezov's daughter, L. M. Auezova. Here the epic novel The Path of Abay was completed, work on a new novel about modernity began, and a number of works of fiction (plays, essays) and research papers were created.

== Museum exhibition ==
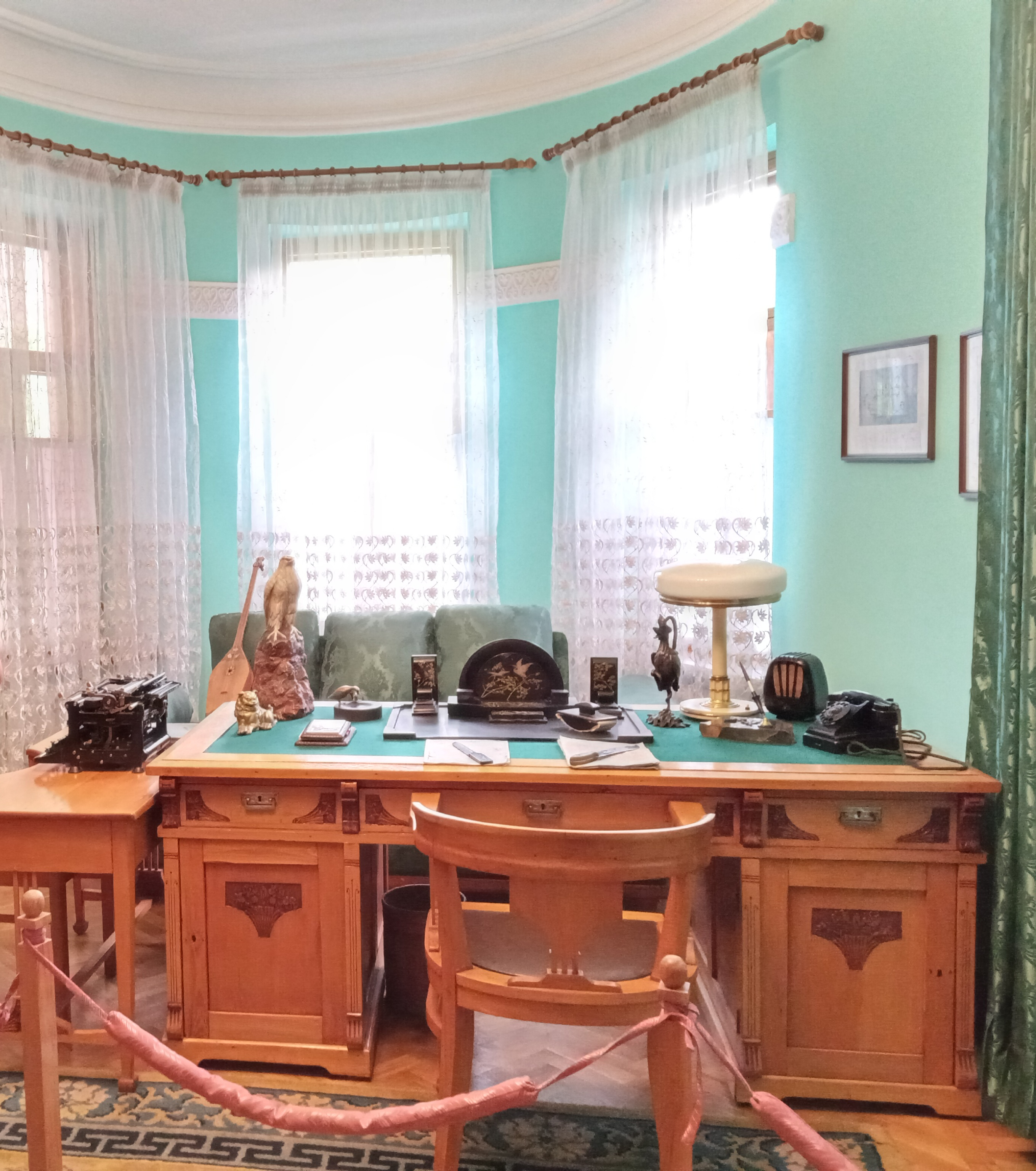
Write table of Muhtar Auez and the dombyra in sofa etc.

The museum building includes the workroom where Mukhtar Auezov spent time working on his creations. Along with Auezov's personal archive and library in the collections of the museum there are more than 150 thousand exhibits in the form of memorial items, works of art, photographs and others. Along with cultural and educational work the museum conducts research works on collecting, studying and promotion of Auezov's creations.

== Museum building ==
Mukhtar Auezov received the Stalin Prize for his epic The Path of Abay in 1949, with the help of which he bought a plot of land from two teachers. Construction began in 1949 and was completed in 1951. The architect of the building was Georgy Gerasimov, who also contributed to the construction of the Abay Opera House.

The museum building was rebuilt in 1995–1997, designed by architect S. Mataibekov. The reconstruction was due to the need to expand the exposition of the museum and writer's anniversary. In 1997, for Auezov's hundredth birthday, the museum opened a new location in a courtyard annex. There was a new exposition room, where historical photographs and books are displayed. There are also other artifacts that were used by Auezov during his lifetime.

== Monument Status ==
On 4 April 1979 the decision of the executive committee of the Alma-Ata city council of people's deputies No. 139 "On approval of the list of historical and cultural monuments of the city of Alma-Ata" was adopted, which included the building of the house-museum.

On 26 January 1982, the building was included in the list of historical and cultural monuments of national importance in the Kazakh Soviet Socialist Republic.
