= Umirzak Shukeyev =

Kazakh politician (born 1964)

- Өмірзақ Шөкеев
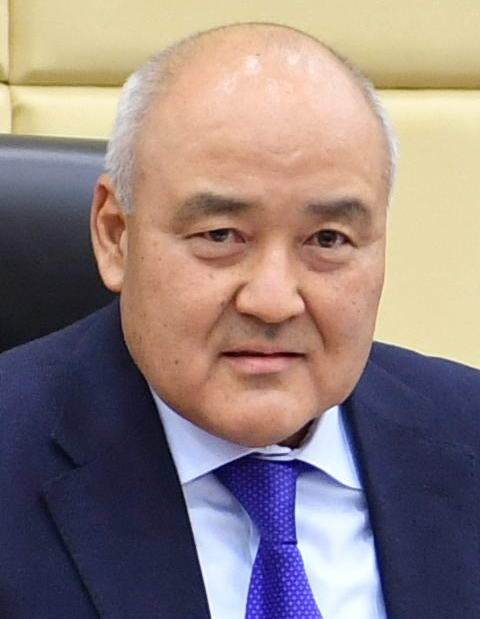
- Shukeyev in 2019

First Deputy Prime Minister of Kazakhstan
- In office 3 March 2009 – 26 December 2011
- Prime Minister: Karim Massimov
- Preceded by: Grigori Marchenko (2004)
- Succeeded by: Serik Akhmetov (2012)

Deputy Prime Minister of Kazakhstan
- In office 27 August 2007 – 3 March 2009
- Prime Minister: Karim Massimov
- In office 12 July 1997 – 10 October 1997
- Prime Minister: Akezhan Kazhegeldin

Minister of Agriculture
- In office 15 December 2017 – 25 February 2019
- President: Nursultan Nazarbayev
- Prime Minister: Bakhytzhan Sagintayev; Askar Mamin (Acting)
- Preceded by: Askar Myrzakhmetov
- Succeeded by: Saparhan Omarov

Minister of Economy and Trade
- In office 13 November 1995 – 10 October 1997
- President: Nursultan Nazarbayev
- Prime Minister: Akezhan Kazhegeldin
- Preceded by: Altay Tileuberdin (Economy)
- Succeeded by: Zhaksybek Kulekeyev (Economy)

Äkim of Turkistan Region
- In office 26 February 2019 – 26 August 2022
- Preceded by: Zhanseit Tuymenbayev

Äkim of South Kazakhstan Region
- In office 20 September 2006 – 28 August 2007
- Preceded by: Bolat Jylkyshiev
- Succeeded by: Nurgali Ashim

Äkim of Kostanay Region
- In office 19 August 1998 – 20 March 2004
- Preceded by: Toqtarbai Qadambaev
- Succeeded by: Sergey Kulagin

Äkim of Astana
- In office 20 March 2004 – 20 September 2006
- Preceded by: Temirkhan Dosmukhanbetov
- Succeeded by: Askar Mamin

Personal details
- Born: 12 March 1964 (age 62) Turkistan, Kazakh SSR, Soviet Union
- Children: 3
- Education: Moscow State University of Economics, Statistics, and Informatics

Umirzak Shukeyev (Kazakh: Ömırzaq Estaiūly Şökeev, Өмірзақ Естайұлы Шөкеев; born 12 March 1964) is a Kazakh politician who has served as the akim of Turkistan Region since 2019. Prior to that, he served as the Minister of Agriculture from 2017 to 2019, chairman of Samruk-Kazyna, Kazakhstan's sovereign wealth fund from 2011 to 2017, First Deputy Prime Minister from 2009 to 2011, and prior to that, Deputy Prime Minister from 2007, akim of South Kazakhstan from 2006 to 2007, akim of Astana from 2004 to 2006, akim of Kostanay Region from 1998 to 2004, Minister of Economy and Trade from 1995 to 1997 while serving as Deputy Prime Minister.

== Biography ==
=== Early life and career ===
Shukeyev was born in Turkistan. He graduated from the Moscow Economics and Statistics Institute in 1986, after having studied economics and mathematics. After graduating, he was employed as junior and leading research fellow in a number of research facilities in Almaty.

From 1992, Shukeyev on to work as a consultant with the Supreme Economic Council under the President; as an advisor to the President for economic issues; vice head of the Finance, Labor and Social Protection of the Population Department in the Presidential Service and in the Cabinet.

In 1993, he became the deputy head of Administration of South Kazakhstan Region.

=== Political career ===
In November 1995, Shukeyev was appointed as the Minister of Economy. While serving from the position, he became the Deputy Prime Minister of Kazakhstan in July 1997 until dissolution of the government in October 1997. From February to November 1997, Shukeyev was a member of the Supreme Economic Council under the President and then a member National Council for Sustainable Development of Kazakhstan from November 1997 to August 1998. In March 1997, Shukeyev became a chairman of the Supervisory Board of Kazakhoil CJSC and served that position until December 1997. In April 1998, Shukeyev became the deputy head of the Presidential Administration of Kazakhstan.

On 19 August 1998, Shukeyev was appointed as the akim of Kostanay Region. Later he served as the akim of Astana from 20 March 2004 until being appointed as the akim of South Kazakhstan Region on 20 September 2006.

On 27 August 2007, Shukeyev was appointed as the Deputy Prime Minister of Kazakhstan under Massimov's cabinet until he became the First Deputy Prime Minister from 3 March 2009, making him the first person to hold such post since 2004. He was dismissed from duties on 26 December 2011 and the following day on 27 December, Shukeyev became the chairman and the member of the Board of Directors of the JSC Samruk-Kazyna.

On 15 December 2017, Shukeyev became the Minister of Agriculture. After the government was dismissed on 21 February 2019, he was shortly appointed as the akim of Turkistan Region on 25 February 2019 – 26 August 2022.

== Awards ==
- Awarded the Order of Parasat.
