= Deputy speaker =

A deputy speaker could refer to the following posts:

- Deputy Speaker of the Grand National Assembly (Turkey)
- Deputy Speaker of the Lok Sabha (India)
- Deputy Speaker of the House of Representatives of Nigeria
- Deputy Speaker of the House of Representatives of Malta
- Deputy Speaker of the National Assembly of Pakistan
- Deputy Speaker of the House of Representatives of the Philippines
- Deputy speaker and chairman of committees of the Parliament of Sri Lanka
- Deputy Chairman of the Kurultai (Kazakhstan)

== See also ==
- Speaker (politics)
