= Nurlan Sauranbaev =

Kazakh politician

Nūrlan Sauranbaev
- Нұрлан Сауранбаев
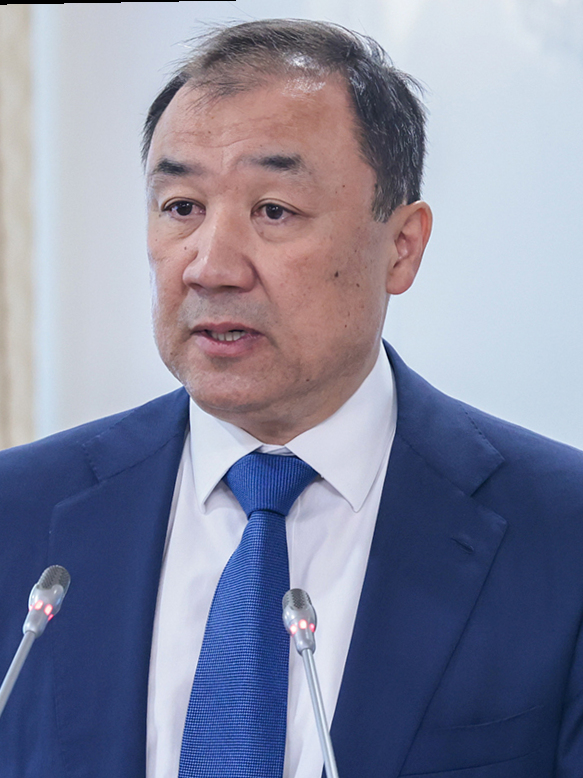
- Sauranbaev in 2025

Minister of Transport of Kazakhstan
- In office 30 June 2025 – 3 November 2026
- President: Kassym-Jomart Tokayev
- Prime Minister: Oljas Bektenov
- Preceded by: Marat Qarabayev
- Succeeded by: Assel Janassova

CEO of Kazakhstan Temir Joly
- In office 8 April 2021 – 30 June 2025
- Preceded by: Sauat Mynbayev
- Succeeded by: Talğat Aldybergenov

Äkim of Shymkent
- In office 7 November 2017 – 20 June 2018
- Preceded by: Ğabidolla Äbdirahimov
- Succeeded by: Ğabidolla Äbdirahimov

Personal details
- Born: 20 May 1967 (age 59) Dzhambul, Kazakh SSR, Soviet Union (now Taraz, Kazakhstan)
- Spouse: Gauhar Sauranbaeva
- Children: 5
- Education: S. M. Kirov Kazakh State University; National Defense University
- Awards: Order of Barys; Order of Kurmet; Order of Parasat; Medal "20 Years of Independence of the Republic of Kazakhstan"

Nūrlan Ermekūly Sauranbaev (Note: Often transliterated as Nurlan Yermekovich Sauranbayev through a Russified Romanization of Нурлан Ермекович Сауранбаев.) (Kazakh: Нұрлан Ермекұлы Сауранбаев; born 20 May 1967) is a Kazakh politician who is served as Minister of Transport of Kazakhstan from 2025 to 2026. Previously, he was chairman of the Management Board of Kazakhstan Temir Joly (KTJ) from 2021 to 2025, and äkim of Shymkent from 2017 to 2018.

== Biography ==
=== Early life and education ===
Sauranbaev was born in Dzhambul (now Taraz). In 1991, he graduated from Kazakh State University named after S. M. Kirov.

In 2001–2002, he completed studies at the Faculty of Petroleum Administration of the ENI–Agip Oil Industry Training Center. In 2016, he earned a master's degree in military and public administration from the National Defense University named after the First President of the Republic of Kazakhstan – Elbasy.

=== Career ===
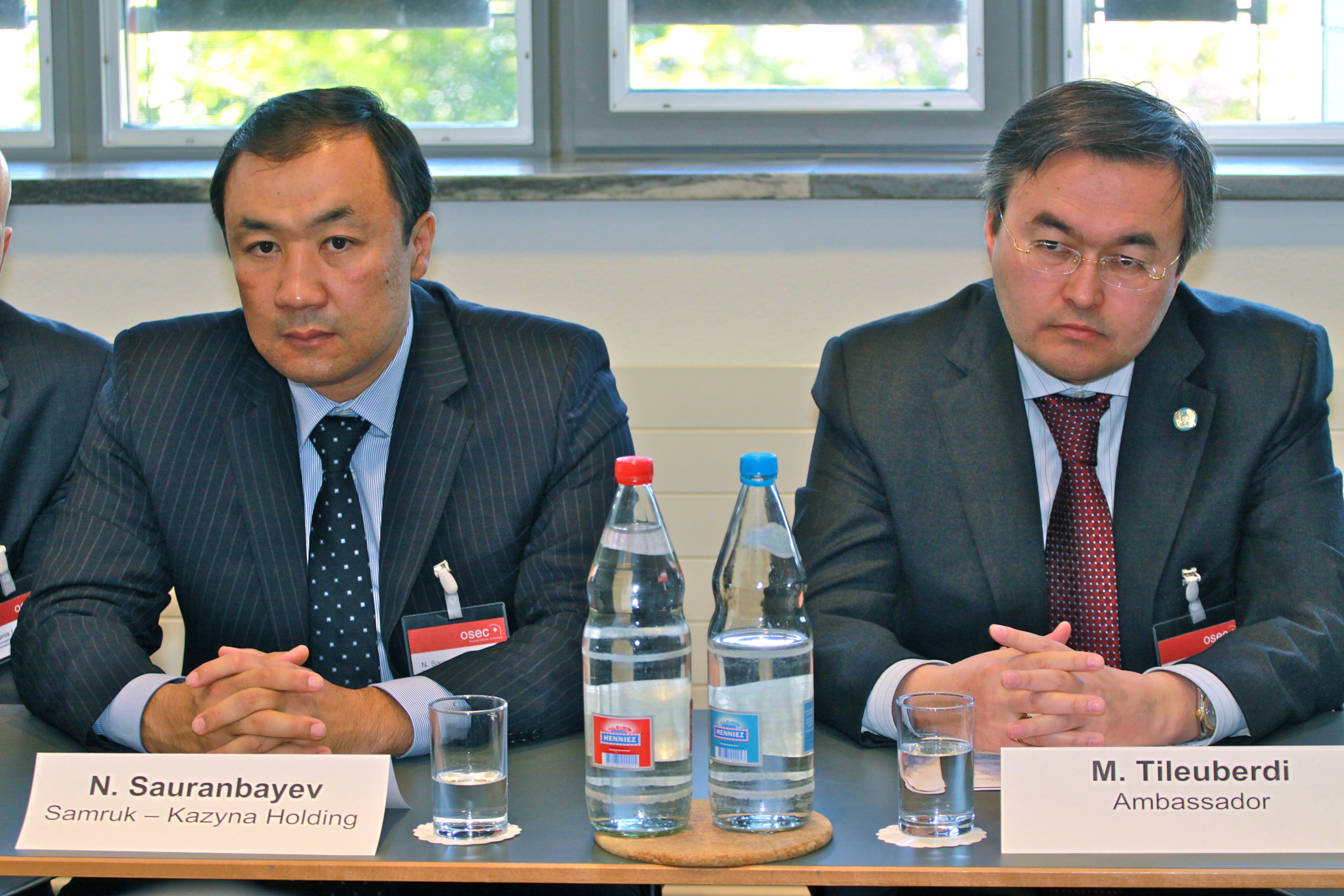
Managing Director of Samruk-Kazyna Sauranbayev (left) and Ambassador of Kazakhstan to Austria Mukhtar Tleuberdi in Vienna, April 2011

Sauranbaev began his professional career in 1991 as General Director of the Enbek company, a position he held until 1997. From 1997 to 1998, he served as executive director of the Congress of Entrepreneurs of Kazakhstan.

In 1998, he was appointed director of the Passenger Transportation State Enterprise within Kazakhstan Railways, serving in that role until 2000. Between 2000 and 2002, he worked as first vice president of the Atyrau Refinery, after which he became director of the Engineering and Services Department at KazMunayGas, a post he held from 2002 to 2004. From 2004 to 2007, he served as deneral director of TenizService LLP.

From July 2007 to June 2010, Sauranbaev held senior positions at KazMunayGas as managing director for Oil Transportation and Managing Director for Service Projects.

On 18 May 2011, he was appointed Vice Minister of Industry and New Technologies of the Republic of Kazakhstan, a position he held until 25 August 2014. He subsequently served as Deputy Minister of Defense from 14 August 2014 until October 2016.

On 7 November 2017, Sauranbaev was appointed akim of Shymkent, serving in that role until 20 June 2018, after which Shymkent was designated to the status of a city of republican significance.

He later headed the Department of State Control and Organizational and Territorial Work of the Administration of the President of the Republic of Kazakhstan from 16 January 2019 to 8 April 2021.

From 8 April 2021 to 30 June 2025, he served as chairman of the Management Board of the national company Kazakhstan Temir Joly.

On 30 June 2025, he was appointed Minister of Transport of the Republic of Kazakhstan by President Kassym-Jomart Tokayev. On 3 November 2026, Sauranbaev was dismissed from the post.

== Other positions ==
- Member, Board of Directors, KazTransOil JSC (April 2008)
- Member, Board of Directors, KazMunayGas NC JSC (November 2010 – June 2011)
- Member, Board of Directors, Kazakhstan Engineering NC JSC (September 2014 – January 2015)
- Chairman, Board of Directors, Kazakhstan Engineering NC JSC (January 2015)
- Since February 2017: head of the organizing committee for preparation and holding of EXPO-2017.

== Awards ==
- Order of Barys, 3rd degree (1 August 2025)
- Order of Kurmet (2016)
- Order of Parasat (2007)
- Medal "20 Years of Independence of the Republic of Kazakhstan" (2011)
