= Shymkent City Mäslihat =

Legislature of Shymkent, Kazakhstan

Shymkent City Mäslihat Шымкент қалалық мәслихаты
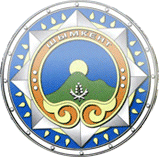

Type
- Type: Unicameral

History
- Founded: 10 December 1993
- Preceded by: Shymkent City Soviet

Leadership
- Secretary: Gani Tashqaraev
- Seats: 29

Elections
- Last election: 20 March 2016
- Next election: 10 January 2021

Website
- shymkent-maslihat.kz

The Shymkent City Mäslihat (Kazakh: Шымкент қалалық мәслихаты, romanized: Şymkent qalalyq mäslihaty) is a unicameral legislature of the city of Shymkent. The councillors of the City Mäslihat are elected concurrently with the MPs of the Mazhilis.

== Composition ==
The City Mäslihat is composed of 29 councillors who are represented by single-member constituency and are elected by a secret ballot every 5 years according to the Clause 2 of Article 86 of the Constitution of Kazakhstan, Section VIII "Local state government and self-government". However, on 23 May 2018, it was announced that all members of Mäslihat bodies will be elected through proportional representation. The law was approved on 29 June 2018 through a constitutional amendment and came into force starting from 1 January 2019.

== History ==
The Mäslihat was established on 10 December 1993 after the Supreme Council of Kazakhstan adopted the law "On local representative and executive bodies of the Republic of Kazakhstan", which made significant changes to the name and structure of local state bodies. The city held the elections on 10 March 1994 to elect the councillors of the 1st convocation of the City Mäslihat.

In June 2018, the city was granted as a status of "republican significance", thus separating itself from the Turkistan Region. That same year, the city councillors for the first time voted for a Senator to represent the newly created subdivision.

== Convocations ==
- 1st (1994–1999)
- 2nd (1999–2004)
- 3rd (2004–2007)
- 4th (2007–2012)
- 5th (2012–2016)
- 6th (2016–2021)
