= Auezov South Kazakhstan State University =

University in Shymkent, Kazakhstan

Coordinates: 42.32027567488979°N 69.59149270986141°E

M. O. Auezov South Kazakhstan State University
- М. О. Әуезов атындағы Оңтүстік Қазақстан мемлекеттік университеті
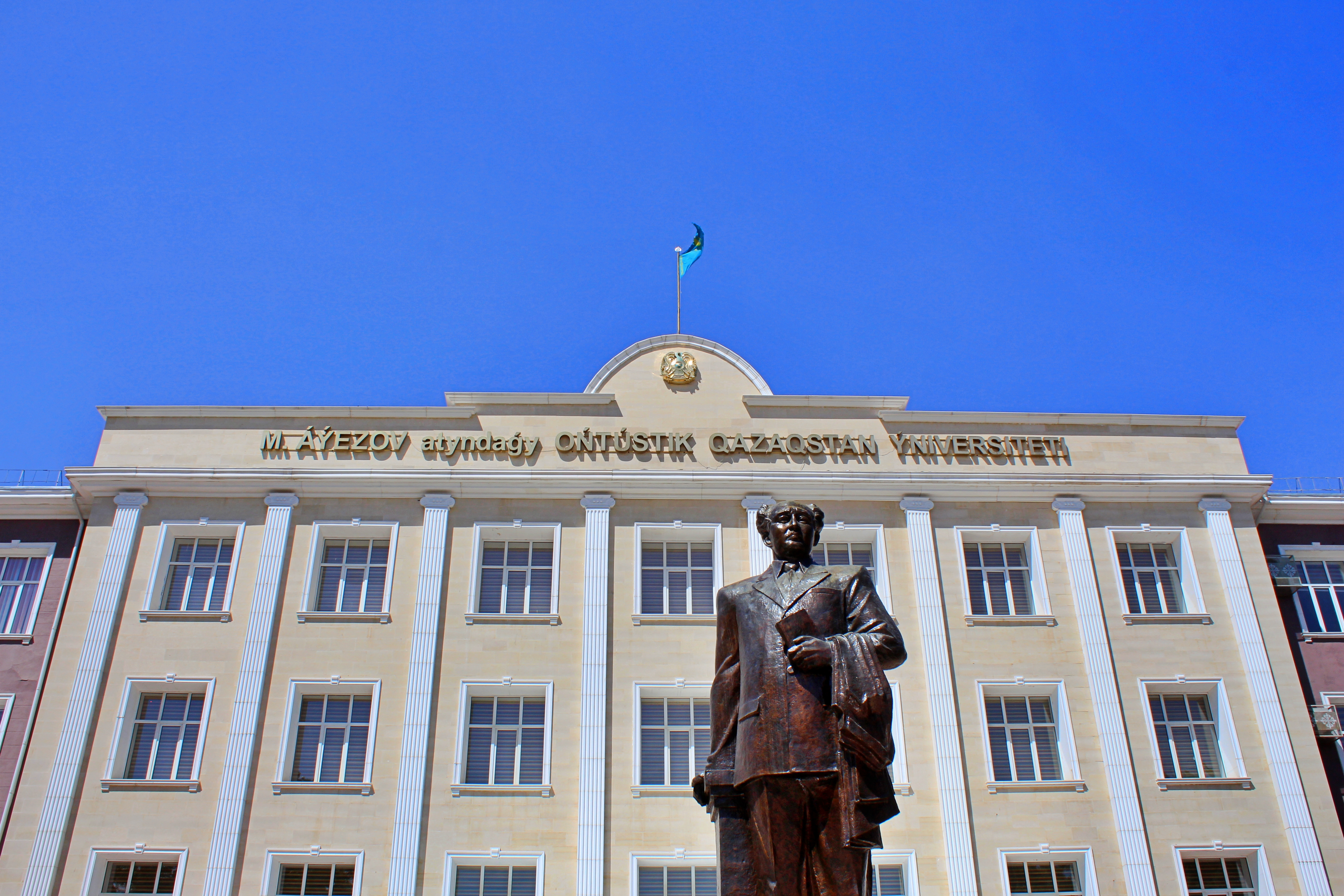
- Other names: UKGU
- Former names: Mukhtar Omarkhanuli Auezov South Kazakhstan University
- Type: Public
- Established: 1943
- Rector: Daria Qojamjarova
- Administrative staff: 2,676
- Students: 17,303
- Location: Tauke Khan Avenue, 5, Shymkent, Kazakhstan
- Campus: urban
- Website: ukgu.kz
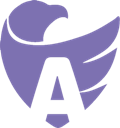

University rankings

Global – Overall
- QS World: 731-740 (2026)

Regional – Overall
- QS Emerging Europe and Central Asia: 96 (2022)

The M. O. Auezov South Kazakhstan State University (Kazakh: М. О. Әуезов атындағы Оңтүстік Қазақстан мемлекеттік университеті, romanized: M. O. Äuezov atyndağy Oñtüstık Qazaqstan memlekettık universitetı) also known as Mukhtar Auezov South Kazakhstan University, is a multidisciplinary higher educational institution in the city of Shymkent, which provides training in 76 technical and humanitarian specialties. It was founded in 1943.

== History ==
The university is named after the popular Kazakh writer and social activist Mukhtar Omarkhanuli Auezov. During the height of the World War II in the Soviet Union, the Council of People's Commissars of the USSR on 19 June 1943 decided to establish the Technological Institute of Building Materials in accordance with Resolution No. 679B. On June 29 of the same year, the All-Union Committee for Higher Education under the USSR People's Commissariat and the USSR Commissioner for Building Materials issued an order "On the organization of the Technological Institute of Building Materials in Chimkent, Kazakh SSR."

The building of the pedagogical school on Sovetskaya Street (now Kazybek Bi) was transferred to the university. Konstantin Delyaur from Kharkiv was appointed the head of the newly opened school. He is considered to have made a great contribution to the opening of the institute, bringing to the highest authorities the need for urgent training of qualified specialists needed in the construction industry.

In 2021, the university was named as one of the top 500 universities in the world.

== Faculties ==
- Agroindustrial Faculty
- Natural-pedagogical Faculty
- Faculty of Evening and Distance Learning
- Higher School of Information Technology
- Faculty of Light and Food Industry
- Faculty of Mechanics and Oil and Gas Business
- Faculty of Pedagogy
- Faculty of work with foreign students and pre-university training
- Faculty of Construction and Transport
- Faculty of Culture and Sports
- Faculty of Philology
- Faculty of Economics and Finance
- Faculty of Law and International Relations
- Faculty of Chemical Technology
- Military Department
