= First Bektenov Government =

15th government of Kazakhstan

- 19th Cabinet of Kazakhstan
- 6 February 2024
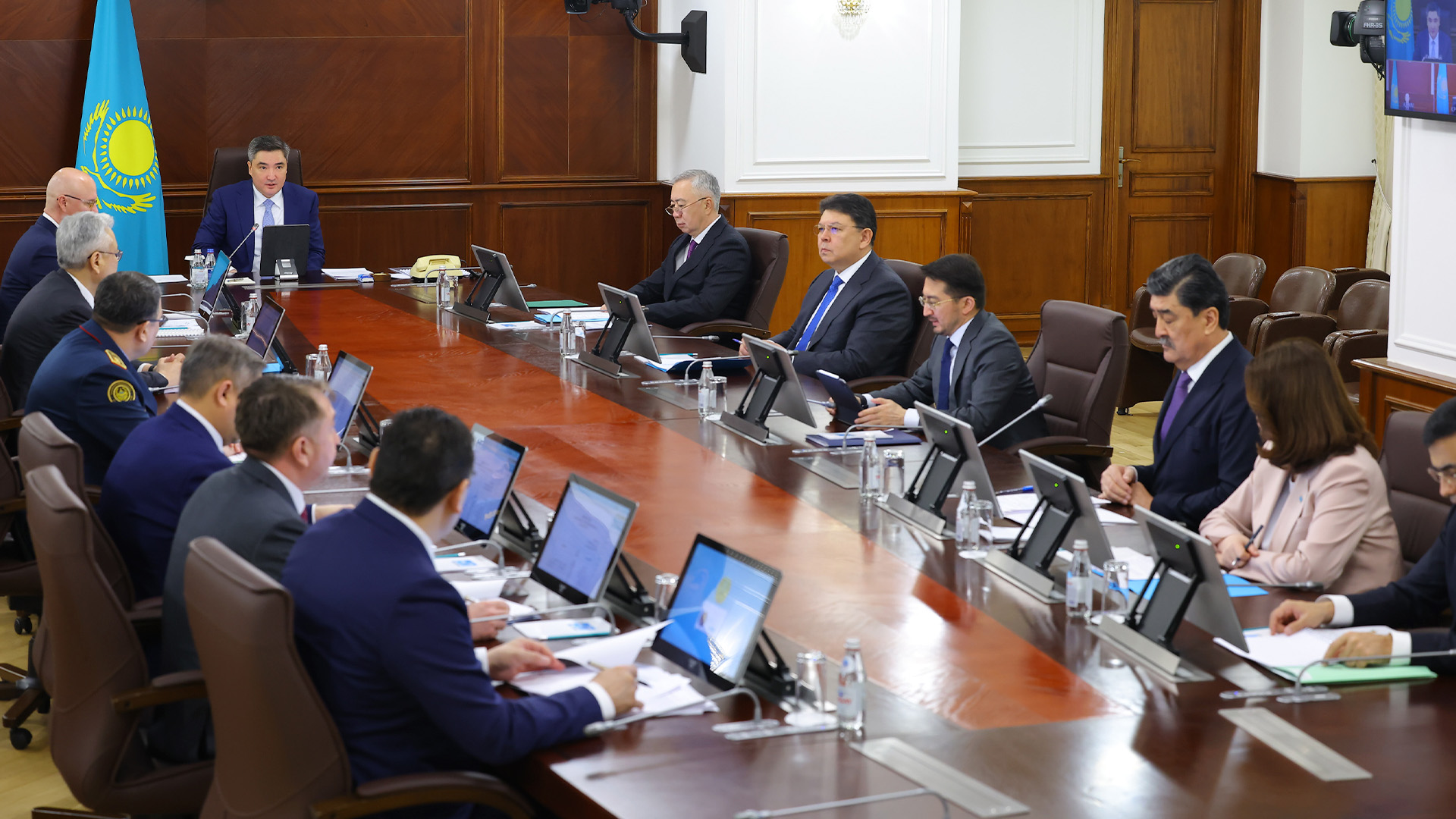
- A cabinet meeting chaired by Prime Minister Bektenov, March 2026
- Date formed: 6 February 2024
- Date dissolved: 28 August 2026

People and organisations
- Head of state: Kassym-Jomart Tokayev
- Head of government: Oljas Bektenov
- Deputy head of government: Nurlybek Nalibaev
- Total no. of members: 25
- Member party: Ädilet; Independent
- Status in legislature: Majority
- Opposition parties: Auyl; Aq Jol; JSDP; QHP; Respublica

History
- Legislature term: 2023–2026
- Budgets: 2025–27; 2026–28
- Predecessor: Smaiylov II
- Successor: Bektenov II

The First Bektenov Government (Kazakh: Бектенов бірінші үкіметі; Russian: Первое правительство Бектенова) was the 19th government of Kazakhstan under the leadership of Prime Minister Oljas Bektenov. The government was formed on 6 February 2024, after Bektenov was appointed as the PM by President Kassym-Jomart Tokayev and received parliamentary approval, succeeding the previous cabinet led by Älihan Smaiylov. The initial composition of the cabinet featured four newly appointed ministers.

== History ==
=== Formation ===
In late January 2024, news media outlets reported information from an insider source indicating that the government led by Prime Minister Älihan Smaiylov was on the brink of resignation. The likelihood of resignation was further corroborated by Senate Chairman Mäulen Äşimbaev during a press briefing on 1 February 2024, where he indicated that assessments of certain ministers' activities would be addressed at an expanded government meeting for 7 February. This development sparked speculation among pundits ahead of the expanded government meeting, while insiders hinted at possible ministerial resignations. Potential candidates speculated to succeed Smaiylov as PM included presidential advisor Kanat Bozumbayev, Zhenis Kassymbek and Erbolat Dosaev, the akims of Astana and Almaty, respectively, along with deputy prime ministers Roman Sklyar, Murat Nurtleu, Serik Jumanğarin, and Erulan Jamaubaev, as well as the Mäjilis chairman, Erlan Qoşanov.

On 5 February 2024, President Kassym-Jomart Tokayev issued a decree dismissing Smaiylov's government and appointing Roman Sklyar as the acting prime minister.

On 6 February 2024, the ruling Amanat party chairman, Erlan Qoşanov, endorsed Oljas Bektenov for the position of prime minister. President Tokayev then nominated Bektenov for the post, receiving support from the Amanat, Auyl, Respublica, and Aq Jol factions during the plenary session of the lower house Mäjilis. However, the People's Party of Kazakhstan and Nationwide Social Democratic Party abstained from voting on Bektenov's candidacy, expressing concerns about his ability to fulfill tasks set by Tokayev and his inexperienced track record in implementing economic projects.

=== Parliamentary vote ===
Bektenov was confirmed as prime minister by the Mäjilis deputies on 6 February 2024, and subsequently appointed by Tokayev through a presidential decree.

Mäjilis confirmation, 6 February 2024
For		Against		Abstained		Did not vote		Vacant	
69	70.4%	0	0.0%	7	7.1%	21	21.4%	1	1.0%
Source: Parlam.kz

=== Dissolution ===
In August 2026, on the day of the 2026 Kazakh legislative election, President Tokayev announced that the Bektenov Government would soon resign. He praised its continuing work, but noted that a government reshuffle would be necessary to achieve modernisation amid constitutional reform, which included the creation of a national unicameral legislature, the Kurultai, instead of the previously bicameral Parliament of Kazakhstan.

== Assessment ==
Just as the Bektenov Government was formed, Kazakh political scientist Dosym Satpaev remarked that not much is to be expected from it, stating that most of the Second Smaiylov Government is still intact anyway, and adding that the Government of Kazakhstan is, as always, as divided as it is in many other authoritarian states, and therefore does not affect the political process in the country much.

Near the dissolution of the Government in August 2026, President Kassym-Jomart Tokayev assessed that the Bektenov Government "overall" worked "quite diligently and promptly, carrying out the tasks set by the head of state". He, however, stated that it was necessary for the Bektenov Government to resign in order to carry out further modernisation amid constitutional reform.

== Composition ==
The newly-formed government included mostly former ministers from previous cabinet, with only 4 out of 26 (15.3%) new faces: Prime Minister Oljas Bektenov, National Economy Minister Nurlan Baibazarov, Healthcare Minister Akmaral Alnazarova, Emergency Situation Minister Şyñğys Ärinov, and Finance Minister Mädi Takiev.

Because of poor regional management and the sudden melting of snow, a flood broke out in 10 different regions of Kazakhstan. Because of this, through the presidential decree of Tokayev, Kanat Bozumbayev was appointed as the 7th Deputy PM to Bektenov. During Bektenov's introduction of Bozumbayev to the rest of the cabinet, it was announced that Bozumbayev went to visit the Karaganda Region along the Emergency Situations Minister Şyñğys Ärinov to stabilize the situation. In December 2024, the number of Deputy PMs to Bektenov reduced to 6, as Nurlan Baibazarov resigned and was replaced by colleague Serik Jumanğarin.

Dissolved Ministries
Portfolio	Image	Holder	Term of office	
Portfolio	Image	Holder	Start	End
Head of government
Prime Minister; Премьер-Министр		Oljas Bektenov	6 February 2024	28 August 2026
Deputy Prime Ministers
First Deputy Prime Minister; Премьер-министрдің бірінші орынбасары (Kazakh); Первый заместитель Премьер-Министра (Russian)		Roman Sklyar	11 January 2022	5 May 2026
First Deputy Prime Minister; Премьер-министрдің бірінші орынбасары (Kazakh); Первый заместитель Премьер-Министра (Russian)		Nurlybek Nalibaev	6 May 2026	28 August 2026
Deputy Prime Minister – Chief of Staff of the Government; Премьер-Министрдің орынбасары – Үкімет Аппаратының басшысы (Kazakh); Заместитель Премьер-Министра – Руководитель Аппарата Правительства (Russian)		Galymjan Koishibaev	4 January 2023	28 August 2026
Deputy Prime Minister – Minister of Foreign Affairs; Премьер-Министрдің орынбасары – сыртқы істер министрі (Kazakh); Заместитель Премьер-Министра – министр иностранных дел (Russian)		Murat Nurtleu	3 April 2023	26 September 2025
Deputy Prime Minister; Премьер-Министрдің орынбасары (Kazakh); Заместитель Премьер-Министра (Russian)		Tamara Düisenova	8 June 2023	14 February 2025
Deputy Prime Minister; Премьер-Министрдің орынбасары (Kazakh); Заместитель Премьер-Министра (Russian)		Serik Jumanğarin	2 September 2022	28 August 2026
Deputy Prime Minister – Minister of Artificial Intelligence and Digital Development; Премьер-Министрдің орынбасары – жасанды интеллект және цифрлық даму министрі (Kazakh); Заместитель Премьер-Министра – министр искусственного интеллекта и цифрового развития (Russian)		Jaslan Mädiev	29 September 2025	28 August 2026
Deputy Prime Minister; Премьер-Министрдің орынбасары (Kazakh); Заместитель Премьер-Министра (Russian)		Aida Balaeva	1 December 2025	28 August 2026
Deputy Prime Minister – Minister of National Economy; Премьер-Министрдің орынбасары – ұлттық экономика министрі (Kazakh); Заместитель Премьер-Министра – министр национальной экономики (Russian)		Nurlan Baibazarov	6 February 2024	21 December 2024
Deputy Prime Minister – Minister of National Economy; Премьер-Министрдің орынбасары – ұлттық экономика министрі (Kazakh); Заместитель Премьер-Министра – министр национальной экономики (Russian)		Serik Jumanğarin	21 December 2024	28 August 2026
Deputy Prime Minister; Премьер-Министрдің орынбасары (Kazakh); Заместитель Премьер-Министра (Russian)		Kanat Bozumbayev	31 March 2024	28 August 2026
Government ministers
Minister of Defence; Қорғаныс министрі (Kazakh); Министр обороны (Russian)		Ruslan Jaqsylyqov	6 February 2024	8 June 2025
Minister of Defence; Қорғаныс министрі (Kazakh); Министр обороны (Russian)		Däuren Qosanov	8 June 2025	28 August 2026
Minister of Foreign Affairs; Сыртқы істер министрі (Kazakh); Министр иностранных дел (Russian)		Ermek Köşerbaev	26 September 2025	28 August 2026
Minister of Internal Affairs; Ішкі істер министрі (Kazakh); Министр внутренних дел (Russian)		Erjan Sädenov	2 September 2023	28 August 2026
Minister of Agriculture; Ауыл шаруашылығы министрі (Kazakh); Министр сельского хозяйства (Russian)		Aidarbek Saparov	4 September 2023	28 August 2026
Minister of Justice; Әділет министрі (Kazakh); Министр юстиции (Russian)		Azamat Esqaraev	4 January 2023	9 January 2025
Minister of Justice; Әділет министрі (Kazakh); Министр юстиции (Russian)		Erlan Särsembaev	9 January 2025	28 August 2026
Minister of Education; Оқу-ағарту министрі (Kazakh); Министр просвещения (Russian)		Ğani Beisembaev	4 January 2023	29 September 2025
Minister of Education; Оқу-ағарту министрі (Kazakh); Министр просвещения (Russian)		Juldyz Süleimenova	29 September 2025	28 August 2026
Minister of Science and Higher Education; Ғылым және жоғары білім министрі (Kazakh); Министр науки и высшего образования (Russian)		Saiasat Nurbek	11 June 2022	28 August 2026
Minister of Healthcare; Денсаулық сақтау министрі (Kazakh); Министр здравоохранения (Russian)		Akmaral Alnazarova	6 February 2024	28 August 2026
Minister of Labour and Social Protection of the Population; Еңбек және халықты әлеуметтік қорғау министрі (Kazakh); Министр труда и социальной защиты населения (Russian)		Svetlana Jaqypova	4 September 2023	27 January 2026
Minister of Labour and Social Protection of the Population; Еңбек және халықты әлеуметтік қорғау министрі (Kazakh); Министр труда и социальной защиты населения (Russian)		Asqarbek Ertaev	27 January 2026	28 August 2026
Minister of Transport; Көлік министрі (Kazakh); Министр транспорта (Russian)		Marat Qarabayev	6 February 2024	8 June 2025
Minister of Transport; Көлік министрі (Kazakh); Министр транспорта (Russian)		Nurlan Sauranbaev	8 June 2025	28 August 2026
Minister of Finance; Қаржы министрі (Kazakh); Министр финансов (Russian)		Mädi Takiev	6 February 2024	28 August 2026
Minister of Culture and Information; Мәдениет және ақпарат министрі (Kazakh); Министр культуры и информации (Russian)		Aida Balaeva	6 February 2024	28 August 2026
Minister of Trade and Integration; Сауда және интеграция министрі (Kazakh); Министр торговли и интеграции (Russian)		Arman Şaqqaliev	6 February 2024	28 August 2026
Minister of Industry and Construction; Өнеркәсіп және құрылыс министрі (Kazakh); Министр промышленности и инфраструктурного развития (Russian)		Qanat Şarlapaev	6 February 2024	28 February 2025
Minister of Industry and Construction; Өнеркәсіп және құрылыс министрі (Kazakh); Министр промышленности и инфраструктурного развития (Russian)		Ersaiyn Nağaspaev	28 February 2025	28 August 2026
Ministry of Water Resources and Irrigation; Су ресурстары және ирригация министрі (Kazakh); Министр водных ресурсов и ирригации (Russian)		Nurjan Nurjıgıtov	6 February 2024	28 August 2026
Minister of Emergency Situations; Төтенше жағдайлар министрі (Kazakh); Министр по чрезвычайным ситуациям (Russian)		Şyñğys Ärinov	6 February 2024	28 August 2026
Minister of Tourism and Sports; Туризм және спорт министрі (Kazakh); Министр туризма и спорта (Russian)		Ermek Marjyqpaev	6 February 2024	31 August 2024
Minister of Tourism and Sports; Туризм және спорт министрі (Kazakh); Министр туризма и спорта (Russian)		Erbol Myrzabosynov	2 September 2024	28 August 2026
Minister of Digital Development, Innovation and Aerospace Industry; Цифрлық даму, инновациялар және аэроғарыш өнеркәсібі министрі (Kazakh); Министр цифрового развития, инноваций и аэрокосмической промышленности (Russian)		Bağdat Musin	6 February 2024	30 April 2024
Minister of Digital Development, Innovation and Aerospace Industry; Цифрлық даму, инновациялар және аэроғарыш өнеркәсібі министрі (Kazakh); Министр цифрового развития, инноваций и аэрокосмической промышленности (Russian)		Jaslan Mädiev	6 May 2024	29 September 2025
Ministry of Artificial Intelligence and Digital Development; Жасанды интеллект және цифрлық даму министрі (Kazakh); Министр искусственного интеллекта и цифрового развития (Russian)		Jaslan Mädiev	29 September 2025	28 August 2026
Ministry of Ecology and Natural Resources; Экология және табиғи ресурстар министрі (Kazakh); Министр экологии и природных ресурсов (Russian)		Erlan Nysanbaev	6 February 2024	28 August 2026
Minister of Energy; Энергетика министрі (Kazakh); Министр энергетики (Russian)		Almasadam Sätqaliev	6 February 2024	18 March 2025
Minister of Energy; Энергетика министрі (Kazakh); Министр энергетики (Russian)		Erlan Aqkenjenov	19 March 2025	28 August 2026
