= Second Bektenov Government =

20th government of Kazakhstan

- 20th Cabinet of Kazakhstan
- 31 August 2026
- A cabinet meeting of the Second Bektenov Government, September 2026
- Date formed: 31 August 2026

People and organisations
- Head of state: Kassym-Jomart Tokayev
- Head of government: Oljas Bektenov
- Member party: Ädilet; Independent
- Status in legislature: Supermajority
- Opposition parties: Auyl; Aq Jol; JSDP; Respublica

History
- Election: 2026
- Legislature term: 2026–
- Predecessor: Bektenov I

Murat Muhanov takes the oath office of Minister of Emergency Situations, September 2026

The Second Bektenov Government (Kazakh: Екінші Бектенов үкіметі; Russian: Второе правительство Бектенова) is the 20th government of Kazakhstan led by Prime Minister Oljas Bektenov. It was formed on 31 August 2026 following the resignation of the First Bektenov Government after the 2026 legislative election and the convening of the newly established Kurultai. President Kassym-Jomart Tokayev nominated Bektenov for reappointment as prime minister of Kazakhstan, and the Kurultai approved his candidacy. Tokayev subsequently reappointed Bektenov as prime minister and appointed the new government.

== Background ==
The formation of the Second Bektenov Government followed the constitutional reforms adopted in Kazakhstan in 2026, which replaced the previous bicameral Parliament with the unicameral Kurultai and introduced a new system of state institutions. The new constitution entered into force on 1 July 2026, after which President Kassym-Jomart Tokayev called elections to the Kurultai. The elections were held on 23 August, with 145 deputies elected by party-list proportional representation. The newly elected Kurultai convened for its first session on 28 August and elected Aibek Dädebai as its chairman. The constitutional transition and formation of the new legislature required the government to resign before a new government could be formed under the new institutional framework.

=== Formation ===
On 28 August 2026, the Bektenov Government, which had been in office since February 2024, resigned ahead of the first session of the newly elected 1st Kurultai. Prime Minister Oljas Bektenov and the other members of the government continued to exercise their duties until the formation of a new government. The resignation was part of the transition to the new constitutional system rather than the result of a parliamentary vote of no confidence or a change of prime minister.

==== Parliamentary vote ====
On 31 August, President Kassym-Jomart Tokayev nominated Bektenov for reappointment as prime minister of Kazakhstan. The Kurultai approved his candidacy by a vote of 137–0, with seven abstentions, following which Tokayev formally reappointed Bektenov as prime minister and formed the Second Bektenov Government.

Kurultai confirmation, 31 August 2026
For		Against		Abstained		Did not vote	
137	94.5%	0	0.0%	7	4.8%	1	0.7%
Source: Zakon.kz

== Composition ==
Portfolio	Image	Holder	Term of office	
Portfolio	Image	Holder	Start	End
Head of government
Prime Minister; Премьер-Министр		Oljas Bektenov	6 February 2024	Present
Deputy Prime Ministers
First Deputy Prime Minister; Премьер-министрдің бірінші орынбасары (Kazakh); Первый заместитель Премьер-Министра (Russian)		Nurlybek Nalibaev	6 May 2026	Present
Deputy Prime Minister – Chief of Staff of the Government; Премьер-Министрдің орынбасары – Үкімет Аппаратының басшысы (Kazakh); Заместитель Премьер-Министра – Руководитель Аппарата Правительства (Russian)		Galymjan Koishibaev	4 January 2023	Present
Deputy Prime Minister – Minister of Artificial Intelligence and Digital Development; Премьер-Министрдің орынбасары – жасанды интеллект және цифрлық даму министрі (Kazakh); Заместитель Премьер-Министра – министр искусственного интеллекта и цифрового развития (Russian)		Jaslan Mädiev	29 September 2025	Present
Deputy Prime Minister – Minister of National Economy; Премьер-Министрдің орынбасары – ұлттық экономика министрі (Kazakh); Заместитель Премьер-Министра – министр национальной экономики (Russian)		Serik Jumanğarin	21 December 2024	Present
Deputy Prime Minister; Премьер-Министрдің орынбасары (Kazakh); Заместитель Премьер-Министра (Russian)		Kanat Bozumbayev	31 March 2024	Present
Deputy Prime Minister – Minister of Transport; Премьер-Министрдің орынбасары – көлік министрі (Kazakh); Заместитель Премьер-Министра – министр транспорта (Russian)		Assel Janassova	3 November 2026	Present
Government ministers
Minister of Defence; Қорғаныс министрі (Kazakh); Министр обороны (Russian)		Däuren Qosanov	8 June 2025	27 September 2026
Minister of Defence; Қорғаныс министрі (Kazakh); Министр обороны (Russian)		Aidos Myrzahmetov	27 September 2026	Present
Minister of Foreign Affairs; Сыртқы істер министрі (Kazakh); Министр иностранных дел (Russian)		Mukhtar Tleuberdi	2 September 2026	Present
Minister of Internal Affairs; Ішкі істер министрі (Kazakh); Министр внутренних дел (Russian)		Erjan Sädenov	2 September 2023	Present
Minister of Agriculture; Ауыл шаруашылығы министрі (Kazakh); Министр сельского хозяйства (Russian)		Aidarbek Saparov	4 September 2023	Present
Minister of Justice; Әділет министрі (Kazakh); Министр юстиции (Russian)		Erlan Särsembaev	9 January 2025	Present
Minister of Education; Оқу-ағарту министрі (Kazakh); Министр просвещения (Russian)		Juldyz Süleimenova	29 September 2025	Present
Minister of Science and Higher Education; Ғылым және жоғары білім министрі (Kazakh); Министр науки и высшего образования (Russian)		Saiasat Nurbek	11 June 2022	Present
Minister of Healthcare; Денсаулық сақтау министрі (Kazakh); Министр здравоохранения (Russian)		Akmaral Alnazarova	6 February 2024	Present
Minister of Labour and Social Protection of the Population; Еңбек және халықты әлеуметтік қорғау министрі (Kazakh); Министр труда и социальной защиты населения (Russian)		Asqarbek Ertaev	27 January 2026	Present
Minister of Transport; Көлік министрі (Kazakh); Министр транспорта (Russian)		Nurlan Sauranbaev	30 June 2025	3 November 2026
Minister of Transport; Көлік министрі (Kazakh); Министр транспорта (Russian)		Assel Janassova	3 November 2026	Present
Minister of Finance; Қаржы министрі (Kazakh); Министр финансов (Russian)		Mädi Takiev	6 February 2024	Present
Minister of Culture and Information; Мәдениет және ақпарат министрі (Kazakh); Министр культуры и информации (Russian)		Arman Qyryqbaev	3 September 2026	Present
Minister of Trade and Integration; Сауда және интеграция министрі (Kazakh); Министр торговли и интеграции (Russian)		Arman Şaqqaliev	2 September 2023	Present
Minister of Industry and Construction; Өнеркәсіп және құрылыс министрі (Kazakh); Министр промышленности и инфраструктурного развития (Russian)		Ersaiyn Nağaspaev	28 February 2025	Present
Ministry of Water Resources and Irrigation; Су ресурстары және ирригация министрі (Kazakh); Министр водных ресурсов и ирригации (Russian)		Nurjan Nurjıgıtov	4 September 2023	Present
Minister of Emergency Situations; Төтенше жағдайлар министрі (Kazakh); Министр по чрезвычайным ситуациям (Russian)		Şyñğys Ärinov; Acting	31 August 2026	3 September 2026
Minister of Emergency Situations; Төтенше жағдайлар министрі (Kazakh); Министр по чрезвычайным ситуациям (Russian)		Murat Muhanov	3 September 2026	Present
Minister of Tourism and Sports; Туризм және спорт министрі (Kazakh); Министр туризма и спорта (Russian)		Erbol Myrzabosynov	2 September 2024	Present
Ministry of Artificial Intelligence and Digital Development; Жасанды интеллект және цифрлық даму министрі (Kazakh); Министр искусственного интеллекта и цифрового развития (Russian)		Jaslan Mädiev	29 September 2025	Present
Ministry of Ecology and Natural Resources; Экология және табиғи ресурстар министрі (Kazakh); Министр экологии и природных ресурсов (Russian)		Erlan Nysanbaev; Acting	31 August 2026	3 September 2026
Ministry of Ecology and Natural Resources; Экология және табиғи ресурстар министрі (Kazakh); Министр экологии и природных ресурсов (Russian)		Älibek Quantyrov	3 September 2026	Present
Minister of Energy; Энергетика министрі (Kazakh); Министр энергетики (Russian)		Erlan Aqkenjenov	19 March 2025	Present
