= National Olympic Committee of the Republic of Kazakhstan =

National Olympic Committee

- Country/Region: Kazakhstan
- Code: KAZ
- Created: 1990
- Recognized: 1993
- Continental Association: OCA
- Headquarters: Astana, Kazakhstan
- President: Gennady Golovkin
- Secretary General: Alimzhan Akayev
- Website: olympic.kz

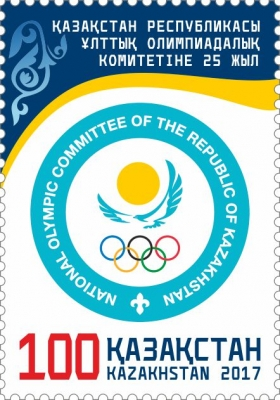
A 2017 stamp commemorating the 25 year anniversary of the National Olympic Committee of Kazakhstan

The National Olympic Committee of the Republic of Kazakhstan (Kazakh: Қазақстан Республикасы Ұлттық Олимпиадалық комитеті, Qazaqstan Respublikasy Ūlttyq Olimpiadalyq komitetı; Russian: Национальный олимпийский комитет Республики Казахстан; IOC code: KAZ) is the National Olympic Committee representing Kazakhstan. It is a member of the Olympic Council of Asia.

== List of presidents ==
President	Term
Timur Dosymbetov	1990–1993
Amanca Seisenovich Akpaev	1993–2002
Timur Dosymbetov	2002–2006
Temirkhan Dosmukhanbetov	2006–2015
Timur Kulibayev	2015–2024
Gennady Golovkin	2024–present

== Member federations ==
The Kazakhstan National Federations are the organizations that coordinate all aspects of their individual sports. They are responsible for training, competition and development of their sports. There are currently 29 Olympic Summer and 6 Winter Sport Federations in Kazakhstan.

National Federation	Summer or Winter	Headquarters
Kazakhstan Archery Federation	Summer	Almaty
Kazakhstan Athletics Federation	Summer	Astana
Kazakhstan Badminton Federation	Summer	Astana
Basketball Federation of the Republic of Kazakhstan	Summer	Astana
Kazakhstan Biathlon Union	Winter	Astana
Kazakhstan Boxing Federation	Summer	Astana
Kazakhstan Canoe Federation	Summer	Almaty
Kazakhstan Curling Association	Winter	Almaty
Kazakhstan Cycling Federation	Summer	Astana
Kazakhstan Equestrian Federation	Summer	Astana
Fencing Federation of Kazakhstan	Summer	Almaty
Kazakhstan Football Federation	Summer	Astana
Kazakhstan Golf Federation	Summer	Almaty
Kazakhstan Gymnastics Federation	Summer	Almaty
Kazakhstan Handball Federation	Summer	Almaty
Kazakhstan Hockey Federation	Summer	Almaty
Kazakhstan Ice Hockey Federation	Winter	Astana
Kazakhstan Judo Federation	Summer	Astana
Kazakhstan Karate-do Federation	Summer	Almaty
Luge Federation of Kazakhstan	Winter	Almaty
Modern Pentathlon Federation of Kazakhstan	Summer	Astana
Mountaineering and Sport Climbing Federation of Kazakhstan	Winter	Almaty
Kazakhstan Rugby Federation	Summer	Almaty
Kazakhstan Sailing Federation	Summer	Kapchagay
Kazakhstan Skating Federation	Winter	Almaty
Ski Federation of Kazakhstan	Winter	Astana
Swimming Federation of Kazakhstan	Summer	Almaty
Table Tennis Federation of Kazakhstan	Summer	Almaty
Kazakhstan Taekwondo Federation	Summer	Astana
Kazakhstan Tennis Federation	Summer	Astana
Kazakhstan Trap and Practical Shooting Federation	Summer	Almaty
Kazakhstan Triathlon Federation	Summer	Astana
Volleyball Federation of the Republic of Kazakhstan	Summer	Almaty
Weightlifting Federation of the Republic of Kazakhstan	Summer	Astana
Kazakhstan Wrestling Federation	Summer	Astana

== See also ==
- Kazakhstan at the Olympics
