= Askar Zhumagaliyev =

Kazakh politician (born 1972)

Asqar Jūmağaliev
- Асқар Жұмағалиев
- Jūmağaliev in 2019

Deputy Prime Minister of Kazakhstan
- In office 29 August 2017 – 25 February 2019
- Prime Minister: Bakhytzhan Sagintayev; Askar Mamin (Acting)

Minister of Digital Development, Innovation and Aerospace Industry
- In office 26 December 2018 – 20 July 2020
- President: Nursultan Nazarbayev
- Prime Minister: Bakhytzhan Sagintayev; Askar Mamin
- Preceded by: Beibut Atamkulov (Defense and Aerospace Industry)
- Succeeded by: Bağdat Musin

Minister of Transport and Communications
- In office 21 January 2012 – 7 March 2014
- President: Nursultan Nazarbayev
- Prime Minister: Serik Akhmetov; Karim Massimov
- Preceded by: Berik Kamaliev
- Succeeded by: Zhenis Kassymbek

Minister of Communications and Information
- In office 12 March 2010 – 20 January 2012
- President: Nursultan Nazarbayev
- Prime Minister: Karim Massimov
- Preceded by: Altynbek Sarsenbayuly (Information)
- Succeeded by: Office abolished

Personal details
- Born: 2 August 1978 (age 48) Orenburg Oblast, Russian SFSR, Soviet Union
- Spouse: Ainur Kairatkyzy Mami
- Children: 2
- Education: Suvorov Military School; Satbayev University

Asqar Quanyşūly Jūmağaliev (Note: Often transliterated as Askar Kuanyshevich Zhumagaliev through a Russified Romanization of Аскар Куанышевич Жумагалиев.) (Kazakh: Асқар Қуанышұлы Жұмағалиев; born 2 August 1972) is a Kazakh politician. He was the Deputy Prime Minister of the Republic of Kazakhstan from 29 August 2017 until the government was dismissed on 25 February 2019. Jūmağaliev was the Deputy Minister for Investment and Development of Kazakhstan, chief executive officer of Kazatomprom, Kazakhstan's uranium mining company.

== Education ==
Jūmağaliev was born in 1972 in the Orenburg region of the Russian Soviet Federative Socialist Republic. He attended and graduated from the Sverdlovsk Suvorov Military School before majoring in Radio Communication, Broadcasting and Television at Satbayev Kazakh National Technical University. Subsequently, he received a second degree, in law, from the Kazakh Humanitarian Law University before graduating with a master's degree in electronic management from École Polytechnique Fédérale de Lausanne.

== Career ==
- Deputy Prime Minister of the Republic of Kazakhstan, Aug 2017 – Feb 2019
- CEO NAC Kazatomprom JSC, May 2015 – Present. Manages the activity of "NAC" Kazatomprom " JSC, headed by the Company's Management Board, form the strategy of development, defines the Company's prospects and directions of international cooperation, personnel policy.
- Chairman of the Agency Republic of Kazakhstan for Communications and Information, Mar 2014 – Aug 2014
- Minister of Transport and Communications of the Republic of Kazakhstan, Jan 2012 – Mar 2014
- Minister of Communications and Information of the Republic of Kazakhstan, Mar 2010 – Jan 2012
- President of JSC Kazakhtelecom, Oct 2006 – Mar 2010
