= Kuanyshbek Yessekeev =

Kazakhstani politician and businessman

Quanyşbek Essekeev
- Қуанышбек Есекеев
- Essekeev in 2024

Assistant to the president of Kazakhstan
- Incumbent
- Assumed office 9 September 2025
- President: Kassym-Jomart Tokayev

CEO of Kazakhtelecom
- In office 16 March 2010 – 10 June 2024
- President: Nursultan Nazarbayev; Kassym-Jomart Tokayev
- Preceded by: Asqar Jūmağaliev
- Succeeded by: Bağdat Musin

Chairman of the Agency for Informatization and Communications
- In office 9 October 2006 – 16 March 2010
- Preceded by: Asqar Jūmağaliev
- Succeeded by: Asqar Jūmağaliev (Minister of Communications and Information)

Personal details
- Born: 10 June 1975 (age 51) Almaty, Kazakh SSR, Soviet Union
- Spouse: Madina Bekturğanova
- Children: 3
- Education: Al-Farabi Kazakh National University; Kazakh State Economic University; Hult International Business School
- Awards: Order of Parasat; Order of Kurmet

Quanyşbek Baqytbekūly Essekeev (Note: Often transliterated as Kuanyshbek Bakytbekovich Yessekeyev through a Russified Romanization of Куанышбек Бакытбекович Есекеев.) (Note: Kazakh: Қуанышбек Бақытбекұлы Есекеев) (born 10 June 1975) is a Kazakh manager and politician serving as the assistant to the president of Kassym-Jomart Tokayev since 2025. Previously, he was a CEO of Kazakhtelecom from 2010 to 2024.

From January 25, 2019 to March 24, 2022, he was a member of the Board of Directors of Kcell JSC.

== Early life ==
In 1995, he graduated from Al-Farabi Kazakh National University, majoring in applied mathematics. During his student years, he already wrote a dissertation paper. At the age of 22 after graduation he attained the status of candidate of sciences in physics and mathematics. His topic of dissertation was "Dynamic problems solvability of impure liquids." After this he became youngest scientist in the Republic of Kazakhstan, the record is still unbeaten. Additionally, he received second bachelor's degree in finance and credit in Narxoz University.

He can speak Kazakh, Russian and English.

== Career ==
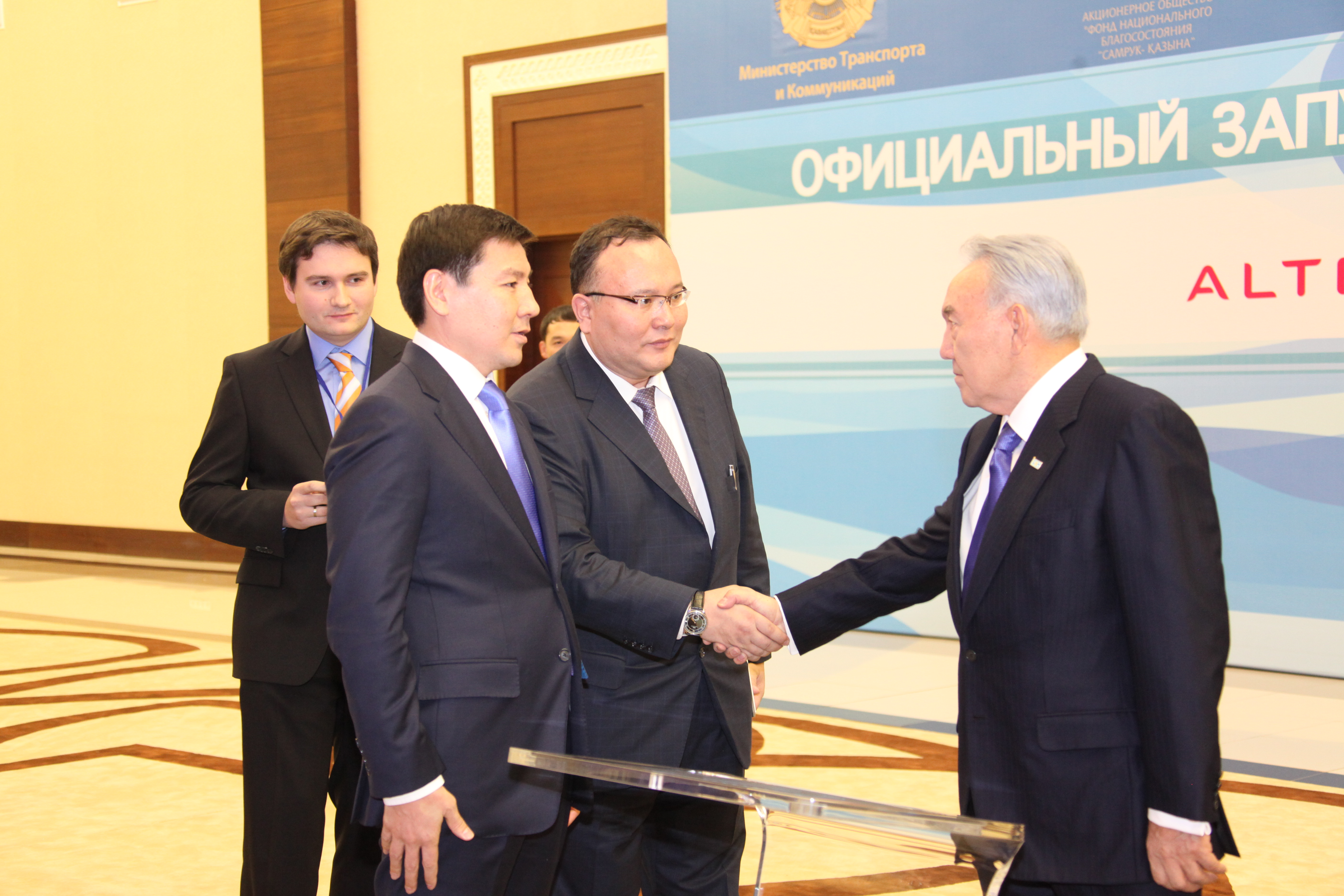
Official launching of 4G in Kazakhstan. Nursultan Nazarbayev, Kuanyshbek Yessekeev, Askar Zhumagaliyev

Between 1998 and 2002, he was head of the IT department in Kazakhoil, Kazakhstan Temir Zholy. In 2002, he worked in government affairs as Director of Department at Ministry of Finance, Economics and Budget Planning in the Republic of Kazakhstan and advised on informatization. On 13 May 2004, Kuanyshbek Yessekeev was appointed as Deputy of Chairman in Kazakhstan Agency of Information and Communication. Starting from February 2007 until March 2010 lead KAIC as Chairman. In November 2008 entered the board of directors for National Info-Communication holding company Zerde. In AIC he built Online Government of Republic of Kazakhstan, freed range of 3G networks for mobile operators. Starting on 15 March 2010, he worked as Chairman of Kazakhtelecom. Where he introduced network standards for 4G (through subsidiary company Altel), developed cloud services, digital television, and IP telecommunications, also prepared company before listing in London Stock Exchange. Position of Yesekeev's term as Chairman in Kazakhtelecom was extended for three years from 15 March 2016 - according to the decision of Board of Directors of Kazakhtelecom (Protocol from 05.02.2016 #1).

On January 25, 2019, Esekeyev Kuanyshbek Bakhytbekovich joined the new board of directors of Kcell JSC.

On March 16, 2022, by the decision of the Board of Directors of Kazakhtelecom JSC, Kuanyshbek Yesekeyev was elected to the position of Chairman of the Board.

May 24, 2022 - Kuanyshbek Yessekeyev was prematurely removed from the Board of Directors of Kcell JSC.

May 24, 2022 - headed the Supervisory Board of Mobile Telecom-Service.

On December 2, 2022 , he was elected President of the Judo Federation of Kazakhstan.
