= KJF =

KJF may refer to:

- Kazakhstan Judo Federation, the governing body for the sport of judo in Kazakhstan
- Koktebel Jazz Festival, a Ukrainian jazz and world music festival
