= Bağdat Musin =

Kazakh politician (born 1983)

Bagdat Musin
- Бағдат Мусин
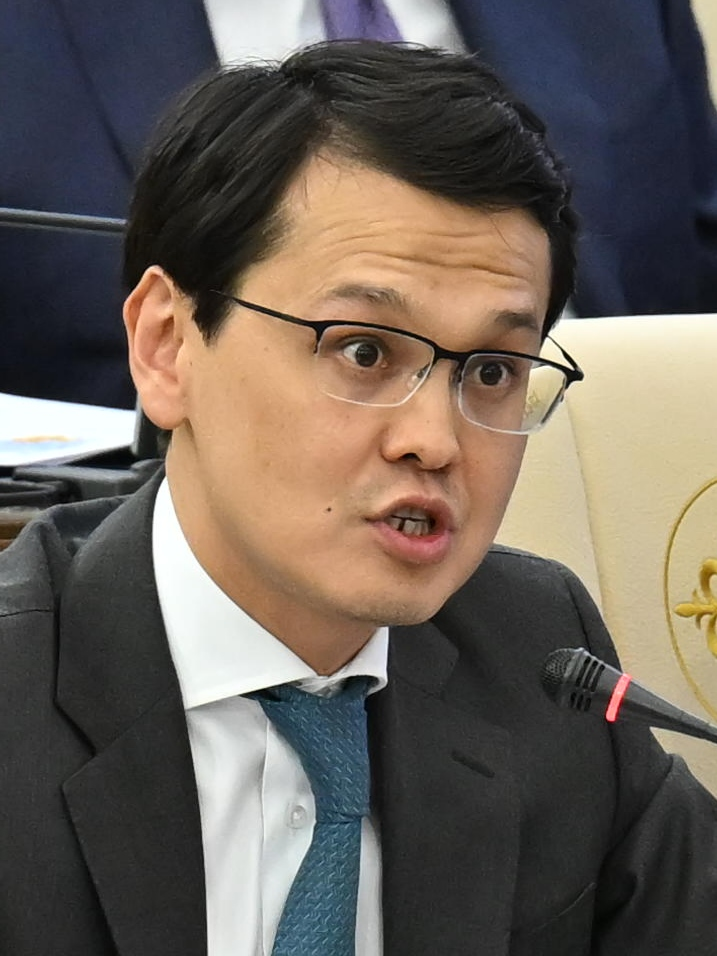
- Musin in 2023

CEO of Kazakhtelecom
- Incumbent
- Assumed office 10 June 2024
- Preceded by: Kuanyshbek Yessekeev

Minister of Digital Development, Innovation and Aerospace Industry of Kazakhstan
- In office 2 September 2020 – 30 April 2024; Acting: 20 July – 2 September 2020
- President: Kassym-Jomart Tokayev
- Prime Minister: Asqar Mamin; Älihan Smaiylov; Roman Sklyar (acting); Oljas Bektenov
- Preceded by: Askar Zhumagaliyev
- Succeeded by: Jaslan Mädiev

Personal details
- Born: 3 March 1983 (age 43) Ekibastuz, Kazakh SSR, Soviet Union
- Children: 3
- Education: Suleyman Demirel University; Kazakh Institute of Jurisprudence and International Relations
- Occupation: Politician; computer scientist; software engineer; manager

Bağdat Batyrbekūly Musin (Kazakh: Бағдат Батырбекұлы Мусин; born 3 March 1983) is a Kazakh politician who has been CEO of Kazakhtelecom since 2024. Previously, he was Minister of Digital Development, Innovation and Aerospace Industry from 2020 to 2024.

Musin is best known for his tenure as Minister of Digital Development, Innovation and Aerospace Industry of Kazakhstan from September 2020 to April 2024 and his controversial remarks during these years, such as claiming that the internet speed of Astana overtook that of Tokyo. Residents of both the capital and Almaty have also complained about the low internet quality that came with the tenure of Musin as minister.

== Biography ==
=== Early life and education ===
Musin was born in the town of Ekibastuz. In 2004, he graduated from the Suleyman Demirel University in Kaskelen with a degree in computer science and software. From there, Musin attended the Kazakh Ablai Khan University of International Relations and World Languages, from which he graduated two years later with a degree in law.

=== Early career ===
From 2004 to 2007, Musin was the chief software engineer, then deputy director of the IT department at National Information Technologies JSC. From 2007 to 2011, he held various positions in the Ministry of Justice, such as head of its information technology department.

In 2011, he became the deputy chairman of the Committee for Automation of Public Services and Coordination in the Ministry of Communications and Information, later becoming the chairman in 2012.

From April to August 2014, Musin was the chairman of JSC National Information Technologies. He then became the chairman of the Board of Kazpost. During this period, under Musin's leadership, the process of modernization of the enterprise began. One of the most important innovations was the introduction of automation for issuing pensions and benefits. Also during this period, the company launched a global tracking system for postal items, opened a network of parcel terminals and the first parcel supermarket in Kazakhstan.

From 2017 to 2018, Musin was the chairman of the Committee on Legal Statistics and Special Accounting of the Prosecutor General's Office of Kazakhstan.

In March 2020, he was appointed as an adviser to the President of Kazakhstan on Digitalization and Innovative Technologies.

On January 12, 2023, he headed the Sports Programming Federation.

On June 10, 2024, by the decision of the Board of Directors of Kazakhtelecom, Bagdat Musin was elected to the position of Chairman of the Board.

=== Political career ===
From 20 July 2020, Musin temporarily served as a First Vice and Acting Minister of Digital Development, Innovation and Aerospace Industry after his predecessor Askar Zhumagaliyev was relieved from his post. Musin was a Minister of Digital Development, Innovation and Aerospace Industry from September 2020 until April 2024.

== Criticism and controversies ==
=== Tokyo internet comment ===
Musin's tenure as Minister of Digital Development, Innovation and Aerospace Industry may be most memorable for his different viral comments, notably his claim that the internet speed in Astana exceeded that of Tokyo and 35 other cities. This claim was criticised for being misleading disinformation and was easily disproven by journalist Nazymgül Kümisbaeva.

=== Internet connection problems ===
Aside from personal controversies, Musin's ministry was criticised for being largely ineffective. Residents complained about the decreasing internet connection quality in the country. In June 2024, Musin blamed the Kazakhstanis themselves, claiming that the problems stemmed from all the radiophobes in the country and internet service providers' cheap prices and advised citizens to "use the Internet sparingly, like water".

=== Connection issues during online broadcast ===
On April 23, 2023, viewers encountered errors during a YouTube live broadcast by the digital development ministry. The problem occurred just as Musin spoke about improving the internet, making his speech unintelligible. The irony of the situation later resulted in an internet meme and went viral, which was acknowledged by Musin himself. The Ministry, however, blamed not the organizers, but the app itself.

=== Kazakhtelecom comment ===
During his ministry, Musin claimed that many of the connection-related problems in the country came from internet service providers and not the ministry. Notably, he said that he would have "solved all the problems of Kazakhtelecom in a day" if he was allowed to do so. Later, the same day that Musin was appointed the chairman of the company, journalist Ashat Niyazov mocked the comment, joking that "now, tomorrow, we should be expecting high-speed Internet connection with no errors".

== Personal life ==
Musin is married and has two daughters and a son. He was awarded with such medals as "Eren enbegi ushin" and "20 years of independence of the Republic of Kazakhstan". Musin speaks Kazakh, Russian, English and Turkish.
