= Altynbek Sarsenbayuly =

Kazakh politician (1962-2006)

- Алтынбек Сәрсенбайұлы
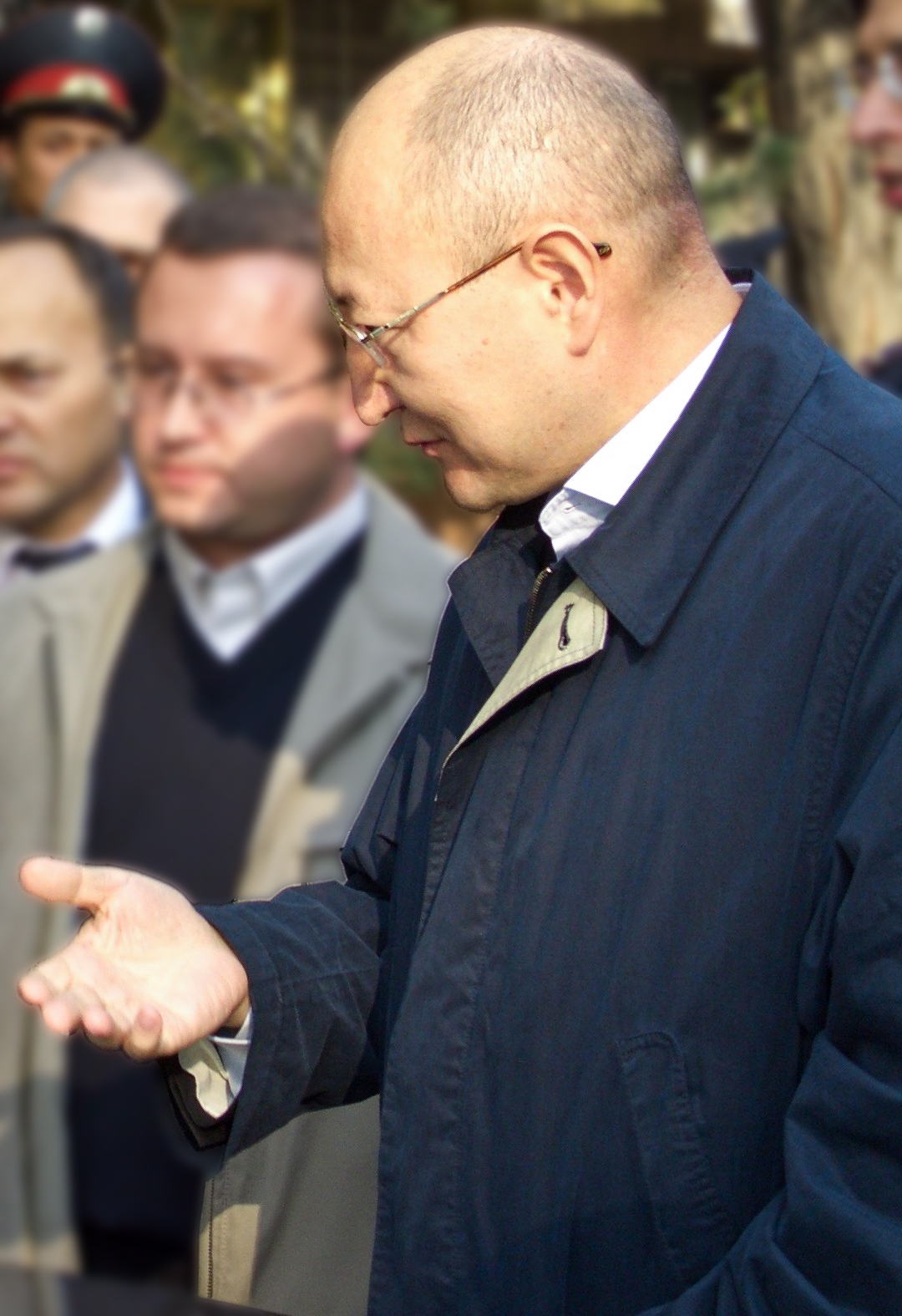
- Altynbek in 2005

Secretary of the Security Council
- In office 5 May 2001 – 11 December 2001
- Chairman: Nursultan Nazarbayev
- President: Nursultan Nazarbayev
- Preceded by: Marat Tazhin
- Succeeded by: Marat Tazhin

Minister of Information
- In office 12 July 2004 – 29 September 2004
- President: Nursultan Nazarbayev
- Prime Minister: Daniyal Akhmetov
- Preceded by: Sauytbek Adrahmanov
- Succeeded by: Esetjan Kosubaev (Culture, Information and Sports)

Minister of Culture, Information and Public Accord
- In office 13 October 1997 – 5 May 2001
- President: Nursultan Nazarbayev
- Prime Minister: Nurlan Balgimbayev; Kassym-Jomart Tokayev
- Preceded by: Office established
- Succeeded by: Mukhtar Kul-Mukhammed

Minister of Press and Media
- In office 20 January 1993 – 14 October 1995
- President: Nursultan Nazarbayev
- Prime Minister: Sergey Tereshchenko; Akezhan Kazhegeldin
- Preceded by: Quanysh Sultanov
- Succeeded by: Office abolished

Ambassador of Kazakhstan to Russia
- In office 25 January 2002 – 3 November 2003
- President: Nursultan Nazarbayev
- Preceded by: Taiyr Mansurov
- Succeeded by: Krymbek Kusherbayev

Personal details
- Born: Altynbek Sarsenbayevich Sarsenbayev; 12 September 1962 Qainar, Kazakh SSR, Soviet Union
- Died: 11 February 2006 (aged 43) Talgar District, Kazakhstan
- Party: Nağyz Aq Jol (2005–2006)
- Other political affiliations: Democratic Party (1995–1999); Otan (1999–2003); Aq Jol (2003–2005)
- Children: 2
- Education: Al-Farabi Kazakh National University; Moscow State University

Altynbek Särsenbaiūly (Kazakh: Алтынбек Сәрсенбайұлы; 12 September 1962 – 11 February 2006) was a Kazakh politician who served in the Government of Kazakhstan before becoming a political opposition leader. At the time of his death, he served as the co-chairman of Nağyz Aq Jol.

In 2003, after a long career in senior government positions of Kazakhstan, such as Information Minister and Ambassador to Russia, Altynbek joined the opposition ranks in protest against what he regarded as the administration's authoritarian policies.

Soon after his decision to contest in the 2005 Kazakh presidential election, Altynbek faced government intimidation tactics, including a physical assault by unidentified individuals during a presidential campaign meeting with voters and the alleged beating of his two nephews in November 2005.

== Biography ==
=== Early life and education ===
Altynbek was born in the village of Qainar in family of 12 children. In 1982, he graduated from the Faculty of Journalism of the Al-Farabi Kazakh National University and then in 1985 from the Moscow State University.

=== Career ===
From 1985, he was an editor and senior editor of KazTAG. In 1987, Altynbek became an editor and executive secretary of the Arai - Zarya magazine. From 1989 to 1992, he was an editor of the Orken - Horizon newspaper.

In March 1992, Altynbek was appointed as the head of the Department of Culture and Interethnic Relations of the President. From August 1992, he served as the head of the Department of Internal Policy of the President.

On 20 January 1993, Altynbek was appointed as Minister of Press and Media. While serving the post, he founded the Democratic Party of Kazakhstan on 1 July 1995 and was its co-chairman until it was merged with Otan on 1 March 1999. On 14 October 1995, the Ministry was reorganized into National Agency for Press and Mass Media of the Republic of Kazakhstan in 14 October 1995 where Altynbek served its chairman.

On 13 October 1997, Altynbek became the Minister of Information and Public Accord. On 22 January 1999, after the Ministry was merged, he was appointed as the Minister of Culture, Information and Public Accord until becoming the secretary of the Security Council of Kazakhstan on 5 May 2001. On 25 January 2002, Altynbek was appointed as an Ambassador of Kazakhstan to Russia until being relieved from his post on 3 November 2003.

In December 2003, Altynbek became the co-chair of the Ak Zhol Democratic Party. From 12 July to 29 September 2004, he was the Minister of Information before resigning from the post after accusing of the government rigging the 2004 legislative elections. After Ak Zhol was split on 19 April 2005, Altynbek was the organizer and co-chairman of the unregistered Naghyz Ak Zhol party.

== Death ==
On 13 February 2006 the bodies of Altynbek, his bodyguard and his driver were found dead on a road near the city of Almaty, reportedly lying face-down, hands tied on their back, and shot in the head at point blank range.

=== Investigation ===
On 22 February 2006 five officers of Kazakhstan's KNB security service, and specifically the elite Arystan combat division, were arrested for involvement in Altynbek's murder. According to Interior Minister Bauyrzhan Mukhamedzhanov the five men were paid $25,000 for committing the murder. Nartay Dutbayev, the chief national security officer in the government, resigned on 23 February, the day after his subordinates were arrested.

Police arrested Rustam Ibragimov, a former law enforcement officer, as a suspect for organizing the operation. Four more men were later arrested in connection with the assassination.

On 31 August 2006, all ten of the accused assassins were convicted of the murder of Altynbek. Rustam Ibragimov was sentenced to death, while his nine accomplices received prison terms ranging from 3–20 years. Ibragimov's death sentence was commuted to life in prison in 2014.

The completion of the investigation in December 2013 was marked by a press conference with the Deputy Prosecutor General of Kazakhstan and the ranking American diplomat in Kazakhstan, Ambassador John Ordway.

Ordway praised the "exceptional cooperation" between Kazakh law enforcement and the American Federal Bureau of Investigation, and that the FBI's results were consistent with the findings of the Kazakhstani Procurator General. Ordway emphasized that the FBI's investigation was independent from the Procurator General's office, and the FBI had full and immediate access all materials and information.
