= ForteBank =

Kazakhstan private bank

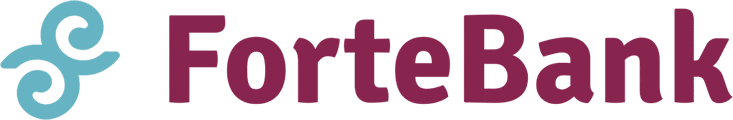

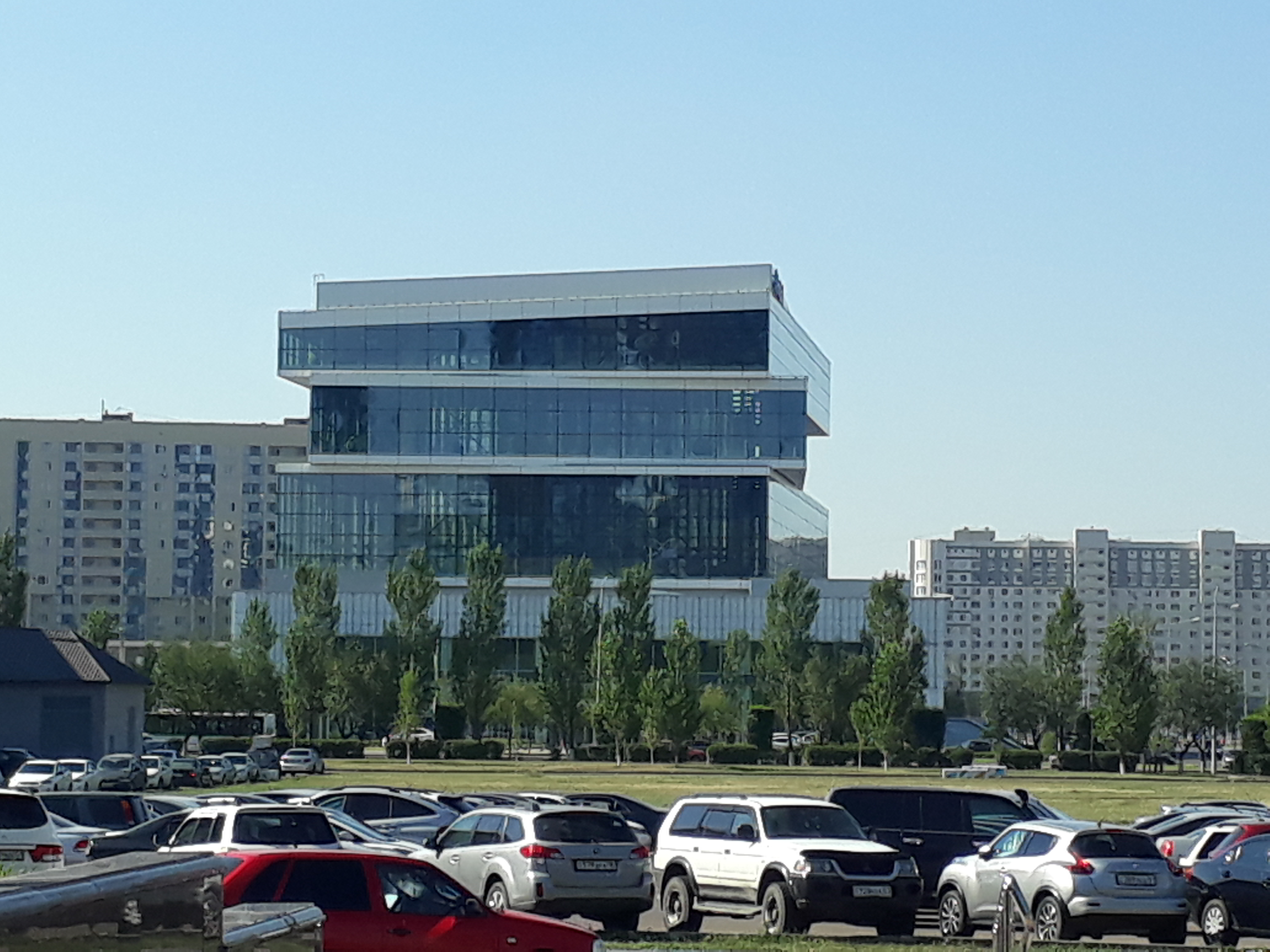
- The headquarters of ForteBank in Astana
- Industry: Financial services
- Predecessors: ForteBank; Alliance Bank; Temirbank
- Founded: February 10, 2015; 11 years ago
- Headquarters: Astana, Kazakhstan
- Key people: Bulat Utemuratov, Owner Bekzhan Piramatov, CEO
- Website: forte.kz

ForteBank is a Kazakh private bank. The head office is located in the capital Astana, with branches located throughout Kazakhstan.

As of January 2023, ForteBank ranks fifth in terms of assets among Kazakh banks.

== History ==
The current bank was created on February 10, 2015, as a result of the merger of three banks - ForteBank, Alliance Bank and Temirbank. The main shareholder of the bank is Kazakh businessman Bulat Utemuratov.

=== 2015 ===
- ForteBank was established through the merger of ForteBank, Alliance Bank, and Temirbank.

=== 2016 ===
- In October, the ForteBank Kulanshi Art Space gallery was opened in collaboration with the Kulanshi Center for Contemporary Art.
- In November, an agreement was signed with the European Bank for Reconstruction and Development to provide a loan of 60 million US dollars for lending to micro, small and medium-sized business projects and to finance women's entrepreneurship under the EBRD's Women in Business program.

=== 2017 ===
May marked the bank's first payment of dividends on its common shares. The total amount of accrued dividends amounted to 4.6 billion tenge.

=== 2018 ===
- In February, Guram Andronikashvili, who previously held the position of First Deputy Chairman of the Board of the bank, was appointed Chairman of the Board of the bank.
- In September, the bank issued 220 billion tenge of coupon bonds, with a rate of 4% and a term of circulation until 2024.
- In December, the bank acquired Kassa Nova Bank.

=== 2019 ===
- In March, the bank became a participant in a program for supporting projects for financing small and medium-sized enterprises through the Asian Development Bank.

=== 2020 ===
- In May, the bank launched ForteMobile in collaboration with Beeline.
- In May, the bank also launched the ForteForex platform for currency trading.
- In August, ForteBank sold Kassa Nova Bank to Freedom Finance.

=== 2021 ===
- In June, the bank launched a new generation of payment cards with enhanced digital capabilities.
- In September, the bank launched a new mobile application for legal entities, the “Forte Business App”, with functions such as of remote registration and opening accounts.

=== 2022 ===
- In January, ForteBank was the first bank to be accredited by the Center for Information Security of the Ministry of Digital Development, Innovation and Aerospace Industry of the Republic of Kazakhstan.

=== 2023 ===
- In March S&P Global Ratings rated ForteBank at the BB-/B level.
- In April, Fitch rated ForteBank at the BB level.
- In September, ForteBank joined the KazakhExport trade program.
- In November, Moody's rated ForteBank at the Ва2 level.
- Also in November, ForteBank and MasterCard launched the "Alem" service for international transfers to an account or card.
- In December, an Executive MBA program was started for ForteBank leaders, in collaboration with Narxoz University.

== Business model ==
ForteBank is a universal bank operating in all market segments (retail, SME, corporate).

Inside the bank there is a division into brands:

- ForteBank — a bank for individuals, offering customers debit cards, credit cards, loans, and deposits.
- ForteBusiness —a bank for legal entities, offering customers corporate cards, accounts, loans, and deposits.
- ForteMarket — a marketplace through which Kazakh stores can sell their goods.
- ForteMobile — mobile services in collaboration with the telecommunications company Beeline.
- ForteForex — a currency trading platform.

== Links ==
- Official website
