= Nurjan Nurjıgıtov =

Kazakh politician

- Нұржан Нұржігітов
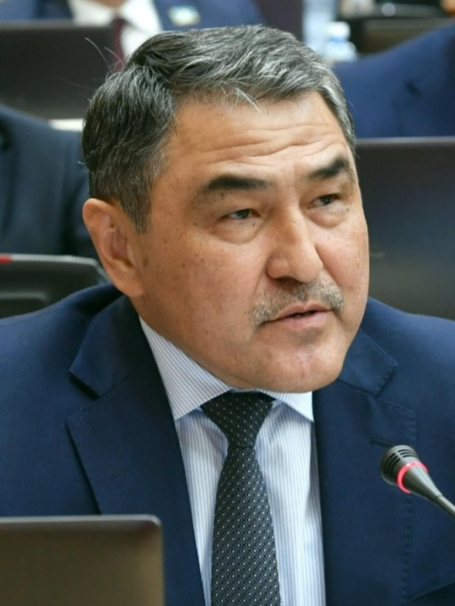
- Nurjıgıtov in 2024

Minister of Water Resources and Irrigation
- Incumbent
- Assumed office 4 September 2023
- President: Kassym-Jomart Tokayev
- Prime Minister: Älihan Smaiylov; Roman Sklyar (acting); Oljas Bektenov
- Preceded by: Zülfia Süleimenova

Akim of Jambyl Region
- In office 7 April 2022 – 4 September 2023
- Preceded by: Berdibek Saparbayev
- Succeeded by: Erbol Qaraşökeev

Akim of Bayzak District
- In office 19 August 2019 – 26 April 2021
- Preceded by: Rahmatilda Rahmanberdiev
- Succeeded by: Baqyt Qazanbasov

Personal details
- Born: 31 March 1967 (age 59) Kazakh SSR, Soviet Union (now Kazakhstan)
- Education: Leningrad Agricultural Institute; Jambyl Humanitarian Technical University

Nurjan Moldiiaruly Nurjıgıtov (Kazakh: Нұржан Молдиярұлы Нұржігітов; born 31 March 1967) is a Kazakh politician who is serving as Minister of Water Resources and Irrigation of the Republic of Kazakhstan since 4 September 2023. Previously he was akim of the Jambyl Region from 2022 to 2023 and akim of Bayzak District from 2019 to 2021.

== Biography ==
Nurjıgıtov graduated from the Leningrad Agricultural Institute in 1991 with a degree in mechanical engineering and later earned a degree in economics from Jambyl Humanitarian Technical University in 2008. He holds the academic degree of Candidate of Technical Sciences.

He began his professional career in 1991 as a mechanic at the M. Gorky collective farm in the Jualy District of Jambyl Region. From 1992 to 1996, he worked as chief engineer of the Tole Bi agricultural association. Between 1996 and 1997, he served as a specialist and later chief specialist in the agriculture department of the Jualy District akim's office, followed by work as chief specialist in the economics department from 1997 to 2003.

From 2003 to 2006, Nurjıgıtov headed the general department of the Jualy District akim's office, and from 2006 to 2008 he led the district's entrepreneurship department. In 2008, he became chief inspector in the organizational, inspection, and personnel department of the Jambyl Region akim's office. Between 2008 and 2011, he headed the department responsible for monitoring the quality of public services in the regional akim's office.

From 2011 to 2014, he served as deputy head of the Jambyl Region Department of the Agency for Civil Service Affairs. He then headed the Department of Civil Service and Corruption Prevention of the regional branch of the Agency for Civil Service Affairs and Anti-Corruption from 2014 to 2015. Between 2015 and 2018, he was head of the Jambyl Region Department of Agriculture, followed by service as head of the Department of Natural Resources and Environmental Management from 2018 to 2019.

Nurjıgıtov served as akim of Bayzak District beginning on 19 August 2019 and continued in this role until he was appointed deputy akim of Jambyl Region on 26 April 2021. On 7 April 2022, he became akim of Jambyl Region, a position he held until 4 September 2023. On that date, he was appointed Minister of Water Resources and Irrigation of the Republic of Kazakhstan and was reappointed to the post on 6 February 2024.
