= Democratic Party (Kazakhstan, 1995) =

Democratic Party of Kazakhstan Қазақстан демократиялық партиясы
- Abbreviation: QDP
- Leader: Altynbek Sarsenbaiuly
- Founded: 1 July 1995; 29 years ago
- Dissolved: 1 March 1999; 26 years ago
- Merged into: Otan
- Ideology: Centre to centre-right

The Democratic Party of Kazakhstan (Kazakh: Қазақстан демократиялық партиясы, romanized: Qazaqstan demokratiialyq partiiasy) was a political party formed on 1 July 1995 at the initiative of a group of representatives of the state apparatus. It was led by Altynbek Sarsenbaiuly who was Minister of Press and Mass Media at the time. The party won 12 seats in the 1995 legislative elections. It merged into a newly created pro-presidential party Otan in its 1st Congress on 1 March 1999.
