= Erlan Särsembaev =

Kazakh jurist and politician (born 1975)

- Ерлан Сәрсембаев
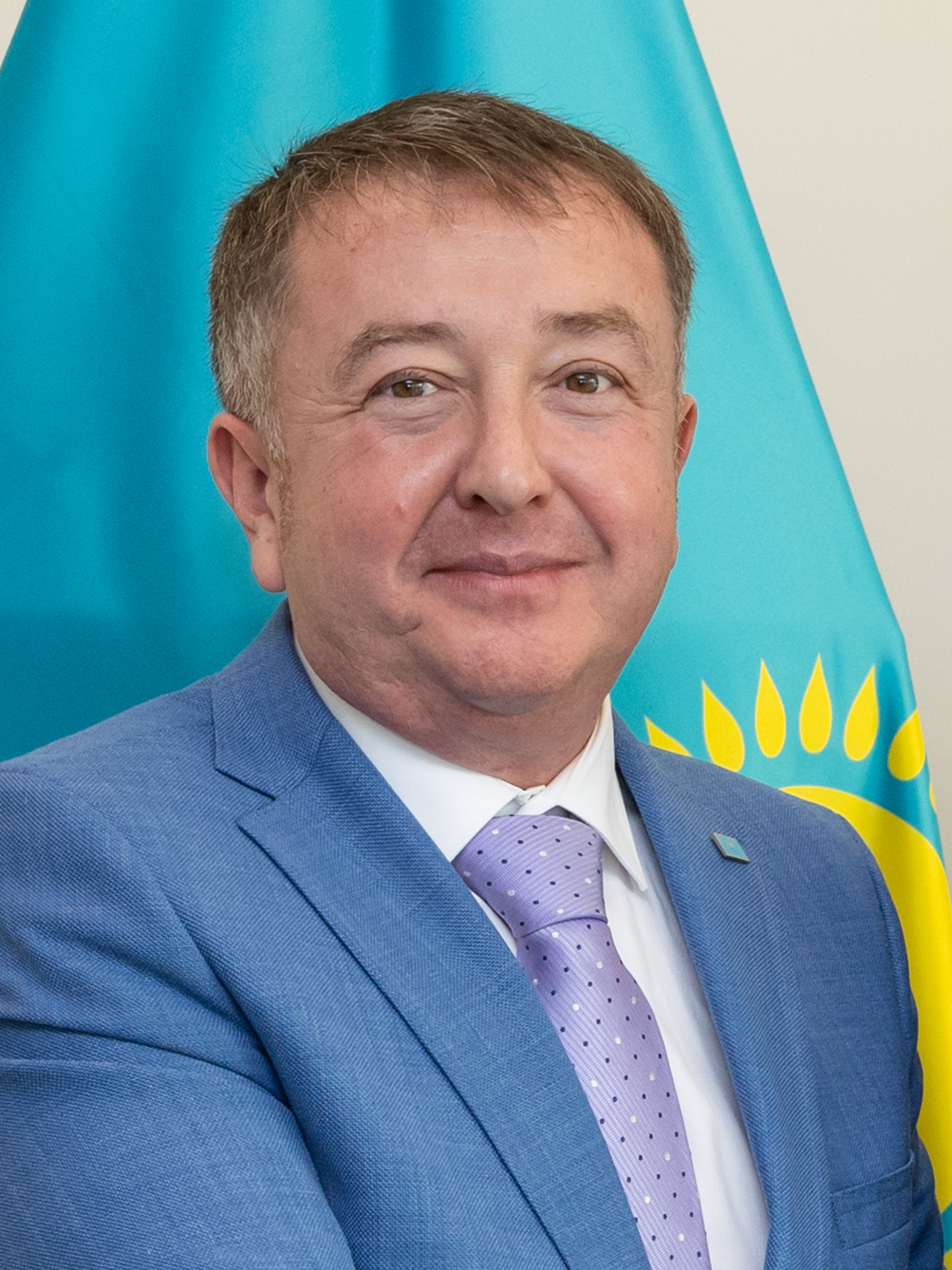
- Särsembaev in 2025

Minister of Justice
- Incumbent
- Assumed office 9 January 2025
- President: Qasym-Jomart Toqaev
- Prime Minister: Oljas Bektenov
- Preceded by: Azamat Esqaraev

Judge of the Constitutional Court of Kazakhstan
- In office 1 January 2023 – 9 January 2025
- Appointed by: Senate

Personal details
- Born: 1975 (age 50–51) Nura, Kazakh SSR, Soviet Union
- Education: Almaty Institute of Energy and Communications; D. A. Qonaev University of the Humanities
- Profession: Judge, lawyer
- Awards: Order of Qurmet; Medal for Distinguished Labor

Erlan Jaqsylyqūly Särsembaev (Note: Often transliterated as Yerlan Zhaksylykovich Sarsembayev through a Russified Romanization of Ерлан Жаксылыкович Сарсембаев.) (Kazakh: Ерлан Жақсылықұлы Сәрсембаев; born 1975) is a Kazakh jurist and politician who is serving as the minister of justice of the Republic of Kazakhstan since 2023. Previously he was a judge of the Constitutional Court of Kazakhstan from 2023 to 2025.

== Biography ==
Särsembaev was born in 1975 in the village of Nura, Talghar District, Almaty Region.

In 1997, he graduated from the Almaty Institute of Energy and Communications with a degree in radio engineering. In 2000, he graduated from the D. A. Qonaev University of the Humanities with a degree in law.

From 1998 to 2002, Särsembaev served in the Armed Forces of the Republic of Kazakhstan, holding the positions of officer, senior officer, and head of the international treaties division of the Department of International Military Cooperation of the Office of the Ministry of Defense of the Republic of Kazakhstan.

Between 2002 and 2005, Särsembaev worked in the Office of the Prime Minister as a consultant and later as head of the sector of the Department of Defense and Law Enforcement.

From 2005 to 2011, he worked in the Office of the Senate of the Parliament of Kazakhstan, serving as deputy head of the Department for Interaction with the Committee on International Affairs, Defense and Security, and later as head of the Department for Interaction with the Committee for Social and Cultural Development.

From 2011 to 2016, Särsembaev served as deputy head and then head of the Legal Department of the National Security Committee of the Republic of Kazakhstan.

In 2016–2017, Särsembaev was head of the Department for Interaction with the Committee on Socio-Cultural Development and Science of the Senate Office. From 2017 to 2019, he served as deputy chief of staff of the Senate, and from 2019 to 2022, he headed the Department for Interaction with the Committee on International Relations, Defense and Security of the Senate Office.

On 29 December 2022, Särsembaev was nominated to the Constitutional Court of the Republic of Kazakhstan by the chairman of the Senate, Mäwlen Äshimbaev, and was subsequently appointed by the deputies of the Senate. His judicial duties began on 1 January 2023, following the court's reorganization. From there, he served as a judge of the Constitutional Court.

On 9 January 2025, he was appointed Minister of Justice of the Republic of Kazakhstan in government of Olzhas Bektenov by the Decree of the president of the Republic of Kazakhstan Qasym-Zhomart Toqaev. Bektenov introduced Särsembaev to the staff and emphasized the Justice Ministry's primary task of implementing the principle of "Law and Order", noting Särsembaev's commitment to improving the notarial and legal advocacy institutions.

== Awards ==
- Order of Qurmet (28 August 2025)
- Medal for Distinguished Labor
- Badge "Best Civil Servant"
- Anniversary and departmental awards of the Supreme Court, the National Security Committee, the Ministry of Defense and the Ministry of Emergency Situations of the Republic of Kazakhstan.
