= Jaslan Mädiev =

Kazakh politician (born 1983)

- Жаслан Мәдиев
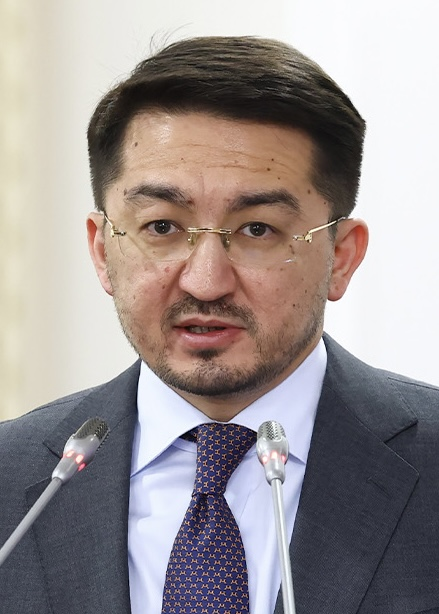
- Mädiev in 2026

Deputy Prime Minister of Kazakhstan
- Incumbent
- Assumed office 29 September 2025
- President: Kassym-Jomart Tokayev
- Prime Minister: Oljas Bektenov

Minister of Artificial Intelligence and Digital Development
- Incumbent
- Assumed office 29 September 2025
- President: Kassym-Jomart Tokayev
- Prime Minister: Oljas Bektenov
- Preceded by: Office established

Minister of Digital Development, Innovation and Aerospace Industry
- In office 6 May 2024 – 18 September 2025
- President: Kassym-Jomart Tokayev
- Prime Minister: Oljas Bektenov
- Preceded by: Bağdat Musin
- Succeeded by: Office abolished (himself as deputy prime minister for artificial intelligence and digital development)

Personal details
- Born: 13 June 1983 (age 43) Almaty, Kazakh SSR, Soviet Union
- Spouse: Mayra Turğanova
- Education: Al-Farabi Kazakh National University; Columbia University (SIPA); Massachusetts Institute of Technology (Sloan)

Jaslan Hasenūly Mädiev (Kazakh: Жаслан Хасенұлы Мәдиев, [ʐɑsˈɫɑn xɑsʲeno̙ˈɫɯ mæˈdɘjəf]; born 13 June 1983) is a Kazakh politician who is currently serving as the Deputy Prime Minister and Minister of Artificial Intelligence and Digital Development since 2025.

Colloquially known as "the main guy on crypto", Mädiev may be most recognisable for his former position as General Manager of Binance Kazakhstan. His management started in October 2022 and ended with his appointment as Minister.

== Early life and education ==
Jaslan Mädiev was born on 13 June 1983, in Almaty. After pursuing his education at the Al-Farabi Kazakh National University for the specialty "World Economy and International Finance" in 2004, Mädiev studied at the School of International and Public Affairs of the Columbia University as part of his Bolashak scholarship programme. From there, he earned a degree in "Economic Policy Management" in 2007.

In 2016, Mädiev graduated from the MIT Sloan School of Management in Boston, Massachusetts, earning a master's degree in Business Administration.

== Career ==
Mädiev began his career in 2004, as a specialist at the JSC "Alliance Bank", afterwards, he worked for a short time at the Morgan Stanley investment bank in London. Subsequently, from 2007 to 2008 he was the chief manager of the corporate finance department of the Kazyna Sustainable Development Fund, an expert at the Center for Strategic Development and Analysis of the Presidential Administration of Kazakhstan, and director of the treasury department of the Samruk-Kazyna fund in 2008.

From 2009 to 2010, Mädiev served as deputy chairman of the Board of the "KAZYNA CAPITAL MANAGEMENT" JSC, and in the years 2010 to 2014, he worked as the Managing Director-Member and deputy chairman of the Board of the Development Bank of Kazakhstan.

Starting from 2014 and ending with 2015, he held various managing position in the National Bank of Kazakhstan. Afterwards, from 2017 to 2018, Mädiev was acting vice president, vice president for finance of Kazakhstan Temir Joly. In 2018 he became President of the department.

On 9 April 2019, Mädiev appointed as the Vice Minister of National Economy of Kazakhstan. From 1 October 2020 to 13 January 2022, he served as the deputy chairman of the Agency for Strategic Planning and Reforms of Kazakhstan.

On 14 January 2022, it was announced that Mädiev was appointed as First Deputy Minister of Digital Development, Innovation and Aerospace Industry, becoming the Vice Minister to controversial Bağdat Musin. In October 2022, he also became the General Manager of Binance Kazakhstan.

Following Bağdat Musin's "willing" resignation in April 2024, the ministerial post was briefly left vacant. On 6 May 2024, President Kassym-Jomart Tokayev then appointed Mädiev as the new Minister of Digital Development, Innovation and Aerospace Industry. Following the reorganization of the ministry into the Ministry of Artificial Intelligence and Digital Development, Madiev was appointed Deputy Prime Minister and Minister of Artificial Intelligence and Digital Development on 29 September 2025.

== Personal life ==
Jaslan Mädiev is married to Mayra Turğanova, second daughter of Kazakh politician and deputy of Mäjilis Düisenbai Turğanov.

== Awards and decorations ==
Mädiev's awards and decorations include:

- Medal for Distinguished Labor (December 2020);
- Medal "for 20 years of Kazakhstan's independence" (2011);
- Letter of gratitude from the Chairman of Samruk-Kazyna.
