= Qanat Şarlapaev =

Kazakh politician (born 1981)

- Қанат Шарлапаев
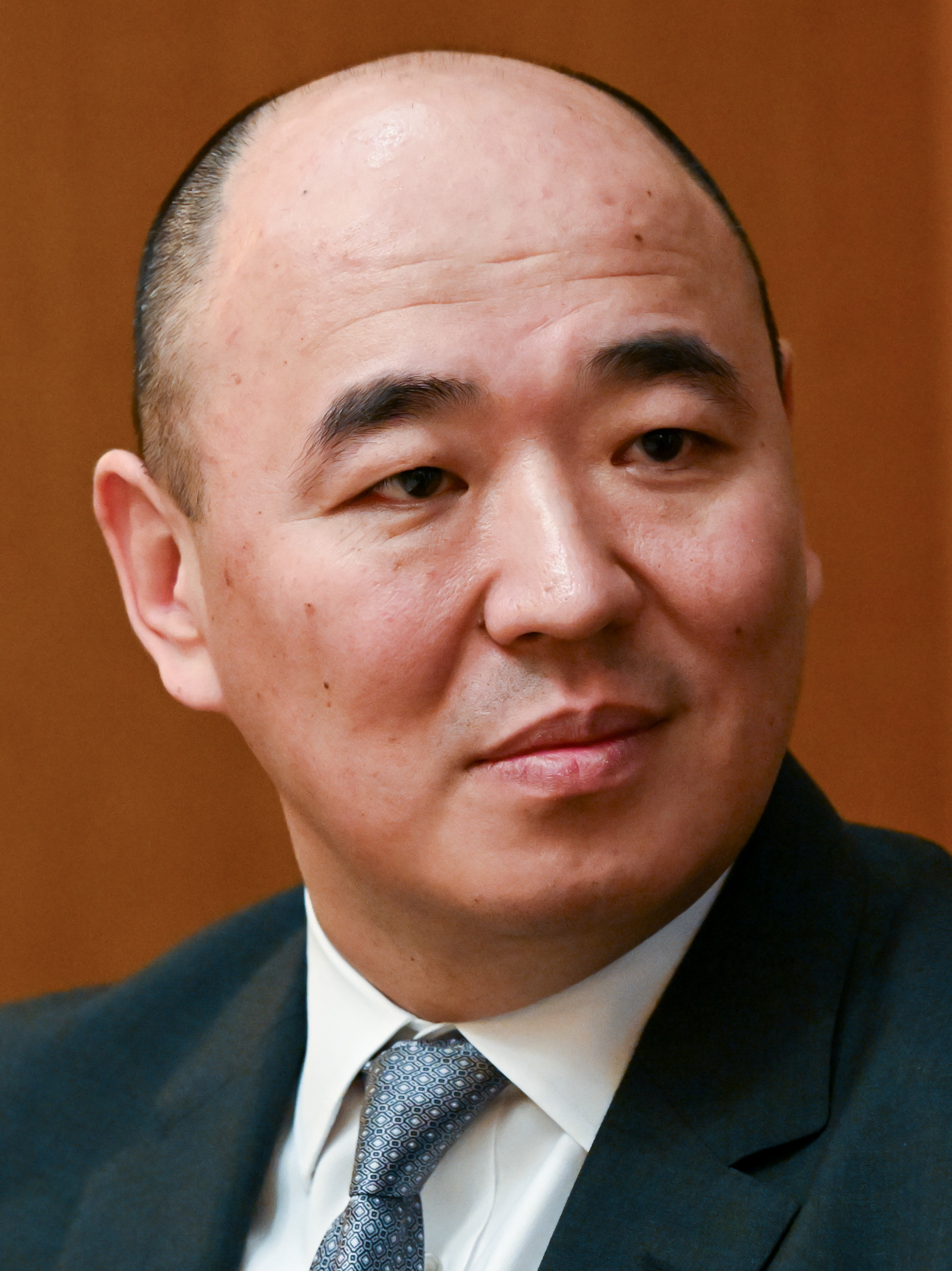
- Şarlapaev in 2023

Minister of Industry and Construction
- In office 4 September 2023 – 28 February 2025
- President: Kassym-Jomart Tokayev
- Prime Minister: Älihan Smaiylov; Roman Sklyar (acting); Oljas Bektenov
- Preceded by: Marat Qarabaev (Industry and Infrastructure Development)
- Succeeded by: Ersaiyn Nağaspaev

Personal details
- Born: 9 June 1981 (age 45) Saratov Oblast, Russian SFSR, Soviet Union (now Russia)
- Children: 3
- Education: Saratov Socio-Economic Institute; Cranfield School of Management

Qanat Bisimbaiuly Şarlapaev (Note: Often transliterated as Kanat Bisimbayevich Sharlapayev through a Russified Romanization of Канат Бисимбаевич Шарлапаев.) (Kazakh: Қанат Бисимбайұлы Шарлапаев; 9 June 1981) is a Kazakh politician who served as Minister of Industry and Construction of Kazakhstan from 4 September 2023 to 28 February 2025. From 28 February to 25 September 2025, he was assistant to the president of the Republic of Kazakhstan for Economic Affairs.

== Biography ==
=== Early life and education ===
Şarlapaev was born in the Saratov Oblast, Russian SFSR. He graduated from the Saratov Socio-Economic Institute with a specialty in accounting and audit. He later received a master's degree in finance and management from the Cranfield School of Management (United Kingdom).

=== Early career ===
From 2006 to 2008, Şarlapaev worked in the Financial Department of the Regional Office, the Project Management Department, the Operations and Technology Department, and Sales Management at Citi Investment Bank in the United Kingdom and the Czech Republic.

From 2008 to 2014, he served as senior analyst, assistant vice president, and vice president in the Regional Equity Division of Citi Investment Bank in London.

In 2014–2015, he was vice president of the Regional Strategic Planning and Analysis Group for Europe, the Middle East, and Africa at Citi Investment Bank in London.

From 2015 to 2017, Şarlapaev served as chief financial officer, deputy chairman of the management board, and senior vice president of Citibank Kazakhstan.

Between 2017 and 2020, he was chief financial officer for Russia, Ukraine, and Kazakhstan, as well as Senior Vice President of Citibank Russia.

From 2020 to 2022, he was regional director for strategy, planning, and analysis in emerging markets (Africa, the Middle East, and Eastern Europe) at Citi Investment Bank in the UAE.

From 21 February 2022 to September 2023, Şarlapaev served as chairman of the Board of Baiterek National Managing Holding JSC.

=== Minister of Industry and Construction (2023–2025) ===
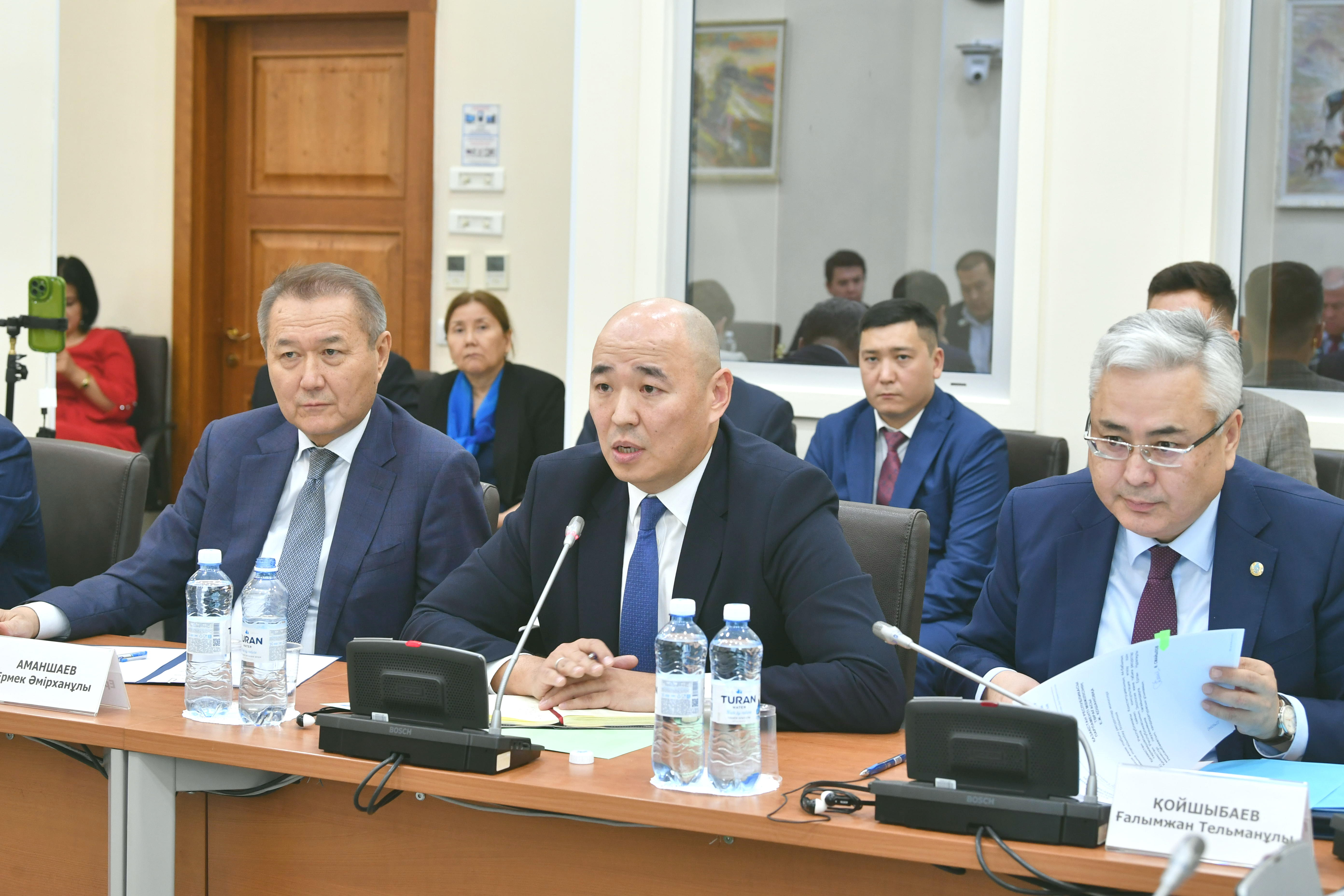
Şarlapaev at the Mäjilis discussion of his ministerial candidacy, 4 September 2023

Şarlapaev served as Minister of Industry and Construction from 4 September 2023 to 28 February 2025, having been reappointed to the post on 6 February 2024.

During his tenure, he oversaw industrial policy, transport and logistics regulation, and the government's position on the recycling fee for imported vehicles. In 2024, the ministry reviewed a public petition which gathered over 50,000 signatures calling for the abolition of the fee, after which Şarlapaev publicly defended retaining the utilisbor, arguing it was necessary for regulatory and industrial policy purposes. The decision generated public debate, and the ministry formally confirmed that the recycling fee would remain in place.

Şarlapaev's period in office saw the ministry continue work on planned industrial and construction programmes, including investment projects in metallurgy, chemicals, building materials, and housing development, as well as ongoing modernisation of sectoral standards and regulatory frameworks.

=== Other activities ===
On 25 January 2025, he was elected President of the Rugby Federation of Kazakhstan.

From 28 February to 25 September 2025, he served as assistant to the president of the Republic of Kazakhstan for Economic Affairs.

== Personal life ==
Şarlapaev is married, has three children, and speaks Kazakh, Russian, and English.

Before entering government, Şarlapaev had held Russian and British citizenship, later becoming a citizen of Kazakhstan. Upon becoming minister in 2023, Şarlapaev revealed that he was actively studying the Kazakh language, taking lessons five times a week.
