= Modern Pentathlon Federation of Kazakhstan =

- Sport: Modern pentathlon
- Jurisdiction: Kazakhstan
- Abbreviation: MPFK
- Affiliation: UIPM
- Headquarters: Imanova str. 22, Nur-Sultan
- President: Berik Imashev

Official website
- www.pentathlon.kz
- (Kazakhstan)

The Modern Pentathlon Federation of Kazakhstan (MPFK; Kazakh: Қазақстандық қазіргі бессайыс федерациясы, Qazaqstandyq qazirgi bessaıys federatsııasy; Russian: Казахстанская федерация современного пятиборья) is the governing body for the sport of modern pentathlon in Kazakhstan.
