= Ministry of Industry and Construction =

Ministry of Kazakhstan

Ministry of Industry and Construction of the Republic of Kazakhstan
- Қазақстан Республикасы Өнеркәсіп және құрылыс министрлігі (Kazakh); Министерство промышленности и строительства Республики Казахстан (Russian)
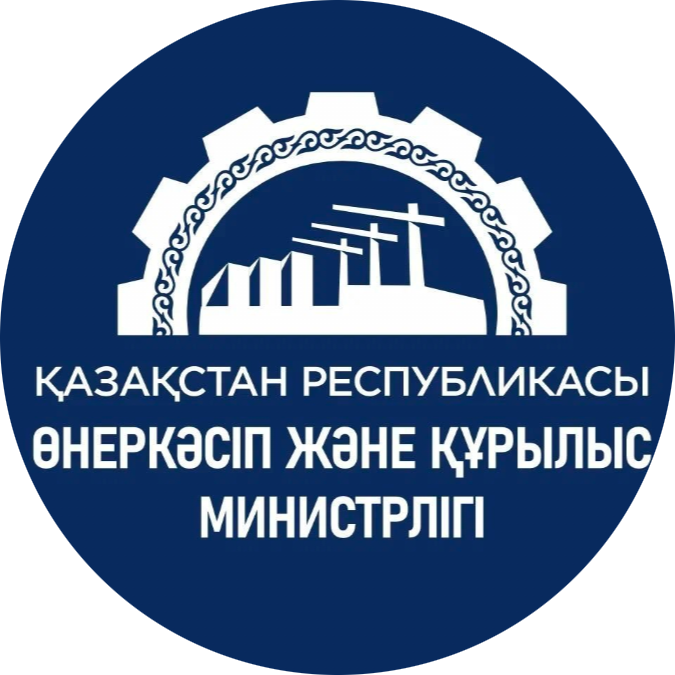

Agency overview
- Formed: 1 September 2023
- Preceding agency: Ministry of Industry and Infrastructure Development
- Jurisdiction: Government of Kazakhstan
- Headquarters: 32/1 Kabanbay Batyr Avenue, Astana 010000, Kazakhstan; 51°7′53″N 71°24′59″E
- Minister responsible: Ersaiyn Nağaspaev, Minister of Industry and Construction
- Website: www.gov.kz/memleket/entities/mps

The Ministry of Industry and Construction of the Republic of Kazakhstan (MIC RK; Kazakh: Қазақстан Республикасы Өнеркәсіп және құрылыс министрлігі, ҚР ӨҚМ; Russian: Министерство промышленности и строительства Республики Казахстан, МПС РК) is a ministry under the Government of Kazakhstan responsible for state policy and coordination across a wide range of industrial, construction, and defense-related sectors. It oversees manufacturing industries, mining and metallurgy, machinery safety, chemical product regulation, and energy efficiency. In construction, it manages building materials production, urban planning, housing policy, and municipal services such as water, heat, and sewerage. The ministry also regulates special economic zones, conducts geological studies, oversees solid mineral subsoil use, and manages the defense industry, including military-technical cooperation and the state defense order.

== History ==
On 1 September 2023, President Kassym-Jomart Tokayev signed the Decree No. 318 "On measures to further improve the public administration system of the Republic of Kazakhstan", which divided the Ministry of Industry and Infrastructure Development into two separate bodies: the Ministry of Industry and Construction and the Ministry of Transport. The newly created Ministry of Industry and Construction assumed all former industry, construction, and defense-industry functions, overseeing industrial sectors, construction and urban planning, special economic zones, subsoil use (except uranium), housing and communal services, and military-technical policy and procurement. Tokayev appointed Qanat Şarlapaev as minister on 4 September 2023.

== Structure ==
=== Committees ===
The Ministry includes the following departments:

- Committee of Geology of the Ministry of Industry and Construction of the Republic of Kazakhstan
- Industry Committee of the Ministry of Industry and Construction of the Republic of Kazakhstan
- Committee for Construction, Housing and Utilities of the Ministry of Industry and Construction of the Republic of Kazakhstan
- State Defense Order Committee of the Ministry of Industry and Construction of the Republic of Kazakhstan

=== Organisations ===
- "Kazakhstan Center for Industry and Export "QazIndustry" Joint-Stock Company
- Kazakhstan Engineering)»
- Joint-Stock Company "Management Company of the Special Economic Zone "Chemical Park Taraz""
- Joint-Stock Company "Fund for the Development of the Military-Industrial Complex".

== Objectives ==
1. formation and implementation of state policy in the spheres of industry; development of intra-country value; mining and metallurgical complex; Engineering; coal, chemical, light (except for the processing of skins and wool of farm animals), woodworking and furniture industries; construction industry and production of building materials; safety of machinery and equipment; safety of chemical products in accordance with the industry focus; control of specific goods; energy conservation and energy efficiency; production of precious metals and circulation of precious metals and precious stones; commodities containing precious metals; jewelry and other products; creation, operation and abolition of special economic zones; state management of subsoil use in terms of solid minerals, except for uranium mining; state geological study of the subsoil, reproduction of the mineral resource base; architectural, urban planning and construction activities; housing relations; communal services; water supply and sewerage, heat supply (except for combined heat and power plants and boiler houses producing heat energy in the district heating zone) within the boundaries of settlements; equity participation in housing construction; defense industry;
2. implementation of intersectoral coordination of state bodies in the field of activity within the competence of the Ministry;
3. implementation of state control in regulated areas;
4. public administration in regulated areas;
5. maintaining gender balance in hiring and promotion of employees;
6. creation of an effective system of the military-industrial complex;
7. provision of the Armed Forces of the Republic of Kazakhstan, other troops and military formations, special state and law enforcement agencies of the Republic of Kazakhstan with modern military goods (products), dual-use goods (products), military works and military services;
8. use of scientific, technological and production potential of organizations of the military-industrial complex in civilian industries;
9. ensuring the creation of modern types of weapons, military and special equipment in the interests of increasing and strengthening the defense capability, security and law and order in the state;
10. support and further development of the export potential of organizations of the military-industrial complex;
11. development of applied research, development work and their further commercialization;
12. participation in the implementation of a unified military-technical policy and the implementation of military-technical cooperation;
13. management in the field of formation, placement and implementation of the state defense order;
14. improvement of legislation in the field of geology and reproduction of the mineral resource base;
15. implementation of state control over operations on geological study of subsoil, as well as the use of subsoil space;
16. implementation of other tasks assigned to the Ministry, within its competence.

== List of ministers ==
- Qanat Şarlapaev (4 September 2023 — 28 February 2025)
- Ersaiyn Nağaspaev (28 February 2025 — present)

== See also ==
- Ministry of Industry and Infrastructure Development
- Ministry of Transport (Kazakhstan)
- Government of Kazakhstan
