= Ski Federation of Kazakhstan =

- Sport: Skiing
- Jurisdiction: Kazakhstan
- Abbreviation: SFK
- Affiliation: International Ski and Snowboard Federation (FIS)
- Headquarters: Turan str. 2, Nur-Sultan
- President: Umirzak Shukeyev

Official website
- www.nflg.kz
- (Kazakhstan)

The Ski Federation of Kazakhstan (Kazakh: Қазақстан Республикасының шаңғы жарыстары федерациясы, romanized: Qazaqstan Respublikasynyñ şañğy jarystary federatsiiasy; Russian: Национальная федерация лыжных гонок Республики Казахстан) is the national governing body for skiing in Kazakhstan. The organisation was founded in 1992 among local ski clubs. The Ski Federation of Kazakhstan represents international interests of the Kazakhstani skiing and trains athletes and trainers. The SFK headquarters are located in Nur-Sultan. Current SFK president is Umirzak Shukeyev.

== Divisions ==
- Competitive sport:
  - Alpine skiing
  - Biathlon
  - Cross-country skiing
  - Freestyle skiing
  - Nordic combined
  - Skicross
  - Ski jumping
  - Telemark skiing
