= Nura, Talgar District =

Nura Нұра
- Village
- Location in Kazakhstan
- Coordinates: 43°41′17″N 77°11′29″E
- Country: Kazakhstan
- Region: Almaty Region
- District: Talgar District

Population (2009)
  - Total: 4,327
- Time zone: UTC+6 (Omsk Time)
- Post code: 041621

Nura (Kazakh: Нұра, Nūra), until 1998 "Oktyabr", is a village in Almaty Region, in south-eastern Kazakhstan. It is the head of the Nura Rural District (KATO code - 196257100). Population: 4,327 (2009 census results); 3,864 (1999 census results). The center of the district is located 65 km north of the city of Talgar, on the banks of the Terengkara River, a branch of Talgar, near the Kapchagai dam, in a desert belt

== Geography ==
The village is located in an arid zone 65 km (40 mi) north of Talgar city. It lies by the banks of the Terengkara river, a tributary of the Talgar, near the Kapchagay Dam.
