= Ersaiyn Nağaspaev =

- Ерсайын Нағаспаев
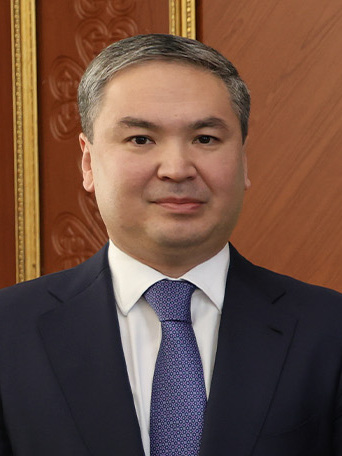
- Nağaspaev in 2025

Minister of Industry and Construction
- Incumbent
- Assumed office 28 February 2025
- President: Kassym-Jomart Tokayev
- Prime Minister: Oljas Bektenov
- Preceded by: Qanat Şarlapaev

Deputy Äkim of Astana
- In office 1 February 2013 – 3 December 2014
- Äkim: Imangali Tasmagambetov; Adilbek Zhaksybekov
- Preceded by: Erlan Qojağapanov
- Succeeded by: Andrey Lukin

Äkim of Shakhtinsk
- In office 22 January 2011 – 1 February 2013
- Preceded by: Erlan Öteşev
- Succeeded by: Aleksandr Agliulin

Personal details
- Born: 28 July 1980 (age 46) Karaganda, Kazakh SSR, Soviet Union
- Children: 2
- Education: Karagandy State University

Ersaiyn Qaiyrğazyuly Nağaspaev (Note: Often transliterated as Ерсайын Каиргазиевич Нагаспаев through a Russified Romanization of Yersayin Kairgazievich Nagaspayev.) (Kazakh: Ерсайын Қайырғазыұлы Нағаспаев; born 28 July 1980) is a Kazakh politician who has served as Minister of Industry and Construction of the Republic of Kazakhstan since 28 February 2025.

== Biography ==
Nağaspaev was born in the city of Karaganda. In 2001, he graduated from Karaganda State University named after E. Buketov with a degree in International Economic Relations. He began his professional career in the office of the akim of Temirtau.

In 2002–2003, he served as an attaché of the Investment Committee and as an attaché of the Ministry of Foreign Affairs of the Republic of Kazakhstan. From 2003 to 2006, he worked as an attaché and later third secretary at the Embassy of the Republic of Kazakhstan in the Russian Federation.

Between 2006 and 2007, he held the positions of head of department and deputy director of the Department of Transport Policy and International Cooperation at the Ministry of Transport and Communications of the Republic of Kazakhstan. From 2007 to 2009, he served as deputy head and chief of staff of the Republican State Enterprise Aktau International Sea Trade Port. In 2009, he was appointed deputy director of the Department of Administrative Work, Public Relations, and Public Procurement of the Ministry of Transport and Communications.

From November to December 2009, Nağaspaev served as advisor to the deputy prime minister of the Republic of Kazakhstan, after which he became deputy akim of the Kazybek Bi District of Karaganda, a position he held from 2009 to 2010. In 2010–2011, he worked as adviser to the akim of Karaganda Region.

From 22 January 2011, he served as akim of Shakhtinsk, and from 1 February 2013 to 3 December 2014 as deputy akim of Astana.

Between 2014 and 2016, Nağaspaev was chairman of the Board of JSC Social and Entrepreneurial Corporation Astana. From 2016 to 2020, he served as deputy director for Strategic Development of Novostroy Astana LLP. In 2021–2022, he held the position of managing director for Support at NC Kazakhstan Temir Joly JSC, and from 2022 to 2025 served as acting managing director and managing director for New Projects of the company.

On 28 February 2025, he was appointed Minister of Industry and Construction of the Republic of Kazakhstan by President Kassym-Jomart Tokayev.
