= Ministry of Communications and Information (Kazakhstan) =

Government ministry of Kazakhstan

Ministry of Communications and Information of the Republic of Kazakhstan
- Қазақстан Республикасы Байланыс және ақпарат министрлігі (Kazakh); Министерство связи и информации Республики Казахстан (Russian)
- Emblem of Kazakhstan

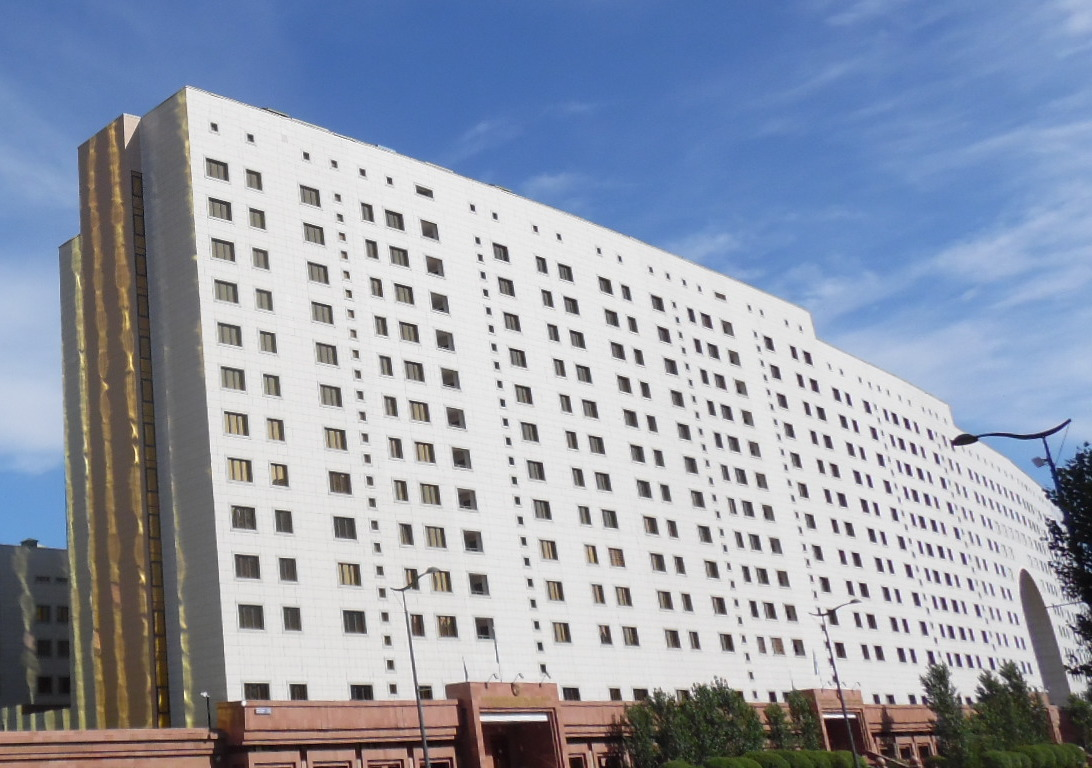
- House of Ministries

Agency overview
- Formed: 31 August 1991
- Dissolved: 20 January 2012
- Superseding agencies: Ministry of Culture and Information; Ministry of Transport and Communications
- Jurisdiction: Government of Kazakhstan
- Headquarters: Astana, Kazakhstan

The Ministry of Communications and Information of the Republic of Kazakhstan (MCI RK, Kazakh: Қазақстан Республикасы Байланыс және ақпарат министрлігі, romanized: Qazaqstan Respublikasy Bailanys jäne aqparat ministrlıgı, [bɑjlɑnˈəs ʒæˈnɛ ɑxpɑrˈɑt mʲiˈnʲɪstrləɡə], ҚР БАМ; Russian: Министерство связи и информации Республики Казахстан, romanized: Ministerstvo svyazi i informatsii Respubliki Kazakhstan, MSI RK, МСИ РК) was a ministerial body of the Government of Kazakhstan as part of the Cabinet of Ministers. The Ministry was responsible for communications and in the areas of informational, media, archiving and documentation, automation of public services and coordination of public service activities.

== History ==
The Ministry was originally created on 31 August 1991 as Ministry of Print and Mass Media with Quanysh Sultanov being its first Minister.

On 14 October 1995, it was formed into the National Agency for Press and Mass Media of the Republic of Kazakhstan until being reestablished as Ministry of Information and Public Accord on 13 October 1997. Following the cabinet restructuring, the Ministry from 22 January 1999 was part of the Ministry of Culture, Information and Public Accord.

On 14 September 2003, it became the Ministry of Information to which it was led by Sauytbek Adrahmanov. The Ministry lasted until it was merged into the Ministry of Culture, Information, and Sports on 29 September 2004.

The Ministry was created on 12 March 2010 as Ministry of Communications and Information after major changes and rearrangements in the Government through the incorporation of the Agency of the Republic of Kazakhstan on Information and Communications which was reorganized into the Committee and Committee for Information and Archives of the former Ministry of Culture and Information. The Joint Stock Company "Arna Media National Information Holding" was also transferred to the new ministry, however, it was later disbanded.

The Ministry was led by Askar Zhumagaliyev and was eventually disbanded on 20 January 2012 with all its functions being transferred to the Ministry of Culture and Information and Ministry of Transport and Communications.

== Structure ==
The structure of the ministry was three committees:

- Committee of Information and Archives;
- Committee of Communications and Informatization;
- Committee for the Control of Automation of Public Services and Coordination of Public Service Centers.

== List of ministers ==
=== Print and mass media ===
- Quanysh Sultanov (31 August 1991 – 18 January 1993);
- Altynbek Sarsenbayuly (18 January 1993 – 14 October 1995).

=== Information and public accord ===
- Altynbek Sarsenbayuly (13 October 1997 – 22 January 1999).

=== Information ===
- Sauytbek Adrahmanov (14 September 2003 – 12 July 2004);
- Altynbek Sarsenbayuly (12 July 2004 – 29 September 2004).

=== Communications and information ===
- Askar Zhumagaliyev (12 March 2010 – 20 January 2012).
