= Ministry of Transport and Communications (Kazakhstan) =

Government ministry of Kazakhstan

Ministry of Transport and Communications of the Republic of Kazakhstan
- Қазақстан Республикасы Көлік және коммуникациялар министрлігі (Kazakh); Министерство транспорта и коммуникаций Республики Казахстан (Russian)
- Emblem of Kazakhstan

- Office building of the Ministry of Transport and Communications

Agency overview
- Formed: 13 June 1994
- Preceding agencies: Ministry of Transport; Ministry of Communications and Information
- Dissolved: 6 August 2014
- Superseding agency: Ministry for Investment and Development
- Jurisdiction: Government of Kazakhstan
- Headquarters: Astana, Kazakhstan

The Ministry of Transport and Communications of the Republic of Kazakhstan (MTC RK, Kazakh: Қазақстан Республикасы Көлік және коммуникациялар министрлігі, romanized: Qazaqstan Respublikasy Kölık jäne kommunikatsiialar ministrlıgı, ҚР ККМ; Russian: Министерство транспорта и коммуникаций Республики Казахстан, МТК РК) was a department of the Government of Kazakhstan, providing leadership and intersectoral coordination on the development and implementation of state policy in the field of transport and communications.

On 6 August 2014, during the reorganization of the Government, the Ministry was abolished and its functions were transferred to the new Ministry for Investment and Development.
