= Ministry of Digital Development, Innovation and Aerospace Industry (Kazakhstan) =

Government ministry of Kazakhstan

Ministry of Digital Development, Innovation and Aerospace Industry of the Republic of Kazakhstan
- Қазақстан Республикасы Цифрлық даму, инновациялар және аэроғарыш өнеркәсібі министрлігі (Kazakh); Министерство цифрового развития, инноваций и аэрокосмической промышленности Республики Казахстан (Russian)
- Emblem of Kazakhstan

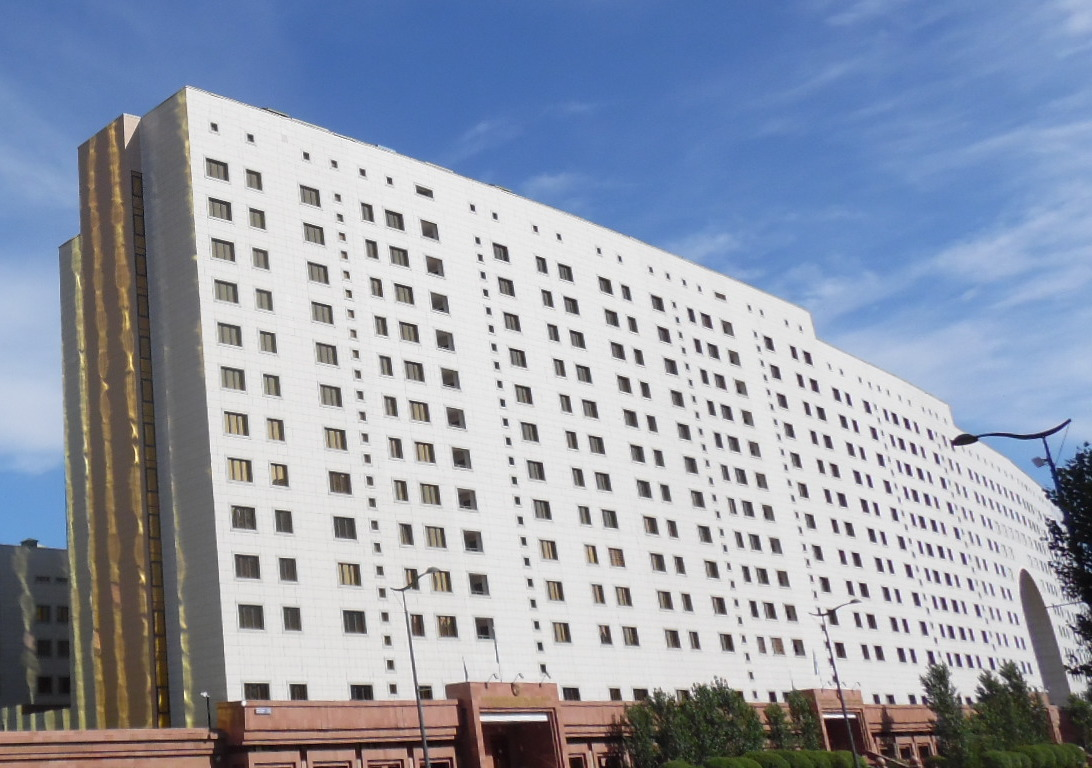
- House of Ministries

Agency overview
- Formed: 6 October 2016
- Dissolved: 18 September 2025
- Superseding agency: Ministry of Artificial Intelligence and Digital Development
- Jurisdiction: Government of Kazakhstan
- Headquarters: Astana, Kazakhstan
- Agency executive: Jaslan Mädiev, Minister

The Ministry of Digital Development, Innovation and Aerospace Industry of the Republic of Kazakhstan (MDDIAI RK, Kazakh: Қазақстан Республикасы Цифрлық даму, инновациялар және аэроғарыш өнеркәсібі министрлігі, romanized: Qazaqstan Respublikası Sifrlıq damu, innovasiyalar jäne aeroğarış önerkäsıbı ministrlıgı, ҚР ЦДИАӨМ; Russian: Министерство цифрового развития, инноваций и аэрокосмической промышленности Республики Казахстан, romanized: Ministerstvo tsifrovogo razvitiya, innovatsiy i aerokosmicheskoy promyshlennosti Respubliki Kazakhstan, МЦРИАП РК) is a central executive body of the Government of Kazakhstan that was established in 2016. The ministry was abolished in 2025.

The ministry is responsible for the implementation of state policy in the field of defense, aerospace and electronic industries, information security in the field of cybersecurity, mobilization training and mobilization, the formation and development of the state material reserve, participation in a unified military-technical policy and military-technical cooperation, leadership in the formation, placement and implementation of the defense order.

== History ==
It was originally established as the Ministry of Defense and Aerospace Industry on 6 October 2016 by a presidential decree.

On 25 February 2019, by the presidential decree of Nursultan Nazarbayev, the previously Ministry of Defense and Aerospace Industry was reorganized into the Ministry of Digital Development, Defense and Aerospace Industry. All functions and powers in the field of communications, information, "electronic government", and the development of state policy in the provision of public services was transferred from the Ministry of Information and Communications of the Republic of Kazakhstan.

On 17 June 2019, by a presidential decree, the ministry's functions and powers in the field of defense industry, participation in a unified military-technical policy, military-technical cooperation, and the formation, placement and implementation of the state defense order were transferred to the Ministry of Industry and Infrastructure Development. In the field of mobilization training and mobilization, the formation and development of the state material reserve to the Ministry of National Economy, while the remaining functions of the Ministry itself was transformed into the Ministry of Digital Development, Innovation and Aerospace Industry.

The purpose of the department is to achieve and maintain the level of security of electronic information resources, information systems and information and communication infrastructure from external and internal threats, ensuring sustainable development of the Republic of Kazakhstan in the context of global competition.

On September 18, 2025, by president Kassym-Jomart Tokayev's decree, responsibility for innovation policy was transferred to the Ministry of Science and Higher Education, and that ministry was abolished and replaced by the Ministry of Artificial Intelligence and Digital Development.
