= Saint Petersburg State Agrarian University =

Public university in Saint Petersburg, Russia

- Санкт-Петербургский государственный аграрный университет
- Motto: Нам доверено заботиться о земле!
- Motto in English: We are entrusted to take care of the earth!
- Type: public
- Established: 1904
- Location: Pushkin, Saint Petersburg, Russia
- Campus: urban
- Language: Russian
- Colours
- Website: https://spbgau.ru/

Saint Petersburg State Agrarian University (Russian: Санкт-Петербургский государственный аграрный университет) is a public university located in Saint Petersburg, Russia. It was founded in 1904.

== History ==
September 8, 1904 in St. Petersburg on the initiative of Professor Ivan Alexandrovich Stebut, opened the Higher Women's Agricultural Courses. In the first year, Stebut's courses accepted 80 female students. The term of study was at first 2 years, soon - 3, and soon - 4 years. There were more than 40 teachers.

One hundred graduates a year was not enough to meet the needs of the national agriculture in qualified personnel. There was a question of opening another agricultural courses for men and women in the capital. Such courses were opened in 1906. In the first year, 178 people were enrolled there. Within seven years the number of students had increased by 8 times, and by 1913 the courses were attended by 1400 people.

In 1908 the Evening Agronomic Courses of the Society of People's Universities were organized. In 1918 all the above-mentioned educational institutions were reorganized into state agricultural institutes - the Petrograd Agronomic Institute was one of them. In 1922 the Petrograd Agricultural Institute was organized on the basis of three institutes.

By 1941 the institute had 16 departments with 550 students and 50 teachers. During World War II the institute was not evacuated. In the fall of 1942 about 150 people, mostly girls from Siberia, were admitted to the institute.

In the 1950s the institute was repeatedly restructured, reorganized and renamed.

In 1991, the Leningrad Agricultural Institute was transformed into the Leningrad State Agrarian University. On January, 20th 1992 LSAU was renamed Saint-Petersburg State Agrarian University (SPSAU) in connection with returning the name Saint-Petersburg to Leningrad.

As of 2022, the university had about 5,000 students, including about 330 international students from 34 countries. SPbGAU offers 65 main educational programmes and 55 additional professional educational programmes. The university trains specialists in 24 Bachelor's degree programs, 15 Master's degree programs, and 23 postgraduate programs.

== Structure ==
- Faculty of Agricultural Technology, Soil Science and Ecology
- Faculty of Zooengineering and Biotechnology
- Faculty of Land Management and Agricultural Construction
- Faculty of Engineering and Technology
- Faculty of Electrical Engineering
- Faculty of Economics and Management in Agribusiness
- Faculty of Law
- Academy of Management and Agribusiness
- International center (on the rights of the Faculty of foreign students)
- College
