= Ministry of Water Resources and Irrigation (Kazakhstan) =

Ministry of Kazakhstan

Ministry of Water Resources and Irrigation of the Republic of Kazakhstan
- Қазақстан Республикасы Су ресурстары және ирригация министрлігі (Kazakh); Министерство водных ресурсов и ирригации Республики Казахстан (Russian)
- Emblem of Kazakhstan

Agency overview
- Formed: 1 September 2023
- Preceding agency: Ministry of Ecology and Natural Resources
- Jurisdiction: Government of Kazakhstan
- Headquarters: 8 Mangilik El Avenue, House of Ministries, Entrance 16B, Astana 010000, Kazakhstan; 51°07′41″N 71°25′50″E
- Minister responsible: Nurjan Nurjigitov, Minister of Water Resources and Irrigation
- Website: www.gov.kz/memleket/entities/water

The Ministry of Water Resources and Irrigation of the Republic of Kazakhstan (MWRI RK; Kazakh: Қазақстан Республикасы Су ресурстары және ирригация министрлігі, ҚР СРИМ; Russian: Министерство водных ресурсов и ирригации Республики Казахстан, МВРИ РК) is a ministry under the Government of Kazakhstan responsible for the formation and implementation of state policy and coordination of management processes in the areas of water use and protection, water supply, sanitation, and irrigation. The Ministry was established on 1 September 2023, separating it from the Ministry of Ecology and Natural Resources and transferring functions and powers in water management, water supply, and sanitation.

== History ==
The management of water resources in Kazakhstan dates back to the People's Commissariat of Water Management, established by the Presidium of the Supreme Soviet of the Kazakh SSR on 25 February 1940. In March 1946, it was transformed into the Ministry of Water Resources of the Kazakh SSR. Over time, the agency underwent several reorganizations.

On 1 September 2023, amid growing concerns over water scarcity, deteriorating infrastructure, and dependence on transboundary water sources, President Kassym-Jomart Tokayev proposed restructuring the National Hydrogeological Service, renovating and reforming the Qazsushar and Nura Group Water Pipeline facilities, and creating the Ministry of Water Resources and Irrigation, which was formally established by Presidential Decree No. 318 "On measures to further improve the system of public administration of the Republic of Kazakhstan", separating it from the Ministry of Ecology and Natural Resources. On 4 September, Nurjan Nurjigitov was appointed as the first minister.

== Structure ==
The Ministry includes the Water Management Committee of the Ministry of Water Resources and Irrigation of the Republic of Kazakhstan.

== List of ministers ==
Since the formation of the modern Ministry in 2023:

- Nurjan Nurjigitov (4 September 2023 – present)

== See also ==
- Ministry of Ecology and Natural Resources (Kazakhstan)
- Government of Kazakhstan
