= Kazakhstan Judo Federation =

Judo federation

Kazakhstan Judo Federation Қазақстан дзюдо федерациясы
- Sport: Judo
- Jurisdiction: Kazakhstan
- Abbreviation: KJF
- Founded: 1973
- Affiliation: IJF
- Headquarters: 18, Turan avenue, Nur-Sultan
- President: Kuanyshbek Yessekeev

Official website
- www.fdk.kz
- (Kazakhstan)

The Kazakhstan Judo Federation (KJF; Kazakh: Қазақстан дзюдо федерациясы, romanized: Qazaqstan Dziudo Federatsiiasy; ) is the governing body for the sport of judo in Kazakhstan.

== History ==
The Judo Federation in Kazakhstan was established in 1973. The beginning of the second stage of judo development is connected with Kazakhstan’s sovereignty, when we first had an opportunity to represent a country at official international tournaments as a separate National picked team.

Year 1993 became a remarkable date in the chronicle of Kazakhstan’s judo development. Participating in the Asia (Macao) championship for the first time, the national men’s team took 2 place, yielding to one of the strongest teams of the World – Japan picked team.

In 1993-94, 6 members of the National team were awarded the title of International Sports master. In 2004, Almaty hosted the first championship of Asia. Judo sportsmen of Kazakhstan won glorious victories over traditionally strong sportsmen of the Asian continent. Askhat Zhitkeyev ( -100), Muratbek Kipshakbayev (66) and Donbai Bazarbek (60) won golden medals.

Nowadays one of the priority tasks of the Authorities of the Judo Federation of the Republic of Kazakhstan is development of club judo, as is common in the world practice. Among the pioneers there are clubs «Lashyn» and «Arlan» in Almaty, «Yenbek» and «Judo Asia» in Karagandy. For 2011, it was planned to hold the first judo club championship of Kazakhstan.
