= Saiasat Nurbek =

Kazakh politician (born 1981)

- Саясат Нұрбек
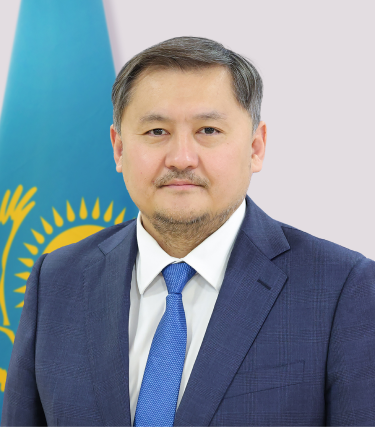
- Official portrait, 2025

Minister of Science and Higher Education
- Incumbent
- Assumed office 11 June 2022; Acting: 5 – 6 February 2024
- President: Kassym-Jomart Tokayev
- Prime Minister: Älihan Smaiylov; Roman Sklyar (acting); Oljas Bektenov
- Preceded by: Office established

Member of the Mäjilis
- In office 25 February 2022 – 14 June 2022

Member of the National Council of Public Trust
- In office 17 July 2019 – 15 June 2022
- President: Kassym-Jomart Tokayev

Personal details
- Born: 18 May 1981 (age 45) Semipalatinsk, Kazakh SSR, Soviet Union (now Semey, Kazakhstan)
- Party: Amanat
- Children: 3
- Education: Marshalltown Community College; L. N. Gumilev Eurasian National University
- Awards: Order of Kurmet; Medal for Distinguished Labor; Medal "20 Years of Independence of the Republic of Kazakhstan"; Medal "20 years of Astana"; Medal "25 Years of the Assembly of the People of Kazakhstan"; Medal "30 Years of Independence of the Republic of Kazakhstan"
- Website: sayasatnurbek.com

Saiasat Nurbek (Kazakh: Саясат Нұрбек, romanized: Saiiasat Nūrbek; born 18 May 1981) is a Kazakh politician who is serving as Minister of Science and Higher Education of the Republic of Kazakhstan since 11 June 2022.

== Biography ==
Born in the city of Semipalatinsk (now Semei), Nurbek graduated from Marshalltown Community College with a degree in political science. In 2004, he graduated from the Eurasian National University named after L. N. Gumilyov (ENU), and later earned a master's degree from the University of La Sapienza.

Nurbek began his career with international exposure as a campaign aide to Iowa congressman Mark Smith and U.S. presidential candidate Al Gore, as well as serving as an adviser to the Iowa government's Information and Accountability Department from 2000 to 2002.

From 2002 to 2006, he was a lecturer at ENU, head of the department of the Youth Congress of Kazakhstan, and director of Art-Motion LLP. From November 2006 to February 2008, he served as manager, chief manager, and advisor to the chairman of the management board of Kazyna FUR JSC.

In 2008, Nurbek held multiple positions: head of the Sector of the Personnel Policy Department of the Administration of the President, and vice-rector for International Cooperation of the Academy of Public Administration under the president. From 2008 to 2009, he was executive director for Human Resources Management at Samruk-Kazyna JSC.

From September 2009 to October 2010, he served as director of the National School of Public Policy at the Academy of Public Administration. From November 2010 to September 2013, he was president of the Center for International Programs, and from September 2013 to August 2015, director of the Institute for Public Policy. Between September 2015 and June 2016, he was head of the Internal Policy Department of the Akimat of Almaty.

From July 2016 to November 2017, Nurbek was managing director and member of the board of the Astana International Financial Centre. Since December 2017, he has served as a Goodwill Ambassador of National Geographic Kazakhstan. From August 2018 to October 2019, he led educational projects at BTSDigital, and from October 2019 to February 2022, he was CEO of BTS Education.

From 17 July 2019, he has been a member of the National Council of Public Trust under the President of Kazakhstan.

From 25 February 2022 to 11 June 2022, he was a deputy of the Mäjilis of the Parliament on the party list of Nur Otan (renamed Amanat on 1 March 2022).

On 11 June 2022, Nurbek was appointed Minister of Science and Higher Education of Kazakhstan, and was reappointed on 4 April 2023 and 6 February 2024.

== Awards ==
- Order of Kurmet (2021)
- Medal for Distinguished Labor (2021)
- Medal "20 Years of Independence of the Republic of Kazakhstan" (2011);
- Medal "20 years of Astana" (2018);
- Medal "25 Years of the Assembly of the People of Kazakhstan" (2020);
- Medal "30 Years of Independence of the Republic of Kazakhstan" (2021);
