= Ministry of Artificial Intelligence and Digital Development =

Government ministry of Kazakhstan

Ministry of Artificial Intelligence and Digital Development of the Republic of Kazakhstan
- Қазақстан Республикасының Жасанды интеллект және цифрлық даму министрлігі (Kazakh)
- Emblem of Kazakhstan

Agency overview
- Formed: 28 September 2025
- Jurisdiction: Government of Kazakhstan
- Headquarters: 55/14 С 2.4 Mangilik El Avenue, 14 House of Ministries, Astana 010000, Kazakhstan; 51°07′41″N 71°25′50″E
- Minister responsible: Jaslan Mädiev, Minister of Artificial Intelligence and Digital Development
- Website: www.gov.kz/memleket/entities/maidd

The Ministry of Artificial Intelligence and Digital Development of the Republic of Kazakhstan (MAIDD RK, Kazakh: Қазақстан Республикасының Жасанды интеллект және цифрлық даму министрлігі, romanized: Qazaqstan Respwblïkasınıñ Jasandı ïntellekt jäne cïfrlıq damw mïnïstrligi, ҚР ЖИЦДМ МИИЦР РК) is a central executive body of the Government of Kazakhstan, established in 2025.

== History ==
On 18 September 2025, the President of the Republic of Kazakhstan issued a decree establishing the ministry.

== List of ministers ==
Deputy Prime Minister — Minister of Artificial Intelligence and Digital Development

- Jaslan Mädiev (28 September 2025 – present)

== See also ==
- Government of Kazakhstan
