= Mädi Takiev =

Kazakh politician and lawyer

- Мәди Такиев
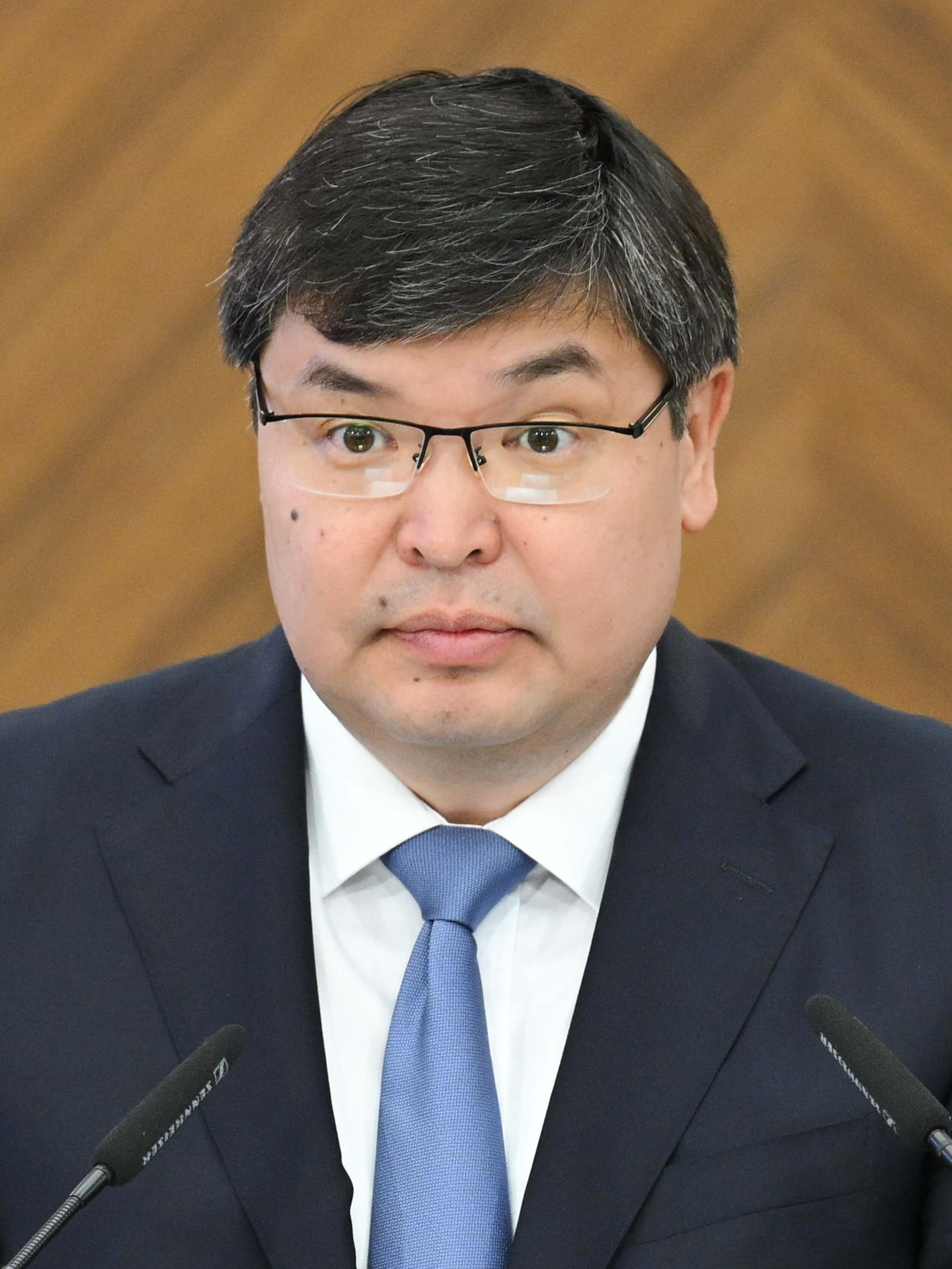
- Takiev in 2024

Minister of Finance
- Incumbent
- Assumed office 6 February 2024
- President: Kassym-Jomart Tokayev
- Prime Minister: Oljas Bektenov
- Preceded by: Erulan Jamaubaev

Member of the Mäjilis
- In office 28 March 2023 – 14 February 2024
- Constituency: Amanat Party List

Personal details
- Born: 1 April 1978 (age 48) Bakanas, Almaty Region, Kazakh SSR, Soviet Union
- Party: Amanat
- Children: 3
- Education: Kazakh State Academy of Management; Kunaev University; University of International Business and Economics
- Awards: Medal "20 Years of Independence of the Republic of Kazakhstan"; Medal for Distinguished Labor; Order of Kurmet

Mädi Tökeşuly Takiev (Note: Often transliterated as Мади Токешович Такиев through a Russified Romanization of Madi Tokeshovich Takiyev.) (Kazakh: Мәди Төкешұлы Тәкиев; born 1 April 1978) is a Kazakh politician and lawyer who is serving as Minister of Finance of the Republic of Kazakhstan since 6 February 2024.

== Biography ==
Takiev was born on 1 April 1978 in Bakanas, located in Balkhash District of Almaty Region. In 1998, he graduated from the Kazakh State Academy of Management with a degree in Accounting and Audit. He later obtained a law degree from D. A. Kunaev University of the Humanities in 2005. In 2011, he completed a Master of Business Administration program at the University of International Business.

He began his professional career in 1998 as chief accountant at the Institute of State and Law of the Ministry of Science — Academy of Sciences of the Republic of Kazakhstan. From 2000 to 2008, he worked within the tax authorities in Almaty, serving as inspector, senior inspector, chief tax inspector, and later as head of departments responsible for small and medium-sized enterprise oversight and tax audits. In 2008, he was appointed head of the Excise Administration Department of the Tax Department of Almaty Region, a position he held until 2009.

Between 2009 and 2012, Takiev served as deputy head of the Tax Department in Almaty. From 2012 to 2013, he headed a department within the Tax Committee of the Ministry of Finance of the Republic of Kazakhstan. In 2013, he was appointed director of the Department of Tax and Customs Policy at the Ministry of National Economy, a role he held until 2014. That same year, he worked as chief consultant of the Socio-Economic Department of the Office of the Prime Minister of the Republic of Kazakhstan.

From 2014 to 2017, Takiev headed the State Revenue Department in Atyrau Region. He subsequently served as director of the Tax Control Department of the State Revenue Committee of the Ministry of Finance from 2017 to 2019. On 12 March 2019, he was appointed Vice Minister of National Economy of the Republic of Kazakhstan, serving in this role until 24 September 2020.

From 24 September 2020 to 28 March 2023, he headed the Department of Socio-Economic Monitoring of the Presidential Administration of the Republic of Kazakhstan.

In March 2023, Takiev was elected as a deputy of the Mäjilis of the Parliament of the Republic of Kazakhstan of the 8th convocation from the Amanat party list, where he chaired the Finance and Budget Committee.

On 6 February 2024, he was appointed Minister of Finance of the Republic of Kazakhstan.

== Awards ==
- Medal "20 Years of Independence of the Republic of Kazakhstan"
- Medal for Distinguished Labor
- Order of Kurmet
