= Ministry of Science and Higher Education (Kazakhstan) =

Ministry of Science and Higher Education of the Republic of Kazakhstan
- Қазақстан Республикасы Ғылым және жоғары білім министрлігі (Kazakh); Министерство науки и высшего образования Республики Казахстан (Russian)
- Emblem of Kazakhstan

Agency overview
- Formed: 11 June 2022
- Preceding agency: Ministry of Education and Science
- Jurisdiction: Government of Kazakhstan
- Headquarters: 8 Mangilik El Avenue, House of Ministries, Entrance 11, Astana 010000, Kazakhstan; 51°07′26″N 71°26′21″E
- Minister responsible: Saiasat Nurbek, Minister of Education
- Website: www.gov.kz/memleket/entities/sci

The Ministry of Science and Higher Education of the Republic of Kazakhstan (MSHE RK; Kazakh: Қазақстан Республикасы Ғылым және жоғары білім министрлігі, ҚР ҒЖБМ; Russian: Министерство науки и высшего образования Республики Казахстан, МНВО РК) is a ministry of the Government of Kazakhstan responsible for higher and postgraduate education, language policy, science, digitalization of scientific activity, and quality assurance in these fields.

== History ==
The Ministry of Science and Higher Education traces its origins to February 1992, when the Ministry of Science and New Technologies was established within the government. In March 1996, it merged with the National Academy of Sciences of the Republic of Kazakhstan and the Kazakh Academy of Agricultural Sciences to form the Ministry of Science – the Academy of Sciences. In January 1999, the Ministry of Science and Higher Education was created, alongside the re-establishment of the National Academy of Sciences of the Republic of Kazakhstan. Later that year, in October 1999, the Ministry of Education, Health and Sports merged with the Ministry of Science and Higher Education to form the Ministry of Education and Science, with certain responsibilities transferred to the Agency for Health Affairs, the Agency for Tourism and Sports, and the Ministry of Energy, Industry, and Trade.

At a session dedicated to the anniversary of the National Academy of Sciences in Almaty on 1 June 2022, President Kassym-Jomart Tokayev proposed reorganising the Ministry of Education and Science into two separate bodies, highlighting the need to strengthen scientific coordination and improve the quality of Kazakhstani research publications.

On 11 June 2022, this proposal was formalised by presidential decree, creating the Ministry of Science and Higher Education. The new ministry assumed responsibility for higher and postgraduate education, scientific research, language policy, and quality assurance in science, while the Ministry of Education took charge of preschool, secondary, technical, and vocational education, as well as child-rights protection. Saiasat Nurbek was appointed as the first minister of the Ministry of Science and Higher Education.

== Structure ==
=== Committees ===
- Committee for Higher and Postgraduate Education
- Committee for Quality Assurance in Science and Higher Education
- Committee of Science
- Language Policy Committee

=== Organizations ===
- National Center for the Development of Higher Education (RSE on the right of economic management)
- National Testing Center (RSPE)
- Memorial Museum of Academician K. I. Satpayev (RSI)
- Institute of State History (RSI)
- Ulytau Technical University (RSE on the right of economic management)

== Objectives ==
1. formation and implementation of a unified state policy, implementation of intersectoral coordination in the field of higher and postgraduate education, scientific and scientific and technical activities, commercialization of the results of scientific and (or) scientific and technical activities, as well as in the field of language development, development and implementation of international programs in the field of higher and postgraduate education and science;
2. creation of the necessary conditions for obtaining higher and (or) postgraduate education;
3. improving the organization of scientific research and increasing its competitiveness;
4. creation of conditions for the commercialization of the results of scientific and (or) scientific and technical activities.

== List of ministers ==
- Saiasat Nurbek (11 June 2022 – present)

== See also ==
- Ministry of Education and Science (Kazakhstan)
- Ministry of Education (Kazakhstan)
- Government of Kazakhstan
