= Government of Kazakhstan =

National government

- Қазақстан Республикасының Үкіметі
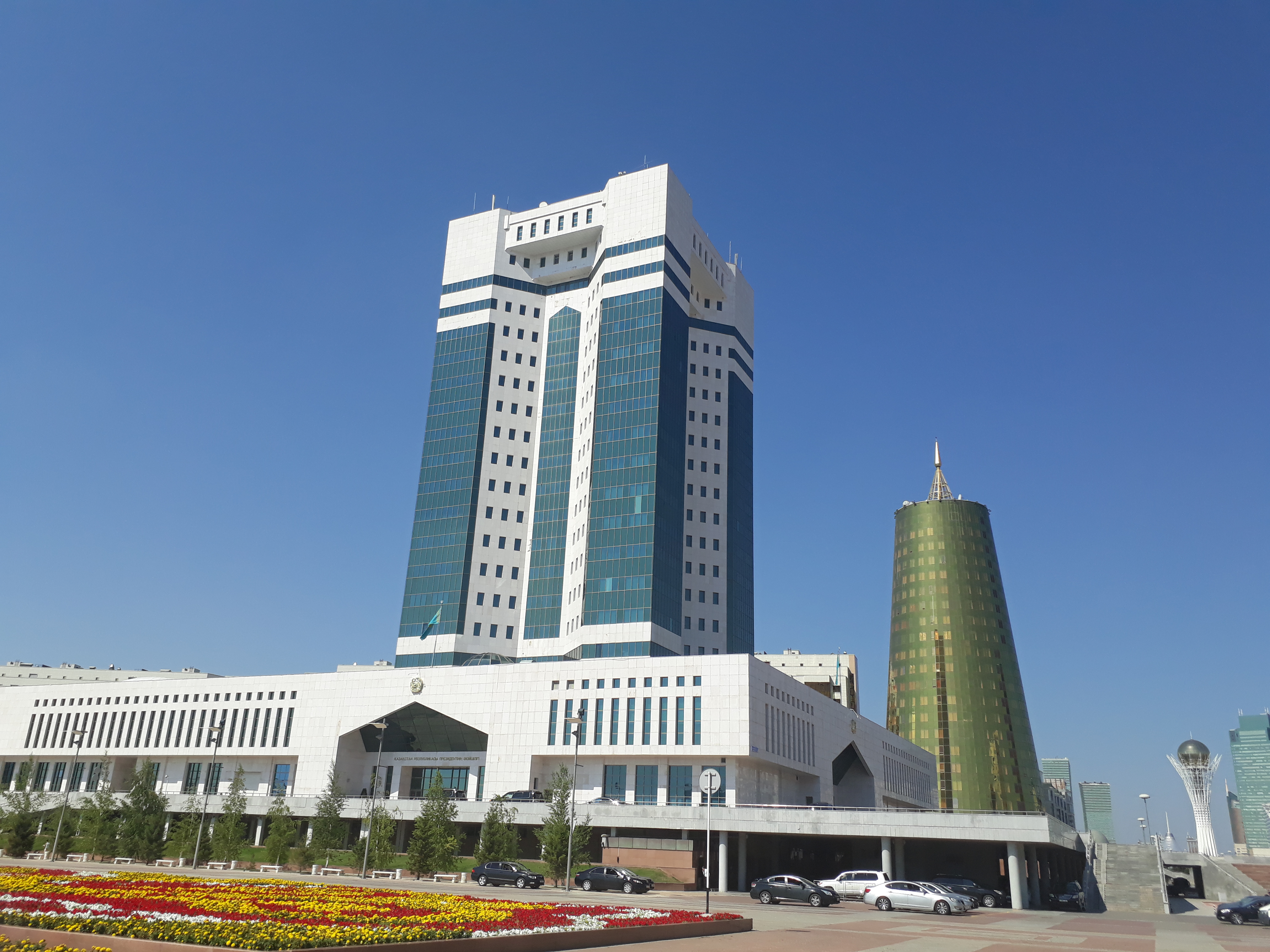
- Seat of the Government of Kazakhstan in Astana

Overview
- Established: 18 December 1995 (current form)
- State: Kazakhstan
- Leader: Prime Minister
- Appointed by: President
- Main organ: Council of Ministers
- Responsible to: President
- Headquarters: Astana, Kazakhstan
- Website: government.kz

The Government of the Republic of Kazakhstan (Kazakh: Қазақстан Республикасының Үкіметі, Qazaqstan Respublikasynyñ Ükımetı) is the collegial body that exercises executive power in the Republic of Kazakhstan; the government heads the system of executive bodies and directs their activities. The Government is formed by the President of Kazakhstan in the manner prescribed by the constitution. The current cabinet is headed by Oljas Bektenov, who was sworn in as Prime Minister on 6 February 2024. The Government House is located on the left bank near Akorda at the House of Ministries at Mangilik el 8 ave in Astana. The length of the building is about 1.5 km. It consists of 20 blocks and has a stepped shape – from 8 to 10 floors. The total area of the facility is 228 thousand square meters. The outer walls are monolithic reinforced concrete, the finish is ceramic granite.

== History ==
During the existence of the Soviet Union, of which Kazakhstan was a constituent republic, the executive branch of the Kazakh Soviet Socialist Republic was the Council of Ministers of the Kazakh SSR On August 30, 1995, a referendum was held on the adoption of a new Constitution of the country. The new basic law of the country laid the foundation for the creation of state bodies of independent Kazakhstan. Thus, after the referendum, in order to ensure the implementation of the norms of the Constitution and the activities of new state bodies, a number of constitutional laws were adopted regulating their powers and functions. For example, the Constitutional Law "On Elections in the Republic of Kazakhstan", the Constitutional Law "On the President of the Republic of Kazakhstan", the Constitutional Law "On the Parliament of the Republic of Kazakhstan and the Status of its Deputies", including the Constitutional Law "On the Government of the Republic of Kazakhstan" it was adopted on December 18, 1995. On February 21, the President of Kazakhstan dissolved the government.

On January 5, 2022, amid protests, the President of Kazakhstan Kassym-Jomart Tokayev dismissed the government of Askar Mamin, and Alikhan Askhanovich Smailov was appointed acting Prime Minister.

On February 5, 2024, the President of Kazakhstan Kassym-Jomart Tokayev accepted the resignation of the government headed by Alikhan Smailov. On February 6, a new cabinet of ministers was formed under the chairmanship of Olzhas Bektenov.

== Powers and responsibilities ==
The Government of the Republic of Kazakhstan performs the following functions:

- Develops the main directions of the socio-economic policy of the state, its defense capability, security, public order and organizes their implementation;
- Develops and submits to the Parliament the republican budget and a report on its execution, ensures the execution of the budget;
- Submits draft laws to the Majilis and ensures the execution of laws;
- Organizes the management of state property;
- Develops measures to implement the foreign policy of the Republic;
- Manages the activities of ministries, state committees, other central and local executive bodies;
- Cancels or suspends in whole or in part the effect of acts of ministries, state committees, other central and local executive bodies of the Republic;
- Appoints to office and dismisses from office the heads of central executive bodies that are not part of the Government;
- Appoints four members of the Accounts Committee for Control over the Execution of the Republican Budget for a five-year term;
- Performs other functions assigned to it by the Constitution, laws and acts of the President.

== Structure ==
The government heads the system of executive bodies of power and manages their activities. The government is a collegial body formed by the President of Kazakhstan and consists of the Prime Minister, his deputies, ministers and other officials of the Republic. The head of the government – the Prime Minister is appointed by the President of Kazakhstan with the consent of the Mazhilis of the Parliament (lower house). Ministers are appointed by the President, with the consent of the relevant committee of the Parliament of the Republic.

The structure of the government is formed by ministries and other central executive bodies of the republic. The latter include central executive bodies of power that are not part of the Government. Thus, if the composition of the Government is formed by officials heading the relevant executive bodies, then the structure of the government is formed by state bodies. The Government in all its activities is responsible to the President of Kazakhstan, and in some cases, to Parliament.

Proposals on the structure and composition of the Government are submitted to the President by the Prime Minister within 10 days after the latter's appointment.

Meetings of the Government are held at least once a month and are convened by the Prime Minister or the President of the Republic.

=== Prime minister ===
The prime minister, who serves at the pleasure of the president, chairs the Council of Ministers and serves as Kazakhstan's head of government. There are three deputy prime ministers and 17 ministers in the government. The most recent Prime Minister of Kazakhstan is Oljas Bektenov.

=== Agencies and committees ===
Kazakhstan's National Security Committee (NSC) was established on 13 June 1992. It includes the Service of Internal Security, Military Counterintelligence, Border Guard, several Commandos units, and Foreign Intelligence (Barlau). The latter is considered by many as the most important part of NSC. Penitentiary Service Committee is a part of the Ministry of Internal Affairs.

== See also ==
- Monthly calculation index
