= Family of Nursultan Nazarbayev =

Immediate family of the President of Kazakhstan

- Current region: Kazakhstan
- Titles: List: President of Kazakhstan; First Lady of Kazakhstan; Nur Otan Chairman; Asar Chairwoman; Senate Chairwoman; KazTransGas Chairman; KazTransOil Chairman
- Members: Nursultan Nazarbayev; Sara Nazarbayeva; Dariga Nazarbayeva; Dinara Kulibaeva; Aliya Nazarbayeva; Aisultan Nazarbayev
- Connected members: Rakhat Aliyev; Timur Kulibayev; Qairat Boranbaev

The family of Nursultan Nazarbayev, 1st President of Kazakhstan (1991–2019) and Security Council Chairman (1991–2022), includes members prominent in politics, business, entertainment, education, art, and others. Described to have collected wealth and power through nepotism and corruption, the family is the most influential one in the country. The family is sometimes referred to as the Nazarbayev dynasty.

The family was especially influential during the entirety of Nursultan Nazarbayev's authoritarian rule and the first years of the Tokayev presidency. After the 2022 Kazakh unrest, the dynasty, including Nazarbayev himself, who lost the title Elbasy, and other connected members of the family, lost their government positions and titles. Radio Free Europe, however, reported that the family still has political influence to this day.

In 2024, Timur and Dinara Kulibayev, Dariga and Nurbol Nazarbayev and Nurali Aliyev were among the 75 wealthiest people in Kazakhstan.

== Immediate family ==
=== Spouses ===
==== Sara Nazarbayeva ====
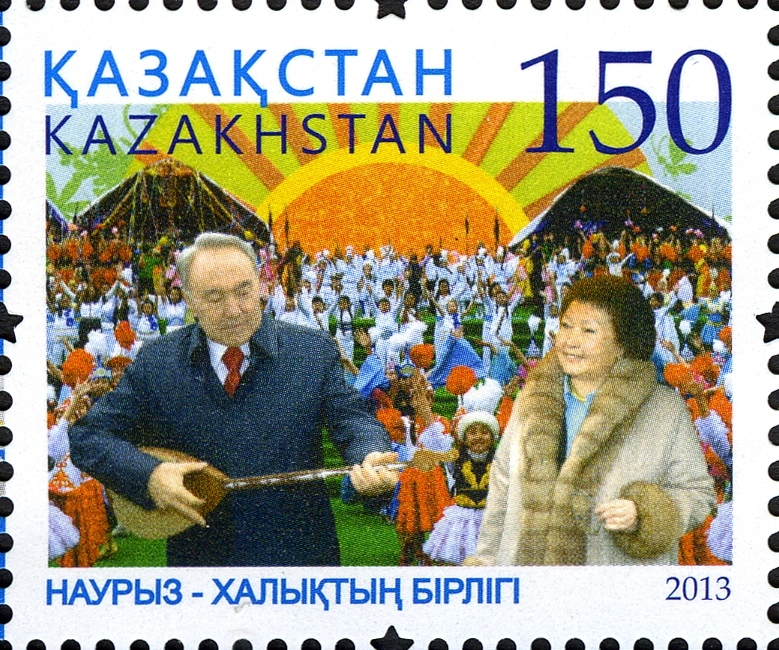
Sara and Nursultan Nazarbayev featured on a stamp, 2013

Sara Nazarbayeva, the first and the only legal (Note: According to Kazakh law, polygamy is illegal.) wife of Nursultan Nazarbayev, was born on 12 February 1941 in Karaganda Region. Before her marriage to Nazarbayev on 25 August 1962, she was a metallurgist at the Karaganda Metallurgical Plant.

During her tenure as the First Lady of Kazakhstan, Sara Nazarbayeva held the titles of the president of the "Böbek" Republican Children's Charity Fund and honorary professor at the Al-Farabi Kazakh National University, and was awarded Order of Friendship, 1st class.

In 2023, rumours surfaced that the Nazarbayevs divorced, as information appeared stating that Sara Nazarbayeva changed her surname to her birth surname. This point was especially pushed as she was now not in the public spotlight and her sole proprietorship was now attributed to "Sara Konakayeva". The official website of Nursultan Nazarbayev, however, stated that she remains his only legal spouse.

==== Gülnar Raqyşeva ====
According to different sources, including Radio Free Europe and Rakhat Aliyev's book Godfather-in-law, Gülnar Raqyşeva (Note: Kazakh: Гүлнар Оразқызы Рақышева, Russian: Гульнар Ракишева, Gulnar Rakisheva) was the second, unofficial wife of Nursultan Nazarbayev. This information was neither denied, nor confirmed officially.

The extra-marital affairs of Nazarbayev with Gülnar Raqyşeva were first mentioned in Nazarbayev's son-in-law Rakhat Aliyev's book Godfather-in-law. Raqyşeva, a former flight attendant, is said to have left her job after her affair with Nazarbayev began, and has shortly been elevated to the position of Air Astana Vice President. The career of Raqyşeva's father, Oraz Raqyşev, has also substantially grown since then.

Gülnar Raqyşeva was born on 2 March 1970 in Tula, Soviet Russia. Her father Oraz Raqyşev was doing military service there at the time. From 1981 to 1986, Raqyşev and his family were sent to Hungary, and thus Raqyşeva attended school in Mór. As of now, Gülnar Raqyşeva is the owner of the "FIRMA CHARMES" company, which has 40 locations. In 2023, the company was circulating 100 million tenge. Raqyşeva is also the co-chairperson of the "Sergio Group" and "My Service" companies, the owner of the "Barys" charity. In 2023, the annual income of "Sergio Group" was valued to be around 4–6 billion tenge.

Rakhat Aliyev also reported that Raqyşeva gave birth to two daughters to Nazarbayev and now lives in Spain. However, her social media accounts list her as living in either Almaty or Astana. In 2023, Raqyşeva seemed to have denied having an affair with Nazarbayev.

==== Äsel Qurmanbaeva ====
Äsel Qurmanbaeva (Note: Kazakh: Әсел Тілектесқызы Құрманбаева, Russian: Асель Курманбаева, Assel Kurmanbayeva) (née Isabayeva) is said to be the third wife of Nursultan Nazarbayev. Qurmanbaeva, the affair with whom is confirmed by Nazarbayev himself, was born in 1981 in Almaty. Her father Tilektes Esbolov has been leading the Almaty Agrarian University for two decades. Qurmanbaeva, who studied to be a choreographer, was once titled Miss Kazakhstan.

It was reported in 2024 that Qurmanbaeva, who only worked as art director in the Astana Ballet Theatre, owned a three-room apartment in Palm Jumeirah, Dubai, which was valued starting from 2 million dollars. She was also internationally listed to have received 30 million dollars through offshore companies.

In his "My Life" 2023 memoire, Nazarbayev admitted to have had an affair with Qurmanbaeva. He also wrote that they have two sons, Tauman (born 2005) and Bäiken (born 2008). It was said that the wedding was done according to Islamic traditions.

=== Children ===
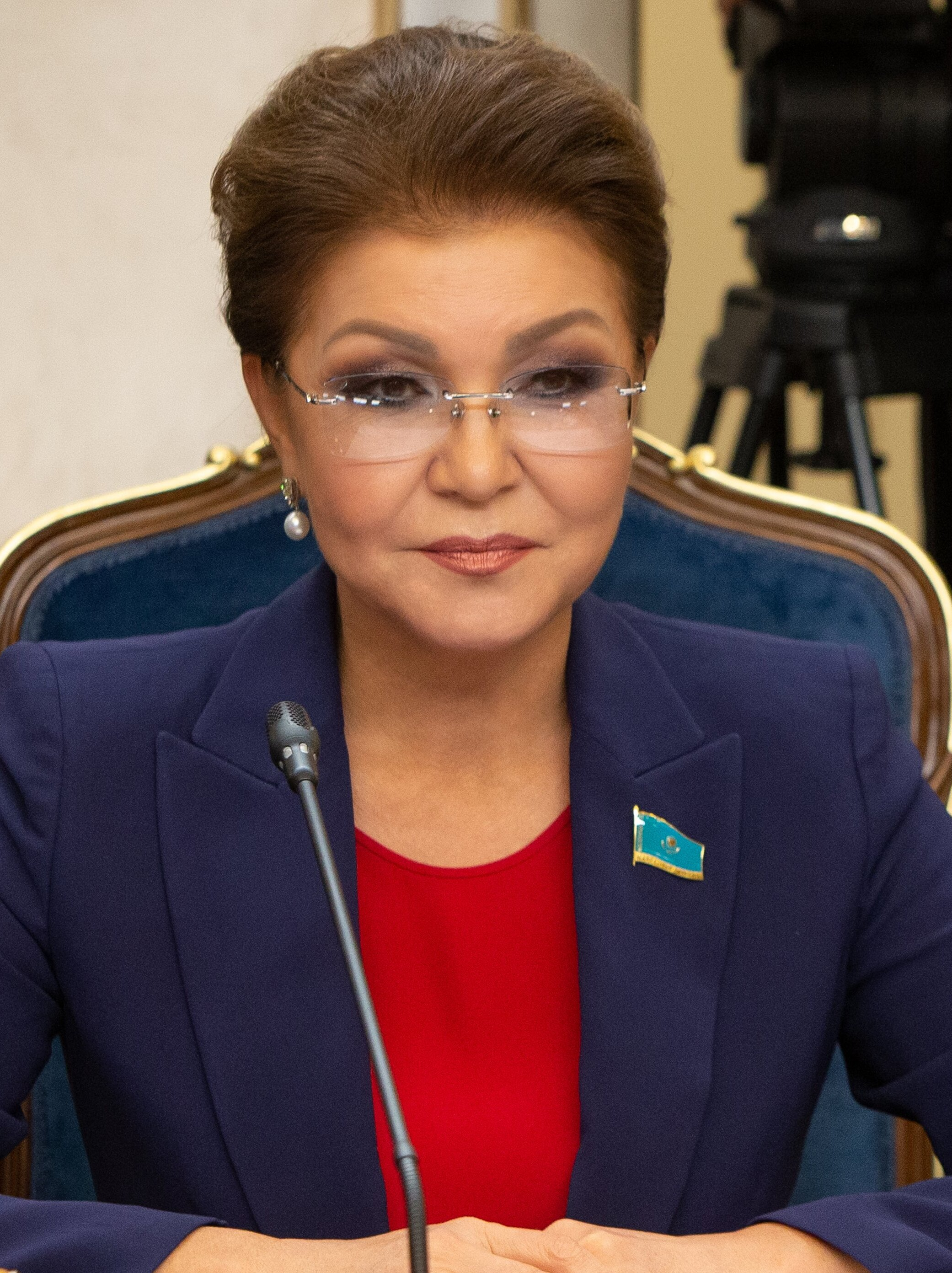
Nazarbayev's eldest daughter Dariga Nazarbayeva, 2019

Nursultan Nazarbayev officially has three daughters from Sara Nazarbayeva and two sons from his unofficial marriage to Äsel Qurmanbaeva. According to Rakhat Aliyev, he also has two daughters from his affair with Gülnar Raqyşeva.

==== Children from Sara Nazarbayeva ====
===== Dariga Nazarbayeva =====
Born on May 7, 1963, Dariga Nazarbayeva is a former politician, who held such government positions as Deputy Prime Minister, Senator, Senate Chairwoman, and Leader of the Nur Otan faction in the Mäjilis. The eldest daughter of Nazarbayev, she was documented in the Panama Papers as having several offshore entities.

===== Dinara Kulibaeva =====
Born on August 19, 1967, Dinara Kulibaeva (née Nazarbayeva) is the second daughter and middle child of Nursultan and Sara Nazarbayev.

De facto chairpersons of Halyk Bank, Dinara Kulibaeva and her husband Timur Kulibayev's joint wealth was valued to be 5 billion dollars in 2024. She, together with Kulibayev, is the second-richest person in Kazakhstan. Kulibaeva is the only Central Asian woman to ever be featured in the Forbes World's Richest People list.

===== Aliya Nazarbayeva =====
Born 3 February 1980 in Almaty, Aliya Nazarbayeva is Nursultan and Sara Nazarbayevs' youngest daughter.

==== Children from Gülnar Raqyşeva ====
Nursultan Nazarbayev's former son-in-law Rakhat Aliyev reported that Nursultan Nazarbayev has two daughters from his extra-marital affair with Gülnar Raqyşeva. He has also stated that the three live in Spain.

==== Children from Äsel Qurmanbaeva ====
In his 2023 memoire "My Life", Nursultan Nazarbayev admits that he has two sons from his second unofficial marriage to Äsel Qurmanbaeva, Tauman (born 2005) and Bäiken (born 2008).

Tauman Nursultanuly was born on April 6, 2005. In April 2023, Tauman married Energy Minister Almasadam Sätqaliev's daughter Anadelya Maydanova. Baiken Nazarbayev was born on December 5, 2008.

=== Grandchildren ===
Nursultan Nazarbayev is known to have 10 grandchildren, all born from daughters: Dariga's 3 children, Dinara's 3 children, and Aliya's 4 children. Below are the most notable of them:

==== Nurali Aliyev ====
Nurali Rahatuly Aliyev is an entrepreneur. The eldest son of Rakhat Aliyev and Dariga Nazarbayeva, he is therefore Nazarbayev's eldest grandchild. Nurali Aliyev is married and has four children.

Despite the decline of the Nazarbayev clan's political influence after the 2022 Kazakh unrest, Nurali Aliyev was appointed Chairman of Transtelecom in 2023.

==== Aisultan Nazarbayev ====
Born on August 26, 1990, Aisultan Nazarbayev was a football player and entrepreneur. According to his official biography, Aisultan is Nursultan Nazarbayev's grandchild, and second son of Rakhat Aliyev and Dariga Nazarbayev. In his later years, Aisultan posted numerous times on social media that his actual father is Nursultan Nazarbayev himself and that his life is in danger. DNA results stating that his father is Rakhat Aliyev were found to be fabricated and thus his true biological parents are unknown.

Aisultan Nazarbayev passed away in London on August 16, 2020. A British coroner reported that he died of natural causes, which were related to his drug addiction.

==== Venera Nazarbayeva ====
Born on October 24, 1995, Venera Nazarbayeva is the youngest child and only daughter of Rakhat Aliyev and Dariga Nazarbayeva. In 2018, she married into the Shaizhunussov dynasty.

== Ancestry ==
Nursultan Nazarbayev belongs to the Şapyraşty clan of the Senior jüz. His ancestry goes in this order: Nursultan, Äbiş, Nazarbay, Köşek, Qarasay, Esqoja, Şapyraşty.

Nursultan Nazarbayev's father Äbiş and mother Äljan Buqarbaiqyzy (née Jatqanbaeva) were farmers. Äbiş could not serve in the military after suffering an injury on his arm while extinguishing a fire. At the end of World War II, the family returned to Shamalgan. Nazarbayev started going to school in 1948, where he learned Russian; at the time, he lived with his maternal grandfather as his parents did not have property there at the time. Afterwards, Nazarbayev moved to the higher part of Shamalgan, where, after mastering Russian, he could interact with the ethnically Russian majority.

=== Siblings ===
==== Satybaldy Nazarbayev ====
Satybaldy Nazarbayev was married to Svetlana Nazarbayeva. They had two children: Qairat Satybaldyuly and Samat Äbiş, both of whom went on to serve in different government positions.

==== Bolat Nazarbayev ====
Nazarbayev's younger brother Bolat Nazarbayev had numerous wives. The exact number of his wives and children is not known. His eldest wife was Güljan Nazarbayeva (née Aitmuhambetova; 1955 – 2020). Bolat and Güljan had three children: Gülmira, Qundyz and Nurbol.

Bolat Nazarbayev's harem included numerous women. The list of them and their children is this:

- Mayra Qurmanğalieva: Hanbolat;
- Gülnar Düisebaeva: Hantöre, Janel;
- Dinara Mametekova: Erkejan, Muhammed;
- Juldyz Taşova

After Bolat Nazarbayev's death, 14 of his children volunteered to share his will.

Bolat Nazarbayev, who was shown as a person of charity in state media, owned assets and bazaars. Officially, the exact sources of his immense wealth are unknown, though most sources agree that he gained access to much of his wealth through his brother Nursultan. Many sources also confirm that Bolat, who's a plumber and mechanic by profession, enriched himself through corporate raid.

==== Änipa Nazarbayeva ====
Nursultan Nazarbayeva's sister Änipa Nazarbayeva was, at some point, married. Her daughter Elmira is married to Azamat Jylqybaev.

== Corruption ==
The Nazarbayev dynasty has achieved immense wealth and political influence during the Nazarbayev presidency. Nursultan Nazarbayev's daughters and siblings were featured on Forbes, and have appropriated culturally important sights and bazaars to themselves, sometimes through corporate raid.

== Summary table ==
Birth	Death	Image	Name	Relationship to Nazarbayev	Office	Occupation	Ref.
1903	1971		Äbiş Nazarbayev	Father of Nursultan Nazarbayev		farmer	
1910	1977		Äljan Nazarbayeva	Mother of Nursultan Nazarbayev		farmer	
1940			Nursultan Nazarbayev	Himself	President of Kazakhstan (1991–2019); Elbasy (2010–2022); Security Council Chairman (1991–2022)	metallurgist	
1947	1981		Satybaldy Nazarbayev	Younger brother of Nursultan Nazarbayev	—		
1950			Änipa Nazarbayeva	Younger sister of Nursultan Nazarbayev	«Kenjehan», «Kenjehan-2» Bazaar Founder		
1953	2023		Bolat Nazarbayev	Younger brother of Nursultan Nazarbayev	—	mechanic, plumber, lawyer	
1941			Sara Nazarbayeva	First wife of Nursultan Nazarbayev	First Lady of Kazakhstan (1991–2019)	metallurgist	
1970			Gülnar Raqyşeva	"Second" wife of Nursultan Nazarbayev (Note: Nazarbayev's extra-marital affair with Gülnar Raqyşeva has not been officially proven)	Air Astana Vice President	flight attendant	
1980			Äsel Qurmanbaeva	Youngest wife of Nursultan Nazarbayev	Astana Ballet Theatre art-director	choreographer, Miss Kazakhstan	
1963			Dariga Nazarbayeva	First daughter of Nursultan Nazarbayev	Nursultan Nazarbayev Fund Director (since 2007); Deputy Prime Minister (2015–2016); Senator (2016–2020); Senate Chairwoman (2019–2020); Mäjilis Deputy (2004–2007; 2012–2015; 2021–2022)	historian, political scientist	
1967			Dinara Kulibaeva	Second daughter of Nursultan Nazarbayev	Nursultan Nazarbayev Knowledge Fund Founder and Director (2009 бастап)	economist, educator	
1980			Aliya Nazarbayeva	Youngest daughter of Nursultan Nazarbayev	"Jasyl El" Council Chairwoman (2021 бастап)	lawyer, economist, international relations, film producer	
1970			Qairat Satybaldyuly	Nephew of Nursultan Nazarbayev, son of Satybaldy Nazarbayev	Deputy Äkim of Astana (1998–2000); Nur Otan Secretary (2010–2015)		
1970			Samat Äbiş	Nephew of Nursultan Nazarbayev, son of Satybaldy Nazarbayev	National Security Committee Astana City Department Chairman, NSC Deputy Chief, First Deputy Chief (2011–2022)	lawyer	
1947	2024		Svetlana Nazarbayeva	Sister-in-law of Nursultan Nazarbayev, wife of Satybaldy Nazarbayev	Dauir Publishing Director	philologist	
1970			Nurbol Nazarbayev	Nephew of Nursultan Nazarbayev, son of Bolat Nazarbayev	Deputy Chief of the Almaty Region Internal Affairs Department (2014–2017)	lawyer	
2005			Tauman Nazarbayev	Son of Nursultan Nazarbayev			
2008			Bäiken Nazarbayev	Son of Nursultan Nazarbayev			
1962	2015		Rakhat Aliyev	Former son-in-law of Nursultan Nazarbayev, ex-husband of Dariga Nazarbayeva	State Security Service Deputy Chief (2001–2002); First Deputy Foreign Minister (2005–2007); Ambassador to Austria (2002–2005; 2007); National Olympic Committee Chairman (2002–2007)	surgeon, jurist, lawyer	
1963			Qairat Şäripbaev	Son-in-law of Nursultan Nazarbayev, husband of Dariga Nazarbayeva	QazTransGaz Directors' Council Chairman (2015–2020); QazTransGaz Administration Chairman (2014–2015, 2020–2022)	agronomist	
1966			Timur Kulibayev	Son-in-law of Nursultan Nazarbayev, husband of Dinara Kulibaeva	KazMunayGas First Vice President (2002–2005); Samruk, Samruk-Kazyna Deputy Administration Chief (2006–2011); Samruk-Kazyna Chief (2011); Atameken Presidium Chairman (2011–2022); National Olympic Committee Chairman (2015–2024)	economist	
1976	2020		Aidar Akayev	Former son-in-law of Nursultan Nazarbayev, ex-husband of Aliya Nazarbayeva	Bitel Chairman; Manas International Airport co-owner	politician, entrepreneur	
1981			Dimaş Dosanov	Son-in-law of Nursultan Nazarbayev, husband of Aliya Nazarbayeva	KazTransOil Chairman (2016–2022); Basketball Federation Chairman (2017–2021)	financier, administrator, international relations	
1985			Nurali Aliyev	Grandson of Nursultan Nazarbayev, son of Dariga Nazarbayeva	Deputy Äkim of Astana (2014–2016); Transtelecom President (2013–2014); Transtelecom Chairman of the Directors' Council (2016–2025)	entrepreneur, economist	
1990	2020		Aisultan Nazarbayev	Grandson of Nursultan Nazarbayev, son of Dariga Nazarbayeva (officially) (Note: In his later years, Aisultan claimed his biological father is Nursultan Nazarbayev. There is no document that would prove or disprove this claim, as the DNA results showing Rakhat Aliyev as his father have been fabricated.)		entrepreneur, economist	
1995			Venera Nazarbayeva	Granddaughter of Nursultan Nazarbayev, daughter of Dariga Nazarbayeva	—	—	

== See also ==
- Godfather-in-law
