= Nazarbayev (surname) =

Nazarbayev or Nazarbaev is the masculine form of a Kazakh surname. The feminine form of the surname is Nazarbayeva.

People with the surname include:

- Nursultan Nazarbayev (born 1940), former President of Kazakhstan
  - Sara Nazarbayeva (born 1941), wife of Nursultan and former First Lady of Kazakhstan
    - Dariga Nazarbayeva (born 1964), Kazakh politician, daughter of Nursultan and Sara Nazarbayev
      - Aisultan Nazarbayev (1990−2020), Kazakh football player, son of Dariga Nazarbayeva
    - Aliya Nazarbayeva (born 1980), Kazakh businesswoman, daughter of Nursultan and Sara Nazarbayev
