= D. Nazarbayeva =

D. Nazarbayeva may refer to:

- Dariga Nazarbayeva
- Dinara Nazarbayeva
