= Nazarbayev (disambiguation) =

Nursultan Nazarbayev was the 1st President of Kazakhstan.

Nazarbayev may also refer to:

- Nazarbayev (surname)
- Nazarbayev University, university in Nur-Sultan
- Nazarbayev Center, public institution in Kazakhstan
- Nursultan Nazarbayev International Airport
- Nazarbayev University Repository, institutional online archive
