= Berik Imashev =

Kazakh politician

- Берік Имашев
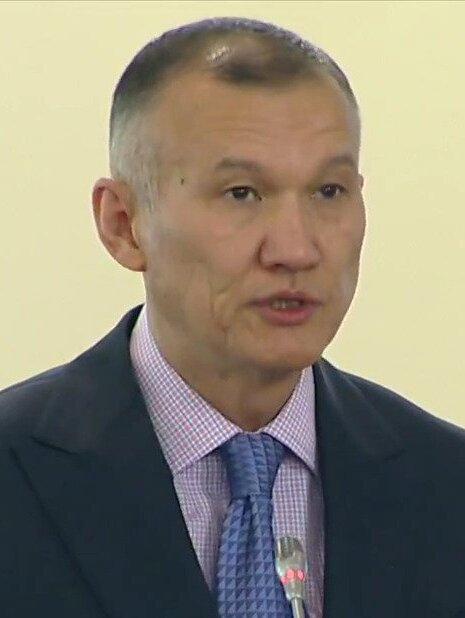
- Imashev in 2013

Chairman of the Central Election Commission
- In office 13 September 2016 – 25 January 2022
- President: Nursultan Nazarbayev; Kassym-Jomart Tokayev
- Preceded by: Quandyq Turganqulov
- Succeeded by: Nurlan Äbdirov

Minister of Justice
- In office 20 January 2012 – 13 September 2016
- President: Nursultan Nazarbayev
- Prime Minister: Karim Massimov; Serik Akhmetov; Bakhytzhan Sagintayev
- Preceded by: Rashid Tusupbekov
- Succeeded by: Marat Beketaev

Member of the Senate of Kazakhstan
- In office 23 November 2011 – 20 January 2012

Personal details
- Born: 7 June 1960 (age 66) Alma-Ata, Kazakh SSR, Soviet Union
- Spouse: Leila Adaibekova
- Children: 3
- Education: Moscow State University

Berık Mäjitūly İmaşev (Note: Often transliterated as Berik Mazhituly Imashev through a Russified Romanization of Берик Мажитулы Имашев.) (Kazakh: Берік Мәжитұлы Имашев; born 7 June 1960) is a Kazakh politician, who's currently serving as the Security Council Secretary of Kazakhstan. He previously served as a Minister of Justice between 2012 and 2016.

== Biography ==
- He was born in 1960, in Almaty. In 1982, he graduated from Lomonosov Moscow State University with a degree in law. After graduating, he worked as investigator at the prosecutor's office of the district, investigator for particularly important cases under the Prosecutor of the Kazakh SSR, prosecutor of the district, Department Head of State Prosecutor's Office of the Republic of Kazakhstan, First Deputy Prosecutor of Almaty.
- From 1994 to 1997 he worked as Deputy Chairman of “Kazkommertsbank”, Deputy Head of State Property Management Committee of the Republic of Kazakhstan, Head of Tax Police Board – Deputy Head of Tax Committee of the Republic of Kazakhstan. From May 1997 to April 1998 he ran a private legal company.
- He was an Aide of the President of the Republic of Kazakhstan and Head of the Agency on Small Business Support from 1998 to 1999.
- From 1999 to 2000 he served as Deputy Chairman of the Bar of Astana.
- He served as head of the Agency of the Republic of Kazakhstan for Regulation of Natural Monopolies, Protection of Competition and Small Business Support from 2000 to 2001.
- He was a President of CJSC “Neftekonsalting” from 2001 to 2003.
- From 2003 to 2005 he served as Deputy Security Council Secretary of the Republic of Kazakhstan.
- He was a Chairman of JSC “Fund for the Development of Small Business” from May to October 2005.
- In October 2005 he was nominated to be Deputy Head of the Administration of the President of Kazakhstan.
- In 1990, he was awarded a “Detection and Policy” Prize from Semenov International Fund, and two medals.

== Personal life ==
Imashev has three children, a daughter Aida (born 1984) who is married to the wealthy Nurali Aliyev, son of Rakhat Aliyev and Dariga Nazarbayeva, a son Alzhan (born 1987), and a daughter Adiya (born 1999).
