= Whisky priest =

Whisky priest or variants may refer to:

- Whisky priest, the unnamed protagonist in Graham Greene's The Power and the Glory
- Whisky priest, a stock character who shows clear signs of moral weakness while preaching of a higher standard and ultimately showing goodness on a broader level, named after Greene's character
- "The Whisky Priest", a 1982 episode of Yes Minister
- Whiskey Priest, a 2005 novel by Alexander J. Motyl

== See also ==
- Whisky
- Priest
