= Alexander J. Motyl =

American historian

Alexander John Motyl
- Олександр Джон Мотиль
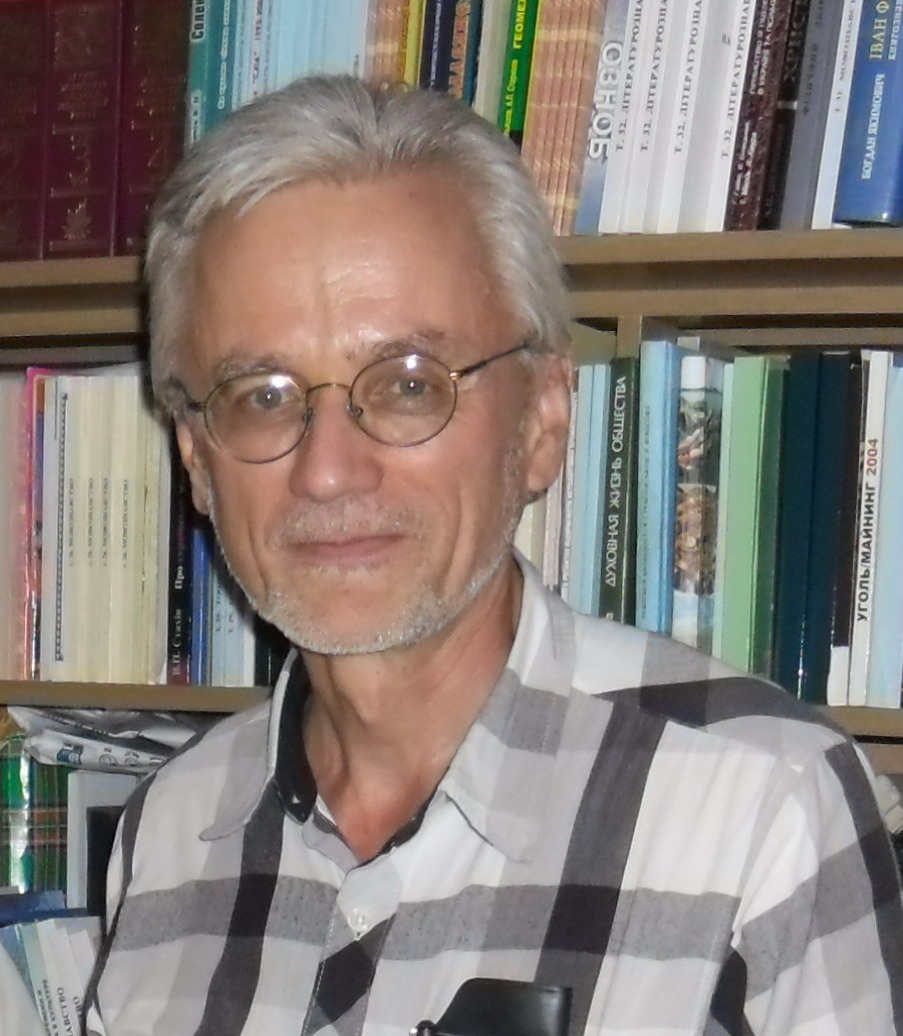
- Motyl at the Ukrainian cultural center in the library of the UKCentre, Donetsk, Ukraine in 2012
- Born: New York City, New York, United States
- Occupations: Historian, political scientist, poet, writer, translator, and painter

Alexander John Motyl (Note: Ukrainian: Олександр Джон Мотиль, romanized: Oleksandr Dzhon Motyl) is an American historian, political scientist, poet, writer, translator, and painter. He is a resident of New York City. He is professor of political science at Rutgers University in Newark, New Jersey, and a specialist on Ukraine, Russia, and the Soviet Union.

He also writes opinion columns in publications such as Foreign Policy, 19FortyFive, and The Kyiv Post.

== Life ==
Alexander John Motyl was born and raised in Ukrainian Village, Manhattan. Motyl's parents emigrated as refugees from Western Ukraine after World War II, when the region was occupied by the Soviet Union. He was born in New York City.

He graduated from Regis High School in New York City in 1971. He studied at Columbia University, graduating with a BA in history in 1975 and a Ph.D. in Political Science in 1984.

== Academic career ==
Motyl has taught at Columbia University, Lehigh University, the Ukrainian Free University, the Kyiv-Mohyla University, and Harvard University and is professor of political science at Rutgers University-Newark.

He is the author of eight academic books and editor or co-editor of over fifteen volumes. Motyl has written extensively on the Soviet Union, Ukraine, revolutions, nations and nationalism, and empires.

In Imperial Ends (2001), he posits a theoretical framework for examining the structure of empires as a political structure. Motyl describes three types of imperial structures: continuous, discontinuous, and hybrid. Motyl also posits varying degrees of empire: formal, informal, and hegemonic. He discusses the Russian example in an earlier book, The Post Soviet Nations.

== Other activities ==
Motyl is also active as a poet, a writer of fiction, and a visual artist. A collection of his poems have appeared in "Vanishing Points". His novels include Whiskey Priest (2005), Who Killed Andrei Warhol (2007), Flippancy (2009), The Jew Who Was Ukrainian, My Orchidia (2012), Sweet Snow (2013), Fall River, Vovochka (2015), Ardor (2016), A Russian in Berlin (2021), Pitun's Last Stand (2021) and Lowest East Side (2022). He has done readings of his fiction and poetry at New York's Cornelia Street Cafe and Bowery Poetry Club. Motyl has had one-man shows of his art in New York, Toronto, and Philadelphia. His artwork is part on the permanent collections of the Ukrainian Museum in New York City and the Ukrainian Cultural Centre in Winnipeg.

In a review of his novel The Jew Who Was Ukrainian, Michael Johnson wrote in The American Spectator:

Protagonist Volodymyr Frauenzimmer was born of a rape at the end of World War II, when his mother was a Ukrainian Auschwitz guard who hates Jews and his father a Stalinist thug and Jew who hates Ukrainians. They married but lived in separate rooms and rarely spoke to each other... Alexander Motyl was clearly having great fun when he wrote his latest book, The Jew Who Was Ukrainian, a comic novel with half-serious historical underpinnings. It manages to amuse and challenge without losing its headlong momentum into the realm of absurdist literature.

Motyl has written favorably of the claims made by former KGB officers Alnur Mussayev, Yuri Shvets and Sergei Zhyrnov that Donald Trump was cultivated and recruited by the KGB in 1987 to serve as a Russian intelligence "asset" (not an active "spy").

== Selected works ==
Academic books

- The Turn to the Right: The Ideological Origins and Development of Ukrainian Nationalism, 1919-1929, (East European Monographs, no. 65; 1980). ISBN (PDF). New York: Columbia University Press. 1980. ISBN 978-0-91471-058-5.
- Will the Non-Russians Rebel? State, Ethnicity, and Stability in the USSR, (Cornell University Press, 1987). ISBN 978-0-80141-947-8
- Sovietology, Rationality, Nationality: Coming to Grips with Nationalism in the USSR (Columbia University Press, 1990). ISBN 978-0-23107-326-4
- Dilemmas of Independence: Ukraine after Totalitarianism, (Council on Foreign Relations Press, 1993). ISBN 978-0-87609-131-9
- Revolutions, Nations, Empires: Conceptual Limits and Theoretical Possibilities, (Columbia University Press, 1999). ISBN 978-0-23111-431-8
- Imperial Ends: The Decline, Collapse, and Revival of Empires, (Columbia University Press, 2001). ISBN 978-0-23112-110-1
- Ukraine vs Russia: Revolution, Democracy, and War. Washington, DC: Westphalia Press, 2017.
- Bits and Pieces: Fragmentary Memoirs. Amazon KDP, 2020.
- National Questions: Theoretical Reflections on Nations and Nationalism in Eastern Europe. Ibidem, 2022.

Editor

- Between America and Galicia: The Memoirs of Maria and Alexander Motyl. Lviv: Manuskrypt, 2019.
- The Great West Ukrainian Prison Massacre of 1941: A Sourcebook. Amsterdam: Amsterdam University Press, 2016. Co-edited with Ksenya Kiebuzinski.
- The Holodomor Reader: A Sourcebook on the Famine of 1932-1933 in Ukraine, co-edited with Bohdan Klid, (University of Alberta Press, 2012). ISBN 978-1-89486-529-6
- Russia’s Engagement with the West: Transformation and Integration in the Twenty-First Century, co-edited with Blair Ruble and Lilia Shevtsova, (Routledge, 2005). ISBN 978-0-76561-442-1
- The Encyclopedia of Nationalism, 2 vols., (Academic Press, 2000). ISBN 978-0-12227-230-1
