= Nurbank murder case =

2007 double homicide in Kazakhstan

The Nurbank bank, founded in Atyrau regional governor's office was taken over by Rakhat Aliyev in January 2007. Shortly after, two Nurbank managers, Zholdas Timraliyev and Aybar Khasenov, were kidnapped, tortured and eventually killed by Aliyev. In May 2007, the criminal proceedings against Aliyev in Almaty began and Kazakhstan sentenced him for forty years.

== History ==
In 1992, the Nurbank bank opened for business and became the seventh largest bank in Kazakhstan. "According to its Website, it is owned by the largest oil, food, publishing and foreign trade firms operating in Kazakhstan, and also currently lends to oil, food, foreign trade, and publishing & information firms."

In January 2007, Rakhat Aliyev became the main owner and acquired about 75% of all Nurbank’s assets. His father owned 6.71% and his 22-year-old son Nurali Aliyev was a sitting board member.

== First kidnapping ==
Around January 18, 2007, Zholdas Timraliyev (vice president) and Abilmazhen Gilimov (chairmen of Nurbank) entered into a car and were threatened by Rakhat Aliyev, according to Abilmazhen Gilimov. Rakhat was looking to acquire possession of a prized financial building in Kazakhstan's commercial capital, Almaty by ensuring ownership passed to him. They escaped after 24 hours. During his kidnapping, Timraliyev was able to phone his wife and tell of his abduction. Timraliyev's wife (Armangul Kapasheva/Armangul Qapasheva) reported him missing. They escaped after being held for 24 hours. They both left their positions at Nurbank on January 19.

According to newspapers, the building Aliyev wanted them to sell, sold on January 22 for a very low price, four days after the alleged first kidnapping.

== Second kidnapping ==
On January 31, Timraliyev disappeared again after receiving summons to speak with the tax police. He and chairman of the board, Aibar Khasenov were reported missing. After a days of violent acts, both of the bodies were tucked into a metal drum, assailed with chalk and buried on a waste dump.

During his kidnapping, Timraliyev was able to phone his wife (Armangul Kapasheva) and tell of his abduction. She reported them missing and her strong public appearance about the disappearance of her husband and mounting pressure against Aliyev, the Kazakh authorities finally initiated criminal proceedings on May 10, 2007. The wives of the two missing Nurbank managers establish the TAGDYR association in order to find their husbands.

== Lawsuits ==
See also Tagdyr

As a result, Aliyev brought forth a lawsuit against the two wives, for “insulting his honor and dignity.”

Timraliyev’s wife was interviewed and several news outlets including, Svoboda Slova," "Tasjargan," "Vremya," and zonakz.net published her comments and now faced legal suit from Aliyev.

== Criminal prosecution ==
Aliyev was quickly appointed the new Kazakh ambassador to Austria on February 9, 2007 as a polite way to get him out of the country. While in Austria, Aliyev announced his candidacy for the upcoming Kazakhstan elections and criticized the sitting Kazakh President, Nursultan Nazarbayev. A full domestic Kazakh investigation began in May 2007 into Aliyev’s activities. His diplomatic passport was cancelled, as was his diplomatic immunity. Kazakhstan filed its first extradition request at this time. The domestic Kazakh investigation concluded January 2008 and Kazakh courts sentenced Aliyev to 20 years of imprisonment in absentia. His crimes were kidnapping, treason and plotting a coup d'état against his father-in-law Nursultan Nazarbayev.

Their second request for extradition in 2011 was also rejected, as Austria feared Kazak political persecution of Aliyev. They did however open their own investigation into Aliyev's dealings.

January 2013, Aliyev claimed Kazakhstan was politically persecuting him because he rejected the political system. The Viennese supreme court excluded political underpinnings as a reason for persecution, which helped to greatly legitimize legal action brought against him.

== Other crimes ==
Rakhat Aliyev (Shoraz) is also suspected of the murder of opposition leader and former Kazak ambassador to Russia Mr Sarsenbayev in early 2006, a complex embezzlement scheme stretching from Germany to Malta and Nevis, torturing two Kazak bodyguards in 2001, and the death of his girlfriend Anastasiya Novikova in 2004.
