= Nadezhda Tokayeva =

Former wife of Kassym-Jomart Tokayev (born 1958)

- Надежда Тоқаева

First Lady of Kazakhstan
- In office 20 March 2019 – 27/29 March 2019
- President: Kassym-Jomart Tokayev
- Preceded by: Sara Nazarbayeva
- Succeeded by: Vacant

Personal details
- Born: 27 September 1958 (age 68) Nizhny Tagil, Russian SFSR, Soviet Union
- Spouse: Kassym-Jomart Tokayev (div. 2019)
- Children: 1
- Education: Moscow State Institute for History and Archives

Nadezhda Davydovna Tokayeva (Kazakh: Надежда Давыдқызы Тоқаева, romanized: Nadejda Davydqyzy Toqaeva, Russian: Надежда Давыдовна Токаева [nɐˈdʲeʐdə dɐˈvɨdovnɐ tʰəkʰɐjeva]; born 23 January or 27 September 1958) is the ex-wife of the second president of Kazakhstan, Kassym-Jomart Tokayev.

== Early life and education ==
Tokayeva was born in Nizhny Tagil in Russia's Sverdlovsk Oblast. She graduated from the Moscow State Institute for History and Archives.

== Career ==
She served as the honorary president of the United Nations Women's Guild in Geneva from 2011 to 2012.

== Personal life ==
At the time of taking office as President of Kazakhstan, Kassym-Jomart Tokayev was divorced from Nadezhda, as indicated on the official website in March 2019. It is presumed that the divorce took place between 27 and 29 March 2019.

Together with her ex-husband, she has a son, Timur (born 15 February 1984).

In 1998, she and her son Timur opened a Credit Suisse bank account, even though she qualified as a politically exposed person, which at its height in 2005 contained $1.5 million. After her husband became director-general of the United Nations’ Geneva office, the account was closed in 2012, and the family opened offshore companies in the British Virgin Islands, with $5 million in assets plus properties in Geneva and Moscow at $7.7 million.

== See also ==
- Suisse Secrets

== Links ==
- Photo
