= Anastasiya Novikova (journalist) =

Kazakhstani journalist

Anastasiya Georgievna Novikova (Russian: Анастасия Георгиевна Новикова; 22 November 1980 – 19 June 2004) was a Kazakh television presenter. Rakhat Aliyev, a former senior government official who was related by marriage to Kazakh President Nursultan Nazarbayev, was accused of involvement in her mysterious death in Lebanon.

Born in Uzbekistan to Russian parents, Novikova moved to Kazakhstan where she met one of NTK's owners, Rakhat Aliyev. When Aliyev was named ambassador to Austria in 2002, Novikova followed him to Vienna and allegedly became romantically involved. Eyewitnesses who were close associates of Aliyev testified that Novikova became pregnant with Aliyev's daughter, was coerced to marry Daniyar Esten, a cousin of Aliyev who worked at the Kazakh Embassy in Vienna, and then sent to give birth to the baby in Beirut, Lebanon.

Novikova died violently under mysterious circumstances on 19 June 2004, after a fall from the Beirut apartment building where she lived. Her body was flown from Lebanon to a remote area in Kazakhstan and "secretly buried in a pre-prepared place" according to a Kazakhstan Interior Ministry spokesman. Esten died in a traffic accident in Austria in 2005.

After Novikova's body was discovered and identified in July 2007, police raised a possible link between the dead woman and Aliyev because her remains had been taken from Lebanon to the secret burial site by people connected to the Nurbank murder case in which Aliyev was implicated. Aliyev was convicted in Kazakhstan of crimes in the Nurbank case, and in June 2014 turned himself in to the Austrian authorities on an international arrest warrant. Aliyev always maintained his innocence.

Nobody has been charged in association with Novikova's disappearance and death, and the whereabouts of her child remain publicly unknown. The widows of the murdered Nurbank executives started an organization called Tagdyr that advocates on behalf of the alleged victims of Aliyev and his associates.

== Social Movement ==
On the 10 year anniversary of Novikova's death an international movement called JusticeForNovikova.com began with the intention to bring her alleged murderer, Rakhat Aliyev to justice. On 19 June 2014 protest were held at Lowndes Square. and according to CNN, on 21 July protests also occurred in front of the Vienna Criminal Court, where Aliyev had a scheduled court hearing.

From jail, Aliyev denounced the Justice for Novikova protesters as agents of the Kazakhstan secret services, an accusation consistent with his denunciations of high-profile European political figures. Aliyev reportedly branded his critics in the West as paid agents of Kazakhstani intelligence, and has surfaced forged documents in an effort to defame his detractors.
