= Qairat Boranbaev =

Kazakh businessman

Kairat Boranbayev
- Қайрат Боранбаев
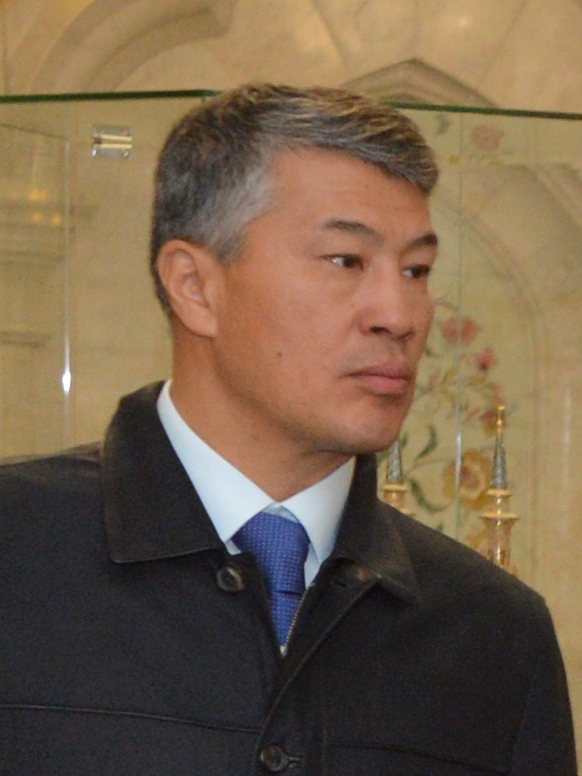
- Boranbaev in 2012
- Born: 22 September 1966 (age 59); Torgay Region, Kazakh SSR, Soviet Union
- Citizenship: Kazakhstan
- Occupations: Businessman, owner of FC Kairat Almaty
- Spouse: Sholpan Boranbayeva
- Children: 4

Qairat Sovetaiūly Boranbaev (Note: Often transliterated as Kairat Sovetayevich Boranbayev through a Russified Romanization of Кайрат Советаевич Боранбаев.) (Kazakh: Қайрат Советайұлы Боранбаев; born 22 September 1966) is a Kazakh businessmаn. Boranbaev is the incumbent President of the National Paralympic Committee of Kazakhstan and chairman of the supervisory board of FC Kairat.

With a personal wealth of 590 million dollars, Boranbayev was on the Forbes Top 50 influential entrepreneurs of Kazakhstan list.

== Early life and education ==
Boranbaev's family of origin lived in the settlement of Amengeldy, Torgay Region. An avid athlete, Kairat first took up boxing, then soccer.

Boranbaev went on to study at the Kazakh Academy of Sport and got his PhD in education in 1999. In 2000, he also received a Law degree from Al-Farabi Kazakh National University.

== Career ==
Boranbayev's first job was at a regional school, and later, between 1991 and 1993, he worked at Sports school No. 21 in Almaty.

Kairat left coaching in 1993 to start a company called DECA and later held executive positions at Alash, Altyn-Alma and Sistema joint-stock companies.

Having received a Law degree, Boranbayev decided in 2000 to make a career in the oil and gas sector and joined KazTransGas, Intergas Central Asia and KazRosGas as a top manager.

Kairat has engaged in diverse business projects ranging from oil&gas to real estate and retail, he owned a stake at Esentai Mall and Esentai Tower, Karaganda Pharmaceutical Cluster, fitness centers. His interests encompassed roughly thirty business activities.

In 2016 Mr. Boranbayev became a McDonald's franchisee for Kazakhstan, Belarus and some regions of Russia.

== Social activities ==
Sport played a role in Kairat's social activities. In 2009, he became the President of Kostanay Regional Boxing Federation.

In 2012 Mr. Boranbayev also became the chairman of the supervisory board of FC Kairat.

In 2015, he came to the helm of Kazakhstan's National Paralympic Committee.

In 2017 he became a Vice President of UEFA Fair Play and Social Responsibility Committee.

== Personal life ==
Kairat and Sholpan Boranbayev have 4 children. Alima, their eldest daughter, is best known as the widow of Aisultan Nazarbayev, grandson of President Nursultan Nazarbayev. The couple had a daughter named Amelie.

== Criminal prosecution ==
On March 17, 2022, Kairat Boranbayev was arrested and charged with large-scale embezzlement in the quasi-public sector.

During investigation, numerous famous athletes, musicians and moviemakers testified in support of Kairat.

On March 31, 2023 Astana court sentenced him to 8 years in prison and ordered his assets to be seized.
