= Timur Kulibayev =

Kazakh oligarch (born 1966)

- Тимур Құлыбаев
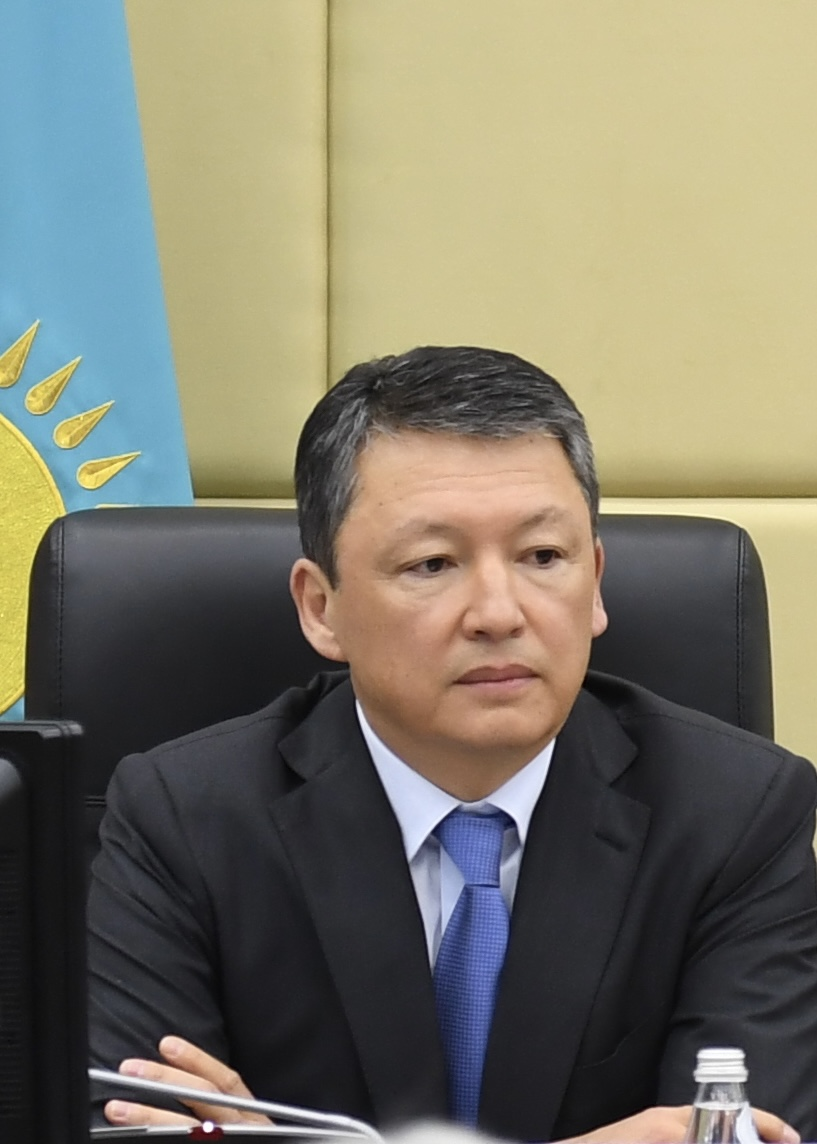
- Kulibayev in 2017
- Born: 10 September 1966 (age 59); Almaty, Kazakh SSR, Soviet Union
- Education: Moscow State University
- Spouse: Dinara Nazarbayeva (m. 1990)
- Children: 3

Timur Askaruly Kulibayev (Kazakh: Тимур Асқарұлы Құлыбаев, Timur Asqarūly Qūlybayev, [tɘjˈmur ɑsˌqɑrʊˈɫɤ qʊɫɤˈbɑjɪf]; born 10 September 1966) is a Kazakh businessman. He is the son-in-law of former Kazakh president Nursultan Nazarbayev. He is known as Kazakhstan's "Oil Prince" due to his connections to Kazakh political elites and Kazakh state-owned energy companies.

Kulibayev held several high-level government positions during his father-in-law's rule of Kazakhstan, including in Kazakh state-owned enterprises that manage Kazakhstan's natural resources and have immense influence over the country's hydrocarbon industry. He is the former head of Samruk-Kazyna (Kazakhstan's sovereign wealth fund). He was on the board of directors of the Gazprom, Russia's largest energy company from 2011 to 2022. In 2020, the Financial Times reported that Kulibayev was involved in schemes to skim at least tens of millions of dollars from contracts that the Kazakhstani state made on pipeline construction.

Kuliabayev and his wife's wealth have been estimated at more than $10 billion. Kulibayev has been called "the most important business figure" in the Republic of Kazakhstan by The Daily Telegraph.

== Early life and education ==
Kulibayev was born on 10 September 1966 in Alma-Ata (now Almaty), Kazakh SSR, USSR. His father was a Communist Party boss in the Soviet Union.

In 1988, he graduated from Lomonosov Moscow State University after studying "National Economy Planning".

He defended his PhD thesis on the topic "Improving the Organizational and Economic Mechanism of Enterprise Management in Market Conditions (Using the Example of the Oil Industry)" in 1999.

== Business career ==
From 1988 to 1992, he was a junior research assistant at the Scientific-Research Economics Institute of Planning and Normative Standards (SREIP&NS) under the State Plan of Kazakh Soviet Socialist Republic, and was a director of the Scientific-Consulting Center of the Fund of Cultural, Social, Scientific and Technological Development of Kazakhstan.

From 1992 to 1995, he headed the Altyn-Alma concern (it was transformed into the Almex holding).

In 1995, he founded the Almaty Trade and Financial Bank together with his partners. He took the position of chairman of the supervisory board and joined the credit committee.

From 1997 to 1999, he was vice president for economics and finance at Kazakhoil. In 1999, he became the head of the National Oil Transportation Company KazTransOil CJSC (a state-owned company for the management of the main oil pipelines). From 2001 to 2002, he headed CJSC National Oil and Gas Transport Company (formed on the basis of KazTransOil and KazTransGas). From 2002 to 2005, he held the position of first vice president of JSC National Company KazMunayGas (which united Kazakhoil and the Oil and Gas Transport Company). From 2006 to 2007 he was a member of the company's board of directors, and from 2009 to 2012 he was chairman of the board. Timur Kulibayev participated in the deal to buy out 8.33% of the North Caspian project from British Gas, which ensured the participation of KazMunayGas in the development of the Kashagan field. Timur Kulibayev's activities in the company have led to an increase in recoverable oil reserves, the expansion and diversification of transport routes for hydrocarbons, and an increase in oil refining capacity.

From 2005 to 2013, he was a freelance advisor to his father-in-law, Nursultan Nazarbayev, the president of the Republic of Kazakhstan.

From 2006 to 2007, he was deputy chairman of the National Welfare Fund Samruk-Kazyna JSC. In 2008, he became the chairman of the board. He also held the position of chairman of the board of directors in subsidiaries of the holding: Kazatomprom (2008-2012), Kazakhstan Temir Zholy (2009-2011), Samruk-Energo (2009-2011). On 26 December 2011, Kulibayev resigned from the post of chairman of the board of Samruk-Kazyna. On 26 December 2011, Kulibayev resigned from the post of chairman of the board of Samruk-Kazyna. From 2006 to 2007, he was a member of the board of directors of KEGOC, and from 2008 to 2011, he headed the board. On 26 December 2011, Kulibayev resigned from the post of chairman of the board of Samruk-Kazyna.

Kulibayev joined the board of Gazprom in 2011. In March 2022, he resigned from Gazprom's board with immediate effect. Since June 2008, he has been chairman of the Kazakhstan National Committee of the World Petroleum Council.

In 2020, the Financial Times reported on emails and whistleblower information which showed that staff for Kulibayev was involved in schemes that would allow Kulibayev to skim at least tens of millions of dollars from contracts that the Kazakhstani state made on pipeline construction. Kulibayev has denied the allegations.

Due to the 2022 Kazakh unrest, Kulibayev and his wife Dinara lost $200 million after Halyk Bank fell 16% at the London Stock Exchange.

Kulibayev was appointed to the board of directors of the Russian largest energy company shows the particular importance of economic cooperation between Kazakhstan and the Russian Federation, as well as a recognition of high professional qualities of the chief executive of Samruk-Kazyna Fund.

== Public Activities ==
From 2005 to 2023, he headed the Kazakh Association of Organizations of the Oil and Gas and Energy Complex Kazenergy, a structure that deals with establishing relations between private investors and government agencies and unites national and foreign companies operating in the energy sector of Kazakhstan.

From 2009 to 2024, he headed the Kazakhstan Boxing Federation. During this period, the Kazakh boxing team won one gold, one silver, and two bronze medals at the 2012 Olympic Games and one gold, two silver, and two bronze medals at the 2016 Olympics.

In 2010, he took the position of chairman of the Presidium of the National Economic Chamber of Kazakhstan "Atameken Union".

From 2010 to 2015, he was a member of the executive committee of the National Olympic Committee of the Republic of Kazakhstan.

In 2012, he took the positions of vice president and member of the executive committee of the International Amateur Boxing Association (AIBA).

From 2012 to 2016, he held the position of chairman of the Association of Legal Entities in the Confederation of Combat and Power Sports, which included the republic's federations of boxing, wrestling, weightlifting, and judo.

In 2013, the National Chamber of Entrepreneurs of the Republic of Kazakhstan was established by decision of the government of Kazakhstan and Atameken Union. Timur Kulibayev was elected chairman of the Presidium of the Chamber. He held this position until January 17, 2022. During this period, he supervised the implementation of the Chamber's projects, regularly traveled around the country, visited enterprises, and communicated with entrepreneurs and representatives of various government bodies.

From 2015 to 2024, he was the president of the National Olympic Committee of the Republic of Kazakhstan and chairman of the executive committee of the National Olympic Committee of the Republic of Kazakhstan Public Association.

From 2016 to 2019, he headed the Swimming Sports Federation of Kazakhstan.

In 2016, he assumed the position of vice president and member of the executive committee of the Olympic Council of Asia (OCA, Olympic Council of Asia).

From 2017 to 2019, he was a member of the Public Affairs and Social Development Through Sport Commission (PASD) of the International Olympic Committee. It was transformed into the IOC Olympism 365 Commission, which Kulibayev joined in September 2022.

From 2018 to 2023, he was a member of the Presidium of the Kazakhstan Golf Federation.

In 2018, he joined the executive committee of the Association of National Olympic Committees (ANOC).

== Personal life ==
Kulibayev is married to Dinara Nursultanovna (née Nazarbayeva), daughter of Kazakhstan's long-time president Nursultan Nazarbayev. She and Kulibayev have three children. He owns a vast real estate portfolio, including a mansion in the United Kingdom, castles in Switzerland and Germany, and a Spanish estate. In 2025, Kulibayev was reported to own eight properties in Spain.

Kulibayev has two sons from an extramarital affair with Goga Ashkenazi.

In 2007, Kulibayev (with the help of Kazakhstani investor Kenes Rakishev) became the owner of Sunninghill Park, a country house formerly belonging to Mr Andrew Mountbatten-Windsor, after Sarah Ferguson and their daughters left the property in 2006. Kulibayev paid $19.7 million for the house, $4 million over the asking price, even though there were no other bids. In 2016 it was demolished and a 14-bedroom mansion was built in its place.

Kulibayev's sporting hobbies include golf, skiing, and soccer.

He speaks Kazakh, Russian, and English.

=== Awards ===
- Order of Kurmet (Honor) (2001)
- Jubilee medal "10th Anniversary of the Constitution of the Republic of Kazakhstan" (2005)
- Order of Friendship (Russia, December 20, 2007) — for his great contribution to strengthening friendship and cooperation in the development of the fuel and energy complex of the Russian Federation and the Republic of Kazakhstan
- Jubilee medal "10th Anniversary of Astana" (2008)
- Order of Barys (Leopard), III Degree (2009)
- Order of Al-Fakhr (Honor) of the Council of Muftis of Russia (2010)
- Order of the Holy Prince Daniel of Moscow of the Russian Orthodox Church, II Degree (ROC, 2010)
- Jubilee medal "20th Anniversary of the Independence of the Republic of Kazakhstan" (2011)
- Badge "Honorary Railwayman" of the CIS (2011)
- Order of Barys (Leopard) I Degree (2014)
- Jubilee medal "25th Anniversary of the Independence of the Republic of Kazakhstan" (2016)
- Badge "Honored Worker of the Oil and Gas Industry" (2020)
- Order of Otan (Fatherland) (2021)
- Order of Enbek Ushin (For Labors) of the Head of the Metropolitan District of the Russian Orthodox Church in the Republic of Kazakhstan (2021)
