= Asar (political party) =

Former Kazakh political party

Asar Асар
- Chairperson: Dariga Nazarbayeva
- Founded: 25 October 2003; 21 years ago
- Dissolved: 4 July 2006; 19 years ago
- Merged into: Otan

Website
- asar.kz (archived)

Asar Republican Party (Kazakh: «Асар» Республикалық партиясы, Russian: Республиканская партия «Асар») was a political party in Kazakhstan, founded on 25 October 2003. It was headed by Dariga Nazarbayeva, the eldest daughter of then-president of Kazakhstan Nursultan Nazarbayev. In January 2004, the Asar parliamentary faction was created, consisting of 7 senators and 3 Mazhilis deputies, not all of whom were members of the Asar party. In the 2004 Kazakh legislative election, the party won 11.4% of the popular vote and 4 out of 77 seats in the Mazhilis. Following calls from its leader Dariga Nazarbayeva for a united ruling party, and allegations that her father (president of Kazakhstan Nursultan Nazarbayev) was becoming increasingly concerned by the group's independence, Asar merged with Otan on 4 July 2006. The merger process was completed in September of that year.

== Election results ==
=== Mazhilis ===
Election	Party leader	Votes	%	Seats	+/–	Position
2004	Dariga Nazarbayeva	541,239	11.4	4 / 77	▲4	▲3rd
