= Aidar Akayev =

Kyrgyz politician (1976–2020)

- Айдар Акаев

Member of the Jogorku Kenesh
- In office February 2005 – March 2005

Personal details
- Born: 20 February 1976 Leningrad, Russian SFSR, Soviet Union
- Died: 5 February 2020 (aged 43) Moscow, Russia
- Spouse: Aliya Nazarbayeva (m. 1999; div. 2001)
- Parents: Askar Akayev (father); Mayram Akayeva (mother)
- Occupation: Businessman; politician

Aidar Askarovich Akayev (Kyrgyz: Айдар Аскарович Акаев; 20 February 1976 – 5 February 2020) was a Kyrgyz businessman and public figure. He was the son of former President of Kyrgyzstan Askar Akayev and the first husband of Aliya Nazarbayeva, the youngest daughter of former Kazakh President Nursultan Nazarbayev.

He was born on 20 February 1976 in Leningrad, Russian SFSR, Soviet Union (now Saint Petersburg, Russia). His father, Askar, was then a professor at the Leningrad Institute of Precision Mechanics and Optics, where he met Aidar's mother Mayram. A year after his birth, Akayev and his family moved to the city of Frunze (now Bishkek, Kyrgyzstan) in the Kyrgyz SSR. His father became president of the now-independent Kyrgyz Republic in October 1990.

Aidar studied at the University of Maryland and graduated in 1998 with a degree in management and business. Moving back to Kyrgyzstan later that year, he became director of the Representative Office of Kazkommertsbank OJSC in Bishkek. He later moved to Almaty, Kazakhstan, where he worked in Kazkommertsbank, which is the largest bank in the country. While working in Almaty, Akayev, who was then 24 years old, met 18-year-old Aliya Nazarbayeva, the daughter of Kazakh President Nursultan Nazarbayev, and they married in 1999. The marriage was short-lived however, with the two separating in 2001. According to the BBC, the marriage was "seen by many people as a return to the old Central Asian tradition of cementing political ties with family ones."

In February 2001, Akayev served as a chief Advisor to the Minister of Finance of Kyrgyzstan. From December 23, 2004 to March 30, 2005, he served as President of the National Olympic Committee of the Kyrgyz Republic as well as the President of the Boxing Federation of Kyrgyzstan concurrently. On January 18, 2005, Akayev filed an application for participation in the February parliamentary elections, in which he was elected to parliament with 79.65% of the vote.

Akayev's older sister, Bermet Akayeva, was also elected to the Jogorku Kenesh, which caused great outcry on the part of the opposition and popular protests because the election results were seen as rigged. The events that unfolded in the country became known as the Tulip Revolution. It culminated on March 24, 2005 when the crowds took over the presidential palace in Bishkek and his father along with his family was forced to flee by a helicopter to neighboring Kazakhstan. Akayev was deprived of all government posts, including his membership in Jogorku Kenesh, with the country's prosecutor general bringing criminal charges against him on the count of embezzlement of state funds, financial fraud and misappropriation of another's property under threat of force.

Akayev then lived in exile with his father in Moscow, where his father is a professor at Moscow State University. Russian Federation refused to return him to the Kyrgyz authorities. Beside the Kyrgyz language, Akayev was also fluent in Russian and English.

Akayev died from sudden cardiac arrest in Moscow on 5 February 2020, at the age of 43.
