= Alnur Mussayev =

Kazakh intelligence officer and politician (born 1954)

- Әлнұр Мұсаев
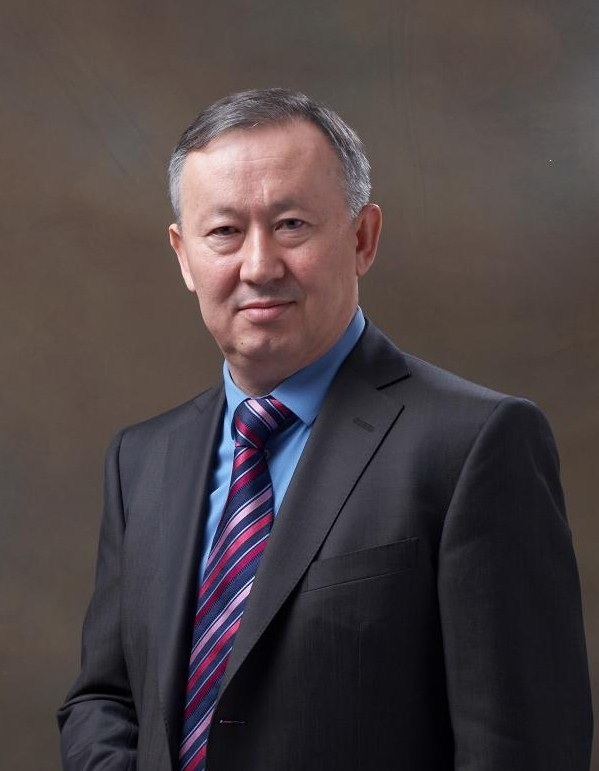
- Official portrait, 2007

Chairman of the National Security Committee
- In office 12 May 1997 – 1 September 1998
- President: Nursultan Nazarbayev
- Preceded by: Djanisbek Djumanbekov
- Succeeded by: Nurtai Abykayev
- In office 9 August 1999 – 5 May 2001
- President: Nursultan Nazarbayev
- Preceded by: Nurtai Abykayev
- Succeeded by: Marat Tazhin

Personal details
- Born: 4 January 1954 (age 72) Lugovoe, Kazakh SSR, Soviet Union
- Party: QKP (until 1991)
- Children: 2
- Education: Satbayev University; Institute of National Security of the Republic of Belarus

Alnur Aljapparuly Mussayev (Kazakh: Әлнұр Әлжаппарұлы Мұсаев, Älnūr Äljapparūly Mūsaev; born 4 January 1954) is a Kazakh politician who served as Chairman of the National Security Committee (KNB) under President Nursultan Nazarbayev.

== Biography ==
In 1979, he was called up for active military service in the KGB of the Soviet Union, and entered the KGB Higher School (now FSB Academy). After graduating, he was assigned to the counterintelligence agencies of the KGB of the Kazakh Soviet Socialist Republic. In 1983–1984, during the Iran–Iraq War, he visited Baghdad, Iraq on a special mission. In 1986–1989, he was seconded to the Ministry of Internal Affairs of the USSR and held senior positions in its 8th Main Directorate, after which he returned to the KGB.

Since 1992, he has held senior positions in the National Security Committee of Kazakhstan, the Ministry of Internal Affairs and the Presidential Security Service. In 1994, Mussayev headed the National Security Committee's Special Group for Combating Corruption under the Prosecutor General's Office and the Main Directorate for Combating Organized Crime and Corruption of the Ministry of Internal Affairs of Kazakhstan. In November 1995, he became an assistant to the president, and then the first deputy commander of the Republican Guard and head of the Presidential Security Service.

In 1995, by his own admission, Musayev, acting on orders from Kazakhstan's president Nazarbayev, orchestrated the sale of 578 kg (1,274 lb) of weapons-grade uranium abroad.

=== Chairman of the National Security Committee ===
Musayev served as chairman of the National Security Committee (KNB) from May 1997 to September 1998 and from August 1999 to May 2001.

In May 1997, Musayev was appointed chairman of the National Security Committee (KNB), replacing Lieutenant General Dzhenisbek Dzhumanbekov, and was simultaneously promoted to the rank of general. At the same time, Musayev carried out an unprecedented reform of the KNB leadership, as all deputy chairmen left their posts. As head of the KNB, Musayev actively fought corruption, which particularly affected akims (heads of administrations) at various levels. According to some sources, he also exerted active pressure on opposition forces (mentioned are beatings of journalists and confiscations of newspaper print runs by KNB officers).

In September 1998, in the run-up to the 1999 Kazakh presidential election, Nurtai Abykayev became the chairman of the KNB, while Musayev was appointed his first deputy. The ongoing fight against corruption during this period also affected the former Prime Minister Akejan Kajegeldin.

In August 1999, Abykayev was sacked in a scandal over an attempted sale of old MiG-21 fighter planes to North Korea, and Musayev again became chairman of the committee.

In early May 2001, Marat Tajin was appointed chairman of the National Security Committee, and Musayev again became head of the Presidential Security Service. Musayev's transfer was interpreted both as a strengthening of the security service and as a manifestation of Nazarbayev's dissatisfaction with Musayev. In February 2002, Musayev left this position as well.

=== Since 2007 ===
In 2007, Mussayev fled Kazakhstan along with his former deputy Rakhat Aliyev to Vienna, Austria. Mussayev accused the government of widespread corruption and payments of millions of dollars in bribes by western oil companies to President Nazarbayev. The government of Kazakhstan has convicted him of crimes in absentia as a result of his defection.

An attempted kidnapping of Mussayev took place in Vienna in September 2008. The Austrian government declined to comment on the perpetrators' origins at the time. In a January 2010 trial, defendant Ildar A., one of three men charged with the kidnap attempt on Mussayev, was found not guilty by an Austrian court. Mussayev described the verdict as "politically motivated" and an "attempt to please Kazakhstan". During the trial, Mussayev claimed not to know Ildar A., but he admitted in press comments soon after that this was not entirely accurate, as he knew the defendant professionally but not personally; he explained the discrepancy by claiming that his oath to Kazakhstan prevented him from revealing this information.

In 2015, Mussayev faced charges for the abduction and murder of two bankers in the Nurbank murder case. The primary suspect in the case, Rakhat Aliyev, was found hanged in his prison cell before the trial began. The trial was one of the most complex in Austrian history with over 60 witnesses. Mussayev was cleared of all charges.

== "Krasnov" claim ==
In 2025, Mussayev claimed that Donald Trump had been recruited by the KGB when he visited "Moscow as a real estate developer in 1987" and was given the codename "Krasnov". Several sources note that he does not provide any clear evidence to support his claim. (Note: "Krasnov") "Mussayev did not specify that Trump actively or knowingly participated in any espionage activities or provide examples, only that he was recruited", claims that are also asserted by former KGB spies Yuri Shvets and Sergei Zhyrnov. Mussayev also asserted that Trump is compromised:

I have no doubt that Russia has kompromat on the US President, that over the course of many years the Kremlin has been promoting Trump to the post of President of the main world power.
