= American International School - Salzburg =

International school in Salzburg, Austria

Coordinates: 47.7768°N 13.0206°E

The American International School Salzburg's New Logo.

The American International School - Salzburg is an international college preparatory boarding and day school located in Salzburg, Austria. The school is operated on an American High School curriculum accredited by the Middle States Association. Formerly called The Salzburg International Preparatory School (SIPS), the school was founded in 1976. The student body generally consists of around 100 students, typically representing as many as 20 countries. Day students normally make up about 25% of the student population. The school offers a junior high school program (grades 7 and 8) in addition to a high school program (grades 9 through 12), which includes an Advanced Placement program. The school year is divided into three trimesters beginning the second week of September and ending in late May. The school also operates a summer school program, as well as a summer language program (SILC).
