= Aisultan Nazarbayev =

Kazakh footballer (1990–2020)

- Nazarbayev in 2012

Personal information
- Full name: Aisultan Rakhatuly Nazarbayev
- Birth name: Aisultan Rakhatovich Aliyev
- Date of birth: 26 August 1990
- Place of birth: Kazakh SSR, Soviet Union
- Date of death: 16 August 2020 (aged 29)
- Place of death: London, England
- Height: 1.83 m (6 ft 0 in)

Youth career
- FC Admira Wacker Mödling
- 2007: Chelsea
- 2007: Portsmouth

Senior career*
Years	Team	Apps	(Gls)
2006	Rahat	2	(0)
2008	Kairat		(0)
2010	Astana	0	(0)
2012	Sunkar	1	(0)
- * Club domestic league appearances and goals

Aisultan Rakhatuly Nazarbayev (Kazakh: Айсұлтан Рахатұлы Назарбаев, Aisūltan Rahatūly Nazarbaev; 26 August 1990 – 16 August 2020) was a Kazakh footballer, businessman, grandson of former President of Kazakhstan Nursultan Nazarbayev, and son of Kazakh politician Dariga Nazarbayeva.

== Biography ==
=== Early life and education ===
Aisultan was born in 1990 in then-Kazakh SSR. His father Rakhat Aliyev (1961–2015) was a businessman, politician, and diplomat. His mother Dariga Nazarbayeva (born 1963) is the eldest daughter of Nursultan Nazarbayev.

He studied at the International College of Continuing Education in Astana and the American International School in Salzburg. In 2010, Aisultan graduated from the Royal Military Academy Sandhurst and then from KIMEP University with a degree in business administration.

=== Football career ===
Aisultan started playing football at FC Admira Wacker Mödling during his father's service as ambassador to Austria. In 2006, he played two matches in the first league of Kazakhstan for the FC Rahat football club. In 2007, he was a member of FC Kairat and took part in the qualifying tournament for the 2006 European Youth Football Championship. Aisultan spent two or three months at Chelsea F.C. He played a season in the youth team of Portsmouth F.C. and became the bronze medalist of the English Championship. In 2011, Aisultan played for FC Astana. On 21 October 2012, he played the only match in the championship of Kazakhstan in the home game for the FC Sunkar against FC Aktobe and came out in the middle of the second half.

From February to October 2017, Aisultan served as vice president of the Football Federation of Kazakhstan for relations with international organizations FIFA, UEFA, and national associations.

== Personal life ==
In August 2013, Aisultan was married to Alima Nazarbayeva. He had a daughter named Ameli (born 2016) and son named Sultan.

Aisultan once spent time in a clinic due to alleged cocaine use. It is unknown whether this treatment was voluntary or forced.

In October 2019, he was sentenced to a suspended sentence for an attack on a police officer in London in June 2019 and damage to a stranger's property. The verdict included probation, medical treatment, community service, and a fine.

On 23 January 2020, Aisultan made a public statement on his Facebook page, claiming that his grandfather Nazarbayev was allegedly his father and that his life was threatened. He also stated that from 8 July 2019, he had not been able to use any of his social media accounts, because he was kept in custody and that the accounts were under control by his mother Dariga Nazarbayeva and the ex-chairman of the NSC Alnur Mussayev. In response to those claims, Mussayev on his Facebook page published an unsubstantiated document from 2013 indicating a DNA match of over 99% between Aisultan and his father Rakhat Aliyev. However, following the death of Aisultan, Mussayev admitted to falsifying DNA records in his interview to Exclusive Kazakhstan and that Aliyev was indeed not the biological father, yet failed to name the true paternal identity.

On 13 February 2020, Aisultan requested political asylum in the United Kingdom. He explained this decision due to pressure by his family, claiming to possess information "about high-scale corruption between the government [sic] of Russia and Kazakhstan". He stated that he did not inherit his father's wealth because his father's wealth was stolen by his mother Dariga Nazarbayeva and Alnur Mussayev (or Musaev [Russian: Альнур Мусаев]) and that he was afraid that both of them wanted him killed. Minister of Information and Social Development Dauren Abaev reported to Khabar Agency that "to speculate on the fantasies of an addict just because he is the grandson of the First President, it’s not fair. It’s unfair and beyond morality. It is time to close this topic."

== Death ==
On 16 August 2020, it was reported that Aisultan had died in London, just ten days shy of his 30th birthday. The inquest into his death found that he died from natural and cocaine-related causes.

His mother, Nazarbayeva, stated "My family is devastated at the loss of our beloved Aisultan and we ask for privacy at this very difficult time." His body was returned to Kazakhstan and buried at Kensai Cemetery in Almaty.
