= First Lady of Kazakhstan =

Wife of the President of Kazakhstan

- Қазақстанның бірінші ханымы (Kazakh); Первая леди Казахстана (Russian)
- Flag of Kazakhstan
- Incumbent; Vacant (Note: Nadezhda Tokayeva divorced Kassym-Jomart Tokayev before 2019.)
- Abbreviation: FLOK
- Residence: Ak Orda Presidential Palace, Astana
- Term length: Concurrent with the president's term (unless a divorce or death takes place)
- Precursor: Spouse of the Chairman of the Supreme Soviet of the Kazakh SSR
- Inaugural holder: Sara Nazarbayeva (as wife of Nursultan Nazarbayev)
- Formation: December 16, 1991 (34 years ago)

The First Lady of Kazakhstan (Note: Kazakh: Қазақстанның бірінші ханымы, romanized: Qazaqstannyñ bırınşı xanymy; Russian: Первая леди Казахстана, romanized: Pervaya ledi Kazakhstana; also known as First Lady of the Republic of Kazakhstan) is the unofficial title of the wife of the president of Kazakhstan. Under the divorced president Kassym-Jomart Tokayev, the position is vacant. The first person to hold the title was Sara Nazarbayeva, wife of Nursultan Nazarbayev.

== List of first ladies of Kazakhstan (1991–present) ==
No.	Portrait	Name	Education	Marriage	Period		Length of tenure	President of Kazakhstan (Spouse)
1		Sara Nazarbayeva (née Konakayeva); Born: 12 February 1941 (age 85)	Karaganda Industrial University	m. 1962	16 December 1991	20 March 2019	27 years, 3 months and 4 days	Nursultan Nazarbayev
2		Nadezhda Tokayeva; Born: 27 September 1958 (age 68)	Moscow State Institute for History and Archives		20 March 2019	27/29 March 2019	7 days	Kassym-Jomart Tokayev

== See also ==
- First Lady
- Kazakhstan
- President of Kazakhstan
