= Godfather-in-law =

Book by Rakhat Aliyev

Godfather-in-law (Russian: Крёстный тесть, romanized: Kryostny test) is a documentary book written by Rakhat Aliyev, former son-in-law of the President of Kazakhstan Nursultan Nazarbayev. In his book, Aliyev gives a deep insight into the corrupt, criminal activities of the autocratic system in Kazakhstan, including secrets and the system of governance of Nursultan Nazarbayev. The book Godfather-in-law was published in German and English languages. There is a criminal liability in Kazakhstan for distributing and using the book.
