= Dinara Kulibaeva =

Kazakh billionaire

- Динара Құлыбаева

Chairman of the Board of Directors of Kazakh-British Technical University
- Incumbent
- Assumed office 2004
- President: Nursultan Nazarbayev; Kassym-Jomart Tokayev
- Prime Minister: See list: Daniyal Akhmetov; Karim Massimov; Serik Akhmetov; Karim Massimov; Bakhytzhan Sagintayev; Asqar Mamin; Älihan Smaiylov; Oljas Bektenov

Member of the Board of Directors of Kazakh Ablai Khan University
- Incumbent
- Assumed office since 2001
- President: Nursultan Nazarbayev; Kassym-Jomart Tokayev
- Prime Minister: See list: Kassym-Jomart Tokayev; Imangali Tasmagambetov; Daniyal Akhmetov; Karim Massimov; Serik Akhmetov; Karim Massimov; Bakhytzhan Sagintayev; Asqar Mamin; Älihan Smaiylov; Oljas Bektenov

Director of Nursultan Nazarbayev Education Fund (NNEF)
- Incumbent
- Assumed office 1998
- President: Nursultan Nazarbayev; Kassym-Jomart Tokayev
- Prime Minister: See list: Nurlan Balgimbayev; Kassym-Jomart Tokayev; Imangali Tasmagambetov; Daniyal Akhmetov; Karim Massimov; Serik Akhmetov; Karim Massimov; Bakhytzhan Sagintayev; Asqar Mamin; Älihan Smaiylov; Oljas Bektenov

Head of Bobek Foundation
- In office 1996–1998
- President: Nursultan Nazarbayev
- Prime Minister: Akejan Kajegeldin; Nurlan Balgimbayev

Personal details
- Born: Dinara Nursultanovna Nazarbayeva; August 19, 1968 (age 57) Temirtau, Kazakh SSR, Soviet Union
- Spouse: Timur Kulibayev (m. 1990)
- Children: 3
- Parents: Nursultan Nazarbayev (father); Sara Nazarbayeva (mother)
- Education: Russian Institute of Theatre Arts (1989); KIMEP (1998); University of Canterbury
- Occupation: Economist

Dinara Nursultanqyzy Kulibayeva (née Nazarbayeva; Kazakh: Динара Нұрсұлтанқызы Құлыбаева, romanized: Dinara Nūrsūltanqyzy Qūlybaeva; born 19 August 1968) is a Kazakh billionaire, businesswoman, and the middle daughter of former Kazakh President Nursultan Nazarbayev. She is married to Timur Kulibayev, a Kazakh oligarch.

She is the second richest person in Kazakhstan, with a fortune estimated to be around $3.8 billion. During the 2022 Kazakh protests, she lost $200 million in fortune according to Forbes.

== Biography ==
Nazarbayeva was born in Temirtau, Kazakh SSR, Soviet Union. She comes from the Shaprashta clan of the Senior Zhuz.

She graduated from the Russian Institute of Theatre Arts in 1989 and received an MBA from KIMEP University in 1998. In 2007, she defended her doctoral dissertation on "Methodological foundations of the management of the educational system of international schools."

In 2009, she heads the National Education Fund named after Nursultan Nazarbayev.

== Personal life ==
She married Timur Kulibayev in 1990 and the couple have four children. Her husband is a prominent businessman in Kazakhstan, being the third-richest man in Kazakhstan and the 973rd-richest in the world.

== Awards and honors ==
- Order of the Leopard, 3rd class (Kazakhstan)
- Order of Parasat (Kazakhstan)
- Knight of the Ordre des Palmes académiques (France)
- Academician of the National Academy of Sciences of the Republic of Kazakhstan (2017)
