= Sara Nazarbayeva =

Former First Lady of Kazakhstan

- Сара Назарбаева
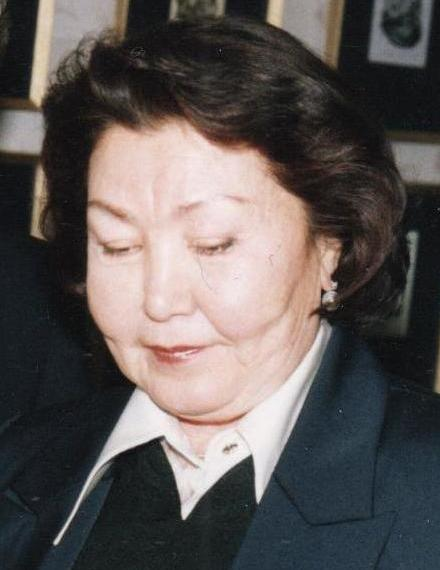
- Nazarbayeva in 2000

First Lady of Kazakhstan
- In role 16 December 1991 – 20 March 2019
- President: Nursultan Nazarbayev
- Preceded by: Position established
- Succeeded by: Nadezhda Tokayeva

13th Spouse of the Chairman of the Supreme Soviet of the Kazakh SSR
- In role 22 February 1990 – 24 April 1990
- Chairman: Nursultan Nazarbayev
- Preceded by: Vacant
- Succeeded by: Office disestablished

Personal details
- Born: Sara Alpysovna Konakayeva; 12 February 1941 (age 85) Kyzyl-Zhar, Kazakh SSR, Soviet Union
- Spouse: Nursultan Nazarbayev (m. 1962)
- Children: Dariga; Dinara; Aliya

Sara Alpysqyzy Nazarbayeva (née Konakayeva; (Note: Kazakh: Қонақаева, Qonaqaeva) Kazakh: Сара Алпысқызы Назарбаева [ˈsɑrɑ ɑɫpəsqəˈzə nɑzɑrˈbɑjɪvə]; born 12 February 1941) served as the First Lady of Kazakhstan and is married to former President Nursultan Nazarbayev. She married Nursultan in 1962 after her graduation. They have three daughters, Dariga, Dinara, and Aliya, and eleven grandchildren and a great granddaughter.

Nazarbayeva is the President of Böbek, an international children's foundation, which she founded in 1992. For her work with children she was awarded the Ihsan Dogramaci Family Health Foundation Prize by the World Health Organization in 1997 and the International Unity Prize.

== Biography ==
Sara Konakayeva was born on February 12, 1941, in the village of Kyzyl-Zhar, Karaganda Region (now part of Ulytau Region). When Sara was five years old, her mother passed away. At the age of twelve, she left school and began working at a garment factory.

In 1962, she married Nursultan Nazarbayev. They met while working together in the blast furnace shop of the Karaganda Metallurgical Plant, where Nazarbayev worked as a blast furnace operator and his future wife worked at the blast furnace electrical substation. They have three daughters: Dariga (born 1963) and Dinara (born 1967), who were born in Temirtau, and Aliya (born 1980), who was born in Alma-Ata (now Almaty).

From 1972 to 1976, she studied industrial planning at the Higher Technical Educational Institute affiliated with the Karaganda Metallurgical Plant in Temirtau. After graduating, she worked at the Karaganda Metallurgical Plant and later at the Karagandaugol coal production association.

Since February 1992, she has served as the founder and president of the republican children’s charitable foundation Bobek.

Since July 1994, she has been the president of the SOS Children’s Villages Kazakhstan Foundation, the national branch of the Austrian organization SOS Kinderdorf International.

In March 1999, she became Chair of the Board of Trustees of the Demography Charitable Foundation.

== Charity and public activities ==
=== Bobek Foundation ===
In 1992, Sara Nazarbayeva founded the Bobek Foundation, whose main objectives include protecting mothers and children, supporting orphanages and infant care homes, modernizing schools with contemporary equipment, assisting gifted children from low-income families, and promoting children’s healthcare.

In the same year, the foundation organized Kazakhstan’s first international telethon, “House of Joy and Hope,” with proceeds used to build the Bobek Children’s Health and Rehabilitation Center in Almaty.

In 1995, together with the Government of Kazakhstan and the United Nations Children’s Fund (UNICEF), the Bobek Foundation introduced the ASPERA Project (Aral Sea: Environmental and Regional Assistance Project), aimed at improving social conditions for mothers and children in the Aral Sea region of Kazakhstan.

In 2011, Sara Nazarbayeva signed an agreement providing targeted charitable assistance to children in educational institutions through the State Educational Savings System. Under this initiative, the Bobek Foundation opened free educational savings accounts for approximately 7,000 children living in orphanages. As a result, nearly 90% of orphaned children in Kazakhstan received guaranteed access to higher or vocational education, regardless of whether they received a state educational grant.

=== SOS Children’s Villages ===
In 1993, while visiting Munich, Sara Nazarbayeva toured an SOS Children’s Village established by SOS Kinderdorf International, where orphaned children lived in family-style homes with dedicated caregivers acting as mothers. Inspired by this model, she promoted its introduction in Kazakhstan. Later that year, an agreement was signed between the Government of the Republic of Kazakhstan and SOS Kinderdorf International. In 1994, the SOS Children’s Villages Kazakhstan Foundation was established, with Sara Nazarbayeva serving as its president.

The first SOS Children’s Village in Kazakhstan opened in Almaty in 1997, the second in Astana in 2000, and the third in Temirtau in 2004.

She also participated in drafting the Law on Family-Type Children’s Villages and Youth Homes, adopted in December 2000.

With Sara Nazarbayeva’s direct support, the Law on the Rights of the Child was also drafted and adopted in August 2002.
