= Aliya Nazarbayeva =

Kazakh businesswoman

- Әлия Назарбаева
- Born: 3 February 1980 (age 46); Almaty, Kazakh SSR, Soviet Union
- Education: University of Richmond; George Washington University; Kazakh State Law Academy; Al-Farabi Kazakh National University
- Occupations: Film producer; businesswoman
- Spouse(s): Aidar Akayev; Dimash Dosanov
- Children: 4
- Parents: Nursultan Nazarbayev (father); Sara Nazarbayeva (mother)
- Awards: State Prize of Kazakhstan

Aliya Nursultanqyzy Nazarbaeva (Kazakh: Әлия Нұрсұлтанқызы Назарбева, romanized: Älia Nūrsūltanqyzy Nazarbaeva; born 3 February 1980) is a Kazakh businesswoman who is the youngest daughter of Nursultan Nazarbayev, the first President of Kazakhstan.

== Biography ==
Graduated from the K. Baiseitova National Musical School in Almaty. Nazarbayeva studied at the International Relations Faculty of the Richmond University in London, UK, as well as at the International Relations Faculty of the George Washington University in Washington D.C.

In 2001 she graduated from the Law Faculty of the Kazakh State Law Academy with a degree in Legal Science. In 2016 by the decision of the State Attestation Commission of the Al-Farabi Kazakh National University the MBA degree was conferred on her in specialty “Economics. Innovation Economics & Management”.

== Career ==
Nazarbayeva heads a number of companies in Kazakhstan. She has come under criticism of being on the receiving end of nepotism through her father. It is alleged that her natural gas company receives preferential treatment in Kazakhstan. In 2005, police in Almaty confiscated the newspaper Svoboda Slova which carried "an article on allegedly aggressive business dealings by Aliya Nazarbayeva" through her construction company Elitstroi. In 2018, residents in Temirtau collected petitions regarding the polluted black snow to send Nazarbayeva. They were addressed to her due to her role as head of the Association of Ecological Organisations of Kazakhstan.

She is the producer of several documentary series. She produced The Road to Mother, 2016. The film received awards at six international film festivals, including the main prize of the international festival in Croatia and Grand Prix at the International Film Festival “Eurasian Bridge” and others.

== Personal life ==
She is married to Dimash Dosanov, the former general director of KazTransOil, the largest oil pipeline company in Kazakhstan and they have 4 children.

She had previously been married to Aidar Akayev, the eldest son of former Kyrgyz president Askar Akayev. According to the BBC the marriage was "seen by many people as a return to the old Central Asian tradition of cementing political ties with family ones."
