= Rakhat Aliyev =

Kazakh politician (1962–2015)

- Рахат Әлиев
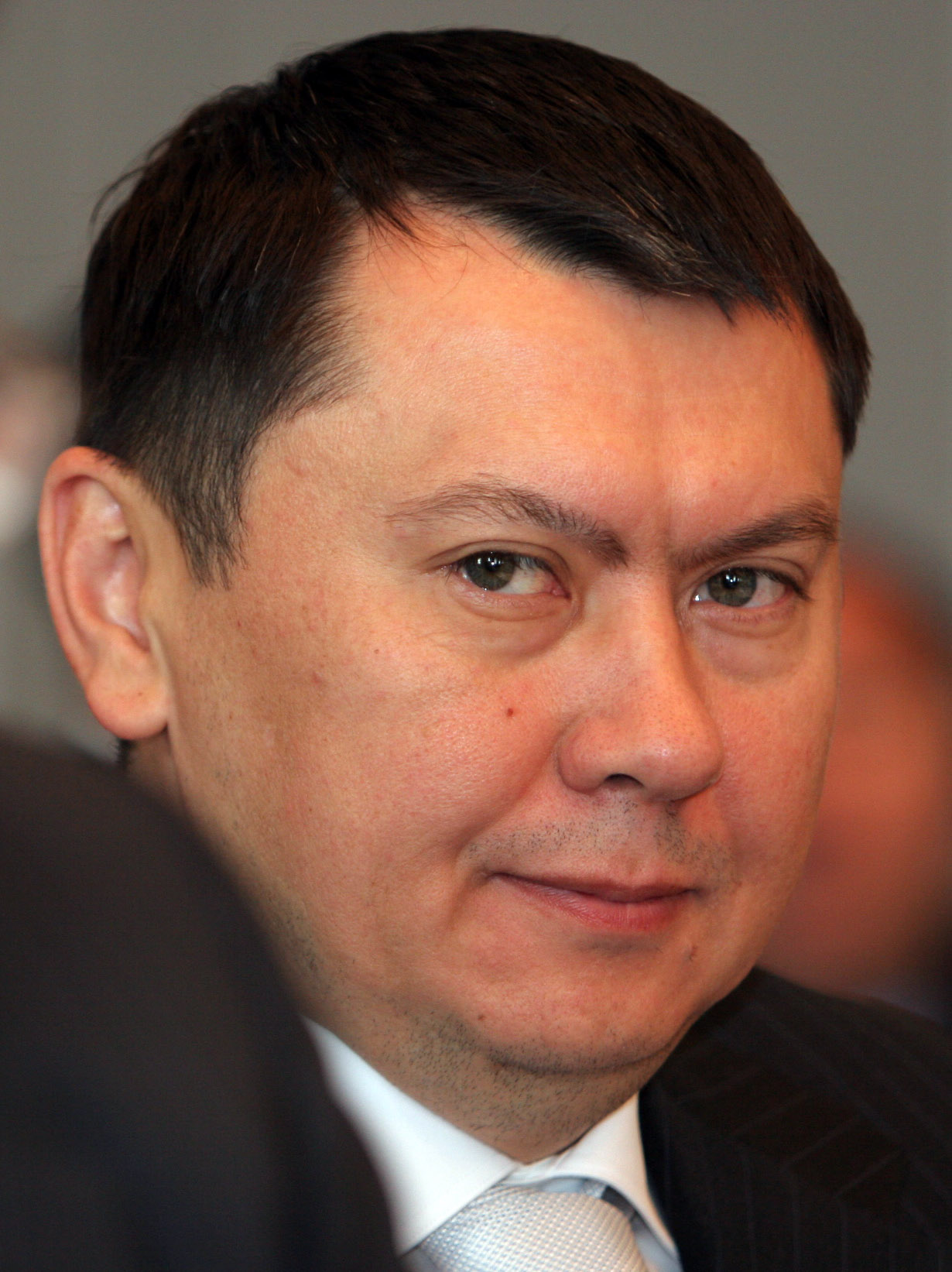
- Aliyev in 2007

Ambassador of Kazakhstan to Austria
- In office 21 June 2002 – 9 July 2005
- President: Nursultan Nazarbayev
- Preceded by: Saginbek Tursunov
- Succeeded by: Dulat Kuanyshev
- In office 9 February 2007 – 26 May 2007
- Preceded by: Dulat Kuanyshev
- Succeeded by: Kairat Abdrakhmanov

Ambassador of Kazakhstan to Macedonia
- In office 21 June 2002 – 9 July 2005
- President: Nursultan Nazarbayev
- Preceded by: Office established
- Succeeded by: Rashid Ibraev (2007)

Ambassador of Kazakhstan to Croatia
- In office 21 June 2002 – 9 July 2005
- President: Nursultan Nazarbayev
- Preceded by: Office established
- Succeeded by: Dulat Kuanyshev

Ambassador of Kazakhstan to Serbia and Montenegro
- In office 21 June 2002 – 9 July 2005
- President: Nursultan Nazarbayev
- Preceded by: Office established
- Succeeded by: Rashid Ibraev (2007)

Ambassador of Kazakhstan to Slovenia
- In office 21 June 2002 – 9 July 2005
- President: Nursultan Nazarbayev
- Preceded by: Office established
- Succeeded by: Dulat Kuanyshev

Personal details
- Born: Rakhat Mukhtarovich Aliyev (Рахат Мухтарович Алиев); 10 December 1962 Alma-Ata, Kazakh SSR, USSR
- Died: 24 February 2015 (aged 52) Vienna, Austria
- Spouses: Dariga Nazarbayeva (m. 1983; div. 2007) Elnara Shorazova (m. 2007)
- Children: 3, including Aisultan
- Education: law degree, 1997; Ph.D economics, 2005
- Occupation: surgeon; diplomat; politician; businessman
- Known for: Arrests for murder, kidnapping, money laundering

Rakhat Mukhtaruly Aliyev (Kazakh: Рахат Мұхтарұлы Әлиев, Rahat Mūhtarūly Äliev; 10 December 1962 – 24 February 2015) was a Kazakh politician and diplomat, who died in an Austrian prison awaiting trial on charges of murder. His trial was planned to start in Vienna in first half of year 2015. Austrian legal circles were giving much attention to this high-profile criminal case in which a former diplomat was facing murder charges.

He was chief of Kazakhstan's tax police, deputy chief of the KNB state security service (Kazakhstan's successor to the Soviet KGB), ambassador to Austria, and first vice foreign minister. While serving in those government posts, Aliyev amassed a fortune in the banking, oil refining, news media, telecommunications, and agricultural commodities sectors. He was born in Almaty.

In February 2007, he was appointed to his second tour as Kazakhstan's ambassador to Austria and to the Organization for Security and Cooperation in Europe, before being relieved of his post and losing his diplomatic immunity.

Until June 2007, Aliyev was married to Dariga Nazarbayeva, the eldest daughter of Kazakh President Nursultan Nazarbayev.

After hiding in Malta to avoid an Interpol warrant for his arrest, and attempting to gain Cypriot citizenship, Aliyev was taken into custody in June 2014 by Austrian authorities on charges that include kidnapping and murder. He was jailed at the Josefstadt prison pending trial, and was placed under watch as a suicide risk.

Aliyev, who portrayed himself as a dissident after falling out with Kazakhstan's leadership, said that he was not guilty and the charges against him were politically motivated.

== Early life and education ==
Rakhat Aliyev was born on December 10, 1962, in Almaty. He came from the kiyikshi branch of the jamanbay family of the qonyrat clan, Middle jüz.

On 7 October 1983, Aliyev married Dariga Nazarbayeva, daughter of the First Secretary of the Central Committee Communist Party of the Kazakh SSR, Nursultan Nazarbayev at the time.

== Career ==
In 1986, Aliyev became a surgeon at the Alma-Ata Medical Institute. He worked as a laboratory doctor at the Kazakh Research Institute of Surgery, and in 1986–1989 he was a clinical resident and postgraduate student at the 2nd Moscow Medical Institute. In 1989–1993 he was a senior and then leading researcher at the Kazakh Research Institute of Surgery.

In 1993, he was appointed as the Deputy Chairman of the External Economic relations of the Ministry of Healthcare. From 1993, he also headed many companies, including as the Director General of the "KazMedImport" trade company under the Ministry of External economic relations (1993–1995), the Director General of the "RR Kazakhstan — Trade and Financing Ltd." Joint Venture LLP and the President of the "Sugar Center" (Сахарный центр) holdings (1995–1996).

From December 1996, he served in various tax-related authorities, also being the Head of the Department for Combating Corruption and Smuggling. Since April 1997, he was the Head of the Tax Police Department of Alma-Ata and in November 1997, he became the Director of the Tax Police Department of the Ministry of Finance. Since October 1998, he was also the Chairman of the Tax Police Committee, First Vice-Minister of State Revenues of Kazakhstan. At the same time, in 1997, he graduated from the Higher School of Law "Adilet" in the specialty "lawyer-legal scholar" and interned at the FBI Academy.

Since September 1999, he served in the structures of the National Security Committee: as head of the department for Almaty and the Almaty Region, since July 2000, he was deputy and since May 2001, he was first deputy chairman of the National Security Committee.

Since November 2001, he was Deputy Chief of the Security Service of the President of Kazakhstan. In January 2002, he became President of the National Olympic Committee of Kazakhstan.

From June 21, 2002, to July 2005, he was the Ambassador of Kazakhstan to Austria and concurrently to Serbia and Montenegro; also represented the country in the OSCE and some other international organizations accredited in Vienna. At the same time, he was the Ambassador of Kazakhstan to Slovenia, Croatia, FYR Macedonia. On February 18, 2003, at a meeting of the OSCE Permanent Council, he officially put forward a bid for Kazakhstan's chairmanship of the OSCE in 2009, but the bid did not receive support from a number of OSCE members. Kazakhstan's success in advancing its bid for the OSCE chairmanship came only after Rakhat Aliyev was removed from all posts.

Since July 2005, he was the First Deputy Minister of Foreign Affairs of Kazakhstan and simultaneously since August 2005, he was the Special Representative of Kazakhstan for Cooperation with the OSCE.

Since February 9, 2007, he was the Ambassador of Kazakhstan to Austria, Permanent Representative of Kazakhstan to the OSCE and some other international organizations in Vienna.

In different years, he also headed the Federation of Water Sports of Kazakhstan (1996–2007), the council of the Public Foundation "Formation of Tax Culture" (1997–2001), the Kazakhstan Football Federation (June 1999 – August 2007), was the first vice president of the National Association of Taxpayers of Kazakhstan (January 1998 – January 2002).

== Criminal allegations ==
=== Money laundering ===
Aliyev's money was allegedly fed into two offshore companies, A.V. Maximus SA and Argocom Ltd, both based in the British Virgin Islands. From here, the money went into A.V. Maximus Holding AG, their parent company. Reportedly, A.V Maximus SA's British Virgin Island's affiliate received €24.8 million and US$91.4 million, while Agrocom received €15.6 million. The money was the directed into Armoreal Trading GmbH and S.T.A.R.T Management consulting GmbH, among other subsidiaries. Loans between these subsidiaries were then sent to Metallwerke Bender Rhineland, some of it via ITR Information Technology GmbH. Metallwerke Bender Rhineland (MBR) then paid it back through Armoreal trading, ultimately going to A.V. Maximus SA. Money was returned to A.V. Maximus SA as a return on investments, which enabled the money to be legally wired to A&P Power Ltd via A.V. Maximus Holding AG. A&A Poweris owned by A&P Power Holdings Ltd, which is housed in Nevis.

Aliyev moved to Malta with his second wife Elnara Shorazova; the two allegedly began to dissolve and reorganize their money laundering network. MBR was sold to a Dubai-based company in March 2010. Armoreal Trading was liquidated in December 2010 while an Austrian company known as Veitlissen transferred 2.4 million Euro to A&P Power Ltd. In March 2011, A.V. Maximus Holding was sold to A&P Power Ltd and renamed Zurich Asset management.

In 2005, the investigation into this arrangement began when Wiesbaden were reportedly alerted about Armoreal Trading's suspicious loan activity. Nothing came of the complaint and the issue lay dormant until spring 2007, when three Austrian banks, Schoellerbank AG, Privitnvest Bank AG and M&A Privatbank AG, reported transactions involving Aliyev's company to the Austrian Interior Minister. The timing of these reports coincided with the divorce of Aliyev with his first wife, the daughter of the President of Kazakhstan, and his falling out of favour with the ruling family. All of his enterprises’ bank accounts were then blocked. The money originated in the late 1990s, when Aliyev was head of the tax office in Kazakhstan.

According to reports, Aliyev amassed a large fortune through defrauding a variety of companies and services while enjoying protection as son-in-law of the President, one of which was the Kazakhstani state soccer team. All of the financial interests were placed inside START Management consulting GmbH, a Viennese-based firm. Between March 2006 and January 2007, €1 million in sponsorship money disappeared from START accounts. Despite this, the contract between the two companies was renewed in early 2007 and 403,000 euros were transferred to START's account.

=== Treason ===
The Kazakhstan government found Aliyev guilty of treason for attempting a coup against the Kazakh president.

=== Torture ===
Aliyev allegedly tortured the two bodyguards of Akezhan Kazhegeldin to get them to confess to a coup d'état. The two men, lbrayev and Afanasenko, claimed that in April 2000, Aliyev tortured them for a total of 48 hours wanting them to confess that Kazhegeldin had been plotting a coup in Kazakhstan against Nazarbayev. According to the lawyer of the two accusers, Lothar de Maizière, they addressed law enforcement of Malta demanding a criminal case but the authorities allegedly never followed through.

=== Murder ===
Aliyev was accused of killing the Kazakh opposition leader, Altynbek Sarsenbayev in February 2006 according to Kazakh prosecutors. In December 2013, prosecutors reportedly released findings that Aliyev ordered the assassination. January 2014, the office filed a notion to start a new case against Aliyev and the former head of National Security of Kazakhstan, Alnus Masayev, related to the involvement in the opposition leader's murder as well as his bodyguard and his lawyer.

Aliyev reportedly kidnapped two managers of Nurbank in 2007; their bodies were found in 2011. In 2008, the Kazakh court convicted him in absentia of commissioning the double murders.

In addition, Aliyev reportedly also tortured and killed a 23-year-old TV presenter Anastasiya Novikova. According to reports, Novikova's family lost contact with her in 2004, but waited for three years before reporting her missing, on 26 July 2007. Letters obtained between and her family identified Aliyev as the father of her daughter. Novikova reportedly married Danijar Esten of the Kazakh Embassy in Vienna to cover for Aliyev's dalliance. The daughter was taken away from Novikova shortly after her birth.

Aliyev denied the allegations against him and said they are politically motivated.

== Charges ==
Aliyev fled to Austria when he was being investigated for the murder of the two Nurbank managers. Before he was arrested, he was quickly appointed the new Kazakh ambassador to Austria on 9 February 2007 as a polite way to get him out of the country. While in Austria, Aliyev announced his candidacy for the upcoming Kazakhstan elections and criticized the sitting Kazakh President, Nursultan Nazarbayev. A full domestic Kazakh investigation began in May 2007 into Aliyev's activities.

As a result, his diplomatic passport was cancelled, as was his diplomatic immunity. Kazakhstan filed its first extradition request with Austria at this time. The domestic Kazak investigation concluded in January 2008 with Kazak courts sentencing Aliyev to 40 years of imprisonment in absentia. His crimes were kidnapping, treason and plotting a coup d'état against his father-in-law Nursultan Nazarbayev.

According to reports, "Kazakhstan requested his extradition from Austria twice, but was denied on both accounts, since Austria was unsure that Aliyev would get a fair trial in his home country."

He married Austrian citizen Elnara Shorazova and enjoyed free movement throughout Europe although being investigated on fraud charges in the Austria, Germany and Malta. European Commissioner Cecilia Malmstrom told reporters that the investigation on fraud charges was difficult because of the different criminal legislation within the European Union countries.

According to reports, in November 2013 Aliyev tried to open a bank account in Cyprus with an invalid account which alerted authorities. The following January, two members of the European Parliament made public calls to the European Commissioner to get Eurojust and Europol to assist with the ongoing criminal investigations.

In 2013, Aliyev's Austrian passport was canceled by the decision of Austrian Minister of Interior. He allegedly wanted to obtain citizenship in Cyprus because it was becoming "too hot" in Malta because of all the investigations.

== Arrest ==
Aliyev was arrested in June 2014 after he allegedly turned himself into authorities to cooperate with the murder investigation of the two bankers. His lawyer confirmed the arrest and said it took place at 11pm on 5 June 2014 on his way to the airport.

=== Prison ===
On 4 July 2014, Aliyev had been moved to a secure prison cell because of repeated attacks and threats by other inmates. He allegedly is forced to share a cell because of fear he might commit suicide. According to his lawyer, Manfred Ainedter, Aliyev complained that the other prisoners were asking for thousands of euros to leave him alone.

=== Protest ===
An international movement called JusticeForNovikova.com began with the intention to bring Aliyev to justice for killing Anastasiya Novikova. The group's participants range from “independent human rights activists, advocates of victims of domestic violence, women’s rights activists, and criminal justice activists." According to their website, the project is “an informal international social networking project” with "no formal organizational affiliation.”

The movement began on 19 June 2014, the 10-year anniversary of Novikova's death. On that day protest were held at Lowndes Square. Aliyev denounced the Justice for Novikova protesters as agents of the Kazakh secret services.

== Victimization ==
Aliyev denied all charges against him. According to reports, he claimed that he was prosecuted by the Kazakh government and think people after him are "in bed with Kazakhstan." According to an interview, he said that "criminal accusations that the regime has tried to hang on him are all fiction." He also said in the same interview that all the charges were "made up primarily by the leadership of the National Security Committee, the prosecutor general, the interior minister, and the whole power bloc of ministries.

He said that all his trials and sentencing were politically motivated and told newspapers that he would be willing to appear in Austrian courts, but feared that he would be kidnapped.

He also reportedly called the lawyer, Gabriel Lansky, who had been helping the bankers' widows and their campaigns to bring justice, as "fronts of the Kazakh regime." Aliyev was reported to have circulated forgeries of documents to defame those he sees as critics, including former British prime minister Tony Blair, former U.S. president Bill Clinton, former Austrian chancellor Alfred Gusenbauer and current President Heinz Fischer, former Polish president Aleksander Kwaśniewski, former Italian prime minister Romano Prodi, and former German chancellor Gerhard Schröder

=== Skype calls ===
However, according to Die Presse newspaper, Austrian authorities found Skype calls that undermine his claims. The obtained calls allegedly discussed the disappearance of the two Nurbank bank managers and the location of the bodies. In addition, his alibi during their disappearance was reportedly also discussed. The Skype calls also purportedly recorded Aliyev directing the fabrication of a specific forged document to discredit former British prime minister Blair and former Austrian chancellor Gusenbauer.

== Aliyev vs Nazarbayev ==
On 9 February 2007, President Nursultan Nazarbayev appointed Aliyev as Ambassador of Kazakhstan in Austria and Permanent Representative to the OSCE (Organization for Security and Co-operation in Europe) and other international organizations in Vienna. The move occurred days after Aliyev became embroiled in a controversy over the disappearance of two former executives of the Kazakh bank Nurbank. 6 February 2007 the Financial police said they were investigating two former managers (both resigned from their position on 22 January 2007) of Nurbank on suspicion of fraud. After the permission of President Nazarbayev to Kazakh law enforcement bodies to investigate this criminal case “without regard for rank”, Aliyev was accused of abduction and extortion at the end of May 2007. On 22 May, Nursultan Nazarbayev signed constitutional amendments that effectively allow him to become president-for-life, a move denounced by the opposition. Aliyev joined the chorus of critics, saying the amendments threaten to torpedo Kazakhstan's OSCE chairmanship bid. Aliyev accused Nazarbayev of "de facto usurping" power. Following Aliyev's denial and claims that he had fallen victim to political repression, Nazarbayev on 26 May issued decree No. 333 stripping his son-in-law of all official positions. Two days later, the Interior Ministry issued a new statement saying an international arrest warrant had been issued and investigators had been dispatched to Vienna, site of the OSCE's headquarters, to nab him. The new statement said charges involving criminal association, economic crimes, and kidnapping had been brought against Aliyev. 26 May 2007, Rakhat Aliyev was relieved of his position as Ambassador to Austria and stripped of his diplomatic immunity.

On 30 May, the Kazakh government formally asked Austria to arrest Aliyev for kidnapping and extradite him to Kazakhstan. Arrest warrants were being issued for others in the inner circle of this once-powerful man. On 30 May 2007 his diplomatic immunity was removed. In a statement, Aliyev described the charges as absurd and said he was the victim of a political witch-hunt. On 7 August 2007 a Vienna court rejected a request from Kazakhstan to extradite Aliyev and ruled against extraditing the son-in-law of Kazakh President Nursultan Nazarbayev, who was wanted on charges of kidnapping. The court said the Rakhat Aliyev would not be given a fair trial in his home country and his human rights could not be guaranteed if he were sent back home.

A criminal case against Aliyev and his accomplices ended in mid January 2008: abduction of three top managers of Nurbank in January 2007, the whereabouts of two of them is still unknown, and formation of an organized criminal group found guilty in raiding and document forgery. Almaty district court of Almaty sentenced Aliyev in absentia to 20 years in a high security prison with confiscation of property in this abduction case. The court also sentenced other people to lengthy prison terms. At the end of March 2008 Akmola Garrison Military Court found Rakhat Aliyev as a key person involved in preparations for a coup d'état and sentenced him to 20 years of imprisonment. Aliyev's sidekick Musayev, the ex- KNB chief, was also sentenced to 20 years of prison term. Aliyev and Musayev were found guilty under the following articles of the Criminal Code of the Republic of Kazakhstan: Article 168, Section 1 "Seizure of power through violence," Article 235, Section 4 "Formation and heading of an organized criminal group," Article 172, Section 4 "Illegal acquisition, disclosure of state secrets," Article 176, Section 3 "Embezzlement of some other's property," Article 251, Section 3 "Illegal trafficking of arms, ammunition and explosives," Article 255, Section 4 "Stealing of ammunition and explosives" as well as Article 380, Section 2 "Abuse of powers."

On 17 June 2011, the Vienna Provincial Court for Criminal Matters rejected a second request for extradition by Kazakhstan because it was not free from doubt that Mr Aliyev would not be persecuted on political grounds in Kazakhstan. Kazakhstan requested extradition to enforce the previously rendered convictions by the Almaty district court and the Akmola Military Court (see above).

In 2013, Aliyev published a book Godfather-in-law, in which he accused Nazarbayev of being responsible for the murders of the opposition leaders.

== Divorce and remarriage ==
On 13 June 2007, Aliyev was divorced from his wife, Dariga. He claimed that the divorce was carried out without his knowledge or consent.

"Today I received the information where it says I am divorced," Aliyev said Monday. "They stuck a fax with the information through the fence at my home at a quarter past midnight. ... They even falsified my signature on the document."

Aliyev had three children with Nazarbayev's eldest daughter, Dariga. "I spoke to my wife on the telephone," Aliyev said, showing papers saying his wife had asked for the divorce. "She said: 'My father pressured me very much,' and she couldn't do anything."

Their son Aisultan Nazarbaev (Russian: Айсултан Назарбаев; 26 August 1990 – 16 August 2020) became an outspoken critic of Nursultan Nazarbayev. He stated that he did not inherit his father's wealth because his father's wealth was stolen by Dariga and Alnur Mussayev also spelled Alnur Musaev (Russian: Альнур Мусаев).

Their son Nurali Aliyev (Russian: Нурали Алиев; b. 1 January 1985) is involved in finance and banking as an executive with Nurbank JSC (Russian: АО «Нурбанк») from March 2006 to July 2010 and since 1 June 2009 becoming a majority shareholder of Nurbank with a 56.38% stake held jointly with Dariga. Nurali Aliyev was named in the Panama Papers as having vast amounts of wealth held in offshore companies through Alba International and the Baltimore Alliance which are registered in the British Virgin Islands. In the spring of 2020, a United Kingdom court in London ordered him to prove the legal origin of over $100 million of his wealth associated with three firms registered in Panama, Netherlands Antilles, and Anguilla. He is married to Aida Berikovna (Russian: Аида Бериковна Имашева; b. 1984) who is the daughter of Berik Imashev.

On 23 June 2018, their daughter Venus (Russian: Венера; b. 2001) married Dalen Chaizhunusov (Russian: Дален Чайжунусов; b. 1995–1996, Almaty), a graduate of the Law Faculty at the Al-Farabi Kazakh National University.

Aliyev married his assistant, Elnara Shorazova, who held an Austrian passport, and assumed the masculine form of her surname, Shoraz, as his own name. The two fled to Malta, where the Maltese government seized their assets in connection with European money-laundering allegations in March 2014. Aliyev surrendered to Austrian authorities in June 2014. He and Elnara have a son.

== Death ==
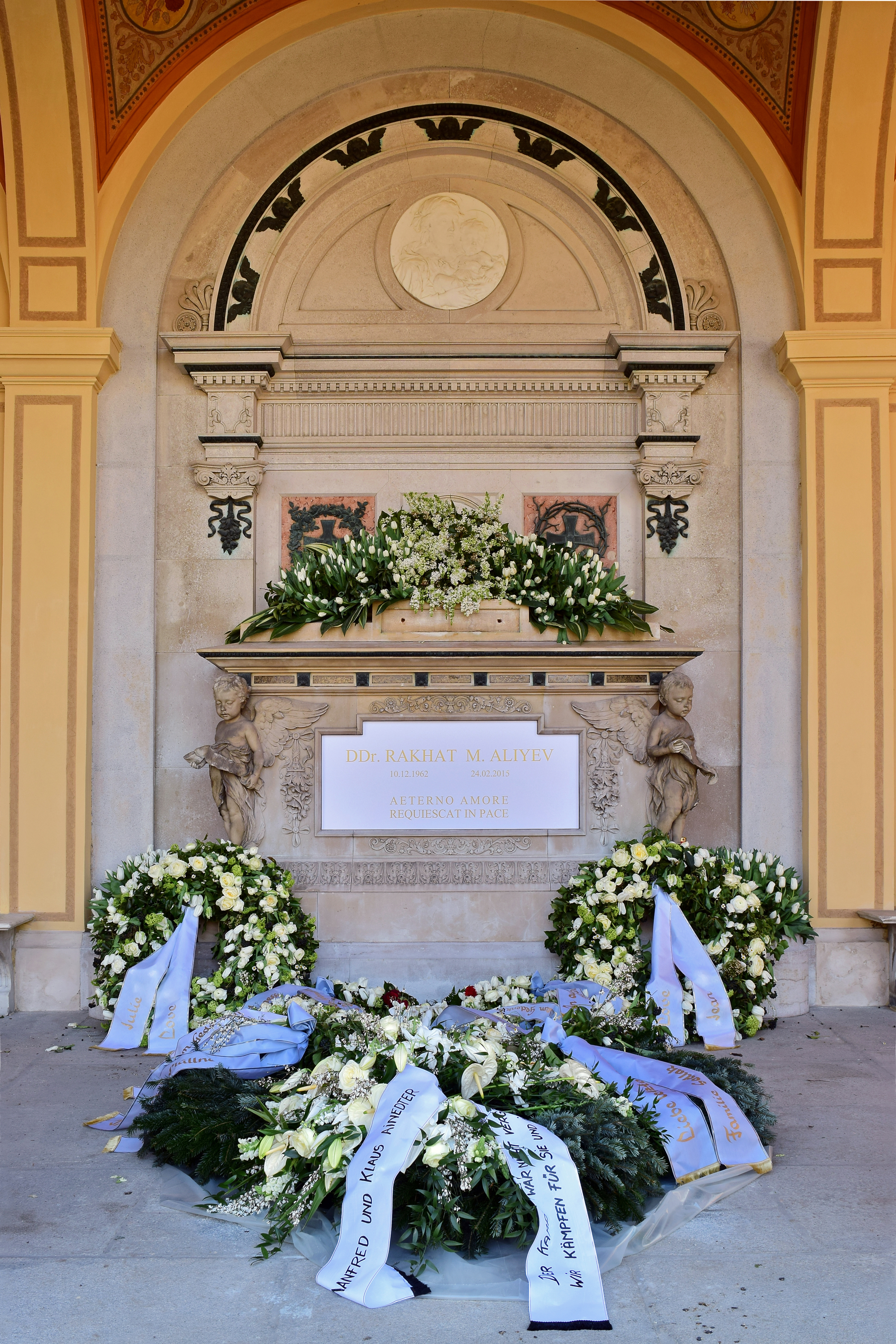
Aliyev's gravestone at the Vienna Central Cemetery

On 24 February 2015, on the 40th Day after death of his father, Rakhat Aliyev was found dead in the solitary cell of his Vienna prison. According to the official, Aliyev apparently committed suicide by hanging himself. However, his attorney, Klaus Ainedter, said he was highly suspicious of the death and expected a thorough investigation. "I have significant doubts about this without wanting to blame anyone. I visited him yesterday. There could be no talk whatsoever of danger of suicide," Ainedter said. The Federal Ministry of Justice (Austria) has officially confirmed the fact of Rakhat Aliyev's suicide in his prison cell. Thereafter Ministry of Foreign Affairs of the Republic of Kazakhstan reported that the law enforcement agencies of the Republic of Kazakhstan insisted on their participation in the investigation into the death of Aliyev. A 2016 independent report ruled out suicide and noted that his body showed traces of suffocation.

== Political views ==
In 2006, Aliyev called for the creation of a “British-style” constitutional monarchy in Kazakhstan, believing it would bring stability and liberal democracy to the nation. Aliyev argued that in adopting a republican form of government when it gained independence in 1991 as the Soviet Union collapsed, Kazakhstan defied its traditions.
