= Dariga Nazarbayeva =

Kazakhstani politician, former Chairwoman of the Senate of Kazakhstan

- Дариға Назарбаева
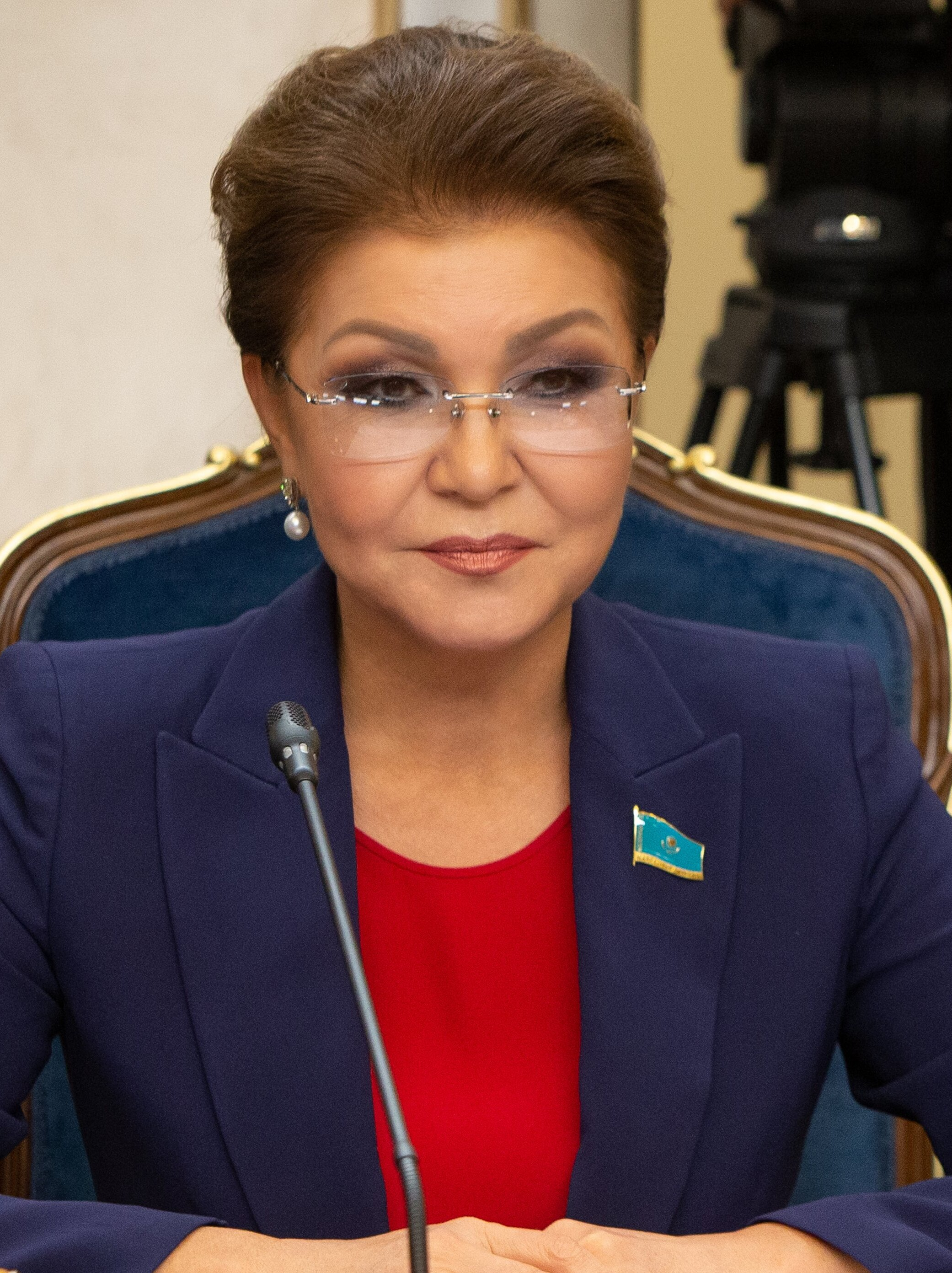
- Nazarbayeva in 2019

7th Chairwoman of the Senate
- In office 20 March 2019 – 2 May 2020
- Deputy: Sergey Gromov; Bektas Beknazarov; Asqar Şäkirov
- Preceded by: Kassym-Jomart Tokayev
- Succeeded by: Mäulen Äşimbaev

Deputy Prime Minister of Kazakhstan
- In office 11 September 2015 – 13 September 2016
- Prime Minister: Karim Massimov; Bakhytzhan Sagintayev

Member of the Senate
- In office 15 September 2016 – 2 May 2020
- Appointed by: Nursultan Nazarbayev

Deputy Chairwoman of the Mäjilis
- In office 3 April 2014 – 11 September 2015
- Chairman: Kabibulla Dzhakupov
- Preceded by: Kabibulla Dzhakupov
- Succeeded by: Abai Tasbolatov

Leader of Amanat in the Mäjilis
- In office 3 April 2014 – 11 September 2015
- Leader: Nursultan Nazarbayev
- Preceded by: Nurlan Nigmatulin
- Succeeded by: Kabibulla Dzhakupov

Member of the Mäjilis
- In office 15 January 2021 – 25 February 2022
- In office 15 January 2012 – 11 September 2015
- In office 19 September 2004 – 20 June 2007
- Constituency: Asar List

Chairwoman of Asar
- In office 25 October 2003 – 4 July 2006
- Preceded by: Office established
- Succeeded by: Office abolished

Personal details
- Born: Dariga Nursultanqyzy Nazarbayeva; 7 May 1963 (age 63) Temirtau, Kazakh SSR, Soviet Union
- Party: Amanat (2006−present)
- Other political affiliations: Asar (2003−2006)
- Spouse: Rakhat Aliyev (divorced 2007)
- Children: 3, including Aisultan
- Parent(s): Nursultan Nazarbayev; Sara Qonaqayeva
- Education: Moscow State University

Dariğa Nūrsūltanqyzy Nazarbaeva (Kazakh: Дариға Нұрсұлтанқызы Назарбаева; born 7 May 1963) is a Kazakh businesswoman and politician who is the daughter of Nursultan Nazarbayev who was the President of Kazakhstan from 1990 to 2019. She was a member of the Mäjilis from 2004 to 2007, 2012 to 2015 and 2021 to 2022. She was Deputy Chairwoman of Mäjilis from 2014 to 2015 until being appointed as a Deputy Prime Minister under Massimov's cabinet. She was a member of the Kazakh Senate from 2016 to 2020, serving as Senate Chairwoman from 2019 to 2020. She is one of the richest women in Kazakhstan.

Nazarbayeva began her career in 1994 in media business as she headed Khabar, the largest national television agency in Kazakhstan. In 2003, she founded the Asar party and the following year later in 2004 for the first time, Nazarbayeva was elected to the Mäjilis. While serving the post there, the Asar in 2006 merged with the Amanat, a ruling party that was led by her father Nazarbayev. Following the dissolution of the Mäjilis in 2007, Nazarbayeva did not run for re-election and remained out of politics until her eventual return in 2012 to the Mäjilis seat where she was the deputy chairwoman and parliamentary leader of Amanat. In 2015, Nazarbayeva was appointed by her father as Deputy Prime Minister under PM Karim Massimov before then returning to the Parliament in 2016 as a Senator. After her father's resignation from presidency in 2019, Nazarbayeva took over Kassym-Jomart Tokayev's role as the Senate Chairwoman, while Tokayev in turn, became the President of Kazakhstan. In 2020, she was unexpectedly removed from the post by Tokayev shortly before returning to the Mäjilis once more in 2021.

Because of Nazarbayeva's high-ranking official positions and relations with her father, it had been widely speculated that she was potentially being prepared for presidency as a way to succeed Nazarbayev's legacy in a nepotist fashion despite the dismissed claims by Nazarbayev himself.

== Early life and education ==
Nazarbayeva was born at Temirtau on 7 May 1963. In 1981–1982, she completed her secondary education at K. Satpayev Gymnasium No. 56 in Alma-Ata. From 1980 to 1983, she studied at the history department at Moscow State University. She graduated from the S. M. Kirov Kazakh State University in 1985, and in 1991, defending her thesis for a candidate degree in historical sciences at the Moscow State University. In 1998, Nazarbayeva defended her thesis for Ph.D degree in political sciences at the Russian Academy of State Service.

== Career ==
Nazarbayeva became the vice president of her mother Sara Nazarbayeva's Bobek Children's Charity Fund.

In 1994, Nazarbayeva became the vice president of the Television and Radio of Kazakhstan Republican Corporation. In 1995, the Khabar TV channel was created. The organizations associated to Nazarbayeva purchased the Europa Plus Radio Station, KTK and NTK television companies and popular newspaper Сaravan. TV-Media and Alma-Media companies were established to manage the new media holding. In 1998, Khabar was transformed into a closed joint-stock company, and Nazarbayeva became President of the Company, and in 2001, the Chairperson of the Board of Directors.

Since the late 1990s, Nazarbayeva has regularly appeared on Kazakh TV as a singer. Her repertoire includes Kazakh folk songs, Russian romances, opera arias and songs by Joe Dassin. In 2011, Nazarbayeva gave a recital “Salem, Russia” in Moscow on the new stage in the Bolshoi Theater, and the Organ Hall of Astana. A Russian company Universal Music filmed her concert performances at various venues for the musical television movie My Star. The two-part film was presented in 2012. In 2013, she gave a concert, co-organized by Count Pierre Sheremetev, at the Théâtre des Champs-Élysées in Paris, with the Orchestre Lamoureux directed by Dmitry Yablonsky and the Sazgen sazi group directed by Baghdat Tilegenov, and with some artists as the pianist Timur Urmancheev, Sundet Baigozhin or Medet Chotabaev.

== Political career ==
=== Chair of the Asar (2003–2006) ===
In October 2002, Nazarbayeva became the Chairperson of the Board of Trustees of the Choice of the Young People block; it was proposed to create the Congress of Youth of Kazakhstan at the first conference of the block.

In October 2003, Nazarbayeva organized and became the leader of the Asar Republican Party. In a few months, more than 167,000 applications were collected from those wishing to join Asar; 139,000 applications were processed and authenticated, and 77,000 signatures were submitted to the Ministry of Justice for registration. In December 2003, the party was registered.

According to the results of the elections to the Mäjilis in 2004, the party polled 541,239 (11.38%) votes on a party list basis and ranked the third; Nazarbayeva became an elected member from the Asar party-list in the Mäjilis, along with three deputies from the party who were elected in single-member constituencies.

On 4 July 2006, an extraordinary party convention was held where they decided to merge with the Otan Republican Political Party (later Nur Otan from December 2006), with Nazarbayeva being elected as the deputy chairwoman of Amanat under her father's chairmanship.

=== Parliamentarian career ===
==== Member of the Mäjilis (2004–2007, 2012–2015, 2021–present) ====
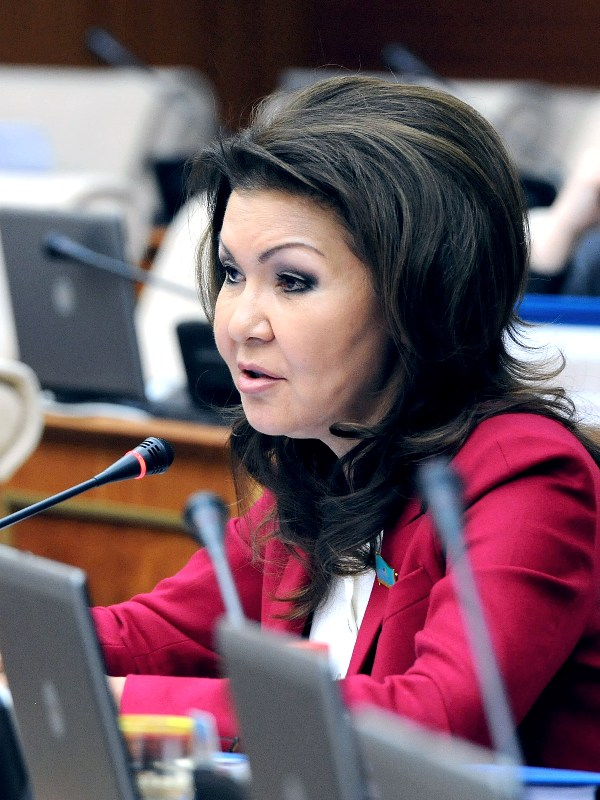
Nazarbayeva at the Mäjilis session, November 2012

In February 2005, a new Deputy Group of Aimak formed in the Parliament, consisting of 36 deputies (28 deputies from the Mäjilis and 8 deputies from the Senate). Nazarbayeva was elected as the group leader. The main goals of the Aimak Deputy Group were to promote and monitor the implementation of existing state and industry programs aimed at regional development, take an active part in the development and legislative support of administrative reform and local self-government and develop entrepreneurship. She remained as a member of the Mäjilis until its dissolution on 20 June 2007.

In the 2012 Kazakh legislative election, Nazarbayeva ran again in the Amanat party list which won 83 seats. She headed the Mäjilis Committee on Socio-Cultural Development.

On 3 April 2014, Nazarbayeva was unanimously chosen as a Mäjilis deputy chairwoman and the parliamentary leader of Amanat. On 11 September 2015, she was appointed as a Deputy Prime Minister.

Nazarbayeva reappeared on the Amanat party-list at a congress on 25 November 2020 where she made her first public appearance since being dismissed from the Senate Chairwoman post, bringing her candidacy to the Mäjilis seat again. The Amanat maintained its control over the Mäjilis following the 2021 legislative elections, sweeping 76 seats. From there, she became a member of the Committee for Economic Reforms and Regional Development.

==== Member of the Senate (2016–2020) ====
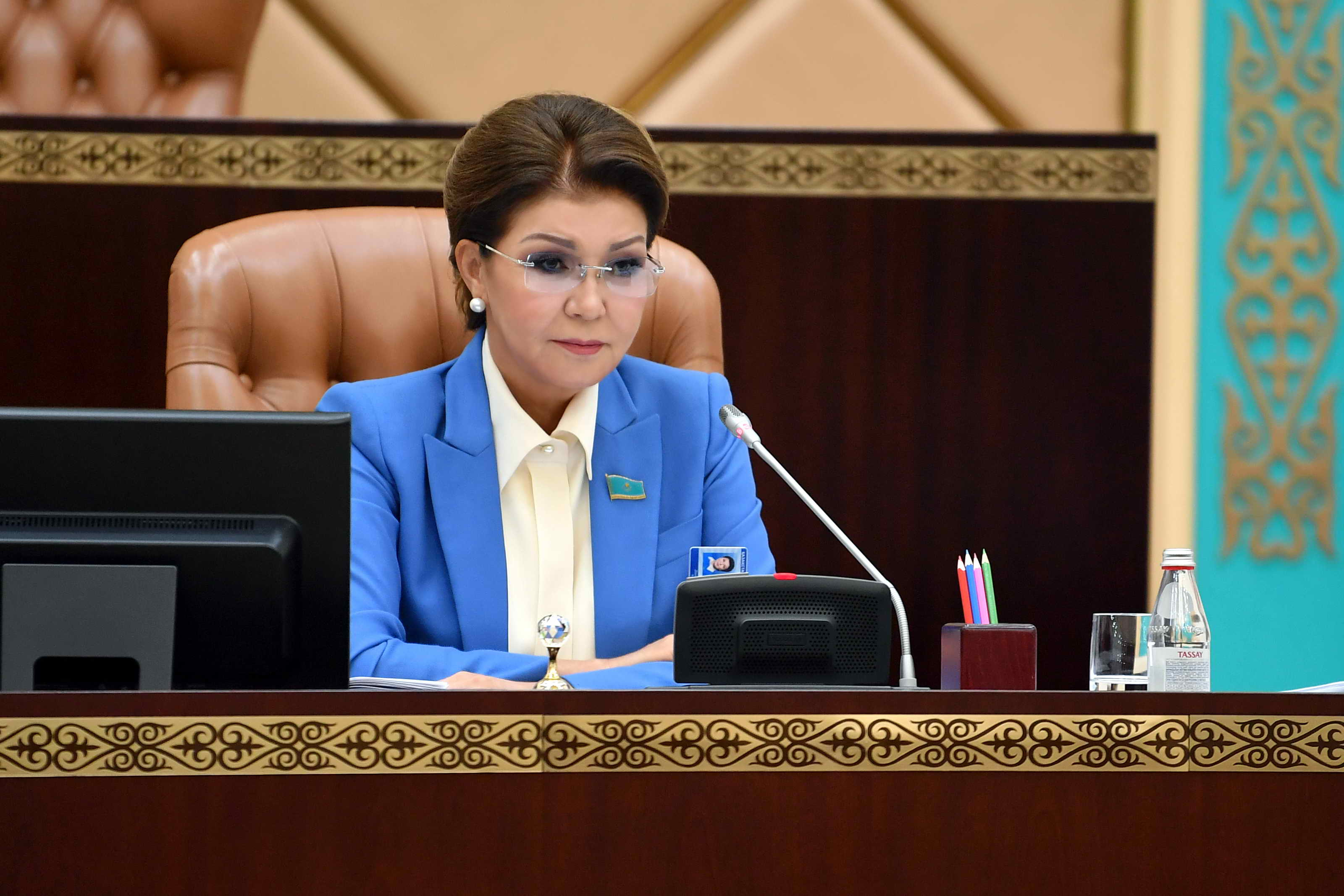
Nazarbayeva as the Senate Chairwoman

On 13 September 2016, Nazarbayeva was appointed to the Senate; she was designated as the head of the Senate's International Affairs, Defense, and Security Committee on 16 September.

==== Chairwoman of the Senate ====
On the same day her father stepped down as the President of Kazakhstan, Nazarbayeva was appointed as the Senate Chair in a unanimous secret ballot on 20 March 2019. She succeeded Kassym-Jomart Tokayev in that role, who became the acting president of the country. According to The New York Times, this may have been a signal that Nazarbayeva was being groomed to become president herself. Several speculations arose that Nazarbayeva was preparing her presidential bid for the 2019 presidential elections in which the allegations were revealed to be false according to her close aide on 9 April 2019.

On 2 May 2020, she was removed from the Senate and her role as the Chair by Tokayev. Many theories arose that either Tokayev was expanding his political influence or a sign of growing feud between Kazakhstan's ruling elite. Others claimed that the reason was due to public scandals regarding her son Aisultan and the British court case which ruined Nazarbayeva's reputation and her fathers image.

== Awards and decorations ==
- Kazakhstan:
  - Order of the Leopard, 1st class (2 December 2021)
  - Order of the Leopard, 2nd class (December 2013)
  - Order of Parasat (December 2004)
  - Astana Medal (17 August 1998)
  - Medal "10 Years of Independence of the Republic of Kazakhstan" (2001)
  - Medal "10 Years of the Parliament of the Republic of Kazakhstan" (7 November 2005)
  - Medal "10 Years of Astana" (6 May 2008)
  - Medal "20 Years of Independence of the Republic of Kazakhstan" (2011)
  - Medal "20 Years of Tenge" (September 2013)
  - Medal "20 Years of the Constitution of the Republic of Kazakhstan" (5 August 2015)
  - Medal of Nur Otan (3 May 2013)
  - Medal of the Constitutional Council of the Republic of Kazakhstan (30 August 2013)
  - Medal "20th Anniversary of the Assembly of the People of Kazakhstan" (14 March 2015)
  - Medal "25 Years of Independence of the Republic of Kazakhstan" (2016)
  - Medal "20 Years of Astana" (30 June 2018)
- CIS:
  - Order of the Commonwealth (2017)
  - Silver medal of the Inter-Parliamentary Assembly of the Commonwealth of Independent States, 20 years (27 March 2012)
  - Medal of the Inter-Parliamentary Assembly of the Commonwealth of Independent States, 25 years (27 March 2017)
- France:
  - Chevalier of the National Ordre des Arts et des Lettres (April 2009)

== Personal life ==
=== Family ===
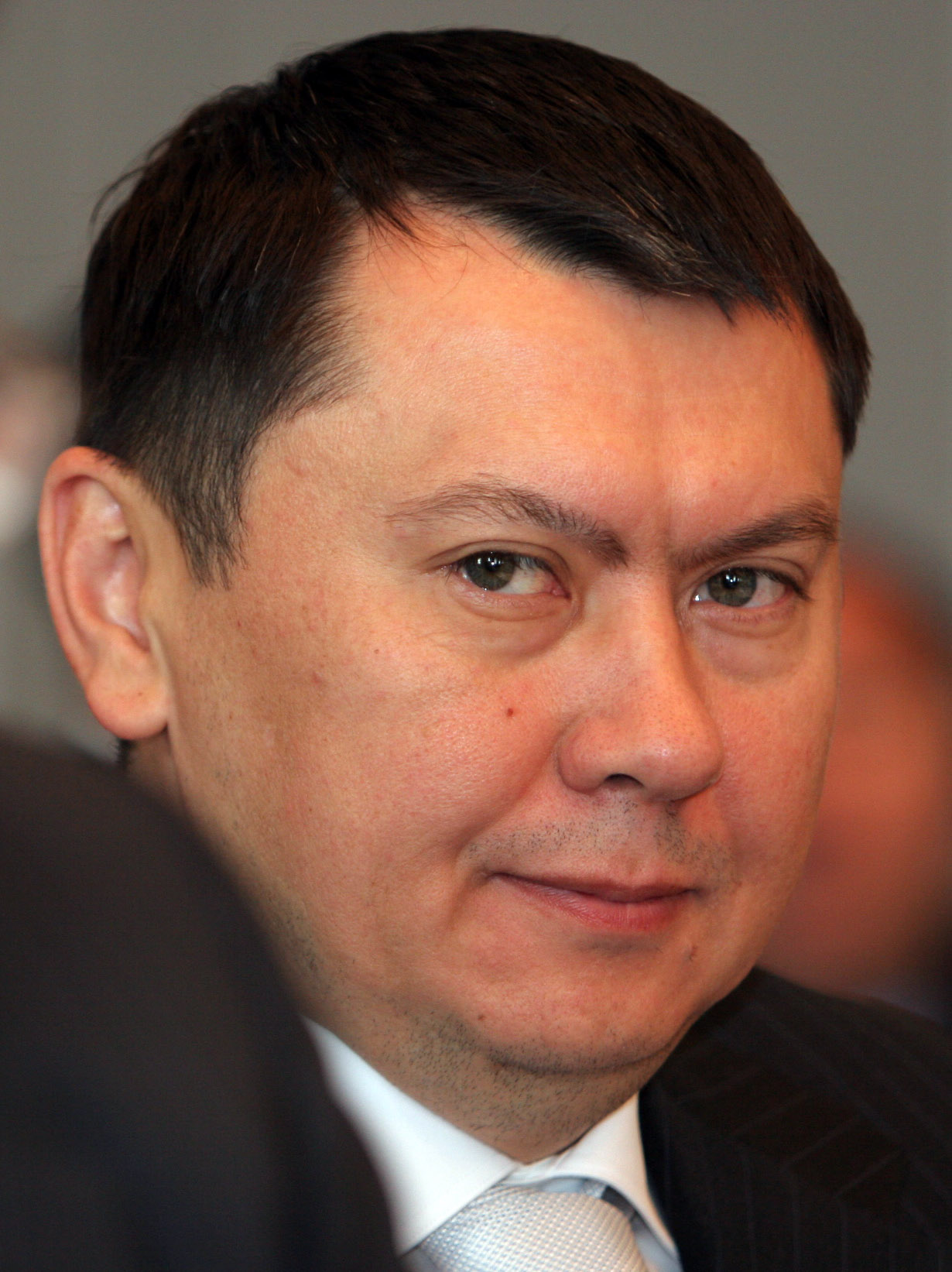
Nazarbayeva's former husband, Rakhat Aliyev in 2007

Nazarbayeva had a long marriage to Kazakh businessman and politician Rakhat Aliyev until their divorce in June 2007. Aliyev held senior posts in Kazakhstan's domestic intelligence agency and foreign ministry, and later as ambassador to Austria. In 2004, a woman alleged to be Aliyev's mistress was found dead, having fallen from a tall apartment building in Beirut. He was stripped of his titles in 2007 after critiquing President Nazarbayev for altering the nation's constitution to allow him to be president for life. Aliyev claimed that his divorce was executed without his consent, and that it was forced by Nazarbayev.

Aliyev was convicted in absentia for various crimes in Kazakhstan. Austria refused to extradite him, but were preparing to try him for the kidnapping and murder of two Kazakh bank officials. Before the trial, he was found dead in his Austrian jail cell due to alleged suicide.

Nazarbayeva has two sons with Aliyev, Nurali and Aisultan, and a daughter Venera. She is also a grandmother. Nurali's wife gave birth to Laura Aliyeva in 2013.

On 23 January 2020, Nazarbayeva's son, Aisultan, made a public statement on his Facebook page, claiming that his grandfather Nazarbayev was allegedly his father, and that his mother Nazarbayeva has been attempting to kill him while living in London. Nazarbayeva made no responses regarding the case made by her son. The next day on 24 January, a female correspondent from the RFE/RL attempted to receive response from Nazarbayeva regarding her son's claims as she was walking by in the Parliament building hallway where one of Nazarbayeva's security guards ended up grabbing the reporter by the arm and covering her mouth. On 16 August 2020, Aisultan was found dead in London with the cause of his death being allegedly due to cardiac arrest. In response to the incident, Nazarbayeva stated that "my family is devastated at the loss of our beloved Aisultan and we ask for privacy at this very difficult time."

=== Offshore activities ===
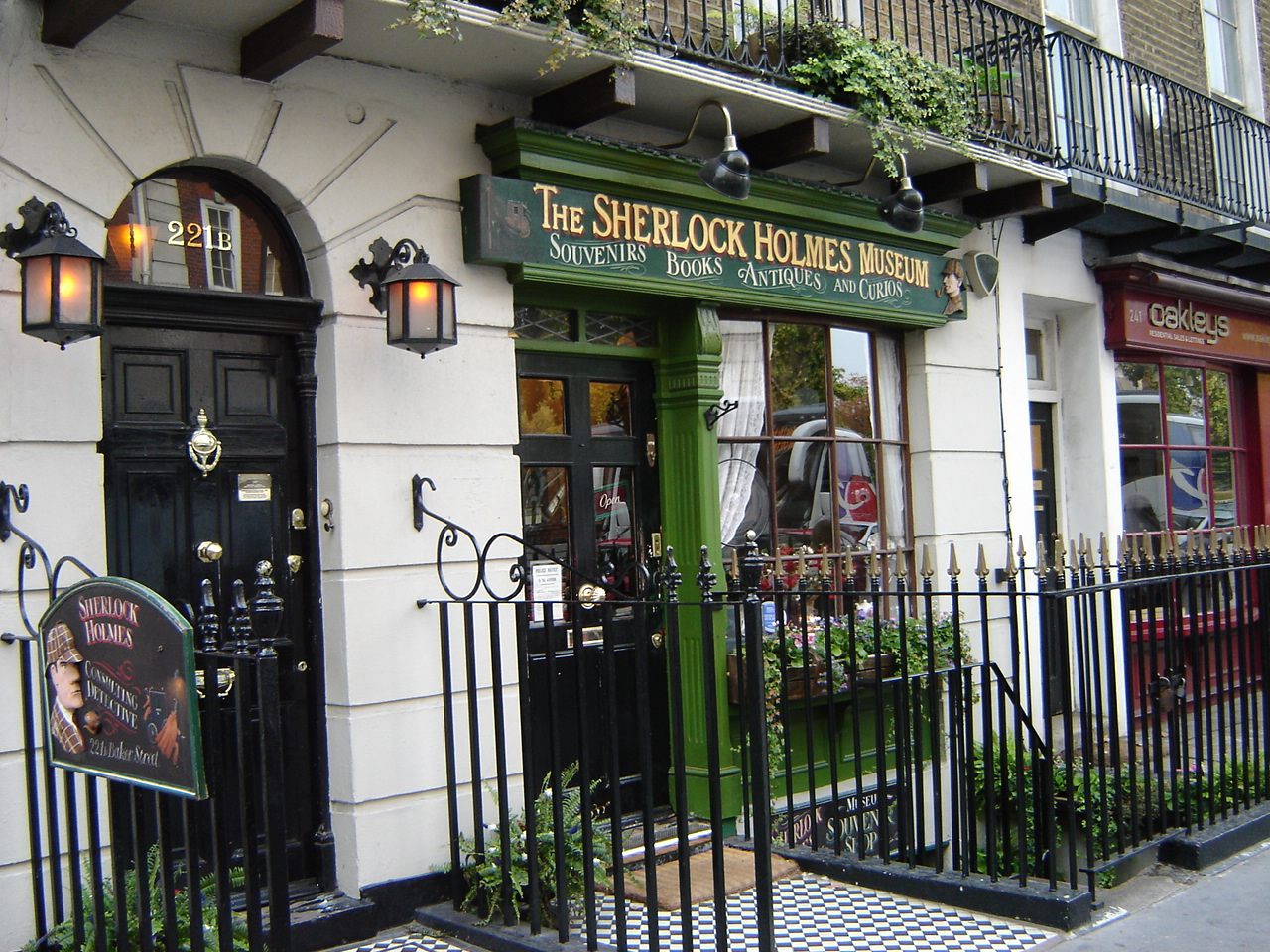
221B Baker Street, also known as the Sherlock Holmes Museum, is believed to be owned by Nazarbayeva

In 2018, it was revealed by the Panama Papers that Nazarbayeva was the sole shareholder of an off-shore sugar company based in the British Virgin Islands which did business in Kazakhstan. Her son, Nurali, was also named in the papers as being a client of Mossack Fonseca in Panama, and having two companies and luxury yacht also registered in the British Virgin Islands. According to Newsweek, "this is a sharp contradiction from Nazarbayev's frequent appeals to entrepreneurs in the oil-rich country to pay taxes in Kazakhstan." The Panama Papers also suggest she may be the owner, through an off-shore company, of 221B Baker Street, the $183 million property famous as being the fictional address of Sherlock Holmes.

On 10 March 2020, a British court announced the names of the owners of properties worth $100 million, which were issued an UWO in the spring of 2019. The owners turned out to be Nazarbayeva and her eldest son, Nurali Aliyev, with his wife Aida. The representative of the defendants at the hearing explained that the owners can confirm the source of the funds, since at that time they were engaged in business. In April, the High Court of Justice declared the claims by the British law enforcement agencies unfounded and as a result, the case was overturned.

=== Wealth ===
According to Forbes Magazine in 2013 her wealth was about $595 million. It was through her involvement in the companies such as Europe Plus Kazakhstan JSC, NTK, AlmaInvestHolding, Almatystroysnab LLP, and ALMA TV. She also founded Kazakhstan's main TV network, Khabar Agency.
