= List of companies of Kazakhstan =

Location of Kazakhstan

Kazakhstan is a transcontinental country in northern Central Asia and Eastern Europe. Kazakhstan is the world's largest landlocked country, and the ninth largest in the world, with an area of 2,724,900 square kilometres (1,052,100 sq mi). Kazakhstan is the dominant nation of Central Asia economically, generating 60% of the region's GDP, primarily through its oil/gas industry. It also has vast mineral resources.

Kazakhstan was the last of the Soviet republics to declare independence following the dissolution of the Soviet Union in 1991. The former President, Nursultan Nazarbayev, was the leader of the country until 2019, and was characterised as authoritarian, with a government history of human rights abuses and suppression of political opposition. Kazakhstan has worked to develop its economy, especially its dominant hydrocarbon industry.

For further information on the types of business entities in this country and their abbreviations, see "Business entities in Kazakhstan".

== Notable firms ==
This list includes notable companies with primary headquarters located in the country. The industry and sector follow the Industry Classification Benchmark taxonomy. Organizations which have ceased operations are included and noted as defunct.

Notable companies Status: P=Private, S=State; A=Active, D=Defunct
Name	Industry	Sector	Headquarters	Founded	Notes	Status	
Air Astana	Consumer services	Airlines	Almaty	2001	Flag carrier airline	S	A
Berkut Air	Consumer services	Airlines	Astana	2000	Charter airline	P	A
Bogatyr Access Komir	Basic materials	Coal	Ekibastuz	1913	Coal mining	P	A
BTA Bank	Financials	Banks	Almaty	1991	Bank	P	A
Ekibastuz GRES-2 Power Station	Utilities	Conventional electricity	Ekibastuz	1987	Coal	P	A
Eurasian Bank	Financials	Banks	Almaty	2015	Bank	P	A
Euro-Asia Air	Consumer services	Airlines	Atyrau	1997	Airline	P	A
Halyk Bank	Financials	Banks	Almaty	1923	Commercial bank	P	A
KazakhGold	Basic materials	Gold mining	Stepnogorsk	2005	Gold mining	P	A
Kazakhmys	Basic materials	Nonferrous metals	Almaty	1992	Copper mining	P	A
Kazatomprom	Utilities	Conventional electricity	Astana	1997	State-owned nuclear power	S	A
Kazkommertsbank	Financials	Banks	Almaty	1990	Private bank	P	A
KazMunaiGas Exploration Production	Oil & gas	Exploration & production	Astana	2004	Oil and gas exploration	P	A
KazMunayGas	Oil & gas	Exploration & production	Astana	2002	State-owned oil and gas	S	A
Kazpost	Industrials	Delivery services	Astana	1883	Postal administration	S	A
Kazakhstan Temir Joly	Industrials	Railroads	Astana	1997	Railways	S	A
Kazakhtelecom	Telecommunications	Fixed line telecommunications	Astana	1994	State-owned telecommunications	S	A
KazTransOil	Oil & gas	Pipelines	Astana	1997	Oil transport	P	A
Kazzinc	Basic materials	Nonferrous metals	Oskemen	1997	Mining	P	A
KEGOC	Utilities	Conventional electricity	Astana	1997	Power grid	S	A
SCAT	Consumer services	Airlines	Shymkent	1997	Airline	P	A
Semeyavia	Consumer services	Airlines	Semey	1991	Airline, defunct 2013	P	D
Tengizchevroil	Oil & gas	Exploration & production	Atyrau	1993	Joint-venture oil (ExxonMobil, Chevron, KazMunayGas, LukArco)	P	A
Vostochny Coal Mine	Basic materials	Coal	Ekibastuz	1985	Coal mining	P	A
Zamanbank	Financials	Banks	Almaty	1991	Regional bank	P	A

Headquarters of KazMunayGas, Kazakhstan's national oil and gas company.

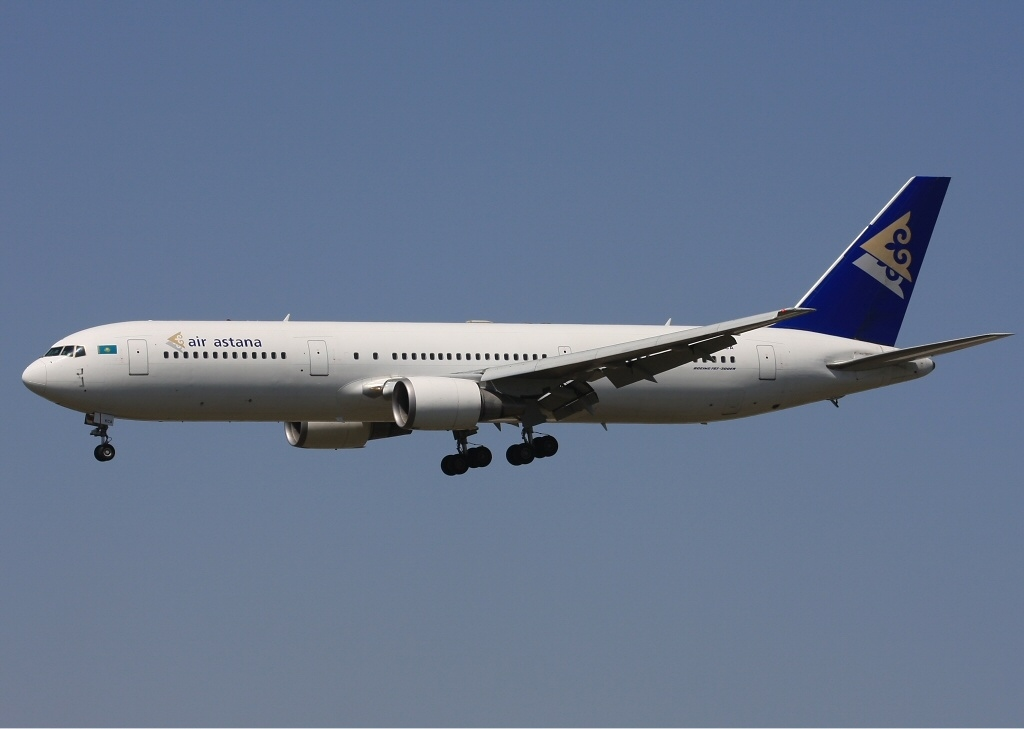
Air Astana Boeing 767-300ER.
