= List of banks in Kazakhstan =

The Republic of Kazakhstan has a two-tier banking system.

== Tier One Bank ==
The National Bank of the Republic of Kazakhstan is the central bank of Kazakhstan and presents the upper (first) tier of the banking system of Kazakhstan. The National Bank represents, within the limits of its authority, the interests of the Republic of Kazakhstan in the relationship with the central banks, with banks of other countries, in the international banks and other financial-credit organizations.

== Second-tier banks ==
All banks operating in the country, except the National Bank of Kazakhstan, represent the second tier of the banking system and are second-tier banks. The legal basis for operation of the second-tier banks is the law «On Banks and Banking in the Republic of Kazakhstan» from August 31, 1995, No. 2443. According to this law, a second-tier bank in Kazakhstan is a corporate entity which, irrespective of the form of ownership, carries on business for achieving its main goal of earning profits. Second-tier banks are entitled to open their subsidiary banks, branch and representative offices on the territory of Kazakhstan as well as outside of the territory of the country. Banks on April 13, 2022 there are 22 (10 of them are with foreign capital, the share of which is only 17.1%).

Data for January 1, 2024
No.	Bank's name	Controlling stakeholder	Bank assets as of January 1, 2024 (billion tenge)
1	Halyk Savings Bank of Kazakhstan	(Kazakhstan) Holding Group ALMEX JSC	14943
2	Kaspi Bank	(Kazakhstan) Kaspi Group JSC	6689
3	Bank CenterCredit	(Kazakhstan) Bakhytbek Rymbekovich Baiseitov	5261
4	Otbasy bank	(Kazakhstan) National Investment Holding Baiterek JSC	3996
5	ForteBank	(Kazakhstan) Bulat Zhamitovich Utemuratov	3444
6	Jusan Bank	(Kazakhstan) First Heartland Securities JSC	2869
7	Eurasian Bank	(Kazakhstan) Eurasian Financial Company JSC	2759
8	Freedom Bank Kazakhstan	(Kazakhstan) Freedom Finance JSC	2211
9	Bereke Bank	(Kazakhstan) National Managing Holding «Baiterek» JSC	2076
10	Bank RBK	(Kazakhstan) KCC Financ LLP	2044
11	Citibank Kazakhstan	(United States) Citibank, N.A.	1087
12	Altyn Bank	China CITIC Bank Corporation	889
13	Home Credit Bank Kazakhstan	(Russia) Home Credit and Finance Bank LLC	803
14	Shinhan Bank Kazakhstan	(South Korea) Shinhan Bank	475
15	Nurbank	(Kazakhstan) JP Finance Group LLP	466
16	Bank of China in Kazakhstan	Bank of China Limited	417
17	Industrial & Commercial Bank of China (Almaty)	Industrial and Commercial Bank of China	349
18	KZI Bank	(Turkey) T.C. Ziraat Bankası A.Ş.	233
19	VTB Bank Kazakhstan	(Russia) PJSC VTB Bank	226
20	Al Hilal Islamic Bank	(United Arab Emirates) Al Hilal Bank PJSC	178
21	Zaman-Bank	(Kazakhstan) Tasbulat Abguzhinov	25

== Development Bank of Kazakhstan ==
Development Bank of Kazakhstan JSC operates as a national development institution in the Republic of Kazakhstan. The company’s services include investment projects funding, export operations financing, interbank lending, clients operational servicing, and lease financing. It also offers various financial services, such as mezzanine, syndicated, interim, lease transactions, and project financing; lending of current activities; and provision of guarantees, as well as equity and capital participation.

== Deposit Guarantee System ==
Kazakhstan Deposit Insurance Fund (the KDIF) was established by Resolution of the National Bank of the Republic of Kazakhstan Management Board No. 393 dated 15 November 1999 “On incorporation of «Kazakhstan Individuals’ Deposit Guarantee (Insurance) Fund».

Individuals’ deposits placed in the second-tier banks of the Republic of Kazakhstan, excluding non-interest bearing demand deposits placed with the Islamic banks.

- Deposits in tenge are insured up to 10 million tenge per depositor per bank
- Deposits in foreign currency are insured up to 5 million tenge per depositor per bank (in equivalent, foreign exchange rate applied as of the date of effect of the court ruling regarding forced liquidation of a deposit insurance system member bank)

At present the Parliament of the Republic of Kazakhstan has approved the draft law which stipulates deposit coverage payouts on the individuals’ and individual entrepreneurs’ savings deposits up to the deposit coverage limit of 15 million tenge.

== Population deposits ==
In August 2018 the number of deposits of individuals has reached the historic peak - 8.3 trillion tenges, 47% of the total volume of deposits.
