= Home credit =

Home Credit is an international non-bank, consumer finance group founded in 1997 in the Czech Republic.

Home credit may also refer to:

- Home Credit & Finance Bank, a Russia's subsidiary of Home Credit Group B.V.
- Home equity line of credit, a type of loan in which the borrower uses a home as collateral
- Home Credit Bank, a bank in Kazakhstan, a Kazakhstan's subsidiary of Home Credit Group B.V.
- Home Credit Bank, a bank in Belarus, a subsidiary of Home Credit Group B.V. Which was sold to Alfa Bank Group
- Home credit, an alternative financial service in the UK.
- Home Credit Arena
