= Barlykzhan Nukenov =

Kazakhstani businessman and investor (born 1960)

- Born: Barlykzhan Kudaibergenuly Nukenov; 2 March 1960 (age 65); Kazakh SSR, USSR

Barlykzhan Nukenov (Kazakh: Барлыкжан Кудайбергенұлы Нукенов, Barlykjan Kýdaıbergenuly Nýkenov; born 2 March 1960) is a Kazakhstani businessman and investor. Nukenov owns several companies in his home country and previously served as the deputy governor of the Karaganda Region.

== Biography ==
Barlykzhan Nukenov was born on 2 March 1960 in the Karaganda Region of the Kazakh SSR. He attended the Supreme Interior Ministry Academy of USSR (Russian: Высшая Школa МВД СССР) and holds a B.A. in economics from Karaganda State University. After completing his studies, Nukenov worked in various law-enforcement departments of the Karaganda Region.

== Political and business activity ==
From 1990 to 1997, Nukenov served as a Chief of Financial Guard of the Karaganda Region. Nukenov served as the deputy governor of Karaganda Region from 1997 to 1999. Then, from 1999 to 2004, Nukenov served as an executive director of Kazkommertsbank. Since 2004, Nukenov works in the private sector as a businessman and investor. In 2005, he founded Tam Kurylys (Russian: Там Курылыс), a construction company that specializes in the development of low-income housing. In 2014, Nukenov co-founded Agrostan Farms (Russian: ТОО Агростан) a livestock company specializing in wholesale and export of meat products. Nukenov also invests in various projects in and outside of Kazakhstan.

== Personal life ==
Nukenov is married and has two sons.
