= Rustam Karagoishin =

Kazakh politician (born 1983)

- Рустам Қарағойшин
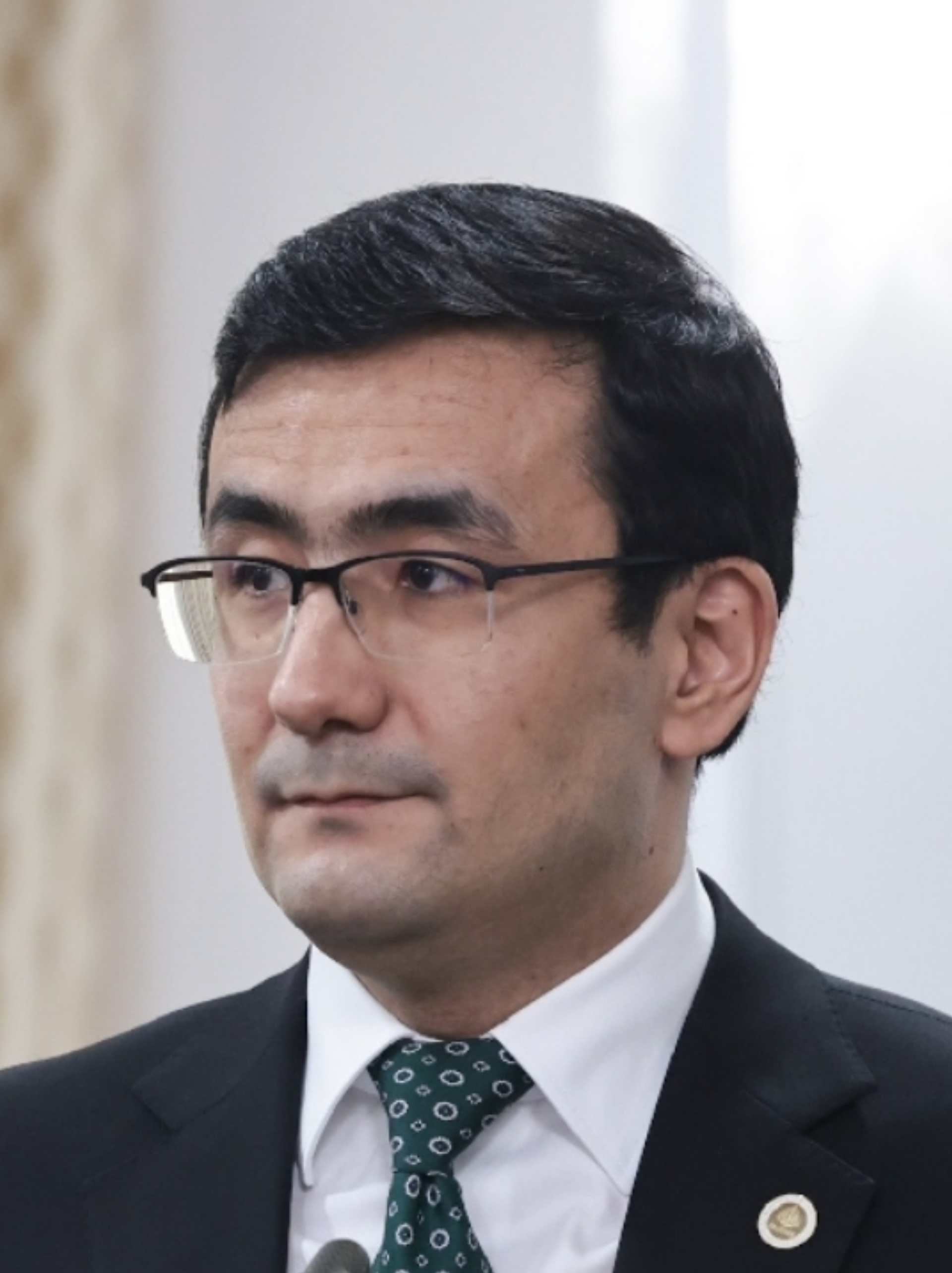
- Karagoishin in 2025

Chairman of Baiterek Holding
- Incumbent
- Assumed office 9 February 2024
- President: Kassym-Jomart Tokayev
- Prime Minister: Olzhas Bektenov
- Preceded by: Nurlan Baibazarov

Personal details
- Born: 6 September 1983 (age 42) Kazakh SSR, Soviet Union
- Education: KIMEP University; Almaty Management University

Rustam Timurovich Karagoishin (September 6 1983, Kazakh SSR) is a Kazakh politician, top manager, businessman, since 2024 the Chairman of the Board of Baiterek Holding.

== Biography ==
Karagoishin was born in 1983. He graduated from KIMEP University and International Business Academy, holds a Master of Business Administration degree.

Karagoishin began his career in 2004 at Development Bank of Kazakhstan (a subsidiary of Baiterek Holding), where he worked as a manager, general manager and head of the project analysis department. From 2007 to 2011, he was transferred to the position of Managing Director - Member of the Board of Directors of JSC DBK-Leasing.

In 2011-2015, Karagoishin worked as Head of the Foreign Economic Activity Department of the Oil and Oil Products Marketing Department of Petroleum Operating, Chairman of the Board of Credit Systems, Deputy General Director, General Director of Sberbank Leasing.

From 2015 to February 2019, he held the position of Deputy Chairman of the Board of KazAgroFinance.

From February to May 2019, he was the General Director of Grain Consortium of Kasakhstan.

From 2019 to 2021, Karagoishin served as Deputy Chairman of the Management Board Baiterek Holding, during which time he was a member of the Board of Directors of Damu Entrepreneurship Development Fund Development Bank of Kazakhstan.

From 2021 to 2024, he served as General Director of Grain Consortium of Kasakhstan.

On February 9, 2024, he was appointed Chairman of the Board of Directors of Baiterek Holding.

== Business activities ==
According to Forbes Kazakhstan magazine, As of 2023, he was CEO of Grain Consortium of Kazakhstan, owned Ushtobe Et LLP, and co-owned QZQ Development LLP, KTK Group LLP, Kazakh Agro Production.
