= Arman Şaqqaliev =

Kazakh politician

- Арман Шаққалиев
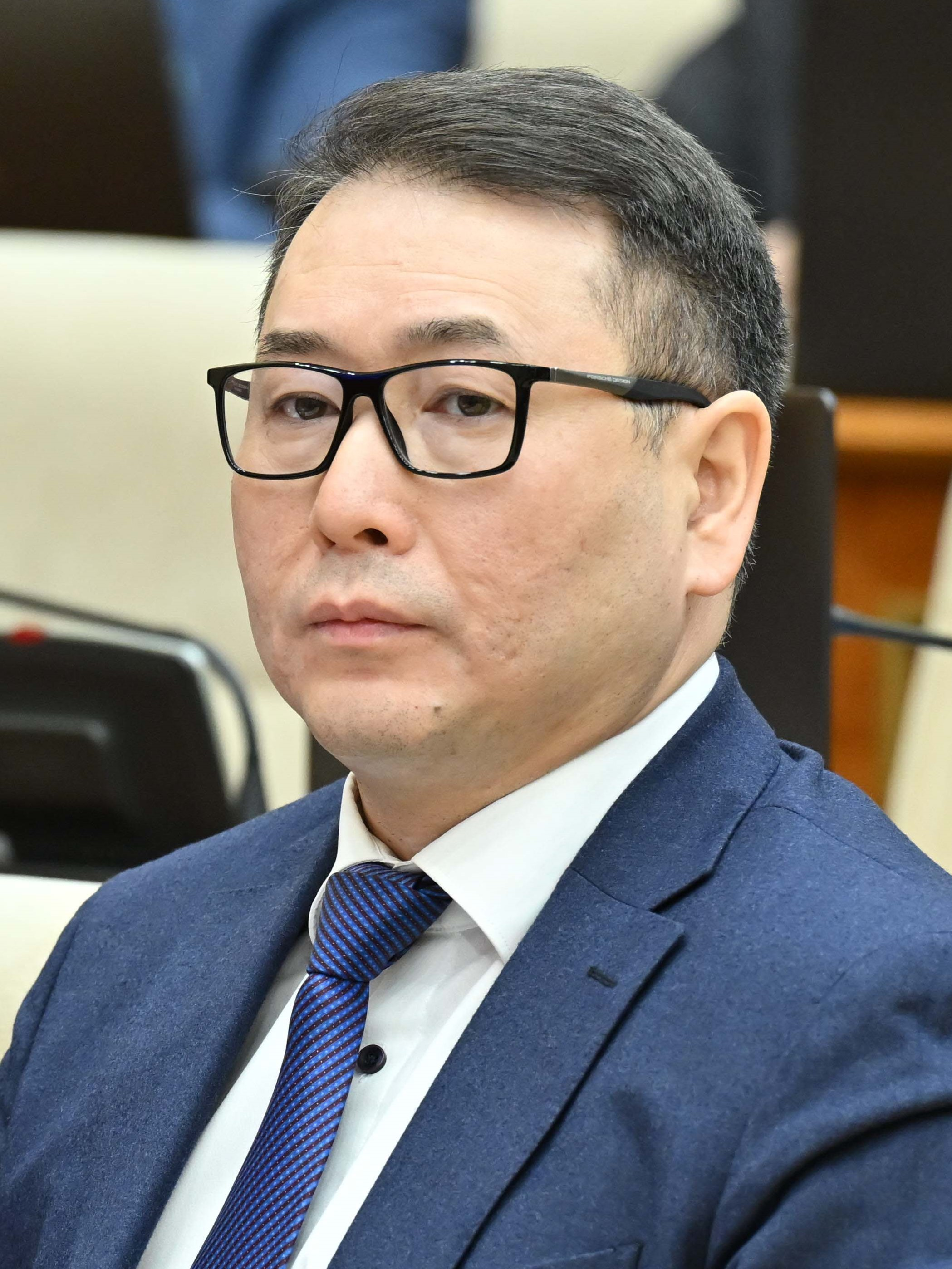
- Şaqqaliev in 2024

Minister of Industry and Construction
- Incumbent
- Assumed office 4 September 2023
- President: Kassym-Jomart Tokayev
- Prime Minister: Älihan Smaiylov; Roman Sklyar (acting); Oljas Bektenov
- Preceded by: Serik Jumanğarin

Personal details
- Born: 1 December 1977 (age 48) Balkhash, Kazakh SSR, Soviet Union (now Kazakhstan)
- Education: L. N. Gumilev Eurasian National University; Karagandy State University; M. Dulatov Kostanay Engineering and Economic University; Diplomatic Academy of the Ministry of Foreign Affairs of the Russian Federation
- Awards: Medal "20 Years of Independence of the Republic of Kazakhstan"; Order of Kurmet

Arman Abaiuly Şaqqaliev (Kazakh: Арман Абайұлы Шаққалиев, romanized: Arman Abaiūly Şaqqaliev; born 1 December 1977) is a Kazakh politician, lawyer, and economist who is serving as Minister of Trade and Integration of Kazakhstan since 2 September 2023. He previously served as minister in charge of Competition and Antitrust Regulation of the Eurasian Economic Commission from 2020 to 2023 and is a corresponding member of the International Academy of Engineering.

== Biography ==
=== Early life and education ===
Şaqqaliev was born on 1 December 1977 in the city of Balkhash, Karaganda Region. He graduated from the Gumilyov Eurasian National University in 1998with a degree in law, in 2004 from Buketov Karaganda State University with a degree in economics, from M. Dulatov Kostanay Engineering and Economic University in 2014 with a bachelor's degree in engineering and technology, and from the Diplomatic Academy of the Ministry of Foreign Affairs of Russia in 2019 with a master's degree in economics.

=== Career ===
From 1998 to 2001, Şaqqaliev worked as a legal adviser at the Agency for the Reorganization and Liquidation of Enterprises in Astana and Akmola Region. In 2001–2002, he served as chief specialist and later head of department at the Agency for State Material Reserves.

Between 2002 and 2004, he headed the Department for Analysis and Monitoring of Insolvent Enterprises of the Committee for Work with Insolvent Debtors of the Ministry of State Revenues. From 2004 to 2008, he was director of the Kazakhstan Institute of Metrology Consulting.

From 2008 to 2016, he was director of the Kazakhstan Institute for Standardization and Certification under the Committee for Technical Regulation and Metrology. He then served as director of the Department of Technical Regulation and Accreditation of the Eurasian Economic Commission from 2016 to 2018.

From 16 July 2018, Şaqqaliev was chairman of the Committee for Technical Regulation and Metrology of the Ministry of Investment and Development, and in 2019–2020, chairman of the same committee within the Ministry of Trade and Integration.

From 6 November 2020, he was a member of the Board of the Eurasian Economic Commission from Kazakhstan, serving as minister in charge of Competition and Antitrust Regulation. On 11 October 2022, he was appointed as First Vice Minister of Trade and Integration.

On 2 September 2023, Şaqqaliev was appointed Minister of Trade and Integration by President Kassym-Jomart Tokayev's decree. He was reappointed on 6 February 2024.

== Awards ==
- Order of Kurmet (2021)
- Medal "For Contribution to the Development of the Eurasian Economic Union" (2019)
- Medal "20 Years of Independence of the Republic of Kazakhstan" (2011)
