= Bereke Bank =

Bank in Kazakhstan

- Formerly: TexaKaBank (1993-2006); Sberbank Kazakhstan (2006-2022)
- Industry: Banking
- Founded: 1993
- Headquarters: Almaty, Kazakhstan
- Key people: Andrey Timchenko (Chairperson of the Management Board)
- Owner: Baiterek
- Website: berekebank.kz

Bereke Bank (KASE:BERK) is a Kazakh commercial bank. Its head office is located in Almaty, Kazakhstan.

== History ==
=== TexaKaBank ===
TexaKaBank was established on 19 March 1993 as a joint Kazakh-American bank. Its capital as of 1 October 2005 was 2.7 billion tenge ($20 million), assets — 23.3 billion tenge ($175 million), loan portfolio — 14.9 billion tenge ($112 million). Net profit for the first nine months of 2005 amounted to 783 million tenge ($5.9 million).

The main owners of TexaKaBank in 2005 were the head of the United Central Bank, Gregory Studer (81.5%), and the head of the Kazakh representative office of Finintex, Valery Gekko (5%). Finintex had previously carried out a deal for TexaKaBank to purchase the Russian Metrobank.

The bank had more than 20 branches in Almaty, Atyrau, and Uralsk, and since 2001, it had beben a part of the deposit insurance system of Kazakhstan.

At the end of July 2006, 80% of the share in the authorized capital of TexaKaBank was bought by Sberbank of Russia. According to media reports, the approximate amount of the transaction then amounted to $100 million. At the end of 2006, Sberbank increased its share in TexaKaBank from 80% to 99.99%. According to the results of 2006, TexaKaBank took 278th place among CIS banks and 15th place among Kazakh banks in terms of assets. As of January 2007, assets amounted to 27.3 billion tenge, liabilities — 22.9 billion tenge, equity — 4.4 billion tenge.

=== Sberbank Kazakhstan ===
In early 2007, the bank was renamed into the Subsidiary Bank Joint Stock Company Sberbank of Russia. In 2007, the credit institution received a license to conduct banking and other operations carried out by banks in national and foreign currencies. In the same year, the bank's authorized capital was increased by almost 15 times and amounted to 29 billion tenge (more than $240 million), which allowed it to enter the top 10 largest banks in Kazakhstan by authorized capital.

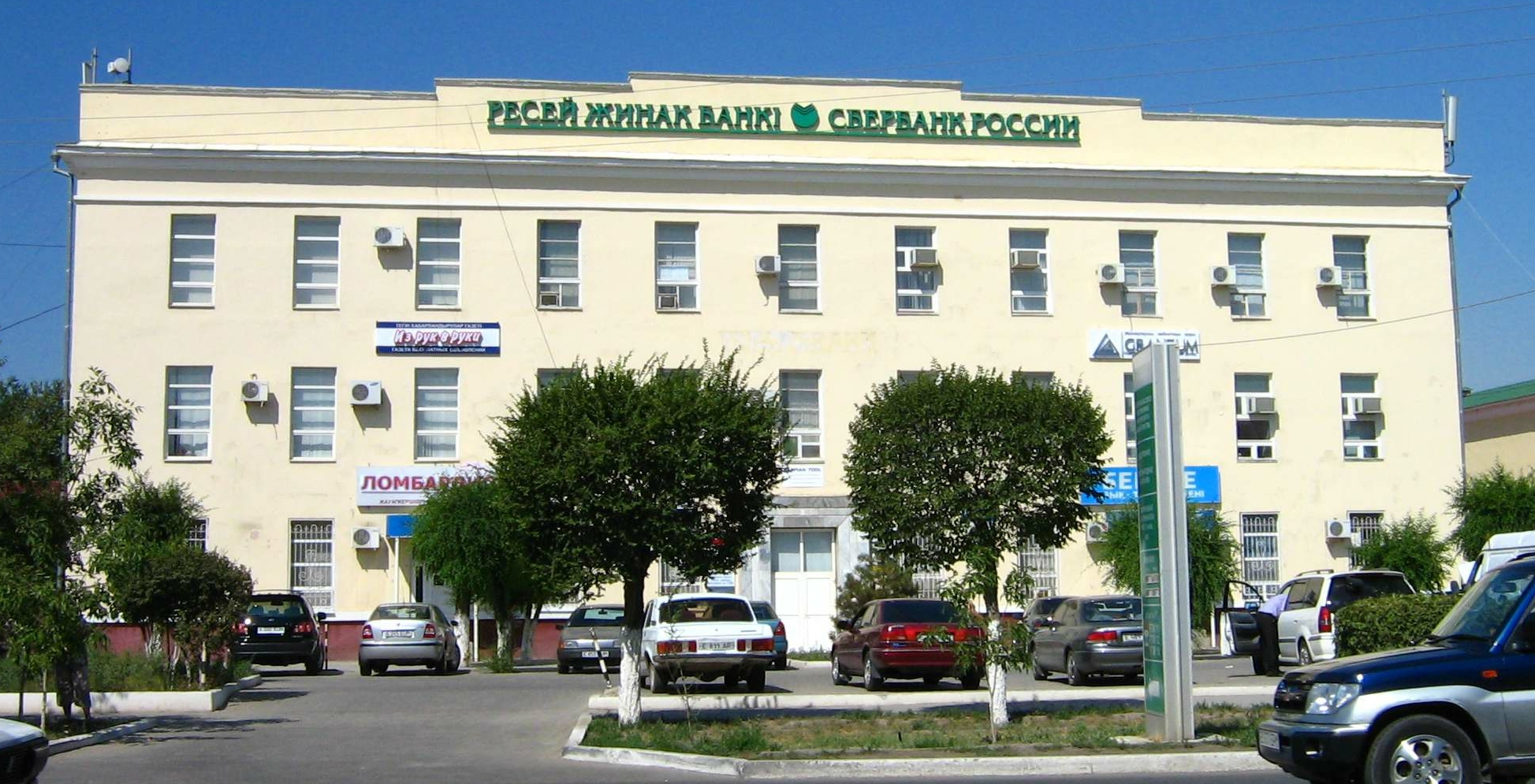
Sberbank branch in Atyrau

In 2009, by decision of the board of the Kazakhstan Stock Exchange (KASE), Sberbank of Russia was granted the status of a market maker of the Russian ruble (and since 2011, the US dollar; since 2014, the Chinese yuan). In 2010, the loan portfolio of SB Sberbank JSC exceeded 100 billion tenge. Two years later, the bank took sixth place in the banking system of Kazakhstan with a share of over 5%, and its capital was 15 billion tenge due to the placement of 2 million ordinary shares. At the beginning of 2020, SB Sberbank JSC already ranked 2nd in terms of assets among banks in Kazakhstan and had a branch network consisting of 101 structural divisions.

==== Sanctions and sale ====
In connection with the 2022 Russian invasion of Ukraine, the parent company Sberbank was subject to UK and US sanctions in April 2022, and to European Union sanctions in July. As a result, the assets of Sberbank and its subsidiaries were frozen, and any interaction between US individuals and legal entities was prohibited. In Kazakhstan, the Sber KZ application was removed from online stores for iOS and Android mobile phones, and the bank was disconnected from the SWIFT international interbank system.

In mid-April, Halyk Bank bought out part of the retail loan portfolio from SB Sberbank JSC under an assignment agreement. This deal affected car loans issued under the preferential lending program of the Development Bank of Kazakhstan, part of unsecured loans, loans for urgent needs, and mortgages. The total principal debt on the transferred loans amounted to 330 billion tenge (as of 1 April 2022, the loan portfolio of consumer loans of SB Sberbank JSC amounted to 1.1 trillion tenge).

At the same time, the Russian Sberbank began to look for a buyer for its Kazakh subsidiary, and the Office of Foreign Assets Control of the US Treasury Department issued a license setting a deadline for winding down operations with SB Sberbank JSC until 12 July 2022. The bank began to feel an outflow of customer funds. After falling under sanctions, clients of the Kazakh subsidiadry of Sberbank withdrew about 38% of their funds from it.

In May, the media reported that one of the main contenders for the asset was the Baiterek national holding, controlled by the government of the Republic of Kazakhstan, with which the European Bank for Reconstruction and Development (EBRD) may participate in the deal. In June, EBRD CEO Odile Renaud-Basso said that her bank could recapitalize SB Sberbank JSC when it changed hands. The following month, OFAC extended the license to complete transactions with SB Sberbank JSC for another three months, until 11 October 2022. On 23 August, it was announced an agreement had been signed to sell of all Sberbank's shares in SB Sberbank JSC to Baiterek.

On 1 September, Baiterek and Sberbank of Russia closed the deal to buy and sell Sberbank Kazakhstan. At the same time, plans were announced to rename the organization to Bereke Bank ("bereke" in Kazakh means abundance, prosperity). On 21 September, the bank completed re-registration and became known as Bereke Bank.

In February 2023, the US Treasury Department announced that it would lift sanctions on the bank on 6 March.

== Owners and management ==
From January 2020 - July 2022 - Chairman of the Board Tenizbaev Eldar.

On March 11, 2020, Timur Kozintsev was elected Chairman of the Board of Directors.

Since July 2022, Nursultan Taskaranov has been appointed Chairman of the Board of SB Sberbank JSC.

On November 17, 2022, Andrey Timchenko has been appointed Chairman of the Board of Bereke Bank.

Currently, Board consists of three people: Andrey Timchenko (Chairman), Serke Kassenov (First Deputy Chairman), Alina Anikina (Deputy Chairman).

== Indexes ==
In January 2022, the bank assets reached 4.221 trillion tenge. The organizational structure included 95 groups; 13 of them are branches.
