= Serik Jumanğarin =

Kazakh politician (born (1969)

- Серік Жұманғарин
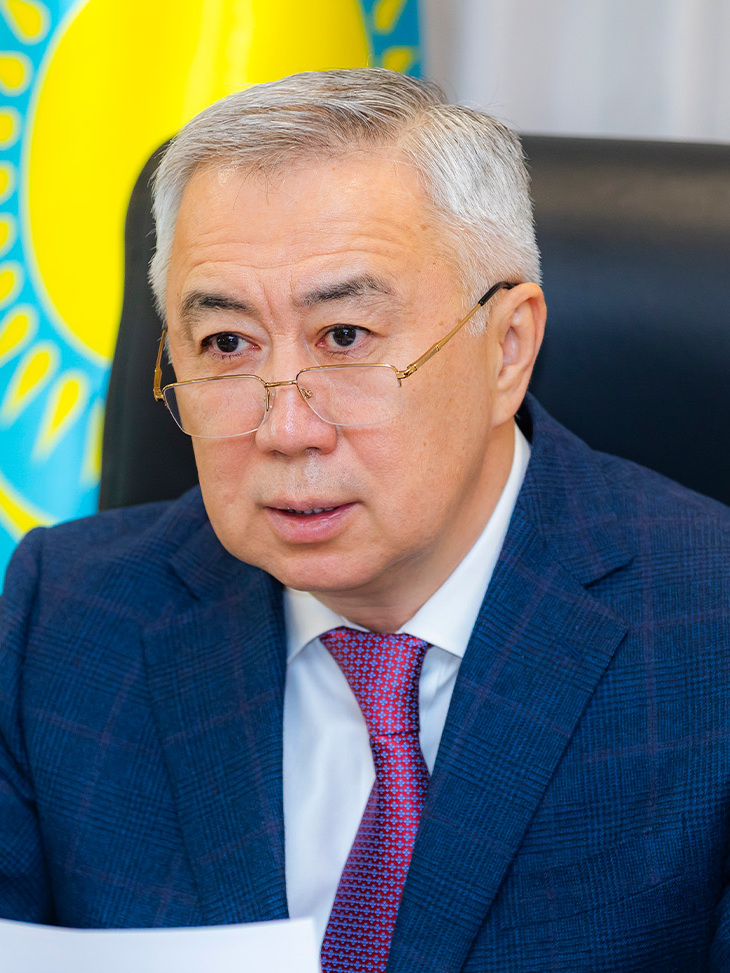
- Jumanğarin in 2026

Minister of National Economy of Kazakhstan
- Incumbent
- Assumed office 21 December 2024
- President: Kassym-Jomart Tokayev
- Prime Minister: Oljas Bektenov
- Preceded by: Nurlan Baibazarov

Deputy Prime Minister
- Incumbent
- Assumed office 2 September 2022
- President: Kassym-Jomart Tokayev
- Prime Minister: Älihan Smaiylov; Roman Sklyar (acting); Oljas Bektenov

Minister of Trade and Integration
- In office 2 September 2022 – 2 September 2023
- President: Kassym-Jomart Tokayev
- Prime Minister: Älihan Smaiylov
- Preceded by: Bakhyt Sultanov
- Succeeded by: Arman Şaqqaliev

Chairman of the Agency for the Protection and Development of Competition
- In office 14 September 2020 – 15 August 2022
- President: Kassym-Jomart Tokayev
- Preceded by: Rustam Ahmetov
- Succeeded by: Marat Omarov

Minister of Competition and Antimonopoly Regulation of the EEC
- In office 20 December 2019 – 14 September 2020
- Preceded by: Marat Qusaiynov
- Succeeded by: Arman Şaqqaliev

Personal details
- Born: 22 July 1969 (age 57) Aktobe, Aktobe Region, Kazakh SSR, Soviet Union
- Children: 3
- Education: Moscow Power Engineering Institute (1993); Karagandy State University (1997); Almaty Management University (2013)
- Occupation: thermal physicist (1993); economist (1997); Master of Business administration (2013)

Serık Maqaşūly Jumanğarin (Note: Often transliterated as Serik Makashevich Zhumangarin through a Russified Romanization of Серик Макашевич Жумангарин.) (Note: Kazakh: Серік Мақашұлы Жұманғарин, [sʲeˈrɘk mɑˈqɑʂo̙ɫɯ ʐo̙mɑnˈɣɑrɯjn]) (born 22 July 1969) is a Kazakh politician, economist, and physicist, who's currently serving as the deputy prime minister since 2022 and minister of national economy since 2024.

== Early life and education ==
Serik Jumanğarin was born July 22, 1969, in the city of Aktobe.

Jumanğarin finished his studies as a thermal physicist in the Moscow Power Engineering Institute in 1993. Jumanğarin later studied in the Karagandy State University, ended it in 1997 and became an economist. In 2013, he finished attending the Almaty Management University with the master's degree in business administration.

== Career ==
Jumanğarin gives a speech in 2013

Jumanğarin started his career in business. In the years of 1993–2004, he served in many different minor business-related positions.

In 2005, he started his political career as the deputy head of the economy and budget planning department of the city of Aktobe, which he held until 2006. From April to December of the same year, he served as the head of the business department of Aktobe.

From 2006 to 2007, he was the deputy head of the Aktobe Region Department of the Agency for the Regulation of Natural Monopolies of Kazakhstan, and in 2007–2008 he was the head of that agency. From March to June of the latter year, he also headed one of the departments in the agency.

In June 2008, Jumanğarin held the position of Deputy Chairman of the Trade Committee, Director of the Trade Development Department of the Ministry of Industry and Trade, and held these positions until April 2010. After that, until July of the same year, he was the deputy chairman of the board of "Kazakhstan Contract Agency" JSC.

From July 2010 to November 2011, Jumanğarin was the deputy chairman and first deputy of the board of JSC "NadLoc National Agency for the Development of Local Coverage", and from March to July 2012 he served as the director of the Department of Regional Policy and Interbudgetary Relations of the Ministry of Economic Development and Trade.

From July 25, 2012, to January of the following year, Jumanğarin headed the Regional Development Committee of the Ministry of Economic Development and Trade, and from February 2013 to August 15, 2014, he was the Vice Minister of Regional Development.

In the years of 2014–2017, he was the chairman of the Committee for Regulation of Natural Monopolies and Protection of Competition of the Ministry of National Economy, and in 2017–2019, he was the Vice Minister of the same ministry.

On December 20, 2019, he was appointed Minister of Competition and Antimonopoly Regulation at the Eurasian Economic Commission, a position he held until August 14, 2020. On September 14, 2020, he headed the Agency for Protection and Development of Competition of Kazakhstan.

In August 2022, he was appointed Deputy Prime Minister — Acting Minister of Trade and Integration by presidential decree, and was relieved of the post of chairman of the agency. In September of the same year, he was appointed a full-fledged deputy prime minister and minister, and was reappointed on April 3 of the following year.

On September 2, 2023, he was dismissed from the post of minister, though continued to be the Deputy Prime Minister. On 21 December 2024, Jumanğarin was appointed as the Minister of National Economy, but continued his tenure as Deputy Prime Minister, this came after the unexplained resignation of Nurlan Baibazarov from both positions.

Jumanğarin is a member of the Board of the Eurasian Economic Commission from Kazakhstan since 2019 and a representative of Kazakhstan in the EEC Council since 2022, a member of the Board of Directors of JSC "Khorgas" International Center for Border Cooperation, Member of the Board of Directors of the companies "QazTrade" JSC, "Center for Trade Policy Development" and the "QazExpoCongress" National Company.

== Criticism and controversies ==
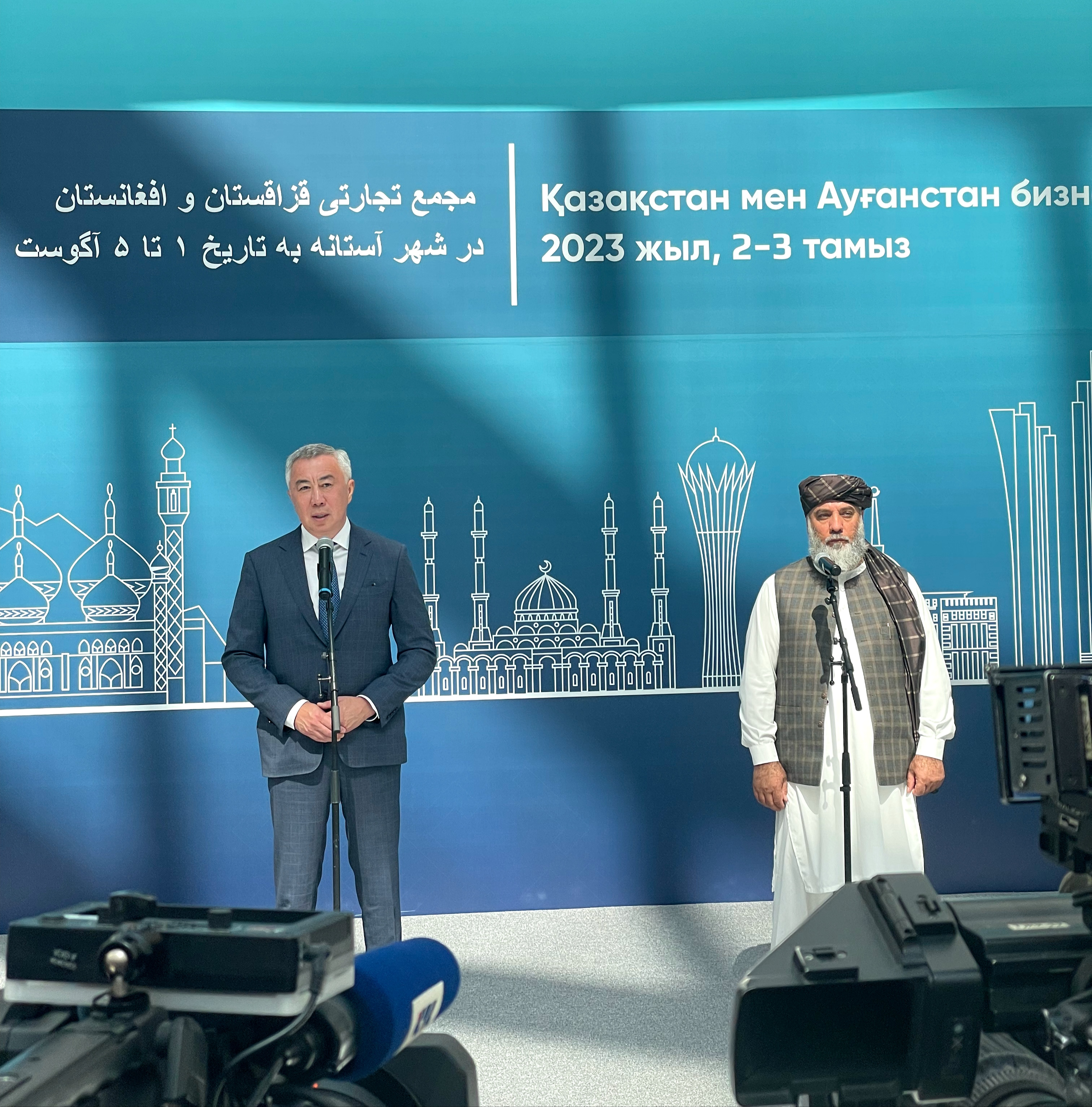
Serik Jumanğarin (left) and Taliban member, Minister of Commerce and Industry Nooruddin Azizi, 3 August 2023

=== Cursing out a journalist ===
In 2019, Jumanğarin, who was Vice Minister at that time, was filmed telling reporters not to "get on his nerves". He was criticized for this, and a few days later admitted that he "went too far with his manner of speech" and apologized.

=== Allegations of corruption ===
In 2016, the "Bäse" YouTube channel headed by Aidos Sadykov accused Jumanğarin, who was the head of the Committee for Regulation of Natural Monopolies and Protection of Competition at the Ministry of National Economy at the time, of taking 10 apartments as a bribe and registering nine of them as the property of his wife. On February 22, 2023, Jumanğarin denied the allegations, calling them "slander", saying that he purchased the apartments on his own merits and did not do anything illegal.

=== Afghan–Kazakh business forum ===
Despite including the Taliban in the list of terrorist organizations and not officially recognizing their government, Kazakhstan and its Ministry of Trade and Integration held an Afghan-Kazakh business forum in Astana on August 3, 2023. 200 Afghan delegates came to the forum, and during it, contracts worth about 200 million dollars were signed. Among the participants of the forum were Serik Jumanğarin himself and Minister of Commerce and Industry of Afghanistan Nooruddin Azizi.

=== Locust comment ===
When addressing the locust problem that Kazakh agrarians and farmers were facing, Serik Jumanğarin went on to note that the parasite could be consumed and was considered halal to eat. This comment sparked great controversy, as no insect has ever been part of Kazakh cuisine and the comment was taken as Jumanğarin not taking the parasite issue seriously. The words were also criticised by MP Erlan Sairov, with Sairov noting that, for farmers, locusts are no food, but parasites.

When asked about the controversial comment, Jumanğarin replied, that it was said so that "[the mass media] could have some fun" in the "quite intense social and political life" of the country, also claiming that he never intended to actually propose that the populace eat locusts. He also promised that Kazakhstan would see no locust problem in 2024.

== Awards, decorations and titles ==
Jumangarin's awards include:

- Medal "10 years of Astana";
- Medal "For Contribution to the Creation of the Eurasian Economic Union".
