= United Chemical Company =

- Native name: Біріккен химиялық компания Birikken hımııalyq kompanııa
- Type: State-owned enterprise
- Industry: Chemical industry
- Founded: 2009; 17 years ago
- Headquarters: Kazakhstan, Nur-Sultan, Dinmukhamed Kunayev str. 8, block B, 34-floor
- Key people: Askhat Omarov (chairman)
- Parent: Samruk-Kazyna

The United Chemical Company (Kazakh: Біріккен химиялық компания, Birikken hımııalyq kompanııa; Russian: Объединенная химическая компания) - the state-owned company in Kazakhstan established in 2009 by the decision of the Board of Directors of the "National Welfare Fund "Samruk-Kazyna" JSC as of November 28, 2008; the main operator of the State Program on Accelerated Industrial and Innovative Development for the chemical industry. Currently, the United Chemical Company implements a number of investment projects, which include the productions existing and being modernized, as well as the ventures newly established in the Kazakhstan’s chemical industry. Their products are intended for various industries, including the gold mining industry, agriculture, etc.

As part of the company’s mission, the measures have been taken to modernize the existing Kazakhstani chemical enterprises and to organize the production of more than 20 new types of chemical products; the development of competitive projects in the chemical industry aimed at the manufacturing of high-tech, export-oriented and innovative products with high added value; establishing of projects to make products which have not previously been produced in Kazakhstan - sodium cyanide, potassium sulfate, polypropylene and propylene oxide, glyphosate, calcium chloride, polyethylene, polyvinyl chloride, superplasticizers for concrete, additives to oils, flotation reagents, and other products.

== Background ==
On October 13, 2008, speaking at an enlarged meeting of the Government of Kazakhstan, President of the country Nursultan Nazarbayev instructed to "create a special company that will deal with projects in the chemical industry". The Fund "Samruk-Kazyna", pursuant to the order of the president, established the United Chemical Company (UCC), which became the leading state-owned operator in the chemical industry.

The goals, to which the UCC has been assigned to, included the concentration of state assets in the industry and promoting its further development. The priority projects include, among others, the reconstruction of the sulfuric acid plant with a capacity of 180 thousand tons per year, the construction of an integrated gas chemical complex, the production of polymer products in the Atyrau oblast, the construction of the SEZ "Chemical Park "Taraz", and others.

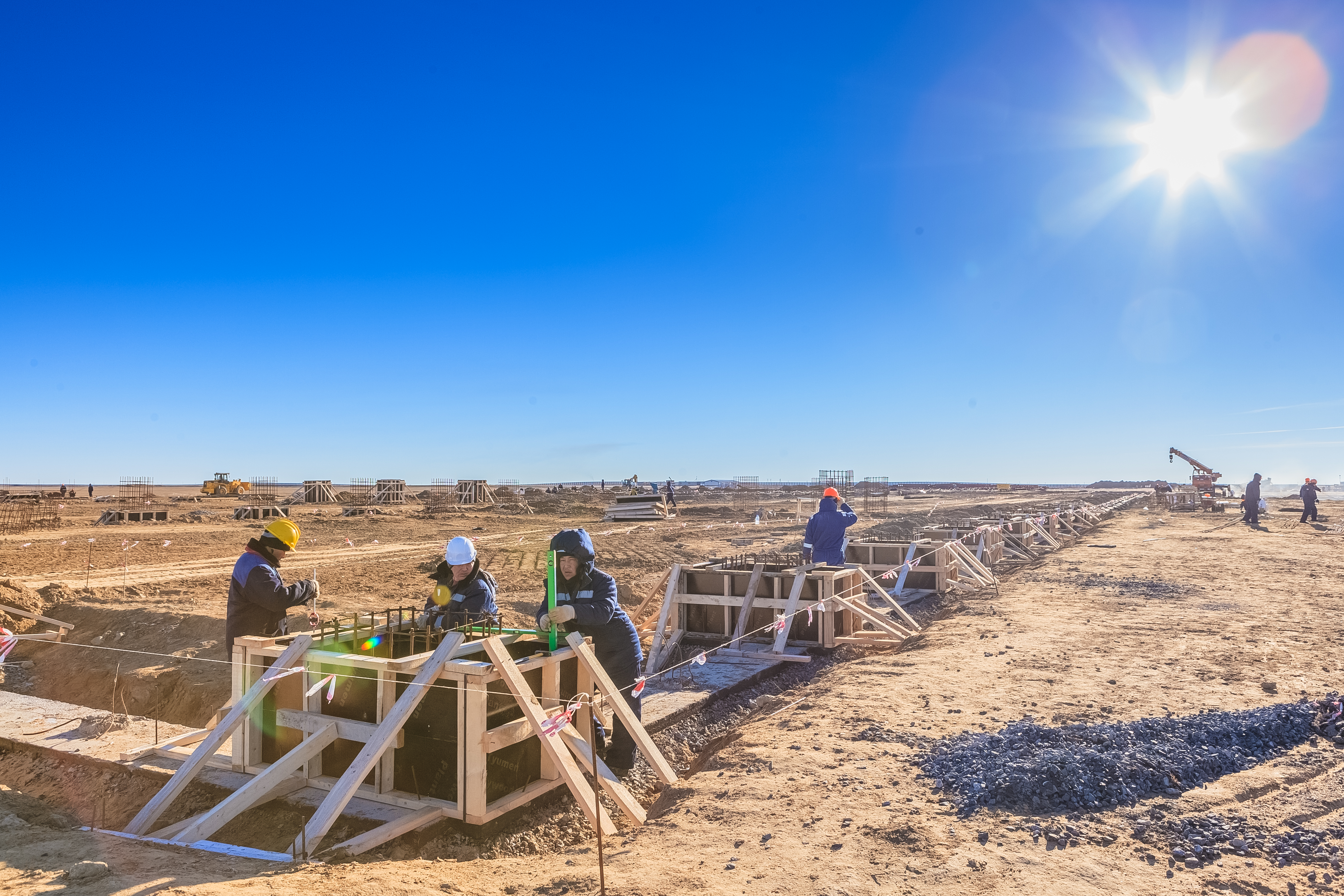
Construction of the complex on the production of polymer products in the Atyrau oblast

In February 2011, the "Development Bank of Kazakhstan" JSC and the "Eximbank" of China signed a loan agreement to finance the first phase of construction of the integrated gas chemical complex in the Atyrau oblast. In 2011, the construction of the gas chemical complex for the production of polymer products has been started. As part of the first phase of the project (polypropylene), a loan agreement has been signed to finance the first phase of the project, designing of infrastructure facilities has been completed, construction works on infrastructure facilities have continued, the work has begun on designing the main process units and on-site utilities, the design and estimate documentation has been developed. In August 2011, during an official meeting of the President of the Republic of Kazakhstan Nursultan Nazarbayev with the President of the Republic of Korea Lee Myung-bak, with the purpose of the joint implementation of the second phase of the project, the Kazakh and Korean parties have signed an agreement on the joint venture «KLPE» LLP. Under the second phase of the project (polyethylene), a strategic partner («LG Chem Ltd.»), who joined the list of participants of the project company in the second phase of the project, has been selected, and the feasibility study has been updated.

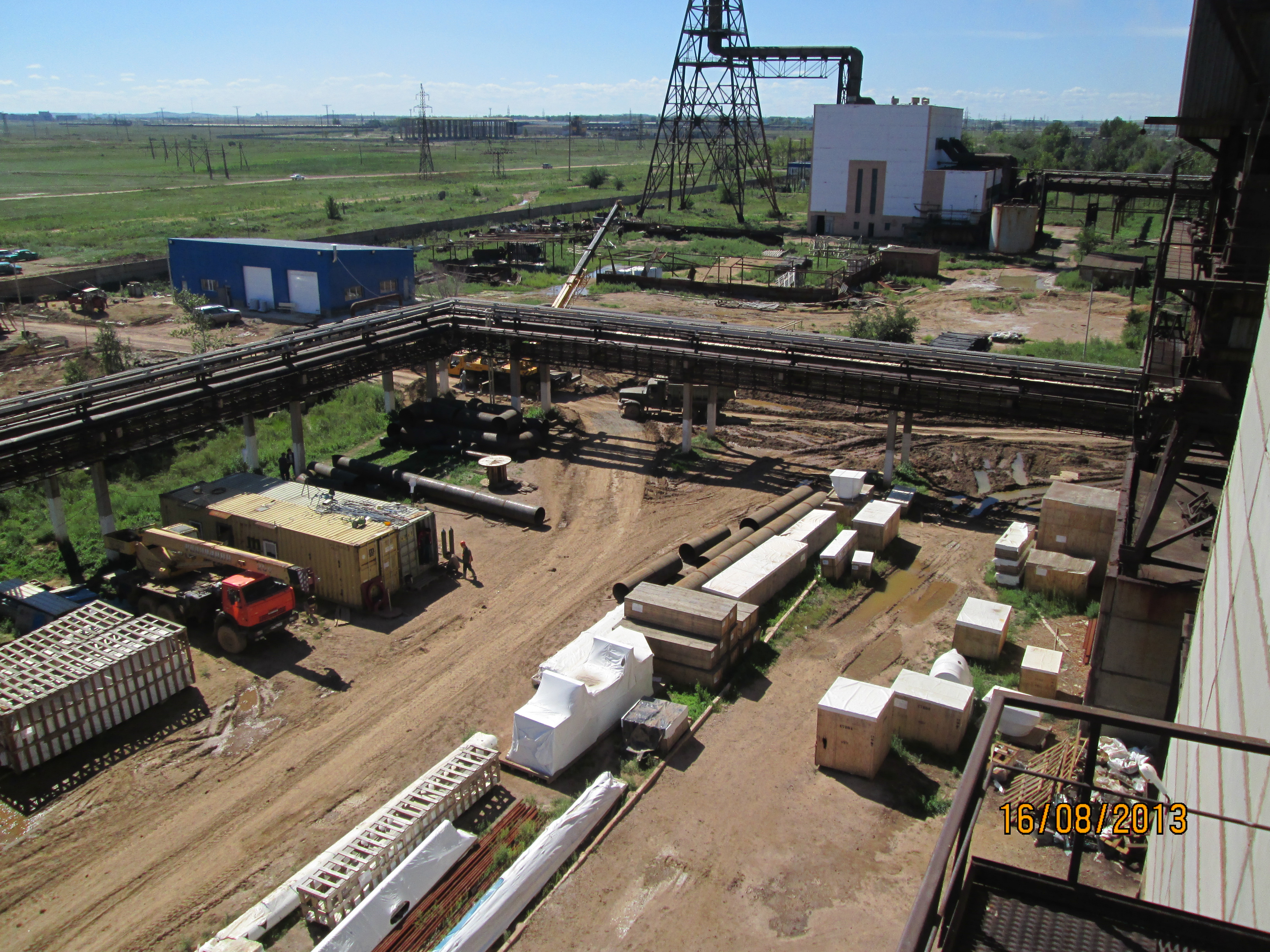
Reconstruction of the sulfuric acid plant in Stepnogorsk

In 2011, the "JV SAP Kazatomprom" LLP and the Eurasian Development Bank signed a loan agreement for the financing of the project on the reconstruction of the sulfuric acid plant with the production capacity of 180 thousand tons per year in the Akmola oblast (Stepnogorsk). On September 30, 2011, the General Assembly of the European Chemical Industry Council (CEFIC) approved the application of the "United Chemical Company" LLP for obtaining the status of a CEFIC associate company.

In 2012, the work has been continued on the projects:

- in March, a memorandum of understanding in respect of financing the project "Construction of an integrated gas chemical complex in the Atyrau oblast – Phase 2 (polyethylene)" was signed with the Korean export credit agencies («K-SURE» and «K-EXIM»);
- in March, the UCC joined the list of participants of the «KLPE» LLP (hereinafter - «KLPE» LLP) - the operator of the project "Construction of an integrated gas chemical complex in the Atyrau oblast – Phase 2 (polyethylene)";
- in April, the UCC acquired from the "KazMunaiGas" 51% of the participation share in the «KPI Inc.» LLP (since October 2009 – under the trust management of the company);
- in May, a cooperation agreement on the management of chemical industrial parks in Kazakhstan was signed between the UCC and the company «Jurong International Holding Pte» (Singapore);
- in May, the Memorandum on scientific and technological cooperation and training of specialists for the chemical industry was signed with the Kazakh National University named after Al-Farabi.
- in July, a specialized engineering company under the name of the "UCC Engineering" LLP has been established;
- in September, the UCC has joined the list of participants of the "Polymer Production" LLP - the project operator for the production of polymer products in the Atyrau oblast;
- in November, the Free economic zone “Chemical park Taraz” has been established by the decree of the President of the Republic of Kazakhstan Nursultan Nazarbayev;
- in December, the "HIM-plus" LLP has been created as the operator of projects for the production of phosphorus trichloride, caustic soda, chlorine and glyphosate.

In 2013, the main activity of the company has been investment operations under which the UCC has managed the following projects:

- The reconstruction of the sulfuric acid plant with a capacity of 180 thousand tons per year in the Akmola oblast. As part of the reconstruction process, construction and installation works were conducted, the basic technological equipment has been supplied by Desmet Ballestra, and the problem of vapor recovery – the power complex installation has been resolved
- The construction of an integrated gas chemical complex in the Atyrau oblast, the first phase (polypropylene): an access car road has been finished; the works on the transformer station foundation have been completed, portals have been erected; and the leveling operation has been completed.
- The construction of an integrated gas chemical complex in the Atyrau oblast, the second phase (polyethylene). The work is currently being conducted to acquire debt financing through the funds of Korean and European export credit agencies.
- The production of polymer products in the Atyrau oblast. The findings of the state examination on the DED has been obtained; the mobilization of the contractor has been carried out; a field camp has been arranged; construction have been carried out and earthworks have been completed; reinforced concrete pile-driving was finished; the san-gravel mixture has been installed; madacamization and concrete blinding have been completed; construction materials have been imported.
- The production of glyphosate, phosphorus trichloride, caustic soda and chlorine: a legal consultant has been defined, a contract for consulting services on the project management at the Stage 0 has been signed with the "UCC Engineering" LLP; positive findings of the RSE "Gosexpertiza" have been obtained in respect of the feasibility reports for the projects "Production of caustic soda and chlorine", "Manufacture of phosphorus trichloride" and "Production of glyphosate"; the preparation works under the DED have been started, negotiating with suppliers and a licensor of the production technology is in progress.
- The provision of engineering services: licenses for designing of chemical productions, the implementation of project activities of category III, for designing of petrochemical productions, the execution of works and services in the field of environmental protection have been obtained.

In 2013, the "Management Company of SEZ “Chemical Park Taraz” has been established by the decision of the Board of the "Samruk-Kazyna" JSC within the implementation of the project "Establishment of the special economic zone Chemical Park Taraz". Goals of the SEZ establishment have included the creation of favorable conditions for attracting foreign direct investments in import-substituting and export-oriented, high-tech and competitive chemical productions. In addition, the goals of the project include the development and support of the chemical industry, in particular, the production of chemical products with high added value using modern, environmentally sound technologies by bringing the world’s leading companies.

== Leadership ==
Members of the Supervisory Council of the United Chemical Company include:

- Yerdebay Dauren Imanzhanuly – Deputy Chairman of the Board of the "Samruk-Kazyna" JSC, Chairman of the Supervisory council of the "United Chemical Company" LLP;
- Salimgereyev Malik Zhanabaevich – Managing Director of the "Samruk-Kazyna" JSC, member of the Supervisory council of the "United Chemical Company" LLP;
- Pirogov Alexei Georgievich – Director of the management of industrial assets of the "Samruk-Kazyna" JSC, member of the Supervisory council of the "United Chemical Company" LLP;
- Mynsharipova Saya Naymanbayқyzy – Director of the Audit and Control department of the "Samruk-Kazyna" JSC, member of the Supervisory council of the "United Chemical Company" LLP.

Members of the Board of the Partnership include:

- Omarov Askhat Asanovich – Chairman of the Board of the "United Chemical Company" LLP;
- Krylova Tatyana Nikolayevna – Deputy Chairman of the Board of "United Chemical Company" LLP;
- Oserbay Zhenis Alibekuly – Deputy Chairman of the Board of the "United Chemical Company" LLP;
- Amankabzhan Almat Amanovich – Managing Director-member of the Board of the "United Chemical Company" LLP;

== Subsidiary and affiliate companies ==
- "Management Company of the special economic zone Chemical Park Taraz" JSC has been established in accordance with the Decree of the President in November 2012. Goals for the SEZ establishment have included the creation of favorable conditions for attracting foreign direct investment in import-substituting and export-oriented, high-tech and competitive chemical productions. In addition, the goals of the project have been the development and support of the chemical industry, in particular, the production of chemical products with high added value using modern, environmentally sound technologies by bringing the world’s leading companies.
- “Kazakhstan Petrochemical Industries Inc.” LLP is the operator of the project "Construction of the first integrated gas chemical complex in the Atyrau oblast" (hereinafter - the Project) created on the basis of the resolution of the Government of the Republic of Kazakhstan №101 as of January 29, 2004.
- «KAZGOLD Reagents» LLP has been established in October 2013 with the aim of organizing the production of 25 thousand tons of sodium cyanide per year, which is mainly used by gold mining companies for the enrichment of gold ores.
- «KLPE» LLP. Under the Program on Accelerated Industrial and Innovative Development of the Republic of Kazakhstan for 2010-2014, the project "Construction of the integrated gas chemical complex in the Atyrau oblast - Second phase (polyethylene)" is being implemented. It is a part of the Program of the development of the petrochemical industry of the Republic of Kazakhstan for 2008-2013, and is carried out in order to use the available gas volumes of the Tengiz field as feedstock for the production of petrochemical products with high added value, for the subsequent sales in the domestic and foreign markets.
- "UCC Engineering" LLP has been established on August 3, 2012 in the framework of the State program of Accelerated Industrial and Innovative development of the Republic of Kazakhstan. The "UCC Engineering" LLP is a subsidiary of the "United Chemical Company" LLP and is a part of the group of companies of the "National Welfare Fund "Samruk-Kazyna" JSC", it is a specialized engineering company. The company provides expert and consulting services on the project management. The wide range of services of the company also includes: technical audit, examination of industrial safety, feasibility studies, marketing, financial and economic analysis. The company primarily operates in the priority sectors of the economy of Kazakhstan: chemistry and petrochemical industry, oil and gas, energy.
- "Polymer Production" LLP is a part of the group of companies of the "National Welfare Fund "Samruk-Kazyna" JSC," being a subsidiary of the "United Chemical Company" LLP. Currently, the "Polymer Production" LLP is implementing the investment project "Production of polymer products in the Atyrau oblast".
- "Sulfuric acid plant Kazatomprom" LLP. The main goals of the project: providing uranium mining enterprises of the NAC “Kazatomprom” with sulfuric acid; resolution of problems of sulfur processing having a negative impact on the environmental situation in the Caspian region; development of the chemical industry in the northern regions of the Republic of Kazakhstan by sulfur processing using modern technologies.
- "HIM-plus" LLP has been established on December 7, 2012 in the city of Astana at a general meeting of the founders of the "United Chemical Company" LLP and the "Samruk-Kazyna Invest" LLP. The goal of the "HIM-plus" LLP is the realization of investment projects "Production of glyphosate (herbicide)", "Production of caustic soda and chlorine", and "Production of phosphorus trichloride".
UCC projects

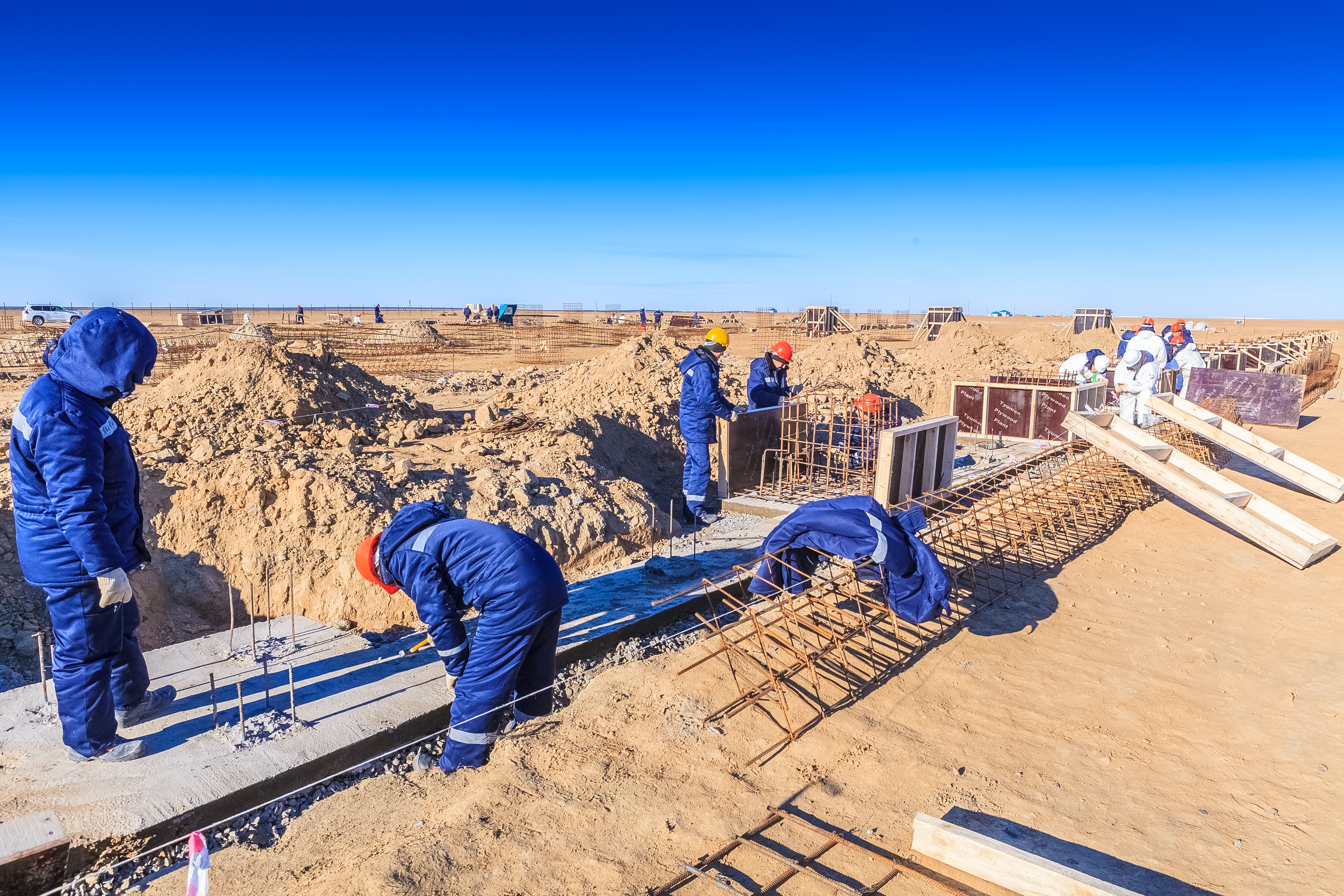
Construction of the complex on the production of polymer products in the Atyrau oblast

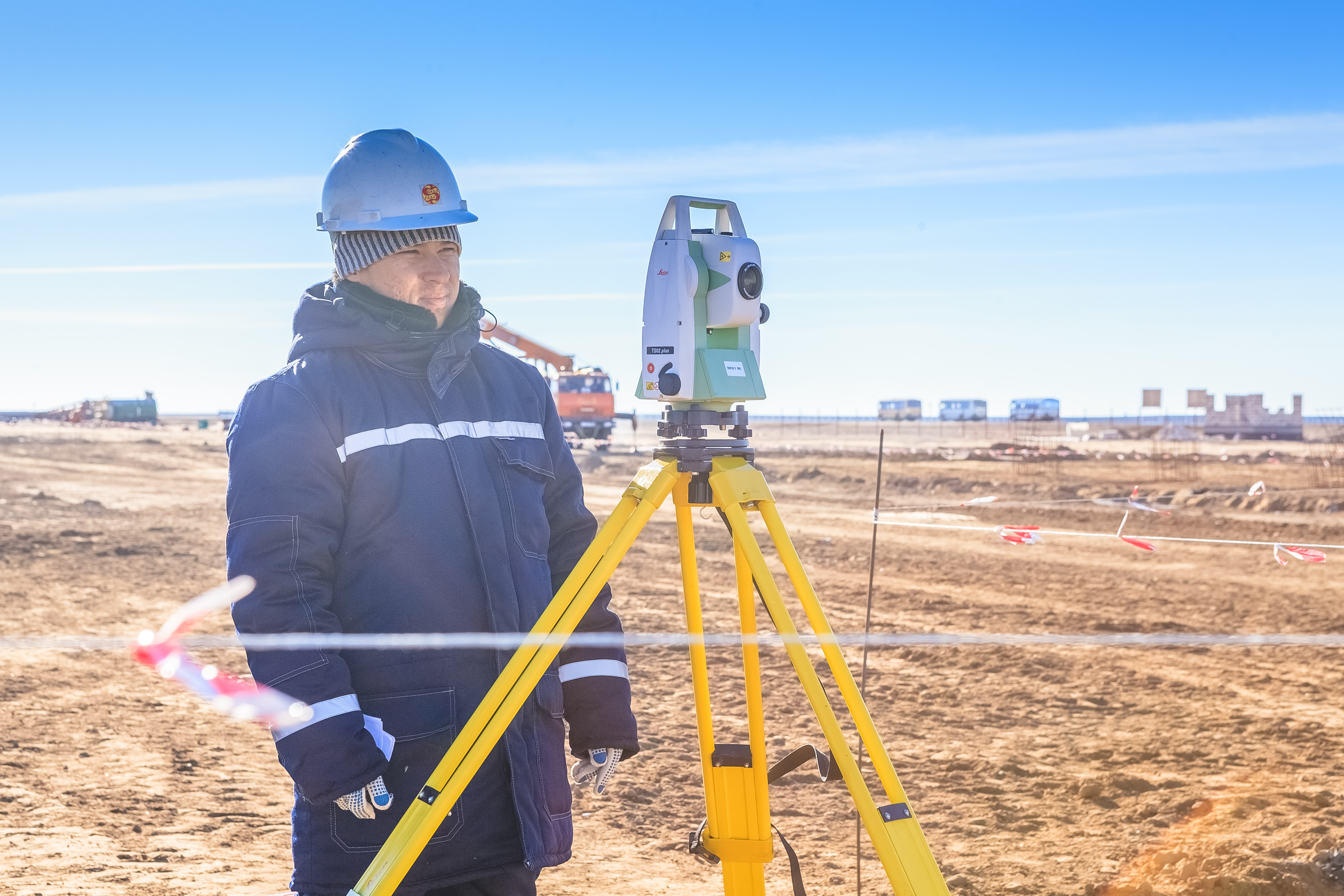
Construction of the complex on the production of polymer products in the Atyrau oblast

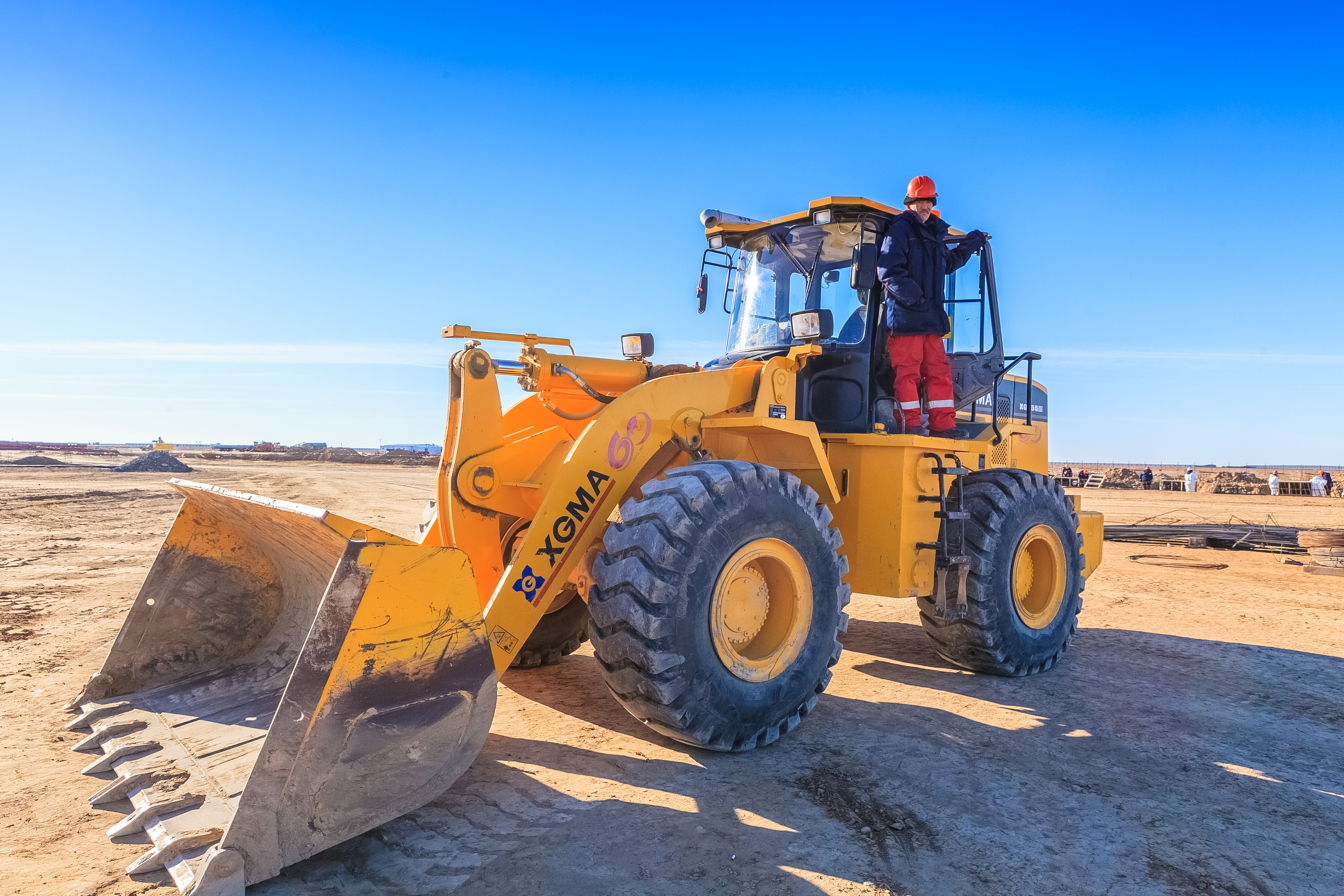
Construction of the complex on the production of polymer products in the Atyrau oblast

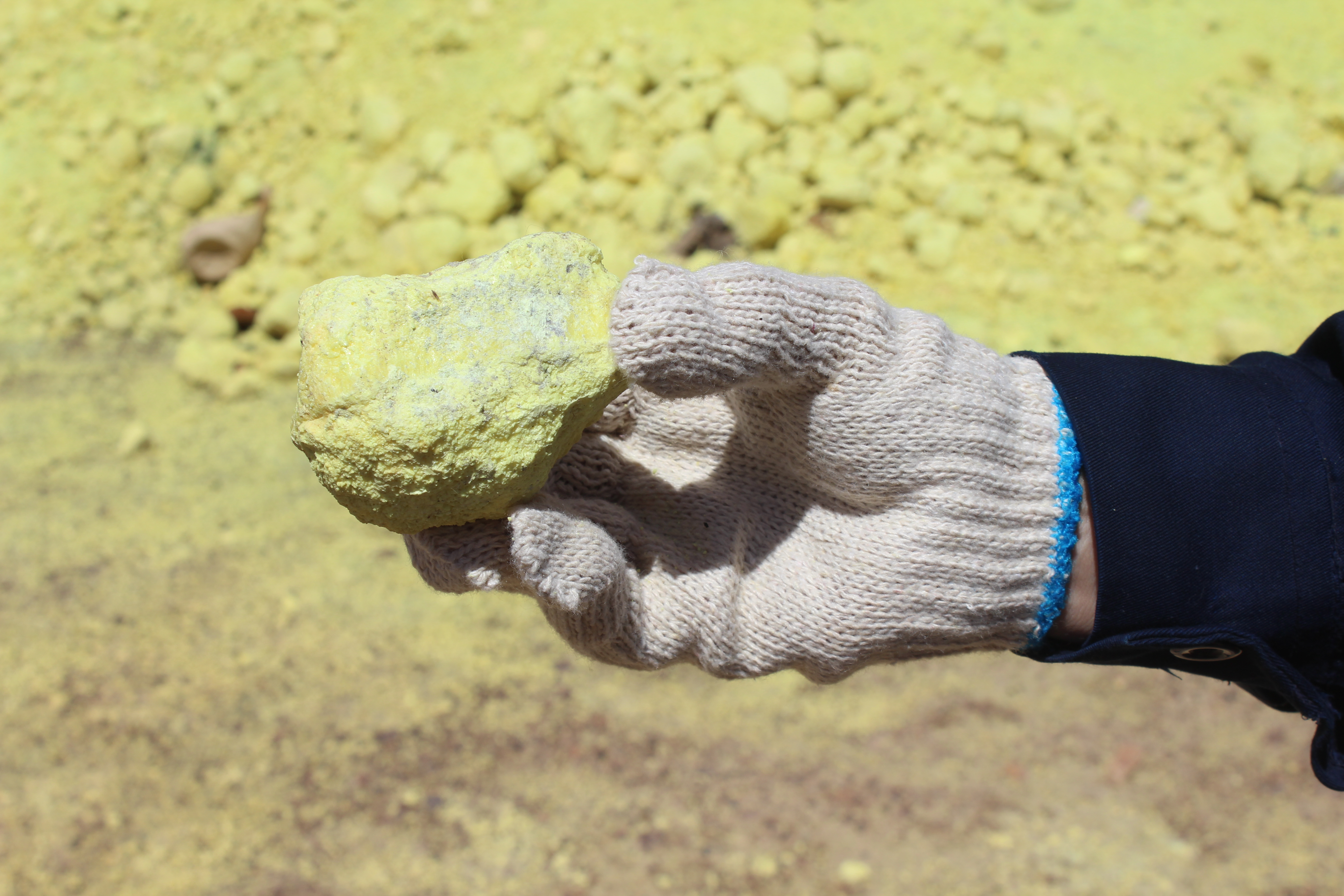
Reconstruction of the sulfuric acid plant in Stepnogorsk

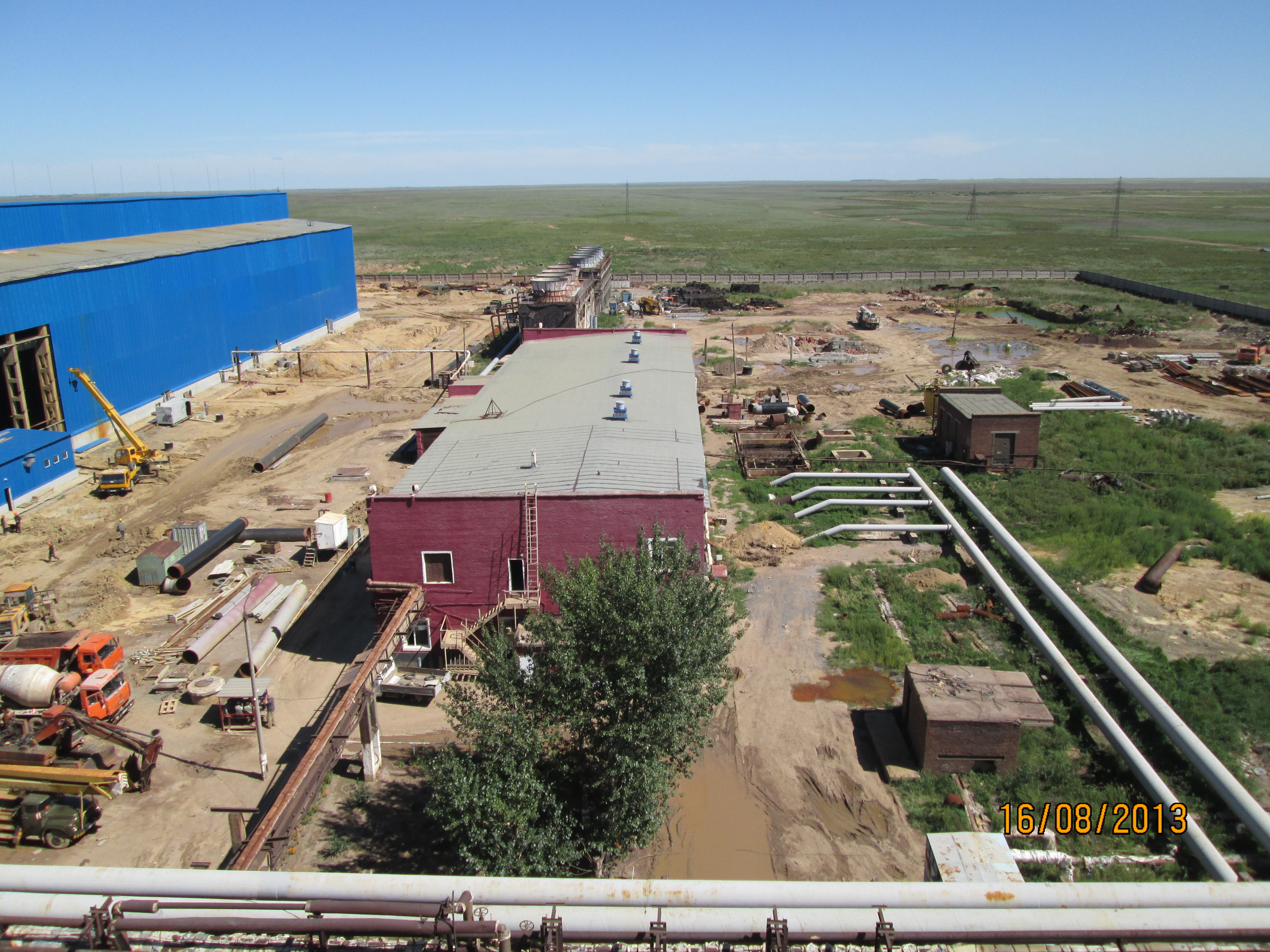
Reconstruction of the sulfuric acid plant in Stepnogorsk
