= Baiterek Holding =

Baiterek National Investment Holding JSC
- Native name: «Бәйтерек» ұлттық инвестициялық холдингі
- Type: State-owned enterprise
- Traded as: BTRK (KASE):
- Industry: Development, Finance
- Founded: 2013
- Headquarters: Astana, Kazakhstan
- Key people: Rustam Karagoishin (Chairman of the Management Board)
- Total assets: ▲KZT 20.9 trillion (US$46.3 billion) (2026 2Q)
- Total equity: ▲KZT 3.9 trillion (US$8.6 billion) (2026 2Q)
- Owner: Government of Kazakhstan
- Rating: BBB (Fitch)
- Website: baiterek.gov.kz/en/

Baiterek National Investment Holding (Note: Kazakh: «Бәйтерек» ұлттық инвестициялық холдингі; "Bäiterek" ūlttyq investitsiialyq holdingı; Russian: национальный инвестиционный холдинг «Байтерек»; natsionalny investitsionny kholding "Baiterek") is a state-owned financial and development institution in Kazakhstan. It was created to support economic modernization and diversification, entrepreneurship, and industrial development in the country. It is tasked with attracting investment and foster cluster development initiatives. The holding manages several national development institutions and financial organizations.

== History ==
Joint Stock Company "National Managing Holding Baiterek" was established in accordance with the Decree of the President of the Republic of Kazakhstan Nursultan Nazarbayev dated 22 May 2013 No. 571 "On certain measures to optimize the management system of development institutions, financial organizations, and the development of the national economy" and the Resolution of the Government of the Republic of Kazakhstan dated 25 May 2013 No. 516 "On measures to implement the Decree of the President of the Republic of Kazakhstan dated 22 May 2013 No. 571 'On certain measures to optimize the management system of development institutions, financial organizations, and the development of the national economy'".

The sole shareholder of Baiterek Holding is the Government of the Republic of Kazakhstan.

Baiterek's total consolidated assets grew from 5.6% to 12% of Kazakhstan's GDP from 2013 to 2021.

In January 2026 the company was renamed from Baiterek National Management Holding JSC to Baiterek National Investment Holding JSC.

== Structure ==
The holding includes multiple subsidiaries operating in development banking, venture capital, housing construction, export support, and credit guarantees. Its organizational structure is designed to provide financial and non-financial support across key sectors of the economy.

Subsidiaries:

- Development Bank of Kazakhstan
  - Industrial Development Fund
- Damu Entrepreneurship Development Fund
- KazakhExport
- Otbasy Bank
- Kazakhstan Housing Company
- Agrarian Credit Corporation
  - KazAgroFinance
- Qazaqstan Investment Corporation
  - Baiterek Venture Funds
  - Baiterek Venture Management

== Activities ==
The main activities of Baiterek Holding include:

- supporting entrepreneurship through loans, guarantees, and subsidies
- financing housing construction and mortgage development
- developing export potential of Kazakhstani companies
- supporting industrial, innovative, and high-tech sectors
- supporting agricultural and food sectors
- administering state financial development programs

=== Infrastructure Development ===
Infrastructure development is a key area of Baiterek's activities. Beginning in 2014, the Holding took on a more prominent role in advancing national infrastructure projects, primarily through the Development Bank of Kazakhstan (DBK). DBK's core mandate is to support the sustainable growth of the national economy by financing the non-resource sector. In that same year, DBK was appointed as the operator of Nurly Zhol, a government-funded state program aimed at developing infrastructure.

=== Housing and Mortgage Lending ===
Baiterek is a central institution in the development of Kazakhstan's housing market. Its involvement began with the Regional Development Program and the Housing Construction Guarantee Fund. In 2017, Baiterek was designated as the sole operator of Nurly Zher, a major state housing program designed to promote long-term savings starting in childhood and expand access to affordable mortgages in adulthood.

Baiterek's housing functions were further streamlined during the COVID-19 pandemic, when Baiterek Development JSC and Housing Construction Guarantee Fund were consolidated into the Kazakhstan Housing Company. This entity now serves as a wholesale institution responsible for guaranteeing and subsidizing housing development and construction projects.

Otbasy Bank, another subsidiary of Baiterek Holding, manages retail housing and mortgage lending, providing nearly 66% of all mortgage loans in Kazakhstan. As of 2022, Otbasy Bank and the Kazakhstan Housing Company — both subsidiaries of Baiterek—acted as the exclusive operators of the Nurly Zher program.

=== Promotion of Export ===
Baiterek's support for export-oriented enterprises plays an important role in diversifying Kazakhstan's economy. One example is the Export Insurance Company KazakhExport JSC, created to promote exports of non-mineral goods and services. KazakhExport's primary tools include trade finance and insurance, with their total notional volumes reaching ₸326.5 billion and ₸204.7 billion, respectively, as of 2021.

=== Agricultural Financing ===
In 2021, Baiterek assumed responsibility for promoting agricultural financing following its integration with KazAgro Holding. As part of this process, the Agrarian Credit Corporation JSC and KazAgroFinance JSC became subsidiaries of Baiterek after their former parent company, KazAgro Holding, was merged into the Holding. These two subsidiaries are tasked with advancing the agro-industrial sector through industrialization and diversification, supported by sustainable and accessible financing mechanisms. In 2022, additional restructuring led to KazAgroFinance becoming a direct subsidiary of Agrarian Credit Corporation.

== Governance ==
The holding is fully owned by the Government of Kazakhstan. Strategic management is carried out by the board of directors and implemented by the executive management team.

The Board of Directors includes

- Olzhas Bektenov - Prime Minister of Kazakhstan
- Nurlybek Nalibaev - First Deputy Prime Minister
- Serik Zhumangarin - Deputy Prime Minister
- Nurlan Baibazarov - Assistant to the President of Kazakhstan on economic affairs
- Madi Takiyev - Minister of Finance
- Yersain Nagaspayev - Minister of Industry and Construction
- Rustam Karagoishin - Chairman of the Management Board
- Charon Wardini bin Mokhzani - independent director (Chairman of Takaful Malaysia)
- Fred Zuliu Hu - independent director (Founder of Primavera Capital Group)
- Janusz Piechociński - independent director (former Deputy Prime Minister of Poland)

=== Past Chairpersons ===
- Erbolat Dosaev
- Qanat Şarlapaev
- Nurlan Baibazarov

== Credit Rating ==
On 20 October 2025, the international credit rating agency Fitch Ratings affirmed the long-term foreign- and local-currency issuer default ratings of Baiterek at "BBB" with a stable outlook, reflecting Fitch's view that the Kazakh government would provide "virtually certain" extraordinary support if needed under its Government-Related Entities criteria due to Baiterek's significant policy role as a holding company of national development institutions.

== See also ==
- Samruk-Kazyna
- National Investment Corporation of National Bank of Kazakhstan
- Economy of Kazakhstan
