= Nurzhan Subkhanberdin =

Kazakh oligarch (born 1964)

- Нұржан Сұбханбердин
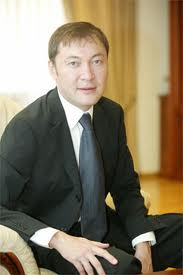
- Subkhanberdin in 2011
- Born: Nurzhan Salkenovich Subkhanberdin; 29 November 1964 (age 61); Almaty, Kazakh SSR, Soviet Union
- Education: Moscow State University
- Spouse: Zhanar Erzhanovna Abisheva
- Children: 8

Nurjan Salkenuly Subhanberdin (Kazakh: Нұржан Сәлкенұлы Сұбханбердин, romanized: Nurjan Sälkenuly Subhanberdin; born 29 November 1964) is a Kazakh businessman and banker. He was the founder and former chairman of Kazkommertsbank, one of Kazakhstan's largest banks. Subkhanberdin is one of Kazakhstan's richest oligarchs with a fortune estimated in the billions of dollars. In 2007, he was the 664 on Forbes World Billionaire list, with $1.5 billion earned in the banking industry.

== Early life ==
Subkhanberdin was born in Almaty, Kazakhstan on 29 November 1964.

He completed his education at Moscow State University from where he graduated with a degree in political economy in 1988. It is thought that he attended Moscow State University at the same time as Timur Kulibayev, who is married to the daughter of the former Kazakh President Nursultan Nazarbayev.

== Career ==
In 2008, with six other Kazakh businessmen, he spent $100 million on a project to open the first British private school in Central Asia, Haileybury Almaty, to get a British education for his children.

In March 2011, he met with President Nursultan Nazarbayev to talk about the economy of Kazakhstan.

Subkhanberdin owns real estate properties including a mansion in London and two villas that extend onto a private island on the Côte d’Azur. He previously also owned two condos at the Mandarin Oriental Residences in New York City.

Subkhanberdin sold his stake in Kazkommertsbank and withdrew from the board of directors of Kazkommertsbank in 2015.

Almaty airport was a property of the Kazkommertsbank group of Nurzhan Subkhanberdin, the bank's founder, and Mynbayev, and then progressively fell into the hands of the Kulibayev family.

== Controversies ==
=== Ermūhamet Ertısbaev interview ===
In 2004, when Interfax interviewed Ermūhamet Ertısbaev in November 2004, he referred Subkhanberdin as "Kazakh Khodorkovsky." Ertısbaev, speaking in favor of legislation that would limit the abilities of "various elite groups" to influence politics through lobbying, told Interfax that "in the transition period, in the post-Soviet area, any attempt from the oligarchs to influence... the president, the Parliament and the government can result in serious political cataclysms." Critics, such as reporters for Respublika, said the government's de-monopolization campaign would give Kazakhstanis a chance "to see how the government will put monopolists and their protectors from the head of state's inner circle in their place."

=== Meridian ===
In November 2017 the OCCRP published an investigation into Meridian based on the Paradise Papers leak. According to the OCCRP findings, in 2006 Subkhanberdin was the largest single shareholder of Meridian with a 25% stake.

Meridian Capital is an international investment firm headquartered in Hong Kong with a diversified investment portfolio spanning consumer goods, real estate and hospitality; as well as a strategic global investments in the natural resources sector.

== Personal life ==
Subkhanberdin is married to Zhanar Erzhanovna Abisheva.
