= Nurlan Baibazarov =

Kazakh politician

- Нұрлан Байбазаров
- Baibazarov in 2024

Assistant to the President on Economic Affairs
- Incumbent
- Assumed office 25 March 2026
- President: Kassym-Jomart Tokayev
- Preceded by: Qanat Şarlapaev

Deputy Prime Minister – Minister of National Economy
- In office 6 February 2024 – 21 December 2024
- President: Kassym-Jomart Tokayev
- Prime Minister: Oljas Bektenov
- Preceded by: Älibek Quantyrov (Economy)
- Succeeded by: Serik Jumanğarin

Personal details
- Born: 10 October 1975 (age 50) Kazakh SSR, Soviet Union
- Children: 6
- Education: Narxoz University

Nūrlan Serıkūly Baibazarov (Kazakh: Нұрлан Серікұлы Байбазаров; born 10 October 1975) is a Kazakh politician and economist, who was served as the Assistant to the President on Economic Affairs since 2026. From 6 February to 21 December 2024 he was the Deputy Prime Minister and Minister of National Economy.

== Education ==
Baibazarov finished his studied at the Kazakh State Academy of Management in 1997, where he became an economist.

== Career ==
Baibazarov started his professional career in the Ministry of Finance, in 1997. In the years 2004 to 2011, he worked in the Development Bank of Kazakhstan, where he rose among the ranks from department chief to executive director.

From 2013 to 2016, Baibazarov was director of the Development of Economic Sectors Department of the National Economy Ministry. At times, he also served in various government-affiliated companies, such as Kazakhstan Temir Joly and KazMunayGas.

In 2016, he was appointed as member of the council of directors of the Industrial Development Fund. Later becoming Chairman of the Fund, he left it in November 2022, to be Chairman of the Development Bank of Kazakhstan.

Baibazarov was promoted to Chairman of the Baiterek National Holding on 5 October 2023.

On 6 February 2024, President Tokayev appointed Baibazarov as Deputy Prime Minister of Kazakhstan – Minister of National Economy. On 21 December of the same year, he was removed from the position. Radio Free Europe has found his ministerial work to be insignificant.

On 15 October 2025, appointed Head of the newly formed Department of Investment and Trade.

On 25 March 2026, by Presidential Decree No. 1214 Baibazarov was relieved of duties and appointed Assistant to the President for Economic Affairs, replacing Qanat Şarlapaev.

== Awards ==
- Medal for Distinguished Labor.

== Personal life ==
Baibazarov is married to Aliya Baibazarova. They have six children. Baibazarov speaks Kazakh, Russian, and English.
