= Umut Shayakhmetova =

Chairperson of Halyk Bank of Kazakhstan

Umut Shayakhmetova (Kazakh: Úmit Bolathanqyzy Shaıahmetova, born 1969) is a Kazakh businesswoman. She serves as chairperson of the management board of Halyk Bank, a listed bank on the Kazakhstan and London Stock Exchanges.

== Early life ==
In 1993, Shayakhmetova Umut graduated from the Peoples' Friendship University of Russia (also known as RUDN University) with a Bachelor of Economic Sciences.

In 1996, she graduated from Rutgers University, New Jersey, US, with an MBA degree.

== Career ==
Shayakhmetova began working in 1997–1998 as a specialist of structural financing for ZAO SB ABN AMRO Bank Kazakhstan (ZAO). From 1998 to 2000 she was chair of the management board of PAMC “ABN AMRO Asset Management”. From 2000 to 2004 she served as deputy chair of the board of ZAO. She supervised the corporate lending unit in the Kazakhstan subsidiary of a Dutch bank.

In 2001 she became a member of the Expert Council of the National Securities Commission of the Republic of Kazakhstan.

From November 2004 to January 2009 she served as deputy chair of the board for lending at Halyk Bank of Kazakhstan JSC (Halyk) On January 22, 2009, she was appointed chair of the Halyk board, replacing Grigori Marchenko. On May 7, 2009, she was elected as a member of the Halyk Board.

In May 2011 she became president of the Gymnastics Federation of the Republic of Kazakhstan and a member of the executive committee of the National Olympic Committee of the Republic of Kazakhstan.

In November 2012 she was elected as a member of UnionPay International Council.

In June 2015 she became Chair of the Council of businesswomen of Almaty National Chamber of Entrepreneurs «Atameken».

In June 2016 she became Chair of the UnionPay International Regional Council in the region of Eastern Europe, Central Asia, Russia and the Caucasus. She also became Chair of the Financial Sector Committee of the Presidium of the National Chamber of Entrepreneurs «Atameken».

== Awards ==
- Eren enbegi Ushin medal (2006).
- Order of Parasat (2011).
- Order of Barys 3 degrees (2016).

== Personal life ==
Her father was Tayzhan, Bolatkhan Kulzhanuly (March 8, 1941 - February 20, 2007). He served as Secretary General of the Foreign Ministry of the Kazakh SSR, First Deputy Minister of Foreign Economic Relations of Kazakhstan, ambassador to Egypt, Algeria, Jordan, Libya, Morocco, Syria and Tunisia. He was a representative of Kazakhstan in the Organization of Islamic Conference and ambassador to Malaysia.

Her mother was Tayzhanova, Alla Sadvokasovna (b. 1944).
