= Home Credit & Finance Bank =

Russian retail bank

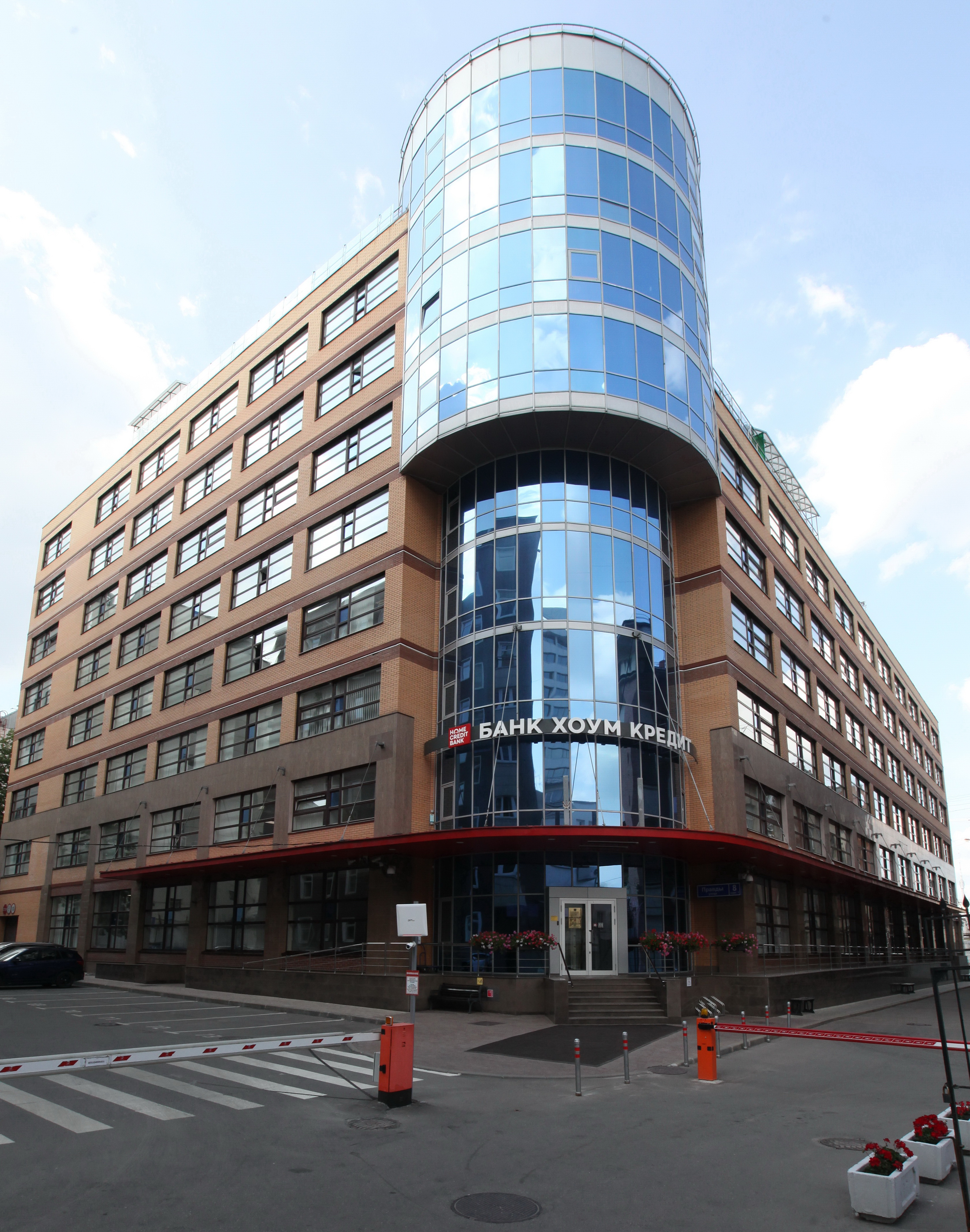
- Trade name: Home Bank, Home Credit Bank
- Native name: Хоум Банк, ХКФ Банк
- Company type: LLC
- Industry: Financial services
- Predecessor: Innovation Bank Technopolis
- Founded: 2002; 24 years ago
- Headquarters: Moscow, Russia
- Area served: Russia
- Key people: Alexander Skabara (Chairman of the Board), Jiri J Smejc (Directors Board Chairman)
- Products: Loans
- Revenue: 69,766,000,000 Russian ruble (2019)
- Operating income: ▲RUB 46.2 billion (2019)
- Net income: ▲RUB 15.8 billion (2019)
- Total assets: ▲RUB 343.8 billion (2019)
- Total equity: ▲RUB 84.4 billion (2019)
- Owner: PPF
- Parent: Home Credit BV
- Subsidiaries: Home Credit Bank Kazakhstan, JSC
- Rating: BB− (Fitch) (2020); A(RU) (ACRA) (2022) ruBBB+ (Expert RA) (2022)
- Website: www.homecredit.ru

Home Credit Bank (Russian: Хоум Банк) is a Russian retail bank headquartered in Moscow. It was registered by the Bank of Russia in 1992 under the name Innovation Bank "Technopolis". It was acquired by the Czech finance group Home Credit in 2002, after which the bank was rename HCF Bank (Russian: ХКФ банк). It specialises on providing installment loans for online purchases.

As of 2019, it ranked 35th largest in Russia in terms of assets, and it was among the top 15 banks in the Russian retail lending market and was rated Fitch "CC", Expert RA "ruBBB+" and ACRA "A(RU)". In November 2020, the bank was headed by Dmitry Peshnev-Podolsky.

In November 2023, the bank was sanctioned by the U.S. Department of the Treasury's Office of Foreign Assets Control (OFAC), together with other Russian banks in response to the Russian invasion of Ukraine. Its Czech parent company PPF decided to sell the Russian business in response. It In February 2024, Sovcombank announced its intention to buy Home Credit. The deal is planned to be completed in 2024–2025. 51% will be purchased for shares of Sovcombank's additional issue (5%), then the remaining 49% for cash.

== History ==
The bank was founded in 1992 under the name Innovative Bank Technopolis. In 2002, it was acquired by Home Credit Group and renamed as Home Credit and Finance Bank. On July 16 of the same year, the first loan under the Home Credit brand was issued in Russia.

In 2006, the bank launched a mortgage lending program. In 2007, the bank became a leader in the credit card market in Russia and was one of the first in the market to hold the 0-0-24 promotion. Home Credit began to move from a monoline bank model to a universal retail bank. A car loan program was launched and deposits from individuals began to be attracted and debit cards began to be issued.

During the 2008 financial crisis, Home Credit continued to be profitable and focused on cash loans and point-of-sale loans, curtailing mortgages and car loans.

In 2017, the bank rebranded and updated its logo and corporate identity. Home Credit began to focus on a younger audience that preferred online shopping. In the summer of 2017, Home Credit Bank launched the first Buy now, pay later platform which brought together goods on installment from partner stores. In 2017, the bank also issued an installment card with the ability to pay not only in the bank's partner network, but also in any store of the client's choice. HCFB in 2017, was the first in Russia to launch the business idea of interest-free instalments, which since 2007 were launched in large retail chains in the format of 0–0–24, 0–0–10. By 2019, Home Credit Russia had a market share to 22% within Point of Sale (POS) loans.

In 2018, the bank was the first to issue a loan with completely remote customer identification through a Russian biometric identification system called Unite Biometric System. In 2020, HCFB was the first to implement the purchasing of goods in instalments directly on the social network VKontakte.

In November 2023, the bank was sanctioned by the U.S. Department of the Treasury's Office of Foreign Assets Control (OFAC), together with other Russian banks, under E.O. 14024 for operating or having operated in the financial services sector of the Russian Federation economy in response to the Russian invasion of Ukraine.

In 2022 Czech parent company PPF agreed to sell HCFB to a group of local investors after sanctions from the US in response to the sanctions.

== Operations ==
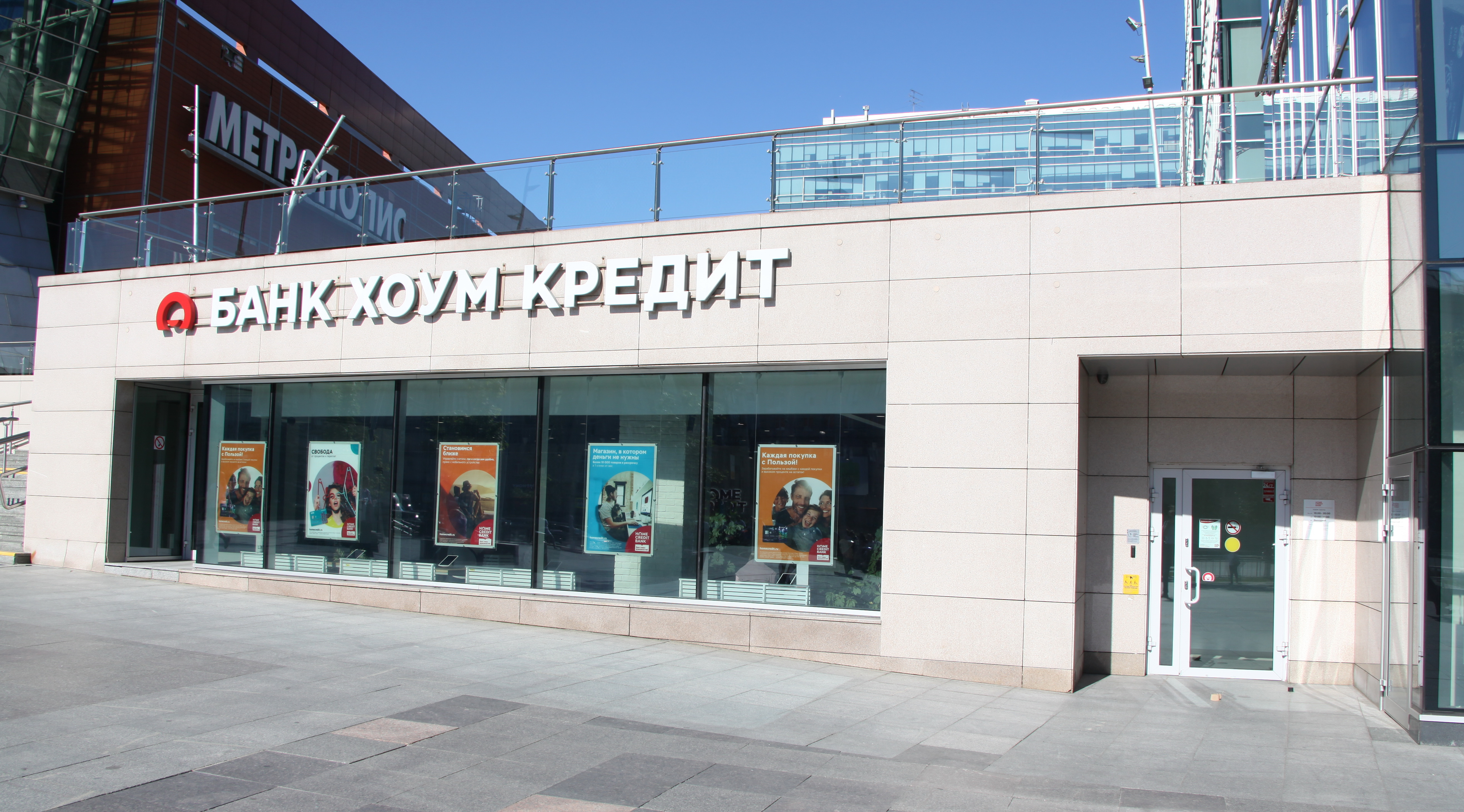
Office of Home Credit Bank near Voykovskaya metro station in Moscow

Through the wide branch network in Russia (more than 116 thousand points of sale) and online channels, HCFB offers POS loans and installments, unsecured cash loans, credit and debit cards, deposits.

The bank is one of the two Russian instalment card issuers in the country and develops its product under the Svoboda brand. Together with its sister companies "Always YES" (Credit Brokerage) and "Forward Leasing" (Leasing), HCFB forms an ecosystem of loans for purchases.
