= Kazkommertsbank =

Private bank located in Kazakhstan

- Company type: Joint stock company
- Industry: Finance and Insurance
- Founded: 1990
- Defunct: July 27, 2018
- Fate: Acquired and merged
- Successor: Halyk Bank
- Headquarters: Almaty, Kazakhstan
- Key people: Nina Zhusupova, Chairman; Nurzhan Subkhanberdin
- Products: Banking services
- Revenue: 19,023 million KZT (2009)
- Website: www.qazkom.kz

Kazkommertsbank (Kazakh: Қазкоммерцбанк, romanized: Qazkommertsbank) was the largest private bank in Kazakhstan with a total market share of 24% until 2018. Kazkommertsbank was a large provider of banking services and other financial products to large and medium-sized corporations in all sectors of Kazakh economy. Kazkommertsbank merged with Halyk Bank on 27 July 2018.

Its commercial banking business primarily consisted of corporate banking, trade and project finance, personal banking, debit and credit card services and foreign currency trading. Its principal activities were the acceptance of deposits and the provision of loans and credit facilities in Tenge and foreign currencies. The Bank was also a major participant in the securities market and the foreign currency market in Kazakhstan.

== History ==
In 2013, the bank introduced "mini-mobile POS terminals" for customers to be able to use a smart phone or tablet computer to accept credit card payments. According to CISTRAN Finance, the increase in card payments in 2012 led to a 0.6 percent growth in Kazakhstan's GDP.

== See also ==
- Banks of Kazakhstan
- Nurzhan Subkhanberdin
