= KazakhGold =

Company of Kazakhstan

Kazakhgold
- Key people: Mikhail Prokhorov, CEO

Kazakhgold is a gold mining company based in Kazakhstan. It has gold mines at Aksu, Bestobe and Zholymbet and is one of Kazakhstan's largest mining companies.

== Polyus ==
Kazakhgold had originally been founded by the Assaubayev family. In 2009 they sold a 50.1% stake to Polyus Gold, a Russian mining company. The stake subsequently increased to 65% and a reverse takeover was planned. Polyus subsequently alleged that the Assaubayevs had misled Polyus or tried to siphon off money from Kazakhgold. Kazahkgold's offices were raided by the Kazakh authorities. In December 2010, Polyus agreed to sell its stake back to the Assaubayev family and dropped its legal action; Polyus' share price soared.
