= National Investment Corporation of National Bank of Kazakhstan =

Kazakhstan government corporation

National Investment Corporation
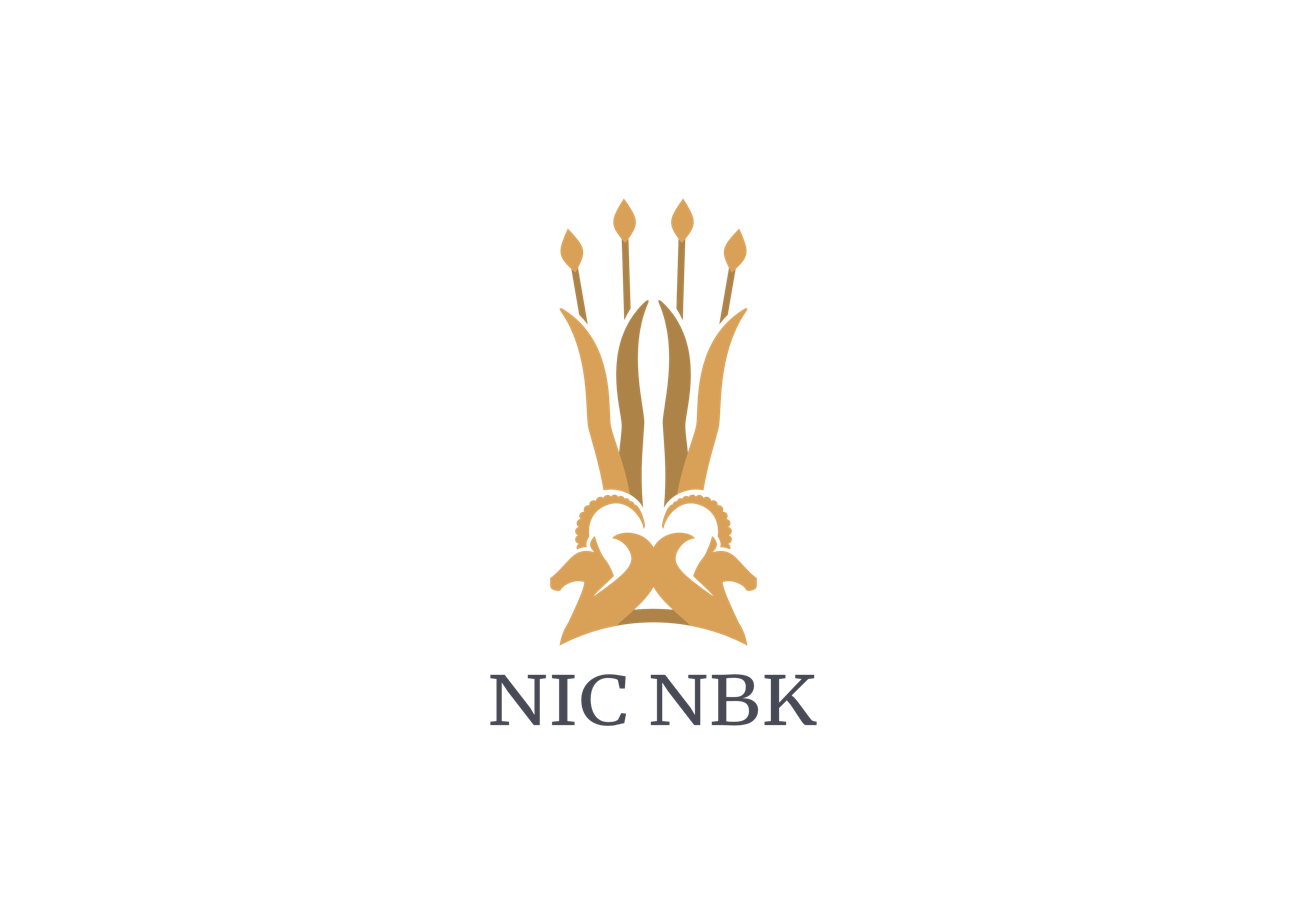
- Type: State-owned enterprise
- Industry: Fund management
- Founded: 1 October 2012; 13 years ago
- Headquarters: Nur-Sultan, Kazakhstan
- Services: Institutional investor
- Owner: National Bank of Kazakhstan
- Number of employees: 51 (2021)
- Website: www.nicnbk.kz

National Investment Corporation of the National Bank of Kazakhstan (NIC) is a Kazakhstan government owned investment corporation that was established in October 2012 to preserve and enhance the long-term purchasing power of Kazakhstan’s foreign exchange reserves. The National Fund investments in less liquid high yielding asset classes.

The NIC manages assets entrusted to it by the National Bank of Kazakhstan. NIC invests in private equity, hedge funds, real estate and infrastructure through external managers and has signed up to the Santiago Principles on best practice in managing sovereign wealth funds.

In order to achieve its goals the NIC will invest in alternative asset classes in the international financial markets with investment horizon of 10–20 years, and other types of activities involving trust asset management.

== History ==
NIC was established under the initiative of the Governor of National Bank of Kazakhstan and under the agreement of the President of the Republic of Kazakhstan. It is a 100% subsidiary of the National Bank.

The hiring policy of NIC is orientated in hiring specialist with international education and/or experience.

== Investments ==
NIC’s mandate is to invest in alternative asset classes such as private equity, hedge funds, real estate and infrastructure.

== Cooperation ==
NIC is one of 30 members of International Forum of Sovereign Wealth Funds (combined account for 80% assets managed by SWFs) and one of 31 members of CROSAPF (Co-Investment Roundtable Of Sovereign And Pension Funds).

== See also ==
- Sovereign Wealth Funds
- Economy of Kazakhstan
