= Ministry of Trade and Integration (Kazakhstan) =

Government ministry of Kazakhstan

Ministry of Trade and Integration of the Republic of Kazakhstan
- Қазақстан Республикасы Сауда және интеграция министрлігі (Kazakh); Министерство торговли и интеграции Республики Казахстан (Russian)
- Emblem of Kazakhstan

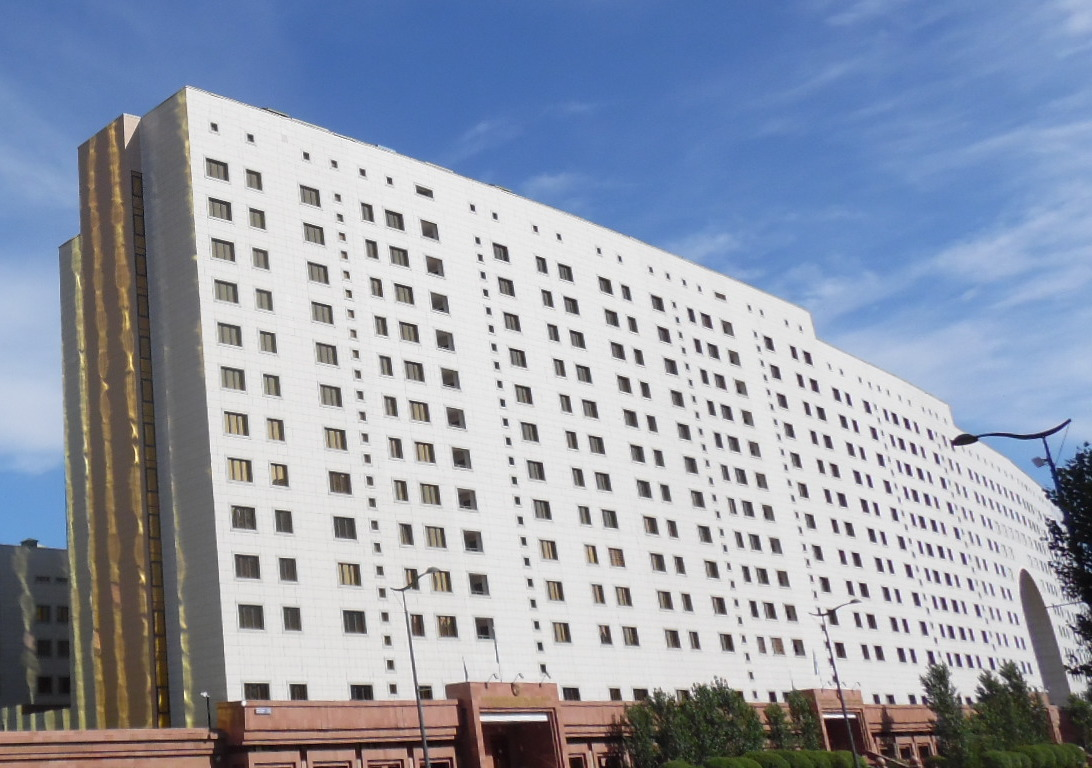
- House of Ministries

Agency overview
- Formed: 17 June 2019
- Jurisdiction: Government of Kazakhstan
- Headquarters: Astana, Kazakhstan
- Agency executive: Arman Shakkaliev, Minister
- Website: Official website

The Ministry of Trade and Integration of the Republic of Kazakhstan (MTI RK, Kazakh: Қазақстан Республикасы Сауда және интеграция министрлігі, romanized: Qazaqstan Respublikasy Sauda jäne integratsiia ministrlıgı, ҚР СИМ; Russian: Министерство торговли и интеграции Республики Казахстан, МТИ РК) is a central executive body of the Government of Kazakhstan, formed by the decree of the President of Kazakhstan on 17 June 2019 with the transfer of functions and powers from the Ministry of National Economy in the field of formation and implementation of domestic and foreign trade policies, international economic integration, consumer protection; Ministry of Industry and Infrastructure Development in the field of technical regulation, standardization and ensuring the uniformity of measurements, and the Ministry of Foreign Affairs on coordination of activities in the field of export promotion.

== History ==
Formed with the transfer to him functions and powers:

- Of the Ministry of National Economy of the Republic of Kazakhstan in the field of the formation and implementation of internal and foreign trade policies, international economic integration, consumer rights protection;
- Of the Ministry of Industry and Infrastructure Development of the Republic of Kazakhstan in the field of technical regulation, standardization and ensuring unity of measurements;
- Ministry of Foreign Affairs of the Republic of Kazakhstan for coordination of activities in the field of export promotion.

== Functions ==
- Development and regulation of foreign trade activities, international trade and economic relations, including regulating international economic integration;
- Development and promotion of exports of not raw goods and services;
- Development and regulation of internal trade, improvement of trade infrastructure, development of stock exchange and electronic commerce;
- Implementation of intersectoral coordination of action of state bodies in the areas of consumer rights protection, technical regulation, standardization and ensuring measurement uniformity, including strategic, control, realization and regulatory functions.
