= Eurasian Bank =

Ninth largest lender

Eurasian Bank JSC
- Native name: Kazakh: «Еуразиялық банк» АҚ «Eýrazııalyq bank» AQ; Russian: АО «Евразийский банк»
- Company type: JSC – Joint Stock Company
- Traded as: KASE: EUBN
- Industry: Financial services
- Founded: 1994
- Headquarters: Almaty, Kazakhstan
- Area served: Kazakhstan, Russia
- Key people: Lyazzat Satiyeva(CEO)
- Products: Asset management, consumer banking, corporate banking, credit cards, mortgage loans, private banking, wealth management
- Revenue: ▲KZT 52.5 billion (2013); KZT 38.4 billion (2012)
- Operating income: ▲KZT 17.3 billion (2013); KZT 13.1 billion (2012)
- Net income: ▲KZT 13.1 billion (2013); KZT 9.8 billion (2012)
- Total assets: ▲KZT 588.6 billion (2013); KZT 470.5 billion (2012)
- Total equity: ▲KZT 58.8 billion (2013); KZT 47.8 billion (2012)
- Number of employees: > 5,500 (2013)
- Website: https://eubank.kz/

Eurasian Bank JSC is the ninth-largest lender in Kazakhstan, headquartered in Almaty. It was founded in 1994 as a closed joint-stock company, and reregistered in 2003 as a joint stock company due to joint stock company law changes. The Bank is owned 100% by Eurasian Financial Company JSCwhich is 100% owned by three equal shareholders: Alexander Mashkevich, Alijan Ibragimov, Patokh Shodiyev (aka Patokh Chodiev)

== Management ==
On September 13, 2022, Lyazzat Satiyeva was elected as the chairman of Management Board of Eurasian Bank JSC (Kazakhstan).

== Ratings ==
On April 30, 2020, the international rating agency Moody's Investors Service (Moody's) retained the rating of Eurasian Bank at B2 and the basic credit rating of b3, the outlook for the bank's long-term operations in national and foreign currencies was lowered to "negative" following the worsening of general forecasts for the banking sector and economy of Kazakhstan.

On October 17, 2019, the management of Eurasian Bank JSC decided to continue cooperation only with the rating agency Moody’s Investors Service.

Eurasian Bank has a B+ Long-term Counterparty Credit Rating with Positive outlook and a kzBBB+ local scale rating from Standard & Poor's, it has had these ratings since the December 2011 upgrade.

The bank also has a B1 Long-term foreign currency deposit rating with Negative outlook from Moody's Investors Service, it has had this rating since 2003, and the negative outlook has been in place since 2009.

== Criticism ==
On January 16, 2015, Tatyana Burnakina, Executive Director of the Department of Bank Cards and Payment Services, allowed herself to criticize the professional activities of her bank employees, giving an interview to the Krasnoyarsk edition Newslab.ru. Among other things, Burnakina stated about the facts of fraud and theft in the bank. On January 19, 2015, the press service of the bank disseminated information in the media about the termination of the employment contract with Tatyana Burnakina for gross violations of the code of ethics and business conduct

== History ==
History section based on press releases and chronology found on company website.

=== 1990s ===
- December 1994 – Eurasian Bank was registered as Joint Stock Bank by National Bank of Kazakhstan
- February 1995 – Bank received General License to fulfill bank operations
- March 1996 – Receipt of License for broker and dealer activity
- April 1996 – Becomes prime dealer on Government securities
- May 1996 – Bank became the member of Kazakhstan Stock Exchange
- September 1997 – Receipt of the License for broker activity with Government securities
- September 1997 – Bank became member of SWIFT
- April 1998 – Receipt of License for custodian activity

=== 2000s ===
- February 2000 – Bank became member of the Deposit Guarantee System
- November 2000 – Became a member of VISA International
- January 2002 – Receipt of the license to fulfill bank operations in tenge and foreign currencies
- July 2003 – Moody’s rating agency assigned Bank a B1 rating for long term and NP rating for short-term deposits in foreign currency, E for Financial Strength Rating. Outlook Stable
- October 2004 – Became a member of Kazakhstan Fund for mortgage loans guarantee
- July 2006 – Fitch rating agency assigned the Bank with B− Issuer’s Default Rating, and B short-term rating. Outlook Stable
- November 2006 – Standard & Poor’s assigned Bank В/В long and short-term ratings, kzBB national scale rating, Outlook Stable
- July 2007 – Standard & Poor's changed its Outlook to Positive from Stable. Credit ratings B/B were confirmed. Bank’s local national scale rating was upgraded to kzBВB- from kzBВ
- September 2008 – Visa International raises the status of the Bank to Principal Member
- December 2008 – Eurasian Bank and Visa presented world's first exclusive card with diamond and gold ornaments – VISA Infinite Eurasian Diamond Card.
- October 2009 – Appointment of the new chairman of the management board (CEO) – Mr. Michael Eggleton

=== 2010s ===
- April 2010 – Completion of the acquisition of 99.99% of the shares of Bank Troika Dialog in Moscow
- June 2010 – Moody's Investors Service assigned a rating of B1 for debt in local currency
- February 2011 – Acquisition of Micro Credit Organization ProstoCredit from Société Générale
- December 2011 – Standard & Poor's raises the credit rating of the Bank to B/B, the local rating from kzBB to kzBB+, and changes the outlook from negative to stable
- December 2011 – The Bank ends the year with more than 450 points of sale throughout Kazakhstan. Client numbers increased by 250,000 to 419,000
- July 2012 – Euromoney magazine named Eurasian Bank as Best Bank in Kazakhstan
- July 2012 – Kazakhstani Rating Agency KzRating upgraded the credit rating of the Bank on a national scale from BBB to A− and the international scale from BB− to BB with a Stable outlook
- December 2012 – The Bank ends the year with 1,900 points of sale and 648,000 clients
- January 2013 – Eurasian Bank opens its Private Banking branch for VIP clients, offering wealth management services from international partners
- January 2013 – Eurasian Bank becomes principal member of MasterCard
- February 2013 – Eurasian Bank launches its Branch of the Future plan with automated electronic cashiers in to branches in Almaty and Atyrau
- May 2013 – Michael Eggleton, the CEO, received the CEO of the Year – 2013 award from the American Chamber of Commerce in Kazakhstan
- July 2013 – Standard & Poor's Maintains the credit rating of the Bank at B+/B+, raises the local rating from kzBBB to kzBBB+, and changes the outlook from stable to positive
- December 2013 – Eurasian Bank completes first retail loan assignment & servicing transaction in Kazakhstan market. Essentially, a synthetic securitization.
- February 2014 – Moody's rating agency reaffirms Eurasian Bank's B1 rating
- June 2014 – Eurasian Bank launches mobile banking for retail customersOn October 21, 2015, a deal was concluded to acquire 100% of the shares of BankPozitiv Kazakhstan JSC.
- December 2016 – June 2019 – Pavel Loginov was appointed Chairman of the Board of the Bank.

=== 2020s ===
- December 2020 – the transaction for the sale of 100% of the shares of JSC SB Eurasian Bank (Russia) was completed, the buyer was Sovcombank PJSC.
