= Halyk Bank =

Quoted bank in Kazakhstan

- Company type: Joint Stock Company
- Traded as: KASE: HSBK; LSE: HSBK
- Industry: Banking, Financial services
- Founded: 1923
- Headquarters: Almaty, Kazakhstan
- Area served: Kazakhstan, Kyrgyzstan, Georgia, Russia, Tajikistan, Uzbekistan
- Key people: Alexander Pavlov (Chairman); Umut Shayakhmetova (Chairperson of the Management Board)
- Revenue: ▲380.2 billion tenge (2020)
- Net income: ▲352.6 billion tenge (2020)
- Total assets: ▲12,1 trillion tenge (2022)
- Total equity: ▲1,493.2 billion tenge (2020)
- Number of employees: 13,452 (2020)
- Subsidiaries: Halyk Bank Kyrgyzstan; Halyk Bank Georgia; Moskommertsbank; Kazkommertsbank Tajikistan; Tenge Bank
- Website: halykbank.kz

Halyk Bank (Kazakh: Қазақстан Халық Жинақ Банкі, romanized: Qazaqstan Halyq Jınaq Banki) is a commercial savings bank in Kazakhstan that also has branches in Kyrgyzstan, Georgia, Russia, Tajikistan and Uzbekistan. Its full Kazakh name translates into English as "Peoples' Savings Bank of Kazakhstan Joint-Stock Company". In Russian-language sources, the bank is often referred to as Narodny sberegatelny bank Kazakhstana (Народный сберегательный банк Казахстана), the Russian equivalent of the name. The bank is the legal successor of the Soviet-era Sberbank in Kazakhstan, analogous to Sberbank in Russia. Halyk Bank is headquartered in the city of Almaty, which was the country's capital until 1997.

Halyk Bank merged with Kazkommertsbank on 27 July 2018. Halyk is Kazakhstan's largest bank with a 35% market share.

Due to protests in January 2022 in Kazakhstan, the share of Halyk bank traded at London Stock Exchange fell 16%.

== Overview ==
Halyk Bank was the successor entity of the Savings Bank of the USSR in the Republic of Kazakhstan.

On May 21, 2019, Halyk Bank rose to 1522 place from 1595 last year in the annual rating of the largest and most influential public companies in the world Global 2000, continuing to be the only representative from Kazakhstan.

On June 20, 2019, according to the results of the annual selection of the "Europe Banking Awards 2018" of the well-known international analytical magazine "EMEA Finance", Halyk Bank was awarded the title of "The Best Bank in Kazakhstan".

In 2019, Halyk Bank opened a 100% owned subsidiary in Uzbekistan, Tenge Bank.

== Owners ==
As of January 1, 2020, the major shareholder of Halyk Bank of Kazakhstan JSC is ALMEX Holding Group JSC with a share of 64.5% of the total number of offered (excluding repurchased) shares of the Halyk Bank. JSC ALMEX Holding Group is controlled on a parity basis by Timur Kulibayev and his wife Dinara Kulibayeva, son-in-law and daughter of former President of Kazakhstan Nursultan Nazarbayev.

== Management ==
The chairman of the bank's board since 2009 has been Umut Shayakhmetova, the chairman of the board of directors is Aleksandr Pavlov.

== See also ==
- Banks of Kazakhstan
