= Home Credit =

International consumer finance provider

Home Credit B.V.
- Trade name: Home Credit Group
- Industry: Consumer loans and Personal loans
- Founded: 1997 (as Home Credit a.s.); 1999 (as Home Credit B.V.)
- Headquarters: Amsterdam, Netherlands and Prague, Czech Republic
- Area served: Eastern Europe, Central Europe, Asia and United States
- Operating income: € 4.249 billion (2019)
- Net income: € 400 million (2019)
- Total assets: € 26.590 billion (2019)
- Total equity: € 2.873 billion (2019)
- Owner: PPF Group
- Number of employees: 116,700 (2019)
- Website: homecredit.net

Home Credit B.V. is an international consumer finance company founded in 1997 in the Czech Republic and headquartered in the Netherlands. The company provides installment loans, point-of-sale financing and other consumer credit products, primarily in emerging markets, with a focus on customers with limited credit histories. Home Credit is part of PPF Group, a Czech investment group.

Founded as a Czech financial company, Home Credit expanded internationally during the 2000s and became one of the largest consumer finance providers in Asia and Central and Eastern Europe. The company has historically served more than 100 million customers worldwide and distributes its products through retail partnerships and digital platforms.

== History ==
In 1997, Home Credit a.s. was founded in the Czech Republic and in 1999, the company expanded to Slovakia. In 2000s company started to expand to Commonwealth of Independent States countries - Russia, Kazakhstan, Ukraine and Belarus. As of 2007 the company was the second largest consumer lender in Russia. In 2010s company expanded to Asia, specifically China, India, Indonesia, Philippines and Vietnam. In 2010 the company was the first foreign company to set up as a consumer finance lender in China. In 2015 Home Credit Group launched its operations in the United States of America through a partnership with Sprint Corporation. The group offers loans in 434,232 retail stores and also in digital space.

In 2017 PAG initiated investment of 2 billion RMB into Home Credit Group's Chinese business entity as an interest-bearing convertible loan. The deal was subsequently terminated in 2018 by PAG and Home Credit Group repaid the loan with interest.

In 2018 Home Credit Group initiated sale of its Czech operation consisting of Home Credit Czech and Slovak and Air Bank to Moneta Money Bank. The deal was criticized as one-sided deal that gives Home Credit's subsidiaries unusually high valuation with unusual terms of the deal that would lead to renaming of Moneta Bank to Air Bank. The criticism was strengthened also because of Moneta Chief Executive Tomas Spurny being historically connected to Home Credit Group majority shareholder PPF Group. In February 2019, Moneta based on feedback from its shareholders revised offer with lower valuation. In October 2019, Home Credit India has tied up with The Karur Vysya Bank Ltd, a commercial bank having its head office at Karur, Tamil Nadu, India for joint lending.

In 2019, the company was preparing IPO in Hong Kong, however it was scrapped after investors estimated the value between 5 and 7.5 billion euros, whereas shareholders were targeting market capitalization of 10 billion euros.

== Home Credit China ==
Home Credit entered China in 2007 and established Home Credit Consumer Finance, which began operations in 2010 after receiving approval as one of China's first consumer finance companies. It became the first wholly foreign-owned consumer finance company licensed in China and received a nationwide consumer finance license in 2014.

China became Home Credit's largest market and a key driver of its international expansion during the 2010s. By 2019, Home Credit Consumer Finance operated in more than 300 cities across 29 provincial-level regions and had served tens of millions of customers in China.

In 2019, Home Credit prepared an initial public offering on the Hong Kong Stock Exchange, but withdrew the offering after investors valued the company below the level sought by its shareholders.

In 2024, JD.com agreed to acquire a majority stake in Home Credit Consumer Finance, changing the ownership structure of the Chinese business. Following the transaction, Home Credit China became part of JD.com's consumer finance operations.

=== Criticism ===
Home Credit and its parent company PPF Group became involved in debates in the Czech Republic over business relations with China. In 2014, PPF helped arrage visit of the Czech president Miloš Zeman to China and subsequently helped pay for private plane for the return trip. In 2016, the company CEO Jiří Šmejc claimed to be proud of the impact on the revival of Czech-Chinese relations.

In 2019, Home Credit had hired C&B Reputation Management, a public relations agency, as part of a campaign to improve perceptions of China in the Czech Republic. It was also supposed to improve the Czech view of the Chinese communist regime.

Home Credit also funded the think tank Sinoskop, established in 2018 to analyse China-related issues. The funding attracted criticism from some China analysts, who argued that the organisation presented a more favourable view of China than established research groups such as Sinopsis.

== Home Credit Vietnam ==
Home Credit entered Vietnam in 2008, becoming the company's first major market in Southeast Asia. Home Credit Vietnam expanded through consumer lending products, including point-of-sale financing, cash loans and revolving loans, and became one of the leading consumer finance companies in the country.

By 2023, Home Credit Vietnam had served more than 15 million customers, operated around 14,000 points of sale and held approximately 14% of Vietnam's consumer finance market, making it the country's second-largest consumer finance provider.

In 2024, PPF Group agreed to sell Home Credit Vietnam to Siam Commercial Bank's parent company SCBX for approximately US$860 million. The transaction was later terminated in 2026 after the conditions required for completion were not fulfilled, and Home Credit Vietnam continued operating under Home Credit Group.

== See also ==
- Non-bank financial institution
