= Zamanbank =

Kazakh regional bank

Zaman-bank is one of the regional banks of Kazakhstan that mostly serves legal entities and individuals in Pavlodar province.

== History ==
Zaman-Bank was established on June 6, 1991, in Almaty as a private bank when it was granted a licence to operate a bank (license number is No. MP 11) by the National State Bank of the Kazakh Soviet Socialist Republic. The Kazakh name "Zaman" means "epoch" in English.

In September 1996, the bank became a joint stock company. In 1998, new shareholders of the bank decided to relocate from the city of Almaty to the city of Ekibastuz (Pavlodar province).

In 2003, Zaman-Bank opened a branch in Almaty city.

Since March 1, 2003, the bank is a full member of the Association of Legal Entities and Association of Financiers of Kazakhstan.

In 2003, the bank was among the first second-tier banks of Kazakhstan, which met the requirements of National Bank of Kazakhstan on the transition to International Accounting Standards. In the same year, the bank moved to the preparation of financial statements in accordance with International Financial Reporting Standards.

In May 2013, Zaman-Bank signed a partnership agreement with the Islamic Corporation for the Development of the Private Sector (ICD), a member of the Islamic Development Bank. Earlier, owners of Zaman Bank and the ICD had established the first Islamic Leasing (Ijara) Company in Kazakhstan. Since October 13, 2003, the bank is a member of mandatory collective guarantee of deposits of individuals. In 2014, Zaman-Bank officially announced its intention to become an Islamic bank.

On 17 August 2017, Zaman-Bank officially became an Islamic bank after receiving its licence from the National Bank of Kazakhstan. Zaman-Bank turned into the second-largest Islamic bank of the country.

== Governance ==
=== Board of directors ===
- Zhanat Kamitovich Ibrayevv (Chairman of the Board of Directors)
- Najmul Hassan
- Yelena Anatolyevna Gupalo
- Tasbulat Sovetovich Abguzhino
- Amer Bukvic

=== Management ===
- Tatyana Alexandrovna Stalmakova
- Rimma Slyamkhanovna Seitova
- Ilya Arkhimedovich Iskakov
- Diar Nurlanovich Smagulov
- Gulfairuz Yerlanovna Assayeva

=== Sharia Supervisory Board ===
- Dr. Muhammad al-Bashir
- Shaikh Dr. Salah Fhad Al Shalhoob
- Shaikh Muhammad Ahmad Sultan
