= Karagandy State University =

University in Karaganda, Kazakhstan

Karaganda State University
- Қарағанды мемлекеттік университеті
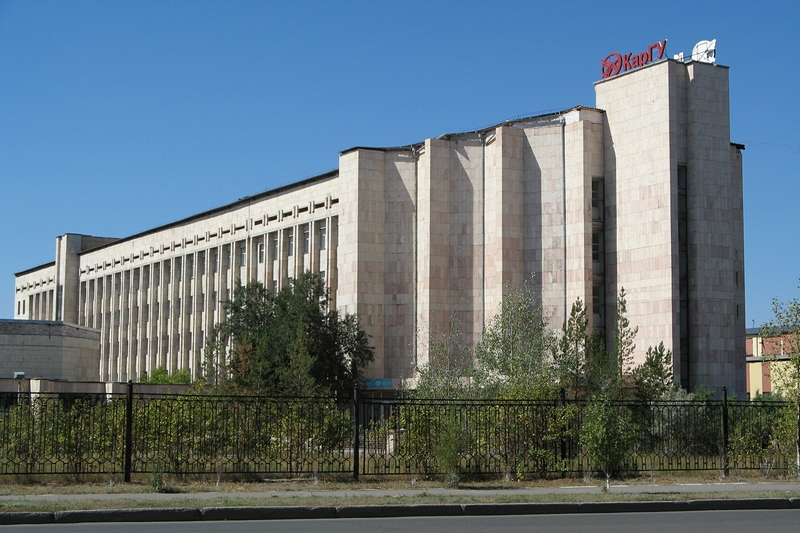
- The Karaganda State University in 2010
- Other names: Karaganda State University named after E. A. Buketov
- Established: 1972
- Location: Karaganda, Kazakhstan; 49.77°N 73.126°E
- Website: http://ksu.kz/?lang=en

University rankings

Regional – Overall
- QS Emerging Europe and Central Asia: 180 (2022)

Karaganda State University (Kazakh: Қарағанды мемлекеттік университеті, Qarağandy memlekettık universitetı) named after E. A. Buketov is a university in Karaganda, Kazakhstan, founded in 1972. Karaganda State University is the second university in the history of Kazakhstan, and it is one of the largest universities in the country.

KSU, being a classical university, has an important social and cultural mission. According to the traditions of classical universities, the university maintains high level and fundamental character of higher education. Karaganda State University is one of the leaders in education, science and culture of Kazakhstan. The prestige of Karaganda State University named after E.A. Buketov is confirmed by international cooperation. Different public universities, home and foreign institutes work as its partners.
