= Development Bank of Kazakhstan =

State development bank of Kazakhstan

- Native name: Қазақстанның Даму Банкі; Банк Развития Казахстана
- Type: Joint-stock company
- Industry: Development banking
- Founded: 2001
- Headquarters: Astana, Kazakhstan
- Key people: Marat Yelibayev (Chairman of the Management Board); Aidar Arifkhanov (Chairman of the Board of Directors)
- Net income: KZT 111.4 billion (2025, consolidated)
- Total assets: KZT 5,648 billion (2024)
- Total equity: KZT 961.987 billion (2024)
- Number of employees: 240 (2025)
- Parent: Baiterek National Managing Holding (100%)
- Website: kdb.kz

The Development Bank of Kazakhstan (DBK; Kazakh: Қазақстанның Даму Банкі; Russian: Банк Развития Казахстана) is a state-owned development bank in Kazakhstan that finances large investment projects in manufacturing, energy and infrastructure, as well as export operations. It was established in 2001 under a decree of President Nursultan Nazarbayev. Since 2013 it has been part of the Baiterek national managing holding. Its headquarters are in Astana.

== History ==
=== Establishment (2000–2001) ===
On 28 December 2000, President Nursultan Nazarbayev signed Decree No. 531 "On the Development Bank of Kazakhstan", instructing the government to establish the bank by 1 July 2001. The decree aimed to make state investment more effective, develop production infrastructure and manufacturing, and attract domestic and foreign investment into the real economy. The bank's main tasks were defined as medium- and long-term lending for the expansion, modernisation and creation of production facilities, and acting as a financial agent for budget-funded projects.

The Law "On the Development Bank of Kazakhstan", No. 178-II, setting out the bank's objectives, tasks and mandate, was adopted on 25 April 2001. On 18 May the government adopted Resolution No. 659 on incorporating the bank, and on 31 May the bank was registered with the Ministry of Justice. The bank's authorised capital was set at 30 billion tenge. Speaking to entrepreneurs in July 2001, Nazarbayev said that with the creation of the Development Bank, Kazakh business should start thinking about financial expansion into other countries.

=== Early years (2001–2009) ===
In its first three years the bank approved 20 investment projects with a total value of US$504.8 million, of which DBK's share was US$201 million; average loan terms were seven to nine years. To raise long-term funding, in 2003 the bank launched a US$400 million medium-term note programme listed on the Luxembourg Stock Exchange.

In 2006 the bank became part of the Kazyna Sustainable Development Fund, created in March of that year to bring together national development institutions to diversify the economy. After Kazyna's merger in 2008, the bank became part of the Samruk-Kazyna sovereign wealth fund. During the 2008–2009 financial crisis the bank maintained a high rate of lending to non-resource industries and infrastructure, while lending to the economy by commercial banks grew by only 7.3% in 2008. On 28 September 2009 the government decided to increase the bank's capital to 250 billion tenge, to make its bonds more attractive to foreign investors and secure funding amid a shortage of long-term liquidity on the domestic market.

=== Industrialisation (2010–2013) ===
In 2010 DBK became one of the main financial operators of the State Programme for Accelerated Industrial and Innovative Development for 2010–2014, approved by Nazarbayev's decree of 19 March 2010. In 2010 alone the bank approved six new projects worth US$1.35 billion, the DBK group commissioned 18 projects, and its funding base grew by 34% to US$5.2 billion. In December 2010 the bank placed US$500 million of five-year Eurobonds.

=== Part of Baiterek (since 2013) ===
Nazarbayev's Decree No. 571 of 22 May 2013 created the Baiterek national managing holding, to which DBK was transferred to streamline the management of development institutions. The bank's operations then expanded sharply: its loan portfolio grew from 378 billion tenge at the end of 2013 to about 1.45 trillion tenge in 2015, and to 1.73 trillion tenge by 2019.

The bank's largest projects include the modernisation of the three oil refineries in Atyrau, Pavlodar and Shymkent, construction of the Saryarka gas pipeline, gasification of several regions, and the production of the first Kazakh-made railway wheels and rails in Aktobe. As of August 2025, 26 enterprises in industry, energy and infrastructure were under construction with DBK support, with their financing tied to the National Development Plan to 2029. In the first nine months of 2025 the bank financed 31 investment projects and 24 export operations. For 2025, the bank's consolidated net profit fell by 17.2% to 111.4 billion tenge, and it paid more than 55.7 billion tenge in dividends to its sole shareholder.

== Operations ==
The bank does not take deposits from the public and specialises in medium- and long-term financing of large and medium-sized businesses. It lends to investment projects and export operations, provides mezzanine, syndicated and leasing finance, issues guarantees, takes equity stakes in companies and provides funding to commercial banks. Its priority sectors are infrastructure (energy, transport, telecommunications), manufacturing (metallurgy, chemicals and petrochemicals, pharmaceuticals, engineering), food production and agricultural processing, and non-resource exports.

By law, the bank may not distribute its net profit under the usual rules: income goes primarily to building reserves, including reserve capital. Its main source of funding is bonds placed on domestic and international markets, including in US dollars, tenge and Chinese yuan.

Over 25 years the bank has financed 218 investment projects and 151 export operations totalling 19 trillion tenge. Enterprises built with its participation have created more than 34,000 jobs.
