= Architecture of Almaty =

The city of Almaty (Kazakhstan) has notable examples of architecture, particularly from the 19th century period. These include characteristic designs in neo-Russian style from major architects including Andrei Pavlovich Zenkov, Paul Gourdet, and others. Almaty is referred to as “The garden city” on account of its green plantations. During the 19th century, a large number of theatres, museums and apartment houses were built. The city’s apartment houses are called “Khrushchyovka” and “Stalinka” due to the peculiarities of architectural approaches in their construction.

== History ==
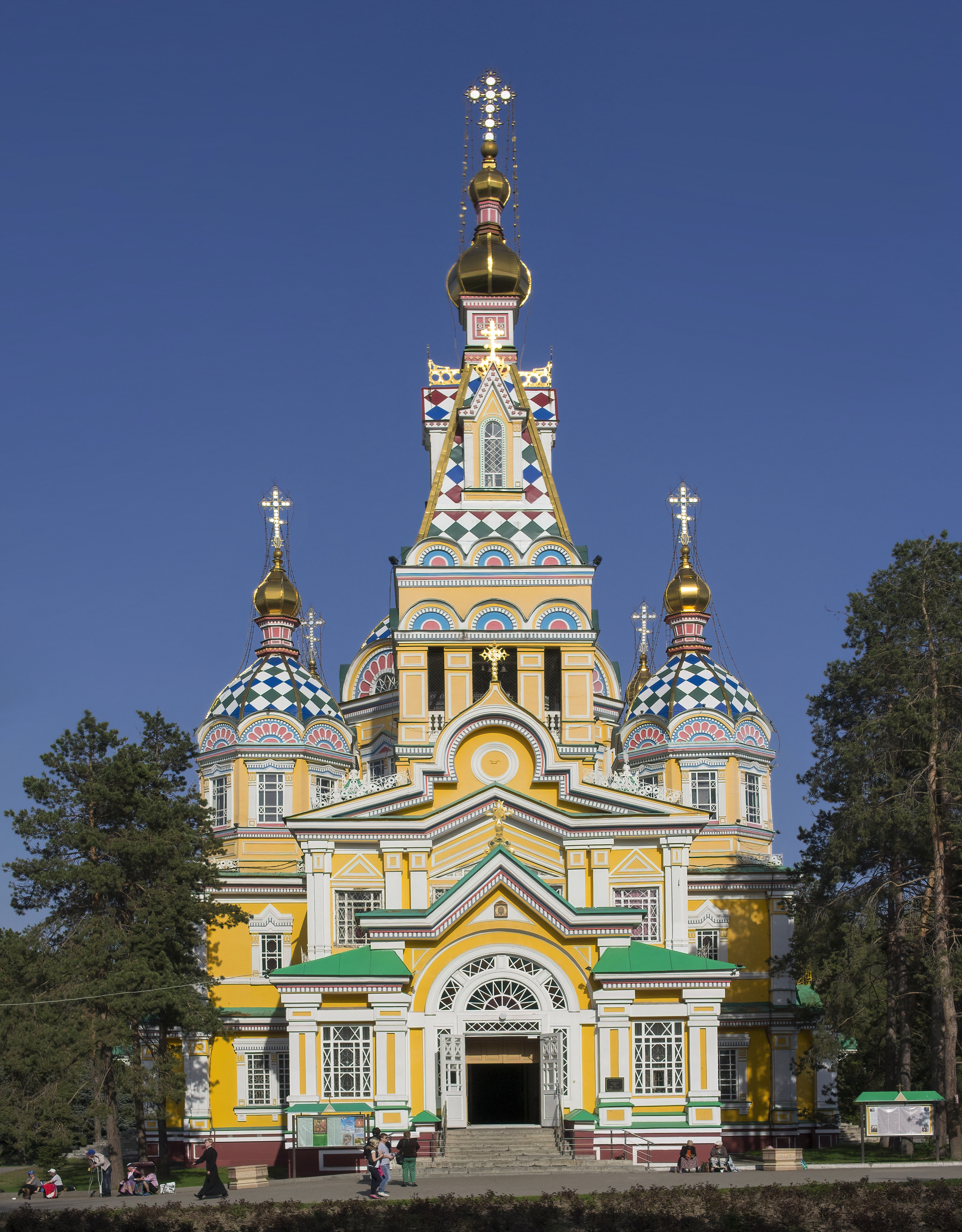
Zenkov Cathedral, a 19th-century Russian Orthodox cathedral located in Panfilov Park, is the fourth tallest wooden building in the world.

In 1854, the Tsarist government built a military fortification on the left bank of the Almaty river. The construction was supervised by Major Peremyshelsky and engineer-lieutenant Aleksandrovsky. By the autumn of the same year, construction work was completed.

From 1855, Russian settlers began to arrive to the city. With their arrival, the area of Almaty began to develop rapidly, and a few prominent buildings were constructed during this time including the Little Stanitsa and the Tatar Slobodka. In 1856, the "State Garden" (now the Central Park of Culture and Rest) was built. In 1857, the first water mill was built in the area of the Tatar Sloboda. Almaty also began to develop industry and crafts, including breweries, and wool factories.

On May 28, 1887 a major earthquake destroyed 1798 brick houses and killed 322 people. After the earthquake, numerous notable buildings were constructed including the House of the Regiment of Military Assembly, the Cathedral, the House of Public Assembly, and others.

In 1896, the Kyzyl-Tan building was commissioned by the Verny merchant Iskhak Gabdulvaliev. The building is currently well known in Kazakhstan. Located on Jibek Joly Street, its structure is made up of lacy wooden cornices, figured columns on pediments, and scaly covering the dome crowned by a small spire. Its construction was concluded in 1912. The building was designed by architect Paul Gourdet, who is credited for most of Almaty’s urban architecture of the time. His approach to architecture involved a “new-Russian” style, which is evident in some of his designs including the Medical College, the Voznesensky Cathedral, the merchant Shakhvorostov's house, the former Women's College, the former City Orphanage, and numerous other buildings.

Andrei Pavlovich Zenkov is another prominent architect and major contributor to some of Almaty’s most notable buildings. He is credited to building Ascension Cathedral, the House of Gabdulvaliev (Tulebayev-Pasteur), the church house (on the north side of the Cathedral). He is also credited for redesigning the Men’s Gymnasium of Verny after it was destroyed by the 1887 earthquake. At the time, Zenkov was in charge of the construction projects of the Semirechye regional government. He developed the building’s wooden extensions. Professor of Architecture VA Nilsen noted that "... their architecture differs from the Tashkent original using stucco facades with a more subtle drawing of details carried out under the guidance of architect Gourde.”

=== The Pugasov Manor ===
The Pugasov Manor in Almaty is located on Kirov and Kalinin Street. In 2000, it became a restaurant under the same name. In 2004, the historic building burned down. In its place, a new building was erected preserving the original Pugasovka layout.

=== French Consulate ===
Almaty’s French Consulate was originally the house of the merchant dynasty of Shahvorostov. It is located on 99 Furmanov Street. The building was previously used as the commissariat of the Turkestan Territory, the Semirechensky sponge of the RCP (b), the medical school, the children's infectious hospital, the hospital, the medical museum and the US Embassy in Kazakhstan.
