= Public department store =

Government-owned retail establishment

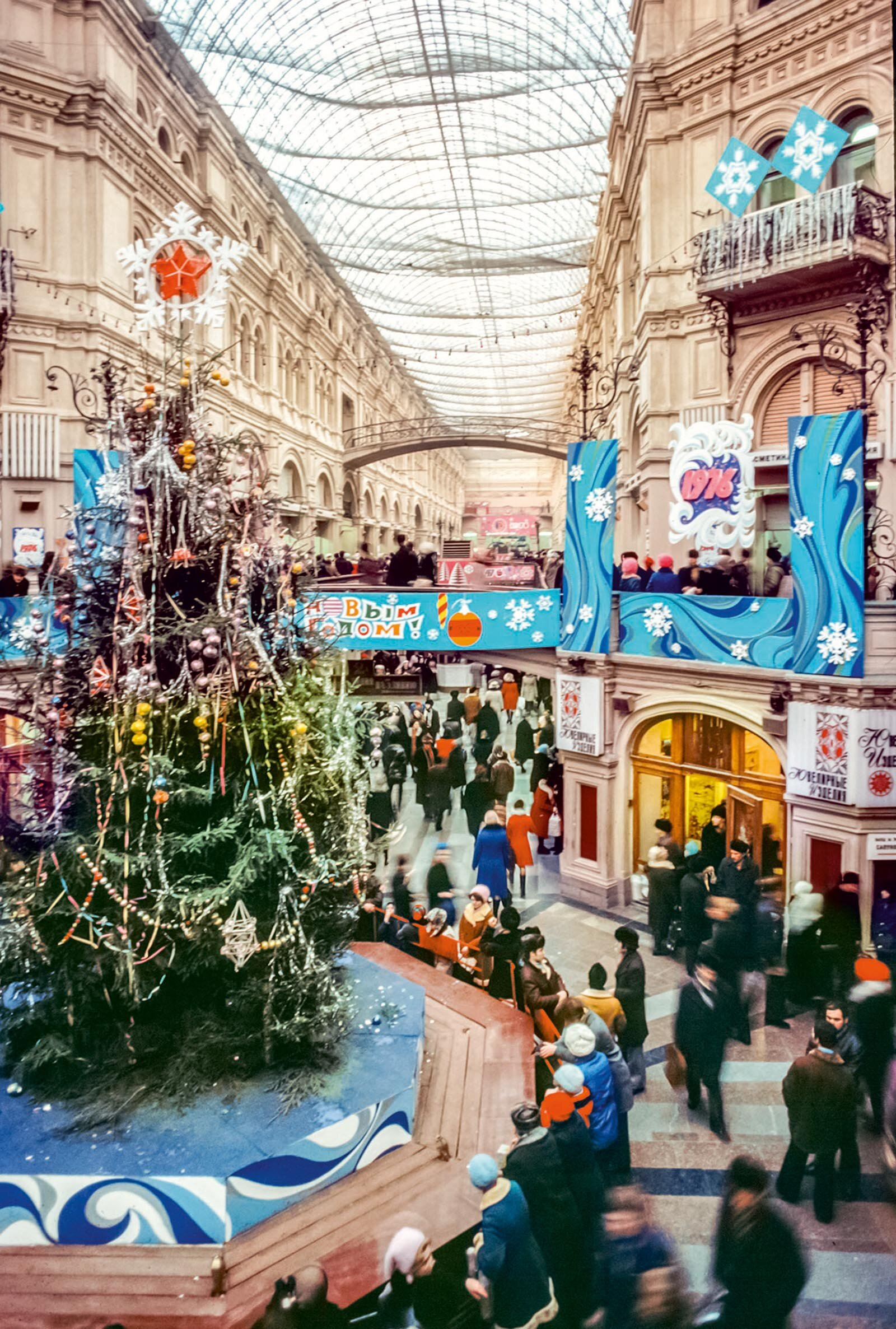
Moscow's GUM, the largest government-owned department store in the Soviet Union, 1975.

Public department stores are department stores that are operated by a government for the benefit of the general public. Because these department stores are publicly owned and run for community benefit rather than solely for profit, the department stores have greater flexibility to lower prices for customers. Public department stores may be owned by national, tribal, or municipal jurisdictions. State-owned department stores have been common in current and historic communist and socialist states, but are also found in states with predominantly capitalist or mixed-market economies. Base exchanges are department stores run by militaries to provide goods to enlistees. Prison commissaries are small-scale markets that provide retail goods to prisoners.

== China ==
For decades, the Chinese government owned and operated department stores. Large scale privatization of department stores began in the late 1990s.

== Czech Republic ==
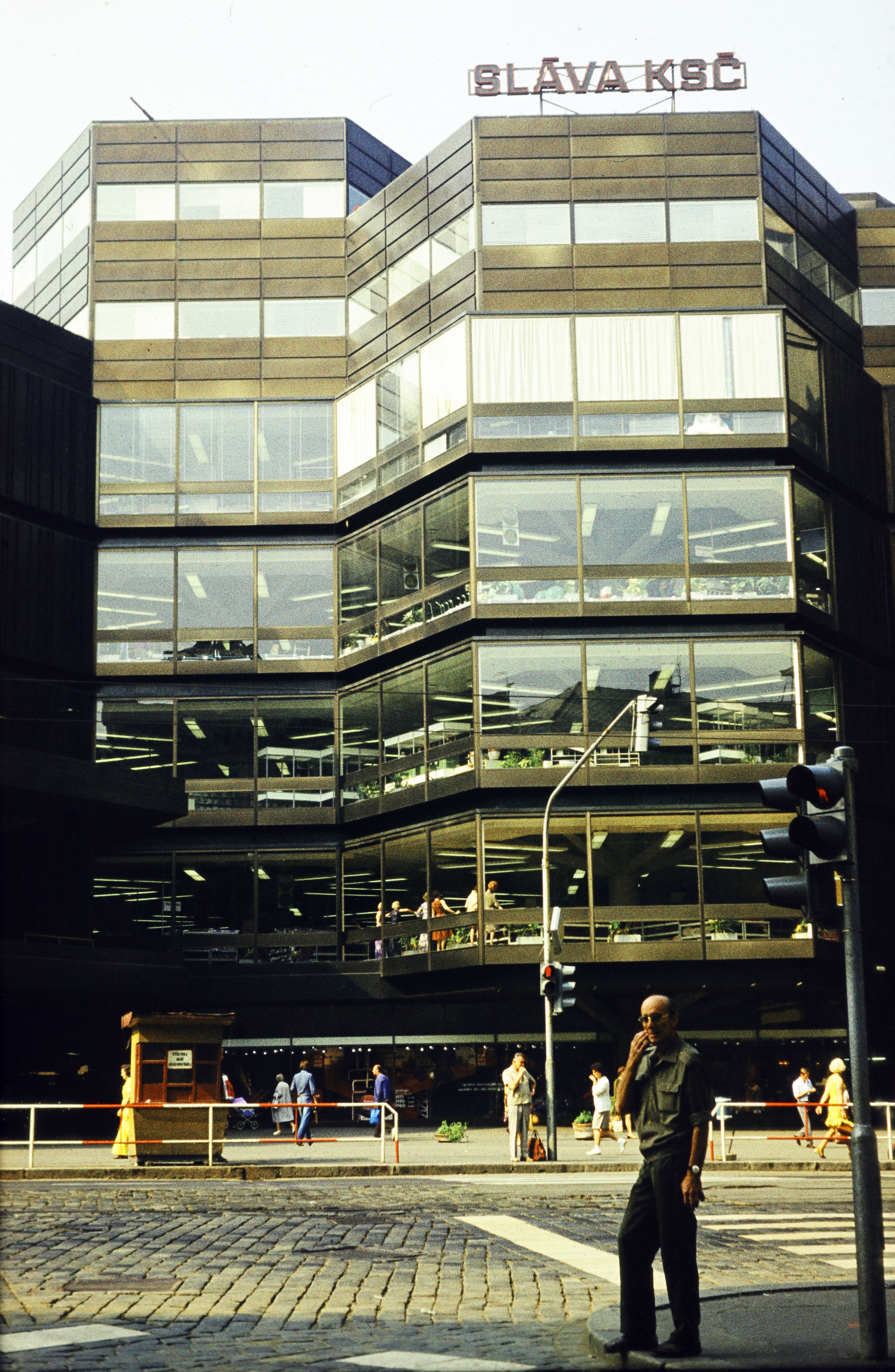
The government-owned Kotva Department Store in Prague, 1974.

In socialist Czechoslovakia, the Prior department store chain was owned by the state. Following the collapse of socialism, the department store chain was privatized in 1992 and sold to Kmart. Prior operated department stores in Hradec Králové, Pardubice, Plzeň, and other Czech cities. Prior's Prague store was called the Kotva Department Store. Kmart operated 6 privatized former Prior department stores in the Czech Republic in the cities of Brno, Hradec Králové, Liberec, Pardubice, Plzeň, and Prague until 1996 when the company was purchased by UK retailer Tesco.

== Egypt ==
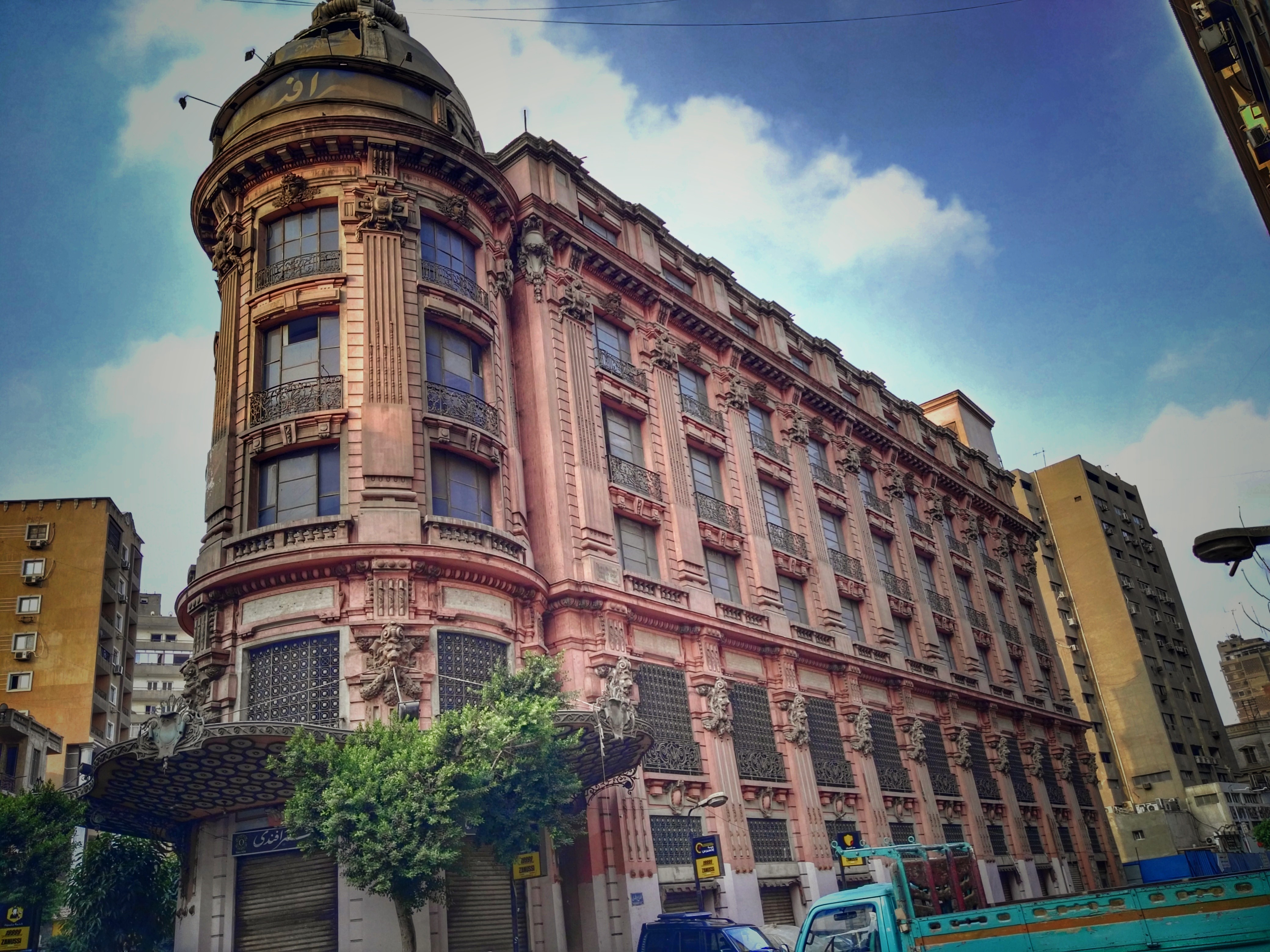
Omar Effendi headquarters in Cairo, Egypt.

The Omar Effendi chain of department stores in Egypt is owned by a branch of the Ministry of Public Business Sector.

== Iran ==
The Shahrvand Chain Stores Inc. department store chain is owned by the city government of Tehran.

== Kazakhstan ==
In Soviet Kazakhstan, there was a state monopoly on retail. Government-owned department stores called TsUMs (central universal department stores) existed in major cities such as Almaty and Astana.

== Mexico ==
Compañía Nacional de Subsistencias Populares, a government-owned food and goods distribution company that was operational between 1962 and 1999, operated a chain of department stores.

== Mongolia ==
In the socialist Mongolian People's Republic, there was a state monopoly on retail. The government-owned State Department Store in Ulaanbaatar was built in 1961 with assistance from the Chinese government. The department store was privatized in 1999.

== North Korea ==
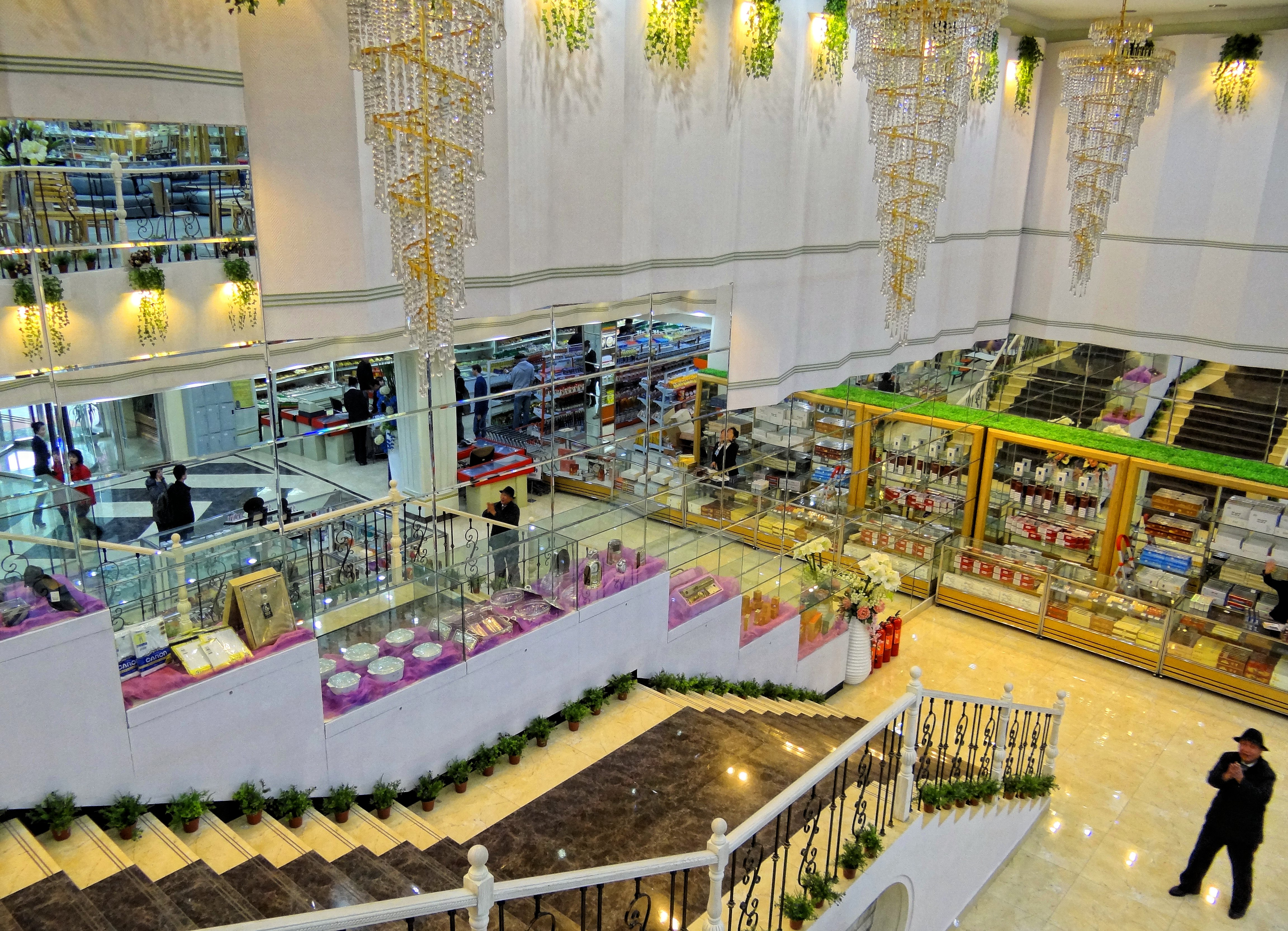
Pyongyang Department Store No. 1, March 2014.

The Pyongyang Department Store No. 1 is one of the largest department stores in North Korea. The state-owned department store is located in Chung-guyok, Pyongyang's Central District.

== Russia ==
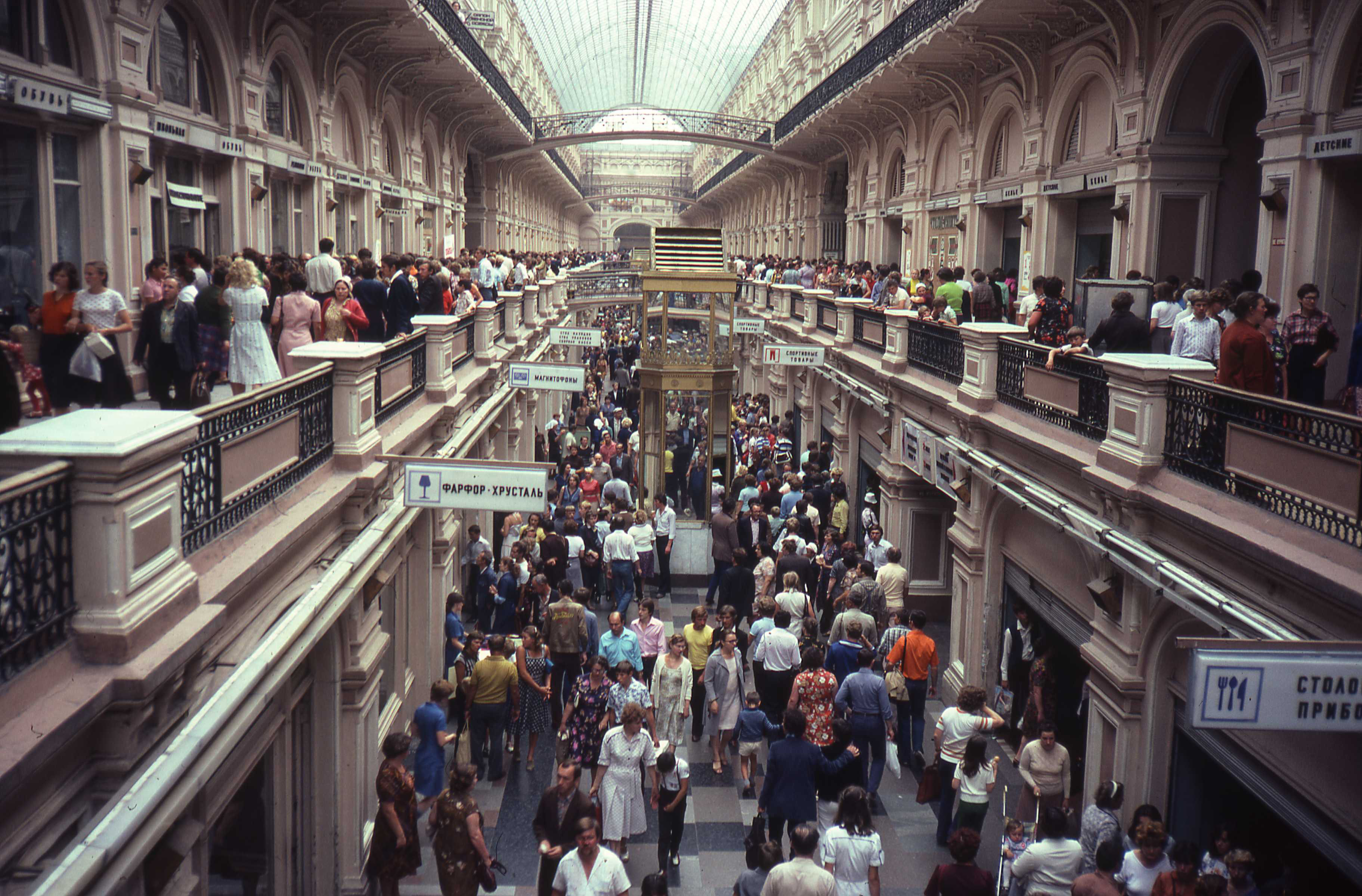
GUM in 1982.

In Soviet Russia, there was a government monopoly on retail, including department stores. The largest government-owned department store in the Soviet Union was Moscow's GUM. Another major government-owned department store was TsUM, which was located across from GUM in Red Square.

== Serbia ==
Due to the state monopoly on retail, department stores were government-owned in the Yugoslavia-era Socialist Republic of Serbia.

Kluz was a popular government-owned department store located on Masarikova Street in Belgrade. Following the collapse of the socialist government, Kluz began to undergo a process of gradual privatization.

== Slovakia ==
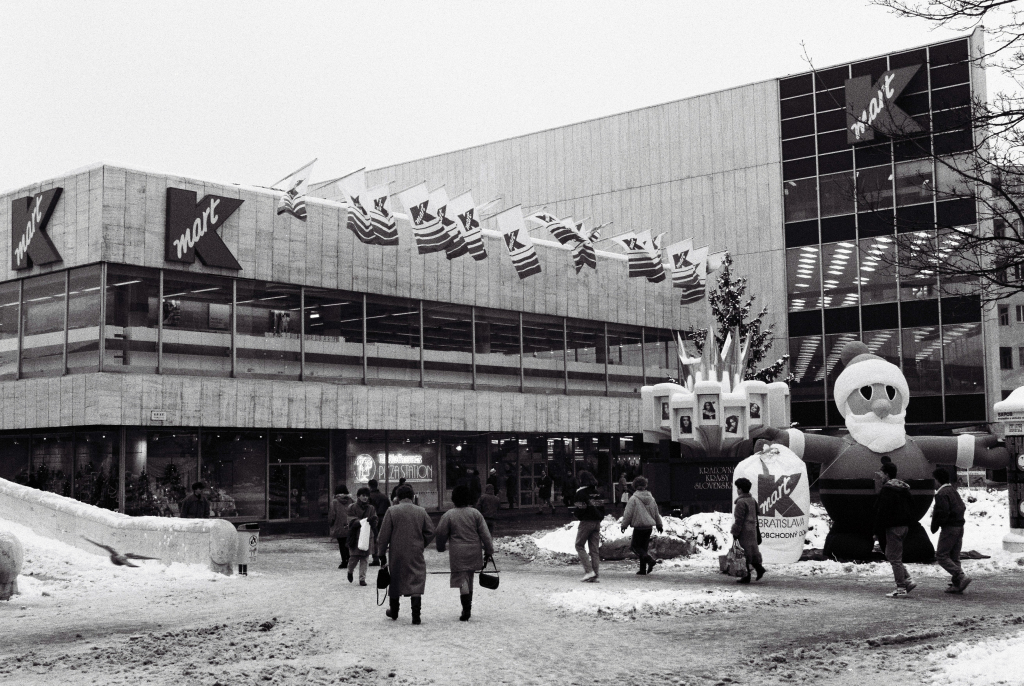
The Kmart in Bratislava located in the former building of the privatized Prior department store, 1990s.

Due to the state monopoly on retail, department stores were government-owned in the Slovak Socialist Republic. The government-owned Prior chain operated department stores in Bratislava, Košice, and other Slovak cities.

== Ukraine ==
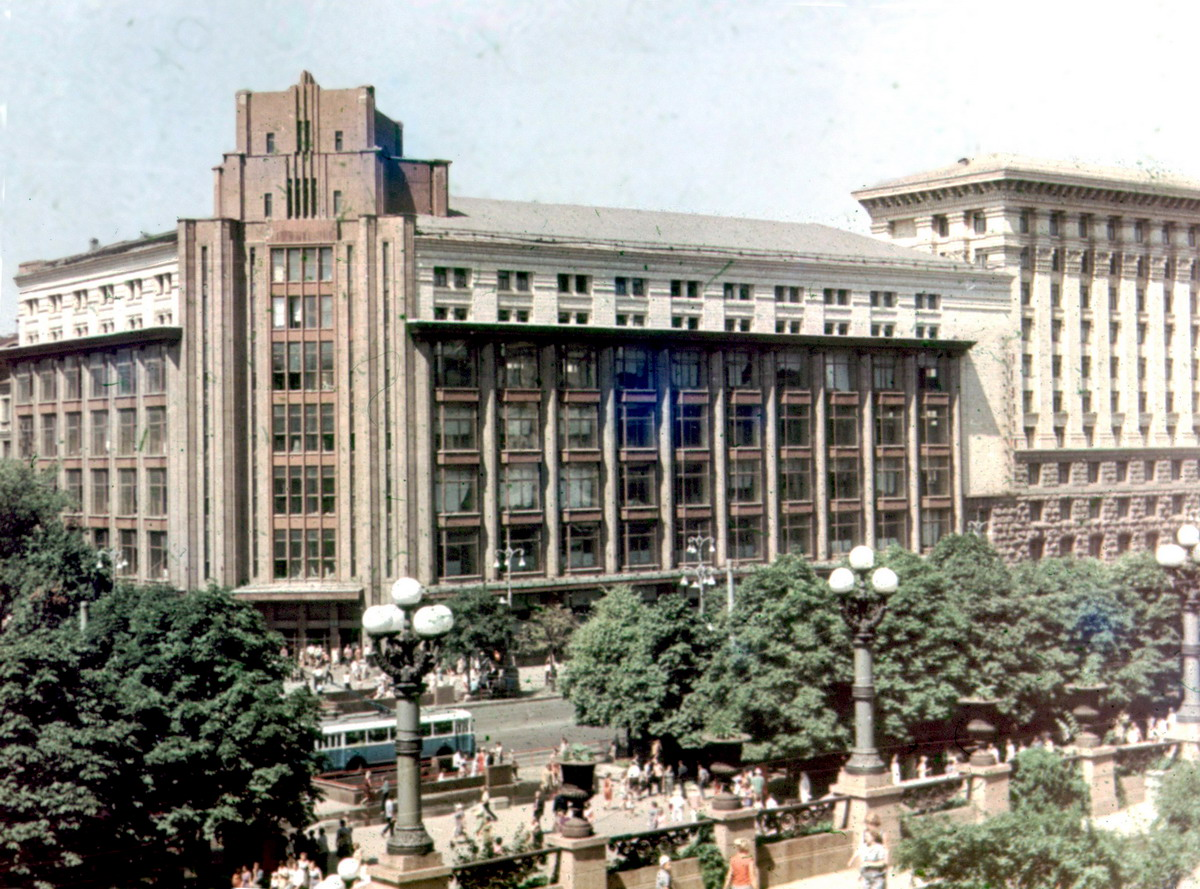
TsUM Kyiv department store in Kyiv, Ukraine, 1974.

Due to the state monopoly on retail during the Soviet era, the TsUM Kyiv department store in the Ukrainian Soviet Socialist Republic was government-owned. Tsum Kyiv was privatized following the collapse of the Soviet Union and the independence of Ukraine.

== United States ==
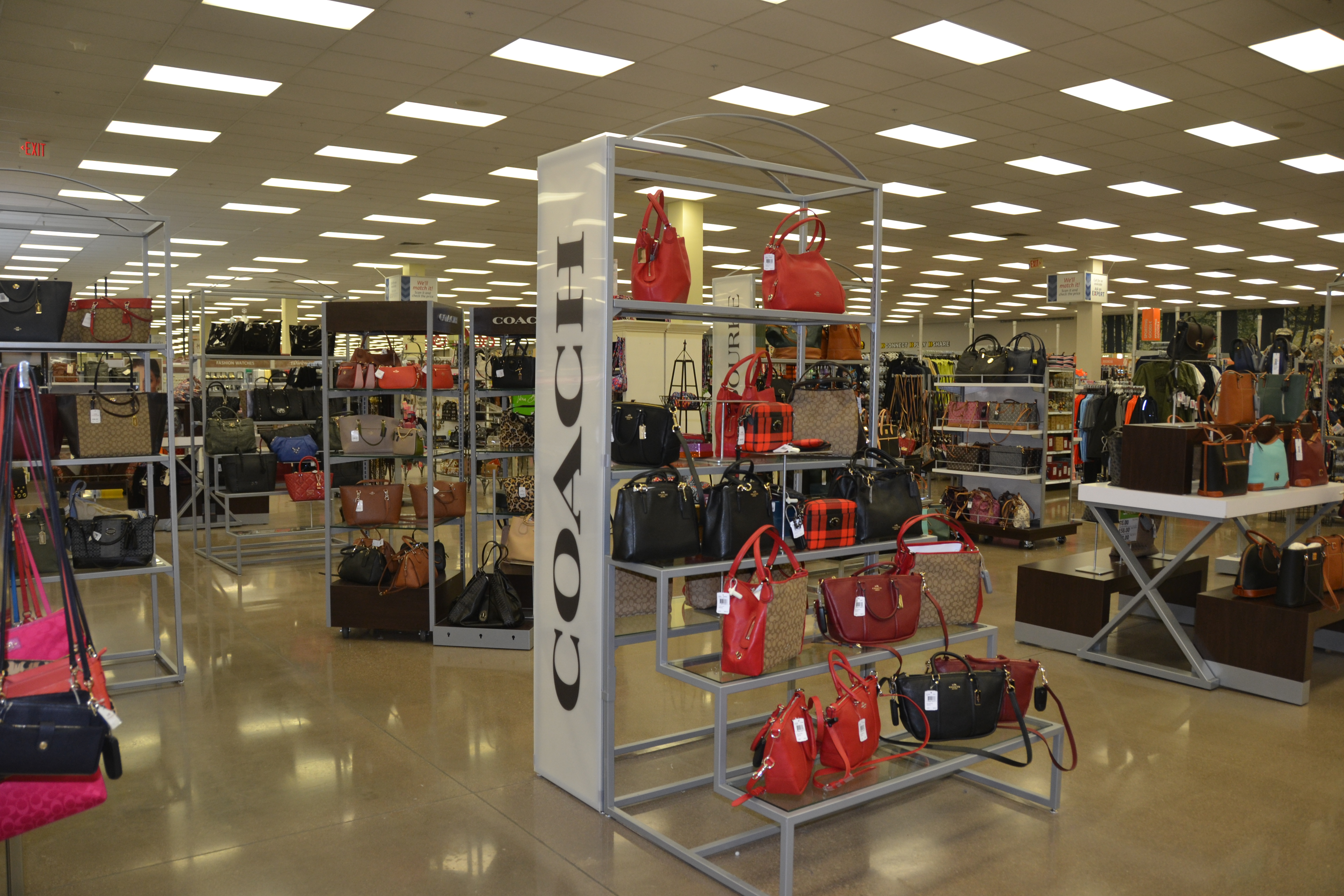
Exchange at the Nellis Air Force Base in Nevada, 2015.

The United States Armed Forces operates base exchanges, which function as the equivalent of department stores and strip malls for members of the military.

Some American Indian tribes own departments stores, such as the Caddo Nation's George's Department Store in Anadarko, Oklahoma.

In 1912, the Socialist Party of America Representative from Wisconsin, Victor L. Berger, introduced a federal bill proposing that government-owned department stores be created in Washington, D.C. for federal employees, along the lines of base exchanges that existed in the Panama Canal Zone for members of the military.

== See also ==
- Alcohol monopoly
- Base exchange
- Consumer goods in the Soviet Union
- GUM (department store)
- Hard currency shops in socialist countries
- Public education
- Public grocery store
- Public housing
- Public transport
- Public utility
- TsUMs in the Soviet Union – central universal department stores
  - Central Department Store (Sofia)
  - TsUM Kyiv
  - TsUM (Almaty)
  - TsUM (Moscow)
