= Commissary store =

Store for provisions

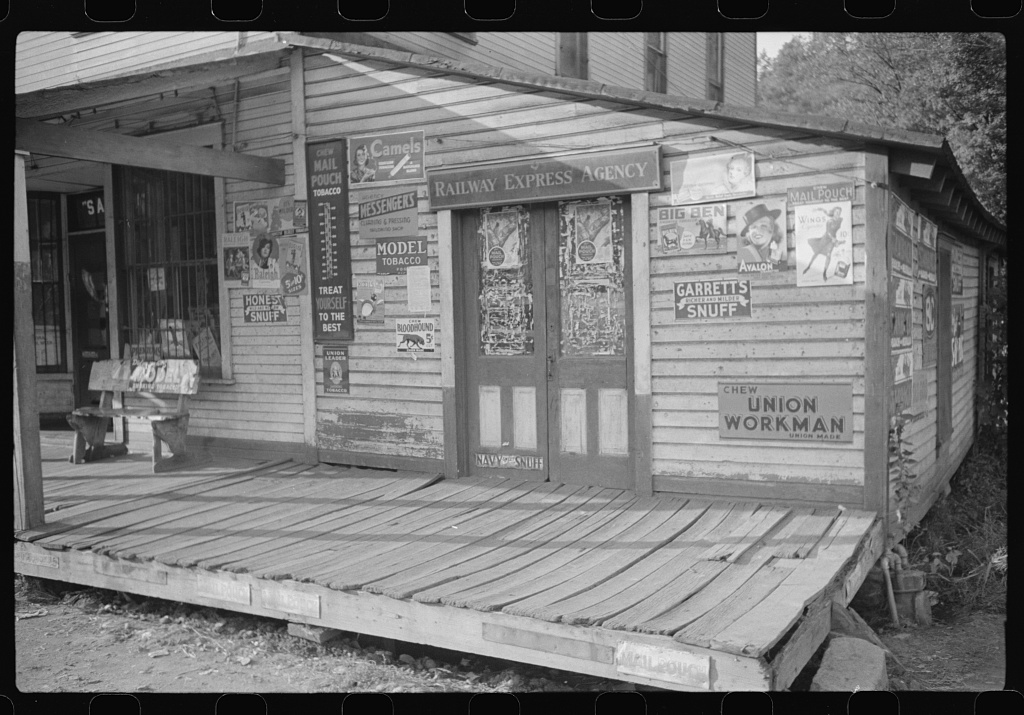
A commissary at the Scotts Run coal mining camp, 1938, near Morgantown, West Virginia

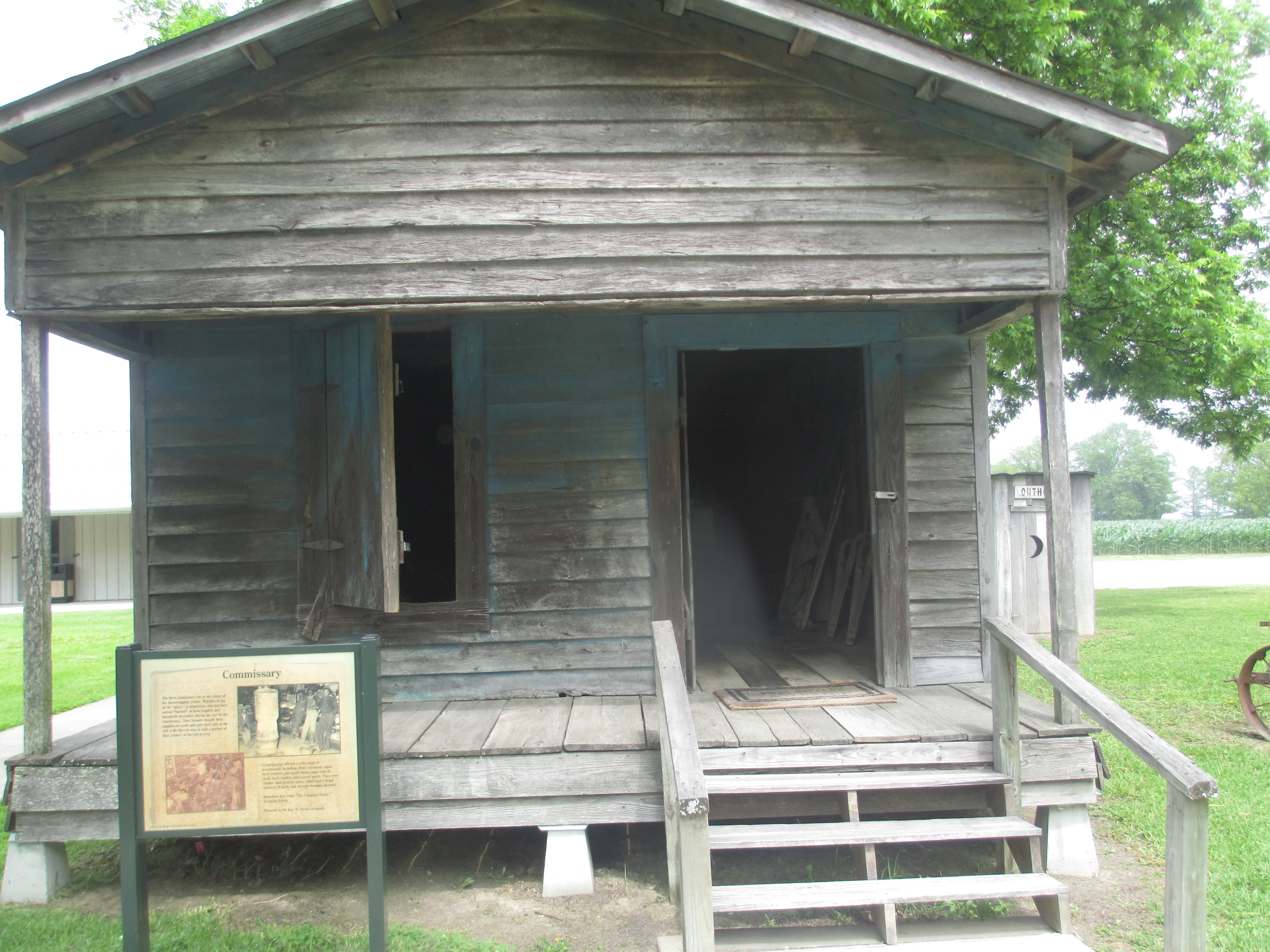
Commissary for sharecroppers, on display at the Louisiana State Cotton Museum

A commissary is a store for provisions which can include prepared foods for eating either on-premises or off-premises. It is usually run within an organization such as a mining operation, steel mill, film studio, corporate center, or government or military unit, and is primarily for the use of employees.

== Eligibility ==
Eligible patrons of United Nations Commissaries include

- diplomatic members of Permanent Mission
- officials of the United Nations Office
- officials of other UN entities
- heads of delegations of UN Member States

Eligible patrons of US Military Commissaries include

- active-duty personnel
- retired service members
- Guard and Reserve personnel
- immediate family members of service personnel
- Purple Heart recipients
- Medal of Honor recipients
- former prisoners of war
- veterans with any service-connected disability
- caregivers registered with the VA's Comprehensive Assistance for Family Caregivers program.

== U.S. military commissary benefits ==
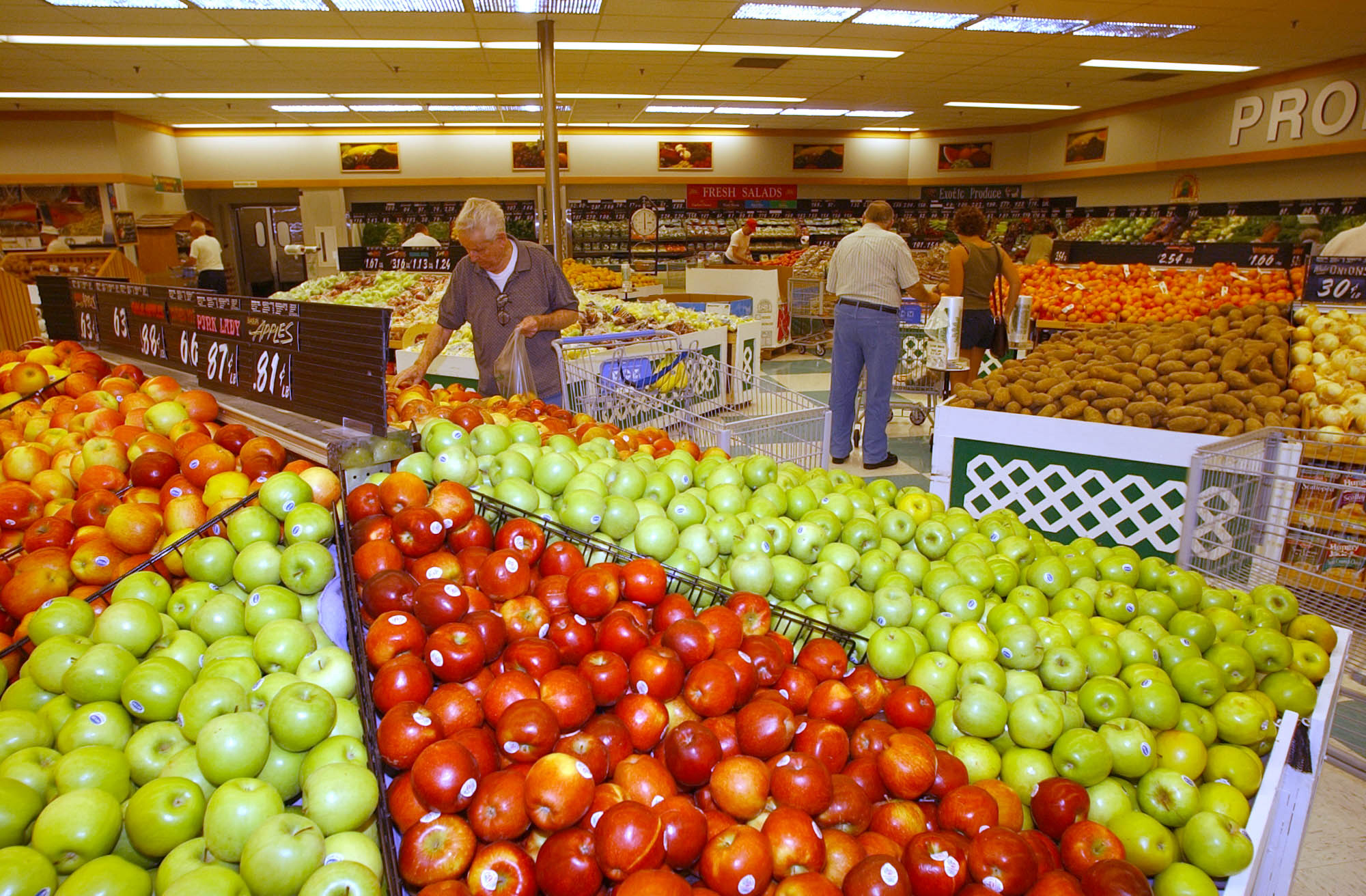
Interior view of the commissary at Naval Station Norfolk, August 2002.

U.S. Military commissaries are run by the Defense Commissary Agency (DeCA). In 2023, DeCA operated 236 commissaries and was appropriated $1.4 billion from the federal budget. Military commissaries serve to provide groceries and household goods, at a reasonable cost, to many members within the Department of Defense regardless of the country in which the service members are posted. A secondary benefit of US military Commissaries is the opportunity for employment of family members. This is especially significant in overseas locations where acquiring a job could prove difficult for U.S. citizens. A U.S. military commissary offers food and household items sold at cost plus five percent surcharge, eliminating sales tax. The average shopper can save more than 30 percent when compared to shopping in town. During the commissary customer appreciation case lot sale, an average saving of 50 percent or more is available. These benefits extend to online shopping as well. They also offer rewards cards that allow shoppers to add additional promotions, coupons, and discount savings. Shoppers can also enter many commissary contests, sweepstakes, and shopping sprees. Commissaries also offer gift cards and contribute to academic scholarships.

== See also ==
- Base exchange
- Company store
- Prison commissary
- Public grocery store
- Sutler
