= Public grocery store =

Government-run store selling food and supplies

Public grocery stores are grocery stores that are operated for the benefit of the general public rather than solely for profit, typically by a local or national government. Public stores may be operated by governments in order to increase price competitiveness in areas lacking access to food, to sell groceries at prices less than the market rate by subsidization (for example targeted at low-income neighborhoods), or as a result of policy to restrict private enterprise. While the term "public grocery store" is most commonly used to mean government-run grocery stores, cooperatives, non-profits, and public-private partnerships are also sometimes referred to as public grocery stores. Government-owned grocery stores may be nationalized, tribally owned, municipality-owned, or owned by other sub-national jurisdictions. State-owned grocery stores have been common in current and historic communist and socialist states, but are also found in states with predominantly capitalist or mixed-market economies. Commissaries are grocery stores run by militaries or prisons to provide goods to enlistees and prisoners. Public grocery stores are also similar to state-owned alcohol stores.

The existence of public grocery stores alongside privately owned grocery stores in the context of a mixed-market economy has been referred to by some advocates as a "public option" for grocery shopping.

== Americas ==
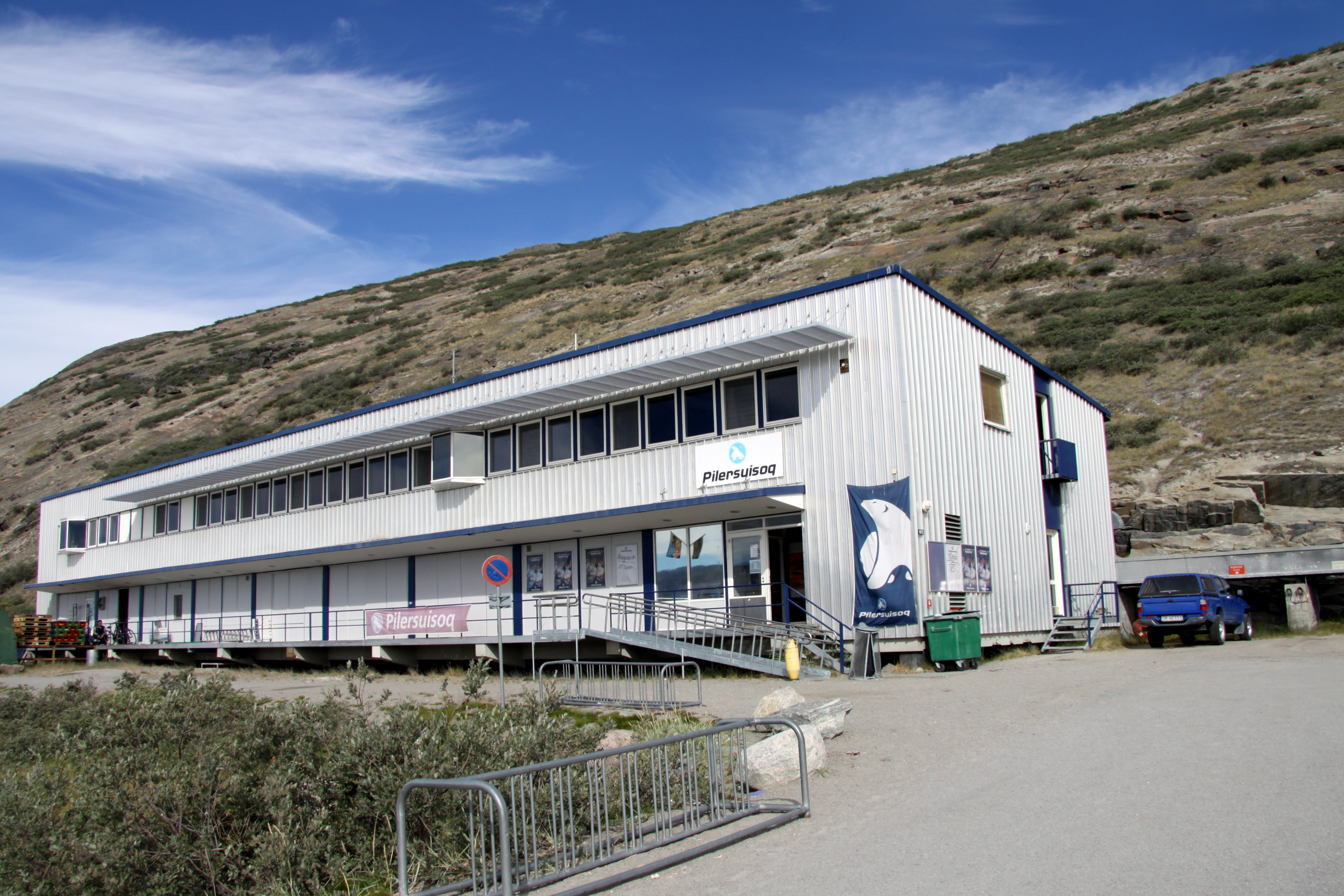
A Pilersuisoq supermarket in Kangerlussuaq, Greenland, July 2010.

- Bolivia – Bolivia's Empresa de Apoyo a la Producción de Alimentos (Emapa, Food Production Support Company), which includes a supermarket chain, is state-owned.
- Cuba – Most grocery stores in Cuba have been state-owned for decades, due to the government monopoly on retail. Since 2021, some small- and medium-size privately owned grocery stores have been allowed to exist, but typically remain unaffordable for the majority of Cubans.
- Greenland – In some remote areas of Greenland, state-owned grocery stores provide food and other commodities imported from Denmark and other countries. Pilersuisoq is KNI's grocery retail store chain.
- Mexico – In 1972, Distribuidora Conasupo (DICONSA, originally Distribuidora e Impulsora Comercial CONASUPO) was created under the state-owned CONASUPO enterprise to distribute basic food items at subsidized prices. In 1994, it was restructured under SEDESOL, and by 1997, it operated over 23,000 stores. In September 2024, President Claudia Sheinbaum announced that in January 2025, the program would be merged with Seguridad Alimentaria Mexicana (SEGALMEX) to create "Tiendas de Bienestar para la Felicidad" (transl. Well-being Stores for Happiness). The program plans to open 30,000 locations by 2030.

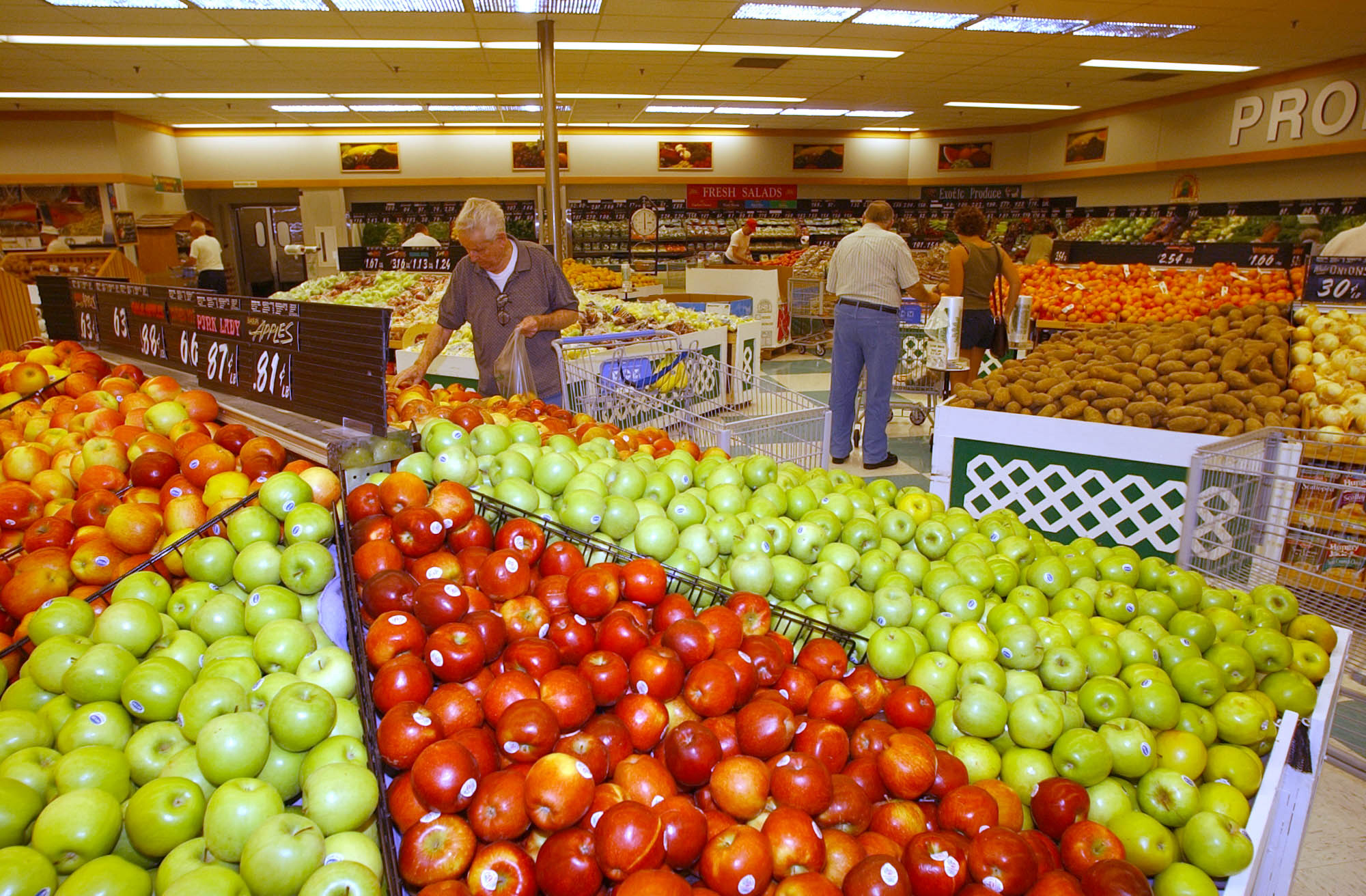
Interior view of the commissary at Naval Station Norfolk, August 2002.

- United States – The United States Department of Defense offers access to grocery and retail stores across the world as benefit to military members. Commissaries are operated by the Defense Commissary Agency and offer subsidized groceries and household goods, while exchanges are operated separately by each branch of the United States Armed Forces and sell goods for profit, sometimes operating mini-marts. In alcoholic beverage control states, liquor stores are owned by the state government. During the 21st century, several cities in the United States have operated or have plans to open city-owned grocery stores, including cities in Florida, Illinois, Kansas, and Wisconsin. Many stores that have received subsidies have closed within a few years or failed to open. Some federally recognized American Indian tribes operate their own grocery stores. The Citizen Potawatomi Nation and the Choctaw Nation own tribal grocery stores in Oklahoma. The Citizen Potawatomi Nation's FireLake Foods in Shawnee, Oklahoma, is the largest tribal grocery store in the United States. In the 21st century, some food infrastructure advocates have supported the establishment of grocery stores through public–private partnerships to address negative effects associated with food deserts.
  - Florida – Baldwin Market in Baldwin, Florida was owned and operated by the city. The grocery store was purchased by the city in 2019 and operated until March 2024, when it closed.
  - Georgia – The city of Atlanta, in partnership with local supermarket chain Savi Provisions, opened Azalea Fresh Market in September 2025. The store is intended to address food insecurity in a food desert in Downtown Atlanta. The city contributed $3.5 million of the project's $5.4 million.
  - Illinois – Launched in 2012, the Illinois Fresh Food Fund supported the opening of six grocery stores in food deserts. As of 2024, four of them had closed. In 2023, Rise Community Market opened in Cairo, Illinois. In 2024, ProPublica reported on the store's financial struggles, citing that in the first half of the year, it averaged less than half its required sales to break even. In 2023, Chicago Mayor Brandon Johnson announced that Chicago would explore the possibility of a city-owned grocery store. The following year, a feasibility study conducted for the city described the municipal grocery store model as "necessary, feasible and implementable." In 2025, city officials announced that they did not apply for state funding for the municipal grocery store, and instead plan to open multiple city-run markets throughout the city. In January 2024, the Grocery Initiative Act came into effect. It authorized the Illinois Grocery Initiative, which aims to address inadequate access to fresh foods, particularly in food deserts, through grants to establish new grocery stores in food deserts and grants to upgrade equipment in existing stores. In 2025, the city of Venice, Illinois received a $2.4 million state grant from the initiative to build a grocery store. The city plans to own the building and lease it to private investors.
  - Kansas – In Kansas, several grocery stores are community-supported, municipality-owned, or city-run. In rural Kansas, local governments and communities had stepped in to own and operate grocery stores as private owners have retired. St. Paul Supermarket in St. Paul, is a municipality-owned business. In May 2020, during the COVID-19 pandemic, the city of Erie bought the Stub's Market grocery store in order to prevent the store from closing. The store was renamed to Erie Market. In September 2024, citing high costs of running the store, the city announced that Erie Market would be leased to River Grocery LLC, which would take over operations and management.
  - New York – During the Great Depression, New York City mayor Fiorello La Guardia established a network of public indoor markets. As of 2025, six of these markets operate under the city's economic development corporation. During his 2025 campaign for Mayor of New York City, Zohran Mamdani proposed a pilot program to create one city-owned grocery store in each of the five boroughs in New York City. The proposal involved redirecting funds from the Food Retail Expansion to Support Health (FRESH) program. Mamdani claimed that FRESH spends $140 million and that the city-owned grocery stores would take less than half of that, though a 2024 report by the office of the New York City Comptroller stated the program had only given around $30 million in tax breaks since inception and had an average yearly cost of $3.3 million. Criticism of the proposal also came from private business owners, including bodega owners. The organization United Bodegas of America and John Catsimatidis, a billionaire owner of a supermarket chain, have criticized public grocery stores as harmful to private businesses and their workers. In 2026, Mayor Mamdani announced the allocation of $70 million to develop the five pilot stores along with the first two locations of the pilot: one in East Harlem in La Marqueta, one of the six city-owned markets, and one in Hunts Point, Bronx.
  - Washington – During the 2025 Seattle mayoral election, incumbent mayor Bruce Harrell and Katie Wilson, the eventual winner, proposed that the city provide land for grocery stores as a means to address food deserts. At the state level, during the 2026 legislative session, State Representative Darya Farivar introduced House Bill 2313. It would allow cities to use eminent domain to acquire property for public grocery stores in underserved areas and to raise funds through capital grants and tax increment financing. The bill did not advance from committee.
  - Wisconsin – Madison, Wisconsin has plans to open its first city-owned grocery store in a food desert on Madison's South Side, operated by Maurer's Urban Market. Originally scheduled to open by the end of 2023, construction on the store began in February 2026.
- Venezuela – During the administration of Hugo Chávez, many supermarkets were nationalized in 2010. These supermarkets were among his administration's more popular policies. Poor and low-income shoppers were more likely to frequent government-owned supermarkets, while wealthier shoppers more often frequented privately owned supermarkets. When oil prices collapsed during the administration of Chávez's successor Nicolás Maduro, state-owned supermarkets struggled to import food during the economic crisis. The Bicentenario supermarket chain in Venezuela was formerly owned by the state. Nationalized under the administration of Hugo Chávez, the chain was later reprivatized.

== Asia ==
- Iran – The discount supermarket and department store chain Shahrvand Chain Stores Inc. is owned by the city government of Tehran.
- Sri Lanka – Sri Lanka has a government-owned supermarket chain known as Lanka Sathosa. As of 2015, it was Sri Lanka's only state-owned supermarket chain.
- Vietnam – Vietnam's socialist government maintains state-owned supermarkets. As of 2023, Co.op Mart, a supermarket brand under the state-run cooperative Saigon Co.op, had the most locations among supermarket brands in the country.
- Indonesia – Koperasi Desa/Kelurahan Merah Putih (lit. The Red-and-White Village/Subdistrict Cooperative) is a state-initiated cooperative program. The program launched in 2025 under President Prabowo Subianto. As of mid-2025, there are already 80.000 Kopdes/Kopkel units opened nationwide.

== Europe ==
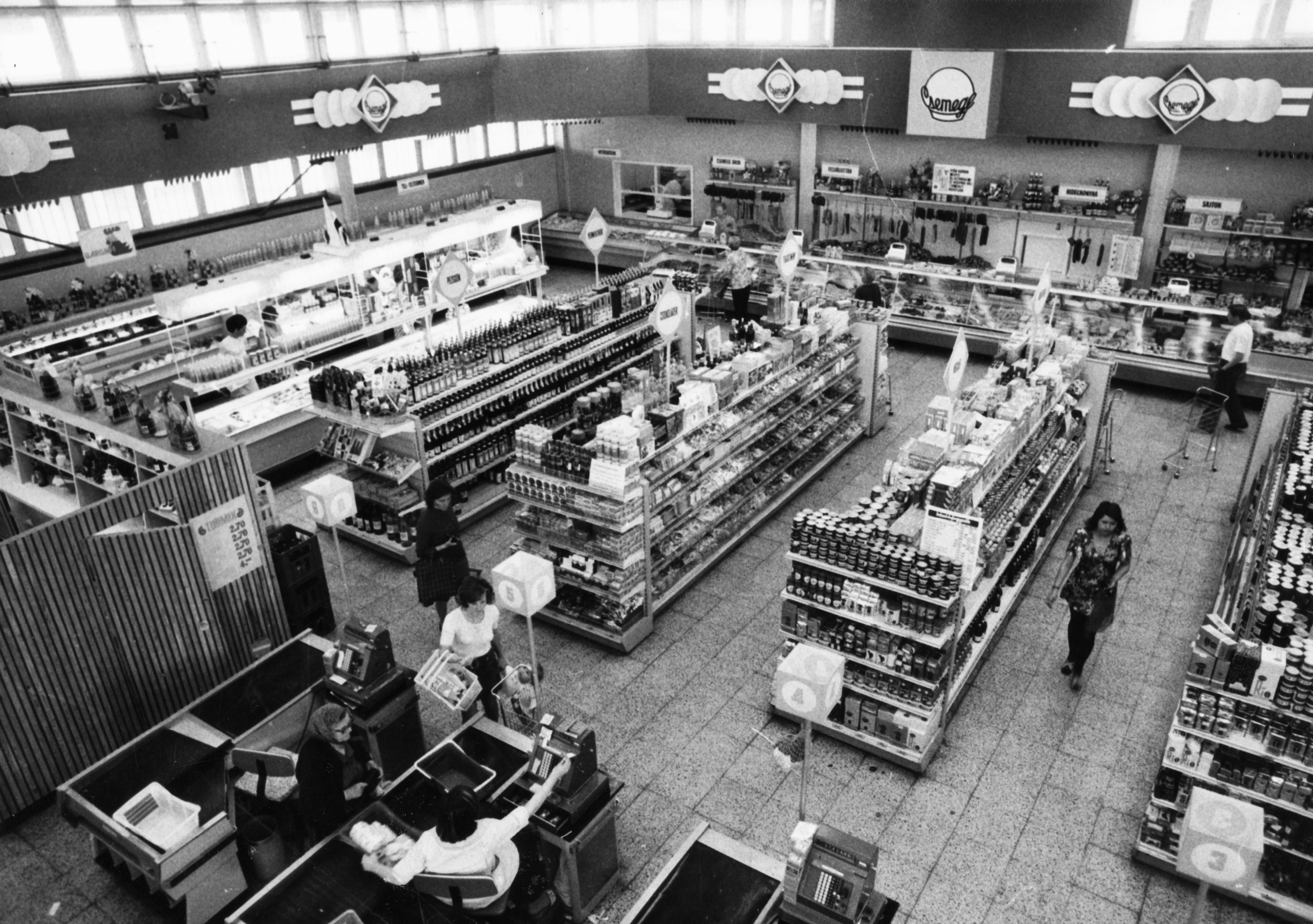
A Csemege supermarket in Hungary, 1976.

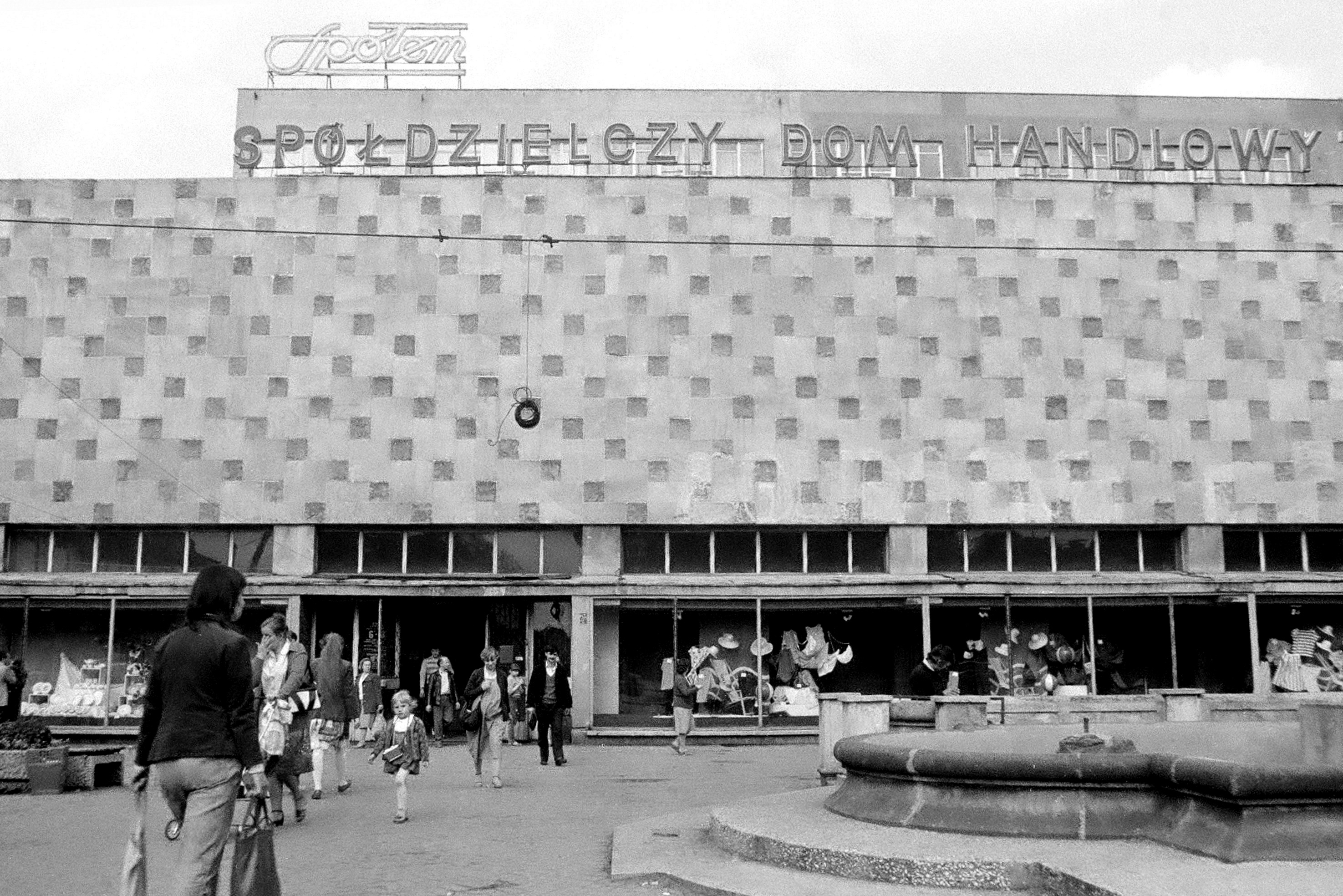
Społem grocery store in Gorzów Wielkopolski, Poland, 1985.

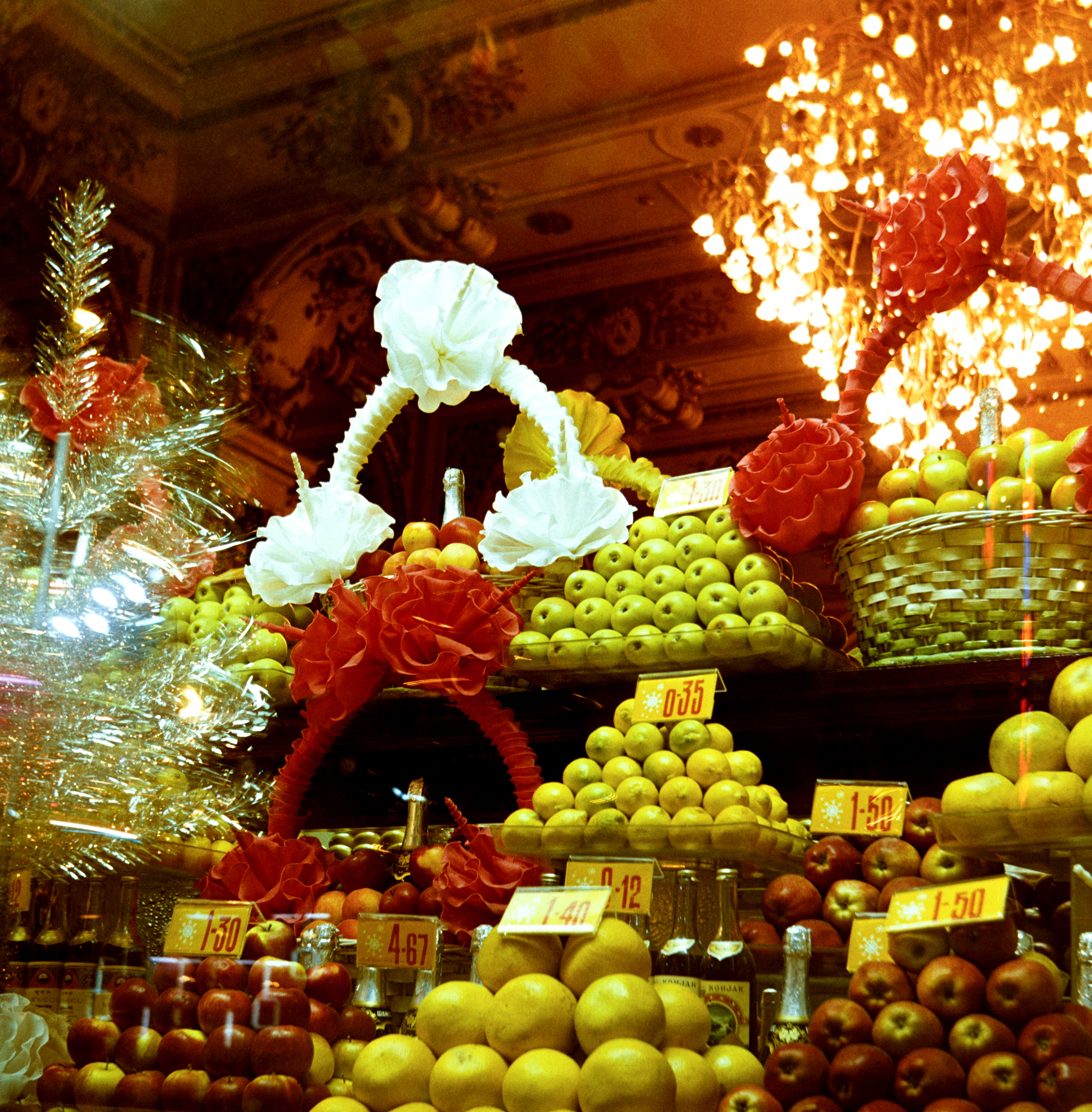
Eliseyevsky grocery store in Moscow, December 1975.

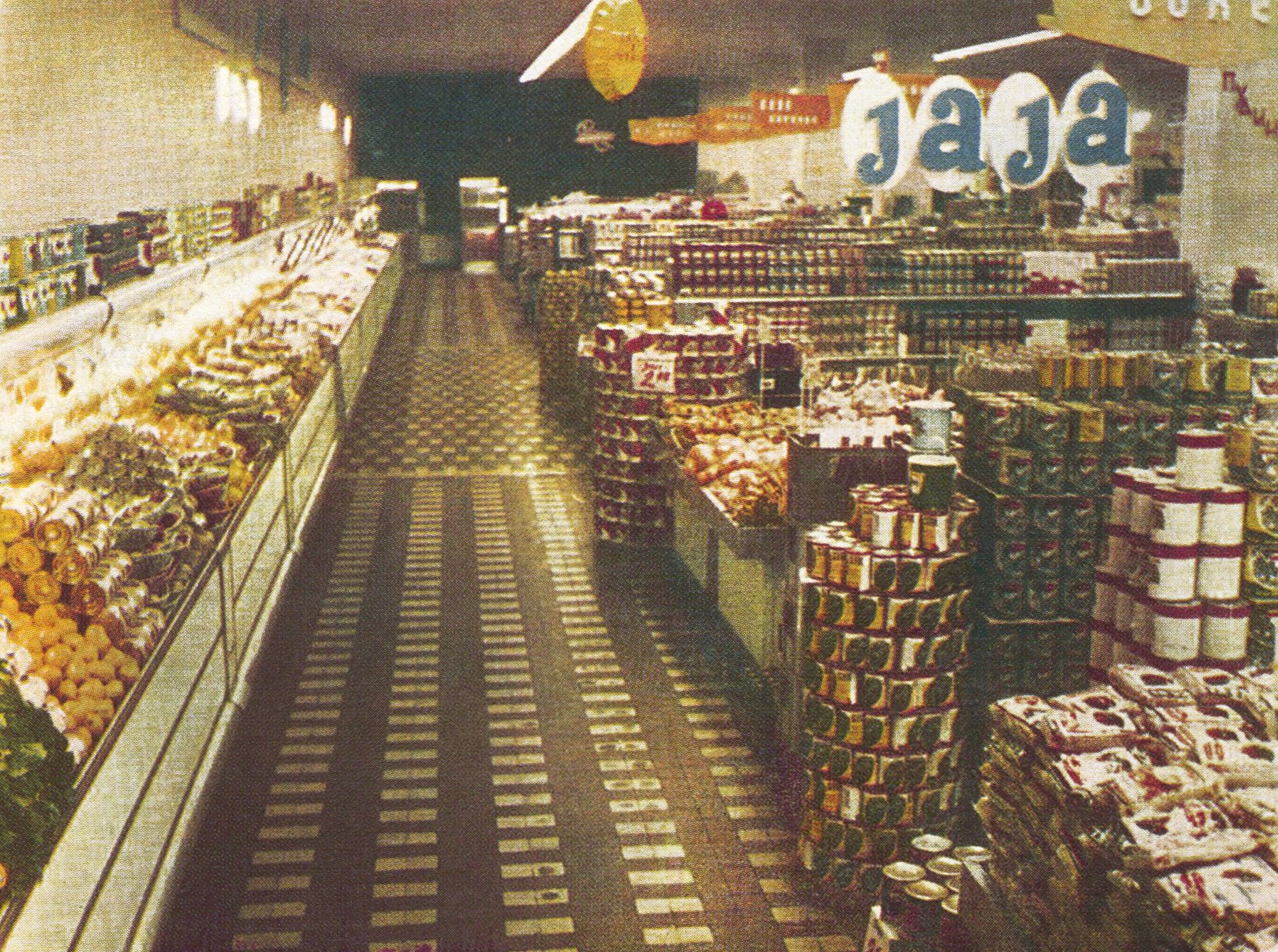
A C-market store in Belgrade, 1968.

- Belarus – According to a 2005 United Nations Commission on Human Rights report, state-owned supermarkets in Belarus engaged in censorship by refusing to sell independent newspapers.
- Bulgaria – Due to the state monopoly over large retail outlets in the socialist People's Republic of Bulgaria, only small food retail businesses were permitted, such as stalls or kiosks. In 2025, the Bulgarian government announced that it would be opening a chain of state-owned supermarkets.
- Czechoslovakia –Due to the state monopoly on retail, all grocery stores were government-owned in socialist Czechoslovakia and consolidated together under a single grocery store network called Zdroj. Zdroj owned grocery stores, greengrocers, and butcher shops across Czechia and Slovakia. The basis of Zdroj was a grocery store chain privately owned by Julius Meinl, Jedlo Bratislava, and Lahôdky Lamplota that was nationalized in 1948. Following the collapse of socialism, Zdroj was broken up into several regional chains and privatized. Aside from Zdroj, Czechoslovakia also had a network of consumer cooperatives called Jednota that sold food products.
- Hungary – A state monopoly over the retail industry was instituted in the socialist Hungarian People's Republic, beginning in the 1940s. The state-owned Csemege grocery chain was established in 1952. In 1992, following the collapse of the socialist government, Csemege was privatized and sold to the Austrian retail company Julius Meinl. Csemege-Julius Meinl was later purchased by the Belgian Louis Delhaize Group and incorporated into the supermarket chain Match. Julius Meinl also purchased the privatized Közért supermarket chain. The state-owned Duna Fuszert Rt supermarket chain was privatized in 1989 when it was sold to the Belgian privately owned corporation Louis Delhaize Group. In 1991, the group purchased several more privatized small grocery stores and renamed them Profi. In 1992, the CBA supermarket chain was formed by 10 businessmen who purchased 17 privatized grocery stores. In 1995, private grocery retailer Tesco acquired the state-owned supermarket chain Global. At the time, Global had over 40 locations.
- Poland – Due to the nationalization of retail in the socialist Polish People's Republic, many Polish grocery stores were state-owned. Społem, a consumers' co-operative of local grocery stores, also became controlled by the state during this time. In 2020, the Polish government considered opening a government-owned grocery store chain to help farmers.
- Romania – State-owned grocery stores were once common in the Socialist Republic of Romania. The state monopoly on retail ended after the collapse of Communism in 1989. In 2020, the Romanian government considered opening a state-owned retail chain called Unirea (The Union). The Romanian Ministry of Agriculture also announced the creation of a state-owned "agro food commerce" company to help Romanian small farmers and promote Romanian-made goods.
- Russia – In the Soviet Union, the government nationalized the retail industry after the Russian Revolution. Following the collapse of the Soviet Union, much of the retail sector was privatized. The Eliseyevsky grocery store in Moscow was state-owned during the Soviet era. The store was privatized in the early 1990s.
- Yugoslavia – A state monopoly over retail was instituted in Yugoslavia in the 1940s, including government ownership of retail shops. By 1946, 90% of the retail industry had been nationalised. The C-market supermarket chain was state-owned in Yugoslavia and Serbia and Montenegro. The first Serbian supermarket was a C-market opened in Belgrade in 1958.
- Slovenia – Slovenia is a former Yugoslav republic. As such, its economy was largely state-owned prior to the dissolution of the federation. The state still owns many enterprises, such as the banks, which in turn own businesses such as supermarkets and newspapers.
- Spain – In 2023, in response to rising grocery store prices, the Spanish left-wing political party Podemos has proposed the creation of government-owned supermarkets with reduced prices.

== Oceania ==
- New Zealand – There are no state-owned grocery stores in New Zealand. State-owned supermarkets have been debated as a possible answer to New Zealand's "supermarket duopoly", but no proposal has been enacted.

During the 2026 New Zealand general election, The Greens party have proposed forcing Foodstuffs and Woolworths to sell 120 stores and two distribution centres to create a third government-owned supermarket chain.

== See also ==
- Alcoholic beverage control state
- Alcohol monopoly
- Commissary (store)
- Consumer goods in the Soviet Union
- Food bank
- GUM (department store)
- Hard currency shops in socialist countries
- Public department store
- Public education
- Public housing
- Public transport
- Public utility
- TsUMs in the Soviet Union – central universal department stores
  - Central Department Store (Sofia)
  - TsUM Kyiv
  - TsUM (Almaty)
  - TsUM (Moscow)
