= Arbat (Almaty) =

Pedestrian zone in Almaty, Kazakhstan

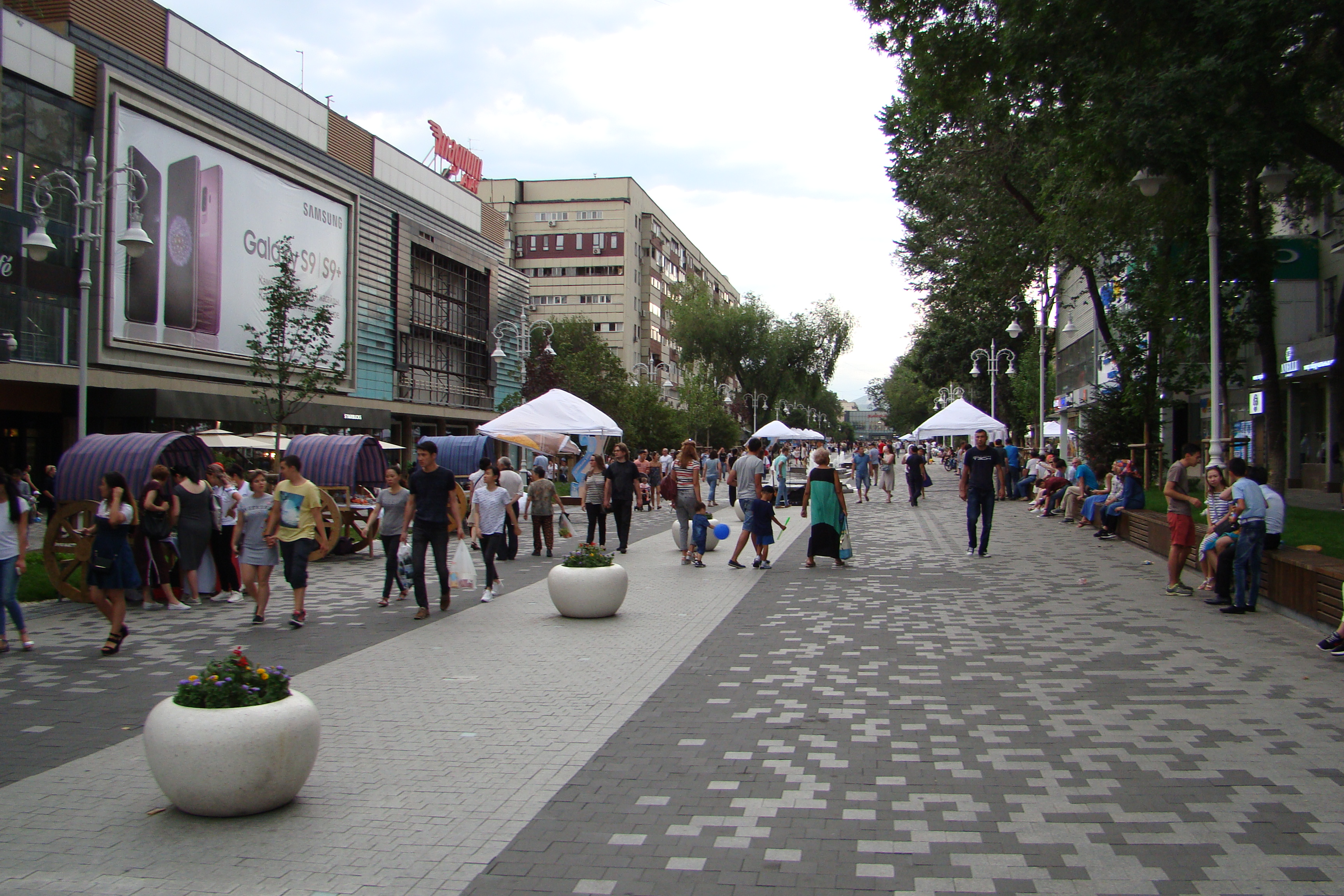
- Interactive map of Arbat
- Native name: Арбат (Russian)
- Length: 0.42 mi (0.68 km)
- Location: Almaty, Kazakhstan

The Arbat is a pedestrian zone in Almaty, Kazakhstan, located on Jibek Joly Street, between Abylai Khan Avenue and Nazarbayev Street. The area features, the TsUM department store, the Silk Way shopping mall, and many kiosks.

== History ==
Created in the late 1980s, the Arbat was the first pedestrian zone in Almaty. The name is taken from Moscow's Arbat Street. The area was reconstructed in 2017 and now features fountains. It is connected to the Panfilov Street Promenade. A plan to extend the pedestrian area to Seyfullin Prospect was announced in 2018.
