= Pothonggang Department Store =

Department store in Pyongyang, North Korea

- Formation: December 2010; 15 years ago
- Purpose: Retail sale of goods
- Location: Pyongyang, North Korea

- Pothonggang Department Store
- Chosŏn'gŭl: 보통강백화점
- Hancha: 普通江百貨店
- Revised Romanization: Botonggangbaekwajeom
- McCune–Reischauer: Pot'onggangbaek'wajŏm

The Pothonggang Department Store (Korean: 보통강백화점) is a department store in Pyongyang, North Korea. It is located near the Pothong River ("Pothonggang" in Korean).

The Pothonggang Department Store was officially opened by Kim Jong Il in December 2010. It was reported by Forbes in 2011 that the shelves in this three-storey store were completely stocked with imported goods. Items were priced in North Korean won and included Mars bars, Heinz ketchup, high-end spirits and cigarettes, mostly imported from Asia and Europe. Apparel and shoes were available on another floor. Inexpensive Chinese clothes and furniture are also on sale.

== See also ==
- Pyongyang Department Store No. 1
