= Kyzyl-Tan (Almaty) =

Coordinates: 43°15′45″N 76°57′00″E

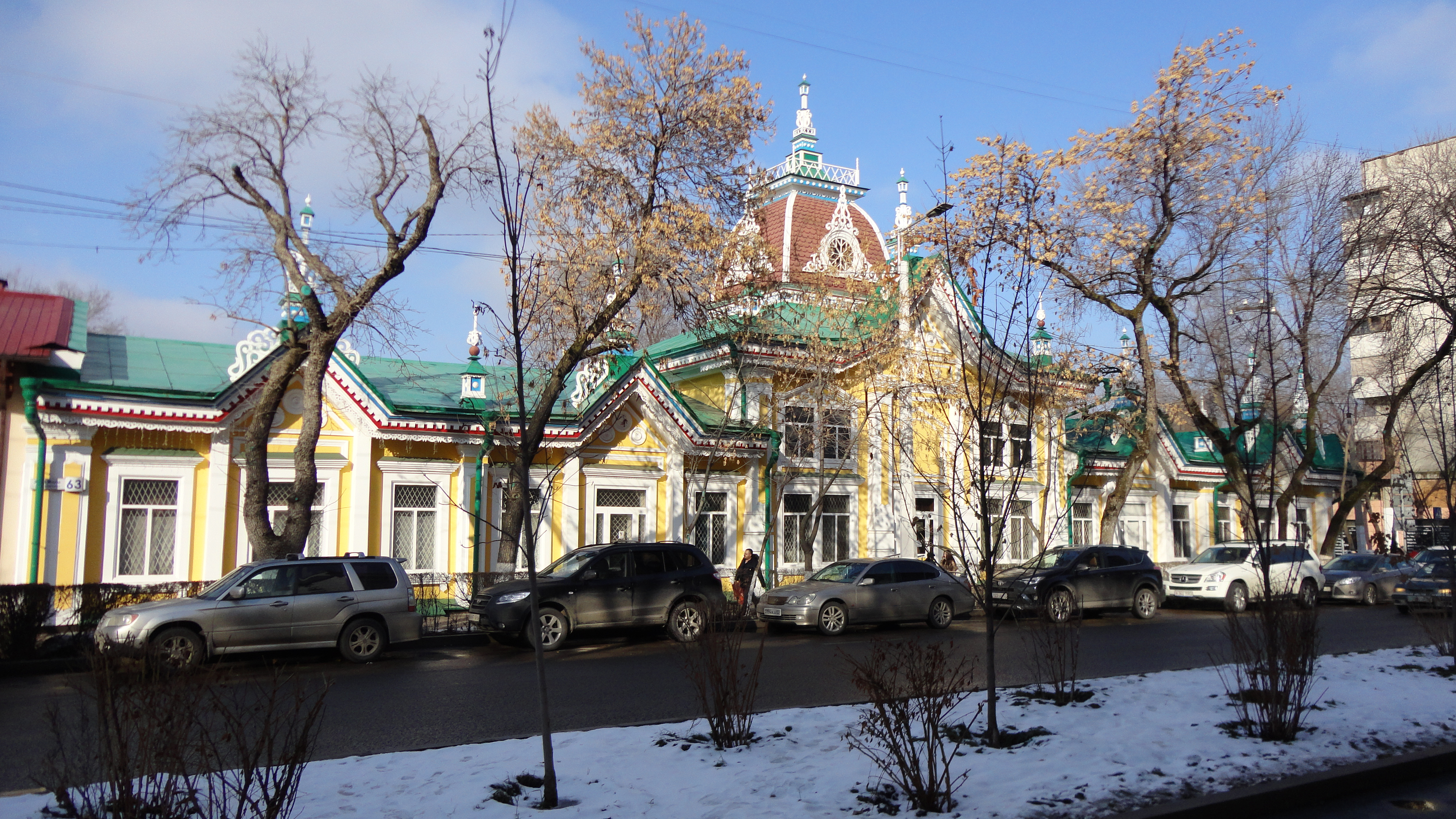
- Kyzyl-Tan building
- Interactive map of Kyzyl-Tan
- Location: Almaty, Kazakhstan

History
- Built: 1896 or 1912

Site notes
- Architect: Andrey Zenkov or Paul Gourdet

Kyzyl-Tan (Russian: Кызыл-Тан, tr. kyzyl tan) is a building of the former Verny Trading House, located at 63 Jibek Joly Street in Almaty, Kazakhstan. It is an architectural monument of the late 19th - early 20th centuries. Sources are divided on its architect and its time of construction. According to some, it was built in 1912 by the architect Andrey Zenkov. Others suggest it was built in 1896 by the architect Paul Gourdet to house Iskhak Gabdulvaliev's store. It has been protected by the state as a monument of history and culture of national importance since 1982.

== Architecture ==
The building has a rectangular plan, making a symmetrical composition. The central dome, which crowns the two-chambered volume, is the axis of symmetry. The dome with a scaled cover ends with a small spire. The pediments in the central and lateral parts are decorated with figured columns, carved cornices and underposts. The total area of the building is 1450 m^{2}.

== History ==
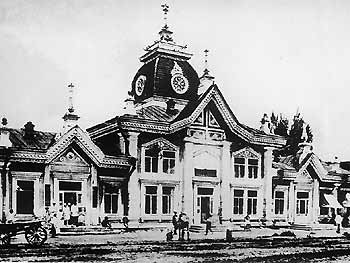
Store of merchant I. Gabdulvaliev. 1911

On 19 August 1895, Iskhak Gabdulvaliev, a Tatar merchant from Kazan, submitted an application to the Verny city council to build a store on the place No. 441 belonging to him. According to some sources the building was built in 1896 to the design of architect Paul Gourdet for Iskhak Gabdulvaliev's store. In 1901 in relation to the construction of this building was considered "The case of merchant Iskhak Gabdulvaliev for causing insult to the city architect Gourdet" under the chairmanship of A.K. Kolokolov.

In evidence submitted by Gabdulvaliev he stated:

You see, five years ago, Gourdet built me a store, but the ceilings were low, and afterwards, when I subsequently asked Gourdet through his clerks to rebuild the store, he flatly refused, saying: «Even for 1000 rubles I won't do it...».

According to other sources of information, more often appearing in the encyclopedic literature, this building was built for Gabdulvaliev in 1912 by the architect Andrey Zenkov.

After the death of Iskhak Gabdulvaliyev the building was inherited by his son Kuddus, as well as Iskhak's wife and the rest of his sons. After the October Revolution the building was nationalized. In 1931 an all-union chain "Torgsin" store was opened there.

On 4 April 1979 the decision of the executive committee of the Alma-Ata City Council of People's Deputies No. 139 "On approval of the list of historical and cultural monuments of Alma-Ata" was adopted, where the store building was listed. The decision provided to issue a protection commitment and develop projects for the restoration of monuments.

In 1979-1980 the building was completely renovated. Since 1981, the building has housed a specialty fabric store, which in Soviet times was a branch of the Central Department Store.

On 26 January 1982 the building was included in the list of historical and cultural monuments of national importance to the Kazakh SSR.

Since 2008, the building has belonged to the House of Fabrics Kyzyl-Tan LLP, to which it was transferred for trust management by tender for 10 years.

On 15 June 2009 there was a fire in the building, which started in the basement and then spread to the first floor of the building. Twelve vehicles and about 50 firefighters took part in extinguishing the fire. People were evacuated from the building (store and branch of Kazkommertsbank located in Kyzyl-Tan). As a result, the roof of the building burned out over an area of 50-70 m². The store annex, where the warehouse had been located, was completely destroyed.

On 20 April 2021, it was announced that part of the building would be demolished. In 2017, the Department of Architecture issued an architectural and planning assignment for the construction of an administrative building with an underground parking lot and the demolition of the existing structure. The conceptual design was approved in 2019.

Fire on 15 June 2009

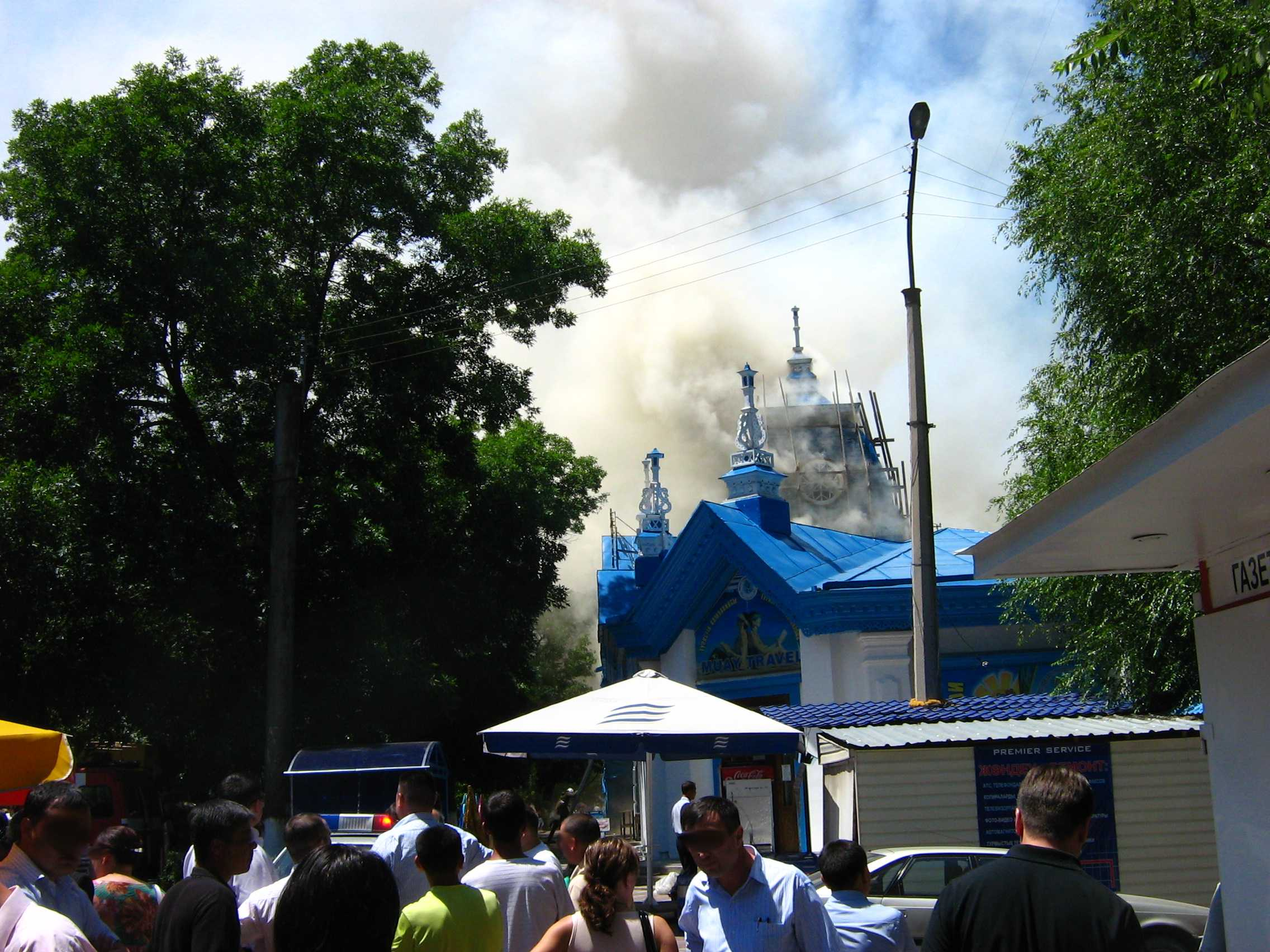
Fire on 15 June 2009

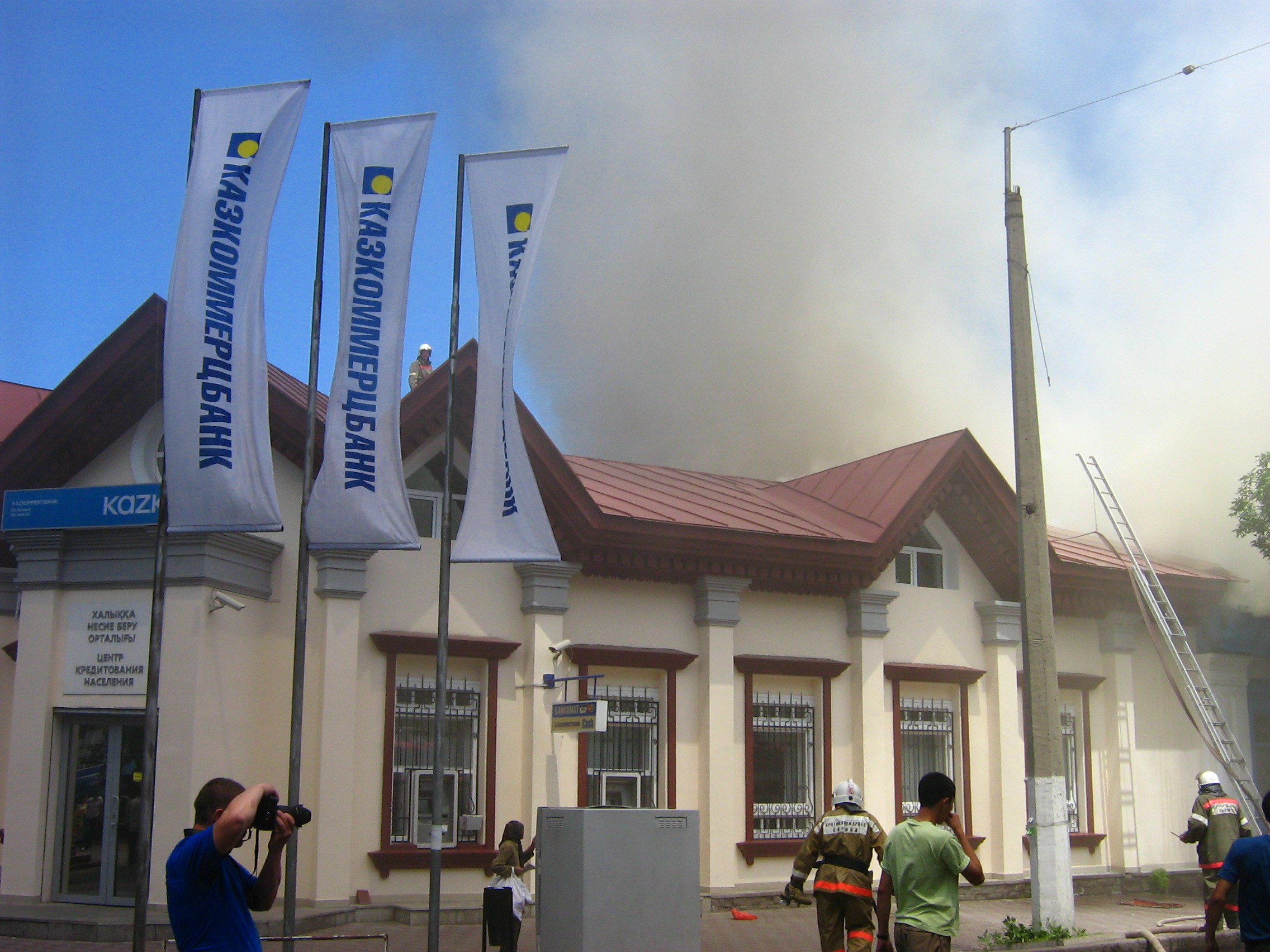
15 June 2009. Fire in the building

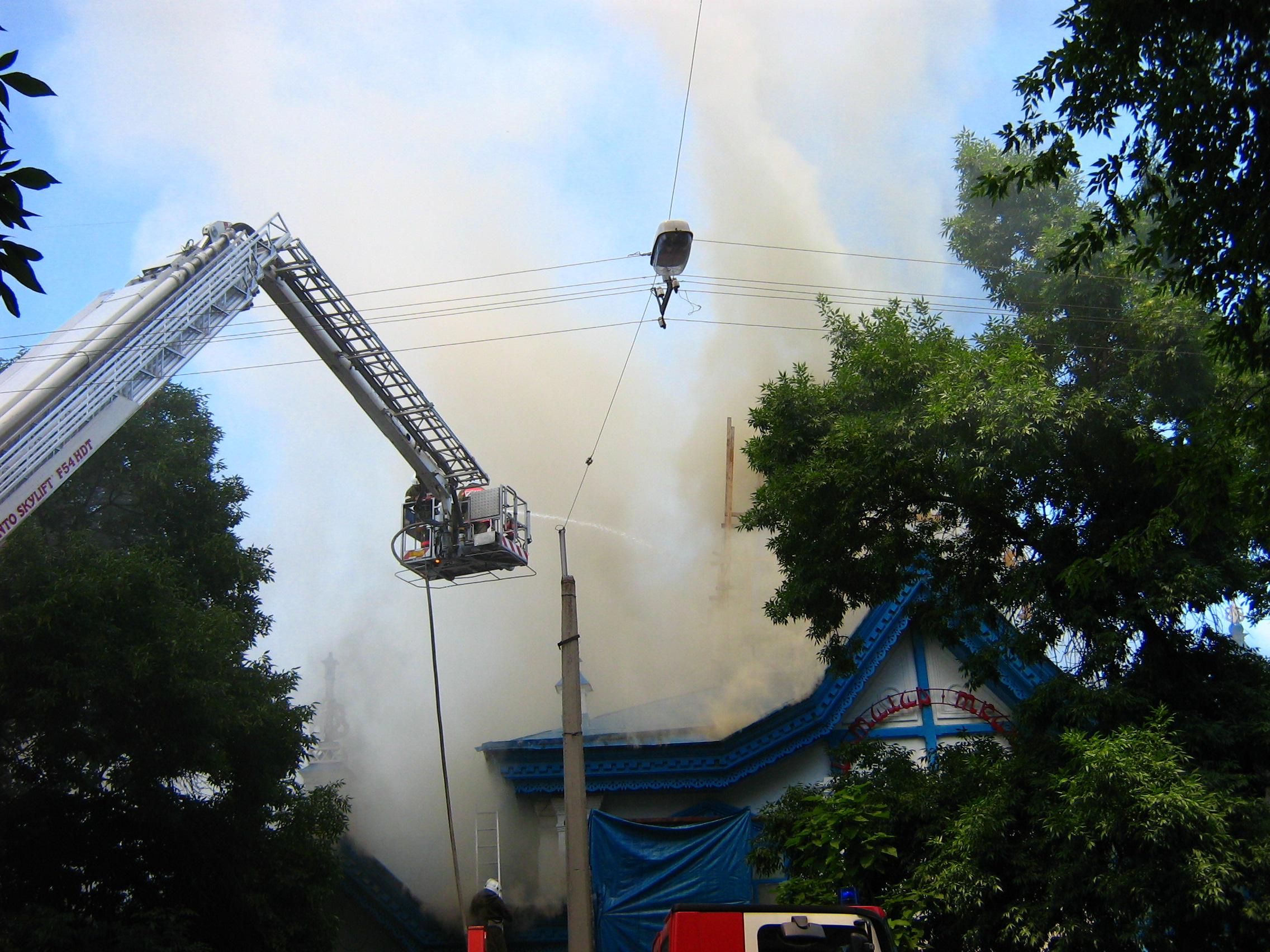
Firefighters hose down the building

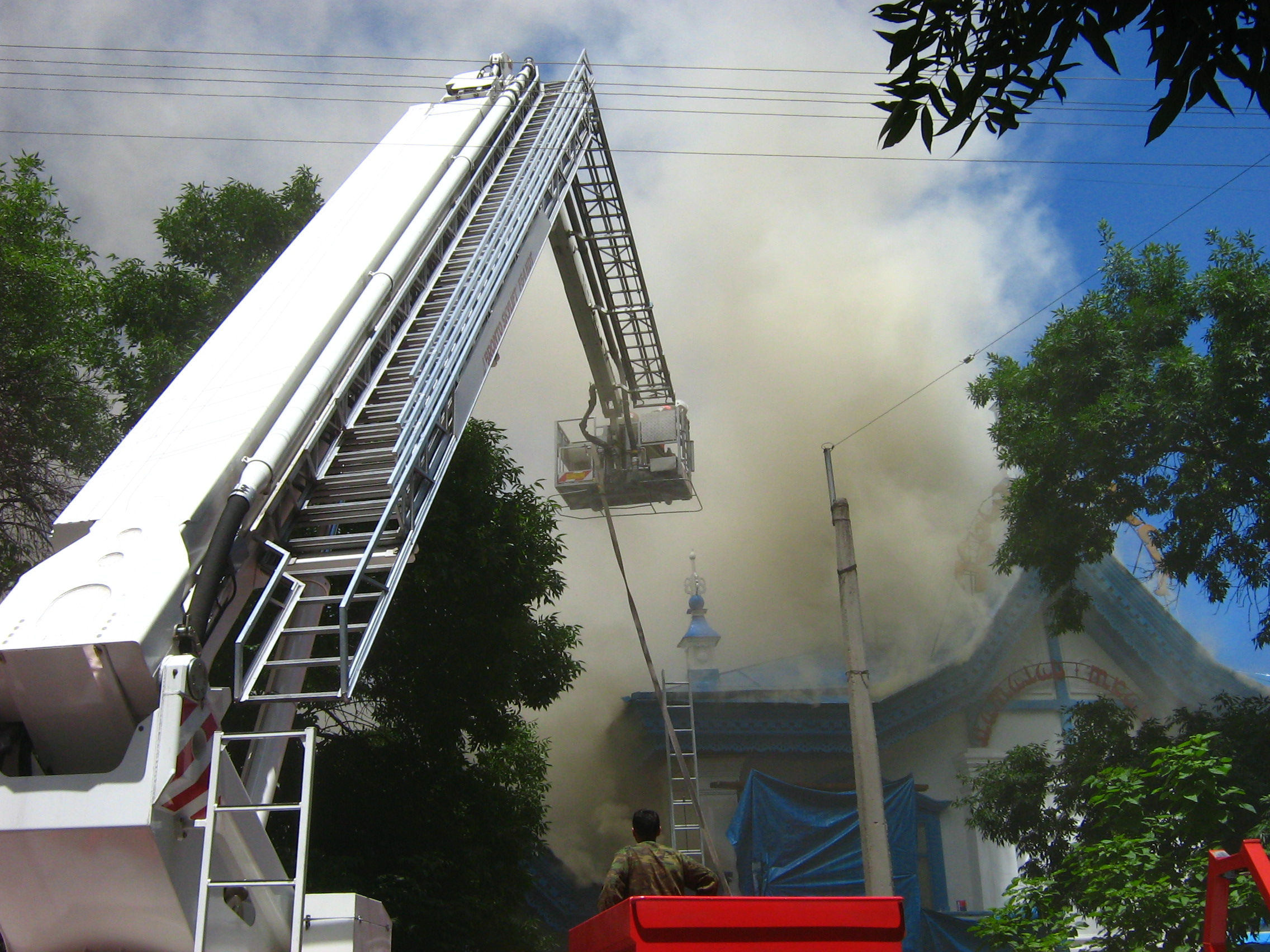
Firefighters hose down the building

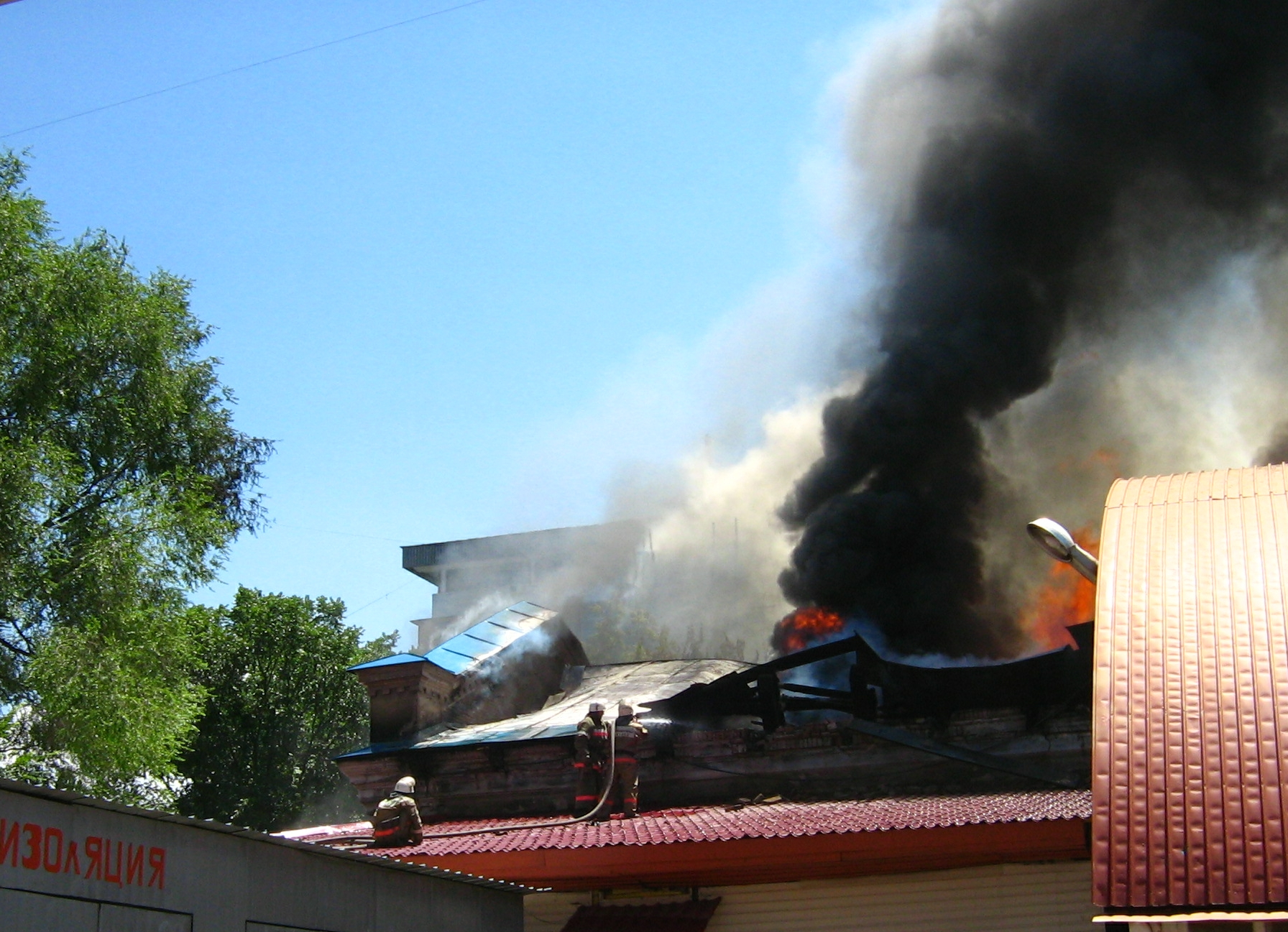
Black smoke from the warehouse - synthetic fabrics on fire

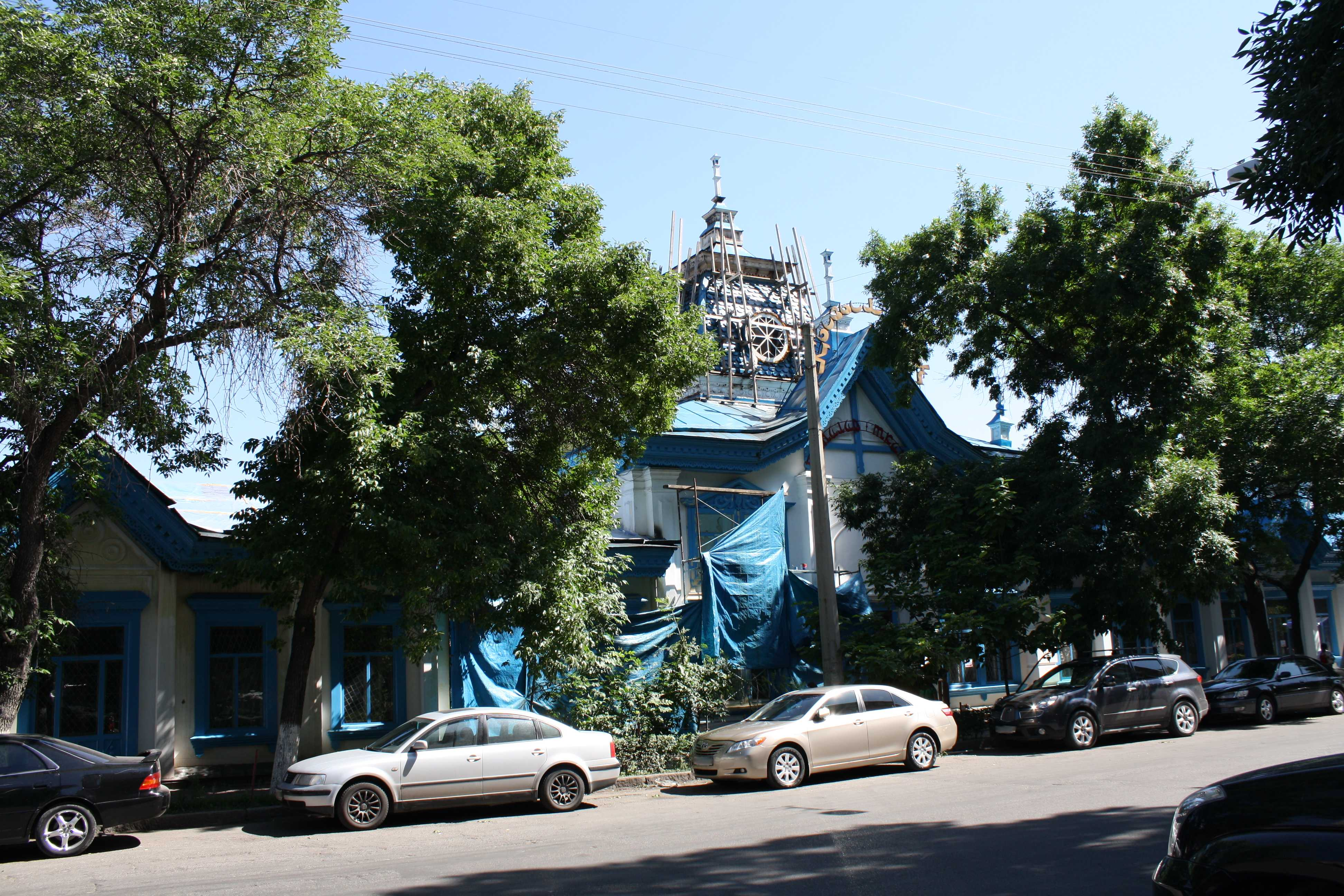
Kyzyl-Tan, 18 June 2009

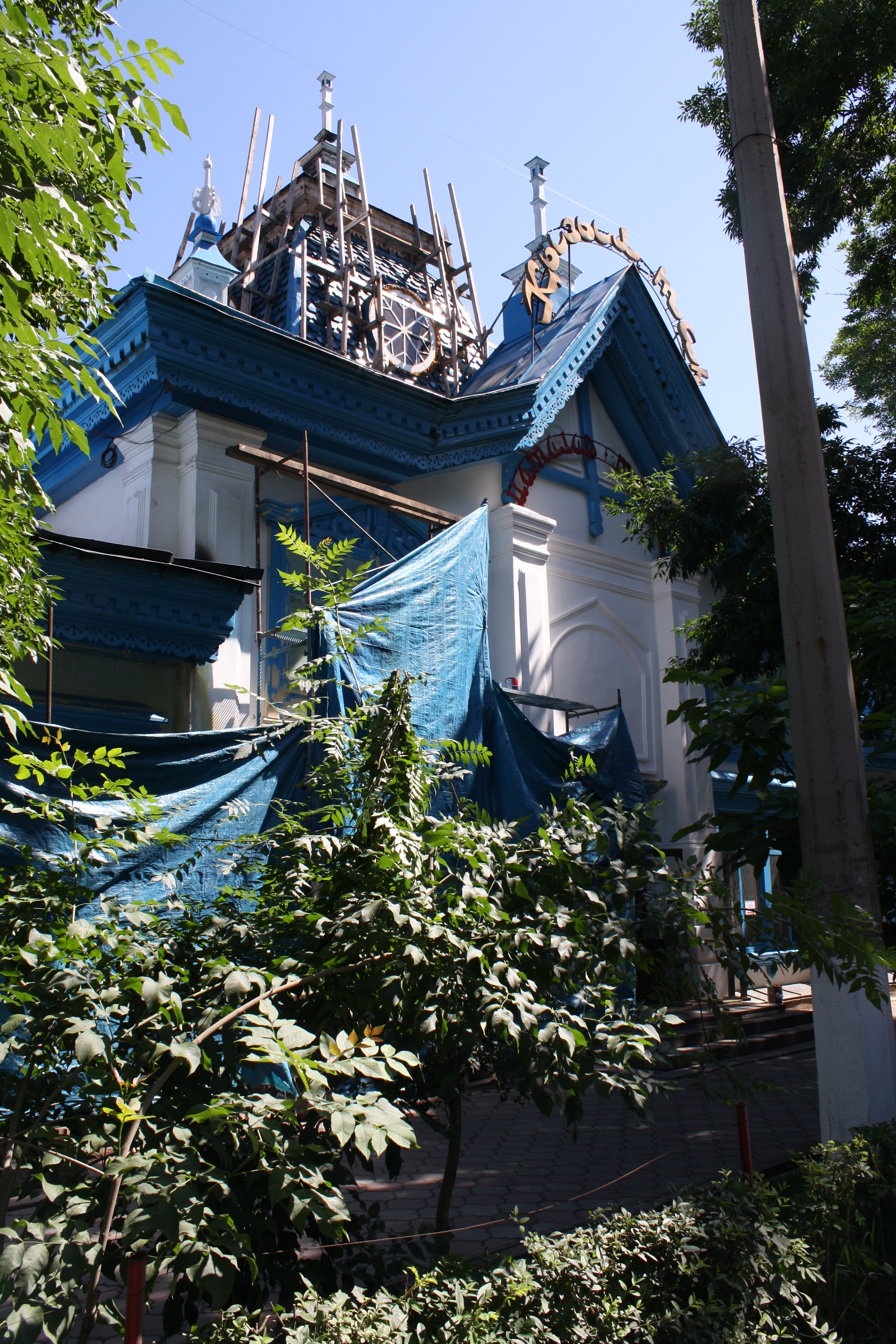
The building three days after the fire
