= Pyongyang Department Store No. 1 =

Retail store in Pyongyang, North Korea

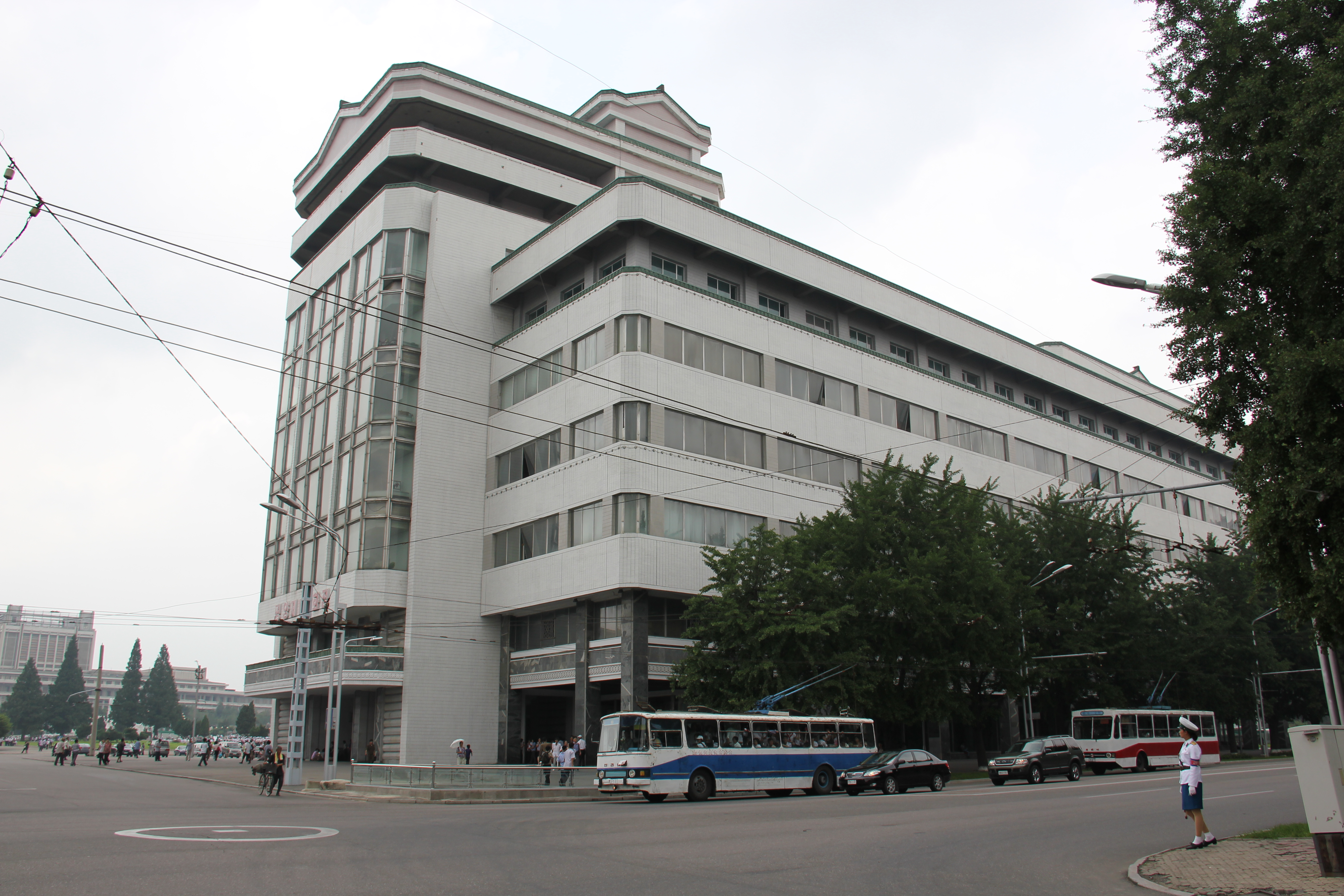

- Location within Pyongyang

General information
- Type: Department store
- Location: Sungri Street
- Coordinates: 39°1′20.14″N 125°45′11.42″E
- Completed: c. late 1980s
- Renovated: c. late 2000s – early 2010s
- Owner: Pyongyang City People's Committee of the WPK

Design and construction
- Architect: Yun Ko-gwang

Other information
- Public transit: Chŏllima: Sŭngni Trolleybus: Sadong-No.1 Department Store

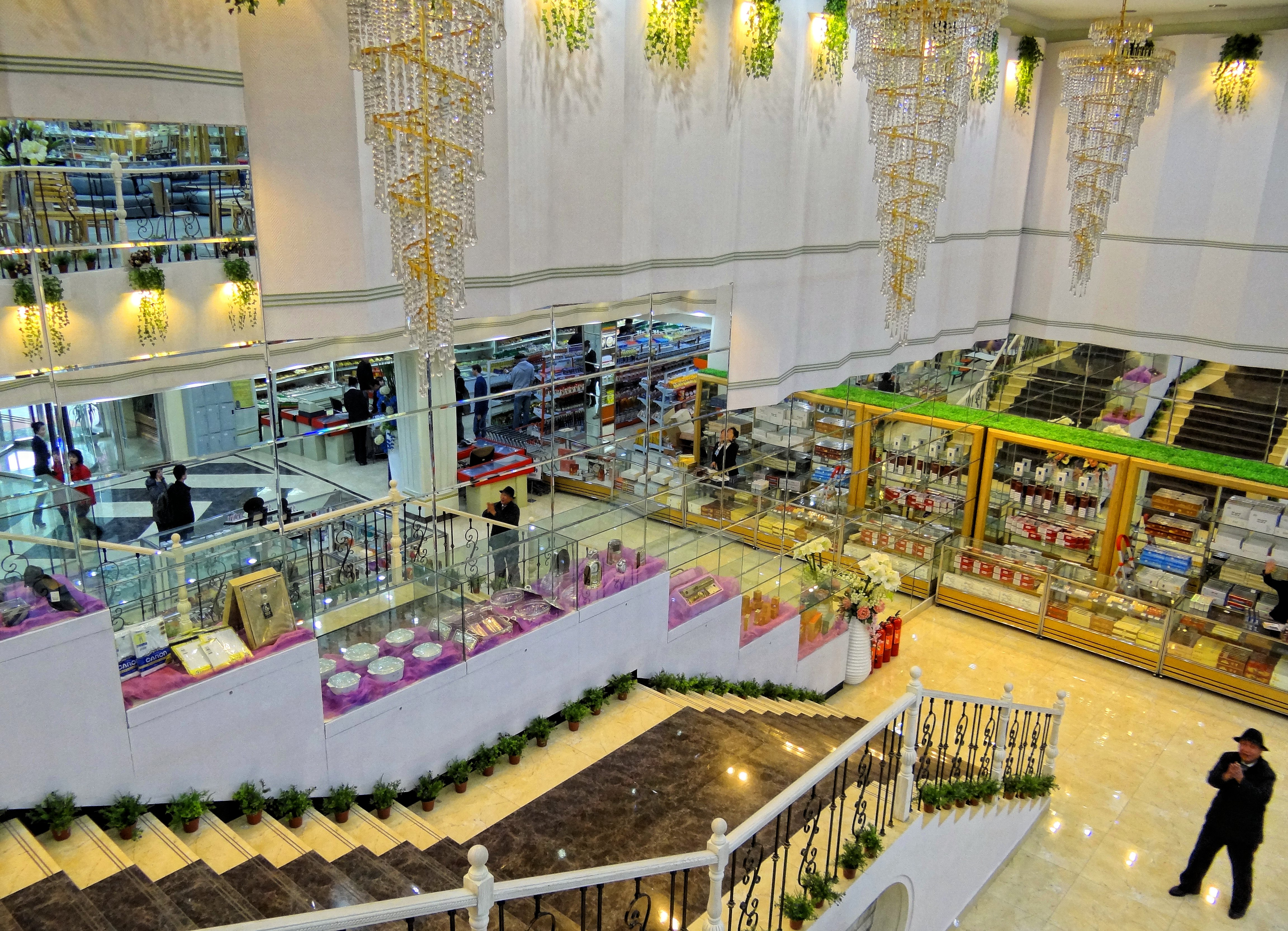
Paradise Department Store – taken from the first floor down towards the ground floor

The Pyongyang Department Store No. 1 (Korean: 평양제1백화점) is a major retail store in Pyongyang, North Korea, on Sungri Street near Kim Il-sung Square in downtown Pyongyang. It is one of the largest retail stores in the country and is often the site of large commodity exhibitions.

The store, along with two others, are reportedly run jointly with Chinese business partners.

== Shopping ==
The store offers a variety of items including electronics, clothing, furniture, foodstuffs, kitchenware, and toys. As of 2013, approximately 70 percent of the items in the store were produced domestically. The store is also one of several official tourist stops in the city. Department Store No. 1 accepts only local currency. According to the pro-North-Korean newspaper Choson Sinbo, it is a popular shopping destination for local residents and in 2016 an average of 20,000 shoppers visited the store daily.

Swedish journalist Caroline Salzinger described her visit to the department store as a tourist in the mid-2000s. Upon arrival, the store was closed. One of the tour guides accompanying her tried to distract her, while the other one rushed in to get the doors opened. When opened, the guide had to scramble passers-by to occupy the store as "shoppers". The moment they stepped in, the escalator was started. The shoppers appeared clueless as to how to act in a department store. When after great pains Salzinger managed to purchase the goods she wanted, the cashier was confused and would not hand her a plastic bag for her items: "We look at each other in the eyes. She knows that something is wrong, and that not everything is like it should, but she does not know what it is." According to Salzinger, a Western diplomat monitored the department store for one hour and saw no one come out with purchased items.

Theodore Dalrymple visited in 1989. He described the Potemkin nature of the place:

I also followed a few people around at random, as discreetly as I could. Some were occupied in ceaselessly going up and down the escalators; others wandered from counter to counter, spending a few minutes at each before moving on. They did not inspect the merchandise; they moved as listlessly as illiterates might, condemned to spend the day among the shelves of a library. I did not know whether to laugh or explode with anger or weep. But I knew I was seeing one of the most extraordinary sights of the twentieth century.

== See also ==
- Pothonggang Department Store
