= TsUM (Almaty) =

Coordinates: 43°15′44″N 76°56′29″E

- ЦУМ
- Location: Almaty, Kazakhstan
- Address: Abylai Khan Prospekt, 62
- Opened: 1961
- Architect: Mikhail Gura
- Floors: 4

TsUM — Central Universal Department Store (Kazakh: ЦУМ – Орталық әмбебап дүкен, romanized: TsUM – Ortalyq ämbebap düken; Russian: ЦУМ – Центральный универсальный магазин, romanized: TsUM – Tsentralʹnyy universalʹnyy magazin) is a department store in Almaty.

Modeled after the Moscow TsUM, the Almaty TsUM is housed in a 4-story Stalinist building located at the intersection of Abylai Khan Avenue and Jibek Joly Street in the Arbat area. The Almaty TsUM is a popular retail destination and has undergone several refurbishments over the years.

== History ==
=== Soviet era ===
The store was built in 1961 according to the design of the Kazgiproselstroy Institute. The facade was crafted in the tradition of Stalinist architecture, adorned with bas-reliefs, and featured marble stairs with carved parapets inside. The initial total floor space was 4,500 m², and during its first year, the store's trade volume reached 42.8 million rubles, prompting the need for additional space.

In 1969, an additional building was constructed adjacent to the original, designed in a style close to the constructivist architecture. The four-story building was finished with continuous glazing tapes, and its interiors were lined with marble.

With the expansion, the total area of both buildings reached 10,128 m², with an additional 5,830 m² for utility rooms. The store housed five consumer complexes across three floors: Household Goods and Household Culture on the 1st floor, Products for Men on the 2nd floor, and Products for Women and Sewing and Needlework Supplies on the 3rd floor. It offered 46 types of additional services, including fine garment fitting, fabric cutting, and processing goods on credit. Other amenities included a dining room, cafeteria, tailoring service, and hairdresser. Modern commercial and technical equipment was installed, and by 1980, most sections of the store transitioned to self-service, with new linear equipment layouts and goods organized into consumer complexes. The store also operated several branches, including the Kyzyl-Tan fabric store.

At its peak, about 130,000 customers visited TsUM daily, making over 80,000 purchases, with an annual turnover of 150 million rubles by 1982. In the 1980s, the store employed 1,600 people and ran sports teams and amateur art groups. TsUM also maintained patronage relationships with local farms and even the crew of the atomic cruiser Kirov from the Northern Fleet. In 1980, employees helped serve guests of the 1980 Summer Olympics.

The department store also played a cultural role, with its basement serving as a filming location for the Soviet cult film The Needle in 1987.

=== Modern period ===
In 1994, as part of the economic reforms, Western consultants recommended privatizing the store by selling it to private entities. The store was subsequently transformed into the joint-stock company Kazakh Republican Trading House ZANGAR JSC, with the well-known Kazakh holding company Butya becoming its owner. Following this transition, various sellers and tenants began operating within TsUM's trading floors. In 1998, a five-story administrative building was added to the second building from the Alimjanov Street side. By the mid-2000s, the first floor of the second department store building had turned into a bustling mobile flea market, primarily selling cell phones and accessories.

In 2013, Ardis LLP initiated a major reconstruction project, though the original design was later revised. The reconstruction, which took place from 1 April 2013 to September 2014, brought significant changes to the second building’s external and internal appearance. The formerly glazed facade from the 2nd to 4th floors was replaced with solid-colored plastic panels, which included spaces for advertising banners. The basement was partially converted into retail space, eventually housing a branch of the Magnum ATAK retail chain. Despite the transformations, parts of the original facade and the iconic marble staircases of the first building were preserved. New windows and entrances were added, with separate rooms created, each having its own external access. A six-story movie theater was also constructed in the courtyard between the two buildings.
