= Base exchange =

Retail store on a U.S. military installation

An exchange is a type of retail store found on United States military installations worldwide. Once similar to trading posts, today they resemble modern department stores or strip malls. The terminology varies by armed service; some examples include base exchange (BX), and post exchange (PX), and there are more specific terms for subtypes of exchange.

== Operations ==
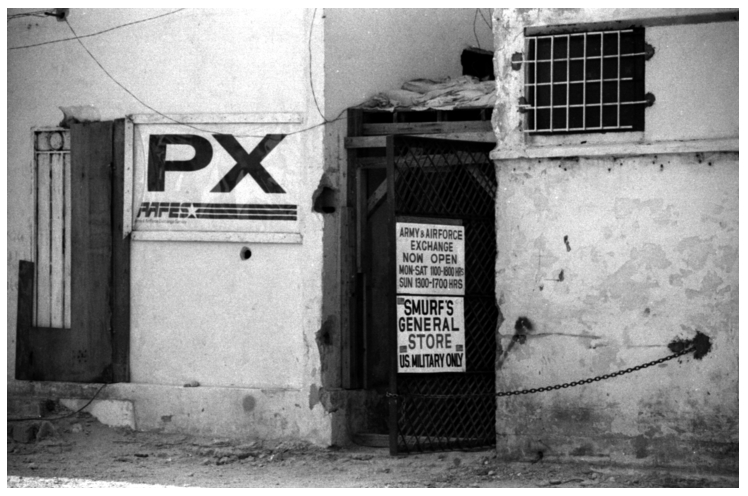
An AAFES-operated post exchange (now closed) located at the old international airport in Mogadishu, Somalia, in January 1994

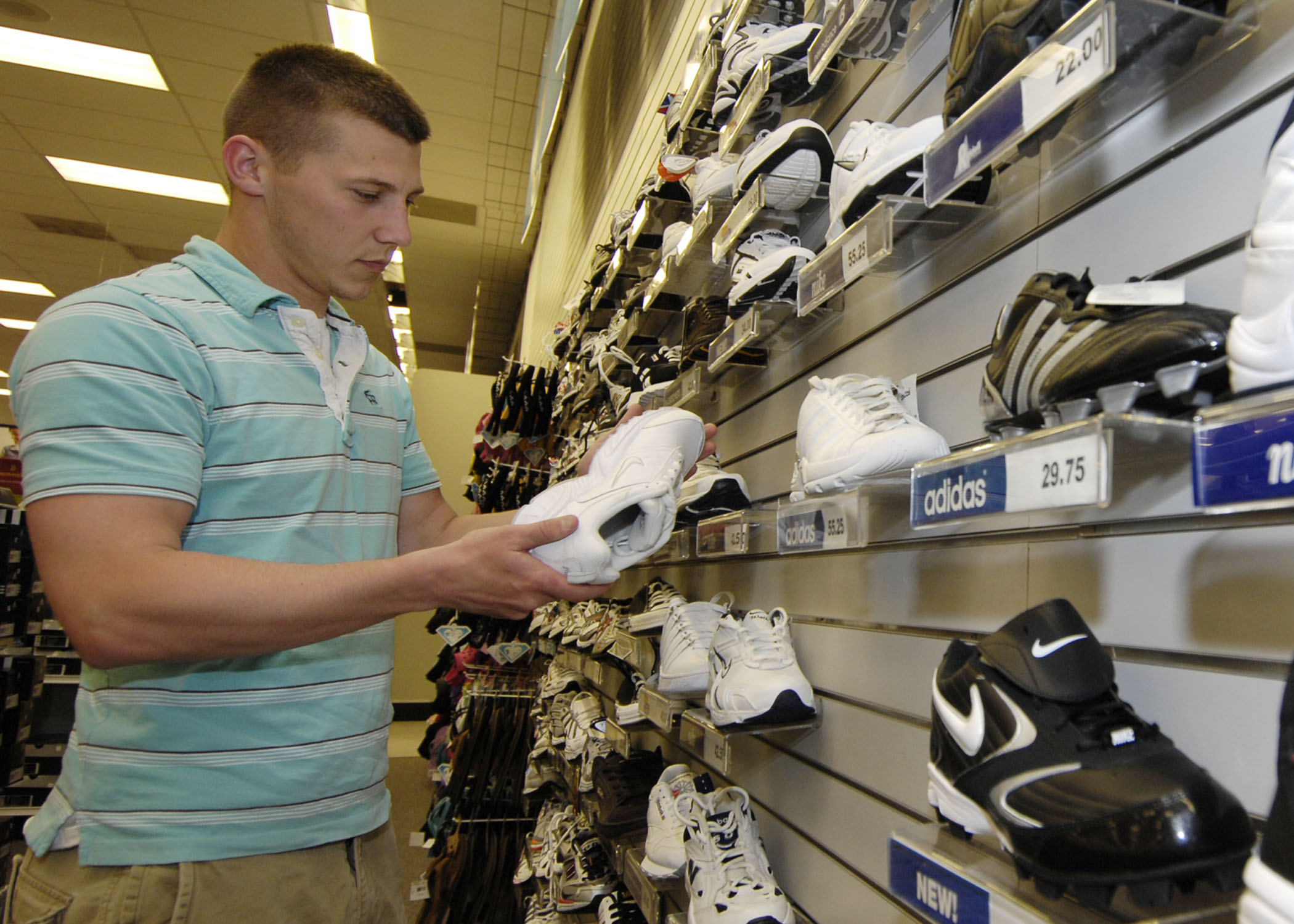
A U.S. Army soldier shops for shoes at the base exchange (BX) at Scott Air Force Base in May 2008.

Base exchanges sell consumer goods and services to authorized patrons such as active duty, reserve, national guard, retired members of the U.S. Uniformed Services and their dependents. Other authorized patrons include honorably discharged veterans certified 100% disabled and/or totally and permanently disabled (TPD) by the Veterans Administration, recipients of the Medal of Honor, military transition personnel, DoD employees, Red Cross personnel who are U.S. citizens assigned outside the United States with the military service. Authority to use these facilities is normally determined by presentation of the U.S. Uniformed Services Privilege and Identification Card, either when entering the store or when paying for goods and services.

Online base exchange shopping privileges were extended to all honorably discharged veterans beginning on November 11, 2017. The DEERS database is used to verify non-disabled veterans' eligibility for the online shopping benefit.

Limited base exchange privileges are extended to members of the Civil Air Patrol and United States Coast Guard Auxiliary. Reserve Officer Training Corps (ROTC), Junior Reserve Officer Training Corps (JROTC), United States Naval Sea Cadet Corps, and Civil Air Patrol cadets may all have varying degrees of privileges (such as only being allowed to shop for uniform items or only being allowed when visiting installations as part of a sponsored activity). Foreign national active duty officer and enlisted members, when visiting U.S. military installation for unofficial business. Merchandise is restricted to quantities required for personal use. At many overseas locations, exchange privileges are determined as part of the local status of forces agreement.

Shopping privileges are also generally extended in overseas locations to U.S. federal government civilian employees and their dependents who are assigned overseas. Shopping privileges can vary overseas according to applicable status-of-forces agreements with host nations. A typical exchange is similar to a department store, but other services such as military clothing sales/uniform shops, barber shops, hair care, beauty, laundry/dry cleaning, gas stations, fast food outlets, convenience stores ("Expresses"), beer and wine sales, liquor stores ("Class Six" or "Package Stores"), lawn and garden shops, movie theaters and even vehicle maintenance and repair services are commonly available. Most (but not all) sales by exchanges are free of state and local sales or VAT taxes as the sales take place on U.S. military reservations (exceptions include gasoline sales in the U.S. and sales by concessionaires licensed by the exchange).

Unlike commissaries (military grocery stores), exchanges, for the most part, do not receive significant appropriations from the federal government and must operate on a for-profit basis. With the exception of military personnel assigned to duty with the exchange services, exchange service employees' salaries are paid from revenues generated from sales of merchandise, except for annual raises from funds appropriated by Congress. Exchanges are deemed Category C non-appropriated fund (NAF) activities, meaning they are designed to not only be self-sufficient, but generate a profit.

Exchanges are normally located on military reservations and, as a result, do not pay rent or tax for the use of land. Exchanges' tax-exempt status (as instrumentalities of the U.S. Government) also reduces certain operating expenses. While exchanges must pay for the cost of transporting goods within the contiguous United States, Congress appropriates funds to subsidize the transportation costs of American merchandise to overseas exchange locations so that such items are available and affordable to personnel stationed overseas.

Roughly 70% of the exchange earnings are paid to MWR programs. In the last ten years, more than $2.24 billion has been contributed by the exchange to the Army and Air Force to spend on quality of life improvements for Soldiers, Airmen and their families—Youth Services, Armed Forces Recreation Centers, arts and crafts, aquatic centers, post functions and golf courses.

Exchanges play an important role for U.S. military and federal government personnel assigned overseas as they are often the only local source for American retail merchandise, such as clothing, electronics, books and magazines, fast food, etc. Exchanges also supply gasoline at prices roughly approximating those in the U.S., normally on a rationed basis, to overseas personnel for personal use, since fuel prices in most foreign countries (where U.S. military are stationed) are normally much higher due to local taxes.

== See also ==
- Army and Air Force Exchange Service
- Defense Commissary Agency
- Navy, Army and Air Force Institutes
- Navy Exchange
- Public department store
- Public grocery store
- Washington Navy Yard
