= Paul Gourdet =

French architect

Paul Gourdet (French: Paul Louis Stanislas Lionel Gourdet) was a French architect. He is credited for designing numerous major buildings in Kazakhstan including the Voznesensky Cathedral (Ascension Cathedral), the Pokrovskaya Church, and other significant contributions to the architectural development of Almaty. Gourdet was born in Burgundy, and resided in Verny. In 1870 he travelled to the Turkestan region.

== See also ==
- Architecture of Almaty
