= Jibek Joly Street =

Street in Almaty, Kazakhstan

Zhibek Zholy
- Native name: Жібек Жолы көшесі (Kazakh); Улица Жибек Жолы (Russian)
- Former names: Torgovaya Street; (Before 1936): Gorky Street; (1936–1991)
- Length: 4200 m
- Location: Almaty, Kazakhstan

Jibek Joly Street or Zhibek Zholy Street is a street in the center of Almaty, Kazakhstan; the pedestrian part of the street is known as the Arbat.

== Location ==
Jibek Joly Street is located in Medeu and Zhetysu districts, between Gogol and Makatayev streets. It starts at the Central Park, crosses Baribayev, Dostyk, Kunayev, Furmanov, Abylai Khan, Nauryzbai batyr, and Seyfullin streets, and ends at Masanchi Street. The street is 4200 m long.

It is a one-way public transport route from Kaldayakov street to Kunayev Street.

== Sights ==
- Kyzyl-Tan, 63 Jibek Joly Street
