= Reserve components of the United States Armed Forces =

Reserve forces of the U.S. military

The reserve components of the United States Armed Forces are military organizations whose members generally perform a minimum of 39 days of military duty per year and who augment the active duty (or full-time) military when necessary. The reserve components are also referred to collectively as the National Guard and Reserve.

According to 10 U.S.C. § 10102, "the purpose of each reserve component is to provide trained units and qualified persons available for active duty in the armed forces, in time of war or national emergency, and at such other times as the national security may require, to fill the needs of the armed forces whenever, during and after the period needed to procure and train additional units and qualified persons to achieve the planned mobilization, more units and persons are needed than are in the regular components."

== Reserve components ==
There are seven reserve components of the U.S. military, which are divided into two categories: regular reserves and National Guard.

=== Regular reserves ===
- Army Reserve
- Navy Reserve
- Marine Corps Reserve
- Air Force Reserve
- Coast Guard Reserve

=== National Guard ===
- Army National Guard
- Air National Guard

=== Civilian auxiliaries distinguished ===
The civilian auxiliaries of the U.S. military are not considered reserve components of the respective Services, but do serve as force multipliers:

- Civil Air Patrol, auxiliary to the Air Force
- Coast Guard Auxiliary, auxiliary to the Coast Guard
- Merchant Marine, auxiliary to the Navy
- Military Auxiliary Radio System
- Marine Corps Cyber Auxiliary

These auxiliaries are generally excluded from direct combat roles. However, during World War II, members of the Civil Air Patrol and the Coast Guard Auxiliary were sometimes armed. Civil Air Patrol pilots engaged in anti-submarine patrols, armed with bombs, and engaged over 100 U-boats. Members of the Coast Guard Auxiliary could volunteer as "temporary reservists", for duty as armed port security and harbor patrol officers.

While merchant mariners were usually not armed, armed Navy or Coast Guard crews were frequently embarked on Merchant Marine vessels. U-boats preying on allied shipping in the Atlantic made service as a merchant mariner extremely hazardous. In the 1980s, some Merchant Mariners who had sailed during World War II, were granted veteran benefits.

=== State military forces distinguished ===
Additionally, under the U.S. Constitution, each State (or Commonwealth), may have additional organized militia, such as the various State guards and State naval militias. These State forces are not normally considered to be reserve components because they are not federal forces and fall under the jurisdiction and command of each state's respective governor, even though they perform a military function. Nearly every state has laws authorizing state defense forces, and 22 states, plus the Commonwealth of Puerto Rico, have active SDFs with different levels of activity, support, and strength. State defense forces generally operate with emergency management and homeland security missions. These forces are trained and equipped to perform specialized roles such as search and rescue, maritime patrols, augmenting state police or National Guard military police in a law enforcement role, or emergency management response. These forces may be armed or equipped, and have powers of arrest, as each State requires, and as State forces are not subject to the limitations of the Posse Comitatus laws governing Federal military forces' engaged in law enforcement duties.

Historically, the most important role of State Guards was to provide a military presence in a state when the national guard was deployed elsewhere or not available. While State defense forces may be called into State Active Duty status, thereby eligible for pay and benefits as provided by each State's laws, they are also subject to State military disciplinary codes when in a duty status. They are normally all-volunteer units who serve without pay, having only those benefits provided by State law, and often have no access to retirement credit or medical benefits beyond the equivalent of workman's compensation for "in the line of duty" injuries or illness. State Defense Forces cannot be Federalised, as organizations, during a mobilization of a State's National Guard, but the individuals within the State Defense Forces are subject to each State, and Federal, laws governing recall to duty for either State or Federal service, induction via a Federal draft, or "calling forth the militia" under various State laws or the Federal Insurrection Act. In contrast, members of the National Guard, which is a State's primary organized militia force, can be mobilized (or Federalized) to support federal requirements, thereby becoming part of the National Guard of the United States.

== General information ==
The reserve components are the embodiment of the American tradition of the citizen-soldier dating back to before the American Revolutionary War. They are typically, but not always, regionally based and recruited (unlike their active duty counterparts) and, in the case of the Army and Air National Guard, are the organized state militias referred to in the U.S. Constitution.

Members of the reserve components are generally required to perform, at a minimum, 39 days of military service per year. This includes monthly drill weekends and fifteen days of annual training (giving rise to the slogan "one weekend a month, two weeks a year"). However, many members of the reserve components will perform well in excess of this amount, often in the realm of 120 to 179 days of combined drill duty and active duty per year. Personnel in this latter category are typically assigned to specialized combat units in the reserve components that require additional duty in order to maintain proficiency, such as pilots, flight officers and enlisted aircrewmen in flying units or special operations forces personnel (e.g., Army Special Forces, Navy SEALs, etc.) in SOF units.

While organized, trained, and equipped nearly the same as the active duty, the reserve components often have unique characteristics. This is especially true of the National Guard, which performs both federal and state missions. In addition, reserve components often operate under special laws, regulations, and policies.

== Reserve vs. National Guard ==
The Reserve Components of the United States Armed forces are named within Title 10 of the United States Code and include the Army National Guard, the Army Reserve, the Navy Reserve, the Marine Corps Reserve, the Air National Guard, the Air Force Reserve, and the Coast Guard Reserve. In practice, the use of the term reserve varies depending on the context in which it is used. In one context, it applies to all seven of the reserve components of the U.S. military. In another context, it applies to only the five reserve components directly associated with the five active duty military services but neither to the Army National Guard nor the Air National Guard.

In most respects, the Army National Guard and Air National Guard are very similar to the Army Reserve and Air Force Reserve, respectively. The primary difference lies in the level of government to which they are subordinated. The Army Reserve and Air Force Reserve are subordinated to the federal government while the National Guards are subordinated to the various state governments, except when called into federal service by the President of the United States or as provided for by law. For example, the California Army National Guard and California Air National Guard are subordinated to the state of California and report to the governor of California as their commander-in-chief.

This unique relationship descends from the colonial and state militias that served as a balance against a standing federal army, which many Americans feared would threaten states' rights. The portions of each state's militia subject to federal activation were organized into the present National Guard system with the Militia Act of 1903. The portions of a state's government sponsored militia that remain, if any, are the State Defense Force for that state.

Besides the theoretical check on federal power, the distinction between the federal military reserves and the National Guard permits state governors to use their personnel to assist in disaster relief and to preserve law and order in times of crisis. The latter is permitted because the National Guard are not subject to the restrictions of the Posse Comitatus Act unless they are under federal jurisdiction. The restrictions, however, do apply to the four of the other five reserve components just as it does with their active duty military counterparts.

== Militia and Reserve ==
While the National Guard is a militia force organized by each state, it is also a reserve federal military force of the United States Armed Forces. The National Guard is joint reserve component of the United States Army and the United States Air Force and are made up of National Guard members from the states appointed to federal military service under the consent of their respective state governors. The National Guard maintains two subcomponents: the Army National Guard for the Army and the Air Force's Air National Guard.

== Reserve component categories ==
All members of a reserve component are assigned to one of three reserve component categories:

- The Ready Reserve comprises military members of the Reserve and National Guard, organized in units or as individuals, liable for recall to active duty to augment the active components in time of war or national emergency. The Ready Reserve consists of three reserve component subcategories:
  - The Selected Reserve consist of those units and individuals within the Ready Reserve designated by their respective Services and approved by the Chairman of the Joint Chiefs of Staff as so essential to initial wartime missions that they have priority over all other Reserves. The Selected Reserve consists of additional sub-subcategories:
    - Drilling Reservists/Traditional Reservists (TR) - Unit Program/Traditional Guardsmen (TG) - Unit Program/Troop Program Units (TPUs) are trained unit members who participate in unit training activities on a part-time basis.
    - Training Pipeline (non-deployable account) personnel are enlisted members of the Selected Reserve who have not yet completed initial active duty for training (IADT) and officers who are in training for professional categories or in undergraduate flying training.
    - Individual Mobilization Augmentees (IMAs) are trained individuals assigned to an active component, Selective Service System, or Federal Emergency Management Agency (FEMA) organization's billet which must be filled on or shortly after mobilization. IMAs participate in training activities on a part-time basis with an active component unit in preparation for recall in a mobilization.
    - Active Guard/Reserve (AGR) are National Guard or Reserve members of the Selected Reserve who are ordered to active duty or full-time National Guard duty for the purpose of organizing, administering, recruiting, instructing, or training the reserve component units.
  - Individual Ready Reserve (IRR) personnel are not obligated to drill, conduct annual training, or participate in any military activities (except for periodic Muster activities) unless activated by Presidential Reserve Callup Authority or electing to drill, train, or serve in a "Drill without Pay" or an "Active Duty" role. Individual Ready Reserve personnel provide a manpower pool composed principally of individuals having had training, having previously served in an active duty component or in the Selected Reserve, or having some period of their military service obligation (MSO) remaining.
  - Inactive National Guard (ING) are National Guard personnel in an inactive status in the Ready Reserve, not in the Selected Reserve, attached to a specific National Guard unit, who are required to muster once a year with their assigned unit but do not participate in training activities. On mobilization, ING members mobilize with their units.
- The Standby Reserve consists of personnel who maintain their affiliation without being in the Ready Reserve, who have been designated key civilian employees, or who have a temporary hardship or disability. They are not required to perform training and are not part of units but create a pool of trained individuals who could be mobilized if necessary as a last resort to fill manpower needs in specific skills. Membership in the Standby Reserve is limited to one year, afterwards the Soldier must determine if they are transferring to the IRR or a drilling unit.
  - Active Status List are those Standby Reservists temporarily assigned for hardship or other cogent reason; those not having fulfilled their military service obligation or those retained in active status when provided for by law; or those members of Congress and others identified by their employers as "key personnel" and who have been removed from the Ready Reserve because they are critical to the national security in their civilian employment.
  - Inactive Status List are those Standby Reservists who are not required by law or regulation to remain in an active program and who retain their Reserve affiliation in a non-participating status, and those who have skills which may be of possible future use to the Armed Force concerned.
- The Retired Reserve consists of all Reserve officers and enlisted personnel who receive retired pay on the basis of active duty or reserve service; all Reserve officers and enlisted personnel who are otherwise eligible for retired pay but have not reached age sixty, who have not elected discharge, and are not voluntary members of the Ready or Standby Reserve; and other retired reservists under certain conditions.

== Mobilization ==
Individual service members, portions of units, or entire units of the reserve components may be called into active duty (also referred to as mobilized, activated, or called up), under several conditions:

- Full Mobilization (10 USC 12301(a)) requires a declaration of war or national emergency by the United States Congress, affects all reservists (including those on inactive status and retired reserve members), and may last until six months after the war or emergency for which it was declared.
- Partial Mobilization (10 USC 12302) requires a declaration of national emergency, affects only the Ready Reserve, and is limited to a maximum of one million personnel activated for no more than two years.
- Presidential Reserve Call-Ups (10 USC 12304) do not require a declaration of national emergency but do require the President to notify Congress, and is limited to 200,000 Selected Reservists and 30,000 Individual Ready Reservists for up to 270 days.
- Military Reserve Emergency Activation (10 USC 12304a) allows the SecDef to activate the Ready Reserves (minus the Guard) in response to major disasters or emergencies for up to 120 days.
- Combatant Commander Preplanned Missions (10 USC 12304b) allows individual service secretaries to augment the active forces for preplanned missions in support of the combatant commands for up to 365 consecutive days and is limited to 60,000 Selected Reservists.
- The 15-Day Statute (10 USC 12301(b)) allows individual service secretaries to call up the Ready Reserves for up to 15 days per year for annual training or operational missions.
- RC Volunteers (10 USC 12301(d)) may voluntarily request to go on active duty regardless of their reserve component category, but state governors must approve activating National Guard personnel.
- Retired Reservists with 20 or more years of active duty are subject to involuntary recall by the President under 10 USC 688.

Note: while Regular Component (or commonly called Active Component [AC]) retirees are part of the Total Force of available manpower if needed, they remain part of the AC for life, whether retired for disability or longevity, carried on their Service's AC Retired List in a reduced state of readiness. It is generally easier to recall a retired AC member using 10 USC 688 authority than recalling a Retired Reservist (with less than 20 years of active duty) using any of the 10 USC 123XX mobilization authorities.

== See also ==
- Ready Reserve Corps of the U.S. Public Health Service
- Military reserve force
- World Basic Information Library (WBIL)
