= Defense Commissary Agency =

Agency of the United States Department of Defense

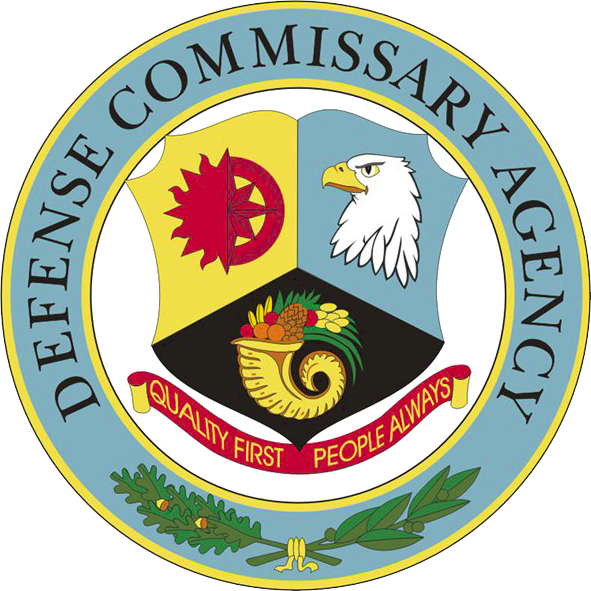
- DeCA Seal

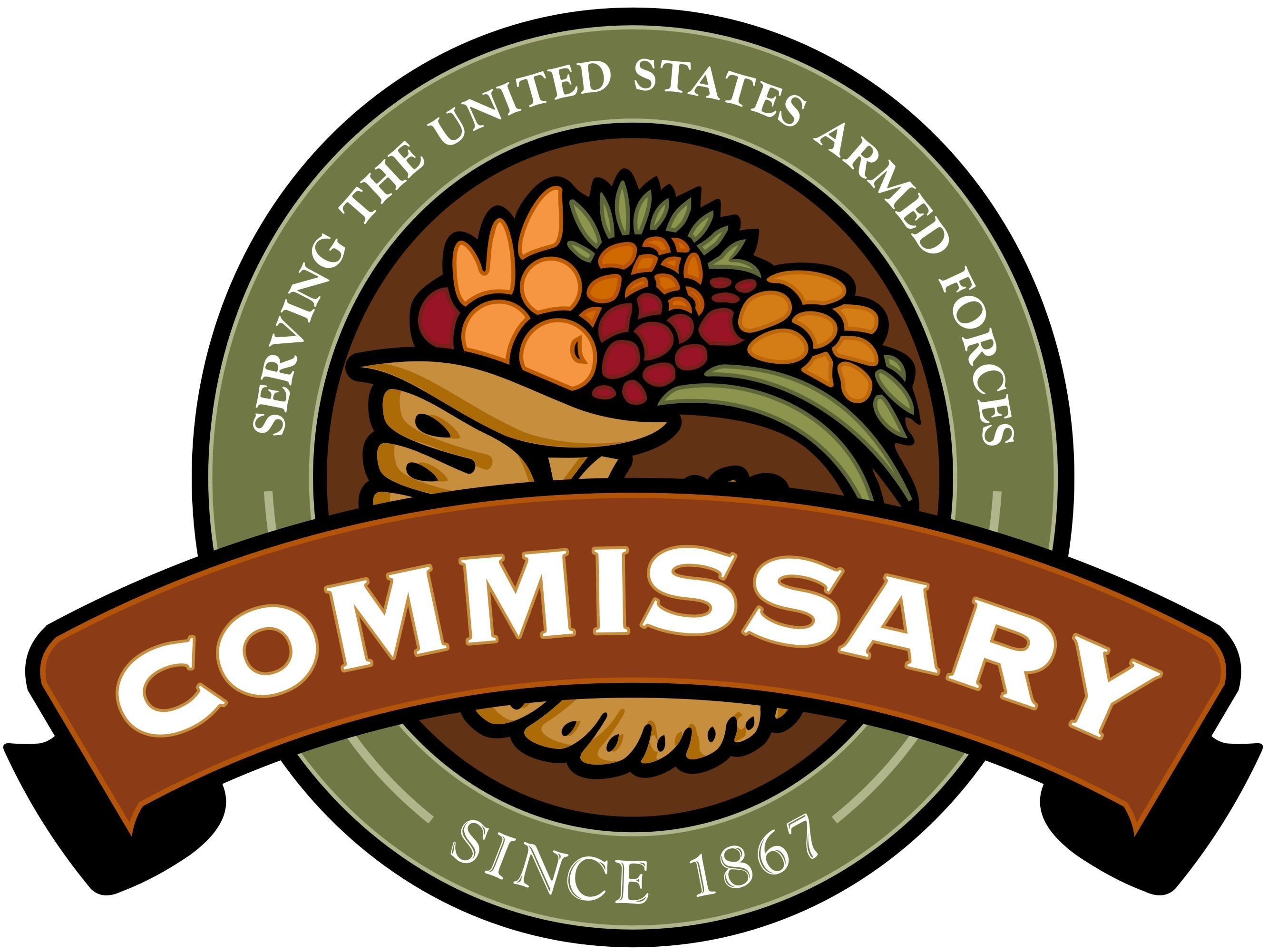
- Cornucopia Logo

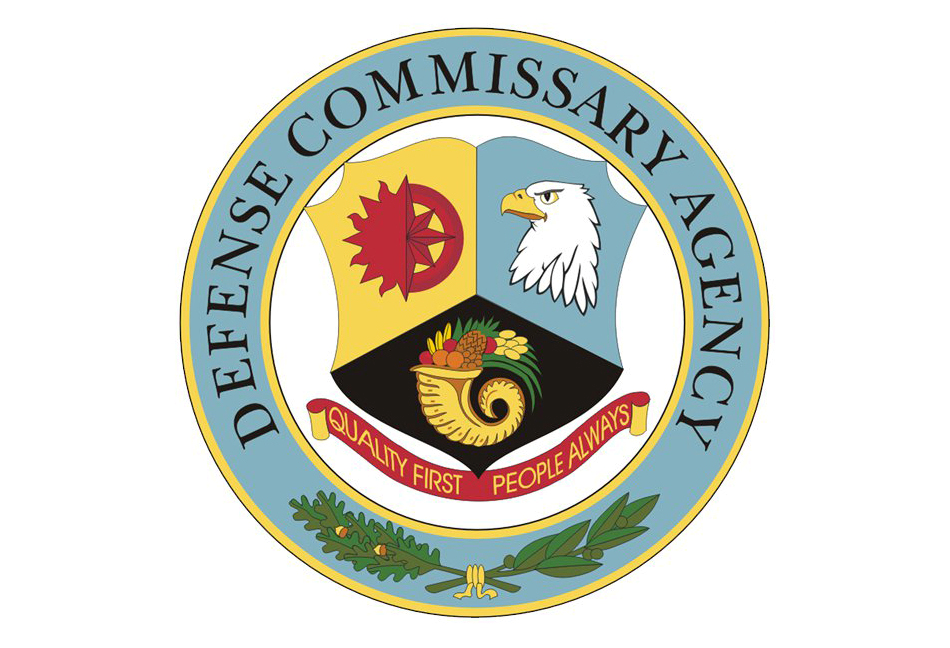
- Flag of the Defense Commissary Agency

Agency overview
- Formed: 1990–1991; 35 years ago
- Headquarters: Fort Lee, Prince George County, Virginia, U.S.
- Agency executive: William G. "BILL" Fitzhugh, Director and Chief Executive Officer
- Website: www.commissaries.com

The Defense Commissary Agency (DeCA), headquartered at Fort Lee, Virginia, is an agency of the United States Department of Defense (DoD) that operates nearly 240 commissaries worldwide. American military commissaries sell groceries and household goods to active-duty, Guard, Reserve, and retired members of all eight uniformed services of the United States and eligible members of their families at cost plus surcharge, saving authorized patrons thousands of dollars compared to civilian supermarkets. DeCA has an annual cost of around $1.4 billion.

== History ==
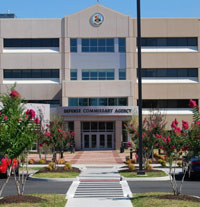
DeCA Headquarters in Fort Lee, Virginia

The commissary benefit is not a recent innovation. Sales of goods from commissary department storehouses to military personnel began in 1825, when U.S. Army officers at specified posts could make purchases at cost for their personal use; by 1841, officers could also purchase items for members of their immediate families.

However, the modern era of sales commissaries is considered to have actually begun in 1867, when enlisted men received the same at-cost purchasing privileges officers had already enjoyed for four decades. No geographic restrictions were placed upon these sales; the commissary warehouse at every Army post could become a sales location, whether they were located on the frontier or near a large city. From the start, commissaries were meant to take on-post retail functions out of the hands of civilian vendors and post traders and allow the Army to "care for its own." The stores provided food beyond what was supplied in the official rations, and the savings they provided supplemented military pay. The modern concept of commissary sales stores, which were established to benefit military personnel of all ranks by providing healthful foods at cost, reached its 150th anniversary on July 1, 2017.

The commissary retail function developed and grew, roughly parallel to the development of the retail grocery industry. The commissaries’ 82-item stock list of 1868 was comparable to the stock assortment in a typical civilian dry goods grocery store at that time. Commissaries kept pace with developments in civilian supermarkets, and the average commissary today has more than 12,000 line items; the largest stores have several thousand more.

The list of eligible shoppers has also grown. Originally, only active-duty Army personnel could shop. Today, personnel in all services, including the Coast Guard and National Guard and Reserves, may shop in the commissary on any U.S. military installation, around the world. Military retirees – those who have served in uniform 20 years or more – were first allowed to make commissary purchases in 1878, and they continue to have shopping privileges. Spouses and dependent children of service personnel are authorized commissary privileges, as are recipients of the Medal of Honor, and veterans honorably discharged from service with 100% disability in connection with military service also have authorized commissary privileges.

As the role of the American military grew larger, commissaries began to spread around the world. The first overseas stores opened in Cuba, the Philippines and in China between 1898 and 1904. They were soon followed by commissaries in Panama and Puerto Rico. Eventually, all the services adopted the Army's concept of commissary sales stores and tailored the concept to their own needs. The Navy and Marine Corps opened their first commissaries in 1909 and 1910, and the Air Force inherited its stores from the Army Air Forces in 1947 and 1948. By the mid-1970s, each of the services ran its own commissary agency, with differing procedures and systems: the Army Troop Support Agency (TSA), the Navy Resale System Support Office (NAVRESSO), the Commissary Section of the Marine Corps Services Command, and the Air Force Commissary Service (AFCOMS).

== Separate systems combined ==
In 1989, Congress directed DoD to conduct a study of the separate military commissary systems. The ensuing report by the Jones Commission (headed by Army Lt. Gen. Donald E. Jones) recommended consolidating the service systems into one agency to improve service and save money. The Defense Commissary Agency (DeCA) was established May 15, 1990, by a memorandum from the deputy secretary of defense; this was the first DoD functional agency consolidation during the post-Cold War cutbacks and downsizing.

DoD appointed Army Maj. Gen. John P. Dreska as the agency's first director in June 1990. Shortly afterward, a transition team of commissary functional experts managed the consolidation of all the service systems into a single agency, and DeCA assumed full control of all commissaries on October 1, 1991, at its headquarters in Fort Lee, Va.

After leading DeCA through its initial year of operation, Dreska retired in 1992, and Army Maj. Gen. Richard E. Beale Jr. became the new director. Beale retired from the military September 30, 1996, but stayed on the job as the first civilian director of the agency. He was succeeded by Air Force Maj. Gen. Robert J. Courter Jr. (November 1999 to August 2002) and Air Force Maj. Gen. Michael P. Wiedemer (August 2002 to October 2004). Patrick B. Nixon, who served as director and CEO from October 2004 to October 2007, was the first person in U.S. history to become director of any commissary agency after beginning his career at store level and steadily rising through the commissaries' civilian career field. Following Nixon's retirement, Richard S. Page served as acting director until the arrival of director and CEO, Philip E. Sakowitz Jr., in June 2008. Thomas E. Milks was acting director and CEO, from Sakowitz's June 2010 retirement until Joseph H. Jeu succeeded Sakowitz June 3, 2011.

Joseph H. Jeu subsequently served as the director and CEO from January 2011 until his retirement in June 2017. Michael Dowling served as acting director and CEO following Jeu’s retirement. On Oct 24, DOD announced retired Rear Adm. Robert J. Bianchi as the interim director and CEO. Bianchi is also the CEO of the Navy Exchange Service Command.

== Authorized commissary patrons ==
Authority to shop at Commissaries is normally determined by presentation of the U.S. Uniformed Services Privilege and Identification Card or a Common Access Card. At some military bases authorized patrons are allowed to bring guests into the commissaries. Guests are not authorized to make commissary purchases, and patrons are not permitted to make commissary purchases for guests. Base commanders can order the restriction of guests to the commissaries.

Commissary privileges overseas are covered under Status of Forces Agreements (SOFA), Visiting Forces agreements, treaties, etc. Since products sold in overseas commissaries pass across international borders and are customs, duty, and tax free; there are shopping restrictions.

=== Authorized patrons ===
- Active duty members of the United States Armed Forces.
- DeCA employees
- Members of the Reserve and National Guard.
- Retired members of Active Duty, Reserves, and the National Guard.
- Retired Reservist and National Guardsmen not yet age 60 (Gray Area).
- Honorably discharged veterans with 100 percent service-connected disability certified by the Department of Veterans Affairs (VA).
- Recipients of the Medal of Honor.
- Since Jan 2020, Recipients of the Purple Heart.
- Since Jan 2020, Disabled Veterans 10-90 percent*.
- Since Jan 2020, Caregivers for Disabled Veterans*.
- Since Jan 2020, former POWs.

*Patron eligibility documentation required is primarily based on VA letter for caregivers and VA VID. Some newly categorized patrons receive an additional charge on top of regular Surcharge to satisfy U.S. Treasury fees to avoid a hit on taxpayers.

=== Eligible dependents ===
- Spouses of Military Servicemembers, Military Retirees, Recipients of the Medal of Honor and Veterans with 40-100 percent service-connected disability are entitled to full commissary privileges.
- Children until their military-parent leaves the service (without a full combat related disability) or they reach the age of 21 or age 23 if enrolled in college full-time.

=== Survivors ===
- Spouses of fallen service members in combat have unlimited commissary privileges.
- Unmarried children of the deceased service members in the line of duty may use commissary privileges, until they are twenty-one, or twenty-three if enrolled in a full-time course of study in a secondary school or in a full-time course of study in an institution of higher education.

=== Personal agent ===
Authorized Commissary patron may designate an agent or representative, on a temporary basis not to exceed one year, to accompany and assist an authorized patron to the commissary under the following conditions:

- In extreme hardship cases.
- When no adult dependent member is capable of shopping due to injury, illness, incapacitation or being stationed away from their household (i.e. deployment, TDY, school, training).
- Any person chosen by a blinded or other severely disabled eligible patron to assist the patron.

The personal agent will be provided official agent credentials or an approval letter, and then may enter any commissary to shop on behalf of the authorized patron. Only an installation commander can authorize agent privileges.

== Guard/Reserve On-Site Sales ==
Guard/Reserve On-Site Sales is a program that allows Guard/Reserve members and their families, and any authorized shopper living long distances from a commissary store. The sales which provide patrons significant savings; the same as active duty military personnel that shop regularly at the commissaries. Guard/Reserve On-Site Sales are held at Reserve Centers, National Guard armories and Air National Guard bases.

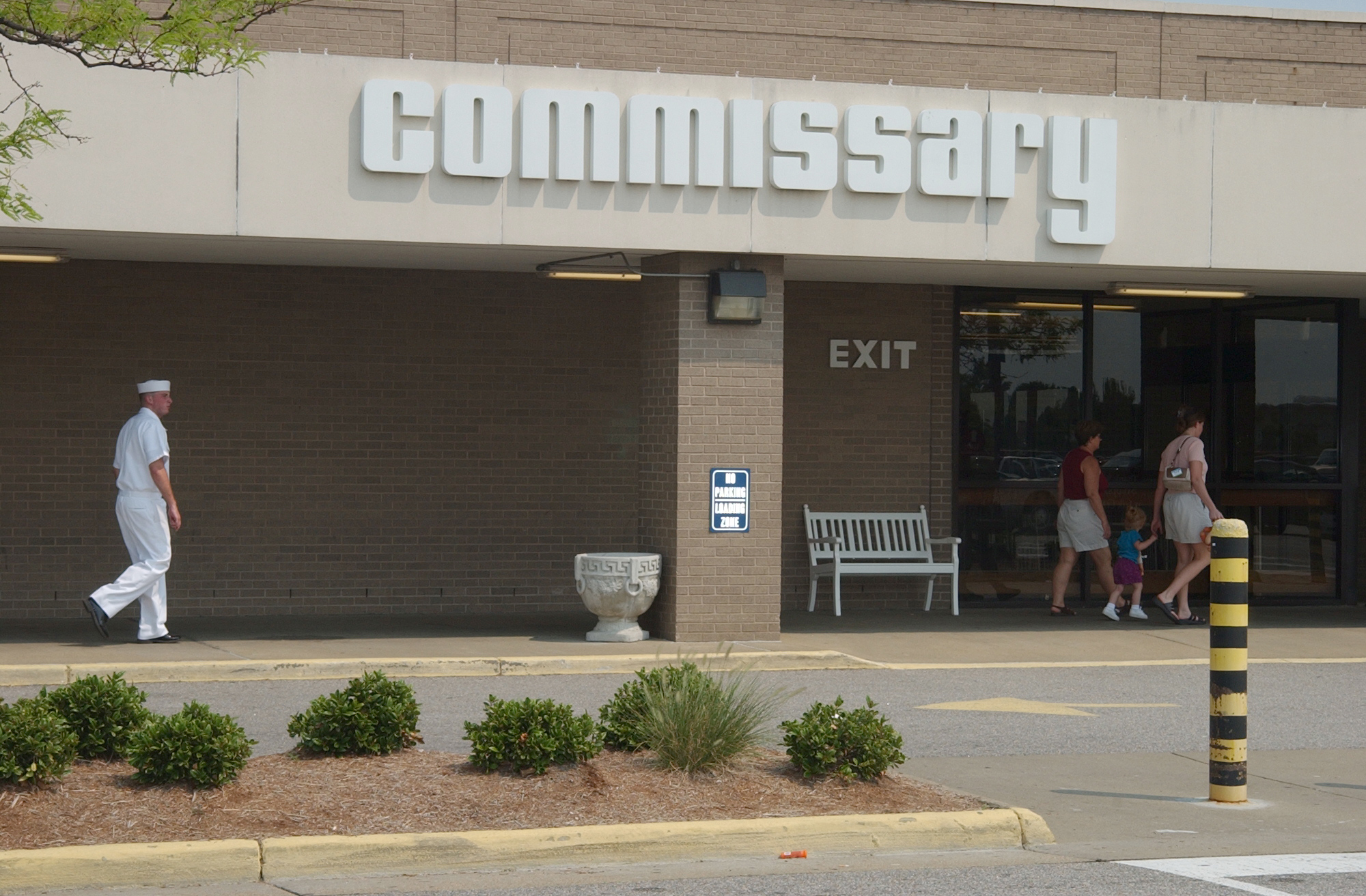
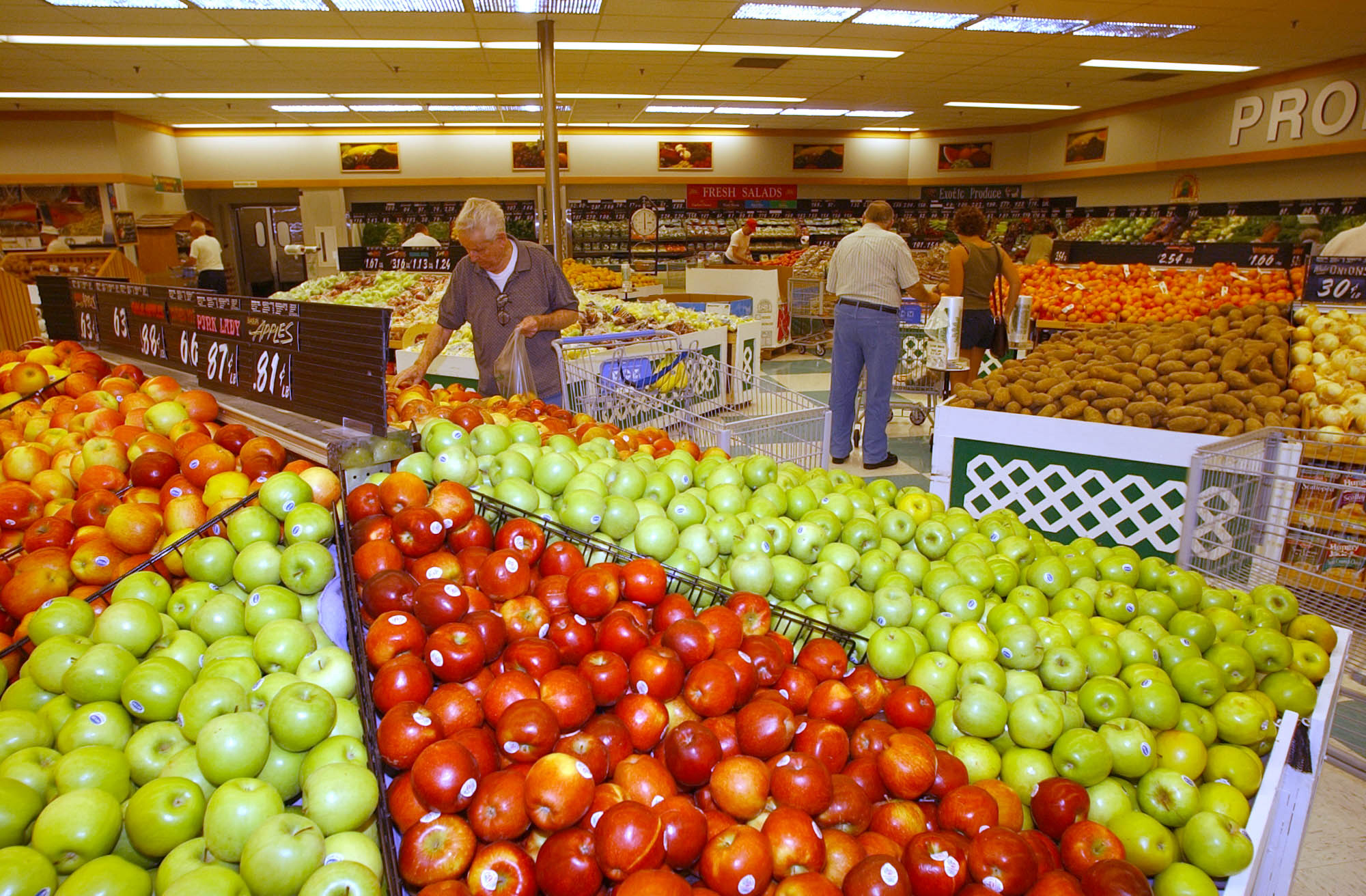
Exterior and interior views of the commissary at Naval Station Norfolk in August 2002.

== Commissaries today ==
Today's customers also pay a surcharge on their purchases, which was mandated by Congress in 1952 to make commissaries more self-sustaining. The surcharge, which has been set at 5 percent since April 1983, provides modern shopping facilities for service members at a reduced cost to taxpayers. Unlike a tax, surcharge funds go right back into the commissary to work for commissary customers, paying for the cost of building new stores, renovating and repairing existing ones and purchasing equipment and store-level information technology systems such as cash registers.

Commissary patrons worldwide save thousands of dollars annually on their grocery bills. Customers can use manufacturer's coupons to save even more on their commissary purchases. As of 2024, annual sales were nearly $5 billion.

Surveys consistently rate the commissaries as one of the military's top non-pay benefits. Many young service families, particularly those stationed in high cost-of-living urban areas, could not make ends meet without the price savings provided by the commissaries.

In 2010, DeCA estimated that it saved patrons $2.7 billion and had an operations cost of $1.3 billion. In March 2017, the United States Government Accountability Office (GAO) published a report with recommendations that DeCA update its methodology for calculating savings for patrons. As of August of that year, DeCA had implemented GAO's recommendations. However, a 2022 report by GAO found that the methodology to calculate the savings rate for commissaries outside the continental US (OCONUS) was unreliable. The report also found that DeCA was only able to achieve its goal savings rate due to the higher savings rate for OCONUS commissaries. As of 2025, GAO's recommendation to improve the OCONUS savings rate methodology had not been implemented. In 2024, DeCA estimated that it saved patrons $1.58 billion and had an operations cost of $1.7 billion, $1.5 billion of which was funded from appropriations.
