= World Basic Information Library =

World Basic Information Library, WBIL
- Fort Leavenworth, Kansas
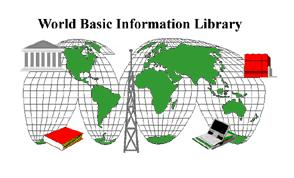
- WBIL Insignia

The World Basic Information Library (WBIL) is a joint United States Army and United States Navy program, which allows Reserve Component (RC) personnel of all United States Armed Forces branches to participate in contributing Open Source Intelligence (OSINT) information in accordance with tasking requirements from the United States Department of Defense (DoD) and the United States Intelligence Community (IC). The program is administered by the Foreign Military Studies Office (FMSO), located at Fort Leavenworth, Kansas. In order for RC personnel to be eligible to participate in the WBIL program, they must first attend a one-week training course at the FMSO taught by its Training and Education Team. The training phase of the WBIL program falls under the authority of the United States Army Training and Doctrine Command (TRADOC).

== Vision ==
The vision for the World Basic Information Library is to be a reliable open source collection and analytical tool for the Intelligence Community. The vision for the Joint Reserve Virtual Organization's (JRVO) Virtual Reserve Teams (VRT) is to be an organization for peacetime utilization of RC personnel in exploitation of open source intelligence.

== History ==
The WBIL program was first envisioned in 1996 as a means to more efficiently utilize the civilian skills of RC personnel. The program was officially launched in 1997. The primary focus of the program was originally on Individual Ready Reserve personnel of the RC by allowing unit members to work remotely and accrue points towards retirement, while supporting IC and DoD requirements. WBIL participants are not required to have security clearances to perform their collection activities. The IC and the DoD benefit from this because WBIL participants support low-level IC and DoD mission tasking, thus allowing fully cleared personnel to concentrate on high-level, mission critical tasking.

== Mission ==
The mission of the WBIL project is to collect, research and catalogue open source information documents in support of validated intelligence community and DoD requirements. This includes OSINT research and translation tasking as mission requirements dictate. The WBIL is a "virtual research library" built upon the basic information requirements of the IC and military planners. The WBIL constitutes the central data base resource under the FMSO's Open Source Information System (OSIS).

Since the WBIL's 1997 inception as a pilot project focused on Africa, it has grown extensively to include authoritative Open Source materials for selected countries worldwide as well as a broad range of transnational security topics. In the wake of the September 11 attacks on the United States, materials focusing on post-attack information requirements have been intensively added.

The intent of the WBIL is to provide analysts with selected "best sources" of information as chosen and collected by regional and functional specialists in accordance with stated IC requirements. This material seeks to answer basic questions about the military, political, economic, and infrastructure dimensions of a country, and focuses on emerging threat issues falling under six categories:

- Homeland Security
- Terrorism
- Information Operations and Warfare
- Drugs, Arms, and Alien Trafficking
- Foreign Instability
- Proliferation

== Operation ==
Upon completion the WBIL training course, participating RC personnel receive a software package from the WBIL administrators and access to a virtual private network (VPN) enabling eligible participants to submit information to the OSIS network. Information uploaded to the OSIS network is replicated on the Secure Internet Protocol Router Network (SIPRNet) and the Joint Worldwide Intelligence Communications System (JWICS).

Provided authorized participants in the WBIL program have access to the Internet, work for the WBIL may be completed at a member's home, place of employment, Reserve Center, or at a Joint Reserve Intelligence Center (JRIC).

WBIL personnel are assigned to a Virtual Team. Each Virtual Team has responsibility for collection of open source documents for a specific region, country or emerging threat issue. Each Virtual Team is led and managed by a Virtual Team Leader (VTL). Generally, Virtual Team Leaders are selected for their subject matter expertise of the designated region or emerging threat issue. Additionally, the VTL's have demonstrated a commitment to the WBIL project and an understanding of the mission and procedures for the collection of source documents.

== Acceptance and accession process ==
1. The Reservist expresses interest to the FMSO (WBIL Operations Officer).
2. WBIL Operations Officer responds.
3. Reservist completes the Online application, attaches resume and sends to the WBIL Operations Officer.
4. Copy of the On-line application and resume will be forwarded to an OSIS administrator for creation of an OSIS account.
5. OSIS account is provided to the WBIL Operations Officer.
6. WBIL Operations Officer sends the OSIS account and initial training package to new WBIL participant.
7. WBIL Admin sends request for attachment orders, DA Form 4651, to new WBIL participant, USAR only.
8. New WBIL participant signs request for attachment orders, DA Form 4651, (USAR) and returns to the WBIL Admin.
9. New WBIL participant completes the initial training package steps.
10. WBIL Admin receives request for Attachment Orders (USAR only) and forwards to USAR PERSCOM or the soldier's unit if a TPU member.
11. New WBIL personnel inform WBIL Operations Officer when they have completed the initial training steps.
12. Upon completion of the initial training package requirements, the WBIL Operations Officer and new WBIL personnel discuss and mutually determine Virtual Team assignment,.
13. New personnel assigned to a Virtual Team by the WBIL Operations Officer.
14. The Virtual Team Leader (VTL) is informed of the new personnel assignment and a copy of the individual's resume and biography sent to the VTL.
15. WBIL Operations Officer requests System Administration send an OS-mosis account to the new WBIL personnel.
16. New WBIL personnel send a completed Statement of Commitment to WBIL Operations Officer.
17. Each member of the WBIL project is assigned to a Virtual team based upon the WBIL project JRVO member's interests, skills and abilities and the needs of the WBIL project.

== Awards and recognition ==
The WBIL project administrators monitor participant progress to recognize and award superior performance and service. A Certificate of Achievement will be presented to each member upon completion of their first 100 entries and 500 entries into the WBIL library. For Superior collection and production achievement, performance and service will be recognized by the U.S. Army award system administered by the Combined Arms Center, Ft Leavenworth, KS. The Commander of the Combined Arms Center has authority for approval of the Army Achievement Medal, the Army Commendation Medal and the Meritorious Service Medal. Other awards must be approved by the Commander, US Army Training and Doctrine Command.

All personnel are eligible for awards and recognition and may recommend a member of the WBIL project, although the Virtual Team Leader is expected, as the principal supervisor, to recommend members of their team for recognition. WBIL Project participants are also eligible for recommendation and receipt of their own military service's awards in accordance with those service's regulations. The WBIL JRVO leadership will support recommendations for individual service awards.

== See also ==
- Foreign Military Studies Office
- TRADOC
