= National Defense Service Medal =

American service medal

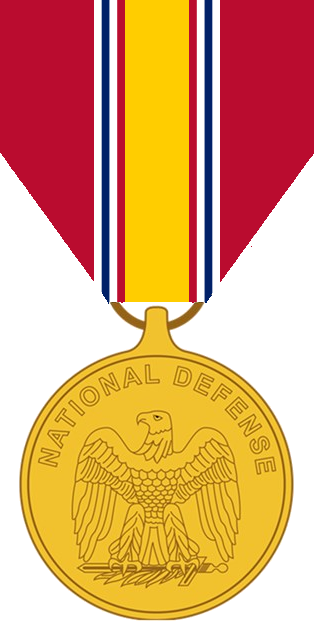
- Obverse
- Type: Military medal Service medal
- Awarded for: Military service during a time designated by the Secretary of Defense.
- Description: Obverse: Shows a North American bald eagle, perched on a sword and palm. Above this, in a semicircle, is the inscription "National Defense". Reverse: Shows a shield, taken from the coat of arms of the United States; it is half encircled below with an open wreath, the right side of oak leaves and laurel leaves the left. Ribbon: The ribbon has a wide yellow stripe in the center, flanked by narrow stripes of red, white, blue, white and wide red stripes.
- Presented by: the U.S. Department of Defense
- Eligibility: Member of the United States Armed Forces during qualifying periods of national emergency
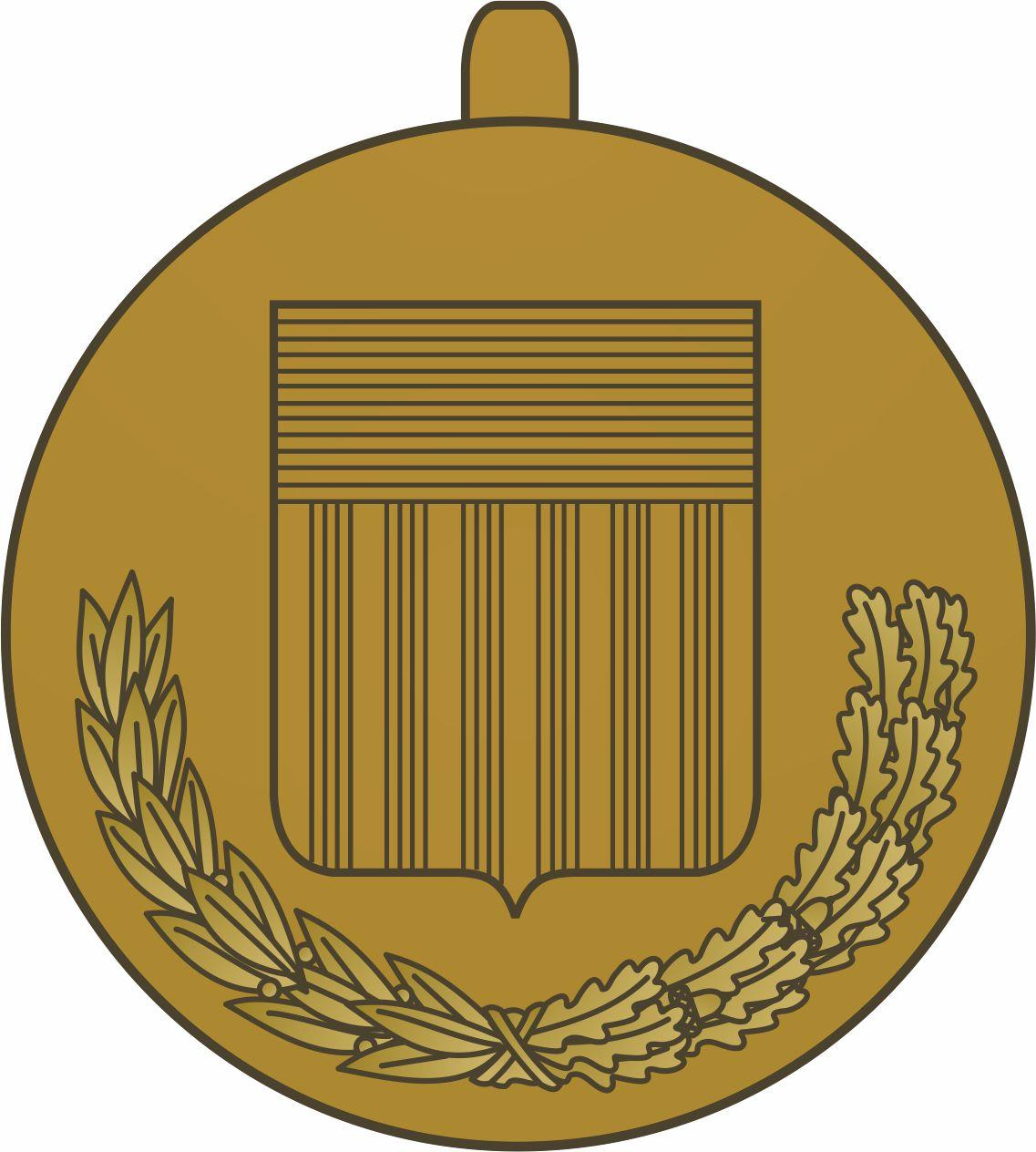
- Reverse
- Campaigns: Korean War, Vietnam War, Persian Gulf War, and the Global War on Terrorism
- Clasps: Service star for subsequent awards
- Status: Inactive
- Established: Executive Order 10448, April 22, 1953 (as amended by E.O. 11265, January 11, 1966; E.O. 12776, October 8, 1991; E.O. 13293, March 28, 2003.
- First award: April 22, 1953 – July 27, 1954 (retroactive to June 27, 1950)
- Final award: December 31, 2022
- Service ribbon and campaign streamer

Precedence
- Next (higher): Army: Army of Occupation Medal; Air Force: Medal for Humane Action; Navy: Navy Expeditionary Medal; Marine Corps: Navy Occupation Service Medal; Coast Guard: Navy Occupation Service Medal
- Next (lower): Korean Service Medal

The National Defense Service Medal (NDSM) is a service award of the United States Armed Forces established by President Dwight D. Eisenhower in 1953. It was awarded to every member of the U.S. Armed Forces who served during any one of four specified periods of armed conflict or national emergency from June 27, 1950 through December 31, 2022. Combat or "in theater" service is not a requirement for the award.

== History ==
The National Defense Service Medal (NDSM) was first intended to be a "blanket campaign medal" awarded to service members who served honorably during a designated time period of when a "national emergency" had been declared during a time of war or conflict. It may also be issued to active military members for any other period that the Secretary of Defense designates.

To date, the NDSM has been awarded for four specific time periods, which roughly correspond to the Korean War (1950–1954), Vietnam War (1961–1974), Gulf War (1990–1995), and the Global War on Terrorism (2001–2022).

=== Establishment ===
The NDSM was established by Executive Order 10448, issued by President Dwight Eisenhower, on April 22, 1953. While no document is known which explains the rationale for the award, it was apparently established to recognize all service members who served during the Korean War, to include those who did not serve in the war zone. (Service members who served in the war zone received the Korean Service Medal, established by President Harry S Truman in 1950.) Originally, awards of the NDSM were restricted to personnel serving on active duty and were retroactive to June 27, 1950 - the date the Korean War began.

=== Design ===
The Heraldic Division, Quartermaster General's Office, of the U.S. Army was requested to provide designs for the NDSM. A design developed by T. H. Jones was submitted to the U.S. Army Assistant Chief of Staff for Personnel (G1) on 26 May 1953. A committee appointed by the Department of Defense, which included representatives of all services, met on 27 May 1953 and 3 June 1953 and selected Jones' design for final approval. An eagle holding a sword and an olive branch (on the obverse), together with the shield of the Coat of Arms of the United States (on the reverse), was used to symbolize the defense of the United States. The combination of oak and palm leaves around the shield signify strength and preparedness.

=== Eligibility changes ===
Eligibility for the NDSM was expanded by executive orders issued in 1966 (EO 11265), 1991 (EO 12776) and 2003 (EO 13293).

Executive Order 11265, dated January 11, 1966, extended eligibility for the NDSM to service members "who served during any period after December 31, 1960, which the Secretary of Defense designates as being a period for which active military service merits special recognition." The closing date of this period of eligibility was later set at August 14, 1974 by a letter from the Assistant Secretary of Defense for Manpower and Reserve Affairs, subject: Termination of Eligibility for the National Defense Service Medal, dated June 30, 1974.

The NDSM was again authorized by a memorandum, dated 20 February 1991, from Secretary of Defense Dick Cheney for active service on or after 2 August 1990 with no termination date established. Executive Order 12776 of October 8, 1991 extended eligibility for the NDSM to members of the Reserve Components during the period of the Gulf War. This eligibility period was later defined as from August 2, 1990 to November 30, 1995.

A memorandum from the Office of the Deputy Secretary of Defense, dated April 26, 2002, authorized the reinstatement of the NDSM for all active duty personnel retroactive to September 11, 2001. Executive Order 13293, dated March 28, 2003, amended EO 10448 to extend eligibility to all Selected Reserve personnel (i.e. actively drilling members of the reserve components to include the National Guard). As EO 13293 amended the EO which established the NDSM, this made Selected Reserve personnel from all previous eligibility periods eligible for the NDSM, to include those who served during the Korean and Vietnam eras.

On August 30, 2022, Secretary of Defense Lloyd Austin issued a memorandum stating that issue of the NDSM would be suspended after December 31, 2022.

=== Status ===
The National Defense Service Medal is the oldest service medal (as opposed to decorations for particular achievements such as valor or meritorious service and Good Conduct Medals) awarded by all branches of the United States Armed Forces. The only two older awarded service medals are the Marine Corps Expeditionary Medal, established in 1919, and the Navy Expeditionary Medal, established in 1936. The oldest awarded combat decoration is the Medal of Honor, which was established in 1862, and the oldest awarded non-combat decoration is the Army's Distinguished Service Medal, established in 1918. The Navy, Marine Corps, Coast Guard and Army Good Conduct Medals were established in 1869, 1896, 1923 and 1941 respectively. The Selected Marine Corps Reserve Medal was established in 1925.

As the NDSM has been awarded to all military personnel during four wartime periods spanning 72 years, it has millions of recipients and is the most widely awarded medal in the history of the United States Armed Forces.

== Periods of eligibility ==
The National Defense Service Medal is authorized for all active duty and Selected Reserve United States military personnel, regardless of length of service, with no requirement for overseas or combat service, for the following time periods:

Era	From	To
Korean War	June 27, 1950	July 27, 1954
Vietnam War	January 1, 1961	August 14, 1974
Persian Gulf War	August 2, 1990	November 30, 1995
Global War on Terrorism	September 11, 2001	December 31, 2022

== Award criteria ==
The National Defense Service Medal (NDSM) is awarded to anyone who has served on active duty, or as an active reservist, in the United States Armed Forces during any of four specified time periods. Originally, reserve component service during the Korean and Vietnam periods of eligibility, other than those Reserve Component personnel in a full-time status or on active duty greater than 89 days, did not qualify for award of the NDSM. This was changed by Executive Order 13293, signed on 28 March 2003, to include Selected Reserve personnel (i.e. drilling reservists) during all periods of eligibility.

For service in the Persian Gulf War, members of the Reserve Components, to include the National Guard, were initially awarded the NDSM when called to active duty service, but this was later expanded to include all members of the Reserve or National Guard in good standing in the Selected Reserve during the eligibility period.

For service in the Global War on Terrorism, Selected Reserve and National Guard members need only to have been in good standing to receive the NDSM and no active duty service is required. Inactive Ready Reserve and Retired Reserve are not eligible to be awarded the NDSM unless called to active duty.

The medal is authorized to cadets and midshipmen at the military service academies after they are sworn into service, as well as pre-commission officer candidates/trainees at the Officer Candidate Schools or Officer Training Schools of the various U.S. Armed Forces; but is not granted to discharged or retired military personnel who did not serve in one of the above time periods; nor is it authorized for Reserve Officer Training Corps cadets and midshipmen at colleges and universities who enlisted in the inactive reserve (i.e., Obligated Reserve Section or ORS) during qualifying periods.

The NDSM ranks fourth out of twenty-nine in the order of precedence of service medals. There is no time requirement for the medal's issuance, meaning that someone who joins the United States Armed Forces for simply a few days, and then receives an entry-level discharge, would technically be entitled to the NDSM; in practice, however, military clerks will not add the NDSM on a DD Form 214 if the service member performed duty for less than 90 days from the completion of their initial entry training. This accounts for the medal's omission from many "uncharacterized" and "entry level" separation documents. Veterans who have this medal so omitted may apply to the military service departments to have the NDSM added to records via a DD Form 215.

== Additional awards ==
Additional awards of the National Defense Service Medal are authorized for members of the military who served in more than one of the eligible time periods. Each additional award is denoted by a 3/16-inch bronze service star attached to the ribbon. A second award of the medal is not granted for reenlisting during the same time period or transferring between branches of service.

Starting in 1966, when the NDSM was authorized for service in the Vietnam era, members of the U.S. Army who had received two NDSMs (i.e. for both the Korean and Vietnam eras), wore an oak leaf cluster on the ribbon, rather than a star (as was done by the other branches of service).

Recipients of three NDSMs are uncommon, having served for at least 27 years (1974 to 2001) or 36 years (1954 to 1990) to qualify for a third medal. A recipient of the maximum of four NDSMs would have a career exceeding 47 years, inclusive of the years 1954 to 2001 (broken service would qualify).

NDSM ribbons with 3/16 inch bronze stars

First award: service ribbon only
Second award: one 3/16-inch bronze star
Third award: two 3/16-inch bronze stars
Fourth award: three 3/16-inch bronze stars

== See also ==
- American Defense Service Medal
- Global War on Terrorism Service Medal
- Korean Service Medal
- Southwest Asia Service Medal
- Vietnam Service Medal
