= The Bear Went Over the Mountain =

The Bear Went Over the Mountain may refer to:

- The Bear Went Over the Mountain (novel), by William Kotzwinkle
- "The Bear Went Over the Mountain", a short story by Alice Munro
- The Bear Went Over the Mountain (1996 book), by Lester Grau
- "The Bear Went Over the Mountain" (song), a traditional children's song
