= Ready Reserve =

U.S. Department of Defense program

The Ready Reserve is a U.S. Department of Defense program which maintains a pool of trained service members that may be recalled to active duty should the need arise. It is composed of service members that are contracted to serve in the Ready Reserve for a specified period of time as a reservist or in active duty status. Members of the Ready Reserve are required to be prepared for mobilization or re-activation within a specified period of time, maintain a serviceable uniform, and maintain a degree of fitness.

Each of the reserve components of the United States Armed Forces is divided into the Ready Reserve, Standby Reserve, and the Retired Reserve.

== Composition ==
The Ready Reserve is divided into three programs:

1. The Selected Reserve,
2. The Individual Ready Reserve, and in the case of the National Guard,
3. The Inactive National Guard.

== Legal basis ==
The Ready Reserve is prescribed by law in Title 10 of the United States Code "ARMED FORCES", Subtitle E "Reserve Components", chapter 1209. Specific provisions for creation of the Ready Reserve can be found in sections § 12301(a) and § 12302. Other sections describe rules for recall to Active Duty (§§ 12301(d), 12303, 12304) and suspension of retirement or separation (§ 12305).

== See also ==
- Ready Reserve Force
- Reserve component of the Armed Forces of the United States
- Selected Reserve
- Stop-loss policy
- United States Army Reserve
- United States Navy Reserve
- United States Public Health Service Commissioned Corps Ready Reserve Corps
