= Common Access Card =

Standard identification for Active Duty United States Defense personnel

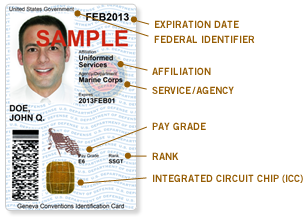
A Common Access Card (CAC).

The common access card, also commonly referred to as the CAC (kak), is the standard identification for active duty United States defense personnel. The card itself is a smart card about the size of a credit card. Defense personnel that use the CAC include the Selected Reserve and National Guard, United States Department of Defense (DoD) civilian employees, United States Coast Guard (USCG) civilian employees and eligible DoD and USCG contractor personnel. It is also the principal card used to enable physical access to buildings and controlled spaces, and it provides access to defense computer networks and systems. It also serves as an identification card under the Geneva Conventions (especially the Third Geneva Convention). In combination with a personal identification number, a CAC satisfies the requirement for two-factor authentication: something the user knows combined with something the user has. The CAC also satisfies the requirements for digital signature and data encryption technologies: authentication, integrity and non-repudiation.

The CAC is a controlled item. DoD has deployed an issuance infrastructure at over 1,000 sites in more than 25 countries around the world and rolled out more than one million card readers and associated middleware as of July 2002. As of 2026, DoD has a new card named the Uniformed Services Identification (USID) card.

== Issuance ==
The CAC is issued to active United States Armed Forces (Regular, Reserves and National Guard) in the Department of Defense and the U.S. Coast Guard; DoD civilians; USCG civilians; non-DoD/other government employees and State Employees of the National Guard; and eligible DoD and USCG contractors who need access to DoD or USCG facilities and/or DoD computer network systems:

- Active Duty U.S. Armed Forces (to include Cadets and Midshipmen of the U.S. Service Academies)
- Reserve members of the U.S. Armed Forces
- National Guard (Army National Guard and Air National Guard) members of the U.S. Armed Forces
- National Oceanic and Atmospheric Administration
- National Aeronautics and Space Administration
- United States Public Health Service
- Emergency-Essential Employees
- Contingency Contractor Employees
- Contracted college & university ROTC Cadets and Midshipmen
- Deployed Overseas Civilians
- Non-Combatant Personnel
- DoD/Uniformed Service Civilians residing on military installations in CONUS, Hawaii, Alaska, Puerto Rico, or Guam
- DoD/Uniformed Service Civilians or Contracted Civilian residing in a foreign country for at least 365 days
- Presidential Appointees approved by the United States Senate
- DoD Civilian employees, and United States Military veterans with a Veterans Affairs Disability rating of 100% P&T
- Eligible DoD and USCG Contractor Employees
- Non-DoD/other government and state employees of the National Guard

Future plans include the ability to store additional information through the incorporation of RFID chips or other contactless technology to allow seamless access to DoD facilities.

The program that is currently used to issue CAC IDs is called the Real-Time Automated Personnel Identification System (RAPIDS). RAPIDS interfaces with the Joint Personnel Adjudication System (JPAS), and uses this system to verify that the candidate has passed a background investigation and FBI fingerprint check. Applying for a CAC requires DoD form 1172-2 to be filled out and then filed with RAPIDS.

The system is secure and monitored by the DoD at all times. Different RAPIDS sites have been set up throughout military installations in and out of combat theater to issue new cards.

== Design ==
On the front of the card, the background shows the phrase "U.S. DEPARTMENT OF DEFENSE" repeated across the card. A color photo of the cardholder is placed on the top left corner. Below the photo is the name of the cardholder. The top right corner displays the expiration date. Other information on the front includes (if applicable) the holders's: pay grade, rank, and federal identifier. A PDF417 stacked barcode is displayed on the bottom left corner. An integrated circuit chip (ICC) is placed near the bottom-middle of the front of the card.

There are three color code schemes used on the front of the CAC. A blue bar across the holder’s name shows that the cardholder is a non-U.S. citizen. A green bar shows that the cardholder is a contractor. Absence of a bar indicates all other personnel—including military personnel and civil workers, among others.

The back of the card has a ghost image of the cardholder. If applicable, the card also contains the date of birth, blood type, DoD benefits number, Geneva Convention category, and DoD Identification Number of the holder (also used as the Geneva Convention number, replacing the previously used Social Security Number). The DoD number is also known as the Electronic data interchange Personal Identifier (EDIPI). A Code 39 barcode and a magnetic strip are at the top and bottom of the card, respectively. The cardholder’s DoD ID/EDIPI number is permanent throughout his or her career with the DoD or USCG, regardless of department or division. Likewise, the permanent number follows retired U.S. military personnel who subsequently become DoD or USCG civilians or DoD or USCG contractors needing a card. Additionally, for non-military spouses, unremarried former spouses, and widows/widowers of active, Reserve or Retired U.S. military personnel who themselves become DoD or USCG civilians or DoD or USCG contractors, the DoD ID/EDIPI Number on their CAC will be the same as on their DD 1173 Uniformed Services Privilege and Identification Card (e.g., Dependent ID card).

The front of the CAC is fully laminated, while the back is only laminated in the lower half (to avoid interference with the magnetic stripe).

The CAC is said to be resistant to identity fraud, tampering, counterfeiting, and exploitation and provides an electronic means of rapid authentication.

There are currently four different variants of CACs. The Geneva Conventions Identification Card is the most common CAC and is given to active duty/reserve armed forces and uniformed service members. The Geneva Convention Accompany Forces Card is issued to emergency-essential civilian personnel. The ID and Privilege Common Access Card is for civilians residing on military installations. The ID card is for DOD/Government Agency identification for civilian employees.

== Encryption ==
Until 2008, all CACs were encrypted using 1,024-bit encryption. Starting 2008, the DoD switched to 2,048-bit encryption. Personnel with the older CACs had to get new CACs by the deadline. On October 1, 2012, all certificates encrypted with less than 2,048-bits were placed on revocation status, rendering legacy CACs useless except for visual identification.

== Usage ==
The CAC is designed to provide two-factor authentication: what you have (the physical card) and what you know (the PIN). This CAC technology allows for rapid authentication, and enhanced physical and logical security. The card can be used in a variety of ways.

=== Visual identification ===
The CAC can be used for visual identification by way of matching the color photo with the owner. This is used for when the user passes through a guarded gate, or purchases items from a store, such as a PX/BX that require a level of privileges to use the facility. Some states allow the CAC to be used as a government-issued ID card, such as for voting or applying for a drivers license.

=== Magnetic stripe ===
The magnetic stripe can be read by swiping the card through a magnetic stripe reader, much like a credit card. The magnetic stripe is actually blank when the CAC is issued. However, its use is reserved for localized physical security systems. The magnetic stripe was removed first quarter 2018.

=== Integrated circuit chip (ICC) ===
The integrated circuit chip (ICC) contains information about the owner, including the PIN and one or more PKI digital certificates. The ICC comes in different capacities, with the more recent versions issued at 64 and 144 kilobytes (KB).

The CAC can be used for access into computers and networks equipped with one or more of a variety of smartcard readers. Once inserted into the reader, the device asks the user for a PIN. Once the PIN is entered, the PIN is matched with the stored PIN on the CAC. If successful, the EDIPI number is read off the ID certificate on the card, and then sent to a processing system where the EDIPI number is matched with an access control system, such as Active Directory or LDAP. The DoD standard is that after three incorrect PIN attempts, the chip on the CAC will lock.

The EDIPI number is stored in a PKI certificate. Depending on the owner, the CAC contains one or three PKI certificates. If the CAC is used for identification purposes only, an ID certificate is all that is needed. However, in order to access a computer, sign a document, or encrypt email, signature and encryption certificates are also required.

A CAC works in virtually all modern computer operating systems. Besides the reader, drivers and middleware are also required in order to read and process a CAC. The only approved Microsoft Windows middleware for CAC is ActivClient—available only to authorized DoD personnel. Other non-Windows alternatives include LPS-Public—a non-hard drive based solution.

DISA now requires all DoD-based intranet sites to provide user authentication by way of a CAC in order to access the site. Authentication systems vary depending on the type of system, such as Active Directory, RADIUS, or other access control list.

CAC is based on X.509 certificates with software middleware enabling an operating system to interface with the card via a hardware card reader. Although card manufacturers such as Schlumberger provided a suite of smartcard, hardware card reader and middleware for both Linux and Windows, not all other CAC systems integrators did likewise. In an attempt to correct this situation, Apple Federal Systems has done work for adding some support for Common Access Cards to their later Snow Leopard operating system updates out of the box using the MUSCLE (Movement for the Use of Smartcards in a Linux Environment) project. The procedure for this was documented historically by the Naval Postgraduate School in the publication "CAC on a Mac" although today the school uses commercial software. According to the independent military testers and help desks, not all cards are supported by the open source code associated with Apple's work, particularly the recent CACNG or CAC-NG PIV II CAC cards. Third party support for CAC Cards on the Mac are available from vendors such as Centrify and Thursby Software. Apple's Federal Engineering Management suggest not using the out-of-the-box support in Mac OS X 10.6 Snow Leopard but instead supported third party solutions. Mac OS X 10.7 Lion has no native smart card support. Thursby's PKard for iOS software extends CAC support to Apple iPads and iPhones. Some work has also been done in the Linux realm. Some users are using the MUSCLE project combined with Apple's Apple Public Source Licensed Common Access Card software. Another approach to solve this problem, which is now well documented, involves the use of a new project, CoolKey, to gain Common Access Card functionality. This document is available publicly from the Naval Research Laboratory's Ocean Dynamics and Predictions Branch.

=== Bar codes ===
The CAC has two types of bar codes: PDF417 in the front and Code 39 in the rear.

==== PDF417 Sponsor Barcode ====
Example value	Field name	Size	Description
"IDUS"	Identification Code	4	Sponsor/Dependent card
"3"	Bar Code Version	1	
XX	PDF417 Size	2	
X	PDF417 Checksum	1	
X	PDF417 RSize	1	
"1"	Sponsor flag	1	1=Sponsor; 0=Dependent
"GREATHOUSE, TUYET"	Name	27	Last, First
"999100096"	Person Designator Identifier	9	999-10-0096
"1"	Family sequence number	1	
" "	Reserved for future use	9	
"00"	DEERS dependent suffix		Sponsor v3
"60"	Height (inches)	2	5' 0"
"150"	Weight (pounds)	3	150 lbs
"RD"	Hair Color	2	BK=Black; BR=Brown; BD=Blonde; RD=Red; GY=Gray; WH=White; BA=Bald; OT=Other
"BR"	Eye Color	2	BK=Black; BR=Brown; HZ=Hazel; BL=Blue; GY=Gray; GR=Green; OT=Other
"1992OCT31"	Date of birth	9	19921031
"S"	Direct Care Flag	1	S=Unlimited
"M"	CHAMPUS Flag	1	M=Civilian Health Care CHAMPUS
"Y"	Comissary flag	1	Y=Eligible and active
"Y"	MWR flag	1	Y=Eligible and active
"U"	Exchange flag	1	U=Unlimited
"2011OCT31"	CHAMPUS Effective Date	9	20111031
"2057SEP30"	CHAMPUS Expiration Date	9	20570930
"2RET "	Form number	6	DD Form 2 - Retired
"2011NOV04"	Card Issue Date	9	20111104
"INDEF "	Card Expiration Date	9	Indefinite
"8 "	Card Security Code	4	
"H"	Service/Component Code	1	
"RET "	Status	6	RET=Retired member entitled to retired pay
"USA "	Branch of service	5	USA=U.S. Army
"PVT "	Rank	6	PVT=Private
"E2 "	Pay grade	4	
"I "	Geneva Convention Code	3	
"UNK"	Blood Type	3	

==== PDF417 Dependent Barcode ====
Example value	Field name	Size	Description
"IDUS"	Identification Code	4	Sponsor/Dependent card
...	...	...	...
"0"	Sponsor flag	1	1=Sponsor 0=Dependent
...	...	...	...
"RET "	Sponsor Status	6	RET=Retired member entitled to retired pay
"USA "	Sponsor Branch of service	5	USA=U.S. Army
"PVT "	Sponsor Rank	6	PVT=Private
"E2 "	Sponsor Pay grade	4	
" TRUMBOLD, ERIC "	Sponsor Name	27	
"999100096"	Sponsor Person Designator Identifier	9	
"CH"	Relationship	2	SP=Spouse CH=Child

=== RFID technology ===
There are also some security risks in RFID. To prevent theft of information in RFID, in November 2010, 2.5 million radio frequency shielding sleeves were delivered to the DoD, and another roughly 1.7 million more were to be delivered the following January 2011. RAPIDS ID offices worldwide are required to issue a sleeve with every CAC. When a CAC is placed in a holder along with other RFID cards, it can also cause problems, such as attempting to open a door with an access card when it is in the same holder as a CAC. Despite these challenges at least one civilian organization, NOAA, uses the RFID technology to access facilities nationwide. Access is usually granted after first removing the CAC from the RF shield and then holding it against a reader either mounted on a wall or located on a pedestal. Once the CAC is authenticated to a local security server either the door will release or a signal will be displayed to security guards to grant access to the facility.

== Common problems ==
The ICC is fragile and regular wear can make the card unusable. Older cards tend to de-laminate with repeated insertion/removal from readers, but this problem appears to be less significant with the newer (PIV-compliant) cards. Also, the gold contacts on the ICC can become dirty and require cleaning with either solvents or a rubber pencil eraser.

Fixing or replacing a CAC typically requires access to a RAPIDS facility, causing some practical problems. In remote locations around the world without direct Internet access or physical access to a RAPIDS facility, a CAC is rendered useless if the card expires, or if the maximum number of re-tries of the PIN is reached. Based on the regulations for CAC use, a user on TAD / TDY must visit a RAPIDS facility to replace or unlock a CAC, usually requiring travel to another geographical location or even returning to one's home location. The CAC PMO has also created a CAC PIN Reset workstation capable of resetting a locked CAC PIN.

For some DoD networks, Active Directory (AD) is used to authenticate users. Access to the computer's parent Active Directory is required when attempting to authenticate with a CAC for a given computer for the first time. Use of, for example a field-replaced laptop computer that was not prepared with the user's CAC before shipment would be impossible to use without some form of direct access to Active Directory beforehand. Other remedies include establishing contact with the intranet by using public broadband Internet and then VPN to the intranet, or even satellite Internet access via a VSAT system when in locations where telecommunications is not available, such as in a natural disaster location.

== See also ==
- Access badge
- Credential
- Electronic Data Interchange Personal Identifier
- FIPS 201 (PIV)
- Identity document
- Keycard
- Magnetic stripe card
- Physical security
- Proximity card
- Swipe card
- Transportation Worker Identification Credential
- United States Uniformed Services Privilege and Identification Card
