= Standby Reserve =

The Standby Reserve consists of personnel of the United States Armed Forces who maintain their affiliation without being in the Ready Reserve. The Standby Reserve consists of two components: the Active Status List and the Inactive Status List.

== Purpose ==
For officers who do not choose whether or not to stay in the Active Reserve, membership in the Standby Reserve is limited to one year, after which they must determine if they are transferring to the Individual Ready Reserve, or to a drilling unit. The Standby Reserve is also used for personnel who have been designated key civilian employees, or who have a temporary hardship or disability. As such, they are not required to perform training and are not a part of units, but create a pool of trained individuals who could be mobilized if necessary as a last resort to fill manpower needs in specific skills.

== Organization ==
=== Active Status ===
Personnel in the Active Status List are those Standby Reservists temporarily assigned for hardship or other cogent reasons; those not having fulfilled their military service obligation (MSO), or those retained in active status when provided for by law; or those members of Congress and others identified by their employers as “key personnel” and who have been removed from the Ready Reserve because they are critical to the national security in their civilian employment.

=== Inactive Status ===
Personnel in the Inactive Status List are those Standby Reservists who are not required by law or regulation to remain in an active program and who retain their reserve affiliation in a non-participating status, and those who have skills which may be of possible future use to the Armed Forces.

== See also ==
- Reserve components of the United States Armed Forces
- Armed Forces of the United States
- Individual Ready Reserve
- Inactive National Guard
