= List of U.S. aircraft losses to missiles during the Vietnam War =

During the Vietnam War, the U.S. confirmed 206 aircraft lost to North Vietnamese surface-to-air missiles.

However, some of the U.S. aircraft "crashed in flight accidents", in fact, were lost to S-75 missiles. When landing at an airfield in Thailand, one B-52 was heavily damaged by a SAM, rolled off the runway and exploded on mines that had been installed around the airfield for protection from enemy attacks; only one crewman survived. Subsequently, this B-52 was counted as "crashed in flight accidents". According to Dana Drenkowski and Lester W. Grau, the number of U.S. aircraft lost, confirmed by the U.S. is uncorroborated since the U.S. figures are also suspect. If a plane was badly damaged, but managed to land, the USAF did not normally count it as an aerial combat loss, even if it was too damaged to fly again.

During the Vietnam war, the Soviet Union deployed missile operators along with 95 S-75 systems and 7,658 missiles to the North Vietnamese. From 1965 thru 1967 Soviet missilemen downed nearly 50 U.S. attack or reconnaissance jet aircraft. 6,806 missiles were launched or removed because they were outdated (including 5,800 launches). In total, the U.S. lost 3,374 fixed wing aircraft in combat during the war; in both North and South Vietnam. According to the North Vietnamese, 31% were shot down by S-75 missiles (1,046 aircraft, or 6 missiles per one kill); 60% were shot down by anti-aircraft guns; and 9% were shot down by MiG fighters. The S-75 missile system significantly improved the effectiveness of North Vietnamese anti-aircraft artillery, which used data from S-75 radar stations

The following is a list of 205 U.S. aircraft lost to surface-to-air missiles during the Vietnam War (confirmed by the U.S.)

Vietnam War: Summary of U.S. fixed-wing aircraft (excluding allied aircraft) Lost to SAMs by year, 1965–1973.
Year / aircraft / totals	SAM type	Altitude struck: low to high in feet
1965
F-4B, F-4C Phantom II (4)	SA-2	11,000 to 23,000
F-8E Crusader (2)	SA-2	30,000 to 33,000
F-105D Thunderchief (3)	SA-2	4,000 to 18,000
A-4E Skyhawk (1)	SA-2	9,000
A-6A Intruder (1)	SA-2	4,000
RA-5C Vigilante (2)	SA-2	1,500 and 3,200
Year total: 13
1966
F-4B, F-4C Phantom II (8)	SA-2	4,000 to 25,000
F-8E Crusader (2)	SA-2	6,000 and 12,000
RF-101C Voodoo (3)	SA-2	7,000 (2 unknown)
F-105D, F-105F Thunderchief (5)	SA-2	6,000 to 16,000
F-104C Starfighter (3)	SA-2	4,000 to 10,000
A-1H Skyraider (2)	SA-2	1,000 and 7,500
A-4C Skyhawk (8)	SA-2	4,000 to 12,000 (3 unknown)
RB-66C Destroyer (2)	SA-2	29,000 and 30,000
EF-10B Skynight (1)	SA-2	Unknown
RA-5C Vigilante (1)	SA-2	3,000
Year total: 35
1967
F-4B, F-4C, RF-4C, F-4D Phantom II (14)	SA-2	1,500 to 24,000 (1 unknown)
F-8C, F-8E Crusader (4)	SA-2	1,500 15,500
RF-101C Voodoo (2)	SA-2	18,000 to 30,000
F-105D, F-105F Thunderchief (15)	SA-2	6,000 to 19,000 (1 unknown)
A-4C, A-4F Skyhawk (21)	SA-2	1,200 to 17,000 (1 unknown)
A-6A Intruder (3)	SA-2	3,500 to 12,000
A-7A Corsair II (1)	SA-2	15,000
EB-66 Destroyer (1)	SA-2	30,000
O-1 Bird Dog (1)	SA-2	8,000
Year total: 62
1968
F-4D, F-4J Phantom II (2)	SA-2	2,600 and 15,000
F-8E Crusader (2)	SA-2	5,000 and 15,000
F-105D, F-105F Thunderchief (2)	SA-2	8,000 and 12,000
A-4C, A-4E Skyhawk (2)	SA-2	11,000 and 12,000
A-6A, A-6B Intruder (3)	SA-2	5,000 and 15,000 (1 unknown)
A-7A Corsair II (1)	SA-2	10,000
Year total: 12
1970
F-105G Thunderchief (1)	SA-2	unknown
Year total: 1
1971
F-4B, F-4D, F-4E Phantom II (4)	SA-2	18,000 and 20,000 (2 unknown)
F-105G Thunderchief (1)	SA-2	18,000
O-2 Skymaster (1)	SA-2	7,000
A-6A Intruder (1)	SA-2	12,000
Year total: 7
1972
F-4D, F-4E, F-4J, RF-4C Phantom II (20)	SA-2	3,500 to 21,000 (5 unknown)
F-8J Crusader (1)	SA-2	11,000
F-105G Thunderchief (4)	SA-2	11,000 and 19,000 (2 unknown)
A-1E, A-1H, A-1G Skyraider (3)	SA-7	3,500/5,500/6,500
A-6A Intruder (1)	SA-2	13,000
A-7A, A-7B, A-7C, A-7E Corsair II (13)	SA-2	1,000 to 19,000 (2 unknown)
TA-4F Skyhawk (1)	SA-2	4,500
RA-5C Vigilante (1)	SA-2	3,000
EB-66C Destroyer (1)	SA-2	24,000
AC-130A Spectre (2)	SA-2/SA-7	8,500 (SA-7 unknown)
O-1 Bird Dog (2)	SA-7	4,000 (second SA-7 unknown)
O-2 Skymaster (2)	SA-2/SA-7	Unknown
OV-10A Bronco (5)	SA-2/SA-7	5,000; unknown;5,000/SA-7 6,500
(10) B-52D, (6) B-52G Stratofortress (16)	SA-2	25,000 to 38,500
Year total: 72
1973
B-52D Stratofortress(1)	SA-2	Unknown
A-6A Intruder (1)	SA-2	Unknown
OV-10A Bronco (1)	SA-7	6,000
UH-1H (1)	SA-7	3,200
Year total: 4
War total: 206
