= Foreign Military Studies Office =

Analysis center for U.S. Army

Coordinates: 39°21′05″N 94°54′54″W

The Foreign Military Studies Office, or FMSO, is a research and analysis center for the United States Army that is part of the United States Army Combined Arms Center at Fort Leavenworth. It manages the Joint Reserve Intelligence Center there.

== Mission ==
The main purpose of FMSO is to conduct analysis relating to foreign military and security studies based upon open source research. FMSO's publications are available on its web site, and its researchers publish in many professional military and academic journals, where their products can be assessed in the market place of ideas. Originally created by LTG William Richardson, TRADOC Commander, as the Soviet Army Studies Office in 1986, SASO's first director was Dr. Bruce Menning. It drew inspiration from the British Soviet Studies Research Centre created at Sandhurst in the 1970s. A primary area of focus was the development of operational art in the Soviet Union. Colonel David Glantz, a well-known author on the Soviet military experience in the Second World War, became its second director. FMSO was staffed by US Army foreign area officers and civilian scholars. With the end of the Cold War SASO became FMSO in 1991 and its focus initially broadened to Central and Eastern Europe. The FMSO also includes the Global Cultural Knowledge Network (GCKN) which provides the Army with valuable research information and analysis.

FMSO was actively involved in research on the end of the Cold War, the challenge of ethno-nationalism to Post-Cold War Europe, and relevant foreign military experience, such as the Soviet-Afghan War and the Wars in Chechnya. FMSO developed a research programs on Latin American military affairs, Chinese military studies, and Eurasian military studies. In the post Cold War era FMSO did address problems of asymmetric warfare. In the last decade it has also addressed the problem of integrating cultural insights into COIN and played a key role in the initial development of the Human Terrain System, and is an active partner of the controversial cultural geography mapping project called México Indígena.

The FMSO publishes the monthly OE Watch magazine online, as well as its research projects, which are all open to the public. It also provides fellowship programs each year.

Through the site, the US government made publicly available the Operation Iraqi Freedom Documents - some 55,000 boxes of documents, audiotapes and videotapes relating to the government of Saddam Hussein, seized during the Iraq invasion in 2003 for the purposes of Document Exploitation (DOCEX). However, in early November 2006, the entire set of documents was apparently removed. Media reports stated that the website was taken offline because the documents included sophisticated diagrams and other information detailing nuclear weapon design that could be useful to anyone wishing to construct a nuclear weapon.

== Members ==
- Ray Finch, Eurasian Military Analyst
- Timothy L. Thomas, Senior Analyst
- Lester W. Grau, Senior Analyst
- Matthew Stein, Eurasian Security Analyst

== See also ==
- Intelligence collection management
- List of intelligence gathering disciplines
- Document Exploitation (DOCEX)
- World Basic Information Library (WBIL)
