= Real-Time Automated Personnel Identification System =

US Department of Defense identification system

The Real-Time Automated Personnel Identification System (RAPIDS) is a United States Department of Defense (DoD) system used to issue the definitive credential within DoD. RAPIDS uses information stored in the DoD Defense Enrollment Eligibility Reporting System (DEERS) when providing these credentials. Used together, these two systems are commonly referred to as a DEERS/RAPIDS system or DEERS/RAPIDS infrastructure.

== Objectives ==
RAPIDS performs the following functions:

1. Authenticating individuals
2. Capturing unique identifying characteristics
3. Providing a distinct identification credential

=== Authenticating individuals ===
RAPIDS ensures that DoD identification credentials are provided only to personnel with a current and appropriate affiliation with the DoD

=== Capture unique identifying characteristics ===
RAPIDS captures identifying characteristics that are unique and are used to bind an individual to the information maintained in DEERS and in line with the identifying credentials issued by RAPIDS. These include, but are not limited to:

- Photographs
- Fingerprints

The information is stored solely in the DEERS System. Other redundant systems or repositories shall not be utilized without compelling justification for their need.

=== Providing a distinct identification credential ===
RAPIDS provides distinct identification that is used as proof of identity and DoD affiliation. It may be used as a Geneva Convention ID in accordance with DoD Instruction 1000.13. It also acts as the United States Uniformed Services Privilege and Identification Card to access benefits and privileges, such as usage of the commissary on military installations or receiving healthcare.

== Additional Information and Links ==
DD FORM 1172-2, FEB 2011, Application for Uniformed Services Identification Card/DEERS Enrollment
DoD Directive 1000.25 - DoD Personnel Identity Protection (PIP) Program
