= Active Guard Reserve =

US military reserve active duty program

The Active Guard and Reserve (AGR) is a United States Army and United States Air Force federal military program which places Army National Guard and Army Reserve soldiers and Air National Guard and Air Force Reserve airmen on federal active duty status under Title 10 U.S.C., or full-time National Guard duty under Title 32 U.S.C. 502(f) for a period of 180 consecutive days or greater in order to provide full-time support to National Guard and Reserve organizations for the purpose of leading, organizing, administering, recruiting, instructing, or training the Reserve Components according to Subsection 101(d)(6). AGR personnel may also be assigned to active duty roles in support of Regular Army and Regular Air Force organizations or joint organizations such as the Office of the Secretary of Defense, secretary of the Army, secretary of the Air Force, the Joint Staff, or the unified combatant commands.

== History ==
Since September 11, 2001, substantial numbers of AGRs have been placed on active duty for direct support of the Active Component (also known as the Regular Component) of the armed forces in order to fill critical shortfall requirements for which no qualified Active Component fill is available. Most often, these are general officers and field grade officers in the commissioned officer ranks and senior non-commissioned officers in the enlisted ranks, typically assigned to the Joint Staff, the Army Staff, the Air Staff, or the combatant commands.

Soldiers and Airmen in such status are commonly referred to as AGRs. Although they continue to be members of the Reserve Components, they are in a different federal status than traditional part-time Army Reserve Component or Air Reserve Component members (including full-time Army Reserve Technician and Air Reserve Technician Program members) called to active duty for training, special work, operational support to the Active Component, or mobilized for contingency operations.

Full-time active duty staffing for certain units with critical CONUS stateside missions, such as the National Guard Bureau, the 1st Air Force, the Eastern Air Defense Sector, the Western Air Defense Sector, and the 176th Air Defense Squadron, have been converted from regular active duty personnel to "all AGR" in order to provide more consistent manning and operational continuity.

Starting in October 2022, many AGR positions across the Air Force Reserve Command (AGR) were converted into a full-time career track positions once the servicemember achieved six years of service as an AGR.

== Navy Reserve, Marine Corps Reserve, and Coast Guard Reserve counterparts ==
The sea services (i.e., United States Navy, United States Marine Corps, and United States Coast Guard) do not have an AGR program per se, but do have cadres of full-time active duty personnel in support of the respective Reserve Components and/or integrated with the Active Component.

U.S. Navy Reserve Training and Administration of the Reserve (TAR) officers and sailors (formerly known as Full-Time Support (FTS) personnel from 2005 to 2021), U.S. Marine Corps Active Reserve (AR), and U.S. Coast Guard Reserve Program Administrators (RPAs) are technically included in the definition of AGR. But whereas Army and Air Force Reserve Component personnel can enter the AGR program at any point in their careers, entry into the sea service programs is typically limited to E-5 and below for enlisted personnel, W-2 for warrant officers, and O-3 or O-4, the latter with less than three years' time in grade (TIG) as an O-4, for commissioned officers.

Approximately 95% of Navy TAR, Marine Corps AR and Coast Guard RPA officers and enlisted personnel enter these programs directly from the Active Component. Unlike the Army and Air Force AGR programs, the TAR, AR and RPA career tracks are considered permanent active duty career programs, with no opportunity for senior enlisted or senior officers to enter later in their careers from "traditional" part-time Reserve status at the E-7/E-8/E-9, O-5/O-6, or General Officer/Flag Officer levels.

Senior officers in the TAR, AR and RPA programs are also subject to continuation boards at the O-5 and O-6 level and may be subject to an earlier mandated retirement date than their Regular Navy, Regular Marine Corps or Regular Coast Guard counterparts of the same pay grade in the Active Component or their "traditional" Navy Selected Reserve (SELRES), Selected Marine Corps Reserve (SMCR) or Coast Guard Selected Reserve (SELRES) counterparts in the Reserve Component, including the latter when recalled back to active duty.

Since September 11, 2001, substantial numbers of "traditional" part-time Reserve officers of the Navy, Marine Corps and Coast Guard above the rank of O-3 and senior enlisted at E-6 and above have been recalled to active duty for successive back-to-back or near back-to-back active duty periods under mobilization, special work or operational support orders, filling shortfalls for two, three, four, or more years for which no qualified Active Component or TAR officer or senior enlisted is available. In addition, certain Reserve Component personnel with specific talents and/or experience have also been recalled to active duty as "by name" requests by Active Component senior leadership (typically at the flag officer / general officer level). Concurrently, numerous Reserve Component flag officers and general officers have also been recalled to active duty by Active Component senior leadership, both uniformed and civilian. However, career tenure (other than for Reserve retirement) and an active duty retirement, while occasionally achieved by these personnel, are not guaranteed.

Navy Reserve Canvasser/Recruiters are also included in the AGR definition but may be accessed at the E-7/8/9, W-2/3/4/5, and O-3/4/5 pay grades. Unlike the Navy's TAR program, Navy Reserve Canvasser/Recruiter is not considered a career program, so career tenure protections and an active duty retirement are not guaranteed.

== See also ==
- Individual Ready Reserve or IRR
