= The Other Side of the Mountain (Jalali and Grau book) =

1998 book by Ali Ahmad Jalali and Lester W. Grau

The Other Side of the Mountain: Mujahadeen Tactics in the Soviet-Afghan War
- Cover Art
- Authors: Ali Ahmad Jalali; Lester W. Grau
- Cover artist: Emily Pierce
- Language: English
- Subject: Soviet–Afghan War; Military tactics; Guerilla warfare
- Genre: Nonfiction
- Publisher: USMC Studies and Analysis Division
- Publication date: 1998
- Publication place: United States
- Media type: Paperback
- Pages: 419

The Other Side of the Mountain: Mujahadeen Tactics in the Soviet-Afghan War is a 1998 non-fiction book written by former Afghan Army Colonel Ali Ahmad Jalali and American military scholar Lester W. Grau.

== Background ==
The book was commissioned by the United States Marine Corps Studies and Analysis Division to complement Grau's previous book, The Bear Went Over the Mountain. Jalali and Grau had planned travel into Afghanistan to interview Mujahideen fighters in late 1996, but were forced to remain in Pakistan as the Taliban began to seize major portions of Afghanistan, eventually capturing Kabul on September 27. Jalali interviewed approximately 40 Mujahideen during the month which the authors spent in Pakistan and an associate, Major Nasrullah Safi, conducted interviews inside Afghanistan for two months to collect additional data.

== Synopsis ==
The Other Side of the Mountain is a compilation of selected anecdotes from Afghan Mujahideen recollecting their various combat actions against Soviet forces during the Soviet-Afghan War. The 92 vignettes along with accompanying maps including operational graphics are arranged chronologically and assembled topically, based on type of action, into 14 chapters. Each chapter opens with a brief summary and a simple map depicting the general locations of the vignettes inside Afghanistan. Soviet operational graphics were used in the detailed vignette maps, since the Afghan Army used them and many Mujahideen were familiar with them. The 15th chapter concludes the book by assessing the technology, command challenges, effects of decentralized command, professionalism, logistics, and tactics used by the Mujahideen.

== Title ==
The title alludes to Lester Grau's previous book, The Bear Went Over the Mountain, which presented the Soviet–Afghan War solely from the Soviet perspective. This book focuses on the Mujahideen perspective, thus the "other side" of the mountain.

== Reception ==
William C. Green declares that Jalali's and Grau's "highly readable compilation is a significant contribution to the literature on guerilla warfare" in a review for Naval War College Review. He is critical of the book's topical organization, states that the book is geographically biased, and claims that the "proofing and editing is distractingly bad." Despite these shortcomings, Green still lauds its value as a compilation of first-hand accounts of a successful insurgency but urges revisions so that subsequent editions can better educate American military personnel operating in Afghanistan.

== See also ==
- 1973 Afghan coup d'état
- Afghanistan
- Afghanistan conflict (1978–present)
- Afghanistan Mujahedin Freedom Fighters Front
- Democratic Republic of Afghanistan
- Fourth-generation warfare
- Guerrilla warfare
- Hezbi Islami
- Inter-Services Intelligence
- Irregular warfare
- Islamic Movement of Afghanistan
- Islamic State of Afghanistan
- Islamic Unity of Afghanistan Mujahideen
- Jamiat-e Islami
- KHAD
- Kingdom of Afghanistan
- Lester W. Grau
- Low-intensity conflict
- Operation Cyclone
- People's Democratic Party of Afghanistan
- Qawm
- Republic of Afghanistan (1973–1978)
- Saur Revolution
- Soviet war crimes
- Soviet withdrawal from Afghanistan
- Taliban
- Tehran Eight
- Unconventional Warfare
