= Individual Ready Reserve =

Category of US military reserve status

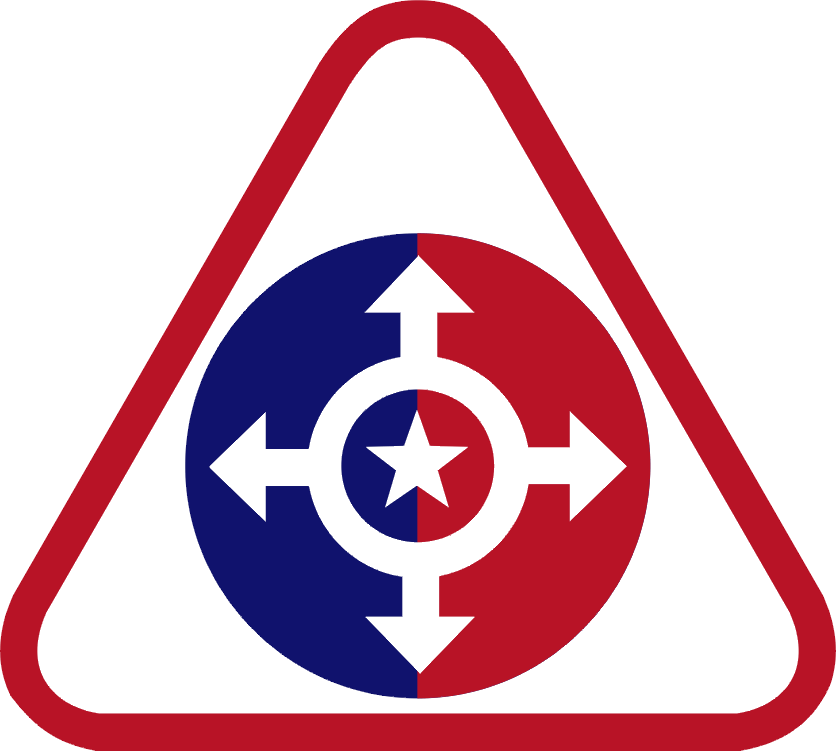
The U.S. Army's IRR SSI worn by Army Reservists in the IRR that are not formally assigned to a particular unit or cadre personnel that run the IRR program.

The Individual Ready Reserve (IRR) is a category of the Ready Reserve of the reserve components of the United States Armed Forces composed of former active duty or reserve military personnel. Its governing statute is codified at 10 U.S.C. § 10144. For soldiers in the National Guard of the United States, its counterpart is the Inactive National Guard (ING). As of 22 June 2004, the IRR had approximately 112,000 members (does not include all service IRR populations) composed of enlisted personnel and officers, with more than 200 military occupational specialties are represented, including combat arms, combat support, and combat service support.

== Overview ==
An individual assigned to the IRR typically receives no pay and is not obligated to drill, conduct annual training, or participate in any military activities (except for periodic Muster activities) unless activated by Presidential Reserve Callup Authority or electing to drill, train, or serve in a "Drill without Pay" or an "Active Duty" role. Unlike members of the Standby Reserve (active and inactive) and Retired Reserve, IRR personnel are members of the Ready Reserve and as such, they retain their status as uniformed military personnel, their military specialty (e.g., pilot, surface warfare officer, infantryman, intelligence officer or enlisted intelligence specialist, etc.) and rank/pay grade. The IRR, Selected Reserve, and Inactive National Guard comprise the three Ready Reserve programs.

IRR personnel also receive benefits similar to other members of the reserve components of the United States Armed Forces to include entitlement to the United States Uniformed Services Privilege and Identification Card and for their dependents, PX/BX/NEX/MCX/CGX (exchange) benefits, commissary benefits, and MWR (Morale, Welfare and Recreation) benefits. Note that these benefits are only available to IRR members in the "CONUS" (contiguous United States). An individual assigned to the IRR may receive pay and full benefits (including medical care and dental care for member and dependents) for voluntarily performing specific types of active duty. Because members of the IRR rarely serve on extended active duty and are not retired from military service, most are not eligible for TRICARE. However, if honorably discharged, they do have the VA for medical benefits.

By law, IRR members are required to retain possession of their service uniforms, retain their military identification card, and notify their service branch if they move and change their address. Upon being called up, service members will usually be screened for their medical and personal status in order to qualify or disqualify them for activation. During the process, IRR members who seek to delay, defer, or exempt their activations have the opportunity to present their case to the mobilization authority for a decision. An enlisted service member's IRR service ends after the completion of their mandatory service obligation (MSO), usually eight years.

In the case of military retired personnel, they can be recalled to active service up to age 60 if they had completed more than 20 years on active duty and are physically capable.

== Callup authority and activation ==
"Presidential Reserve Callup Authority" (PRCA) is a provision of a public law (US Code, Title 10 (DOD), section 12304) that provides the President a means to activate, without a declaration of national emergency, not more than 200,000 members of the Selected Reserve and the Individual Ready Reserve (of whom not more than 30,000 may be members of the Individual Ready Reserve), for not more than 400 days to meet the support requirements of any operational mission. Members called under this provision may not be used for disaster relief or to suppress insurrection. This authority has particular utility when used in circumstances in which the escalatory national or international signals of partial or full mobilization would be undesirable. Forces available under this authority can provide a tailored, limited-scope, deterrent or operational response, or may be used as a precursor to any subsequent mobilization.

When the nation is under a presidentially declared state of national emergency in accordance with the National Emergencies Act the President has even broader authority, allowing them to activate not more than 1,000,000 members of the Ready Reserve with no further limitation. The United States has been in a state of national emergency since November 14, 1979.

When activated by Presidential Reserve Callup Authority, soldiers are required to follow the activation instructions contained in Army Regulation 135-91 specifying that members of the IRR can be required to join an Army Reserve unit if they are statutorily obligated and have a skill needed by the Army. Reserve soldiers are normally obligated to serve up to two years active duty, a requirement that is waiverable by the individual soldier, mission constraints, or the needs of the Army. The Uniform Code of Military Justice (UCMJ), the portion of the public law that primarily governs the military as a subset of the general population, is applicable to soldiers activated from the Individual Ready Reserve as of the date that their activating orders require them to report. This subjects them to the possibility of punishment under UCMJ for being Absent Without Leave (AWOL) if they choose to resist activation.

== Activations since the war on terror ==
Until the war on terror, members of the Individual Ready Reserve had not been called up since Operation Desert Shield. A major difficulty in activating the IRR stems from the fact that many of its members, typically those from the junior enlisted ranks, are unaware that they are even in the military. This results from such members typically being informed that they are "discharged" upon release from active duty when in fact they have been transferred to the inactive reserves. To solve this situation, many military separation transition courses now spend additional time explaining the nature of the inactive reserve. As of 2005, the military also began to enact "IRR Musters" which were once a year occurrences where an IRR member would be required to report to a military base, confirm their personal and contact information, and sign acknowledgement paperwork that they were members of the IRR.

=== Army ===
In March 2004, Army Human Resources Command began identifying IRR soldiers with military occupational specialties that met the needs of the Army at that time. In June 2004, those soldiers were transferred into Selected Reserve units to begin drilling, training, and preparing for deployment in support of Operation Iraqi Freedom and Operation Enduring Freedom.

=== Marines ===
The Marines began activating their IRR members beginning in 2001. They were allotted up to 2,500 Marines to be activated at any one time. So far, two major activations have occurred, targeting mostly corporals and sergeants and those with high-demand training (combat arms, logistics, maintenance, etc.).

=== History of War on Terror activations ===
February 2003:

- Marine Corps Arabic linguists and other support personnel were recalled to active duty to serve in Iraq. This activation was the first time that the IRR had been called upon since the 1991 Gulf War, when approximately 20,000 IRR troops were called up in support of Operation Enduring Freedom.

29 July 2004:

- 5,600 members of the IRR, mainly with specialties as military police or Civil Affairs, were called to active duty to support U.S. forces in Iraq.

April 2005:

- Defense Secretary Donald Rumsfeld authorized the Army to mobilize up to 6,500 Individual Ready Reservists at any one time.
- 3,900 IRR members with critical specialities called to active duty.
- About 550 of those called failed to report for duty, some claimed exemptions, others ignored their orders.

August 2006:

- President Bush authorized the U.S. Marine Corps to recall 2,500 troops to active duty.

March 2007:

- Defense Secretary Robert M. Gates approved the recall of 1800 Marines not in their first or last year of their IRR contract, 1200 of which were Sergeants and Captains joining the I MEF in Iraq. Specialties recalled included:
  - Aviation maintenance, 361
  - Logistics support, 225
  - Infantry, tanks and artillery, 223
  - Motor transport, 178
  - Communications, 97
  - Intelligence, 95
  - Military police, 21

They were used for early rotation into a 2008 deployment. If more troops were needed, another recall was planned for July.

August 2007:

- The Marines sent out another recall for a September 2007 muster and screening for possible activation in early 2008.

April 2008:

- The Marines sent out another recall for a May 30 muster and screening for a possible activation in October 2008.
- In September 2008, The Marines sent out another notification of recall for an involuntary muster and screening on October 12 for activation on May 18, 2009.

As of March 2009, the US Army had recalled 26,954 ready reservists since September 11, 2001. Of those, 10,592 requested exemptions of which 6,352 were granted.

On 16 October 2014, President Obama ordered the activation of the IRR in support of Operation United Assistance.

=== History of activations and authorized since COVID-19 Pandemic ===
On 27 March 2020, President Donald Trump authorized the secretary of defense & the secretary of homeland security to order up to 1,000,000 IRR members to active duty.

On 13 July 2023, President Joe Biden authorized the secretary of defense & the secretary of homeland security to order up to 450 IRR members to active duty in order to support Operation Atlantic Resolve.

== Delay, Deferment & Exemption (DD&E) ==
Delay, Deferment and Exemption (DD&E) are the methods by which a service member may be relieved of immediate activation.

- Delay – When a service member cannot be activated immediately (for example, they are getting married soon), but they are for all other reasons qualified and can be called up later for activation. Usually, the delay will last up to 4–6 months depending on the needs of the activation.
- Deferment – The service member cannot serve immediately for a fixed amount of time (for example, the service member is in school and will graduate within a year) but can be called up later when the situation changes.
- Exemption – The service member has an immutable characteristic which will never qualify them for activation (for example, the service member is an ordained religious member).

== See also ==
- United States Army Reserve
- Battle Assembly
