= United States Uniformed Services Privilege and Identification Card =

U.S. Department of Defense identity document

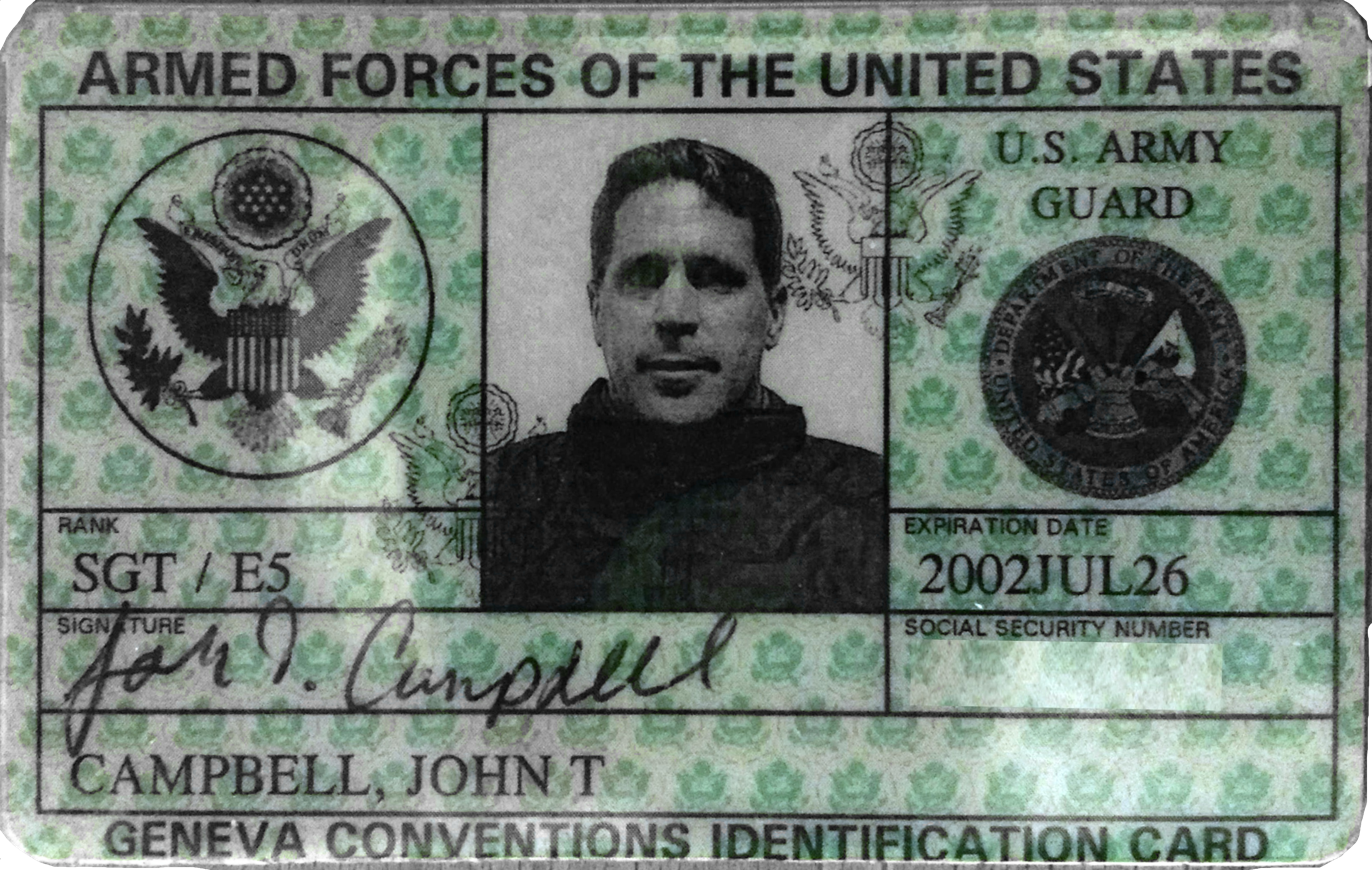
A U.S. Army National Guardsman's Geneva Conventions Identification Card from 2001, with social security number redacted

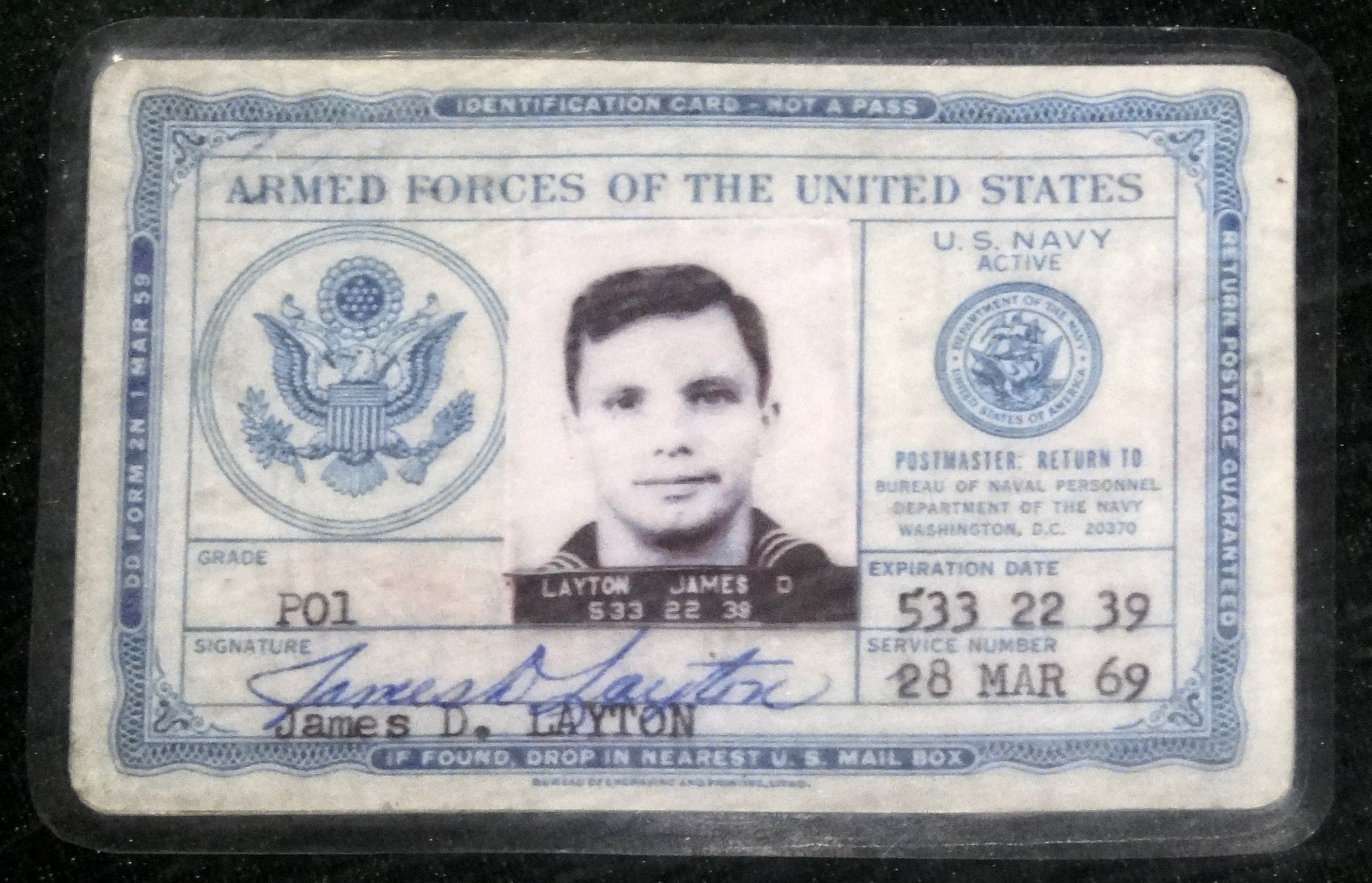
US Navy Identification Card from the 1960s, as displayed in Pyongyang, North Korea

A United States Uniformed Services Privilege and Identification Card (also known as U.S. military ID, Geneva Conventions Identification Card, or less commonly abbreviated USPIC) is an identity document issued by the United States Department of Defense to identify a person as a member of the Armed Forces or a member's dependent, such as a child or spouse.

The card is used to control access to US military installations, base exchange (such as AAFES, Navy Exchange, Marine Corps Exchange, Coast Guard Exchange), commissaries, and Morale Welfare and Recreation (MWR) facilities. It also serves as proof of eligibility for medical care delivered either directly within the military health system or non-military providers via the TRICARE medical system.

The modern military identification card is a smart card commonly known as a Common Access Card (CAC) used by servicemembers and DoD civilians. It works with specialized card readers for use with automatic building access control systems, communications encryption, and computer access.

== Types ==
U.S. military ID cards being issued today are the CAC, for active duty, reserve members, National Guard members, and DoD & Coast Guard contractors and civilians. Dependents, retirees, and privileged veterans, are issued and use the new Next Generation USID card. Though being phased out legacy ID cards are still accepted through their expiration date.

== Servicemember ID Cards ==
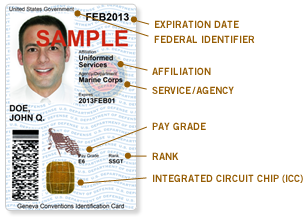
A Common Access Card (CAC).

The Common Access Card, also commonly referred to as the CAC, is the standard identification for Active Duty United States Defense personnel. The card itself is a smart card about the size of a credit card. Defense personnel that use the CAC include the Selected Reserve and National Guard, United States Department of Defense (DoD) civilian employees, United States Coast Guard (USCG) civilian employees and eligible DoD and USCG contractor personnel. It is also the principal card used to enable physical access to buildings and controlled spaces, and it provides access to defense computer networks and systems. It also serves as an identification card under the Geneva Conventions (especially the Third Geneva Convention). In combination with a personal identification number, a CAC satisfies the requirement for two-factor authentication: something the user knows combined with something the user has. The CAC also satisfies the requirements for digital signature and data encryption technologies: authentication, integrity and non-repudiation.

== Non-servicemember ID Cards ==
=== Next Generation Uniformed Services ID Card ===
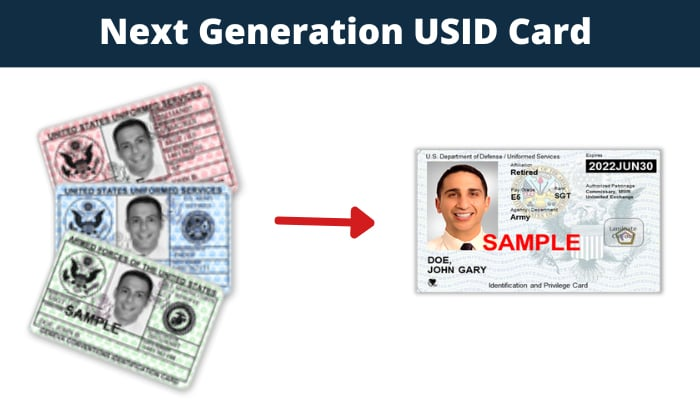
USID Next Generation Conversion

Beginning December 2020 all DoD ID card facilities discontinued issuance of the legacy color-coded Uniformed Services Privilege and Identification Cards with the Next Generation USID card. The Next Generation USID card incorporates an updated design and security features to deter counterfeiting and fraud and is printed on a plastic cardstock.

USID cards are issued to retired and reserve members, dependent family members of uniformed Service members, 100% Permanent and Total disabled military Veterans, and other eligible individuals in accordance with DoD policy to facilitate access to benefits, privileges, DoD bases, and Space-A air travel.

Legacy USID cards will remain valid through their expiration date, however, individuals with an indefinite (INDEF) expiration date on their legacy USID card may replace those ID cards with a Next Generation USID card.

=== Legacy ID Cards ===
Prior to December 2020 the Department of Defense issued military ID cards utilizing a color-coded system the consisted of Department of Defense (DD) Form 2, for retirees; the DD Form 2765, for privileged veterans; and the DD Form 1173-1. Until the CAC was phased in, starting in late 2003, the DD Form 2, in branch-specific variants, served as active duty members' IDs. Prior to the October 1993 revision, the DD Form 2 form number was appended with one of five variant codes denoting branch of service (A, AF, N, MC, or CG), and the typewriter-filled blank form variants were overprinted with branch names and logos. Current DD Forms 2 and 1173 are identical for all branches; the Defense Enrollment Eligibility Reporting System (DEERS) ID workstation prints branch-unique names and logos onto the blank form along with the holder's personal information at the time of issue. Current DD Forms 2 and 1173 variants differ only in the color in which the blank form is printed, indicating the holder's status. DD Forms 2 and 1173 are easily confused as they are similar in appearance and purpose, however they are two distinct forms.

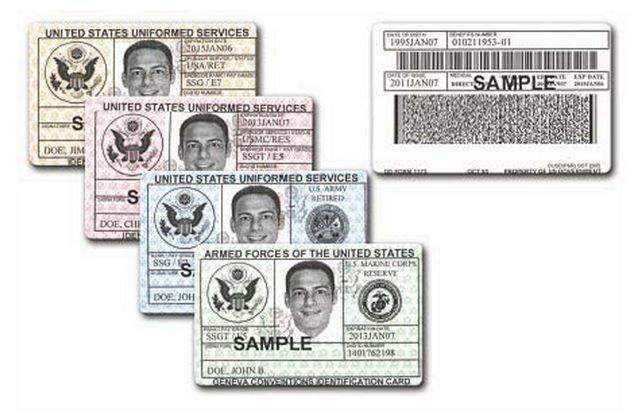
Sample DoD ID Cards

The DD Form 2, DD Form 2765, and DD Form 1173 ID\S cards are color-coded to denote the status of the holder. Colors include:

- Tan (DD FORM 2765) - Tan identification card recipients are afforded multiple privileges. Recipients include gold-star (surviving) parents and dependents, Medal of Honor recipients, prisoners of war (current and former), Air Force/Army/Navy Cross recipients, and veterans who have been given a disability rating of 100% by the Department of Veterans Affairs.
- Green - Active duty (issued only when the Common Access Card is not available or when a service member is released from active duty and is placed in the Inactive Ready Reserves), depending on location; Member of Individual Ready Reserves or Inactive National Guard.
- Blue - Retired members of the U.S. Armed Forces.
- Tan (DD FORM 1173) - Dependents of active duty and retired members. The card has the same color as DD Form 2765.
- Red (DD FORM 2) - Retired members of the Reserves and National Guard under the age of 60 (Gray Area). Also issued to family members of the Reserves and National Guard not on Active Duty order for more than 30 days.

== See also ==
- Identity documents in the United States
