= Defense Enrollment Eligibility Reporting System =

Database for US military, veterans, dependents, and contractors

The Defense Enrollment Eligibility Reporting System (DEERS) is a computerized database for United States service members, military retirees, 100% VA disabled veterans, dependents, DoD active contractors, and others worldwide who are entitled to Public Key Infrastructure and TRICARE eligibility.

DEERS is used in the Real-Time Automated Personnel Identification System (RAPIDS). RAPIDS is United States Department of Defense system to issue the definitive credential within DoD for obtaining Common Access Card tokens in the DoD PKI. Used together, these two systems are referred to as a DEERS/RAPIDS stations, available in 700 locations in the world.

With the expansion of base exchange online shopping privileges to all honorably discharged veterans beginning in 2017, the DEERS database is also used to verify non-disabled veterans' eligibility for the Veteran online shopping benefit.

== History ==
DEERS was created in the late 1970s as a Joint Medical/Personnel Database, and first put into operation in 1982. In 1997, DEERS fielded RAPIDS. In 2001, it implemented the National Enrollment Database, which provided medical portability. The Next Generation of TRICARE Contracts (TNEX), including additional DEERS capabilities, was created in 2004.

== Registration ==
The Defense Enrollment Eligibility Reporting System (DEERS) registration is a crucial process for members of the U.S. military and their eligible family members. DEERS is the primary system used by the Department of Defense (DoD) to verify and maintain the eligibility of individuals for military benefits, including healthcare and other entitlements.

== Mission ==
DEERS maintains personnel and benefits information for:

- Active, retired, reserve and National Guard uniformed service personnel
- Eligible family members of active, retired, reserve and National Guard uniformed service personnel
- Military veterans 100% disabled service connected
- DoD civil service personnel
- DoD contractors requiring logistical access

DEERS is also responsible for producing DoD ID Cards (RAPIDS and Common Access Cards). DEERS supports benefit delivery including medical, dental, educational, and life insurance. In addition, DEERS enables DoD e-business, including identity management, and reduces fraud and abuse of government benefits and supports force health protection and medical readiness.

The Defense Enrollment Eligibility Reporting System (DEERS) is located at military bases and some reserve centers.

== Electronic data interchange personal identifier ==
An electronic data interchange personal identifier, or EDIPI, is a number assigned to a record in the United States Department of Defense's Defense Enrollment and Eligibility Reporting System (DEERS) database. A record in the DEERS database is a person plus personnel category (e.g. contractor, reservist, civilian, active duty, etc.). The Common Access Card (CAC), which is issued by the Department of Defense through DEERS, has an EDIPI on the card. A person with more than one personnel category is issued a CAC for each role, but the EDIPI will remain the same for all CACs issued to that individual. The EDIPI is unique to an individual. Separating the identities is done so that revocation of one role's permission can be accomplished simply by commandeering the card and/or revoking the digital certificates without affecting the other roles.

The EDIPI is a ten-digit number located in the barcode on the back of the card and in the integrated circuit chip embedded in the card itself. The first 9 digits are assigned unique numbers with the 10th digit being a check digit for the identifier. The first 9 digits are sequentially assigned, starting at 100000000, and are assigned for life and never re-assigned.

The EDIPI can be used as a unique person identifier. It is unique to a person not to the person's role (persona) or CACs issued to that person.

== See also ==
- Defense Integrated Military Human Resources System
- Defense Manpower Data Center
