= Lester W. Grau =

- Military career
- Allegiance: United States
- Branch: United States
- Service years: – 1992
- Rank: Lieutenant Colonel
- Conflicts: Vietnam War

Lester W. Grau is the Research Coordinator for the Foreign Military Studies Office at Fort Leavenworth, Kansas. He is a graduate of the U.S. Army Defense Language Institute (Russian) and the U.S. Army's Institute for Advanced Russian and Eastern European Studies. He retired from the US Army in 1992 at the rank of lieutenant colonel. His military education included the Infantry Officers Basic and Advanced Courses, the United States Army Command and General Staff College and the U.S. Air Force War College. His Baccalaureate and master's degrees are in International Relations. His doctorate is in Military History. He served a combat tour in Vietnam, four European tours, a Korean tour and a posting in Moscow. He has traveled to the Soviet Union and Russia over forty times. He has also been a frequent visitor to the Asian subcontinent, especially Pakistan and Afghanistan. He visited Iraq in October 2003. He is a recent CENTCOM Fellow.

== Publications ==
Grau has published over one hundred articles and studies on tactical, operational and geopolitical subjects. His book, The Bear Went Over the Mountain: Soviet Combat Tactics in Afghanistan, a translation of a study by the Soviet Frunze Military Academy was published in 1996. The Other Side of the Mountain: Mujahideen Tactics in the Soviet-Afghan War, co-authored with Ali Jalali, was published in 1998. The Soviet-Afghan War: How a Superpower Fought and Lost, a translation from a study prepared for the Russian General Staff, was published in 2000, and is almost 700 libraries. The Partisan's Handbook, first published in the Soviet Union in 1942. and The Coils of the Anaconda: America's First Conventional Battle in Afghanistan were published in 2011. He is also republishing General Skeen's 1932 Passing It On: Short Talks on Tribal Fighting On the North-West Frontier of India.

He is an occasional contributor to the Journal of Slavic Military Studies.

=== Books ===
- Grau, Lester W., and Dodge Billingsley. Operation Anaconda: America's First Major Battle in Afghanistan. Lawrence: University Press of Kansas, 2011.
- Grau, Lester W., and Michael A. Gress. The Red Army's Do-It-Yourself Nazi-Bashing Guerrilla Warfare Manual: The Partisan's Companion. Havertown, Pa: Casemate, 2011.
- Lester W. Grau, and Michael A. Gress. The Soviet-Afghan War: How a Superpower Fought and Lost. Lawrence, Kan: University Press of Kansas, 2002.
  - Review, by Robert V Barylski, Slavic Review, Spring, 2003, vol. 62, no. 1, p. 193-195
  - Review, by Eliot A Cohen, Foreign Affairs, May - Jun., 2002, vol. 81, no. 3, p. 157
  - Review, by Odd Arne Westad, The International history review. 24, no. 4, (2002): 975
  - Review, by David C Isby The Journal of military history. 66, no. 3, (2002): 923
- Lester W. Grau and Timothy Smith. A 'Crushing' Victory: Fuel-Air Explosives and Grozny 2000 APAN Community 2000-08-01
- Jalali, Ali Ahmad, and Lester W. Grau. The Other Side of the Mountain: Mujahideen Tactics in the Soviet-Afghan War. Quantico, Va: U.S. Marine Corps, Studies and Analysis Division, 1999.
  - Review, by Keith Dickson, Journal of Military History, Apr., 1999, vol. 63, no. 2, p. 502-503
- Grau, Lester W. The Bear Went Over the Mountain Soviet Combat Tactics in Afghanistan. Washington, D.C.: National Defense University Press, 1996.
- Grau, Lester W. Russian Urban Tactics: Lessons from the Battle for Grozny. [Washington, D.C.]: National Defense University, Institute for National Strategic Studies, 1995.
