= The Bear Went Over the Mountain (1996 book) =

1996 book edited by Lester W. Grau

The Bear Went Over the Mountain: Soviet Combat Tactics in Afghanistan
- Cover Art
- Author: Lester W. Grau
- Cover artist: Harry Finley
- Language: American English
- Subject: Soviet–Afghan War; Military tactics; Counter-insurgency
- Genre: non-fiction
- Publisher: National Defense University Press
- Publication date: 1996
- Publication place: United States
- Media type: Print (Paperback)
- Pages: 223

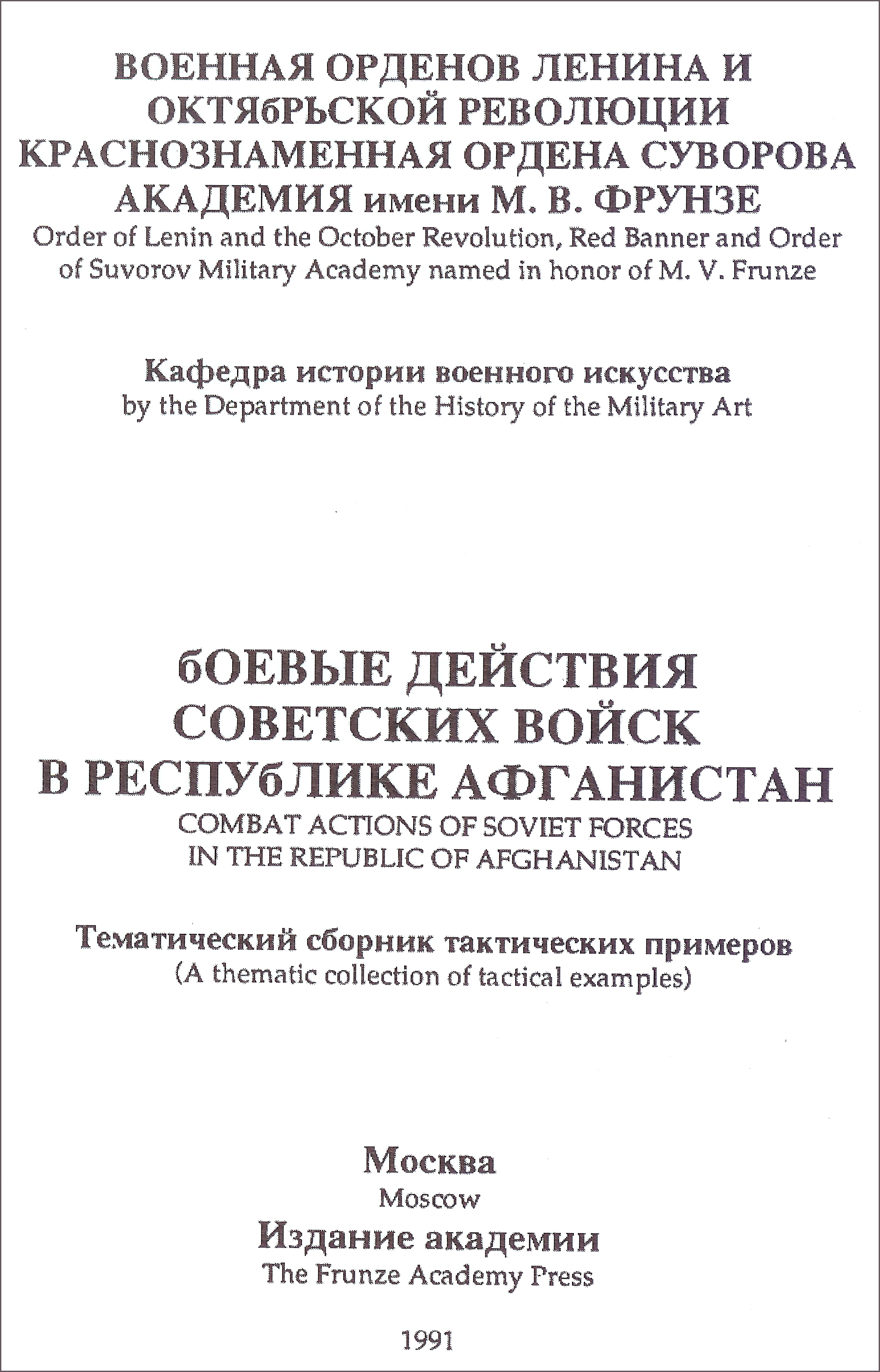
Cover of Original Soviet Report

The Bear Went Over the Mountain: Soviet Combat Tactics in Afghanistan is a 1996 non-fiction book translated from Russian and edited by American military scholar and author Lester W. Grau. The book is translated from a study initially published by the Frunze Military Academy in 1991 titled "Combat Actions of Soviet Forces in the Republic of Afghanistan" and subtitled "A Thematic Collection of Tactical Examples." Grau received the original Russian language text from the Department of the History of the Military Art at the Frunze academy. With their permission he translated, included commentary, and published his results as this book.

== Synopsis ==
"The Bear Went Over the Mountain" is a compilation of selected anecdotes written by Soviet field grade officers while serving as higher staff students at the Frunze Military Academy. The stories are based on their operational experiences during the Soviet–Afghan War where they served as company grade officers. Many of the vignettes conclude with "Frunze Commentary" emphasizing the proper employment of Soviet tactics or how commanders developed innovative solutions rooted in Soviet military strategy. Grau adds "Editor's Commentary" highlighting either the effectiveness of Soviet military doctrine or potential hazards in Soviet military thinking.

The book consists of 47 separate vignettes accompanied by maps and operational graphics, compiled into six chapters:

- Chapter 1: "Blocking and Destroying Guerrilla Forces"
- Chapter 2: "Offensive in Populated Areas and Mountains"
- Chapter 3: "The Application of Tactical Air Assaults"
- Chapter 4: "Defense and Outpost Security"
- Chapter 5: "March and Convoy Escort"
- Chapter 6: "Conducting Ambushes"

A seventh chapter is titled "And in Conclusion.." in which the Frunze author declares Soviet combat experience in Afghanistan "...confirms the correctness of the basic tenets of our directive documents." Grau includes an "Editor's Conclusion" which ends with: "The tactical lessons that the Soviets learned are not uniquely Soviet, but equally apply to other nations' forces caught in the middle of a civil war on inhospitable terrain."

== Title ==
The title alludes to the Russian "Bear" going "Over the Mountain" by invading Afghanistan, implying that the invasion is a difficult or momentous task, which the war later proved to be for the Soviet Union. Also, Afghanistan is known as a particularly mountainous country because of the Hindu Kush mountains.

== Reception ==
In a pre-9/11 review for the Marine Corps Gazette, US Marine Capt Robert C. Fulford found the book relevant to developing young leaders from a post-Cold War generation. He gleaned a sense of operational arrogance on behalf of the technologically sophisticated Soviets fighting what they perceived as a rudimentary insurgent Mujahideen. Fulford cautioned against hubris in his own force, which could lead to a similar fate for US Forces if not kept in check.

== See also ==
- The Other Side of the Mountain (Jalali and Grau book), a complementing book
