= Selected Reserve =

Category of US military reserve status

The Selected Reserve (also called SELRES, SR, or mistakenly Selective Reserve) are the members of a U.S. military Ready Reserve unit that are enrolled in the Ready Reserve program, as well as the reserve unit that they are attached to. Selected Reserve members and units are considered to be in an active status.

When the term is applied to personnel, it is contrasted with the Full-time Reserve Unit Support (also called Full Time Support or FTS) members of the same reserve unit who are active duty. It is also contrasted with members of the Individual Ready Reserve, who are not in an active status.

== Active Status ==
Selected Reserve members are considered to be in Active status. They are required to complete a specified number of drill periods per year by reporting to their reserve unit and completing the prescribed training. They are also required to complete a two-week period of job-specific training. Selected Reserve members receive pay and benefits and are issued the same DOD Geneva Conventions Identification Card that active duty service members receive. When deployed or in Initial Active Duty Training (IADT) they are temporarily placed in full Active Duty status for the duration of their deployment or training orders.

== United States Army Reserve ==
In the United States Army Reserve, the Selected Reserve (SR) is the component of the Reserve most readily available for call-up to active duty. (The other Reserve components are the Individual Ready Reserve (IRR) and the Retired Reserve.) The Selected Reserve is composed of Troop Program Units (TPUs), Active Guard and Reserve (AGR) Soldiers, and Individual Mobilization Augmentees (IMAs). Selected Reserve soldiers are required to participate in military drills one weekend each month and two weeks of military training each year. In the event of an emergency, all members of the Selected Reserve and up to 30,000 members of the IRR can be mobilized.

== See also ==
- United States Navy Reserve
- United States Marine Corps Reserve
- United States Air Force Reserve
- Air National Guard
- United States Civil Air Patrol
- United States Coast Guard Reserve
