= Inactive National Guard =

The Inactive National Guard (ING) is a component of the Ready Reserve of the United States Army, and is structured similarly to the Individual Ready Reserve (IRR). Only enlisted soldiers are eligible for transfer to the ING; commissioned and warrant officers are not. At present, only the Army National Guard maintains an ING.

== Purpose ==
The ING is designed as an administrative category for soldiers who cannot ship to Initial Entry Training (IET) for a period exceeding 120 days; who are pending discharge for failure to ship (soldiers have a maximum of 24 months upon entering active status to complete IET); for soldiers who are unable to perform their required duties for a limited period of time; and for soldiers who are eligible to maintain a connection with the Army National Guard upon leaving active status.

== Status ==
As members of the Ready Reserves, soldiers transferring into the ING are encouraged to further their military careers. This includes attending AT with their unit and taking courses (resident and nonresident) that will help them maintain MOS and basic soldier skill qualification.

In addition, ING soldiers:

- Retain a ready reserve status and receive longevity credit for basic pay purposes while in this status.
- Are ineligible for promotion.
- Are not entitled to inactive duty training (IDT) pay. However, ING Soldiers who are temporarily returned to active status for annual training (AT) or for other authorized purposes are authorized pay and retirement points in connection with duties performed while in active status.
- Are not entitled to compensation for distance learning programs or online military education courses.
- Will be given opportunities to maintain MOS proficiency.

== See also ==
- Ready Reserve
- United States Army Reserve
- United States Army
