= Active duty =

Full-time occupation within a military force

Active duty, in contrast to reserve duty, is a full-time occupation as part of a military force.

== Indian ==
The Indian Armed Forces are considered to be one of the largest active service forces in the world, with almost 1.42 million active-duty personnel. An additional 2.20 million reserve forces can be activated in a few weeks, depending on the situation, under the order of the president of India who is the commander-in-chief of the armed forces of India. This does not include the additional 1 million troops of the paramilitary, which is also an active force whose full-time responsibility is to guard the sovereignty of the nation from internal and external threats.

== Israel ==
In the Israel Defense Forces, there are two types of active duty: regular service (Hebrew: שרות סדיר, romanized: Sherut Sadir), and active reserve duty (Hebrew: שרות מילואים פעיל, romanized: Sherut Milu'im Pa'il, abbr. Shamap). Regular service refers to either mandatory service (Hebrew: שרות חובה, romanized: Sherut Hova), according to the laws of Israel, or standing army service (Hebrew: שרות קבע, romanized: Sherut Keva), which consists of paid NCOs and officers.

Active reserve service refers to the actual time in which reservists are called up. This varies from once every few years to a month every year. During active reserve duty, military law can be applied to reservists, similarly to regular soldiers.

== Pakistan ==
The Pakistan Armed Forces are one of the largest active service forces in the world, with almost 654,000 full-time personnel, due to the complex and volatile nature of Pakistan's relationship with India and the Kashmir region, and its porous border with Afghanistan. An additional 550,000 part-time reservists can be activated in weeks depending on the situation, by order of the President of Pakistan who is the Commander and Chief of the Armed Forces of Pakistan. This does not include the additional 385,000 troops of the Civil Armed Forces who are also active forces whose full-time responsibility is to guard the external borders.

== United Kingdom ==
In the United Kingdom and the Commonwealth the equivalent term is active service. The term "colour service" has been traditionally used to distinguish time spent on active service, versus reserve service.

From the end of the Napoleonic Wars until 1847, men were enlisted for twenty-one years, practically for life. Thereafter, the term of enlistment was ten years, then twelve years. On completion of their enlistment, soldiers had the choice between accepting discharge without pension or to extend so as to accumulate 21 years of service. After many years with no trade other than that of soldiering, more than half of all discharged soldiers chose to re-enlist immediately. Of those who took a voluntary discharge, fully one in five signed on again within six months.

Cardwell therefore brought before Parliament the idea of "short service". The act of 1870 allowed a soldier to choose to spend time in the reserves after service with the colours. As to the proportion of time spent on active service with the colours versus the balance in the reserve, this was to be laid down from time to time by the Secretary of State for War. Among the other benefits, this thereby enabled the British Army to have a ready pool of recently-trained men to draw upon in an emergency.

In 1881, under the Childers Reforms short service was increased to seven years with the colours, and five with the reserve, of the twelve-year enlistment period that the Cardwell Reforms had introduced.

In 1914, at the outbreak of war, forty percent of the infantry were on active service, the remaining sixty percent of the infantry consisted of men recalled from the reserve. (Note: 'Altogether, the circumstances were very trying for the reservists, who formed 60 per cent of the infantry, and were for the most part still out of condition.')

At present, the minimum length of active service is four years, if over 18 years upon enlisting. For those enlisting who are under 18 years, they are obliged to serve at least until their 22nd birthday. Prior to 1999, the minimum length had been three years. Upon leaving full time service, personnel are transferred into the reserves which usually lasts for six years.

== United States ==
In the United States military, active duty refers to military members who are currently serving on full-time status in their military capacity. Full-time status is not limited to members of the active components of the military services; members of any of the three components (active, reserve, and the National Guard) may be placed into active status. All personnel in the active components are in active status. Reservists may be placed into active status as units or individuals. Units may be mobilized in support of operations, such as the reserve units that have been deployed in support of the global war on terror or those called up within the United States to provide support to civil authorities. Individuals may be placed in active status as part of the Active Guard Reserve program, as augmentees to active or reserve component units, or to attend full-time military training.

== Bibliography ==
- Biddulph, General Sir Robert (1904). Lord Cardwell at the War Office: a History of his Administration 1868 – 1874. London: John Murray. OCLC 316005611.
- Edmonds, J. E. (2021) [1933]. Military Operations France and Belgium, 1914: Mons, the Retreat to the Seine, the Marne and the Aisne August–October 1914. History of the Great War. Vol. I (3rd ed.). Uckfield, East Sussex: Naval & Military Press. ISBN 978-1-78-331611-3.
- McElwee, William (1974). The Art of War: Waterloo to Mons. London: Purnell. ISBN 0-253-31075-X.
- Raugh, Harold E. (2004). The Victorians at War, 1815-1914: An Encyclopedia of British Military History (illustrated ed.). ABC-CLIO. ISBN 1-57607-926-0.
- Skelley, Alan Ramsay (1977). The Victorian army at home: the recruitment and terms and conditions of the British regular, 1859-1899 (illustrated ed.). Taylor & Francis. ISBN 978-0-85664-335-4.
