= Panfilov Street =

Street in Almaty, Kazakhstan

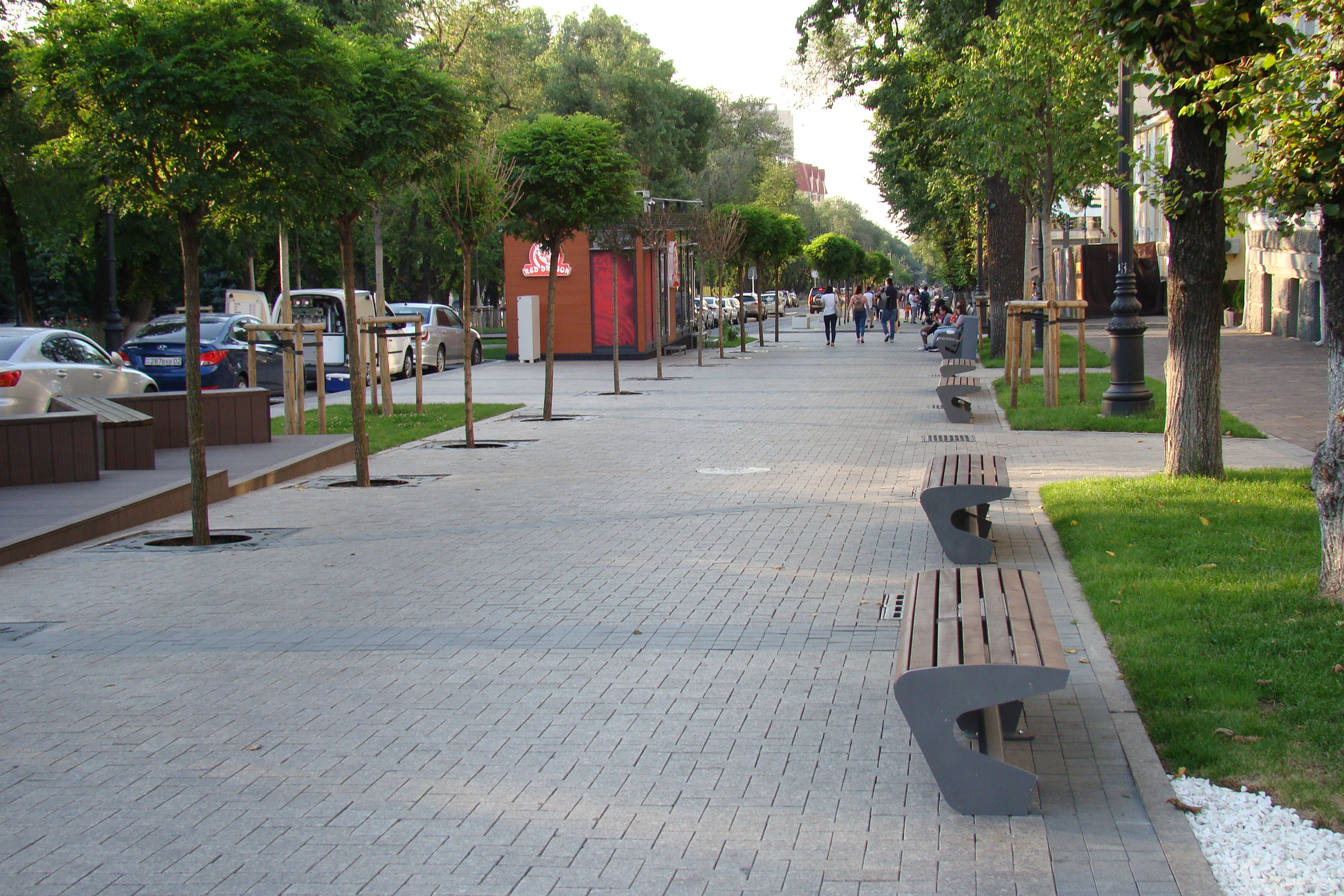
- View of Panfilov Street Promenade
- Length: 0.84 mi (1.35 km)
- Location: Almaty, Kazakhstan

Construction
- Construction start: June 2017
- Completion: 19 September 2017

Panfilova Street is a street in the center of the city of Almaty.

== Street position ==
Panfilov Street is located in Almaly and Zhetysu districts, between Abylai Khan and Nazarbayev avenues. It starts from the railway station Almaty-2, crosses the streets: Makatayev, Shevchenko, Zhibek Zholy, Gogol, Kazybek bi, Tole bi, Al-farabi and ends on Hadji-Mukan street. The street length is 3,800 m (12,500 ft).

== History ==
Panfilov Street was formed in the second half of the 19th century as a meridian, crossing the center of Verny from north to south, then it housed: a military cathedral, artillery barracks, settled small officials, merchants, wealthy artisans, officer-Cossack families. The street was considered second-rate, adjacent to the center, where the city nobility lived. The history of the street is rich in revolutionary events: the 2nd Semirechye Cossack regiment was located in the barracks, which played a decisive role in the establishment of Soviet power in Verny; there was the Military Revolutionary Committee. On the street there were demonstrations, rallies of revolutionary-minded soldiers.

During the years of Soviet power, the street was reconstructed, the central part was built up with new buildings representing examples of architecture of the 1930s and 1950s-1960s. The Verny houses and monuments of wooden architecture of the 19th century were preserved. In 1957, on the site of the former barracks, the majestic building of the Government House (now KBTU) was erected, which is adjoined from the south by the V. I. Lenin Square (now “Old Astana Square”), which are surrounded by squares: “Severny” and “Aliya and Manshuk ".

== Reconstructions ==
In the Soviet years, the street was thoroughly reconstructed and landscaped, it was planted with deciduous trees such as elm (elm) and poplar. The main irrigation ditches were laid, into which water from the head irrigation ditch was daily started in summer. At the end of the 2000s, it underwent major repairs such as renewal of asphalt, curbs, irrigation ditches and street lighting.

Since 2014, the foreign organization GEF Sustainable Transport has been persistently proposing to the Almaty city authorities to transform Panfilov Street into a “public space”. In the same year, at the invitation of GEF, the city of Alma-Ata was repeatedly visited by the advisor of the Gehl Architects company Jan Gehl and the representative of Riccardo Marini. In January 2016, Gehl Architects presented a concept for changing the appearance of the city, proposing a radical reconstruction of the entire central part of the city of Almaty, in particular the streets: Panfilov, Zhibek Zholy, Abylai Khan, Abay, Dostyk and Tole bi (Astana square). In the same year, the city authorities (Akimat, headed by Baybek) ordered the development of a project called "Project for the transformation of housing and civil objects" providing for the transformation of central streets, including Panfilov, according to the concept proposed by the foreign company "Gehl Architects". In June 2017, work began on the transformation of Panfilov Street. Granite tiles cover 22 thousand square meters. m. Installed 178 lanterns and 2 fountains. 350 parking spaces and 300 advertising structures were dismantled. All recently renewed asphalt pavement was removed, irrigation and drainage ditches and street lamps were dismantled. Trees were trimmed and hedge bushes removed. As a result of the transformation, Panfilov Street became only partially pedestrianized; asphalt-covered parking and a lane for vehicles were recreated on the street. The surface of the rest of the street was covered with concrete and granite tiles; instead of the removed irrigation ditches, blind pipes were installed. After reconstruction in 2017, dry fountains appeared along Panfilov Street, which are illuminated at night. In addition to the fountains, benches, trash cans, original street lamps, as well as several modern playgrounds were installed.

== Illegal street protests ==
After being transformed into a public space Panfilov Street began to be actively used for illegal protests. On November 28, 2017, a Vlast.kz journalist went to a solitary protest against the amendments to the law on mass media, went on a hunger strike and demanded a meeting with the Minister of Information of the Republic of Kazakhstan. On May 10, 2018, an illegal rally took place on the street for the first time at the call of the former banker, convicted in absentia, Mukhtar Ablyazov. As anticipated by the Soros Foundation's New Civil Initiatives program, the created public space on Panfilov Street is now being used to realize freedom of expression and collectively resolve local problems.

== Name origin ==
Initially, the street was named Kazarmennaya, Krasnoarmeiskaya. In 1945 it was renamed in memory of Ivan Vasilievich Panfilov (1893-1941) - military leader, Hero of the Soviet Union. During the Great Patriotic War, he commanded the 316th Infantry Division, which defended the approaches to Moscow in the Volokolamsk direction. Killed in battle on November 16, 1941 in the area of the Dubosekovo junction.

== See also ==
- Panfilov Street Promenade
