= Golden Warrior =

Golden Warrior may refer to:

- Golden Warrior Monument, a monument in Almaty, Kazakhstan
- Golden Man, a skeleton discovered in the Issyk kurgan in Kazakhstan
- VFA-87, a United States Navy fighter squadron nicknamed the "Golden Warriors"
- Gohan, a Dragon Ball character aliased the "Golden Warrior"
- The Golden Warrior: The Life and Legend of Lawrence of Arabia, a 1990 book by Lawrence James
- Gold Warriors: America's Secret Recovery of Yamashita's Gold, a 2003 book by Sterling and Peggy Seagrave

== See also ==
- Golden Warrior Gold Lightan, a 1981 anime series
- Golden Axe Warrior, a 1991 video game
- The Golden Cane Warrior, a 2014 film
- Golden State Warriors, a basketball team
