= Civil disorder =

Forms of unrest caused by a group of people

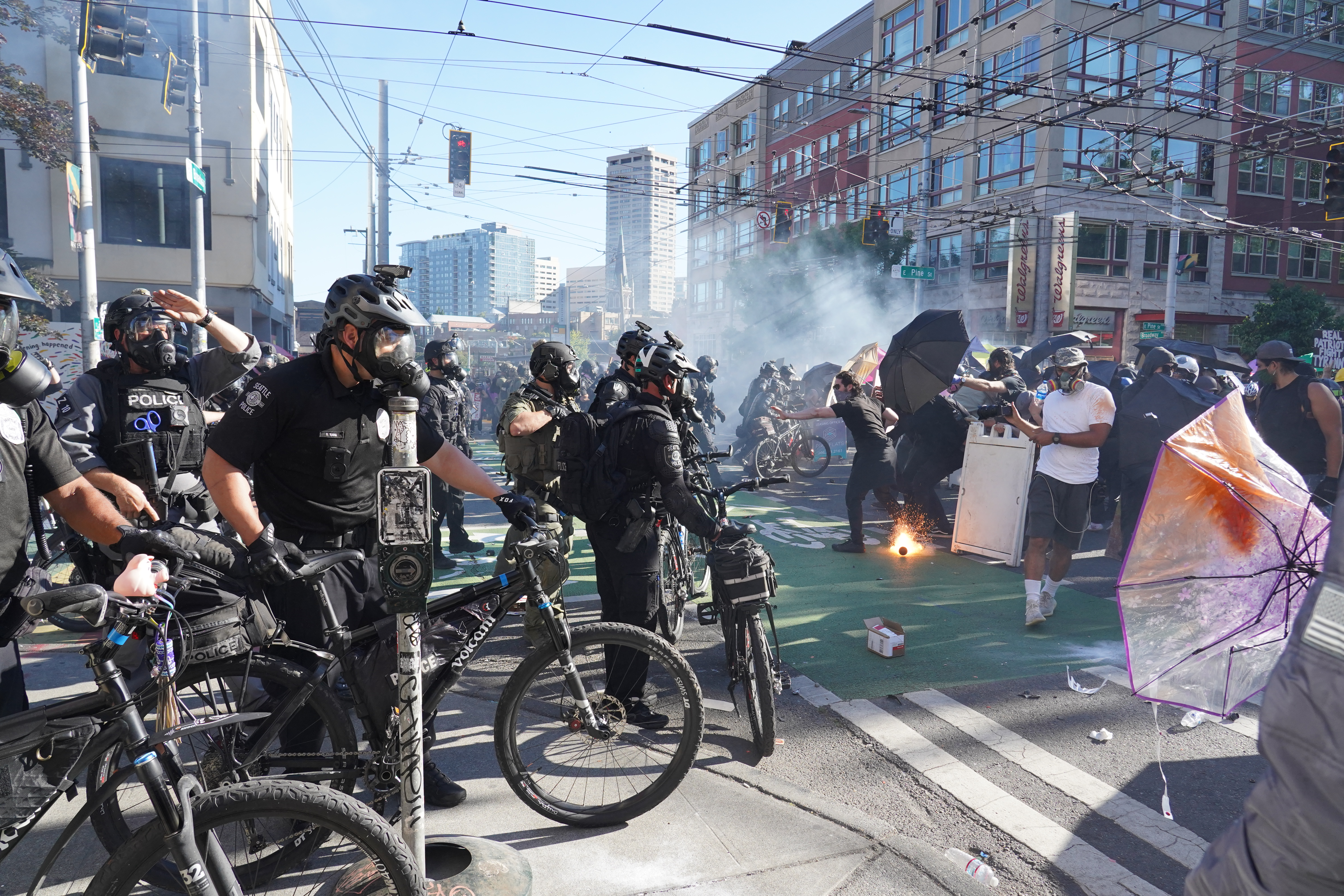
Black bloc protesters using umbrellas to protect against pepper spray during the Seattle George Floyd protests, 2020

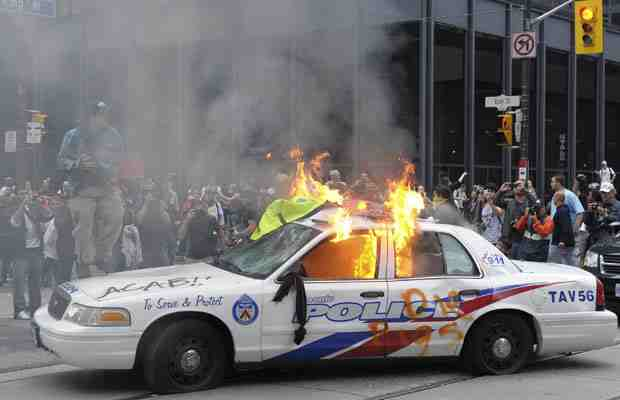
A rioter on top of a Toronto Police Service cruiser in flames during G20 Toronto summit, 2010

Civil disorder, also known as civil disturbance, civil unrest, civil strife, or turmoil, is a public disturbance – usually triggered by social or political grievances – involving physical violence which may cause deaths, injury, or destruction of property. This article mainly focuses on civil disorder in the United States of America. Disorder may occur when the general populace or some sector of it is aroused in the cause of effecting change or reform of government policy, or amelioration of what is perceived as a social ill or inequality. The term is usually used during times of political peace. Law enforcement and security forces are often called on to suppress civil unrest and return society to a state of tranquility or normality.

Civil disorder includes protests and demonstrations, acts of civil disobedience, black bloc tactics, and blockades of roads and occupations of buildings. Acts of civil disorder may begin and end peacefully; they may start out peacefully and become violent, sometimes in response to actions taken by law enforcement forces or lack of attention by government officials. In cases such as some riots, they may be violent at their inception.

They may be targeted at garnering attention from the public to draw them onside in a dispute. They may be done in hopes of ratchetting up the level of public fear or uncertainty and disruption of normal life, thus making the status quo untenable or unattractive. They may be unplanned and arise on the spur of the moment and act as a release of pent-up emotion; they may be planned in advance with careful consideration of tactics and the goal in mind.

== Causes ==
Various things may cause civil disorder. Sometimes there is a single cause; sometimes a combination of multiple causes. Mostly civil disorder arises from political grievances (such as opposition to an oppressive or authoritarian state), feeling of victimization due to economic inequality, or other forms of social discord. Historically many incidences of civil disorder have been the result of long-standing oppression by a group of people over another group. Civil disorder has in history arisen from economic disputes, political disagreements (such as opposition to oppressive or tyrannical government forces), religious disagreements, racial oppression and social discord arising from poverty or lack of opportunity.

Incidences of civil disorder arising from political grievances include a variety of events, ranging from a simple protest to mass civil disobedience or acts of violence. These events are sometimes spontaneous and sometimes planned. Even if they start out peaceful, The events may turn violent especially if participants and law enforcers overreact to each other's actions.

== Crowd ==
=== Formation ===
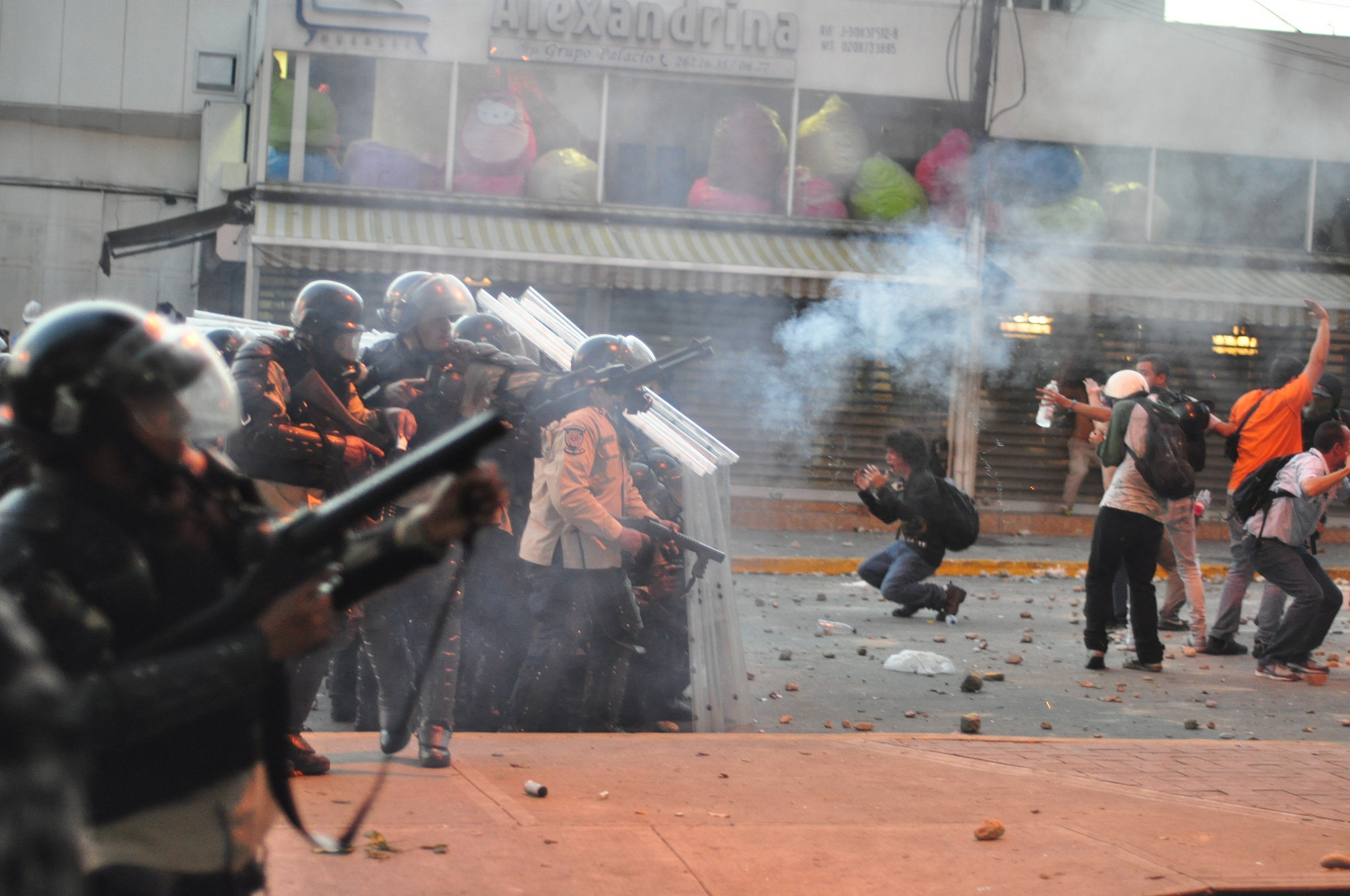
Tear gas used on students in Altamira, Caracas.

Radicals may exploit a crowd's anger in order to weaponize them, spurring the crowd to act violently and become a vengeful mob. Following that, radicals may then direct the mob's aggression and resentment towards a specific target.

Agitators may use media, including social media, to impersonally connect with potential crowd members and incite them to break the law or provoke others. Conversely, a leader may calm or divert a crowd with strategic suggestions, commands, or appeals to reason, therefore de-escalating a potentially harmful situation.

Emotional contagion plays a significant role in crowd behavior by fostering a sense of unity among its members. This unity may cause the crowd to adopt a mob mentality. Crowd members may amplify each other's emotions and create a heightened state of collective emotion. Ideas may spread within the group and to bystanders, observers, and mass media.

Emotional contagion prevails when raw emotion is strong but self- or group discipline is weak. Personal prejudices and unsatisfied desires that are normally restrained in day-to-day life may be unabashedly released in a setting of civil disorder. The liberation of repressed thoughts, feelings, and actions incentivizes crowd membership, as the crowd enables individuals to do things they may have wanted to do for some time, but did not dare try doing alone and without coverage. The crowd's desire to act out may become greater than its concern for law and authority, leading to unlawful and disruptive acts. A crowd excited in this manner may act in emotional, unreasonable, and potentially violent ways, thus becoming a mob.

=== Behavior ===
Crowd behavior consists of the emotional needs, fears, and prejudices of the crowd members. It is driven by social factors such as the strength or weakness of leadership, moral perspective, or community uniformity, as well as by psychological factors of suggestion (e.g., imitation, anonymity, impersonality, emotional release, emotional contagion, panic, etc.).

During civil disorder, any crowd can be a threat to law enforcers because of its potential for manipulation. This is because the behavior of a crowd is under the direction of the majority of its members. While members are usually inclined to obey the law, emotional stimuli and the feeling of fearlessness that arises from being in a crowd can encourage crowd members to indulge in impulses, act on aggressions, and unleash rage. When law enforcement limits the full realization of these actions, the crowd will channel this hostility elsewhere, making the crowd a hostile and unpredictable threat to law enforcers.

Crowds want to be directed and can become frustrated by confusion and uncertainty; therefore, leadership can have a profound influence on the intensity and conduct of a crowd's behavior. The first person to authoritatively direct a crowd will likely be followed. Opportunities for radicals to take charge of a group emerge when no authoritative voice emerges and the crowd becomes frustrated.

Panic, which is extremely and quickly contagious, also affects crowd behavior by influencing their ability to reason, leading to frantic, irrational behavior endangers the crowd as well as others. During civil disorder, panic can set in when members of a crowd realize one or all of the following:

- They are in danger, and fleeing is necessary to escape arrest or harm
- Few escape routes exist
- The few escape routes are congested with traffic or otherwise blocked
- Their actions have caused harm to others (and they fear retribution or punishment)
- if they do not disperse from the scene quickly enough, their life, wellness or freedom may be extinguished by law enforcement agents.

=== Tactics ===
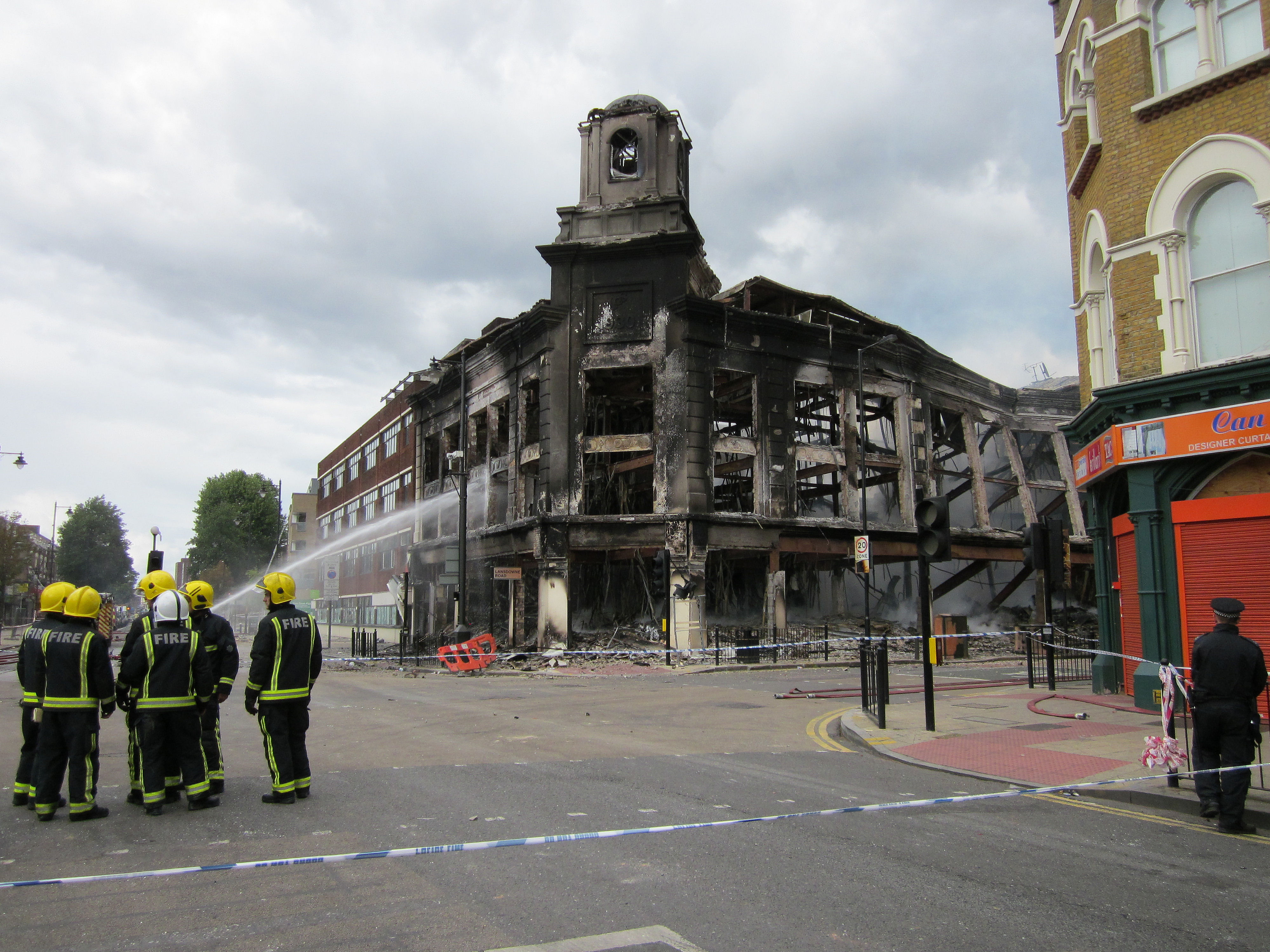
Firemen dousing a building burnt down by rioters during the 2011 England riots

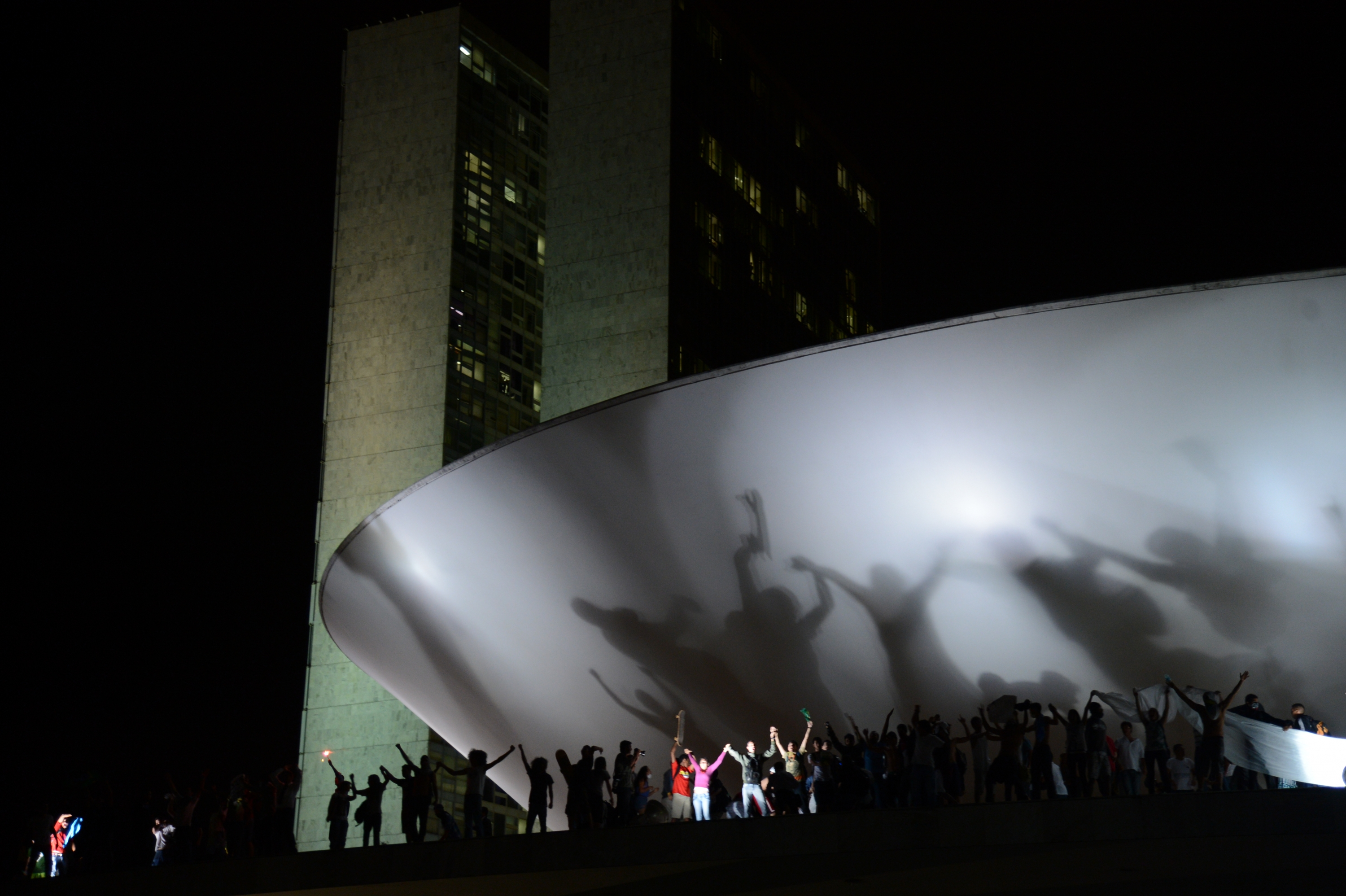
Protesters occupy the roof of the National Congress of Brazil

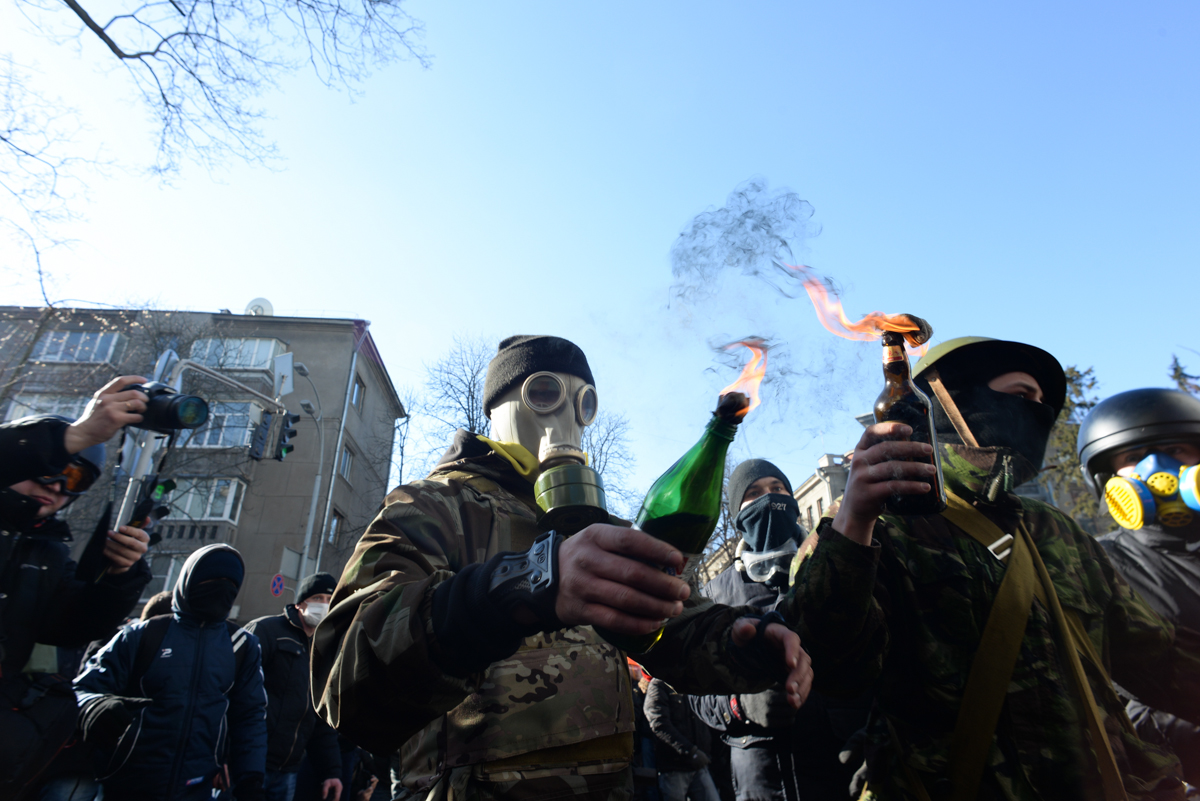
Protesters with Molotov cocktails in Kyiv during the Revolution of Dignity

A goal of violent demonstrators is to spur law enforcers to take action that they can then exploit by presenting acts of brutality in order to generate sympathy for their cause, and/or to anger and demoralize the opposition. Crowds can use a range of tactics to evade law enforcement or to promote disorder, from verbal assault to distracting law enforcers to building barricades.

Well-planned deeds may create effective protest or disruption of normal life. For example, crowds may form human blockades to shut down roads; they may trespass on government or private property; they may incite mass arrests; they may handcuff themselves to large objects or to each other. They may lock arms, making it difficult to separate them or arrest them. They might create confusion or diversions through sit-ins or occupations. They may engage in rock throwing, arson, or terrorist acts.

In response to any of these activities, law enforcement personnel may respond forcefully or with excessive force, which is harmful to the protestors but also the prestige of the force involved. The balance of these opposite effects is in part determined by the tone of the media coverage. If law enforcement responds to an armed mob, by returning fire, innocent civilians killed or wounded in the chaos and cross-fire may make law enforcement look undisciplined and oppressive.

Most participants of civil disorder engage on foot. However, some may use vehicles, wireless communication, drones and other devices.

Participants have been known to use scanners to monitor police frequencies or transmitters to learn of, respond to or sabotage law enforcement communications or actions.

If a crowd turns violent, effectively becoming a "mob," it may physically attack people and property, such as by throwing Molotov cocktails, rocks, bottles and other primitive projectiles, firing guns, and exploding improvised explosive devices. A crowd may resort to throwing rocks, bricks, bottles, etc. A crowd may hide weapons or vandalism tools on site in advance of the action, perhaps catching law enforcement forces by surprise. Arrangements may also be in place to hide weapons or tools after the act before apprehension by law enforcement can detect and arrest participants.

Crowds may arm themselves with:

- Gas masks
- Rocks
- Helmets
- Homemade shields
- Improvised picket signs
- Molotov cocktails
- Paint bombs
- Pipes
- Safety goggles
- Wire cutters

A mob may erect barricades to impede, or prevent, the effectiveness of law enforcement. For example, they may use grappling hooks, chains, rope, or vehicles to breach gates or fences. They may use sticks or poles to limit law enforcement's use of billy clubs and bayonets. They may set on fire or overturn vehicles to impede troops advancing to engage them, and may vandalize law enforcement vehicles to try to spark over-reaction from law enforcement or incite further lawlessness from the mob.

Mobs often employ fire, smoke, or hidden explosive devices e.g. bombs strapped to animals, masked in cigarette lighters or toys, or rigged to directed vehicles. These devices can be used to create confusion or diversion, and can also be used to destroy property, mask looting by mob participants, or provide cover for mob participants firing weapons at law enforcement.

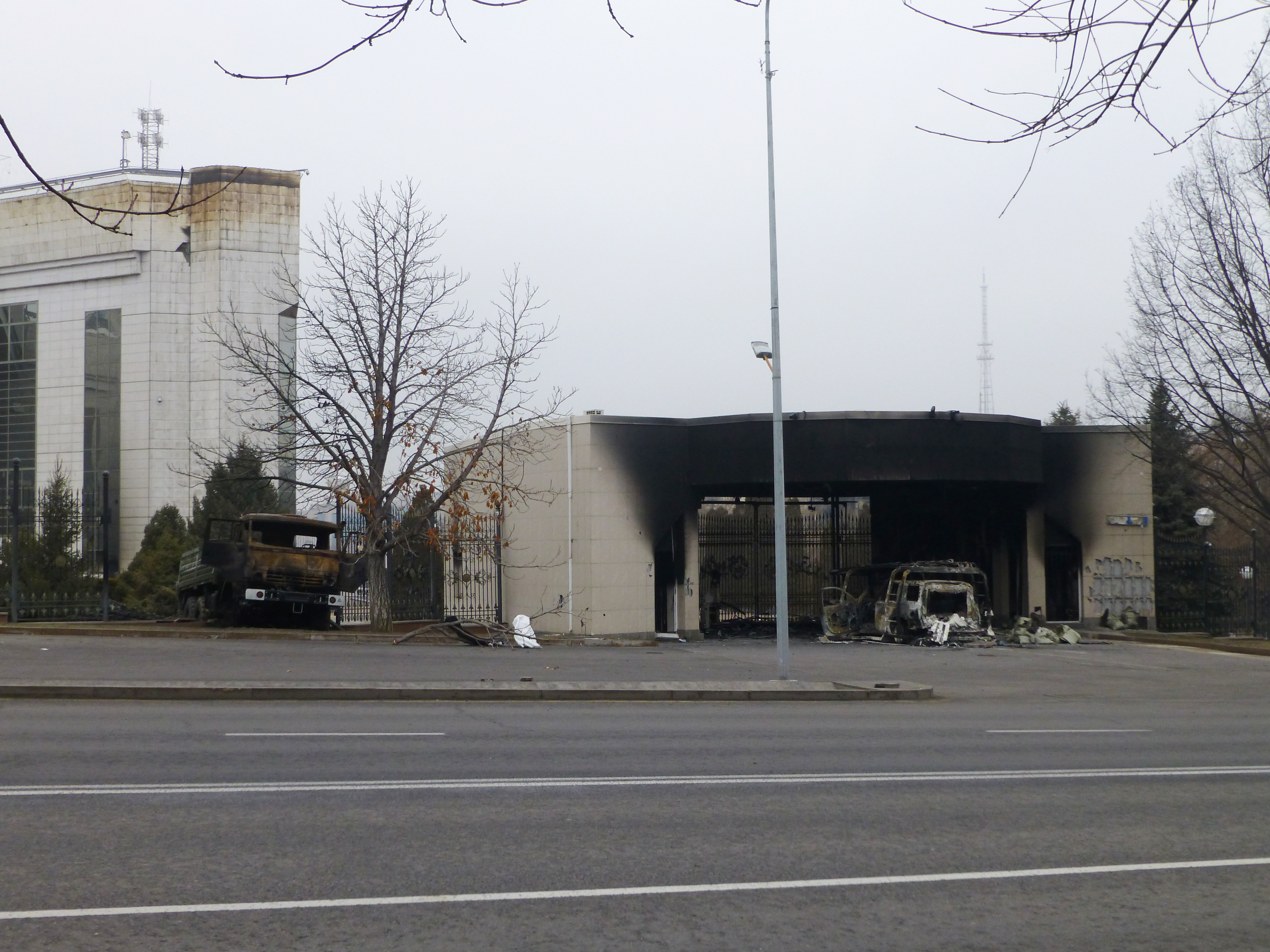
Burnt entrance gates of the President's Residence in Almaty during the 2022 Kazakh unrest

== Response and Legality ==
=== United States ===
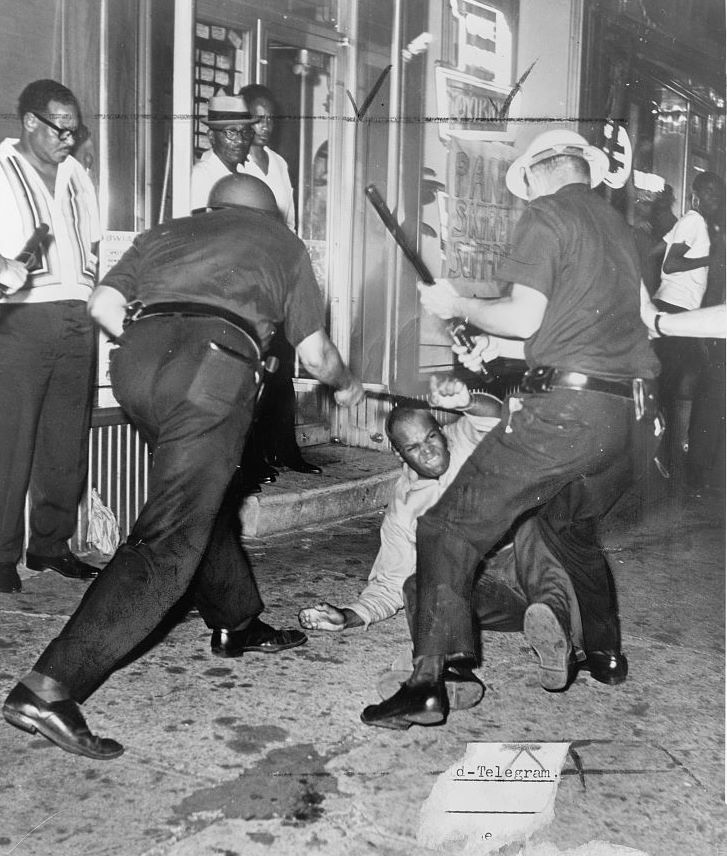
Harlem riot, 1964

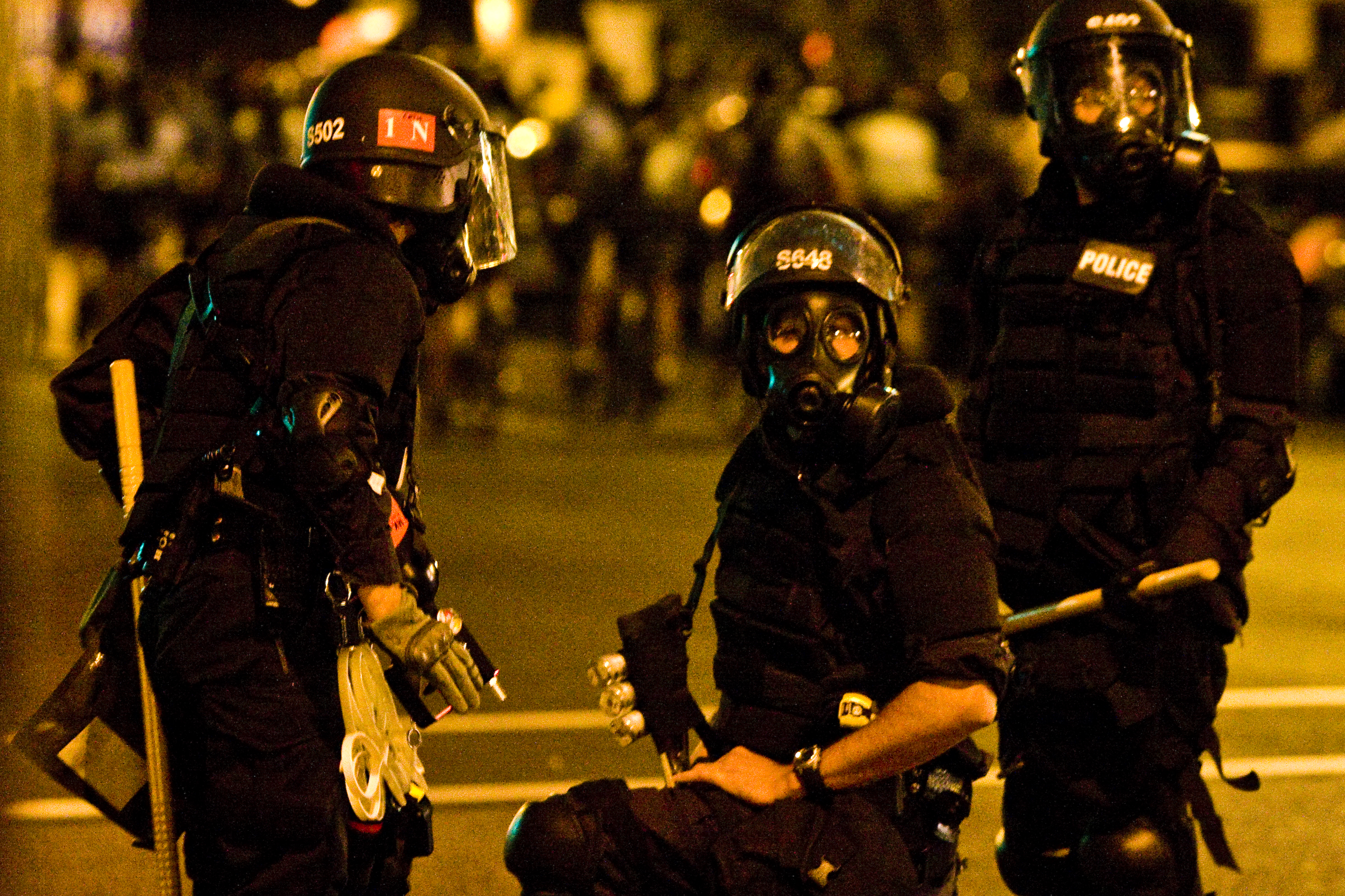
Portland riot police

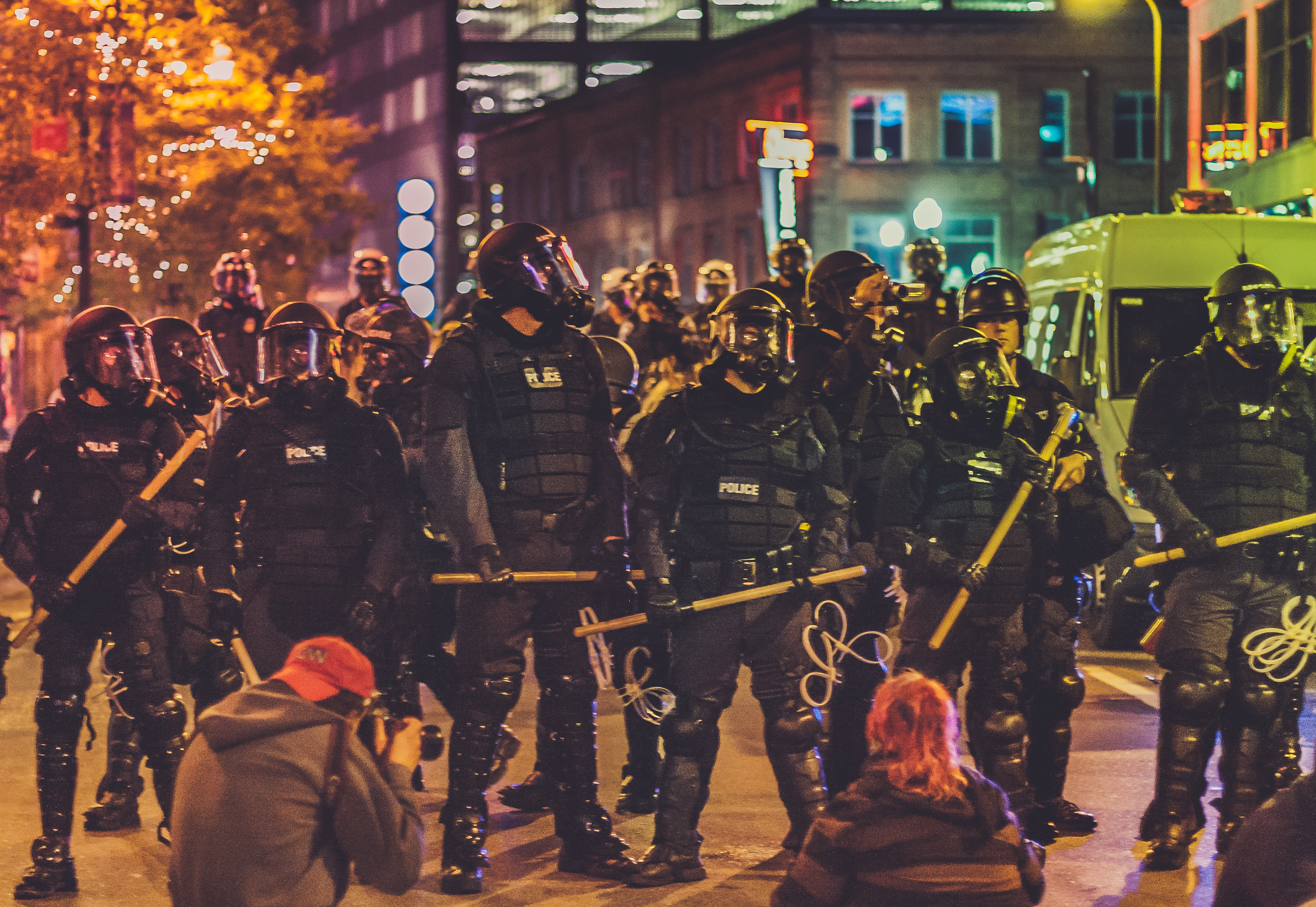
2008 Republican National Convention Protests

Like mob participants, law enforcers are also susceptible to crowd behavior. Such tense confrontation can emotionally stimulate them, creating a highly emotional atmosphere all around. This emotional stimulation can become infectious throughout law enforcement agents, conflicting with their disciplined training.

When emotional tension is high among law enforcement agents, they may breach their feeling of restraint and commit acts, against people in the mob, that they normally would suppress. The emotional atmosphere can also make them highly susceptible to rumors and fear.

Like mob members, law enforcement agents, acting as a group, can also lose their sense of individuality and develop a feeling of anonymity. Under emotional instability, individual prejudices, that any individual law enforcement agent may harbor against the mob, or against individual participants of the mob, may influence the behavior of the law enforcement agent. Like the mob, these conditions make law enforcement actors more likely to imitate the behavior of each other, which can result in a chain of biased, excessive, or otherwise, dangerous, behavior in which law enforcement agents act upon mob agents as impersonal threats and not as human beings. Such action is heightened in which law enforcement agents are monolithic, across race and ethnicity, as law enforcement will become more susceptible to framing the disorder as a confrontation between "them" and "us."

Actions by law enforcement agents are often used as evidence against their ill will toward a crowd, with their behavior seen as further inflaming confrontation rather than reducing it. However, in such situations, law enforcement agents may not be held accountable for all their actions.

==== Legal Definition ====
According to the U.S. Code, a person is engaged in civil disorder if he or she -

(1)teaches or demonstrates to any other person the use, application, or making of any firearm or explosive or incendiary device, or technique capable of causing injury or death to persons, knowing or having reason to know or intending that the same will be unlawfully employed for use in, or in furtherance of, a civil disorder which may in any way or degree obstruct, delay, or adversely affect commerce or the movement of any article or commodity in commerce or the conduct or performance of any federally protected function; or

(2)transports or manufactures for transportation in commerce any firearm, or explosive or incendiary device, knowing or having reason to know or intending that the same will be used unlawfully in furtherance of a civil disorder; or

(3)commits or attempts to commit any act to obstruct, impede, or interfere with any fireman or law enforcement officer lawfully engaged in the lawful performance of his official duties incident to and during the commission of a civil disorder which in any way or degree obstructs, delays, or adversely affects commerce or the movement of any article or commodity in commerce or the conduct or performance of any federally protected function.

=== Canada ===
In Canada, "public order emergency" is defined under c. 22 p. II s. 16 the Emergencies Act as

..."an emergency that arises from threats to the security of Canada and that is so serious as to be a national emergency; (état d’urgence)

threats to the security of Canada has the meaning assigned by section 2 of the Canadian Security Intelligence Service Act. (menaces envers la sécurité du Canada)".

Section 2 of the Canadian Security Intelligence Service Act provides, in part:

threats to the security of Canada means

(a) espionage or sabotage that is against Canada or is detrimental to the interests of Canada or activities directed toward or in support of such espionage or sabotage,

...

(c) activities within or relating to Canada directed toward or in support of the threat or use of acts of serious violence against persons or property for the purpose of achieving a political, religious or ideological objective within Canada or a foreign state, and

(d) activities directed toward undermining by covert unlawful acts, or directed toward or intended ultimately to lead to the destruction or overthrow by violence of, the constitutionally established system of government in Canada,

but does not include lawful advocacy, protest or dissent, unless carried on in conjunction with any of the activities referred to in paragraphs (a) to (d). (menaces envers la sécurité du Canada)

The Emergencies Act authorizes the Governor in Council to declare a state of public order emergency and provides the Government of Canada with extraordinary powers to respond to public order emergencies. The Emergencies Act has been invoked only once, in response to the Canada convoy protest in 2022.

== See also ==
- Contentious politics – Disruptive action oriented to change
- Civil disobedience – Nonviolent disobedience of the law
- Direct action – Form of activism in which power is used
- Insurgency – Revolt or uprising by irregular forces
- List of riots
- Riot – Violent public disturbance
- Martial law – Imposition of direct military control or suspension of civil law by a government
- Pogrom – Violent attack on an ethnic or religious group
- Rebellion – Violent resistance against government
- Revolution – Rapid and fundamental political change
- Sectarian violence – Violence motivated by conflict between sects of ideology or religion
