= Astana Square =

- Астана алаңы (Kazakh); Astana alañy (Kazakh)
- Old Square
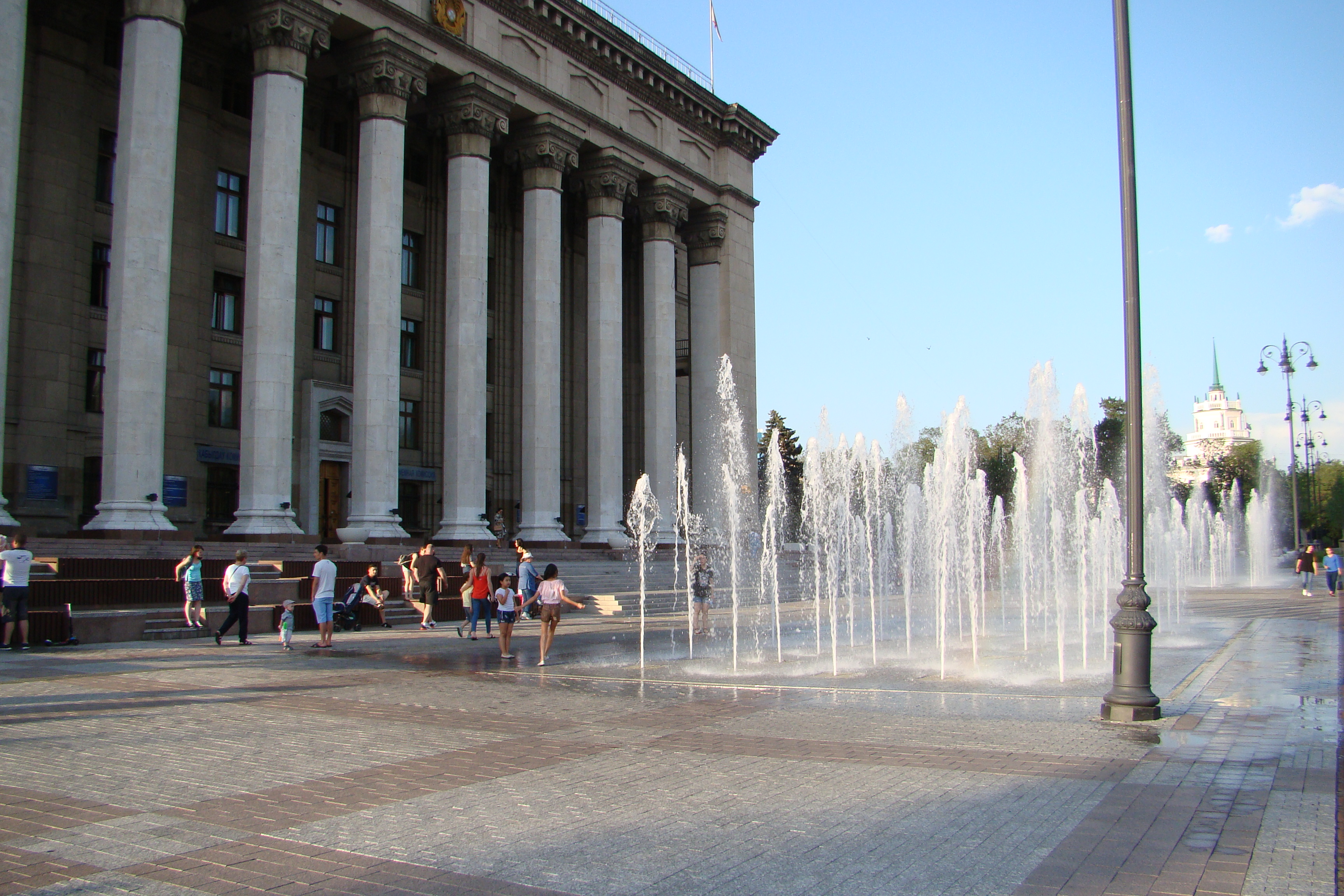

- Location within Kazakhstan
- 43°15′17″N 76°56′35″E
- Location: Almaty, Kazakhstan

Astana Square (Kazakh: Астана Алаңы, romanized: Astana Alañy) or Old Square, formerly known as Red Square and Lenin Square, is a city square in Almaty, Kazakhstan. It is the second largest square in Kazakhstan, after Republic Square. It hosts many public events, concerts, and ceremonies. The square is in front of the Kazakh-British Technical University, the monument of Aliya Moldagulova and Manshuk Mametova, and is on the left side of the Panfilov Street Promenade. The square used to be named after Vladimir Lenin and a statue of him stood in the center of the square until 1991.

== History ==
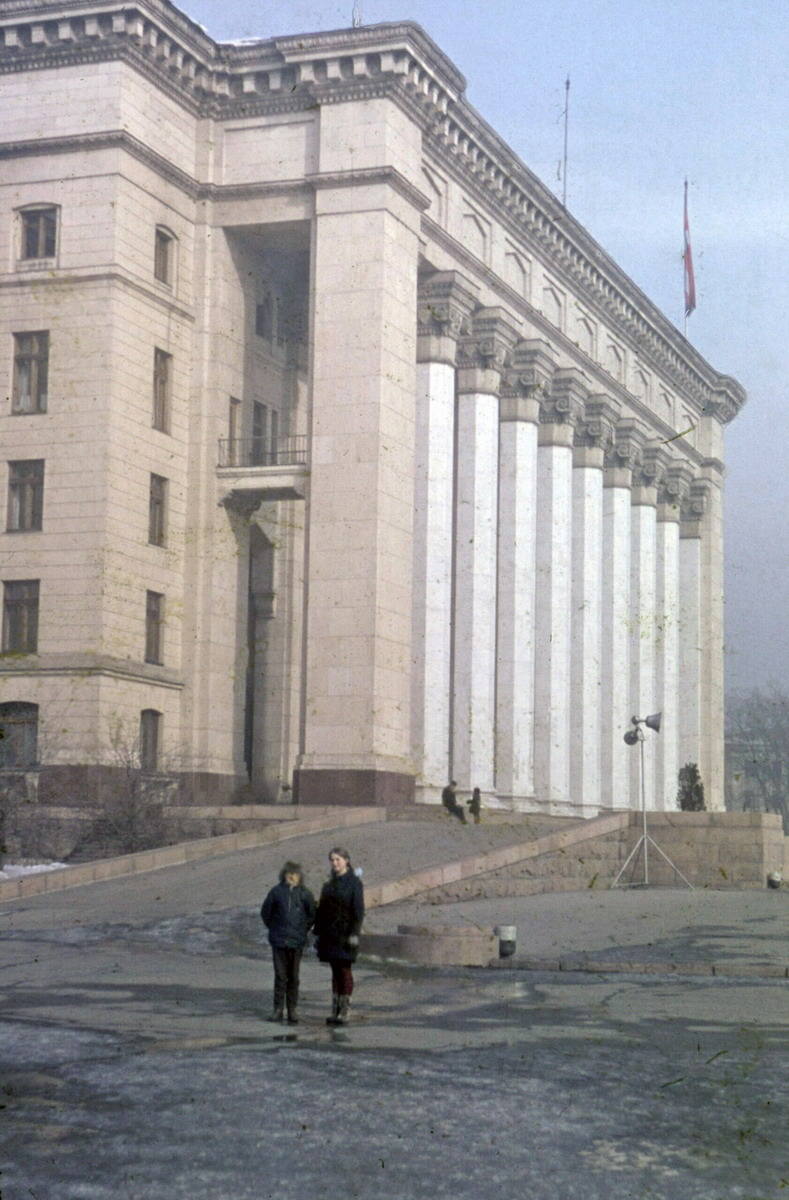
Astana Square in 1969.

In 1921, the area was named Red Square. After the demolition of the Imperial-era buildings took place by the Soviet authorities, new government buildings were erected on the square. In 1937, the square was paved with stones for the first time. In 1955, the administrative building of Kazpotrebsoyuz was built on the corner of Panfilov Street. A monument to Soviet statesman Vladimir Lenin was erected on October Revolution Day on 7 November 1957. That same year, a construction of a new government building of Kazakh SSR was completed which is now KBTU Building. Additionally, the square was renamed to Lenin Square.

After Brezhnev Square was opened in the city in 1980, the area was nicknamed "old square". In 1987 the Alley of Busts memorial complex was established on the square to commemorate the 70th anniversary of the October Revolution. The Lenin monument was moved to another location in 1991.

In 1997, the square was renamed once again to honor the newly established capital of Kazakhstan, Astana.

The reconstruction of the square was completed in September 2017. The number of lanes of the carriageway was reduced, and pedestrians with traffic flows were separated by bollards. In the freed up space, bicycle paths have been laid, granite paving stones have been laid, and landscaping has been carried out with sod and lavender beds. The staircase esplanade has been renewed, where an open amphitheater is equipped, in front of it there are two dry fountains illuminated at night.
