= KBTU Building =

Historic building in Almaty, Kazakhstan

Coordinates: 43°15′20″N 76°56′36″E

- ҚБТУ ғимараты
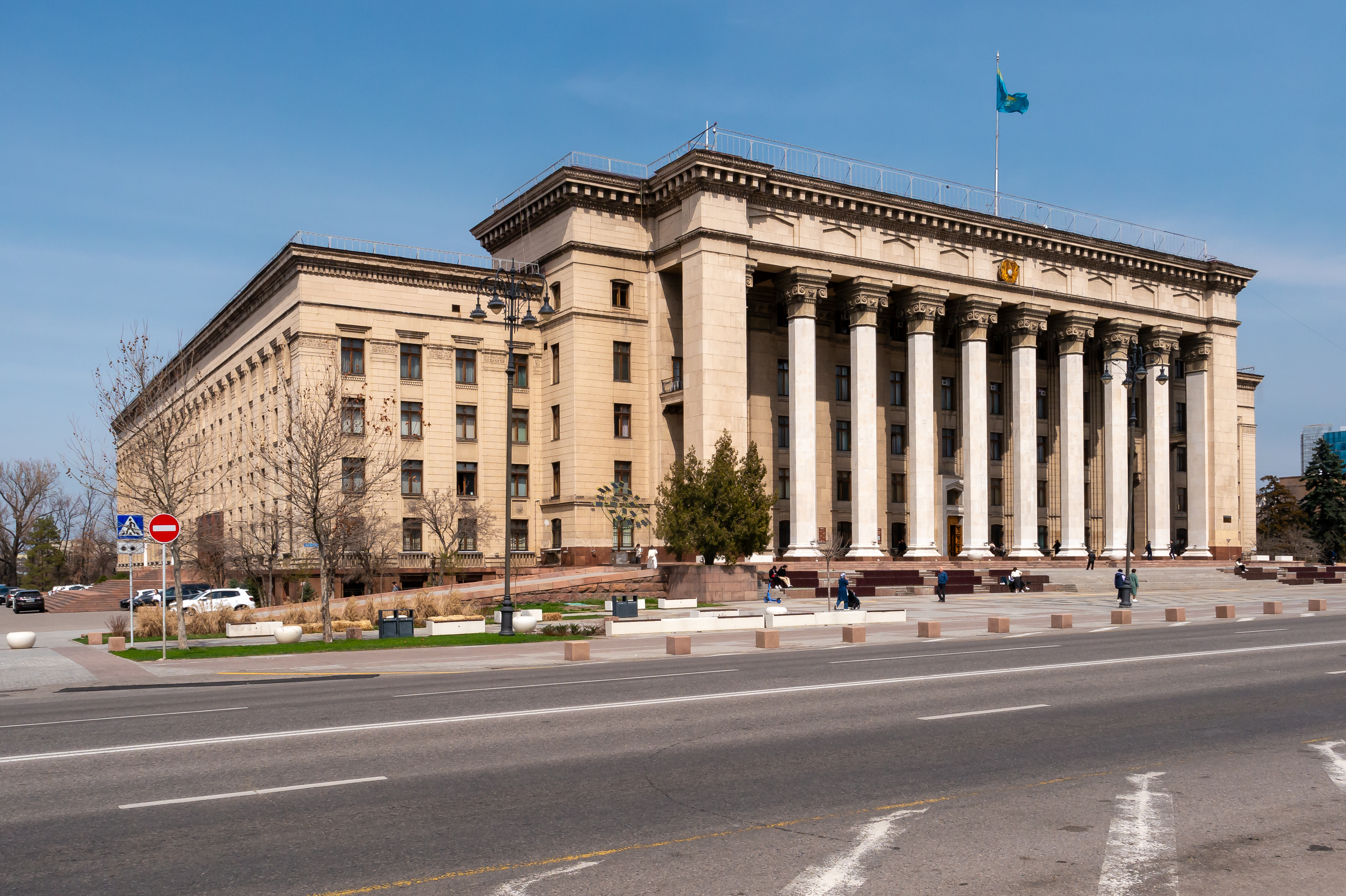
- Interactive map of the KBTU Building area
- Former names: Supreme Soviet Building (1957–1991), Government Building (1991–2001)

General information
- Location: Almaty, Kazakhstan
- Groundbreaking: 1938
- Construction started: 1951
- Completed: 1957
- Renovated: 2018
- Affiliation: KBTU

Design and construction
- Architect: Boris Rubanenko

The KBTU Building, formerly known as Government Building and Supreme Soviet Building, is a building on Astana Square in Almaty, Kazakhstan. Constructed in 1957, it was the seat of the Supreme Soviet of the Kazakh SSR (until 1991) and the seat of the Parliament of the Republic of Kazakhstan (until 2001). Since the capital's move to Astana, it has housed the Kazakh-British Technical University (KBTU). It is one of the most historic and iconic buildings in the city.

== History ==
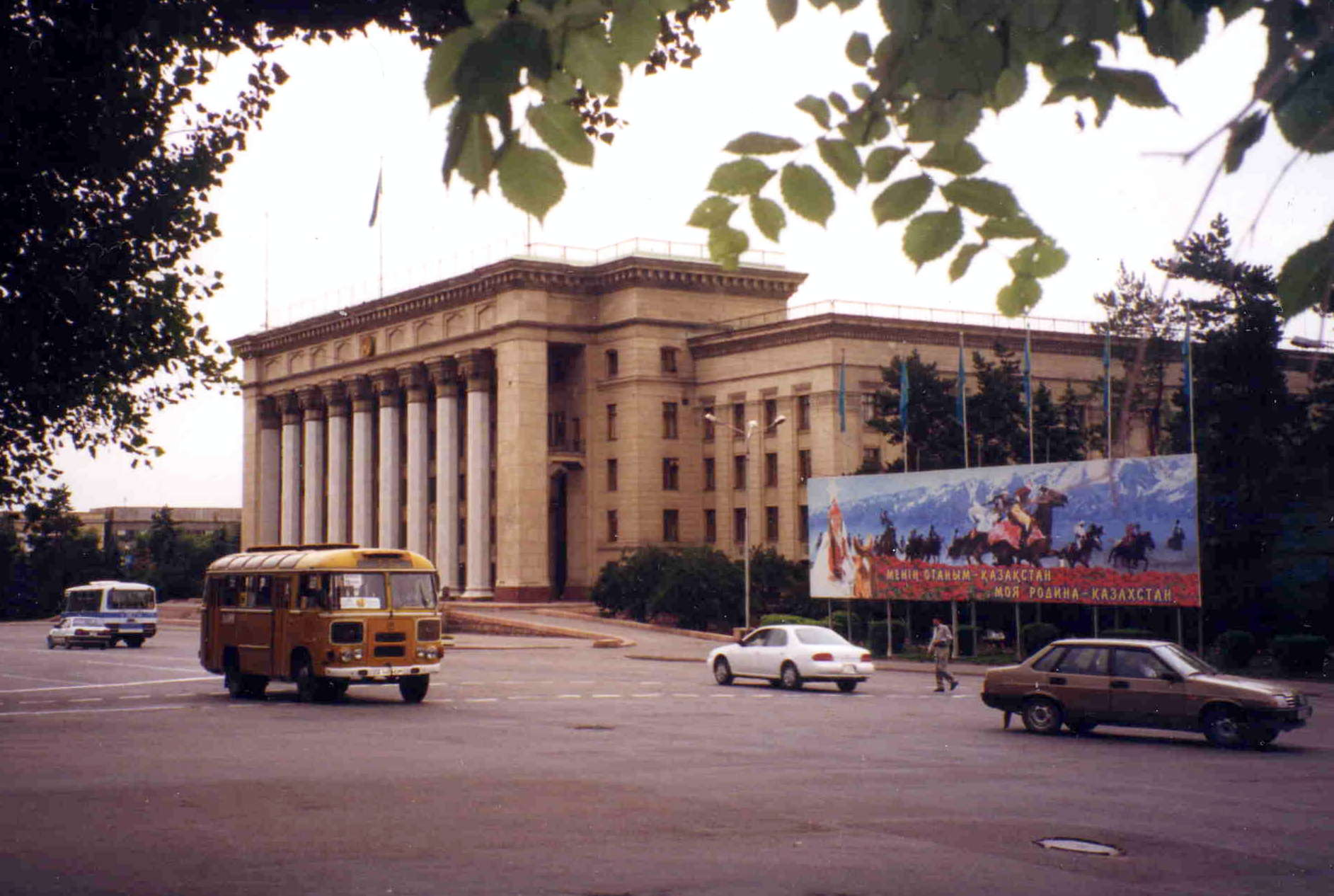
KBTU Building (then Government Building) in 1999

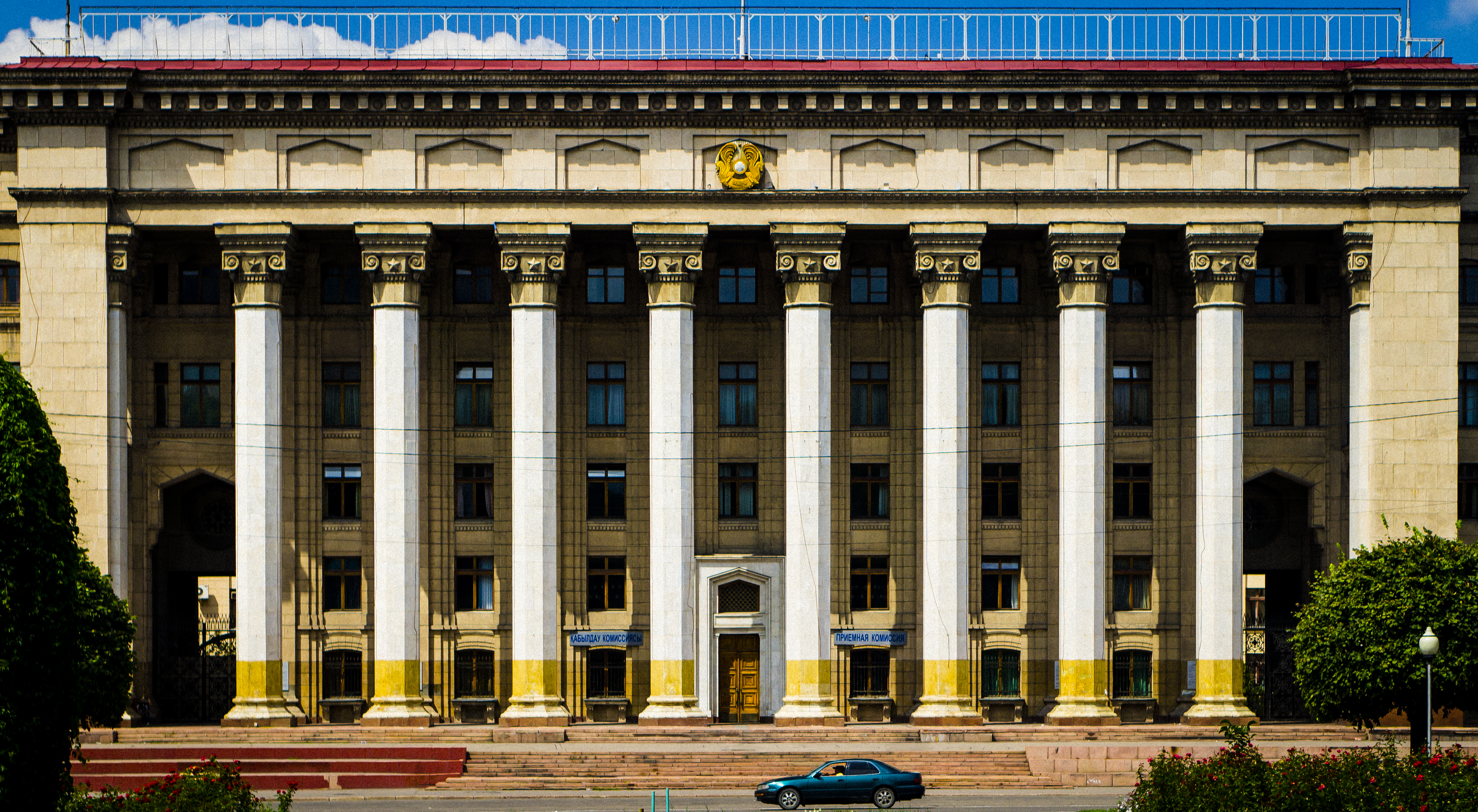
Columns in front of the building

The building was originally intended to serve the Supreme Soviet of the Kazakh SSR. The construction of it began in 1938 at the cost of 14 million rubles, but by 1941, only excavations were dug on the spot. During World War II, construction was suspended, it was resumed in 1951 and completed in 1957. The building was designed in the workshop of Mosproject under the direction of architect Boris Rubanenko. The drafts were carried out by Kazgorstroyproekt under the direction of P.A. Mamontov, G.A. Kalish.

The building consists of three compositional volumes, interconnected by wide passages. In the center of them is the Supreme Council Hall, located along the main longitudinal axis of the building, it forms two rectangular courtyards. The architectural solution of the main facade is a huge 8-column spatial portico, creating an effective play of light and shadow. The interior has a clear layout of the interior space of the building. In 1972, the side halls were expanded. In 1980, the Central Committee of the Communist Party of Kazakhstan moved to a new building in the Republic Square. In 1982, the building was added to the list of monuments of urban planning and architecture. In 1987 the Alley of Busts memorial complex was established near the building to commemorate the 70th anniversary of the October Revolution.

The law on Independence of the Republic of Kazakhstan was adopted in this building in 1991. From 1997 to 2001, the building served as a residence for the Akim of Almaty Region. The building after that remained vacant for less than year until it became occupied by the Kazakh-British Technical University. In 2018, the main hall of KBTU was reconstructed. This required the construction of special scaffolding with a height of 14 meters.
