= Alley of busts (memorial complex) =

Coordinates: 43°15′26″N 76°56′34″E

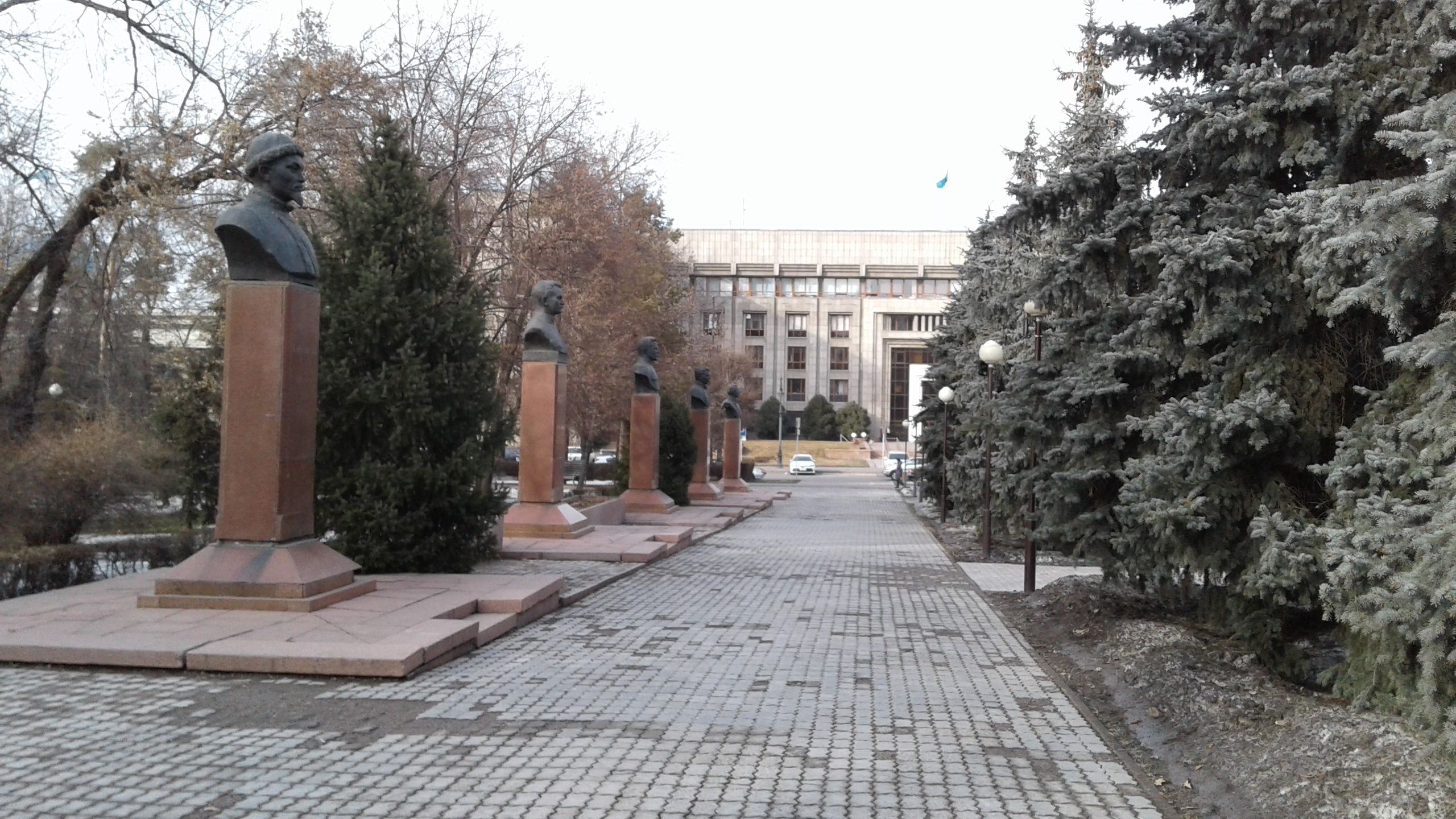
Alleya byustov

Memorial complex "Alley of prominent figures" (Russian: Аллея бюстов, tr. alleya byustov) is an alley of busts in Almaty near the former Government House of the Kazakh SSR, established in 1987 to honour participants of “the establishment of Soviet power in Semirechye”.

== History ==
Memorial complex "Alley of prominent figures" was established in 1987 in the public garden at Lenin Square, to commemorate the 70th anniversary of the October Revolution, the movement for the establishment of Soviet power in Semirechye, the party and Soviet figures.

The authors of the sculptures were famous Kazakh sculptors: T. S. Dosmagambetov, A. A. Isaev, H. I. Naurzbaev, V. Yu Rakhmanov, M. V. Rappoport, A. B. Tatarinov and Yu. V. Gummel; architects: A. K. Kapanov, K. J. Montakhaev, Sh. Ye. Valikhanov, V. N. Kim, Sh. Otepbaev and S. Fazilov.

Each of the figures was mounted on a separate bronze bust on a prismatic pedestal made of Kurdai granite. All the monuments are placed on separate platforms, surrounded by a curb. The front parts of the pedestals are engraved with signatures on the pedestals.

The complex is part of the composition of Astana Square - one of the main places of cultural events in Almaty.

== List of busts ==
- Alibi Zhangeldin - one of the organizers and participant of the founding congress of the Soviets of Kazakhstan;
- Uraz Zhandosov - headed the political department of the 3rd Turkestan Division and was a member of the Semirechensk Revolutionary Committee;
- Mikhail Frunze - military commissar of the Eastern Front;
- Amankeldı İmanov - participant in the Central Asian revolt of 1916;
- Turar Ryskulov - chairman of the Muslim Bureau of the Turkestan Communist Party;
- Magaza Masanchi - member of the Communist Youth Union of Turkestan;
- Abdullah Rozybakiyev - chairman of the Verny section of the Muslim Communist-Bolsheviks of the RCP(b);
- Valerian Kuybyshev - member of the Revolutionary Military Council (RVS) of the Southern Group of the Eastern Front of the RKKA;
- Saken Seifullin - Chairman of the Council of People's Commissars (head of government) of the Kirghiz ASSR;
- Dmitry Furmanov - participated in the suppression of the Verny uprising.

== Monument status ==
On 10 November 2010, a new State List of Historical and Cultural Monuments of Local Significance in the City of Almaty was approved, simultaneously with which all previous decisions on this subject were declared null and void. In this Resolution, the status of the Alley of Busts as a monument of local importance was retained. The boundaries of the protection zones were approved in 2014.
