= Kazpotrebsoyuz building =

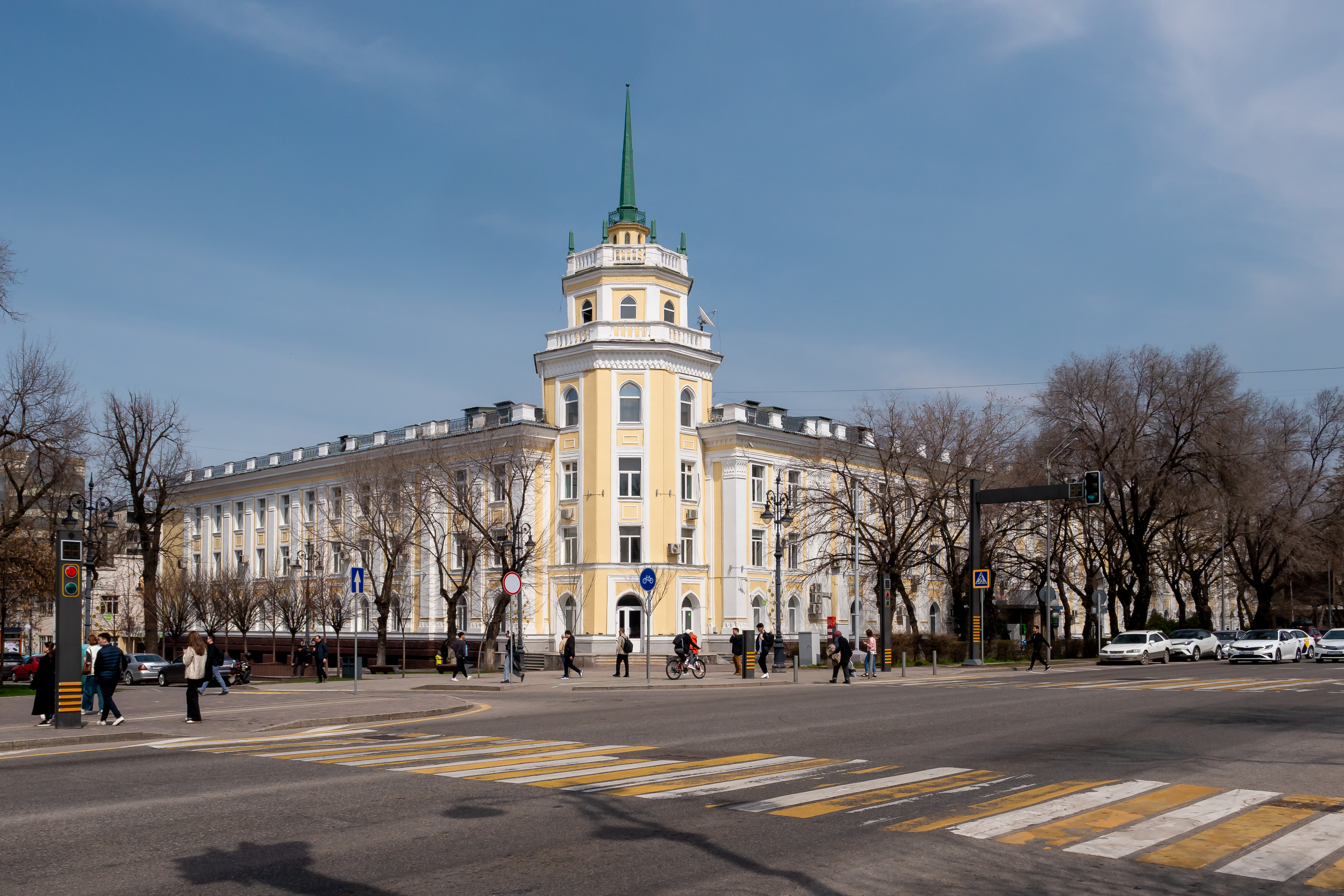
- Interactive map of the Kazpotrebsoyuz building area

General information
- Architectural style: Neoclassicism
- Location: Almaty, Kazakhstan, 57 Töle Bi Street
- Coordinates: 43.255264°N 76.94526°E
- Construction started: 1953
- Completed: 1955

Design and construction
- Architects: B.N. Stesin, G. Bobovich, M. Bekker

The former administrative building of Kazpotrebsoyuz (Russian: Здание Казпотребсоюза, tr. zdanie kazpotrebsoyuza) is a building in Almaty, which housed the central office of Kazpotrebsoyuz. Currently, it is an administrative building with offices located on the first floor.

== History ==
Construction of the building was carried out during 1953–1957, the authors of the project were: architects B.N. Stesin, G. Bobovich, M. Bekker; the engineer was V. Lukhtanov. It is an example of the architecture of administrative buildings in Kazakhstan of the 1950s and a monument of architecture.

In the 1990s, after the closure of Kazpotrebsoyuz, the building was empty for some time. Currently, it is a residential building with offices located on the first floor.

== Architecture ==
The building is shaped in the form of Cyrillic letter “Г”, symmetrical three-story body on a low plinth consists of three pavilions, separated by anti-seismic joints. The main facade faces Government Square.

In the three-story building, the corner is highlighted by a six-story tower with a tall spire. The form of the tower is borrowed from the Central Asian architectural tradition and is sunken in relation to both facades of the building. The tapering upward is done by ledges, the edges of which are framed with a profiled cornice and balusters. The cornice above the fourth floor is completed with stalactites.

The windows and doors of the first floor of the tower, as well as of the whole building, have a lancet shape and a rectangular frame with ornamental fillings. The windowsills of the second floor are united by a belt. The windows on the three floors of the second floor have a common rectangular casing. Above the lancet window on the fourth floor there is a patterned filling. Between the windows of the second, third and fourth floors there are panels. The second tier ends with a developed complex profiled cornice with an arcature band and shaped brackets. The fence of the area on the roof of the tier is an arcade on columns between the bollards. The one-story third tier is an octagon with narrow corner blades, an ornamented frieze and a three-part cornice. The lancet windows have a simple platband.

Under the two-part window sill there are shaped brackets. On the blank wall between the pilasters in the corner of the building (at the corner of Nazarbayev Avenue) is a cartouche with the date of construction - 1957. Its structure includes a small cornice. The fence of the roof is made in the form of a figured lattice between the bollards. Above the converged windows in the corner of the building between the bollards of the roof railing is placed a shield with volutes.

== Monument status ==
On 10 November 2010, a new State List of Historical and Cultural Monuments of Local Significance in Almaty was approved, simultaneously with which all previous decisions on this subject were declared invalid. In this decree, the status of the former Kazpotrebsoyuz administrative building as a monument of local importance was preserved. The boundaries of the protection zones were approved in 2014.
