= Panfilov Street Promenade =

Esplanade in Almaty, Kazakhstan

Coordinates: 43.262°N 76.944°E

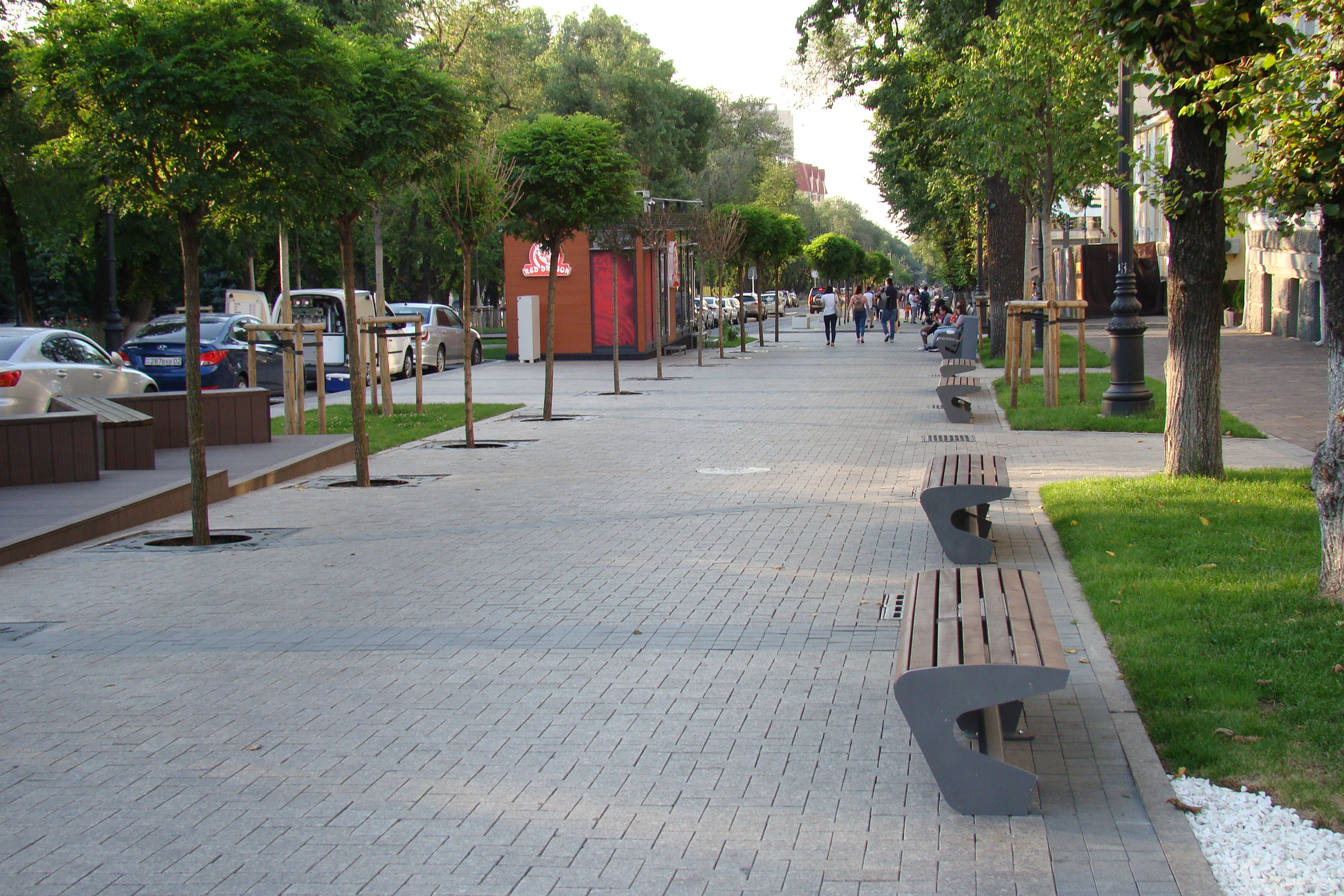
- View of Panfilov Street Promenade
- Interactive map of Panfilov Street Promenade
- Length: 0.84 mi (1.35 km)
- Location: Almaty, Kazakhstan

Construction
- Construction start: June 2017
- Completed: 19 September 2017

Panfilov Street Promenade is a promenade located in Almaty, Kazakhstan. The Abay Opera House, where the promenade starts, and KBTU Building are located within it, which was redesigned by Danish urban designer Jan Gehl. The promenade ends in Arbat.

== History ==
The Almaty City Maslihat was responsible for the large-scale reconstruction of the Almaty's historical city center. The renovation on Panfilov Street took place from the State Academic Theater of Opera and Ballet to Abay Opera House. Officials said that before the creation of the project, they studied numerous pedestrian boulevards around the world, using Barcelona's Ramblas as the main reference for the project. The promenade is predominantly a pedestrian area. However, it does include a narrow passage designed for special transport. The promenade also includes a few parking spaces, street houses, numerous cafes, and summer terraces.

The new construction is predominantly made of granite tiles, and the project involved renovating old buildings and redesigning the pedestrian area, recreational areas, playgrounds, benches, tree planting and a series of dry fountains.

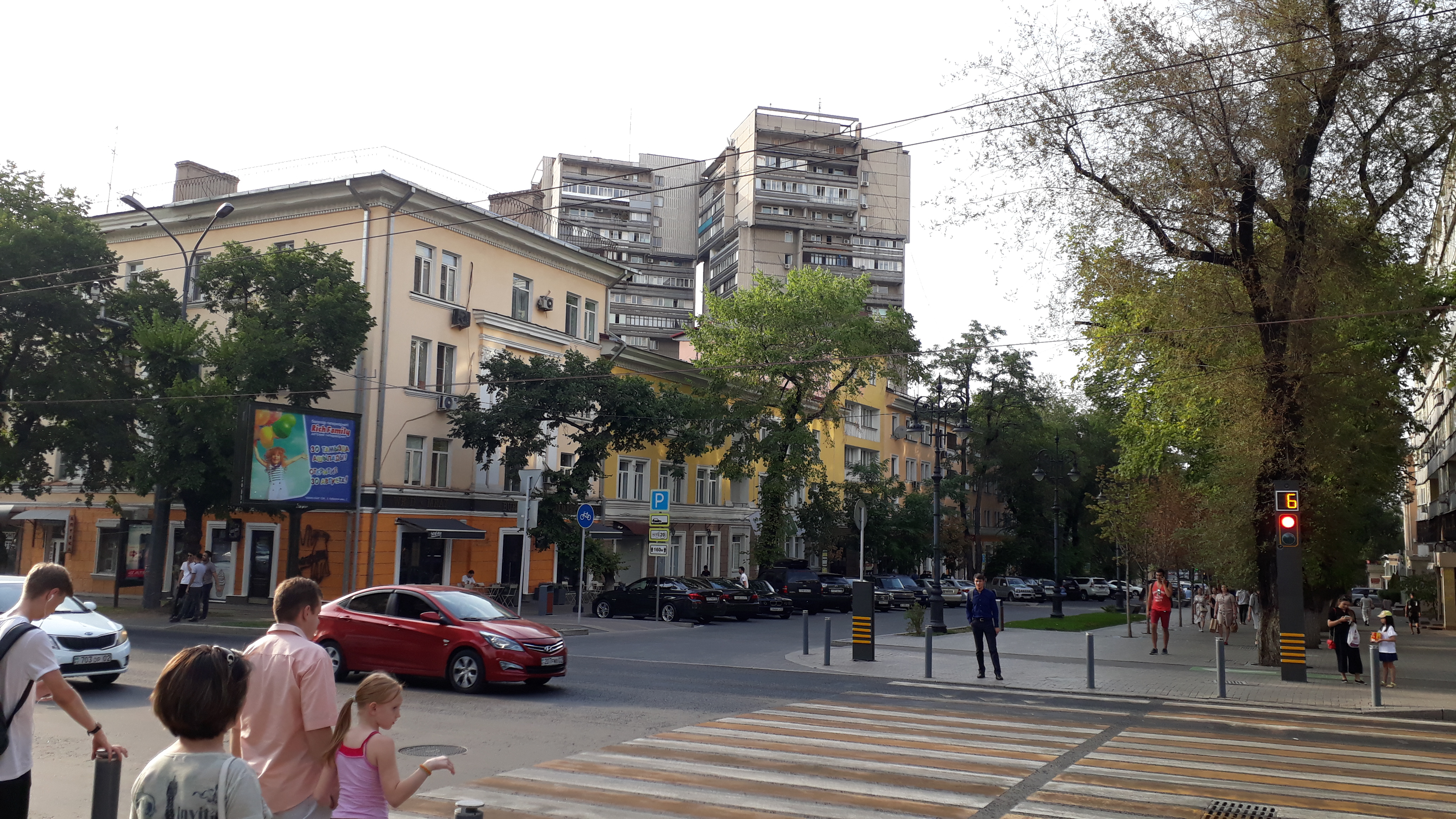
Intersection of Gogol and Panfilov Street

In June 2017, as the reconstruction of the promenade was taking place, a cobblestone pavement from the 1930s was discovered underneath Panvilov Street's asphalt surface. According to architecture historian Almas Ordabayev, the find was part of the square located in front of the Government House building of KazSSR (built by Moses Ginzburg between 1928 and 1931). The new-found cobblestone pavement was saved and used as part of the reconstruction of the promenade. Ordabayev stated that:

"This paving stone was part of the former government square. This square was held in front of the first government building in Almaty, which now houses the Zhurgenov Academy of Arts. It covered the site not only in front of the building itself, but also the street of Kirov (now Bogenbai Batyr)." The construction was completed on 19 September 2017.

== See also ==
- Abay Opera House
- KBTU Building
