= Republic Square, Almaty =

Main square in Almaty, Kazakhstan

Republic Square
- Respublika Alañy (Kazakh)
- New Square; Independence Square
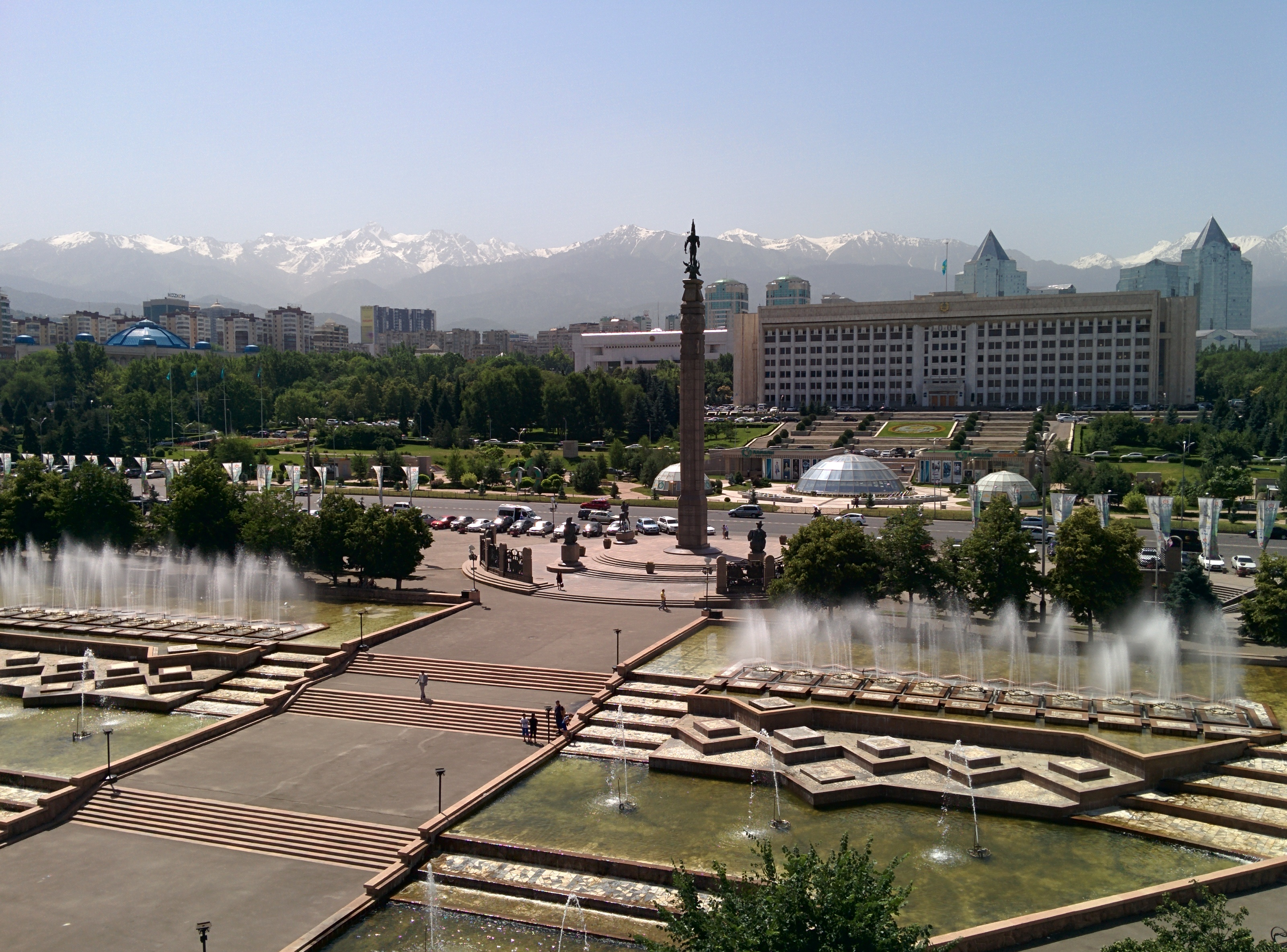

- Location within Kazakhstan
- 43°14′18″N 76°56′43″E
- Location: Almaty, Kazakhstan

History
- Built: 1980

Republic Square (Kazakh: Республика алаңы, Respublika Alañy, Russian: Площадь Республики, romanized: Ploshchadʹ Respubliki), also known as Independence Square (Kazakh: Тәуелсіздік алаңы, romanized: Täuelsızdık alañy; Russian: Площадь Независимости) or New Square (Kazakh: Жаңа алаң, romanized: Jaña alañ; Russian: Новая площадь) is the main square in Almaty, Kazakhstan. It is used for public events. The former presidential palace, later used as municipal offices, sat on its south side until 2022.

== History ==
The area was created by the decision of the First Secretary of the Central Committee of Communist Party of Kazakhstan Dinmukhamed Kunayev, since an increase in population of the city, the Lenin Square during festival events could not accommodate all the residents of the city. The area opened in 1980 under the name Brezhnev Square (after Leonid Brezhnev) in honor of the 60th Anniversary of the founding of the Kazakh Republic. It has become the main square of the capital of Kazakhstan and until the collapse of the Soviet Union it was a place for mass demonstrations, celebrations, festivals, military parades, rallies, festivals. The area was planted with deciduous and coniferous trees. In 1981, Kunayev and party workers planted 70 Tien Shan firs along the walkway area.

In 1982, the authors of the square, for the second and last time in the history of Kazakh architecture, received the State Prize of the USSR in the field of architecture.

In 1986, an infamous uprising known as Jeltoqsan occurred in the square. Where a group of crowd gathered to protest over Kunayev's dismissal. The events lasted from 16 December until 19 December 1986. The protests began in the morning of 17 December, as a student demonstration attracted thousands of participants as they marched through Brezhnev Square across to the CPK Central Committee building. As the result, internal troops and OMON forces entered the city, violence erupted throughout the city which around 200 people were killed.

In 1992, the basic, most important and favorite holiday was celebrated in the square. For the first time began to celebrate Nauryz. Unlike before, during Perestroika where the holiday was only allowed to celebrate at the Lenin Square. Every year on 22 March, from morning to midnight thousands of Almaty residents came to the square to celebrate the national holiday of the vernal equinox - Nauryz. In the square, every year on March 22, tents were put out, which sold baursaks, leather, rice and soft drinks. Festive concerts were also held by famous Kazakh stars.

Parades in honor of the 50th anniversary of the victory in the Second World War and the 5th anniversary of the Independence of Kazakhstan took place on the square on 9 May 1995 and 16 December 1996 respectively.

In 2007, the square began construction of underground shopping and entertainment center, which demolished granite platform. Because of the construction zone, 60% of the area was closed by a fence, a large number of the Tien Shan fir trees were cut down, the movement of vehicles became limited. Before 2012, a symbol of independence for all Kazakhs - the Republic Square was disfigured by pits and wells. Residents negatively reacted to the construction, as the celebration of Nauryz was impossible for it to be held.

In 2012, the construction of the underground shopping center was finally over, however the celebration of Nauryz was still restricted until 2014 which the celebration was finally allowed.

During the Bloody January unrest in 2022, the mayor's offices that were located at Republic Square, along with the former Presidential Residence, were raided by protesters, with the buildings being set on fire and largely damaged. It has been announced that instead of repairing the mayor's office and President's Residence, they will be demolished and replaced by an amusement park and public park, respectively.

In December 2022, the Tagzym Memorial was dedicated to the victims of the violence, both the 227 civilians and the eighteen members of the security forces who were killed, and the hundreds more who were wounded. The Memorial is located on the eastern side of the complex, just south of Satpaev Street, near the giant Oak of Independence. It consists of a series of rectangular monoliths in black, gray and white stone with information about the incident and its victims in gilded lettering. It was unveiled by President Kassym-Jomart Tokayev.

== List of architectural monuments ==
External videos
- Opening of the Independence Monument - 1996

The area previously had a status of state monuments of architecture and urban planning. In 2015, it was ruled into the State list of historical and cultural monuments of local importance in Almaty.

- Akimat of Almaty Residence (the former Communist Party of Kazakhstan)
- Residence of the First President of Kazakhstan (former Presidential Palace of Kazakhstan from 1991-1997, demolished in 2022)
- Republican Schoolchildren's Palace (the former Republican Palace of Pioneers)
- Independence Monument
- Tagzym Memorial

== Name ==
From 1980, the area was named as New Square, in 1982 the area was renamed to Brezhnev Square as a tribute to the death of Leonid Brezhnev. On April 1, 1988 a published decree of the Central Committee of the CPSU, the Presidium of the USSR Supreme Soviet and the USSR Council of Ministers changed the name from Leonid Brezhnev back to New Square again. On May 23, 1990, the Supreme Council of the Kazakh Soviet Socialist Republic adopted a resolution to rename New Square to Republic Square.

== Gallery ==
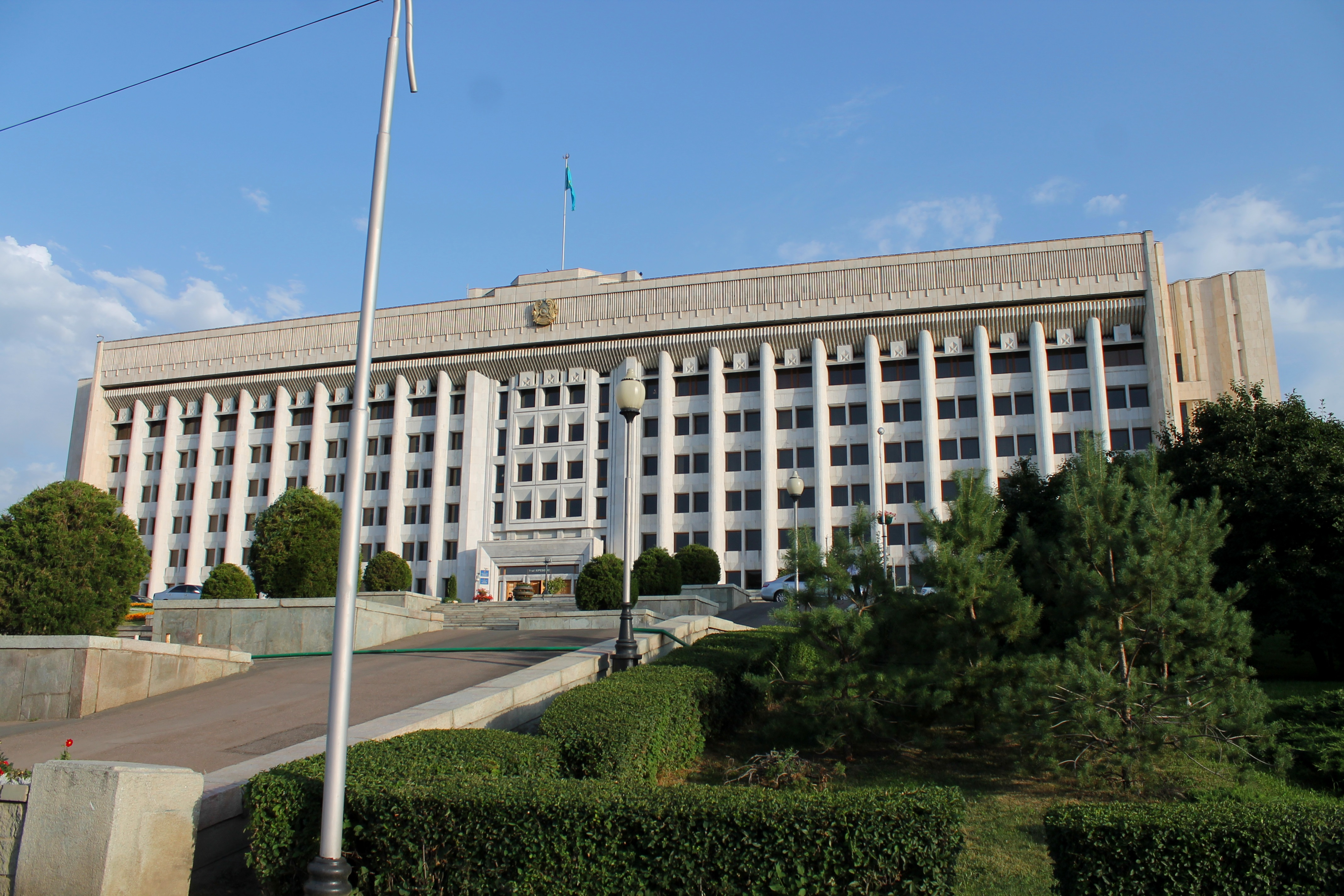
Akimat (Mayor) Residence.

Republic Square at night.

Fountains in Republic Square.

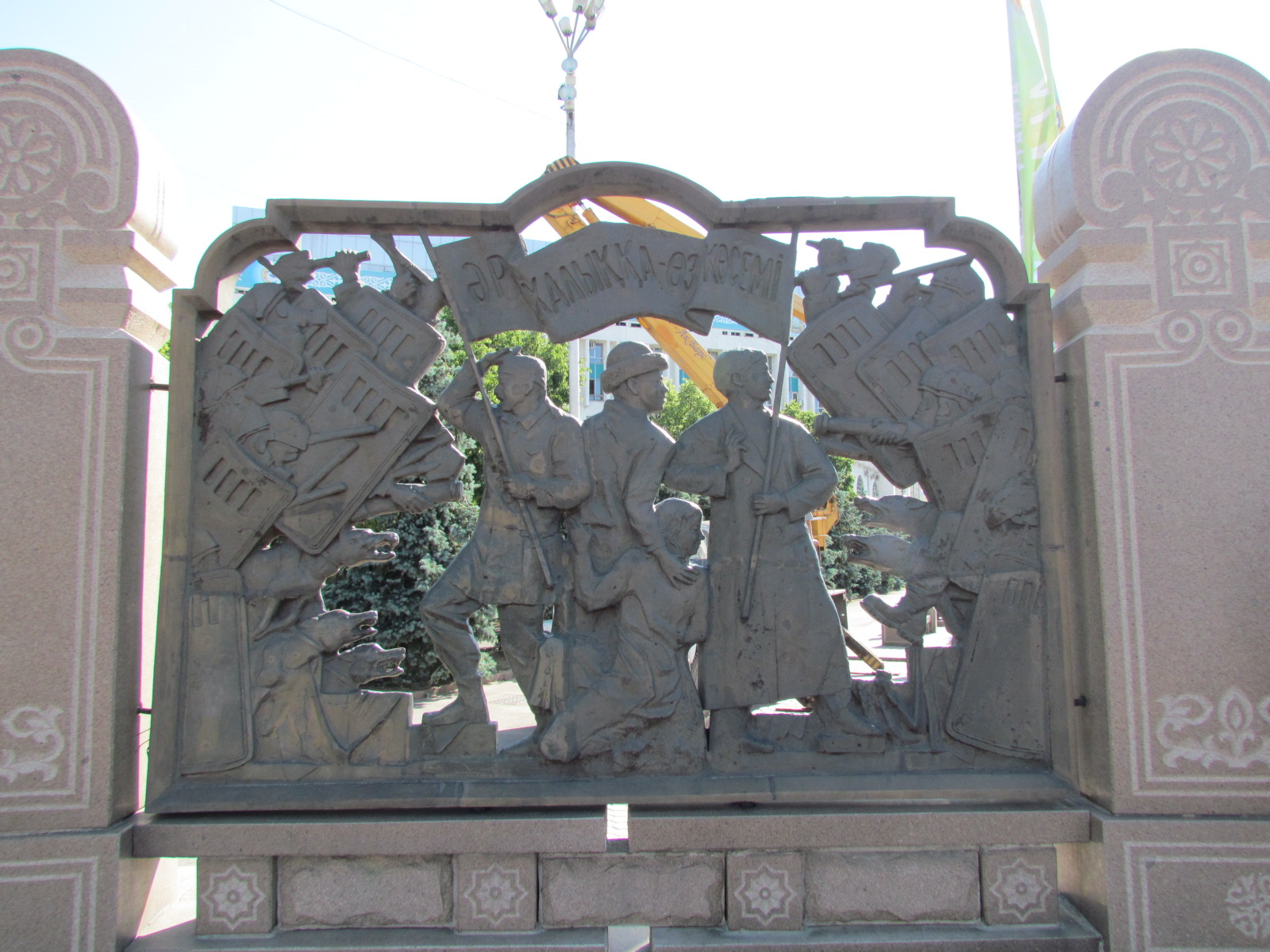
Jeltoqsan monument.
