= Golden Warrior Monument =

Monument in Almaty, Kazakhstan

- Kazakh: Altan Adam
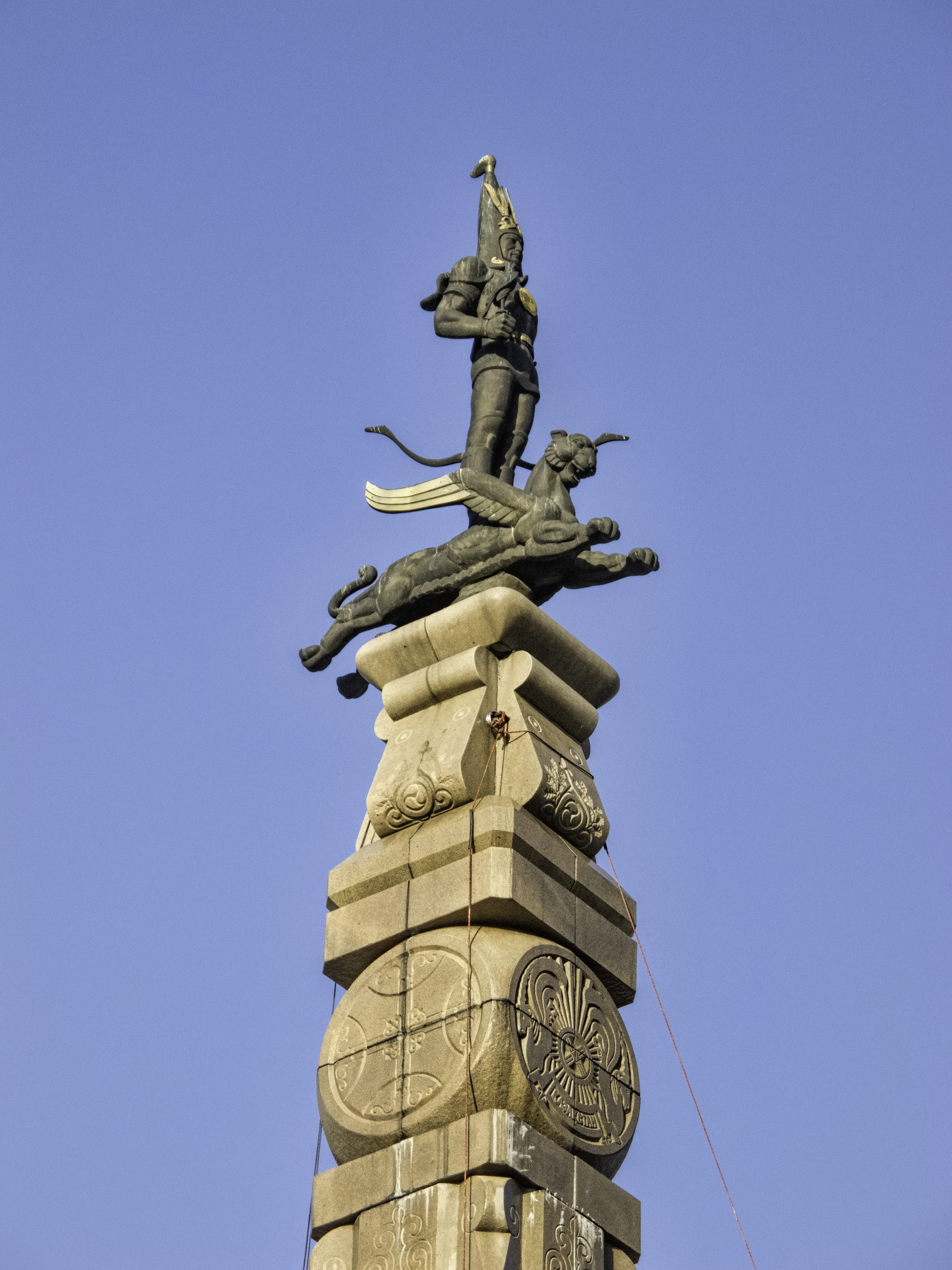
- Interactive map of Golden Warrior Monument
- Location: Almaty, Kazakhstan
- Coordinates: 43°14′18.8″N 76°56′44″E
- Type: Statue
- Material: Bronze
- Completion date: 2006
- Opening date: yes
- Dedicated to: The independence of the state of Kazakhstan

The Golden Warrior Monument (also known as the Golden Man Statue, Statue of the Golden Warrior and Independence Monument) stands on Republic Square in the former capital of Kazakhstan, Almaty. The monument celebrates the independence of Kazakhstan, the identity of its people, and the role of the city of Almaty as capital of Kazakhstan until 1997 when the capital moved to Astana. The statue, a Saka warrior and a barys, stands atop a 91 feet (28 m) tall column.

The design of the monument was inspired by Kazakh folklore and the 1969 archaeological discovery of an 18 year old Second or Third century BC Saka or Scythian noble buried in a golden suit of armor with a sizable hoard of gold, earning him the moniker "Golden Man" (Russian: Zolotoi Chelovek).

The column is framed with artistic casting crate, which describes the historical events of Kazakhstan.

== History ==
On 5 July 1994, the President and members of the Government of the newly formed Republic issued a positive resolution on the construction of a Monument to the Independence of Kazakhstan. On 13 July 1995, Resolution of the President of the Republic of Kazakhstan Nursultan Nazarbayev ‘On the construction of the Monument to the Independence of Kazakhstan in Almaty’ inaugurated it.

In October 2007, someone stole a statue of a bronze book attached to the monument, which contained the palm print of the President of Kazakhstan, following an ancient Kazakh custom. The book was restored three weeks later using a model left at the Kirov Plant, which was in charge of its construction.

In 2019, the Golden Warrior after whom the monument is named was reburied, in the hope that future scientific advances may improve knowledge about it; for example, it is suspected that the warrior may be a woman. [1] The warrior's armour, however, is still on display.

== Architecture ==
The exposition of the complex stretches horizontally for 180 meters. The center of the composition is a vertical plastic stele, reminiscent of the relief Mangyshlak kulpytas, and has a height of 28 meters. It ends with the "Golden Man" (6 meters in height) - the ruler, who stands controlling the winged leopard and symbolizes the firm state power on the Kazakh land. The stele is mounted on a semicircular pedestal, which is placed in the center of a paved circular platform. The stele fixes a certain point in space, being placed against the background of two high-rise buildings. The closer you get to it, the sharper and more dynamic it rushes into the sky. At the bottom of the stele are carved the words (in Kazakh and Russian): "On December 25, 1990, the state sovereignty of Kazakhstan was proclaimed." "December 16, 1991 State Independence of Kazakhstan was proclaimed".

At the foot of the stele, on the stylobate is a sculptural group consisting of allegorical figures of the "Sage of the Sky", "Mother Earth" and two children on foals. The figures are placed on the four sides of the world, from where the life-giving moisture that makes the earth fruitful comes. The child riders symbolize youth and the great future of the republic. On the other hand, the father, mother and children make up the family, the foundation of the state. These figures are inscribed in a square, representing stability and strength.

The column is framed by trims of artistic castings on which the historical events of Kazakhstan are described. On both sides of the stele in a horseshoe shape, in a circle, are placed 10 bas-reliefs, which reveal the history of Kazakhstan from ancient times to the present day. The number 10 is not accidental: according to Pythagoras, it is the number of prosperity, well-being, strength and power. Of course, this is not a chronological order of events, but the artistic and plastic expression of its individual striking stages.

== Gallery ==
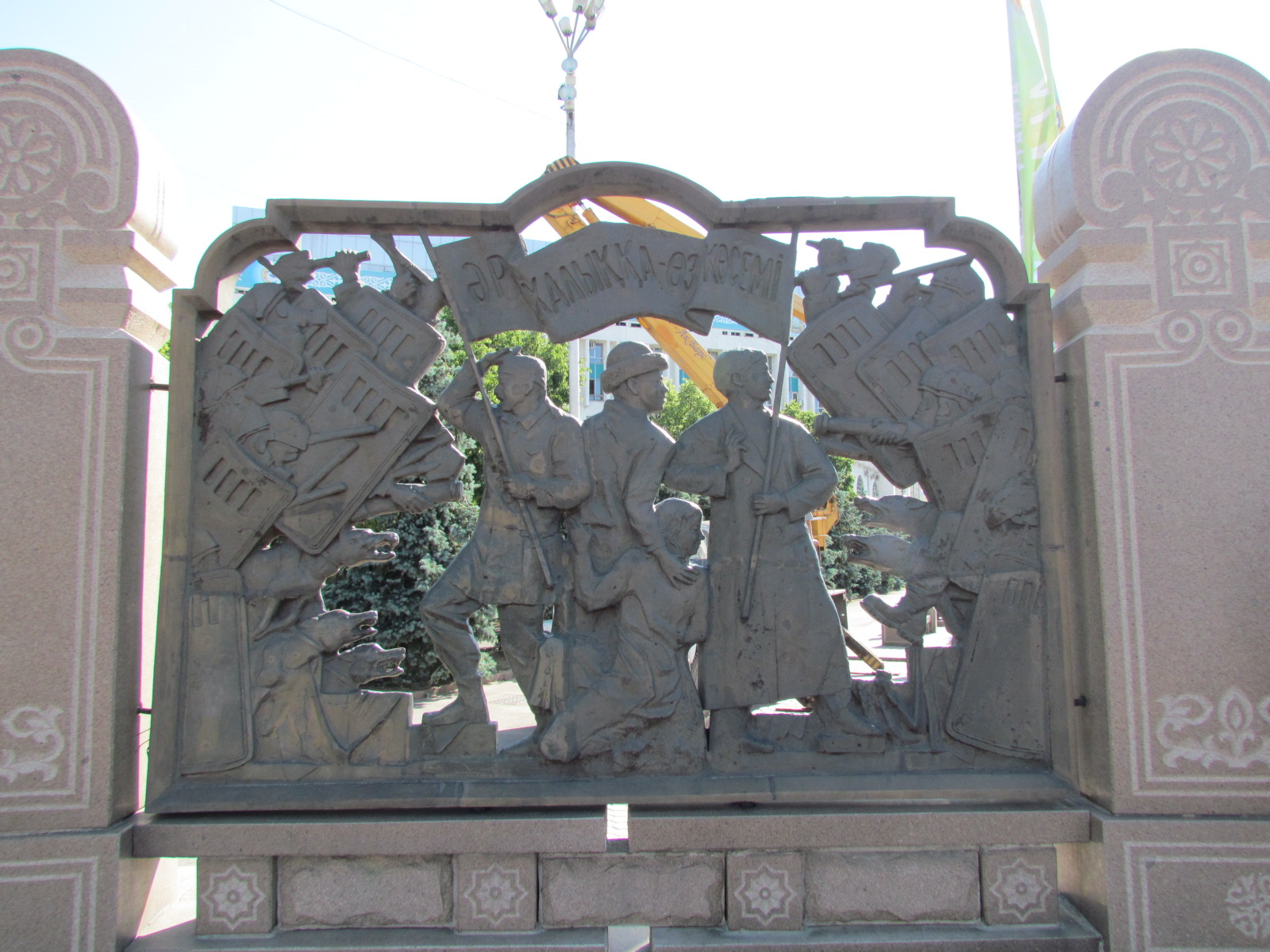
One of the ten bas-reliefs surrounding the monument commemorating the December 1986 events.

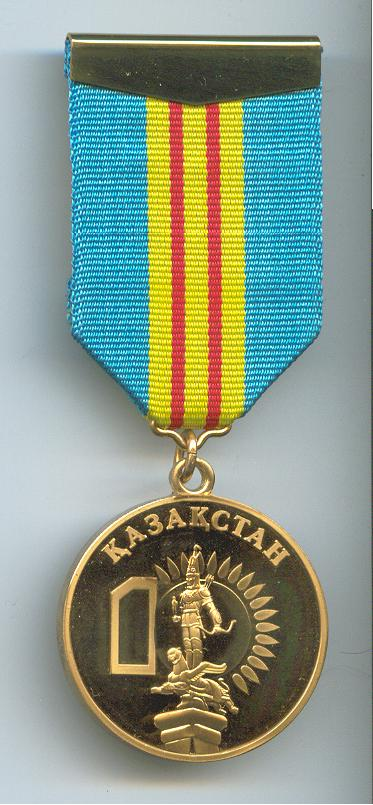
The image of the upper part of the monument on the jubilee medal in honor of the 10th anniversary of independence of the Republic of Kazakhstan

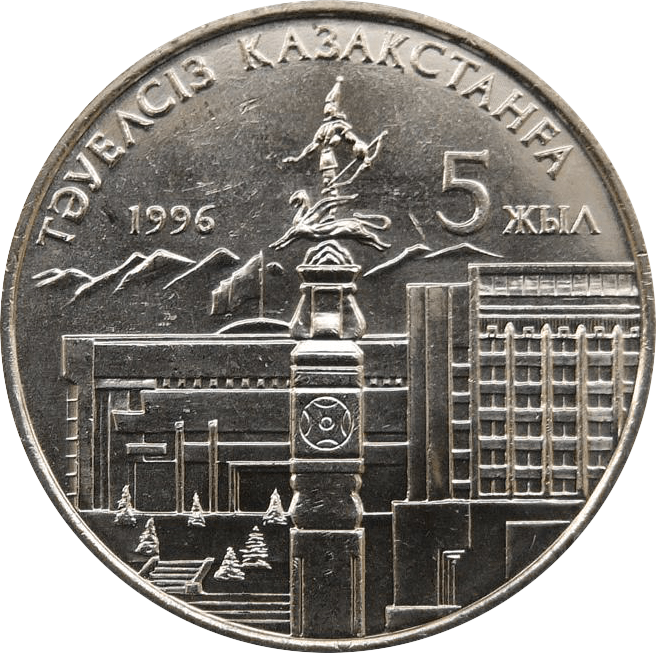
Image of the monument on a commemorative 20 tenge coin dedicated to the 5th anniversary of independence of the Republic of Kazakhstan

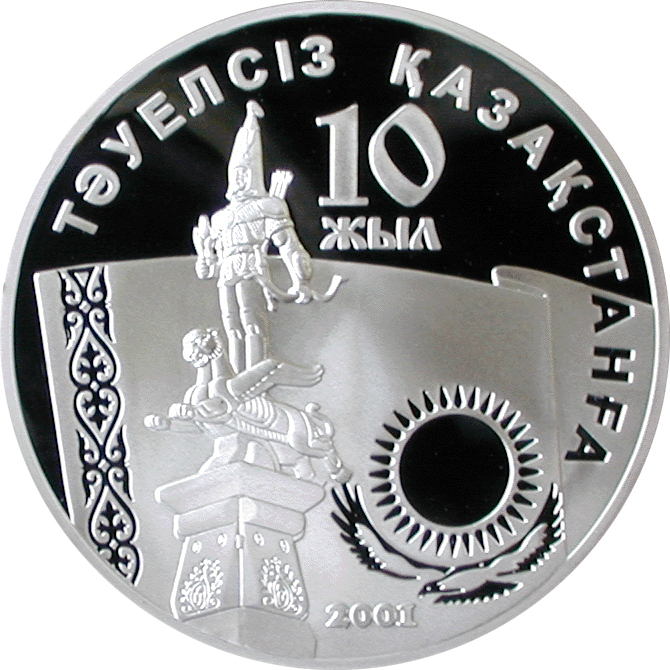
The image of the monument on a commemorative silver coin in 500 tenge, dedicated to the 10th anniversary of independence of the Republic of Kazakhstan
