= Kazakh-British Technical University =

Kazakh research and educational institution

- Kazakh: Қазақстан-Британ техникалық университеті Qazaqstan-Brıtan tehnıkalyq ýnıversıteti Russian: Казахстанско-Британский технический университет
- Type: Public
- Established: 2001
- Rector: Gabdullin Maratbek
- Students: 7746
- Location: Almaty, Kazakhstan

University rankings

Global – Overall
- QS World: 1001-1200 (2025)

Regional – Overall
- QS Asia: =230 (2025)
- QS Emerging Europe and Central Asia: 100 (2022)

Kazakh-British Technical University (KBTU) is a public university located in Almaty, Kazakhstan. It was founded in 2001. KBTU’s research is focused in the main sectors of the Kazakhstani economy – oil and gas, information technologies, banking and finance, management and telecommunications.

== History ==
The idea of creating Kazakh-British Technical University was conceived by the former President of the Republic of Kazakhstan, Nursultan Nazarbayev. Further discussions on the establishment of the University were held during President Nazarbayev’s official visit to the United Kingdom in November 2000. A Memorandum of Understanding was signed between the officials of the two countries on enhancing cooperation in education, science and technology fields.

The Kazakh-British Technical University JSC was established by the Government of the Republic of Kazakhstan on August 3, 2001 under Decree No. 1027.

Since 2003, NC KazMunay Gas JSC has been the sole shareholder of KBTU JSC (Resolution of the Government of the Republic of Kazakhstan No. 987 dated September 26, 2003). However, in 2018, a Public Foundation “Education Fund of Nursultan Nazarbayev” purchased shares of the Kazakh-British Technical University. The privatization took place following the Government of Kazakhstan’s Privatization Program that was approved by a Government’s order No. 1141 on December 30, 2015.

Since 2005, KBTU is awarding double undergraduate degrees in partnership with the University of London. Under the program students receive London School of Economics and Political Science and KBTU degrees while studying at the KBTU in Almaty.

In 2010 and 2011, KBTU received 100 percent shares of two historical and prestigious scientific institutions of Kazakhstan, ‘A.B. Bekturov Institute of Chemical Sciences’ that was founded in 1945 and ‘D.V. Sokolsky Institute of Fuel, Catalysis and Electrochemistry’, which was established in 1969.

In 2018, within the framework of the privatization program, the block of shares of the Kazakh-British Technical University was purchased by the Public Fund Nursultan Nazarbayev Education Fund, in accordance with the Decree of the Government of the Republic of Kazakhstan No. 1141 dated 12/30/2015.

== International links ==
Dual-degree diploma programs with:

- London School of Economics, UK
- Geneva Business School, Switzerland
- University of Northampton, UK
- IFP Energies Nouvelles, French Institute of Petroleum, France

Student exchange programs with:

- University Campus Suffolk, UK
- University of Northampton, UK
- Soongsil University, South Korea
- Sejong University, South Korea
- Asia Pacific University of Technology and Innovation, Malaysia
- Technological University of Malaysia
- Universiti Sains Malaysia
- University of Salerno, Italy

International Partners:

- In 2009 KBTU was awarded the “Affiliate Center” status by the University of London
- In 2011 KBTU became an official affiliate University with the Center for Strategy and Competitiveness at Harvard Business School
- Partnerships with more than 30 universities worldwide
