= President's Residence, Almaty =

Demolished building in Almaty, Kazakhstan

President's Residence of the Republic of Kazakhstan
- Қазақстан Республикасының Президенті Резиденциясы
- Interactive map of the President's Residence of the Republic of Kazakhstan area

General information
- Status: Demolished
- Location: Almaty, Kazakhstan
- Coordinates: 43°14′4″N 76°56′51″E
- Opened: 1995
- Demolished: 2022
- Client: President of Kazakhstan

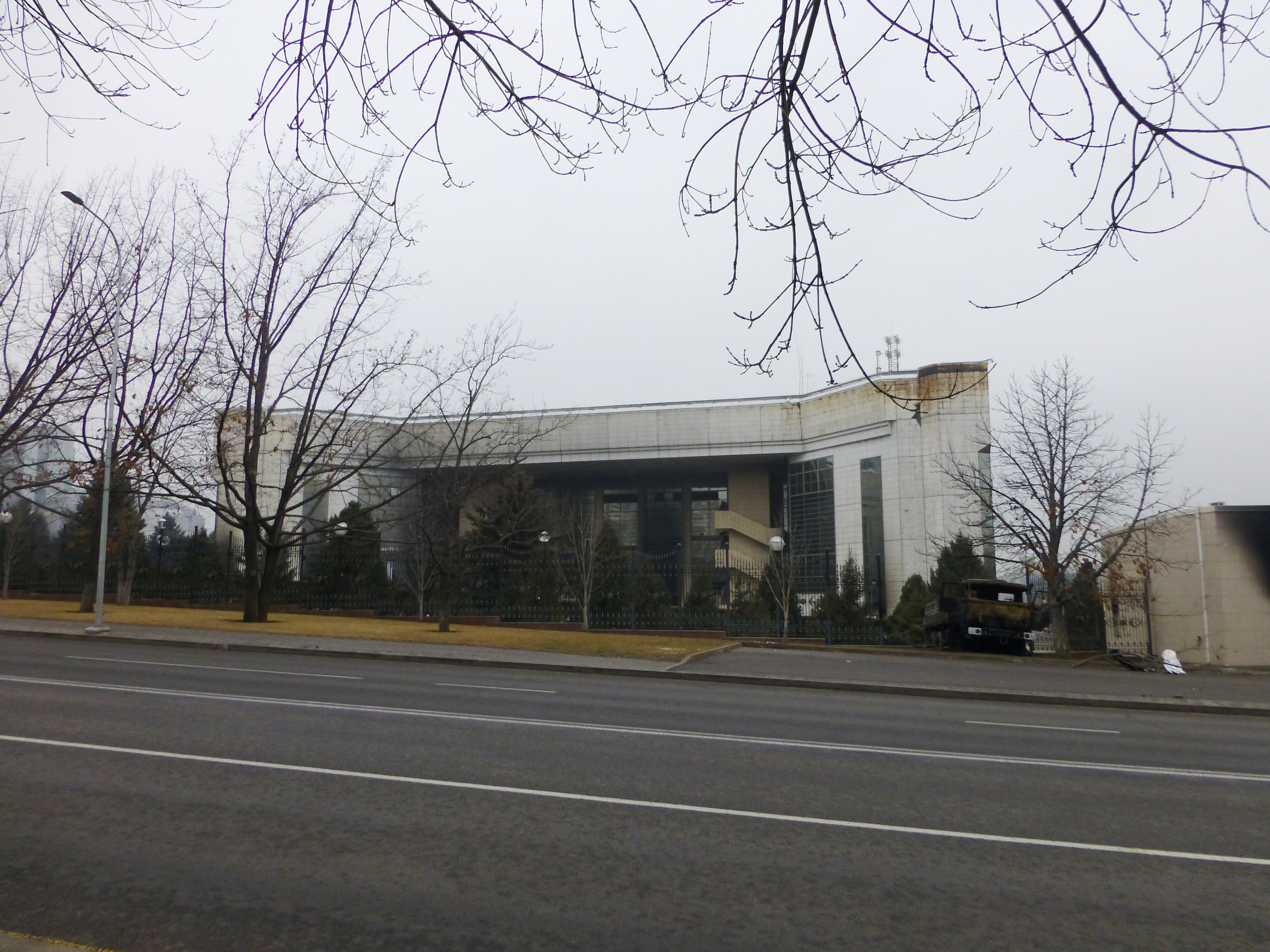
President's Residence after being stormed by protesters during the unrest in Almaty, 10 January 2022

The President's Residence of the Republic of Kazakhstan (Kazakh: Қазақстан Республикасының Президенті Резиденциясы, romanized: Qazaqstan Respublikasynyñ Prezidentı Rezidentsiiasy) was a monument of architecture, history and culture, located in the former capital of Kazakhstan, Almaty, on Nursultan Nazarbayev Avenue.

== History ==
The building was designed as a complex for the Lenin Museum. Due to political unrest in 1986, the construction of the facility was suspended. At that point, the building was 90% completed.

In 1993, construction resumed but the purpose of the building changed: it was instead to be built as a residence for the President of Kazakhstan. The construction was completed in 1995. After the capital of the country was moved to Astana, the building retained the status of a residence. It additionally housed municipal offices.

The area adjacent to the building has been a traditional venue for picketing and protests.

In January 2022, the residence was stormed and set on fire by people protesting against the nation's rising fuel prices, resulting in most of the building largely destroyed. Though plans were initially made to fully restore it, it was found that the structure was not up to current codes and eliminating the smell of burning was not possible. Ultimately, President Kassym-Jomart Tokayev made the decision to demolish the building and replace it with a public park and demolition took place later in the year. Construction on the new park fully began in September 2025.

== Architecture ==
The building was designed as a monumental structure, the large-span roof of which rested on four angular volume-structural supports. The spatial solution of the new residence gave maximum freedom to work with the architecture of the facades and flexibility of the internal multi-level planning structure.

The facade of the Residence was finished with white carrara marble, which was contrastingly combined with dark blue stained-glass windows.

The interiors of the building were decorated with Kazakh classical ornament, the motives of which were repeated in the organization of the internal space. The round dome of the Reception Hall was framed with a relief drawing based on the Kargalin diadem.

On the west side of the Residence, a park was laid out, in which there was a place for works of modern art.

== Monumental status ==
On 16 October 2000, the Residence complex was included in the register of historical and cultural monuments of Kazakhstan of republican significance.

== See also ==
- Ak Orda Presidential Palace
