= Bore =

Bore or Bores often refer to:

- Boredom
- Drill

== Relating to holes ==
- Boring (earth), cutting a hole into the earth
- Boring (manufacturing), a machining process that enlarges a hole
  - Bore (engine), the diameter of a cylinder in a piston engine or a steam locomotive
  - Bore (wind instruments), the interior chamber of a wind instrument
  - Nominal bore, a pipe size standard
  - Water well, known as a water bore in Australia
- The hollow lumen of a gun barrel
  - Gauge (firearms), the inner diameter of the barrel of a firearm

== Places ==
- Bore (Aanaa), a district of Ethiopia that includes the town of Bore
- Bore, Emilia-Romagna, a commune in Emilia-Romagna, Italy
- Boré, Mali, a village in Dangol Boré commune in the Mopti Region of Mali
- Bore, Norway, a small village in Klepp municipality in Rogaland county, Norway
- Bore Track, a track in the South Australian outback
- Bore Valley, South Georgia, Antarctica

== People ==
- Bore (surname)
- Francisco Bores (1898–1972), Spanish artist

== Maritime shipping ==
- Steamship Company Bore, a Finnish company that operated for a time within Silja Line
  - MS Bore, a car-passenger ferry built in 1960
  - SS Deneb, a cargo ship later renamed Bore VII

== Other uses ==
- Bore War, a contemporary name for the Phoney War (1939–1940), an early phase of World War II
- Tidal bore, a type of tidal wave
- Undular bore, an atmospheric wave disturbance
- Bores, one of the dogs that tore apart Actaeon

== See also ==
- Boar (disambiguation)
- Boer
- Bohr (disambiguation)
- Boor (disambiguation)
- Bored (disambiguation)
- Boredom (disambiguation)
- Boring (disambiguation)
- Drill (disambiguation)
