= Bored (disambiguation) =

Bored refers to a state of boredom.

Bored may also refer to:

- Bored (band), an Australian punk rock band
- "Bored" (Billie Eilish song), a 2017 song by Billie Eilish from the soundtrack album of 13 Reasons Why
- "Bored (Deftones song)", a song by the Deftones from the album Adrenaline, 1995
- "Bored", a song by Death Angel from the album Frolic Through the Park, 1988
- "Bored" (悶), a song by Faye Wong from the album Faye Wong, 1997
- "Bored", a song by Moka Only and Psy from the album Lowdown Suite 2… The Box, 2009
- "Bored", a song by Bea Miller from the album Aurora, 2018
- "Bored", a song by Tessa Violet, with a version featuring MisterWives, from the album Bad Ideas, 2019
- "Bored!", a song by Aespa from the album Synk: Parallel Line, 2024
- "I Am Bored", a song by The Microphones from the album The Glow Pt. 2, 2001

== See also ==
- Bore (disambiguation)
- Boring (disambiguation)
- Boredom (disambiguation)
- Board (disambiguation)
- Drilling (disambiguation)
- Drill (disambiguation)
