= 149th Armored Regiment =

Armored unit of the United States Army

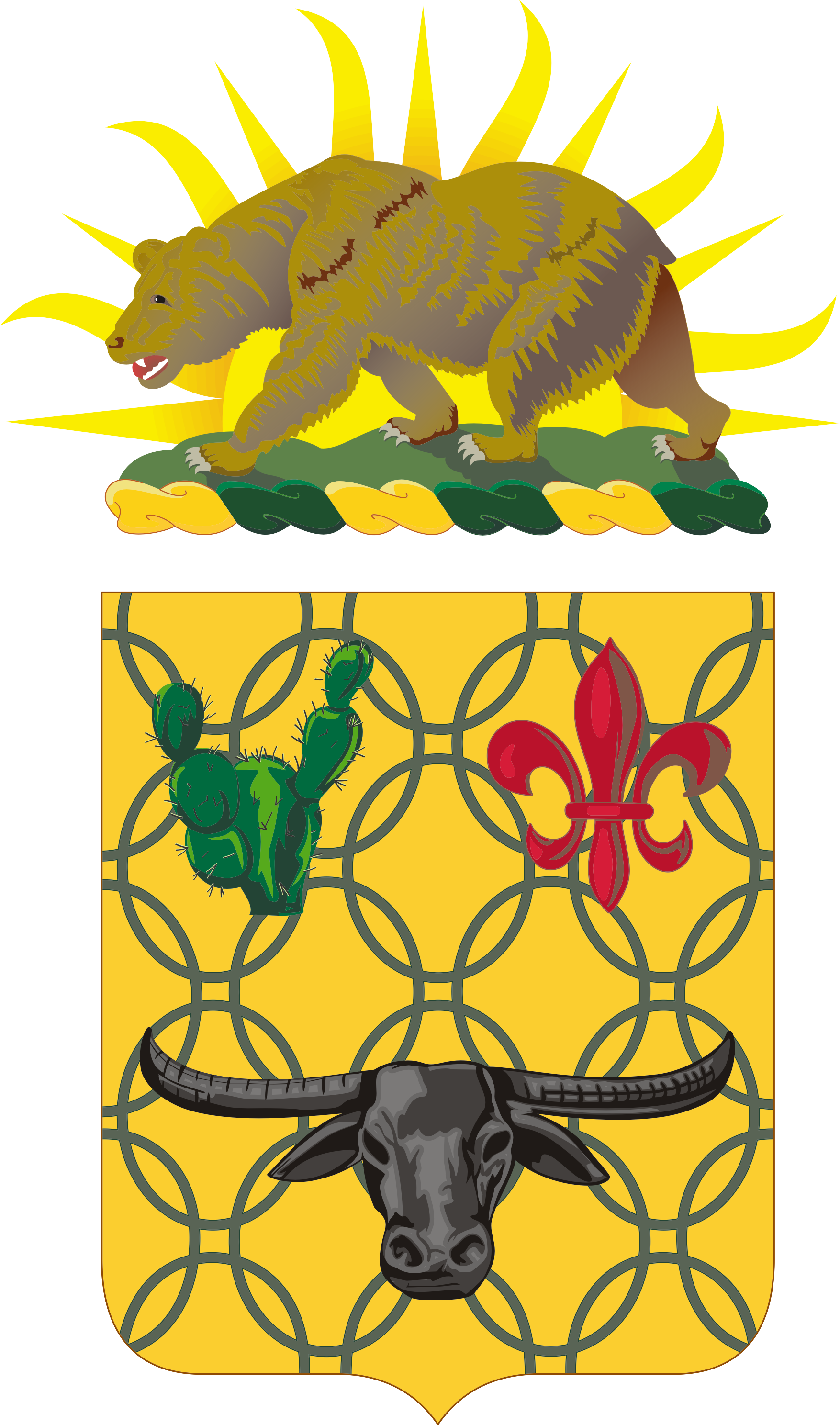
- Coat of arms
- Active: 1959–2007
- Country: United States
- Branch: United States Army
- Type: Armor
- Size: Regiment
- Garrison/HQ: Salinas, CA (1959–96); Presidio of Monterey, CA (1996–99); Seaside, CA (1999–2007)
- Mottos: Men and Steel
- Vehicles: M1917 (1924–1937); M2A2 (1937–1941); M3 (1941–1942); M48 (~1962); M60A3 (~1987–1997); M1IP (1997–2007)
- Engagements: Mexican Border War World War I: Meuse-Argonne Offensive; World War II: Philippines campaign (1941–1942); Kosovo
- Decorations: Presidential Unit Citation (3) Philippine Presidential Unit Citation

Commanders
- Last 1st Battalion commanding officer: LTC Mark Malanka
- Last 1st Battalion senior enlisted advisor: CSM Scott Waterhouse

Insignia
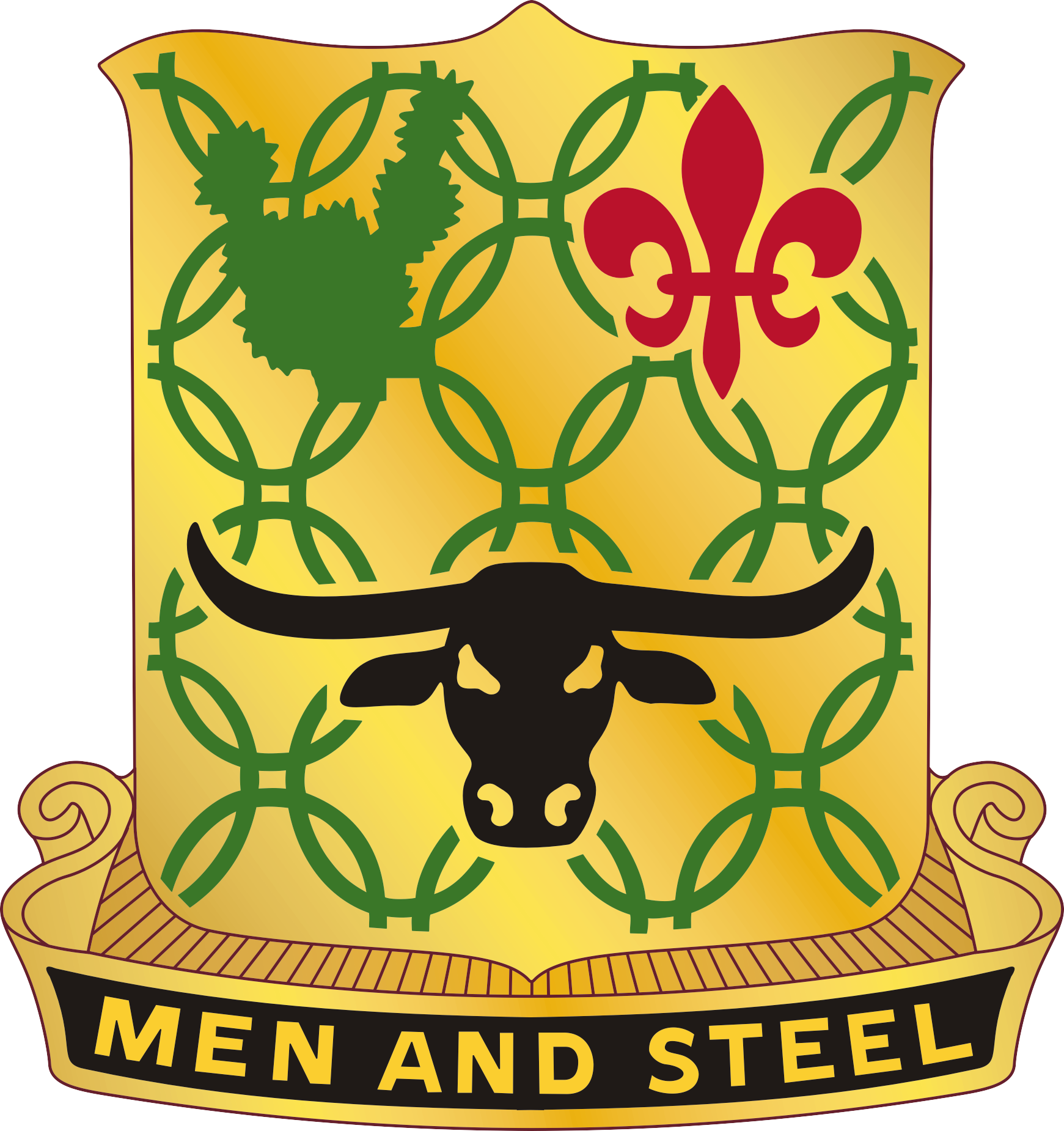
- Distinctive unit insignia

The 149th Armored Regiment was an armored regiment that was part of the California Army National Guard. Its lineage dates back to a cavalry unit organized in 1895 in Salinas. As Troop C, the unit's first major action occurred when it deployed to help in the aftermath of the 1906 San Francisco Earthquake. In 1916, still as Troop C, the unit served along the Mexico–United States border near Nogales, Arizona to deter further border incursions, due to events surrounding the Pancho Villa Expedition. The following year, Troop C was activated then reorganized and redesignated as Company B, 145th Machine Gun Battalion upon the United States' entry into World War I; as part of the 40th Division, the battalion deployed to France in 1918, and returned to the United States in 1919.

In 1924, the unit converted from cavalry into armor, receiving its first tanks, and becoming the 40th Tank Company. In 1934, the company deployed again to San Francisco due to the 1934 West Coast waterfront strike. In February 1941, as Company C, 194th Tank Battalion, the unit was activated for training at Fort Lewis, Washington; later that year in September, the battalion was deployed to the Philippines. When the United States was drawn into World War II by the Japanese attack on Pearl Harbor, from December 1941 until April 1942, the battalion fought against Japanese forces. The company conducted a fighting withdrawal in Southern Luzon; then it fought on Bataan until they were ordered to surrender. As prisoners of war (POW), soldiers of the unit suffered through the Bataan Death March, and were later sent individually to various POW camps throughout the territories controlled by Japan; following the surrender of Japan, surviving soldiers returned to the United States in mid-September 1945.

In 1946, the unit was inactivated, before being redesignated as the 199th Tank Battalion. It was redesignated as the 149th Tank Battalion in 1949, becoming the 149th Armor Regiment a decade later. In 1965, the regiment was sent to Los Angeles in response to the Watts Riots. The unit returned to Los Angeles later in the 20th century, in response to the 1992 Los Angeles riots. Following the September 11th attacks, the unit was activated for Operation Noble Eagle in 2003. Then in 2005, it deployed to Europe for peacekeeping in the Kosovo Force. In 2007, the regiment ceased to be an armored unit via consolidation with the 340th Brigade Support Battalion, retaining the latter unit’s name.

== History ==
=== Cavalry and World War I ===
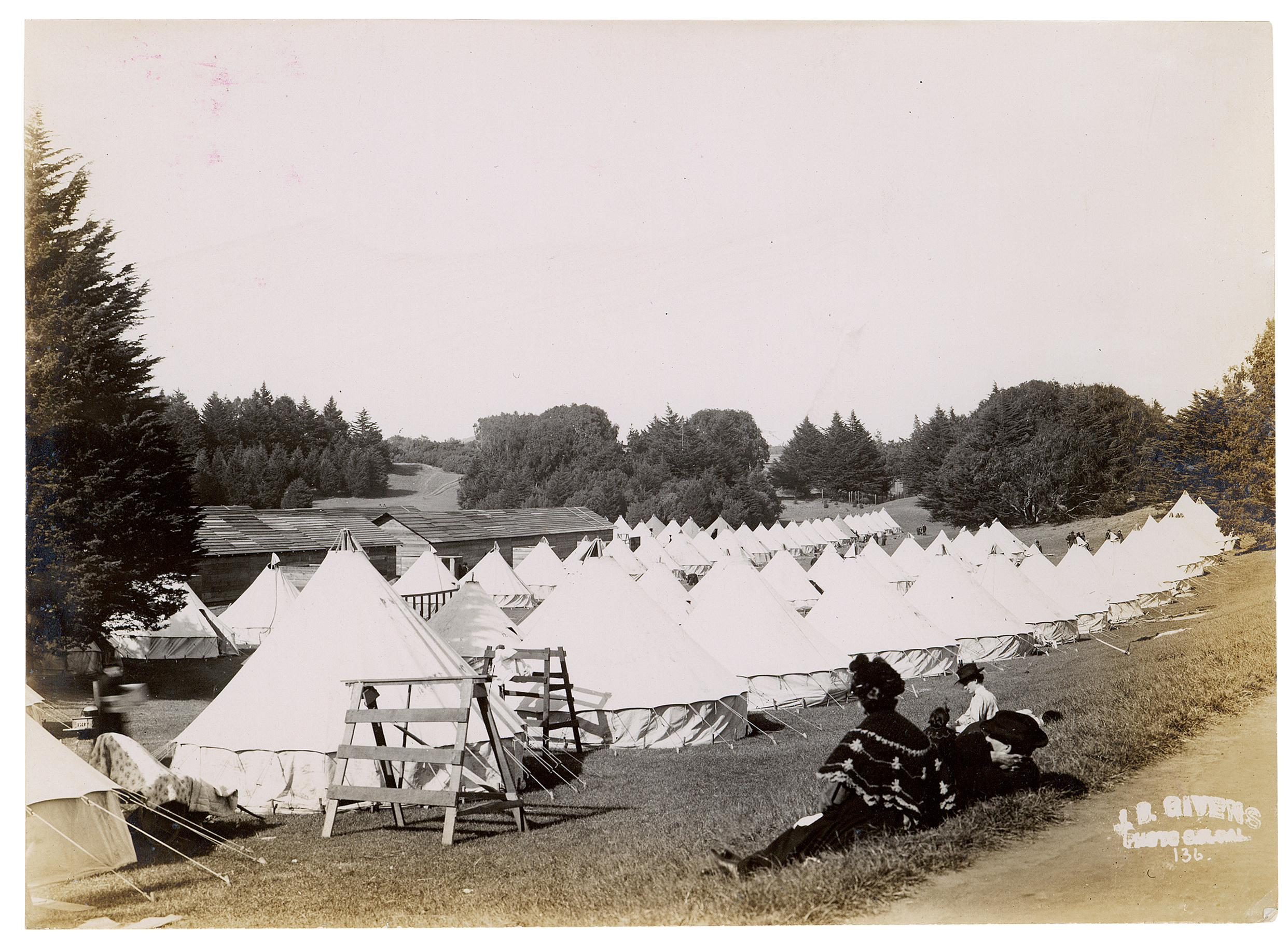
A camp in Golden Gate Park under military control in 1906

Troop C of cavalry, the first unit on the Central Coast region of the National Guard of California, a state militia, was organized on 5 August 1895. The troop's first activation was when it was called up to provide law and order in San Francisco following the earthquake in 1906, using Golden Gate Park as its base of operations. In 1911, the troop was incorporated into the 1st Squadron of Cavalry.

In the early 1910s tensions between Mexico and the United States were high, due to the impact the Mexican Revolution had on the border; this resulted in several events which led to loss of life of citizens of both nations. These tensions came to a head in March 1916, with the attack on Columbus, New Mexico by Mexicans under Pancho Villa. As a result, a punitive expedition by the United States Army was sent into Mexico, and National Guard units were activated in neighboring border states for federal service. With the regular United States Army busy pursuing Pancho Villa, being unable to defend the rest of the border with Mexico, the National Defense Act of 1916 was passed in June, allowing for the activation of additional National Guard units throughout the United States for federal service. In June, the unit was activated for federal service on the Mexican border near Nogales, Arizona. As the threat of cross border hostility abated, the troop was deactivated later that year.

Before, and while the troop was serving on the Mexican border, World War I was being fought. After the United States entered into World War I, the troop was activated into federal service in August 1917 at Camp Kearny in San Diego. There it was redesignated as Company B of the 145th Machine Gun Battalion, as an element of the 40th Division. During this period the battalion was part of the 80th Infantry Brigade of the 40th Division.

The brigade departed for France in August 1918, where it spent the majority of the time training replacements. In late October 1918, the machine gun battalion was sent to Saint-Dizier, then to Baudonvilliers in November. During November 1918, the battalion supported First Army, when it was moved to Marne for the Meuse-Argonne Offensive. Beginning in mid-December, the 40th Division began the process of returning to the United States, ultimately embarking through Bordeaux. In May 1919 it was demobilized at the Presidio of San Francisco.

=== 40th Tank Company ===
The unit was reorganized as the 40th Tank Company for the 40th Division in 1924 and it was equipped with eight French Renault light tanks (M1917); it was California's first tank unit. It conducted its first annual training at Camp Del Monte in 1925. On Thanksgiving Day 1927, two of the units tanks were tasked to respond to a riot at the Folsom State Prison. The company was first activated in response to the 1934 West Coast waterfront strike of longshoremen during which it was sent to San Francisco for eight days. M2A2 light tanks replaced the Renaults in 1937. During the 1930s, training with the unit's tanks did not involve ammunition, and utilized Ford Model T automobiles to simulate enemy tanks. Training was often conducted in association with the 159th Infantry Regiment. April 1937, the company participated in activities on Crissy Field at the Presidio of San Francisco. In August 1937, along with other units of the Fourth Army, the tank company was assigned to the brown force (national guard units) that simulated combat against the blue force (regular army units) in the area between Morro Bay and San Luis Obispo.

=== 194th Tank Battalion ===
In 1940, the company was designated as Company C, 194th Tank Battalion; other tank companies in Brainerd, Minnesota (Company A, formerly the 34th Tank Company), and Saint Joseph, Missouri (Company B, former 35th Tank Company), formed the rest of the battalion. A large number of men in Company C were Salinas High School graduates from the classes of 1938 and 1939. The battalion was mustered into federal service on 10 February 1941, and began training at Fort Lewis, Washington; there, on 22 February, the battalion finally assembled as an entire unit. Rated among the best tank battalions in the Army, the battalion was equipped with 54 new M3 Stuart light tanks.

==== Deployment ====
Company B was detached from the battalion and sent to Alaska; the rest of the battalion boarded the USAT President Coolidge in San Francisco on 8 September, bound for Manila. (Note: Also aboard the Coolidge was the 200th Coast Artillery Regiment from New Mexico, and the Air Corps' 27th Bombardment Group. During the voyage, the Coolidge was escorted by the USS Astoria (CA-34).) It was the first U.S. armored unit to deploy overseas, during World War II. On 26 September 1941 the 194th, along with the 17th Ordnance Company, arrived in Manila, and was then assigned to Fort Stotsenburg, in Sapangbato, Angeles City. There the unit found supplies to be unavailable, especially gasoline and spare parts; worse, ammunition for the tank's 37-millimeter (1.5 in) main gun was never shipped to the Philippines causing the tankers to improvise ammunition in the following campaign. The ammunition would only be armor-piercing, with high-explosive being unavailable. The 192nd Tank Battalion arrived in the Philippines on 20 November; joining with the 194th and the 17th, they formed the 1st Provisional Tank Group, under the command of Brigadier General James Weaver; this unit would go on to become the first organization of the United States to engage enemy tanks in combat. (Note: Yet their sacrifice had not been in vain. From December 1941 to May 1942, the 194th and 192nd Tank Battalions, comprising the 149th Tank Group (Provisional) defended central Luzon and then the Bataan Peninsula from units of the invading Japanese 14th Army. These National Guardsmen were part of the first U.S. tank unit to go overseas in WWII, the first U.S. tank unit to engage the enemy in WWII, and the first U.S. tank unit to engage enemy tanks in the history of the U.S. Armored Force. — "Remember the Road to Bataan: Training for War in a Resource-Short Environment (Reserve Component)")

=== World War II ===
==== Clark Field and withdrawal ====
When the United States was drawn into World War II by the Japanese attack on Pearl Harbor on 7 December 1941, Company C was in defensive positions around Clark Field, where on 8 December the first Japanese attacks occurred leading to the destruction of half of the Far East Air Force; (Note: A United States Army aviation organization composed of units of the United States Army Air Forces, and the Philippine Army Air Corps.) of the nine Japanese fighters shot down that day, Private Earl G. Smith of Company C was credited with downing one of them. Due to this action, the unit became the first California National Guard unit to see combat. Initially, General Douglas MacArthur was confident that the United States Army Forces in the Far East (USAFFE) would be able to defend the entire archipelago under war plan Rainbow Five. Detached from the rest of the battalion on 12 December, Company C was attached to the South Luzon Force. On 13 December, Company C moved to Tagaytay Ridge, attempting to apprehend fifth columnists who had been launching flares near ammunition dumps at night; this would continue until Christmas Eve. On 23 December, with the advances of Japanese forces after landing at Lingayen Gulf dashing his confidence, General MacArthur ordered a reversion to War Plan Orange, ordering all forces to withdraw to the Bataan Peninsula.

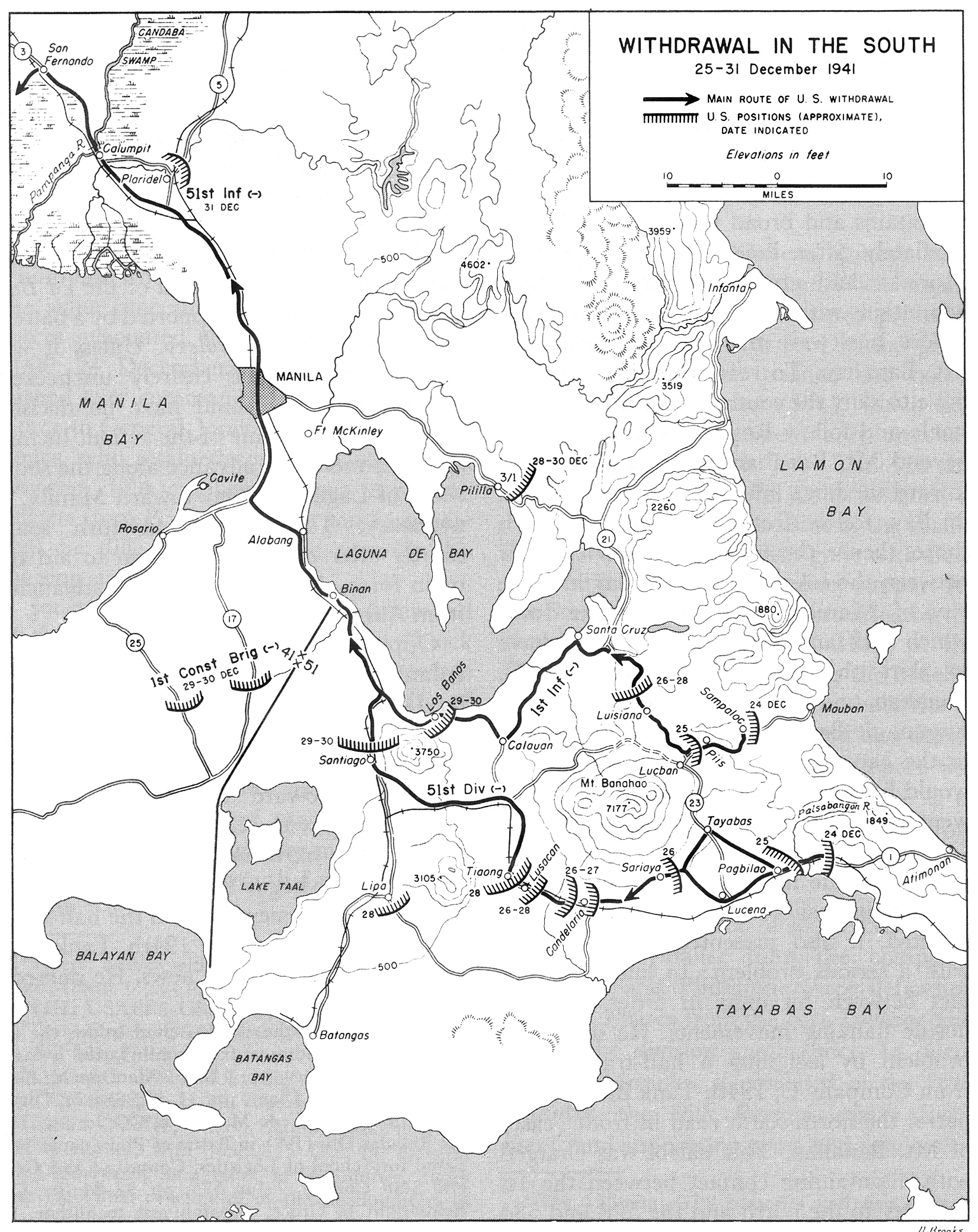
Withdrawal in Southern Luzon, the Philippines in December 1941

Company C was assigned to the area east of Mount Banahao and attached to the Philippine Army 1st Infantry Regiment of the 1st Infantry Division. The commanding general of the South Luzon Force, Brigadier General Albert M. Jones, heard from a motorcycle messenger from Company C on Christmas Day that the 1st Infantry Regiment had prematurely moved westward away from their position at Sampaloc. He then instructed Company C to engage the Japanese who had landed at Mauban. He decided to conduct a reconnaissance himself using a half-track from Company C, and they were engaged by a Japanese patrol north of the town of Piis. During the engagement the half-track became immobilized in a ditch, however the crew was able to disperse the patrol allowing Jones and the crew to carry the half-track's machine guns back to friendly lines. For their action, Jones recommended the crew members receive the Distinguished Service Cross; by the April 1946, when the recommendation was finally processed, the awards were downgraded to Silver Stars and only one of the five crew, Sergeant Leon Elliot, was still alive.

Painting depicting Staff Sergeant Morello's M3 Stuart, smashing into a roadblock and an Imperial Japanese Army anti-tank gun that was behind it.

The next day the second platoon of the company was ordered by a Major Rumbold, senior American instructor of the Philippine Army 1st Infantry Regiment, to attack the Japanese, who were in Piis, down a narrow mountain trail. The platoon leader, Second Lieutenant Robert F. Needham, suggested that a reconnaissance be done before the attack but was told it was unnecessary. Due to the firefight the night before, a roadblock had been prepared by the Japanese, consisting of anti-tank guns, artillery, and several machine guns. The Americans advanced as a column and the lead tank, commanded by Needham, was hit first. The second tank, commanded by Staff Sergeant Emil S. Morello, drove around Needham's disabled tank and ran over a roadblock and an antitank gun behind it, firing upon other Japanese positions before his tank was disabled; in the end five tanks, an entire platoon, were immobilized and lost and five tankers were killed. The Japanese settled in around the tanks that night, believing all the Americans to be dead; as the front moved past them, with the Japanese advancing away from them, which allowed Morello to gather the wounded. Having collected them, he escaped with the help of Filipino guides to Manila, where he left one wounded tanker in a Catholic hospital; with the remainder of the wounded he was able to reach Corregidor by the end of the month. In 1983, Morello was awarded the Silver Star for his actions; he later rejoined the company in Bataan. This action also led the War Department to change from rivets to welding in new tank production.

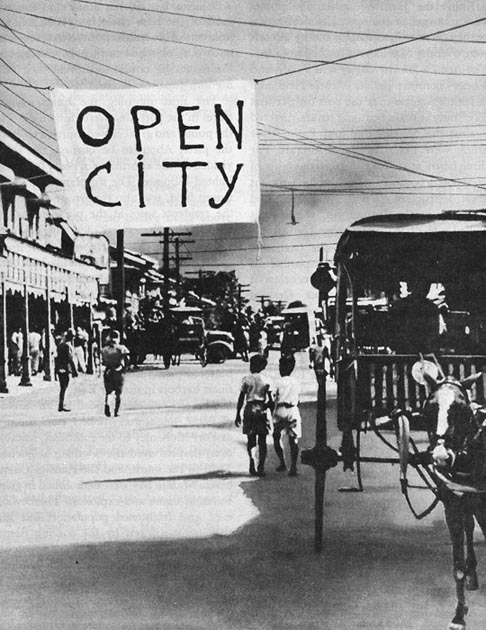
Picture was taken of an open city sign in front of Manila's city hall on 26 December 1941.

Another platoon of Company C was attached to the Philippine Army's 51st Infantry Division, and became part of a covering force for the division's withdrawal. The platoon prepared defensive lines near Sariaya, then Tiaong where it rejoined the rest of the South Luzon Force, minus the Philippine Army's 1st Infantry Division which rejoined the rest of the South Luzon Force at Santiago. From there the force bypassed Manila, which had been declared an open city, withdrawing northward to join the rest of the American-Filipino forces heading to Bataan. However, due to unfamiliarity with the geography, Company C passed through the city, with one of the tanks becoming immobile after hitting the Rizal Monument in the darkness; the crew of the immobilized tank eventually departed the city on Bren Gun Carriers driven by Filipino soldiers.

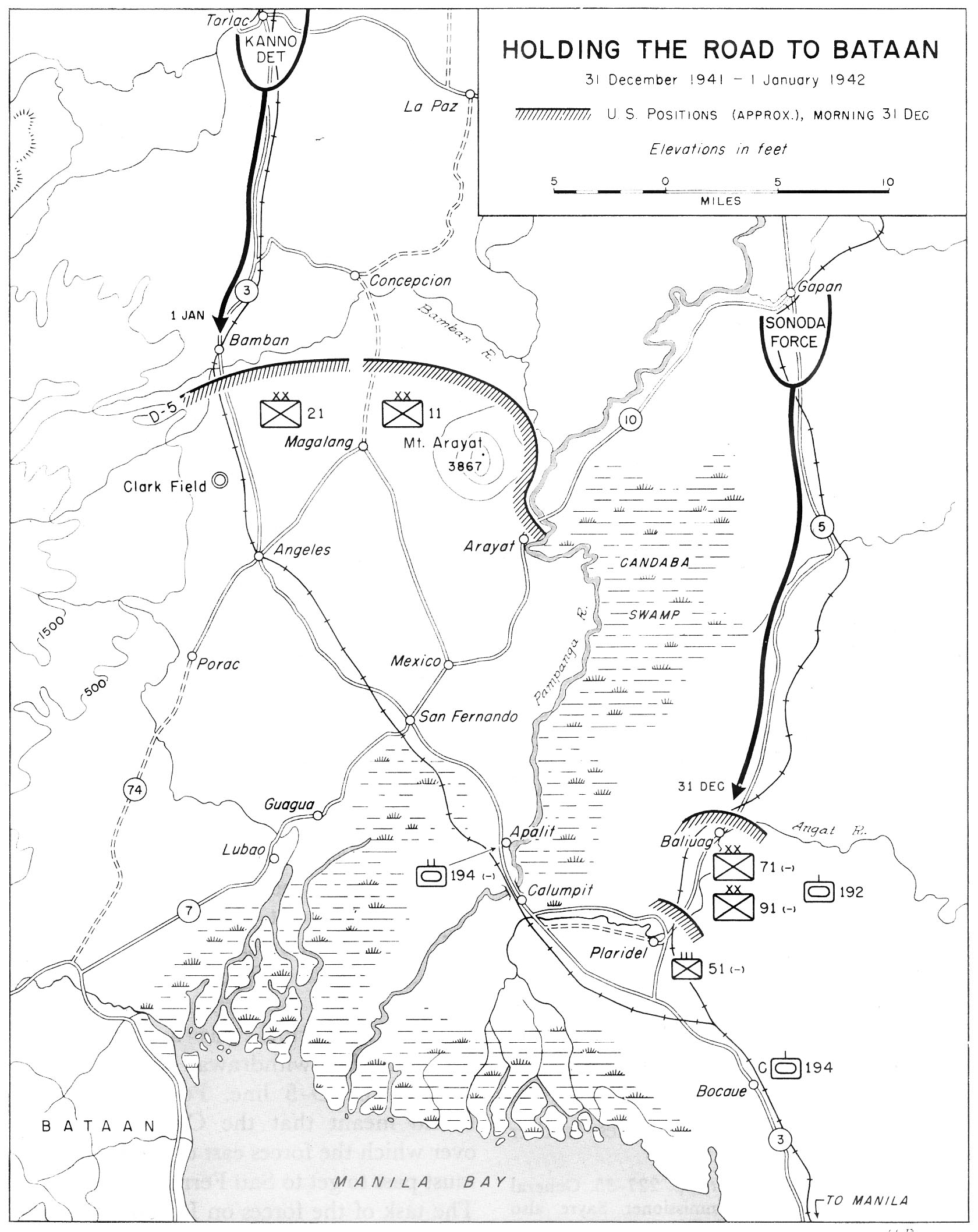
Positions north of Bataan, 31 December 1941 – 1 January 1942.

At Calumpit there were important bridges over the Pampanga River, which connected Bataan to the forces that were now north of Manila. To defend these bridges the 194th took up positions at Apalit, covering the west bank of the river, thus ensuring the path of withdrawal to Bataan for the units defending the bridges. To the south Company C covered the southern front at Bocaue. While there, they observed empty trucks departing Manila for Bataan. The battalion organized the shipment of 12,000 US gallons (45,000 L) of aviation gasoline and six truckloads of canned food from Manila. Even with those additional supplies sent to Bataan, a significant amount of supplies were either destroyed or left behind, which led to immediate rationing, which reduced the fighting ability of those on Bataan later on. With the bridges having been successfully defended by other units (including the 192nd), Company C became the last unit to cross the bridges before they were demolished to slow down the Japanese advance.

Moving northward on the first days of 1942, the 194th took up position east of San Fernando and south of town on the banks of the Pampanga River. The rest of the Provisional Tank Group covered the withdrawal of the remaining American-Filipino forces into Bataan. While in defensive positions, the first tank-on-tank combat occurred for the 194th, when five Japanese Type 89A tanks approached; the Japanese unit, having not conducted reconnaissance prior to their movement, was destroyed by the 194th in an open field. With the rest of the forces passing through the town, the tankers destroyed the bridge over the San Fernando River and withdrew to Guagua.

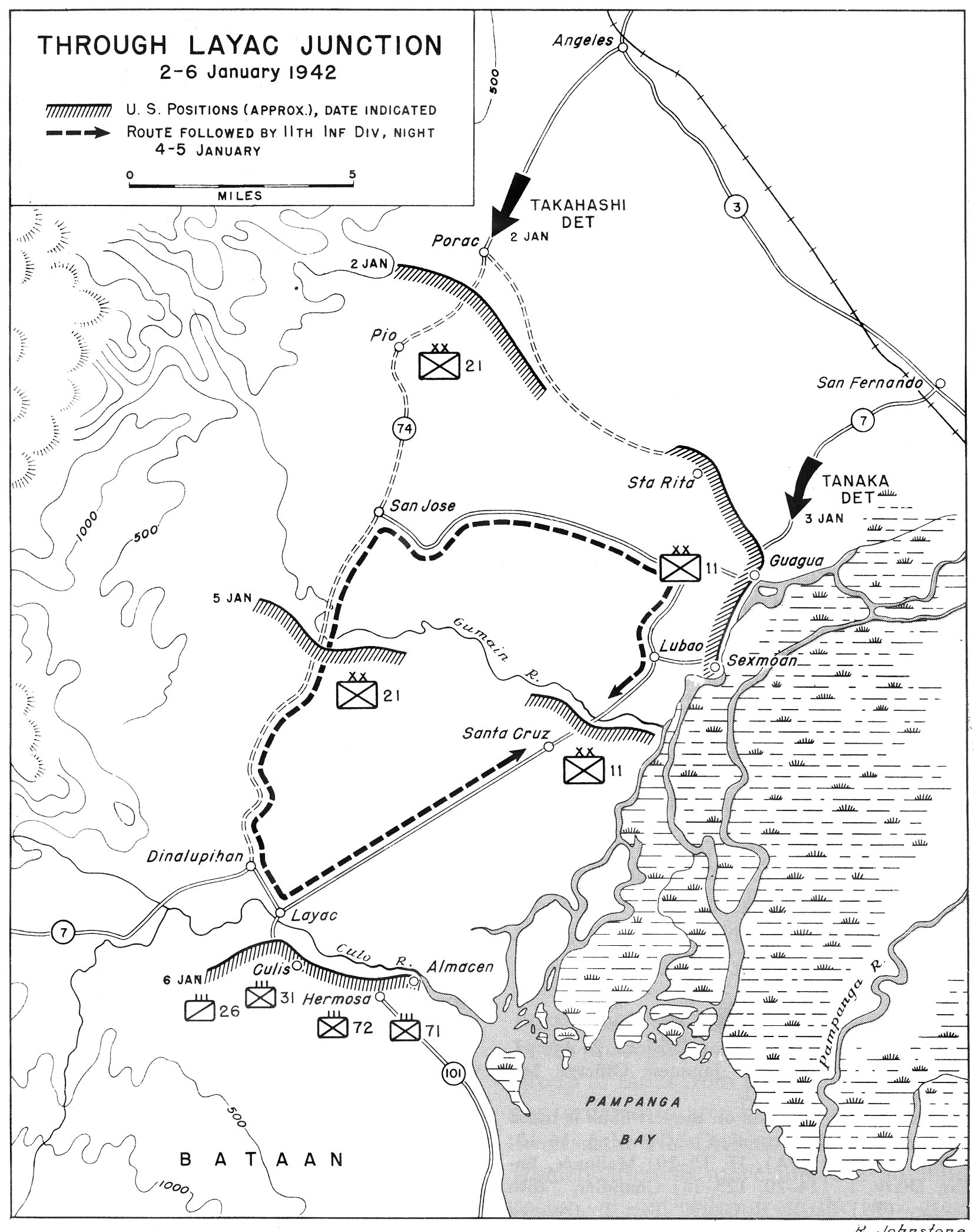
Defense of the Layac Junction approach to Bataan 2–6 January 1942.

Ten days after the American-Filipino forces began withdrawing, the 1st Provisional Tank Group conducted their final delaying actions, while the rest of the force prepared the defenses in Bataan, giving those troops three additional days. The first unit to conduct a delaying action was Company C, as it serving as an advance force of the mainline, north of Guagua. There they held for three and a half hours. Guagua was not held for long, less than two days, and Company C covered the retreat of the remainder of the battalion. While Company C was covering the flank of the forces retreating south from Guagua, a large enemy force of 500 to 800 Japanese soldiers approached behind three Philippine Constabulary officers waving a white flag; the covering force, consisting of two tanks and two half-tracks, opened fire upon the constabulary officers and the enemy behind them, killing them in the open.

Following some additional combat which led to significant Japanese losses in the Tanaka Detachment, Company C and the rest of the 1st Provisional Tank Group joined the 26th Cavalry, and the Philippines' 11th and 21st Divisions, to form a defense along the Gumain River. Without contact with Japanese forces, the defense line along the Gumain River was abandoned, and new defenses which involved the entirety of the 1st Provisional Tank Group were formed at Layac Junction. That was the final defensive line before Bataan; which was worked on and completed on the morning of 6 January 1942. Following combat on 6 January, which included the action which resulted in the awarding of the Medal of Honor to Sergeant Jose Calugas, the 1st Provisional Tank Group began to withdraw into Bataan ahead of the rest of the units assigned to the defenses at Layac Junction. They were the last U.S. unit to enter the Bataan Peninsula. Upon withdrawing behind the defensive lines to an area south of Pilar, the soldiers of the 1st Provisional Tank Group were finally able to rest, eating from their own kitchens for the first time since the beginning of combat operations, albeit at half rations.

==== Bataan ====
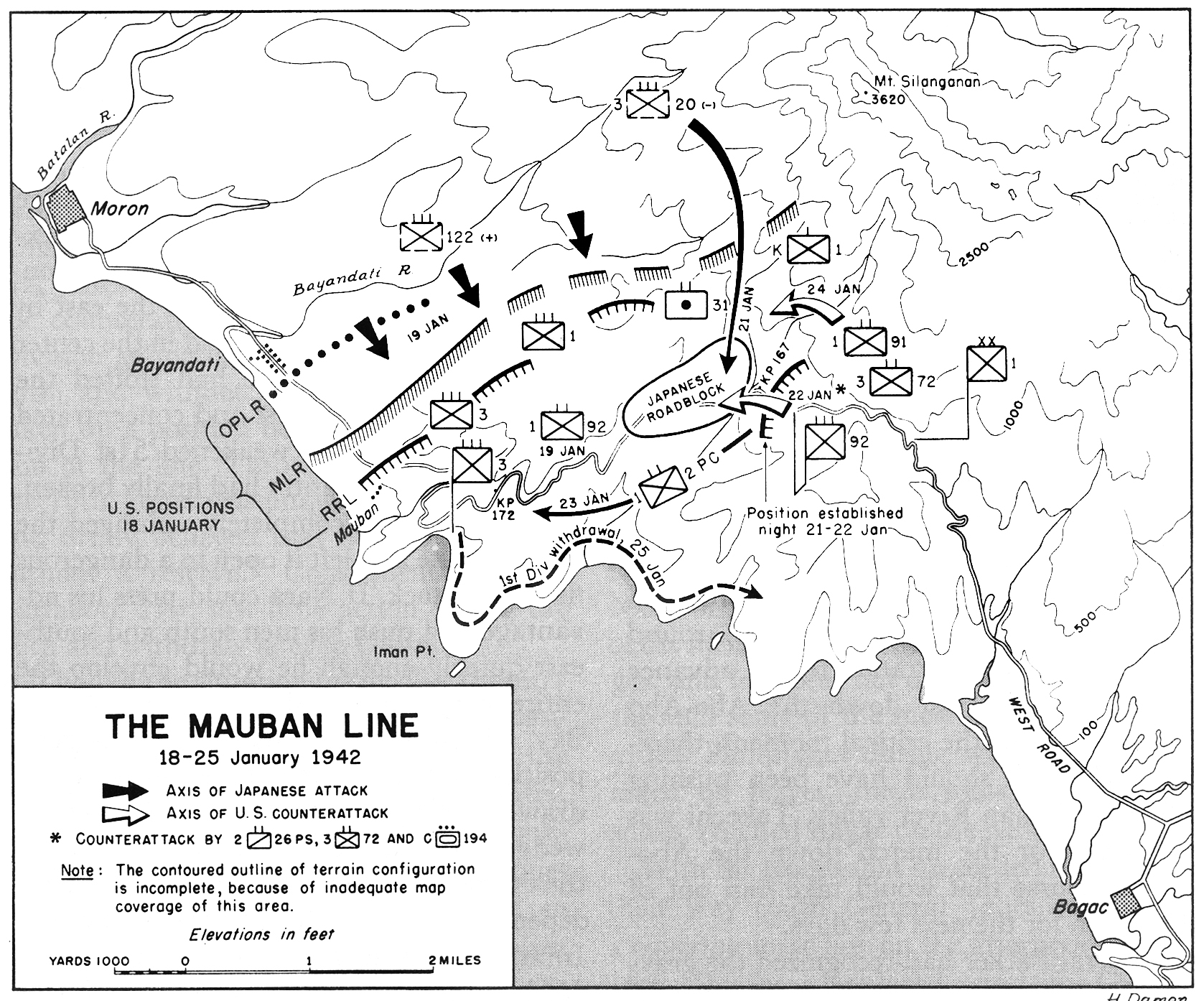
The Mauban Line at Bataan, Philippines, showing the U.S. positions 18–25 January 1942

On 10 January 1942, the 194th was called on to support the 57th Infantry Regiment near Abacay. On 23 January, Company C was called upon by Major General Jonathan M. Wainwright (later promoted to general), commander of I Philippine Corps (the renamed North Luzon Force), to fight a battalion of Japanese infantry to the west, near Mount Silanganan. Two tanks were damaged by anti-tank mines during the initial attack. Yet after that setback, with the support of elements of the 26th Cavalry, and a battalion of the Philippines' 72nd Infantry Regiment, the forces were able to reverse the gains of the Japanese. In late January, it was decided that the defensive line would be withdrawn down to Bogac and through to Orion. The 194th covered some of the last units to withdraw, which included the 31st and 45th Infantry Regiments; By 26 January, the 194th was the last to withdraw, breaking from contact while being attacked by artillery and mortar fire. While withdrawing, additional pressure was placed on the 194th, as air attacks harassed the unit along the way.

Major combat on Bataan came to a halt as Japanese force withdrew northward in February, maintaining a line of control at Balanga, and the Japanese 14th Army awaited reinforcements. By March 1942, rations were reduced from the meager half rations to quarter rations; this was accompanied by soldiers getting sick from dengue fever, malaria and other diseases. Company C was assigned to defending the coast along the eastern half of Bataan.

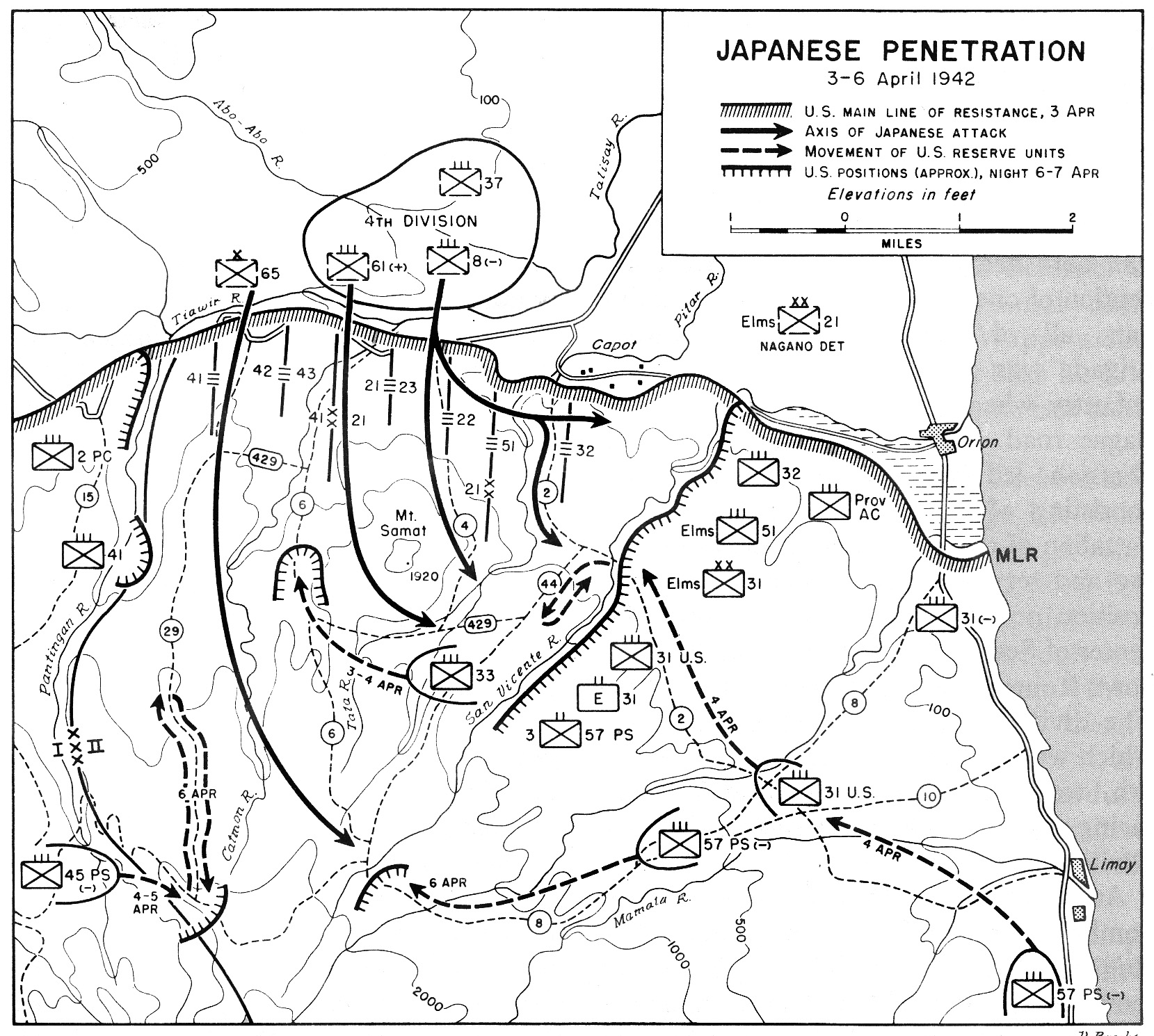
Japanese penetration of the U.S. Army lines at Mount Samat, Bataan, Philippines, 3–6 April 1942

During the final Japanese attack on the defending American and Filipino forces on Bataan, Company A of the 194th was assigned to coastal defense, firing upon Japanese barges and keeping them from coming ashore. On 4 April, Company C of the 194th, along with the 45th Infantry Regiment, were assigned to attack northward along Trail 29; commencing the attack on 7 April, they advanced northward, surprising a Japanese defensive position. In advancing, they had lost contact with friendly forces to their east and west; receiving new orders, and being informed of rapid Japanese advances, they were ordered southeast towards the junction of Trails 6 & 8 in hopes of establishing a new defensive position. Reversing their advance towards their new objective, with Company C leading the movement, the fire of Japanese anti-tank guns revealed that they had been flanked to the south by Japanese forces of the 65th Brigade. To the rear of their new movement and to the north, on Trail 29, Company C came into contact with elements of the Japanese 7th Tank Regiment which were attempting to advance southward along the trail, the ensuing combat lead to the destruction of two Japanese Type 89A tanks.

By 8 April, Company C was ordered to regroup to the south with the rest of the Provisional Tank Group, who were involved in attempting to provide defense against the Japanese attack along Trail 10. That evening all of the tank battalions were pulled off the line, and on the morning of 9 April, with the Company C tanks finally joining the rest of the group, received orders to destroy their equipment. By the time of surrender, Company C had lost 10 of its tanks, and had six soldiers killed in action.

==== Surrender and occupation ====
Following the surrender of the forces on Bataan by Major General Edward P. King, officers of the tank units were questioned by the Japanese; during the questioning, the officers learned that the tanks had kept away an invasion across Manila Bay, and that the American tanks were feared by the Japanese. When the Japanese finally arrived on 10 April, they began to loot the soldiers of anything of value. Following the looting, the Japanese began to force march them northward towards San Fernando, in what became known as the Bataan Death March. Some of the soldiers chose not to comply with orders and surrender, instead becoming guerrillas, resisting the Japanese occupation; one was Technician Fifth Grade Eugene Zingheim of Company C, a radio operator, who would later be executed after being caught by the Japanese due to malaria in 1943. Over time, the soldiers of Company C were spread across the areas occupied by Japan at various POW camps. Six were awarded the Silver Star, some posthumously, and each soldier of the company was awarded a Bronze Star Medal and a Purple Heart. In mid-September 1945, after the Surrender of Japan, the surviving members of the 194th Tank Battalion embarked for the United States at Yokohama.

=== Post World War II ===
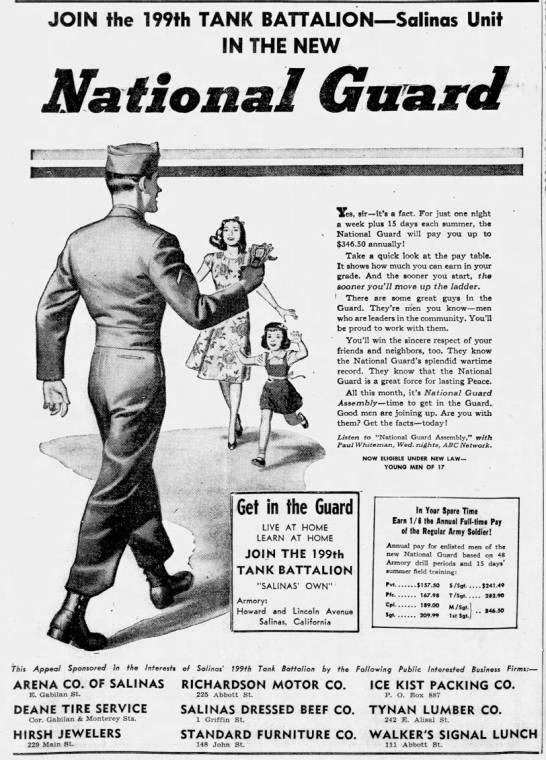
1947 newspaper recruiting advertisement for the 199th Tank Battalion

After World War II, the 194th Tank Battalion was inactivated in April 1946, then redesignated as the 199th Tank Battalion in June of that same year; it was federally recognized in 1947, with a leadership team made up of survivors of the 1941–1942 Philippines campaign. Two years later in 1949, the unit was reorganized and redesignated as the 149th Heavy Tank Battalion, as an element of the 49th Infantry Division. Then upon being consolidated with the 170th Antiaircraft Artillery Battalion, the unit was elevated to a parent regiment within the Combat Arms Regimental System (CARS) in 1959. (Note: Initially in CARS the regiment consisted of a medium tank battalion, and a reconnaissance squadron. The tank battalion was based at Salinas, while the reconnaissance squadron was based at Sacramento.) In 1960, annual training for the regiment was held at Camp Irwin. By 1962, M48 Patton tanks were being used during annual training at Camp Roberts. (Note: Regiment's 1st Medium Tank Battalion, had Company A at Monterey, Company B at Watsonville, Company C at Hollister, and Company D at Santa Cruz.) In 1963, the regiment was reorganized again and expanded to consist of 1st, 3rd, and 4th battalions, with 2nd squadron becoming the 170th Cavalry Regiment. (Note: 1st Battalion was assigned to the 3rd Brigade, 3rd Battalion to the 1st Brigade, and 4th to the 49th Infantry Brigade, all under the 49th Infantry Division.)

During a weekend drill in 1965, the unit was called up to man roadblocks created in response to the Watts Riots; while there the tankers were fired upon. The regiment's 1st, 3rd, and 4th battalions were called up during the Watts Riots, with the regimental headquarters operating out of the 118th Street School. In 1968, the regiment was reorganized to consist only of its 1st Battalion; the regiment was detached from the 49th, and was no longer associated with a division. (Note: During the 1960s Defense Secretary Robert McNamara proposed and carried out a number of reorganizations of the Army Reserve and National Guard. By the end of the decade, due to one of those reorganizations, 49th Infantry Division was reorganized and downsized to become the 49th Infantry Brigade.) Later, in 1974, the regiment became an element of the 40th Infantry Division.

During the 1970s and 1980s the regiment continued to conduct its regular cycle of monthly weekend drills and annual training; one of these sent the regiment's lone battalion to Camp Ripley, Minnesota, for winter training in 1982. (Note: One of the locations which was available to the regiment for weekend drills was a park in Santa Cruz.) During the 1980s, the regiment was authorized a strength of 501 Soldiers. In 1989, the regiment was withdrawn from CARS and reorganized in the United States Army Regimental System; (Note: The regiment continued to consist of only its 1st Battalion.) by that same year the regiment was equipped with M60A3 Patton. In response to the 1992 Los Angeles riots, Operation Garden Plot was initiated, leading to the regiment returning to riot control duties in Los Angeles. During the 1990s, the regiment was part of the 3rd Brigade of the 40th Infantry Division. In 1996, the regiment's headquarters moved to the Presidio of Monterey.

Due to the force reduction in other units, as part of a post-Cold War peace dividend which included Base Realignment and Closure, in 1997 the regiment saw an increase in its size; (Note: By 1997, the regiment consisted of 1st Battalion, with companies in Monterey, Camp Roberts, Santa Cruz, and Madera.) this increase in size coincided with the regiment transitioning from the M60A3 to the M1IP Abrams. In May 1998, a training center was established at Watsonville, and named after Chief Warrant Officer Ero "Ben" Saccone, who was the First Sergeant of Company C, 194th Tank Battalion in 1941; within the training center was the 40th Tank Company's guidon, which dated back to June 1924 (and survived combat overseas, and being hidden by unit members while they were POW). A year later, the regiment's headquarters was moved once again to Seaside.

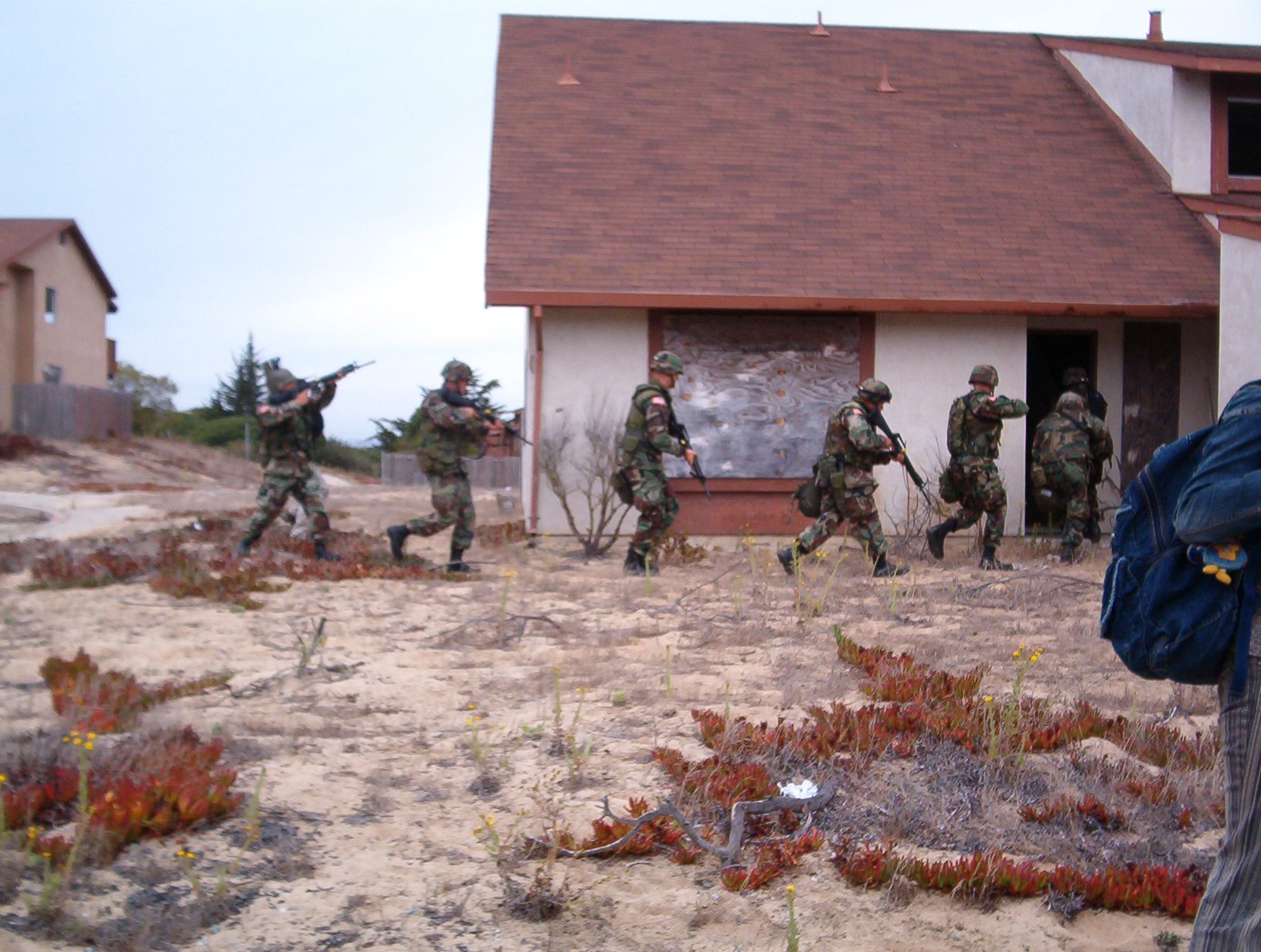
Soldiers of the 149th training at the former Fort Ord in 2004 before deployment to the Balkans

The battalion was activated for Operation Noble Eagle I & II, providing security at potential targets and airports in the United States, in 2003. Then in 2005, it was activated to conduct NATO peacekeeping duties as part of the Kosovo Force. Following redesignation of the regiment from armor to armored in 2005, it was consolidated with another unit, which retained the name 340th Brigade Support Battalion in 2007, a part of the 65th Fires Brigade. Prior to the regiment being consolidated into another unit, almost 90% of the soldiers of the regiment had already seen combat in the war on terror, as strained resources led to more national guardsmen serving in overseas conflicts.

== Awards ==
The regiment, and its subordinate units are authorized the following awards and streamers:
Presidential Unit Citations

- DEFENSE OF THE PHILIPPINES
- LUZON 1941–1942
- BATAAN PENINSULA

Philippine Presidential Unit Citation

- 7 December 1941 to 10 May 1942

Campaign streamers:

- World War I streamer without inscription
- Philippine Islands
- Aleutian Islands (Company C, 1st Battalion)

== Lineage ==
The lineage of the unit is as follows:

- Organized 5 August 1895 in the California National Guard at Salinas as Troop C, Cavalry.
- Redesignated 1 May 1911 as Troop C, 1st Squadron of Cavalry.
- Mustered into Federal service 26 June 1916 at Sacramento; mustered out of Federal service 17 November 1916 at Los Angeles.
- Drafted into Federal service 5 November 1917.
- Reorganized and redesignated 3 October 1917 as Company B, 145th Machine Gun Battalion, an element of the 40th Division.
- Demobilized 20 May 1919 at the Presidio of San Francisco, California.
- Reorganized and Federally recognized 18 June 1924 in the California National Guard at Salinas as the 40th Tank Company and assigned to the 40th Division.
- Reorganized and redesignated 1 September 1940 as Company C, 194th Tank Battalion, and relieved from assignment to the 40th Division.
- Inducted into Federal service 10 February 1941 at Salinas.
- Surrendered 9 April 1942 to the Japanese 14th Army in the Philippine Islands.
- Inactivated 2 April 1946 in the Philippine Islands.
- Expanded and redesignated 21 June 1946 as the 199th Tank Battalion.
- Reorganized and Federally recognized 27 May 1947 with headquarters at Salinas.
- Reorganized and redesignated 1 February 1949 as the 149th Heavy Tank Battalion and assigned to the 49th Infantry Division.
- Reorganized and redesignated 1 September 1950 as the 149th Tank Battalion.
- Consolidated 1 May 1959 with the 170th Antiaircraft Artillery Battalion and consolidated unit reorganized and redesignated as the 149th Armor, a parent regiment under the Combat Arms Regimental System, to consist of the 1st Medium Tank Battalion and the 2d Reconnaissance Squadron, elements of the 49th Infantry Division.
- Reorganized 1 March 1963 to consist of the 1st and 3d Battalions, elements of the 49th Infantry Division, and the 4th Medium Tank Battalion.
- Reorganized 1 April 1964 to consist of the 1st and 3d Battalions, elements of the 49th Infantry Division, and the 4th Battalion.
- Reorganized 29 January 1968 to consist of the 1st Battalion.
- Reorganized 13 January 1974 to consist of the 1st Battalion, an element of the 40th Infantry Division.
- Withdrawn 19 January 1988 from the Combat Arms Regimental System and reorganized under the United States Army Regimental System.
- 1st Battalion ordered into active Federal service 1 May 1992 at home stations; released from active Federal service 9 May 1992 and reverted to state control.
- Location of headquarters changed 1 June 1996 to the Presidio of Monterey; on 1 October 1999 to Seaside, California.
- Ordered into active Federal service 14 August 2002 at home stations; released from active Federal service 2 September 2003 and reverted to state control.
- Redesignated 1 October 2005 as the 149th Armored Regiment.
- Consolidated 1 September 2007 with the 340th Support Battalion and consolidated unit designated as the 340th Support Battalion.

== Legacy ==
During the Bataan Death March, Salinas had the unfortunate distinction of having the highest number of soldiers per capita in the march, of any city in the United States. Of the 105 soldiers who left Salinas, who made up a large part of the 114 men who were part of Company C, 46 or 47 survived the war. In October 2011, Sergeant Roy Diaz was reported to be the last surviving Salinas member of Company C; he was the subject of an Emmy Award winning story produced by KTEH, and in February 2012, it was proposed that an access road off Airport Boulevard in Salinas, leading to Salinas Municipal Airport, be named for Diaz. In fact, Diaz was not the lone survivor, but was one of three. By June 2013 all had died, with the last survivor of Company C being Manny Nevarez; he had been a private, and spent time on Mindanao and in Japan as a POW.

=== Descendant units ===
- 115th Regional Support Group
- 340th Support Battalion
- 670th Military Police Company, 185th Military Police Battalion, 49th Military Police Brigade

=== Memorials ===
In 2006, a memorial was erected at the Boronda History Center to commemorate the soldiers of Company C 194th Tank Battalion. This follows a memorial located at Camp San Luis Obispo depicting the actions of Morello's tank on 26 December 1941. In Salinas, a triangular park was named Bataan Memorial Park.

=== Popular media ===
In July 1918, some of the soldiers that were part of Troop C, were already in France and participated in the Second Battle of the Marne; one of these soldiers (Martin Hopps) died during the battle, becoming the first soldier from Salinas to die during World War I; he is mentioned in John Steinbeck's book East of Eden.

Tanks of the 40th Tank Company were used during the filming of The Big House.

In the film Bataan, Desi Arnaz depicts a California National Guardsman in a multi-racial unit fighting a delaying action. (Note: In the movie Arnaz depicts a character Private Felix Ramirez of the California National Guard, and says so in the film. He also says he is with the 192nd Tank Battalion; however the 192nd was made up of units from Wisconsin, Illinois, Ohio, and Kentucky. In late 1941, and early 1942, there were only three California National Guard units that were deployed outside of the continental United States; these were the 250th Coastal Artillery Regiment who were deployed to Alaska, the 251st Coastal Artillery Regiment who were deployed to Hawaii, and Company C of the 194th Tank Battalion who were deployed to the Philippines.)

== See also ==
- 194th Armor Regiment
