= Refresher training (military) =

Type of reservist military training

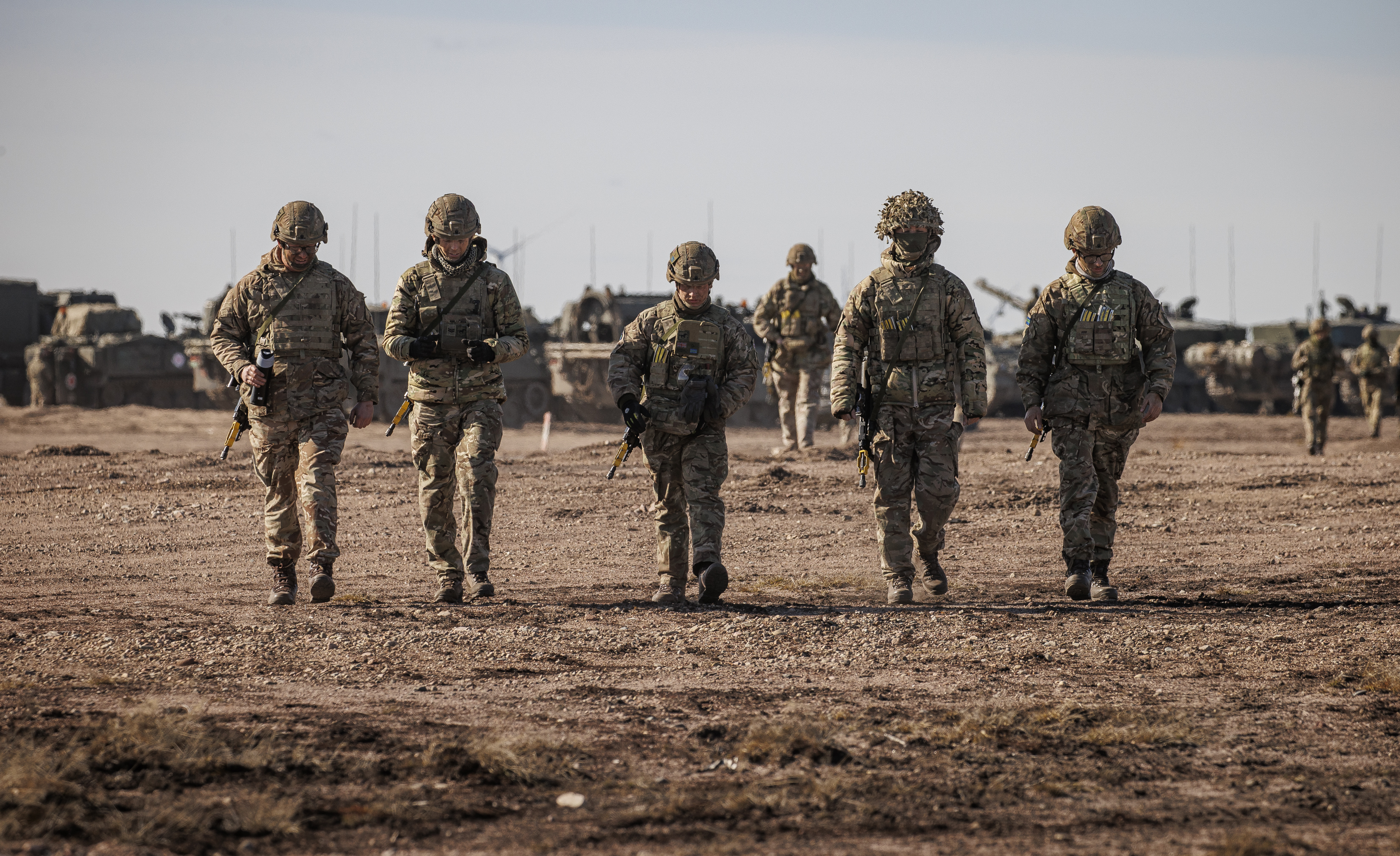
Challenger 2 crew members walk across the training area to a refresher lesson during the Arrow 22 exercise in Niinisalo, Finland

Refresher training is a form of updating military knowledge of the reservist troops. Troops who completed the conscription service can be called for refresher training for some number of days.

== Refresher training in the Finnish Defence Forces ==
In the Finnish Defence Forces (FDF), Officers and NCOs can be ordered to refresher training for 100 days in addition to their original military service and the rank and file (privates and other lower ranks) for 75 or 40 days. The amount of refresher training that a reservist is called to depends on the importance of the reservists assignment, deployment, the amount of special training (i.e. training that requires constant upkeep of skills) and willingness. The aim is to train the most important wartime units at intervals of about 5 years. The average duration of the exercises is approximately 5 days and nights. Many never get called for refresher training, some get called frequently and some even apply for voluntary additional training. The obligation for refresher training ends at the age of 60 for Officers and NCOs and 50 for the lower ranks.

== Refresher training in the Swedish Defence Forces ==
As part of the changes in the post-Cold War reorganization of the Swedish Armed Forces from an invasion defence force to a targeted mission force, refresher training sessions were not held starting in the late 1990s. Refresher training was reintroduced by the Swedish government on December 11, 2014.

== United States Armed Forces ==
Refresher training periods in the reserve components of the United States Armed Forces were until the war on terror typified by the recruiting slogan "one weekend a month, two weeks a year". Battle Assembly refers to monthly weekend drills, while annual training exercises last anywhere between 14 and 30 consecutive days per year.
