= Drill (disambiguation) =

A drill is a tool or machine for cutting holes in a material.

Drill may also refer to:

== Animals ==
- Drill (animal), a type of African primate
- Oyster drill, a type of snail

== Military ==
- Military exercise
- Foot drill, the movements performed on a military parade
- Former name of the United States Army Reserve's Battle Assembly
- Exhibition drill, a form of complex military drill
- Drill commands
- When applied as an adjective, a practice version of something, e.g., drill round

== Music ==
- Drill music, a subgenre of trap music

=== Performers ===
- Drill (American band), an alternative rock band
- Drill (British band), an industrial rock band from England
- The Drill (British band), a punk rock band from England
- The Drill (band), an electro house band

=== Recordings ===
- Drill (album), a 1996 album by the band of the same name
- Drill (EP), a 1992 EP by Radiohead
- The Drill (album), a 1991 album by Wire
- Drill, a 1996 album by Noise Unit
- "Drill", a 2021 song by G Herbo from the album 25

== Safety exercises ==
- Fire drill
- Tornado drill
- Lockdown drill

== Technology ==
- Bow drill, a fire-making tool
- Drill (agriculture), an agricultural tool
- Drill (fabric), a type of cotton fabric
- Data drilling, navigation through levels of a hierarchy in data analysis
- Apache Drill, a distributed query engine

== Other uses ==
- Drill, Virginia, a community in the United States
- Dan Drill, University of Minnesota student charged with a violent rape
- Lew Drill (1877–1969), American baseball player, baseball manager, and lawyer

== See also ==
- Drilling (disambiguation)
- DRIL (disambiguation)
- Bore (disambiguation)
