= Drilling (disambiguation) =

Drilling is the cutting of a hole into a solid.

Drilling may also refer to:

- Boring (earth), cutting a hole into the earth
- Drilling (firearm), a combination gun

== See also ==
- Data drilling
- Drill (disambiguation)
- Perforation (disambiguation)
- Boring (disambiguation)
