= Ennui (disambiguation) =

Ennui is another word for boredom.

Ennui may also refer to:

== Literature ==
- Ennui (novel), an 1809 book by Maria Edgeworth
- "Ennui" (sonnet), an early poem by Sylvia Plath, unpublished before 2006

== Music ==
- "Ennui", a song by Lou Reed
- "Ennui" or "Boredom", a song by Modest Mussorgsky in his Sunless song cycle
- "Ennui", a song by Aldous Harding from the album Warm Chris
- "Ennui", a song by VersaEmerge from Cities Built on Sand

== Art ==
- "Ennui", a painting by Walter Sickert

== Film and television ==
- Ennui, a character from The Ridonculous Race
- Ennui, a character from Inside Out 2
- Ennui, a fictional town from The French Dispatch

== See also ==
- Boredom (disambiguation)
