= Bohr (disambiguation) =

Bohr most often refers to:

- Niels Bohr (1885–1962), Danish atomic physicist, Nobel Prize in physics 1922

Bohr may also refer to:

== People ==
- Aage Bohr (1922–2009), Danish nuclear physicist, Nobel Prize in physics 1975, son of Niels Bohr
- Christian Bohr (1855–1911), Danish physician and physiologist, father of Harald and of Niels Bohr
- Harald Bohr (1887–1951), Danish Olympic silver medalist football player and mathematician; brother of Niels Bohr
- Margrethe Bohr (1890–1984), wife, editor, and transcriber for Danish physicist Niels Bohr

== Astronomy ==
- 3948 Bohr, an asteroid named after Niels Bohr
- Bohr (crater), a lunar crater
- Vallis Bohr, a lunar valley

== Places ==
- Niels Bohr Institute, University of Copenhagen, Denmark
- Bohr, Bushehr, a village in Bushehr Province, Iran
- Bohr-e Bagh, a village in Bushehr Province, Iran
- Bohr-e Hajj Nowshad, a village in Bushehr Province, Iran

== Science ==
- Bohr effect, a property of hemoglobin discovered by Christian Bohr
- Bohr magneton, a unit of magnetic moment proposed by Niels Bohr
- Bohr model, an atomic theory due to Niels Bohr
- Bohr radius, a radius of atomic orbit in Bohr model
- Bohrium, a chemical element number 107 named after Niels Bohr

== Other uses ==
- Bohr bug, a type of software bug
- Bohr compactification, a mathematical concept due to Harald Bohr
