= Battle Assembly =

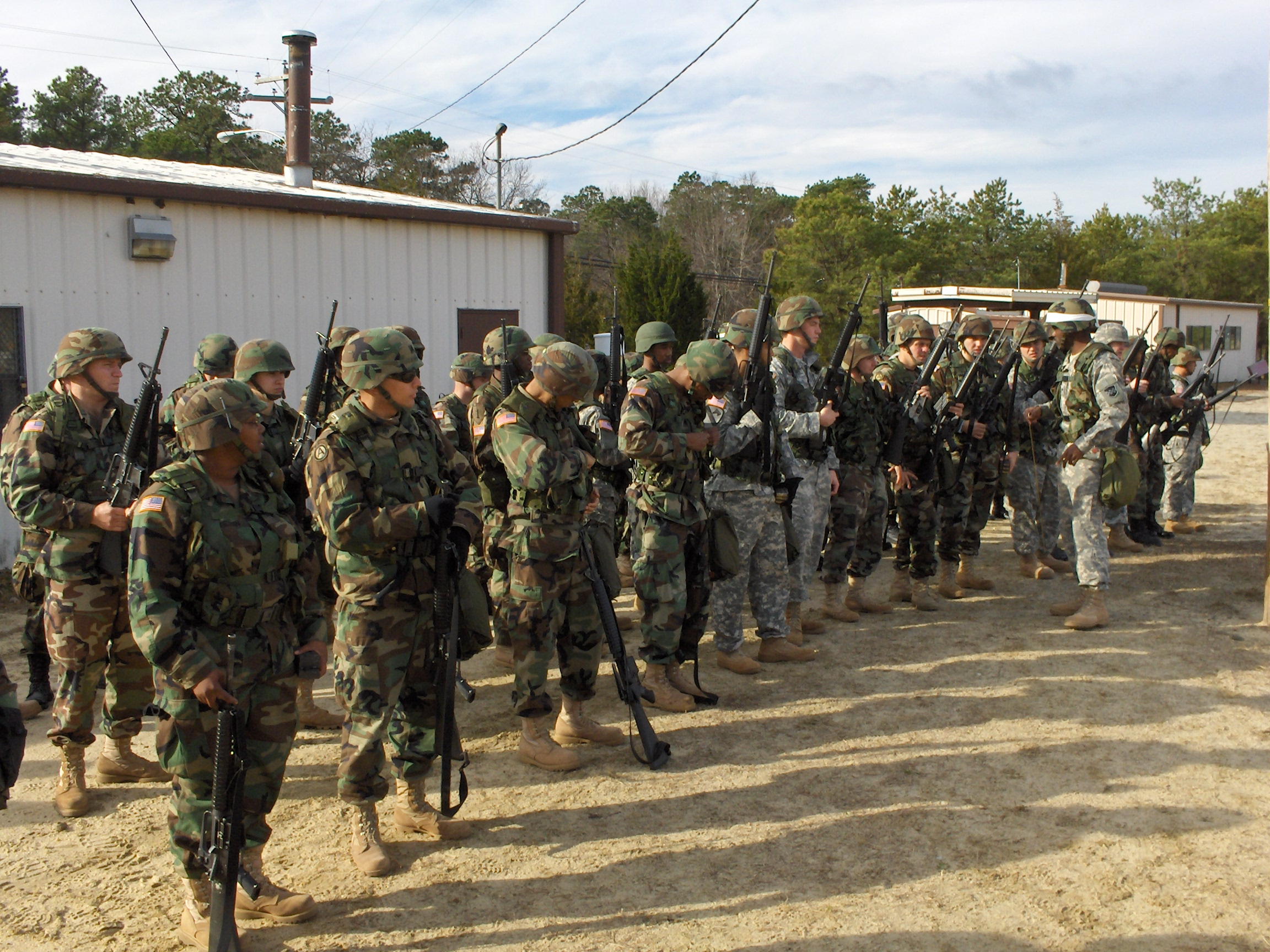
Soldiers get ready to go to the Weapons Qualification Range at Fort Dix, New Jersey

Battle Assembly is the term used by the United States Army Reserve to describe monthly training, where soldiers practice and perfect their military skills and maintain individual and unit readiness in the event of mobilization and deployment. These training activities were formerly referred to simply as "drill" or "weekend drill", but according to former Chief of the Army Reserve, Lieutenant General James R. Helmly, the term was changed in 2005 to emphasize the need for Army Reserve soldiers' training to focus on continued preparation for fighting the Global War on Terrorism.

== History ==
During the Korean War (1950–1953), the United States Congress made significant changes to the structure and role of the Army Reserves. These changes transformed the former Organized Reserve Corps into the United States Army Reserve, dividing it into a Ready Reserve, Standby Reserve, and Retired Reserve. Members of the Ready Reserve were authorized 24 inactive duty training sessions per year with their respective reserve unit. This translated into two duty days per month for twelve months and the commencement of regular "monthly drills" for reservists.

== Reserve service ==
Currently US Army Reserve soldiers sign an initial eight-year service contract upon entry into the military. However, in past eras, most enlistment contracts were for different terms which have been adjusted for different terms and lengths. Occasionally, the enlistment contract specifies that some of the service contract be served in the Regular Army, or "active component" (two, three, or four years), with the rest of the service to be served in the reserve component; alternately, some enlistees elect to sign a contract specifying that his or her entire enlistment obligation be served in the reserve component only. In such case, the soldier or enlistee enters directly into the Army Reserve. Those soldiers who serve a period of years in the active component and choose not to re-enlist in the active component are sometimes transferred afterwards to the reserve component to complete their initial service obligation. After the expiration of the initial service contract, soldiers who elect to continue their service may sign subsequent contracts consecutively until they are formally discharged from the military. The soldiers that attend battle assembly (weekends) are compensated at a higher rate than active duty components. Currently, a four-hour block of service is compensated at an active duty single day of compensation. Thus, a reserve component soldier who performs two 8-hour days in a month will receive the equivalent of an active soldier compensation of four days. However, during the annual training, the compensation will be at the rate afforded to active duty pay. Hence, the heightened pay received by active reserve will only occur during the 24 8-hour days for battle assembly during the normal weekend battle assemblies.

While in the Army Reserve, soldiers may belong to the active Army Reserve, or the Individual Ready Reserve. The key difference is that active Army Reserve soldiers typically attend Battle Assembly one weekend a month, twelve months a year, and also attend a statutory two-week period of active duty every year, referred to as Annual Training. Conversely, members of the Individual Ready Reserve are not required to attend Battle Assembly or Annual Training, but remain committed to military service obligations and may be recalled to active duty as directed by the President or U.S. Congress. Although National Guard troops may be trained by the US Army and attend the same basic training and advanced individual training as US Army Reserve troops, the ultimate authority for the National Guard troops are under the control and authority of the individual states in which they serve. Thus, subsequently they may be called for individual state emergencies as authorized by their respective state governors.

The reserves used to use a recruiting slogan, "One weekend a month and two weeks a year", but has since dropped that slogan due to the Iraq War, where commitments are typically much longer than that time.

== Typical duties ==
Once per month, soldiers report to their unit in uniform, usually very early on a Saturday morning but sometimes on a Friday morning or evening. Their duties typically continue until Sunday evening, but may end earlier at the direction of the unit's commanding officer. During battle assembly, the unit may move to a field training environment to conduct field training; otherwise, the unit's personnel will remain at the unit's home facility to conduct operations there, usually referred to as training in garrison. Most battle assemblies are conducted in garrison, unless the unit is a combat arms unit such as infantry and as a result more likely to spend most battle assemblies in the field. During any given battle assembly, soldiers may:

- Go to a weapons range to qualify with their individual weapon or a crew served weapon.
- Be evaluated taking an Army Fitness Test (AFT), or participate in group physical training.
- Receive military training and practice common soldier skills, such as first aid.
- Practice specific vocational tasks related to their Military Occupational Specialty (MOS).
- Meet annual training requirements concerning OPSEC, EEO, and similar military programs.
- Maintain their individual military equipment, such as their chemical protective mask.
- Maintain their unit's organizational equipment, such as military vehicles and generators.
- Conduct a movement exercise, such as military vehicle convoy operations.
- Undergo a Soldier Readiness Program (SRP) event, especially if preparing to deploy.
- Receive health and dental screenings including preventative immunizations.

Once per year, most units will also have a "Family Day," where family members can attend and see firsthand what the unit and the soldier does. The family members also usually receive briefings on benefits and services available to reserve soldiers and their families while attending a unit social event, which helps strengthen family ties to the unit and encourages family members to participate in the unit's Family Readiness Group.

== See also ==
- United States Army Reserve
- Refresher training
- Reserve Component of the United States Military
