= Chaheh =

Village in Bushehr province, Iran

Chaheh Persian: چاهه
- Village
- Location within Iran
- Coordinates: 27°47′24″N 52°23′12″E
- Country: Iran
- Province: Bushehr
- County: Jam
- District: Central
- Rural District: Jam

Population (2016)
  - Total: 1,664
- Time zone: UTC+3:30 (IRST)

Chaheh (Persian: چاهه) (Note: Also romanized as Chāheh; also known as Chāhā and Chāhheh) is a village in Jam Rural District of the Central District in Jam County, Bushehr province, Iran.

== Demographics ==
=== Population ===
At the time of the 2006 National Census, the village's population was 1,879 in 225 households. The following census in 2011 counted 1,237 people in 325 households. The 2016 census measured the population of the village as 1,664 people in 438 households.
