= Qaidi, Iran =

Village in Bushehr province, Iran

Qaidi Persian: قايدي
- Village
- Location within Iran
- Coordinates: 27°51′23″N 52°17′24″E
- Country: Iran
- Province: Bushehr
- County: Jam
- District: Central
- Rural District: Jam

Population (2016)
  - Total: 975
- Time zone: UTC+3:30 (IRST)

Qaidi (Persian: قايدي) (Note: Also romanized as Qā‘edī, Qāīdī, and Qāyedī) is a village in Jam Rural District of the Central District in Jam County, Bushehr province, Iran.

== Demographics ==
=== Population ===
At the time of the 2006 National Census, the village's population was 604 in 128 households. The following census in 2011 counted 856 people in 213 households. The 2016 census measured the population of the village as 975 people in 284 households.
