= Boring (surname) =

Boring is a surname. Notable people with the surname include:

- Alice Middleton Boring (1883–1955), American biologist, zoologist, and herpetologist
- Edwin G. Boring (1886–1968), American experimental psychologist
- Floyd Boring (1915–2008), American Secret Service agent
- Mel Boring (Melvin Lyle Boring, born 1939), American children's author, father of Jeremy Boring Davies
- Wayne Boring (1905–1987), American comic book artist best known for his work on Superman in the 1940s and 1950s
- William A. Boring (1859–1937), American architect who co-designed the Immigration Station at Ellis Island in New York harbor
- William H. Boring (1841–1932), American soldier; settler and namesake of Boring, Oregon

== See also ==
- David Boring, a graphic novel
- Jeremy Davies (Jeremy Boring Davies, born 1969), American actor, son of Mel Boring
- Boring (disambiguation)
