= Boring =

Boring may refer to:

- Something that causes boredom

== Engineering and science ==
- Boring (earth), drilling a hole, tunnel, or well in the earth
  - Tunnel boring machine, a machine used in boring tunnels
- Boring (manufacturing), enlarging a hole that has already been drilled
- Drilling, a cutting process that uses a drill bit to cut a hole of circular cross-section
- Boring, a mechanism of bioerosion

== Places ==
- Boring, Maryland, U.S.
- Boring, Oregon, U.S.
  - Boring Lava Field
- Boring, Tennessee, U.S.

== Other uses ==
- Boring (surname)
- "Boring" (The Young Ones), an episode of The Young Ones
- "Boring", a song by Pink from Funhouse
- "Boring (It's Too Late)", a song by Medina from Forever
- The Boring Company

== See also ==
- Bore (disambiguation)
- Bored (disambiguation)
- Boredom (disambiguation)
- Boreing (disambiguation)
- Drilling (disambiguation)
- Earth-boring dung beetle, a family of beetles that excavate burrows in which to lay their eggs
- David Boring, a graphic novel
