= Boreing =

Boreing may refer to:

== People ==
- Jeremy Boreing (born 1979), American director
- Vincent Boreing (1839–1903), U.S. Representative from Kentucky

== Other ==
- Boreing, Kentucky, a community in the United States

== See also ==
- Boring (disambiguation)
