= Maidalen =

Coordinates: 54°15′S 36°31′W

Maidalen is a valley, 1.2 nautical miles (2.2 km) long in a north–south direction, extending from Maiviken to Lewis Pass on Thatcher Peninsula, South Georgia. This feature was originally considered to be a part of Bore Valley but has since been determined to be a separate valley. It was named Maidalen (May valley) by the UK Antarctic Place-Names Committee in 1990 following in the Norwegian form an association with Maiviken.
