= Boredom (disambiguation) =

Boredom, tedium, ennui, is an emotional or psychological state of mind.

Boredom may also refer to:

- Boredoms, a Japanese rock band
- Wolf W-11 Boredom Fighter, a 1979 biplane designed to resemble WWI fighters
- The Boredom of Haruhi Suzumiya, aka Boredom, a 2003 novel of the Suzumiya Haruhi light novel series
- "Скучай", aka "Boredom", an 1874 song by Modest Mussorgsky from the compositional work Sunless
- Boredom (La noia), aka The Empty Canvas, a 1960 novel by Alberto Moravia
- "Boredom", a 1969 song by Procol Harum from the album A Salty Dog
- "Boredom", a 1977 song by the Buzzcocks from the EP Spiral Scratch
- Boredom (Tyler, the Creator song), 2017
- "Dokolica", aka "Boredom", a 1982 song by Električni Orgazam
- Boredom room, employee banishment strategy of boring work
- Boredom (film), a 2012 Canadian satirical documentary film

== See also ==
- Bore (disambiguation)
- Bored (disambiguation)
- Boring (disambiguation)
- Ennui (disambiguation)
