= DRIL =

DRIL or dril may refer to:

- Distal Revascularization and Interval Ligation, a surgical method of treating vascular access steal syndrome
- Directorio Revolucionario Ibérico de Liberación (Spanish) or Directório Revolucionário Ibérico de Libertação (Portuguese), name of an armed organization formed by Spaniards and Portuguese opponents of the Iberian dictatorships
- Damodar Ropeways & Infra Ltd, a constructor of aerial lifts in India
- dril, a pseudonymous Twitter user @dril best known for his idiosyncratic style of absurdist humor and non sequiturs

== See also ==
- Drill (disambiguation)
