= 192nd Tank Battalion =

Military unit

The 192nd Tank Battalion of the United States Army was a federalized Army National Guard unit activated in November 1940. Deployed to the Philippines, the battalion was engaged in combat during the Japanese invasion and the US retreat to the Bataan Peninsula; being part of the force that surrendered to the Japanese there, it subsequently ceased to exist as an active unit.

== History ==
=== Activation and deployment ===
In 1941, the US Army Chief of Staff, General George C. Marshall, directed that the army's new M3 Stuart light tanks, then just rolling off the assembly lines, were to have the highest priority in reinforcing General MacArthur's command in the Pacific. The activated Army National Guard 194th and 192nd Tank Battalions were each equipped with 54 of the newly manufactured M3 Stuart light tanks, along with 23 half-tracks per battalion. The federalized California Army Guard 194th Tank Battalion deployed from San Francisco on 8 September 1941, arriving in the Philippines on 26 September. That deployment was followed by the 192nd Tank Battalion, which reached Manila in November. The 192nd Tank Battalion was composed of tank companies from:

- Janesville, Wisconsin (Company A, formerly 32nd Tank Company),
- Maywood, Illinois (Company B formerly 33rd Tank Company),
- Port Clinton, Ohio (Company C formerly 37th Tank Company) and
- Harrodsburg, Kentucky (Company D formerly 38th Tank Company).

On 21 November 1941 the 192nd and 194th Tank Battalions were combined to form the Provisional Tank Group under the command of Colonel James R. N. Weaver. With the subsequent commencement of hostilities, and Japanese landings along the coastlines in December, the Provisional Tank Group was ordered to counterattack the landing forces, and to cover the allied retreat towards the Bataan Peninsula.

=== America's first clash of armor ===
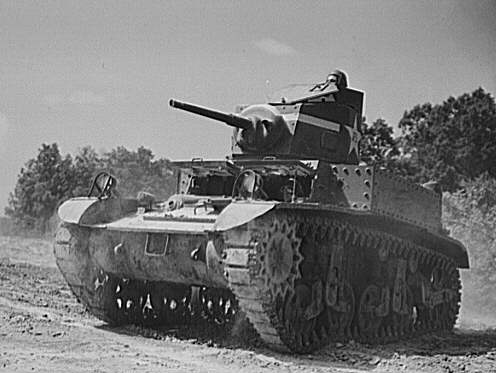
US Army M3 Stuart tank at Fort Knox Ky

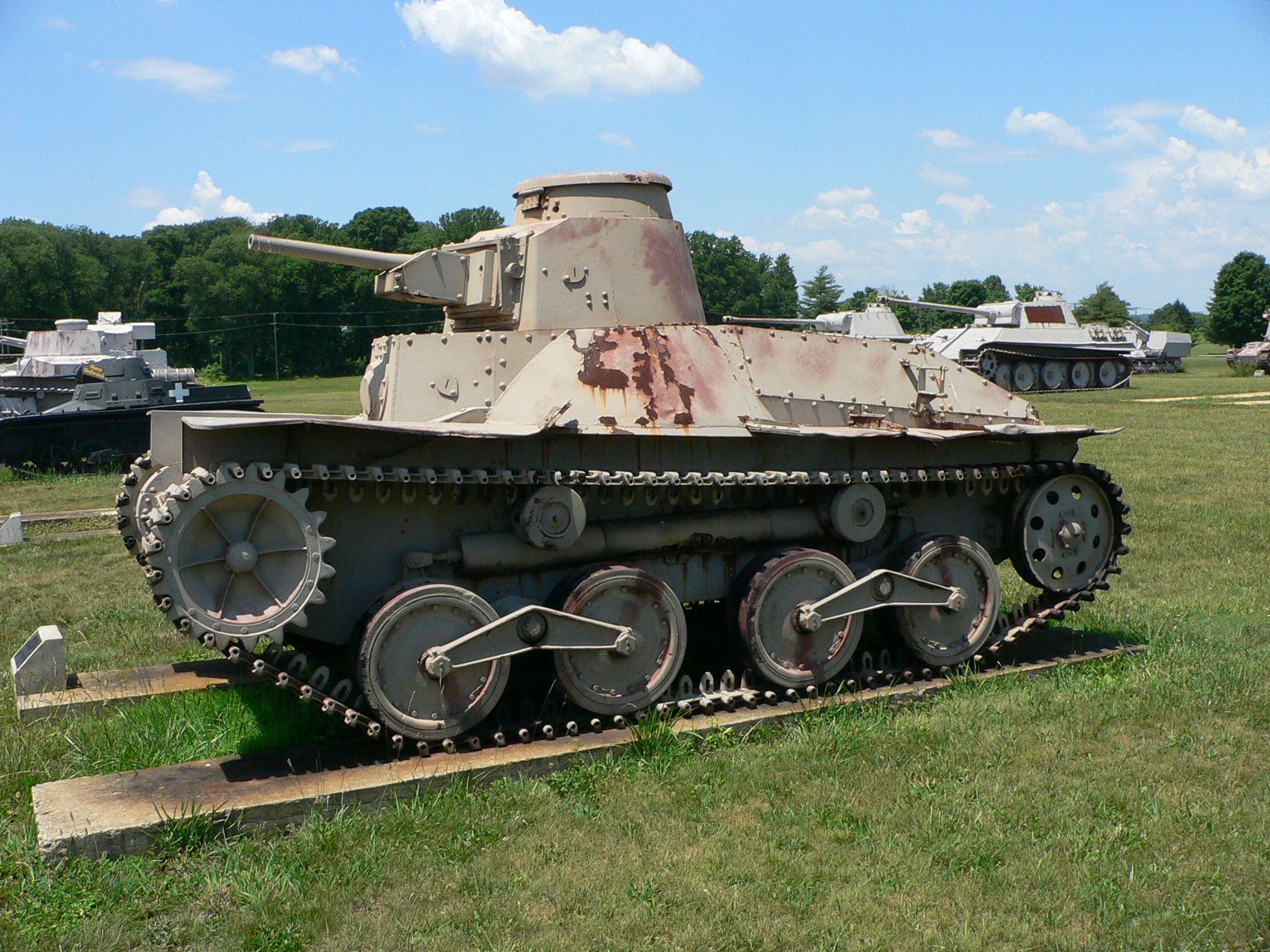
IJA type 95 tank

On 21 December 1941, the 192nd Tank Battalion, under the command of Major Theodore F. Wickord, was ordered to move north. Major Wickord sent B Company, commanded by Captain Donald Hanes, ahead, most likely as an advanced guard. During B Company's advance, they had planned to refuel their gasoline powered M3's at Gerona and then again at Bauang. However, upon reaching Gerona, no fuel was available, and word reached Captain Hanes that the enemy was fast approaching Bauang.

The US Army's last official US Horse Cavalry to see combat was the US 26th Cavalry (Horse) (Philippine Scouts) in 1942. The 26th Cavalry had just recently been under enemy aerial attack, and was operating in the area currently being traversed by B Company tanks. General Wainwright, commander of US/allied forces in the Philippines during its final period, received reports that the town of Damortis was fast being approached by mechanized elements of the Japanese Army; and he ordered Captain Hanes to engage them.

Since Hanes had not been able to re-fuel at Gerona, his Stuarts were nearly out of gas, so he had to consolidate the fuel from the whole company in order to "top-off" just one platoon of five light tanks. Hanes ordered the tank platoon, led by LT Ben R. Morin, to move north from the town of Damortis, where here on 22 December 1941, the platoon of M3 Stuarts ran into Japanese Type 95 light tanks from the Imperial Japanese Army 4th Tank Regiment. In this, the first American tanks manned by US tank crewmen to engage enemy tanks during World War II, the M3's of the 192nd Tank Battalion went up against the equally armed Type 95 light tank, which were armed with the 37mm cannon, but were equipped with diesel engines. The Type 95 light tank had been at the forefront of tank technology when it was fielded in 1935.

In the tank to tank battle that ensued, the lead 192nd tank immediately left the road to maneuver, but was instantly hit and caught fire. The remaining four Stuarts also received hits, but withdrew from the field, only to be destroyed by enemy aircraft later on. Lieutenant Morin was wounded, and he along with his crew were captured.

Both the 192nd and the 194th Tank Battalions continued to skirmish with the 4th Tank Regiment, as they retreated towards Bataan, but tank losses during the fighting required the re-organization of some of the units. Consequently, tank companies were re-organized into ten tank companies with three tank platoons, and one tank for the company commander. During the remaining struggle for Bataan, the two tank battalions tried to defend the beaches, the airfield, and provided support for the infantry until 8 April 1942 when the 192nd and 194th received orders to prepare to destroy their M3s, (Note: The Americans were not successful in destroying all of their tanks as many of the M3 Stuarts were captured and used by the enemy during the war. When the Philippines were liberated in 1944/45, some of those captured M3 Stuart light tanks were taken back by US forces.) upon receiving the code word. The code word "Crash" was transmitted, and the US Army/allies on Bataan surrendered on 9 April 1942.

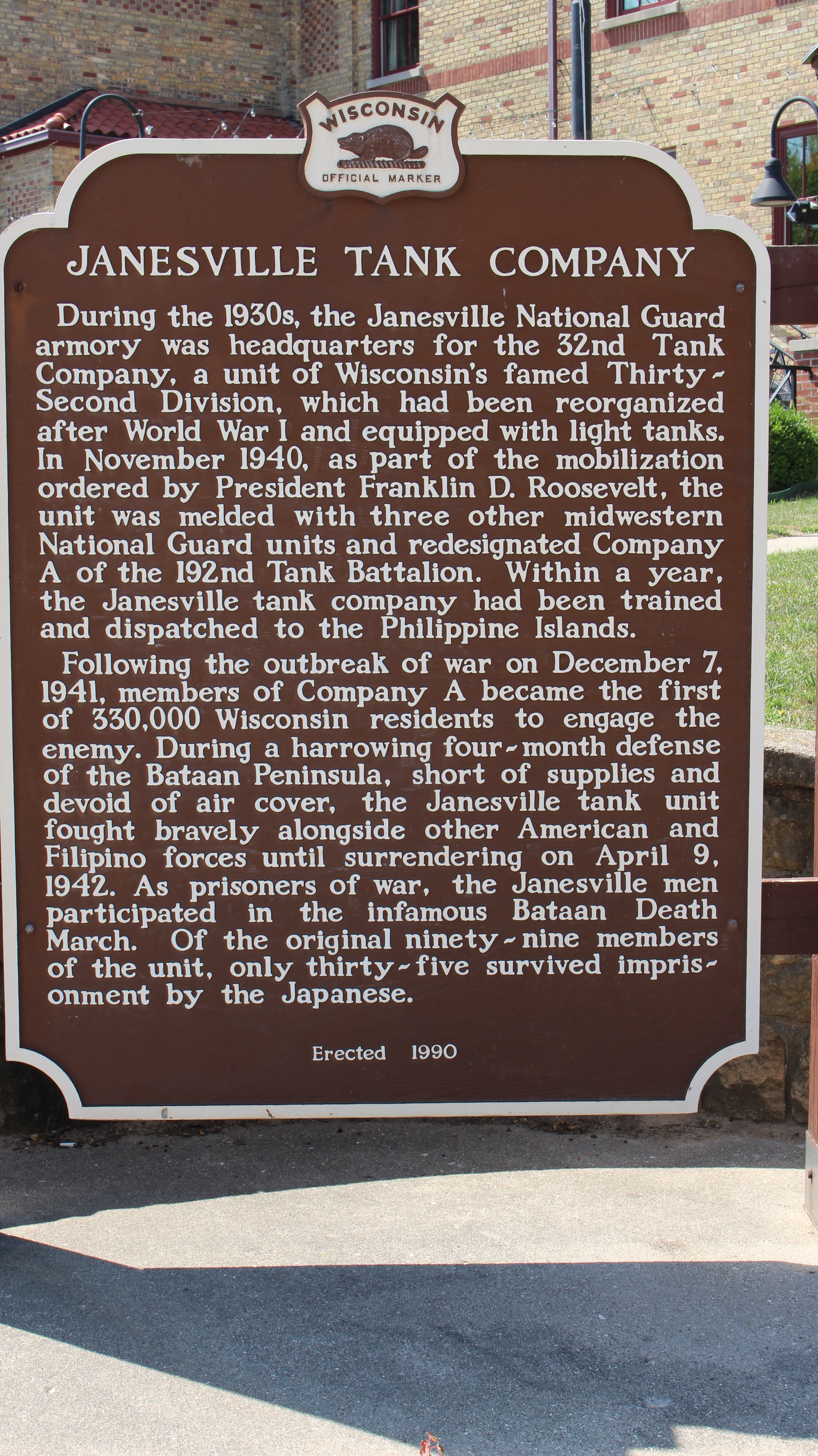
Memorial in Wisconsin

=== Overview ===
The activated Army National Guard 192nd Tank Battalion initially received training at Fort Knox, and Polk. The unit left San Francisco in October 1941, arriving in the Philippines on 20 November 1941. On 22 December 1941, the 192nd Tank Battalion became the first American tank unit to engage enemy armor in tank-to-tank combat during World War II. The unit withdrew to the Bataan Peninsula as part of the general retreat, and ceased to exist on 9 April 1942 when the last surviving American and Philippine forces on the Bataan Peninsula surrendered. Some men went to Corregidor, while others escaped to the jungle. Those who remained participated in the Bataan Death March. They remained prisoners of war until the close of the invasion of the Philippines. Some prisoners at Cabanatuan were rescued by US Army Rangers on 30 December 1944. Others were sent to Japan or other parts of the Japanese empire as laborers. Of the 593 officers and men of the 192nd Tank Battalion who went to the Philippines in October 1941, 328 did not survive the war.

== Memorials ==
Memorials to the 192nd Tank Battalion can be found in the hometowns of all four of its companies.

- In Janesville, Wisconsin, hometown of Company A, the Wisconsin Historical Society erected a marker in front of the former Janesville National Guard Armory in 1990.
- Several memorials can be found in Maywood, Illinois, where Company B originated. A large veterans memorial at Maywood Park includes both a 1946 monument to the battalion and a 2014 monument that included names of soldiers who had been omitted from the first one. Another nearby memorial honors Fr. Benjamin Morin, a Jesuit priest who was the first U.S. tank commander on Bataan, and who survived the Bataan Death March. A mile south of the park, an access road running parallel to the Eisenhower Expressway was named Bataan Drive in 1954 and dedicated by a local group of families called the American Bataan Club.
- In Port Clinton, Ohio, memorials to the 192nd can be found in the center of the city in a veterans park near the site of the old armory. At Camp Perry, there is a memorial naming the members of Company C and another that dedicates a building in honor of the members of Company C who participated in the Bataan Death March.
- Memorials to the 192nd can be found in Harrodsburg, Kentucky, where Company D originated.

== Notes ==
Footnotes

Citations
