= Bohr-e Hajj Nowshad =

Bohr-e Hajj Nowshad بهرحاج نوشاد
- Village
- Location within Iran
- Coordinates: 27°50′12″N 52°20′11″E
- Country: Iran
- Province: Bushehr
- County: Jam
- Bakhsh: Central
- Rural District: Jam

Population (2006)
  - Total: 355
- Time zone: UTC+3:30 (IRST)

Bohr-e Hajj Nowshad (Persian: بهرحاج نوشاد, also Romanized as Bohr-e Ḩājj Nowshād; also known as Bohr-e Ḩājjī Nowshād) is a village in Jam Rural District, in the Central District of Jam County, Bushehr Province, Iran. At the 2006 census, its population was 355, in 83 families.
