= Aliabad, Jam =

Village in Bushehr province, Iran

Coordinates: 27°50′36″N 52°19′19″E

Aliabad Persian: علی‌آباد
- Village
- Location within Iran
- Country: Iran
- Province: Bushehr
- County: Jam
- District: Central
- Rural District: Jam

Population (2016)
  - Total: 1,430
- Time zone: UTC+3:30 (IRST)

Aliabad (Persian: علی‌آباد) (Note: Also romanized as ‘Alīābād) is a village in Jam Rural District of the Central District in Jam County, Bushehr province, Iran.

== Demographics ==
=== Population ===
At the time of the 2006 National Census, the village's population was 904 in 189 households. The following census in 2011 counted 1,336 people in 338 households. The 2016 census measured the population of the village as 1,430 people in 486 households.
