= Jam Rural District =

Rural district in Bushehr province, Iran

Jam Rural District Persian: دهستان جم
- Rural District
- Location within Iran
- Coordinates: 27°48′N 52°22′E
- Country: Iran
- Province: Bushehr
- County: Jam
- District: Central
- Established: 1986
- Capital: Jam

Population (2016)
  - Total: 21,089
- Time zone: UTC+3:30 (IRST)

Jam Rural District (Persian: دهستان جم) is in the Central District of Jam County, Bushehr province, Iran. It is administered from the city of Jam.

== Demographics ==
=== Population ===
At the time of the 2006 National Census, the rural district's population was 14,417 in 2,870 households. There were 20,426 inhabitants in 5,412 households at the following census of 2011. The 2016 census measured the population of the rural district as 21,089 in 5,814 households. The most populous of its 68 villages was Baharestan (now a city), with 5,989 people.

=== Other villages in the rural district ===
- Aliabad
- Baba Mobaraki
- Bas-e Malakhi
- Bohr-e Bagh
- Chaheh
- Qaidi
