= Bore Valley =

Valley in South Georgia

Bore Valley (54°16′S 36°31′W) is a valley that is 0.7 nautical miles (1.3 km) long in a north–south direction, extending from Lewis Pass to Grytviken in Cumberland Bay, South Georgia. It was first surveyed and named "Bores Dal" by the Swedish Antarctic Expedition (SwedAE) under Otto Nordenskiöld, 1901–04, but the form Bore Valley has since become established. The discovery by J. Gunnar Andersson, of the SwedAE, of numerous traces of a former ice covering, proving that ice had once filled the entire valley, led to the name. "Bore" is the Swedish word for Boreas, the Greek god of the north wind. Maidalen, to the north of Lewis Pass, was originally considered to be a part of Bore Valley but has since been determined to be a separate valley.
