= Perforation (disambiguation) =

A perforation is a small hole in a thin material or web.

Perforation may also refer to:

- A leaf feature
- Perforation (oil well), a hole punched in the casing or liner of an oil well to connect it to the reservoir
- Perforation gauge, a term used in philately
- Postage stamp perforation, used to separate postage stamps
- Film perforations, the holes placed in the film stock during manufacturing and used for transporting
- Hair perforation test, a laboratory test used to help distinguish the isolates of dermatophytes
- Hydro-slotted perforation, a process in oil and gas drilling
- Organ perforation, a complete penetration of the wall of a hollow organ in the body, including:
  - Corneal perforation
  - Eardrum perforation
  - Esophageal perforation
  - Gastrointestinal perforation
  - Nasal septum perforation
  - Stercoral perforation
  - Uterine perforation
