= Bohr-e Bagh =

Village in Bushehr province, Iran

Bohr-e Bagh Persian: بهرباغ
- Village
- Location within Iran
- Coordinates: 27°50′16″N 52°20′15″E
- Country: Iran
- Province: Bushehr
- County: Jam
- District: Central
- Rural District: Jam

Population (2016)
  - Total: 2,351
- Time zone: UTC+3:30 (IRST)

Bohr-e Bagh (Persian: بهرباغ) (Note: Also romanized as Bohr-e Bāgh; also known as Bahr, Bahrām-e Bāgh (بهرام باغ), and Bohr) is a village in Jam Rural District of the Central District in Jam County, Bushehr province, Iran.

== Demographics ==
=== Population ===
At the time of the 2006 National Census, the village's population was 1,204 in 283 households. The following census in 2011 counted 1,611 people in 439 households. The 2016 census measured the population of the village as 2,351 people in 687 households.
