= Army Equal Opportunity Program =

The Army Equal Employment Opportunity Program (EEO) is a U.S. Army mandated program designed "to prohibit discrimination in employment because of race, color, religion, sex, national origin, reprisal, disability, age, sexual orientation, gender identity, status as a parent, or other impermissible basis, and to promote the full realization of EEO through a continuing diversity and inclusion program".

In recent years military branches have continued to implement anti-discrimination rules. Starting in 1973, the U.S. Government embarked on reforming sensitivity training which was given to all federal employees. The U.S. Army quickly followed with implementing these new changes. Following the creation of the "Don’t Ask Don’t Tell" policy in 1994 by the Clinton administration, the U.S. Army once again reorganized its stance on internal discrimination. "Don't Ask Don't Tell" was repealed in 2010, allowing openly gay and lesbian military personnel to serve, and the Army EO Program was then established to protect both men and women from any form of discrimination from military personnel.

The controversial program has sparked great divisions among armed forces officials who wonder whether social comfort or unit cohesion, as well as combat efficiency, is more important to the U.S. Army.

== Origins ==
The U.S. Army's first step toward diversity training and appreciation came via the Army Language Program (ALP) in 1946, shortly after the institution's involvement in World War II. The U.S. Army advocated for the expansion of spoken languages other than English among its armed forces personnel in order to attain a strategic military advantage. The ALP marks the first step toward the inclusion philosophy that permeates the current Army EO Program.

The proposal set the groundwork for the U.S. Army's EO Program first introduced in 1973 via the Civil Service Commission. The U.S. government acknowledged a disconnect that existed between anti-discrimination philosophy and the day-to-day functions of its federal institutions and employees. In 1973, the Civil Service Commission first authorized the use of goals and timetables to counter and eventually eliminate rising discrimination in U.S. federal government work.

The goals created centered on strengthening one minority group at a time. These groups included African Americans, religious denominations other than Christianity, mentally and physically disabled individuals, and women. Composing a timetable was difficult for the Civil Service Commission because they were skeptical about whether the changes would impact the efficiency of federal work. Even though the fundamentals of the Army EO Program were authorized, a plan to fully implement it had yet to be devised.

== Development of the program ==
The U.S. Army began to experience a negative stigma in the 1970s and 1980s due to rampant sexual, racial, and gender discrimination. The U.S. government was then motivated to institute the anti-discrimination agenda they formulated in the early 1970s. The first governmental action to eliminate the progression of discrimination in the armed forces was to correct the Uniform Code of Military Justice (UCMJ). The UCMJ are the written laws of the United States Military. The UCMJ was made more responsive to all forms of discrimination by writing into law that the punitive measure for any military personnel engaging in that line of behavior to be an Article 15. An Article 15 is the official form of punitive discrimination for violation of the UCMJ that can result in company level punishment or a criminal charge.

As a result of the changes the U.S. Army made to its legal system regarding discrimination, it was clear that a program that protected victims of discrimination, and helped prevent soldiers from becoming perpetrators of discrimination was needed. The U.S. Army first sought to develop a program that created a specific course of action for victims of discrimination to report acts committed against them. EO offices were established on military bases to conduct the discrimination reporting and investigation processes. The U.S. Army also felt they needed to promote mandatory training that informed soldiers about what is considered a discriminatory action and how they could prevent it.

== Army equal opportunity training ==
Starting in the late 20th century, and continuing into the 21st century, U.S. Army senior officers and congressional officials developed a process for teaching soldiers to competently approach diversity. The method consisted of annual training for all soldiers about how to avoid racial, sexual, and gender discrimination as well as the consequences for UCMJ violations. In addition, soldiers were to be educated about the formal process for reporting any violations of the Army EO policy under UCMJ protocol.

The program began to gain military-wide traction at the beginning of the 21st century as formal training took place and victimized soldiers began reporting violations. The number of cases pertaining to EO violations were too many for senior officers to handle efficiently. An amendment was made to the Army EO Program consisting of enlisted Army EO representatives that would be more accessible to soldiers.

=== Army Equal Opportunity representatives ===
United States Army EO representatives are non-commissioned officers trained to report, instruct, and know the legal policy of discriminatory behavior in the armed forces. These individuals serve as advocates, mediums, and decision-makers for cases of discrimination against victimized soldiers. In order for a non-commissioned officer to become an EO representative, s/he must receive an appointment from Army command, pass a background investigation, and complete extensive sensitivity and legal training. Furthermore, each U.S. Army unit has an EO representative who is in charge of cases of discrimination within that particular unit, and reports violations to U.S. Army judicial officials.

U.S. Army EO representatives also assist in company, battalion, and brigade level training for soldiers. These representatives conduct role-playing, videoing, and situational based training that are designed to foster awareness among soldiers. EO representatives are ultimately held responsible for the racial, sexual, and cultural sensitivity within their respective units.

== Controversy ==
Some arguments pose that focusing on by focusing on EO, the Armed Forces will become distracted from its primary mission. The U.S. Army operates predominantly in a white, male environment and has issues with racism, sexism, and sexual assault. The U.S Army reported 55% of their Active Duty Demographics for the Fiscal Year of 2020 as White. 21% were Black, 16% Hispanic, 5% Asian, and 3% other.

Teaching soldiers, who identify with the majority demographic, to be compassionate of others' experiences and systemic biases of the minority populations within the U.S Army is a ghost of a chance. The social theoretical framework of the Army EO Program hinges on its ability to blend combat aggression and toughness with diverse cultural sensitivity effectively, yet fails to hold accountable its own legalities and social stigmas.

One prominent modern example of this dilemma is the ambivalence towards women operating in combat Military Occupational Specialties (MOS). The Army EO program protects the fair treatment of women in combat-related positions under the UCMJ; however, military culture often characterizes female combat soldiers as inferior and counter-productive due to their inherent physiological disparity concerning muscle mass, bone density, and body fat.

Other recent examples include accepting the transgender community into the Armed Forces with the U.S. Department of Defense's policy addressing those who want to serve in the military and those who are already serving.

=== Don't Ask Don't Tell ===
"Don't Ask Don't Tell" was a U.S. military policy that discouraged the open expression of LGBT servicemen and women in terms of their sexuality. Removal from the armed forces was the punitive measure for violation of this policy. Coinciding with the establishment of the Army EO Program, the Clinton administration worked to repeal "Don't Ask Don't Tell" per Army EO policy. In many ways, the legacy of "Don't Ask Don't Tell" continues to be linked to the Army EO Program both in legality and social stigma. Many soldiers who supported "Don't Ask Don't Tell" now openly criticize the Army EO Program for the same reasons. They primarily connect back to whether combat efficiency or preventing discrimination among units in the armed forces is more important to the long-term vitality of the United States Army.
