= Ennui (sonnet) =

Sonnet by Sylvia Plath (published 2006)

"Ennui" is a sonnet by Sylvia Plath published for the first time in November 2006 in the online literary journal Blackbird. Sylvia Plath wrote the Petrarchan sonnet "Ennui" during her undergraduate years at Smith College.

The first appearance of "Ennui" in print received international attention, from New York City to New Delhi. Reports on the poem were featured in the New York Times, the Washington Post, the Guardian Unlimited, the International Herald Tribune, and other journals.
