= Data drilling =

Data drilling (also drilldown) refers to any of various operations and transformations on tabular, relational, and multidimensional data. The term has widespread use in various contexts, but is primarily associated with specialized software designed specifically for data analysis.

== Common data drilling operations ==
There are certain operations that are common to applications that allow data drilling. Among them are:

Query operations:

- tabular query
- pivot query

=== Tabular query ===
Tabular query operations consist of standard operations on data tables.

Among these operations are:

- search
- sort
- filter (by value)
- filter (by extended function or condition)
- transform (e.g., by adding or removing columns)

Consider the following example:

Fred and Wilma table (Fig 001):

   gender, fname, lname, home
   male, fred, chopin, Poland
   male, fred, flintstone, bedrock
   male, fred, durst, usa
   female, wilma, flintstone, bedrock
   female, wilma, rudolph, usa
   female, wilma, webb, usa
   male, fred, johnson, usa

The preceding is an example of a simple flat file table formatted as comma-separated values. The table includes first name, last name, gender and home country for various people named fred or wilma. Although the example is formatted this way, it is important to emphasize that tabular query operations (as well as all data drilling operations) can be applied to any conceivable data type, regardless of the underlying formatting. The only requirement is that the data be readable by the software application in use.

=== Pivot query ===
A pivot query allows multiple representations of data according to different dimensions. This query type is similar to tabular query, except it also allows data to be represented in summary format, according to a flexible user-selected hierarchy. This class of data drilling operation is formally, (and loosely) known by different names, including crosstab query, pivot table, data pilot, selective hierarchy, intertwingularity and others.

To illustrate the basics of pivot query operations, consider the Fred and Wilma table (Fig 001). A quick scan of the data reveals that the table has redundant information. This redundancy could be consolidated using an outline or a tree structure or in some other way. Moreover, once consolidated, the data could have many different alternate layouts.

Using a simple text outline as output, the following alternate layouts are all possible with a pivot query:

Summarize by gender (Fig 001):

   female
       flintstone, wilma
       rudolph, wilma
       webb, wilma
   male
       chopin, fred
       flintstone, fred
       durst, fred
       johnson, fred
   
   (Dimensions = gender; Tabular fields = lname, fname;)

Summarize by home, lname (Fig 001):

   bedrock
       flintstone
           fred
           wilma
   Poland
       chopin
           fred
   usa
       ...
   
   (Dimensions = home, lname; Tabular fields = fname;)

==== Uses ====
Pivot query operations are useful for summarizing a corpus of data in multiple ways, thereby illustrating different representations of the same basic information. Although this type of operation appears prominently in spreadsheets and desktop database software, its flexibility is arguably under-utilized. There are many applications that allow only a 'fixed' hierarchy for representing data, and this represents a substantial limitation.

== Drillup ==
Drillup is the opposite of drilldown. For example, if you drilldown to see the revenue of one product, then you might want to drillup to see the revenue of all products.
