= Annual training =

Annual Training (AT) refers to the yearly training period conducted by military reserve forces around the world.

== United Kingdom ==
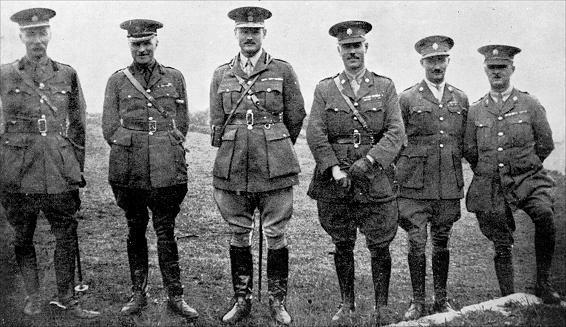
Officers of the 8th Battalion, Worcestershire Regiment at Swanage in August 1924 for AT.

Annual training in the United Kingdom is approximately one month per year, and has only changed by seven days in the last three hundred years.

== United States ==
Annual training for the National Guard and Reserve components of the United States military are pursuant to law and military service directives.

Usually advertised as two weeks each year that personnel must attend, annual training periods have increased to as much as month-long events during the Iraq War. This training may be conducted at the home unit, a reserve unit's supported active duty command, a national training center, or any other appropriate location.

The purpose is to maintain and improve the skill level of the individual with some real military experience of work or exercise under supervision. Training can be at giving locations in the continental United States or abroad with the home unit or any other unit of the military for support. Any other additional dates will be considered another 15 days from another fiscal year and will be given back to back for the total amount of 30 days of annual training.

Also, annual training can be before or after any additional orders for active duty for special work in addition with annual training or in conjunction with annual training. Active duty for special work can be from one day to 365 consecutive days, or 2 to 3 years maximum provide leave accumulated is paid or granted during the period.
