= 2026 Kazakh constitutional referendum =

- 15 March 2026
- "Do you accept the new Constitution of the Republic of Kazakhstan, the draft of which was published in the mass media on 12 February 2026?"
- Voting system: Majority vote

Results
Choice	Votes	%
Yes	7,954,667	89.86%
No	898,099	10.14%
Valid votes	8,852,766	96.99%
Invalid or blank votes	146,558	1.61%
Total votes	9,127,192	100.00%
Registered voters/turnout	12,482,613	73.12%
- Results by region Yes: 70–80% 80–90% >90%

A constitutional referendum was held in Kazakhstan on 15 March 2026 to determine whether to approve the draft of a new constitution of Kazakhstan. According to official results, it was supported by nearly 90% of voters, with 10% against, and a turnout of 73%, the highest for any national vote since 2019 and the largest for a referendum since 1995. This was the fifth referendum since Kazakhstan's independence and the third constitutional referendum since 2022.

The referendum followed President Kassym-Jomart Tokayev's 2025 State of the Nation Address, in which he announced parliamentary reforms aimed at amending the 1995 Constitution of Kazakhstan, with a constitutional referendum initially planned for 2027 to implement this package of amendments. However, discussions within the working group expanded the scope of the proposed reforms—including restructuring parliament, redefining the balance of powers between state institutions, and expanding constitutional guarantees of human, digital, and environmental rights—prompting consideration of an entirely new constitution. A Constitutional Commission was subsequently established to draft the new text, and after a series of meetings and public consultations that gathered thousands of proposals from citizens and experts.

The draft constitution proposed significant institutional changes, rewriting approximately 84% of the 1995 Constitution and introducing 95 articles, including replacing the bicameral Parliament of Kazakhstan with a unicameral Kurultai, reintroducing the office of vice president, ensuring the separation of religion and state, and revising provisions related to the judiciary, civil rights, and the structure of the executive branch. Some political analysts and civil society groups argued that certain provisions could strengthen presidential authority and affect presidential succession. The draft also constitutionally codified the prohibition of same-sex marriage in Kazakhstan by defining marriage as a union between a man and a woman. Following its submission to Tokayev on 11 February 2026, he signed a decree on holding the republican referendum.

The referendum campaign was led by the National Coalition "For the People's Constitution of a Fair and Progressive Kazakhstan", which organized nationwide events, online initiatives, and promotional materials in support of the draft constitution. While authorities framed the vote as a modernization effort, critics reported legal pressure, fines, social media censorship, and restrictions on independent polling. Legal challenges to the referendum were rejected by the courts. Due to legal and social circumstances, the draft constitution was euphemistically referred to as "sour cream" on social media to avoid crackdown.

Exit polls released around midnight of 16 March 2026 indicated strong support for the proposed constitution. Later that morning, the Central Referendum Commission announced preliminary results confirming that an overwhelming majority of voters had approved the proposal. Final results were confirmed on 17 March. On the same day, Tokayev signed a decree officially adopting the new constitution, which took effect on 1 July 2026. The date of the referendum, 15 March, was also designated as an annual Constitution Day.

== Background ==
Following Kazakhstan's independence in 1991, the Constitution of Kazakhstan has undergone several revisions and replacements through referendums and legislative amendments. The 1995 constitutional referendum replaced the 1993 constitution, establishing a strong semi-presidential system and a bicameral parliament consisting of the Mäjilis and the Senate. The bicameral Parliament of Kazakhstan was controversial, as the unitary state had no precedent for two chambers, it failed to improve representation or legislative quality, and the rise of Amanat's ruling party dominance weakened the Senate, which political scientist Sultanbek Sultangaliev described as the upper house as a "Chamber of Honorary Pensioners" duplicating the Mäjilis' functions, prompting democratic opposition-led calls since the late 1990s and early 2000s to return to a unicameral system.

In the years that followed, further amendments were introduced to the 1995 constitution, gradually adjusting the balance of power between the presidency, parliament, and other state institutions. In June 2022, a nationwide referendum supported by 77% of voters approved a major package of amendments to the 1995 Constitution. The reforms reduced the powers of the presidency, strengthened Parliament, abolished the privileged constitutional status of the Elbasy (Leader of the Nation), and reinforced provisions on human rights and institutional accountability. Officials presented the referendum as laying the foundations of a "New Kazakhstan" in the aftermath of the January Events. A separate package of amendments was adopted by Parliament in September 2022, introducing a new restriction on the presidency: a single, non-renewable seven-year term. The same measure also restored the capital's name from Nur-Sultan to Astana.

Following President Kassym-Jomart Tokayev's political reset that concluded with the 2023 legislative elections, some Kazakh and independent media speculated that the authorities might once again consider constitutional reforms, either to extend presidential powers or restructure state institutions. In January 2024, President Tokayev dismissed these rumours in an interview with Egemen Qazaqstan, asserting that the seven-year presidential term "will never change again" and that no further changes to the Constitution were planned for the near future.

On the eve of the 30th anniversary of the 1995 Constitution of Kazakhstan, debate over the document's future arose as Kazakh online media reported an independently drafted third constitution by legal scholar Jumageldy Eliubaev, proposing changes to the structure of government, parliamentary powers, presidential terms, and state symbolism. According to Orda.kz, Eliubaev's draft—published on the legal information platform "PARAGRAF" before later being shortly removed—allegedly attracted interest within the presidential administration amidst lingering uncertainty over the direction of Kazakhstan's constitutional future. However, during the address, President Tokayev noted that while proposals for a new constitution had been discussed, reforms over the years, including changes after the 2022 referendum, had modernized the Basic Law and preserved its core principles, ruling out calls for a complete replacement.

Nevertheless, on 8 September 2025, President Tokayev, at the State of the Nation Address, proposed holding a referendum on parliamentary reforms, noting that the proposals should be thoroughly discussed over the coming year, with a referendum possibly taking place in 2027.

== Electoral system ==
In Kazakhstan, a constitutional referendum is defined as a republican referendum (Kazakh: республикалық референдум). Republican referendums are regulated by the Constitutional Law No. 2592 "On Republican Referendum" in the 1995 Constitution of Kazakhstan, which defines them as "a national vote on drafts of the Constitution, constitutional laws, laws, and decisions on other most important issues of public life in the Republic of Kazakhstan".

In accordance with Article 10 of the Constitutional Law "On Republican Referendum", the exclusive right to call a republican referendum is reserved to the president of Kazakhstan. At the same time, Parliament, the government, or at least 200,000 citizens representing all regions of the republic may submit a proposal to the president to hold a referendum.

Under Article 17, the president may call a referendum on proposed constitutional amendments, introduce amendments and additions to the Constitution without conducting a referendum, or reject the proposed changes entirely. A presidential rejection may be overridden by a four-fifths majority vote of both houses of Parliament. Article 18 provides that a decision to hold a referendum is established by presidential decree, which sets the date of the vote, the issue or issues submitted to referendum, and the legal consequences of its outcome. The text of the draft Constitution or amendments must subsequently be published in the mass media.

Pursuant to Article 19, a referendum must be held no earlier than one month and no later than three months after the issuance of the decree, although the president may establish different terms in exceptional cases.

Article 31 stipulates that decision on the issue submitted to referendum is considered as adopted only if at least 50% of registered voters participate, a simple majority vote "yes" and for constitutional changes, more than half of voters in at least two-thirds of the regions, cities of republican significance (including the capital of Astana) approve it.

== Drafting and proposal ==
On 8 October 2025, President Tokayev signed a decree establishing a 33-member Working Group on Parliamentary Reform, led by State Counsellor Erlan Qarin. The group includes parliamentary deputies from the Mäjilis and the Senate, members of the Assembly of People of Kazakhstan, leaders of parliamentary party factions, as well as heads of scientific institutes, prominent scholars specializing in constitutional law and the theory of state and law, and experts and members of the National Kurultai.

Between October 2025 and January 2026, the working group held a total of six meetings, during which seven political parties and 16 public organizations submitted proposals for constitutional reform, and discussions focused on the composition of the future parliament, its term of office, number of deputies, quotas, electoral procedures, interaction with other branches of power, the main directions of the legislative process, and the parliament's powers in ensuring the functioning of state bodies.

During the 5th meeting of the National Kurultai, Tokayev assessed that the anticipated number of amendments would be "much greater" and described the process as a step toward adopting a new Constitution.

=== Drafting ===
On 21 January 2026, Tokayev signed a decree establishing the Constitutional Commission, composed of over 120 members, including National Kurultai representatives, prominent lawyers, media leaders, local assembly (mäslihat) chairpersons, regional public council members, and other professionals, and headed by Constitutional Court chairwoman Elvira Äzimova.

On 31 January, after six meetings, the Constitutional Commission reported to Tokayev that planned amendments affecting about 84% of the 1995 constitution had led it to conclude that a completely new Constitution should be drafted, proposed publishing the first full draft for public discussion. Mäjilis deputy Snejanna Imasheva noted that this approach complies with Paragraph 9 of Article 26 of the Law "On Legal Acts", which requires adoption of a new edition if more than half of a legal act is amended. The first draft of the new Constitution was published the same day. For the first time, the draft constitution's preamble defines human rights and freedoms as the Kazakh state's top priority, including the right to life, personal inviolability, data protection, and a Miranda rule.

Throughout early February, the Constitutional Commission continued to hold meetings to refine the draft constitution, incorporating public and expert feedback. Among the revisions were adjustments to the wording of the provision on the status of the Russian language in state institutions, clarification of constitutional guarantees concerning free education and universal health care, proposals to strengthen protections of private property and housing rights, and discussions on institutional mechanisms such as the grounds and procedure for the dissolution of Parliament.

=== Draft constitution ===
On 11 February 2026, at its 12th meeting, the Constitutional Commission declared that the draft of the new Constitution was ready for a nationwide referendum. That same day, the commission submitted its final draft of the new Constitution to President Tokayev, who praised the commission's work, highlighted the draft's role in modernizing institutional foundations and supporting sustainable development, noted the high level of public discussion and participation, announcing that he would sign a decree to hold a republican referendum on its adoption in "near future".

The final draft, published on 12 February 2026, comprised a preamble and 95 articles across 11 sections, addressing the foundations of Kazakhstan's constitutional order, human rights, state institutions, and procedures for constitutional amendments. Among the notable provisions:

- Foundations of the constitutional order: The draft affirms Kazakhstan as a democratic, secular, unitary state, emphasizes the rule of law, and guarantees the sovereignty and territorial integrity of the country. It defines state symbols and establishes Kazakh as the state language, while Russian is recognized for official use.
- Human rights and freedoms: Individual rights are prioritized throughout the document. The draft explicitly abolishes the death penalty, protects privacy and digital rights, guarantees family and personal freedoms, and affirms freedom of conscience and religion.
- Structure of government: A unicameral parliament (Kurultai) with 145 deputies elected under a proportional system is established. The draft also introduces a vice president and a People's Council to serve as a national dialogue platform.
- Judiciary and legal oversight: Judicial independence is reinforced, with provisions for the Constitutional Court and courts of general jurisdiction.
- Local self-government: Municipalities and regions are granted autonomy, with clearly defined powers and responsibilities.
- Electoral and referendum provisions: Citizens' rights to participate in governance through free elections and referendum are codified, alongside procedures for amending the Constitution.
- Social and cultural rights: Gender equality, the protection of traditional family values, secular education, and the promotion of culture, science, and innovation are highlighted.
- Environmental and sustainable development principles: The state's responsibility for natural resources and ecological protection is recognized, alongside commitments to sustainable development.

According to the Constitutional Commission, the final text incorporated editorial and substantive revisions based on approximately 10,000 proposals received during the public consultation process.

==== Criticism ====
The draft constitution drew criticism from legal experts, political analysts, and civil society organizations. Many argued that the text had been produced on an unusually fast timeline, with the Constitutional Commission publishing the draft just ten days after it was formed. Critics said this left little opportunity for meaningful public consultation or debate on changes affecting much of the existing constitution.

Observers also expressed concern that the reforms could strengthen presidential power at the expense of the legislature. Provisions allowing the president to dissolve the proposed unicameral Kurultai if it repeatedly rejected presidential nominees, issue decrees with the force of law during such periods and appoint key state officials without parliamentary approval were cited as particularly significant. The introduction of a vice president appointed by the president, and a presidentially appointed People's Council with legislative initiative, was also seen as a potential way to concentrate power and influence future presidential succession.

Human rights groups raised additional concerns about civil liberties. They highlighted the removal of the clause giving international treaties precedence over domestic law, vague restrictions based on "public morality" or "national values", and the constitutional definition of marriage as a union exclusively between a man and a woman. Changes to the status of the Russian language in state institutions were also noted, with some suggesting they could affect inter-ethnic relations. Critics warned that provisions affecting freedom of expression, peaceful assembly, and association could be used to limit dissent and weaken institutional checks and balances.

Government officials rejected these concerns, emphasizing that the reforms were intended to modernize governance, strengthen institutions, and improve public participation in policymaking. President Kassym-Jomart Tokayev also criticized some domestic opponents of the draft constitution, stating that certain critics had "crossed the red line" by undermining national interests and urging them to better understand the substance of the proposed reforms.

=== Ballot question and referendum date ===
Speculation about the date of the referendum has arisen, with political scientist Gaziz Abishev suggesting that, if the presidential decree on referendum date were issued during the 5th meeting of the National Kurultai, the vote could take place as early as 22 March 2026, coinciding with the Nowruz holiday and immediately following Eid al-Fitr. However, on 20 January 2026, President Tokayev at the 5th meeting of the National Kurultai stated that the date for the republican referendum would be set after the Constitutional Commission analyzed and summarized all proposals and prepared a draft of the specific changes.

On 11 February 2026, President Tokayev signed a decree setting the referendum on the draft of the new Constitution for 15 March 2026 and approving the official referendum question, which was to appear on ballots in the Kazakh and Russian languages as follows:

Kazakh: Жобасы бұқаралық ақпарат құралдарында 2026 жылғы 12 ақпанда жарияланған Қазақстан Республикасының жаңа Конституциясын қабылдайсыз ба?
Russian: Принимаете ли Вы новую Конституцию Республики Казахстан, проект которой опубликован в средствах массовой информации 12 февраля 2026 года?
English translation: "Do you accept the new Constitution of the Republic of Kazakhstan, the draft of which was published in the mass media on 12 February 2026?"

=== Calendar plan ===
On 12 February 2026, following the issuance of the presidential decree on the referendum, the Central Referendum Commission adopted Resolution No. 6/10 "On approval of the calendar plan of main events for the preparation and conduct of the republican referendum scheduled for 15 March 2026", which established the following timetable:

- 12 February – 14 March 2026: Campaigning period
- 21 February 2026: Approval of commission compositions and precinct boundaries
- 22 February 2026: Transmission of voter lists
- 27 February – 4 March 2026: Informing citizens of voting locations and times
- 12–14 March 2026: Delivery of ballots to precincts
- 14 March 2026: Election silence
- 15 March 2026: Main voting day (7:00 – 20:00 UTC+5)

== Positions ==
Choice	Parties	Political orientation	Leader	Ref
Choice	Parliamentary	Political orientation	Leader	Ref
Support	For the People's Constitution of a Fair and Progressive Kazakhstan!	Reformism	Erlan Qoşanov	
Support	Amanat	Big tent	Erlan Qoşanov	
Support	Auyl	Agrarianism	Serik Egizbaev	
Support	Respublica	E-democracy	Aidarbek Qojanazarov	
Support	Aq Jol	National liberalism	Azat Peruaşev	
Support	People's Party of Kazakhstan	Democratic socialism	Ermukhamet Ertisbaev	
Support	Nationwide Social Democratic Party	Social democracy	Ashat Raqymjanov	
Support	Non-parliamentary			
Support	Baytaq	Green politics	Azamathan Ämirtai	

== Campaign ==
=== Support ===
Logo used by the National Coalition in campaign support of the referendum in both Kazakh (top) and Russian (bottom)

Aidos Sarym, a deputy of the Mäjilis and member of the Constitutional Commission, stated that the commission was prepared to establish a republican headquarters and visit all regions of the country, emphasizing its experience, willingness to listen to citizens, and confidence that the reform was historically justified.

On 12 February 2026, a National Coalition "For the People's Constitution of a Fair and Progressive Kazakhstan!" was established in Astana, uniting representatives of five political parties and more than 300 public organizations in support of the draft new Constitution. The coalition, headed by Mäjilis chairman Erlan Qoşanov (Amanat), stated that the proposed Basic Law would modernize the political system, strengthen social guarantees, and expand citizen participation in governance, and announced plans to conduct nationwide outreach and campaign activities ahead of the referendum.

From 13 February 2026, regional headquarters of the coalition were opened across Kazakhstan. On 15 February, the National Coalition organized a youth concert at Khan Shatyr in Astana, attended by more than 10,000 people in support of the constitutional referendum, featuring performances by famous Kazakh artists and speeches encouraging participation while emphasizing modernization, sovereignty, civic engagement, and institutional reform.

On 21 February 2026, an expert forum "New Constitution: New Architecture of Trust and Development" was held in Astana, organized by the Kazakhstan Institute for Strategic Studies and the Amanat Party Institute of Public Policy. Participants, including State Counsellor Erlan Qarin, deputies of the Mäjilis, and legal scholars, discussed the draft Constitution's provisions on political reform, institutional restructuring, public accountability, and human rights. Qarin stated that the draft Constitution reflected evolving societal demands, including environmental protection, women's rights, traditional values, and a clearer affirmation of secularism, describing it as a "social contract" outlining Kazakhstan's long-term development priorities such as science, education, and innovation.

The National Coalition also organised an online initiative encouraging social media users to add themed frames to profile pictures promoting the referendum via the Twibbonize platform, with organisers stating that more than 80,000 users participated.

In the weeks preceding the referendum, several large public events were organized in support of the proposed Constitution and upcoming referendum. On 28 February, more than 12,000 people attended a concert and public dialogue event titled "Jastar Tandauy – Jana Ata Zan" at Maxi Mall in Oskemen, where officials, activists, and performers promoted civic participation and support for the reforms. On 1 March, similar pro-referendum events were held in Almaty and Astana, gathering over 10,000 and approximately 5,000 participants respectively, featuring concerts, speeches by youth representatives, parliamentarians, and members of the National Coalition, as well as public messaging encouraging participation in the referendum and explaining the proposed constitutional changes. In Almaty, the "ALGYS FEST" concert at Aport Mall East attracted over 5,000 attendees and included performances by popular artists alongside addresses by representatives of the city coalition in support of the draft Constitution. A youth concert titled "Jas Stars" held in Almaty at the Baluan Sholak Sports Palace as part of Kazakhstan's "Year of Artificial Intelligence" gathered more than 5,000 participants and featured musical performances, robotic stage elements including a robo-DJ Temirbek, and speeches encouraging participation in the referendum.

During an International Women's Day ceremony on 8 March 2026, President Kassym-Jomart Tokayev described the draft constitution submitted to referendum as a "historical document" that would strengthen Kazakhstan's independence, support development in the era of artificial intelligence and mass digitalization, and stated that adopting a new constitution was the "most important and urgent task" for the state.

In March 2026, an open-air concert and drone show were held at the EXPO International Exhibition Center in Astana in support of the draft constitution, featuring performances by Kazakh artists and an aerial drone display forming symbolic shapes in the night sky promoting the referendum.

On 12 March 2026, during the Republican Forum of Maslihat Deputies of All Levels, Tokayev called on citizens, particularly young people, to participate in the referendum, stating that the vote would allow them to "write their name in the history of Kazakhstan" by contributing to the adoption of the country's new constitution.

On 13 March 2026, the National Coalition held its final meeting at the Presidential Center in Astana ahead of the referendum. Speakers included chairman of the Majilis Erlan Qoşanov, state counsellor Erlan Qarin, and deputy prime minister and minister of culture and information Aida Balaeva. During the meeting, Qarin described the proposed constitution as the beginning of the country's modernization and expressed support for the referendum. The same day, around 20,000 people attended an open-air rally in support of the proposed constitution at the Qaisar Arena in Kyzylorda. The event featured performances by Kazakh artists including Madina Saduakasova and Kairat Nurtas, as well as speeches by local officials and members of the nationwide coalition supporting the referendum.

According to organizers, more than 23,000 informational meetings were held across Kazakhstan during the campaign period, involving over 5.4 million participants, while regional coalition members also organized more than 880 additional events attended by around 190,000 people.

=== Media coverage and agitation ===
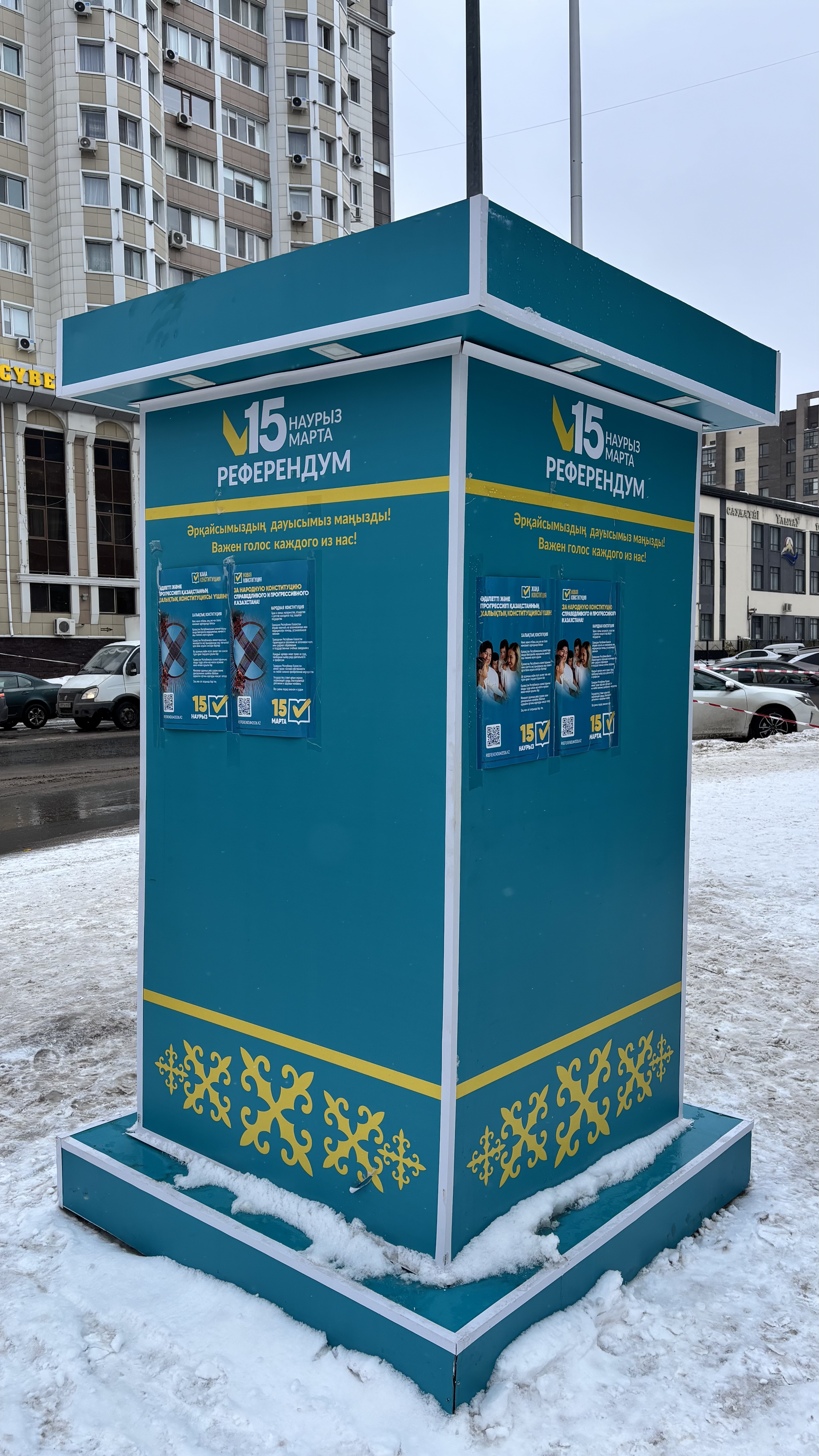
An informational advertising kiosk used for the 2026 referendum in Astana

On 14 February 2026, the Qazaqstan TV channel hosted a six-hour live online marathon "Referendum-2026" from 12:00 to 18:00 UTC+5. The broadcast widely covered by republican television channels and major internet portals on YouTube and Facebook, during which around 100 experts, lawmakers, lawyers, and public figures discussed key provisions of the draft Constitution, including sovereignty, human rights, law and order, parliamentary reform, environmental and social policy, and other proposed changes.

In the weeks preceding the referendum, a public information campaign was visible in major cities. In Astana, countdown timers displaying the number of days remaining until the vote were installed on prominent landmarks, including the Ailand Ferris Wheel and the Kazakhstan Temir Joly headquarters. In Almaty, the Almaty Tower displayed nighttime thematic lighting incorporating state symbols and the referendum date.

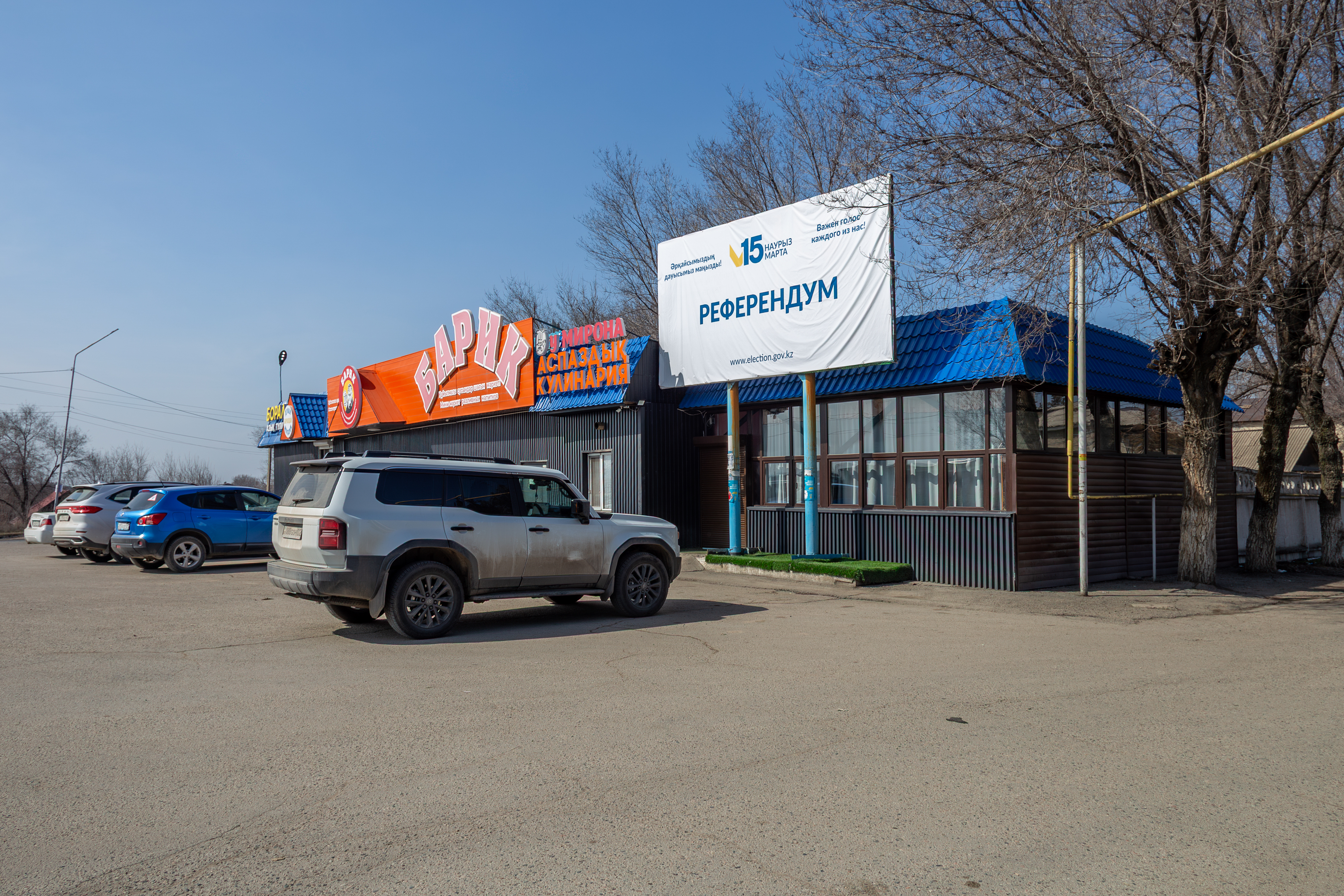
Billboard promoting the referendum in Boralday, Almaty Region

Promotional materials were also placed in major transport hubs, including airports and railway stations, while in shopping centres informational screens appeared in electronics stores. Videos explaining the draft Constitution were broadcast in cinemas nationwide prior to film screenings. In addition, themed materials were placed on public transport in cities and regional centres, including exterior decorations and posters and digital screens inside buses for which approximately 730 fleet were involved in the campaign. Approximately 2,400 banners and LED screens installed in major cities and regional centres, featuring public figures, professionals, and families alongside pro-referendum slogans.

In early March 2026, a social media video featuring an AI-generated snow leopard, Almaty's city symbol, circulated online urging residents to participate in the referendum, setting the first trend of using artificial intelligence as part of a modern digital outreach effort aimed at increasing voter turnout, particularly among young people.

On 8 March 2026, activists of the Jana Adamdar movement held a women's march in Almaty in support of the referendum, calling on citizens to participate in the vote under the slogan "My voice is my strength" (Kazakh: Менің дауысым – менің күшім).

=== Criticism of campaign regulations ===
Lawyers and public activists criticized provisions of the Constitutional Law "On the Republican Referendum" that allow civil servants and government officials to participate in referendum campaigning, arguing that such rules created unequal campaign conditions and enabled the use of administrative resources to favour the "Yes" vote and called for legislative revisions. Justice Minister Erlan Särsembaev rejected these concerns at a briefing in the Mäjilis, stating that the Constitutional Law "On the Republican Referendum" does not contain serious contradictions and allows civil servants and government officials to participate in referendum campaigning under existing legislation, adding that any potential revisions to the law could be considered after the referendum vote is held.

== Controversies ==
=== Restrictions on independent polling ===
During the referendum campaign, several journalists, media outlets, and individuals were fined under Article 120 of the Code of Administrative Offenses for publishing or conducting referendum-related public opinion polls without complying with statutory notification and eligibility requirements. On 11 February 2026, the Specialized Administrative Court of Uralsk fined "Journalistic Initiative" LLP, the founder of Uralsk Weekly, 30 MCI (₸129,750) for publishing a referendum-related public opinion poll on its Telegram channel. Editor-in-chief Tamara Esliamova was summoned to the prosecutor's office after authorities classified a Telegram post asking readers whether they would participate in the referendum as an unlawful public opinion poll, a characterization she disputed, while prosecutors maintained that such polls required prior notification to the Central Election Commission (CEC).

On 13 February 2026, the Administrative Court of Almaty fined Radio Free Europe/Radio Liberty correspondent Maqpal Muqanqyzy for violating regulations governing public opinion polling during the referendum campaign after she posted a social media question asking whether respondents planned to participate in the referendum. The court imposed a fine of 15 MIC (₸64,875), later reduced by 30 percent due to family circumstances. Muqanqyzy rejected the accusation, arguing that the post did not constitute a formal public opinion poll and did not influence the referendum process, and announced plans to appeal. Defense motions seeking clarification from election authorities on whether social media polls fall under electoral legislation were dismissed by the court.

Following the ruling, media lawyer Olga Didenko called on the CEC to clarify whether social media user polls qualify as public opinion polling under the law, arguing that equating informal online voting tools with formal sociological surveys creates legal uncertainty due to the absence of recognized research methodology, sampling, and representativeness standards. In a subsequent public response, the CEC stated that referendum-related polls may only be conducted by authorized legal entities that comply with statutory notification and methodological requirements and warned that violations may result in administrative liability.

As of 19 February 2026, the Prosecutor General's Office reported that four violations related to referendum polling had been identified, including three unlawful public opinion surveys and one instance of publishing results without the required documentation; two of the surveys were conducted by private individuals and one by a legal entity that failed to notify the CEC in advance, resulting in administrative fines for two individuals and one legal entity.

On 20 February 2026, the CEC refused permission for the Demoscope public opinion bureau, operated by the MediaNet International Center for Journalism, to conduct a survey on public perceptions of the constitutional reform, citing legal provisions prohibiting foreign funding of referendum-related activities. In an issued response, MediaNet disputed the decision, arguing that public opinion research does not constitute referendum support activities and that the refusal limited independent monitoring and access to reliable information about public attitudes toward the reform.

On 13 March 2026, First Vice Minister of Culture and Information Qanat Isqaqov reported to the CEC that monitoring of referendum campaigning had identified 26 violations of electoral law, most involving unauthorized opinion polls on online platforms, while no violations were recorded in traditional media.

=== Yes-vote social media profile pictures ===
The editorial office of Arnapress.kz reported that employees in the cultural sector in Semey received messages in private work chats with links to create and post avatars on social media in support of the new draft Constitution, with instructions for selecting a frame from ten image options and recording participation. From there, screenshots and copies of these messages publicly circulated on social media. During a Radio7 broadcast on Arna News, Doctor of Law Maigul Matayeva stated that such actions could violate the human rights of those receiving the messages.

Officials, including Senator Olga Bulavkina and Vice Minister of Energy Suñğat Esimhanov in a conversation with BES.media, said that the usage of these avatars was a personal decision, that no official instructions had been issued, and that they had not encountered or given any such requirements. The messages reportedly encouraged employees of state and quasi-public sectors to update their profile pictures with thematic images supporting the referendum.

=== Campaign pressure allegations ===
In February 2026, several citizens reported receiving calls from police officers or local akimats after publishing social media posts opposing the draft Constitution, with some alleging they were asked to delete their posts. At a 23 February briefing, Central Referendum Commission member Lyazzat Suindik stated that while citizens have the legal right to campaign both for and against the referendum under the law, the Commission does not have the authority to intervene in actions taken by law enforcement bodies.

Legal experts and civil society representatives argued that the reported incidents raised concerns about freedom of expression, noting that although the Law "On the Republican Referendum" guarantees the right to publicly express opinions, other administrative provisions related to "false information" or public order may be applied in practice.

On 25 February 2026, Deputy Interior Minister Sanjar Adilov denied reports that police or akimat officials were calling citizens who criticized the draft Constitution or demanding the removal of opposing social media posts, stating that he had no information confirming such allegations and emphasizing at a briefing in the Mäjilis that law enforcement bodies operate within the framework of maintaining public order and the principle of "law and order".

On 26 February 2026, public figure Orazaly Erjanov was charged with obstructing the exercise of electoral rights in connection with social media posts about the referendum, which Kazakh authorities said contained false information and calls for a boycott; he had previously been detained and sentenced to 10 days of administrative arrest. That same day, the Facebook and Instagram accounts of journalist Vadim Boreyko, founder of the YouTube channel GIPERBOREY, were allegedly hacked, with unauthorized posts containing false and defamatory content published on his behalf. Boreyko stated that the incident occurred shortly after his channel released an interview with Legal Media Center head Diana Okremova discussing alleged intimidation ahead of the referendum and a report on the detention of Erjanov. Boreyko confirmed the hacking to Radio Free Europe/Radio Liberty, stating that he lost access to his accounts following the incident. On 5 March 2026, a court ordered the pre-trial detention of Erjanov for two months as part of the investigation into the case alleging obstruction of electoral rights related to his social media posts about the referendum.

On 27 February 2026, law enforcement officials visited the home of journalist Sabyr Maqajanov in Taldykorgan after he used a social media avatar expressing opposition to the draft Constitution, which authorities described as part of "explanatory work" related to the referendum; no charges or specific legal violations were cited, and a planned follow-up meeting at the prosecutor's office did not take place.

Amidst the criticism against the new Constitution on social media, lawyer Gulmira Birjanova in an interview with Radio Free Europe/Radio Liberty said that "control of public opinion is increasing" ahead of the referendum and warned that legal pressure on journalists and social media users could create a "cooling effect" on freedom of expression in Kazakhstan.

In March 2026, several journalists, bloggers, and media outlets reported that social media posts criticizing the draft constitution were removed from platforms operated by Meta Platforms, including Facebook and Instagram, following mass complaints alleging copyright violations. Editors of the independent outlet Respublika.kz and blogger Murat Daniyar stated that multiple posts were deleted after complaints were filed by an anonymous user named "Giorgio Armani" and suggested the reports may have been coordinated by Kazakh authorities to suppress criticism of the referendum campaign.

=== Legal challenges against the referendum ===
On 25 February 2026, civil activist Alnur Ilyashev submitted a lawsuit against President Kassym-Jomart Tokayev with the Specialized Inter-District Administrative Court of Astana, challenging the legality of the Presidential Decree No. 1170 of 11 February 2026 in appointing the referendum. Ilyashev argued that the draft Constitution violated the Article 3 of Constitutional Law "On the Republican Referendum" and citizens' rights to independently nominate parliamentary candidates by establishing a new party-list system for forming the Kurultai and altering fundamental constitutional principles, and requested the decree be declared unconstitutional from its adoption.

On 27 February 2026, the Astana Inter-District Administrative Court rejected activist Ilyashev's complaint against Tokayev, thereby upholding the presidential decree of holding the referendum.

=== Misinformation and rumours ===
In March 2026, several cases of misinformation and fraud related to the referendum circulated on social media and messaging platforms. In Almaty, police brought a woman to administrative responsibility after she published a post claiming that pre-filled ballots were being distributed ahead of the vote. According to the Almaty Police Department, an investigation determined that the materials shown in the post were not official ballot papers but informational brochures explaining the voting procedure; the author later acknowledged the information was inaccurate and deleted the publication.

On 9 March, the Center for Combating Disinformation of the Central Communications Service under the President of Kazakhstan warned about videos circulating online that allegedly showed ballot box stuffing connected to the referendum. According to the center, analysis found that approximately 32 of the videos originated from unrelated events in other countries or from previous years, while others were staged or edited and distributed without context.

The center also reported additional misleading claims circulating online, including posts alleging that referendum ballots were being distributed door-to-door in several cities. Authorities clarified that ballots are issued only at polling stations on voting day and that door-to-door visits conducted before the referendum were solely intended to inform citizens about the date and location of voting. Nurlan Äbdirov, chairman of the Central Referendum Commission, also dismissed the claims, stating that ballots are strictly controlled documents delivered to polling stations under police supervision shortly before voting.

On 12 March, officials warned about fraudulent phone calls and messages in which scammers asked citizens to provide SMS verification codes allegedly to "register a ballot" or confirm participation in the referendum. Authorities emphasized that no such procedure exists and that voting would take place only at polling stations using paper ballots.

Separately, the Assembly of People of Kazakhstan denied messages circulating in messengers falsely claiming that a referendum would be held on Kazakhstan joining a Union State with Russia, stating that the information was fabricated and unrelated to the planned republican referendum.

On 13 March, the Center for Combating Disinformation under the Central Communications Service warned about possible disinformation circulating online during the day of silence and on referendum day in Kazakhstan, including staged videos, deepfakes, and other materials taken out of context intended to mislead the public.

== Conduct ==
Official logo of the 2026 referendum

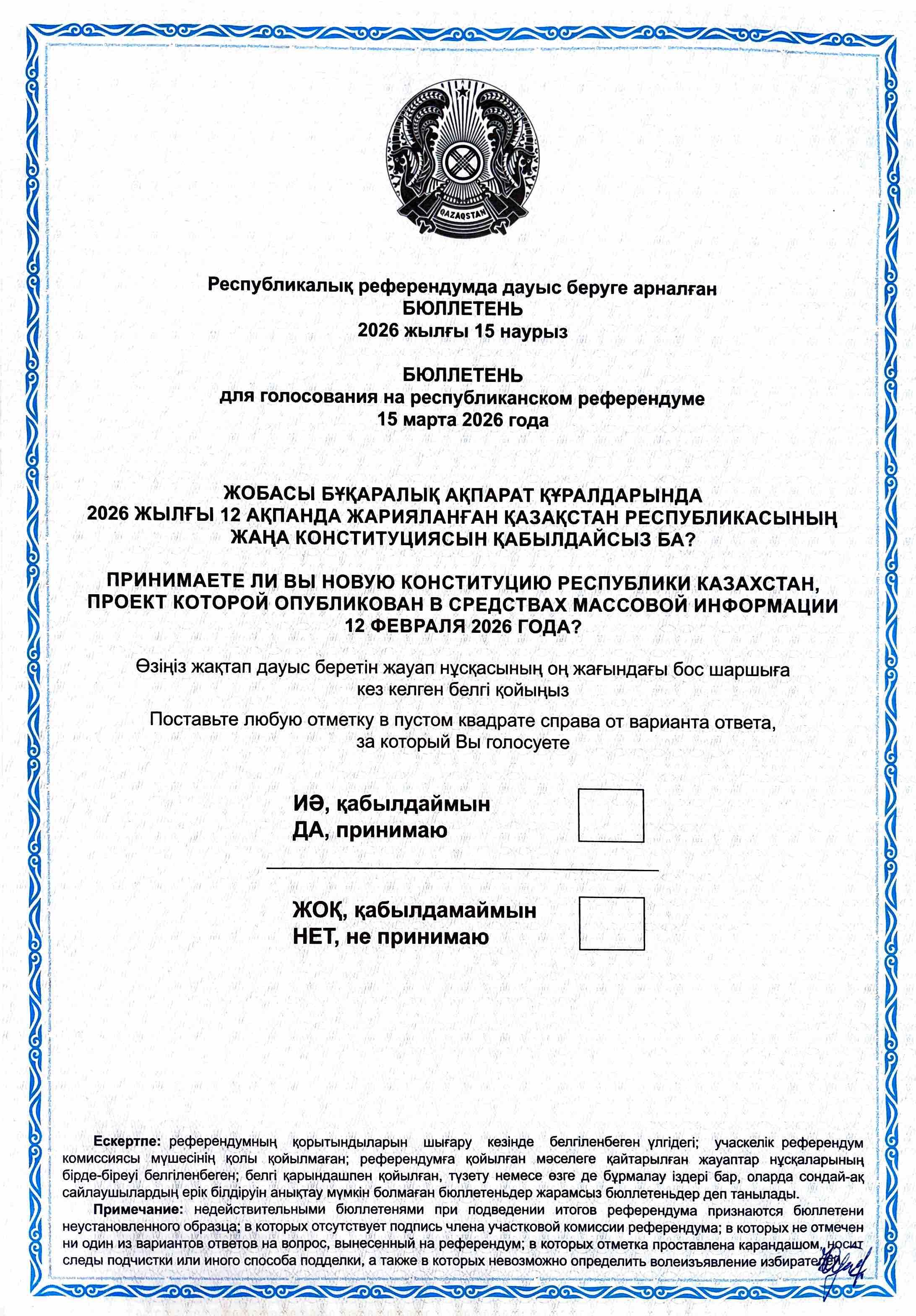
Voting ballot used in the referendum (written in both Kazakh and Russian)

Elections in Kazakhstan are prepared and conducted by various bodies of election commissions.

=== Preparations ===
On 12 February 2026, the ORK held a meeting to approve the calendar plan and organizational framework for the 15 March referendum. Preparations included training more than 71,000 territorial and precinct commission members, organizing accreditation of international observers and foreign media, distributing ballots and draft Constitution texts to polling stations, implementing accessibility measures for voters with disabilities, and establishing public information systems such as hotlines and media briefings to inform citizens about the referendum process.

A total of 10,413 polling stations were initially established for the 2026 referendum, including 9,779 at citizens' places of permanent registration and 634 in temporary locations, as well as 82 polling stations in 64 foreign countries. On 23 February 2026, the ORK revised the figures to 10,411 polling stations domestically and 80 abroad in 62 countries after excluding Ukraine and Ethiopia due to the international and geopolitical situation, including a significant decrease in the number of registered Kazakhstani citizens in those states. Voting will take place from 07:00 to 20:00 at regular polling stations, while 632 special polling stations—including those in military units, hospitals, sanatoriums, detention centres, and foreign missions—may close earlier once all registered voters have cast their ballots.

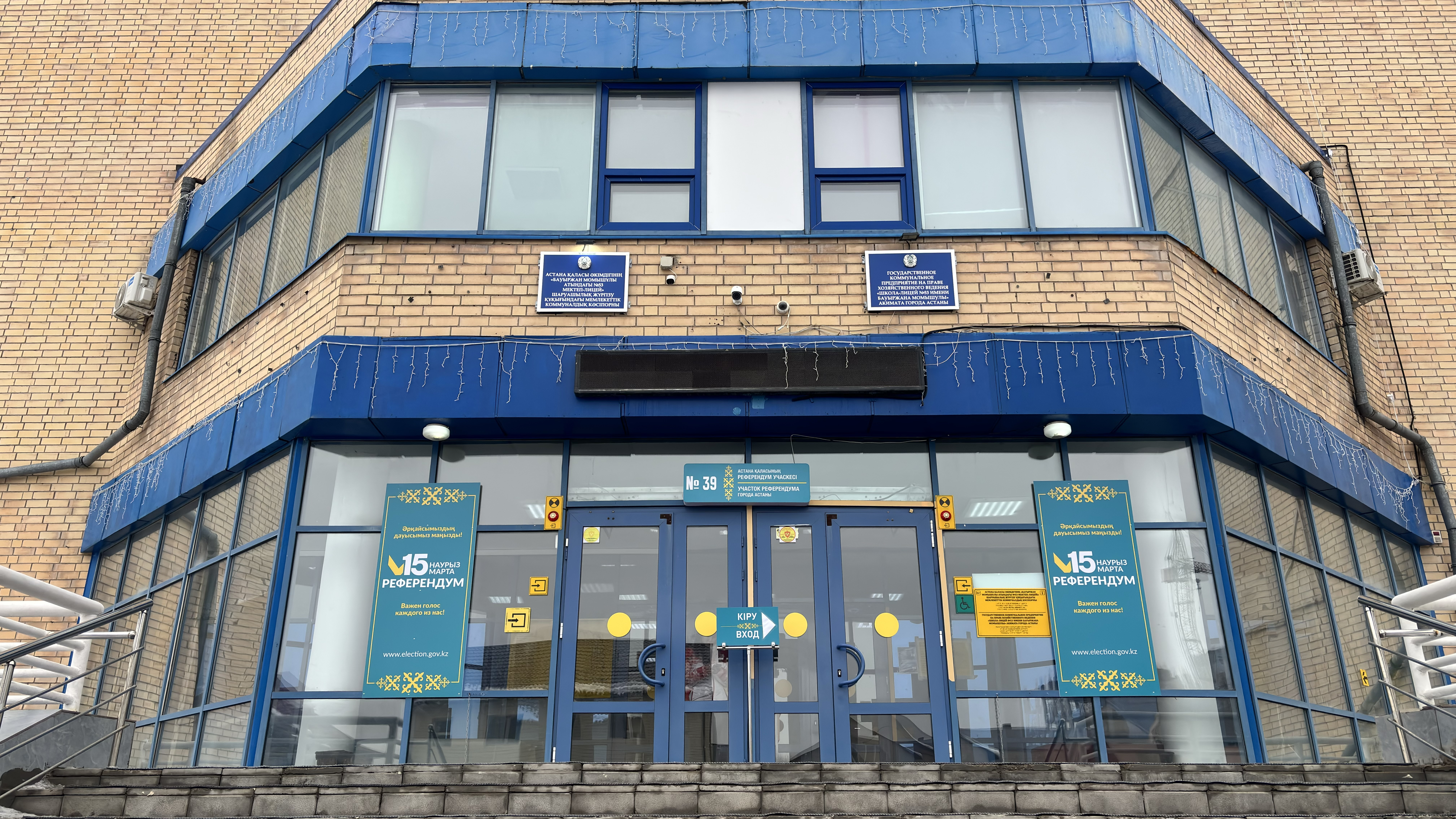
Entrance to Polling Station No. 39 at Lyceum School No. 53 in Astana

On 6 March 2026, the Ministry of Foreign Affairs announced that several overseas polling stations in the United Arab Emirates, Israel, Jordan, Iran, Qatar, Kuwait, Lebanon and Oman were temporarily closed due to the security situation in the Middle East, reducing the number of polling stations abroad to 71 in 54 countries. A total of 10,402 polling stations will operate across Kazakhstan on the day of the referendum.

In total, 12,586,413 electoral ballots were prepared, including a one-percent reserve as required by law. Beginning 15 days before the referendum, on 1 March 2026, voters in Kazakhstan could request absentee voting certificates at their local polling stations until 18:00 on 14 March; a total of 17,514 certificates were issued.

The ministries of Artificial Intelligence and Digital Development, together with Internal Affairs, launched two eGov portal services for voters to verify and update registration at polling stations, while precinct commissions supported outreach through QR-coded invitations, Telegram bots, and SMS notifications, with 5,066 polling stations enabling on-site updates and 220 providing temporary registration.

Government authorities also launched online services through the Gov.kz portal and eGov Mobile application allowing voters to verify their polling station using their Individual Identification Number.

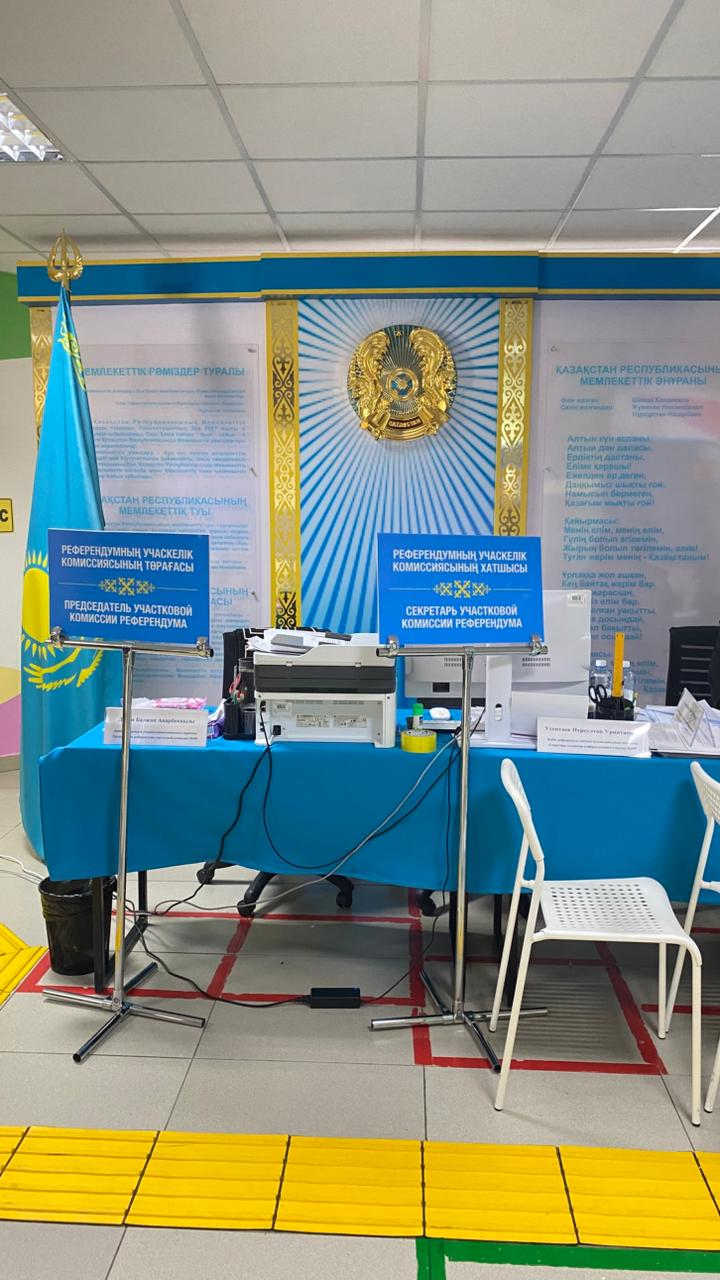
Temporarily-placed work tables and equipment of the polling agents of polling station No. 171, Astana, Kazakhstan

In early March 2026, ORK chairman Nurlan Äbdirov conducted inspection visits to polling stations and referendum commissions across 20 regions, including Almaty, Pavlodar Region, and the capital Astana, reviewing the material and technical readiness of the stations, the training of commission members, the issuance of absentee ballots, accessibility for voters with disabilities, and coordination with local executive and law enforcement authorities.

In the days before the referendum, Äbdirov noted potential weather-related turnout of heavy snow, frost, and icy roads issues in northern regions but confirmed that contingency plans, including road clearing, operational headquarters, and backup power, would ensure safe access to polling stations.

=== Voter registration ===
By 1 July and 1 January every year, information on voters and the boundaries of polling stations are submitted by the local executive bodies (akimats) in electronic form to their territorial election commissions, which ensure the verification and submission of information to the higher election commissions. At a briefing on 12 February 2026, member of the ORK Azamat Aimanakumov stated that 12,416,759 citizens were included in the voter list as of 1 January 2026.

For the 2026 referendum, voter registration and related procedures followed the deadlines set by the Chapter 4 of the Constitutional Law "On the Republican Referendum" and the associated electoral regulations. Akimats were responsible for compiling the voter lists at the place of residence, updating them to reflect recent migration or submitted applications, and submitting them to the precinct and territorial referendum commissions. Following the approval of commission compositions and precinct boundaries on 21 February 2026, voter lists had to be compiled and submitted by akim (local head) no later than 20 days before the vote (22 February 2026). From 15 days before the referendum (27 February 2026), citizens were able to review and verify their inclusion in the voter lists. Finally, precinct commissions were required to notify voters of the time and place of voting at least 10 days before the referendum (4 March 2026).

As of 23 February 2026, a total of 12,461,796 people were included on the voter register according to reports and information of representatives of the akimats of the regions, Astana, Almaty and Shymkent. On 10 March 2026, ambassador-at-large Erjan Alimbaev stated that 14,230 citizens of Kazakhstan were registered to vote abroad in the referendum.

=== Referendum spending ===
At a briefing on 12 February 2026, ORK member Mikhail Bortnik announced that the estimated cost of holding the 2026 referendum would amount to 20.8 billion tenge, with 75% allocated to salaries of polling station commission members, and noted that the funds would be drawn from the government reserve as they were not provided in the year 2026 republican budget. Vice Minister of Finance Dauren Temirbekov added that the total cost was expected to exceed the 15.5 billion tenge spent on the 2024 referendum, citing population growth and inflation as contributing factors.

On 19 February 2026, the Ministry of Finance of Kazakhstan announced that 20.7 billion tenge had been allocated from the government reserve for the republican referendum, including 20.6 billion tenge to the ORK—of which 15.6 billion (75%) was for remuneration of 71,044 commission members and 4.9 billion (25%) for organizational measures such as printing ballots and information support—along with an additional 123.6 million tenge for the Ministry of Foreign Affairs to service overseas polling stations, while reiterating that foreign or international financing of referendum-related activities is prohibited by law. On 23 February, Bortnik confirmed that the final approved budget amounted to approximately ₸20,778,515,000, confirming the previously announced allocations.

=== Online voting ===
At a meeting of the ORK on 12 February 2026, Vice Minister of Artificial Intelligence and Digital Development Rostislav Konyashkin stated that electronic voting was unlikely for the upcoming referendum due to the need for legislative amendments and broader legal, technical, and organizational reforms, emphasizing concerns over vote secrecy and the integrity of the electoral process. ORK chairman Nurlan Äbdirov added that paper ballots remain significantly cheaper than electronic voting and cited international examples, notably South Korea, where electronic voting is not used on the main election day despite technological availability.

=== Accessibility for disabled voters ===
On 19 February 2026, the ORK reported that polling stations for the republican referendum will include ramps, lifts, tactile signs, call buttons, and designated parking for voters with disabilities. Accessible corners will provide magnifiers, headphones, and special voting booths, with information materials available in audio and sign language formats. Braille stencils and audio bulletins will be provided for visually impaired voters, and electronic magnifiers, induction loops, and Braille site maps are being piloted in Aktobe Region and Pavlodar Region. Commission members also announced in conducting door-to-door visits to identify voters needing assistance.

At a subsequent meeting on 22 February, ORK chairman Nurlan Äbdirov stated that Braille stencils were being prepared for nationwide distribution under strict scrutiny by the Central Audit Committee, alongside plans to provide audio versions of the draft Constitution at polling stations, complete accessibility training for referendum commission members, and pilot electronic magnifiers and other assistive technologies in selected regions.

At the 23 February ORK meeting, members stated that implementation of accessibility measures was under monitoring, including cooperation with non-governmental organisations, while regional authorities reported that polling stations had been technically equipped, voter lists compiled, call centres and Telegram bots activated, and services such as Invataxi and sign language interpretation organised to facilitate participation.

=== Referendum day ===
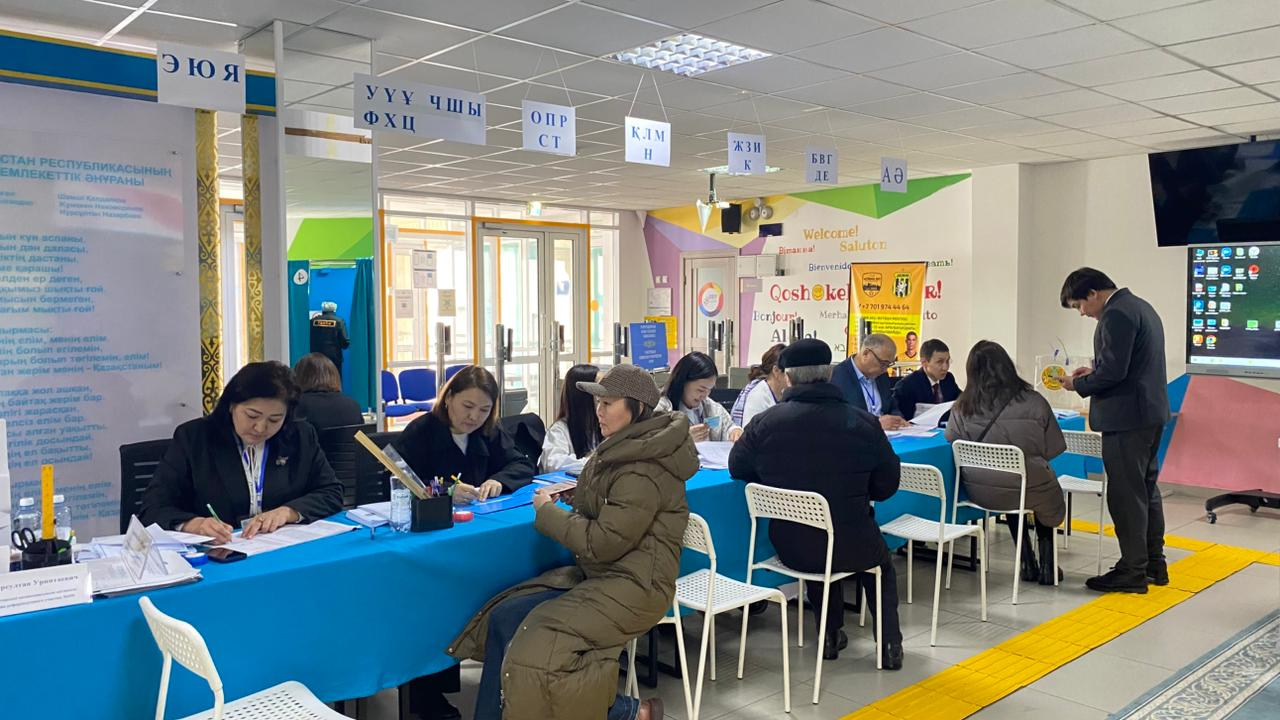
People voting at the referendum, 171th polling station, Astana, Kazakhstan

Voting in the referendum began on 15 March 2026, with 10,388 polling stations opening at 07:00 local time and 92 polling stations—primarily at military units—opening earlier at 06:00. In several cities across Kazakhstan, public transportation was made free on the day of voting to facilitate access to polling locations.

The ORK reported the first turnout figures at 10:00 local time, showing 19.2% (2,393,844 votes) nationwide. By 14:00, turnout had reached 51.9% (6,471,378 votes), surpassing the 50% threshold required for the referendum results to be valid under the law.

Several senior Kazakh officials publicly cast their ballots during the day, including president Kassym-Jomart Tokayev and former president Nursultan Nazarbayev. After voting at a polling station in Astana, Tokayev told journalists that the proposed constitution represented a "future-oriented document" intended to support the country's modernization.

As of 19:00, the ORK reported that 9,050 Kazakh citizens had voted at overseas polling stations. By 20:00 local time, when polls closed in Kazakhstan, preliminary turnout was reported at 73.24% nationwide, with 9,126,850 citizens casting ballots out of those included on the voter lists. Due to time zone differences, voting at polling stations abroad continued until 08:00 Astana Time; according to the Ministry of Foreign Affairs, a total of 12,740 citizens voted at stations in 54 countries, representing a turnout of 88.6%.

==== Detentions and observer incidents ====
On referendum day, several journalists and election observers reported detentions and restricted access at polling stations in Astana and Almaty. Radio Free Europe/Radio Liberty correspondent Joldas Orisbai and two other journalists, including Saniya Toiken from Informburo, were briefly detained by police at the Schoolchildren's Palace in Astana before being released without charges. Another journalist, Darhan Omirbek, was removed from a polling station during the vote count after the commission cited a missing seal on his editorial assignment, which he noted was optional. Observers from the League of Young Voters and Erkindik Qanaty were also removed from polling stations for documenting alleged irregularities, including voters added to lists without identification or filming during observation. In one case at Polling Station No. 85 in Astana, an observer from the League of Young Voters was forcibly dragged out by four people wearing medical masks after turning on a video camera and was later able to retrieve his belongings under threat to his personal safety. Observers from the Muqalmas association also reported being denied entry to polling stations No. 46 and No. 63 in Astana, where precinct commissions cited a lack of available seating despite one observer arriving before voting began. Other incidents included observers threatened with removal for taking photographs, being asked to leave due to floor cleaning, or questioned for alleged involvement with banned political movements such as the Democratic Choice of Kazakhstan.

In Almaty, police detained three individuals at Astana Square, including former political prisoners Almat Jumagulov and Oralbek Omyrov, as well as activist Suyundyq Aldabergenov, who were taken to a police station in the Almaly District. Local media reported increased police presence around Astana Square, where police vehicles and prisoner transport vans were stationed and a mobile internet-blocking vehicle was observed, with officers stating they were present to "guard the silence" following calls by exiled opposition figure Mukhtar Ablyazov for supporters to gather.

Despite these incidents, the Prosecutor General's Office stated that the referendum was conducted in stable conditions and that no significant violations were recorded by referendum commissions, with only one citizen fined for illegal polling and campaigning.

== Observation ==
On 12 February 2026, the Central Referendum Commission (ORK) announced the invitation of international observers from foreign states and organizations to monitor the referendum on the adoption of the new Constitution, with accreditation managed through the Ministry of Foreign Affairs. Deputy chairman of the ORK, Muqtar Erman, stated that invitations were sent to more than 30 countries across Europe, America, Asia, and the CIS region, and that the Ministry of Foreign Affairs would also invite major international organizations.

An independent Information Headquarters of Referendum Observers, comprising civil society representatives, experts, and human rights defenders, was formed on 3 March 2026 in Almaty to monitor the referendum transparently, collect real-time reports from polling stations via a situation room on voting day, and provide updates, expert analysis, and live commentary to the public through its website.

On 10 March 2026, the ORK announced that 359 international observers from 38 countries and 11 organizations had been accredited to monitor the referendum, including missions from the Commonwealth of Independent States, the OSCE Office for Democratic Institutions and Human Rights, the Shanghai Cooperation Organisation, the Organization of Turkic States, the Turkic Parliamentary Assembly, the CSTO Parliamentary Assembly, and the Organisation of Islamic Cooperation. In addition, representatives of the central election authorities of 15 states participated as observers, including the chairpersons of the central election commissions of Azerbaijan, Albania, Armenia, Kyrgyzstan, Russia, Uzbekistan, Tajikistan, and Turkey.

=== OSCE ===
On 4 February 2026, during a meeting with representatives of the OSCE Office for Democratic Institutions and Human Rights (ODIHR), Kazakh authorities expressed their readiness to discuss the possible deployment of an election observation mission to monitor the referendum following consultations with election officials, with ODIHR director Maria Telalian indicated the organization's willingness to consider sending an observation mission following the findings of the assessment team.

The ODIHR conducted a Needs Assessment Mission (NAM) led by deputy head Ulvi Akhundlu and election advisor Elena Kovaleva in a visit to Kazakhstan from 17 to 20 February 2026 to evaluate the pre-referendum environment and preparations. On 19 February 2026, deputy chairman of the Central Referendum Commission (ORK) Muqtar Erman met with representatives of the OSCE/ODIHR mission in Astana, including Akhundlu and Kovaleva, to discuss needs for an observation mission. Erman briefed them on polling station preparations, voter registration, accessibility measures, and conditions for accredited organizations and media, while OSCE/ODIHR representatives discussed prospects for an observation mission. On 3 March 2026, ORK chairman Nurlan Abdirov met with ODIHR RAM head Douglas Bruce Wake to discuss preparations for the vote, including accessibility measures, digital voter services, and the accreditation of observers from several states and international organizations.

== Opinion polls ==
As of 22 February 2026, the Central Referendum Commission named seven organizations authorized to conduct public opinion and exit polls during the referendum campaign which included the Institute of Democracy, the Public Opinion Research Institute, DATAmetrics, the Institute of Public Policy of the Amanat Party, the Institute of Eurasian Integration, the Kazakhstan Institute of Public Development, and the Institute for Comprehensive Social Research – Astana (SOCIS-A), all of which met the legal requirement of at least five years of polling experience.

In reporting for Radio Free Europe/Radio Liberty, journalist Joldas Örisbai noted several authorized institutes conducting public opinion polling ahead of the 2026 referendum, raising questions about their methodological transparency and survey questions sometimes framed in ways that could intentionally encourage positive responses.

Fieldwork date	Sample size	Polling firm	For	Against	Don't know	Lead
16 Feb–4 Mar 2026	8,000	Institute for Democracy	90.9	4.6	4.5	86.3
12–20 Feb 2026	1,200	Kazakhstan Institute of Public Development	89.2	—	10.8	—
14–18 Feb 2026	1,200	Public Opinion	78.8	—	22.5	—
9–18 Feb 2026	8,000	Institute of Public Policy of the Amanat Party	86.5	—	—	—
12 Feb 2026	Final draft of the new Constitution published and submitted to the referendum					
1–5 Feb 2026	1,200	Institute for Democracy	84.7	13.5	—	71.2
24–28 Jan 2026	1,200	Public Opinion	78.4	18.8	2.9	59.6
21 Jan 2026	Preliminary draft of the new Constitution released for public discussion					

=== Exit polls ===
On referendum day, several organizations conducted exit polls across Kazakhstan, where interviewers anonymously asked voters a single question about how they had voted in order to produce preliminary estimates of voting trends.

Around midnight on 16 March 2026, Kazakh media outlets began reporting exit polls showing overwhelming support for the proposed constitutional changes among surveyed voters.

Polling firm	Sample size	For	Against	Turnout
Eurasian Institute for Integration	30,000	86.7	13.3	—
SOCIS-A	24,000	87.4	12.6	73.8
Institute of Public Policy of the Amanat Party	24,000	88.6	11.4	72.1

== Results ==
At 08:00 UTC+5 on 16 March 2026, the Central Referendum Commission (ORK) announced preliminary results, stating that the referendum was officially recognized as "held". Turnout was reported at 9,127,197 voters (72.1%), the highest for a nationwide vote since the 2019 presidential election. Of those who voted, 89.9% (7,954,667 votes) supported the adoption of the new constitution, while 10.1% (898,099 votes) voted against. Turnout in Almaty was the lowest among regions at 33.4%, although it exceeded levels recorded in republican referendums since 2020.

On 17 March 2026, the ORK confirmed the final results at a commission meeting, issuing Resolution No. 12/24 "On the results of the voting in the republican referendum of 15 March 2026", thereby confirming the adoption of the constitution.

Choice	Votes	%
For	7,954,667	89.86
Against	898,099	10.14
Total	8,852,766	100.00
Valid votes	8,852,766	98.37
Invalid/blank votes	146,558	1.63
Total votes	8,999,324	100.00
Registered voters/turnout	12,482,613	72.09
Source: ORK

2026 Kazakh constitutional referendum result (excluding invalid votes)
Yes: 7,954,667 (89.86%)	No: 898,099 (10.14%)
▲

=== Results by region ===
"Yes" vote margin by region: +95% 90–95% 85–90% 80–85% 75–80% -75%

"No" vote margin by region: +25% 20–25% 15–20% 10–15% -10%

Results of the 2026 constitutional referendum by region
Region	Electorate	Turnout (%)	For		Against		Invalid	Total
Region	Electorate	Turnout (%)	Votes	%	Votes	%	Invalid	Total
Abai Region	400,830	75.29%	253,571	86.23%	40,484	13.77%	3,621	297,676
Aqmola Region	511,813	79.69%	349,283	87.74%	48,822	12.26%	4,649	402,754
Aqtöbe Region	577,850	86.87%	471,661	97.19%	13,659	2.81%	9,437	494,757
Almaty Region	1,030,876	71.35%	591,412	82.83%	122,616	17.17%	10,911	724,939
Atyrau Region	417,426	73.85%	242,938	81.64%	54,652	18.36%	5,825	303,415
West Kazakhstan Region	446,999	68.78%	250,311	83.87%	48,146	16.13%	4,797	303,254
Jambyl Region	722,594	84.93%	569,074	95.14%	29,041	4.86%	8,100	606,215
Jetisu Region	438,381	78.33%	309,572	92.79%	24,047	7.21%	5,253	338,872
Qarağandy Region	758,931	84.12%	535,127	86.51%	83,463	13.49%	11,300	629,890
Qostanai Region	537,586	81.08%	391,148	92.44%	31,981	7.56%	6,624	429,753
Qyzylorda Region	493,155	92.89%	412,126	91.89%	36,364	8.11%	4,946	453,436
Mangystau Region	444,875	77.67%	322,732	97.20%	9,303	2.80%	7,844	339,879
Pavlodar Region	499,411	75.32%	354,138	96.83%	11,588	3.17%	5,565	371,291
North Kazakhstan Region	365,390	70.38%	213,722	85.85%	35,214	14.15%	4,037	252,973
Türkistan Region	1,189,002	83.87%	919,617	94.40%	54,571	5.60%	12,266	986,454
Ulytau Region	136,795	72.88%	83,475	86.53%	12,992	13.47%	1,614	98,081
East Kazakhstan Region	485,899	86.25%	383,526	94.34%	23,020	5.66%	6,621	413,167
Astana	1,012,840	60.75%	531,149	90.07%	58,576	9.93%	14,274	603,999
Almaty	1,314,844	33.30%	312,437	74.71%	105,757	25.29%	10,816	429,010
Shymkent	697,116	75.56%	457,648	89.48%	53,803	10.52%	8,058	519,509
Kazakhstan	12,482,613	73.12%	7,954,667	89.86%	898,099	10.14%	146,558	8,999,324

=== Voter turnout ===
Region	Time					
Region	10:00	12:00	14:00	16:00	18:00	20:00
Kazakhstan	1,710,381 (19.21%)	4,677,595 (37.54%)	6,471,378 (51.93%)	8,029,286 (64.43%)	8,845,280 (70.98%)	9,126,850 (73.24%)
Abai Region	19.98%	41.93%	61.04%	69.29%	73.84%	75.45%
Akmola Region	19.82%	44.66%	60.05%	71.33%	77.72%	79.82%
Aktobe Region	21.80%	45.73%	61.37%	77.65%	83.12%	87.05%
Almaty Region	18.10%	40.41%	56.13%	68.23%	70.27%	71.46%
Atyrau Region	19.44%	42.29%	56.54%	64.33%	71.08%	74.04%
West Kazakhstan Region	18.80%	36.59%	49.97%	60.61%	66.90%	68.94%
Jambyl Region	18.49%	35.86%	51.13%	70.31%	81.07%	85.06%
Jetisu Region	21.01%	43.32%	59.82%	72.63%	73.84%	78.49%
Karaganda Region	26.64%	42.95%	57.32%	72.63%	81.44%	84.30%
Kostanay Region	19.24%	37.10%	56.51%	70.96%	80.11%	81.21%
Kyzylorda Region	24.02%	43.18%	64.63%	82.02%	91.80%	93.04%
Mangystau Region	18.53%	34.57%	53.14%	68.19%	76.84%	77.89%
Pavlodar Region	16.36%	36.57%	53.31%	68.41%	71.85%	75.51%
North Kazakhstan Region	18.72%	41.64%	52.37%	60.70%	68.58%	70.52%
Turkistan Region	21.21%	44.13%	58.03%	72.39%	82.03%	84.03%
Ulytau Region	20.31%	36.59%	52.06%	66.50%	70.57%	73.15%
East Kazakhstan Region	20.64%	42.88%	59.60%	78.98%	83.63%	86.42%
Astana	20.68%	31.23%	40.68%	47.76%	56.72%	60.36%
Almaty	9.54%	14.85%	21.68%	28.16%	32.82%	33.43%
Shymkent	21.36%	42.49%	58.24%	72.61%	74.44%	75.82%

=== Observer reports and voting protocol discrepancies ===
Independent observers reported mixed results at the polling station level during the 2026 constitutional referendum, raising questions about the accuracy of the official figures. In Oral, NGOs Zhariya and Abyroi monitored 65 polling stations and recorded a voter turnout of 43%, below the 50% threshold required for the referendum to be legally valid. Observers noted varying voting protocol results across stations, including polling stations of No. 515 (49.3% in favor, 50.7% against), No. 349 (68.6% in favor, 31.4% against), and No. 415 (turnout of 90%, split 50–50). Coordinators Hakim Mendybay and Samal Gilmanova suggested that the official turnout figures may had overstated participation and indicated plans for legal challenges.

In Almaty and Oral, observers also reported mixed outcomes. At some polling stations, the majority voted against the draft constitution—for instance, journalist Ardaq Boqeeva observed 230 votes in favor and 369 against at one Almaty polling station. Other polling stations showed support for the amendments, including Polling Station No. 642 in Nauryzbay District of Almaty, where 405 voted in favor and 221 against, according to early vote-count protocols. At Polling Station No. 232 in Almaty, BES.media reported that early counts showed 210 votes in favor and 272 against, but a subsequent recount recorded 203 in favor and 279 against, prompting observers to file an act of violation due to discrepancies between protocols and sealed ballots.

== Aftermath ==
=== Reactions ===
Political analysts offered mixed assessments of the referendum. Political scientist Dosym Satpaev described the results as a "pyrrhic victory" for the Kazakh government, arguing that extensive state resources spent on promoting the "yes" campaign produced high approval but reinforced an illusion of consensus, weakened feedback between authorities and citizens, and fostered cynicism and a "culture of imitation". He warned that overemphasis on controlling political opponents could erode support among neutral citizens, whose loyalty traditionally sustains government stability. Temur Umarov of the Carnegie Berlin Center noted that President Tokayev already held extensive powers and controlled parliament, and that the new constitution primarily "brings political reality closer to legal reality", while following the 2022 "de-Nazarbayevization" of the 1995 Constitution and potentially allowing flexibility in interpreting presidential term limits. Umarov also suggested the referendum could provide Tokayev a legal loophole to reset term limits, while reflecting a trend toward ostentatious "traditionalism" in Kazakh politics and the absence of a structured opposition. Analyst Daria Zielińska of the Centre for Eastern Studies argued that the constitutional reform initiated by Tokayev expanded presidential appointment powers and reinstated the vice-presidency primarily to facilitate elite continuity and manage the 2029 succession while presenting a "façade of democratization". Mario Bikarski, senior analyst at Verisk Maplecroft, argued that the shift to a unicameral parliament expands presidential powers without addressing public demands for accountability, and emphasized that preventing a repeat of the 2022 unrest remains a key concern given Kazakhstan's high risk of civil unrest, particularly in industrial and oil-producing regions. Political analyst Serik Beysembaev argued in Carnegie Russia Eurasia Center that the constitutional changes primarily reflected efforts by Tokayev and the ruling elite to manage succession and preserve political stability while strengthening executive authority at the expense of institutional checks and civil liberties.

Civil society perspectives were similarly mixed. Bigeldy Gabdullin, head of the Kazakh PEN Club and former journalist imprisoned under Nursultan Nazarbayev, welcomed the reforms as creating a "Second Republic", highlighting the strict seven-year single presidential term, the weakening of the cult of personality, and the renewed accessibility of the Constitutional Court for ordinary citizens. In contrast, Aidar Alibayev, socio-political commentator and former member of the Nationwide Social Democratic Party, criticized broad principles such as "Law and Order" and "justice" and expressed concern that the appointed vice presidency could allow a vice president to consolidate power before elections, potentially destabilizing governance.

International observers emphasized the strategic and diplomatic dimensions of the reforms. Kate Mallison of Chatham House noted that the constitutional changes consolidate presidential power while creating multiple succession scenarios ahead of the end of Tokayev's term in 2029, including the possibility of extending his term or assuming a vice presidential role, likely securing support from domestic and international actors, particularly Russia and China. She also highlighted that the reforms reinforce Kazakhstan's sovereignty and the primacy of the Kazakh language.

Media and journalistic commentary focused on political centralization and regime stability. Daniil Kislov, founder of the Ferghana Information Agency, argued that the new constitution primarily consolidates Tokayev's authority, formalizes elite and bureaucratic structures, manages succession, and establishes legal mechanisms to preempt dissent, emphasizing national identity and regime stability rather than democratization or citizen empowerment. Kamila Auyezova wrote in International Policy Digest that the 2026 referendum represents a deliberate effort to modernize and recalibrate state institutions, seeking public legitimacy and stability, while its ultimate impact will depend on how effectively the reforms are implemented rather than on the vote itself. Political analyst Iskander Akylbayev from Anadolu Agency argued that the new constitution represents a strategic redesign of state institutions intended to strengthen governance capacity and institutional continuity while adapting Kazakhstan's political system to its role as a middle power in a changing Eurasian geopolitical environment, and described the referendum as reflecting public demand for stability and administrative coherence rather than ideological transformation.

==== Domestic ====
After the publication of exit polls, president Kassym-Jomart Tokayev delivered a statement at the Kazmedia Center, describing the referendum as a "historic day", thanking citizens for participating, and stating that the vote demonstrated national unity and support for Kazakhstan's future development.

After voting, former president Nursultan Nazarbayev publicly expressed support for the referendum and Tokayev's policies, stating that the draft constitution should serve the interests of Kazakhstan and its people.

==== International ====
Following the referendum, President Tokayev received congratulatory messages from several foreign leaders and international organizations.

Russian president Vladimir Putin stated that the constitutional reforms would strengthen bilateral relations and described the results as evidence of broad public support for institutional development and socio-economic reforms. Uzbek president Shavkat Mirziyoyev expressed confidence that the changes would contribute to Kazakhstan's development and international standing.

Additional messages of support were sent by Kyrgyz president Sadyr Japarov, Azerbaijani president Ilham Aliyev, Belarusian president Alexander Lukashenko, Pakistani prime minister Shehbaz Sharif, French president Emmanuel Macron, Israeli president Isaac Herzog, Turkish president Recep Tayyip Erdoğan, Serbian president Aleksandar Vučić, and Armenian prime minister Nikol Pashinyan, who noted the significance of the vote and expressed support for Kazakhstan's reform efforts. The Ministry of Foreign Affairs of Turkey also welcomed the referendum, stating that it had taken place in a "peaceful and calm" atmosphere and expressing hope that the adopted constitutional amendments would be beneficial for Kazakhstan. Congratulatory statements were also issued by representatives of international organizations, including the Commonwealth of Independent States, the Shanghai Cooperation Organisation, the Collective Security Treaty Organization, the Organization of Turkic States, the Eurasian Economic Commission, and the Economic Cooperation Organization.

=== Implementation ===
On 17 March 2026, Tokayev took part in a ceremonial event at the Akorda Residence marking the adoption of the new constitution. During the event, attended by senior government officials and members of the Constitutional Commission, Central Referendum Commission chairman Nurlan Äbdirov announced the final results of the referendum. Tokayev signed the new constitution into law, calling it a "strategic document" and "symbol of national unity" that reflects citizens' hopes, announced measures for its implementation including amnesty for certain offenses, and declared that it will take effect on 1 July 2026 with 15 March to be observed annually as Constitution Day. Later that same day, Tokayev chaired a working meeting to oversee implementation of the new constitution and instructed the government and parliament to harmonize existing laws and adopt the necessary constitutional and legislative amendments ahead of the constitution taking effect.

On 20 March 2026, the Parliament of Kazakhstan held its first joint session following the referendum and began legislative codification of the new constitutional framework, during which deputies approved in the first reading a draft law establishing the special status of the new city of Alatau. The outgoing 8th convocation of the Parliament of Kazakhstan is expected to complete adoption of these implementation laws before the constitution takes effect, after which the legislature will be dissolved as part of the transition to the new institutional structure centered on the Kurultai, with elections scheduled prior to the opening session of the first Kurultai on 1 September 2026.

On 7 July 2026, following a request submitted by Tokayev, the Constitutional Court of Kazakhstan issued a normative resolution interpreting the new constitution's transitional provisions, ruling that terms of office held under the 1995 Constitution would not count toward restrictions established by the 2026 constitutional order, allowing Tokayev to potentially seek another seven-year term in 2029.

== See also ==
- Constitution Day (Kazakhstan)
