= Amendments to the Constitution of Kazakhstan =

Amendments to the 1995 Constitution of the Republic of Kazakhstan, adopted by republican referendum on 30 August 1995, have been enacted several times since independence. Since 1995, six major packages of constitutional amendments have been adopted: 1998, 2007, 2011, 2017, 2019, and 2022.

These changes reflected the political development of Kazakhstan: in the late 1990s and 2000s, the amendments were used to strengthen the presidential power of Nursultan Nazarbayev, while later reforms under Kassym-Jomart Tokayev were framed as redistributing authority and modernizing the state.

== Background ==
The 1995 Constitution of Kazakhstan replaced the 1993 Constitution and established a strong presidential model. According to Article 91, changes to the Constitution may be introduced either by a two-thirds majority of both chambers of Parliament with assent of the President, or by national referendum called by the President.

Certain clauses such as those on independence, territorial integrity, and the unitary character of the state cannot be amended.

== Summary of amendments ==
Year	No.	Article(s) affected	Main provisions	Method of adoption	Effective date
1998	284	Amend articles 33, 41, 42, 44, 48, 49, 50, 51, 52, 56, 57, 66, 68, 82, 87, 91, 94, 95; Insert articles 75	Extended presidential term from 5 to 7 years; lowered minimum age for presidential candidates; clarified bicameral Parliament powers; strengthened executive over legislature	Parliamentary approval	7 October 1998
2007	254	Amend articles 41, 42, 46, 47, 50, 51, 52, 53, 57, 61, 65–70, 71–82, 83–87, 91; Insert articles 94-1	Reduced presidential term back to 5 years (exception for Nursultan Nazarbayev); expanded Mäjilis; Assembly of People of Kazakhstan gains 9 seats; formalized dominance of ruling party Nur Otan	Parliamentary approval	21 May 2007
2011	403-IV	Insert article 41(3-1)	Allowed early presidential election in 2011; reinforced incumbent advantage	Parliamentary approval	2 February 2011
2017	51-VI	Amend articles 4(3), 10(2), 39(2), 39(3), 41(2), 44(3), 44(18), 45(2), 49(1), 57(6), 61(2), 64(2), 66(1), 70(1), 72(2), 74(2), 79(3), 81, 83(1), 86(5), 87(4, 2nd sentence); Insert articles 2(3-1), 44(10-1), 53(1-1), 66(9-1); Remove articles 44(8, 9), 45(2), 53(3), 66(8), 73(4)	Constitutional modernization: transferred some powers from president to Parliament and Government; approval of ministers and law initiative shifted slightly; presidency remains dominant	Parliamentary approval	10 March 2017
2019	238-VІ	Amend article 2(3,3-1)	Rename the capital from Astana to Nur-Sultan in honor of outgoing president Nursultan Nazarbayev	Parliamentary approval	23 March 2019
2022 (June)	—	Amend articles 4, 6, 15, 23, 24, 44, 47, 50, 51, 52, 54, 55, 57, 58, 62, 71, 73, 74, 78, 82, 83, 87, 88, 91; Insert articles 43(3,4), 53(1-1,1-2), 56(3-1), 72(3-5), 83-1, 99; Remove articles 42(5, part excluded), 46(4 excluded), 61(5-1 excluded)	Removed Nazarbayev's status as Leader of the Nation (Elbasy); barred close relatives of president from senior offices; strengthened Parliament; restored Constitutional Court	National referendum	8 June 2022
2022 (Sept)	142-VII	Amend articles 2(3, 3-1), 41, 42, 71, 91(2); Insert article 94-2	Renaming of Nur-Sultan back to Astana; presidential term changed from 5-year renewable to 7-year single term	Parliamentary approval	17 September 2022

== Amendments by year ==
=== 1998 ===
The 1998 amendments, adopted by Parliament and signed by President Nursultan Nazarbayev on 7 October 1998, introduced changes to 19 articles of the Constitution. Among the key reforms was the removal of the upper age limit of 65 for the president and an increase in the presidential term from five to seven years. The amendments also abolished the age limit of 60 years old for civil servants. The presidential succession procedure was adjusted, so that the chairman of the Mäjilis (the lower house of parliament) was added before the Prime Minister and after the chairman of the Senate in the line of succession. Additionally, the Mäjilis lost its exclusive right to call early presidential elections. Most notably, the procedure for electing deputies of Parliament was altered: election to the Mäjilis became possible only through party lists, eliminating self-nomination, while the right of self-nomination was preserved only at the local mäslihat level. The 1998 amendments also put the president fully in charge of appointing or dismissing the largest akims (governmental heads), including the akims of Astana, Almaty, and at the oblast level; in addition, the president was given the authority to oversee the appointment of lower-level akimats, such as municipalities.

Constitutional experts such as Akif Suleymanov and Mereke Gabdualiev have observed that this reform limited citizens' passive suffrage rights.

=== 2007 ===
The 2007 amendments were adopted by Parliament on 21 May 2007, introducing 30 changes to the Constitution. The presidential term was reduced from seven to five years, but the First President (Elbasy) was exempted from term limits. A proportional representation system was established with the aim of fostering political competition. The Mäjilis was expanded to 107 deputies, of whom 98 were elected by party lists, while the remainder represented the Assembly of Peoples of Kazakhstan, which received constitutional recognition. Although these reforms introduced formal structures for political pluralism, power remained strongly concentrated in the presidency.

=== 2011 ===
Adopted on 2 February 2011, the amendments allowed for early presidential elections, providing a constitutional mechanism for the incumbent president to renew his mandate. Earlier proposals for a referendum that would have extended Nazarbayev's president's term until 2020 were considered and adopted but rejected by the Constitutional Council. These amendments reinforced presidential continuity while maintaining the president's dominant position within the political system.

=== 2017 ===
The 2017 constitutional amendments, described as part of the "constitutional modernization" initiative, were proposed on 25 January 2017 and adopted by the Parliament on 6 March 2017, entering into force on 10 March 2017.

The main objectives of these changes were to rebalance powers among state institutions and reduce the potential for concentration in the presidency. Some presidential powers were transferred to Parliament, including the approval of ministerial appointments and the initiation of legislation. The president was no longer able to object to decisions of the Constitutional Council, which is responsible for interpreting the Constitution, overseeing elections, and supervising referenda. Powers were redistributed among multiple institutions, creating a "collective succession" mechanism intended to ensure that presidential decisions reflected the interests of broader political forces. Additionally, a special legal regime was introduced for the financial sector within the capital of Astana. These reforms were presented as constitutional modernization while maintaining presidential oversight.

=== 2019 ===
The 2019 amendments to the Constitution of Kazakhstan were adopted by Parliament on 23 March 2019 and came into force the same day. The main change was renaming the capital from Astana to Nur-Sultan in honor of outgoing President Nursultan Nazarbayev. This amendment followed Nazarbayev's resignation on 19 March and occurred during a period of political transition.

=== 2022 ===
Following nationwide unrest in January 2022, President Kassym-Jomart Tokayev proposed broad constitutional reforms under the "New Kazakhstan" initiative. The proposals were approved in a national referendum on 5 June 2022, officially came into force on 8 June 2022. Key changes included abolishing the special constitutional status of the former First President (Elbasy), prohibiting close relatives of the president from holding senior state positions, and restoring the Constitutional Court while strengthening parliamentary powers.

Later amendments in September 2022 included renaming the capital back from Nur-Sultan to Astana and changing the presidential term from renewable five-year terms to a single seven-year term.

These reforms marked a significant reduction of the "super-presidential system" and dismantled entrenched privileges from the Nazarbayev era.

== See also ==
- Constitution of Kazakhstan
- Politics of Kazakhstan
