= Ertis =

Ertis may refer to:

- Ertis (river), Kazakh name for the Irtysh
- Ertis, Pavlodar Region, a village in Kazakhstan
- Ertis District, a subdivision of Kazakhstan
