= Panfilov, Pavlodar Region =

Panfilov Панфилов
- Location in Kazakhstan
- Coordinates: 53°14′37″N 74°53′56″E
- Country: Kazakhstan
- Region: Pavlodar Region
- District: Ertis District

Population (2009)
  - Total: 781
- Time zone: UTC+6 (UTC+6)
- Climate: Dfb

Panfilov (Kazakh: Панфилов, Panfilov, Russian: Панфилово, Panfilovo) is a selo in Ertis District in Pavlodar Region of northern Kazakhstan. Population: 781 (2009 census results); 1,348 (1999 census results)..

== Notable people ==
- Herman Gref (born 1964), politician and businessman
