= German Gref =

Russian economist (born 1964)

- Герман Греф
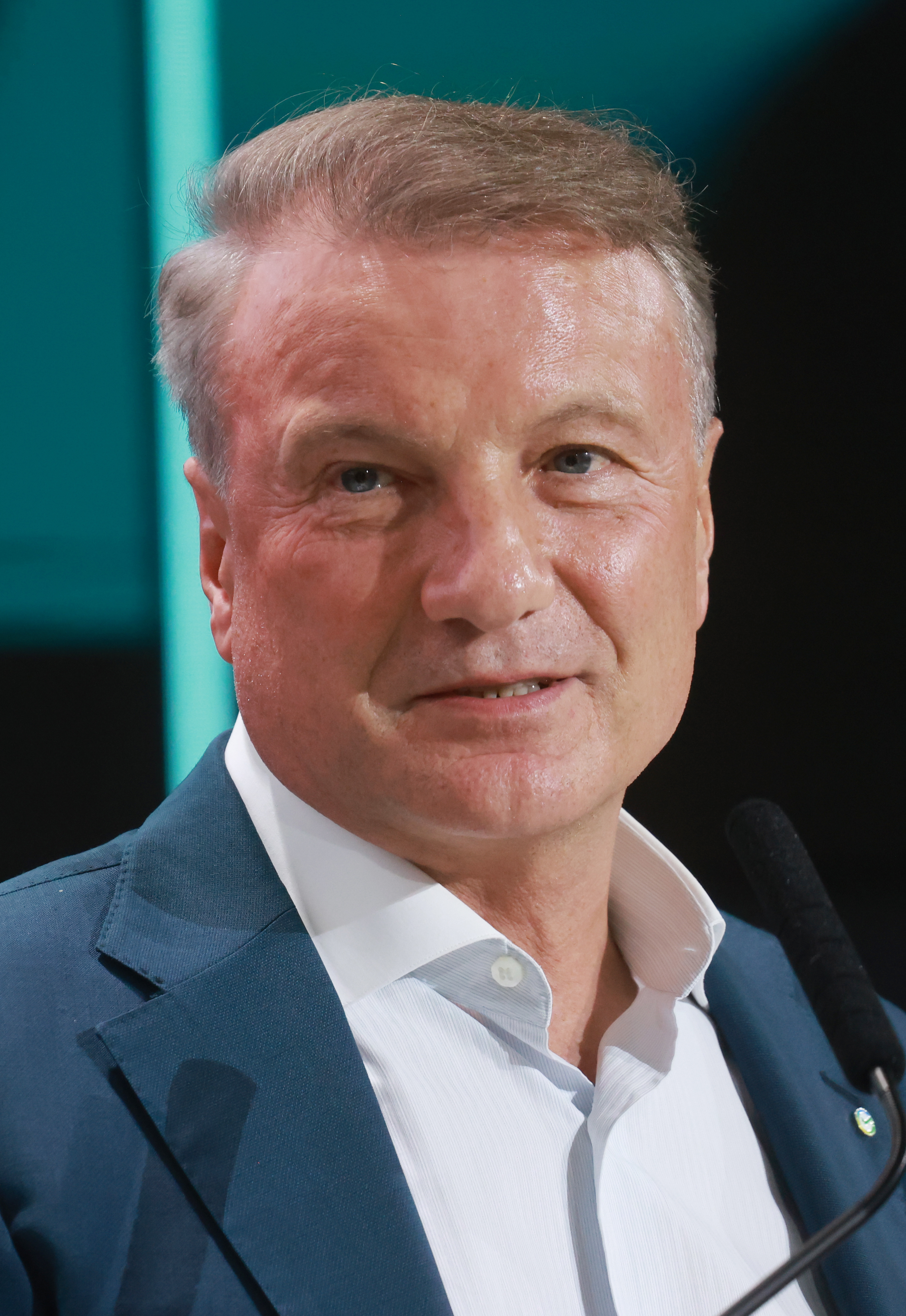
- Gref in 2023

Chairman and CEO of Sberbank
- Incumbent
- Assumed office November 2007
- Preceded by: Andrey Kazmin

Minister of Economic Development and Trade
- In office 18 May 2000 – 21 September 2007
- Prime Minister: Mikhail Kasyanov; Viktor Khristenko (acting); Mikhail Fradkov; Viktor Zubkov
- Preceded by: Andrei Shapovalyants
- Succeeded by: Elvira Nabiullina

Personal details
- Born: February 8, 1964 (age 62) Panfilovo, Pavlodar Region, Kazakh SSR, Soviet Union
- Party: Independent
- Other political affiliations: Communist Party of the Soviet Union (until 1991)
- Spouses: Yelena Gref; Yana Golovina (m. 2004)
- Children: 4
- Education: Omsk State University; Leningrad University

German Oskarovich Gref (Russian: Герман Оскарович Греф; born February 8, 1964) is a Russian politician and banker. He was the Minister of Economics and Trade of Russia from May 2000 to September 2007. He has the federal state civilian service rank of 1st class Active State Councillor of the Russian Federation.

He is the CEO and chairman of the executive board of Sberbank, the largest Russian bank.

== Education and early career ==
German Gref was born in Panfilov, Pavlodar Region, Kazakh Soviet Socialist Republic (now Kazakhstan) into a family of ethnic German deportees who were exiled there in 1941. Later Gref was involved in the return of exiled Germans to Russia - with his assistance an entire German village called Strelna was built near St. Petersburg.

There are two versions of what Gref did after graduation. According to one of them, Gref entered the faculty of international economic relations at MGIMO of the Ministry of Foreign Affairs of the USSR, but after the first year he was expelled from the university. According to the other version, after school Gref and his first wife, Elena Velikanova, entered Omsk State University, but failed the exams.

From 1981 to 1982, he worked as a legal advisor for the Irtysh District Department of the Pavlodar Region.

From 1982 to 1984, Gref served in the Soviet Army.

After fulfilling two years of military service, he studied law at Omsk State University in Siberia from 1985 to 1990.

After that he enrolled in the post-graduate program at the Law Department of St. Petersburg State University. He graduated in 1993 under the guidance of Anatoly Sobchak. However, he did not defend his dissertation until 2011. From 1992 to 1998 Gref worked on several positions at the Saint Petersburg City Administration, notably a term as vice-governor from 1997 to 1998. He became a friend and ally of Vladimir Putin during this period; he also made acquaintance with Alexei Kudrin, Dmitry Kozak, and Dmitry Medvedev.

== Ministerial career ==
=== Deputy Minister of State Property (1998-2000) ===
In August 1998, Gref was appointed First Deputy Minister of State Property of the Russian Federation, and was a member of its board until 2000. (Note: His nickname was "Gustav Osmanych" (Russian: "Густав Османыч").) He was also appointed to the board of the Federal Commission for the Securities Market of the Russian Federation and the board of state-owned Svyazinvest and Gazprom in 1999.

=== Minister of Economic Development (2000-2007) ===
Gref was first appointed as Minister of the newly formed Ministry of Economic Development and Trade on May 18, 2000 and was reappointed to the position in the succeeding Cabinet in 2004.

Gref was a major advocate of Russia's joining the World Trade Organization. He is also responsible for 2004 creation of the Stabilization Fund of the Russian Federation.

Gref was considered as one of the liberal reformers in Vladimir Putin's administration of the early and mid-2000s, besides Alexei Kudrin. Gref has repeatedly spoken out against the monopolization of the oil and gas sector of the economy.

Gref resigned in a furore as minister in September 2007 along with Mikhail Fradkov's Second Cabinet.

== Sberbank CEO ==
In November 2007 Gref was elected as president of the state-owned savings bank Sberbank at an extraordinary general meeting. Under Gref's leadership, the bank has undergone a number of radical changes aimed at improving its efficiency and corporate culture.

At various times since he left the civil service he has been a member of the board of directors of such state-owned companies as Gazprom, Aeroflot, Rosneft, Svyazinvest, etc. Until October 2020 he was a member of board of directors of Yandex.

In 2010, speaking at the Davos Economic Forum, Gref spoke in favor of reducing the state's stake in the capital of Russian banks; in particular, he proposed reducing the state stake in Sberbank from 57.6 percent to 50 percent plus one share. In March of the following year, the sale of a 7.58 percent stake in Sberbank was approved by the National Banking Council, and in September 2012 the shares were sold on the stock exchange for $5.22 billion.

In January 2018, Gref was added to the US Treasury's "Kremlin list", a list of 210 officials, politicians and businessmen believed to be close to Vladimir Putin. According to the US Department of Treasury, the list is not a sanctions list and no restrictions are automatically imposed on its subjects. He was later subjected to full U.S. Treasury sanctions following the 2022 Russian invasion of Ukraine.

In 2019 the shareholders of Sberbank re-elected German Gref for a fourth term. In 2023, he was re-elected as the CEO and chairman of the management board for another four-year term.

In February 2019, Gref called upon Russians "to prepare for the very worst of situations" after the U.S. adopted new sanctions against Russia.

In January 2022, Gref, Elvira Nabiullina, and other economic advisors delivered to President Putin a report on international sanctions as well as the effect on the Russian economy if sanctions escalated due to the Russian military buildup on Ukraine's borders. Gref is said to have warned of serious economic impacts, but if he was attempting to dissuade Putin from proceeding with further escalation, this failed after the 2022 Russian invasion of Ukraine began a month later.

=== Sanctions ===
Following the start of the Russian invasion of Ukraine in 2022, Gref was added to the British sanctions list. In April 2022, Gref was added to the European Union sanctions list "in response to the ongoing unjustified and unprovoked Russian military aggression against Ukraine and other actions undermining or threatening the territorial integrity, sovereignty and independence of Ukraine".

He was sanctioned by Canada under the Special Economic Measures Act (S.C. 1992, c. 17) in relation to the Russian invasion of Ukraine for Grave Breach of International Peace and Security, and by the UK government in 2022 in relation to the Russo-Ukrainian War.

== Personal life ==
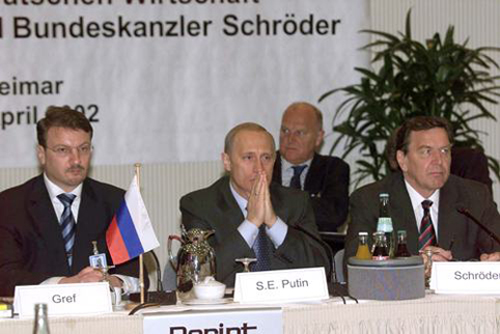
Gref with Vladimir Putin and Gerhard Schröder in Germany in April 2002

Gref married the designer Yana Golovina on May 1, 2004 in the throne room of Peterhof Palace. His wife has a teenage son from a prior relationship, just as Gref has a son, Oleg, from his marriage with Yelena, who refused to move to Moscow when Gref was called into the government in 1998. Since 2006 the couple has a daughter. Oleg studied jurisprudence in St. Petersburg until 2004 and moved to Germany for further education. Gref speaks German and is an admirer of Goethe and German Expressionism.

After the Russian annexation of Crimea and a raised risk of being sanctioned, Gref used the Singapore firm Asiaciti Trust to restructure a $75 million family trust through a network of offshore companies in 2015. He gave more than $50 million held in the trust to a 24-year old nephew who lived outside of Russia, but remained in control of the assets through the offshore companies.

In a November 2016 interview with TASS, Gref revealed that he had done some speculating with Bitcoin.
