= Mikhail Bortnik =

Kazakh politician (born 1960)

- Михаил Бортник
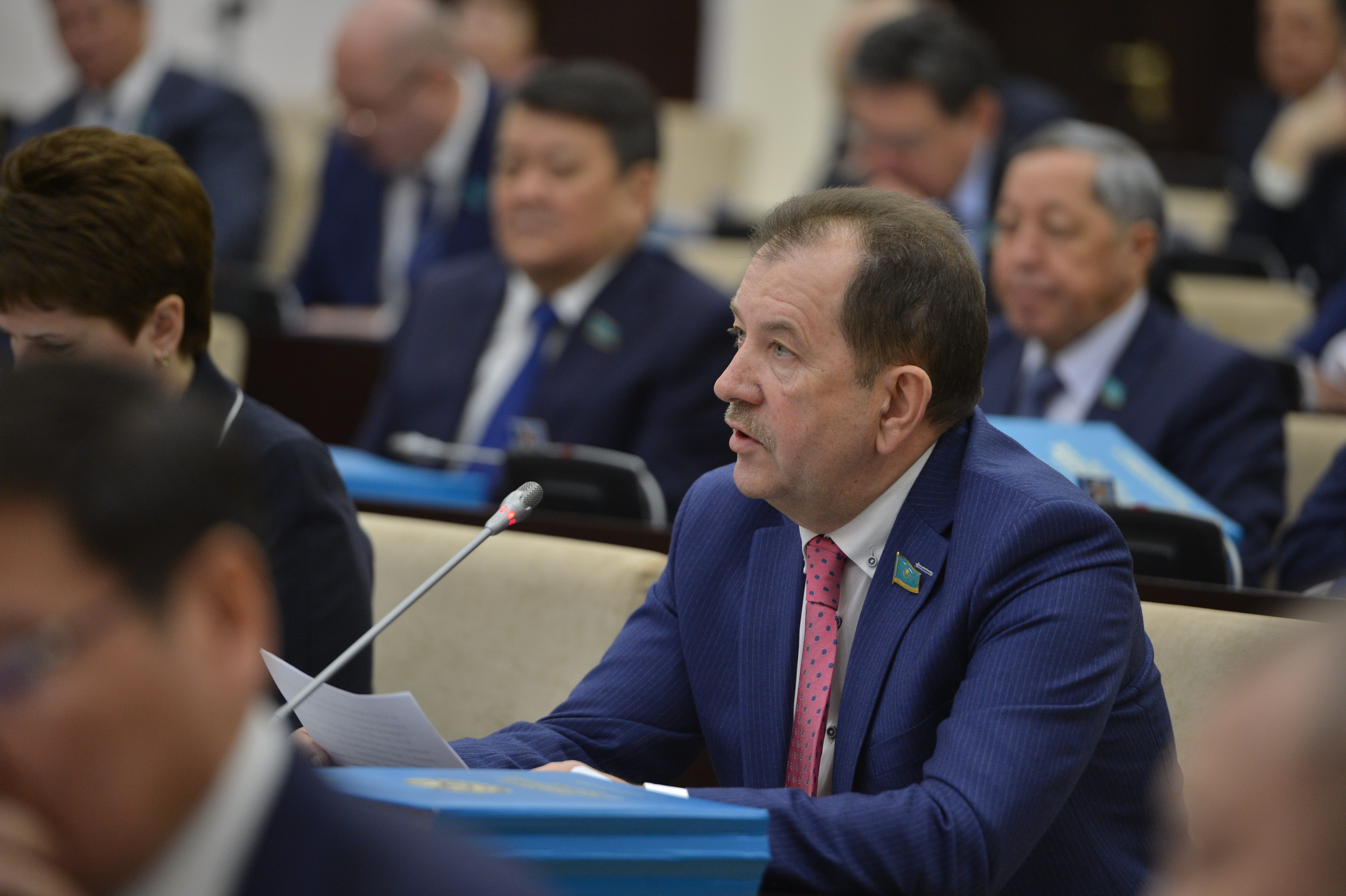
- Bortnik in 2019

Member of the Senate of Kazakhstan
- In office 4 October 2008 – September 2020
- President: Nursultan Nazarbayev; Kassym-Jomart Tokayev
- Constituency: Mangystau Region

Personal details
- Born: 3 May 1960 (age 66) Suvorovo, Ertis District, Pavlodar Oblast, Kazakh SSR, Soviet Union
- Spouse: Irina Bortnik
- Children: 2
- Education: Pavlodar State University; Central Asian University; Yale University
- Occupation: Engineer; jurist; politician

Military service
- Rank: Major in reserve

Mikhail Mikhailovich Bortnik (Note: Alternatively Mykhailo Mykhailovych Bortnyk from Ukrainian: Михайло Михайлович Бортник, though Bortnik does not speak Ukrainian.) (Russian: Михаил Михайлович Бортник; born 3 May 1960) is a Kazakh jurist and politician who served as Member of the Senate of Kazakhstan from 2008 to 2020.

An ethnic Ukrainian, Bortnik now serves as member of the Central Election Commission since 7 November 2024.

== Early life and education ==
Bortnik was born on 3 May 1960 in Suvorovo, Irtysh District, Pavlodar Oblast, Soviet Kazakhstan (now Uzynsu, Pavlodar Region) to Mikhail Ivanovich and Tatyana Stepanovna Bortnik, (Note: Alternatively Mykhailo Ivanovych Bortnyk and Tetiana Stepanivna Bortnyk from Ukrainian: Михайло Іванович Бортник, Тетяна Степанівна Бортник) ethnic Ukrainians.

In 1982, he finished his studies at the Pavlodar Industrial Institute in Pavlodar, becoming an industrial heat and power engineer. Later, in 2002, he received his jurist's diploma from the Central Asian University. In 2006, he had special state official courses at Yale University.

== Career ==
=== Soviet career ===
Bortnik began his career at a plastics plant, as a specialist of technical equipment repair in Shevchenko (now Aktau) from December 1982 to November 1985. From there and until October 1986, he served as the plant's komsomol secretary.

From October 1986 to June 1989, he was the First Secretary of the Shevchenko City Komsomol. He then returned to more technical work from 1989 to March 1998.

=== Kazakh career ===
From March 1998 to March 1999, Bortnik started doing Kazakh politics as Deputy Akim of Aktau. He was then elevated to Deputy Akim of Mangystau Region until October 2008.

At various points, he was a member of the National Commission on Women's Affairs and Family and Demographic Policy under the President of Kazakhstan (since 4 December 2014), member of the Accounts Committee for Control over the Execution of the Republican Budget (September 2020 – November 2022), member of the Supreme Audit Chamber of Kazakhstan (November 2022 – November 2024), and member of the Central Election Commission (since November 2024).

==== Parliamentary career (2008–2020) ====
Bortnik was a Senator of Kazakhstan from Mangystau Region from 4 October 2008 to September 2020.

During different times, he served as member in various Committees of the Senate, such as the Economic and Regional Policy Committee (December 2008 – January 2012), the Economic Development and Entrepreneurship (January 2012 – October 2014), the Economic Policy, Innovational Development, and Entrepreneurship (17 October 2014 – September 2020) Committees.

== Personal life ==
Bortnik only speaks Russian. He is married to Irina Ivanovna Bortnik (born 1960). They have two children, daughter Marina (born 1983) and son Valentin (born 1986).

== Awards and honors ==
Bortnik's state awards and honors include:

- Order of Kurmet (2007)
- Order of Parasat (2014)
- Order of the "Commonwealth" (CIS, 2015)
- Medal "For Distinguished Labour" (Soviet Union, 1985)
- Medal "10 Years of Independence of the Republic of Kazakhstan" (2004)
- Medal "10 Years of the Constitution of Kazakhstan" (2005)
- Medal "10 years of Astana" (2008)
