= 1995 Constitution of Kazakhstan =

1995 Constitution of the Republic of Kazakhstan

Overview
- Original title: 1995 жылғы Қазақстан Республикасының Конституциясы (Kazakh); Конституция Республики Казахстан 1995 года (Russian)
- Jurisdiction: Kazakhstan
- Presented: 30 June 1995
- Ratified: 30 August 1995
- Date effective: 5 September 1995
- System: Unitary semi-presidential republic

Government structure
- Branches: Three
- Head of state: President
- Chambers: Bicameral (Parliament: Senate, Mazhilis)
- Executive: President and Ministers
- Judiciary: Supreme Court
- Federalism: Unitary
- Electoral college: No
- Repealed: 1 July 2026
- Last amended: 19 September 2022
- Location: Archive of the President of the Republic of Kazakhstan, Astana, Kazakhstan
- Signatories: Constitutional referendum by the citizens of Kazakhstan
- Supersedes: 1993 Constitution of Kazakhstan
- Superseded by: 2026 Constitution of Kazakhstan

The 1995 Constitution of the Republic of Kazakhstan (Note: Kazakh: 1995 жылғы Қазақстан Республикасының Конституциясы, romanized: 1995 jylgy Qazaqstan Respublikasynyñ Konstitutsiasy; Russian: Конституция Республики Казахстан 1995 года, romanized: Konstitutsiya Respubliki Kazakhstan 1995 goda) was the highest law of Kazakhstan from 1995 to 2026 when it was replaced by the 2026 constitution of Kazakhstan. The Constitution was approved by a constitutional referendum on 30 August 1995.

As a result of the 2026 Kazakh constitutional referendum, a new constitution is to take effect in Kazakhstan on 1 July 2026. Constitution Day thus falls on the date of the referendum, on 15 March.

The Kazakh language is the official language of the state, while Article 7, section 2 states that the "Russian language shall be officially used on equal grounds". The 2026 Constitution, however, will state that Russian is to be used "alongside" it.

== History ==
=== Background ===
Prior to independence, the Kazakh Soviet Socialist Republic operated under the Constitution of the Kazakh SSR, which was adopted in 1937 and later revised in 1978. Following the dissolution of the Soviet Union in 1991, Kazakhstan declared its sovereignty and began the process of establishing a new legal and political system.

=== 1993 Constitution ===
In January 1993, Kazakhstan adopted its first constitution as an independent republic. This document was a product of the Supreme Soviet, the legislative body that had been established during the Soviet era. The 1993 Constitution was considered a transitional document, which outlined the basic principles of governance but was seen as insufficient for the emerging needs of the nation.

By the mid-1990s, it became evident that the 1993 Constitution did not adequately address the complexities of an independent Kazakhstan. The political landscape had evolved, and there was a growing consensus that a new, more comprehensive constitution was necessary to establish a stable and effective governance framework. The existing constitution lacked provisions for a clear separation of powers, checks and balances, and detailed human rights protections, which were deemed essential for the country's development.

=== Drafting of the 1995 Constitution ===
In preparation for the adoption of a new Constitution, a number of draft projects were examined by the leadership of Kazakhstan. With the purpose of guaranteeing the quality and legitimacy of the final text, President Nursultan Nazarbayev, by decree of 22 May 1995, established the Expert Consultative Council under the President of the Republic of Kazakhstan. Into its composition were included prominent Kazakhstani jurists and state officials, among them Yuri Basin, professor of the Kazakh State Law Institute; Vladimir Kim, head of the Department of State Law at Kazakh State National University; Konstantin Kolpakov, representative of the President in the Supreme Council; Baurzhan Mukhamejanov, head of the Department for Legislation and the Judicial-Legal System of the Presidential Administration; Anatoly Kotov, deputy director of the Research Center for Private Law; Erkesh Nurpeisov, rector of the Kazakh State Law Institute; Gairat Sapargaliev, director of the Institute of State and Law of the Ministry of Justice; Maidan Suleimenov, director of the Research Center for Private Law; and Nagashbai Shaikenov, Minister of Justice.

Alongside these domestic specialists, the work of the commission was also joined by foreign experts. In particular, Sergei Alexeyev, chairman of the Academic Council of the Research Center of the Russian Federation; Jacques Attali, advisor to the Conseil d’État; and Roland Dumas, chairman of the Constitutional Council of France, took active part in its deliberations.

Nazarbayev himself was closely involved in the drafting process. According to later accounts, he personally studied the constitutional models of more than twenty states, with particular attention given to the experiences of Singapore and France, which were regarded as providing valuable examples for a balance between strong presidential authority and institutional stability. Over the course of the drafting, no fewer than 18 revisions of the text were prepared and considered before Nazarbayev and the Expert Council were satisfied with the final version that would be submitted for public approval.

The draft Constitution was published for nationwide discussion on 30 June 1995 during the second session of the Assembly of People of Kazakhstan. Over the following month, debate was widespread: some 33,000–35,000 meetings were held across the republic, and citizens voiced approximately 30,000 proposals and comments. Public associations, trade unions, and social movements were also active, with 58 republican organizations submitting 678 formal proposals and remarks. Although the basic ideology and structure of the draft remained intact, the process of public consultation had a significant impact. In total, more than 1,100 amendments and additions were made, affecting 55 of the 95 articles.

==== 1995 referendum ====
By decree of President Nazarbayev on 28 July 1995, the draft Constitution was submitted to a national referendum, scheduled for 30 August 1995.

The Constitution was approved by a significant majority, entering into force on 5 September 1995. This date has since been commemorated annually as Constitution Day, a national holiday.

=== 2026 Constitution ===
The 2026 Kazakh constitutional referendum to replace the constitution was held on 15 March 2026. The motion passed with the approval of 87% of voters on a turnout of 73%. The new draft will be adopted on 1 July 2026.

== Preamble ==
The preamble of the constitution emphasizes the importance of "freedom, equality, and concord" and Kazakhstan's role in the international community.

"We, the people of Kazakhstan, united by a common historic fate, creating a state on the indigenous Kazakh land, considering ourselves a peace-loving and civil society, dedicated to the ideals of freedom, equality and concord, wishing to take a worthy place in the world community, realizing our high responsibility before the present and future generations, proceeding from our sovereign right, accept this Constitution."

== Section 1, General Provisions ==
=== Article 1 ===
Article 1 establishes the state as a secular democracy that values individual "life, rights and freedoms." It outlines social and "political stability, economic development," patriotism, and democracy as the principles upon which the Government serves. This is the first article in which the Parliament is mentioned.

=== Article 2 ===
Article 2 states that Kazakhstan is a unitary state and the government is presidential. The government has jurisdiction over, and is responsible for, all territory in Kazakhstan. Regional, political divisions, including location of the capital, are left open to lower-level legislation. "Republic of Kazakhstan" and "Kazakhstan" are considered one and the same. The Republic of Kazakhstan shall build its relations with all countries on the principles of international law.

=== Article 3 ===
The government's power is derived from the people and citizens have the right to vote in referendums and free elections. Article 3 establishes provincial government. Representation of the people is a right reserved to the executive and legislative branches. The government is divided between the executive, legislative, and judicial branches. Each branch is prevented from abusing its power by a system of checks and balances. This is the first article to mention constitutional limits on the executive branch.

=== Article 4 ===
Laws that are in effect include "provisions of the Constitution, the laws corresponding to it, other regulatory legal acts, international treaty and other commitments of the Republic as well as regulatory resolutions of Constitutional Council and the Supreme Court of the Republic." The Constitution is made the highest law. Ratified international treaties supersede national laws and are enforced, except in cases when upon ratification the Parliament recognizes contradictions between treaties and already enacted laws, in which case the treaty will not go into effect until the contradiction has been dealt with through legislation. The government shall publish all laws.

== See also ==
- Constitution Day (Kazakhstan)
- Government of Kazakhstan
- Politics of Kazakhstan
- Terrorism and counter-terrorism in Kazakhstan

== Bibliography ==
- Aitken, Jonathan (2009). Nazarbayev and the Making of Kazakhstan. Bloomsbury Publishing. ISBN 978-1-44115-381-4.
