= Ertis, Pavlodar Region =

Ertis Ертіс
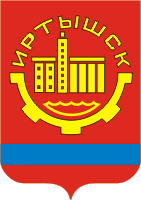
- Coat of arms

- Location in Kazakhstan
- Coordinates: 53°20′00″N 75°27′26″E
- Country: Kazakhstan
- Region: Pavlodar Region
- District: Ertis District

Population (2019)
  - Total: 7,072
- Time zone: UTC+6 (UTC+6)
- Climate: Dfb

Ertis (Kazakh: Ертіс, Ertıs) is a village in northern Kazakhstan. It is the administrative center of Ertis District in Pavlodar Region. Population: 7,772 (2009 census results).

== Geography ==
Ertis is situated on the left bank of the Irtysh River.

== Climate ==
Climate data for Ertis (1991–2020, extremes 1936–present)
Month	Jan	Feb	Mar	Apr	May	Jun	Jul	Aug	Sep	Oct	Nov	Dec	Year
Record high °C (°F)	2.8 (37.0)	5.1 (41.2)	20.3 (68.5)	32.8 (91.0)	37.8 (100.0)	40.7 (105.3)	41.8 (107.2)	39.1 (102.4)	37.3 (99.1)	28.9 (84.0)	16.6 (61.9)	3.8 (38.8)	41.8 (107.2)
Mean daily maximum °C (°F)	−12.9 (8.8)	−10.7 (12.7)	−2.6 (27.3)	11.7 (53.1)	20.4 (68.7)	25.3 (77.5)	26.5 (79.7)	24.4 (75.9)	17.7 (63.9)	9.4 (48.9)	−2.4 (27.7)	−9.7 (14.5)	8.1 (46.6)
Daily mean °C (°F)	−17.2 (1.0)	−15.2 (4.6)	−7.1 (19.2)	5.9 (42.6)	14.1 (57.4)	19.5 (67.1)	20.9 (69.6)	18.5 (65.3)	11.8 (53.2)	4.4 (39.9)	−6.3 (20.7)	−13.8 (7.2)	3.0 (37.4)
Mean daily minimum °C (°F)	−21.6 (−6.9)	−19.8 (−3.6)	−11.8 (10.8)	0.3 (32.5)	7.2 (45.0)	13.3 (55.9)	15.1 (59.2)	12.5 (54.5)	6.3 (43.3)	−0.1 (31.8)	−9.9 (14.2)	−18.1 (−0.6)	−2.2 (28.0)
Record low °C (°F)	−45.6 (−50.1)	−43.7 (−46.7)	−38.7 (−37.7)	−25.0 (−13.0)	−9.9 (14.2)	−1.3 (29.7)	4.8 (40.6)	−1.9 (28.6)	−7.0 (19.4)	−20.0 (−4.0)	−40.7 (−41.3)	−44.6 (−48.3)	−45.6 (−50.1)
Average precipitation mm (inches)	11 (0.4)	12 (0.5)	12 (0.5)	20 (0.8)	24 (0.9)	40 (1.6)	53 (2.1)	39 (1.5)	20 (0.8)	24 (0.9)	18 (0.7)	17 (0.7)	290 (11.4)
Average precipitation days (≥ 1.0 mm)	4.6	3.9	3.3	3.3	5.0	5.6	7.2	6.2	4.8	6.8	6.3	5.0	62
Source 1: Pogoda.ru.net
Source 2: NOAA(precipitation days 1961-1990)
