= Kairat Nurtas =

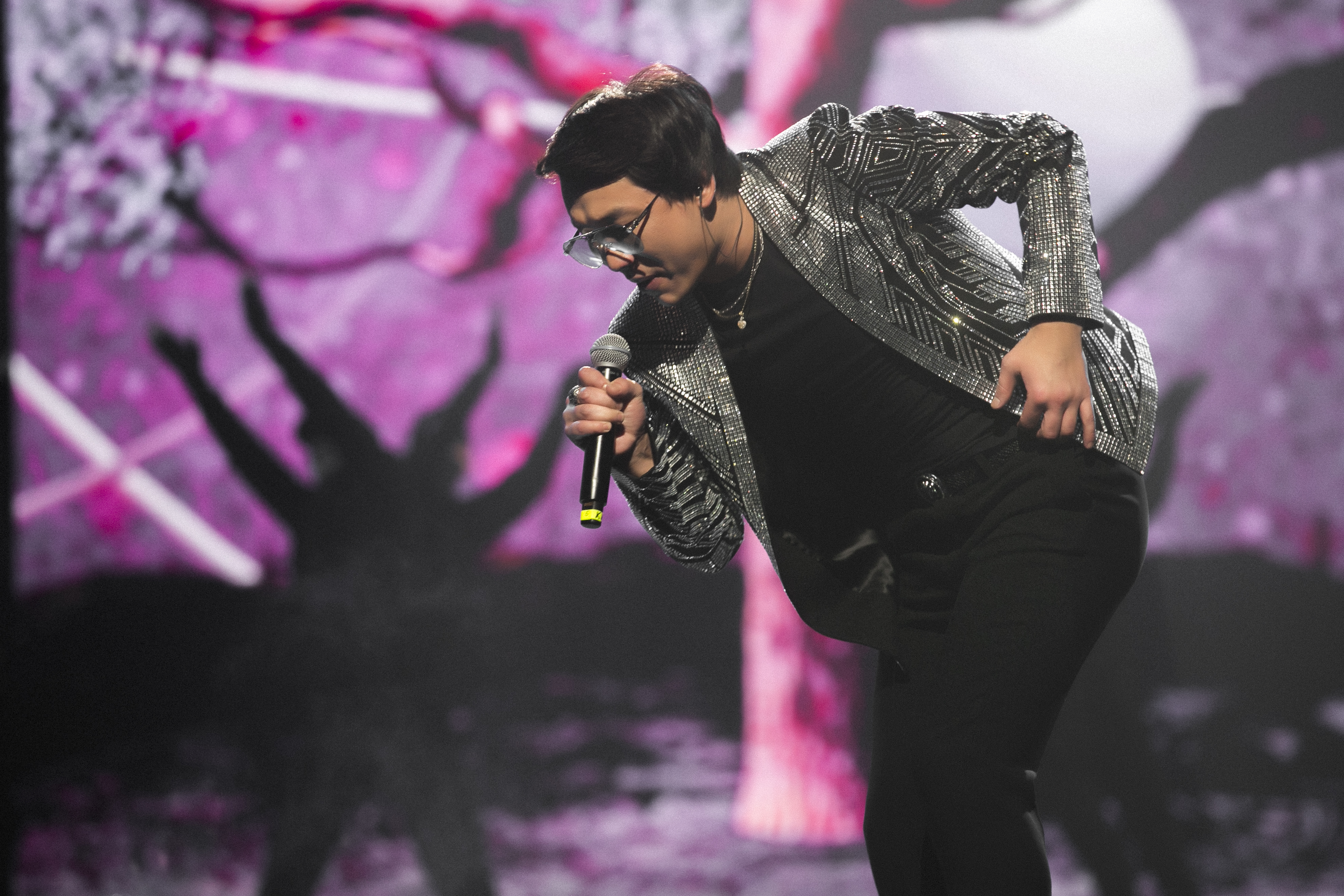
- Nurtas performing in 2020

Background information
- Born: Qairat Nūrtasūly Aidarbekov; 25 February 1989 (age 37); Turkistan, Chimkent Oblast, Kazakh SSR, Soviet Union
- Genres: Pop; folk; toi
- Occupations: Singer; actor
- Labels: Kairat Nurtas Production, Rakhmonov Entertainment
- Website: Official website

Kairat Nurtas (Note: alternatively spelled Qairat, Kazakh: Қайрат Нұртас, romanized: Qairat Nūrtas, [qɑjˈrɑt no̙rtʰɑs]; born Kairat Nurtasuly Aydarbekov, Kazakh: Қайрат Нұртасұлы Айдарбеков, romanized: Qairat Nūrtasūly Aidarbekov) (born 25 February 1989) is a Kazakh singer. He has topped the rating of the most popular local Kazakh musicians, based on CD sales.

== Biography ==
He made his debut on the stage when he was 10 years old in Baikonur. He came forward together with such performers, as Meirambek Bespaev, Nurlan Onerbayev and Toktar Serikov. Kairat released his first single and his debut album in 2006, but his breakthrough came when he gave his first solo concert in 2008 in Almaty. Although his level of recognition was low, after that concert, his popularity started a continuous rise. In the same year, Kairat Nurtas and his mother Gulzira Aidarbekova, who is her son's sponsor and producer, founded the production company "Kairat Nurtas Production" LLP.

He has interpreted the songs of prominent Kazakh composers such as Shamshy Kaldayakov, Aset Beiseuov, Erzhan Serikbayev.

The premiere of feature film, Ökınış, (Regret) was announced in April 2013, being a melodramatic history about his life as a singer. His mother Gulzira Aidarbekova produces and sponsors his performances.

According to the results of EMA-2020, he took the first place in the ranking of "Best Kazakhstani performer". His income amounted to $2.5 million. In 2020, Nurtas became an honorary citizen of Shymkent.

== Controversies ==
In 2018, a lecturer at L. N. Gumilev Eurasian National University Myrzantai Jakyp accused Kairat Nurtas, as well as a number of other Kazakhstani artists, of buying an educational master's grant. According to the teacher, he had never seen Kairat Nurtas in his lectures for two years, but there were orders from the university administration to give the singers good grades. Kairat Nurtas refused to comment on the teacher's statement.

== Personal life ==
Kairat's father is Nurtas Aidarbekov, and Gulzira Aidarbekova (born 1968, maiden name Daribayeva); Kairat's younger brothers are Ayan and Zangar.

Since 2008, Kairat married Zhuldyz Abdukarimova (born April 14, 1988), with whom he has four children: daughters Alau and Sezim, sons Narul and Khan.

He runs the restaurant chain Auz-T.

== Discography ==
- 2006: Äñsağanym
- 2007: Mom
- 2008: Arnau
- 2009: Keşegı
- 2010: Ökınış
- 2011: Äuyrmaidy jürek
- 2012: Şyda jürek
- 2021: Janym
- 2023: Bärı durys pa
