= 1993 Constitution of Kazakhstan =

1993 Constitution of the Republic of Kazakhstan
- Original title: 1993 жылғы Қазақстан Республикасының Конституциясы
- Ratified: 28 January 1993
- Date effective: 28 January 1993
- Repealed: 30 August 1995
- Superseded: 6 September 1995
- Location: National Archive of the Republic of Kazakhstan, Astana, Kazakhstan
- Commissioned by: Supreme Soviet of Kazakhstan, Alma-Ata, Kazakhstan
- Author: Drafting Commission of the Supreme Soviet
- Superseded by: 1995 Constitution of Kazakhstan

The 1993 Constitution of the Republic of Kazakhstan (Kazakh: 1993 жылғы Қазақстан Республикасының Конституциясы; Russian: Конституция Республики Казахстан 1993 года) was the first basic law of Kazakhstan. It was adopted on 28 January 1993 by the Supreme Council of Kazakhstan and remained in force until it was replaced by the 1995 constitution.

The 1993 Constitution established Kazakhstan as a sovereign, democratic, and unitary state, declaring Kazakh language as the state language and Russian as language of interethnic communication. It was the initial legal base for post-Soviet governance but soon was judged as weak in balancing power between branches of government.

== Background ==
After the Dissolution of the Soviet Union in December 1991, Kazakhstan declared independence and faced the need to establish a new constitutional framework. Until then, the 1978 Constitution of the Kazakh SSR, largely based on the 1977 Constitution of the Soviet Union, remained in force. However, it no longer reflected the realities of an independent state, as it preserved Soviet-era institutions and ideological principles.

In response, President Nursultan Nazarbayev and the Supreme Soviet of Kazakhstan began drafting a new constitution to stipulate the foundations of Kazakh sovereignty, define the distribution of political power, and establish the rights and freedoms of citizens in a multiethnic society.

== Drafting ==
At the end of 1991, President Nazarbayev created a working group of 14 members under the chairmanship of the deputy chairman of the Supreme Soviet to draft the new constitution. Work on the text was completed on 25 March 1992, and on 1 June the draft was submitted to the Supreme Soviet, with the first reading held the following day. After this, a four-month period of public discussion was announced: the draft was published in the press, debated at enterprises, institutions, and organizations, and Kazakh citizens sending written proposals and comments.

The most contentious issues during the discussions concerned the status of the Russian language in relation to Kazakh, as well as the division of powers between parliament and the president. These debates reflected both Kazakhstan's multiethnic composition and the uncertainty surrounding the model of state power in the early post-Soviet period.

== Adoption ==
A revised version of the draft was published in November 1992, and in December the Supreme Soviet held a second debate, where a number of additional amendments were introduced.

The final draft of the constitution, which had been rewritten through public hearings and parliamentary debate, was formally adopted during the 19th session of the 12th convocation by the Supreme Soviet on 28 January 1993. Of the 312 deputies present, 309 voted in favor, and three abstained.

The 1993 Constitution of Kazakhstan introduced for the first time provisions on the separation of powers, affirmed the primacy of the individual in relation to the state, and recognized the equality of state and private property. The constitution granted the country a more parliamentary character, giving significant authority to the legislature. The framers paid special attention to constitutional experiences from countries such as the United States and France, adapting foreign principles to the political and social context of post-Soviet Kazakhstan.

== Main provisions ==
The 1993 Constitution consisted of four sections, 21 chapters, and 131 articles, including transitional provisions. It formally recognized Kazakhstan as an independent, secular, and unitary republic, emphasizing that state power derives from the people.

=== Fundamentals ===
The Constitution established the foundational principles of Kazakhstan's statehood and governance:

1. Form of State: The Republic of Kazakhstan is a democratic, secular, and unitary state. It guarantees equal rights to all citizens, reflecting the self-determination of the Kazakh nation.
2. Territorial Integrity: The territory of Kazakhstan is integral, indivisible, and inviolable.
3. Human Rights: The constitution recognizes the individual, their life, freedom, and inalienable rights as the highest value. The state conducts its activities in the interests of citizens and society.
4. Source of Power: The people of Kazakhstan are the sole source of state power, exercising it directly or through representatives. No organization or individual may usurp state authority. Only the Supreme Council and the president may speak on behalf of the people within the limits of their constitutional powers.
5. Public Associations: The constitution guarantees equal and legal opportunities for public associations operating under the constitution and laws of Kazakhstan. The ideology of any association cannot be adopted as state ideology.
6. Separation of Powers: State power is divided into legislative, executive, and judicial branches. Each branch is independent within its authority, and they interact through a system of checks and balances. State power is exercised on the basis of the constitution and laws of the republic.
7. Supremacy of the Constitution: The constitution has the highest legal authority, and its norms have direct effect. Any laws or acts contradicting the constitution have no legal force.
8. Languages: Kazakh is the state language, while Russian serves as the language of interethnic communication. The state guarantees the preservation and free development of interethnic and other languages, and citizens cannot have their rights restricted for lack of proficiency in either language.
9. State Symbols and Capital: Kazakhstan has state symbols including a coat of arms, flag, and national anthem. The capital of the Republic is Almaty.

=== Structure ===
The constitution was divided into four parts, each outlining a key aspect of the state and society:

- Part I. Citizen, his rights, freedoms, and obligations – established the legal status of citizens, guaranteeing rights and freedoms while outlining fundamental duties.
- Part II. Society and its foundational principles – defined the principles of social organization, including equality, property relations, and the role of public associations.
- Part III. State, its bodies, and institutions – regulated the structure and functioning of state institutions, including the presidency, the Supreme Council, government bodies, and the judiciary.
- Part IV. Guarantees of compliance with the Constitution – set mechanisms to ensure the supremacy and direct effect of constitutional norms, and outlined the procedures for resolving constitutional disputes.

== Aftermath ==
Although the 1993 Constitution provided wide guarantees for citizens and established separation of powers, in practice state institutions remained weak. The division of authority between the legislative and executive branches was ambiguous, leading to frequent rivalry between Nazarbayev and the Supreme Council. Deputies often resisted rapid economic reforms, including privatization and market liberalization, contributing to political tension.

The political crisis of 1994–1995 exposed the instability of state mechanisms and the difficulties of governance under a dual-power system, in which both the president and parliament disputed authority.

=== Abolition and replacement ===
In 1995, after republican referendum initiated by Nazarbayev, a new constitution was adopted on 30 August 1995. The 1995 Constitution of Kazakhstan strengthened presidential power and abolished the Supreme Council, replacing it with a bicameral Parliament consisting of lower house Mäjilis and upper house Senate.

As result, the 1993 Constitution became defunct and is remembered as the transitional basic law of early independence period.

== See also ==
- Constitution of Kazakhstan
