= 1995 Kazakh constitutional referendum =

- 30 August 1995
- Do you accept the new Constitution of the Republic of Kazakhstan, the draft of which was published in print on the 1st of August 1995?

Results
| Choice | Votes | % |
|---|---|---|
| Yes | 7,212,773 | 90.01% |
| No | 800,839 | 9.99% |
| Valid votes | 8,013,612 | 99.03% |
| Invalid or blank votes | 78,103 | 0.97% |
| Total votes | 8,091,715 | 100.00% |
| Registered voters/turnout | 8,933,225 | 90.58% |

A constitutional referendum was held in Kazakhstan on 30 August 1995. Voters were asked to approve a draft of a new constitution to replace the Basic Law of 1993. According to official figures, 90% voted in favour of the new constitution, with a turnout of 91%.

The referendum was preceded by the political crisis of 1995. In March, the Constitutional Court ruled the 1994 parliamentary elections unconstitutional, after which the Supreme Council was dissolved and President Nursultan Nazarbayev governed by decrees having the force of law until the end of the year. The 1995 constitution established a presidential system of government and a bicameral parliament. With amendments, it remained in force until 1 July 2026, when it was replaced by a new basic law.

== Background ==
=== 1993 Constitution and the 1994 parliament ===
The first constitution of independent Kazakhstan was adopted by the Supreme Council on 28 January 1993. In late 1993, after a wave of self-dissolutions by local councils, the Supreme Council of the 12th convocation terminated its powers early. A law of 10 December 1993 "On the Temporary Delegation of Additional Powers to the President of the Republic of Kazakhstan and Heads of Local Administrations" gave the president the right to issue decisions of a legislative nature until a new parliament was elected.

On 7 March 1994, elections were held for a new unicameral Supreme Council of the 13th convocation with 177 deputies. The largest number of seats went to the Union of People's Unity of Kazakhstan (32), followed by the People's Congress of Kazakhstan (22), and the Socialist Party and the Federation of Trade Unions (12 seats each). Abish Kekilbayev was elected Chairman of the Supreme Council in the second round.

Relations between parliament and the executive quickly deteriorated: as early as May 1994, deputies passed a vote of no confidence in the government of Sergey Tereshchenko, which resigned in October of that year. In his memoirs, Nazarbayev criticised this convocation for its low productivity: according to him, only seven laws were passed in a year, and the 1994 budget was debated for three months. He also writes that he had already then instructed Minister of Justice Nagashbay Shaikenov to work on a draft of a new constitution.

=== Constitutional Court ruling and dissolution of parliament ===
Tatyana Kvyatkovskaya, a journalist for Kazakhstanskaya Pravda who had lost the election in the Abylaikhan constituency of Almaty, filed a lawsuit against the Central Election Commission with the Constitutional Court. The case was heard from July 1994 to March 1995; on 15 February 1995, Kvyatkovskaya demanded that the entire vote-counting methodology established by the CEC be declared unconstitutional.

On 6 March 1995, the Constitutional Court ruled that the vote-counting methodology introduced by the CEC had "essentially changed the electoral system established by the Election Code", and that the Central Election Commission had thereby violated Article 60 of the constitution by exceeding its authority. The ruling called into question the election results and the legitimacy of parliament. On 8 March the President filed an objection to it, followed on 9 March by Supreme Council Chairman Kekilbayev; on 10 March the court rejected both objections.

On 11 March, the Supreme Council passed a law amending the constitution and a resolution suspending the activities of the Constitutional Court. On the same day, Nazarbayev sent the court an inquiry about the legal consequences of its ruling, and the court replied that the deputies' mandates were unconstitutional. Parliament was dissolved, the government resigned, and Akezhan Kazhegeldin was reappointed Prime Minister; the CEC was also dismissed. Some deputies refused to recognise the dissolution: 72 deputies threatened a hunger strike, and 22 refused to leave the Supreme Council building. The country remained without a parliament for about nine months.

Comparing the peaceful dissolution of parliament with Russia, where the constitutional crisis had ended in bloody clashes, the writer Olzhas Suleimenov remarked of those days: "In Russia it took tanks to disperse parliament, but in Kazakhstan one Tanka was enough" – a pun on Tanka, a diminutive of Tatyana, referring to Kvyatkovskaya.

=== Assembly of Peoples and the April referendum ===
On 1 March 1995, the Assembly of Peoples of Kazakhstan was established by presidential decree. At its first session on 24 March, it adopted a resolution proposing a referendum to extend the president's term until 1 December 2000. In the referendum of 29 April 1995, with a turnout of 91%, 95% of participants voted to extend Nazarbayev's term.

Until a new parliament was elected, the president governed the country through decrees having the force of law. According to Delovoy Kazakhstan, 141 such decrees were issued during the legislative vacuum of 1993–1995, including ones on electoral legislation, the National Bank, bankruptcy, taxes, oil and subsoil use. Nazarbayev wrote in his memoirs that it was these decrees that made the constitutional reforms irreversible.

== Drafting ==
According to Nazarbayev, 18 versions of the constitution were prepared, and he personally studied and took notes on the constitutions of 20 countries. Nazarbayev acknowledged that the new constitution might appear close to the French one, but maintained that it bore a "Kazakhstani signature".

Presidential Resolution No. 2292 of 22 May 1995 established an Expert Advisory Council on the draft of the new constitution. Its members were the Kazakh jurists Yuri Basin, Vladimir Kim, Konstantin Kolpakov, Anatoly Kotov, Baurzhan Mukhamedzhanov, Yerkesh Nurpeisov, Gairat Sapargaliev, Maidan Suleimenov (academic supervisor) and Nagashbay Shaikenov. The foreign experts were Sergey Alekseev (Russia), Jacques Attali and Roland Dumas, then President of the Constitutional Council of France. The Council was to complete its review by 10 June and summarise the proposals received during the nationwide discussion.

The draft was published in the press and put to nationwide discussion. Around 3.3 million citizens submitted about 32,000 proposals and comments. About 1,100 amendments were made to the draft, affecting 55 of its 98 articles. The final version was published on 1 August 1995.

== Calling and conduct ==
The procedure for holding the referendum was governed by Presidential Decree No. 2151 of 25 March 1995 "On the Republican Referendum", which had the force of a constitutional law. It was later formalised as the Constitutional Law "On the Republican Referendum".

The referendum was called by Presidential Decree No. 2389 of 28 July 1995 "On Holding a Republican Referendum on 30 August 1995". Under paragraph 2 of the decree, a single question was put to the vote: "Do you accept the new Constitution of the Republic of Kazakhstan, the draft of which was published in the press on the first of August 1995?"

Voting on 30 August began at 7:00 am at more than 10,000 polling stations.

== Results ==
| Choice | Votes | % |
|---|---|---|
| For | 7,212,773 | 90.01 |
| Against | 800,839 | 9.99 |
| Total | 8,013,612 | 100.00 |
| Valid votes | 8,013,612 | 99.03 |
| Invalid/blank votes | 78,103 | 0.97 |
| Total votes | 8,091,715 | 100.00 |
| Registered voters/turnout | 8,933,225 | 90.58 |
Source: Nohlen et al.

== Aftermath ==
The new constitution proclaimed Kazakhstan a presidential republic. The unicameral Supreme Council was replaced by a bicameral parliament consisting of the Senate and the Mazhilis. According to Nazarbayev, parliament was to focus on lawmaking; its powers included approving the budget, approving or rejecting the government's programme, consenting to the appointment of the prime minister and passing votes of no confidence in the government. Nazarbayev also noted that, unlike the 1993 constitution, the new text explicitly set out the fundamental principles of the state's activity: public harmony, political stability, economic development for the benefit of all the people, and Kazakhstani patriotism.

Nazarbayev called the outcome of the referendum "a victory for all our people", and at the first session of the new parliament in January 1996 he said that by 1995 the crisis of the state system "required an urgent constitutional resolution".

After the constitution came into force, parliamentary elections were held in December 1995. Voting for the Mazhilis took place on 9 December, with a second round on 23 December. Marat Ospanov became Chairman of the Mazhilis, and Omirbek Baigeldi became Chairman of the Senate.

The 1995 constitution was subsequently amended several times, including following the 2022 referendum. On 15 March 2026, a new constitution was approved in a further referendum and came into force on 1 July 2026.

The day of the referendum, 30 August, was celebrated as a public holiday, Constitution Day. With the adoption of the 2026 constitution, Constitution Day was moved to 15 March.
