= Akim =

Title for the head of a local government in Kazakhstan and Kyrgyzstan

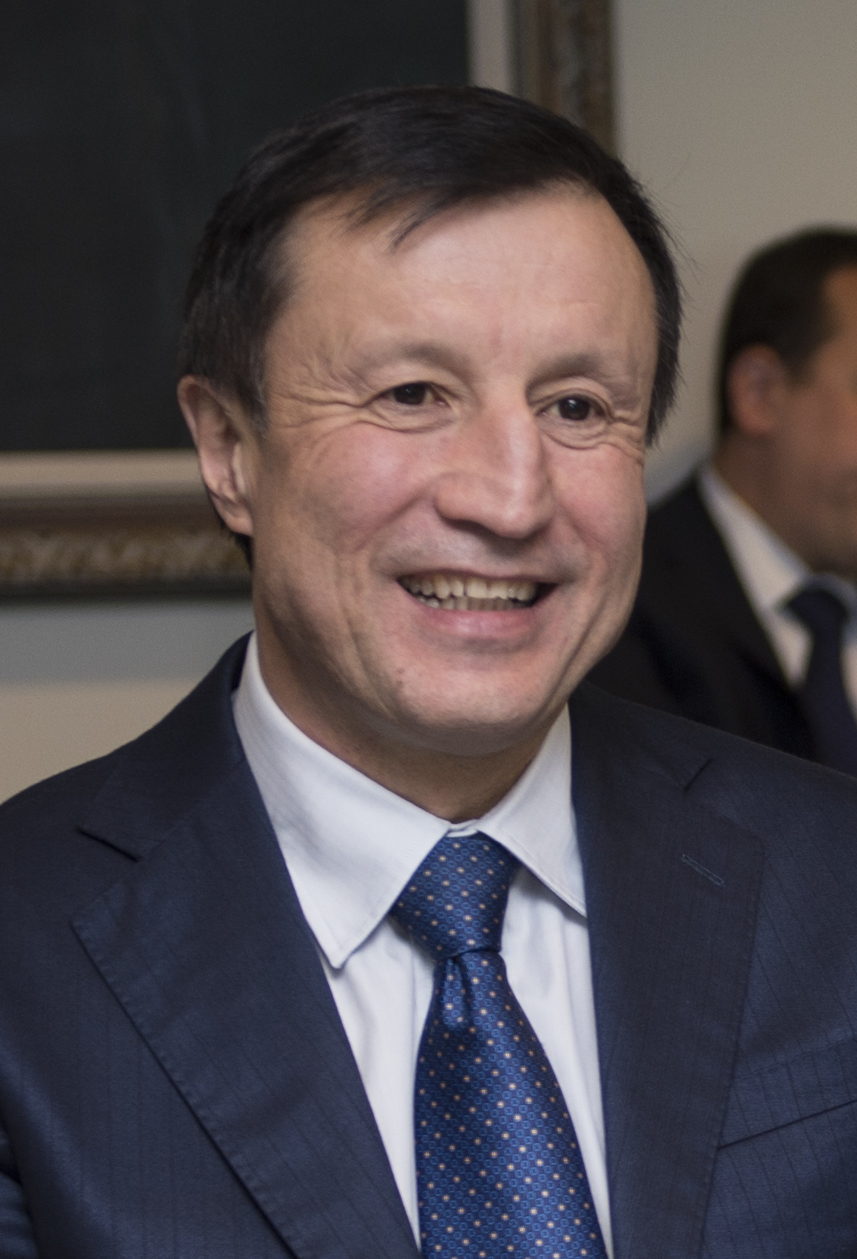
The longest-serving Akim of Astana, Adilbek Zhaksybekov, in 2013

An akim (Kazakh: әкім, Kazakh pronunciation: [ækɘm], pl. әкімдер / äkimder; Kyrgyz: аким; Russian: аким, Russian pronunciation: [ɒkɪm]) is the head of a local government in Kazakhstan and Kyrgyzstan. Akim is derived from the Arabic word حاكم hakim, which means "ruler" or "governor".

== Definitions ==
=== Kazakhstan ===
In Kazakhstan, an äkim is the head of an äkimdik, a municipal, district, or provincial government (äkimdik), and serves as the Presidential representative. After the 1998 amendments to the Kazakh constitution, the president was given full authority to appoint or dismiss the largest äkims, including Astana, Almaty, and at the regional level; the prime minister plays an advisory role. Meanwhile, the äkims of other administrative and territorial units are appointed or selected to the post in an order defined by the President. He may also dismiss äkims from their posts. Powers of äkims ends with the introduction into the post of new-elected president of the republic. Thus, the äkim continues to fulfill the duties before appointment of corresponding äkim by the President of Kazakhstan.

=== Kyrgyzstan ===
In Kyrgyzstan, an akim is a head of an akimiat (state regional administration).
