= Assembly of People of Kazakhstan =

Kazakh political body

Assembly of People of Kazakhstan Қазақстан халқы ассамблеясы (Kazakh) Ассамблея народа Казахстана (Russian)

History
- Founded: 1 March 1995

Leadership
- Chairman: Kassym-Jomart Tokayev
- Deputy Chairman: Marat Äzilhanov
- Founder: Nursultan Nazarbayev

Meeting place
- Aqmeşit Street, 3. Astana

Website
- assembly.kz

Constitution
- Constitution of the Republic of Kazakhstan

The Assembly of People of Kazakhstan (Kazakh: Қазақстан халқы ассамблеясы, romanized: Qazaqstan halqy assambleiasy) is a national political body in Kazakhstan consisting of delegates of the Regional Assemblies of the People. Its task is to represent the various ethnic groups that make up the Central Asian state at national level and to strengthen ethnic/religious coexistence in Kazakh society. It was established in 1995 by President Nursultan Nazarbayev, who served as assembly chairman until April 2021. The assembly is presently chaired by Kazakhstan's president Kassym-Jomart Tokayev.

== History ==
At independence in 1991, Kazakhstan was one of the most ethnically diverse post-Soviet states, and managing interethnic relations was a central concern of the new government. Nazarbayev first proposed creating the Assembly in 1992, at the Forum of the Peoples of Kazakhstan held to mark the first anniversary of independence. It took several more years to establish the institution.

On 1 March 1995 Nazarbayev signed Decree No. 2066, which created the Assembly of Peoples of Kazakhstan as a consultative body under the President, approved its regulations and called its first session for 24 March 1995. Nazarbayev chaired the Assembly from its founding.

The 2007 constitutional amendments gave the Assembly constitutional status. They also gave it the right to elect nine deputies to the Mazhilis, which significantly increased its political role. The body was renamed the Assembly of People of Kazakhstan in the same year. Its legal framework was set out in the Law "On the Assembly of People of Kazakhstan" of 20 December 2008. Laws adopted in June 2010 on the status of the "Leader of the Nation" made Nazarbayev chairman of the Assembly for life.

At the Assembly's 20th anniversary session in April 2015, Nazarbayev proposed a national Day of Gratitude to be marked on 1 March, the date the Assembly was founded. The holiday has been observed since 2016. Unity Day of the People of Kazakhstan on 1 May is also associated with the Assembly.

In January 2026, speaking at the National Kurultai in Kyzylorda, Tokayev said that the historical missions of the Assembly and the National Kurultai had been fulfilled. He proposed merging them into a new body, the People's Council. A new constitution providing for the change was approved in a referendum on 15 March 2026. The Constitutional Law "On Qazaqstan Halyq Keñesi" of 5 June 2026 entered into force on 1 July 2026. On that date the Law "On the Assembly of People of Kazakhstan" and the Assembly's development concept to 2030 ceased to have effect. The People's Council held its first session on 23 September 2026.

== Organization ==
The APK consisted of 384 representatives of all ethnic groups living in Kazakhstan drawn from the Regional Assemblies of the People. The law provided that all APK decisions be considered by public authorities and civil society institutions; APK Deputies participated in the legislative process and can propose legislation. APK Deputies elected 9 members to the Mäjilis until 2023 and the APK reviewed all parliamentary laws to ensure that they are in conformity with the Constitution of Kazakhstan's articles on ethnic harmony and equality.

== Sessions ==
- 2015: The 22nd session of the APK was held on held on 22 April 2015, celebrating the 20th anniversary of the APK. During the session the Kazakh President proposed to introduce a national day of gratitude and mark it on 1 March, the day the APK was established.
- 2016: On April 26, 2016, the 24th annual session of the Assembly of the People of Kazakhstan took place in Astana dedicated to the 25th anniversary of the country's independence. The theme of the 2016 session was "Independence. Consent. Nation united future."
- 2019: The 27th session conference was held in Nur-Sultan on 29 April 2019, with the theme being "Formula of Peace and Harmony: Unity and Modernization."
