= Ertis District =

Coordinates: 53°15′36″N 74°39′36″E

Ertis
- District
- Еrtis Audany
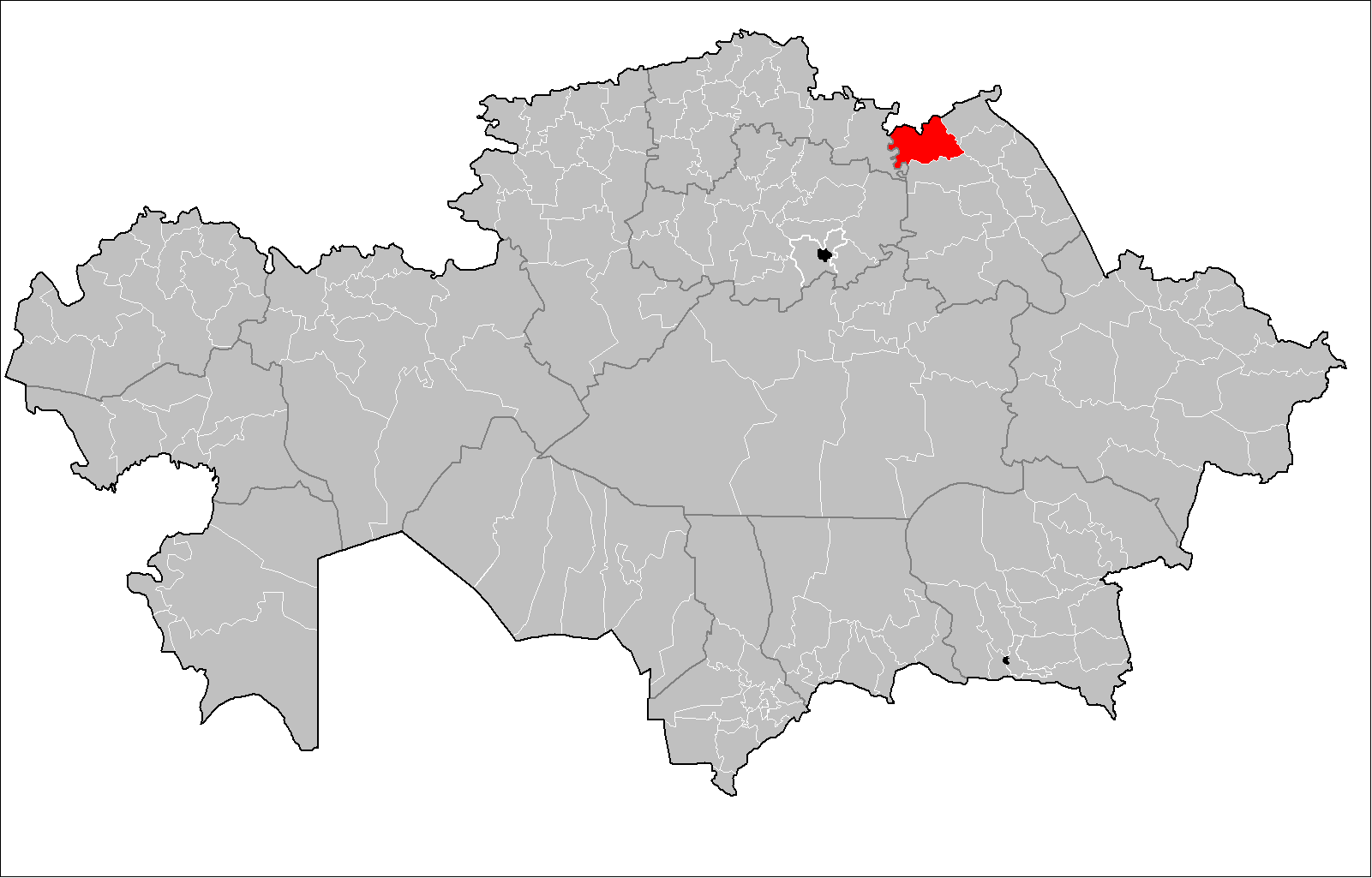
- Country: Kazakhstan
- Region: Pavlodar Region
- Administrative center: Ertis
- Founded: 1928

Government
  - Akim (mayor): Bolatbek Sharipov

Area
  - Total: 3,900 sq mi (10,200 km^{2})

Population (2013)
  - Total: 19,037
- Time zone: UTC+6 (East)

Ertis (Kazakh: Ертіс ауданы, Ertıs audany) is a district of Pavlodar Region in northern Kazakhstan. The administrative center of the district is the selo of Ertis. Population: 19,037 (2013 estimate); 20,853 (2009 census results); 33,129 (1999 census results).

== Geography ==
Lake Kyzylkak, a briny endorheic lake, is located in the district.
