= Order of precedence in Kazakhstan =

The order of precedence in Kazakhstan is the official protocol ranking of state officials used for ceremonial purposes, including state events, diplomatic receptions, seating arrangements, and official processions. It is administered by the State Protocol Service of the Ministry of Foreign Affairs of the Republic of Kazakhstan and is established through presidential decrees.

The system does not determine constitutional succession or executive authority, but it provides a formal hierarchy for state protocol.

== History ==
The modern system of state protocol in Kazakhstan developed after independence in 1991. In the early years, ceremonial arrangements were handled through internal administrative practices without a unified legal framework.

The first formal regulation of state protocol was introduced in 1996 by Nursultan Nazarbayev through Presidential Decree No. 3028, which approved the Basic Provisions of the State Protocol. This established a structured system for ceremonial ranking within state institutions.

A revised framework was introduced in 1999 by Presidential Decree No. 173, which updated the protocol rules and clarified the hierarchy of senior state positions.

The Presidential Decree No. 201 of 12 October 2006 consolidated earlier regulations into a unified framework defining the ceremonial ranking of state officials for domestic and international events. The decree was amended on 20 February 2025 under President Kassym-Jomart Tokayev, including the removal of protocol positions previously assigned to the First President of Kazakhstan.

== Legal basis ==
The order of precedence is regulated by presidential decrees on state protocol and implemented by the State Protocol Service of the Ministry of Foreign Affairs. These acts define the ceremonial ranking of state officials and institutions for official events within Kazakhstan.

The system is administrative in nature and does not form part of the constitutional order of succession.

== Current order of precedence ==
The following is the official protocol hierarchy for officials of the Republic of Kazakhstan during domestic and international events, as defined in Appendices 1 and 2 of Presidential Decree No. 201 (as amended):

Rank	Position
1	President
2	Prime Minister
3	Chairman of the Senate of the Parliament
4	Chairman of the Majilis of the Parliament
5	State Counsellor
6	Head of the Presidential Administration
7	Ex-president
8	Chairman of the Constitutional Court
9	Chief Justice of the Supreme Court
10	Chairman of the National Bank
10-1	First Deputy Prime Minister
10-2	First Deputy Head of the Presidential Administration
11	Secretary of the Security Council
12	Prosecutor General
13	Chairman of the National Security Committee
14	Chairman of the Central Election Commission
15	Executive Director of the President
15-1	Chairman of Samruk-Kazyna Board
15-2	Chairman of the Supreme Audit Chamber
16	Deputy Prime Minister (by date of appointment)
16-1	Deputy Heads of the Presidential Administration
17	Assistant to the President (by appointment)
18	Head of the Office of the President
19	Chairman of the Supreme Judicial Council
21	Deputy Chairman of the Senate of the Parliament
22	Deputy Chairman of the Majilis of the Parliament
23	Minister of Internal Affairs
24	Minister of Defense
25	Minister of Foreign Affairs
26	Head of the State Security Service
28	Heads of agencies reporting to the President
29	Chief of Staff of the Government
30	Ministers (by date appointed)
30-1	Advisors to the President
31	Regional Governors (akims)
33	Special Representatives of the President
34	Head of Presidential Representation in Parliament
35	Deputy Secretaries of the Security Council
36	Head of Presidential Protocol Service
37	Press Secretary of the President
38	Deputy Chairman of the Constitutional Court
39	Members of Parliament (alphabetical order)
40	Heads of national holdings
41	Commissioner for Human Rights
42	State awards holders (Golden Eagle, Heroes of Labour, etc.)
43	Presidential Administration department heads
44	Judges of the Constitutional Court
45	Justices of the Supreme Court
46	Commissioner for Children's Rights and other ombudsmen
47	Judicial Administration Head
48	Heads of national companies
49	Other state officials
50	Political party leaders and public associations

== Bibliography ==
- Tüimebaev, Janseiıt (24 June 2004). Государственный протокол Республики Казахстан [State Protocol of the Republic of Kazakhstan] (PDF) (in Russian). Editorial team: R. S. Zhoshybayev, V. I. Korshunov, B. K. Baibek, R. T. Taufikov, K. P. Kazymbet. Almaty: Printing House "Kompleks". ISBN 9965-730-00-8.

== See also ==
- Kazakh presidential line of succession
- Order of precedence
