= Supreme Judicial Council of Kazakhstan =

Coordinates: 51°7′18″N 71°25′18″E

Supreme Judicial Council of the Republic of Kazakhstan
- Қазақстан Республикасының Жоғары Сот Кеңесі (Kazakh); Высший Судебный Совет Республики Казахстан (Russian)
- Emblem of Kazakhstan

Agency overview
- Formed: 1995
- Jurisdiction: Government of Kazakhstan
- Headquarters: Mangilik El Avenue, 1V, Astana, 010000, Kazakhstan
- Chairman responsible: Dmitry Malakhov
- Website: www.gov.kz/memleket/entities/vss?lang=en

The Supreme Judicial Council of the Republic of Kazakhstan (Kazakh: Қазақстан Республикасының Жоғары Сот Кеңесі; Russian: Высший Судебный Совет Республики Казахстан) is an autonomous state body that ensures the constitutional powers of the president of Kazakhstan in forming courts and safeguarding the independence and immunity of judges.

== Officeholders ==
No.	Portrait	Name	Term of Office		Other offices held while chairman	Source
1		Igor Rogov	1999	2001	advisor to the president	
2		Georgy Kim	15 October 2001	21 March 2002	advisor to the president	
3		Igor Rogov	21 March 2002	12 April 2003	deputy Aqorda Chief of Staff	
4		Maksut Narikbaev	12 April 2003	12 April 2006	Rector of the Kazakh Humanitarian Law University	
5		Igor Rogov	12 April 2006	14 February 2008	Chairman of the Constitutional Court	
6		Oñalsyn Jūmabekov	14 February 2008	20 January 2012	—	
7		Talgat Donakov	20 January 2012	16 October 2013	deputy Aqorda Chief of Staff	
8		Bektas Beknazarov	16 October 2013	11 August 2014	—	
9		Rashid Tusupbekov	11 August 2014	26 August 2015	deputy Aqorda Chief of Staff	
—		Talgat Donakov	14 October 2015	11 December 2015	deputy Aqorda Chief of Staff	
10		Anatoly Smolin	11 December 2015	4 April 2018	Supreme Court Judge (before 3 March 2016)	
11		Talgat Donakov	4 April 2018	7 June 2021	—	
12		Denis Shipp	7 June 2021	19 September 2024	—	
13		Dmitry Malakhov	19 September 2024	Incumbent	—	

== Structure ==
The Office’s structure is approved by the chair of the Supreme Judicial Council (SJC); the Office’s total staff size is approved by the president. The Office is a state institution and a legal entity; it has official seals and stamps in the state language, official letterheads, and treasury accounts. The Office is financed from the republican budget.

As provided in the Regulation, the Office’s organizational units include:

- Secretary of the Supreme Judicial Council — head of the Office;
- Department for Support of the SJC and the Qualification Commission at the SJC;
- Administrative Department.

This structure may be amended by presidential decrees or internal Council decisions.

== Powers ==
The Office of the Supreme Judicial Council provides informational‑analytical, organizational‑legal, and logistical support for the work of the SJC. The Office operates in accordance with the Constitution of Kazakhstan, the Constitutional Law “On the Judicial System and the Status of Judges of the Republic of Kazakhstan,” the Law “On the Supreme Judicial Council of the Republic of Kazakhstan,” acts of the president and the Government of Kazakhstan, this Regulation, and other legal acts.

- providing informational, analytical and organizational‑legal support to the chair and members of the Council on matters within the Council’s competence;
- preparing materials and organizing Council meetings, and ensuring implementation of Council decisions;
- supplying the Council and the Qualification Commission at the Council with financial, material and technical support in accordance with the law;
- preparing reports for the president on the Council’s work and the status of judicial personnel;
- organizing the Council’s work to safeguard judicial independence and immunity;
- organizing competitive selection procedures and preliminarily reviewing candidates’ documents for vacant positions (chairs and judges of district and equivalent courts, chairs of judicial panels, judges of regional and equivalent courts, and judges of the Supreme Court);
- preparing analytical materials on organizational and personnel matters brought before the Council, including proposals and materials concerning:
  - nominations by the chair of the Supreme Court for appointment to chairmanships and judicial panels;
  - candidates for chair of the Supreme Court and for appointment to the Supreme Court by extraordinary procedure;
  - termination and resumption of powers of chairs, panel chairs and judges of the Supreme Court, regional and local courts in cases such as resignation, reorganization, reductions in the number of judges, transfers, professional unsuitability (based on the Quality of Justice Commission recommendations), health grounds, criminal convictions or deprivation of citizenship;
  - confirmation of newly appointed district court judges after a one‑year probationary period following a positive assessment by the Quality of Justice Commission;
  - requests by judges to appeal decisions of the Judicial Jury and the Quality of Justice Commission;
  - requests for consent to detention, arrest, house arrest, or other restrictive measures regarding judges, and for submission of conclusions to the president concerning such measures;
  - consent to determine the total number of judges and the number of judges in each local and other court;
  - formation of a personnel reserve for chairpersons and judges of district, regional and Supreme Court posts.
- drafting presidential decrees on appointments and dismissals of chairs and judges of local and other courts;
- supporting the activities of the Judicial Jury and the Personnel Reserve Commission;
- proposing improvements to the judicial system and related legislation;
- supporting Council activities aimed at improving the quality and training of the judiciary, including continuing education and professional development of judges;
- preparing the Council’s regulations;
- administering qualification examinations for candidates for judicial office, keeping records of persons who passed qualification exams, those who completed internships, and graduates of the Academy of Justice under the Supreme Court;
- preparing the Council’s annual National Report on the state of judicial personnel and arranging for its submission to the President and subsequent publication;
- maintaining an electronic personnel register of judges;
- coordinating interaction between the Council and other state bodies, foreign authorities and international organizations;
- organizing Council procedures on psychological testing of judicial candidates, the issuance of judicial identity documents, and regulations on Council interaction with courts;
- considering appeals from individuals and legal entities;
- performing other functions entrusted by the legislation of Kazakhstan.

== Composition ==
The Office’s composition is determined by its approved structure and authorized staffing. The head of the Office (the secretary of the Supreme Judicial Council) is appointed and dismissed by the president and is personally responsible for the Office’s performance.

The head’s main powers and duties include organizing, coordinating and supervising the Office and its subdivisions; preparing the Council agenda on members’ proposals and informing the chair; certifying extracts from session minutes, recommendations and Council decisions; organizing inspections and ensuring attendance of invited persons; executing orders of the chair and Council decisions; approving, in agreement with the chair, regulations for structural units; and controlling discipline and labor order.

The head also manages personnel and administrative matters — appointing and dismissing staff, approving job descriptions, resolving leave, travel, training, remuneration and disciplinary issues — within legal limits. Financially, the head prepares the budget request, oversees procurement and payment orders, approves financial plans and reports, and represents the Council before state bodies and organizations. In the head’s absence, a designated employee performs these duties in accordance with law.

== Legal status ==
The Office is a legal entity established as a state institution and may hold separate property under operational management where provided by law. Its assets are formed from property transferred by the owner and are part of the republican property. The Office may enter into civil‑law relations on its own behalf and, when authorized by law, act in civil matters on behalf of the state.

As a rule, the Office may not independently dispose of property assigned to it or property acquired with funds from the financing plan, except where the law permits. The Office is also prohibited from contracting private business to perform duties that are its statutory functions.
