= Janat Elimanov =

Kazakh politician (born 1978)

- Жанат Элиманов
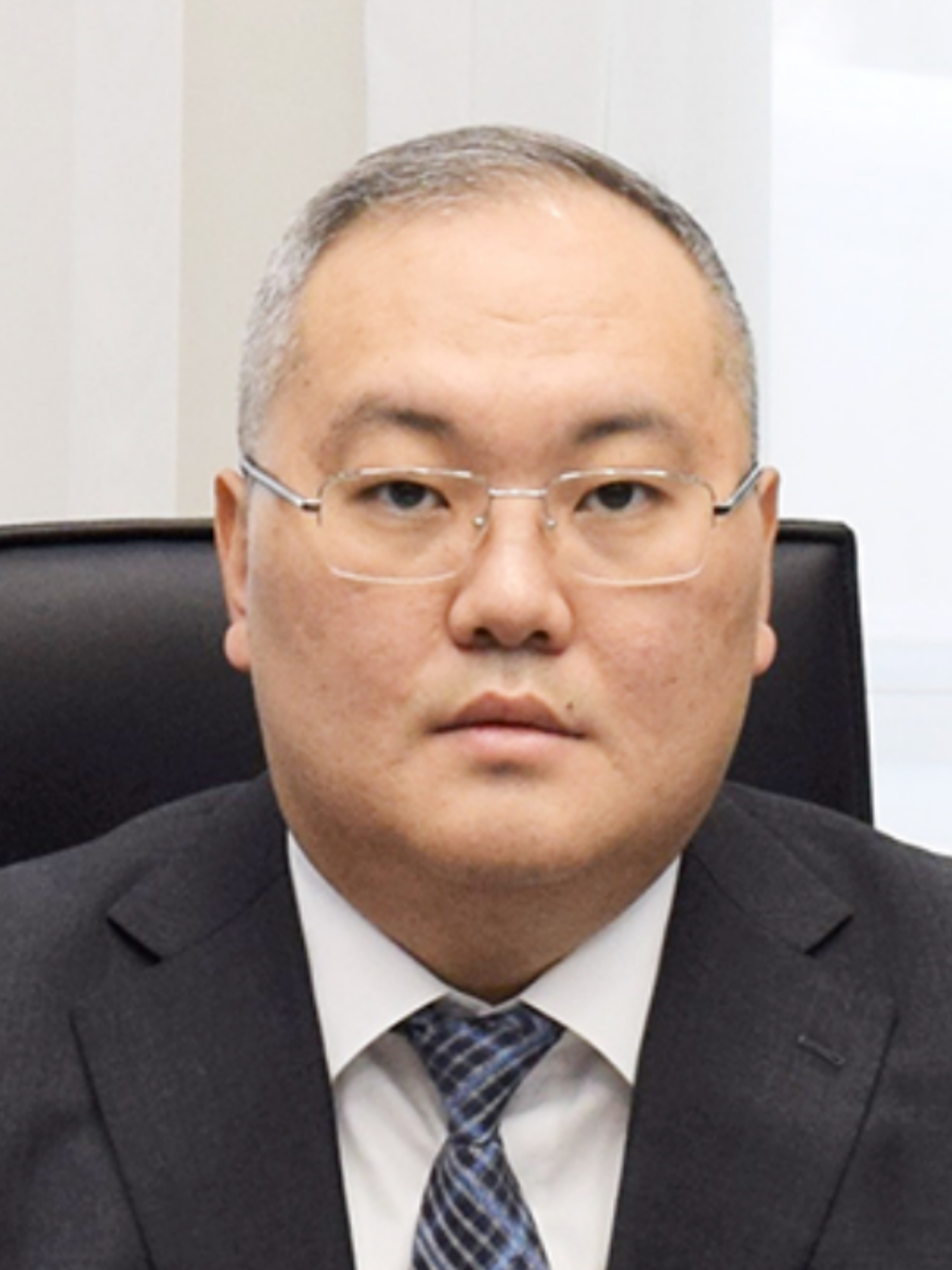
- Elimanov in 2020

Chairman of the Financial Monitoring Agency
- Incumbent
- Assumed office 16 September 2024
- President: Kassym-Jomart Tokayev
- Preceded by: Dmitry Malakhov
- In office 28 January 2021 – 13 February 2024
- President: Kassym-Jomart Tokayev
- Preceded by: Office established
- Succeeded by: Dmitry Malakhov

Personal details
- Born: 16 August 1978 (age 48) Karaganda, Kazakh SSR, Soviet Union
- Education: Karagandy State University
- Awards: Order of Valor (2nd class)

Military service
- Service: National Security Committee
- Years of service: 2024
- Rank: highest qualification class, 3rd category

Janat Qaldybekuly Elimanov (Note: Often transliterated as Zhanat Kaldybekovich Elimanov through a Russified Romanization of Жанат Калдыбекович Элиманов.) (Kazakh: Жанат Қалдыбекұлы Элиманов; born 16 August 1978) is a Kazakh lawyer and politician who currently serves as the chairman of the Financial Monitoring Agency since 2024.

== Early life and education ==
Elimanov was born in the city of Karaganda, Kazakh Soviet Socialist Republic, Soviet Union (now Kazakhstan) on 16 August 1978.

In 1999, he graduated from the Karagandy State University with a degree in jurisprudence.

== Early career ==
Elimanov career began in 2000 when he joined prosecutor's office of Karaganda as a prosecutor of the Department for Supervision of the Legality of Court Decisions and Enforcement Proceedings. Later, before 2001, he work as an assistant prosecutor of the Sovetsky District (now Kazybek bi district).

From 2001 to 2004, he worked at the Prosecutor's Office of Karaganda Region as a prosecutor in the Departments for Supervision of the Legality of Court Decisions in Civil Cases and for Supervision of Legality in the Activities of State Bodies. In 2003 he was promoted to senior prosecutor of the latter department.

Since 2004 his career has continued in Astana. Before 2007 he held the position of deputy head of the Department for Supervision of Legality in the Activities of State Prosecutor's Offices.

From 2007 to 2009 he acted as Prosecutor General's senior assistant.

In 2009, he advised the justice minister. From 2009 to 2012, he served as deputy chairman of the Committee for Registration Service and Legal Assistance at the Ministry of Justice.

In 2012, he headed the Information and Analytical Department and subsequently, until 2014, led the Department for Disclosure of Economic and Financial Crimes at the Agency for Combating Economic and Corruption Crime.

From 2014 to 2017, he directed the Department of Operational Investigative Activities of the State Revenue Committee of the Ministry of Finance.

From 2017 to 2019, he was deputy head of the Department of Legal Protection and chief of the Office for Supervision of Legality in the Economic Sphere at the Prosecutor General's Office.

In 2019, he returned to the Karaganda region as a deputy prosecutor.

From 2019 to 2020 he served as a deputy chairman of the Finance Ministry's Financial Monitoring Committee.

== Political career ==
On 27 January 2020, by decree of finance minister Älihan Smaiylov Elimanov was appointed chairman of the Financial Monitoring Committee of the Finance Ministry. On 28 January 2021, the Financial Monitoring Committee was separated from the Ministry of Finance and reorganized as the Financial Monitoring Agency. On the same day, by decree of president Kassym-Jomart Tokayev, Elimanov was appointed the agency's first chairman.

On 13 February 2024, he was removed and appointed first deputy chairman of the National Security Committee, a position vacant for two years after Murat Nurtileu.

On 16 September the same year, he was relieved of the post and returned as chairman of the Financial Monitoring Agency.

== Honours ==
- Order of Valor, 2nd class (2025)

=== Ranks ===
- highest qualification class, 3rd category (2022)
