= Supreme Judicial Council =

Supreme Judicial Council may refer to:

- Supreme Judicial Council of Armenia
- Supreme Judicial Council of Bangladesh
- Supreme Judicial Council of Iraq
- Supreme Judicial Council of Kazakhstan
- Supreme Judicial Council of Libya
- Supreme Judicial Council of Pakistan
- Supreme Judicial Council of Saudi Arabia
- Supreme Judicial Council of Syria
