= Dmitry Malakhov =

Kazakh politician

- Дмитрий Малахов
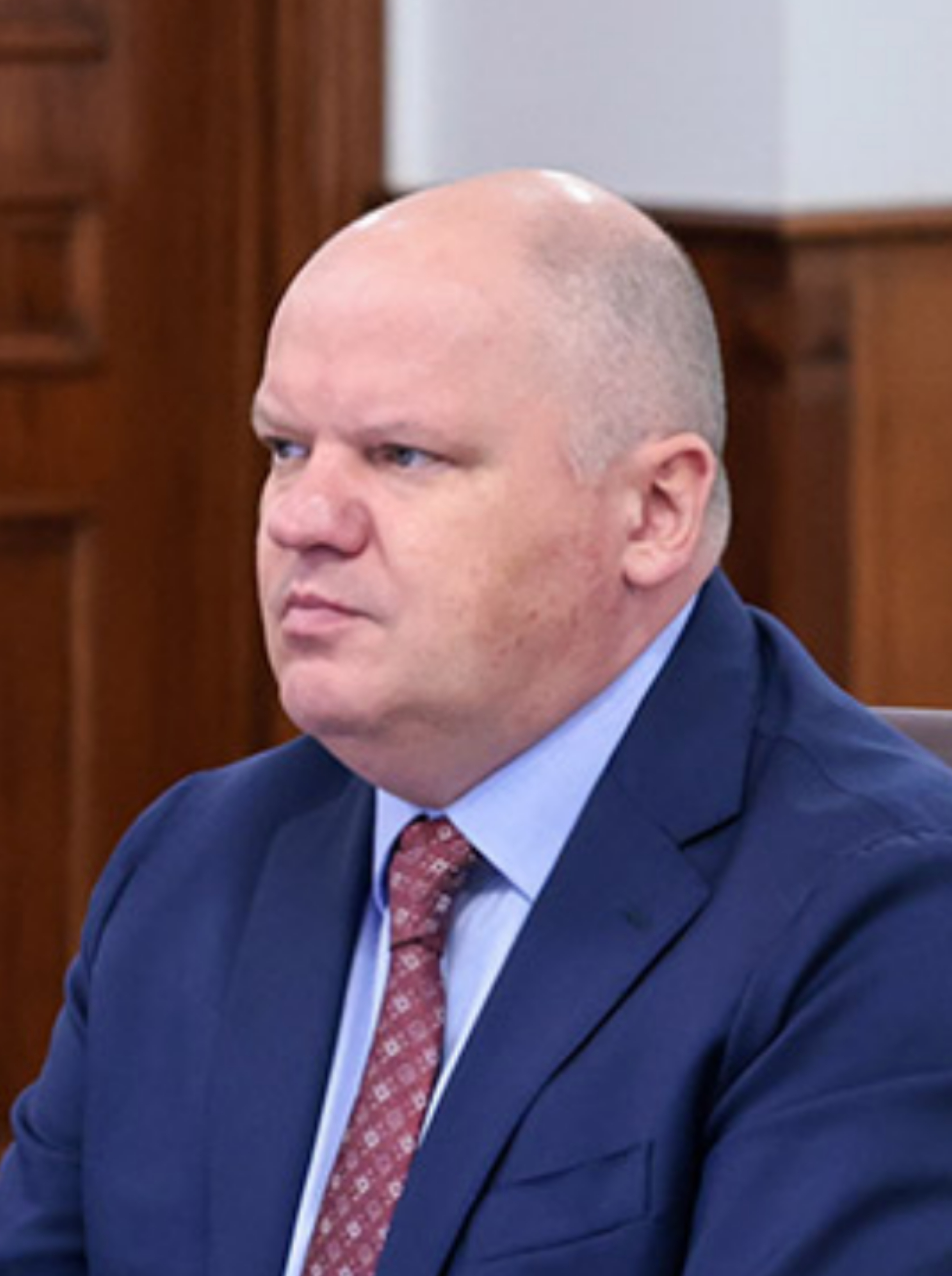
- Malakhov in 2024

Chairman of the Supreme Judicial Council
- Incumbent
- Assumed office 19 September 2024
- President: Kassym-Jomart Tokayev
- Preceded by: Denis Shipp

Chairman of the Financial Monitoring Agency
- In office 13 February 2024 – 16 September 2024
- President: Kassym-Jomart Tokayev
- Preceded by: Janat Elimanov
- Succeeded by: Janat Elimanov

Personal details
- Born: 27 August 1974 (age 51) Kokshetau, Akmola Region, Kazakh SSR, Soviet Union
- Children: 2
- Parent: Mikhail Malakhov (father)
- Education: Almaty Academy of the Ministry of Internal Affairs of Kazakhstan
- Alma mater: Turar Ryskulov Kazakh Economic University
- Awards: Order of Valor, Order of Parasat

Military service
- Rank: Major General of the Anti-Corruption Agency

Dmitry Mikhailovich Malakhov (Kazakh: Дмитрий Михайлович Малахов, Russian: Дмитрий Михайлович Малахов; born 27 August 1974) is a Kazakh lawyer and economist who currently serves as the chairman of the Supreme Judicial Council since 2024. He served as chairman of the Financial Monitoring Agency from February to September 2024.

== Early life and education ==
Malakhov was born on 27 August, 1974, in the city of Kokshetau, Akmola Region, Kazakh Soviet Socialist Republic, Soviet Union (now Kazakhstan). His father, Mikhail Malakhov (born 1946) was a chairman of the Supreme Court of Kazakhstan from 1993 to 1996.

In 1995, he graduated from the Almaty Academy of the Ministry of Internal Affairs of Kazakhstan with a degree in jurisprudence.

In 2005, he completed a Turar Ryskulov Kazakh Economic University with a degree in economics.

== Early career ==
Malakhov began his career in July 2004 as a deputy Head of Regional Departments and Departments of Central Offices of the Ministry of Internal Affairs. Until March 2019, he held positions as deputy head of Regional Departments and Departments of Central Offices of the, Agency for Combating Economic and Corruption Crime, National Anti-Corruption Bureau, Agency for Civil Service Affairs and Anti-Corruption. From March 2019 to September 2020 he served as head of the Operations Department of the Financial Monitoring Committee (now Financial Monitoring Agency) of the Ministry of Finance.

== Political career ==
On 3 September, 2020, he was appointed deputy chairman of the Anti-Corruption Agency. On 7 March, 2022, he was promoted to first deputy chairman.

On 11 October, 2023, by Tokayev's decree he was relieved of his duties and appointed deputy chairman of the Financial Monitoring Agency. On 13 February, 2024, by Tokayev's decree No. 480 he was appointed Chairman of the same agency. Seven months later, on 16 September, he was relieved of the post.

On 19 September the same year Tokayev's assistant Yerzhan Zhiyenbayev in Senate read out his suggestion to appoint Malakhov as Chairman of the Supreme Judicial Council. Senators unanimously approved the suggestion and by Tokayev's decree No. 657 he assumed the post.

== Personal life ==
Malakhov is married and has two sons. His sons also work in law enforcement, and their wives are employed as notaries.

His brother, Vladimir Malakhov (born 1977), served as first deputy prosecutor of the Karaganda Region from 2023 to 2024 and of the Akmola Region from 2020 to 2023.

== Honours ==
- Order of Valor, 2nd class (2020)
- Order of Parasat (2025)

=== Ranks ===
- Major General of the Anti-Corruption Agency (2022)
