= Fariza (given name) =

Fariza is an Arabic and Central Asian feminine given name borne by:

- Fariza Ongarsynova (1939–2014), Kazakh poet
- Fariza Magomadova (born 1925), former Chechen boarding school director and teacher
- Fariza Aldangorova (born 1996), Kazakhstani taekwondo practitioner
