= Anar Zhailganova =

Kazakh judge and politician (1969–2024)

Anar Jaiylğanova
- Анар Жайылғанова
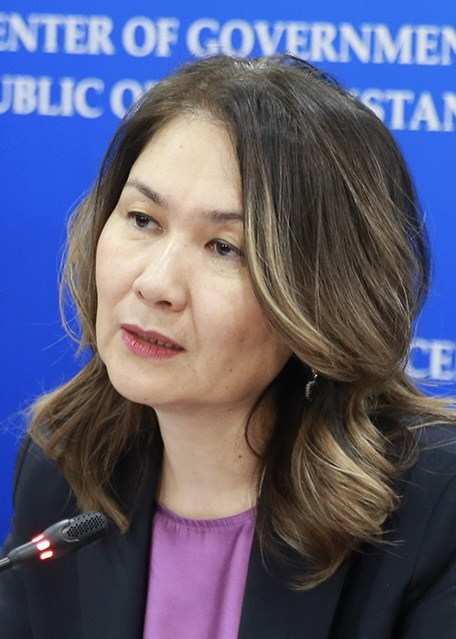
- Jaiylğanova in 2019

Member of the Mäjilis
- In office 24 March 2016 – 19 June 2019

Judge of the Constitutional Council of Kazakhstan
- In office 13 March 2008 – 29 January 2016

Justice of the Supreme Court of Kazakhstan
- In office December 2004 – 13 March 2008

Personal details
- Born: 10 July 1969 Semipalatinsk, Kazakh SSR, Soviet Union
- Died: 12 February 2024 (aged 54) Kazakhstan
- Party: Nur Otan
- Education: Al-Farabi Kazakh National University
- Occupation: Judge

Anar Nūralyqyzy Jaiylğanova (Kazakh: Анар Нұралықызы Жаилғанова; 10 July 1969 – 12 February 2024) was a Kazakh judge and politician. A member of Nur Otan, she served on the Supreme Court from 2004 to 2008, the Constitutional Council from 2008 to 2016, and the 6th Mäjilis from 2016 to 2019.

Jaiylğanova died on 12 February 2024, at the age of 54. She is buried at the National Pantheon of Kazakhstan.
