= National Pantheon of Kazakhstan =

Cemetery in Akmola Region, Kazakhstan

- Қазақстан Ұлттық пантеоны
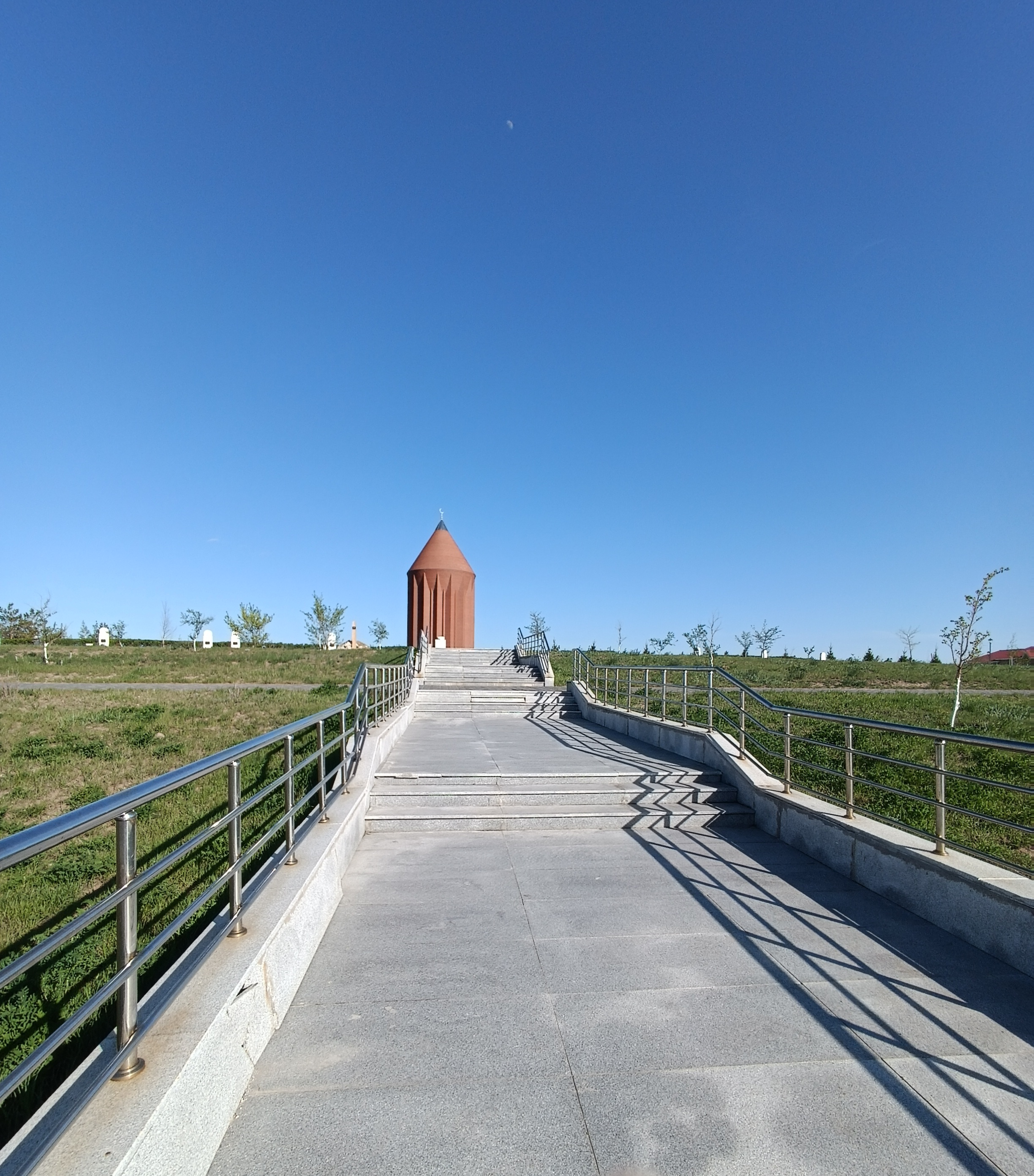
- Interactive map of National Pantheon of Kazakhstan

Details
- Established: 2020
- Location: Tseliongrad District, Akmola Region, Kazakhstan
- Country: Kazakhstan
- Coordinates: 50°52′22″N 71°24′34″E
- Type: Private
- Size: 10 square kilometres (2,500 acres)
- No. of graves: 26 (as of 2024)

National Pantheon of Kazakhstan (Kazakh: Қазақстан Ұлттық пантеоны, Russian: Национальный пантеон Казахстана) is an elite cemetery located 17 kilometres (11 mi) south of Astana, near the Kabanbay Batyr village, Tselinograd District, Akmola Region.

== History ==
The pantheon is built around the Kabanbay Batyr mausoleum. The decree on its establishment was approved in 2014, and its construction began in 2015. The cemetery was opened in June 2020 and it is maintained by the Esil District, Astana Akimat.

== Rules ==
The following people are to be buried in the National Pantheon:

- Presidents of Kazakhstan
- Prime ministers of Kazakhstan and their deputies, chairpersons of the Senate and the Mäjilis, state counsellors, heads of the Presidential Administration, chairpersons of the Constitutional Court, the Supreme Court, and the National Bank
- ministers, heads of state bodies directly subordinate and accountable to the President of Kazakhstan, akims of regions, cities of republican significance and the capital
- people named People's Hero and Hero of Labour
- citizens awarded the Order of the Golden Eagle, the Order of Fatherland, and the Order of Work Glory
- people awarded the titles of Hero of the Soviet Union and Hero of Socialist Labour
- people named Pilot-Cosmonaut of Kazakhstan
- other people by the decision of the President

All gravestones are designed to look the same, and unlike other cemeteries of Kazakhstan, the person's tribe or Jüz is not listed.

== List of burials ==
Even before the establishment of the cemetery was announced in 2013, there were some people buried there. Following is the list of all the burials as of 16 May 2024:

- Abish Kekilbayev (1939–2015), Soviet and Kazakh politician, State Counsellor of Kazakhstan from 1996 to 2002
- Fariza Ongarsynova (1939–2014), Soviet and Kazakh poet
- Oral Muhamedjanov (1947–2013), Kazakh politician and Chairman of the Mäjilis from 2004 to 2007 and from 2008 to 2011
- Maksut Narikbaev (1940–2015), Kazakh jurist and Chairman of the Supreme Court from 1996 to 2000
- Qonysbai Äbil (1954–2022), Kazakh aitysker, satiricist, composer, journalist and poet
- Qosman Aitmuhametov (1963–2020), Kazakh politician, Äkim of Akmola Region from 2013 to 2014
- Gülbanu Altynbaeva (1946–2016), wife of Defense Minister Mukhtar Altynbayev
- Kenzhegali Sagadiyev (1938–2020), academic and President of the Academy of Sciences
- Klara Jumabaeva (1941–2020), widow of politician Abish Kekilbayev
- Saiahat Qonaqai (1955–2014), brother of First Lady Sara Nazarbayeva
- Sergey Dyachenko (1952–2016), Kazakh politician, Äkim of Akmola Region from 2010 to 2012
- Qozy-Körpeş Jañbyrşin (1960–2017), Kazakh politician, chairman of the Accounts Committee
- Zeinolla Şaidarov (1933–2020), Soviet politician
- Ibragim Jangurazov (1937–2020), Soviet and Kazakh agriculturalist
- Änes Sarai (1937–2021), Soviet and Kazakh writer, dramaturgist, and journalist
- Baian Jaqypova (1949–2021), wife of politician Kabibulla Dzhakupov
- Serik Qirabaev (1927–2021), Soviet, Kazakh and Kyrgyz academic
- Qojahmet Balahmetov (1926–2021), Soviet and Kazakh historian, pedagogue and Minister of Enlightenment of the Kazakh SSR from 1974 to 1987
- Mnaura Sagindykova (1951–2022), wife of politician Eleusin Sagyndyqov
- Qajymurat Nagmanov (1948–2022), Soviet and Kazakh politician
- Maria Gabdullina (1938–2022), wife of writer and academic Myrzatai Joldasbekov
- Klara Bazi (1939–2023), wife of Ibragim Baigoraz
- Nesipbek Ait (1950–2023), Soviet and Kazakh poet, translator, and journalist
- Anar Zhailganova (1969–2024), Kazakh judge and politician
- Seyidahmet Quttyqadam (1946–2024), Kazakh politologist and publicist
- Omirbek Baigeldi (1939–2024), Kazakh politician and Chairman of the Senate from 1996 to 1999

== Gallery ==
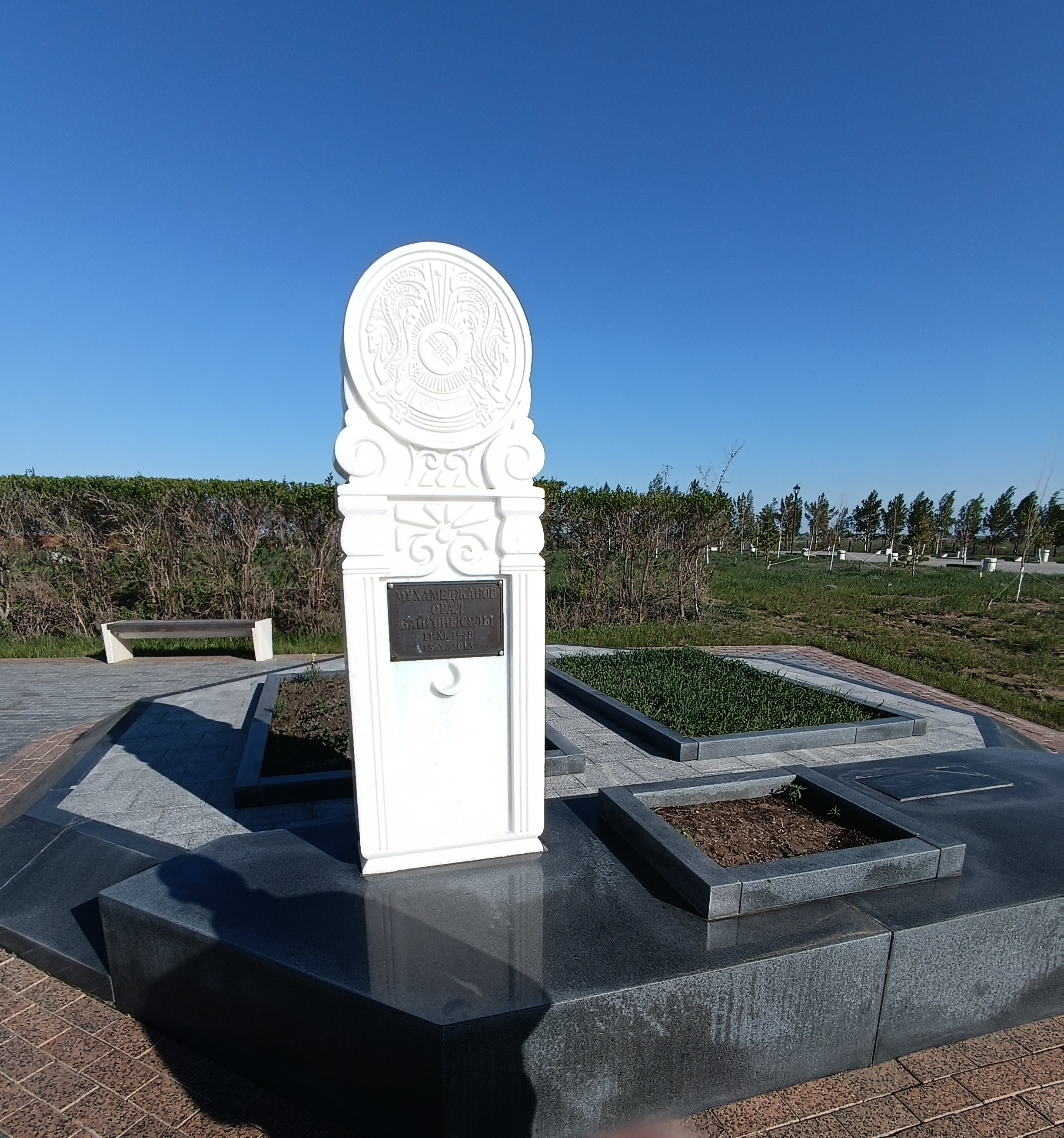
Gravestone of Oral Muhamedjanov

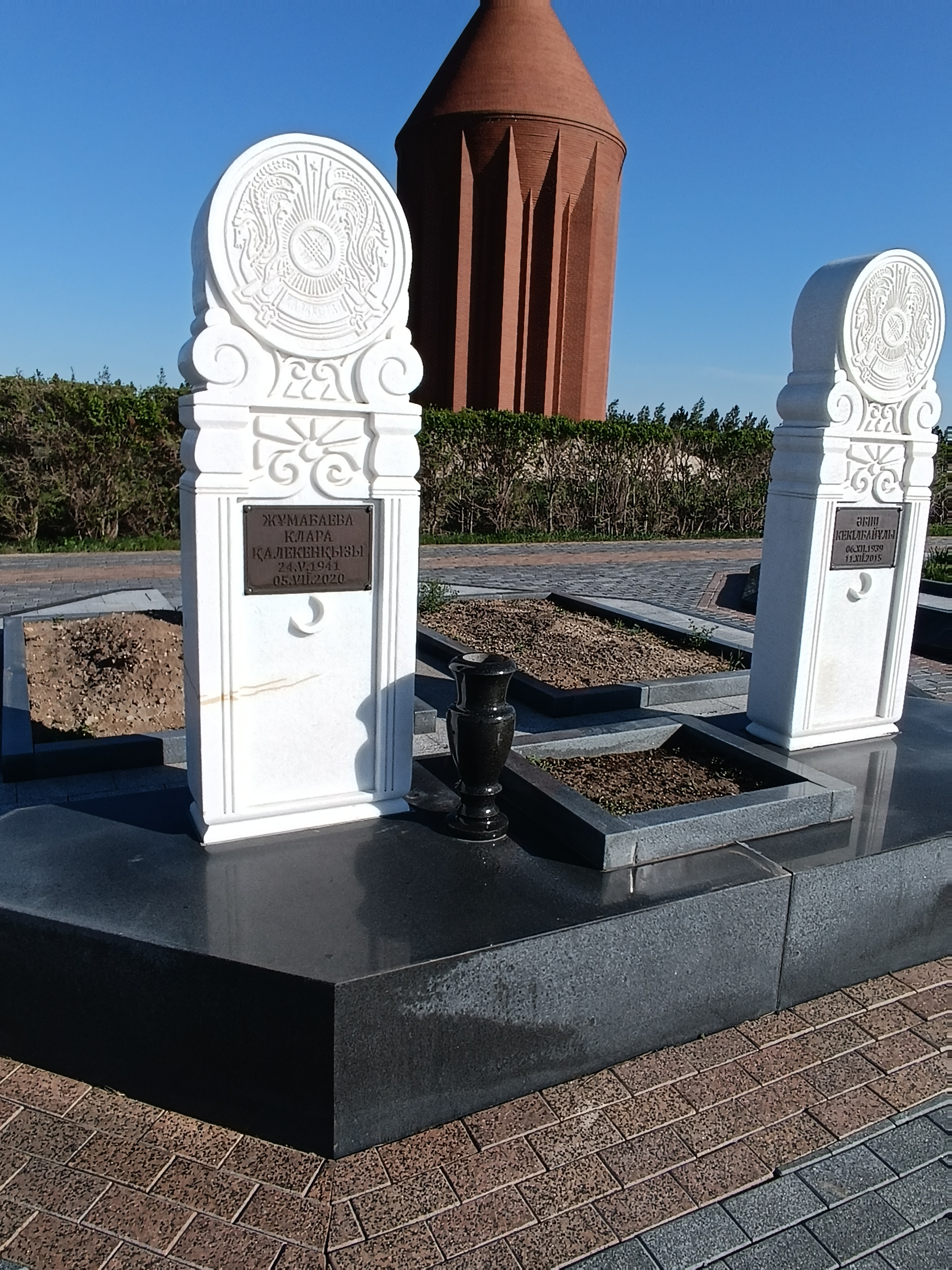
Gravestone of Abish Kekilbayev and his wife

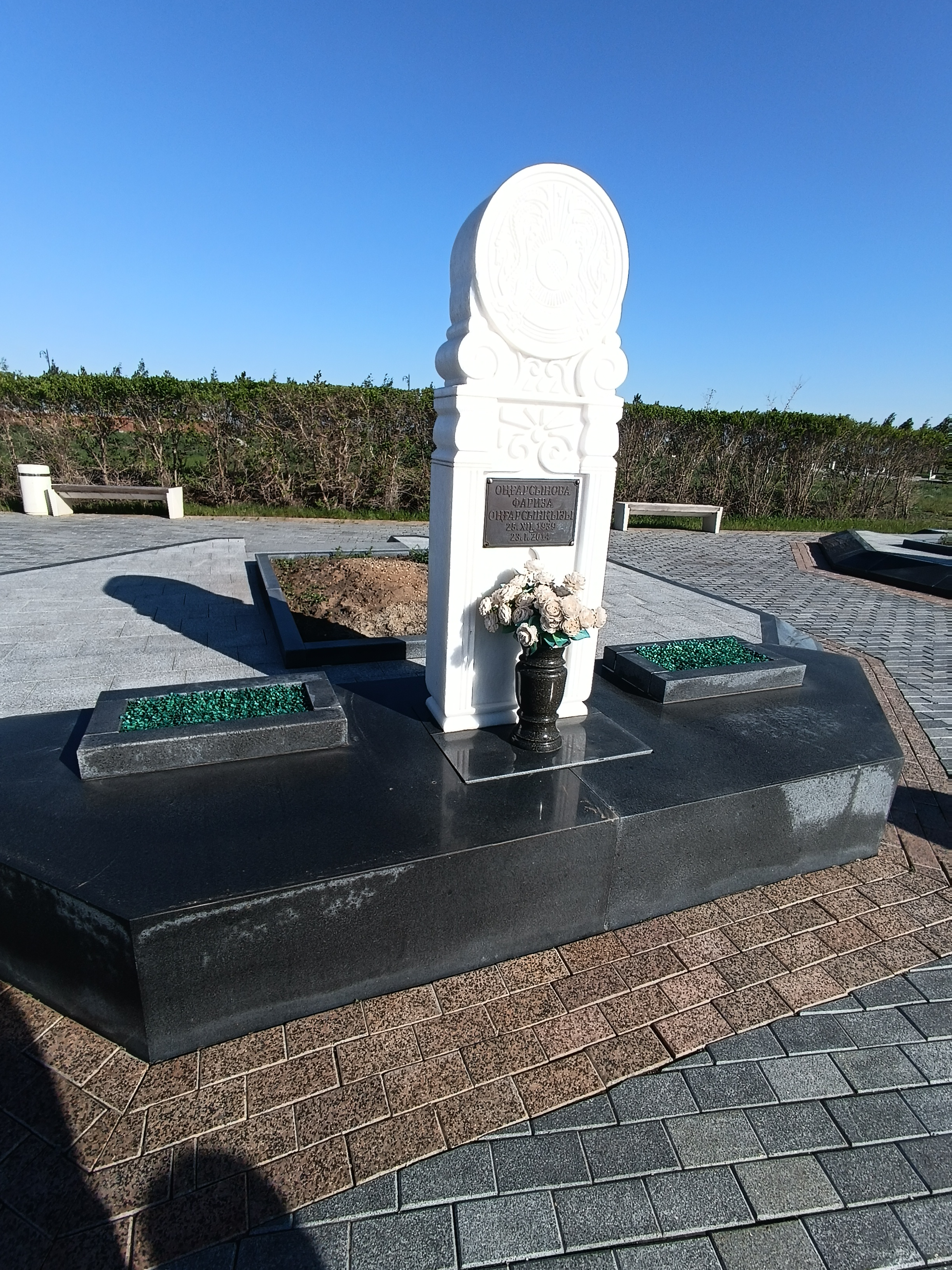
Gravestone of Fariza Ongarsynova

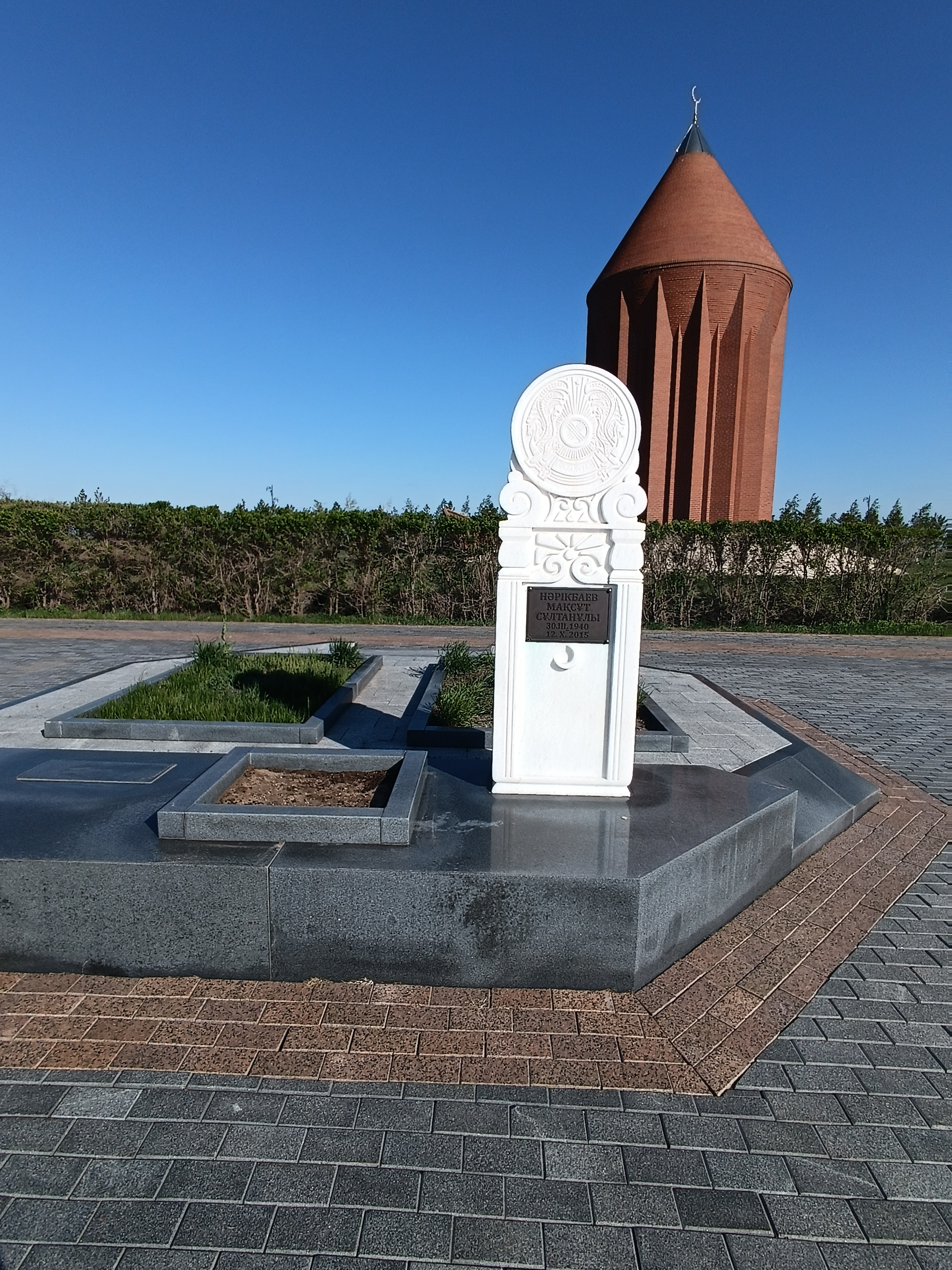
Gravestone of Maksut Narikbaev

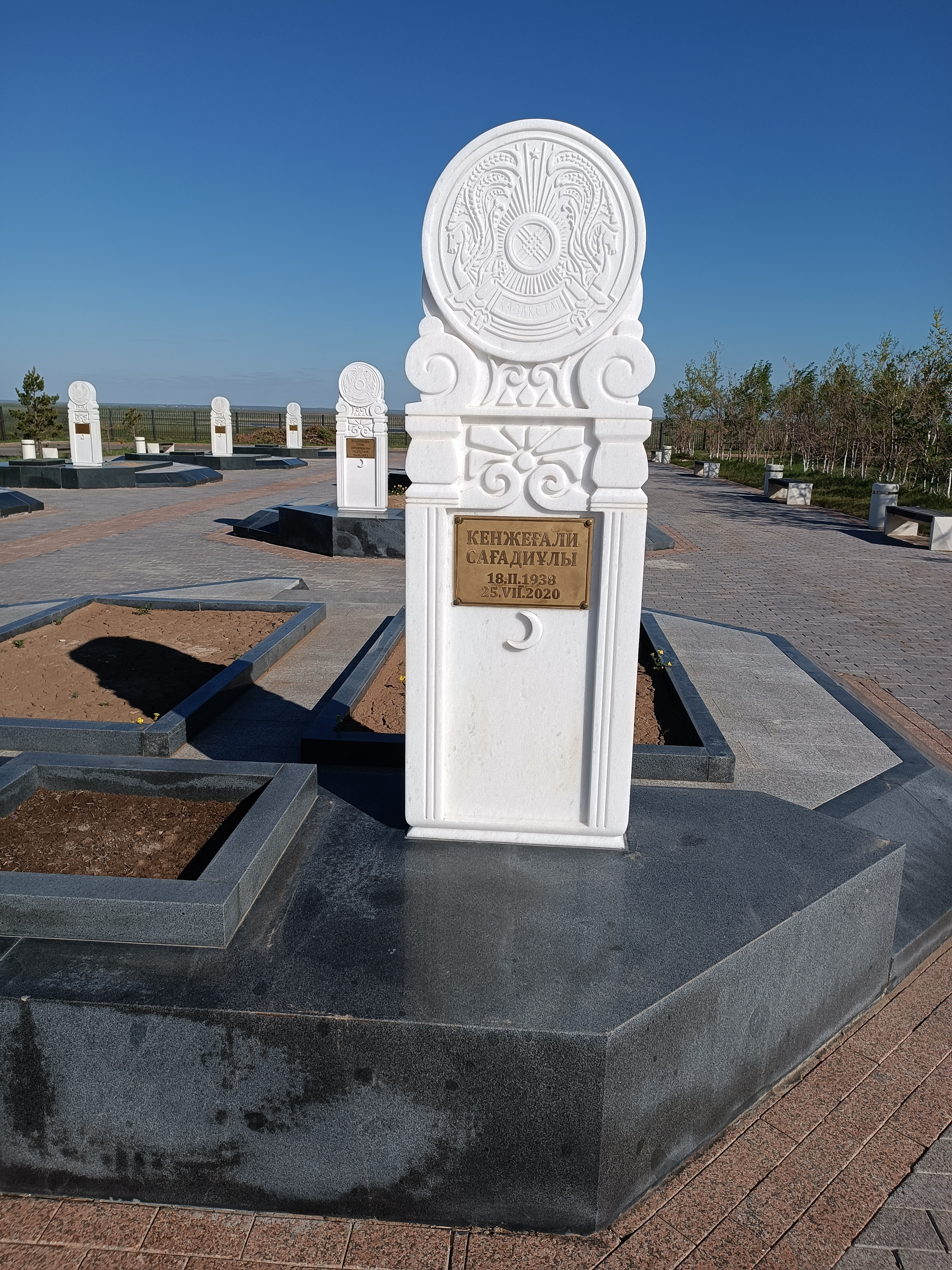
Gravestone of Kenzhegali Sagadiyev

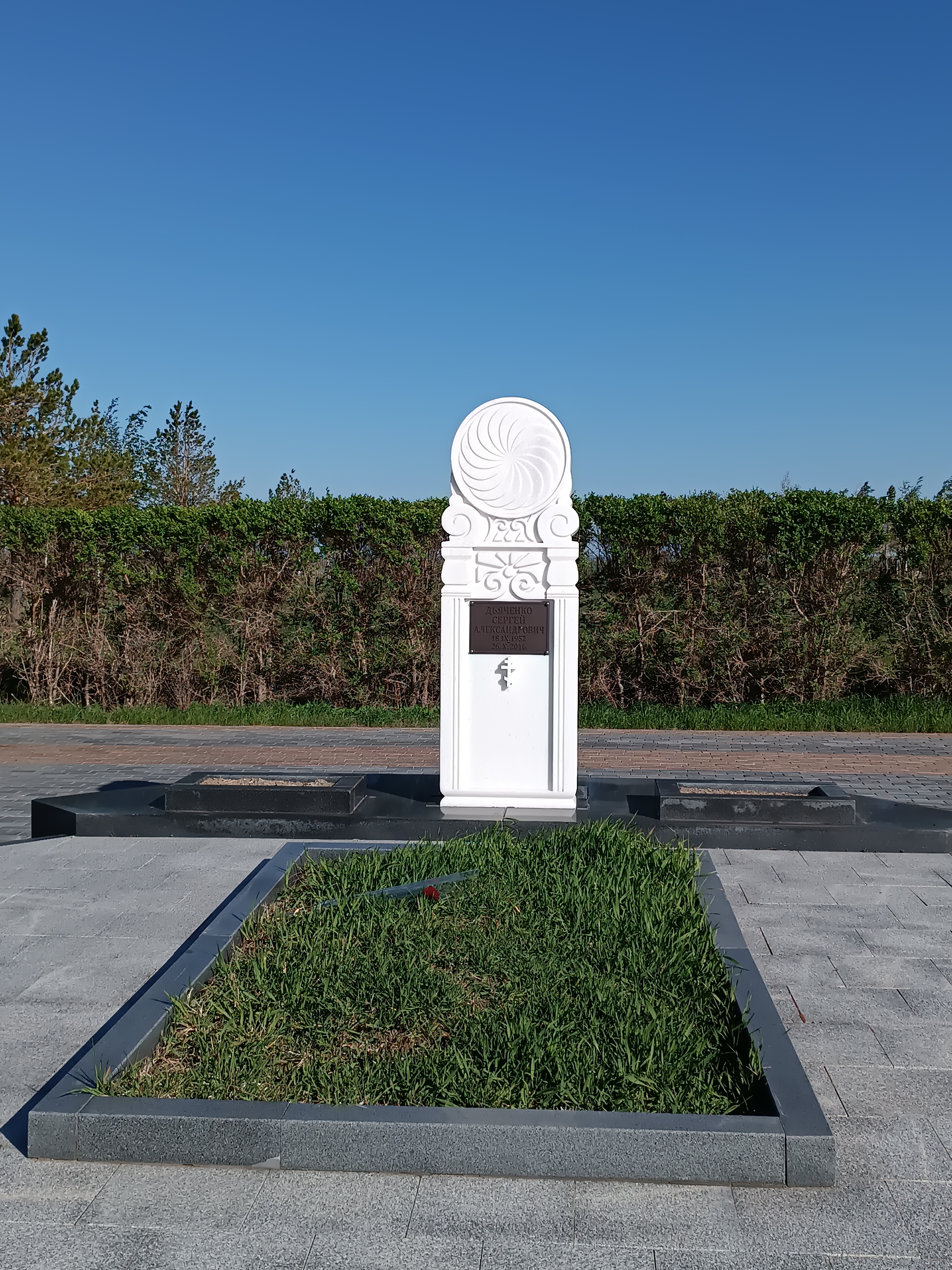
Gravestone of Sergey Dyachenko

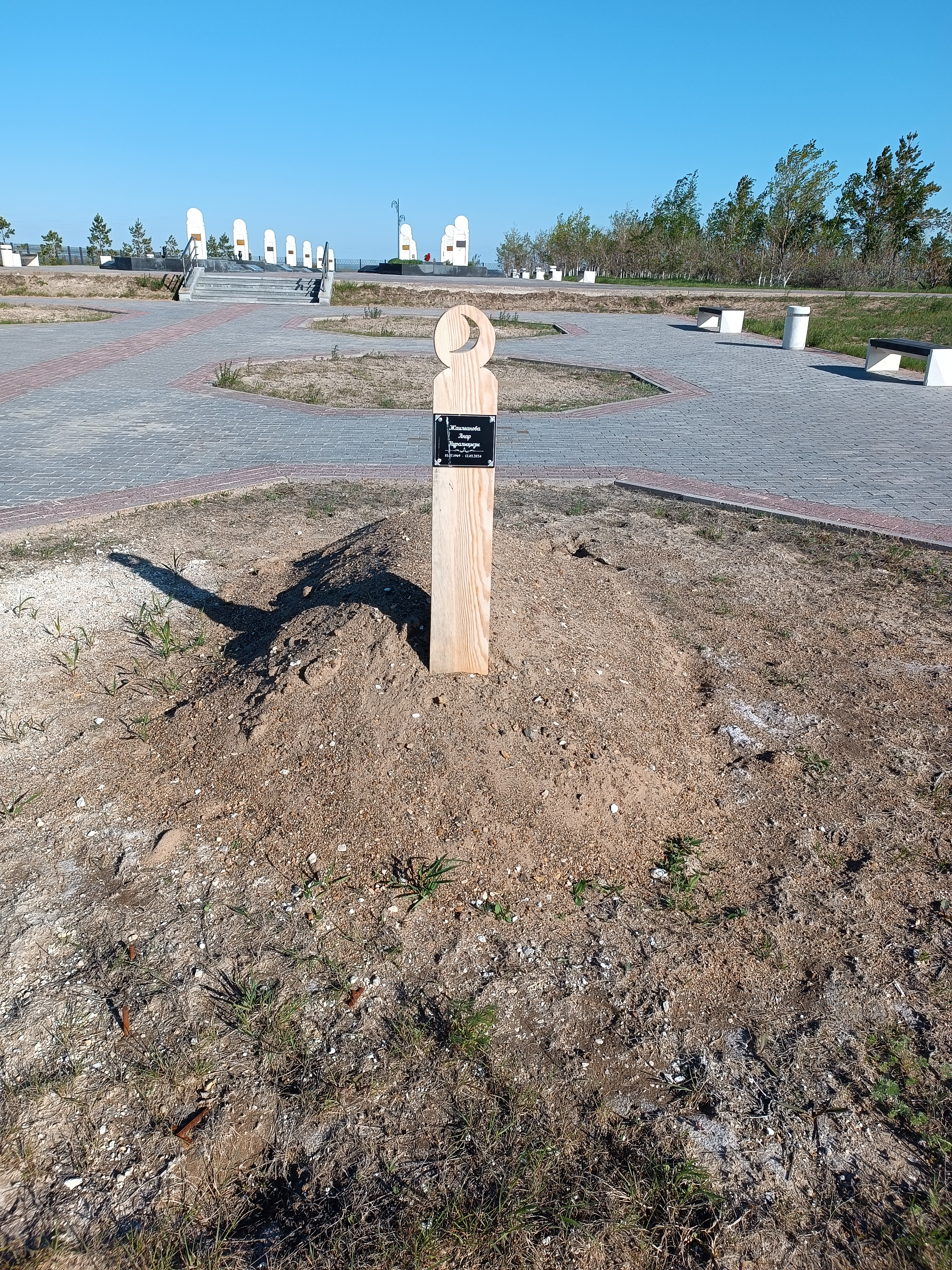
Gravestone of Anar Zhailganova

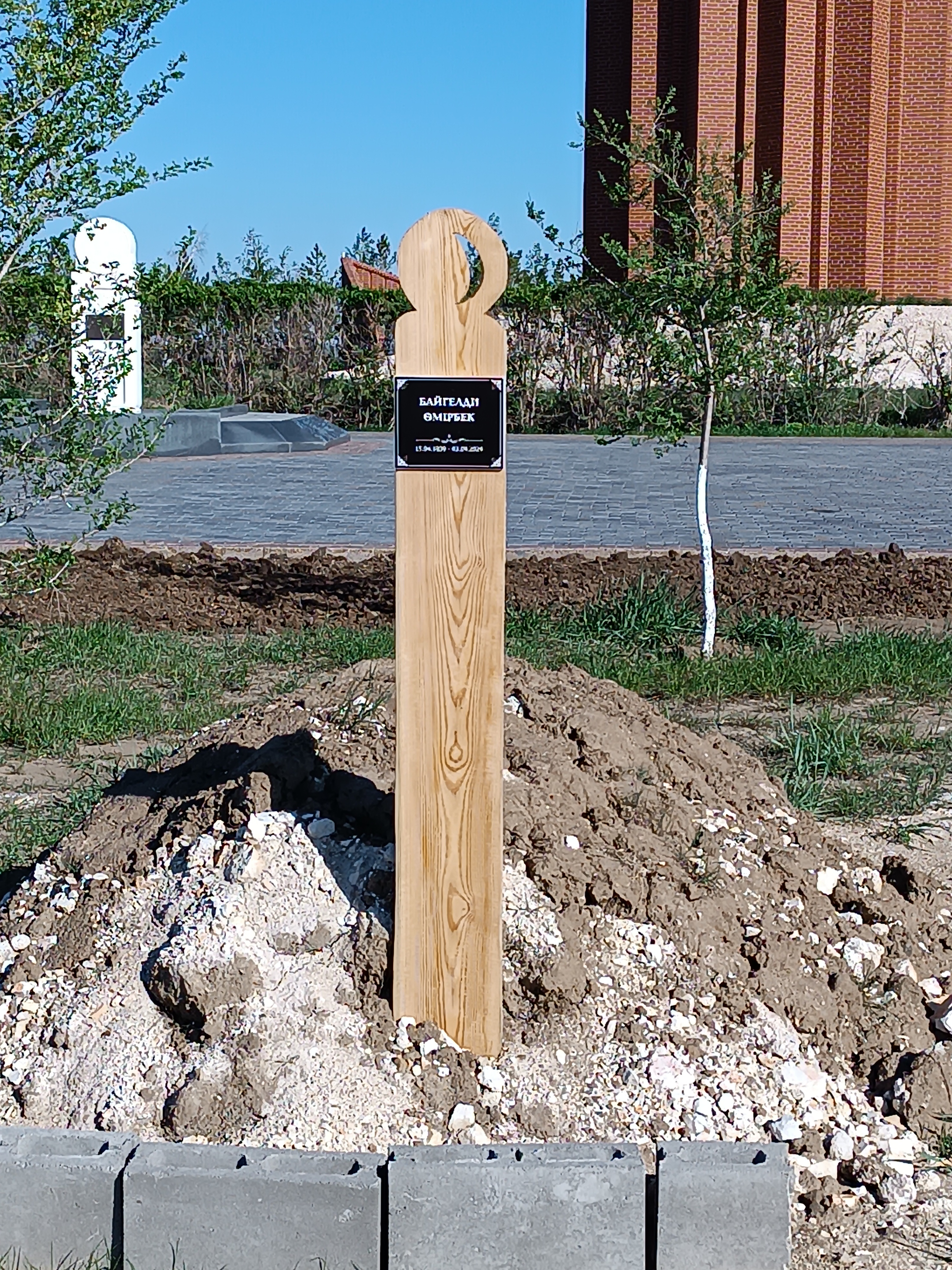
Gravestone of Omirbek Baigeldi
