= Aitmukhambetov =

Aitmukhambetov (masculine, Kazakh: Айтмұхамбетов) or Aitmukhambetova (feminine, Kazakh: Айтмұхамбетова) is a Kazakh surname. Notable people with the surname include:

- Gulnafis Aitmukhambetova (born 1988), Kazakh taekwondo practitioner
- Tamas Aitmukhambetov (born 1939), Kazakh jurist
