= Aslambek =

Aslambek (Russian: Асламбек) is a Russian masculine given name of Turkic origin. It is derived from the words aslan (Russian: Аслан) and bek (Russian: Бек), meaning "lion prince". Notable people with the name include:

- Aslambek Abdulkhadzhiev (1962–2002), Russian military officer
- Aslambek Aslakhanov (1942–2024), Russian military officer
- Aslambek Idigov (born 1995), Russian boxer
- Aslambek Merğaliev (born 1972), Kazakh lawyer
- Aslambek Vadalov (born 1972), Russian military officer

== See also ==
- Aslanbek
- Arslanbek
