= Kenzhegali Sagadiyev =

Kazakhstani politician (1938–2020)

Kenjeğali Sağadiev
- Кенжеғали Сағадиев

President of National Academy of Sciences of the Republic of Kazakhstan
- In office 2 February 1994 – 13 March 1996
- Preceded by: Umirzak Sultangazin
- Succeeded by: Vladimir Shkolnik

Personal details
- Born: 18 February 1938 Zhangeldi District, Kostanay Region, Kazakh SSR, Soviet Union
- Died: 25 July 2020 (aged 82) Astana, Kazakhstan
- Party: Nur Otan
- Education: Al-Farabi Kazakh National University, Plekhanov Russian University of Economics
- Occupation: Professor, Doctor of Economic Sciences
- Awards: Order of Otan; Order of the Leopard; Order of Parasat; Order of the Red Banner of Labour; Order of Friendship of Peoples

Kenjeğali Äbenūly Sağadiev (Note: Often transliterated as Kenzhegali Abenovich Sagadiyev through a Russified Romanization of Кенжегали Абенович Сагадиев.) (Kazakh: Кенжеғали Әбенұлы Сағадиев; 18 February 1938 – 25 July 2020) was a public and political figure in Kazakhstan, an Academician of the National Academy of Sciences of the Republic of Kazakhstan.

== Biography ==
Sağadiev was born in the settlement of Akkol (Zhangeldi District, Kostanay Region) on 18 February 1938. Following graduation from Semiozernoye Kazakh Secondary School, he was admitted to the Dept. of Economics of the Kazakh State University named after Kirov in 1955. Having graduated with honors, Kenzhegali moved to Moscow to enroll in a postgraduate program at the Institute of National Economy named after Plekhanov. Sağadiev defended his doctorate thesis at the age of 39 and had a Doctor of Economics degree bestowed on him by the Presidium of the State Commission for Academic Degrees and Titles of the USSR.

A year later he received the academic title of professor in the field of Economics of Logistics (1978). Sağadiev was elected a corresponding member of the Academy of Sciences of the Kazakh SSR in 1989, and became а full member (academician) of the National Academy of Sciences of the Republic of Kazakhstan in 1994.

Sağadiev led 5 tertiary education institutions in Kazakhstan — Tselinograd Institute of Agriculture (1982—1990), Kazakh University of Economics named after Ryskulov, Kazakh National Agrarian University (1996—2001), University of International Business (2001—2004 and 2012—2016, since 2017 — President Emeritus), and International Information Technology University (2012). In his capacity as a President of the National Academy of Sciences (1994—1996) and Chairman of the National Agency for Technological Development (2012—2014) he made a considerable contribution to the development of Kazakhstani science.

He was elected to the 3rd (2004—2007) and 4th Mäjilis of the Parliament of the Republic of Kazakhstan (2007—2011), served as Chairman of Mäjilis Finance and Budget Committee (2004—2007) and played an important role in the improvement of taxation, financial and budget legislation. During these years, he emphasized the support of science and education as key sectors for human capital development in Kazakhstan.

Kenjeğali Sağadiev established a modern university of business in Almaty, authored over 445 scientific publications, including 20 monographs and a dozen textbooks and manuals. His publications in Kazakhstani newspapers and magazines commanded a lot of attention.

Sağadiev's reputation as an economist was international, he was elected a member of the New York Academy of Sciences and American Economic Association, became an Academician of the Pakistan Academy of Sciences (1997), an Academician of the International Academy of Higher Education (1997). As a member of Nur Otan party, Sağadiev took part in its public initiatives.

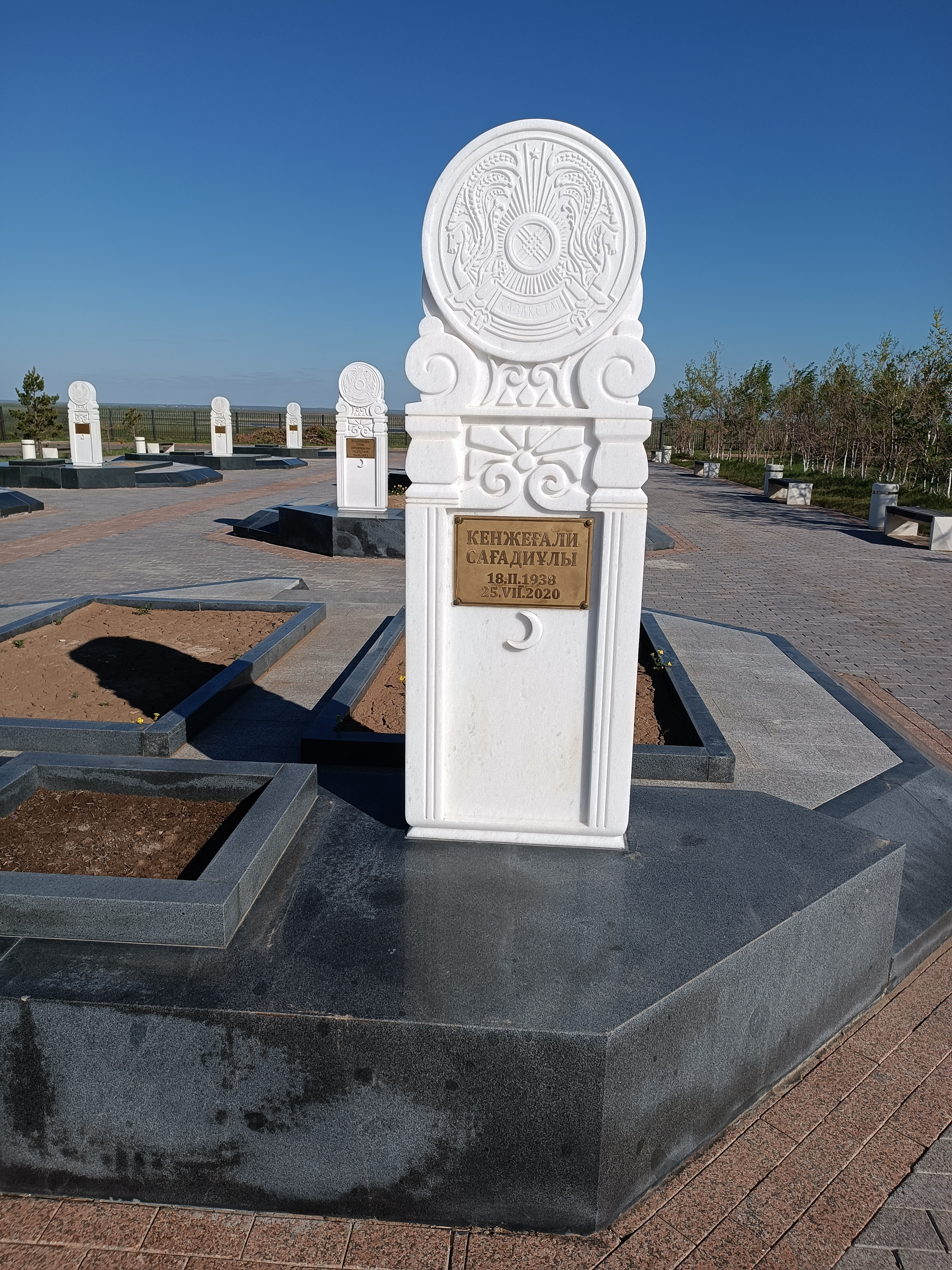
Sağadiev's grave at the National Pantheon of Kazakhstan

Sağadiev died at the age of 81 on July 25, 2020, during the COVID-19 pandemic. He was buried in the National Pantheon of Kazakhstan.

== Family ==
Keznhegali and his wife Nagytai brought up three sons. Their middle son Erlan Sağadiev is a statesman and former Minister of Science and Education of Kazakhstan.

== Awards and titles ==
Sağadiev's orders and medals included:

- Order of the Red Banner of Labour (1971);
- Order of Friendship of Peoples (1987);
- Order of Parasat (2003);
- Order of the Leopard (Kazakhstan) II class (2008);
- Order of the Commonwealth (IPA CIS, 2010);
- Order of Otan (2013);
- Medal "For the Development of Virgin Lands" (1957);
- Jubilee Medal "In Commemoration of the 100th Anniversary of the Birth of Vladimir Ilyich Lenin" (1970);
- Medal 10 years of the Constitution of Kazakhstan (2005);
- Medal of the 10th anniversary of the Parliament (2006).

His honorary titles were:

- Honoured Worker of Science and Technology of Kazakhstan (December 16, 1998);
- Honorary Citizen of the Auliekol District of the Kostanay Region (1996);
- Honorary Citizen of Arkalyk (2007);
- Honorary Citizen of the Amangeldy, Nauyrzym and Zhangeldi Districts of the Kostanay Region (2008);
- Honorary Citizen of the Kostanay Region (2013).

== Legacy ==
- University of International Business (UIB) was established in 1992 to soon become the leading business school in Central Asia; later it was renamed Sağadiev University of International Business.
- A monument to Sağadiev was unveiled in Kostanay near the Big Bridge on the left bank of the Tobol River in 2021, and a commemorative plaque and another monument were unveiled in Almaty on the UIB campus.
