= Aslanbek =

Aslanbek (Russian: Асланбек) is a given name. Notable people with this name include:

- Aslanbek Alborov (born 1991), Azerbaijani wrestler
- Aslanbek Bulatsev (born 1963), Russian politician
- Aslanbek Dzitiyev (born 1982), Russian taekwondo practitioner
- Aslanbek Ediev (born 1970), Russian weightlifter
- Aslanbek Fidarov (1973–2020), Ukrainian wrestler
- Aslanbek Khantsev (born 1960), Russian footballer and coach
- Aslanbek Khushtov (born 1980), Russian wrestler
- Aslanbek Sapiev (born 1993), Russian Paralympic footballer
- Aslanbek Shymbergenov (born 1993), Kazakhstani boxer
- Aslanbek Sikoyev (born 1995), Russian footballer
- Aslanbek Sotiev (born 1999), Russian freestyle wrestler
- Aslanbek Yenaldiev (1947–2015), Russian weightlifter
- Aslanbek Zikreev (born 1995), Russian kickboxer

== See also ==
- Arslanbey, Kartepe
- Aslambek
- Arslanbek
