= Arslanbek =

Arslanbek (Russian: Арсланбек) is a masculine given name. Notable people with the name include:

- Arslanbek Açilow (born 1993), Turkmen boxer
- Arslanbek Makhmudov (born 1989), Russian boxer
- Arslanbek Sultanbekov (born 1965), Russian folk musician and poet

== See also ==
- Aslanbek
- Aslambek
