= Prosecutor General's Office of Kazakhstan =

State Body of Kazakhstan

- Қазақстан Республикасының Бас Прокуратурасы; Qazaqstan Respublikasynyñ Bas Prokuraturasy
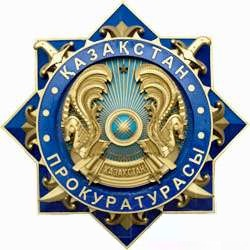

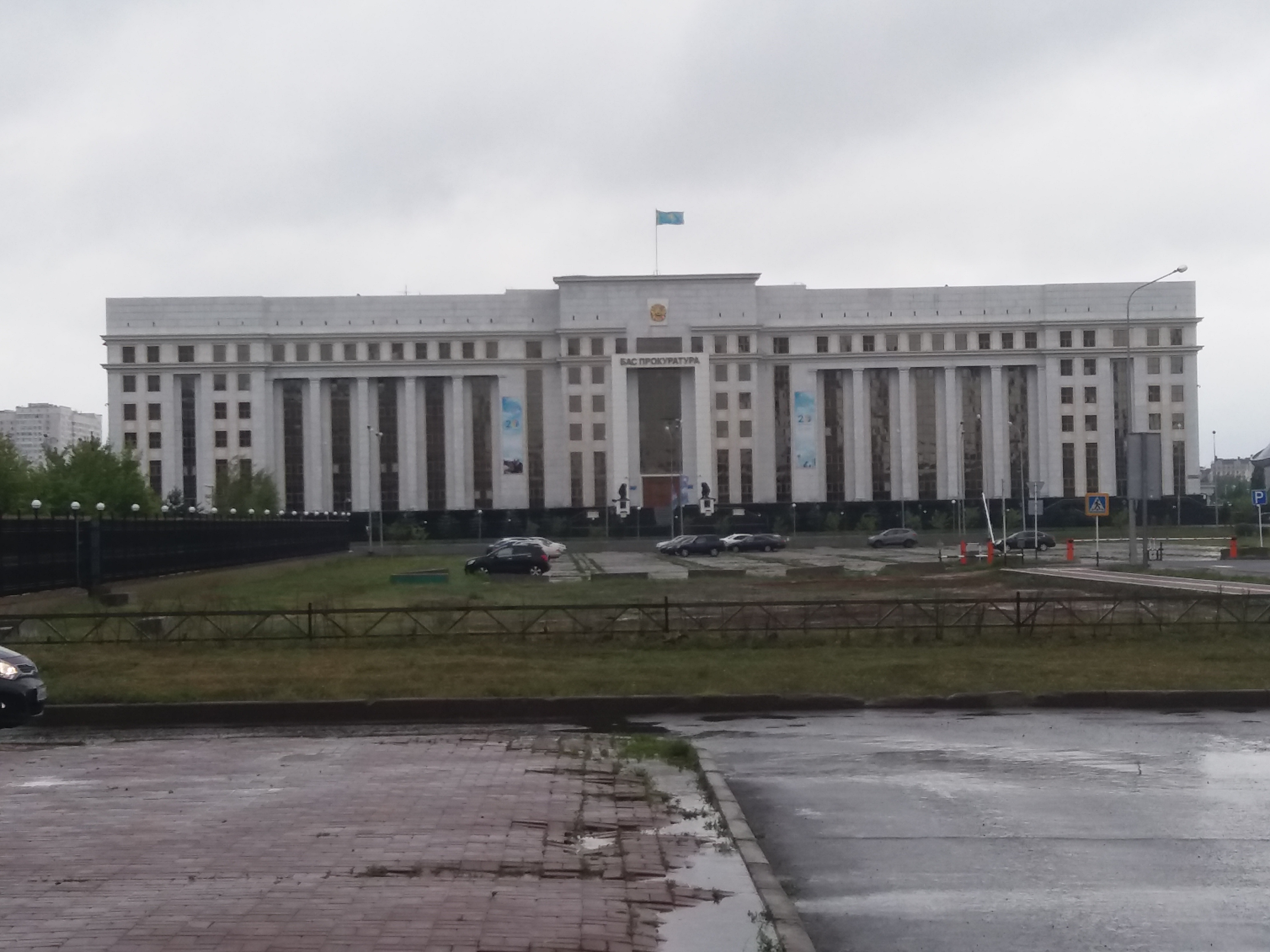
- Prosecutor General's Office headquarters in Astana

Agency overview
- Formed: 13 July 1922; 104 years ago
- Headquarters: Astana, Kazakhstan
- Prosecutor General responsible: Berik Asılov
- Website: prokuror.gov.kz/eng

The Prosecutor General's Office of Kazakhstan (Kazakh: Қазақстан Республикасының Бас Прокуратурасы, romanized: Qazaqstan Respublikasynyñ Bas Prokuraturasy) is a state body accountable to the President of Kazakhstan, exercising supreme supervision over the precise and uniform application of laws, decrees of the President of the Republic of Kazakhstan and other regulatory legal acts on the territory of the Republic, over the legality of operational-search activities, inquiry and investigation, administrative and enforcement proceedings.

== History ==
On 13 July 1922, at the 2nd convocation of the 3rd session of the KazCEC, the State Prosecutor's Office was organized in the structure of the People's Commissariat of Justice. The People's Commissar of Justice served as the prosecutor of the republic.

In 1933, under the People's Commissariat of Justice, the Office of the Prosecutor's Office was formed, which became relatively independent. For the first time in its history, the functions of the prosecutor and the People's Commissar of Justice were separated.

In 1937, the Constitution of the Kazakh SSR was adopted. From that moment, the stage of further development and strengthening of the Prosecutor's Office began, which completely separated from the People's Commissariat of Justice in November 1937 according to the order and began to function as an independent structure of the republic's law enforcement agencies.

After Kazakhstan gained independence in 1991, the Prosecutor's Office played a huge role in the formation of the country's statehood.
