= Igor Rogov =

Kazakhstani lawyer

- Игорь Рогов
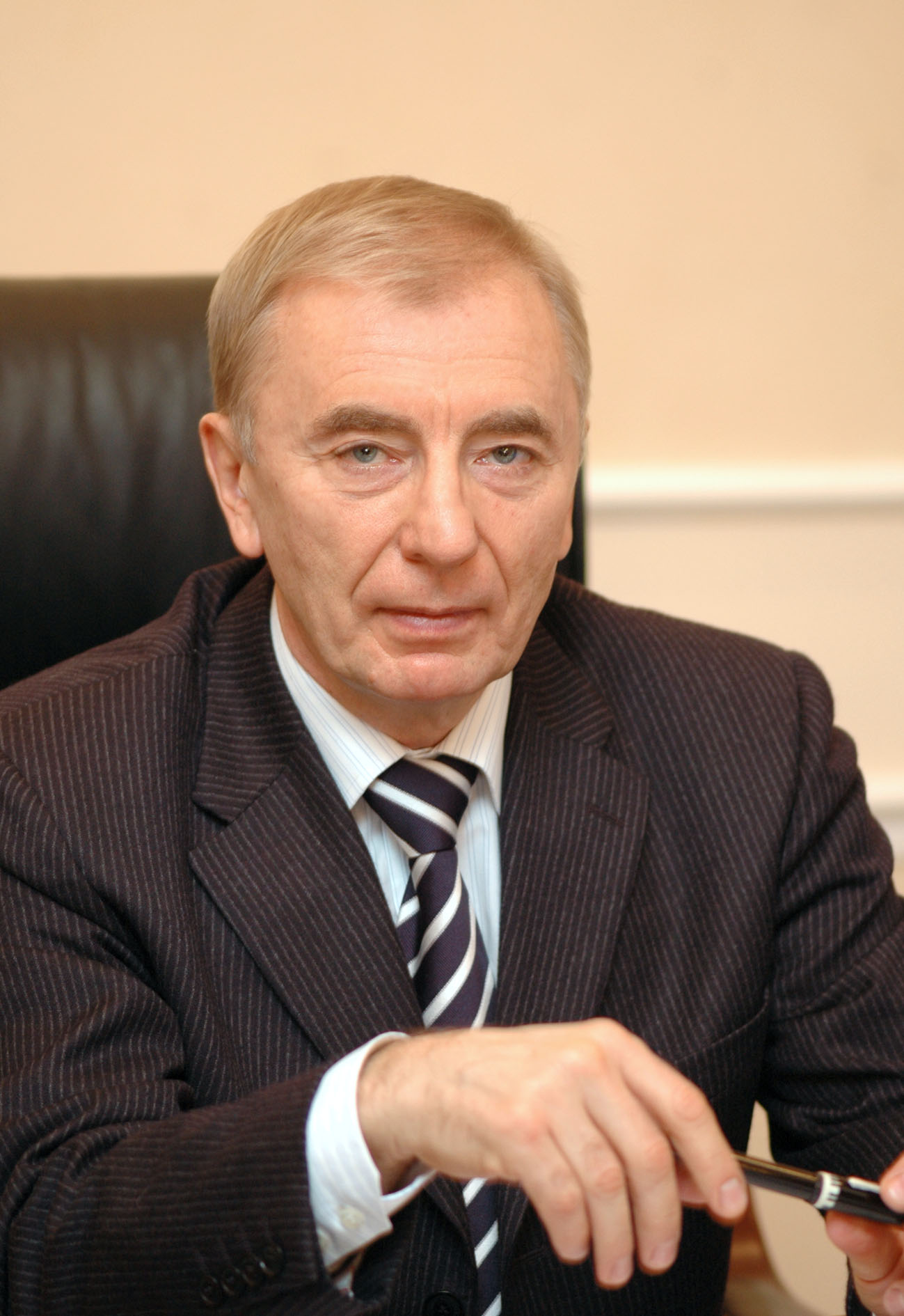
- Rogov in 2008

Chairman of the Constitutional Council
- In office 15 June 2004 – 11 December 2017
- President: Nursultan Nazarbayev
- Preceded by: Yuri Khitrin
- Succeeded by: Kairat Mami

Minister of Justice
- In office 13 December 2000 – 29 January 2002
- President: Nursultan Nazarbayev
- Prime Minister: Imangali Tasmagambetov; Kassym-Jomart Tokayev
- Preceded by: Bauyrzhan Mukhamedzhanov
- Succeeded by: Georgy Kim

Personal details
- Born: 17 May 1950 (age 76) Baku, Azerbaijan SSR, Soviet Union
- Education: Al-Farabi Kazakh National University

Igor Ivanovich Rogov (Kazakh and Russian: Игорь Иванович Рогов; born 17 May 1950) is a Kazakh lawyer, former Minister of Justice of Kazakhstan and former Chairman of the Constitutional Council of Kazakhstan. Born in Baku, Rogov is of Russian descent and has degrees in jurisprudence and criminology. He has worked in academia. In 2000, he became the Minister of Justice for Kazakhstan, the position he held until 2002.
