= Mikhail Malakhov (jurist) =

Kazakhstani jurist (born 1946)

- Михаил Малахов

2nd Chairman of the Supreme Court of Kazakhstan
- In office 1993–1996
- Preceded by: Tamas Aitmukhambetov
- Succeeded by: Maksut Narikbaev

Personal details
- Born: 13 November 1946 (age 79) Kuybyshev, Kazakh SSR, Soviet Union
- Children: Dmitry Malakhov
- Profession: Jurist; politician

Mikhail Fedorovich Malakhov (Russian: Михаил Фёдорович Малахов; born 13 November 1946) is a Kazakh jurist, who served as the second Chairman of the Supreme Court of Kazakhstan.
