= Financial Monitoring Agency =

Government agency of Kazakhstan

Coordinates: 51°10′06″N 71°25′17″E

Financial Monitoring Agency of the Republic of Kazakhstan
- Қазақстан Республикасы Қаржылық мониторинг агенттігі (Kazakh); Агентство Республики Казахстан по финансовому мониторингу (Russian)
- Emblem of Kazakhstan

Agency overview
- Formed: January 28, 2021
- Preceding agency: Financial Monitoring Committee of the Finance ministry
- Headquarters: 10, Beibitshilik Street, Astana
- Chairman responsible: Janat Elimanov
- Website: www.gov.kz/memleket/entities/afm?lang=en

The Financial Monitoring Agency of the Republic of Kazakhstan (AFM; Kazakh: Қазақстан Республикасы Қаржылық мониторинг агенттігі; Russian: Агентство Республики Казахстан по финансовому мониторингу) established in 2021 and directly accountable to the president of Kazakhstan, is a state law‑enforcement body responsible for preventing, detecting, and investigating economic and financial crimes, and for combating money laundering and the financing of terrorism of Kazakhstan.

== List of chairs ==
=== Chairpersons of Financial Monitoring Committee of the Finance ministry ===
- Müsiräli Ötebaev (2008–2014)
- Bisenğali Täjiaqov (2014–2016)
- Berik Sholpanqulov (2016)
- Änuar Jumadildaev (2017–2019)
- Äbılqaiyr Sqaqov (2019–2020)
- Janat Elimanov (2020–2021)

=== Chairpersons of Financial Monitoring Agency ===
- Janat Elimanov (2021–2024)
- Dmitry Malakhov (2024)
- Janat Elimanov (since 2024)

== History ==
On April 24, 2008, by prime minister of Kazakhstan Karim Massimov's decree No. 387, the Financial Monitoring Committee was established within the Finance ministry.

In August 2014, when the Agency for Combating Economic and Corruption Crimes underwent reorganization, its functions for investigating economic crimes were transferred to the Economic Investigations Service, which was created within the State Revenues Committee of the Finance ministry on November 7, of the same year. On December 29, 2018, the Economic Investigations Service was transferred to the Financial Monitoring Committee.

On January 28, 2021, by president Kassym-Jomart Tokayev's decree established the Financial Monitoring Agency, subordinated to the president, and transferred to it the Finance ministry's functions and powers for countering the legalization of proceeds of crime and the financing of terrorism, as well as for preventing, detecting, suppressing, uncovering, and investigating economic and financial crimes and offenses. The same decree abolished the Financial Monitoring Committee.

== Function ==
=== Tasks ===
- Coordinating measures to prevent, detect, and suppress the legalization (laundering) of criminally obtained proceeds and the financing of terrorism.
- Detecting and disrupting financial and economic offenses, including shadow economy activities, tax evasion, and illicit financial flows.
- Identifying, tracing, and returning assets obtained through criminal activities.

=== Powers and Duties ===
- Receiving, analyzing, and processing reports on suspicious transactions or threshold amounts from financial institutions and other reporting entities.
- Conducting pre-trial investigations and inquiries into economic and financial crimes as defined by the Criminal Procedure Code of Kazakhstan.
- Creating and utilizing specialized databases to analyze monetary and asset transactions for actionable intelligence.
- Collaborating with domestic law enforcement, international financial intelligence units (FIUs), and global organizations to combat transnational financial crimes.

=== Rights ===
- Demanding and obtaining necessary documents, data, and explanations from individuals, legal entities, and state bodies in the course of investigations.
- Freezing assets, suspending transactions, and applying other preventive measures to curb illicit financial activities.
- Inspecting compliance with anti-money laundering and counter-terrorist financing (AML/CFT) regulations among designated financial monitoring entities.
