= Merchant Shamsutdinov's Trading house, Petropavl =

- Торговый дом купца Шамсутдинова
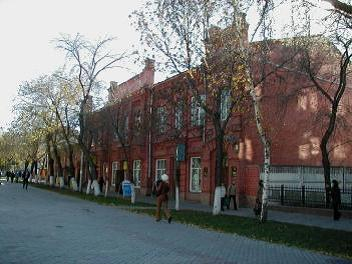

General information
- Status: Monument of Culture
- Location: Petropavl
- Country: Kazakhstan
- Completed: 1904

Design and construction
- Architect(s): Baroque

The Merchant Shamsutdinov's Trading House is a building in Petropavl, North Kazakhstan Region. It is located on Constitution Street. Built in 1904 as a commercial building, it is now preserved as part of the cultural heritage.

== History ==
The building was built by the businessman M.K. Shamsutdinov. Later it was occupied by a partnership, Nazmetdinova and Co. In the first years of Soviet power, this building was occupied by a paid outpatient clinic, then, on the first floor, by a city pharmacy. The second floor for many years was occupied by the Petropavlovsk city committee of the Communist Party of Kazakhstan and the North-Kazakhstan Regional Committee of the Young Communist League of Kazakhstan.

== Architecture ==
This monument is a two-story brick building, rectangular in plan. At the second floor there is a wide wooden front staircase by the wall. The main facade is decorated with figural elements of brickwork and parapet walls, completed with brick columns. In the interior of the second floor there are noteworthy arched door openings in the corridor. The foundations are brick band. The floors are wooden and have been insulated. The roof is made with drain pipes.

The building is an example of historical design of provincial commercial premises. It is a typical city building of the nineteenth and twentieth century, expressed in the planned integrated brick construction for business and trade purposes, and is part of the architectural heritage of the city.

== Documents ==
Materials relating to the building are stored by the North Kazakhstan State Archive and the Real Estate Center for the North-Kazakhstan region of the Registration Service of the Kazakhstan Ministry of Justice. The building was taken under protection by the decision of the Regional Executive Committee (No. 478 of 11/11/79)

== Literature ==
- Газета «Мир труда», 1922 г. 6 мая.
- ГАСКО. Ф. 158 « Личный фонд Бенюха М. И.».
- Морозов М. А. Петропавловск в дореволюционных литературных источниках. Л. 1991.
- Северо-Казахстанская область. Энциклопедия. Алматы. 2004. С. 546.
