= Kazakh presidential line of succession =

Order of assuming powers of Kazakh presidency

The Kazakh presidential line of succession is defined by the Constitution of the Republic of Kazakhstan and supplementary legislation. It establishes the order to be followed in the event that the President of Kazakhstan is unable to discharge the duties of office due to death, resignation, removal, or incapacity.

According to Article 48 of the Constitution, in such circumstances the powers of the President are transferred to the Chairman of the Senate of the Parliament until a new President is elected. If the Chairman of the Senate is unable to assume the office, the powers are passed to the Chairman of the Mäjilis (lower house of Parliament), and, in the final instance, to the Prime Minister of Kazakhstan.

== Constitutional basis ==
The legal framework for presidential succession is contained in:

- Constitution of the Republic of Kazakhstan (1995), Article 48.
- Related laws regulating the status of Parliament and the Government.

Article 48, Paragraph 1 states:

In case of early termination of the President's powers, his death, resignation, incapacity or removal from office, the powers of the President of the Republic shall be transferred to the Chairman of the Senate of the Parliament. In the case of the inability of the Chairman of the Senate to assume these powers, they shall be transferred to the Chairman of the Majilis of the Parliament. In the case of the inability of the latter, the powers shall be transferred to the Prime Minister of the Republic of Kazakhstan.

== Current order of succession ==
No.	Office	Incumbent	Party
1	Chairman of the Senate of Kazakhstan	Mäulen Äşimbaev	Amanat
2	Chairman of the Mäjilis	Erlan Qoşanov	Amanat
3	Prime Minister of Kazakhstan	Oljas Bektenov	Amanat

== History ==
The institution of presidential succession in Kazakhstan has undergone several stages of development since the establishment of the office in April 1990, when the Presidency of the Kazakh SSR was created. At that time, in accordance with the Chapter 12-1, Article 114-8 of the Constitution of the Kazakh SSR, the powers of the head of state in case of vacancy were to be transferred to the Vice President of Kazakhstan, and if that post was absent or unable, then to the Chairman of the Supreme Soviet of the Kazakh SSR. This arrangement remained in force during the first period of statehood after independence, with the adoption of the 1993 Constitution of Kazakhstan largely preserving the same procedure, though it additionally required that snap presidential elections be conducted within two months, while the acting head of state temporarily exercised presidential authority.

A more systematic approach appeared with the adoption of the 1995 Constitution of Kazakhstan, approved by national referendum on 30 August 1995 and entering into force on 5 September 1995 under Presidential Decree No. 2454, which for the first time set out in detail the order of succession. It was defined that in the event of early termination of presidential powers, they would be assumed by the Chairman of the Senate of Parliament, and if that office was not available, then by the Chairman of the Mäjilis, followed by the Prime Minister of Kazakhstan.

Beyond the constitutional provisions, Kazakhstan has maintained a formal protocol hierarchy of officials, which determines ceremonial precedence at state and international events. The Protocol Seniority of Officials of the Republic of Kazakhstan during Domestic and International Events, issued by presidential decree in 2006, listed the relative ranking of key officials, including the First President, the head of the Presidential Administration, parliamentary leaders, and other senior government figures. While this list does not affect constitutional succession, it provides insight into the practical political hierarchy and the prominence of various offices within the state apparatus. In 2025, President Kassym-Jomart Tokayev issued amendments to the protocol, updating certain positions, reordering specific offices, and adjusting ceremonial precedence such as removing the First President and certain top offices.

== Application ==
The succession provision has been invoked once in Kazakhstan's history. In March 2019, following the resignation of long-serving President Nursultan Nazarbayev, the office of president was assumed by Kassym-Jomart Tokayev, then Chairman of the Senate. Tokayev subsequently called a snap presidential election, which he won in June 2019.

No other instances of succession under Article 48 have occurred.

=== Presidential succession by acting presidents ===
Successor	Party	President	Reason	Date of succession
Kassym-Jomart Tokayev	Nur Otan	Nursultan Nazarbayev	Resignation	20 March 2019, 27 years, 3 months and 3 days into Nazarbayev's presidency.

== See also ==
- President of Kazakhstan
- Acting President of Kazakhstan
- Presidential line of succession
