= Tamas Aitmukhambetov =

Kazakh jurist (born 1939)

- Тамас Айтмұхамбетов

1st Chairman of the Supreme Court of Kazakhstan
- In office 1992–1993
- Preceded by: Position established
- Succeeded by: Mikhail Makalov

Personal details
- Born: 13 December 1939 (age 86) Krasnoyarsky District, Astrakhan Oblast, Russian SFSR, Soviet Union
- Profession: Jurist

Tamas Qalmūhambetūly Aitmūhambetov (Note: Often transliterated as Tamas Kalmukhambetovich Aitmukhambetov through a Russified Romanization of Тамас Калмухамбетович Айтмухамбетов.) (Kazakh: Тамас Қалмұхамбетұлы Айтмұхамбетов; born 13 December 1939) is a Russian-born Kazakh jurist who served as the first Chairman of the Supreme Court of Kazakhstan from 1992 to 1993.
