= Prosecutor General of Kazakhstan =

- Қазақстан Бас прокуроры (Kazakh)
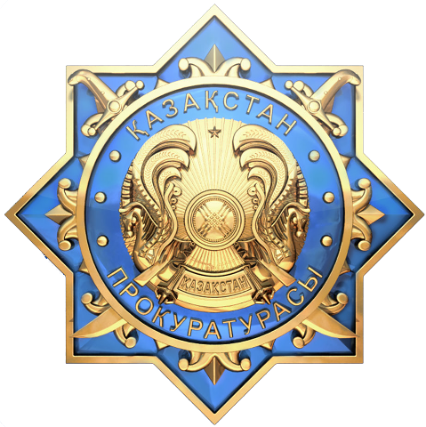
- Emblem of the Prosecutor General's Office

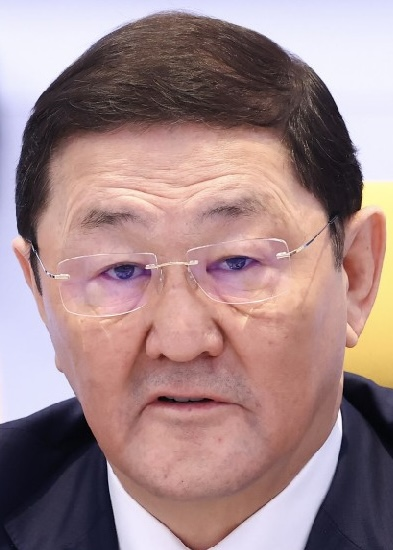
- Incumbent; Berik Asılov since 3 March 2022
- Prosecutor General's Office of Kazakhstan
- Type: Public procurator
- Member of: Security Council of Kazakhstan
- Reports to: President
- Appointer: The president
- Term length: Six years
- Formation: 7 December 1990
- First holder: Zharmakhan Tuyakbay
- Website: www.gov.kz

The General Prosecutor of Kazakhstan (Kazakh: Қазақстан Бас прокуроры, romanized: Qazaqstan Bas prokwrorı) is the highest-ranking position in Kazakhstan's prosecutorial system, overseeing the enforcement of legality throughout the country.

== List of prosecutors general ==
No.	Portrait	Name	Start	End	Source
1		Zharmakhan Tuyakbay	7 December 1990	6 October 1995	
2		Maqsūt Närıkbaev	6 October 1995	1996	
3		Stepan Shutkin	1996	1997	
4		Yurii Khitrin	1997	21 December 2000	
5		Rashid Tusupbekov	21 December 2000	9 April 2009	
6		Qairat Mämi	9 April 2009	15 April 2011	
7		Asqat Dauylbaev	15 April 2011	25 April 2016	
8		Jaqyp Asanov	25 April 2016	11 December 2017	
9		Qairat Qojamjarov	11 December 2017	18 March 2019	
10		Ğïzat Nurdäwletov	18 March 2019	3 March 2022	
11		Berik Asılov	3 March 2022	Incumbent	

== Functions ==
- within the limits of the prosecutorial staff quota approved by the President, determines the number of prosecutors and other employees;
- proposes to the President the rules of operation of the General Prosecutor's Office, its structure, and the total number of prosecutorial personnel;
- proposes to the President the appointment or dismissal of the head of the central apparatus of the Prosecutor General's Office;
- with the consent of the President, appoints and dismisses the head of the prosecutorial educational institution, the Chief Military Prosecutor, the Chief Transport Prosecutor, as well as prosecutors of regions and equivalent entities (cities of republican significance and the capital);
- proposes state awards and honorary titles for prosecutors, employees, and retirees of the prosecution service, and also awards them with departmental awards;
- determines positions for employees of ordinary, junior, middle, senior, and senior command staff of the prosecution service, as well as corresponding special ranks and class ranks;
- establishes the procedure, stages, and timelines for unscheduled attestation of prosecution service employees;
- determines the procedure and methods for assessing professional competencies, key performance indicators, and calculation of the digital rating of candidates for service;
- jointly with the heads of law enforcement agencies, approves the procedure and methods for conducting psychological and sociological research.
- directs the activities of all prosecutor's offices in the country;
- within the frameworks and forms provided by law, exercises supreme supervision over compliance with laws throughout the territory of Kazakhstan;
- reports to the President on the state of lawfulness in the country and the work of the prosecution service;
- chairs the Council for the Maintenance of Legality, Law and Order, and the Fight Against Crime in Kazakhstan;
- approves the regulations for the operation of councils at the chief military and transport prosecutor's offices, regional prosecutor's offices and equivalent entities (cities of republican significance and the capital);
- delegates part of his powers to prosecution service employees, except for those fixed to him by laws and presidential decrees;
- forms expert councils and working groups in the General Prosecutor's Office, determines their composition and rules of operation;
- approves the structure of the central apparatus, educational institution, military and transport prosecutor's offices, regional prosecutor's offices and equivalent entities (cities of republican significance and the capital), district and equivalent prosecutor's offices (city, inter-district, specialized), as well as state institutions and other organizations of the prosecution service;
- approves the charters (regulations) of state institutions and the prosecutorial educational institution, except for those approved by the President;
- issues mandatory orders, instructions, regulations, guidelines, and other acts for prosecutors and employees on the organization and conduct of prosecutorial work;
- within the forms and frameworks specified by law, exercises supreme supervision over compliance with laws throughout Kazakhstan;
- applies to the Constitutional Court;
- challenges judicial acts that have entered into force and contradict the Constitution or laws of Kazakhstan;
- applies to the Supreme Court for clarifications on judicial practice in civil, criminal, administrative cases, and administrative offense proceedings;
- suspends the execution of judicial acts in the manner established by the procedural legislation of Kazakhstan;
- submits representations for depriving immunity and bringing to responsibility (administrative or criminal) persons who have such right under the Constitution and laws;
- in cases provided by law, coordinates documents on pre-trial investigation, operational-search activities, counterintelligence, and covert investigative actions;
- in case of violation of the law, deprives the member of Parliament of his immunity;
- issues acts on matters of receiving complaints and personal reception of citizens and representatives of organizations in prosecutor's offices (in the part not regulated by laws on administrative procedures and judicial proceedings); inspections of law compliance, analysis of legality, assessment of decisions that have entered into force; organization of pre-trial investigation in prosecutor's offices; application of criminal procedure rules and operational-search activities; legal statistics and special records; collection, processing, storage, protection, and destruction of information in exchanges between police, special services, and other agencies; appointment and dismissal of prosecutors and employees (except those appointed by the President or with his consent and that of the Presidential Administration); remuneration, benefits, and other payments; organization and coordination of joint scientific research on law protection, their examination; enrollment in the prosecutorial educational institution; other matters provided for by this Constitutional Law, other laws of Kazakhstan, and presidential decrees.

== Immunity ==
The Prosecutor General cannot be detained, arrested, brought to court, fined, or prosecuted without presidential consent, except at the crime scene or for grave offenses.

== Nomination ==
The Prosecutor General is appointed by the President for a six-year term, with no person eligible for reappointment.

== In Parliament ==
The Prosecutor General may attend any sittings of Parliament and be heard.
