= Presidential line of succession =

Presidential line of succession may refer to:

- Argentine presidential line of succession
- Brazilian presidential line of succession
- Colombian presidential line of succession
- Dominican presidential line of succession
- Nigerian presidential line of succession
- Pakistani presidential line of succession
- Philippine presidential line of succession
- Sri Lankan presidential line of succession
- United States presidential line of succession
- Uruguayan presidential line of succession
