= Berik Assylov =

Kazakh lawyer and politician

- Берік Асылов
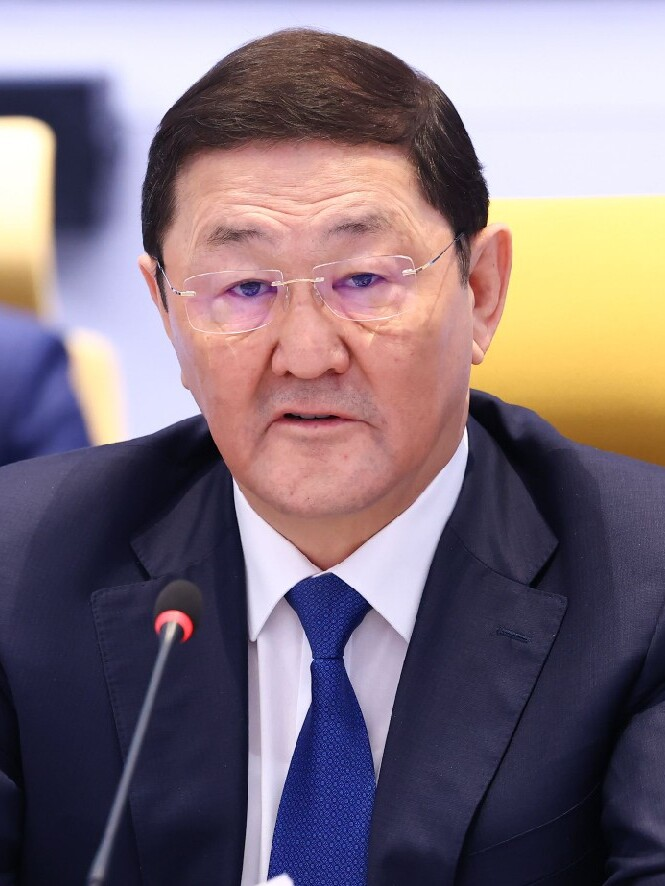
- Assylov in 2026

Prosecutor General of Kazakhstan
- Incumbent
- Assumed office 3 March 2022
- President: Kassym-Jomart Tokayev
- Preceded by: Ğizat Nurdäuletov

Personal details
- Born: 28 February 1964 (age 62) Birlik, Moiynkum District, Jambyl Region, Kazakh SSR, Soviet Union
- Education: Kazakh State University
- Occupation: Lawyer

Berik Noğaiūly Assylov (Note: Often transliterated as Berik Nogaiuly Asylov through a Russified Romanization of Берик Ногайулы Асылов.) (Kazakh: Берік Ноғайұлы Асылов, born 28 February 1964) is a Kazakh lawyer and statesman who currently serves as the Prosecutor General of Kazakhstan since 2022.

== Early life and education ==
Berik Noğaiūly Assylov was born on 28 February 1964 in the village Birlik, Moiynkum District, Jambyl Region, Kazakhstan.

In 1981, he graduated from Sergei Kirov Secondary School. In 1984, Assylov was drafted into the Soviet Air Defense Forces in Kaunas, Lithuania, serving until 1986, after which he enrolled at Kazakh State University and earned a law degree in 1991.

== Political career ==
Upon graduation, Berik Assylov immediately in 1991, joined the Alatau District Prosecutor's Office in Almaty as an intern, advancing to senior investigator, investigator, and senior investigator for particularly important cases at the General Prosecutor's Office of Kazakhstan; until 2001, he served as Deputy Almaty Aviation Transport Prosecutor and headed the department overseeing the legality of operational-search activities.

From 2001 to 2006, he held positions as deputy prosecutor of South Kazakhstan Region, first deputy prosecutor of South Kazakhstan Region, and prosecutor of Shymkent, before being appointed West Kazakhstan Transport Prosecutor in 2006.

On 11 March 2008, Berik Assylov was relieved of his duties and appointed prosecutor of Aktobe Region.

On 28 June 2010, by decree of President Nursultan Nazarbayev, he was appointed deputy prosecutor general of Kazakhstan.

On 2 September 2011, Assylov was relieved of his position by presidential decree, and on 3 September, by order of prosecutor general Asqat Dauylbaev, appointed Prosecutor of Almaty.

On 16 February 2017, by order of prosecutor general Jaqyp Asanov he was appointed Prosecutor of North Kazakhstan Region.

On 28 March 2019, President Tokayev, appointed Berik Assylov first deputy prosecutor general to Ğizat Nurdäuletov. In this position, on 18 September 2021, by Tokayev's decree No. 662, he became a member of the Human Rights Commission under the President of Kazakhstan.

On 3 March 2022 in Senate President Tokayev proposed Assylov for the post of prosecutor general. Senators voted for Asylov's candidacy, and Assylov was appointed to the post by presidential decree No. 823. After the new Constitution was adopted in 2026, which gives the president the sole authority to appoint the prosecutor general, Tokayev reappointed Berik Assylov to the post on 7 July.

== Other positions ==
On 23 April 2025 at the General Assembly of the National Olympic Committee of Kazakhstan, Asılov was elected President of the Kazakhstan Shooting Federation.

== Awards ==
- Order of Glory I and II class (2017, 2011)
- Order of the Leopard I class (2016)
