= Fariza Ongarsynova =

Kazakh poet and writer (1939-2014)

- Фариза Оңғарсынова
- Born: 25 December 1939; Manash village, Atyrau Region, Kazakh SSR, Soviet Union
- Died: 23 January 2014 (aged 74); Astana, Kazakhstan
- Notable work: "A Poet" (Kazakh: Ақын)
- Children: 2
- Awards: The Order Of Honor (1976); State prize of the Kazakh SSR named after Abay (1979); Excellent student of public education (1985); People's writer of the Republic of Kazakhstan (1996)

Fariza Oñğarsynqyzy Oñğarsynova (Kazakh: Фариза Оңғарсынқызы Оңғарсынова; 25 December 1939 – 23 January 2014) was a Kazakh poet. She was a People's Writer of Kazakhstan (1991), laureate of the state prize of the Kazakh SSR named after Abay (1979), a public figure, and the author of a number of poetry books and publications.

== Life ==
Fariza was born in the village Manash of the Novobogatinsk region of the district Guriev region (now Atyrau region). Fariza's father Ongarsyn Imangaliyev was a respected man in Kazakhstan. He organized the first fishery in the Atyrau region. Her mother Kamila knew the Arabic language and Kazakh oral literature. The name Fariza was given to her by Azan with the Tatar molda named Nasimolla in the village of Manash. Fariza was the youngest in the family; her brothers and sisters died at an early age. Her father died at an early age and her mother died in the 1970s. Since childhood, she demonstrated poetic qualities, composing poems regarding the circumstances that influenced her. She had two sons, Anvar and Almas. She also raised the children of her brother, who died at an early age.

== Career ==
In 1961 she graduated from the faculty of Philology of Guryev Pedagogical University. From 1961 to 1969, she alternately held the positions of teacher of Kazakh language and literature, head teacher and Director in rural schools. In 1966, she began her journalistic activity as a literary employee of the editorial office of the Guryev regional newspaper Kommunistik Enbek (Communist labor). From 1969 to 1970, she was her own correspondent of the newspaper Leninshil Zhas (Lenin youth) in Guryev, Aktobe, Ural region. From 1970 to 1977, she served as editor of the Republican newspaper Kazakhstan pioneri (Pioneer of Kazakhstan). From 1978 to 1996, she was chief editor of the Republican magazine Pioneer. From 1996 to 2004, she was Deputy of the Majilis of the Parliament of Kazakhstan I and II convocations.

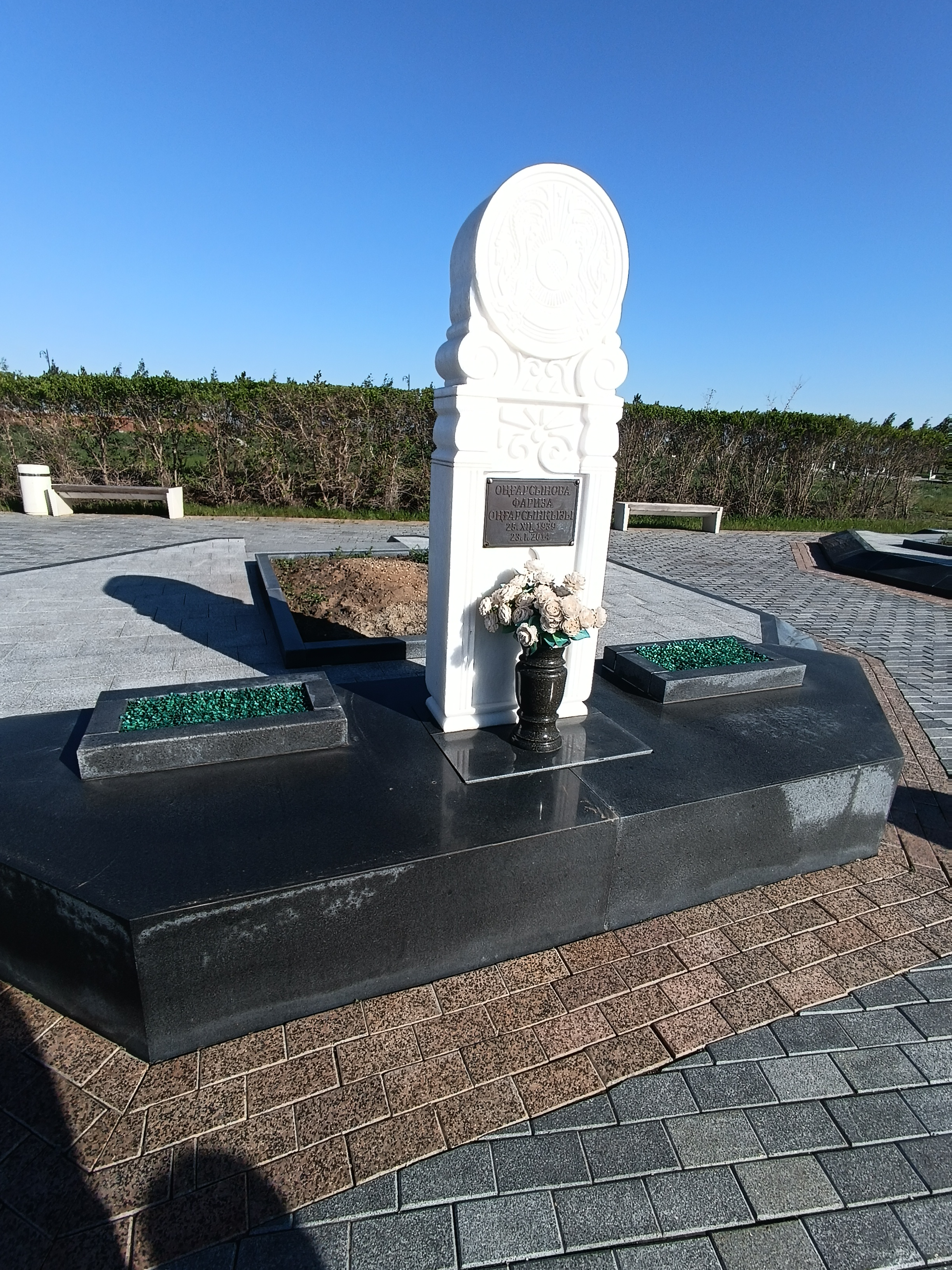
Ongarsynova's gravestone at the National Pantheon of Kazakhstan

Ongarsynova died at the age of 74 on 23 January 2014. The cause of her death is not known. She was buried on 27 January 2014 in the National Pantheon of Kazakhstan.

== Works ==
Ongarsynova's first poems were published in the Republican press in 1958. Many of her works have been translated into foreign languages. She translated Chilean poet Pablo Neruda's Four times of the heart into Kazakh, as well as a series of poems by the Russian poet A. A. Blok: "Lust", "Kulikovo steppes", "Twelve years later", "Carmen", "Snow curtain", as well as separate works of R. F. Kazakova, E. A. Yevtushenko, and the Arab poet Abdrahman al-Hamisi.

== Awards and prizes ==
- The Order Of Honor (1976)
- State prize of the Kazakh SSR named after Abay (1979)
- Excellent student of public education (1985)
- People's writer of the Republic of Kazakhstan (1996)
- The Order Of Parasat (1996)
- Order of Dostyk I degree (2009)
- Diploma of the Presidium of the Supreme Soviet of the Kazakh SSR
