= Chairman of the Supreme Court of Kazakhstan =

Chair of the Supreme Court of the Republic of Kazakhstan
- Қазақстан Республикасы Жоғарғы Сотының төрағасы (Kazakh); Председатель Верховного суда Республики Казахстан (Russian)
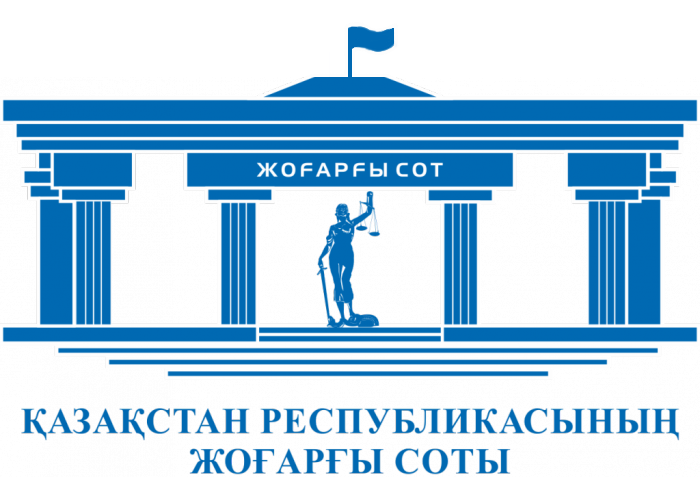
- Emblem of the Supreme Court
- Incumbent; Aslambek Merğaliev since 8 December 2022
- Supreme Court of Kazakhstan
- Style: Mr. Chair
- Type: Chief justice
- Member of: Judicery of Kazakhstan
- Seat: Astana
- Appointer: The President (upon recommendation of Highest Judicial Council); Senate advice and consent
- Term length: Life tenure until the mandatory retirement age of 65
- Precursor: Chief Justice of the Kazakh SSR
- Formation: 10 December 1991 (34 years ago)
- First holder: Tamas Aitmukhambetov (1991)
- Deputy: Deputy Chief Justice

The chair of the Supreme Court of the Republic Kazakhstan (Kazakh: Қазақстан Республикасы Жоғарғы Сотының төрағасы; Russian: Председатель Верховного суда Республики Казахстан) is the chief judge of the Supreme Court of Kazakhstan. In Kazakhstan's legal tradition, the position is both judicial and administrative: the chair performs the duties of a chief justice while simultaneously managing the organization and internal functioning of the Supreme Court.

The constitutional basis of the office is found in the Constitution of Kazakhstan, while its powers are described in the Constitutional Law "On the Judicial System and Status of Judges".

== Appointment ==
Under Section V, Article 82 of the Constitution of the Republic of Kazakhstan, the chair of the Supreme Court of Kazakhstan is elected by deputies of the Senate following the proposal of the President, which itself is based on recommendation from the Highest Judicial Council. Once elected, the chair receives the same status and guarantees as any Supreme Court judge, but with expanded responsibilities for managing the court's institutional affairs.

=== Oath of office ===
Upon election by the Senate, the chair of the Supreme Court takes the judicial oath required by the Article 32 of the Constitutional Law "On the Judicial System and Status of Judges". The oath obliges the chair, like all judges, to administer justice impartially and in accordance with the Constitution and laws of the Republic of Kazakhstan and is taken at a formal session of the Senate, marking the official assumption of office. The oath is as follows:

"I solemnly swear to carry out my duties honestly and conscientiously, to administer justice subject only to the Constitution and the Laws of the Republic of Kazakhstan and to be impartial and fair as my duty of a judge tells me."

== Powers and responsibilities ==
The Constitutional Law "On the Judicial System and Status of Judges" defines the broad legal guarantees of judicial independence and sets out the internal organisation of the Supreme Court. It is within this framework that the chair exercises authority as both the Court's leader and its main administrative figure.

=== Judicial leadership ===
As the head of the Supreme Court, the chair plays the central role in shaping judicial practice nationwide. One of the responsibilities is convening and presiding over plenary sessions of the Court. At these sessions, judges review the stability and consistency of judicial practice and decide on the adoption of regulatory resolutions, which serve as authoritative guidance for lower courts on how to interpret legislation.

The chair also oversees the preparation of materials submitted to plenary sessions, especially in situations where inconsistent interpretations appear in different regions or where a new law requires clarification. When the Supreme Court carries out supervisory review of judicial acts, it is the chair who reports the results to the full Court.

=== Administrative powers ===
The chair approves annual work plans, coordinates the activity of the judicial boards (civil, criminal, administrative), and supervises the functioning of the Court’s internal administration. The chair determines the structure of the administrative apparatus, appoints its leadership, and may initiate changes in internal staffing when needed. In cooperation with the Highest Judicial Council, the chair participates in establishing how many judges are required in regional and local courts.

The chair also has the authority to reassign judges from one judicial board to another. Although used only, when necessary, this mechanism helps ensure that caseloads are handled efficiently and that the Court avoids delays in its proceedings.

=== Ethics and public role ===
Another area defined by law is the chair's responsibility for maintaining judicial ethics and preventing corruption. The chair is expected to set the tone for ethical conduct across the judiciary and to initiate internal measures supporting transparency and integrity.

The chair also represents the judiciary in relations with the President, Parliament, ministries, and international organisations. This representative function is not merely ceremonial; in practice, it positions the chair as the judiciary's voice in national discussions on legal reform. By law, the chair may also personally receive citizens and organisations, giving the public a direct channel to the Supreme Court leadership.

== Succession and acting leadership ==
If the chair of the Supreme Court is temporarily unable to perform their duties, one of the chairs of the Court's judicial boards may act in their place.

In the event of a vacancy, Article 82 of the Constitution of Kazakhstan stipulates the President may appoint an acting chair until the Senate elects a new chair in accordance with the constitutional procedure.

== List of chairs ==
Chairs of the Kazakh Branch of the Supreme Court of the RSFSR

- Nigmet Nurmakov (October 1921 – April 1923)
- Tleuzhan Mukashev (March 1924 – June 1925)
- Murzagul Ataniyazov (May 1925 – March 1927)
- Sermukhamed Bekbatyrov (March 1927)

Chairs of the Supreme Court of the Kazakh ASSR

- Nigmatulla Syrgabekov (May 1929 – November 1929)
- Nagima Arykova (1929–1930)
- Gumar Dzhunusov (July 1931 – 1932)
- Kazmukhamed Kuletov (July 1932 – 1934)
- Shaimerden Bekturganov (May 1934 – 1937)

Chairs of the Supreme Court of the Kazakh SSR

- Shaimerden Bekturganov (May 1934 – 1937)
- Abdrakhman Kuskeldiev (December 1937 – August 1938)
- Pyotr Gromov (August 1938 – April 1939)
- Temirgali Kozhabergenov (April 1939 – May 1941)
- Myrzakadir Nurbaev (1941–1942)
- Tanirbergen Adilbaev (April 1943 – October 1945)
- Omadyar Adambaev (1946)
- Abidulla Biekenov (from 24 May 1946)
- Abdrakhman Dosanov (August 1946 – August 1958)
- Amir Nurushev (1958–1959)
- Kuntuar Suleimenov (1958–1962)
- Bekaydar Dzhusupov (June 1962 – September 1970)
- Kair Mynbaev (November 1970 – May 1981)
- Galim Elemisov (June 1981 – January 1984)
- Tamas Aytmukhametov (1984–1993)

Chairs of the Supreme Court of the Republic of Kazakhstan

- Tamas Aytmukhametov (1984–1993)
- Mikhail Malakhov (December 1993 – 1996)
- Maksut Narikbaev (1996–2000)
- Kairat Mami (September 2000 – April 2009)
- Musabek Alimbekov (2009–2011)
- Bektas Beknazarov (2011–2013)
- Kairat Mami (2013–2017)
- Jaqyp Asanov (2017–2022)
- Aslambek Merğaliev (since 2022)

== See also ==
- Supreme Court of Kazakhstan
- Constitutional Court of Kazakhstan
