= Maksut Narikbaev =

Kazakh jurist

- Мақсұт Нәрікбаев

3rd Chairman of the Supreme Court of Kazakhstan
- In office June 1996 – September 2000
- Preceded by: Mikhail Makalov
- Succeeded by: Kairat Mami

Personal details
- Born: 9 May 1940 Erkin, Taldykorgan District, Alma-Ata Oblast, Kazakh SSR, Soviet Union (now Jetisu Region, Kazakhstan)
- Died: 12 October 2015 (aged 75) Astana, Kazakhstan
- Profession: Jurist

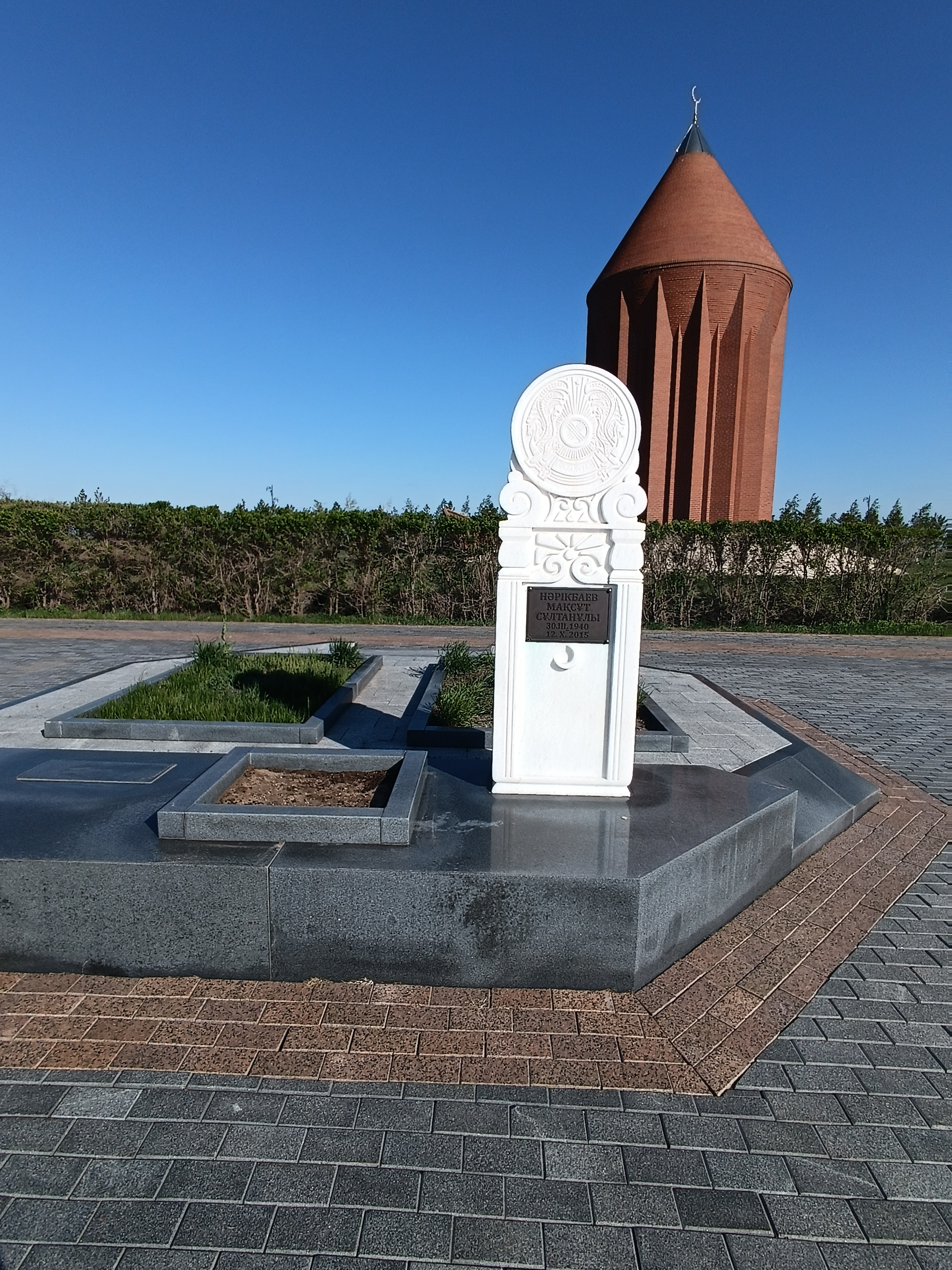
Närıkbaev's grave at the National Pantheon of Kazakhstan

Maqsūt Sūltanūly Närıkbaev (Note: Often transliterated as Maksut Sultanovich Narikbayev through a Russified Romanization of Максут Султанович Нарикбаев.) (Kazakh: Мақсұт Сұлтанұлы Нәрікбаев; 9 May 1940 – 12 October 2015) was a Soviet-Kazakh jurist, who served as the third Chairman of the Supreme Court of Kazakhstan. Between 2004 and 2012, he served as the chairman of the Democratic Party Adilet. In 2012, he retired as the chairman and was elected an honorary chairman of the party.

== Biography ==
Närıkbaev was born in 1940 to a Sunni Muslim Kazakh family in Taldykorgan District of Almaty Region. He is the son of Sūltan Närıkbaev.

Between 1968 and 1978, he studied law in the Kazakh State University in Almaty. From 1987, he was employed by the State Prosecutor of Kazakhstan. He held degrees of the candidate of science and the doctor of science. Between October 1995 and June 1996, Närıkbaev was the State Prosecutor of Kazakhstan, subsequently until September 2000, he was the Chairman of the Supreme Court of Kazakhstan.

Närıkbaev died on 12 October 2015 at the age of 75 in Astana. He is buried at the National Pantheon of Kazakhstan.
