= Georgy Kim (statesman) =

Kazakhstani politician

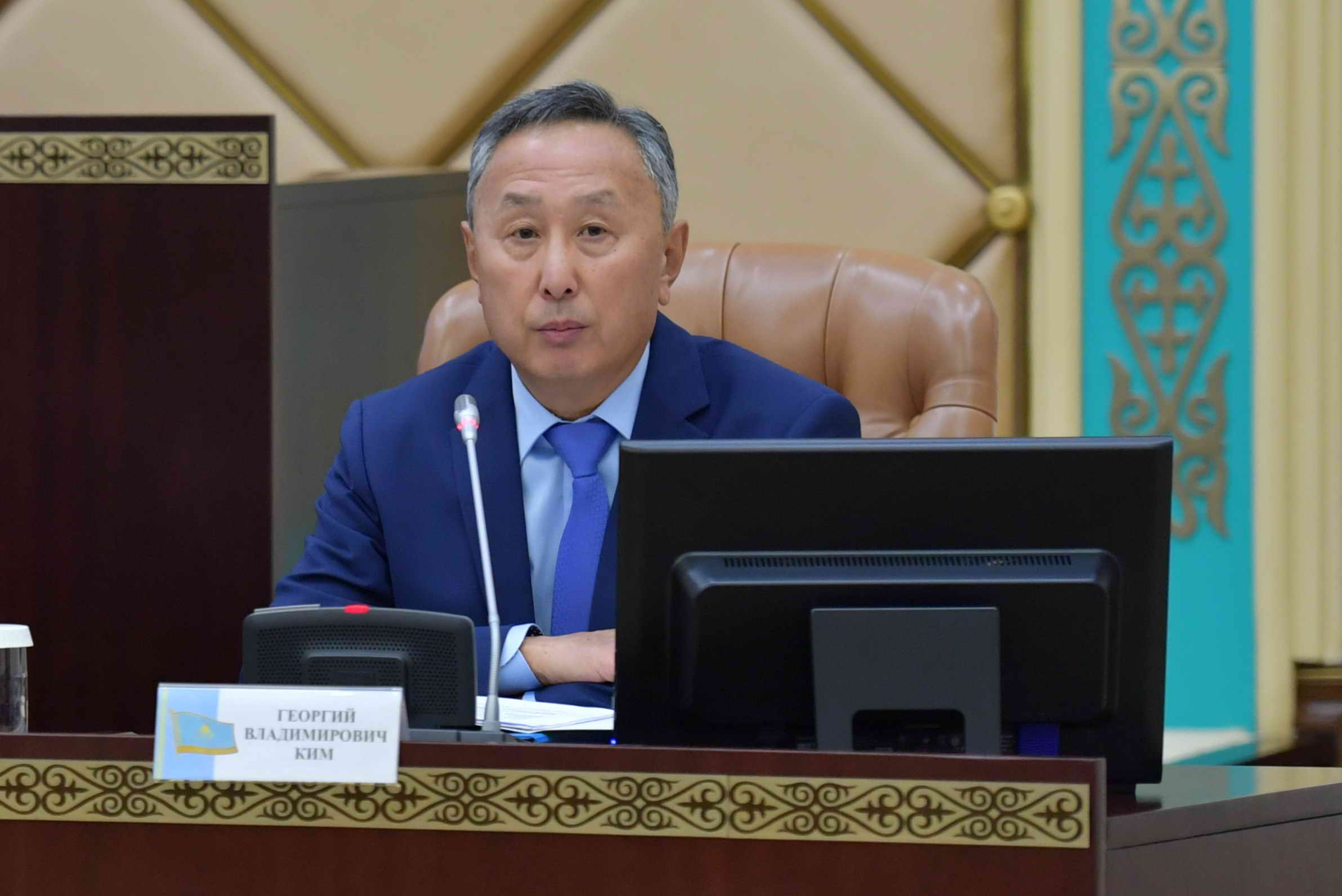
Image of Georgiy Kim

Georgy Vladimirovich Kim (Russian: Георгий Владимирович Ким, born May 11, 1953) was a statesman of Kazakhstan, lawyer, Chairman of the Constitutional Court of Kazakhstan (1992–1995), Minister of Justice (2002–2003).
