= Aslambek Merğaliev =

Kazakh lawyer (born 1972)

- Асламбек Мерғалиев

Chairman of the Supreme Court of Kazakhstan
- Incumbent
- Assumed office 8 December 2022
- President: Kassym-Jomart Tokayev
- Preceded by: Jaqyp Asanov

Personal details
- Born: 2 April 1972 (age 54) Qaraqudyq, Ertis District, Pavlodar Region, Kazakh SSR, Soviet Union
- Spouse: Gülsara Merğalieva
- Children: 3
- Education: Istanbul University
- Awards: Order of the Leopard (3rd class)

Aslambek Amangeldıūly Merğaliev (Note: Often transliterated as Aslambek Amangeldinovich Mergaliev through a Russified Romanization of Асламбек Амангельдинович Мергалиев.) (Kazakh: Асламбек Амангелдіұлы Мерғалиев; born 2 April 1972) is a Kazakh lawyer and jurist serving as the Chairman of the Supreme Court.

== Early life and education ==
Merğaliev was born on 2 April 1972, in the village Qaraqudıq, Ertis District, Pavlodar Region.

In 1999, he graduated from Istanbul University with a degree in law.

== Career ==
Merğaliev began work in 1998 as a lawyer at a private firm in Ekıbastūz. In 1999, he worked as chief specialist of the Department of Justice of the Pavlodar region. From 2001 to 2003, he was the chief specialist of the Pavlodar Regional Court.

On 7 March 2003, by Decree of President Nazarbayev No. 92, he was appointed Judge of the Pavlodar City Court.

On 13 February 2007, Nazarbayev's Decree No. 287 named him Chairman of the Specialized Administrative Court within Ekibastuz City Court. On 28 November 2008, he advanced to Chairman of that same City Court.

On 2 July 2012, he took the helm as Chairman of Court No. 2 of Pavlodar.

On 17 June 2014, he was appointed Chairman of the Appeals Judicial Board for Criminal Cases of the North Kazakhstan Regional Court.

Later, on 18 December 2015, by Nazarbayev's decree, he became Chairman of Kostanay Regional Court, and on 31 December 2020 by Tokayev's decree No. 486, Chairman of Aqtobe Regional Court.

On 8 December 2022, Aqorda Chief of Staff Nurtileu in Senate read out President Tokayev's proposal to appoint Merğaliev as chairman of the Supreme Court. Senators unanimously approved the nomination, as a result of which he took the oath of office. After the new Constitution was adopted in 2026, which gives the president the sole authority to appoint the chairman of the Supreme Court, Tokayev reappointed Mergaliev to the post on 7 July 2026.

== Personal life ==
Merğaliev is married to Gülsara Merğalieva (born 1973). Together they have daughters, Amina (born 1996) and Adel (born 2002) Merğalieva, and a son, Ersūltan (born 2007).

== Awards ==
- Order of the Leopard 3rd degree.
