= Supreme Court of Kazakhstan =

Highest of three levels of courts of Kazakhstan

Supreme Court of the Republic of Kazakhstan
- Kazakh: Қазақстан Республикасының Жоғарғы Соты (Qazaqstan Respublikasynyñ Joğarğy Soty); Russian: Верховный Суд Республики Казахстан (Verkhovny Sud Respubliki Kazakhstan)
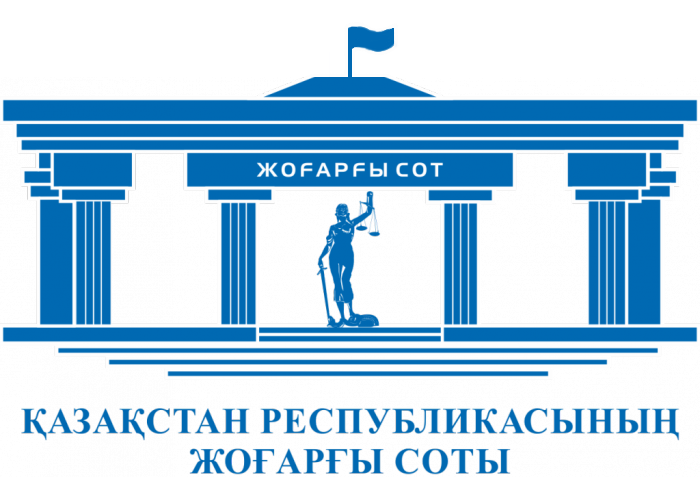
- Interactive map of Supreme Court of the Republic of Kazakhstan
- 51.129249°N 71.443813°E
- Location: Supreme Court Building; 39 Täuelsızdık Street, Astana
- Coordinates: 51.129249°N 71.443813°E

Chair Kazakh: Төраға (Törağa) Russian: Председатель (Predsedatel)
- Currently: Aslambek Mergaliev

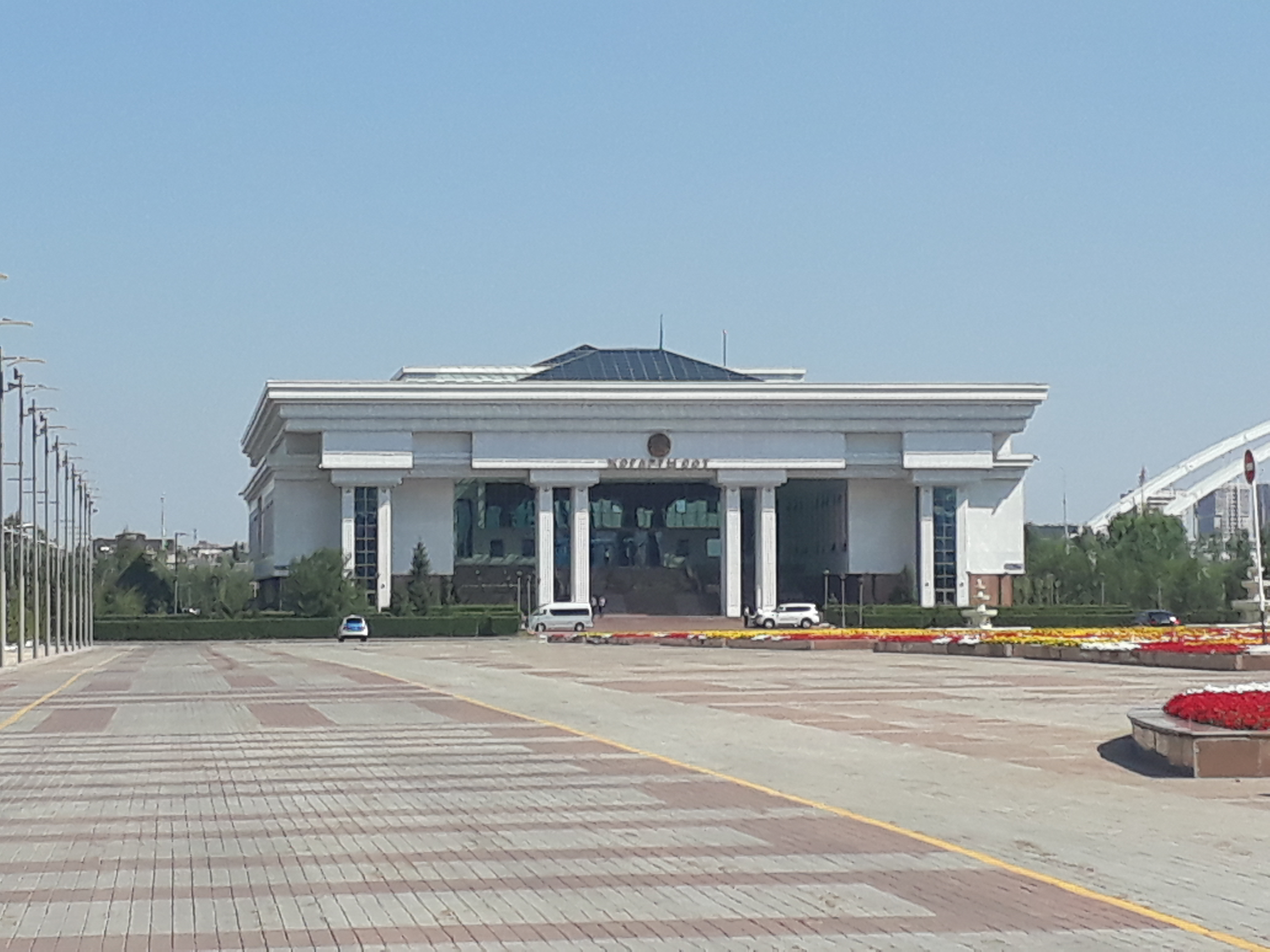
Seat of the Court in Astana

The Supreme Court of the Republic of Kazakhstan is the highest of three levels of courts of Kazakhstan, sitting above regional appeals courts, and city or district courts (courts of first instance). The Supreme Judicial Council recommends nominee Supreme Court judges to the President of Kazakhstan; the president then submits the nominees to the Senate of Kazakhstan for a vote of confirmation.

== History ==
Under the original constitution of Kazakhstan in 1993, there were three high courts: the Constitutional Court (Конституционный суд), the Arbitration Court (Высший Арбитражный суд), and the Supreme Court. In 1995, the new constitution, along with the new presidential decree "On the courts and the status of courts in the Republic of Kazakhstan" altered the structure of the judiciary and decreased the executive branch's power over it; the Arbitration Court was eliminated, while the Constitutional Court and the Supreme Court were separated more clearly.

In April 2011, the Senate removed six Supreme Court judges, and further recommended that Chair Älımbekov resign.

== List of chairs ==
This section lists the chairs of the Supreme Court since the establishment of Kazakhstan:

- Tamas Aitmūhambetov: 1992–1993. Continued over from 1984–1991 chairship of the Supreme Court of the Kazakh Soviet Socialist Republic.
- Mikhail Malakhov: 1993–1996
- Maqsūt Närıkbaev: 1996–2000
- Qairat Mämi: 2000–2009. Left his position to become Prosecutor General of Kazakhstan, in part of a larger presidential reshuffle of judiciary personnel.
- Mūsabek Älımbekov: 2009–2011. Promoted from his previous position as head of the court's Civil Affairs Board.
- Qairat Mämi: 2011
- Bektas Beknazarov: 2011–2013
- Qairat Mämi: 2013–2017
- Jaqyp Asanov: 2017–2022
- Aslambek Mergaliev: 2022–
