= Chairman of the Constitutional Court of Kazakhstan =

Chair of the Constitutional Court of the Republic of Kazakhstan
- Қазақстан Республикасы Конституциялық Сотының төрағасы (Kazakh); Председатель Конституционного суда Республики Казахстан (Russian)
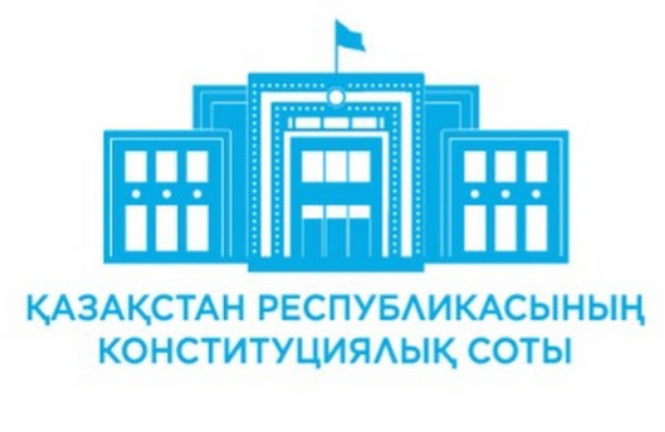
- Coat of Arms of the Constitutional Court

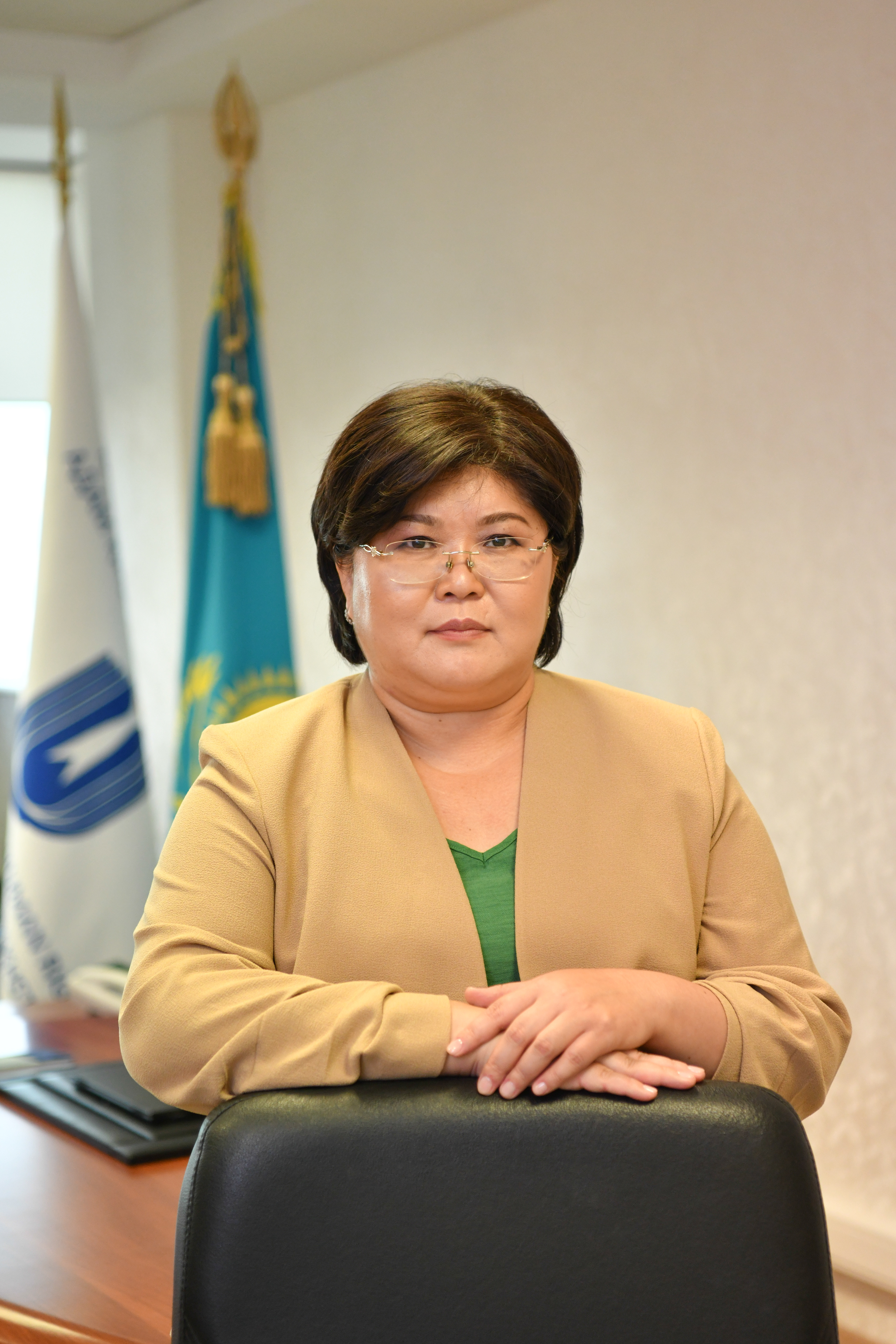
- Incumbent; Elvira Äzimova since 9 January 2023
- Constitutional Court of Kazakhstan
- Type: Presiding judge
- Member of: Judges of the Constitutional Court
- Seat: Astana, Kazakhstan
- Nominator: President of Kazakhstan
- Appointer: Senate
- Term length: 8 years, nonrenewable
- Constituting instrument: Constitution of Kazakhstan; Constitutional Law "On the Constitutional Court of the Republic of Kazakhstan"
- Formation: 5 June 1992; 34 years ago 5 November 2022; 3 years ago (reestablished)
- First holder: Elvira Äzimova
- Website: www.gov.kz/memleket/entities/ksrk/

The chair of the Constitutional Court of the Republic of Kazakhstan (Kazakh: Қазақстан Республикасы Конституциялық Сотының төрағасы; Russian: Председатель Конституционного суда Республики Казахстан) is the presiding judge and administrative head of the Constitutional Court, the highest body of constitutional review in the country. The chair oversees the functioning of the Court, directs its internal administration, and represents it in relations with the President, Parliament, judiciary, and international organisations.

Elvira Äzimova has served as the chairwoman of the Constitutional Court since January 2023.

== History ==
The office of the chair of the Constitutional Court of Kazakhstan was created with the adoption of the Constitutional Law No. 1378-XII "On the Constitutional Court" of 5 June 1992. Under this law, the chair and the judges of the Court were nominated by the President of Kazakhstan and elected by deputies of the Supreme Soviet of Kazakhstan through an open vote for a ten-year term. As the head of the Court, the chair held broad administrative and procedural authority: overseeing case preparation, convening and presiding over sessions, directing the court's internal organization, and issuing annual reports to the President and the Supreme Soviet. The first and only chair of this original Constitutional Court was Murat Baimaqanov. His chairship ended in 1995 when the new Constitution abolished the Constitutional Court and replaced it with the Constitutional Council, a consultative body withlimited standing under the Constitutional Law, since only certain high‑level officials and bodies (not ordinary citizens) could apply to it. While the Council retained some constitutional review powers, its role was more constrained than that of a genuine constitutional court, and the judicially‑empowered office of a chair of a Constitutional Court was effectively dissolved.

Constitutional amendments adopted in a nationwide referendum held on 6 June 2022 restored the Constitutional Court, effective 1 January 2023, reintroducing direct constitutional justice and expanding citizens' rights to constitutional appeal. The reform also reinstated the office of chair, with the first of the revived Court being Elvira Äzimova, appointed in December 2022 and beginning her duties when the Court commenced work in 2023.

== Status ==
The position is established by Article 71 of the Constitution of Kazakhstan, which defines the composition and appointment of the Constitutional Court and its chair.

Under constitutional amendments adopted in 2022, the office of chairship was re-established effective 1 January 2023, replacing the earlier Constitutional Council that had functioned since 1995.

== Appointment ==
The chair is appointed by the President of Kazakhstan with the consent of the Senate. Candidates must meet the general requirements for Constitutional Court judges to which any citizen of Kazakhstan who is at least forty years old, holds a higher legal education, possesses high professional qualifications, an impeccable reputation, and has not less than fifteen years of legal experience may be appointed to the Constitutional Court.

The chair's term of office is eight years, identical to all judges of the Court. A person may not be appointed for more than one term.

=== Oath of office ===
Upon appointment, the chair takes the judicial oath at the official session following confirmation by the Senate prescribed for all judges of the Constitutional Court:

"I solemnly swear to fulfill in good faith and conscientiously the high duties assigned to me as a judge of the Constitutional Court of the Republic of Kazakhstan, to be impartial and in my activities to subordinate only to the Constitution of the Republic of Kazakhstan, to ensure its supremacy."

== Powers and responsibilities ==
The chair exercises both judicial and administrative authority as stipulated in Article 27, Section 1 of the Constitutional Law "On the Constitutional Court of the Republic of Kazakhstan":

- Manage preparation for consideration of the issues accepted by the Constitutional Court for proceedings;
- Convene sessions and conferences of the Constitutional Court, preside at them, submit questions for their consideration;
- Organize the work of the Constitutional Court judges;
- Determine measures to ensure the holding of the meeting;
- Announce at a joint session of the Parliament Chambers of the Republic of Kazakhstan the message of the Constitutional Court on the state of constitutional legality in the Republic of Kazakhstan;
- Sign the decisions, as well as the minutes of the Constitutional Court sessions, in which he presided;
- Submit for the Constitutional Court approval its Regulations, the provision on the scientific advisory council at the Constitutional Court, the candidacies of the secretary and members of the scientific advisory council;
- Approve the Regulations on the Apparatus of the Constitutional Court, within the allocated budgetary funds - the structure and personnel of the Apparatus of the Constitutional Court;
- Appoint and dismiss the head of the Apparatus of the Constitutional Court and his deputies;
- Exercise other powers in accordance with this Constitutional Law and the Rules of the Constitutional Court.

== Removal and termination of powers ==
The chair may be removed from office only on the same legal grounds that apply to other judges of the Constitutional Court. These grounds include:

- expiration of the eight-year term;
- voluntary resignation;
- inability to perform duties;
- incompatibility with judicial office;
- and misconduct or violation of legal or ethical requirements, as defined by constitutional law.

Termination of the chair's powers is effected by the President of Kazakhstan, in accordance with the procedures laid down in the Constitutional Law.

== Acting chair ==
In cases of temporary absence of the chair of the Constitutional Court, their duties are performed by the deputy chair. If both the chair and the deputy chair are temporarily unable to perform their functions, the chair may designate one of the judges of the Constitutional Court to act in their place.

The deputy chair coordinates the organization of Court sessions, oversees the preparation and maintenance of minutes, and carries out other tasks assigned by the chair in accordance with the Constitutional Law.

== List of chairs ==
Chair		Took office	Left office	Tenure length	Alma mater	Appointed by	Ref.
1	Murat Baimaqanov (born 1933)	2 July 1992	19 October 1995	3 years, 109 days	Moscow State University	Nursultan Nazarbayev	
Vacant; Constitutional Court defunct from 1995 to 2023
2	Elvira Äzimova (born 1973)	9 January 2023	Incumbent	3 years, 241 days	Ahmet Yassawi University	Kassym-Jomart Tokayev	

== See also ==
- Chairman of the Supreme Court of Kazakhstan
