= Republican Referendum =

The term Republican Referendum can refer to:

- The 1999 Australian republic referendum, an Australian national plebiscite on replacing the monarchy with a republican government
- The 2022 Kazakh constitutional referendum, locally referred to as the "Republican Referendum" (Kazakh: Республикалық референдум, romanized: Respublikalyq referendum), a nationwide vote on proposed amendments to the constitution of Kazakhstan
