= New Kazakhstan =

Kazakh political concept

New Kazakhstan (Kazakh: Жаңа Қазақстан, romanized: Jaña Qazaqstan; Russian: Новый Казахстан, romanized: Novyi Kazakhstan) is a concept developed by President Kassym-Jomart Tokayev that represents a forward-looking national aspiration for progress, renewal, and modernization in various aspects of Kazakhstan's governance and society. It was first proposed in 2022 following the January events as a response to the societal challenges and demands for change during that period.

With the concept of New Kazakhstan, the government aims to foster a more effective state administration, strengthen civil society institutions, and promote a harmonious balance between political and economic reforms. The vision envisions a sovereign nation with a clear direction towards embracing modernization, enhancing international cooperation, and positioning Kazakhstan as a prominent player on the global stage.

== Background ==
The term "New Kazakhstan" was originally coined by then-president Nursultan Nazarbayev during the 2007 State of the Nation Address titled "New Kazakhstan in the New World", which was first used to as a descriptive phrase to highlight the Kazakhstan's progress and development since gaining independence from the Soviet Union in 1991, as well as aspirations for socio-economic development, political modernization, and international engagement.

In 2019, Kassym-Jomart Tokayev was elected as president following the resignation of Nazarbayev. From there, Tokayev pledged to enhance reforms and build on the foundation laid by Nazarbayev as response to growing political demands by the Kazakh society. At the September 2019 State of the Nation Address, Tokayev unveiled the concept of a listening state, which encouraged state apparatuses, specifically local authorities, to serve the interests of citizens via constant dialogue. This approach emphasized the importance of engaging with the public, understanding their needs, and addressing their concerns to create a responsive and accountable government. However, Tokayev's policies were criticized for being lacking in concrete implementation plans and facing challenges in effectively addressing some of the country's pressing issues, noting that his predecessor Nazarbayev still possessed significant influence and power behind the scenes. Despite assuming the presidency, critics argued that Tokayev's ability to fully implement his reform agenda and assert his independent leadership was hindered by the continued presence and influence of Nazarbayev, who held key positions in the government such as the chairmanship of the Security Council and ruling Nur Otan party.

The lingering influence of Nazarbayev and the perceived challenges in fully implementing Tokayev's reform agenda contributed to a growing sense of frustration and disillusionment among the Kazakh population, which essentially sparked massive protests across Kazakhstan in January 2022. The protests, evolving into violent civil unrest, demanded for more reforms and a genuine shift towards the vision of New Kazakhstan.

=== Announcement ===
Following the quelling of the unrest, President Tokayev first hinted the concept during a speech given to the Parliament on 11 January 2022, where he embarked that the country would overcome its difficulties and together build "a new Kazakhstan." Tokayev's "New Kazakhstan" phrase was further accompanied by his State Secretary, Erlan Karin, who described the agenda as being designed to "inspire society, give hope and optimism", stating: "This is not only a renewal of the state apparatus, as some experts simplistically represent. This is, first of all, a reset of social values. Rejection of radicalism, extreme views and actions, strengthening the creative motive. Overcoming all sorts of faults in society. It also means continuing incremental and systemic reforms. The humanitarian dimension of state policy and the stake on human capital." According to Senate chairman Mäulen Äşimbaev, during a February 2022 interview in YouTube channel NeKurultai, the concept of "New Kazakhstan" emphasized the need for openness, adaptability, and the willingness to change. It involves engaging with experts, analyzing global experiences, and listening to the opinions of young professionals who actively contribute to the preparation of draft laws.

On 16 March 2022, during the State of the Nation Address, President Tokayev announced the New Kazakhstan concept, unveiling a forward-looking vision for progress, renewal, and modernization in various aspects of the country's governance and society. The concept was presented as a response to the pressing challenges facing Kazakhstan and aimed to chart a new course towards a more dynamic and prosperous future.

== Initiatives ==
Tokayev's New Kazakhstan concept encompassed a comprehensive set of reforms aiming to modernize and strengthen various aspects of the country's political system under a formula of "a strong President – an influential Parliament – an accountable Government".

=== On the powers of the President ===
Tokayev's proposed reforms encompassed multiple aspects of Kazakhstan's political system. To begin, he aimed to separate party and state structures by relinquishing his post as chairman of the Amanat party. Additionally, he proposed legislation to ensure that the President must terminate party membership during their office term, fostering fair political competition and equal opportunities for all parties. Secondly, President Tokayev addressed the issue of power concentration by suggesting a prohibition on akims and their deputies from holding positions in party branches. This approach was intended to foster a multipolar party system in the country. Furthermore, he sought to counter nepotism and corruption by introducing a legislative ban on the President's close family members from occupying political civil servant and quasi-public sector positions. Lastly, Tokayev emphasized the need to revise presidential powers by eliminating the right to cancel or suspend actions of regional and local akims, thereby enhancing the independence and efficacy of local governance.

=== Reformatting the representative branch of government ===
In his second area of focus, President Tokayev aimed to reformat the legislative branch of government in Kazakhstan to enhance the role of the Parliament and promote state stability. This involved reducing the powers of the President to allow responsible deputies to actively participate in state-building. Key changes included reducing the presidential quota in the Senate, strengthening the role of the lower chamber Mäjilis by abolishing the Assembly of People of Kazakhstan (QHA) quota, and expanding the Mäjilis' functionality for parliamentary control over the national budget. The influence of local assemblies (mäslihat) would also be strengthened, and the process for appointing regional mayors would be restructured, enabling indirect elections through approval by the mäslihat. The overarching goal was to establish a more balanced and accountable governance system that reflects the diverse interests of the nation.

=== Improvement of the electoral system ===
President Tokayev's overarching goal of political modernization in Kazakhstan was to increase citizens' involvement in governing the state through electoral processes. To achieve this, he proposed a comprehensive set of reforms, including a switch from single-nationwide proportional representation to a mixed-member majoritarian representation. This change aimed to ensure better representation of voters' interests at both the national and regional levels. The introduction of the imperative mandate also strengthened the link between representatives and voters, allowing for recalls in case of unfulfilled promises. The overall plan was to create a more inclusive, accountable, and responsive political system, empowering citizens and fostering new leadership opportunities at the local level.

=== Expanding opportunities for the development of the party system ===
The New Kazakhstan's focus on building a more progressive political landscape led to significant changes in party registration procedures. The registration threshold was reduced to 5,000 people from the previous 20,000, and the minimum required number of individuals at regional branches was brought down to 200 from 600. Additionally, the number of citizens' initiative groups needed to create a party decreased to 700 from 1,000.

=== Modernisation of the electoral process ===
The New Kazakhstan sought to modernize the electoral process, drawing insights from international practices. The impact of the COVID-19 pandemic and technological advancements prompted the consideration of alternative voting methods, such as electronic, early, remote, and multi-day voting. To keep up with the evolving landscape, campaigning on social networks was proposed to be formally allowed and regulated. The role of observers was emphasized, and their rights and responsibilities were to be clearly defined in the legislation. Territorial Election Commissions would transition to a professional basis, and a single electronic voter database was considered to prevent duplicate voting. Limits on donations to election funds were proposed to prevent undue influence, and measures to safeguard against foreign interference in Kazakhstan's elections were to be implemented, focusing on financial transparency for all participants in the electoral process.

=== Strengthening human rights institutions ===
The strengthening of human rights institutions was a central objective in establishing a fair and just state. Proposals included creating a Constitutional Court to provide citizens with direct access for legal clarifications, abolishing the death penalty, and improving the investigation of torture-related crimes. Measures were also taken to address violence in society. Separate constitutional laws for the Prosecutor General's Office and Human Rights aimed to bolster the rule of law. Transparency in the judiciary was emphasized through online broadcasts and explanations of procedures. Reforms for media independence and accountability were promoted. Collaboration between the state and NGOs was encouraged, and the establishment of a National Kurultai aimed to foster inclusive partnerships between the government and society, promoting dialogue and national unity.

=== Improvement of the administrative-territorial structure ===
The overall summary highlights the proposed improvements to Kazakhstan's administrative-territorial structure to align with the country's evolving needs. The creation of new regions like Abai and Ulytau, along with the division of Almaty Region, aimed to address regional issues, tap into economic potential, and honor historical figures. These changes were expected to enhance governance, simplify commuting, and regulate migration. The proposed names carried cultural significance. The Government was tasked with studying and implementing the initiatives, while measures to optimize civil servants and limit deputies were suggested for efficient governance.

=== Decentralisation of local self-government ===
To achieve successful political modernization and foster a thriving civil society, the New Kazakhstan concept committed to further decentralizing power and transferring real powers from the center to the regions. The mäslihats had their powers clearly outlined to enhance their effectiveness. To empower local governments, a radical revision of the regional financing system was deemed essential, introducing direct financing based on international best practices. Expanding their ownership base granted them substantial resources to exert real influence and responsibility, moving beyond mere imitation of self-government. Streamlining procurement procedures for local governments eliminated bureaucracy and formalism, facilitating efficient decision-making.

=== On priority anti-crisis measures ===
In response to unprecedented financial and economic challenges, the New Kazakhstan implemented priority anti-crisis measures. The focus was on stabilizing the Kazakhstani tenge, curbing speculative demand, and ensuring food security amid rising global food prices. Urging swift and harmonious action, the government sought to eliminate bureaucratic hurdles and make prompt decisions. Plans for de-bureaucratization were set in motion to optimize state processes. To pave the way for a New Kazakhstan, a combination of political and economic reforms was emphasized, aiming for progress and improved living standards for citizens.

== Chronology ==
After the announcement of New Kazakhstan concept, Tokayev ordered the creation of a working group on 28 March 2022 to develop proposals for amendments and additions to the Constitution of the Republic of Kazakhstan. In addition, a National Plan was presented, which included proposed constitutional changes under New Kazakhstan.

On 29 April 2022, Tokayev suggested to hold a constitutional referendum over his proposed amendments to the constitution. The referendum was supported with 77.2% of the voters in favour and 18.7% opposed and changed 33 of the document's 98 articles. The amendments adopted after the referendum, were officially signed into law by Tokayev in a public ceremony on 5 November 2022.

== See also ==
- Kassym-Jomart Tokayev
- 2022 Kazakh constitutional referendum
