= President of the Constitutional Court =

President of the Constitutional Court may refer to:

- Austria : President of the Constitutional Court (Austria)
- France : President of the Constitutional Council (France)
- Indonesia : Chief Justice of the Constitutional Court of Indonesia
- Italy : President of the Constitutional Court of Italy
- Kazakhstan : Chairman of the Constitutional Court of Kazakhstan
- Russia : President of the Constitutional Court of Russia
- South Africa : President of the Constitutional Court of South Africa
- South Korea : President of the Constitutional Court of Korea
- Spain : President of the Constitutional Court (Spain)
- Syria : President of the Constitutional Court of Syria
- Turkey : President of the Constitutional Court of Turkey
