= Yuri Alekseyevich Kim =

- Юрий Алексеевич Ким

1st Chairman of the Constitutional Council of Kazakhstan
- In office 24 January 1996 – 29 November 2000
- President: Nursultan Nazarbayev
- Preceded by: Office established
- Succeeded by: Yuri Khitrin

Chairman of the Central Election Commission of Kazakhstan
- In office 1995–1996
- President: Nursultan Nazarbayev
- Preceded by: Karatay Turysov
- Succeeded by: Zagipa Baliyeva

Personal details
- Born: 3 July 1940 Tentek, Alma-Ata Region, Kazakh SSR, Soviet Union
- Died: 15 November 2000 (aged 60) Astana, Kazakhstan
- Resting place: Almaty, Kazakhstan
- Spouse: Nadezhda Kim
- Education: Kazakh State University
- Occupation: Jurist, statesman
- Awards: Honoured Lawyer of Kazakhstan

Yuri Alekseyevich Kim (Russian: Юрий Алексеевич Ким; 3 July 1940 – 15 November 2000) was a Kazakhstani jurist and statesman who served as the first chairman of the Constitutional Council of Kazakhstan from 1996 to 2000. He previously chaired the Central Election Commission of Kazakhstan in 1995–1996 and was a deputy of the Supreme Council of Kazakhstan in 1994–1995.

Kim held senior positions in Kazakhstan's judicial and justice administration during the late Soviet period and the first decade of independence. He was involved in the establishment of the country's post-independence legal institutions and served as the inaugural head of the Constitutional Council, created under the 1995 Constitution.

He was awarded the honorary title of Honoured Lawyer of the Republic of Kazakhstan.

== Early life and education ==
Kim was born on 3 July 1940 in the village of Tentek, in the Kazakh Soviet Socialist Republic of the Soviet Union.

Some biographical accounts identify his birthplace as being in Taldy-Kurgan Region. However, that administrative region was established on 16 March 1944 from the northern part of Alma-Ata Region. At the time of Kim's birth, the territory belonged to Alma-Ata Region.

Published information about his parents, childhood and early education is limited.

In 1966, Kim graduated from the Faculty of Law of S. M. Kirov Kazakh State University, now known as Al-Farabi Kazakh National University.

== Legal career ==
Following his university education, Kim entered the Soviet legal system. He worked as an investigator for the internal affairs authorities and subsequently as a people's judge in Alma-Ata, now Almaty.

He later held a succession of positions within the justice administration of the Kazakh SSR and independent Kazakhstan.

According to the official biographical records of Kazakhstan's Constitutional Council, Kim spent approximately 15 years in the justice authorities, progressing from deputy head of the Almaty City Department of Justice to First Deputy Minister of Justice of the Republic of Kazakhstan.

His professional responsibilities included judicial administration and the implementation of legal policy.

In 1987, Kim held a senior position in the judicial administration department of the Ministry of Justice.

According to the recollections of Maksut Narikbayev, who later became Prosecutor General of Kazakhstan, Kim appointed him as a senior consultant in that department in February 1987.

Narikbayev subsequently described Kim as an experienced legal administrator and recalled his ability to work with colleagues and address complex legal questions.

== Political and public service ==
=== Supreme Council of Kazakhstan ===
In 1994, Kim was elected to the 13th convocation of the Supreme Council of the Republic of Kazakhstan, the country's legislature at the time.

He also chaired a parliamentary committee, although the precise committee is not identified in the available official biographical summary.

His parliamentary service coincided with a period of institutional and legislative changes following Kazakhstan's independence in December 1991.

According to Narikbayev's recollections, Kim supported the recognition of Kazakh as the state language and regarded Kazakhstan as his homeland.

=== Chairman of the Central Election Commission ===
In 1995, Kim became chairman of the Central Election Commission of Kazakhstan, succeeding Karatay Turysov.

His tenure coincided with major constitutional and political developments in Kazakhstan.

On 29 April 1995, a nationwide referendum extended President Nursultan Nazarbayev's term of office until 2000.

On 30 August 1995, another referendum approved a new Constitution, which established the institutional framework for a bicameral Parliament and reorganised the country's constitutional review system.

As head of the Central Election Commission, Kim participated in the administration of these political processes.

According to a retrospective article published in Novoye Pokoleniye, Kim formally presented Nazarbayev with a presidential certificate signed by the chairman of the Central Election Commission.

The political changes of 1995 were controversial. Opposition groups criticised the abolition of the existing Constitutional Court and its replacement by the Constitutional Council. A retrospective account published by Radio Azattyq also discussed the broader concerns surrounding the electoral system and the concentration of political authority during this period.

Kim left the commission in early 1996, when he was appointed chairman of the newly established Constitutional Council. He was succeeded at the commission by Zagipa Baliyeva.

=== Chairman of the Constitutional Council ===
The Constitution of Kazakhstan, adopted on 30 August 1995, provided for the establishment of the Constitutional Council as the country's principal constitutional review body.

Kim was appointed its first chairman on 24 January 1996.

The Constitutional Council replaced the Constitutional Court that had operated under the previous constitutional framework.

Its constitutional responsibilities included reviewing certain legislation and international treaties for conformity with the Constitution, providing official interpretations of constitutional provisions and examining specified constitutional questions relating to elections and referendums.

Kim oversaw the Council during its initial years, when its procedures, administrative practices and institutional role were being developed.

His chairmanship lasted from 24 January 1996 until the formal end of his term on 29 November 2000, according to the government's official record. Kim had died on 15 November of that year.

He was succeeded by Yuri Khitrin, whose term began on 21 December 2000.

== Legal scholarship ==
In addition to his government service, Kim authored several publications on jurisprudence and legal questions.

The official records of the Constitutional Council identify him as the author of scientific papers in the field of law, although they do not provide a comprehensive bibliography.

His professional career encompassed criminal investigation, judicial service, justice administration, parliamentary work, electoral administration and constitutional review.

== Involvement in the Korean community ==
Kim was a prominent member of Kazakhstan's ethnic Korean community and supported the activities of Korean cultural and civic organisations.

In a collection of recollections published in 2002, Yuri Tskhai, then president of the Association of Koreans of Kazakhstan, described Kim as an adviser who regularly discussed community initiatives with the association's leadership.

Tskhai also recalled that Kim encouraged educated members of the Korean community to pursue careers in public institutions rather than concentrating exclusively on business.

Gennady Ni, vice-president of the Dostar holding company, stated that Kim had participated in the revival of organised Korean cultural activities in Kazakhstan.

Ni described his involvement in the Association of Koreans of Kazakhstan and his willingness to provide legal and practical advice to community representatives.

A 2020 article by Radio Azattyq also identified Kim as one of the influential figures within Kazakhstan's Korean community during the post-Soviet period.

== Personal life ==
Kim was married to Nadezhda Kim, a Kazakhstani diplomat.

Following her husband's death, she served as first secretary at the Embassy of Kazakhstan in the Republic of Korea.

In an interview published in November 2002, Nadezhda stated that the couple had no children together, although they had children within their family. The interview did not specify the children's names or their exact relationships to the couple.

She recalled that Kim maintained close contact with relatives and friends, remembered birthdays and important personal occasions, and encouraged her to continue her professional career.

Her recollections also described his final illness and the support he attempted to provide to family members during that period.

Information about Kim's parents and siblings has not been established in the principal published biographical sources.

== Sporting achievements ==
Kim practised wrestling and earned the Soviet title of Master of Sport.

Gennady Ni referred to this achievement in his recollections of Kim's life and career.

== Illness and death ==
Kim died on 15 November 2000 in Astana, aged 60.

According to Gennady Ni, Kim was seriously ill during the final months of his life.

Preparations had been made for a celebration of his 60th birthday in July 2000, but the planned event was reduced in scale because of his deteriorating health.

Ni recalled that approximately 5,000 people attended Kim's funeral, including students from law schools in Almaty.

He was buried in Almaty.

== Tributes and recollections ==
On 15 November 2002, the newspaper Novoye Pokoleniye published an article by journalist Galina Galkina entitled He Was a Judge for All of Us.

The article brought together recollections from Kim's widow, former colleagues and representatives of Kazakhstan's legal and Korean communities.

=== Zagipa Baliyeva ===
Zagipa Baliyeva, who succeeded Kim as chair of the Central Election Commission, recalled his professional knowledge and his willingness to assist colleagues.

She described him as an important figure in the development of Kazakhstan's legal institutions during the early years of independence.

=== Maksut Narikbayev ===
Maksut Narikbayev, a former Prosecutor General of Kazakhstan and head of the Kazakh Humanitarian Law University, recalled working under Kim in the Ministry of Justice during the late 1980s.

He highlighted Kim's experience in the lower levels of the judicial system and his approach to legal and administrative disputes.

Narikbayev also recalled Kim's support for the status of the Kazakh language in the national legal framework.

=== Representatives of the Korean community ===
Yuri Tskhai and Gennady Ni described Kim's role within the Association of Koreans of Kazakhstan and his engagement with cultural initiatives.

Their recollections presented him as an accessible adviser to community organisations and a supporter of public service.

== Honours and commemoration ==
Kim received the honorary title of Honoured Lawyer of the Republic of Kazakhstan in recognition of his legal career.

On 23 January 2001, the Government of Kazakhstan adopted Resolution No. 110, entitled On Perpetuating the Memory of the Honoured Lawyer of the Republic of Kazakhstan Yuri Alekseyevich Kim.

The resolution instructed the mayor of Almaty to arrange:

- The installation of a monument at Kim's grave.
- The naming of a street in Almaty in his honour.
- The installation of a commemorative plaque at 36a Zein Shashkin Street in Almaty.

The former Studencheskaya Street in Almaty was subsequently renamed in his honour.

Following his death, Maksut Narikbayev proposed the establishment of a scholarship bearing Kim's name at the Kazakh Humanitarian Law University.

According to Narikbayev, the scholarship was intended to recognise law students who distinguished themselves through academic achievement and participation in university life.

== See also ==
- Constitutional Council of Kazakhstan
- Central Election Commission of Kazakhstan
- Constitution of Kazakhstan
- Koryo-saram
- Politics of Kazakhstan
