= Constitutional Court of Kazakhstan =

Kazakhstan government agency

Constitutional Court of the Republic of Kazakhstan
- Қазақстан Республикасының Конституциялық Соты (Kazakh); Конституционный Суд Республики Казахстан (Russian)
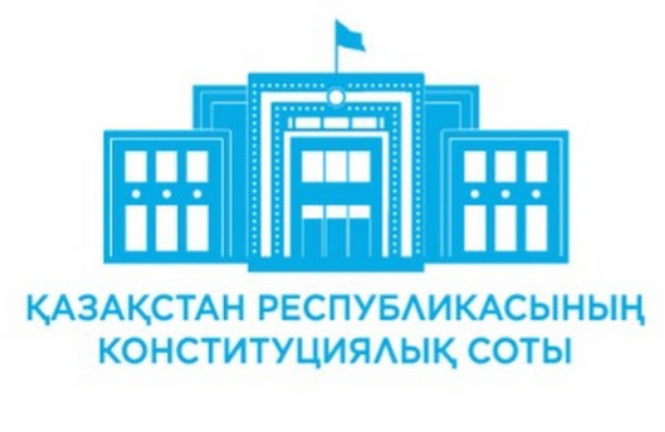
- Interactive map of Constitutional Court of the Republic of Kazakhstan
- 51.119252°N 71.433942°E
- Established: 1992, 2023 (re-established)
- Dissolved: 1995 (later re-established)
- Location: 13 Mäñgılık Avenue, Astana
- Coordinates: 51.119252°N 71.433942°E
- Annual budget: 1.7 billion tenge (2025)

Chair Kazakh: Төрайым (Töraiym) Russian: Председательница (Predsedatelnitsa)
- Currently: Elvira Äzimova

Constitutional Court of the Republic of Kazakhstan (Kazakh: Қазақстан Республикасының Конституциялық Соты; Russian: Конституционный Суд Республики Казахстан) is a state body outside Kazakhstan's judicial system that is responsible for the upholding of the Constitution of Kazakhstan.

== History ==
In 1989, the Constitutional Observation Committee to regulate the constitutionality in the Kazakh SSR was planned to be created. However, the state body was eventually not established.

The law "On the State Independence of the Republic of Kazakhstan" of 16 December 1991 highlighted the Constitutional Court of Kazakhstan to be the highest state body to uphold Kazakh law. On 6 June 1992, the law "On the Constitutional Court of the Republic of Kazakhstan" officially established the body. The Supreme Council of Kazakhstan elected its members on 2 July 1992 and the court existed until 1995. Its 11 members included one chair and ten judges. The court's first and then-only chair was Murat Baimaqanov.

In March 1995, the Constitutional Court found the election of the Supreme Council to be illegitimate, and dissolved it. On August of the same year, a new Constitution was implemented through a nationwide referendum. Because of this, the Court was dissolved. In February 1996, the Constitutional Council of Kazakhstan was established instead of the Court as according to the new Constitution.

In June 2022, a constitutional referendum was approved in Kazakhstan. As part of the new amendments, the Constitutional Court was re-established on 1 January 2023.

== Powers ==
As described in the Constitution of Kazakhstan, the Court "shall be independent and separate from citizens, organizations, state bodies, officials", guided by the Constitution and the Law "On the Constitutional Court of the Republic of Kazakhstan", "refrain from establishing, examining, and verifying other issues in all cases when they are under the jurisdiction of the courts or other state bodies".

== Composition ==
The Constitutional Court of Kazakhstan is composed of eleven judges, including the Chair and the Deputy Chair. The Chair is appointed by the President of the Republic of Kazakhstan with the consent of the Senate. The Deputy Chair is appointed by the President upon the nomination of the Chair from among the sitting judges of the Court.

In addition to these leadership positions, four judges are appointed directly by the President. The remaining three judges are appointed by the Senate and the Mäjilis of the Parliament of Kazakhstan, based on nominations submitted by the Chairs of the respective chambers.

=== Court chairship ===
The Constitutional Court is headed by the Chair, who oversees the organisation of the Court's work, presides over its sessions, and ensures adherence to constitutional procedures. The Chair is appointed by the President with the consent of the Senate, while the Deputy Chair is appointed by the President upon the nomination of the Chair from among the sitting judges. Both the Chair and Deputy Chair hold senior public office as defined by the Constitution and the Constitutional Law.

==== List of chairs ====
- Murat Baimaqanov (2 July 1992 – 19 October 1995)
- Elvira Äzimova (since 9 January 2023)

=== Judges ===
Judges of the Constitutional Court are senior public officials whose status is defined by the Constitution and the Constitutional Law. They may not hold a parliamentary mandate or occupy other paid positions, except for teaching, scientific, or other creative activities. They are also prohibited from engaging in entrepreneurial activity or serving on the governing bodies of commercial organisations. Judges must not be members of political parties or trade unions, nor may they publicly support any political party. If an appointed judge holds such membership, it must be terminated within ten days.

Candidates for appointment as judges must be citizens of Kazakhstan at least forty years of age, hold a higher legal education, possess a high level of legal qualification, maintain an impeccable reputation, and have no fewer than fifteen years of legal experience. The Chair and judges serve a single eight-year term, and reappointment is not permitted. If a judge's powers are terminated early, the vacancy is filled according to the procedure established by the Constitution and the Constitutional Law.

The full composition of the Constitutional Court, formed at the end of 2022 and effective from 1 January 2023, included judges appointed by the President, the Senate, and the Mäjilis. The appointees represented a mix of legal scholars, senior civil servants, and former Supreme Court judges as presented below:

Judge	Alma mater	Nominated by	Start date / length of service	Age at start / present		Background
Chair; Elvira Azimova (b. 1973)	Ahmet Yassawi University	President Kassym-Jomart Tokayev	9 January 2023; 3 years, 266 days	50	53	Lawyer, civil servant
Deputy President; Baqyt Nurmuhanov (b. 1979)	East Kazakhstan State University	Kassym-Jomart Tokayev	1 January 2023; 3 years, 266 days	43	47	Lawyer, judge
Asan Eskendirov (b. 1971)	Karagandy State University	Senate	1 January 2023; 3 years, 266 days	51	55	Judge
Qairat Jaqypbaev (b. 1964)	Al-Farabi Kazakh National University	Kassym-Jomart Tokayev	1 January 2023; 3 years, 266 days	49	62	Judge, prosecutor
Aijan Jatqanbaeva (b. 1972)	Al-Farabi Kazakh National University	Kassym-Jomart Tokayev	1 January 2023; 3 years, 266 days	51	53	University professor, lawyer
Aigül Qydyrbaeva (b. 1967)	Unknown	Senate	1 January 2023; 3 years, 266 days	48	51	Judge, lawyer
Qanat Musin (b. 1966)	Karagandy State University	Mäjilis	1 January 2023; 3 years, 266 days	56	60	Judge, civil servant
Erkin Oñğarbaev (b. 1961)	Karaganda Academy of the Ministry of Internal Affairs of the Republic of Kazakhstan	Mäjilis	1 January 2023; 3 years, 266 days	61	65	University rector, lawyer
Roman Podoprigora (b. 1966)	Al-Farabi Kazakh National University	Kassym-Jomart Tokayev	1 January 2023; 3 years, 266 days	56	60	University professor, lawyer
Sergey Udartsev (b. 1951)	Al-Farabi Kazakh National University	Mäjilis	1 January 2023; 3 years, 266 days	56	75	University professor, lawyer
