= 2022 Kazakh constitutional referendum =

Republican referendum in Kazakhstan

- 5 June 2022
- "Do you accept amendments and additions to the Constitution of the Republic of Kazakhstan set forth in the draft Law of the Republic of Kazakhstan On Amendments and Additions to the Constitution of the Republic of Kazakhstan, published in the media on 6 May 2022?"

Results
| Choice | Votes | % |
|---|---|---|
| Yes | 6,163,516 | 77.18% |
| No | 1,490,470 | 18.66% |
| Blank votes | 205,924 | 2.58% |
| Other | 125,859 | 1.58% |
| Valid votes | 7,985,769 | 100.00% |
| Invalid votes | 205,924 | 2.58% |
| Total votes | 7,985,769 | 100.00% |
| Registered voters/turnout | 11,734,642 | 68.05% |
- Results by region

A constitutional referendum, locally called the republican referendum (Kazakh: Республикалық референдум, romanized: Respublikalyq referendum; Russian: Республиканский референдум, romanized: Respublikanskiy referendum), was held in Kazakhstan on 5 June 2022. It was the third referendum since Kazakhstan's independence in 1991, and the first since the 1995 referendum that established the second constitution. The amendments followed violent civil unrest in early January caused by worsening economic conditions and subsequent calls for rapid political reform. The referendum changed 33 of the document's 98 articles. Political commentators assessed that amendments would lessen the influence of the executive branch, grant more powers to the Parliament, and eliminate the powers that former president Nursultan Nazarbayev had retained after resigning from office in 2019.

President Kassym-Jomart Tokayev unveiled the proposed amendments during his early State of the Nation Address in March 2022. After Tokayev's announcements, he subsequently formed a working group in forming proposals for the constitutional changes along with the Parliament and in April 2022, the proposed amendments to the constitution were submitted to the Constitutional Council for approval. During the drafting of the amendments, several controversial changes were proposed by deputies and Kazakh officials regarding the exclusion of Russian from being a co-official language along with Kazakh; most notably, an early proposal to grant former president Nazarbayev the new honorary title as the "founder of independent Kazakhstan", along with other privileges, faced a public backlash and was eventually scrapped. On 29 April, President Tokayev raised the idea of holding a Republican Referendum to approve the changes and additions made to the constitution. In early May, with the approval by the Constitutional Council, the Parliament adopted a draft package of constitutional amendments and additions. As the Parliament ratified a final revision on 5 May, Tokayev approved the draft and set the referendum date in a presidential decree.

Throughout the campaign, the amendments as well as the holding of a referendum were endorsed by various pro-government political parties, state institutions, NGOs, public figures, and statesmen, including former president Nazarbayev himself. Although the referendum lacked a unified "No" campaign, civil activists and opposition groups criticized it for the financial cost of the referendum, short timeframe for campaigning, and a lack of dialogue between the Kazakh government and citizens during drafting. Critics argued that the amendments would change little in Kazakh politics and instead simply bolster President Tokayev's potential second term ambitions.

To be approved, the proposed amendments had to garner the absolute majority of all votes, including blank and invalid ones, on the national level as well as in two-thirds of the 17 regions and autonomous cities, and a minimum turnout of 50% of registered voters. The Central Election Commission (OSK) in the evening of 5 June reported a preliminary turnout of 68.4% shortly after polls had closed. Exit polls, published in the mass media at midnight on 6 June during the coverage of the referendum, indicated that more than 74% of Kazakh voters supported the constitutional changes. In the following morning, the OSK announced that voters approved 56 amendments to the Constitution of Kazakhstan, with the overall final results published on 7 June showing 77.2% of the voters in favour and 18.7% opposed.

== Background ==
The 1995 Constitution of Kazakhstan has been in flux since Nursultan Nazarbayev's presidency in the early 1990s. During his first term in office, Nazarbayev dissolved the Supreme Council of Kazakhstan and oversaw the August 1995 constitutional referendum which greatly expanded his executive powers. The political opposition boycotted the August 1995 referendum; local observers claimed that the final results, which saw 90% of voters approve the changes, had been falsified. As a result of the referendum, Nazarbayev gained the right to dissolve the parliament; because the Constitutional Court of Kazakhstan became a purely advisory body, Nazarbayev could amend the constitution virtually at will and rule in an authoritarian manner.

Amidst the colour revolutions that took place in former Soviet republics, several opposition parties in late 2004 established the Coordinating Council of Democratic Forces of Kazakhstan, led by former Mazhilis chairman Zharmakhan Tuyakbay. The Coordinating Council aimed at implementing political reforms and drafted its own proposed Kazakh constitution prior to the 2005 presidential elections. However, police confiscated the leaflets to promote the project in August 2005 prior to distribution. Nevertheless, Tuyakbay, the leading opposition figure in the presidential race against Nazarbayev, campaigned for a new constitution with a one-presidential-term limit and a ban on the incumbent president's relatives from holding political offices. Nazarbayev would comfortably win the 2005 election, and any hope of reform died when Tuyakbay refused to recognise the official results and unsuccessfully sought to overturn the election.

Following the Zhanaozen massacre and 2012 legislative elections, Tuyakbay, who headed the opposition Nationwide Social Democratic Party at that time, suggested a nationwide Kurultai (political council) in autumn of 2012 to discuss political reforms and constitutional amendments on "organisational, technical, ideological issues"; this proposal did not come to fruition.

In 2017, President Nazarbayev proposed constitutional reforms that for the first time transferred powers away from the executive, granting them instead to parliament. Observers noted that the changes did not meaningfully enhance political pluralism, but could ensure a smooth political succession whenever Nazarbayev stepped down. However, by the late 2010s, political activism in Kazakh civil society and on social media had grown substantially.

After President Nazarbayev's resignation in March 2019, public pressure grew for the new President Kassym-Jomart Tokayev to implement liberal reforms. Former Supreme Soviet of the Kazakh SSR chairman Serikbolsyn Abdildin, supported a return to the 1993 Kazakh constitution he had authored. During the 2019 presidential elections, both candidates Amirjan Qosanov and Sadibek Tügel called for constitutional changes in their campaigns: Qosanov advocated shifting to a president-parliamentary system while Tügel proposed drafting an entirely new Kazakh constitution to promote the "democratic values that have always existed in the steppe." In August 2019 during Constitution Day, activists of the "Oyan, Qazaqstan!" movement held a march in Almaty demanding reforms toward a parliamentary system. The Ak Zhol Democratic Party in its electoral programme for the 2021 legislative elections called for a "phased transition from the presidential to a parliamentary system" as well. But political analysts believed that the President Tokayev had little interest in reforming the constitution. His predecessor Nazarbayev still possessed various influential state posts, most notably the Supreme Council chairmanship, and Tokayev seemed to have minimal de facto autonomy.

=== January 2022 unrest ===
As protests broke out in the city of Zhanaozen initially over a sharp increase in liquefied petroleum gas prices in early January, massive discontent quickly spread throughout Kazakhstan. Demonstrators insisted that the government had repeatedly ignored the declining standard of living of Kazakh citizens. They demanded economic, social, and–more importantly–political reforms, ranging from a full parliamentary system with an executive prime minister to simply a return to the previous 1993 constitution that retained stronger checks and balances.

President Tokayev initially did little to appease the demonstrations, encouraging the public not to disturb public order and instructing the government to examine the growing situation in Zhanaozen. However, the protests eventually erupted into unrest in Almaty, with violent confrontations between demonstrators and the police. Tokayev had pleaded for calm during a televised address where he announced that all legitimate demands by the protesters would be considered and urged the public not to succumb to provocations.

With the protests seemingly continuing unabated, Tokayev enacted a nationwide state of emergency and sacked the government led by Prime Minister Asqar Mamin. Tokayev also dismissed former president Nazarbayev from his leading role as the Security Council chairman, centralizing power in his person. Tokayev then suppressed the riots with government and allied Collective Security Treaty Organization (CSTO) troops, leaving official estimates of hundreds dead and over $2 billion worth of damages.

In the aftermath, President Tokayev addressed the lower house of the legislature, the Mazhilis, on 11 January 2022. He announced a new package of political reforms that would be prepared "on the basis of a broad and constructive dialogue with civil society and experts," and be presented in the upcoming annual State of the Nation Address originally intended for September 2022. Tokayev later during a meeting with foreign ambassadors in February 2022 reiterated that he would not seek "revenge or polarisation" for the unrest and that his administration would implement "large-scale political and economic reforms".

Despite Tokayev's conciliatory remarks, the Human Rights Watch continued to report numerous cases of prison torture, ill-treatment and custody deaths towards both Kazakh protestors and bystanders.

== Legislative drafting of the amendments ==
Kazakh society widely discussed possible reforms that President Tokayev could propose. Prominent political scientists, politicians and public figures suggested changes to the structure of the parliament, the electoral system, and the role of opposition parties. On 29 January 2022, in an interview with Khabar Agency, President Tokayev revealed that he was "seriously thinking" about reforming "parliamentary and party system" in Kazakhstan and hoped to serve as a "magnet that brings different social and political forces to a common mark on their position".

In early February 2022, it was reported that President Tokayev would unveil a package of political reforms in an earlier scheduled State of the Nation Address around mid-March. Indeed, Tokayev's 16 March speech to Parliament described a series of constitutional amendments to democratize Kazakhstan where he proposed:

- Revising the powers of the president with a transition from a super-presidential system to a presidential republic with a strong Parliament;
- Prohibit the president from holding membership in any political party while holding office, and to prohibit akims and their deputies from holding positions in the party's branches;
- Prohibit judges, representatives of the Central Election Commission, the state auditing committee, military personnel, and employees of national security and law enforcement agencies from holding membership in any political party or endorsing any political party;
- Prohibit the president from overriding the orders of akims of oblasts, major cities, or the capital;
- A ban on the incumbent president's nearest relatives on holding top-level state positions;
- Reducing the number of seats appointed by the president in the Senate of Kazakhstan from 15 to 10 members, and increasing the number of seats in the chamber from 49 to 54, with the extra five seats being decided by the Assembly of People of Kazakhstan, as their guaranteed nine-seat presence in the lower house Mazhilis would be abolished;
- Reducing the number of members in the Mazhilis from 107 to 98;
- Reducing the powers of the Senate in drafting laws;
- Transition from full proportional representation to a mixed-member majoritarian representation electoral system, with 70% of Mazhilis MPs elected proportionally from party-lists and the remaining 30% from single-member electoral districts;
- Direct elections of akims of major cities and the capital (although candidates will be chosen by the president);
- Presidential appointments of akims of oblasts will be subject to a vote of the regional assembly;
- Creation of three new oblasts (ultimately performed by presidential decree outside the referendum process); and
- Reestablishment of the Constitutional Court.

Tokayev's proposals were met with mixed reactions in public society and on social media. Some welcomed lesser presidential dominance in politics while others reiterated that newly announced reforms are simply "cosmetic" and would bring no rapid changes to Kazakhstan's political system, noting that Tokayev would still retain many of the existing executive powers. U.S. diplomat Uzra Zeya, serving as an Under-Secretary for Civilian Security, Democracy, and Human Rights, during a meeting with Foreign Affairs Minister Mukhtar Tleuberdi in an April 2022 visit to Nur-Sultan, welcomed the proposed changes and expressed the United States' interest in assisting Kazakhstan on the full implementation of Tokayev's reforms.

On 22 April 2022, President Tokayev at a cabinet meeting announced that he had submitted the prepared amendments made by the working group to the Constitutional Council for a review, touting that well-known legal scholars, the Commissioner for Human Rights, representatives of parliament and state bodies took part in the drafting of the newly constitutional amendments. From there, Tokayev called on legislators to promptly consider the laws at a joint meeting of the Parliament and expressed his support for all changes proposed by the working group.

=== Preparations ===
Following the State of the Nation Address in March 2022, President Tokayev ordered the creation of a working group led by his own administration deputy head Erjan Jienbaev on 28 March, which would oversee the development of proposals for amendments and additions to the 1995 Constitution of Kazakhstan, with the group being instructed to form proposals within a month. Justice Minister Qanat Musin presented the National Plan, which included proposed changes to the constitution that were brought up by Tokayev in an address with development of a draft being set for completion in April 2022.

On 23 February 2022, Senate chairman Mäulen Äşimbaev, in an interview with YouTube channel НеКурултай, commented on the work towards new reforms, and announced that the School of Analytics and Club of Young Experts–a platform formed under the Senate which assists in drafting bills–was working to bring about a New Kazakhstan. Äşimbaev asserted that the Senate will do "everything necessary" to support Tokayev's policies, including enact reforms. In response to Tokayev's State of the Nation Address, Äşimbaev called the main goals of constitutional reforms to "increase the involvement of citizens in decision-making processes at all levels and to improve the well-being of Kazakhstanis", pledging for the Senate to adopt laws after lawmakers hold discussions with experts and public figures, as well opinions made by citizens.

Chairman of the lower house Mazhilis, Erlan Qoşanov, called on all MPs to join the work on implementing constitutional changes, noting the importance of individual legislators' initiative in drafting amendments. He also suggested for the Mazhilis become a platform for dialogue with the public and government agencies, beyond just the State of the Nation address.

=== Controversial proposals ===
==== Elbasy status ====
After the January 2022 unrest revealed that Nursultan Nazarbayev's public reputation had decayed, Parliament on 2 February 2022 voted to strip the powers Nazarbayev had retained after resigning as president, including lifetime chairmanship of Security Council and the Assembly of People, as well as veto power over important areas of domestic and foreign policies. Despite the legislation, Nazarbayev retained the right to address parliament and attend government meetings when discussing important issues, as well as sessions of the Constitutional Council. He also controversially retained the status of "Elbasy" ("leader of the nation"), a constitutional law originally adopted in 2000, which granted him and his family a special immunity from prosecution in a 2010 amendment. Mazhilis chairman Erlan Qoşanov refused to change the import of Elbasy status, and Justice Minister Qanat Musin in April 2022 also dismissed any possibilities for the ministry itself to amend the law, noting that the decision would be left up to parliamentarians.

On 25 April 2022 during the briefing of the Central Communications Service, Ermek Äbdirasylov, a working group member for the constitutional reforms, suggested to introduce a new special title on former president Nazarbayev as the "founder of independent Kazakhstan" in which he insisted that it would be "enshrined in the Constitution". This proposal sparked huge backlash among critics and public figures; most notably, Olzhas Suleimenov argued that Nazarbayev wasn't solely responsible for Kazakhstan's independence and that its sovereignty instead was automatic following the dissolution of the Soviet Union in 1991. On 27 April, Mazhilis chairman Erlan Qoşanov announced that the law "On the First President of the Republic of Kazakhstan – Elbasy" will be fully abolished and that Nazarbayev would remain as the "founder of independent Kazakhstan", although not ruling out that the proposal will be taken into account by opinion of the population. On 4 May 2022, State Secretary Erlan Karin revealed that some members of the working group for the constitutional reforms had reversed its decision in granting Nazarbayev a newly proposed status. According to Karin, the working group considered it "unnecessary" to tether "Nazarbayev's historical role" to the Constitution, and would not mention Nazarbayev in the document. Marat Bäşimov, Director of the European Institute of Human Rights and a working group member, described the choice to remove Nazarbayev's proposed special status as due to "very serious public controversy" and that it did not merit "a special legal consolidation," acclaiming the working group's decision as "a democratic direction of the state of constitutional reform."

==== Official derecognition of the Russian language ====
On 1 May 2022, Ak Zhol Democratic Party MP Qazybek Isa allegedly suggested during a parliamentary inquiry "On the State Language" to exclude Russian and leave Kazakh as the sole recognised official language of Kazakhstan. Isa stated that 36 lawmakers favoured the proposed change and claimed that not having the knowledge of a native language makes a person "spiritually disabled", using Japan as example of a developed country where children learn the native Japanese language. He also assessed that the claims of poor performance in Kazakh-speaking schools were a myth; on the contrary, most participants in international olympiads attend those schools. That same day, a video surfaced online showing Isa along with other legislators meeting with parents of schoolchildren in Nur-Sultan, where they attempted to convince them to make their children study only in Kazakh.

In a written response on Facebook to reports which quickly gained traction, Isa insisted that his statements were taken out of context and that his proposed intention was only to strengthen the current use of Kazakh in public. Furthermore, in an interview to KazTAG, Isa reiterated that his remarks on excluding Russian referred to invalidating the 2011 "Letter 138" proposal. Although Isa had been part of drafting that proposal, and had reproposed it as recently as in 2019. Ak Zhol party chairman Azat Peruashev cited the controversy as an example of "how fakes appear", later saying that "Russian-speaking people have no problems with appeals to state bodies. I tell you this myself as a Russian-speaking Kazakh."

Isa's remarks nevertheless prompted wide discussion on social media regarding the use of Russian in Kazakhstan. Ziyabek Qabuldinov, a doctorate of historical sciences, argued in favour of teaching Kazakh to ensure its linguistic vitality. Qabuldinov did not address whether Russian was widely used in public spheres because the Kazakh language is not fully developed enough to describe everyday life.

== Calls for a Republican Referendum ==
In Kazakhstan, a constitutional referendum is defined as a Republican Referendum (Kazakh: Республикалық референдум, romanized: Respublikalyq referendum). Republican Referendum are defined in a special section ("On Republican Referendum") of the 1995 Constitution, which describes them as:

"A national vote on drafts of the Constitution, constitutional laws, laws and decisions on other most important issues of the public life in the Republic of Kazakhstan."

Eligibility is determined by Article 5 of "On Republican Referendum," which states that any citizen of the Republic of Kazakhstan who is at least 18 years or older and has not been declared incapable by the judicial court nor kept in confinement under the court's sentence may participate in the referendum on an equal basis.

=== Announcement ===
Article 10 of the Constitutional Law "On Republican Referendum" states that the right in calling a Republican Referendum is reserved only to the president of Kazakhstan, although Parliament, government officials, or at least 200,000 citizens representing all regions of the republic can request the president hold such a referendum. In Article 17, the president is entitled to either call a referendum as requested, makes changes and additions to the constitution without conducting a referendum, or fully reject the proposed amendments, which may be overridden in a fourth-fifths majority vote by both houses of the Parliament.

On the eve of the People's Unity Day during the 31st Session of the Assembly of People of Kazakhstan held on 29 April 2022, President Tokayev proposed to hold a republican referendum on drafted amendments to the second constitution of Kazakhstan for the first time since 1995. According to Tokayev, the reasoning in holding a direct suffrage was due to "large-scale and significant changes" that would determine Kazakhstan's future upon the ratification of the constitutional amendments, adding that it would present a "vivid demonstration of the will of the people". He also reminisced that this would be the first Republican Referendum.

Dmitry Fetisov, a Russian political scientist from Izvestia, suggested that Tokayev decided to hold a referendum to compete with neighbouring Uzbekistan for Western approval and that a direct vote by the citizens on amending the constitution would solve several problems in "changing the structure of clans in the republic". While other Kazakh political experts suggested that the reasoning for a referendum was due to Tokayev's distrust of the Parliament.

Many political parties welcomed the decision to hold a Republican Referendum. Senator and chairman of the Auyl People's Democratic Patriotic Party Äli Bektaev described the move as a "right and just decision in terms of legal, political equality and even national security." Azat Peruashev, member of the Mazhilis and Ak Zhol Democratic Party chairman, assessed that a referendum is "the only right step in a situation where the initiated political reforms need to unite the citizens of the republic and enlist the support of not only the parliament, but also the entire people of the country." People's Party of Kazakhstan MP Erlan Smaiylov said that every Kazakh citizen would be "involved in historical changes towards real democratisation." Mazhilis chairman and newly elected leader of the ruling Amanat (formerly Nur Otan) party Erlan Qoşanov called Tokayev's suggestion a "historical decision that has been thoroughly analyzed", stressing the importance of the public taking part the referendum.

=== Parliamentary vote ===
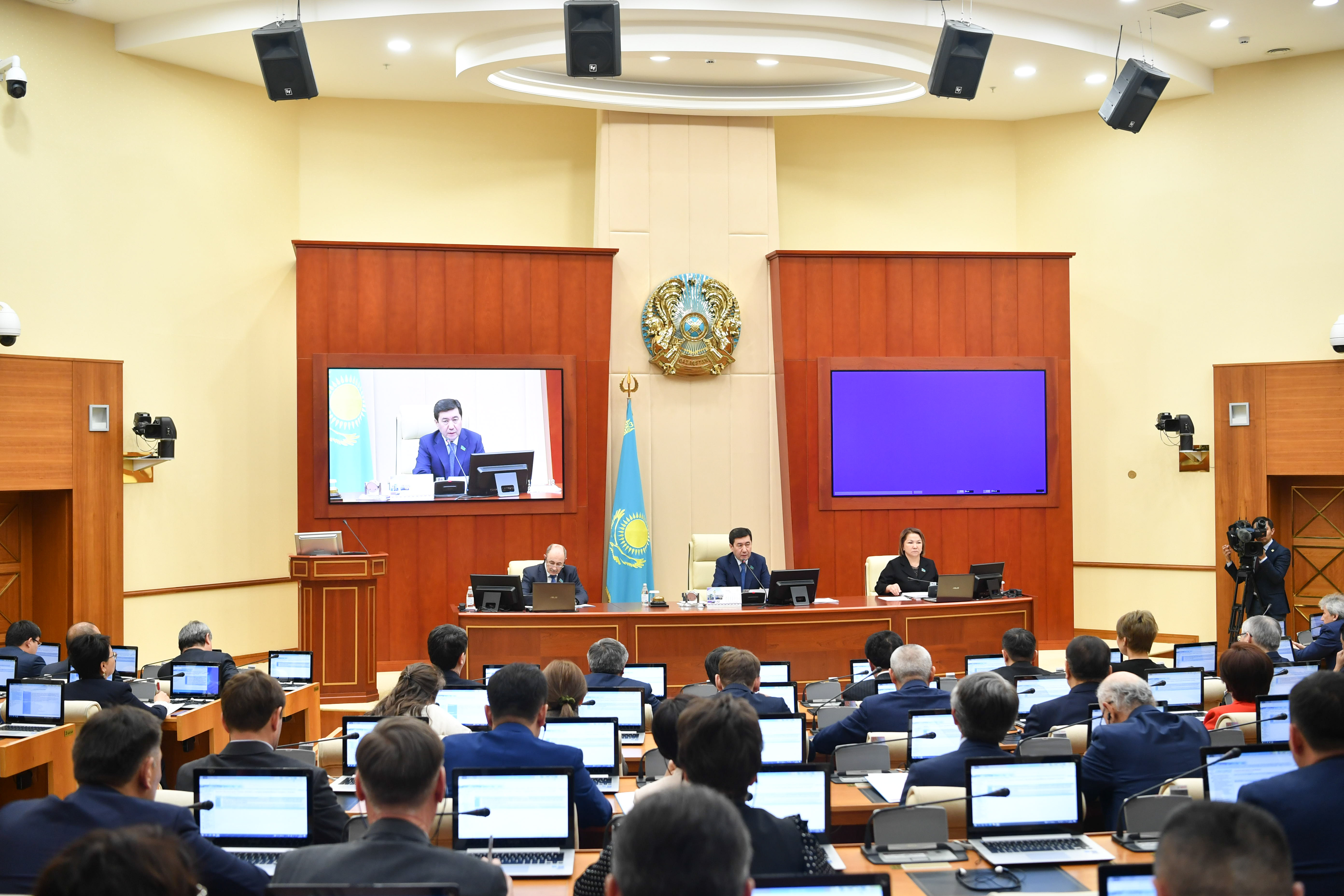
Plenary session of the Mazhilis where the MPs adopted a finalised revision of the constitutional law, 5 May 2022

First phase (4 May 2022)

On 4 May, the lower house Mäjilis held a hearing regarding holding of a referendum on the constitutional amendments. All 98 deputies voted to support the proposed draft amendments. According Mäjilis chairman Erlan Qoşanov stated that the bill would not change the "content of the law on the referendum", asserting that the amendments have "a clarifying nature"; Mäjilis deputy Berik Bekjanov explained that the bill was necessary "to unite the forms of ballots used in the referendum".

Summary of the Mäjilis vote on amendments to the Constitutional Law "On Republican Referenda" (4 May 2022)
| For | Against | Abstained | Absent |
| 98 | 0 | 0 | 9 |

Second phase (5 May 2022)

The Senate, on 5 May, returned the bill to the Mäjilis; Senator Andrey Lukin explained that the unacceptable provisions regarded former president Nursultan Nazarbayev's status, which the Senate believed could not be questioned in a Republican Referendum. In the Senate's view Republican Referenda could only change "the independence of the state, the unitary and territorial integrity of the republic, the form of its government, [or] the fundamental principles of the republic's activities."

Following the Senate's motion, the Mäjilis in held a second hearing where 96 MPs unanimously to proceed with the Senate proposal.

Summary of the Mäjilis vote on amendments to the Constitutional Law "On Republican Referenda" (5 May 2022)
| For | Against | Abstained | Absent |
| 96 | 0 | 0 | 11 |

=== Enactment ===
In accordance with Article 18 of the Constitutional Law "On Republican Referenda", a decision to hold a referendum is established by a presidential decree, which sets the date for the vote, the issue(s) included in referendum and its consequences. The wording of a draft to the constitution, the Constitutional Law, as well as its amendments are then subsequently published in mass media. The date for holding a referendum is denoted in Article 19 which stipulates that the vote must be conducted no earlier than one month and no later than three months after the decree. The Article also provides exceptional cases where the president may establish other terms for the referendum to be conducted.

Chairman of the Mazhilis Committee on Legislation and Judicial and Legal Reform Arman Qojahmetov forecast Sunday, 5 June 2022 as a feasible date for the referendum. On 5 May 2022, President Tokayev recognized the parliamentary bill proposing new amendments and signed a decree setting 5 June 2022 as the date for the Republican Referendum to be held. The 1–3-month constitutional restriction had limited his options to 5 June (at the earliest) and 5 August (at the latest).

In a televised address on the day of signing the decree, Tokayev stated that the amendments to the constitution would mark "a new stage in the development" of Kazakhstan, urging everyone to take part in the "historic event" that would define the future of Kazakhstan and its generations, reaffirming the commitment in building a New Kazakhstan. From there, Tokayev outlined the changes that would be included in the constitution.

==== Ballot question ====
Under President Tokayev's enacted decree "On holding a Republican Referendum on 5 June 2022", the referendum question would appear on a ballot both in Kazakh and Russian. The full details of the decree as well as the final draft of the law "On Amendments and Additions to the Constitution of the Republic of Kazakhstan" would be published in mass media the following day (on 6 May 2022). The final draft proposed a total of 56 amendments to 33 articles of the 1995 Kazakh Constitution, amounting to one-thirds of the changes in the entire document.

Regarding having a one single question on a ballot for all amendments, Vice Minister of Justice Alma Mūqanova argued that 56 individual ballots for each elector would be impractical, and stressed that the amendments were "closely intertwined and interrelated." Mūqanova suggested Kazakh citizens carefully consider themselves whether they are more for or against current norms and cast their vote based on their overall general opinion of the amendments.

Question on a referendum ballot
| English (Unofficial translation) | Kazakh | Russian |
|---|---|---|
| Do you accept amendments and additions to the Constitution of the Republic of Kazakhstan set forth in the draft Law of the Republic of Kazakhstan "On Amendments and Additions to the Constitution of the Republic of Kazakhstan", published in the media on 6 May 2022? | 2022 жылғы 6 мамырда бұқаралық ақпарат құралдарында жарияланған «Қазақстан Республикасының Конституциясына өзгерістер мен толықтырулар енгізу туралы» Қазақстан Республикасы Заңының жобасында баяндалған Қазақстан Республикасының Конституциясына өзгерістер мен толықтыруларды қабылдайсыз ба? (in Cyrillic script) | Принимаете ли Вы изменения и дополнения в Конституцию Республики Казахстан, изложенные в проекте Закона Республики Казахстан «О внесении изменений и дополнений в Конституцию Республики Казахстан», опубликованном в средствах массовой информации 6 мая 2022 года? |
| Do you accept amendments and additions to the Constitution of the Republic of Kazakhstan set forth in the draft Law of the Republic of Kazakhstan "On Amendments and Additions to the Constitution of the Republic of Kazakhstan", published in the media on 6 May 2022? | 2022 jylğy 6 mamyrda būqaralyq aqparat qūraldarynda jarialanğan «Qazaqstan Respublikasynyñ Konstitutsiasyna özgerıster men tolyqtyrular engızu turaly» Qazaqstan Respublikasy Zañynyñ jobasynda baiandalğan Qazaqstan Respublikasynyñ Konstitutsiasyna özgerıster men tolyqtyrulardy qabyldaisyz ba? (in Latin script) | Принимаете ли Вы изменения и дополнения в Конституцию Республики Казахстан, изложенные в проекте Закона Республики Казахстан «О внесении изменений и дополнений в Конституцию Республики Казахстан», опубликованном в средствах массовой информации 6 мая 2022 года? |

== Campaign ==
Logo used in the referendum

Campaigning officially began on 6 May 2022 — the moment the presidential decree was signed — and would last until 4 June, 12:00 local time, which would be followed by the day of silence before voting takes place. That same day, the Central Election Commission (OSK) held a briefing whence OSK member Anastasia Shchegortsova noted that during the campaign, anonymous social media posts, calls for instability, and instigation of violence remained illegal. According to the chairman of the Information Committee under the Ministry of Information and Social Development Qanat Ysqaqov, any forms of publication on state media, social media posts, as well as texts on instant messengers would be considered campaigning.

On 17 May 2022, the Telegram channel coronavirus2020_kz, which previously published news and statistical data on the COVID-19 pandemic, was unexpectedly renamed into REFERENDUM2022.KZ, sparking confusion among users and losing some followers for a brief period. The newly rebranded channel would be served as an SMS newsletter that would publish information regarding the constitutional referendum.

During the campaign, several instances of misinformation regarding the proposed amendments and the conduct of the referendum sparked discussion on social media. These included calls for poll boycotts because voting would classify citizens as "plebeian" or "incapacitated" and hence transfer the right to vote to others, claims that the amendments would expropriate citizens' private property, claims that former president Nazarbayev and his family would be financially supported for life at taxpayer expense, and claims that Russian would be deprived as the state official language. These claims were all debunked by the Ministry of Justice and local fact-checkers.

=== In support ===
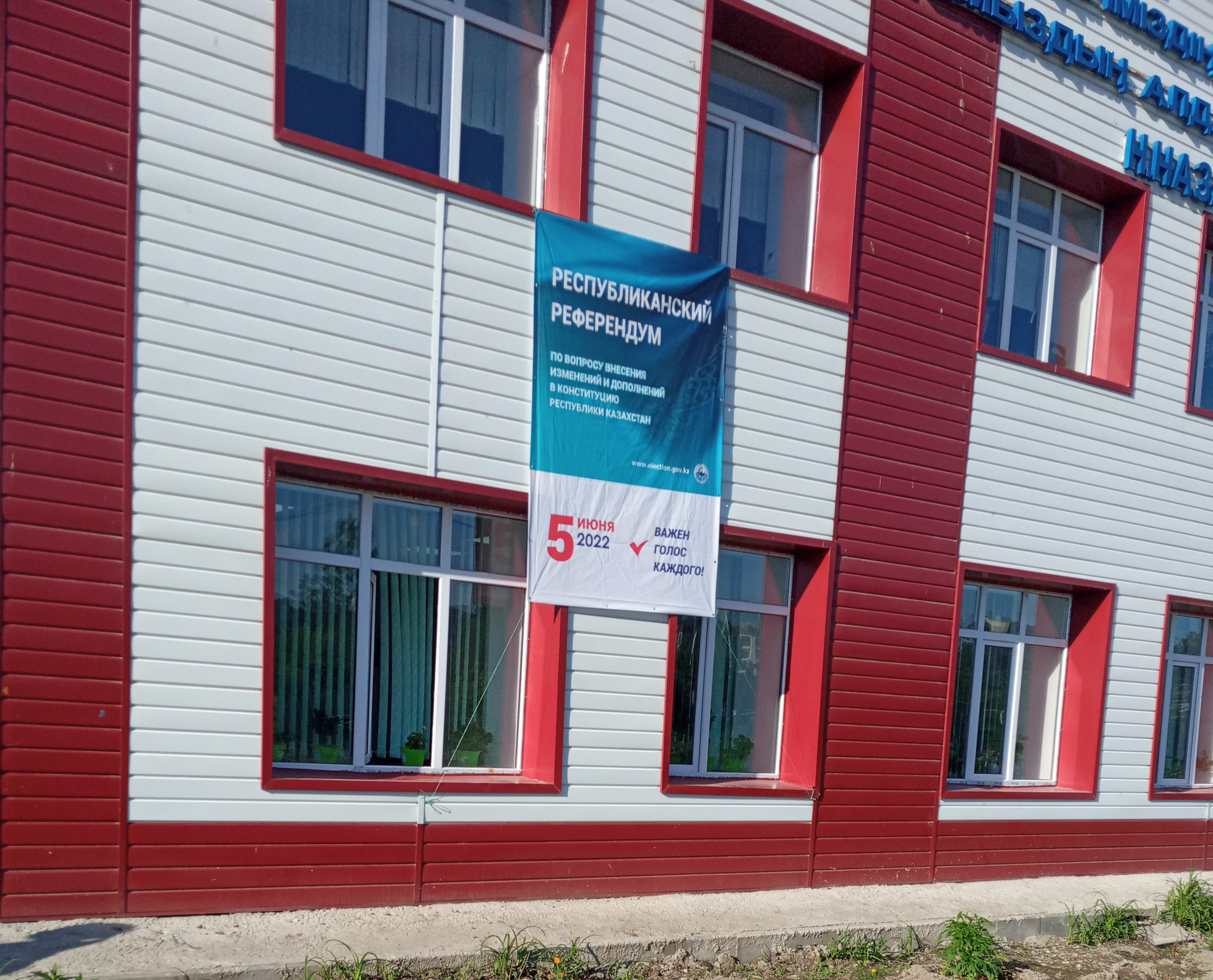
A campaign poster in Kulan at a lyceum school which served as a polling station No. 342, 17 May 2022

A national headquarters in support of the referendum was formed on 6 May 2022, which encompassed major public associations, industry associations and a number of political parties, specifically the Ak Zhol Democratic Party and Auyl People's Democratic Patriotic Party. Töleubek Muqaşev, chairing the headquarters, stressed that the amendments would help expand civic participation in Kazakhstani governance, provide effective mechanisms for the function of an "influential parliament", open the mäslihats (local assemblies) to citizens, and keep government officials accountable. Muqaşev claimed that the newly adopted changes to the constitution would lead to the development of "political pluralism and a competitive democratic environment" and that the organisation would campaign in all regions of Kazakhstan including remote parts of the country as well.

While visiting neighbouring Kyrgyzstan, President Tokayev at a 26 May 2022 press conference after meeting Kyrgyz President Sadyr Japarov emphasised that the referendum would mark a historic event for Kazakhstan, contending that while the presidential system would be preserved, the role and influence of the Parliament would be "significantly strengthened" and the "opinions and voices" of Kazakh citizens heard. Tokayev also pledged to not be endowed with "excessive powers and privileges".

Former President Nursultan Nazarbayev in an interview with political scientist Daniar Äşimbaev, announced his intention to take part in the referendum, reminiscing that the constitution is not "a frozen legal instrument, but a viable mechanism that reflects the life of Kazakhstan's society and the changes that are taking place there." Nazarbayev expressed his support for President Tokayev's proposed amendments, stating that "every generation has the right to amend the Constitution of the Father's Law" as a requirement for "the times and contributes to the progress and democratic development of society." Nazarbayev also noted that he transferred his presidential post to Tokayev as a personal decision and has in past actively supported his efforts "to reform and further develop" Kazakhstan and would continue in doing so.

On 1 June 2022, speaking at the session of the National Academy of Sciences, Tokayev assured that the changes to the constitution would not "prolong his power" for term of office as president in the way that Russian President Vladimir Putin has used the 2020 Russian constitutional referendum to "reset" his presidential term limits. Instead, Tokayev would abide by his past pledge to serve no more than two presidential terms. He also promised that referendum would not be the "last stage of Kazakhstan's political transformation" and that the reforms would continue taking place in the country.

==== Political parties ====
Amanat

At a meeting held on 6 May 2022, ruling Amanat party chairman Erlan Qoşanov expressed his support of the amendments as it would strengthen political competition and create new and equal opportunities for Kazakh citizens. According to Qoşanov, a national headquarters as well as 17 regional headquarters were established for the campaign.

Ak Zhol Democratic Party

On 29 April 2022, at the plenary session of the Ak Zhol Democratic Party National Council, party chairman Azat Peruashev noted that President Tokayev's proposed constitutional changes incorporated Ak Zhol's political programme, especially a ban on officials holding party membership as well as the revision of legislators' privileges.

People's Party of Kazakhstan

In a written statement published on 6 May 2022, the People's Party of Kazakhstan (QHP) called for nationwide support for the constitutional reforms by voting "Yes" on amendments. It declared that the proposed initiatives and political modernisation schemes are consistent with the QHP's ideology and programme, particularly the party's aim to make Kazakh citizens the nation's "owners of land and natural resources". The party also noted that a direct vote for amendments to the Constitution would demonstrate "unity and cohesion" in the aftermath of 2022 Kazakh unrest to build a New Kazakhstan.

Auyl People's Democratic Patriotic Party

The Auyl People's Democratic Patriotic Party chairman Äli Bektaev has repeatedly expressed support for President Tokayev's "cardinal constitutional, political and economic reforms", most notably being his New Kazakhstan policy, claiming that the proposed amendment in changes towards the mixed-member majoritarian representation electoral system would "accelerate the process of democratisation". In meeting with Soviet–Afghan War veterans in Shymkent on 7 May 2022, Bektaev openly called on people to show up and vote "Yes" in the referendum as it would mark the "importance and responsibility" in the first step of a new history of Kazakhstan.

==== Public organisations and NGOs ====
Kazakhstan Institute of Social Development

Läzat Nurqatova, head of the Strategic Analysis Group of the NJSC Kazakhstan Institute of Social Development, stated that a vote for amendments would form a "new, more effective and balanced model of relations between the state and society" where Kazakh citizens would have a legal opportunity and the right to influence the policies enacted by the state.

Veterans' Organisation

On 19 May 2022, in a meeting with President Tokayev, former Mazhilis chairman and head of the Veterans Organisation NGO Baktykozha Izmukhambetov announced that a headquarters within the organisation was formed in support of the referendum which would carry out work in explaining the meaning of amendments to the constitution and ensuring active participation in the vote.

=== Criticism of the amendments and referendum ===
Although constitutional changes had been long advocated by opposition movements, most refrained from endorsing the vote. Instead, they criticised it for the way it was conducted and the timing, by not allowing for citizens to directly form proposals, lack of broad discussions regarding the changes, as well as having the proposed amendments drafted by the Kazakh government itself. According to Vlast.kz, the purpose of a referendum would not bring "a new political subjectivity" for Kazakhstan, but instead simply allow for President Tokayev to acquire legitimacy in the same way as his predecessor Nazarbayev.

Human Rights Watch (HRW) expressed concern regarding the time frame of the referendum which greatly limited public consultations and debates about the proposed amendments. HRW also believed that simply strengthening the human rights commissioner status and the establishment of a Constitutional Court were insufficient changes to ensure proper maintenance of human rights in Kazakhstan. The HRW advised the Kazakh government to postpone the vote for a broader consultation before the proposals are put before the electorate.

On 30 May 2022, Current Time TV reported that a press briefing held by several civil activists called for Kazakh citizens to boycott the referendum, citing lack of explanatory work done by the Kazakh authorities, describing Tokayev's proposed changes to the constitution as "ostentatious" and suggesting for the money allocated for the vote to be instead spent on raising pensions and solving housing issues in Kazakhstan, which they deemed "problems that are closer to the people".

==== Opposition movements and associations ====
On 18 May 2022, representatives of the Ult Tagdyry, Halyqaralyq Atajurt Jastary, and Muqalmas associations along with civil activists appealed to President Tokayev to postpone the referendum for three months, citing the need to allow for public discussions to take place, an absence of independent experts in the composition of the amendment commission, as well the dissolution of several existing composition of state bodies that would ensure political reforms are taking place.

"Oyan, Qazaqstan!"

Dimaş Äljanov, a political scientist and activist of the "Oyan, Qazaqstan!" movement, assessed President Tokayev's pledge in reducing his executive powers as an "empty promise", claiming that he would retain all the powers of former president Nazarbayev. Äljanov described the amendments to the constitution as an "whitewashed facade" with "no political significance" and warned that if Kazakhstan's political system remains closed and undemocratic then it would potentially face more upheaval until its governing system fully collapses, citing the example of former Soviet states of Moldova, Ukraine and Georgia, claiming that Kazakhstan had "passed the second round in the chain".

== Observation ==
In a meeting held on 6 May 2022, the Central Election Commission (OSK) adopted a resolution allowing foreign states and international organisations to monitor the conduct of the referendum. According to the resolution by the OSK, the observers may participate in poll watching at the invitation by the chairman of the Central Referendum Commission and Foreign Affairs Minister Mukhtar Tleuberdi, who established a headquarters for international observation. The accreditation period would last until 18:00 on 30 May 2022, five days before polls open.

On 18 May 2022, the first 39 foreign observers were accredited by the OSK from the Commonwealth of Independent States, Organization of Turkic States, CIS Interparliamentary Assembly, as well as from the countries of Azerbaijan, Belarus, Bulgaria, Georgia, and Moldova.

By the end of the accreditation work on 30 May, a total of 258 observers from international organisations and foreign states were accredited by the OSK, these included:

- CIS Observer Mission – 30
- CIS Interparliamentary Assembly – 40
- Parliamentary Assembly of the Collective Security Treaty Organization – 8
- Mission of Observers from the Shanghai Cooperation Organisation – 17
- Mission of the Parliamentary Assembly of Turkic-Speaking Countries – 20
- Organisation of Islamic Cooperation – 4
- Conference on Interaction and Confidence-Building Measures in Asia and the International Turkic Academy – 3

As well as the rest of 28 observers from the foreign states of Armenia, Japan, Kyrgyzstan, Latvia, Hungary, the Netherlands, Sweden, Tajikistan, Turkey, the United Kingdom and Uzbekistan.

=== OSCE ===
The Office for Democratic Institutions and Human Rights (ODIHR) under the Organization for Security and Co-operation in Europe (OSCE) undertook a Needs Assessment Mission (NAM) from 11 to 13 May 2022 with the mission in assessing the pre-referendum environment and preparations for the vote. During that time, meetings were held with officials from state institutions, representatives of media, civil society, and the international community. The ODIHR NAM in a report published on 19 May, noted that the referendum campaign was driven mainly by MPs and representatives of other state institutions with no other opposing groups calling for a "No" vote. Some NAM representatives expressed mistrust over whether the state institutions were conducting "a balanced campaign in a free and fair manner".

Due to the short time between announcement of the referendum and voting day, the ODIHR NAM suggested the deployment of a Referendum Assessment Mission (RAM) rather than an observation mission. On 24 May, the ODHIR opened its mission-based in Nur-Sultan, with the aim of assessing the referendum under OSCE commitments as well as other international obligations and standards.

== Opinion polls ==
From early May, polling was conducted regarding the views of Kazakh citizens on the referendum under state-owned firms of the Central Communications Service, Kazakhstan Institute for Strategic Studies, and Qoğamdyq Pikir across all regions of Kazakhstan through online surveys and phone calls. Official support for holding a nationwide vote on the constitutional amendments appeared to increase while campaigning period.

Sociological and political experts interviewed by the Radio Free Europe/Radio Liberty were sceptical of the polls' accuracy, citing lack of independent pollsters (all legally accredited polling firms are run by the Presidential Administration), the statistical numbers for the polling results exhibiting little variation, and documented past cases of independent pollsters being prosecuted by the police in previously held Kazakh elections. The opinion polls for the referendum were accused of being used as a propaganda tool by the Kazakh government in an attempt to distort President Tokayev's popularity and form a public illusion for a preliminary outcome.

=== On holding a referendum ===
An overwhelming majority of Kazakh populace supported a referendum according to official polls, with several polling organizations stating that support for holding a referendum was correlated with support of proposed packaged of amendments as well.

| Polling source | Date(s) conducted | Sample size | Yes | No | Undecided | Lead |
|---|---|---|---|---|---|---|
| Central Communications Service | 24–29 May 2022 | 1,200 | 83.9 | – | – | – |
| Referendum: Halyq üni | 27 May 2022 | 1,700 | 67.9 | – | – | – |
| Central Communications Service | 17–19 May 2022 | 4,000 | 72.0 | – | – | – |
| Kazakhstan Institute for Strategic Studies | 9–12 May 2022 | 1,200 | 76.4 | 15.4 | 8.2 | 61 |
| Central Communications Service | 4–5 May 2022 | 1,172 | 71.7 | – | – | – |
| Qoğamdyq Pikir | 3–5 May 2022 | – | 73.3 | – | – | – |

=== In support of the proposed amendments ===
| Polling source | Date(s) conducted | Sample size | Yes | No | Undecided | Lead |
|---|---|---|---|---|---|---|
| Central Communications Service | 24–29 May 2022 | 1,200 | 76.5 | – | – | – |
| Referendum: Halyq üni | 27 May 2022 | 1,700 | 75.9 | – | – | – |

=== Taking part in the referendum ===
The number of Kazakh electorate willing to show up to the polls was marked with importance as the proposed amendments need to gather the absolute majority of all votes, including blank and invalid ones, on the national level as well as in two third of the 18 regions and autonomous cities, and a minimum turnout of 50% of registered voters for them to be adopted.

| Polling source | Date(s) conducted | Sample size | Yes | No | Undecided | Lead |
|---|---|---|---|---|---|---|
| Central Communications Service | 24–29 May 2022 | 1,200 | 76.5 | – | – | – |
| Central Communications Service | 17–19 May 2022 | 4,000 | 68.9 | – | 21.8 | 47.1 |
| Kazakhstan Institute for Strategic Studies | 9–12 May 2022 | 1,200 | 66.4 | – | – | – |

=== Exit polls ===
During voting day, exit polls were conducted outside of polling stations in which voters were asked were whether they voted for or against the amendments. Pollsters were refrained from telling the results of their surveys and submitted their digital reports to the firms before the exit polls were set to be officially published. At approximately midnight of 6 June, the exit polls were announced in media outlets covering the referendum which indicated that majority of Kazakh citizens had voted for changes in the constitution.

| Polling source | Yes | No |
|---|---|---|
| Qoğamdyq Pikir | 74.8 | 25.2 |
| Democratic Institute | 79.4 | 20.6 |
| Sotis-A | 76.7 | 23.3 |

== Conduct ==
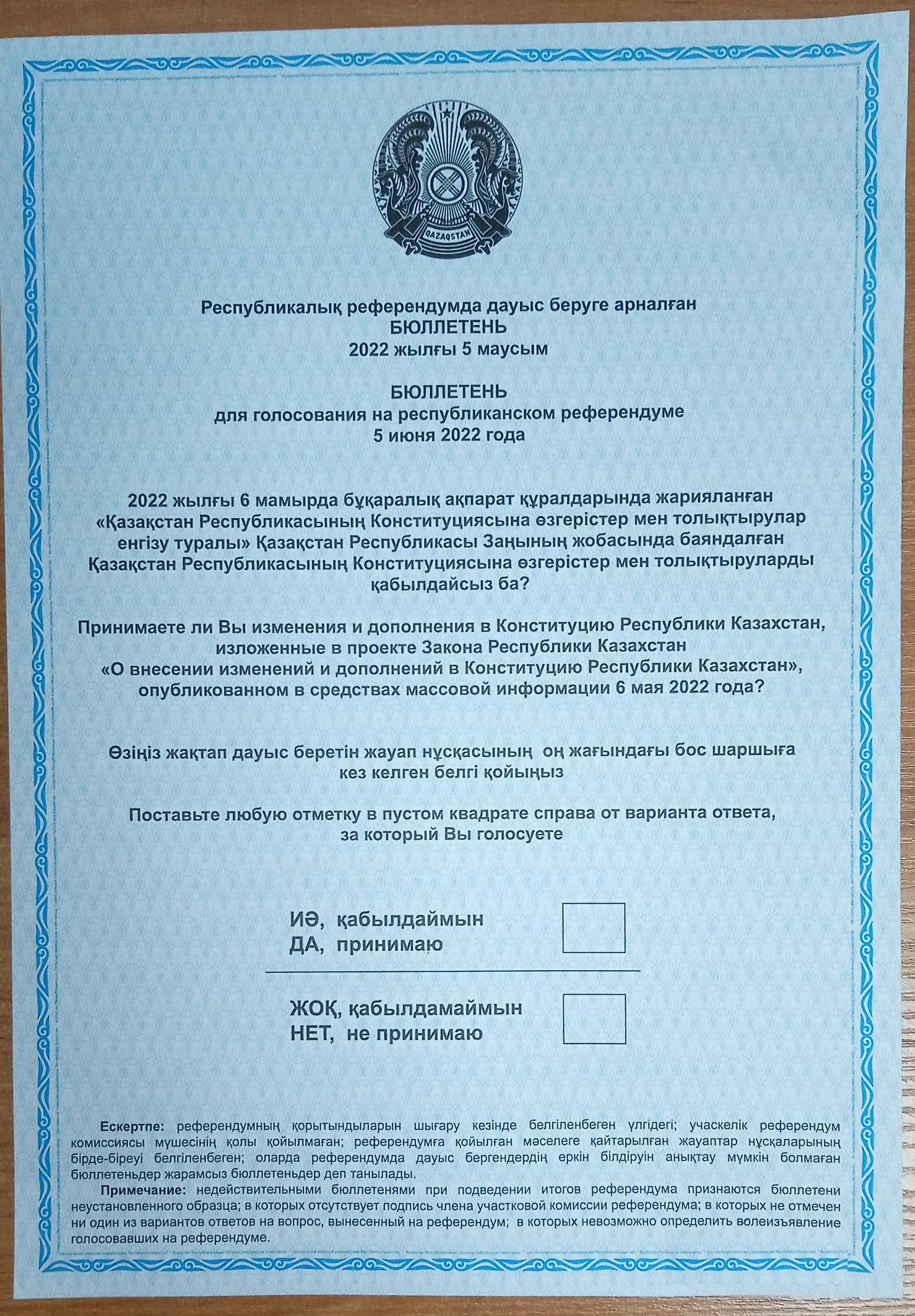
Voting ballot used in the referendum (written in both Kazakh and Russian)

On 5 June 2022 at 07:00 polling precincts were opened in Kazakhstan, beginning with the 12 regions in the eastern part of the country. By 08:00, the voting was taking place in all regions with 9,964 precincts functioning domestically and internationally.

By 14:00, the voter turnout exceeded the required 50% threshold with 6,262,973 total ballots cast, fulfilling the validity quorum.

With polls closing at 22:00, a total of 8,030,739 citizens had taken part in the vote with the total nationwide preliminary turnout rate being 68.44%.

=== COVID-19 measures ===
Since March 2022, the epidemiological situation of COVID-19 in Kazakhstan had remained stable as all regions in the country remained in the "green zone" with health restrictions that included quarantine rules, mandatory face masks and vaccine passports being lifted.

Chief Sanitary Doctor of Kazakhstan and Vice Healthcare Minister Aijan Esmağambetova participating in a briefing of the Central Election Commission (OSK) on 6 May 2022, announced that the Ministry of Healthcare would prepare a separate resolution in regard to COVID-19 requirements for the referendum which would be made on a basis of the epidemiological situation development both nationally and regionally. In case of worsening of the infections, Esmağambetova suggested the possibility of introducing COVID-19 restrictions towards poll workers such as mandatory use of the Ashyq vaccine passport or documented evidence of vaccination and potential revaccinations, barring infected persons at the polling stations, as well as observation of face masking, social distancing and disinfecting. Nevertheless, Esmağambetova predicted that the epidemiological situation would be favourable on voting day.

On 30 May 2022, a drafted resolution made under Esmağambetova was adopted at the OSK meeting which instructed regulating a group of referendum participants; maintaining social distance; preventing large crowds; ensuring uninterrupted operation of ventilation or air conditioning systems in the rooms; systematic ventilation of rooms in the absence of artificial ventilation; ventilatation and disinfection of rooms before and during voting. Esmağambetova stated the measures would help to maintain "a stable epidemiological situation in the country".

=== Voter registration ===
The lists of citizens entitled to participate in the vote for each polling station in their place of residence are submitted by the äkim (local head) to the Central Election Commission (OSK) by 15 May, and from 20 May, the inclusion in the voter list is reviewed by every citizen with the precinct referendum commission notifying the citizens of the time and place of voting before 25 May 2022.

On 21 May 2022, the Ministry of Foreign Affairs published a list of polling stations overseas in which 65 precinct commissions were formed in 52 countries. According to the Ministry, Kazakh citizens who have a right to vote, live or residing for private, official, business and tourist purposes in a foreign country and have valid citizenship passports can apply to of a citizen of the Republic of Kazakhstan, can apply to the diplomatic mission of Kazakhstan where a precinct commission was formed.

=== Absentee voting ===
At a 26 May 2022 meeting of the Central Election Commission, chairman Nurlan Äbdirov ruled that in the case of changing a place of residence, a citizen would be granted an absentee vote certificate by submitting a request to the precinct commission from 20 May to 4 June 2022 on 18:00. Receiving an absentee ballot is made under the attorney's powers without requiring a notarisation. Äbdirov noted that the absentee vote certificates are not issued to citizens willing to vote in other polling stations within the same locality.

=== Protests ===
Prior before polls were set to open, the US embassy located in Nur-Sultan on 3 June 2022 issued a security warning regarding of an anticipating protests by encouraging American citizens to carry appropriate identification in case of unreasonable suspicion or unprobeable search cause by the law enforcement and avoid observing or attending any demonstrations as they are prone to ending in mass violence and arrests, as well as warning of experiencing a potential limited or a complete internet outage.

Several protests against referendum took place on voting day, with Darhan Şäripov, an activist of the "Oyan, Qazaqstan" movement being detained by the Almaty police after holding a single picket in Arbat with signs written in both Cyrillic and Latin letters that read "Реконституция" ("Reconstitution") and "Qandy Qantar. 2022 жыл. Ұмытпаймыз" ("Bloody January. 2022. Let's not forget"). According to Şäripov, the proposed constitutional amendments are simply "semi-reforms" and not "political".

Activists of the unregistered Democratic Party of Kazakhstan Inga Imanbai and Arujan Düisebaeva held a protest rally at the polling station No. 257 in Almaty, writing on their ballot papers to release party leader Janbolat Mamai from prison as well as calls for a criminal trial towards Nazarbayev. Both Imanbai and Düisebaeva marched to the Republic Square where they demanded the Kazakh authorities to publish a list of January 2022 unrest victims and the release political prisoners. Despite earlier warnings by the akimat (local executive branch) representative and the prosecutor regarding the illegality of the action, none of the activists were detained.

Security measures were also spotted throughout the cities in Kazakhstan, specifically the location points where the opposition called for unsanctioned rallies to be held as heavy unexplained police presence including buses and paddy wagons cordoning off the public spaces.

Other forms of protest used in the voting were spoiling ballots–a move that would invalidate the votes–in which advocates of the protest action stressed that marking "No" in the ballot paper would imply legitimacy of the referendum.

=== Voter intimidation ===
At a polling station No. 2529 in Almaty, Radio Free Europe/Radio Liberty reporters revealed several voters who were employees of state institutions taking photos to provide to their employers as evidence that they showed up and voted in the referendum.

Other instance reported by the League of Young Voters of the Youth Information Service of Kazakhstan (MISK), which monitored the voting process in eight cities of Kazakhstan, documented cases of university students in fears of suspension forcefully instructed to "take a picture at the polling station and send it to the head."

=== Violations ===
During voting, several alleged cases of electoral fraud were reported. Independent observers witnessed irregularities across polling precincts such as restricted accesses including the prohibited use of taking photos and videos, unauthorised individuals at voting booths, uncertified voters being handed ballots, people casting votes more than once, as well as harassment of observers by unknown provocateurs.

At polling station No. 59 in Nur-Sultan where President Tokayev himself voted, Radio Free Europe/Radio Liberty correspondents along with Channel 7 and Ulysmedia reported that they were denied entry for press coverage as Tokayev was answering journalists' questions and were only allowed inside after Tokayev had left.

Elvira Äzimova, the Commissioner for Human Rights in Kazakhstan, at a briefing commented about rumours regarding the rules of voting in which she cited an audio message recorded by an unknown person that called on Kazakh citizens to request for 33 ballots each at the polling station and write on paper the norms that they disagree with the amendments. According to Äzimova, the intention was "a deliberate violation of civic activism and the intention to participate in the referendum", warning others that the move would invalidate peoples' votes and urging instead the public to trust state and civil society sources with the audio message perpetrator being held accountable.

==== False claims ====
A video supposedly showing a voter being given a disappearing ink pen at the polling booths to mark the ballot and then subsequently burning it with fire surfaced on social media in which Stopfake.kz, a fact checking website, dismissed it as being an old footage which first appeared in 2019 as it had notably gone viral previously in other countries.

Other reported incidents were ballot box stuffing, with one video showing a group of people putting several ballots in the ballot box at once. The footage was revealed to be fake as it was instead confirmed to have actually taken place during the 2009 Kyrgyz presidential election.

==== Almaty Polling Station No. 2 ====
In around afternoon of 5 June, a video recorded by an observer appeared on social media showing a woman who served as a member of the Referendum Commission at the polling station No. 2 in Almaty reportedly stuffing ballots into a box.

According to Janna Asanova, chairman of the Almaty Territorial Election Commission, the members of the precinct where the incident took place denied any responsibility for themselves and in response were suspended until the circumstance of the situation would be evaluated. Asanova affirmed that the ballot box was sealed and removed from the precinct and that the subsequent ballots were thrown into a new box, not ruling out in the possibility of the votes inside the tampered stationary box would be declared invalid based on the assessments made by the law enforcement agencies and the Central Election Commission.

== Results ==
On 5 June 2022 at 22:00 the Central Election Commission (OSK) secretary Muqtar Erman announced that the Referendum Commission had begun counting votes and that the ballot counts by the Territorial Election Commissions (ASKs) had been received in electronic form. Preliminary results would be presented the following day. On 6 June at 08:00 the OSK at a briefing unveiled preliminary results, officially confirming that the proposed constitutional amendments were approved by the public with the preliminary results showing a 68.1% voter turnout, with an overwhelming majority of 77.2% (6,163,863 votes) casting "Yes" in favour of the amendments to the constitution while 18.7% (1,490,475 votes) were against. According to Nurlan Äbdirov, chairman of the OSK, the number of ballots in which both "Yes" and "No" were marked at once amounted to 1.58% (25,859 votes) were deemed as validly cast, but not included in the tabulated scores for "Yes" and "No", while the 2.58% (206,096 votes) were declared as invalid. Äbdirov noted that the ASKs must provide to the OSK the original protocols from each region within two days to summarise the final results that would be presented at a following briefing.

At an OSK meeting held on 7 June 2022, the final results were published which showed the "Yes" choice winning majority of votes in all Kazakhstan's regions and that the amendments and changes to the constitution adopted in the referendum would come into force immediately upon the OSK announcement. The OSK also ruled that the results from the polling station No. 2 in Almaty where the administrative unit's 524 votes were excluded from the overall final vote count.

| Choice | Votes | % |
|---|---|---|
| For | 6,163,516 | 80.53 |
| Against | 1,490,470 | 19.47 |
| Total | 7,653,986 | 100.00 |
| Valid votes | 7,653,986 | 97.38 |
| Invalid/blank votes | 205,924 | 2.62 |
| Total votes | 7,859,910 | 100.00 |
| Registered voters/turnout | 11,734,642 | 66.98 |
Source: Central Election Commission

=== By region ===
Percentage of "Yes" votes by region: +80% 75–80% 70–75% -70%

Percentage of "No" votes by region: +25% 20–25% 15–20% -15%

Total results by region
| Region | Registered voters | Yes | | No | | Invalid or blank | | Other | | Total |
| Region | Registered voters | Votes | % | Votes | % | Votes | % | Votes | % | Total |
|---|---|---|---|---|---|---|---|---|---|---|
| Akmola Region | 507,706 | 305,824 | 81.98% | 54,225 | 14.54% | 8,457 | 2.27% | 4,521 | 0.21% | 373,027 |
| Aktobe Region | 559,508 | 230,539 | 71.47% | 79,699 | 24.71% | 8,379 | 2.59% | 3,932 | 1.22% | 322,549 |
| Almaty Region | 1,393,831 | 797,254 | 79.01% | 176,802 | 17.52% | 18,694 | 1.85% | 16,304 | 1.62% | 1,009,054 |
| Atyrau Region | 397,292 | 195,766 | 73.14% | 62,352 | 23.29% | 6,735 | 2.52% | 2,814 | 1.05% | 267,667 |
| West Kazakhstan Region | 444,163 | 223,908 | 73.27% | 73,825 | 24.16% | 4,254 | 1.39% | 3,589 | 1.17% | 305,576 |
| Jambyl Region | 688,369 | 375,277 | 78.62% | 85,173 | 17.85% | 8,986 | 1.88% | 7,854 | 1.64% | 477,290 |
| Karaganda Region | 881,179 | 526,079 | 77.78% | 112,811 | 16.67% | 21,947 | 3.24% | 15,568 | 2.30% | 676,405 |
| Kostanay Region | 553,615 | 301,995 | 75.87% | 83,072 | 20.87% | 8,974 | 2.25% | 3,986 | 1.00% | 398,027 |
| Kyzylorda Region | 463,043 | 289,152 | 78.50% | 67,121 | 18.22% | 7,186 | 1.95% | 4,896 | 1.32% | 368,355 |
| Mangystau Region | 406,069 | 174,503 | 71.00% | 64,852 | 26.39% | 4,268 | 1.74% | 2,153 | 0.88% | 245,776 |
| Pavlodar Region | 513,092 | 303,210 | 78.73% | 69,408 | 18.02% | 8,547 | 2.22% | 3,968 | 1.03% | 385,133 |
| North Kazakhstan Region | 379,826 | 232,995 | 81.58% | 43,656 | 15.29% | 5,687 | 1.99% | 3,265 | 1.14% | 285,603 |
| Turkistan Region | 1,164,478 | 739,269 | 79.05% | 162,536 | 17.38% | 23,380 | 2.50% | 10,007 | 1.07% | 935,192 |
| East Kazakhstan Region | 912,223 | 542,940 | 77.21% | 119,851 | 17.04% | 23,789 | 3.38% | 16,658 | 2.37% | 703,238 |
| Nur-Sultan | 708,969 | 323,124 | 79.59% | 60,286 | 14.85% | 14,997 | 3.69% | 7,587 | 1.87% | 405,994 |
| Almaty | 1,129,117 | 242,977 | 65.22% | 102,245 | 27.45% | 16,986 | 4.56% | 10,325 | 2.77% | 372,533 |
| Shymkent | 632,072 | 358,704 | 78.95% | 72,556 | 15.97% | 14,658 | 3.23% | 8,432 | 1.86% | 454,350 |
| Overseas diaspora | 90 | — | — | — | — | — | — | — | — | — |
| Kazakhstan | 11,734,642 | 6,163,516 | 77.18% | 1,490,470 | 18.66% | 205,924 | 2.58% | 125,859 | 1.58% | 7,985,769 |

=== Voter turnout ===
Voter turnout rate by region (as of 5 June 22:00): +80% 75–80% 70–75% 65–70% 60–65% 55–60% -55%

| Region | Time | | | | | | |
| Region | 10:00 | 12:00 | 14:00 | 16:00 | 18:00 | 20:00 | 22:00 |
|---|---|---|---|---|---|---|---|
| Akmola Region | 26.63% | 41.31% | 56.89% | 65.11% | 69.07% | 73.81% | 73.81% |
| Aktobe Region | 25.62% | 41.14% | 45.64% | 53.52% | 55.90% | 55.90% | 58.06% |
| Almaty Region | 28.53% | 43.05% | 58.07% | 66.58% | 68.10% | 72.83% | 72.83% |
| Atyrau Region | 29.87% | 37.33% | 50.68% | 56.19% | 62.45% | 62.45% | 67.68% |
| West Kazakhstan Region | 32.20% | 47.58% | 53.58% | 57.70% | 65.49% | 65.49% | 69.37% |
| Jambyl Region | 32.16% | 55.15% | 63.46% | 67.36% | 68.10% | 69.59% | 69.59% |
| Karaganda Region | 33.56% | 51.60% | 61.08% | 68.69% | 73.31% | 77.39% | 77.39% |
| Kostanay Region | 30.14% | 49.96% | 62.47% | 69.18% | 71.07% | 72.28% | 72.28% |
| Kyzylorda Region | 28.87% | 48.73% | 65.30% | 72.26% | 75.02% | 75.02% | 79.89% |
| Mangystau Region | 23.67% | 36.02% | 43.36% | 53.13% | 59.14% | 59.14% | 61.19% |
| Pavlodar Region | 33.14% | 51.17% | 57.79% | 64.58% | 72.88% | 72.88% | 75.53% |
| North Kazakhstan Region | 34.17% | 58.25% | 62.41% | 69.80% | 73.12% | 75.49% | 75.49% |
| Turkistan Region | 33.15% | 46.69% | 53.63% | 72.00% | 78.24% | 80.66% | 80.66% |
| East Kazakhstan Region | 29.88% | 48.86% | 64.21% | 68.30% | 72.76% | 77.49% | 77.49% |
| Nur-Sultan | 24.18% | 37.03% | 41.13% | 48.40% | 53.87% | 57.06% | 57.06% |
| Almaty | 13.91% | 20.14% | 23.60% | 25.95% | 29.82% | 32.25% | 33.30% |
| Shymkent | 34.19% | 44.61% | 59.32% | 63.34% | 69.55% | 72.53% | 72.53% |
| Kazakhstan | 28.59% | 43.70% | 53.43% | 60.80% | 65.04% | 67.65% | 68.44% |

== Aftermath ==
In the afternoon of 6 June 2022, President Tokayev addressed the nation following the referendum in which he proclaimed that Kazakhstan had entered "a new stage of development", claiming that the vote was held "at a high level" and "in full accordance with the democratic requirements" by dismissing any claims of coercion. Tokayev thanked the Kazakh public for participation and supporting the referendum as well as others and public organisations in explaining the proposed amendments to the 1995 Constitution of Kazakhstan, adding that the changes are not the final stage–but the beginning of new reforms in which he pledged to continue "comprehensive modernisation" by outlining future policies that would be pursued.

=== Reactions ===
The referendum received mixed reactions among various political scientists, analysts, critics, activists, journalists, and Kazakh citizens themselves with the general consensus being that the vote on constitutional changes was an attempt for Tokayev to consolidate his own political power. It was also viewed as a blow to former president Nursultan Nazarbayev's legacy as his grip of maintaining influence and power over the state came to an end with the removal of a constitutional title in being the "Elbasy" ("leader of the nation"), a move that could open doors for a potential criminal prosecution against him.

According to political scientist Dosym Satpaev, the referendum served as a "mini-rehearsal of the upcoming presidential elections" set to take place in 2024 for the Kazakh government to actively promote New Kazakhstan policy made by Tokayev. In Satpaev's opinion, the amendments would not eliminate current imbalance between the branches of government as Tokayev sought to increase his legitimacy specifically after the January 2022 unrest.

Luca Anceschi, professor of Eurasian Studies at the University of Glasgow, pointed out that the previous 1995 constitutional referendum was "a power consolidation tool" under President Nazarbayev and that the case would remain under Tokayev's Kazakhstan as well.

In a written article to The Loop under European Consortium for Political Research, Bakhytzhan Kurmanov, an assistant professor at the International School of Economics in KazGUU University, feared that Tokayev's reforms would prefigure Kazakhstan's democratisation and lead to an emergence of an IT-backed authoritarianism in the country, citing the use of massive digital campaign by the Kazakh government during the referendum.

In Kamran Bokhari's editorial to The Wall Street Journal, he described the referendum as a "step toward democracy" for Kazakhstan, suggesting for the United States and Europe as well to welcome and encourage the trajectory as Kazakhstan's "prospective transformation is in keeping with Western values" that is in line "with American strategic interests in dealing with Russia and China". Bokhari assessed that a Western support would enhance Kazakhstan's stability and further promote American interests in Central Asia.

==== International ====
===== Organisations =====
- United Nations – In a meeting with President Tokayev on 9 June, UN Deputy Secretary-General Amina Mohamed welcomed Tokayev's large-scale reforms and congratulated him in holding of the referendum.

===== Foreign states =====
- China – Foreign Minister and State Councilor Wang Yi on the behalf of greetings and congratulations of President Xi Jinping in a meeting with Tokayev on 7 June said that the results of the referendum indicate the "broadest support of citizens" as an "extremely important" for the "construction of New Kazakhstan" creates "a solid foundation for the future development of the country".
- Kyrgyzstan – In a telephone conversation, Kyrgyz President Sadyr Japarov congratulated Tokayev in the aftermath of a national referendum by expressing a gratitude to Kazakhstan for entering a new stage of development.
- Saudi Arabia – During the Akorda meeting on 6 June, Saudi Foreign Minister Faisal bin Farhan Al Saud congratulated Tokayev in the holding of the referendum, wishing him in building the Second Republic and continuing the implementation of "largescale reforms aimed at prosperous future of Kazakhstan".
- United Kingdom – Deirdre Brown, deputy head of the UK Delegation to the Organization for Security and Co-operation in Europe, welcomed Tokayev's decision inviting international observers to the referendum, adding that the final results indicate "significant public support" as well as strengthening human rights protections within changes such as abolition of the death penalty; giving the Office of the Human Rights Commissioner a constitutional status; and re-establishing the Constitutional Court.
- United States – U.S. Under Secretary for Civilian Security, Democracy, and Human Rights Uzra Zeya in a message to Special Representative of the President for International Cooperation Erzhan Kazykhanov outlined, "the United States strongly supports President Tokayev's political modernization and human rights reform agendas, and in this regard, we welcome June 5 referendum as the next step in this reform process."
- Uzbekistan – President Shavkat Mirziyoyev in a phone call with Tokayev praised in successfully holding a referendum as "an important political event".

== See also ==
- Politics of Kazakhstan
- Constitution Day (Kazakhstan)
- 2026 Kazakh constitutional referendum
