= Elvira Äzimova =

Kazakh legal scholar and jurist (1973)

Elvira Äzımova
- Эльвира Әзімова
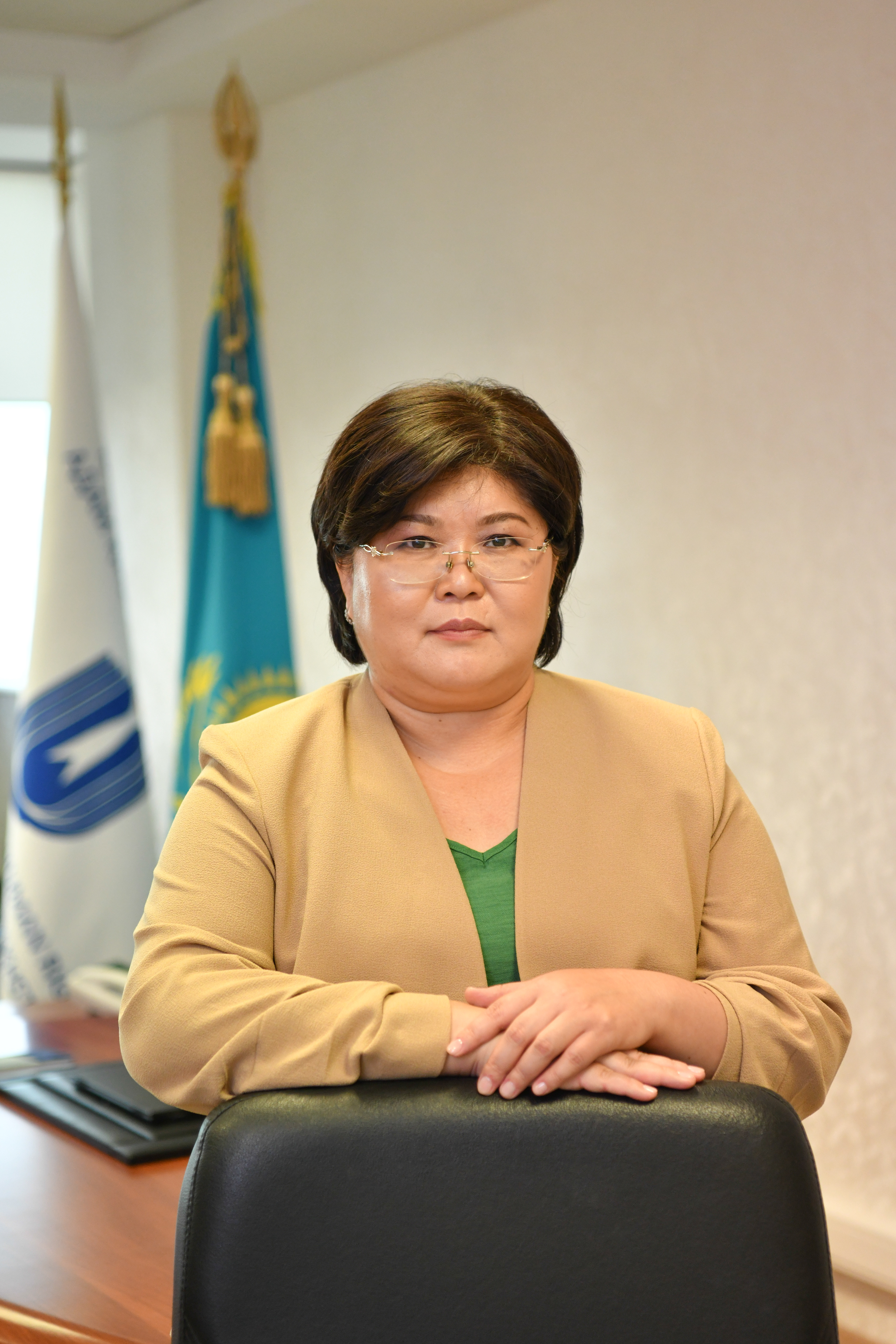
- Äzimova in 2022

Chairwoman of the Constitutional Court of Kazakhstan
- Incumbent
- Assumed office 1 January 2023
- Nominated by: Kassym-Jomart Tokayev
- Preceded by: Murat Baimaqanov (1995)

Judge of the Constitutional Court of Kazakhstan
- Incumbent
- Assumed office 1 January 2023
- Nominated by: Kassym-Jomart Tokayev

Personal details
- Born: Elvira Abilkasymovna Azimova; 15 February 1973 (age 53) Dzhambul, Dzhambul Oblast, Kazakh SSR, Kazakhstan
- Education: Ahmet Yassawi University
- Occupation: Judge
- Awards: Order of the Leopard; Order of Friendship; Order of Kurmet

Elvira Äbılqasymqyzy Äzımova (Kazakh: Эльвира Әбілқасымқызы Әзімова; born 15 February 1973) is a Kazakh legal scholar and jurist who is serving as the chairwoman of the Constitutional Court of Kazakhstan since 1 January 2023.

== Early life and education ==
Äzımova was born in the city of Dzhambul (now Taraz) in the Kazakh Soviet Socialist Republic. She graduated from the Qoja Ahmet Yassawi International Kazakh-Turkish University in 1996 with a degree in law.

== Career ==
From the mid-1990s onward, Äzımova held a series of senior positions in the Ministry of Justice of Kazakhstan. Her early career included work as a leading and chief consultant in the Ministry's Department of International Legal Support (1996–1999).

Between 1999 and 2010, she headed various departments within the Ministry of Justice, including divisions on legislation, international law, protocol, protection of state property rights, and treaty and claims work.

From 2010 to 2013 she served as Director of the department for the Expertise of International Treaties.

On 2 October 2013 she was appointed Vice Minister of Justice of Kazakhstan by order of President Nursultan Nazarbayev.

=== Commissioner for Human Rights ===
On 2 September 2019, Äzımova was nominated by President Kassym-Jomart Tokayev to the post of the Commissioner for Human Rights in the Republic of Kazakhstan (Ombudsman), of which her candidacy was unanimously supported by deputies of the Senate of Kazakhstan. Äzımova's appointment as Ombudsman, noted by columnist Karim Mukzhidek of The Village Kazakhstan, was met with cautious optimism: she was regarded as a capable technocrat with strong legal expertise, though expectations for major changes within the traditionally limited Ombudsman institution remained modest.

During her tenure as Ombudsman, Äzımova also became a member of the Presidential Commission on Human Rights from 18 September 2021.

In an interview to Aiqyn publication, Äzımova emphasized the Ombudsman's role as an independent protector of human rights, noting that 2022 constitutional amendments strengthened institutional guarantees while outlining ongoing challenges in ensuring effective rights protection, particularly in regions; she highlighted practical cases her office resolved and stressed the need for stronger cooperation between state bodies, civil society, and legal institutions.

Äzımova criticized the November 2022 swift closure of 80 percent torture complaints in relation to the aftermath of the 2022 Kazakh unrest, arguing that investigations were incomplete and that responsibility should extend beyond individual officers to senior officials overseeing detention facilities.

=== Constitutional Court of Kazakhstan ===
On 29 December 2022, President Kassym-Jomart Tokayev appointed Äzımova as chairwoman of the Constitutional Court of the Republic of Kazakhstan, with the Court officially commencing its work on 1 January 2023.

In its first year, under Äzımova's leadership, the Constitutional Court received over 5,300 appeals, of which 93% were returned for formal reasons. The Court focused on verifying the constitutionality of laws, ensuring compliance with citizens’ rights, and monitoring the implementation of its decisions. It introduced measures to improve accessibility, including plans to provide the Constitution in Braille and expand legal support for vulnerable groups, while maintaining independence from political influence and incorporating international best practices.

As chairman, Äzımova regularly commented on sensitive legal and social issues brought before the Constitutional Court. In a 2024 interview with Kazinform, she highlighted the increasing use of direct constitutional complaints, the high number of appeals outside the Court's competence, and the need for timely implementation of constitutional rulings. She also addressed debated topics such as the legal framework for a nuclear power plant, adoption of children by single men, school restrictions on religious attire, and public proposals to ban "LGBT propaganda", noting that these matters would fall under the Court's jurisdiction only if a relevant normative act were formally challenged.

== Honours ==
- Order of the Leopard, 3rd Class (28 August 2025)
- Order of Friendship, 2nd Class (2021)
- Order of Kurmet (2013)
- Medal "20 Years of the Constitution of the Republic of Kazakhstan" (2015)
- Medal "20 Years of Independence of the Republic of Kazakhstan" (2012)
- Medal "For Contribution to the Creation of the Eurasian Economic Union", 1st Class (2015)
- Medal "For Contribution to the Creation of the Eurasian Economic Union", (2019)
- Certificate of Honour of the Republic of Kazakhstan (2007)
