= Constitutional Council (Kazakhstan) =

- Конституциялық Кеңес
- Established: 29 December 1995
- Dissolved: 1 January 2023
- Location: Astana
- Composition method: 2 judges and the Chairman are appointed by the President, 2 judges by the Senate, 2 judges by the Mäjilis and ex-president.

The Constitutional Council (Kazakh: Конституциялық Кеңес, romanized: Konstitutsiialyq Keñes) was a collective body of constitutional jurisdiction in Kazakhstan until June 2022. It was succeeded in January 2023 by the Constitutional Court.

== Structure ==
The Constitutional Council consisted of seven members. The Chair and two members of the council were appointed by the President and two members each by the Senate and the Mäjilis. Members serve for terms of six years. In addition to the appointed members, any former Presidents of Kazakhstan are lifetime members of the Constitutional Council.

The Council was established by the 1995 Constitution which replaced the Constitutional Court. The decision of the Constitutional Council in whole or in part may be objected to by the President, which can be overturned by two-thirds of the votes of the total number of members of the Constitutional Council. According to the amendments made to the 2017 Constitution, the right of the president's objection is canceled.

Only the President, Chairman of the Senate, Chairman of the Mäjilis, at least one fifth of the total number of deputies of the Parliament, the Prime Minister were allowed to appeal to the Council, as well as the lower courts in a case of infringement of human rights and freedoms and citizen normative legal acts.

== Jurisdiction ==
The Constitutional Council considered all decisions made and laws passed by the Mäjilis, as well as international treaties to ensure they are compliant with the constitution. Rulings on new laws are made prior to them being signed by the president.

The court also ruled on election disputes.

== Powers ==
The former powers of the Council included:

- verify the correctness of the elections of the President of the Republic, deputies of parliament and the conducting of republican referendum
- verify the compliance of the Constitution of laws adopted by the Parliament prior to their signing by the President
- verify the compliance of the Constitution of decisions taken by the Parliament and its chambers
- verify the compliance of the Constitution of International Contracts before their ratification
- give the official interpretation of the norms of the Constitution
- give conclusions when adopting amendments to the Constitution.
