= Ahmet Yassawi University =

Kazakh-Turkish university located in Turkistan, Kazakhstan

Coordinates: 43°17′21″N 68°18′04″E

Akhmet Yassawi International Kazakh-Turkish University
- Қожа Ахмет Ясауи атындағы Халықаралық қазақ-түрік университеті
- Established: 1991
- Rector: Zhanar Temirbekova
- Students: 10,000
- Location: Turkistan, Kazakhstan
- Website: ayu.edu.kz

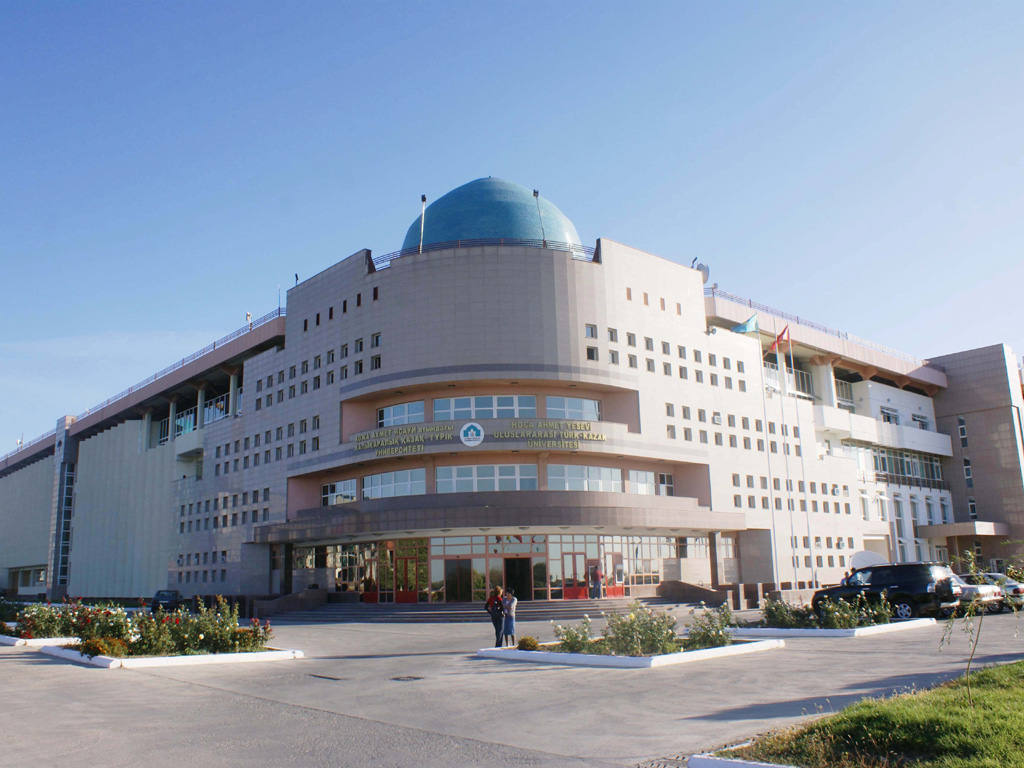
Ahmet Yassawi University Faculty of Medicine

The Qoja Ahmet Yassawi International Kazakh-Turkish University, or simply Ahmet Yassawi University (Kazakh: Ахмет Ясауи университеті, Ahmet İasaui universitetı; Turkish: Ahmet Yesevi Üniversitesi) is a university in the city of Turkistan in Kazakhstan, named for the twelfth-century Sufi poet Khoja Akhmet Yassawi. Akhmet Yassawi International Kazakh-Turkish University (Akhmet Yassawi University) established in 1991 on the personal initiative of the President Nursultan Nazarbayev and based on the Intergovernmental Agreement between Kazakhstan and Turkey to train modern highly qualified specialists from young Turkic-speaking countries, the spiritual center of the Turkic world – Turkestan and is the first university that received the status of an international institution of higher education.

== History ==
On 31 October 1992, the governments of the Republic of Kazakhstan and the Republic of Turkey signed the Agreement on the Reorganization of the University into Khoja Akhmet Yassawi International Kazakh-Turkish University.

The university’s multi-level education system includes: higher basic education (undergraduate), internship, magistracy, residency and doctoral studies. Admission to the university is carried out on state and Turkish educational grants and on a contractual basis.

The University is a member of the Caucasus University Association.

== Ranking ==
University rankings

Regional – Overall
- QS Emerging Europe and Central Asia: 130 (2022)

== Notable alumni ==
- Hussam Abu Safiya, Palestinian physician

== See also ==
- List of universities in Kazakhstan

http://ayu.edu.kz/en/about/history
