= 2022 Kazakh unrest =

Protests and unrest in Kazakhstan against the government

- Part of Kazakh opposition
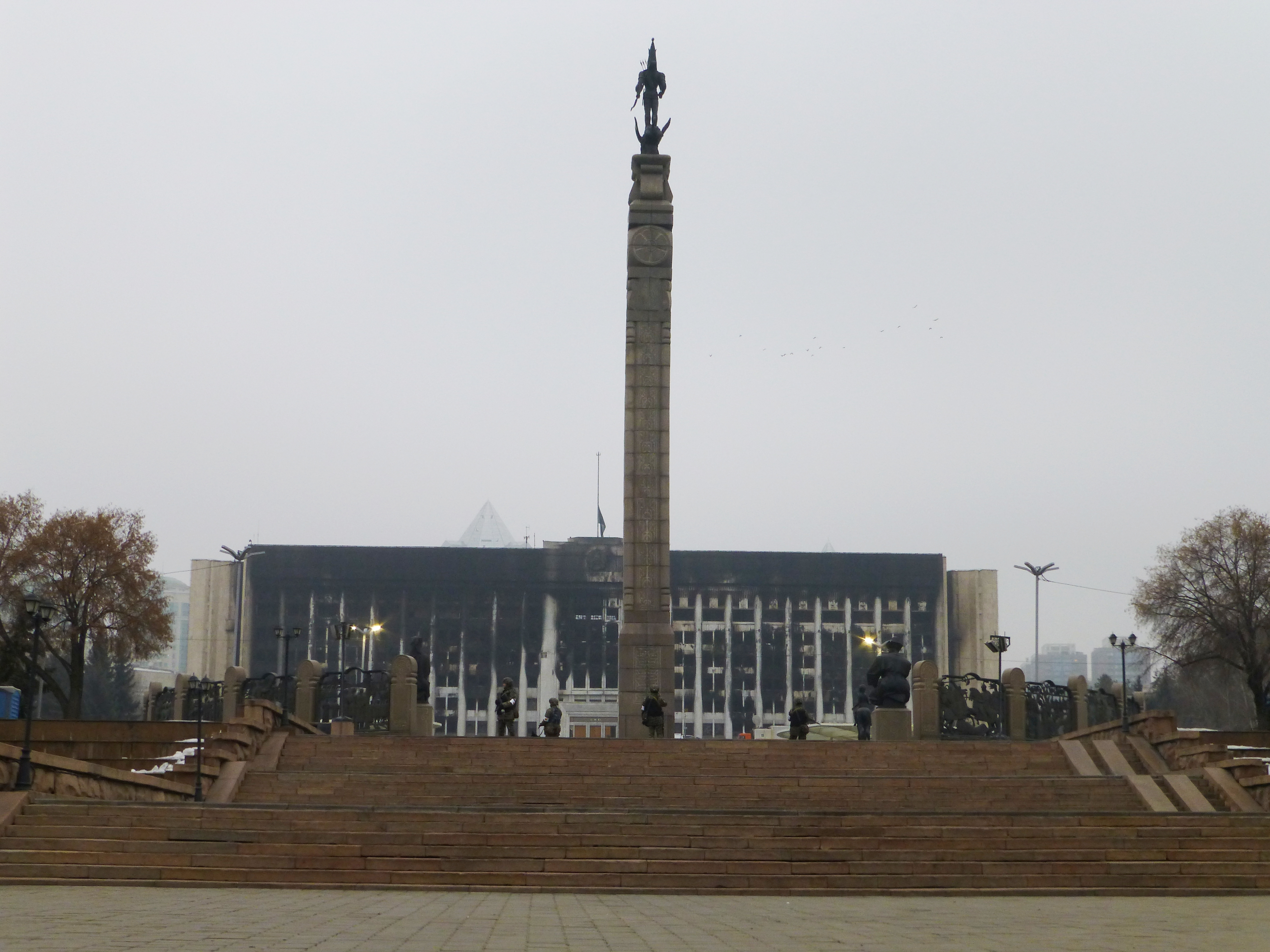
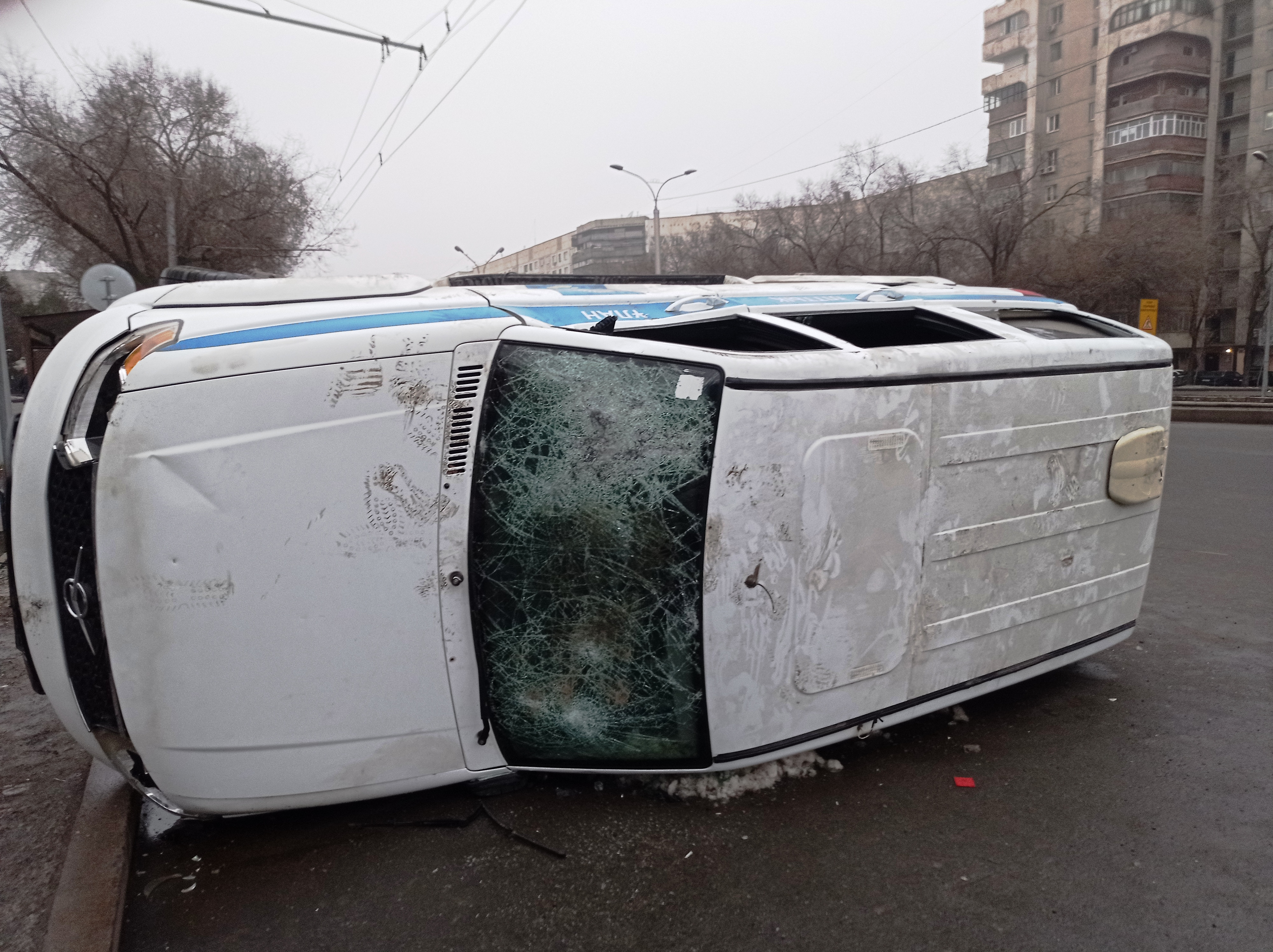
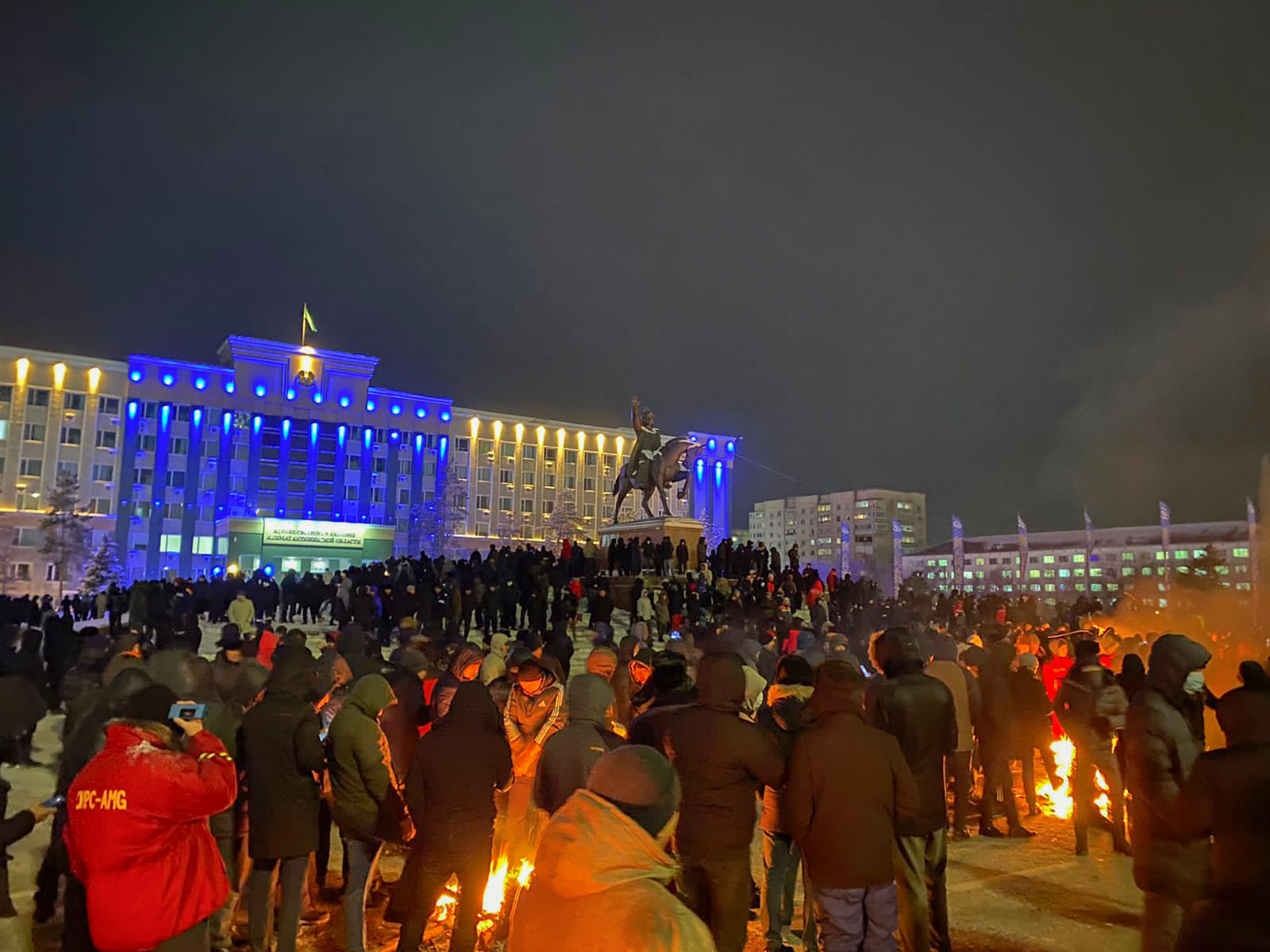
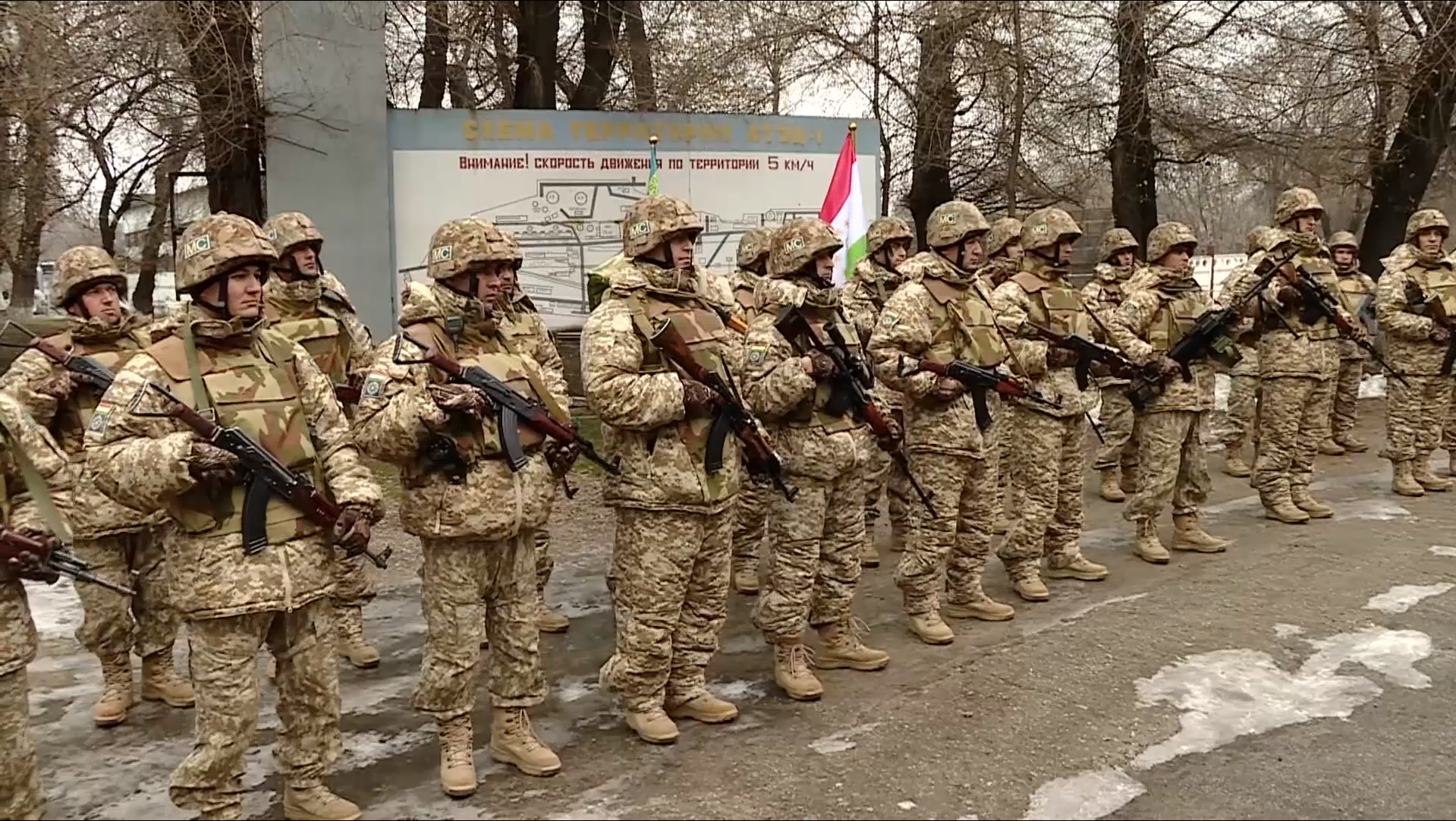
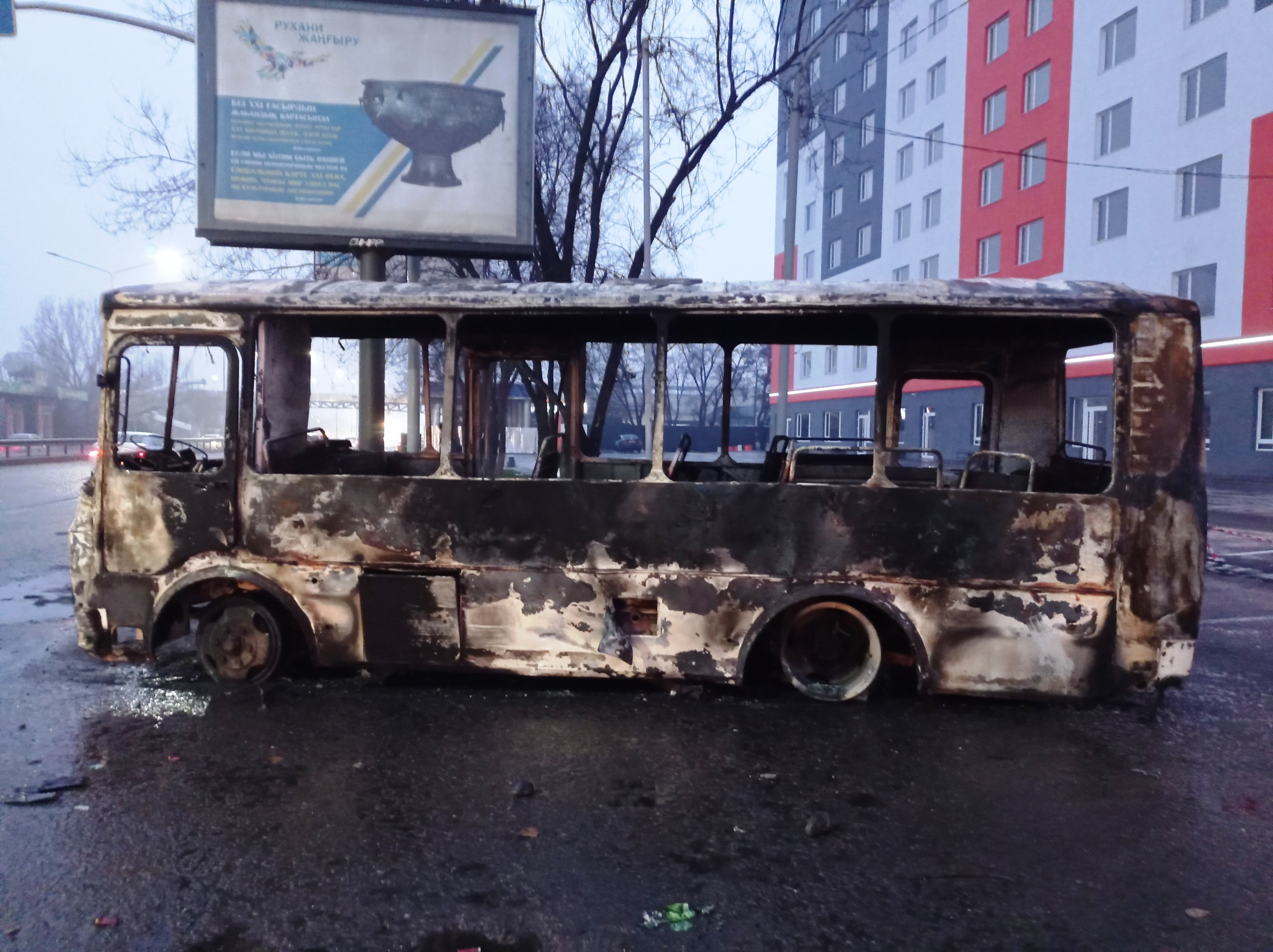
- Clockwise from top: Burned out Akimat in Republic Square • Protest in Aktobe on 4 January 2022 • Burned police paddy wagon in Almaty • Tajik Armed Forces of the CSTO peacekeeping forces in Almaty Power Station-1 • Overturned police vehicle in Almaty
- Date: 2–11 January 2022 (1 week and 2 days)
- Location: Kazakhstan
- Caused by: Increased gas prices; Economic inequality; Corruption; Dissatisfaction with the Kazakh government; Dissatisfaction with former president Nursultan Nazarbayev; COVID-19 pandemic
- Goals: Decreased fuel prices; Resignation of President Kassym-Jomart Tokayev and his administration; Removal of immunity and resignation of former president Nursultan Nazarbayev from the Security Council; Direct elections for akims (local heads); Return to the 1993 Constitution of Kazakhstan
- Methods: Demonstrations; Online activism; Riots; Strikes; Civil disobedience
- Result: Mass looting and chaos in Almaty from 5 January to 8 January including large-scale damage to various structures; Nationwide state of emergency from 5 January to 20 January; CSTO forces in Kazakhstan from 6 January to 20 January; Removal of Nazarbayev as chairman of Security Council; Resignation of Prime Minister Askar Mamin and his government; Removal of Murat Bektanov as Minister of Defence; Restoration of vehicle fuel price caps of 50 tenge per litre for six months

Parties
Kazakh opposition Protestors	Government of Kazakhstan; CSTO (Note: The Kazakh government claimed that the CSTO's operations were solely for peacekeeping purposes.)

Lead figures
No centralized leadership	Kassym-Jomart Tokayev; Askar Mamin; Älihan Smaiylov; Eraly Togjanov; Nursultan Nazarbayev; (Russia) Vladimir Putin; (Armenia) Nikol Pashinyan; (Belarus) Aleksandr Lukashenko; (Belarus) Stanislav Zas; (Russia) Andrey Serdyukov

Units involved
	Kazakhstan; Armed Forces; National Guard; Military Police; Police; Russia; 98th Guards Airborne; 45th Guards Spetsnaz; 31st Guards Air Assault Brigade; Belarus; 103rd Guards Airborne Brigade; Tajikistan; Mobile Forces; Kyrgyzstan; Scorpion Spetsnaz; Armenia; Blue Berets

Number
Over 2,000; According to government: 20,000 (Almaty)	3,800

Casualties and losses
238 killed 9,900+ arrested	19 killed No casualties reported

The 2022 Kazakh unrest, (Note: Kazakh: 2022 жылғы Қазақстандағы наразылық шаралары, romanized: 2022 jylğy Qazaqstandağy narazylyq şaralary; Russian: Протесты в Казахстане в 2022 году, romanized: Protesty v Kazahstane v 2022 godu) also known as January Events, (Note: Kazakh: Қаңтар оқиғасы, romanized: Qañtar oqiğasy IPA: [qɑŋˈtɑr woqɯjʁɑˈsə]; Russian: Январские события, romanized: Janvarskije sobytija, IPA: [jɪɱˈvarʲsʲkʲɪjɪ sɐˈbɨtʲɪjə]) Bloody January, (Note: Kazakh: Қанды қаңтар, romanized: Qandy qañtar, IPA: [qɑnˈdə qɑŋˈtɑr]; Russian: Кровавый январь, romanized: Krovavyj janvarj, IPA: [krɐˈvavɨj jɪɱˈvarʲ]) or the January Tragedy, (Note: Kazakh: Қаңтар трагедиясы, romanized: Qañtar tragediasy, IPA: [qɑŋˈtɑr trɐˌɡʲedʲɪjəˈsə]; Russian: Январская трагедия, romanized: Janvarskaja tragedija, IPA: [jɪɱˈvarskəjə trɐˈɡʲedʲɪjə]) was a series of mass protests and civil unrest that began in Kazakhstan on 2 January 2022 after a sudden sharp increase in liquefied petroleum gas prices following the lifting of a government-enforced price cap on 1 January. The protests began peacefully in the oil-producing city of Zhanaozen and quickly spread to other cities in the country, especially the nation's largest city, Almaty, which saw its demonstrations turn into violent riots, fueled by rising dissatisfaction with the government and widespread poverty. During the week-long violent unrest and crackdowns, 227 people were killed and over 9,900 were arrested, according to Kazakh officials.

Growing discontent with the government and former president Nursultan Nazarbayev, who remained the chairman of the Security Council of Kazakhstan, also influenced larger demonstrations. According to the government's version of events, organised criminal groups hijacked peaceful protests as an attempt at a coup d’état. Kazakhstan's Prosecutor General Berik Asylov stated in January 2023 that suspected organisers of the disturbances included high-ranking officials and members of organised crime groups. As there were no unified opposition groups against the Kazakh government, the unrest appeared to be assembled directly by citizens. In response, President Kassym-Jomart Tokayev declared a state of emergency in Mangystau Region and Almaty, effective from 5 January 2022. The Prime Minister Asqar Mamin resigned the same day, and Nazarbayev himself was also removed from his position of chairman of the Security Council. The state of emergency was shortly extended to the whole country. In response to Tokayev's request, the Collective Security Treaty Organization (CSTO) – a military alliance of Russia, Armenia, Belarus, Kyrgyzstan, Tajikistan and Kazakhstan – agreed to deploy troops in Kazakhstan. The aim was declared to be peacekeeping while some commentators described it as helping the Kazakh government in quelling the unrest. Russian President Vladimir Putin described the intervention as a concerted effort to protect regional allies from what he described as colour revolutions "instigated by foreign interference in allies' internal affairs". CSTO troops were initially deployed to government buildings in the capital city, Astana, and then guarded key infrastructure in Almaty. The CSTO said they did not fire a single shot while in Kazakh territory and were removed upon the first request of the Kazakh government.

As a concession, Tokayev announced that vehicle gas price caps of 50 tenge per litre would be restored for six months. On 7 January, he said in a statement that constitutional order had "largely been restored in all regions of the country." He also announced that he had ordered troops to use lethal force against armed groups, authorizing instructions to "shoot to kill" without warning, calling the protesters "bandits and terrorists" and saying that the use of force would continue to "destroy the protests." Commenting on the use of lethal force against protesters, Kazakh Prosecutor General Berik Asylov said that the fire was opened before the president's statement. "In fact, law enforcement officers do not need a special command to shoot at criminals. There are explicit norms in the laws on law enforcement, the National Guard, and counter-terrorism, which allow the fire to repel an attack when there is a threat to life and health. This is exactly the situation that occurred on Jan. 5," Asylov said.

On 10 January 2022, the government declared a national day of mourning for those who died during the unrest. On 11 January, Tokayev said that order had been restored in Kazakhstan in what he described as an attempted coup d'état. He also announced that CSTO troops would begin withdrawing from the country on 13 January, and they were fully withdrawn by 20 January. In an 11 January speech to the Parliament, Tokayev promised reform and acknowledged public discontent over income inequality and criticized Nazarbayev and his associates over their wealth. The same day, international flights were resumed to and from the country's capital, Astana. He also nominated a new prime minister that day, Älihan Smaiylov, and later fired the defence minister Murat Bektanov on 18 January. On 16 March 2022, Tokayev delivered a State of the Nation Address to both chambers of Parliament in which he outlined a New Kazakhstan program of economic and political reforms.

On 5 June, Kazakh citizens voted in a national referendum on a package of reforms intended to transform the country from a super-presidential system to a "presidential system with a strong parliament". The Central Election Commission said that 77.18% of Sunday's votes were in favour of the amendments, which decentralise decision-making in the oil-rich country and strip former strongman Nursultan Nazarbayev of his "national leader" status. Turnout was 68.06%.

== Background ==
Following the dissolution of the Soviet Union, wealthy individuals who had links to the former government of the Soviet Union received preferential treatment, gaining wealth from privatization and their land ownership of areas with valuable resources. Nursultan Nazarbayev became Kazakhstan's first president after the dissolution, ruling the country from 1990 to 2019. During this time, international observers did not recognize any of the elections in Kazakhstan as being free or fair, with Nazarbayev ruling the nation through authoritarianism, nepotism and detaining opponents, according to The Daily Telegraph and many other sources.

Through this period, Kazakhstan experienced one of the strongest performing economies in Central Asia, with oil production representing a large percentage of its economic growth until oil prices decreased in the mid-2010s. The country also held about 40% of the world's uranium resources within its territory. Despite such growth, none of the economic benefits were shared throughout the population, with the minimum wage in Kazakhstan for the common individual being less than US$100 per month and economic inequality being pervasive. In 2012, the World Economic Forum listed corruption as the biggest problem in doing business in the country, while in 2005 the World Bank listed Kazakhstan as a corruption hotspot, on par with Angola, Bolivia, Kenya, and Libya at that time. In 2013, Aftenposten quoted the human-rights activist and lawyer Denis Jivaga as saying that there is an "oil fund in Kazakhstan, but nobody knows how the income is spent". Following various international banking scandals, wealthy Kazakhs emigrated to foreign countries, especially the United Kingdom. In 2018, Crédit Suisse ranked Kazakhstan 169th out of 174 countries in wealth distribution. By 2022, approximately 162 wealthy Kazakhs held 55% of the nation's wealth.

=== Zhanaozen strike ===
Zhanaozen, an oil-producing city in Mangystau Region, has had a history of labour strikes and demonstrations. In 2011, a riot broke out in the city amidst the 20th anniversary of Independence Day that led to 16 deaths and 100 injuries according to official numbers. Kazakh security forces opened fire on protestors who demanded better working conditions. During that time, the price for a litre of liquefied petroleum gas (LPG), a mix of butane and propane that is a common vehicle fuel in Zhanaozen, was around 30–35 tenge and has repeatedly risen since then.

Following further protests in 2018 and Nazarbayev's crackdown on the demonstrations, he was made the Chairman of the Security Council of Kazakhstan for life.

Since January 2019, the Kazakh government phased transition policy to electronic market trading of LPG to gradually end state gas subsidies and allow for the market instead to determine prices, resulting with increased LPG prices according to Eurasianet.

In January 2020, a protest was held in Zhanaozen where city residents demanded a reduction in the price of gas that had risen from 55 to 65 tenge. As the COVID-19 pandemic affected the economy, austerity measures and an inadequate amount of economic stimulus from the government resulted with inflation and stagnant wages.

Since 1 January 2022, according to Zhanaozen protesters, the price of LPG almost doubled, to 120 tenge per litre (€0.24 per litre; US$1.06 per gallon), causing outrage amongst citizens. Further discontent with the former leader Nursultan Nazarbayev, the nation's oligarchy, corruption and economic inequality would then spark more widespread protests.

=== Aims ===
Aims of the protests reported after the protests had started included calls for major political changes. According to Darkhan Sharipov of the Oyan, Qazaqstan activist group, protestors wanted "real political reforms" and "fair elections", and were angry about "corruption and nepotism". According to The New York Times, protestors wanted heads of local governments (akims) to be directly elected rather than appointed by the president. According to Kazakh Prosecutor General Berik Asylov, under controlled chaos, the operation to remove the country's top leadership was carefully planned. "In fact, it was a coup attempt," he said.

== Protests ==
=== 2 January ===
On the morning of 2 January, residents in the city of Zhanaozen in Mangystau Region blocked roads in protest against an increase in gas prices. The demonstrators called on the akim of the region, Nurlan Nogaev, and Zhanaozen akim Maksat Ibagarov to take measures in stabilising prices and preventing fuel shortages. The residents were met with acting Zhanaozen akim Galym Baijanov who advised the crowd to write a complaint letter to the city administration in which the protestors recalled that their complaints were supposedly ignored by the city officials.

=== 3 January ===
Hundreds of Zhanaozen residents gathered and camped in the city square overnight. As other residents joined the crowd by the afternoon, an estimated 1,000 people were at the square, chanting and demanding direct elections of local leaders. The police officers, while standing at the perimeter of the square during the demonstration, did not intervene. Mangystau akim Nurlan Nogaev and Zhanaozen akim Maksat Ibagarov as well as Kazakh Gas Processing Plant director Nakbergen Tulepov arrived at the square and pledged for the gas prices to be reduced down to 85–90 tenge, which failed to please the demonstrators. Nogaev and his subordinates were forced to flee the square by the angry crowd.

President Kassym-Jomart Tokayev had instructed the government to consider the situation in Mangystau Region by "taking into account economic feasibility in the legal field". He also called on demonstrators to not disturb public order, reminding that Kazakh citizens have the right to publicly express their voice to local and central government in "accordance with the law". A government commission headed by Deputy Prime Minister Eraly Togjanov was formed to consider the socio-economic situation in Mangystau.

Reports of arrests were received from the cities of Astana, Aktobe and Almaty where the Republic Square and Astana Square were closed off and security officers deployed. Other cities witnessed an increased police presence in public areas.

In Aktau, a group of protestors showed up at the Yntymaq Square in front of the city administration building, setting up tents and yurts for the encampment. By evening, an estimated 6,000 demonstrators were at the square, demanding reductions in the cost of gas as well as the resignation of the government. They were joined by other groups of supporters reportedly from neighbouring regions and cities across Kazakhstan. Mangystau akim Nurlan Nogaev visited the rally, reminding the crowd that the Kazakh government had reduced the price of gas and that the Agency for the Protection and Development of Competition had launched an antitrust probe into gas suppliers for a suspected price collusion; he urged the protestors to maintain public order and suggested that they hold a constructive dialogue with the authorities.

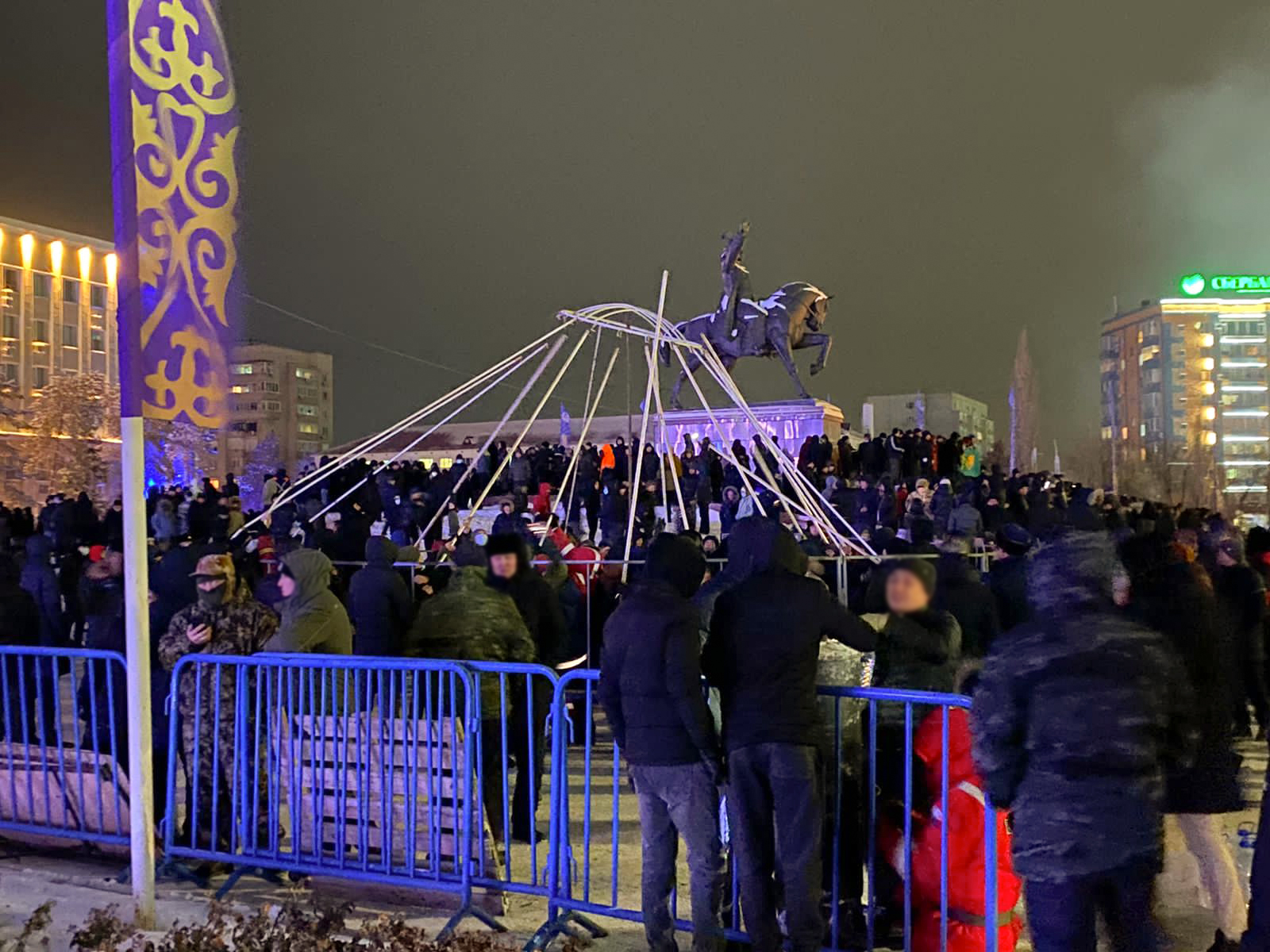
Protesters setting up a yurt in Aktobe, 4 January 2022.

=== 4 January ===
On the night of 4 January, around 1,000 marched to the Republic Square in Almaty which was cordoned off by the police. From there, clashes broke out between both parties with the security forces using stun grenades and tear gas to disperse the protesters who in-turn vandalized police cars and setting some of them ablaze. Armoured military vehicles were spotted throughout the streets of Almaty during the night of unrest which, videos on social media later showed chasing protesters.

President Tokayev signed decrees to introduce a state of emergency in Mangystau District and Almaty from 5 January 01:30 local time to 19 January 00:00 local time. According to Tokayev, all legitimate demands of protesters will be considered. A special commission, after meeting with protesters, agreed to lower the LPG price to 50 tenges ($0.11) per litre. Internet watchdog organization NetBlocks documented significant internet disruptions with "high impact to mobile services" that were likely to limit the public's ability to express political discontent. People also started protesting in Taldıqorğan.

=== 5 January ===
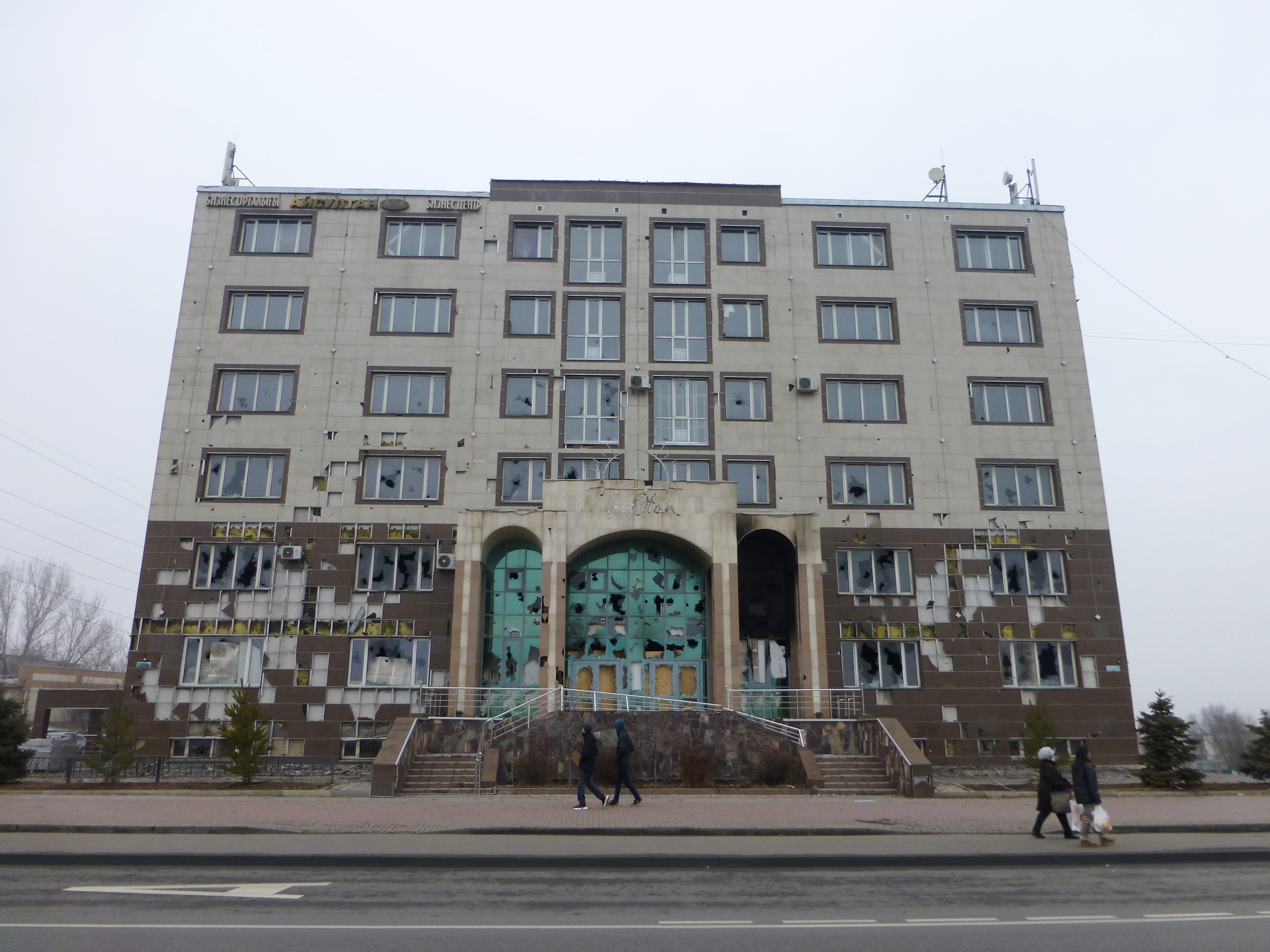
Ruling Nur Otan party office in Almaty after being vandalized by protesters

At 04:00, Almaty akim Bakhytzhan Sagintayev made a video address to the residents, asserting that the situation in the city had been brought under control. From there, he accused of "provocateurs from within and outside" being behind in destabilization and extremist actions and urged people not to succumb to "provocations and lawlessness". In spite of Sagintayev's remarks, explosions of stun grenades were continued to be heard throughout Almaty in early morning with protesters setting up barricades and clashing with the National Guard in central streets.

President Tokayev accepted the government's resignation. On the same day, a Reuters correspondent reported thousands of protesters pressing ahead towards Almaty city centre after security forces failed to disperse them with tear gas and stun grenades. Later on the same day, Tokayev announced that former president Nursultan Nazarbayev has resigned as the Chairman of the Security Council of Kazakhstan, and Tokayev has assumed this position himself. Digital rights monitor NetBlocks reported that internet disruptions had intensified by 5:00 p.m. local time, leaving Kazakhstan in the "midst of a nation-scale internet blackout" after a day of mobile internet disruptions and partial restrictions.

- Mayor's building on fire, Almaty, January 5

In Almaty, as the protesters had reached the Republic Square again, the offices of the city mayor were stormed and set aflame. Locations that stored firearms were captured by protesters including the National Security Committee building and were shown to be distributed to others throughout the city. Protests at the Almaty International Airport resulted in cancelled and rerouted flights. The government reported protesters seizing five planes. Two Kazakh army soldiers were reported killed attempting to retake the Almaty airport. Russian state-run media reported that protesters also attacked President Tokayev's home with rifles and grenades, leaving it partially destroyed. In addition, the offices of the ruling Nur Otan party were also set on fire. Atameken, Kazakhstan's business lobby group, reported attacks on banks, stores and restaurants.

The interior ministry reported government buildings were also attacked in the southern cities of Shymkent and Taraz. In Taldıqorğan, a statue of former leader Nazarbayev was pulled down and destroyed by demonstrators chanting "Old man, leave!".

In the late afternoon, President Tokayev announced a nationwide state of emergency until 19 January. This would include a curfew from 23:00 to 07:00, temporary restrictions on movement, and a ban on mass gatherings. During a televised address, Tokayev threatened to crackdown on protesters, stating "I plan to act as toughly as possible", and said that he had no intentions of fleeing the country.

By around late evening, chaos had broken out in Almaty as large numbers of riot police began to arrive as automatic gunshots were being heard throughout the city with armed demonstrators and security forces exchanging fire while residents were urged to stay away from the streets by loudspeakers. Various state-media agency buildings stationed in Almaty were burnt down and looting had taken place in which grocery stores, banks, ATMs, and shopping centers were targeted.

=== 6 January ===
Oil production at Kazakhstan's highest-producing oil field Tengiz was reduced. US oil producer Chevron Corporation holds a 50% stake in Tengizchevroil (TCO) which operates the Tengiz oil field.

Kazakhstan's Interior Ministry issued a statement saying: "Employees of the Almaty police department have launched a mop-up operation in the streets of Karasay-batyr and Masanchi. Measures are being taken to detain the violators. In total, some 2,000 people have been taken to police stations."

Dozens of protesters and at least 12 police officers were killed with one police officer who was found beheaded. Witnesses in Almaty described scenes of chaos with government buildings stormed or set on fire and widespread looting. The interior ministry said 2,298 people had been arrested during the unrest, while the police spokesperson Saltanat Azirbek told state news channel Khabar 24 that "dozens of attackers were liquidated".

3,000 Russian paratroopers arrived in Kazakhstan on the morning of 6 January, after president Tokayev made a formal request for assistance to the Collective Security Treaty Organization. Armenia, Belarus, Kyrgyzstan and Tajikistan also sent troops.

Protestors remained in the Aktau town square on 6 January. Six thousand people protested in the centre of Zhanaozen. The akim of Zhanoazen, Maksat Ibagarov, stated that "none of the local activists [would] be persecuted".

National Security Committee chief Karim Massimov was arrested, per the official account, after being detained the previous day on 5 January.

=== 7 January ===
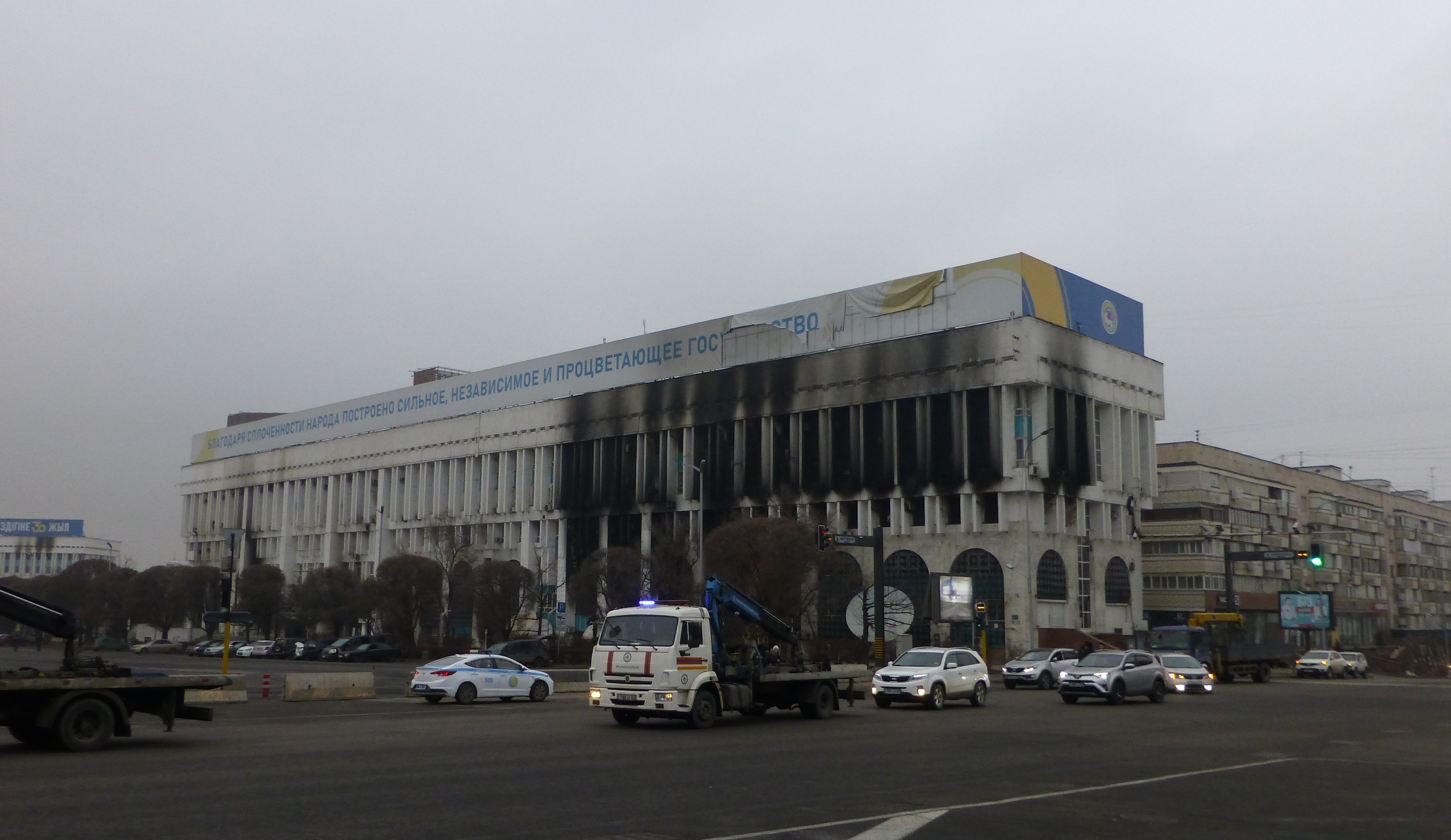
Burned building in Republic Square, Almaty

On 7 January, as a concession, President Tokayev said that the vehicle fuel price caps of 50 tenge per litre had been restored for six months.

Tokayev said in a statement, "Constitutional order has largely been restored in all regions of the country." He also announced that he had ordered troops to shoot without warning at anyone protesting, calling protesters 'bandits and terrorists' and saying use of force will continue. In a speech to the nation, he said, "We hear calls from abroad for the parties to negotiate to find a peaceful solution to the problems, this is just nonsense. What negotiations can there be with criminals and murderers? They need to be destroyed and this will be done." He went on to thank Russia for sending troops to help establish order.

Russia's Defence Ministry stated that more than 70 planes were flying, around the clock, to bring Russian troops into Kazakhstan and that they were helping to control Almaty's main airport. According to several Russian media sources, former president Nursultan Nazarbayev had left the country with his three daughters and their families. It was not immediately clear where Nazarbayev had gone, but some sources claimed he had left due to poor health. At the same time, only two of his relatives remained in Kazakhstan, and one (his nephew Samat Abiš) was detained by authorities.

However, by most accounts, the former president remained in the capital of Kazakhstan.

A peaceful protest took place in Zhanaozen, where protestors asked for a new government, more freedom for civil rights activists, and a return to the 1993 Kazakh constitution. Protests also continued in Aktau.

The Kazakh government announced that seven additional policemen had been killed in Almaty. Levan Kogeashvili, a 22-year-old Israeli national was shot and killed while driving to work in Almaty. The Israeli Foreign Ministry stated that he had been residing in Kazakhstan for several years and his family said that he was not involved in the protests.

=== 8 January ===
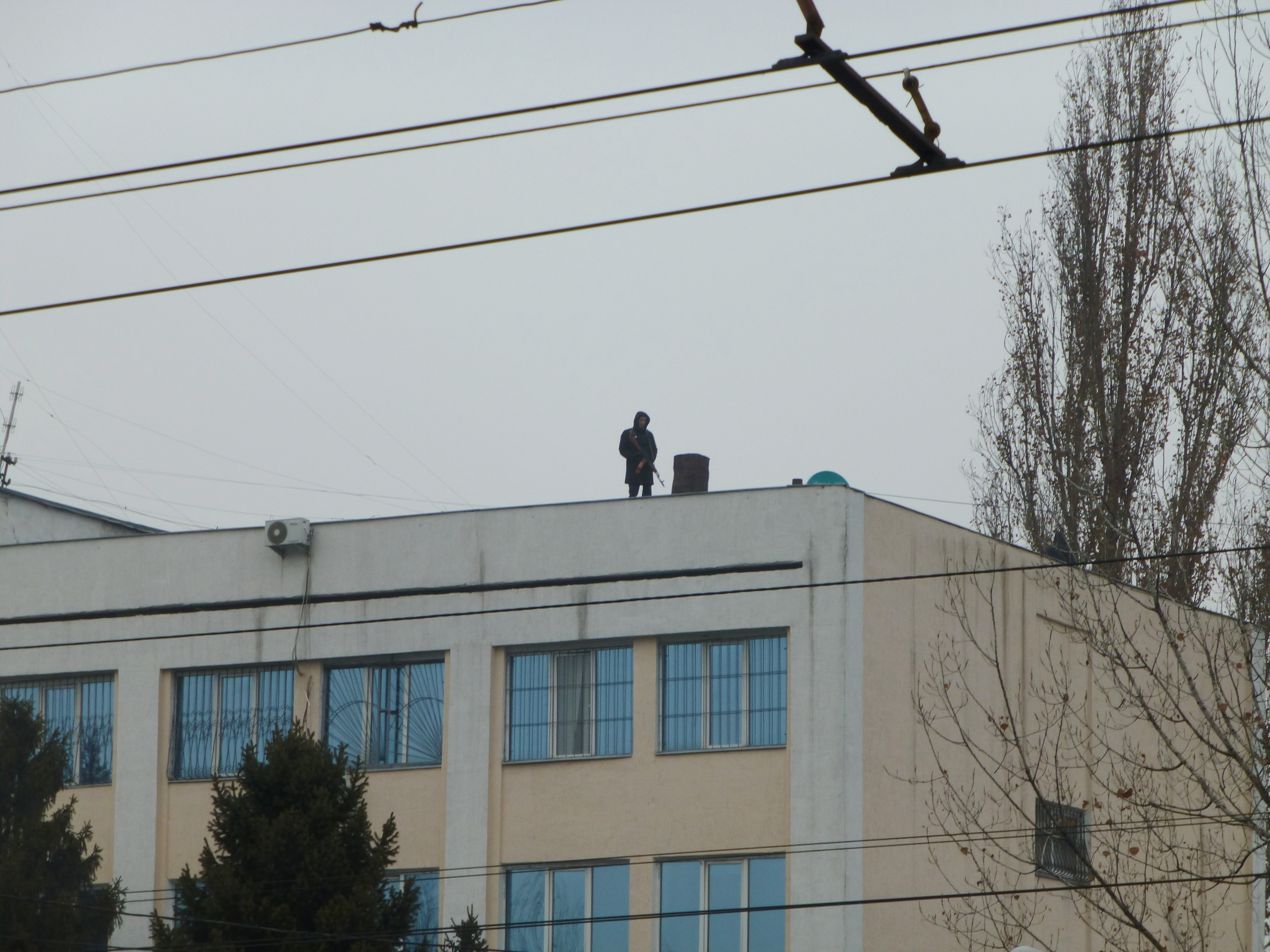
Armed militant patroller on the roof top of the Auezov District Department of Internal Affairs in Almaty, 8 January 2022

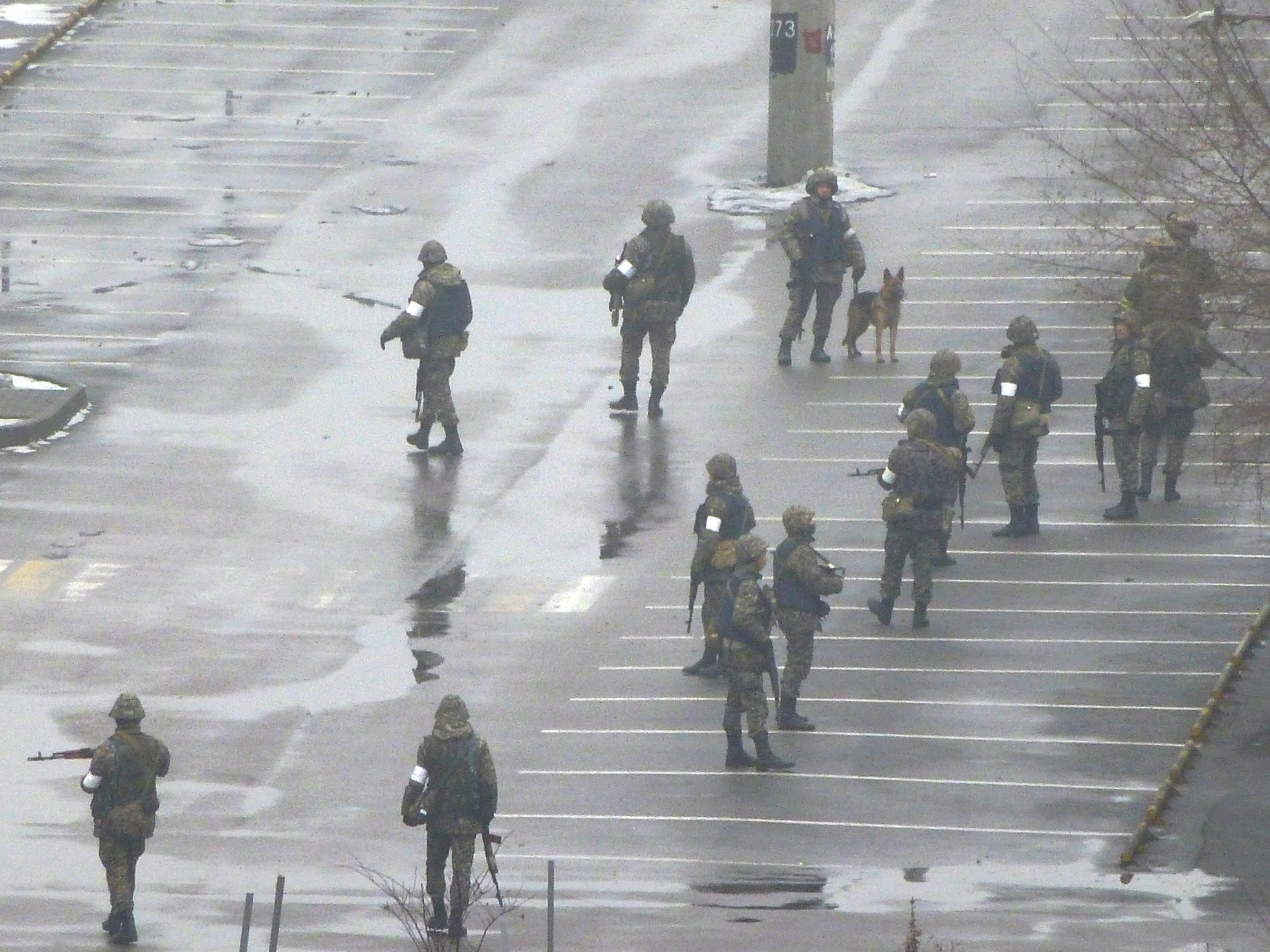
Kazakh forces in search of anti-government militants, 8 January 2022

Protests continued in Zhanaozen.

The National Security Committee said that its former chief and former prime minister, Karim Massimov, had been arrested on suspicion of treason.

The Ministry of Internal Affairs announced that 4,404 people had been detained and at least 40 people had died as a result of the protests.

Kazakhstan authorities launched a countrywide antitrust investigation into 180 LNG sellers due to a suspected collusion.

=== 9 January ===
On 9 January, the interior ministry, said initial estimates put property damage at about 175 million euros, adding that more than 100 businesses and banks had been attacked and looted and about 400 vehicles destroyed. The ministry confirmed that more than 160 people had been killed and more than 5,000 had been arrested for questioning as part of 125 separate investigations into the unrest. The Interior Ministry reported more than 2,200 people sought treatment for injuries from the protests, and about 1,300 security officers were injured. The office of Kazakhstan's president said that in total 5,800 people had been detained. The health ministry said in total 164 people, including two children, had been killed. It also specified that 103 people had died in Kazakhstan's largest city, Almaty. Interior Minister Erlan Turgumbayev held a press conference, saying, "Today the situation is stabilised in all regions of the country ... the counterterror operation is continuing in a bid to re-establish order in the country".

=== 10 January ===
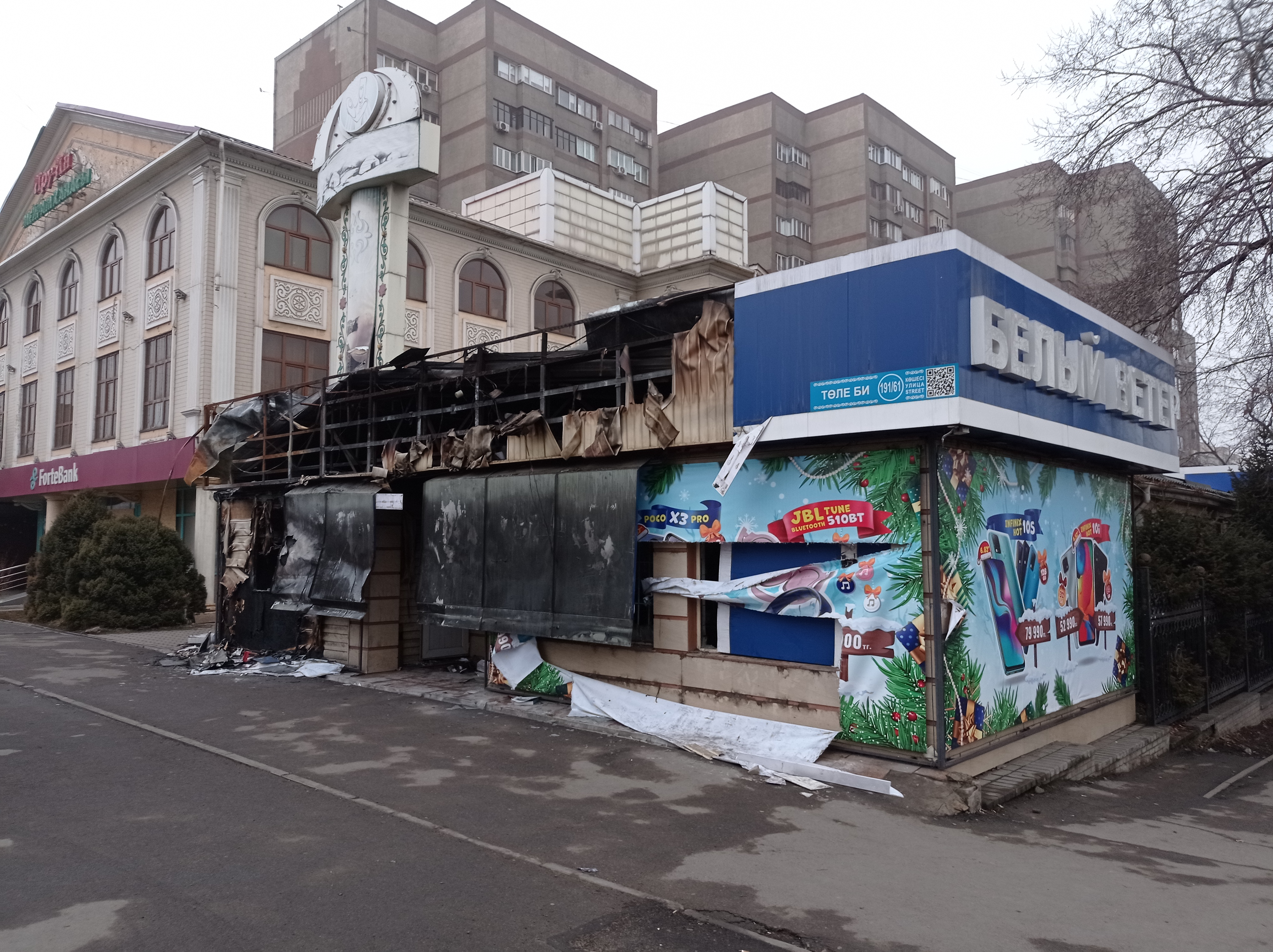
Electronics store after being ravaged by looters in Almaty, 10 January 2022

On 10 January, the government declared a day of mourning for the victims of the protests. Kazakhstan's Interior Ministry reported that a total of 7,939 people have been detained across the country. The National Security Committee, Kazakhstan's counterintelligence and anti-terrorism agency, said that the situation in the country had "stabilized and is under control." Tokayev called the protests a "coup attempt." The government also stated that "foreign-trained Islamist radicals" were among those who had attacked government buildings and security forces in the last week and that police had then detained almost 8,000 people to bring the situation under control.

Internet service was restored in Almaty following a five-day blackout.

Military general and politician Zhanat Suleimenov committed suicide, at the age of 59, after a criminal case was opened against him during the protests.

=== 11 January ===
On 11 January, in a speech to an online meeting of the CSTO military alliance by video link, Tokayev said that order had now been restored in Kazakhstan and called the protests over. He announced that the CSTO had completed its mission in Kazakhstan and would begin withdrawing from the country on 13 January and would be fully withdrawn in the next 10 days. Russian President Vladimir Putin claimed victory in defending Kazakhstan from what he described as a "foreign-backed terrorist uprising", and promised leaders of other ex-Soviet states that a Moscow-led alliance (CSTO) would protect them too.

In a speech to parliament regarding the past days, Tokayev promised reform and acknowledged public discontent over income inequality and criticized Nazarbayev and his associates due to their wealth. He said the public discontent was justified and that he wanted associates of the former president, Nursultan Nazarbayev, to share their wealth to the people. Tokayev told parliament, "Thanks to Nazarbayev, a group of very profitable companies emerged in the country as well as a group of people wealthy even by international standards, I think it is time they pay their dues to the people of Kazakhstan and help them on a systemic and regular basis." He went on to say that the financial system is dominated by large business groups, "based on the principle 'everything for friends, and laws for everyone else'". He spoke of initiatives to narrow the wealth gap, raise taxes on the mining sector, and eliminate irregularities in state procurement and areas where associates of Nazarbayev have business interests.

The Interior Ministry mentioned that security forces had detained over 9,900 people in connection with the protests. Tokayev nominated a new prime minister, Älihan Smaiylov. International flights were resumed to and from the country's capital, Astana.

== Violence ==
On 5 January, authorities in Almaty reported that over 400 businesses were damaged from the protests and that 200 people had been arrested; police in Atyrau fired into protesters which resulted in the death of at least one individual. The government reported on 5 January that eight law enforcement personnel were killed and 317 were wounded. A report carried by the French AFP news agency stated that dozens of protestors had been killed, while the Russian TASS news agency aired footage of a heavy gunfight near Almaty's Republic Square. On 6 January, dozens of protestors were killed during an operation, while the number of security forces killed rose to 18. According to local authorities, two of the security officers were found decapitated.

Delivering his report on 5 January 2023, Kazakh Minister of Internal Affairs Marat Akhmetzhanov said that on the night of 5 Jan., rallies were organised in several regions, with highways and railways being closed and railway stations and airports blocked.

"At the same time, in the cities of Taraz, Aktobe, Atyrau, Shymkent, and Uralsk, the buildings of the akimats [city hall] were attacked as a symbol of state power. Violence was used against workers everywhere, resulting in many serious injuries. Buildings, official cars, and video surveillance cameras were damaged. In short, this is not a peaceful rally at all," said the minister.

On 7 January, President Tokayev stated that the army and law enforcement agencies had been ordered "to shoot to kill without warning."

By 19 January, the death toll of the unrest reportedly reached 227.

== Analysis ==
According to the report presented by Kazakh Prosecutor General Berik to the Kazakh Parliament on 5 January 2023, the riots were "orchestrated by organised criminal groups." "All I can say is that throughout 2021 there was covert preparation of the perpetrators for radical measures. Organised criminal groups were among the perpetrators. They recruited people, armed themselves, and bought walkie-talkies and vehicles. The investigation revealed that some security officers were involved in this subversive work," said Asylov.

In this regard, former National Security Committee (NSC) Chair Karim Massimov and his former Deputy Anuar Sadykulov were sentenced for treason, abuse of power, and actions aimed at violently seizing power, while former NSC Deputy Chair Daulet Yergozhin was sentenced for abuse of power and actions aimed at violently seizing power.

Dossym Satpaev, a Kazakh political analyst, said that the Kazakh government would mainly use force to respond to protests, stating: "The authorities are trying everything to calm things down, with a mix of promises and threats, but so far it's not working. ... There will be imitations of dialogue but essentially the regime will respond with force because they have no other tools." Political scientist Arkady Dubnov of the Carnegie Moscow Center observed that such protests were unsettling for the Russian government, with Dubnov saying: "There is no doubt that the Kremlin would not want to see an example of such a regime beginning to talk to the opposition and conceding to their demands."

In an article for Foreign Policy, Eugene Chausovsky wrote that "Tokayev felt the need to get CSTO assistance in order to secure strategic sites and installations, including government buildings and airports in key cities such as Almaty, while Kazakh security forces could focus on handling the demonstrators directly."

Joanna Lillis, writing in Eurasianet on 7 January, described Tokayev's shoot to kill declared policy and his terminology, including "bandits and terrorists ... to be eliminated", as resembling that of Russian president Vladimir Putin. Lillis saw this as a significant change from Tokayev's earlier promises of liberalising the political situation and consulting civil society. She interpreted the dismissal and arrest of Karim Massimov, head of the National Security Committee and close to Nazarbayev, together with a statement by Nazarbayev's former adviser Ermukhamet Ertysbayev that a coup d'état had been attempted, as signs of a significant shift of power within the Kazakh political elites from Nazarbayev to Tokayev. She considered the claims of an attempted coup d'état to be credible. Other analysts dispute this, as no details were provided upon Massimov's arrest on what actions could have represented an attempted overthrow of the government.

Hans-Henning Schröder, a political scientist and expert on Russia, told Deutsche Welle: "All of Russia's major neighbors have been rocked by social unrest. If I were in the Kremlin, I would start to worry about whether Russia could be next."

Daniil Kislov, the founder and General Director of the Ferghana Information Agency, speculated to The New York Times that the violence in Almaty was "all artificially organized by people who really had power in their hands," as a proxy for a power struggle between Tokayev and former president Nazarbayev. Kislov claimed that Nazarbayev's nephew Samat Abish, who was previously deputy head of the Kazakh State Security Service before being ousted by Tokayev, was responsible for orchestrating much of the violence. Galym Ageleulov, a human rights activist in Almaty, stated that the violence only started in Almaty when a crowd that was "clearly organized by crime group marauders" started the march to the City Hall, while at the same time police presence dissipated.

Sergey Khestanov, macroeconomic adviser to the general director of Otkritie-Broker, claimed that the massive protests weren't caused directly due to economic factors, suggesting Kazakhstan's high standard of living within the former Soviet Union comparably to Russia and that the average age in Kazakhstan being relatively young leads to higher social activity, which played role in fueling discontent due to "a sufficiently long, stable and powerful economic growth" being "sharply inhibited".

== Economic impact ==
=== Global market ===
As Kazakhstan produces more than 40% of the world's uranium, uranium prices rose after the protests erupted. Canadian uranium company Cameco stated that "any disruption in Kazakhstan could of course be a significant catalyst in the uranium market. If nothing else, it's a reminder for utilities that an over-reliance on any one source of supply is risky." The internet blackout also impacted cryptocurrency mining operations, with the global cryptocurrency computational capacity (hashrate) dropping by 12 per cent. Prior to the protests, Kazakhstan accounted for around 18 per cent of global hashrate for Bitcoin, due to the fact that neighbouring China in 2021 banned the mining of cryptocurrencies and many of the cryptominers moved to Kazakhstan.

Craig Erlam, senior market analyst at OANDA, suggested that further oil production outages during protests could impact global oil prices by reaching the October 2021 peak and possibly three-digit prices as well. According to Chevron Corporation, which operates Tengiz Field, the production of oil was reduced after its contractors had disrupted railway lines in support of the protests. However just days later, Chevron announced that it would be gradually increasing its output again.

=== Economy ===
During the protests and riot in Kazakhstan, the fortune of four local billionaires shrank by $3 billion according to Forbes. At the same time, the middle daughter and son-in-law of former President Nursultan Nazarbayev, Dinara and Timur Kulibayev, lost $200 million. The couple controls the country's largest bank in terms of assets, Halyk Bank; the fortune of each co-owner is estimated at $3.1 billion. One of the most affected billionaires was Kazakh businessman Vyacheslav Kim, who is the chairman of the board of directors of the fintech company Kaspi Bank. In two days, its shares fell by 30%, from $188 as of 4 January to $87 on 6 January; according to Forbes, decreasing his fortune by $1.4 billion to $4.2 billion. By the end of the week, his assets grew slightly and were estimated at $4.4 billion. The general director of Kaspi.kz, a billionaire from Georgia Mikhail Lomtadze living in Kazakhstan, lost about $1.4 billion. The size of his fortune fell to $3.8 billion.

== Reactions ==
=== National ===
Speaking from France, the fugitive leader of Democratic Choice of Kazakhstan, Mukhtar Ablyazov, who is wanted in Kazakhstan and Russia on suspicion of embezzling some $5 billion, told Reuters on 7 January 2022: "I see myself as the leader of the opposition". Ablyazov also stated that the West should remove Kazakhstan from Russian influence to prevent Russian President Vladimir Putin from incorporating Kazakhstan into "a structure like the Soviet Union".

=== International ===
==== Collective Security Treaty Organization ====
Member states of the CSTO

Unrest in Kazakhstan caught international observers by surprise. President Tokayev began communications with President of Belarus Alexander Lukashenko, who had quashed the 2020–2021 Belarusian protests, and was in discussions with President of Russia Vladimir Putin, calling for the Collective Security Treaty Organization (CSTO) to intervene against protesters that he described as "international terrorists". Prime Minister of Armenia Nikol Pashinyan, who had just been made chairman of the CSTO on 3 January 2022, responded to Tokayev's request, stating "As the Chairman of the CPC Assembly Security Council, I am starting immediate consultations with the leaders of the CSTO countries".

On 6 January, the CSTO agreed to intervene in Kazakhstan with a collective group of forces that it described as having the aim of peacekeeping, with the organization citing the Collective Security Treaty's Article 4, which states "In the case of aggression (an armed attack threatening safety, stability, territorial integrity and sovereignty) against any Member States, all other Member States at the request of this Member State shall immediately provide the latter with the necessary aid, including military". Pashinyan said that the CSTO was to be deployed due to "the threats to national security and sovereignty to the Republic of Kazakhstan, including from external interference". A Russian Air Force regiment in Orenburg was reported to be readying itself for deployment to Kazakhstan. Russia's Ministry of Foreign Affairs spokeswoman Maria Zakharova said: "Peacekeeping forces of the Collective Security Treaty Organization were sent to the Republic of Kazakhstan for a limited time to stabilize and normalize the situation." She confirmed armed forces of Russia, Belarus, Armenia, Tajikistan and Kyrgyzstan were sent to Kazakhstan as part of the wider CSTO effort. According to CSTO, its armed forces are only authorised to participate in the protection of strategic infrastructure facilities, including Almaty International Airport and Russia's Baikonur Cosmodrome in south-central Kazakhstan. Russian State Duma member Leonid Kalashnikov stated that actions in relation to the protesters themselves were to be handled by local Kazakhstani law enforcement.

On 7 January, the Belarusian Telegraph Agency reported that President Lukashenko "discussed in detail the state of affairs in Kazakhstan" via phone with former president and chair of Security Council of Kazakhstan, Nazarbayev.

On 11 January, Tokayev announced that the CSTO had completed its mission in Kazakhstan and would begin withdrawing from the country on 13 January; they were fully withdrawn by 19 January.

==== Shanghai Cooperation Organisation ====
On 7 January, the Shanghai Cooperation Organisation's regional anti-terrorist structure announced that it was ready to extend assistance to Kazakhstan upon request, and voiced support for the Kazakh government's security measures.

=== By country ===
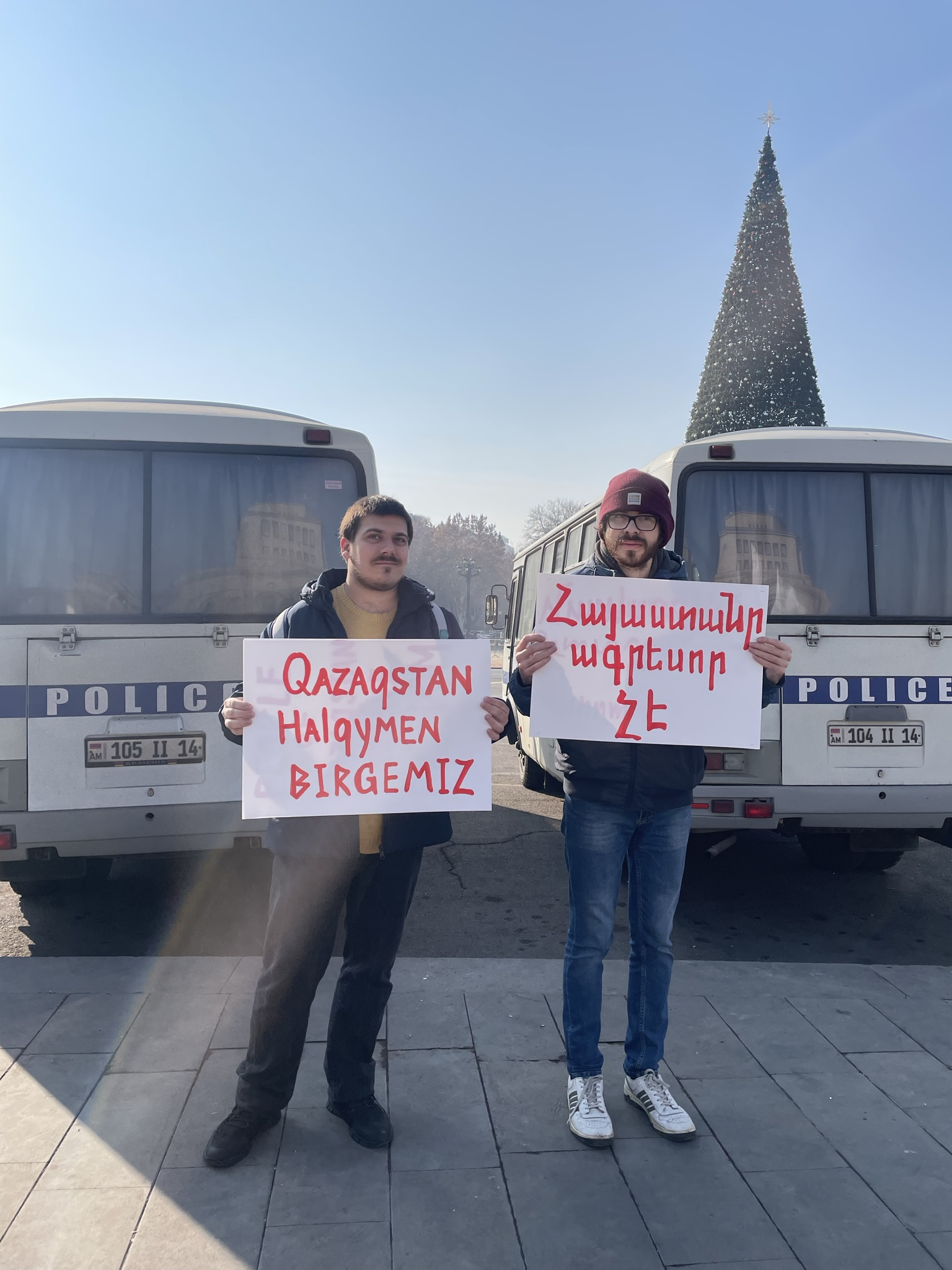
Yerevan residents protesting against Armenian involvement in the CSTO intervention in Kazakhstan

- Islamic Emirate of Afghanistan: The Afghan Foreign Ministry spokesperson Fazilrabi Zahin published a statement saying the administration is "closely monitoring the situation in Kazakhstan and, as a close neighbor and economic partner state, is concerned about the recent unrest." The ministry also "urges both the government and protestors to resolve issues through talks and peaceful means, and to return calm and stability to the country."
- Armenia: Currently chairing at CSTO, Armenia started consultations among CSTO member countries and sent 100 soldiers to peacekeeping mission, citing protection of water source and one of the largest bread factories as the main aims of its deployed troops. However, Armenians took dim view of Armenia's participation in CSTO mission to Kazakhstan, with many citizens objecting that the CSTO did not help Armenia when it asked for help in 2021-2022 Armenia–Azerbaijan border crisis, and pointing out at the irony of the Pashinyan's government itself coming to power as the result of street protests. "The people of any country must choose their own government; no other country has the right to interfere in its internal affairs. Today, the Armenian armed forces have a mission to protect the borders of our country. We condemn the short-sighted and irresponsible actions of the Armenian government." a coalition of Armenian NGOs said in a statement.
- Azerbaijan: The Azerbaijani Ministry of Foreign Affairs had expressed condolences on 10 January "to the families and loved ones of people who lost their lives in a number of regions of the country, brotherly Kazakh people. We wish Kazakhstan peace, stability, peace and well-being."
- Belarus: President Alexander Lukashenko called on demonstrators to negotiate with President Tokayev who called him as "a decent person, a diplomat" and "very intelligent and educated man", telling "It's a lesson for us. One more lesson. In the sense that we now understand what could have happened to us." State Secretary of the Belarusian Security Council Alexander Volfovich on 6 January described the Kazakh unrest as an "external hybrid threat" that aims to destroy a legitimate government via unconstitutional methods similarly to a colour revolution. He called on the Belarusian military personnel to be deployed in Kazakhstan "to provide assistance to the fraternal people of Kazakhstan, prevent the situation from aggravating and send peacekeeping forces there."
- Canada: The Canadian Minister of Foreign Affairs issued a statement saying it was "closely monitoring the unrest". It called for "restraint and de-escalation" and that the situation be resolved "quickly and peacefully".
- China: The Chinese Foreign Affairs Ministry spokesperson Wang Wenbin expressed that China and Kazakhstan shared friendly relations and are strategic partners and "hopes for early restoration of public order" in Kazakhstan and also reiterated that the matter is an "interior affair of Kazakhstan" and believes in the ability of the "Kazakh authorities to resolve the issue properly". Wang hoped for a speedy stabilization of the situation. On 7 January, General Secretary of the Chinese Communist Party Xi Jinping stated that "China opposes external forces that deliberately trigger unrest and incite a 'colour revolution' in Kazakhstan".
- France: Foreign Minister Jean-Yves Le Drian on 6 January called the events in Kazakhstan "worrying" and urged all parties "to show moderation and open a dialogue". President Emmanuel Macron expressed his concern in regards with the deadly unrest, adding that he would continue in monitoring the situation.
- Germany: Federal Foreign Office spokesman Christofer Burger said that the officials were looking into the reports of Tokayev's shooting order, telling "it must be said very clearly that a use of lethal force, of live ammunition against civilians can only be a very last resort, particularly if military forces are deployed."
- Hungary: Foreign Minister Péter Szijjártó in a video briefing stated that violent protesters need to be held accountable and concerns over human rights have "no place" when it comes to restoring order, saying that "Destabilization efforts or coups are completely opposed to Hungary's security interests" and that "Hungary supports efforts to restore peace and order in central Asia, specifically Kazakhstan."
- India: The Ministry of External Affairs spokesperson Arindam Bagchi stated that events in Kazakhstan were being closely followed, and extended "deepest condolences to families of innocent victims who have lost lives in the violence". The statement hoped for "an early stabilization of the situation". The Indian community in Kazakhstan of about 7,800 – including 5,300 students and some 1,000 construction workers – was reportedly safe. The violence erupted at a time when leaders of the five Central Asian states were expected to be chief guests at India's Republic Day celebrations on January 26.
- Iran: Foreign Ministry spokesperson Saeed Khatibzadeh stated, "We believe that the wise government and nation of the friendly, brotherly and neighborly country can resolve their problems and disputes peacefully and through dialog, without foreign interference and based on their own national interests."
- Kyrgyzstan: The Kyrgyz Ministry of Foreign Affairs called on a "civilized dialogue within a legal framework" to prevent a "further escalation of the situation", hoping for Kazakhstan to resolve the current crisis "independently and without outside interference" while positioning Kyrgyzstan as strategic partner by conforming its readiness to "provide all possible support to the brotherly Kazakhstan, if necessary." During a telephone conversion between leaders of CTSO on 5 January, President Sadyr Japarov expressed concern about the reports of casualties, numerous cases of looting and pogroms, and other cases of violence. Japarov later expressed condolences to President Tokayev and the Kazakh people, wishing for "stability, unity, peace and prosperity."
- Malaysia: Minister of Foreign Affairs Saifuddin Abdullah stated that Wisma Putra is monitoring the developments closely. He also confirmed that 50 Malaysians in the country are in safe condition.
- Mongolia: The Mongolian Ministry of Foreign Affairs advised its citizens to not attend demonstrations and rallies and that it would continue to monitor the situation closely.
- Pakistan: The Foreign Ministry of Pakistan formed 'help desks' within its embassies in Almaty and Astana in an attempt to facilitate Pakistanis in Kazakhstan requiring emergency services.
- Romania: The Ministry of Foreign Affairs of Romania stated that it was closely following the unrest in Kazakhstan since its inception. It also declared that it had been in contact with the around 100 Romanian citizens in the country and that the personnel of the Romanian embassy in Astana were not in danger, and called for a peaceful and inclusive settlement of the situation without the need to resort to violence.
- Russia: President Vladimir Putin claimed victory on 10 January in defending Kazakhstan from what he described as a "foreign-backed terrorist uprising", promising regional allies that a Moscow-led alliance (CSTO) would protect them from colour revolutions. Putin also drew a parallel between the Kazakh protests and the Euromaidan protests and referenced other pro-democracy movements that toppled allied leaders in Georgia, and Kyrgyzstan.
  - Bashkortostan: Head Radiy Khabirov after meeting with Kazakh officials on 19 January said, "When the 'well-known events' began in Kazakhstan, we were in touch with our colleagues, wishing them good luck and strength. And we were absolutely sure that the people of Kazakhstan would choose the right path of development."
  - Chechnya: In a joint live Instagram broadcast, Head Ramzan Kadyrov called on Kazakh citizens to not destroy the state and compared the events with the beginning of the Chechen War.
- Serbia: President Aleksandar Vučić stated that in Kazakhstan there will be "hundreds or thousands of dead, a devastated country" and that "foreign services, various great powers, have also intervened".
- South Korea: Ministry of Foreign Affairs expressed hope for the restoration of peace in Kazakhstan and that South Korea will closely monitor political situations and take measures for the safety for its nationals residing in the country.
- Tajikistan: The Tajik Foreign Affairs Ministry on 6 January expressed concerns over violence, seizure of government buildings and looting as well as emergence of armed groups sharing support to the Kazakh government in attempts at stabilizing the situation and that the "wise people of Kazakhstan and their leadership will put an end to acts of violence in the shortest possible time through dialogue." That same day, the Ministry issued a travel warning as well as guidelines towards Tajik citizens in Kazakhstan "to exercise maximum vigilance and avoid crowded places."
- Turkey: President Recep Tayyip Erdoğan told Tokayev in a phone call that Turkey stands in solidarity with Kazakhstan. The Turkish Grand National Assembly issued a solidarity message with the participation of the ruling Justice and Development Party (AKP), along with the opposition Republican People's Party (CHP), Nationalist Movement Party (MHP) and Good Party (İYİ Party), in which they expressed support to the Kazakh government's reform agenda to further improve the well-being and welfare of the people.
- Turkmenistan: President Gurbanguly Berdimuhamedow in a letter to Tokayev expressed deep condolences in response to high casualties and injuries resulting from the days of violent unrest. Berdimuhamedow expressed sympathy and support to the families and relatives of the victims, as well as wishes for quick recovery to the injured.
- Ukraine: The Ukrainian Ministry of Foreign Affairs issued statement to which it condemned violence and expressed condolences with the deaths and urged for the conflict to de-escalate and foreign deployed CSTO troops to respect sovereignty of Kazakhstan and not to maintain presence beyond the declared time period.
- United Arab Emirates: Abu Dhabi Crown Prince Mohamed bin Zayed Al Nahyan during phone call with President Tokayev on 10 January "expressed his confidence in the ability of the Kazakhstan government and people to overcome this difficult period quickly."
- United Kingdom: Foreign Secretary Liz Truss, in the House of Commons, condemned the violence and said that the British government would be coordinating with allies.
- United States: The U.S. government appealed for calm while reported by The Independent to be monitoring the unrest. U.S. Secretary of State Antony Blinken questioned Kazakhstan's decision to seek CSTO's military assistance, saying that "one lesson of recent history is that once Russians are in your house, it's sometimes very difficult to get them to leave".
- Uzbekistan: The Uzbek Ministry of Foreign Affairs called the events "alarming" and that it would continue monitoring the development of the situation with a written statement saying "We are convinced that the wise people of Kazakhstan will be able to prevent the escalation of instability, avoid violence and human casualties" and that the people of Kazakhstan "have the necessary determination and will to preserve unity, restore peace and tranquility in the country and independently overcome the problems that have arisen." In a 10 January letter, President Shavkat Mirziyoyev expressed deep condolences to President Tokayev and the Kazakh citizens in connection with the numerous victims and serious injuries among the servicemen and the population, as well as significant damage as a result in the aftermath of the conflict.

==== Entities with limited recognition ====
- Republic of Artsakh: The President of Artsakh Arayik Harutyunyan stated that the most effective and efficient mechanism for preventing the escalating danger and avoiding new disasters was the entry of the CSTO peacekeeping forces into Kazakhstan. He added that extremist groups and formations are behind the plans on destabilizing the situation. According to the Artsakh's Foreign Minister David Babayan these are the planned actions of Turkey and pan-Turkic circles to implement a dangerous expansionist project, and that more than 20,000 militants arrived in Kazakhstan likely through the territory of Turkey and Azerbaijan.

=== By international union ===
- European Union: On 5 January 2022, the EU issued a statement saying: "We call on all concerned to act with responsibility and restraint and to refrain from actions that could lead to further escalation of violence. While recognising the right to peaceful demonstration, the European Union expects that they remain non-violent and avoid any incitement to violence".
- The Organization of Turkic States stated "their confidence in the capacity of the Kazakh authorities to peacefully defuse tensions and reestablish calm and order."
- United Nations: On 6 January, the United Nations High Commissioner for Human Rights, Michelle Bachelet called on all sides in Kazakhstan to refrain from violence and to seek a peaceful resolution to their grievances following mass unrest after days of demonstrations. In a statement, Bachelet said: "People have the right to peaceful protest and freedom of expression. At the same time, protesters, no matter how angry or aggrieved they may be, should not resort to violence against others". On 10 January, the United Nations criticised Kazakhstan over photos showing military personnel wearing United Nations peacekeeper helmets. United Nations spokesman Stephane Dujarric said the United Nations had complained to Kazakhstan's diplomatic outpost in New York about the apparent use of United Nations peacekeeping equipment and said the issue "had been addressed".
- NATO: On 7 January, NATO's Deputy Assistant Secretary General for Political Affairs & Security Policy and Special Representative for the Caucasus & Central Asia, Javier Colomina, said on Twitter: "NATO shares the serious concern over the situation in Kazakhstan, including reports of casualties. We call on all parties to exercise restraint, refrain from violence, and pursue dialogue. Authorities must respect international human rights obligations, including the right to peaceful protest".
- Organization for Security and Co-operation in Europe (OSCE): on 5 January the Chairman-in-Office of the OSCE, Zbigniew Rau, declared "I call for a peaceful return to order and respect for democratic processes, while rights and freedoms, including freedom of assembly and freedom of expression, must be protected."

== Legacy ==
After hearing the official version of the events at the Mazhilis session, Mazhilis Chairman Yerlan Koshanov stressed the importance of ensuring the January tragedy does not happen again.

On 23 December 2022, Kassym-Jomart Tokayev opened a Tagzym memorial dedicated to the victims of the January events (Qantar) in Almaty.

== See also ==
- 2020s in political history
- 2021 global energy crisis
- List of protests in the 21st century
  - 2018–2020 Kazakh protests
  - 2020 Kyrgyz protests
  - 2020–2021 Belarusian protests
  - 2021 Russian protests
  - Euromaidan, protests in Ukraine in 2013–2014
  - List of fuel protests
- Jeltoqsan, December 1986 protests in Almaty, at the time named Alma-Ata
- Zhanaozen massacre, December 2011 protests in the Mangystau Region with 14 protesters killed
