= Kaspi.kz =

Kazakh technology company

- Company type: Public
- Traded as: KASE: KSPI; Nasdaq: KSPI; AIX: KSPI
- Industry: Financial technology
- Headquarters: Kazakhstan
- Key people: Mikheil Lomtadze; Vyacheslav Kim
- Revenue: 1,913.5 billion KZT(2023)
- Operating income: 1,022 billion KZT(2023)
- Net income: 848.8 billion KZT(2023)
- Total assets: 6.8 billion KZT(2023)
- Total equity: $19 billion (2023)
- Subsidiaries: Kaspi Bank; Kaspi Group; Kaspi Shop; Kaspi Office; Kaspi Travel; Kaspi Pay; IC Basel; ARK Balance
- Website: kaspi.kz

Kaspi.kz is a Kazakhstani unicorn company comprising Kaspi Shop LLP, Kaspi Bank JSC, Kaspi Pay LLP and Kaspi Travel LLP. In 2020, it became one of the fastest-growing financial IT organizations in Europe and Eurasia.

== History ==
After purchasing the privatized Caspian Bank in 2002, Vyacheslav Kim founded Kaspi. In 2006, Baring Vostok acquired a stake in the company. In 2007, Mikheil Lomtadze joined the management team and, together with Kim, transformed Kaspi into a Kazakhstani fintech company.

On 15 November 2008, JSC Caspian Bank was rebranded into JSC Kaspi Bank.

On September 16, 2015, per Resolution of the Board of the National Bank of the Republic of Kazakhstan No.166 dated 16 September 2015, Kaspi joint-stock company was granted authorization to acquire the status of (indirect) bank holding company of Kaspi Bank joint-stock company.

On 2 April 2018, Kaspi joint-stock company was renamed as Kaspi.kz joint-stock company.

On 17 September 2019, Kaspi.kz entered the Azerbaijani market after acquiring a number of online services: Turbo.az for placing private car sale and purchase ads, Bina.az for real estate ads, and Tap.az for goods and services.

In July 2021, Kaspi.kz entered the Ukrainian market after acquiring the Portmone Group payment system. In October, Kaspi signed an agreement on the purchase of BTA Bank Ukraine (a subsidiary of Kazakhstan's BTA Bank Kazakhstan). The transaction amounts were not disclosed.

== Payments ==
In 2019, a network was launched for end-to-end payments, enabling the sending and receiving of instant P2P transfers between consumers and merchants via a mobile app and QR technology.

Over the first 9 months of 2020, 1.6 billion payments totaling KZT 15.2 trillion were made through Kaspi.kz, of which 19.1 million were transferred to the state budget.

In July 2020, Kaspi.kz secured ownership of the technology and algorithm for issuing payment cards using a mobile app and Kartomat (card kiosk) by obtaining a patent from the National Institute of Intellectual Property. In September 2020, Kaspi.kz made the license for Kaspi Kartomat open in Kazakhstan.

== Marketplace ==
From 2018 to 2022, Kaspi.kz ranked first among Kazakhstani e-commerce platforms in the TOP KZ Retail E-Commerce ranking in terms of online sales revenue, capturing 70% of the online retail market.

On 28 August 2020, the company acquired the online ticketing company Santufei (Kaspi Travel).

== Cooperation with the state ==
In 2021, in cooperation with the Ministry of Internal Affairs, the company launched a service for car re-registration and inspection via the Kaspi.kz mobile app; a year and a half later, the option to get a driver's license reissued online was added.

In 2023, Kaspi.kz, the Ministry of Finance, and the State Revenue Committee launched the Kaspi Kassa service, which allowed entrepreneurs to obtain a single cash register/POS terminal device free of charge. With assistance from the Migration Service Committee of the Ministry of Internal Affairs, the Ministry of Justice, and RSP IPC, the option of registering and deregistering residence was also introduced.

== Management ==
The chairman of the board is Mikhail Lomtadze.

Kaspi.kz shareholders are Vyacheslav Kim (23.35%), Mikhail Lomtadze (24.55%) and Baring Vostok Capital Partners (28.8%). A further 20.18% is held by public investors and 3.12% by management.

== IPO ==
The IPO took place in October 2020 and was recognized as the second largest in size and fourth overall in Europe in 2020. The initial offering price was set at $33.75 per global depository receipt (GDR).

The total size of the offering ranged from $742 million to $879 million, and the company ended up selling $1 billion worth of its stock with an implied market capitalization of $6.5 billion. After that, the company's capitalization exceeded $20 billion, making Kaspi.kz the most expensive public Kazakhstani company.

On 19 October 2023, Kaspi.kz applied to list American depositary receipts (ADRs) on the NASDAQ exchange in New York. On 19 January 2024, the company sold over 11 million shares on the NASDAQ exchange, raising over $1 billion. Kaspi.kz's IPO became the largest in the US since October the previous year and one of the first in 2024.
