= Zhanat Suleimenov =

Kazakh military leader and politician (1962–2022)

Deputy Minister of Internal Affairs
- In office December 2017 – April 2019
- Preceded by: Amantai Aubakirov
- Succeeded by: Marat Kozhaev

Personal details
- Born: Zhanat Kuanyshevich Suleimenov; 22 July 1962 Kenzharyk, Karaganda Oblast, Kazakh SSR, Soviet Union
- Died: 10 January 2022 (aged 59) Jambyl Region, Kazakhstan

Zhanat Kuanyshevich Suleimenov (Kazakh: Жанат Қуанышұлы Сүлейменов, romanized: Janat Quanyşūly Süleimenov; 22 July 1962 – 10 January 2022) was a Kazakh military leader and politician. He served as Deputy Minister of Internal Affairs from 2017 to 2019. He committed suicide on 10 January 2022, at the age of 59, after a criminal case was opened against him during the 2022 Kazakh protests. He and many Kazakh politicians have been accused of treason during the unrest, including the former head of Kazakhstan's national security committee, Karim Masimov.
