= Mikheil Lomtadze =

Kazakhstan-based businessman

- მიხეილ ლომთაძე
- Born: October 17, 1975 (age 50); Batumi, Georgia
- Education: Harvard Business School
- Occupation: Businessman
- Awards: Order of Kurmet

Mikheil Lomtadze (Georgian: მიხეილ ლომთაძე, romanized: mikheil lomtadze) is a Georgian-Kazakhstani technology entrepreneur and businessman. He is the chairman of the board of Kazakhstan-based fintech Kaspi, and has been a board member and investor of a number of other companies.

== Education and early career ==
Lomtadze obtained his BBA degree from the European School of Management, Georgia in 1997, and Master of Business Administration (MBA) degree from Harvard Business School in 2002.

== Career ==
In 1995, Lomtadze founded Georgia Consulting Group Audit. The company provided auditing and consulting services. In 2002, Lomtadze sold the firm, which became part of Ernst & Young's global network. He then embarked on a career at private equity fund Baring Vostok Capital Partners, first as a project manager, and later as a partner.

In 2006, Mikhail Lomtadze became a member of the board of directors of Kazakhstan's Caspian Bank, and, a year later, became chairman of the bank's board. In 2011, Lomtadze rebranded the bank as Kaspi.

Between 2006 and 2010 he was a member of the board of the Russian Center for Financial Technologies.

In February 2013, Lomtadze and Vyacheslav Kim acquired the merged company Kolesa, Krysha, Market for $15 million, and Lomtadze became chairman of its supervisory board.

In 2017, he invested more than 1 billion rubles in Automama.ru, a retail network for used cars.

In 2021, Lomtadze ranked third in the list of the 50 Richest Businessmen in Kazakhstan according to Forbes Kazakhstan and second among Georgian billionaires on Forbes' The World's Billionaires list.

In 2024, Lomtadze became a board member and partner of the English professional association football club Wycombe Wanderers In the same year, he acquired the club, buying 90% of its shares.

In November 2025, Lomtadze became the owner of Kazakhstan Premier League Side FK Zhenis.
