= Minimum wage in Kazakhstan =

The minimum wage in Kazakhstan is set by a law that established the nationwide minimum wage. According to Kazakh sources, minimum wage in Kazakhstan in 2010 was 14,592 tenge per month. After that it increased to 21,364 tenge in 2015. The minimum Wage in Kazakhstan increased to 42,500 KZT per month in 2019 to 70,000 KZT per month in 2023 and to 85,000 KZT in 2024.
