= Vyacheslav Kim =

Kazakh businessman

Vyacheslav Kim Вячеслав Ким
- Born: June 12, 1969 (age 57); Almaty, Kazakhstan
- Occupations: economist, financier, patron
- Spouse: Tatyana Kim

Vyacheslav Kim (born June 12, 1969) is a Kazakhstani economist, financier, cofounder, shareholder and chairman of the Board of Directors at Kaspi.kz and President of the Kazakhstan National Taekwondo Federation.

As of 2024, Kim is the wealthiest person in Kazakhstan.

== Education ==
In 1996, Kim graduated from the Republican Physics and Mathematics School. He graduated from the Abai Kazakh National Pedagogical University with a degree in Financial Economics in 1998 and from the Russian-Kazakh Modern Humanitarian University with a degree in Finance in 2002.

== Early career ==
1987–1989: Vyacheslav Kim completed his military service in the USSR Armed Forces.

1990: Kim co-founded Konovalov's Ophthalmology Clinic in partnership with his colleague.

1996–2004 – He engaged in retail business and electronic equipment distribution through companies such as ALTAIR JSC, Asia Technics LLP, and ATG LLP.

1993–2005 – Kim was one of the founders and owners of the country’s largest retail chain, Planet of Electronics Network of Stores.

2003–2004 – He served as Chairman of the Supervisory Board of the Kazakhstan Association of Manufacturers and Equipment.

2004–2005 – Kim held the position of President at Asia Technics Group JSC.

2004–2006 – He was an adviser to the Minister of Economy and Budget Planning of the Republic of Kazakhstan.

2005–2006 – Kim was the Managing Director of Economics at Kazakhstan Temir Zholy JSC.

== Kaspi.kz ==
In 1993, Vyacheslav Kim opened the Planet of Electronics Store, which became the country's largest store in less than a decade, but Kim wanted more: he knew that sales could be increased by giving loans to people. After the USSR collapsed, Kazakhstan was going through difficult times: per capita GDP was contracting from 1990 until 2000. Stores could not give their own loans, so they began to buy banking organizations. In 2002, Vyacheslav Kim made a deal with the newly privatized local Bank Kaspiyskiy. However, it was not so easy to combine trade and lending. The entrepreneur began seeking investment partners who might help him, and learned about the Baring Vostok Fund, which acquired a stake in the company. This led to Mikheil Lomtadze joining the management team in 2007, who together with Vyacheslav Kim transformed Kaspi to the biggest Kazakhstan fintech company.

The value of his stake in Kaspi.kz after successful Kaspi.kz IPO on the London Stock Exchange in October 2020 was estimated by Bloomberg at $1.9 billion.

On February 21, 2020, president of Kazakhstan Kassym-Jomart Tokayev held a meeting with Vyacheslav Kim and Chairman of the Kaspi.kz Board Mikhail Lomtadze, at which discussions addressed the digital service development strategy, prospects for e-commerce growth in Kazakhstan and the Company’s plans to support small and medium-sized businesses. The President emphasized the importance of using technological innovations in Kaspi.kz activities. One year later, on February 26, 2021, President of Kazakhstan Kassym-Jomart Tokayev held a second meeting with the Kaspi.kz founders Vyacheslav Kim and Mikheil Lomtadze during which promising areas of joint activity of the state bodies and Kaspi.kz were identified, including in the development of non-cash payments in Kazakhstan. The next meeting took place on May 31, 2022, at which the president discussed the promising plans of Kaspi.kz fintech company development. In the next meeting held on January 25, 2024 the President congratulated Kaspi.kz cofounders with their successful IPO at NASDAQ. Their discussions covered prospects and opportunities for enhancing the country's economic situation along with strategies for attracting new investors from across the globe to Kazakhstan.

== Other projects ==
A co-owner of Kolesa Group since 2013.

A co-owner of the Alseco Company since 2015.

2016–2019 – a member of the Board of Directors and Independent Director of Group of Companies Allur JSC.

2017–2019 – a co-owner of the Magnum Retail Chain.

The chairman of the Supervisory Board of the Magnum Retail Chain since 2019.

In 2021-2022 – Independent Director on the Board of Directors of National Welfare Fund "Samruk-Kazyna" JSC".

In May 2025, he invested one billion US dollars in the development of the Alatau City project in the Almaty region.

In July 2025, Vyacheslav Kim acquired 100% of the shares of Alatau City Bank

== Wealth ==
Since 2002, Vyacheslav Kim has been at the top of the list of the richest people in Kazakhstan being annually published by Forbes Kazakhstan. He moved up from No. 24 position in 2012 to No. 2 position in 2021, with the wealth estimated at $4.2 billion. In 2021, he took the number 5 spot among the most influential businessmen of Kazakhstan and entered the global list of billionaires, rated 925th

== Social activity ==
=== Support for Public and Sports Organizations ===
2016–2019 – President of the Kazakhstan Kendo and Iaido Federation.

November 11, 2013 – President of the Kazakhstan Taekwondo Federation. During leadership of the Taekwondo Federation by Vyacheslav Kim, the Federation started receiving funding, athletes were provided with everything they needed: uniforms, sports gears and equipment. The coaches’ team added specialists from the countries traditionally showing good results in this sport.

A member of the Board of Trustees of the Fizmat Endowment Fund Public Foundation since April 13, 2017, a member of the board of directors of the republican school of Physics and Mathematics.

In 2018, he became a member of the Board of Trustees of the Almaty Triathlon Federation.

A member of the Board of Trustees of the Kazakhstan National Geographic Society since 2019.

=== Charity ===
2010–2014 – sponsored the Ayala Charitable Foundation in the «Breathe, Baby» Project.

A member of the Board of Trustees of the Mercy Voluntary Society since 2016. In March 2017, Vyacheslav Kim together with Mikheil Lomtadze donated an extensively repaired building with an area of 1,400 square meters to the «We will Win Autism» Project

One of the trustees and partners of the Saby Charitable Foundation in the «Build Your Business» Project since 2013

In 2020, Kaspi.kz founders Vyacheslav Kim and Mikheil Lomtadze actively participated in the fight against the coronavirus pandemicproviding financial support to the health care sector of the Republic of Kazakhstan, allocating 100 million tenge for the purchase of rapid tests and artificial ventilators and donated 100 ambulances to the State to fight the pandemic.

In January 2022, founders of Kaspi.kz Vyacheslav Kim and Mikheil Lomtadze allocated 579 million tenge to support small business entities that had suffered during riots in Almaty. They transferred 10 billion tenge to the Fund "For the People of Kazakhstan" involved in solving the issues associated with healthcare, education, social support, as well as culture and sports.

== Awards ==
- The Order of Kurmet (December 14, 2007) – for merits in the development of the economy, social sector and active public work.
- The Order of Parasat (December 13, 2016)– for significant contribution to the socio-economic development of the Republic of Kazakhstan.
- «Enbegi Ushin» Badge and the title «A Citizen of Honour» Almaty (September 15, 2019) – for special contribution to development of the city.
- In 2020, for the first time in its history, the editorial board of Forbes Kazakhstan magazine announced two winners of the Businessman of the Year award – Vyacheslav Kim, the founder of Kaspi.kz, and Mikheil Lomtadze, the Chairman of the Management Board of the company.
- The Order of Barys II class (December 13, 2021) - for his significant contribution to the socio-economic and cultural development of the Republic of Kazakhstan
