= Permanent Mission of Kazakhstan to the United Nations =

Permanent Mission of the Republic of Kazakhstan to the United Nations
- Қазақстан Республикасының БҰҰ жанындағы Тұрақты өкілдігі (Kazakh); Постоянное представительство Республики Казахстан при ООН (Russian)
- Location: New York City, United States
- Address: 305 East 47th Street, 3rd Floor, New York, NY 10017
- Coordinates: 40°45′10.1″N 73°58′8.8″W
- Opened: 1992
- Jurisdiction: Republic of Kazakhstan to the United Nations
- Permanent representative: Kairat Umarov
- Website: gov.kz

The Permanent Mission of the Republic of Kazakhstan to the United Nations (Note: Kazakh: Қазақстан Республикасының БҰҰ жанындағы Тұрақты өкілдігі; Qazaqstan Respublikasynyñ BŪŪ janyndağy Tūraqty ökıldıgı; Russian: Постоянное представительство Республики Казахстан при ООН; Postoyannoye predstavitelstvo Respubliki Kazakhstan pri OON) is a diplomatic mission of Kazakhstan to the United Nations Headquarters in New York City. The mission serves as the principal institution responsible for articulating Kazakhstan's positions within the UN system, coordinating multilateral diplomacy, and overseeing the country's participation across the UN's programs, committees, and specialized agencies.

Kazakhstan formally established its Permanent Mission on 5 June 1992, three months after becoming a UN member state on 2 March 1992. The mission is currently headed by Kairat Umarov since June 2024.

== History ==
Kazakhstan submitted its application for membership in the United Nations on 31 December 1991, shortly after the dissolution of the Soviet Union. The United Nations Security Council recommended the admission of the Republic of Kazakhstan on 23 January 1992, and the 46th session of the General Assembly unanimously approved Kazakhstan's 168th UN membership on 2 March 1992. President Nursultan Nazarbayev appointed Akmaral Arystanbekova as the first permanent representative on 15 April 1992. The Permanent Mission of the Republic of Kazakhstan to the United Nations was formally established on 5 June 1992 in New York City, pursuant to Presidential Decree No. 795 "On Opening of the Permanent Mission of the Republic of Kazakhstan to the United Nations", becoming one of the first fully functioning diplomatic institutions created by the newly independent Republic of Kazakhstan.

Since its establishment, the Permanent Mission has represented Kazakhstan's key priorities in the United Nations, including nuclear disarmament, regional peace and security, and sustainable development. Kazakhstan has advanced a number of significant initiatives, such as the International Day against Nuclear Tests, the Central Asian Nuclear Weapon Free Zone, and the Universal Declaration on Achieving a World Free of Nuclear Weapons. The Mission also promotes Kazakhstan's contributions to international peace efforts, including the Conference on Interaction and Confidence-Building Measures in Asia (CICA) process, support for the UN-led Syria negotiations, and humanitarian assistance to Afghanistan. It coordinated Kazakhstan's activities during its 2017–2018 term as a non-permanent member of the Security Council and supported proposals such as the establishment of an International Agency for Biological Safety. In cooperation with 27 UN agencies operating in Kazakhstan, the Mission facilitates programs in social development, environmental protection, and economic modernization, including major UN-backed initiatives in the Aral Sea region.

== Leadership ==
The Permanent Mission of the Republic of Kazakhstan to the United Nations is led by the Permanent Representative (Ambassador) to the UN, who serves as the chief diplomat and official spokesperson for Kazakhstan in all matters before the UN. The Ambassador is appointed by the President of Kazakhstan and represents the country in the General Assembly, Security Council (when relevant), and other UN bodies.

Supporting the Ambassador is the deputy permanent representative, responsible for assisting in diplomatic negotiations, supervising key committees, and coordinating the Mission's activities across specialized areas.

The Mission also includes Counsellors and Senior Counsellors, each entrusted with specific portfolios such as political affairs, economic cooperation, human rights, or regional security. These officials may lead delegations or participate in UN meetings on behalf of Kazakhstan.

Administrative and operational functions are managed by the Minister-Counsellor for Administration, attachés, and technical staff, who ensure the Mission's effective functioning, including logistics, protocol, communication, and coordination with UN agencies based in New York and Kazakhstan.

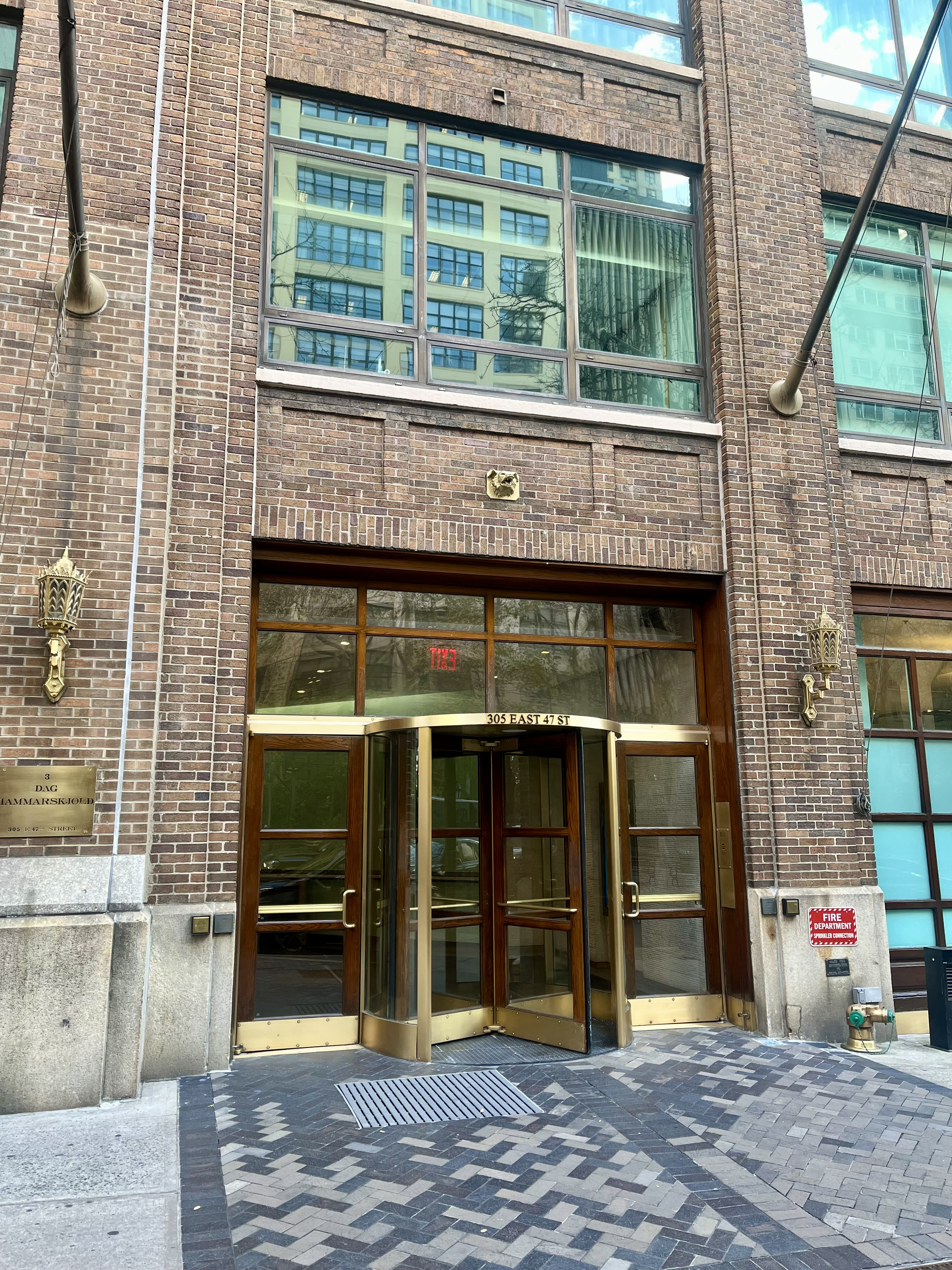
The entrance to 305 East 47th Street

Since the opening of the Mission in 1992, the position of permanent representative has been held by following diplomats:

- Akmaral Arystanbekova (1992–1999)
- Madina Jarbussynova (1999–2003)
- Erzhan Kazykhanov (2003–2007)
- Byrganym Aitimova (2007–2013)
- Kairat Abdrakhmanov (2013–2016)
- Kairat Umarov (2017–2020)
- Magzhan Ilyassov (2020–2022)
- Akan Rakhmetullin (2022–2024)
- Kairat Umarov (since 2024)

== Headquarters ==
The Permanent Mission of the Republic of Kazakhstan to the United Nations is located in New York City, in close proximity to the Headquarters of the United Nations. The Mission occupies offices at 305 East 47th Street, within the United Nations diplomatic district in Midtown Manhattan, where Kazakhstan's Permanent Representative and diplomatic staff conduct their work. The building houses Kazakhstan's core diplomatic functions to the UN, including political, economic, humanitarian, and administrative sections, and serves as the main venue for official meetings, briefings, and coordination with other member states and UN bodies.

== See also ==
- Kazakhstan and the United Nations
- Permanent Representative of Kazakhstan to the United Nations
- List of diplomatic missions of Kazakhstan
- Kazakh Ministry of Foreign Affairs
