= Ministers of Foreign Affairs (Kazakhstan) =

The Minister of Foreign Affairs of the Republic of Kazakhstan (Kazakh: Қазақстан Республикасының Сыртқы істер министрі, Qazaqstan Respublikasynyñ Syrtqy ıster ministrı; Russian. Министр иностранных дел Республики Казахстан) is an official in the Government of the Republic of Kazakhstan, responsible for ensuring the implementation of foreign policy. He/She heads the Ministry of Foreign Affairs. The President of the Republic of Kazakhstan can independently appoint and dismiss the minister without consulting the Parliament.

The current foreign minister of Kazakhstan is Mukhtar Tileuberdi.

== Functions ==
The Minister of Foreign Affairs of the Republic of Kazakhstan operates relying on the Regulation on the Ministry of Foreign Affairs of the Republic of Kazakhstan approved by the Decree of the Government of the Republic of Kazakhstan No. 1118, dated October 28, 2004. The Minister is authorized to represent the Republic of Kazakhstan in relations with foreign states and international organizations within its competence, represents the Ministry in state bodies and other organizations. He also determines the duties and powers of deputies, appoints to positions and dismisses, promotes and imposes disciplinary penalties on the staff of the diplomatic service, determines the need for personnel of diplomatic service bodies, exercises other powers in accordance with the legislation of the Republic of Kazakhstan.

== History ==
The position of the head of a foreign affairs office on Kazakh territory was first documented during the period of existence of the Turkestan Autonomous Soviet Socialist Republic, which was created in the initial period after the October Revolution of 1917. This position was called the People's Commissar for Foreign Affairs of the Turkestan ASSR, whose activities were regulated by the Regulations on the Commissariat of Foreign Affairs of the Turkestan Republic in the Russian Federation. The functional duties of the People's Commissar for Foreign Affairs of the Turkestan ASSR included political relations with foreign governments, patronage in foreign lands to trade and the interests of the republic, an application for the lawful protection of the citizens of the republic abroad. The position of the Minister for Foreign Affairs in the modern sense appeared in February 1944 after the adoption of the USSR Law «On Submission of Powers to the Union Republics in the Field of Foreign Relations and on the Transformation of the People's Commissariat of Foreign Affairs from the All-Union into Union-Republic People’s Commissariat». By then, all of the Union republics of the USSE gained the right to enter into direct relations with foreign states, with the Minister of Foreign Affairs of the USSR performing all of the main foreign policy functions. Between 1944–1974, the office also concurrently served as the office of the Deputy Chairmen of the Council of Ministers of the Kazakh SSR. The position of Kazakhstan's foreign minister in its current form was established in 1991 after the Kazakh SSR changed its name to the Republic of Kazakhstan and gained its independence from the Soviet Union.

== List of ministers ==
This is a list of the ministers of foreign affairs of Kazakhstan.

Name	Position	Begin	End
Tölegen Täjıbaev	People's Commissar for Foreign Affairs	1944	1946
Tölegen Täjıbaev	Minister of Foreign Affairs of the Kazakh SSR	1946	1953
Qaiyrğali Baiğaliev	Minister of Foreign Affairs of the Kazakh SSR	1953	1955
Tölegen Täjıbaev	Minister of Foreign Affairs of the Kazakh SSR	1955	1958
Asqar Zakarin	Deputy Chairmen of the Council of Ministers - Minister of Foreign Affairs of the Kazakh SSR	1958	1961
Öteşqali Atambaev	Deputy Chairmen of the Council of Ministers - Minister of Foreign Affairs of the Kazakh SSR	1961	1963
Ädi Şärıpov	Deputy Chairmen of the Council of Ministers - Minister of Foreign Affairs of the Kazakh SSR	1963	1966
Baljan Böltırıkova	Deputy Chairmen of the Council of Ministers - Minister of Foreign Affairs of the Kazakh SSR	1966	1971
Mälık Fazylov	Minister of Foreign Affairs of the Kazakh SSR	1973	1976
Müsılım Bazarbaev	Minister of Foreign Affairs of the Kazakh SSR	1976	1981
Mihail İsinaliev	Minister of Foreign Affairs of the Kazakh SSR	1981	1989
Aqmaral Arystanbekova	Minister of Foreign Affairs of the Kazakh SSR	1989	December 1991
Töleutai Süleimenov	Minister of Foreign Affairs of the Republic of Kazakhstan	December 1991	1994
Qanat Saudabaev	Minister of Foreign Affairs of the Republic of Kazakhstan	1994	1994
Qasym-Jomart Toqaev	Minister of Foreign Affairs of the Republic of Kazakhstan	1994	1999
Erlan Ydyrysov	Minister of Foreign Affairs of the Republic of Kazakhstan	1999	2002
Qasym-Jomart Toqaev	Minister of Foreign Affairs of the Republic of Kazakhstan	June 2003	January 2007
Marat Täjin	Minister of Foreign Affairs of the Republic of Kazakhstan	January 11, 2007	September 4, 2009
Qanat Saudabaev	Minister of Foreign Affairs of the Republic of Kazakhstan	September 4, 2009	April 11, 2011
Erjan Qazyhanov	Minister of Foreign Affairs of the Republic of Kazakhstan	April 11, 2011	September 24, 2012
Erlan Ydyrysov	Minister of Foreign Affairs of the Republic of Kazakhstan	September 28, 2012	December 28, 2016
Qairat Äbdırahmanov	Minister of Foreign Affairs of the Republic of Kazakhstan	December 28, 2016	December 26, 2018
Beibıt Atamqūlov	Minister of Foreign Affairs of the Republic of Kazakhstan	December 26, 2018	September 18, 2019
Mukhtar Tleuberdi	Minister of Foreign Affairs of the Republic of Kazakhstan	September 18, 2019	March 29, 2023
Murat Nurtleu	Minister of Foreign Affairs of the Republic of Kazakhstan	April 3, 2023	26 September, 2025
Ermek Köşerbaev	Minister of Foreign Affairs of the Republic of Kazakhstan	26 September, 2025	Present
