= Permanent Representative of Kazakhstan to the United Nations =

Kazakhstan's chief diplomat at the United Nations

Permanent Representative of the Republic of Kazakhstan to the United Nations
- Emblem of Kazakhstan

- Flag of Kazakhstan

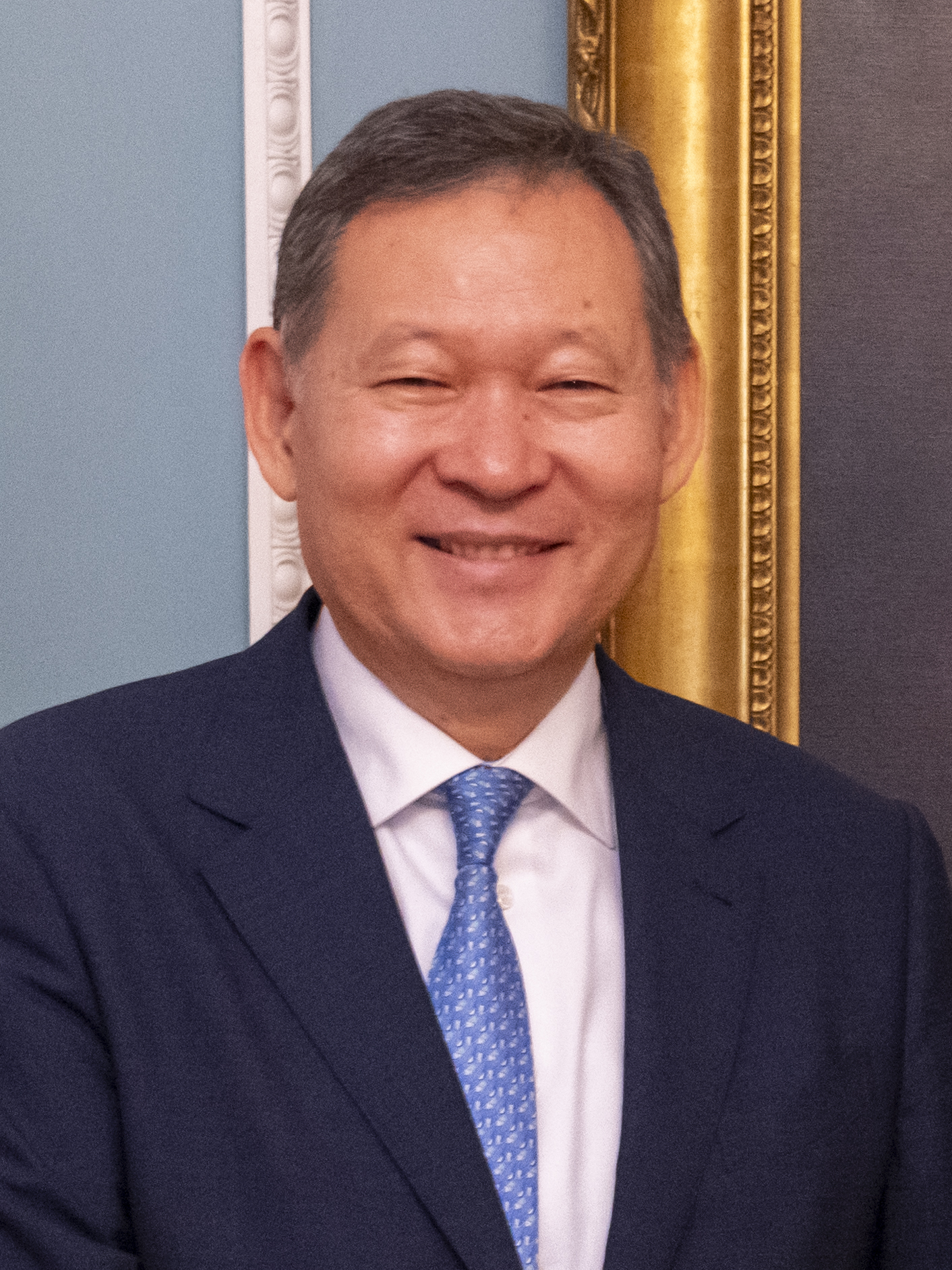
- Incumbent; Kairat Umarov since 19 June 2024
- Ministry of Foreign Affairs; Permanent Mission of Kazakhstan to the United Nations
- Style: His or Her Excellency (formal); Mr. or Madam Ambassador (informal)
- Type: Ambassador Extraordinary and Plenipotentiary; Permanent Representative
- Reports to: Ministry of Foreign Affairs
- Seat: United Nations Headquarters; New York City, New York, USA
- Appointer: President of Kazakhstan
- Term length: No fixed term; serves at the pleasure of the President
- Formation: 1992
- First holder: Akmaral Arystanbekova
- Deputy: Deputy Permanent Representative
- Website: www.un.int/kazakhstan

The permanent representative of the Republic of Kazakhstan to the United Nations serves as Kazakhstan's chief diplomat at the United Nations. This person leads Kazakhstan's diplomatic mission in New York, engages in the work of the United Nations Security Council (when relevant), and delivers the country's positions in the United Nations General Assembly and other UN forums.

The Permanent Representative is appointed by the President of Kazakhstan, normally upon recommendation by the Ministry of Foreign Affairs. As a senior diplomatic post, the role involves advocating for Kazakhstan's foreign policy priorities at the United Nations.

Since September 2025, Erzhan Kazykhanov has held this position. Before his appointment, he was Assistant to the President of the Republic of Kazakhstan for International Affairs and has a long history of service in Kazakhstan's multilateral diplomacy.

== History ==
The Republic of Kazakhstan became a 168th member of the United Nations on 2 March 1992, shortly after its independence. Soon after, Kazakhstan established a Permanent Mission in New York to represent its interests at the United Nations. On 15 April 1992, Akmaral Arystanbekova was appointed as Kazakhstan's first Permanent Representative to the United Nations under Presidential Decree No. 718, becoming the fourth woman ambassador among the 176 UN member states at that time.

Under Article 9 of Law No. 299 "On Diplomatic Service of the Republic of Kazakhstan" (7 March 2002), the President of Kazakhstan appoints and dismisses the Permanent Representative of the Republic of Kazakhstan to the United Nations, who holds the rank of extraordinary and plenipotentiary ambassador. If the charter of the United Nations or another international organization requires a different procedure, the appointment may not be considered a political civil service position. The Presidential Decree No. 1287 of 4 February 2004, "On the Approval of the Regulation on Diplomatic and Equivalent Representative Offices of the Republic of Kazakhstan", further establishes the legal framework for Kazakhstan's diplomatic and permanent representative missions abroad, recognizing them as equivalent in status to embassies.

The Permanent Representative serves as the chief diplomat of Kazakhstan at the United Nations, representing the country in the General Assembly, participating in Security Council work when applicable, and engaging with other UN bodies.

== List of permanent representatives ==
#	Photo	Name	Term of office			U.N. Secretary-General	President
#	Photo	Name	Date appointed	Date presented credentials	Date until	U.N. Secretary-General	President
1		Akmaral Arystanbekova (born 1948)	15 April 1992	19 June 1992	27 November 1999	(Egypt) Boutros Boutros-Ghali	Nursultan Nazarbayev
1		Akmaral Arystanbekova (born 1948)	15 April 1992	19 June 1992	27 November 1999	(Ghana) Kofi Annan	Nursultan Nazarbayev
2		Madina Jarbussynova (born 1954)	27 November 1999	22 December 1999	6 May 2003	(Ghana) Kofi Annan	Nursultan Nazarbayev
3		Erzhan Kazykhanov (born 1964)	6 May 2003	12 June 2003	9 February 2007	(Ghana) Kofi Annan	Nursultan Nazarbayev
3		Erzhan Kazykhanov (born 1964)	6 May 2003	12 June 2003	9 February 2007	(South Korea) Ban Ki-moon	Nursultan Nazarbayev
4		Byrganym Aitimova (born 1953)	9 February 2007	16 March 2007	26 August 2013	(South Korea) Ban Ki-moon	Nursultan Nazarbayev
5		Kairat Abdrakhmanov (born 1964)	26 November 2013	9 January 2014	28 December 2016	(South Korea) Ban Ki-moon	Nursultan Nazarbayev
6		Kairat Umarov (born 1963)	4 January 2017	9 January 2017	30 September 2020	(Portugal) António Guterres	Nursultan Nazarbayev
6		Kairat Umarov (born 1963)	4 January 2017	9 January 2017	30 September 2020	(Portugal) António Guterres	Kassym-Jomart Tokayev
7		Magzhan Ilyassov (born 1973)	30 September 2020	26 October 2020	6 October 2022	(Portugal) António Guterres	Kassym-Jomart Tokayev
8		Akan Rakhmetullin (born 1967)	6 October 2022	26 October 2022	16 May 2024	(Portugal) António Guterres	Kassym-Jomart Tokayev
9		Kairat Umarov (born 1963)	16 May 2024	19 June 2024	Incumbent	(Portugal) António Guterres	Kassym-Jomart Tokayev
