= List of ambassadors of Kazakhstan to the United States =

Coordinates: 38.908611°N 77.036111°W

Ambassador of Kazakhstan to the United States Embassy of Kazakhstan in Washington, D.C.
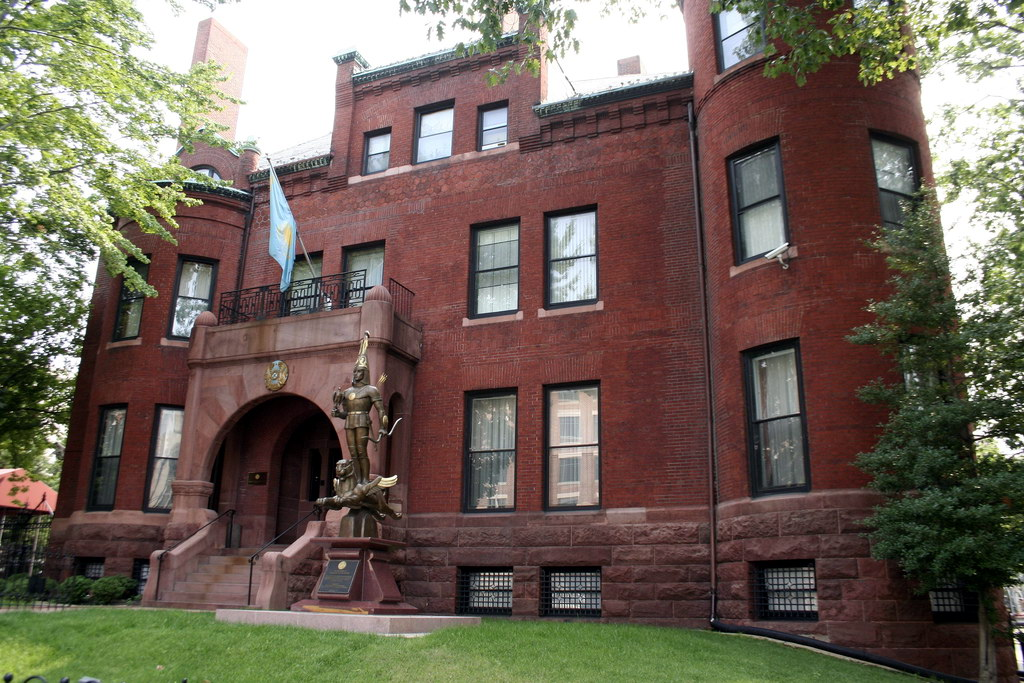
- Incumbent; Kairat Umarov since January 9, 2013
- Inaugural holder: Alim Zhamburshin
- Formation: November 9, 1992

The Kazakh ambassador in Washington, D. C. is the official representative of the Government in Astana to the Government of the United States and is concurrently accredited in Brasília.

== List of representatives ==
Following is the list of the representatives of Kazakhstan to the United States.

Diplomatic agrément	Diplomatic accreditation	Ambassador	Observations	Prime Minister of Kazakhstan	List of presidents of the United States	Term end
November 1, 1991			– diplomatic relations established between the United States and the Republic of Kazakhstan	Sergey Tereshchenko	George H. W. Bush	
November 9, 1992	November 19, 1992	Alim Zhamburshin		Sergey Tereshchenko	George H. W. Bush	
August 11, 1994		Tuleutai Suleimenov		Akezhan Kazhegeldin	Bill Clinton	
March 19, 1996	April 30, 1996	Bolat Nurgaliyev		Akezhan Kazhegeldin	Bill Clinton	
January 1, 2001	February 14, 2001	Kanat Saudabayev	arrived Dec. 23 carrying credentials addressed to President Bush. We were unable to process him until such time as new president was sworn in.	Kassym-Jomart Tokayev	George W. Bush	
July 16, 2007	July 25, 2007	Erlan Idrissov		Karim Massimov	George W. Bush	
January 9, 2013	January 14, 2013	Kairat Umarov		Serik Akhmetov	Barack Obama	
January 9, 2017	March 14, 2021	Erzhan Kazykhanov			Donald Trump	
April 1, 2021	October 22, 2025	Yerzhan Ashikbayev			Joe Biden	
October 22, 2025		Magzhan Ilyassov		Oljas Bektenov	Joe Biden; Donald Trump	

== See also ==
- Kazakhstan–United States relations
- List of ambassadors of the United States to Kazakhstan
