= Mohamad Asruchin =

Indonesian diplomat (born 1953)

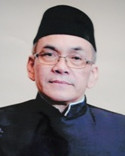

Ambassador of Indonesia to Uzbekistan, Kazakhstan, Kyrgyzstan, and Tajikistan
- In office 20 January 2010 – November 2014
- Preceded by: Sjahril Sabaruddin
- Succeeded by: Anak Agung Gde Alit Santhika

Personal details
- Born: 5 August 1953 (age 73) Bojonegoro, East Java, Indonesia
- Party: Democratic Party
- Spouse: Etty Nurjayawanti
- Education: University of Indonesia (Drs.); University of Washington (MA)

Mohamad Asruchin (born 5 August 1953) is an Indonesian lecturer and diplomat who last served as ambassador to Uzbekistan, concurrently accredited to Kazakhstan, Kyrgyzstan, and Tajikistan, from 2010 to 2014.

== Early life and education ==
Mohamad Asruchin was born in Bojonegoro on 5 August 1953. He studied sinology at the University of Indonesia and graduated with a bachelor's degree in 1979. He later pursued graduate studies in the United States, obtaining a master of arts degree in sinology from the University of Washington School of International Studies, Seattle, in 1985.

== Diplomatic career ==
Asruchin began his foreign service career in 1981, completing basic diplomatic school in 1982. His early postings included several head of section roles within the Asia Pacific and Africa directorate, serving as chief of the North Asia II section (1982–1983) and chief of Southeast Asia I section (1985–1986).

In December 1986, fifteen months after he received his master degrees, Asruchin was sent to the consulate general in Hong Kong, in line with his field of studies. He staffed the consulate general's political section, which was the only consulate general with such section. His superior instructed him to observe and report developments in China through Hong Kong. In mid-1988, with permit from the foreign department, Asruchin and the political section chief Anak Agung Gde Raka, met with Chinese diplomats disguised as news reporters from Xinhua News Agency, as preparations to re-establish diplomatic relations, which was severed decades ago. At that time, due to a lack of diplomatic relations, Indonesian diplomats were only allowed to engage with their Chinese counterparts through the UN's permanent mission in New York.

Asruchin later replaced Anak Agung as the chief of politics, serving until his recall in 1989. Following a brief stint as the chief of libraries at the foreign department's research and development agency 1989 to 1990, he was sent to Beijing as a member of a team responsible for re-open embassy in the country in November 1990. He was then posted in the embassy as the chief of social, cultural, and information section until 1994. During his tenure, he was responsible for managing the flow of information and mass media during President Suharto's visit to China on 16 November 1990.

Asruchin returned to the foreign department as deputy director (chief of subdirectorate) of South Asia from 1995 to 1998, during which he took up mid-level and senior diplomatic school in 1997. He was the posted overseas as chief of political affairs at the embassy in Islamabad, Pakistan, from 1998 to 2002. He appealed by requesting the foreign ministry's human resource department to post him according to his field of studies, explicitly mentioning Singapore, but the decision remained unchanged. During his tenure, Asruchin was put in charge of the Indonesian Open University in Islamabad. He also coordinated President Abdurrahman Wahid's state visit to Pakistan in June 2000. He also took assignments outside his duties as coordinator and rapporteur for the ASEAN Islamabad Committee (AIC) meeting in September 2000 and chaired the Asian deputy chiefs of mission club in Islamabad from July 2001 to 2002.

Asruchin took on another middle-level role in the foreign department as deputy director (chief of subdirectorate) of Southeast Asia from 2003 to 2004. During his brief stint in the position, he coordinated joint commissions with Thailand in May 2003 and Brunei Darussalam in June 2003, as well as bilateral consultations with Singapore in August 2003. After his brief domestic stint, Asruchin was sent to Afghanistan to led a team for re-opening Indonesia's embassy in Kabul at the end of 2003. Asruchin, who was sent by the foreign department's secretary general, was accompanied by a local staff. He then became the charge d'affaires ad interim of the embassy from January to September 2004. On 31 August 2004, Asruchin became the director of South and Central Asia in the foreign ministry. He was discouraged to learn the lack of importance of his scope of duty compared to his fellow directors, although he initially thought his workload would be much lighter. He was proven wrong later on due to the region's dynamics and demanding issues.

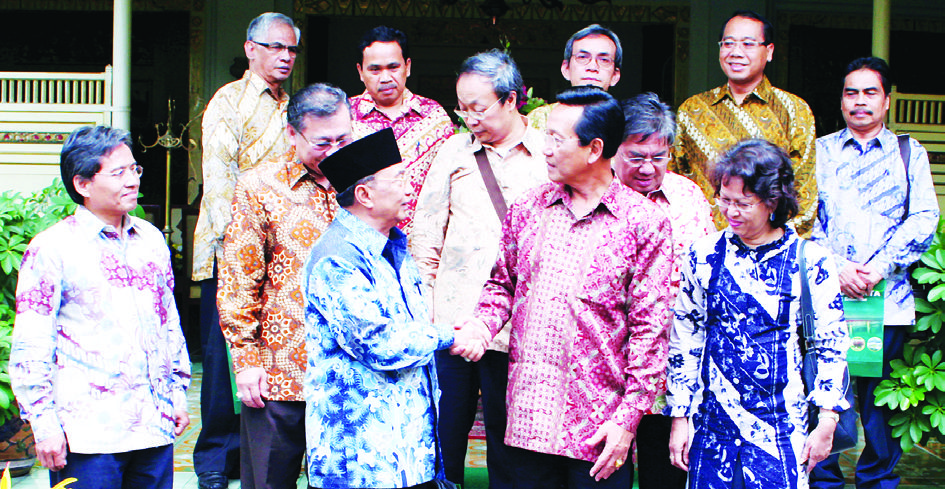
Asruchin (third row, third from right) with other ambassador candidates during a reception by the Governor of Yogyakarta Hamengkubuwono X, 2009.

Asruchin was nominated by president Susilo Bambang Yudhoyono as ambassador to Uzbekistan, with concurrent accreditation to Kazakhstan, Kyrgyzstan, and Tajikistan, in 2009. During his parliamentary assessment on 27 August 2009, one of the parliament members jokingly asked him whether he could find Guruh Sukarnoputra's wife in Uzbekistan. Asruchin was eventually sworn in on 20 January 2010, replacing Sjahril Sabaruddin. He presented his credentials to president Emomali Rahmon of Tajikistan on 20 April 2010, foreign minister Kanat Saudabayev of Kazakhstan on 22 June 2010, president Islam Karimov of Uzbekistan on 6 July 2010, and president Roza Otunbayeva of Kyrgyzstan on 17 November 2010. He was the last non-resident ambassador to Kazakhstan, as in December 2010 Indonesia opened its embassy in Kazakhstan and appointed an ambassador two years later.

== Later life ==
Asruchin served until his replacement by Anak Agung Gde Alit Santhika in November 2014, departing Tashkent on 19 November and arriving in Jakarta on 20 November. He retired from foreign service and shortly after joined the Al-Azhar Indonesia University, where he taught Mandarin and Chinese culture from 2015 to 2019. He also served as deputy chairman of the Centre for Nusantara Strategic Studies (PPSN), specifically overseeing foreign strategic studies. He authored a book titled A Diplomat's Journey Tracing the Silk Road, which provides an in-depth perspective on China's national strategy regarding the Silk Road.

In March 2025, Asruchin was named as a member of the board of experts of the Democratic Party for international relations.

== Personal life ==
Mohamad Asruchin is married to Etty Nurjayawanti.
