= List of ambassadors of Kazakhstan to Turkey =

Ambassador of Kazakhstan to Turkey
- Incumbent; Abzal Saparbekuly since 5 April 2017
- Ministry of Foreign Affairs
- Appointer: President of Kazakhstan
- Inaugural holder: Kanat Saudabayev
- Formation: 17 May 1992

The ambassador extraordinary and plenipotentiary of Kazakhstan to Turkey is the official representative of the president and the government of Kazakhstan to the government of Turkey. The diplomatic relations between the two countries were established shortly after Kazakhstan gained its independence from the Soviet Union on 2 March 1992 while the Kazakh Embassy was opened on 17 May 1992.

== List of ambassadors ==
- Kanat Saudabayev (17 May 1992 – 14 November 1996)
- Baltash Tursumbaev (6 December 1996 – 2 November 1998)
- Kairat Sarybay (8 April 1999 – 29 October 2003)
- Amanjol Jankuliev (19 December 2003 – 6 October 2005)
- Beibit Isabaev (25 April 2005 – 28 February 2008)
- Baghdad Amreyev (12 June 2008 – 7 October 2010)
- Zhanseit Tuymenbayev (7 October 2010 – 7 October 2016)
- Abzal Saparbekuly (5 April 2017 – present)
