= Kairat Abdrakhmanov =

Kazakh diplomat (born 1964)

- Qairat Äbdırahmanov; Қайрат Әбдірахманов
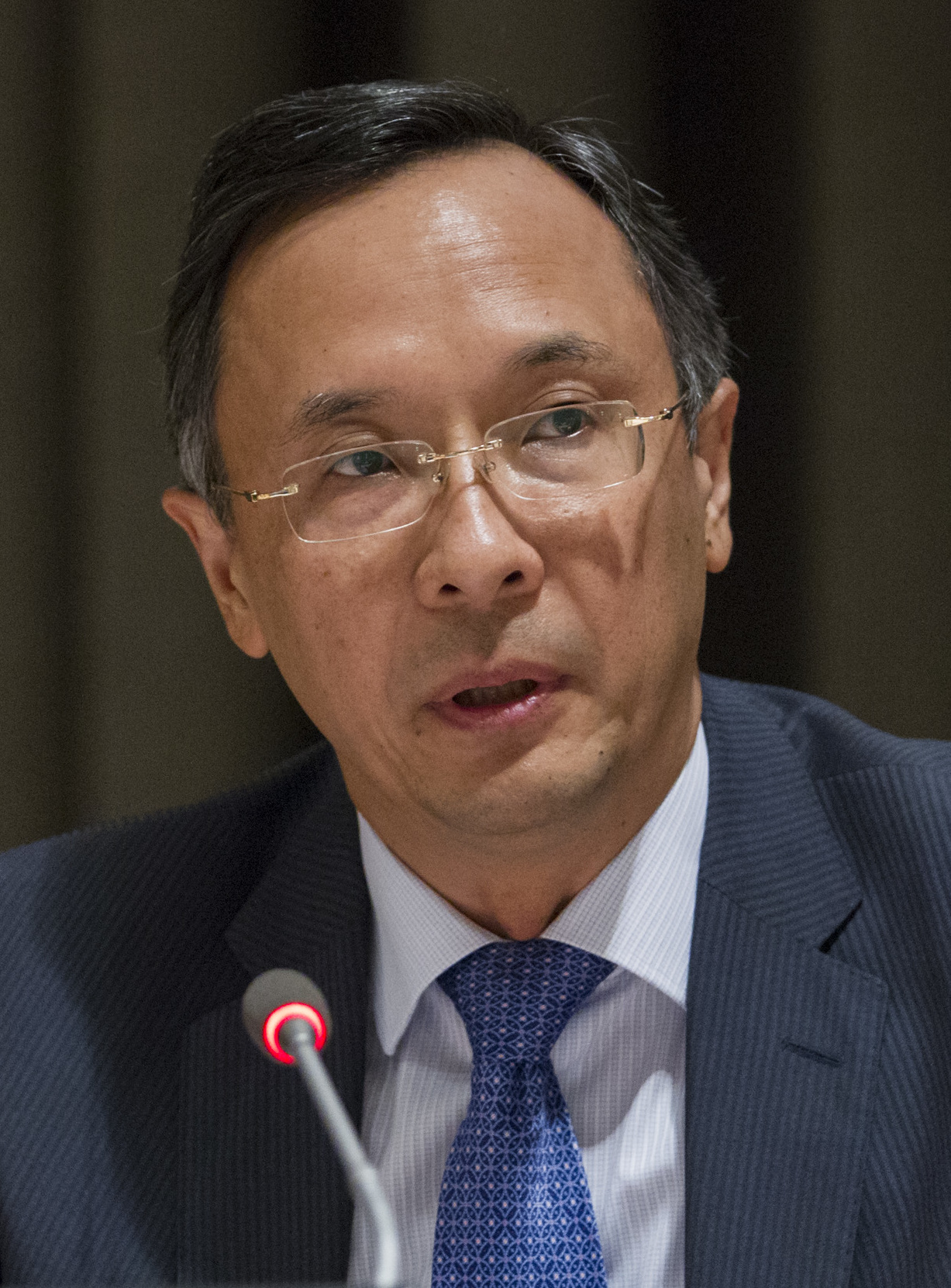
- Abdrakhmanov in 2015

OSCE High Commissioner on National Minorities
- In office 4 December 2020 – 6 September 2024
- Preceded by: Lamberto Zannier
- Succeeded by: Christophe Kamp

Minister of Foreign Affairs
- In office 28 December 2016 – 26 December 2018
- President: Nursultan Nazarbayev
- Prime Minister: Bakhytzhan Sagintayev
- Preceded by: Erlan Idrissov
- Succeeded by: Beibut Atamkulov

Permanent Representative of Kazakhstan to the United Nations
- In office 26 November 2013 – 28 December 2016
- President: Nursultan Nazarbayev
- Preceded by: Byrganym Aitimova
- Succeeded by: Kairat Umarov

Permanent Representative of Kazakhstan to the OSCE
- In office 4 September 2008 – March 2011
- President: Nursultan Nazarbayev
Service as Ambassador
Ambassador of Kazakhstan to Netherlands, Representative to Organisation for the Prohibition of Chemical Weapons
Incumbent
Assumed office 6 September 2024
| President | Kassym-Jomart Tokayev |
| Preceded by | Askar Zhumagaliyev |
Ambassador of Kazakhstan to Sweden and Denmark
In office 18 March 2019 – 7 December 2020
| President | Nursultan Nazarbayev; Kassym-Jomart Tokayev |
| Preceded by | Dastan Yeleukenov |
| Succeeded by | Sergey Nurtaev |
Ambassador of Kazakhstan to Austria and Slovenia
In office March 2011 – 26 November 2013
| President | Nursultan Nazarbayev |
| Preceded by | Erzhan Kazykhanov |
| Succeeded by | Qairat Sarybai |
Ambassador of Kazakhstan to Austria, Representative to international organizations in Vienna
In office 20 August 2007 – 26 December 2008
| President | Nursultan Nazarbayev |
| Preceded by | Rakhat Aliyev |
| Succeeded by | Erzhan Kazykhanov |
Ambassador of Kazakhstan to Israel
In office April 2003 – March 2006
| President | Nursultan Nazarbayev |
- Preceded by: Mukhtar Tleuberdi
- Succeeded by: Talğat Örekenov

Personal details
- Born: 21 April 1964 (age 62) Zharkent, Kazakh SSR, Soviet Union
- Party: Amanat
- Spouse: Mayra Abdirakhmanova
- Children: 2
- Education: Al-Farabi Kazakh National University

Kairat Kudaybergenuly Abdrakhmanov (Kazakh: Қайрат Құдайбергенұлы Әбдірахманов, Qairat Qūdaibergenūly Äbdırahmanov, born 21 April 1964) was the foreign minister for the Republic of Kazakhstan from 28 December 2016 until 26 December 2018. Abdrakhmanov was previously Kazakhstan's permanent representative to the United Nations. Abdrakhmanov was also Kazakhstan's representative to the Organization for Security and Co-operation in Europe (OSCE).

== See also ==
- List of foreign ministers in 2017
- List of current foreign ministers
