= Bolat Nurgaliyev =

Kazakh diplomat (born 1951)

Ambassador of Kazakhstan to Israel and Cyprus
- In office 2012 – September 2014
- Preceded by: Galym Orazbakov
- Succeeded by: Doulat Kuanyshev

Secretary-General of the Shanghai Cooperation Organisation
- In office 1 January 2007 – 31 December 2009
- Preceded by: Zhang Deguang (as Executive Secretary)
- Succeeded by: Muratbek Imanaliyev

Ambassador of Kazakhstan to Japan
- In office 2003–2006
- Preceded by: Yerlan Baudarbek-Kozhataev (as chargé d'affaires ad interim)
- Succeeded by: Dinara Zheldybayeva (as chargée d'affaires ad interim)

Ambassador of Kazakhstan to South Korea
- In office 2001–2003
- Preceded by: Tulegen Zhukeev
- Succeeded by: Darkhan Berdaliev

Ambassador of Kazakhstan to the United States, Canada and Mexico
- In office 1996–2000
- Preceded by: Tuleutai Suleimenov
- Succeeded by: Kanat Saudabayev

Personal details
- Born: 25 July 1951 (age 75) Blagodatnoye, Erkenshilik Raion, Akmolin Oblast, Kazakh SSR, USSR
- Education: Tselinograd State Pedagogical Institute

Bolat Kabdylkhamituly Nurgaliyev (Kazakh: Болат Қабдылхамитұлы Нұрғалиев, Bolat Qabdylhamitūly Nūrğaliev; born July 25, 1951) is a Kazakh diplomat and the current Special Representative of the OSCE Chairperson-in-Office for protracted conflicts.

Nurgaliyev studied foreign languages at the Tselinograd State Pedagogical Institute. He joined the Soviet Foreign Ministry, and served from 1980 to 1992 throughout South Asia. He then was the director of the Department of International Security and Arms Control Department of the Kazakh Foreign Ministry for four years, until he was appointed Ambassador to the United States in 1996. In 2001, he became Kazakhstan's ambassador to South Korea, and in 2003 the ambassador to Japan. He served as Secretary-General of the Shanghai Cooperation Organisation from January 1, 2007 to December 31, 2009. Shortly after taking office, Nurgaliyev commented that "The most important task for the SCO now is to further crackdown on terrorism, separatism and extremism". He was appointed as the Special Representative of the OSCE Chairperson-in-Office for protracted conflicts for the 2010 Kazakhstani Chairmanship of the OSCE.
