= Kanat Saudabayev =

Kazakh diplomat and politician (born 1946)

- Қанат Саудабаев
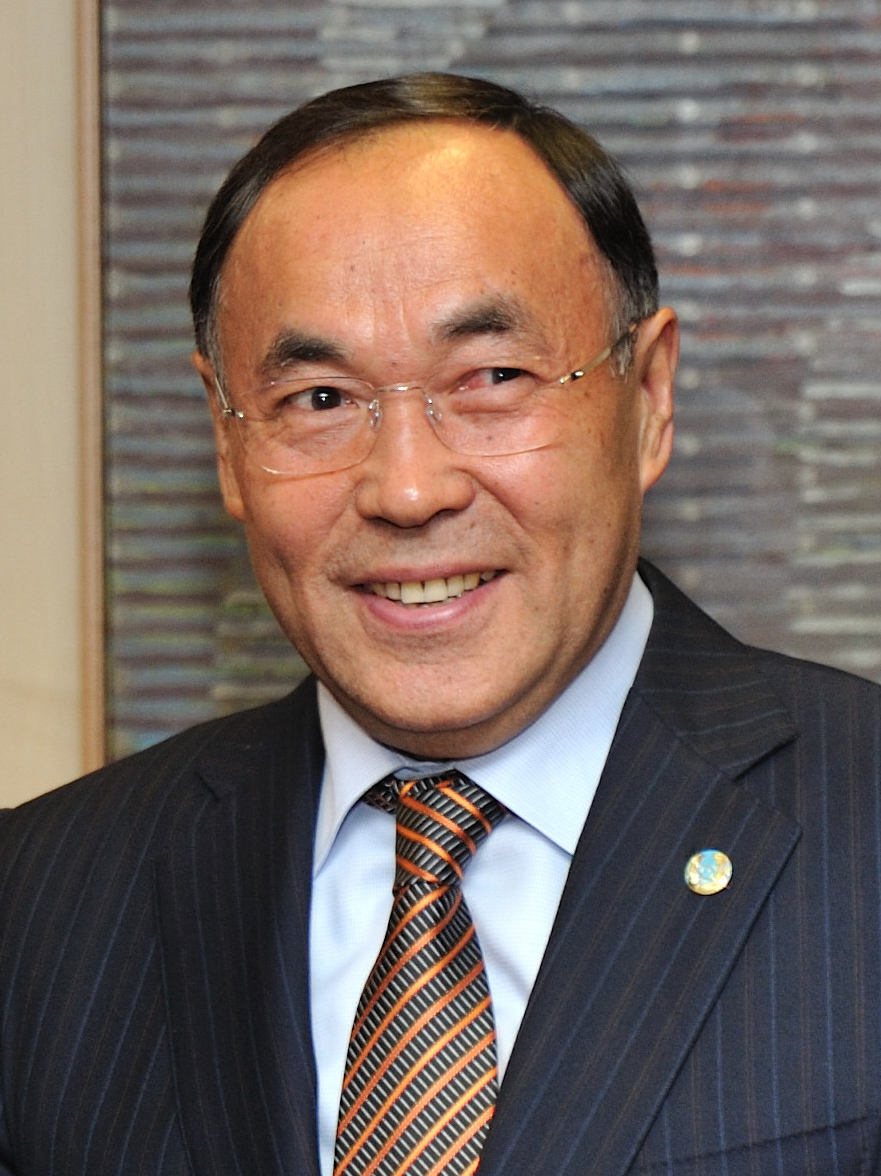
- Saudabayev in 2010

State Secretary of Kazakhstan
- In office 15 May 2007 – 23 September 2012
- President: Nursultan Nazarbayev
- Preceded by: Oralbay Abdykarimov
- Succeeded by: Mukhtar Kul-Mukhammed

Head of the Office of the Prime Minister
- In office 13 October 1999 – 13 December 2000
- Prime Minister: Kassym-Jomart Tokayev
- Preceded by: Altai Tileuberdin
- Succeeded by: Altai Tileuberdin

Minister of Foreign Affairs
- In office 4 September 2009 – 8 April 2011
- President: Nursultan Nazarbayev
- Prime Minister: Karim Massimov
- Preceded by: Marat Tazhin
- Succeeded by: Yerzhan Kazykhanov
- In office 18 April 1994 – 12 October 1994
- Prime Minister: Sergey Tereshchenko
- Preceded by: Tuleutai Suleimenov
- Succeeded by: Kassym-Jomart Tokayev

Ambassador of Kazakhstan to the United States
- In office 14 February 2001 – 15 May 2007
- President: Nursultan Nazarbayev
- Preceded by: Bolat Nurgaliyev
- Succeeded by: Erlan Idrissov

Ambassador of Kazakhstan to the United Kingdom
- In office 14 November 1996 – 13 October 1999
- President: Nursultan Nazarbayev
- Preceded by: Nurtai Abykayev
- Succeeded by: Adil Ahmetov (2000)

Ambassador of Kazakhstan to Turkey
- In office 17 May 1992 – 14 November 1996
- President: Nursultan Nazarbayev
- Preceded by: Office established
- Succeeded by: Baltash Tursumbaev

Member of the Mazhilis
- In office 26 August 2015 – 20 January 2016

Personal details
- Born: 18 July 1946 (age 80) Zhetigen, Kazakh SSR, Soviet Union
- Children: 3
- Education: Academy of Sciences of the Soviet Union; Al-Farabi Kazakh National University

Kanat Bekmyrzauly Saudabayev (Kazakh: Қанат Бекмырзаұлы Саудабаев, Qanat Bekmyrzaūly Saudabaev; born 18 July 1946) is a Kazakh politician who served as the State Secretary of Kazakhstan from 2007 to 2012. Prior to that, he served as the Minister of Foreign Affairs from 2009 to 2011 and in 1994, Ambassador of Kazakhstan to the United States from 2000 to 2007, Ambassador to the United Kingdom from 1996 to 1999 and Ambassador to Turkey from 1994 to 1996.

== Early life and education ==
Saudabayev was born in the village of Zhetigen, close to Alma-Ata in 1946. In 1968, he graduated from the Saint-Petersburg State University of Culture and Arts, earning specialty in director. In 1981, he earned candidate of Philosophical Sciences from his thesis topic "Ways of convergence of the way of life of the urban and rural population". In 1988, Saudabayev graduated from the Academy of Sciences of the Soviet Union under the CPSU Central Committee. In 2000, he earned his doctorate from his dissertation topic "Kazakh-Turkish relations: formation, current state and development prospects".

== Early career ==
Before entering the diplomatic service, Saudabayev had a distinguished cultural career, serving as Kazakhstan’s Chairman of the State Committee of Culture with the rank of Minister, Chairman of the State Film Committee, and Deputy Culture Minister. He began his career as a theatrical producer.

From 1968 to 1972, he was a senior methodologist of the Republican House of Folk Art and the director of the Auezov Theater, director-director of the Kazakh circus collective "Soyuzgoscirka", creator of the ensemble "Tabunshchiki-dzhigits". In 1972, he became the director of the Kazakh State Circus.

== Political career ==
From 1976 to 1977, Saudabayev served as the head of the Culture Department of the Administrative Department of the Council of Ministers of the Kazakh SSR. In 1977, he became the Deputy Minister of Culture. From 1983 to 1988, Saudabayev served as the chairman of the State Committee of the Kazakh SSR for Cinematography. In 1988, he became the First Deputy Chairman of the State Committee of the Kazakh SSR for Culture. From 1990 to 1998, he was the chairman of the State Committee for Culture.

While working in Moscow from September 1991 through May 1992 as the Plenipotentiary Representative of the Kazakh Soviet Socialist Republic to the USSR, and then, after the Soviet Union collapsed, to the Russian Federation, Saudabayev was a direct participant in and a witness to many crucial events of that time. In the fall of 1991, Soviet President Mikhail Gorbachev appointed Saudabayev as the Soviet Ambassador to Turkey. As he was planning to take up his post, the Soviet Union ceased to exist. Within weeks Saudabayev was on his way to Turkey again, but as the first Ambassador from an independent Kazakhstan.

In the 1990s, he served as Kazakhstan’s Ambassador to the United Kingdom, and to Turkey. During 1994, as the Minister of Foreign Affairs, Ambassador Saudabayev worked to implement the developing foreign policy of the young independent state. He was Kazakhstan’s signatory to NATO’s Partnership for Peace agreement.

In 1999 and 2000, he served as the head of the Prime Minister’s Office with the rank of Cabinet member.

He served as Kazakhstan's ambassador to the United States from December 2000 until the political shakeup of 2007, when President Nursultan Nazarbayev promoted him to the position of the Secretary of State on 15 May 2007. In Washington D.C., Saudabayev brought an important contribution strengthening the strategic partnership between Kazakhstan and the United States in the spheres of security, nuclear disarmament, economy and democratic development.

On 4 September 2009, he was appointed as a Minister of Foreign Affairs taking on the responsibility for spearheading Kazakhstan's preparation for and holding of the rotating chairmanship of the Organization for Security and Cooperation in Europe in 2010. On 8 April 2011, Saudabayev was dismissed from the post and was succeeded by Erzhan Kazykhanov. However, he remained as the State Secretary until 23 September 2012, when Saudabayev was dismissed and replaced by Mukhtar Kul-Mukhammed as the State Secretary.

On 26 August 2015, Saudabayev became a member of the Mazhilis and served that position until its dissolution on 20 January 2016.

== Personal life ==
Saudabayev holds degrees from the Leningrad Institute of Culture and the Academy of Public Sciences of the Central Committee of Communist Party of the Soviet Union. He has a Ph.D. in Philosophy from the Kazakh State University and a Ph.D. in Political Science from the Moscow State University. His service has been recognized by the orders of Otan (Fatherland), Kazakhstan’s highest state award, and Kurmet (Distinguished Service).

Saudabayev is married with three children.

== See also ==
- Government of Kazakhstan

Preceded by Bolat Nurgaliyev	Ambassador of Kazakhstan to the United States; 14 February 2001 to 15 May 2007	Succeeded by ?
