= Tuleutai Suleimenov =

Soviet-Kazakh diplomat (born 1941)

- Төлеутай Сүлейменов
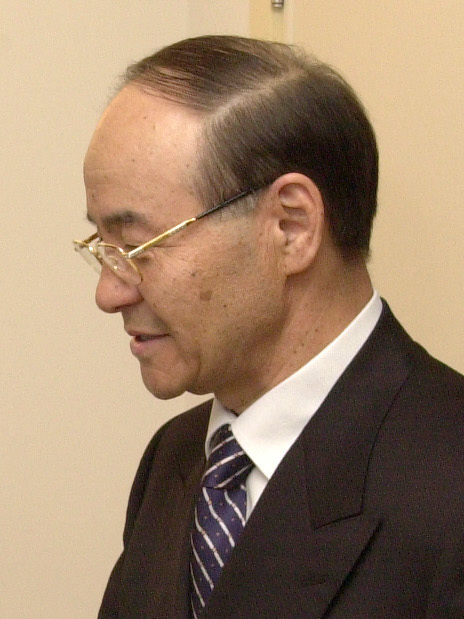
- Suleimenov in 2002.

Minister of Foreign Affairs
- In office December 1991 – April 1994
- President: Nursultan Nazarbayev
- Prime Minister: Sergey Tereshchenko
- Preceded by: Position established
- Succeeded by: Kanat Saudabayev

Personal details
- Born: October 1, 1941 (age 85) Semipalatinsk, Kazakh SSR, Soviet Union
- Children: 3

Tuleutai Suleimenov (Kazakh: Төлеутай Ысқақұлы Сүлейменов, Töleutai Ysqaqūly Süleimenov; born 1 October 1941) is a Soviet and Kazakh diplomat, who served as the first Minister of Foreign Affairs of Kazakhstan and the Ambassador of Kazakhstan to the European Union in 2003. He previously served as the ambassador to the United States from 1994 to 1996.

== Early life and career ==
He was born on October 1, 1941 in the city of Semipalatinsk. Comes from the Argyn tribe of the Karakesek clan. He graduated in 1967 from the Karaganda Polytechnic Institute. For 12 years, he was blast furnace shop foreman, engineer, shop foreman, secretary of the Komsomol committee of the Karaganda Metallurgical Plant. From 1971 to 1977, he served First Secretary of the Temirtau City Committee of the Young Communist League of Kazakhstan, Chairman of the City Committee of People's Control, and Second Secretary of the Temirtau City Committee of the Communist Party of Kazakhstan.

== Soviet diplomatic career ==
He graduated in 1980 from the Diplomatic Academy of the Ministry of Foreign Affairs of the USSR. Upon graduation, he immediately served as First Secretary of the Middle East Department of the USSR Ministry of Foreign Affairs for a year. His first diplomatic posting was for four years as Consul of the Consulate General of the USSR in Mazar-i-Sharif, Afghanistan. He then briefly from 1985–1986 was a student of the advanced training courses for senior diplomatic personnel of the foreign ministry. From 1986–1987, he was Advisor to the Middle East Department and from 1987–1991, to the Soviet Embassy in Tehran.

== Republic of Kazakhstan ==
From 1991 – 1994, he served as the first Minister of Foreign Affairs of the Republic of Kazakhstan. He then served on various ambassadorial posts, first to the United States (1994 – 1996), then to Poland, Bulgaria, the Czech Republic, Slovakia and Romania (1997-2001), Belgium, Luxembourg, the Netherlands, the European Union and NATO (2001 - 2003), and Poland (2003 – 2005).

Since 2005, he has been Director of the Institute of Diplomacy, Vice-Rector, and Professor of the Department of Foreign Policy of the Academy of Public Administration under the President of Kazakhstan.

== Awards ==
- Order of Barys, 1st degree (2021)
- Order of Barys, 3rd degree (2016)
- Order of Parasat (2009)
- Order of Kurmet (2001)
- Order of Friendship (September 30, 2012, Russia)
- Order of Honorary Citizen of the Eurasian Union of States (Moscow, 2018)
- Commander of the Order of Merit (Hungary, 2001)
- Commander of the Order of Merit of the Republic of Poland (Poland, 2005)
- Order of the White Double Cross, 3rd class (Slovakia, 2001)
- Order of Glory (Afghanistan, 1985)
- Order of the Badge of Honor (1976)
- Medal "10 Years of the Constitution of the Republic of Kazakhstan" (2005)
- Medal "10 Years of the Armed Forces of the Republic of Kazakhstan" (2002)
- Medal "10 Years of the Parliament of the Republic of Kazakhstan" (2005)
- Medal "10 Years of Astana" (2008)
- Medal "20 Years of Independence of the Republic of Kazakhstan" (2011)
- Medal "20 Years of the Parliament of the Republic of Kazakhstan " (2011)
- Medal "20 Years of the Armed Forces of the Republic of Kazakhstan" (2011)
- Medal "Enbek ardageri" (2015)
- Medal “25 Years of the Constitution of the Republic of Kazakhstan” (2016)
- Medal "25 Years of Independence of the Republic of Kazakhstan" (2016)
- Jubilee Medal "25 Years of the Diplomatic Service of the Republic of Kazakhstan"
- Medal "30 Years of Independence of the Republic of Kazakhstan" (2021)
- Medal "For Contribution to the Development of Foreign Policy of the Republic of Kazakhstan" (2008)
- Jubilee Medal of the First Class “30 Years of the Conference on Interaction and Confidence-Building Measures in Asia” (2022)
- Gold Medal of the Ministry of Foreign Affairs of Slovakia (2001)
- Commemorative Medal of the Ministry of Foreign Affairs of the Czech Republic (2001)
- Jubilee Medal "In Commemoration of the 100th Anniversary of the Birth of Vladimir Ilyich Lenin" (1969)
- Certificate of Honor of the President (2002, 2007, 2021, 2022)
- Honorary Diploma of the Ministry of Foreign Affairs of Poland with a medal (2013)
- Honorary Diploma of the Hungarian Ministry of Foreign Affairs with a medal (2013)
- Letter of thanks from the President (2011, 2016)
- Honored Worker of the Diplomatic Service of the Republic of Kazakhstan (2005)
- Laureate of the Al-Farabi State Prize in Science and Technology of the Republic of Kazakhstan (2020)
- Winner of the International Prize of the Economic Cooperation Organization (2012)

Preceded by Alim Dzhanmurzin	Kazakh ambassador to the United States; 1994 to 1996	Succeeded by Bolat Nurgaliyev
