= List of ambassadors of Kazakhstan to Ireland =

Ambassador of Kazakhstan to Ireland

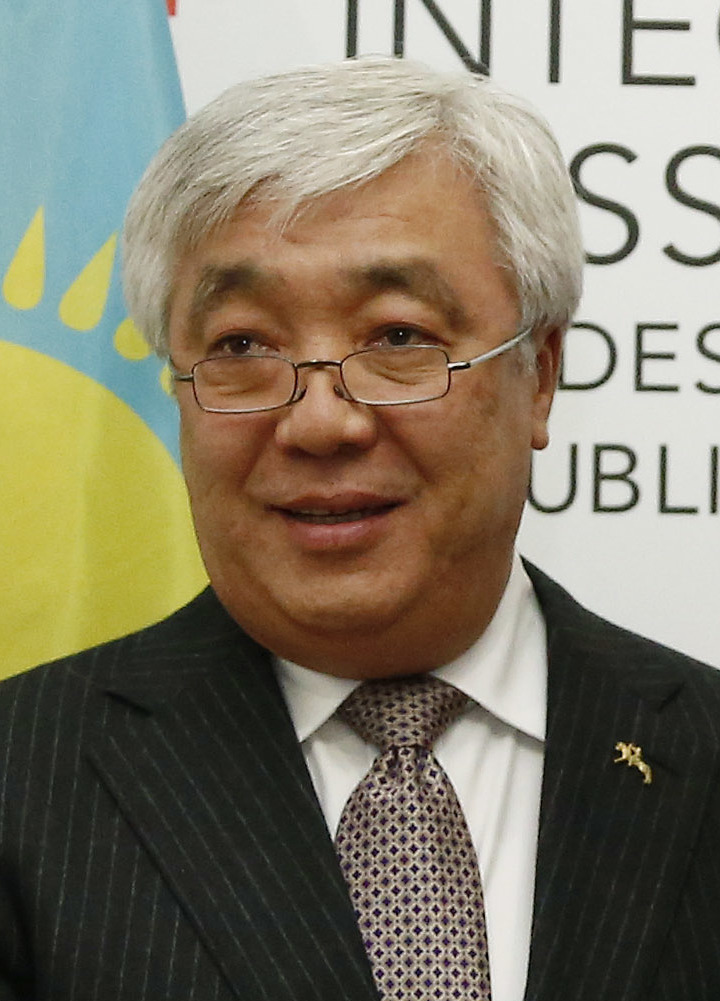
- Incumbent; Erlan Idrissov since 8 August 2017
- Ministry of Foreign Affairs
- Appointer: President of Kazakhstan
- Inaugural holder: Nurtai Abykayev
- Formation: 2 April 1996

The ambassador extraordinary and plenipotentiary of Kazakhstan to Ireland is the official representative of the president and the government of Kazakhstan to Ireland. Diplomatic relations were established on 2 April 1996.

== List of ambassadors ==
- Nurtai Abykayev (2 April 1996 – 7 September 1996)
- Erlan Idrissov (2 December 2002 – 4 July 2007)
- Qairat Abuisetov (5 August 2008 – 12 September 2013)
- Erlan Idrissov (8 August 2017 – present)
