= 2005 Kazakh Senate election =

- 19 August 2005

16 of the 39 seats in the Senate
- Turnout: 95.98%
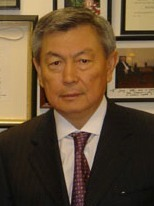
	First party
Leader	Nurtai Abykayev
Party	Nonpartisan
Leader since	10 March 2004
Last election	16
Seats won	16
Seat change	Steady
Percentage	100%
Chair before election
Nurtai Abykayev
Nonpartisan
Elected Chair
Nurtai Abykayev
Nonpartisan

Senate elections were held in Kazakhstan on 19 August 2005. All 16 seats representing the regions of Kazakhstan were elected by the local legislative bodies (maslihats). 3155 of the 3287 illegible electorates voted in the election.

== Electoral system ==
The members of the Senate of Kazakhstan are nonpartisan and are indirectly elected by the local legislative bodies Maslihats every six years. Each region and cities of Almaty and Astana are represented by two senators while 7 senators are appointed by the President of Kazakhstan.
