= Kazakh State Circus =

Main circus of Kazakhstan in Almaty

Coordinates: 43°14′20″N 76°55′2″E

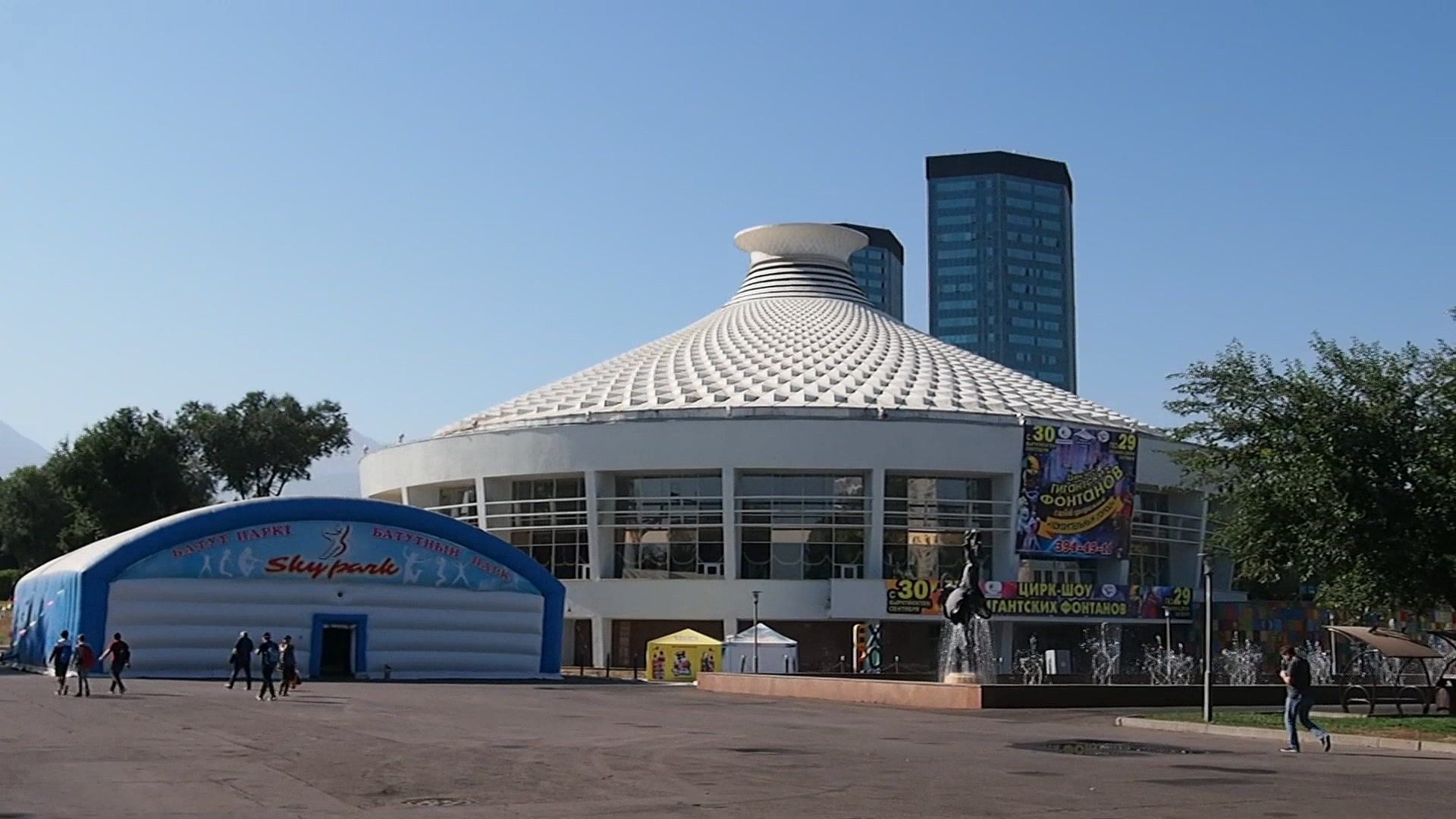

Origin
- Country: Kazakhstan
- Year founded: 1970

Information
- Website: circusalmaty.kz

Kazakh State Circus (Russian: Казахский государственный цирк, tr: Kazakhskiy gosudarstevnnyi ts'irk) is a main circus of Kazakhstan located in Almaty.

== History ==
Kazakh circus group of Soyuzgostsirk, Honored Collective of the Kazakh SSR, was created in 1970. Circus building was opened in 1972. In 1980, the circus became Honored Collective of the Kazakh SSR.

After the collapse of the Soviet Union, many artists from Soyuzgostsirk have moved to Alma-Ata, which has allowed to create a new team that has repeatedly had successful tours in China.

In 1983, artists Murat and Elizaveta Zhumagaliev received the prestigious Eduard Bass Grand Prize at the international competition in Prague. The Dosbatyrov circus artists were also winners at international circus festivals held in Verona (Italy), Belgium, Monte Carlo, and China. Artists T. Trestin and Zh. Bakenova secured first place at the European competition in Poland. In 1993, several Kazakh performers became laureates and medalists at a competition in China, including the aerial troupe “Air Flight” led by A. Kirichenko and Ph. A. Kirichenko, the dzhigits (equestrian acrobats) under the direction of K. Kunguzhinov, and the act “Rhenish Wheels” performed by V. Gashuta. In the American circus performs a group of Kazakh jigit-riders under the guidance of. K. Chalabaeva.The entertainment center "Harlequino" was opened on the territory of the circus in 2000. Riding school was founded in 2001.

== Architecture ==
The Kazakh circus building was constructed on the direct initiative of the First Secretary of the Communist Party of the Kazakh SSR Dinmukhamed Kunayev.

The circus has been working in its own new building since 1972.

== Monumental status ==
A new State List of Historical and Cultural Monuments of Local Significance in Almaty was approved on 10 November 2010, which gave the theatre its monumental status.
