= Byrganym Aitimova =

Kazakh politician (born 1953)

- Бірғаным Әйтімова
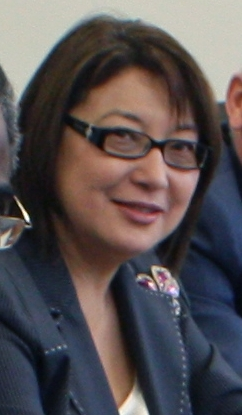
- Aitimova in 2009

Deputy Prime Minister of Kazakhstan
- In office 14 May 2004 – 13 December 2004
- Prime Minister: Daniyal Akhmetov

Minister of Education and Science
- In office 13 December 2004 – 10 January 2007
- President: Nursultan Nazarbayev
- Prime Minister: Daniyal Akhmetov
- Preceded by: Zhaksybek Kulekeyev
- Succeeded by: Zhanseit Tuymenbayev

Minister of Tourism, Physical Education and Sports
- In office 17 December 1993 – 24 January 1996
- President: Nursultan Nazarbayev
- Prime Minister: Sergey Tereshchenko; Akezhan Kazhegeldin
- Preceded by: Qaratai Tūrysov
- Succeeded by: Temirkhan Dosmukhanbetov

Member of the Senate
- In office 26 August 2013 – 12 August 2019
- Appointed by: Nursultan Nazarbayev
- In office 24 January 1996 – 16 October 1996
- Appointed by: Nursultan Nazarbayev

Member of the Supreme Council
- In office 25 March 1990 – 17 December 1993

Permanent Representative of Kazakhstan to the United Nations
- In office 9 February 2007 – 26 August 2013
- President: Nursultan Nazarbayev
- Preceded by: Erzhan Kazykhanov
- Succeeded by: Kairat Abdrakhmanov

Personal details
- Born: 26 February 1953 (age 73) Bakushino, Kazakh SSR, Soviet Union
- Party: CPSU (1977–1988); People's Congress (1993); People's Union of Kazakhstan Unity (until 1999)
- Spouse: Nūrlan Abdullaev
- Children: Säken; Sabina
- Education: Oral State Pedagogical University; Al-Farabi Kazakh National University

Bırğanym Saryqyzy Äitımova (Kazakh: Бірғаным Сарықызы Әйтімова, born 26 February 1953) is a Kazakh politician and diplomat who was a member of the Kazakh Senate from 2013 to 2019 and in 1996. She served as the Ambassador of Kazakhstan to the United Nations, Cuba, and Solomon Islands concurrently from 2007 to 2013. Prior to her appointment as UN ambassador, she was the Deputy Prime Minister of Kazakhstan from 2004 to 2005 and then the Minister of Education and Science until Zhanseit Tuymenbayev replaced her on 10 January 2007. She served as Kazakhstan's Ambassador to Italy from 2002 to 2004, and ambassador to Israel from 1996 to 2002.

== Biography ==
=== Early life and education ===
Aitimova was born in 1953 in the village of Bakushino (now Aqjol), West Kazakhstan Region. She graduated from the A.S. Pushkin Oral Pedagogical Institute with a specialty of English language, and then in 1994 from the Faculty of Law at Al-Farabi Kazakh National University with a degree in law.

=== Early career ===
After graduating from the institute in 1974, she worked as a teacher at a secondary school in the West Kazakhstan Region, then, in 1976–1979, she was a secretary of the Komsomol Committee of the State Farm, head of the sector, and head of a department of the Oral Regional Committee of the Young Communist League of Kazakhstan.

She was elected the First Secretary of the Oral City Committee of the Komsomol in 1979, and in 1981–the First Secretary of the Oral Regional Committee. From 1983, Aitimova worked as secretary of the Central Committee of the Komsomol until 1987, when she became the deputy chair of the Board of the Kazakh Branch of the Lenin Soviet Children's Fund.

=== Political and diplomatic career ===
From 1990 to 1993, Aitimova was the member of the Supreme Council of Kazakhstan where she served as the chair of the Committee for Youth Affairs. On 17 December 1993, she was appointed as the Youth, Tourism and Sports Minister by President Nursultan Nazarbayev and served in the post until being appointed as a member of the newly established Senate of Kazakhstan on 24 January 1996. That same year on 16 October 1996, Aitimova became the Kazakh ambassador to Israel.

On 7 August 2002, Aitimova was appointed as a Kazakh Ambassador to Italy. From there she worked in the post until she was appointed as a Deputy Prime Minister of Kazakhstan under Daniyal Akhmetov's government on 14 May 2004. From 13 December 2004, Aitimova was the Education and Science Minister until being dismissed on 10 January 2007. The following month on 9 February 2007, she was appointed as Permanent Representative of Kazakhstan to the United Nations and from 16 May 2007, as an Ambassador of Kazakhstan to Cuba.

On 26 August 2013, by the presidential decree, Aitimova was relieved of the posts of the Representative of Kazakhstan to the UN, ambassador to Cuba and Solomon Islands and was appointed as a Senator. She worked as member of the Senate Committee on Foreign Relations, Defense and Security from 17 October 2014 and the chair of the Committee on Social and Cultural Development and Science from 19 September 2016. On 12 August 2019, by the Decree of President Kassym-Jomart Tokayev, Aitimova was dismissed from the Senate as her term expired after working there for almost six years. In response to the decision, Aitimova responded saying:

I take it right. In accordance with the law, deputies of the Senate are appointed by decree of the Head of State, and upon the expiration of their mandate, their powers are terminated. All of this is legal. I am grateful towards Elbasy [Nursultan Nazarbayev], the President [Kassym-Jomart Tokayev], Dariga Nazarbayeva for giving me the opportunity to work at all stages of my career."

After being dismissed, Aitimova expressed her interests in doing career in business despite admitting not having experience in it, she stated any interests in working in position that would "suit herself, abilities and capabilities". However just few months later on 1 October 2019, Aitimova was elected as the deputy chair of the Council of Senators, an advisory body where current and former senators develop proposals, exchange experience, and conduct events aimed at the development of parliamentarism.

== Controversy ==
Aitimova was criticized for expressing condemnation of 1986 Jeltoqsan event, where young Kazakh students gathered in Republic Square to protest the central Soviet government while she served as a secretary of the central committee of Komsomol of the Kazakh SSR. Aitimova claimed that most students sharply expressed the hooligan actions of individual young people with a nationalist mindset and believed that they cannot represent interests and speak on behalf of the entire student body of the city.

On the third annual international conference of Bolashak, Aitimova gave an "inarticulate" speech, where she called Kazakhs an "ambitious nation", and, when speaking about the United Nations' goals to end illiteracy, she joked that "the special nation" "knows writing and reading since birth". In one of his shows, then-comedian Volodymyr Zelenskyy played a clip of her being inarticulate with her speech and commented on it, likening her to Ukrainian Vitali Klitschko. Years later, when Zelenskyy won in the 2019 Ukrainian presidential election, Aitimova commented on the jokes, stating that it was "obviously unpleasant", but perhaps jokingly, said that he owed her for "moral damage".

== Family ==
Aitimova is married to Nurlan Bek-Alievich Abdullaev and has two children Saken (born 1971) and Sabina (born 1989).

== Awards ==
- Order of Dostyk 2 degrees (2006)
- Order of Parasat
- Order of Kurmet (2001)
- Order of the Badge of Honor (1984)
- Certificate of Presidium of the Supreme Council of the Kazakh SSR
