= Erlan Idrissov =

Kazakh politician (born 1959)

- Ерлан Ыдырысов
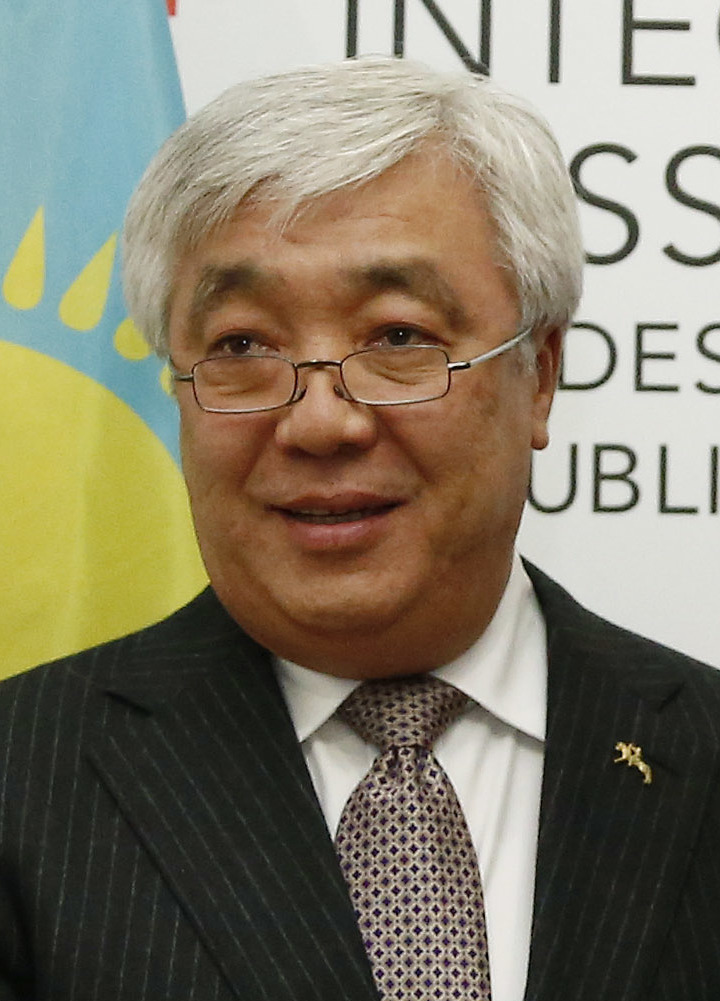
- Idrissov in 2015

Minister of Foreign Affairs
- In office 28 September 2012 – 28 December 2016
- President: Nursultan Nazarbayev
- Prime Minister: Serik Akhmetov (2012–2014); Karim Massimov (2014–2016); Bakhytzhan Sagintayev (2016)
- Preceded by: Yerzhan Kazykhanov
- Succeeded by: Kairat Abdrakhmanov
- In office 1 October 1999 – 29 January 2002
- Prime Minister: Kassym-Jomart Tokayev
- Preceded by: Kassym-Jomart Tokayev
- Succeeded by: Kassym-Jomart Tokayev

Ambassador of Kazakhstan to Iceland
- In office 8 August 2017 – 17 August 2022
- President: Nursultan Nazarbayev; Kassym-Jomart Tokayev
- Preceded by: Erzhan Kazykhanov

Ambassador of Kazakhstan to Ireland
- In office 8 August 2017 – 17 August 2022
- President: Nursultan Nazarbayev; Kassym-Jomart Tokayev
- Preceded by: Erzhan Kazykhanov
- In office 2 December 2002 – 4 July 2007
- President: Nursultan Nazarbayev; Kassym-Jomart Tokayev
- Preceded by: Erzhan Kazykhanov

Ambassador of Kazakhstan to the United Kingdom
- In office 30 December 2016 – 17 August 2022
- President: Nursultan Nazarbayev; Kassym-Jomart Tokayev
- Preceded by: Erzhan Kazykhanov
- In office 14 June 2002 – 4 July 2007
- President: Nursultan Nazarbayev
- Preceded by: Adil Ahmetov
- Succeeded by: Kairat Abusseitov

Ambassador of Kazakhstan to the United States
- In office 4 July 2007 – 28 September 2012
- President: Nursultan Nazarbayev
- Preceded by: Marat Tazhin
- Succeeded by: Kairat Umarov

Personal details
- Born: 28 April 1959 (age 67) Karkaraly, Karaganda Region, Kazakh SSR, Soviet Union
- Party: Nur Otan
- Other political affiliations: CPSU (1986–1990)
- Education: Moscow State Institute of International Relations; Russian Diplomatic Academy of the Ministry of Foreign Affairs

Erlan Äbılfaiyzūly Ydyrysov (Note: Often transliterated as Yerlan Abilfayizuly Idrissov through a Russified Romanization) (Kazakh: Ерлан Әбілфайызұлы Ыдырысов, [jerˈɫɑn æbɘlfɑˌjɯzʊˈɫɤ əd(ə)ˈrəsəf]; born 28 April 1959) is a Kazakh politician who served as Foreign Minister of Kazakhstan from 1999 to 2002 and from 2012 to 2016.

In June 2002, his Foreign Ministership ended. He became the Kazakh ambassador to the United Kingdom; during his term in this role he was also accredited to three other countries. After serving in London, Idrissov assumed the role of Ambassador to the United States in July 2007.

In September 2012, Idrissov was appointed Foreign Minister of Kazakhstan after serving as the Ambassador to the United States until October 2012. The appointment was widely viewed by western analysts as a sign of Nazarbayev's intent to maintain strong relations with the west. As Foreign Minister, Idrissov sought to improve relations with states in the South and Central Asia region. During a March 2013 visit to Tajikistan, Idrissov met with President Emomali Rahmon and Foreign Minister Hamrokhon Zarifi and signed a “Program of Cooperation” that reaffirmed bilateral commitment to cooperation in the areas of energy, migration, political and water issues. Idrissov chaired the February and April meetings in Almaty of the P5+1 talks with Iran over the country's nuclear program, embodying Kazakhstan's multi-vector foreign policy and desire to act as a mediator in regional disputes, as it did during the 2010 conflict in Kyrgyzstan and is now attempting to do with respect to the development of hydropower resources in Tajikistan. Idrissov visited the offices of the European Commission in Brussels in January 2013, as well as with NATO Secretary general Anders Fogs Rasmussen at the organization's headquarters in Brussels to discuss key issues regarding security and the withdrawal of international forces from Afghanistan. During the first few months of 2013, Idrissov met with leaders in Europe, opening a new Embassy of Kazakhstan in Finland and announcing plans for a diplomatic presence in Sweden in 2013. On December 28, he was dismissed as foreign minister.

In February 2017, Idrissov was appointed Ambassador of Kazakhstan to the United Kingdom of Great Britain and Northern Ireland. He was later concurrently ambassador to Ireland and to Iceland. He left all three ambassadorial posts in August 2022.

== Biography ==
=== Early life and education ===
Idrissov was born to a Muslim Kazakh family in the city of Karkaralinsk (present-day Karkaraly). His father is Abu'l-Fayz Idrissov. From 1976, he attended the commercial department of the Faculty of International Economic Relations in Moscow State University where he studied Urdu and English. He graduated from the university in 1981.

In 1992, Idrissov graduated from the Diplomatic Academy of the Ministry of Foreign Affairs of the Russian Federation.

=== Career ===
In 1981, he became an assistant at the VO Tyazhpromexport in Pakistan. From 1985 to 1990, he served as a Second Secretary and the First Assistant Secretary of the Ministry of Foreign Affairs of the Kazakh SSR, head of the Press and Information Department, and head of the State Protocol Department of the Ministry of Foreign Affairs. In 1991, he was an employee at the Soviet Embassy in India.

After graduating, he became the First Secretary and the head of the Department of the Ministry of Foreign Affairs of Kazakhstan. From 1992 to 1995, Idrissov served as a Second and First Secretary of the Permanent Representative of Kazakhstan to the UN. In 1995, he became the head of the Department of American Countries of the Ministry of Foreign Affairs. From 1995 to 1996, Idrissov was the Ambassador-at-Large of the Ministry of Foreign Affairs. In 1996, he was appointed as the assistant to the President of Kazakhstan for International Affairs. In 1997, Idrissov became the First Vice Minister of Foreign Affairs and then was the Vice Minister and Director of the 1st Department of the Ministry of Foreign Affairs.

From 1998, he served as the First Vice Minister of Foreign Affairs again until 13 October 1999, when he was appointed as the Minister of Foreign Affairs. Shortly after being dismissed on 28 January 2002, Idrissov served as the First Vice Minister until he was appointed as the Ambassador of Kazakhstan to the United Kingdom on 14 June 2002. From 2 December 2002, he served as the ambassador to Sweden, Norway and Ireland concurrently.

On 4 July 2007, Idrissov was appointed as the Ambassador of Kazakhstan to the United States and from 11 September 2017, he served as Ambassador to Brazil concurrently.

On 28 September 2012, he was appointed as the Minister of Foreign Affairs again and served that position until he was relieved on 28 December 2016. On 30 December 2016, he was reappointed as the Ambassador of Kazakhstan to the United Kingdom. From January 1, 2017 - August 2022, he served as Ambassador Extraordinary and Plenipotentiary of the Republic of Kazakhstan to the United Kingdom of Great Britain and Northern Ireland, and from August 2017 - August 2022, he was also Ambassador Extraordinary and Plenipotentiary of the Republic of Kazakhstan to Iceland and Ireland concurrently.

== US relations ==
On 8–10 July 2013, Idrissov paid an official visit to the United States and held meetings with Secretary of Defense Chuck Hagel, Secretary of Energy Ernest Moniz, National Security Adviser Susan Rice, Deputy National Security Adviser Antony Blinken, U.S. Trade Representative Michael Froman, and Deputy Secretary of State William Burns. In his talks with high ranking U.S. officials the two sides highlighted the robust and growing bilateral ties between Kazakhstan and the United States and the Strategic Partnership Dialogue, and reaffirmed their commitment to deepen US–Kazakhstan relations.

Idrissov took part in the meeting of foreign ministers of Central Asia and the United States in the C5+1 format. The meeting took place in Washington, D.C., on 3 August 2016. The six ministers agreed to launch five projects aimed at developing the transport, logistics and energy potential of Central Asia, as well as improving border infrastructure and strengthening regional security. The U.S. plans to support these projects with up to $15 million.

== Latin America ==
On 1 October 2013, Minister Idrissov became the first Kazakhstan Foreign Minister to visit South America. He visited the countries of Ecuador, Argentina and Chile. The purpose of the visit was to speak about the Kazakhstan 2050 Strategy, Expo 2017, and creating bilateral cooperation. During his meeting with Chilean Foreign Minister Alfonso Navarro, the milestone agreement was the abolishment of visas between Chile and Kazakhstan. Chilean and Kazakhstan citizens can visit these countries without the need for a visa. In Ecuador, the same agreement was made for a 30-day trial period to strengthen trade, business, and tourism for both countries. While visiting Argentina, Idrissov discussed areas in travel, tourism, technology, energy, agriculture, beef, nuclear energy, and space.

== United Nations ==
Minister Idrissov has led Kazakhstan's candidacy for Kazakhstan's election to be a non-permanent member of the UN Security Council for 2017–18. Idrissov highlighted the key elements of the country's candidature since formally initiating the process in September this year, which is focused on ensuring global nuclear, water, food and energy security. Idrissov has led Kazakhstan's advocacy effort at the United Nations to achieve a nuclear weapons-free world.

On 6 May 2016, Foreign Minister Erlan Idrissov represented Kazakhstan at the high-level forum titled Religions for Peace at the United Nations General Assembly. He stressed that it was important to break the links between terrorism and religions and noted that on May 31 Astana would host an international conference under the title “Religions Against Terrorism.”

Erlan Idrissov contributed to Kazakhstan's election as a non-permanent member of UN Security Council. It was announced in June 2016 that Kazakhstan would serve on the UNSC in 2017-2018.

In September 2016, Erlan Idrissov participated in the 71st session of the UN General Assembly. Within the session, Erlan Idrissov met with Foreign Ministers of other countries, including U.S. Secretary of State John Kerry. During his visit to New York Erlan Idrissov also participated in the meeting of Central Asian Foreign Ministers. The meeting had a symbolic meaning, since 2016 is the year when all Central Asian countries celebrate the 25th anniversary of their independence.

== Non-permanent membership in UNSC 2017–2018 ==
Kazakhstan set priority questions for its non-permanent membership in the UN Security Council in 2017–2018. One of them is security and development issues in the Central Asian region. In order to represent the interests of the entire region, Kazakhstan's Foreign Minister Erlan Idrissov conducted trips to the capitals of the Central Asian states and Afghanistan in late 2016.

== Small Island Developing States ==
Erlan Idrissov visited Samoa for the Third International Conference of Small Island Developing States (SIDS) on 1–3 September 2014. The participants of the Conference discussed the geographical isolation of the Pacific Islands that creates fundamental challenges hindering their growth and prosperity. Idrissov noted that Kazakhstan shares many challenges with SIDS. Just as Kazakhstan is land-locked, the Pacific Islands are, in a way, sea-locked, with their encirclement by the ocean and their remoteness from major growth hubs, aggravating, not helping their lot. This is why Kazakhstan felt it was important to participate in the event and share the story of what they, as an upper middle income country in the early years of its development, have done to overcome the challenges of geography and, more importantly, how that can be applied to support SIDS.

== Opinion Editorials by Erlan Idrissov ==
1. Regional integration is the "key" to stabilizing Afghanistan, EurActiv, November 21, 2013
2. A New Step Forward to Greater Regional and Global Security, The Astana Times, May 13, 2014
3. Kazakhstan leads green initiative, USA Today, June 10, 2014
4. Kazakhstan looks to ‘Future Energy’ with EXPO 2017, Energy Global, June 10, 2014
5. The Great Gain Not the Great Game: How Kazakhstan is Charting its Own Course in the World, The Diplomatic Courier, November 13, 2015
6. Building a Joint Future for ASEM: View from Kazakhstan, ASEF, December 23, 2015
7. Kazakhstan: Disarmament is key, EurActiv, January 20, 2016
8. The Real Cause of the 21st Century, The Diplomat, April 19, 2016
9. Kazakhstan’s experience can help promote greater understanding at UN Security Council, Financial Times, May 10, 2016
10. Kazakhstan: An Exercise in Democracy, The Diplomat, May 19, 2016
11. Kazakhstan Determined to Stay the Course of Sustainable Growth, The Diplomat, June 13, 2016
12. High time for Central Asia and Kazakhstan to have a voice in UN Security Council, The Hill, June 22, 2016

== Notes ==
Political offices
Preceded by Kassym-Jomart Tokayev	Minister of Foreign Affairs; 1999–2002	Succeeded by Kassym-Jomart Tokayev
Preceded by Yerzhan Kazykhanov	Minister of Foreign Affairs; 2012–2016	Incumbent
