= Balzhan Bultrikova =

- Балжан Бөлтірікова
- Born: Balzhan Bulktikovna Bultrikova; 15 November 1921; Kassyk, Jambyl Region, Kirghiz Autonomous Socialist Soviet Republic, of the Russian Socialist Federative Soviet Republic
- Died: 14 May 1998 (aged 76); Almaty, Kazakhstan
- Occupations: Teacher, stateswoman
- Years active: 1942–1980

Balzhan Bultrikova (Kazakh: Балжан Бөлтірікова; Baljan Böltırıkova, 15 November 1921 – 14 May 1998) was a Soviet and Kazakh teacher and politician who helped establish the diplomatic corps in the Kazakh Soviet Socialist Republic. She was the first woman to serve as Minister of Foreign Affairs and first Kazakh diplomat to participate in the General Assembly of the United Nations. She was honored with numerous medals and awards, including the Order of the Badge of Honour and the Order of the Red Banner of Labour.

== Early life ==
Balzhan Bulktikovna Bultrikova was born on 15 November 1921 (Note: Most sources give Bultirkova's birth date in November 1921, but Mamyrbekov gives the alternate date of 22 November 1922) in the village of Kassyk in the Jambyl Region of Kirghiz Autonomous Socialist Soviet Republic, which was a part of the Russian Soviet Federative Socialist Republic. She was the youngest child in a family with two older brothers and from a young age wanted to become a teacher and attend school so that she would not have to labor in the beet harvests. She attended the local school and after the sixth grade began teaching adult literacy classes. When she graduated, as the top student in her school, Bultrikova won a gold medal and a trip to Moscow.

In 1937, Bultrikova moved to Almaty to attend the normal school run by Lyubov Aleksandrovna Fedulova. Easily passing the entrance exams, she admired Fedulova, and was grateful that her Russian-exiled teacher could help with learning Russian. During her schooling, she met and married Iskander Kozhabayev, one of the first Kazakhs to defend a PhD. Graduating with honors in 1941, enrolled in the Abai Kazakh National Pedagogical University to continue her education, studying language and literature. Because of the war, she transferred to the correspondence courses, finishing her education in 1943, with distinction.

== Career ==
In 1942, Bultrikova began her career as the head teacher of Lepsinsky High School in the Taldy-Kurgan Oblast, while still in school. After a few months, she was transferred to Almaty high school No.12, where she would become the school's director. In 1949, Bultrikova was elected as chair of the Primary and Secondary School Worker's Union of the Central Committee of the Kazakh Communist Party. Serving in the post until 1955, the following year she became the Minister of Social Security for the Kazakh Soviet Socialist Republic. In this post, she focused on providing humanitarian assistance to vulnerable sectors of society including disabled persons, the elderly, orphaned children and veterans. In addition to providing pensions, she organized kindergartens and nurseries; sponsored schools and workshops to assist blind, deaf and mute Kazakhs; and established a factory to build prosthetics. In 1957, in recognition of her work, she was awarded the Order of the Badge of Honour.

For a decade she served in the Ministry of Labor and Social Protection, before being promoted in 1966 as Deputy Chair of the Council of Ministers and the Minister of Foreign Affairs, the first Kazakh woman appointed to serve as Foreign Affairs Minister. That same year, she was selected to serve on the Soviet of Nationalities of the Supreme Soviet of the Soviet Union. She was the first Kazakh representative to the United Nations General Assembly. and served for five and a half years in the post. In the 1970 session (25th Session) of the general assembly, she worked to counter the establishment of a High Commissioner for Human Rights, as the USSR had ordered delegates to remove the issue from the agenda, as one that was not beneficial to the nation. Twice she used her diplomatic skill with Asian and African delegates to prevent the development of the post. She was awarded for those efforts with the Order of the Red Banner of Labour.

At the end of her term in 1971, Bultrikova was appointed as the Minister of Education and Science of the Kazakh SSR, serving to 1974. That year, she became the Deputy Chair of the State Committee on Professional Education. During her tenure, she worked to improve secondary education in Kazakhstan, converted primary schools to full-time facilities, and developed vocational and technical schools, before her retirement in 1980.

== Death and legacy ==
Bultrikova died on 11 May 1998 in Almaty, Kazakhstan. The apartment which she and her family of six, including two daughters and two sons, lived until her death was posthumously decorated with a plaque in her memory.
