= Ministry of Foreign Affairs (Kazakhstan) =

Government ministry of Kazakhstan

Ministry of Foreign Affairs of the Republic of Kazakhstan
- Қазақстан Республикасы Сыртқы істер министрлігі (Kazakh); Министерство иностранных дел Республики Казахстан (Russian)
- Emblem of Kazakhstan

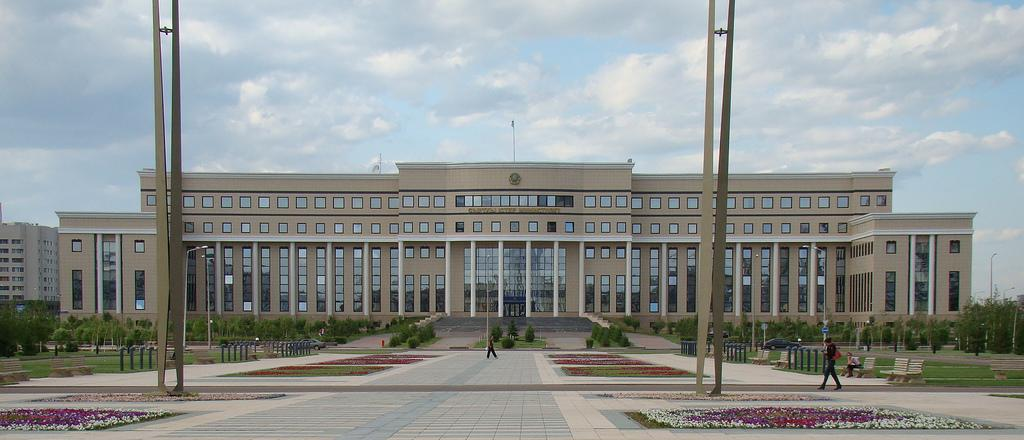

Agency overview
- Preceding agency: Ministry of Foreign Affairs of the Kazakh SSR
- Jurisdiction: Government of Kazakhstan
- Headquarters: Astana, Kazakhstan
- Minister responsible: Mukhtar Tileuberdi
- Website: http://mfa.gov.kz/

The Ministry of Foreign Affairs of the Republic of Kazakhstan (MFA RK, Kazakh: Қазақстан Республикасы Сыртқы істер министрлігі, romanized: Qazaqstan Respublikasy Syrtqy ıster ministrlıgı, ҚР СІМ; Russian: Министерство иностранных дел Республики Казахстан, МИД РК) is the Kazakh government ministry which oversees the foreign relations of Kazakhstan.

== History ==
The history of Kazakh diplomacy dates back to the period of the Kazakh Khanate where the Khans initiated the development of diplomatic relations and implemented the foreign policy. The Khanate's main purpose in terms of diplomacy was to negotiate the expansion of territories, with the desire to create trade routes, the travel roads, and trade centres for international exchange. The headquarters of the Kazakh khans had offices, which issued documents of a diplomatic and socio-economic nature. Kazakh khans appointed their envoys (known as ilchi), who were instructed to transmit messages and orders to neighboring rulers and governors.

The first modern Kazakh foreign ministry was formed in the early 1920s as the diplomatic office for the Turkestan Autonomous Soviet Socialist Republic. This person who headed the Ministry was known as the People's Commissar for Foreign Affairs of the Turkestan ASSR, whose activities were regulated by the Commissariat of Foreign Affairs of the Turkestan ASSR.

The position of a Minister of Foreign Affairs appeared in February 1944 after the adoption of the Soviet Law "On Submission of Powers to the Union Republics in the Field of Foreign Relations and on the Transformation of the People's Commissariat of Foreign Affairs from the All-Union into Union-Republic People’s Commissariat". This gave the Union republics the right to enter in direct relations with foreign states, however, the Ministry of Foreign Affairs of the USSR performed all the main foreign policy functions.

Following Kazakhstan's independence in December 1991, President Nursultan Nazarbayev invited Kazakhstani diplomats serving in the Soviet Ministry of Foreign Affairs and Soviet diplomatic missions abroad to return to Kazakhstan. Twelve career diplomats with extensive experience in the Soviet diplomatic service returned to help establish the country's foreign service.

On 17 December 1991, one day after Kazakhstan declared independence, Nazarbayev instructed Kazakhstan's Permanent Mission in Moscow to consult foreign ambassadors regarding their countries' positions on Kazakhstan's independence. Kassym-Jomart Tokayev, a former Soviet diplomat who later became president of Kazakhstan, participated in these consultations alongside Kanat Saudabayev, Kazakhstan's Permanent Representative in Moscow. They held meetings at the embassies of China, the United Kingdom, Germany, Japan, South Korea and Iran.

On 2 July 1992, Nazarbayev signed decrees establishing the legal framework for Kazakhstan's diplomatic service. The decrees defined the status and responsibilities of the Ministry of Foreign Affairs, Kazakhstan's diplomatic missions abroad, and ambassadors extraordinary and plenipotentiary. The date, 2 July, subsequently became Kazakhstan's Diplomatic Service Day.

== List of ministers ==
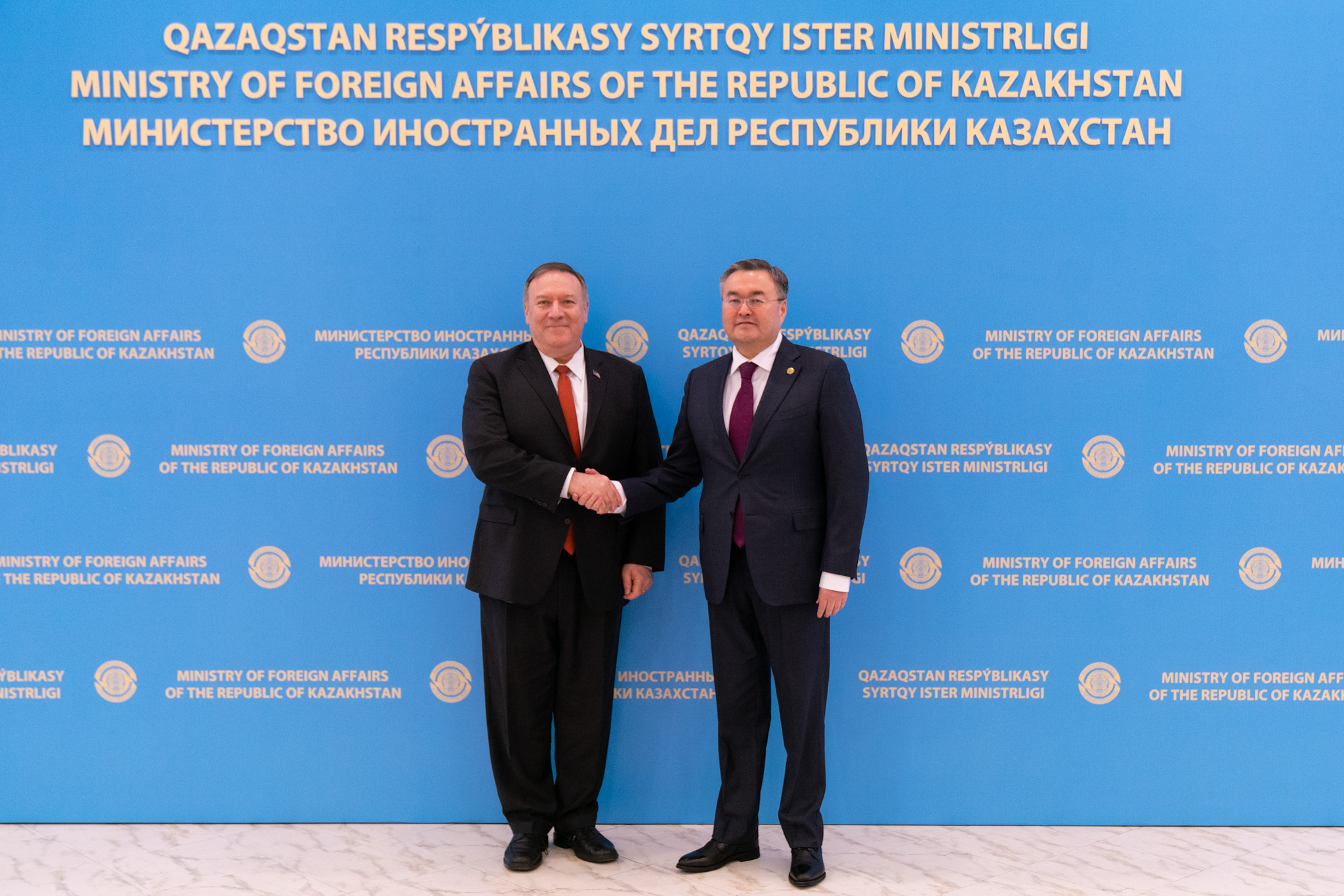
U.S. Secretary of State Mike Pompeo with now former Foreign Minister Tileuberdi at the ministry.

Name	Begin	End
Toleutay Suleymenov	December 1991	1994
Kanat Saudabayev	1994	1994
Kassym-Jomart Tokayev	1994	1999
Erlan Idrisov	1999	2002
Kassym-Jomart Tokayev	June 2003	January 2007
Marat Tazhin	January 11, 2007	September 4, 2009
Kanat Saudabayev	September 4, 2009	April 11, 2011
Yerzhan Kazykhanov	April 11, 2011	September 24, 2012
Erlan Idrisov	September 28, 2012	December 28, 2016
Kairat Abdrakhmanov	December 28, 2016	December 26, 2018
Beibut Atamkulov	December 26, 2018	September 18, 2019
Mukhtar Tleuberdi	September 18, 2019	March 29, 2023
Murat Nurtleu	April 3, 2023	26 September, 2025
Ermek Köşerbaev	26 September, 2025	Present
