= Akmaral Arystanbekova =

Kazakhstani diplomat (born 1948)

- Ақмарал Арыстанбекова
- Born: Akmaral Haidarqyzy Arystanbekova; 12 May 1948 (age 78); Almaty, Kazakh SSR, USSR
- Occupations: Diplomat and politician
- Known for: Ambassador to many countries and Permanent Representative to UN

Akmaral Haidarqyzy Arystanbekova (Kazakh: Ақмарал Хайдарқызы Арыстанбекова, Aqmaral Haidarqyzy Arystanbekova) is a Kazakhstani diplomat who served the Minister of Foreign Affairs of the Kazakh Soviet Socialist Republic from November 1989 to December 1991. She was the first Permanent Representative of Kazakhstan to the United Nations from 1992 to 1999. She was the fourth female ambassador among the 176 member states of the United Nations. After her UN assignment, she also served as Ambassador to France and Permanent Representative to UNESCO.

== Biography ==
Aqmaral Arystanbekova was born in Almaty on 12 May 1948 to a Sunni Muslim Kazakh family. She is the daughter of Haidar Arystanbekov and Shahrbanu Nurmuhammedova. She graduated with honors from the Kazakh State University with Bachelor of Science in Chemistry in 1971 and in 1975 followed up with Doctor of Philosophy (Ph.D). She continued her professional career as a faculty member at the Kazakh State University from 1975 to 1978.

From 1978 to 1983, she served as Chief Secretary of the Central Committee of the Kazakh Komsomol. She also served as Deputy Chairman from 1983 to 1984 and then as chairman from 1984 to 1989 of the Presidium of the Kazakh Society for Friendship and Cultural Relations with Foreign Countries.

Arystanbekova became the Minister of Foreign Affairs in the Government of Kazakhstan in November 1989 and served till December 1991. In December 1991 she was assigned to New York to make preparations for Kazakhstan's entry to the United Nations which took place on 2 March 1992. At that time she worked in the Permanent Mission of the USSR, as a senior counselor. From April 1992 to October 1999, Arystanbekova served as the first Permanent Representative of Kazakhstan to the UN In 1996–1999 she also was Ambassador of Kazakhstan to Cuba. From 1994 to 1995, she was a Vice-President of the 49th session of the UN General Assembly. Her other roles in the UN were as Vice-Chairman of the Executive Board of UNICEF in 1998, and Vice-Chairman of the First Committee of 53rd UN General Assembly session during 1998. She completed her assignment as Permanent Representative of Kazakhstan to the United Nations in October 1999 when Kofi Annan, was the Secretary-General. Upon completion of the UN assignment she worked as Ambassador Extraordinary and Plenipotentiary of the Republic of Kazakhstan to France in 1999–2003 and Permanent Delegate to the UNESCO (1999–2001). Since 2003 she has served as Ambassador at Large of the Ministry of Foreign Affairs.

== Personal life ==
Arystanbekova has held the diplomatic rank of Ambassador Extraordinary and Plenipotentiary since 1993. She is the author of six monographs and numerous scholarly papers on international relations and world politics in domestic and foreign publications and she gives lectures at universities as a professor of the international studies. Arystanbekova also holds a doctorate degree in world history. She is fluent in English and French.

== Awards ==
- Order of Kurmet (1996)
- Jubilee Medal "25 years of Independence of the Republic of Kazakhstan" (2016)
- Nazir Tyuryakulov Medal (2008)
- Honorary Citizen of the City of Almaty (2018)
- Order of Friendship (2018)

She is also the recipient of awards from the Supreme Soviet of the Soviet Union in 1970 and 1981.

== Bibliography ==
- Meyer, Mary K.; Prügl, Elisabeth (14 January 1999). Gender Politics in Global Governance. Rowman & Littlefield Publishers. ISBN 978-0-7425-8135-7.

== See also ==
- Foreign relations of Kazakhstan
- List of the first female holders of political offices
