= Erzhan Kazykhanov =

Kazakh politician and diplomat (born 1964)

- Ержан Қазыханов
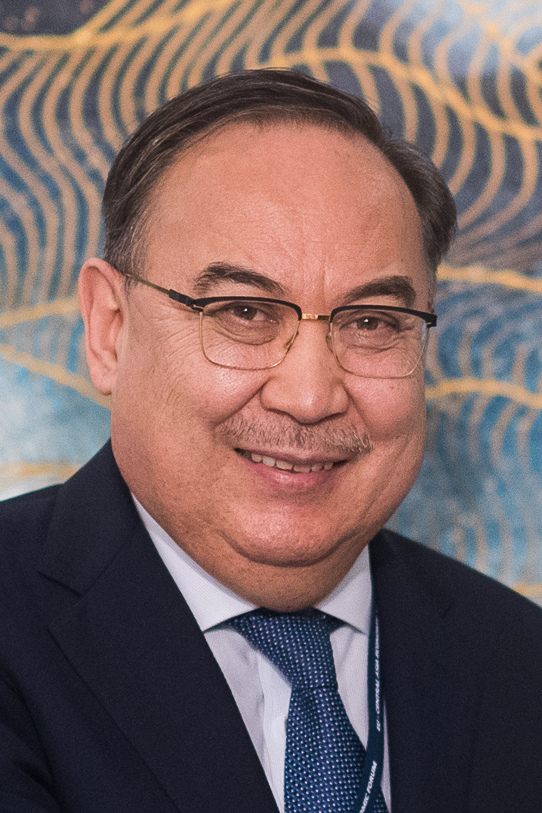
- Kazykhanov in 2019

Ambassador of Kazakhstan to the United States
- In office 15 February 2017 – 5 April 2021
- President: Nursultan Nazarbayev; Kassym-Jomart Tokayev
- Preceded by: Kairat Umarov
- Succeeded by: Yerzhan Ashikbayev

Ambassador of Kazakhstan to the United Kingdom
- In office 17 September 2014 – 15 February 2017
- President: Nursultan Nazarbayev
- Preceded by: Kairat Abusseitov
- Succeeded by: Erlan Idrissov

Assistant to the President of Kazakhstan
- In office 28 September 2012 – 4 July 2014
- In office 11 February 2008 – 26 December 2008
- President: Nursultan Nazarbayev

Minister of Foreign Affairs
- In office 11 April 2011 – 25 September 2012
- President: Nursultan Nazarbayev
- Prime Minister: Karim Massimov
- Preceded by: Kanat Saudabayev
- Succeeded by: Erlan Idrissov

Permanent Representative of Kazakhstan to the United Nations
- In office 8 May 2003 – 9 February 2007
- President: Nursultan Nazarbayev
- Preceded by: Madina Jarbussynova
- Succeeded by: Byrganym Aitimova

Personal details
- Born: 21 August 1964 (age 62) Alma-Ata, Kazakh SSR, Soviet Union
- Party: Nur Otan
- Education: Saint Petersburg State University; Al-Farabi Kazakh National University

Erzhan Hozeuly Kazykhanov (born 21 August 1964) is a Kazakh politician who serves as a diplomat. Kazykhanov holds a newly created position in the presidential administration with the title of Special Representative for International Cooperation. Prior to his appointment as the Ambassador to the U.S., Kazykhanov has served as Kazakhstan's Ambassador to the United Kingdom of Great Britain and Northern Ireland. Before becoming Ambassador to the UK, he held the position of Assistant to the President of the Republic of Kazakhstan and Minister of Foreign Affairs of Kazakhstan. He previously served as the Deputy Minister of Foreign Affairs of Kazakhstan, as well as the Ambassador of Kazakhstan to Austria, Permanent Representative of Kazakhstan to the International Organizations in Vienna and Permanent Representative to the United Nations in New York.

== Early life and education ==
Born in Alma-Ata, Kazykhanov earned his bachelor’s degree in Oriental studies from the Saint Petersburg State University in 1987. Kazykhanov holds Ph.D. in History from Al-Farabi Kazakh National University. He is the author of numerous articles on Kazakhstan’s foreign policy, economic diplomacy, multilateralism, and the role of the United Nations. He speaks Russian, English and Arabic, and is the recipient of several state awards and recognition.

== Ambassador to the United States ==
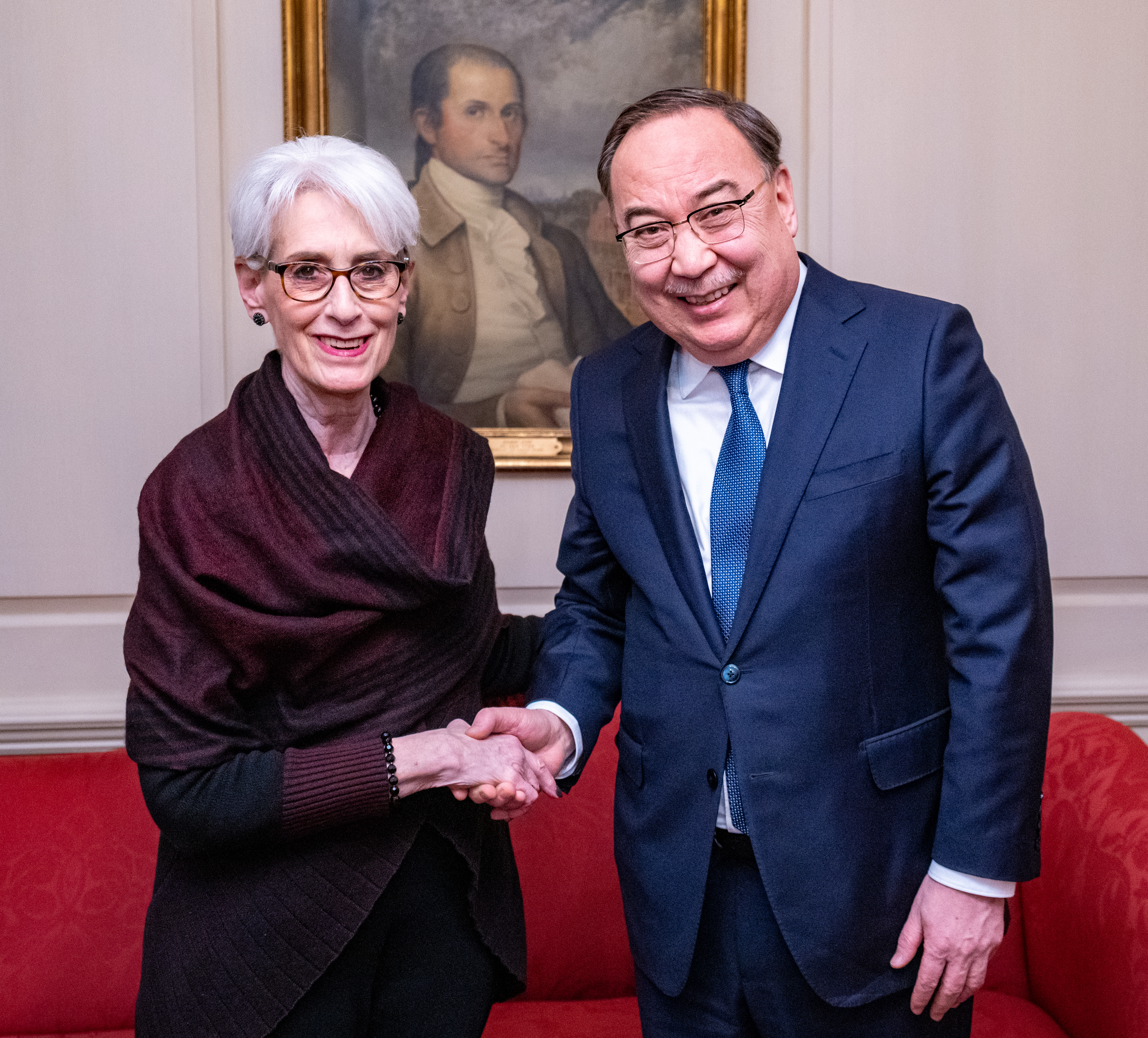
Kazykhanov with US Deputy Secretary of State Wendy Sherman in 2023

Kazykhanov presented his letter of credentials to President Donald Trump in the Oval Office on 24 April 2017. “The strategic partnership that Kazakhstan and the United States have built in the course of the past twenty-five years has matured into a strong bond of mutual trust, commitment and genuine friendship that both countries are truly proud of,” Kazykhanov said. “Astana and Washington share a common vision on many important issues of global politics. We are looking forward to deepening our bilateral relations”. In turn, Donald Trump highly praised the progress of Kazakhstan in the years of independence and its contribution to ensuring international and regional security. The U.S. President spoke for expanding the Kazakh-U.S. relations and expressed support to the oncoming EXPO 2017 exhibition to be held in Astana .

== Interviews and Publications ==
In April 2017, a published piece by Kazykhanoven titled "Finding the Energy for Increased Cooperation" noted that "Expo 2017 represents a clear opportunity for the United States and Kazakhstan to expand their excellent political and security relations further into the realm of economics, investment, and bilateral commercial deals. The United States government and the U.S. private sector have already made a significant commitment to Expo. American companies understand its value in showcasing the technology and innovation that the United States holds in energy. Expo 2017 should be seen as the first step in a larger effort to leverage Kazakhstan's unique standing among American friends and partners around the world, using the bilateral relationship to help address issues of critical importance to the United States. The United States and Kazakhstan have both entered a new era – one defined by innovative thinking and steadfast focus on the need to achieve results. We must seize the moment".

In the fall of 2017, Council of American Ambassadors published an article by Kazykhanov, "Kazakhstan: Building a Nuclear Safe World", where he notes that as the Soviet Union collapsed in 1991, the newly independent Kazakhstan overnight emerged as the fourth-largest nuclear power in the world. Having inherited the major Soviet nuclear testing site at Semipalatinsk and some of the largest nuclear weapons, including 104 SS-18 intercontinental ballistic missiles and 40 Tu-95 strategic bombers with air-launched cruise missiles—comprising approximately 1,410 nuclear warheads in total—the young country could pose a serious threat to the international community. But it did not pursue this destructive path. Instead, as a firm believer in confidence-building measures, dialogue and partnership, Nazarbayev laid down a comprehensive long-term strategy aimed at complete dismantlement and removal of one of the world’s most pivotal nuclear arsenals and establishment of his nation as a reliable partner globally".

In January 2018, Kazykhanov published op-ed in the Hill newspaper entitled "Kazakhstan can play a pivotal role in addressing today’s global challenges", where H.E. noted that as the first country from Central Asia to be elected onto the Security Council, it is both an honor and a responsibility. It is also a reminder that Kazakhstan does not just have good relations with the US but also our neighbors Russia and China, with Europe which is our main market, as well as nations across the Middle East and Asia. These friendships have enabled us to use our good offices to promote dialogue and co-operation regionally and globally. For example, Kazakhstan is increasingly playing a prominent role in fostering peace talks, including in the Middle East, hosting the Astana peace talks on Syria. Helping create the environment which will make greater co-operation possible is one of our top priorities for our time on the Security Council".

In the interview to the Leaders Magazine in April 2019 discussing Kazakhstan's emphasis on economic diplomacy, Kazykhanov noted, "in today’s highly competitive global environment, economic and trade ties are an increasingly important part of international diplomacy. Official government visits focus not only on international political issues, but also on the development of closer economic ties. Diplomatic posts around the world not only work on political and consular issues, but increasingly engage with foreign investors, businesses and trade partners. Each year the foreign ministry and its diplomats help to organize more than 300 trade, economic and investment events and approximately 600 foreign delegation visits to Kazakhstan. Such engagements facilitate an increase in foreign direct investment. Kazakhstan has attracted more than $300 billion dollars in FDI since gaining its independence, making the country the leading investment destination in Central Asia. In the last two years alone, foreign companies have invested over $20 billion annually in Kazakhstan’s economy. Kazakhstan continues to adapt to new global realities to stay competitive in attracting high-quality investments. As we seek to further modernize our economy in order to reach our goal of joining the top 30 most developed countries by 2050, we are looking to strengthen our efforts in attracting a diversified range of foreign investments and technologies".

In his interview to Foreign Affairs magazine, Kazykhanov said that "throughout the past decades, relations between Kazakhstan and the United States have grown profoundly both in substance and significance." Recognizing this positive trend in Kazakh-American relations and upon the formal invitation from the White House, President Nursultan Nazarbayev made an official visit to Washington, DC early this year to meet President Donald Trump, Vice President Mike Pence and a large number of America’s top business executives. Distinctively, these meetings cemented our country’s commitment to foster our cooperation in many areas of mutual interest, such as global politics and regional integration, defense and security, trade and investment, strategic energy dialogue, cultural and humanitarian links, and people-to-people relations. Most importantly, this high-level commitment was reflected through the adoption of the milestone document entitled, 'United States and Kazakhstan: An Enhanced Strategic Partnership for the 21st Century' which not only outlines the goals and priorities of our bilateral agenda but also sets a longterm vision to build a common future."

In May 2020, Kazykhanov published an op-ed in Washington Times where he spoke about Kazakhstan's efforts in containing the COVID-19 outbreak. He wrote that “The novel coronavirus has spread throughout the world and Kazakhstan has been no exception. This has been a difficult time for many, many people. Some have lost their incomes and their jobs, at least temporarily. Others have had their lives completely disrupted. In response, the government has taken many steps to protect its citizens from the infection and to help them overcome the economic challenges caused by the virus-related shutdown. In doing so, it has become a leader in the entire Central Asian region. President Kassym-Jomart Tokayev has worked hard to prevent the spread of the disease and to support Kazakhs economically. To date, both these efforts have largely worked. The COVID-19 pandemic is not growing exponentially in Kazakhstan as it is elsewhere in the world. Its actions have gotten positive reviews from the World Health Organization and other international experts”.
