= Mukhtar Tileuberdi =

Kazakh politician and diplomat (born 1968)

- Мұхтар Тілеуберді
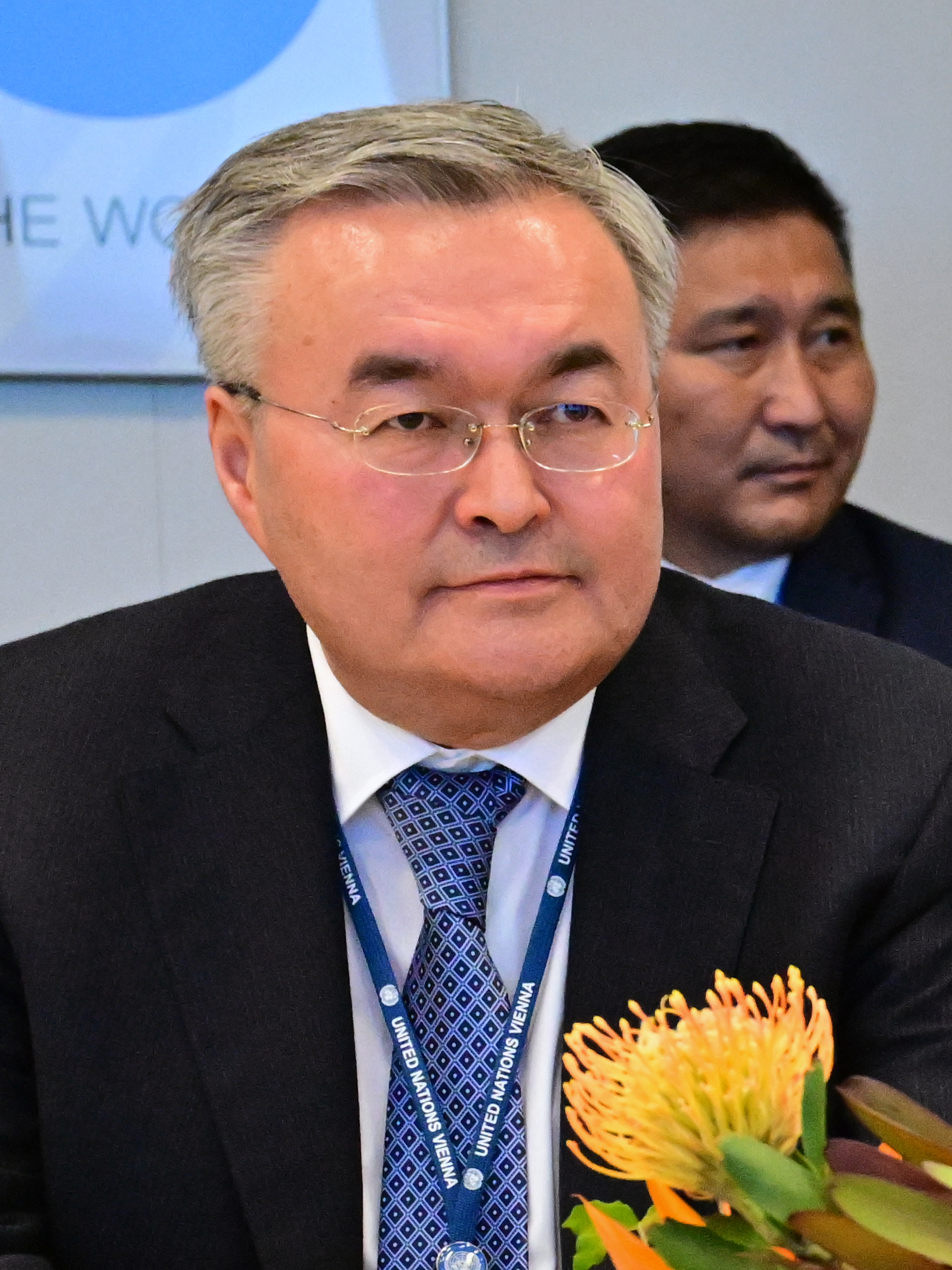
- Tileuberdi in 2025

Minister of Foreign Affairs of Kazakhstan
- Incumbent
- Assumed office 2 September 2026
- President: Kassym-Jomart Tokayev
- Prime Minister: Oljas Bektenov
- Preceded by: Ermek Köşerbaev
- In office 18 September 2019 – 29 March 2023
- President: Kassym-Jomart Tokayev
- Prime Minister: Asqar Mamin; Älihan Smaiylov
- Preceded by: Beibut Atamkulov
- Succeeded by: Murat Nurtileu

Kazakh ambassador to Austria and permanent representative to International Organizations in Vienna
- In office 14 August 2023 – 2 September 2026
- President: Kassym-Jomart Tokayev
- Preceded by: Älibek Baqaev
- Succeeded by: Ermek Köşerbaev

Deputy prime minister
- In office 18 January 2021 – 29 March 2023
- President: Kassym-Jomart Tokayev
- Prime Minister: Asqar Mamin; Älihan Smaiylov
- Succeeded by: Murat Nurtileu

Kazakh ambassador to Switzerland, Liechtenstein and Vatican
- In office 9 July 2009 – 4 March 2016
- President: Nursultan Nazarbayev
- Preceded by: Amanjol Jankuliev
- Succeeded by: Janar Aitjan

Kazakh ambassador to Malaysia, Indonesia, Brunei and Philippines
- In office 5 August 2004 – 9 July 2009
- President: Nursultan Nazarbayev
- Preceded by: Ikram Adyrbekov
- Succeeded by: Beibut Atamkulov

Personal details
- Born: Mukhtar Beskenuly Tileuberdi; 30 June 1968 (age 58) Aksu, Kazakh SSR, Soviet Union
- Children: 2
- Education: Kazakh State University
- Awards: Order of Parasat; Medal for Distinguished Labor

Mukhtar Beskenuly Tileuberdi (Note: Kazakh: Мұхтар Бескенұлы Тілеуберді, romanized: Mūhtar Beskenūly Tıleuberdı, [mo̙χtʰɑr b̥ʲesˈkʰʲeno̙ɫə́ tʰɘ̆lʲewb̥ʲerˈd̥ɘ]; Russian: Мухтар Бескенович Тлеуберди, romanized: Mukhtar Beskenovich Tleuberdi) (born 30 June 1968) is a Kazakh politician and diplomat serving as the Minister of Foreign Affairs of Kazakhstan twice, since 2026 and from 2019 to 2023. Previously, he was ambassador to Austria, Switzerland, Malaysia, Indonesia, Philippines and deputy prime minister from 2021 to 2023.

== Early life and education ==
Tileuberdi was born June 30, 1968, in the village of Aksu, Chimkent region. He graduated from Kirov Kazakh State University (Al-Farabi Kazakh National University) majoring in philosophy. After graduating from the university, he started working at the departments of History of Philosophy and Chinese Philology of the Al-Farabi Kazakh State University.

== Career ==
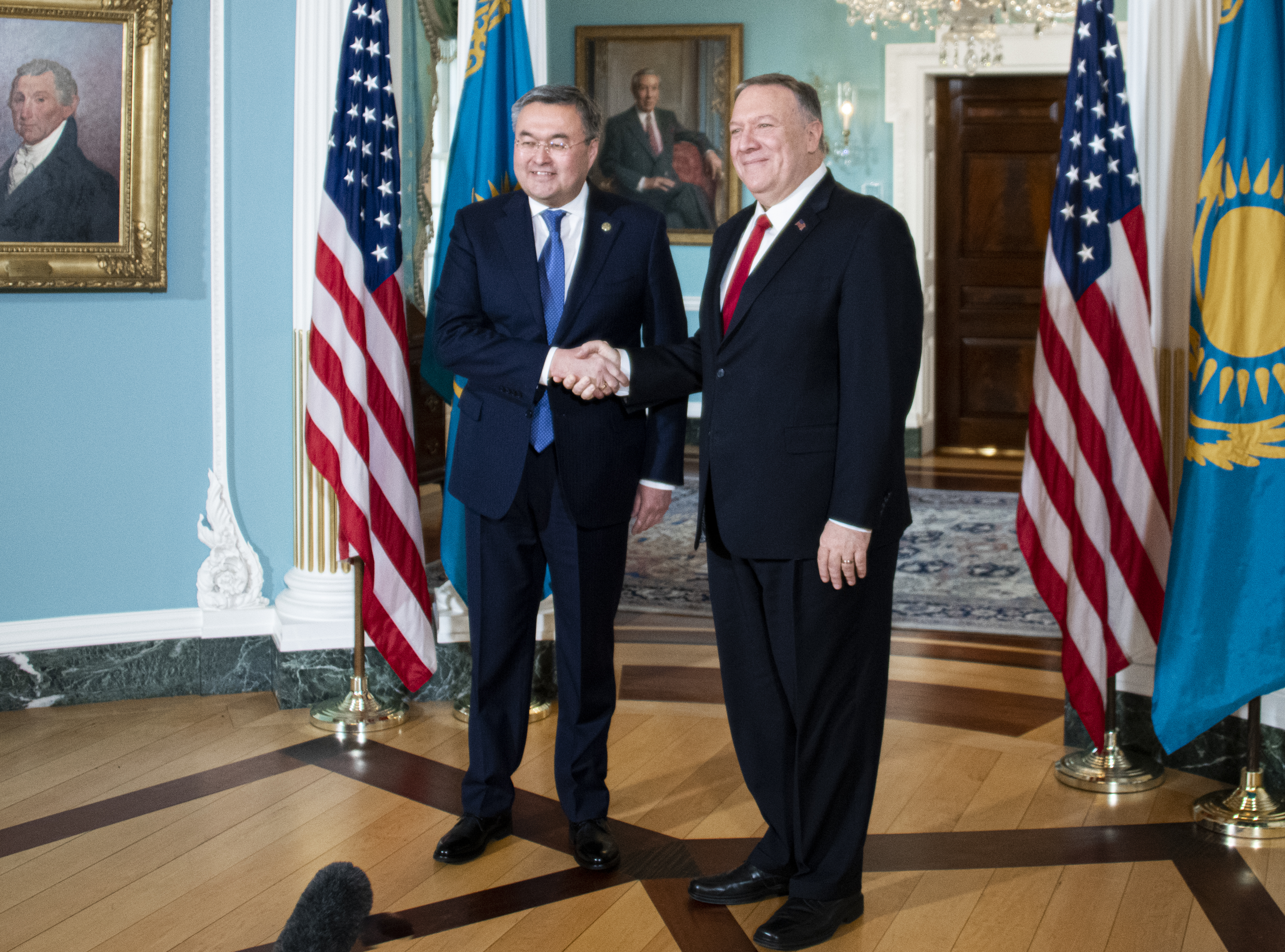
Tileuberdi meets with U.S. Secretary of State Michael R. Pompeo at the U.S. Department of State in Washington, D.C., 12 December 2019

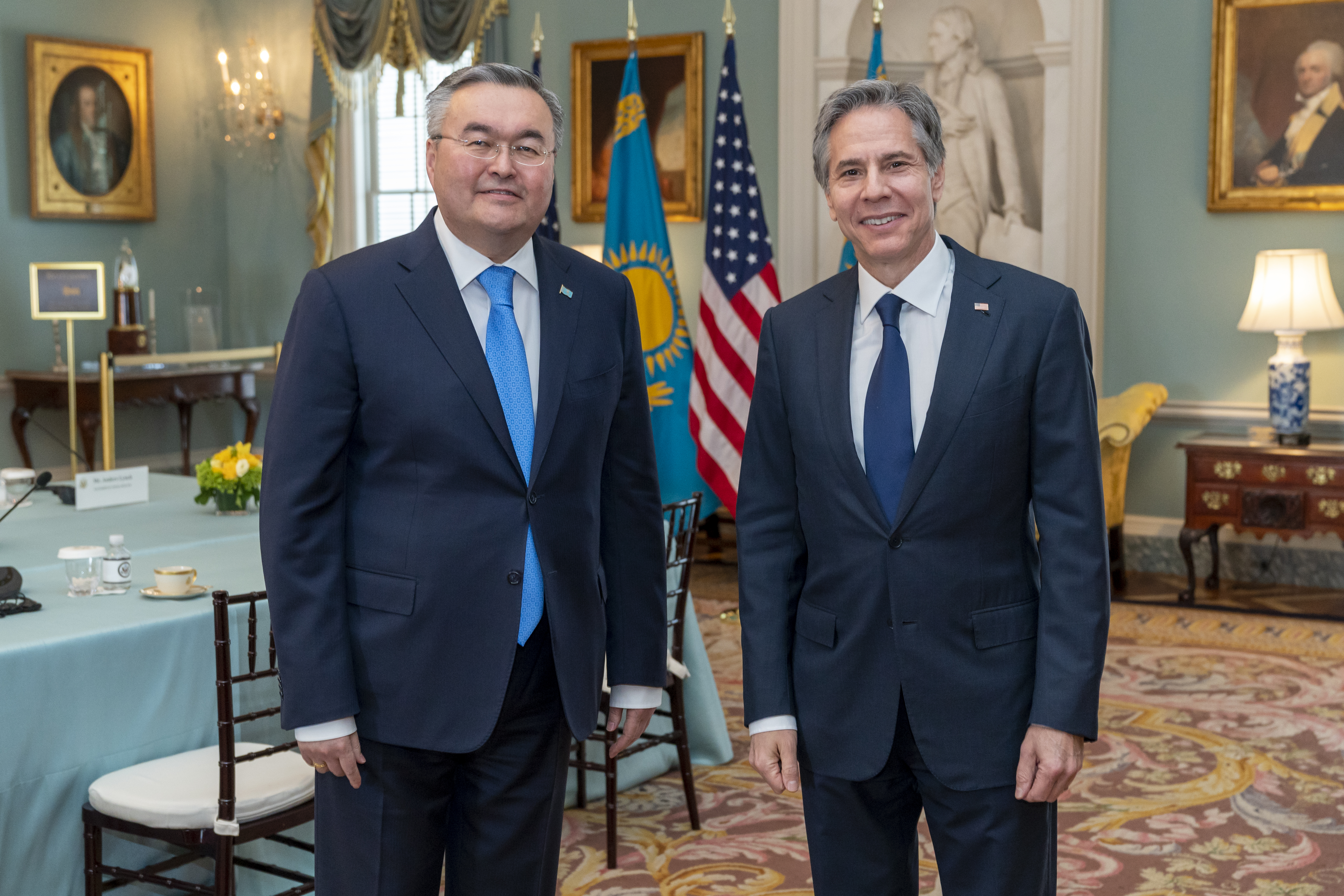
Tileuberdi meets with U.S. Secretary of State Antony Blinken in Washington, D.C., 20 May 2022

Tileuberdi was appointed as the Minister of Foreign Affairs on 18 September 2019. Prior to that, he had served as First Vice Minister of foreign affairs of Kazakhstan from 2016 to 2019.

Tileuberdi has an extensive diplomatic career. He served as Kazakhstan Ambassador to Malaysia with concurrent accreditation to Indonesia, Brunei, and the Philippines. He also served as Ambassador of Kazakhstan to the Switzerland and with concurrent accreditation to Liechtenstein and the Vatican. Additionally, he served as the Permanent Representative of Kazakhstan to the United Nations Office and other international organizations in Geneva.

During his tenure as Foreign Minister, Tileuberdi pays great attention to supporting foreign investors interested in the Kazakh market and Kazakh businesses abroad. In one of his op-eds Tileuberdi emphasized that the Foreign Ministry was at the forefront of economic diplomacy aimed at promoting Kazakhstan as an investment destination.

Tileuberdi is active in the advocacy of interethnic and interfaith tolerance.

== Awards ==
- Order of Parasat (2020)
- Medal for Distinguished Labor (2016)
