= Kairat Umarov =

Kazakh diplomat

- Қайрат Омаров
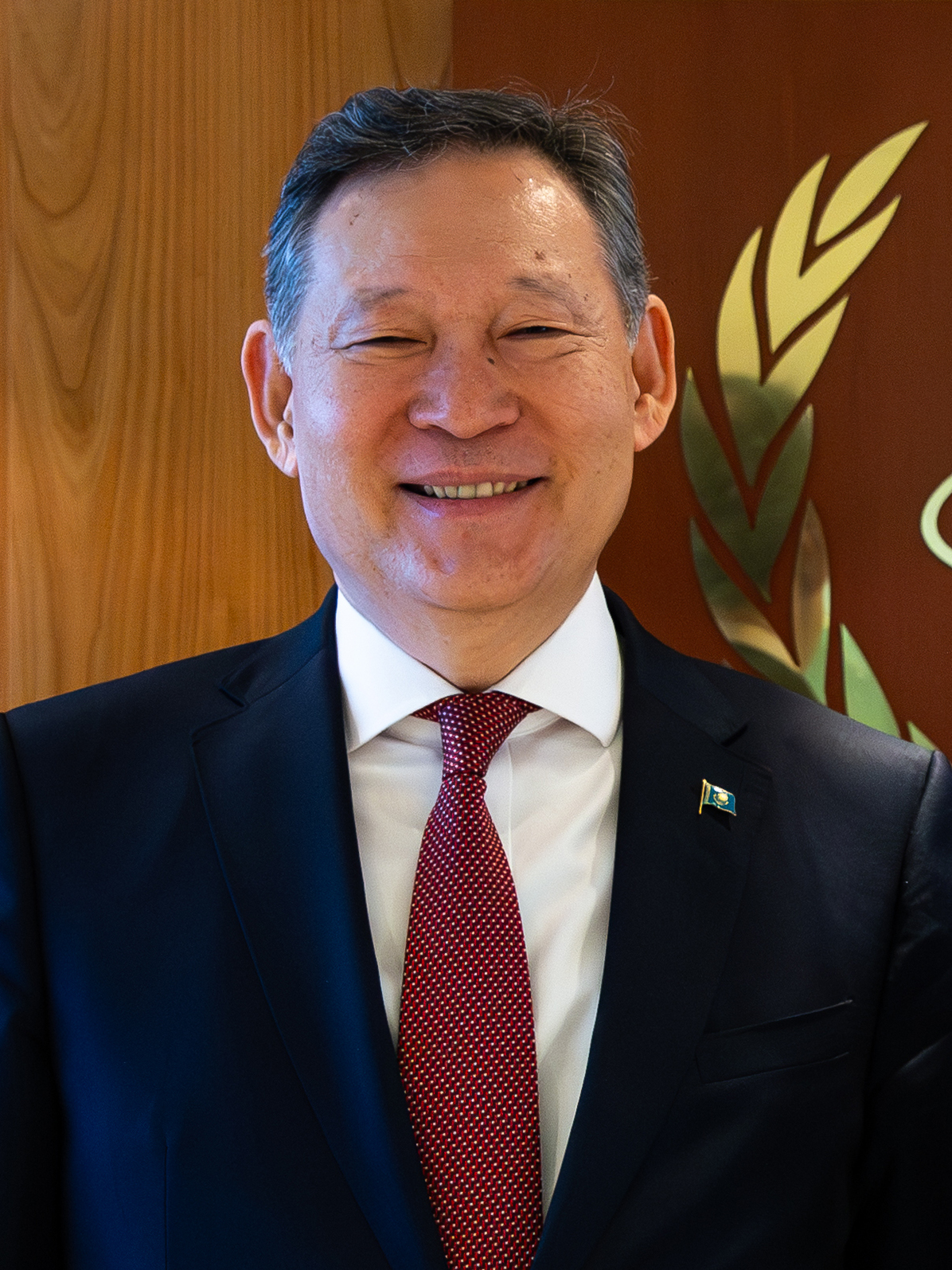
- Umarov in 2026

Permanent Representative of Kazakhstan to the United Nations
- Incumbent
- Assumed office 16 May 2024
- President: Kassym-Jomart Tokayev
- Preceded by: Akan Rakhmetullin
- In office 4 January 2017 – 30 September 2020
- President: Nursultan Nazarbayev; Kassym-Jomart Tokayev
- Preceded by: Kairat Abdrakhmanov
- Succeeded by: Magzhan Ilyassov

Personal details
- Born: 12 January 1963 (age 63) Ferghana, Uzbek SSR, Soviet Union
- Education: Kazakh Ablai Khan University of International Relations and World Languages

Qairat Ermekūly Omarov (Note: Often transliterated as Kairat Yermekovich Umarov through a Russified Romanization of Кайрат Ермекович Умаров.) (Kazakh: Қайрат Ермекұлы Омаров; born 12 January 1963) is a Kazakh diplomat. On October 6, 2022, he was appointed First Deputy Minister of Foreign Affairs of Kazakhstan.

== Biography ==
From 1998 to 2003, he served as Minister-Counselor at the Washington Embassy. From September 9, 2009, to January 4, 2013—Deputy Minister of Foreign Affairs of the Republic of Kazakhstan. From early 2013 to January 4, 2016, Umarov served as Ambassador of the Republic of Kazakhstan to the United States. From January 4, 2017, to September 30, 2020, he was appointed to the post of Permanent Representative to the United Nations. From September 30, 2020, to October 6, 2022, he was appointed Plenipotentiary Ambassador of Kazakhstan to the Republic of Austria, Permanent Representative of Kazakhstan to international organizations in Vienna. From October 21, 2021, to October 6, 2022, Ambassador Extraordinary and Plenipotentiary of the Republic of Kazakhstan to the Republic of Slovenia concurrently. On October 6, 2022, he was appointed First Deputy Minister of Foreign Affairs of Kazakhstan.

== Career ==
=== Ambassador of Kazakhstan to the United States ===
As Ambassador, Umarov has emphasized cooperation with the U.S. in the areas of economic development and investment. He has met with civil society groups and discussed religious freedom in Kazakhstan and has served on panels in Washington, D.C., on Kazakhstan’s economic and political influence in the region.

Presented his credentials to President Barack Obama in January 2013 after serving as Kazakhstan’s Deputy Foreign Minister since 2009. The cornerstone of the Kazakh—U.S. strategic partnership is nuclear nonproliferation and nuclear security.

Actively participated in establishing diplomatic relations with Belize. On November 7, 2013, Ambassador Umarov and U.S. Ambassador to Belize Nestor Mendez signed a joint communiqué on the establishment of diplomatic relations between the two countries.

Contributed to the development of legal cooperation between the countries. Thus, in February 2015 Kazakhstan and the U.S. signed the Treaty on Mutual Legal Assistance in Criminal Matters.

Wrote an op-ed in U.S. News & World Report making the case why Kazakhstan should serve as non-permanent member on the U.N. Security Council for 2017–2018.

In support of Kazakhstan's selection to the UN Security Council, the Ambassador cites Kazakhstan's founding of the Conference on Interaction and Confidence Building Measures in Asia, membership in Euro-Atlantic Partnership Council and the Partnership for Peace, NATO cooperation, annual hosting of the Congress of Leaders of World and Traditional Religions, chairmanship of the Organization for Security and Cooperation in Europe, involvement in the Shanghai Cooperation Organisation, hosting P5+1 talks on Iran's nuclear program, establishing KazAID and the Green Bridge Partnership Program, and work to ensure water and energy security.

== Building commercial ties with American companies and investors ==
In August 2014, Ambassador Umarov traveled to Southwest Missouri with Congressman Billy Long (R-MO7) and visited agribusinesses, manufacturing and high tech companies.

In late 2014, Kairat Umarov visited Houston, Texas. During the visit, Kairat Umarov met with Mayor of Houston Annise Parker, and they discussed a wide range of issues of strengthening trade-economic and cultural cooperation between Kazakhstan and Houston.

== EXPO 2017 ==
Ambassador Kairat Umarov played an important role in preparation of the U.S. companies participation in EXPO-2017. During the embassy event in November 2016 Ambassador welcomed APCO Worldwide as a partner that will design and manage the American pavilion "The Source of Infinite Energy".

== Opinion editorials by Kairat Umarov ==
1. Letter from Kazakhstan: Why we believe in the nuclear fuel bank, Bulletin of the Atomic Scientists, 27 August 2015
2. Expanding Into Central Asia: Kazakhstan Joins WTO, Forbes, 28 July 2015
3. Close the door on nuclear dangers, The Hill, 14 September 2014
4. Kazakhstan-U.S. Strategic Partnership on the Rise , The Astana Times, 24 March 2014.
5. Kazakhstan is a Serious Candidate for the U.N. Security Council, US News & World Report, 21 October 2013.

== Video interviews and speeches ==
1. Ethnic & Religious Diversity in Kazakhstan
2. US Investment in Kazakhstan
3. Speech at press conference for boxing match between Beibut Shumenov and Bernard Hopkins, 17 April 2014
4. Speech at UN General Assembly as Acting Foreign Minister, 29 September 2012
