= Kazakh Business in Turkey =

2021 Kazakh comedy film

- Theatrical release poster
- Directed by: Änuar Matjanov
- Produced by: Nurlan Koyanbayev
- Starring: Nurlan Koyanbayev; Jan Baijanbaev; Gülnaz Jolanova; Dariğa Badyqova; Ramazan Amantai; Qajet Smağul; Jahan Otarğaliev; Kadir Doğulu
- Release date: 30 December 2021 (Kazakhstan)
- Budget: $500,000 or c. $900,000
- Box office: c. 1.3 billion tenge

Kazakh Business in Turkey (Kazakh: Қазақша бизнес Түркияда, Russian: Бизнес по-казахски в Турции) is a 2021 Kazakh comedy film. A sequel to Kazakh Business in Korea (2019), it is the fifth movie of the Kazakh Business franchise.

== Background ==
The discussions regarding the filming of the movie in Turkey lasted two months, and producer Nurlan Koyanbayev spent this entire time in Istanbul. Koyanbayev arrived to the city on June 22, as that was the time when the airports opened despite the COVID-19 pandemic.

Different sources, both quoting Koyanbayev, state different budgets: $500,000 and 500 million tenge (c. $900,000).

== Production ==
The filming began on 10 September 2020, though it was originally planned to begin in August. The plate smashing tradition was done not by Koyanbayev, but guest actor Kadir Doğulu. The filming took place in Istanbul.

== Cast ==
Turkish actor Kadir Doğulu made a guest appearance in the movie. The main cast was also joined this time by Kazakh actors Jahan Otarğaliev and Qairat Ädilgerei.

Originally, Otarğaliev was chosen by Koyanbayev to play a main character, a role that would've required some knowledge of the Turkish language. Otarğaliev thus planned to take some courses from fellow actor Ädilgerei, who knew the language well. This led to Koyanbayev changing his mind and giving the role to Ädilgerei. This, however, almost created a feud between the two actors, and the decision was to be made through a vote. Fans, as well as celebrities, including Roza Rymbayeva, participated in the vote. However, both actors were chosen eventually.

== Plot ==
Businessman Jomart Qanatūly, (Note: Often transliterated as Zhomart Kanatovich through a Russified Romanization of Жомарт Канатович.) alongside the main cast of Alen, Baqdäulet and Erkoş, and newbie Marlen, flies to Turkey to buy a hotel in an auction. This, however, does not prove simple.

== Release ==
The film was released on 30 December 2021. It was planned to release on 24 December 2020 at first, but was delayed because of the global COVID-19 pandemic. A separate film was to be released in Turkey as well, dubbed in Turkish and combining all the best jokes of the franchise.

As the movie theatres opened only recently since the COVID-19 pandemic in Kazakhstan, the audience came to watch the film in big waves, so it was especially challenging to buy movie tickets. Not long after the premiere, in January 2022, the 2022 Kazakh unrest began, which obstructed the showing further.

== Reception ==
Creator Nurlan Koyanbayev, mentioning the $500,000 budget, later noted that the movie paid itself off and even earned some money, but the box office revenue was not in "enriching amounts". In March 2022, the movie eventually earned 1.3 billion tenge in the box office.
