= Kazakh Business in India =

2022 Kazakh comedy film

- Theatrical release poster
- Directed by: Änuar Matjanov
- Produced by: Nurlan Koyanbayev
- Starring: Nurlan Koyanbayev; Jan Baijanbaev; Gülnaz Jolanova; Dariğa Badyqova; Ramazan Amantai; Avika Gor
- Release date: 29 December 2022 (Kazakhstan)
- Box office: 1.28 billion tenge

Kazakh Business in India (Kazakh: Қазақша бизнес Үндістанда, Russian: Бизнес по-казахски в Индии) is a 2022 Kazakh comedy film. A sequel to Kazakh Business in Turkey (2021), it is the sixth movie of the Kazakh Business franchise.

== Production ==
The filming of the movie began in September 2022. It took place in New Delhi.

== Cast ==
The main cast, which included Nurlan Koyanbayev, Ramazan Amantai, Dariğa Badyqova, and Jan Baijanbaev, was accompanied by Indian guest actress Avika Gor, who has played in Koyanbayev's other movie, I go to school, and spoke Kazakh on-screen.

== Plot ==
The main cast, consisting of hotel owner Jomart (Nurlan Koyanbayev), his employee-relatives Alen (Jan Baijanbaev), Maqpal (Dariğa Badyqova), and Erkoş (Ramazan Amantai), make a business trip to India, where they meet Avika Gor. There, Jomart reveals his intention to sell the business, which would make the other characters unemployed. A feud ensues, but Jomart gets kidnapped, and the cast attempts to rescue him.

== Release ==
The film was released on 29 December 2022. As opposed to its previous movies, this film was only made public in the Kazakh-language showings.

== Reception ==
The movie received 1.28 billion tenge in the box office. It was among the TOP-10 best Kazakh movies of 2024 according to Kinopoisk. The film, as well as the entire franchise, was criticised for being repetitive and "uncreative". It was the sixth installation and fifth sequel.
