= Kazakh Business in Korea =

2019 Kazakh comedy film

- Theatrical release poster
- Directed by: Alen Niazbekov
- Produced by: Nurlan Koyanbayev
- Starring: Nurlan Koyanbayev; Jan Baijanbaev; Gülnaz Jolanova; Dariğa Badyqova; Ramazan Amantai; Qajet Smağul
- Release date: 24 December 2019 (Kazakhstan)
- Box office: c. ₸1.1 billion

Kazakh Business in Korea (Russian: Бизнес по-казахски в Корее, Kazakh: Қазақша бизнес Кореяда) is a 2019 Kazakh comedy film. A sequel to Kazakh Business in Africa (2018), it is the fourth movie of the Kazakh Business franchise.

Set in both South Korea and North Korea, the movie was the most successful Kazakh film in all of the history of Kazakhstan by box office, having already collected more than 919 million tenge in its first month of release. Later, it made history as the first Kazakh movie to earn a billion tenge.

== Production ==
As reported by actor Jan Baijanbaev, the filming often took 17–18 hours straight. Done in both Almaty and South Korea, the filming went on for 14 days. Gülnaz Jolanova reported having to learn some Korean, but admitted to have forgotten much of it later.

== Cast ==
The movie's cast included Nurlan Koyanbayev (as Jomart Qanatūly), Jan Baijanbaev (Alen), Gülnaz Jolanova (Aisūlu), Dariğa Badyqova (Maqpal), Qajet Smağulov (Baqdäulet), Ramazan Amantai (Erkoş), politician and entrepreneur Qairat Qudaibergen, singer Dilnäz Ahmadieva, and an unnamed member of the Ninety One boysband.

== Plot ==
Jomart Qanatūly (Note: Often transliterated as Zhomart Kanatovich through a Russified Romanization of Жомарт Канатович.) (Nurlan Koyanbayev), the owner of a renowned hotel in Almaty, makes a deal with international partners and introduced a brand new robot to the hotel. Powered by artificial intelligence, the robot is shortly broken by clumsy employee-relative Baqdäulet (Qajet Smağulov). The reparation is only possible in South Korea, so the main cast travel there. Much like in the other installations of the Kazakh Business franchise, character Erkoş (Ramazan Amantai) gets lost, and Jomart and Alen rescue him.

== Release ==
The movie's official pre-release screening took place in Almaty on 24 December 2019.

== Reception ==
In just the first week of its release, the movie became the most successful Kazakh film in all Kazakh history by box office. Later, it became the first Kazakh movie to earn a billion tenge in the box office. The film was shown in theatres for 45 days. By 6 February 2020, its box office was 1,139,314,940 tenge.

In his zakon.kz article, Albert Ahmetov commented that the movie's attempt to balance the emotional and comedic bits backfired at the creators Alen Niazbekov and Nurlan Koyanbayev, as the plot became poorer. This made them reuse their old tactic of pivoting for patriotism at the movie's ending, which was received inequally.
