= Kazakh Business in Brazil =

2023 Kazakh comedy film

- Theatrical release poster
- Directed by: Älişer Utev
- Screenplay by: Älişer Utev
- Produced by: Nurlan Koyanbayev
- Starring: Nurlan Koyanbayev; Jan Baijanbaev; Gülnaz Jolanova; Dariğa Badyqova; Ramazan Amantai; Qajet Smağul; Berik Tursynbekov; Maqsat Rahmet
- Cinematography: Älişer Utev
- Release date: 28 December 2023 (Kazakhstan)
- Running time: 80 minutes

Kazakh Business in Brazil (Kazakh: Қазақша бизнес Бразилияда, Russian: Бизнес по-казахски в Бразилии) is a 2023 Kazakh comedy film. A sequel to Kazakh Business in India (2022), it is the seventh movie of the Kazakh Business franchise.

== Production ==
When making the seventh movie, Koyanbayev chose to change the producing cast completely. Älişer Utev was chosen to write the screenplay and direct the movie. As noted by Koyanbayev himself, Utev took the movie more into the drama direction, unlike its previous installations.

Creator Nurlan Koyanbayev has speculated that the Kazakh Business in Brazil movie may become the last of the franchise.

The filming took place both in Brazil and Kazakhstan, starting from 15 September 2023. It took place in Rio de Janeiro and took 20 days.

== Cast ==
Nurlan Koyanbayev, Jan Baijanbaev, Gülnaz Jolanova, Dariğa Badyqova, Ramazan Amantai, and Qajet Smağul return to their roles from the previous movies. Berik Tursynbekov and Maqsat Rahmet star as new characters.

== Plot ==
Each of the main cast has now chosen their own path in life. Alen and Maqpal have succeeded in IT, Baqdäulet opened a hostel in the foothills, and Erkoş took up mixed martial arts. Jomart suffers from a midlife crisis, as no hobby or work satisfies him. Because of this, the cast makes him a surprise, invites him to the aul, and presents Jomart a statue of himself. Angered by this, he travels to Brazil, where there are the least Kazakhs in the world. He is, however, mistaken for a rich Chinese man and kidnapped in the airport.

== Release ==
The film was released on 28 December 2023. Unlike its previous movies, Kazakh Business in Brazil did not receive a separate private showing party.
