= Kazakh Business in Africa =

2018 Kazakh comedy film

- Theatrical release poster
- Directed by: Jenishan Momyşev; Änuar Matjanov
- Produced by: Nurlan Koyanbayev
- Starring: Nurlan Koyanbayev; Jan Baijanbaev; Ramazan Amantai; Qajet Smağul
- Cinematography: Azamat Dulatov
- Distributed by: Kazteleproduct
- Release date: 27 December 2018 (Kazakhstan)
- Budget: $500,000
- Box office: ₸772 million

Kazakh Business in Africa (Russian: Бизнес по-казахски в Африке, Kazakh: Қазақша бизнес Африкада) is a 2018 Kazakh comedy film. It is a sequel to Kazakh Business in America (2018), and is the third addition to the Kazakh Business film franchise.

The movie is the first Kazakh movie to ever be shot in Africa.

== Production ==
Filming of the movie took place in Nairobi, Kenya and Dubai, United Arab Emirates. During the Nairobi shooting, the movie crew, with the help of the Kenyan movie company Pontact, spent two weeks in Kenya, and shot different scenes in the savannah, the villages, and the tea plantations. Maasai people participated in the production. Rixos Dubai Premium helped with the Dubai shooting. In September 2018, the filming was finished. It went on for 23 days and was done by Azamat Dulatov.

== Plot ==
The movie once again follows hotel owner Jomart (Nurlan Koyanbayev). This time, the plot is centered around his planned marriage with Aisulu. Jomart and his business crew travel to Nairobi in order to start a tea business in Kenya. Ramazan Amantai reprises his role as Erkoş in the movie.

== Reception ==
The movie earned 772,386,445 tenge in the box office.
