= I Go to School =

2023 Kazakh comedy film

I go to school
- Theatrical release poster
- Directed by: Änuar Matjanov; Samal Smağulova
- Produced by: Nurlan Koyanbayev
- Starring: Ramazan Amantai; Altynşaş Şaiahmet; Avika Gor; Kadir Doğulu
- Release date: 10 March 2022 (Kazakhstan)

I go to school is a 2022 Kazakh comedy road movie. Based on protagonist Erkoş, it is a spinoff to the Kazakh Business franchise.

== Background ==
The phrase "I go to school" originates from the movie Kazakh Business in America (2017). It was originally uttered and repeated by Erkoş, Ramazan Amantai's character, during a running gag mocking his poor English proficiency, and later became an internet meme.

== Production ==
The filming took place abroad, and mainly in the Kazakh language.

== Cast ==
The main cast included Ramazan Amantai and Altynşaş Şaiahmet, who played the love interest of Amantai's character. Indian actress Avika Gor was a guest member who played another main role. It was the first time that Amantai has played in a main role as actor.

== Release ==
The movie's official screening took place in Almaty on 10 March 2022. Actress Avika Gor was invited there personally by Nurlan Koyanbayev.

== Legacy ==
When asked whether fellow Kazakh Business actors Jan Baijanbaev and Dariğa Badyqova and their characters will receive their own spinoffs as well, Koyanbayev mentioned that when the plot will take place in Australia or India, such movies will be made.
