= Kazakh Business =

2016 Kazakh comedy film

- Theatrical release poster
- Directed by: Jenishan Momyşev
- Screenplay by: Nurlan Koyanbayev; Arystan Kaunev; Älişer Utev
- Produced by: Nurlan Koyanbayev
- Starring: Nurlan Koyanbayev; Jan Baijanbaev; Äbunasyr Serikov; Gülnaz Jolanova; Qajet Smağul; Töreğali Töreäli; Sidharth Shukla
- Cinematography: Aidar Ospanov
- Distributed by: Kazteleproduct
- Release date: 29 December 2016 (Kazakhstan)
- Box office: ₸772,386,445

Kazakh Business (Russian: Бизнес по-казахски, Kazakh: Қазақша бизнес) is a 2016 Kazakh comedy film. Centering on hotel owner Kanat Baltabayev, it follows his and his unprofessional newly appointed employee relatives' misadventures.

Directed by musician and music video creator Jenishan Momyşev and produced by comedian Nurlan Koyanbayev, the film became a massive success. Later, sequels were made and the eponymous media franchise developed.

== Background ==
Kazakh Business was comedian, TV presenter, and actor Nurlan Koyanbayev's first movie. He was set to be its producer. Jenishan Momyşev, who was to direct the movie, has also never made a full-length film before. Koyanbayev commented that there were initially two movie ideas, but the team decided to go with Kazakh Business first.

The main character is played by comedian Nurlan Koyanbayev. The remaining cast of the movie included actors Jan Baijanbaev and Äbunasyr Serikov, actresses Quralai Änuarbekova and Gülnaz Jolanova, singer Töreğali Töreäli, and Bollywood star Sidharth Shukla.

== Production ==
The filming of Kazakh Business went from early May to late June 2016. The film was directed by musician Jenishan Momyşev. There were three screenwriters: Nurlan Koyanbayev, Arystan Kaunev, and Älişer Utev. Koyanbayev was the movie's producer, as well as the actor of its main character.

The filming of the movie took place in Almaty and Almaty Region.

== Plot ==
The plot of the film revolves around Jomart Kanatovich Baltabaev, (Note: In this name that follows East Slavic naming customs, the patronymic is Kanatovich and the family name is Baltabayev.) a hotel owner played by Nurlan Koyanbayev, the employees of whom leave right when he expects a visit from foreign investors. He then resorts to hiring his relatives instead, many of whom are from the auyl and therefore are not qualified.

Producer Nurlan Koyanbayev summarised the plot in a quote, saying, "In the West, a human to a human is a wolf, but in Kazakhstan, a human to a human is a relative".

== Reception ==
The film was set to be and was released on 29 December 2016.

The movie's box office collected 299,700,700 tenge, which made it a smash hit. The film's success led to producer Nurlan Koyanbayev making several sequels, thus creating the eponymous media franchise.
