= Kazakh Business in America =

2017 Kazakh comedy film

- Theatrical release poster
- Directed by: Jenishan Momyşev
- Screenplay by: Nurlan Koyanbayev; Säbit Rahimbaev; Äuez Äuezov
- Produced by: Nurlan Koyanbayev; Sanjar Mustafin
- Starring: Nurlan Koyanbayev; Jan Baijanbaev; Ramazan Amantai
- Distributed by: Kazteleproduct
- Release date: 28 December 2017 (Kazakhstan)
- Running time: 87 minutes
- Budget: c.$450,000
- Box office: ₸581 million

Kazakh Business in America (Russian: Бизнес по-казахски в Америке, Kazakh: Қазақша бизнес Америкада) is a 2017 Kazakh comedy film. A sequel to Kazakh Business (2016), it is the second part of the eponymous franchise.

== Background ==
Actor, comedian, and TV presenter Nurlan Koyanbayev's first ever movie, Kazakh Business, came out in December 2016. The film became a box office success, and a sequel was announced next year.

== Production ==
In June 2017, it was announced that Nurlan Koyanbayev and Kazteleproduct were searching for an actress to play the female lead, and were accepting applications through e-mail. The conditions were that the actress would have to be from 20 to 25 years old, fluent in both Kazakh and English, and with acting experience.

The film's budget was reported to be approximately $450,000. It was filmed in Almaty and Los Angeles.

== Cast ==
The main roles of the movie were played by actors Nurlan Koyanbayev, Jan Baijanbaev, and Ramazan Amantai. "The most famous American cop from Shymkent", Dimas Niyazov, Gülnaz Jolanova, and Qajet Smagulov also starred.

== Plot ==
Having saved his hotel from bankruptcy in the previous movie, main character Jomart (Nurlan Koyanbayev) expects a visit by American expert Adam Emers, who may award a 5-star review to the establishment. However, the foolish "chief of the bar gate opening department" Erkoş unwittingly scares Emers away by using the word "negro" (Russian: негр). Erkoş lies about the reason for Emers' leaving, and director Jomart, alongside his assistant Alen (Jan Baijanbaev), fly to Los Angeles to get a second chance from Emers.

== Reception ==
Kapital.kz reported, that the movie collected over 581 million tenge in the box office from 28 December 2017 to 15 February 2018. It was reported to be the highest-grossing Kazakh movie of its time.

Executive producer Rustam Yusupov reported that more than 180 thousand people saw the movie in theatres only a week into its premiere.

== Criticism ==
Kazakh journalist Aisulu Toişybek wrote to Vlast that the movie, despite preaching respect, contains xenophobic and sexist jokes, and does not reflect much respect among characters. She also commented that, having been demeaning regarding different people, especially foreigners, the many jokes in the movie "didn't always land", were outdated.
