= Dariğa Badyqova =

Kazakh actress

- Дариға Бадықова
- Born: 1 December 1985 (age 40); Furmanovka, Dzhambul Oblast, Kazakh SSR, Soviet Union
- Education: Kazakh National Academy of Arts
- Occupations: Actress; singer; film director
- Political party: Amanat (since 2023)
- Spouse: Darhan Mūsaev (m. 2008; div. 2024)

Dariğa Bolatqyzy Badyqova (Note: Often transliterated as Dariga Bolatovna Badykova through a Russified Romanization of Дарига Болатовна Бадыкова.) (Kazakh: Дариға Болатқызы Бадықова; born 1 December 1985) is a Kazakh actress and filmmaker. She is most notable for her acting work as Aisara in Kelinjan and Maqpal in the Kazakh Business movie franchise, as well as her directing work of the movie Taptym-au seni (2023).

== Early life and education ==
Badyqova was born on December 1, 1985, in the village Furmanovka of Dzhambul Oblast, Soviet Kazakhstan (now Moiynqum, Jambyl Region).

Her father, Bolat Atabaev, was an alcoholic and lived in the aul. He died of a heart attack, which moved Badyqova to direct the movie Taptym-au seni (2023). Badyqova spoke highly of her father and called him kind. She did not say the same about her mother, described her personality as "difficult", reported her shouting.

She studied "Musical drama and directing" at the Kazakh National Academy of Arts.

== Career ==
Badyqova is an actress, singer, and film director. She is known for having acted and sung in her own movie, Taptym-au seni (2023), alongside actor Oljas Abai. The movie was record-breaking, as it earned more than a billion tenge in just 10 days of its release. This way, it overtook Nurlan Koyanbayev's Kazakh Business in Korea (2019), which required a month for this feat.

Her other notable roles include Aisara in Kelinjan and Maqpal in the Kazakh Business movie franchise. She, however, did not appear in the film Kazakh Business in Brazil of the franchise due to budget concerns.

== Controversies ==
Badyqova is known for being a controversial celebrity. Having acted reportedly egotistic around crowds and controversially called herself "child of God", Badyqova later admitted in an interview that stirring controversies is her way of gaining publicity.

In December 2024, Badyqova started a controversy by criticising the Kazakh film audience that went to see the foreign Moana 2 (2024) and not her own movie, Taptym-au seni 2. She "admitted that there were Kazakhs" that went to see the movie, but commented that she did not know "what kind of a Kazakh they are [after that]". Not long afterwards, she became an internet meme and was named "pseudopatriot".

== Personal life ==
Badyqova spoke of herself as "strongly believing in God". She married fellow artist Darhan Mūsaev on 11 August 2008, and they divorced in the autumn of 2024.

In August 2025, Badyqova reported that her 28-year-old brother had Bekhterev's disease. She commented that she monthly buys him the necessary 1-million tenge medicine.

Badyqova is a member of the ruling Amanat political party. According to Badyqova herself, she liked the party because of its "motivating ideas to women".
