= Erke Esmahan =

Kazakhstani singer and actress (born 1984)

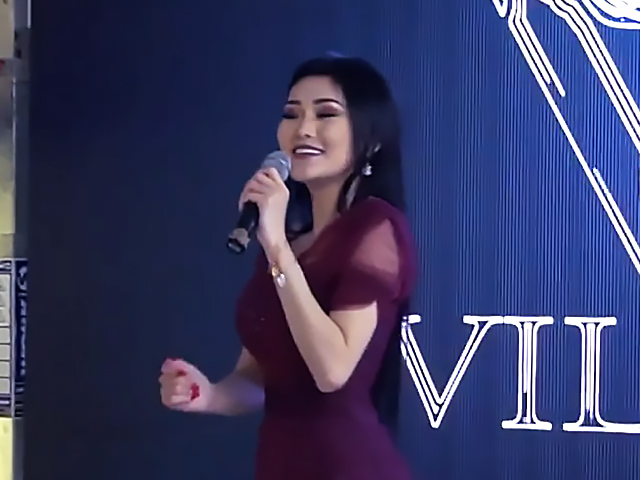
- Esmahan in 2018

Background information
- Born: Erke Abdrashkyzy Esmahan; 30 November 1984 (age 41); Yrgyz, Kazakh SSR, USSR
- Genres: Pop
- Occupations: Singer, actress
- Years active: 2009–present

Erke Abdrashkyzy Esmahan (Kazakh: Ерке Әбдірашқызы Есмахан; born 30 November 1984) is a Kazakhstani singer and actress. In 2009, she began performing as part of the group Inkar, but left the group in 2015 to pursue a solo career. In 2018, she played the lead role in her own film, "Mahabbat Cafe."

== Early life and education ==
Erke Abdrashkyzy Esmahan was born on 30 November 1984 in the village of Yrgyz in the Aktobe Region of the Kazakh SSR, in the family of the deputy head of the organizational department of the Yrgyz district committee of the CPSU (at that time) Abdrash Nurmakhanuly Esmakhan (5 December 1939 – 20 June 2020). She comes from the Tortkara clan of the Alimuly tribe.

Esmahan attended the Altynsarin School in Yrgyz until fifth grade, then continued her studies at a music school in Aktobe, taking lessons in dombra, kobyz, and piano. After graduating from high school, she entered the Akhmet Zhubanov Aktobe College of Music, where she studied classical opera. She then continued her studies at the pop and vocal department of the Kazakh National Academy of Arts.

== Career ==
After four years of study at the academy, Esmahan became a member of the girl group "Inkar", led by renowned Kazakh producer Bayan Yesentayeva (Alaguzova). The other members of the group, formed in 2009, were Malika Chegibaeva and Aida Zhantleuova. Esmahan currently maintains no relationship with her former producers, Bayan Alaguzova and Bagim Mukhitdenova.

Esmahan gained widespread recognition after the release of a music video for the song "Hello" with Töreğali Töreäli in 2015. The video received one million views on YouTube in 17 days and over 60 million views overall.

In 2017, the music video for the song "Qayda?" performed by Esmahan gained immense popularity among Kazakh and international audiences and became the most popular on Kazakhstan's YouTube channel. As of 2025, the video has received over 174 million views.

In 2018, Esmahan became the general producer of the romantic comedy "Mahabbat Cafe" (directed by Askar Uzabayev), in which she made her acting debut and played the lead role. Screenings of "Mahabbat Cafe" in Kazakhstani cinemas began on 25 October, and during its first weekend, the film collected 9.7 million tenge.

== Personal life ==
Esmahan was married to journalist Askhat Sadyrbay (producer and host of the once popular reality show "Shirkin, Life"), with whom she gave birth to a boy named Muslim. On 8 August 2011, Esmahan and Sadyrbay registered their marriage at the Auezov District Civil Registry Office in Almaty, submitting an application for marriage registration online. Thus, this marriage became the first in Kazakhstan to be registered online. Less than two years later, the couple divorced.

In early 2021, Esmahan's romantic relationship with former Ninety One member Azamat Zenkayev (known by his stage name AZ) became public. In November of that year, the singer announced their split. In December 2022, Erke Esmahan traveled to Paris, where she was later spotted with singer Raimbek Baktygereev, better known by his stage name RaiM. In January 2023, the couple married according to Muslim rites, confirming their marriage on their social media. In November of the same year, Esmahan gave birth to a son, who was named Islam, and in December 2024 it became known that she was pregnant for the third time. On 12 June 2025, she gave birth to a son, who was named Batyr.

== Discography ==
- 2015: Allo (with Toregali Toreali)
- 2017: Қайда? (Kaida?)
- 2017: Қыз арманы (Kiz aman)
- 2019: 1001 күн (1001 kun)
- 2021: Кел, кел (Kel, kel)
- 2022: Сен қыз (Sen kiz)

== Filmography ==
- 2018: Mahabbat Cafe
