= Eduard Kazarian =

Kazakhstani sculptor

- Born: 1964 (age 61–62); Almaty, Kazakh SSR, Soviet Union
- Known for: Sculpture, ceramics, tapestries

Eduard Kazarian (born 1964) is a Kazakhstani sculptor of Armenian descent whose works range from small bronzes to monumental public art. His materials include bronze, ceramics, and steel; he has also produced tapestries, graphic works, and designer jewelry. Since the early 1990s he has exhibited widely in Kazakhstan and abroad, and his sculptures are held in public and corporate collections internationally.

== Early life and education ==
Kazarian was born in Almaty in 1964. He studied sculpture at the Almaty State Theater and Art Institute (now the Kazakh National Academy of Arts), graduating in 1991.

== Career ==
Kazarian has presented numerous solo and group exhibitions in Kazakhstan and abroad. In 2019 the Abylkhan Kasteev State Museum of Arts in Almaty hosted his solo exhibition In the Artist's Studio, which featured bronze and ceramic works, monumental reliefs, and textile art.

That same year, he participated in the group exhibition Triumvirart at ForteBank Kulanshi ArtSpace in Astana (now Nur-Sultan), alongside fellow Kazakh artists Erbol Noda and Bakhytbek Bekeev.

His public commissions include a variety of sculptural installations in Kazakhstan and abroad. He is also active as a curator and cultural organizer, co-curating the First Eurasian Sculpture Biennale during the EXPO-2017 cultural program and founding the Kazarian Art Center in Almaty in 2015.

== Selected public and commissioned works ==
- Heart (2018–2019) – sculpture representing Kazakhstan in the Reviving Humanity Memorial, Sharm el-Sheikh, Egypt.
- The Beatles Bench (2007) – public sculpture on Kok-Tobe Hill, Almaty, commissioned by the Seimar Foundation.
- Mountain Guard (2020) – bronze installation at the Embassy of Kazakhstan in Paris, France.

== Collections ==
Kazarian's works are held by institutions such as the World Bank Art Program (Washington, D.C.) and by the Abylkhan Kasteev State Museum of Arts (Almaty). Additional holdings in museums and corporate collections in Kazakhstan and abroad have been reported in local media.

== Awards ==
- 2019 – Mädeniet salasynyn üzdigi ("Excellence in Culture") badge from the Ministry of Culture and Sports of the Republic of Kazakhstan.
- 2011 – Gold Medal of the Ministry of Culture of Armenia.
- 2012 – Altyn Adam – Person of the Year national award ("People's Love and Creative Achievements").
- 2000 – Tarlan independent award in culture ("New Name – Hope").

== Style and themes ==
Kazarian's works frequently explore the relationship between humanity, nature, and the cosmos. His preferred materials include bronze, ceramics, and steel, while his motifs often draw on mythological or archetypal imagery interpreted through contemporary forms.
