= Ashirbek Torebayuly Sygai =

Kazakhstani academic

Ashirbek Torebayuly Sygai (Kazakh: Әшірбек Төребайұлы Сығай, Äşırbek Törebaiūly Syğai) (January 1, 1947 – November 28, 2014) was a theater critic, translator, educator, and professor at the Kazakh National University of Arts.

== Life ==
Ahirbek Sygai was born in South Kazakhstan region.

== Legacy ==
Sygai authored several books, including "Іңкәр шақ" (1978), "Сыр сандық" (1981), "Сахнаға сапар" (1990), "Жарнама алдындағы ой" (1993), "Сахна саңлақтары" (1998), "Театр тағылымы" (2003), "Толғам" (2004), "Талдықорған театры" (2005).
