= Qajet Smağul =

Kazakh actor

- Қажет Смағұл
- Born: 20 June 1973 (age 52); Semipalatinsk Oblast, Kazakh SSR, Soviet Union
- Occupation(s): Theatre and film actor
- Years active: 2016–present

Qajet Smağul (Note: Often transliterated as Kazhet Smagulov through a Russified Romanization of Кажет Смагулов.) (Kazakh: Қажет Смағұл; born 20 June 1973) is a Kazakh theatre and film actor.

== Early life and education ==
Smağul was born on 20 June 1973. He has not received higher education. Since childhood, he dreamed of being a clown.

== Career ==
Smağul began his career as actor in Ülgili Malşy village, Kokpekti District, Semipalatinsk Oblast, and has done only acting ever since. In 2003, he moved to Astana.

Smağul's professional film debut came with the movie Kazakh Business (2016). He has played his character, Baqdäulet, on all its sequels, except the last two. Smağul does not label himself as a "professional actor", comparing himself to Jan Baijanbaev.

In April 2024, Smağul planned to become a film producer by presenting the concept for his new film, Mister Hoş Iıs. The screenplay was being written at the time, but its release was not certain.

== Controversies ==
In 2022, a feud began between Smağul and fellow performer Tursynbek Qabatov. Smağul, who won a million tenge in Qabatov's "Äzil Älemi" show, joked that Qabatov still owed him 300,000 tenge of the sum. Two years later, the relations between the two remained unresolved, and the two have not spoken since.

== Personal life ==
Smağul speaks Russian and Kazakh. He has mentioned not speaking any English, but learning some Swahili phrases from the filming of Kazakh Business in Africa.
