= Evgeny Zhumanov =

- Евгений Жұманов
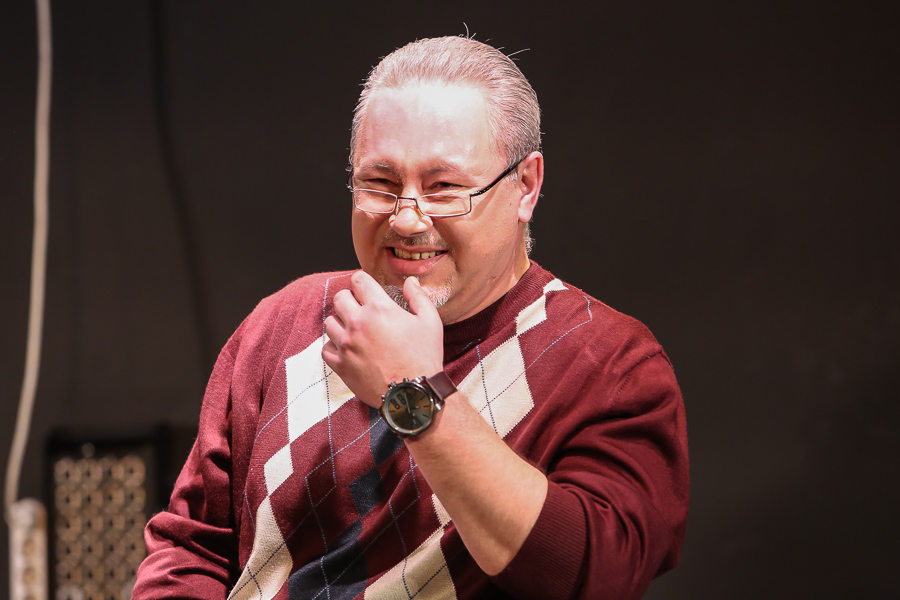
- Born: July 8, 1964 (age 60); Pavlodar, Kazakh SSR, USSR
- Occupation(s): actor, theater director, TV host
- Awards: Honored Worker of Kazakhstan

Evgeny Zhumanov (Kazakh: Евгений Жұманов, born July 9, 1964) is a Kazakhstani actor, director and TV presenter. Honored Worker of Kazakhstan.

== Biography ==
Evgeny Zhumanov was born in Pavlodar in 1964. He worked at Pavlodar Regional Drama Theater named after Chekhov, Lermontov Russian Drama Theatre.

In 2013, Evgeny Zhumanov graduated from the School of Theater, Movie and Television of the Kazakh National University of Arts.

For several years he ran the Kazakhstani franchise of Who Wants to Be a Millionaire?

== Filmography ==
Year	Title	Role	Notes
1996-2000	Crossroads (Kazakhstani TV series)	Shamil Bayzhanov	
2002	A Free Woman (Kazakhstani TV series)	Ruslan	
2003	Everyone Will Climb His Mt. Calvary	Spider	
2011	Doctor Akhmetova is Coming For You (Kazakhstani TV series)	Askar	
2012	Astana, My Heart	Pavel Salakhov	
2012	Classmates		
2013	The Story of an Old Woman	Ruslan Karimovich	

== Awards ==
- Laureate of the State Youth Prize Daryn;
- Honored Worker of Kazakhstan.
