= Lermontov Russian Drama Theatre =

Drama theatre

National Russian Drama Theatre named after M.Y. Lermontov
- The theatre in 2007
- Interactive map of National Russian Drama Theatre named after M.Y. Lermontov
- Former names: Russian Drama Theatre
- Address: Baiseitova st. 43; Almaty; Kazakhstan
- Coordinates: 43°14′35″N 76°56′39″E

Construction
- Opened: 1933

Website
- http://tl.kz/content/

Lermontov Russian Drama Theatre (Russian: Русский театр драмы имени М. Ю. Лермонтова, tr: Russkiy Teatr Dramy imeni M. Yu. Lermontova) is a drama theatre named after Russian poet and artist Mikhail Lermontov located in Almaty, Kazakhstan.

== History ==
The Russian Drama Theatre was opened in Almaty in 1933. Creation and formation of the theatre was done by Yury Rutkovsky, Zinaida Morskaya (Maksimova), Yevgeny Dyordiyev, Vladimir Zeldin who brought fame to the theatre.

The theatre was named after Mikhail Lermontov in 1964 – the year of the 150th anniversary of poet's birth. At the end of the 1970s, the theatre was acknowledged to be an academic theatre.

The theatre celebrated its 50th anniversary and its staff was awarded the Order of Friendship of Peoples in 1983.

Theatre staff were awarded the Certificate of Merit of the Culture Committee for their productive work in the development of theatrical art in 2000.

In 2006 the theatre was closed for major repairs. The theatre installed expensive stage lighting and sound equipment, modern air conditioning and heating systems. The restoration lasted almost three years and the theatre reopened its doors in December 2008.

According to the Decree of the President of the Republic of Kazakhstan Kassym-Jomart Tokayev the theatre was assigned the status ″National″ on 20 November 2020.

== Theater repertoire ==
Running performances

- 2003 - CHERCHEZ LA FEMME / SEARCHING FOR WOMAN, a comedy in three acts (Claude Magnier).
- 2006 - "№ 13" - comedy in two acts (Ray Cooney)
- 2010 - PAJAMAS FOR SIX - comedy in two acts (Marc Camoletti)
- 2014 - The Rainmaker (play) is a play in 3 acts by American playwright Nash, N. Richard.
- 2014 - The Inspector (comedy) - comedy in five acts by the Russian writer Gogol, Nikolai Vasilievich.
- 2014 - The Seagull (play) - a play in four acts by Chekhov, Anton Pavlovich
- 2015 - Dinner with a Fool - comedy in two acts (Francis Weber)
- 2017 - PHILUMENA - melodrama (Eduardo de Filippo)
- 2019 - "Gigi. Passion on the Côte d'Azur" - comedy (Michel Poli)
- 2019 - "OF MICE AND MEN" - drama (John Steinbeck)
- 2019 - "PRIMA DONNAS" - lyrical comedy in two acts (Ken Ludwig)
- 2019 - "SNOW MAIDEN. NOT a fairy tale" - fantasy in two acts (Alexander OSTROVSKY)
- 2020 - "The Widow's Steamboat" - drama (I. Grekova, Pavel Lungin)
- 2020 - "Wolves and Sheep" - comedy in two acts (Alexander Ostrovsky)
- 2020 - "ONCE UPON A TIME..." - lyrical comedy in two acts (Yermek Tursunov)
- 2020 - "MY PAPER PAN" - a play for adult children (Keren Klimovski)
- 2020 - "Autumn Sonata" - melodrama (Ingmar Bergman)

== Leading artists of the theater troupe ==
- Pomerantsev, Yuri Borisovich - Hero of Labor of Kazakhstan. People's Artist of the Kazakh SSR, winner of the State Prize of the RK
- Kapustin, Yuri Nikolaevich - Honoured Artist of the Republic of Kazakhstan, Laureate of State Prize of the RK.
- Lebsak Irina Maratovna - Honoured Artist of the Republic of Kazakhstan, Laureate of the State Prize of the RK.
- Balaev, Gennady Nikolaevich - Honoured Artist of the Republic of Kazakhstan.
- Banchenko, Tatyana Petrovna - Honoured Artist of the Republic of Kazakhstan.
- Grishko, Vitaly Alexeyevich - Honoured Artist of the Republic of Kazakhstan.
- Dolmatova, Natalia Valentinovna - Honoured Artist of the Republic of Kazakhstan.
- Zhmerenetskaya, Nina Leonidovna - Honoured Artist of the Republic of Kazakhstan.
- Anatoly Krejenchukov - Honoured Artist of the Republic of Kazakhstan.
- Zubov, Aleksandr Aleksandrovich - Honoured Artist of the Republic of Kazakhstan.
- Ufimtsev, Sergey Anatolievich - Honoured Worker of the Republic of Kazakhstan, Laureate of the State Prize of the Republic of Kazakhstan.
- Skirta, Dmitry Anatolievich - Honoured Artist of the Republic of Kazakhstan.
- Tokarev, Mikhail Mikhailovich - Honoured Artist of the Republic of Kazakhstan.
- Gantseva, Marina Yurievna - Honoured Artist of the Republic of Kazakhstan.
- Temkina, Anastasia Lvovna - Laureate of the "Serper" award.
- Evgeny Zhumanov - Laureate of the State Youth Prize Daryn.

== Theatre management ==
From 1983 to June 2020 – Ruben Andriasyan – the artistic director of the theatre.

Since July 2020 – Dmitry Anatolievich Skirta, Honored Artist of the Republic of Kazakhstan, became the artistic director of the theatre.

== Monumental status ==
A new State List of Historical and Cultural Monuments of Local Significance in Almaty was approved on 10 November 2010, which gave the theatre monumental status.
