= Avika Gor =

Indian actress (born 1997)

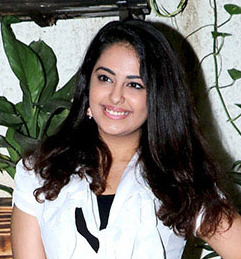
- Gor in 2020
- Born: 30 June 1997 (age 29); Mumbai, Maharashtra, India
- Occupations: Actress; producer; Model
- Years active: 2008–present
- Spouse: Milind Chandwani (m. 2025)

Avika Gor (pronounced [əˈʋiːka ɡoːɾ]; born 30 June 1997) is an Indian actress who primarily works in Hindi and Telugu films and television. Gor is best recognised for her portrayal of Anandi Singh in Balika Vadhu and Roli Dwivedi Bhardwaj in Sasural Simar Ka. She is a recipient of several accolades including four ITA Awards and one SIIMA Award. She also participated in the reality shows Khatron Ke Khiladi 9, Pati Patni Aur Panga – Jodiyon Ka Reality Check 𝘢𝘯𝘥 Khatron Ke Khiladi 15.

Following her work as a child artist on television, Gor made her film debut with the Hindi film Morning Walk (2009). She expanded to Telugu films with Uyyala Jampala (2013), for which she won the SIIMA Award for Best Female Debut – Telugu. Her other notable films include Cinema Choopistha Mava (2015), Care of Footpath 2 (2015), Ekkadiki Pothavu Chinnavada (2016), Raju Gari Gadhi 3 (2019), 1920: Horrors of the Heart (2023) and Shanmukha (2025).

== Early life ==
Gor was born on 30 June 1997, in a Gujarati family in Mumbai. She attended Sharon English High School in the Mulund suburb of Mumbai.

== Career ==
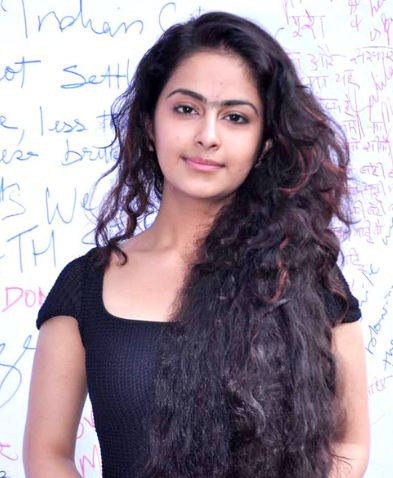
Gor in 2012

She made her Hindi television debut with Ssshhhh...Koi Hai in 2007. She made her film debut in Tollywood with Uyyala Jampala in 2013 and won SIIMA Award for Best Female Debut – Telugu.

In 2022, Gor made her debut in Kazakhstan with the Kazakh film Kazakh Business in India. She was also featured in the film's spin-off movie, I go to school.

In 2025, Gor played an investigative journalist in Shanmukha opposite Aadi Saikumar. A critic from 123telugu stated, "Avika is adequate in her role, and she looks appealing in the college sequences. Her chemistry with Aadi works to an extent." In the same year, she participated in the reality show, Pati Patni Aur Panga – Jodiyon Ka Reality Check along with her fiancee, Milind Chandwani.

After 8 years away from the fiction television, she entered StarPlus's Apsara in a cameo role as queen of Apsaras Maharani Meenakshi in October 2026.

== Personal life ==
Gor met social activist Milind Chandwani in 2019 and the couple began dating in 2020. Following a five year relationship, the couple got engaged in June 2025. On 30 September 2025, Gor married Chandwani on the sets of TV series Pati Patni Aur Panga – Jodiyon Ka Reality Check.

== Filmography ==
=== Films ===
Year	Title	Role	Language	Notes	Ref.
2009	Morning Walk	Gargi	Hindi	Child artist	
2010	Paathshala	Avika	Hindi	Child artist	
2012	Tezz	Piya Raina	Hindi	Child artist	
2013	Uyyala Jampala	Uma Devi	Telugu	credited as Avika	
2014	Lakshmi Raave Maa Intiki	Lakshmi Rao	Telugu		
2015	Cinema Choopistha Mava	Parineeta Chatterjee	Telugu		
2015	Thanu Nenu	Keerthi	Telugu		
2015	Care of Footpath 2	Geetha	Kannada	Bilingual film	
2015	Kill Them Young	Geetha	Hindi	Bilingual film	
2016	Ankahi Baatein	Unknown	Hindi	Short film	
2016	Ekkadiki Pothavu Chinnavada	Ayesha / Amala	Telugu		
2017	I, Me, Myself		Hindi	Short film; also writer	
2019	Natasaarvabhowma	Bride	Kannada	Special appearance in song "Tajaa Samcahara"	
2019	Raju Gari Gadhi 3	Maya	Telugu		
2021	Net	Priya	Telugu		
2021	Bro	Subhadra "Subbu"	Telugu		
2022	10th Class Diaries	Chandini	Telugu		
2022	Thank You	Sravani "Chinnu" Reddy	Telugu		
2022	Kazakh Business in India	Avika	Kazakh		
2022	Kahani Rubberband Ki	Kavya	Hindi		
2023	Popcorn	Sameerana	Telugu	Also producer	
2023	1920: Horrors of the Heart	Meghana	Hindi		
2023	Umapathi	Uma	Telugu		
2023	I go to school		Kazakh		
2024	Bloody Ishq	Neha	Hindi		
2025	Shanmukha	Sara Maheswaran	Telugu		
2026	Ugly Story	Neha	Telugu		

=== Television ===
Year	Title	Role	Language	Notes	Ref.
2008	Raajkumar Aaryyan	Young Rajkumari Bhairavi	Hindi		
2008	Ssshhhh... Phir Koi Hai	Little girl in Rachit's dream	Hindi		
2008–2010	Balika Vadhu	Young Anandi Singh	Hindi		
2011–2016	Sasural Simar Ka	Roli Dwivedi Bhardwaj	Hindi		
2017–18	Laado – Veerpur Ki Mardani	Anushka Sangwan Choudhary	Hindi		
2019	Khatra Khatra Khatra	Herself	Hindi		
2019	Fear Factor: Khatron Ke Khiladi 9	Contestant	Hindi	12th place	
2023	Mansion 24	Swapna	Telugu		
2023	Vadhuvu	Anjuri Indu	Telugu		
2025	Pati Patni Aur Panga	Contestant	Hindi	6th place	
2026	Khatron Ke Khiladi 15	Contestant	Hindi	12th place	
2026	Apsara	Apsara Maharani Meenakshi	Hindi	Cameo	

=== Music videos ===
Year	Title	Singer(s)	Ref.
2019	"Doggy"	Ishaan Khan	
2021	"Dil Ko Mere"	Rahul Jain	
2021	"Qurbaan"	Stebin Ben, Asad Khan	
2024	"Ladki Tu Kamaal Ki"	Andre Russell, Palak Muchhal	
2026	"Bhukhaar"	Vicky Sandhu	

== Awards and nominations ==
Year	Award Ceremony	Category	Work	Result	Ref.
2008	8th Indian Television Academy Awards	Best Child Artist	Balika Vadhu	Won	
2008	8th Indian Television Academy Awards	Best Actress – Drama (Jury)	Balika Vadhu	Won	
2009	9th Indian Television Academy Awards	Best Child Artist	Balika Vadhu	Won	
2010	10th Indian Television Academy Awards	Best Child Artist	Balika Vadhu	Won	
2014	3rd South Indian International Movie Awards	Best Female Debut – Telugu	Uyyala Jampala	Won	

== See also ==
- List of Indian television actresses
- List of Hindi television actresses
- List of Telugu film actresses
