= Kazakh Business (film series) =

Kazakh film series

- Created by: Nurlan Koyanbayev
- Original work: Kazakh Business (2016)

Films and television
- Film(s): Kazakh Business; Kazakh Business in America; Kazakh Business in Africa; Kazakh Business in Korea; Kazakh Business in Turkey; Kazakh Business in India; Kazakh Business in Brazil

Kazakh Business (Russian: Бизнес по-казахски, Kazakh: Қазақша бизнес) is a Kazakh film series. Centered around the fictional character Jomart Baltabayev's hotel business, it started with the eponymous 2016 comedy movie Kazakh Business.

In 2017, the original movie's sequel, Kazakh Business in America was made. Several sequels set in various locations followed: Kazakh Business in Africa (2018), Kazakh Business in Korea (2019), Kazakh Business in Turkey (2021), Kazakh Business in India (2022), Kazakh Business in Brazil (2023). In March 2022, a movie based on the misadventures of main character Erkoş was made, titled I go to school.

Kazakh Business is the highest-grossing film series in Kazakhstan.

== Plot ==
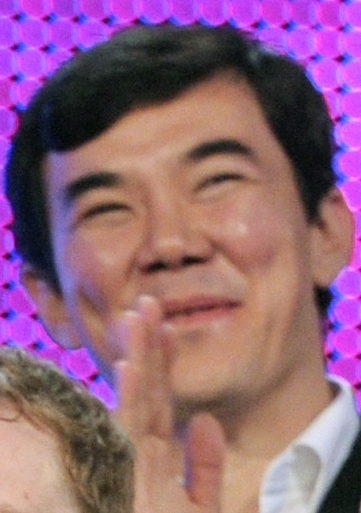
Kazakh comedian and actor Nurlan Koyanbayev is both creator and main actor of the Kazakh Business series

The plot of the first movie, and by its extension its sequels, revolves around Jomart Kanatovich Baltabaev, (Note: In this name that follows East Slavic naming customs, the patronymic is Kanatovich and the family name is Baltabaev.) a hotel owner, the employees of whom leave right when he expects a visit by foreign investors. He then resorts to hiring his relatives instead. The relatives, shown to be from the auyl, behave in an unprofessional way, and Erkoş, part of the main cast, keeps getting lost in the different countries that the characters visit.

== Films ==
The first movie, which would go on to become the main installation in the series, Kazakh Business, was released in 2016. Despite being director and comedian Nurlan Koyanbayev's first movie, it collected 299,700,700 tenge in the box office, becoming a massive success. Among its cast was Jan Baijanbaev, Gülnaz Jolanova, singer Töreğali Töreäli, and Bollywood star Sidharth Shukla.

A sequel, Kazakh Business in America, was released next year and gained 581 million tenge. The filming took place in both Almaty and Los Angeles. The similarly-titled next movie, which was now set in Africa, received 772,386,445 tenge.

Kazakh Business in Korea, which was set in both South Korea and North Korea, and was released in 2020, was the most successful Kazakh movie in all of the history of Kazakhstan by box office, having already collected more than 919 million tenge in its first month of release. Later, it became the first Kazakh movie to earn a billion tenge. Actor Jan Baijanbaev credited it to the feel-good writing, the professionalism of the cast, the "interesting themes", and the humour.

The 2021 sequel Kazakh Business in Turkey, the budget of which was reported as either 52 million or 500 million tenge, has received 1.19 billion tenge in the box office. Its sequel Kazakh Business in India, which was published next year, has collected 1.28 billion.

The 2023 addition to the series, Kazakh Business in Brazil, which was set in Brazil, gained 1 billion tenge.

== Criticism ==
When re-evaluating Kazakh Business in Brazil (2023) and the series in general, film researcher and journalist Äsia Bağdäuletqyzy commented that the movies "continue earning money by promoting stereotypes" about foreign nations, and criticised the plot of the new movie as being once again misogynistic, displaying the wives of the main characters as nagging and overly emotional, while the "batyr" men forgive them once more.

People's Artiste of Kazakhstan, holder of the USSR State Prize, and actor Nurjuman Yqtymbaev harshly criticised the series, refusing to call it "comedy", saying the "fine actors" in it cannot "open up" because of the "bogus writing".
