= Tursynbek Qabatov =

Kazakh comedian and actor

- Тұрсынбек Қабатов
- Born: 10 October 1979 (age 46); Aqpäter, Kaztal District, West Kazakhstan Region, Kazakh SSR, Soviet Union
- Education: Kazakh Agro Technical University
- Spouse: Möldir Mūqanova (m. 2003; sep. 2025)

Comedy career
- Years active: 2001–present
- Genres: Observational; satirical; ethnic; storytelling; improvisation
- Subjects: Everyday life; human behavior; family; gender differences; current events

Tūrsynbek Amanğaliūly Qabatov (Note: Often transliterated as Tursynbek Amangaliyevich Kabatov through a Russified Romanization of Турсынбек Амангалиевич Кабатов.) (Kazakh: Тұрсынбек Аманғалиұлы Қабатов; born 10 October 1979) is a Kazakh comedian, actor, and media personality. Previously known for his work as a KVN comedian, he later started performing independently.

== Early life ==
Qabatov was born on 10 October 1979 in the Aqpäter village of the Kaztal District, West Kazakhstan Region, Soviet Kazakhstan. His parents were kolkhoz people. His mother, Taliga, currently still resides in the village, and his father died in 2012.

Qabatov hails from the Begimbet branch of the Qipchaq tribe from the Middle jüz. His mother was from the Qaraqoily tribe, which makes him maternally related to fellow comedian Nurlan Koyanbayev. He did not grew up shy and quiet, until his school class was assigned a new teacher, Gülniazat. After school, Qabatov studied at Kazakh Agro Technical University in Astana.

== Career ==
During his university studies, he started his KVN career as "Agrarka sarbazdary" ("Soldiers of the Agrarian") student team captain. Afterwards, he became a member of the Kazakh national teams "Astana.kz" and "KaZakhs". He has thus performed in Sochi and at the KVN Supreme League.

During his KVN years, Qabatov struggled with publicly speaking Russian. His accent later became his signature feature, as well as his female roles. In 2010, he became best player of the season.

After his success at KVN, he opened two theatres, "Bazaq Joq" and "Äzil Älemi" in 2011, and in 2018, opened the first comedy and satire theatre in Astana. Later, he became a TV show host of the shows "KTK-da Qabatov" and "Good evening, Kazakhstan!".

In January 2023, Qabatov was appointed creative producer of the Khabar Agency.

== Controversies ==
In 2021, it was reported that Qabatov's daughter was caught cheating at the Unified National Testing (ŪBT) exam by switching places with another girl. He later clarified not being aware of the plan beforehand.

In June 2025, Qabatov was arrested and taken to court for vandalism. Before this, a drunken Qabatov started a feud onboard of an airplane, where he cursed at airline employees.

== Personal life ==
During his studies in Astana, Qabatov met dombrist, economist, and fellow student Möldir Mūqanova. They got married in 2003, and have five children: three daughters and two sons. Mūqanova leads an arts school opened by Qabatov. In 2021, their daughter, Ädemi, graduated school.

In June 2025, rumors have surfaced that Qabatov has obtained a second wife. It was said that she was born in 1997, in Besaryq, Syrdariya District, Kyzylorda Region, and that they share a son. Qabatov's official wife, Möldir Mūqanova, has confirmed the rumors, saying that "you can't hide anything from the people anymore these days", and refused to confirm whether or not they divorced.

=== Health problems ===
During an Astana jubilee concert on 6 July 2025, Qabatov revealed going through a craniotomy operation.

== Awards and honors ==
Qabatov was named Honored Artist of Kazakhstan in 2015.
