= Crossroads (Kazakhstani TV series) =

- Genre: soap opera
- Written by: Leyla Akhinzhanova; Elena Gordeeva; Albina Akhmetova; Mikhail Belyakov
- Directed by: Aibarsha Bozheeva; Andrey Marmontov; Elena Prokoptseva; Vladimir Tyulkin; Ermek Shinarbaev; Bagdad Mustafin
- Country of origin: Kazakhstan
- Original language: Russian
- No. of episodes: 465

Production
- Producers: Abay Karpykov; Kalykbek Salykov
- Running time: 25 minutes
- Production companies: Portabello Pictures, Kazakhfilm

Original release
- Network: Khabar TV
- Release: April 11, 1996 – 2000

Crossroads (Russian: Перекресток, romanized: Perekryostok) was a Kazakhstani soap opera that ran from 1996 to 2000. It was the first soap opera produced in Kazakhstan. It became the most popular TV program in Central Asia, reportedly reaching 60 million homes in four countries: Russia, Uzbekistan, China and Kazakhstan. It is still unmatched in viewership and duration among Kazakhstani TV shows. The show was funded by a British government program to transfer knowledge to countries in the former Soviet Union and to promote the transition to a market economy.

The story line revolves around two families, the working-class Kazakh Umarovs and the professional-class Russian Platonovs. Their families are joined through marriage of the Umarovs' daughter to the Platonovs' son.

It was recognized as the best series of 1998 at the CIS media forum. A sequel to the series titled Crossroads in Astana started in 2015 on Khabar TV, the same station that aired the original.

== Cast ==
- Biken Rimova as Gulbibi
- Kasym Zhakibayev as Aplaton
- Vladimir Tolokonnikov as Pasha
- Gaziza Abdinabiyeva as Roza
- Yuriy Kapustin as Georgiy
- Nina Zhmerenetskaya as Valentina
- Sagi Ashimov as Timur
- Gulnara Dusmatova as Gaukhar
- Evgeny Zhumanov as Shamil
- Bakhitzhan Alpeisov as Sherkhan
- Venera Nigmatulina as Madina
- Irina Azhmukhamedova as Kamila
- Anatoli Krezhenchukov as Andrey
- Aleksey Shemes as Gleb
- Grigoriy Efimov as Igor
- Jan Baijanbaev

== Production ==
The show began life as an initiative of the British government's Thatcher-era Know-How Fund, established in 1989. The Fund's charter was to aid command-driven socialist societies' transition to free-market economies after the fall of the Soviet Union. In November 1992, the organization created the Marshall Plan for the Mind (MPM), named after the American plan to aid Western Europe rebuild after World War II. Crossroads was one of dozens of radio and TV programs the MPM funded in the former Soviet Union. It was conceived as an elaboration of an MPM radio soap opera in Russia, Dom Sem’ Pod’ezd Chetyre (Apartment 7, Entrance 4). That show was based on the long-running British TV radio soap The Archers, which had been an enormous success.

Portobello Media, a private London-based production company, was chosen to co-produce the series with KazakhFilm at the latter's studios in Almaty. The show was intended to be a British-style social realist soap opera modeled on EastEnders, an extremely successful British soap about a working-class family in the East End of London. The Know-How Fund spent $2.25 million to produce the first 12 episodes. (Several British brands such as Lucky Strike, Wrigley's Gum, and Smirnoff vodka also paid for product placement.) The funds paid for both Kazakhstani staff and experienced British soap opera consultants to train them. The consultants were set builders, set designers, scriptwriters, and editors, among others. The scripts were to depict the goings-on of a market economy, "incorporating issues such as privatization, banking, entrepreneurship, and market reform into the story lines". Most of the scripts were to be filmed in privately owned enterprises and one of the main characters ran a small cafe.

At the outset, the project attracted the attention of Almaty's writers, actors, and artists. It promised prestige and high wages in the post-Soviet era, when jobs were hard to come by. After joining, the Kazakhstanis were "trained in costumes, makeup, props, sound, production, lighting, directing, film editing, acting, assisting, and cost accounting". The writers were introduced to staples of British soap opera such as the "cliff-hanger, story-lining, narrative, [and] open-endedness". After a few months, the British chose who they thought were the best writers and let the rest of them go. Those who did not make the cut were often resentful, with at least one writer penning a scathing indictment of the production in a magazine, alleging corruption and incompetence.

During the training period, the writers and their trainers conflicted over the representation of Kazakh characters (the Kazakh writers resented that the Russian Platonovs were doctors, representing respectability, whereas the Kazakh Umarovs were working-class and folksy); whether intermarriage between Kazakhs and Russians could work (the British arranged several inter-marriages between characters to promote inter-ethnic harmony, but the Kazakhstani writers ensured the mixed marriages had extensive marital problems, believing that such marriages could not work); choice of characters (the Kazakh writers added a detective character after the British left); the content appropriate for a soap opera (some writers resented writing for a soap opera, which they considered to be a lowly form, and one writer even tried to put in a character reading Nietzsche); and how much historical consistency mattered (the Kazakh writers thought the viewers would not notice inconsistencies). Some Kazakhstani actors were frustrated by the open-ended nature of soap opera scripts and demanded to know "the ending".

In later years, the show was increasingly influenced by government policy and censors. The state instructed writers to stress issues like trading in Soviet passports for Kazakh ones, the virtues of moderate Islam, and the importance of moving the country's capital.

A documentary entitled East of Eastenders, produced by independent filmmaker Jemma Jupp, followed the creation of the show and aired on BBC World and in the UK in July 1997. It follows the making of the show, focusing on the culture clashes between the British writers and producers and their Kazakhstani counterparts.
