= Ramazan Amantai =

Kazakh actor

- Рамазан Амантай
- Born: 28 December 1998 (age 27); Talgar, Almaty Region, Kazakhstan
- Education: Al-Farabi Kazakh National University
- Occupations: Actor; film director; composer; poet; dubbing writer
- Spouse: Gülfaru Tölen (m. 2021)

Ramazan Bolatūly Amantai (sometimes transliterated Amantay, Kazakh: Рамазан Болатұлы Амантай; born 28 December 1998) is a Kazakh film actor, filmmaker, composer, and poet. He is best known for portraying Erkoş in the Kazakh Business movie franchise.

== Early life and education ==
Amantai was born on 28 December 1998 in Talgar, Almaty Region. His father, Bolat, is an economist, while his mother Roza Esbosynova is a kuishi and a dombrist, who studied at the Kazakh National Conservatory. Amantai has one younger sister and two younger brothers. He has said that he dreamed of studying in the Jürgenov Kazakh National Academy of Arts, but was not accepted due to unspecified "unfair" circumstances.

Since third grade, Amantai has played the dombra, and performed at international competitions. As of January 2019, he was studying at the Al-Farabi Kazakh National University to become a librarian.

== Career ==
As remembered by Amantai himself, he began his acting career at his father's request, but never regretted the decision. After finishing his school, Amantai went to a casting, and his debut was in the Ainalaiyn (2011) series.

Amantai described his acting experience as Erkoş in Kazakh Business in America (2017) "life-changing", and went on to reprise the role in the later sequels. Amantai's first main role in film was of Erkoş, in the Erkoş-based spinoff movie I Go to School.

In addition to acting, Amantai is a film director. In January 2025, his third full-length movie, Mädi in China, was published.

Outside film, Amantai is also a song and dubbing writer. He, for example, has written song lyrics performed by Töreğali Töreäli. In a 2023 interview to the Khabar Agency, he stated that he wrote approximately 400 songs in the last seven years. Though "half of them are not published, and the other are not that good", he requires only fifteen minutes to write one.

== Personal life ==
Amantai is an avid reader. He has stated that his dream role in acting has always been Abai Qunanbaiuly.

In March 2021, Amantai married Gülfaru Tölen. In July 2021, he revealed that they met at Toi Duman Radio.

In August 2025, Amantai announced that his weight has reached 158.5 kilograms (349 lb). Having said that he gained 88 kilograms (194 lb) in the last ten years, he announced his weight-loss journey due to health concerns.
