= Töreğali Töreäli =

Kazakh former singer

Töreğali Töreäli Төреғали Төреәлі
- Born: Töreğali Töreäliūly Älihanov; 14 October 1992 (age 33); Baikonur, Kyzylorda Region, Kazakhstan
- Genres: Toi-pop; rap
- Years active: 2010–2025
- Spouse: Tolqyn Tūrarbekqyzy (m. 2017)

Töreğali Töreäliūly Älihanov (Note: In this name that follows East Slavic naming customs, the patronymic is Töreäliūly and the family name is Älihanov.) (Kazakh: Төреғали Төреәліұлы Әлиханов), better known professionally as Töreğali Töreäli (Kazakh: Төреғали Төреәлі; born on 14 October 1992), is a Kazakh former toi music singer and former rapper. His genre was often described as toi-pop.

Töreğali is sometimes known by his alias "Ūly dala balasy" ("Son of the Great Steppe").

== Early life and education ==
Töreğali was born on 14 October 1992 in Baikonur. He studied at the Kazakh National Academy of Arts in Almaty, becoming an actor.

== Career ==
Töreğali started his career as an aytysker.

Töreğali gained prominence as singer in 2015 from his song "Allo" ("Hello"), which was a duo performance with Erke Esmahan.

For his song "Birtürli qyz" ("An Unusual Girl"), Töreğali received the republic-wide award "Jyl Tañdauy" ("Choice of the Year") in 2016. In 2017, he won the "Star Fight" against Kairat Nurtas.

On 14 October 2018, Töreğali's own full-length movie, Ūly dala komediasy ("The Comedy of the Great Steppe") was published.

In June 2025, he announced the end of his career due to familial reasons.

== Personal life ==
Töreğali married Almaty Region local Tolqyn Tūrarbekqyzy on 17 October 2017 in the Rixos Almaty hotel. They, however, had been together for three years, and already had two children at the moment of the ceremony. In an interview, she revealed that she studied at Al-Farabi Kazakh National University, lived in Almaty, and was an orientalist by profession. In 2024, their sixth child was born.
