= Gülnaz Jolanova =

Kazakh actress

- Гүлназ Жоланова
- Born: Gulnaz Zholanova; 12 November 1993 (age 32); Aktau, Mangystau Region, Kazakh SSR, Soviet Union
- Education: Al-Farabi Kazakh National University
- Occupations: Actress; dancer; model; TV presenter
- Height: 169 cm (5 ft 7 in)
- Children: 1

Gülnaz Jolanova (Note: Often transliterated as Gulnaz Zholanova through a Russified Romanization of Гульназ Жоланова.) (Kazakh: Гүлназ Жоланова, born 12 November 1993) is a Kazakh actress, dancer, promotional model, and television personality.

== Early life and education ==
Jolanova was born on 12 November 1993 in Aktau. She was raised by a single mother, and attended the Aktau economic lyseum. At age 17, she moved to Astana to pursue her education.

She studied in the Journalism Department of the Al-Farabi Kazakh National University, to become a tourism manager.

== Career ==
In the second semester of her studies in Al-Farabi National University, she took up dancing, and started teaching it for a living. She later went on to compete, and won in different competitions, including in Russia (2006), Czechia (2008), Austria (2008), Macedonia (2009), and Armenia (2010).

Jolanova's film debut came with her being cast in the series The Love is Always in My Heart (2015–2016). Her character there, Kämşat, earned her recognition as an actress.

Jolanova is known for playing roles in such projects, as the movies Taraz (2016), Elevator (2018), Akim (2019), the series Hi, I am Nurlan Koyanbayev (2021), and the film franchise Kazakh Business (2016–present).

She was named "Miss Kazakhstan 2014".

== Personal life ==
Jolanova is, as reported by Zharar, 169 centimetres (67 in) tall. She does equestrianism and fencing as a hobby, and speaks Kazakh, Russian, English, and Turkish.

In February 2023, Jolanova got married. Her husband (born c. 1991) is not a public figure or even a person of arts, and his name is not publicly disclosed. He is a son of a known entrepreneur and restaurant owner Muhtar Toibazarov. In August 2023, they had a child.
