= Kazakh National Academy of Arts =

Coordinates: 43°15′6.5″N 76°56′40.3″E

T.K. Zhurgenov Kazakh National Academy of Arts
- Т. Қ. Жүргенов атындағы Қазақ ұлттық өнер академиясы
- Type: National
- Established: 1978
- Rector: Azamat Satybaldy
- Location: 127 Panfilov Street, Almaty, Kazakhstan
- Campus: urban
- Website: kaznai.kz

The T.K. Zhurgenov Kazakh National Academy of Arts (Kazakh: Т. Қ. Жүргенов атындағы Қазақ ұлттық өнер академиясы, T. Q. Jürgenov atyndağy Qazaq ūlttyq öner akademiasy; abbr. KazNAA) is the main theatre, film, drama, and fine arts and design school in Almaty, Kazakhstan. The Academy began as the theatrical faculty of the Kurmangazy Institute of Arts, known today as the Kazakh National Conservatory, in 1955. It was named after the Communist Party official Temirbek Zhurgenov (1898-1938) in 1989.

At the Academy of Arts. T.K. Zhurgenova runs a student television studio, which is an important educational platform for developing students' creativity and demonstrating the result of their work in public.

The Academy carries out work on the international educational programs Erasmus+, Mevlana and DAAD.

== History ==
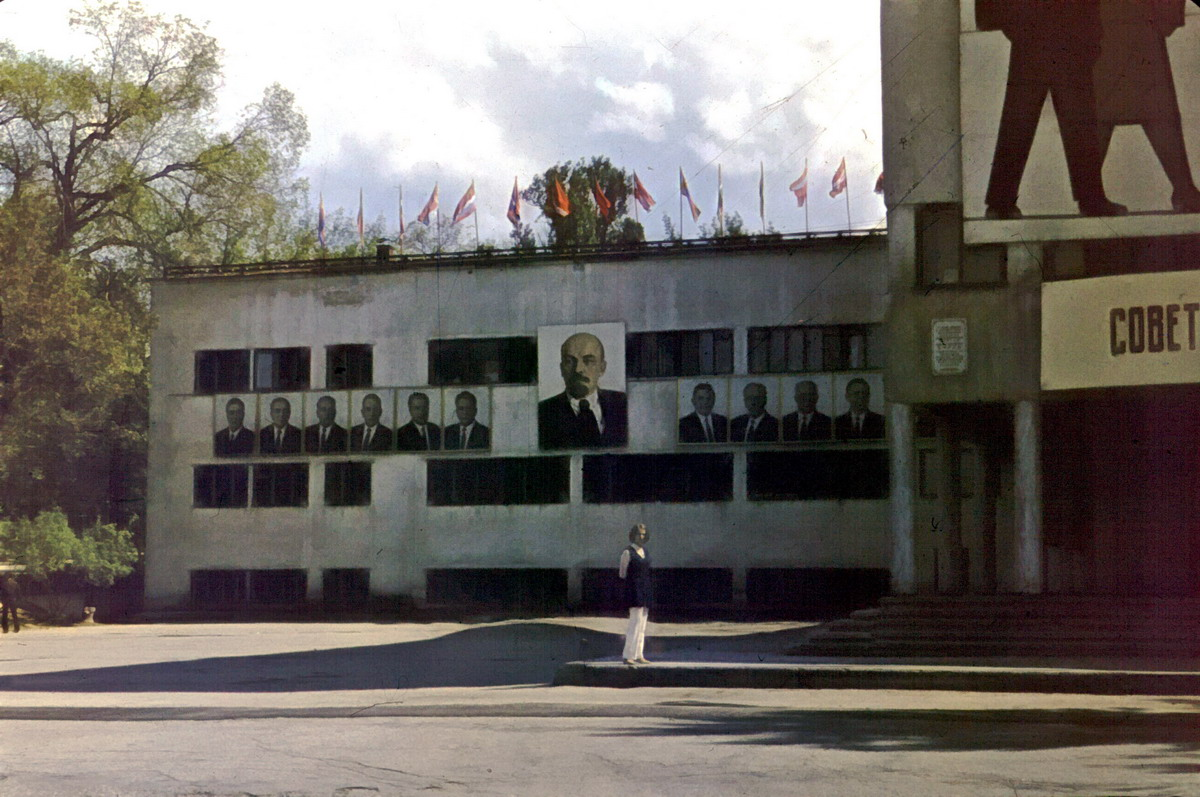
Building of the educational building of the Kirov Kazakh State University (1969)

The history of the Academy goes back to 1955, when the People's Artist of the Kazakh SSR, A.T. Tokpanov, opened the Theater Department at the Kurmangazy State Conservatory of Alma-Ata. In 1977, this grew into the Alma-Ata Theatrical Art Institute. In 1978 the first students were admitted to the theatre and art faculties.

In the academic year 1982-1983, the institute had 490 students and 95 teachers, including 5 professors and doctors of sciences, 7 associate professors and candidates of sciences.

On January 28, 1989 the institute was named after the first People's Commissar for Education of Kazakhstan, Temirbek Karayevich Zhurgenov.

In 1993 the university was reorganized into the Zhurgenov Kazakh State Institute of Theatre and Cinema, and the Faculty of Cinema and TV was organized. On June 22, 1994 the Zhurgenov Higher school of Choreography at KazGITC was founded, which was subsequently transformed into the Faculty of Choreography.

In 2000, through the merger of the Zhurgenov Kazakh State Institute of Theater and Cinema and the Kazakh State Academy of Art, the Zhurgenov Kazakh State Academy of Arts was established.

On July 5, 2001, through a decree of the Kazakh president Nazarbayev, the Academy was given a special status as "national university".

== Faculties ==
- Theater arts
- Musical art
- Choreography
- Film, TV, and Art History
- Variety Art
- Painting, Sculpture, Design and Applied Art

== Student telestudio ==
The Zhurgenov Academy of Arts has a student television studio, which is intended as an educational platform to develop students' abilities to create and show their work publicly.

== Rectors ==
- 1975-1985 - G.A. Dzhanysbaeva
- 1987-1989 - Aman Kulbayev
- 1989-1991 - Ashirbek Sygay
- 1991-1994 - Esmukhan Obayev
- 1994-2000 - Ibragimov U.Sh.
- 2000-2008 - Kishkashbaev T.A.
- 2008-2014 - Arystanbek Mukhamediuly
- 2014-2018 - Bibigul Nusipzhanova
- 2018-2019 - Askhat Maemirov
- 2019-2021 - Akan Abdualiev
- 2021-2022 - Sharipbek Amirbek
- 2022-present - Azamat Satybaldy

== Academy building ==
After the transfer of the capital of the Kazakh SSR from Kyzylorda to Alma-Ata, it became necessary to build a new administrative center for state institutions. Therefore, the construction of a building for the Sovnarkom of the Kazakh SSR (situated along Kirov Street, now Bogenbai Batyr Street) was carried out in 1927-1931. The architects of the project were Moisei Ginzburg and Ignaty Milinis; the engineer was V. Orlovsky. The constructivist design of the building won the All-Union Competition of the Moscow Architectural Society.

The building was occupied by Levon Mirzoyan, First Secretary of the Central Committee of the Communist Party of Kazakhstan.

In 1941 the building was reconstructed by architects B. Dergachev, G. Kushnarenko and engineer N. Orazmybetov, as a result of which the wings were completed and the roof was replaced.

After the construction of a new government building in 1958, the structure was transferred to the Sergei Kirov Kazakh State University. During this period, there was a monument to Kirov in the vestibule of the academic building.

In 1982, the building housed the Theatre and Art Institute, which later was renamed to the Zhurgenov Almaty Institute of Theater and Cinematography.
