= Nurlan Koyanbayev =

Kazakh actor, filmmaker, and television personality

- Нұрлан Қоянбаев
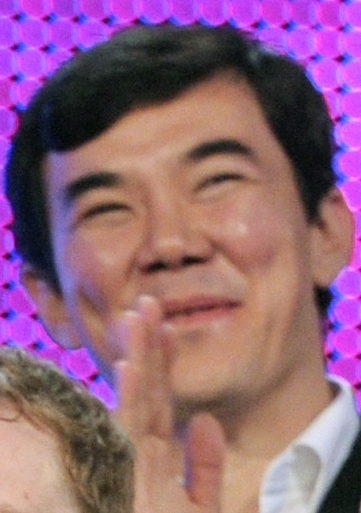
- Koyanbayev in 2011
- Born: July 19, 1979 (age 47); Shieli, Kzyl-Orda Region, Kazakh SSR, Soviet Union
- Education: Al-Farabi Kazakh National University
- Occupations: TV presenter; actor; filmmaker; comedian
- Notable work: Kazakh Business franchise Tüngi Studia

Member of the National Kurultai
- In office 14 June 2022 – 1 March 2025
- President: Kassym-Jomart Tokayev

Nūrlan Nūğmanūly Qoianbaev (Note: Often transliterated as Nurlan Koyanbayev through a Russified Romanization of Нурлан Коянбаев.) (Kazakh: Нұрлан Нұғманұлы Қоянбаев; born 19 July 1979) is a Kazakh filmmaker, television personality, and actor. Known previously for his work in KVN, Koyanbayev later became famous for his directing and acting work. His notable works include the Kazakh Business comedy film franchise.

== Early life and education ==
Koyanbayev was born on July 19, 1979, in Kyzylorda Region.

He studied at Al-Farabi Kazakh National University from 1996 to 2000, studying history. Koyanbayev would go on to study in the finances and pension faculty of the Economics and Law Academy from 2009 to 2011. From next year to 2015, he was studying international relations at Al-Farabi Kazakh National University, getting a master's degree.

== Career ==
=== KVN comedian ===
As student, Koyanbayev rose to fame through his comedic work at KVN. At some point, he was named best KVN comedian in both Kazakhstan and Russia.

=== Television ===
After his KVN career, Koyanbayev moved on to television. There, he began hosting various television shows.

Koyanbayev was known on national television as late-night TV host of the Tüngi Studia (Night Studio) programme, which he started hosting in 2013. There, he got to interview President of Kazakhstan Nursultan Nazarbayev, among others. The programme continued its airing in 2022 after a 5-year absence. It started being shown on the Jibek Joly TV television channel.

From February 2017 to April 2022, Koyanbayev was the main director of the Qazaqstan Republic TV and Radio Corporation.

=== Filmmaking ===
In 2016, Koyanbayev filmed the movie Kazakh Business, his first full-length picture. The film later turned into the eponymous movie franchise, and its next sequel Kazakh Business in America (2017) earned more than 500 million tenge in the box office.

== In politics ==
In April 2022, Koyanbayev was appointed as creative director to the Television and Radio Complex of the President of Kazakhstan Kassym-Jomart Tokayev. In June of the same year, he became a member of the National Kurultai under Tokayev. He was removed from the position in March 2025.

On July 1, 2024, Koyanbayev was appointed by äkim of Turkestan Region Darhan Satybaldy as his Non-Staff Advisor regarding the Development of the Creative Industry.

== Personal life ==
Koyanbayev speaks both Russian and Kazakh. He is married to Aigerim Koyanbayeva.

In an interview to the Jas Alaş newspaper in November 1999, Koyanbayev says that his ultimate dream is to be President of Kazakhstan.

== Awards and honors ==
- Medal of Charity (2021)
