= Jan Baijanbaev =

Kazakh actor

- Жан Байжанбаев
- Born: Zhanat Anuarbekovich Aukenov; 5 August 1961 (age 65); Almaty, Kazakh SSR, Soviet Union
- Education: Jürgenov Almaty State Theatre-Arts Institute (1982)
- Occupations: Theatre actor; movie actor
- Years active: 1982–present
- Political party: CPSU (c. 1983–1991)
- Spouse: Gülnar Baijanbaeva (m. 1982)
- Children: 2

Janat Änuarbekūly Baijanbaev (Note: Often transliterated as Zhanat Anuarbekovich Baizhanbayev through a Russified Romanization of Жанат Ануарбекович Байжанбаев.) (né Aukenov; Kazakh: Жанат Әнуарбекұлы Байжанбаев, born 5 August 1961), better known professionally as Jan Baijanbaev (Note: Often transliterated as Zhan Baizhanbayev through a Russified Romanization of Жан Байжанбаев.) (Kazakh: Жан Байжанбаев), is a Kazakh theatre and movie actor, who's titled Honored Worker of Kazakhstan since 2005.

Baijambaev is known for starring in the following projects: Crossroads (1996–2000), Armavir (1991), Akim (2019), and the Kazakh Business (2016–present) franchise.

== Early life and education ==
Jan Baijanbaev was born Janat Aukenov in Almaty on 5 August 1961. His father, Änuarbek Aukenov, worked as a narrator at Central Radio and Television. He died when Jan was only 40 days old, and Jan thus took his mother's surname. His mother, Güljauhar Baijanbaeva, worked for the "Socialist Kazakhstan" newspaper.

In 1982, Baijanbaev finished his studies at the Actors Department of Jürgenov Almaty State Theatre-Arts Institute, becoming a theatre and movie actor. He studied alongside actor Sagi Ashimov.

Three weeks after marriage, Baijanbaev was taken to serve in the Soviet Army. He served in Siberia, at Sosnovoborsk, Krasnoyarsk Krai. He became member of the CPSU at age 22.

== Career ==
Baijanbaev's on-screen debut was when he was only 16 years old.

Since finishing his studies in 1982, Baijanbaev has been an actor at the Kazakhfilm film studio. From 2002 to 2004, he led its Actors Department.

In 1987, Baijanbaev became member of the USSR Cinematographists' Union. In 2005, he was named Honored Worker of Kazakhstan.

He is colloquially called the "Kazakh Alain Delon".

== Personal life ==
Baijanbaev is married to former model Gülnar Baijanbaeva (born 1959). They have two daughters, Dilyara (born 1983) and Ramina (born 1991). The Baijanbaevs met each other at a disco, though Jan first saw Gülnar in a fashion magazine. They got married on the same day that Leonid Brezhnev's funeral took place, on 12 November 1982.

A member of the CPSU from the age 22 and former Communist, Baijanbaev has spoken positively of the Presidency of Nursultan Nazarbayev in 2021.
