= Kazakhstani tenge =

Currency of Kazakhstan

Қазақстан теңгесі (Kazakh); Qazaqstan teñgesı (Kazakh); Казахстанский тенге (Russian); тен, тг, T
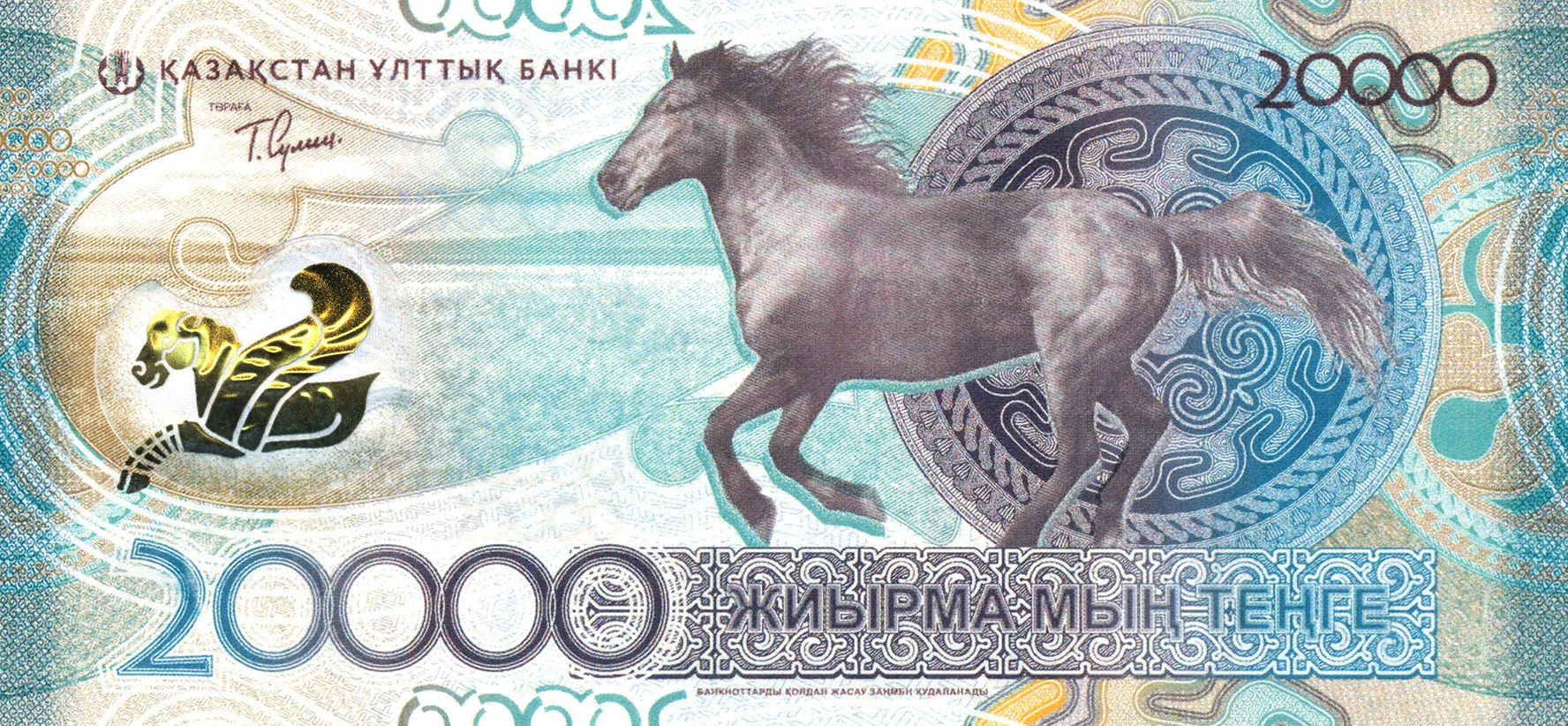
₸20,000 banknote (2026)
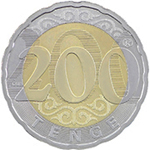
Tenge coin

ISO 4217
- Code: KZT (numeric: 398)
- Subunit: 0.01

Units of account
- Base unit: tenge
- Plural: The language(s) of this currency belong(s) to the Turkic languages. There is more than one way to construct plural forms.
- Symbol: ₸
- Subunit
- 1/100: Tiyn (Tиын)

Denominations
- Banknotes: ₸200, ₸500, ₸1,000, ₸2,000, ₸5,000, ₸10,000, ₸20,000
- Coins
- Freq. used: ₸5, ₸10, ₸20, ₸50, ₸100, ₸200
- Rarely used: ₸1, ₸2

Demographics
- Date of introduction: 1994
- Replaced: Russian ruble
- User(s): Kazakhstan

Issuance
- Central bank: National Bank of Kazakhstan
- Website: nationalbank.kz
- Printer: Banknote Factory of the National Bank of the Republic of Kazakhstan
- Website: bf.kz
- Mint: Kazakhstan Mint of the National Bank of the Republic of Kazakhstan
- Website: kazmint.kz

Valuation
- Inflation: 10.6% (May 2026)
- Source: Basic Macroeconomic Indicators on the homepage
- Method: CPI

The tenge (ten-geh, /ˈtɛŋɡɛ/ or /tɛŋˈɡeɪ/; Kazakh: теңге, teñge [tʲeŋˈɡʲe]; Russian: тенге; sign: ₸; code: KZT) is the currency of Kazakhstan. It is divided into 100 tiyn (tea-ANN, Kazakh: тиын, tiyn [təˈjən]).

== History ==
After the breakup of the Soviet Union in December 1991, most of the formerly Soviet republics attempted to maintain a common currency. Some politicians hoped to at least maintain "special relations" among former Soviet republics (the "near abroad"). Other reasons were the economic considerations for maintaining the ruble zone. The wish to preserve strong trade relations between former Soviet republics was considered the most important goal.

The break-up of the Soviet Union was not accompanied by any formal changes in monetary arrangements. The Central Bank of Russia took over the State Bank of the USSR (Gosbank) on 1 January 1992. It continued to ship Soviet notes and coins to the central banks of the eleven newly independent countries, which had formerly been the main branches of Gosbank in the republics.

The political situation, however, was not favourable for maintaining a common currency. Maintaining a common currency requires a strong political consensus in respect to monetary and fiscal targets, a common institution in charge of implementing these targets, and some minimum of common legislation (concerning the banking and foreign-exchange regulations). These conditions were far from being met amidst the turbulent economic and political situation.

During the first half of 1992, there existed a monetary union where 15 independent states all used the ruble. Since it was clear that the situation would not last, each of them was using its position as "free-riders" to issue huge amounts of money in the form of credit. As a result, some countries were issuing coupons in order to "protect" their markets from buyers from other states. The Russian central bank responded in July 1992 by setting up restrictions to the flow of credit between Russia and other states. The final collapse of the ruble zone began when Russia pulled out with the exchange of banknotes by the Central Bank of Russia on Russian territory at the end of July 1993.

As a result, Kazakhstan and other countries still in the ruble zone were "pushed out." On 12 November 1993, the president of Kazakhstan issued a decree "On introducing national currency of Republic of Kazakhstan." The tenge was introduced on 15 November 1993 to replace Soviet currency at a rate of ₸ 1 = Rbls 500. In 1991, a "special group" of designers was set up: Mendybay Alin, Timur Suleymenov, Asimsaly Duzelkhanov and Khayrulla Gabzhalilov. Thus 15 November is celebrated as the "Day of National Currency of Republic of Kazakhstan". In 1995 a tenge-printing factory opened in Kazakhstan. The first consignment of tenge banknotes were printed in the United Kingdom and the first coins were struck in Germany. In February 2019, Kazakh President Nursultan Nazarbayev signed a bill into law that would remove all Russian captions from future tenge banknotes and coins.

=== Etymology ===
The word tenge in Kazakh and in most other Turkic languages means balance, a set of weighing scale, balanced scale and parity of scale or other measurements. (Turkish denge, cf the old Uzbek tenga or the Tajik borrowed term tanga). The origin of the word is the Mongolic word teng (ᠲᠡᠩ) originating from Chinese děng (等 or 戥) which means "being equal, balance". The name of this currency is thus similar to the pound, lira, peso, taka, and shekel. The name of the currency is also related to the Russian word for money деньги / den'gi, which the Old Russian language borrowed from Turkic sources.

=== Symbol ===
The symbol for the Kazakhstani tenge.

Originally a simple letter "Т" was used to denote amounts in tenge, this is still recommended when the tenge symbol is not available. In autumn 2006 the National Bank of Kazakhstan organised a competition for a unique symbol for the currency and received over 30,000 applications.

On 20 March 2007, two days before the Nauryz holiday, the National Bank of Kazakhstan approved a graphical symbol for the tenge: ₸.

On 29 March 2007, the Bank announced two designers from Almaty, Vadim Davydenko and Sanzhar Amirkhanov, as winners for the design of the symbol of the Kazakhstani tenge. They shared a prize of ₸1,000,000 and the title of "parents" of the tenge symbol.

The character was included in Unicode 5.2.0 (August 2009) at code point U+20B8 ₸ TENGE SIGN.

== Coins ==
While older coins were struck in Germany, current coins are struck domestically, by the Kazakhstan Mint in Oskemen.

=== First series (1993) ===
In 1993, the first series of coins were introduced in denominations of 2, 5, 10, 20, and 50 tiyin featuring the national arms and were struck in bronze. The coins of ₸ 1, ₸ 3, ₸ 5, ₸ 10, and ₸ 20 were struck in cupro-nickel and depicted stylized and mythical animals. The coins of this period circulated alongside tiyin and low denomination tenge notes of equal value. Tiyin coins were withdrawn as of 7 February 2001 and lost their effect as legal currency as of 31 December 2012.

Image	Denomination	Material	Diameter	Mass	Thickness	Edge	Date of		
Image	Denomination	Material	Diameter	Mass	Thickness	Edge	Issue	Minting	Withdrawal
	2 tiyin	Brass	17.27 mm	2.26 g	1.3 mm	Smooth	1 March 1994	1993	31 December 2012
	5 tiyin	Brass	17.27 mm	2.26 g	1.3 mm	Smooth	1 March 1994	1993	31 December 2012
	10 tiyin	Brass	19.56 mm	3.48 g	1.6 mm	Smooth	1 March 1994	1993	31 December 2012
	20 tiyin	Brass	21.87 mm	4.71 g	1.7 mm	Smooth	1 March 1994	1993	31 December 2012
	50 tiyin	Brass	25 mm	7.43 g	2 mm	Smooth	1 March 1994	1993	31 December 2012
	T 1	Nickel silver	17.27 mm	2.26 g	1.3 mm	Smooth	25 October 1995	1993	1 October 2001
	T 3	Nickel silver	19.56 mm	3.48 g	1.6 mm	Smooth	25 October 1995	1993	1 October 2001
	T 5	Nickel silver	21.87 mm	4.71 g	1.7 mm	Smooth	25 October 1995	1993	1 October 2001
	T 10	Nickel silver	25 mm	7.43 g	2 mm	Smooth	25 October 1995	1993	1 October 2001
	T 20	Nickel silver	31 mm	11.37 g	2 mm	Grooved	25 October 1995	1993	1 October 2001

=== Second series (1998) ===
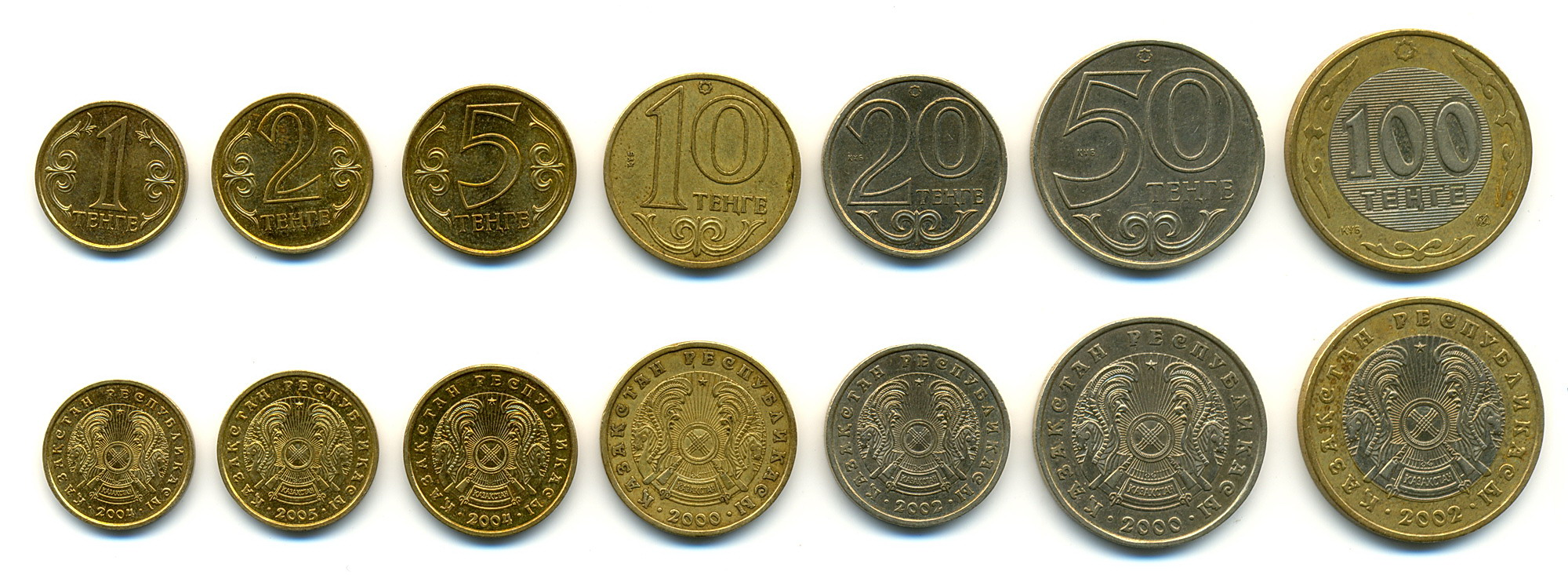
₸1, ₸2, ₸5, ₸10, ₸20, ₸50 and ₸100 coins of the second series.

In 1998, a new series of coins was introduced. After the withdrawal of tiyin denominated coins ₸ 1 became the smallest denomination. ₸ 100 were later introduced in 2002 replacing the equivalent notes. A ₸ 2 coin was introduced in 2005. In 2013 the alloy of lower denomination coins was altered.

Second series coins of the Kazakh tenge (1997–2018)
Image	Value	Technical parameters				Description			Date of			
Image	Value	Diameter	Mass	Thickness	Composition	Edge	Obverse	Reverse	Minting	Issue	Withdrawal	Lapse
	₸1	15 mm	1.63 g	1.3 mm	Alloy of "nickel silver", yellow color (since 2013 - carbon steel, galvanic coating yellow metal)	Plain	Value	Year, Emblem of Kazakhstan	1997~2018	11 November 1998	Current	
	₸2	16 mm	1.84 g	1.3 mm	Alloy of "nickel silver", yellow color (since 2013 - carbon steel, galvanic coating yellow metal)	Plain	Value	Year, Emblem of Kazakhstan	2005, 2006	23 February 2005	Current	
	₸5	17.27 mm	2.18 g	1.3 mm	Alloy of "nickel silver", yellow color (since 2013 - carbon steel, galvanic coating yellow metal)	Plain	Value	Year, Emblem of Kazakhstan	1997~2018	11 November 1998	Current	
	₸10	19.56 mm	2.81 g	1.3 mm	Alloy of "nickel silver", yellow color (since 2013 - carbon steel, galvanic coating yellow metal)	Plain	Value	Year, Emblem of Kazakhstan	1997~2018	11 November 1998	Current	
	₸20	18.27 mm	2.9 g	1.6 mm	Alloy of "nickel silver", white color (since 2013 - carbon steel and galvanic nickel)	Grooved	Value	Year, Emblem of Kazakhstan	1997~2018	11 November 1998	Current	
	₸50	23 mm	4.7 g	1.6 mm	Alloy of "nickel silver", white color (since 2013 - carbon steel and galvanic nickel)	Grooved	Value	Year, Emblem of Kazakhstan	1997~2018	11 November 1998	Current	
	₸100	24.5 mm	6.65 g	1.95 mm	Inner disk: alloy of "nickel silver", white color Outer disk: alloy of "nibrass", yellow color.	Grooved with the note - «СТО ТЕНГЕ - ЖYЗ ТЕҢГЕ» (one hundred tenge)	Value	Year, Emblem of Kazakhstan	2002~2007	1 July 2002	Current	
These images are to scale at 2.5 pixels per millimetre. For table standards, see the coin specification table.

=== Third series (2019) ===
In 2019, a new series of coins was introduced into circulation, with the same coin specifications and metallic compositions as the second series. But with the inscriptions of the coins now rendered in Latin-based Kazakh instead of Kazakh-based Cyrillic.

The coins were issued as part of the efforts of the presidential decree issued by former President Nursultan Nazarbayev of its transition of switching from a Cyrillic-based alphabet to a Latin-based alphabet and emphasizing Kazakh culture and distance the country from Russian influence. The designs of the coins were approved by Interim President Kassym-Jomart Tokayev on 20 March 2019. Previously issued coins bearing the Kazakh Cyrillic script will remain legal tender alongside the new Kazakh Latin inscribed coins. In 2019, the National Bank of Kazakhstan announced the issuance of new ₸200 coins, which were issued into circulation in 2020. This new denomination features inscriptions in Latin-based Kazakh, and like the ₸100 coin, is bi-metallic.

Third series coins of the Kazakh tenge (2019–present)
Image	Value	Technical parameters				Description			Date of			
Image	Value	Diameter	Mass	Thickness	Composition	Edge	Obverse	Reverse	Minting	Issue	Withdrawal	Lapse
1 tenge	₸1	15 mm	1.63 g	1.3 mm	Carbon steel, galvanic coating yellow metal	Plain	Value	Year, Emblem of Kazakhstan	2019~present	26 April 2019	Current	
2 tenge	₸2	16 mm	1.84 g	1.3 mm	Carbon steel, galvanic coating yellow metal	Plain	Value	Year, Emblem of Kazakhstan	2019~present	26 April 2019	Current	
5 tenge	₸5	17.27 mm	2.18 g	1.3 mm	Carbon steel, galvanic coating yellow metal	Plain	Value	Year, Emblem of Kazakhstan	2019~present	26 April 2019	Current	
10 tenge	₸10	19.56 mm	2.81 g	1.3 mm	Carbon steel, galvanic coating yellow metal	Plain	Value	Year, Emblem of Kazakhstan	2019~present	26 April 2019	Current	
20 tenge	₸20	18.27 mm	2.9 g	1.6 mm	Carbon steel and galvanic nickel	Grooved	Value	Year, Emblem of Kazakhstan	2019~present	26 April 2019	Current	
50 tenge	₸50	23 mm	4.7 g	1.6 mm	Carbon steel and galvanic nickel	Grooved	Value	Year, Emblem of Kazakhstan	2019~present	26 April 2019	Current	
100 tenge	₸100	24.5 mm	6.65 g	1.95 mm	Inner disk: alloy of "nickel silver", white color Outer disk: alloy of "nibrass", yellow color.	Grooved with the note - «JÚZ TEŃGE» (one hundred tenge)	Value	Year, Emblem of Kazakhstan	2019~present	26 April 2019	Current	
200 tenge	₸200	26 mm	7.5 g	1.9 mm	Aluminium-brass center in copper-nickel ring	Sixteen indentations ('Spanish flower') with alternate plain and reeded sections	Value	Year, Emblem of Kazakhstan	2020~present	28 January 2020	Current	
These images are to scale at 2.5 pixels per millimetre. For table standards, see the coin specification table.

=== Commemorative coins ===
Commemorative coins are issued in denominations of ₸20, ₸50, ₸100, ₸500, ₸1,000, ₸2,500, ₸5,000 and ₸10,000. Silver and gold bullion coins exist in denominations of ₸1, ₸2, ₸5, ₸10, ₸20, ₸50 and ₸100. Many of the ₸20 and ₸50 commemoratives are also struck in cupro-nickel and occasionally make it out into general circulation as a side coinage with face value.

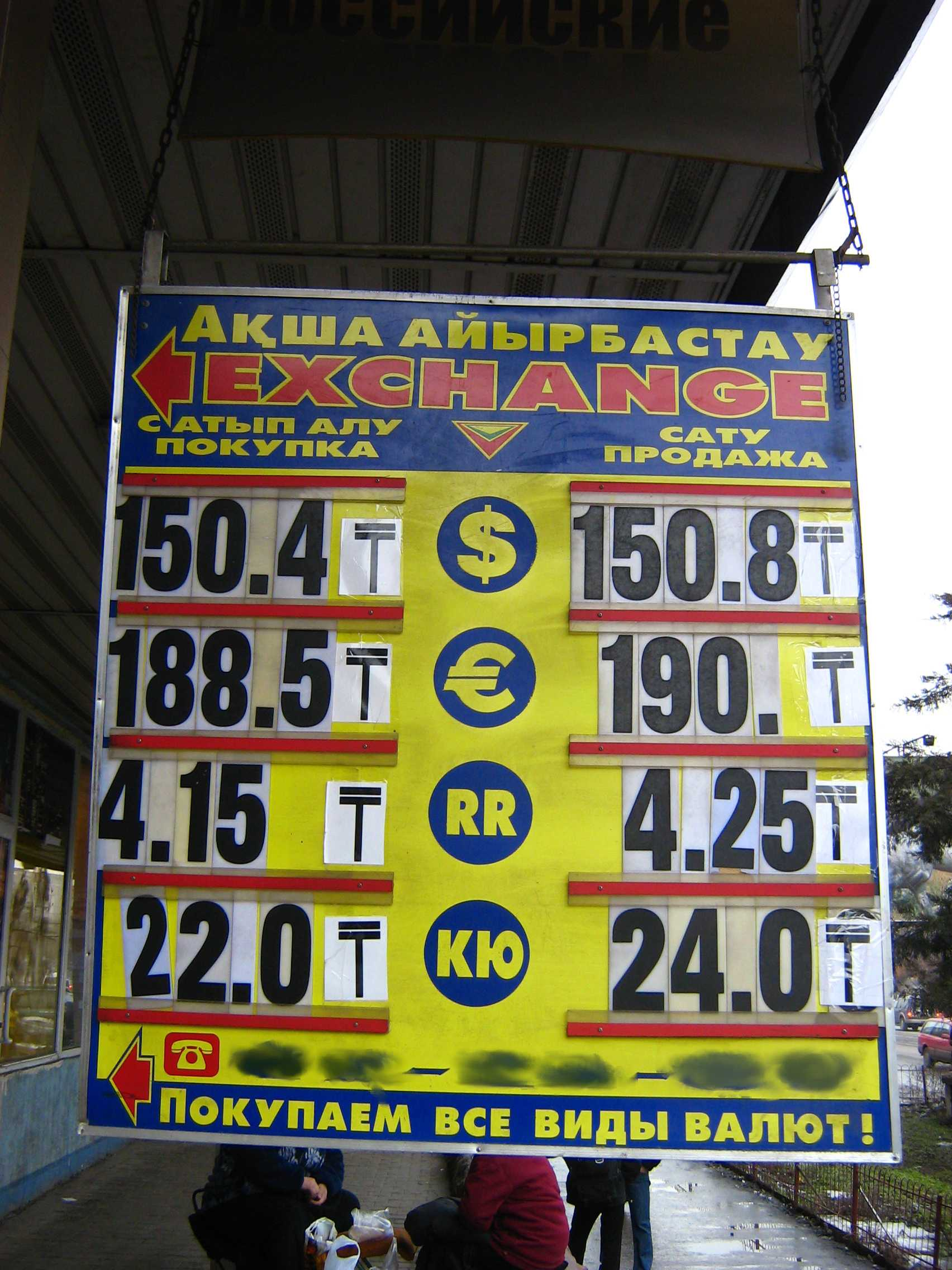
New symbol of tenge (₸) used on info-board of a currency exchange office in Almaty

== Banknotes ==
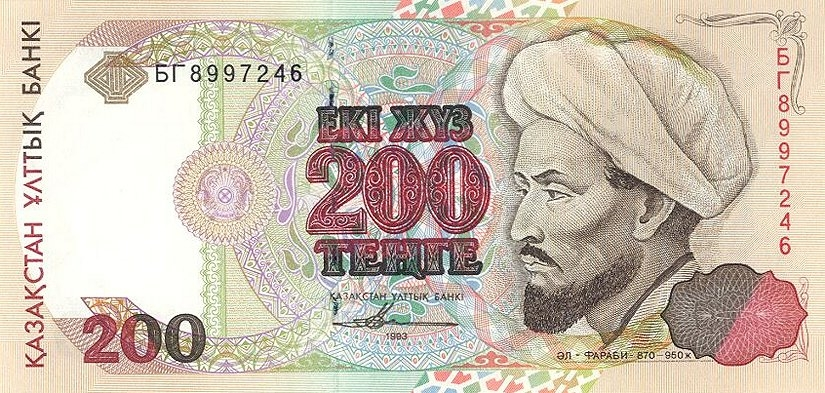
200 tenge (old design)

=== 1993 series ===
The banknotes were introduced into circulation on November 15, 1993. Following the introduction of the first series of coins, the fractional notes (denominated in tiyn) were withdrawn from circulation.

On November 15, 2006, the 1993 series banknotes of 1, 3, 5, 10, 20, 50, and 100 tenge were officially withdrawn from circulation. De facto, they began to leave circulation between 1999 and 2003. Following the withdrawal date, the old banknotes were accepted for exchange by all second-tier banks for one year; for an additional five years, the exchange could only be performed at branches of the National Bank after an authenticity check.

NBRK Banknotes (Series I)
Image		Denomination	Dimensions (mm)	Main colors	Description		Dates	
Obverse	Reverse	Denomination	Dimensions (mm)	Main colors	Obverse	Reverse	Printing	Withdrawal
		1 tiyn	105×65	Green	Denomination	Coat of arms, denomination	November 15, 1993	December 30, 1995
		2 tiyn	105×65	Blue	Denomination	Coat of arms, denomination	November 15, 1993	December 30, 1995
		5 tiyn	105×65	Violet	Denomination	Coat of arms, denomination	November 15, 1993	December 30, 1995
		10 tiyn	105×65	Pink	Denomination	Coat of arms, denomination	November 15, 1993	December 30, 1995
		20 tiyn	105×65	Turquoise	Denomination	Coat of arms, denomination	November 15, 1993	December 30, 1995
		50 tiyn	105×65	Brown	Denomination	Coat of arms, denomination	November 15, 1993	December 30, 1995
		1 tenge	124×62	Blue	Portrait of philosopher and scholar Al-Farabi (872–951)	Al-Farabi's geometric constructions and formulas	November 15, 1993	November 15, 2006
		3 tenge	124×62	Grey-green; Lime	Portrait of akyn Suyunbay Aronuly (1815–1898)	Trans-Ili Alatau mountains	November 15, 1993	November 15, 2006
		5 tenge	124×62	Brown; Yellow; Pink	Portrait of folk musician Kurmangazy Sagyrbayuly (1818–1889)	Mausoleum complex	November 15, 1993	November 15, 2006
		10 tenge	144×69	Dark green Green	Portrait of traveler and scholar Shoqan Walikhanov (1835–1865)	Ok-Zhetpes mountain	November 15, 1993	November 15, 2006
		20 tenge	144×69	Dark brown Brown	Portrait of the founder of Kazakh literature Abai Qunanbaiuly (1845–1904)	Eagle hunter with a golden eagle	November 15, 1993	November 15, 2006
		50 tenge	144×69	Light brown Brown	Portrait of the Khan of the Junior jüz Abul-Khayr Khan (1693–1748)	Rock art from Mangystau Region	November 15, 1993	November 15, 2006
		100 tenge	144×69	Violet; Pink	Portrait of the Khan of the Middle jüz Ablai Khan (1711–1781)	Mausoleum of Khoja Ahmed Yasawi	November 15, 1993	November 15, 2006
Image scale is 1.0 pixel per millimeter.

=== Banknotes of the 1993–2003 series ===
NBRK Banknotes (Series II)
Image		Denomination (tenge)	Dimensions (mm)	Main colors	Description		Dates		
Obverse	Reverse	Denomination (tenge)	Dimensions (mm)	Main colors	Obverse	Reverse	Issue	Printing	Withdrawal
		200	144×69	Light orange	Portrait of Al-Farabi	Fragment of the Mausoleum of Khoja Ahmed Yasawi	March 1, 1994	1993	September 1, 2001
		200	144×69	Light orange	Portrait of Al-Farabi	Fragment of the Mausoleum of Khoja Ahmed Yasawi	September 1, 2000	1999	November 15, 2007
		200	144×69	Light orange	Portrait of Al-Farabi	Fragment of the Mausoleum of Khoja Ahmed Yasawi	November 15, 2002	1999	November 15, 2007
		500	144×69	Light violet	Portrait of Al-Farabi	Fragment of the Mausoleum of Khoja Ahmed Yasawi	July 27, 1994	1994	September 1, 2001
		500	144×69	Light violet	Portrait of Al-Farabi	Fragment of the Mausoleum of Khoja Ahmed Yasawi	September 1, 2000	1999	November 15, 2007
		500	144×69	Light violet	Portrait of Al-Farabi	Fragment of the Mausoleum of Khoja Ahmed Yasawi	November 15, 2002	1999	November 15, 2007
		1,000	144×69	Bluish green	Portrait of Al-Farabi	Fragment of the Mausoleum of Khoja Ahmed Yasawi	February 14, 1995	1994	November 1, 2002
		1,000	144×69	Light blue Blue	Portrait of Al-Farabi	Fragment of the Mausoleum of Khoja Ahmed Yasawi	November 2, 2001	2000	November 15, 2007
		2,000	144×69	Green; Black	Portrait of Al-Farabi	Fragment of the Mausoleum of Khoja Ahmed Yasawi	November 15, 1996	1996	November 1, 2002
		2,000	144×69	Green; Light blue	Portrait of Al-Farabi	Fragment of the Mausoleum of Khoja Ahmed Yasawi	November 2, 2001	2000	November 15, 2007
		5,000	149×74	Red; Brown	Portrait of Al-Farabi	Fragment of the Mausoleum of Khoja Ahmed Yasawi	November 15, 1999	1998	November 15, 2007
		5,000	149×74	Brown; Violet	Portrait of Al-Farabi	Fragment of the Mausoleum of Khoja Ahmed Yasawi	December 16, 2001	2001	November 15, 2007
		10,000	149×74	Light blue Blue	Portrait of Al-Farabi	Snow leopard with mountains in the background	July 28, 2003	2003	November 15, 2007
Image scale is 1.0 pixel per millimeter.

In 2016, the 10,000 tenge banknote was recognized as the most beautiful banknote in the world by The Telegraph newspaper.

=== 2006 series ===
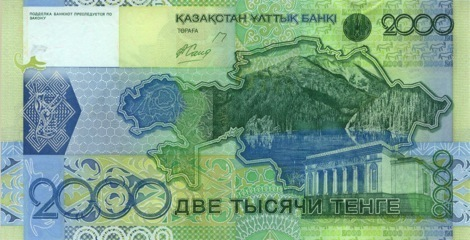
Some ₸2,000 notes spelled the word банкі (bank) incorrectly as банқі.

The National Bank of Kazakhstan issued a new series of tenge banknotes in 2006. This was not a currency reform as they replaced existing notes at face value.

The 2006 series is far more exotic than its predecessors. The obverse is vertical and the denomination is written in Kazakh. All denominations depict the Bayterek monument, the flag of Kazakhstan, the Coat of arms, the handprint with a signature of president Nursultan Nazarbayev and fragments of the national anthem. The main differences across each denomination are only the colours, denominations and underprint patterns.

On the contrast, the reverse side of the notes are more different. The denomination is written in Russian, and each denomination shows a unique building and geography of Kazakhstan in the outline of its borders.

The first printing of the ₸2,000 and ₸5,000 notes issued in 2006 had misspellings of the word for "bank" (the correct spelling "банкі" bankı was misspelled "*банқі" banqı). The misspelling was a politically sensitive issue due to the cultural and political importance of the Kazakh language.

On 3 October 2016, the ₸2,000, ₸5,000 and ₸10,000 banknotes of the 2006 series lost their legal tender status and are no longer valid. From 4 October 2016 to 3 October 2017, these notes could be exchanged without commission at any second tier bank and branches of the National Bank of Kazakhstan.

2006 Series
Image		Value	Main Colour	Description		Date of issue
Obverse	Reverse	Value	Main Colour	Obverse	Reverse	Date of issue
		₸200	orange	Astana Bayterek monument, Kazakhstan flag, Kazakhstan coat of arms, handprint with a signature of Kazakh President Nursultan Nazarbayev, fragments of the national anthem, value in numerals and Kazakh words, issuing bank in Kazakh, inscription in Kazakh stating that counterfeiting banknotes is against the law	Transport and Communication Ministry and a winged snow leopard on the bridge over River Ishim, outline map of Kazakhstan with Ministry of Defense and the steppes in the background, value in Russian, name of issuing in Kazakh, logo of issuing bank, inscription in Russian stating that counterfeiting banknotes is against the law	2006–2016
		₸500	blue	Astana Bayterek monument, Kazakhstan flag, Kazakhstan coat of arms, handprint with a signature of Kazakh President Nursultan Nazarbayev, fragments of the national anthem, value in numerals and Kazakh words, issuing bank in Kazakh, inscription in Kazakh stating that counterfeiting banknotes is against the law	Ministry of Finance and Akimat (City Hall) of Astana, outline map of Kazakhstan with gulls over the sea in background, value in Russian, name of issuing in Kazakh, logo of issuing bank, inscription in Russian stating that counterfeiting banknotes is against the law	2006–2016
		₸1,000	brown	Astana Bayterek monument, Kazakhstan flag, Kazakhstan coat of arms, handprint with a signature of Kazakh President Nursultan Nazarbayev, fragments of the national anthem, value in numerals and Kazakh words, issuing bank in Kazakh, inscription in Kazakh stating that counterfeiting banknotes is against the law	President Culture Center, outline map of Kazakhstan with mountains in background, value in Russian, name of issuing in Kazakh, logo of issuing bank, inscription in Russian stating that counterfeiting banknotes is against the law	2006–2016
		₸2,000	green	Astana Bayterek monument, Kazakhstan flag, Kazakhstan coat of arms, handprint with a signature of Kazakh President Nursultan Nazarbayev, fragments of the national anthem, value in numerals and Kazakh words, issuing bank in Kazakh, inscription in Kazakh stating that counterfeiting banknotes is against the law	Abai Opera House, outline map of Kazakhstan with mountain lake in background, value in Russian, name of issuing in Kazakh, logo of issuing bank, inscription in Russian stating that counterfeiting banknotes is against the law	2006–2016
		₸5,000	red	Astana Bayterek monument, Kazakhstan flag, Kazakhstan coat of arms, handprint with a signature of Kazakh President Nursultan Nazarbayev, fragments of the national anthem, value in numerals and Kazakh words, issuing bank in Kazakh, inscription in Kazakh stating that counterfeiting banknotes is against the law	Independence Monument and Hotel Kazakhstan, outline map of Kazakhstan with mountains in background, value in Russian, name of issuing in Kazakh, logo of issuing bank, inscription in Russian stating that counterfeiting banknotes is against the law	2006–2016
		₸10,000	purple	Astana Bayterek monument, Kazakhstan flag, Kazakhstan coat of arms, handprint with a signature of Kazakh President Nursultan Nazarbayev, fragments of the national anthem, value in numerals and Kazakh words, issuing bank in Kazakh, inscription in Kazakh stating that counterfeiting banknotes is against the law	Residence Akorda (presidential palace), outline map of Kazakhstan with canyons in the background, value in Russian, name of issuing in Kazakh, logo of issuing bank, inscription in Russian stating that counterfeiting banknotes is against the law	2006–2016

=== 2011–2022 series ===
The National Bank of Kazakhstan issued a new series of tenge banknotes dated 2011, 2012, 2013 and 2014 in denominations of ₸1,000, ₸2,000, ₸5,000, and ₸10,000. The designs for this series feature the "Kazakh Eli" monument on the front of the notes. On 1 December 2015, a new ₸20,000 banknote was introduced. It contains the issue date of 2013, and is a commemorative note to celebrate the 20th anniversary of the introduction of its national currency, but was not issued until 2015. In 2017, the National Bank of Kazakhstan issued a ₸500 banknote as part of this series, but has caused controversy over an image of a gull on the reverse side of the note and the image of the Moscow business center in Kazakhstan's capital of Astana.

NBRK Banknotes (Series IV)
Image		Denomination (tenge)	Dimensions (mm)	Main colors	Description		Dates		
Obverse	Reverse	Denomination (tenge)	Dimensions (mm)	Main colors	Obverse	Reverse	Issue	Printing	Withdrawal
		500	130х67	Blue	Kazak Eli monument; flying doves; national coat of arms and flag of Kazakhstan; buildings: Astana Arena, Moscow BC, Independence Palace, Senate of the Parliament of Kazakhstan, Khan Shatyr	Outline map of Kazakhstan with gulls against the background of the Caspian Sea	November 22, 2017	2017	December 27, 2027
		1,000	134х70	Brown	Kazak Eli monument; flying doves; national coat of arms and flag of Kazakhstan	Outline map of Kazakhstan with the Ustyurt Plateau	December 1, 2014	2014	In circulation until March 27, 2027
		1,000	134х70	Brown	Kazak Eli monument; flying doves; national coat of arms and flag of Kazakhstan	Outline map of Kazakhstan with the Ustyurt Plateau	After January 28, 2016		In circulation until March 27, 2027
		2,000	139х73	Green	Kazak Eli monument and Khan Shatyr; flying doves and a saiga antelope; national coat of arms and flag of Kazakhstan, Palace of Peace and Reconciliation, Ak Orda	Outline map of Kazakhstan with the Irtysh River	March 29, 2013	2012	In circulation until June 24, 2026
		2,000	139х73	Green	Kazak Eli monument and Khan Shatyr; flying doves and a saiga antelope; national coat of arms and flag of Kazakhstan, Palace of Peace and Reconciliation, Ak Orda	Outline map of Kazakhstan with the Irtysh River	After January 28, 2016		In circulation until June 24, 2026
		5,000	144×76	Red	Kazak Eli monument; flying doves and snow leopards; national coat of arms and flag of Kazakhstan, Independence Palace, Palace of Peace and Reconciliation, Ak Orda	Independence Monument and Hotel Kazakhstan in Almaty; outline map of Kazakhstan with the Trans-Ili Alatau mountains	December 30, 2011	2011	September 25, 2025
		5,000	144×76	Red	Kazak Eli monument; flying doves and snow leopards; national coat of arms and flag of Kazakhstan, Independence Palace, Palace of Peace and Reconciliation, Ak Orda	Independence Monument and Hotel Kazakhstan in Almaty; outline map of Kazakhstan with the Trans-Ili Alatau mountains	After January 28, 2016		September 25, 2025
		10,000	149×79	Blue violet	Kazak Eli monument; flying doves; national coat of arms and flag of Kazakhstan, Independence Palace, Palace of Peace and Reconciliation, Ak Orda	Ak Orda in Astana; outline map of Kazakhstan	April 10, 2012	2012	In circulation until June 27, 2026
		10,000	149×79	Blue violet	Kazak Eli monument; flying doves; national coat of arms and flag of Kazakhstan, Independence Palace, Palace of Peace and Reconciliation, Ak Orda	Ak Orda in Astana; outline map of Kazakhstan	After January 28, 2016		In circulation until June 27, 2026
		20,000	155×79	Grey	Kazak Eli monument; flying doves and a triumphal arch	Panoramic view of Astana and Ak Orda, stylized soaring golden eagle	October 1, 2022	2022	In circulation

=== 2023–2025 series ===
The National Bank of Kazakhstan announced a new series of banknotes set for issue from 2023 to 2025. Named "Saka", the series will introduce notes issued in a reduced size, drop the Russian language, and incorporate many new security features for all six denominations. Banknotes of the previous series will cease to be legal tender after the release of each denomination, and will be redeemable at banks and post offices for up to three years. The National Bank of Kazakhstan will redeem all previous issues without limit.

NBRK Banknotes (Series V)
Image		Denomination (tenge)	Dimensions (mm)	Main colors	Description		Dates	
Obverse	Reverse	Denomination (tenge)	Dimensions (mm)	Main colors	Obverse	Reverse	Issue	Printing
		500	125×70	Blue	"Tree of Life" branch with a soaring bird, DNA helix and an infinity symbol stylized as an ornament, ornament in the shape of an argali figure	Argali	December 25, 2025	2025
		1,000	130×70	Brown	"Tree of Life" branch with a soaring bird, DNA helix and an infinity symbol stylized as an ornament, ornament in the shape of a dog figure	Alabay and Tazy	March 28, 2025	2024
		2,000	135×70	Green	"Tree of Life" branch with a soaring bird, DNA helix and an infinity symbol stylized as an ornament, ornament in the shape of a saiga figure	Saiga	December 25, 2024	2024
		5,000	140×70	Red-orange	"Tree of Life" branch with a soaring bird, DNA helix and an infinity symbol stylized as an ornament, ornament in the shape of a golden eagle figure	Golden eagle	December 25, 2023	2023
		10,000	145×70	Violet	"Tree of Life" branch with a soaring bird, DNA helix and an infinity symbol stylized as an ornament, ornament in the shape of a snow leopard figure	Snow leopard	June 28, 2024	2023
		20,000	150×70	Blue-yellow	"Tree of Life" branch with a soaring bird, DNA helix and an infinity symbol stylized as an ornament, ornament in the shape of a horse figure	Horse	Planned for 2026	2025

=== Commemorative banknotes ===
Since 2008, a number of commemorative designs have been issued, including notes celebrating the 2011 Asian Winter Games hosted in Astana. Commemoratives can typically be found in these denominations: ₸1,000, ₸2,000, ₸5,000, and ₸10,000.

== Digital tenge ==
The National Bank of Kazakhstan publicly released plans to develop a national digital currency.

== Commemorative banknotes ==
Image		Denomination (tenge)	Dimensions (mm)	Main colors	Description		Dates		
Obverse	Reverse	Denomination (tenge)	Dimensions (mm)	Main colors	Obverse	Reverse	Issue	Printing	Withdrawal
		1,000	134×70	Turquoise green	Coat of arms of Kazakhstan; national ornaments and flying birds; Bayterek monument in Astana	Ak Orda, official residence of the President of Kazakhstan in Astana; national ornaments; image of a bird	January 5, 2010	2010	In circulation
		1,000	134×70	Green blue	Dome of the Mausoleum of Khoja Ahmed Yasawi; national coat of arms and flag of Kazakhstan	Mausoleum of Khoja Ahmed Yasawi	May 25, 2011	2011	In circulation
		1,000	134×70	Yellow brown	Kazak Eli monument and fragment of the Kul Tigin sculpture; flying doves; national coat of arms and flag of Kazakhstan	Petroglyphs of Turkic warriors; monument of Turkic writing	December 12, 2013	2013	In circulation
		1,000	130×70	Brown-beige	Memorial of Glory in Almaty; national ornaments and silhouettes of flying cranes; national coat of arms and flag of Kazakhstan	Map of Kazakhstan composed of historical archive photos; Order of the Patriotic War; text and logo of the 80th anniversary of Great Victory in the Great Patriotic War	May 8, 2025	2025	In circulation
		2,000	139×73	Green	Bayterek monument; musical notes of the national anthem, flag and coat of arms of Kazakhstan; open palm; petroglyph	Ski jumper against a mountain backdrop and symbols of the 7th Winter Asian Games	January 17, 2011	2011	In circulation
		5,000	149×77	Red	Portrait of Al-Farabi; overprint reading "10 Years of Independence of the Republic of Kazakhstan"	Fragment of the Mausoleum of Khoja Ahmed Yasawi	December 16, 2001	2001	November 15, 2007
		5,000	144×76	Brown red	Bayterek monument; musical notes of the national anthem, flag and coat of arms of Kazakhstan; open palm; petroglyph	Independence Monument and Hotel Kazakhstan in Almaty; outline map of Kazakhstan with mountains	July 8, 2008	2008	In circulation
		10,000	149×79	Blue violet	Kazak Eli monument; flying doves; national coat of arms and flag of Kazakhstan	Ak Orda in Astana; outline map of Kazakhstan; text and logo of the 20th anniversary of independence	July 4, 2011	2011	In circulation
		10,000	149×79	Blue violet	Kazak Eli monument; fragment of the headwear of the Issyk Golden Man; Trans-Ili Alatau mountains	Portrait of Nursultan Nazarbayev; buildings of Astana; Bayterek monument	December 1, 2016	2016	In circulation
		10,000	145×70	Pink, blue	Map of Kazakhstan with regions, decorated in traditional style with elements of Kazakh ornament	General outline of the map of the Eurasian continent	November 15, 2023	2023	In circulation
		20,000	155×79	Grey violet	Kazak Eli monument; flying doves and a triumphal arch; national coat of arms and flag of Kazakhstan	Ak Orda in Astana; Parliament and Government buildings; outline map of Kazakhstan; text and logo of the 20th anniversary of the tenge	December 1, 2015	2013	In circulation
		20,000	155×79	Grey	Kazak Eli monument; flying doves and a triumphal arch; national coat of arms and flag of Kazakhstan; "QAZAQSTAN ULTTYQ BANKI" logo	Portrait of Nursultan Nazarbayev; Ak Orda and other buildings in Astana; outline map of Kazakhstan; text and logo of the 30th anniversary of independence	December 1, 2021	2021	In circulation
Image scale is 1.0 pixel per millimeter.

== Exchange rates and inflation ==
On 2 September 2013, the National Bank of Kazakhstan moved the tenge from a managed float and pegged it to the US dollar and the Russian ruble.

On 11 February 2014, the Kazakh National Bank chose to devalue the tenge by 19% against the U.S. dollar in response to a weakening of the Russian ruble.

On 20 August 2015, the Kazakhstan National Bank did away with the currency band with respect to conversion rate of tenge. Now, the tenge is a free-floating currency and its exchange rate against the major currencies are determined by demand and supply in the market. Due to this change, the tenge lost 30% of its value in a single day.

Current KZT exchange rates
From Google Finance:	AUD CAD CHF CNY EUR GBP HKD JPY USD RUB TRY
From Yahoo! Finance:	AUD CAD CHF CNY EUR GBP HKD JPY USD RUB TRY
From XE.com:	AUD CAD CHF CNY EUR GBP HKD JPY USD RUB TRY
From OANDA:	AUD CAD CHF CNY EUR GBP HKD JPY USD RUB TRY

Historical average exchange rates
	USD	EUR	RUB
1999	119.52	130.00	4.82
2000	142.13	134.40	5.05
2001	146.74	132.40	5.04
2002	153.28	144.68	4.89
2003	n/a	168.79	4.87
2004	136.04	169.04	4.72
2005	132.88	165.42	4.70
2006	126.09	158.27	4.64
2007	122.55	167.75	4.79
2008	120.30	177.04	4.86
2009	147.50	205.67	4.66
2010	147.35	195.67	4.85
2011	146.62	204.11	5.00
2012 (Jan)	148.38	191.27	4.73
2014–4–14	182.02	252.72	5.11
2016-9-30	335.64	377.42	5.33
2018	346.42	407.86	5.50
2020	413.12	470.46	5.17
2022	461.57	485.84	6.84
2024	469.64	508.11	5.06

	Annual inflation rate,%
1994	1160.262
1995	60.388
1996	28.763
1997	11.321
1998	1.880
1999	18.095
2000	10.001
2001	6.582
2002	6.686
2003	7.001
2004	7.011
2005	7.868
2006	8.400
2007	18.772
2008	9.484
2009	6.377
2010	7.969
2011	7.429
2012	6.0
2013	5.83
2014	6.72
2015	6.65
2016	14.56
2017	7.43
2018	6.03

== See also ==
- Economy of Kazakhstan
