= Jan Izbasar =

Kazakh actor

- Жан Ізбасар
- Born: 16 December 1986 (age 39); Alma-Ata, Alma-Ata Oblast, Kazakh SSR, Soviet Union
- Education: Kazakh Ablai Khan University of International Relations and World Languages
- Spouse: Nazgül Izbasar (divorced)

Jan Izbasar (Kazakh: Жан Ізбасар; born 16 December 1986) is a Kazakh actor, best known for playing Sapog in the series Village Escape by Nurtas Adambay.

== Early life and education ==
Izbasar was born on 16 December 1986 in Almaty. He studied at the Kazakh Ablai Khan University of International Relations and World Languages.

== Career ==
Izbasar is known as a cast member of the movie Bride Sabina.

Izbasar is known for playing Sapog in the Village Escape series. He returned to the role for the movie Village Escape. Love Affair.

In November 2015, a YouTube video of Izbasar being beaten, forced to quit acting became viral among Kazakh users. Not long afterwards, Nurtas Adambay revealed that it was a publicity stunt to promote the series Village Escape.

== Personal life ==
At some point, Izbasar divorced his wife Nazgül Qanatqyzy Izbasar, (Note: In this name that follows East Slavic naming customs, the patronymic is Qanatqyzy and the family name is Izbasar.) with whom he has a child, Arlan. He pays the child's alimony. Ämina Täjıbaeva, "Perzent" children's home chairwoman, has voiced her will to help Nazgül Izbasar.
