= Waiting for the Sea =

- Film poster
- Russian: В ожидании моря
- Directed by: Bakhtyar Khudojnazarov
- Screenplay by: Sergey Ashkenazi
- Produced by: Thanassis Karathanos; Karl Baumgartner; Oleg Ogronski; Bakhtyar Khudojnazarov
- Starring: Egor Beroev; Sayora Safary; Anastasiya Mikulchina; Detlev Buck; Dinmukhamet Akhimov
- Music by: Shuhei Kamimura; Richard Horowitz; Svetlana Surganova
- Production companies: Pallas Film; VISS Company
- Release date: November 9, 2012 (Rome)
- Running time: 103 minutes
- Countries: Russia; Ukraine; Kazakhstan; Germany; France; Belgium
- Language: Russian

Waiting for the Sea (Russian: В ожидании моря; V ozhidanii morya) is a 2012 film by Bakhtyar Khudojnazarov with collaboration from Russia, Ukraine, Kazakhstan, Germany, France, and Belgium. The film is set in the backdrop of the dried-up Aral Sea and addresses the impact of the ecological catastrophe on the fate of the people in that region.

It is the last part of the Central Asia trilogy that Khudojnazarov had planned, which started with his 1999 film Luna Papa. The second part of the trilogy, a tragicomedy named "Living Fish" (Живая рыба) after a screenplay by Oleg Antonov, had been projected since the year 2000, but was never completed as a result of the financial crisis in 2008 and the deaths of producer Karl Baumgartner in 2014 and Khudojnazarov in 2015. Waiting for the Sea was in the works in 2009.

== Plot summary ==
From the port town of Abasta (which resembles Mo‘ynoq) at the southern shore of the Aral Sea, Captain Marat sets off on a fishing trip despite a storm warning, since on this day an extraordinary amount of fish comes into the bay. After some hesitation, he takes his wife Dari along but sends her younger sister Tamara home. The ship sinks in the storm, leaving Marat the sole survivor.

Ten years later, Marat is released from prison and returns to the town only to find that the sea has gone. The sea is now far away, and the port's pier rises into a vast sand desert with rusted ships. Town people treat Marat with hostility for the loss of their relatives during the naval accident. None of the missing crew members was ever found. Tortured by feelings of guilt, Marat starts to drag his ship with his own muscles in search of the sea. Only his old friend Balthazar stands by him. Tamara, the younger sister of his drowned wife Dari, loved Marat from her childhood and is now desperately trying to win his heart; Marat insists that Dari is his wife and tells her that he has "ashes in his heart". He only lives on for his quest of searching the sea, believing that if he finds the sea, he would also see his crew and his beloved wife Dari again, because "the sea doesn't kill. It returns what it takes".

In the end, Marat dies of sickness and exhaustion. The perspective now changes into the soul of Marat: In a storm the sea returns and takes Marat on his ship out in the open, accompanied by the revelation of John 21:1.

== Cast ==
- Egor Beroev as Marat.
- Sayora Safary as Marat's wife
- Anastasiya Mikulchina as Dari / Tamara.
- Detlev Buck as Balthazar.
- Dinmukhamet Akhimov as Dari's and Tamara's father.
- Radzhab Khuseynov as Marduni.
- Pavel Priluchnyy as Yasan.
- Daulet Kekelbayev as Kvidak.

== Filming locations ==
The film was shot in Kazakhstan on the Mangyshlak Peninsula in the mountainous deserts of the Caspian Sea and near the old port of Aktau. The film set of Abasta is still present at 104 km north of Aktau near Tauchik (at N 44 ° 24.112 E51 ° 34.076) and is an excursion destination.

== Reception ==
Xan Brooks of theguardian.com rated it 3/5 stars and wrote, "Khudojnazarov's film is a big, broad, magical-realist folk tale, infested with too many crude archetypes (object of beauty, wise old hermit, roustabout best mate) to properly convince as human drama. But if the acid test of an international film festival is its ability to show us places we never knew existed, to transport us to other worlds and unfamiliar cultures, then Waiting for the Sea must count as a roaring success."
