= Elevator (2018 film) =

2018 Kazakh drama film

- Theatrical release poster
- Directed by: Nurtas Adambay
- Screenplay by: Nurtas Adambay
- Starring: Jandos Aibasov; Isbek Äbilmäjinov; Gülnaz Jolanova
- Production company: Nurtas Production
- Release date: October 11, 2018 (Kazakhstan)
- Country: Kazakhstan
- Languages: Russian and Kazakh
- Budget: $100,000

Elevator (Russian: Лифт, Lift) is a 2018 Kazakh drama film and psychological thriller by Nurtas Adambay. It is known as Adambay's second drama film, being preceded by Taraz, and Adambay's fifth movie overall.

== Plot ==
The movie's plot revolves around two characters, Timur, son to a skyscraper owner, played by Jandos Aibasov, and Asqar, a newly employed old security guard, played by Isbek Äbilmäjinov. The two main characters get stuck in an elevator for three days, awaiting Monday, and attempt to survive. Timur's love interest is played by actress Gülnaz Jolanova.

The plot reflected the corruption in Kazakhstan as well. One of its main characters could not see his relatives after a dispute with the son of a chinovnik.

== Production ==
Though Adambay's previous drama film Taraz paid off in the box office, he himself said that he did not plan to earn much money with Elevator, calling it a "creative need". The idea of creating Elevator came to Adambay during the production of Taraz.

In March 2017, Adambay reported that he could not find a sponsor for the movie. It was thus decided that it'd be made from Adambay's own pocket.

It was reported that choosing the cast didn't take very long: Gülnaz Jolanova as the main character was an "easy choice", and the main actors were already envisioned with their respective characters. Filming only lasted 14 days and took place in Almaty and Almaty Region. The budget was $100,000 overall. The production officially started on February 13, 2017, and ended on March 5, 2017.

This movie is noted as being Adambay's first movie where he himself doesn't star as any character. Adambay noted in March 2017, that this screenplay took the longest for him to write. He was both the director and writer of the movie.

== Release ==
The movie was released in October 2018, and Adambay attended the premiere, alongside director Akan Satayev, and actors Erden Telemisov and Äziz Beişenäliev. In the same year, the movie was officially reuploaded to YouTube for free viewing.

== Reception ==
The movie was reportedly received well. After being nominated in three categories at the Genre Celebration Festival in the United States, it was proposed that the movie is introduced to the Amazon Prime Video online subscription services.

Adambay himself later reported that he was not completely satisfied with the movie. He said that, even during the first edits, he was overwhelmed by the complicated production, and called the year 2018 "a fight he lost".
