= Kazakhstan-United Kingdom Intergovernmental Commission =

Kazakh-British relations

- Kazakhstan: United Kingdom

Envoy
- Ambassador Magzhan Ilyassov: Ambassador Josef McCauley

The Kazakhstan-United Kingdom Intergovernmental Commission (IGC) on Trade, Economic, Scientific, Technical, and Cultural Cooperation was established in 2013 to strengthen bilateral relations between the two nations. The commission aims to foster cooperation in various sectors, including oil and gas, finance, education, technology, and mining. Regular plenary sessions are held to discuss strategic partnerships and facilitate dialogue on key issues. In 2018, a significant meeting led by U.K. Minister of State for Trade Policy George Hollingbery, highlighted expanding cooperation, particularly in oil, gas, mining, and financial services, with over 500 British companies operating in Kazakhstan by that time.

As of February 2020, two-way trade between the two countries was valued at $3.2 billion. The commission has supported Kazakhstan’s economic transformation, including the creation of the Astana International Financial Centre (AIFC), which operates under English common law.

In 2019, a plenary session focused on Kazakhstan's political stability, economic diversification, and its growing role as a trade partner post-Brexit. Notably, in December 2020, the seventh plenary session addressed post-COVID-19 economic recovery and strategic partnerships, with the U.K. increasing its direct investment in Kazakhstan by 33%.

The session also promoted participation in Kazakhstan’s modernization initiatives, such as the "Digital Kazakhstan" project, and discussed the development of green finance. Further cooperation has extended into areas like renewable energy, green energy, and education, with a policy forum held in November 2021 focusing on transnational education and higher education partnerships.
