= Marat Sarsembaev =

Kazakh doctor of law and professor (born 1947)

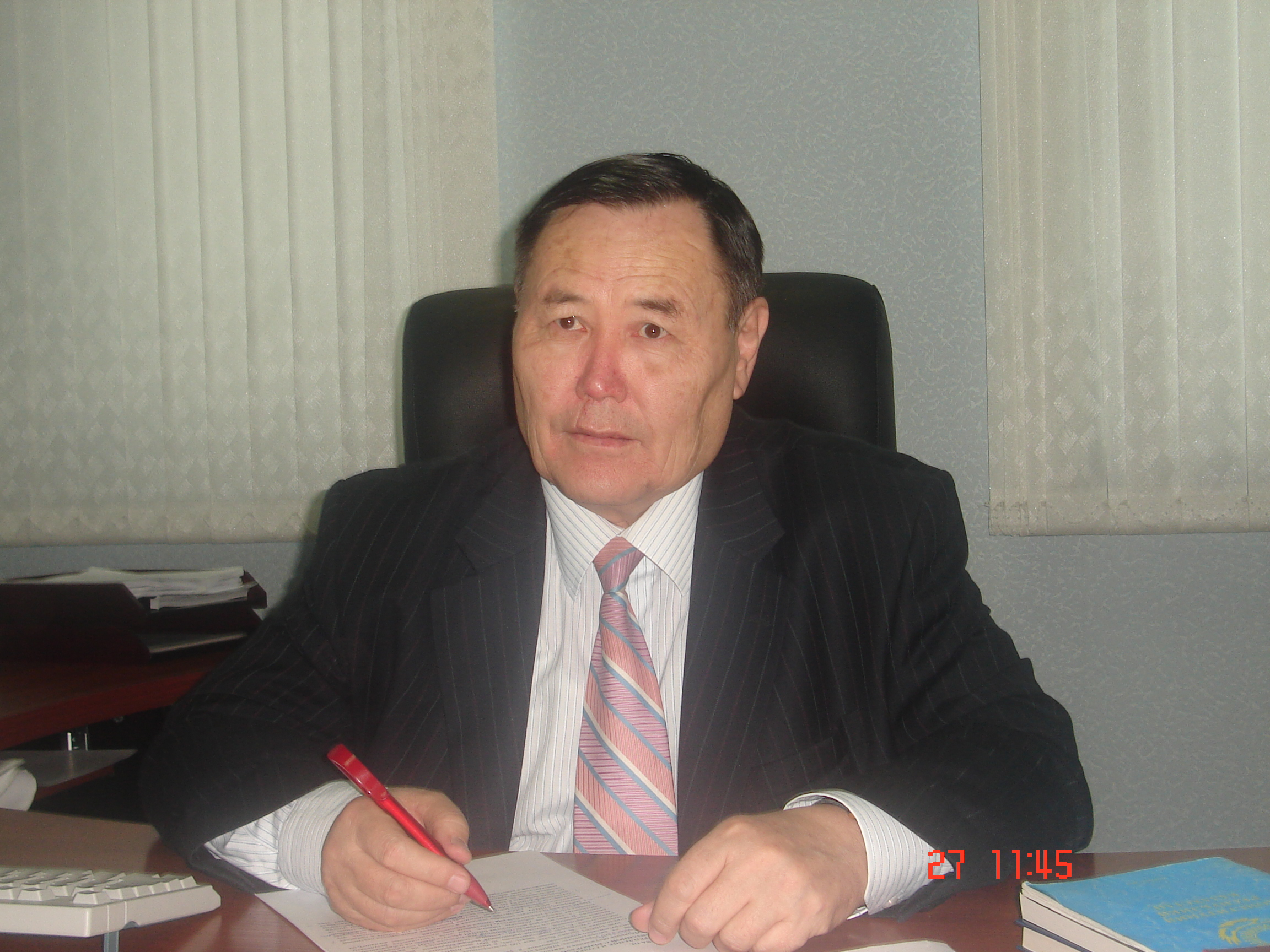

Marat Aldangaruly Sarsembaev (Kazakh: Марат Алдоңғарұлы Сәрсембаев, born December 15, 1947) is a Kazakh doctor of law and professor. He has won a range of international awards for his work.

Sarsembaev is a member of the Central Election Commission of the Republic of Kazakhstan. He was appointed to the position by decree of the President of the Republic of Kazakhstan in 2007. Sarsembaev was born in the village of Ekpendy, in the Andreevsky district (now Alakolsky) of the Taldy-Kurgan (now Almaty) region in the Kazakh Soviet Socialist Republic (now Kazakhstan).

Sarsembaev finished Andreevsky Russian high school in 1965. Sarsembaev graduated from the faculty of English language of Almaty Pedogogical Teacher's Institute of Foreign Languages (now the Kazakh Ablai Khan University of International Relations and World Languages) in 1969 with honours. In 1973 he graduated from the law school of Kazakh State University (now the Kazakh National University) with honors. He gained his doctorate in 1994 with a thesis on the theme of International law issues in the "History of Kazakhstan and Central Asia (From the 15th Century to the Present)" at the Institute of State and Law at the Russian Academy of Sciences in Moscow, Russian Federation. In 2012, he became a member of the UN Human Rights Committee.

== Career ==
Marat Sarsembaev takes part in sessions of the dissertational boards of candidates and doctors' theses at the faculties of Kazakhstani and foreign universities (Russia, Uzbekistan, France, etc). He serves as a member of dissertational councils, a scientific adviser, and an expert on international law and law of Kazakhstan, world economics, and international relations.

Sarsembaev is involved in the process of the formulation and editing of bills. He also drafts codes and international treaties of the Republic of Kazakhstan as an expert on customs, tax, labour codes in the parliament, CEC, Constitutional Council, and other ministries and departments of the Republic of Kazakhstan. He's also considered an expert on current laws of the Republic of Kazakhstan concerning foreign policy and internal problems of the country.

He served as president of the Association of Educational Institutions of the Republic from 1996 to 2001. He lectured in the MSIIR in 1977, University of Rennes, in 1980, Villanova University in 1994, Indiana University (U.S.) in 1997, and Kabul University (Afghanistan) in 1985–1987. In total, he's lectured at ten domestic and six foreign universities.

He has won many international awards and competitions, including a Fulbright Award as a Fulbright Research Scholar (named after J. William Fulbright). He received this award for his work in the U.S., where he spent ten months in 1997 "conducting research on the formation of private property law in the U.S. and other countries for a project on the problems of property law in domestic and international law" according to Indiana Law Annotated.

He is the winner of the Soros-Kazakhstan Fund which is awarded for his high school textbook International law being recognized as the best among 120 textbooks sent to the republican competition of 1995. The competition was held with the assistance of the Ministry of Education and Science of the Republic of Kazakhstan.

Sarsembaev is also a member of the Legal Policy Board at the President of the Republic of Kazakhstan, and a member of the Executive Committee of Russian Association of International Law.

From 1973 to 2000 he was the dean of the faculty of law and head of international law at Kazakhstan National University. He was the rector of Daneker University, and a director and professor at the Law Institute of the L. N. Gumilyov Eurasian National University. He also worked as the head of the Department for International Relations of the Central Election Commission of the Republic of Kazakhstan in Astana city. At present he is a member of CEC of the Republic of Kazakhstan as a political office employee.

As a member of the Kazakhstan delegation he has repeatedly polemicized with representatives of the OSCE in Warsaw, Poland. Sarsembaev is also a member of the editorial boards of the Moscow Journal of International Law, Kazakhstan Journal of International Law, Bulletin of L. N. Gumilyov Eurasian National University, and Bulletin of D. A. Kunaev Eurasian Law Academy.

== Personal life ==
Sarsembaev has two brothers, Talgat and Каirat, and two sisters, Zhamal and Kamal. He and his wife Umsynkul have 3 sons Kanat, Timur, and Daniyar.

Sarsembaev speaks Kazakh, Russian, and English fluently.

== Accolades ==
- Honorable citizen of El Paso (Texas, United States)
- Honorable citizen of Houston (Texas, United States)
- Ten years of Independence of the Republic of Kazakhstan medal
- Astana medal
- Ten years of the Constitution of the Republic of Kazakhstan medal
- Ерен енбегі үшін medal (or honorable labor)

== Written works ==
Sarsembaev has more than 440 works in the Kazakh, Russian, Dari, English, French, German, Hebrew, Кorean, Polish, Romanian, Turkish, and Japanese languages on Kazakhstan and foreign and international law. These works have been published in Kazakhstan, the Russian Federation, Afghanistan, Austria, Germany, Great Britain, Israel, Japan, Poland, Romania, Turkey, and the United States.

His most notable works include the following 14 monographs, textbooks, and manuals:

- Promoting the world and friendship – Alma-Ata: Kazakhstan, 1984. – 68 p.
- Afghanistan and international law (in Dari) – Kabul: Kabul university, 1987. – 218 p.
- International law in the history of Kazakhstan and Central Asia – Alma-Ata: Ana tili, 1991. – 152 p.
- International law relations of the states of Central Asia – Almaty: Gylym, 1995. – 368 p.
- International law – Almaty: Zheti zhargy, 1996. – 448 p. (in Russian), in 1999 it was published in Ankara, Turkey, in the Turkish language.
- International private law (the editor-in-chief and the coauthor) – Almaty: Gylym, 1996. – 282 p., in 1999 it was published in Ankara in the Turkish language.
- Customs Law – Almaty: Gylym, 1997. – 228 p.
- Prospects of foreign trade activities: law and international experience – Almaty: Gylym, 1998. – 310 p.
- Diplomatic and consular law – Almaty: Daneker, 1999. – 298 p.
- Relations of Russia (USSR) and Kazakhstan with Afghanistan – Almaty: Daneker, 2002. – 212 p.
- International space law and the Republic of Kazakhstan – Almaty: L.Gumilev Eurasian national university, Daneker, 2003. – 182 p. and others.
