= Pandora Film =

German film production company

Pandora Film, or Pandora Filmproduktion, is a German film production and distribution company, founded by Karl Baumgartner and Reinhard Brundig.

== Filmography (production) ==
- 1995: Dead Man by Jim Jarmusch
- 1996: Walking and Talking by Nicole Holofcener
- 1998: Black Cat, White Cat by Emir Kusturica
- 1998: Full Moon by Fredi M. Murer
- 1999: Luna Papa by Bakhtiar Khudojnazarov
- 1999: Pola X by Leos Carax
- 2001: Mostly Martha by Sandra Nettelbeck
- 2001: Super 8 Stories by Emir Kusturica
- 2003: Spring, Summer, Fall, Winter... and Spring by Kim Ki-duk
- 2003: The Suit by Bakhtyar Khudojnazarov
- 2006: Valley of Flowers by Pan Nalin
- 2007: O' Horten by Bent Hamer
- 2008: Tulpan by Sergey Dvortsevoy
- 2009: 35 Shots of Rum by Claire Denis
- 2013: Only Lovers Left Alive by Jim Jarmusch
- 2015: Sky by Fabienne Berthaud
- 2018: High Life by Claire Denis
- 2024: Pepe by Nelson Carlos De Los Santos Arias
- TBA : A Winter's Journey by Alex Helfrecht
