= Älibek Baqaev =

Kazakh politician and diplomat (born 1981)

- Әлібек Бақаев
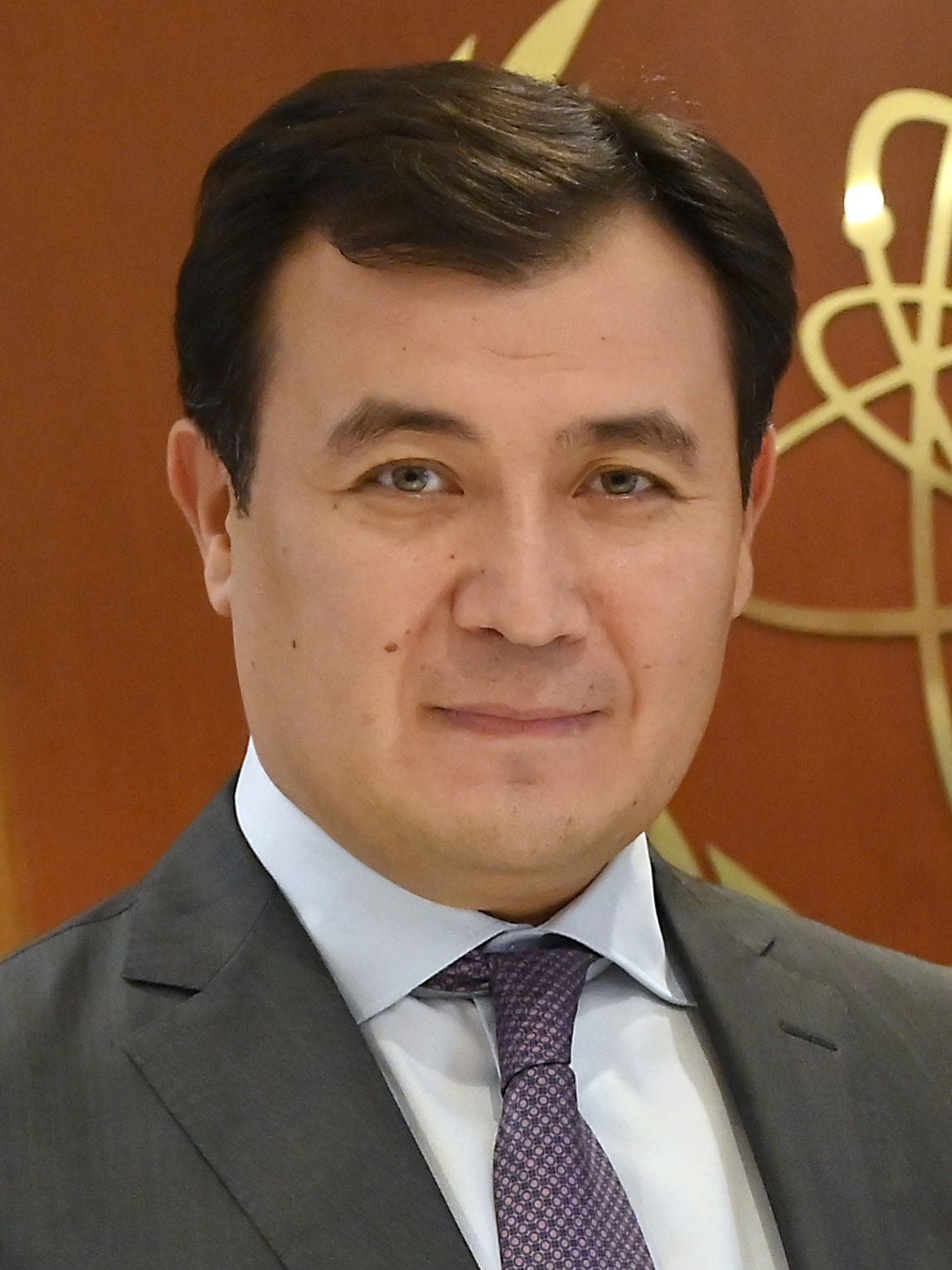
- Baqaev in 2022

Kazakh Ambassador to the United Kingdom
- Incumbent
- Assumed office 22 July 2026
- President: Kassym-Jomart Tokayev
- Preceded by: Magzhan Ilyassov

Deputy Minister of Foreign Affairs
- In office 25 August 2023 – 22 July 2026
- President: Kassym-Jomart Tokayev
- Minister: Murat Nurtileu; Ermek Köşerbaev

Kazakh Ambassador to Slovenia
- In office 24 March 2023 – 25 August 2023
- President: Kassym-Jomart Tokayev
- Preceded by: Kairat Umarov
- Succeeded by: Daniar Särekenov

Kazakh Ambassador to Austria
- In office 21 October 2022 – 25 August 2023
- President: Kassym-Jomart Tokayev
- Preceded by: Kairat Umarov
- Succeeded by: Mukhtar Tleuberdi

Kazakh Ambassador to Switzerland, Liechtenstein, Vatican, Order of Malta, Rhodes and Malta
- In office 4 September 2019 – 21 October 2022
- President: Kassym-Jomart Tokayev
- Preceded by: Zhanar Aitzhanova
- Succeeded by: Qairat Sarjanov

Personal details
- Born: 9 February 1981 (age 45) Almaty, Kazakh SSR, Soviet Union
- Children: 3
- Education: Heidelberg University; Kazakh State University of International Relations and World Languages; Academy of Public Administration; Duke University

Älibek Äsetūly Baqaev (Note: Often transliterated as Alibek Asetovich Bakaev or Bakayev through a Russified Romanization of Алибек Асетович Бакаев.) (Kazakh: Әлібек Әсетұлы Бақаев; born 9 February, 1981) is a Kazakh politician and diplomat serving as Ambassador to the United Kingdom since 2026. Previously, he served as ambassador to Switzerland and Austria.

== Early life and education ==
Alibek Asetuly Baqaev was born on February 9, 1981, in Almaty, Kazakh Soviet Socialist Republic, Soviet Union (now Kazakhstan).

In 2001, Alibek Baqaev graduated from the Heidelberg University in Germany and in 2002, graduated with honors from the Kazakh State University of International Relations and World Languages in Almaty specializing as a simultaneous interpreter. He studied at the Academy of Public Administration under the president of Kazakhstan received a degree in political scientist in 2011, and completed the Senior Executives in Public Policy program at Duke University.

== Career ==
After graduating from the Kazakh State University of International Relations and World Languages in 2002, Alibek Baqaev's first job was as a senior specialist at the insurance company TransOil. He then served as commercial director at the company Zamandastar.

Baqaev began his diplomatic career in 2004 at the Ministry of Foreign Affairs, working as a referent in the Department of Europe and America. In August 2004 he was posted to Kazakhstan's Embassy in Germany as an attaché. After four years abroad, in 2008 Baqaev transferred to the Ministry of Economy and Budget Planning, first as adviser to the minister on international affairs and later as chief of protocol. When that ministry was reorganised in 2010 into the Ministry of Economic Development and Trade, Baqaev headed the Department of International Relations and subsequently the Department of Strategic Planning and Analysis.

In May 2012, Baqaev returned to the Foreign Affairs Ministry to lead the Office of Asian Dialogue Forums in the Department of Central Asian Cooperation. He was appointed deputy director of the Department of Central Asian Cooperation in 2013 and became its director in 2015.

On September 4, 2019, by president Kassym-Jomart Tokayev's decree Alibek Baqaev was appointed ambassador of Kazakhstan to Switzerland. On January 29, 2020 he was concurrently appointed ambassador to Liechtenstein, Vatican, Order of Malta, Rhodes and Malta.

He was relieved of all posts by Tokayev's decree on October 21, 2022 and by the same decree Alibek Baqaev was appointed ambassador to Austria and permanent representative to international organizations in Vienna. On March 24, 2023 he was concurrently appointed ambassador to Slovenia.

After 5 months, on August 14, 2023, Baqaev was relieved of his posts by and after 9 days, on August 23, was appointed deputy minister of foreign affairs Murat Nurtileu.

On July 22, 2026, Baqaev was relieved of his post and appointed ambassador to the United Kingdom, a position that had been vacant since October 2025 following Magzhan Ilyassov's departure.

== Personal life ==
Alibek Baqaev is married and has three children. He speaks Kazakh, Russian, English and German languages.

== Honors and awards ==
- Diplomatic rank of II class Envoy Extraordinary and Plenipotentiary
