= Dinmukhamed =

Dinmukhamed or Dinmukhamet (Kazakh: Дінмұхаммед) is a Kazakh masculine given name, its short version is Dimash. It may refer to

== Dinmukhamed ==
- Dinmukhamet Akhimov (born 1948), Kazakh actor, better known as Dimash
- Dinmukhamed Kunayev (1912–1993), Kazakh Soviet politician

== Dimash ==
- Dimash Kudaibergen (born 1994), Kazakh singer
