= List of ambassadors of Kazakhstan to the United Kingdom =

Ambassador of Kazakhstan to the United Kingdom

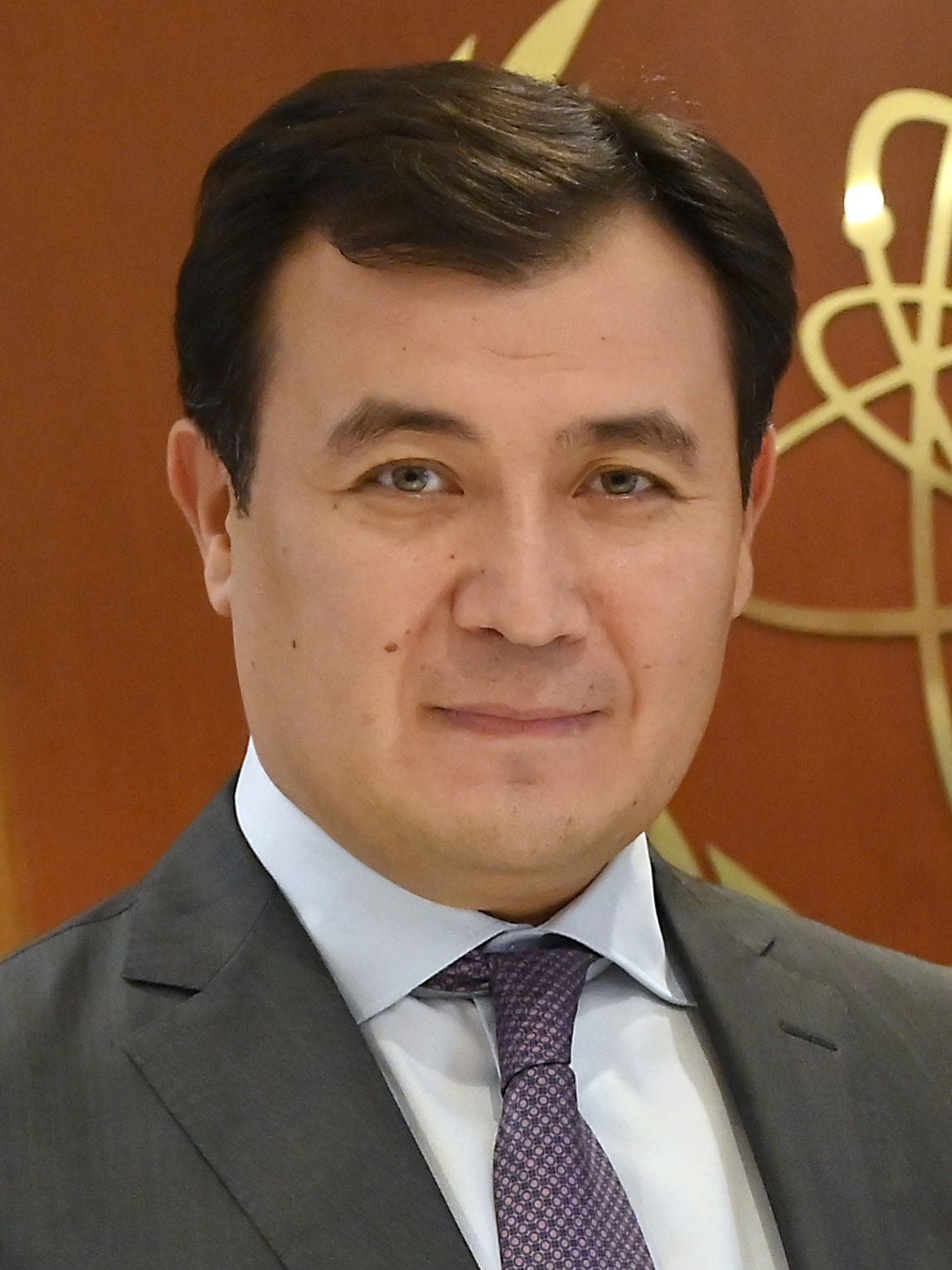
- Incumbent; Älibek Baqaev since 22 July 2026
- Ministry of Foreign Affairs
- Appointer: President of Kazakhstan
- Formation: 9 November 1995
- Website: Official website

The ambassador extraordinary and plenipotentiary of Kazakhstan to the United Kingdom (Kazakh: Қазақстанның Ұлыбританиядағы төтенше және өкілетті елшісі) is the official representative of the president and the government of Kazakhstan to the government of the United Kingdom. The diplomatic relations between the two countries were established on 19 January 1992 while the Kazakh Embassy was opened in February 1996. The current ambassador is Älibek Baqaev, who has been serving since 22 July 2026.

== List of ambassadors ==
- Nurtai Abykayev (9 November 1995 – 7 September 1996)
- Kanat Saudabayev (14 November 1996 – 13 October 1999)
- Adil Ahmetov (28 April 2000 – November 2001)
- Erlan Idrissov (14 June 2002 – 4 July 2007)
- Qairat Abuisetov (17 January 2008 – 17 September 2014)
- Erzhan Kazykhanov (17 September 2014 – 15 February 2017)
- Erlan Idrissov (30 December 2016 – 17 August 2022)
- Magzhan Ilyassov (6 October 2022 – 20 October 2025)
- Älibek Baqaev (since 22 July 2026)

== See also ==
- Kazakhstan–United Kingdom relations
- List of ambassadors of the United Kingdom to Kazakhstan
