= Kosh ba kosh =

Kosh Ba Kosh
- Directed by: Bakhtyar Khudojnazarov
- Screenplay by: Bakhtyar Khudojnazarov; Leonid Mahkamov
- Produced by: Bakhtyar Khudojnazarov
- Starring: Daler Madjidav; Paulina Galvez
- Music by: Achmad Bakaev
- Production companies: Pandora Film; Paradis Films
- Release date: 1993
- Running time: 95 minutes
- Countries: Tajikistan; Russia; Germany; Switzerland; Japan
- Languages: Tajik; Russian

Kosh Ba Kosh (Russian: Кош-ба-кош), also known as Odd and Even, is a 1993 Russian-Tajik film directed by Bakhtyar Khudojnazarov. It won a Silver Lion at the 50th Venice International Film Festival

== Plot summary ==
In 1993, a young Tajik woman named Mira returns to her hometown Dushanbe after living in Russia in the early years following the collapse of the Soviet Union. Upon her arrival, she learns that her father has gambled her away to an old man, Ibrohim, who is eagerly claiming his prize. Mira goes into hiding while the Tajik Civil War rages outside. She meets and falls in love with Daler, the local cable car driver.

== Filming location ==
The film was shot in the Tajik capital, Dushanbe, and was overshadowed by the gunfire of the civil war that broke out during filming.

== Cast ==
- Daler Madjidav as Daler
- Paulina Galvez as Mira
- Alisher Kasimov as Farhad
- Bokhodur Djurabajev as Mira's father
- Radzhab Khuseynov as Ibrohim

== Awards ==
- Venice Film Festival 1993: Silver Lion (Best Director)
