= Village Escape. Love Affair =

2015 Kazakh comedy film

- Russian: Побег из Аула. Операция Махаббат
- Directed by: Nurtas Adambay
- Written by: Nurtas Adambay
- Produced by: Nurtas Adambay
- Starring: Nurtas Adambay; Arujan Jazilbekova; Dinmuhamet Ahimov; Erlan Qasymjanuly; Jan Izbasar
- Cinematography: Azamat Dulatov
- Release date: 26 November 2015 (Kazakhstan)
- Country: Kazakhstan
- Languages: Russian and Kazakh

Village Escape. Love Affair (Russian: Побег из Аула. Операция Махаббат) (Note: Махаббат here being Kazakh for Love) is a 2015 Kazakh comedy film and sequel to the Village Escape series. The writer, producer and director of the movie, Nurtas Adambay, plays the main character Erbol. In the movie, Erbol, alongside his four best friends, escapes the auyl to the city, and attempts to marry a wealthy woman.

== Production ==
The writer, producer, and main actor of the movie is Nurtas Adambay. Village Escape. Love Affair is based and is the sequel of the Village Escape series, which concluded in 2013. The filming, which took place in Almaty, was reported to have taken only took 22 days. The cinematography was done by Azamat Dulatov.

== Plot ==
Financial hardships force five best friends to escape from the auyl and move to the city. There, they decide to marry Erbol (Nurtas Adambay) to engaged member of a wealthy dynasty, Aisūlu (Arujan Jazilbekova). Having stolen a Rolls-Royce from an unsuspecting criminal boss Būzaubas, they now have to deal with the criminal world, the lies to Aisūlu, and her rich groom.

The main characters and leading actors of the Village Escape series return to their respective roles, including Erbol (Nurtas Adambay), Sapog (Jan Izbasar), Erlan (Erlan Qasymjanuly), Baklazhan and Tyşqan.

== Cast ==
The cast of Village Escape. Love Affair includes Nurtas Adambay, Arujan Jazylbekova, Maxim Akbarov, Erlan Qasymjanuly, Jan Izbasar, and Dinmuhamet Ahimov.

== Release ==
The movie's early screening took place on 23 November 2015. Its release around the country was on 26 November 2015. The movie was said to be a box office success, much like the movie Bride Sabina.
