= Yeo-jin =

- Hangul: 여진
- RR: Yeojin
- MR: Yŏjin
- IPA: [jʌd͡ʑin]

Yeo-jin is a Korean given name.

== People ==
People with this name include:

- Hong Yeo-jin (born 1958), South Korean actress
- Kim Yeo-jin (born 1972), South Korean actress
- Yeojin Bae (born 1975), South Korean-born Australian fashion designer
- Choi Yeo-jin (born 1983), South Korean-born Canadian actress
- Jeon Yeo-jin (born Jeon Ji-ae, 1984), South Korean actress
- Ha Yeo-jin (born 1986), South Korean actress
- Yeojin (born Im Yeo-jin, 2002), South Korean singer, member of girl group Loona

Fictional characters with this name include:

- Gook Yeo-jin, in 2014 South Korean television series Cunning Single Lady
- Han Yeo-jin, in 2017-2020 South Korean television series Stranger (TV series)

== See also ==
- List of Korean given names
