= Luna Papa =

- Directed by: Bakhtyar Khudojnazarov
- Screenplay by: Bakhtyar Khudojnazarov; Irakli Kvirikadze
- Produced by: Heinz Stussak; Igor Tolstunow; Thomas Koerfer; Karl Baumgartner; Philippe Avril
- Starring: Chulpan Khamatova; Moritz Bleibtreu; Nikolay Fomenko
- Music by: Daler Nazarov
- Production companies: Pandora Film; Paradis Films
- Release date: 1999
- Running time: 109 minutes
- Countries: Russia; Tajikistan; Uzbekistan; Germany; Austria; France
- Language: Russian

Luna Papa (Russian: Лунный папа) is a 1999 movie by Bakhtyar Khudojnazarov with collaboration from Russia, Tajikistan, Germany, Austria and France.

== Plot summary ==
17-year-old Mamlakat lives with her father Safar, who raises rabbits, and mentally disabled brother Nasreddin in an unpaved lakeside village in Tajikistan. She works in a restaurant and dreams of becoming an actress. A travelling theatre company visits the nearby city but she misses the performance and wanders for a while. She chances upon an aircraft pilot, Yassir, who pretends to be an actor and a friend of a famous American actor. He promises to help her become an actress, but instead seduces her while she is in a dream-like fantasy, leaving the village immediately afterwards.

When she discovers that she is pregnant, she has no idea how this happened and who the father is. Determined to preserve her and their honour, her eccentric family sets out on a comic journey in order to find the unborn child's father and to force him to marry her. During this journey - in an old car loaded with rabbits - they travel through Uzbekistan, Tajikistan, and Kyrgyzstan. The family meets various bandits and the charming impostor Alik, who poses as the seducer in the dark, and falls in love with Mamlakat.

== Cast ==
- Chulpan Khamatova as Mamlakat
- Moritz Bleibtreu as Nasreddin
- Ato Mukhamedzhanov as Safar
- Merab Ninidze as Alik
- Polina Rajkina as Khabibula (voice only)
- Nikolay Fomenko as Yassir
- Dinmukhamet Akhimov as the gynaecologist
- Sherali Abdulkajsov as Akbar

== Filming location ==
The film was shot in Kairakum, in north-western Tajikistan.

== Awards ==
The film received the main prize "Golden Rose" at Kinotavr in 2000.

At the 2000 Russian Guild of Film Critics Awards the picture was awarded the prizes for Best Film and Best Director (Bakhtyar Khudojnazarov).

== See also ==
- List of submissions to the 72nd Academy Awards for Best Foreign Language Film
- List of Tajikistani submissions for the Academy Award for Best Foreign Language Film
- Waiting for the Sea
