= Spring, Summer, Fall, Winter... and Spring =

2003 film

- Film poster
- Hangul: 봄 여름 가을 겨울 그리고 봄
- RR: Bom yeoreum gaeul gyeoul geurigo bom
- MR: Pom yŏrŭm kaŭl kyŏul kŭrigo pom
- Directed by: Kim Ki-duk
- Written by: Kim Ki-duk
- Produced by: Karl Baumgartner; Lee Seung-jae
- Starring: O Yeong-su; Kim Ki-duk; Kim Young-min; Seo Jae-kyung; Park Ji-a; Ha Yeo-jin; Kim Jong-ho
- Cinematography: Baek Dong-hyun
- Edited by: Kim Ki-duk
- Music by: Park Ji-woong
- Production companies: LJ Film; Pandora Film
- Distributed by: Cineclick Asia (South Korea); Bavaria Film (Germany)
- Release date: 19 September 2003
- Running time: 103 minutes
- Countries: South Korea; Germany
- Language: Korean
- Box office: $9.53 million

Spring, Summer, Fall, Winter... and Spring (Korean: 봄 여름 가을 겨울 그리고 봄) is a 2003 drama film directed by Kim Ki-duk about a Buddhist monastery that floats on a lake in a pristine forest. An international co-production of South Korea and Germany, the story is about the life of a Buddhist monk as he passes through the seasons of his life, from childhood to old age.

The film stars O Yeong-su, Kim Young-min, Seo Jae-kyung and Yeo-jin Ha. The director himself appears as the man in the last stage of life. The film was released in the United States in 2004 by Sony Pictures Classics, in subtitle format. It received widespread critical acclaim.

== Synopsis ==
The film is divided into five segments (the titular seasons), each segment depicting a stage in the life of a novice Buddhist monk and his older teacher. The segments are roughly 10 to 20 years apart, and the action of each takes place during the season in question. The story unfolds rather simply, but the implications of the characters' actions are silently commented upon by the presence of Buddhist symbols and iconography.

=== Spring ===
A young Buddhist apprentice lives with his master in a small floating monastery, drifting on a lake in the serene forested mountains of Korea. The boy and his master live a life of prayer and meditation, using an old rowboat to reach the bank of the lake, where they regularly go walking for exercise and to collect herbs. In this part of the film, the animal owned by the monastery is a dog, a Buddhist symbol of fidelity to one's master.

One day, in a creek among the rocky hills, the apprentice torments a fish by tying a small stone to it with string and laughing as it struggles to swim. Shortly after, he does the same to a frog and a snake; his master quietly observes all three occasions, and that night he ties a large, smooth rock to the apprentice as he sleeps. In the morning, he tells his apprentice that he cannot take off the rock until he unties the creatures he tormented—adding that if any of them have died, he will "carry the stone in his heart forever". The boy struggles with the load on his back through the forest and finds the fish lying dead at the bottom of the creek, the frog still alive and struggling where he left it, and the snake in a pool of blood, presumably attacked and killed by another animal, unable to get away. The master watches as the boy begins to cry heavily at seeing what he has done to the snake.

=== Summer ===
The apprentice, now a teenager, encounters a mother and daughter dressed in modern clothes, indicating that the film takes place in modern times, walking along the forest path to look for the monastery. The apprentice silently greets and rows them across the lake to the monastery, where a colorful rooster is now part of the household. In Buddhist art, this bird is the representation of desire and craving. The daughter has an unspecified illness, displaying symptoms of a fever, and her mother brings her to the master in the hope of healing her. The master agrees to take in the teenage girl for a time, and the mother leaves. Over the next few days, the apprentice gets sexually attracted to the girl but is too shy to say anything; however, when he finds her sleeping in front of the Buddha statue, he gropes her breast. She wakes up and slaps him. In a guilty panic, the apprentice begins to pray incessantly, something his master notes as strange. Touching the apprentice's shoulder, the girl seems to forgive him.

Eventually, the two wander off into the forest and have sex. They repeat the act over the next few nights, hiding their relationship from the master, until he discovers them asleep and naked, drifting around the lake in the rowboat. He wakes them up by pulling the plug out of a drain hole in the boat. Rather than expressing anger or disappointment, he merely warns his apprentice that "lust leads to a desire for possession and possession leads to murder" and says the girl must leave since she has recovered from her illness. After the master rows the girl ashore the following morning, the apprentice is distraught and runs away that night in pursuit of her, taking the monastery's Buddha statue and the rooster with him. The implications of his two thefts are that while burdened with his craving as symbolized by the bird, he also has with him the "burden" of his master's teachings, as symbolized by the Buddha statue.

=== Fall ===
Many years later in fall, the aging master returns from a supply run to a nearby village, bringing a cat in his backpack.

By chance, he glimpses a story about his former apprentice in a newspaper: He is wanted for the murder of his wife. Foreseeing his protege's return, he modifies the teenage monk's garments by hand, and soon afterward, the apprentice appears at the spiritual door at the lake's edge, full of anger and carrying the bloodstained knife with which he stabbed his wife for having an affair with another man. Unwilling to live, he seals his eyes, mouth and nose in a suicide ritual (after brushing the Chinese character for "closed" on each of the seals) and sits in front of the newly returned Buddha statue, waiting for death. The master discovers him and beats him ruthlessly, declaring that while he may have killed his wife, he will not kill himself so easily. He ties his bloodied apprentice to the ceiling and sets a candle to slowly burn through the rope, then begins writing out the "Heart Sutra" on the monastery deck, holding the cat in his arms and dipping its tail into a bowl of black ink. The apprentice eventually falls and, beginning his repentance, cuts his hair off and is ordered to carve the Chinese characters into the wood to quiet his heart.

Two detectives arrive at the monastery to arrest the apprentice, but the master asks them to allow him until the next day to finish his task. The apprentice continues throughout the night and collapses into sleep immediately upon finishing. Influenced by the soothing presence of the master, the detectives help the old monk paint his apprentice's carvings in orange, green, blue and purple. This appears to quiet their hearts as well.

The apprentice wakes up and is peacefully taken away by the detectives, with the cat accompanying them in the back of the boat. In Buddhism, "the body of the cat is the temporary resting place of the soul of very spiritual people". When the monk brings back the cat (before he has gained information about the former apprentice), it demonstrates that at his advanced age, he has, in his solitude, achieved some form of inner peace and foreshadows his death. When the cat leaves with the apprentice, it perhaps symbolizes the monk's dying wish - that the apprentice finds inner peace as well. After they leave, the master, knowing that his life is at its end, builds a pyre in the rowboat. He seals shut his ears, eyes, nose and mouth with paper in the same death ritual his apprentice performed, and he meditates while suffocating and burning to death. The master's tears can be seen through the paper seals as he is engulfed in flame and a snake swims from the rowboat to the monastery.

=== Winter ===
The now middle-aged apprentice returns to the frozen lake and former home, which has been drifting uninhabited for years. During this segment, the animal motif is the snake, the Buddhist symbol of anger. He finds his master's clothes, laid out just before his death, and digs his master's teeth out of the frozen rowboat. He carves a statue of the Buddha out of ice, wraps his master's "sarira" (small crystals sometimes found among cremated remains of monks and considered sacred relics) in red cloth, and sets them in the statue where the "third eye" would be located, under a waterfall. He finds a book of choreographic meditative stances and begins to train and exercise in the freezing weather.

Eventually, a woman comes to the monastery with her baby son and a shawl wrapped around her face. She leaves her son and flees into the night, but as she runs across the frozen lake, she accidentally falls into a hole in the ice dug by the monk. Finding her body the next day, he removes her from the water to look at her face, though it remains hidden on screen. Instead, in the next shot, the scarf is open on the ice and a carved stone head of Buddha is sitting on it.

Finally completing his long self-discipline, he ties to his body the monastery's large, circular grinding stone emblematic of the Buddhist Bhavacakra, the wheel of life and rebirth. He takes a statue of the Buddha to come, Maitreya, from the monastery and climbs to the summit of the tallest of the surrounding mountains. As he climbs, dragging the stone wheel behind him and struggling to carry the statue, he reflects on the fish, frog and snake he tormented. Attaining the summit, he prays and leaves the statue seated on top of the circular grinding stone, overlooking the monastery in the lake far below.

=== ...and Spring ===
Returning to spring again, the cycle recommences. The new master lives in the monastery with the abandoned baby, now a young boy and his apprentice. The boy is shown tormenting a turtle in front of the monastery, ominously a traditional symbol of longevity and prognosticating the future. Wandering into the same rocky hills his master had in his boyhood, the giggling boy echoes his predecessor by forcing stones into the mouths of a fish, frog, and snake (these last scenes were deleted in the U.S. release of the movie). A final image shows the Buddha statue on top of the mountain looking down over the lake.

== Production ==
Director Kim Ki-duk said of the film: "I intended to portray the joy, anger, sorrow and pleasure of our lives through four seasons and through the life of a monk who lives in a temple on Jusan Pond surrounded only by nature."

=== Set ===
"The hermitage that is the stage for Spring, Summer, Fall, Winter... and Spring is an artificially constructed set made to float on top of Jusanji Pond in Cheongsong County, North Gyeongsang Province, South Korea. Created about 200 years ago, Jusanji Pond (36°21′45.70″N 129°11′22.91″E) is an artificial lake in which the surrounding mountains are reflected in its waters. It retains the mystical aura of having trees more than one hundred years old still growing along its shores. LJ Film was able to obtain permission to build the set after finally convincing the Ministry of Environment through six months of negotiations."

== Reception ==
Spring, Summer, Fall, Winter... and Spring was acclaimed by film critics. On the review aggregator website Rotten Tomatoes, 94% of 98 critics' reviews are positive, with an average rating of 8/10. The website's consensus reads: "A visually stunning and contemplative piece of work." Metacritic, which uses a weighted average, assigned the film a score of 85 out of 100, based on 29 critics, indicating "universal acclaim". Peter Rainer of New York praised the film's "tranquil beauty" and argued, "Kim exalts nature—life's passage—without stooping to sentimentality. He sees the tooth and claw, and he sees the transcendence. Whether this is a Buddhist attribute, I cannot say, but the impression this movie leaves is profound: Here is an artist who sees things whole." James Berardinelli wrote that the film's pace "is deliberate, but there is too much richness in the movie's emotional tapestry for it to be considered dull or drawn-out. [...] The film raises questions about how we live our lives and how actions, like ripples in the waters of time, can have unexpected consequences years later." Berardinelli also stated that the "perfectly composed shots [amplified] an emotionally resonant story".

Roger Ebert included the film in his Great Movies list in 2009, writing, "The film in its beauty and serenity becomes seductive and fascinating. [...] There is little or no dialogue, no explanations, no speeches with messages. [Ki-duk] descends upon lives that have long since taken their form. If conflict comes, his characters will in some way bring it upon themselves, or within themselves. That causes us to pay closer attention."

In a 2016 international critics' poll conducted by the BBC, Spring, Summer, Fall, Winter... and Spring was voted one of the 100 greatest motion pictures since 2000. In 2020, The Guardian ranked it number five among the classics of modern South Korean cinema.

The film was selected as South Korea's official submission for the Academy Award for Best Foreign Language Film at the 76th Academy Awards.

== Music ==
The traditional song used near the end of the film, while the adult monk is climbing the mountain, is called "Jeongseon Arirang", sung by Kim Young-im. The film score was composed by Ji Bark.

== Controversy ==
A sequence was excised from the international version of the film, likely due to its animal cruelty.

== See also ==
- Culture of South Korea
- List of submissions to the 76th Academy Awards for Best Foreign Language Film
- List of South Korean submissions for the Academy Award for Best International Feature Film
