= Taraz (film) =

2016 Kazakh crime drama film

- Theatrical release poster
- Directed by: Nurtas Adambay
- Written by: Nurtas Adambay
- Starring: Nurtas Adambay; Asan Mäjit; Erkebulan Daiyrov; Gülnaz Jolanova; Tölepbergen Baisaqalov; Jandos Aibasov
- Production company: Nurtas Production
- Release date: 13 October 2016 (Kazakhstan)
- Country: Kazakhstan
- Languages: Russian and Kazakh
- Budget: $400,000

Taraz (Russian: Тараз, lit. 'Taraz') is a 2016 Kazakh crime drama film by Nurtas Adambay. This is Adambay's first drama movie; he was previously only known as a comedy writer and actor.

== Background ==
Creator Nurtas Adambay spoke of always wanting to make a film based on his home city, Taraz. Adambay, who was until the film notable only for comedy films, said that when choosing the chosen genre, he noted that Taraz is "not the kind of city that should be made into a comedy".

== Production ==
The film's budget was $400,000, double the budget of Adambay's other film, Bride Sabina (2014). Nurtas Adambay noted that switching from comedy to drama was not challenging.

== Cast ==
Director Nurtas Adambay also played the main character. Among the rest of the cast were Asan Mäjit, Erkebulan Daiyrov, Gülnaz Jolanova, Tölepbergen Baisaqalov, Jandos Aibasov, Kämşat Joldybaeva, Nurjan Sädibekov, Marat Abdullaev, and Äşim Ahmetov.

== Plot ==
The plot follows three childhood friends, Asan, Aidar, and Sapar. It takes place in Kazakhstan's then-most criminal city, Taraz. The movie's opening scene features a brawl in a night club featuring a drunk local crime leader, which leaves Asan's mother mourning, Sapar's son orphaned, and Aidar unmarried and unsuccessful.

Adambay denied that the plot was based on actual events. He did, however, mention that two of the main characters were loosely based on his friends from Taraz.

== Release ==
The movie had a closed premiere night in Almaty on 12 October 2016. The nationwide release took place the next day.
