= The Suit (2003 film) =

- Directed by: Bakhtyar Khudojnazarov
- Screenplay by: Oleg Antonov (Playwright)
- Produced by: Ruben Dishdishyan; Bakhtyar Khudojnazarov; Karl Baumgartner
- Starring: Artur Smolyaninov; Ingeborga Dapkūnaitė; Andrei Panin; Nikolai Fomenko
- Music by: Daler Nazarov
- Production companies: Pandora Film; Paradis Films
- Release date: 2003
- Running time: 92 minutes
- Countries: Russia; Ukraine; Germany; France
- Language: Russian

The Suit (Russian: Шик) is a 2003 film by Bakhtyar Khudojnazarov with collaboration from Russia, Ukraine, Germany and France. The film script is written by Oleg Antonov and is a free adaptation of Ray Bradbury's 1958 short story The Wonderful Ice Cream Suit.

== Plot summary ==
Three young men living in a small coastal town on the Black Sea spend their time wandering around aimlessly. One day, they discover a black, pinstriped Gucci suit displayed in a shop window in the big city, accessible only by ferry. They become fixated on acquiring the suit, seeing it as a symbol of success and confidence that could transform them into respected adults. After a series of attempts, they manage to obtain the suit and decide to take turns wearing it, each hoping it will improve their lives.

Shtyr dons the suit to elevate his image, slipping into a luxury cruise ship's champagne reception and later trying to reconnect with his estranged father, a sophisticated tailor who abandoned the family. Geka wears the suit to gain respect from his stepmother Asya, who seems to be cheating on his father; torn between disgust at her behavior and an uncomfortable attraction, he tries to win her approval. Mute, meanwhile, uses the suit to impress Dina, a beautiful Jewish fishmonger he's infatuated with, only to find that she's using him to fend off an unwanted admirer, Artur. In the end, each of the boys' attempts to improve their lives with the suit leads to disappointment and tragedy.

== Filming location ==
The Suit was shot in the Crimea in the cities of Sevastopol and Jalta and the surrounding areas. The opening scene takes place in the cave fortress of Inkerman.

== Cast ==
- Ivan Kokorin as Mute
- Aleksandr Yatsenko as Shtyr
- Artur Smolyaninov as Geka
- Ingeborga Dapkūnaitė as Asya
- Ruslana Rukhadze as Dina
- Andrei Panin as Platon (Shtyr's father)
- Elena Drobysheva as Shtyr's mother
- Nikolai Fomenko as Botya
- Inna Sukharev as Mona Lisa (Botya's playmate)
- Aleksandr Donskoy as Edik

== Release ==
The premiere of Shik was on February 9, 2003, at the Berlinale Talents in Germany. In Russia, the film was first shown on 23 July 2003 at the Moscow International Film Festival.

== Awards ==
- 2002 Sochi Grand Prize (Best Russian Film)
- 2003 Tokyo Special Jury Prize: Best Artistic Contribution
