= Akim (film) =

2019 Kazakh comedy film

- Theatrical release poster
- Russian: Аким
- Directed by: Nurtas Adambay
- Written by: Nurtas Adambay
- Produced by: Nurtas Adambay
- Starring: Nurtas Adambay; Jan Baijanbaev; Gülnar Dosmatova; Qairat Ädilgerei
- Cinematography: Azamat Dulatov
- Music by: Alexander Shevchenko
- Production company: Nurtas Production
- Release date: 7 November 2019 (Kazakhstan)
- Running time: 110 minutes
- Country: Kazakhstan
- Languages: Russian and Kazakh

Akim (Russian: Аким, lit. 'akim') is a 2019 Kazakh comedy film. The writer, producer and director of the movie Nurtas Adambay plays the main character Azamat. In the movie, Azamat, a son of a wealthy state official, is appointed as akim of a small Kazakh village, and is then forced to get used to the rural lifestyle.

== Production ==
According to creator Nurtas Adambay, the filming of Akim only took 16–17 days. As reported by Kazinform, it took place in one of the villages 300 kilometres (190 mi) from Almaty. The movie is in both Russian and Kazakh.

According to Adambay himself, the title idea came from former Äkim of Shymkent Ğabidolla Äbdırahimov, though the plot concept was greatly reworked. This was Adambay's seventh work.

== Cast ==
The cast of Akim included Nurtas Adambay, Jan Baijanbaev, Gulnar Dosmatova, Qairat Adilgerei, Marat Dostaev, Aşim Ahmetov, Darhan Daiyrbek, Aiym Seitmetova, Gülnaz Jolanova, and Ashat Ahmetov.

== Plot ==
Resident of Nur-Sultan, Azamat (Nurtas Adambay) is appointed by his wealthy official father (Jan Baijanbaev) as akim in the fictional Tazabulaq District. Throughout the movie, Azamat is forced to get acquainted to the auyl lifestyle and the local residents.

Losing access to the mobile network, Azamat, who doesn't speak Kazakh and is now the Akim of Tazabulaq, faces hardships. In order to be seen as a popular akim, Azamat befriends his neighbour Mağjan and starts taking Kazakh classes from local teacher Gülnaz.

== Release ==
The movie was released on 7 November 2019 throughout Kazakhstan.

== Reception ==
After the release of the political movie Akim, the media speculated on Nurtas Adambay's potential political ambitions, comparing the work to Servant of the People series by Volodymyr Zelenskyy and the latter's then-new political career. Adambay, however, refuted the rumors, stating that he does not intend to run for any political office.
