= Stratosphere Girl =

- Stratosphere Girl film poster
- Directed by: Matthias X. Oberg
- Written by: Matthias X. Oberg
- Produced by: Karl Baumgartner
- Starring: Chloé Winkel, Jon Yang
- Distributed by: TLA Releasing
- Release date: 9 September 2004 (Germany)
- Running time: 90 min
- Languages: English, Dutch, Japanese

Stratosphere Girl (also known as The Stratosphere Girl in the United States) is a 2004 film from Germany written and directed by Matthias X. Oberg.

Stratosphere Girl (2004) is a German coming-of-age drama film directed by Matthias X. Oberg. It follows Angela, a teenage manga artist who travels to Japan to work at an exclusive club catering to wealthy businesspeople, where she becomes embroiled in a murder mystery.

== Plot ==
Teenager Angela (Chloé Winkel), who is skilled at drawing, meets and falls in love with an attractive Japanese DJ. Encouraged by him, she goes to Japan to work at an exclusive club for rich businessmen, who like to meet with young blonde women. From the start, the film is surreal with unique characters, clear and sharp cinematography, and slow panning camera work. Manga drawings are also used to enhance the plot and ambiance.

Angela seeks work at the aforementioned club and, after having been begrudgingly let in, she is met with derision by the other girls working there. However, despite having spurned some of the other girls, she soon proves to be a favorite among the patrons by pretending to be a Lolita-style 15-year-old to please the businessmen.

The plot has a sinister undertone of the possibility of murder of a girl, Larissa, whom Angela has replaced. As the film goes on, we learn Larissa was possibly murdered, not by Japanese men in search of sick sexual fantasy fulfillment, but at the envious and jealous hands of her workmates. In the last scenes we learn Larissa lives and, furthermore, this is when Angela is heralded with the contract to be a Manga artist.
