= Kazakhstan–United Kingdom relations =

- Kazakhstan: United Kingdom

Envoy
- Ambassador Magzhan Ilyassov: Ambassador Sally Axworthy

Kazakhstan–United Kingdom relations were formally established on 19 January 1992. The UK opened an embassy in Kazakhstan in October 1992 and Kazakhstan opened an embassy in the UK in February 1996. Kazakhstan's relations with the West have greatly improved for the last few years as the Government has closely cooperated in the U.S.-led war on terror.

Britain is the third-largest foreign investor in Kazakhstan with British companies making up 14% of foreign direct investment. Over 100 British companies do business in Kazakhstan.

== Kazakh-British Strategic Dialogue ==
The Kazakh-British Strategic Dialogue is a platform for mutual political communication and cooperation. It is chaired by each country's foreign minister.

On 24 April 2024, the two countries signed a Strategic Partnership and Cooperation Agreement, during the visit of British Foreign Secretary, David Cameron, to Astana.

== Economic & trade relations ==
The UK is one of the six largest investors in the Kazakh economy. Foreign direct investment inflow from the UK in 2005-2018 totalled $13 billion (£10.8 billion). British investors and companies have invested US$25 billion into Kazakhstan since 1991. In 2018, the gross inflow of FDI from the UK in Kazakhstan reached $593.1 million, an increase of 11.1% compared to 2017 ($533.8 million). Over 10 years, the influx of direct investment from the UK to Kazakhstan amounted to $8.8 billion. The most attractive industry in Kazakhstan for UK investors is professional, scientific and technical activities; the share of which is 34.3 percent of the total, or $7.8 billion. Investors from the UK also significantly financed financial and insurance activities ($2.4 billion) and mining and quarrying ($1.8 billion).

The UK is also among Kazakhstan's ten largest trading partners. In 2018, mutual trade amounted to $1.2 billion (£1 billion). The main share in the turnover is the export of Kazakh goods and services - 63 percent, or $793.9 million, while imports from the UK reached $466.8 million, or 37 percent.

The UK and Kazakhstan are cooperating to build the supporting infrastructure and commercial activity for the trans-Eurasian transport corridors and the Silk Road corridor. In 2019, two-way trade amounted to $3.2 billion. British companies exported $2.6 billion in goods and services to Kazakhstan and the UK imported $737 million in goods from Kazakhstan. BAE Systems has a 49% stake in Kazakhstan's national airline: Air Astana.

In May 2025, Kazakhstan and the United Kingdom strengthened their economic and trade relations by signing a roadmap for cooperation in agriculture during the 11th meeting of the Kazakhstan-UK Intergovernmental Commission on Trade and Economic Cooperation, held in London. The agreement outlines collaboration in agricultural science, product export and processing, and the transfer of British agricultural technologies. Additionally, memorandums of understanding were signed covering water resource management and biopharmaceutical production in Kazakhstan, including cooperation with AstraZeneca. Deputy Minister of Agriculture Ermek Kenzhekhanuly highlighted the anticipated impact of British technology and investment on Kazakhstan’s agro-industrial sector, which recorded $50 million in agricultural trade with the UK in 2024. Deputy Minister of Foreign Affairs Alibek Kuantyrov noted the UK’s role as a major trading partner and investor, with foreign direct investment surpassing $22 billion.

== Cooperation in digital field ==
The United Kingdom occupies leading positions in the global rankings of developing digital technologies and artificial intelligence. Kazakhstan cooperates with the UK in order to adopt and implement Britain's best practices in the digital field. This is an integral part of the implementation of the Digital Kazakhstan programme, which aims to improve the standard of living in Kazakhstan through the use of digital technologies.

== Cooperation in the law-enforcement field ==
in September 2020, President Kassym-Zhomart Tokayev, announced in his Address to the Nation the transition to the ‘service police model’ with the local police to be based on the principle of the ‘police close at hand’ (politsiya v shagovoi dostupnosti). According to one senior official from the Ministry of Internal Affairs, this model envisions having police precincts within walking distance of local communities and beat cops as authoritative and resourceful managers mobilising communities in solving their local problems. It tries to emulate community safety partnerships, which had been implemented in the UK in the late 1990s under Tony Blair who had been Nazarbayev’s consultant in the 2010s. While very few within the police understood what a ‘service police model’ meant in practice, the Minister of Internal Affairs Erlan Turgymbayev has already reported to President Kassym-Zhomart Tokayev about refurbishing dilapidated police precincts and the building of new ones.

== Meetings and business relations ==
In October 1991, the first-ever visit by the President of the Kazakh SSR, Nursultan Nazarbayev, to the United Kingdom took place, laying the foundation for the dynamic development of bilateral relations.

The first President of Kazakhstan, Nursultan Nazarbayev, visited the United Kingdom on nine occasions, in 1991, 1992, 1994, 1997, 2000, 2006, 2012, 2013, and 2015. During Nazarbayev’s presidency, Kazakhstan was visited by members of the British Royal Family, including the heir to the British throne, Prince Charles (1996); Princess Anne (1993); Prince Richard, Duke of Gloucester (2000 and 2017); the UK’s Special Representative for Trade and Investment, Prince Andrew (2003, 2006, 2007, and 2010); and Prince Michael of Kent (2009).

From 30 June to 1 July 2013, the Prime Minister of the United Kingdom, David Cameron, paid the first state visit in the history of bilateral relations to Kazakhstan. The visit concluded with the adoption of a Joint Statement on Strategic Partnership between the two countries.

Foreign Minister Boris Johnson hosted Kazakh Foreign Minister Kairat Abdrakhmanov in London in November 2017.

Kazakh President Nursultan Nazarbayev appointed Richard Evans, the former chief executive of BAE Systems, head of Samruk, a state-owned holding company that controls five Kazakh companies, on 23 October 2006.

Kazakhstan and the UK steadily advance their economic cooperation through various conferences and intergovernmental forums. One of such forums was held in London in October 2018. Titled as "Kazakhstan Global Investment Forum 2018," the event brought together more than 150 business executives. The outcome of the forum was the conclusion of a number of agreements with British companies in the fields of transport and logistics, metallurgy, energy, agriculture, engineering, and in the field of developing the healthcare system infrastructure.

=== Visit to London ===
President Nazarbayev, along with several Kazakh business leaders, met with Evans, British Prime Minister Tony Blair, Queen Elizabeth II, Chancellor of the Exchequer Gordon Brown, Lord Mayor John Stuttard and Jean Lemierre, the President of the European Bank for Reconstruction and Development, in London, England on 21 and 22 November 2006. Nazarbayev discussed energy cooperation with Prime Minister Blair, and President Lemierre pledged to change the EBRD's relationship with Kazakhstan, taking into account Kazakhstan's strong economic growth. Nazarbayev met with other London business representatives on 22 November, opened trading at the London Stock Exchange, and visited the London Metal Exchange.

Political analysts said Nazarbayev used the visit as an opportunity to try to convince British government officials that Kazakhstan is making progress in its democratization in order to gain Britain's support for its bid to head the Organization for Security and Cooperation in Europe in 2009. The OSCE Ministerial Council is expected to make a decision on the matter in December.

Pauline Shearman, Director of the Confederation of British Industry, said, "As far as we're concerned it's quite timely given that we're focusing quite a lot on energy security these days, and there being various concerns in the EU about long-term total reliance on the Russian energy sector alone... I think the paramount issue still is the political recognition in the world community for Nazarbayev."

=== Press conference ===
Blair and Nazarbayev held a joint press conference after their meeting on 21 November. Blair said, "This relationship is obviously about trade and energy. We are looking now at how we co-operate in the financial services sector. The role of Kazakhstan is increasingly important because it demonstrates that, first, you have a country that, by being prepared to open up its economy, has achieved significant advance – and that's an important lesson. And secondly, you have many different ethnic and religious groupings and they are living together and Kazakhstan is making progress as a whole, as a country, and that's an important lesson as well. Particularly in this region, we need stable partners and I think there is a whole new and different relationship that Europe should have with Kazakhstan where we recognize that strategic importance. And I would like to see Britain be a leading partner of Kazakhstan in that endeavour, not just for trade and economic reasons but for political ones too."

=== Kazakhstan – Way Forward ===
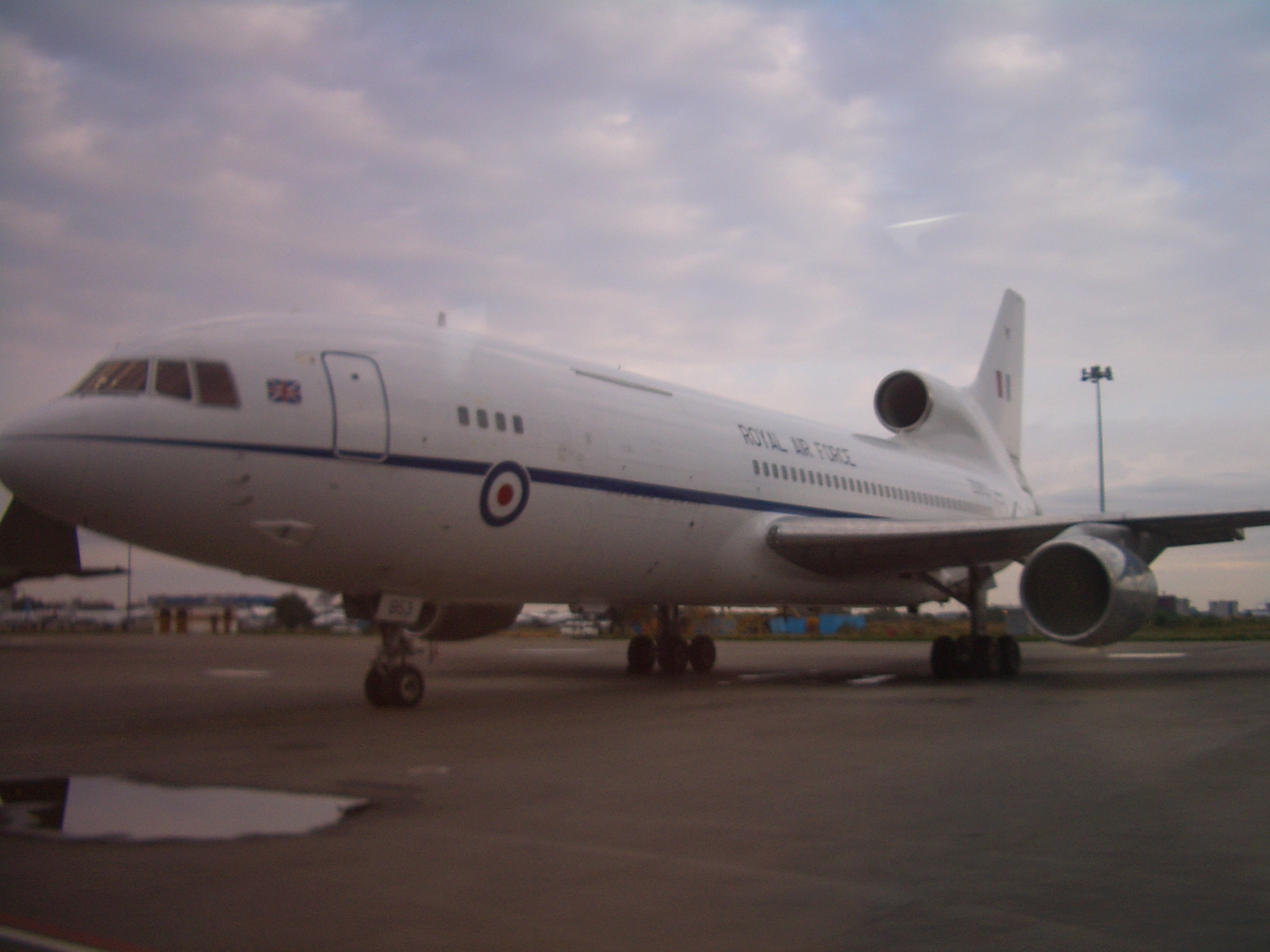
An RAF Lockheed TriStar in Almaty Airport. September 2007

Nazarbayev gave a speech at a business seminar entitled "Kazakhstan– Way Forward," to 300 British businessmen, in which he discussed Kazakhstan's GDP, which is expected to soon pass USD $6,000, that Britain is the third largest investor in Kazakhstan, and that there are 128 British companies currently investing in Kazakhstan. Nazarbayev told his audience, "Kazakhstan is no longer part of the Soviet Union, not part of Russia, and there is no need to look at it as if it were. As you see, Kazakhstan is a scene of liberal politics, liberal economics, and we wish that all the countries of the region would follow our example, walk in our footsteps in that we have created better conditions for our people than our neighbors." Other representatives who spoke at the seminar worked for Kazyna Fund, Samruk State Holdings, RFCA, and the European Bank for Reconstruction and Development.

Martin Ferstl, chairman of Shell Oil in Kazakhstan, said that Shell invested $3 billion in Kazakhstan between 1993 and 2006. He praised the "legal and regulatory framework" for being "clear, unambiguous, and implementable" when it comes to foreign investment. Another speaker, Sauat Mynbayev, acting chairman of Samruk State Holding company, took the opportunity to announce that four companies based in Kazakhstan were going to sell shares on the London Stock Exchange.

=== Hindus in Kazakhstan ===
Prime Minister Blair raised the issue of the treatment of Hindus in Kazakhstan when he met with Nazarbayev as riot police and bulldozers demolished a Hindu temple and five houses of Kazakh Hindus in Karasai District, Kazakhstan. Forum 18, a nonprofit organization that advocates for religious freedom, documented alleged government harassment of Hindus.

MP Ashok Kumar tabled an Early Day Motion in the House of Commons stating, "This House, prior to the visit of the President of Kazakhstan, condemns the harassment of and discrimination against Hindu minorities in Kazakhstan; notes that Hindus in the Karasai district have had land, barns and cows confiscated, have been threatened with demolition of their houses, and denied the right to own land. It further notes that Kazakh Hindus who applied for ownership of their houses were asked to declare that they were not Hindus, while non-Hindus who made similar applications were immediately granted ownership rights; acknowledges that the Supreme Court reviewed two cases regarding Hindu cottages and ruled against Hindus without inviting the plaintiffs to the hearings."

== Sacha Baron Cohen and Borat ==
On Borat, Idrissov complained that Sacha Baron Cohen's portrayal of Kazakhstan is far from the reality of the "increasingly modern, prosperous, secular state" that is Kazakhstan. A spokesman for the British Foreign Office denied that relations between Kazakhstan and the UK were poor. President Nazarbayev laughed at Cohen's movie Borat: Cultural Learnings of America for Make Benefit Glorious Nation of Kazakhstan, saying, "This film was created by a comedian so let's laugh at it – that's my attitude."

== Resident diplomatic missions ==
- Kazakhstan has an embassy in London.
- United Kingdom has an embassy in Astana.
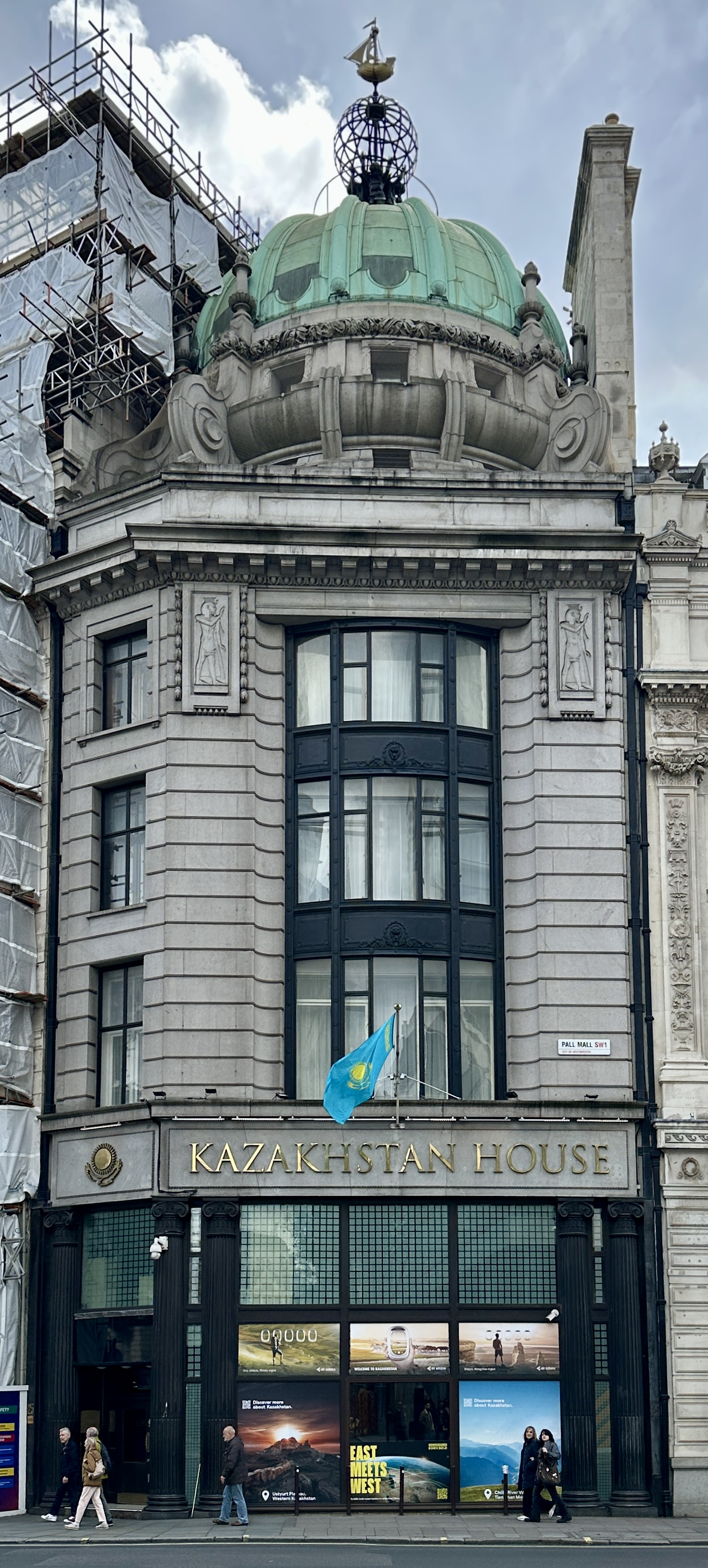
Embassy of Kazakhstan in London

== See also ==
- Foreign relations of Kazakhstan
- Foreign relations of the United Kingdom
- Counter-terrorism in Kazakhstan
