= Dinmukhamet Akhimov =

Kazakh actor

- Дінмұхамед Әкімов
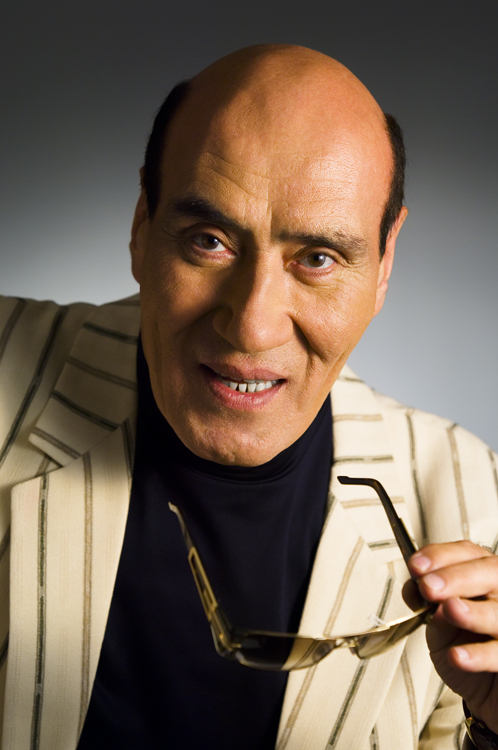
- Born: August 8, 1948 (age 77); Aktogay, Ayagoz District, Semipalatinsk Oblast, Kazakh SSR, Soviet Union
- Occupation: Actor
- Years active: 1968–present
- Children: 2

Dınmūhamed Tıleulesūly Äkımov (Note: Often transliterated as Dinmukhamet Tleulesovich Akhimov through a Russified Romanization of Динмухамет Тлеулесович Ахимов.) (Kazakh: Дінмұхамед Тілеулесұлы Әкімов; born August 8, 1948), known as "Dimash" ("Димаш"), is a Kazakh actor, Honoured Artist of the Kazakh SSR, holder of the Kurmet and Parasat orders, member of the Filmmakers Association of Kazakhstan.

== Career ==
Akhimov has been acting since 1968. He graduated from a two-year course at "Kazakhfilm" picture studio. In 1970 he entered in the All-Union State Film Institute of Order of the Red Banner of Labour (Moscow) to the course of the People's Artist of the Soviet Union Boris Babochkin and in 1974, he successfully graduated from this Institute. His thesis work was a leading role in the play of William Shakespeare's "Othello" and a role of the city-provost in the play of Nikolai Gogol "The Inspector General". In 1987, he entered the stage direction faculty of Almaty State Art and Theatre Institute named after T. Zhurgenov (nowadays Cinema Academy), which he graduated from in 1990.

During his 48-year career in acting he has appeared in over 100 films at 13 film studios of the post-Soviet space and outside: Czechoslovakia, Poland, Germany, Italy, Switzerland, France, Japan, India, Iran, and others. He currently resides in Almaty, Kazakhstan.

In 1990, his work in cinematography was awarded the "Honoured Artist of Kazakh SSR".

In 2008 Dinmukhamet Akhimov received the Order of Kurmet for the achievements in movies and TV industry.

In 2014, overcoming the language barrier, he played the role of a guide in the series "Marco Polo" produced by The Weinstein Company.

A year later, Akhimov played the role of crime boss Buzaubas in Nurtas Adambay's film Village Escape. Love Affair.

== Filmography ==
Films in which Dinmukhamet Akhimov has appeared include the following:

| Year | Film | Role | Country |
|---|---|---|---|
| 1968 | Kyz-Zhibek | Hero Syrlybaya | Soviet Union |
| 1968 | Traveling to Childhood | Servant | Soviet Union |
| 1969 | Angel in a Skull-cap | Episode | Soviet Union |
| 1970 | Siberian Grandfather | White guard | Soviet Union |
| 1975 | Basketballers | Dimash | Soviet Union |
| 1975 | Balapan | Smith | Soviet Union |
| 1976 | Bread and Salt | Tulep | Soviet Union |
| 1976 | Alpamys Goes to School | Instructor | Soviet Union |
| 1976 | Summer in the Zoo | Zoo Worker | Soviet Union |
| 1976 | Kusen Kuseke | Asker | Soviet Union |
| 1976 | "Wedding" Operation | Ordabai | Soviet Union |
| 1977 | Fiancee | Big Fellow | Soviet Union |
| 1977 | Originals | Lazybones | Soviet Union |
| 1977 | Anziya | Plowman | Soviet Union |
| 1977 | Once and for Life | Toke | Soviet Union |
| 1977 | Raushan | Dzhigit | Soviet Union |
| 1978 | Steppe Stories | Omar | Soviet Union |
| 1978 | On the Night of Lunar Eclipse | Kuser Bai | Soviet Union |
| 1978 | Flavor of bread | Driver Sechkin | Soviet Union |
| 1979 | City's Guard | Zhumabai | Soviet Union |
| 1979 | Trooper Under the Clouds | Abdrakhman | Soviet Union |
| 1979 | Process | Bozo | Soviet Union |
| 1979 | Blood and Sweat | Fisherman | Soviet Union |
| 1979 | Village Mosaic | Oral | Soviet Union |
| 1980 | Runners Are Hasten | Batyr | Soviet Union |
| 1980 | Golden Autumn | Beishenbai | Soviet Union |
| 1980 | Drift | Cowboy | Soviet Union |
| 1980 | Chinking Heat Season | Askerbek | Soviet Union |
| 1980 | We Are Adult | Dunbai | Soviet Union |
| 1981 | Last Passage | Seit | Soviet Union |
| 1981 | Farewell to Medeo | Big Clown | Soviet Union Czechoslovakia |
| 1981 | Dobrodei | Bolat | Soviet Union |
| 1981 | Melon | Conductor | Soviet Union |
| 1981 | Intolerable Children | Zhamal's Husband | Soviet Union |
| 1982 | Ambler's Talisman | Yerken | Soviet Union |
| 1982 | Red Yurt | Mergen-bai | Soviet Union |
| 1982 | Home Under the Moon | Yesen | Soviet Union |
| 1982 | Children's War Time | Fisherman | Soviet Union |
| 1982 | Snowstorm Night | Kaisar's Friend | Soviet Union |
| 1982 | Capricorn | Motan | Soviet Union |
| 1983 | Wash Away Your Guilt | Zhanas | Soviet Union |
| 1983 | Via Lactea | Chairman | Soviet Union |
| 1983 | Enemy, be afraid of the ninth son | Karazhal | Soviet Union |
| 1983 | Descendant of the White Panther | Merchant Mukhammed | Soviet Union |
| 1984 | Welcome Adam | Adam | Soviet Union |
| 1984 | Silver Snuffle | Zhunus | Soviet Union |
| 1984 | Human Factor | Edik | Soviet Union |
| 1985 | My Home on Green Hills | Gubaidulla | Soviet Union |
| 1986 | Deer-man | Akhan | Soviet Union |
| 1986 | Lame Dervish | Gadman | Soviet Union Hungary |
| 1986 | Honour Your Name | Economist | Soviet Union |
| 1986 | Weaker Woman | Passport Office Worker | Soviet Union |
| 1986 | Turksib | Railroad Man | Soviet Union |
| 1986 | Time for Life | Asker | Soviet Union |
| 1986 | Peter the Great | Mongol Fighter | United States |
| 1987 | Who are You, Rider? | Fyedya | Soviet Union |
| 1987 | Wormseed | Motorcyclist | Soviet Union |
| 1987 | Son-in-law From Province | Aidos | Soviet Union |
| 1987 | Shanyrak | Serik | Soviet Union |
| 1987 | Beautiful Aisulu | Karabai | Soviet Union |
| 1988 | Reception center for underaged | Vakhidov | Soviet Union |
| 1988 | Balcony | Episode | Soviet Union |
| 1988 | Kulan Calf | Batyr | Soviet Union |
| 1988 | Whirlwind | Man in Glasses | Soviet Union |
| 1988 | Chase | Eshmat | Soviet Union |
| 1988 | Baybars | Emir | Soviet Union |
| 1989 | Incomer | Karakhan | Soviet Union |
| 1989 | The Latvians?! | Saken | Soviet Union |
| 1989 | The Death of Kulan | Koktebet | Soviet Union |
| 1989 | East Corridor or Central Asian Racket | Vasya | Soviet Union |
| 1989 | The Fall of Otrar | Khumar-Khadzhei | Soviet Union |
| 1990 | The Leg | Afghan | Soviet Union |
| 1990 | The Lord of Darkness | Episode | Soviet Union |
| 1990 | Gangsters in the Ocean | Filipino Bremo | Soviet Union |
| 1990 | Kaisar | Batyr | Soviet Union |
| 1991 | Cannibal | Torgai Kemelbayev | Soviet Union |
| 1992 | Pharaoh Inventor | Emperor Mekhter | Kazakhstan Latvia |
| 1993 | Code of Silence | Adyl | Russia Uzbekistan |
| 1995 | Imom al-Bukhoriy | Az-Zukhli | Tajikistan Uzbekistan |
| 1995 | Abai | Maibasar | Kazakhstan France |
| 1996 | Shanghai | Dimash | Kazakhstan |
| 1999 | Ba-Bo-Bu | Policeman | Italy Uzbekistan; France |
| 1999 | Timur the Great | Bekkichik | Uzbekistan |
| 1999 | Magic Sponsor | Supervisor Asker | Kazakhstan |
| 2002 | Luna Papa | Gynecologist | Germany Japan; Tajikistan; Uzbekistan; Austria; Switzerland; France; Russia |
| 2005 | Saga of Old Bulgars | Shorale | Russia Kazakhstan |
| 2007 | Wind-man | Tea-man | Russia |
| 2007 | Makhambet | Makhambet's Tutor | Kazakhstan |
| 2007 | Hokkaido Police | Nakamuro-san | Russia Japan |
| 2008 | Road to Mangazeya | Bakhman | Russia |
| 2009 | The Inhabited Island | Behemoth | Russia |
| 2012 | Kniga legend: Tainstvenniy les | Czar | Kazakhstan |
| 2012 | Waiting for the Sea | Starik | Russia Germany; France; Belgium; Kazakhstan; Ukraine |
| 2012 | Myn Bala | Third aristocrat | Kazakhstan |
| 2013 | Hard to Be a God | Servant | Russia |
| 2013 | Lyubov traktorista | Akim | Kazakhstan |
| 2014 | Kempir | Singer | Kazakhstan |
| 2014 | Marco Polo (TV series) | Turban Guide | United States |
| 2015 | Zhol/Put Boksera | Bek | Kazakhstan |
| 2015 | Village Escape. Love Affair | Buzaubas | Kazakhstan |
| 2016 | The Kazakh Khanate | Esen-Buga | Kazakhstan |
