= Magzhan Ilyassov =

Kazakh politician and diplomat

Mağjan Ilyassov
- Мағжан Ильясов
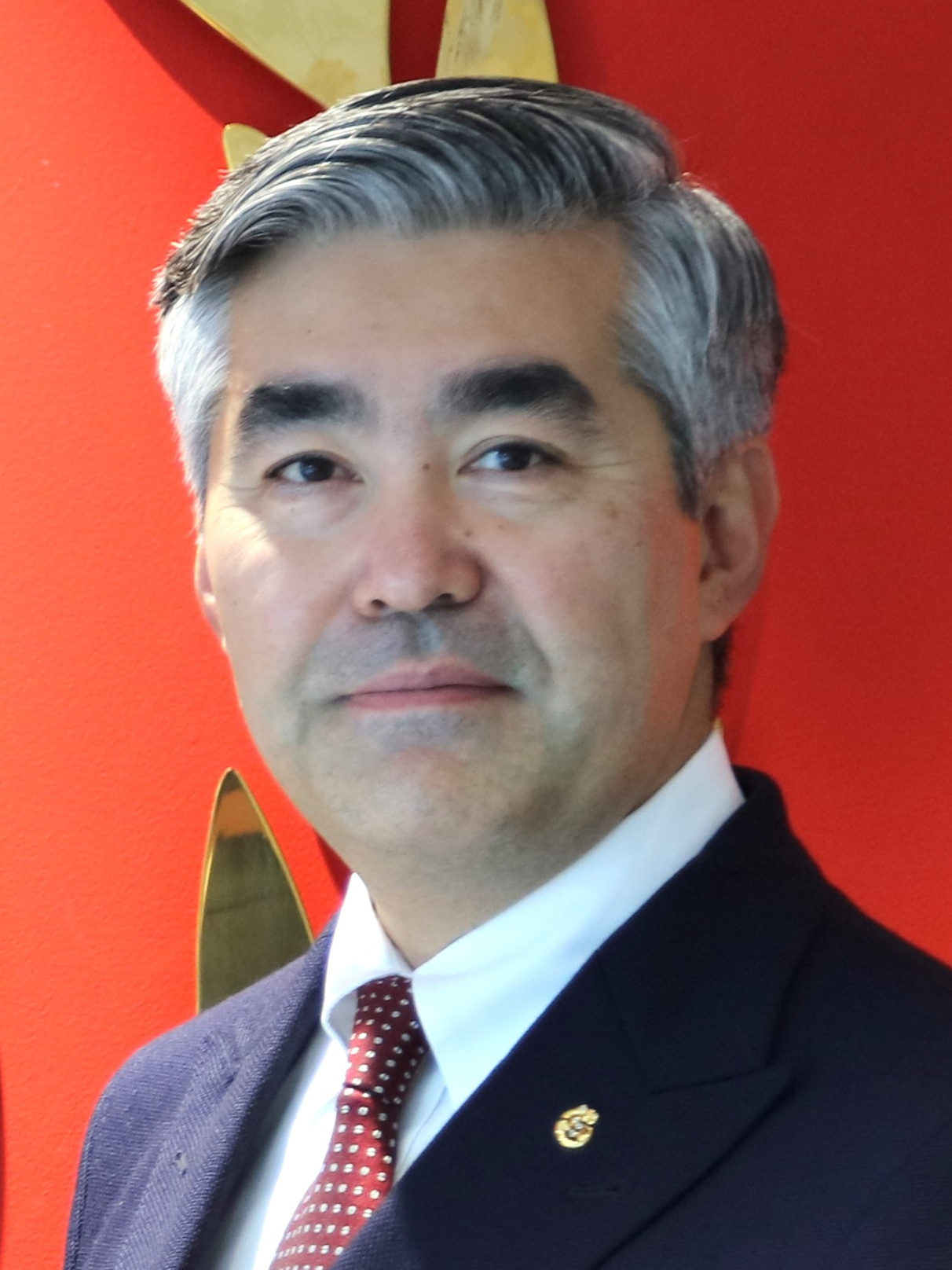
- Ilyassov in 2023

9th Ambassador of Kazakhstan to the United States
- Incumbent
- Assumed office 20 October 2025
- President: Kassym-Jomart Tokayev
- Preceded by: Yerzhan Ashikbayev

Ambassador of Kazakhstan to the United Kingdom, Iceland, and Ireland
- In office 6 October 2022 – 20 October 2025
- President: Kassym-Jomart Tokayev
- Preceded by: Erlan Idrissov
- Succeeded by: Älibek Baqaev

7th Permanent Representative of Kazakhstan to the United Nations
- In office 30 September 2020 – 6 October 2022
- President: Kassym-Jomart Tokayev
- Preceded by: Kairat Umarov
- Succeeded by: Akan Rakhmetullin

Ambassador of Kazakhstan to the Netherlands and the Organisation for the Prohibition of Chemical Weapons
- In office 12 May 2016 – 30 September 2020
- President: Nursultan Nazarbayev; Kassym-Jomart Tokayev
- Preceded by: Mainyura Myrzamadiyeva
- Succeeded by: Askar Zhumagaliyev

Advisor to the President of Kazakhstan
- In office 21 June 2013 – 11 May 2016
- President: Nursultan Nazarbayev

Personal details
- Born: 26 August 1974 (age 52) Alma-Ata, Alma-Ata Oblast, Kazakh SSR, Soviet Union
- Spouse: Aqmaral Aidarbekova
- Children: 1
- Education: Kazakh Ablai Khan University; Netherlands Institute of International Relations Clingendael; Harvard Kennedy School

Mağjan Janbotaūly Ilyassov (Note: Often transliterated as Magzhan Zhanbotayevich Ilyassov through a Russified Romanization of Магжан Жанботаевич Ильясов.) (Kazakh: Мағжан Жанботаұлы Ильясов; born 26 August 1974) is a Kazakh diplomat who serves as the Kazakh Ambassador to the United States since October 2025. Before this, from October 2022, he was the Ambassador of Kazakhstan to the United Kingdom, Iceland, and Ireland.

== Early life and education ==
Ilyassov was born on 26 August 1974 in Alma-Ata, Soviet Kazakhstan. In 1996, he finished his studies at the Kazakh Ablai Khan University of International Relations and World Languages.

In 1998, he graduated the Netherlands Institute of International Relations Clingendael in the Hague and received a master's degree in state administration of the Harvard Kennedy School.

== Career ==
Ilyassov began his diplomatic career in 1996 as a referent at the Department of International Organizations and International Economic Relations of the Ministry of Foreign Affairs of Kazakhstan, and later continued in the position of attaché in the Department of International Organizations and International Economic Relations until 1998.

He then served as Third Secretary and later Second Secretary in the United Nations and International Economic Organizations Department from 1998 to 1999. From 1999 to 2003, he worked as a consultant in the Protocol Service of the Presidential Administration of Kazakhstan.

Later, from 2003 to 2005, Ilyassov served as the chief expert of the Organizational and Documentation Support Group of the Office of the President of Kazakhstan. From 2005 to 2012, he worked at the Foreign Policy Center of the Presidential Administration, where he advanced from Chief Expert to Head of the Center.

In 2013, he was appointed both an advisor to the president of Kazakhstan and head of the Foreign Policy Center of the Presidential Administration. He served in the position until 2016.

From 2016 to 2020, Ilyassov served as the Kazakh ambassador to both the Netherlands and the Organisation for the Prohibition of Chemical Weapons. From there and until October 2022, he was the permanent representative of Kazakhstan to the United Nations. During his tenure, he submitted Kazakhstan's ratification of the Second Optional Protocol to abolish the death penalty and addressed the General Assembly on issues of nuclear disarmament.

In April 2023, he was also accredited concurrently as Ambassador to Iceland and Ireland. In September 2023, he spoke at the University of Oxford, at the invitation of the Oxford Centre for Islamic Studies.

On 6 October 2022, he was appointed the combined Kazakh ambassador to the United Kingdom, Iceland, and Ireland.

On 20 October 2025, President Kassym-Jomart Tokayev appointed him the ambassador of Kazakhstan to the United States. He replaced Yerzhan Ashikbayev in the position.

== Personal life ==
Ilyassov is married and has one son. He speaks Kazakh, Russian, English, and German.

== Awards and honors ==
Ilyassov is a recipient of the medals "10 years to the Independence of Kazakhstan" and "for Distinguished Labor".
