= Karl Baumgartner =

German film producer

- Born: 1949; Bruneck, Italy
- Died: 18 March 2014 (aged 64–65); Frankfurt, Germany
- Occupation: Film producer
- Years active: 1991–2014

Karl Baumgartner (1949 – 18 March 2014) was a German film producer. He worked on more than 70 films between 1991 and 2014.

== Selected filmography ==
- Life on a String (1991)
- Underground (1995)
- Dance of the Wind (1997)
- Black Cat, White Cat (1998)
- Luna Papa (1999)
- Mostly Martha (2001)
- The Suit (2003)
- Spring, Summer, Fall, Winter... and Spring (2003)
- Stratosphere Girl (2004)
- You Am I (2006)
- The World Is Big and Salvation Lurks Around the Corner (2008)
- Teza (2008)
- The Light Thief (2010)
- Waiting for the Sea (2012)
- Clouds of Sils Maria (2014)
