= Nurtas Adambay =

Kazakh actor and filmmaker (born 1981)

- Нұртас Адамбай
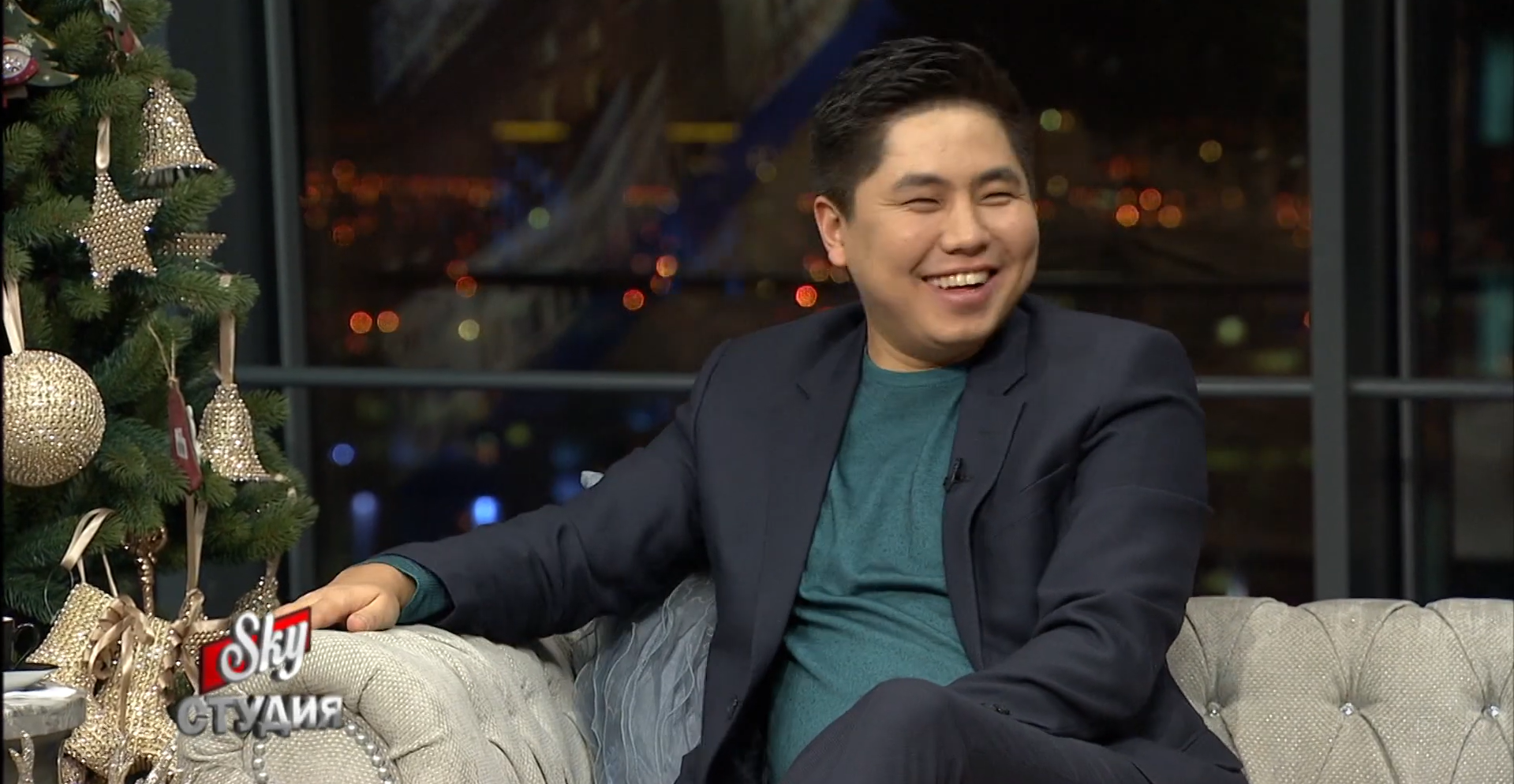
- Adambay in 2015
- Born: Nurtas Abayevich Adambayev; 14 December 1981 (age 44); Dzhambul, Dzhambul Region, Kazakh SSR, Soviet Union
- Education: Kazakh Ablai Khan University
- Years active: 2003–2019; 2021–present
- Notable work: Bride Sabina; Village Escape. Love Affair; Akim
- Spouse(s): Galiya (m. 2011, divorced) (m. 2015)

Nurtas Adambay (Note: Kazakh: Нұртас Адамбай, sometimes transliterated as Adambai) (born Nurtas Abayevich Adambayev; (Note: Russian: Нуртас Абаевич Адамбаев, Kazakh: Нұртас Абайұлы Адамбаев, Nūrtas Abaiūly Adambaev, [no̙rˈtɑs ɑˈbɑjʊɫɤ ɑdɑmˈbɑjɪf]) 14 December 1981) is a Kazakh actor, comedian, and filmmaker. Known previously for his work as a KVN comedian and later for his acting and directing of various comedic projects, most notably Bride Sabina, he is the creator of the Nurtas Production studio.

== Life and career ==
Nurtas Adambay was born Nurtas Abayevich Adambayev on 14 December 1981 in Dzhambul. Adambayev used to earn money breakdancing as a child. During these years, he would also visit his grandmother in the village Saudakent, Jambyl Region. As a result of the 1986 Jeltoqsan protests and its aftermath, Adambayev's father Abay Adambayev resigned from law enforcement. Adambay's grandfather Baltabay Adambayev was a notable Kazakh historian and poet.

Adambay studied in the Kazakh Ablai Khan University and finished its political science degree with honors. During his studies, he became a member of the "Astana.kz" KVN team. The first notable work by Adambay was Nasha Kazasha (2008–2013), which was a Kazakh adaptation of Nasha Russia. There, he played various comedic roles and established himself as an actor.

After the success of Nasha Kazasha, Adambay created the Nurtas Production studio, which worked on commercials, comedy shows, TV series, and feature films. The initial successful projects of the studio included Village Escape (2011–2013) and its sequels, as well as KZlandia.

Bride Sabina (2014) was an exceptionally experimental project of Adambay, as he was the director, screenwriter, producer of the film, as well as the travesti actor of its eponymous main character, Bride Sabina. The International Film Festival for Documentary Short and Comedy Films, the Genre Celebration Film Festival, and the L’Officiel Awards, as well as the Kazakhstan Critics' Choice Awards rewarded Bride Sabina with its highest awards. Bride Sabina later went on to have sequels of its own, including Bride Sabina 2 (2016) and Bride Sabina 3 (2020). Another notable travesti role of Adambay was his role as the main character of Matchmakers (2018). After the Bride Sabina trilogy ended, Adambay refused to play any more female characters.

Outside of comedic films, Adambay's works also included dramas, most notably Taraz (2016) and Elevator (2018).

In the 2020s, Adambay created the Nuradam YouTube podcast, where he would discuss the Quran with other Muslim personalities.

In August 2026, it was revealed that Adambay and his family have been living in the United States. Described by him as initially a temporary stay, he claims to now live there permanently. His prior opposition to LGBTQ representation did not stop his from living in Los Angeles, California, where he "saw no LGBTQ propaganda". He has since been producing AI-generated films.

In November 2026, Adambay's wife, Galiya Adambay, said in a series of Instagram stories that he had fallen under the influence of influencer Torebek Bekbayev, whose followers she described as a "sect". She said their views on child-rearing, including opposition to making children do things against their will, had caused conflict in the family.

== Controversies ==
In 2022, Adambay supported the ban of the Lightyear (2022) premiere in Kazakhstan because of a present one-second homosexual kiss. The movie's release in the country was later banned, as announced by the Minister of Culture and Sports Dauren Abaev. According to Adambay himself, the petition for the ban gained over 30 thousand votes. He added that seeing homosexual partners kiss would have "broken the psyche" of underage viewers.

Adambay has also voiced his opposition to association football. He claimed that it harms both the player and the viewer, as the shorts worn by the players do not follow proper Islamic clothing laws. He has also shown himself to be against any combat sport.

In 2023, he opposed the touring of Russian musician Andrey Makarevich in Kazakhstan because of his support of Israel in the Gaza war. In September of the same year, he also harshly critisied politician Rinat Zaitov for claiming that "80% of all fraud" is done by "those who perform salah", demanding either the latter's proof of the claim or resignation from the Mäjilis.

=== Legal disputes ===
On 1 August 2024, Adambay announced that the Astana Directorate of Religious Affairs has filed a lawsuit against him because he "quoted translations of the Holy Quran" on his social media. He was accused of violating the law on the Distribution of Religious literature and other materials of Religious content (Article 490 of the Code of Administrative Offenses) and it was noted that he could be fined $393 because of this. The exact reasoning for the lawsuit was Adambay's sharing of religious texts without being a certified representative of any religious organization, which was indeed a punishable offence. However the lawsuit was later moved indefinitely. Dimaş Äljanov, among others, however, did not believe Adambay would face any major repercussions. Adambay announced in a September 2026 interview that he simply paid the fine.

== Personal life ==
Adambay first got married in 2011, to Galiya, a graphic designer from Almaty. In December 2012, their first child and son Alisher was born. However, the family was said to have had marital problems and after living separately for some time, they got divorced.

In 2015, Adambay and Galiya remarried. In 2021, Adambay went through depression because of family issues, but seemed to have recovered by becoming a lot more religious and thus reunited with his family. In 2022, a daughter of his was born.

== Political views ==
Political scientist Dimaş Äljanov described Adambay as a person "loyal to the regime".

Following the release of Akim (2019), where Adambay played a rich young man becoming an akim, there were rumors that this could be a beginning to Adambay's potential political career, as parallels to Volodymyr Zelenskyy were made. However Adambay stated that this was not an oppositionist movie, but rather a romantical comedy, also expressing "no interest" in following Zelenskyy's path.

After personal issues faced during the COVID-19 pandemic, Adambay's political views and personal life shifted closer to conservative Islam. In 2023, when justifying his push to ban Lightyear (2022) in Kazakhstan, Adambay pushed a conspiracy theory that "someone" was trying to influence the Kazakh society to reduce the fertility rates and "traditional values" of the country. He did not specify on who this "someone" is, only making a reference to "the West". After becoming a practicing Muslim, Adambay stated that Kazakhstan would be better off with sharia law, stating that it'd have solved all corruption and domestic abuse issues, additionally criticising journalist Erjan Esimhanov for expressing his atheism. Adambay also commented on his refusal to address any political events in the country, including the 2022 Bloody January, by stating that it is not something that in his area of work.

In July 2024, Adambay formally apologized on Instagram to presidents Kassym-Jomart Tokayev, Nursultan Nazarbayev, Vladimir Putin and Alexander Lukashenko, mäjilisman Rinat Zaitov, and musician Andrey Makarevich, for his "out of stupidity" previous criticism of them. Also formally apologizing to "everyone, with whom he may have had conflicted", Adambay praised the heads of state for "their service for the good of [their countries]", additionally praising Vladimir Putin for "preserving family values, opposing the promotion of obscenity".

Since moving to the United States, Adambay has praised the country, saying "God Bless America", mentioning that he feels freer there as a Muslim than, "for example, in the UAE". Despite his continuous support for censorship and the Kazakh anti-LGBTQ law, he described transgender people as "just being on their own journey", which is "none of [his] business".

== Legacy ==
In 2012, Forbes featured Adambay in the top 3 list of the most successful and wealthy Kazakh show business celebrities. In 2015, he was awarded the "People's Favorite" award.

== Filmography ==
Year	Title	Original title (Note: The original language of the titles being Russian by default, unless stated otherwise)	Role	Type	Notes	Ref(s)
2008–2012	Nasha Kazasha	Наша Казаша	several roles	comedic TV series		
2009	The Interesting Radio	Қызық радиосы (Note: Kazakh title)		comedic TV series		
2009	Qairat is the champion and a virgin number one	Кайрат — чемпион, или Девственник номер один	Serik	comedic film		
2009	Open the door, I am Happiness!	Откройте дверь — я счастье!	Baqyt	comedic series		
2010	Cocktail for a star	Коктейль для звезды	Clipmaker	comedy		
2010	Snatch	Рывок	Commentator	film		
2011	Village Escape	Побег из аула	Erbol Äpşuberov (Apshuberov)	comedic series		
2012	Village Escape 2	Побег из аула-2	Erbol Äpşuberov (Apshuberov)	comedic series		
2012	Kzlandia. Reboot	KZландия. Перезагрузка	several roles	comedic TV series		
2013	Village Escape 3	Побег из аула-3	Erbol Äpşuberov (Apshuberov)	comedic series		
2014	Teachers	Преподы	Marat	comedic series		
2014	Bride Sabina	Келинка Сабина	Bride Sabina	comedic film	also director	
2015	Bride Sabina 2	Келинка Сабина-2	Bride Sabina	comedic film	also director	
2015	A Wedding for three	Свадьба на троих	Timur	comedic film		
2015	Village Escape. Love Affair	Побег из аула: Операция Махаббат (Note: Махаббат (Mahabbat) here being a Kazakh word)	Erbol Äpşuberov (Apshuberov)	comedic film	also director	
2016	Taraz	Тараз	Aidar	drama film	also director	
2017	A Kazakh girl	Қазақ аруы	cameo appearance	comedic mini-series		
2017	Elevator	Лифт	—	psychological drama film	only director	
2018	I am the groom	Я — жених	Timur	comedic film	also director	
2018	Matchmakers	Құдалар	Jannette Nurlybaeva	comedic film	also director	
2019	Akim	Аким	Azamat	comedic film	also director	
2022	Bride Sabina 3	Келинка Сабина-3	Bride Sabina	comedic film	also director	
