= Ha Yeo-jin =

South Korean actress

Yeo-jin Ha (born February 4, 1986) is a South Korean actress, known for Spring, Summer, Fall, Winter... and Spring (2003) and Something About 1% (2003).

== Filmography ==
Title	Year	Role	Notes	Ref.
Spring, Summer, Fall, Winter... and Spring	2003	The Girl		
Something About 1%	2003			
