= Bakhtyar Khudojnazarov =

Film director, producer and screenwriter (1965–2015)

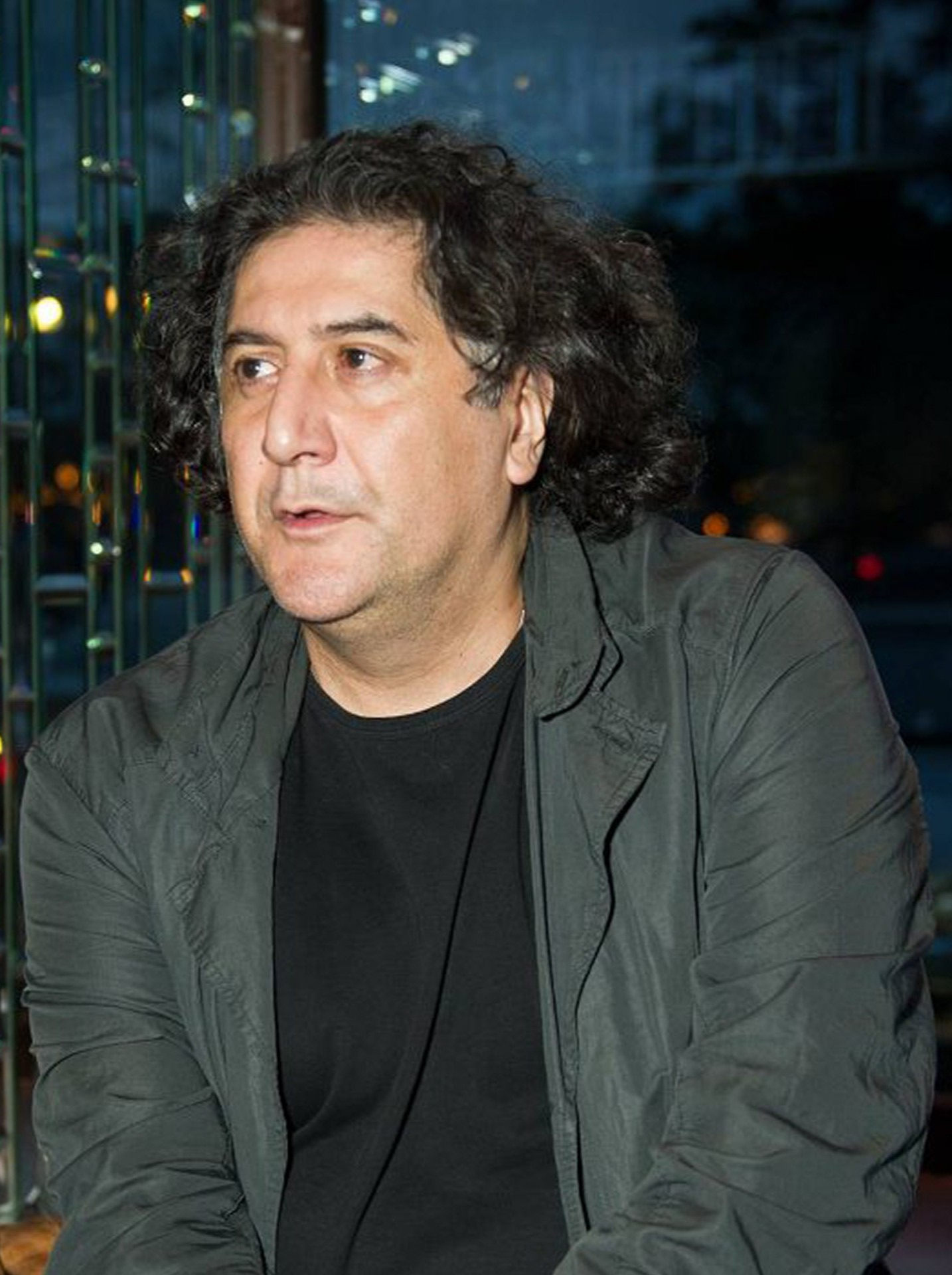
- Khudojnazarov in 2015
- Born: May 29, 1965
- Died: April 21, 2015 (aged 49)

Bakhtyar Khudojnazarov (Russian/Tajik: Бахтиёр Худойназаров, Persian: بختیار خدای‌نظرف) (May 29, 1965 – April 21, 2015) was a film director, producer and screenwriter from Tajikistan, a graduate of the Gerasimov Institute of Cinematography. His most internationally famous film is the comedy Luna Papa (1999). He won a Silver Lion at the Venice Film Festival for his film Kosh ba kosh (1993). In 2000 he was a member of the jury at the 22nd Moscow International Film Festival.

Khudojnazarov lived in Berlin, Germany, from 1993 and died from a short illness aged 49.

== Filmography ==
- Brother (Братан, 1991)
- Kosh ba kosh (Кош-ба-кош, 1993)
- Luna Papa (Лунный папа, 1999)
- The Suit (Шик, 2003)
- Tanker Tango (Танкер Танго, 2006)
- Waiting for the Sea (В ожидании моря, 2012)
- Hetaera of Major Sokolov (Гетеры майора Соколова, 2014) (TV mini series)
