= Tauchik =

Tauchik Таушық تاۋشىق
- Town
- Location in Kazakhstan
- Coordinates: 44°20′48″N 51°20′58″E
- Country: Kazakhstan
- Region: Mangystau
- Elevation: 93 m (305 ft)

Population
  - Total: 2,600
- Time zone: UTC+05:00 (Kazakhstan Time)

Tauchik (Kazakh: Таушық, Tauşyq, تاۋشىق) is a town in Mangystau Region, southwest Kazakhstan, with a population of 2,600. It lies at an altitude of 93 m (305 ft).
