= Bride Sabina =

2014 Kazakh comedy film

- Directed by: Nurtas Adambay
- Written by: Nurtas Adambay
- Produced by: Nurtas Adambay
- Starring: Nurtas Adambay; Ainūr Iliasova; Erlan Qasymjanūly; Esjan Hamidullin
- Cinematography: Azamat Dulatov
- Music by: Nikita Karev
- Production company: Nurtas Production
- Release date: 27 November 2014 (Kazakhstan)
- Running time: 103 minutes
- Country: Kazakhstan
- Languages: Russian and Kazakh
- Budget: $300,000
- Box office: $614,000

Bride Sabina (Russian: Келинка Сабина, Kelinka Sabina,Kazakh: Сабина Келін, Sabina Kelin) is a 2014 Kazakh comedy film directed and written by Nurtas Adambay. It stars Nurtas Adambay, who plays the eponymous main character, in travesti. The film follows Almaty native Sabina Qarsybaeva, who's kidnapped and forcibly wed to charlatan Janibek, and is therefore forced to get used to rural life.

An experimental movie, which was written, produced and led by comedian and actor Nurtas Adambay, it was exceptionally successful among Kazakh audiences. The success of the movie earned it two sequels: Bride Sabina 2 and Bride Sabina 3.

== Production ==
The production of the movie cost only $300,000 and the filming only required 17 days.

The film was released on 27 November 2014.

== Plot ==
A sequel to Kzlandia, Bride Sabina follows urban Sabina, daughter to a wealthy family, getting used to rural life. A native of Almaty, she is tricked by "Sheikh Johnny" and promised a life in Jumeirah Beach. She is, however, instead kidnapped to Jügerı, a fictional remote village, and Johnny reveals himself to be Jänıbek. Sabina is then forced to marry him, learns to live by Kazakh customs, learns the Kazakh language, and is taught to cook beshbarmak.

== Cast ==
- Nurtas Adambay as Sabina Qarsybaeva
- Ainur Ilyasova as Altynşaş
- Erlan Qasymjanūly as Grandpa
- Esjan Hamidullin as Janibek/Johnny
- Jan Izbasar as Mukha (Altynşaş's husband)
- Älişer Örikbaev as tractor driver Nurgali
- Toqjan Tahanova as Grandma

== Reception ==
Bride Sabina was listed among Adambay's most recognized works and has earned several international awards. In just the first 5 days after its release, the movie received 112 million tenge.

Though sometimes criticised for its unflattering depiction of rural Kazakhs, the film is considered a success and has later earned two sequels.
