= Kazakh Ablai Khan University of International Relations and World Languages =

University in Kazakhstan

Coordinates: 43°14′37.5″N 76°55′13.9″E

- Абылай хан атындағы Қазақ Халықаралық Қатынастар және Әлем Тілдері Университеті; Abylai han atyndağy Qazaq Qatynastar jäne Älem Tılderı Universitetı
- Former names: Almaty Pedagogical Institute of Foreign Languages
- Motto in English: Transparency, integration, internationalization
- Type: Joint-Stock Company
- Established: 1941
- Rector: Kunanbaeva Salima Sagikyzy
- Academic staff: 500
- Students: 5000
- Location: (Kazakhstan) 200 Muratbaev st., 050022 Almaty, Kazakhstan
- Campus: Urban
- Website: ablaikhan.kz

University rankings

Regional – Overall
- QS Emerging Europe and Central Asia: 221-230 (2022)

The Kazakh Ablai Khan University of International Relations and World Languages (KAUIR&WL, Kazakh Ablai Khan University) is a university in Almaty, Kazakhstan, that has provided foreign language education for 75 years. It used to be known as the Almaty Pedogogical Teacher's Institute of Foreign Languages.

== History ==
The history of establishment and development of Kazakh Ablai khan University of International Relations and World Languages is closely related to the development of foreign language teaching in the country. Established in the Soviet period in 1941, after gaining the status of university it began a new page in its history. Training began with 231 students (113 in Faculty of English, 97 in German language, 21 in French language).

There are all conditions for training highly qualified specialists in various branches of humanitarian foreign language and international profile.

== Rectors ==
- 1941 Melikov Hanaahmed Karaevich
- 1941 — 1942 Balakaev Maulen Balakayuly
- 1942 — 1943 Suleymenov Bekezhan Suleymenovich
- 1943 — 1947 Fisenko Varvara Fedorovna
- 1947 — 1951 Kuznecov Alexey Ivanovich
- 1951 — 1956 Pahmurnyj Pavel Mihajlovich
- 1956 — 1962 Iskakov Tulesh Iskakovich
- 1962 — 1967 Ibraeva Ajar Khakimovna
- 1967 — 1976 Zhandildinov Nurymbet Zhandildinovich
- 1977 — 1978 Akhanov Kakhan Akhanovich
- 1979 — 1987 Amirov Rakysh Satovich
- 1987 — 1992 Irmuhanov Beimbet Babikteevich
- 1992 — 1999 Ahmetov Adil Kurmanzhanuly
- 1999 — Kunanbaeva Salima Sagikyzy

== Faculties and Education Programmes ==
- Pedagogical Faculty of Foreign Languages
  - Foreign Language: two foreign languages (Pedagogic)
  - Pedagogy and psychology
- Faculty of Translation and Philology
  - Translation studies (Simultaneous Interpreter; Translator Referent)
  - Foreign Philology (English, French, German)
- Faculty of International Relations
  - International Relations
  - Regional (Area) Studies
- Faculty of Management and International Communications
  - International Tourism Management
  - Journalism
  - Hotel and Restaurant Management
  - Cultural and Communicative Service
  - Public Relations
- Faculty of Asian Studies
  - Asian Studies
  - Translation Studies (Simultaneous Interpreter; Translator Referent)
  - Foreign Philology (Chinese, Korean, Arabic, Japanese)
- Faculty of Economics and Law
  - Economics
  - Management and Marketing
  - State and Local Government
  - Jurisprudence
  - International Law

== International recognition ==
- "Austrian Honorary Cross" for contribution to the development of education and culture
- International award "European Quality"
- International award "United Europe" for contribution to European integration
- International honorary award "Socrates" for contribution to the intellectual development of the younger generation
- The honorary title of "Leader of education", was set Cambridge Scientific Association
- International award "Order of Lomonosov" for contribution to science (Russia)
- International Honorary Award "Academic Palm branch" (France)
- Kazakh Ablai Khan University of International Relations and World languages has recently received the International Quality Certificate of the Swiss Institute of Quality Standards “SIQS”
- National Certificate and medal "Industry Leader" in the socio-economic sector
- International award in the field of scientific researches "The name in science"
