= Working Group on Parliamentary Reform =

Political body in Kazakhstan

The Working Group on Parliamentary Reform (Kazakh: Парламенттік реформа жөніндегі жұмыс тобы; Russian: Рабочая группа по парламентской реформе) was a special body led by Erlan Qarin, composed of representatives from the Mäjilis, Senate, Assembly of People of Kazakhstan, political party factions, legal scholars, research institute directors, constitutional law experts, and members of the National Kurultai. It was established by President Kassym-Jomart Tokayev on 8 October 2025 to prepare proposals for the transition to a unicameral parliament. Over six meetings spanning six months, political parties and public organizations submitted proposals regarding the composition, term, electoral procedures, powers, and institutional interactions of the future unicameral parliament. The working group concluded its activities on 21 January 2026, with its work on constitutional reform continuing under the newly established Constitutional Commission.

== History ==
=== Background and formation ===
On 8 September 2025, at his State of the Nation Address, President Kassym-Jomart Tokayev announced a proposal to transition Kazakhstan to a unicameral parliament, emphasizing that reform proposals should be thoroughly discussed before any changes were submitted for a referendum.

On 8 October 2025, Tokayev issued Resolution No. 250 establishing the Working Group on Parliamentary Reform, composed of representatives of the Mäjilis and Senate, the Assembly of People of Kazakhstan, parliamentary party faction leaders, legal scholars, constitutional experts, research institute heads, and members of the National Kurultai, to prepare proposals for transitioning Kazakhstan to a unicameral parliament, composed of:

1. Erlan Qarin – State Counsellor of Kazakhstan, head of the working group
2. Erjan Jienbaev – assistant to the president on legal issues, deputy head of the working group
3. Arman Qyryqbaev – assistant to the president on internal policy and communications, deputy head of the working group
4. Qabdolsamih Aitqojin – Doctor of Law, professor at the Eurasian Law Academy
5. Marat Äzilhanov – executive of Assembly of People of Kazakhstan
6. Indira Äubäkirova – Doctor of Law, director of Institute of Legislation and Legal Information
7. Marat Bäşimov – deputy of the Mäjilis, Doctor of Law
8. Elnur Beisembaev – head of Amanat faction in the Mäjilis
9. Nurlan Beknazarov – chairman, Committee on Constitutional Legislation, Senate
10. Serik Egizbaev – head of Auyl faction in the Mäjilis
11. Qarlyğaş Jamanqulova – president, International Foundation for Protection of Freedom of Expression "Fair Word"
12. Leila Jaqaeva – Doctor of Law, professor at Academy of Judicial Justice
13. Aidar Jarylğanov – head of Department of State Law under Presidential Administration
14. Snejanna Imaşeva – chairwoman of the Mäjilis Committee on Legislation and Judicial-Legal Reform
15. Alipaşa Qaraev – Candidate of Legal Sciences, professor at Adilet Law Academy
16. Aidarbek Qojanazarov – head of Respublica faction in the Mäjilis
17. Qanat Qulşymanov – head of Department of Communications, Presidential Administration
18. Magerram Magerramov – head of People's Party of Kazakhstan faction in the Mäjilis
19. Viktor Malinovsky – Doctor of Law, professor, Narxoz University
20. Abzal Nükenov – head of Department of Internal Policy under Presidential Administration
21. Börihan Nurmuhamedov – political scientist
22. Natalia Pan – director of the Institute of Parliamentarism
23. Azat Peruaşev – head of Aq Jol faction in the Mäjilis
24. Sergey Ponomarev – deputy of the Mäjilis
25. Ashat Raqymjanov – head of Nationwide Social Democratic Party faction in the Mäjilis
26. Erlan Särsembaev – Minister of Justice
27. Aidos Sarym – deputy of the Mäjilis
28. Andrey Chebotarev – member of the National Kurultai; director of Center for Topical Research "Alternative"
29. Jandos Şaymardanov – director of the Strategic Research Institute under Presidential Administration
30. Ünzila Şapaq – deputy of the Mäjilis, Doctor of Law
31. Nikita Shatalov – deputy of the Mäjilis
32. Marat Şibutov – member of the National Kurultai; political scientist
33. Alua Ybyraeva – Doctor of Law, professor at Al-Farabi Kazakh National University

=== Meetings ===
On 14 October 2025, the Working Group on Parliamentary Reform held its inaugural meeting, where President Kassym-Jomart Tokayev emphasized the historic importance of transitioning Kazakhstan to a unicameral parliament. He noted that the reform would require amendments to approximately 40 articles of the Constitution, at least 10 constitutional laws, and over 50 codes and laws. Tokayev stressed a careful, evolutionary approach that incorporates public input through e-Gov and e-Otinish platforms, consultations with political parties, experts, and civil society, and alignment with the "Strong President – Influential Parliament – Accountable Government" framework. The reform aims to professionalize the parliament, strengthen multi-party dialogue through party-list proportional representation, and modernize legislative processes with tools such as e-Parliament, while cautioning against hasty decisions and emphasizing thorough analysis of all proposals and legal implications.

On 3 December 2025, the Working Group held its second meeting under the chairmanship of State Counsellor Erlan Qarin. Participants discussed the formation of the future unicameral Parliament, including deputy qualifications, election procedures, composition, quotas, and term lengths. Proposals submitted by working group members, six political parties, and citizens via e-Otinish and e-Gov platforms were reviewed. Natalia Pan, Director of the Institute of Parliamentarism, summarized the public and expert suggestions, while assistant to the president for legal affairs Erjan Jienbaev outlined general approaches developed from these submissions. The meeting concluded with a decision to systematize and analyze all proposals to guide future recommendations.

The third meeting, held on 29 December 2025, focused on reviewing and summarizing proposals, analyzing interim results, and outlining the main directions of legislative activity for the future Parliament. Pan presented over 400 submissions from citizens, experts, and public organizations, while Jienbaev discussed approaches to improving legislative efficiency and quality. Qarin highlighted that the reform, consistent with the "Strong President – Influential Parliament – Accountable Government" framework, is designed to enhance the legislative process. He instructed that all proposals be carefully collected and analyzed for incorporation into future recommendations.

On 9 January 2026, the fourth meeting addressed more than 500 proposals received via e-Otinish and e-Gov from citizens, experts, and public organizations. Members discussed the interaction of the future parliament with other state institutions and considered its official name. Qarin noted that the reform is part of ongoing political modernization, building on initiatives from 2019 to 2021 and the 2022 constitutional reforms. Participants expressed confidence that the planned amendments would improve legislative efficiency and strengthen cooperation among key state bodies, with additional proposals to be reviewed in subsequent meetings.

The fifth meeting, held on 15 January 2026, focused on the parliament's role in forming state bodies and refining constitutional procedures. Pan summarized roughly 600 proposals from citizens, experts, political parties, and public organizations, while Jienbaev outlined approaches regarding the parliament's involvement in the Government, the Constitutional Court, the Supreme Audit Chamber, the Central Election Commission, and other institutions. Members contributed further ideas, and Karin instructed that all submissions be analyzed to develop final approaches to parliamentary and constitutional reform.

The sixth and final meeting of the Working Group on Parliamentary Reform took place on 19 January 2026, chaired by Qarin and attended by Tokayev. The session reviewed the group's six months of work and examined more than 1,600 proposals submitted by citizens, political parties, experts, and public associations through the e-Otinish and e-Gov platforms. Jienbaev outlined key approaches on the composition, terms, electoral procedures, lawmaking process, and the interaction of the future unicameral parliament with other state institutions. Deputies, party leaders, and scholars noted the strong public interest shown during regional discussions. The working group concluded that these proposals, alongside prior constitutional amendments, would allow for a thorough modernization of the legislative branch, professionalize parliamentary work, and lay the groundwork for a fundamentally new political framework. Tokayev stressed that, given the scope and content of these proposals, the reforms effectively represent the adoption of new constitution for Kazakhstan.

=== Conclusion and aftermath ===
At the fifth meeting of the National Kurultai on 20 January 2026, Tokayev reported that the Working Group on Parliamentary Reform had received over 1,500 proposals on parliamentary and constitutional reforms, and announced that a constitutional commission would be established to review these proposals—including matters of regional representation and ethno-cultural inclusion—ensuring all changes are coherent and serve the interests of the Kazakh state. The following day, on 21 January 2026, Tokayev signed a decree creating the Commission on Constitutional Reform to examine the working group's proposals and other submissions and to prepare the new draft constitution.
