= Kazakhstan Institute for Strategic Studies =

Kazakh governmental organization

Kazakhstan Institute for Strategic Studies under the President of Kazakhstan
- Abbreviation: KazISS
- Formation: June 16, 1993
- Type: Governmental organization
- Official language: Kazakh, Russian
- Director: Yerkin Tukumov
- Website: kisi.kz

The Kazakhstan Institute for Strategic Studies Under the President of the Republic of Kazakhstan (KazISS) (Kazakh: Қазақстан Республикасы Президентінің жанындағы Қазақстан стратегиялық зерттеулер институты, romanized: Qazaqstan Respublikasy Prezidentınıñ janyndağy Qazaqstan strategiialyq zertteuler instituty; Russian: Казахстанский институт стратегических исследований при Президенте Республики Казахстан) is a Kazakhstan state institution aimed at providing research and analytical support to the president of Kazakhstan and his government. The KazISS provides research related to international and domestic affairs as well as the social and economic development of Kazakhstan. The KazISS aims to provide predictive research and analysis for the country's leadership.

== History ==
=== Establishment ===
KazISS' predecessor was the Center for Strategic Studies, established in 1992. The center was reorganized to become a full-fledged research institute by its first director Umirserik Kassenov, a career diplomat. The idea to found an institution of strategic studies was supported by Vice-President of Kazakhstan Yerik Asanbayev.

The Kazakhstan Institute for Strategic Studies was officially founded on 16 June 1993, under the Decree of President Nursultan Nazarbayev. Its mission was to provide predictive research and analysis of strategic issues of external and internal nature for further development of Kazakhstan.

In the first years of its functioning, the institute experienced a number of difficulties mostly due to the lack of material resources and qualified experts in international and domestic political affairs]. The KazISS started to employ the graduates of the Kazakh State University and the Kazakh State University of World Languages, orientalists and scholars from the Kazakhstan Academy of Sciences.

Initially, in terms of foreign policy analysis, the KazISS focused on the issues of national interest and security threats to Kazakhstan. Domestic issues, being increasingly pressing, gradually gained more attention of the KazISS experts. In the yearly 1990s, the KazISS offered its analysis on the background of comprehensive reforms of political, social and economic nature. The major task before the institute was to find the best ways that would enable the new nation to pursue its external and internal course.

At first, the KazISS mainly dealt with the issues of nuclear arsenal deployed in the territory of Kazakhstan and its participation in the START I. The experts soon expanded their research scope embracing geopolitics and international security. Soon Director Kassenov and other KazISS experts established contacts and cooperation with a number of prominent think tanks abroad. Umirserik Kassenov and his colleagues made considerable efforts to apply their potential and influence so that the nuclear issue would be solved positively for Kazakhstan. As the result, in 1994–1995 Kazakhstan received security guarantees from the world nuclear powers in exchange for the agreement to abandon the Soviet nuclear arsenal.

As the Institute gained experience and reputation in Kazakhstan, a number of prominent figures of world politics paid their visits, namely Zbigniew Brzezinski in 1993 and former United States Secretary of State James Baker in 1996.

Umirserik Kassenov succeeded in gathering a team of professionals with expertise in nuclear physics, economics, Sinology, Islamic studies and other fields. Ye. Arynov, M. Spanov, R. Zholamanov, K. Khafizova, D. Yeleukenov, K. Syroyezhkin, A. Sultangaliyeva and many others contributed greatly into the work of the institute under his leadership. Later K. Abuseitov and some other experts were employed by the Ministry of Foreign Affairs. In turn, a number of young career diplomats joined the KazISS experts’ pool bringing their practical experience that immediately affected quite positively the overall performance of the institute. Since then the two structures continue to cooperate.

Umirserik Kassenov largely contributed to the success the institute achieved in the first years of its functioning. However, due to the frictions with the Administration of President of Kazakhstan, the first director of the Kazakhstan Institute for Strategic Studies eventually resigned from his post in 1997.

=== Late 1990s ===
In the late 1990s the KazISS had rather difficult period; throughout the year there were three directors. Lev Tarakov managed to prevent complete dissolution of the KazISS and persuaded some experts to return. Director Tarakov laid the foundations of the current structure of the KazISS. More importantly, he introduced new research methods, strengthened the ties with the analytical staff within the Presidential Administration and launched the Kazakhstan-Spectrum journal.

Alma Sultangaliyeva succeeded Lev Tarakov as the director of the KazISS. Being an academician orientalist, a new director made the KazISS analysis receive more academic character, more attention was paid to the issues of Islam. The shift of the analytical focus proved well-timed as the Islamic factor in the world politics and particularly in Central Asia grew in importance. In 1998, Yermukhamet Yertysbayev headed the institute. Director Yertysbayev had both a political and academic background. He was able to establish an active dialogue with the opposition.

=== Current Developments ===
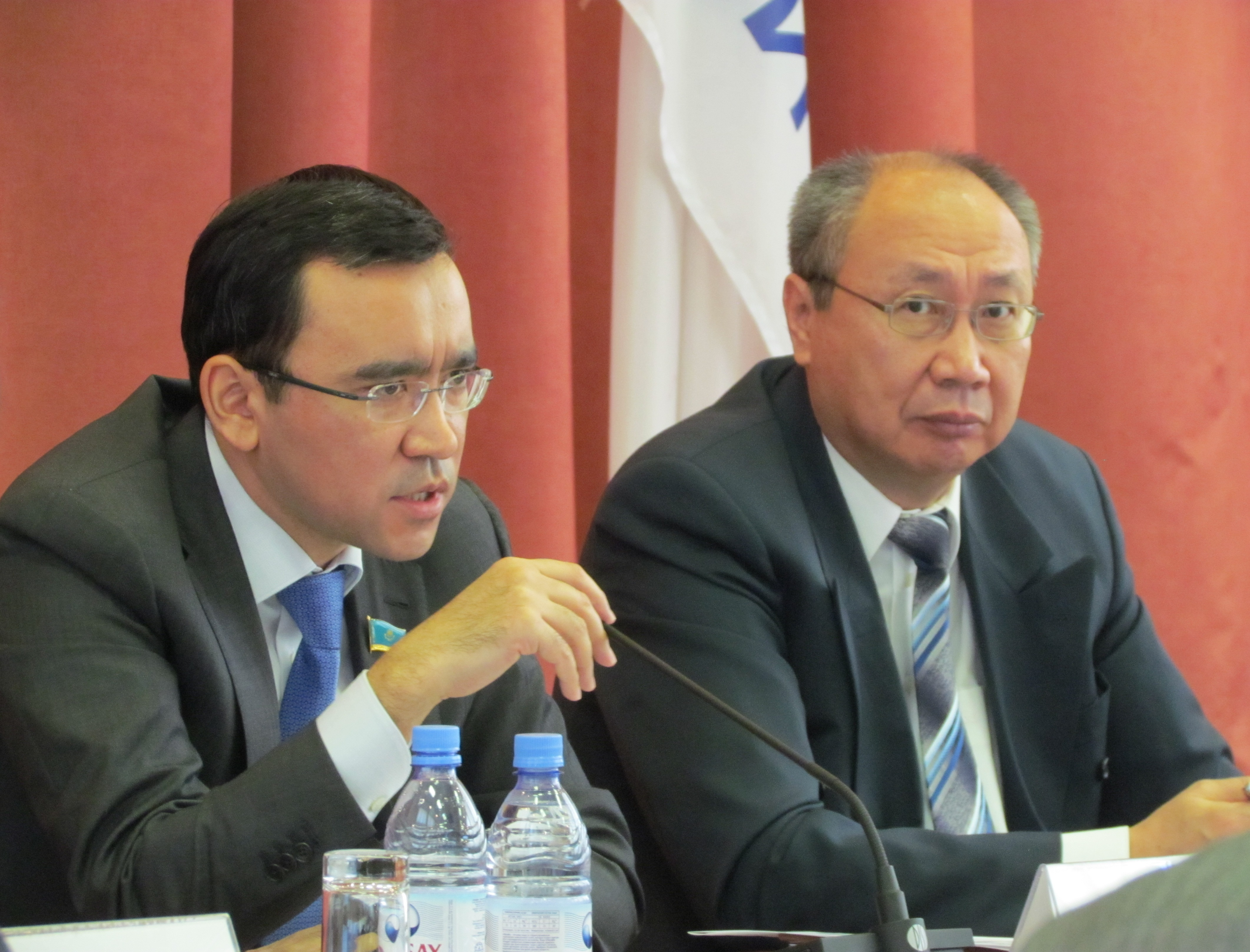
Maulen Ashimbayev and Bulat Sultanov, January 11, 2013.

In 2000, the new management was appointed at the KazISS led by a young academic Maulen Ashimbayev who previously had supervised analytical work for the Presidential Administration. The institute was then accountable to Marat Tazhin and the Center of Political Analysis under the president. In the context of aggravated international situation, growing security threats in Central Asia posing mainly by Afghanistan, 9/11 and subsequent US-led anti-terrorist operations as well as significant geopolitical changes, the KazISS enhanced its interaction with the Security Council and other security and analytical structures. The analysis conducted at the KazISS reflected these developments. Under Ashimbayev the Institute intensified its work in all directions: external and internal security, strategy for Kazakhstan in the new international environment, sustained economic development and Caspian issues. Maulen Ashimbayev established steady communication with the Presidential Administration; the analytical materials prepared by the institute were directly conveyed to the recipients therein. The number of publications increased dramatically; the Institute started to issue four journals; two in Russian, one in Kazakh and one in English. Director Ashimbayev made Kazakh a full-fledged working language at the KazISS. The number of analytical materials and publications in the Kazakh language redoubled.

In 2005 Bulat Sultanov was appointed the director of the KazISS, who converted his extensive diplomatic experience into a broader cooperation of the institute with foreign research and analytical institutions. The KazISS established partnership relations with the number of European, primarily German structures, namely the German Council on Foreign Relations (DGAP), the German Institute for International and Security Affairs (SWP), the Friedrich Ebert Foundation (FES), George C. Marshall European Center for Security Studies. The cooperation of the KazISS expanded and included Asian partners in China (Shanghai Institute for International Studies), India (Jawaharlal Nehru University) as well as Russia (the Russian Institute for Strategic Studies, the Institute of World Economy and International Relations, the Diplomatic Academy of the Ministry of Foreign Affairs of the Russian Federation).

On April 11, 2014 KazISS was relocated in Astana by the decree of the president of Kazakhstan Nursultan Nazarbayev.

On October 16, 2014 Erlan Karin has been appointed director of KazISS by the order of the president of Kazakhstan, Nursultan Nazarbayev. On the same day president signed a decree according to which institute will plan their activities on the current and future objectives from the president, the head of the Presidential Administration of the Republic of Kazakhstan and its relevant deputy, and will work under the general direction of the Presidential Administration of the Republic of Kazakhstan and operational management of the relevant Deputy Head of the Presidential Administration of the Republic of Kazakhstan.

== Structure ==
The Kazakhstan Institute for Strategic Studies carries out its research and analysis of foreign policy, security and information security, social and political as well as economic issues within the following departments:

- Department of Foreign Policy and International Security Analysis;
- Department of Social and Political Analysis;
- Department of Economic Analysis;
- Information and Publishing Department.

== Research Areas ==
Strategic aspects of foreign policy:

- domestic political and socio-economic development in the neighboring countries;
- Kazakhstan's bilateral relations with Russia, China, Turkey, the United States, EU and CIS states;
- integration issues on the post-Soviet space;
- security issues.

Political and social processes in contemporary Kazakhstan:

- strategic aspects of social and political development of Kazakhstan;
- democratization and establishment of political institutions in Kazakhstan;
- current political developments in Kazakhstan.

Economic security:

- economic security issues of Kazakhstan;
- global economic tendencies and their impact on Kazakhstan;
- globalization and its implications for Kazakhstan;
- current socio-economic developments in Kazakhstan.

== KazISS Directors ==
- June 1993 – May 1997 – Umirserik Kassenov
- May 1997 – December 1997 – Lev Tarakov
- December 1997 – April 1998 – Alma Sultangaliyeva
- April 1998 – May 2000 – Yermukhamet Yertysbayev
- May 2000 – May 2005 – Maulen Ashimbayev
- May 2005 – October 2014 – Bulat Sultanov
- October 2014 – February 2017 – Erlan Karin
- February 2017 – January 2022 – Zarema Shaukenova
- January 2022 – present – Yerkin Tukumov

== Publications ==
The Kazakhstan Institute for Strategic Studies publishes a large number of books both by individual experts and composite authors on international and domestic affairs, security issues and economics as well as three analytical journals. The Kazakhstan-Spectrum quarterly review in Russian (prior 1997 as Kazakhstan and International Community). The journal is recommended by the Committee for Control of Education and Science of the Ministry of Education and Science of the Republic of Kazakhstan for official publications required for PhD Candidates prior defending the theses in political science, international relations, history and economics. Since 2003, the KazISS publishes the Qogham zhane Dauir in Kazakh and Central Asia's Affairs in English. From 2000 to 2012 the KazISS published the Analytic journal in Russian that was issued six times a year.
