= Bibigül Jeksenbai =

Kazakh politician

- Бибігүл Жексенбай

Deputy Chair of the National Kurultai
- Incumbent
- Assumed office 14 June 2022 Serving with Erlan Qarin
- Chairman: Kassym-Jomart Tokayev
- Preceded by: position established

Senator of Kazakhstan from Astana
- Incumbent
- Assumed office 16 January 2023

Personal details
- Born: 2 December 1971 (age 54) East Kazakhstan Region, Kazakh SSR, Soviet Union
- Children: 2
- Education: Al-Farabi Kazakh National University; Kazakh Ablai Khan University of International Relations and World Languages; International Academy of Business
- Occupation: Journalist; documentalist

Bibıgül Nurğaliqyzy Jeksenbai (Note: Often transliterated as Bibigul Nurgalievna Zheksenbai through a Russified Romanization of Бибигуль Нургалиевна Жексенбай.) (BEE-buh-gool jack-son-BYE; Kazakh: Бибігүл Нұрғалиқызы Жексенбай; born 2 December 1971) is a Kazakh politician and former journalist, who's currently serving as Senator of Kazakhstan from Astana since January 2023. Alongside Erlan Qarin, she is Deputy Chair of the National Kurultai under President Tokayev since June 2022.

== Early life and education ==
Jeksenbai was born on 2 December 1971 in East Kazakhstan Region.

She attended Al-Farabi Kazakh National University to become a journalist from 1989 to 1994 and the Kazakh Ablai Khan University of International Relations and World Languages to study documentalism from 2000 to 2002.

From 2010 to 2012, Jeksenbai studied business administration at the International Academy of Business.

== Career ==
=== Journalism and television career ===
According to the official website of the Senate of Kazakhstan, Jeksenbai began her career in 1991 as a journalist at the "Sport" Republican Newspaper. After this, from 1993 to 1994, she worked as journalist at the Jas Alaş newspaper. After this, until 1996, she was employed by the "Atamūra-Stolichnoye obozreniye".

In the years between 1996 and 2007, Jeksenbai was an editor and producer at the Khabar Agency, as well as the deputy director of its Central Bureau. From June to December 2007, she was a director of the Directorate of Information and Analytical Programs at the Qazaqstan Radio and Television Corporation.

From there and until September 2008, Jeksenbai was Deputy General Director at Qazaqstan Radio and Television Corporation. After this, until May 2010, she worked as Deputy General Director – Main Editor at the "Era" TV channel. From 2010 to 2016, she held leading positions at the TV channel Seventh Channel.

From April to October 2019, she was General Director of the Astana TV television channel.

=== Political career ===
In November 2016, Jeksenbai was appointed an Advisor to the Chair of the Senate of Kazakhstan on issues of interaction with the media. She held the position until April 2019.

Since 14 June 2022, she is the Deputy Chairperson of the National Kurultai alongside Erlan Qarin and since 16 January 2023, she is Member of the Senate of Kazakhstan from Astana.

== Awards and honors ==
Jeksenbai's awards and honors include:

- Order of Kurmet (2012)
- Order of Parasat (2025)
- Medal "Ten years to the Independence of Kazakhstan"
- Medal "Ten years to the Parliament of Kazakhstan"

== Personal life ==
Jeksenbai has a husband and two sons.
