= Yrys Ordo =

Convention center in Bishkek, Kyrgyzstan

- Ырыс Ордо

General information
- Location: Bishkek, Kyrgyzstan
- Inaugurated: 24 August 2026
- Owner: Presidential Property Management Department, Government of Kyrgyzstan

Technical details
- Floor area: 39,000 m^{2}

Other information
- Seating capacity: 2,000

Yrys Ordo (Kyrgyz: Ырыс Ордо, lit. 'Palace of Prosperity', also translated as Irys Ordo) is a multi-purpose convention center in Bishkek, Kyrgyzstan.

== History ==
The complex was constructed on the former site of the Soviet-era VDNKh in Bishkek and was created as part of a broader initiative by President Sadyr Japarov to modernize the capital and its infrastructure. The complex was officially inaugurated by Japarov on August 24, 2026.

== Areas ==
- "Kurultai" Conference Hall
- Banquet Hall
- Press Centre
- VIP Guest Houses

== Events ==
- 2026 Shanghai Cooperation Organisation summit
- People's Kurultai of Kyrgyzstan meetings

== See also ==
- Ala Archa State Residence
- Yntymak Ordo
