= Murat Ergeshbayev =

Kazakh politician (born 1966)

Murat Ergeşbaev
- Мұрат Ергешбаев
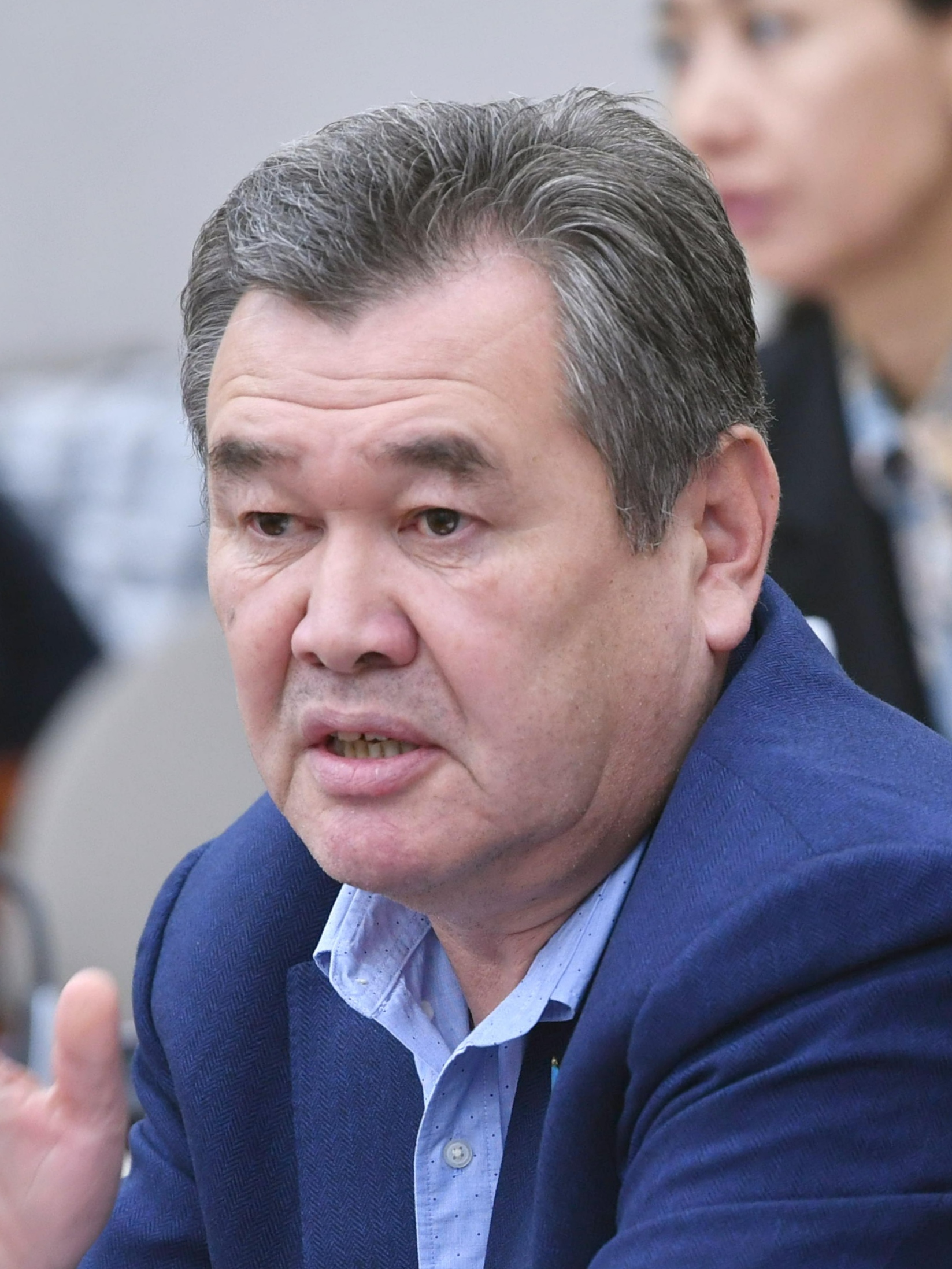
- Ergeşbaev in 2023

Akim of Kyzylorda Region
- Incumbent
- Assumed office 8 May 2026
- President: Kassym-Jomart Tokayev
- Preceded by: Nurlybek Nalibaev

Member of the 8th Mäjilis
- In office 28 March 2023 – 8 May 2026
- Party list: Amanat

Akim of Kyzylorda city
- In office 11 June 2008 – 31 May 2011
- President: Nursultan Nazarbayev
- Preceded by: Serik Kojaniyazov
- Succeeded by: Markhabat Jaiymbetov

Personal details
- Born: 12 April 1966 (age 60) Kyzylorda Region, Kazakh SSR, Soviet Union
- Party: Amanat
- Education: Academy of Public Administration
- Alma mater: Almaty Institute of National Economy
- Awards: Order of Kurmet; Order of Parasat

Murat Nälqojaūly Ergeşbaev (Note: Often transliterated as Murat Nalkhozhaevich Ergeshbaev through a Russified Romanization of Мурат Нальхожаевич Ергешбаев.) (Kazakh: Мұрат Нәлқожаұлы Ергешбаев; born 12 April, 1966) is a Kazakh politician serving as the akim of Kyzylorda Region since 2026. Previously, he served as the member of Mäjilis of the Parliament from 2023 to 2026 and akim of Kyzylorda city from 2008 to 2010.

== Early life and education ==
Murat Nalkojauly Ergeshbayev was born on April 12, 1966, in Kyzylorda Region, Kazakh Soviet Socialist Republic, Soviet Union (now Kazakhstan). His father, Nalkoja Aqbalauly Ergeshbayev (1931–1997), was the first secretary of the Terenozek and Syrdarya district committees of the Communist Party of Kazakhstan during the Soviet era. He was awarded the Orders of Lenin, the Badge of Honor, and the Red Banner of Labour. A bust monument dedicated to him was erected in the village of Tasboget, and a public museum has been established there.

In 1989, Murat Ergeshbayev graduated from the Almaty Institute of National Economy (now Narxoz University) with a degree in agricultural planning. Later, he earned a degree in public administration from the Academy of Public Administration under the president of Kazakhstan in 1999.

== Early career ==
Ergeshbayev began his career at age 23 after graduation from the Almaty Institute of National Economy in 1989, in his native region at the Jambyl sovkhoz in the Syrdarya district. A year later, he was appointed head of the planning and economic department (PEO) of the Syrdarya agro-industrial association.

From 1993 to 1996 he worked at the Kyzylorda regional branch of Alem Bank Kazakhstan (now BTA Bank), first as a specialist, then as head of the credit department, and ultimately as deputy director.

In 1996, he became an adviser to the deputy äkim (governor) of Kyzylorda Region. After three years in the akimat (city hall), he was appointed head of the Kyzylorda regional branch of the Halyk Bank.

In 2002, Ergeshbayev joined the regional Department of Labour, Employment and Social Protection as deputy head. In 2004, he was appointed head of the Finance Department of the Kyzylorda city akimat.

From 2006 to 2008 he served as vice-President for Economics and Finance at JSC “Firefighter” (Kazakh: Өрт сөндіруші) under the Ministry of Emergency Situations.

== Political career ==
On June 11, 2008, with the approval of the city maslikhat deputies and by decree of Kyzylorda Region akim Bolatbek Kuandykov, Ergeshbayev was appointed akim of Kyzylorda city. Two years later, on June 19, 2010, he was appointed head of the regional Finance Department.

By decree of Kyzylorda Region äkim Bolatbek Kuandykov, on May 31, 2011, he was appointed äkim of Karmakshy District. He was relieved of that post on February 14, 2013, and appointed akim of Shieli District.

In March 2015, he joined KazAgroProduct as managing director and chief of staff. On June 27, 2017, Ergeshbayev headed the regional Department for Employment Coordination and Social Programs in Kyzylorda Region.

Four months later, on October 6, 2017, Ergeshbayev was appointed akim of Kazaly District. On May 28, 2021, with the agreement of the Syrdarya District maslihat and by decree of region akim Gulshara Abdykhalikova, he was appointed akim of Syrdarya District.

=== Majilis ===
On February 15, 2023, the Central Election Commission elected him by resolution No. 43/719 as a member, and following the 2023 Kazakh legislative election on March 28, he was registered as a member of the Majilis of the 8th convocation under the Amanat party by resolution No. 69/761. His powers as akim of Syrdarya District were terminated the same day.

=== Akim of Kyzylorda Region ===
On May 8, 2026, president Kassym-Jomart Tokayev proposed Ergeshbayev and Ardak Zebeshev for the post of akim of Kyzylorda Region. Following an open vote, 81% of the local maslihat members voted for Ergeshbayev, while 19% voted for Zebeshev. After winning the vote and by Tokayev's decree No. 1271 Ergeshbayev was appointed 11th akim of the Kyzylorda Region. On the same day, his parliamentary mandate was terminated early.

== Personal life ==
Ergeshbayev has no publicly available information about his personal life, and speaks Kazakh and Russian.

== Awards ==
- Order of Kurmet (2011)
- Order of Parasat (2025)
