= List of Äkims of Kyzylorda Region =

This is the list of äkıms of Qyzylorda Region who have held the position since 1992.

== List of Äkıms ==
No.	Äkım (birth–death)		Term of office			Political party	Ref
No.	Portrait	Name	Took office	Left office	Time in office	Political party	Ref
1		Seilbek Shaukhamanov; Сейілбек Шаухаманов (1939–2018)	10 February 1992	29 September 1995	3 years, 7 months	Independent	
2		Berdibek Saparbayev; Бердiбек Сапарбаев (1953–2023)	29 September 1995	26 July 1999	3 years, 9 months	Otan	
3		Serikbay Nurgisaev; Серікбай Нұрғисаев (born 1956)	26 July 1999	5 April 2004	4 years, 8 months	Nur Otan	—
4		Ikram Adyrbekov; Икрам Адырбеков (born 1950)	5 April 2004	11 January 2007	2 years, 9 months	Nur Otan	
5		Mukhtar Kul-Mukhammed; Мұхтар Құл-Мұхаммед (born 1960)	11 January 2007	12 May 2008	1 year, 4 months	Nur Otan	—
6		Bolatbek Kuandykov; Болатбек Қуандықов (born 1969)	12 May 2008	16 January 2013	4 years, 8 months	Nur Otan	
7		Krymbek Kusherbayev; Қырымбек Көшербаев (born 1955)	17 January 2013	28 June 2019	6 years, 5 months	Nur Otan	
8		Kuanyshbek Iskakov; Қуанышбек Ысқақов (born 1968)	28 June 2019	28 March 2020	9 months	Nur Otan	
9		Gulshara Abdykhalikova; Гүлшара Әбдіқалықова (born 1965)	28 March 2020	7 April 2022	2 years	Amanat	
10		Nurlybek Nalibaev; Нұрлыбек Нәлібаев (born 1976)	7 April 2022	6 May 2026	4 years	Amanat	
11		Murat Ergeshbayev; Мұрат Ергешбаев (born 1966)	8 May 2026	Incumbent	3 months	Amanat	
