= Mukhtar Kul-Mukhammed =

Kazakh politician (born 1960)

Mukhtar Qul-Mukhammed
- Мұхтар Құл-Мұхаммед
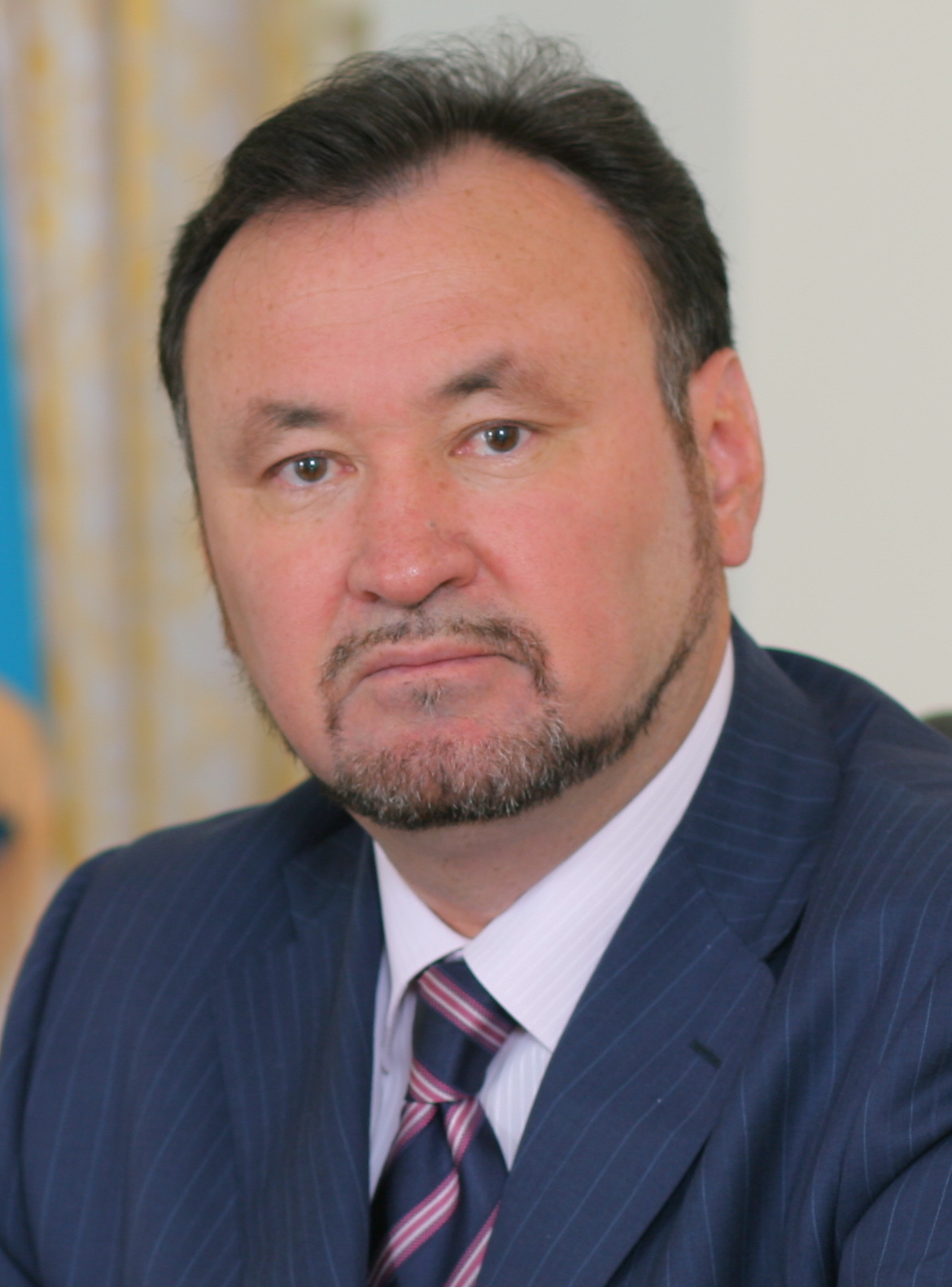

State Secretary of Kazakhstan
- In office 23 January 2012 – 16 January 2013
- President: Nursultan Nazarbayev
- Preceded by: Kanat Saudabayev
- Succeeded by: Marat Tazhin

Minister of Culture and Information
- In office 16 January 2013 – 11 March 2014
- President: Nursultan Nazarbayev
- Prime Minister: Serik Akhmetov
- Preceded by: Darhan Mynbai
- Succeeded by: Arystanbek Muhamediuly (Culture)

Minister of Culture
- In office 12 May 2008 – 23 January 2012
- President: Nursultan Nazarbayev
- Prime Minister: Karim Massimov
- Preceded by: Ermukhamet Ertysbayev (Culture and Information)
- Succeeded by: Darhan Mynbai (Culture and Information)

Minister of Culture, Information and Public Accord
- In office 4 May 2001 – 13 September 2003
- President: Nursultan Nazarbayev
- Prime Minister: Daniyal Akhmetov; Imangali Tasmagambetov; Kassym-Jomart Tokayev
- Preceded by: Altynbek Sarsenbayuly
- Succeeded by: Darhan Mynbai (Culture)

Member of the Senate
- In office 1 February 2018 – 24 January 2023
- Appointed by: Nursultan Nazarbayev
- In office 30 November 1999 – 4 May 2001
- Appointed by: Nursultan Nazarbayev

Äkim of Kyzylorda Region
- In office 11 January 2007 – 12 May 2008
- Preceded by: Ikram Adorbekov
- Succeeded by: Bolatbek Quandyqov

First Deputy Chairman of Nur Otan
- In office 6 May 2016 – 1 February 2018
- Chairman: Nursultan Nazarbayev
- Preceded by: Askar Myrzakhmetov
- Succeeded by: Mäulen Äşimbaev

Personal details
- Born: 12 December 1960 (age 65) Tacheng, China
- Party: Nur-Otan
- Children: 8
- Education: Al-Farabi Kazakh National University

Mukhtar Abraruly Kul-Mukhammed (Kazakh: Мұхтар Абрарұлы Құл-Мұхаммед, مۇحتار ابرارۇلى قۇل-مۇحاممەد, Mūhtar Abrarūly Qūl-Mūhammed, [mʊχˈtɑr ɑbrɑrʊˈɫɤ qʊɫ‿mʊχɑˈmʲet]; born 12 December 1960) is a Kazakh statesman and politician, Deputy of the Senate of the Parliament of the Republic of Kazakhstan, Candidate of Historical Sciences (1995), Doctor of Law (1999), Professor, Member of the National Academy of Sciences of the Republic of Kazakhstan.

== Biography ==
=== Early life and career ===
Kul-Mukhammed was born to a Kazakh Muslim family in Chuguchak, China. In 1961, He along with his family returned to their historic homeland of Kazakhstan and settled in the village of Makanchi in the district of East Kazakhstan Region. In 1982, he graduated from the Al-Farabi Kazakh National University with a degree in journalism. From 1983 to 1992, Kul-Mukhammed had been holding positions such as a Scientific Editor, a Senior Scientific Editor, head of Editorial Office of Philosophy, Law and Sociology, an executive secretary and deputy editor of the main edition of the Kazakh Soviet Encyclopedia.

From 1992 to 1999, he was the director of Atamura enterprise, the chairman of JSC Atamura and the president of Atamura corporation. From 1994 to 1999, Kul-Mukhammed worked at the Al-Farabi Kazakh National University as a senior lecturer, an associate professor, and as an acting professor.

In 1995, he defended his candidate thesis in the field of history named Problems of social and political history of Kazakhstan in XVIII century and the beginning of XIX century. In 1999, Kul-Mukhammed earned a PhD from his thesis in the field of jurisprudence on the topic: Zhakyp Akpaev and the evolution of political and legal views of Alash figures (the end of the XIX-and the beginning of the XX century).

=== Political career ===
From 30 November 1999, he was a member of the Senate of Kazakhstan, where he served as a Secretary of the Senate Committee on Legislation and Judicial-Legal Reform and the chairman of the Senate Committee on Socio-Cultural Development. In 2001, by the decision of the Presidium of the Higher Attestation Commission of the Republic of Kazakhstan dated 31 May 2001, he was awarded an academic title of Professor in Law.

On 4 May 2001, Kul-Mukhammed was appointed as the Minister of Culture, Information and Public Accord of Kazakhstan until his dismissal on 13 September 2003. From 31 April 2004 to 10 January 2007, he served as the Akorda Press Secretary. While occupying the post, Kul-Mukhammed was the deputy head of the Presidential Administration from 2006. On 11 January 2007, he was appointed the akim of Kyzylorda Region. While serving as the akim, Kul-Mukhammed became the Special Representative of the President of the Republic of Kazakhstan on Baikonur complex on 21 March 2008.

On 12 May 2008, Kul-Mukhammed became the Minister of Culture until 23 January 2012, when he was appointed as the State Secretary of Kazakhstan. From 16 January 2013 to 11 March 2014, Kul-Mukhammed served as the Minister of Culture and Information. From 2014 to 2016, he periodically held posts as the advisor to the President of Kazakhstan.

In 2015, he led public campaign in the support of the candidacy of Nursultan Nazarbayev in the 2015 Kazakh presidential election.

On 6 May 2016, Kul-Mukhammed was appointed as the First Deputy Chairman of Nur Otan. He held that position until he was dismissed on 1 February 2018, after becoming a member of the Senate of Kazakhstan. Since 28 March 2019, he's been the head of the Senate Committee on International Relations, Defense and Security. On 23 January 2023, the President of the Republic of Kazakhstan, Tokayev, signed a decree on the termination of the powers of the deputy of the Senate, Kul-Mukhammed Mukhtar.
