= Kurultai =

Mongol and Turkic term for a political council

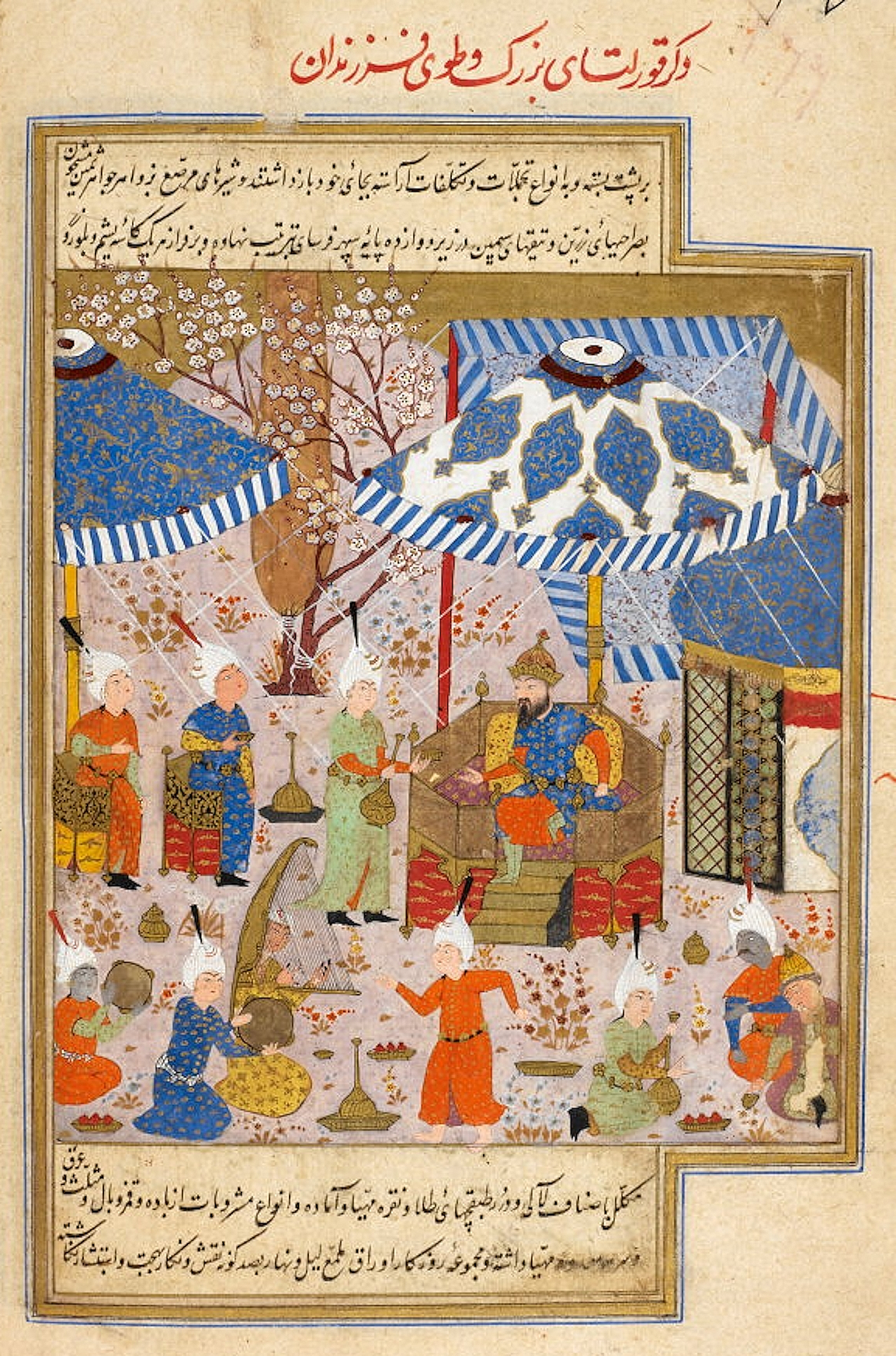
Timur's great 'kurultai', from a 16th century copy of Sharaf al-Din Ali Yazdi's Zafarnama

A kurultai (/kʊrʊlˈtaɪ/, lit. 'gathering'), (Note: Derived from Russian курултай [kʊrʊɫˈtaj], ultimately from Middle Mongol ᠬᠤᠷᠠᠯᠲᠠᠢ Qurŭldai [ˌq͡χʊɾʊ̆ɬˈtaɪ̯] (Modern Mongol: [ˌχʊɾə̆ɬˈtæː]), whence Chinese 忽里勒台 Hūlǐlēitái (Dungan: Хўрылтэ); Kyrgyz: Курултай / Qurultay / قۇرۇلتاي; Kazakh: Құрылтай / Qūryltai / قۇرىلتاي; Tatar: Корылтай / Qorıltay; Bashkir: Qoroltay / Ҡоролтай; Yakut: Курултаай / Kurultây; Azerbaijani: Qurultay / Гурултай / قرلتای; Turkmen: Gurultaý / Гурултай; Crimean Tatar: Qurultay / Къурултай; Turkish: Kurultay (Ottoman Turkish: قورلتای).) also spelled as quriltai, was a medieval political and military council consisting of members of a Mongol khan's family, imperial sons-in-law, captains of the army and others during and before the Mongol empire.

== Etymology ==
According to the Old Turkic–Russian dictionary, the oldest recorded pre-Genghis Khan mention of the root word "Qur" is found in Dīwān Lughāt al-Turk (11th century), where it was used as a verb meaning 'to assemble, to assemble into a formation, to build'. The root word and the word kurultai are currently in use in numerous Turkic languages. According to another hypothesis, the root of the term is from the hypothetical Proto-Mongolic verb *kura-, *kurija- 'to collect, to gather' whence khural 'meeting, assembly' in Mongolic languages. From this same root arises the Mongolian word хурим khurim 'feast', which originally referred to large festive gatherings on the steppe, but it is now used mainly in the sense of 'wedding'.

== Mongol Empire ==
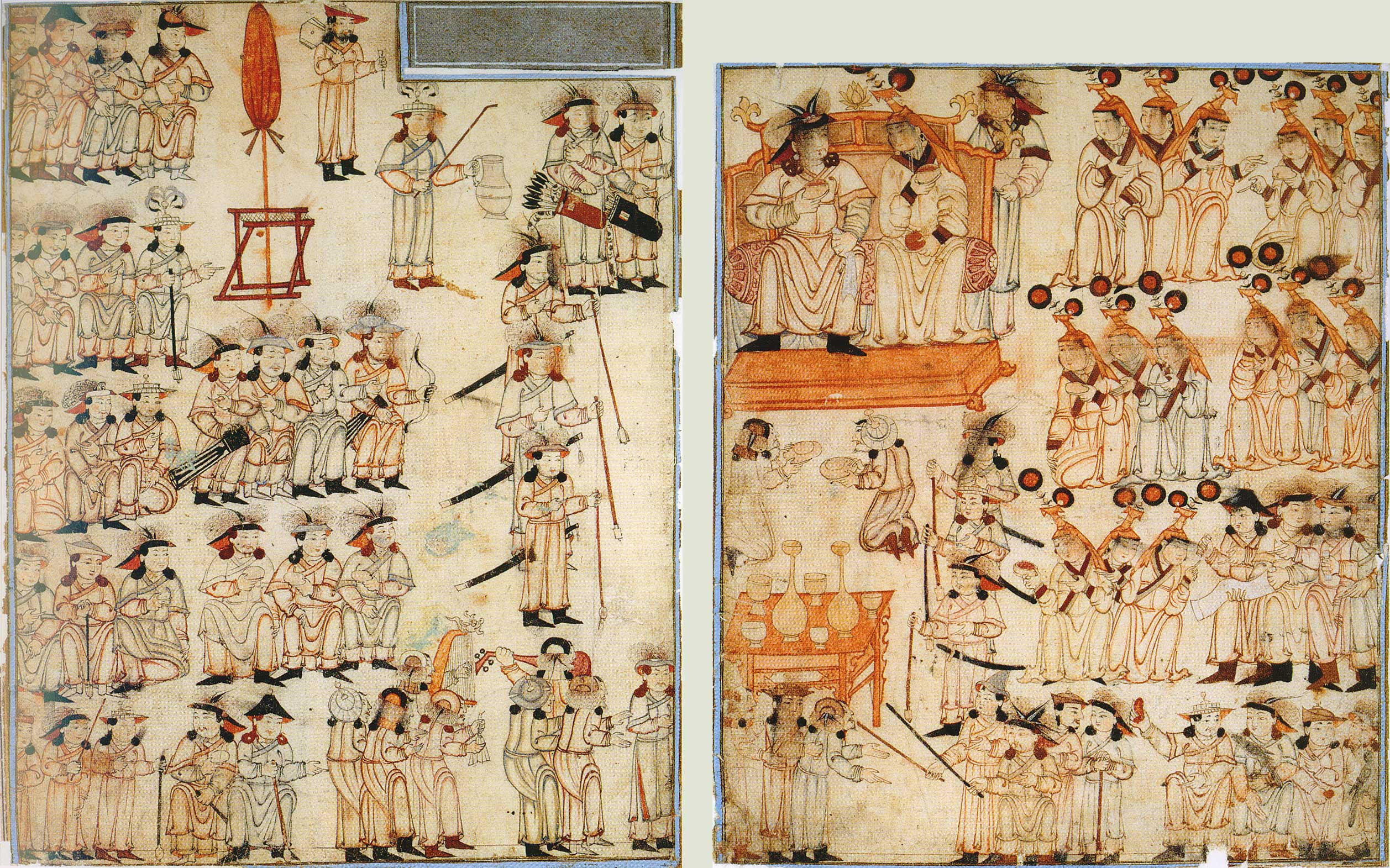
Enthronement of a Mongol khan, 14th century

All Great Khans of the Mongol Empire, were formally elected in a kurultai; khans of subordinate Mongol states, such as the Golden Horde, were elected by a similar regional kurultai.

The election of Temujin to Genghis Khan is a topic which is brief, but touched on in the Secret history of the Mongols.

And so, when the people of the felt walled tents had been brought to allegiance, the year of the tiger (1206) they all gathered at the source of the Onan river. They hoisted the white standard with nine tails and there they gave Chinggis Qa’an the title of Qan.

During the kurultai, Mongol chiefs would convene to choose the next great khan among other things. The kurultai was often, but not always, held in the capital of the Mongol Empire. They were also a time to assign all critical positions of leadership, as well as an opportunity to decide the military direction to be implemented under the new khan and leadership.

After the new khan was elected, an elaborate enthronement procedure followed. Johann Schiltberger, a 15th-century German traveler, described the installation of a new Golden Horde khan as follows:

When they choose a king, they take him and seat him on white felt, and raise him in it three times. Then they lift him up and carry him round the tent, and seat him on a throne, and put a golden sword in his hand. Then he must be sworn as is the custom.

Kurultai were imperial and tribal assemblies convened to determine, strategize and analyze military campaigns and assign individuals to leadership positions and titles. Though no laws were written down during a kurultai, they were important political events and determined policies. Genghis Khan was declared khan in the kurultai of 1206. Most of the major military campaigns were first planned out at assemblies such as this and there were minor and less significant kurultai under the Mongol Empire under political subordinate leaders and generals.

The kurultai, however, required the presence of senior members from across the empire to participate, who were generally also military leaders. Without the participation of elites from across the empire the decision of any kurultai was viewed as illegitimate or no action was taken. As well, a fully plenary attendance at a kurultai was sometimes indicated by the phrase ‘aqa and ini,’ meaning literally ‘older and younger brothers’. Thus, after the deaths of Ögedei and Möngke in 1241 and 1259, respectively, necessitated the withdrawal of Mongol leaders (and troops) from the outskirts of Vienna and Venice (in 1241) and from Syria (in 1259), hamstringing military operations against the Austrians and Mamluks that might otherwise have continued.

Although the kurultai was a serious political event in the Mongol world, it was also a festival of sorts including great feasting and various traditional games. Many of these traditions have been carried on in the modern-day Mongolian event Naadam, which includes Mongolian wrestling, horse racing and archery competitions. Women also attended kurultai, however, they could not vote.

== Modern usage ==
=== Politics ===
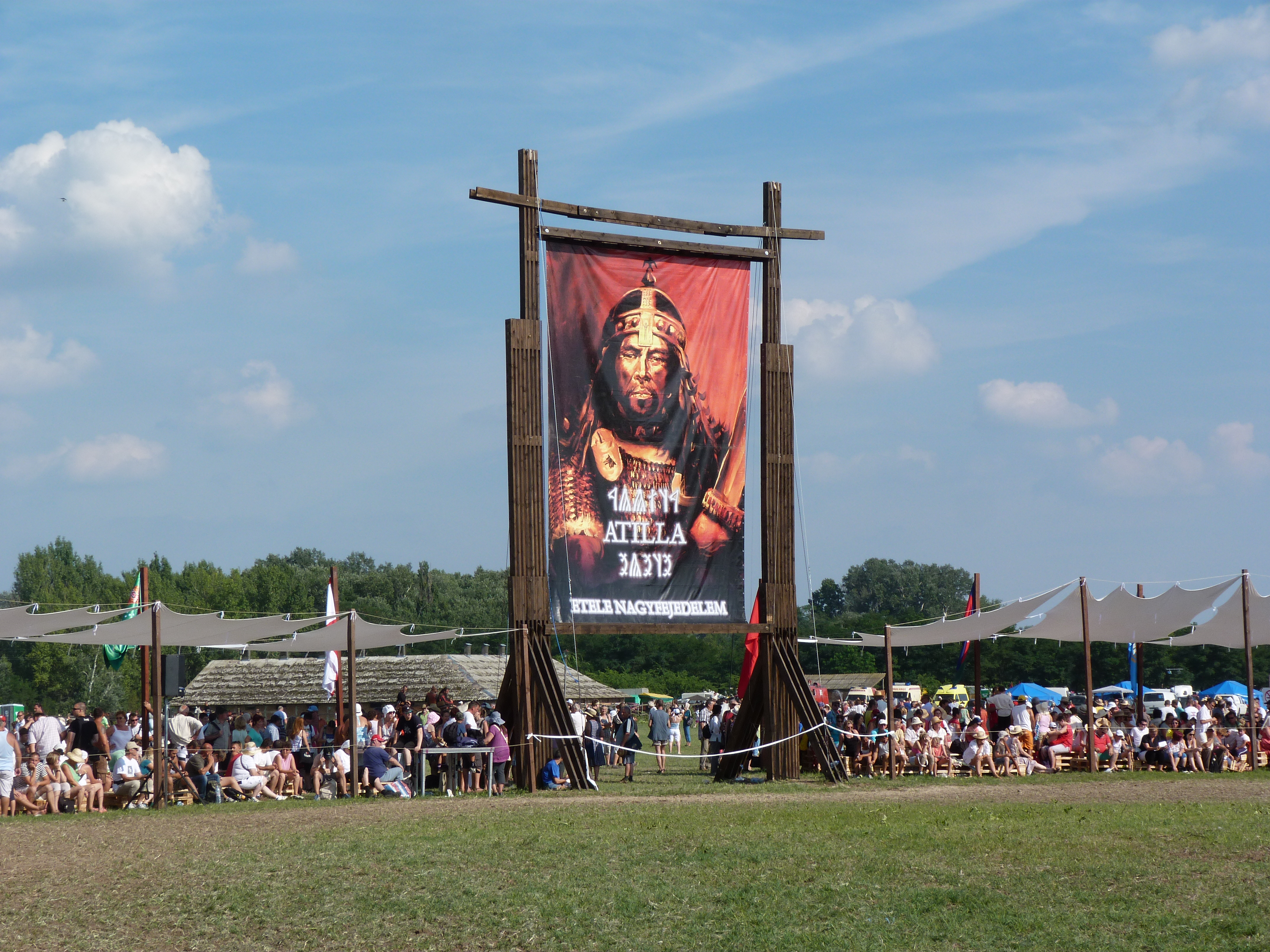
Kurultai in Hungary

Various modern Mongol and Turkic peoples use it in the political or administrative sense, as a synonym for parliament, congress, conference, council, assembly, convention, gathering. Examples include the Kese Qoroltay (lit. 'Lesser Kurultai'), the World Qoroltai of the Bashkirs, the Qurultay of the Crimean Tatar People, the National Kurultai of Kazakhstan, the People's Kurultai of Kyrgyzstan, the State Great Khural of Mongolia, the State Assembly — Kurultai of Bashkortostan, the People's Khural of Buryatia, El Kurultai of Altai Republic and Kurultáj held today in Hungary.

=== Language ===
In Mongolian, the following forms of the word are still in use today: khuraldai, khuraldaan and khural. Ulsin Deed Shuukhiin Khuraldaan means "session of the National Supreme Court".

Other spellings include: kurultay, qurultay, qurıltai, qorıltay, and qoroltay.

The word has several modern usages in the modern Turkish language as well, e.g. Yükseköğretim Kurulu "Higher Education Council", genel kurul toplantısı "general board meeting". Kurultay is also a commonly used word in modern Turkish meaning "general assembly", such as for organisations, committees etc. Kurmak is also a verb in Turkish meaning "to set up, assemble, put together". It is also used for "extraordinary conventions" (Turkish: Olağanüstü Kurultay) of political parties.

== See also ==
- Great Kurultáj
- Jirga
- Kurultai (Kazakhstan)
- Majlis
- People's Kurultai of Kyrgyzstan
- State Great Khural
- Thing (assembly)
- Veche
- Witan
- World Nomad Games
- World Turks Qurultai
