= Nurlybek Nalibaev =

Kazakh politician (born 1976)

- Нұрлыбек Нәлібаев
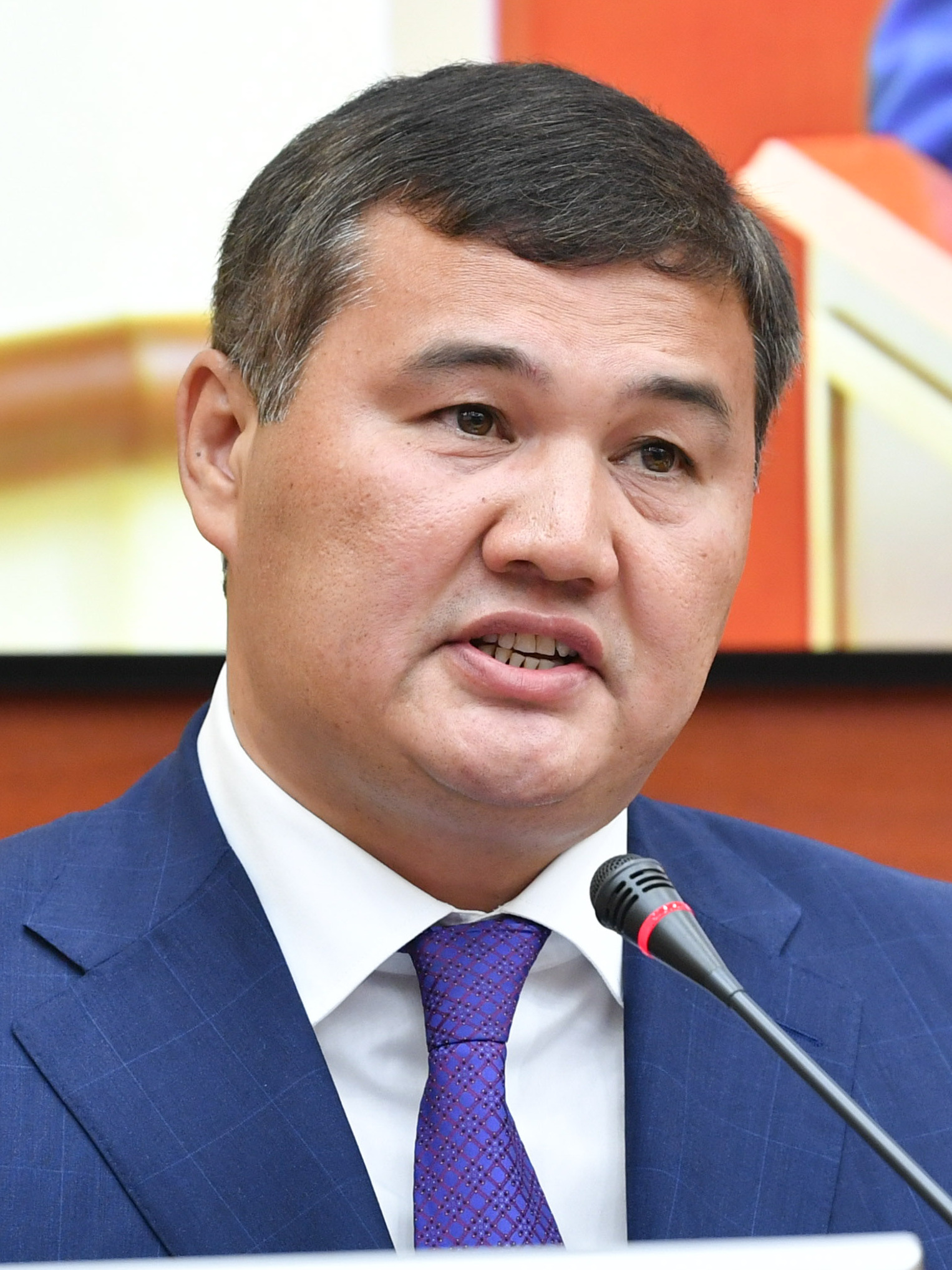
- Nalibaev in 2022

First Deputy Prime Minister of Kazakhstan
- Incumbent
- Assumed office 6 May 2026
- President: Kassym-Jomart Tokayev
- Prime Minister: Oljas Bektenov
- Preceded by: Roman Sklyar

Äkim of Kyzylorda Region
- In office 7 April 2022 – 6 May 2026
- President: Kassym-Jomart Tokayev
- Prime Minister: Älihan Smaiylov; Roman Sklyar (acting); Oljas Bektenov
- Preceded by: Gulshara Abdykhalikova
- Succeeded by: Murat Ergeshbayev

Äkim of Kyzylorda
- In office 13 February 2013 – 2 April 2021
- President: Nursultan Nazarbayev; Kassym-Jomart Tokayev
- Preceded by: Markhabat Zhaimbetov
- Succeeded by: Ganibek Kazantaev

Personal details
- Born: 13 October 1976 (age 49) Kyzylorda Region, Kazakh SSR, Soviet Union
- Party: Amanat
- Spouse: Mälika Syzdyqova
- Children: 3
- Education: Kazakh National Agrarian University (1997); Maqsut Narikbayev University (2003)
- Profession: Economist; lawyer

Nurlybek Mashbekovich Nalibayev (Kazakh: Нұрлыбек Машбекұлы Нәлібаев, romanized: Nūrlybek Maşbekūly Nälıbaev; born 13 October 1976) is a Kazakh lawyer and politician who has served as First Deputy Prime Minister of Kazakhstan since May 2026. He was Äkim of Kyzylorda Region from 2022 and the Äkim of Kyzylorda from 2013 to 2021. He is a member of the Amanat party. He holds an education in economics and law and is a Candidate of Economic Sciences.

== Biography ==
Nalibaev was born on 13 October 1976 in the Janakorgan district of the Kyzylorda region. He comes from the Jamanbai clan of the Konyrat tribe. He has a father, Nalibayev Mashbek Saparbaevich (1926–2004), who was a collective farm foreman, and his mother, Nalibaeva Bibish Nurmanovna (1933–2004). He also has a brother, Berdibek Mashbekuly Saparbayev (1953–2023), who was the politician.

In 1997, he graduated from the Kazakh National Agrarian University in Almaty with a degree in management and economics. After graduation, he worked at the LLP "Kazakhoil-Commerce". From 1998 to 2005, he worked in the management of the companies "Bulak", "Standard Trade", "Standard Oil Base", "Standard Oil", "Standard Oil Trading", "Standard Gas", "Hurricane Oil Products", and "Kyzylorda Munay Service".

In 2003, he obtained a law degree from the Kazakh Humanities and Law University.

From 2005 to 2007, he served as the deputy akim (mayor) of the city of Kyzylorda, and from 2007 to 2008, he was the head of the akim's office of Kyzylorda region. From 8 February 2008 to 13 February 2013, he was the akim of the Chyyli district of Kyzylorda region.

From 2013 to 2021, he served as the akim of the city of Kyzylorda.

According to an expert survey on the effectiveness of akimat work conducted by the agency "Rating.kz" at the end of 2014, Naliyev was among the leaders.

From 2 April 2021 to 6 April 2022, he was the head of the regional development department of the Office of the Prime Minister of Kazakhstan.

On 7 April 2022, he was appointed akim of Kyzylorda Region.

On 6 May 2026, President Kassym-Jomart Tokayev appointed him First Deputy Prime Minister of Kazakhstan.

== Personal life ==
Nalibaev is married to Malika Mustafakyzy Syzdykova and had three children: son, Nazarbek (born 2002), and two daughters, Aiya (born 2004) and Aruna (born 2010).

== Awards ==
Order of the Leopard of the 3rd degree (2024)
Order of Kurmet (2011)
Medal «20 Years of Independence of the Republic of Kazakhstan» (2011)

Political offices
Preceded by Roman Sklyar	First Deputy Prime Minister of Kazakhstan; 2026–present	Incumbent
Preceded by Gulshara Abdykhalikova	Äkim of Kyzylorda Region; 2022–2026	Succeeded by Murat Ergeshbayev
Preceded by Markhabat Zhaimbetov	Äkim of Kyzylorda; 2013–2021	Succeeded by Ganibek Kazantaev
