= Krymbek Kusherbayev =

Kazakh politician (born 1955)

Qyrymbek Kösherbaev
- Қырымбек Көшербаев
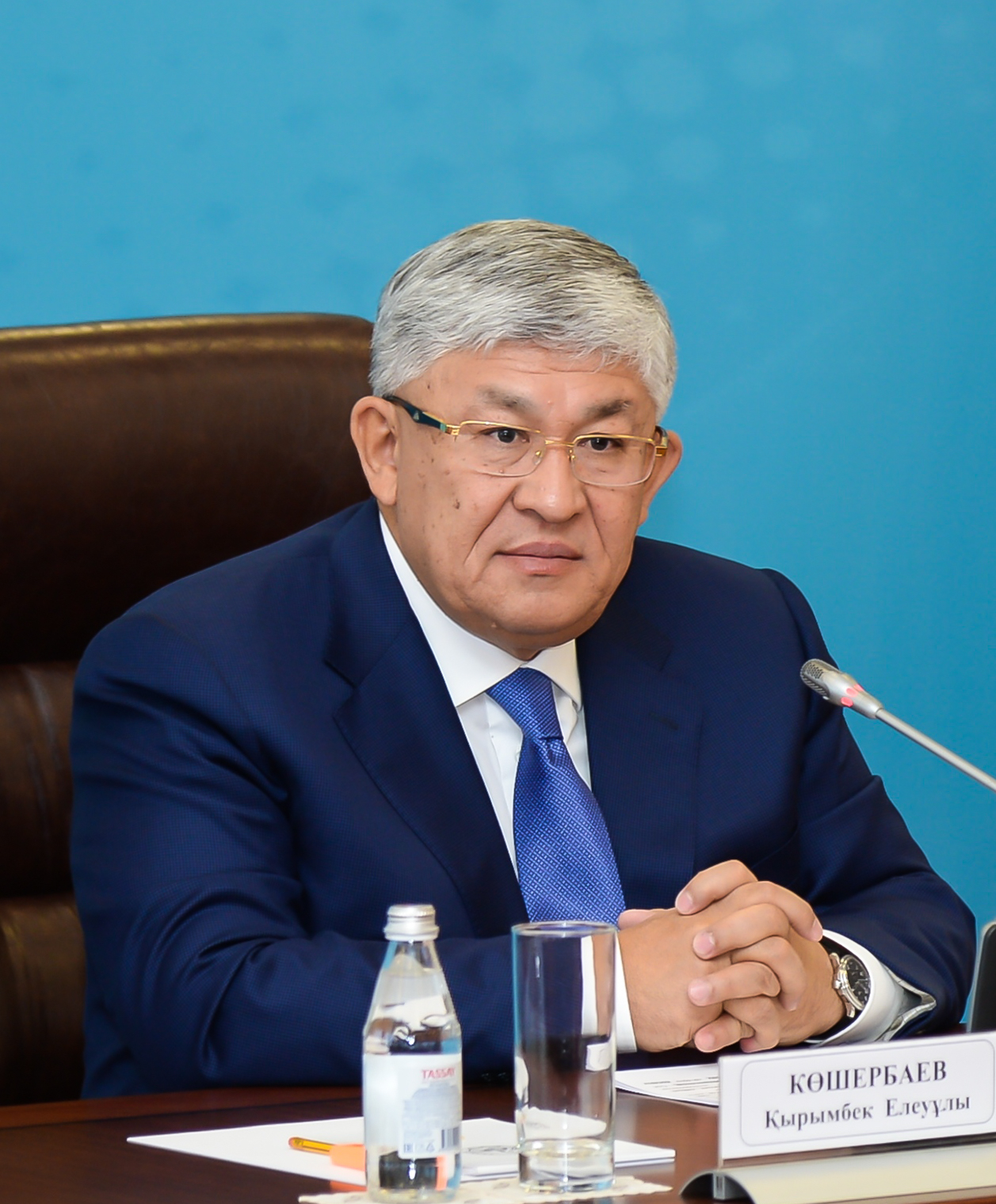
- Kösherbaev in 2017

State Secretary of Kazakhstan
- In office 18 September 2019 – 12 January 2022
- President: Qasym-Zhomart Toqaev
- Preceded by: Marat Täzhin
- Succeeded by: Erlan Qarin

Head of the Presidential Administration of Kazakhstan
- In office 28 June 2019 – 18 September 2019
- President: Qasym-Zhomart Toqaev
- First Deputy: Darkhan Kaletaev
- Preceded by: Baqytzhan Saghyntaev
- Succeeded by: Erlan Qoshanov

First Deputy Prime Minister of Kazakhstan
- In office 26 September 2012 – 16 January 2013
- Prime Minister: Serik Akhmetov
- Preceded by: Serik Akhmetov
- Succeeded by: Baqytzhan Saghyntaev

Minister of Education and Science
- In office 17 October 1997 – 18 December 2000
- President: Nursultan Nazarbaev
- Prime Minister: Nurlan Balghymbaev; Qasym-Zhomart Toqaev
- Preceded by: Imanghali Tasmaghambetov (Education and Culture); Vasily Devyatko (Healthcare)
- Succeeded by: Nuraly Bekturghanov (Education and Science); Altynbek Särsenbayuly (Culture, Information and Public Accord); Zhaqsylyq Dosqaliev (Healthcare)

Äkim of Qyzylorda Region
- In office 17 January 2013 – 28 June 2019
- Preceded by: Bolatbek Quandyqov
- Succeeded by: Quanyshbek Ysqaqov

Äkim of Manghystaw Region
- In office 24 January 2006 – 22 December 2011
- Preceded by: Bolat Palymbetov
- Succeeded by: Bauyrzhan Mukhametzhanov

Äkim of West Kazakhstan Region
- In office 18 December 2000 – 16 November 2003
- Preceded by: Qabibolla Zhaqypov
- Succeeded by: Nurghali Äshim

Personal details
- Born: 20 May 1955 (age 71) Qazaly, Qyzylorda Region, Kazakh SSR, Soviet Union
- Party: Amanat
- Other political affiliations: Communist Party (until 1991)
- Spouse: Gülnar Mataeva
- Children: 3
- Education: Sätbaev University; Academy of Sciences of the Soviet Union

Qyrymbek Elewuly Kösherbaev (Note: Often transliterated as Krymbek Eleuovich Kusherbayev through a Russified Romanization of Крымбек Елеуович Кушербаев.) (Kazakh: Қырымбек Елеуұлы Көшербаев, romanized: Qyrymbek Eleuūly Köşerbaev; born 20 May 1955) is a Kazakh politician who has served as the State Secretary of Kazakhstan since 2019. Prior to that, Kösherbaev served as the head of the Presidential Administration, äkim of Qyzylorda Region from 2013 to 2019, First Deputy Prime Minister of Kazakhstan from 2012 to 2013, äkim of Manghystaw Region from 2006 to 2011, Ambassador of Kazakhstan to Russia, Finland and Armenia from 2003 to 2006, äkim of West Kazakhstan Region from 2000 to 2003, and the Minister of Education and Science from 1997 to 2000.

== Biography ==
=== Early life and career ===
Kösherbaev was born in the city of Kazalinsk (present-day Qazaly) in the Qyzylorda Region. His father Elew Kösherbaev was also an eminent politician of the Qyzylorda Region and was the First Secretary of the Communist Party of several districts, such as Qarmaqshy and Qazaly. His grandfather Kösherbai Daribaev was the Hero of Socialist Labour. In 1978, Kösherbaev graduated from Sätbaev University as a specialist in civil engineering.

After graduating, Kösherbaev was an engineer and the chief of group of preparation of production PMK-112 "Glavrissovkhozstroi" in Qyzylorda. From 1979 to 1988, he held several positions at Komsomol of the Qyzylorda Region and Central Committee of the Komsomol in the Kazakh SSR.

Kösherbaev attended the Academy of Sciences of the Soviet Union from 1988 to 1991, where he earned specialty in political science. That same year, he served as the assistant of Speechwriting Office on Culture and the International Relations of the Administration of President of Kazakh SSR.

From 1991 to 1994, Kösherbaev was the assistant of the Deputy Prime Minister of Kazakhstan. In 1994, he became the head of the Kalinin District of Almaty. In 1995, Kösherbaev was appointed as the deputy of the Head of Administration of Department of Internal Policy of the Administration. That same year, he became the deputy of the Administration Head of Department of Territorial Development. From 1996 to 1997, Kösherbaev served as the Press Secretary and the Manager of the Press Service of the President.

=== Political career ===
In October 1997, he was appointed as the Minister of Health, Education and Sports and served that position until the ministry was reorganized into the Ministry of Education and Science where Kösherbaev led until he became the äkim of West Kazakhstan Region on 18 December 2000. In November 2003, he became an ambassador to Russia, along with Finland and Armenia.

On 24 January 2006, Kösherbaev was appointed as the äkim of Manghystaw Region. Following the Zhangaözen massacre where 14 oil workers in the city square were killed by police on 16 December 2011, during the Independence Day celebration, Kösherbaev stated "Let the journalists see with their own eyes what the criminals have done. They have already crossed the line, blood has been shed, human casualties have appeared. Now they have to answer to the fullest before the law." Shortly after the tragic event, on 22 December 2011, Kösherbaev was dismissed from his post by President Nursultan Nazarbaev and was succeeded by a Senator and Former Minister of Internal Affairs Bauyrzhan Mukhamedzhanov.

On 13 July 2012, he became an adviser to the President of Kazakhstan and served the office until 26 September 2012, when Kösherbaev was appointed as the First Deputy Prime Minister under Akhmetov's government. He was shortly replaced by Baqytzhan Saghyntaev on 16 January 2013. The following day, on 17 January 2013, Kösherbaev was appointed as the äkim of Qyzylorda Region.

On 28 June 2019, Kösherbaev was appointed as the head of the Presidential Administration of Kazakhstan by Qasym-Zhomart Toqaev. He served that position until he became the State Secretary of Kazakhstan on 18 September 2019. On January 5, 2022, he was relieved of his post as Secretary of State.

In November 2022, Kösherbaev, by decision of the board of "KazMunayGas", was elected a member of the Board of Directors of "Embamunaigas" JSC.

== Awards ==
- The Order of "Parasat" (2003)
- The Order of "Friendship" (the Russian Federation, 2006)
- The Order of "Barys" of ІІ degrees (2009)
- The Order of the First President of the Republic of Kazakhstan (2015)
