= Erlan Karin =

Kazakh politician (born 1976)

Yerlan Karin
- Ерлан Қарин
- Karin in 2017

Vice President of Kazakhstan
- Incumbent
- Assumed office 31 August 2026
- President: Kassym-Jomart Tokayev
- Preceded by: Yerik Asanbayev (1996)

First Deputy Aqorda Chief of Staff
- In office 30 June 2026 – 31 August 2026
- President: Kassym-Jomart Tokayev
- Chief of Staff: Roman Sklyar
- Preceded by: Darhan Satybaldy
- Succeeded by: TBD

State Counsellor of Kazakhstan
- In office 14 June 2022 – 30 June 2026
- President: Kassym-Jomart Tokayev
- Preceded by: Himself as State Secretary
- Succeeded by: Office Abolished

State Secretary of Kazakhstan
- In office 5 January 2022 – 14 June 2022
- President: Kassym-Jomart Tokayev
- Preceded by: Krymbek Kusherbayev
- Succeeded by: Himself as State Counsellor

Personal details
- Born: 26 May 1976 (age 50) Aksukent, Sairam District, Shymkent Region, Kazakh SSR, Soviet Union
- Party: Independent (2026–present)
- Other political affiliations: Asar (2003–2006); Amanat (2006–2026); Ädilet (2026)
- Education: Aktobe State University; Al-Farabi Kazakh National University
- Occupation: Politician

Yerlan Tynymbaiuly Karin (Kazakh: Ерлан Тынымбайұлы Қарин, romanized: Erlan Tynymbaiūly Qarin; born 26 May 1976) is a Kazakh politician who has served as the vice president of Kazakhstan since 31 August 2026. He previously served as first deputy head of the Presidential Administration from June to August 2026 and as state counsellor of Kazakhstan from June 2022 to June 2026. He also served as state secretary of Kazakhstan from January to June 2022, assistant to the president from 2020 to 2022, and advisor to the president from 2019 to 2020.

Karin has held senior roles in Kazakhstan's political and strategic institutions, including director of the Kazakhstan Institute for Strategic Studies and chairman of the Qazaqstan Radio and Television Corporation. He served as deputy chairman of the National Kurultai from 2022 to 2026 and chaired the Working Group on Parliamentary Reform in 2025, which developed proposals for the transition to a unicameral parliament. In January 2026, he became deputy chairman of the Constitutional Commission responsible for drafting the new constitution of Kazakhstan. In August 2026, he was nominated by President Kassym-Jomart Tokayev and approved by the Kurultai as vice president.

== Early life and education ==
Karin was born on 26 May 1976 in the village of Aksukent, Sairam District, Shymkent Region (now Turkestan Region).

In 1997, he graduated from the Faculty of History of K. Zhubanov Aktobe State University. In 1999, he completed postgraduate studies at the Faculty of Philosophy and Political Science of Al-Farabi Kazakh National University. He holds the academic degree of Candidate of Political Sciences. His dissertation was titled Internal Political Aspects of the National Security of the Republic of Kazakhstan.

== Early career ==
From 1996 to 1998, Karin worked as a teacher of history and geography at Secondary School No. 33 in Aktobe, while also lecturing at the Department of Political Science of Aktobe State University. During this period, he was actively involved in journalism, serving as editor-in-chief of the newspaper Aktobe University and contributing as a political columnist to regional newspapers, including Range.

Between 1998 and 2000, he was employed at the Center for Political Studies of the Institute of Development of Kazakhstan and served as deputy director of the Institute of Russia and China. From 2000 to 2003, Karin was director of the Central Asian Agency for Political Studies. In 2002, The Economist described him as a "rising star" among Kazakh experts in the field of geopolitics.

During years 2002–2003, he acted as a freelance adviser to the Prime Minister of Kazakhstan. From 2003 to 2004, he served as First Deputy Chairman of the Republican Party Asar, while also acting as director general of the International Institute of Modern Politics.

Between 2004 and 2006, Karin headed the Center for Counter-Terrorist Programs. In 2006, he was appointed adviser to the Akim of Mangistau Region on political affairs. On 14 February 2008, he became head of the Department of Internal Policy of the Administration of the President of the Republic of Kazakhstan, and on 6 November 2008 was appointed secretary of the Nur Otan People's Democratic Party for Strategic Development. He held this post until being dismissed on 29 August 2013, resigning in connection with a foreign internship.

From December 2013 to May 2014, Karin was a visiting professor at the American University in Washington, D.C.. On 16 October 2014, he was appointed director of the Kazakhstan Institute for Strategic Studies under the President of the Republic of Kazakhstan. On 9 February 2017, he was appointed chairman of the Board of the Qazaqstan Radio and Television Corporation.

In November 2018, Karin was awarded the title of Honorary Professor of Shanghai International Studies University during the China International Import Expo in Shanghai.

In 2019, while serving as a presidential adviser, Karin participated in an analytical and advisory role to Operation Jusan, Kazakhstan's humanitarian repatriation effort from Syria.

== Political career ==
=== Advisor to the President of Kazakhstan (2019–2020) ===
On 5 April 2019, Karin was appointed Advisor to the President of Kazakhstan by Qasym-Zhomart Toqaev. Soon after his appointment, Karin publicly commented on the legitimacy of the 2019 presidential elections, describing them as a key step in stabilizing Kazakhstan's political transition after Nursultan Nazarbaev's resignation. Since 2019, Karin also served as secretary of the National Council of Public Trust under the President of the Republic of Kazakhstan.

During his tenure, Karin explained aspects of Toqaev's first 2019 State of the Nation Address and emphasized the importance of public and civil dialogue in implementing presidential directives. He publicly rebutted misinformation, including social media rumors about Toqaev's early resignation and assertions about Chinese enterprises being transferred to Kazakhstan, characterizing them as manipulative.

In 2020, Karin emphasized the government's staged measures to prevent the spread of COVID-19 and commended the implementation of epidemiological controls, including quarantine procedures and monitoring of arrivals from abroad. He analyzed the effectiveness of these measures and underscored the role of both government coordination and citizen responsibility in combating the pandemic.

=== Assistant to the President of Kazakhstan (2020–2022) ===
Karin was appointed Assistant to the President of Kazakhstan on 30 July 2020. In this role, he was involved in coordinating the implementation of the President Toqaev's social, economic, and legislative initiatives across government bodies. During his tenure, he contributed to the monitoring and evaluation of the 2021 State of the Nation Address, which included a national plan with over one hundred specific points aimed at advancing presidential priorities.

He also played a role in the development and oversight of social and economic reforms, including the increase in minimum wage, improvements in infrastructure for people with disabilities, and updates to the criminal code. In addition, Karin supported the Tokayev administration's efforts in constitutional and legislative reforms, including electoral law amendments enacted in May 2021.

=== State Secretary of Kazakhstan (January–June 2022) ===
On 5 January 2022, in the amidst the civil unrest, Karin was appointed State Secretary of Kazakhstan. During an interview with Khabar 24, he publicly communicated the government's position on the unrest, characterizing it as a "hybrid terrorist attack" influenced by domestic and external factors.

Following his appointment as State Secretary, and subsequent changes to the office by President Toqaev, Karin's role was redefined on strategic domestic policy proposals and anti-corruption coordination, with several ceremonial functions reassigned, increasing his involvement in domestic politics and, according to analysts, strengthening his influence while building on his prior work as a presidential adviser on political reform.

During his tenure, he supported President Toqaev in advancing constitutional reforms following the 2022 unrest, publicly outlining the objectives of the proposed amendments . Karin described the Toqaev's reforms as part of the "New Kazakhstan" agenda and the transition toward a "Second Republic", stating that conducting the reform through a republican referendum would ensure its legitimacy and national character.

=== State Counsellor of Kazakhstan (2022–2026) ===
On 14 June 2022, the office of State Secretary was abolished and reorganized into the post of State Counsellor of Kazakhstan by President Tokayev's decree, to which Karin was appointed. On the same day, he was appointed deputy chairman of the National Kurultai.[3] In the newly formed role, he assumed responsibility for strategic domestic policy, coordination of key commissions, and oversight of social, humanitarian, and analytical initiatives under the president.

During his tenure, Karin was involved in implementing presidential initiatives in education, science and culture, as well as children and youth policy, national values and digitalization. In 2023, he announced a plan to implement presidential initiatives following the National Kurultai, including measures concerning education, rural schools, literature, publishing and historical research. He also served as chairman of Kazakhstan's National Commission for UNESCO and ICESCO, overseeing cooperation with the organizations in the fields of education, science, culture and heritage, and representing Kazakhstan in international forums.

Karin subsequently played a prominent role in the political reform process. On 8 October 2025, he was appointed head of the Working Group on Parliamentary Reform, which developed proposals for the transition from a bicameral Parliament to a unicameral legislature. On 21 January 2026, he was appointed deputy chairman of the Constitutional Commission, which developed the draft of a new constitution.

Karin also served as chairman of the State Commission for the Full Rehabilitation of Victims of Political Repression from 2020 to 2023 and as chairman of the editorial board responsible for preparing the multi-volume academic edition History of Kazakhstan from Ancient Times to the Present.

=== First Deputy Aqorda Chief of Staff (June–August 2026) ===
On 30 June 2026, following the abolition of the office of State Counsellor under the new constitution, Karin was appointed First Deputy Head of the Presidential Administration, replacing his previous position. His appointment came one day before the new constitution entered into force, as the presidential administration was reorganized alongside the transition to the new constitutional system. During his brief tenure, he continued to participate in constitutional and political matters, including commenting on the Constitutional Court's interpretation of Tokayev's eligibility for another presidential term in July 2026.

While serving as first deputy head of the presidential administration, Karin joined the Ädilet party and was subsequently included on its party list for the 2026 legislative election to the Kurultai. Speaking following the party's 3rd Extraordinary Congress on 11 July 2026, he described his inclusion on the list as both an honour and a responsibility. Following the election, Karin stated that whether he would become a deputy of the Kurultai would depend on the distribution of mandates and the subsequent decision of the party. However, he ultimately did not receive a mandate in the Kurultai.

== Vice President of Kazakhstan (2026–present) ==
On 31 August 2026, Tokayev nominated Karin for the newly established office of Vice President of Kazakhstan, describing him as an experienced statesman who had contributed to the implementation of major reforms and possessed a long-term vision for the country's development. The Kurultai approved his candidacy with 141 out of 145 deputies. Following his appointment, Karin pledged to uphold constitutional values and serve the country, while Tokayev instructed him to represent the president's position in cooperation with the Kurultai, the government and other state bodies on key issues of state policy. On 5 September, Tokayev signed a decree defining the powers of the vice president, which included developing strategic policy initiatives, representing the president before state bodies and international organizations, and overseeing several presidential commissions and institutions.

In September 2026, Karin began overseeing aspects of domestic policy and ideological work, including constitutional values, public ethics, social cohesion and the implementation of presidential initiatives. He chaired meetings of the Ideological Council and other policy meetings and identified constitutional values, a new public ethic, and future-oriented development through education, science, innovation, culture and human capital as priorities for domestic policy.

== Personal life ==
Karin speaks Kazakh, Russian and English. He names Älikhan Bökeykhan, John F. Kennedy and Nursultan Nazarbaev as ideal political figures. He is married and has six children.

== Awards ==
- Order of Kurmet (2010)
- Order of Dostyk, 2nd class (2019)
- Order of Barys, 2nd class (2022)
- Order of Dustlik (Uzbekistan) (2024)
- Order of Barys, 1st class (2025), for his significant contribution to the socio-economic and cultural and spiritual development of Kazakhstan, strengthening friendship and cooperation between peoples, active public service, and on the occasion of Republic Day
- Order of Otan (2026)

== Bibliography ==
Written works

- Karin, Erlan (2013). Балбалтас. От Орхона до Каспия [Balbaltas: From the Orkhon to the Caspian] (in Russian). Almaty.
- Karin, Erlan (2014). Successor or Succession? Transferring Power in Kazakhstan. Almaty: Kazakhstan Institute for Strategic Studies.
- Karin, Erlan (2014). Солдаты Халифата: Мифы и реальность [Soldiers of the Caliphate: Myths and Reality] (in Russian). Almaty: Vlast Publishing House. ISBN 978-601-80507-0-1.
- Karin, Erlan; Zenn, Jacob (July 2017). Между ИГИЛ и Аль-Каидой: центральноазиатские боевики в Сирийской войне [Between ISIS and Al-Qaeda: Central Asian Fighters in the Syrian War] (in Russian). Astana. ISBN 978-601-7922-00-9.
- Karin, Erlan (7 August 2020). Операция «Жусан». Кого и почему вернули из Сирии? [Operation Zhusan: Who Was Returned from Syria and Why?] (in Russian). Almaty: Print House Gerona. ISBN 978-601-7847-42-5.
- Ksenzhik, Galina; Karin, Erlan (2023). Сводный каталог картографических материалов по истории Казахстана XVII — начала XX вв. [Consolidated Catalogue of Cartographic Materials on the History of Kazakhstan] (in Russian). Almaty: National Museum of the Republic of Kazakhstan. ISBN 978-601-269-145-0.
- Karin, Erlan (2024). От Cassackia до Казахстана [From Cassackia to Kazakhstan] (in Russian). Almaty: National Museum of the Republic of Kazakhstan. ISBN 978-601-217-854-8.

Thesis

- Karin, Erlan (1999). Внутриполитические аспекты национальной безопасности Казахстана [Internal Political Aspects of the National Security of Kazakhstan] (Candidate of Political Sciences thesis thesis) (in Russian). Almaty: Al-Farabi Kazakh National University.

External links

- Karin, Erlan (20 August 2023). "Formation of Kazakhstan's national identity as foundation for the prosperity of the country". Modern Diplomacy.
