= State Counsellor of Kazakhstan =

Government post in Kazakhstan

State Counsellor of the Republic of Kazakhstan
- Қазақстан Республикасының Мемлекеттік кеңесшісі

- Last served Erlan Karin; 5 January 2022 – 30 June 2026
- Status: Abolished
- Residence: Astana, Kazakhstan
- Appointer: President
- Inaugural holder: Akhmetzhan Esimov
- Formation: 12 March 1996
- Abolished: 30 June 2026
- Website: akorda.kz

The State Counsellor of the Republic of Kazakhstan (Kazakh: Қазақстан Республикасының Мемлекеттік кеңесшісі, romanized: Qazaqstan Respublikasynyñ Memlekettık keñesşısı), formerly the State Secretary of Kazakhstan (Kazakh: Қазақстан Республикасының Мемлекеттік хатшысы, romanized: Qazaqstan Respublikasynyñ Memlekettık hatşysy), was an appointed post under the direct supervision of the president of Kazakhstan.

The state counsellor would develop proposals for the president on domestic and foreign policy and coordinates activities on social and cultural issues.

== List of state secretaries ==
No.	Image	State Secretary	Term of office		President
1.		Akhmetzhan Yessimov	4 March 1996	24 October 1996	Nursultan Nazarbayev
2.		Abish Kekilbayev	30 October 1996	29 January 2002	Nursultan Nazarbayev
3.		Kassym-Jomart Tokayev	29 January 2002	13 June 2003	Nursultan Nazarbayev
4.		Imangali Tasmagambetov	13 June 2003	9 March 2004	Nursultan Nazarbayev
5.		Oralbay Abdykarimov	10 March 2004	15 May 2007	Nursultan Nazarbayev
6.		Kanat Saudabayev	15 May 2007	23 January 2012	Nursultan Nazarbayev
7.		Mukhtar Kul-Mukhammed	23 January 2012	16 January 2013	Nursultan Nazarbayev
8.		Marat Tazhin	16 January 2013	21 January 2014	Nursultan Nazarbayev
Acting		Karim Massimov	21 January 2014	2 April 2014	Nursultan Nazarbayev
9.		Adilbek Zhakysbekov	2 April 2014	22 October 2014	Nursultan Nazarbayev
10.		Nurlan Nigmatullin	22 October 2014	11 November 2014	Nursultan Nazarbayev
11.		Gulshara Abdykhalikova	11 November 2014	25 February 2019	Nursultan Nazarbayev
12.		Bakhytzhan Sagintayev	1 March 2019	24 March 2019	Nursultan Nazarbayev
12.		Bakhytzhan Sagintayev	1 March 2019	24 March 2019	Kassym-Jomart Tokayev
13.		Marat Tazhin	24 March 2019	18 September 2019	Kassym-Jomart Tokayev
14.		Krymbek Kusherbayev	18 September 2019	12 January 2022	Kassym-Jomart Tokayev
15.		Erlan Karin	5 January 2022	30 June 2026	Kassym-Jomart Tokayev
