= Gulshara Abdykhalikova =

Kazakh politician (born 1965)

MP Gülşara Äbdıqalyqova
- Гүлшара Әбдіқалықова
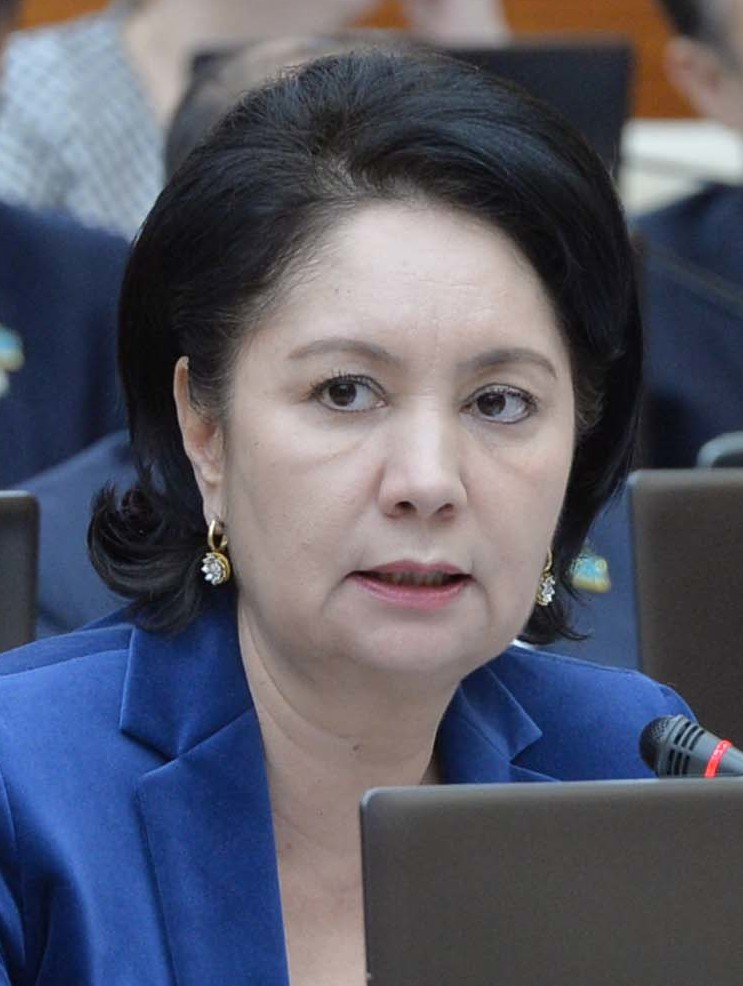
- Äbdıqalyqova in 2019

State Secretary of Kazakhstan
- In office 11 November 2014 – 25 February 2019
- President: Nursultan Nazarbayev
- Preceded by: Adilbek Zhaksybekov
- Succeeded by: Bakhytzhan Sagintayev

Deputy Prime Minister of Kazakhstan
- In office 25 February 2019 – 20 August 2019
- Prime Minister: Askar Mamin
- In office 28 November 2013 – 11 November 2014
- President: Nursultan Nazarbayev
- Prime Minister: Serik Akhmetov; Karim Massimov

Minister of Labour and Social Protection of the Population
- In office 4 March 2009 – 24 September 2012
- President: Nursultan Nazarbayev
- Prime Minister: Karim Massimov
- Preceded by: Berdibek Saparbayev
- Succeeded by: Serik Abdenov

Member of the Mazhilis
- In office 20 August 2019 – 27 March 2020

Äkim of Kyzylorda Region
- In office 28 March 2020 – 7 April 2022
- Preceded by: Kuanyshbek Iskakov
- Succeeded by: Nurlybek Nalibaev

Personal details
- Born: 15 May 1965 (age 61) Solo Tyube, Kazakh SSR, Soviet Union
- Party: Nur Otan
- Education: Dzhambul Technology Institute of Light Industry and Food Processing

Gülşara Nauşaqyzy Äbdıqalyqova (Note: Often transliterated as Gulshara Naushayevna Abdykhalikova through a Russified Romanization of Гульшара Наушаевна Абдыхаликова.) (Kazakh: Гүлшара Наушақызы Әбдіқалықова; born 15 May 1965) is a Kazakh politician who is currently an akim of Kyzylorda Region since 28 March 2020. Prior to that, she served as the member of the Mazhilis from 16 August 2019 to 27 March 2020, Deputy Prime Minister of Kazakhstan twice from 25 February 2019 to 20 August 2019 and from 28 November 2013 to 11 November 2014. She was also the State Secretary of Kazakhstan from 11 November 2014 to 25 February 2019 and a Minister of Labour and Social Protection of the Population from 4 March 2009 to 24 September 2012.

== Biography ==
=== Early life and education ===
Äbdıqalyqova was born in the village of Solo Tyube. In 1987, she graduated from the Jambyl Technological Institute of the Light and Food Industry, majoring in economics.

In 2005, Äbdıqalyqova earned her candidacy of economic sciences on her dissertation topic "Capitalization of pension funds: problems and prospects (examples of NPFs of the Republic of Kazakhstan)".

=== Career ===
From 1987, she worked as a senior inspector, head of the Kyzylorda Regional Department of Social Protection of the Population. In 1994, Äbdıqalyqova became a consultant to the Committee of the Supreme Soviet of Kazakhstan.

After its dissolution in 1995, she worked at the Ministry of Labour and Social Protection of the Population as the head of department, deputy head of department, head of Pension Management, deputy director of the Department of Social Security, director of the Department of Social Security and Social Assistance, director of the Department of Pension Provision and Income Regulation Population.

In March 2003, Äbdıqalyqova became a Vice Minister of Labour and Social Protection of the Population. She served that position until being appointed as the chair of the Board of JSC Life Insurance Company in December 2005. She was reappointed again as the Vice Minister in October 2006. From October 2007 to January 2008, Äbdıqalyqova served as the Executive Secretary of the Ministry. In January 2008, she was appointed as an adviser to the President of Kazakhstan and the chair of the National Commission for Women and Family and Demographic Policy under the President.

On 4 March 2009, Äbdıqalyqova became the Minister of Labour and Social Protection of the Population until becoming the advisor to the President again in September 2012.

On 28 November 2013, Äbdıqalyqova was appointed as the Deputy Prime Minister of Kazakhstan. She served that position until becoming the State Secretary of Kazakhstan on 11 November 2014. From 25 February to 20 August 2019, Äbdıqalyqova again served as the Deputy Prime Minister before being relieved from her post and becoming a member of the Mazhilis. From there, she was elected as the chair of the Chamber Committee on Socio-Cultural Development on 4 September 2019.

From March 28, 2020, to April 7, 2022, Äbdıqalyqova was the akim of Kyzylorda Region, which made her the first woman in Kazakhstan to hold such a position.

Since June 6, 2022, Gülşara Äbdıqalyqova has been a business partner in human resource management of JSC NC KazMunayGas.
