= Marat Tajin =

Kazakh politician (born 1960)

Marat Täzhin
- Марат Тәжин
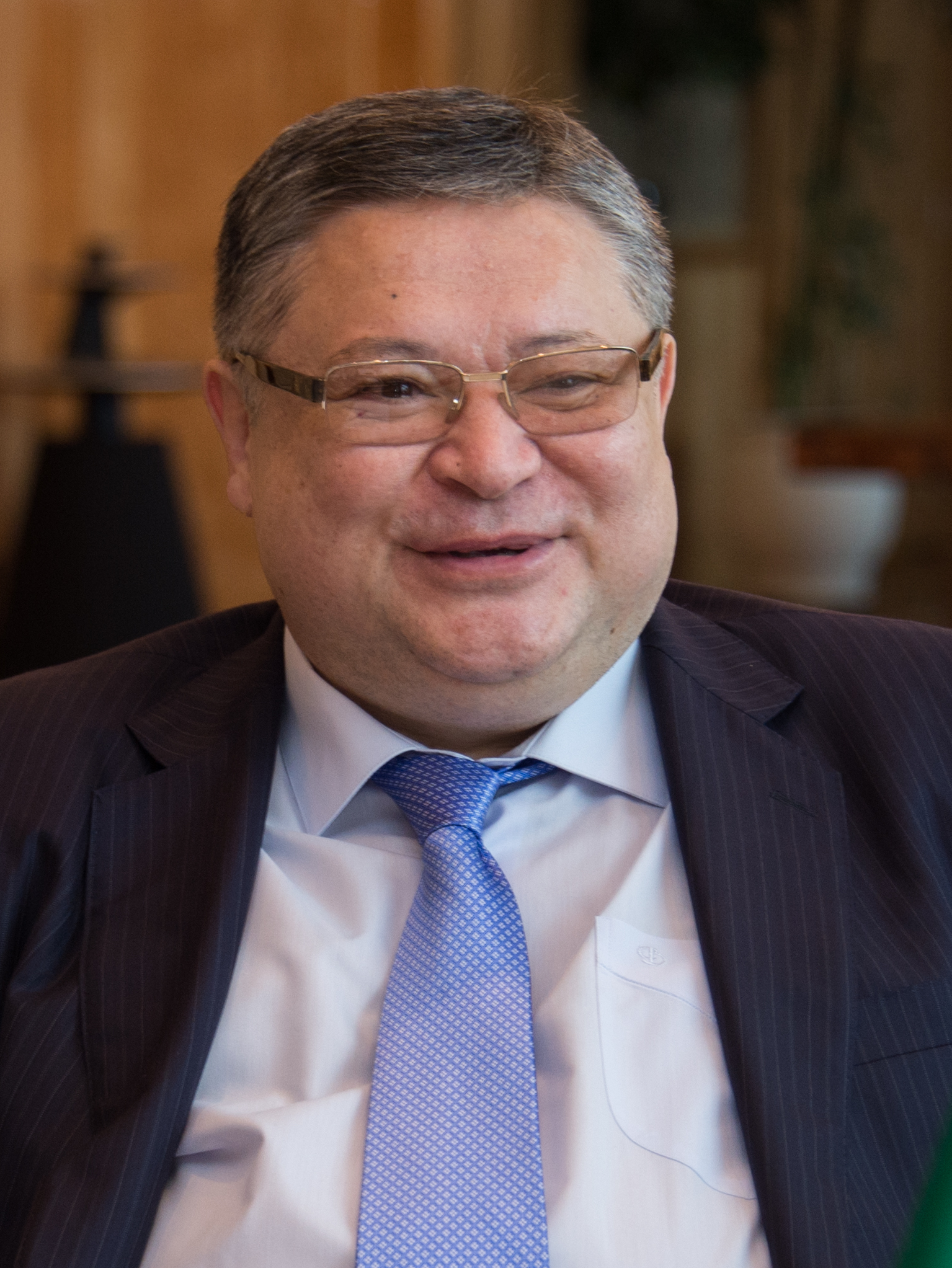
- Täzhin in 2015

State Secretary of Kazakhstan
- In office 24 March 2019 – 18 September 2019
- President: Qasym-Zhomart Toqaev
- Preceded by: Baqytzhan Saghyntaev
- Succeeded by: Qyrymbek Kösherbaev
- In office 16 January 2013 – 21 January 2014
- President: Nursultan Nazarbaev
- Preceded by: Mukhtar Qul-Mukhammed
- Succeeded by: Kärim Mäsimov (Acting)

First Deputy Head of the Presidential Administration of Kazakhstan
- In office 29 August 2002 – 13 April 2006
- President: Nursultan Nazarbaev
- Preceded by: Office established
- Succeeded by: Office abolished
- In office 12 January 2017 – 24 March 2019
- President: Nursultan Nazarbaev; Qasym-Zhomart Toqaev
- Preceded by: Office reestablished
- Succeeded by: Darkhan Kaletaev

Minister of Foreign Affairs
- In office 10 January 2007 – 4 September 2009
- President: Nursultan Nazarbaev
- Prime Minister: Kärim Mäsimov
- Preceded by: Qasym-Zhomart Toqaev
- Succeeded by: Qanat Sawdabaev

Secretary of the Security Council
- In office 24 February 1999 – 5 May 2001
- President: Nursultan Nazarbaev
- Preceded by: Beksultan Särsekov
- Succeeded by: Altynbek Särsenbaiuly
- In office 11 December 2001 – 29 August 2002
- President: Nursultan Nazarbaev
- Preceded by: Altynbek Särsenbaiuly
- Succeeded by: Omarkhan Öksikbaev
- In office April 2006 – January 2007
- President: Nursultan Nazarbaev
- Preceded by: Bolat Ötemuratov
- Succeeded by: Berik Imashev
- In office September 2009 – January 2013
- Preceded by: Qaiyrbek Süleimenov
- Succeeded by: Qairat Qozhamzharov

Chairman of the National Security Committee
- In office 4 May 2001 – 11 December 2001
- Preceded by: Älnur Musaev
- Succeeded by: Nartai Dütbaev

Personal details
- Born: 8 April 1960 (age 66) Aqtöbe, Kazakhstan, Soviet Union
- Party: Justice
- Education: Almaty National Economic Institute; Kazakh State University

Marat Mukhanbetqazyuly Täzhin (Note: Often transliterated as Marat Mukhanbetkaziyevich Tazhin through a Russified Romanization of Марат Муханбетказиевич Тажин.) (Kazakh: Марат Мұханбетқазыұлы Тәжин, romanized: Marat Mūhanbetqazyūly Täjin; born 8 April 1960) is a Kazakh politician. He served as the Foreign Minister in the Government of Kazakhstan from 2007 to 2009. He previously served as Secretary of the National Security Committee (NSC). In September 2009 he was named an advisor to President Nursultan Nazarbaev and secretary of Kazakhstan's Security Council. Marat Täzhin was appointed First Deputy Head of the Executive Office of the President of the Republic of Kazakhstan in January 2017.

== Education and early career ==
He graduated from the Almaty National Economic Institute and continued his post-graduate study at Kazakh State University, eventually becoming a senior lecturer there. From 1987 to 1988 he interned in London, United Kingdom. From 1991 to 1992 he served as a department head at Al-Farabi University in Almaty.

== Political career ==
Täzhin began his service as chairman of the NSC in May 2001, succeeding Älnur Musaev. He was replaced shortly thereafter in December 2001 by Nartai Dütbaev.

Täzhin replaced Qasym-Zhomart Toqaev as foreign minister on 10 January 2007 during a government shake-up. Toqaev became the Chairman of the Senate.

Täzhin assisted President Nursultan Nazarbaev in writing several books.

Täzhin met with United States Senator Richard Lugar in Astana on 7 February 2006 to discuss biological weapon nonproliferation measures and cooperation with U.S. scientists.

He has received the Order of Qurmet.

January 2013 Marat Täzhin was relieved of his duties as Aide to the President and Security Council Secretary and appointed Kazakhstan's Secretary of State, replacing outgoing Mukhtar Qul-Mukhammed.

February 2014 Marat Täzhin was appointed Ambassador Extraordinary and Plenipotentiary of the Republic of Kazakhstan to the Russian Federation.

January 2017 Marat Täzhin was appointed First Deputy Head of the Executive Office of the President of the Republic of Kazakhstan.

== Perception ==
Analysts have described him as a theoretician and as a shadow who prefers to wield power behind the scene. President Nazarbaev described him after appointing him foreign minister as a "scholar, a Ph.D., and has been my adviser, including on foreign policy questions. Since the international community attaches great importance to my choice for foreign minister, I appointed the person I know well and believe in. Most importantly, I believe he will succeed in his new job and will bring his contribution to further foreign policy successes of our country.”

== Notes ==
Political offices
Preceded by Qasym-Zhomart Toqaev	Foreign Minister of Kazakhstan	Succeeded by Qanat Sawdabaev
