= People's Kurultai of Kyrgyzstan =

People's Kurultai of Kyrgyzstan Кыргызстан Элдик курултайы (Kyrgyz)

Type
- Type: Advisory, supervisory, public representative assembly

History
- Founded: 2022

Leadership
- Chairman: Myktybek Abdyldayev, Bir Bol

Meeting place
- Bishkek

Website
- www.kenesh.kg

People's Kurultai of Kyrgyzstan (Kyrgyz: Кыргызстан Элдик курултайы, Russian: Народный Курултай Кыргызстана) is a Kurultai, an advisory, supervisory, public-representative assembly that makes recommendations on the directions of social development, the solution of important issues of the socio-economic development of society and the state, the protection of the rights and freedoms of citizens, the development of civil society and spiritual-ideological issues, designed to solve the problems of unification, ethnocultural development and renewal of the Kyrgyz Republic, has the right of legislative initiative.

== History ==
The tradition of the Kyrgyz to gather kurultai for self-government, discuss the most important issues and solve pressing problems has its roots in the distant past. It is known that kurultais were held in ancient times, when the most important issues were decided.

On August 29–31, 1992, the first World Kurultai of the Kyrgyz was held in Bishkek, which determined the strategy for the national development of the Kyrgyz people. Delegates of the Kyrgyz people from almost all continents of the world participated in the kurultai: China (Kanat Abdubakir), Turkey (Arip, Rakhmankul, Toktosun azhy Sydyk uulu), Saudi Arabia (Amit azhy Myrzakhmat uulu, Abdurakhim Abdrakhman), Afghanistan, Tajikistan, Uzbekistan, the USA (Sydyk Aldash), Nigeria (Kemelbaev Nurgazy), Australia (Aziz Abdukar), France (Ozhurova Tursun) and others.

The First Kurultai of the Peoples of Kyrgyzstan was an official meeting held on January 21–22, 1994, in Bishkek. It was attended by representatives of 24 national and cultural centers established in Kyrgyzstan and foreign guests. The Kurultai discussed issues of the future development of Kyrgyzstan and its goals. More than 40 representatives of the peoples of Kyrgyzstan, Kazakhstan (A. Nurpeisov), the USA (Senator H. Hemprey) and others. Guests from several countries spoke and called on the multinational people of the republic to unity and harmony. The issues of the development of the state language and its future were also discussed. It was noted that the basis for studying the Kyrgyz language had not yet been created. On behalf of the Kurultai, before the slogan “Kyrgyzstan is our common home,” an appeal was made to all the peoples living in Kyrgyzstan and a declaration was adopted calling for national unity, interethnic peace and harmony. The Assembly of the People of Kyrgyzstan was created at the Kurultai.

=== First People's Kurultai ===
The 1st People's Kurultai of Kyrgyzstan was held on November 25-26, 2022, at the Toktogul Satylganov Philharmonic in Bishkek. The kurultai was attended by 1,074 delegates, 1,036 from rural districts and cities (two from each of the 452 rural districts and 12 cities of regional significance and one from each of the 18 cities of district significance), 60 from the city of Bishkek, 30 from the city of Osh, 28 from labour migrants abroad, and 10 from religious communities. The First People's Kurultai was opened by the chairman of the organizing committee for holding the Kurultai, State Secretary of Kyrgyzstan Suyunbek Kasmambetov. Kadyr Koshaliev was elected chairman of the council of elders at the Kurultai. The final resolution noted the principles of development of Kyrgyzstan, strengthening interethnic and interfaith relations, improving laws and others. Following the People's Kurultai, a resolution was adopted by open vote, which was sent to government agencies and local governments as recommendations.

=== Second People's Kurultai ===
The II People's Kurultai of Kyrgyzstan was held on December 15-16, 2023 in Bishkek. The Kurultai was attended by 700 delegates, 550 from rural districts and cities, 60 from Bishkek, 30 from Osh, 30 from labor migrants abroad, and 30 from ethnic groups. Of these, 143 were women and 551 were men. The Second People's Kurultai was opened by the chairman of the organizing committee for holding the Kurultai, State Secretary of Kyrgyzstan Suyunbek Kasmambetov. Myktybek Abdyldayev was elected chairman of the national council at the Kurultai.

== See also ==
- Great Kurultáj
- National Kurultai
- People's Council of Turkmenistan
