= National Kurultai =

Advisory body in Kazakhstan

National Kurultai under the President of Kazakhstan
- Қазақстан Президентінің жанындағы Ұлттық құрылтай (Kazakh); Национальный курултай при Президенте Казахстана (Russian)
- Predecessor: National Council of Public Trust
- Formation: 14 June 2022
- Founder: Kassym-Jomart Tokayev
- Dissolved: 1 July 2026
- Type: Advisory and consultative state body
- Purpose: Fostering national unity, civic dialogue, public participation in governance
- Members: 117
- Chairman: Kassym-Jomart Tokayev (only)

The National Kurultai under the President of the Republic of Kazakhstan, (Note: Kazakh: Қазақстан Республикасы Президентінің жанындағы Ұлттық құрылтай; Qazaqstan Respublikasy Prezidentınıñ janyndağy Ūlttyq qūryltai; Russian: Национальный курултай при Президенте Республики Казахстан; Natsionalny kurultai pri Prezidente Respubliki Kazakhstan) or simply the National Kurultai, (Note: Kazakh: Ұлттық құрылтай, romanized: Ūlttyq qūryltai, lit. 'National Congress'; Russian: Национальный курултай, romanized: Natsionalny kurultai) was an advisory and consultative state body in Kazakhstan. Established in 2022 by President Kassym-Jomart Tokayev, it served as a platform for dialogue between the government and civil society. It was convened annually in different historically significant regions of the country. The body was dissolved in July 2026 following the adoption of a new Constitution after the 2026 referendum.

== History ==
The term kurultai (from Turkic qurultay, meaning "gathering" or "assembly") has its roots in the political traditions of Turkic and Mongol nomadic societies, where it referred to councils convened by tribal leaders or khans to make collective decisions.

The modern National Kurultai was established on 14 June 2022 by decree of President Kassym-Jomart Tokayev, following the constitutional referendum. It replaced the National Council of Public Trust, which previously served as consultative body to encourage public participation in governance. According to deputy chairman of the National Kurultai, Erlan Qarin, the organisation serves as a consultative and advisory body under the President of Kazakhstan. Its primary objective is to facilitate national dialogue and develop strategies that promote public unity, strengthen civic engagement, and ensure social cohesion.

=== Sessions ===
The inaugural meeting of the National Kurultai was held in the Ulytau Region on 16 June 2022. President Kassym-Jomart Tokayev emphasised the importance of strengthening national solidarity and enhancing public participation in state affairs. The session addressed a broad agenda, resulting in legislative initiatives on women's and children's rights, measures to prevent gambling and drug addiction, and the reinstatement of Republic Day as a national holiday.

The second session convened in Turkistan on 17 June 2023 under the theme "Just Kazakhstan — Responsible Citizen", with discussions centered on ethics, cultural identity, and civic responsibility. Participants examined the preservation of national traditions while adapting to modern conditions. The meeting also addressed reforms in state symbols and support for creative industries, with the aim of strengthening a shared civic identity and promoting cultural innovation.

The third National Kurultai took place in Atyrau on 15 March 2024, with socio-economic development as its primary theme "Fair Citizen — Fair Labour — Fair Wages". President Tokayev and other speakers discussed strategies to address economic disparities between regions, while also highlighting the need to reduce excessive monument-building in favour of public infrastructure. The session responded to emerging social trends, advocating for balanced development policies and more efficient use of resources.

The fourth meeting was held in Burabay on 14 March 2025, focusing on regional development, tourism, environmental conservation, sports, education, and social justice. Key outcomes included directives to modernise infrastructure, expand the nation’s digital archives, and improve the delivery of public services. The discussions underscored the importance of integrating cultural heritage preservation with forward-looking socio-economic strategies.

=== Dissolution ===
Following the 2026 Kazakh constitutional referendum, the 2026 Constitution of Kazakhstan was adopted, and thus the National Kurultai was dissolved. The name "kurultai" was carried over to the country's new unicameral legislature, the Kurultai of Kazakhstan.

== Organisation and activities ==
The National Kurultai convened at least once a year, with sessions held in various regions. These gatherings served as platforms for discussing pressing national issues, formulating policy recommendations, promoting civic responsibility, addressing key areas such as economic reform, digitalisation, social policy, and national values through direct citizen engagement, and facilitating the adoption of legislation and constitutional amendments proposed by civil bodies or the President.

A meeting of the National Kurultai was considered competent if at least half of its members were present. Recommendations and proposals adopted at meetings were formalized in minutes signed by the Chairman. State bodies and public associations receiving these recommendations were required to consider them and notify the National Kurultai of measures taken, in accordance with Kazakh legislation. Key issues discussed and adopted recommendations were communicated to the public through media and online platforms.

Officials who are not members, as well as representatives of public organizations and the media, may be invited to attend meetings at the discretion of the Chairman.

The Ministry of Information and Social Development of the Republic of Kazakhstan serves as the working body of the National Kurultai. It is responsible for preparing draft agendas and programs for meetings, organizing materials and draft protocol recommendations, notifying members about meetings, providing information and analytical support, obtaining necessary documents from state bodies, monitoring the implementation of recommendations, and coordinating with the media. The Ministry also exercises other powers required to ensure the effective functioning of the National Kurultai.

== Structure ==
=== Composition ===
The National Kurultai comprised a range of individuals from various sectors of society, including government officials, representatives from public organizations, business leaders, intellectuals, and cultural figures, as a way to ensure broad representation of Kazakhstan's societal segments.

At the time of its founding, it consisted of 117 members, including deputies of the Mäjilis, members of the Assembly of People of Kazakhstan (APK), representatives of civil society and political parties, regional public council members, experts, and entrepreneurs.

=== Leadership ===
№	Portrait	Chairman	Term start	Term End	Deputy	Secretary
1		Kassym-Jomart Tokayev (born 1953)	14 June 2022	1 July 2026	Erlan Qarin	Aida Balaeva
1		Kassym-Jomart Tokayev (born 1953)	14 June 2022	1 July 2026	Bibigül Jeksenbai	Aida Balaeva

== See also ==
- Kurultai, term used to name the body
- Kurultai of Kazakhstan, the country's unicameral legislature since 2026
- People's Kurultai of Kyrgyzstan, Kyrgyz advisory body
