= Consulate General of Kazakhstan, San Francisco =

Coordinates: 37°47′37″N 122°24′10″W

Consulate General of the Republic of Kazakhstan in San Francisco Қазақстан Республикасының Сан-Франциско қаласындағы Бас консулдығы
- Location: San Francisco, California, United States
- Address: 456 Montgomery Street, Suite 950, San Francisco, CA 94104
- Opened: 3 January 2019; 7 years ago
- Inaugurated: 19 October 2019; 6 years ago
- Jurisdiction: California, Oregon, Washington, Nevada, Arizona, Utah, Idaho, Alaska, Hawaii
- Consul General: Nazira Nurbayeva
- Website: www.gov.kz/memleket/entities/mfa-san-francisko

The Consulate-General of the Republic of Kazakhstan in San Francisco (Kazakh: Қазақстан Республикасының Сан-Франциско қаласындағы Бас консулдығы; Russian: Генерального консульства Республики Казахстан в г. Сан-Франциско) is the diplomatic mission of Kazakhstan in the United States. Opened in 2019, the office is located at 456 Montgomery Street, Suite 950, San Francisco, California. The consulate represents Kazakhstan's interests on the West Coast, providing consular, legal, cultural, and informational assistance to Kazakh citizens and foreign nationals across its region.

== History ==
Kazakhstan first expanded its consular network in the United States with the opening of its mission in New York City in 2010. Further plans to strengthen diplomatic outreach developed in early 2018, when the government proposed establishing a second consulate on the West Coast to better serve citizens living in the western states. That same year, an additional 251.9 million tenge was allocated from the national budget to support the project, together with the transfer of several staff positions from the Ministry of Justice to the Ministry of Foreign Affairs.

On 4 June 2018, President Nursultan Nazarbayev signed Presidential Decree No. 697 "On the Opening of the Consulate-General of the Republic of Kazakhstan in San Francisco (United States of America)", formally authorizing the establishment of the Consulate-General in San Francisco. The initiative reflected Kazakhstan's growing cooperation with the Western United States, especially in technology, investment, and cultural exchange—areas where California plays a significant role.

The consulate began operating on 3 January 2019, initially focusing on essential consular services for Kazakh citizens and foreign visitors. A formal inauguration ceremony took place on 20 October 2019, marking Kazakhstan's first diplomatic mission on the West Coast and the first Central Asian consulate in this part of the United States.

== Jurisdiction ==
The Consulate-General in San Francisco provides services to residents of the following states:

- California
- Oregon
- Washington
- Nevada
- Arizona
- Utah
- Idaho
- Alaska
- Hawaii

Within this region, the mission handles passports, visas, legal and notarial services, and issues related to civil registration. It also works with local authorities and institutions on investment, business cooperation, education, and cultural initiatives.

== Activities ==
Since its establishment, the Consulate-General has been active in strengthening Kazakhstan's presence and visibility on the West Coast. It maintains close ties with the local Kazakh diaspora, Silicon Valley technology companies, universities, research centers, and cultural organizations throughout its jurisdiction.

The mission organizes a range of public events—cultural exhibitions, round tables, presentations, and donations of Kazakh books to American libraries and universities. It regularly participates in major city events, including national holiday celebrations. Among the most noted activities are the flag-raising ceremonies at San Francisco City Hall for Kazakhstan's Independence Day and Republic Day, during which Mayor London Breed has issued proclamations recognizing friendship and cooperation between Kazakhstan and the city.

The consulate also supports community festivals such as Nowruz and various Turkic cultural events, helping promote Kazakhstan's traditions and strengthen cultural ties across diverse communities.

== Location ==
The Consulate-General is located at 456 Montgomery Street, Suite 950, in San Francisco's Financial District, close to major transport links, business centers, and other diplomatic offices.

== See also ==
- List of diplomatic missions of Kazakhstan
- Embassy of Kazakhstan, Washington D.C.
- Consulate General of Kazakhstan, New York City
- Foreign relations of Kazakhstan
- Kazakhstan–United States relations
