= List of diplomatic missions in Kazakhstan =

This is a list of diplomatic missions in Kazakhstan. At present, the capital, Astana, hosts 72 embassies.

Excluded from this list are trade missions, tourism offices, and honorary consulates.

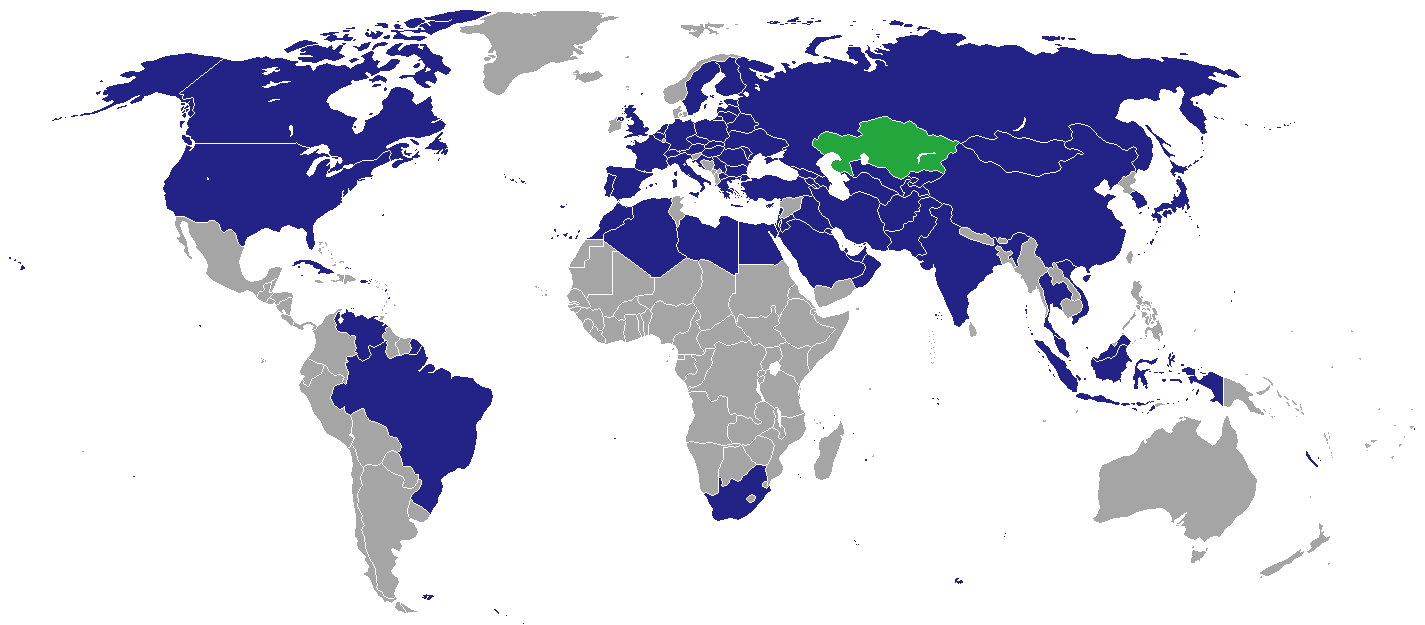
Map of diplomatic missions in Kazakhstan

== Diplomatic missions in Astana ==
=== Embassies ===
1. Afghanistan
2. Algeria
3. Armenia
4. Austria
5. Azerbaijan
6. Belarus
7. Belgium
8. Brazil
9. Bulgaria
10. Canada
11. China
12. Croatia
13. Cuba
14. Cyprus
15. Czechia
16. Egypt
17. Estonia
18. Finland
19. France
20. Georgia
21. Germany
22. Greece
23. Holy See
24. Hungary
25. India
26. Indonesia
27. Iran
28. Iraq
29. Israel
30. Italy
31. Japan
32. Jordan
33. Kuwait
34. Kyrgyzstan
35. Latvia
36. Lebanon
37. Libya
38. Lithuania
39. Malaysia
40. Moldova
41. Mongolia
42. Morocco
43. Netherlands
44. North Macedonia
45. Oman
46. Pakistan
47. Palestine
48. Poland
49. Portugal
50. Qatar
51. Romania
52. Russia
53. Saudi Arabia
54. Serbia
55. Slovakia
56. South Africa
57. South Korea
58. Sovereign Military Order of Malta
59. Spain
60. Sweden
61. Switzerland
62. Tajikistan
63. Thailand
64. Turkey
65. Turkmenistan
66. Ukraine
67. United Arab Emirates
68. United Kingdom
69. United States
70. Uzbekistan
71. Venezuela
72. Vietnam

=== Other Posts ===
- European Union (Delegation)
- Tatarstan (Plenipotentiary representation)

=== Gallery ===
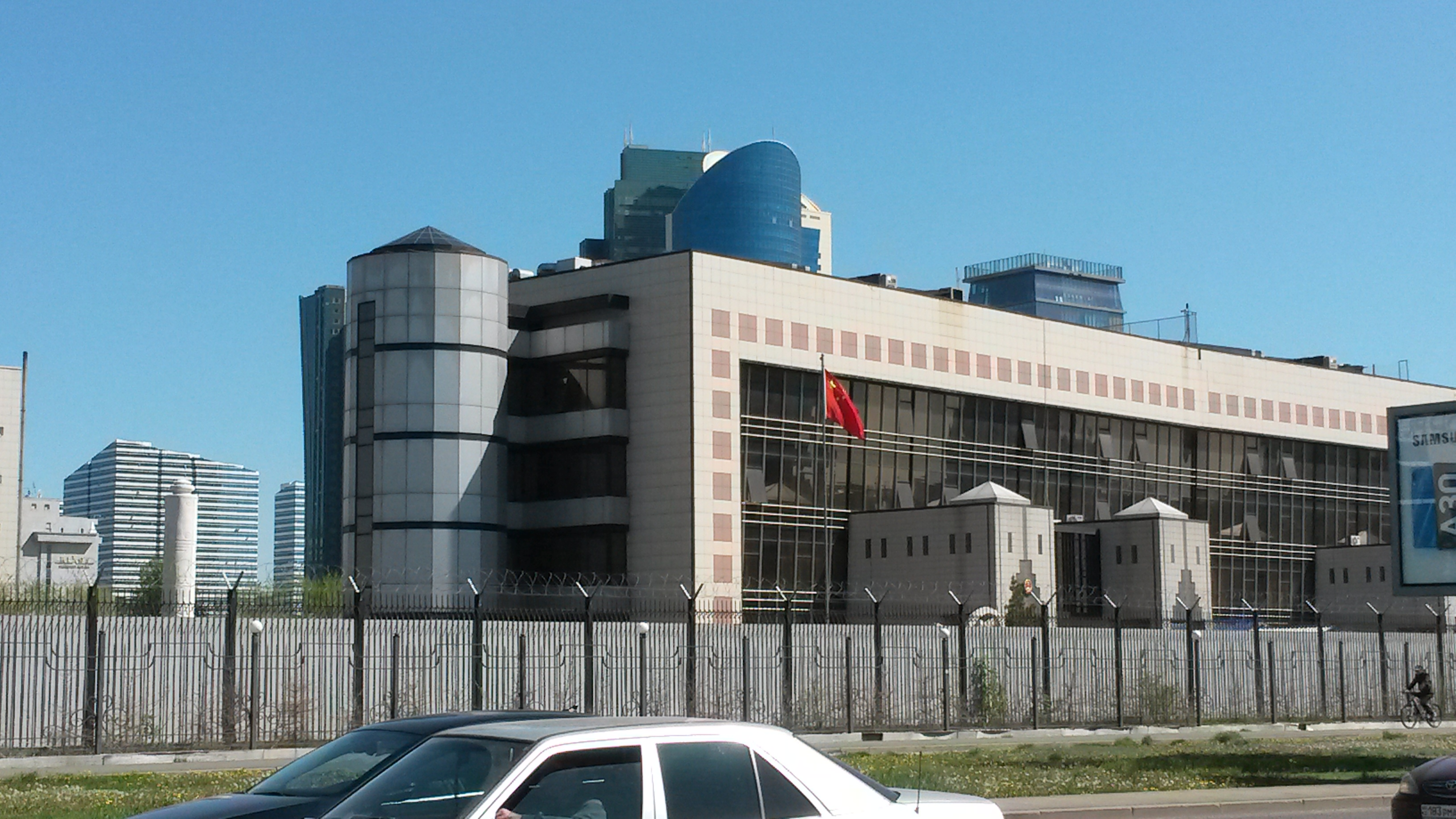
Embassy of China

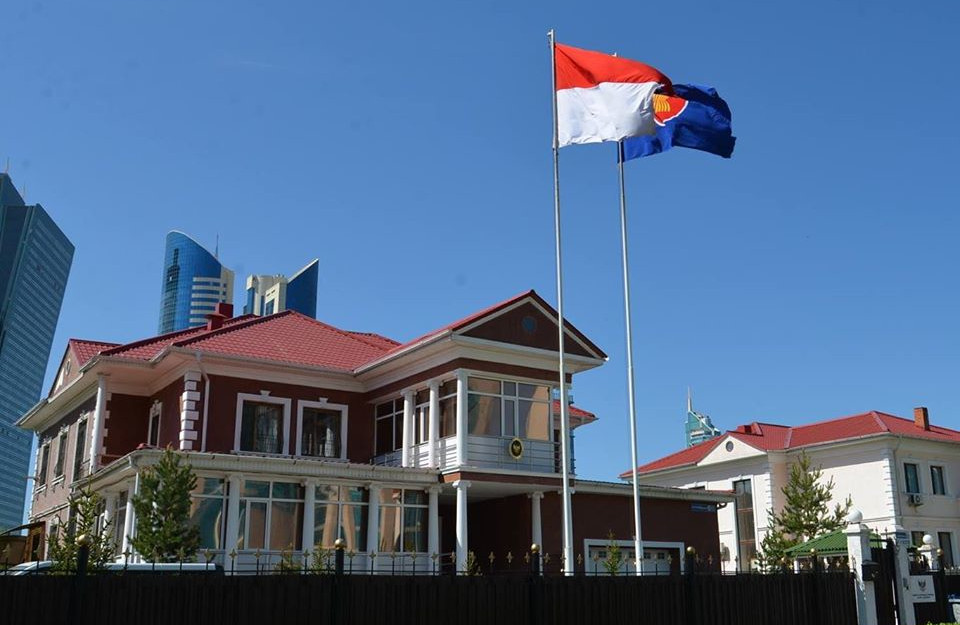
Embassy of Indonesia

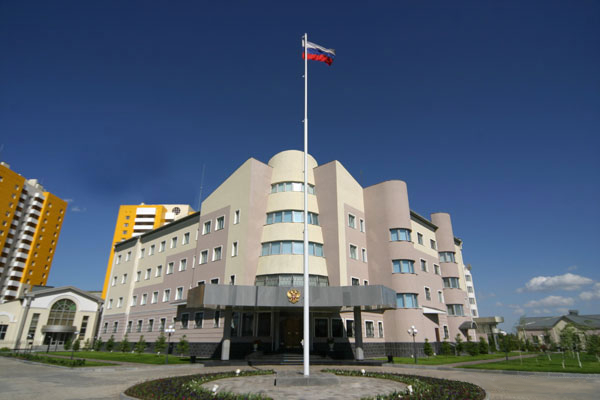
Embassy of Russia

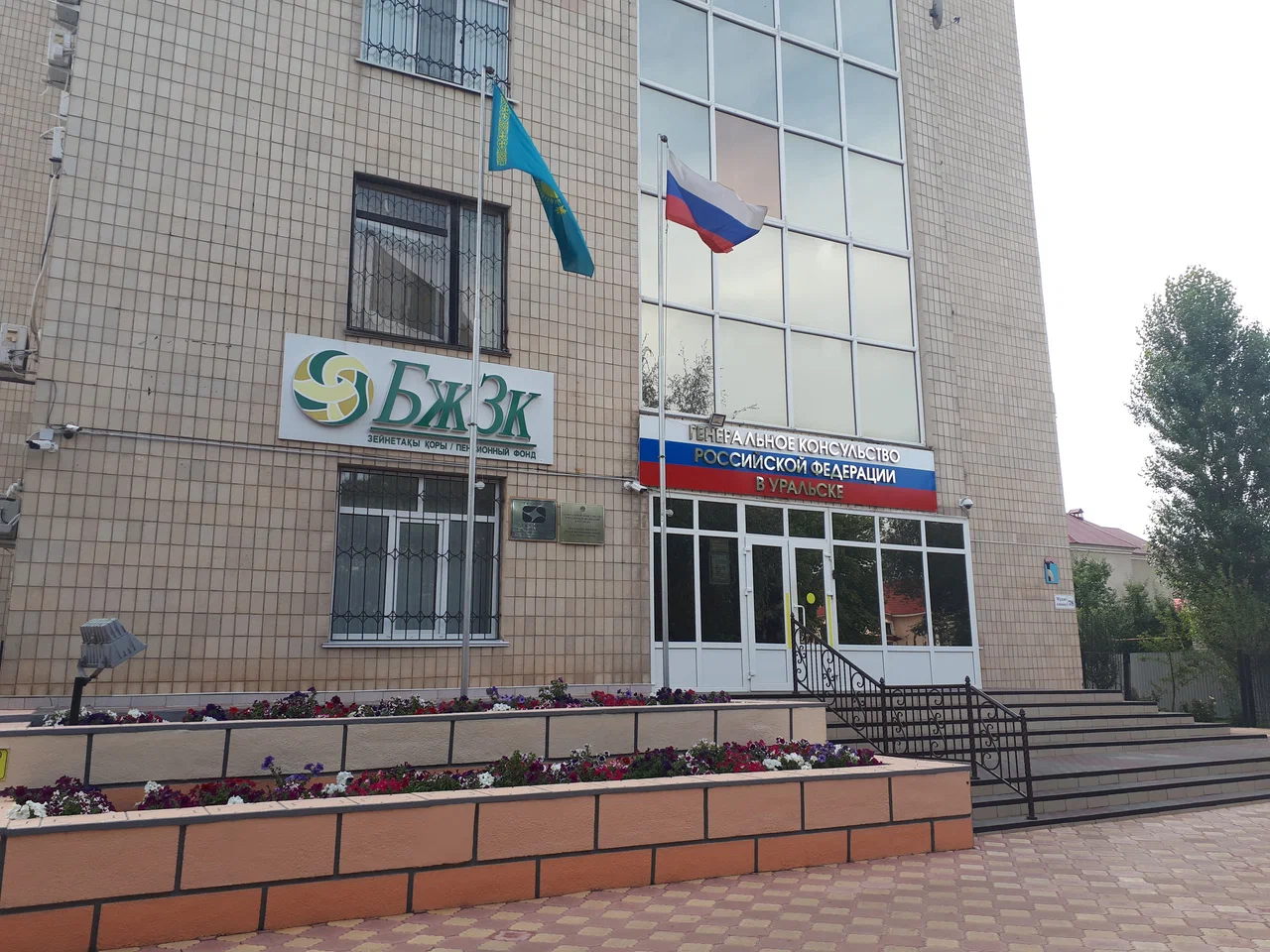
Consulate-General of Russia in Oral

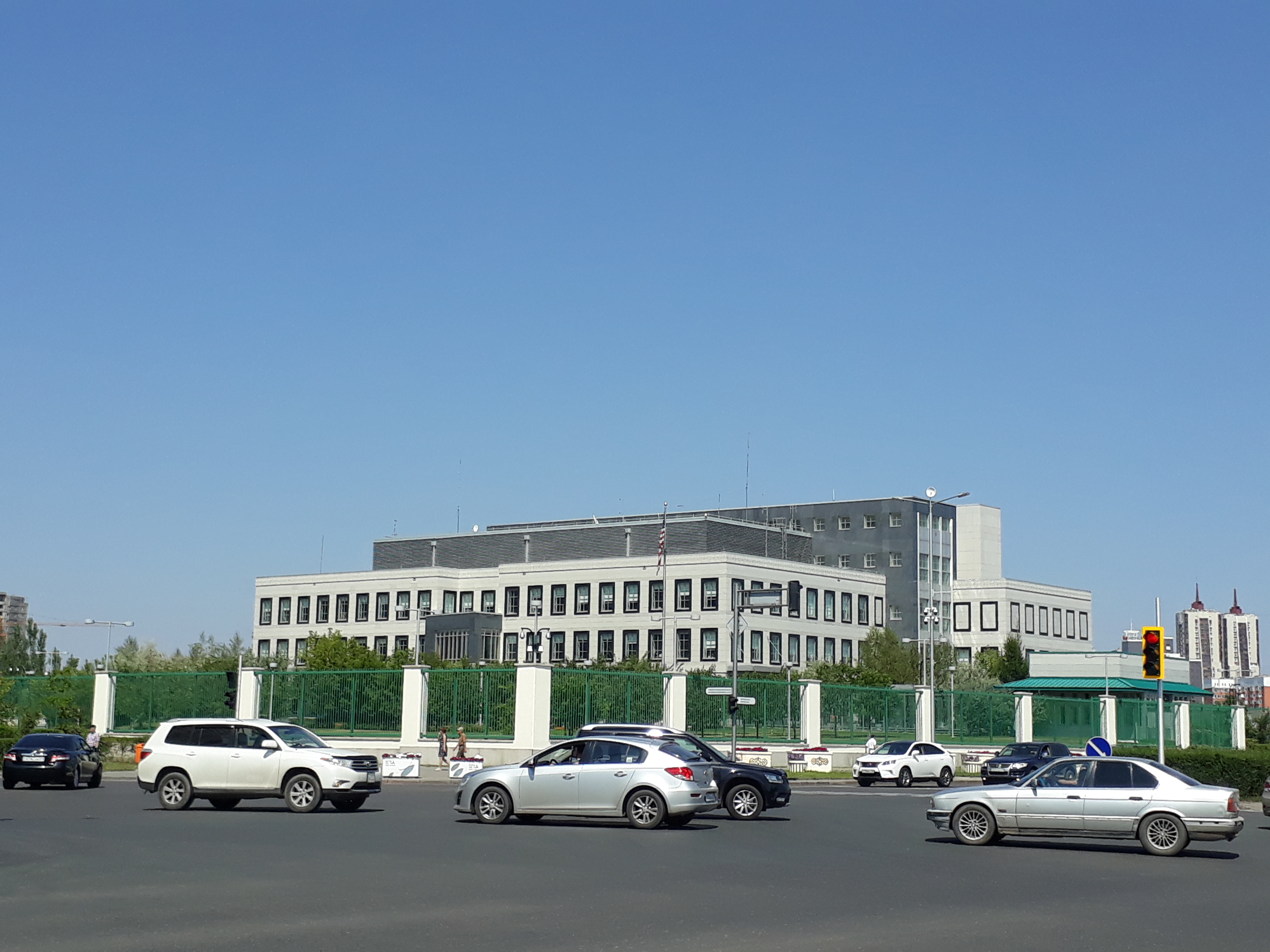
Embassy of the United States

== Consular missions ==
The following cities are host to career consular missions. All entries are consulates-general unless indicated otherwise.

=== Aktau, Mangystau Region ===
1. Azerbaijan
2. Iran
3. Russia
4. Turkey
5. Turkmenistan (Consulate)
6. Uzbekistan

=== Aktobe, Aktobe Region ===
1. China

=== Almaty ===
1. Afghanistan
2. Azerbaijan (Embassy office)
3. China
4. France
5. Germany
6. Hungary
7. India (Representative office)
8. Iran
9. Kyrgyzstan
10. Lithuania
11. Mongolia (Embassy office)
12. Poland
13. Russia
14. South Korea
15. Tajikistan
16. Turkey
17. Turkmenistan (Embassy office)
18. United States
19. Uzbekistan

=== Oral, West Kazakhstan Region ===
1. Russia

=== Oskemen, East Kazakhstan Region ===
1. Russia

=== Turkistan, Turkistan Region ===
1. Turkey

== Non-Resident Embassies ==
Resident in Moscow, Russia:

- Argentina
- Australia
- Bangladesh
- Bosnia and Herzegovina
- Bahrain
- Central African Republic
- Chile
- Costa Rica
- Colombia
- Denmark
- Guatemala
- Iceland
- Ireland
- Kenya
- Laos
- Luxembourg
- New Zealand
- Namibia
- Panama
- Peru
- Philippines
- Senegal
- Sierra Leone
- Slovenia
- Sri Lanka
- Syria
- Tanzania
- Tunisia
- Uganda
- Uruguay
- Zambia
- Zimbabwe

From Other Locations:

- Cambodia (Ankara)
- Ethiopia (Ankara)
- Lesotho (New Delhi)
- Maldives (Colombo)
- Malta (Valletta)
- Mexico (Ankara)
- Nigeria (Tehran)
- Rwanda (Ankara)
- Seychelles (Abu Dhabi)
- Singapore (Singapore)
- Somalia (Ankara)
- Togo (Berlin)
- Taiwan (Ankara)
- Tonga (Canberra)
- Yemen (Islamabad)

== Missions to open ==
Host city	Sending country	Mission	Ref.
Astana	Kenya	Consulate-General	
Astana	Philippines	Embassy	

== See also ==
- Foreign relations of Kazakhstan
- List of diplomatic missions of Kazakhstan
