= List of diplomatic missions of Kazakhstan =

This is a list of diplomatic missions of Kazakhstan, excluding honorary consulates. Kazakhstan is a landlocked Central Asian country.

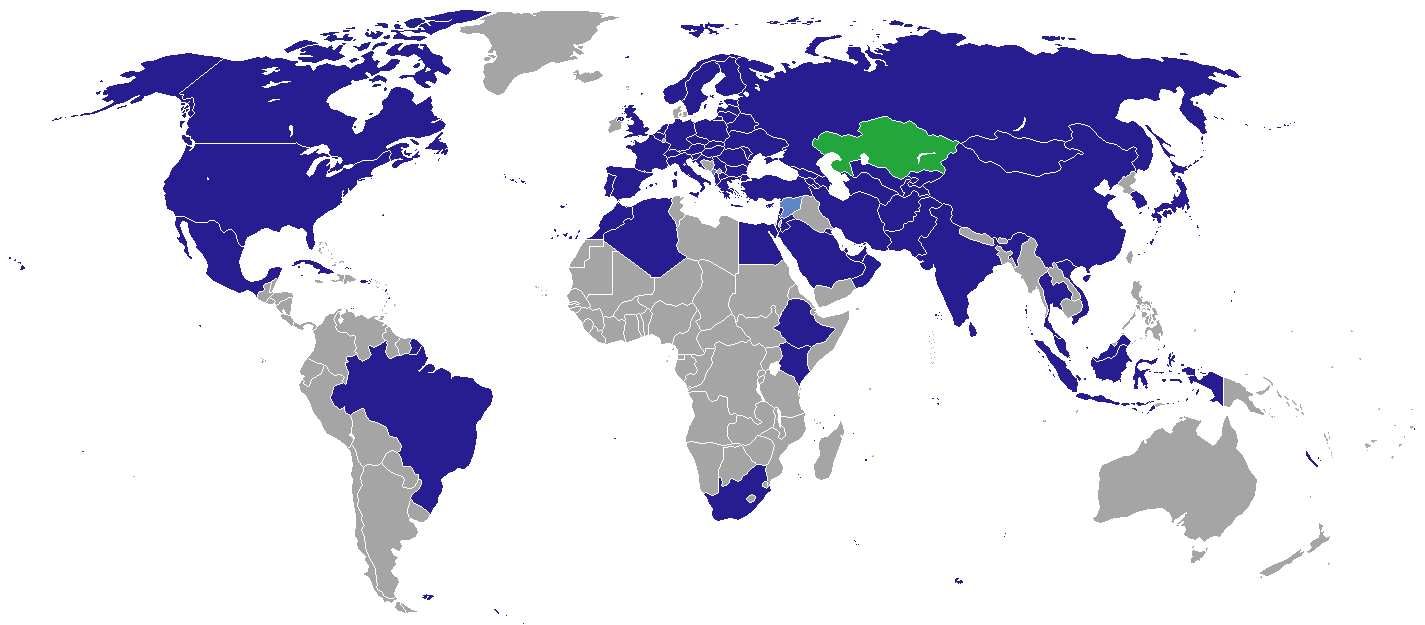
Diplomatic missions of Kazakhstan

== Current missions ==
=== Africa ===
Host country	Host city	Mission	Concurrent accreditation	Ref.
Algeria	Algiers	Embassy	Countries: Nigeria; Senegal; Tunisia	
Egypt	Cairo	Embassy	International Organizations: Arab League	
Ethiopia	Addis Ababa	Embassy	Countries: Comoros; Congo-Kinshasa; Djibouti; Eritrea; Ghana; Seychelles; Somalia; International Organizations: African Union; Intergovernmental Authority on Development; United Nations Economic Commission for Africa	
Kenya	Nairobi	Embassy	Countries: Rwanda; International Organizations: United Nations; United Nations Environment Programme; United Nations Human Settlements Programme	
Morocco	Rabat	Embassy	Countries: Benin; Burkina Faso; Cape Verde; Gabon; Gambia; Guinea-Bissau; Ivory Coast; Mali; Mauritania; Sierra Leone; Togo; International Organizations: Islamic World Educational, Scientific and Cultural Organization	
South Africa	Pretoria	Embassy	Countries: Mozambique; Tanzania	

=== Americas ===
Host country	Host city	Mission	Concurrent accreditation	Ref.
Brazil	Brasília	Embassy	Countries: Argentina; Chile; Colombia; Ecuador; Uruguay	
Canada	Ottawa	Embassy		
Canada	Toronto	Consulate		
Cuba	Havana	Embassy		
Mexico	Mexico City	Embassy	Countries: Antigua and Barbuda; Bahamas; Barbados; Belize; Costa Rica; Dominica; Dominican Republic; El Salvador; Guatemala; Guyana; Grenada; Haiti; Honduras; Jamaica; Nicaragua; Panama; Saint Kitts and Nevis; Saint Lucia; Saint Vincent and the Grenadines; Trinidad and Tobago; International Organizations: Association of Caribbean States; Caribbean Community; Community of Latin American and Caribbean States; OPANAL	
United States	Washington, D.C.	Embassy	International Organizations: Organization of American States (Note: Accredited as an observer mission.)	
United States	Houston	Consulate-General	International Organizations: Organization of American States	
United States	New York City	Consulate-General	International Organizations: Organization of American States	
United States	San Francisco	Consulate-General	International Organizations: Organization of American States	

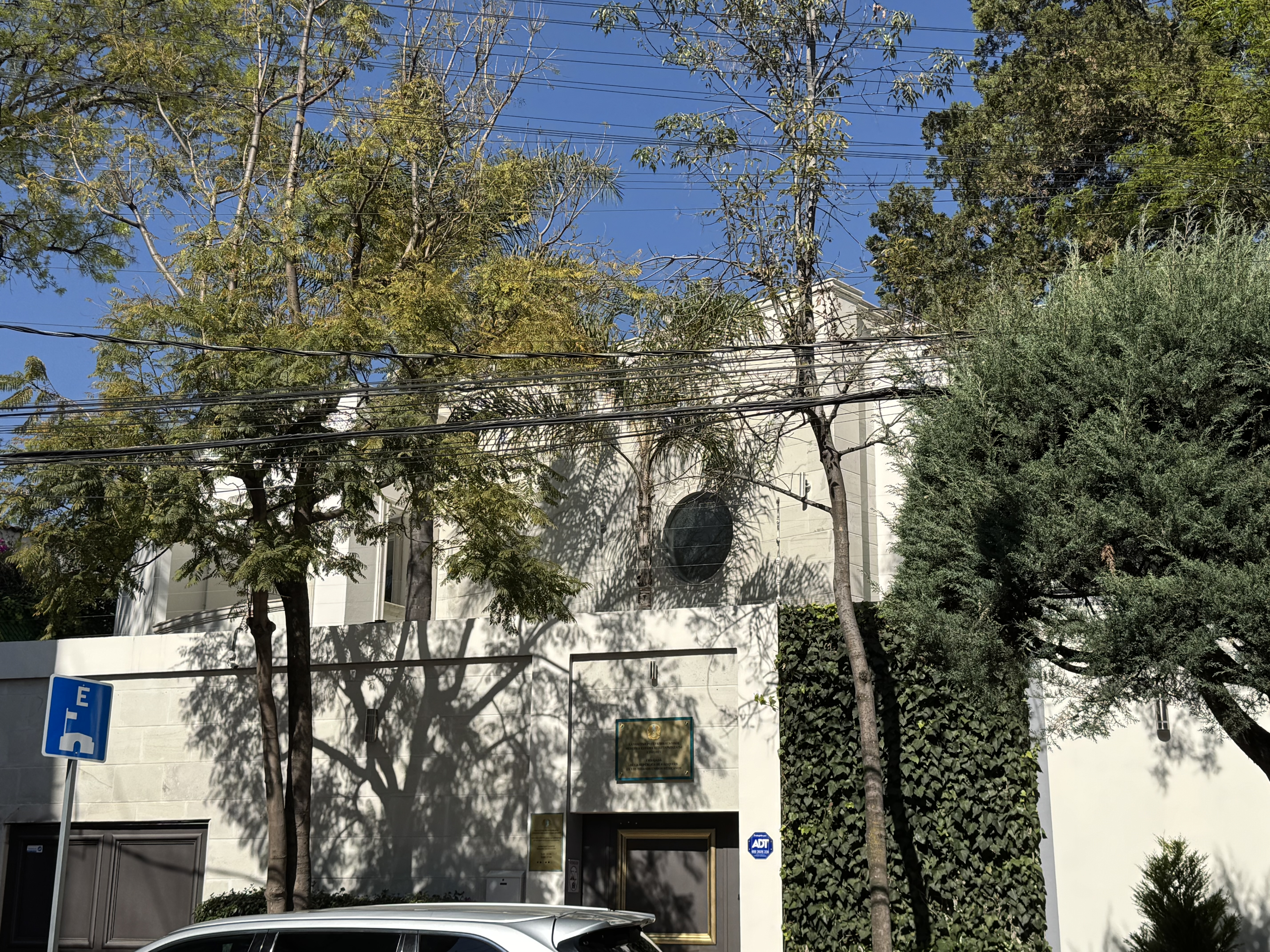
Embassy in Mexico City

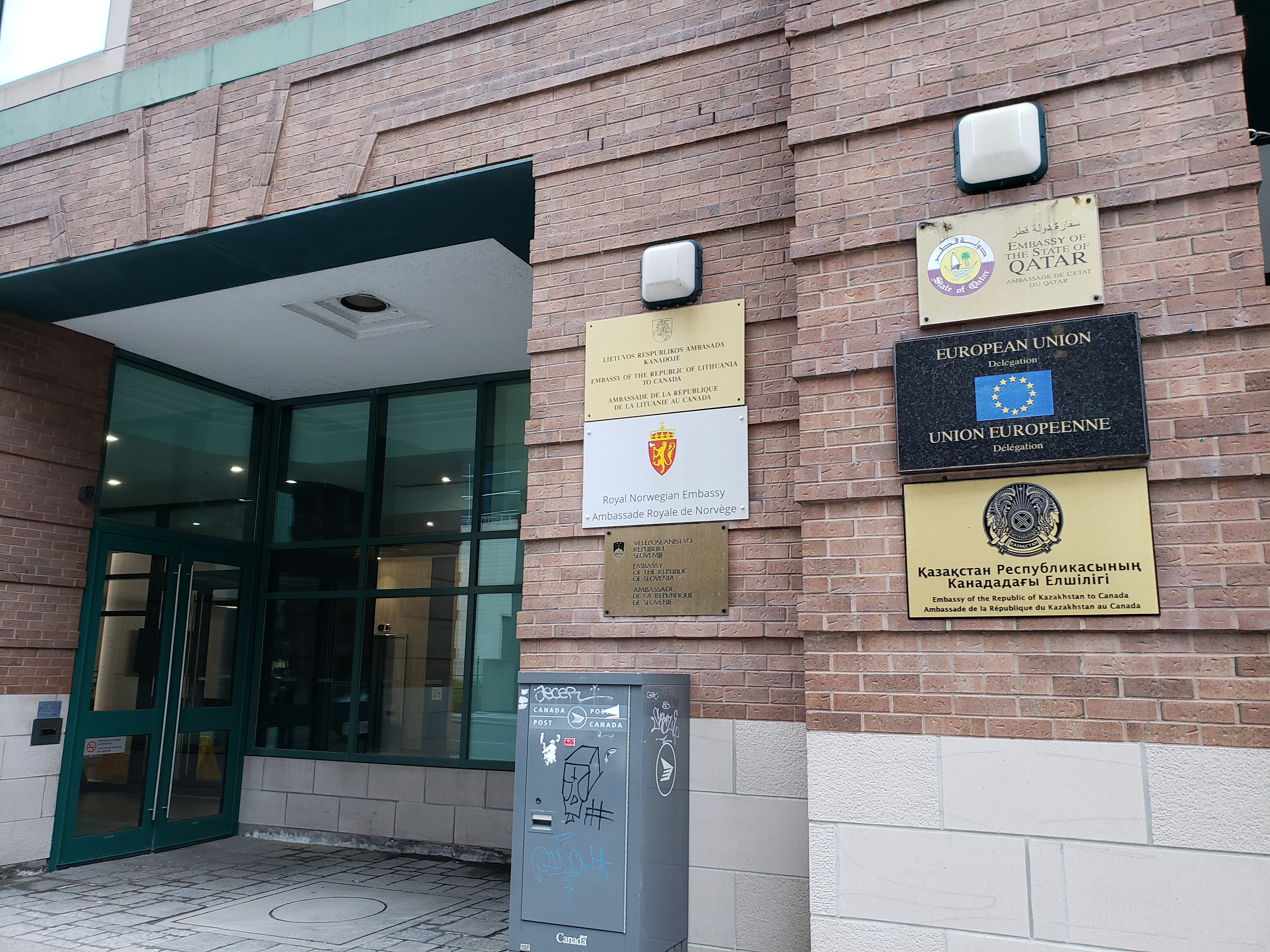
Embassy in Ottawa

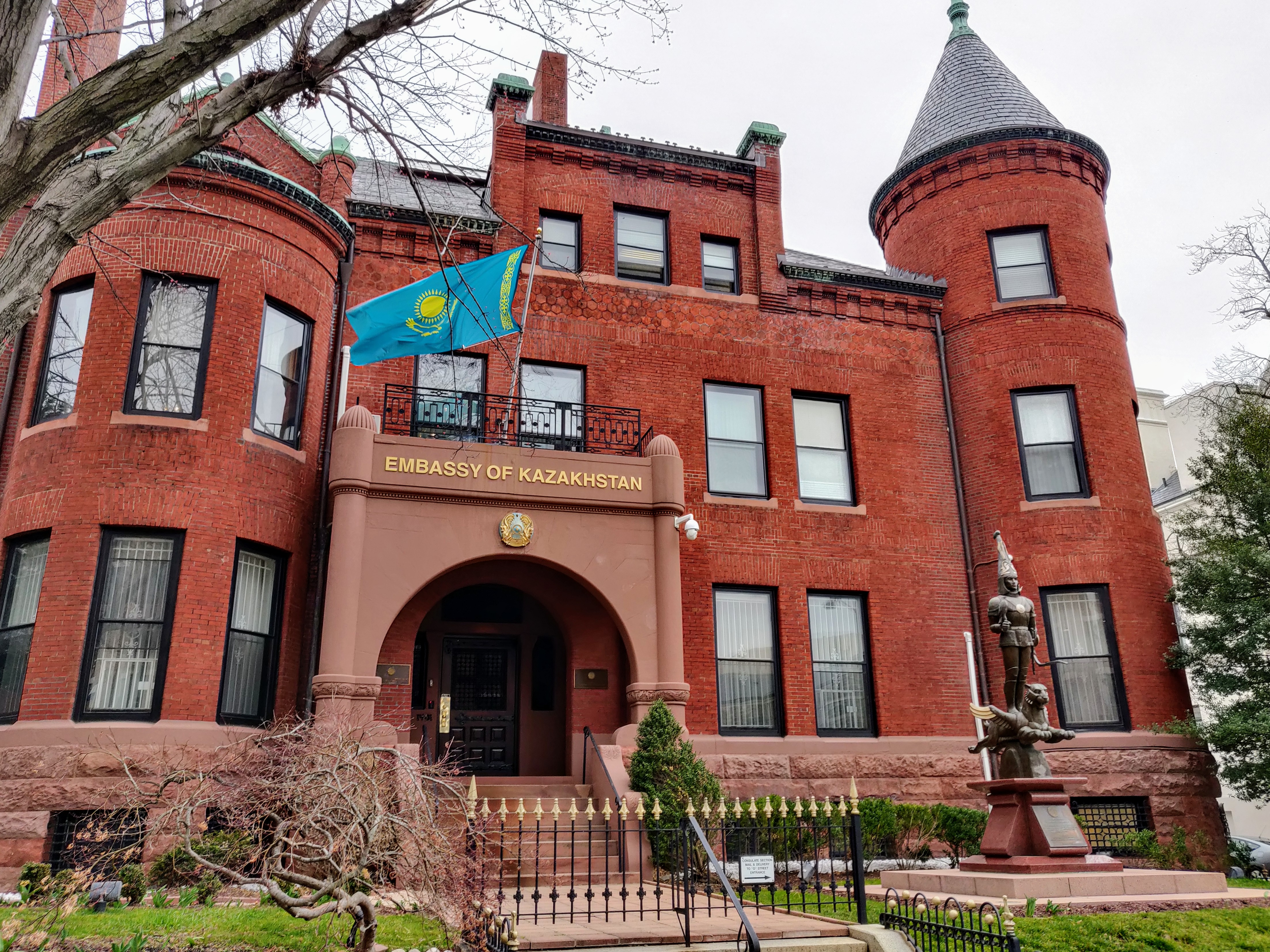
Embassy in Washington D.C.

=== Asia ===
Host country	Host city	Mission	Concurrent accreditation	Ref.
Afghanistan	Kabul	Embassy		
Armenia	Yerevan	Embassy		
Azerbaijan	Baku	Embassy		
Bahrain	Manama	Consulate-General		
China	Beijing	Embassy	Countries: North Korea	
China	Guangzhou	Consulate-General	Countries: North Korea	
China	Hong Kong	Consulate-General	Countries: North Korea	
China	Shanghai	Consulate-General	Countries: North Korea	
China	Xi'an	Consulate-General	Countries: North Korea	
China	Ürümqi	Passport & visa office	Countries: North Korea	
Cyprus	Nicosia	Embassy		
Georgia	Tbilisi	Embassy		
India	New Delhi	Embassy	Countries: Bangladesh; Bhutan; Maldives; Nepal	
Indonesia	Jakarta	Embassy	Countries: Philippines; International Organizations: Association of Southeast Asian Nations	
Iran	Tehran	Embassy		
Iran	Gorgan	Consulate-General		
Iran	Bandar Abbas	Consulate		
Israel	Tel Aviv	Embassy		
Japan	Tokyo	Embassy		
Jordan	Amman	Embassy	Countries: Iraq; Palestine	
Kuwait	Kuwait City	Embassy		
Kyrgyzstan	Bishkek	Embassy		
Kyrgyzstan	Osh	Consulate-General		
Lebanon	Beirut	Embassy		
Malaysia	Kuala Lumpur	Embassy	Countries: Brunei	
Mongolia	Ulaanbaatar	Embassy		
Oman	Muscat	Embassy		
Pakistan	Islamabad	Embassy		
Qatar	Doha	Embassy		
Saudi Arabia	Riyadh	Embassy	Countries: Bahrain; International Organizations: Organisation of Islamic Cooperation	
Saudi Arabia	Jeddah	Consulate-General	Countries: Bahrain; International Organizations: Organisation of Islamic Cooperation	
Singapore	Singapore	Embassy	Countries: Australia; New Zealand	
South Korea	Seoul	Embassy		
South Korea	Busan	Consulate-General		
Sri Lanka	Colombo	Embassy		
Syria	Damascus	Consulate		
Tajikistan	Dushanbe	Embassy		
Tajikistan	Khujand	Consulate		
Thailand	Bangkok	Embassy	Countries: Myanmar	
Thailand	Phuket	Consulate	Countries: Myanmar	
Turkey	Ankara	Embassy	International Organizations: Organization of Turkic States	
Turkey	Antalya	Consulate-General	International Organizations: Organization of Turkic States	
Turkey	Istanbul	Consulate-General	International Organizations: Organization of Turkic States	
Turkmenistan	Ashgabat	Embassy		
Turkmenistan	Türkmenbaşy	Consulate		
United Arab Emirates	Abu Dhabi	Embassy		
United Arab Emirates	Dubai	Consulate-General		
Uzbekistan	Tashkent	Embassy		
Uzbekistan	Samarkand	Consulate-General		
Vietnam	Hanoi	Embassy	Countries: Cambodia; Laos	

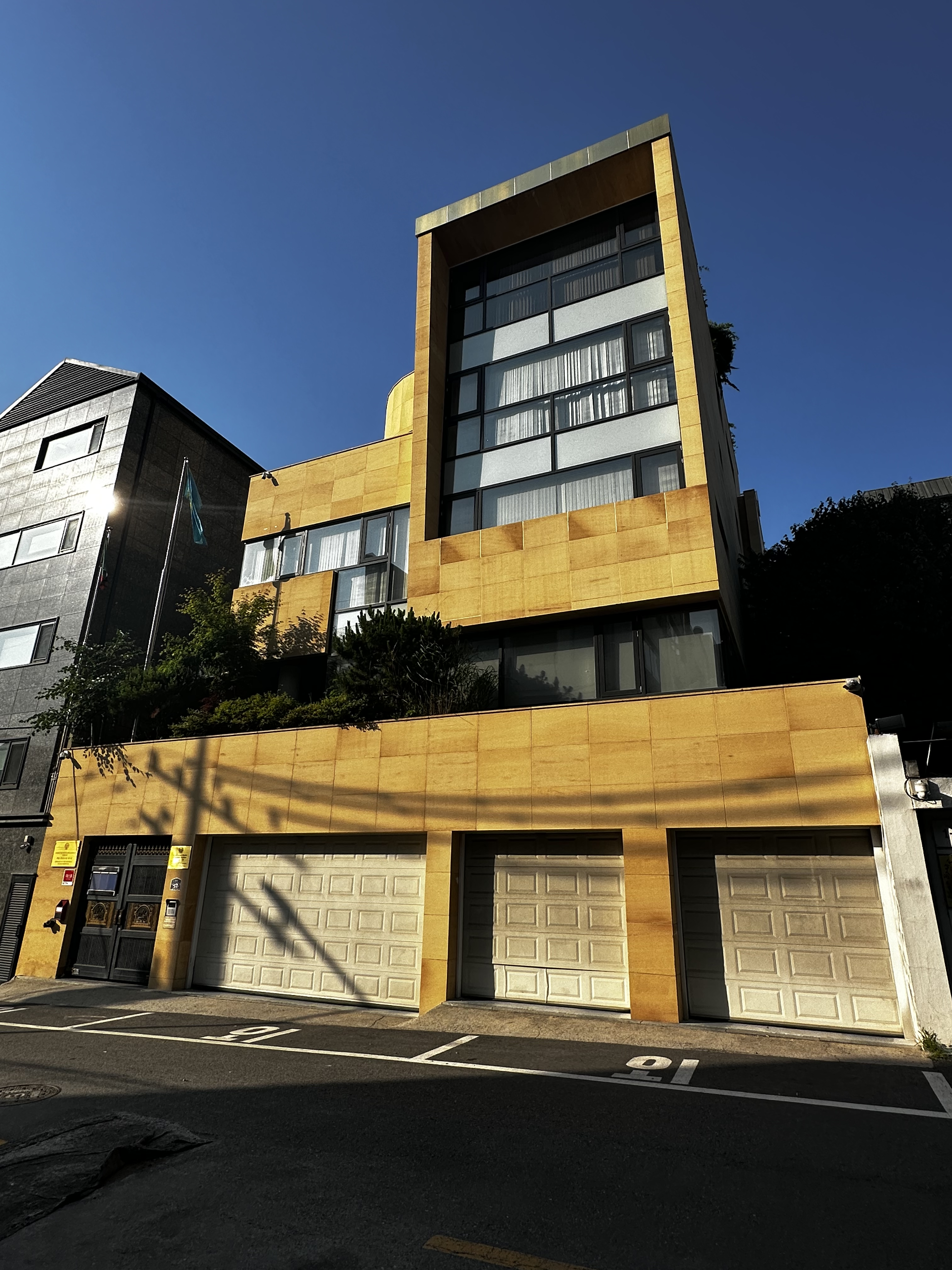
Embassy in Seoul

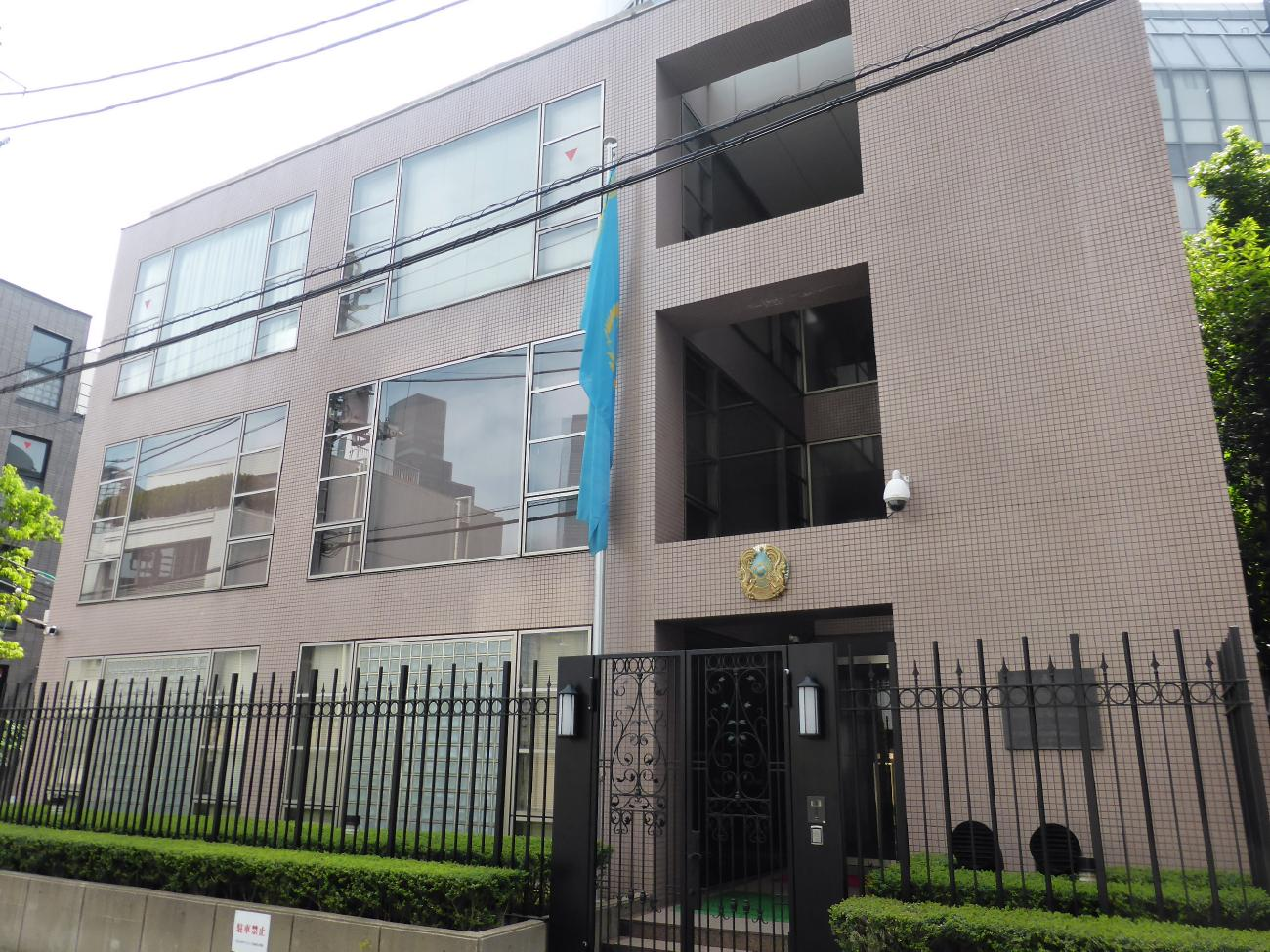
Embassy in Tokyo

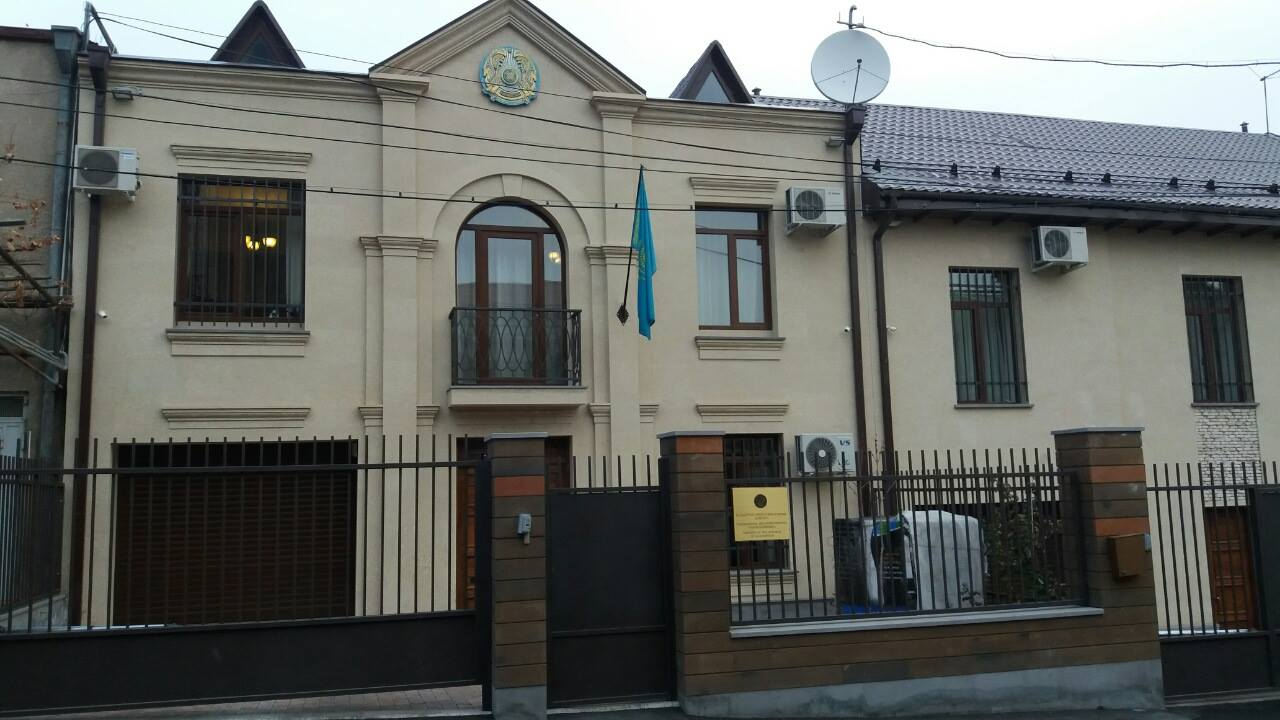
Embassy in Yerevan

=== Europe ===
Host country	Host city	Mission	Concurrent accreditation	Ref.
Albania	Tirana	Embassy		
Austria	Vienna	Embassy	International Organizations: Organization for Security and Co-operation in Europe; United Nations; International Atomic Energy Agency; CTBTO Preparatory Commission; United Nations Industrial Development Organization; United Nations Office for Outer Space Affairs; United Nations Office on Drugs and Crime	
Belarus	Minsk	Embassy		
Belarus	Brest	Consulate-General		
Belgium	Brussels	Embassy	Countries: Luxembourg; International Organizations: European Union; NATO	
Bulgaria	Sofia	Embassy		
Croatia	Zagreb	Embassy	Countries: Bosnia and Herzegovina; Montenegro	
Czechia	Prague	Embassy		
Estonia	Tallinn	Embassy		
Finland	Helsinki	Embassy		
France	Paris	Embassy	Countries: Monaco	
France	Strasbourg	Consulate-General	Countries: Monaco	
Germany	Berlin	Embassy		
Germany	Bonn	Embassy branch office		
Germany	Frankfurt	Consulate-General		
Germany	Munich	Consulate-General		
Greece	Athens	Embassy		
Holy See	Rome	Embassy	Sovereign Entity: Sovereign Military Order of Malta	
Hungary	Budapest	Embassy		
Italy	Rome	Embassy	Countries: Malta; San Marino	
Latvia	Riga	Embassy		
Lithuania	Vilnius	Embassy		
Moldova	Chișinău	Embassy		
Montenegro	Podgorica	Consulate-General (Note: Subordinate to the embassy in Zagreb.)		
Netherlands	The Hague	Embassy	International Organizations: Organisation for the Prohibition of Chemical Weapons	
North Macedonia	Skopje	Embassy		
Norway	Oslo	Embassy		
Poland	Warsaw	Embassy		
Portugal	Lisbon	Embassy	Countries: Congo-Brazzaville	
Romania	Bucharest	Embassy		
Russia	Moscow	Embassy		
Russia	Astrakhan	Consulate-General		
Russia	Kazan	Consulate-General		
Russia	Omsk	Consulate-General		
Russia	Saint Petersburg	Consulate-General		
Russia	Yekaterinburg	Consulate-General		
Serbia	Belgrade	Embassy		
Slovakia	Bratislava	Embassy		
Slovenia	Ljubljana	Embassy		
Spain	Madrid	Embassy	Countries: Andorra; International Organizations: UN Tourism	
Spain	Barcelona	Consulate	Countries: Andorra; International Organizations: UN Tourism	
Sweden	Stockholm	Embassy	Countries: Denmark	
Switzerland	Bern	Embassy	Countries: Liechtenstein	
Ukraine	Kyiv	Embassy		
United Kingdom	London	Embassy	Countries: Iceland; Ireland	

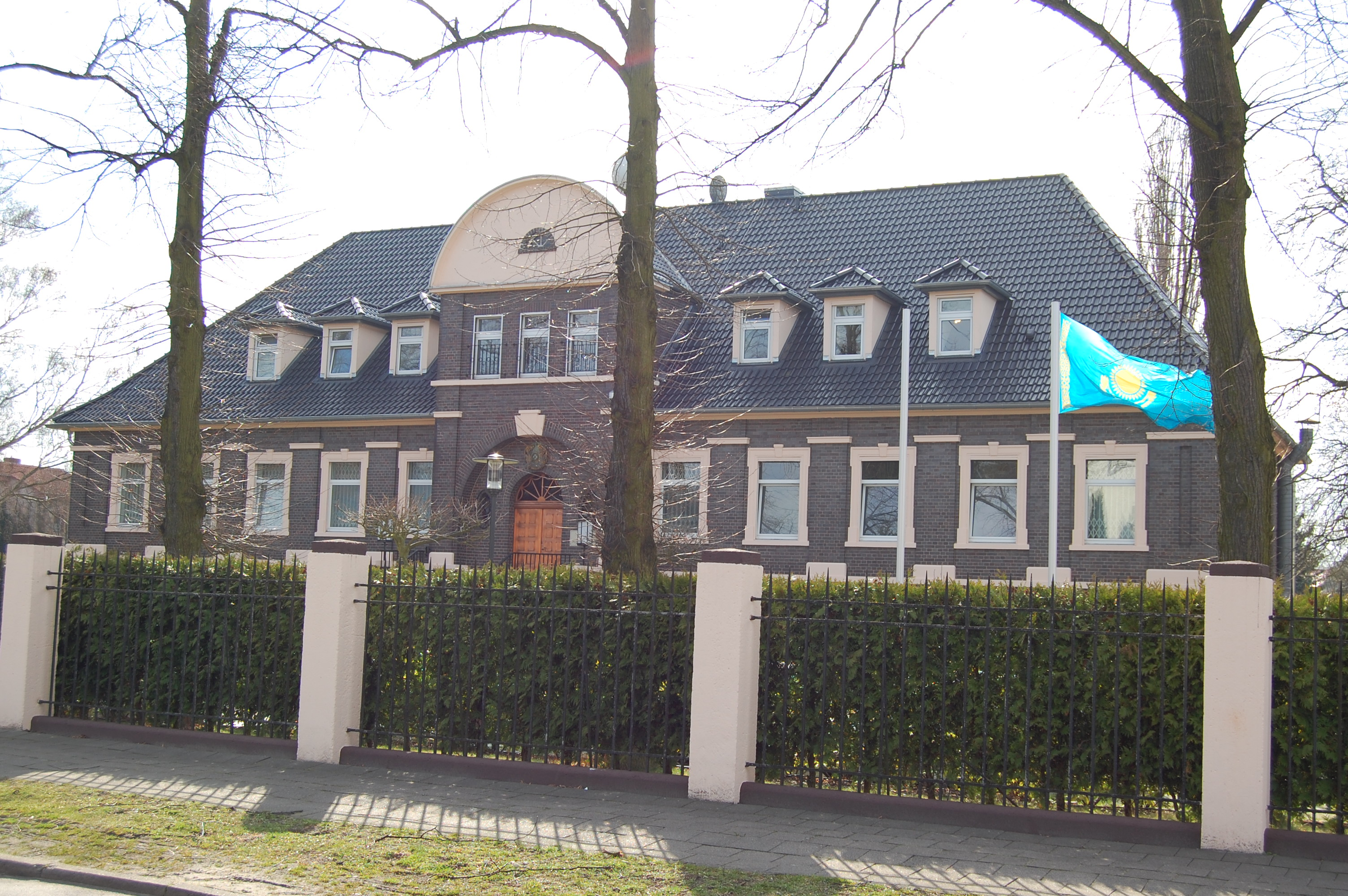
Embassy in Berlin

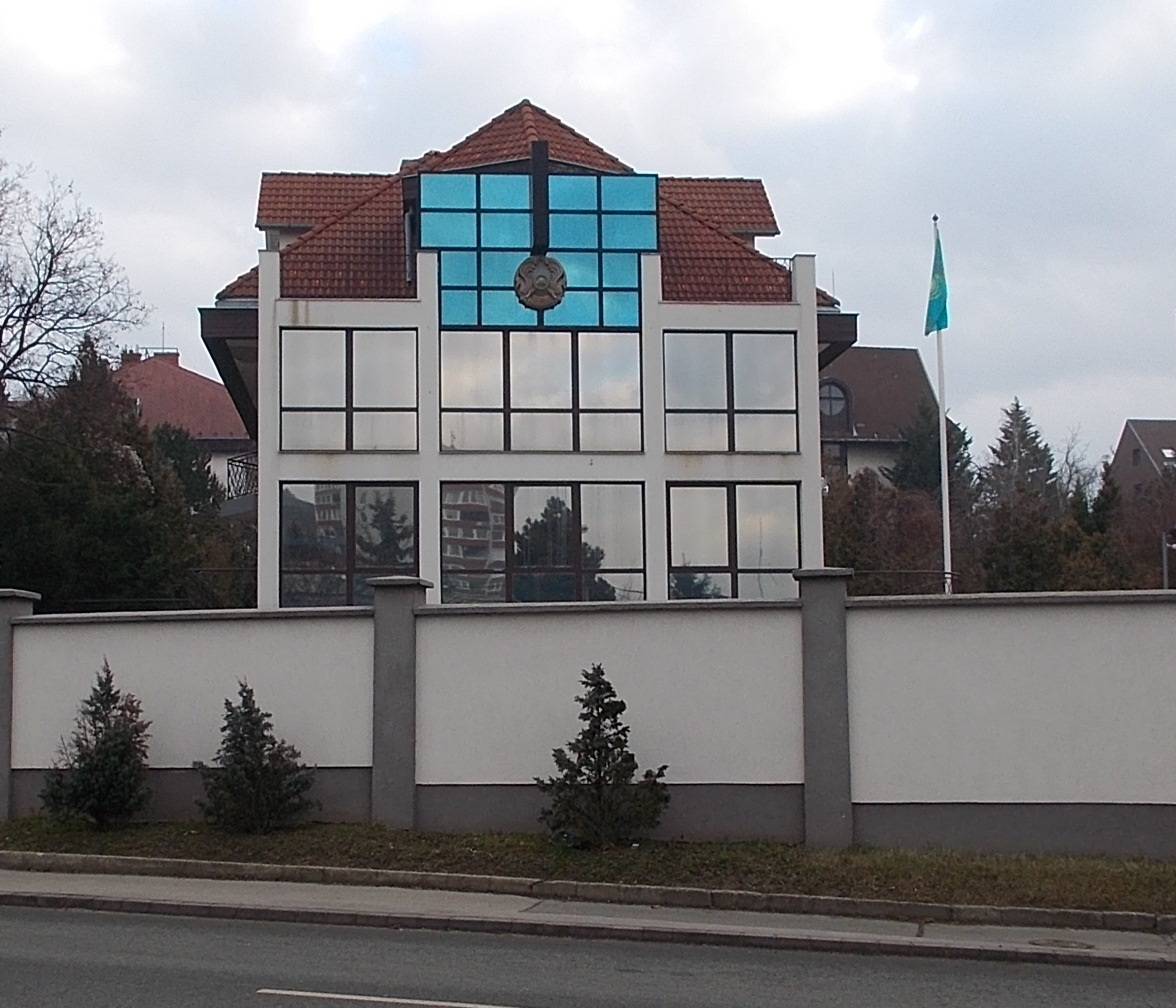
Embassy in Budapest

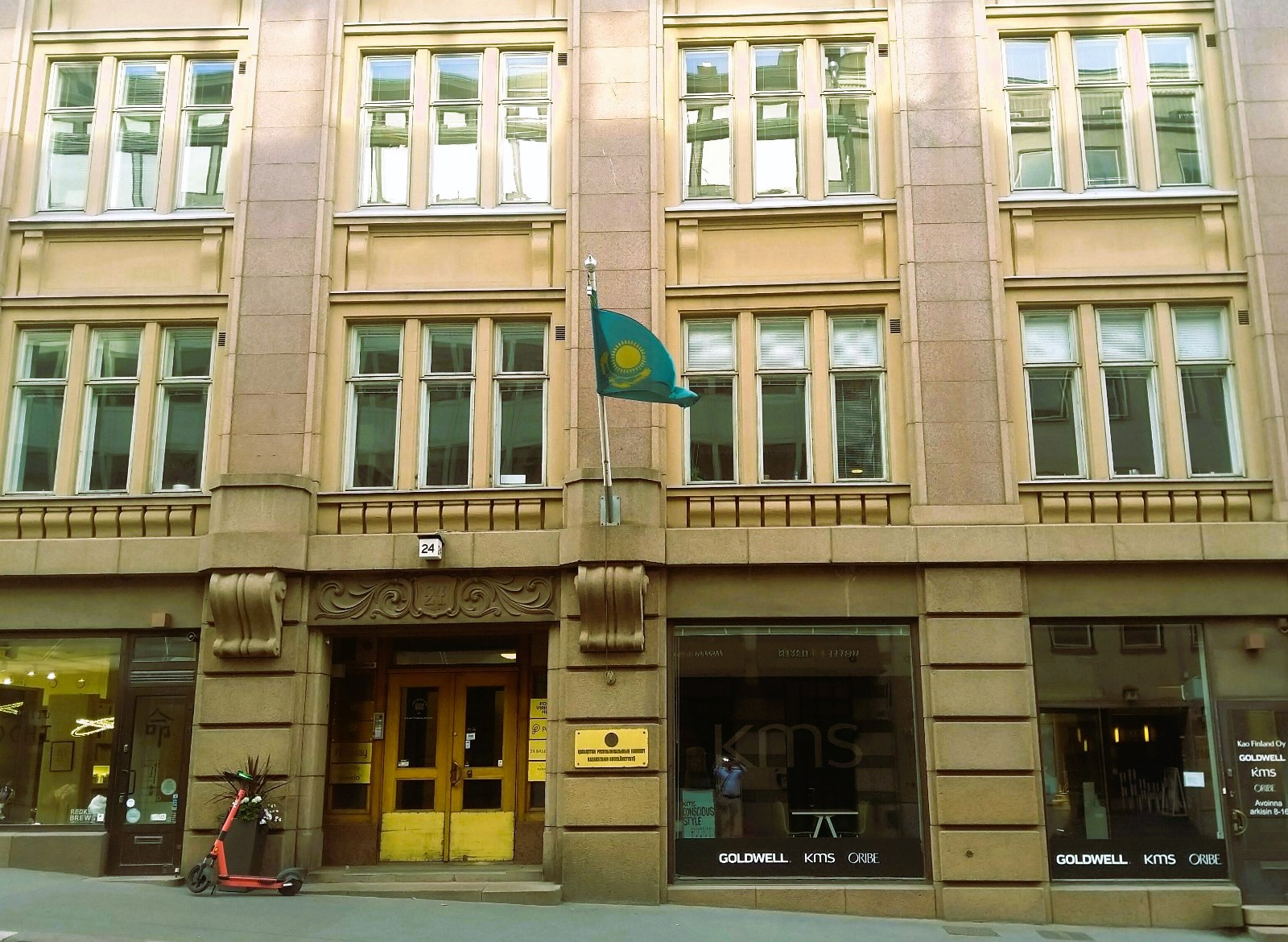
Embassy in Helsinki

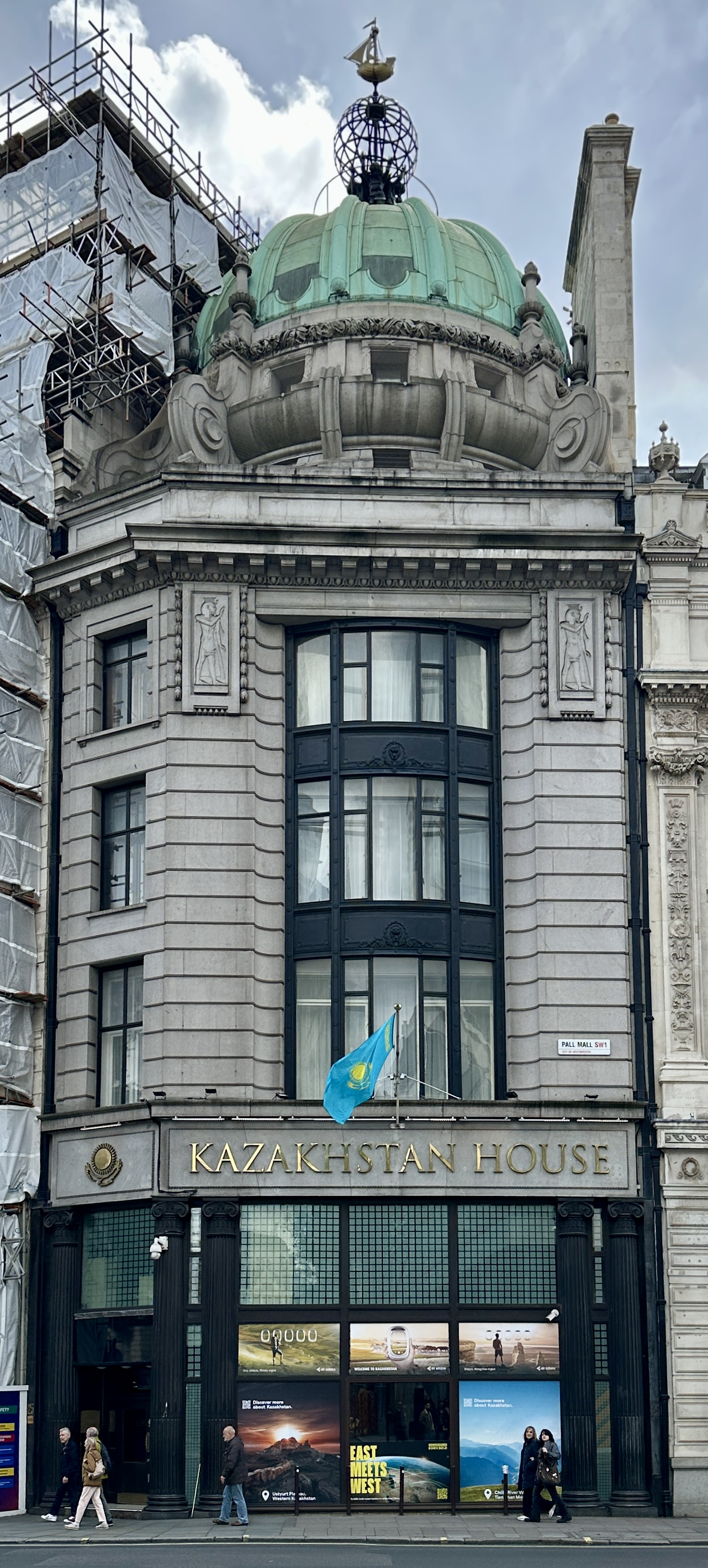
Embassy in London

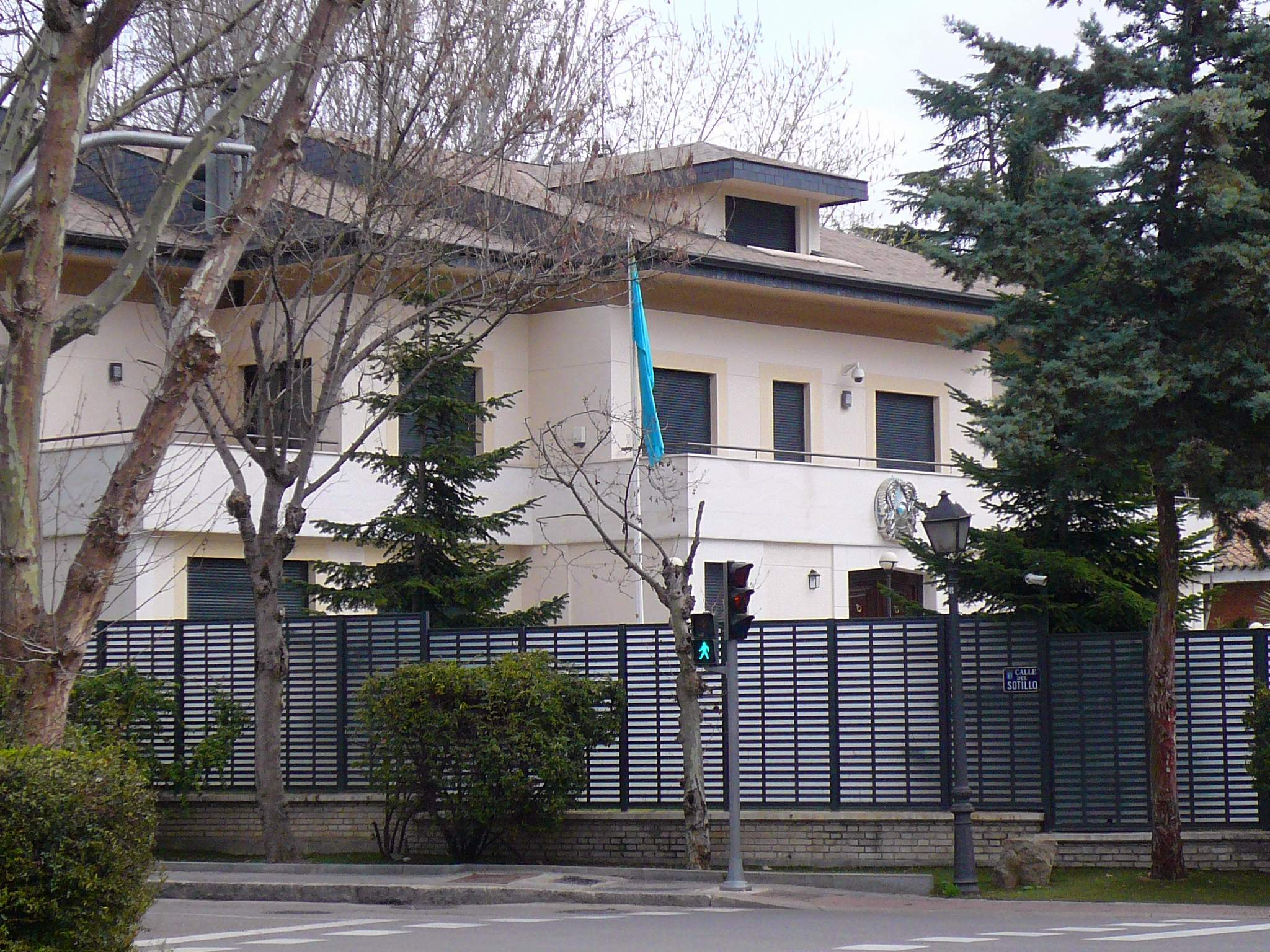
Embassy in Madrid

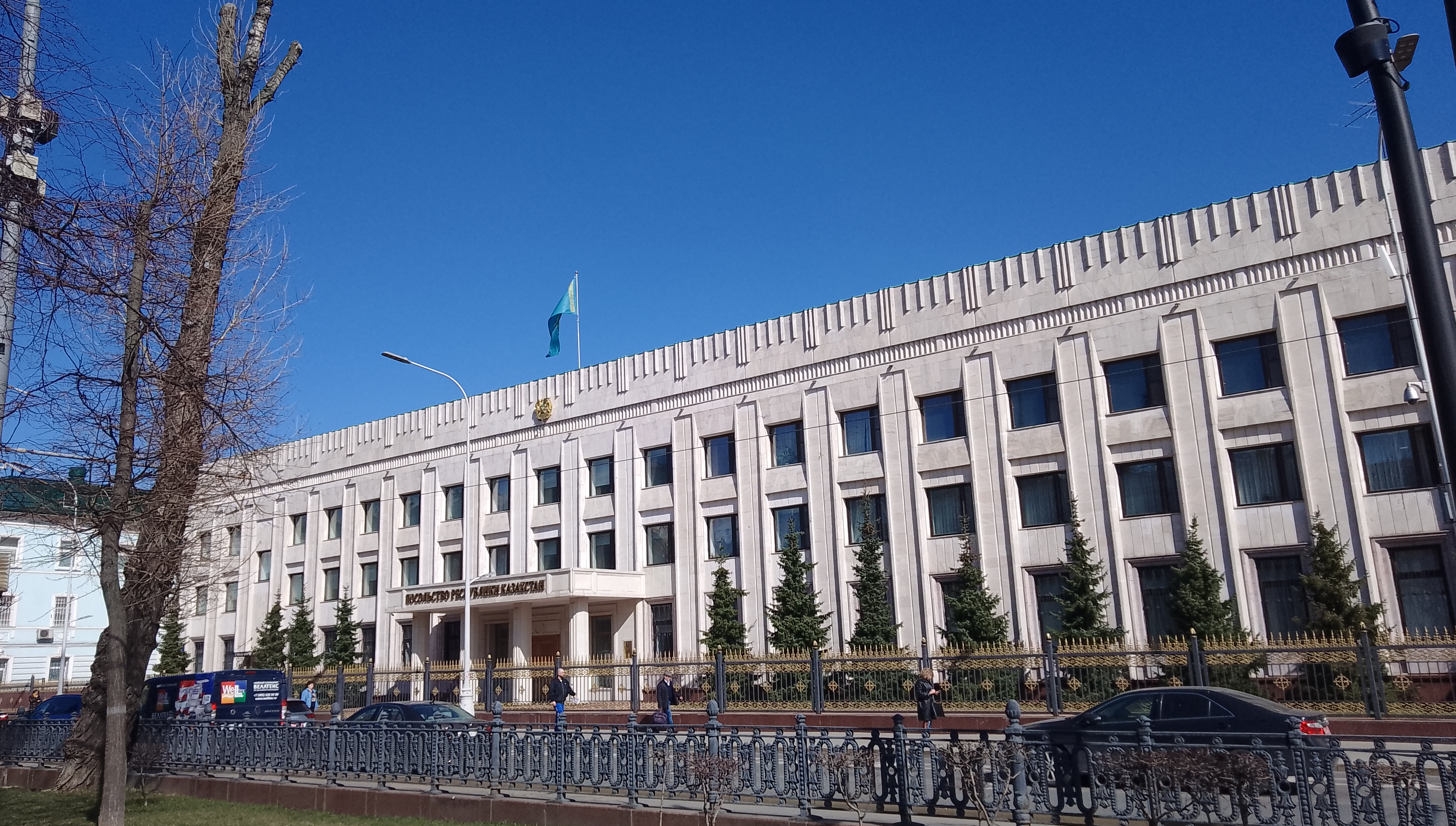
Embassy in Moscow

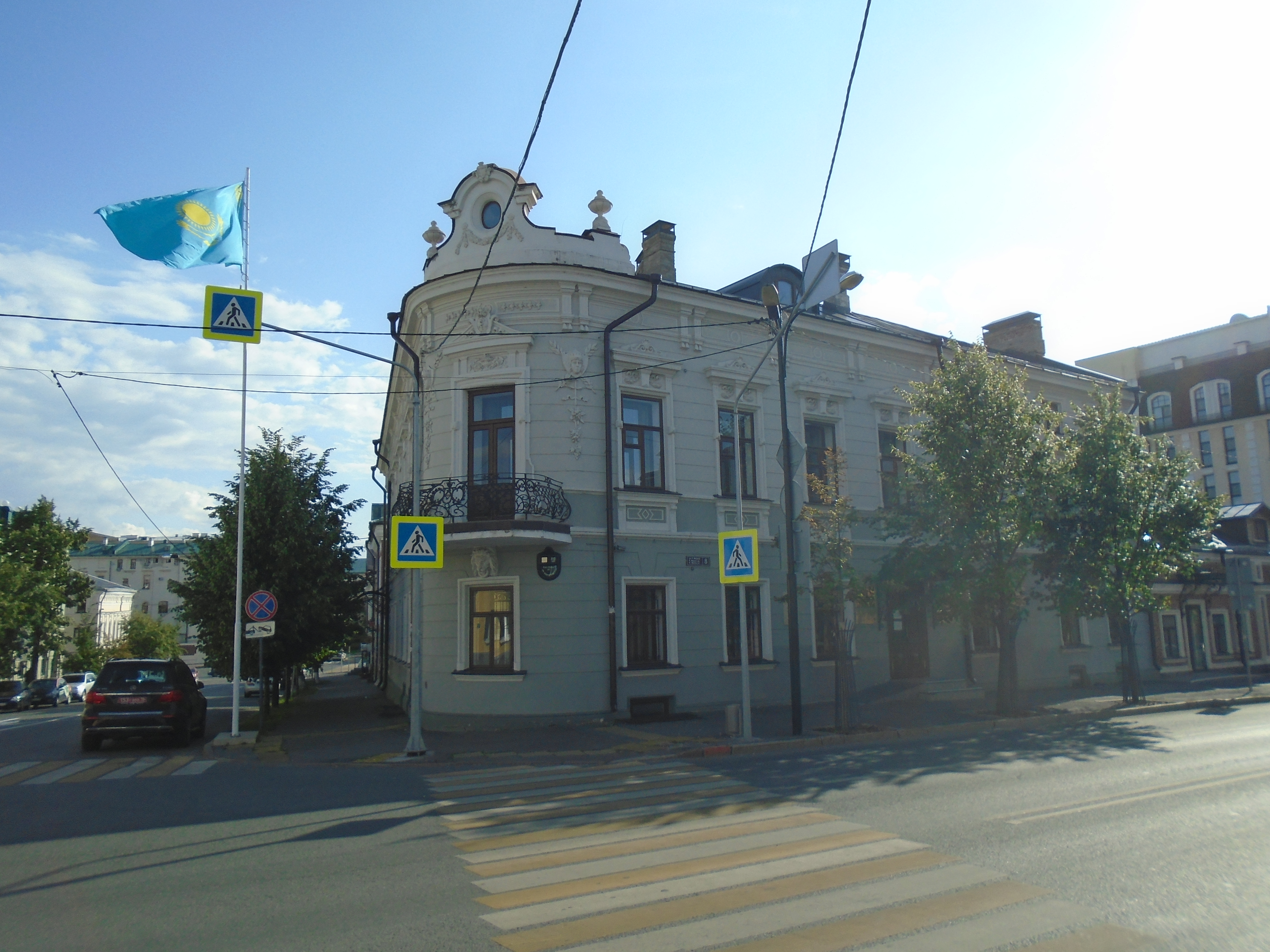
Consulate-General in Kazan

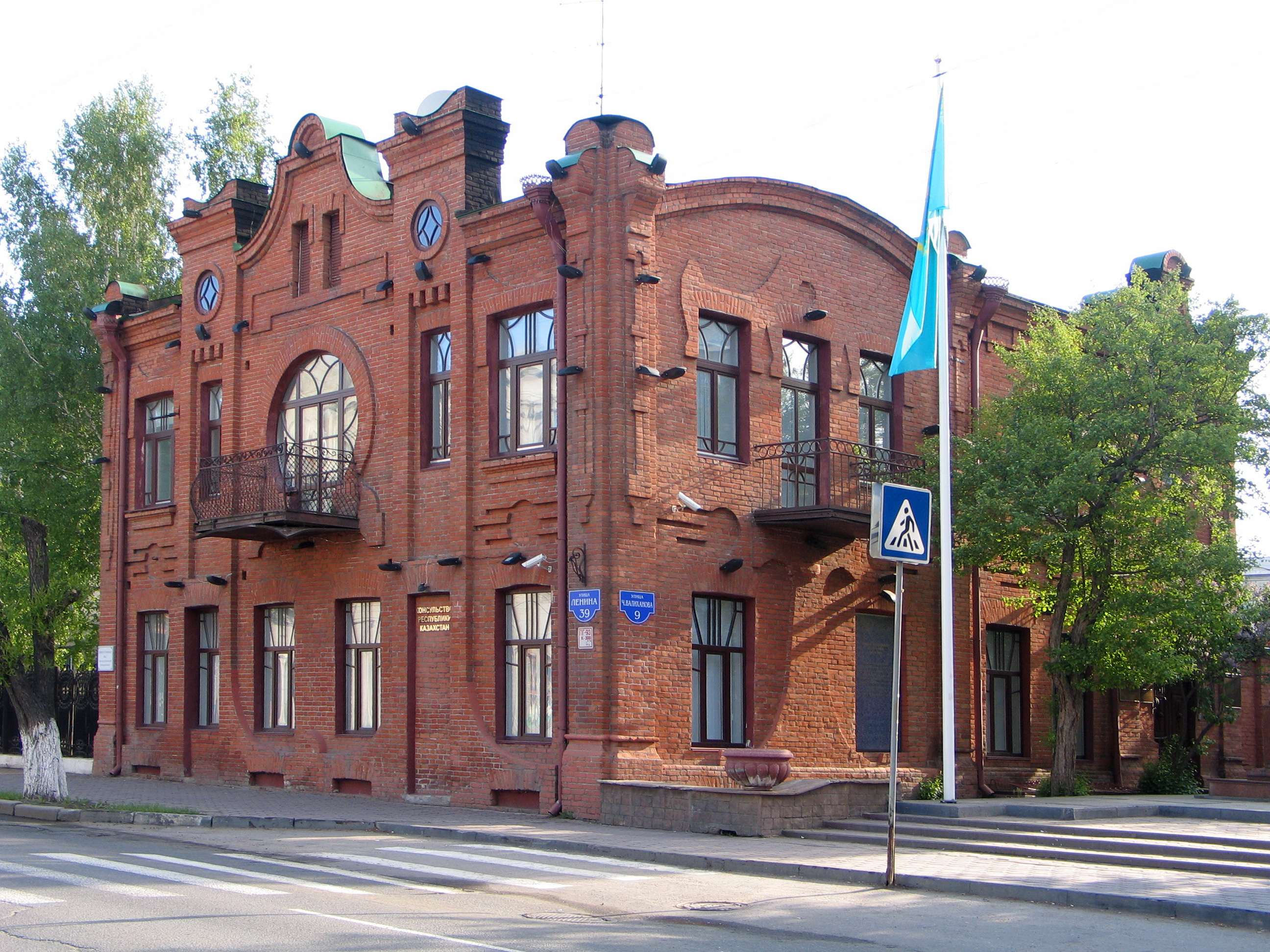
Consulate-General in Omsk

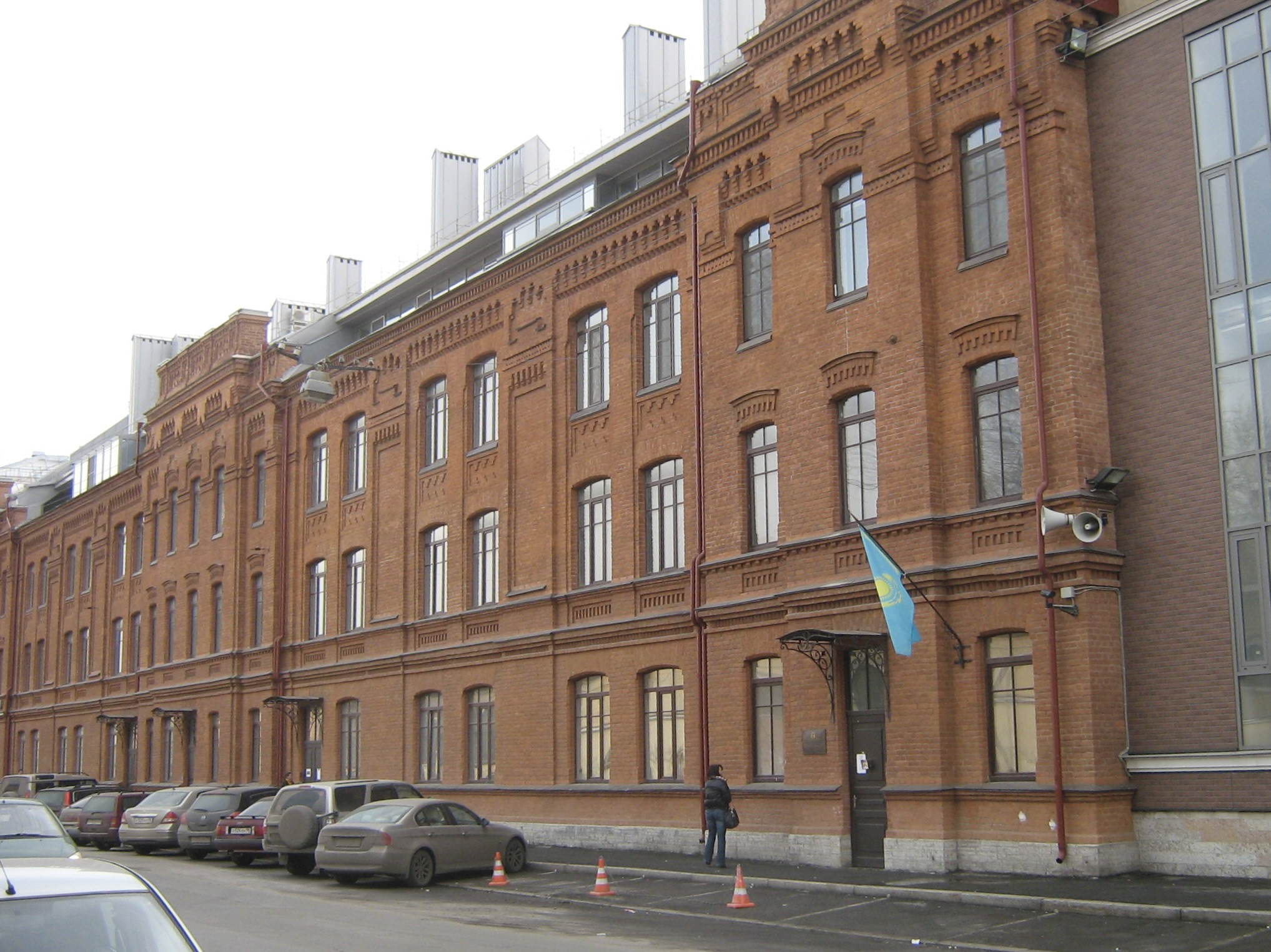
Consulate-General in Saint Petersburg

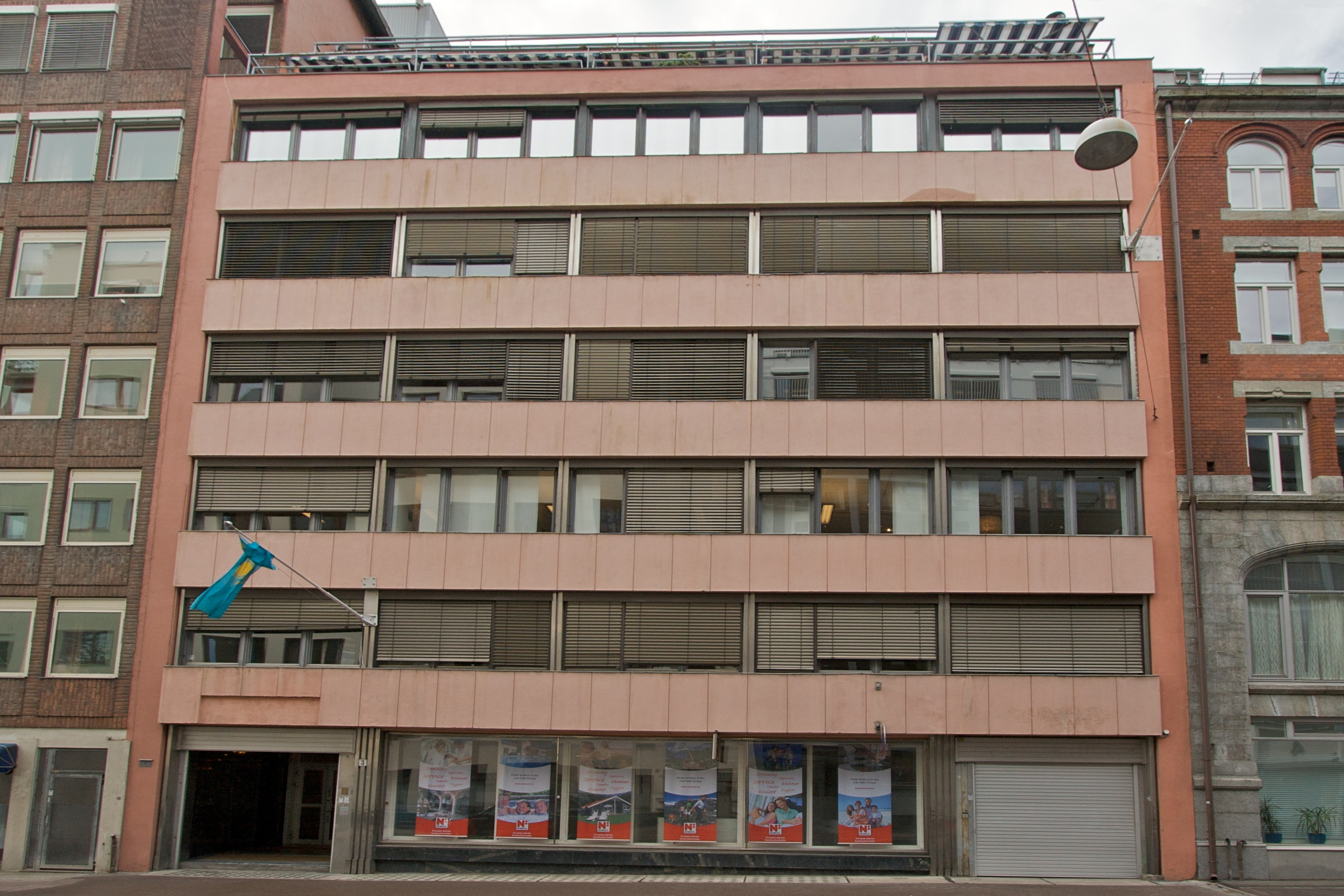
Building hosting the embassy in Oslo

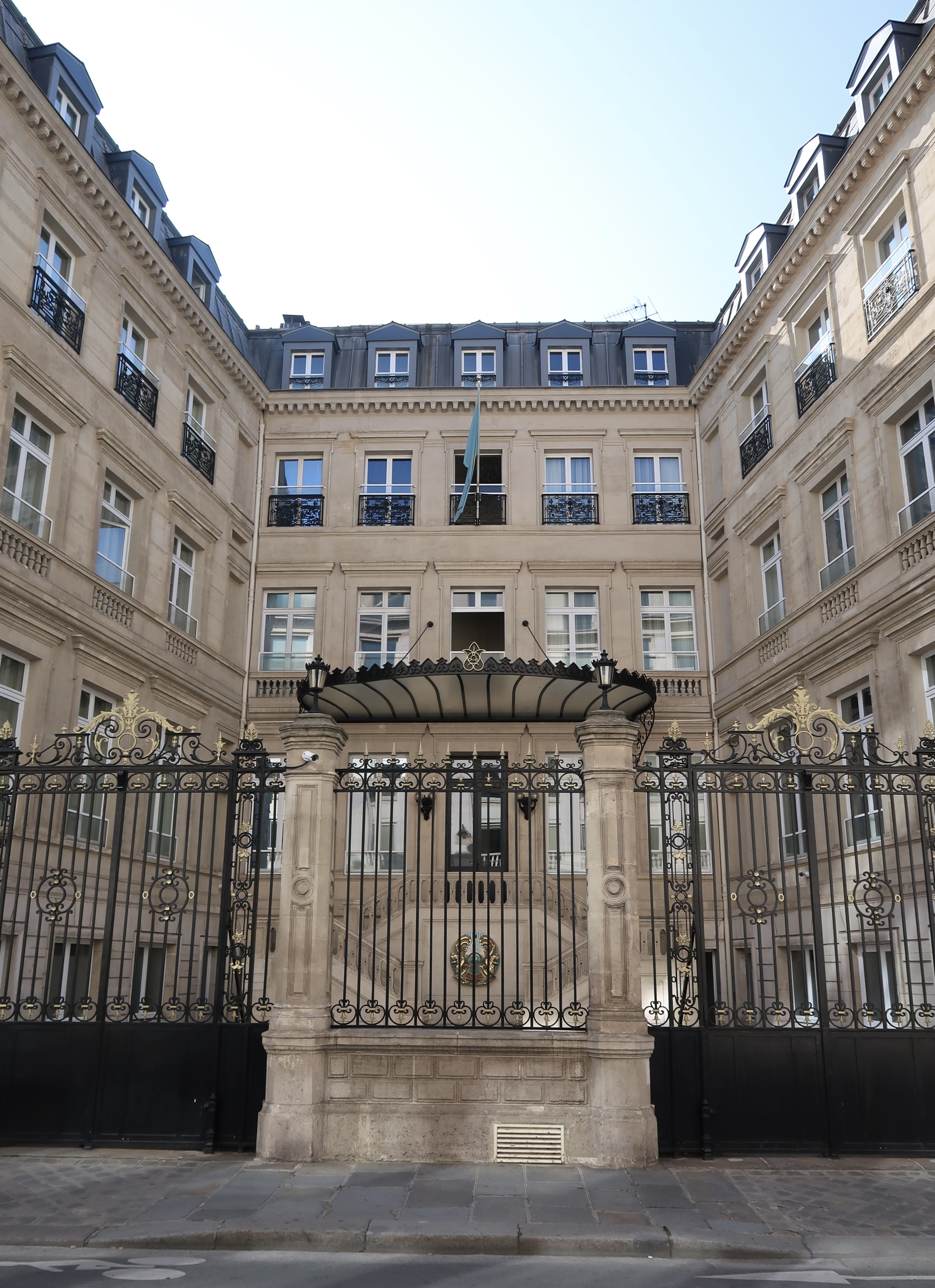
Embassy in Paris

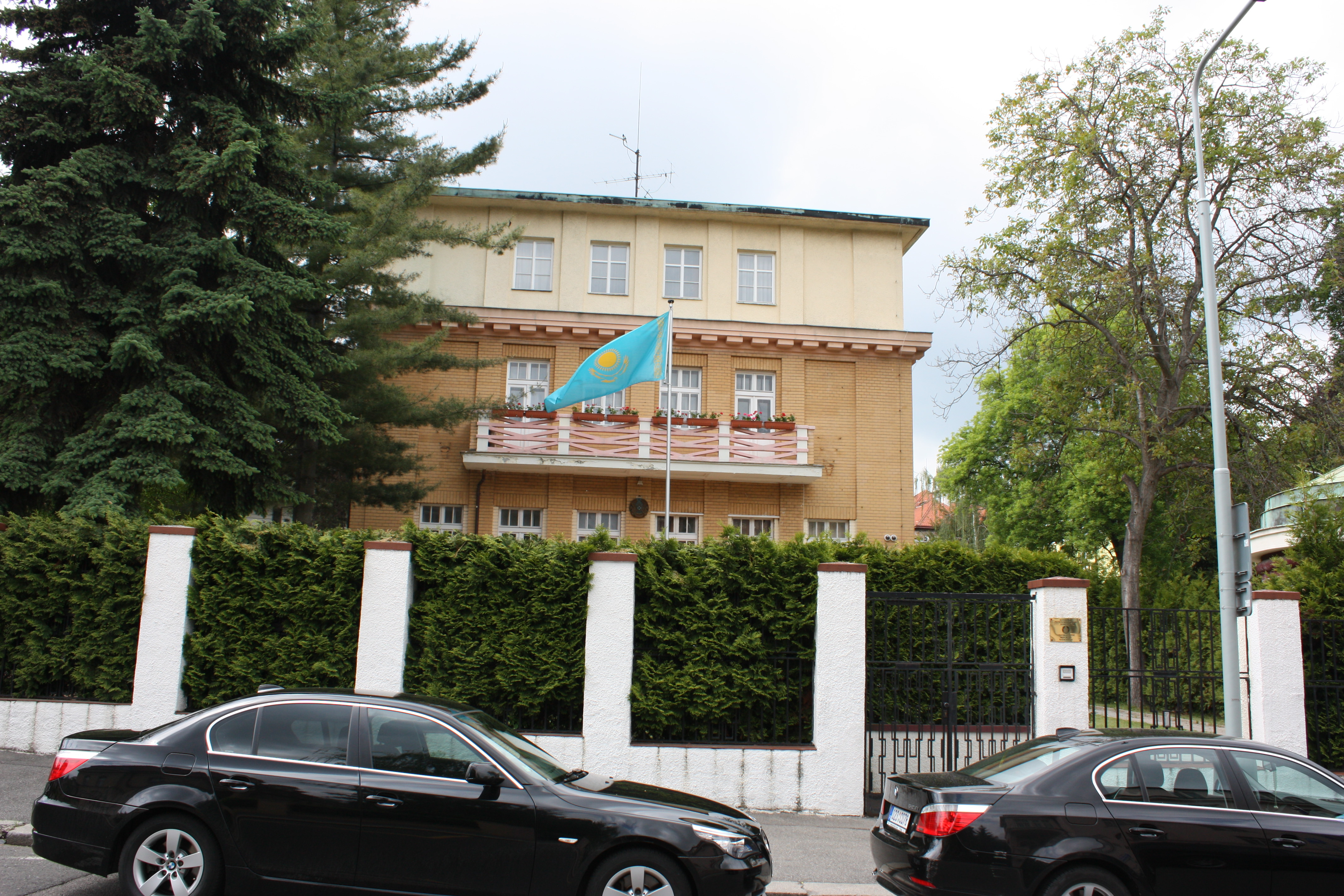
Embassy in Prague

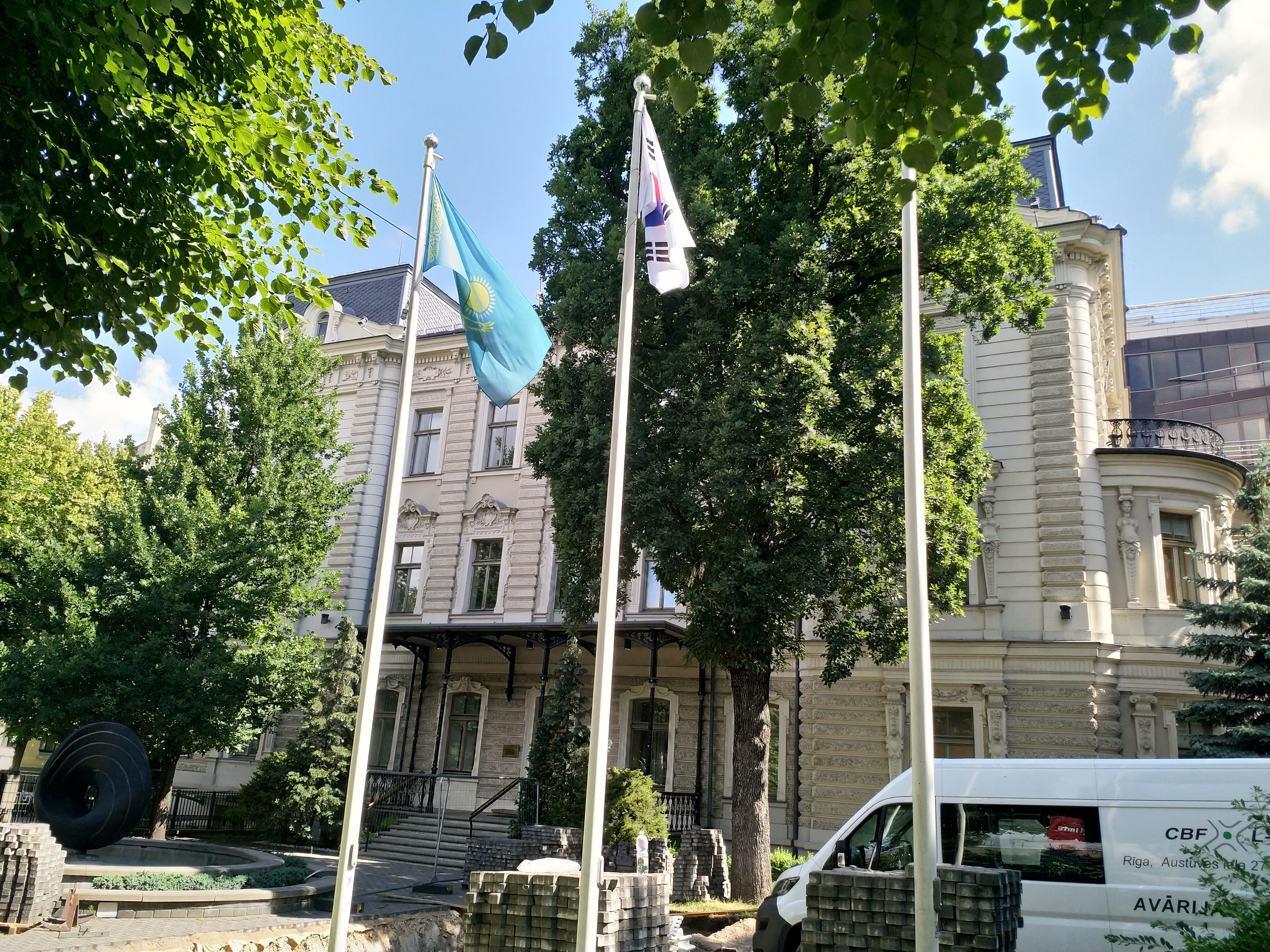
Embassy in Riga

Embassy in Sofia

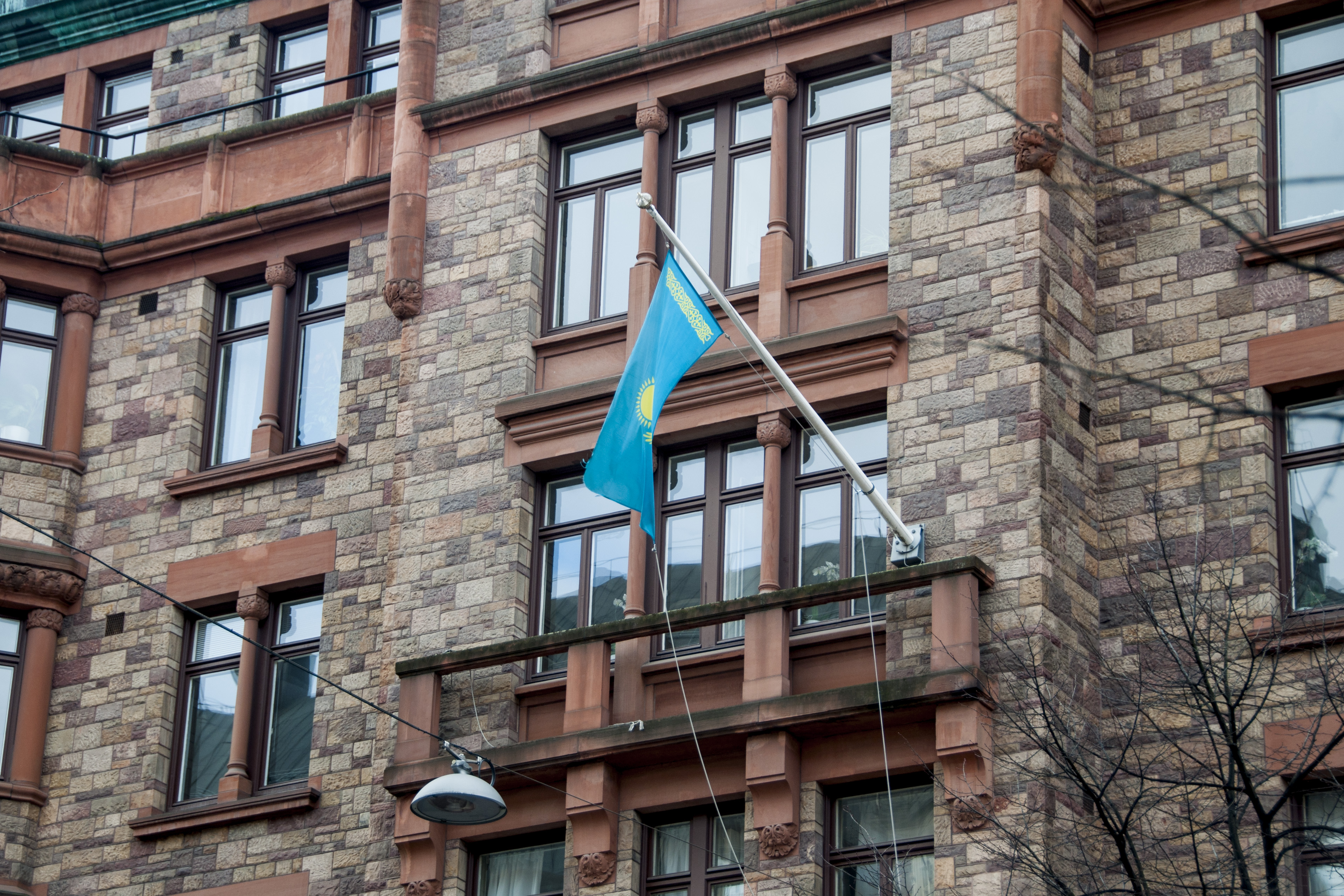
Embassy in Stockholm

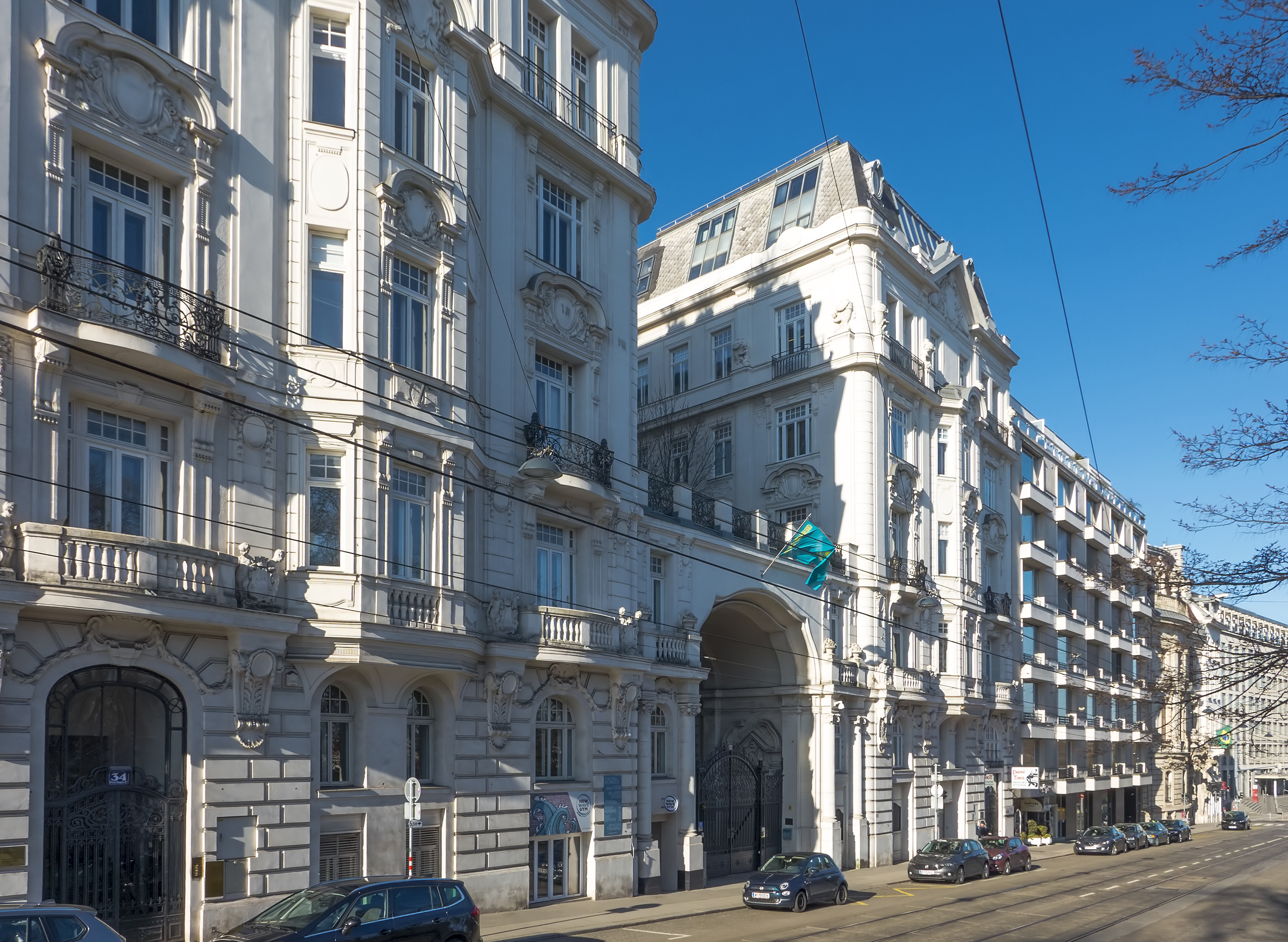
Embassy in Vienna

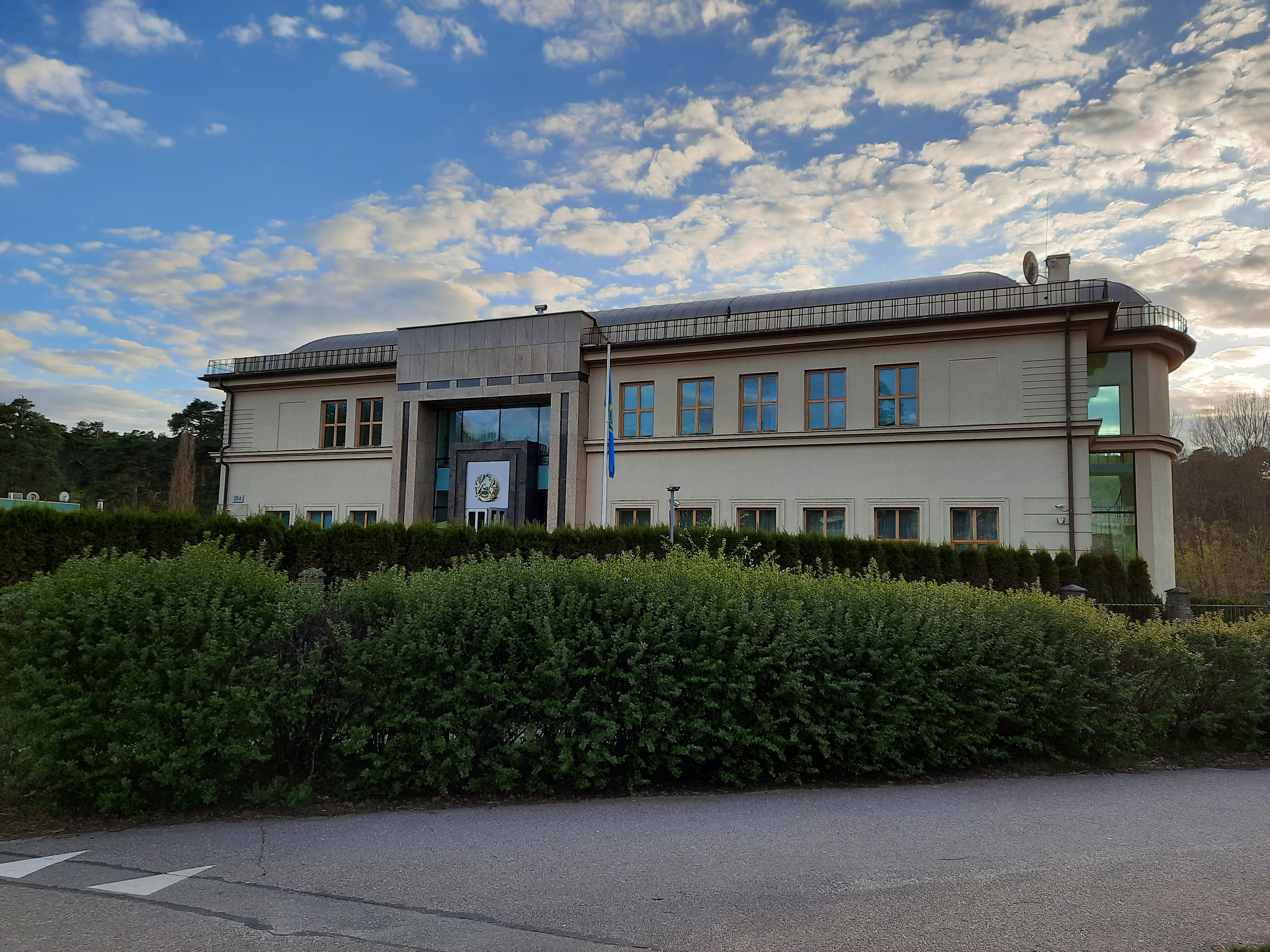
Embassy in Vilnius

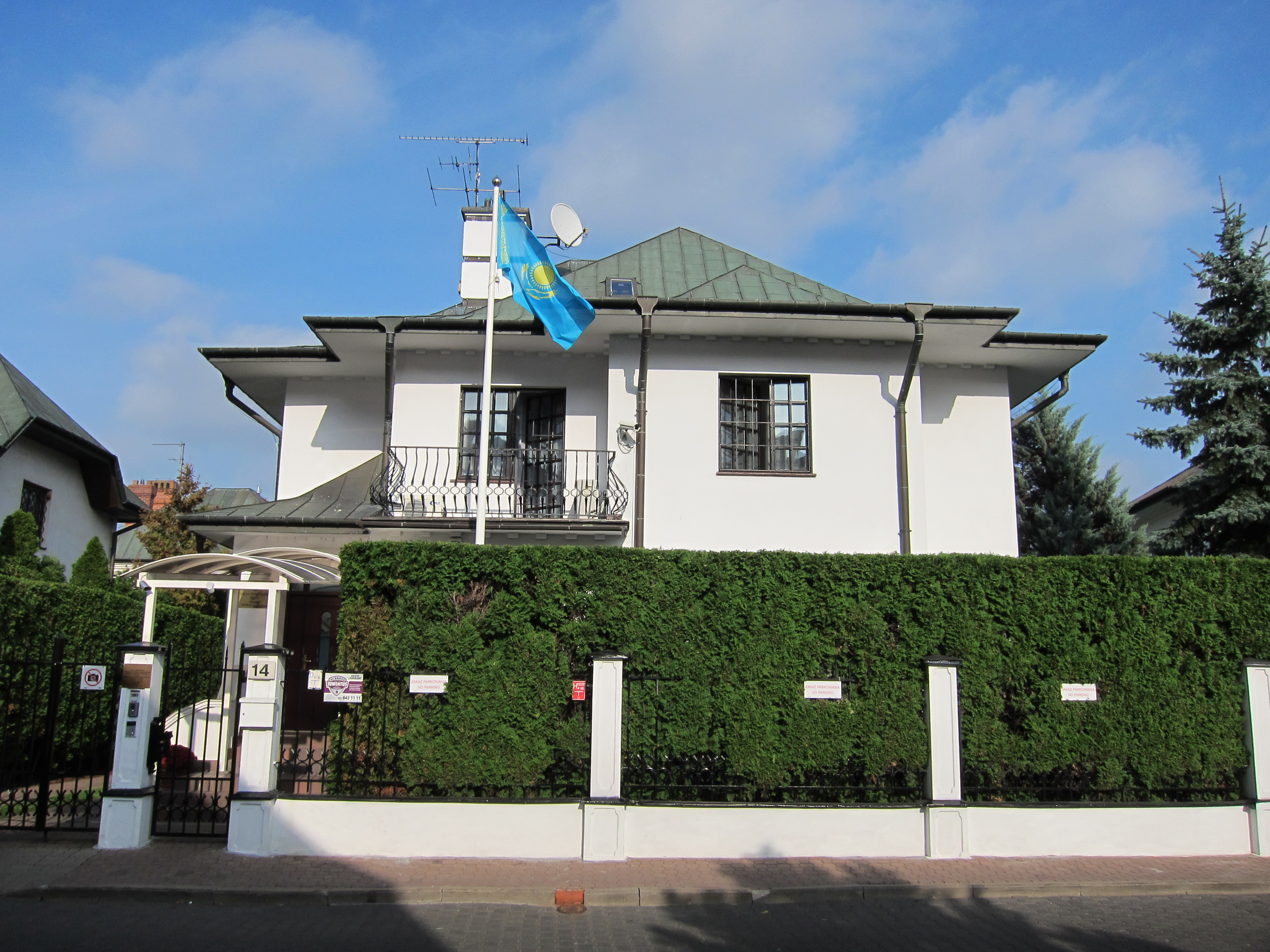
Embassy in Warsaw

=== Multilateral organisations ===
Organization	Host city	Host country	Mission	Concurrent accreditation	Ref.
International Civil Aviation Organization	Montreal	Canada	Permanent Representation		
United Nations	New York City	United States	Permanent Mission		
United Nations	Geneva	Switzerland	Permanent Mission	International Organizations: Conference on Disarmament	
UNESCO	Paris	France	Permanent Mission		
World Trade Organization	Geneva	Switzerland	Permanent Mission		

== Closed missions ==
=== Oceania ===
Host country	Host city	Mission	Year closed	Ref.
Australia	Sydney	Consulate-General	2024	

== See also ==
- Foreign relations of Kazakhstan
- List of diplomatic missions in Kazakhstan
- Visa policy of Kazakhstan
