= Consulate General of Kazakhstan, New York City =

Coordinates: 40°45′17″N 73°58′47″W

Consulate General of the Republic of Kazakhstan in New York Қазақстан Республикасының Нью-Йорк қаласындағы Бас консулдығы
- Location: Fifth Avenue, New York City, United States
- Address: 535 Fifth Avenue, 19th Floor, New York, NY 10017, USA
- Opened: 21 January 2010; 16 years ago
- Jurisdiction: New York, New Jersey, Connecticut, Massachusetts, Pennsylvania, Michigan, Maine, Vermont, Illinois, Indiana, Minnesota, Ohio, Rhode Island, Wisconsin
- Consul General: Rauan Tleulin
- Website: www.gov.kz/memleket/entities/mfa-newyork

The Consulate-General of the Republic of Kazakhstan in New York City (Kazakh: Қазақстан Республикасының Нью-Йорк қаласындағы Бас консулдығы; Russian: Генеральное консульство Республики Казахстан в г. Нью-Йорк) is a diplomatic mission of Kazakhstan in the United States. Established in 2009, the Consulate represents the interests of Kazakhstan in eastern and midwestern United States and provides consular-legal, cultural, and informational services to citizens and foreign nationals. The mission is located at 535 Fifth Avenue, 19th Floor, New York City.

== History ==
The Consulate-General in New York was established in accordance with Presidential Decree No. 851 "On the Opening of the Consulate-General of the Republic of Kazakhstan in New York (United States of America)", issued by President Nursultan Nazarbayev on 27 July 2009. According to the Ministry of Foreign Affairs of Kazakhstan, the decision to open the consulate was connected with the increasing volume of consular work in the northeastern United States and with the need to strengthen Kazakhstan's economic, cultural, and humanitarian ties in one of the world's major financial and diplomatic centers.

The consulate officially commenced its activities on 21 January 2010, with the opening ceremony attended by senior officials of Kazakhstan and the United States, representatives of the business community, and members of the Kazakh diaspora living in New York.

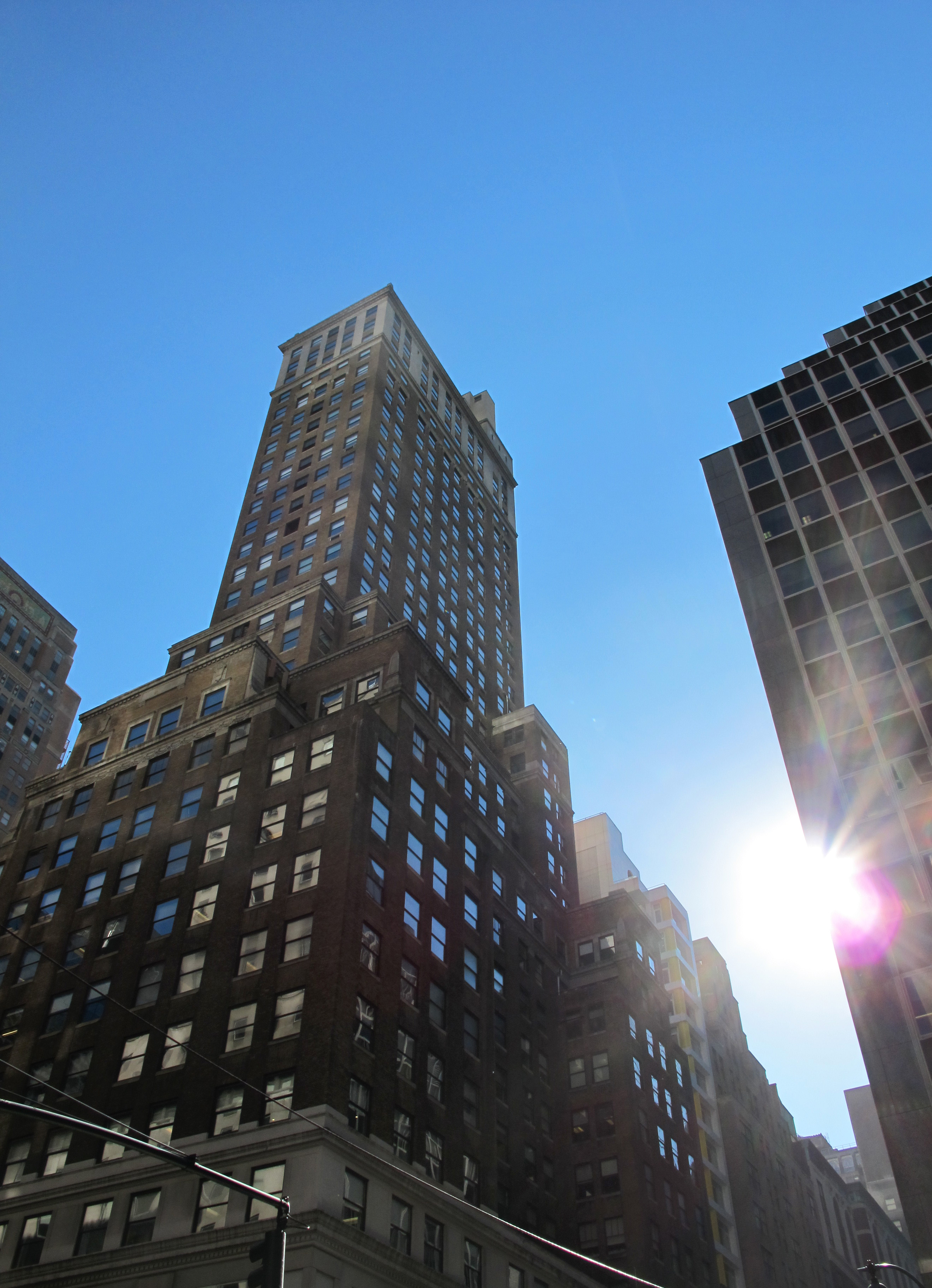
535 Fifth Avenue, the location of the Consulate-General

== Jurisdiction ==
The Consulate-General in New York serves a consular district, which includes the following U.S. states: New York, New Jersey, Connecticut, Massachusetts, Pennsylvania, Michigan, Maine, Vermont, Illinois, Indiana, Minnesota, Ohio, Rhode Island, and Wisconsin.

== Functions ==
The Consulate-General performs a range of diplomatic and consular functions, including:

- Providing consular and legal assistance to citizens of Kazakhstan residing or traveling in the United States.
- Issuing and renewing passports, visas, and other official documents.
- Maintaining the consular register for Kazakh citizens abroad, including long-term and temporary residents (учётная карточка).
- Promoting economic, cultural, educational, and humanitarian cooperation between Kazakhstan and the states within its district.
- Supporting investment projects, business contacts, and academic exchanges.

== Activities ==
The consulate maintains close cooperation with the Kazakh diaspora in New York, one of the most active Kazakh communities in the United States. The mission organizes cultural events, book presentations, exhibitions, and donations of Kazakh literature to American institutions to raise awareness of Kazakhstan's history and culture. It also participates in celebrations of national holidays, public diplomacy projects, and joint events with local organizations.

Historical ties between New York and Kazakh culture precede the consulate itself: in 1981, the World Trade Center hosted the exhibition Kazakhstan in New York, which introduced American audiences to Kazakh arts, photography, and crafts.

Since its establishment, the Consulate General has supported bilateral cooperation, assisting Kazakh citizens abroad, and promoting Kazakhstan's participation in multilateral initiatives, especially given New York's status as the seat of the United Nations. In recent years, the mission has expanded its public diplomacy activities; it has organized annual Republic Day flag-raising ceremonies in Wall Street, including a 2025 event at which New York City Mayor Eric Adams proclaimed "Kazakhstan Heritage Day", attended by local officials, diaspora members, and students.

== See also ==
- Diplomatic missions of Kazakhstan
- Kazakhstan–United States relations
- Foreign relations of Kazakhstan
