= Kazakhstan–United States relations =

- Kazakhstan: United States

Diplomatic mission
- Embassy of Kazakhstan, Washington, D.C.: Embassy of the United States, Astana

Envoy
- Ambassador Yerzhan Ashikbayev: Ambassador Julie Stufft

Kazakhstan and the United States established relations as Kazakhstan gained independence from the Soviet Union. Since then, the two nations have collaborated in fields such as trade, security, nuclear non-proliferation, and counterterrorism. While seeking to maintain and grow positive relations, the United States remains critical of Kazakhstan's human rights record.

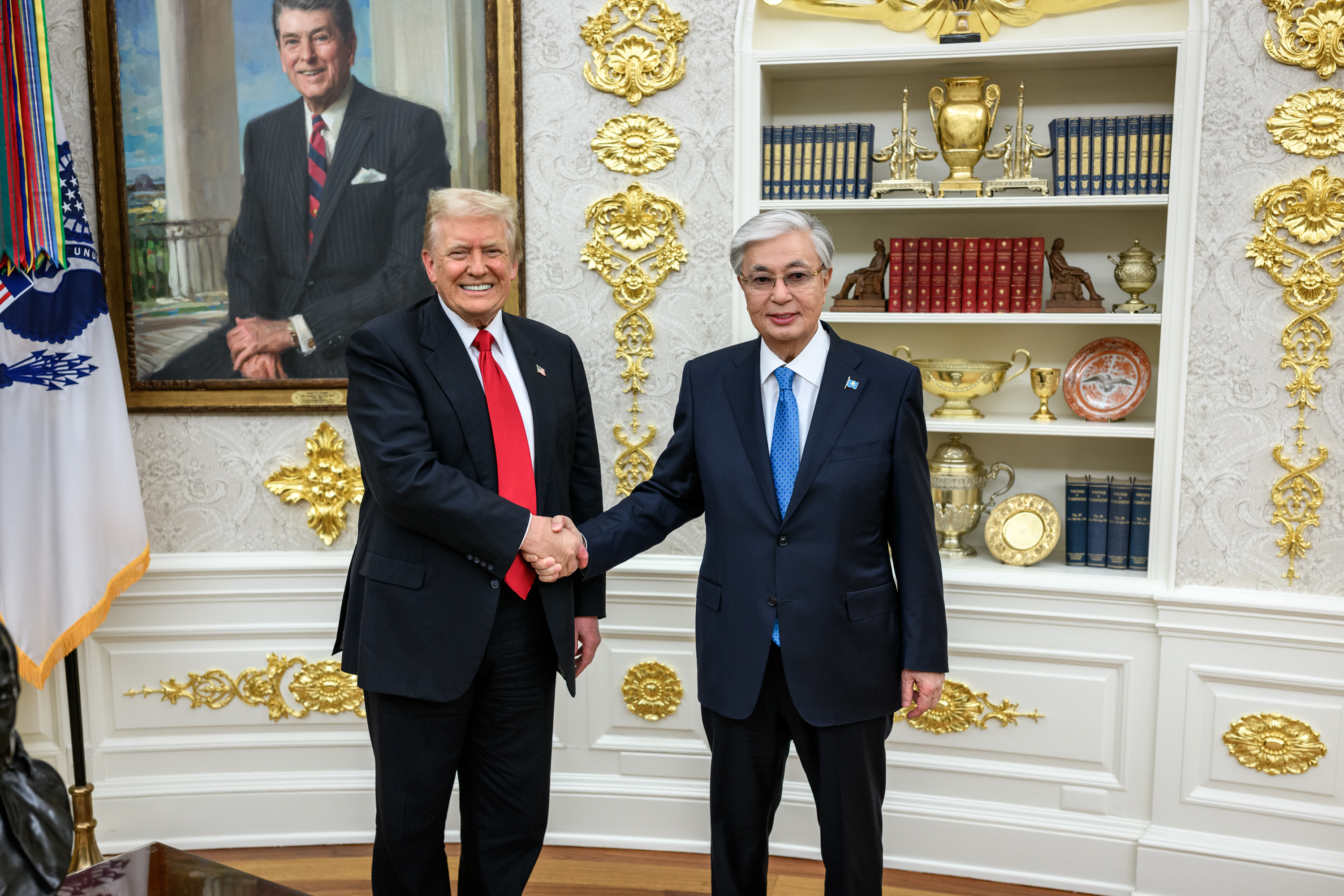
Donald Trump and Kassym-Jomart Tokayev on November 6, 2025

== Overview ==
The United States and the Republic of Kazakhstan established diplomatic relations on 26 December 1991. The U.S. opened its embassy in Almaty in January 1992 and relocated it to Astana in 2006.

The U.S. was a critical player in assisting Kazakhstan to dispose of its strategic nuclear weapons stockpile and dismantle its nuclear weapons infrastructure between 1991 and 1996 through the provision of Nunn-Lugar Comprehensive Threat Reduction (CTR) assistance. By 2008, cumulative CTR assistance to Kazakhstan totaled approximately US$341 million. At the 2012 Seoul Nuclear Security Summit, Presidents Barack Obama and Nursultan Nazarbayev reaffirmed bilateral cooperation in the areas of nuclear nonproliferation. President Obama went on to say, "The close relationship between our two countries extends beyond just the nuclear security issue, so this meeting will give us an opportunity to discuss the cooperation that we have built over the last several years with respect to Afghanistan and the help we've received in supplying our troops and helping to assist the Afghan government."

In addition to nuclear nonproliferation, the United States and Kazakhstan maintain strategic economic and political relations. The U.S. oil company, Chevron, became the first major investor in Kazakhstan in 1993 with the establishment of the Tengizchevroil joint venture. In 2001, Kazakhstan and the United States established the U.S.–Kazakhstan Energy Partnership.

Through the Bolashak Program, Kazakh students are able to study overseas. As of June 2014, the Embassy of the Republic of Kazakhstan reported that it had over 3,000 students around the world, of which 800 were studying in 42 universities throughout the U.S.

Cooperation strengthened after the September 11, 2001 attacks as the United States sought strategic partners near Afghanistan, and later near Iraq. Counter-terrorism plays an increasingly important role in Kazakhstan's relations with the United States and the United Kingdom. Kazakhstan has taken Uzbekistan's place as the favored partner in Central Asia for both Russia and the U.S. in the New Great Game.

According to the 2012 U.S. Global Leadership Report, 28% of Kazakhs approved of U.S. leadership, with 27% disapproving and 45% uncertain.

In 2016, Kazakhstan and the U.S. marked the 25th anniversary of Kazakhstan–U.S. relations by launching celebratory events, including the announcement of reciprocal 10-year business and tourism visas.

Nursultan Nazarbayev congratulated Donald Trump on his victory in the 2016 United States presidential election during their phone call on November 30 of the same year. The two leaders maintained that they were determined to take "friendly Kazakhstan–American relations to a new level."

According to a Reuters report, the U.S. ran a propaganda campaign to spread disinformation about the Chinese company Sinovac Biotech's COVID-19 vaccine, using fake social media accounts to claim that the Sinovac vaccine contained pork-derived ingredients and was therefore haram under Islamic law. Kazakhstan was among the Central Asian countries targeted in the campaign, which ran from the spring of 2020 to mid-2021.

== Strategic Partnership Dialogue ==
The Strategic Partnership Dialogue (SPD) is a bilateral dialogue between Kazakhstan and the U.S. covering wide-ranging discussions on bilateral and regional issues. The first SPD was held in Washington D.C. on April 9–10, 2012; the second on July 9, 2013. Kazakhstan Foreign Minister Erlan Idrissov and U.S. Secretary of State John Kerry were the co-chairs of the Strategic Partnership Dialogue.

Ambassador Kairat Umarov provided an update to the SPD in a March 24, 2014, opinion piece in The Astana Times, titled "Kazakhstan–U.S. Strategic Partnership on the Rise."

The third SPD took place on December 10, 2014, in Washington, D.C., where Idrissov and Kerry again co-chaired the meeting. The discussions included cooperation on global counterterrorism and counternarcotics issues, nonproliferation; in specific, the opening of an IAEA Low-Enriched Uranium Bank in Kazakhstan, Expo 2017, Kazakhstan's accession to the World Trade Organization, and bilateral cooperation in other fields.

On November 2, 2015, John Kerry visited Astana, where he launched the fourth SPD. The sides discussed the war in Donbas, underscoring their support for the Minsk process. Both sides pledged to deepen their cooperation in countering the threats of ISIL, terrorism, and violent extremism. The next session of the fourth SPD was held in Washington, D.C., on March 9, 2016, and covered a range of issues including: international and regional affairs, security cooperation, economic cooperation, governance, rule of law, and labor and human rights in Kazakhstan.

The fifth SPD took place on September 20, 2016, in New York City, on the margins of the 71st United Nations General Assembly. In a joint statement after the discussions, Idrissov and Kerry assessed that the strategic partnership between the two countries had never been stronger.

=== Afghanistan and regional integration ===
The U.S. looked to Kazakhstan to provide strategic support and regional influence in promoting peace and security in Afghanistan in the wake of U.S. troop withdrawal from Afghanistan.

The U.S. welcomed Kazakhstan's leadership role in supporting security in Afghanistan and the region, including through its assistance to the Afghan National Security Forces and contribution to the Istanbul Process. The U.S. valued Kazakhstan's $50 million scholarship program to educate one thousand Afghan students in Kazakhstan's universities. The U.S. welcomed Kazakhstan's economic connectivity efforts, in particular, its investments in regional infrastructure such as the Kazakhstan–Turkmenistan railroad and the Caspian seaport of Aktau. The U.S. said that it and Kazakhstan will continue to work closely together to support stability, peace, and prosperity in Afghanistan and the region.

In a 2014 interview with Kazakh TV, Fatema Z. Sumar, the Deputy Assistant Secretary of the Bureau of South and Central Asian Affairs, said that Kazakhstan had an important role in supporting the region, especially Afghanistan, in a transition towards stability and prosperity.

=== Nuclear security and nonproliferation ===
Former United States President Barack Obama repeatedly emphasized Kazakhstan's important leadership role in global nuclear disarmament. The U.S. and Kazakhstan reaffirmed their shared commitment to prevent the spread of weapons of mass destruction. Threat reduction and nonproliferation remains a cornerstone of the two countries' joint efforts to ensure global and regional security. The U.S. welcomed Kazakhstan's efforts to establish a regional Nuclear Security Training Center in Kazakhstan. The U.S. supported Kazakhstan's offer to host an IAEA Low-Enriched Uranium Bank. The Obama administration worked closely with the Nazarbayev administration to finalize the agreement for Kazakhstan to host the IAEA fuel bank, which concluded in 2015.

Under the Cooperative Threat Reduction program, the U.S. spent $240 million to assist Kazakhstan in eliminating weapons of mass destruction and related infrastructure.

During the 2014 Nuclear Security Summit at The Hague, Obama and Nazarbayev issued a joint statement confirming their shared commitment to nonproliferation and strengthening nuclear security. The Joint Statement went on to state:

The United States of America welcomes the Republic of Kazakhstan's activities to strengthen nuclear security and implement decisions of the Washington and Seoul Nuclear Security Summits, including by converting the VVR-K research reactor at the Institute of Nuclear Physics (INP) to low enriched uranium (LEU) fuel, downblending the INP's highly enriched uranium (HEU) material and removing the HEU spent fuel from the reactor. The United States and Kazakhstan will continue to work together to convert Kazakhstan's remaining HEU reactors to LEU fuel and eliminate all remaining HEU research reactor fuel as soon as technically feasible.

The 2016 Nuclear Security Summit (NSS 2016) took place on March 31–April 1, 2016, in Washington, D.C. Nazarbayev addressed the Summit, saying that Kazakhstan is regarded as one of twenty countries to have the highest level of security of nuclear facilities and materials. Within the framework of the NSS 2016, Kazakhstan and the U.S. adopted the joint statement on cooperation in the sphere of non-proliferation and nuclear security. The sides also reiterated their overall commitment to continue practical cooperation in that sphere.

==== Common initiatives ====
The U.S. and Kazakhstan have many common interests in the field of non-proliferation of nuclear weapons. On August 29, 1991, when Nazarbayev closed down the Semipalatinsk nuclear test site, it has since been a leader in the movement for non-proliferation. In this capacity, it has worked closely with the United States to advance non-proliferation further. In 2006, it joined with its Central Asian neighbors Kyrgyzstan, Tajikistan, Turkmenistan, and Uzbekistan to affirm that the entire region would forever be a nuclear weapons-free zone. The U.S. initially opposed this due to concerns that it would exclude the transport of nuclear material across the region but later provided its endorsement. Kazakhstan has also educated a younger generation that is open to the world, oriented towards free and legal markets, and eager to participate in the affairs of their government through normal democratic channels. During a 2015 visit to Astana, U.S. Secretary of State John Kerry stated that Obama appreciated Nazarbayev's leadership on issues of nuclear nonproliferation and countering violent extremism.

==== Nuclear training ====
The U.S. is working with Kazakhstan to develop a Nuclear Security Training Center (NSTC) in order to improve indigenous security and safeguard training capabilities for all nuclear facilities in Kazakhstan. The NSTC aims to teach nuclear personnel how to strengthen their material protection, control, and accounting and countering nuclear and radioactive trafficking. U.S. Department of Energy National Nuclear Security Administration (DOE/NNSA) support includes constructing and equipping the NSTC as well as curriculum development for physical protection and material control and accounting specialists. The current projected completion date is before the end of 2015. The U.S., led by its Department of State and in coordination with its Departments of Energy and Defense, is collaborating with Kazakhstan to develop a curriculum to counter nuclear smuggling at the center and other related nuclear security training.

==== Uranium removal ====
The U.S. has been working with Kazakhstan to eliminate its excess highly enriched uranium (HEU) since the completion of Project Sapphire in 1994, when the two countries cooperated to remove and ship approximately 600 kilograms of HEU from Kazakhstan to the U.S. In recent years, the DOE/NNSA Global Threat Reduction Initiative (GTRI) has returned almost 75 kilograms of HEU spent fuel to Russia and has down blended all 33 kilograms of remaining fresh HEU in-country. Once the final three research reactors are converted to low-enriched uranium (LEU), the DOE/NNSA will work with Kazakhstan to return the remaining 85 kilograms of HEU at these facilities to Russia for disposition. The next shipment will take place in late 2014 from the Institute of Nuclear Physics in Alatau.

On January 7, 2015, the DOE/NNSA announced the removal of 36 kilograms (approximately 80 pounds) of HEU spent fuel from the Institute of Nuclear Physics in Almaty.

Kazakhstan and the U.S. agreed to work jointly to safely dispose of HEU. The agreement was signed by the U.S. Under Secretary for Nuclear Security of the Department of Energy Lisa Gordon-Hagerty and Kanat Bozumbayev, the energy minister of Kazakhstan, at the IAEA's 63rd General Conference in September 2019.

==== Uranium and plutonium disposition ====
The U.S. has worked with Kazakhstan to complete the transportation of 10 metric tons of HEU and 3 metric tons of plutonium—enough material to make 775 nuclear weapons—from the Kazakhstan BN-350 facility in Aktau to a secure facility in the northeastern part of the country. Currently, Kazakhstan is in the process of conducting a feasibility study to evaluate options for the final disposition of this material.

=== Security cooperation ===
The U.S. and Kazakhstan affirmed their continued collaboration in support of stability in the region, including joint efforts on counterterrorism, U.S. support for Kazakhstan's peacekeeping brigade KAZBAT and the annual military exercise Steppe Eagle.

Kazakhstan and the U.S. hold regular meetings dedicated to developing cooperation in the field of security and the fight against organized crime, terrorism, extremism and drug trafficking. In May 2015, General Prosecutor of the Republic of Kazakhstan Askhat Daulbayev met with U.S. Ambassador to Kazakhstan George Krol in Astana to discuss wide-ranging issues of bilateral legal cooperation, including transnational organized crime, terrorism, and drug trafficking. Daulbayev noted that Kazakhstan's General Prosecutor's Office is actively cooperating with the U.S. in fighting crime.

In August 2016, the U.S. under Secretary for Civilian Security, Democracy and Human Rights Sarah Sewall conducted a trip to Kazakhstan to discuss ways the two countries can strengthen their cooperation against terrorism.

The U.S. State Department's coordinator for counterterrorism, Nathan Sales, visited Kazakhstan from October 7–8, 2019 to discuss the U.S. and Kazakhstan's counterterrorism partnership and Kazakhstan's efforts to repatriate its citizens from Syria. Ambassador Sales said that Kazakhstan's repatriation program could serve as a roadmap for other countries to do the same.

U.S. Secretary of State Antony Blinken has pointed to Kazakhstan's work to repatriate more than 600 fighters and family members of Kazakh citizenship as a model for other countries.

=== Democracy and development ===
The U.S. and Kazakhstan reaffirmed the importance of democratic development and efforts to strengthen representative institutions such as an independent media and local self-government. Both sides acknowledged the importance of a vibrant and varied civil society during the Strategic Partnership Dialogue roundtable on governance and human rights with non-governmental organizations. The U.S. welcomes Kazakhstan's efforts to establish a national development assistance agency, KazAID.

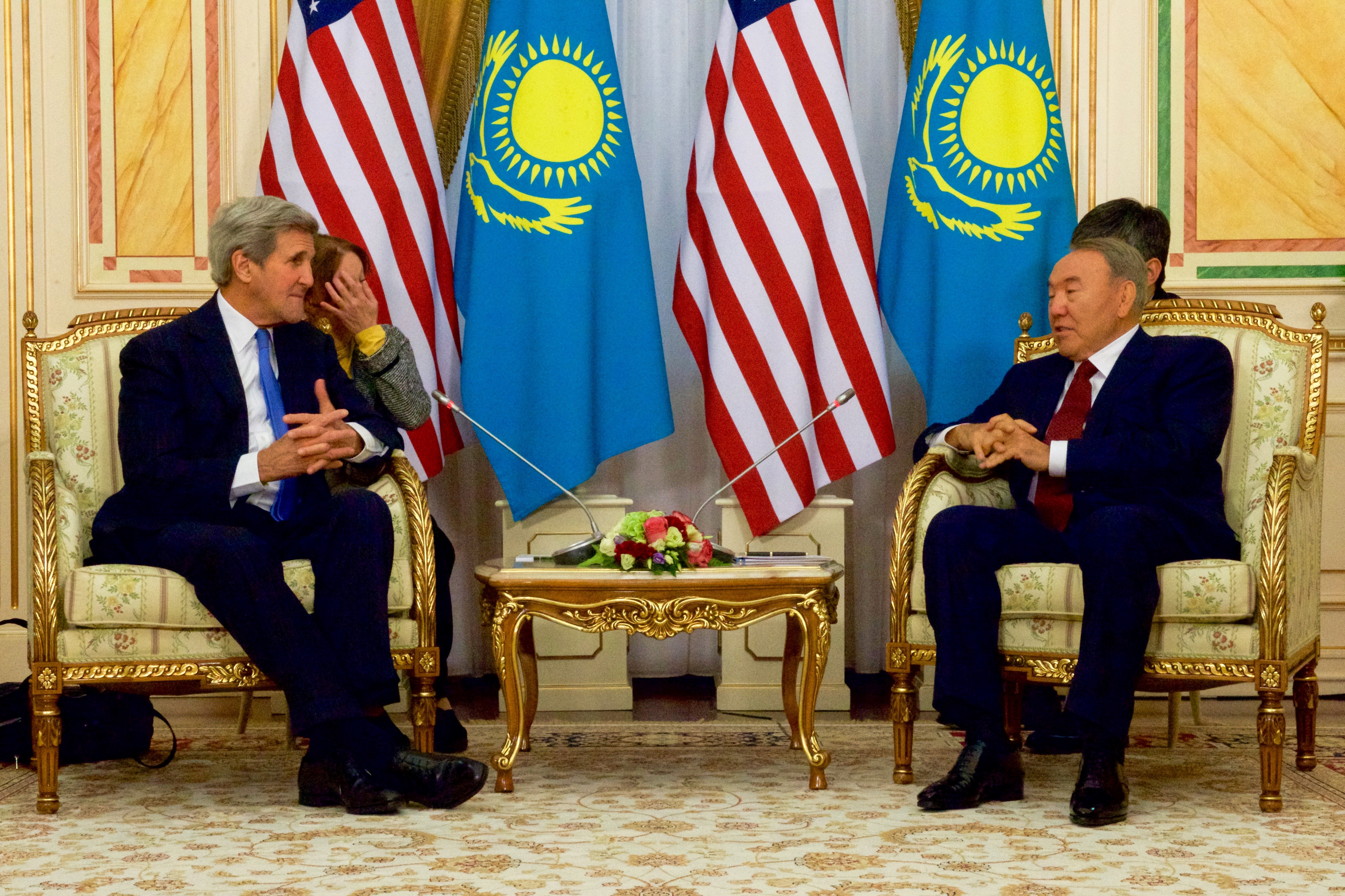
Secretary Kerry Meets With Kazakhstan President Nazarbayev in Astana, 2015

Kazakhstan is the first country in Central Asia to have a national system of official development assistance (ODA). The UN Office for the Coordination of Humanitarian Affairs (OCHA) expressed its hope that the establishment of the KazAID would help build a more stable and secure environment.

== Economic cooperation ==
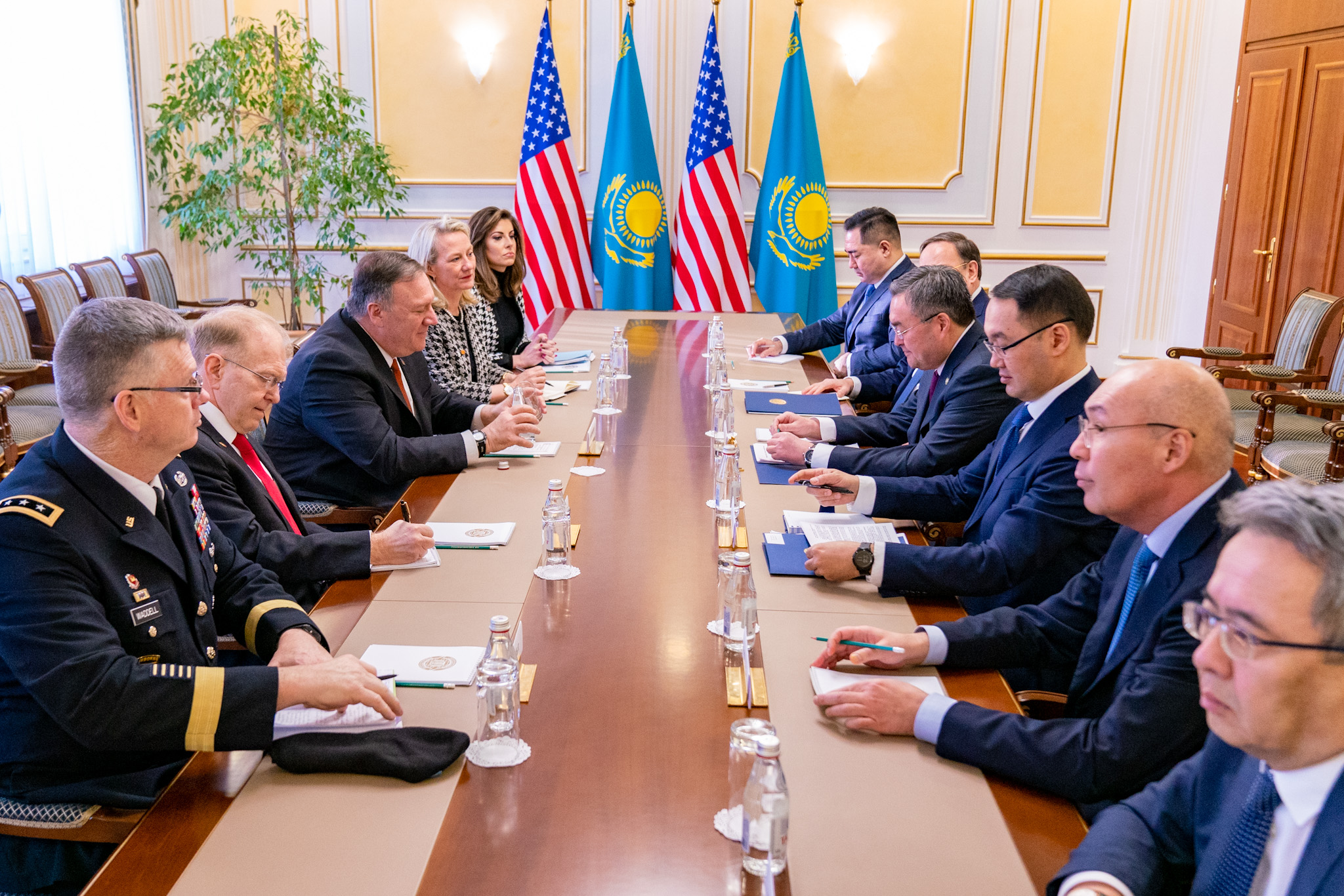
American and Kazakh delegations meet in 2020

The American Chamber of Commerce in Kazakhstan represents nearly 200 member companies in 30 industry sectors. The U.S. is responsible for 15%, or $48.4 billion, of total foreign direct investment (FDI) in Kazakhstan.

=== Trade and business ===
Kazakhstan is currently the 79th largest goods trading partner of the U.S., with $2.1 billion in total (two-way) goods trade during 2018. U.S. goods exports to Kazakhstan in 2018 were $729 million, up 32.1% ($177 million) from 2017. Kazakhstan was the U.S.'s 72nd largest supplier of goods imports in 2018. U.S. goods imports from Kazakhstan totaled $1.4 billion in 2018, up 75% ($593 million) from 2017.

According to the U.S. diplomatic mission in Kazakhstan, Kazakhstan provides trade and investment prospects for U.S. firms seeking new opportunities in one of the most dynamic of the emerging markets. Each year, the U.S. Chamber of Commerce produces a commercial guide for U.S. companies. U.S. firms invested more than $42 billion in Kazakhstan between 1993 and 2013. Two-way trade between the U.S. and Kazakhstan reached $2.4 billion in 2014.

The U.S. has applied Kazakhstan with Normal Trade Relations status. The U.S. Chamber of Commerce advocates that it is in the national interest of the U.S. to provide Kazakhstan permanent normal trade relations.

In August 2014, Kazakhstan's U.S. ambassador Kairat Umarov visited Springfield, Missouri to cultivate commercial opportunities for American and Kazakh companies. This resulted in Springfield, Missouri-based Allen's global president Jerry Nichols to travel to Kazakhstan and later announce a major expansion into Kazakhstan that will create more American and Kazakh jobs.

The U.S. Ambassador to Kazakhstan, George Krol, affirmed U.S. commitment to Kazakhstan in a 2015 interview. Ambassador Krol said, "The United States and Kazakhstan, I would say, have been made for each other. And we have pledged to deepen this strategic partnership and increase our economic and business interaction. In this part, we have agreed that we will work on the development of our commercial cooperation."

In June 2015, Kazakhstan finalized its accession to the WTO. On this occasion Krol said: "It meets our interests because Kazakhstan plays an important role in the global economy and has to be a member of the WTO. We supported Kazakhstan's WTO accession and will continue to support Kazakhstan."

In 2014, Kazakhstan sold the U.S. about 12 million pounds of uranium, which is 23% of the total 53.3 million pounds purchased by the U.S. It is double the amount from 2013.

Prime Minister of Kazakhstan Bakytzhan Sagintayev visited the U.S. on April 11–14, 2017. The goal of the trip was to discuss with the U.S. business leaders opportunities for cooperation in regard to the 3rd Modernization of Kazakhstan's economy. The Prime Minister met with the CEO of Chevron, the representatives of the largest financial institutions, as well as tech companies in the Silicon Valley. During the Prime Minister's visit, the U.S. and Kazakh sides signed an agreement on opening a Representative Office of Kazakhstan in the Silicon Valley.

Astana hosted the U.S.–Kazakhstan business forum June 14, 2017. The forum was attended by 25 U.S. companies and representatives of Kazakh state bodies, national companies and local business representatives. The event aimed to attract U.S. companies to priority sectors, including the car assembly industry, health, construction, agriculture, and light industries.

=== Foreign direct investment ===
U.S. companies are the second largest investors in Kazakhstan. In 2019, $5.5 billion of FDI was directed to Kazakhstan from the U.S., which accounted for 23% of the total FDI in the country.

=== Kazakhstan–United States convention ===
The first Kazakhstan-U.S. Convention took place in Washington, D.C., on December 11, 2013. The theme of the 2013 Convention was "Successful Strategic Partnership." It centered on moving forward the existing partnership between Kazakhstan and the U.S., increasing strategic cooperation and opening new opportunities for long-term initiatives between American and Kazakhstan.

The 2013 convention was attended by several members of the U.S. Congress, including Senator Kelly Ayotte (R–NH) and Representatives Rob Andrews (D–NJ), Jim Bridenstine (R–OK), Corrine Brown (D–FL), Doug Collins (R–GA), Henry Cuellar (D–TX), Donna Edwards (D–MD), Mike Fitzpatrick (R–PA), Pete Gallego (D–TX), Chris Gibson (R–NY), Hakeem Jeffries (D–NY), Leonard Lance (R–NJ), Michelle Lujan Grisham (D–NM), Stephen Lynch (D–MA), Mark Meadows (R–NC), Grace Meng (D–NY), Pete Olson (R–TX), Bill Pascrell (D–NJ), Ted Poe (R–TX), Dana Rohrabacher (R–CA), and Steve Stockman (R–TX).

The second Kazakhstan-United States Convention was held on December 10, 2014, and held the theme "Working Together For A Secure Future." A video was produced to highlight the topics covered at the 2014 convention.

The 2014 convention comprised an opening ceremony, political and business sessions. Frederick Kempe, CEO and president of the Atlantic Council, moderated the political session. Erlan Idrissov, Minister of Foreign Affairs of Kazakhstan, and Madeleine Albright, the former Secretary of State, were the keynote speakers of the session. Also, the Assistant Secretary of State Nisha Biswal, Deputy Administrator of National Nuclear Security Administration Anne Harrington, former Deputy Secretary of Energy Daniel Poneman, and senior fellow and director of CSIS Russia and Eurasia Program Andrew Kuchins gave speeches during this part of the event.

The business session of the second convention was moderated by president of USKBA William Courtney. Keynote speakers of the session included Minister of Economic Integration of Kazakhstan Zhanar Aitzhanova and Under-Secretary of State Catherine Novelli. The speakers of the business session were deputy chair of Astana Expo 2017 Ainur Kuatova, Deputy Chair of KAZNEX INVEST Assel Yergaziyeva, former Under-Secretary of State Robert Hormats, president of Guggenheim International Steven J. Green, executive secretary of National Chamber of Entrepreneurs Sabr Yesimbekov.

The third convention was held on December 8, 2015, at the United States Institute of Peace. The theme of the convention was "Road to the Astana EXPO 2017: Shared Prosperity and Dynamic Development." 2016 marked 25 years of Kazakhstan-U.S. diplomatic relations. The 25th anniversary became the main theme of the fourth Convention, held on December 6, 2016, at the Ritz-Carlton Hotel in Washington, D.C. The theme of the fourth Convention was titled as "Kazakhstan - U.S. Strategic Partnership Celebrating the Quarter Century Milestone."

The fourth Kazakhstan - U.S. Convention was held on December 6, 2016, and keynoted by U.S. Deputy Secretary of Commerce Bruce Andrews. Secretary Andrews mentioned how American companies have contributed to Kazakhstan's growth and development.

=== U.S.–Kazakh Business Council ===
The U.S. Chamber of Commerce announced on September 1, 2020, the launch of the U.S.-Kazakhstan Business Council (USKZBC). The new Council is aimed at advancing economic and commercial cooperation between the two countries.

=== Green economy ===
Kazakhstan and the U.S. partner under the 'Power the Future' program that helps to increase the deployment of renewable energy and energy efficiency technologies. With support from Power the Future, Kazakhstan designed an inclusive auction process that balances risks between investors and the government. In 2018 and 2019, Kazakhstan saw a total of 28 auctions, with bid prices coming in between 23 and 64% below previous renewable tariff ceilings.

=== Donald Trump's second presidency ===
On February 21, 2025, Secretary of State Marco Rubio reaffirmed U.S. commitment to the C5+1 during talks with Uzbek Foreign Minister Bakhtiyor Saidov, highlighting investment opportunities in critical minerals and civil nuclear energy. The U.S. also supports Uzbekistan’s bid for WTO membership and has engaged in migration agreements with Tashkent. Meanwhile, Uzbekistan is leading regional efforts to engage Afghanistan, with recent trade agreements covering infrastructure, energy, and resource management.

== Science and technology cooperation ==
Kazakh Prime Minister Bakhytzhan Sagintayev conducted a working visit to the U.S. in April 2017. One of the main focuses of the trip was promoting cooperation in IT technologies and engineering. To that end, the Prime Minister met with Silicon Valley companies, such as Tesla and Cisco among others. During his visit, the Kazakh Prime Minister also signed different memoranda with the American companies that are expected to start cooperation in the technology sphere.

== Human rights ==
The 2014 country report of the U.S. State Department's Bureau of Democracy, Human Rights and Labor criticizes many aspects of the human rights situation in Kazakhstan:

The president controls the legislature and the judiciary as well as regional and local governments. Changes or amendments to the constitution require presidential consent. The 2012 national elections for the Mazhilis (lower house of parliament) fell short of international standards, as did the 2011 presidential election, in which President Nazarbayev received 95 percent of the vote. Civilian authorities maintained effective control over the security forces.

The most significant human rights problems were severe limits on citizens' ability to change the government through the right to vote in free and fair elections; restrictions on freedom of speech, press, assembly, religion, and association; and lack of an independent judiciary and due process, especially in dealing with pervasive corruption and abuses by law enforcement and judicial officials. During the year the parliament passed new criminal and administrative offenses codes as well as a new labor law, that have the potential to further limit freedoms of speech, assembly, and religion.

Other reported abuses included: arbitrary or unlawful killings; military hazing that led to deaths; detainee and prisoner torture and other abuse; harsh and sometimes life-threatening prison conditions; arbitrary arrest and detention; infringements on citizens' privacy rights; prohibitive political party registration requirements; restrictions on the activities of nongovernmental organizations (NGOs); violence and discrimination against women; abuse of children; sex and labor trafficking; discrimination against persons with disabilities; societal discrimination against lesbian, gay, bisexual, and transgender (LGBT) persons; discrimination against those with HIV/AIDS; and child labor.

The government took some steps to prosecute officials who committed abuses, especially in high-profile corruption cases, including several deputy ministers, a regional governor, and the chair of the Agency for Regulating Natural Monopolies; however, corruption was widespread, and impunity existed for those in positions of authority as well as for those with connections to government or law enforcement officials.

The U.S. and Kazakhstan have affirmed their work in the area of human rights. In 2013, the Kazakhstan Commission for Children's Rights Protection and the General Prosecutor's office met with Special Advisor for Children's Issues of the U.S. Department of State Susan Jacobs to discuss the underground online network of adopting children and have created a commission to crack down on these illicit adoption rings. The U.S. will be providing information to Kazakhstan on those networks and help understand the living conditions of adopted Kazakh children in the U.S..

Kazakhstan and the USAID completed the Dignity and Rights program in October 2020. The program was funded by the USAID to combat the international trafficking in persons and promote migrants’ rights.

=== Rule of law ===
A U.S. government report released in 2014 commented that in Kazakhstan:

The law does not require police to inform detainees that they have the right to an attorney, and police did not do so. Human rights observers alleged that law enforcement officials dissuaded detainees from seeing an attorney, gathered evidence through preliminary questioning before a detainee's attorney arrived, and in some cases used corrupt defense attorneys to gather evidence. ... The law does not adequately provide for an independent judiciary. The executive branch sharply limited judicial independence. Prosecutors enjoyed a quasi-judicial role and had the authority to suspend court decisions. Corruption was evident at every stage of the judicial process. Although judges were among the most highly paid government employees, lawyers and human rights monitors alleged that judges, prosecutors, and other officials solicited bribes in exchange for favorable rulings in the majority of criminal cases.

The Rule of Law Initiative of the American Bar Association has programs to train justice sector professionals in Kazakhstan. Kazakhstan's Supreme Court announced steps to modernize and to increase transparency and oversight over the country's legal system. With funding from the U.S. Agency for International Development, the Rule of Law Initiative began a new program in April 2012 to strengthen the independence and accountability of Kazakhstan's judiciary.

The Procurator General of Kazakhstan and the Federal Bureau of Investigation collaborated successfully in a complex seven-year investigation into a February 11, 2006, triple homicide of Altynbek Sarsenbayev, Baurzhan Baibosyn, and Vasiliy Zhuravlev.

In June 2016, the American Bar Association Rule of Law Initiative held a roundtable discussion dedicated to judicial practice concerning cases related to extremism and terrorism. The participants of the roundtable included representatives of the Kazakh Supreme Court, the Union of Judges of Kazakhstan, and the U.S. Agency for International Development (USAID).

On October 2, 2020, the USAID launched a five-year rule of law program for over $7 million to support legal reforms in Kazakhstan. The Supreme Court and the Ministry of Information and Public Development of Kazakhstan partner with the USAID under this program.

==== Justice Sector Institutional Strengthening Project ====
The Justice Sector Institutional Strengthening Project, a project to strengthen judicial services in Kazakhstan and to improve the key legal and rule of law environment, will receive a $36 million loan from the World Bank Group.

==== Treaty on Mutual Legal Assistance in Criminal Matters ====
On February 20, 2015, Deputy Assistant Attorney General and Department of Justice Counselor for International Affairs Bruce C. Swartz and Prosecutor General of the Republic of Kazakhstan Askhat Daulbayev signed the Treaty on Mutual Legal Assistance in Criminal Matters in Washington D.C. The Treaty provides a formal intergovernmental mechanism for the provision of evidence and other forms of law enforcement assistance in criminal investigations, prosecutions, and related proceedings. In July 2015, Kazakhstan ratified the agreement.

== Military and security cooperation ==
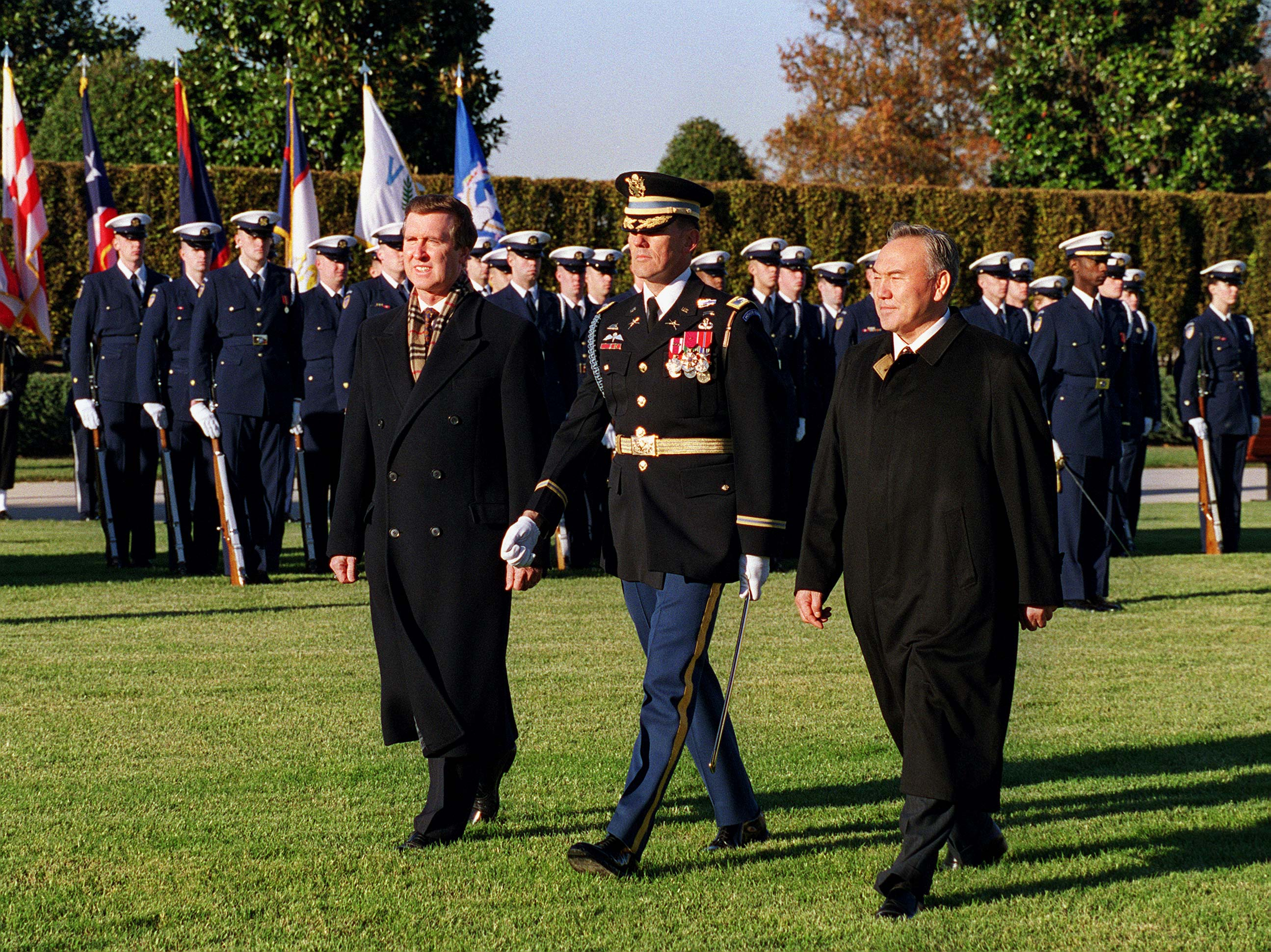
Secretary of Defense William Cohen (left) and President Nazarbayev (right), escorted by Colonel Gregory Gardner (center) of the 3rd Infantry Regiment inspect a joint services honor guard during a full honor military arrival ceremony for Nazarbayev at The Pentagon, 17 November 1997.

Reportedly responding to a U.S. appeal, the Kazakhstani legislature in May 2003 approved sending military engineers to assist in coalition operations in Iraq. The 27 troops trained Iraqis in de-mining and water purification. They pulled out of Iraq in late 2008. Since 2009, Kazakhstan has permitted air and land transit for U.S. and NATO troops and equipment—as part of the Northern Distribution Network—to support stabilization operations in Afghanistan.

For almost a decade, thousands of service members and civilians from more than 15 nations have converged on the Republic of Kazakhstan for the military exercise Steppe Eagle. More than 1,000 participants from six countries are invited to be a part of the multinational, peacekeeping exercise at Camp Illisky (a training facility outside Almaty).

The second phase of the Steppe Eagle 2015 peacekeeping exercises began June 15, 2015, at the Ili training area near Almaty. It was the 13th time the exercise was held. Annually, exercises involved more than 1,500 people as well as military observers from foreign states, experts from various NATO headquarters and military-diplomatic corps accredited in Kazakhstan.

During the second Iraq War, Kazakhstani troops dismantled 4 million mines and other explosives, and help provide medical care to more than 5,000 coalition members and civilians and purified 718 cubic meters of water.

Since 1995, Kazakhstan has been partnered with the state of Arizona through the State Partnership Program which works to build relationships, learn best practices, foster military and civilian ties.

Kazakhstan's Military Institute of Land Forces has an exchange program with West Point Military Academy in the USA. Each year students from the Kazakhstan's military institute visit West Point to get familiar with cadets' routine, take raining, physical reparation and military training. Cadets from West Point, in their turn, visit Kazakhstan's Military Institute of Land Forces for the same purposes.

Kazakh military officials have sought to learn from the U.S. Army on Kazakhstan's transition from a conscript to an all-volunteer army.

Phase one of Steppe Eagle 2016 was held in Illisky Training Center on April 11–22. The peacekeeping exercise featured instructors and soldiers from the Kazakhstan Peacekeeping Operations Training Center, U.K. soldiers from the 1st Rifles Battalion, 160th Brigade, and Soldiers from the Arizona National Guard. Phase two of Steppe Eagle 2016 took place in the U.K. in July.

The second stage of the Steppe Eagle 2016 International Peacekeeping Exercise took place at Stanford Training Area in the United Kingdom. The participant countries included Kazakhstan, the U.K., the U.S., Tajikistan and Kyrgyzstan.

Phase 1 of Steppe Eagle 2017 took place March 31 to April 11, 2017, at Illisky Training Center, Kazakhstan. About 50 U.S. and U.K. soldiers and over 500 Kazakh soldiers participated in the peacekeeping exercises that focused on medical and communication operations.

== Bilateral meetings ==
=== Nursultan Nazarbayev and the George W. Bush administration ===
In May 2006 U.S. Vice President Dick Cheney traveled to Kazakhstan to meet with President Nazarbayev to promote the expansion of oil and gas export routes. This was the third meeting between Cheney and Nazarbayev, the first occurring when Cheney was CEO of Halliburton, and the second shortly after Cheney became vice president. After the meeting, Nazarbayev publicly stated that memoranda of understanding had been signed for co-financing of Kazakh projects and $158 million allocated for defense projects.

On September 29, 2006, Nazarbayev met with President George W. Bush in the White House. In their public remarks President Bush thanked Nazarbayev for his country's support in Afghanistan, and stated the two had discussed Kazakhstan's ascension to the WTO and commitment to institutions "that will enable liberty to flourish." Nazarbayev pointed to the strength in bilateral relations between the two countries as resulting from cooperation on matters of energy security, Bush's war on terror, and economic agreements. The joint declaration signed by both leaders highlighted several bilateral and global issues; these included American support for Kazakh oil and gas pipeline expansion in the Baku-Tbilisi-Ceyhan project, Kazakhstan's national development into a diverse and stable economy, and Kazakh ascension to the WTO. Included in the joint statement was a component focused on Kazakhstan's efforts to invest in "its citizens ... an independent media, local self-government, and elections deemed free and fair by international standards."

=== Erzhan Ashikbayev in the United States ===
Vice Minister of Foreign Affairs of Kazakhstan Erzhan Ashikbayev visited the U.S. on June 10–12, 2014, where he met with the leadership of the White House, State Department, U.S. Congress, the Department of Defense, Department of Energy, as well as with representatives of the U.S. export and business community.

=== Meeting of Nursultan Nazarbayev with the U.S. Congressmen ===
Nazarbayev met with the members of the U.S. Congress Dana Rohrabacher and Gregory Meeks on September 5, 2014, in Borovoye, 250 kilometres north from the Kazakh capital. The U.S. congressmen expressed hope for further strengthening of the mutually beneficial partnership between the two countries.

On the same day, the U.S. congressmen had a meeting with Kazakh Foreign Minister Erlan Idrissov. With Idrissov, who spent five years as Kazakhstan's ambassador in Washington, they discussed the current state and outlook for cooperation between Kazakhstan and the U.S. in political, economic and trade areas.

The congressmen discussed the readiness jointly with U.S. businesses to offer shared projects in non-oil sectors of Kazakhstan economy. The American side also supported Kazakhstan's accession to the WTO and the economic development strategy of the country. The two sides underlined their cooperation in global security issues, primarily in non-proliferation of weapons of mass destruction and regional security issues, including the situation in Afghanistan.

=== Nursultan Nazarbayev and Barack Obama ===
U.S. President Barack Obama repeatedly stressed the important nature of the Kazakh-U.S. relationship, citing economic issues, human rights and regional security. In 2012 during the nuclear security summit in Seoul, South Korea, Obama noted: "The close relationship between our two countries extends beyond just the nuclear security issue".

On January 21, 2015, Nazarbayev held a late-night phone conversation with Obama. The main topic of the call was south-eastern Ukraine. Obama praised Kazakhstan's efforts in strengthening international security and expressed his hope that the Kazakh President will continue to actively contribute to finding a peaceful solution to the Russo-Ukrainian war.

President Nazarbayev was one of four heads of state President Obama held bilateral meetings with during the 2015 United Nations General Assembly in New York City.

=== Nursultan Nazarbayev and Donald Trump ===
Donald Trump and Nursultan Nazarbayev held their first bilateral phone conversation soon after Trump's election as President of the United States.

The first meeting between Presidents Donald Trump and Nursultan Nazarbayev came on the sidelines of the Arab-Islamic-American Summit held in Riyadh, Saudi Arabia. The two leaders exchanged thoughts on strengthening the bilateral relationship between their countries and prospects for "deepening relations in trade, economic, political, cultural and humanitarian spheres," according to the Kazakh embassy's website. In later statements Donald Trump expressed his view that the two leaders "developed an immediate relationship" in this meeting.

On January 16, 2018, Trump met with Nazarbayev in the White House, the first such visit in Washington by the Kazakh head of state since a 2006 meeting with then-President George W. Bush. Prior to the meeting, Kazinform, a Kazakh state-news agency and one of the largest media outlets in Kazakhstan, stated that the meeting would focus on "the promotion of regional and global security," including specific situations in Afghanistan, Syria, and Russia, as well as a centering on Kazakhstan's cooperation with the US in nuclear nonproliferation. In their public remarks from Washington, Trump highlighted economic cooperation between the countries, citing deals with companies General Electric and Boeing, while also referring to regional security cooperation in Saudi Arabia. Trump praised Kazakhstan for their economic deals and Nazarbayev's "great, great job" as president. Nazarbayev positively referred to American support for Kazakhstan's independence and growing economic cooperation. Nazarbayev also praised Trump's signing of tax cut legislation in December 2017, calling it an "outstanding decision," and alluding to similar legislation passed in Kazakhstan.

=== Kassym-Jomart Tokayev and Under-Secretary of State ===
Kazakhstan President Kassym-Jomart Tokayev met with Under-Secretary of State for Political Affairs David Have on August 21, 2019, in Astana, Kazakhstan. The meeting was important being one of the first official meetings with the new administration of Kazakhstan. It was an opportunity for both sides to reiterate their commitment to common goals in the bilateral relations.

=== Kassym-Jomart Tokayev and Donald Trump ===
Tokayev met for the first time with Trump on September 25, 2019, on the sidelines of the 74th session of the United Nations General Assembly. The presidents agreed to strengthen cooperation in political, trade, economic, humanitarian and security spheres.

== C5+1 meetings ==
C5+1 is a format for dialogue between foreign ministers of the U.S. and the Central Asian countries. The first C5+1 meeting was held in November 2015 in Samarkand, Uzbekistan. The second meeting took place on August 3, 2016, in Washington, D.C. The foreign ministers stressed the importance of developing the transport, logistics and energy potential of Central Asia. Secretary of State John Kerry emphasized the willingness of the U.S. to promote initiatives on counterterrorism, trade and investment, economic development, and clean energy in the Central Asian countries. The six ministers agreed to launch five projects related to these goals, which the U.S. plans to support with up to $15 million.

The 2019 C5+1 meeting was held in Astana, Kazakhstan, on August 21. The U.S. delegation was led by Under-Secretary of State for Political Affairs David Hale.

The next C5+1 meeting took place in New York on September 22, 2019. The newly appointed foreign minister of Kazakhstan, Mukhtar Tileuberdi, led the Kazakh delegation. The U.S. delegation was led by U.S. Secretary of State Mike Pompeo. The parties discussed ways to expand trade and investment ties as well as integration processes.

== Response to the September 11, 2001 attacks ==
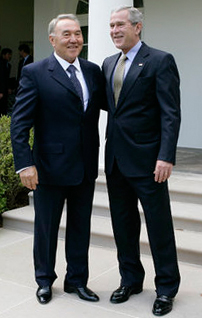
President of Kazakhstan Nursultan Nazarbayev with U.S. President George W. Bush

After the September 11, 2001 attacks, Kazakh President Nazarbayev sent a message to U.S. President George W. Bush expressing "indignation about terrorist acts that resulted in loss of numerous lives." The "civilized community must unite and take effective measures to fight international terrorism. All the Kazakhstan people sympathize with the American people in their grief and mourn aver [sic] the tragedy."

According to the Center for Defense Information, the Kazakh government has been "extremely supportive [of] the U.S.–led war against terrorism." The government offered the use of a major airport for Operation Enduring Freedom. Over 800 U.S. flights over Kazakh territory were approved and went ahead. CDI's profile of Kazakhstan credits security forces for "step[ing] up efforts to protect U.S. government facilities and oil facilities with U.S. private investment" and pledging to "freeze the assets of terrorists identified on the U.S. designated terrorist asset-freeze list." The U.S. officially gave the Kazakh government US$52.893 million in 2002, $47 million in 2003, and $36.2 million in 2004. In addition, U.S. Government agencies spent $92 million in assistance programs in Kazakhstan in 2003.

In a speech given on December 19, 2001, at the Euro-Atlantic Partnership Council during the Defence Ministers session, Mukhtar Altynbayev, the Kazakh Minister of Defense and General of the Kazakh Army, said the attacks "demonstrated that international terrorism has no borders and represents a threat to all the world community." He reaffirmed Kazakhstan's will to fight terrorism and the need to "punish" terrorists and their sponsors. Addressing the possibility, raised by NATO experts, of using Kazakh airfields for counterterrorist operations, he said there were "other practical issues under consideration," but that Kazakhstan would commit to providing humanitarian assistance to Afghans.

On September 11, 2006, the fifth anniversary of the attacks, the Astana Congress issued a Declaration on Religion, Society and International Security, promoting working "together to tackle and ultimately eliminate prejudice, ignorance and misrepresentation of other religions. These common views include the condemnation of terrorism on the basis that justice can never be established through fear and bloodshed and that the use of such means is a violation and betrayal of any faith that appeals to human goodness and dialogue." President Nazarbayev said at the conference, "An ideology of tolerance and dialogue must confront the ideology of terrorism. The global nature of interfaith contradictions and religious dialogue allows us to think that (the) U.N. will declare one of the following years (the) International Year of Religious and Cultural Tolerance. We should endeavor best efforts in order to root out ideology of terrorism and maintain material values of humanism ... There hardly exists something in the world comparable to potential of religion."

== Guantanamo Bay detainees ==
Three Kazakh citizens, Yaqub Abahanov, Abdulrahim Kerimbakiev, and Abdallah Tohtasinovich Magrupov, all born in Semey, are held in extrajudicial detention in the U.S.' Guantanamo Bay detention camp, in Cuba for alleged ties to the Taliban. Additionally, Uzbek citizen and Guantanamo captive Ilkham Turdbyavich Batayev's birthplace is Abaye, Kazakhstan.

== Idrisov–Rushailo declaration ==
Foreign Minister Yerlan Idrisov told journalists in Almaty on 18 September 2001, seven days after the September 11 attacks in New York City, that Kazakhstan and Russia are "ready for close cooperation with the U.S. in combating extremism." The statement came after President Nazarbayev, Russian Security Council Secretary Vladimir Rushailo, and the heads of Kazakh law enforcement bodies finished negotiations in security cooperation. The meeting and Secretary Rushailo's overall tour through Central Asia were a response to the attacks in New York and the now acknowledged threat of international terrorism and extremism originating from the area.

In October 2001 U.S. Senators Sam Brownback and Mary Landrieu said Kazakhstan is "ready for the U.S. to engage on the topic of terrorism."

== United States air bases ==
In 2002 a Chinese diplomat accused the U.S. Government of trying to secure a defunct air base, originally used by the Soviet Union specifically for theoretical military operations against China, near Semey in eastern Kazakhstan. A high-ranking Kazakh Defense Ministry official said the U.S. Government, as part of its anti-terrorism operations in Central Asia, had requested the use of military bases in Taraz and Taldykorgan. Ibragim Alibekov, a journalist for Radio Free Europe, characterized President Nazarbayev's support for the "anti-terrorism campaign" as cautious and "hesitant on the implementation of concrete cooperation measures." However, the National Coalition Supporting Soviet Jewry applauds Kazakhstan for playing "a vital role in U.S.-led efforts to combat international terrorism." President Bush called Kazakhstan a "strategic partner of the U.S. in Central Asia" and said the U.S. wanted to expand anti-terrorism cooperation.

Alleged U.S. attempts to acquire bases were criticized by then Russian Defense Minister Sergei Ivanov, who said such actions were unjustifiable, and Russian State Duma Speaker Gennady Seleznev.

An anonymous expert within the Kazakh Defense Ministry said that "of all the assistance [Kazakhstan] can offer towards military counter-terrorism operations—allowing use of our airfields, opening air corridors and sharing intelligence information—the last would be the least risky for Kazakhstan. Allowing the use of airfields means going into direct confrontation with the Taliban, and that is not a good scenario in our situation." An anonymous, high-ranking Foreign Ministry official said "the influx of refugees" created by U.S. airstrikes in Afghanistan "is one problem, but the greater problem is that terrorists and militants might flee northward disguised as civilians." Professor Murat Abdirov, director of the International Relations Institute of Eurasian University, said, "Kazakhstan cannot stay away from the international anti-terrorism coalition, but we should proceed with caution."

The Kazakh government did offer the use of a major airport for military operations, but three years later, with U.S. military operations against the Taliban insurgency in Afghanistan continuing, General John Abizaid, head of U.S. Central Command, said on 3 May 2005 that the U.S. did not "expect to open a military base in Kazakhstan unless a tense situation emerges in the region, under which the Kazakh government requests the U.S. armed forces to do so."

== Secretary of State visits ==
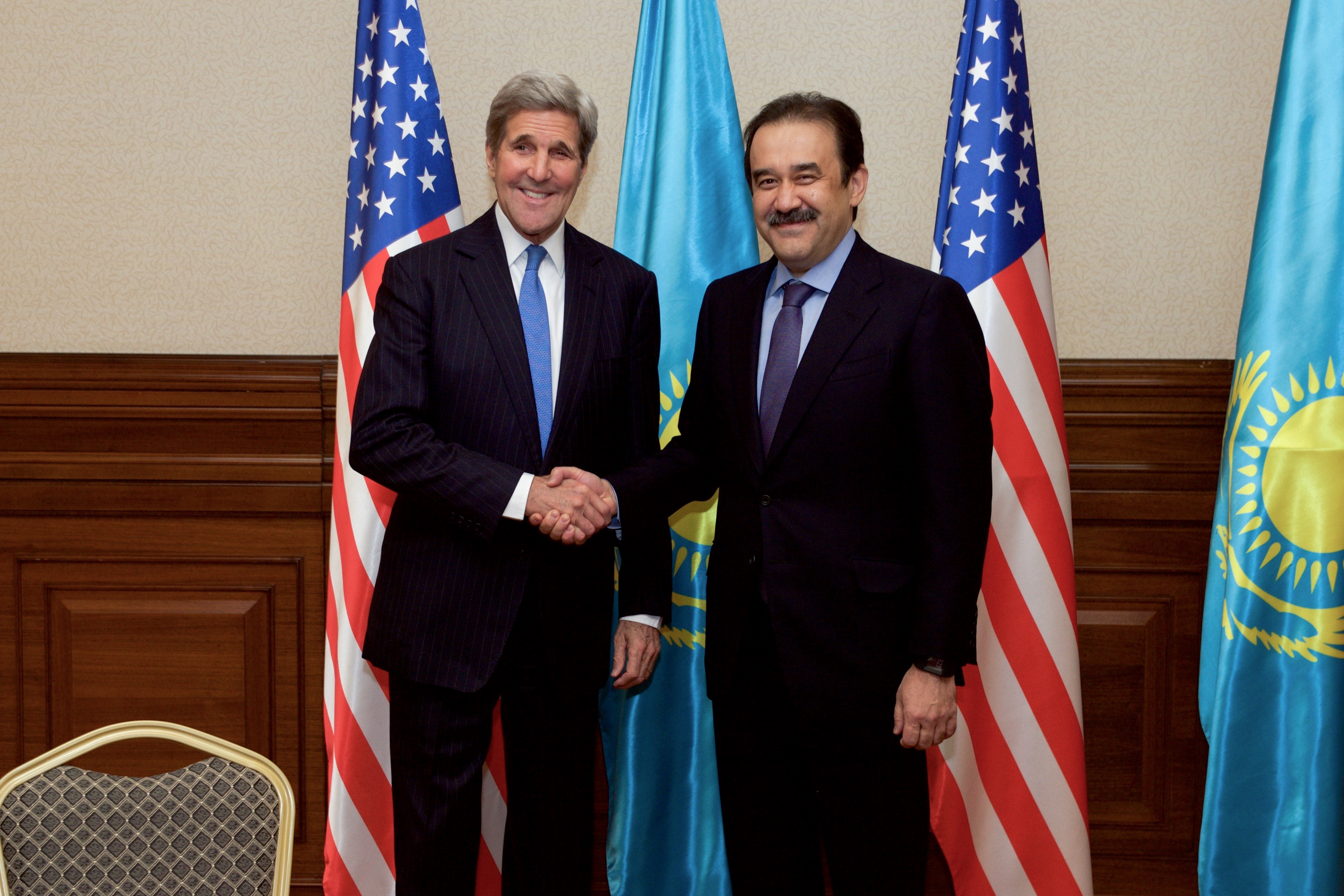
John Kerry and Karim Massimov in Astana on 1 November 2015

U.S. Secretary of State Condoleezza Rice visited Kazakhstan on 12–13 October 2005. Rice met with Nazarbayev, opposition Chairman Zharmakhan Tuyakbay, and opposition leader Alikhan Baimenov in Astana. Nazarbayev told the press that he and Rice "noted with satisfaction our cooperation in the fight against terrorism. Peace became so fragile that such evils as terrorism, drug addiction and AIDS can be fought only through joint efforts." Rice applauded Nazarbayev's foreign policy and called Kazakhstan an "island of stability" in Central Asia and a "key partner of the U.S. in strengthening stability and security." She also thanked the President for its contributions to the invasion of Iraq, which Rice referred to as proof of "high level cooperation in the field of security and [the] fight against terrorism."

Former U.S. Secretary of State Henry Kissinger arrived in Astana on 15 October, just two days after Rice's visit, also meeting with Nazarbayev. Kissinger said he believed the U.S. had a "good understanding with Kazakhstan [on] security ... The fact that high-ranked officials have regularly been visiting Kazakhstan lately shows that [the U.S. Government is] keen to broaden this cooperation."

U.S. Secretary of State John Kerry visited Astana on 1–2 November 2015, as part of his Central Asian tour to reassure the multilateral ties between the U.S. and the Central Asian nations. In Astana, Secretary Kerry participated in the U.S.–Kazakhstan Strategic Partnership Dialogue, met with Foreign Minister Idrissov and President Nazarbayev, and delivered a speech at the Nazarbayev University.

== Visit of Kazakh journalists to Los Angeles ==
Sabir Kairkhanov, editor-in-chief of Ak Zhaiyk; Botagoz Akzholovna Seidakhmetova, international news editor of Novoye Pokoleniye, and Dossym Satpayev, director of Assessment Risks Group, an NGO which publishes Kazakhstan Risk Review visited the University of California, Los Angeles on 1 August as part of a three-week tour of the U.S. in an attempt to gain insight on the war on terrorism. They met with political science and economics professor Michael Intriligator who told the delegation about the possibility of terrorist attacks targeting the U.S. Navy. The journalists noted that in Kazakhstan new courses about terrorism have been added to universities' curricula and Urban terrorism, a book mostly about terrorists in Almaty, has been published. They also discussed the Shanghai Cooperation Organization.

The visitors all ranked Al-Qaeda as the 8th greatest terrorist-danger in Kazakhstan. Professor Intriligator said it is "absolutely premature to say that we have won the War against Terrorism. We are not any safer now than we were before September 11."

== Resident diplomatic missions ==
of Kazakhstan in the United States

- Washington, D.C. (Embassy)
- Houston (Consulate-General)
- New York City (Consulate-General)
- San Francisco (Consulate-General)

of the United States in Kazakhstan

- Astana (Embassy)
- Almaty (Consulate-General)

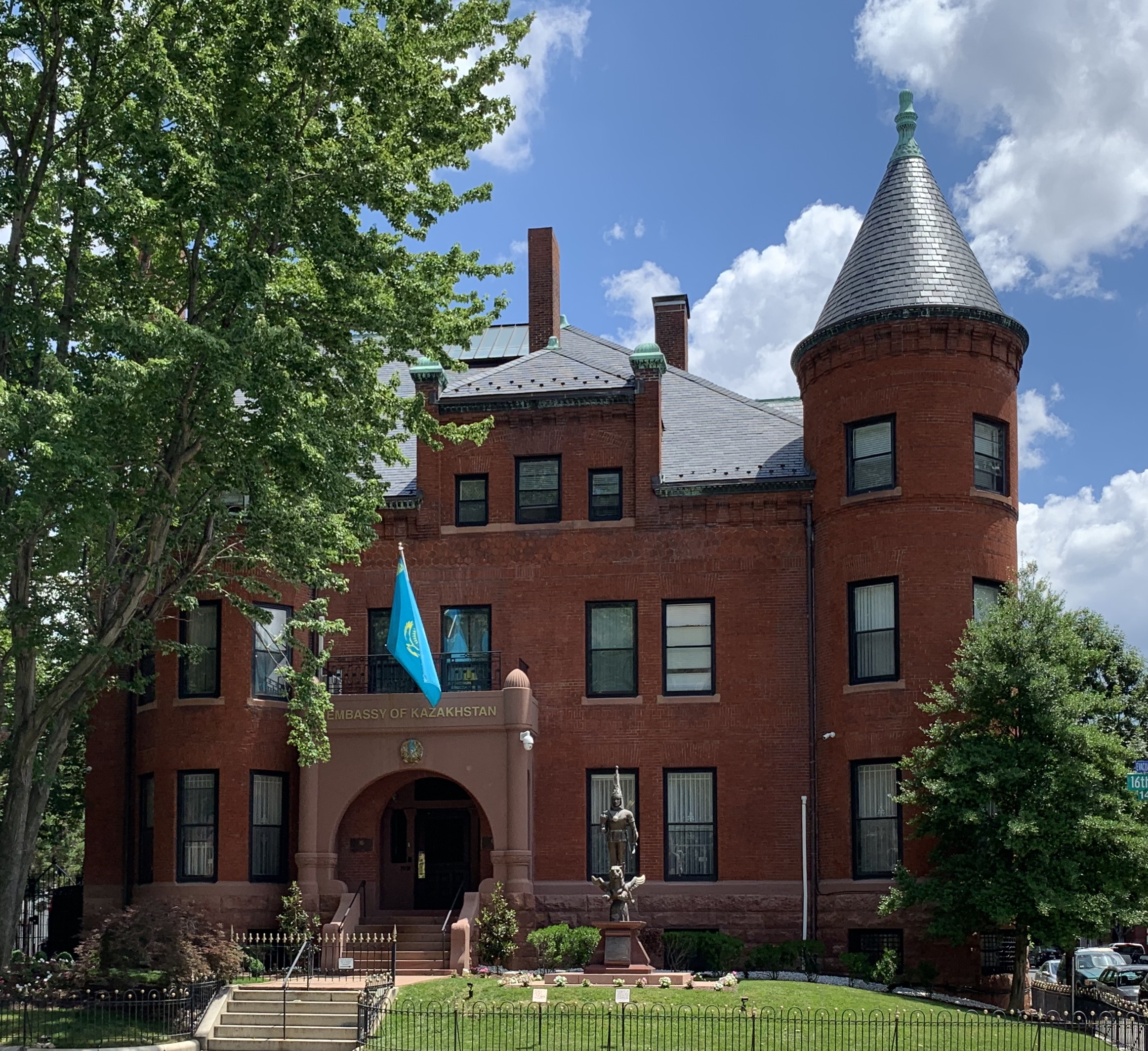
Embassy of Kazakhstan in Washington, D.C.

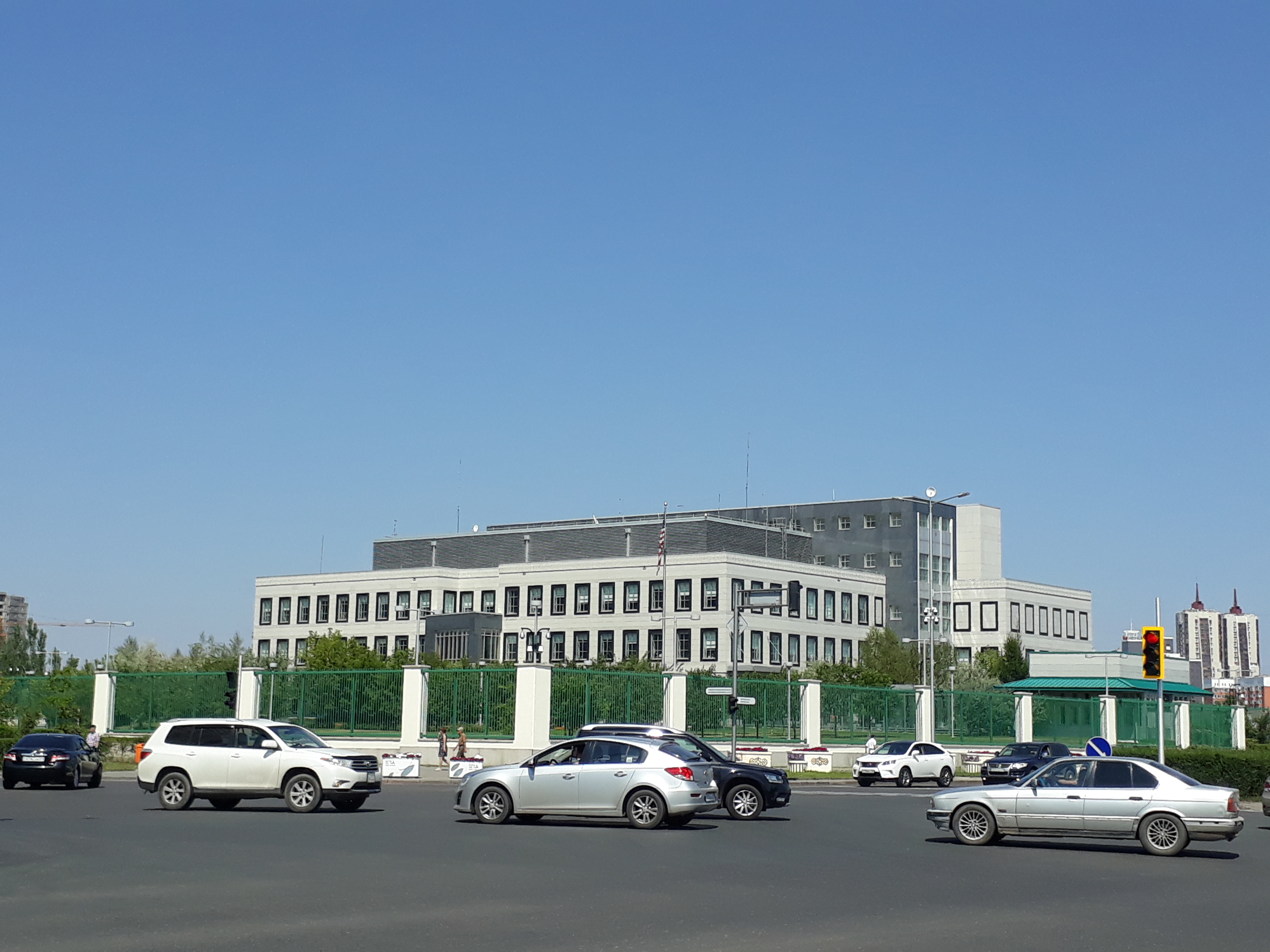
Embassy of the United States in Astana

== See also ==
- Kazakh Americans
- Foreign relations of Kazakhstan
- Foreign relations of the United States
- Institute for New Democracies
- Petroleum politics
- United States oil politics
