= Kazakhstan–Mexico relations =

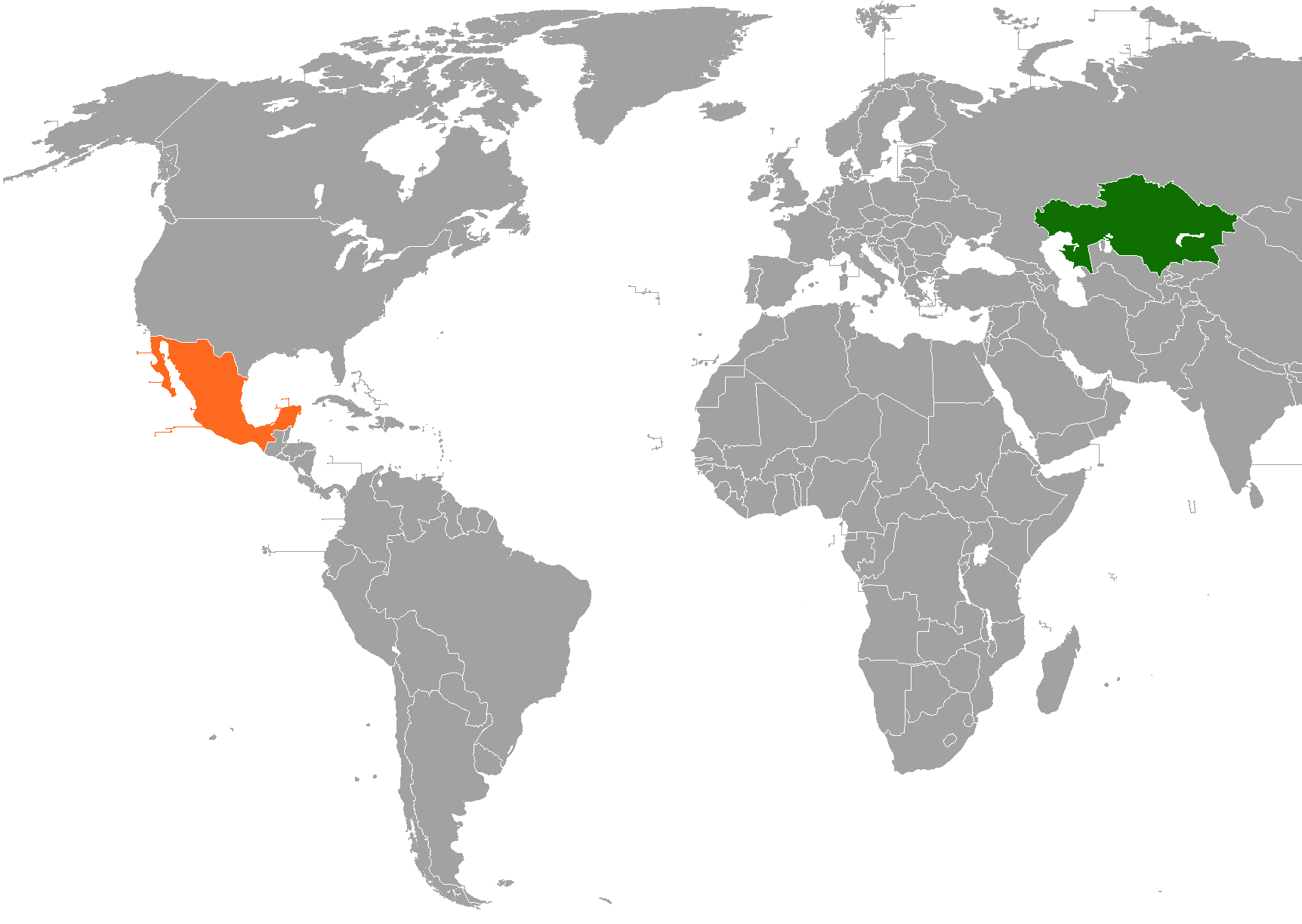

- Kazakhstan: Mexico

The nations of Kazakhstan and Mexico established diplomatic relations in 1992. Both nations are members of the United Nations and the World Trade Organization.

== History ==
Kazakhstan and Mexico formally established diplomatic relations on 14 January 1992, soon after the dissolution of the Soviet Union. Initially, there has been little diplomatic contact between both nations, with representatives of both nations meeting only at international forums such as at the United Nations.

In September 2014, Kazakh Foreign Minister Erlan Idrissov paid an official visit to Mexico, the highest level visit to Mexico by a Kazakh official. Idrissov met his Mexican counterpart Foreign Minister José Antonio Meade and held private meetings with the Secretary of the Economy Ildefonso Guajardo Villarreal, President of the Senate Miguel Barbosa Huerta and former President Vicente Fox. During his visit, both nations announced plans to open resident embassies in each other's capitals, respectively.

Both nations have increased cooperation in establishing mechanisms for their regions to become nuclear-free zones. In May 2015, a Russian rocket carrying a Mexican satellite was launched from Kazakhstan and crashed minutes afterwards due to technical issues. In 2016, Kazakhstan opened a resident embassy in Mexico City. In 2017, Mexico participated in the Expo 2017 which was held in Astana and attended by Mexican Foreign Undersecretary Carlos de Icaza González.

In 2022, both nations attended their third bilateral meeting matters of common interest, held in Mexico City. That same year, both nations celebrated 30 years of diplomatic relations.

== High-level visits ==
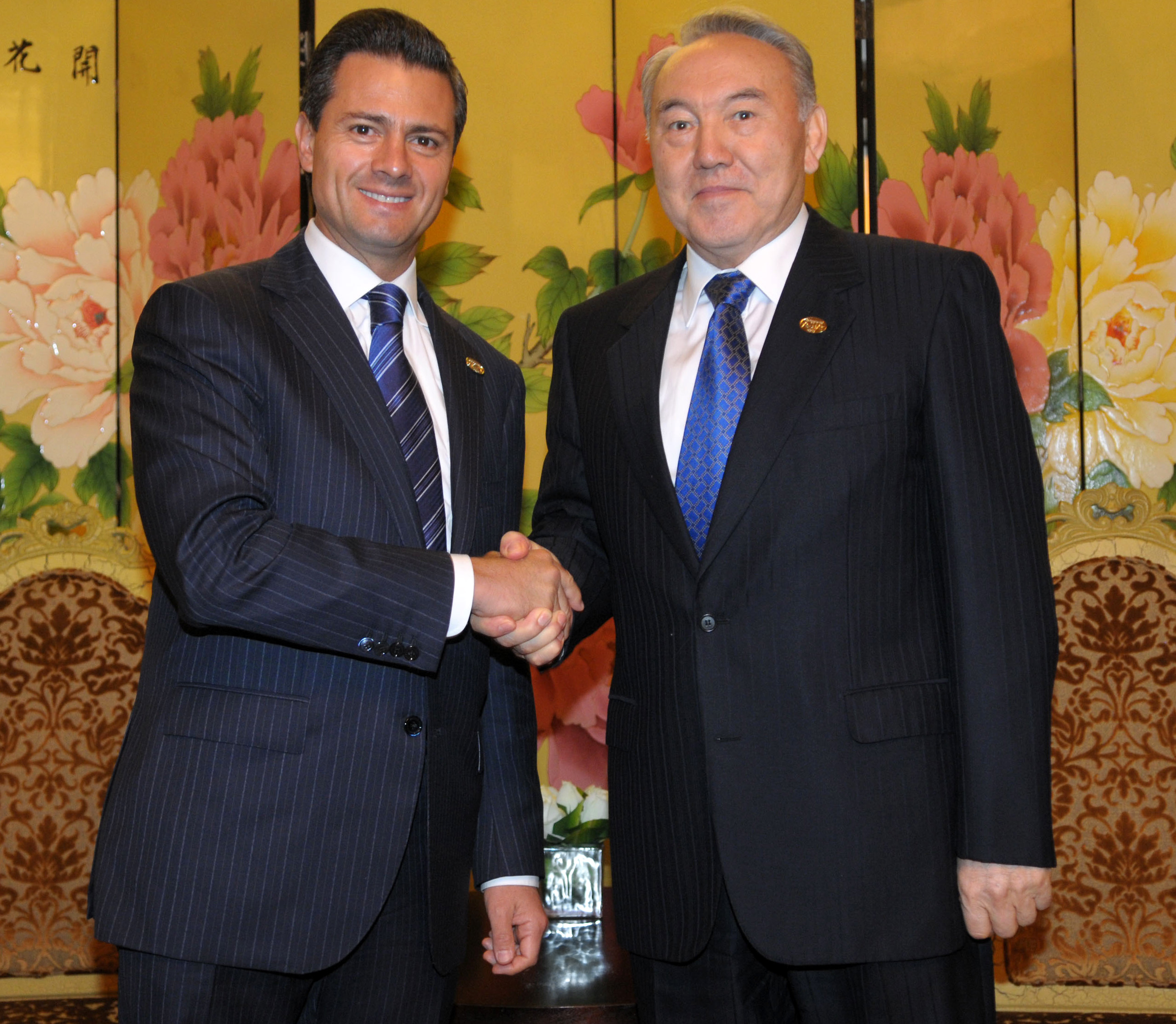
Mexican President Enrique Peña Nieto and Kazakh President Nursultan Nazarbayev in Bo'ao, China; April 2013.

High-level visits from Kazakhstan to Mexico

- Foreign Minister Erlan Idrissov (2014)
- Foreign Vice Minister Yerzhan Ashikbayev (2015)
- Head of the Americas Department of the Ministry of Foreign Affairs Nurgali Arystanov (2022)

High-level visits from Mexico to Kazakhstan

- Senator Gabriela Cuevas Barron (2015)
- Foreign Undersecretary Carlos de Icaza González (2017)

== Bilateral agreements ==
Both nations have signed a few bilateral agreements such as an Agreement to Abolish Visa Requirements for Official, Service and Diplomatic Passport (2014); Memorandum of Understanding on the Establishment of a Consultation Mechanism in the areas of Mutual Interests between the both Foreign Ministries of the countries (2014) and a Memorandum of Understanding in Cooperation between the Kazakh Academy of Public Administration and the Mexican Matias Romero Institute which prepares diplomats, and also adopted a joint statement reflecting bilateral issues and positions of the two countries on global issues (2014).

== Trade ==
In 2023, bilateral trade between both nations amounted to US$32.3 million. Kazakhstan's main exports to Mexico include: minerals, ferroalloys, chemical based products, and printed circuits. Mexico's main exports to Kazakhstan include: tubes and pipes, pipe fittings, telephones and mobile phones, motor vehicles and parts, alcohol, and petroleum.

== Resident diplomatic missions ==
- Kazakhstan has an embassy in Mexico City.
- Mexico is accredited to Kazakhstan from its embassy in Ankara, Turkey and maintains an honorary consulate in Almaty.

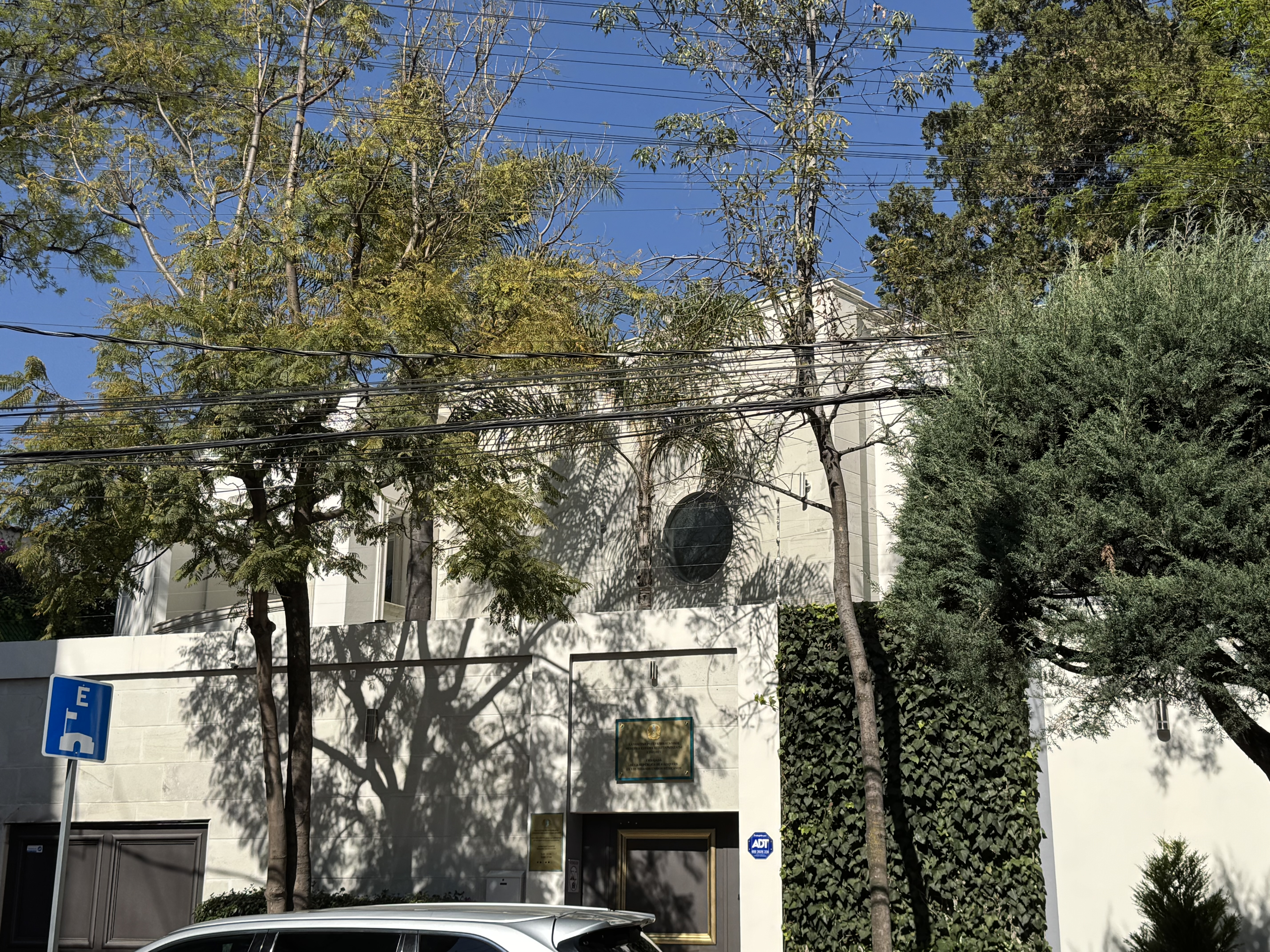
Embassy of Kazakhstan in Mexico City

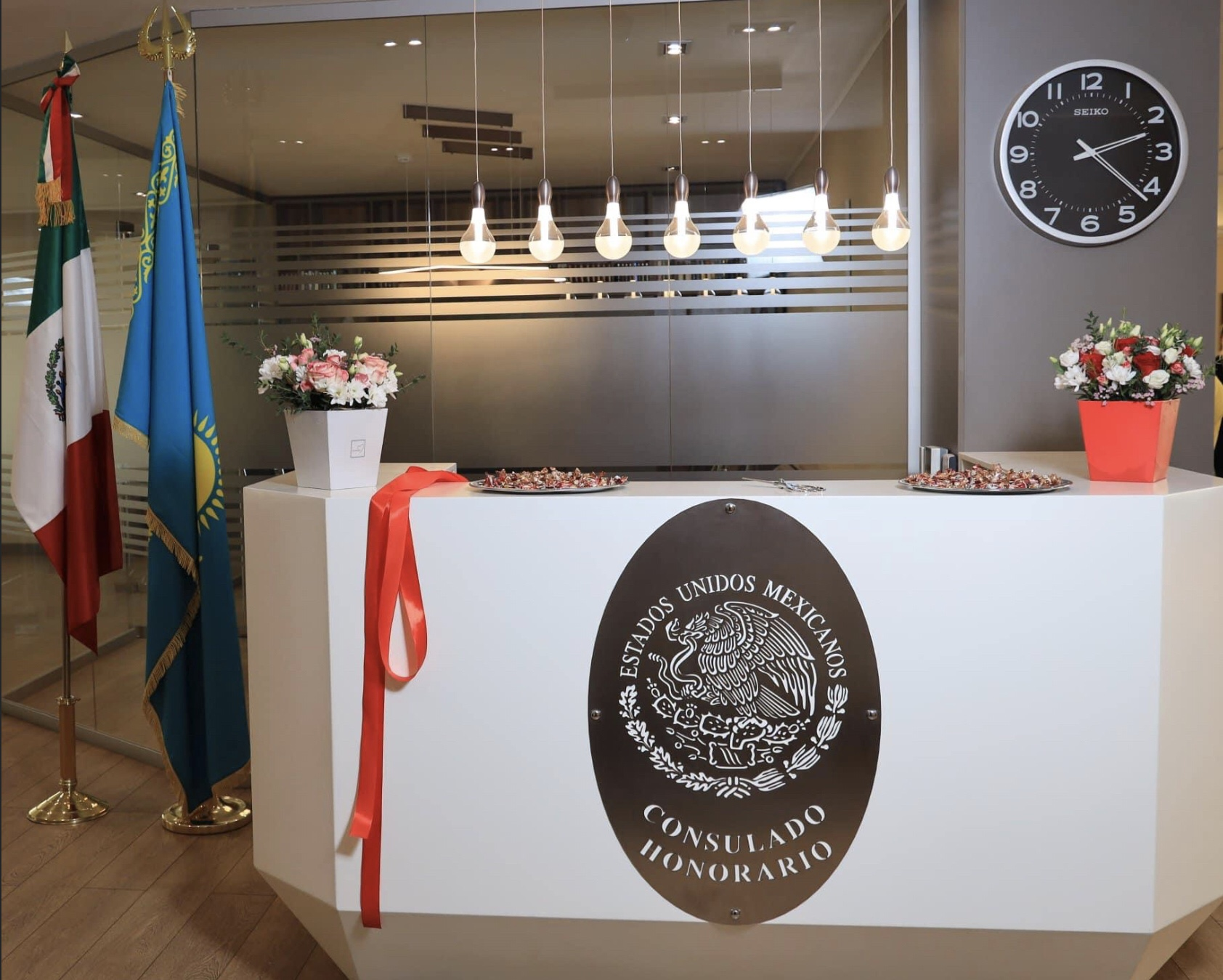
Honorary consulate of Mexico in Almaty

== See also ==
- Foreign relations of Kazakhstan
- Foreign relations of Mexico
