= Embassy of the United States, Astana =

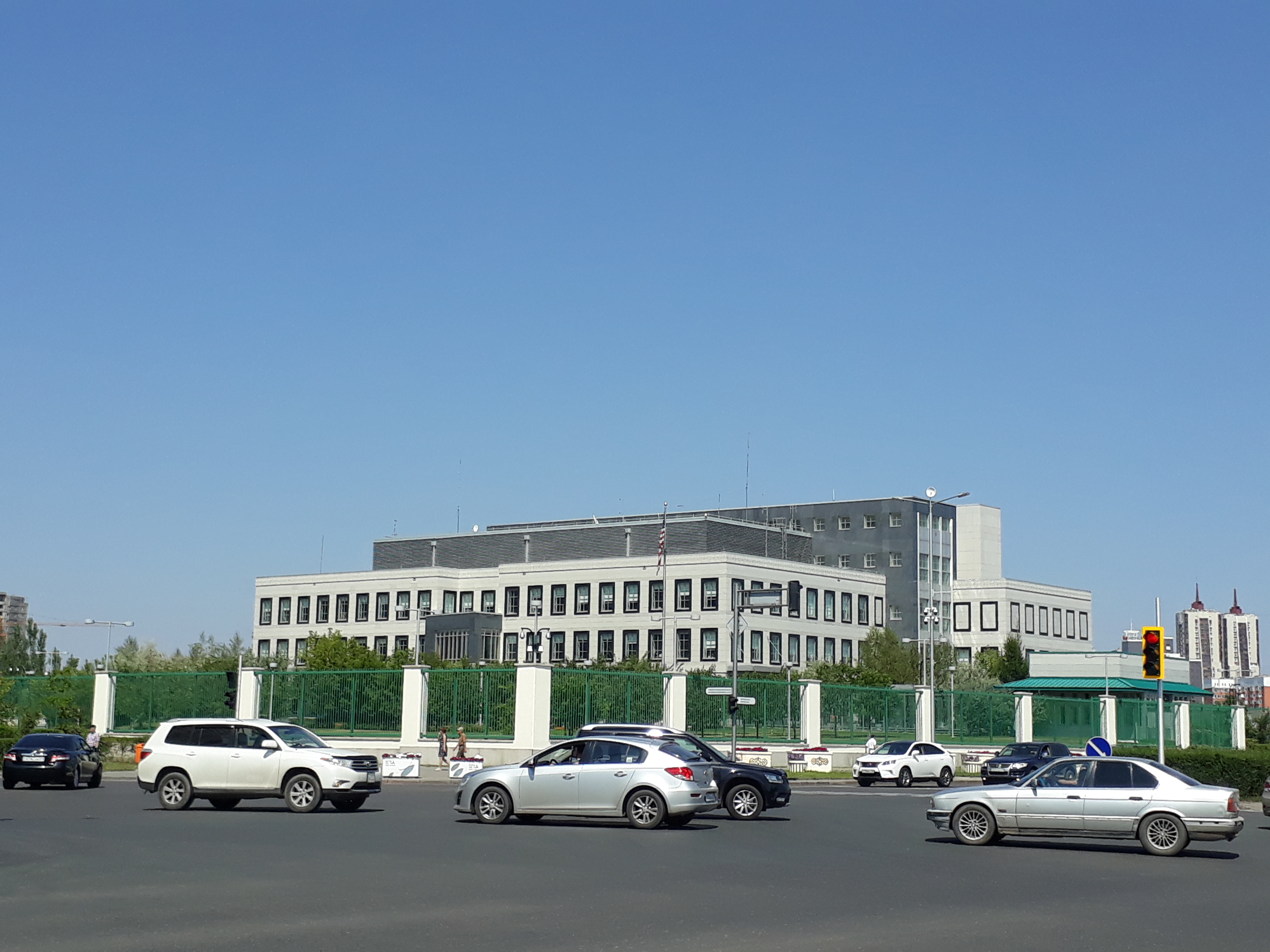
- Location: Astana, Kazakhstan
- Address: Raqymjan Qoshqarbayev Ave 3, Astana 010000, Kazakhstan
- Coordinates: 51°7′44″N 71°28′8″E
- Website: kz.usembassy.gov

The Embassy of the United States in Astana is the diplomatic mission of the United States in Kazakhstan.

== History ==
The United States formally recognized the independence of Kazakhstan on 25 December, 1991, which was the same day the President George H.W. Bush addressed the nation on the dissolution of the Soviet Union. The first American Embassy in Kazakhstan was set up in Alma-Ata (currently Almaty) on 3 February, 1992, with William Harrison Courtney assuming the position as the Chargé d'Affaires ad interim.

The Embassy of the United States was originally located in Almaty, the former capital of Kazakhstan. However, following the transfer of the capital from Almaty to Astana, the U.S. Embassy was also relocated to Astana in 2006. On 14 November 2006, an official opening ceremony was held for the new building of the Embassy of the United States in Kazakhstan in Astana. The ceremony was attended by the President of Kazakhstan, Nursultan Nazarbayev.

The two nations have worked closely together after Kazakhstan renounced its nuclear weapons in 1993 and shut down the Semipalatinsk Test Site (the primary testing venue for the Soviet Union's nuclear weapons), with the United States aiding Kazakhstan in the disposal of its nuclear arsenal and infrastructure. The country is the number one producer of uranium ore as of 2021. In addition to the main Embassy in Astana, there is a U.S. Consulate General located in Almaty which maintains certain consular and diplomatic functions within the country.

== See also ==
- Embassy of Kazakhstan, Washington, D.C.
- Kazakhstan–United States relations
- List of ambassadors of the United States to Kazakhstan
