= Burhan-bulak falls =

Natural waterfall in Kazakhstan

Coordinates: 45°0′27.4″N 79°12′26.9″E

Burhan-Bulak
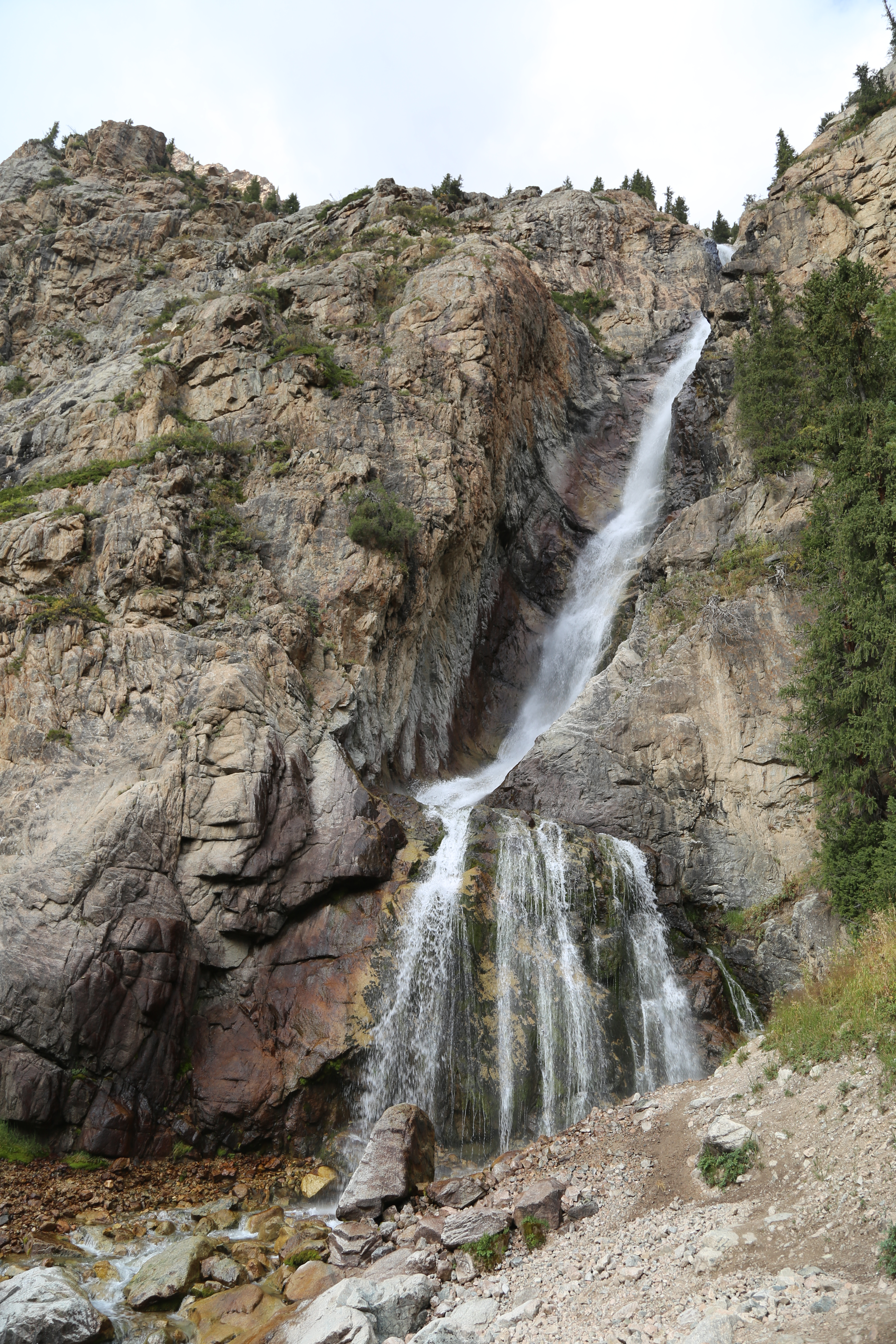
- Location: Almaty Region, Kazakhstan

Burhan-bulak Falls is the tallest waterfall in Kazakhstan. It is located in the Kora River gorge in the Jongar Alatau mountains.

At an altitude of 2000 metres, the Falls are 168 metres long.

== Legend ==
According to legend, a woman lived near the falls with her only child, a son named Burhan. Doting on Burhan, his mother him to marry a quiet, obedient girl. However, Burhan fell in love with Cora, a proud, self-willed woman. His mother became angry - she erected a large castle in the rock to imprison Burhan.

However, Burhan escaped and joined Cora for eternity as the Kora River. The mother pours out her grief as Mother's Tears, a small stream near the waterfall.
