= Embassy of Kazakhstan, Washington, D.C. =

Diplomatic mission of the Republic of Kazakhstan to the United States

Embassy of Kazakhstan in Washington, D.C.
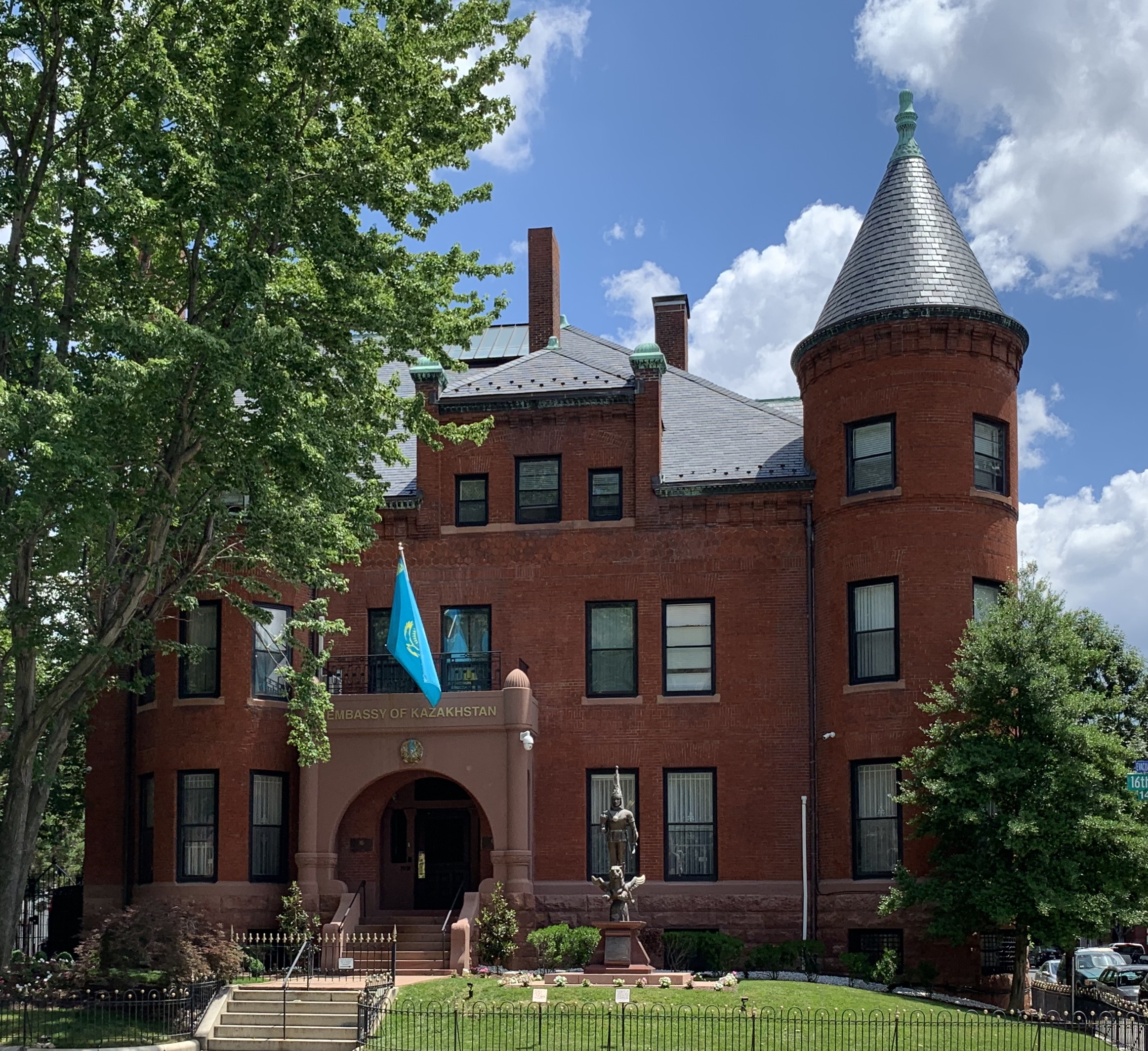
- Location: Washington, DC, United States
- Address: 1401 16th Street NW, Washington, DC.
- Coordinates: 38°54′31″N 77°2′10″W
- Ambassador: Yerzhan Ashikbayev

The Embassy of Kazakhstan in Washington, D.C. is the diplomatic mission of the Republic of Kazakhstan to the United States. It is located at 1401 16th Street Northwest, Washington, D.C. in the Dupont Circle neighborhood.

The embassy house is a spacious, brick, Richardsonian-style house, featuring a massive hip roof, prominent chimneys and a distinctive round corner tower built in 1888. The house was designed and built by Charles and Samuel Edmonston for Susan Shields, the widow of a wealthy newspaper publisher. The house used to be the home of American Vice President James S. Sherman, the 27th Vice President of the United States. Outside the house stands a smaller version of the Golden Warrior Monument which celebrates Kazakhstan's independence.

The current ambassador is Yerzhan Ashikbayev and was preceded by Erzhan Kazykhanov.

== See also ==
- Kazakhstan–United States relations
- Sixteenth Street Historic District
