= Institute for New Democracies =

US based non-profit organization

The Institute for New Democracies is a United States–based nonprofit organization established to promote good governance, human rights and the rule of law in countries undergoing political transformation.

The organization's founders included former U.S. Ambassador Victor Jackovich, historian Walter Laqueur, U.S. foreign policy expert Martha Brill Olcott, philosopher/journalist/diplomat Michael Novak, Margarita Assenova, Mjusa Sever, journalist Mike Stone, Ilona Teleki of the Center for Strategic and International Studies (CSIS), Aimee Breslow, Marek Michalewski, Ruth Greenspan Bell, and Polish politician and journalist Radosław Sikorski. Lawrence DeNardis, a former U.S. Congressman and university president, is currently chairman of its governing board; Margarita Assenova is its executive director.

== Projects ==
The Institute is partnered with the CSIS New European Democracies Project in the "U.S.-Kazakhstan Task Force: Shaping and Supporting Kazakhstan’s OSCE Chairmanship Agenda," an initiative aimed at strengthening U.S.–Kazakh relations and assisting Kazakhstan in efforts related to its one-year chairmanship of the Organization for Security and Co-operation in Europe (OSCE) in 2010. The project is funded by the government of Kazakhstan.

The Institute has worked in Uzbekistan since 2005 and was officially registered in the country in 2008. Currently, the Institute is engaged in a project to strengthen human rights protection in the country. With funding support from the United States Agency for International Development (USAID), the Institute is working on implementation of Uzbekistan's new habeas corpus law (which requires that a judge review nearly all arrests within 72 hours), consulting on prison reform and supporting local human rights activists engaged in independent prison monitoring, and organizing roundtable discussions to promote religious freedom. A report released by the Institute in 2009 noted that since 2000 Uzbekistan had reduced its rate of incarceration to less than half of its previous level and had eliminated the death penalty.
