= Nurgali Arystanov =

Kazakh diplomat (b. 1978)

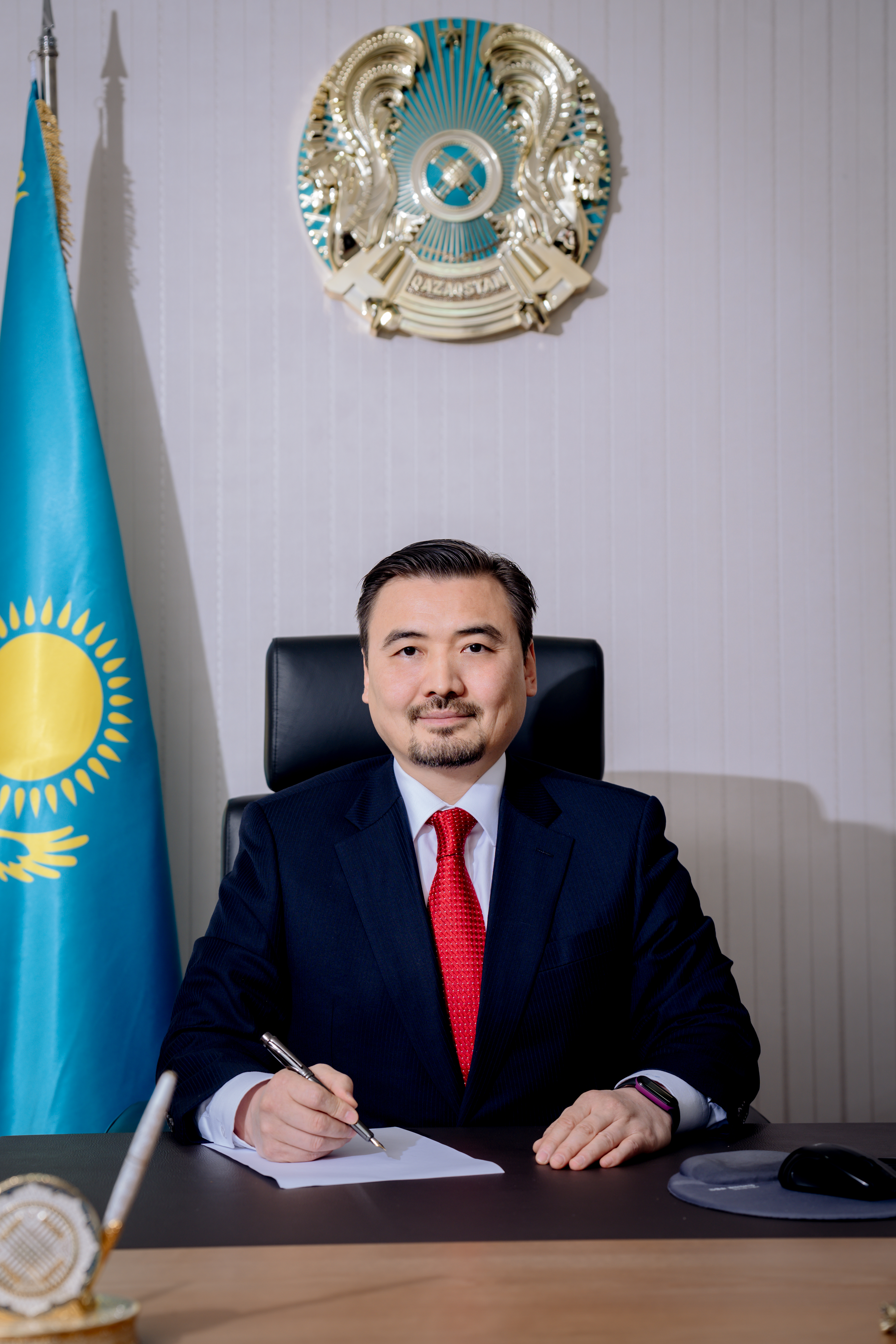
Nurgali Arystanov in 2023

Nurgali A. Arystanov (Kaz. Нұрғали Алмасбайұлы Арыстанов; born May 31, 1978, Kyzylorda region) is a Kazakh diplomat and Ambassador of the Republic of Kazakhstan to the Republic of Korea.

== Education ==
2014 - Master of International Public Policy, Paul H. Nitze School of Advanced International Studies (SAIS), Johns Hopkins University, Washington D.C., the United States;

1999 - Bachelor of International Economic Relations, Al-Farabi Kazakh National University, Almaty, Kazakhstan.

== Work experience ==
Since June 2023 - Ambassador of the Republic of Kazakhstan to the Republic of Korea;

2021-2023 - Head of the Americas Department of the Ministry of Foreign Affairs of the Republic of Kazakhstan;

2019-2021 - Head of the Asia Pacific Department of the Ministry of Foreign Affairs of the Republic of Kazakhstan;

2017-2019 - Head of the U.S. Division; Deputy Head of the Americas Department of the Ministry of Foreign Affairs of the Republic of Kazakhstan;

1999-2017 - Various positions at the Headquarters (Bilateral Cooperation Department; Asia and Africa Department; Americas Department) and Embassies overseas – Pakistan (1999-2004), India (2005-2009) and the United States (2010-2017).

Nurgali Arystanov has the diplomatic rank of Extraordinary and Plenipotentiary Envoy of the 1st Class.
