= Alatau, Medeu District, Almaty =

Alatau
- Location in Kazakhstan
- Coordinates: 43°21′27″N 77°8′40″E
- Country: Kazakhstan
- Region: Almaty Region
- Time zone: UTC+6 (Omsk Time)

Alatau (Kazakh: Алатау, lit. 'motley mountain') is a settlement 25 km. off the center of Almaty, south-eastern Kazakhstan. Administratively, it is included in the Medeu District of Almaty and informally recognized as a microdistrict of Almaty.

The settlement was established in 1957 as an unnamed settlement for scientific institutions and their workers. Now it has Institute of Nuclear Physics, Kazakhstan National Nuclear Center (formerly of the Kazakh SSR Academy of Sciences) with an experimental nuclear reactor and cyclotron, Physis and Technology Institute, as well as the special economical zone "Innovation Technology Park".
