= Institute of Nuclear Physics (Kazakhstan) =

Nuclear physics research institute

- ЯДРОЛЫҚ ФИЗИКА ИНСТИТУТЫ
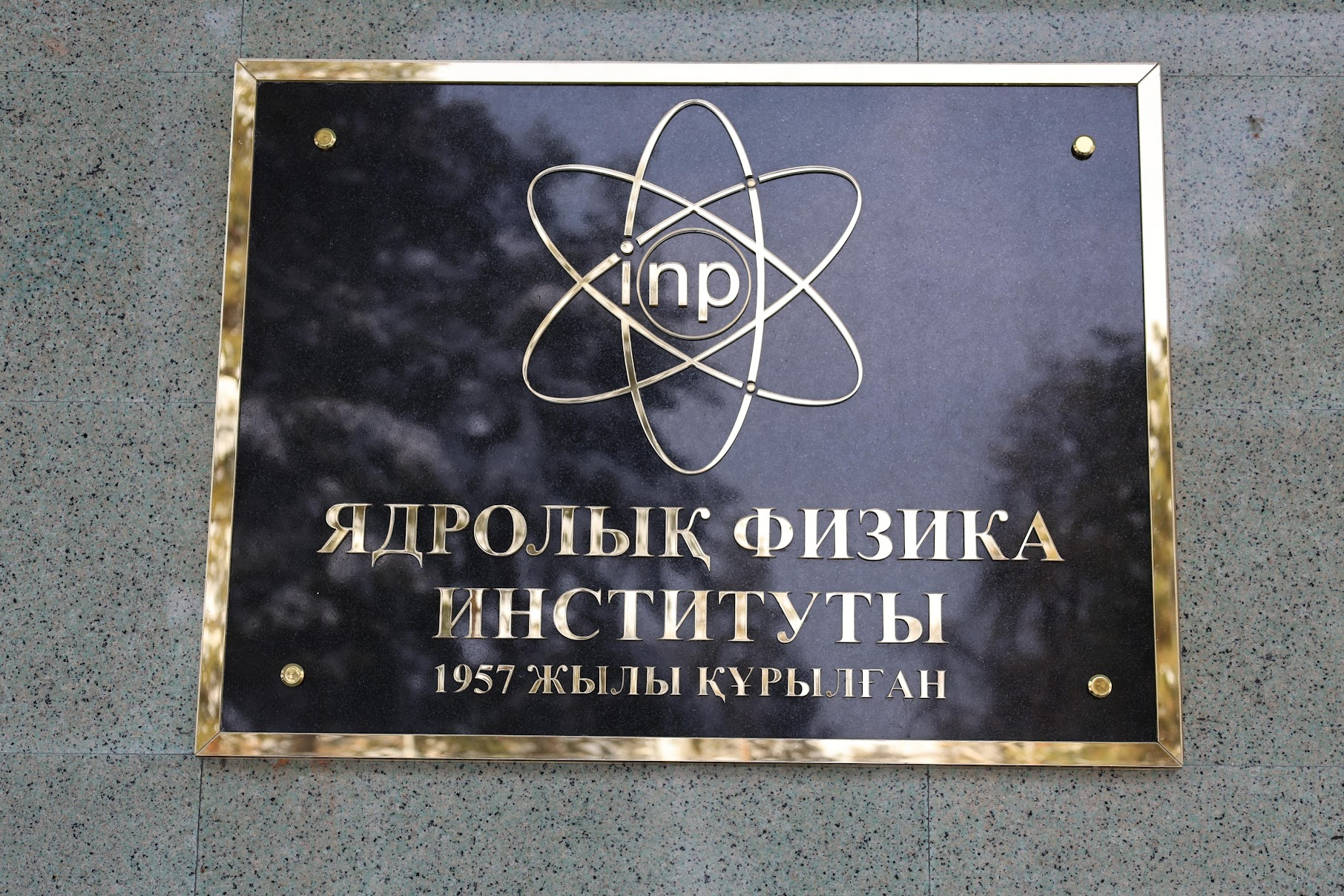
- Formation: 1957; 69 years ago
- Headquarters: Almaty, Kazakhstan
- Website: inp.kz/en

The Institute of Nuclear Physics, Kazakhstan (INP Kazakhstan) is a research institute based in Almaty, Kazakhstan. Established in 1957, it conducts research in nuclear physics and applied nuclear technologies, including radiation safety and accelerator science. The institute operates research facilities, including the WWR-K research reactor.

== History ==
The institute was established in 1957 during the Soviet period as part of the development of nuclear research infrastructure in the Kazakh Soviet Socialist Republic. Following Kazakhstan's independence in 1991, the institute continued its research activities under national scientific authorities.

== Research activities ==
The institute conducts research in nuclear physics, radiation safety, nuclear technologies, materials science, and accelerator technology. Its activities include both fundamental and applied research.

== Facilities ==
The institute operates scientific laboratories and research facilities, including reactor and accelerator installations. The facilities include the WWR-K research reactor, which has been used for fundamental and applied studies since its commissioning.

== International cooperation ==
The institute has participated in international scientific collaborations and research programs, including cooperative agreements with foreign research organizations.
