= Yerzhan Ashikbayev =

Kazakhstani politician

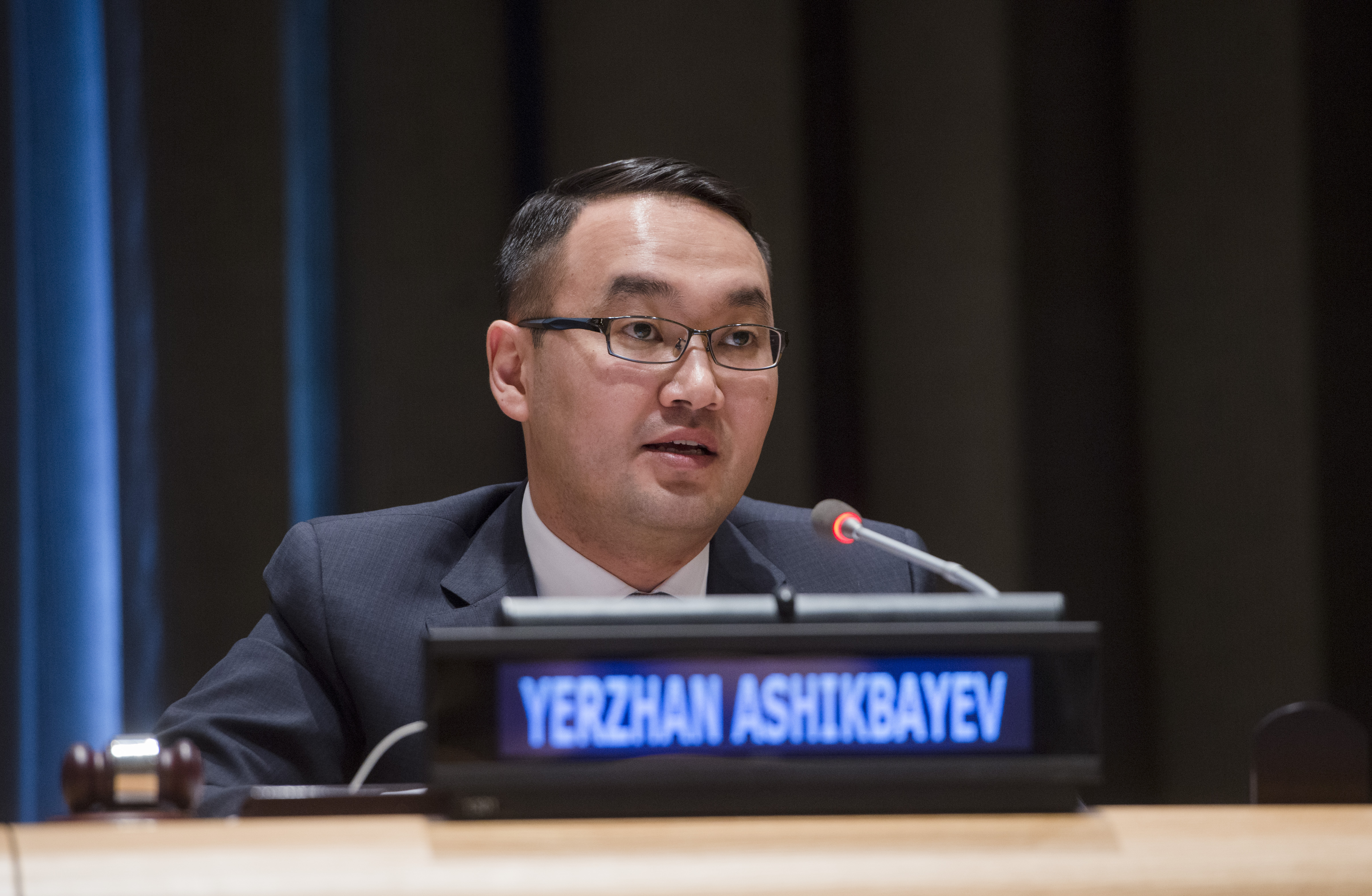
Ashikbayev, 2015

Yerzhan Ashikbayev (Kazakh: Ержан Ашықбаев, Erjan Aşyqbaev; born in Almaty) was appointed in April 2021 the Ambassador of the Republic of Kazakhstan to the United States. He served previously as the Deputy Foreign Minister of the Republic of Kazakhstan since 2013. Previously, he served as Deputy Head of the Prime Minister's office, Head of Foreign Policy at the office of the President, and Head of the Foreign Minister's Chancellery. In his role as deputy foreign minister, Ashikbayev is Kazakhstan's diplomatic point person for matters of the United Nations and the Americas. Ashikbayev is a lead communicator on the Enhanced Strategic Partnership Dialogue with the United States.

He graduated from Al-Farabi Kazakh National University (BA) and Harvard Kennedy School (MPA).
