= List of Kazakhs =

This is a list of notable ethnic Kazakhs.

== Actors, filmmakers and fashion models ==
- Farhat Abdraimov (1966–2021), actor
- Shaken Aimanov (1914–1970), film director, actor
- Berik Aitjanov (born 1979), actor, film producer
- Dinmukhamet Akhimov (born 1948), actor
- Damir Amangeldin (born 2002), actor
- Emir Baigazin (born 1984), actor, film director
- Timur Bekmambetov (born 1961), film director
- Khadisha Bukeyeva (1917–2011), theater and film actress
- C.C.TAY (born 2000), singer and actress
- Eva Dedova (born 1992), actress
- Ruslana Korshunova (1987–2008), international fashion model
- Sergei Lukyanenko (born 1968), author, screenwriter
- Sabira Maykanova (1914–1994), actress
- Rashid Nugmanov (born 1954), film director
- Linda Nigmatulina (born 1983), actress
- Venera Nigmatulina (born 1962), actress
- Gulshat Omarova (born 1968), writer, film director and actress
- Darezhan Omirbaev (born 1958), film director, screenwriter
- Kuman Tastanbekov (1945–2017), actor
- Vladimir Tolokonnikov (1943–2017), actor
- Gulnara Sarsenova (born 1961), film producer
- Alyona Subbotina (born 1990), international fashion model
- Bayan Yessentayeva (born 1974), producer, television presenter, actress
- Samal Yeslyamova (born 1984), actress
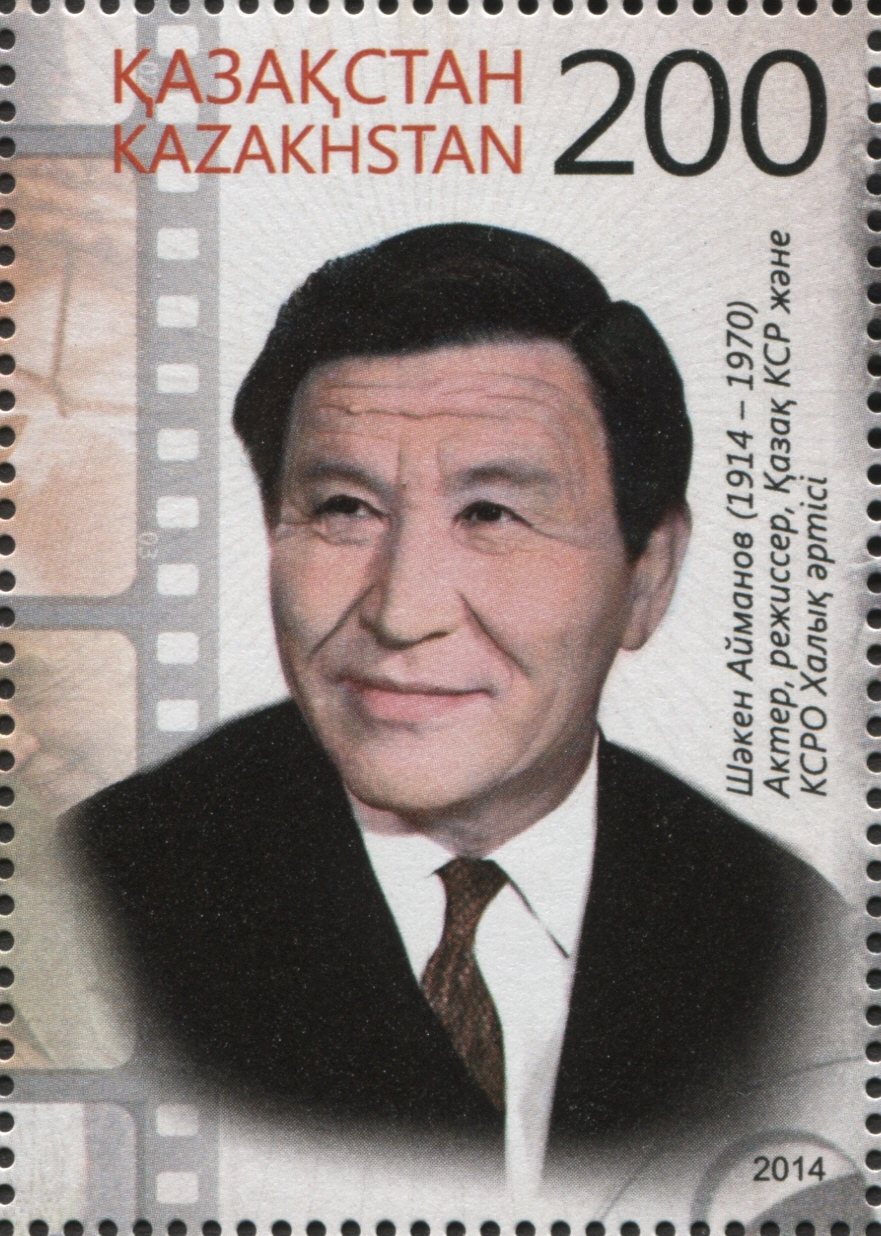
Aimanov

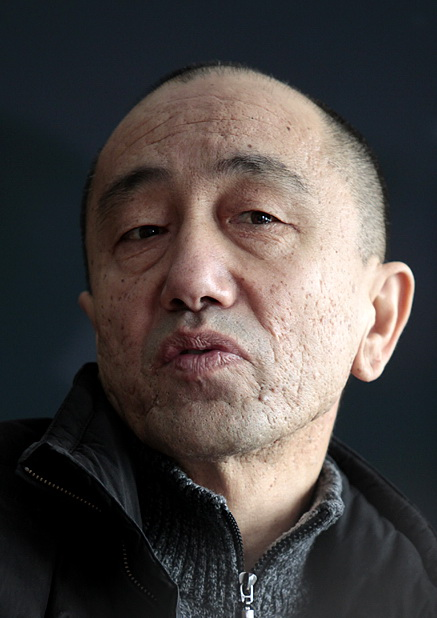
Omirbaev

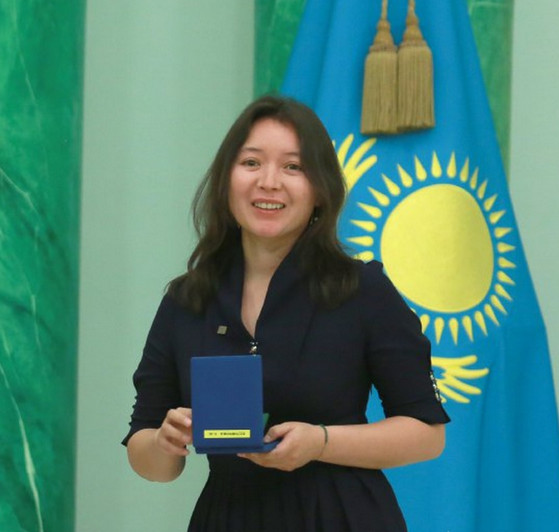
Yeslyamova

== Artists ==
- Altynai Asylmuratova (born 1961), ballerina
- Dilka Bear (born 1977), painter
- Agimsaly Duzelkhanov (born 1951), artist
- Aigana Gali (born Ayganim Sadykova, 1981), multimedia artist
- Aisha Galimbaeva (1917–2008), painter and educator
- Gulfairus Mansurovna Ismailova (1929–2013), artist, actress
- Lazzate Maralbayeva (born 1951), painter and architect
- Sergey Kalmykov (1891–1967), painter, draughtsman and writer
- Abilkhan Kasteev (1904–1973), painter
- Zhenis Kakenuly Nurlybayev (born 1965), painter
- Rustam Khalfin (1949–2008), painter
- Leyla Mahat (born 1970), artist, curator, gallery director, associate professor
- Almagul Menlibayeva (born 1969), artist
- Shaken Niyazbekov (1938–2014), artist, designer of the flag of Kazakhstan
- Edige Niyazov (1940–2009), photographer
- Malik Oskenbay (born 1966), artist, sculptor
- Yesken Sergebayev (born 1940), sculptor
- Chezhina Svetlana (born 1985), comic book artist
- Ural Tansykbayev (1904–1974)
- Ola Volo (born 1989), Canadian muralist of Kazakh descent
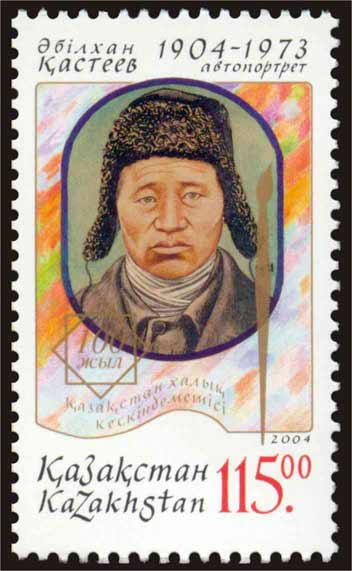
Kasteev

== Writers and poets ==
- Zharaskan Abdirash – poet
- Karina Abdullina (born 1976) – poet and singer
- Daniyar Adilbekov (born 1989) - journalist
- Ibrahim Altynsarin (1841–1889) – pedagogue, writer
- Mukhtar Auezov (1897–1961) – writer, public figure
- Ahmed Baitursynuli (1873–1937) – poet, writer, pedagogue and politician
- Alikhan Bukeikhanov (1866–1937) – writer, political activist and environmental scientist
- Mir Yakub Dulatuli (1885–1935) – poet, writer and a leader of Alash Orda government
- Bukhar-zhirau Kalmakanov (1693–1789) – poet
- Aigul Kemelbayeva (born 1965) – prose writer and literary critic
- Baqytjan Kanapyanov (born 1951) – poet and lyricist
- Mukaghali Makatayev (1931–1976) – akyn, poet
- Bakhyt Kenjeev Russian poet and writer
- Bauyrjan Momyshuly (1910–1982) – writer, hero of the Soviet Union during World War II
- Sabid Mukanov (1900–1973) – poet and writer
- Gabit Musirepov (1902–1985) – writer, playwright
- Seitzhan Omarov (1907–1985) – writer
- Ibrahim Qunanbaiuly (1845–1904) – poet, composer and philosopher
- Saken Seifullin (1894–1939) – poet and writer, national activist
- Mukhtar Shakhanov (born 1942) – writer, lawmaker, ambassador
- Oljas Suleimenov (born 1936) – poet, politician, and anti-nuclear activist
- Aigerim Tazhi (born 1981) – poet
- Sultanmahmud Toraygirov (1893–1920) – poet and writer
- Tauman Torekhanov (born 1931) – writer, journalist and executive editor
- Muhammed Shoqan Qanafiya Shynghysuly Walikhanov (1835–1865) – scholar, ethnographer and historian
- Ahmad Yasawi (1106–1166) – poet and Sufi (Muslim mystic)
- Zhambyl Zhabayuly (1846–1945) – akyn, student of Suinbay
- Muhammedjan Jumabayev (1893–1938) – writer, publicist, founder of modern Kazakh literature
- Qabdesh Zhumadilov (1936–2021) – writer
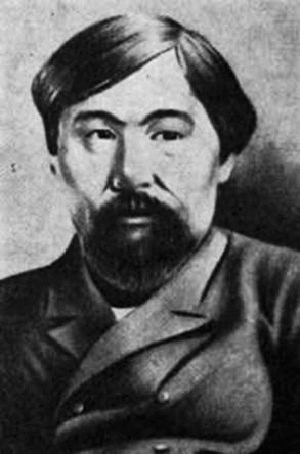
Altynsarin

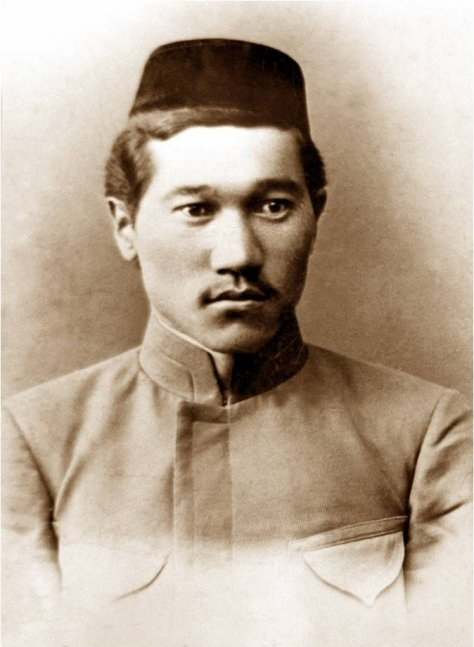
Dulatuli

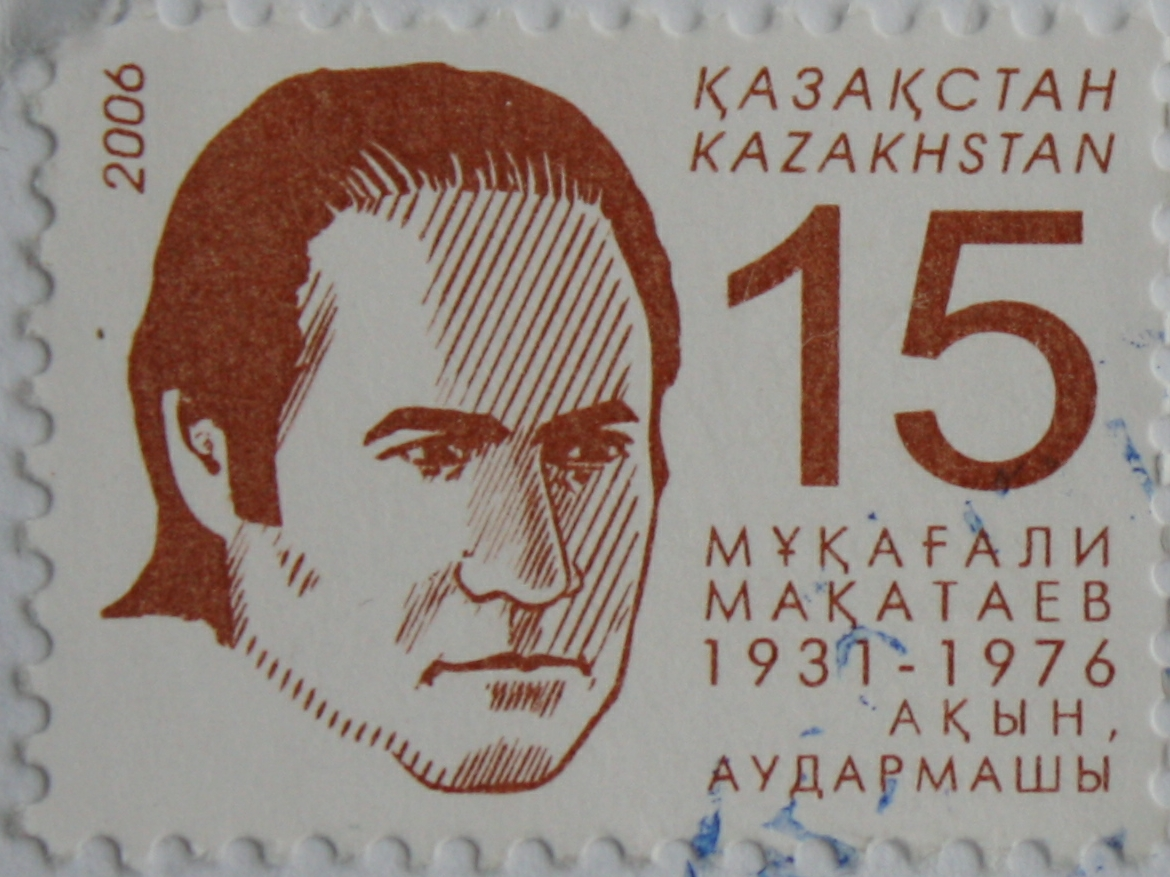
Makatayev

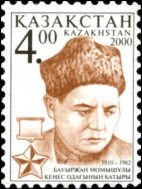
Momyshuly

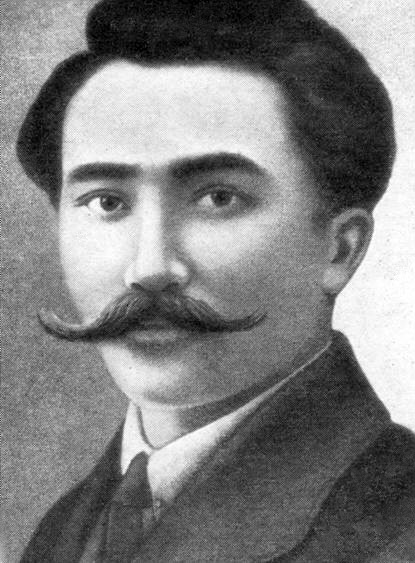
Seifullin

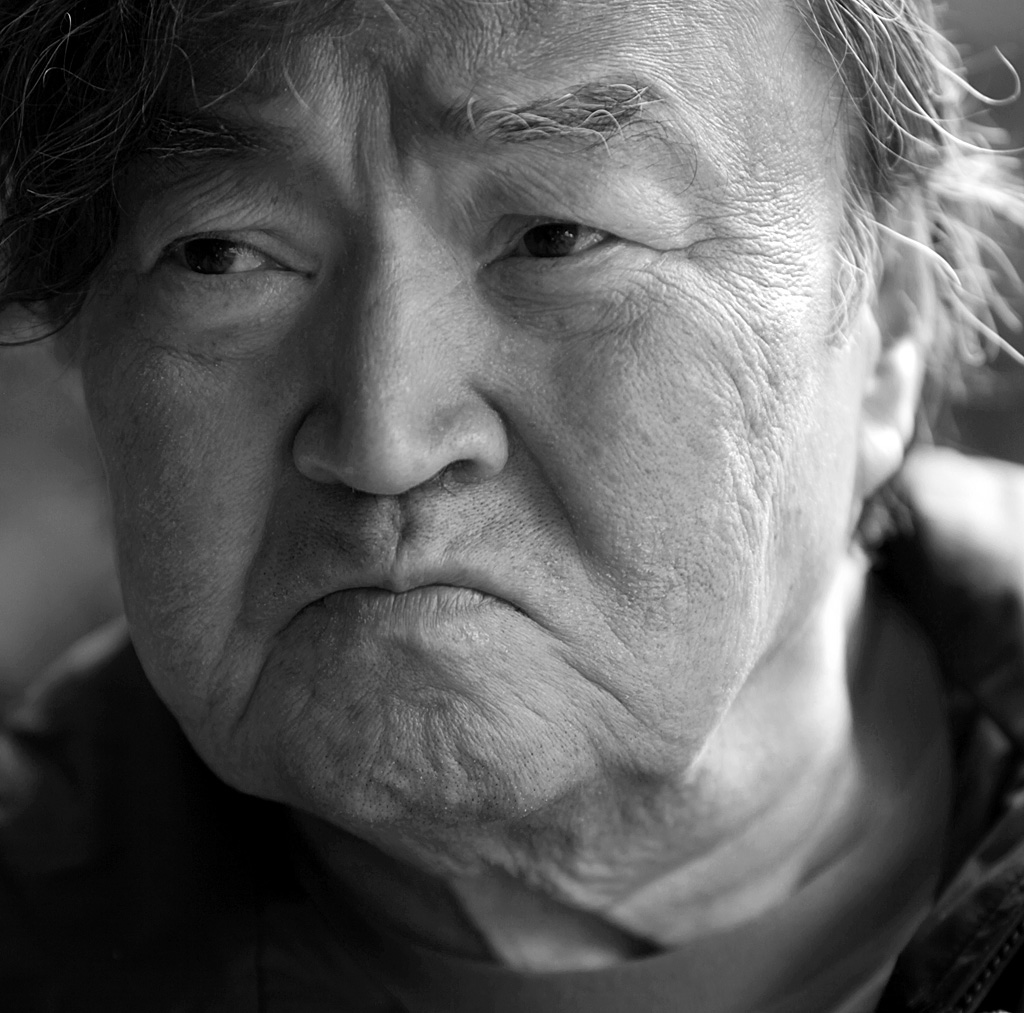
Suleimenov

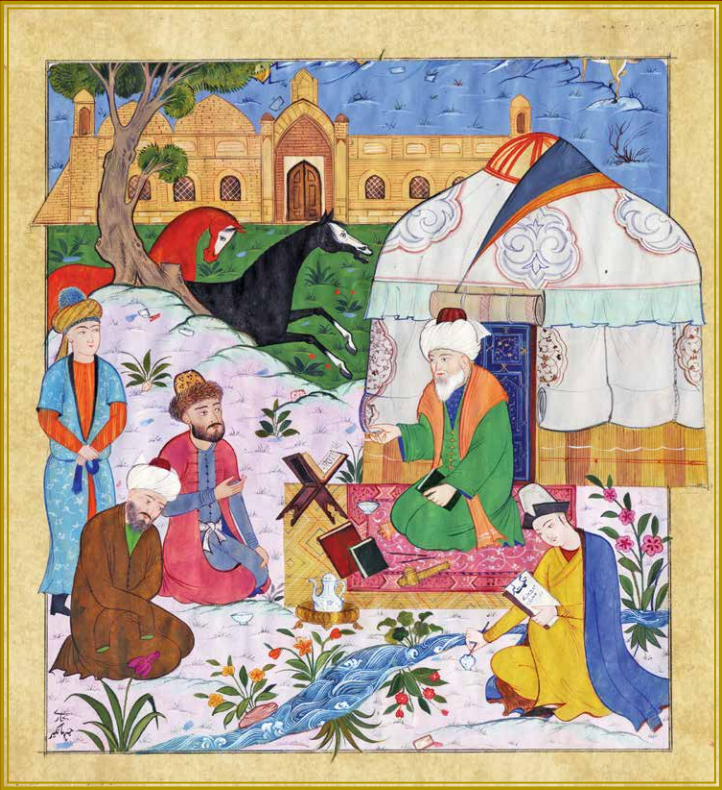
Yasawi

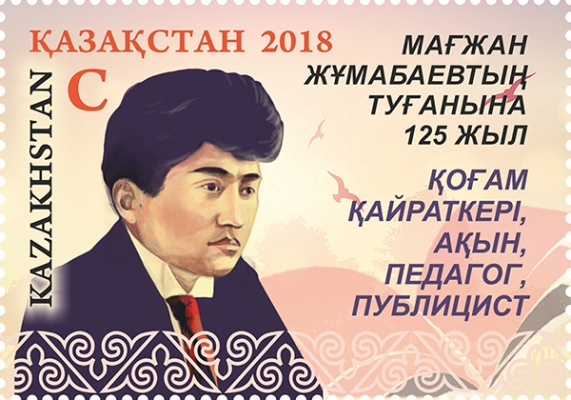
Zhumabayev

== Businessmen ==
- Mukhtar Ablyazov (born 1963), BTA Bank
- Bulat Abilov (born 1957), Sun & Wind Electric Stations
- Vladimir Kim (born 1960), KAZ Minerals
- Vyacheslav Kim (born 1969), Kaspi.kz
- Timur Kulibayev (born 1966), Halyk Bank, son-in-law of Nursultan Nazarbayev
- Oleg Novachuk (born 1971), Kazakhmys
- Dzhambulat Sarsenov (born 1961), Kazenergy
- Margulan Seisembayev (born 1966), Seimar

== Composers and musicians ==
- Dilnaz Akhmadieva (born 1980), pop singer
- Jania Aubakirova (born 1987), pianist
- Roza Baglanova (1922–2011), opera singer
- Kulyash Baiseitova (1912–1957), opera singer
- Marat Bisengaliev (born 1962), violinist and director of orchestras
- Alan Buribayev (born 1979), conductor
- Dos Mukasan (formed 1967), rock and pop music group
- Zhanar Dugalova (born 1987), singer
- Nagima Eskalieva (born 1954), singer
- Imanbek (born 2000), DJ and record producer
- Makpal Isabekova (born 1984), singer
- Darkhan Juzz (1990–2023), indie pop singer, songwriter, sound producer and musician
- Shamshi Kaldayakov (1930–1992), composer
- Nurzhan Kermenbayev (born 1989), singer
- Stanislav Khegai (born 1985), pianist
- Almas Kishkenbayev (born 1985), singer
- Kristian Kostov (born 2000), Bulgarian-Russian singer of Kazakh descent
- Erzhan Kulibaev (born 1986), Spanish violinist of Kazakh descent
- Erik Kurmangaliev (1959–2008), opera singer
- Maria Mudryak (born 1994), operatic soprano
- Mayra Muhammad-kyzy (born 1969), opera singer
- Ninety One (formed 2015), Qpop band
- Aisha Orazbayeva (born 1985), violinist
- Kairat Nurtas (born 1989), singer
- Makhambet Otemisuly (1804–1846), akyn, composer, leader of rebellious movement against Russian Empire
- Dimash Qudaibergen (born 1994), singer with songs in 13 languages
- Roza Rymbayeva (born 1957), singer
- Madina Saduakasova (born 1979), opera singer
- Kurmangazy Sagyrbaev (1823–1896), composer, instrumentalist and folk artist
- Altynay Sapargalieva (born 1989), singer
- Eldar Sattarov (born 1973)
- Scriptonite (born 1990), rapper, singer-songwriter
- Rinat Shakirov, (1962– ), pianist and composer
- Maira Shamsutdinova (1890–1927)
- Baluan Sholak (1864–1919), singer, composer
- Amir Tebenikhin (born 1977), pianist
- Bibigul Tulegenova (born 1929), opera singer
- Daneliya Tuleshova (born 2006), singer
- Kayrat Tuntekov (born 1986), singer
- Ulytau (formed 2001), Folk metal, Neo-classical metal
- Anastasiya Usova (born 1988), singer
- Tolkyn Zabirova (born 1970), singer
- Zhambyl Zhabayuly (1846–1945), Kazakh traditional folksinger
- Gaziza Zhubanova (1927–1993), composer
- Ziruza (born 1997), Q-pop singer
- Akmaral Zykayeva (born 1985), artist, singer-songwriter
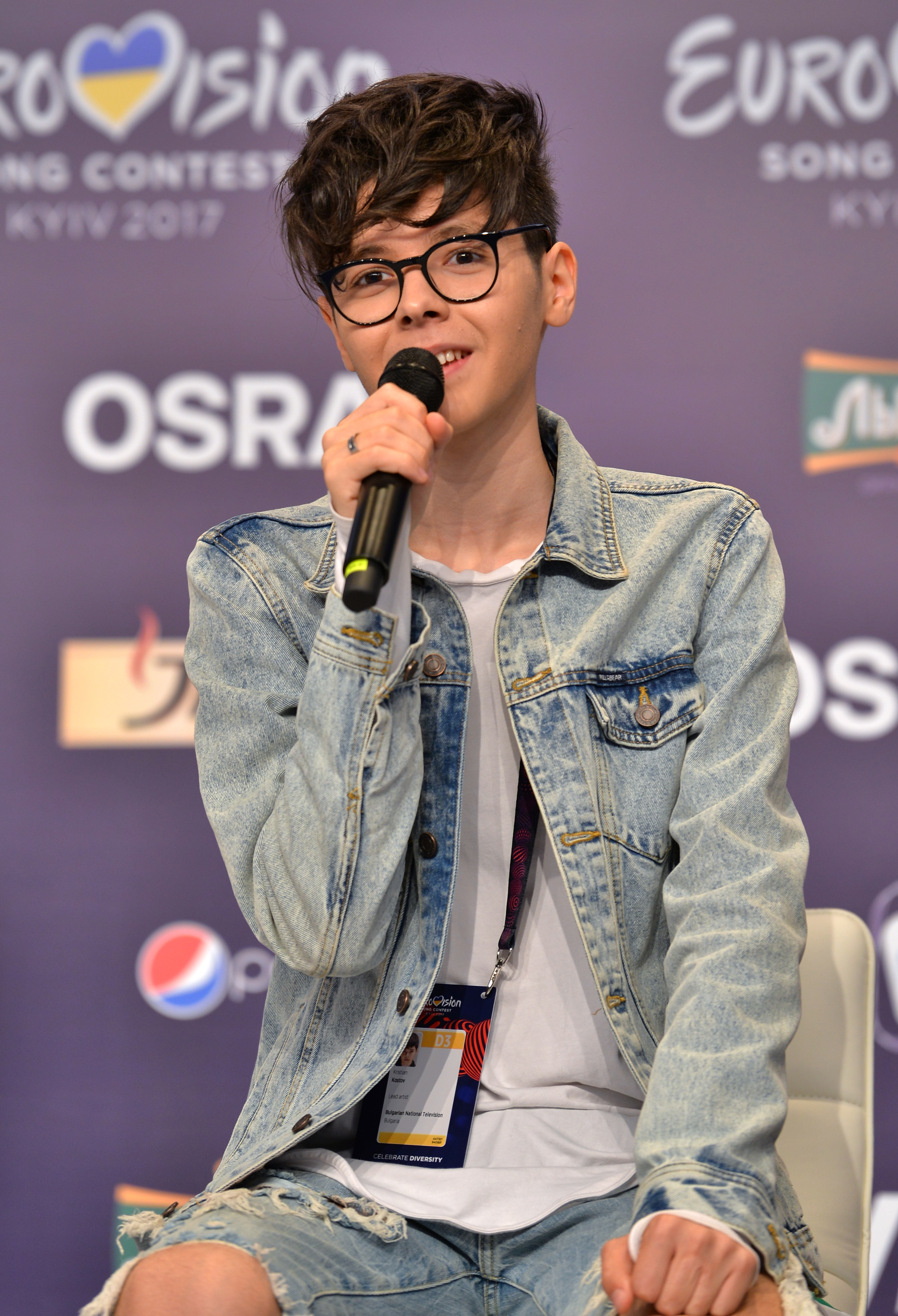
Kostov

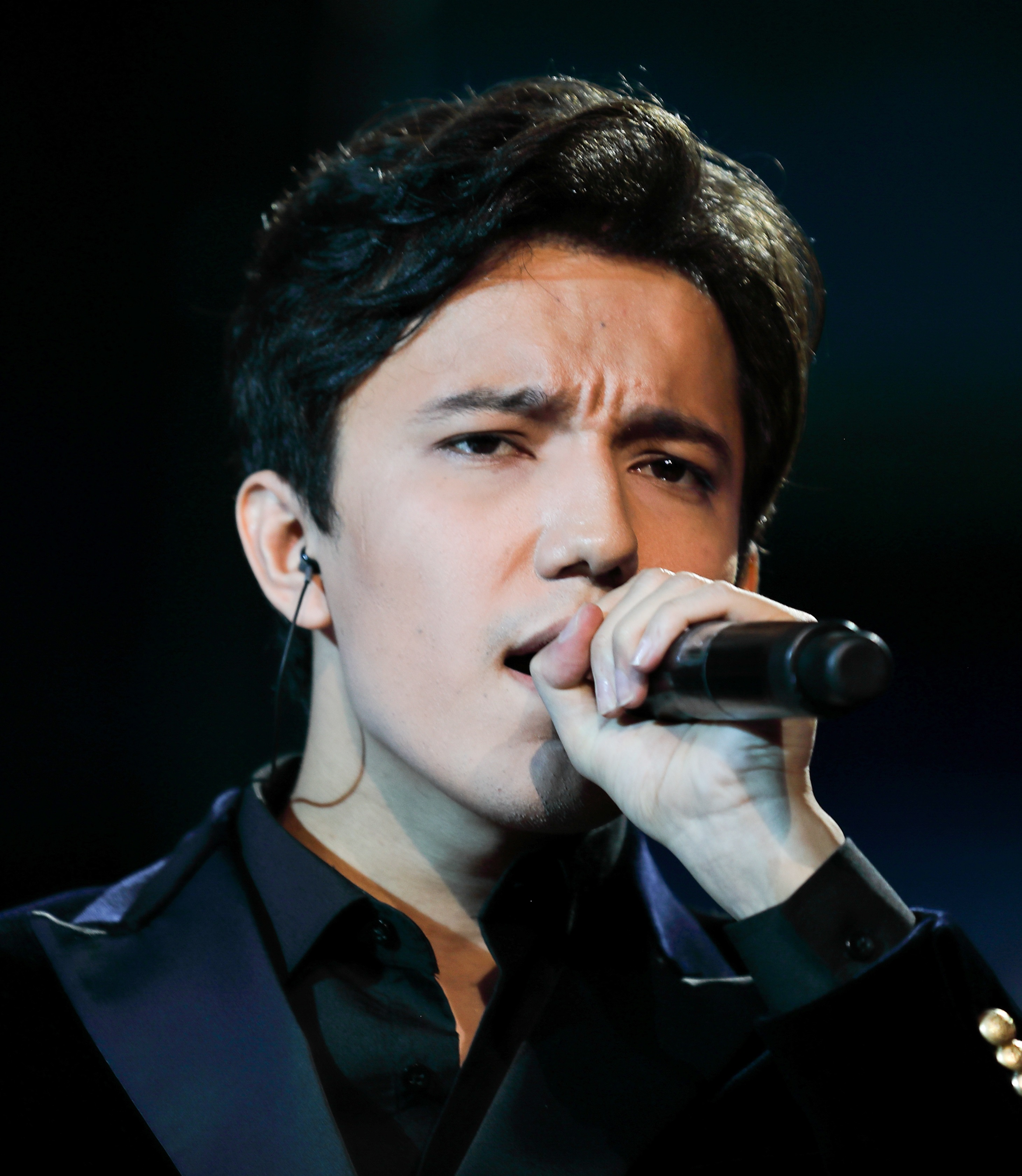
Qudaibergen

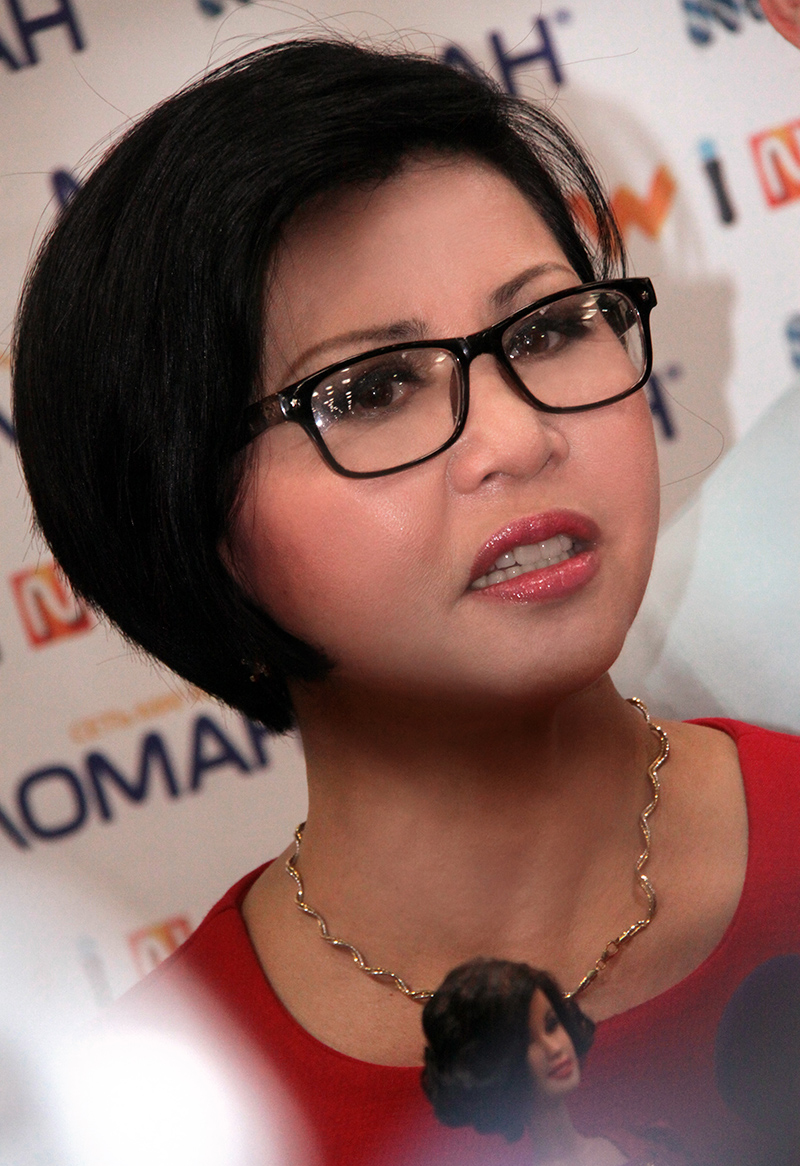
Rymbayeva

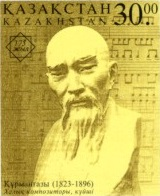
Sagyrbaev

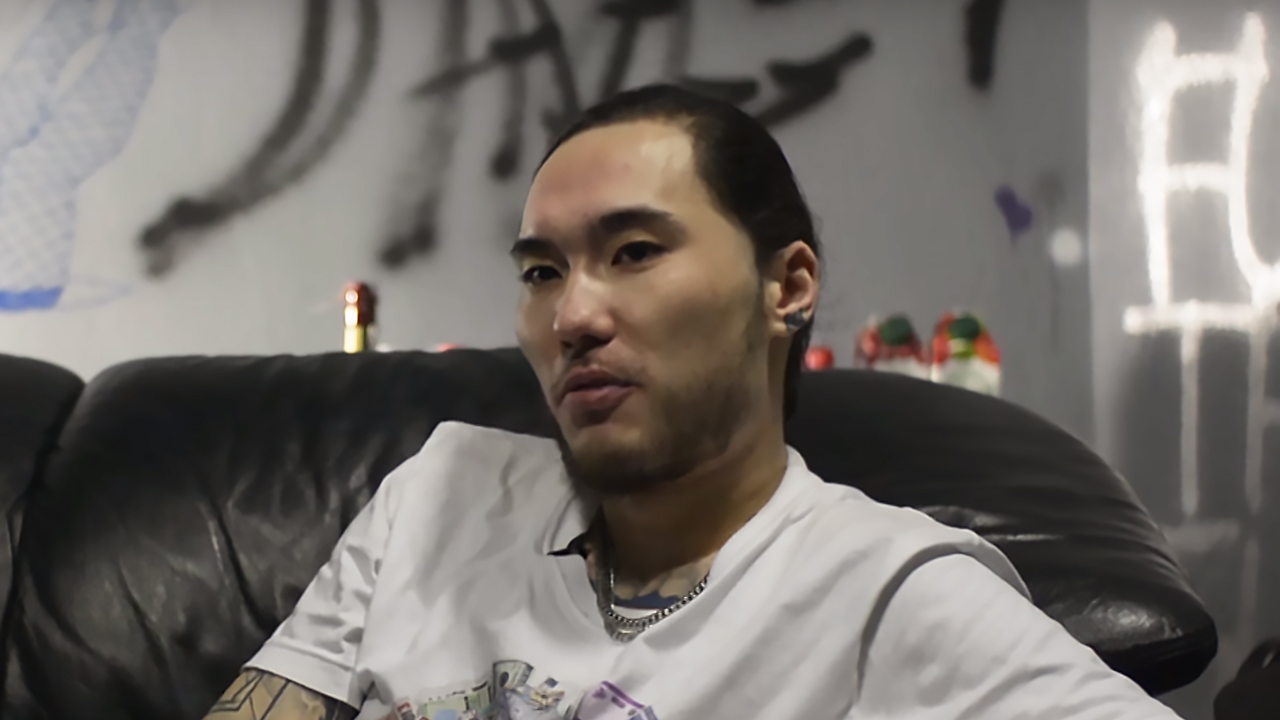
Scriptonite

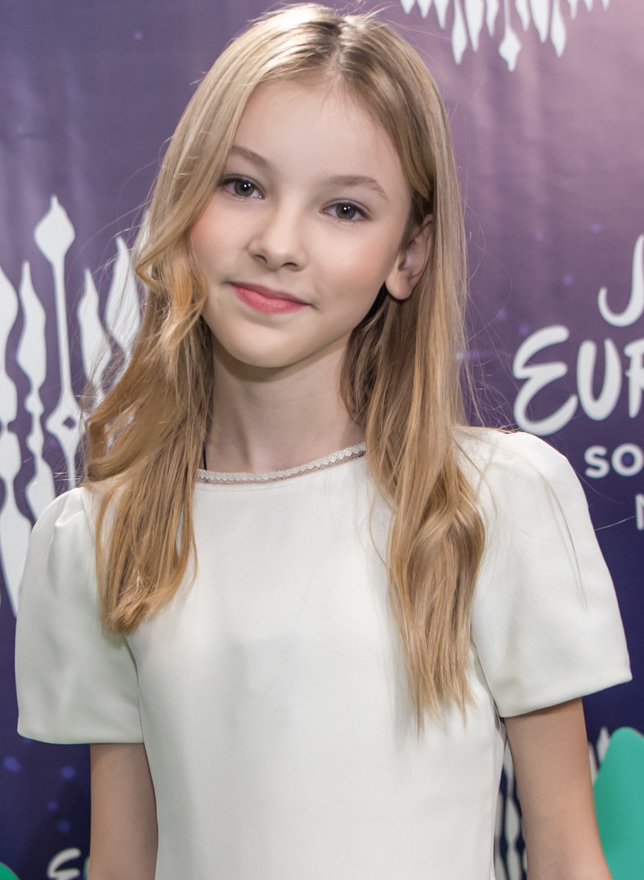
Tuleshova

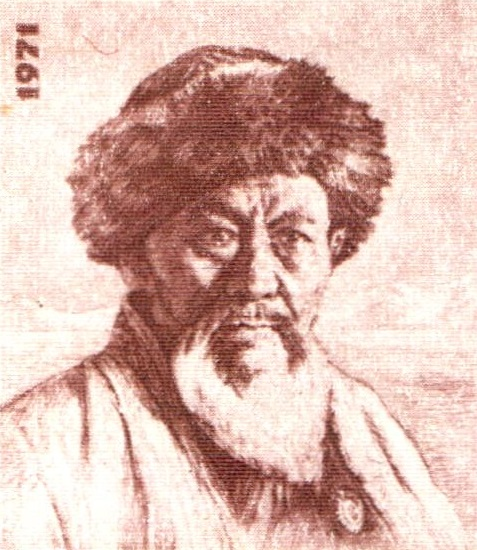
Zhabayuly

== Heads of state ==
- Abu'l-Mansur Khan (1711–1781), khan of Middle jüz, leader of Kazakh Khanate (1771–1781)
- Abu'l-Khair Muhammed Khan (1693–1748), khan of the Kazakh Junior jüz (1725–1748)
- Burunduk Khan (?–1511), leader of the Kazakh Khanate (1480–1510)
- Esim Khan (?–1628 (1643)), leader of the Kazakh Khanate (1598–1628 (1643))
- Janibek Khan (1428–1480), founder and co-leader of Kazakh Khanate (1465–1480)
- Qasim Khan (1445–1521), leader of the Kazakh Khanate (1510–1521)
- Muhammed Khan (1480–1523), leader of the Kazakh Khanate (1521–1523)
- Tahir Khan (?–1533), leader of the Kazakh Khanate (1523–1533)
- Ahmed Khan (?–1536), leader of the Kazakh Khanate (1533–1536)
- Haqnazar Khan (1509–1580), leader of the Kazakh Khanate (1538–1580)
- Salqam-Jahangir Khan (1610–1652), leader of the Kazakh Khanate (1643–1652)
- Kenesary Khan (1802–1847), khan of all three jüzes (1841–1847)
- Kerei Khan (?–1465), founder and co-leader of Kazakh Khanate (1456–1465)
- Tauke Khan (?–1718), leader of the Kazakh Khanate (1680–1718)
- Dinmukhamed Kunaev (1912–1993), First Secretary of the Communist Party of the Kazakh SSR (1960–1962, 1964–1986), Prime Minister, President Kazakhstan Academy of Sciences
- Nursultan Nazarbayev (born 1940), President of Kazakhstan
- Jumabay Shayahmetov (1902–1966), First Secretary of the Communist Party of the Kazakh SSR (1946–1954), former NKVD officer who participated in repressions against Kazakh people
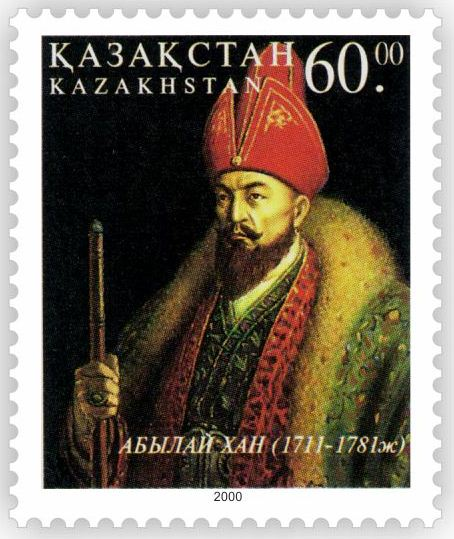
Ablai

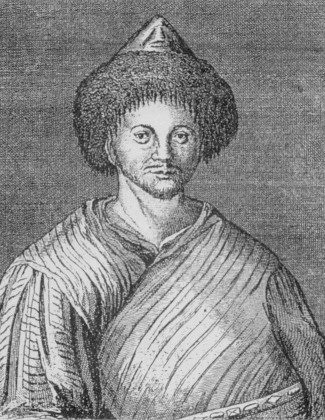
Abul Khair

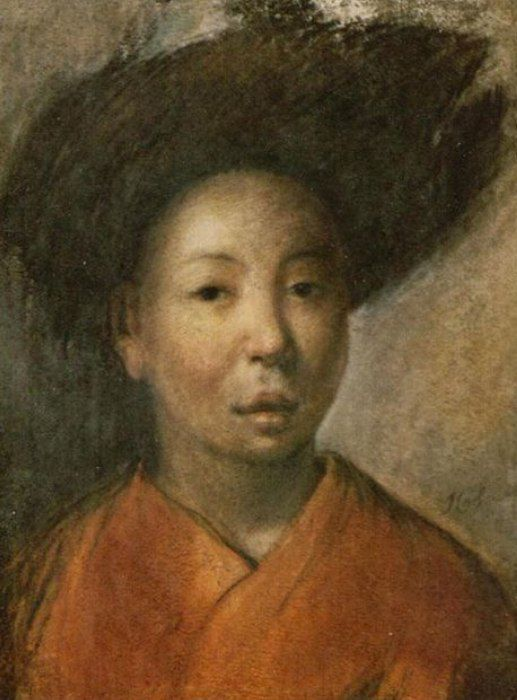
Eraly khan, son of Abul Khair Khan

== Philosophers ==
- Miftahetdin Akmulla (1831–1895), educator, poet and philosopher
- Shakarim Qudayberdiuli (1858–1931), poet, theologian, philosopher
- Ibrahim Qunanbaiuly (1845–1904), poet, translator, composer and philosopher.
- Ahmad Yasavi (1106–1166), poet and Sufi (Muslim mystic)

== Politicians and activists ==
- Vladimir Vasilyev (politician)
- Baurzhan Abdishev, Soviet army veteran and Kazakhstani politician
- Gulshara Abdykhalikova (born 1965), politician
- Byrganym Aitimova (born 1953), ambassador, minister, former Komsomol leader who supported Soviet government rogue actions against Kazakh people during Jeltoqsan
- Zhanar Aitzhanova (born 1965), politician, Permanent Representative of the Republic of Kazakhstan to the United Nations Office at Geneva
- Daniyal Akhmetov (born 1954), Prime Minister
- Akhmet Baitursynov (1873–1937), poet, writer and politician
- Nurlan Balgimbayev (1947–2015), Prime Minister
- Osman Bahadur (1899–1951), fighter for the freedom of the Kazakh people in Xinjiang
- Alikhan Bukeikhanov (1866–1937), writer, political activist and environmental scientist
- Tamara Duisenova (born 1965), politician, e Minister of Labour and Social Protection of the Population
- Mir Yaqub Dulatuli (1885–1935), poet, writer and a leader of Alash Orda government
- Kabibulla Dzhakupov, former Chair of the Mazhilis from 2014 to 2016
- Janabil (1934–2024), politician in China
- Guljan Karagusova (born 1950), member of Majilis, Minister of Labour and Social Protection
- Ashat Kerimbay (born 1947), politician in China
- Oralbeg Abdu Kerimovic, Secretary General of the government of Kazakhstan
- Yurii Khitrin, Prosecutor General
- Dinmukhamed Kunaev (1912–1993), soviet politician, First Secretary of the Kazakh Communist Party between 1960–1962 and 1964–1986
- Muhambet Kopeev (born 1949), Kazakh senator, former Deputy Chairman of the Senate of Kazakhstan and Mazhilis, former Minister of Emergency Situations
- Eset Kotibaruli (1803–1889), leader of the anti-colonial war against Russian Empire
- Mukhtar Kul-Mukhammed (born 1960), senator, former Deputy Chairman of the Nur Otan, and former advisor to the President of Kazakhstan
- Asqar Mamin (born 1965), former Prime Minister
- Karim Massimov (born 1965), former Prime Minister
- Nursultan Nazarbayev (born 1940), first President of Kazakhstan and founder of the Nur Otan party
- Bolat Nurgaliyev (born 1951), diplomat
- Makhambet Otemisuly (1804–1846), akyn, composer, leader of rebellious movement against Russian Empire
- Toleutai Raqymbekov (born 1964), politician
- Qairat Rysqulbekov (1966–1988), participant in Jeltoqsan protests, posthumous Hero of Kazakhstan
- Kanat Saudabayev (born 1946), politician, Secretary of State, Minister of Foreign Affairs
- Mustafa Shokay (1890–1941), leader of the Kokand revolt (1917) against the Bolsheviks
- Älihan Smaiylov (born 1972), current Prime Minister
- Oljas Suleimenov (born 1936), poet, politician, and anti-nuclear activist
- Imangali Tasmagambetov (born 1956), Prime Minister
- Isatay Taymanuly (1791–1838), leader of rebellious movement against Russian Empire
- Marat Tazhin (born 1960), Foreign Minister
- Kassym-Jomart Tokayev (born 1953), Foreign Minister, Prime Minister, and current President of Kazakhstan
- Janseiıt Tüimebaev (born 1958), Minister of Education and Science
- Aman Tuleyev (born 1944), governor of Kemerovo Oblast, Russia
- Mukhamedzhan Tynyshpaev (1879–1953), Kazakh engineer, ethnographer, historian, and political activist
- Akhmetzhan Yessimov (born 1960), Kazakh politician and former chairman of Samruk-Kazyna
- Adilbek Zhaksybekov (born 1954), politician, State Secretary, Minister
- Sayragul Sauytbay (born 1977), physician, headteacher, whistleblower and political activist from China about the persecution of Uyghurs in China, she was now based in Washington DC and elected as a Vice President of East Turkistan Government-in-Exile
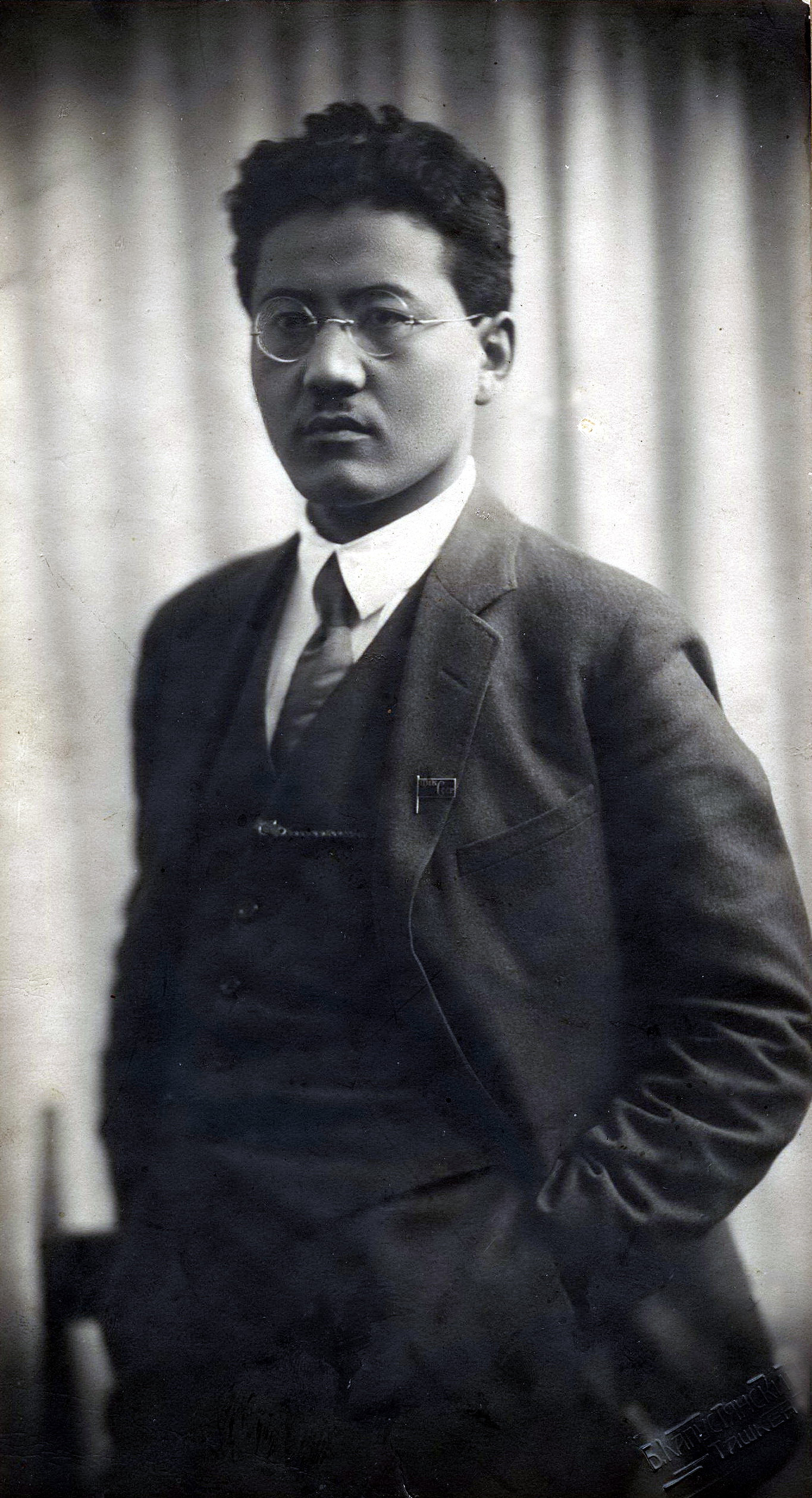
Ryskulov

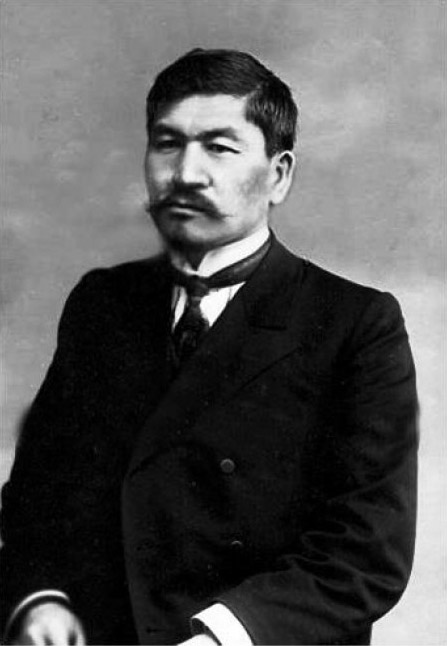
Bukeikhanov

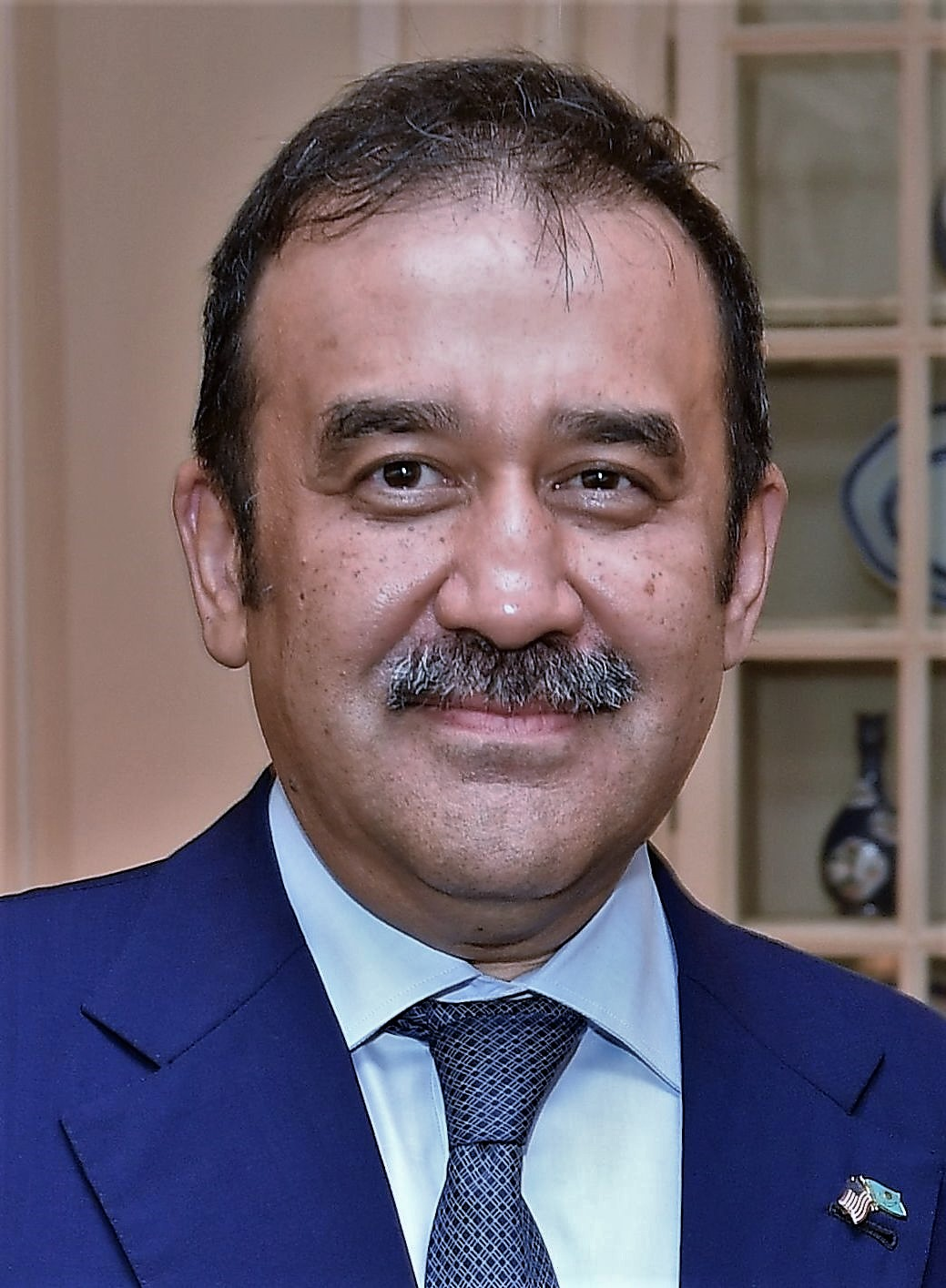
Massimov

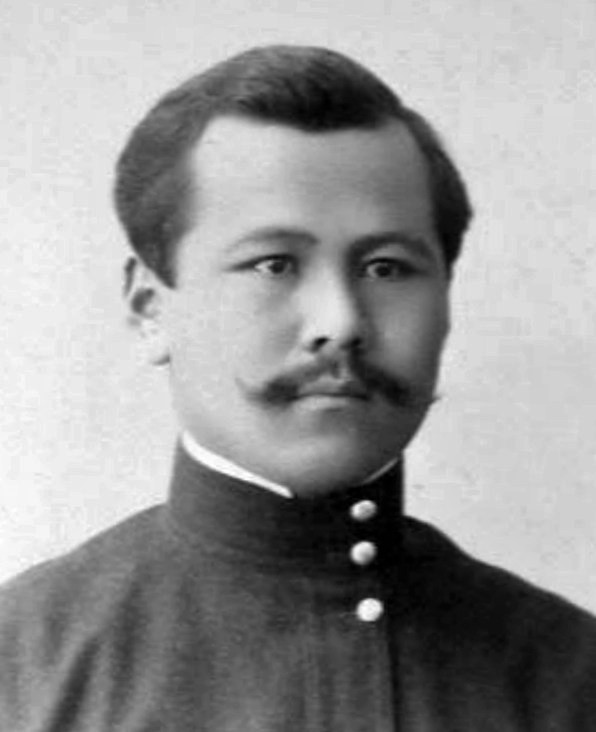
Shokay

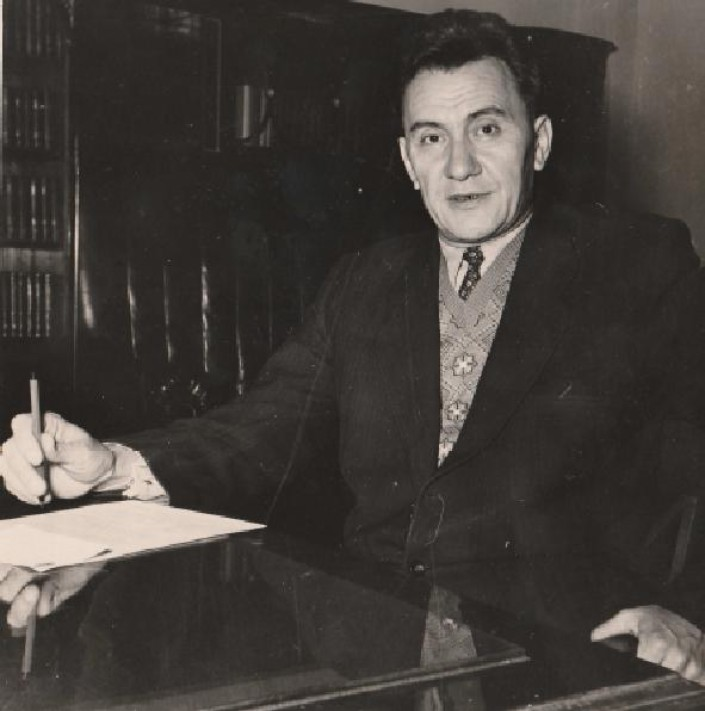
Kunayev

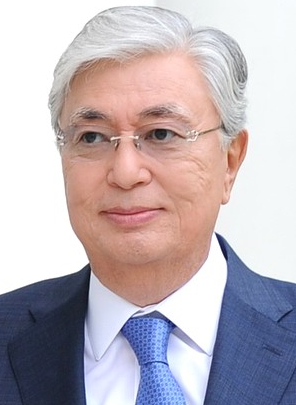
Tokayev

== Military ==
- Nurken Abdirov (1919–1942), fighter pilot, Hero of the Soviet Union
- Galiy Adilbekov (1908–1943), The only Kazakh tank brigade commander of World War II
- Aidyn Aimbetov (born 1972), fighter pilot and cosmonaut
- Toktar Aubakirov (born 1946), first Kazakh in space, MP
- Mukhtar Aymakhanov (born 1967), cosmonaut
- Rahim-Bek Bahadur (1705–?), warrior in the 18th century against Dzungars
- Nasrullah Nauryzbai Bahadur (1706–1781), Kazakh commander in the 18th century who fought against the Dzungars
- Murat Bektanov (born 1965), Minister of Defence
- Talgat Bigeldinov (1922–2014), Il-2 pilot, only Kazak twice awarded Hero of the Soviet Union
- Syrym Datuly (1712–1802), leader of the Kazakhs of the Junior Jüz
- Khiuaz Dospanova (1922–2008), aviation navigator, officer in the "night witches"
- Raziya Iskakova (1922–2010), recipient of the Florence Nightingale Medal
- Murat Maikeyev (born 1959), military figure
- Manshuk Mametova (1922–1943), World War II machine gunner, posthumous Hero of the Soviet Union
- Jaqipbek Maldybayev, (1907–1938), the first Kazakh combat pilot
- Aliya Moldagulova (1925–1944), female Soviet sniper during World War II
- Bauırjan Momyshuly (1910–1982), writer, posthumous Hero of the Soviet Union for actions in World War II
- Talgat Musabayev (born 1951), test pilot, former cosmonaut, Director of Aerospace Agency of Republic of Kazakhstan
- Sagadat Nurmagambetov (1924–2013), Soviet and Kazakh general
- Qasim Qaysenov (1918—2006), Kazakh partisan detachment commander during World War II
- Rahimjan Qoshqarbaev (1924–1988), first soldier to raise the Soviet flag in the Reichstag
- Ibragim Suleymanov (1911–1943), sniper of World War II and Hero of Kazakhstan
- Saken Zhasuzakov (born 1957), Minister of Defence
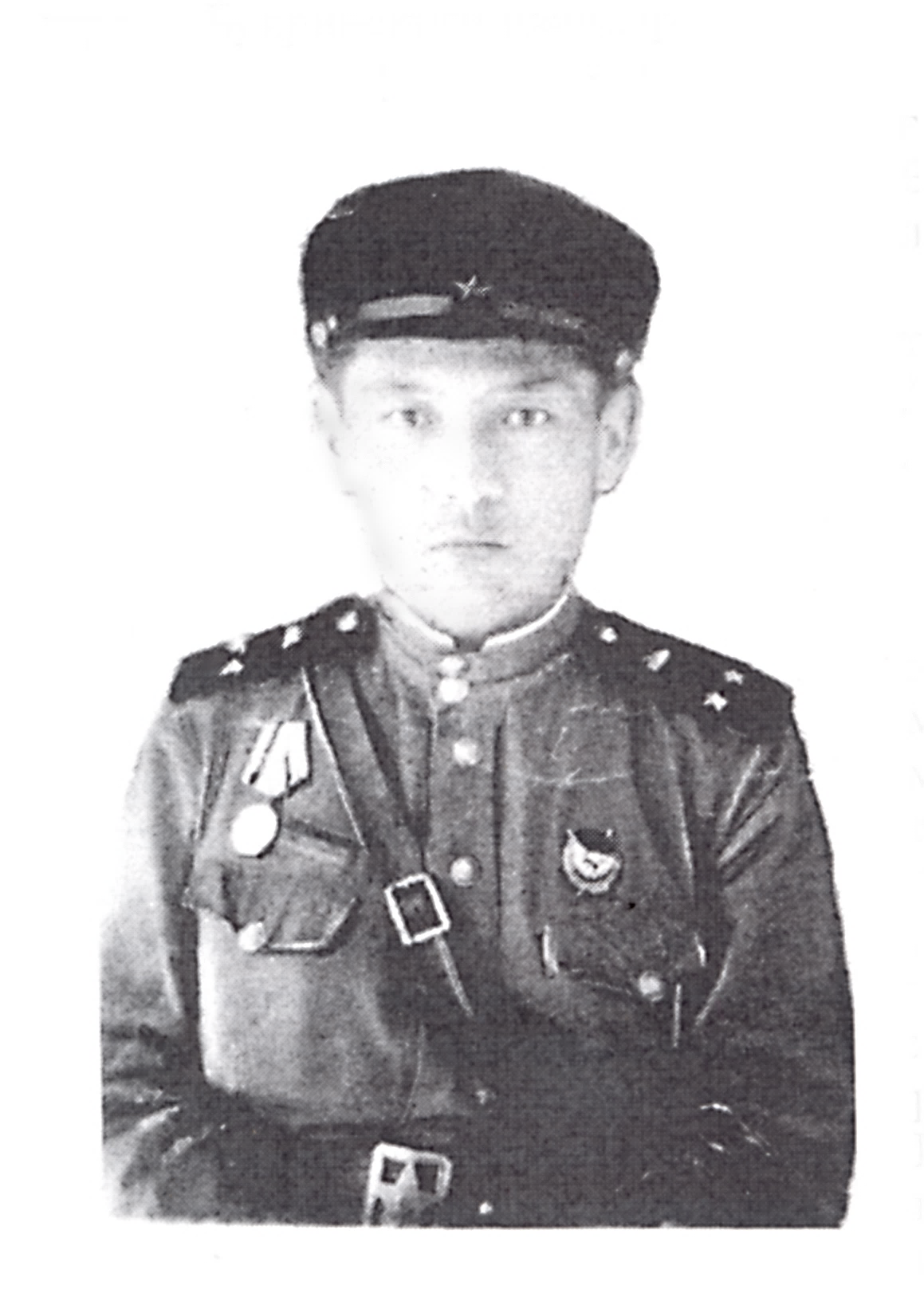
Adilbekov

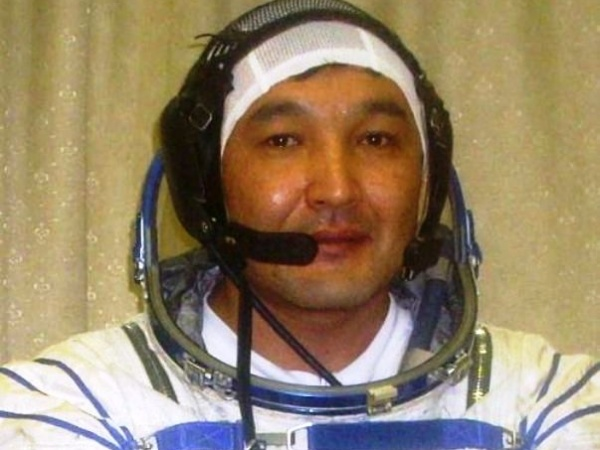
Aimbetov

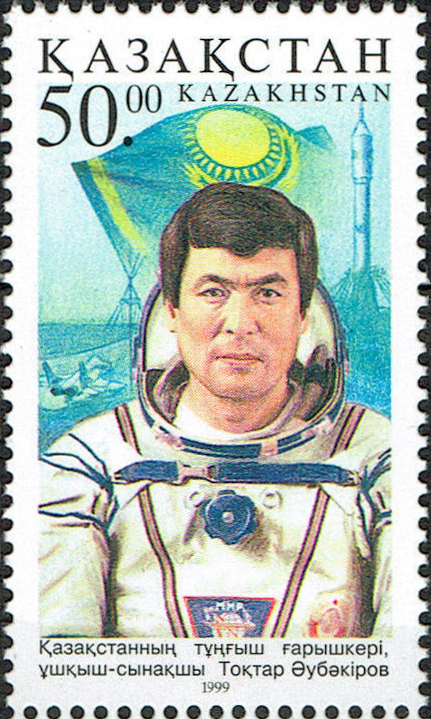
Aubakirov

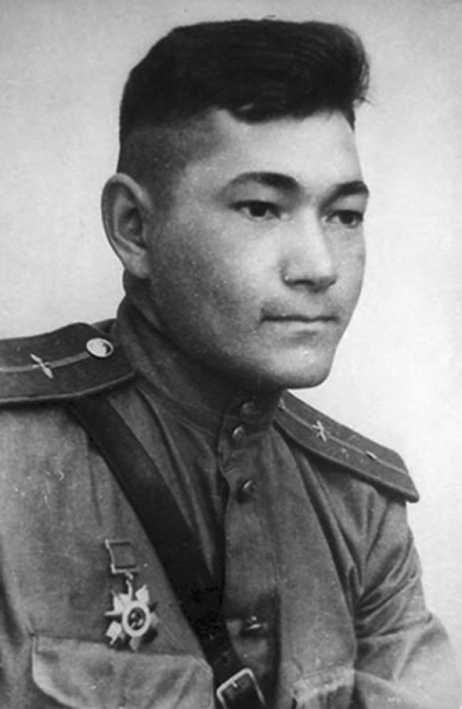
Bigeldinov

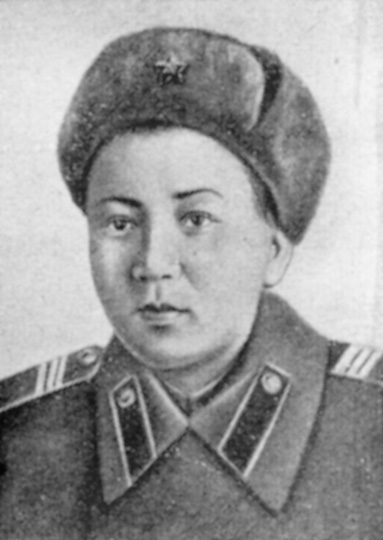
Mametova

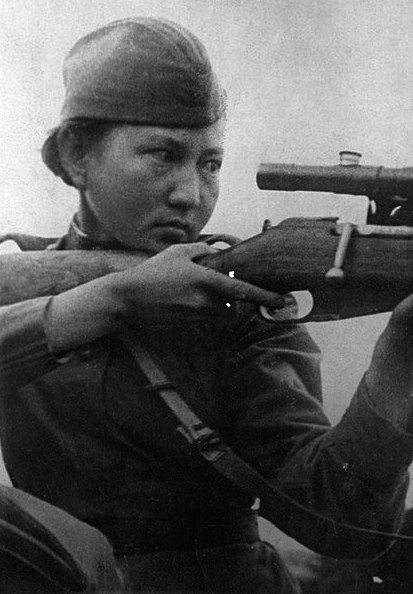
Moldagulova

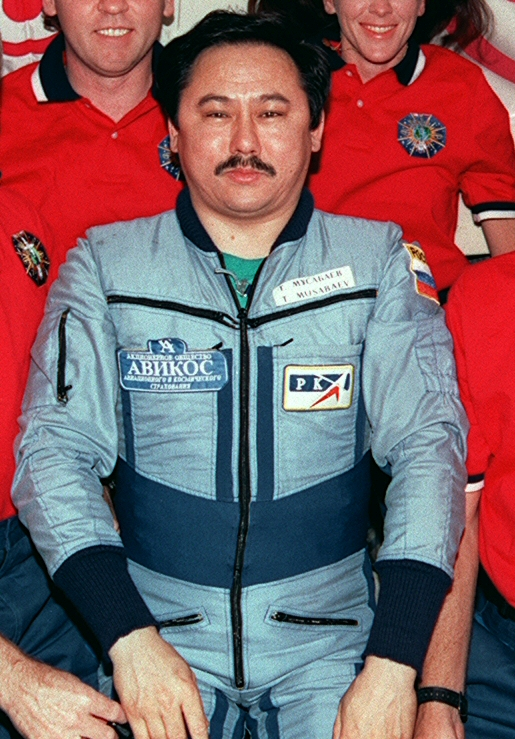
Musabayev

== Rulers ==
=== Kazakh Khans before the jüzs split ===
- Kerei (1456–1473)
- Janibek (1473–1480)
- Burunduk (1480–1511)
- Qasim (1511–1518)
- Muhammed (1518–1523)
- Tahir (1523–1533)
- Ahmed (1533–1535)
- Haqnazar (1538–1580)
- Jangir (1628–1652)
- Tauke (1680–1715)
- Abu'l-Mansur (1771–1781)
- Kenesary (1841–1847)

=== Junior jüz khans ===
- Abu'l-Khair (1718–1748)
- Nur Ali (1748–1786)

=== Middle jüz khans ===
- Abu'l-Mansur (1771–1781)

== Scientists ==
- Serikbolsyn Abdildin (1937–2019), economist and politician
- Maukhida Abdulkabirova (1917–2003), geologist and metallurgist
- Zinesh Abisheva (1947–2021), metallurgist
- Murat Aitkhozhin (1939–1987), molecular biologist
- Kimal Akishev (1924–2003), scientist, archeologist, and historian
- Ken Alibek (born 1950), microbiologist
- Sarsen Amanzholov (1903–1958), linguist, Turkologist
- Gulsum Asfendiyarova (1880–1937), medical doctor, health care system organizer
- Kaisha Atakhanova (born 1957), genetic biologist
- Shafik Chokin (1912–2003), engineer, President of Academy of Sciences
- Mirza Muhammad Haidar Dughlat (1499/1500–1551), historian, Chagatai Turco-Mongol military general
- Askar Dzhumadildayev (born 1956), mathematician
- Orazak Ismagulov (born 1930), anthropologist
- Zhenis Kembayev (born 1975), jurist
- Khalida Mamanova, professor, medical doctor, and participant in the Second World War
- Tasbolat Mukhametkaliev (1937–2019), scientist
- Abilbek Nurmagambetov (1927–1998), linguist-etymologist
- Marat Sarsembaev (born 1947), jurist
- Kanysh Satbayev (1899–1964), engineer, geologist, President of Academy of Sciences
- Mukhamedzhan Tynyshpaev (1879–1937), engineer, enthnographer, historian, activist
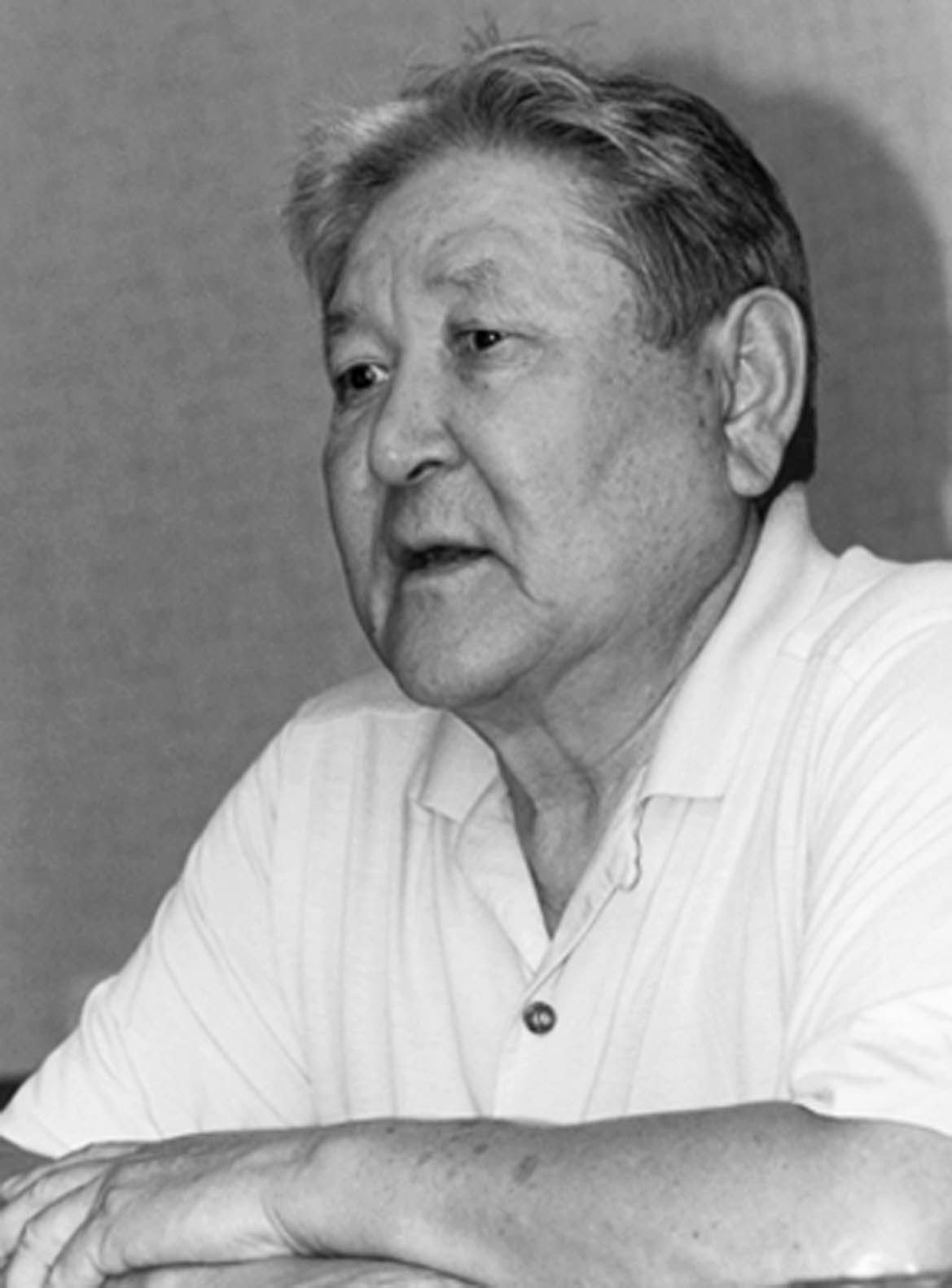
Abdildin

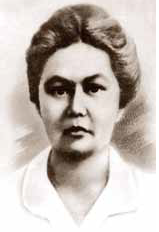
Asfendiyarova

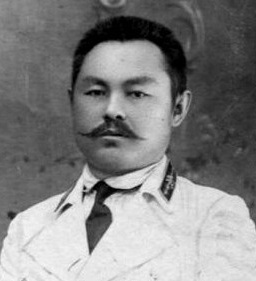
Tynyshpaev

== Sportspersons ==
=== Boxers ===
- Ruslan Abdullaev (born 2002) – champion of the 2023 World Championships
- Merey Akshalov (born 1988) – boxer, champion of the 2013 World Championships
- Janibek Alimkhanuly – (born 1993) – boxer, champion of the 2013 World Championships
- Bakhtiyar Artayev (born 1983) – champion of the 2004 Summer Olympics
- Saken Bibossinov (born 1997) – boxer, champion of the 2021 World Championships, bronze medalist at 2019 World Championships and bronze medal winner of the 2020 Summer Olympics
- Mukhtarkhan Dildabekov (born 1976) – silver medal winner of the 2000 Summer Olympics
- Yermakhan Ibraimov (born 1972) – bronze medal winner of the 1996 Summer Olympics, champion of the 2000 Summer Olympics
- Kanat Islam (born 1984) – bronze medal winner of the 2008 Summer Olympics, WBA Inter-Continental, WBO NABO, WBO Inter-Continental, WBA Fedelatin, WBA Fedecaribe Super welterweight
- Serik Konakbayev (born 1959) – silver medal winner of the 1980 Summer Olympics
- Kamshybek Kunkabayev – bronze medal winner of the 2020 Summer Olympics
- Nazym Kyzaibay (born 1993) – boxer, champion of the 2014 and 2016 World Championships, bronze medal winner of the 2024 Summer Olympics
- Adilbek Niyazymbetov– silver medal winner of the 2012 Summer Olympics, 2016 Summer Olympics
- Bulat Niyazymbetov (born 1972) – bronze medal winner of the 1996 Summer Olympics
- Bekzad Nurdauletov (born 1998) – boxer, champion of the 2019 World Championships
- Nurbek Oralbay (born 2000) – champion of the 2023 World Championships
- Makhmud Sabyrkhan (born 2001) – boxer, gold at 2023 World Championships
- Serik Sapiyev (born 1983) – boxer, champion of the 2012 Summer Olympics, champion of the 2005 World Championships, 2007 World Championships, bronze medalist 2009 World Championships, silver medalist 2011 World Championships
- Bakhyt Sarsekbayev (born 1981) – champion of the 2008 Summer Olympics
- Bekzat Sattarkhanov (1980–2000) – champion of the 2000 Summer Olympics
- Dariga Shakimova (born 1988) – bronze medal winner of the 2016 Summer Olympics
- Zhaina Shekerbekova (born 1989) – boxer, won a silver medal at the 2018 World Championships
- Aslanbek Shymbergenov (born 1991) – gold at 2023 World Championships
- Yerkebulan Shynaliyev (born 1987) – bronze medal winner of the 2008 Summer Olympics
- Sanzhar Tashkenbay (born 2003) – boxer, champion of the 2023 World Championships
- Kairat Yeraliyev (born 1990) – boxer, champion of the 2017 World Championships and bronze medalist at 2013 World Championships
- Daniyar Yeleussinov (born 1991) – champion of the 2016 Summer Olympics, champion of the 2015 World Championships and silver medalist at 2013 World Championships
- Serik Yeleuov (born 1980) – bronze medal winner of the 2004 Summer Olympics
- Zhanat Zhakiyanov (born 1983) – former professional boxer WBA (Undisputed) and IBO bantamweight titles
- Birzhan Zhakypov (born 1984) – champion of the 2013 World Championships and bronze at 2005 World Championships
- Yerdos Zhanabergenov (born 1983) – champion of the 2005 World Amateur Boxing Championships
- Dina Zholaman – boxer, won a gold medal at the 2016 World Championships
- Bulat Zhumadilov (born 1973) – silver medal winner of the 1996 Summer Olympics and 2000 Summer Olympics, gold medal at the 1999 World Championships, silver medal at the 1995 World Championships, bronze medal at the 1997 World Championships
- Ablaikhan Zhussupov (born 1997) – bronze medal winner of the 2021 AIBA World Boxing Championships
- Temirtas Zhussupov (born 2003) – boxer, champion of the 2021 World Championships
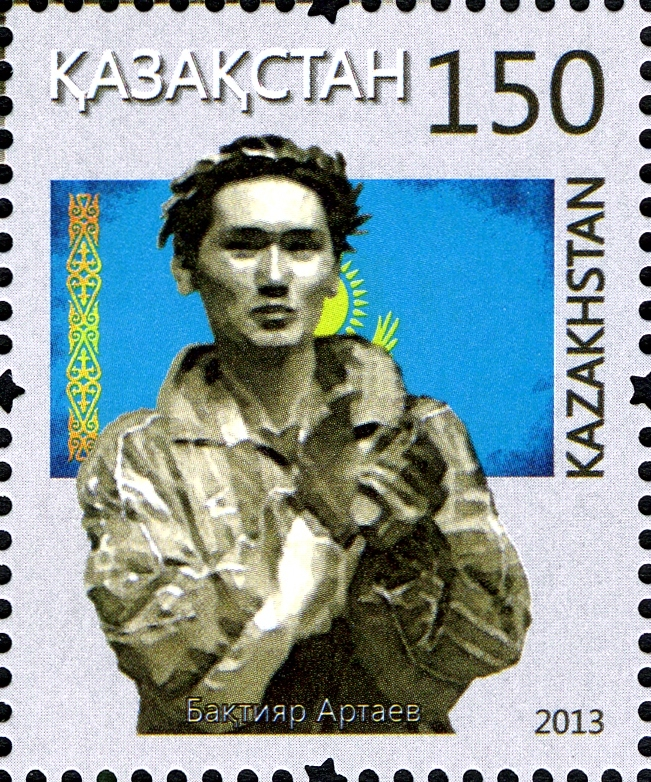
Artayev

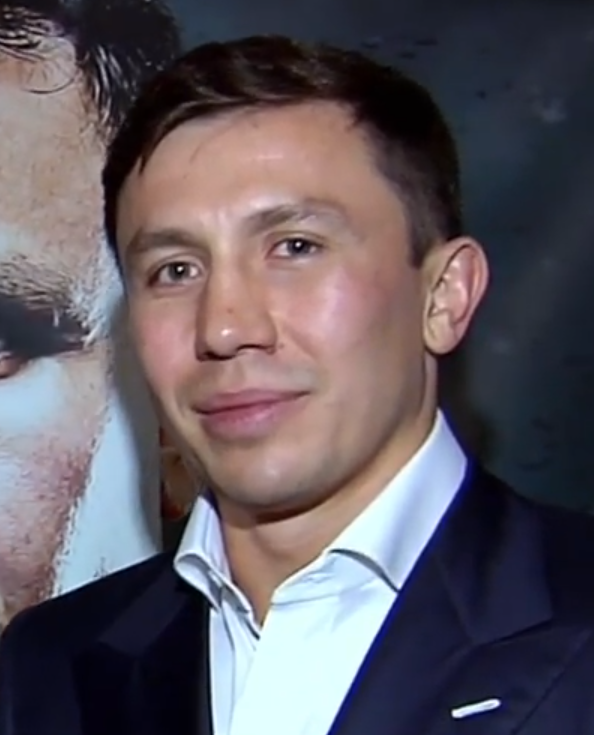
Golovkin

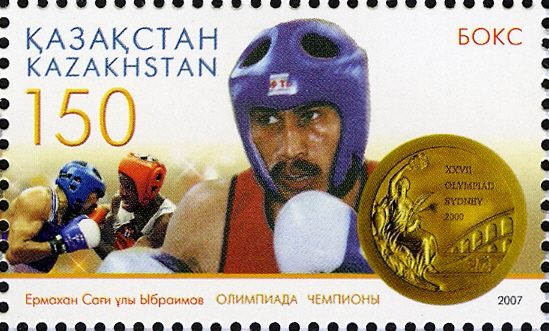
Ibraimov

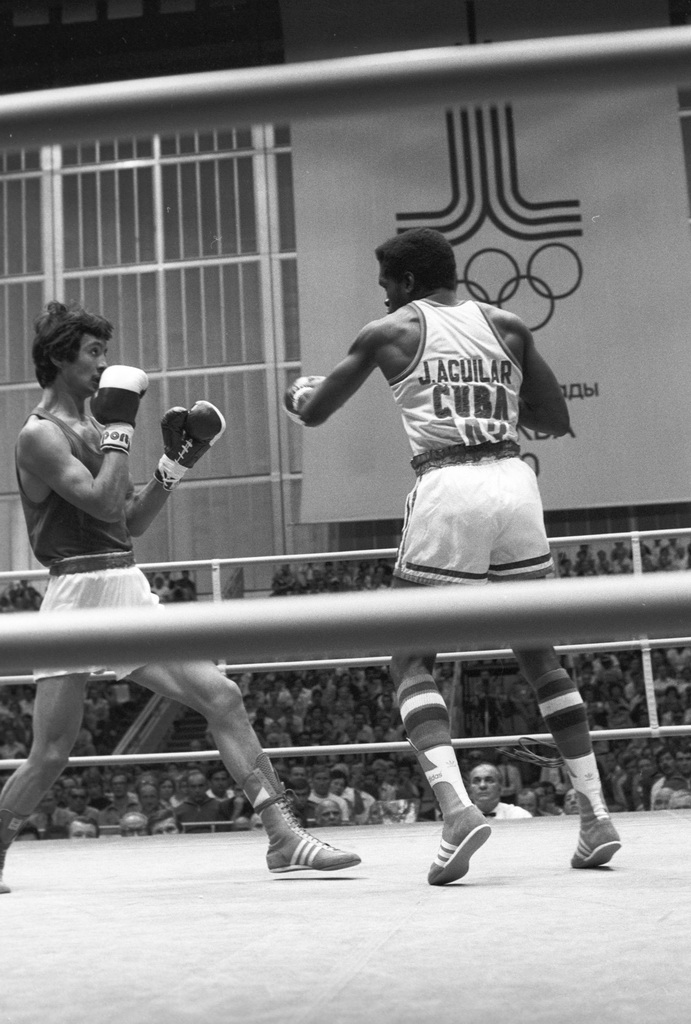
Konakbayev

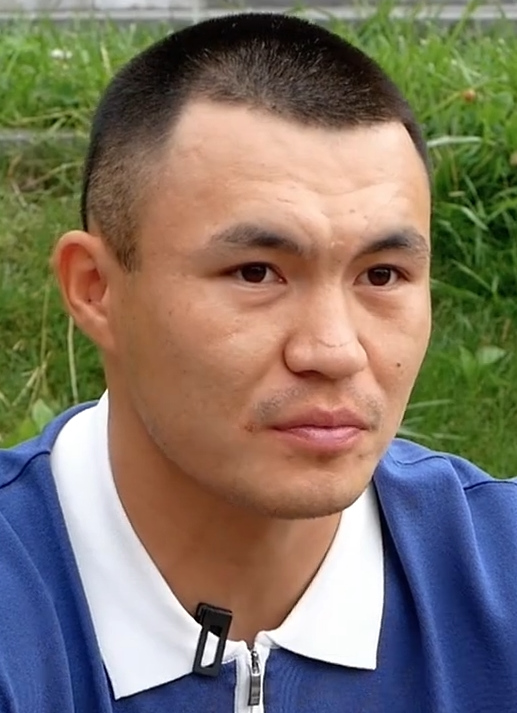
Kunkabayev

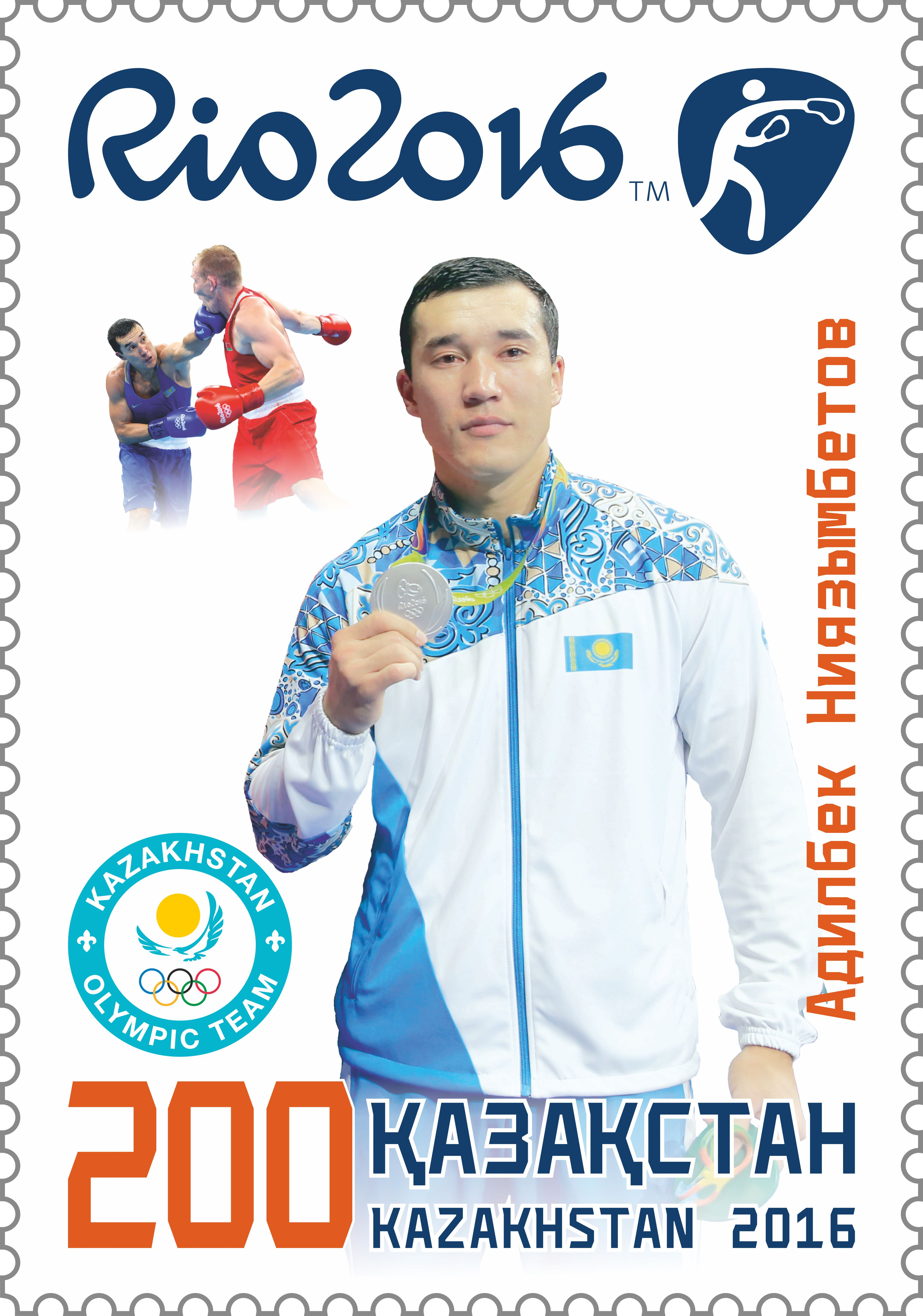
Niyazymbetov

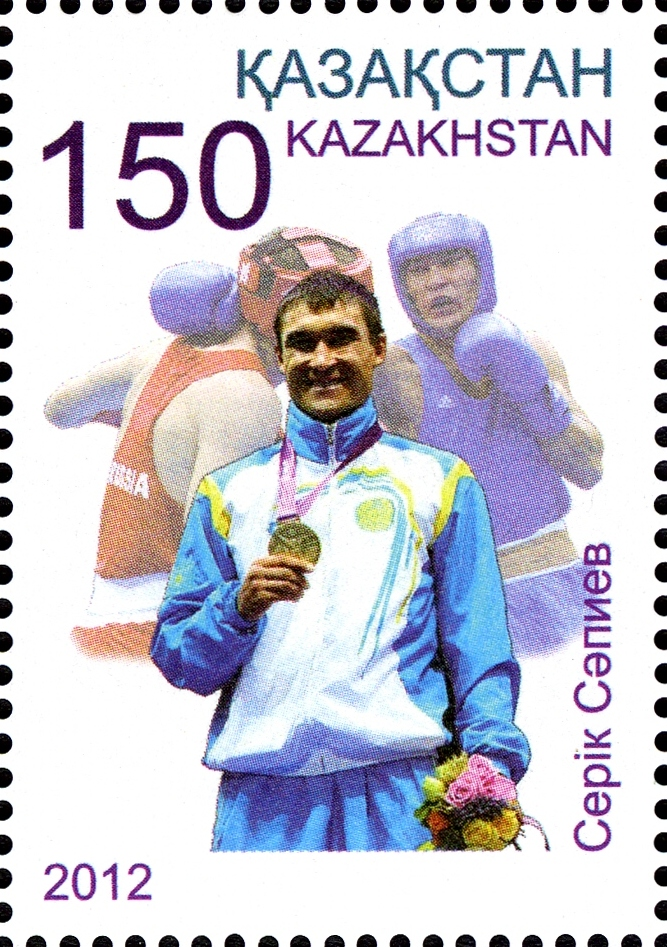
Sapiyev

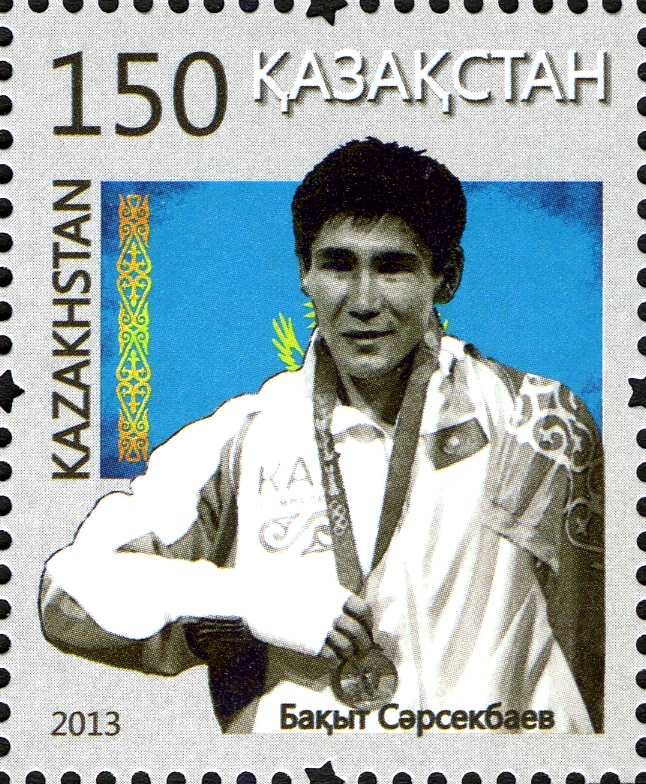
Sarsekbayev

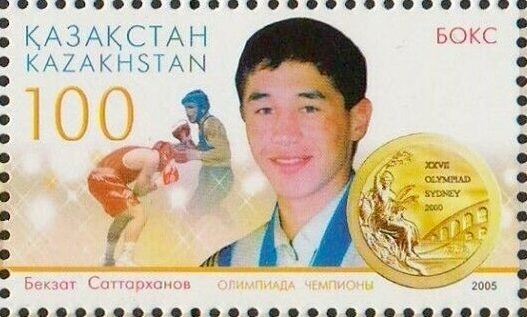
Sattarkhanov

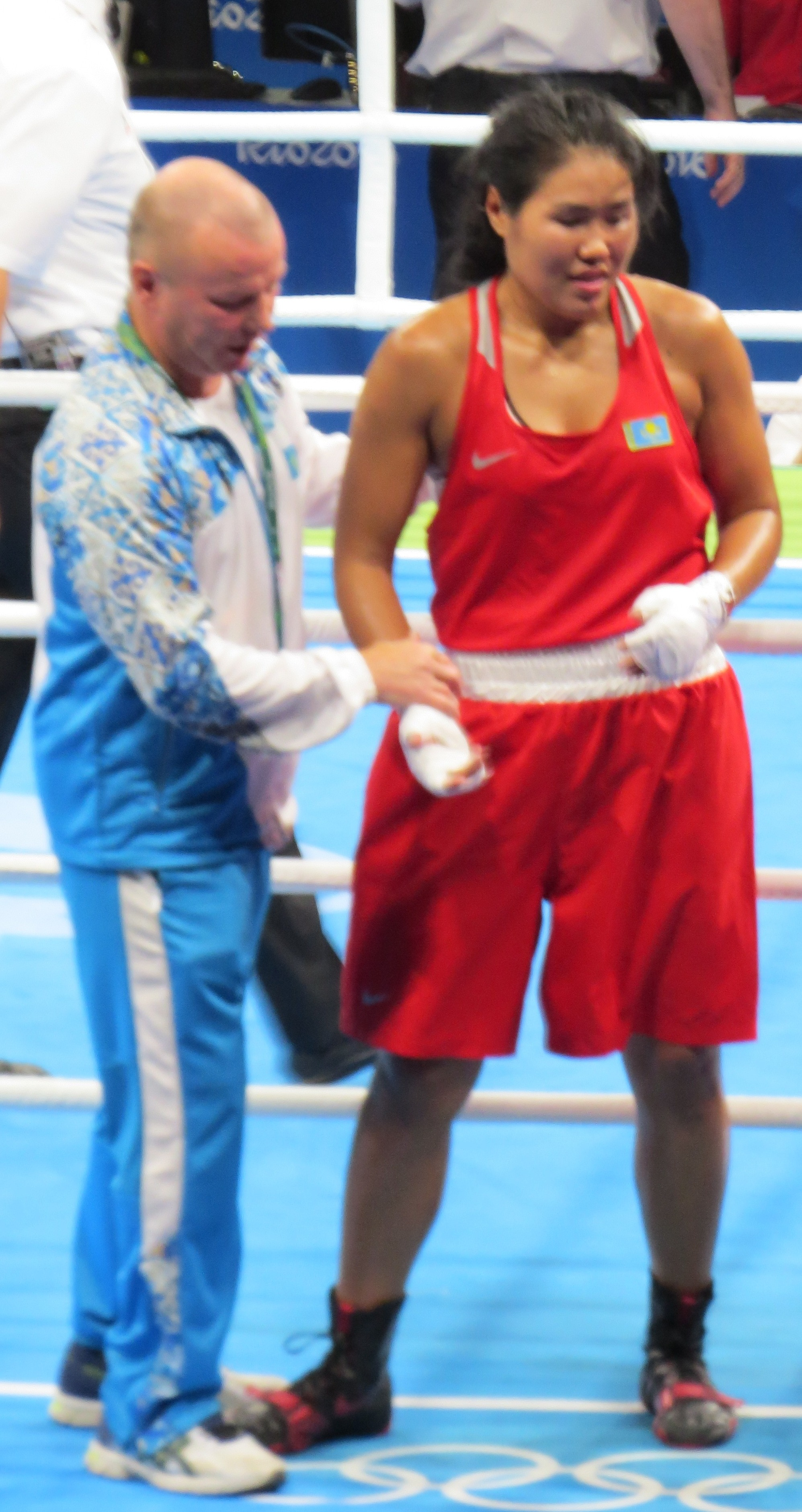
Shakimova

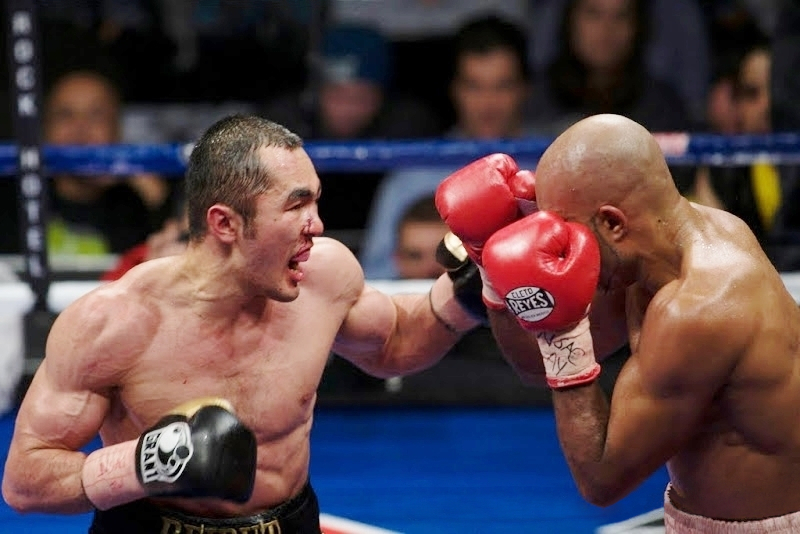
Shumenov

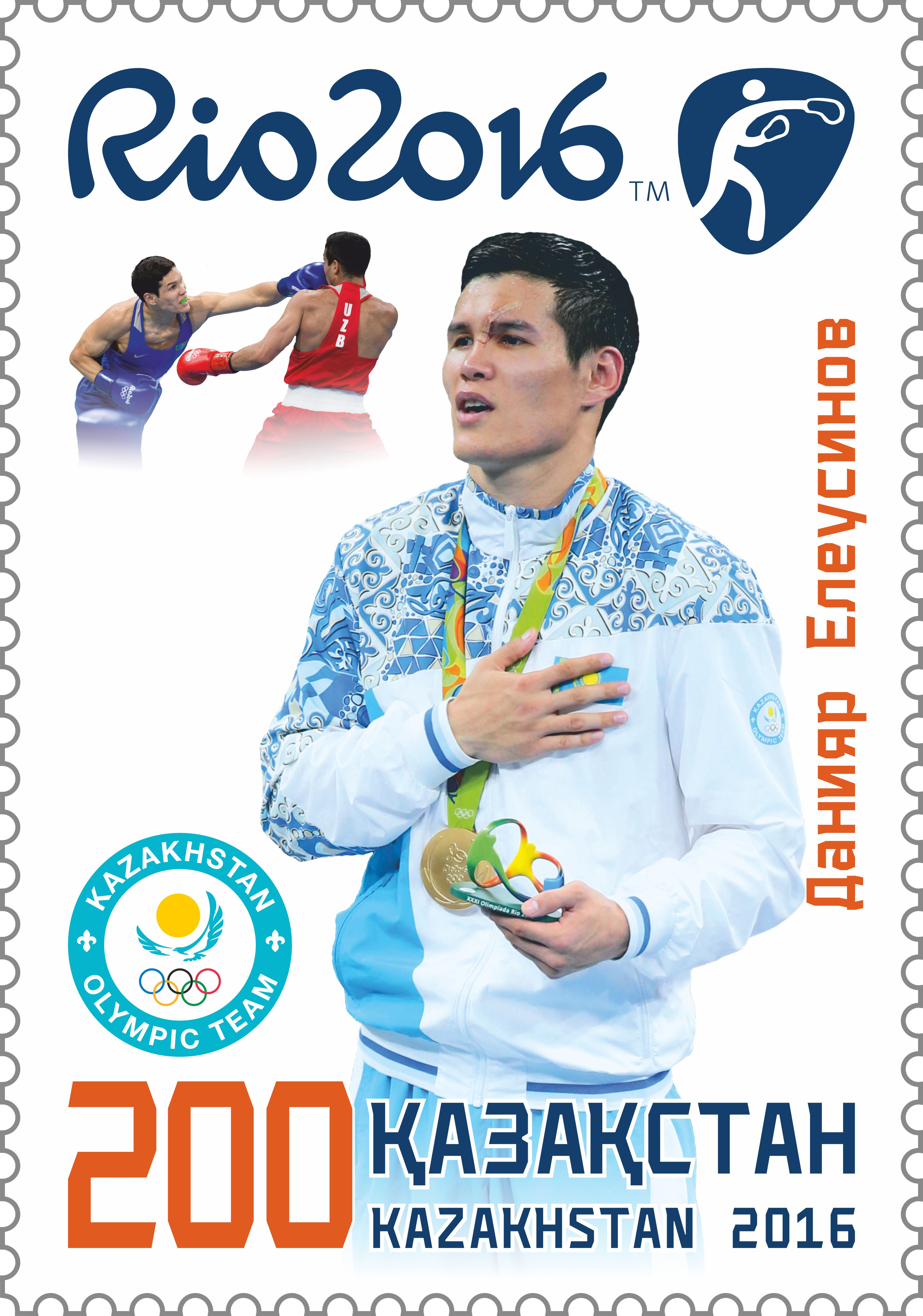
Yeleussinov

=== Wrestling ===
==== Greek-Roman (Classic) style ====
- Meirambek Ainagulov – silver medal winner of the 2017 World Championships
- Bakhtiyar Baiseitov – champion of the 1998 World Championships
- Almat Kebispayev – won a silver medal at the 2011 World Championships
- Asset Mambetov – bronze medal winner of the 2008 Summer Olympics
- Kazhymukan Munaitpasov (1871–1948) – first Kazakh who won a World Championship in 1908
- Aytjan Khalmakhanov– champion of the 2025 World Championships
- Walihan Sailike – bronze medals winner in the 2018 World Championships and 2020 Summer Olympics
- Meirzhan Shermakhanbet – bronze medal winner of the 2018 World Championships
- Shamil Serikov (1956–1989) – champion of the 1980 Summer Olympics, champion of the 1978 World Championships, 1979 World Championships
- Aidos Sultangali – champion of the 2025 World Championships and two bronze medals winner at the 2018 and 2022
- Elmurat Tasmuradov – bronze medal winner of the 2016 Summer Olympics
- Nurbakyt Tengizbayev – silver medal winner of the 2008 Summer Olympics
- Zhaksylyk Ushkempirov (1951–2020) – champion of the 1980 Summer Olympics and 1981 World Championships
- Demeu Zhadrayev – won a silver medal at the 2017 World Championships
- Khorlan Zhakansha – won a silver medal at the 2019 World Championships
- Dauren Zhumagaziyev – won a silver medal at the 2011 World Championships
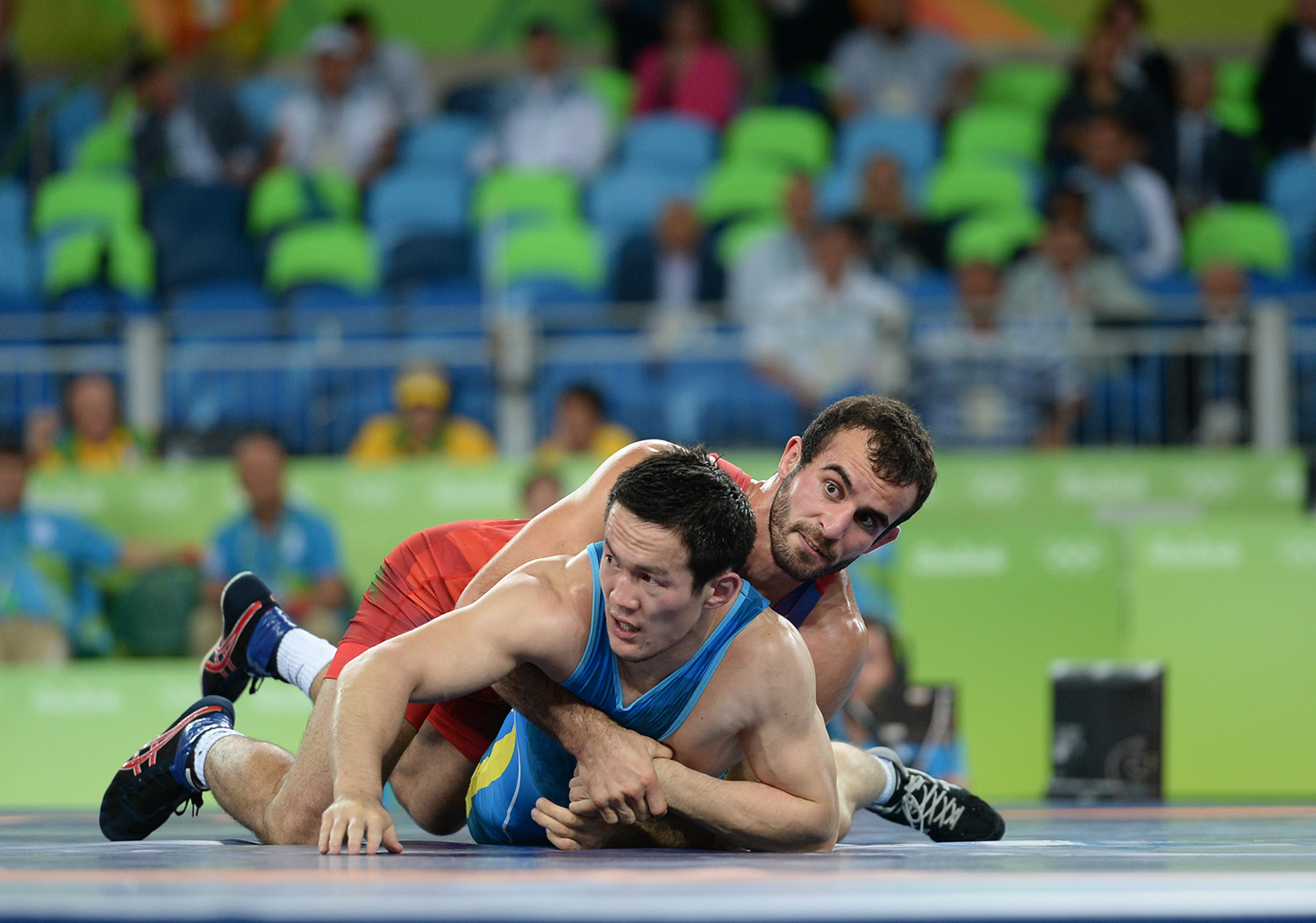
Kartikov

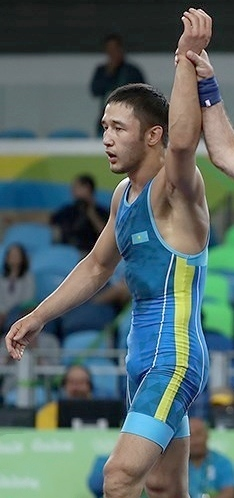
Kebispayev

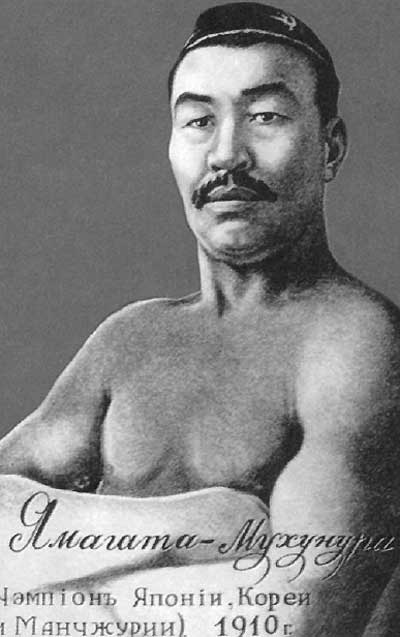
Munaitpasov

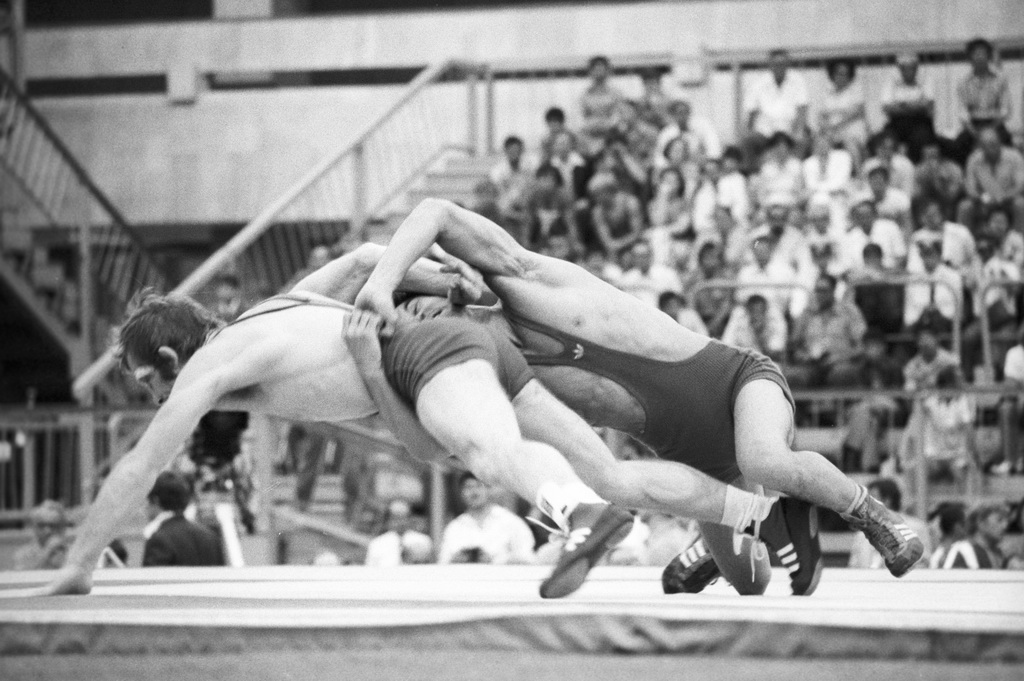
Serikov

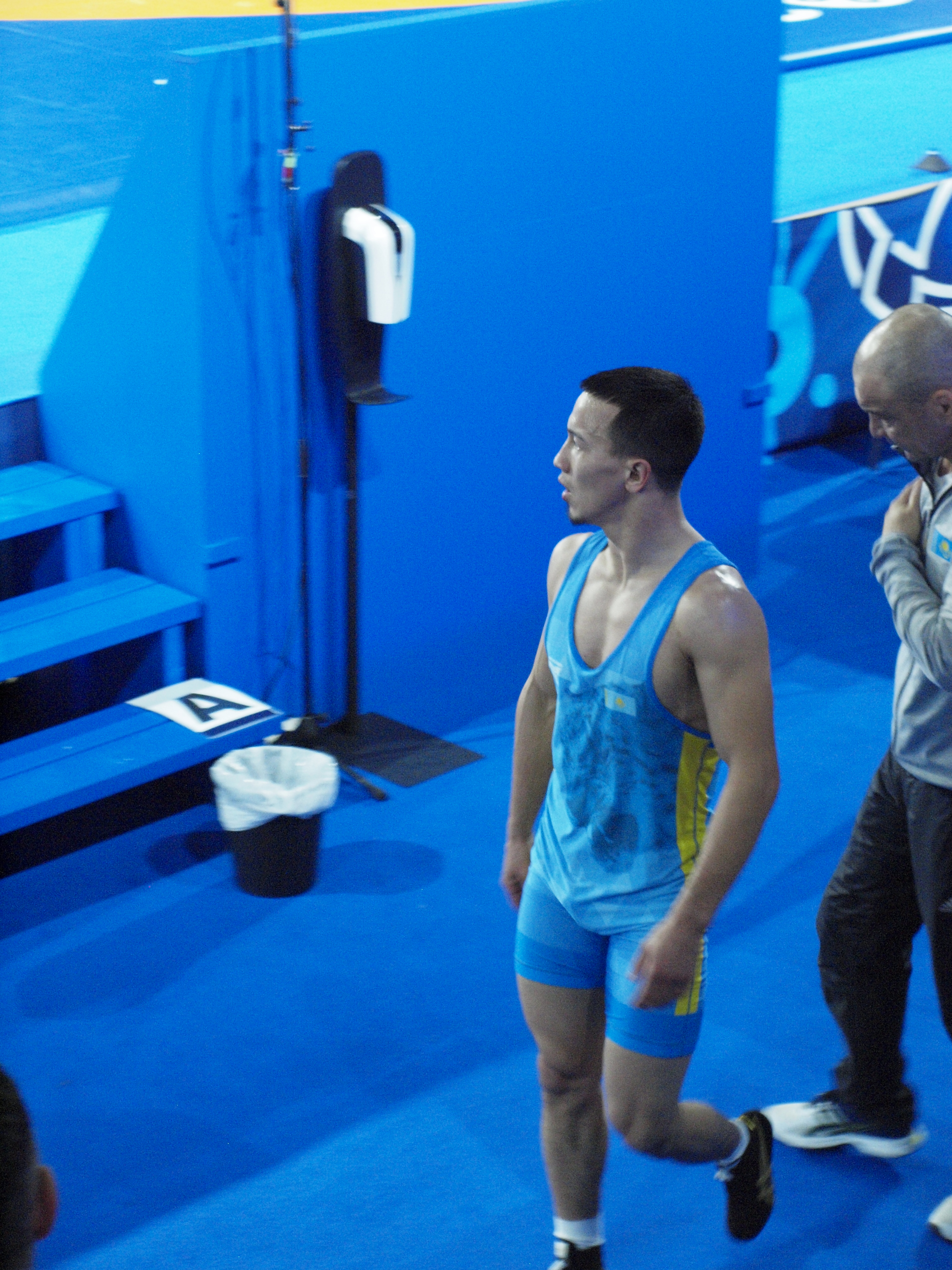
Sultangali

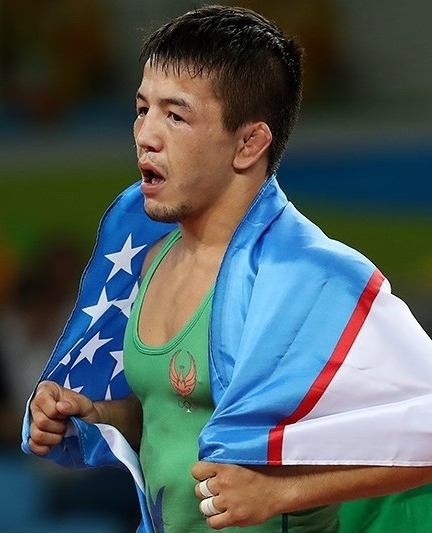
Tasmuradov

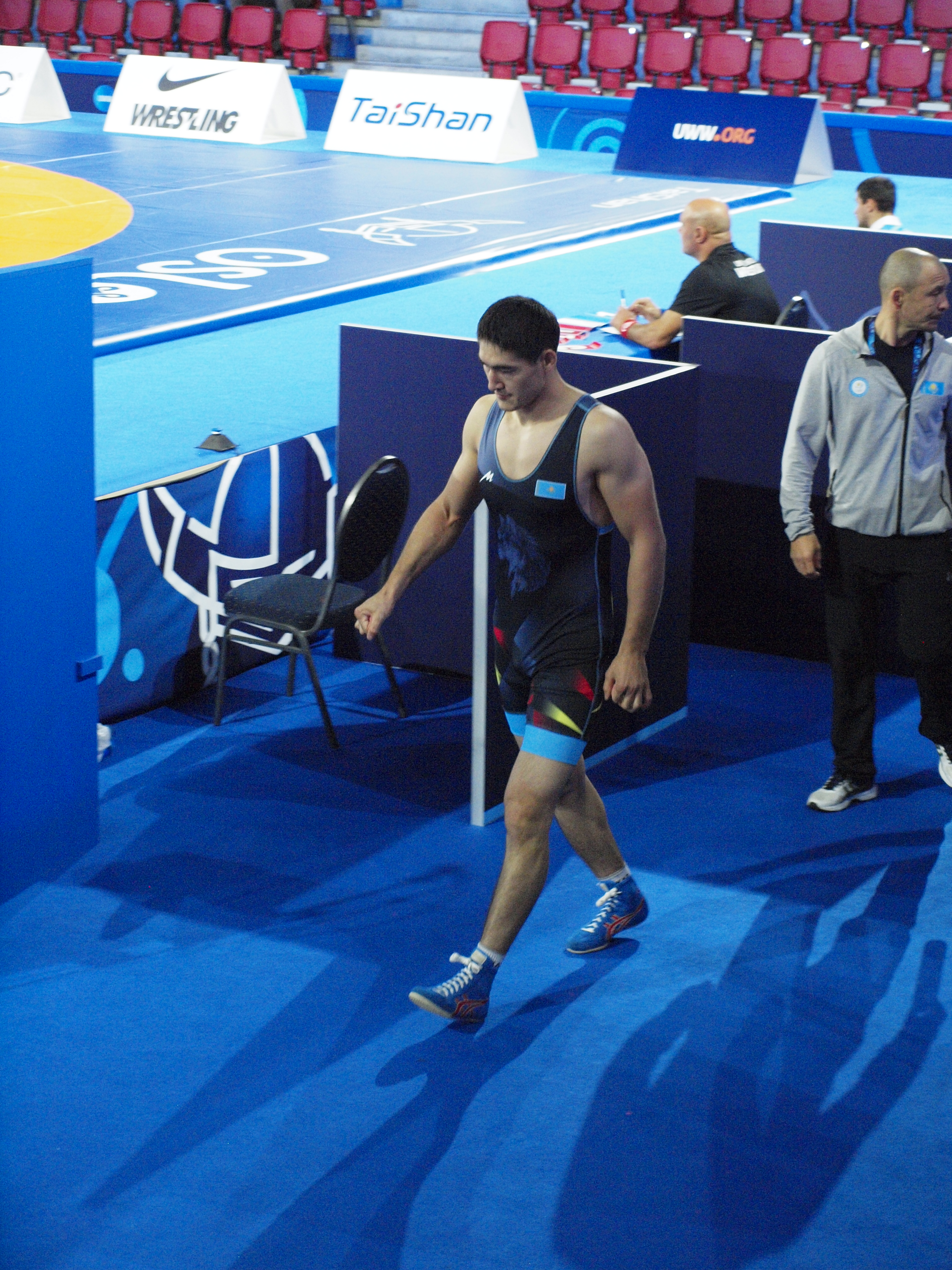
Tursynov

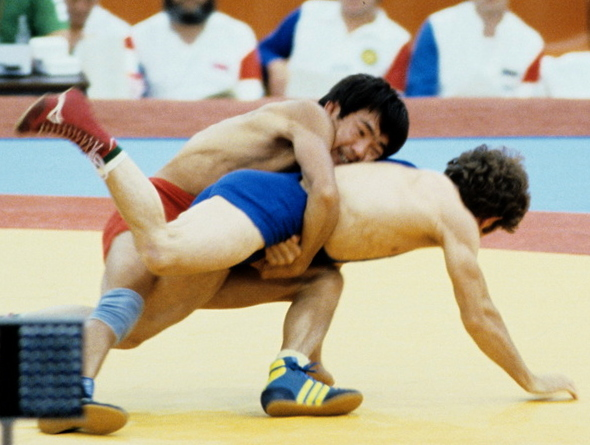
Ushkempirov

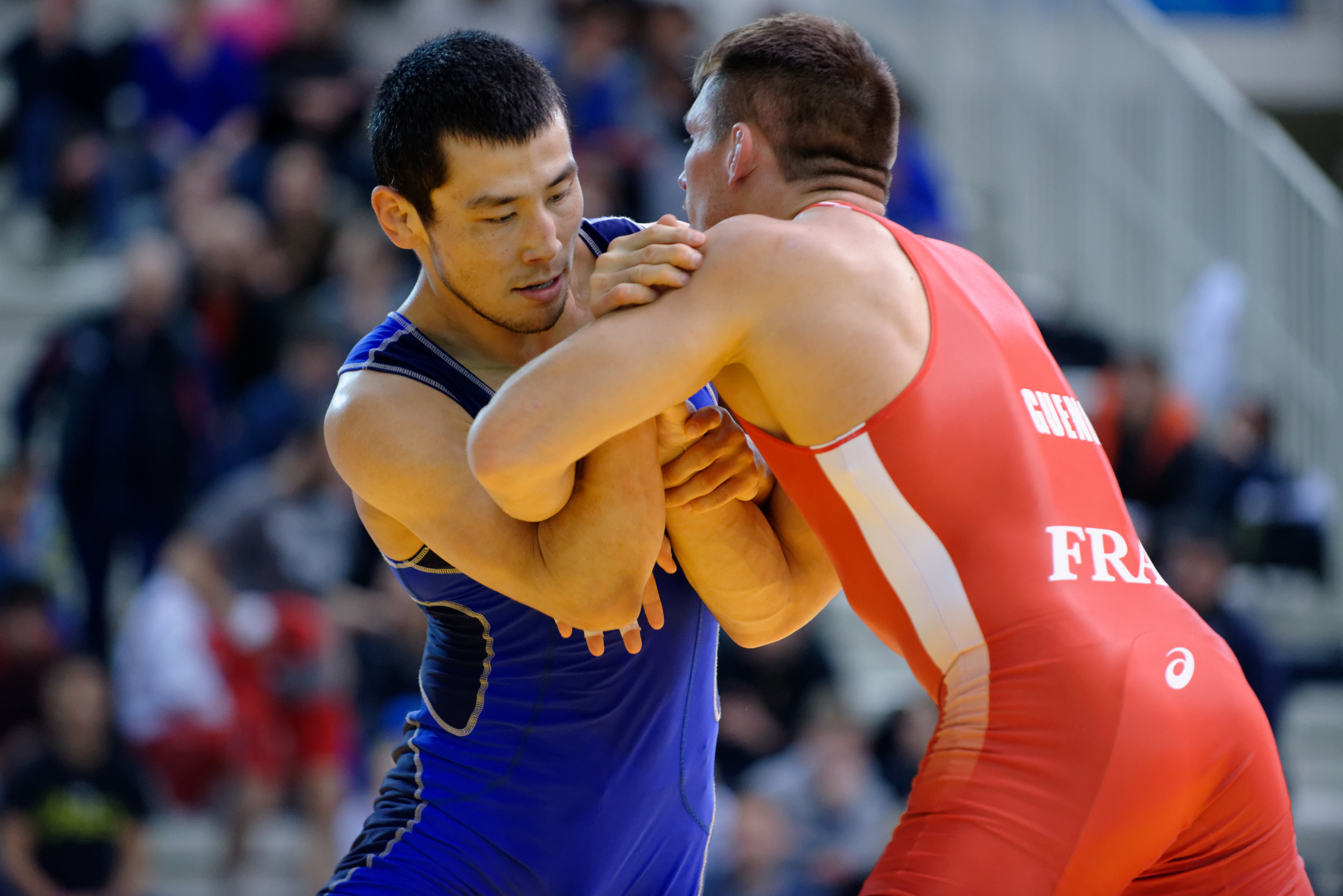
Zhadrayev

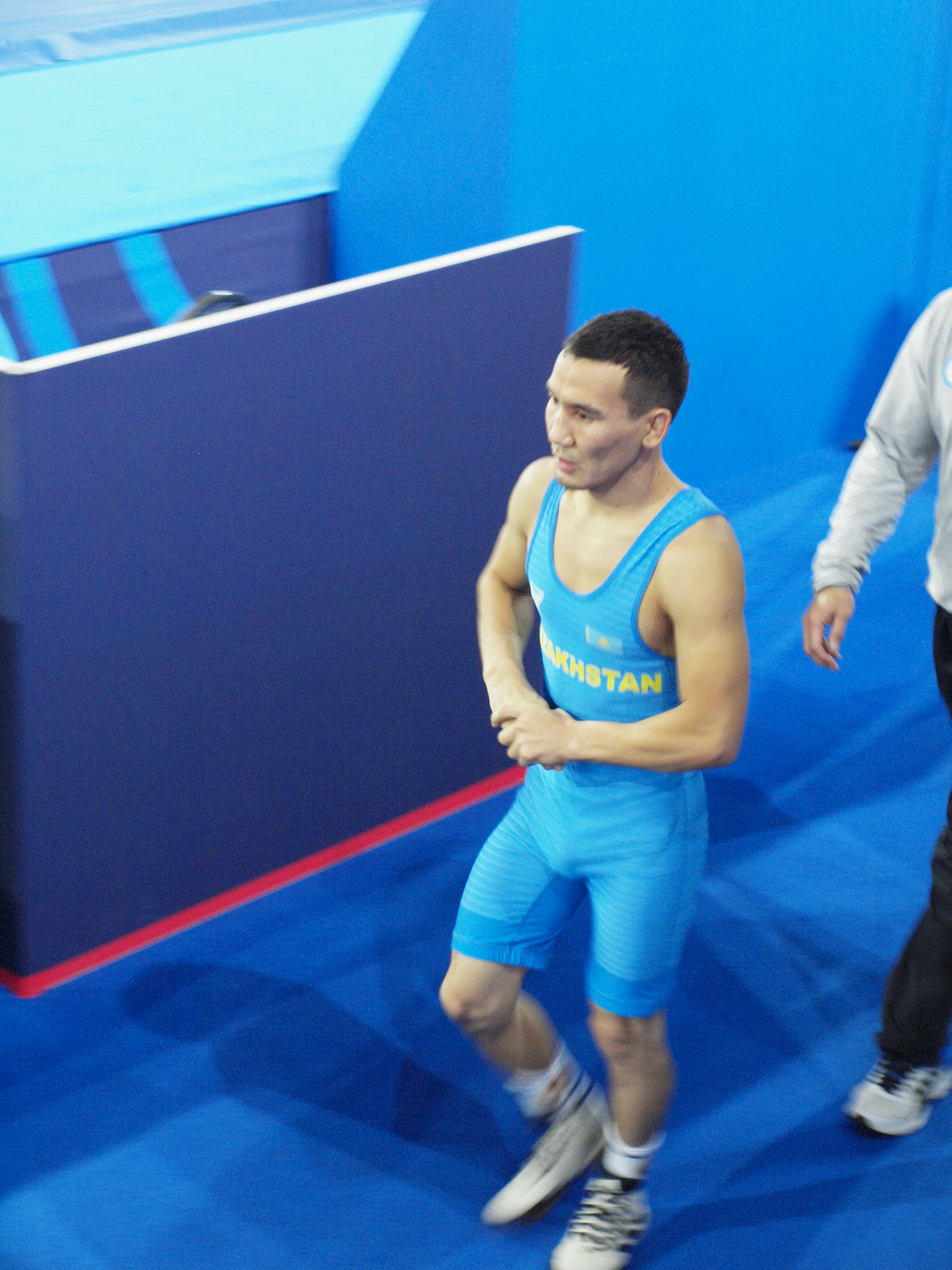
Zhakansha

==== Freestyle ====
- Rizabek Aitmukhan – champion of the 2023 World Championships
- Zhamila Bakbergenova – won three silver medals (2021 World Championships, 2022 World Championships, 2024 World Championships) and bronze medal winner at the 2023 World Championships
- Islam Bayramukov – silver medal winner of the 2000 Summer Olympics
- Zhuldyz Eshimova – silver medal winner of the 2008 World Championships and bronze medal at the 2011 World Championships
- Nurkozha Kaipanov – champion of the 2024 World Championships, silver medalist 2019 World Championships, bronze medalist 2025 World Championships
- Maulen Mamyrov – bronze medal winner of the 1996 Summer Olympics
- Daulet Niyazbekov – silver medal at the 2019 World Championships and bronze medal at the 2011 World Championships
- Daulet Shabanbay – bronze medal winner of the 2012 Summer Olympics
- Baluan Sholak (1864–1919) – poet and wrestler
- Elmira Syzdykova – bronze medal winner of the 2016 Summer Olympics
- Akzhurek Tanatarov – bronze medal winner of the 2012 Summer Olympics
- Daulet Turlykhanov – silver medal winner of the 1988 Summer Olympics, bronze medal winner of the 1992 Summer Olympics
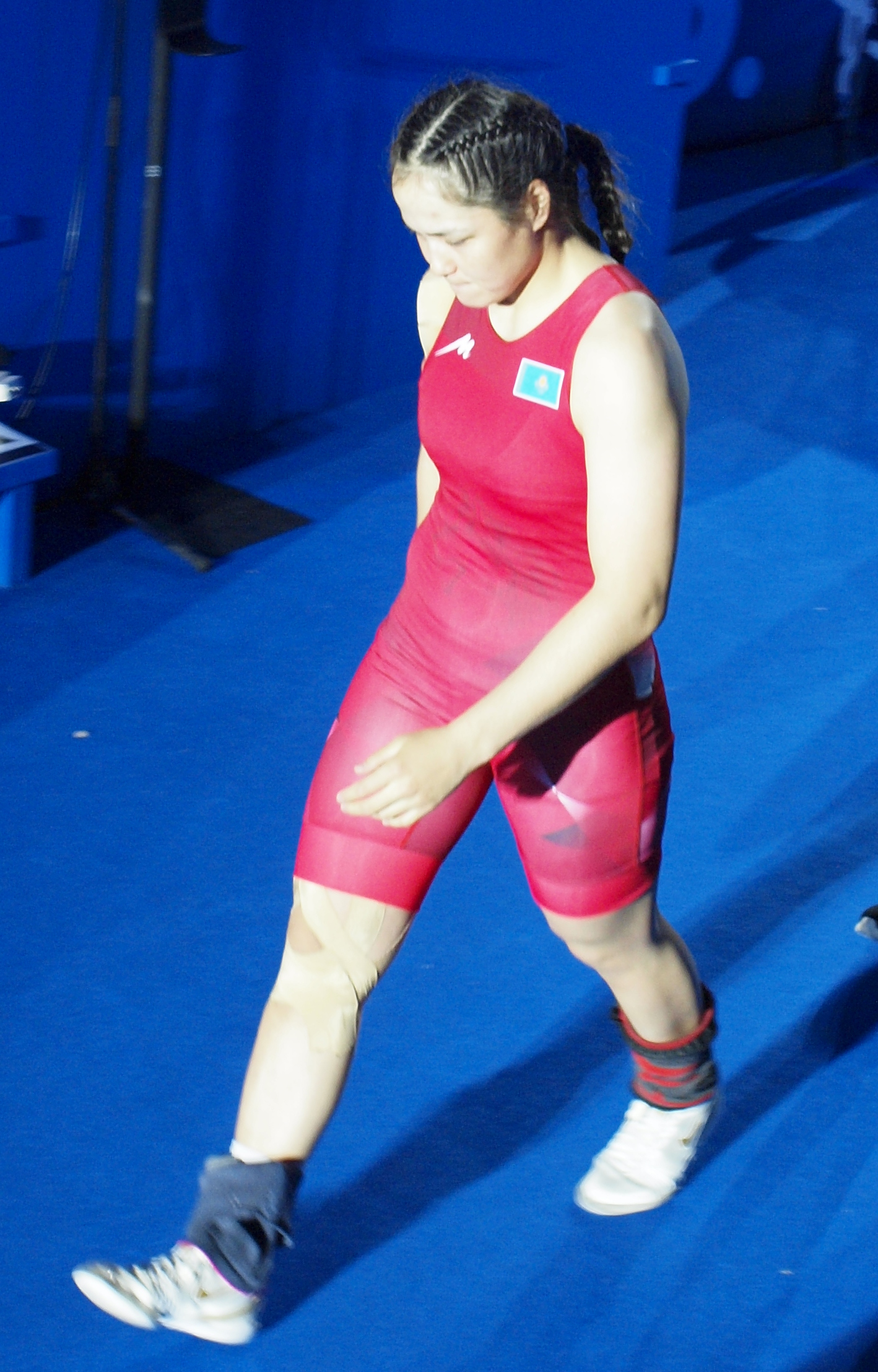
Bakbergenova

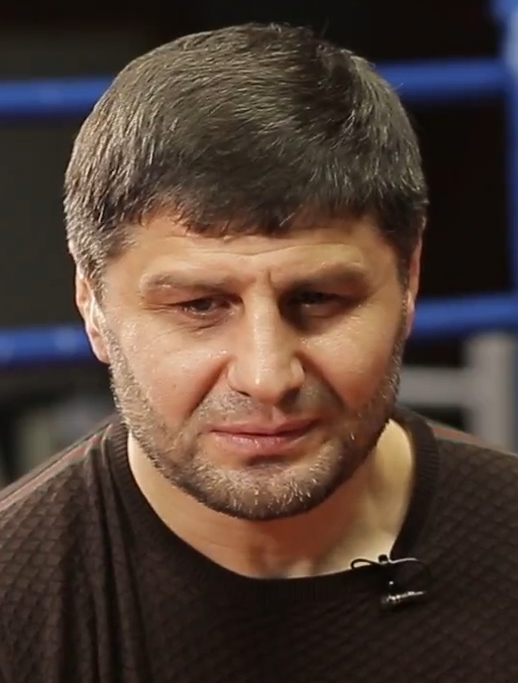
Bayramukov

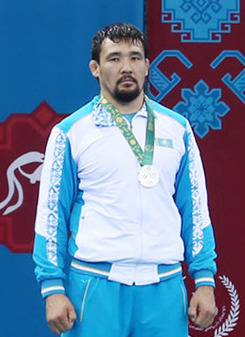
Shabanbay

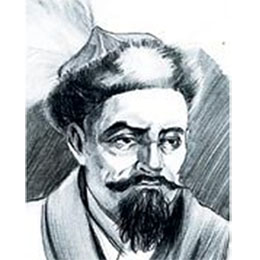
Sholak

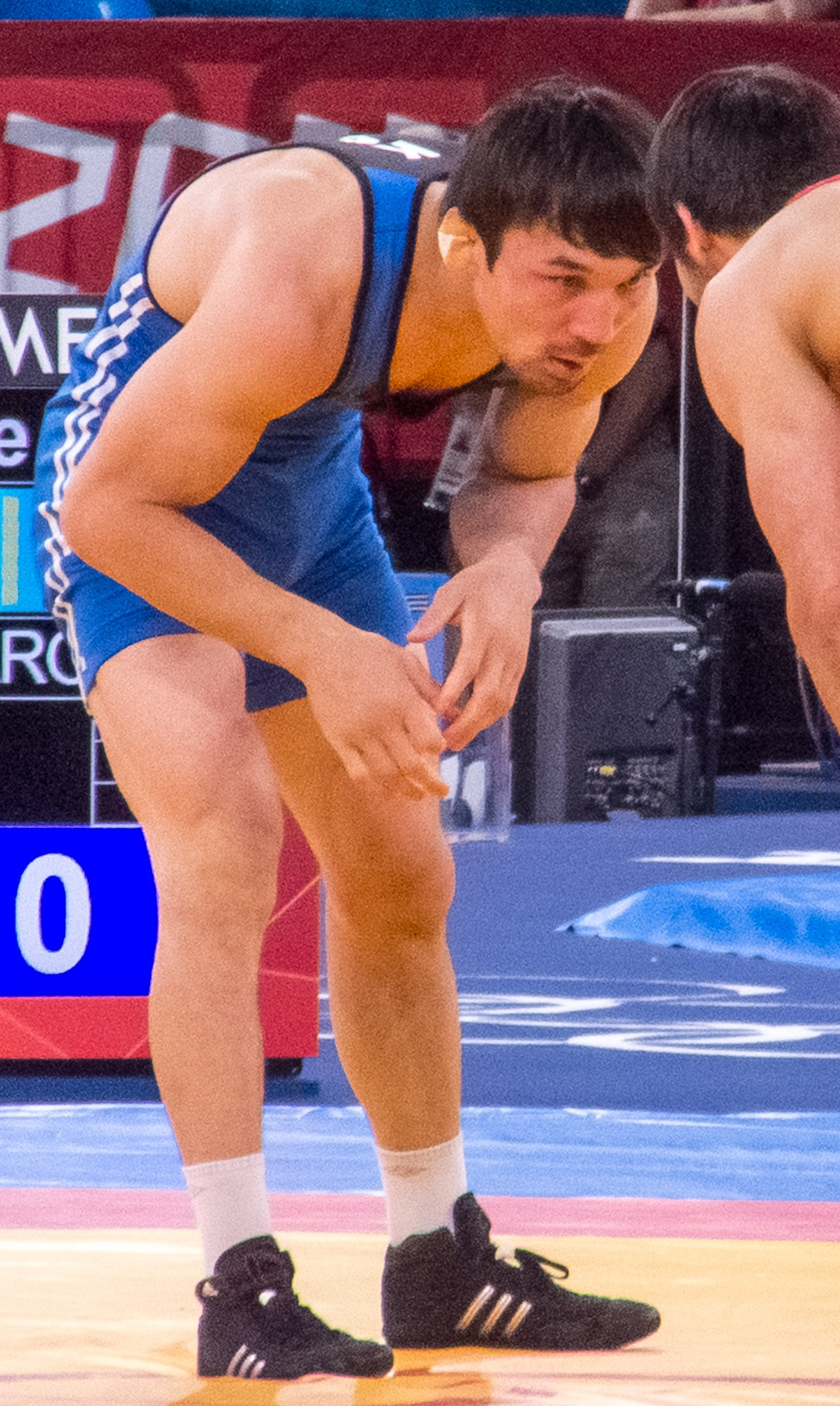
Tanatarov

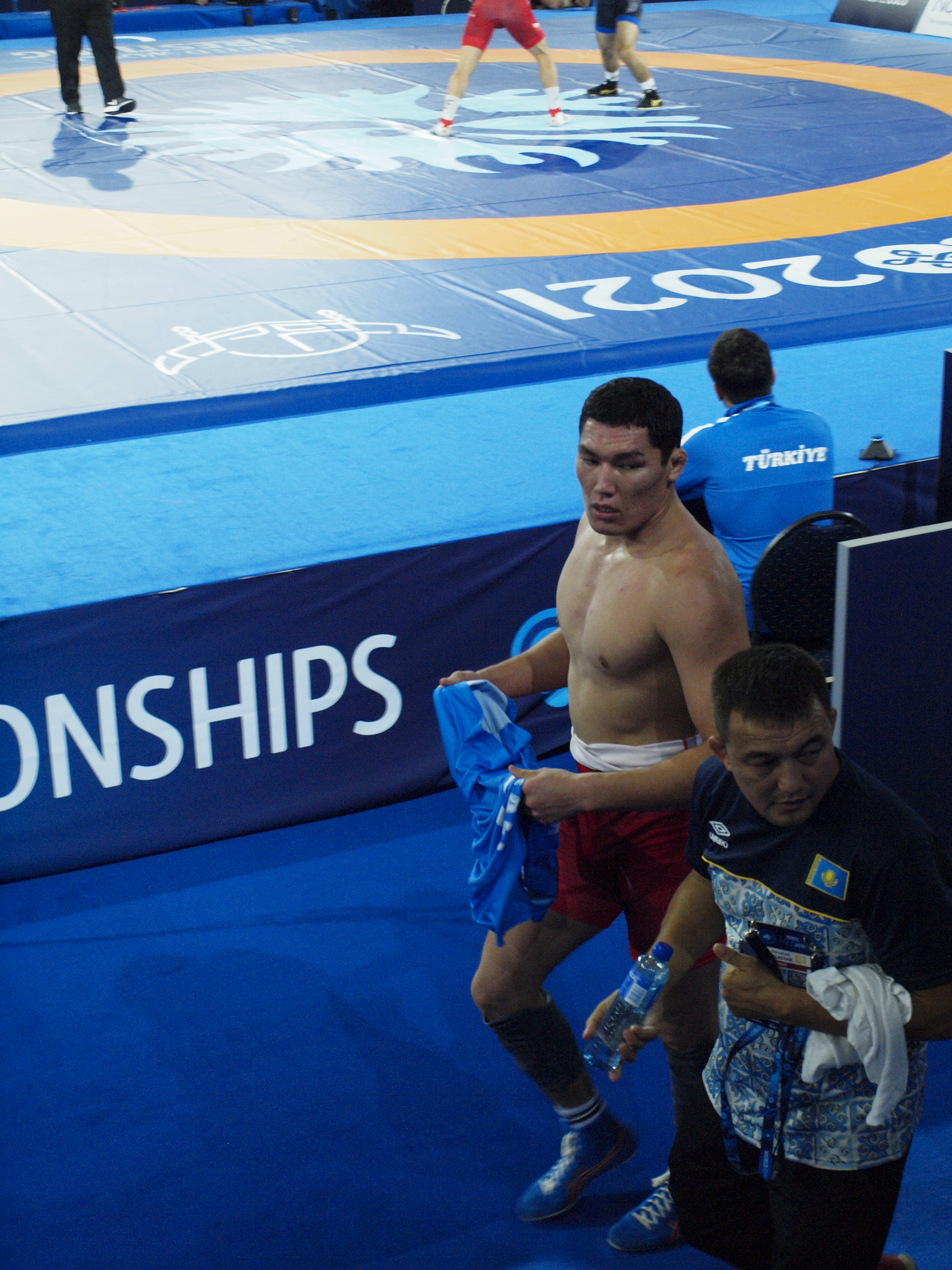
Yergali

==== Sumo ====
- Kinbōzan Haruki (born 1997) – Top division rikishi.
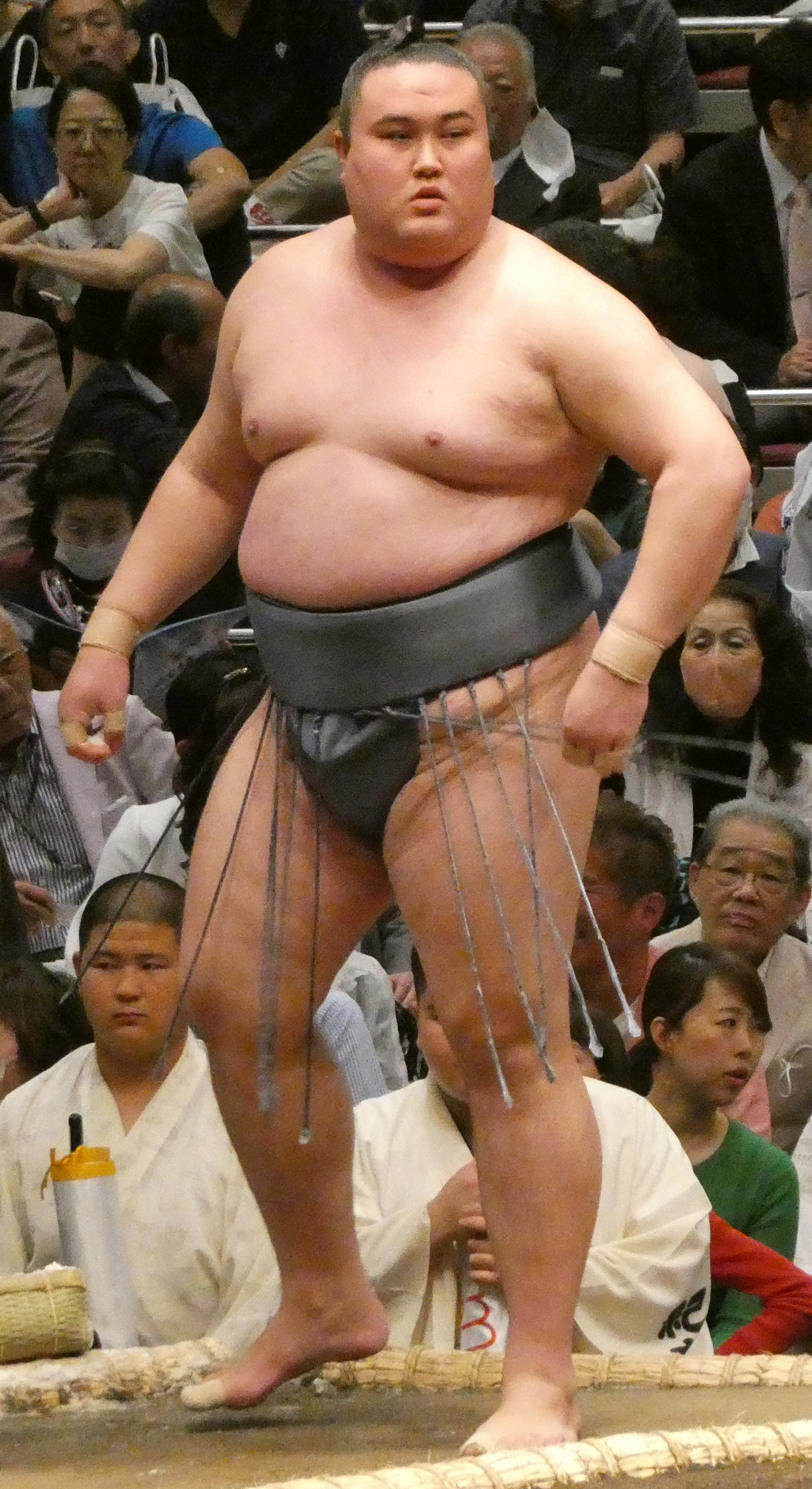
Kinbōzan

=== Judo ===
- Abiba Abuzhakynova (born 1997) – judoka, two bronze medal-winner of the 2022 World Judo Championships, 2024 World Judo Championships
- Gusman Kyrgyzbayev (born 1992) – judoka, bronze medal-winner of the 2024 Summer Olympics, silver medal-winner of the 2021 World Judo Championships
- Aidyn Smagulov (born 1976) – judoka, bronze medal-winner of the 2000 Summer Olympics
- Yeldos Smetov (born 1992) – judoka, champion of the 2024 Summer Olympics, silver medal-winner of the 2016 Summer Olympics, bronze medal-winner of the 2020 Summer Olympics
- Askhat Zhitkeyev (born 1981) – judoka, silver medal-winner of the 2008 Summer Olympics
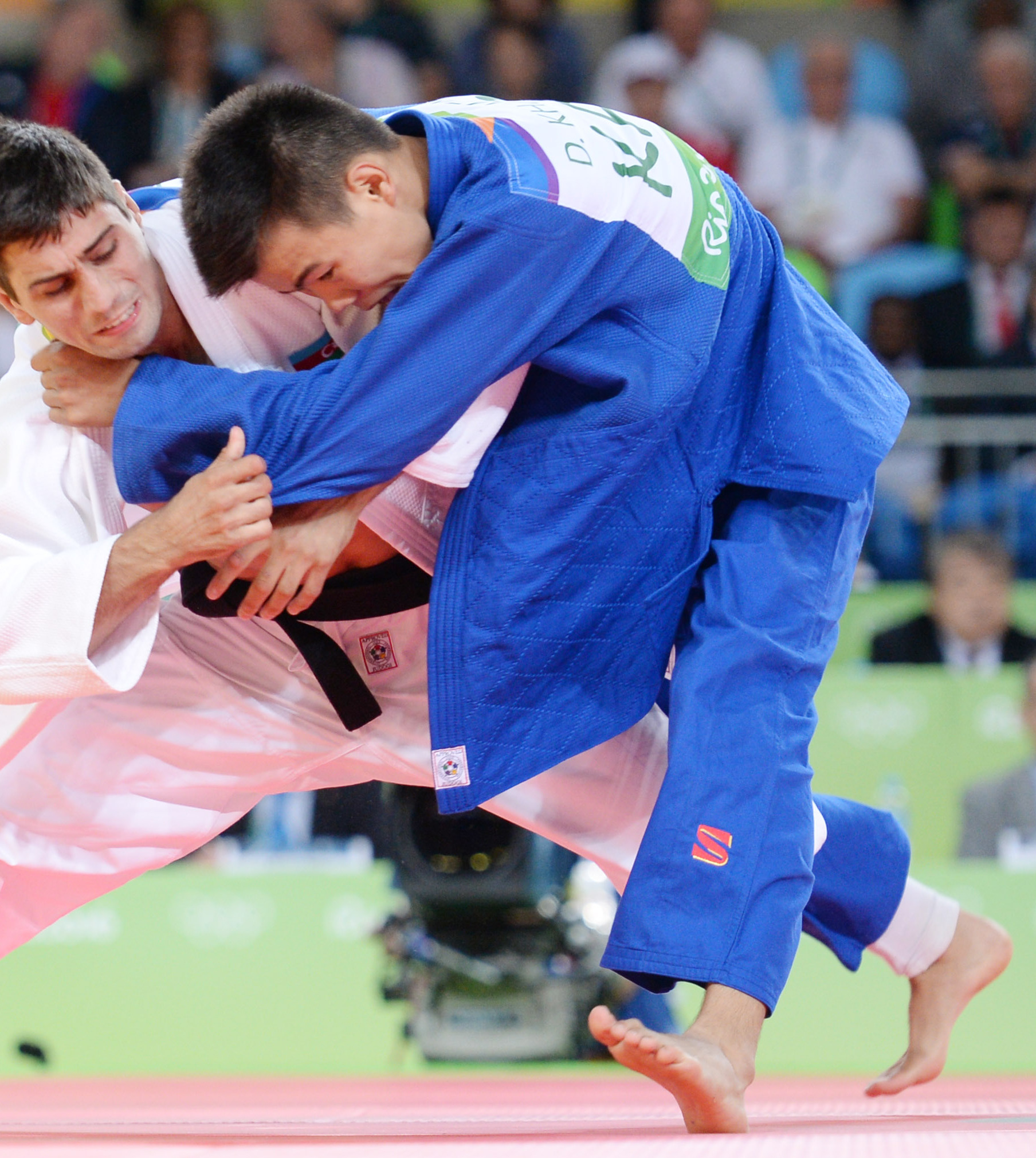
Khamza

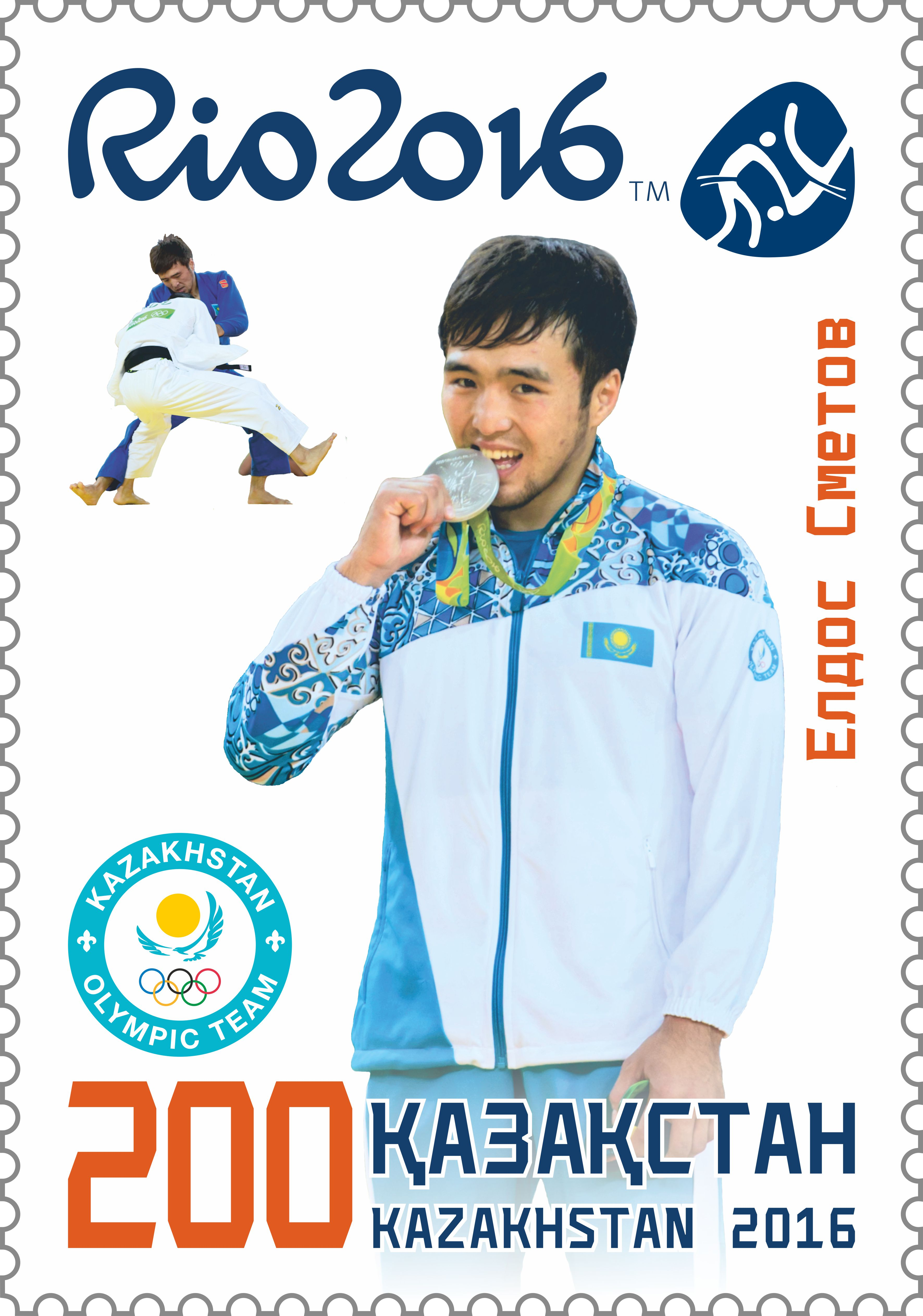
Smetov

=== Mixed Martial Arts ===
- Kairat Akhmetov (born 1987) – mixed martial artist, fighting for ONE Championship
- Asu Almabayev (born 1997) – UFC fighter
- Bekzat Almakhan (born 1994) – UFC fighter
- Damir Ismagulov (born 1991) – UFC fighter
- Shayilan Nuerdanbieke (born 1994) – UFC fighter
- Shavkat Rakhmonov (born 1994) – UFC fighter
- Zhalgas Zhumagulov (born 1988) – UFC fighter
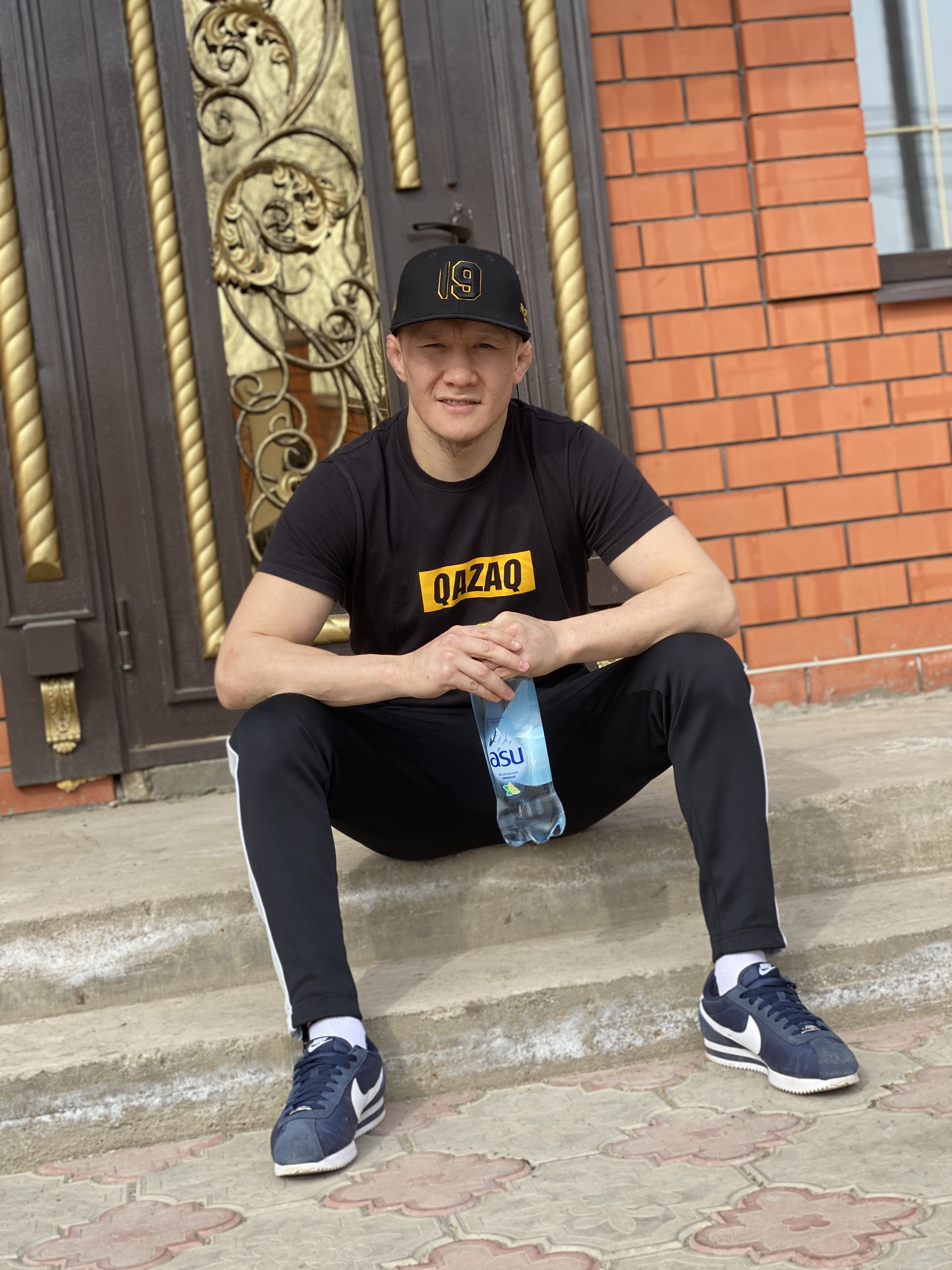
Zhumagulov

=== Chess ===
- Bibisara Assaubayeva (born 2004) – International Master (IM), Woman Grandmaster (WGM),Grandmaster(GM)and Women's World Blitz Champion (since 2021)
- Zhansaya Abdumalik (born 2000) – International Master (IM) and Woman Grandmaster (WGM)
- Gulmira Dauletova (born 1988) – Woman Grandmaster (WGM)
- Madina Davletbayeva (born 1989) – Woman Grandmaster (WGM)
- Rinat Jumabayev (born 1989) – Grandmaster (GM)
- Meruert Kamalidenova (born 2005) – International Master
- Murtas Kazhgaleyev (born 1973) – Grandmaster (GM)
- Guliskhan Nakhbayeva (born 1991) – International Master (IM) and Woman Grandmaster (WGM)
- Dinara Saduakassova (born 1996) – International Master (IM) and Woman Grandmaster (WGM)
- Darmen Sadvakasov (born 1978) – Grandmaster (GM)
- Dana Tuleyeva-Aketayeva (born 1986) – Woman International Master (WIM)
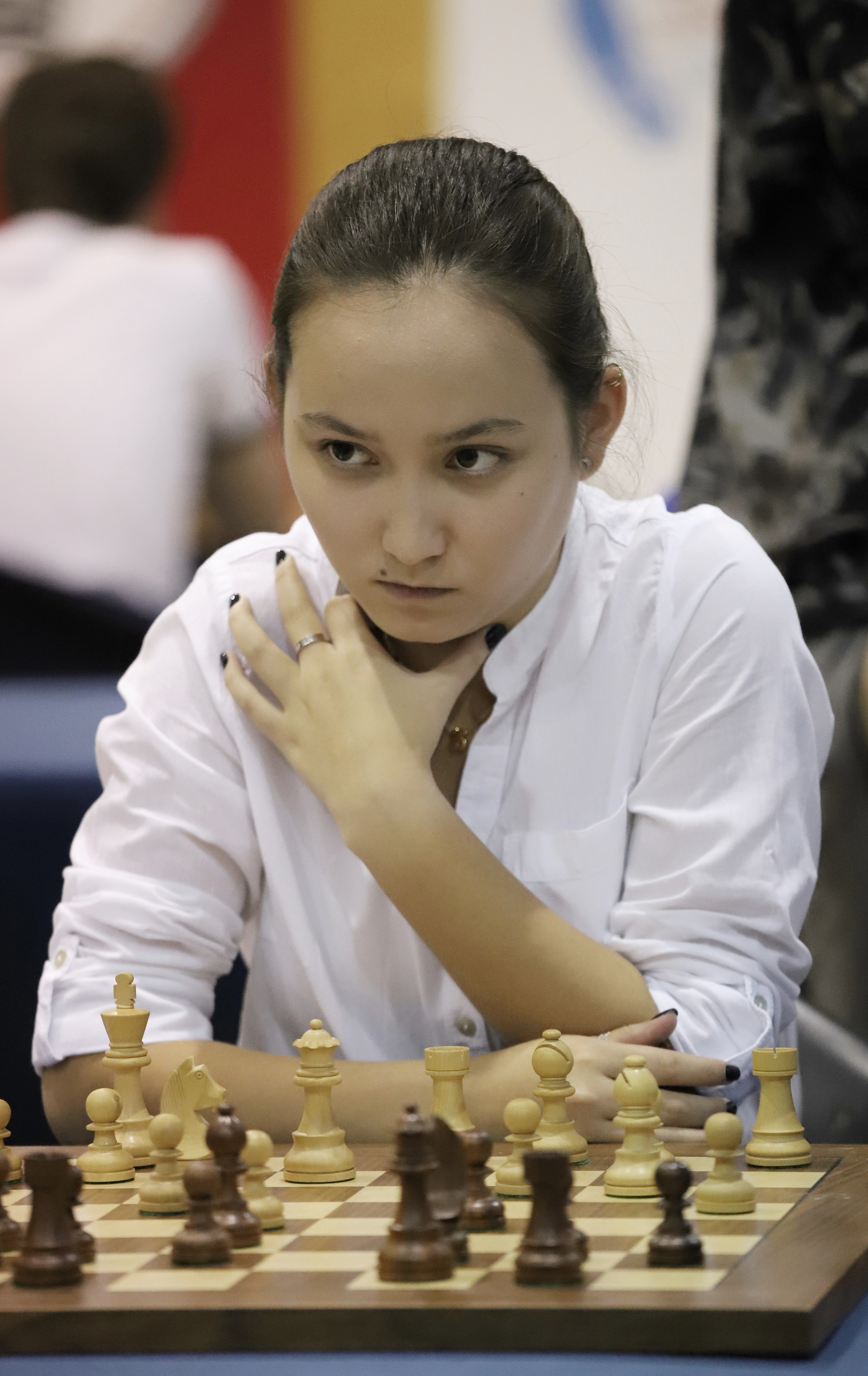
Abdumalik

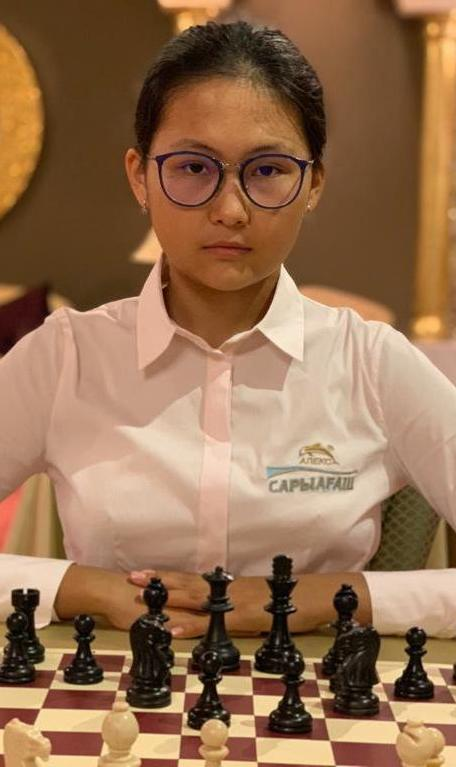
Assaubayeva

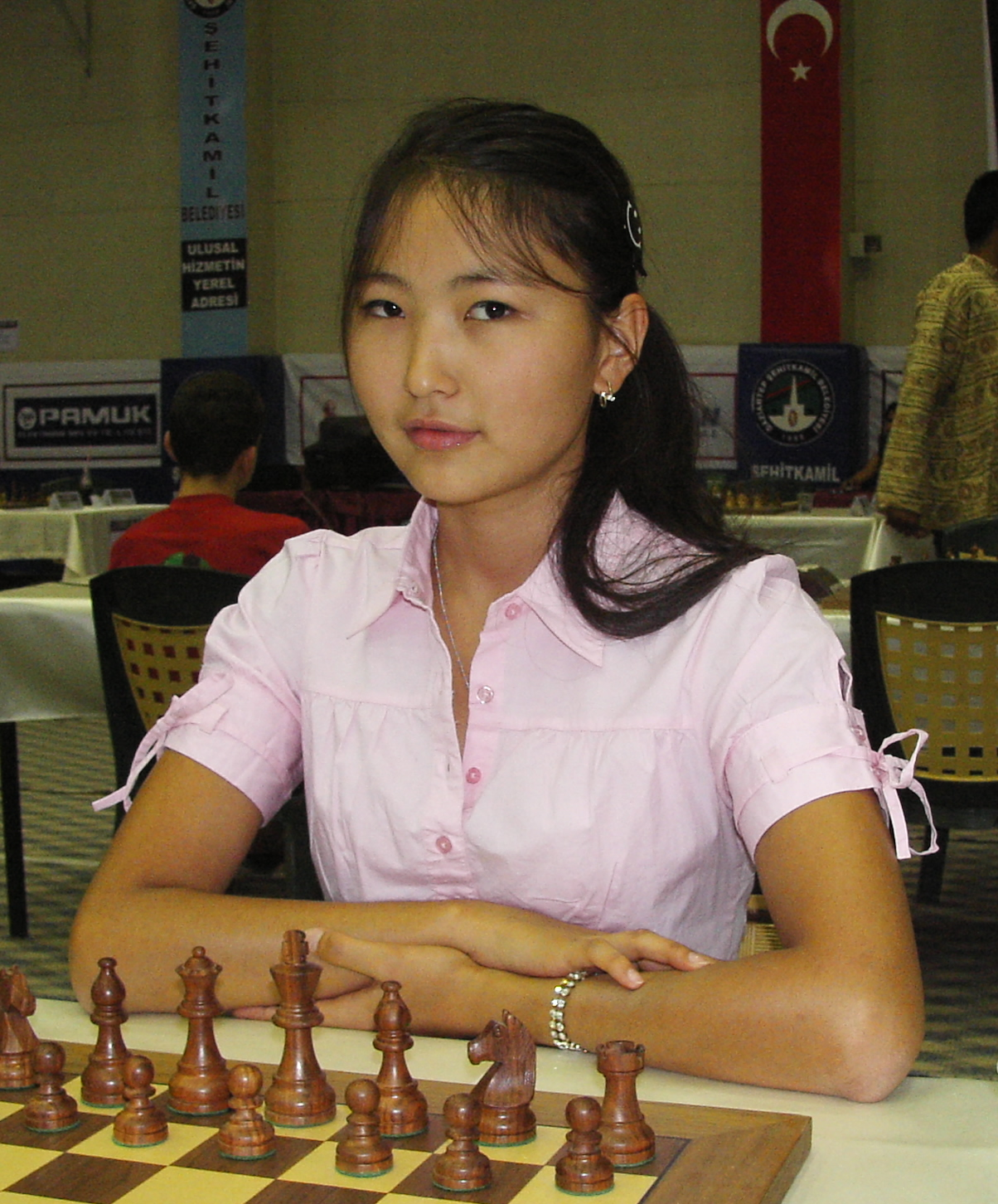
Nakhbayeva

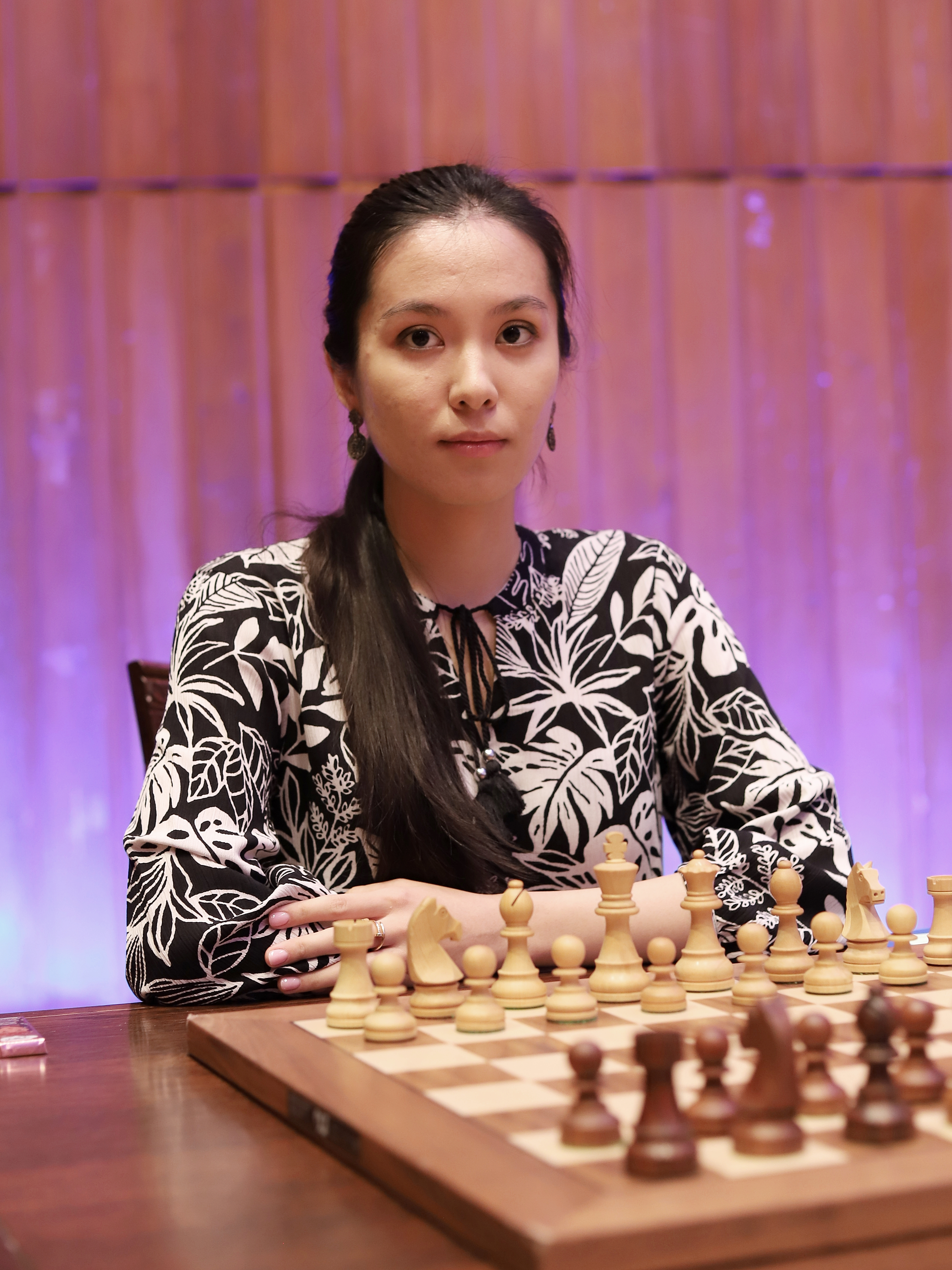
Saduakassova

=== Ice hockey ===
- Nik Antropov (born 1980) – former NHL player
- Anton Khudobin (born 1986) – current NHL goaltender (2004–)
- Vitali Kolesnik (born 1979) – former NHL goaltender
- Evgeni Nabokov (born 1975) – former NHL goaltender (1995–2015)

=== Football ===
- Nuraly Alip (born 1999) – footballer playing for Zenit St. Petersburg
- Seilda Baishakov (born 1950) – FC Kairat and Soviet Union national football team (1971–1981)
- Bakhtiyar Zaynutdinov (born 1998) – Kazakh professional footballer, FC Dynamo Moscow
- Dastan Satpayev (born 2008) – Kazakh professional footballer, FC Chelsea/FC Kairat
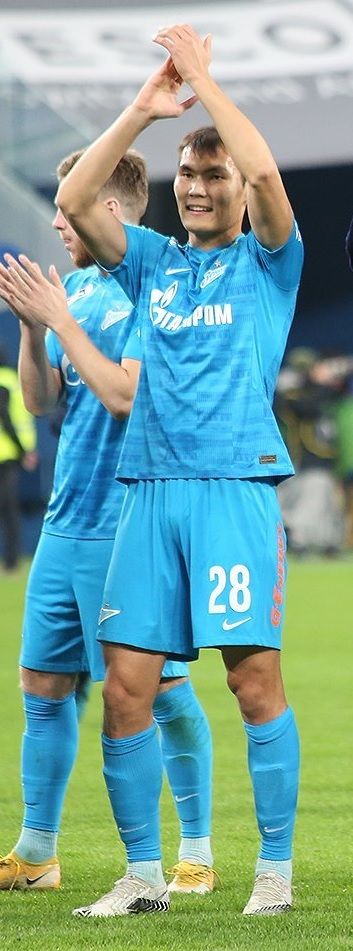
Alip

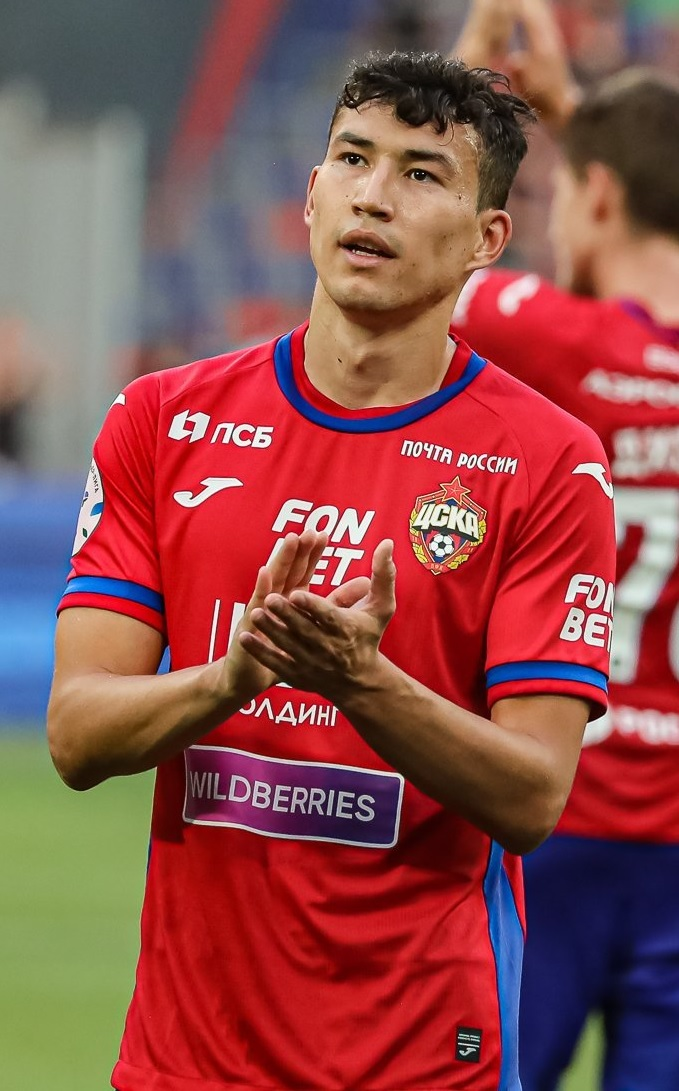
Zaynutdinov

=== Other ===
- Dzinara Alimbekava (born 1996) – Kazakh-born Belarusian biathlete, Olympic Champion of the 2014 Winter Olympics
- Darkhan Assadilov – karateka, bronze medal winner of the 2020 Summer Olympics
- Assan Bazayev (born 1981) – cyclist
- Arman Chilmanov (born 1984) – taekwondo athlete, bronze prize-winner of the 2008 Summer Olympics
- Zarina Diyas (born 1993) – tennis player
- Dias Keneshev (born 1985) – biathlete
- Gusman Kosanov (1935–1990) – sprinter, silver medal winner of the 1960 Summer Olympics
- Nurlan Mendygaliyev (1961) – water polo player, bronze medal winner of the 1988 Summer Olympics
- Kaisar Nurmaganbetov (born 1977) – flatwater canoer
- Assan Takhtakhunov (born 1986) – ski jumper
- Elizabet Tursynbaeva (born 2000) – figure skater and 2019 World Silver Medalist
- Yernar Yerimbetov (born 1980) – gymnast
- Aliya Yussupova (born 1984) – athlete
- Radik Zhaparov (born 1984) – ski jumper
- Alzhan Zharmukhamedov (born 1944) – basketball player, gold medalist at the 1972 Summer Olympics, bronze medal winner of the 1976 Summer Olympics
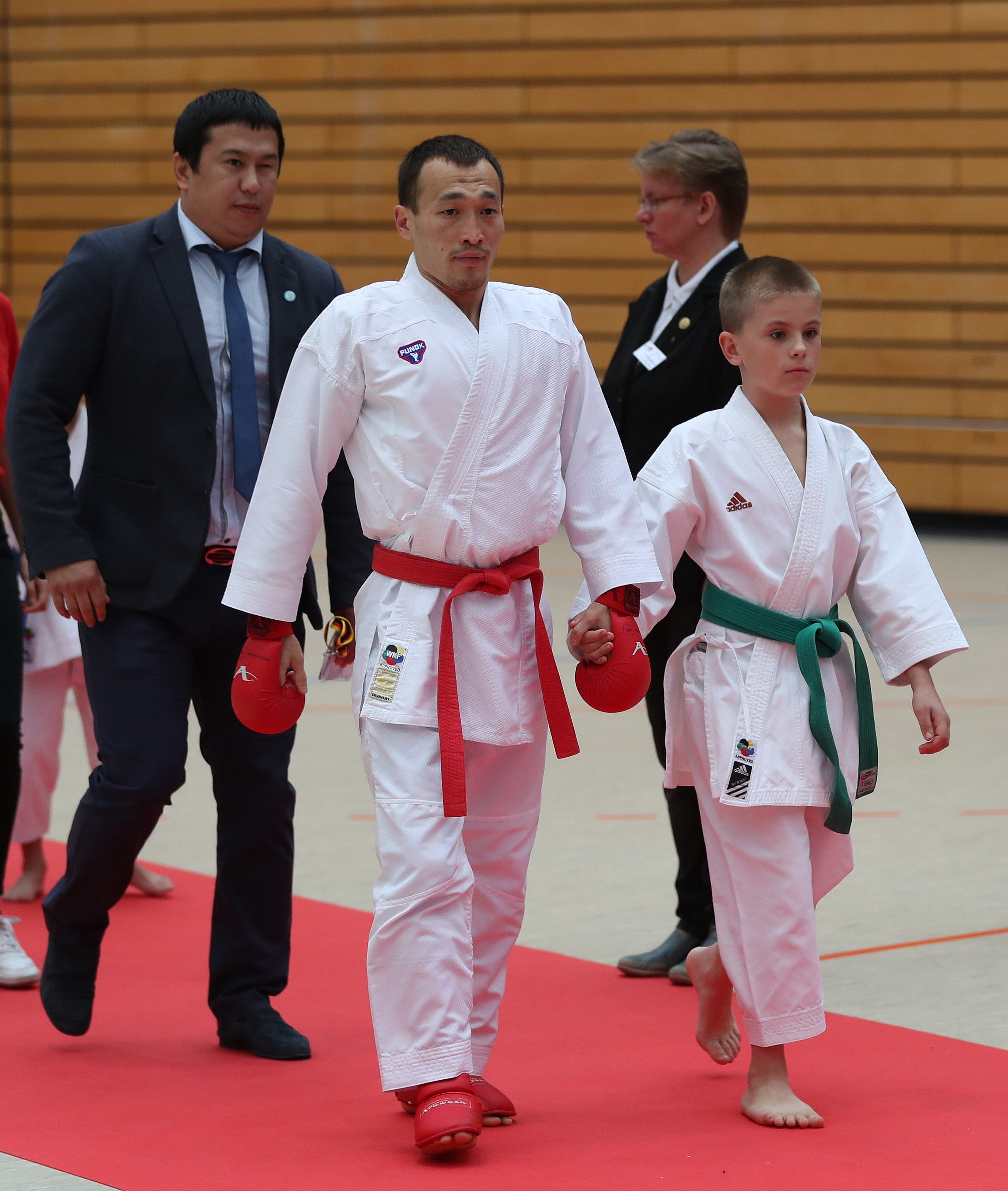
Assadilov

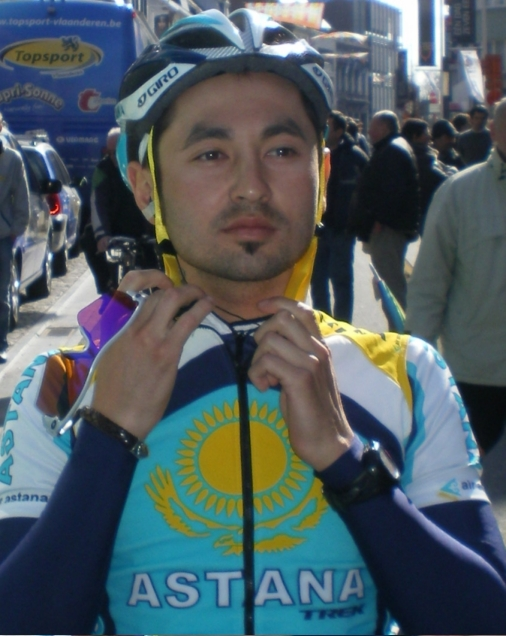
Bazayev

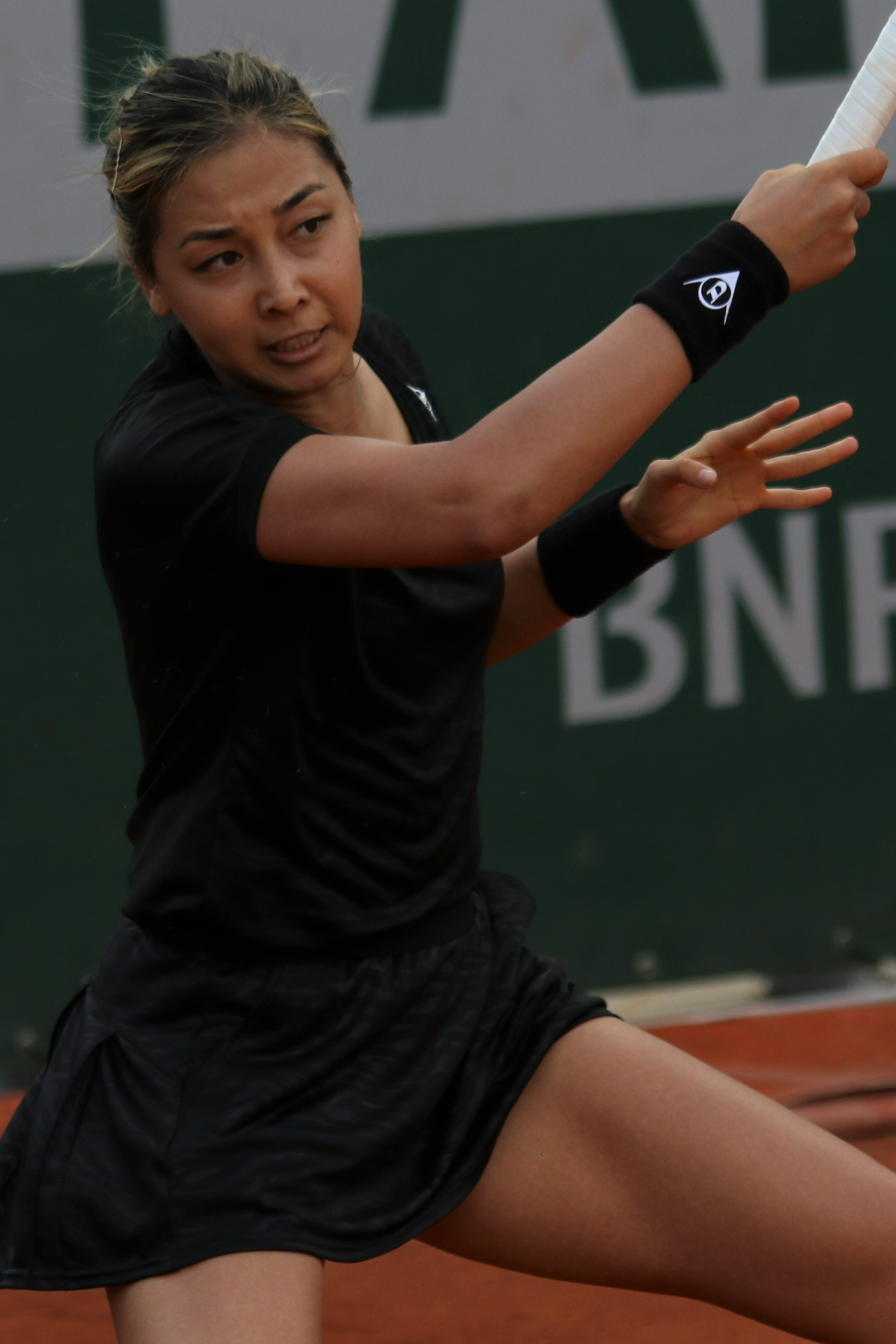
Diyas

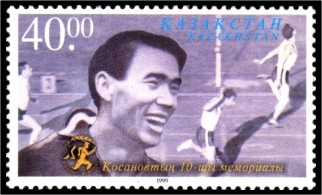
Kosanov

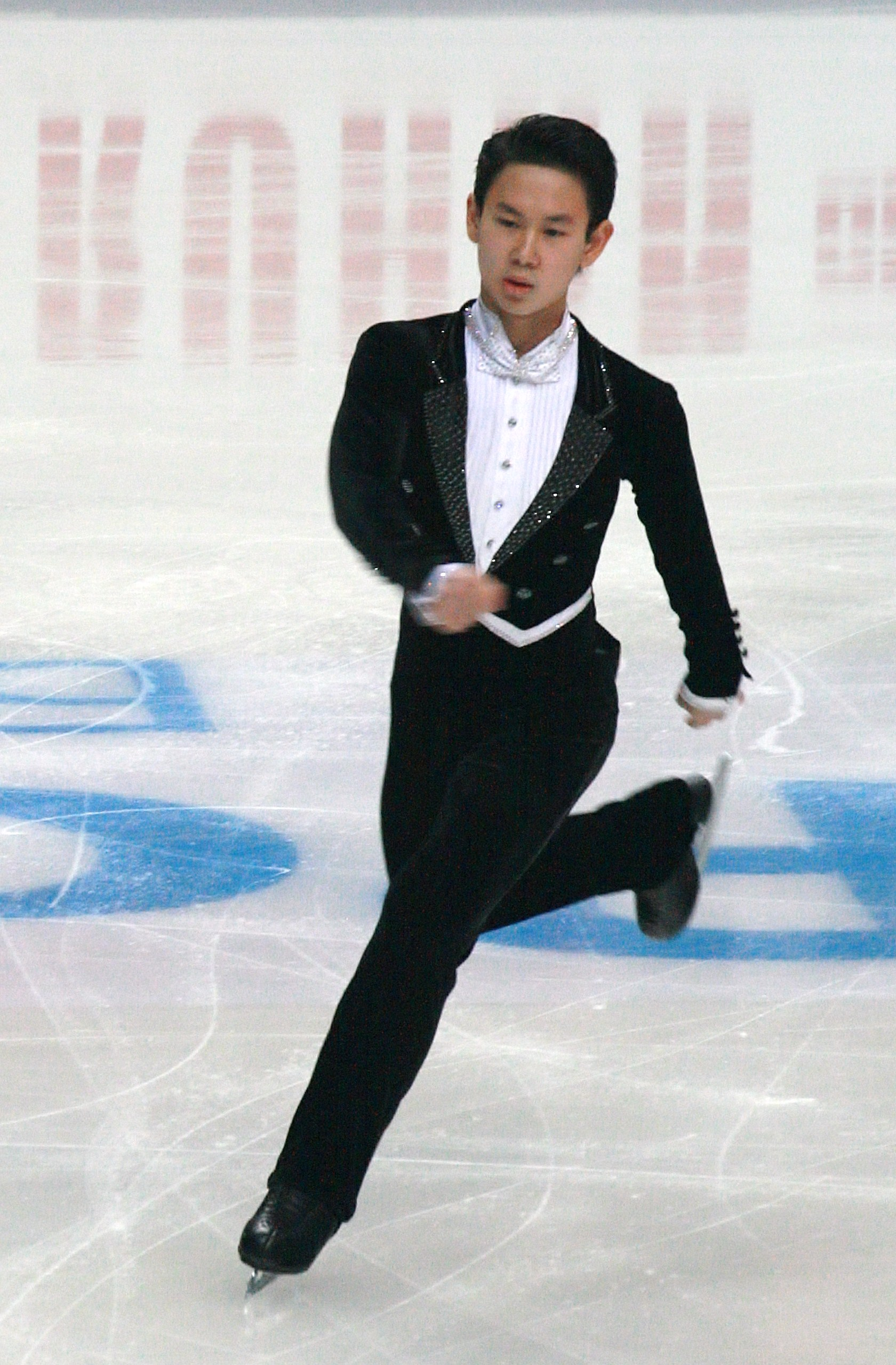
Ten

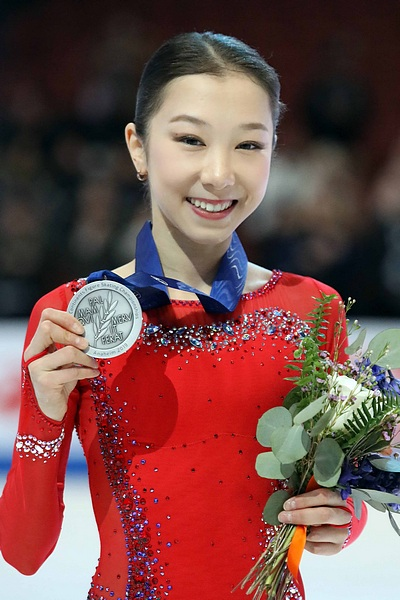
Tursynbaeva

=== Weightlifting ===
- Zulfiya Chinshanlo (born 1993) – champion of the 2012 Summer Olympics, bronze medal winner of the 2020 Summer Olympics
- Farkhad Kharki (born 1991) – bronze medal winner of the 2016 Summer Olympics
- Maiya Maneza (born 1985) – won two golds (2009, 2010) at the World Weightlifting Championships
- Anna Nurmukhambetova (born 1993) – bronze medal winner of the 2012 Summer Olympics
- Zhazira Zhapparkul (born 1993) – silver medal winner of the 2016 Summer Olympics
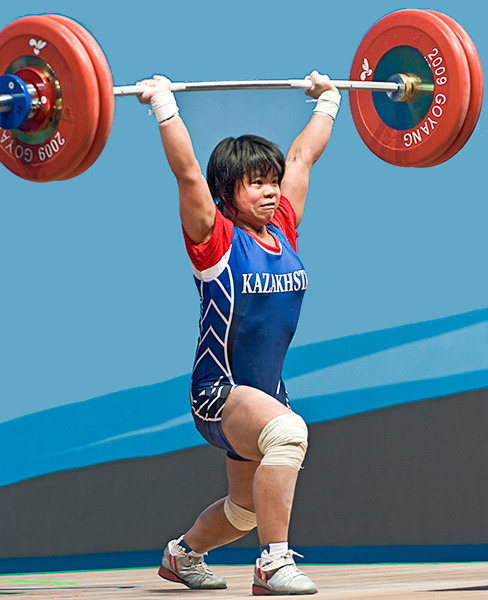
Chinshanlo

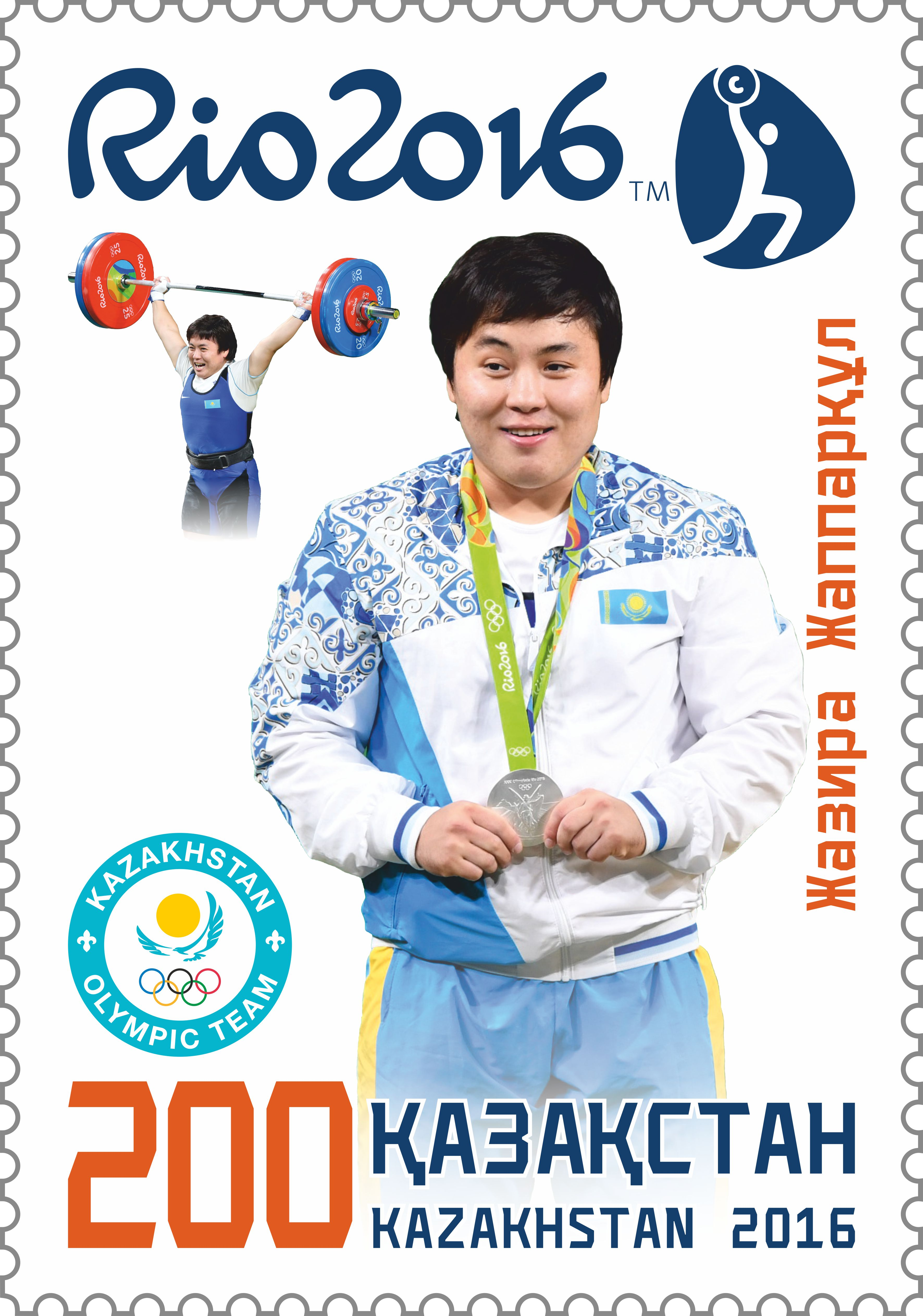
Zhapparkul

== Other Kazakhs ==
- Kanseyt Abdezuly, philologist, university dean, and professor
- Ashirbek Torebayuly Sygai, theater critic, translator, educator, and professor

== See also ==
- Kazakh Americans
- List of people by nationality
