= Georgy Sergeyev =

Russian weapons designer

- Born: Georgy Ivanovich Sergeyev; 30 August 1911; Taganrog, Don Host Oblast, Russian Empire
- Died: 15 March 1988 (aged 76); Volgograd, RSFSR, Soviet Union
- Occupations: Designer of artillery and rocket systems
- Years active: 1932–1984

Georgy Ivanovich Sergeyev (Russian: Георгий Иванович Сергеев; 30 August 1911 – 15 March 1988) was a Soviet designer of artillery and rocket systems. Hero of Socialist Labour (1975).

== Biography ==
Sergeyev was born in Taganrog.

In 1932 he graduated from the Taganrog Aviation College (Russian: Таганрогский авиационный техникум).

In 1932-1937 worked at Bolshevik Plant no. 232. In 1938-1942 worked at Stalingrad's military factory Barrikady Industrial Association. Under direction of the chief designer Ilya Ivanovich Ivanov he participated in construction of:

- 280 mm mortar M1939 (Br-5)
- 210 mm gun M1939 (Br-17)
- 305 mm howitzer M1939 (Br-18)
- 450 mm howitzer (Br-23)
- 76 mm divisional gun M1939 (USV)

After evacuation of the factory from Stalingrad to Yurga, Sergeyev worked at the Yurga Machine-Building Plant.

In 1945-1950 worked at Leningrad's Bolshevik Plant no. 232. In 1950-1958 worked at the Barrikady Industrial Association in Stalingrad, where he was promoted to the position of the chief of the Special Design Bureau (SKB-221 in 1950). In 1959 Georgy Sergeyev was promoted to the post of the Chief Designer of OKB-221. In 1959-1963 Sergeyev was involved into design works of the first Soviet missile system mounted on army trucks FROG-7.

In the 1970s Georgy Sergeyev was Chief Designer of the missile systems RT-21 Temp 2S, OTR-21 Tochka, OTR-23 Oka and 203 mm 2A44 gun for the self-propelled gun 2S7 Pion. In 1975 for his contribution into design of the 2S7 Pion, Sergeyev was awarded the title of Hero of Socialist Labour.

Georgy Sergeyev retired on August 9, 1984, and died on March 15, 1988, in Volgograd. Within the area of Nizhny Traktorny, a microdistrict of Volgograd, Taimyrskaya Street was renamed to Sergeev Street to commemorate him on 30 August 2011.

== Awards and honors ==
- Medal "For the Defence of Stalingrad" (1942)
- Order of the Red Star (1944)
- Stalin Prize, 1st class (1946)
- Lenin Prize (1966)
- Hero of Socialist Labour (1975)
- Order of October Revolution (1981)
- Medal "For Valiant Labour in the Great Patriotic War 1941–1945"
- Two Orders of Lenin
- Two Orders of the Red Banner of Labour
