= S51 =

S51 may refer to:

== Aircraft ==
- Blériot-SPAD S.51, a French biplane fighter
- SIAI S.51, an Italian racing flying boat
- Sikorsky S-51, an American helicopter

== Other uses ==
- S51 (New York City bus) serving Staten Island
- S51 (RER Fribourg), a rail line in Switzerland
- County Route S51 (Bergen County, New Jersey)
- Nikon Coolpix S51, a digital camera
- S51: Use only in well-ventilated areas, a safety phrase
- S-51 Self-Propelled Gun, a Soviet experimental howitzer
- Shorland S51, a British armoured car
- Tswa language
- USS S-51 (SS-162), a submarine of the United States Navy
- Toyota S51, a Toyota S transmission
