= Galiy Adilbekov =

Soviet career officer-tanker

- Галий Адильбеков
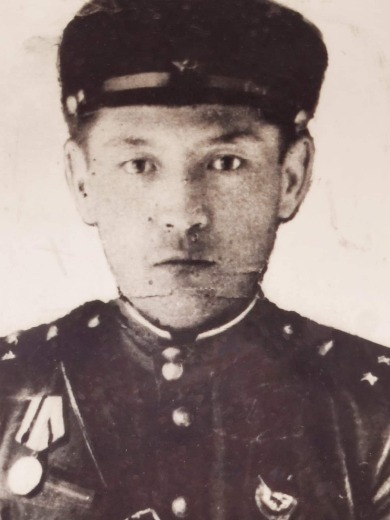
- Born: 1 January 1908; Semipalatinsk Oblast, Russian Empire
- Died: 21 October 1943 (aged 35); Bukrin bridgehead, Kiev Oblast, Ukrainian SSR, Soviet Union
- Burial place: War mass grave village of Lukovytsia, Kyiv Oblast, Ukraine
- Education: Malinovsky Military Armored Forces Academy, Leningrad Higher Officer Armored School, United Central Asian Military School (OSAVSH) in Tashkent
- Children: 3 (1 adopted)
- Military career
- Allegiance: Soviet Union
- Branch: Army
- Service years: 1925–1943
- Rank: Guards unit lieutenant colonel
- Units: 51st Panzer Division, 110th Panzer Division, 141st tank brigade, 121st tank brigade
- Commands: 47th Separate Tank Brigade, 47th Separate Guards Tank Regiment
- Conflicts: World War II; Eastern Front; Battle of Vitebsk; Battle of Smolensk; Roslavl–Novozybkov offensive; Battle of Bryansk; Battle of Moscow; Battle of Stalingrad; Battle of the Dnieper; Sumy-Priluki offensive operation
- Awards: Medal "For the Defence of Stalingrad"; Order of the Red Banner; Order of the Red Banner – posthumously

Galiy Adilbekovich Adilbekov (Russian: Галий Адильбекович Адильбеков; 1 January 1908 – 21 October 1943) was a Soviet career officer-tanker, participant of the Great Patriotic War, master of tank combat, Kazakh, Guards unit lieutenant colonel, awarded: the Medal "For the Defence of Stalingrad" (1943), twice the Order of the Red Banner ( 02/13/1942), the second – posthumously (1943). Killed in battle during the liberation of Kyiv.

== Biography ==
Was born on January 1, 1908, in the Semipalatinsk region of Kazakhstan. He was by nationality Kazakh. As a child, he became an orphan, a homeless child. He graduated from the Kazakh regional school for adolescents in 1925 in Orenburg.

=== Pre-war service ===
During his service, he commanded a cavalry and training tank platoon, a training and separate tank company, and a tank battalion. Having successfully graduated in 1928 among the United Central Asian Military School (OSAVSH) in Tashkent, he was enrolled in the 43rd Cavalry Regiment.

In 1928-1933 platoon commander of the 43rd cavalry regiment took part in the battles in the Karakum sands in 1930, where he was first wounded. He was wounded in the head, received a fracture of his right arm. After recovery, he returned to service, in 1931 underwent retraining at Leningrad Higher Officer Armored School.

Before the start of World War II, GA Adilbekov studied in Moscow at the Military Academy of Armored Forces named after I. V. Stalin, commanded a tank company. G. A. Adilbekov was the only Kazakh who graduated from this academy.

=== Great Patriotic War ===
==== 1941 ====
As part of the active army from the beginning Great Patriotic War – the commander of a tank battalion.

He took part in the battles for the defense of Vitebsk, Trubchevsk, Bryansk. He fought in the Smolensk battle, in Stalingrad, in the defense of Moscow, in the liberation of Kyiv.

In July 1941, Galiy Adilbekovich was the commander of a tank battalion of the 110th tank division. Participated in the battles in which the division struck at the German 7th Panzer Division with the aim of reaching Smolensk and releasing the encircled armies.

After the division of the division into the 141st and 142nd tank brigades, from the end of August to the end of October 1941, Captain GA Adilbekov commanded the 1st tank battalion of heavy and medium tanks of the 141st tank brigade.

At the beginning of the war, there were already two independent publications about him in the central newspapers of the USSR – from September 5, 41 in the newspaper "Vechernyaya Moskva" and on the 13th September 41 in the newspaper "Izvestia"

In the battles near Vitebsk, Trubchevsk in 1941 he performed the first known feat during the war.

On August 31, 18 km west of Trubchevsk, oncoming tank battle, which lasted until September 8. The Soviet 141st Tank Brigade and 108th Panzer Division (about 200 tanks) engaged the superior forces Guderian 47th Motorized Corps (Wehrmacht) (over 300 tanks). The tanks of the 141st brigade went into battle directly from the train trains, without having time to turn around. This made it possible to restore the position of the troops of the 13th Army, replenish it, and, together with the 3rd Army, re-enter the battle. Until mid-September, the enemy was stopped here and driven back to the river Sudost at a distance of more than 40 km. 16 settlements were released. Then, in August–September 1941, it was very important. And by mid-September 1941, the enemy had practically nothing to fight in these places. Every four of Guderian's five tanks were hit. And if he took the cities of the Bryansk region in 1–2 days, then the defense of Trubchevsk, including the "Trubchevsky boiler", will last two months.

As a result of the counter-offensive, the front was turned upside down, the battles were going on in all directions, the tank battalion of G. Adilbekov was surrounded, but continued to carry out the combat mission. Having destroyed the enemy's tank column, which was much larger in number, the battalion smashed the enemy's rear, its military units, and manpower. Coming out of the encirclement with battles, the commander managed to save all his tanks without losing a single one. After these fierce battles, the 141st Panzer Brigade, being in constant counterattacks to contain the German offensive, almost all died, and its remnants joined the 121st Panzer Brigade.

==== 1942 ====
Since March 27, 1942 major Galiy Adilbekovich Adilbekov – deputy commander of the 121st separate tank brigade. His comrade in arms Ivan Yakubovsky (in the future Marshal, twice hero of the Soviet Union, Commander-in-Chief of the Joint Armed Forces of the participating states Warsaw Pact) wrote in his memoirs: “At the head of the corps in the army at that time were such experienced commanders as Major Generals MI Zinkovich and FN Rudkin. The commanders of brigades, regiments, battalions also had rich combat experience... I would like to tell you about one of these commanders here. I mean Lieutenant Colonel G. A. Adilbekov, a Kazakh by nationality. We had known Galiy Adilbekovich since January 1942, when we had a chance to serve and fight together in the ranks of the 121st Tank Brigade. He possessed remarkable moral and fighting qualities: organizational skills, willpower, did not know fear in the fight against the Nazis. And at the same time, he was the most modest man who won over all the soldiers and officers. He, a former homeless child, an orphanage, joined the army as a volunteer back in 1925. After graduating from military school, he participated in battles with bandits in the sands of the Karakum Desert. He was wounded and returned to duty. He began the Great Patriotic War as the commander of a tank battalion. In February 1942 he was awarded the order Red Banner. The battalion led by him destroyed more than twenty tanks and armored vehicles, ten anti-tank guns, and several companies of enemy infantry. The officer never lost his composure in battle, knew how to instill confidence in his subordinates in victory, agitated them with his personal example of courage and high soldier spirit."

In May–August 1942, Galiy Adilbekovich studied in Moscow at the academically advanced training courses for command personnel, after which he was engaged in the formation of the 47th Tank Brigade. From 19.09. until 21.10.1942 lieutenant colonel Adilbekov GA – commander of the 47th separate tank brigade.

From the characteristics of the command: "During the brigade's march to the front, the tanks of G. Adilbekov in the area of the Morozovsky station unexpectedly collided with the enemy, but were able to group up and inflicted significant damage on him."

This episode belongs to the period of the Battle of Stalingrad. During these battles, Galiy Adilbekovich's tank was hit, he has wounded again, burned in the tank, and survived. Awarded Medal "For the Defence of Stalingrad".

==== 1943 ====
From the end of October 1942 to October 21, 1943, Guards Lieutenant Colonel GA Adilbekov was the commander of the separate 47th Guards Breakthrough Tank Regiment. Hero of the Soviet Union (1943), major general of tank forces, commander of the 9th mechanized corps K.A. Malygin recalled: "Among the tank regiments, the 47th Guards Lieutenant Colonel G. A. Adilbekov immediately became the leading ones..."

From 23 September 1943, Soviet troops fought fiercely to retain and expand the Bukrin bridgehead to liberate Kyiv. 10/21/1943 on the Bukrinsky bridgehead during the crossing of the Dnieper and liberation of Kyiv, in Ukraine in the battle at the head of a tank attack, Guards Lieutenant Colonel G. A. Adilbekov died – at the time of his death the only representative of the peoples of Central Asia in the rank of guard lieutenant colonel – commander of a separate guards tank regiment.

== Fighting companions ==
- Yakubovsky I. I. captain – commander of the 121st tank regiment, deputy commander of 121st separate tank brigade, later Marshal of the Soviet Union

== Family ==
- Wife – Adilbekova Menzhian Ilyasovna (née Valieva, an orphan from the age of 9) born in 1912 (the village of Nazarovka, Slavgorod district, Altai Territory)
- Son – Alim Galievich Adilbekov
- Daughter – Adilbekova Roza Galievna
- Adopted daughter – Akhmadieva Farida Shakirovna

== Awards ==
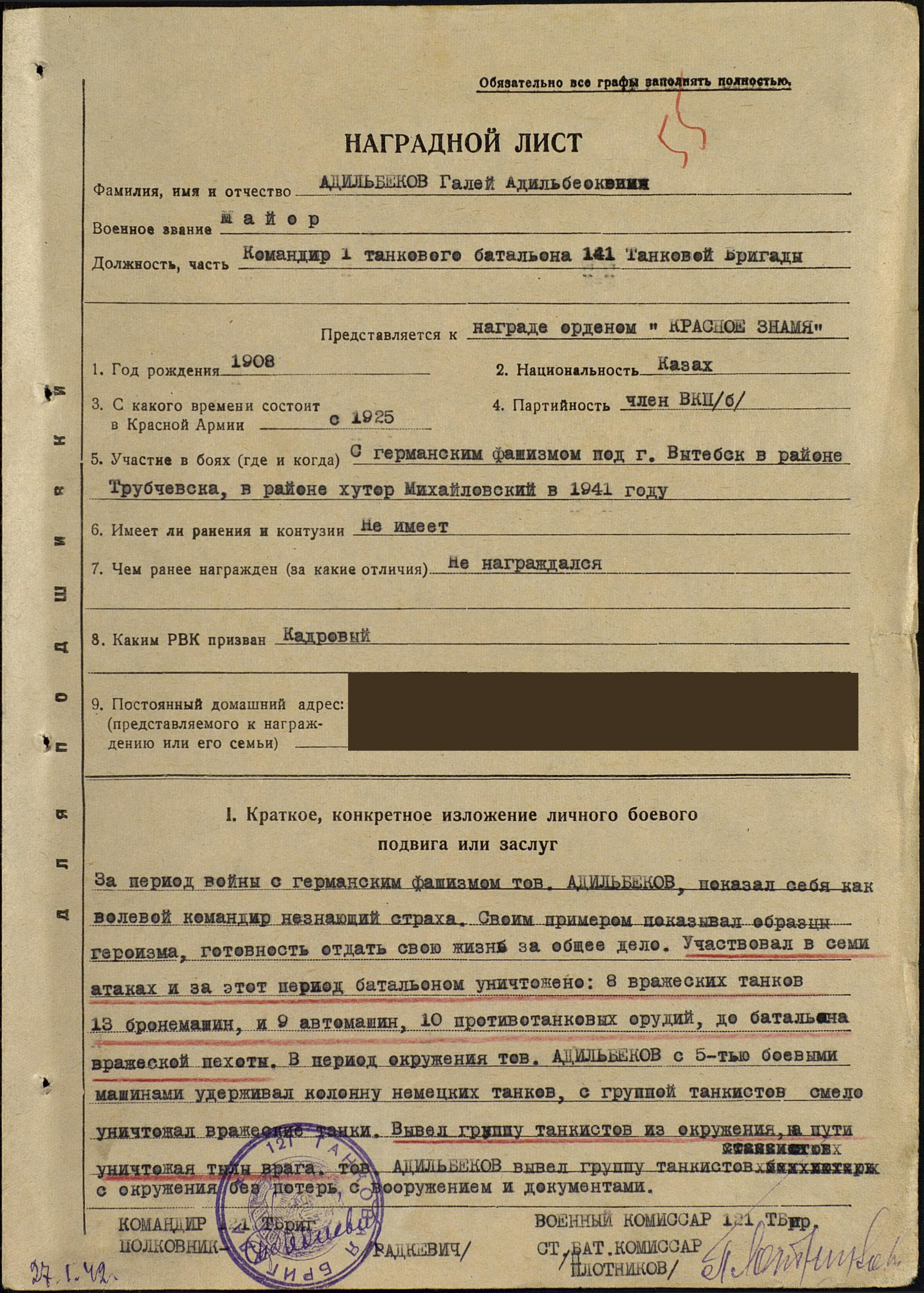
Award list by G. A. Adilbekov dated January 27, 1942

- Medal "For the Defence of Stalingrad" (July 1943)
- Order of the Red Banner (13.02.1942)
- Order of the Red Banner (posthumously 1943)
- "Award Personal Watch" (September 1943)

== Memory ==
- Mass grave in the village of Lukovytsia, Kaniv Raion

- Mass grave in the village of Lukovytsia, Kaniv Raion

Guards Lieutenant Colonel G.A. Adilbekov was buried in the war mass grave village of Lukovytsia, Kaniv Raion, Kyiv Oblast in Ukraine. A museum of military glory has been created at the school, where the memory of the commander Adilbekov G.A. is carefully kept.

In the district officers' house in Almaty, in the museum created by V.I.Panfilova – the daughter of the legendary division commander, a separate stand is dedicated to Galiy Adilbekovich.

== Literature ==
=== Memoirs ===
- Dzhetpysbaev B. "The Soldier's Way". - Publishing house "Kazakhstan". Alma-Ata, 1972. Казахстан. 1972.
- Malygin, Konstantin Alekseevich (1986). "Malygin K. A. "In the center of the battle formation." - Moscow: Military Publishing, 1986".
- "Yakubovskiy I.I. "Earth on Fire". - M., Military Publishing, 1975". 1975.

=== Video ===
- Внук подполковника-танкиста Адильбекова ищет внуков маршала Якубовского и его однополчан [The grandson of Lieutenant Colonel-tanker Adilbekov is looking for the grandchildren of Marshal Yakubovsky and his fellow soldiers] (in Russian). vb_kg – via YouTube.
- "Unknown tank ace, Kazakh Galiy Adilbekov" / Digital Astana // video YouTube
