= 203 mm howitzer M1931 (B-4) =

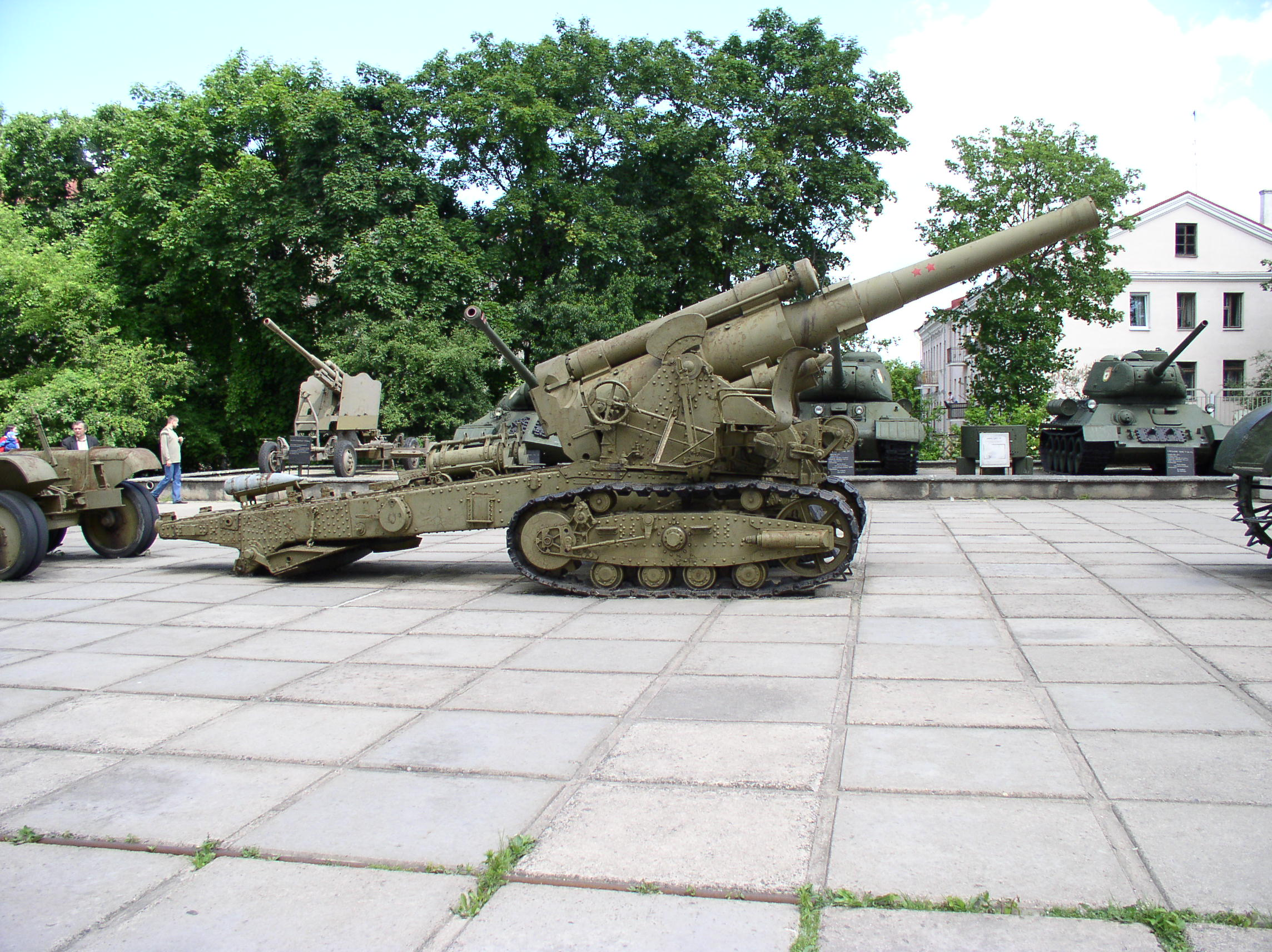
- 203 mm howitzer M1931 (B-4) in Great Patriotic War museum, Minsk, Belarus.
- Type: High-power heavy howitzer
- Place of origin: Soviet Union

Service history
- In service: Soviet Union
- Wars: World War II, Winter War

Production history
- Designer: Nikolai Nikititsch Magdesiew
- Designed: 1931
- Produced: 1932–1945
- No. built: 871

Specifications
- Mass: Combat: 17,700 kg (39,022 lbs); Travel: 19,000 kg (41,888 lbs)
- Length: Travel: 11.15 m (36 ft 7 in)
- Barrel length: Bore: 4.894 m (16 ft 1 in) L/24.1; Overall: 5.087 m (16 ft 8 in) L/25
- Width: Travel: 2.7 m (8 ft 10 in)
- Height: Travel: 2.5 m (8 ft 2 in)
- Crew: 15
- Shell: Separate loading charge and projectile HE: 100 kg (220 lbs)
- Caliber: 203 mm (8 in)
- Breech: Interrupted screw
- Recoil: Hydro-pneumatic
- Carriage: Box trail
- Elevation: 0° to 60°
- Traverse: 8°
- Rate of fire: 1 round every four minutes
- Muzzle velocity: 607 m/s (1,990 ft/s)
- Maximum firing range: 18 km (11 mi)

203 mm howitzer M1931 (B-4) (Russian: 203-мм гаубица обр. 1931 г. (Б-4), GRAU index: 52-G-625) was a 203 mm (8 inch) Soviet high-power heavy howitzer. During the Second World War, it was under the command of the Stavka's strategic reserve. It was nicknamed "Stalin's sledgehammer" by German soldiers. These guns were used with success against Finnish pillboxes at the Mannerheim Line, heavy German fortifications and in urban combat for destroying protected buildings and bunkers. These guns were used until the end of the war in the Battle of Berlin, during which the Red Army used them to smash German fortifications at point blank range with their heavy 203mm shells. In the spring of 1944, a KV-1S tank chassis was used to create a self-propelled variant, the S-51. The heavy recoil from the muzzle blast threw the crew off their seats and damaged the transmission, and so it was cancelled.

With an elevation angle of up to 60 degrees and 12 propellant loads to choose from, the B-4 virtually met all the expectations it was given, capable of crushing its targets via an optimal projectile trajectory.

== History ==
The Artillery Committee (Russian: Артиллерийский комитет), known for short as the Artkom (Russian: Артком), then led by R.A. Durlyakhov, set up an artillery-design bureau in November 1920, with Frantz Lender as its leader. This design bureau was entrusted with work on "a 203mm howitzer with long range" in January 1926, with the Artkom issuing a resolution on December 11, 1926 to "entrust the Artkom design bureau with designing a 203mm howitzer of long range within 46 months". The Bolshevik plant (now Obukhov State Plant) took over after Lender's death in 1927, with the Artkom design bureau charged with designing universal 122mm corps guns and 203/152 mm cannons as Letter No. 51255/12Ya5 specified.

The 203mm howitzer was presented in two variants, namely one with and one without the muzzle brake. The two guns were otherwise identical to each other. Preference was eventually given to the brake-free variant with technical drawings by the Artkom design bureau, and a tracked carriage (a common sight on heavy Soviet artillery pieces) from the Bolshevik plant. The first prototype B-4 howitzer was made in the Bolshevik plant in early 1931. Firing tests took place from July to August 1931 with the aim of choosing appropriate shells for use by the B-4. The howitzer was accepted into service as the 203 mm howitzer model 1931 after extensive field and combat tests in 1933.

== Production ==
Production of the B-4 started simultaneously at the Bolshevik plant and the Barrikady plant (the latter is now Titan-Barrikady), with the latter experiencing serious production difficulties. It was only able to prepare a single howitzer for delivery in 1933, but delivery was not completed. It delivered its first two B-4's during the first half of 1934, delivering a further 13 until the end of the year, after which production at the plant paused until 1938. This pause was due to the aforementioned difficulties and the planned shift to 122 mm A-19 corps gun production. The Bolshevik plant did not do well either, producing 104 howitzers from 1932 to 1936 and 42 in 1937. This caused production to shift back to Stalingrad. 75 howitzers were made there in 1938, and 181 the next year. The Barrikady plant managed a 165-piece batch in 1940, and a further batch of 300 pieces in 1941. The final three howitzers were made in Stalingrad from remaining reserves. The Novokramatorsky plant joined production in 1938/39, producing 49 howitzers in 1938 with the Bolshevik plant, a further 48 in 1939, 3 in 1940 and 26 in 1941. Of the 326 B-4 howitzers made in 1941, 221 were delivered in the first half of 1941, with serial production ending in October 1941, when the final nine howitzers were delivered.

A total of 1011 B-4 howitzers were made from 1932 to 1942.

Technical drawings of the B-4 differed from plant to plant, with their own modifications to facilitate serial production. As a result, despite bearing the common designation of B-4, there were virtually two different models of the howitzers in practical service. Drawings were not unified until 1937, when individual parts and assembly designs, then already tested both in production and in trials, had their layouts changed. The only innovation was the tracked carriage, which allowed firing outright from the ground without any kind of special platforms, unlike many similar weapons. Tracks were also used because the Soviets had invested a great deal into tractor factories during the 1920s and 1930s, making the use of tracks an obvious and economical choice of carriage. Attempts to fully unify howitzer production between the Bolshevik and the Barrikady plant—let alone the late-joiner Novokramatorsky—failed.

36 B-4 howitzers were planned for the 17 howitzer artillery regiments according to the approved August 1939 mobilization plan, alongside 1374 men allocated to each regiment. 13 of these regiments would be allocated two howitzers instead of one.

The total need for the howitzers, at 612 units, was not fully covered until June 1941, when 849 B-4's were placed into service in the Red Army. To cover wartime losses, another 571 units were planned for production.

== Operational history ==
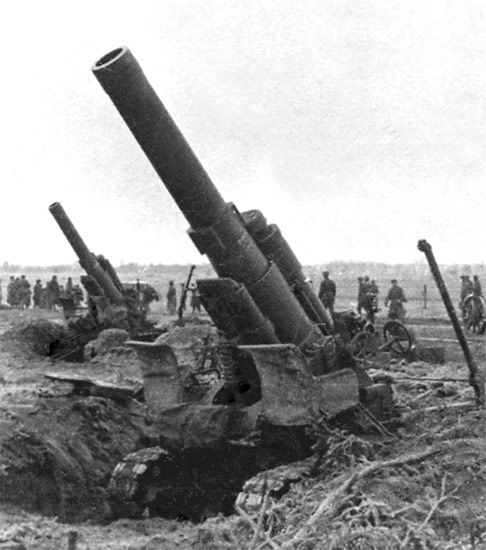
A battery in use, 3rd Belorussian front, summer 1944

The B-4 participated in the Winter War, with 142 howitzers placed along the front on March 1, 1940, of which four were knocked out. The B-4 was also called the "Karelia Sculptor" as Finnish pillboxes hit were virtually turned into a hodge-podge of concrete chunks and iron armatures.

23 B-4's were captured by the German 11th Panzer Division as the town of Dubno was captured at nighttime on June 25, 1941.

A total of 75 B-4 howitzers were lost from June 22 to December 1, 1941, and a further 105 howitzers were built from factories to make up for the loss. After the start of the Great Patriotic War, the Howitzer Regiments were evacuated to the far rear for protection, only returning on November 19, 1942 when the strategic initiative was wrestled back into Soviet hands. These howitzers would still be placed in the strategic reserve all the way up to the end of the war.

Captured B-4's used by the Wehrmacht were given the designation 20.3 cm Haubitze 503/5(R), of which 8 pieces remained at the Eastern Front by March 1944, firing a mix of G-620 concrete-buster and German shells.

B-4 howitzer crews were not given instructions on direct-firing against visible targets, however Captain Ivan Vedmedenko was awarded the title Hero of the Soviet Union for his actions of direct-firing against enemies.

The prototype SU-14 also mounted a B-4 atop its chassis.

== Variants ==
- B-4M − A post-war modernized variant, the original tracked carriage was replaced with a wheeled carriage, allowing long range towing without removing the gun barrel. During firing the wheels are raised and the weapon rests on a firing platform. Like the original, the B-4M is towed by a AT-T artillery tractor.

== Ammunition ==
The B-4 has a separated-charge propellant load, with provisions to use full or 11 types of propellant charges. Propellant weight varied from 3.24 kg all the way up to 15.0-15.5 kg. The B-4 can fire 100 kilogram F-265 (with screwed-in cap) or F-625D high explosive or G-620/G-620T bunker-buster shells weighing 100–146 kg, as well as a 150-kilogram heavy atomic shell with a range of 18 km still in service today. The B-4M was capable of firing the 3BV2 nuclear artillery shell with a range of 18-30km.

Muzzle velocity varied from 288 to 607 m/s for the high-explosive shells depending on propellant charge weight, whereas bunker-buster shells were made to fire at 607 m/s.

== Operators ==
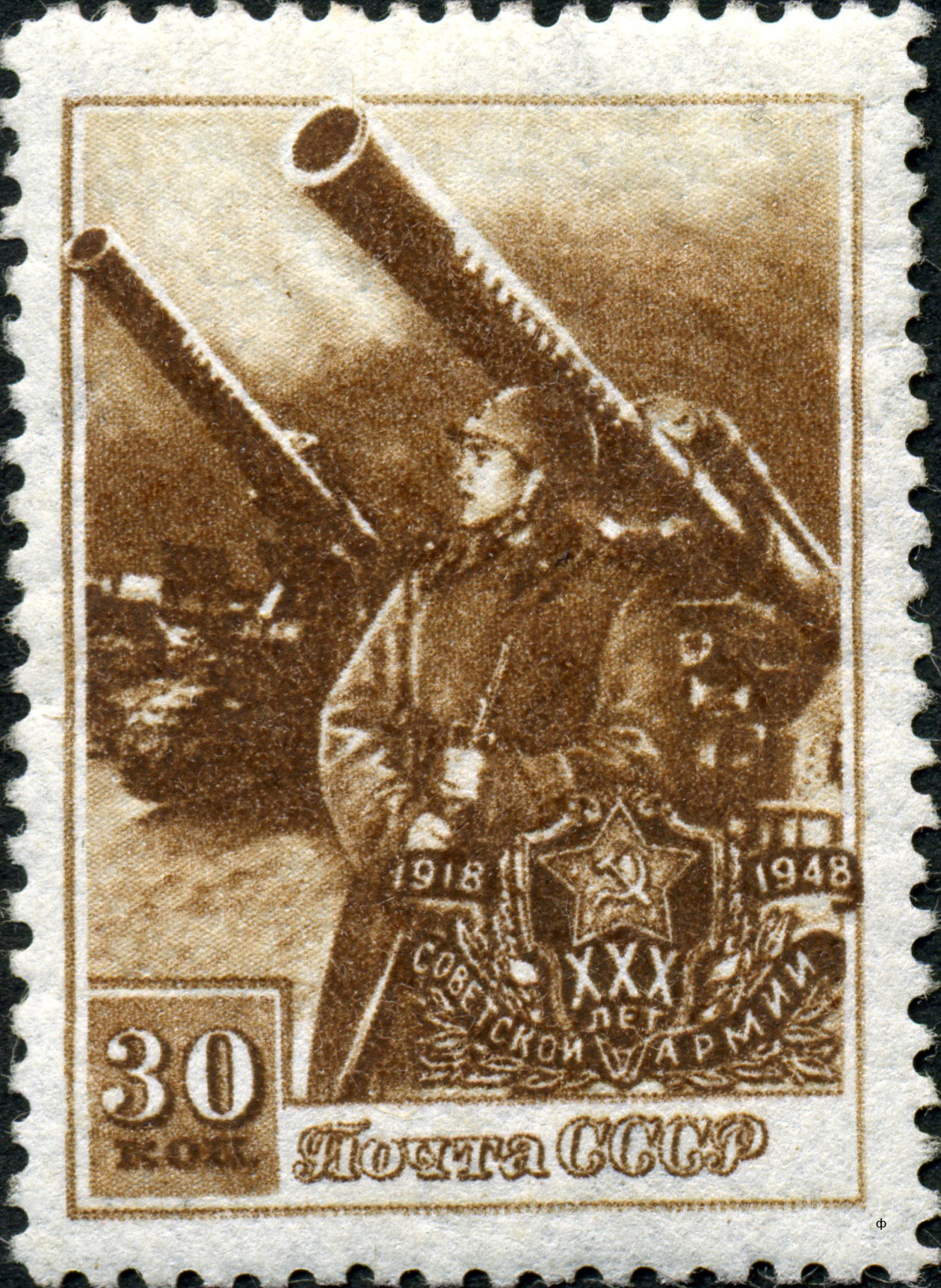
B-4 howitzers depicted in a USSR stamp commemorating the 30th anniversary of the Red Army.

- Bulgaria
- Nazi Germany – Captured
- Poland
- Romania
- Soviet Union − Largely replaced by the 2S7 Pion. The B-4M remained in limited service as late as 1990

== See also ==
- 152 mm gun M1935 (Br-2) shared same carriage
- 280 mm mortar M1939 (Br-5) shared same carriage
- 8 inch Howitzer M1 approximate United States equivalent
- BL 7.2-inch howitzer approximate British equivalent
- 2S7 Pion/Malka modern Soviet/Russian 203 mm artillery piece

== Bibliography ==
- Bailey, J. B. A. (2003). Field Artillery And Fire Power. Routledge. ISBN 978-1-135-47812-4.
- Department of the Army, United States (1960). Handbook on the Satellite Armies. Washington, DC: Headquarters, Department of the Army.
- Foss, Christopher F, ed. (1990). Jane's Armour and Artillery 1990−1991 (11th ed.). Surrey: Jane's Information Group. ISBN 0-7106-0909-4.
- Lomachenko, Col. S. V.; Bulatov, Col. O. G.; Gavrilovich, Col S. L. (2001). Varavitskaya, Alla (ed.). "Heavy Artillery: Notes on Evolution". Military Thought. 10 (2). East Views Publications: 1–7.
- Shunkov V. N. - The Weapons of the Red Army, Mn. Harvest, 1999 (Шунков В. Н. - Оружие Красной Армии. — Мн.: Харвест, 1999.) ISBN 985-433-469-4
- Zaloga, Steven J. (2013). Defense of the Rhine 1944–45. Bloomsbury Publishing. ISBN 978-1-84908-388-1.
