= 152 mm gun M1935 (Br-2) =

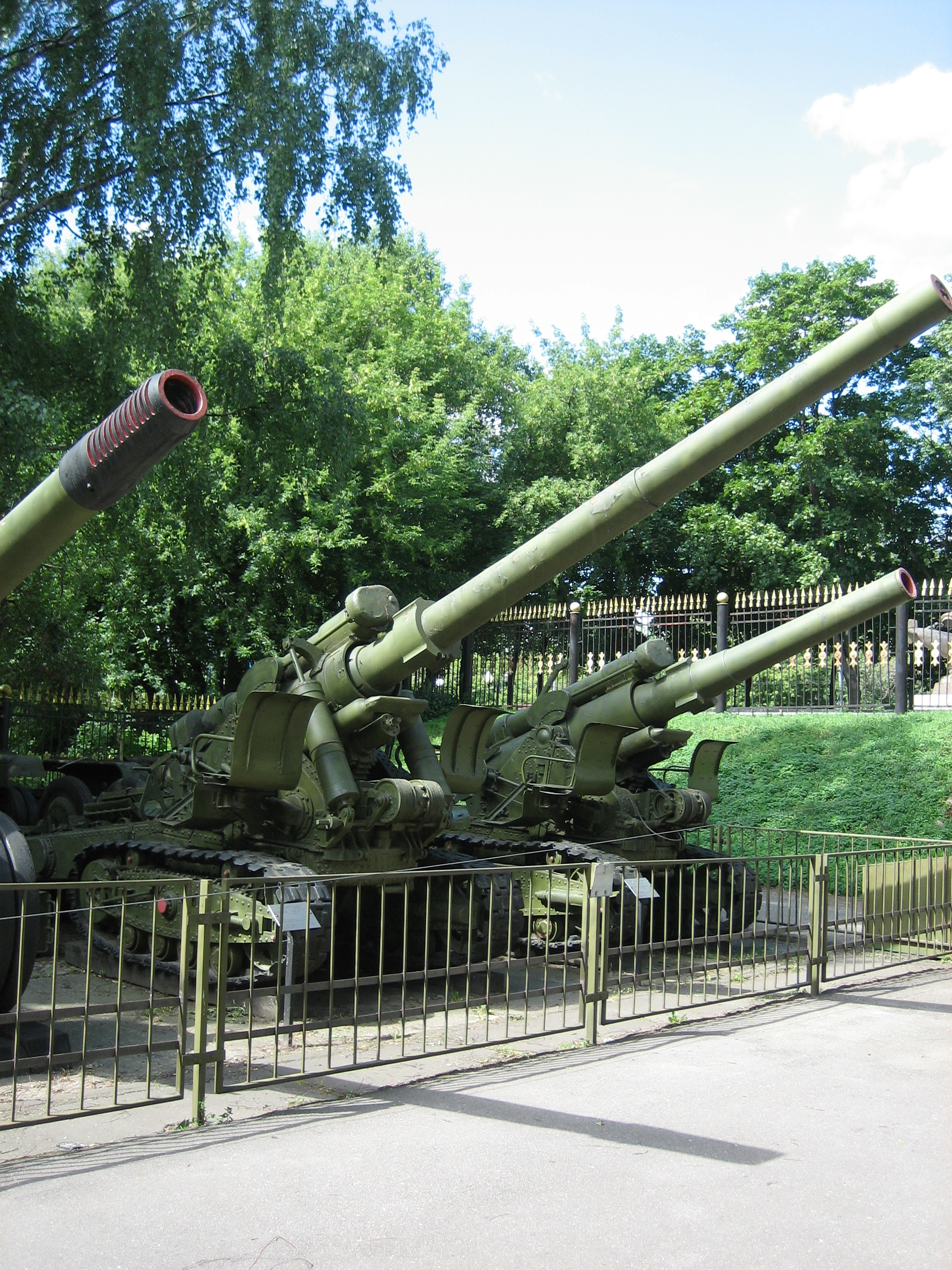
- Br-2 in the Central Museum of Armed Forces, Moscow.
- Type: Heavy gun
- Place of origin: Soviet Union

Service history
- Wars: World War II

Production history
- Designer: Barrikady
- Manufacturer: Barrikady
- Produced: 1937–1940
- No. built: 37+

Specifications
- Mass: Combat: 18,200 kg (40,100 lb); Travel: 19,500 kg (43,000 lb)
- Barrel length: Bore: 7 m (23 ft) L/45.9; Overall: 7.17 m (23 ft 6 in) L/47.2
- Crew: 15
- Caliber: 152.4 mm (6.00 in)
- Breech: interrupted screw
- Recoil: hydro-pneumatic
- Carriage: single trail, tracked
- Elevation: 0° to 60°
- Traverse: 8°
- Rate of fire: 0.5 rounds per minute
- Effective firing range: 24,740 m

152 mm gun M1935 (Br-2) (Russian: 152-мм пушка обр. 1935 г. (Бр-2)) was a Soviet 152.4 mm heavy gun, produced in limited numbers by the Barrikady Plant in Stalingrad in the late 1930s. The most unusual feature of the gun was its tracked carriage, shared by a number of Soviet heavy artillery systems of the interwar period. Despite a number of drawbacks, most notably limited mobility and short service life of the barrel, the weapon was employed throughout the German-Soviet War; an upgraded variant with wheeled carriage, Br-2M, remained in service at least until the 1970s.

== Development and production ==
=== B-10 ===
Work on a long range 152 mm gun for Reserve of the Main Command units started in 1929, when the Bolshevik Plant in Saint Petersburg received from the Artillery Directorate requirements specifications for such a piece. The project received a factory index B-10. First barrel was manufactured in April 1932; it was sent for trials even before the carriage, which had an unusual tracked construction, was ready. Development and testing of the B-10 continued until 1935; a number of problems were revealed, including slow elevation, low rate of fire and short service life. As a result, the gun was not adopted. The two produced barrels were experimentally modified for firing pre-rifled projectiles and polygonal projectiles respectively. The experiments didn't produce practical results. An attempt to improve elevation speed by use of an electric motor failed to provide smooth elevation. The Soviet Navy briefly considered adopting a derived weapon as a coastal gun, in towed or self-propelled variant, the latter based on T-28 medium tank chassis. Only the towed variant, B-25, reached factory trials; eventually it was canceled because of shortcomings of the design and decision of the Army not to adopt the B-10.

=== B-30 and Br-2 ===
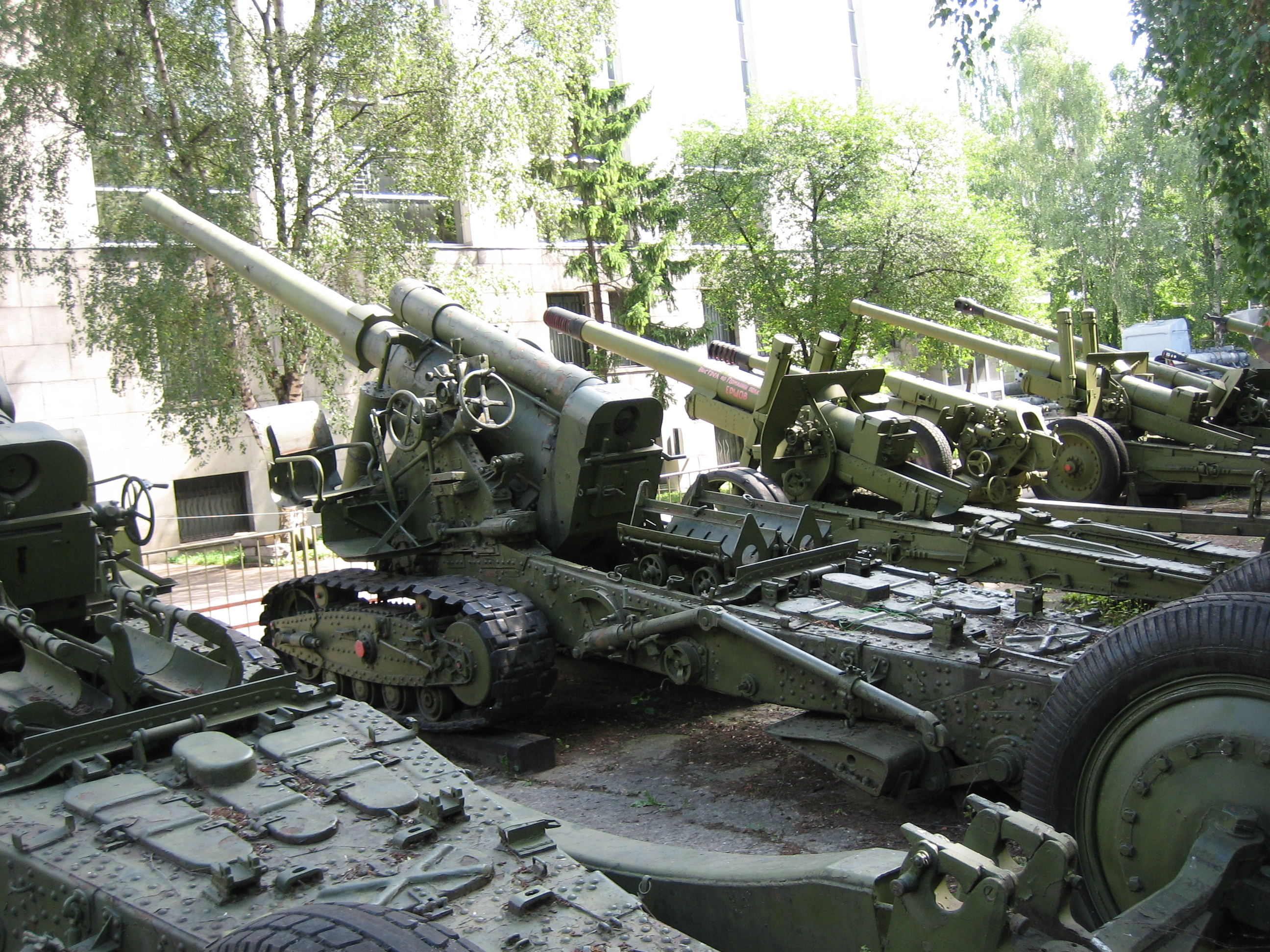
Br-2, rear view

In the early 1930s the Artillery Directorate ordered a development of a "heavy artillery triplex", consisting of a 152 mm gun, a 203 mm howitzer and a 280 mm mortar utilizing the same carriage. The Bolshevik Plant and the Barrikady Plant in Stalingrad were entrusted with the development. The 152 mm gun projects were called B-30 (sometimes referred to as B-10-2-30) and Br-2 respectively. Both mated a barrel ballistically identical to that of the B-10, to a tracked carriage of the 203 mm howitzer M1931 (B-4).

Late in 1936, the Bolshevik Plant delivered an experimental series of six pieces. A number of longer (55 calibres) barrels and a number of barrels with deeper rifling were manufactured. The B-30 barrels were also used for ultimately unsuccessful experiments with pre-rifled shells and with "Ansaldo system" variable depth rifling.

While generally similar to the competing design, the Br-2 had different barrel construction (built-up vs loose liner), slightly different breechblock and featured an equilibrating mechanism.

Despite results of trials, which favored the B-30, the Artillery Directorate decided to adopt the Br-2. The reasons for the decision are not clear. However, it was decided to switch to free tube barrel construction in production pieces, making the gun somewhat more similar to the B-30.

=== Improved variants ===
Although the Br-2 was adopted, it was evident that the gun had significant drawbacks. One of the problems was very short life of the barrel: it took about 100 shots for the muzzle velocity to drop 4%. In an attempt to tackle the problem, an experimental piece with longer (55 calibers) barrel was produced; another experimental barrel had smaller chamber and deeper rifling. The latter solution was eventually preferred and from 1938 a variant with deep rifling replaced the original barrel in production. It was claimed that the new variant had five times longer service life. However, service life of the new barrel was measured using different criterion (10% drop in muzzle velocity), so actual improvement was probably much smaller.

Another drawback of the gun was its low mobility, aggravated by separate transportation of the barrel. Attempts to improve the tracked carriage (such as the experimental T-117, which was tried out in 1939) were ultimately unsuccessful. In 1938 the Artillery Directorate issued specifications for a wheeled carriage for the Br-2 and the 203 mm howitzer M1931 (B-4). The project was handled by the design bureau of Plant no. 172 (located in Perm), headed by F. F. Petrov. Because the design bureau was busy with other tasks, the development of the new carriage – factory index M-50 – advanced slowly; it never advanced past the design phase and was canceled after the outbreak of the German-Soviet War. An improved wheeled cart Br-15 for barrel transportation was considered in 1940 but was never adopted, because it couldn't improve the mobility of the carriage. It took until 1955 to develop a variant of the Br-2 – designated Br-2M – which had wheeled carriage and didn't require separate transportation.

The Br-2 was also used in a number of unsuccessful experiments with discarding sabot shells, intended to increase range. These included experiments carried out in 1940, with 162 mm barrel firing 162/100 mm shells. The barrel was damaged during the experiments; additionally, the gun was found to have unsatisfactory ballistics and problems with loading. Firing 152/107 mm shells failed to produce significant improvement in range.

=== Br-19 ===
The Br-19 was an experimental piece which combined elements of late production Br-2 (breechblock, barrel with deep rifling) with elements of B-30. The gun was tried out in 1939; it found superior to the Br-2 and was recommended for production, which, however, never started.

=== Br-21 ===
The Br-21 was an experimental 180 mm gun developed privately at the Barrikady Plant by mating Br-2 barrel bored out to the 180 mm caliber to carriage of B-4. The gun reached trials on 20 December 1939. The gun turned out to be more powerful and accurate than the Br-2, but was never adopted, because of the need to produce a new ammunition.

=== Production ===
The Br-2 was in production from 1936 or 1937 to 1940. At least 37 pieces were manufactured. Early pieces had barrels with the original "shallow" rifling (at least seven, built in 1936–37), while late production pieces had barrels with the newer "deep" rifling (27 in 1939–40).

== Description ==
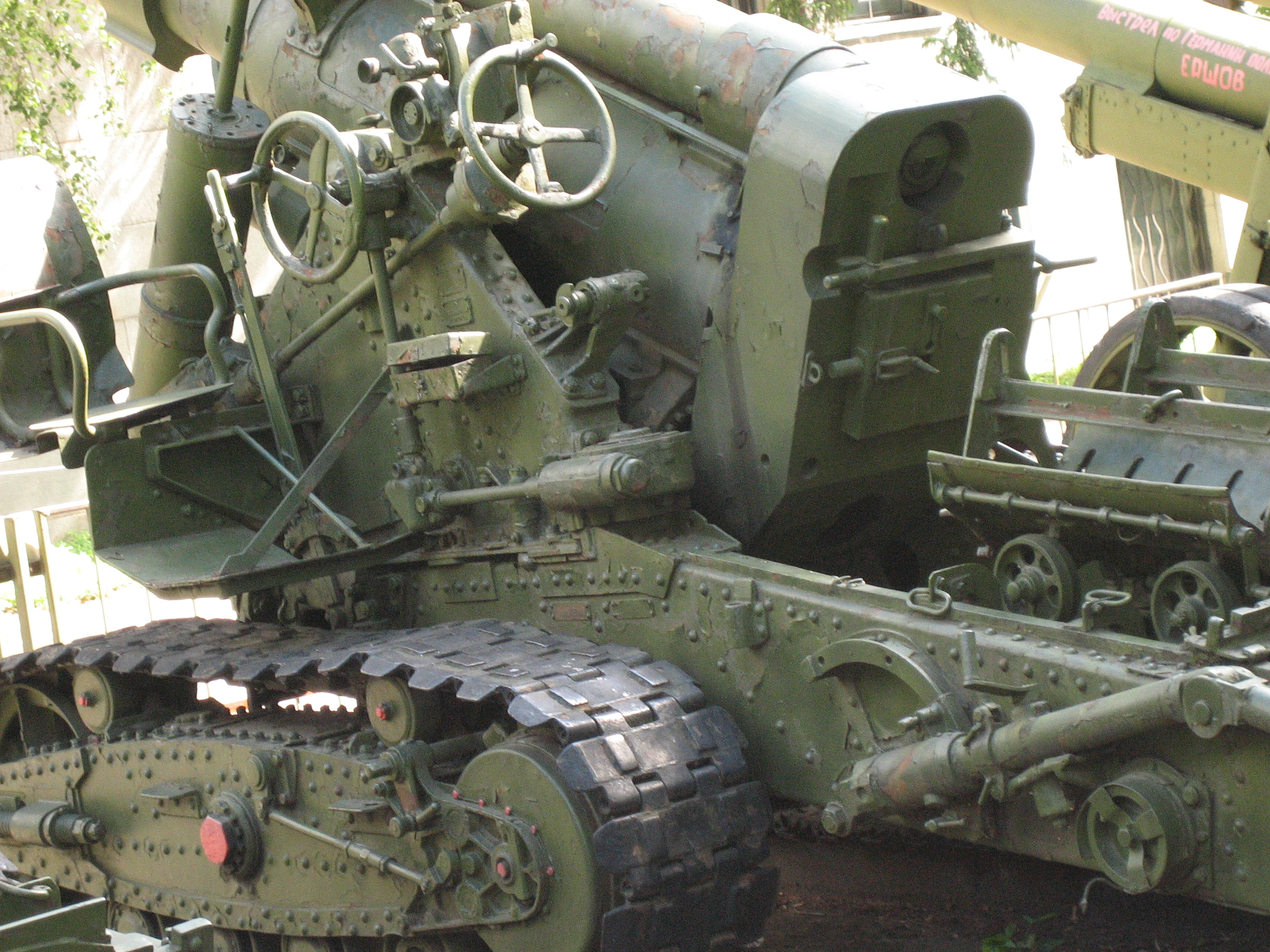
Br-2, breech and controls

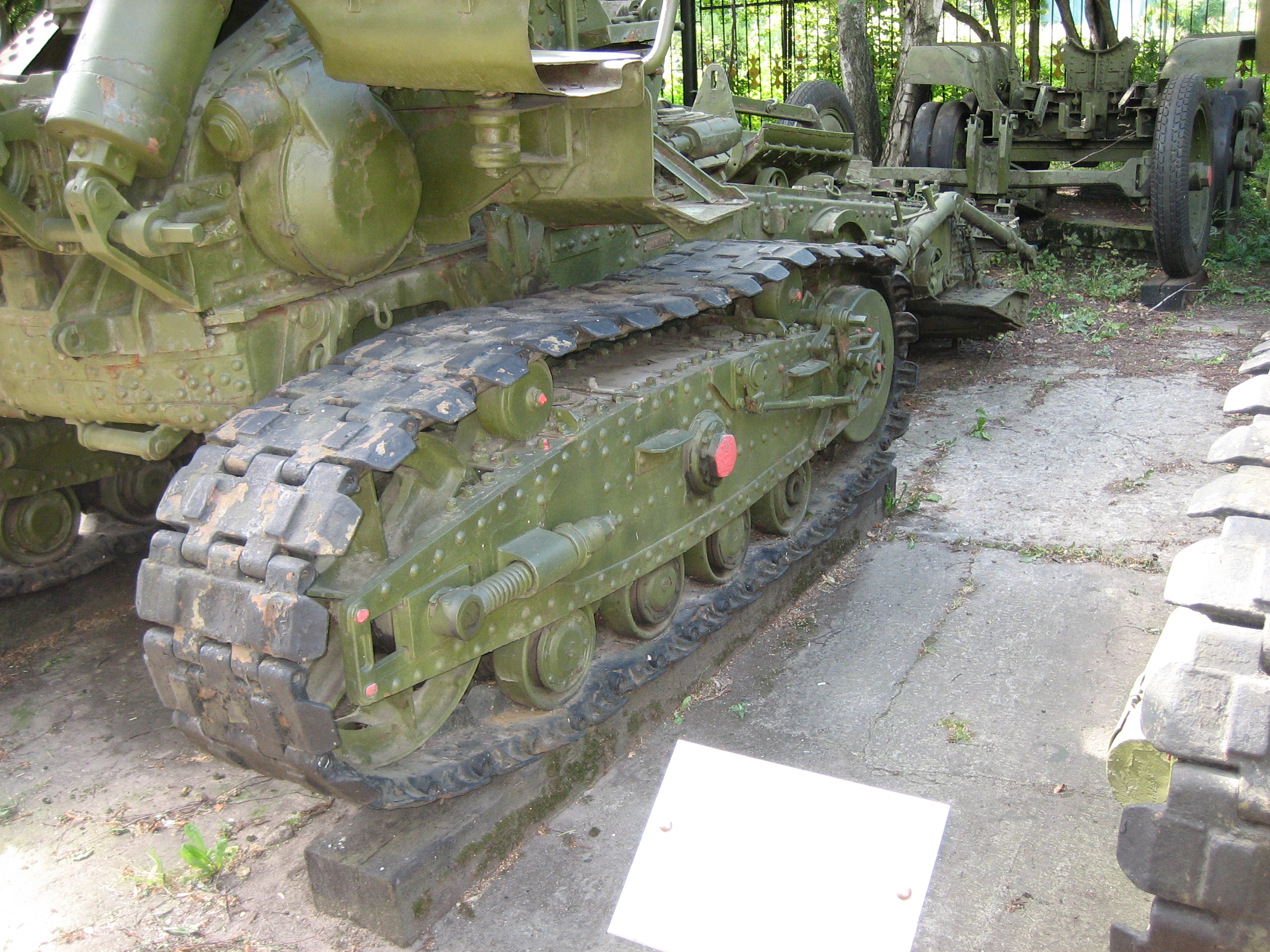
Br-2, track

The Br-2 had a long – 47.2 calibers – barrel of free-tube construction, with interrupted screw breech. The recoil system with variable recoil length consisted of hydraulic recoil buffer and hydro-pneumatic recuperator. The gun utilized bag loading ammunition. For assistance in loading, a special hoisting crane was used.

The single trail tracked carriage was essentially the same as used for the 203 mm howitzer M1931 (B-4) and the 280 mm mortar M1939 (Br-5). It included an equilibrating mechanism of pushing type. The carriage allowed transportation of the weapon to short distances with the speed of 5–8 km/h. For longer distances, the barrel was removed from the carriage and transported separately on a special cart. In this case, it took from 45 minutes to two hours to prepare the weapon for combat.

Several types of carts were used for barrel transportation. Guns produced in 1937 received the Br-6 cart. Other types used were the wheeled Br-10 (11.1 tons with the barrel) and the tracked Br-29 (13.42 tons with the barrel). In the trials report of 7 August 1938 both were referred to as unsatisfactory; the former because of bad passability and the latter because of excessive weight.

For transportation of carriages, Voroshilovets tracked gun tractors were used. Less powerful Komintern tracked gun tractors were employed to pull gun carts.

== Organization and service ==
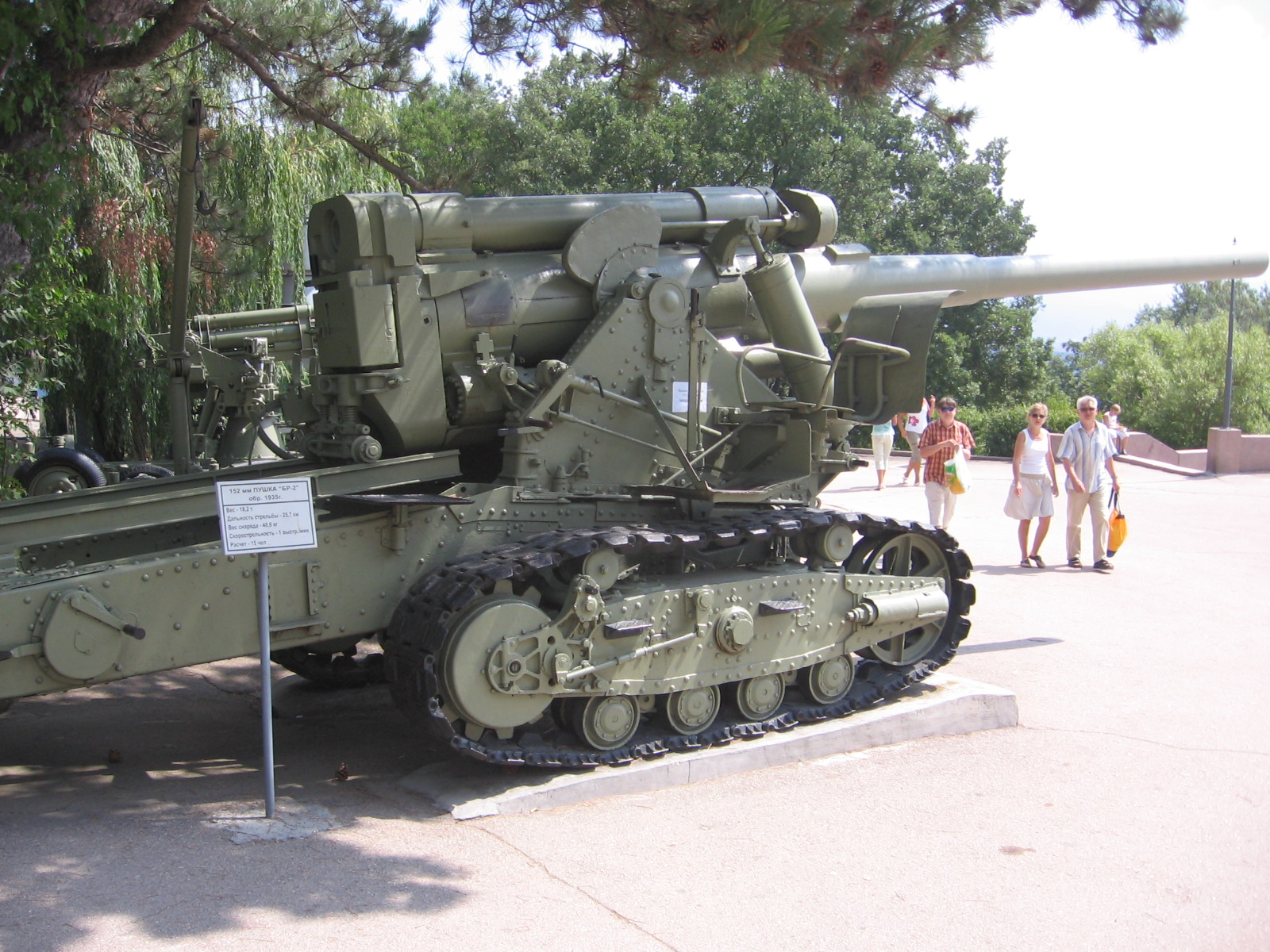
Br-2 in the Museum of Heroic Defense and Liberation of Sevastopol

As of June 1941, the Br-2 guns were issued to the heavy gun regiment of the Reserve of the Main Command. The regiment consisted of four battalions, each with three two-gun batteries, totaling 24 pieces. Two independent two-gun batteries also existed. After the outbreak of the German-Soviet War, the gun was employed by independent six-gun battalions. Later the organization was changed once again, to super heavy gun regiments of four two-gun batteries, totaling six Br-2 and two 210 mm gun M1939 (Br-17). By May 1945, the Red Army had four such regiments.

The Br-2 (or possibly B-30) saw combat in the Winter War against Finland, one piece was lost. As of June 1941, the RKKA possessed 37 or 38 pieces, of them 24 in the aforementioned heavy artillery regiment and further four in two independent batteries. These batteries were given to the Arkhangelsk military district for use as coastal artillery. The rest of the guns, mainly early production guns with shallow rifling and experimental pieces, remained in storage depots and proving grounds. There is only a fragmentary information of the actual combat use of the Br-2. Some sources mention the guns being used in the Battle of Kursk; the 8th Guards Army employed them in the Battle of the Seelow Heights. By the end of the war, Reserve of the Main Command still had 28 pieces, so apparently none were lost.

The modernized Br-2M remained in service at least until the 1970s.

Surviving pieces can be seen in the Central Armed Forces Museum (Moscow), in the Artillery Museum (Saint Petersburg) and on the Sapun Mountain (Sevastopol).

== Variants ==
- Br-2 with built-up barrel – experimental piece.
- Br-2 with shallow rifling – at least seven pieces manufactured in 1936–37.
- Br-2 with 162 mm barrel – experimental piece.
- Br-2 with deep rifling – 27 pieces in 1939–40.
- Br-2M – Br-2 barrel on a new wheeled carriage, adopted in 1955.

== Self-propelled mounts ==
The only self-propelled mount of the Br-2 was a variant of the experimental SU-14, based on the chassis of the T-35 heavy tank with elements of T-28 medium tank, and intended to carry either 203 mm howitzer or 152 mm gun. The prototype armed with Br-2 is referred to as SU-14Br-2. In Autumn 1941 the experimental piece shelled German forces from Kubinka proving ground. The vehicle is still on display in the Kubinka Tank Museum.

== Ammunition ==
The Br-2 fired specially developed ammunition. The shallow rifling pieces and the deep rifling ones also used different projectiles. High explosive / fragmentation and anti-concrete projectiles were produced; there is some indication that chemical and "special" (i.e. nuclear) projectiles also existed, though it is not completely clear. The bagged charge allowed three charges – full, no. 1 and no. 2.

Ammunition for the pieces with deep rifling.
Type	Model	Weight, kg	HE weight, kg	Muzzle velocity, m/s	Range, m
HE-Frag	OF-551	48.9	6.53	880	25,000
Anti-concrete	G-551	49.0

Ammunition for the pieces with shallow rifling
Type	Model	Weight, kg	HE weight, kg	Muzzle velocity, m/s	Range, m
HE-Frag	OF-550	49.0	7.0	880	27,000
Anti-concrete	G-550	49.0
