= Slovo Kyrgyzstana =

- Type: Daily newspaper
- Founder: Government of Kyrgyz Republic
- Publisher: Publishing house "Slovo Kyrgyzstana"
- Founded: March 23, 1925
- Political alignment: Pro-government
- Language: Russian
- Headquarters: Bishkek
- ISSN: 1694-5492
- Website: www.slovo.kg

Slovo Kyrgyzstana (Russian: Слово Кыргызстана, The Word of Kyrgyzstan) is an all-nation Russian language newspaper published in Kyrgyzstan. It was established on 23 March 1925 as Batratskaya Pravda, then changed its name to Krest'yanskiy Put', from 1927 it was known as Sovetskaya Kirgiziya, and from February 1991 to present - as Slovo Kyrgyzstana. In 1961, the newspaper was awarded the Order of the Red Banner of Labour.

In 1975, Slovo Kyrgyzstana had a daily circulation of 132,000 copies. In the 2000s its circulation dropped to 6,000 and it became biweekly.

== See also ==
- List of newspapers in Kyrgyzstan
