= Dina Maslova =

Kyrgyz journalist (born 1984)

- Дина Маслова
- Born: September 23, 1984 (age 41); Bishkek
- Occupation: Journalist
- Employer: Vecherniy Bishkek

Dina Maslova, also Dinara Maslova, in Kyrgyz: Дина Маслова (born 23 September 1984) is a journalist from Kyrgyzstan and is an online editor of Vecherniy Bishkek.

== Career ==
Maslova studied at the Faculty of Journalism of the Kyrgyz-Russian Slavic University in Bishkek. After completing her studies, she worked as a reporter for the Vecherniy Bishkek newspaper, where she became a special correspondent in January 2008. Since 2011 she has been in charge of the newspaper's online editorial team. For two years (2009–2010) she worked in the secretariat of the President of the Kyrgyz Republic Kurmanbek Bakiyev. She organizes the annual international festival "Red Jolbors Fest" and provides training in business advertising.

From 2010 to 2011 Maslova had to be accompanied by a bodyguard, since she repeatedly received threats because of her journalistic activities. For example, a 2010 article, entitled "The Main Law of the National Mosaic" was not well received by some high-ranking Kyrgyz officials. Asimshan Ibrahimov, who was head of the national body for the national language at the time, asked for Maslova to be expelled from Kyrgyzstan for this. In 2017 lawsuits were filed against the media agency Zanoza.kg, which Maslova worked for and as a result she faced charges of libel and reputational damage against the president. According to Justice for Journalists, she was found guilty, fined, forbidden from leaving the country and placed under house arrest.

In 2019 Maslova was presented with the Kyrgyz Information Technologies Forum (KIT) Project Award for her work on the social media platform Bilesinbi.kg. The platform provides an anonymous space for young people to ask questions relating to health and sexuality.

== Family ==
Maslova is the grand-daughter of Kyrgyzstan's national writer, Mukhtar Borbugulov.
