= Medal "For the Defence of Stalingrad" =

Military decoration of the Soviet Union

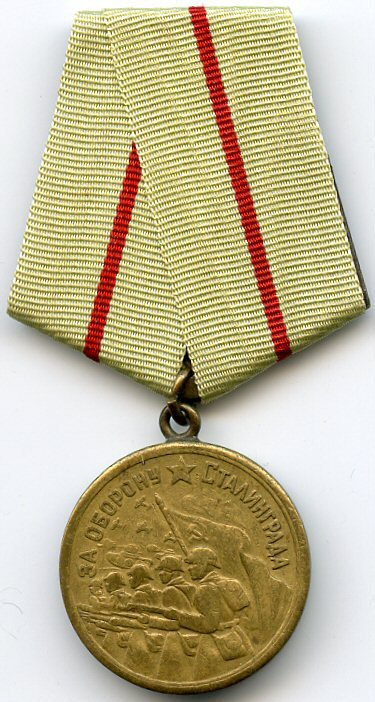
- Medal "For the Defence of Stalingrad" (obverse)
- Type: Campaign medal
- Awarded for: Participation in the defence of Stalingrad
- Presented by: USSR
- Eligibility: Citizens of the Soviet Union
- Status: No longer awarded
- Established: 22 December 1942

Highlights
- Total: 759,560
- Ribbon of the Medal "For the Defence of Stalingrad"

Precedence
- Next (higher): Medal "For the Defence of Sevastopol"
- Next (lower): Medal "For the Defence of Kiev"

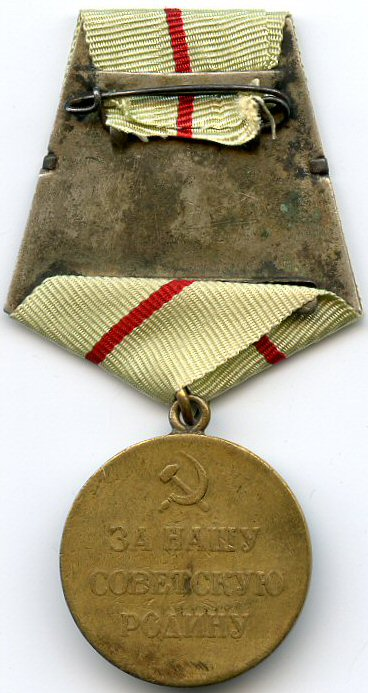
Reverse of the Medal "For the Defence of Stalingrad"

The Medal "For the Defence of Stalingrad" (Russian: Медаль «За оборону Сталинграда», romanised: Medal' "Za oboronu Stalingrada") was a World War II campaign medal of the Soviet Union.

== Medal history ==
The Medal "For the Defence of Stalingrad" was established on 22 December 1942 by decree of the Presidium of the Supreme Soviet of the USSR. The medal's statute was amended on 18 July 1980 by decree of the Presidium of the Supreme Soviet of the USSR № 2523-X.

== Medal statute ==
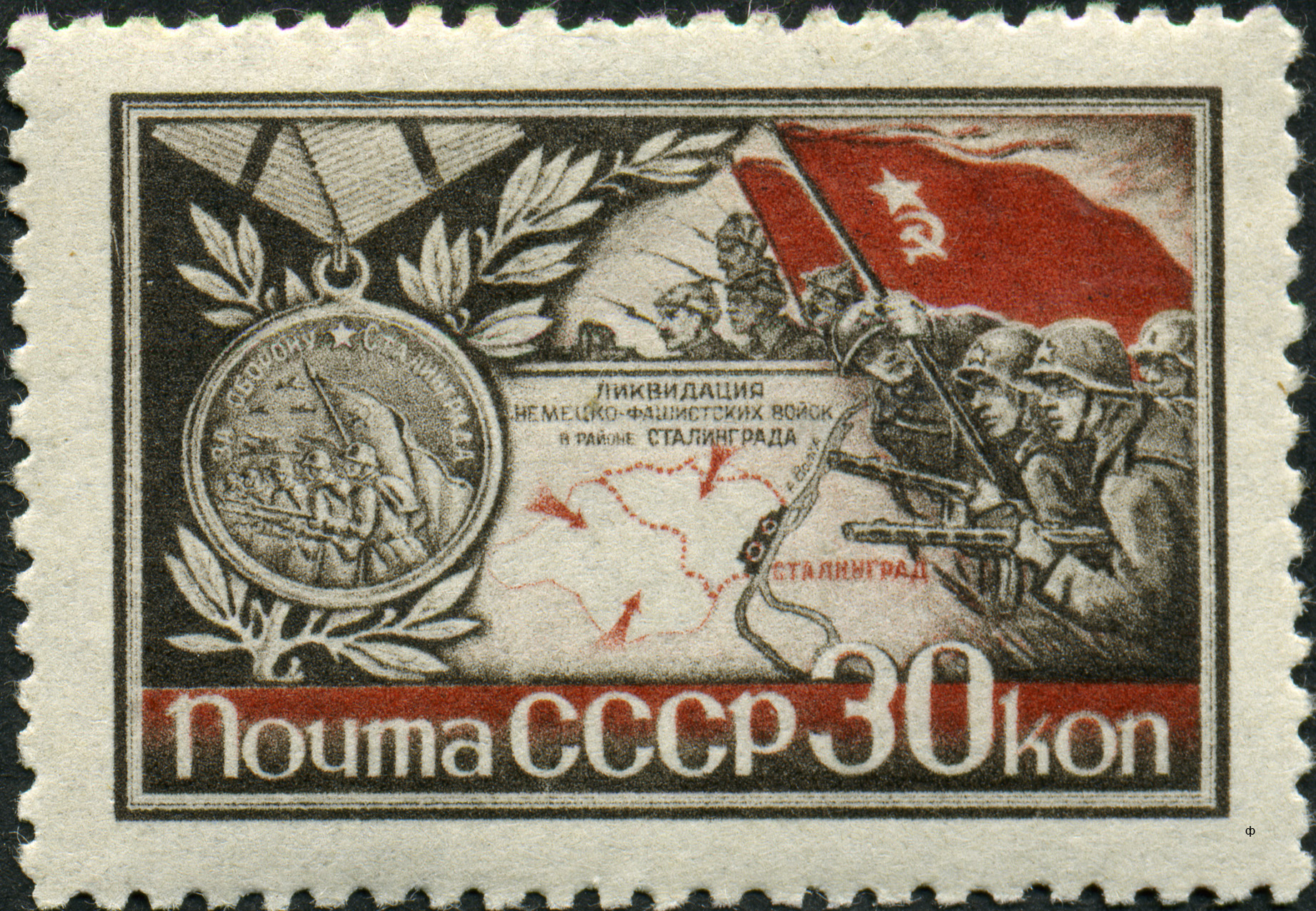
The medal depicted on a 1944 stamp; text at centre reads "Liquidation of German Fascist troops in the Stalingrad region."

The Medal "For the Defence of Stalingrad" was awarded to all participants in the defence of Stalingrad—soldiers of the Red Army, Navy and troops of the NKVD, as well as persons from the civilian population who took part in the defence of Stalingrad during its siege by Axis forces.

Award of the medal was made on behalf of the Presidium of the Supreme Soviet of the USSR on the basis of documents attesting to actual participation in the defence of Stalingrad issued by the unit commander, the chief of the military medical establishment or by a relevant provincial or municipal authority. Serving military personnel received the medal from their unit commander, retirees from military service received the medal from a regional, municipal or district military commissioner in the recipient's community, members of the civilian population, participants in the defence of Stalingrad received their medal from regional or city Councils of People's Deputies.

The Medal "For the Defence of Stalingrad" was worn on the left side of the chest and in the presence of other awards of the USSR, was located immediately after the Medal "For the Defence of Sevastopol". If worn in the presence of Orders or medals of the Russian Federation, the latter have precedence.

== Medal description ==
The Medal "For the Defence of Stalingrad" was a 32mm in diameter circular brass medal with a raised rim. On its obverse, a row of five overlapping fully equipped soldiers with their rifles at the ready marching to the left, above the two rightmost soldiers, the Soviet flag waving; above the others, tanks and combat aircraft also pointing to the left. At the top in the center, a relief five pointed star, on either side of the star along the upper medal circumference, the relief inscription "FOR THE DEFENCE OF STALINGRAD" (Russian: «ЗА ОБОРОНУ СТАЛИНГРАДА»). On the reverse near the top, the relief image of the hammer and sickle, below the image, the relief inscription in three rows "FOR OUR SOVIET MOTHERLAND" (Russian: «ЗА НАШУ СОВЕТСКУЮ РОДИНУ»).

The Medal "For the Defence of Stalingrad" was secured by a ring through the medal suspension loop to a standard Soviet pentagonal mount covered by a 24mm wide olive green silk moiré ribbon with a 2mm central red stripe.

== Recipients (partial list) ==
The individuals below were all recipients of the Medal "For the Defence of Stalingrad".

- Battle of Stalingrad sniper Vasily Grigoryevich Zaytsev
- Hero of the Soviet Union earned at Stalingrad Colonel General Aleksandr Ilich Rodimtsev
- Order of Suvorov earned at Stalingrad, Lieutenant General Vasily Mikhaylovich Badanov
- Sapper Vladimir Fedorovich Chekalov
- Master of tank combat, Guards unit lieutenant colonel Galiy Adilbekovich Adilbekov
- Combat pilot Captain Mariya Ivanivna Dolina
- Marshal of Aviation Fedor Yakovlevich Falaleyev
- Designer of artillery and rocket systems, Hero of Socialist Labour, Georgy Ivanovich Sergeev
- Marshal of Artillery Vasily Ivanovich Kazakov
- Army General Mikhail Sergeevich Malinin
- Marshal of Aviation Serhi Gnatovich Rudenko
- Major Gabriel Ilyich Urazovsky
- War correspondent Pyotr Andreyevich Pavlenko
- Army General Semion Pavlovich Ivanov
- Marshal of the Soviet Union Georgy Konstantinovich Zhukov
- Marshal of the Soviet Union Semyon Konstantinovich Timoshenko
- Marshal of the Soviet Union Vasily Ivanovich Chuikov
- Marshal of the Soviet Union Aleksandr Mikhaylovich Vasilevsky
- Marshal of the Soviet Union Ivan Ignatyevich Yakubovsky
- Marshal of the Soviet Union Fyodor Ivanovich Tolbukhin
- Marshal of the Soviet Union Sergey Semyonovich Biryuzov
- Marshal of the Soviet Union Sergey Fyodorovich Akhromeyev
- Physicist Anatoly Petrovich Alexandrov
- Marshal of the Soviet Union Petr Kirillovich Koshevoi
- Army General Yakov Grigorevich Kreizer
- Colonel General Oka Gorodovikov

== See also ==
- Awards and decorations of the Soviet Union
- Volgograd
- Hero City
