= SU-14 =

SU-14 Heavy Self-Propelled Gun
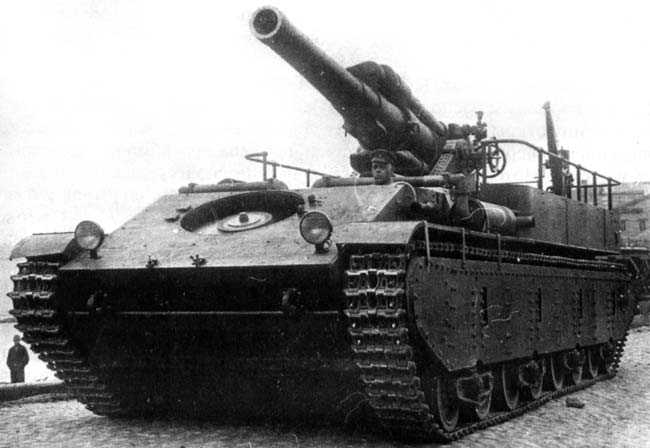
- Prototype SU-14 during trials in 1934.
- Type: Self-propelled gun
- Place of origin: Soviet Union

Production history
- Designed: 1933
- Produced: 1934
- No. built: 2 prototypes (1 SU-14 and 1 SU-14-1)
- Variants: SU-14-1

Specifications
- Crew: 7 or 8
- Armor: Front: 20 mm Side: 6-10 mm (1934 version); Front: 50 mm Side: 30-60 mm (1940 version)
- Main armament: 203mm howitzer M1931 (B-4) or 152mm gun M1935 (Br-2) or 152mm naval gun (B-30)
- Secondary armament: 2-4 DT machine guns
- Engine: M-17-1T diesel 680 hp
- Suspension: Coil spring
- Maximum speed: 22-25 km/h

The SU-14 was a prototype Soviet heavy self-propelled gun that started out as an open topped vehicle, with the armor being added later on when it was converted into a direct-fire assault gun in 1941. The original prototype, using a modified T-28 chassis, mounted a 203 mm gun B-4 and by 1937 a 152 mm naval gun B-30; the SU-14-1 variant of 1936, using a T-35 chassis, mounted the 203 mm gun B-4 and later the 152 mm gun M1935 (Br-2). Neither version ever entered serial production.

== Development ==
Work on the SPG begun in 1933, originally intended to mount the 203 mm howitzer M1931 (B-4) on the T-28 chassis, a quite modern design, as the B-4 had just been recently accepted into service. The prototype was built in July 1934, and the first trials took place in August. Gunnery trials were successful, but mobility trials ended in failure. The use of T-28 components on such a heavy vehicle was a mistake, and so it was decided to use the components of the more robust T-35. A total of 8 changes were made to the running gear, the same number for the transmission, and 10 changes in equipment all using T-35 components. The same year, a decision was made to build a second prototype, using the T-35 chassis from the start, indexed SU-14-1.

The SU-14-1 prototype entered trials in 1936, however, the vehicle was accepted into service in June 1935, a decision on the result of the trials of the modified SU-14. Trials for the SU-14-1 proved to have unexpected results: a total of 167 various defects were discovered. While the engineer team was ordered to fix the issues of the SU-14-1, a decision was made to install a superior weapon, the 152 mm naval gun B-30 on the original SU-14. This gun was installed in 1937 and gunnery trials were conducted in September of the same year. However, in the Red Army's Artillery Directorate wrote in 1936 that the SU-14-1 could not be accepted for military trials, let alone mass production, one of the reasons being the slow rate of fire of only one shot per 5-7 minutes due to issues with the gun. Furthermore, Chief Designer P. N. Siachyntov was arrested on December 31, 1936, due to most of his projects being rejected for mass-production, thus halting further development of the SU-14 in 1937. However, the SU-14 was only formally cancelled in August 1938.

Both SU-14s remained at the Artillery Directorate's Scientific Research Artillery Proving Grounds. In 1940, the Committee of Defense ordered factory #185 to equip the two SU-14s with full armor and the 152 mm M1935 (Br-2) gun, serving as bunker busters in Finland. The requirements changed, as the SU-14 already had the 152mm naval gun (B-30) so there was no need to change it. As a result, factory #185 received only one Br-2 gun. Since the SU-14 and SU-14-1 chassis were somewhat different, the conversions were also different. Nevertheless, the overall concept was the same, the vehicles would fire directly from a range of 1500-2000 m, the front armor was increased to 50 mm, the sides were 30 mm thick (60 mm in the front section), and the rear was 20 mm thick. There were also several changes for the fighting compartment, which was rearranged, making room for 28 rounds of ammunition, a TK-3 radio set and TPU-2 intercom, while providing ample room for the 6-man crew operating the guns. For defense, 4 DT machine guns were carried inside the vehicles with 5 mounts for them, and one P-40 AA mount on the roof. Due to delays in the supply of the armor plates to factory #185, both would arrive too late to serve in the Winter War.

With the start of Operation Barbarossa, as the German forces approached Moscow and the Kubinka proving grounds, the two SU-14 and T-100Y prototypes were shipped to Kazan in the fall of 1941, where they served as specimens in technical courses, returning to Kubinka in 1943. The first prototype, as SU-14, was scrapped in 1960. The second prototype, as SU-14-1, is on display together with the T-100Y, since 1945 renamed SU-100Y, at the area #1 of the Patriot Park in Kubinka.

== Gallery ==
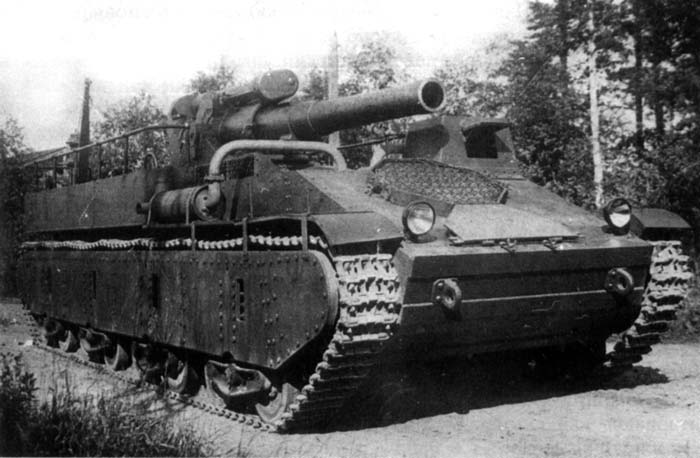
SU-14 before the firing test, 1934

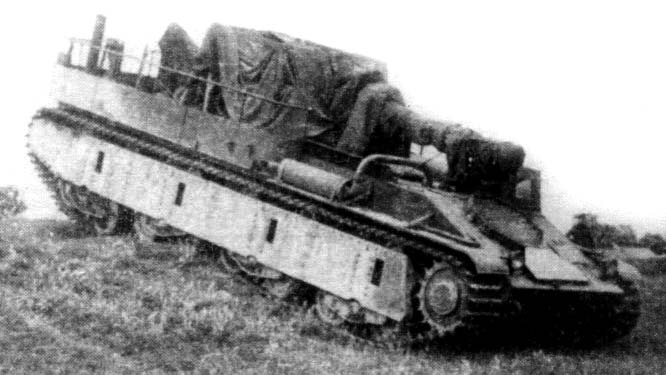
SU-14 with gun covered, in trial for navigation, 1934

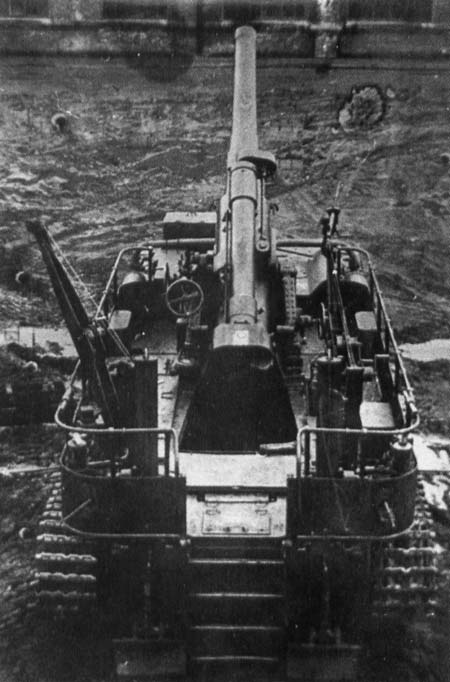
SU-14 in the courtyard of the factory No 185, 1934

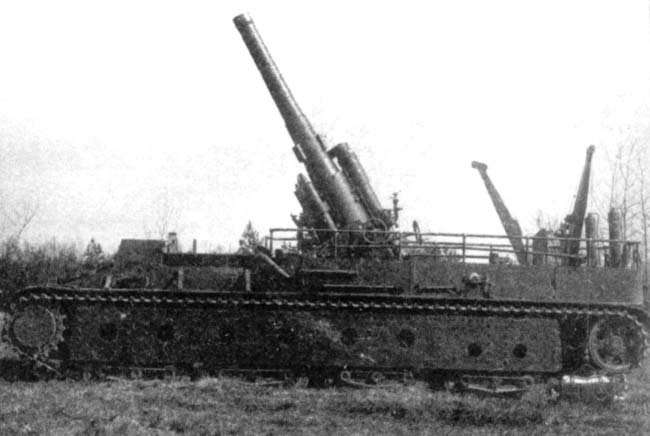
Prototype of SU-14-1 in trial, 1936

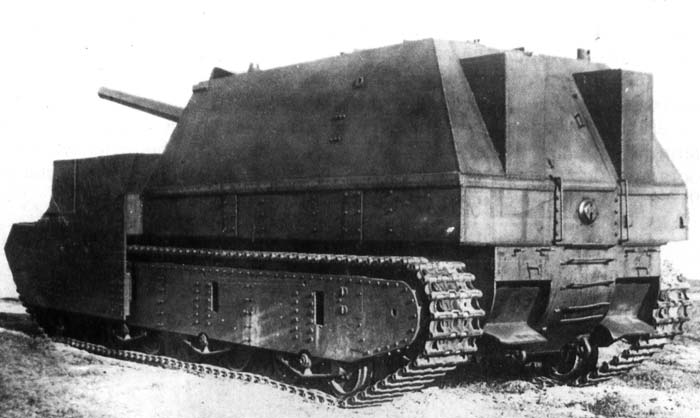
Enhanced armored SU-14 in trial at Kubinka, 1940

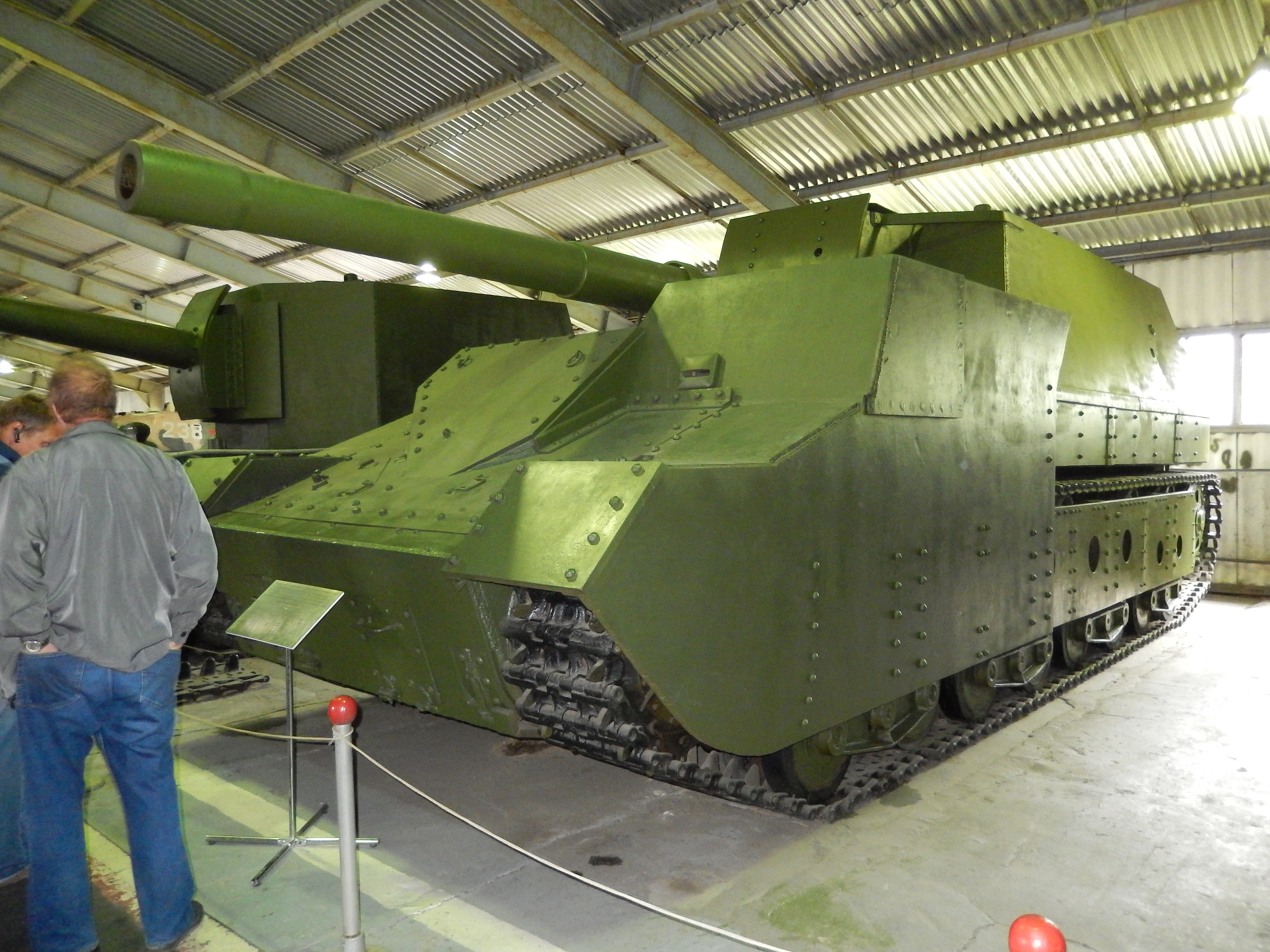
Self-propelled gun SU-14-1 armored museum in Kubinka 01

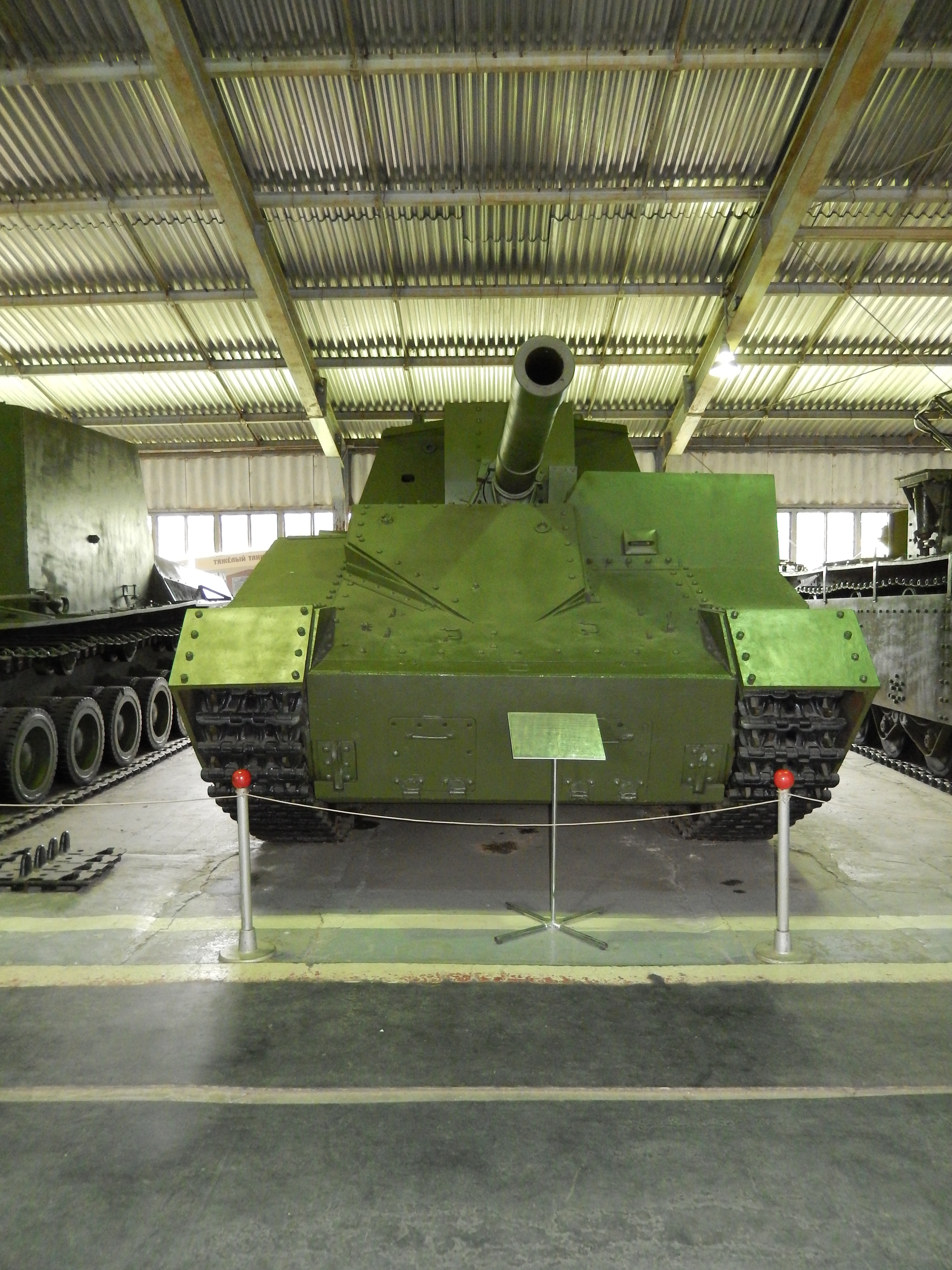
Self-propelled gun SU-14-1 armored museum in Kubinka 02

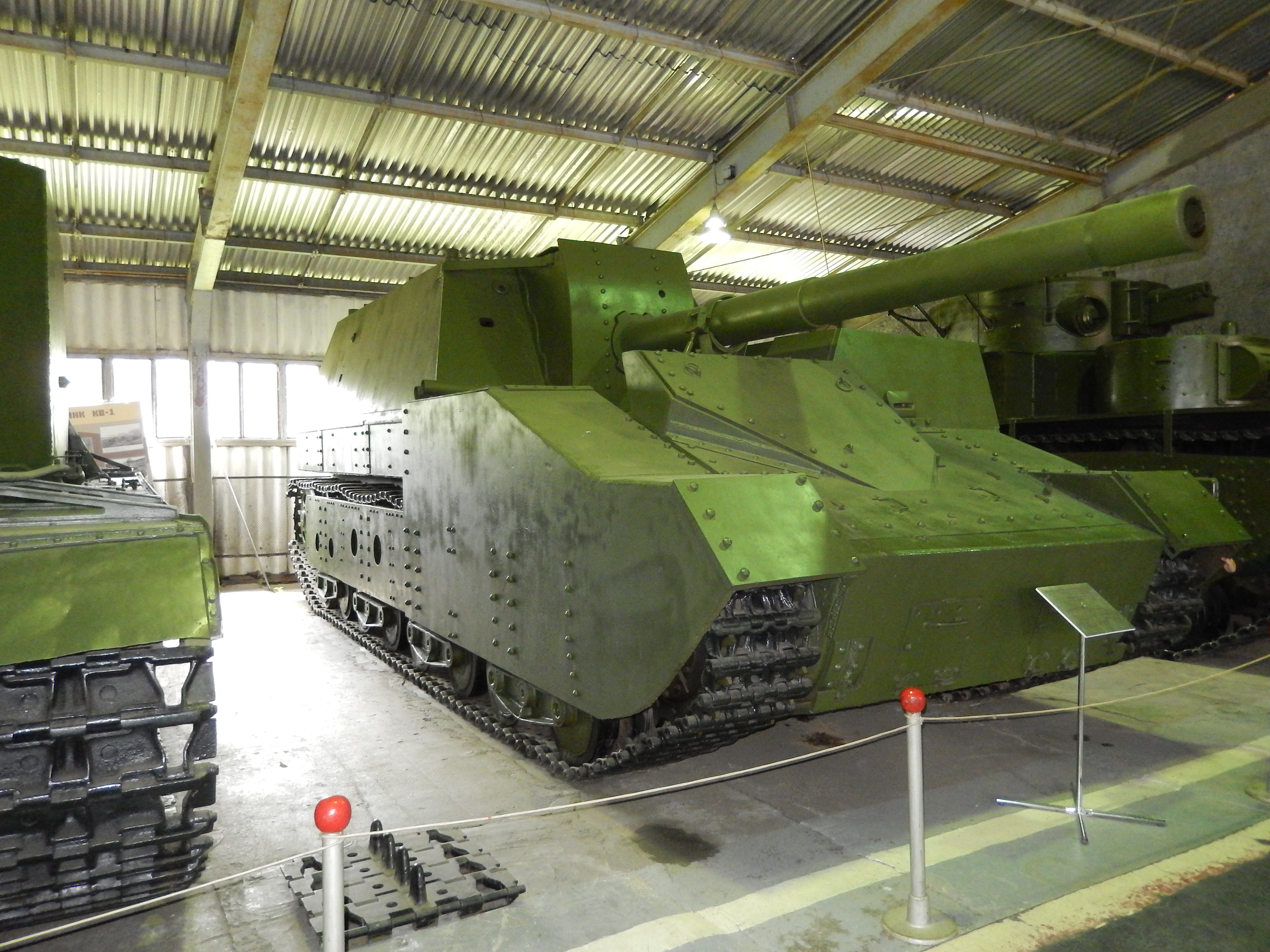
Self-propelled gun SU-14-1 armored museum in Kubinka 03

== Sources ==
CAMD RF 38-11355-10
"The SU-14 is a Massive Soviet SPG from the 1930s". Tank Historia. December 28, 2022.
Pasholok, Yuri (December 31, 2021). "A Second Life for Obsolete Chassis". Tankarchives.ca.
