= 280 mm mortar M1939 (Br-5) =

280 mm M1939 (Br-5)
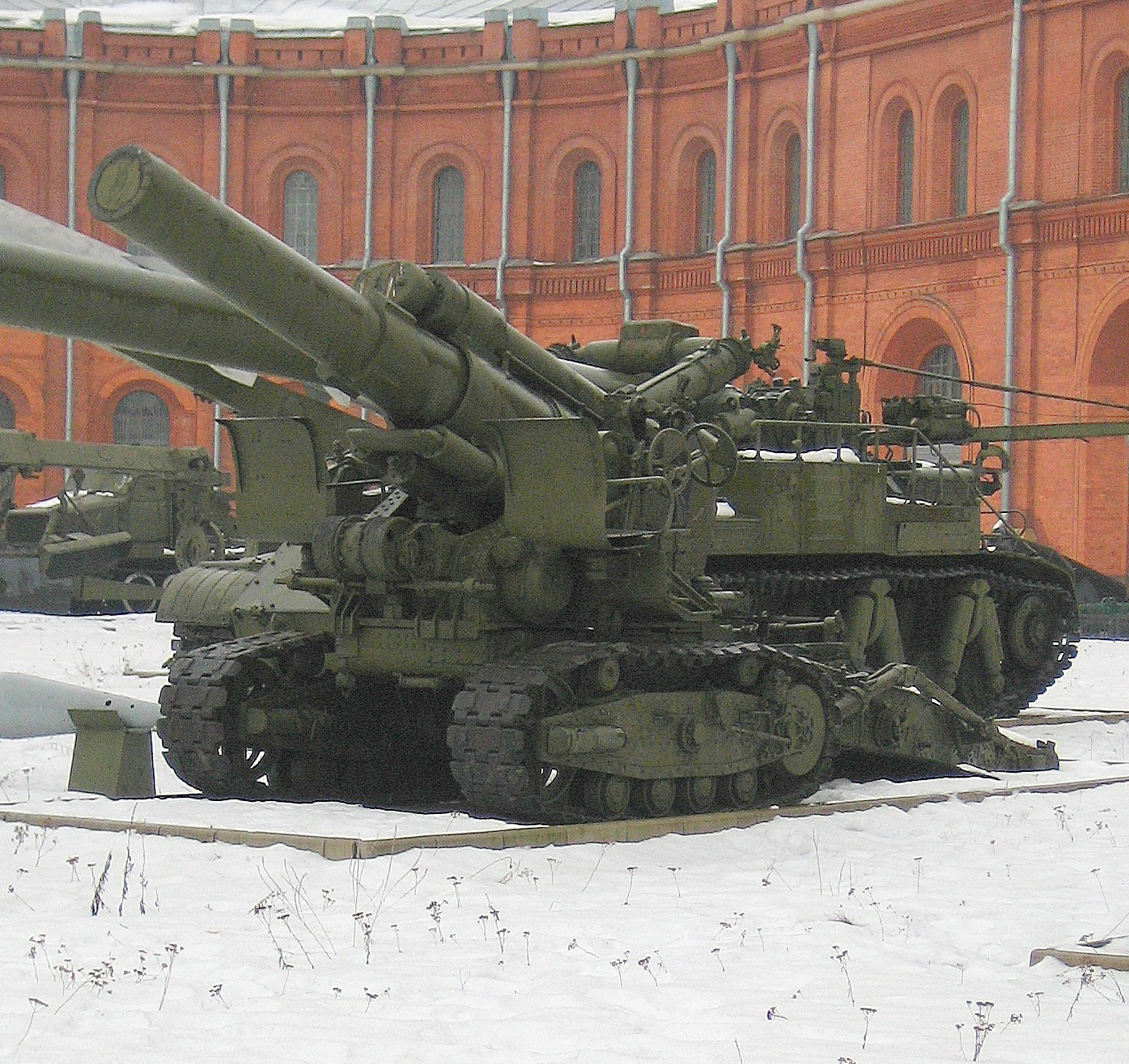
- Br-5 in Saint Petersburg Artillery Museum.
- Type: Heavy mortar
- Place of origin: Soviet Union

Service history
- In service: 1939–1970s
- Used by: Soviet Union
- Wars: World War II

Production history
- Designer: Barrikady
- Manufacturer: Barrikady
- Produced: 1939–1940
- No. built: 47

Specifications
- Mass: combat: 18,400 kg (40,600 lb) travel: 19,700 kg (43,400 lb)
- Barrel length: bore: 3.975 m (13 ft 0.5 in) L/14.2 overall: 4.75 m (15 ft 7 in) L/17
- Crew: 15
- Shell: 246 kg (542 lb)
- Caliber: 279.4 mm (11 in)
- Elevation: 0 to 60 degrees
- Traverse: 8 degrees
- Rate of fire: 1 round every 4 minutes
- Muzzle velocity: 356 m/s (1,170 ft/s)
- Effective firing range: 10,410 m (11,380 yd)

The 280 mm mortar M1939 (Br-5) (Russian: 280-мм мортира образца 1939 года (Бр-5)) was a Soviet heavy artillery piece used during World War II, it was the Red Army's heaviest field piece during the war.

== Design ==
The Br-5 mortar was a 279.4 mm (11 in) calibre towed mortar with a barrel 14.2 calibres long. The Br-5 mortar shared the same tracked, box trail carriage as the 152 mm gun M1935 (Br-2) and the 203 mm howitzer M1931 (B-4). The carriage allowed transportation of the weapon over short distances with the speed of 5–8 km/h (3–5 mph), for longer distances the barrel was removed from the carriage and transported separately on a special wheeled cart, the Br-10, a speed of 25 km/h (16 mph) was possible with the barrel removed.

For transport the Voroshilovets artillery tractor was used to haul the Br-5 gun carriage, whilst the less powerful Komintern artillery tractor was employed to pull the Br-10 cart and barrel.

== Development ==
By the 1930s the Red Army's siege artillery consisted of obsolete stocks of 280 mm Schneider M1914/15's (25 pieces) and 305 mm howitzer M1915's (31 pieces), both inherited from the Imperial Russian Army. The aging guns and their insufficient numbers (the M1914/15 at less than half of what was mandated in the 1941 mobilization plans, 66 pieces) meant that new models were required, including 280mm-caliber ones. The calibre was chosen as 280mm because of the available stocks of 280 mm Schneider M1914/15 ammunition. With the development the 203 mm B-4 already approved for service, and the design work for the 152 mm Br-2 underway, it was decided to adopt the very same carriage for the new siege mortar, creating a "triplex", simplifying production and operation.

Both the Bolshevik factory of Leningrad and the Barrikady factory of Stalingrad were tasked to submit competing designs, the Bolshevik design by Kurpchatnikov being named the B-33, the Barrikady design by Ilya Ivanov the Br-5.

The B-33 had its barrel built in 1935, and was sent for factory testing on February 1, 1936. The B-33 featured a fastened barrel, casing and breech, as well as a piston bolt from the Schneider mortar. The barrel was mounted directly atop the carriage without any counterweight balancing, as a loaded breech would suffice in balancing the weight. The B-33, having completed factory testing, was sent to field tests on April 17, 1936, which completed successfully. The B-33 was subsequently recommended to have its identified defects fixed before being sent to military tests.

The Br-5 went to factory testing in December, 1936, and field tests in April, 1937, which it failed. However, despite the B-33 showing better shell grouping, higher rate of fire and smaller dimensions, the Br-5 was accepted into service as the 280 mm mortar model 1939, with the first order for production being issued before field tests ended. The reason why the Br-5 was chosen instead of the B-33 was unknown, but may have emerged from the voluntarist nature of the Br-5. The prototype B-33 was sent to Barrikady for studying in March 1939.

== Production ==
The first order for eight pieces was placed with the Barrikady factory in May 1937, although this was subsequently reduced to two in recognition of the immaturity of the system. Development of the system continued throughout 1938 and in 1939 the first 20 pieces were produced, with an additional 25 pieces following in 1940.

== Service ==
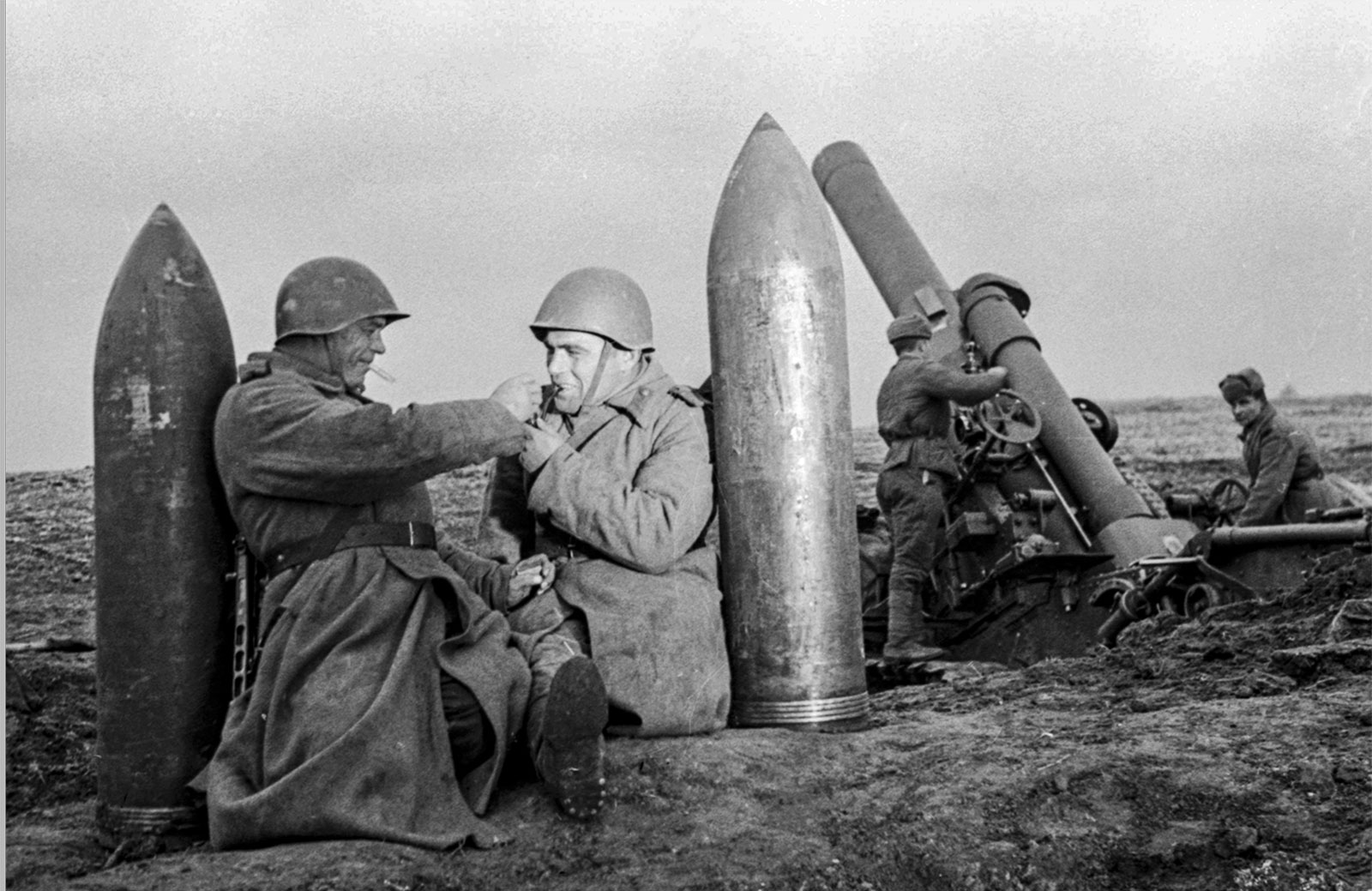
Br-5 mortar crewmen taking a smoke break between shells

In Red Army service the Br-5 mortars were intended for the destruction of particularly strong concrete, reinforced concrete or armoured structures.

The Br-5 mortar's combat debut occurred in Finland during the Winter War in November 1939. Four Br-5 mortars were deployed to Finland with the 40th Separate Artillery Battalion, where they were used to destroy heavily armoured bunkers and pillboxes during the battles along the Mannerheim Line. Br-5 mortars fired a total of 414 shells during the Winter War, the extraordinary defences faced can be seen in the assault on Pillbox #0031, which fell only after 116 Br-5 mortar shells as well as 1,043 203 mm B-4 howitzer shells were fired at it from point blank range. Pillbox #0011 continued to resist after a combined 203 mm and 280 mm onslaught of 1,322 shells were fired at it.

Information about the employment of the Br-5 mortar during the Great Patriotic War is scarce; their deployment was heavily classified as it was generally indicative of a major attack. In service they were organised into howitzer battalions of six mortars, each battalion consisting of three batteries each with two mortars. Between 1941 and 1945 the Red Army had eight such battalions, armed with both the Br-5 and the old 280 mm Schneider M1914/15. Nine pieces were lost in the fighting of 1941.

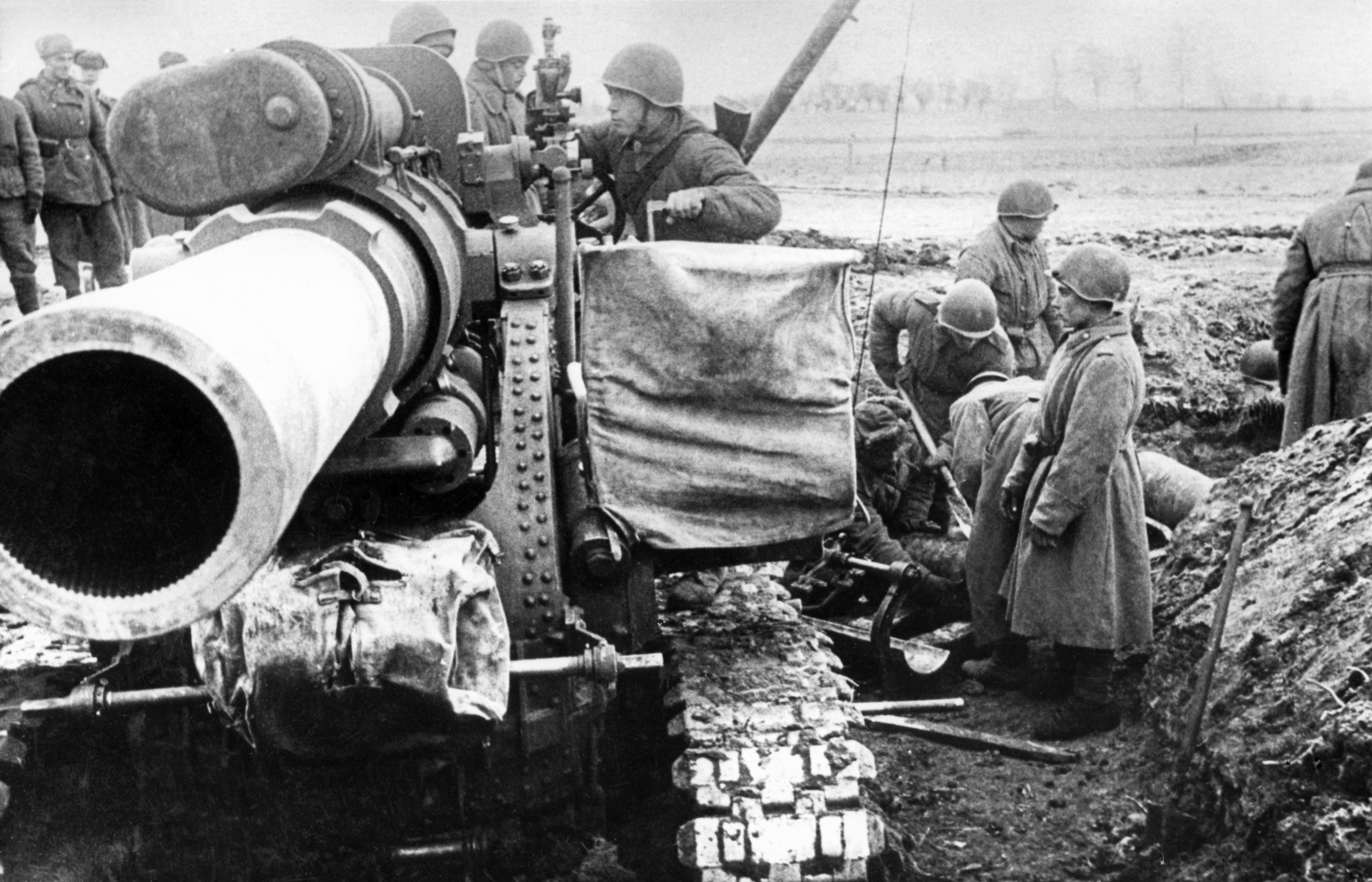
A Br-5 mortar and crew in East Prussia, November 1944

Reference has been made to the use of the Br-5 mortar by the 1st Belorussian Front in the Battle of Poznań in January and February 1945. It was employed during the storming of Küstrin in March and the Battle of Königsberg in April and it was the heaviest field artillery piece used by the Red Army during the Battle of Berlin.

As with the 152 mm gun M1935 (Br-2) and the 203 mm howitzer M1931 (B-4), the biggest drawback with the Br-5 mortar was the carriage. Intended to provide improved mobility, the tracked carriage was much too heavy and proved to be quite cumbersome, actually reducing mobility. Additionally the separate transportation of the barrel greatly increased the time taken to bring the weapon into action – it took between 45 minutes to two hours depending on the weather to bring to category combat from the travelling configuration. Further, the limited traverse of the ordnance on the mount, 8 degrees, could result in significant time delays, as it took at least 25 minutes to manoeuvre the weapon beyond the 8 degrees.

After World War II the Br-5 was to remain in Soviet service until the 1970s. In 1955 the Br-5 (along with the B-4 and Br-2) was modernised with a new wheeled carriage that greatly increased mobility, could transport the weapon in one piece and which allowed the weapons to be towed at up to 35 km/h (22 mph), these upgraded pieces were designated Br-5M.

== Ammunition ==
The Br-5 fired bag charge ammunition with three natures of high-explosive and one of anti-concrete. The high-explosive shells were all remaining pre-revolution stocks of 280 mm Schneider M1914/15 ammunition, whilst the anti-concrete was created for the Br-5.

The Br-5 mortar offered little improvement in ballistic performance over the 280 mm Schneider M1914/15.

Ammunition natures.
| Type | Model | Weight | HE weight | Muzzle velocity | Range |
| HE | F-674 | 286.7 kg (632 lb) | 58.7 kg (129 lb) | 290 m/s (950 ft/s) | 7,350 m (8,040 yd) |
| HE | F-674F | 204 kg (450 lb) | 45 kg (99 lb) | 360 m/s (1,200 ft/s) | 9,350 m (10,230 yd) |
| HE | F-674K | 200.7 kg (442 lb) | 33.6 kg (74 lb) | 420 m/s (1,400 ft/s) | 10,950 m (11,980 yd) |
| Anti-concrete | G-675 | 246 kg (542 lb) | 44.8 kg (99 lb) | 356 m/s (1,170 ft/s) | 10,410 m (11,380 yd) |

== Surviving examples ==
A Br-5 mortar on the original tracked carriage is kept at the Military Historical Museum of Artillery, Engineers and Signal Corps in Saint Petersburg.
