= Vecherniy Bishkek =

Newspaper in Bishkek, Kyrgyzstan

- Type: Daily newspaper
- Format: Online
- Owner: Alexander Kim
- Founded: 1 January 1974; 51 years ago
- Political alignment: Independent
- Language: Russian
- Headquarters: Bishkek
- Website: www.vb.kg

Vecherniy Bishkek (Russian: Вечерний Бишкек; Kyrgyz: Кечки Бишкек, The Evening Bishkek) is a daily Russian language newspaper published in Kyrgyzstan. Founded in 1974, it was known as Vecherniy Frunze since 1991. It was established as a newspaper of Frunze City Committee of the Communist Party of Kirghizia.

Vecherniy Bishkek is edited by Gennadiy Kuz'min, and Internet edition by Dina Maslova. The owner of the paper is Alexander Kim who also owns Agym newspaper.

== See also ==
- List of newspapers in Kyrgyzstan
