= List of newspapers in Kyrgyzstan =

This is a list of newspapers in Kyrgyzstan.

According to the International Research & Exchanges Board there are "159 active print media outlets" in Kyrgyzstan.

- Russian language
  - Delo №
  - Moya Stolitsa Novosti
  - Obschestvennyi reyting
  - Slovo Kyrgyzstana
  - Vecherniy Bishkek
- Kyrgyz language
  - Aalam
  - Achyk Sayasat
  - Agym
  - Alibi
  - Asaba
  - Azat.kg
  - De facto
  - Dlya Vas
  - Erkin Too
  - Fabula
  - Kerben
  - Kerege
  - Kok Asaba
  - Kun Darek
  - Kyrgyz tuusu
  - Litsa
  - Mankurt Zholu
  - Maydan
  - Ordo
  - PolitKlinika
  - Press.kg
  - Respublika
  - Super-info
  - Uchur
  - Zaman Kyrgyzstan
  - Zhany Agym
  - Zhany Ordo
- Dungan language
  - Huimin bao
- English language
  - Bishkek Observer
  - Kyrgyzstan Chronicle
  - The Times of Central Asia
