= Kyrgyz tuusu =

Oldest Kyrgyz language newspaper in Kyrgyzstan

- Type: Daily newspaper
- Format: Print, online
- Founder: Government of Kyrgyz Republic
- Editor-in-chief: A.Matisakov
- Founded: November 7, 1924
- Language: Kyrgyz
- Headquarters: Bishkek
- Circulation: 20000
- Website: kyrgyztuusu.kg

Kyrgyz tuusu (Kyrgyz: Кыргыз туусу) is the oldest Kyrgyz language newspaper in Kyrgyzstan. It was first published as Erkin Too in Tashkent on November 7, 1924. From August 1927 it was known as Kyzyl Kyrgyzstan (Red Kyrgyzstan), and from 1956 - Sovettik Kyrgyzstan (Soviet Kyrgyzstan). The newspaper received its current name in 1991.

== See also ==
- List of newspapers in Kyrgyzstan
