= 210 mm gun M1939 (Br-17) =

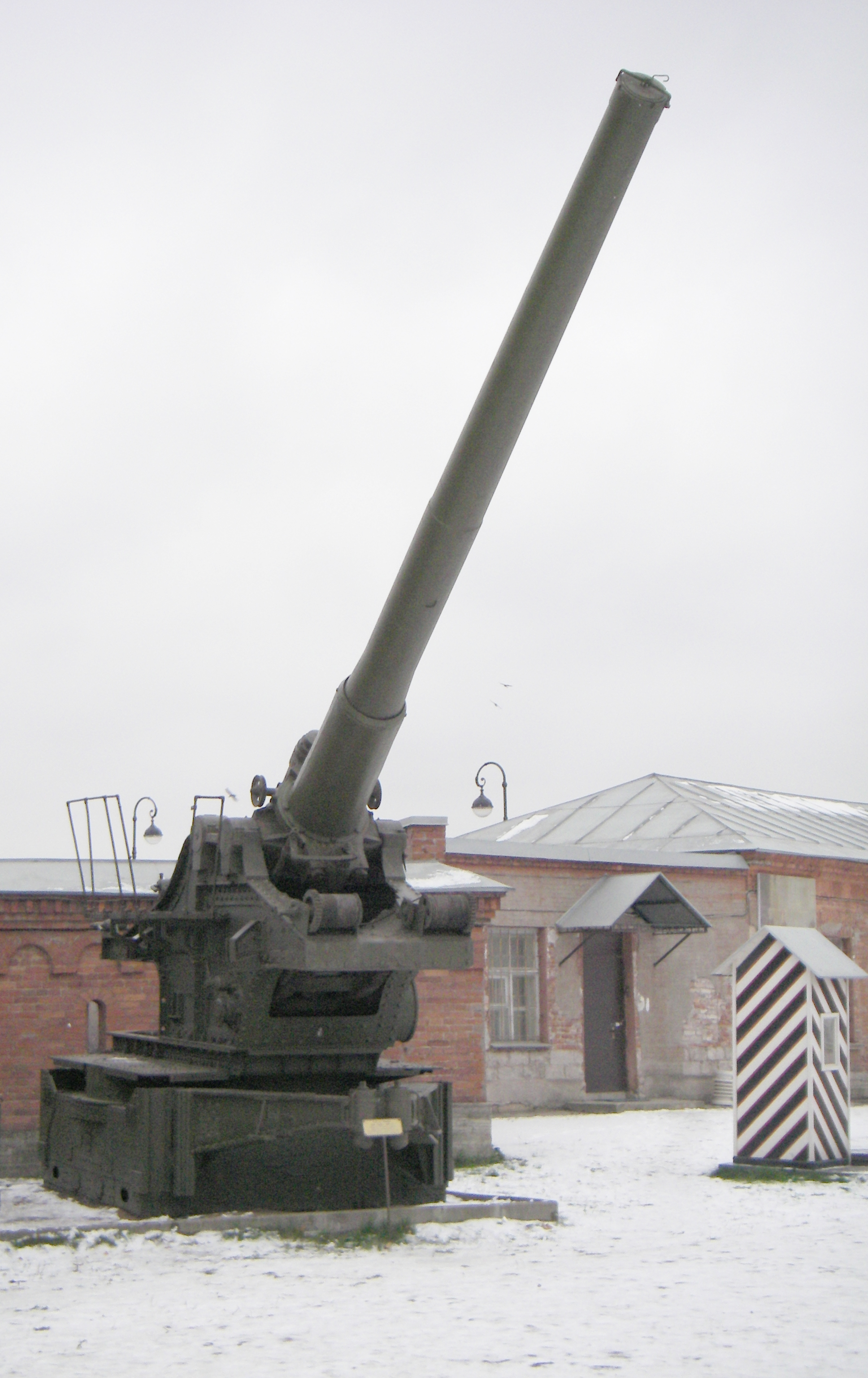
- Br-17 in Saint Petersburg Artillery Museum.
- Type: Heavy siege gun
- Place of origin: Czechoslovakia

Service history
- Used by: Soviet Union
- Wars: World War II

Production history
- Designer: Škoda
- Manufacturer: Škoda
- Produced: 1940−1941

Specifications
- Mass: 43,218 kg (95,279 lb)
- Barrel length: 10.058 m (30 ft)
- Shell: 134.8 kg (297 lb)
- Caliber: 210 millimetres (8.3 in)
- Elevation: -6° to +50°
- Traverse: 22°
- Rate of fire: 1 round per 3 minutes
- Muzzle velocity: 800 m/s (2,600 ft/s)
- Maximum firing range: 29.36 km (18.24 mi)

The 210 mm gun M1939 (Br-17) (Russian: 210-мм пушка образца 1939 года (Бр-17)) was a Czechoslovak heavy siege gun used by the Soviet Union during World War II. After the Germans occupied Czechoslovakia in March 1939 they took over the Škoda Works, which had been working on this design and a companion 305 mm howitzer. As a result of the Molotov–Ribbentrop Pact the Germans sold both designs to the Soviet Union. It is not entirely clear that Škoda actually built the weapons itself or merely supplied the blueprints.

The Br-17 could be broken down into three loads for transport and it used the same carriage, firing platform and control mechanism as the 305 mm howitzer M1939 (Br-18). By 1941, three Br-17's were in Soviet service, and this number increased to nine by 22 June 1941, when production ceased. These guns were operated by the Soviet army, spread in four artillery regiments together with Br-2 guns. Each regimental battery consisted of six 152 mm Br-2 guns and two Br-17's. The Germans assigned the Br-17 a designation of K 251(r), but there is no record of the Germans capturing any during Operation Barbarossa. Firing 133 kg 53-F-643 high-explosive shells, the Br-17 had a range of up to 28.65 km.
