= S-51 Self-Propelled Gun =

Experimental Soviet artillery unit

S-51
- Type: Self-propelled gun
- Place of origin: Soviet Union

Production history
- Designer: TsAKB
- Designed: 1943
- Manufacturer: TsAKB
- Produced: 1943
- No. built: 1

Specifications
- Mass: 49.7 t (110,000 lb)
- Length: 9.35 m (30 ft 8 in)
- Width: 3.35 m (11 ft 0 in)
- Height: 3.40 m (11 ft 2 in)
- Crew: 9
- Armor: 75mm front 60mm side 30mm rear
- Main armament: 1x 203 mm howitzer M1931 (B-4)
- Engine: V-2K 12 cylinder diesel engine 600hp
- Transmission: mechanical 8-speed gearbox
- Suspension: torsion bar
- Maximum speed: 35 km/h (22 mph)

The S-51 is an experimental Soviet heavy self-propelled artillery unit from the Great Patriotic War. This combat vehicle was developed in autumn 1943, on the basis of the KV-1S heavy tank by the Central Artillery Design Bureau (TsAKB), under the leadership of Vasily Gavrilovich Grabin.

== History ==
At the end of 1942, the Red Army switched from defensive to offensive operations, which revealed the need for self-propelled artillery. The firepower of towed and self-propelled artillery of 152.4mm caliber was sometimes not enough against pillboxes and fortified buildings in urban battles. To solve this issue, the Red Army was armed with the towed 203 mm howitzer M1931 (B-4). However, the 203 mm howitzer was exposed and unarmored, making attacking risky. In addition, it had a low speed which made swift breakthrough of enemy lines impossible.

Therefore, the Red Army initiated a project for a heavy self-propelled gun. Plant No. 100, CB Uralmash, and TsAKB took part in this competition. Plant No. 100 under the leadership of Josef Yakovlevich Kotin created a self-propelled gun carriage that looked similar to the Canon de 194 mle GPF. The design by CB Uralmash was two 152mm howitzers on two connected SU-122 chassis.

In the autumn of 1943, the TsAKB designed and built a self-propelled gun on the basis of the KV-1S equipped with the 203mm howitzer. The self-propelled gun received the designation, S-51.

== Description ==
=== Hull ===
The S-51 had a very long hull and an open topped fighting compartment. The front, side and rear of the hull had 75 mm, 60mm and 30 mm of armour respectively. The hull had a driver's compartment and could seat one out of the 10 crews required, with the engine and transmission being located in the rear of the hull. The hull also had a bottom hatch for emergency escape and a number of small hatches for access to the other modules of the vehicle.

=== Armament ===
The S-51 was armed with a modified 203 mm howitzer M1931 (B-4). The gun was mounted at the front of the vehicle with gun shields. The elevation of the gun was 0 to +60 degrees, and the gun traverse being 4 degrees to either side. The vehicle had 12 rounds of ammunition that could be HE and/or armour piercing shells. The shells and propellant charges were placed behind the gun shields of the vehicle.

During transport, the gun shields were let down and the barrel of the howitzer was turned to the center of the hull.

=== Engine ===
The S-51 was powered by a four-stroke V-shaped 12-cylinder diesel engine V-2K. The engine produced 600 hp allowing the vehicle to travel at 35 km/h. The engine was started by a starter ST-700 with a capacity of 15 liters. Fuel tanks with a volume of 600-615 liters were located inside the hull.

=== Transmission ===
Self-propelled artillery mount S-51 was equipped with a mechanical transmission. Unreliable operation of the transmission group was noted during its testing. This fact served as further confirmation of the thesis that transmission defects were one of the most significant shortcomings of the KV series tanks and vehicles based on it.

=== Chassis ===
The chassis of the S-51 was identical to that of the KV-1S tank. It had 1 drive wheel, 1 rear wheel, 3 support rollers and 6 roadwheels on each side.

== Development ==
In February 1944, the S-51 underwent factory testing. It was transferred to the artillery testing ground before completing the factory tests due to the great interest in the heavy self-propelled gun project.

However, many flaws in the S-51 were discovered during the trials. When the gun was elevated to a high angle and fired, the gun would sway and the recoil would push the tank back. When the gun was elevated at a low angle and fired, the recoil would be so strong that the crew would fall over, which could be deadly in battle. Overall, it was deemed that the KV-1S chassis was unsuitable for conversions into SPGs.

Due to these problems, the S-51 did not enter mass production.
