= 305 mm howitzer M1939 (Br-18) =

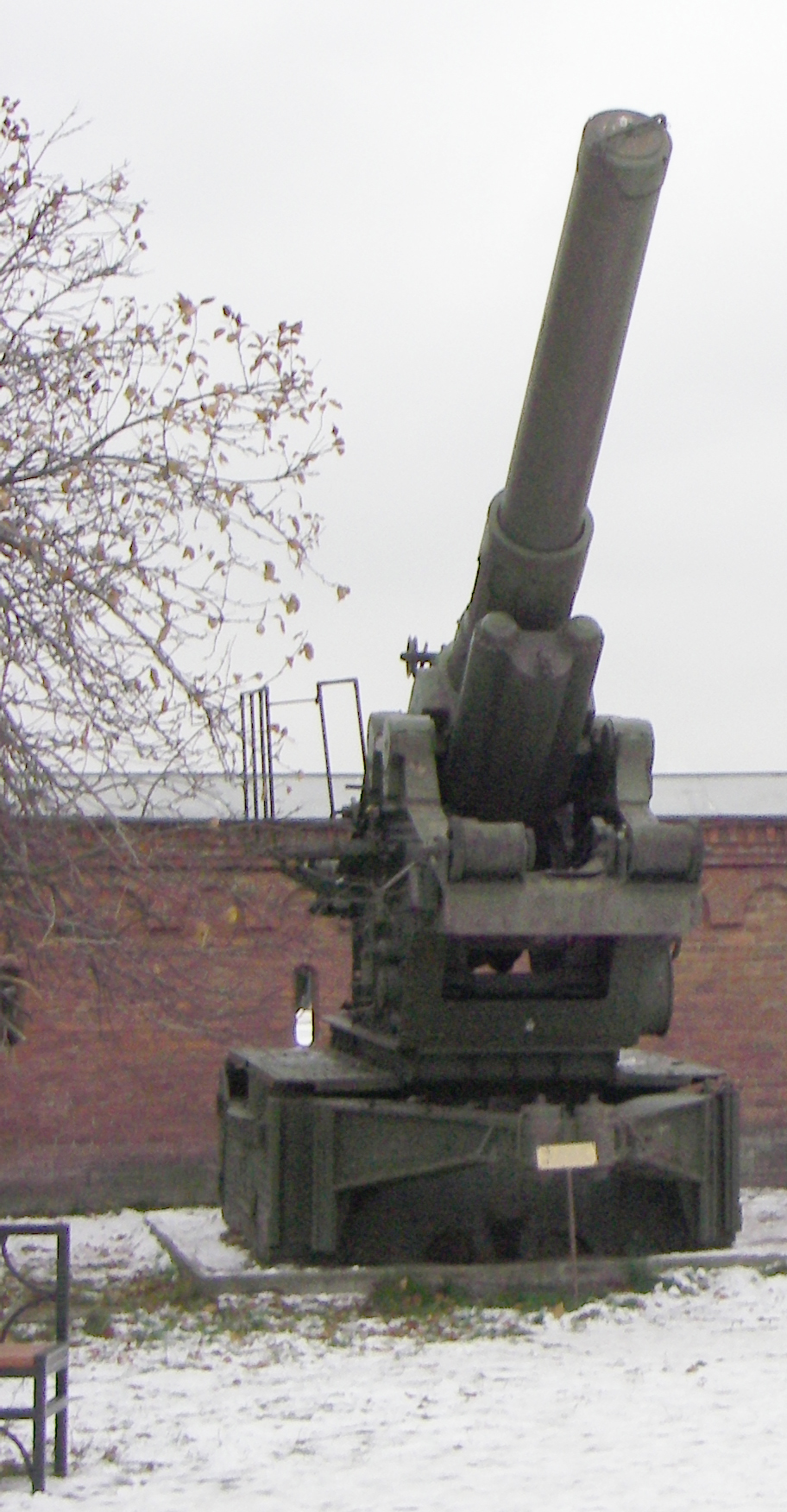
- Br-18 in Saint Petersburg Artillery Museum.
- Type: Superheavy siege howitzer
- Place of origin: Soviet Union

Service history
- Used by: Soviet Union
- Wars: World War II

Production history
- Designer: Škoda
- Manufacturer: Škoda
- Produced: 1940
- No. built: 3

Specifications
- Mass: 45.7 t (101,000 lb)
- Barrel length: 6,705.6 mm (264.00 in)
- Caliber: 305 mm (12.0 in)
- Elevation: 70 degrees
- Traverse: 90 degrees
- Rate of fire: 1 rounds per 3 minutes
- Muzzle velocity: 450 metres per second (1,500 ft/s)
- Maximum firing range: 16,580 m (54,400 ft)

The 305 mm howitzer M1939 (Br-18) (Russian: 305-мм гаубица образца 1939 года (Бр-18)) was a Soviet superheavy siege howitzer used by the Soviet Union during World War II. After the Germans occupied Czechoslovakia in March 1939 they took over the Škoda Works, which had been working on this (Skoda XV) design and a companion 210 mm gun (Skoda VX). After a successful test firing 5 July 1939, as a result of the Molotov–Ribbentrop Pact the Germans sold both designs to the Soviet Union. It is not entirely clear that Skoda actually built the weapons itself or merely supplied the blueprints. At any rate, very few weapons seem to have been built; so few, in fact, that there is no record of the Germans capturing any during Operation Barbarossa.

It used the same carriage as 210 mm gun M1939 (Br-17) as well as the same firing platform and control mechanism. It was transported in three loads.

It was most famously used to defend Leningrad during the siege of Leningrad. The Soviet troops learned that if they fired all of them at the same time and used high-explosive shells, when the rounds exploded at the same time, they would flip over advancing German tanks.

The 305mm would also later appear in the siege of Königsberg (present day Kaliningrad).
