= Agym =

Biweekly newspaper in Kyrgyzstan

- Type: Biweekly newspaper
- Owner: Alexander Kim
- Founded: 2001; 25 years ago
- Political alignment: Independent
- Language: Kyrgyz

Agym (Kyrgyz: Stream) is a biweekly newspaper published in Kyrgyzstan. It is privately owned.

== History and profile ==
Agym, a Kyrgyz language biweekly paper, was established in 2001. The paper is published on Fridays. Bakyt Jamalidinov was the publisher at the initial period. Melis Eshimkanov was the owner of the biweekly. He also served as the editor-in-chief of Agym. Then Begaly Nargozuev became the publisher and owner. The paper was sold to Alexander Kim in February 2009.

As of 2007 Agym was an opposition paper in the country. It has an independent political leaning.

In 2009, the approximate circulation of Agym was 10,000 copies. It rose to 15,000 copies in 2011.

== See also ==
- List of newspapers in Kyrgyzstan
