= Titan-Barrikady =

Russian defense manufacturer

Coordinates: 48°46′33″N 44°35′12″E

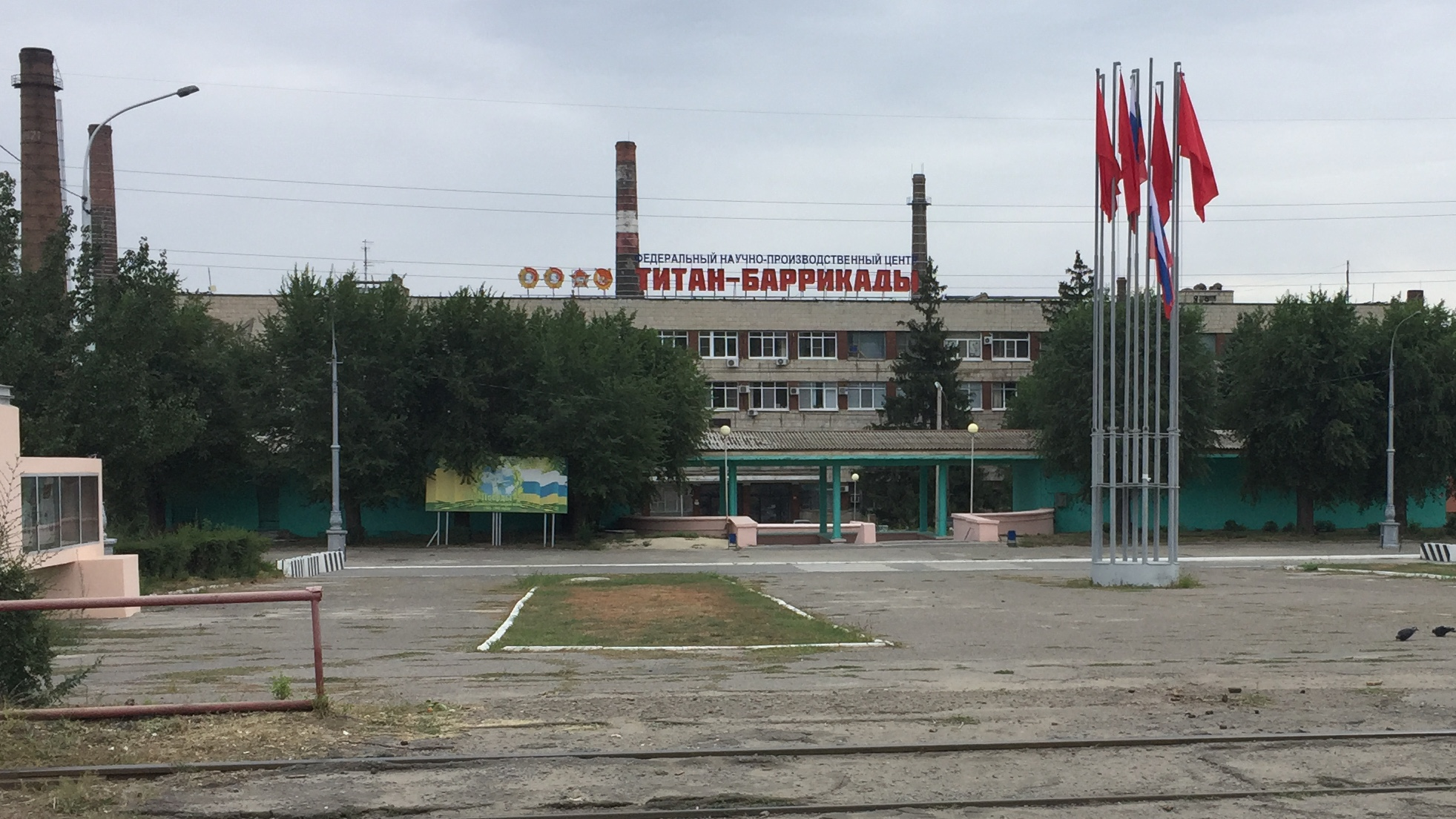
- Titan-Barrikady plant in Volgograd
- Type: Joint-stock company
- Founded: 1914
- Headquarters: Volgograd, Russia
- Products: Artillery, Ballistic missile launchers
- Parent: Moscow Institute of Thermal Technology
- Website: cdbtitan.ru

Titan-Barrikady (Russian: Титан-Баррикады) is a military-industrial company based in Volgograd, Russia. It was formed in 2014, after the merger between the Barrikady Production Association and the Titan Design Bureau. It is a subsidiary of the Moscow Institute of Thermal Technology.

== History ==
The plant was established in 1914 as the Tsaritsyn Weapons Factory, and renamed Red Barricades after the Russian Revolution. It was for a time the largest munition factory in Europe. Titan had its origins as the factory's design bureau.

The factory was overrun and destroyed by the Germans in 1942 during the Battle of Stalingrad, but resumed production in 1944.

In 1975 the plant was selected to manufacture the gun and mount for the 2S7 Pion.

The Titan Design Bureau was separated from the factory in 1990.

In 2014 the Titan Design Bureau and the Barrikady factory were merged again.

The "Joint Stock Company Federal Scientific and Production Center Titan Barrikady" was sanctioned by various countries including the United States (OFAC), EU, UK, Switzerland, Canada, Australia, Japan, and Ukraine, for materially supporting Russia's military.

== Barrikady plant ==
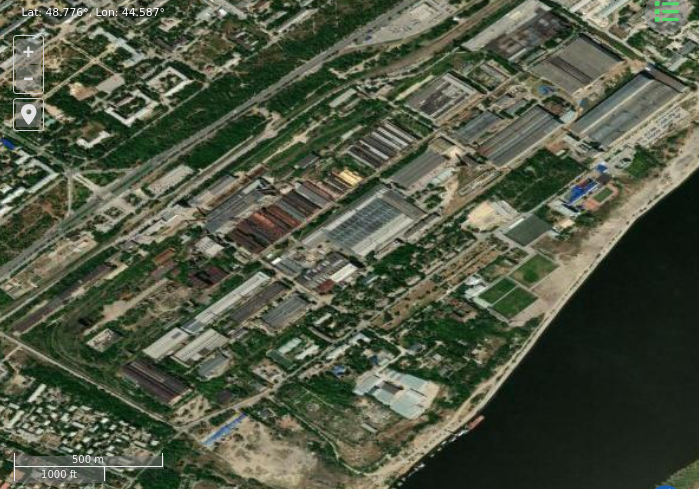
Satellite imagery of Titan-Barrikady plant

Barrikady is a major manufacturer of heavy machinery and large steel castings and forgings. Its manufacturing facilities include the Barrikady Drilling Equipment Plant, one of two large producers of oil drilling rigs in Russia (the other being Uralmash in Yekaterinburg).

Barrikady assembles mobile launchers for ballistic missiles and artillery pieces. Barrikady is located near the large Krasny Oktyabr Steel Plant.

In July 2019, the Barrikady plant assembled a new, fully low floor tram of the model 71-142.

On June 27, 2026, Ukrainian National News reported that FP-5 Flamingo missiles were used in a strike against the plant. OSINT reporters placed three hits on the plant.
