= Olimp Air Flight 4653 =

2015 aviation incident in Kazakhstan

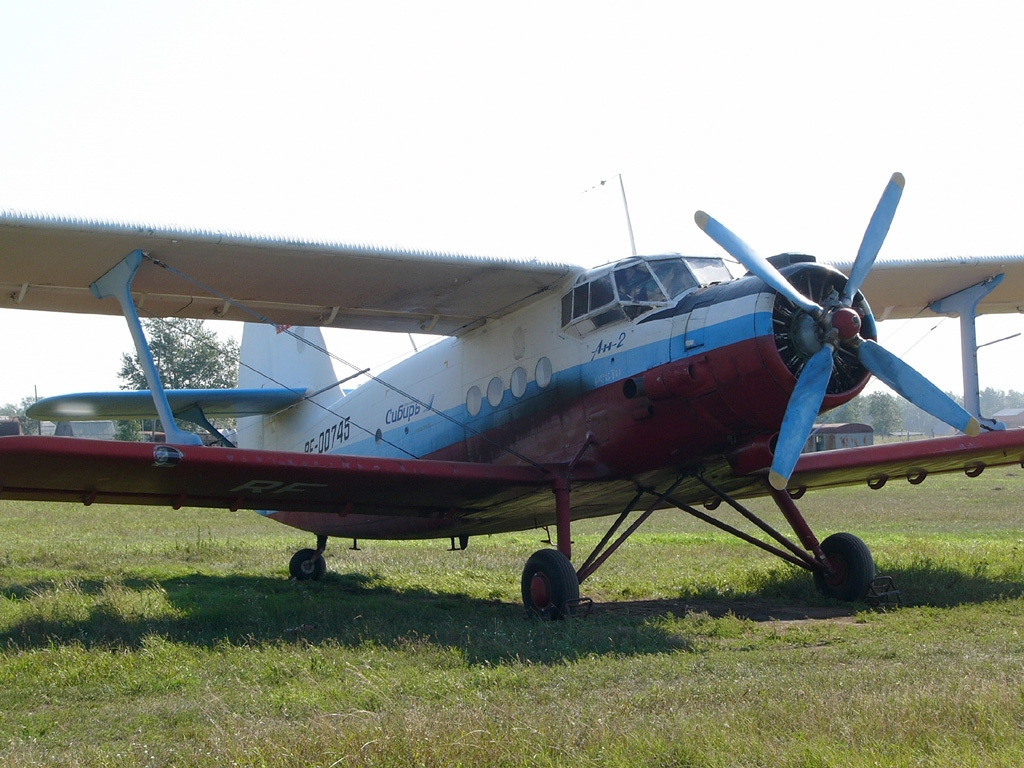
- Antonov An-2P aircraft identical to the one involved

Accident
- Date: 20 January 2015
- Summary: Controlled flight into terrain due to pilot error
- Site: near the Shatyrkul mine, Shu District, Jambyl Region, Kazakhstan; 43°36′13″N 74°17′44″E

Aircraft
- Aircraft type: Antonov An-2P
- Operator: Olimp Air (chartered by Kazakhmys)
- ICAO flight No.: KVK4653 (КЖК4653)
- Call sign: PONTA 4653
- Registration: UP-A0314
- Flight origin: Balkhash Airport, Balkhash, Karaganda Region, Kazakhstan
- 1st stopover: Uzynaral, Kazakhstan
- Last stopover: Aksuyek, Zhambyl Region, Kazakhstan
- Destination: Shatyrkul mine, Shu District, Jambyl Region, Kazakhstan
- Occupants: 7
- Passengers: 4
- Crew: 3
- Fatalities: 6
- Injuries: 1
- Survivors: 1

On 20 January 2015, an Antonov An-2P plane operated by Olimp Air crashed 20 km away from the Shatyrkul mine in the Shu District of Jambyl Region, Kazakhstan. Of the seven people on board, only one survived.

== Aircraft ==
The Antonov An-2P aircraft involved was released by the PZL-Mielec factory in Mielec, Poland on 20 August 1973, with the serial number 1G149-70. It was sold to the Ministry of Civil Aviation of the Soviet Union, which gave it the registration number CCCP-07366, then directing it to the Kazakh Civil Aviation Authority.

Little is known about the plane from 1992 (when the Ministry of Civil Aviation was abolished) to 2002, possibly because the plane wasn't operated in that time. In 2002 the plane was overhauled at the Aktobe Aircraft Repair Plant and had its interior, including seats, updated. It was sold to the Kazakhmys Group afterwards. It used to fly to Balkhash and Sayaq three or four times a month. With the plane operated irregularly, its maintenance was ruled unprofitable and in August 2009 it was sold to a small local airline Olimp Air, based in Karaganda. On 28 August 2009, due to the re-registration of the aircraft, it was given the tail number UP-A0314. Its total operating time amounted to 13,080 hours with the assigned operation time of 20,000 hours.

== Passengers and crew ==
The aircraft was carrying four passengers, all employed by the Kazakhmys Group: director of the Department of Technical Development Gabit Toleubayevich Toleubayev (born 1978), main mechanic at Balkhashtsvetmet Yerbol Beysiyevich Ibrayev (born 1974), director of the Technical and Investment Planning Department at Balkhashtsvetmet Ulbazar Khamitovna Yesmaganbetova (born 1968) and the main geologist at Balkhashtsvetmet Asem Amirkhanovna Shayakhmetova (born 1986).

The aircraft was operated by a flight crew of three: captain Valery Grigoryevich Klyushev (born 1955), first officer Viktor Petrovich Savelyev (born 1954) and flight engineer Vasily Ivanovich Litvinov (born 1951).

== Crash ==
The aircraft was chartered by the Kazakhmys Group and was operating the flight KVK-4653 from Balkhash to the Shatyrkul copper mine with stops in Uzynaral and Aksuyek. Approaching the final destination with weather conditions of low cloud cover and limited visibility, the aircraft started descending and hit the ground 20 km away from the mine, flipping over and getting destroyed.

Of the seven people on board (four passengers and three crew members), six died, with the sole survivor, geologist Asem Shayakhmetova, receiving fractures in the lower extremities. According to Shayakhmetova, she was seated near the exit, and at the time of the crash everyone on the flight was sleeping. When she woke up from the crash, she discovered the bodies of the flight engineer Vasily Litvinov and Gabit Toleubayev. After retrieving a phone from one of the victims and digging her way out through 1 m deep snow, she was able to contact rescuers. She was transported to a hospital in the city of Shu in severe condition before being airlifted to Astana.

== Investigation ==
After the crash, the Transport Prosecutor's Office of Kazakhstan opened a criminal case. A government commission was created to investigate of the crash. Independent experts and representatives of the aircraft plant that produced Antonov An-2 aircraft took part in the investigation.

It was assumed at first that the crash happened while landing in weather conditions of low cloud cover and limited visibility. Other possible causes, such as malfunctioning equipment or pilot errors, were also reviewed.

According to the chairman of the Civil Aviation Committee of the Ministry of Investment and Development of Kazakhstan, Serik Mukhtybayev, the investigation of the crash would last up to three months. According to the investigation, the crash was caused by the failure of the crew to maintain the minimal safe altitude during worsening weather conditions.

== Aftermath ==
According to the Civil Aviation Committee, 115 other An-2 aircraft were operated in Kazakhstan at the time; if necessary, the other aircraft can be examined on whether or not they are airworthy.
