= Nikolai Schipczinsky =

Russian botanist

- Николай Валерианович Шипчинский
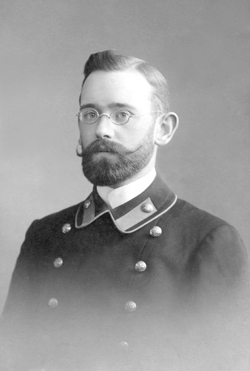
- Born: 1886; Helsinki, Grand Duchy of Finland, Russian Empire
- Died: 1955 (aged 68–69)
- Citizenship: Russian Empire (1886–1917) → RSFSR (1917–1922) → Soviet Union (1922–1955)
- Education: Saint Petersburg State University
- Awards: Medal "For the Defence of Leningrad", Order of the Red Banner of Labour
- Scientific career
- Fields: Botany
- Workplaces: Komarov Botanical Institute, Saint Petersburg Botanical Garden

Nikolai Valerianovich Schipczinsky (Russian: Никола́й Валериа́нович Шипчи́нский; 1886 – 1955) was a Russian and Soviet botanist and taxonomist, who was director of the Saint Petersburg Botanical Garden in 1934-1938 and 1942-1948 respectively.

== Biography ==
Schipczinsky was born in 1886 in Helsinki, Finland, the son of an accountant quartermaster and a housewife.

In 1909 he graduated from the Russian school in Helsinki, and started studying biology at the Physics and Mathematics Faculty of the Saint Petersburg State University. As of 1910, he studied the flora of the Far East in the Herbarium of the Saint Petersburg Botanical Garden under Vladimir Leontyevich Komarov.

He participated in field expeditions to the Trans-Baikal Barguzin district (1912), the South-Ussuri region in the Primorskaya Oblast (1913), the Semipalatinsk Oblast (1914), and Iran (1916). In 1915, he joined the staff of the St. Petersburg Botanical Garden, where he continued to work until his death at first as lecturer (1915), then conservator in the Herbarium (1915-1931), senior botanist for living plants (1931-1933) and director of the Museum (1933-1934). From 1934 on, he was director of the Botanical Garden. In 1939-1941 he was sent to assist in the construction of Balkhash town, where he led the landscaping around the Balkhashtsvetmet copper plant and the city of Balkhash. During World War II, Schipczinsky assisted in the defense of Saint Petersburg by designing a camouflage landscape for the city.

Schipczinsky was involved in the project organization and construction of the Botanical Garden of Moscow (1936-1937), the Botanical Garden of the Belarusian Academy of Sciences in Minsk (1939), and the Botanical Garden of the Kyrgyz SSR.

Herbarium specimens collected by Schipczinsky during his expeditions are preserved in the Herbarium of the Komarov Botanical Institute, and the photo’s he took during these expeditions are kept in the Botanical Museum.

The standard author abbreviation Schipcz. is used to indicate this person as the author when citing a botanical name.
