= Oleg Novachuk =

Kazakhstani businessman (born 1971)

- Born: 9 February 1971 (age 55)
- Education: Kazakh State University
- Occupation: Businessman
- Years active: 1993–present
- Title: CEO, KAZ Minerals PLC
- Term: 2007–present
- Successor: Incumbent

Oleg Novachuk (born 9 February 1971) is a Kazakh businessman, and the chief executive (CEO) of KAZ Minerals.

== Early life ==
He has a master's degree in applied mathematics from Kazakh State University.

== Career ==
Novachuk has been CEO of Kazakhmys since March 2007, having joined the company in 2001 and been finance director from September 2005 to March 2007.

From 1998 to 2001, he was deputy chairman, then chairman, of JSC Kazprombank, which at the time was one of the largest private banks in Kazakhstan.

Following the restructuring of Kazakhmys PLC, Novachuk continued as the CEO of KAZ Minerals PLC.

As of April 2021, he owns 39.4% of KAZ Minerals.
