= Kazakhs in Russia =

Ресейдегі қазақтар
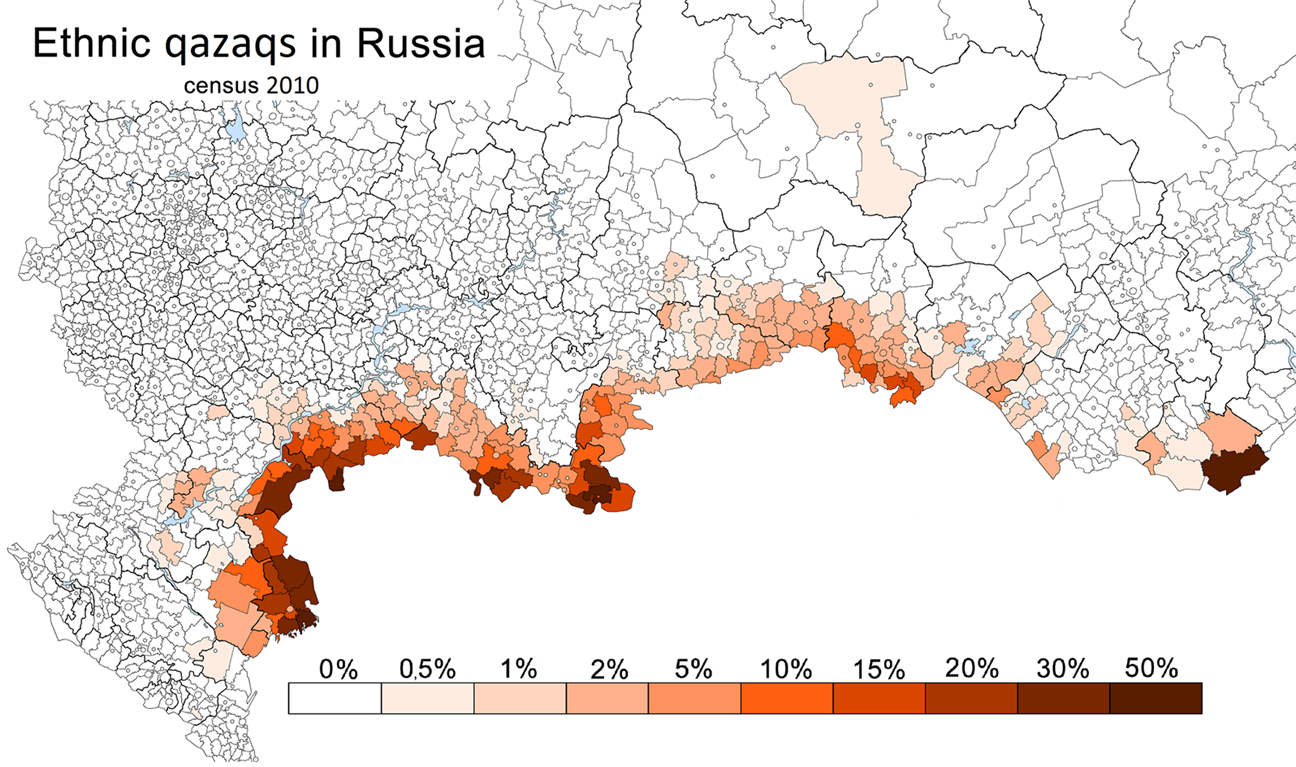
- Distribution of Kazakhs in Russia according to the 2010 census

Total population
- 591,970 (2021 census)

Regions with significant populations
- Russia
- Astrakhan Oblast: 149,415 (2010)
- Orenburg Oblast: 120,262 (2010)
- Omsk Oblast: 78,303 (2010)
- Saratov Oblast: 76,007 (2010)
- Volgograd Oblast: 46,223 (2010)
- Chelyabinsk Oblast: 35,297 (2010)
- Tyumen Oblast: 19,146 (2010)
- Samara Oblast: 15,602 (2010)

Languages
- Kazakh, Russian

Religion
- Sunni Islam

Related ethnic groups
- Kyrgyz, Karakalpaks, Nogais
- 2010 regional data from the 2010 Russian Census.

In Russia, the Kazakh population lives in the regions bordering Kazakhstan. The 2010 Russian census recorded 647,732 Kazakhs living mostly in the Astrakhan Oblast, Volgograd Oblast, Samara Oblast, Orenburg Oblast, Chelyabinsk Oblast, Kurgan Oblast, Tyumen Oblast, Omsk Oblast, Novosibirsk Oblast and Altai Krai regions. During the 1920s significant numbers of Kazakh families were left outside the designated Kazakh Soviet Socialist Republic; after the end of the Soviet Union in 1991, they acquired Russian citizenship and many moved to major Russian cities such as Moscow and St. Petersburg.

== Population ==
Kazakhs are the fourth-largest Turkic ethnic group in Russia, after the Tatars, Bashkirs and Chuvash, and the tenth-largest ethnic group in the country overall.

=== Migration ===
Some Kazakhs in Russia have emigrated to Kazakhstan and other countries, with most out-migration directed towards Kazakhstan. Many have taken part in the country's repatriation programme for ethnic Kazakhs, under which they have been officially recognised as oralmans (since 2019 known as kandas).

There is also migration in the opposite direction, with ethnic Kazakhs from Kazakhstan settling in neighbouring Russian border regions.

According to the Agency of Statistics of the Republic of Kazakhstan, more than 2,000 ethnic Kazakhs emigrated from Kazakhstan in 2008, while over 7,000 oralmans immigrated to the country during the same year.

There has also been a movement of highly skilled Kazakhs from Russian cities to Almaty and Astana, although this trend reportedly declined after 2006 according to data from the Federal State Statistics Service of Russia.

Migration flows between Russia and Kazakhstan became increasingly difficult to measure following the establishment of the Eurasian Economic Community (EurAsEC), which facilitated freedom of movement within the region.

Kazakh population in Russia according to censuses
Census year	Population	% of total population
1939	356,646	0.33
1959	382,431	0.33
1970	477,820	0.37
1979	518,060	0.38
1989	635,865	0.43
2002	653,962	0.45
2010	647,732	0.45
2021	591,970	0.40

According to the 2010 Russian Census, there were 647,732 Kazakhs in the Russian Federation, constituting 0.45% of the country's population. According to the 2002 Russian Census, 72% of Kazakhs in Russia spoke the Kazakh language. More than 90% of rural Kazakhs knew Kazakh, while knowledge of the language was lower among urban Kazakhs. At the same time, 98.3% of Kazakhs in Russia were fluent in the Russian language, partly because Russian is the principal language of education even in localities where Kazakhs form a majority of the population. In a 2003 interview, Kaldarbek Naimanbayev, First Deputy Chairman of the World Association of Kazakhs, claimed that more than one million ethnic Kazakhs lived in Russia and identified insufficient knowledge of the Kazakh language as one of the community's principal problems.

=== Regional distribution ===
According to the 2010 Russian Census, the largest concentrations of Kazakhs in Russia were found in regions bordering Kazakhstan, especially in Astrakhan Oblast, Orenburg Oblast, Omsk Oblast and Saratov Oblast.

Distribution of Kazakhs by region (2010 census)
Region	Population	% of all Kazakhs in Russia	% of regional population
Astrakhan Oblast	149,415	23.07	16.79
Orenburg Oblast	120,262	18.57	5.91
Omsk Oblast	78,303	12.09	3.96
Saratov Oblast	76,007	11.73	3.01
Volgograd Oblast	46,223	7.13	1.77
Chelyabinsk Oblast	35,297	5.45	1.01
Tyumen Oblast	19,146	2.95	0.56
Samara Oblast	15,602	2.41	0.48
Altai Republic	12,524	1.93	6.07
Kurgan Oblast	11,939	1.84	1.31
Novosibirsk Oblast	10,705	1.65	0.40
Moscow	9,393	1.45	0.08
Altai Krai	7,979	1.23	0.33
Republic of Kalmykia	4,948	0.76	1.70
Sverdlovsk Oblast	4,406	0.68	0.10
Khanty-Mansi Autonomous Okrug	4,382	0.67	0.28
Republic of Bashkortostan	4,373	0.67	0.11
Moscow Oblast	3,507	0.54	0.05
Saint Petersburg	3,349	0.52	0.07
Rostov Oblast	3,046	0.47	0.07
Krasnoyarsk Krai	1,970	0.30	0.07
Stavropol Krai	1,861	0.28	0.07
Tatarstan	1,758	0.27	0.05
Tomsk Oblast	1,705	0.26	0.16
Kemerovo Oblast	1,701	0.26	0.06
Krasnodar Krai	1,616	0.25	0.03
Yamalo-Nenets Autonomous Okrug	1,532	0.23	0.29
Sakha (Yakutia)	1,338	0.21	0.14
Primorsky Krai	1,235	0.19	0.63
Other regions (under 1,000 persons)	12,210	1.88	—
Total	647,732	100.00	0.45

More than two-thirds of Russia's Kazakh population lived in the border regions of Astrakhan, Orenburg, Omsk, Saratov, Volgograd and Chelyabinsk oblasts, reflecting historical settlement patterns along the Russia–Kazakhstan border.

== Notable Kazakh Russians ==
- Gulzhan Moldazhanova (Kazakh: Gulzhan Talapkyzy Moldazhanova) is a businesswoman who was CEO for Basic Element and was named among the most powerful women of the mid- to late 2000s. In 2018, she and others resigned from Russian company Rusal as it was facing sanctions from the US.
- Elizabet Tursynbayeva (Kazakh: Elizabet Tursynbayeva) is a Kazakh figure skater. She is the 2019 World silver medalist, the 2019 Four Continents silver medalist, the 2019 Winter Universiade silver medalist. Tursynbayeva is the first female skater to land a quadruple jump in senior competition.
- Damir Ismagulov (Kazakh: Damir Amankeldyuly Ismagulov) is a Russian mixed martial artist of Kazakh heritage, who is currently fighting in the Lightweight division for the Ultimate Fighting Championship. He is the former M-1 Global lightweight champion.
- Talgat Musabayev (Talǵat Amankeldiuly Musabaev) is a Kazakh test pilot and former cosmonaut who flew on three spaceflights.
- Timur Bekmambetov (Kazakh: Temir Nurbakytuly Bekmambetov); is a Russian-Kazakh director, producer and screenwriter who has worked on films, music videos and commercials. He is best known for the film Night Watch (2004) and its sequel Day Watch (2006), and the American films Wanted (2008) and Abraham Lincoln: Vampire Hunter (2012).
- Altynai Asylmuratova (Kazakh: Altynaı Abdýahımqyzy Asylmuratova) is artistic director of the ballet company at Astana Opera[1], and a former prima ballerina with the Kirov Ballet/Mariinsky Theatre and a guest artist all over the world.
- Erik Kurmangaliev (Kazakh: Erik Salimuly Kurmangaliev) was a Russian-Kazakh opera singer, actor and a leading public figure in Russia's perestroika music scene.
- Eldor Urazbayev (Eldar Muhameduly Urazbayev) - Russian film director, screenwriter and Producer Honored Worker of Culture of the Russian Federation (1998).
- Askar Zhumagaliyev (Kazakh: Asqar Qýanyshuly Jumaǵalıev) is a Kazakh politician. He was the Deputy Prime Minister of the Republic of Kazakhstan from 29 August 2017 until the government was dismissed on 25 February 2019. Zhumagaliyev was the Deputy Minister for Investment and Development of Kazakhstan,
- Aman Tuleyev (Kazakh: Amangeldi Moldaǵazıulı Tóleev), is a Russian statesman. He was governor of Kemerovo Oblast from 1997 to 2018 and became the chairman of the Council of People's Deputies of the Kemerovo oblast since April 2018.
- Vladimir Vasilyev (politician) (Kazakh: Alik Abdualiuly Asanbayev) is a Russian politician. Head of the Republic of Dagestan.
- Batyrkhan Shukenov (Kazakh: Batyrhan Qamaluly Shúkenov) was a Soviet Kazakhstan and Russian singer, musician, composer, and poet.
- Bari Alibasov (Kazakh: Bari Karimuly Alibasov) is a Moscow-based musical producer best known for creating a successful Russian boy band Na-Na in 1989. Previously he had managed the jazz band Integral from 1965 till 1989. Meritorious Artist of Russia (1999).
- Albina Dzhanabaeva (Kazakh: Albina Boriskyzy Dzhanabaeva) is a Russian singer, actress, TV-Host. Best known for being a member in the Ukrainian girl group VIA Gra from 2004 to 2013.
- Natalya Arinbasarova (Kazakh: Наталья Өтеуліқызы Орынбасарова) is a Soviet actress.
- Kai Metov (Russian: Кай Метов; September 19, 1964, Karaganda, Kazakh SSR, USSR) is a Russian singer-songwriter and composer. Honored Artist of Russia (2015).

== See also ==
- Kazakhstan–Russia relations
- Kazakh diaspora
- Immigration to Russia
- Russians in Kazakhstan
