= Koksay =

Copper mine in Kazakhstan

Koksay deposit
- Location: Almaty Region, Kazakhstan
- Products: Copper
- Company: KAZ Minerals
- Acquired: June 2014

Koksay (Kazakh: Көксай, Kóksaı) is a copper deposit located in south eastern Kazakhstan in Almaty region around 230 km from Almaty. The deposit is owned by Russian Copper Company .

== General ==
The project is at scoping stage. It has an estimated production life of over 20 years with a measured and indicated mineral resource of 701 MT with copper grade of 0.44%. The estimated annual production is 85 kt of copper in concentrate along with gold, silver and molybdenum by-products.

== See also ==
- KAZ Minerals
- Bozshakol
- Aktogay
- Bozymchak
