= Al-Farabi Kazakh National University =

University in Almaty, Kazakhstan

- Äl-Farabi atyndağy Qazaq Ūlttyq Universitetı
- Type: National
- Established: 1934
- Rector: Janseiıt Tüimebaev
- Students: 20,000
- Undergraduates: 16,000
- Postgraduates: 4,000
- Location: Al-Farabi Avenue, 71, Almaty, Kazakhstan; 43°13′30″N 76°55′16″E
- Campus: urban
- Website: www.farabi.university

Al-Farabi Kazakh National University (Kazakh: Әл-Фараби атындағы Қазақ ұлттық университеті), also called KazNU or KazGU, is a national research university located in Almaty, Kazakhstan. Named after philosopher and scholar al-Farabi, it is one of the country's largest universities.

KazNU is Kazakhstan's oldest classical university. It was established on November 13, 1933 by a resolution from the Soviet Communist Party's Kazakh Regional Committee. In 2023, KazNU was ranked 150th in the world by the QS World University Rankings.

In 2001, KazNU was classified as a "national" university by the government of Kazakhstan. More than 20,000 students study at KazNU, and there are more than 2,500 faculty members working there, including professors, associate professors, 400 Doctors of Science, and more than 800 Candidates of Science.

In 2021, KazNU was named one of the Top 500 Universities in the World.

== Campus ==
Al-Farabi Kazakh National University has its own campus, known as "Kazgugrad". It is located in one of the most beautiful areas of Almaty, and, with an area of 100 hectares, is the largest campus in Kazakhstan. It lies between Timiryazev Street, Al-Farabi Avenue, and the Vesnovka River.

The main building of Kazgugrad is 15 stories tall and hosts the university administration, as well as the history, economics, law, philology, and journalism departments. The campus consists of thirteen educational buildings with a total area of 165,000 m^{2} and scientific laboratories with a total area of 18,940 m^{2}. The campus also contains seventeen dormitories.

In a second, smaller campus located at the intersection of Karasay Batyr and Masanchi streets, there are four more departments: Philosophy and Political Science, Oriental Studies, Preparatory, and International Relations. The Physics, Mechanics-Mathematics and chemistry departments were formerly located on the second campus; in 2011 they moved to newly constructed buildings on the first campus.

== History ==
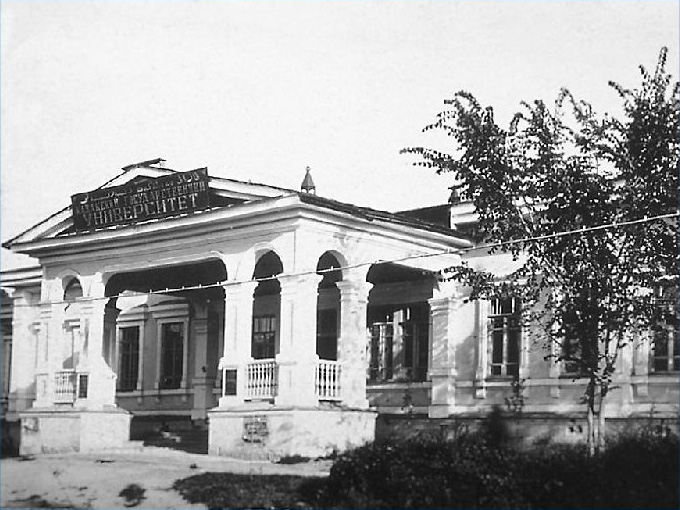
Main buildings of the university in Almaty, 1934.

Al-Farabi Kazakh National University officially opened on January 15, 1934. It was established by the decree of the Council of Peoples’ Commissars of the USSR and Kazakh Regional Committee of the Communist Party of the Soviet Union.

In January 1934, the first entrance exams in the faculties of Biology, Physics, and Mathematics were held. In September, they were held in the Faculty of Chemistry. In 1937, the first Faculty of Humanities, the Faculty of Foreign Languages, was established; a year later, the Faculty was merged into the Faculty of Philology. In May 1941, the Faculty of Journalism was established after KazNU merged with the University of the Kazakh Communist Institute of Journalism.

After the Second World War, new faculties were opened. In August 1947, the Faculty of Geography was established and, in 1949, the faculties of Philosophy and Economics. The Faculty of Law was established in 1955 after KazNU merged with the Alma-Ata Institute of Law.

During the same period, a strong scientific educational and methodological base also emerged at the university. By the mid-1980s, there were 98 departments, 43 scientific research laboratories and 9 scientific research groups at KazNU. The faculty staff consisted of 1,180 people; among them were professors and lecturers, 30 academicians, AS KazSSR correspondent members, more than 100 doctorate degree holders, and more than 600 Candidates of Science. They were trained on 21 specialties and 74 specializations.

== Faculties ==
=== Faculty of Biology and Biotechnology ===
The Faculty of Biology is the oldest faculty in the university, having existed since the school's founding. In accordance with its conducted scientific research and modern educational programs of training specialists, it has been renamed the Faculty of Biology and Biotechnology. Today, it is a major innovative scientific and educational center, where both students and teachers are involved in conducting fundamental and applied research in 2 research institutes (Biology and Biotechnology Problems and Environmental Problems). The faculty has 4 departments: Biodiversity and Bioresources, Biotechnology, Molecular Biology and Genetics, and Biophysics and Biomedicine, in addition to a Bio clinic and Aerobiological Station. An important subdivision of the faculty is the Biological Museum, which contains more than five thousand endemic and rare specimens, which are unique objects of research.

=== Faculty of Physics and Technology ===
The Faculty of Physics and Technology is a continuation of the traditions of the Faculty of Physics and Mathematics, one of the first departments of the university. Today, the faculty includes three research institutes.

Under the guidance teaching staff, students are taught in Kazakh, Russian, and English. From early courses students are involved in research on modern physics and technology within the framework of established scientific schools. The faculty have created new courses in relevant areas.

=== Faculty of Chemistry and Chemical Technology ===
The Faculty of Chemistry and Chemical Technology, which opened in 1934, was one KazNU's first departments. The faculty occupies a separate 5-storey academic building and has two research institutes. Training is conducted in 3 languages (Kazakh, Russian, and English) in 70 laboratories and 4 computer labs equipped with modern equipment. Specialists are trained by highly qualified lecturers, including 45 Doctors of Sciences, 85 Candidates of Sciences and 40 Doctors of Philosophy. All of this faculty's Bachelors, Masters and Doctorate programs are accredited by the German ASIIN agency. The faculty trains specialists under 2 diploma programs with Belgorod Uni varsity, the Chinese University of Oil, Taipei University, Saitama University, D. I. Mendeleev Russian Chemical Technology University, and Ufa Petroleum Technical University. Graduates can take courses in Lyon-1 (France), Valencia (Spain), Poland, and Romania, among others places. Students of the faculty have internships at companies in the chemical, petrochemical, pharmaceutical, and metallurgical industries, such as Karachaganak Petroleum Operating JSC, Atyrau Oil Refinery LLP, CNPS-Aktobemunaigas JSC, KazPhosphat LLP, STC KazTransOil JSC, TsinKaz LLP, DorPlast Invest LLP, and Zerde-Fito LLP.

=== Faculty of Philology and World Languages ===
The Faculty of Philology and World Languages, which was founded by M. Auezov, A. Margulan, B. Kenzhebayev, and M. Balakaev, is rich in traditions. The faculty has six departments, five of which—the Departments of Kazakh Linguistics, Kazakh Literature and Theory of Literature, Russian Philology and World Literature General Linguistics and European Languages, and Foreign Philology and Translation Studies—are graduating departments, which train future specialists. The Chair of Foreign Languages provides qualified training in world languages.

The department has close ties with major creative unions and research institutes, where students successfully complete their research internships. These departments, institutes, and laboratories employ teachers and scientists who are well known in Kazakhstan and abroad. Special attention is paid to academic mobility. In the 2016–2017 academic year, the following foreign professors worked at the faculty: Snodgras N. (USA), Seth Agbo (Canada), Margaret Dorline (Holland), Hancock M. (USA), Anatoly Kim (Russia), Rafael Velez-Nunez (Spain), Nussier M. (France), Najie Yildiz (Turkey), and Edgar Hofmann (Austria). 26 American students were trained under the Flagship program.

=== Faculty of Journalism ===
The faculty has been training journalistic personnel since 1934. In the more than 90 years of its existence, the faculty has trained 16,000 qualified specialists for various types of media.

Graduates of the faculty work in periodicals, on television and radio, in publishing houses and foreign correspondents, in senior positions in the government, and head the editorial boards of many national and regional newspapers and magazines. The faculty of journalism has strengthened its faculty, regarded the strongest at KazNU, and its unique training base. The faculty has teachers, scientists and media practitioners, among them 9 doctorate degree holders and more than 30 Candidates of Science. The faculty's scientific foundation was laid by many founders of Kazakh journalism theory, including H. Bekhozhin, T. Amandosov, T. Kozhakeev, M. Barmankulov, M. Dmitrovsky, and Y. Krikunov. The Dean of the Faculty of Journalism is Kanat Auyesbay.

=== Faculty of Information Technology ===
On January 15, 2018, the Faculty of Information Technology was opened. The mission of the IT faculty is to "train world-class, highly qualified specialists for the dynamically developing IT sector of the national economy, and to create a scientific and educational center that makes significant contributions in the global and national educational space in the training of IT specialists, taking into account the needs of the modern IT market and the requirements of professional and educational standards."

=== Faculty of History, Archaeology and Ethnology ===
The Faculty of History, Archaeology and Ethnology was founded in 1948. It trains highly qualified specialists in national and foreign history, archaeology, ethnology, museum management, monuments protection, archival science and librarianship.

Distinguished historians-academicians A. M. Pankratova, S. M. Pokrovsky, and corresponding member of the Kazakh SSR Academy of Sciences and doctor of historical sciences professor E. B. Bekmakhanov stood at the origins of the faculty.

Today, the staff of the faculty consists of 80 people: 27 of them Doctors of Sciences, 40 Candidates of Historical Sciences, and 5 Doctors of Philosophy. To date, the training of specialists is conducted in a three-stage system: Bachelor, Master, and Doctorate.

=== Faculty of Philosophy and Political Science ===
The history of the Philosophy and Political Science faculty dates back to 1947, when the Department of Psychology and Logic was founded, and then in 1949, when the Philosophy and Economics Departments, named after S. M. Kirov, were established at KazNU. The organizer of the Philosophy Department was N. P. Dardikin, a graduate of the Red Professorship Institute of the Central Committee of the All-Union Communist Party. In 1951, the Philosophy and Economics Departments were merged into the Philosophy and Economics Department, with Candidate of Economic Sciences and Associate Professor F. A. Zherebyatiev being appointed as its head. The Philosophy and Economics Department existed until 1954, when it was closed due to the fact that the prerogative of training philosophical personnel was given only to the Moscow, Leningrad, and Kiev State Universities.

From the early 1970s, foreign students began to study at the department. The first were 13 students from Cuba, and then there were students from many countries in Asia and Africa. About 400 qualified specialists were trained by the faculty for Cuba, Afghanistan, Laos, Cambodia, Burkina Faso, Mongolia, India, and Pakistan. The faculty was the centre of philosophical education in the Central Asian region, in particular, it trained personnel for the Republic of Kyrgyzstan. In 1991, the faculty was divided into the Department of Philosophy and Political Science and the Department of Economics and Sociology.

=== Higher School of Economics and Business ===
The Higher School of Economics and Business is one of the oldest divisions of KazNU. The University Faculty of Economics was established in 1949. In 1951, by the decision of the Academic Council of Kazakh State University, the two previously independent Economic and Philosophical Faculties were merged into a single Faculty of Philosophy and Economics. The Faculty of Economics underwent significant changes due to the establishment of the Almaty Institute of National Economy in 1963.

=== Faculty of Law ===
In 1955, the Faculty of Law was established when KazNU merged with the Almaty Institute of Law. During its 63-year history, it has trained about 35,000 legal professionals, including judges, prosecutors, law enforcement and public security officers, notaries, lawyers, and jurists. Every year, about 15 scientists and professors of the faculty undergo scientific training in foreign universities and research centres. Over the last 5 years, scientists and teachers of the faculty have published more than 1,000 scientific and educational works.

=== Faculty of Oriental Studies ===
Education in Oriental languages (particularly Arabic) at KazNU began in the 1970s. The May 15, 1989 Decree of the Government of the Kazakh SSR merged the Department of History of Asian and African countries and the Department of Arabic language into the Faculty of Oriental Studies, which is currently the country's largest centre that prepares highly qualified specialists with the knowledge of Oriental languages. Specialists-orientalists were in demand at the time, as independent Kazakhstan was just being formed, leading to a need for official diplomatic contacts with foreign countries.

=== Faculty of International Relations ===
The Faculty of International Relations was established by Decree No. 88 on April 28, 1995 in accordance with the decision of the Academic Council of the university and at the request of the Ministry of Foreign Affairs of the Republic of Kazakhstan. The faculty is working to prepare highly qualified and competitive specialists in international relations, international law, regional studies and global economics.

=== Faculty of Pre-University Education ===
The Faculty of Pre-University Education (FED) was established in 2011 on the basis of being the preparatory Faculty for Foreign Nationals, which was founded in 1985. The university has long maintained close contacts in the field of education with more than a hundred countries around the world. At present, the university continues to develop and improve its international relations. It is steadily integrating into the European educational space.

The faculty has trained more than 7,000 foreigners from more than 100 countries, including representatives of the Kazakh Diaspora from countries abroad, students from international inter-university exchange programs, trainees of foreign companies, embassies, and international organizations. The faculty cooperates with embassies and consulates of different countries, including the United States, Japan, the Islamic Republic of Afghanistan, South Korea, Mongolia, Spain, Turkey, the People's Republic of China, and Iran.

Since 2001, the department has successfully implemented two presidential programs. Starting from 2001, more than 2000 representatives of the foreign Kazakh diaspora were trained to enter the universities of Kazakhstan, and starting from 2010, more than 420 students from the IRA were trained to enter colleges and universities of Kazakhstan. The faculty is also preparing for comprehensive testing and unified national testing (CTA and UNT).

=== Other Faculties ===
In addition to the faculties mentioned, the following faculties are also present at KazNU:

- Faculty of Mechanics and Mathematics
- Faculty of Geography and Environmental Sciences
- Higher School of Medicine

== Research Institutes ==
KazNU also has research institutes, including the:

- Institute of State and Law
- Research Institute of Experimental and Theoretical Physics (RI of ETF)
- Research Institute of New Chemical Technologies and Materials (RI of NCTM)
- Center of Physical and Chemical Methods of Research and Analysis (CPCMA)
- Research Institute of Biology and Biotechnology (RI of BB)
- Institute for Advanced Studies (IAS)
- Confucius Institute
- Science and Technology Park (Technopark)
- National Open Nanotechnology Laboratory (NONL)

== Rankings ==
University rankings

Global – Overall
- QS World: 166 (2026)
- THE World: 1201–1500 (2025)
- USNWR Global: 1230 (2025-2026)

Regional – Overall
- QS Emerging Europe and Central Asia: 16 (2022)

In 2009, KazNU was included in the Times Higher Education World University Rankings' list of the 600 best higher institutions in the world, out of a total of 16,000 participants. At the time, more than 20,000 students from various countries studied at KazNU.

KazNU was ranked 18th among countries of the emerging Europe and central Asia region in the 2020 QS EECA University Rankings and 150th worldwide in the 2023 QS World University Rankings.

== Partner universities ==
- (South Korea) Dongguk University
- (South Korea) Hankuk University of Foreign Studies
- (South Korea) Pusan University of Foreign Studies
- (South Korea) Soongsil University
- (South Korea) Catholic University of Daegu
- (Taiwan) Ching Yun University
- (Sri Lanka) Open International University for Complementary Medicines

== Notable alumni ==
- Kairat Abdrakhmanov, Kazakhstan's Minister of Foreign Affairs
- Murat Aitkhozhin, President of the Kazakhstan Academy of Sciences
- Yerik Asanbayev, former vice president of Kazakhstan
- Oralkhan Bokeev, Kazakh writer
- Gulzhana Karagusova, Kazakhstan's Minister of Social Justice
- Abish Kekilbayev, Chairman of the Republic of Kazakhstan Supreme Soviet and Secretary of State of Kazakhstan
- Aigul Kemelbayeva, Kazakh writer
- German Kim, chair of the Department of Korean Studies and one of the leading internationally recognized scholars of the Koryo-saram
- Michał Łabenda, Polish ambassador to Azerbaijan, Mongolia and Egypt
- Mukhtar Magauin, Kazakh writer and publicist
- Fuat Mansurov, Kazakh mathematician and conductor
- Aliya Moldabekova, Kazakh central bank officer
- Gulzhan Moldazhanova, Kazakh businesswoman
- Maksut Narikbaev, Chairman of the Supreme Court of Kazakhstan
- Oleg Novachuk, Kazakh businessman, currently Chief Executive of Kazakhmys
- Abdizhamil Nurpeisov, Kazakh poet and writer
- Rafika Nurtazina, Hero of Socialist Labour
- Gulnara Sarsenova, Kazakh film producer
- Kanat Saudabayev, Kazakhstan's former Secretary of State and Minister of Foreign Affairs
- Olzhas Suleimenov, poet and leader of the Nevada-Semipalatinsk anti-nuclear movement.
- Yessengaly Raushanov, Kazakh writer and poet.
- Igor Rogov, chair of the Constitutional Council
- Tauman Torekhanov, Kazakh journalist, editor and writer
- Zhanseit Tuimebayev, Kazakhstan's former Minister of Education and former ambassador to Russia
- Bakhytzhan Zhumagulov, Kazakhstan's Minister of Education
