= Vladimir Kim =

Kazakh billionaire (born 1960)

Vladimir Kim Владимир Ким
- Born: October 29, 1960 (age 65); Myrzakent, Kazakh SSR, Soviet Union
- Citizenship: Kazakhstani
- Occupation: businessman

Vladimir Sergeyevich Kim (Russian: Владимир Серге́евич Ким; born 29 October 1960) is a Kazakhstani businessman and billionaire who is the richest person in Kazakhstan. He made his wealth in Kazakhstan's natural resources sector. He owns a network of offshore companies.

== Early life ==
Kim was born in 1960. He is of Korean descent. He graduated from the Kazakh Leading Academy of Architecture and Civil Engineering (then known as the Alma-Ata Architectural Institute) in 1982 with a degree in civil engineering. He holds an MBA degree, and received his PhD in business and administrative management at the John F. Kennedy University in California in 1998.

== Career ==
In 1995, Kim was appointed managing director and chief executive officer of Zhezkazgantsvetmet JSC, Kazakhmys' core subsidiary at the time. He was elected chairman of the board of directors of Zhezkazgantsvetmet in 2000, and Chairman of Kazakhmys upon its listing on the London Stock Exchange in October 2005. Kim stepped down as chairman of Kazakhmys in May 2013 to become a non-executive director. Following the completion of the Group restructuring in 2014, Kim remained a non-executive director and a major shareholder in KAZ Minerals PLC, a mining company quoted on the London Stock Exchange, Hong Kong Stock Exchange and Kazakhstan Stock Exchange.

He holds approximately 33% of KAZ Minerals.

In 2022, Kim was ranked as Kazakhstan's wealthiest individual for the fifth year in a row by Forbes, with a fortune of $5 billion. He sits at 584th in the global rankings

In June 2023, Hitech Grand Prix motor racing team announced that Kim had bought a 25% stake of the company.

== Personal life ==
Kim is married and has four children. He resides in Almaty, Kazakhstan.
