= Bozshakol mine =

Copper mine in Kazakhstan

- Location within Kazakhstan
- Location: North Kazakhstan Province, Kazakhstan; 51.85°N 74.3°E
- Products: Copper
- Opened: Q4 2015
- Company: KAZ Minerals
- Website: Bozshakol page on KAZ Minerals website

The Bozshakol mine (Kazakh: Бозшакөл мыс кен орны, Bozshakól mys ken orny) is a large copper mine located in northern Kazakhstan in North Kazakhstan Province. Bozshakol represents one of the largest copper deposits in Kazakhstan and largest single mine development in the Commonwealth of Independent States region by both scope and volume of production. It has estimated reserves of 1.17 billion tonnes of ore grading 0.36% copper with valuable by-products of gold and molybdenum.

== General ==
Bozshakol is a green-field project under development by KAZ Minerals. It is located in northern Kazakhstan, close to existing power, transportation and other infrastructure. The project is being developed as an open-pit mine with an onsite concentrator and a clay plant. The deposit has a mineral resource of 4,1 million tonnes copper at an average copper grade of 0.36% with 5,255 koz of gold and 57 kt of molybdenum as by-products.

The Bozshakol mine and concentrator will have a production life of over 40 years, with estimated annual output of 100 kt of copper cathode equivalent in the first 10 years of operations. Expected processing capacity: at the concentrator (construction under-way) – 25 million tons of ore per annum, clay plant (construction under-way) – 5 million tons of ore annually.

The project is expected to commence commissioning on Q4 2015 with pre-production mining in H2 2015.

== See also ==
- KAZ Minerals
- Aktogay
- Koksay
- Bozymchak
