= KAZ Minerals =

British copper miner in Kazakhstan

- Company type: Subsidiary
- Industry: Mining
- Founded: 2014
- Headquarters: London, UK
- Key people: Oleg Novachuk, Chair; Andrew Southam, CEO
- Products: Copper, zinc, silver, gold
- Revenue: ▲$2,355 million (2020)
- Operating income: ▲$1,005 million (2020)
- Net income: ▲$639 million (2020)
- Website: www.kazminerals.com

KAZ Minerals is a copper producer in Kazakhstan and Kyrgyzstan, focused on the mining of copper and the development of new copper mining projects in Kazakhstan and Kyrgyzstan.

The company was listed on the London Stock Exchange and Kazakhstan Stock Exchange until it was acquired by Nova Resources in April 2021.

== History ==
In 1930 Kazakhmys' operations began at the Balkhash copper smelting complex in Kazakhstan. In 1971 smelting operations commenced at the Zhezkazgan Complex. The Government of Kazakhstan forms the company, entitled OJSC Zhezgazgantsvetmet in 1992. From 1992 to 2002, a series of privatisations reduce the Government's holding from 100% to 0%. Samsung Corporation of Korea took over management of the company in June 1995. In 1996, Samsung acquired a 40% stake but subsequently sold it.

Kazakhmys was listed on the London Stock Exchange in October 2005 at 540 pence per share, joining the broad range of international mining companies listed in London. In January 2010 Kazakhmys announced the first of two facilities, totalling $4.2 billion, from the China Development Bank Corporation, to support growth projects. In February 2010 the company completed the sale of a 50% stake in its Ekibastuz GRES-1 power plant to the National Welfare Fund Samruk-Kazyna JSC for $681 million. This was originally set out at the time of purchase in May 2008.

On 11 November 2013 the company announced the sale of its stake in ENRC. Following the transaction, which included the offer of certain Kazakhmys shares to ENRC shareholders, Kazakhmys becomes a majority free float company for the first time. On 7 January 2014 the Group approved the disposal of its 50% stake in the Ekibastuz GRES-1 power station, to become a focused, pure-play copper mining company. On 15 August 2014 the independent shareholders voted to approve the Group Restructuring. Kazakhmys PLC disposed of a number of mature assets primarily in the Zhezkazgan and Central Regions to Cuprum Holding, a company whose principal shareholder is Vladimir Kim. On completion Kazakhmys PLC was renamed KAZ Minerals PLC.

The company underwent a major restructuring on 31 October 2014 which included the disposal of mining, smelting and power assets in the Zhezkazgan and Central Regions to focus on open pit mining in Kazakhstan. The company was renamed 'KAZ Minerals PLC'. On 23 July 2014 the Group announced that it had entered into a definitive agreement to transfer certain of its mature assets in the Zhezkazgan and Central Regions of Kazakhstan to Cuprum Holding B.V. On 15 August 2014 shareholders approved a major restructuring of the Group. All outstanding conditions to the restructuring were satisfied on 31 October 2014 with economic separation effective from 1 August 2014.

In October 2020, Nova Resources, a consortium of businesses led by Oleg Novachuk, made an offer to take Kaz Minerals private in a transaction which valued the company at £3 billion.

== Operations ==
KAZ Minerals is focused on copper production but also produces and sells significant quantities of zinc, silver and gold as by-products.

The Group operates the following assets:

- East Region
  - Three underground mines
    - Orlovsky mine
    - Irtyshsky mine
    - Artemyevsky mine
  - Two concentrators
    - Orlovsky concentrator
    - Nikolayevsky concentrator
- Kyrgyzstan
  - Bozymchak

== See also ==
- Bozshakol
- Aktogay
- Bozymchak
