= Bozymchak =

Copper mine in Jalal-Abad Region, Kyrgyzstan

Coordinates: 41.2586°N 71.0647°E

- Interactive map of Bozymchak

Location
- Location: Jalal-Abad Region, Kyrgyzstan

Production
- Products: Copper

History
- Opened: commissioning commenced in 2014

Owner
- Company: KAZ Minerals
- Acquired: 2007

Bozymchak is an open-pit copper mine and concentrator in Ala-Bukinsky region, Jalal-Abad, Kyrgyzstan; it also contains gold by-product. It is being developed by KAZ Minerals. The project commenced commissioning in 2014.

== General ==
In 2014, 426 kt of ore was mined at Bozymchak mine with an average copper grade of 1%. Bozymchak is expected to have an average annual output of 6 kt of copper cathode and 28 koz of gold bar over the 18 years of operational life.

== See also ==
- KAZ Minerals
- Bozshakol
- Aktogay
- Koksay
