= Tauman Torekhanov =

Journalist, Executive Editor, Writer

- Born: Tauman Torekhanov; March 15, 1931 (age 95); Shalkar, Aktobe Province, Kazakhstan
- Education: Kazakh State University
- Occupations: Journalist; editor; writer

Tauman Torekhanov (Kazakh: Taýman Alybaıuly Tórehanov) is a prominent Kazakh journalist and executive editor who greatly contributed to the mass media of Kazakhstan and USSR for almost a half century. He is also a well-known writer and author of numerous books.

Tauman Alibayuli Torekhanov was born 1931 in a historical and famous city of Shalkar, Aktobe Province, Kazakhstan. He earned his degree with honours at Kazakh State University in 1955. After graduation, he was offered a scholarship to pursue his graduate study at Eastern Studies Faculty of A.A. Zhdanov Leningrad University. However, he could not pursue this opportunity due to financial situation. Nevertheless, Tauman Torekhanov has worked for many years as a journalist and has been the executive editor of Shalkar district newspaper for 30 years. His outstanding work and contribution to Kazakhstan's and USSR's mass media have been very well recognized. As a result, Tauman Torekhanov was awarded with multiple awards and distinctions such as Honoured Professional of the Republic of Kazakhstan award, Honourable Certificate of the Republican Higher Council, Union Press Excellence Professional Distinction Award, Honourable Certificates of Kazakhstan's and USSR's Union of Journalists, Multiple medals of USSR, and Honourable Citizen of Shalkar city and Shalkar district.

Tauman Torekhanov, a "live legend" of his native land, has authored over 200 articles, essays, etudes, sketches and stories in newspapers, magazines, radio and TV. In addition, he has written multiple books such as "Collision of Destinies", "The Tragedy of the Century", "Hercules of the Steppe", "Bloody Tragedy in the Steppe", and "Bloody Traces of the History" published by a well-known Kazakhstani publishing house, Atamura, and positively welcomed by readers. Moreover, he has authored books about his professional experience in order to help young journalists excel in their careers. Readers can find his books in different libraries around the world including but not limited to the Library Of Congress (United States), the British Library (United Kingdom), New York Public Library (United States), National Diet Library (Japan), Bibliothèque nationale de France (France), Stanford University (United States), University of California, Berkeley (United States), Harvard University (United States), University of Cambridge (United Kingdom), Massachusetts Institute of Technology (United States), Columbia University (United States), McGill University (Canada), Concordia University (Canada), Indiana University (United States), University of Wisconsin-Madison (United States), Humboldt University (Germany), University of Hamburg (Germany), Al-Farabi Kazakh National University (Kazakhstan), and K.I. Satpayev Kazakh National Technical University (Kazakhstan).

Tauman Torekhanov has met with academician A. D. Sakharov in the steppe mobile laboratory located near Mughalzhar mountains while he worked in the mass media. He has visited also "Barsa-Kelmes" test site in Aral Sea. In addition, he had an opportunity to meet and interview well-known individuals like M. Sholokhov and L. Leonov.
