= Aigul Kemelbayeva =

Kazakh writer (born 1965)

- Айгүл Кемелбаева
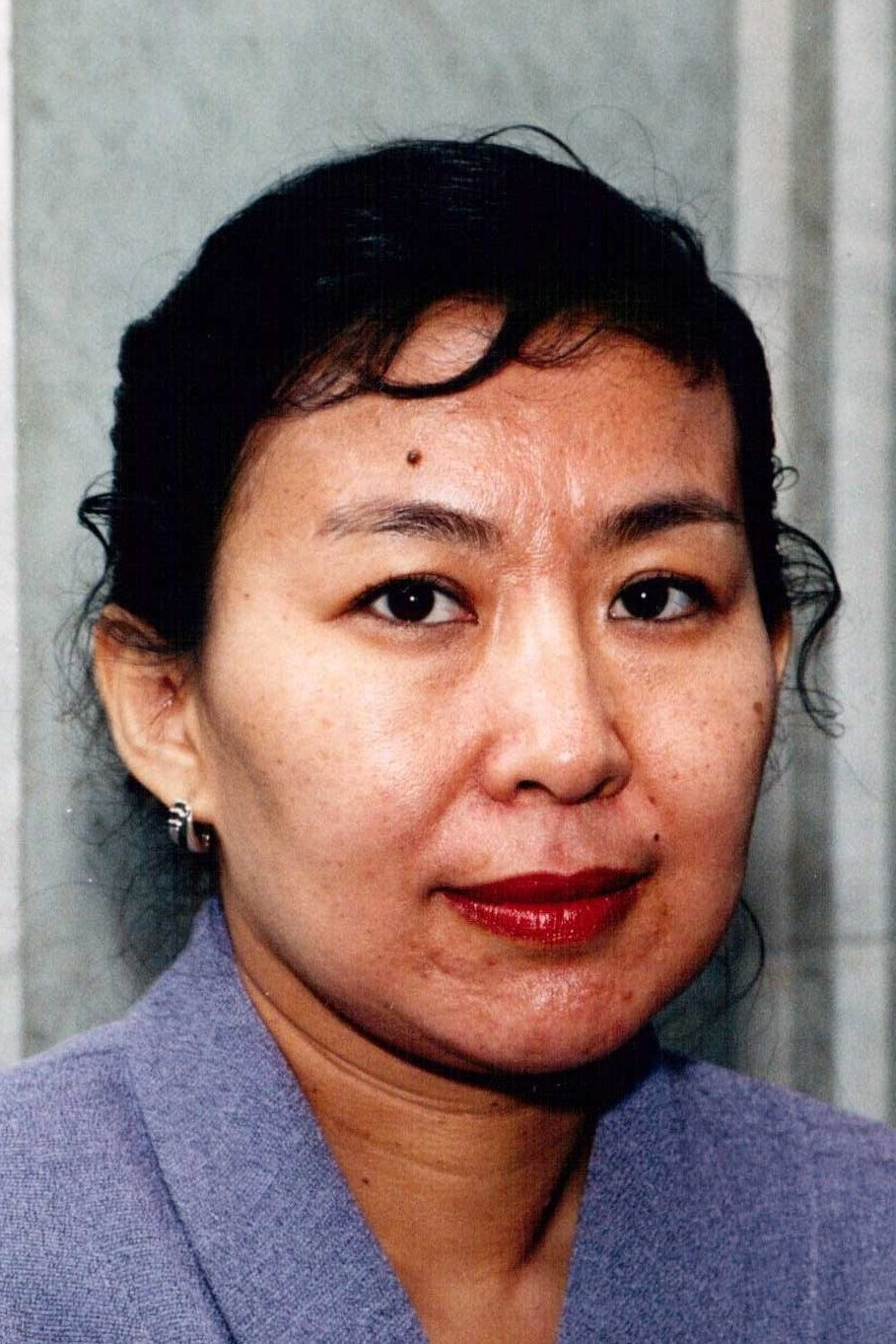
- Born: 1965 (age 60–61); Kundyzdy, Kazakhstan
- Occupations: Writer of prose and literary criticism
- Writing career
- Language: Kazakh

Aigul Zholdasbaevna Kemelbayeva (born 1965; Kazakh: Айгүл Жолдасбайқызы Кемелбаева) is a Kazakh writer of prose and literary criticism, considered an important member of the post-independence literary generation in Kazakhstan.

== Early life and education ==
Aigul Kemelbayeva was born in 1965 in the village of Kundyzdy, in the region of Semey, Kazakhstan. She began writing at a young age, producing her first novel, A Journey to the Seventh Continent, at age 15, which came second in a national youth literary contest.

After graduating from Al-Farabi Kazakh National University with a degree in journalism in 1987, she attended the Maxim Gorky Literature Institute in Moscow, graduating in 1994.

== Career ==
Kemelbayeva is now based in Nur-Sultan. She is best known for her work as a Kazakh-language writer, primarily of short stories, which have been published in such literary magazines as Zhuldyz. She has also written several books of prose and essays.

Her 2002 book Munara ("The Tower") was published in 2002. It contains two novellas, The Nanny and The Last Tiger. The Nanny is a semi-autobiographical story of a Kazakh student in Moscow immediately after the collapse of the Soviet Union. It is considered a landmark work, the first such work written by a Kazakh woman that goes beyond the socialist realist conventions that characterized prior Kazakh literature. As part of a "new tide" of intellectual prose in Kazakh literature following the nation's independence in the early 1990s, her writing has been hailed as bringing a "new artistic quality" to the genre by fusing European literary styles. She is also considered one of the first Kazakh literary writers to discuss issues of gender.

In addition to The Tower, her books include 2001's Tobylgysai, 2013's Mazhnun's Heart, and 2016's Soz Hikmet. Her story "Kôkenaj and Ķalķaman" was included in English translation in the 2019 anthology Contemporary Kazakh literature. Prose.

Kemelbayeva is also a literary critic, having written more than 200 articles on the subject. She has served as head of the literature department at the Kuanyshbayev State Academic Kazakh Music and Drama Theater. In 2005, she co-wrote the Bolat Sharip film Kunya ("The Holy Sin"), based on a story by Magzhan Zhumabayev. She has also worked on scripts for the documentaries Sultan Orazalin (2013), Suleiman Eskarayev (2012), and Zhiembet zhyrau (2014).

Her various literary awards include the Daryn national youth literature award in 2000.
