= Gulnara Sarsenova =

Kazakhstani film producer

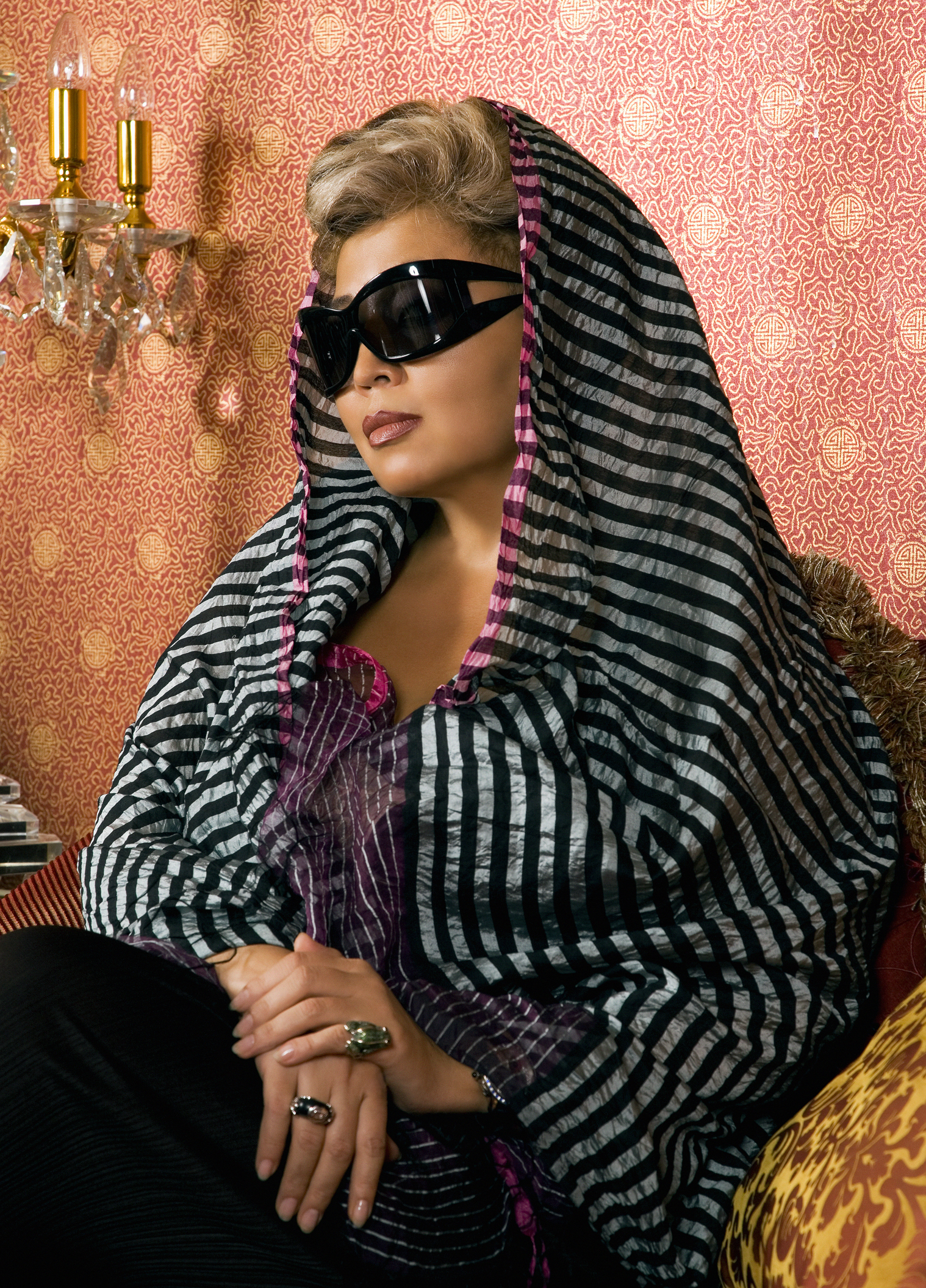
- Born: August 6, 1961 (age 64)
- Occupation: Film Producer
- Awards: Asian Film Maker of the Year 2008; Pusan International Film Festival
- Website: www.gulnarasarsenova.kz

Gulnara Sarsenova (Kazakh: Gülnar Bolatqyzy Särsenova, born August 6, 1961) is a Kazakhstani film producer who has produced several award-winning films. She is the only Central Asian producer to receive the Best Asian Filmmaker award at Busan International Film Festival, one of the most significant film festivals in Asia, in 2008.

== Biography ==
She graduated from Kazakh State University in Almaty, majoring in journalism. She completed training courses at Gerasimov Institute of Cinematography (VGIK) in Moscow. She received additional vocational education at the University of Phoenix in the United States. During 16 years she successfully worked in business structures. Sarsenova is the founder of deluxe merchandise network Fantsuzskiy Dom ("French House") in Kazakhstan. She is a founder of the newspaper Novaya Volna ("New Wave") and the Revue magazine. The subject of her PhD thesis is the aesthetics of youth television shows. In 2005 she founded her own production company Eurasia Film Production. She was awarded a French Bonaparte medal and a diploma of the President of the Republic of Kazakhstan for the achievement in business.

In 2008 Sarsenova received the international Asian Film Maker of the Year award at Pusan International Film Festival and the same year she was nominated for Oscar award with her film "Mongol" directed by Sergey Bodrov Sr. In 2005 and 2008 she was the organizer and general director for Eurasia International Film Festival, and in 2010 she was the general director of the 2nd Kazakhstani-American Film Festival held in Almaty.

== Filmography ==
=== Mongol ===
"Don't despise a weak cub, it can appear the son of a tiger." -Mongolian proverb

Little boy Temujin, who is to become Genghis Khan, the ruler of the half of the world, overcame hunger, humiliation, slavery. He was hunted, betrayed. He survived, although it seemed impossible. His powers and mind seemed superhuman. He was supported with the love of Börte, Genghis Khan's first and the most loved wife, who couldn't be taken away from him by anybody."

- NIKA Russia 2008 film awards
  - Best Film
  - Best Director
  - Best Photography
  - Best Sound
  - Best Art Directing
  - Best Costumes
- Academy Award
  - Oscar Nomination for Best Foreign Language Film 2008

=== Tulpan ===
Bulat, the main character, demobilizes and comes back to his loved Kazakhstan. Bulat wishes to become a shepherd, but in order to get a flock of sheep he must be married. And there is only one girl around for many kilometers - Tulpan.

Awards

- Cannes International Film Festival 2008, Grand prize UN CERTAIN REGARDS
- Prize of Young jury
- Prize of the French Ministry of Education,
- ASIA PACIFIC SCREEN AWARDS – Asia Pacific Screen Awards Best feature film
- Tokyo International Film Festival 2008 – SAKURA GRAND PRIZE, Prize for the "Best Director"
- London BFI International Film Festival 2008 – Grand prize "The Sutherland"
- Karlovy Vary International Film Festival 2008 – First prize "East of West"
- Montreal International Film Festival of New Cinema 2008 – Grand-prize (Louvre d' Or)
- Zurich Int Film Festival 2008 – Grand prize "Golden Eye"

The film received a total of 53 awards at various International Film Festivals all over the world throughout 2008–2009.

=== The Market: A Tale of Trade ===
A semi-musical film about cross-border black-market trade between Turkey and Azerbaijan. The film explores themes of trade, globalization, and social change and was inspired by the works of Bertolt and Yılmaz Güney.

- Best male actor (Tayanc Ayaydin) at the Festival De La Geiite
- IFF at Gente I Grand prize
- Antalya Golden Orange Film Festival
  - Best film
  - Best script
  - Best male actor (Tayanc Ayaydin)
  - Best costumes (Zeynep Sarikaya)

=== In the Electric Mist ===
In the Electric Mist with the Confederate Dead is another popular Dave Robicheaux series of novels by James Lee Burke. Dave is thrust back 30 years. A hurricane had just hit the area and Dave was out cruising the thrashed swampland at night. In the distance he sees two men with a black man in tow. The black man is wrapped in chains and shot to death by his captors. For 30 years the unsolved murder has hung in the back of Dave's mind. Dave does have some help though, provided indirectly by Elrod Sykes. Elrod speaks of seeing the ghosts of Confederate Army soldiers in swamps. He speaks to them and they give him some sense of guidance. Dave dismisses Elrod's story to alcohol induced haze. That is until Dave sees the ghosts himself. Now, a Civil War general is on Dave's side, providing sage advice that keeps Dave from getting completely out of control. Directed by Bertrand Tavernier. Produced by Michael Fitzgerald, Gulnara Sarsenova, Frederic Bourboulon.

- Nominated for Golden Berlin Bear at the Berlin International Film Festival 2009

=== Letters to an Angel ===
An independent single woman comes back home late at night accompanied by a man she met, who turns out to be the Writer. They spend a night together in her apartment. They both are infatuated and enchanted by each other. The Writer tells beautiful and romantic love fables, and the heroine, in return, tells him about her love sufferings and passionate love to two young men. The love story ends tragically – the heroine loses both men over one night. However the film ends unexpectedly, raising the question whether the Heroine's story is Writer's fiction or not? Did such woman really exist? Or is she just a fiction of the Writer?

=== Astana My Love ===
Episodic television series Astana – My Love is a romantic love story, full of intrigue, drama and entwinement of a number of stories. It is a story about main character Erlan, who saw long successful life ahead of him, but he is betrayed by his best friend Abzal and thus has to start his life all over again. Another character is a Turkish beauty Inzhu who arrives to Astana and finds her happiness here. This story could only happen in this blessed and wonderful place – in the capital of Kazakhstan, Astana. Only owing to this new glorious energy that this city is charged with, the story of young couple becomes more like a fairy tale. Astana is also a character in the film. This is a story Astana connecting people and changing their fates.

The film Astana – my Love is a joint project of Kazakhfilm Studios named after Shaken Aymanov with the largest Asian TV company TRT (Turkey). Film Format: 12 episodes, 52 minutes each, shot in a new, state-of-the-art-format Red One (digital cinema).

=== Baikonur ===
The magical love story centers on the French space tourist Julie (played by Marie de Villepin), who lands in the steppes of Kazakhstan after her return from orbit, and the local villager Iskander (Alexander Asochakov), also known as Gagarin, who finds her in the stranded capsule and takes her back to his jurta. Since she has lost her memory, she thinks she is his wife and all kinds of misunderstandings arise. The first ever film that was allowed to be shot at the Baikonur cosmodrome. Directed by Veit Helmer.

=== My Star ===
The film follows Dariga Nazarbayeva as she reflects on her development in vocal performance while presenting a selection of internationally recognized musical works. It explores her artistic approach by combining personal experiences with her interpretation of music.

Through performances and travel across various cities and locations, the film presents elements of her career and perspective on music, focusing on themes of artistic expression and personal development.

=== Parallel Worlds ===
This is a lyrical drama. It was adapted from a play by writer Yermek Amanshayev. The theatrical play "Balcony" was resumed in 2011 in Russian Academic theater named after Lermontov in Almaty. The film is a Kazakhstani and Russian co-production – Eurasia Film Production company and Interfest film company in person of renowned Renat Davletyarov

=== The Voice of the Steppe ===
This film tells the story of two main characters – Anatole, an elderly Frenchman and Abai, a young Kazakh, who met each other by the fate and providence in unexpected situation and they together found the solution for problems of their lives.

Set in the Kazakh steppes, the story follows Anatole lerby, who as a child is separated from his familiar surroundings after a tragic incident. Under the care of Kazakh herdsman, he experiences a formative journey that shapes his outlook on life.

Little Frenchman grew up and became a celebrity in the world of sounds. After nearly fifty years, Anatole came back to Kazakhstan and discovered a new capital–Astana.

Anatole had to go through a new trial – and in this path he was helped by the young guy Abay. He, along with Anatole, grasped the beauty and mystery of the Kazakh culture and Kazakh life – and Abai managed to solve his problem with his wife Altynay .

Film script written in the genre of romantic drama, by the famous French writer Vincent Ravalek involving talented young Kazakh writer Daniar Kumisbaev. Film starring played: famous actor Gérard Depardieu from France and young Kazakh actors. A central role in the film played the legendary Kazakh actor Nurzhuman Ihtymbayev.

== Sources ==
- Gulnara Sarsenova at IMDb
