= Oralkhan Bokeev =

Kazakh writer, playwright and journalist

Oralkhan Bokey
- Born: September 28, 1943; Chingistai, (Katonkaragay district, East Kazakhstan Region)
- Died: 17 May 1993 (aged 49); Delhi, India
- Education: Kazakh State University of C. M. Kirov
- Writing career
- Pen name: O. Sadyqbaiuly
- Years active: 1970-1993
- Genre: Prose
- Notable awards: Order of the Badge of Honour

Oralkhan Bokey (Kazakh: Оралхан Бөкей; Oralhan Bökei; September 28, 1943 – May 17, 1993) was a Kazakh writer, playwright and journalist.

== Life ==
Oralkhan Bokeev was born on September 28, 1943, in Chingistai village in Katonkaragay district of Eastern Kazakhstan province. He was the only son of Bokey and Kuliya who also had five daughters - Sholpan, Airmen, Lazzat, Manshuk and Galiya. When Oralkhan was born, his father went to work at one of the Ural military factories supporting the Great Patriotic War. Hoping for the safe return of Bokey, Kuliya named her newborn son Oralkhan ("oral" in Kazakh means "come back").

After graduation from Chingistai school named after Sultanmahmut Toraygirov in 1961, he worked as a youth guide for a local Pioneer organization and a tractor driver in the "Altai" sovkhoz.

From 1963 to 1969 he took correspondence courses at the journalism faculty of the Kazakh State University of C. M. Kirov. From 1965 to 1968 he worked at the “Enbek Tuyi”, the Bolshenarym district newspaper, as a proofreader, translator and deputy editor, and in the literature department of the Eastern Kazakhstan regional newspaper "Kommunism tuyi" (later renamed into “Didar”). In 1968 Oralkhan is invited to join the staff of the “Leninshil Zhas” (later renamed into “Zhas Alash") newspaper. It was a fellow writer Sherkhan Murtaza who recognized an emerging talent in a tractor driver from Chingistai and brought him to Almaty to connect with the thriving urban writing community. Murtaza's support made great impact on Oralkhan's growth as a journalist and a writer. From 1974 to 1983 Oralkhan Bokey was a prose department manager in the literary magazine “Zhuldyz”, in 1983-1991 he served as a deputy editor of the “Kazakh Adebieti” newspaper, later rising to the chief editor position.

Oralkhan Bokeeev died on May 17, 1993, during a business trip to Delhi, India.

== Works ==
"The themes of my novellas and short stories are inspired by memories of my native land and the events of my youth,” writes Bokeev. “My countrymen, the Kazakhs, are strong, honest people with open hearts. As if enchanted, they live in the area favored by their ancestors. Devoted to their native land, they are proud, hardworking, and brave."

The first collection of short stories “Kamshyger” (“A man with a whip”), printed by the “Zhazushy” publishing house in 1970, brought a young writer well deserved recognition.

The same publisher later issued several books of his short stories and novellas: “Urker” (“Pleiades”, 1971), “Kaidasyn, kaska kulynym?” (“Where are you, my little foal?”, 1973), “Muztau” (“Ice Mountain”, 1975). Oralkhan Bokeev's collections of short stories and novellas “An salady shagyldar” (“The dunes are singing”, 1978), “Urker auyp barady” (“The Pleiades are overturning”, 1981), “Bizdin jakta kys uzak” (“The winters here are long”, 1984) were issued by the publishing house “Zhalyn”. His play “Kulynym menin” (“My little foal”) was printed by “Oner” publishers in 1986, and his essay collection “Uyikym kelmeidi” (“No sleep”) was issued by “Zhazushy”.

The trilogy “Aldangan urpak” (“The Deceived Generation”) - a collection of the hand written essays, was left unfinished. The plays “Kulynym menin” (“My little foal”, 1974), “Teketires” (“The clash of the goats”, 1976), “Kar kyzy” (“The snow girl”, 1982), “Zymyraidy poezdar” (“The trains are speeding by”, 1984), “Zhau tylyndagy bala” (“The boy behind enemy lines”, 1985), “Men sizden korkamyn” (“I am afraid of you”, 1987) were performed in the main and regional theaters of Kazakhstan and some of the former Soviet Union republics.

Oralkhan Bokeev's works were translated into many languages – Russian, French, German, Japanese, Arabic, Chinese and others. The published translations include “Sled molnii” (“The lightning trail”, Molodaya Gvardiya, Moscow, 1978), “Poyuschie barkhany” (“Singing dunes”, Sovetskii pisatel, Moscow, 1981), “Chagylgan” (“Cut up”, Kyrgyzstan, Frunze, 1981), “Sled molnii” (“The lightning trail”, Hristo G. Danov, Bulgaria, 1981), “Kerbugy” (“Fallow deer”, Estonia, 1981), “Krik” (“Scream”, Sovetskii pisatel, Moscow, 1984), “Urker auyp barady” (“The Pleiades are overturning”, Volk Und Welt, Berlin, 1982). The films “Kisikiik” (“Man-deer”, 1985, director M. Smagulov), “Saitan kopir” (“The devil’s bridge”, 1986, director D. Manabayev) and the ballet “Kerbugy” (“Fallow deer”, 1986, choreographer B. Ayukhanov) were based on Oralkhan Bokeev's works.

In 1994 the first volume of the “Tandamaly” (“Selected Works”) collection, consisting of Oralkhan Bokeev's novellas, was issued by the publishing house “Zhazushy” followed in 1996 by the second volume of the “Tandamaly” with novels and more novellas.

His book The Man-Deer and Other Stories was translated by Simon Hollingsworth, published by Kazakh PEN Club.

== Characters ==
The protagonists of his works are village people, including shepherds, horse and deer breeders, farmers, forest rangers. Bokey portrays them as people with strong spirit and clear conscience. Whether men and women, young and old, illiterate and educated, he portrays them all as struggling with the secrets and riddles of human existence. They also battle the eternal and fateful problems of the human soul.

The nature is a crucial and equal participant in his stories. It interferes with the lives of the characters, asks, guides, examines and strengthens them. In the novella "The devil’s bridge" Aspan is trapped in a snow ravine. A shepherd from the story "Singing Dunes,” rescues a sheep flock from the onslaught of mad disaster. Young tractor-drivers from the novella "Snow Girl" get lost on the road on a pitch-black January night. All of these events are real and metaphorical at the same time. Heroes are immersed in the elements of nature. The rhythm of life coincides with the rhythm of nature. All of Bokeev's prose is directed toward the contemplation of good and evil, of strength and courage, and of true and false spiritual values.

== Awards ==
- In 1976 Oralkhan Bokeev received Kazakh Republic Youth award for his play “Kulynym menin” (“My little foal”).
- In 1978 he was granted The All-Union Literature Award of N. Ostrovsky for the collection of novellas and short stories “Naizagai izi” (“The lightning trail”).
- In 1986 he received the Kazakh Republic State Award for the collection of novellas and short stories Bizdin jakta kys uzak" (“The winters here are long”).
