= Aktogay mine =

Mine in Kazakhstan

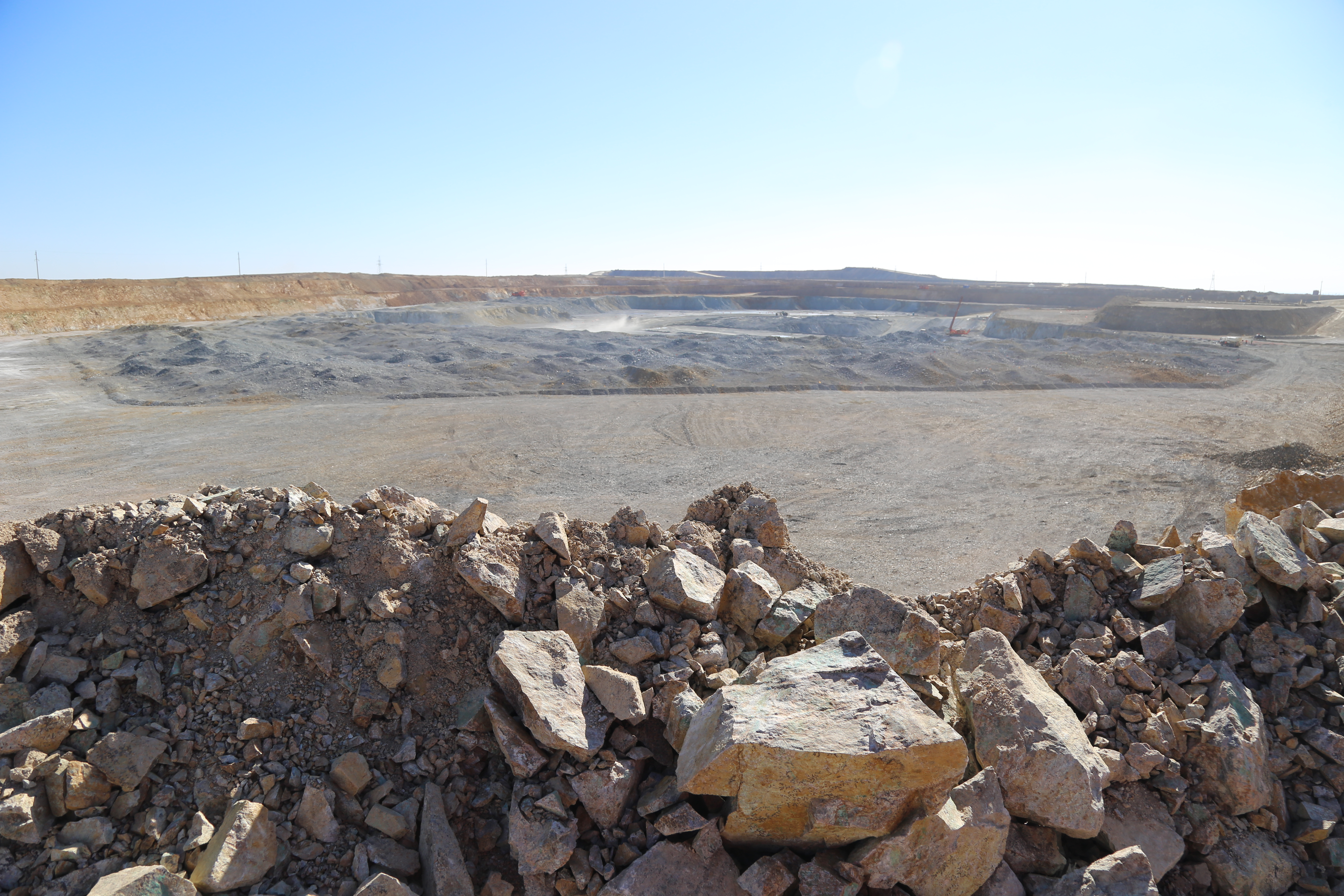
- Aktogay mine

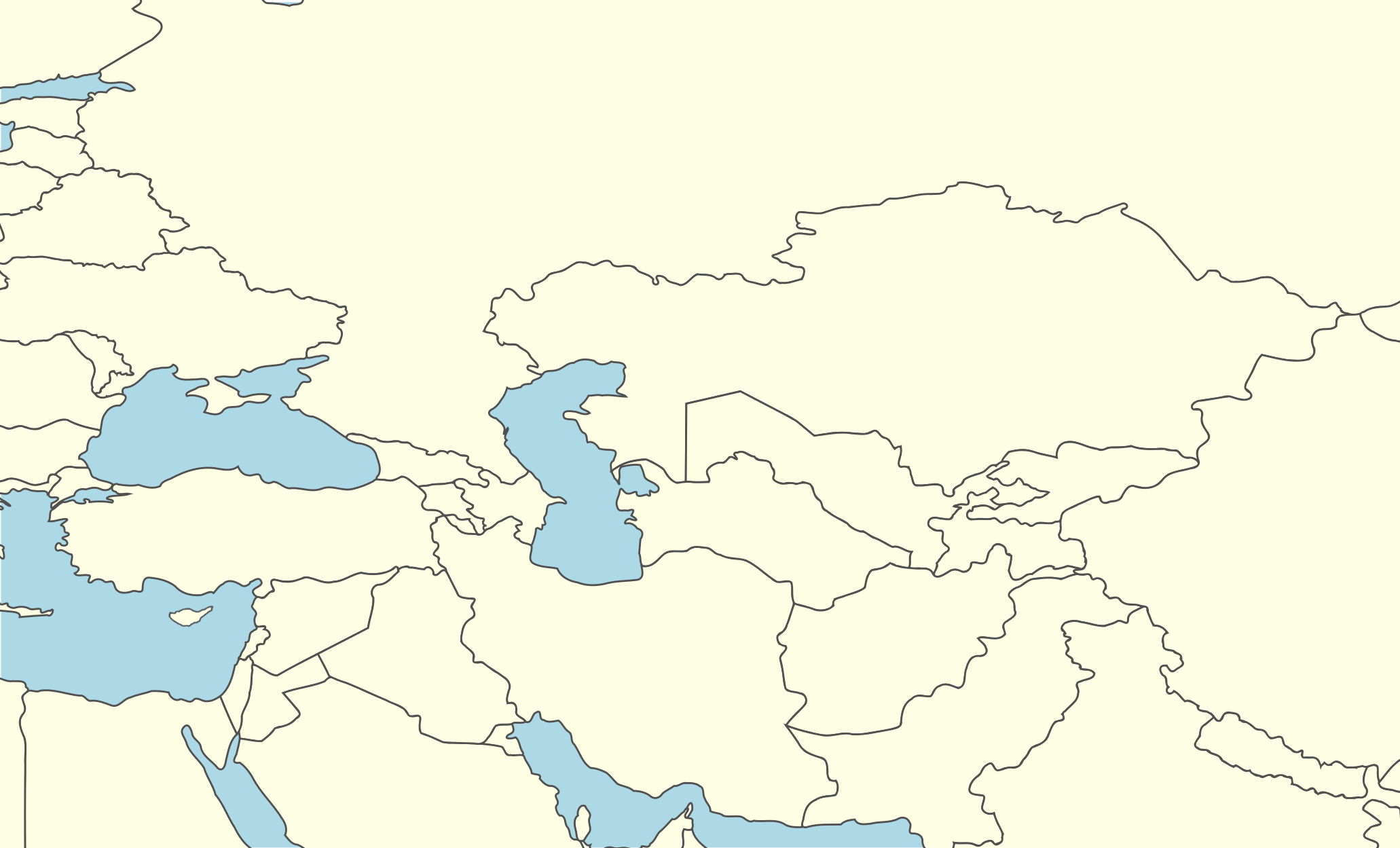
- Location within Kazakhstan Location within Central Asia
- Location: Abai Region, Kazakhstan; 46°57′N 79°52′E
- Products: Copper
- Opened: oxide ore production - Q4 2015, sulphide ore production - 2017
- Website: Aktogay page on KAZ Minerals website

The Aktogay mine (Kazakh: Ақтоғай мыс кен орны, Aqtoǵaı mys ken orny) is a large open-pit mine located in south eastern Kazakhstan in Abai Region approximately 250 km from Kazakhstan - China border. Aktogay is KAZ Minerals's second major growth project.

The Aktogay ore body consists of an oxide deposit on top of a larger sulphide deposit, the latter containing some valuable molybdenum as a by-product. The project will include an open-pit mine and concentrator and has a production life of over 50 years.

== General ==
The Aktogay project has a measured and indicated oxide ore resource of 121 MT with a copper grade of 0.37%, and a sulphide ore resource of 1,597 MT at a copper grade of 0.33%. The project will initially develop the deposit’s oxide resource which is located above the sulphide ore body at the SX/WE plant currently under construction. The sulphide resource extracted from the Aktogay mine will be processed at the concentrator on site, currently under construction. Aktogay will employ around 3,000 people at peak construction activity and around 1,500 people when operational. First oxide copper cathode production is expected in the fourth quarter of 2015, whilst first sulphide copper in concentrate output is planned for 2017. It is expected to contain around 123 million tonnes of copper, as well as another 2.063 billion tons of sulfide-molybdenum. The projected cost to build it is somewhere around $2.3 billion.

== See also ==
- KAZ Minerals
- Bozshakhol
- Koksay
- Bozymchak
