= Rafika Nurtazina =

Kazakh and Soviet school teacher (1921–2013)

Rafika Bekenkyzy Nurtazina (Kazakh: Рафиқа Бекенқызы Нұртазина, romanized: Rafïqa Bekenqızı Nurtazïna; 8 March 1921 - 1 April 2013) was a Kazakh and Soviet school teacher who was named as a Hero of Socialist Labor in 1968.

== Early life and education ==
Rafika Nurtazina was born on 8 March 1921 in village No. 6 of the Pavlodar district of the Semipalatinsk province of the Kirghiz ASSR (now the Pavlodar district of the Pavlodar region of Kazakhstan). Nurtazina was Kazakh by nationality. Her parents were the merchant Nurtaza Bekenuly Bekenov and the housewife Zulbanu Abdulkaimovna Kurmanova.

In 1939, Nurtazina graduated from high school and entered Kazakh State University named after Sergey Kirov. At the same time, since 1939, she worked as a teacher of Kazakh and German at the Russian school No. 30 in Almaty. When the World War II began, Nurtazina was forced to interrupt her studies to replace the teacher who had gone to the front and teach at school No. 75. After the war, she resumed her studies at the philological faculty of the Kazakh Women's Pedagogical Institute in Almaty, and since 1947 she began working as a teacher of Russian language and literature at the Kazakh-Russian Women's School No. 12.

== Career ==
In 1949, Nurtazina graduated from the institute, having received the specialty of Russian language and literature teacher. She continued to work at school No. 12, where she developed and introduced many expressive means of presenting educational material over time, which helped her raise the quality of her lessons. All the years of work at the school, she compiled and invented new didactic and intellectual games that facilitated the assimilation of language knowledge and created support for them in the form of vivid images and stable associations. The simplicity of presentation of such a complex subject as the Russian language helped her to make the lessons bright and expressive.

From 1968 to 1987, Nurtazina was the director of school No. 12. She developed and introduced new methods for teaching Kazakh children the Russian language. Under the leadership of Nurtazina, the school became the foremost in the Kazakh SSR. The experience of the teaching staff of the school and the innovation of its director were highly appreciated by the world pedagogical community. Nurtazina made presentations and reports at congresses and conferences of the International Association of Teachers of the Russian Language of Literature, all-Union and republican conferences and seminars in Chisinau, Tashkent, Moscow, Berlin, Prague, Budapest, and other cities and countries.

By the Decree of the Presidium of the Supreme Soviet of the USSR of 1 July 1968, Nurtazina was awarded the title of Hero of Socialist Labor with the award of the Order of Lenin and the Hammer and Sickle gold medal for great merits in education and communist education.

In 1973, School No. 12 became the first school in the republic with an in-depth study of the Kazakh language, and in 1984 it was recognized as one of the best in Kazakhstan. In 1974, Nurtazina defended her Ph.D. thesis in Moscow on the topic Ways to Activate Cognitive Interests in Teaching the Russian Language in a Kazakh School. In 1987, Nurtazina again began to work as a teacher, at the same time being a member of the scientific methodological councils of the USSR Ministry of Education (1981-1987) and the Ministry of Education of the Kazakh SSR. Nurtazina retired in 1991. Being retired, Nurtazina came to the Kazakh radio, where she taught the Kazakh language for three years.

== Social work ==
Nurtazina was the chairman of the Almaty branch of the Soviet Children's Fund (1987-1990), and a member of the Presidium of the All-Union Council of War and Labor Veterans (1981-1991).

She was a delegate of the XIV and XV All-Union Congresses of Trade Unions of the USSR, a delegate of the XIII Congress of the Communist Party of Kazakhstan, a delegate of the II and III All-Union Congresses of Teachers, a participant of the All-Union Pedagogical Readings, delegate of the I-V Congresses of Teachers of Kazakhstan.

Rafika Nurtazina died on 1 April 2013 in Almaty in the 93rd year of her life.

== Works ==
Nurtazina is an author of 300 scientific and educational works, including 130 books (Entertaining Grammar, Some Ways to Improve the Efficiency of Teaching the Russian Language in a National School, Hello, Pushkin (co-authored), and many others). She compiled 25 textbooks and teaching aids for preschoolers, and primary and secondary schools, published in Kazakh and Russian, and over 150 articles published in Almaty, Moscow, St. Petersburg, Bishkek, Berlin, Budapest, Prague, etc. Among her publications should be noted the Book for reading in the Russian language (for the 6th grade of a Kazakh school), and the textbook Russian Soviet literature (for the 10th grade of a Kazakh school), which were repeatedly reprinted.

Nurtazina was the chairman of the Presidium of the Republican Council of the Pedagogical Society of Kazakhstan (1973-1978), a member of the editorial board of the journals Russian Language in the National School (Moscow), Russian Language and Literature in the Kazakh School (Almaty) and others. Until the end of her life, she was a member of the International Association of Teachers of Russian Language and Literature (since 1968), and a member of the Kazakhstan Association of Teachers of Russian Language and Literature (since 1998).

As a recognized specialist in Russian studies, Nurtazina represented the educational interests of the USSR in Japan and Vietnam, Italy, and other states of Europe, Asia, and Africa.

== Personal life ==
Nurtazina was married to Dyusen Alibaevich Suleimenov (1914-2000), a veterinarian, and a veteran of the Great Patriotic War. She had 4 children: Gulnur Suleimenova (born 1943, doctor); Eleonora Suleimenova (b. 1945, Doctor of Philology, President of the Kazakh Association of Teachers of the Russian Language and Literature, and Professor of the Department of General Linguistics of the Kazakh National University al-Farabi, Academician of the International Academy of Sciences of Higher Education); Bayan Suleimenova (born 1949, a Russian language teacher, speech therapist, and director of boarding school No. 9 in Almaty) and Nurlan Suleimenov (born 1952, biologist).

== Selected awards ==
- Her of Socialist Labor (1 July 1968)
- Order of Lenin (1 July 1968)
- two Orders of the Badge of Honor (11 August 1960, 1963)
- Medal "For Valiant Labor in the Great Patriotic War of 1941-1945"
- Medal "Veteran of Labor"
- Honored Teacher of the Kazakh SSR (1966)
- Excellence in Public Education of the Kazakh SSR (1956)
- Honorary citizen of the city of Almaty (1994)
