= Mukhtar Magauin =

Kazakh-American writer and publicist

Mūhtar Mūqanūly Mağauin (Note: Often transliterated as Mukhtar Mukanovich Magauin through a Russified Romanization of Мухтар Муханович Магауин.) (Kazakh: Мұхтар Мұқанұлы Мағауин; 2 February 1940 – 9 January 2025) was a Kazakh-American writer and publicist.

== Life and career ==
Magauin was born in the district of Chubar-Tau in Semey region (now East Kazakhstan Province) of Kazakhstan on 2 February 1940. He graduated at the Kazakh State University (1962) and became a PhD doctor (1965) there. He was head of the literary criticism department at the "Kazakh literature" newspaper in Almaty. He published several scholarly articles and books and novels.

When he was mentioned by the Soviet study experts in the West in the book edited by Edward Allworth as one of the nationalist Kazakh writers (1973), the local Communist rulers put his name to the "black list". Most of his renowned uncensored novels were published only after the collapse of the Soviet Union.

He published the novels The Yellow Kazakh (1991), ABCs of Kazakh History (1993), Dreams of Kypchaks (2004), The Half (2007), etc.

In 1997, he became the winner of the International Prize for the Turkic speaking writers and culture workers and he received the prize from Suleiman Demirel, the President of Turkey at that time. He was also a holder of the title of the People’s Writer of Kazakhstan.

Magauin translated several short stories and novels of the prominent foreign writers (W. Somerset Maugham, H. Rider Haggard, etc.) into Kazakh. Some translations of his writings, such as the short story 'The Archivist' (1973) and an extract from the novel 'Blue Haze' (1972), have appeared in English

His use of traditional proverbs has been studied by Zhanar Abdigapbarova. Magauin died in Maryland, United States on 9 January 2025, at the age of 84.
