= Balkhashtsvetmet =

Balhashcvetmet
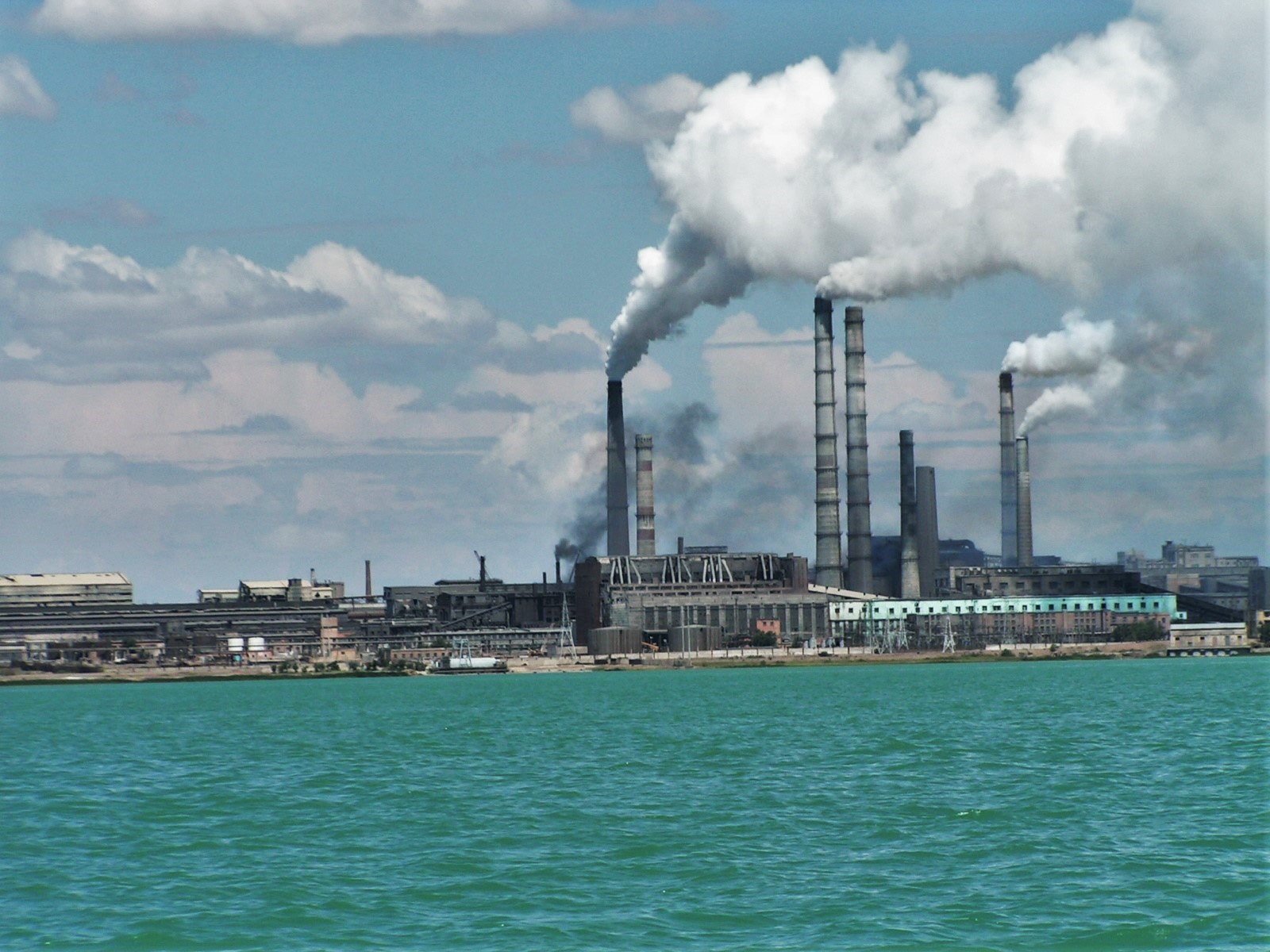
- Native name: Kazakh: Балқаштүстіметалл Өндірістік Бірлестігі; Russian: БГМК - Балхашский горно-металлургический Комбинат
- Romanized name: Balqashtústimetall» Óndiristik Birlestigi
- Formerly: Балқаш кен-металлургия комбинаты немесе БКМК (BGMC: Balkhash Mining and Metallurgical Combine)
- Company type: Public
- Industry: Metallurgy
- Founded: 1931–1938
- Headquarters: Balkhash, Kazakhstan
- Key people: A.M. Minigulov - Chairman
- Products: non-ferrous and precious metals

Balhashcvetmet ("Ferrous Metallurgy of Balkhash"), formerly known as BGMC (Russian: БГМК), for Balkhash Mining and Metallurgical Combine (Russian: Балхашский горно-металлургический Комбинат, IPA: [bɐlˈxaʂskʲɪj ˈɡornə mʲɪtəlʊrˈɡʲitɕɪskʲɪj kəmʲbʲɪˈnat]), is a copper-smelting combine located on the northern coast of the Lake Balkhash in Balkhash, Kazakhstan.

== About ==
Balhashtcvetmet specialises in the extraction of ores, metal processing and the production of non-ferrous metals and their alloys. Ore is delivered from different mines. The largest one is Kounrad mine, located 12 kilometers north of the plant. The most remote mine is Sayak, located 250 km to the east. The ore includes many different elements. It contains about 60 percent copper. The ore also contains some precious metals. Balhashtsvetmet's main products are minerals, molybdenum ores, cermets, refined copper, zinc, gold, silver, magnesium, silicon, sulfuric acid, copper sulfate, alloying elements, sheet metal and many others.

Balhashtsvetmet belongs to the Kazakhmys Corporation with head offices in London, Karaganda and Jezkazgan, Kazakhstan.

Balhashtsvetmet includes the following departments:

- AO ZOCM - a factory for non-ferrous metal processing.
- Konyratsky mine
- East Konyratsky mine
- Sayak 1 (mine)
- Sayak 4 (mine)
- Foundries
- Rolling factories

Balhashcvetmet also finances a swimming pool and the Parachute Air Club.

== History ==
In 1928, the English capitalist Leslie Urquhart wrote to the Soviet Glavkontsesskom to ask if they would give him the opportunity to mine in the Kirghiz steppes, near Lake Balkhash and beyond. Ten years later, after two five-year plans for the national economy of the Soviet Union, the Bolshevik government discovered copper on the Kounrad hills, near Lake Balkhash. In the same year, on the northern shore of Lake Balkhash, a geological survey from Leningrad arrived which was led by engineer and geologist Michael Rusakov. This group conducted the first exploration of copper deposits and got encouraging results. Eventually, the expedition concluded that the area had abundant deposits of ore, and established a copper smelting factory. Rusakov telegraphed the Committee of Geology in Leningrad that a rich copper porphyry deposit had been discovered in Kounrad, near Lake Balkhash. Soon after that, the development of Kounrad area started. In October 1931, a management organization was created, with as its main task the construction of a copper smelting plant. The coast of Bertis Bay was approved as the location of the plants and affiliated cities. The chief of building was Vasily Ivanovich Ivanov, who was later arrested in 1938 and executed as an enemy of the people.

In 1932, the sum of 100 million rubles was dedicated to the construction of the copper giant, amounting to one-third of the total capital investments allocated for development of the heavy industry of the republic.

In March 1938, testing of the equipment of the concentrating factory began, and it produced the first concentrate. In July, the first reverberatory furnace went into service — the foundation of metallurgical manufacturing. On 24 November 1938, Balkhash's first copper was shipped out. A plaque was placed at an entrance of the smelting plant commemorating this event, and 24 November is considered the birthday of the smelting plant. The ingot of Balkhash's first copper is kept in the Museum of the Revolution in Moscow.

The lives of the inhabitants of Balkhash were affected by the attack of Nazi Germany on the Soviet Union, and the workers were ordered to send more metal to the front. Many smelter workers and miners were sent away to the front, and their places in the industrial works and mines were filled with mothers, wives, and sisters. Before the war, more than 600 women worked in the factory, but by the first year of the war this number rose to 2453.

In 1966, Balhashtsvetmet was awarded the Order of Lenin. 7,500,000

== Ecology ==
Balkhashtsvetmet is the strongest environmental pollutant in the region of the Lake Balkhash. The release of wastewater from the combine into the lake leads to numerous diseases of the fauna. Industrial untreated waste water was discharged into the aquatic environment of the lake since the launch of the combine in 1938 through 1995. As a result, according to the fisheries, the contamination of components of water and air sector with heavy metals has become dominant in the present day. The content of zinc increased by 11 times, chromium by 13 times and nickel twice in the tissues of fish taken from the lake over the past 10 years.

The combine is near residential neighborhoods in the city of Balkhash. Process gases are emitted into the atmosphere without treatment of sulfur dioxide and dust containing heavy metals, such as copper, lead, and arsenic. According to numerous testimonies of inhabitants of the city, the copper smelting department of the combine emitted a large amount of gas into the atmosphere in the summer of 2004, leading to mass deaths of birds in the area. In addition to that, many anglers caught sick fish. The local authorities ignored the offense of the release of gas. However, several reports appeared in the newspapers resulting in nothing. Allergies and asthma were common diseases among residents of the city for many years.

There is very little data for the current ecological status of the Lake Balkhash and surrounding area at the moment because the previously conducted routine observations have significantly reduced and almost completely stopped research in the 1990s. The Balkhash-Alakolsky Basin Council (BABC) was established by the Act 43 of the Water Safety Code (of Kazakhstan) on July 9, 2003.

In 2010, the company was fined ₸7.5 million tenge (~US$30,000) for environmental violations.

== See also ==
- Balkhash airport
- Lake Balkhash
- List of countries by copper production
- Ferrous metallurgy
