= Eduard Ogay =

Kazakh businessman

- Эдуард Огай
- Born: 18 October 1969 (age 56); Almaty, Kazakh SSR, Soviet Union
- Occupation: Businessman
- Political party: Nur Otan
- Spouse: Marina Ogay
- Children: 3
- Awards: Order of Kurmet; Order of the Leopard

Eduard Viktorovich Ogay (oh-GUY; Russian: Эдуард Викторович Огай; born 18 October 1969) is a Kazakh businessman, shareholder and the CEO and Chairman of Kazakhmys between 2001 and 2022.

Ogay has been featured in the Kazakhstan's 50 richest and most influential businessmen ratings. He and his children own shares in Karazhyra, one of the largest coal producers in Kazakhstan (named after a major deposit). He also held a stake in Kazakhaltyn, one of the oldest gold mining companies in the country.

== Biography ==
Ogay was born in Alma-Ata on 10 October 1969. A graduate of Kazakh National Agrarian University with a degree in Economics and Management, he started out as an entrepreneur, and became the President of Kazresurs in 1996 and soon the CEO of Petrokaz LLC.

He joined Kazakhmys in 2001 as CEO, and left the company in 2005 to become a Deputy Akim of the East Kazakhstan Region. A year later, he returned to Kazakhmys as the chairman and retained this position until 2022. Ogay sat on the political council of the ruling Nur Otan political party.

== Awards ==
- Order of Kurmet (2010);
- Order of the Leopard (Kazakhstan) 3rd Class (2021).
