= Gulzhan Moldazhanova =

Kazakh businesswoman (born 1966)

Gulzhan Moldazhanova (born 11 June 1966, Almaty, Kazakhstan) is a Kazakh businesswoman who was CEO for Basic Element, and was named among the most powerful women of the mid- to late 2000s. In 2018, she and others resigned from the Russian company Rusal as it was facing sanctions from the US.

== Early life ==
Moldazhanova was born to a pharmacist mother and metallurgy student father, though she was raised by her single mother after they separated. With a head for math, she studied physics at Al-Farabi Kazakh National University, then went on to graduate with a doctorate from Moscow State University. Her connections to Oleg Deripaska began, since he was also a physics graduate of Moscow State University.

== Career ==
Moldazhanova began as a personal assistant to Deripaska in 1995, before being targeted as a high potential employee and gaining training as an accountant from Russia's Finance Academy. In the early 2000s, she grew to director within sales, marketing and strategy within Rusal.

In 2005, she was appointed as CEO of Basic Elements, which was a $14 billion private-equity holding company at that time. In 2006, she was named #22 in CNN's Global Power 50 Most Powerful Women, due to her status as CEO and her involvement in restructuring the fund around multiple sectors.

In 2008, still as chief executive of Basic Elements, she was named as #37 of Forbes 100 Most Powerful Women. The article guessed the Basic Element was looking to be listed on a foreign stock exchange, which didn't happen.

In 2009, Deripaska took over management from Moldazhanova, before ceding again to her in 2012. In 2018, Moldazhanova ended her tenure at Basic Elements, while additionally resigning from director position on the board of Rusal.

== Personal life ==
In 1999, Moldazhanova divorced her husband, with whom she has one daughter. According to Salzburger Nachrichten, Moldazhanova has an Austrian passport.
