= Balkhash Airport =

Airport in Kazakhstan

Balkhash Airport Balqaş Äuejaiy
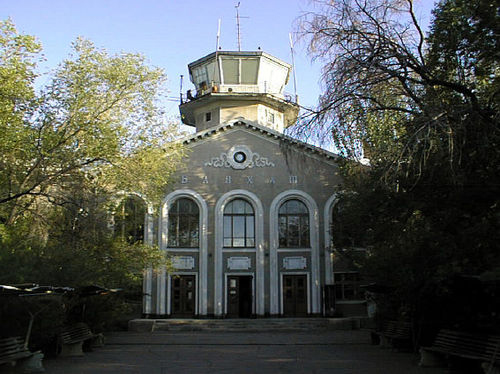
- IATA: BXH; ICAO: UAAH

Summary
- Airport type: Public/Military
- Owner/Operator: JSC "National Airport Balkhash"
- Serves: Balkhash
- Location: 6 km (3.7 mi) NE of Balkhash, Kazakhstan
- Elevation AMSL: 440 m / 1,444 ft
- Coordinates: 46°53′38″N 075°00′19″E

Maps
- Location in Kazakhstan
- Interactive map of Balkhash Airport

Runways
Direction	Length		Surface
Direction	m	ft	Surface
05/23	2,502	8,209	Concrete
- Source: AIP Kazakhstan

Balkhash Airport (Kazakh: Балқаш Әуежайы / Balqaş Äuejaiy) (IATA: BXH, ICAO: UAAH) is an airport 6 km (3.7 mi) northeast of Balkhash, Kazakhstan.

== Overview ==
Balkhash Airport is classified as a national aerodrome in the latest AIP. It is capable of accepting Ilyushin Il-76, Tupolev Tu-134, Tupolev Tu-154, Antonov An-8, Antonov An-12, Antonov An-24, Ilyushin Il-14, Ilyushin Il-18, Yakovlev Yak-40, Yakovlev Yak-42, and Antonov An-2 aircraft. It can also accept light aircraft and helicopters of all types.

The length of the runway is 2,502 m × 40 m (8,209 ft × 131 ft). A dirt runway was also used in the past, but it is now closed.

Military aircraft are also based there. In the last few years, civil aircraft rarely use this airport and the airport is mainly used by the sky diving club of the city of Balkhash and the military.

== Airlines and destinations ==
Airlines	Destinations
Qazaq Air	Seasonal: Astana
