= Balkhash (city) =

Balkhash Балқаш Balqaş
- City
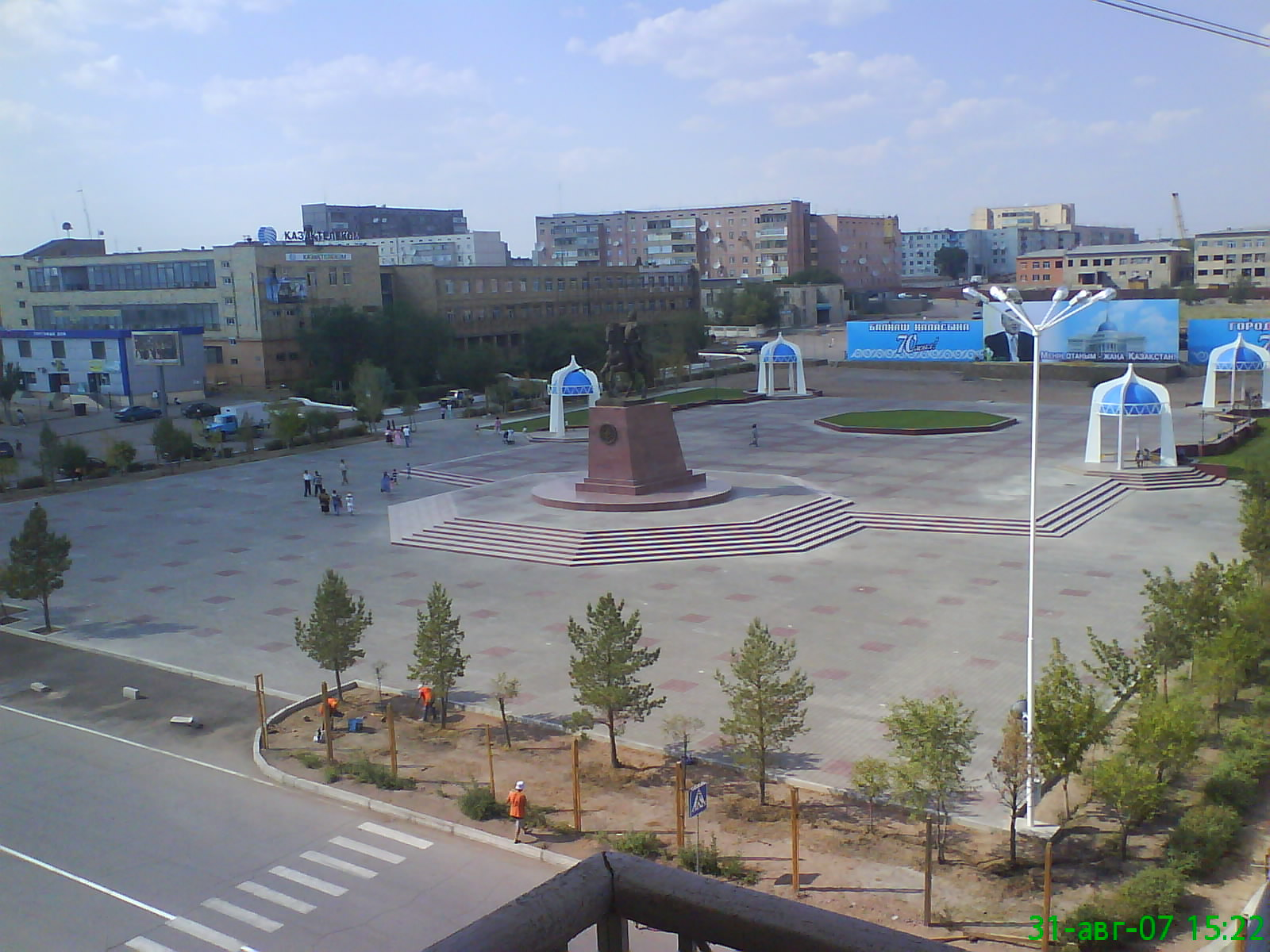
- Centre of the city

- Location in Kazakhstan Balkhash (Asia)
- Coordinates: 46°50′53″N 74°59′42″E
- Country: Kazakhstan
- Region: Qarağandy Region
- Founded: 1931
- Incorporated (city): 1937

Government
  - Akim (mayor): Sapar Satayev
- Elevation: 440 m (1,440 ft)

Population (2009)
  - City: 68,833
  - Urban: 77,662
  - Summer (DST): UTC+6 (UTC+6)
- Postal code: 100300 - 100316
- Area code: +7 71036
- Website: balkhash.gov.kz

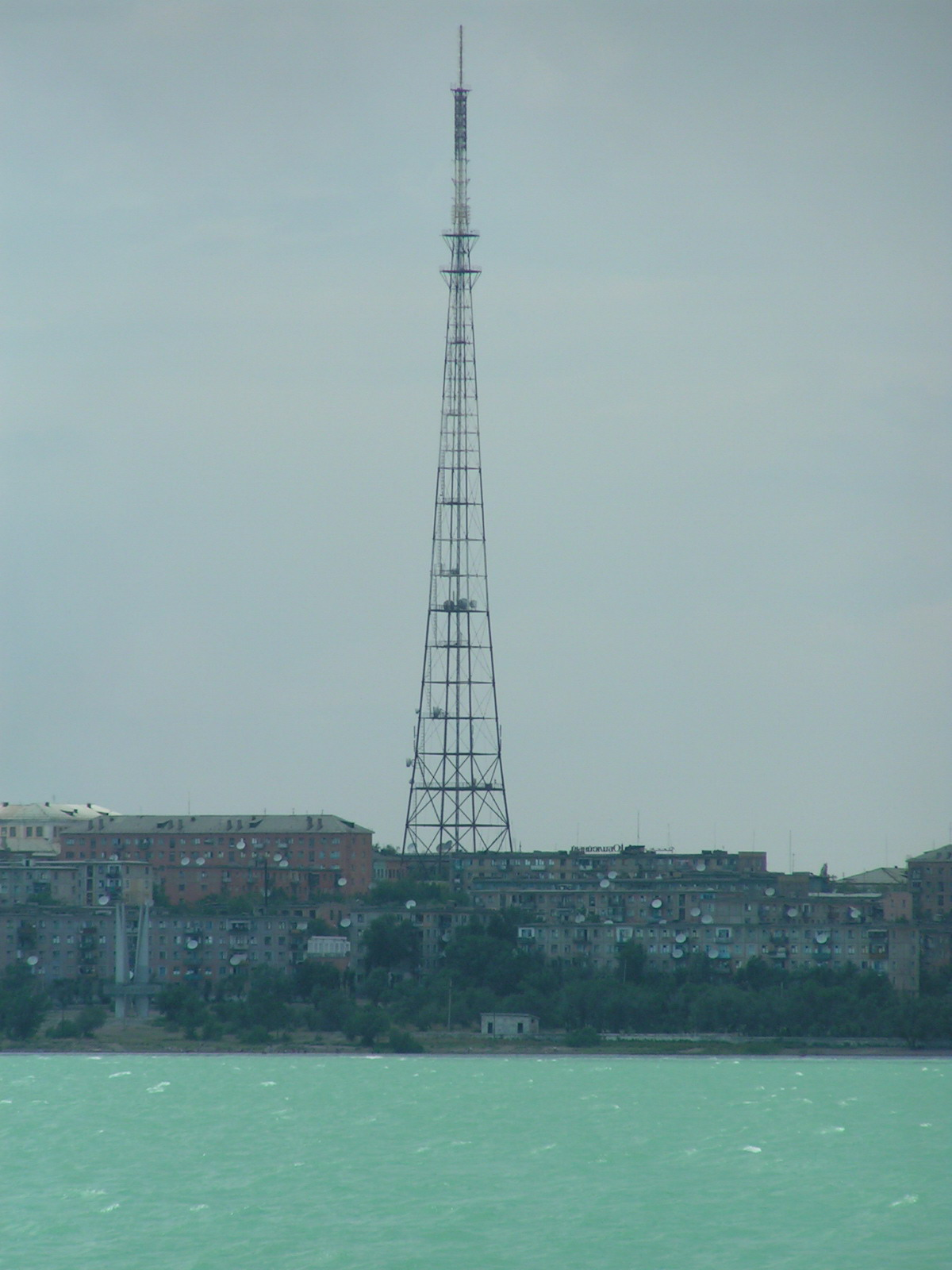
Southern view of the city Balkhash.

Balkhash (Note: Russian: Балхаш, romanized: Balhaš, pronounced [bɐlˈxaʂ]) or Balqash (Note: Kazakh: Балқаш, romanized: Balqaş, pronounced [b̥ɑɫqʰɑ́ʃ]) (Note: /bɑːlˈkɑːʃ/, UK also /bælˈkæʃ/) is a city in Kazakhstan, located on the northern shore of Lake Balkhash, on the Bay Bertys, and in the south of the Kazakh Uplands. The population of the city is 68,833 (2009 census results); 65,431 (1999 census results).

Balkhash was founded in 1937 as an industrial city centred on the mining and smelting of copper, which is still being exploited in the area. The city lies approximately 500 km west of the Chinese border, on the north side of the lake at an altitude of 440 m.

== History ==
On 11 April 1937, a small workers' settlement "Pribalkhashstroy", designed in connection with the construction of a copper factory – BGMC, was transformed into the city of Balkhash by decision of the Central Executive Committee of the Kazakh SSR. In this way, the copper factory affected the city's appearance.

On 9 November 1932, the first school was established in the city - school No. 1. The school educated a few children of the builders of the city that time. Among these children was Maria Nicolaevna Guseva (Halova). This school became a matter of her life: firstly she was one of the first pupils. Later, she became a teacher. In 1935, a section for parachuting was opened. Its first director was Dyusembayev.

During the Great Patriotic War, most of the male population was conscripted into military service and women replaced them in the copper factory.

After World War II, Japanese war prisoners took part in building the city. In particular, they built buildings, the "Palace of Metallurgists" and the local airport. Later, some of the Japanese prisoners were set free and intermarried with local Kazakhs.

After the collapse of the Soviet Union, between 1992 and 1996, the city and its residents, like most former Soviet citizens, experienced an acute crisis, including power outages, weak central heating and intermittent operation of the copper factory. Some people cooked on fires in their yards; in winter they heated their apartments with potbelly stoves. Summer cottages served as an additional source of foodstuffs, contributing to the populace's survival. In the late 1990s, the city's and country's economies stabilised. A new neighborhood was built in the city, the so-called "Canadian cottages". All schools, medical facilities and the college started to function normally.

== Administration and directorates ==
Due to the appointment of former Mayor Kadyrzhan Teylyanova as Chairman of the Committee of Fisheries of the Ministry of Agriculture of the Republic of Kazakhstan, Nurlan Erikbaevich Aubakirov (born 29.12.1975) has been the mayor of Balkhash since 29 May 2012.

Balkhash's city government also administers the urban-type settlements of Sayak (3669 people), Gulshat and Chubar-Tubek (625 people). In May 1997, the city of Balkhash was transferred from Dzhezkazgan Region to Qarağandy Region due to a boundary change.

== Population ==
The combined population of the city and its urban area is 75,453 people (2010). The ethnic composition on 1 January 2010 was:

- Kazakhs — 45,123 people (59.64 %)
- Russians — 23,609 people (31.20 %)
- Ukrainians — 1,469 people (1.94 %)
- Germans — 1,382 people (1.83 %)
- Koreans — 1,172 people (1.55 %)
- Tatars — 1,080 people (1.43 %)
- Belarusians — 279 people (0.37 %)
- Chechen people — 183 people (0.24 %)
- Azerbaijani people — 119 people (0.16 %)
- Uzbeks — 112 people (0.15 %)
- Bashkirs — 95 people (0.13 %)
- Lithuanians — 64 people (0.08 %)
- Mordvins — 60 people (0.08 %)
- Polish people — 59 people (0.08 %)
- Moldovans — 51 people (0.07 %)
- Chuvash people — 33 people (0.04 %)
- Greeks — 32 people (0.04 %)
- Others — 740 people (0.98 %)
- In total — 75,662 people (100.00 %)

In recent years, the number of Russian speakers is dramatically declining, but this is more than compensated by an influx of Kazakhs, who come mostly from rural areas, resulting in growth of the city's population after the substantial decline in the 1990s.

== Climate ==
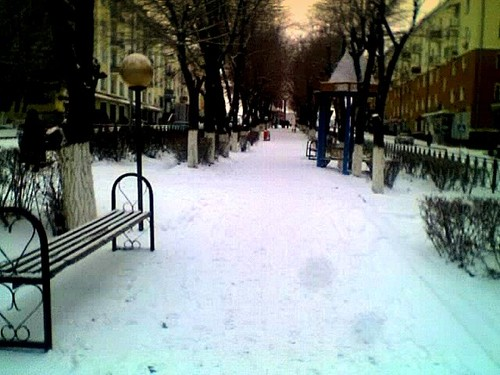
Winter in Balkhash. One of the central streets.

Balkhash has a cool semi-arid climate (Köppen climate classification BSk) bordering on a cool arid climate (BWk) with very warm summers and frigid winters. Precipitation is low throughout the year. Snow is common, though light, in winter. The lowest temperature on record is −41.2 °C (−42.2 °F), recorded in December 1938, and the highest temperature is 40.9 °C (105.6 °F), recorded in July 2005.

Climate data for Balkhash (1991–2020, extremes 1932–present)
Month	Jan	Feb	Mar	Apr	May	Jun	Jul	Aug	Sep	Oct	Nov	Dec	Year
Record high °C (°F)	7.1 (44.8)	6.1 (43.0)	24.5 (76.1)	32.5 (90.5)	36.5 (97.7)	38.2 (100.8)	40.9 (105.6)	39.5 (103.1)	37.6 (99.7)	27.2 (81.0)	17.4 (63.3)	7.5 (45.5)	40.9 (105.6)
Mean daily maximum °C (°F)	−9.0 (15.8)	−6.4 (20.5)	2.7 (36.9)	14.7 (58.5)	22.1 (71.8)	27.8 (82.0)	29.3 (84.7)	28.1 (82.6)	21.5 (70.7)	13.2 (55.8)	2.8 (37.0)	−5.4 (22.3)	11.8 (53.2)
Daily mean °C (°F)	−13.6 (7.5)	−11.6 (11.1)	−2.7 (27.1)	9.0 (48.2)	16.5 (61.7)	22.5 (72.5)	24.1 (75.4)	22.5 (72.5)	15.6 (60.1)	7.5 (45.5)	−1.9 (28.6)	−9.9 (14.2)	6.5 (43.7)
Mean daily minimum °C (°F)	−17.9 (−0.2)	−16.3 (2.7)	−7.2 (19.0)	3.8 (38.8)	10.6 (51.1)	16.7 (62.1)	18.4 (65.1)	16.5 (61.7)	9.4 (48.9)	2.3 (36.1)	−5.9 (21.4)	−13.9 (7.0)	1.4 (34.5)
Record low °C (°F)	−40.1 (−40.2)	−40.2 (−40.4)	−30.8 (−23.4)	−14.2 (6.4)	−5.5 (22.1)	3.9 (39.0)	6.9 (44.4)	3.7 (38.7)	−4.7 (23.5)	−15.0 (5.0)	−32.7 (−26.9)	−41.2 (−42.2)	−41.2 (−42.2)
Average precipitation mm (inches)	13.9 (0.55)	11.5 (0.45)	12.7 (0.50)	10.1 (0.40)	15.5 (0.61)	12.8 (0.50)	14.8 (0.58)	6.5 (0.26)	3.6 (0.14)	9.2 (0.36)	16.6 (0.65)	13.6 (0.54)	140.9 (5.55)
Average extreme snow depth cm (inches)	9 (3.5)	11 (4.3)	5 (2.0)	0 (0)	0 (0)	0 (0)	0 (0)	0 (0)	0 (0)	0 (0)	1 (0.4)	3 (1.2)	11 (4.3)
Average precipitation days (≥ 1 mm)	4.6	3.4	3.4	2.6	3.2	2.8	2.7	1.9	1.1	2.4	4.3	4.1	36.5
Average rainy days	2	2	5	7	9	8	9	6	4	7	7	4	70
Average snowy days	15	14	7	1	0.1	0	0	0	0	1	8	15	61
Average relative humidity (%)	79	78	74	56	51	46	49	47	47	60	75	79	62
Mean monthly sunshine hours	153	179	228	276	335	367	377	363	299	222	151	131	3,081
Mean daily sunshine hours	4.9	6.3	7.4	9.2	10.8	12.2	12.2	11.7	10.0	7.2	5.0	4.2	8.4
Source 1: pogoda.ru.net
Source 2: NOAA (sun only, 1961–1990), Deutscher Wetterdienst (daily sun 1961-1990)

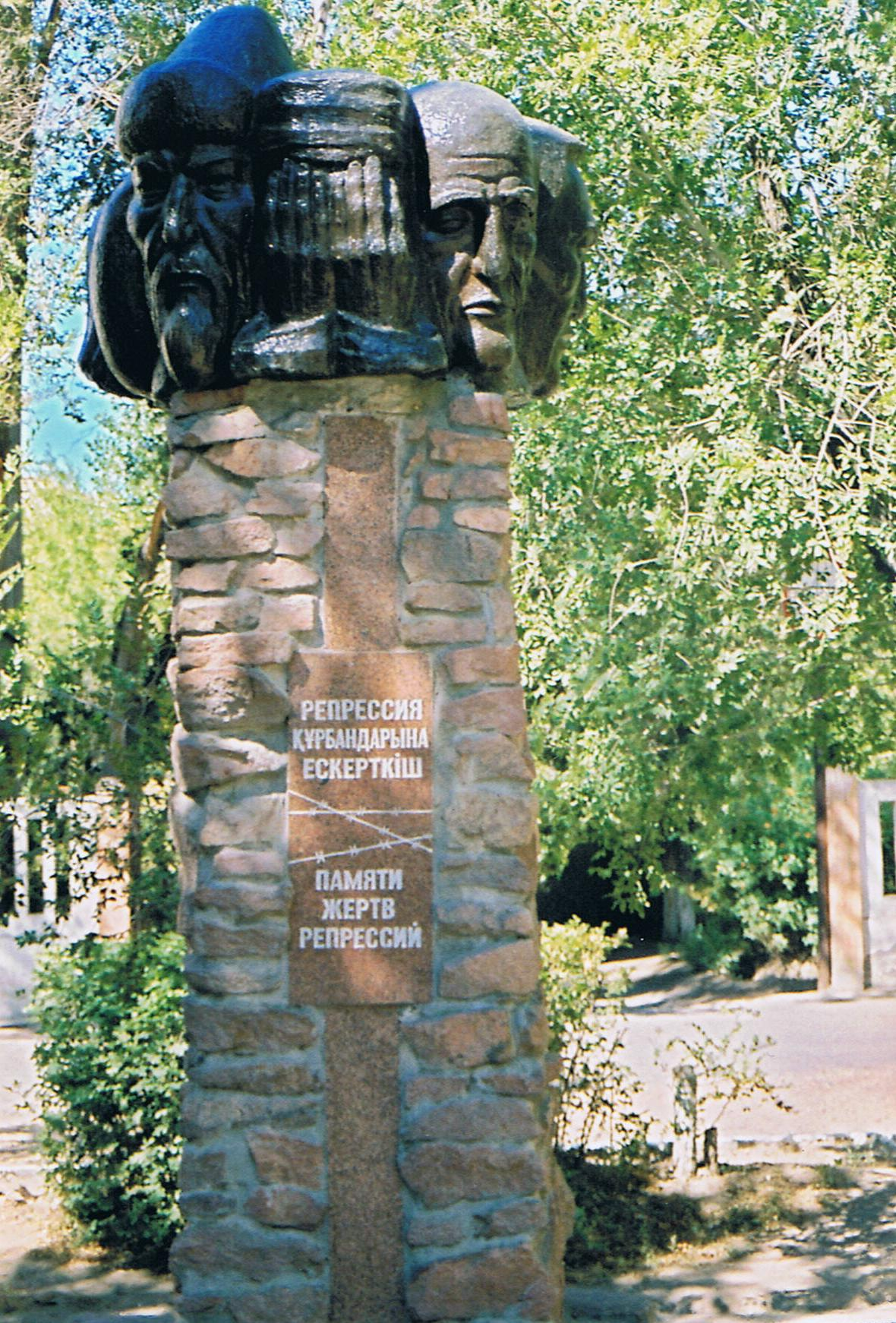
Monument to victims of reprisals.

== Akim of Balkhash town ==
Previously, this position was held by Alexander Agliulin. He voluntarily went to the post of akim of Balkhash town. Press Secretary Marina Shapovalova stated on social media: "Erlan Koshanov presented the new head of the city. It was the Taurbekov Oraz. Prior to the appointment, he headed the Department of economy".

== See also ==
- Balkhash Airport
- Balkhashtsvetmet
- Lake Balkhash
