= Kazakhmys =

Kazakhstani mining company

Kazakhmys Holding
- Type: Private Company
- Industry: Metallurgy; Mining industry
- Founded: 1992
- Headquarters: Kazakhstan: Karaganda, Abaya str., 12
- Key people: Vladimir Kim, President; Nurakhmet Nuriev, CEO
- Products: Cathode copper, gold in ingots, silver in granules, copper wire rod, zinc in concentrate
- Revenue: 883.475 million tenge (2020); 718.087 million tenge (2019)
- Operating income: 168,302 million tenge (2020); 103,817 million tenge (2019)
- Net income: 115.422 million tenge (2020); 63.907 million tenge (2019)
- Number of employees: About 37,000 people (2020)
- Parent: 99.1% of the company's shares belong to the organization Kazakhmys Copper JSC, registered in the Republic of Kazakhstan. The ultimate parent organization of the Company is East Copper Holdings Private Limited, registered in the Republic of Singapore.
- Subsidiaries: Kazakhmys Energy, Kazakhmys Distribution, Kazakhmys Smelting LLP, Kazakhmys Distribution LLP, Kazakhmys Maintenance Services LLP, Kazakhmys Energy LLP, KAZ GREEN ENERGY LLP, HYDRO POWER PLANT TOPAR LLP, Kazakhmys Coal LLP, Kazakhmys Barlau LLP, "Maker (Maker)" LLP, "Kazphosphate" LLP
- Website: www.mykazakhmys.kz

Kazakhmys is a vertically integrated holding company whose key assets are concentrated in the mining industry and non-ferrous metallurgy. It was established and registered as a joint-stock company in August 1997, and was re-registered as a limited liability partnership on 14 January 2005. In October 2014, Kazakhmys PLC was divided into the private Kazakhmys Corporation LLP (owner of the Zhomart Mine) and the public KAZ Minerals Plc, with Vladimir Kim retaining control of both entities.

== History ==
Mining activity in the region dates back to the early 20th century. In 1913, the Spassky Joint Stock Company was registered in Zhezkazgan under the leadership of British businessman Leslie Urquhart. Following the October Revolution, the company was nationalized in the 1920s.

In April 1931, the industrial entity known as Balkhashmet was established. Copper smelting operations began in Balkhash in 1938, and in 1943 the BMZ plant commenced operations in Zhezkazgan.

Kazakhmys itself was formally established in 1992. After its registration as a joint-stock company in 1997, it transitioned into a limited liability partnership in 2005. In 2014, the company was split into Kazakhmys Corporation LLP and KAZ Minerals Plc.

== Operations ==
Kazakhmys ranks 20th globally in copper concentrate production (271,000 tons) and 12th in rough and cathode copper production (377,000 and 365,000 tons respectively, including processed raw materials).

In 2020, Kazakhmys contributed to Kazakhstan’s 11th-place global ranking in silver production (279 tons, accounting for 51% of the country’s output). The Group also ranked third nationally in electricity generation, with a production volume of 7,267.53 million kWh.

Kazakhmys Group operates 13 mines (10 underground and 3 open-pit), six processing plants, and two copper smelting plants (Zhezkazgan and Balkhash), one of which is undergoing reconstruction. It also owns three power plants (GRES Topar LLP, Zhezkazgan, and Balkhash thermal power plants) and one coal mine operated by Kazakhmys Coal LLP.

In 2020, the Group mined 28.655 million tons of ore, achieving 100.76% of its production plan. The average copper content of the ore was 1% (compared to a planned 0.94%). In total, 31.3 million tons of ore were processed by Kazakhmys plants that year.

== Ownership and management ==
The Group is ultimately controlled by Vladimir Kim, who holds a 70% ownership stake. Eduard Ogay owns the remaining 30%.

The company’s President is Vladimir Kim, while the Chief Executive Officer is Nurakhmet Nuriev.
