= The Glasshouse, Gateshead =

Music performance and education centre in Gateshead, England

The Glasshouse

- The venue, viewed from the River Tyne
- Interactive map of The Glasshouse
- Full name: The Glasshouse International Centre for Music
- Former names: The Sage Gateshead, Sage Gateshead
- Location: Gateshead Quayside, United Kingdom
- Coordinates: 54.9677°N 1.6020°W
- Capacity: 1,640 (Sage One); 600 (Sage Two); 2,240 (Total)
- Type: Concert venue, centre for musical education

Construction
- Opened: 17 December 2004
- Cost: £70 million

Website
- theglasshouseicm.org

The Glasshouse is an international centre for musical education and concerts on the Gateshead bank of Quayside in northern England. Opened in 2004 as Sage Gateshead, still known locally by that name and occupied by North Music Trust, the venue's original name honours a patron: the accountancy software company The Sage Group.

== History ==
Planning for the centre began in the early 1990s, when the orchestra of Sage Gateshead, Royal Northern Sinfonia, with encouragement from Northern Arts, began working on plans for a new concert hall. They were soon joined by regional folk music development agency Folkworks, which ensured that the needs of the region's traditional music were taken into consideration and represented in Sage Gateshead's programme of concerts, alongside Rock, Pop, Dance, Hip Hop, classical, jazz, acoustic, indie, country and world, Practice spaces for professional musicians, students and amateurs were an important part of the provision.

The planning and construction process cost over £70 million, which was raised primarily through National Lottery grants. The contractor was Laing O'Rourke. The centre has a range of patrons, notably Sage Group which contributed a large sum of money to have the building named after it. Sage plc has helped support the charitable activities of Sage Gateshead since its conception. The venue opened over the weekend 17–19 December 2004.

Sage Gateshead was developed by Foster and Partners following an architectural design competition launched in 1997 and managed by RIBA Competitions. Over 100 architects registered their interest and 12 – a mixture of local, national and international talent – were invited to prepare concept designs. A shortlist of six was then interviewed with Foster and Partners unanimously selected as the winner. The Design has gone on to win a number of awards: the RIBA Inclusive Design Award, Civic Trust Award and The Journal North East Landmark of the Year Award.

As a conference venue, the building hosted the Labour Party's Spring conference in February 2005 and the Liberal Democrat Party conference in March 2012. On 18 August 2009, Sage Gateshead was selected to host the 2010 and 2011 National Union of Students annual conference. The 2010 Annual Conference took place 13–15 April 2010. It also hosts accessible learning courses for all ages and its constant interaction with local schools and academies through programmes such as Sing Up and the option of school visits.

In 2022 The Sage Group announced that they were also sponsoring a new development that is being built next to Sage Gateshead which will be called The Sage. Sage Gateshead announced that they will be finding a new name for the venue prior to The Sage opening in 2024. On 13 September 2023 the venue announced its new name, The Glasshouse International Centre for Music.

In 2025, Abigail Pogson left her position as CEO of The Glasshouse after ten years to become CEO of the Barbican Centre.

== Building ==
Former logo prior to name change

The centre occupies a curved glass and stainless steel building designed by Foster + Partners, Buro Happold (structural engineering), Mott MacDonald (engineering consultants) and Arup (acoustics), with views of Newcastle and Gateshead Quaysides, the Tyne Bridge and the Gateshead Millennium Bridge.

The Glasshouse contains three performance spaces; a 1,700-seater, a 450-seater, and a smaller rehearsal and performance hall, the Northern Rock Foundation Hall. The rest of the building was designed around these three spaces to allow for maximum attention to detail in their acoustic properties. Structurally it is three separate buildings, insulated from each other to prevent noise and vibration travelling between them. The gaps between them may be seen as one walks around inside. A special 'spongy' concrete mix was used in the construction, with a higher-than-usual air capacity to improve the acoustic. These three buildings are enclosed (but not touched) by the now-famous glass and steel shell. Sage One was intended as an acoustically perfect space, modelled on the Musikverein in Vienna. Its ceiling panels may be raised and lowered and curtains drawn across the ribbed wooden side walls, changing the sound profile of the room to suit any type of music. Sage Two is a smaller venue, possibly the world's only ten-sided performance space.

The building is open to the public throughout the day.

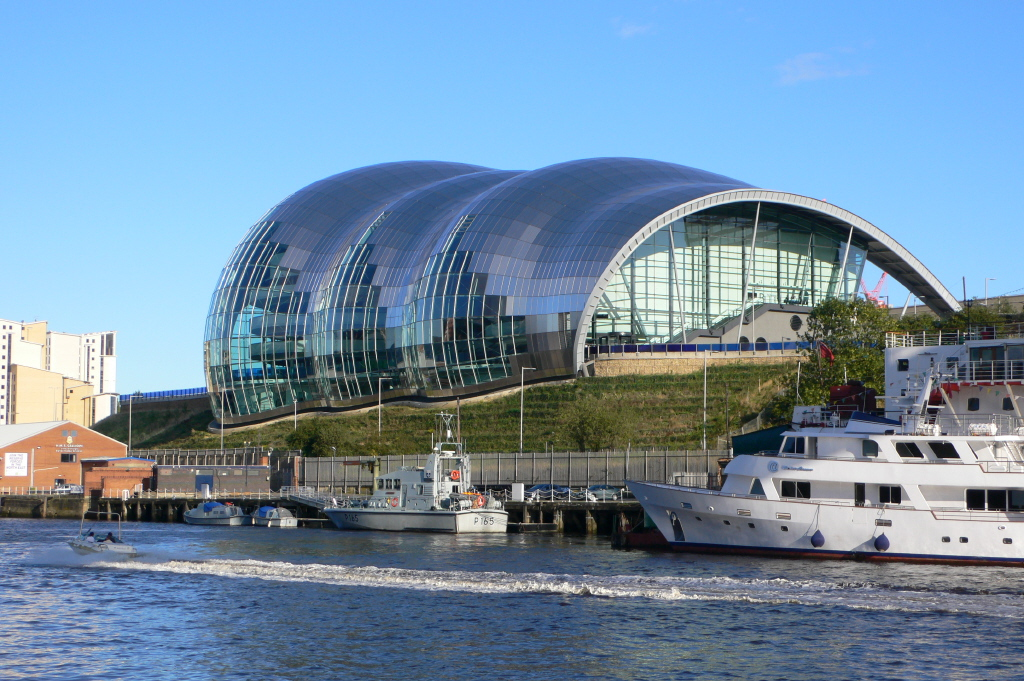
The Glasshouse, viewed from Newcastle

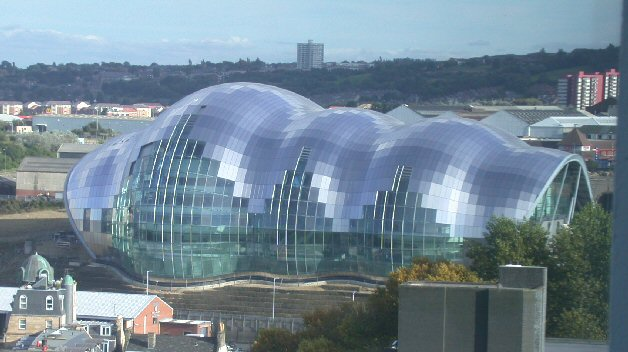
The Glasshouse, viewed from Newcastle

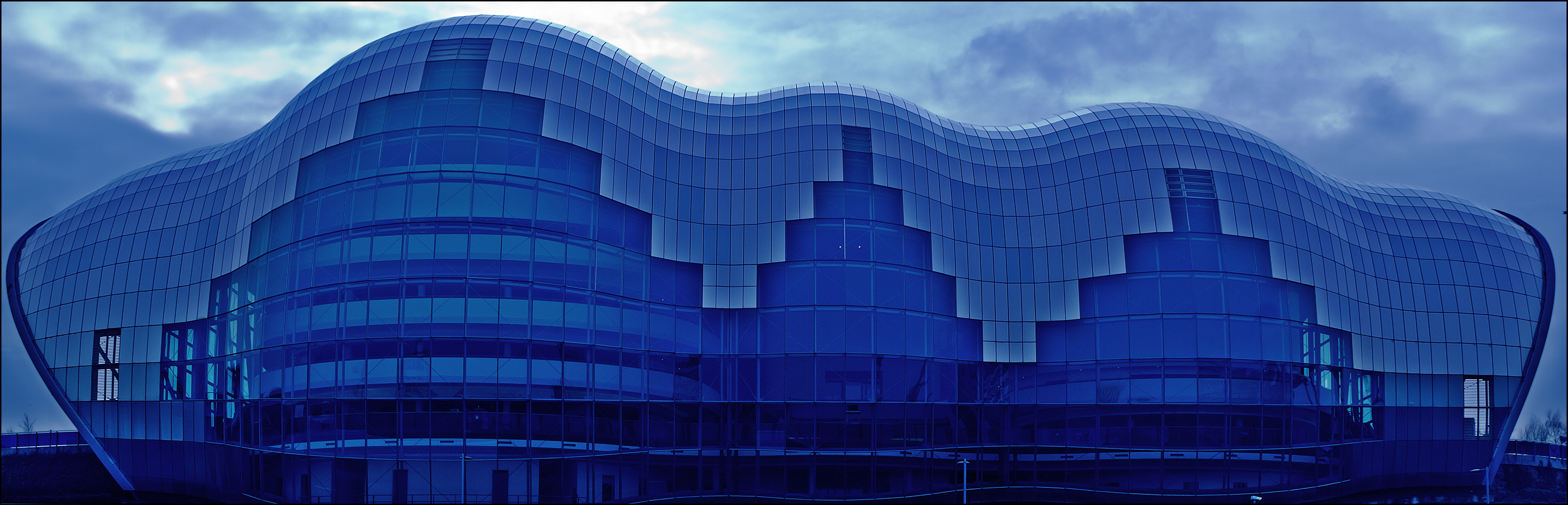
Dim-lit lateral view of the building

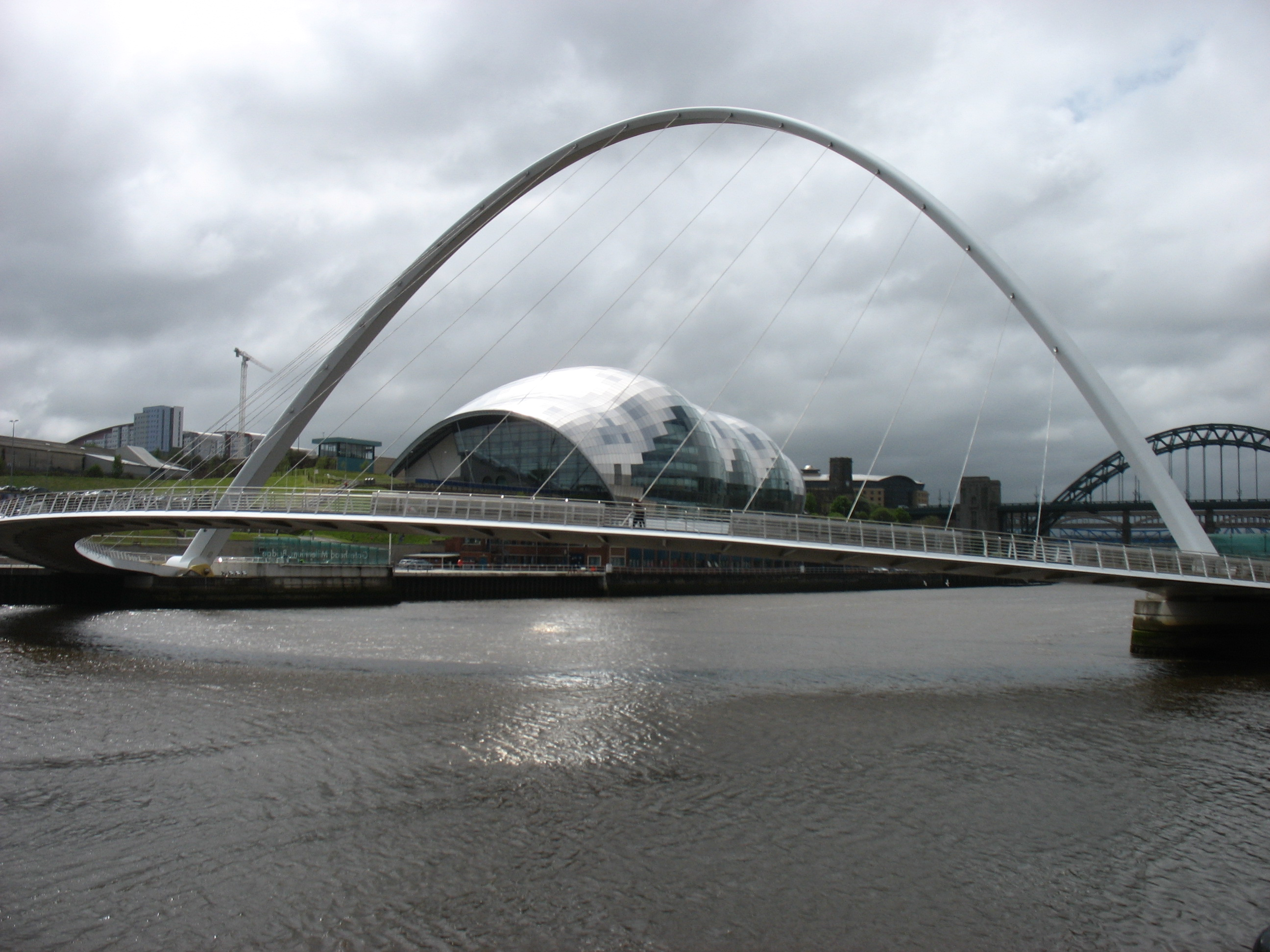
Gateshead Millennium Bridge

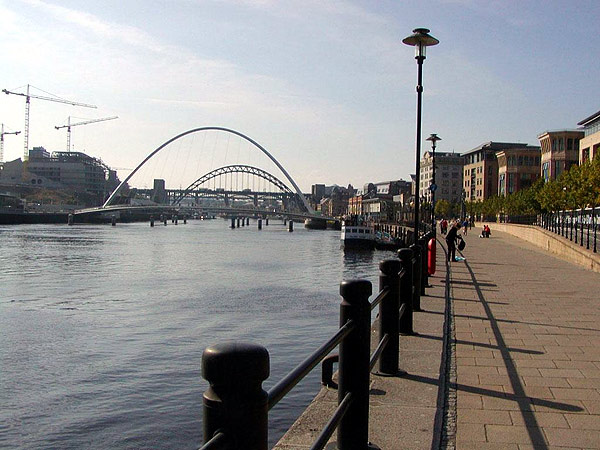
Sage Gateshead under construction and its position on the quayside

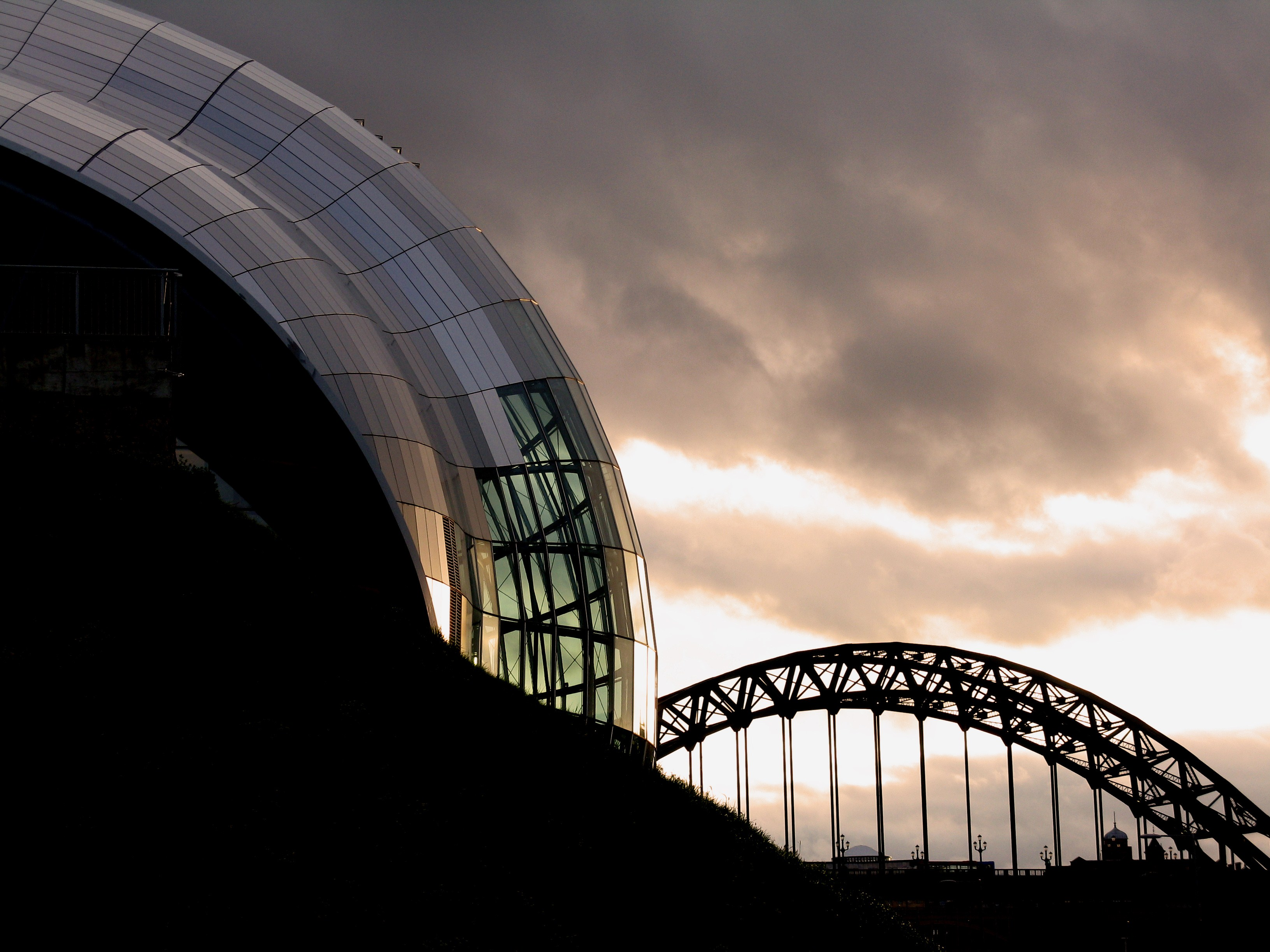
The Glasshouse and the Tyne bridge

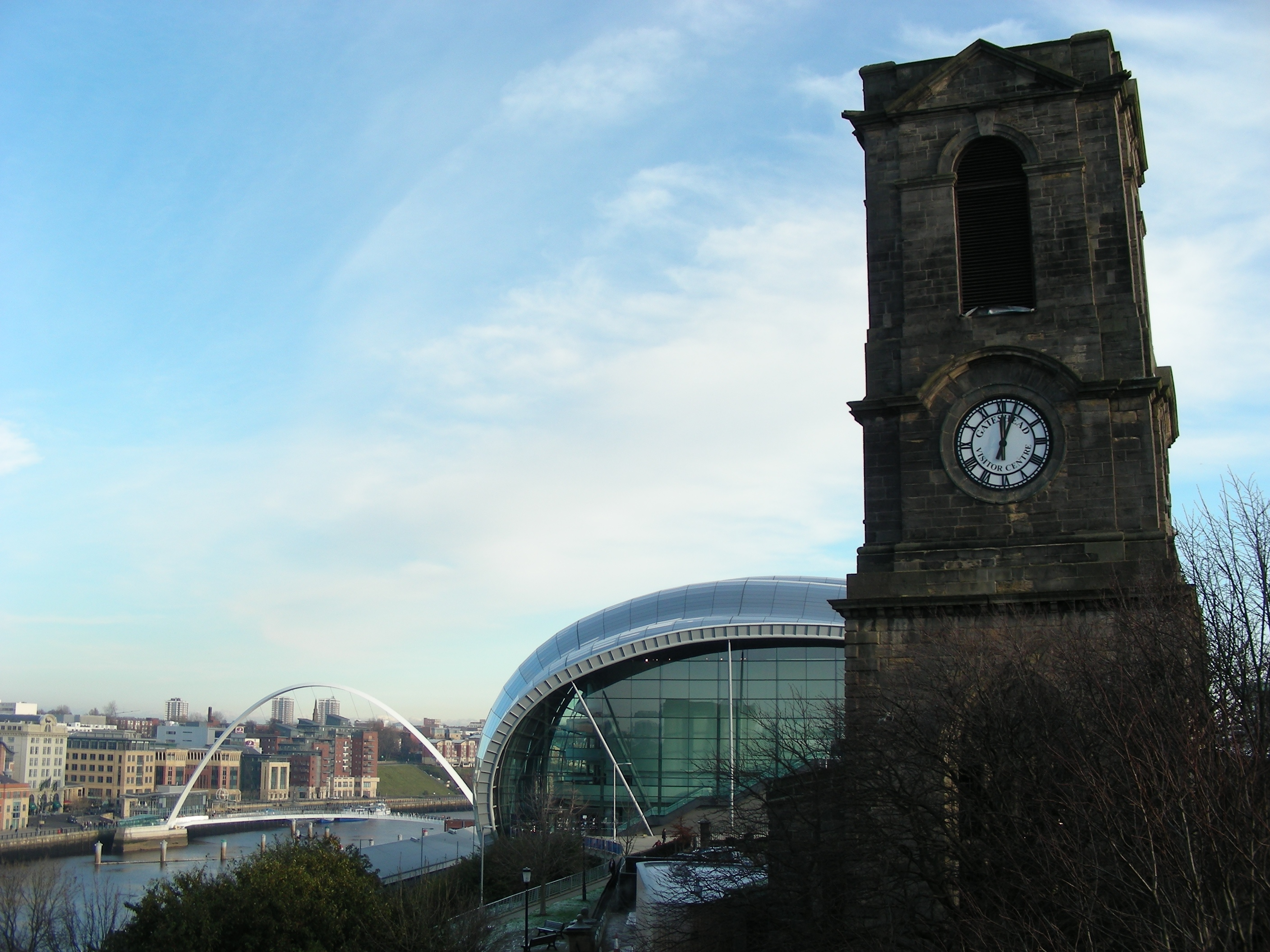
St Mary’s Church, Gateshead, now a museum, in front of the Glasshouse

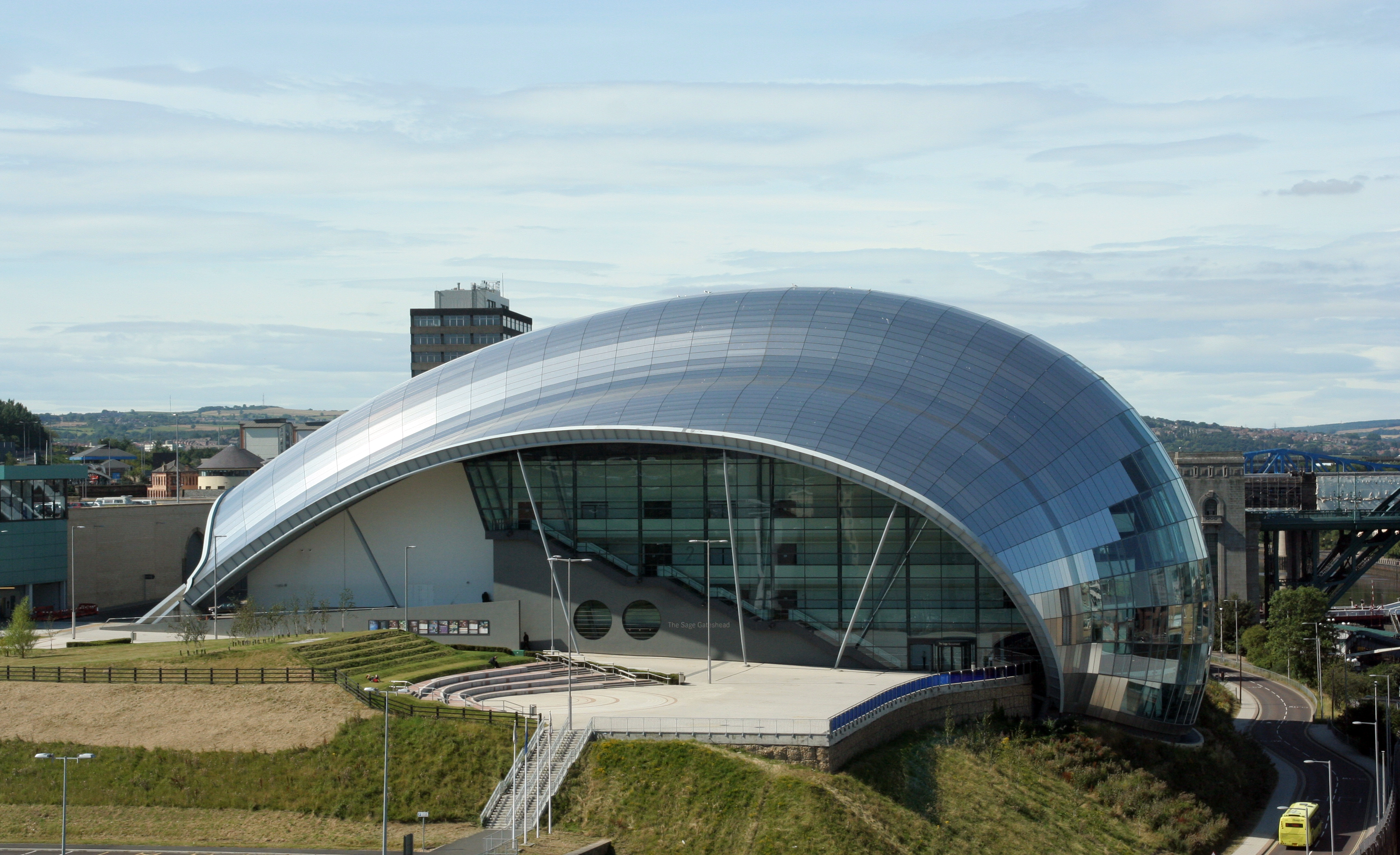
Entrance

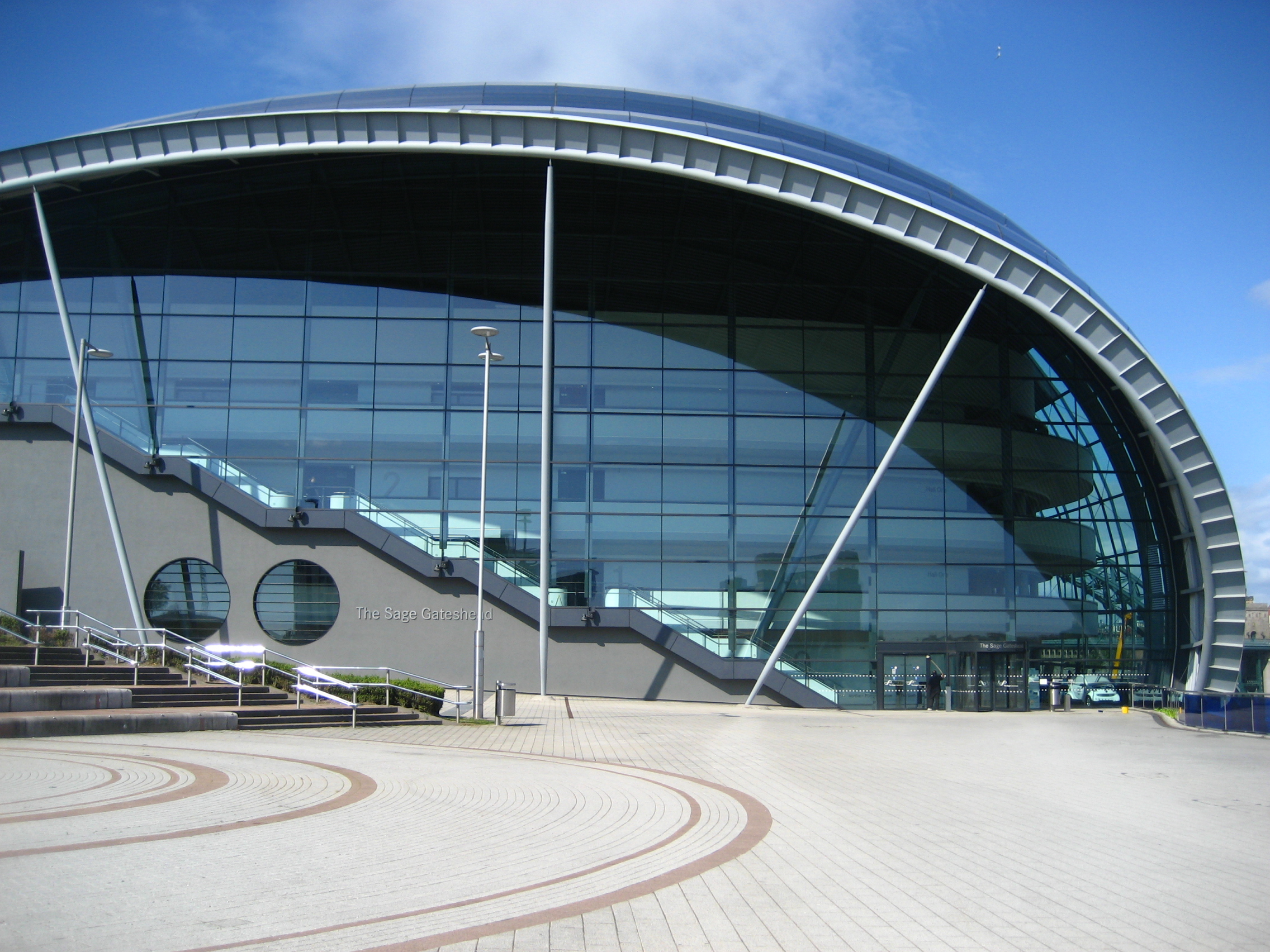
Closeup of entrance

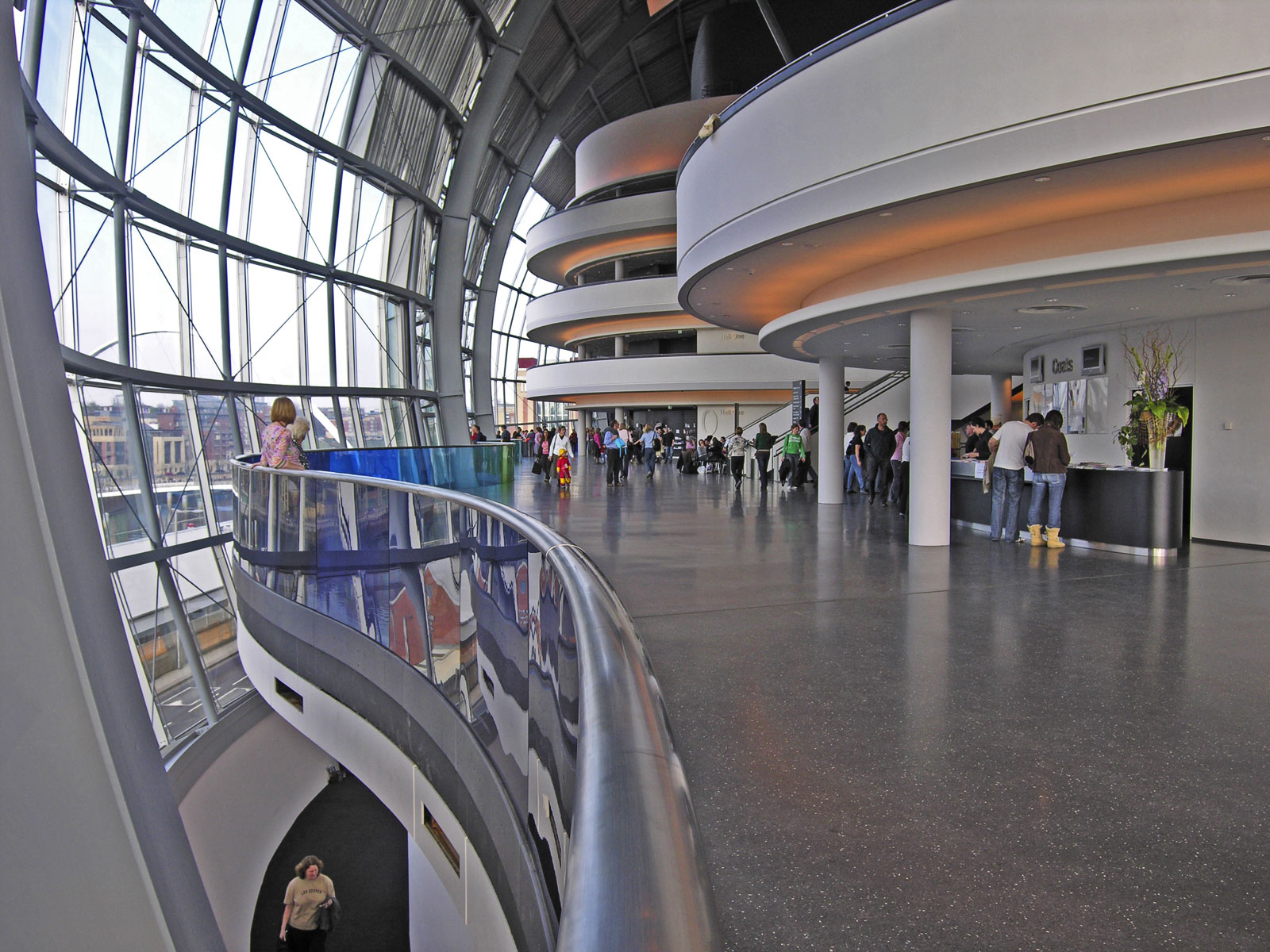
Interior view

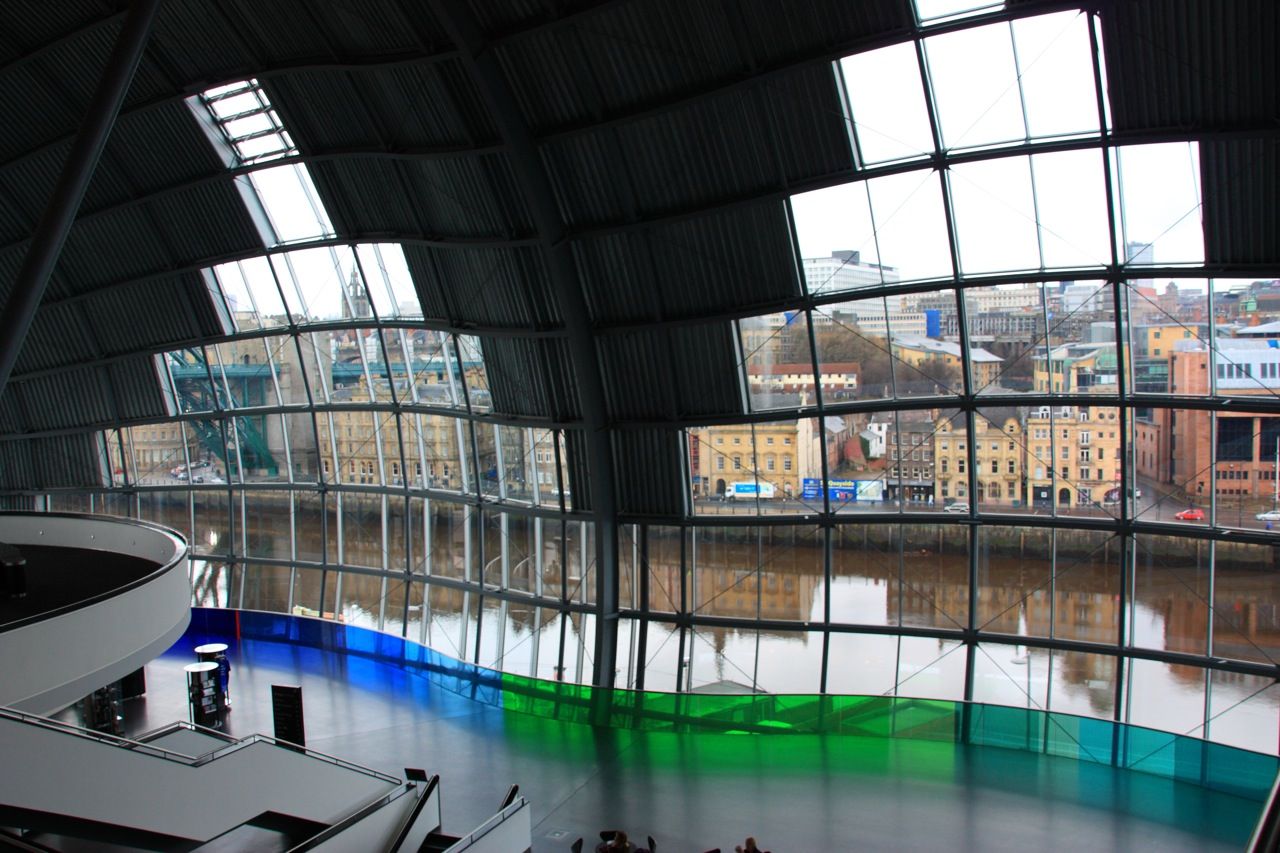
Interior view

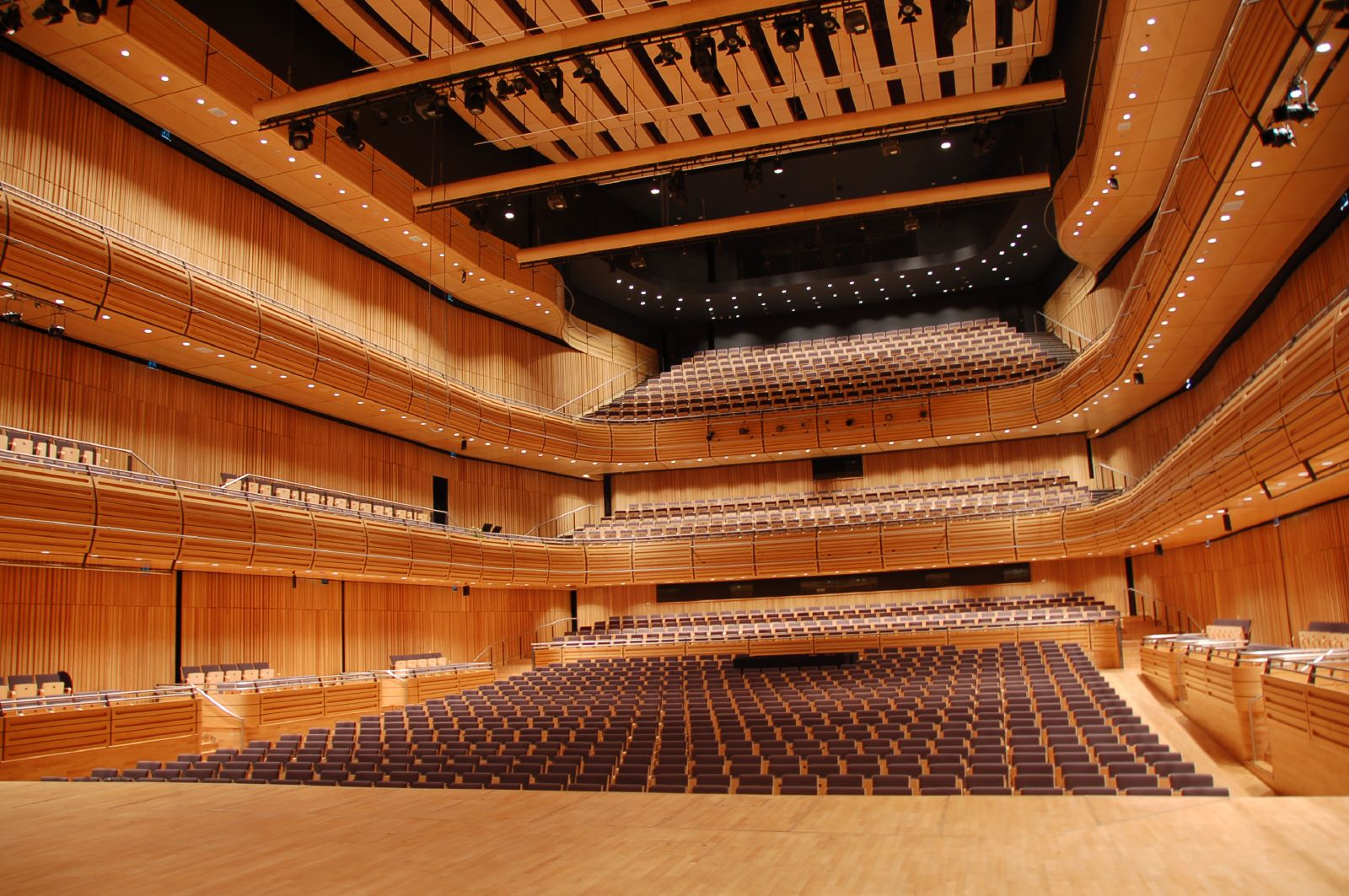
The interior of Sage One

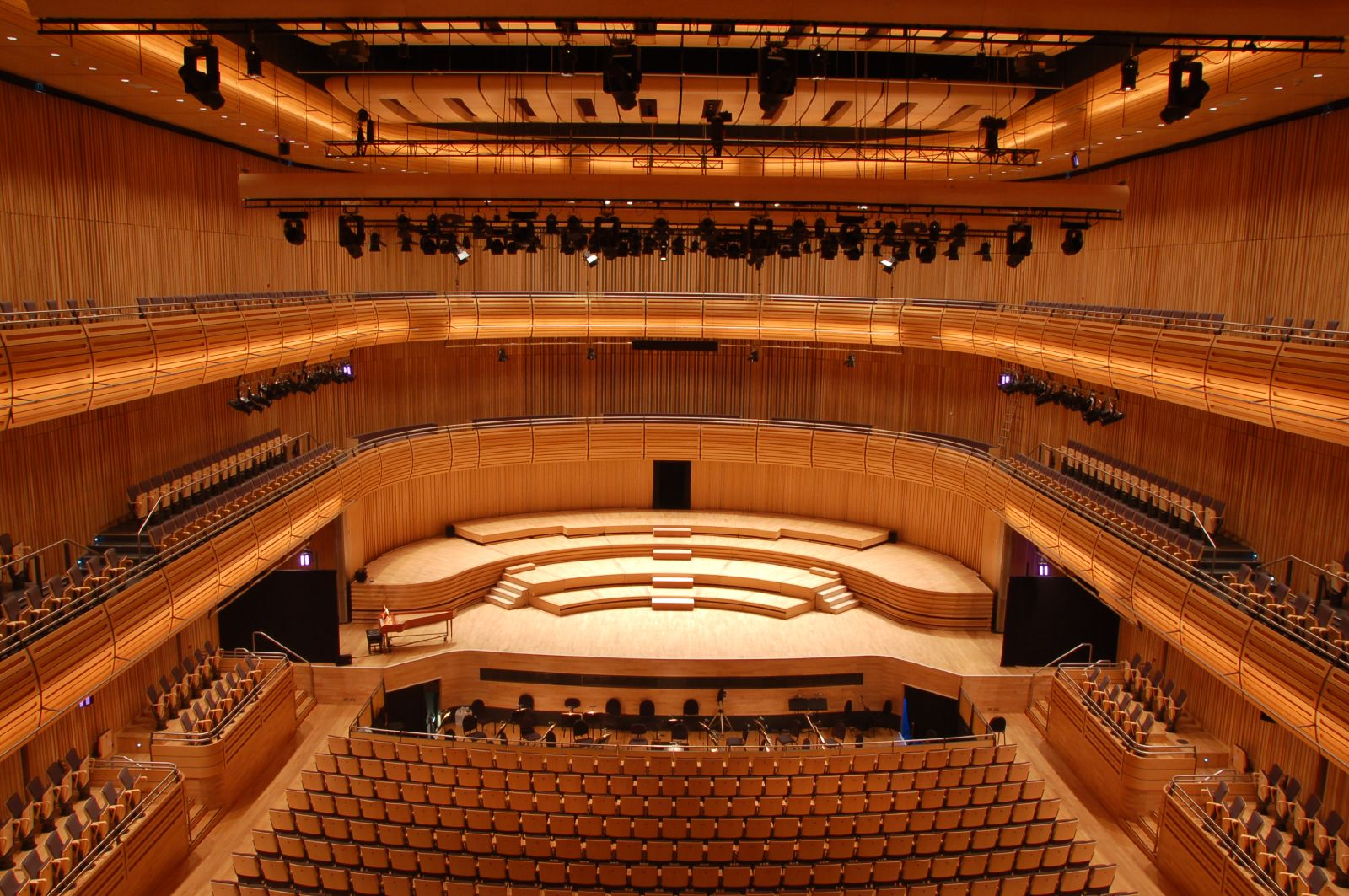
Opposite view of the interior of Sage One

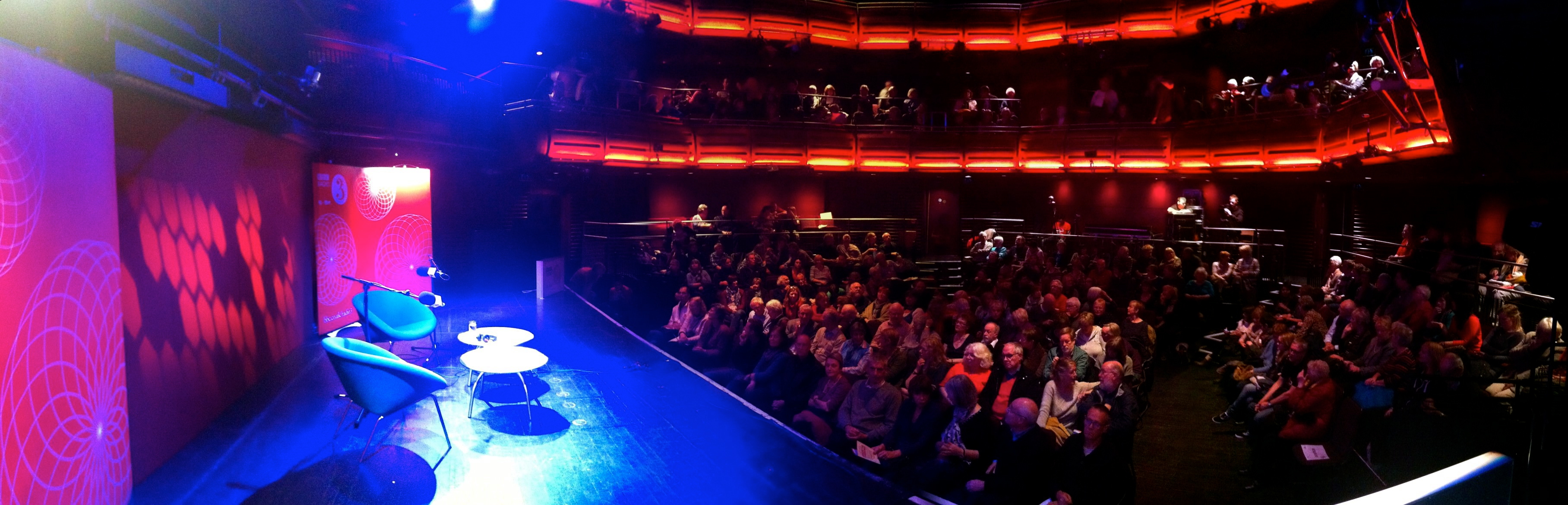
Sage Two

== Concerts ==
The Glasshouse hosts concerts from a wide range of internationally famous artists, and those who have played at the venue include Above and Beyond, Blondie, James Brown, Bonobo, Andy Cutting, De La Soul, Nick Cave, George Clinton, Bill Callahan, Crosby, Stills & Nash, Dillinger, Grace Jones, Gretchen Peters, Elbow, Explosions in the Sky, the Fall, Herbie Hancock, Mogwai, Morrissey, Marillion, Mumford & Sons, OMD, Pet Shop Boys, Sunn O))), Nancy Sinatra, Snarky Puppy, Sting, Yellowman, Shane Filan of Westlife and others. In February 2015, it was one of the hosts of the second annual BBC Radio 6 Music Festival.

It is also home to Royal Northern Sinfonia, of which The Guardian wrote there is "no better chamber orchestra in Britain", and frequently hosts other visiting orchestras from around the world. Until 2020, the music director for Royal Northern Sinfonia was the pianist and conductor Lars Vogt. In late 2014, Royal Northern Sinfonia collaborated with John Grant, performing at Sage Gateshead, and other venues throughout the UK. Recordings from this tour were made available as a limited edition CD and 12" record via Rough Trade Records in 2015.

== Awards ==
- 2019: UK National Lottery 25th Birthday Award - Best Arts, Culture and Film
- 2019: Julie's Bicycle Creative Green 2 Star
- 2019: Gold Standard - Attitude is Everything
- 2018: Gold Award for Inclusive Tourism (North East Tourism Awards)
- 2018: Gold Award for Business Tourism (Visit England Awards for Excellence)
- 2005: Local Authority Building of the Year
- 2005: British Construction Industry Awards
- 2005: RIBA Award for Inclusive Design

== See also ==
- Gateshead Millennium Bridge
- Foster and Partners
