= Akmaral Zykayeva =

Kazakh composer, singer-songwriter, actress

- Ақмарал Зықаева
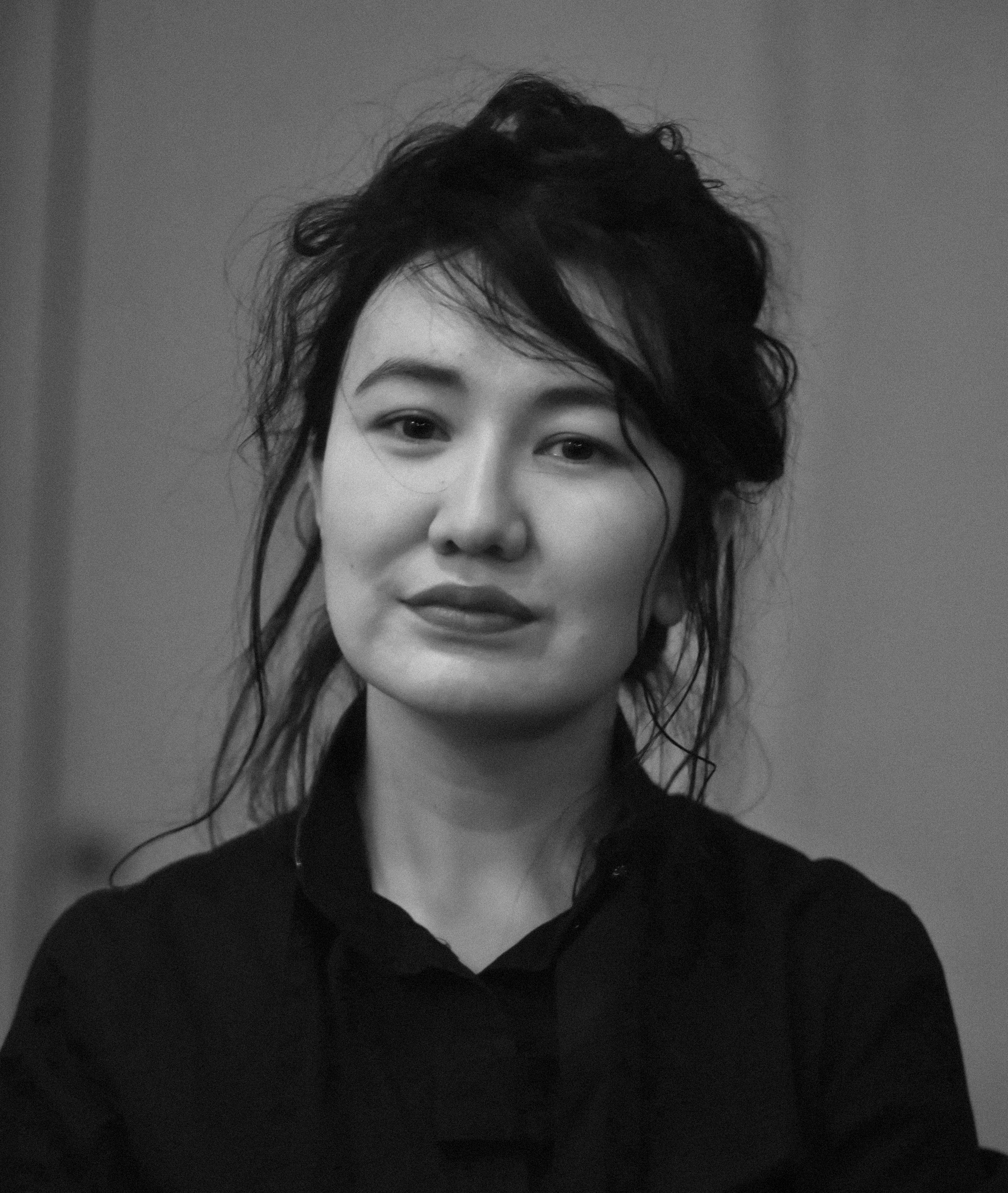
- Zykayeva in 2018
- Born: 21 December 1985 (age 40)
- Other name: Mergen
- Occupations: Singer; actress
- Years active: 2009–present
- Website: mergenmusic.space

Aqmaral Ūlanqyzy Zyqaeva (Note: Often transliterated as Akmaral Ulankyzy Zykayeva through a Russified Romanization of Акмарал Уланкызы Зыкаева.) (Kazakh: Ақмарал Ұланқызы Зықаева; born 21 December 1985), better known by the stage name Mergen, is a Kazakh composer, singer-songwriter, multi-instrumentalist, sound producer, an actress.

== Biography ==
=== Early life and education ===
Born and raised in Almaty, Kazakhstan, Zykayeva began formal music training at the age of six, studying violin as her primary instrument alongside piano. She later pursued studies in Information Technology at Satbayev Kazakh National Technical University. As a classically-trained violinist she performed with the National Youth Symphony and appeared at prestigious venues including the Konzerthaus Berlin and London’s Barbican.

=== Recording and artistic projects ===
Zykayeva first released music under the moniker “Mergen,” issuing her debut album 13 in 2009, followed by Ayan in 2011. The latter was developed in the course of her studies at MI (Musicians Institute) where it was awarded an “Outstanding Project” distinction.

In 2012 she joined Kazakhstan’s Kazakhfilm Studios as a post-production sound engineer. From 2012 to 2013, she headed the Bilim Media Group recording studios, producing audio content for animation, television and educational documentaries.

A significant project of this period was Qazaq Lounge (c. 2013), a collaborative album produced with more than forty contributors (vocalists, producers, musicians). According to its Bandcamp page, the album presents reinterpretations of pre-Soviet Kazakh folk songs, blending them with electronic, jazz and classical influences, and was produced and arranged by Zykayeva.

Another media profile noted that the project “represented classical Kazakh musical standards in her own interpretation.”

In 2015, she released an orchestral-cinematic EP under her real name, performing most of the violin parts herself. She also undertook commissioned sound-work for international events (including projects tied to London Fashion Week and the Red Cross/Red Crescent) and taught vocal and composition classes In 2017, she released the album Tūn, dedicated to her grandfather.

=== Film scoring and screen work ===
From 2018–2019, Zykayeva composed the score for The Horse Thieves. Roads of Time (dir. Yerlan Nurmukhambetov & Lisa Takeba), which opened the 2019 Busan International Film Festival. She also contributed music to Kim Ki-duk’s feature Dissolve (2019), and participated in the British Council’s Envision Sound residency at the Dovzhenko Center in Kyiv.

In 2020, Zykayeva was selected for Berlinale Talents and appeared as the lead in Zhannat Alshanova’s short History of Civilization, which won the Pardino d’argento (Silver Leopard) in Locarno’s Pardi di Domani competition. In 2021 she acted in the short Qus (dir. Begaly Shibekeyev), receiving the Best Actress award at the Baikonur International Film Festival.

In 2022, Zykayeva composed the score for Qas (dir. Aisultan Seit), later earning a nomination for Best Original Music at the 17th Asian Film Awards (2024). The film premiered internationally in 2023 at the Shanghai International Film Festival, where director Aisultan Seit won Best Director in the Asian New Talent section.

In 2024, she scored Crickets, It’s Your Turn (dir. Olga Korotko), which premiered in Locarno’s Concorso Cineasti del Presente and was subsequently selected for the Helsinki International Film Festival – Love & Anarchy and competed in the Feature Narrative Competition at the El Gouna Film Festival. That same year she composed the score for Alina Mustafina’s feature documentary Gingerbread for Her Dad, which premiered in Busan’s Wide Angle Documentary Competition program and later screened at the Torino Film Festival. Zykayeva also scored Abel (dir. Elzat Eskendir), which competed in Busan’s New Currents section (2024), had its European premiere at the Göteborg Film Festival (2025), and won the Grand Jury Award at the Vesoul International Film Festival of Asian Cinema (2025).

In 2025, the animated short Son (dir. Zhanna Bekmambetova), on which Zykayeva worked as co-composer, won Best Animated Short Film at the 27th Shanghai International Film Festival (Golden Goblet Awards). That year she also collaborated with director Zhanana Kurmasheva on two documentaries: We Live Here — world premiered at CPH:DOX (DOX:AWARD) and subsequently screened at Hot Docs and DOK.fest München (DOK.horizonte) — and Atomic Secrets for The Guardian, which follows Chornobyl scientist Dmitry Kalmykov as he investigates radioactive contamination at Kazakhstan’s former Semipalatinsk nuclear test site.

=== Awards and nominations ===
Akmaral’s notable distinctions include the Best Animated Short Film award at the Golden Goblet Awards (Shanghai International Film Festival, 2025) for Son (as co-composer); the Grand Jury Award at the Vesoul International Film Festival of Asian Cinema (2025) for Abel; and a nomination for Best Original Music at the 17th Asian Film Awards (2024) for Qas.

== Discography ==
- 13 (2009)
- Ayan (2011)
- Qazaq Lounge (2013)
- Mise en scène (2015)
- Tūn (2017)
- Tales of Mergen (2020)
- Qas — Original Motion Picture Soundtrack (2023)(2015)
