= Centre for Music, London =

Centre for Music

General information
- Status: Proposed
- Type: Concert hall
- Location: City of London
- Country: United Kingdom
- Coordinates: 51°31′03.74″N 0°05′48.51″W

Design and construction
- Architecture firm: Diller Scofidio + Renfro

Other information
- Seating capacity: 2000

The Centre for Music was a proposed concert hall in the City of London. The City announced on 18 February 2021 that the project would not be progressed.

The plans included a 2000-seat, "world-class" auditorium, as well as other performance spaces, rehearsal rooms, education facilities, and four storeys of commercial space. The proposed site was occupied by the Museum of London, which was due to move to Smithfield Market as part of a separate redevelopment plan. The building would have been the new home of the London Symphony Orchestra (LSO), and would also have been used by the Guildhall School of Music and Drama. It would have been run by the Barbican Centre.

The estimated cost of £288m to build the centre would have needed to be raised entirely from private donations. The construction time was estimated at four years.

== History ==
Campaigning for the hall began in 2015 when Sir Simon Rattle, then considering joining the LSO as music director, said in an interview that London's concert halls were not up to international standards. Rattle would later be appointed the LSO's music director.

After meeting with Rattle, Chancellor of the Exchequer George Osborne ordered a feasibility study for a new London concert hall, and committed £5.5 million to fund the development of a business case.

In late 2015 the City of London Corporation agreed in principle to make the site available when the Museum of London moves to West Smithfield.

In 2016 central government funding was withdrawn on the grounds that it did not offer value for money.

The City of London Corporation then provided £2.5 million to establish a business case for the project, which was submitted in December 2018, and a further £2.49 million to continue the project’s development in 2019. Concept designs by New York-based architects Diller Scofidio + Renfro were made public in January 2019.

In March 2020 the City of London Corporation approved the spending of a further £1.95 million to enable work on the proposals to continue, taking expenditure up to £6.8 million.

In January 2021, Rattle announced he was leaving the LSO for the Bavarian Radio Symphony Orchestra for personal reasons. The next month it was announced that the project would not be progressed. Martin Kettle of The Guardian wrote that "it was hard not to see it as an elite project" and that the Centre had been "a tough and questionable sell from the start".
