= The Sage =

Planned development in Gateshead, Tyne and Wear

- Rendering of the proposed venue
- Interactive map of The Sage
- Location: Gateshead Quays, United Kingdom
- Coordinates: 54.9675°N 1.6000°W
- Operator: ASM Global
- Capacity: 12,500 (Sage Arena)
- Type: Indoor arena, conference centre

Construction
- Cost: £350 million
- Architect: HOK

Website
- thesage.co.uk

The Sage is a forthcoming indoor arena and conference centre in Gateshead, United Kingdom. It was originally due to open, in two phases, between 2025 and 2027. The site is located between The Glasshouse and BALTIC centres on Gateshead Quayside. As of 2026, construction work still has yet to commence.

If built, the Sage Arena will replace the nearby 11,000 capacity Newcastle Arena that was originally opened in 1995.

== Name and history ==
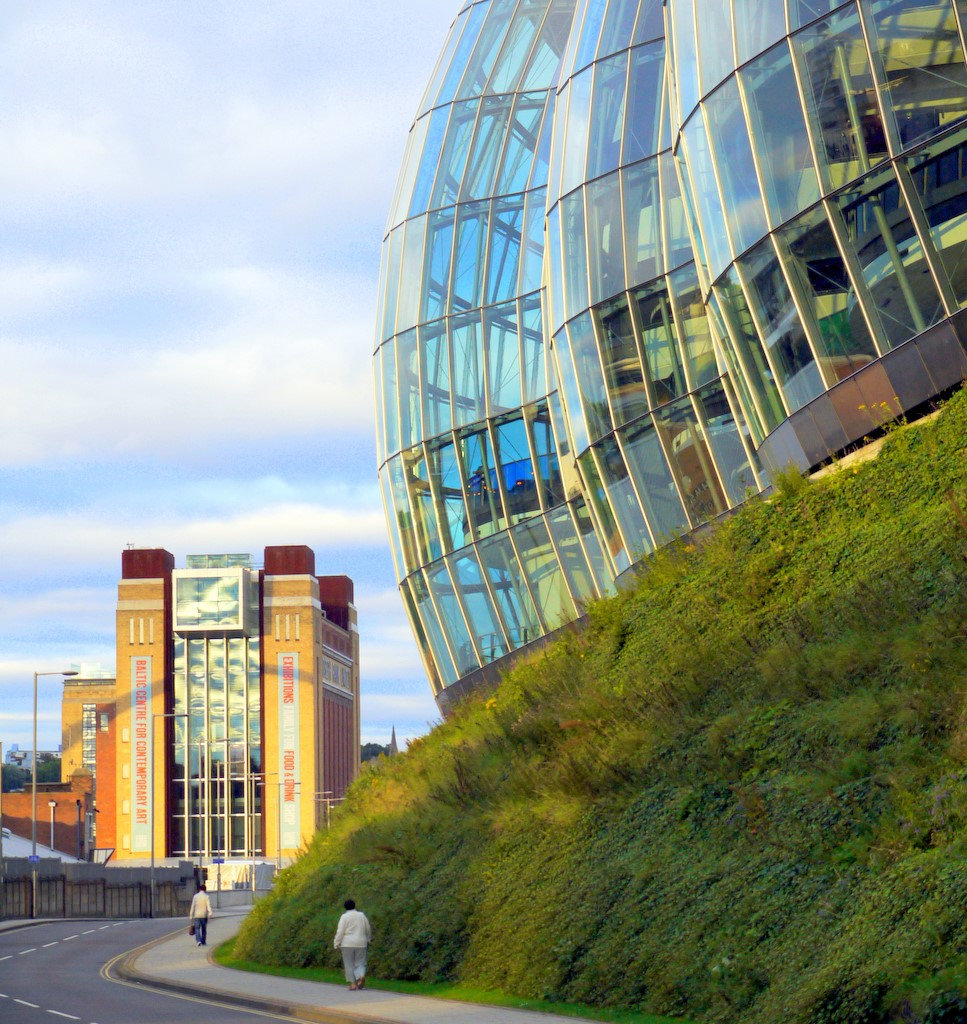
The Sage will be located in the current vacant space between Sage Gateshead and Baltic (both pictured).

The venue is named for The Sage Group, a British multinational enterprise software company based in Newcastle upon Tyne, who agreed a £10 million deal for the naming rights. As of 2022 the Sage Group are currently patrons of the next-door Sage Gateshead venue which announced that they will be finding a new name for the 2004 building, which is now The Glasshouse International Centre for Music.

Gateshead Council announced plans to redevelop the vacant site in 2014 and at that time the aim was for a mixed use development. The development is likely to cost in excess of £350 million. Preparatory works on the site began in late 2021. £20 million was secured from the UK Government's Levelling Up Fund in 2023. Construction work was expected to start in Spring 2024.

HOK are the architects of the complex and it is a joint venture between developer Ask Real Estate and investment manager Patrizia AG. The 54,500 square metres (587,000 sq ft) complex will be operated by ASM Global who currently operate the nearby Utilita Arena Newcastle. The conference centre, which is to be built first, was initially due to open in 2025 with the arena following in 2027.

=== Construction progress ===
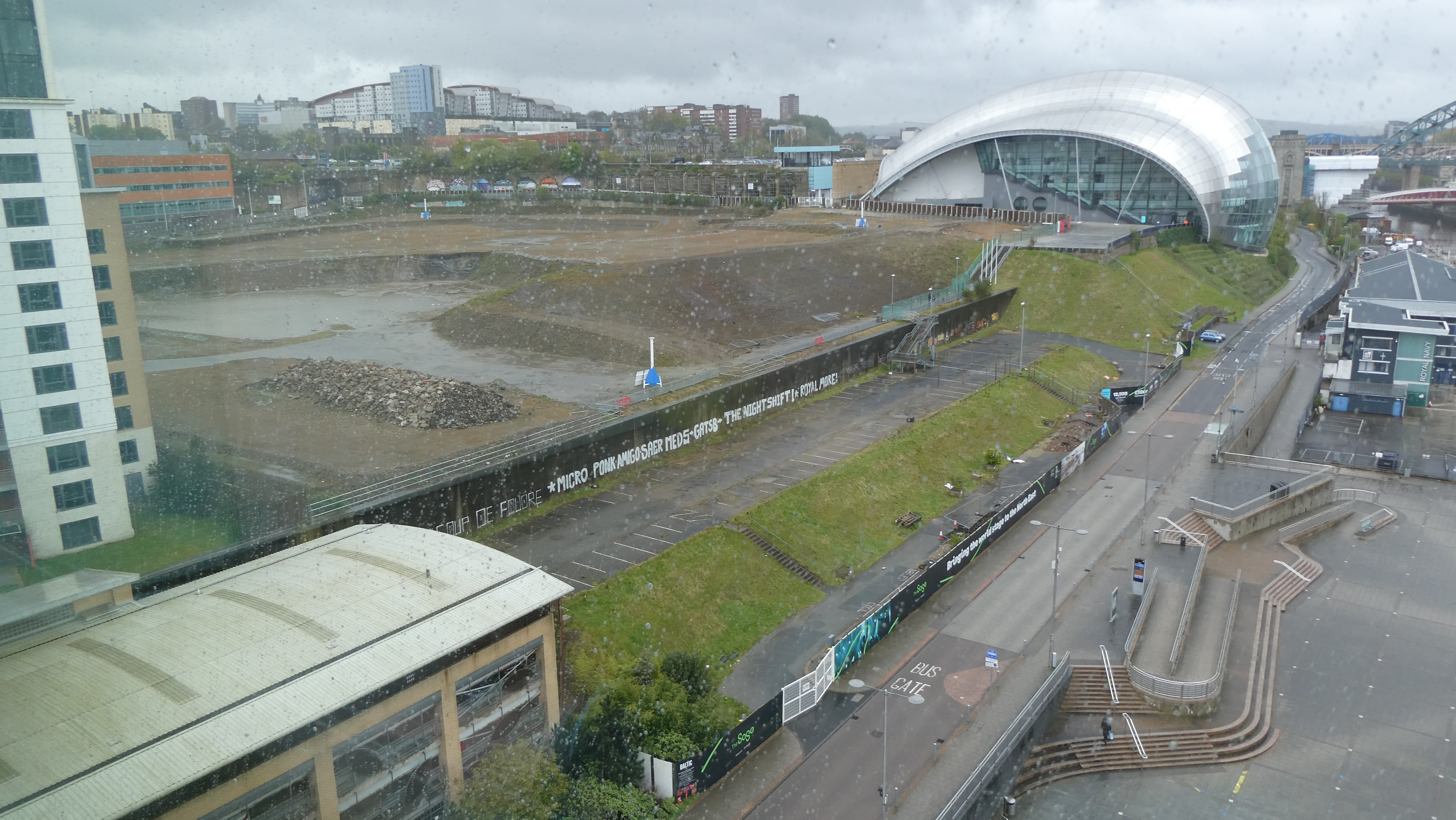
Sage development site between The Glasshouse concert hall and Baltic art centre, as seen from the Baltic in 2024.

In an update regarding the progress of the arena project in November 2024, the local council confirmed they had yet to start construction work and that the estimated cost had risen to more than £350 million. The site has already been cleared for the new development. In January 2025, it was reported that a deal was close to being signed, that would allow construction work to start, and was expected to be announced in the next few weeks. However, in July 2025, it was revealed that progress on the site had stalled due to rising costs and feasibility issues. The future of the project remains unclear; options include downsizing the development to help reduce its required public funding or for the site to instead be used for a mixture of housing, retail, and commercial ventures as originally planned. A decision was expected to be made in early 2026.

In March 2026, it was reported that the project would receive £24 million of investment from the North East Combined Authority. In September 2026, plans were unveiled to create a green linear park, an arrival plaza, and an open-air performance venue at the quayside site. The investment is intended to enhance and prepare the area for future development while authorities continue advancing the main proposal.

== Facilities ==
The site will have two hotels run by the Accor group, an ibis and Novotel, with a total of over 300 rooms.

The Sage Arena will have a capacity of 12,500 and will also have outdoor performance spaces, bars, restaurants and retail outlets. The 6,320 square metres (68,000 sq ft) conference and event space will include 17 conference suites and 2,520 square metres (27,100 sq ft) of adaptable meeting space.

== See also ==
- Newcastle Arena, currently the largest concert venue in North East England
