= Abigail Pogson =

British arts executive

- Born: September 1974 (age 51–52); Yorkshire, England
- Citizenship: British
- Education: University of Cambridge (BA); City, University of London (MA)
- Occupation: Arts administrator
- Years active: 1990s–present
- Employer: Barbican Centre
- Known for: CEO of the Barbican Centre, CEO of The Glasshouse
- Title: Chief Executive Officer

Abigail Pogson is a British arts executive who has been Chief Executive Officer of the Barbican Centre since January 2026. She previously was chief executive of The Glasshouse International Centre for Music (formerly Sage Gateshead) from 2015 to 2025.

== Early life and education ==
Pogson was born and grew up in Yorkshire. She studied Modern and Medieval Languages at the University of Cambridge and subsequently completed an MA in Cultural Management at City, University of London.

== Career ==
=== Early positions ===
Following her postgraduate studies, Pogson began working in the arts sector. Her early career included positions at English National Opera, Music Theatre Wales, and the Society for the Promotion of New Music (now Sound and Music). In 2007–08, she was a Fellow on the Clore Leadership Programme.

Before joining Sage Gateshead, Pogson was Chief Executive of Spitalfields Music, a charity based in East London known for its Summer and Winter Festivals and year-round Learning and Participation Programme.

=== Sage Gateshead and The Glasshouse ===
Pogson was appointed managing director of Sage Gateshead in 2015, succeeding Anthony Sargent CBE after a phased handover. During her tenure, the venue welcomed over two million visitors annually and engaged more than 1.7 million young people in music education and performance activities.

In 2023, under Pogson's leadership, Sage Gateshead was rebranded as The Glasshouse International Centre for Music following the announcement that a neighbouring arena would take the Sage name. The rebrand involved extensive public consultation, with the new name referencing the venue's distinctive architecture featuring 630 panes of glass.

During her decade at the organisation, The Glasshouse contributed an estimated £1 billion to the local economy and opened music education opportunities to 1.8 million young people.

=== Barbican Centre ===
In September 2025, following an international recruitment process, Pogson was appointed chief executive officer of the Barbican Centre, Europe's largest arts complex. She assumed the role on 5 January 2026, succeeding former CEO Clare Spencer and interim CEO David Farnsworth. Her appointment coincided with the Barbican Renewal programme, a £191 million investment by the City of London Corporation to restore and revitalise the Grade II listed buildings.

== Board memberships and advisory roles ==
Pogson has been on several cultural organisation boards. She was appointed to the National Council of Arts Council England in May 2022 for a four-year term running until May 2026. She was a trustee for V&A Dundee and chair of Sunderland Empire Theatre Trust. She is a director of the North East England Chamber of Commerce, chair of Theatre Green Book, and vice-president of the European Concert Hall Organisation.
