= Barbican Conservatory =

Nature centre in London, England

Coordinates: 51.5202°N 0.095°W

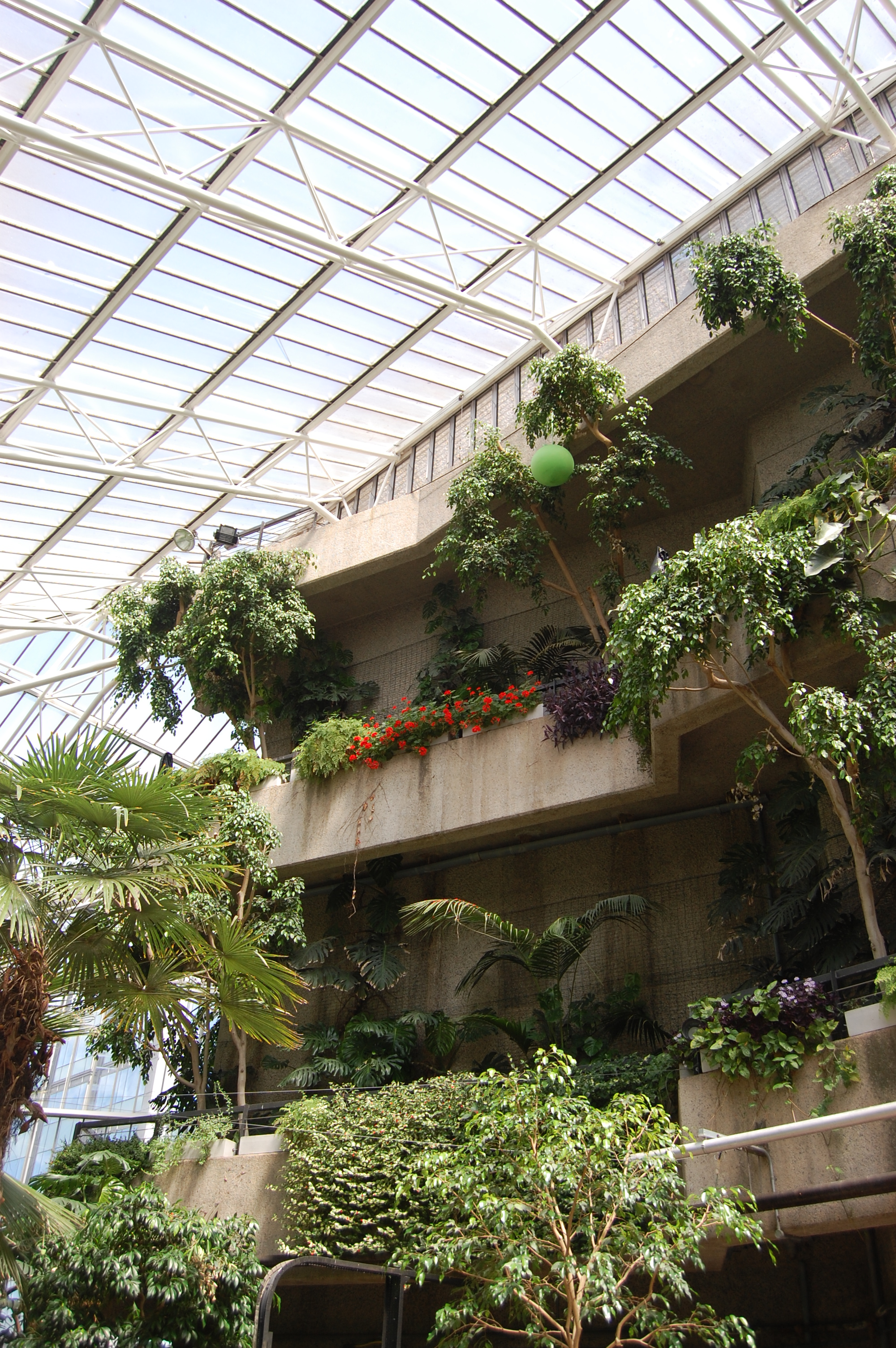
- The conservatory in 2014
- Interactive map of Barbican Conservatory
- Location: Barbican Centre
- Area: 23,000 square feet (2,100 m^{2})
- Opened: 1984
- Species: > 2,000
- Website: barbican.org.uk/whats-on/2026/event/visit-the-conservatory

The Barbican Conservatory is the second largest conservatory in London, after the Princess of Wales Conservatory at Kew Gardens. Located at the Barbican Centre, where it is on top of the theatre's fly tower, it covers 23,000 square feet (2,100 m^{2}) and houses more than 2,000 species of plants and trees, as well as terrapins and koi carp.

The conservatory opened in 1984; the Arid House, housing cacti, was added in 1986. It will close in 2026 for a three-year renovation, part of a general renovation of the Barbican Centre, which will include needed repairs to the roof and providing access for wheelchair users.
