= Barbican Centre =

Performing arts centre in London, England

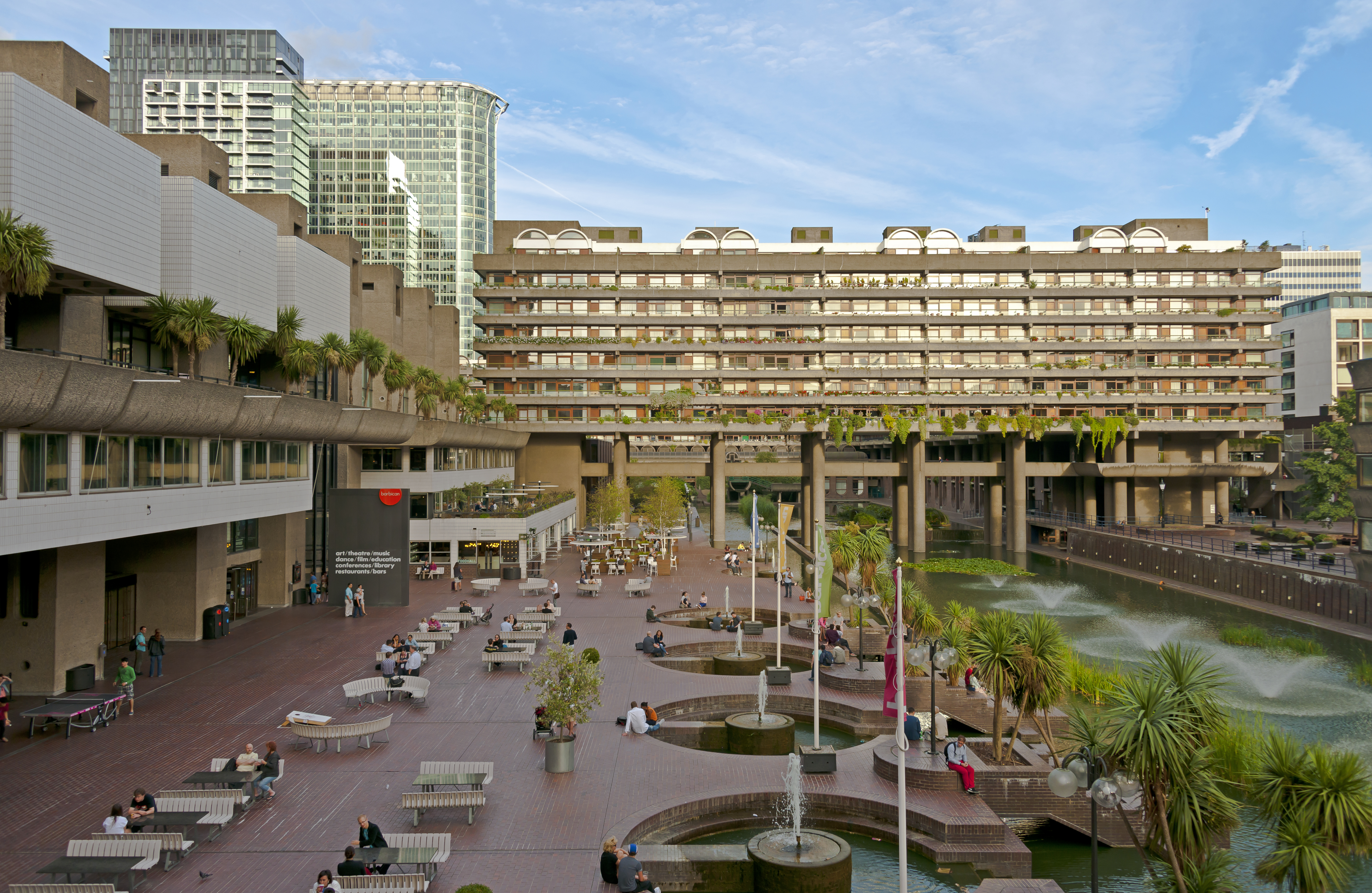
- Barbican Lakeside on a summer evening
- Interactive map of Barbican Centre
- Address: Silk Street; London, EC2; United Kingdom
- Coordinates: 51.5202°N 0.0950°W
- Owner: City of London Corporation
- Capacity: Barbican Hall: 1,943; Barbican Theatre: 1,156; The Pit: 200; Barbican Film; Cinema 1: 288; Cinema 2: 156; Cinema 3: 156
- Type: performing arts centre
- Public transit: Barbican; Farringdon; Moorgate

Listed Building – Grade II
- Official name: Barbican
- Designated: 5 September 2001
- Reference no.: 1352667

Construction
- Opened: 1982; 44 years ago
- Architect: Chamberlin, Powell and Bon

Website
- barbican.org.uk

The Barbican Centre is a performing arts centre in the Barbican Estate in the City of London. The centre hosts classical and contemporary music concerts, theatre performances, film screenings and art exhibitions. It also houses a library, three restaurants, and a conservatory. The Barbican Centre is a member of the Global Cultural Districts Network.

The London Symphony Orchestra and the BBC Symphony Orchestra are based in the centre's Concert Hall. In 2013, it once again became the London-based venue of the Royal Shakespeare Company following the company's departure in 2001.

It was built as the City of London's gift to the nation at a cost of £161 million (equivalent to £574 million in 2025), and was officially opened to the public by Queen Elizabeth II on 3 March 1982. Together with the Southbank Centre, a similar arts centre, the Barbican Centre is also known for its brutalist architecture.

== Leadership and governance ==
The Barbican Centre is owned, funded, and managed by the City of London Corporation and governed by the Barbican Centre Board, chaired by Sir William Russell.

Sir John Tusa served as managing director from 1995 to 2007, overseeing a period of significant development including a major refurbishment programme. He was succeeded by Sir Nicholas Kenyon, who held the position from 2007 until September 2021. Kenyon's departure followed the June 2021 publication of Barbican Stories, a dossier compiled by current and former staff alleging institutional racism at the centre.

Following Kenyon's departure, Will Gompertz and Sandeep Dwesar served as joint interim managing directors. In 2022, the role was restructured from managing director to chief executive, with Claire Spencer appointed as the centre's first CEO. Spencer stepped down in 2024 after two years in the role. Abigail Pogson was appointed as CEO in 2026.

In 2026, the Barbican Centre announced that Devyani Saltzman, who had served as its Director for Arts and Participation since February 2024, would leave in May 2026 following a phase of artistic and organisational transition. Her tenure included the development of a renewed artistic vision and cross-arts programming strategy. The Barbican confirmed that the position would not be replaced as part of wider structural changes. Her departure prompted an open letter from cultural figures calling for transparency and the institution’s commitment to diversity in leadership.

== Performance halls and facilities ==
- Barbican Hall: capacity 1,943; home of the London Symphony Orchestra and the BBC Symphony Orchestra.
- Barbican Theatre: capacity 1,156; designed exclusively by and for the Royal Shakespeare Company
- The Pit: flexible 200-seat theatre venue
- Barbican Art Gallery and the free new-commission gallery The Curve
- Barbican Film: 3 cinema screens with seating capacities of 288, 156 and 156
- Barbican Library: Public lending library with special collections in arts and music
- Restaurants: 3
- Conference halls: 7
- Trade exhibition halls: 2
- Informal performance spaces

The second-floor library is one of the five City of London libraries. It is one of the largest public libraries in London and has a separate arts library, a large music library and a children's library that regularly conducts free events. The Barbican Library houses the 'London Collection' of historical books and resources, some of which date back to the 18th century, all being available on loan. The library presents regular literary events and has an art exhibition space for hire. The music library has two free practice pianos for public use.

== History and design ==
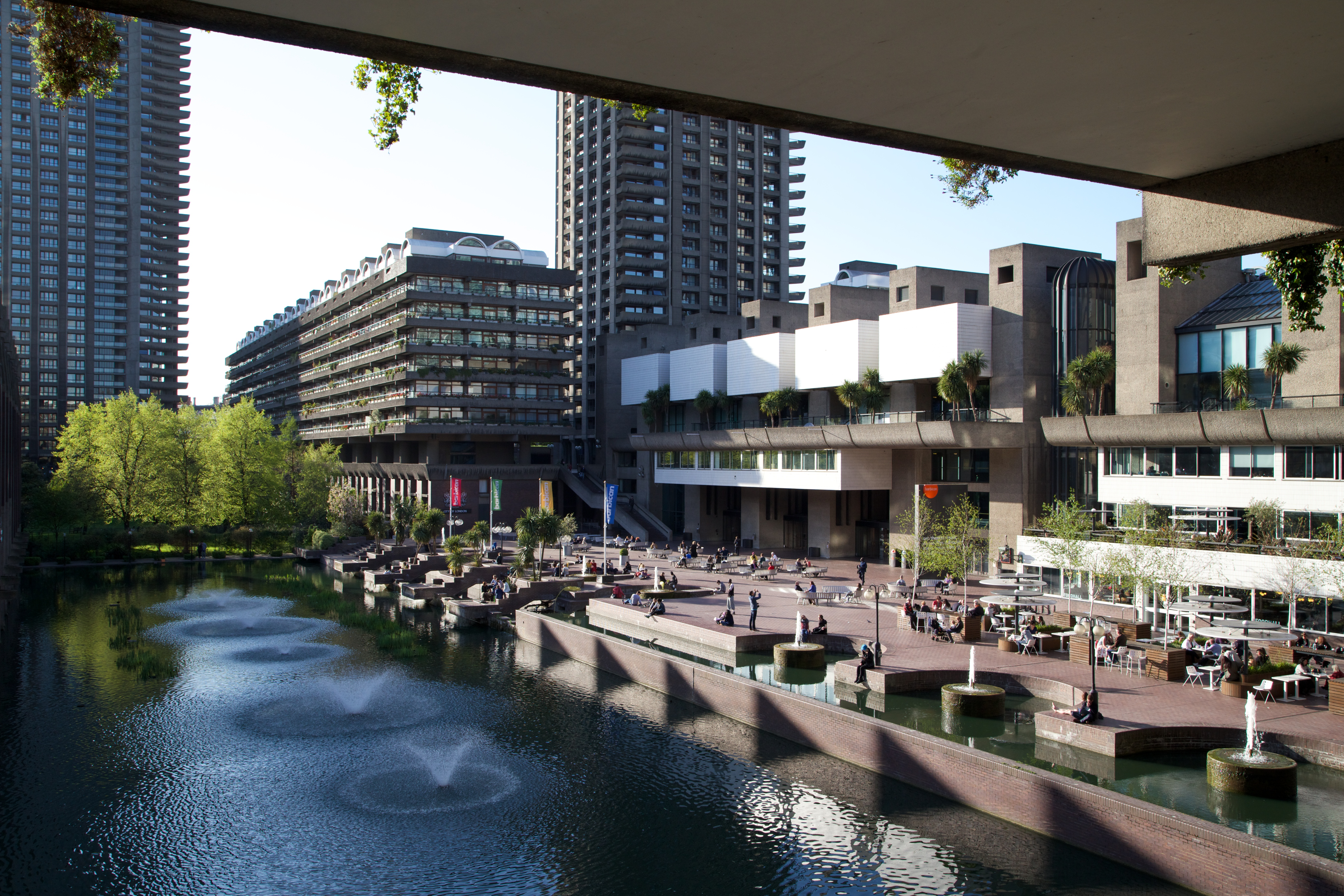
The waterway and fountains at the heart of the Barbican Centre

The Barbican Centre had a long development period, only opening some years after the surrounding Barbican Estate housing complex had been completed. It is situated in an area which was badly bombed during World War II.

The Barbican Centre, designed by Peter Chamberlin, Geoffry Powell and Christoph Bon of Chamberlin, Powell and Bon in the Brutalist style, has a complex multi-level layout with numerous entrances. Lines painted on the ground help visitors find their way around. The Barbican Centre's design – a concrete ziggurat – has always been controversial and divides opinion. It was voted "London's ugliest building" in a Grey London poll in September 2003.

In September 2001, arts minister Tessa Blackstone announced that the Barbican Centre complex was to be a Grade II listed building. It was designated a site of special architectural interest for its scale, its cohesion and the ambition of the project. The centre was designed by Chamberlin, Powell and Bon, the architects of Barbican Estate as well as the nearby Golden Lane Estate. Project architect John Honer later worked on the British Library at St Pancras – a red brick ziggurat.

In the mid-1990s, a cosmetic improvement scheme by Theo Crosby, of the Pentagram design studio, added statues and decorative features reminiscent of the Arts and Crafts movement. In 2005–2006, the centre underwent a more significant refurbishment, designed by architects Allford Hall Monaghan Morris and Roger Westman, which improved circulation and introduced bold signage in a style in keeping with the centre's original 1970s Brutalist architecture. That improvement scheme added an internal bridge linking the Silk Street foyer area with the lakeside foyer area. The centre's Silk Street entrance, previously dominated by an access for vehicles, was modified to give better pedestrian access. The scheme included removing most of the mid-1990s embellishments.

Outside, the main focal point of the centre is the lake and its neighbouring terrace. The theatre's fly tower has been surrounded by glass and made into a high-level conservatory.

The Barbican Hall's acoustic has also been controversial: some praised it as attractively warm, but others found it too dry for large-scale orchestral performance. In 1994, Chicago acoustician Larry Kirkegaard oversaw a £500,000 acoustic re-engineering of the hall "producing a perceptible improvement in echo control and sound absorption", music critic Norman Lebrecht wrote in October 2000 – and returned in 2001 to rip out the stage canopy and drop adjustable acoustic reflectors, designed by Caruso St John, from the ceiling, as part of a £7.5 mn refurbishment of the hall. Art music magazine Gramophone still complained about "the relative dryness of the Barbican acoustic" in August 2007.

The theatre was built as the London home of the Royal Shakespeare Company, which was involved in the design, but decided not to renew its contract in 2002 after claiming a lack of performing space, plus the artistic director, Adrian Noble, wanting to develop the company's touring performances. The theatre's response was to extend its existing six-month season of international productions, "Barbican International Theatre Event", to the whole year. On 23 January 2013, Greg Doran, RSC artistic director, announced the company's return to the Barbican Centre in a three-year season of Shakespeare's history plays.

In 2017, a new concert hall called the Centre for Music, London was proposed by the Barbican, London Symphony Orchestra, and the Guildhall School of Music and Drama. The proposals were cancelled in 2021.

The Guildhall School of Music and Drama, where the Barbican Centre theatrical performances are occasionally staged, and the City of London's Barbican Library, neither part of the centre, are also on the site. The Museum of London is nearby at Aldersgate, and is also within the Barbican Estate.

== London Australian Film Festival ==
The annual London Australian Film Festival (LAFF), supported by the Australian Film Commission (AFC), was formerly held at the Barbican Theatre, from March 1994 until the 17th edition in 2011. In 2017, the volunteer-run London Australian Film Society founded a new festival, initially named Oz Film Festival but later renamed London Australian Film Festival. Despite the identical name, it has nothing to do with the LAFF at the Barbican, and screenings are held at other cinemas in London.

== In popular culture ==
The Barbican Centre features in Michael Paraskos's novel In Search of Sixpence as the home of the lead character, Geroud, and also a bar called "The Gin Bar" loosely based on the Gin Joint bar at the Barbican Centre.

=== Television ===
Several Barbican locations appear as foreground, background, or both, in the Star Wars Andor series.

Many places in and views of the Barbican appear in many episodes of the Slow Horses TV series based on novels by Mick Herron.

=== Music ===
The music video for "As It Was", a 2022 song by English singer-songwriter Harry Styles, was filmed extensively in the Barbican Centre and the Barbican Conservatory.

Bladee's music video for his song "Like a Virgin" was shot on the grounds of the Barbican Centre.

== Gallery ==
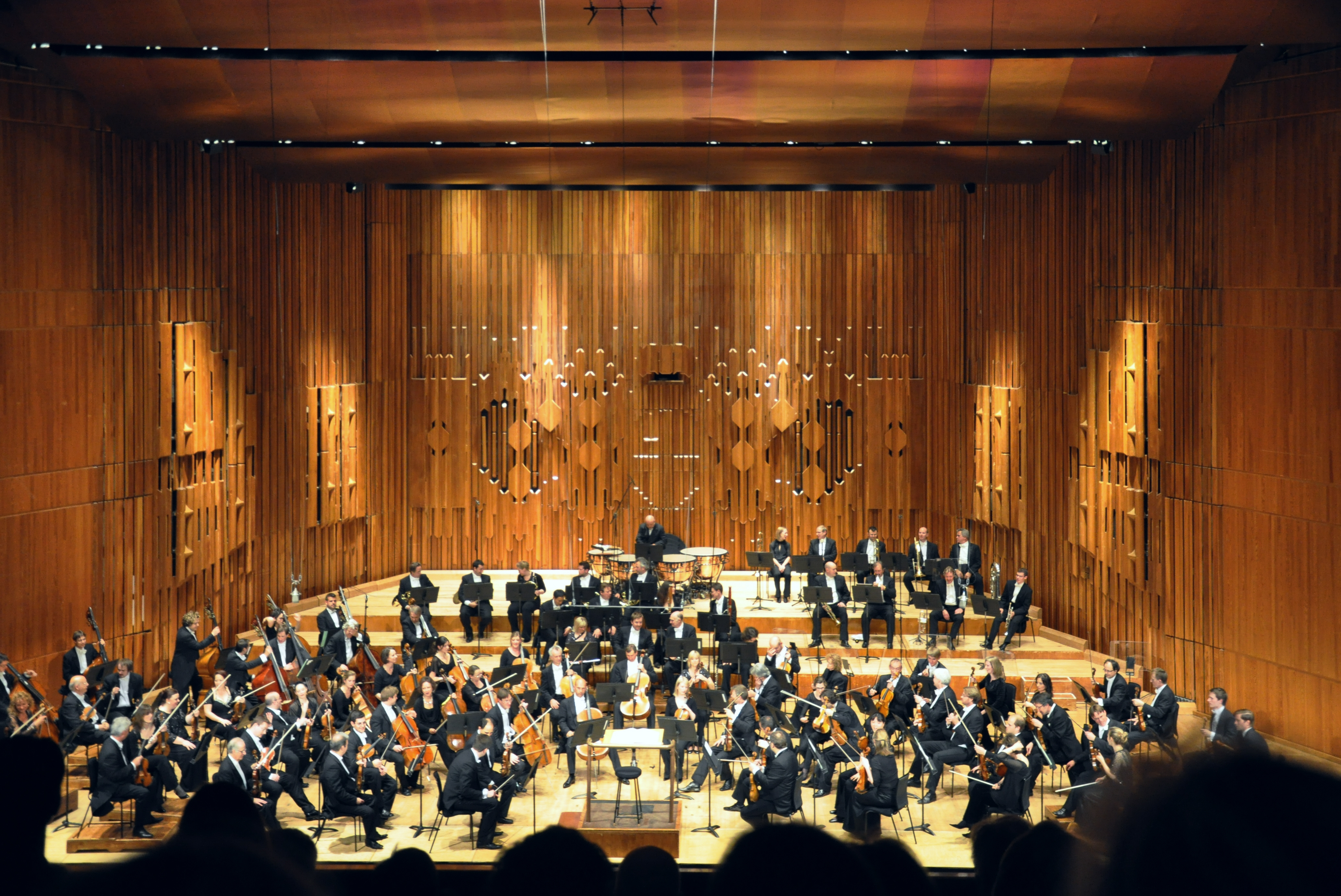
The Barbican Hall of the Barbican Centre

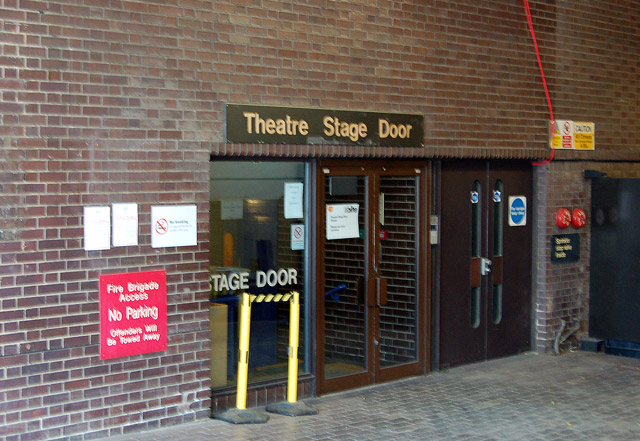
The Barbican Centre stage door

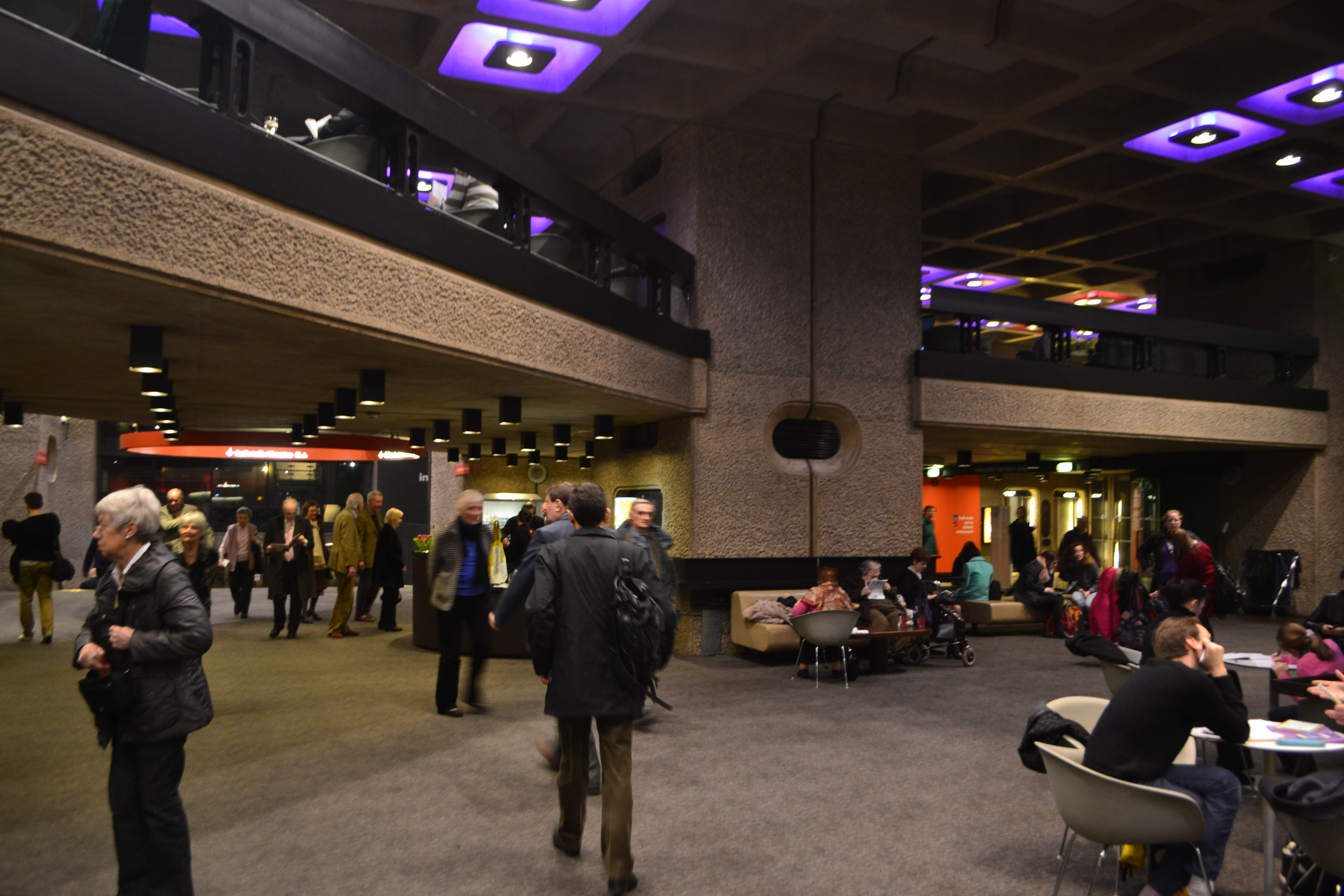
The Barbican Centre foyer

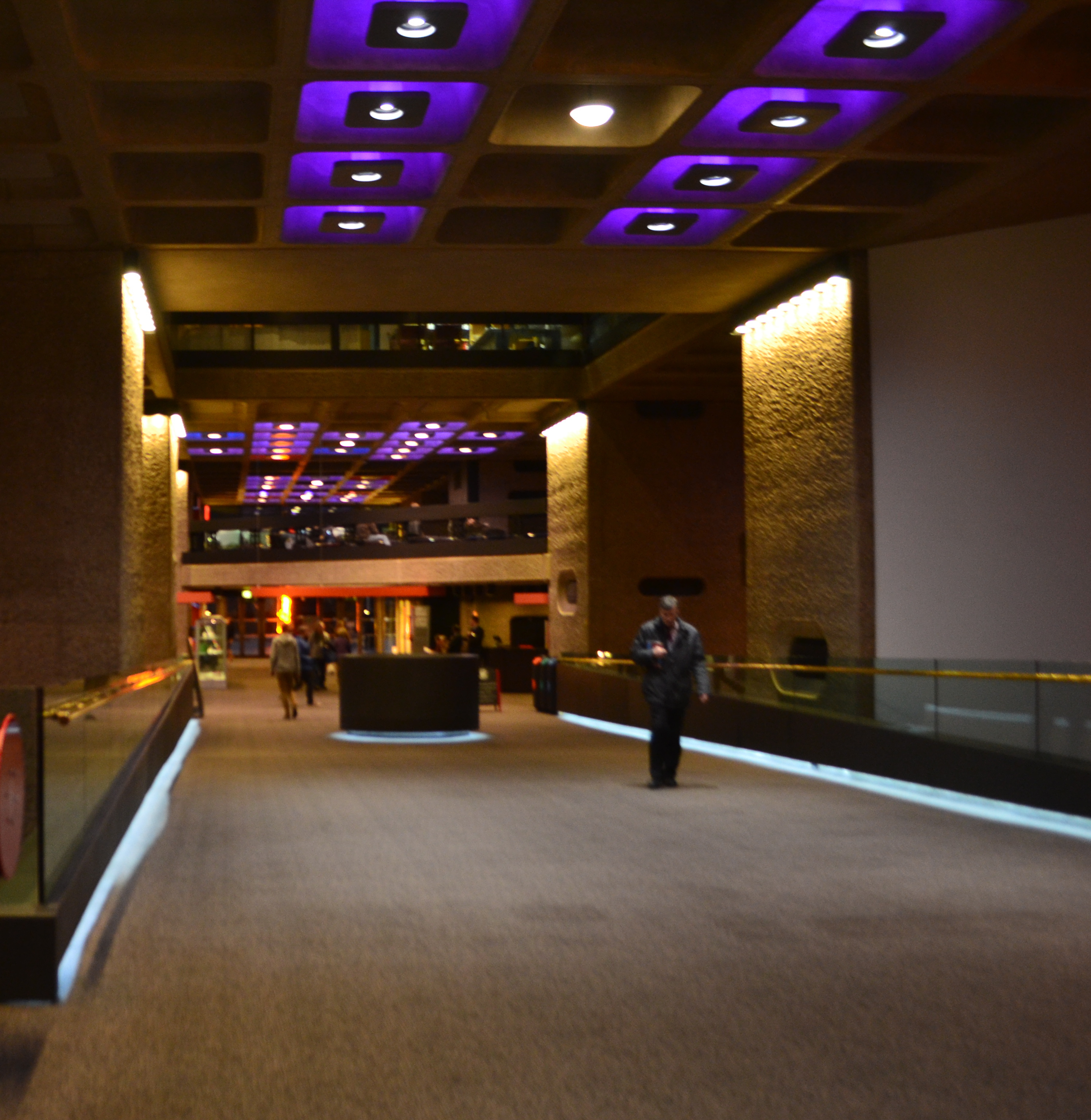
Interior of The Barbican Centre

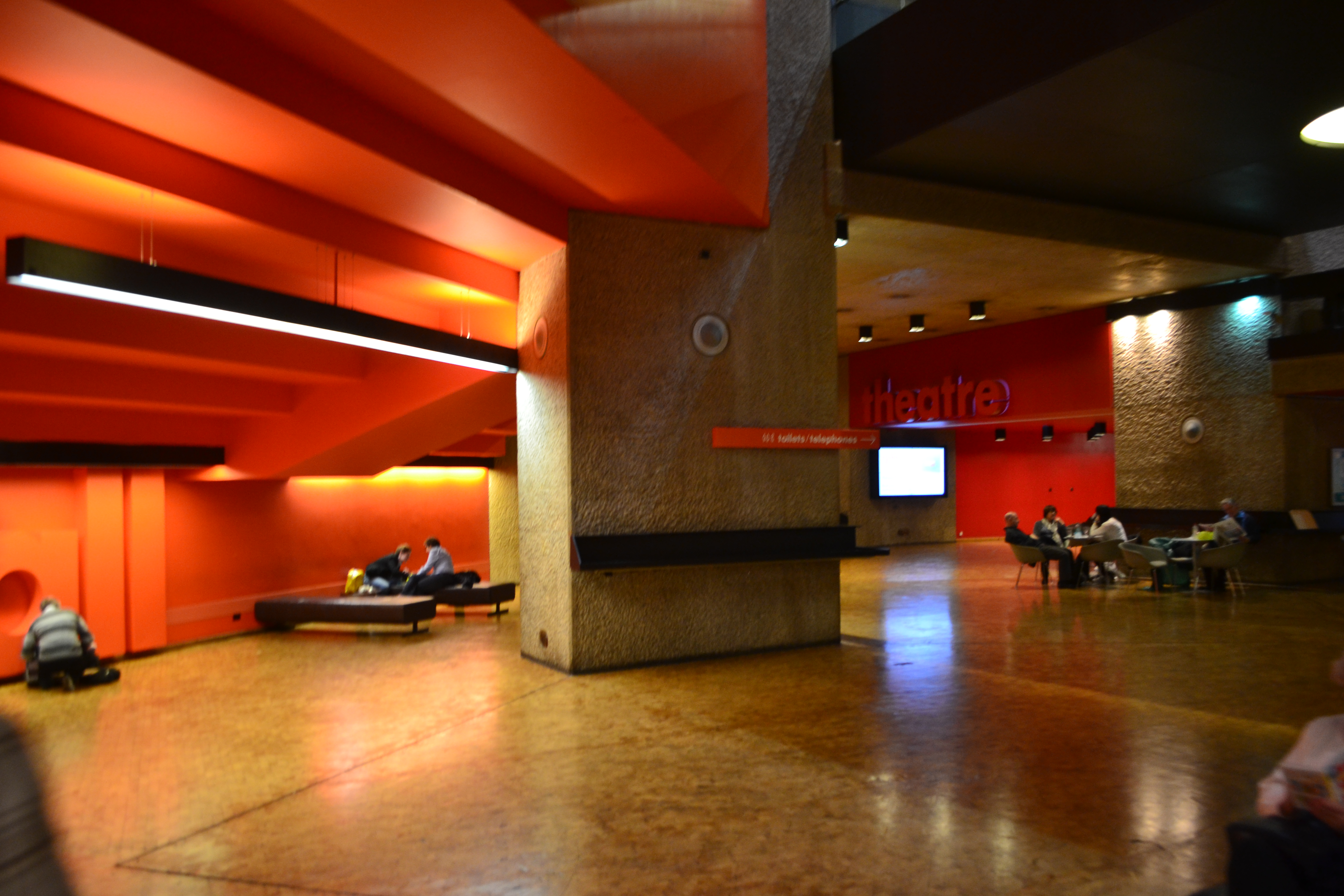
Entrance of The Barbican Centre

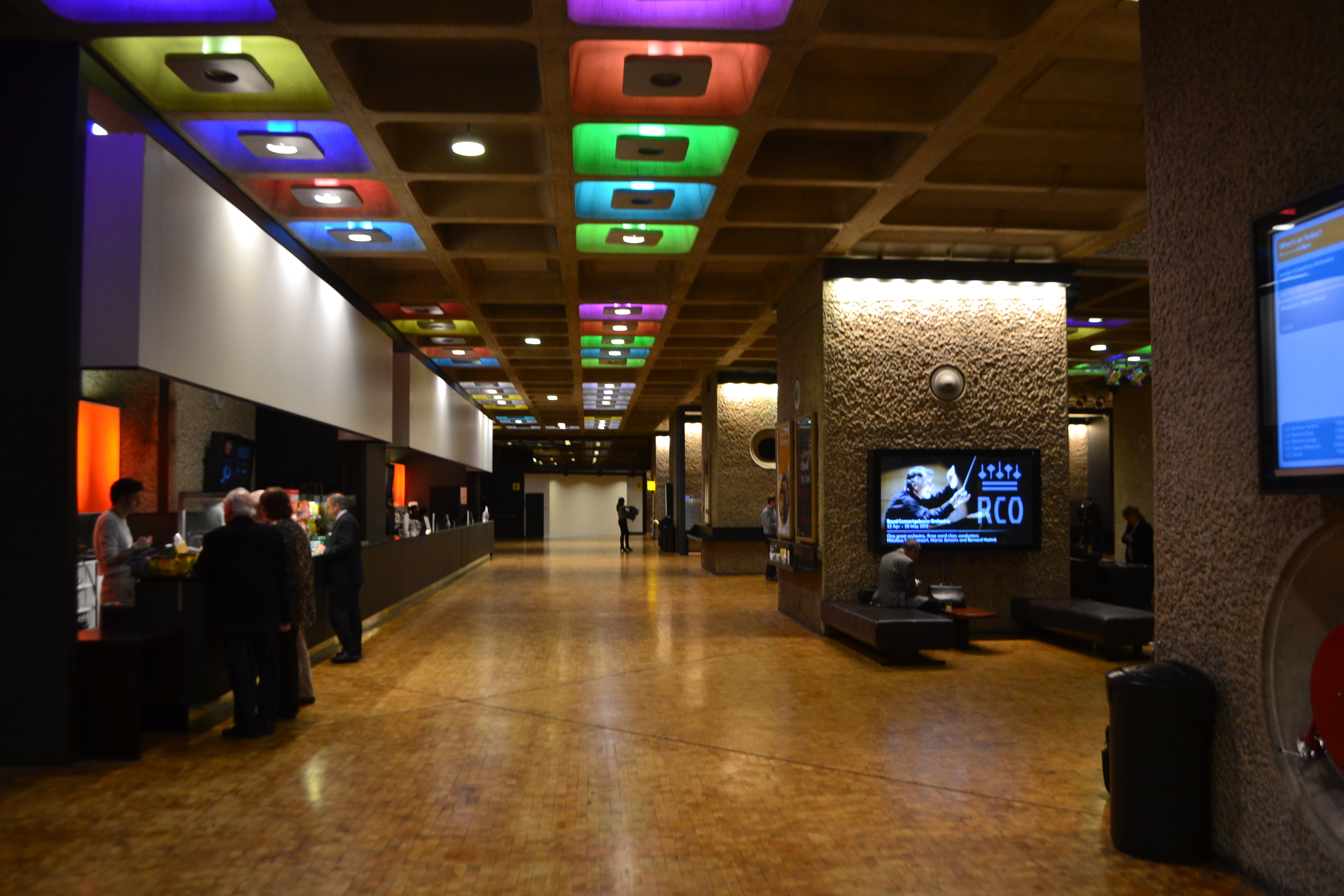
The Barbican Centre's ceiling

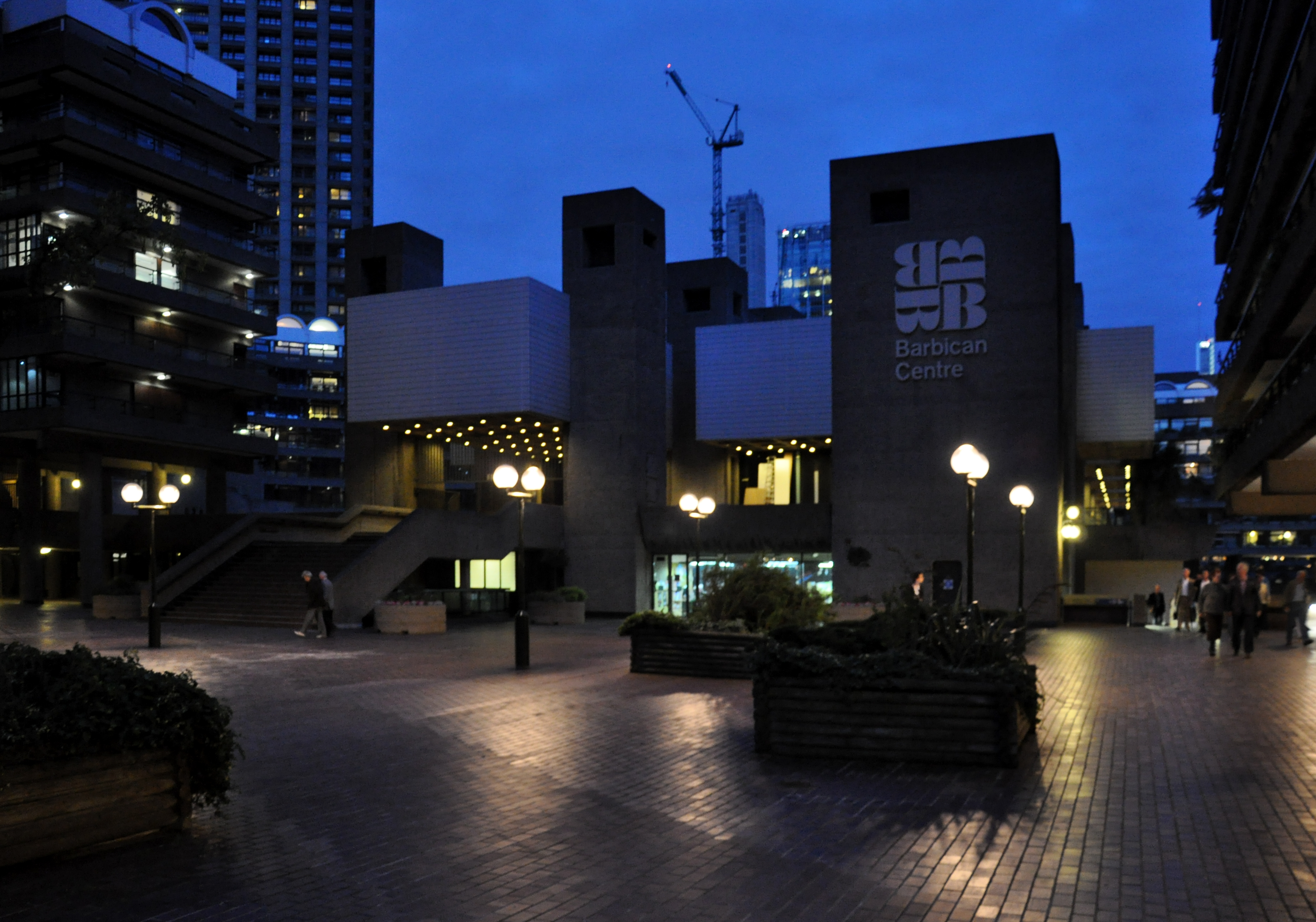
The Barbican Centre at night

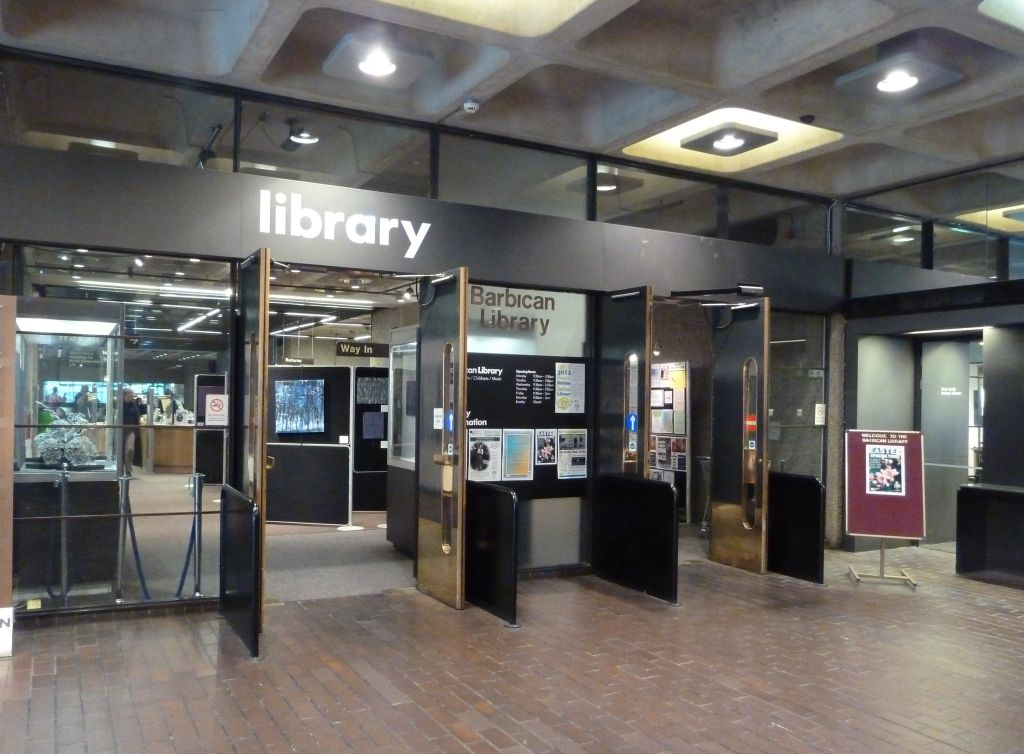
The entrance to the Barbican Library

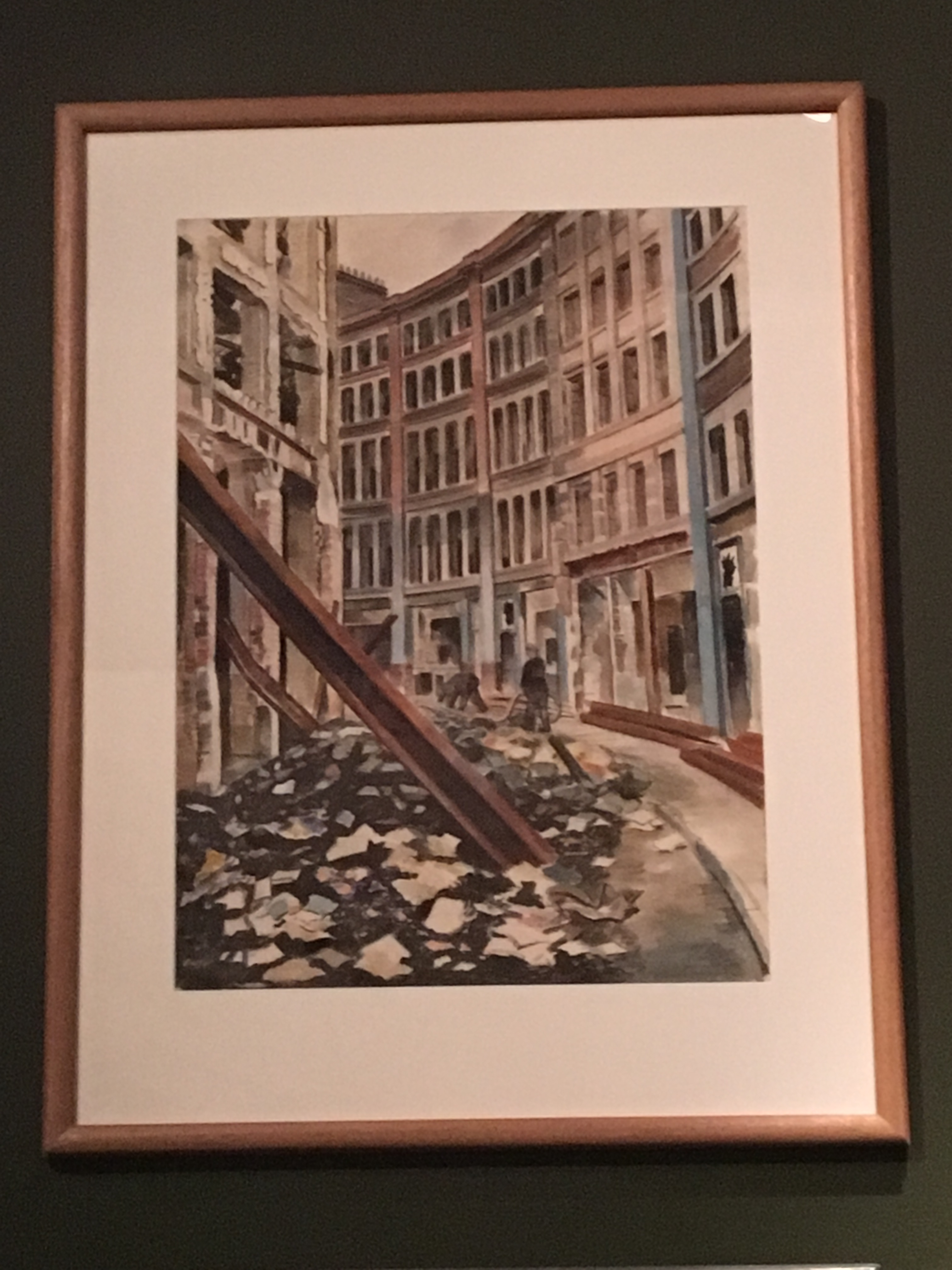
Jewin Crescent – Barbican before the Barbican

== Nearby railway stations ==
- Barbican tube station
- Farringdon station
- Liverpool Street railway station
- Moorgate tube station
- St Paul's tube station

== See also ==
- York Barbican
- Barbicania, a feature-length film by Ila Bêka & Louise Lemoine
- Culture of London
- List of concert halls
