= Murat Bektanov =

Kazakh high supreme general

Lieutenant General Murat Bektanov
- Мұрат Бектанов
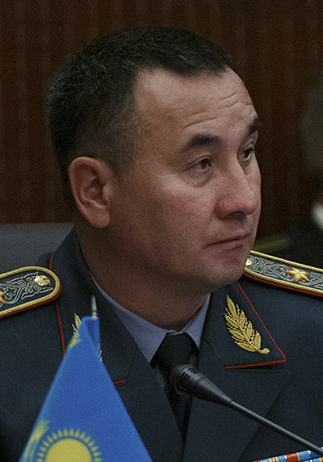
- Bektanov in 2019

Minister of Defence
- In office 31 August 2021 – 19 January 2022
- President: Kassym-Jomart Tokayev
- Prime Minister: Askar Mamin; Älihan Smaiylov
- Preceded by: Nurlan Yermekbayev
- Succeeded by: Ruslan Jaqsylyqov

Chief of the General Staff
- In office 5 April 2019 – 31 August 2021
- President: Kassym-Jomart Tokayev
- Preceded by: Murat Maikeyev
- Succeeded by: Marat Khusainov

Commander-in-Chief of the Kazakh Ground Forces
- In office 15 September 2016 – 5 April 2019
- President: Nursultan Nazarbayev; Kassym-Jomart Tokayev
- Preceded by: Murat Maikeyev
- Succeeded by: Marat Khusainov

Personal details
- Born: 18 September 1965 (age 61) Sokolovka, Kazakh SSR, Soviet Union

Military service
- Allegiance: USSR; Kazakhstan
- Branch/service: Soviet Army; Kazakh Ground Forces
- Years of service: 1982–2022
- Rank: Lieutenant General

Murat Käribaiūly Bektanov (Kazakh: Мұрат Кәрібайұлы Бектанов, romanized: Mūrat Kärıbaiūly Bektanov) is a Kazakh former military leader and was the Minister of Defence. He previously served as the Chief of the General Staff and Commander-in-Chief of the Kazakh Ground Forces.

== Early life and career ==
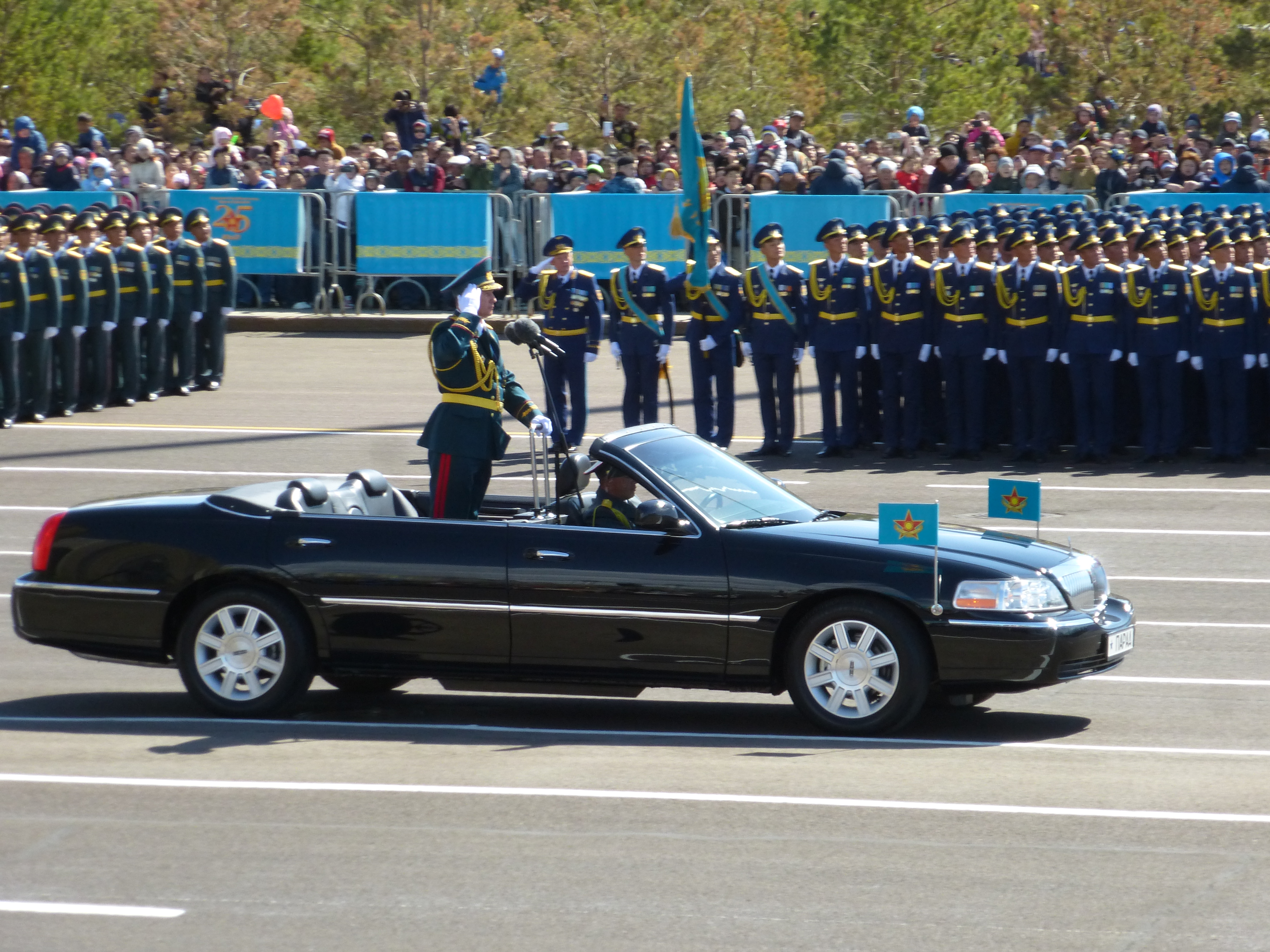
Bektanov in a 2003 Lincoln Town Car during a military parade on Independence Square, May 2017.

Born in the village of Sokolovka in North Kazakhstan Region, Bektanov graduated from the Kiev Higher Combined Arms Command School in the Ukrainian Soviet Socialist Republic. From 1989–1990, he commanded a motorized rifle platoon of the Soviet Army. After the dissolution of the Soviet Union, he served as head of an intelligence unit of an airborne assault battalion. From 1993–1997, he was the commander of a platoon at the Alma-Ata Higher All-Arms Command School. From 1997–1998, he was an officer in a combat training department of the Ministry of Defense of Kazakhstan. Up until he studied at the Military Academy of the Armed Forces. From 2001–2005, he served as head of the Operational Directorate and Training Department of the Republican Guard before studying at the Military Academy of the General Staff.

== High posts ==
From 2013–2016, he was Commander of the Regional Command "East", and from 2016–2019, he was Commander-in-Chief of the Kazakh Ground Forces. In April 2019, he became Chief of the General Staff. During his work as the Chief of the General Staff, the Arys tragedy took place on June 24, 2019, just outside the town of Arys, when an explosion at a nearby military ammunition depot damaged nearly 85 percent of the town. Bektanov was considered accountable for the incident by President Kassym-Jomart Tokayev and was given a formal strict reprimand.

== Defence minister ==
On 31 August 2021, Bektanov became the Minister of Defence, succeeding Nurlan Ermekbaev following another tragic explosion in Jambyl Region. On 11 January 2022 he was reappointed as the Minister of Defense in the Smaiylov Cabinet.

== Firing and arrest ==
On 19 January 2022, he was relieved of the post and replaced by Ruslan Jaqsylyqov. President Kassym-Jomart Tokayev claimed Bektanov did not show good leadership during the 2022 Kazakh unrest. A month later, Bektanov was detained and placed under arrest on suspicion of official inaction during the state of emergency introduced in connection with mass protests.

On March 9, 2023, Bektanov was convicted by the verdict of the Specialized Interdistrict Military Court for Criminal Cases dated February 24, 2023 under part 3 of Article 451 of the Criminal Code of the Republic of Kazakhstan (abuse of power), he was sentenced to imprisonment for a period of 12 years with serving his sentence in an institution of the maximum security penal system.

== Awards ==
- Order of Glory, 2nd degree (2014)

== See also ==
- Chief of the General Staff (Kazakhstan)
