= Murat Maikeyev =

Kazakh military figure (born 1959)

Lieutenant General Murat Maikeyev
- Murat Jáleluly Maıkeev; Мұрат Жәлелұлы Майкеев
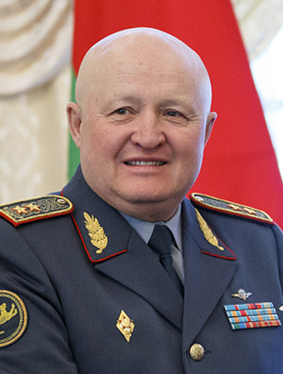
- Maikeyev in 2018
- Born: 9 November 1959 (age 66); Aktobe, Kazakh SSR, Soviet Union
- Relatives: Mukhtar Maykeyev (brother)
- Military career
- Allegiance: USSR; Kazakhstan
- Branch: Kazakh Ground Forces
- Service years: 1980–present
- Rank: Lieutenant General
- Commands: Chief of the General Staff

Murat Jaleluly Maikeyev (Kazakh: Мұрат Жәлелұлы Майкеев, Mūrat Jälelūly Maikeev; born 9 November 1959) is a Kazakh military figure who served as the Chief of the General Staff of the Armed Forces of the Republic of Kazakhstan from 2016 to 2019.

== Early life and career ==
He was born on 9 November 1959 in the Aktobe Region of Kazakhstan. In 1966, he went to the first grade of secondary school No. 1 in the town of Gvardeysk, Zhambyl region, and graduated in 1976. He entered the Soviet Army at age 21 and attended the Alma-Ata Higher All-Arms Command School in 1980. Between 1980 and 1990, he served as an officer in the Transbaikal Military District and the Group of Soviet Forces in Germany.

== Kazakh Army ==
In 1994, he attended the Frunze Military Academy in Russia. In September 2003, Maikeyev was appointed commander of the Airmobile Forces of the Armed Forces.

== High command ==
In March 2010, he was appointed Commander-in-Chief of the Ground Forces. On 28 June 2014, Maikeyev graduated from the Military Academy of Belarus. On 15 September 2016, he was appointed Chief of the General Staff of the Armed Forces of the Republic of Kazakhstan. He was relieved of his duties on 5 April 2019. In October 2022, he was appointed head of the Specialized Lyceum for Gifted Children "Arystan"

== Awards ==
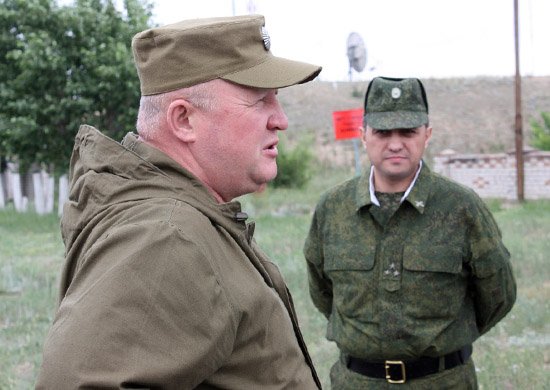
Maikeyev in combat uniform.

- Order for Service to the Motherland in the Armed Forces of the USSR, 3 degrees
- Order of Valor (Kazakhstan), 2nd degree (2001)
- Order of Glory, 1st degree (2017)
- Order of Glory, 2nd degree (2012)
- Astana Medal
- Medal "10 years of Astana"
- Medal "For Contribution to the Development of International Cooperation"
- Medal "For participation in peacekeeping operations"
- Medal "10 years of the Constitution of the Republic of Kazakhstan"
- Medal "10 years of the Armed Forces of the Republic of Kazakhstan"
- Medal "20 years of the Armed Forces of the Republic of Kazakhstan"
- Medal "For Impeccable Service" 2nd and 3rd degrees
- Medal "70 years of the Armed Forces of the USSR"
- Medal "60 years of the liberation of the Republic of Belarus from Nazi invaders"
- Medal "5 years of the Armed Forces of the Republic of Tajikistan"
- Medal "10 years of the Armed Forces of the Republic of Tajikistan"
- Medal of Zhukov
- Army General Margelov Medal
- Medal "For the military cooperation of the Mongolian People’s Army and the Soviet Army"
- Medal "70 years of the creation of the Airborne Troops of the USSR"

== See also ==
- Chief of the General Staff (Kazakhstan)
