= Bakhytzhan Ertaev =

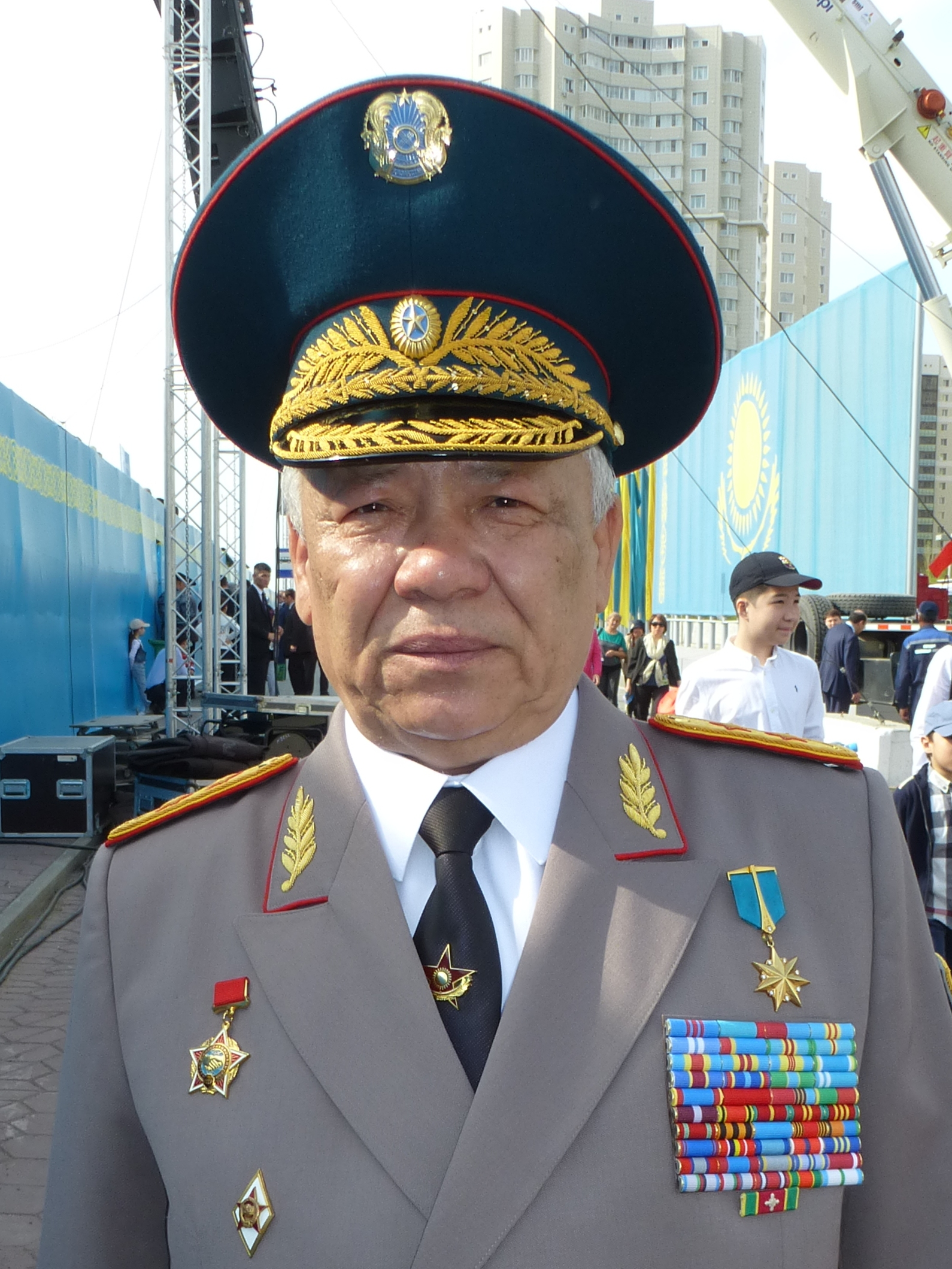

Commander of the Eastern Military District of the Armed Forces of the Republic of Kazakhstan
- In office 7 August 2000 – 29 January 2002
- President: Nursultan Nazarbayev
- Succeeded by: Nurlan Dzhulamanov

Chief of the General Staff of the Armed Forces of the Republic of Kazakhstan
- In office 14 October 1997 – 7 August 2000
- President: Nursultan Nazarbayev
- Preceded by: Alikhan Dzharbulov

Personal details
- Born: 25 July 1952 (age 74) Taraz, Kazakh SSR, Soviet Union

Military service
- Allegiance: USSR; Kazakhstan
- Branch/service: Kazakh Ground Forces
- Years of service: Since 1973
- Rank: Lieutenant General
- Battles/wars: Soviet–Afghan War
- Awards: Hero of Kazakhstan; Order of Otan; Order of Glory

Bakhytzhan Ertaevich Ertaev (Kazakh: Бақытжан Ертайұлы Ертаев, romanized: Baqytjan Ertaiūly Ertaev; born in Zhambyl on July 25, 1952) is a Kazakhstani military commander, Kazakhstani Chief of the General Staff (1997—2000), Lieutenant general (1998), People's Hero of Kazakhstan (2008).

== Biography ==
Bakhytzhan Ertaev was born in Kenes settlement (Jualy District, Jambyl Region) on July 25, 1952. Ertaev enrolled in Tashkent Supreme All-Arms Command School named after Lenin in 1969, and went on to study at the Alma-Ata Higher Combined Arms Command School (now the Military Institute of the Kazakh Ground Forces) when the Central Asian Military District was established.

He started his officer career in 1973 as a platoon commander in the 186th motorized rifle regiment of the 68th Novgorod Order of the Red Banner Motor Rifle Division, then Ertaev became a company commander in the 186th motorized rifle regiment of the 108th Motor Rifle Division and eventually a Chief of Staff of a motorized rifle battalion. He led the 2nd Motor Rifle Battalion of the Soviet Union's task force in the city of Asadabad, Kunar province, Afghanistan.

As he graduated from the Frunze Military Academy in 1985, Bakhytzhan was appointed the commander of the 64th Slutsk-Pomeranian Motor Rifle Regiment (decorated with the Order of the Red Banner, Suvorov and Kutuzov orders) of the 35th Krasnograd Order of the Red Banner Motor Rifle Division, a part of the Group of Soviet Forces in Germany.

When the Armed Forces of the Republic of Kazakhstan were established in 1992, he served first as the second-in-command and later as the commander of the 68th Novgorod Order of the Red Banner Motor Rifle Division stationed in Saryozek, Taldykorgan Region.

Bakhytzhan Ertaev studied at the General Staff Academy (Moscow) in 1996.

Between 1997 and 2000 he held lofty positions of the Chief of the General Staff, First Deputy Minister of Defense, Chief of the General Staff of the Armed Forces of Kazakhstan. For several months in 1999 Ertaev was the acting Minister of Defense. Afterwards he served as the Commander of the Eastern Military District, and the Dean of the Military Academy of the Armed Forces of Kazakhstan (2002), where he trained young officers.

Bakhytzhan Ertaev was appointed Inspector General of the Military Inspectorate in 2008 and promoted to the helm of the Chief Inspectorate of Kazakhstan's Ministry of Defense.

In April 2011 Mr. Ertaev was appointed the Chairman of the Association of Kazakhstani Armed Forces Veterans.

In January 2012, Bakhytzhan Ertaev was voted into the 5th Mäjilis (lower chamber of the Kazakhstani parliament) on the ballot of Nur Otan People's Democratic Party.

== Prosecution ==
In early 2000, Ertaev was put on trial for illicit sale of Kazakhstani MiG-21 fighter jets to North Korea and acquitted by Almaty Garrison Court-Martial on the 4 February 2000.

== Awards ==
- Hero of Kazakhstan (December 2008);
- Order of Otan (December 2008);
- Order of Glory (Kazakhstan) 2nd Class;
- Order of the Red Star;
- Service and commemorative medals.
