= Borysyuk =

Borysyuk is a Ukrainian-language surname derived from the first name Boris. It may be Russified as Borisyuk. It may refer to:

- Ariel Borysiuk, Polish footballer
- Mykhaylo Borysyuk, a Hero of Ukraine
- Oleksandr Borysyuk, Ukrainian athlete
- Sergey Borisyuk, a Hero of the Russian Federation
