= UMP =

UMP may refer to:

== Science ==
- Ultra metal-poor star, refers to a type of star with extremely low levels of heavier elements
- Uniformly most powerful test, in statistical hypothesis testing
- Uridine monophosphate, a nucleotide
- Utility maximization problem

== Organisations ==
- Ulba Metallurgical Plant
- Ulyanovsk Mechanical Plant
- Union for a Popular Movement or UMP, as of 2015 the former name of the main right-wing political party in France
- Union for the Presidential Majority, political coalition in Djibouti
- Union of Moderate Parties or UMP, the main Vanuatuan francophone and conservative party
- United Midwestern Promoters, a racing sanctioning body
- Universiti Malaysia Pahang, a university in Malaysia

== Places ==
- Indianapolis Metropolitan Airport (by FAA code)
- Uzumba-Maramba-Pfungwe, Zimbabwe

== Other ==
- Heckler & Koch UMP, a submachine gun
- Umpila language, by ISO 639 code
- Universal mapping property

== See also ==
- ump, slang term for "umpire"
- WUMP, a sports radio station in Huntsville, Alabama, known as SportsRadio 730 The UMP
