= Azerbaijan Mambetov =

Soviet film director (1932–2009)

- Әзірбайжан Мәмбетов
- Born: 2 September 1932 (age 93); Savinka, Russian SFSR, Soviet Union
- Died: 17 November 2009 (aged 77); Astana, Kazakhstan
- Occupations: Theater director, opera director, film director, theater teacher
- Awards: Hero of Kazakhstan; Order of Otan; Order of the Red Banner of Labour; Order of Friendship of Peoples

Azerbaijan Madievich Mambetov (Note: Kazakh: Әзірбайжан Мәдиұлы Мәмбетов, romanized: Äzirbayzhan Mädīuly Mämbetov) (2 September 1932 – 17 November 2009) was a Soviet and Kazakh stage and screen director and educator. His awards include People's Hero of Kazakhstan (2000), People's Artist of the USSR (1976), and the USSR State Prize (1974).

== Biography ==
Mambetov was born in the settlement of Savinka (or Pallasovka, according to other records), now part of Pallasovsky District, Volgrograd Region, on 2 September 1932.

Mambetov moved to Alma-Ata during World War II, and it was there that he received a dual degree in Performing Arts (Alma-Ata School of Theater and Fine Arts named after Gogol) and Dancing (Alma-Ata Dance School) in 1952. He sang as a solo performer of the Kazakh SSR Song and Dance Company in his college years.

Following graduation from the Directing Dept., Lunacharsky Institute of Theater Arts in 1957, Azerbaijan Mambetov returned to Alma-Ata.

In his student years, he performed on screen and directed such plays as Personal Case (by Alexander Stein) and The Servant of Two Masters (by Carlo Goldoni) at Atyrau and Zhambyl Regional Drama Theaters.

In Alma-Ata, Mambetov became first a director at Auezov Theater, its leading director in 1965, and president in 1970.

Tensions with the company led to Mambetov's decision to leave the theater for the movie industry in the late ‘70s. After a training period at Mosfilm studios he became the director of Kazakhfilm in 1978.

Azerbaijan Mambetov returned to Auezov Theater in 1980 for 15 years as its artistic director. He left in 1995 because of another case of tension with the actors. Throughout his time with the theater, Azerbaijan Mambetov oversaw production of over 200 plays. In April 1995 he started working at the Kazakhstani Union of Theater Professionals.

In 1999 Azerbaijan Mambetov came to the helm of Kazakh Theater of Music and Drama named after Kuanyshbayev (Astana) upon President Nazarbayev's invitation. He put on plays in other cities (Prague, Moscow, Tashkent) and other theaters in Alma-Ata (Korean, Uyghur Theaters, etc.).

Mambetov's play Mother's Field (based on Chinghiz Aitmatov’s novel) was presented at the International Theater Festival of Asian, African and Latin American Countries in Shiraz (Iran) in 1973, while his play Kozy Korpesh — Bayan Sulu by Musrepov was featured in the Theater of Nations International Festival in Nancy in 1984.

Azerbaijan Mambetov started teaching at Alma-Ata Institute of Performing Arts (now known as Kazakh National Academy of Arts named after Zhurgenev) in 1970 and became a professor in 1979.

Azerbaijan Mambetov was a member of the Filmmakers Union of the Kazakh SSR, Chairman of the Kazakh Theatrical Society (Kazakhstani Union of Theater Professionals), a CPSU member and a Deputy to the 9th Supreme Soviet of the Kazakh SSR. He became a People’s Deputy of the USSR in 1989, and later was elected three times as a deputy of the Supreme Council of the Republic of Kazakhstan.

Azerbaijan Mambetov died in Astana on 18 November 2009 and was buried in Kensai cemetery in Almaty next to his wife.

=== Family ===
- Spouse — Gaziza Zhubanova, composer. People’s Artist of the USSR (1981).
- Children: Dina, Aliya, Alibi, Adai.
- Elder sister — Akkagaz Mambetova, stage actress. Distinguished Artiste of the Kazakh SSR (1966).

== Career ==
Plays

Auezov Theater
- 1957 — On Irtysh Wild Shore (Shakhmet Khusainov);
- 1959 — Wolf Cub Under the Cap (Kaltai Mukhamedzhanov);
- 1959 — Wayward Son (Egon Rannet);
- 1960 — O, These Crafty Girls! (Beu, kyzdar-ai!) by Kanabek Baiseitov and Kuandyk Shangitbayev;
- 1960 — The Start of an Era (Zein Shashkin);
- 1960 — Aiman-Sholpan (Mukhtar Auezov);
- 1961 — The In-Law Arrives (Kaltai Mukhamedzhanov);
- 1961 — Dreamers (Alzhappar Abishev);
- 1962 — Abay (Mukhtar Auezov and Leonid Sobolev);
- 1962 — The Dog in the Manger (play) (Lope de Vega);
- 1964 — Mother’s Field (Chinghiz Aitmatov);
- 1967 — Karakypchak Koblandy (Mukhtar Auezov);
- 1970 — Hey, Young Men (Oi Zhigitter-ai) by Kanabek Baiseitov and Kuandyk Shangitbayev;
- 1971 — Kozy Korpesh — Bayan Sulu by Gabit Musrepov;
- 1973 — Blood and Sweat (Abdizhamil Nurpeisov);
- 1974 — Career and Group (Mansap pen Ujdanyn) by Alzhappar Abishev;
- 1975 — The Ascent of Mt. Fuji (Chinghiz Aitmatov and Kaltai Mukhamedzhanov);
- 1974 — The Oath (Takhavi Akhtanov);
- 1981 — Karagoz (Mukhtar Auezov);
- 1982 — Uncle Vanya (Anton Chekhov);
- 1984 — Mam'zelle Nitouche (Louis-Auguste Florimond Herve);
- 1984 — The White Ship (Chinghiz Aitmatov);
- 1985 — Lost Friend (Jogalgan Dosyn) by Takhavi Akhtanov;
- 1990 — The Day Lasts More Than a Hundred Years (Chinghiz Aitmatov);
- 1992 — Coriolanus (William Shakespeare);
- 1993 — Oedipus Rex (Sophocles);
- Lenin in 1918 (Aleksei Kapler);
- One Tree Does Not Make a Forest (Abdilda Tazhibaev);
- Enlik-Kebek (Mukhtar Auezov);
- Don Juan or Love for Geometry (Max Frisch);
- The Servant of Two Masters (Carlo Goldoni).

Abay Opera House

- Enlik-Kebek (Gaziza Zhubanova);
- Tulegen Tokhtarov (score by Latif Khamidi and Akhmet Zhubanov).

Lermontov Russian Drama Theatre

- 1996 — Uncle Vanya (Anton Chekhov).

Kazakh Musical and Drama Theater named after K. Kuanyshbayev

- Kozy Korpesh — Bayan Sulu by Gabit Musrepov;
- And Then — Silence… (Helen and Noah Leary);
- Karagoz (Mukhtar Auezov);
- Mam’zelle Nitouche (Louis-Auguste Florimond Herve);
- Unexpected Encounter (Takhavi Akhtanov);
- Uncle Vanya (Anton Chekhov);
- Blood and Sweat (Abdizhamil Nurpeisov);
- Kyz Zhibek (Gabit Musrepov).

National Opera and Ballet Theater named after Kulyash Baiseitova

- Birzhan and Sara by Mukan Tulebayev.

E. B. Vakhtangov Theater

- Mother’s Field (Chinghiz Aitmatov);
- A Snow-stormy Waystation / The Day Lasts More Than a Hundred Years (Chinghiz Aitmatov);

Uzbek National Academic Drama Theater named after Hamza

- Abay (Muktar Auezov and Leonid Sobolev).

National Theatre (Prague)

- Blood and Sweat (Abdizhamil Nurpeisov).

== Filmography ==
Year	Title	Original title			
Year	Title	Original title	Producer	Actor	Notes
1948	Golden Horn (film)	Золотой рог		Token	
1966	Song Wings (film)	Крылья песни	✓		
1970	Strings of Centuries (documentary film)	Струны столетий	✓		
1976	Abai (film performance)	Абай	✓		
1978	Blood and Sweat (film)	Кровь и пот	✓		
1980	The Messengers Hurry (film)	Гонцы спешат	✓		

== Awards and honours ==
- Honored Artiste of the Kazakh SSR (1961);
- People's Artiste of the Kazakh SSR (1970);
- People's Artist of the USSR (1976);
- People's Hero of Kazakhstan (2000);
- Honorary Citizen of Astana (2000);
- USSR State Award (1974) — "for production of Blood and Sweat by Nurpeisov";
- Baiseitova State Award of the Kazakh SSR (1965) — "for Mother’s Field play by Chinghiz Aitmatov";
- Order of Otan (2000);
- Order of Friendship of Peoples;
- Order of the Red Banner of Labour.

== Legacy ==
- A memorial plaque on the building in Almaty where Azerbaijan Mambetov lived was unveiled on the 29th of April, 2011;
- Bukeikhan Street in Astana was renamed after Azerbaijan Mambetov in 2016;
- Path to Glory, a book about Mambetov by journalist Nazym Saparova, was presented on March 27, 2021;
- Nomad City Hall in Astana was renamed Azerbaijan Mambetov State Drama and Comedy Theater in October 2021.
