= List of Heroes of the Russian Federation (B) =

This is a list of people who have been awarded the title Hero of the Russian Federation.

It has been awarded more than 970 times, of which more than 440 were posthumously.

== List of Heroes of the Russian Federation ==
- Magomed Baachilov (ru)
- Vitaly Babakov (ru)
- Sergey Bavilin (ru)
- Sergey Bavykin (ru)
- Sergey Bagaev (ru)
- Khamzat Badakhov (ru)
- Nikolai Bairov (ru)
- Vadim Baykulov (ru)
- Rasim Baksikov (ru)
- Aleksey Balandin (ru)
- Vladimir Balashov (ru)
- Aleksandr Baranov
- Vladimir Barakhtenko
- Radik Bariev (ru)
- Sergey Barinov (ru)
- Vladimir Barkovsky (ru)
- Yevgeny Barmyantsev (ru)
- Sergey Basurmanov (ru)
- Rizvan Baskhanov (ru)
- Igor Batalov (ru)
- Zeynudin Batmanov (ru)
- Yuri Baturin
- Aleksey Baukin (ru)
- Ruslan Batsaev (ru)
- Sergey Bacherikov (ru)
- Aleksey Bezrukov
- Bakhtyuras Besikbayev
- Oleg Belaventsev
- Eduard Belan (ru)
- Vitaly Belikov
- Vladimir Belov (ru)
- Stepan Belov (ru)
- Aleksandr Beloglazov (ru)
- Aleksandr Belodedov (ru)
- Sergey Belozyorov (ru)
- Vladimir Belyaevsky (ru)
- Dmitry Belyaev (ru)
- Mikhail Belyaev (ru)
- Nikolai Belyaev (ru)
- Azmat Berdiyev (ru)
- Aleksandr Berzin
- Roman Bersenev (ru)
- Aleksandr Beschastnov (ru)
- Soltan-Khamid Bidzhiev (ru)
- Aleksandr Bichayev (ru)
- Roman Blinov (ru)
- Aleksandr Blokhin (ru)
- Yevgeny Bobrov (ru)
- Sergey Bogatikov (ru)
- Andrey Bogatov (ru)
- Sergey Bogdan
- Sergey Bogdanchenko (ru)
- Vladimir Bogodukhov (ru)
- Aleksandr Bogomolov (ru)
- Andrey Bogomolov (ru)
- Dmitry Boaev (ru)
- Sergey Boyko (ru)
- Aleksandr Boykov (ru)
- Pavel Boykov (ru)
- Mustafa Bokov
- Vladimir Bokovikov (ru)
- Ivan Boldyrev
- Vladimir Bolysov (ru)
- Viktor Bondarev
- Sergey Bondarev (ru)
- Aleksandr Bondarenko (ru)
- Oleg Bondarenko (ru)
- Sergey Borin (ru)
- Aleksandr Borisevich (ru)
- Andrey Borisenko
- Yevgeny Borisov (ru)
- Sergey Borisov (ru)
- Yuri Borisov
- Sergey Borisyuk (ru)
- Aleksey Borovikov (ru)
- Vladimir Borovikov (ru)
- Alexander Bortnikov
- Kanamat Botashev
- Aleksey Botyan
- Ivan Bokhonko (ru)
- Andrey Bocharov
- Vyacheslav Bocharov (ru)
- Mikhail Bochenkov (ru)
- Yevgenny Brovko
- Aleksey Brovkovich (ru)
- Nina Brusnikova
- Vasily Bryukhov (ru)
- Vitaly Bugaev (ru)
- Igor Bugay (ru)
- Yekaterina Budanova
- Viktor Budantsev (ru)
- Nikolai Budarin
- Aleksandr Buzin (ru)
- Vladimir Bulgakov (ru)
- Dmitry Bulgakov
- Sergey Burakov (ru)
- Aleksey Burilichev (ru)
- Sergey Burnaev (ru)
- Vladimir Burtsev (ru)
- Aleksey Bukhanov (ru)
- Yuri Buchnev (ru)
- Yevgeny Bushmelev (ru)
- Ivan Bykov (ru)
- Georgy Bystritsky (ru)
- Nikolai Bystritsky (ru)

== See also ==
- Awards and decorations of the Russian Federation
- Awards and Emblems of the Ministry of Defense of the Russian Federation
- Awards of the Ministry of Internal Affairs of Russia
- Awards of the Federal Security Service of the Russian Federation
- Awards of the Federal Protective Service of the Russian Federation
- Awards of the Ministry for Emergency Situations of Russia
- Honorary titles of Russia
