= Talgat Koibakov =

Kazakhstani Major General

Commander of the Ground Forces
- In office 5 November 2020 – 25 September 2023
- President: Kassym-Jomart Tokayev
- Preceded by: Marat Khusainov
- Succeeded by: Asan Zhusupov

Personal details
- Born: October 2, 1963 (age 62) Shu District, Jambyl Region, Kazakh SSR, USSR

Military service
- Branch/service: Kazakh Ground Forces
- Years of service: 1985-2023
- Rank: Lieutenant General

Talgat Mamirtayuly Koibakov (Kazakh: Талғат Мамыртайұлы Қойбақов) is a Kazakhstani retired Lieutenant General who served as the Commander-in-Chief of the Kazakh Ground Forces from 5 November 2020 to 25 September 2023. He was appointed to the position by President Kassym-Jomart Tokayev and succeeded Marat Khusainov.

His service concluded on 25 September 2023, when President Tokayev appointed Asan Zhusupov as the new Commander-in-Chief of the Ground Forces.

Military offices
Preceded by Marat Khusainov	Commander of the Ground Forces; 2020–2023	Succeeded by Asan Zhusupov
