= Xingye =

Xingye may refer to:

- Xingye County, in Guangxi, China
- Xingye Copper, copper producer in China
