= Fedor Shcherbakov =

Kazakh military officer (1947–2022)

Fyodor Shcherbakov
- Фёдор Щербаков

Commander-in-Chief of the Ground Forces
- In office 1994–2000
- President: Nursultan Nazarbayev
- Preceded by: Office established
- Succeeded by: Nurlan Jolamanov

Personal details
- Born: 26 May 1947 Bidaiyq, Zhanaarka District, Karaganda Region, Kazakh SSR, USSR
- Died: 16 August 2022 (aged 75) Almaty, Kazakhstan
- Education: Tashkent Higher All-Arms Command School; Frunze Military Academy; Military Academy of the General Staff of the Armed Forces of Russia

Military service
- Branch/service: Soviet Army; Kazakh Ground Forces
- Years of service: 1966–2000
- Rank: Lieutenant general

Lieutenant General Fyodor Ivanovich Shcherbakov (Kazakh: Фёдор Иванович Щербаков; 26 May 1947 – 16 August 2022) was a Kazakhstani military officer of Russian descent, who served as the first Commander-in-Chief of the Kazakh Ground Forces.

== Biography ==
He was born 26 May 1947 in the village of Bidaiyq in the Zhanaarka District of the Karaganda Region. From 1966 to 1970, he studied at the Tashkent Higher All-Arms Command School. After graduating from college, he served as commander of a motorized rifle platoon of the Soviet Army. In the 1970s, he served in the Group of Soviet Forces in East Germany. In 1980, he graduated from the Frunze Military Academy. From 1980 to 1987, he served as commander of a motorized rifle regiment in the Far East. By the dissolution of the Soviet Union, he was commander of the 99th Motorized Rifle Division of the Far Eastern Military District in the Magadan Oblast.

In 1992, Major General Shcherbakov graduated from the Military Academy of the General Staff of the Armed Forces of Russia, after which he continued his military service in the Armed Forces of the Republic of Kazakhstan. During that summer and that fall, he was the First Deputy Commander of the 40th Kazakh Combined Arms Army. In October 1992, he was appointed to the post of Commander of the 1st Army Corps, headquartered in Semipalatinsk. On 5 May 1993, Shcherbakov he was awarded the military rank of Lieutenant General. In February 1994, he was appointed Commander of the Ground Forces and First Deputy Minister of Defense of the Republic of Kazakhstan. He was among the few senior Kazakh professional military personnel at independence. Together with Sagadat Nurmagambetov, he developed the first military doctrine of independent Kazakhstan. In November 1997, this post officially was changed to Commander of the General Forces. In 2000, Lieutenant General Shcherbakov was transferred to the reserve at the age of 53. He was previously a top contender for the post of defence minister.

He died in Almaty on 16 August 2022.

== Awards ==
He was awarded the Order of the Red Star (USSR, 1989) and the Order of Kurmet (Republic of Kazakhstan, May 1997), as well as many medals of the USSR and the Republic of Kazakhstan.
