= Demalys Promenade =

Pedestrian zone in Astana, Kazakhstan

Coordinates: 51°9′55.7″N 71°25′23.2″E

The Demalys Promenade, also known as Arbat, is a pedestrian zone located in the historical part of the Astana, Kazakhstan that encompasses the section of Azerbaijan Mambetov Street. The area was created as part of the city's renovation plan and is open to any pedestrians on weekends and holidays with various concerts and entertainments being organised for the residents of Astana. Other entertainment venues such as fairgrounds, staging scenes, training places for sports are located within the zone.

== History ==
In 2019, a development project "Nur-Sultan-Comfortable City" began to be drafted which aimed at making the city more pedestrian friendly. In March 2021, it was announced that the part of the Azerbaijan Mambetov Street would be turned into a car-free zone for certain days.

On 12 June 2021, the area was opened to the public in which according to äkim Altai Kölgınov, the new zone will dispel the stereotype that everything in the city is done for the left bank.
