= Qasim Qaysenov =

Kazakhstani writer (1918–2006)

- Native name: Қасым Қайсенов
- Born: 23 April 1918; Asubulak village, Ulan District, Kyrgyz Krai, RSFSR
- Died: 30 December 2006 (aged 88) Almaty, Kazakhstan
- Allegiance: Soviet Union
- Branch: partisans
- Awards: Hero of Kazakhstan

Qasim Qaysenov (Kazakh: Қасым Қайсенов, romanized: Qasym Qaisenov, Russian: Касым Кайсенов, romanized: Kassym Kaisenov; 23 April 1918 — 30 December 2006) was a Kazakh partisan detachment commander in the Ukrainian SSR during World War II. After the war he wrote many books, and in 1995 he was awarded the title Hero of Kazakhstan.

== Before the war ==
Qaysenov was born on 23 April 1918 to a Kazakh family in Asubulak village. His parents were workers, and only eight of their thirteen children lived to adulthood. After finishing school in 1934 he entered the political education college in Oskemen. He then attended technical school in Ust-Kamenogorsk. After being drafted into the Red Army he was sent to the school of military intelligence.

== World War II ==
In November 1941 after completing military intelligence school he deployed deep into enemy controlled territory by parachute. His partisan activities got off to a rough start after his parachute got stuck on the cross of a local church, but local residents rescued him before he could be captured or killed by enemy soldiers. As a partisan leader, Qaysenov was put in charge of a demolition detachment. He and his crews were based in the Ukrainian SSR but conducted operations in the Ukrainian SSR, the Moldavian SSR, Romania, and Czechoslovakia. During the course of the war he parachuted into enemy territory four times: in November 1941 to the Ukrainian SSR, the Moldavian SSR in 1943, to Romania in early 1944, and to the Carpathian mountains in June 1944. They participated in the capture of Bukrinsky bridgehead and the crossing of the Dnieper. They also liberated over 700 prisoners from the Belaya Tanya concentration camp. However, his detachment suffered severe casualties: over 100 of them were killed in the battles for Grigorievka, Lukovitsy, Zarubintsy, and after the Dnieper operation only 20 of them remained alive. For his heroism he received many state awards including the Order of Bogdan Khmelnitsky and was praised by the famous Ukrainian partisan leader Sydir Kovpak.

== After the war ==
After the end hostilities, Qaysenov returned to his homeland but remained friends with many of his fellow partisans. Initially he had a hard time getting a job, but with a letter of recommendation from Sydir Kovpak he found work in the Communist Party. As he adapted to civilian life, he was very strict and fired from his post at an executive committee for being aggressive. He later worked as head of construction of the Mikhailovky hydroelectric power station before returning to Alma-Ata in 1949. After meeting with other Kazakh writers who wrote memoirs about the war he began working as a writer and attended the Higher Party School, and in 1953 he became the chief editor of the Kazakh State Publishing House of Fiction. In 1995 he was awarded the title Hero of Kazakhstan for his service in World War II. He died on 30 December 2006 at the age of 88.

== Literature ==
Qaysenov wrote many military themed books after the war, the first being "The Young Partisan" that was published in 1954. This followed by "Ilko Vitryak", "Partisans of Pereyaslavl", "In the jaws of death", "A boy behind enemy lines", "On the Dnieper", "Behind enemy lines", "Partisan paths", and many others.
