= Qayrat Umbetov =

Kazakh military officer

Major general Qairat Ümbetov
- Қайрат Жарылқасынұлы Үмбетов
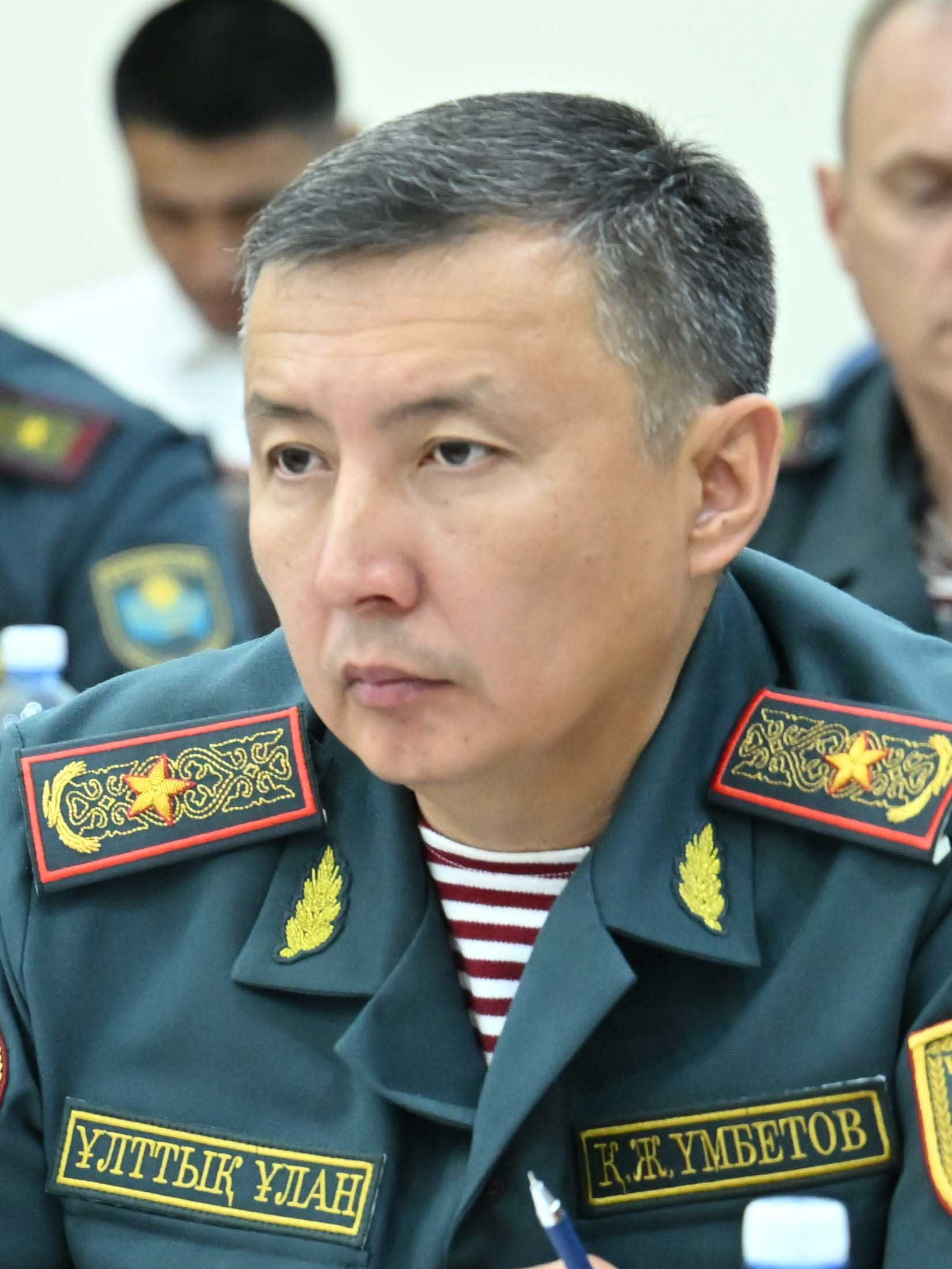
- Umbetov in 2023
- Born: 10 September 1977 (age 49); Chirchiq, Tashkent Region, Uzbek Soviet Socialist Republic, Soviet Union
- Military career
- Allegiance: Kazakhstan
- Branch: National Guard of Kazakhstan
- Service years: 1994–present
- Rank: Major general

Qairat Jarylqasynūly Ümbetov (Kazakh: Қайрат Жарылқасынұлы Үмбетов, born 10 September 1977) is a Kazakh military officer who has served as Deputy Commander-in-Chief of the National Guard for Morale, Welfare and Rights Advocacy since 2022.

Ümbetov is awarded People's Hero of Kazakhstan.

== Education ==
Chirchiq Higher Tank Command and Engineering School, specialty – Tactical Command of Engineering Services (1994-1998);

National University of Defense, specialty – Management of Combined Arms and Formations (2007–2009);

National University of Defense named after Elbasy, the first President of the Republic of Kazakhstan, specialty – Strategic Management in Military Science (2018).

== Biography ==
Qayrat Umbetov was born to a family of a military man in the town of Chirchiq, Tashkent Region (Uzbek SSR) on September 10, 1977. His father Zharylkasyn served in the internal troops of the USSR and then in formations of the Ministry of the Interior. In 1994 Qayrat decided to follow in his father's footsteps and applied to the Command and Tactics Dept. of Chirchiq Higher Tank Command and Engineering School. After graduating from the School, he rose through the ranks from commander of the anti-tank platoon of the 1st parachute Brigade to commander of a maneuver group in the Republic of Uzbekistan.

In 2001, Qayrat's family of origin moved to Kazakhstan, where he continued to serve in internal troops. Qayrat started his military career in Kazakhstan as a company commander, then came to the helm of a battalion HQ and 2 years later became a battalion commander.

Having proved himself as a professional, he continued to serve in various positions from commander to chief of staff in the internal troops of the Ministry of Internal Affairs (National Guard of Kazakhstan) in the cities of Pavlodar, Ust’-Kamenogorsk, Karaganda.

On April 7, 2016, while conducting combat exercises, Colonel Umbetov suffered multiple shrapnel wounds while covering with his body a young soldier who had ineptly thrown a live grenade.

For the courage and selflessness shown, he was awarded the title of Halyk Qaharmany by a presidential decree along with a sign of special distinction – the Gold Star and the Order of Otan. On May 31, 2022, Qayrat Umbetov was appointed Deputy Commander-in-Chief of the National Guard for Morale, Welfare and Rights Advocacy.

On May 5, 2023, he was granted the rank of Major General by the decree of Kassym-Jomart Tokayev, President of Kazakhstan.
