= Sholpan Zhandarbekova =

Kazakh actress (1922–2005)

Şolpan İsabekqyzy Jandarbekova (Note: Often transliterated as Sholpan Isabekyzy Zhandarbekova through a Russified Romanization of Шолпан Исабековна Жандарбекова.) (1 January 1922 – 14 September 2005) was a Kazakh actress and teacher, who was named People's Artist of the USSR in 1982.

== Early life and education ==
Sholpan Zhandarbekova was born on January 1, 1922 (according to other sources, on January 2, 1923) in Milibulak village, now Karkaralyn district, Karaganda region, Soviet Kazakhstan. In 1942, she graduated from the Theater and Art School in Alma-Ata.

== Career ==
Since 1941, Zhandarbekova was an actress at the Mukhtar Auezov Kazakh Drama Theater, where she worked until the end of her life. Zhandarbekova played more than 200 roles.

Since 1968, Zhandarbekova has been engaged in teaching activities. Since 1978, she has taught Actor's Mastery at T.K. Zhurgenov Kazakh National Academy of Arts, thereby significantly contributing to the training of future theater artists. She became a Professor in 1982.

Zhandarbekova acted in movies. She worked with film director Shaken Aymanov. For 17 years, she was the head of the local committee in the Mukhtar Auezov Kazakh Drama Theater. For ten years, Zhandarbekova was a military chief in the Almaty region, twice elected as a deputy of the Supreme Soviet of the Kazakh SSR.

Sholpan Zhandarbekova died on September 14, 2005 in Almaty. She is buried at the Kensai Cemetery.

== Family ==
Jandarbekova was married to Qūrmanbek Jandarbekov (1904–1973), theater and film actor, director, and singer, People's Artist of the Kazakh SSR (1936). They had two daughters, Aqtoty and Bota, and a son Aqqozy.

== Awards and honors ==
- Honored Artist of the Kazakh SSR (1945)
- People's Artist of the Kazakh SSR (1959)
- People's Artist of the USSR (1982)
- State Prize of the Kazakh SSR (1980), for the role of Azhar in the play Stronger than Death by Saken Zhunusov
- Order of the Red Banner of Labour, twice
- Order of Otan (2005)
- Medal "For Distinguished Labour"
- Four Certificates of Honor of the Supreme Soviet of the Kazakh SSR.

== Filmography ==
- 1945 – Abai Route - Magysh
- 1954 – Daughter of the Steppes - Ziyada
- 1954 – A Poem about Love - Bayan Sulu
- 1962 – Crossroads

== Commemoration ==
In 2013, a memorial plaque was opened in honor of Sholpan Zhandarbekova on the wall of house No. 42 on Jambyl Street in Almaty, where she lived.
