= Order of the Golden Eagle =

Highest order of Kazakhstan

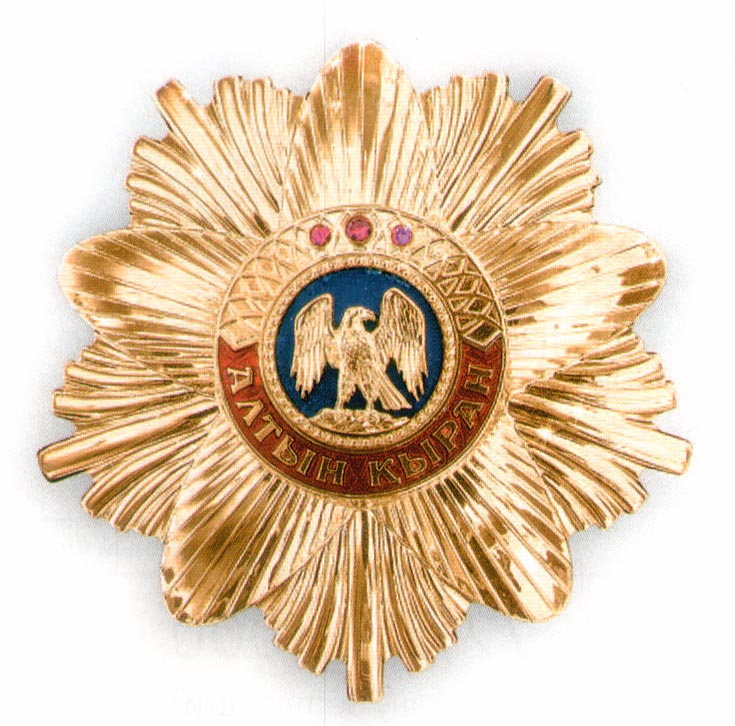
- Star of the order
- Type: State order
- Awarded for: Outstanding service to the Republic of Kazakhstan
- Presented by: the Kazakhstan
- Eligibility: Kazakh and foreign citizens
- Status: active
- Established: 1995
- Ribbon of the order

Precedence
- Next (higher): None (highest)
- Next (lower): Hero of Kazakhstan

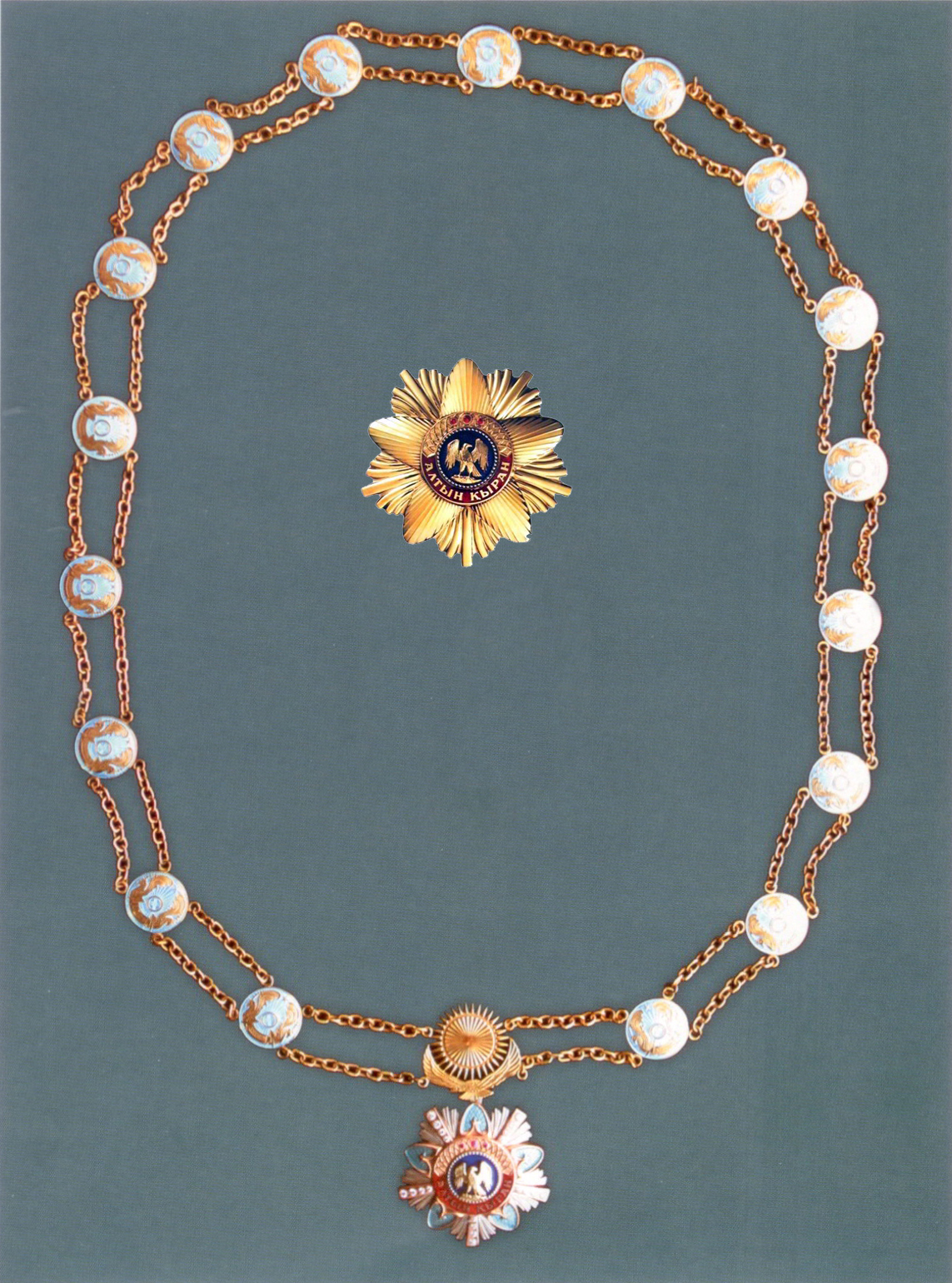
Star and collar of the order

The Order of the Golden Eagle or "Altyn Qyran" Order (Kazakh: Алтын Қыран ордені, Altyn Qyran ordenı; Russian: Орден Золотого орла) is the highest state decoration of Kazakhstan. The order is awarded by the President of Kazakhstan. Established in 1995, the order is awarded to heads of state and government, as well as citizens of Kazakhstan and the former Soviet Union, in recognition of their outstanding contribution to ensure the development of friendly relations between Kazakhstan and other nations. The Order of the Golden Eagle may be awarded to individuals who have previously been awarded orders by Kazakhstan or the Soviet Union. The President of the Republic of Kazakhstan becomes a Commander special class of the Order of Altyn Kyran.

== Notable recipients ==
- Boris Yeltsin, President of the Russian Federation (1997)
- Islam Karimov, President of Uzbekistan (1997)
- Jiang Zemin, General Secretary of the Chinese Communist Party and President of the People's Republic of China (1997)
- Leonid Kuchma, President of Ukraine (1999)
- Elizabeth II, Queen of the United Kingdom (2000)
- Gerhard Schröder, Chancellor of Germany (2003)
- Vladimir Putin, President of the Russian Federation (2004)
- Hosni Mubarak, President of Egypt (2008)
- Akihito, Emperor of Japan (2008)
- Khalifa bin Zayed Al Nahyan, Emir of Abu Dhabi and President of the UAE (2009)
- Tarja Halonen, President of Finland (2009)
- Lee Myung-bak, President of the Republic of Korea (2009)
- Nicolas Sarkozy, President of France (2009)
- Recep Tayyip Erdoğan, Prime Minister of Turkey (2012)
- Abdullah Gül, President of Turkey (2012)
- Juan Carlos I, King of Spain (2013)
- Kassym-Jomart Tokayev, President of Kazakhstan (2019)
- Ilham Aliyev, President of Azerbaijan (2022)
- Xi Jinping, General Secretary of the Chinese Communist Party and President of the People's Republic of China (2022)
- Salman of Saudi Arabia, King of Saudi Arabia and Custodian of the Two Holy Mosques (2022)
- Emomali Rahmon, President of Tajikistan (2023)
- Abdullah II of Jordan, King of Jordan (2024)
- Shavkat Mirziyoyev, President of Uzbekistan (2024)
- Nikol Pashinyan, Prime Minister of Armenia (2025)
- Aleksandar Vučić, President of Serbia (2026)
- Ukhnaagiin Khürelsükh, President of Mongolia (2026)

== See also ==
- Orders, decorations, and medals of Kazakhstan
