= Qairat Rysqulbekov =

Participant in the Jeltoqsan riot of 1986

- Қайрат Рысқұлбеков
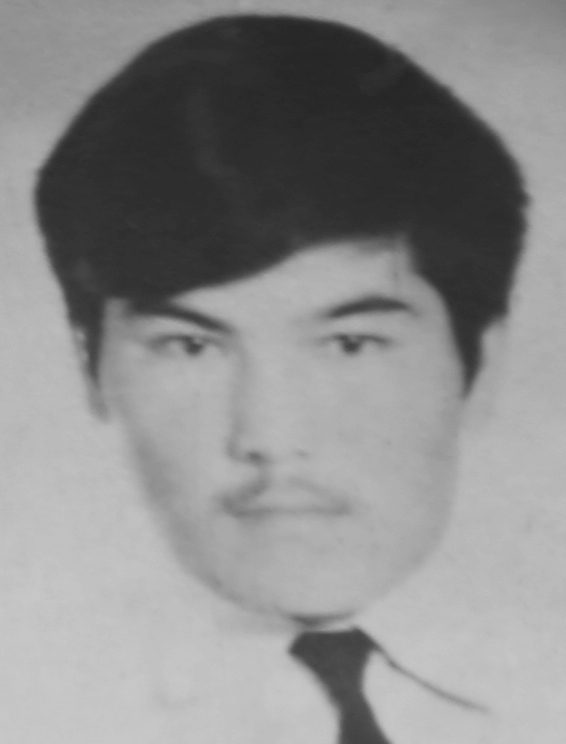
- Trade union card photo, 1986
- Born: 13 March 1966; Birlik, Moiynkum District, Jambyl Region, Kazakh SSR, Soviet Union
- Died: 21 May 1988 (aged 22); KGB cell No. 21, Semipalatinsk prison, Semipalatinsk Oblast, Kazakh SSR, Soviet Union
- Cause of death: Hanging with shirt, allegedly self-inflicted
- Awards: Hero of Kazakhstan; Order of Otan

Qairat Noğaibaiūly Rysqūlbekov (Kazakh: Қайрат Ноғайбайұлы Рысқұлбеков; 13 March 1966 – 21 May 1988) was a participant in the Jeltoqsan riot of 1986 that took place in Almaty, Kazakhstan. He later died in mysterious circumstances while held by the authorities. He was posthumously awarded the title Hero of Kazakhstan after independence.

== Early life ==
Rysqulbekov was born the sixth child to a large Kazakh family who lived and worked at the Kokterek collective farm in the Moiynkum District. Before the Jeltoqsan riots, he studied at a boarding school in Novotroitsk where he wrote for a student newspaper and was the leader of a Komsomol group. In addition to becoming a Komsomol secretary, he was active in sports. He graduated from high school in 1983 before applying to the Alma-Ata Architecture and Construction Academy, which he did not immediately attend. He briefly worked herding cattle before entering the military in 1984 and serving for two years, leaving while holding the rank of sergeant in August 1986.

== Activities at the Alma-Ata Architecture and Construction Academy ==
In autumn 1986 he entered the architecture academy in Alma-Ata that he had applied to in 1984 before serving in the military. His brother Nogaibai Rysqulbekov recalled that while Qairat found his studies at the school difficult he nevertheless remained active in public life. He became a member of the student trade union and the leader of a Komsomol detachment. Every Saturday the freshmen would meet up around a samovar, where they would listen to the radio and play the dombra.

=== Jeltoqsan protests ===
After the start of the Jeltoqsan uprisings on 17 December 1986 the students heard about the protests on the radio but were forbidden by the dean and administrators of the school from leaving the academy to join the protests. Nevertheless, Rysqulbekov and a group of other students left the campus for Brezhnev Square and told his father he was going. After the police attacked protestors with high-pressure water hoses they dispersed but soon a crowd moved to the building of the Writers' Union of Kazakhstan to meet with Olzhas Suleimenov. However, the entrances to the building were barricaded so Rysqulbekov and several other protesters relocated to the Kazakh Pedagogical Institute. In the process, officers of the KGB managed to photograph Rysqulbekov at the scene of the protests.

== Arrest and death ==
Rysqulbekov was arrested on 1 January 1987 based on his presence in a photograph taken at 9:30 am on the corner of Furmanov Street and Abai Avenue. The other people in the photo were identified as Tugelbai Tashenov, Dzambylbek Taijumaev, Ertai Kobespaev, and Kaiyrgeldy Kuzembaev. Kuzembaev, who lived to see independence, recalled reuniting with Rysqulbekov at the Supreme Court of the Kazakh SSR and Ryskulbekov telling him that he had been tricked into falsely confessing to the murder of radio operator Sergey Savitsky and the assault of a militiaman. Rysqulbekov told his family and friends the confession was false and that he had made it only because he would almost certainly be sentenced to death if he didn't confess and receive a reduced sentence. However, despite his confession, he was still sentenced to death at his trial.

Rysqulbekov openly admitted to attacking several police officers who had been beating young Kazakh women with batons, but insisted he used minimal force and never killed any police officers. He stated he acted on his feelings that no man should stand by while women were being beaten, and read out a poem requesting the prosecutor to be fair and take into account the fact he believed the protests would be peaceful. On 16 June 1987, Rysqulbekov was sentenced to death by shooting at the Supreme Court of the Kazakh SSR for the murder, in addition to prison time for his participation in the protests.

On 23 April 1988, his sentence was reduced to 20 years in prison, and he was eventually incarcerated at Semipalatinsk prison. Not long into his sentence on 21 May 1988, Rysqulbekov was found dead in his prison cell. The official cause of death at the time was determined to be suicide by hanging, but questions remained about the circumstances of his death. Rysqulbekov's cellmate, Leonid Vlasenko, allegedly confessed to murdering Rysqulbekov on the orders of the Ministry of Internal Affairs via a letter to the newspaper the Irtysh, but there are no records of the letter and the newspaper later denied ever receiving such a letter.

Rysqulbekov was buried in Semey. His family was not allowed to bury him in his birthplace of Birlik.

On 21 February 1992, Rysqulbekov was posthumously rehabilitated and on 9 December 1996 he was declared a Hero of Kazakhstan by decree of Nursultan Nazarbayev.
