= Order of the Leopard (Kazakhstan) =

Order of the Republic of Kazakhstan

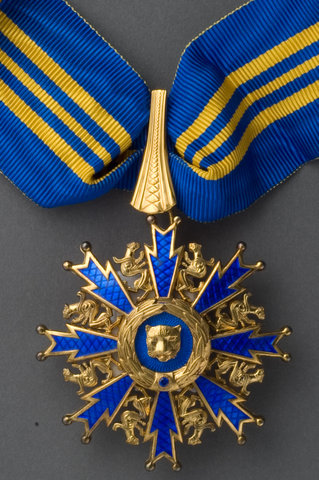
- Awarded for: Awarded for special merit in strengthening the national identity and sovereignty of the Republic of Kazakhstan; in providing of peace, consolidation of society and national unity of Kazakhstan; in state, industrial, scientific, social and cultural and public activity; or strengthening of cooperation between nations, rapprochement and mutual enrichment of national cultures, and friendly relations between states.
- Presented by: Kazakhstan
- Established: July 26 1999
- Ribbon bar

Precedence
- Next (higher): Order of Nazarbayev
- Next (lower): Order of Glory

Order of the Leopard (Kazakh: Барыс ордені, romanized: Barys ordenı) is an order of the Republic of Kazakhstan, established by the Law of the Republic of Kazakhstan dated July 26, 1999 No. 462-1.

== Regulation on the Order ==
This order is awarded for special merits:

- in strengthening the statehood and sovereignty of the Republic of Kazakhstan;
- in ensuring peace, consolidation of society and unity of the people of Kazakhstan;
- in state, industrial, scientific, socio-cultural and social activities;
- in strengthening cooperation between peoples, rapprochement and mutual enrichment of national cultures, friendly relations between states.

== Classes ==
The Order of Barys has three classes: Order "Barys" I class consists of a star and a badge on the shoulder ribbon – 100 mm wide. Order "Barys" II class consists of a sign on the chest block ribbon – 32 mm wide. Order "Barys" III class consists of a badge on the neck ribbon – 20 mm wide.

The highest degree of the order is the 1st degree. The award is made sequentially: III degree, II degree and I degree. In exceptional cases, for special distinctions, by decision of the head of state, awarding can be made without regard to sequence.

== See also ==
- Orders, decorations, and medals of Kazakhstan
