= Hero of Kazakhstan =

People's Hero of Kazakhstan
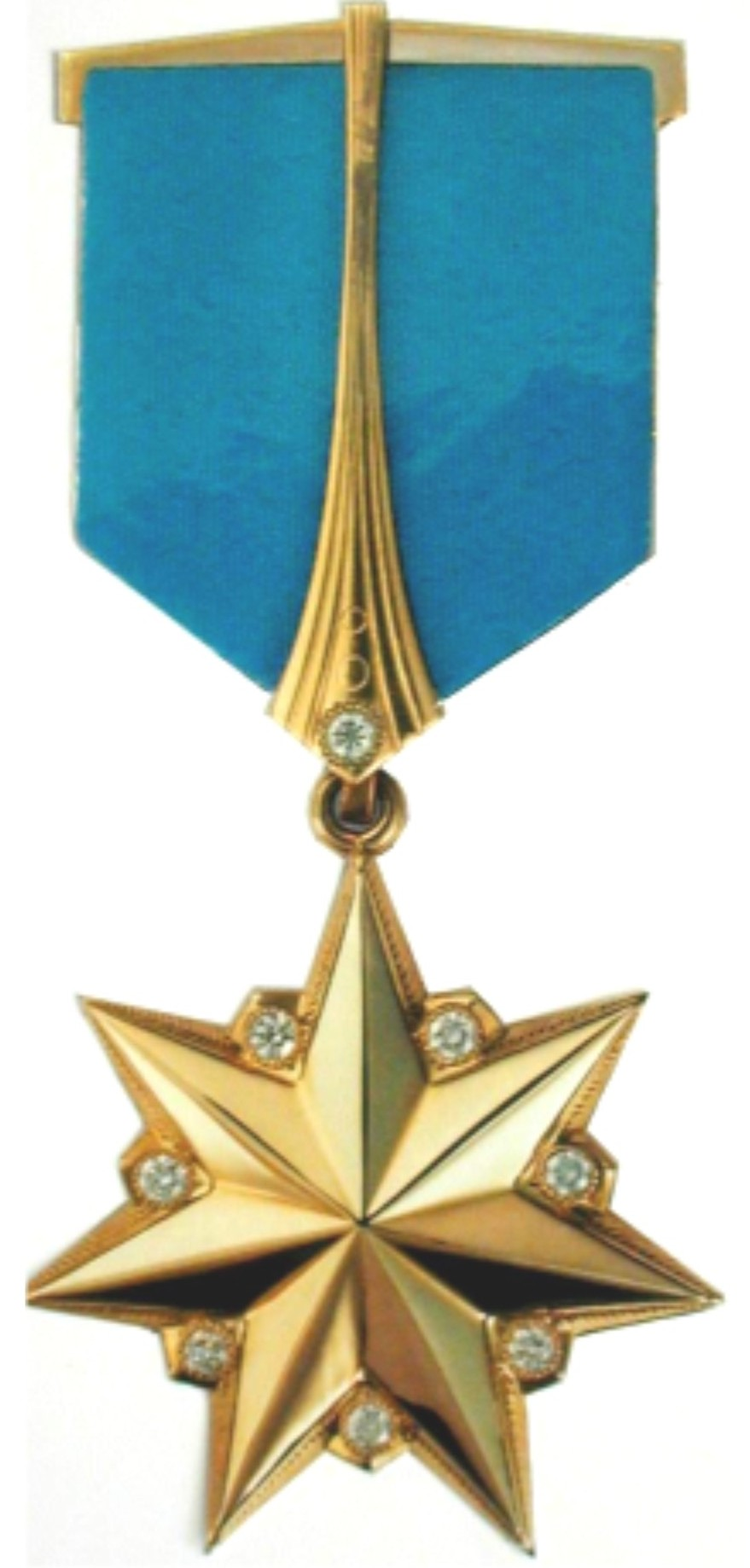
- Gold Star Medal of the award
- Type: Honorary title
- Awarded for: extraordinary service to the Republic of Kazakhstan, or civil or military exploits in its name
- Presented by: Kazakhstan
- Eligibility: Kazakh and foreign citizens
- Status: active
- Established: December 21, 1993
- First award: May 23, 1994

Precedence
- Next (higher): Order of the Golden Eagle
- Next (lower): Hero of Labour of Kazakhstan
- Related: Hero of the Russian Federation; Hero of Uzbekistan; Hero of Belarus

The title of People's Hero of Kazakhstan (Kazakh: Халық қаһарманы, romanized: Halyq qaharmany) is the highest distinction conferred by the Republic of Kazakhstan, along with the Order of the Golden Eagle.

== Overview ==
According to the Law on State Awards of the Republic of Kazakhstan, the honor would be bestowed on Kazakhstanis and foreigners who have performed extraordinary service to the Republic, or for exemplary military or civil exploits done in the name of its independence or freedom. Individuals who are granted the title also receive the Order of the Fatherland (Otan). People's Hero is the country's highest award, equaled only by the Order of the Golden Eagle. Those conferred with the title are awarded a special distinction – a gilded medal in the form of a seven-rayed star, with colorless Zirconium stones set between its rays. Recipients are exempt from property tax and other obligations.

The award was established by a decree of President Nursultan Nazarbayev on 21 December 1993. On 23 May 1994, Defense Minister Sagadat Nurmagambetov received the title, becoming the first People's Hero of Kazakhstan.

== Notable recipients ==
- Sagadat Nurmagambetov (1994)
- Qasim Qaysenov (1995)
- Toktar Aubakirov (1995)
- Talgat Musabayev (1995)
- Yuri Malenchenko (1995)
- Mukhtar Aliyev (1995)
- Shafik Chokin (1996)
- Roza Baglanova (1996)
- Qairat Rysqulbekov (1996, posthumously)
- Bakhtyuras Besikbayev (1998, posthumously)
- Rakhimzhan Qoshqarbaev (1999, posthumously)
- Azerbaijan Mambetov (2000)
- Khiuaz Dospanova (2004)
- Mukhtar Altynbayev (2006)
- Bakhytzhan Ertaev (2008)
- Baurzhan Momyshuly (posthumously)
- Qayrat Umbetov (2016)
- Nursultan Nazarbayev (2019)
- Ibragim Suleymanov (2022, posthumously)
- Tuleugali Abdybekov (2022, posthumously)

== See also ==
- Orders, decorations, and medals of Kazakhstan
