= Order of the Fatherland =

Order of the Republic of Kazakhstan

Order of Fatherland Отан орден
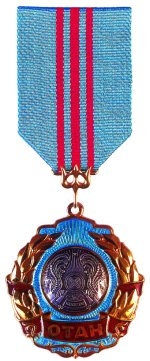
- Type: Order
- Awarded for: Outstanding service to the Republic of Kazakhstan
- Presented by: Republic of Kazakhstan
- Established: 1993
- Ribbon bar of the Order

Precedence
- Next (higher): Hero of Labour of Kazakhstan
- Next (lower): Order of the First President of the Republic of Kazakhstan

The Order of Fatherland (Kazakh: Отан ордені, trans. Otan ordeni, Order of the Fatherland) is one of the highest orders of the Republic of Kazakhstan. The order is usually awarded to citizens for the following, but there have been several notable non-citizen recipients.

- Outstanding achievements in public and social activities
- Development of economy, social sphere, science and culture
- State, law enforcement and military service
- Development of democracy and social progress

A commemorative 50 tenge coin featuring the medallion of the award on the reverse side was issued in 2007.

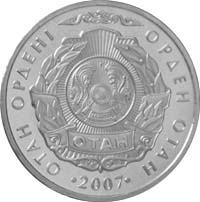

== Notable recipients ==
- Nursultan Nazarbayev
- Kassym-Jomart Tokayev
- Qairat Rysqulbekov
- Sagadat Nurmagambetov
- Kanat Saudabayev
- Khiuaz Dospanova
- Toktar Aubakirov
- Talgat Musabayev
- Roza Baglanova
- Shafik Chokin
- Mukhtar Altynbayev
- Yuri Malenchenko
- Mukhtar Aliyev
- Azerbaijan Mambetov
- Sholpan Zhandarbekova
- Qayrat Umbetov

== See also ==
- Orders, decorations, and medals of Kazakhstan
