= Kazakhstan Mint =

- Native name: Қазақстан теңге сарайы
- Company type: State enterprise
- Industry: Coin minting
- Founded: 1992
- Headquarters: Ulba Metallurgical Plant site, Oskemen, Kazakhstan
- Area served: Kazakhstan and internationally
- Products: Circulating coins, commemorative coins, bullion coins, medals, state awards
- Owner: National Bank of Kazakhstan
- Website: https://en.kazmint.kz

The Kazakhstan Mint is a state enterprise of Kazakhstan responsible for the production of circulating, commemorative and bullion coins, as well as state awards, orders and medals. It was established in 1992 and is located in Oskemen, on the site of the Ulba Metallurgical Plant.

== History ==
The Kazakhstan Mint was established in 1992 on the basis of the Ulba Metallurgical Plant in Oskemen to organise domestic production of coins for the newly introduced national currency, the Kazakhstani tenge.

In November 1992, by order of the National Bank of Kazakhstan, the enterprise produced its first batch of circulating coins, marking the beginning of local coin minting after earlier issues had been imported from abroad.

During the 1990s, the mint expanded its activities beyond circulating coinage to include commemorative and bullion coins, as well as the manufacture of state awards commissioned by the Presidential Administration of Kazakhstan. In 1998, it was reorganised as the republican state enterprise “Kazakhstan Mint of the National Bank of the Republic of Kazakhstan”, formally placing it under the authority of the National Bank.

From 1999, the mint began issuing proof-quality gold and silver coins, contributing to the development of Kazakhstan’s numismatic and precious-metal coin programmes.

The Kazakhstan Mint is recognised as the official mint of the National Bank of Kazakhstan and continues to operate in Oskemen, producing circulating, commemorative and bullion coins for domestic use and for international clients.

== Coinage ==
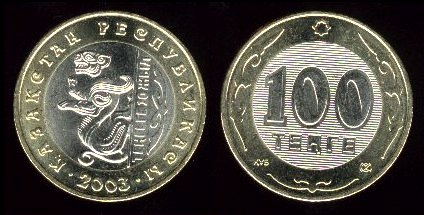
2003 commemorative 100 tenge coin minted by the Kazakhstan Mint

The Kazakhstan Mint produces circulating and non-circulating (commemorative and bullion) coins for the national currency, the Kazakhstani tenge. Circulating denominations include 1, 2, 5, 10, 20, 50, 100 and 200 tenge, which are issued by the National Bank of Kazakhstan and form part of the country’s cash circulation system.

According to the National Bank, as reported by The Astana Times, circulating coins are produced from a range of materials depending on denomination, including steel with copper-nickel coatings, cupronickel alloys and bimetallic combinations for higher denominations such as 100 and 200 tenge.

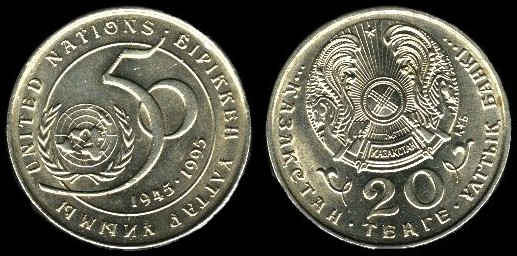
1995 commemorative coin issued for the 50th anniversary of the United Nations

In addition to regular circulation issues, the mint produces commemorative and collectible coins dedicated to historical events, anniversaries and cultural themes. These issues are struck in base and precious metals, including silver and gold, and are often issued in proof quality for collectors and investors.

== International activity ==
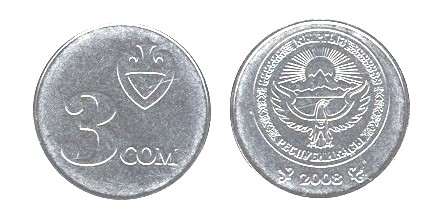
3 som coin of Kyrgyzstan (2008), minted by the Kazakhstan Mint

The Kazakhstan Mint also supplies coinage beyond Kazakhstan. It has produced circulation and commemorative coins under contract for foreign central banks, including the National Bank of the Kyrgyz Republic, whose som coinage has been minted there as part of its currency programmes.

In addition to central bank orders, the mint manufactures collectible and bullion coins for foreign numismatic companies and private clients, contributing to its role as a mint serving both domestic and international markets.
