= Hero of Labour of Kazakhstan =

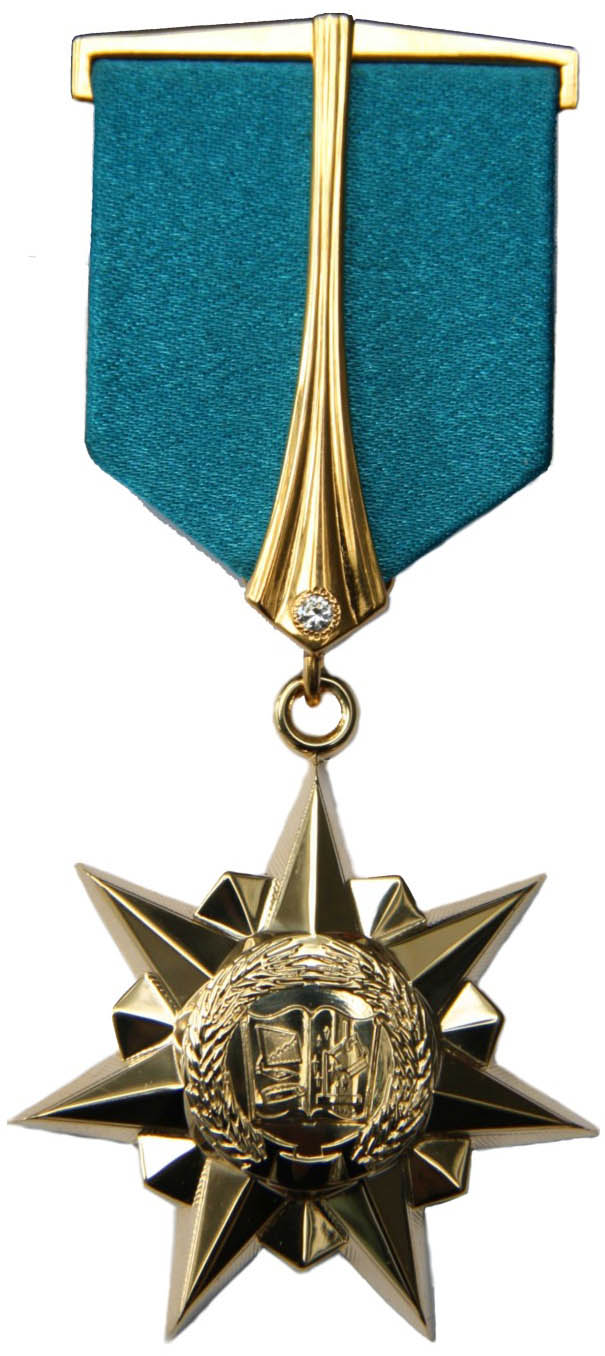
- Medallion of the award
- Type: Honorary title
- Awarded for: extraordinary service to the Republic of Kazakhstan in the fields of economic, social, and human development
- Presented by: Kazakhstan
- Eligibility: Kazakh and foreign citizens
- Status: active
- Established: 1 December 2008
- First award: 16 December 2008

Highlights
- Total: 26

Precedence
- Next (higher): Hero of Kazakhstan
- Related: Hero of Labour of the Russian Federation

Hero of Labour of Kazakhstan (Kazakh: Қазақстанның Еңбек Ері, romanized: Qazaqstannyñ Eñbek Erı) is one of the highest titles of Kazakhstan, awarded for notable achievements in the economic and social development of the country. Recipients of the award are also awarded the Order of Otan. The award was established on 1 December 2008 and first awarded on 16 December 2008 after a presidential decree on 5 December. Not to be confused with the Order of Labor Glory, it is the successor of the Soviet title Hero of Socialist Labour and the civil variant of the Hero of Kazakhstan award.

== Description of the medallion ==
The medallion of the award consists of a seven-pointed star with a wreath of wheat in the center surrounding an image of an open book in the background, with a computer in front of the left page and a ladle pouring molten metal in front of the right page, engraved on the obverse side. The reverse side of the medallion contains the inscription "Қазақстанның Еңбек Ері" (Hero of Labour of Kazakhstan). The medallion is suspended from a pentagonal metal plate partially covered by a blue ribbon 41 mm tall and 34 mm wide.

== Notable recipients ==
26 people have received the award, including the following:

- Nursultan Nazarbayev, former president of Kazakhstan
- Sergey Tereshchenko, former prime minister
- Abish Kekilbayev, writer
- Olzhas Suleimenov, poet and anti-nuclear activist
- Akhmetzhan Yessimov, former mayor of Almaty
- Zhaqsylyq Üshkempirov, Olympic gold medalist
- Serik Akshulakov, neurosurgeon
- Yuri Pyat, cardiovascular surgeon

== See also ==
- Orders, decorations, and medals of Kazakhstan
- Hero of Socialist Labour (Soviet era predecessor)
