= Commander-in-Chief of the Ground Forces (Kazakhstan) =

Commander-in-Chief of the Kazakh Ground Forces
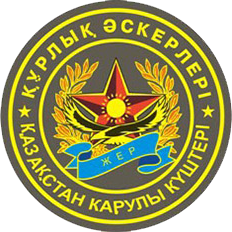
- Incumbent; Major General Mereke Kuchekbaev since 26 November 2024
- Ministry of Defense
- Style: Comrade
- Status: Active
- Member of: Security Council of Kazakhstan
- Reports to: Chief of the General Staff
- Residence: Astana, Kazakhstan
- Appointer: President of Kazakhstan
- Term length: No fixed length
- Constituting instrument: Constitution of Kazakhstan
- Precursor: Commanders-in-Chief of the Soviet Ground Forces
- Formation: February 1994

The Commander-in-Chief of the Ground Forces (Kazakh: Құрлық әскерлерінің бас қолбасшысы, romanized: Qūrlyq äskerlerınıñ bas qolbasşysy; Russian: Главнокомандующий сухопутными войсками) is the professional head of the Kazakh Ground Forces. They are responsible for the administration and the operational control of the Ground Forces.

== History of the office ==
The position of the Commander of the Ground Forces, as well as the state institution that is the Directorate of the Commander of the Ground Forces did not exist from July 2000 to June 2002 and from November 2004 to April 2009. In the indicated periods, the Ground Forces of Kazakhstan did not have their own centralized command and control body. On 14 June 2002, the office was created. The ground forces, in addition to regional commands, were subordinate to the Committee of the Chiefs of Staff of the armed forces.

== List of Commanders ==
No.	Portrait	Chief of the General Staff	Took office	Left office	Time in office	Ref.
1	Fedor Shcherbakov	Fedor Shcherbakov (1947–2022)	February 1994	6 July 2000	6 years, 5 months	
Position unfilled (14 June 14, 2002 – 15 September 2003)
2	Nurlan Jolamanov	Lieutenant general Nurlan Jolamanov (born 1956)	15 September 2003	12 November 2004	1 year, 1 month	
4	Saken Zhasuzakov	Major general Saken Zhasuzakov (born 1957)	1 April 2009	11 March 2010	11 months	
5	Murat Maikeyev	Major general Murat Maikeyev (born 1959)	11 March 2010	28 September 2016	5 years, 6 months	
6	Murat Bektanov	Major general Murat Bektanov (born 1965)	28 September 2016	4 May 2019	2 years, 7 months	
7	Marat Khusainov	Major general Marat Khusainov (born 1967)	4 May 2019	5 November 2020	1 year, 6 months	
8	Talgat Koibakov	Major General; Talgat Koibakov	5 November 2020	25 September 2023	2 years, 10 months	
9	Asan Zhusupov	Lieutenant General; Asan Zhusupov	25 September 2023	26 November 2024	1 year, 2 months	
10	Mereke Kuchekbaev	Major General; Mereke Kuchekbaev	26 November 2024	Incumbent	1 year, 9 months	
