= Astana Medal =

Commemorative medal of the Republic of Kazakhstan

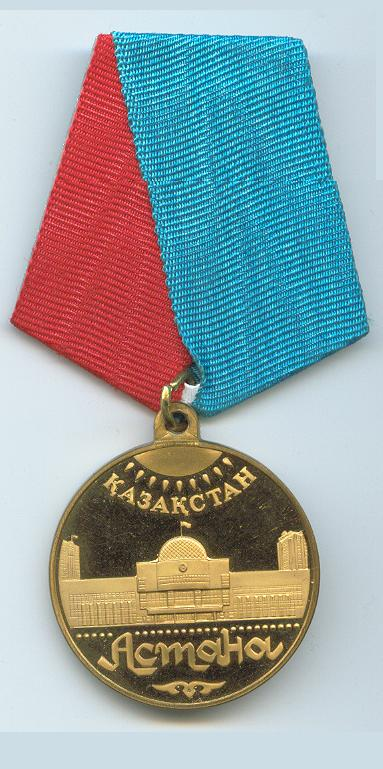
- Astana Medal
- Type: Medal
- Awarded for: a significant contribution to the social and economic development of Kazakhstan, construction and infrustructural development of Astana, the capital of the Republic of Kazakhstan
- Presented by: Kazakhstan
- Eligibility: Kazakhstanis and foreign citizens
- Established: June 2, 1998
- Ribbon of the Astana Medal

Precedence
- Next (lower): Medal for Military Valour

The Astana Medal is a commemorative medal of the Republic of Kazakhstan, established by Presidential Decree No. 3963, dated 2 June 1998, in celebration of the presentation of the new capital of Kazakhstan.

== Regulation on the Medal ==
The Astana Medal is conferred upon citizens of the Republic of Kazakhstan and foreign nationals for significant contributions to the social and economic development of Kazakhstan, and to the construction and infrastructural development of the capital of Kazakhstan.

== Description ==
The Astana commemorative medal is made of tombac alloy in the shape of a circle 34 mm in diameter.

The obverse side carries an image of the official residence of the President of the Republic of Kazakhstan in Astana. The background is adorned with a depiction of the Kazakhstani Parliament on the left and a high-rise building on the right. The upper part of the medal shows a fragment of the sun as seen in the National Flag of the Republic of Kazakhstan, with the word Қазақстан (Kazakhstan) below it. The lower part of the medal has the word Астана (Astana) written in a Turkic font above a national ornament.

The reverse side of the medal depicts a mythical winged snow leopard at the centre, with 1998 inscribed below. The rim is adorned with the words СТОЛИЦА (capital), АСТАНА (Astana), and CAPITAL, separated by asterisks.

The medal connects to its pentagonal ribboned back board with a ring and a suspension. The height and maximum width of the back board both equal 50 mm. The left ribbon is red, and the right one is blue, the colour of the Kazakhstani flag.

Medals are produced by the Kazakhstan Mint.

== See also ==
- Orders, decorations, and medals of Kazakhstan
