= Mukhtar Aliyev =

Soviet and Kazakh surgeon

- Мұхтар Әлиев

Minister of Healthcare
- In office 1982–1987

Personal details
- Born: 2 February 1933 Tyumen-Aryk station, Janakorgan District, South Kazakhstan Region, Kazakh SSR, Soviet Union
- Died: 12 January 2015 (aged 81) Almaty, Kazakhstan
- Party: Nur Otan
- Spouse: Minawar Aliyeva
- Children: 2
- Education: Academy of Sciences of the Republic of Kazakhstan; Academy of Medical Sciences of the Republic of Kazakhstan
- Awards: Hero of Kazakhstan; Order of the Fatherland; Medal "Veteran of Labour"

Mūhtar Äliūly Äliev (Note: Often transliterated as Mukhtar Aliyevich Aliyev through a Russified Romanization of Мухтар Алиевич Алиев.) (Kazakh: Мұхтар Әлиұлы Әлиев; 2 February 1933 – 12 January 2015) was a Soviet and Kazakh surgeon, Doctor of Medical Sciences (1974), founder of the Academy of Medical Sciences of the Republic of Kazakhstan (1995), and Hero of Kazakhstan (1995).

== Biography ==
Born in Tyumen-Aryk, Janakorgan District, Kyzylorda Region on 2 February 1933.

Mukhtar Aliyev graduated from Turkestan Teacher Training College in 1950 and taught at a village school in Timur, Chymkent region, for a year. In 1951, he enrolled at Alma-Ata State Medical Institute. Upon graduation, he started his medical career as a surgeon in a village hospital. Having completed his doctoral studies in Almaty and received a scientific degree of assistant professor, he became the chief surgeon of the Ministry of Health of the Kazakh SSR, and later became the head of the ministry.

In 1998, he founded and became the first president of the International Academy of Medical Sciences (Brussels, Belgium). He also headed the Research Institute of Clinical and Experimental Surgery and Scientific Center of Surgery named after A. N. Syzganov.

During his career as a surgeon, Mukhtar Aliyev performed 16,000 surgeries. Aliyev's name is inextricably linked to the achievements of Kazakhstani thoracic, abdominal, vascular and microsurgery, he made a major contribution to healthcare in Kazakhstan. He was the first surgeon in the country to perform over 50 surgeryaorto-coronary bypasses at ischemic heart disease. He was also the first to conduct endoscopic removal of gall bladders, ovarian cysts, adrenal glands and Mukhtar Aliyev also initiated founding of the Republican Organ Transplantation Center. Under Aliyev's supervision, 70 doctoral dissertations and 83 PhD theses were defended. He authored 970 scientific works, including 59 monographs, and held 155 certificates of authorship. 18 employees of the Scientific Center of Surgery have been awarded state prizes. He was elected a deputy of the Supreme Council three times. On his initiative, draft laws "On the protection of the health of the people", "On medical insurance", "Sanitary Code" were developed.

In early 2008 Mukhtar Aliyev went to Austria to have his heart operated, and turned to the embassy of Kazakhstan in Vienna in May 2008 stating that his son Rakhat was keeping him from returning home. He returned to Kazakhstan in October 2009.

Aliyev died of heart disease aged 81 on 12 January 2015. He was buried at the Kensai Cemetery in Almaty.

== Family ==
- Wife - Minavar Aliyeva;
- Son — Rakhat Aliyev, ex-husband of Dariga Nazarbayeva;
- Daughter — Gulshat Mukhtarovna Khorani (nee — Alieva), married to Lebanese businessman Issam Solah Khorani.

== Publications ==
Books by Mukhtar Aliyev:

- Arterial Plasticity in Combined Radiolesion (1979);
- Diagnostic and Surgical Thoracoscopy (1988);
- Diagnostics and Treatment of Esophageal Lesions (1991);
- The immunity in surgery of the ulcer disease (1991);
- Adequacy of General Anesthesia (1992);
- The clinical microsurgery (1994);
- A Surgeon's Manual (1997);
- Surgery Handbook (1997).

== Awards ==
- People's Hero of Kazakhstan (1995);
- Order of Otan (1995);
- Veteran of Labour award (1987);
- Medal 2000 intellectuals of the 21st Century (2001);
- 500 Founders of the 21st Century Gold Medal (IBC, Cambridge, England, 2001).
