= Orders, decorations, and medals of Kazakhstan =

The system of orders, decorations, and medals of the Republic of Kazakhstan has its origins in the Law of the Republic of Kazakhstan No. 2676 dated December 12, 1995 titled "On State Awards of the Republic of Kazakhstan." Awards have been modified and added over time. The system has similarities to other countries that were formerly part of the Soviet Union.

== Highest awards ==
Award	Name (English/Kazakh)	Decree or law	Inception or amendment date	Award criteria
	Order of the Golden Eagle Алтын Қыран ордені Altyn Qyran	No. 2676	12 December 1995	For outstanding service to the Republic of Kazakhstan.
"Hero of Labour of the Russian Federation"	Hero of Kazakhstan Халық қаһарманы Halyq qaharmany	No. 2676	12 December 1995	Awarded for extraordinary service, or civil or military exploits in the name of the Republic of Kazakhstan.
	Hero of Labour of Kazakhstan Қазақстанның Еңбек Ері Qazaqstannyń Eńbek Eri		8 December 2008	Awarded for outstanding achievements in the economic, social, and human development of the Republic of Kazakhstan.

== Orders of the Republic of Kazakhstan ==
Award	Name (English/Kazakh)	Decree or law	Inception or amendment date	Award criteria
	Order of the Fatherland «Отан» ордені Otan		1993	Awarded for outstanding achievements in public and social activities; in the development of economy, social sphere, science and culture; in the state, law enforcement and military service, the development of democracy and social progress.
	Order of the First President of the Republic of Kazakhstan «Қазақстан Республикасының Тұңғыш Президенті Нұрсұлтан Назарбаев» ордені Qazaqstan Respýblıkasynyń Tuńǵysh		1 January 2001	Awarded for special merit in state and public activity promoting the prosperity and glory of the Republic of Kazakhstan. For special service to the Republic of Kazakhstan heads of state and leaders of foreign governments of may be awarded the order.
	Order of the Leopard 1st Class «Барыс» орден I дәрежелі Barys ordeni	No. - No.	1999	Awarded for special merit in strengthening the national identity and sovereignty of the Republic of Kazakhstan; in providing of peace, consolidation of society and national unity of Kazakhstan; in state, industrial, scientific, social and cultural and public activity; or strengthening of cooperation between nations, rapprochement and mutual enrichment of national cultures, and friendly relations between states.
	Order of the Leopard 2nd Class «Барыс» орден II дәрежелі Barys ordeni	No. - No.	1999	Awarded for special merit in strengthening the national identity and sovereignty of the Republic of Kazakhstan; in providing of peace, consolidation of society and national unity of Kazakhstan; in state, industrial, scientific, social and cultural and public activity; or strengthening of cooperation between nations, rapprochement and mutual enrichment of national cultures, and friendly relations between states.
	Order of the Leopard 3rd Class «Барыс» орден III дәрежелі Barys ordeni	No. - No.	1999	Awarded for special merit in strengthening the national identity and sovereignty of the Republic of Kazakhstan; in providing of peace, consolidation of society and national unity of Kazakhstan; in state, industrial, scientific, social and cultural and public activity; or strengthening of cooperation between nations, rapprochement and mutual enrichment of national cultures, and friendly relations between states.
	Order of Glory 1st Class «Даңқ» орден I дәрежелі Dańq ordenі		1996	Awarded to high-ranking military officials of the Armed Forces, other troops and military formations, as well as management staff of the prosecution, National Security, and Internal Affairs of the Republic of Kazakhstan for achievements in leadership and command and control, high combat readiness of the troops and ensuring the country's defense; or for the excellent organization of military, external and internal service, guaranteeing national security, enforcement of law and public order.
	Order of Glory 2nd Class «Даңқ» орден II дәрежелі Dank ordenі		1996	Awarded to high-ranking military officials of the Armed Forces, other troops and military formations, as well as management staff of the prosecution, National Security, and Internal Affairs of the Republic of Kazakhstan for achievements in leadership and command and control, high combat readiness of the troops and ensuring the country's defense; or for the excellent organization of military, external and internal service, guaranteeing national security, enforcement of law and public order.
	Order of Valor 1st Class I дәрежелі «Айбын» орден Aibyn ordenі		1995	Awarded to company and field grade officers for success, achieved in combat training, maintenance of high military combat readiness of forces and learning of new military techniques, providing of legitimacy and protection of public peace; or for bravery and dedication during call of military duty and also for feats, committed under protection of state interests.
	Order of Valor 2nd Class II дәрежелі «Айбын» ордені Aıbyn ordenі		1995	Awarded to company and field grade officers for success, achieved in combat training, maintenance of high military combat readiness of forces and learning of new military techniques, providing of legitimacy and protection of public peace; or for bravery and dedication during call of military duty and also for feats, committed under protection of state interests.
	Order of Valor 3rd Class III дәрежелі «Айбын» ордені Aıbyn ordenі		1995	Awarded to non-commissioned officers and other ranks for success, achieved in combat training, maintenance of high military combat readiness of forces and learning of new military techniques, providing of legitimacy and protection of public peace; or for bravery and dedication during call of military duty and also for feats, committed under protection of state interests.
	Order of Nobility Парасат ордені Parasat ordeni		1993	Awarded for merit in the fields of science, culture, literature and art, as well as statesmen and public figures, defenders of human rights, and others who have contributed to the spiritual or intellectual potential of Kazakhstan.
	Order of Friendship, 1st Class I дәрежелі Достық ордені Dostyq ordeni		1995	Awarded for the promotion of international and civil consensus in society and the promotion of peace, friendship and cooperation between peoples.
	Order of Friendship, 2nd Class II дәрежелі Достық ордені Dostyq ordeni		1995	Awarded for the promotion of international and civil consensus in society and the promotion of peace, friendship and cooperation between peoples.
	Order of Honour Құрмет ордені Qurmet ordeni		1993	Awarded for merit in the fields of economics, science, culture, social issues, and education.

== Medals of the Republic of Kazakhstan ==
Award	Name (English/Kazakh)	Decree or law	Inception or amendment date	Award criteria
	Altyn Alka Алтын алқа Altyn Alka		1995	Awarded to mothers of seven children.
	Astana Medal Астана медалі Astana medali	No. 3963	2 June 1998	Awarded to citizens of the Republic of Kazakhstan and foreign citizens who have made a significant contribution to the socioeconomic development of Kazakhstan, in the arrangement and construction of Astana, the capital of the Republic of Kazakhstan.
	Kumis Alka Күміс алқа Kumis Alka		1995	Awarded to mothers of six children.
	Medal for Military Valour Жауынгерлік epлiгi үшін медалі Jaýyngerlik erligi úshin medali	No. 2676	12 December 1995	Awarded to military personnel of the armed forces, as well as other troops of military formations of the Republic of Kazakhstan, employees of the Prosecutor's Office, National Security, the Interior Ministry, and the penal system of the Ministry of Justice of the Republic of Kazakhstan. It is awarded for skillful initiative and bold actions in combat, contributing to the successful accomplishment of combat missions of military units, as well as in the fight against crime; for their courage in defending the state border; or for services while serving.
	Medal for Courage Ерлігі үшін медалі	No. 2676	12 December 1995	Awarded for courage and selflessness shown in extreme situations, related to saving human life; or in the fight against crime.
	Medal for Distinguished Labor Ерен еңбегі үшін медалі Eren eńbegi úshin medali	No. 2676	12 December 1995	Awarded for labor achievements in the economy, social sphere, science, culture and public service.
	Medal of Charity Шапағат медалі Shapaǵat medali	No. 2676	12 December 1995	Awarded for great works of charity and mercy.
	People's Gratitude medal Халық алғысы медалі Halyk alǵysy medalі		8 June 2020	Awarded to citizens of the Republic of Kazakhstan, fruitfully working in the fields of education, healthcare, social protection, and who have distinguished themselves especially in the fight against the pandemic COVID-19.
	30th Anniversary of the Independence of the Republic of Kazakhstan Jubilee Medal Қазақстан Республикасының Тәуелсіздігіне 30 жыл медалі Qazaqstan Respwblïkasınıñ Täwelsizdigine 30 jıl medali	No. 575	17 May 2021	Awarded to citizens of the Republic of Kazakhstan and foreign citizens, who have made a significant contribution to the formation of statehood, strengthening of sovereignty and socio-economic development of the Republic of Kazakhstan.
