= Order of Nazarbayev =

Order of the Republic of Kazakhstan

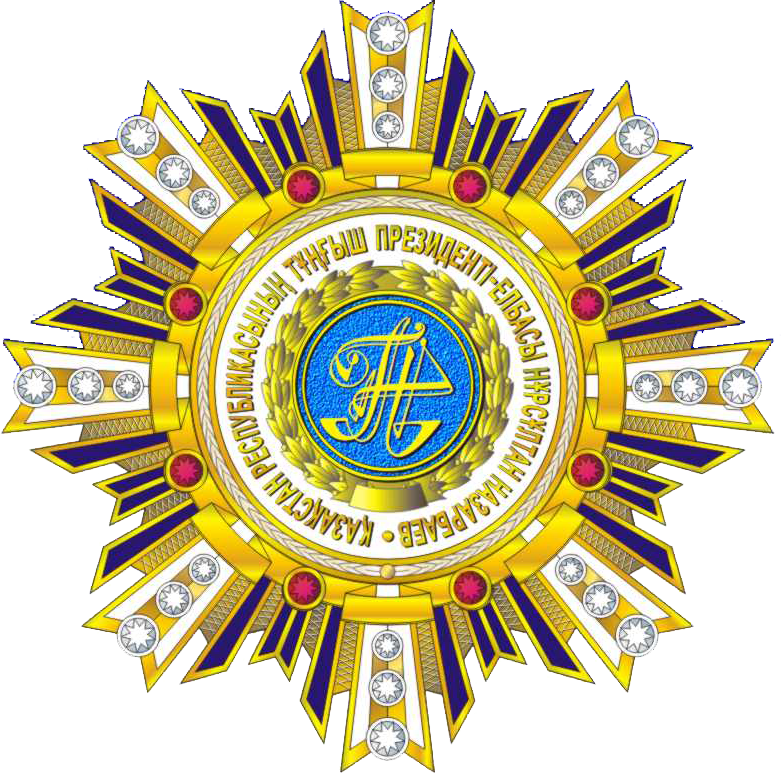
- Type: Award
- Awarded for: Special merits in society
- Country: Kazakhstan
- Presented by: Kazakhstan
- Eligibility: Kazakh and foreign citizens
- Established: 1 January 2001
- Ribbon bar of the award

Precedence
- Next (higher): Order of Otan
- Next (lower): Order of the Leopard

The Order of the First President of Kazakhstan – Leader of the Nation Nursultan Nazarbayev (Kazakh: Қазақстан Республикасының Тұңғыш Президенті — Елбасы Нұрсұлтан Назарбаев ордені, romanized: Qazaqstan Respublikasynyñ Tūñğyş Prezidentı — Elbasy Nūrsūltan Nazarbaev ordenı), also referred to simply as the Order of Nazarbayev, is a state award of the Republic of Kazakhstan. It was established on 1 January 2001 in honor of President Nursultan Nazarbayev who was at the time, the first and only President of Kazakhstan.

It is awarded to Kazakh and foreign citizens for contributions to the development and prosperity of the country. This includes any of the following actions:

- Participation in social activities
- Achievements in sport and other competition on behalf of Kazakhstan
- Contributions to the development of a strong economy
- Distinguished service in national law enforcement and military bodies

The order changed its design four times since its inception, from the sign on the cervical tape to the mark on the shoulder ribbon with the star.

== List of recipients ==
- Kassym-Jomart Tokayev (2004)
- Vladimir Putin (2019)
- Sooronbay Jeenbekov (2019)
- Alexander Lukashenko (2019)
- Nurlan Nigmatulin (2015)
- Imangali Tasmagambetov (2004)
- Abish Kekilbayev (2004)
- Vladimir Shkolnik
- Gennady Golovkin
- Talgat Musabayev
- Baktykozha Izmukhambetov
- Viktor Khrapunov
- Bulat Utemuratov
- Karim Massimov
- Daniyal Akhmetov

== Gallery ==
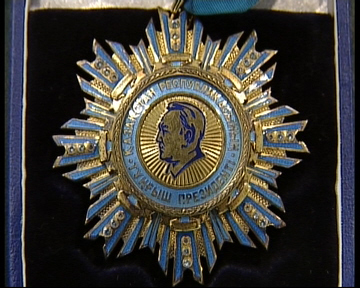
Badge of the 1st Degree

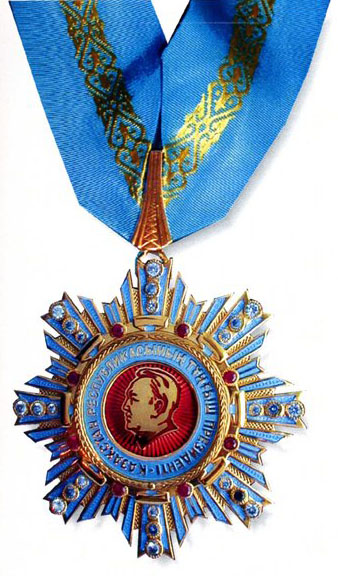
Badge of the 2nd Degree

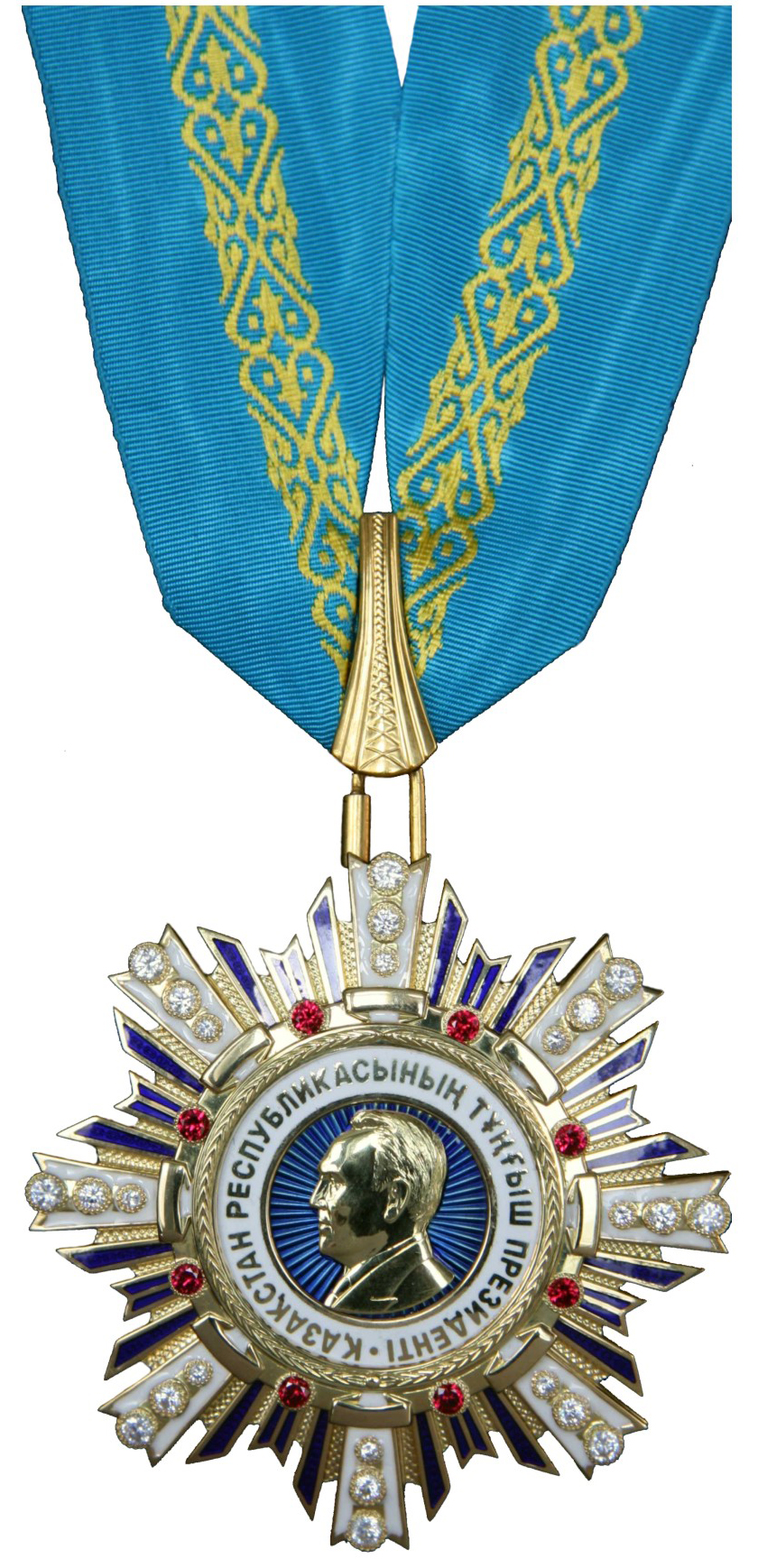
Badge of the 3rd Degree

Miniature version of the order

== See also ==
- Orders, decorations, and medals of Kazakhstan
