= Order of Valor (Kazakhstan) =

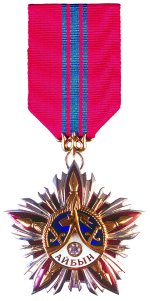
- Order of Valor of the Kazakhstan
- Type: Order
- Awarded for: members of the armed forces, other military formations and units, as well as personnel of prosecution, national security, internal affairs and penal systems of the Republic of Kazakhstan
- Presented by: Kazakhstan
- Eligibility: Kazakh and foreign citizens
- Status: active
- Established: December 12, 1995
- Ribbon of the order

Precedence
- Next (higher): Order of Glory
- Next (lower): Order of Parasat

The Order of Valor (Kazakh: Айбын ордені, romanized: Aibyn ordenı, trans. Order of Aybyn) is a military decoration of the Republic of Kazakhstan.

The Order of Aybyn is conferred upon members of the armed forces, other military formations and units, as well as personnel of the prosecution, national security, internal affairs, and penal systems of the Republic of Kazakhstan:

- for achievements in combat training, sustaining high combat readiness, mastering new military equipment, and maintaining law and order;
- for valour and total dedication in the line of military and service duty, as well as feats of heroism performed in the protection of national interests.

== History ==
The Order of Aybyn was established by Law No. 2676, 'On State Awards of the Republic of Kazakhstan', dated 12 December 1995. It initially provided for two classes, but Law No. 462-1, dated 26 July 1999, added a higher class and made changes to the order's design.

== Classes ==
The Order of Valor consists of three classes:

- Order of Aybyn, Class I;
- Order of Aybyn, Class II;
- Order of Aybyn, Class III.

Orders of Aybyn, Class I and II, are conferred upon low-ranking and field-grade officers. Class I, as the highest rank, can only be conferred upon holders of Class II.

Order of Aybyn, Class III, is conferred upon soldiers, seamen, sergeants, sergeant majors, warrant officers, and ensigns.

== Order description ==
=== Type 1 (pre-1999) ===
The order was made of silver in the shape of an eight-pointed mullet (opposite points being 45 mm apart), with a circular centre adorned with a shield covering symbols of arms, and with the word АЙБЫН (Aybyn) written against a cherry-red background at the bottom.

The order was awarded in two classes. Class I has gold plating on top of dark blue grand feu enamel; Class II has the front part made of tinted silver against a backdrop of turquoise grand feu enamel.

A suspension and suspension ring connect the order to a pentagonal brass top bar. The top bar has a height of 36.5 mm and a width of 38 mm; the upper and lower frames are wrapped with a red ribbon with yellow stripes.

=== Type 2 (post-1999) ===
The Class I order is a stylised five-pointed star whose rays are separated by silver protrusions, covered with red enamel, and bear gold spearheads. The medal's centrepiece is a round medallion divided into three parts by a stylised triangle. A diamond is set in the central white enamel part, with АЙБЫН written below in gold letters; the side parts depict gold sword grips on dark blue enamel.

The Class II order is an eight-pointed star with dual-edged rays and a decorative ridge. A round, red enamel-filled medallion in the centre depicts a round shield covering two crossed sabres; a decorative ornamental element below has a blue enamel ribbon inscribed with АЙБЫН. Medal elements not covered with enamel are gold-plated.

The Class III order is similar to Class II, but its non-enamelled elements are made of oxidised silver. A decorative ring connects the medal to a hexagonal top bar adorned with a red order ribbon bearing three blue stripes in the centre.

== Order coin ==
The Kazakhstan Mint produced a commemorative coin depicting the Order of Aybyn, Class I, in 2008.

== Gallery ==
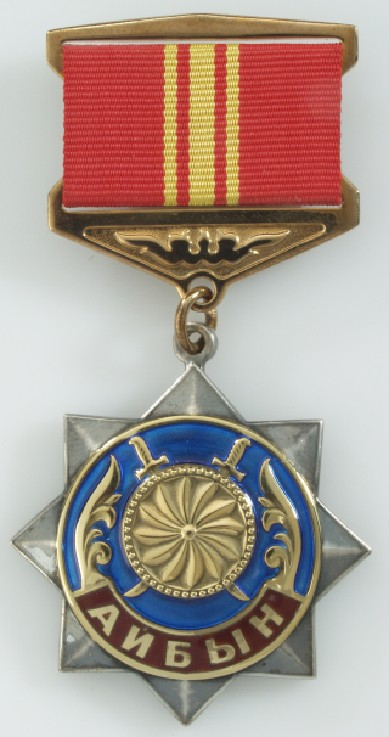
Aybyn Class I medal (Type 1)

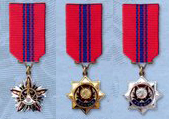
Class I, II and III miniatures

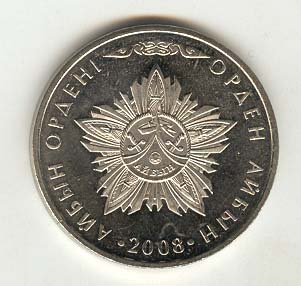
50 tenge coin depicting Order of Aybyn Class I

== See also ==
- Orders, decorations, and medals of Kazakhstan
