= Bakhtyuras Besikbayev =

Kazakh Soviet pilot

- Бақтыораз Бесікбаев
- Born: 1920; Ilinskoe village, Turkestan ASSR, Russian SFSR, Soviet Union (now Kazakhstan)
- Died: 26 June 1941 (aged 20–21); Dekshnyan, Byelorussian SSR, Soviet Union (now Belarus)
- Military career
- Allegiance: Soviet Union
- Branch: Soviet Air Force
- Rank: Junior Sergeant
- Unit: 207th Long-Range Bomber Aviation Regiment
- Conflicts: Battle of Białystok–Minsk
- Awards: Hero of Kazakhstan; Hero of the Russian Federation; Order of the Patriotic War, 1st Class

Bakhtyuras Shampekuly Besikbayev (Kazakh: Бақтыораз Шәмпекұлы Бесікбаев, romanized: Baqtyoraz Şämpekūly Besıkbaev; 1920 – 26 June 1941) was a gunner and radio operator in the 207th Long-Range Bomber Aviation Regiment during the Second World War. He was posthumously declared both a Hero of the Russian Federation and a Hero of Kazakhstan after the dissolution of the Soviet Union.

== Prewar life ==
Besikbayev was born in 1920 to a Kazakh family the village of Ilinskoe in the Turkestan ASSR, in the area that is now Almaty, Kazakhstan. Upon reaching military age he was drafted into the Red Army and assigned to the Air Force, where he reached the rank of Junior Sergeant as a radio operator and gunner.

== World War II and feat ==
Soon after the German invasion of the Soviet Union, which began on 22 June 1941, Besikbayev was assigned to the 1st Squadron of the 207th Long-Range Bomber Aviation Regiment, part of the 42nd Long-Range Bomber Aviation Division of the 3rd Long-Range Bomber Aviation Corps on the Western Front, where he flew as rear gunner for pilot Aleksandr Maslov. On 26 June he was killed in action with the rest of the crew after Maslov attacked a German convoy on the Molodechno-Radoshkovichi highway in an Ilyushin Il-4 long-range bomber, possibly from a fire taran attack (the act of ramming a burning aircraft into the ground) initially attributed to Nikolai Gastello. The crew was initially declared missing in action by the Soviet Air Forces and were resultingly considered potential traitors. In 1951 the remains of the crew were identified not as those of the crew of Gastello, who had been declared a Hero of the Soviet Union after being credited with ramming a German tank column after his plane caught fire, but as those of the Maslov crew based on the findings of several military medals and an apartment key. However, the findings were not immediately made public due to Gastello's status as being credited as the first to lead a fire taran attack. In the late 1980s and 1990s many publications concluded that the first ground ramming was conducted by the Maslov crew, leading to all four crew members being posthumously awarded the Order of the Patriotic War, 1st class, in 1992 and the title Hero of the Russian Federation in 1996. In 1998 Besikbayev was declared a Hero of Kazakhstan.

== See also ==
- List of Heroes of the Russian Federation
- Nurken Abdirov
- Bauyrzhan Momyshuly
- Rakhimzhan Qoshqarbaev
