= Sagadat Nurmagambetov =

Soviet-Kazakh general

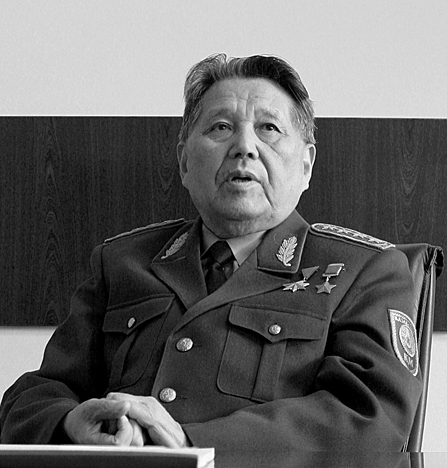
- Nurmagambetov in 2009
- Born: Sagadat Kozhahmetovich Nurmagambetov; 25 May 1924; Kosym, Kazak ASSR, Russian SFSR, Soviet Union (now in Aqmola Region, Kazakhstan)
- Died: 24 September 2013 (aged 89); Almaty, Kazakhstan
- Military career
- Allegiance: Soviet Union (1942–1991); Kazakhstan (1991–1995)
- Branch: Red Army / Soviet Army; Ground Forces of Kazakhstan
- Service years: 1942–1991; 1991–1995
- Rank: Army general (Ret.)
- Conflicts: World War II; Battle of Berlin
- Awards: Soviet Union: Hero of the Soviet Union; Order of Lenin; Order of the October Revolution; Order of the Red Banner; Order of the Patriotic War, 1st class; Order of the Patriotic War, 2nd class; Order of the Red Star (2x); Order for Service to the Homeland in the Armed Forces of the USSR, 2nd class; Order of the Red Banner of Labour; Order of the Badge of Honour; Kazakhstan: Hero of Kazakhstan; Order of Otan; Russian Federation: Order of Friendship; Ukraine: Order of Bohdan Khmelnytsky, 3rd class
- Other work: Deputy of the Supreme Soviet of the Kazakh SSR/Supreme Council of Kazakhstan (1971–1994); Chairman of the State Defense Committee of the Republic of Kazakhstan (1991–1992); Minister of Defense of the Republic of Kazakhstan (1992–1995); Adviser to the President of Kazakhstan (1995–1996)

Sagadat Kozhakhmetovich Nurmagambetov (Kazakh: Сағадат Қожахметұлы Нұрмағамбетов, Sağadat Qojahmetūly Nūrmağambetov; Russian: Сагадат Кожахметович Нурмагамбетов; 25 May 1924 – 24 September 2013) was a Soviet and Kazakh general who served as Chairman of Kazakhstan's State Defense Committee in 1991-1992 and Kazakhstan's first Minister of Defense following the dissolution of the Soviet Union in 1991, holding the office of Defense Minister from May 1992 to November 1995. He was an adviser to Nursultan Nazarbayev in 1995–1996.

Nurmagambetov began his military career as a machine gun platoon commander in the Red Army in World War II. He was promoted to machine gun company and infantry battalion commander, earning the honorary title of Hero of the Soviet Union in February 1945. His battalion went on to storm the Reich Chancellery at the Battle of Berlin in April 1945. Nurmagambetov graduated from the Frunze Military Academy after World War II and rose to become one of the highest-ranked Kazakh officers in the peacetime Soviet Army, attaining the rank of colonel general. He retired from the military of Kazakhstan as an army general in 1995. Nurmagambetov was named a Hero of Kazakhstan in 1994, becoming the first Kazakh to receive this honour.

== Biography ==
=== Early life and war service ===
Nurmagambetov was born on 25 May 1924 in the settlement of Kosym in the Kazakh Autonomous Socialist Soviet Republic of the Russian SFSR (later Kazakh Soviet Socialist Republic), now in Aqmola Region in Kazakhstan. He joined the Red Army in 1942. He received accelerated machine gun officer's training at the 1st Turkestan Machine Gun School in Kushka, Turkmen SSR (now Serhetabat in Turkmenistan) and was sent to the front lines of the Eastern Front of World War II in April 1943. He led a machine gun platoon, a machine gun company, and infantry battalion and was awarded the honorary title of Hero of the Soviet Union (medal no. 5214) and the Order of Lenin by the Presidium of the Supreme Soviet of the USSR on 27 February 1945. He fought in the Battle of Berlin and led his battalion's troops in the storming of Berlin's Reich Chancellery in April 1945.

=== Post-war ===
Nurmagambetov attended the Frunze Military Academy from June 1946 until his graduation from the academy in November 1949, continuing his military career as a senior operations section officer for the Turkestan Military District staff, a motorized rifle division's commanding officer and chief of staff, Civil Defense Forces of the Kazakh SSR chief of staff, a deputy commanding officer of the Central Asian Military District, and first deputy commander of the Soviet Union's Southern Group of Forces in Hungary. He was elected to serve as a deputy of Kazakhstan's Supreme Soviet from 1971 until 1994, and chosen to lead its committee on the disabled and military veterans' affairs in 1989.

=== Post-independence career ===
He was appointed to head Kazakhstan's State Defense Committee by Nursultan Nazarbayev in October 1991. He was named Kazakhstan's first Defence Minister following the State Defense Committee's reorganization as the Ministry of Defense of the Republic of Kazakhstan in May 1992 and remained as Defense Minister in Nazarbayev's cabinet until retiring from the armed forces as an army general in November 1995. Nazarbayev later recalled that "After gaining independence, I was looking for a general to lead the troops, and I found one - Nurmagambetov".

He was awarded Kazakhstan's highest official award, the newly established honorary title of Hero of Kazakhstan, in 1994 – the first Kazakh to attain the honor. He was an adviser to Nazarbayev from 1995 to 1996. He died on 24 September 2013.

== Family ==
He had two children. His son Talgat (1952–2020) was a major general in the reserve. He was born in Tashkent while his father served as an officer for the Turkestan Military District. His military career saw him take part in the recovery efforts after the Chernobyl disaster and the Spitak Earthquake, and from 2000 to 2001, serve as Inspector General of the Ministry of Defense.

== Legacy ==
- The Astana Zhas Ulan Republican School is named after Nurmagambetov.
- Every year on 25 May (his birthday), flowers are laid at the plaque at his house on Tulebaev-Dzhambul.
- A museum in his honor was opened in the city of Aqköl on 19 July 2007.
- On May 25, 2019, a monument to the first Minister of Defense of independent Kazakhstan, Army General Sagadat Nurmagambetov, was unveiled in Almaty.
- In September 2022, a monument to Sagadat Nurmagambetov was opened in Ust-Kamenogorsk.

== Honours and awards ==
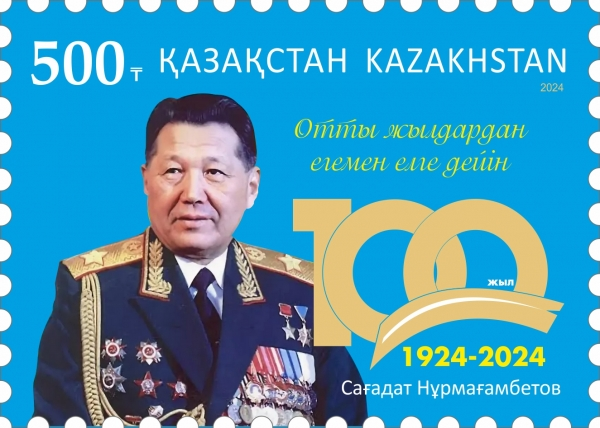
Nurmagambetov on a 2024 stamp of Kazakhstan

Union of Soviet Socialist Republics

- Hero of the Soviet Union
- Order of Lenin
- Order of the October Revolution
- Order of the Red Banner
- Order of the Patriotic War, 1st class and 2nd class
- Order of the Red Star, twice
- Order "For Service to the Homeland in the Armed Forces of the USSR", 3rd class
- Order of the Red Banner of Labour, twice
- Order of the Badge of Honour
- Medal "For Battle Merit"
- Jubilee Medal "In Commemoration of the 100th Anniversary of the Birth of Vladimir Ilyich Lenin"
- Medal "For Distinction in Guarding the State Border of the USSR"
- Medal "For the Victory over Germany in the Great Patriotic War 1941–1945"
- Jubilee Medal "Twenty Years of Victory in the Great Patriotic War 1941–1945"
- Jubilee Medal "Thirty Years of Victory in the Great Patriotic War 1941–1945"
- Jubilee Medal "Forty Years of Victory in the Great Patriotic War 1941–1945"
- Medal "For the Capture of Berlin"
- Medal "For the Liberation of Warsaw"
- Medal "Veteran of the Armed Forces of the USSR"
- Medal "For Strengthening of Brotherhood in Arms"
- Jubilee Medal "40 Years of the Armed Forces of the USSR"
- Jubilee Medal "50 Years of the Armed Forces of the USSR"
- Jubilee Medal "60 Years of the Armed Forces of the USSR"
- Medal "For Impeccable Service" 1st, 2nd and 3rd classes

Republic of Kazakhstan

- Hero of Kazakhstan
- Order of Otan
- Medal "Astana"
- Medal "10 Years of the Armed Forces of the Republic of Kazakhstan"
- Medal "10 years of independence of the Republic of Kazakhstan"
- Jubilee Medal "50 Years of Victory in the Great Patriotic War 1941–1945"
- Jubilee Medal "60 Years of Victory in the Great Patriotic War 1941–1945"

Russian Federation

- Order of Friendship
- Medal of Zhukov

Ukraine

- Order of Bohdan Khmelnytsky, 3rd class (2004)
- Honour of the President of Ukraine
- Medal "Defender of the Motherland"
- Jubilee medal "60 years of Ukraine's liberation from Nazi invaders"

Bulgaria

- Order "September 9, 1944", 1st class with swords.

Poland

- Golden Cross of Merit
- Medal Pro Memoria

Mongolia

- Medal "30 Years of Victory over Japan's militarists"

Honorary Citizen of Astana, Almaty and Donetsk.

== See also ==
- List of Kazakh Heroes of the Soviet Union
