= Gaziza Zhubanova =

Kazakh composer (1927–1993)

- Ғазиза Жұбанова
- Born: December 2, 1927; Jurun District, Aktyubinsk
- Died: December 13, 1993 (aged 66); Almaty, Kazakhstan
- Education: Attended school in Alma-Ata, Kazakhstan
- Occupations: Composer, pedagogue

Gaziza Akhmetkyzy Zhubanova (Kazakh: Ғазиза Ахметқызы Жұбанова, Ǵazıza Ahmetqyzy Jubanova; Russian: Газиза Ахметовна Жубанова with middle name "Akhmetovna"; 2 December 1927 – 13 December 1993) was a Soviet and Kazakh composer and pedagogue. She was named People's Artist of the USSR in 1981.

== Life ==
Gaziza Zhubanova was born 2 December 1927, in a village in the Jurun District, Aktyubinsk. Zhubanova attended school in Alma-Ata, Kazakhstan, and graduated with honors. She was the daughter of Akhmet Zhubanov, a university educated musician and composer who was remembered as the first Kazakh composer to embrace Western music, and grew up in a musical environment.

In 1945 Gaziza Zhubanova began studying at Gnessin State Musical College in Moscow, where she learned composition with M. Gnesin and L. Shtreiher. After completing her studies there, she studied composition with Yuri Shaporin, at the Moscow Conservatoire. After graduating in 1954, she took additional studies in composition and then in 1957 began a career as a composer.

In 1954, she participated in the Seventh Plenary Meeting of the Kazakh Union of Composers. Gaziza Zhubanova has been Chairman of the Kazakh Union of Composers, a member of the board of the USSR Union of Composers and was director of the Alma-Ata City Conservatory from 1975 to 1987. She often worked with the Kazakh Song and Dance Company.

== Selected works ==
Gaziza Zhubanova uses subjects and images from the Kazakh history and folklore. She has composed in different forms, including piano, violin, voice, chorus, string quartet and popular songs. A 'significant part' of her output is large-scale works including opera and ballet, orchestral and choral works.

- Aksak Kulan (1953–1954), symphonic poem
- Booming in the night (1916), opera
- Violin Concerto (1957)
- Melody (Мелодия) in C♯ minor for viola and piano (1950)
- Night Light in the Ural (1957), cantata (words by Khamit Ergaliev)
- Incidental music for On the Banks of the Irtysh (play by S. Kusainov)
- Ode to the Communist Party
- Glory to the Cosmonaut
- Embrace
- Ye Millions!
- Song of Virgin Lands Enthusiasts
- The Song Is the Voice of My Heart
- The Earth, the Moon and Sputnik, ballet (choreography by V. Vainonen)
- Ballade of Mukhtar Auezov, cantata
- A Legend of the White Bird, ballet
