= Shafik Chokin =

Kazakh scientist (1912–2003)

- Born: 1 October 1912
- Died: 4 July 2003; Almaty
- Citizenship: Kazakhstan
- Education: Omsk Agricultural Institute
- Awards: Order of the October Revolution, Order of the Red Banner of Labour, People's Hero of Kazakhstan, Hero of Kazakhstan
- Scientific career
- Fields: Energy sector
- Workplaces: Kazakhstan Academy of Sciences, Kazakh Scientific Research Institute of Energy

Shafik Chokin (Kazakh: Шапық Шөкіұлы Шөкин, Şapyq Şökıūly Şökin; Russian: Ша́фик Чо́кинович Чо́кин) (1 October 1912 – 4 July 2003) was a Kazakh scientist in the energy sector. He was a Doctor of Sciences, Professor, Founder of the Kazakh Scientific Research Institute of Power Engineering, Deputy of The Supreme Soviet of the USSR, associate of the chairman of Soviet of the Union chamber, and President of Kazakhstan Academy of Sciences.

== Biography ==
Shafiq Chokin was born on 1 October 1912 in Bayanaul District, in Pavlodar Province to a poor Muslim family. His father died in 1918 and his mother also died shortly after, so Shafiq was raised by his older brother Riza Muhammed Chokin. He was educated at Omsk Agricultural Institute. After graduation in 1937 he worked in the Kazakh Trust of Agricultural Electrification, where he enjoyed a successful career, being promoted to the positions of Chief Engineer and deputy director. In 1943 he was invited by Kanysh Satpayev to become the chairman of the energy sector of Kazakh Branch of the Academy of Sciences of USSR. A year later, in 1944, Chokin established the Kazakh Scientific Research Institute of Power Engineering and served as its director till 1988. During Chokin's directorship the Institute became one of the USSR's most recognized scientific research organizations in the energy sector. From 1954 to 1968 he was a member of the Presidium of Kazakhstan Academy of Sciences. In 1964, after the death of Kanysh Satpayev, Chokin was elected as the President of the academy and occupied this position till 1967. During his presidency he was also elected as a deputy of The Supreme Soviet of the USSR and appointed as an associate of the chairman of Soviet of the Union chamber. From 1966 to 1971 Chokin was a member of Central Committee of Communist Party of Kazakhstan.

On 14 June 1988 by the collective decision of Ministry of Energy and Electrification of USSR and the Presidium of Kazakhstan Academy of Sciences Chokin was appointed as an honorary director of Kazakh Scientific Research Institute of Energy. On 30 September 1992 by the decision of the Board of Ministers of the Republic of Kazakhstan, when the academician was still alive, Kazakh Scientific Research Institute of Energy was given the name of Shafik Chokin.

In 1996 President Nursultan Nazarbayev awarded Shafik Chokin the title People's Hero of Kazakhstan, the highest honor for citizens of Kazakhstan.

== Legacy ==
Kazakh Research Institute of Power Engineering named after Sh. Ch. Chokin

The following are named after Shafik Chokin:

- "Shafik Chokin" Energy Research and Design Institute, Nazarbayev University, Energy Center
- a street in Pavlodar city
- an award in the field of energy of the Presidium of Kazakhstan Academy of Sciences
- an award in the field of energy of the National Engineering Academy of the Republic of Kazakhstan

Preceded by Kanysh Satpayev	President Kazakh Academy of Sciences; 1964–1967	Succeeded by Shakhmardan Yessenov
