= Ulba Metallurgical Plant =

Joint-stock company in Kazakhstan

Ulba Metallurgical Plant JSC
- Native name: Үлбі металлургиялық зауыты АҚ; Ülbı metallurgiialyq zauyty AQ; АО Ульбинский металлургический завод
- Type: Joint Stock Company
- Industry: Nuclear & Non-Ferrous Metals industries
- Headquarters: Oskemen, Kazakhstan
- Products: Uranium, Beryllium, Tantalum & Niobium, HF acid
- Number of employees: 6000
- Parent: National Atomic Company "Kazatomprom" (90%)
- Divisions: Uranium, Beryllium & Tantalum Productions
- Subsidiaries: Mashzavod Ltd., Ulba Fluorine Complex Ltd., Yingtan Ulba Shine Metal Materials Co., Ltd., BerylliUM Ltd., Ulba China Co., Ltd.
- Website: ulba.kz

Ulba Metallurgical Plant (UMP), widely known as Ulba (Kazakh: "Үлбі металлургиялық зауыты" Акционерлік Қоғамы, "ҮМЗ" АҚ, romanized: "Ülbı metallurgiialyq zauyty" Aktsionerlık Qoğamy, "ÜMZ" AQ; Russian: АО "Ульбинский металлургический завод", АО "УМЗ"), is a joint stock company. It is part of the National Atomic Company "Kazatomprom", which is the national operator for nuclear industry in Kazakhstan. It is one of the world leaders in terms of production of beryllium, tantalum, and niobium, as well as uranium-based fuel bricks for nuclear power stations. It has been proposed as a site for storing and distributing low-enriched uranium fuel internationally to reduce proliferation risk from installing enrichment facilities in IAEA-unfriendly states.

Ulba is located in Oskemen, a large center of non-ferrous metallurgy of Kazakhstan.

TÜV-CERT certification body certifies Quality System of UMP JSC according to ISO-9001. Ulba has a number of daughter and affiliates companies for service, auxiliary operations and sales promotion. Some of them are:

- Mashzavod Ltd., machinery plant
- Ulba Fluorine Complex Ltd., production of hydrofluoric acid for different applications
- Ulba SPC Ltd., research & production company
- Yingtan Ulba Shine Metal Materials Co., Ltd., production of copper beryllium products such as strip, sheets, plates etc. It is located in Yingtan, Jiangxi Province, China. This is a joint venture between the Ulba Metallurgical Plant and Ningbo Shengtai Electronic Materials Co., Ltd.
- BerylliUM Ltd., sales promotion of Ulba products in Russia and Commonwealth of Independent States countries, located in Moscow
- Ulba China Co., Ltd., sales promotion of Ulba products in China and East Asian countries, located in Shanghai
