= Savinka, Volgograd Oblast =

Savinka Савинка
- Selo
- Location within Volgograd Oblast Location within Russia
- Coordinates: 50°04′N 47°05′E
- Country: Russia
- Region: Volgograd Oblast
- District: Pallasovsky District
- Time zone: UTC+4:00

Savinka (Russian: Савинка) is a rural locality (a selo) in Pallasovsky District, Volgograd Oblast, Russia. The population was 3,428 as of 2010. There are 33 streets.

== Geography ==
Savinka is located on the bank of the Torgun River, 18 km east of Pallasovka (the district's administrative centre) by road. Smychka is the nearest rural locality.
