= Vladimir Bogodukhov =

Russian politician

- Владимир Богодухов
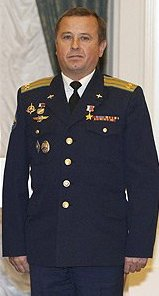
- Bogodukhov in December 2008

Member of the State Duma
- In office 9 September 2016 – 2021

Personal details
- Born: Vladimir Ivaonvovich Bogodukhov; 15 February 1961 (age 64) Grynaičiai, Lithuanian SSR, Soviet Union
- Party: United Russia

Vladimir Ivaonvovich Bogodukhov (Russian: Владимир Иванович Богодухов; born 15 February 1961), is a Russian politician and army officer who had served as a member of the State Duma of the 7th convocation from 2016 to 2021, having served as a member of the State Duma Committee on Defense, and a member of the United Russia faction.

Bogodukhov was promoted to colonel in 2017, having been awarded the title of Hero of the Russian Federation for his service in the Russo-Georgian War in 2008. He is a member of the Lipetsk Regional Political Council of the United Russia party.

== Early life ==
Bogodukhov was born on 15 February 1961 in the village of Grynaičiai, Lithuanian SSR, Soviet Union, to a family of a front-line tankman.

Over the following years, the Bogodukhov family moved with a change in their father's place of work, where they lived in Klaipėda, and since 1965, in the Michurinsky state farm in the Timiryazev District of the North Kazakhstan region of the Kazakh SSR. In January 1972, the Bogodukhovs settled in the village of Davydovka, Davydovsky Selsovet, Pritobolny District, Kurgan Oblast. From there Vladimir Bogodukhov graduated from high school.

== Military career ==
In 1978 Bogodukhov was drafted into the Soviet Army. The same year, he entered and in 1982 graduated from the Chelyabinsk Red Banner Military Aviation Institute of Navigators, after which he was sent to the Air Force of the Byelorussian Military District and served at the Bobrovichi airfield in the Gomel region, and from 1987 - in the 7th Bomber Aviation Regiment Carpathian Military District in the city of Starokostiantyniv, Khmelnytskyi Oblast, Ukrainian SSR. He held navigator positions in units of front-line bomber aviation.

From 1986 to 1987, Bogodukhov took part in the response to the Chernobyl disaster. He performed tasks of aerial photography of the accident and contamination zone in Chernobyl. Since 1989, he served in the 455th Bomber Aviation Regiment in Voronezh, and since 1993, in the 968th Aviation Regiment in Lipetsk. Since 2000 he was assigned to the 4th Centre for Combat Employment and Retraining of Personnel at Lipetsk air base. He participated in combat operations in the First and Second Chechen Wars. He mastered 10 types and modifications of aircraft. He took part in testing the latest types and systems of weapons in various conditions, including combat and those as close to combat as possible. He took part in a number of major Russian and international military exercises.

As a navigator of the 4th Centre, Lieutenant Colonel Bogodukhov took part in the Russo-Georgian War. According to his own interviews, his Sukhoi Su-24 was shot down on 11 August, but until 2017 the Russian Air Force did not confirm the downing of a Su-24 during the war, and the downing of Bogodukhov's plane was never officially confirmed.

On 14 October 2008, by decree of the President of the Russian Federation No. 1475 "for courage and heroism shown in the performance of military duty, Bogodukhov was awarded the title of Hero of the Russian Federation with the presentation of the Gold Star medal (No. 930). The same decree awarded the title of Hero of the Russian Federation to Oleg Storozhuk. Bogodukhov continued to serve in the Russian Air Force after this.

== Political career ==
On 4 December 2011, Bogodukhov was elected as a deputy of the Lipetsk Oblast Council of Deputies on the lists of the United Russia party. On 28 September 2012, he joined the United Russia party. He is a member of the Lipetsk Regional Political Council of the United Russia party.

In 2013, Bogodukhov was appointed director of the State (regional) budgetary institution "Center for Patriotic Education of the Population of the Lipetsk Region." Military pensioner. On 9 September 2016, Bogodukhov was elected to the State Duma's 7th convocation from the United Russia party. On 2 June 2017, by order of the Minister of Defence No. 310, Bogodukhov was promoted to colonel.

== Income ==
According to the declaration of income and property for 2018, Bogodukhov earned 6,989,014 rubles. He also owns 1/3 of an apartment with an area of 62.4 square meters, a Toyota Sequoia car and rents a plot of land for personal farming with an area of 1200 sq.m.

== Legislative activity ==
From 2016 to 2019, while serving as a deputy of the State Duma of the 7th convocation, Bogodukhov co-authored 19 legislative initiatives and amendments to draft federal laws.
