= Xingye Alloy Materials =

Chinese copper processing and alloy materials company

Xingye Alloy Materials Group Limited 興業合金材料集團有限公司
- Type: Public company
- Traded as: SEHK: 505
- Industry: Copper processing, Alloy materials
- Founded: 1998
- Headquarters: Cixi, Ningbo, Zhejiang, China
- Area served: Global
- Key people: Hu Changyuan (Chairman)
- Products: Copper plates and strips, tin phosphorous bronze, brass, lead frame, nickel silver
- Revenue: HK$8.53 billion (2024)
- Net income: HK$255.42 million (2024)
- Number of employees: 1,757 (2024)
- Website: xingyealloy.com

Xingye Alloy Materials Group Limited (SEHK: 505; Chinese: 兴业合金材料集团有限公司) is a publicly listed Chinese company specializing in the production and sale of high-precision copper and alloy materials. The company is headquartered in Cixi, Zhejiang Province and listed on the Hong Kong Stock Exchange.

== History ==
Xingye was founded in 1998 as a copper product manufacturer. It was listed on the Hong Kong Stock Exchange in 2007 under the name Xingye Copper International Group Limited.

In 2016, the company acquired Funnytime Limited, an internet and mobile gaming products developer.

In June 2020, the company returned its focus to alloy materials and officially changed its name to Xingye Alloy Materials Group Limited.

== Operations ==
Xingye produces a variety of non-ferrous alloy products, including:

- High-precision copper plates and strips
- Tin phosphorous bronze strips
- Brass strips
- Lead frame materials
- Nickel silver alloys

Its products are primarily sold under the Three Rings (Chinese: 三环牌) brand.

The company's manufacturing facility in Cixi, Zhejiang supports large-scale production for domestic and international markets in electronics, automotive, home appliances, and precision equipment sectors.

The majority of revenue is derived from mainland China, with additional customers in Hong Kong, Taiwan, India, South Korea, and Southeast Asia.
