= Marat Khusainov =

Kazakh military general

- Марат Құсайынов; Marat Qūsaiynov
- Born: May 20, 1967 (age 59); Karaganda, Kazakh SSR, Soviet Union
- Alma mater: Military Academy of the General Staff of the Armed Forces of Russia
- Children: 2
- Military career
- Allegiance: Kazakhstan
- Branch: Kazakh Ground Forces
- Rank: Lieutenant general
- Commands: Chief of the General Staff; Commander-in-Chief of the Ground Forces

Marat Rahymuly Khusainov (Kazakh: Марат Рахымұлы Құсайынов; born May 20, 1967) is a Kazakh military general and the current first deputy minister of defence of Kazakhstan and chief of general staff in the Kazakh Armed Forces. Prior to his appointment to the ministry of defence in September 2021, he served as commander-in-chief of the Land Forces.

== Biography ==
Khusainov was born in Karaganda, Kazakh Soviet Socialist Republic. He graduated from the 2nd platoon of the 9th company and Chelyabinsk Higher Tank Command School in 1988. He obtained his professional military education from the Malinovsky Military Armored Forces Academy in Moscow in 1997. He was awarded a golden medal by the Military Academy of the General Staff of the Armed Forces of Russia in 2010.

=== Career ===
As a military officer, he served at multiple positions and commanded various units and armored fighting vehicles, including platoon. During his assignments, he served as commander of the Kazakh Ground Forces' Regional Command. He established a marine brigade in 2001–2002. In 2002, he was deployed at Aktau and served there until April 2005.

When he obtained his graduation from the Military Academy of the General Staff of the Russian Federation, he was assigned his duties as a deputy commander of the Regional Command and later chief of staff of Eastern command from 2010 to 2013, Western command from 2013 to 2014, and Southern command from 2014 to 2016. After he completed his assignment at Southern command, he was promoted to the rank of lieutenant general.

== See also ==
- Chief of the General Staff (Kazakhstan)
