= Order of Glory (Kazakhstan) =

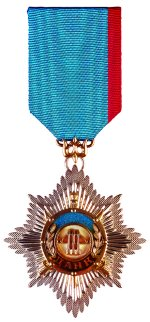
- Order of Glory of Kazakhstan
- Type: Order
- Awarded for: Persons of the highest officers
- Presented by: Kazakhstan
- Eligibility: Kazakh and foreign citizens
- Status: active
- Established: April 1, 1993
- Ribbon of the order

Precedence
- Next (higher): Order of the Leopard
- Next (lower): Order of Valor

The Order of Glory (Kazakh: Даңқ ордені, romanized: Dañq ordenı, trans. Order of Dank) is an order of the Republic of Kazakhstan introduced in 1993.

Order of Dank is conferred upon top-ranking officers of the armed forces, other military formations and units, as well as management staff of the prosecution, national security, and internal affairs of the Republic of Kazakhstan and other countries:

- for achievements in leadership and command and control, high combat readiness of the troops and maintaining the country's defense capabilities;
- or for excellent organization of military, frontier and interior service, guaranteeing national security, enforcement of law and public order.

== History ==
Single-class Order of Dank was established with Law No. 2069-XII On State Awards of the Republic of Kazakhstan dd. April 1, 1993. It was reserved for law enforcement officers. Law No. 462-1 (dd. July 26, 1999) divided Dank into 2 classes and gave it a new design. After that change, the order was designated for the top-ranking officers and generals of Kazakhstan's armed forces, National Security Committee, General Prosecutor's Office and Ministry of the Interior.

== Classes ==
Order of Dank has two classes:

- Dank Order, Class I — consisting of a star and insignia on the shoulder ribbon.
- Dank Order, Class II — consisting of a star-shaped decoration on a ribbon.

Class I, as the highest honor, is only conferred upon holders of Class II.

== Description ==
=== Initial design (1993–1999) ===
The decoration consists of a silver five-pointed mullet composed of dual-edged rays superimposed with 3 gold-plated spears (one positioned vertically, two others in a sidelong cross) and 2 crossed golden sabres. A round golden shield resting on top of them contains concentric white and blue circles. The bottom part of the blue ring carries a red ribbon with ДАҢҚ written on it and gold laurel branches pointing outside. The white circle is adorned with a gold bow superimposed with three arrows.

=== Current design (since 1999) ===
Class I decoration is a silver rippled eight-point star with a similar smaller mullet (this one with faceted rays) superimposed on it. A round gold shield with nested white and blue circles rests on top of two crossed sabres and a spear in the center of the mullet. The bottom part of the blue ring carries a red ribbon with ДАҢҚ written on it and gold laurel wreaths pointing outside. The white circle is adorned with a gold bow superimposed with three arrows.

Class I star is made of silver, its eight points terminate in rubies. A nested smaller star of blue enamel carries the central medallion of the order decoration.

The order is worn on a 100mm-wide shoulder cordon.

Class II order is similar to Class I decoration, though smaller. A suspension connects the star to a ribboned metal top bar.

The tincture of the cordon matches that of the national flag of Kazakhstan, the right rim is adorned with a wide red stripe.

== Order coin ==
Commemorative 50 tenge coins portraying Dank order and made of copper and nickel alloy were minted by the National Bank of the Republic of Kazakhstan in October 2008.

== Incomplete list of Dank honorees ==
Order of Dank 1st Class:

1. Talgat Bigeldinov — twice Hero of the Soviet Union, WW2 veteran;
2. Kairbek Suleimenov — former Minister of the Interior of the Republic of Kazakhstan;
3. Kalmukhanbet Kassymov — former Minister of the Interior of the Republic of Kazakhstan (2014);
4. Kairat Kozhamzharov — Chairman of Kazakhstan's Agency for Civil Service and Prevention of Corruption;
5. Erlan Turgymbaev — Minister of the Interior of the Republic of Kazakhstan.

Order of Dank 2nd Class:

1. Serimzhan Dosumov — Head of Astana Department of Internal Affairs (2005);
2. Amangeldy Shabdarbayev — Chairman of Kazakhstan's National Security Committee;
3. Kopen Akhmadiev — Air Defence Commander-in-Chief, Republic of Kazakhstan's Armed Forces (2006);
4. Baurzhan Yelubaev — Dean of the Military Academy under the aegis of National Security Committee of the Republic of Kazakhstan (2006);
5. Bulat Sembinov — Lieutenant General, Deputy Minister of Defense of the Republic of Kazakhstan;
6. Maksut Nurimanov — Major General, Deputy Chairman of Kazakhstan's National Security Committee;
7. Bulat Janasaev — Lieutenant General, Deputy Minister of Defense of the Republic of Kazakhstan;
8. Bulat Iskakov — Kazakhstan's Ambassador Extraordinary and Plenipotentiary to the Republic of Belarus;
9. Kalmukhanbet Kassymov — Minister of the Interior of the Republic of Kazakhstan (2005);
10. Abdrashid Zhukenov — Deputy Chairman of the Republic of Kazakhstan's Agency for Fighting Economic and Corruption Crimes (Financial Police) (2005);
11. Seribay Yerimbetov — Head of South Kazakhstan Regional Department for Fighting Economic and Corruption Crimes (2013);
12. Yerlik Kenenbaev — Deputy Minister of the Interior (2013);
13. Dastan Sartaev — Prosecutor of the Pavlodar Region (2013);
14. Seitzhan Shalabaev — Head of Analysis and Strategic Planning Department at the National Security Committee (2013);
15. Serik Aubakirov — Chairman of the Firefighting Committee in the Ministry of Emergency Management of the Republic of Kazakhstan (2013);
16. Muslim Altynbaev — Deputy Minister of Defense (2018);
17. Erlan Turgymbaev — Minister of Defense of the Republic of Kazakhstan.

== Gallery ==
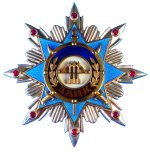
Star of the Order of the 1st Class

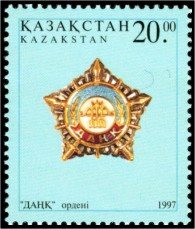
The badge of the Order of the first type on the postage stamp of Kazakhstan in 1997

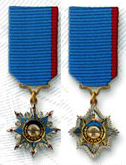
Miniatures of the Order to the 1st and 2nd Classes

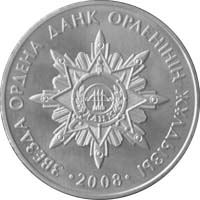
A coin with a face value of 50 tenge

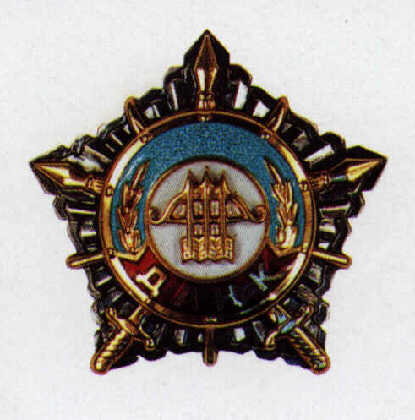
Badge of the Order of the first type (until 1998)

== See also ==
- Orders, decorations, and medals of Kazakhstan
