= Sultan Kamaletdinov =

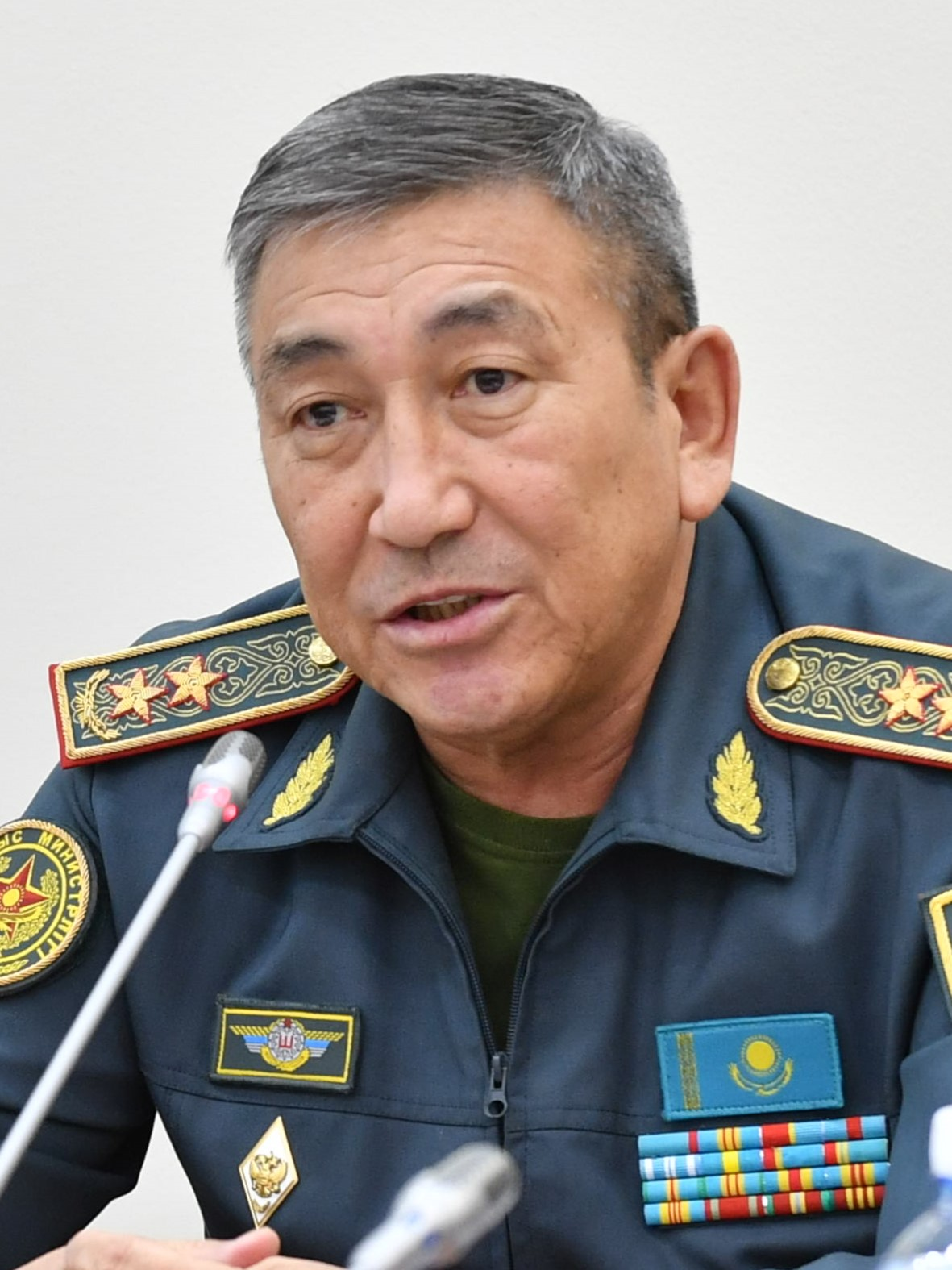
- Born: February 12, 1965 (age 61); Zelenga, Astrakhan Oblast, Russian SFSR, Soviet Union
- Military career
- Allegiance: Soviet Union; Kazakhstan
- Branch: Soviet Army; Kazakh Ground Forces
- Service years: 1982–present
- Rank: Lieutenant general

Sultan Burkutbayevich Kamaletdinov (Kazakh: Сұлтан Бүркітбайұлы Қамалетдинов, Russian: Султан Буркутбаевич Камалетдинов, romanized: Sultan Burkutbayevich Kamaletdinov; born 12 February 1965) is a Kazakh lieutenant general who served as the Chief of the General Staff of the Armed Forces of Kazakhstan and First Deputy Minister of Defense from January 2024 to January 2026.

== Early life and education ==
Kamaletdinov was born on 12 February 1965 in the village of Zelenga, Volodarsky District, Astrakhan Oblast, Russian SFSR. He entered military service in August 1982 and attended the Tashkent Higher Tank Command School, graduating in 1986. Following his commissioning in 1986, Kamaletdinov served as a tank platoon commander in a guards tank regiment stationed with the Group of Soviet Forces in Germany until 1989.

In the post-Soviet period, he transitioned to the Armed Forces of the Republic of Kazakhstan, holding various command and staff positions within mechanized and tank formations. He graduated from the Malinovsky Military Academy of Armored Forces in 1997. From 2006 to 2008, he was Deputy Chief of Staff for Regional Command "East" and later served as Deputy Commander for Combat Training for Regional Command "South".

== Command positions ==
He graduated from the Military Academy of the General Staff of the Armed Forces of the Russian Federation in 2010, after he was appointed Chief of Staff of Regional Command "South" and subsequently serving as Chief of Staff of Regional Command "Astana". In 2013, he was promoted to commander of the regional command. On 15 November 2016, he became First Deputy Commander-in-Chief and Chief of the Main Staff of the Kazakh Ground Forces to Murat Bektanov. From 2019 to 2021, he served as Head of the National Defense University in Astana, succeeding former Defence Minister Saken Zhasuzakov. From 2021 to 2024, he was Deputy Minister of Defense for Educational and Ideological Work.

On 15 January 2024, President Kassym-Jomart Tokayev appointed Kamaletdinov as Chief of the General Staff, succeeding Major General Marat Khusainov. On 17 January 2026, he was relieved of his duties and was succeeded by Major General Kanysh Abubakirov.

== Awards and decorations ==
- Order of Dank, 2nd Class (2017)

== See also ==
- Chief of the General Staff (Kazakhstan)
