= 221st Division =

221st Division may refer to:

- 221st Security Division, Wehrmacht, Germany
- 221st Coastal Division, Italy
- 221st Division (Imperial Japanese Army)
- 221st Rifle Division, Soviet Union

== See also ==
- List of military divisions by number
- 221st Brigade (disambiguation)
