= Uali Elamanov =

Kazakhstani general (1952–2023)

Major General Uali Bisakanovich Elamanov
- Уәли Бисақанұлы Еламанов
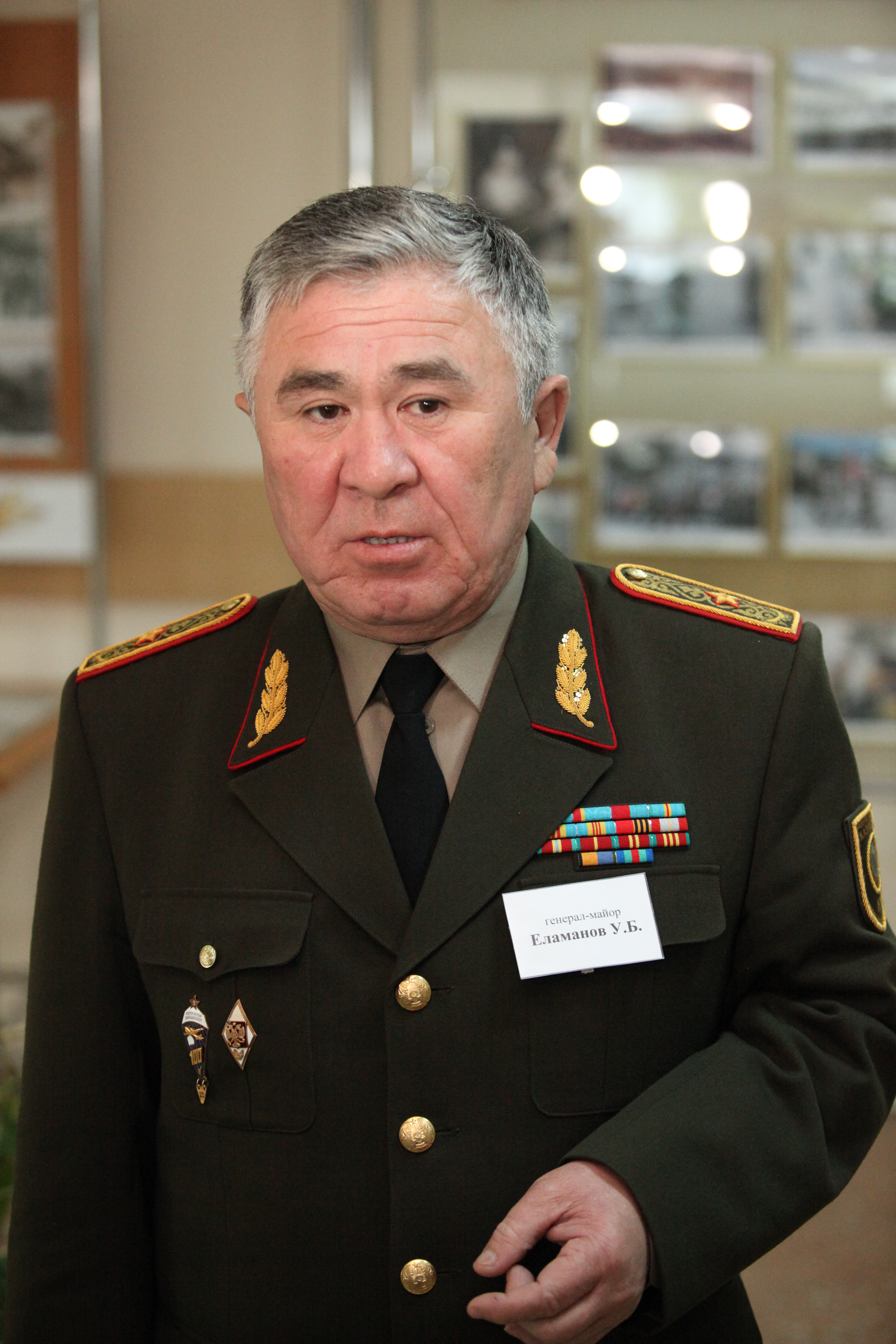
- Elamanov in May 2010
- Born: June 15, 1952; Akzhaik District, West Kazakhstan Region, Kazakh SSR
- Died: May 27, 2023 (aged 70)
- Education: Ryazan Higher Airborne Command School (1974), Frunze Military Academy (1985), Military Academy of the General Staff of the Armed Forces of the Russian Federation (2001)
- Military career
- Allegiance: Soviet Union (until 1991); Kazakhstan (1992–2011)
- Branch: Soviet Airborne Forces; Kazakh Ground Forces
- Service years: 1974–2011
- Rank: Major General
- Units: 105th Guards Airborne Division; 35th Guards Air Assault Brigade; 1318th Separate Airborne Assault Regiment
- Commands: Kazakh Mobile/Air Assault Forces (2001–2003), 1st Army Corps (1997–1999), 2nd Army Corps (1999), Southern Military District (2003–2004)

Major General Uali Bisakanovich Elamanov (Kazakh: Уәли Бисақанұлы Еламанов, Uäli Bisaqanūly Elamanov; 15 June 1952 – 27 May 2023) was a Kazakh general. He was the first commander of the Kazakh Air Assault Forces of the Kazakh Ground Forces.

== Early life and career ==
Uali Elamanov was born on 15 June 1952 in the Akzhaik District of the West Kazakhstan Region in the Kazakh SSR. In 1970, he graduated from high school in the village of Dzhambeyty in the Syrym District. In 1974, he graduated from the Ryazan Higher Airborne Command School. He began his officer service as the commander of an airborne platoon of the 105th Guards Airborne Division in the city of Osh in Kyrgyzstan. Subsequently, he served in the Group of Soviet Forces in Germany in the 35th Guards Air Assault Brigade as commander of an airborne battalion. He graduated from the Frunze Military Academy in 1985. In 1985, he was appointed deputy commander of the 1318th Separate Airborne Assault Regiment in the Belarusian Military District. From the period from 1987 to 1988 he was a military adviser at the training center for the training of airborne forces in the Republic of Mozambique.

== Career in Kazakhstan ==
In 1992, the year Kazakhstan gained independence, he came to the disposal of the State Committee of the Republic of Kazakhstan. From 1992 to 1996, he held the posts of deputy commander and commander of the 35th air assault brigade in the Almaty Region. From November 1997 to April 1999 he held the post of commander of the 1st Army Corps in Semipalatinsk and from April 1999 to December 1999 he held the post of commander of the 2nd Army Corps in Almaty. In 2001, he graduated with honors from the Military Academy of the General Staff of the Armed Forces of the Russian Federation.

In October 2001, he was appointed commander of the Kazakh Mobile Forces (later renamed Air Assault Forces). From 2003 to 2004, he was Commander of the Forces of the Southern Military District (later regional command "South"). He retired in May 2004 before being called up again for military service in 2007. In 2009, he became First Deputy Chairman of the Joint Staff Committee. In September 2010, he became Head of the Personnel Department of the Ministry of Defense. He retired on 14 December 2011 and has since then been Head of the Military Department of the L. N. Gumilyov Eurasian National University.

== Death ==
Elamanov died on 27 May 2023, at the age of 70.
