= Kanysh Abubakirov =

Kazakh military officer

Lieutenant General Kanysh Abubakirov
- Қаныш Әбубәкіров
- Born: 12 February 1977 (age 49); Tortkul, Ordabasy District, South Kazakhstan Region, Kazakh SSR, Soviet Union
- Military career
- Allegiance: Kazakhstan
- Branch: Kazakh Ground Forces; Kazakh Airmobile Forces
- Service years: 1998–present
- Rank: Lieutenant general

Kanysh Asankhanuly Abubakirov (Kazakh: Қаныш Асанханұлы Әбубәкіров; Russian: Каныш Асанханович Абубакиров: born 12 February 1977) is a Kazakh general serving as the Chief of the General Staff of the Armed Forces of the Republic of Kazakhstan from 17 January 2026 to 3 October 2026.

== Biography ==
He was born in the Ordabasy District of South Kazakhstan on 12 February 1977. He graduated from the Military Academy of the Armed Forces of the Republic of Kazakhstan in 1998. He later graduated from the National Defense University with honours and a gold medal in 2005 and 2015, having majored in military and public administration. Upon commissioning, he became commander of the reconnaissance group of an airborne assault battalion from April 1998 to June 1999. He then served as commander of a heavy machine gun company until May 2001. He then spent five years as deputy commander of an airborne assault battalion and then three more years as deputy commander of military unit 61993. He then served between February 2009 and August 2015 as commander of various units within the Kazakh Airmobile Forces, before becoming Deputy Commander of the Airmobile Forces and Head of the Combat Training Department of the Directorate of the Commander of the Airmobile Forces, serving until 2016.

In June 2016, he became Chief of Staff and First Deputy Commander of the Airborne Assault Troops, and then, in late 2017, Commander of Regional Command 'West'. On 5 May 2019, he was made Commander of the Kazakh Air Assault Forces. He was promoted to First Deputy Commander-in-Chief of the Ground Forces in June 2021. On 4 January 2024, he was made Deputy Minister of Defense for Logistics and Military Infrastructure. He was made a Lieutenant general on 6 May 2024. On 17 January 2026, President Kassym-Jomart Tokayev appointed Abubakirov as First Deputy Minister of Defense and Chief of the General Staff, succeeding Sultan Kamaletdinov.

== Awards ==
- Order of Valor, 2nd class
- Order of Glory, 2nd class (22 October 2022)
- Medal "For Combat Valor"

== See also ==
- Chief of the General Staff (Kazakhstan)
