= Honor Guard Company (Kazakhstan) =

Ceremonial unit in Kazakhstan

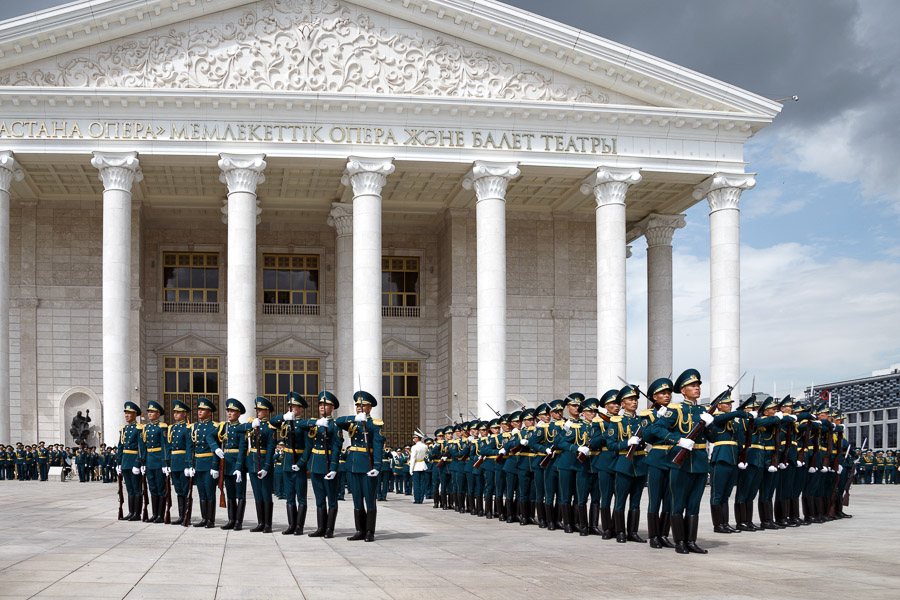
A drill team from the company performing an exhibition drill at the Shanghai Cooperation Organization Military Tattoo, 2016.

The Honor Guard Company of the Ministry of Defense of Kazakhstan (Kazakh: Қазақстан Республикасы Қорғаныс министрлігінің Құрметті күзетші, Qazaqstan Respýblıkasy Qorǵanys mınıstrliginiń Qurmetti küzetşi; Russian: Роты почетного караула Министерства обороны Республики Казахстан) is a guard of honour unit of Kazakhstan that serves as part of the country's Ministry of Defense. It is officially part of the 36th Air Assault Brigade of the Kazakh Air Assault Forces and is composed of soldiers from the Ground Forces, Air Defense Forces, Navy. It is currently led by Captain Maksat Bayzhigitov.

It was founded in 2002, by order of then defense minister Mukhtar Altynbayev. Since its formation, the company has taken part in all ceremonies and events in Kazakhstan and also abroad. Among the events the company has taken part in is the Inauguration of the President of Kazakhstan, Victory Day, Independence Day and Defender of the Fatherland Day parades.

== Foreign activities ==
The company is the primary Kazakh military participant in foreign parades. One of its first activities was the 2010 Moscow Victory Day Parade on Red Square, during which it was led by Kaidar Karakulov. One of its biggest foreign parades was the 2015 China Victory Day Parade. In 2019, it took part in the Minsk Independence Day Parade on Victors Avenue in honor of the diamond jubilee of the 1944 Minsk Offensive.

== Photos ==
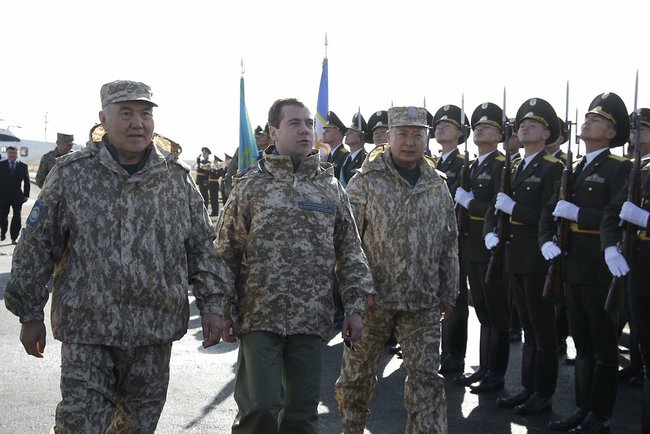
Dmitry Medvedev, Nursultan Nazarbayev, and Kurmanbek Bakiyev inspecting the company in 2009.

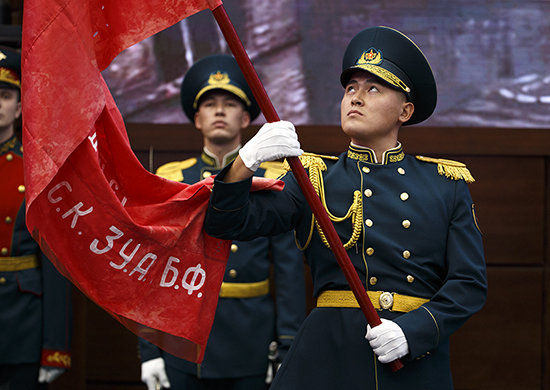
An honour guard holding the Banner of Victory.

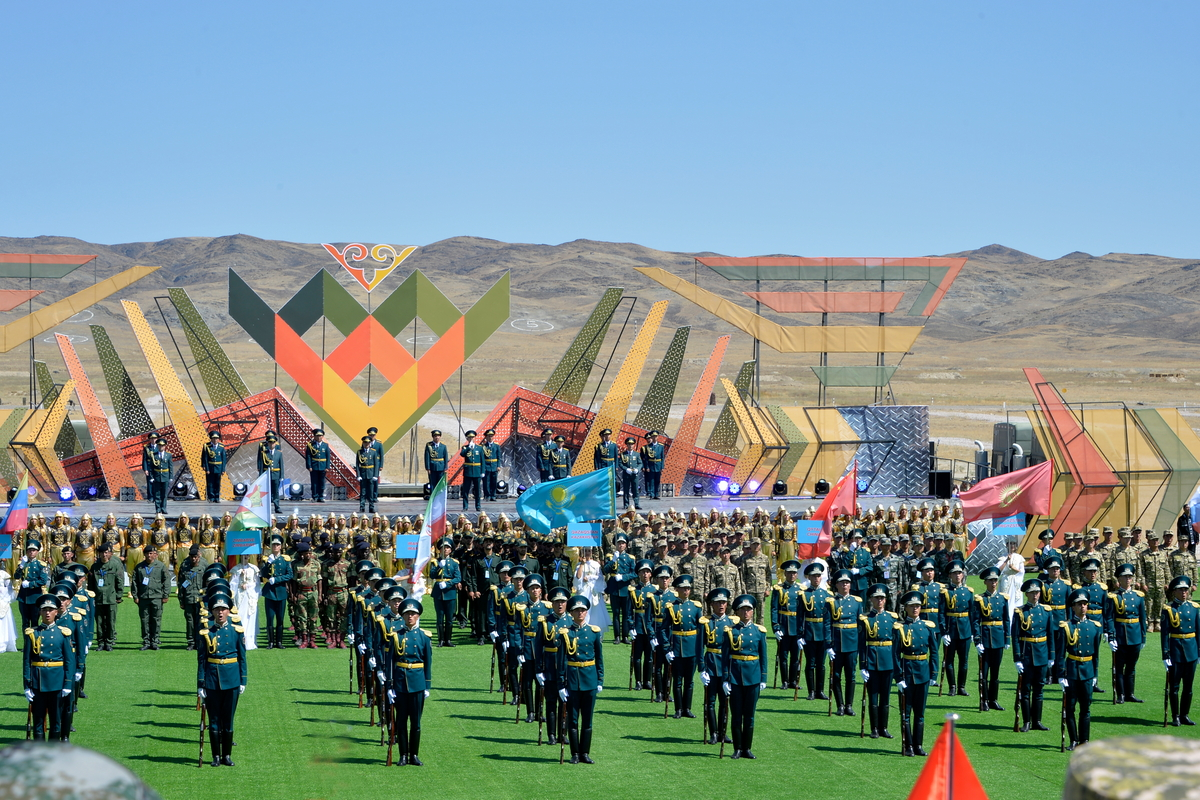
The guard at the 2019 International Army Games

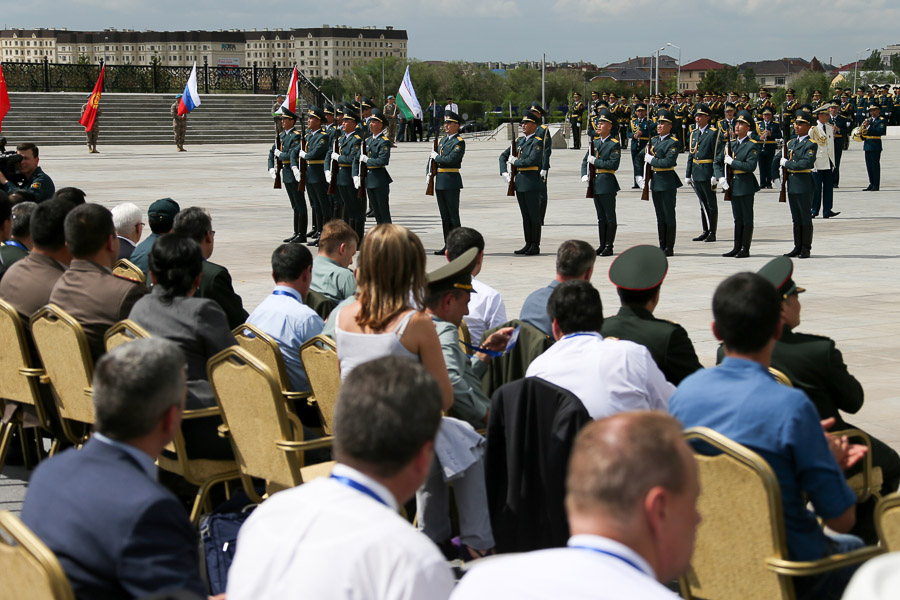
At the 2016 Shanghai Cooperation Organization Military Tattoo in Astana.

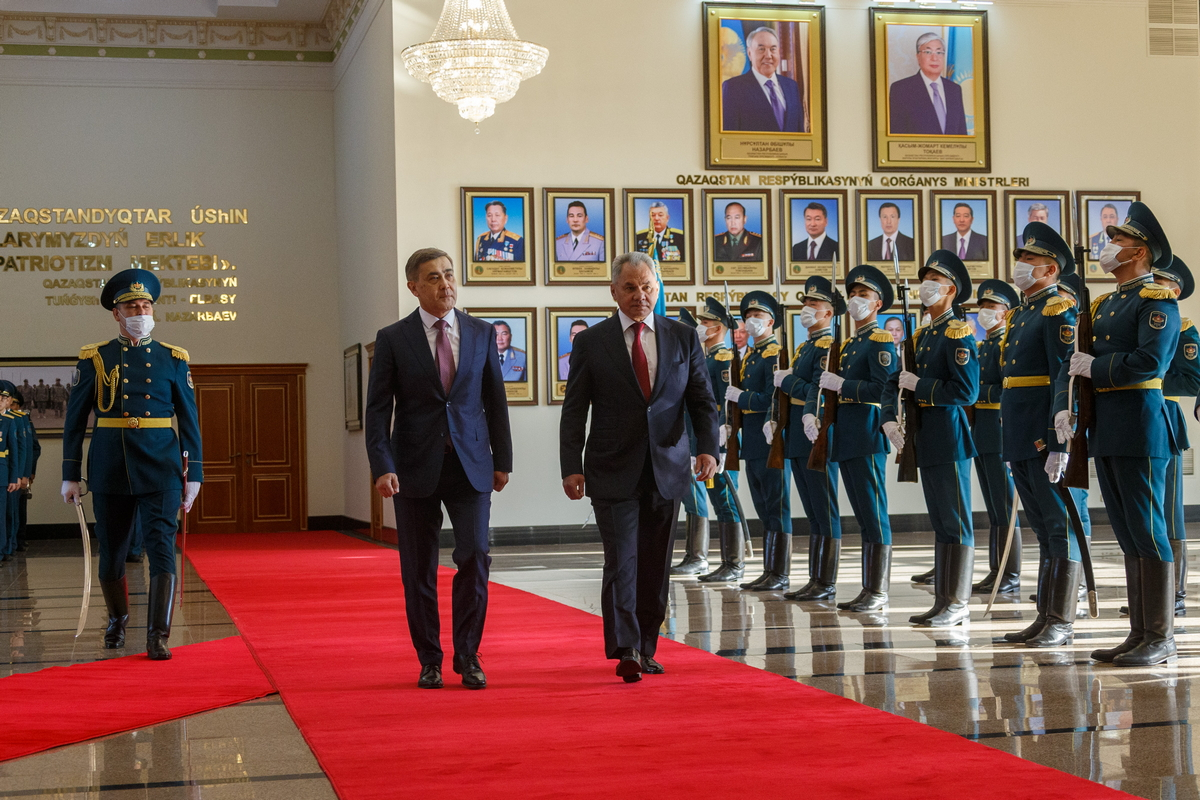
Sergey Shoigu and Nurlan Yermekbayev inspecting the company.

== See also ==
- Aibyn Regiment
