= 390th Guards Naval Infantry Brigade =

- 390-шы жеке гвардиялық теңіз жаяу әскерлері бригадасы 390-я отдельная гвардейская бригада морской пехоты
- Active: 1941–present
- Country: USSR; Kazakhstan
- Branch: Soviet Army; Kazakh Ground Forces
- Type: Naval infantry
- Size: Brigade
- Part of: Regional Command "West"
- Garrison/HQ: Aktau
- Equipment: BTR-82, T-72
- Engagements: Battle of Stalingrad; Soviet invasion of Manchuria
- Decorations: Order of Alexander Nevsky; Order of Kutuzov in the 3rd degree
- Battle honours: Vienna

Commanders
- Notable commanders: Lieutenant Colonel Mereke Kuchikbaev

The 390th Independent Guards Naval Infantry Brigade (Kazakh: 390-шы жеке гвардиялық теңіз жаяу әскерлері бригадасы, romanized: 390-şy jeke gvardiialyq teñız jaiau äskerlerı brigadasy; Russian: 390-я отдельная гвардейская бригада морской пехоты), also known as the Military Unit 25744, is a naval infantry brigade of the Kazakh Ground Forces. The brigade is the only naval infantry formation in the Armed Forces of the Republic of Kazakhstan.

== History ==
The brigade was formed in 1941 as the 892nd Infantry Regiment of the Red Army's 298th Rifle Division. When reforming the 80th Guards Training Motor Rifle Division, the brigade unit was created, being located offsite from the Otar Military Base. The brigade was formed on the basis of the 55th Guards Motorized Rifle Regiment, which relocated from the village of Gvardeisky in Guryev, from which all regalia and honorary titles were located. It was originally formed on 12 June 2002 in Atyrau as the 2nd Independent Guards Motorized Rifle Brigade of the Western Regional Command. In August 2004, the brigade was reorganized into the 390th Independent Guard Brigade of the Coastal Defense. On 9 January 2006, Deputy Defense Minister Lieutenant General Nikolai Pospelov unveiled a marine facility in the Karakiya district about 20 kilometers from the Port of Aktau, which provided new living quarters for Kazakh marines, having already cost an around 4 billion tenges ($30 million USD). In 2009, the brigade was relocated to Aktau.

On 17 March 2011, by decree of the President of Kazakhstan Nursultan Nazarbayev, the brigade was given its current name. A short while later, members of the brigade were sent to the United States to train at Marine Corps Recruit Depot Parris Island with servicemen of the United States Marine Corps. With all the reorganizations, the military unit number had always remained the same. During a military parade on Constitution Day in Astana's Independence Square, Kazakh marines marched for the first time. During the Zhanaozen massacre, there were reports of 1,500 marines being sent to Zhanaozen to "restore order". In July 2015, the brigade opened the contest "Caspian Sea-2015".

== Composition ==
The brigade has the following composition:

- 1st Marine Corps Battalion
- 2nd Marine Corps Battalion
- 3rd Marine Corps Battalion
- 1st Tank Battalion
- 2nd Tank Battalion
- Artillery Division
- Anti-Aircraft Missile and Artillery Division
- Combat and Rear Support Units

== Honours ==
The title of "Guards" was awarded in 1943 for its service during the Siege of Stalingrad. Later, the regiment was awarded the honorary title of Vienna, as well as the Order of Alexander Nevsky and the Order of Kutuzov in the 3rd degree.

== See also ==
- 336th Guards Naval Infantry Brigade
- 2nd Guards Motor Rifle Brigade
- Ukrainian Naval Infantry
