= 221st Brigade =

221st Brigade may refer to:

- 221st Separate Communications Brigade, Kazakhstan/Soviet Union
- 221st Mixed Brigade (Spain)
- 221st Independent Infantry Brigade (Home), United Kingdom
- 221st Mixed Brigade (United Kingdom)
- 221st Brigade, Royal Field Artillery, United Kingdom
