= KAZBAT =

- КАЗБАТ
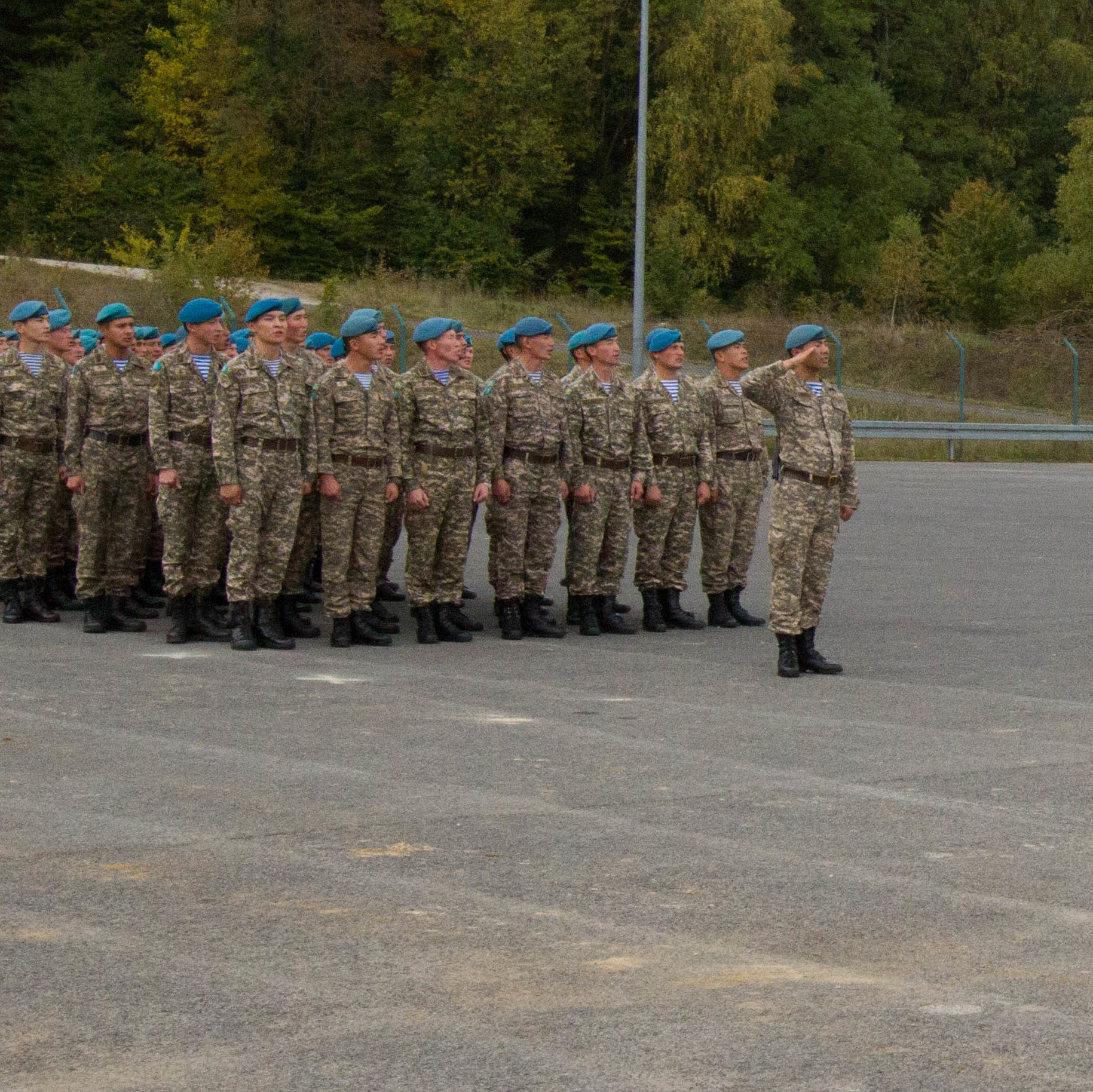
- KAZBAT soldiers at the closing ceremony of Steppe Eagle in 2014.
- Active: 31 January 2000 – Present
- Allegiance: Kazakhstan; United Nations
- Branch: Kazakh Air Assault Forces
- Role: Peacekeeping
- Size: Independent Battalion (over 300)
- Part of: 38th Air Assault Brigade (KAZBRIG)
- Garrison/HQ: Kapchagay, Almaty Region

KAZBAT refers to a peacekeeping military unit in the Armed Forces of Kazakhstan. It is an airmobile brigade of the Kazakh Air Assault Forces.

== History ==
In 1995, the governments of Kazakhstan, Kyrgyzstan, and Uzbekistan established the Central Asian Battalion (CENTRASBAT). It was dissolved in 1999, even though the last manoeuvre took place as initially planned in 2000. Afterwards, KAZBAT was established on 31 January 2000 by decree of President Nursultan Nazarbayev and is responsible for conducting peacekeeping operations and humanitarian missions in foreign countries on behalf of the Republic of Kazakhstan. In 2015, the Law "On Peacekeeping of the Republic of Kazakhstan" was adopted by the Parliament of Kazakhstan, defining the tasks and competencies of the state in regulating the participation of the country's peacekeeping operations around the world.

== Deployments ==
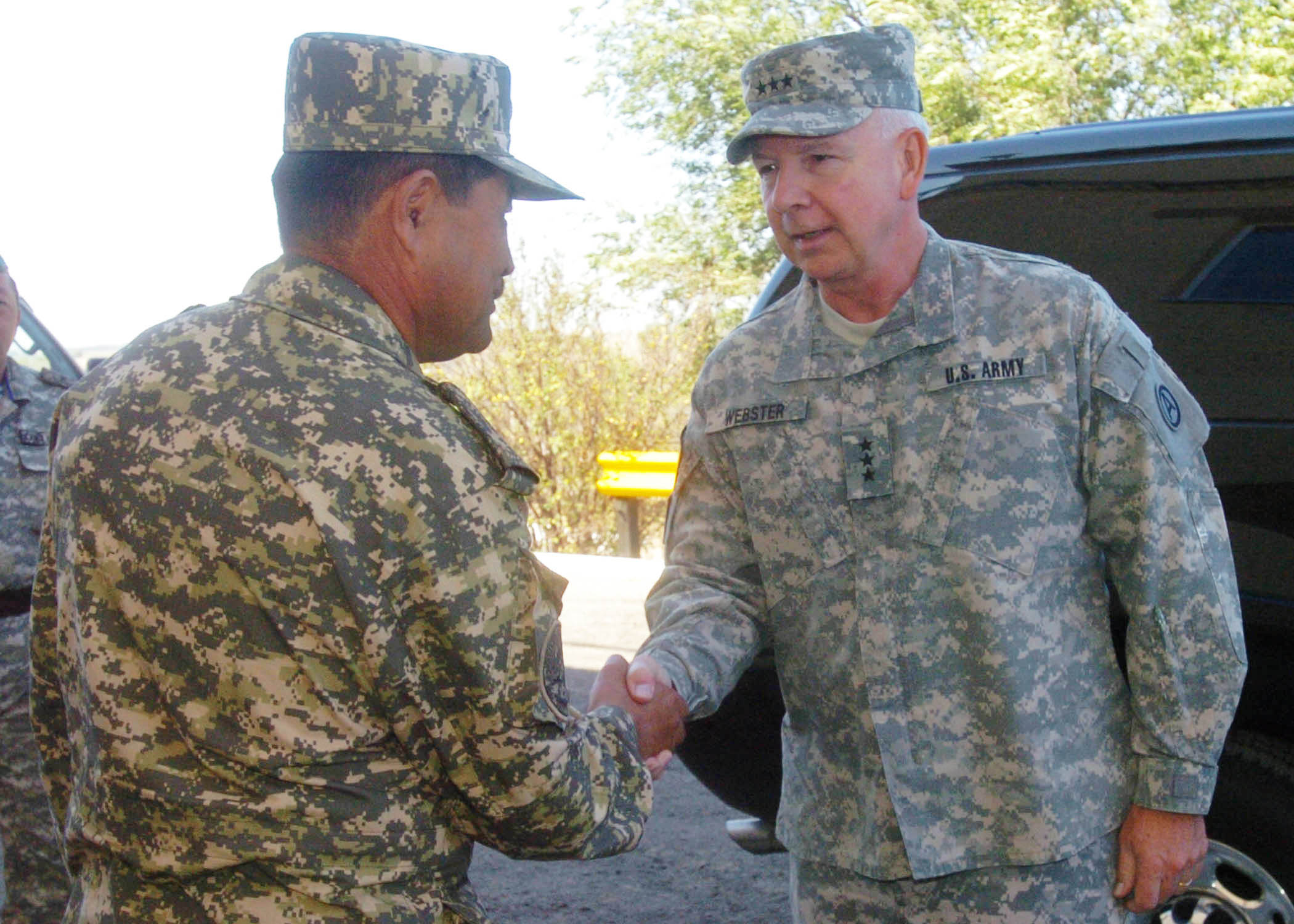
Major General Adilbek Aldaberpenov (left) greets Lieutenant General William Glenn Webster of United States Army Central at KAZBAT headquarters, 1 October 2009.

In 2003, Nazarbayev sent close to 300 KAZBAT peacekeepers to Iraq during the early stages of the Iraq War, where its personnel took part in Demining operations. During this 5 year action as part of a NATO-led Multi-National Force – Iraq, an explosion occurred when Kazakh sappers accompanied by a Ukrainian back-up team set off two rigged aerial bombs while attempting to unload them from the transport vehicles. Compared to the 8 deaths from the Ukrainian 72nd Mechanized Brigade, the battalion suffered a sole fatality. Ukrainian President Kuchma ordered the immediate withdrawal of Ukrainian peacekeepers as a result, but the Kazakh unit remained until 2008.

Soldiers of the battalion have also been sent on peacekeeping missions led by the United Nations, including those in Lebanon (as part of the United Nations Interim Force in Lebanon), Haiti, Western Sahara, Cote d’Ivoire and Liberia. In the Lebanese contingent, a company of 120 personnel were part of the IndKazBat unit. The Ministry of Defence described the mission as one that "will help strengthen international security and demonstrates Kazakhstan’s position as a responsible member of the international community".

== Training exercises ==
It has also participated in many joint exercises with other peacekeeping units and military units, such as the Arizona Army National Guard. Since 2002, the unit has hosted the joint tactical peacekeeping exercise "Steppe Eagle" in Kazakhstan, during which it operates within a multinational force under a unified NATO-led command. The battalion annually sends at least a dozen soldiers to the United Kingdom to attend the British Armed Forces Training Establishment for Peace Support Operations in the region.

== Requirements ==
All members of the battalion are fluent in English, as well as other languages, including Russian and French. Other criteria include at least 5 years of service in the military, excellent physical shape, and health and an age range of between 25 and 50 years old.

== In popular culture ==
In 2019, a film directed by Askar Uzabaev was released called The KAZBAT Soldiers, which depicted a border skirmish during a peacekeeping operation in Tajikistan during their civil war when 17 members of the battalion's predecessor unit were killed in fighting with Islamic rebels. The film was primarily aired on the Qazaqstan state media channel.

== See also ==
- Azerbaijani peacekeeping forces
- 15th Separate Motor Rifle Brigade
- 22nd Peacekeeping Battalion (Moldova)
- Polish–Ukrainian Peace Force Battalion
