= Al-Suwaira fuel dump explosion =

Terrorist incident in Iraq

Al-Suwaira attack
- Part of the Iraq War
Date	January 9, 2005
Location	Al-Suwaira, Wasit Governorate, Iraq
Result	Attack successful

Belligerents
Multinational Division Central-South: Poland; Ukraine; Kazakhstan	Islamic Army of Iraq

Units involved
(Ukraine) 72nd Mechanized Battalion (Kazakhstan) KAZBAT Battalion	?

Casualties and losses
(Ukraine) 8 killed, 6 wounded (Kazakhstan) 1 killed, 4 wounded	?

On January 9, 2005, a 27-man team of Kazakh sappers from the Kazbat engineer battalion collected 35 aerial bombs that Iraqi police had found stashed near the central military base of Al-Suwaira, located 6 miles south of Baghdad. The bombs were loaded onto transport trucks from where they would be defused at the Al-Suwaira Multinational Division Central-South army base.

== Events ==
At 12:05 a.m, the trucks reached the base and a Ukrainian back-up team from the 72nd mechanized battalion assisted the sappers in unloading the explosives from the transport vehicles. While this was happening an explosive rigged between two of the aerial bombs detonated itself, caused a mass explosion that killed 8 Ukrainian troops and a Kazakh sapper, while also wounding 10 others of varying degrees, including 6 Ukrainians and 4 Kazakhs. Among the dead was a 72nd Battalion lieutenant colonel.

Following the incident, the Islamic Army in Iraq claimed responsibility for the explosion. According to the Ukrainian contingent commander in Iraq, Major General Serhii Popko, there were reports of men sitting in a car and surveying the troops unload the charges before the blast, and then quickly speeding away afterwards. This caused speculation as to whether the IED was triggered remotely.

In reaction to the deaths, Ukrainian president Leonid Kuchma called for the withdrawal of troops from Iraq. This was the primary cause that led to the direct pullout of 1,650 Ukrainian troops in December 2005. The Kazakh mission pulled out in 2008, suffering its sole fatality.
