= 221st Coastal Division =

Royal Italian Army infantry division during World War II

- Active: 1942 – 1943
- Country: Kingdom of Italy
- Branch: Royal Italian Army
- Size: Division
- Garrison/HQ: Pontinia
- Engagements: World War II

Insignia
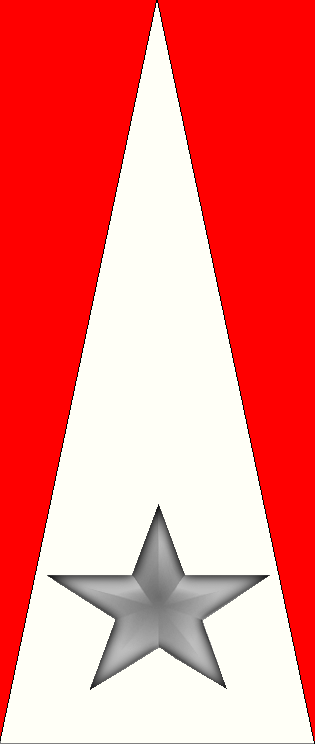
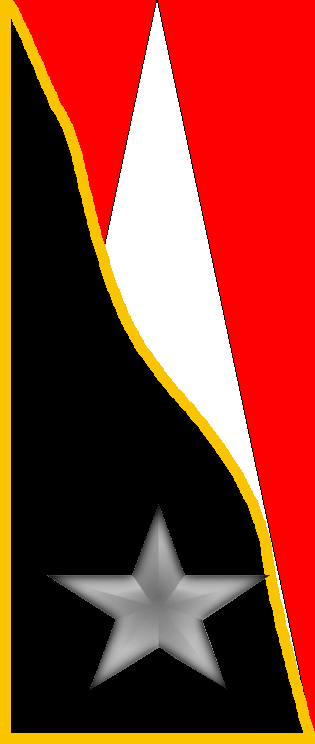
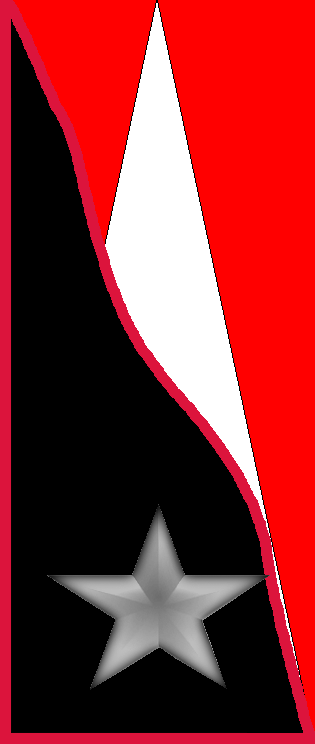
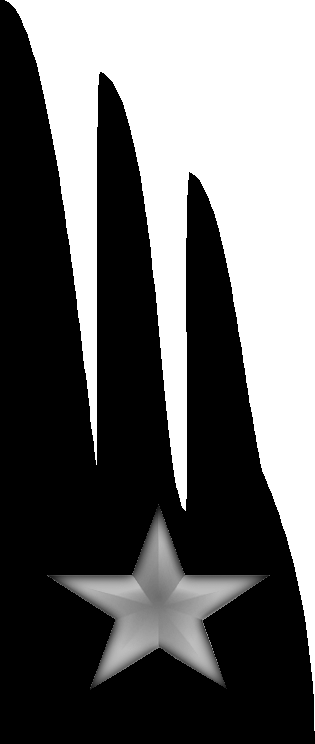
- Identification symbol: 221st Coastal Division gorget patches

The 221st Coastal Division (Italian: 221ª Divisione Costiera) was an infantry division of the Royal Italian Army during World War II. Royal Italian Army coastal divisions were second line divisions formed with reservists and equipped with second rate materiel. They were often commanded by officers called out of retirement.

== History ==
The division was activated on 15 April 1942 in Latina by uniting the two coastal defense sectors "Littoria" and "Gaeta". The division was assigned to XVII Army Corps and based its headquarter in Pontinia. The division was responsible for the coastal defense of the coast of southern Lazio between the rivers Astura and Garigliano.

After the announcement of the Armistice of Cassibile on 8 September 1943, the division was disbanded by invading German forces.

== Organization ==
- 221st Coastal Division, in Pontinia
  - 4th Coastal Regiment
    - 3 × Coastal battalions
  - 8th Coastal Regiment
    - 3 × Coastal battalions
  - II Dismounted Squadrons Group "Savoia Cavalleria"
  - 221st Carabinieri Section
  - Field Post Office
  - Division Services

If needed the artillery for the division would come from the following artillery schools located within the division's area of responsibility:

- Artillery School, in Sabaudia
- Coastal Artillery School, in Torre Olevola
- Maritime Artillery School, in Gaeta

== Commanding officers ==
The division's commanding officers were:

- Generale di Brigata Edoardo Minaja (15 April 1942 - September 1943)
