= Kaidar Karakulov =

Kazakhstani general

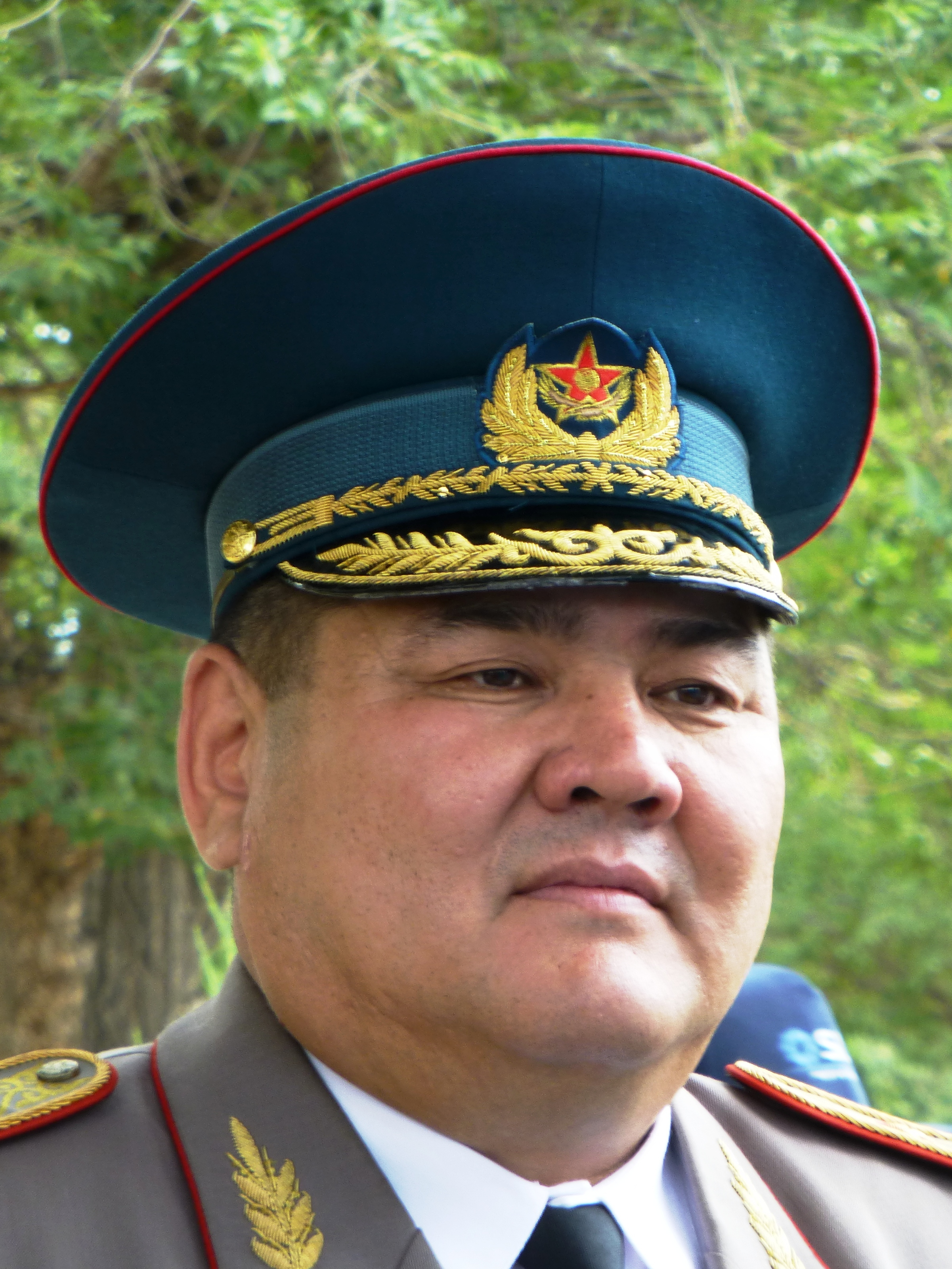
- Born: 9 June 1974 (age 52); Rabochy, Buguruslansky District, Orenburg Oblast, RSFSR, Soviet Union
- Military career
- Allegiance: Kazakhstan (1991-present)
- Branch: Kazakh Ground Forces
- Service years: 1991–present
- Rank: Major general

Major General Kaidar Samigullovich Karakulov (Russian: Кайдар Самигуллович Каракулов) is a Kazakh general. He last served as the commander the Regional Command "South" of the Kazakh Ground Forces.

== Early life and education ==
He was born 9 June 1974 in the Buguruslansky District of the Orenburg Oblast in the RSFSR. In 1991, he joined the Armed Forces of the Republic of Kazakhstan. He graduated from the Alma-Ata Higher All-Arms Command School. Ten years later, he graduated from the National Defense University. In 2012, he graduated from the Military Academy of the General Staff of the Armed Forces of Russia.

== Military career ==
Between his educational studies, he served as a tank platoon commander, a commander of a motorized rifle company, deputy brigade commander, and chief of staff in the office of a commander of forces. In 2010, he led the Kazakh contingent form the Honor Guard Company of the Ministry of Defense during the 2010 Moscow Victory Day Parade. By the decree of President Nursultan Nazarbayev on the occasion of the 25th anniversary of the Kazakh military, he was awarded the rank of Major General. In November 2016, he was appointed commander of units in the capital Astana. On 18 April 2018, he was relieved of his post as commander of the Astana Regional Command and was appointed commander of the Airborne Assault Forces of the Ground Forces. On 4 May 2019, he was appointed commander of the Regional Command "South".

On March 15, 2022, Kazakh President Kassym-Jomart Tokayev dismissed him from his post as Commander of the Regional Command "South".

On April 19, 2022, in agreement with the prosecutor's office, he was recognized as a suspect in a criminal case regarding the explosion at the arms depot in Jambyl Region the previous August, allegedly caused by fire which resulted in injuries and deaths of several military personnel. On April 21, he was released due to the lack of need to choose a preventive measure in the form of detention.

== Personal life ==
He is married to Roza Rakimzhanovna Karakulova, with whom he has 3 children.

== Awards ==
- Order of Glory, 2nd degree
- Medal "10 Years of Independence of the Republic of Kazakhstan"
- Medal "For Impeccable Service"
- Medal "For Contribution to the Development of International Cooperation"
- Medal "Tajik-Kazakh Exercises"
- Medal "10 Years of the Airmobile Forces"
- Baurzhan Momyshuly Medal
