= 36th Air Assault Brigade (Kazakhstan) =

36th Special Purpose Brigade
- 36-шы ерекше мақсаттағы бригадасы 36-я бригада особого назначения
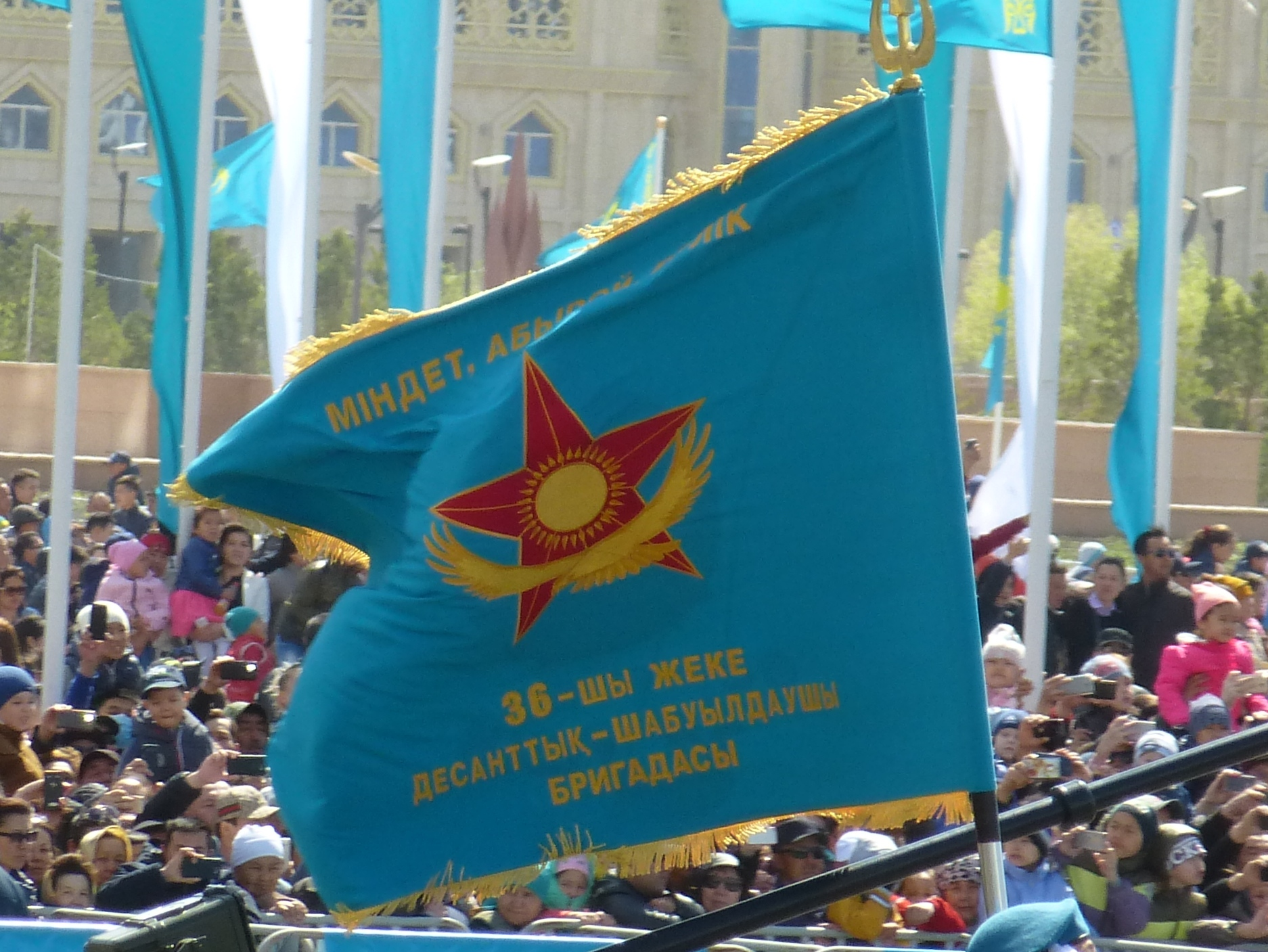
- Flag of the 36th Air Assault Brigade on 7 May 2017, Nur-Sultan.
- Active: 2002-present
- Country: Kazakhstan
- Branch: Air Assault Forces of the Ministry of Defense (2012-February 2023); Kazakh Ground Forces (February 2023–present)
- Type: Special Forces; Security
- Garrison/HQ: Astana

Commanders
- Current commander: Lieutenant Colonel Ulan Nurgaziyev

The 36th Special Purpose Brigade is a special forces brigade of the Kazakh Ground Forces. It is based in Astana.

== History ==
In 2002, the brigade was formed in Astana from the 46th Special Purpose Detachment. At the time, it only consisted of the 260th Air Assault Battalion, an artillery battalion and reconnaissance units. From 2011, the brigade was commanded by Major General Almaz Dzhumakeev (appointed commander of Kazakh Airmobile Forces in 2015). It tested Russian-made Irkut-3 UAVs in early 2013. On 24 May 2013, it was inspected by OSCE experts in accordance with the Vienna Document. In April 2013, the brigade was equipped with Otokar Cobra armored fighting vehicles. On 29 May 2015, it was inspected by OSCE experts in accordance with the Vienna Document. Since 2002, the brigade has controlled the Honor Guard Company of the Ministry of Defense of Kazakhstan. It was recognized as the best formation of the Armed Forces by the end of last 2019. In June 2020, fifty-five military personnel from the brigade under Lieutenant Colonel Ulan Nurgaziyev took part in the Moscow Victory Day Parade on Red Square.

In the February 2023, 36th Air Assault Brigade reorganized to 36th Special Purpose Brigade, with the change in combat mission, the unit now performs the function of guarding and defense of important strategic facilities, including Akorda Residence.
