= Pontinia =

- Comune
- Comune di Pontinia
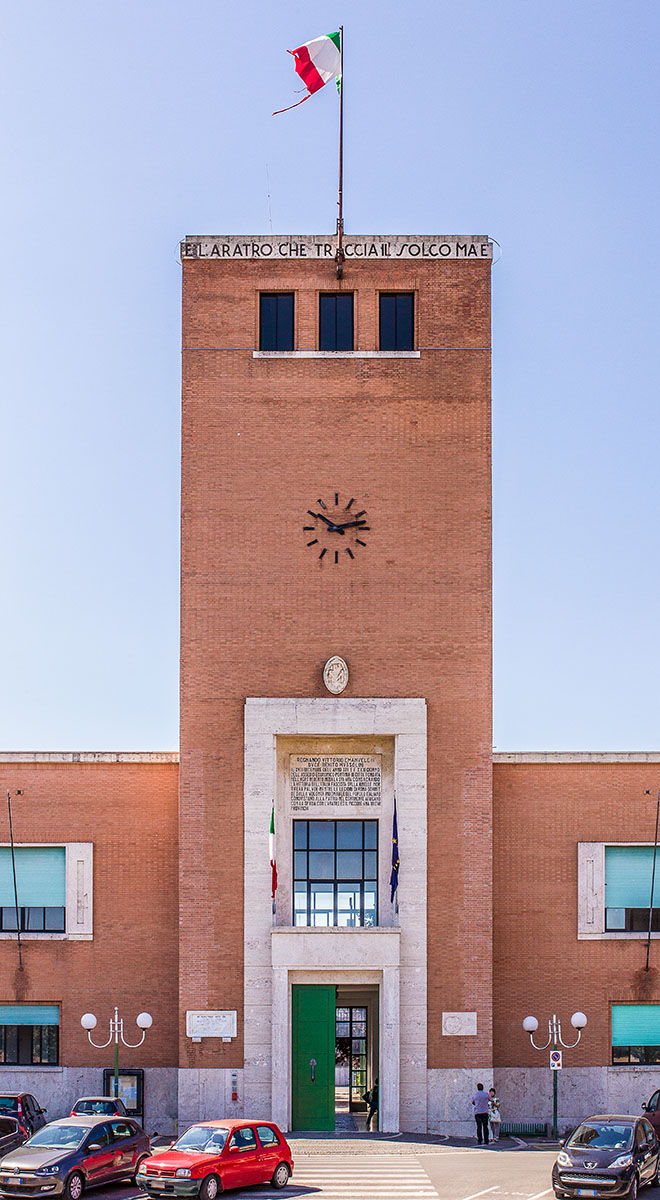
- The Town Hall

- Coat of arms

- Location within Italy Location within Lazio
- Coordinates: 41°24′N 13°3′E
- Country: Italy
- Region: Lazio
- Province: Latina (LT)

Government
  - Mayor: Eligio Tombolillo (Civic list)

Area
  - Total: 112.1 km^{2} (43.3 sq mi)
- Elevation: 4 m (13 ft)

Population (31 May 2022)
  - Total: 15,026
  - Density: 134.0/km^{2} (347.2/sq mi)
- Demonym: Pontiniani
- Time zone: UTC+1 (CET)
  - Summer (DST): UTC+2 (CEST)
- Postal code: 04014
- Dialing code: 0773
- ISTAT code: 059017
- Patron saint: St. Anne
- Saint day: July 26
- Website: Official website

Pontinia is a comune (municipality) in the Province of Latina in the Italian region Lazio, located about 70 kilometres (43 mi) southeast of Rome and about 15 kilometres (9 mi) southeast of Latina.

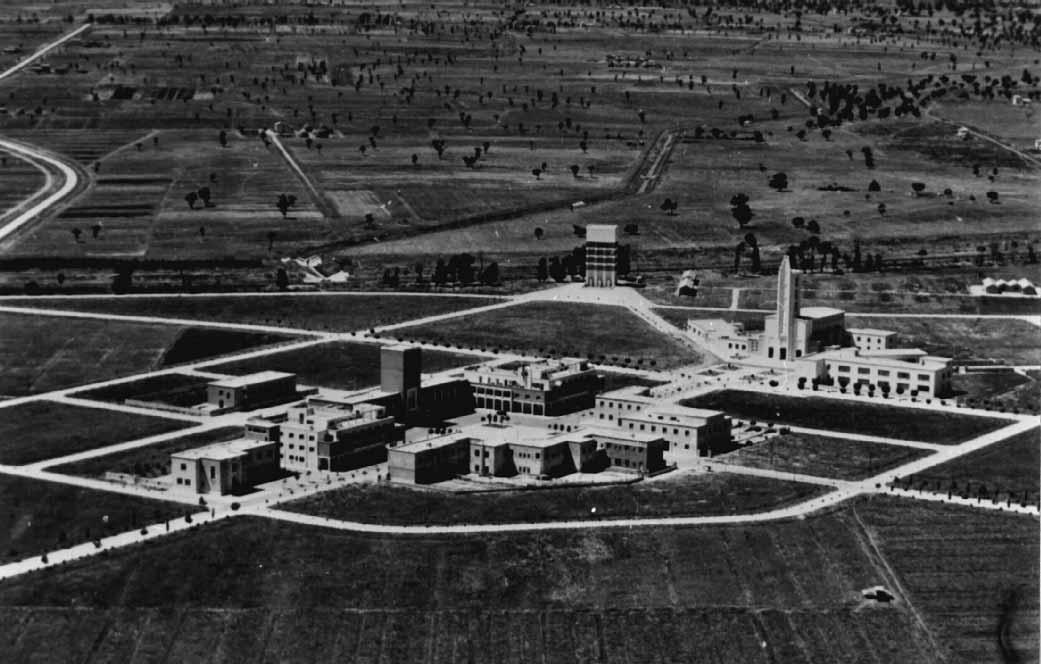
The town in 1939

Pontinia was established in 1935, as part of the project under the Dictatorship of Benito Mussolini which drained the Pontine Marshes and converted them to agriculture. The town plan was designed by engineer Alfredo Pappalardo, an employee of the Opera Nazionale Combattenti, the agency which oversaw the engineering works and settlement of the Pontine Marshes.

Pontinia borders the following municipalities: Latina, Priverno, Sabaudia, Sezze, Sonnino, Terracina.

== Twin cities ==
- Utena, Lithuania
- Vittoria, Italy
- Goro, Italy
