= Zelenga =

Zelenga Зеленга
- Selo
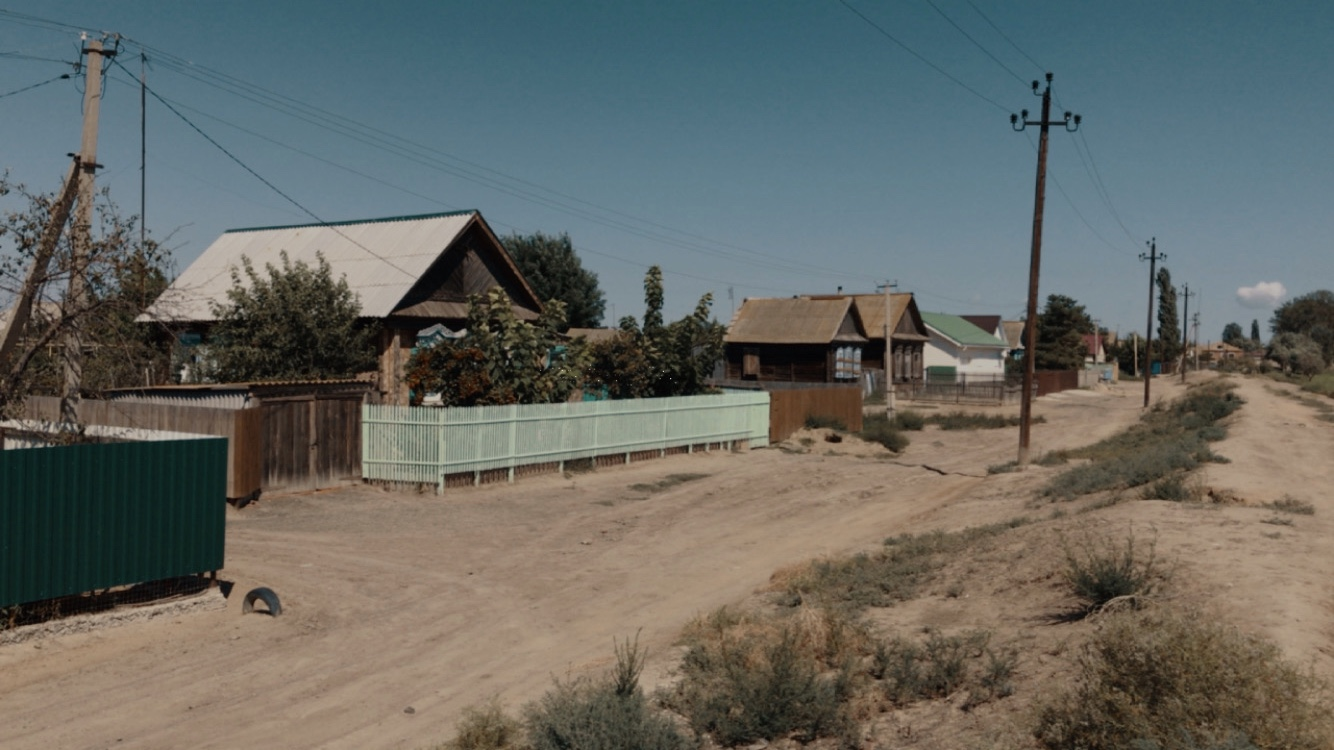
- Naberezhnaya Street in Zelenga

- Location within Astrakhan Oblast Location within Russia
- Coordinates: 46°10′N 48°36′E
- Country: Russia
- Region: Astrakhan Oblast
- District: Volodarsky District
- Time zone: UTC+4:00

Zelenga (Russian: Зеленга) is a rural locality (a selo) in Marfinsky Selsoviet of Volodarsky District, Astrakhan Oblast, Russia. The population was 2,834 as of 2010. There are 22 streets.

== Geography ==
Zelenga is located 32 km (20 mi) south of Volodarsky (the district's administrative centre) by road. Makovo is the nearest rural locality.
