= Kazakh Air Assault Forces =

- Десанттық-шабуылдау әскерлері
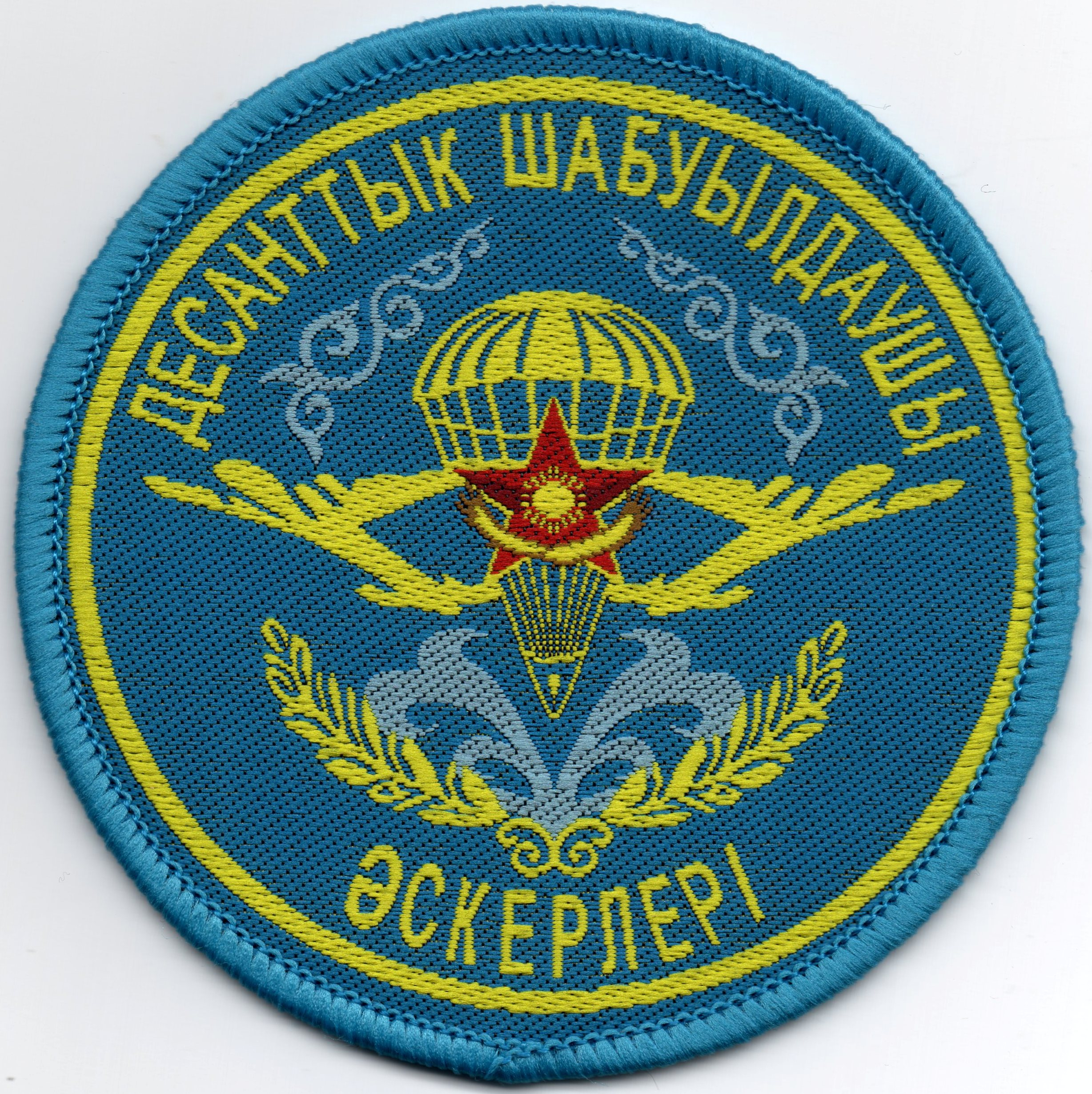
- Emblem of the force
- Founded: 6 July 2000; 26 years ago
- Country: Kazakhstan
- Type: Air assault forces Airborne forces Armoured forces Artillery forces Mechanized infantry
- Size: 20,000 Commander-in-Chief
- Part of: Kazakh Armed Forces
- Nickname: Blue Berets
- Mottos: Никто, кроме нас! (Nobody, but us!)
- Colors: Sky Blue
- Anniversaries: 6 July (Founding Day); 2 August (Paratroopers' Day)

Commanders
- Commander of the Air Assault Forces: Colonel Maksut Guseinov

The Kazakh Air Assault Forces (Kazakh: Десанттық-шабуылдау әскерлері, romanized: Desanttyq-şabuyldau äskerlerı; Russian: Воздушно-десантные войска Казахстана) or the Airmobile Forces (Kazakh: Аэроұтқыр әскерлері, romanized: Aieroūtqyr äskerlerı; Russian: Аэромобильные войска Казахстана) are the combined forces of air assault forces, airborne forces, armoured forces, artillery forces, and mechanized infantry branch of the Armed Forces of the Republic of Kazakhstan. It falls under the subordination of the Kazakh Ground Forces and is part of the Reserve of the Supreme Commander-in-Chief of the Armed Forces.

== History ==
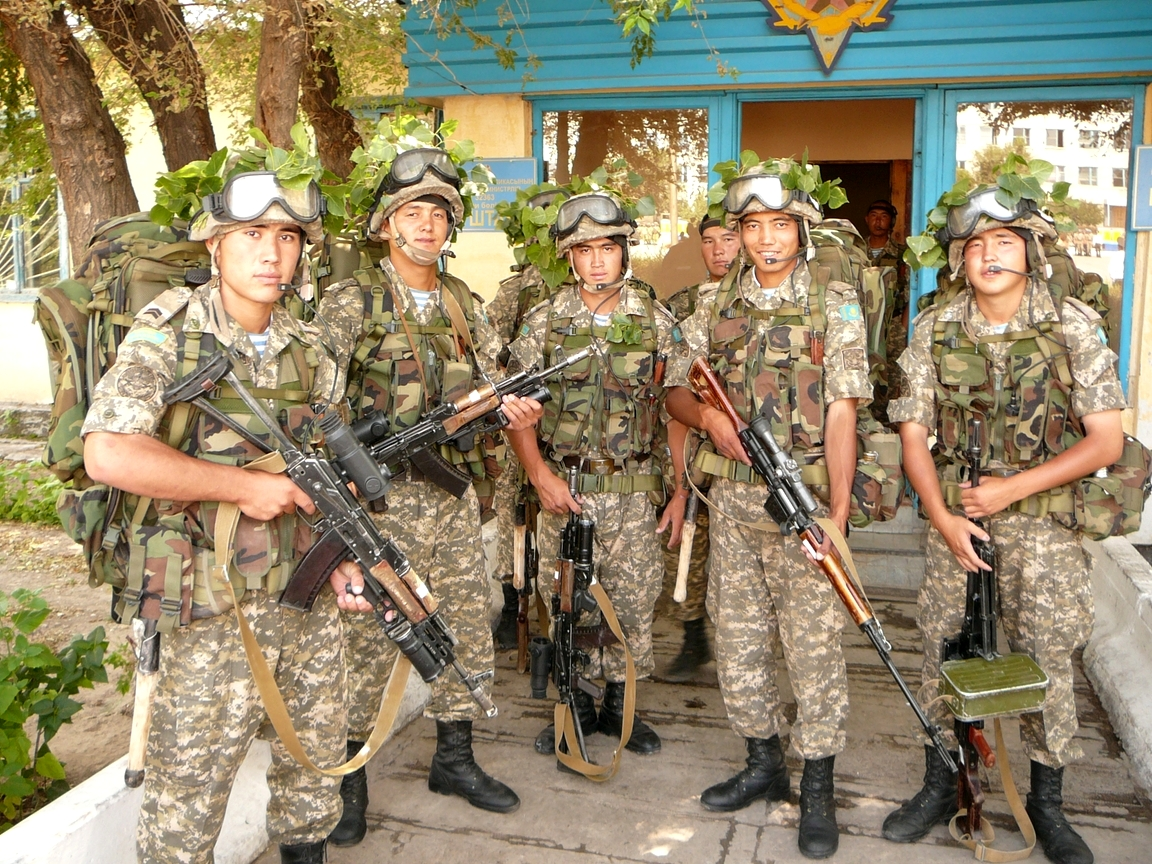
Paratroopers of the 35th Guards Air Assault Brigade

The Airmobile Forces were formed by grouping the 35th Guards Air Assault Brigade with new brigades formed from previous Soviet units. The 35th Guards Air Assault Brigade arrived from Germany in April 1991, and was taken over by Kazakhstan in 1992 in accordance with the establishment of the Kazakh military in May of that year. Also inherited from the Soviet airborne was the 5204th Base for Storage of Weapons and Equipment near Karaganda (the remnants of a motor rifle division). No units were stationed in Astana (then Tselinograd) during the Soviet period. In 1998, two motorized rifle brigades were created from the former storage base. One of which was left near Karaganda, and another called 2nd Separate Motor Rifle Brigade and was relocated 200 kilometers to the north of Nur-Sultan, which by that time was the capital, and for that reason ought to have a decent court garrison.

On July 6, 2000, by the decree of the President, the Mobile Forces were formed. Later, in 2003, they were renamed into Airmobile Forces. In October 2003, the 36th Separate Air Assault Brigade was formed on the basis of the 2nd Motor Rifle Brigade. On the basis of Taldykorgan Motor Rifle Regiment, 173rd Sary Ozekskoy Motor Rifle Division, in April 2003 was formed the 37th Separate Air Assault Brigade. In summer 2007, the Ministry of Defense downsized the KazBrig to a KazBat and redeployed it to the 38th Brigade's premises in Almaty. In 2017, the Airmobile Forces were renamed to the Air Assault Forces.

== Commanders ==
- Uali Elamanov (October 2001 – January 2002)
- Saken Zhasuzakov (January 2002 – 15 September 2003)
- Murat Maikeyev (15 September 2003 – 28 June 2009)
- Adylbek Aldabergenov (28 June 2009 – 13 February 2013)
- Daulet Ospanov (13 February 2013 – 15 October 2015)
- Almaz Dzhumakeev (15 October 2015 – 18 April 2018)
- Kaidar Karakulov (18 April 2018 – 4 May 2019)
- Kanysh Abubakirov (5 May 2019 - June 2021)
- Major General Mereke Kuchekbaev (June 2021 - March 2022)
- Major General Almaz Dzhumakeev (March 2022 - March 2026)
- Colonel Maksut Guseinov (since April 2026)

== Structure ==
- Kazakh Air Assault Forces
  - 35th Guards Air Assault Brigade at Kapshagai
  - 36th Air Assault Brigade at Nur-Sultan
    - Honor Guard Company
  - 37th Air Assault Brigade at Taldykorgan
  - 38th Air Assault Brigade (KAZBRIG Peacekeeping Brigade) at Almaty
  - KAZBAT-1 (UN Forces)
  - KAZBAT-2 (Collective Rapid Reaction Force)
  - KAZBAT-3 (Reserve)
  - 9th Mechanized Brigade (Jarkent)
  - 43rd Tank Brigade (Sary-Ozek)
  - 44th Artillery Brigade (Sary-Ozek)
  - Communication Brigade (Burundai)
  - Reconnaissance Regiment (Taldıqorğan)
  - NBC protection battalion (Kapchagay)
  - Parachute Training Center Kazakhstan (Karaganda)

=== KAZBRIG AND KAZBAT-1 ===
The peacekeeping brigade "Kazbrig" is part of the airborne troops, which belong to the Ground Forces. Kazbrig consists of three battalions, which can be conditionally called Kazbat-1, Kazbat-2 and Kazbat-3. Kazbat-1 is designed to participate in peacekeeping missions under the auspices of the UN. Kazbat-2 is designed to participate in peacekeeping operations within the framework of the Collective Security Treaty Organization (CSTO). Kazbat-3 is a reserve unit of Kazbrig.

=== KAZBAT-2 ===
Peacekeeping battalion "Kazbat-2" is designed to conduct peacekeeping operations within the framework of the Collective Security Treaty Organization. It, too, like Kazbat-1, is staffed only by officers and contract sergeants. However, this battalion does not need a UN certificate, and the personnel are not required to know English. But the personnel, in addition to the Kazakh language, must also know the Russian language, since interaction with the peacekeeping forces of other CSTO member states is carried out in Russian.

However, if the Collective Peacekeeping Forces of the CSTO will participate in UN missions, then they must also know the operational language of the mission. Many officers of Kazbat-2 also speak foreign languages, says Lieutenant Colonel Nigmetullin.

Kazbat-2 as part of the Collective Peacekeeping Forces (CPF) of the CSTO every year participates in peacekeeping exercises. The last such exercise called "Indestructible Brotherhood - 2015" took place two months ago at the Marshal Baghramyan training ground in Armenia.

== Training ==
The Parachute Training Center at Karaganda is designed to train highly qualified parachute specialists capable of performing medical evacuation, search and rescue, and tactical emergency medical services. It is also responsible for the development of parachuting sports in the Armed Forces. Airborne training is the same as it was in Soviet times, with two-week classes at the airborne facility and a mandatory two jumps from a 20-meter tower.

== Deployments ==
During the civil war in Tajikistan, in accordance with the decision of the countries of the Commonwealth of Independent States, one 300 man airborne assault battalion from the 35th Guards Air Assault Brigade was sent to Tajikistan to engage in peacekeeping. The KAZBAT is the main Kazakh peacekeeping military unit, falling under the Airmobile Force's KAZBRIG.

== Traditions ==
Troops of the Air Assault Forces traditionally wear a sky blue beret and blue-striped telnyashka, following the Russian precedent. Since 2016, the Assault Force have celebrated their professional holiday on July 6, the day in 2000 when the Mobile Troops. Previously, from 2000 to 2016, the official holiday was Paratroopers' Day celebrated on 2 August. 2 August was the official holiday of the former Soviet Airborne forces and commemorated military exercises of the Moscow Military District held on this day in 1930.

== See also ==
- Russian Airborne Forces
- Tajik Mobile Forces
- Ukrainian Air Assault Forces
