= 221st Separate Communications Brigade =

- Active: 1994–present
- Country: Soviet Union (1948–1992); Kazakhstan (1992–present)
- Branch: Soviet Army; Kazakh Ground Forces
- Type: Signals brigade
- Part of: Regional Command "South"
- Garrison/HQ: Taraz, Jambyl Oblast
- Nickname: Military Unit 28903

The 221st Separate Communications Brigade (Kazakh: 221-ші жеке байланыс бригадасы, Russian: 221-я отдельная бригада связи) is a signals brigade in the Kazakh Ground Forces. It is currently located near Taraz, Jambyl Oblast.

== History ==
=== Early years ===
The unit was formed in 1994 by a directive of the Minister of Defense General Sagadat Nurmagambetov in the form of a separate communications battalion with the main operational task to provide communications to the command post of the defense department. The first place of its permanent deployment was the village of Burundai near Almaty. A year later, the battalion changed its place of deployment as it was decided to transfer it to the village of Kirov, also near Almaty.

=== Regiment ===
By directive of the Minister of Defense, the battalion was transformed into a separate regiment, and then, in 2000, it was redeployed from the suburbs of Almaty to Taraz, and it became part of the troops of the Southern Military District (now the Regional Command "South"). The regiment's personnel had a hard time: the soldiers lived in tents, ate in field kitchens, military equipment and weapons were stored on open-air sites, the officers’ working day and contractors was irregular.

== Commanders ==
- Major Vladimir Shikhalev
- Major Meiram Khamzin
- Lieutenant Colonel Bolat Satylganov
- Lieutenant Colonel Alexei Kalizhanov (May 2007)
