= National Defense University (Kazakhstan) =

Coordinates: 51°4′40.9″N 71°23′30.5″E

National Defence University
- Ұлттық қорғаныс университеті Ūlttyq qorğanys universitetı Национальный университет обороны
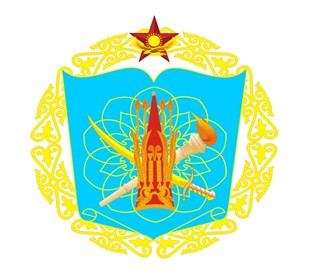
- The emblem of the school
- Other name: NDU
- Former name: Military Academy of the Armed Forces of Kazakhstan
- Type: Military academy
- Established: 1997; 29 years ago
- Founder: Government of Kazakhstan
- Affiliations: Armed Forces of the Republic of Kazakhstan
- Director: Major General Askar Mustabekov
- Location: Turan Avenue, Nur-Sultan, Akmola Region, Kazakhstan
- Language: Kazakh, Russian
- Colors: Light Blue
- Website: http://www.nuo.kz

The National Defence University named after the First President of the Republic of Kazakhstan - Elbasi (Kazakh: Қазақстан Республикасы Тұңғыш Президенті атындағы Ұлттық қорғаныс университеті - Елбасы, romanized: Qazaqstan Respublikasy Tūñğyş Prezidentı atyndağy Ūlttyq qorğanys universitetı - Elbasy; Russian: Национальный университет обороны имени Первого Президента Республике Казахстан — Лидера Нации) also known commonly as the National Defence University is a higher military educational institution for the training of senior officers in Kazakhstan's Armed Forces. It enrolls state officials, executive authorities, and officers of foreign armies. The main tasks of the NDU are to train officers to become professionals in the armed forces. It is currently led by the former head of the Kazakh artillery forces, Major General Lut Alchekenov.

== History ==
On February 11, 1997, the government issued an order to establish the Military Academy of the Armed Forces of Kazakhstan on the basis of the Alma-Ata Higher All-Arms Command School and was based in Shchuchinsk. In June of that same year, the regulations of the academy, as well as its tasks were issued. On August 21, 2003, by decree of President Nursultan Nazarbayev, the Military Academy of the Armed Forces of Kazakhstan was transformed National Defense University. In early 2014, the university was relocated from Shchuchinsk to the capital of Astana. On July 3, 2014, the NDU was named after the first and current President of Kazakhstan, Nursultan Nazarbayev and on April 15, 2015, the NDU joined the Association of European Universities.

== Role ==
=== The NDU within the CSTO ===
On November 30, 2005, the Collective Security Treaty Organization included the university in its list of educational institutions for joint training of military personnel of the CSTO. As of 2018, students from Kyrgyzstan, Armenia, and Tajikistan are studying at the NDU.

== Structure ==
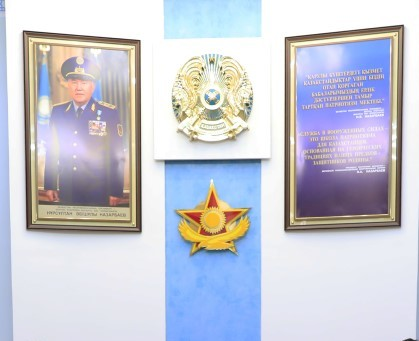
A hall in the NDU featuring national symbols as well as a photo of its patron, Nursultan Nazarbayev, in full dress uniform.

Training in the NDU is carried out in 4 faculties:

- Faculty of the General Staff of the Armed Forces
  - Department of Military and Public Administration
  - Department of Strategy
  - Department of Military and Public Administration
  - Department of Operational Art
  - Department of Command
- Faculty of Management
  - Department of Operational and Tactical Training
  - Department of Command and Control of Troops
  - Department of Missile Forces and Artillery
  - Department of Air Defense Forces
  - Department of Material and Technical Support
  - Department of Physical Training and Sports
- Faculty of the National Guard
  - Department of Operational and Tactical Training
- Faculty of Advanced Training
  - Academic Courses
  - Courses for officers of Regional Commands;
  - Courses for Brigade Commanders
  - Courses for Battalion Commanders
  - Foreign Language Courses

== Directors ==
- Major General Edil Urazov (November 2003 - August 2005)
- Major General Askhat Shoynbaev (August 2005 - November 6, 2008)
- Lieutenant General Bulat Dzhanasaev (July 17, 2009 - May 24, 2010)
- Major General Nikolai Kuatov (June 15, 2010 – April 25, 2012)
- Major General Askhat Ryspaev (April 25, 2012 - August 7, 2018)
- Colonel General Saken Zhasuzakov (7 August 2018 – 7 August 2019)
- Lieutenant General Sultan Kamaletdinov (18 October 2019 – 15 April 2022)
- Major General Lut Alchekenov (15 April 2022 - January 22, 2024)
- Major General Askar Mustabekov (January 22, 2024 – Present)

== Alumni ==
- Kanysh Abubakirov, Chief of the General Staff and former Commander of the Kazakh Airmobile Forces.
- Kaidar Karakulov, former Commander of the Kazakh Airmobile Forces.
- Murat Bektanov, former Chief of the General Staff.

== See also ==
- Ministry of Defense of Kazakhstan
- Armed Forces of the Republic of Kazakhstan
- Military Institute of the Kazakh Ground Forces
- Astana Zhas Ulan Republican School
