= 35th Guards Air Assault Brigade =

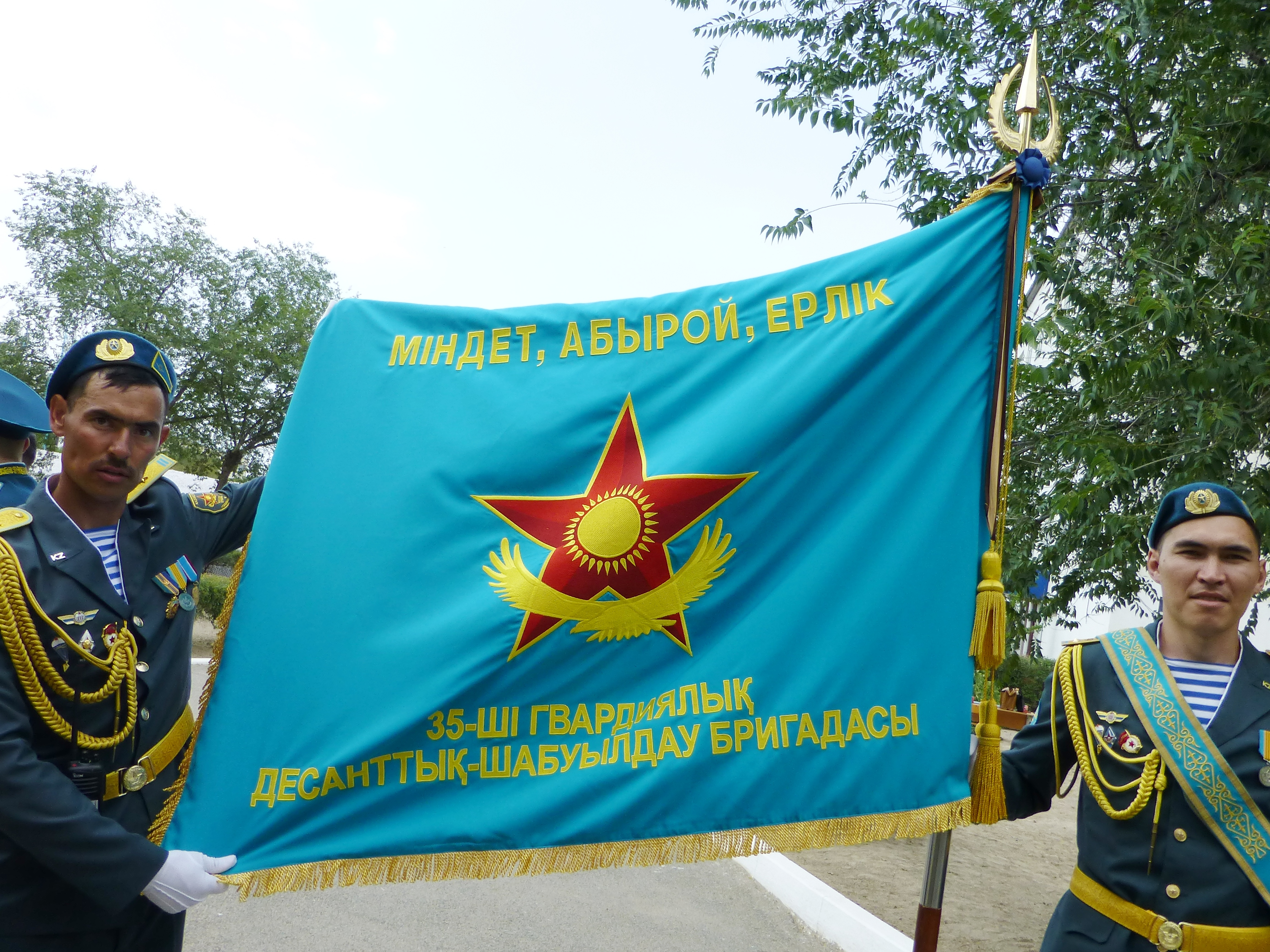
- Active: 1948–present
- Country: Soviet Union (1948–1991); Commonwealth of Independent States (1991–1992); Kazakhstan (1992–present)
- Branch: Soviet Army; Air Assault Forces
- Type: Air assault forces
- Garrison/HQ: Kapchagay
- Mottos: Міндет, Абырой, Ерлж (Duty, Honor, Rule)
- Engagements: Tajikistani Civil War

The 35th Guards Air Assault Brigade is an airmobile brigade of the Kazakh Air Assault Forces. It is currently based in Kapchagay. The brigade traces its history back to the Soviet Union as the 111th Guards Airborne Regiment, formed in 1948 as part of the 11th Guards Airborne Division. After the 11th Guards Airborne Division was disbanded in April 1955, the regiment became part of the 105th Guards Vienna Airborne Division. The 105th Guards Airborne Division was broken up in the fall of 1979 and the regiment became the 35th Separate Guards Air Assault Brigade.

After the Dissolution of the Soviet Union, the brigade became part of the Armed Forces of the Republic of Kazakhstan and was renamed to the 35th Separate Guards Air Assault Brigade.

== History ==
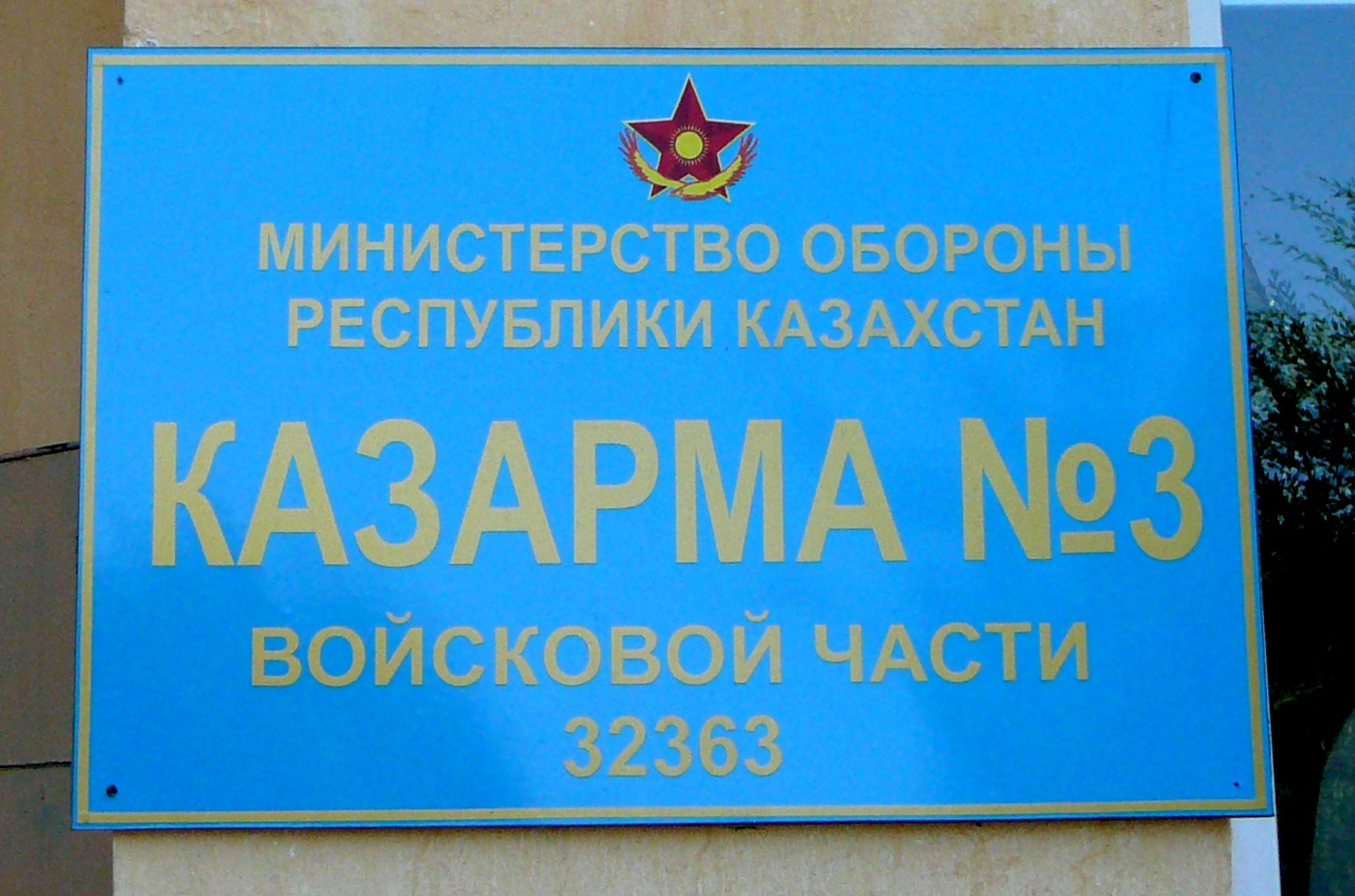
A sign on the brigade's barracks, indicating that its military unit number is 32363.

The brigade was formed on 1 October 1948 in Ryazan of the 111th Guards Airborne Regiment from elements of the 347th Guards Airlanding Regiment, part of the 11th Guards Airborne Division. In April 1955, the division was disbanded and the regiment transferred to the 105th Guards Vienna Airborne Division. In October 1956, the regiment was relocated to Rybinsk. The division was transferred to the Turkestan Military District in August 1960 and the regiment was relocated to Osh. In 1968, the regiment held joint exercises with the 351st Guards Airborne Regiment. The regiment reportedly showed solid skills for action in the mountain wilderness and was praised by higher command. In 1969, the regiment participated in tactical exercises with the troops of the Central Asian Military District and received a good evaluation. Its performance in exercises with the 345th Independent Guards Airborne Regiment and the 351st Guards Airborne Regiment were also evaluated as good. In 1973, it conducted exercises with the troops of the Central Asian Military District. The regiment was to "destroy" a separate missile battalion of a tank division. The regiment parachuted into four landing areas, which allowed them to immediately encircle the battalion's positions. Army General Nikolay Lyashchenko observed the exercises and thanked the paratroopers for their actions. The personnel of the regiment were systemically prepared for mountain warfare. The brigade conducted airdropping exercises to seize the dominant mountain heights and passes in event of a war. In 1967, the regiment's 1st Airborne Battalion was dropped on a plateau with an altitude of 3600 meters.

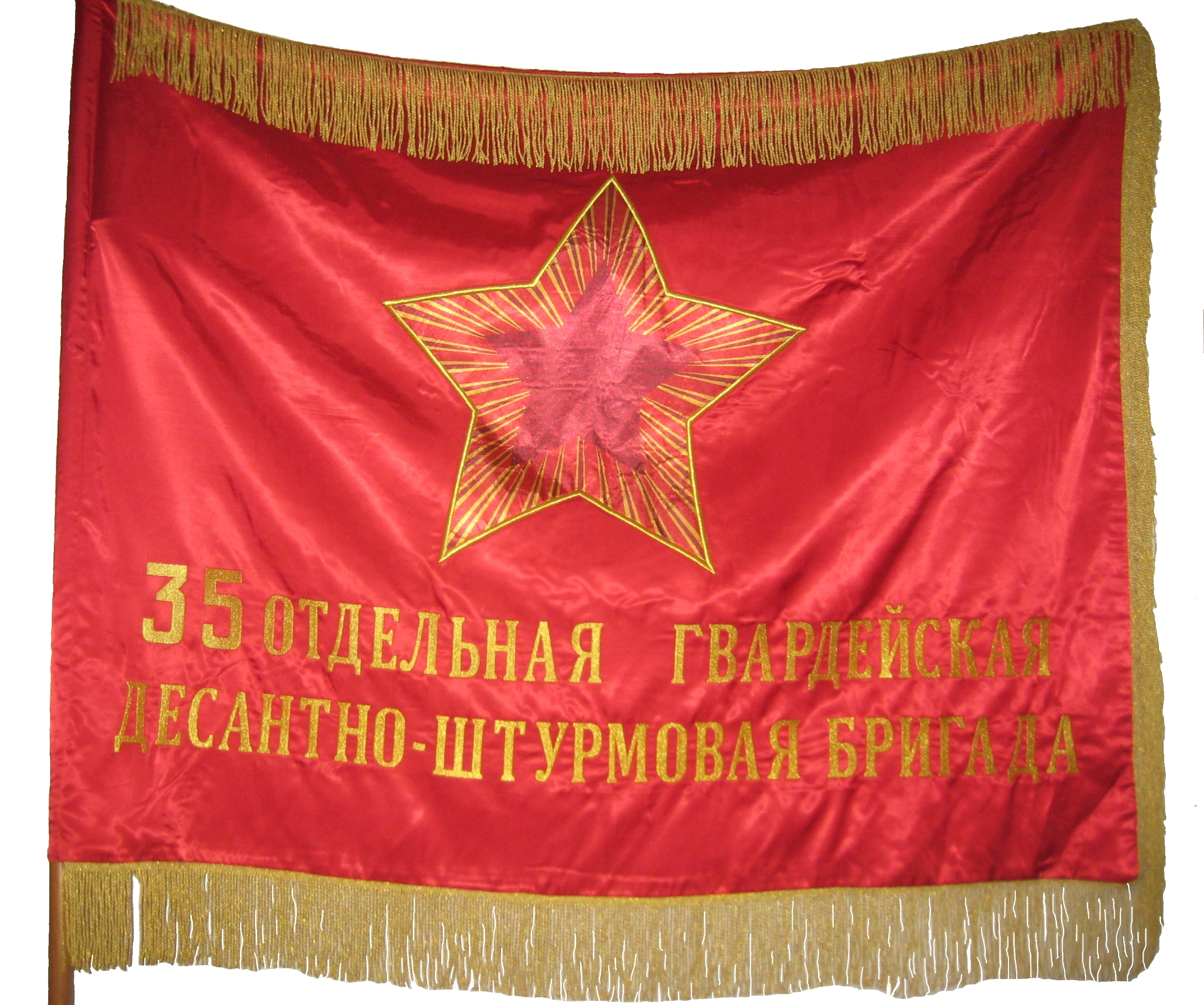
Soviet battle flag of the brigade

The difficulty of mountain training can be judged by the fact that only 15 out of the 200 soldiers in the 100th Separate Guards Reconnaissance Company and the 1st Airborne Company of the 345th Guards Airborne Regiment reached the summit of Peak Harvest in the Alay Mountains at an altitude of 4000 meters. On 27 July 1968, paratroopers were landed on the slopes of Lenin Peak at an altitude of 7100 meters. This group included ten men from the regiment. Before this dropping, a landing on the foot of Lenin Peak took place at an altitude of 6100 meters by 36 conscripts of the regiment under the command of Captain George Taynasa. According to the military authorities, the 111th was to land in Xinjiang and capture Urumqi in the event of large-scale conflict with China.

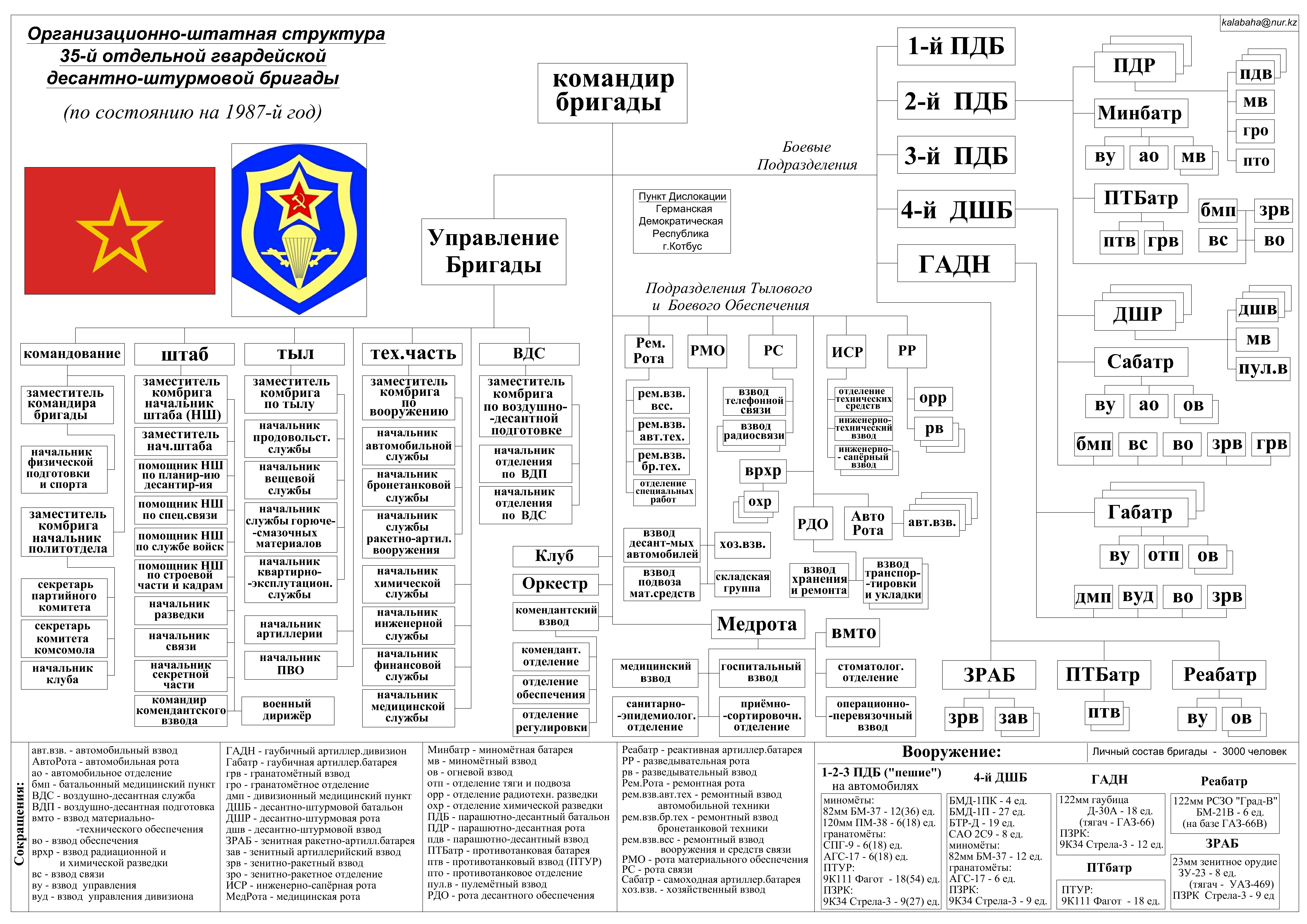
Brigade organization in 1987

In July 1979, its 2nd Battalion was deployed to Bagram to perform security tasks. After the Soviet Invasion of Afghanistan, the battalion became part of the 345th Independent Guards Airborne Regiment. In the fall, the division was broken up into three separate air assault brigades and the 345th Independent Guards Airborne Regiment. The 111th became the 35th Separate Guards Air Assault Brigade in October. The 104th Separate Guards Antiaircraft Artillery Battalion was also included in the new brigade. It was relocated to Cottbus in East Germany and subordinated to the Group of Soviet Forces in Germany. The official brigade formation day is considered to be 20 November, when its commander, Lieutenant Colonel Nikolai Shvets, issued his first order. In East Germany, the brigade was composed of as many as 3,000 soldiers.

In April 1991 it was moved from its garrison at Cottbus in the former East Germany to Kapchagay in the Kazakh SSR due to the withdrawal of Soviet troops from East Germany. On 28 May, the brigade arrived in Kapchagay in the Almaty Region of the Kazakh Soviet Socialist Republic. According to the plan of Soviet military leadership, the 35th Separate Guards Air Assault Brigade, 56th Separate Guards Air Assault Brigade and the 387th Separate Airborne Regiment would be used to reconstitute the 105th Guards Airborne Division. The brigade was ordered to begin the reformation of the 111th Guards Airborne Regiment, which was to be completed by 1 October 1992. The regiment was to be based in Kapchagay. In preparation for the reformation of the 111th, the brigade was renamed the 35th Guards Separate Airborne Brigade and transferred to the Soviet airborne. Due to the dissolution of the Soviet Union in December 1991, the 105th was not reformed and the brigade was withdrawn from the incomplete 105th Guards Airborne Division on 24 April 1992. It was taken over by Kazakh authorities on 13 May 1992.

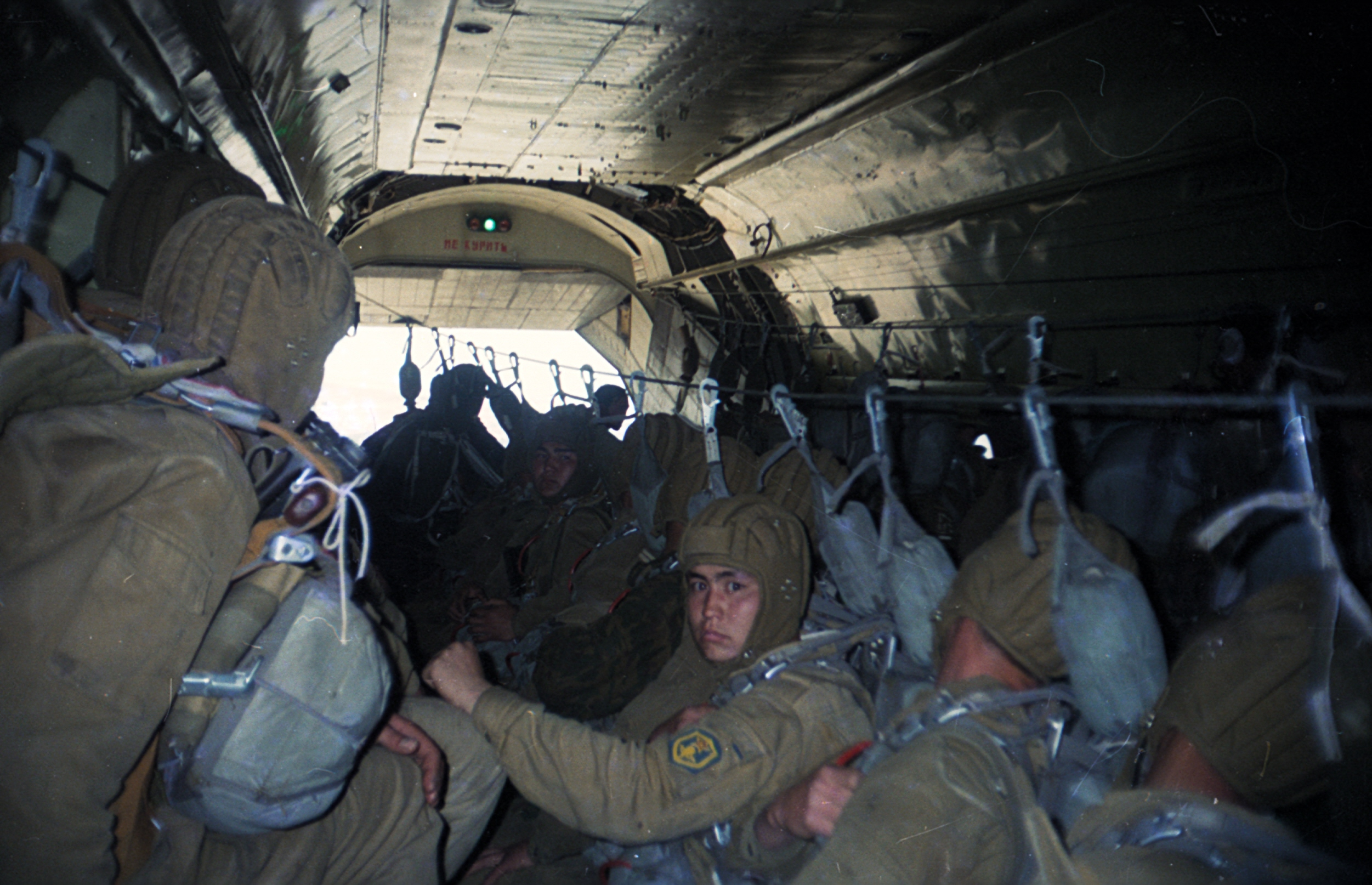
Soldiers of the brigade in an An-12 preparing for an airborne drop, 1996

From the summer of 1992 to July 1994 elements of the brigade formed a consolidated battalion with other Kazakh units and fought in the Tajikistani Civil War. The combined battalion suffered total casualties of 54 killed and missing. However, the brigade's elements in the combined battalion suffered none of these casualties. Between 1993 and 1996, the brigade was commanded by Ouali Yelamanov, who went on to command the Kazakh airmobile forces. On 20 April 1993 it was renamed the 35th Separate Guards Air Assault Brigade. Due to the outflow of Russian personnel and funding shortages due to the poor state of the Kazakh economy, there was a personnel shortage in the Armed Forces of Kazakhstan. The officer shortage forced Kazakh military leadership to reduce the size of units. The brigade was forced to disband the 4th Battalion, a reconnaissance company, and the airborne mortar batteries. It also reduced the size of the artillery battalions. By the summer of 1995, the brigade was composed of 1,500 soldiers.

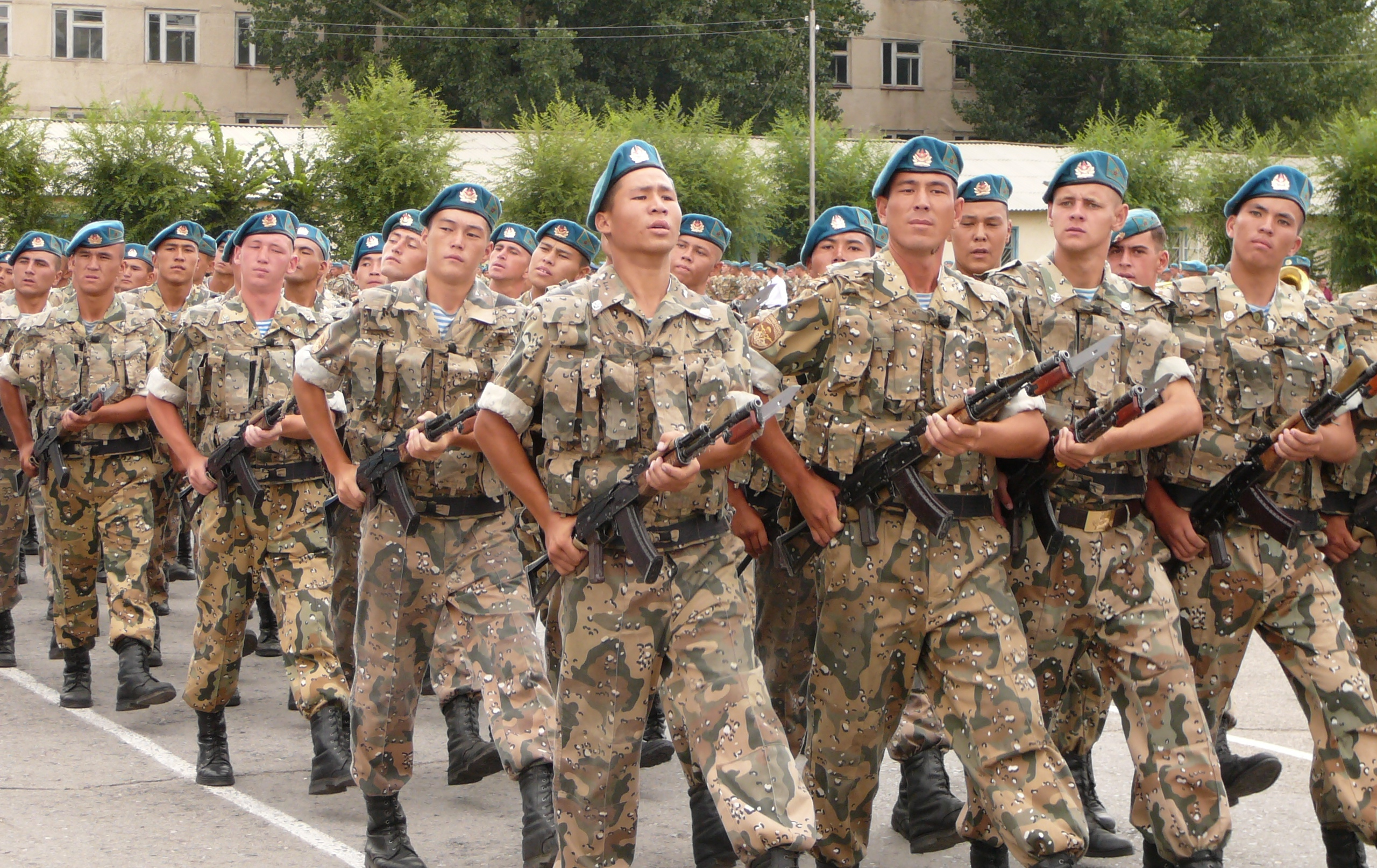
Soldiers of the brigade marching in honor of the Day of the Airborne Forces on 2 August 2007 in Kapchagay

The Kazakh Mobile forces were created on 6 July 2000. On 11 August, the brigade was subordinated to the Southern Military District. The brigade became part of the mobile forces on 1 February 2001. The mobile forces were renamed the Airmobile Troops on 12 November 2003. With the growth of the Kazakh economy and increased funding, a partial reformation of the disbanded units began. The mortar batteries, the reconnaissance company, a heavy machine gun company armed with the NSV-12.7 and a reactive artillery battery equipped with the BM-21 Grad were formed. Brigade units tested new parachute systems and powered paragliding. Currently, there are around 1,000 soldiers in the brigade.

== Composition ==
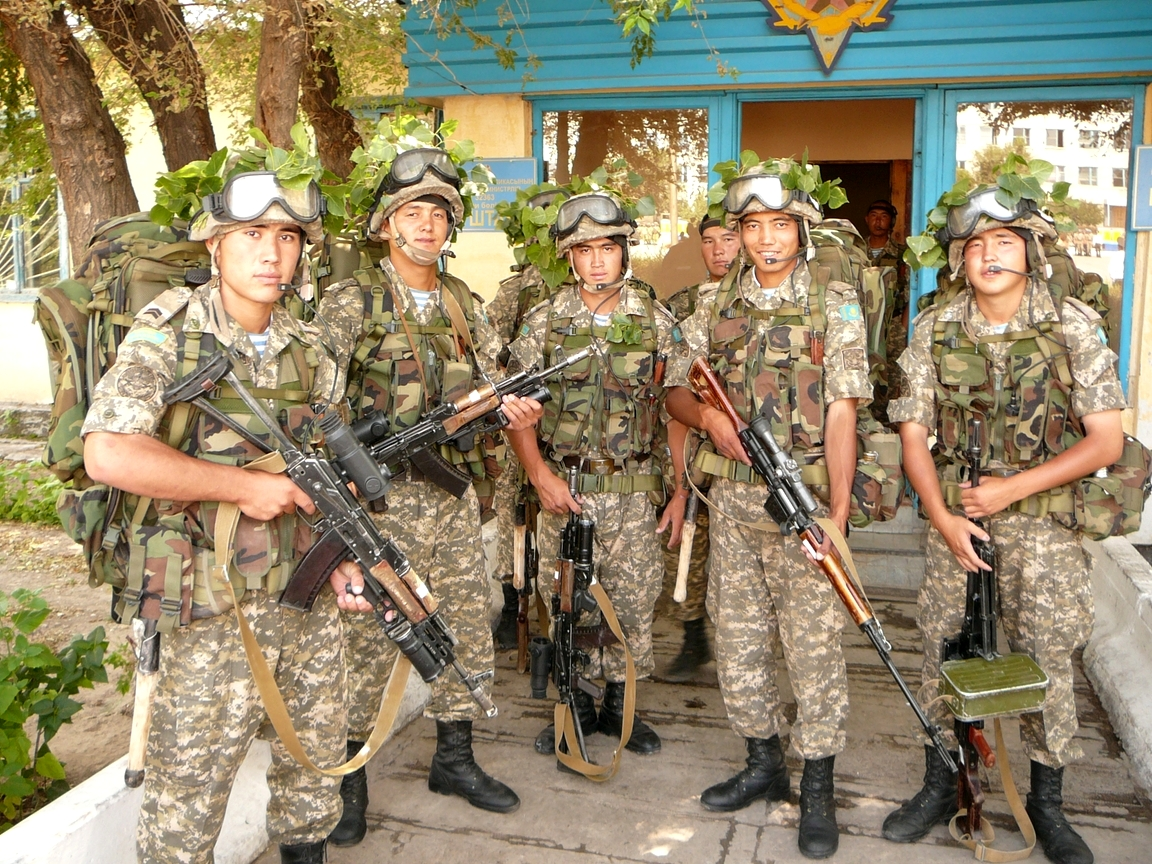
Paratroopers of the 35th Guards Air Assault Brigade

The brigade is currently composed of the following units.

- 351st Airborne Battalion
- 352nd Airborne Battalion
- 353rd Separate Air Assault Battalion
- Howitzer Artillery battalion
- Reactive Artillery Battery
- Antiaircraft Missile Battery
- Anti-tank missile Battery
- Heavy Machine Gun company
- Reconnaissance Company
- Communications Company
- Engineering Sapper Company
- Chemical Protection Company
- Medical Company

== Commanders ==
- Nikolay Shvets (1979—1985)
- Ivan Khimich (1985—1987)
- Alexander Fedotov (1987—1989)
- Gennady Borisov (1989—1990)
- Stanislav Semenyuta
- Alexander Novikov
- Ouali Yelemanov (1993–1996)
- Mukan Dyusekeev (1996—1998)
- Adylbek Aldabergenov (1998—2001)
- Talgat Koybakov
- Bakhyztzhan Ubek
- Arman Kutkuzhinov
- Yerzhan Kassenov
