= Kazakh Ground Forces =

Land forces of Kazakhstan

- Қазақстан Республикасының Құрлық әскерлері (Kazakh); Сухопутные войска Республики Казахстан (Russian)
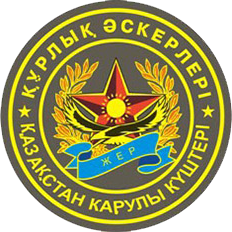
- Shoulder patch of the Kazakh Ground Forces
- Founded: 9 April 1993
- Country: Kazakhstan
- Type: Army
- Size: 80,000
- Part of: Armed Forces of the Republic of Kazakhstan
- Directorate of the Commander-in-Chief: 44 Victory Avenue, Astana
- Anniversaries: 7 May
- Engagements: Tajikistani Civil War; Iraq War

Commanders
- Supreme Commander-in-Chief: Kassym-Jomart Tokayev
- Commander-in-Chief of the Ground Forces: Major General Kuanyshbek Ushtaev

Insignia
- War flag

The Kazakh Ground Forces (Kazakh: Қазақстан Құрлық әскерлері, romanized: Qazaqstan Qūrlyq äskerlerı; Russian: Сухопутные войска Казахстана, romanized: Sukhoputnye voyska Kazakhstana) is the ground warfare branch of the Armed Forces of the Republic of Kazakhstan. It is one of the three uniformed military services, and the most senior branch of the Kazakh military in order of precedence. The main tasks of the Ground Forces include the following: maintaining the readiness of troops to repel aggression, the armed defense of the territorial integrity and sovereignty of Kazakhstan, protecting the state and military facilities, peacekeeping missions. In its duties, it primarily engages in land warfare and combined arms operations, including armored and mechanized operations as well as airborne and air assault operations. It is headed by a chief military officer, the commander of the Ground Forces, who is also a member of the General Staff.

== History ==
=== Soviet era ===
Many large units of the Turkestan Military District were redeployed from the Turkmen SSR to Eastern Kazakhstan back in the 1960s. Immediately prior to its dissolution, the 40th Army (Soviet Union), the former 32nd Army, consisted of the 78th Tank Division, the 5202nd Base for Storage of Weapons and Equipment (prior to 1989, the 71st Motor Rifle Division), the 5203rd Storage Base in Ust-Kamenogorsk (prior to 1989, the 155th Motor Rifle Division), the 5204th Storage Bade at Karaganda (prior to 1989, the 203rd Zaporozhye Khingan Motor Rifle Division), the 69th Tank Division and the 10th Fortified Area. The 69th Tank Division and the 10th Fortified Area were both disbanded in 1992.

The 57th Separate Airborne Brigade based in Aktogay, East Kazakhstan Region was the only unit of the Soviet Airborne Forces based in Kazakhstan.

=== Post-independence ===
The Kazakh Army was founded on 9 April 1993, by the order of Defense Minister Sagadat Nurmagambetov. It followed the enacting of the law, "On Defense and Armed Forces of the Republic of Kazakhstan", which is the legal basis for the Kazakh military structure. The former Soviet structure of troops was preserved, with the Kazakh Army being made up of the Soviet 32nd Army, which had been serving in the Kazakh Soviet Socialist Republic for many years before it came under Kazakh government control in May 1992. That month, on the basis of the 5203rd Military Equipment Storage Base (formerly the 155th Motorized Rifle Division), the 511th Motorized Rifle Regiment was re-formed with a deployment in the settlement. Georgievka, Semipalatinsk Region.

In the mid-1990s, the Kazakh Ground Forces included the 1st Army Corps (HQ Semipalatinsk), the 68th Motor Rifle Division (Sary-Ozek in the Kyzylorda Province), with 2 motor-rifle and one tank regiments, and the 78th Tank Division (HQ Ayaguz). The IISS reported that as of 1 June 1995 Kazakh ground forces included a corps HQ; a tank division; an artillery brigade; two motor-rifle divisions (one training); an artillery regiment; an independent motor rifle regiment; a multiple rocket launcher brigade with BM-21 and 9P140 "Urugan,"; and an air assault brigade. While the 68th Division was called a motor-rifle formation, in equipment terms it had almost 300 tanks and about 500 armored fighting vehicles. The 78th Tank Division had 350 tanks, 290 armored fighting vehicle, and 150 artillery pieces. The 210th Guards Training Center (often called the Division of Guards by Kazakh sources), had 6,000 soldiers and officers 220 tanks, and 220 artillery pieces, so was a strengthened division. In 1997, the 2nd Army Corps was created with headquarters in Almaty, under which all units and formations in the Almaty, Zhambyl and South Kazakhstan regions were transferred.

On 17 November 1997, the General Purpose Forces were formed. In 2000, on the basis of the 35th Guards Airborne Assault Brigade, the Mobile Forces of the Armed Forces were created, which in 2003 were renamed into Airmobile Forces as part of the Ground Forces. In 2015, Airmobile Troops were renamed Air Assault Troops. Since 2002, the ground forces have begun the transition to a brigade structure. In this regard, there was a process of disbandment of divisions and the creation of brigades on the basis of regiments.

== Structure ==
=== Regional commands ===
On July 6, 2000, military districts (Kazakh: әскери округтер) were created to control the ground forces:

- Central Military District (HQ Karaganda)
- Eastern Military District (HQ Semey)
- Western Military District (HQ Atyrau)
- Southern Military District (HQ Taraz)

The Eastern Military District was formed on the basis of the administration of the 1st Army Corps. The Directorate of the Southern Military District (Military Unit 03858) was created in Taraz on 15 September 2000, on the basis of the directorate of the 2nd Army Corps and the Directorate of the Ground Forces. On 7 May 2003, the military districts were renamed into regional commands (Kazakh: өңірлік қолбасшылықтар) Currently, the ground forces include four regional commands:

- Regional Command "Astana" (HQ Karaganda)
- Regional Command "East" (HQ Semey)
- Regional Command "West" (HQ Atyrau)
- Regional Command "South" (HQ Taraz)

Each of the commands have the following general composition:

- One mechanized division (comprising three tank regiments and one artillery regiment)
- One motor rifle division (comprising one tank brigade, two motor rifle regiments, and one artillery regiment)
- One training center with two motor rifle regiments
- One motor rifle training regiment
- One tank training regiment
- One artillery regiment
- Three independent motor rifle brigades
- Two artillery brigades
- One engineer brigade

==== Regional Command "Astana" ====
It is located within the administrative boundaries of Akmola, Karagandy Province, Kostanay Province and North Kazakhstan. The command acts as the Supreme Commander's reserve. The District includes the following units:

- 7th Separate Motor Rifle Brigade at Karaganda
- Reconnaissance Regiment at Aktas
- 401st Cannon Artillery Brigade at Ungurtas
- 402nd Rocket Artillery Brigade at Priozersk
- 403rd Anti-tank Artillery Brigade at Priozersk
- Training Center for Combat Training of Junior Specialists and the Reserve at Spassk
- Missile Forces and Artillery Training Center at Priozersk

The command has had the following commanders:

- Major General Vladimir Shatskov (September 2003–March 2010)
- Major General Muslim Altynbaev (March 2010–July 2013)
- Major General Sultan Kamaletdinov (July 2013–November 2016)
- Major General Kaidar Karakulov (November 2016–April 2018)
- Major General Dulat Adyrbekov (April 2018–December 2019)
- Colonel Mereke Kuchekbaev (January 2020–June 2021)
- Major General Shaikh-Hasan Zhazykbaev (June 2021–November 2023)
- Major General Erzhan Ibraev (November 2023–November 2024)
- Colonel Makhsut Guseinov (November 2024–April 2026)
- Colonel Baglan Userbaev (since April 2026)

==== Regional Command "East" ====
It is located within the administrative boundaries of East Kazakhstan and Pavlodar Province (Families, Ust-Kamenogorsk, George, and Ayagoz Usharalsky Garrisons). The District has the following units:

- 3rd Mechanized Brigade (formerly the 78th Tank Division) at Ayaguz
- 3rd Separate Motor Rifle Brigade at Usharal (Military Unit No.40398, formed on the basis of a motor rifle regiment of the 155th Motor Rifle Division)
- 4th Mechanized Brigade at Novo-Akhmirovo, Ust-Kamenogorsk (Military Unit No.27943)
- 8th Mechanized Brigade at Semey. On 14 November 2016 the brigade, Military Unit 30217, celebrated the 27th anniversary of its originator, the 71st Motor Rifle Division.
- 11th Tank Brigade at Ayagoz
- 34th Artillery Brigade at Usharal
- 101st Missile Brigade at Semey
- 102nd Rocket Artillery Brigade at Semey
- 103rd Cannon Artillery Brigade at Semey
- Separate Reconnaissance Regiment at Semey
- Separate Communications Brigade at Semey
- Artillery Brigade
- Air Defence Missile Brigade
- Three Storage Bases

The command has had the following commanders:

- Lieutenant General Bulat Janasayev (September 2003–December 2004)
- Major General Saken Zhasuzakov (December 2004–April 2007)
- Lieutenant General Nikolai Pospelov (April 2007–March 2010)
- Major General Vasily Rysbayev (March 2010–July 2013)
- Major General Murat Bektanov (July 2013–June 2016)
- Major General Nurlan Kashaganov (June 2016–September 2019)
- Major General Asan Zhusupov (September 2019–April 2022)
- Major General Kuanyshbek Ushtaev (April 2022–November 2023)
- Major General Zhenis Maralov (since November 2023)

==== Regional Command "West" ====
It is located within the administrative boundaries of the West Kazakhstan Province, Aktobe Province, Atyrau Province and Mangystau Province. The main task is ensuring the integrity of state borders, territorial integrity, sovereignty and economic interests of Kazakhstan in the Kazakh sector of the Caspian Sea. The District has the following units:

- 100th Artillery Brigade at Aktobe (reportedly the former 2028th VKhVT with в/ч 32355)
- Separate Motorized Rifle Battalion at Aktobe
- 390th Guards Naval Infantry Brigade at Aktau
- Separate Reconnaissance Regiment at Atyrau
- Separate Motorized Rifle Battalion at Beineu
- Separate Motor Rifle Brigade
- Artillery Brigade

The command has had the following commanders:

- Rear Admiral Ratmir Komratov (September 2003–November 2008)
- Major General Alimzhan Erniyazov (November 2008–July 2009)
- Major General Amir Khalikov (July 2009–July 2013)
- Colonel Murat Nugmanov (July 2013–September 2015)
- Colonel Daulet Ospanov (October 2015–December 2017)
- Major General Kanysh Abubakirov (December 2017–May 2019)
- Major General Nurlan Aldiyarov (May 2019–June 2022)
- Major General Daulet Ospanov (June 2022–February 2024)
- Major General Bauyrzhan Artykov (February 2024–March 2026)
- Colonel Nurlan Karibaev (since April 2026)

==== Regional Command "South" ====
It is located within the administrative boundaries of Almaty Province, Zhambyl Province, South Kazakhstan Province and Kyzylorda Province. The district's main task is ensuring security in the southeastern borders of the country. The District includes the following:

- 5th Mountain Rifle Brigade at Taraz
  - Separate Motor Rifle Battalion at Lugovoi
  - Separate Tank Battalion at Lugovoi
  - Separate Reconnaissance Battalion at Lugovoi
  - Separate Motor Rifle Battalion at Merke
- 6th Mechanized Brigade at Shymkent
- Separate Mountain-Jaeger Regiment
- 40th Otar Military Base
  - 12th Mechanized Brigade
  - 54th Guards Artillery Brigade
  - 23rd Engineer Brigade
  - Training Center of the Ground Forces named after Karasai Batyr
- 221st Separate Communications Brigade at Taraz
- 232nd Engineer Brigade at Kapchagai

The command has had the following commanders:

- Major General Uali Elamanov (September 2003—May 2004)
- Major General Bakhtiyar Syzdykov (May 2004—April 2007)
- Lieutenant General Bulat Darbekov (April 2007—November 2008)
- Major General Alikhan Dzharbulov (November 2008–February 2012)
- Major General Talgat Koibakov (February 2012–June 2016)
- Major General Marat Khusainov (June 2016–May 2019)
- Major General Kaidar Karakulov (May 2019–March 2022)
- Major General Mereke Kuchekbaev (March 2022–November 2023)
- Major General Kuanyshbek Ushtaev (November 2023–November 2024)
- Major General Erzhan Ibraev (since November 2024)

=== Air Assault Forces ===
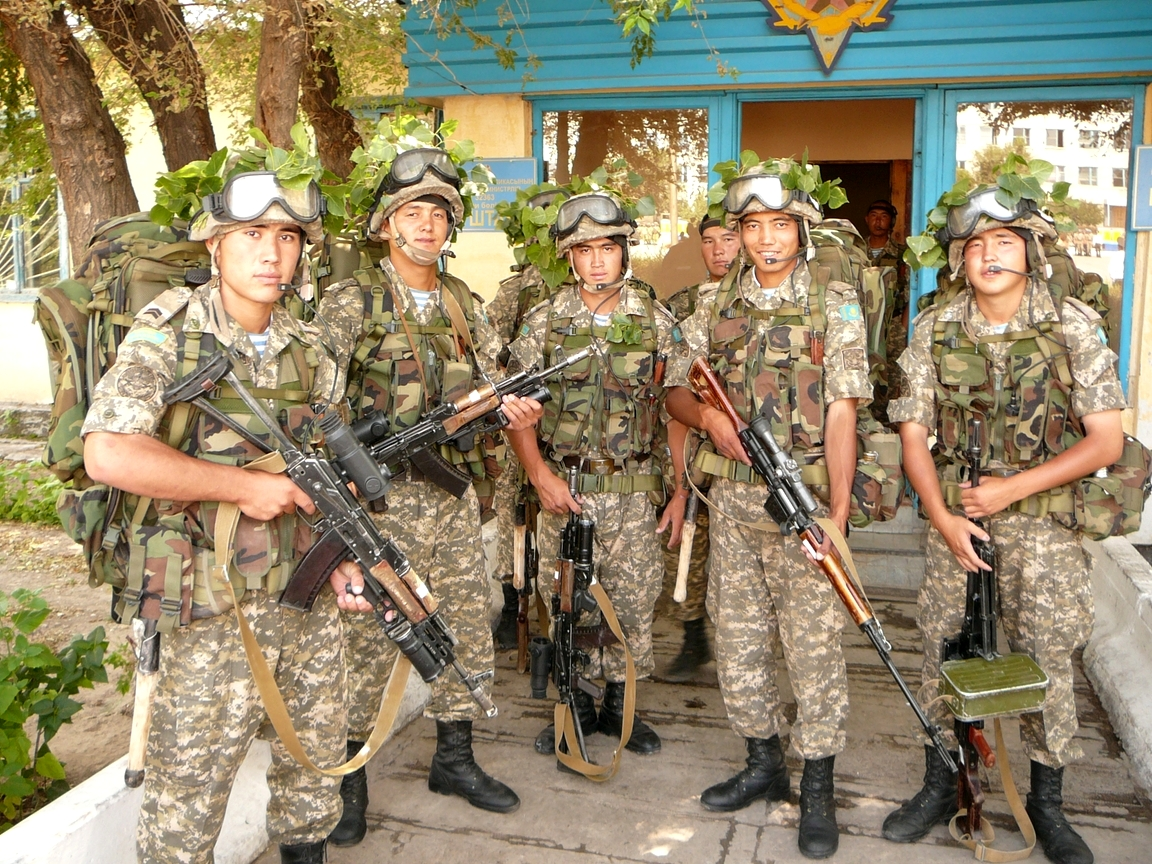
Paratroopers of the 35th Guards Air Assault Brigade

The Kazakh Air Assault Forces were formed by grouping the 35th Guards Air Assault Brigade (which arrived from Germany in April 1991 and was taken over by Kazakhstan in 1992) with new brigades formed from previous Soviet units. In October 2003, the 36th Separate Air Assault Brigade was formed on the basis of the 2nd Motor Rifle Brigade. On the basis of the Taldykorgan Motor Rifle Regiment, in April 2003 the 37th Separate Air Assault Brigade was formed. The 38th Air Assault Brigade is also known as the KAZBRIG Peacekeeping Brigade and was given its current name in 2007.

The Airmobile Forces consists of the following units:

- 35th Guards Air Assault Brigade (Kapshagai)
- 36th Air Assault Brigade (Astana)
- 37th Air Assault Brigade (Taldykorgan)
- 38th Air Assault Brigade

=== Artillery and Missile Forces ===
The Artillery and Missile Forces of Kazakhstan was formed in 1992 on the basis of the headquarters of the Missile Forces and Artillery of the Central Asian Military District of the Soviet Armed Forces. At first, they were structurally part of the Special Forces of the Ministry of Defense, and then the General Purpose Forces. Since 2003, they have operated as a separate branch of the military under the Ground Forces. Units and subunits are equipped with all the necessary types of missile and artillery systems of caliber from 82 to 300 mm.

The Department of Artillery has been operating at the Military Institute of the Ground Forces since 1993, which annually graduates up to 60 officers-artillerymen. In 2014, on the basis of the National University of Defense, the Department of Missile Forces and Artillery was created. Professional officers of this profile are also trained at the Mikhailovskaya Military Artillery Academy in St. Petersburg. Additionally, the forces are replenished by graduates of the military departments of the Karaganda State Technical University and the Almaty Satbayev University. In 1998, at the Matybulak training ground, three Tochka-U tactical missiles were launched, the launch of the first rocket from which was then carried out by President Nazarbayev. In 2002, at the Saryshagan training ground, operational-tactical exercises of the Rocket Forces and Artillery “Shield of the Motherland” were held.

19 November is celebrated as the Day of Missile Forces and Artillery.

Regional commands of Kazakhstan

== Training ==
=== Military institute ===
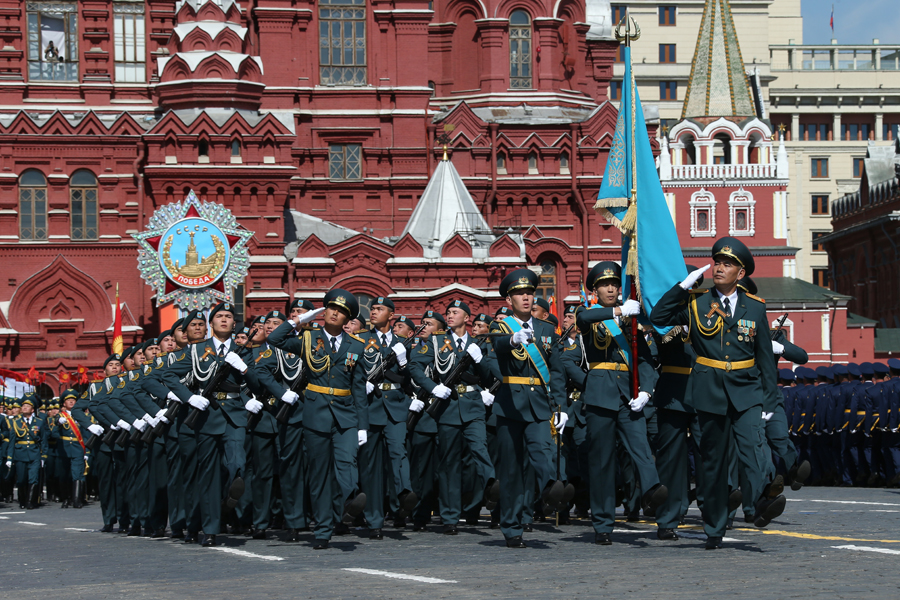
Cadets of the military institute on Red Square during a 2015 Victory Day parade in Moscow

The Military Institute of the Kazakh Ground Forces (Kazakh: Qurlyq áskerleriniń áskerı ınstıtýty / Құрлық әскерлерінің әскери институты) is the main educational institute of the Ground Forces and one of the leading Kazakh military academies. It has many notable alumni, including Lieutenant General Murat Maikeyev, Colonel General Saken Zhasuzakov and Major General Abibilla Kudayberdiev.

=== Junior specialist training ===
The training of junior specialists of rank and file in military accounting specialties for the Ground Forces is carried out in the following training centers:

- Training Center for Junior Specialists of the Kazakh Ground Forces named for Karasai Batyr – Jambyl Region
- Training Center for Combat Training of Junior Specialists and the Reserve of the Ground Forces – Spassk, Karaganda
- Training Center of the Missile Forces and Artillery – Priozersk, Karaganda

=== Cadet Corps ===
The Cadet Corps named after Shoqan Walikhanov is an institution of the Ministry of Defense was formed on 1 July 1996 as a secondary school that prepared Kazakh youth for service in the military. A month after its formation, the corps had 96 enlisted cadets, most of whom came from the Alma-Ata Higher All-Arms Command School. On its first graduation day in 1999, the corps received its own battle flag from the then head of the corps, Colonel Kuangaliev, and defense minister Mukhtar Altynbayev. The corps is currently based in the city of Shchuchinsk in the Akmola Region.

=== Foreign education ===
Some of Kazakhstan's officers have trained at the United States Military Academy at West Point.

== Equipment ==
=== Small arms ===
Name	Origin	Caliber	Notes	Image
Pistols
Makarov	USSR	9×18mm Makarov		
Stechkin	USSR	9×18mm Makarov		
Glock 17	Austria	9×19mm	Used by special forces	
Assault rifles
AK-47	USSR	7.62×39mm		
AKM	USSR	7.62×39mm		
Beretta ARX160	Italy	7.62×39mm	Used by special forces	
AK-74	USSR	5.45×39mm	Standard assault rifle	
Machine guns
RPK-74	USSR	5.45×39mm		
PK machine gun	USSR	7.62×54mmR		
Designated marksman rifles
SVD Dragunov	USSR	7.62×54mmR		
Grenade launcher
AGS-17	Soviet Union	30mm grenade		
GP-25	Soviet Union	40mm grenade		
Man-portable anti-tank systems & Shoulder-fired missile
RPG-7	Soviet Union	85mm anti-tank round		
RPG-16	Soviet Union	58.3mm anti-tank round		
RPG-18	Soviet Union	64mm anti-tank round		
RPG-26	USSR	72.5mm anti-tank round		

=== Main battle tanks ===
Name	Photo	Origin	Type	In service	Notes
T-72BA		Kazakhstan	Main battle tank	350	

=== Infantry fighting vehicles ===
Name	Photo	Origin	Type	In service	Notes
BMP-2		USSR	Infantry fighting vehicle	280	Kazakhstan has mastered its own production of 30 mm shells for 2A42.
BMP-1		USSR	Infantry fighting vehicle	60	

=== Tank support combat vehicles ===
Name	Photo	Origin	Type	In service	Notes
BMPT-72 Terminator 2		USSR / Russia	Tank destroyer		Chassis from Soviet T-72 tank

=== Armored personnel carriers ===
Name	Photo	Origin	Type	In service	Notes
Barys 8x8		Kazakhstan	Armored personnel carrier		
BTR-82		Russia	Amphibious armoured personnel carrier		
BTR-80A		Russia	Amphibious armoured personnel carrier		
BTR-80		USSR	Amphibious armoured personnel carrier		
BTR-60		USSR	Amphibious armoured personnel carrier		Only in the modification KShMР-145БМ
MT-LB		USSR	Amphibious armoured personnel carrier		

=== Combat reconnaissance and reconnaissance patrol vehicles ===
Name	Photo	Origin	Type	In service	Notes
Arlan		Kazakhstan/South Africa	Infantry mobility vehicle	200+	Arlan is a multi–purpose armored wheeled vehicle with enhanced mine protection of the MRAP type. Produced at the Kazakhstan Paramount Engineering LLP.
Otokar Cobra		Turkey	Infantry mobility vehicle	17+	Manufactured locally with license
Cobra II		Turkey	Infantry mobility vehicle	?/45	It is planned to purchase 45 units of these vehicles for the needs of the Special Operations Forces of the Armed Forces of the Republic of Kazakhstan.
Humvee		United States	Armored car	40	
GAZ Tigr		Russia	Infantry mobility vehicle	21	
BRM-1		USSR	БРМ	60	
BRDM-2		USSR	БРМ	40	
BPM-97		Russia	Armoured personnel carrier, MRAP	18	

=== Surveillance unmanned aerial vehicles ===
Surveillance unmanned aerial vehicles
Name	Origin	Photo	In service	Notes
Surveillance unmanned aerial vehicles
Elbit Skylark I-LEX	Israel		unknown	In service since 2014.
Unknown Elbit UAV	Israel		unknown	
Orlan-10E	Russia		unknown	
Unmanned combat aerial vehicles
CAIG Wing Loong I	China		4	In service since 2016 (can be armed with two Blue Arrow 7 AGMs or YZ-100 guided bombs)
TAI Anka	Turkey		3	In service since 2022 (can be armed with four MAM-L or MAM-C guided bombs)
Unmanned aerial vehicles - prototypes
Shagala	Kazakhstan		unknown	
Leyla	Kazakhstan		unknown	
