= Collective Rapid Reaction Force =

Joint combined arms task force of the Collective Security Treaty Organisation

- Emblem of the CSTO
- Founded: February 4, 2009; 17 years ago
- Country: Armenia; Belarus; Kazakhstan; Kyrgyzstan; Russia; Tajikistan
- Allegiance: CSTO
- Branch: Spetsnaz; Airborne forces Marine forces
- Type: Combined arms
- Joint Staff: Moscow
- March: Solemn march of the CSTO Forces (Торжественный марш Войск ОДКБ)

The Collective Rapid Reaction Force (Russian: Коллективные силы оперативного реагирования, КСОР; KSOR) is a joint combined arms task force comprising independent military units from the Collective Security Treaty Organization member states. CRRF was created in 2009 with the general purpose to counter a limited military aggression against CSTO member states, to fight against terrorism and drug trafficking.

== History ==
The agreement on the creation of the Collective Rapid Reaction Force was signed by the presidents of all CSTO states except Belarus during a summit in Moscow on February 4, 2009. Belarus joined the agreement on October 20 of the same year.

The first joint exercises of CRRF were held in October 2009 at Matybulak firing range in Kazakhstan near the border with China.

== Composition ==
According to Russian media, CRRF currently comprises the following units:

- Russia
  - 98th Guards Airborne Division (Ivanovo)
  - 45th Guards Spetsnaz Brigade (Kubinka)
  - 31st Guards Air Assault Brigade (Ulyanovsk)
- Kazakhstan
  - 37th Separate Air Assault Brigade (Taldykorgan)
  - Special Operations Battalion of the National Guard of Kazakhstan (Almaty)
- Belarus
  - 103rd Guards Airborne Brigade (Vitebsk)
- Armenia
  - 12th Peacekeeping Brigade (Yerevan)
- Kyrgyzstan
  - Infantry battalion under Scorpion 25th Special Forces Brigade (Tokmok)
- Tajikistan
  - Infantry battalion under Tajik Mobile Forces (Dushanbe)

== Joint Staff ==
The Joint Staff is a permanent working body of the CSTO that is responsible for preparing proposals on the military component of the CSTO, the operations and usage of the CSTO Collective Forces, the preparation of joint operational and combat training activities, military-technical cooperation, coordinating joint training of personnel and specialists for the armed forces of the CSTO member states, as well as organizing the functioning of the CSTO Crisis Response Center.

=== Chiefs of the Joint Staff ===
The Chiefs of the Joint Staff of the CSTO with their concurrent positions in the armed forces:

- Lieutenant General Ramil Nadyrov, Chief of the General Staff of the Armed Forces of Tajikistan (April 2003 – June 2004)
- Lieutenant General Bulat Darbekov, Chairman of the Joint Staff Committee of Kazakhstan (June 2004 – June 2005)
- Army General Yuri Baluyevsky, First Deputy Minister of Defense and Chief of the General Staff of the Armed Forces of the Russian Federation (June 2005 – June 2006)
- Lieutenant General Sergey Gurulev, Chief of the General Staff of the Armed Forces of Belarus (June 2006 – October 2007)
- Major General Boris Yugai, Chief of the General Staff of the Armed Forces of the Kyrgyz Republic (October 2007 – July 2008)
- Colonel General Yuri Khatchaturov, Chief of the General Staff of the Armed Forces of Armenia (September 2008 – December 2010)
- Major General Petr Tihonovsky, Chief of the General Staff of the Armed Forces of Belarus (December 2010 – May 2012)
- Colonel General Saken Zhasuzakov, Chairman of the Joint Staff Committee of Kazakhstan (May 2012 – December 2012)

== Commanders of the KSOR ==
- Major General Mirali Rahmatzoda, Commander of the Mobile Forces of the Armed Forces of the Republic of Tajikistan (May 2015)
