= Chief of the Joint Staff of the Collective Security Treaty Organization =

Chief of the Joint Staff of the CSTO
- Начальник Объединенного штаба Организации Договора о коллективной безопасности (Russian)
- Flag of the Collective Security Treaty Organization

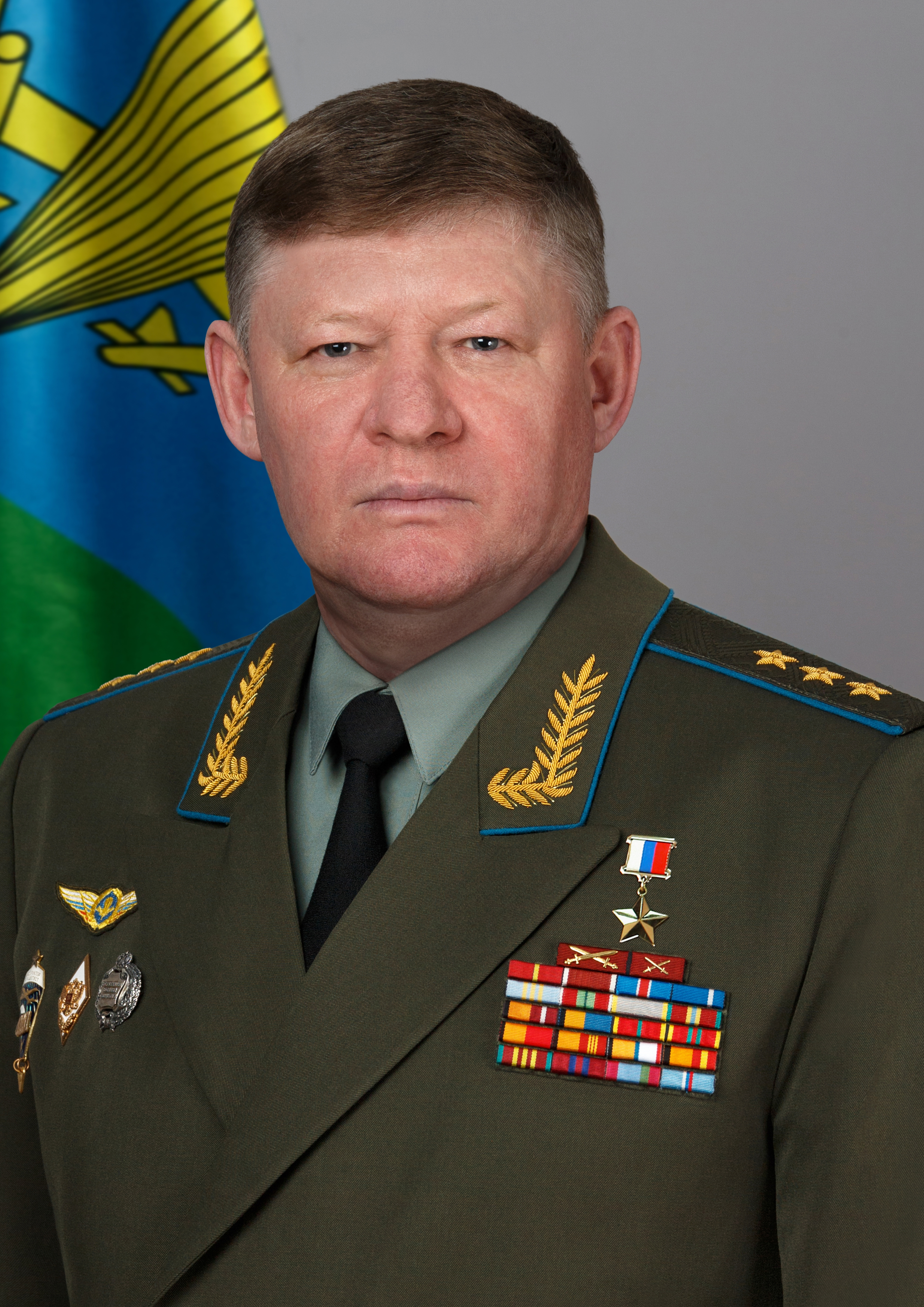
- Incumbent; Colonel General Andrey Serdyukov since November 2023
- Collective Security Treaty Organization
- Reports to: Secretary General of the CSTO
- Seat: Moscow, Russia
- Formation: 28 April 2003
- First holder: Ramil Nadyrov
- Deputy: First deputy chief of the joint staff

The Chief of the Joint Staff (Russian: Начальник Объединенного штаба) is the official responsible for military cooperation of the Collective Security Treaty Organization (CSTO) member states and the operations and training of the Collective Rapid Reaction Force. The position was established in 2003, and until 2012 it was simultaneously held by one of the chiefs of staff of the armed forces of CSTO member states. Since then it has been held by a dedicated officer.

== History ==
The idea for a joint military staff originated at a Collective Security Council meeting of the heads of state of CSTO members in Minsk, Belarus, and codified in the Memorandum on enhancing the effectiveness of the Collective Security Treaty on 24 May 2000. This was further developed during 2001 and 2002. A proposal to create a Joint Staff of the CSTO was approved by the Council of Ministers of Defense on 19 November 2002. The Collective Security Council decided on 28 April 2003, in Dushanbe, Tajikistan, that the Joint Staff would begin to be organized starting from 1 January 2004, in accordance with the Council of Ministers of Defense decision and Article 13 of the Charter of the Collective Security Treaty Organization. The first Chief of the Joint Staff was appointed on 28 April 2003.

== Joint Staff ==
The Joint Staff is a permanent body of the Collective Security Treaty Organization that is tasked with the implementation of decisions by the CSTO for military cooperation, such as the joint training of CSTO forces, and the use of the Collective Rapid Reaction Force, in coordination with the ministries of defense of the member states. It is led by the Chief of the Joint Staff, who is assisted by a first deputy chief, and multiple other deputy chiefs and assistant chiefs. Each of them oversees a section of the Joint Staff, which include the Center for Planning the Implementation and Preparation of the Collective Rapid Reaction Force, the Emergency Response Center, and directorates for technical cooperation, material-technical support, training, medical, and financial services. The Joint Staff is headquartered at the building in Moscow, Russia, that was previously used by the Warsaw Pact and the Staff for Military Cooperation of the CIS Member States.

== List of chiefs ==
No.	Portrait	Name (born–died)	Term of office			Service branch	Ref.
No.	Portrait	Name (born–died)	Took office	Left office	Time in office	Service branch	Ref.
1	Ramil Nadyrov	Lieutenant General; Ramil Nadyrov (born 1967)	28 April 2003	June 2004	1 year, 1 month	Tajik Ground Forces	
2	Bulat Darbekov	Lieutenant General; Bulat Darbekov (born 1957)	June 2004	June 2005	1 year	Kazakh Ground Forces	
3	Yuri Baluyevsky	Army General; Yuri Baluyevsky (born 1947)	June 2005	June 2006	1 year	Russian Ground Forces	
4	Sergey Gurulyov	Lieutenant General; Sergey Gurulyov (born 1953)	June 2006	October 2007	1 year, 4 months	Belarusian Ground Forces	
5	Boris Yugai	Major General; Boris Yugai (1957–2010)	October 2007	July 2008	9 months	Kyrgyz Ground Forces	
6	Yuri Khatchaturov	Colonel General; Yuri Khatchaturov (born 1953)	July 2008	December 2010	2 years, 5 months	Armenian Ground Forces	
7	Pyotr Tikhonovsky	Major General; Pyotr Tikhonovsky (born 1958)	December 2010	May 2012	1 year, 5 months	Belarusian Ground Forces	
8	Saken Zhasuzakov	Colonel General; Saken Zhasuzakov (born 1957)	May 2012	December 2012	7 months	Kazakh Ground Forces	
9	Aleksandr Studenikin	Lieutenant General; Aleksandr Studenikin (born 1955)	December 2012	November 2015	2 years, 11 months	Russian Ground Forces	
10	Anatoly Sidorov	Colonel General; Anatoly Sidorov (born 1955)	November 2015	November 2023	8 years	Russian Ground Forces	
11	Andrey Serdyukov	Colonel General; Andrey Serdyukov (born 1962)	November 2023	Incumbent	2 years, 11 months	Russian Airborne Forces	
