= Bulat Darbekov =

Kazakh military general

- Born: October 10, 1957 (age 69); Tokmok, Kirghiz SSR, Soviet Union
- Education: Frunze Military Academy; Military Academy of the Armed Forces of the Republic of Kazakhstan; General Staff of the Armed Forces of the Russian Federation
- Military career
- Allegiance: Kazakhstan
- Branch: Kazakh Ground Forces
- Service years: 1979–2008
- Rank: Lieutenant general
- Commands: Chief of the Joint Staff of the CSTO; Chief of the General Staff

Bulat Kerimzhanovich Darbekov (born October 21, 1957) is a retired Kazakh general. He served as the First Deputy Minister of Defense and the Chief of the General Staff of the Armed Forces of Kazakhstan from 2003 to 2007. He was also the Chief of the Joint Staff of the Collective Security Treaty Organization from 2004 to 2005.

== Biography ==
Darbekov was born in Tokmok, Kirghiz Soviet Socialist Republic. He obtained his graduation with honors from the Alma-Ata Higher All-Arms Command School in 1979. Before his appointment as commander of airborne assault platoon, the 35th Guards Air Assault Brigade in November 1979, he took his first assignment as a commander of a motorized rifle platoon of the Group of Soviet Forces in Germany.

Between November 1995 to May 1998, he served at various units, including commander of a motorized rifle regiment, military unit #23260 officer, and instructor of the tactics department of the Alma-Ata Higher All-Arms Command School and tactics department of the Military Academy of the Armed Forces of the Republic of Kazakhstan. In May 1998 he was assigned at a tank division of an army corps as a deputy commander.

After he obtained his graduation with honors from the General Staff of the Armed Forces of the Russian Federation in 2001, he was appointed deputy chief of the General Staff of the Armed Forces of the Republic of Kazakhstan for the Operational Planning department.

Before retiring from the armed forces, he served commander of the Regional Command South from April 2007 to November 2008.

Military offices
Preceded by Malik Sarapov	Chief of the General Staff of the Armed Forces of Kazakhstan; 2003–2007	Succeeded by Mukhtar Altynbayev
Preceded by Ramil Nadyrov	Chief of the Joint Staff of the Collective Security Treaty Organization; 2004–2005	Succeeded by Yuri Baluyevsky
Preceded by Bakhtiyar Syzdykov	Commander of Regional Command South; 2007–2008	Succeeded by Alikhan Dhzarbulov
