= Medal "10 years of Astana" =

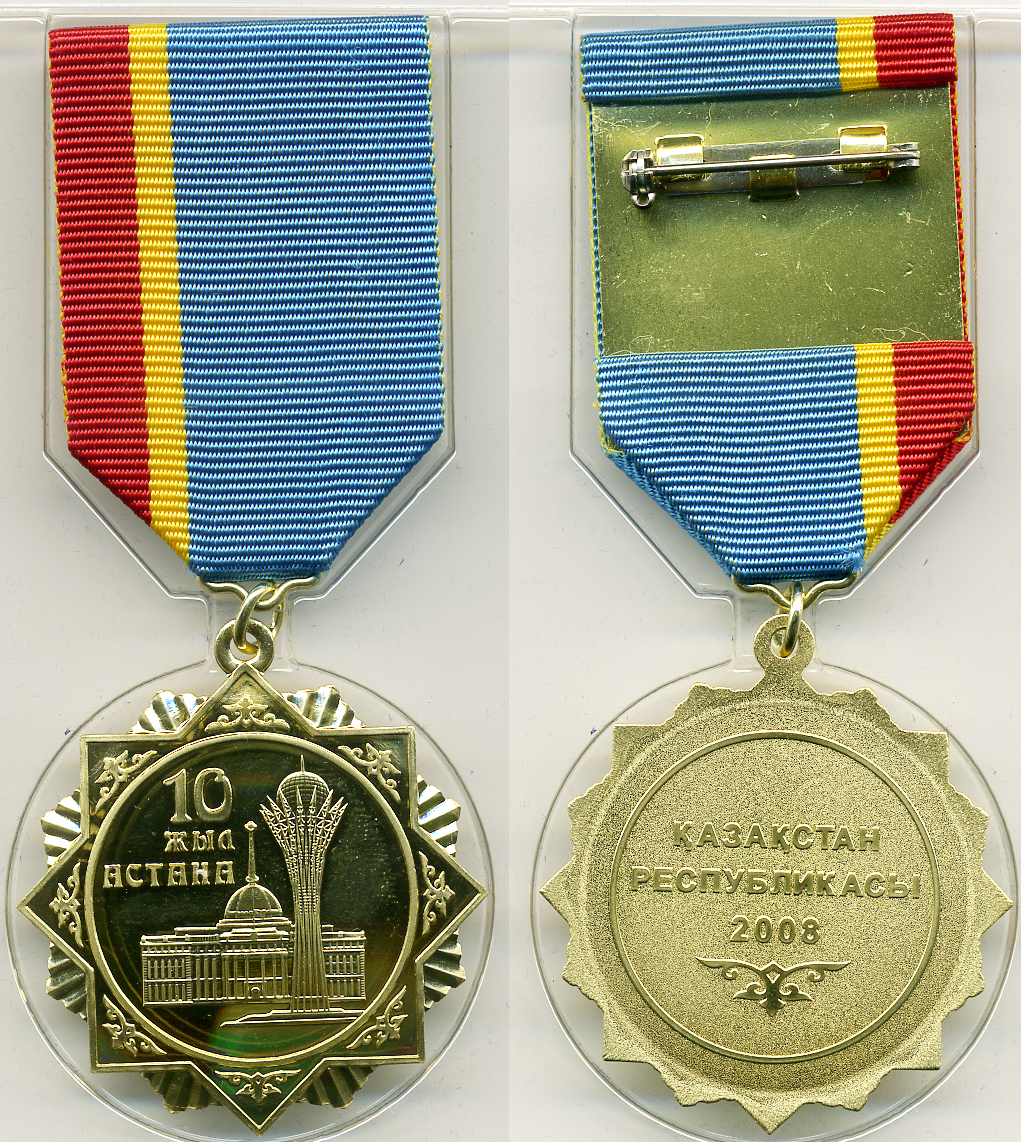
- Type: Award
- Presented by: Kazakhstan
- Eligibility: Kazakh and foreign citizens
- First award: May 6, 2008
- Ribbon bar of the award

The Medal "10 years of Astana" (Kazakh: Астанаға 10 жыл, Astanağa 10 jyl) is a state award of Kazakhstan. It was first introduced on May 6, 2008, in honor of 10 year anniversary of the city of Astana.

== List of Recipients ==
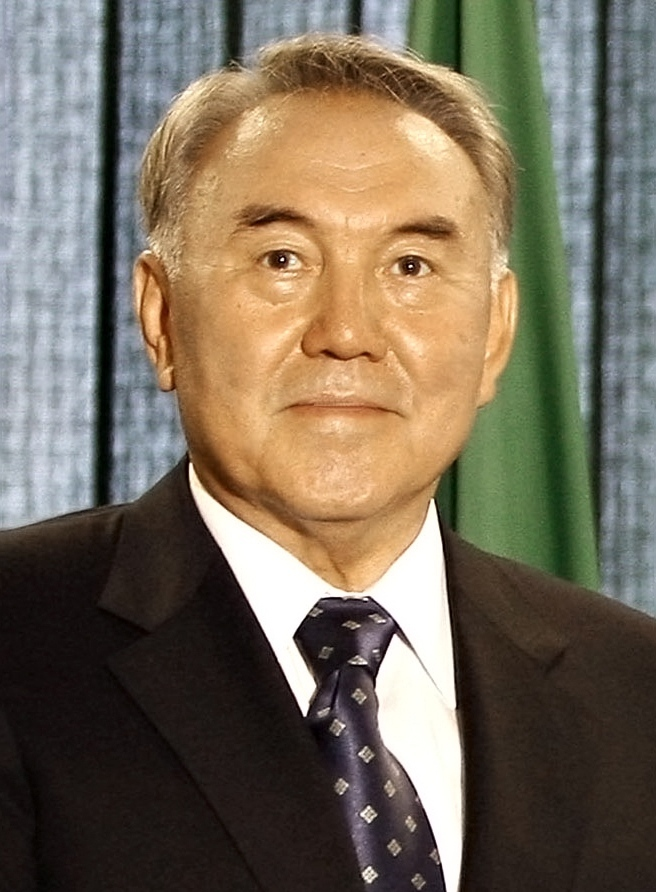
The former President of Kazakhstan Nursultan Nazarbayev, is a recipient of the award.

- Nursultan Nazarbayev - former President of Kazakhstan
- Imangali Tasmagambetov - former Prime Minister of Kazakhstan
- Murat Maikeyev - Kazakh military leader
- Saken Zhasuzakov - Defence Minister of Kazakhstan
- Mukhtar Altynbayev - Kazakh military officer
- Nurlan Nigmatulin - Kazakh politician
- Kassym-Jomart Tokayev- President of Kazakhstan

=== Foreign ===
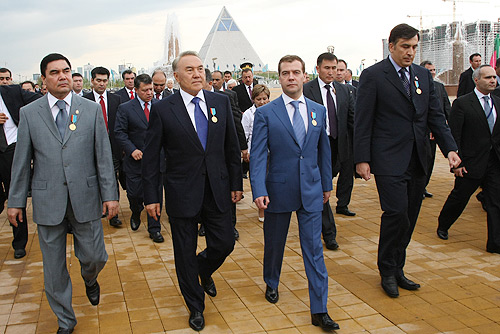
President of Russia Dmitry Medvedev is a recipient of the award

- Abdullah II of Jordan
- Gurbanguly Berdimuhamedow - President of Turkmenistan
- Ilham Aliyev - President of Azerbaijan
- Ramzan Kadyrov - President of Chechnya
- Emomali Rahmon - President of Tajikistan
- Kurmanbek Bakiyev - former President of Kyrgyzstan
- Abdullah Gül - former President of Turkey
- Mikheil Saakashvili - former President of Georgia
- Serzh Sargsyan - former President of Armenia
- Dmitry Medvedev - former President of Russia
