= Alybek Kasimov =

Kazakh general and politician (born 1954)

- Әлібек Қасымов

Minister of Defense of Kazakhstan
- In office 16 October 1995 – 30 October 1996
- President: Nursultan Nazarbayev
- Preceded by: Sagadat Nurmagambetov
- Succeeded by: Mukhtar Altynbayev

Personal details
- Born: September 18, 1954 (age 72) Alma-Ata, Almaty Oblast, Kazakh SSR, Soviet Union
- Education: Alma-Ata Higher Combined Arms Command School

Military service
- Branch/service: Kazakh Ground Forces (1991–2001); Soviet Army (1975–1991)
- Rank: Colonel General

Alybek Khamituly Kasimov (Note: Often transliterated as Alibek Khamidovich Kasymov through a Russified Romanization of Алибек Хамидович Касымов.) (Kazakh: Әлібек Хамитұлы Қасымов; born 18 September 1954) is a Kazakh military officer and politician who served as the Minister of Defense of Kazakhstan from 16 October 1995 – 30 October 1996.

== Early life and career ==
He was born on September 18, 1954, in Alma-Ata. He graduated from the Alma-Ata Higher Combined Arms Command School in 1975 with a commission in the motorized rifle troops (engineer for the operation of tracked and wheeled vehicles). He served first in the Baltic Military District, beginning in Kaliningrad as the commander of a motorized rifle platoon of the 79th Guards Motorized Rifle Regiment, 1st Tank Division, 11th Guards Army. In 1977, he became a company commander in the regiment. From 1981 to 1982, he was Deputy Battalion Commander in the 89th Guards Tank Regiment.

From 1982 to 1985, he was a student of the Frunze Military Academy in Moscow. In 1985–1992, he served in the Transcaucasian Military District, serving as a chief of staff of the training motorized rifle regiment and deputy chief of the Operations Directorate of the headquarters of the ZakVO. From April–June 1992, he was First Deputy Chief of Staff of the 40th Army.

== Kazakh military career ==
He joined the Armed Forces of the Republic of Kazakhstan upon its establishment, and became Chief of the Operations Directorate and Deputy Chief of the General Staff. He was the first Chief of the General Staff, appointed in November 1992 and serving until 16 October 1995. From October 16, 1995, to October 30, 1996, he was Minister of Defense of Kazakhstan. Starting in 1997, he was the military attaché of Kazakhstan in Turkey. From May 2000 to October 2001, he served again as Chief of the General Staff. On October 12, 2001, he was replaced by Malik Sarapov, and was appointed Deputy Secretary of the Security Council of Kazakhstan.

== Honours and awards ==
- Order of Glory, 2nd class (2001)
- Order "For Service to the Homeland in the Armed Forces of the USSR", 3rd degree (1990)
- Medal "For Strengthening Military Cooperation"
- Medal "Veteran of the Armed Forces of the USSR"
- Jubilee Medal "60 Years of the Armed Forces of the USSR"
- Jubilee Medal "70 Years of the Armed Forces of the USSR"
- Medal "For Impeccable Service", 1st degree
- Medal "For Impeccable Service" 2nd degree
- Medal "For Impeccable Service" 3rd degree
