= Aitkurman Omarbekov =

- Kazakh: Айтқұрман Жоламанұлы Омарбеков
- Born: 1 January 1978 (age 48); Kazakh SSR, Soviet Union
- Military career
- Allegiance: Kazakhstan
- Branch: Republican Guard; State Security Service; Armed Forces
- Rank: Major General
- Commands: General Staff of the Armed Forces
- Awards: Order of Valor (Kazakhstan) (2nd and 1st class)

Aitkurman Zholamanovich Omarbekov (Kazakh: Айтқұрман Жоламанұлы Омарбеков, born 1 January 1978) is a Kazakh military officer and Major General who has served as First Deputy Minister of Defense of the Republic of Kazakhstan and Chief of the General Staff of the Armed Forces since 5 October 2026.

== Early life and education ==
Omarbekov was born on 1 January 1978 in the Kazakh Soviet Socialist Republic. He is fluent in Kazakh and Russian.

He holds a degree in the organisation of moral and psychological support from the Military University of the Ministry of Defence of the Russian Federation, and a degree in jurisprudence from the Eurasian Humanities Institute.

== Military career ==
Omarbekov began his military service in 1997 in the Republican Guard of the Republic of Kazakhstan, where he served until 2014. He subsequently served in a range of officer and command positions within the State Security Service of the Republic of Kazakhstan between 2014 and 2022.

In January 2022 he was appointed acting Deputy Head of the State Security Service – Commander of the Special Forces, a post he held until February 2022, when he was confirmed as Deputy Head of the State Security Service – Commander of the Special Forces. He held that position until 5 October 2026.

On 5 October 2026, Omarbekov was appointed First Deputy Minister of Defence of the Republic of Kazakhstan and Chief of the General Staff of the Armed Forces.

== Ranks ==
Omarbekov was conferred the rank of Major General of the State Security Service of the Republic of Kazakhstan on 22 October 2022.

== Awards ==
Omarbekov has received the following state awards:

Orders

- Order of Valor (Kazakhstan), 2nd class
- Order of Valor (Kazakhstan), 1st class (6 May 2026)

Medals

- Medal "For Impeccable Service", 2nd and 3rd class
- Medal "For the Honourable Performance of Duties in Ensuring the Security of the First President", 3rd class
- Medal "25 Years of the State Security Service of the Republic of Kazakhstan"
- Medal "30 Years of Independence of Kazakhstan"

== Personal life ==
Omarbekov is married and has children.

== See also ==
- Chief of the General Staff (Kazakhstan)
