= Anatoly Sidorov =

Russian military officer

- Анатолий Алексеевич Сидоров
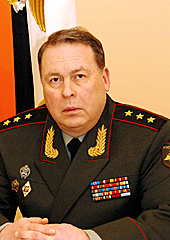
- Born: Anatoly Alekseyevich Sidorov; 2 July 1958 (age 68); Siva, Russian SFSR, Soviet Union
- Military career
- Allegiance: Soviet Union (to 1991); Russia
- Branch: Soviet Army; Russian Ground Forces
- Service years: 1975–2023
- Rank: Colonel general
- Commands: Chief of the Joint Staff of the CSTO; Western Military District; 5th Combined Arms Army
- Conflicts: Soviet-Afghan War; First Chechen War

Anatoly Alekseyevich Sidorov (Russian: Анатолий Алексеевич Сидоров; born 2 July 1958) is a retired Russian Ground Forces colonel general who was Chief of the Joint Staff of the Collective Security Treaty Organization from 2015 to 2023. Before that he commanded the Western Military District between 2012 and 2015.

== Biography ==
Anatoly Sidorov was born in Siva, Perm Oblast on 2 July 1958. In 1975, he graduated from the Sverdlovsk Suvorov Military School. In 1979, he graduated from the Supreme Soviet of the RSFSR Moscow Higher Combined Arms Command School. From 1979 to 1984, he served as commander of a reconnaissance platoon, commander of a reconnaissance company and chief of staff of a battalion in the Odessa Military District.

From October 1984 to December 1986, Sidorov was the chief of staff of a battalion in Afghanistan. As part of the Limited contingent of Soviet troops in Afghanistan, he served as chief of staff of a battalion in the 149th Guards Motor Rifle Czestochowa Regiment of the 201st Motor Rifle Gatchina Division. For the valor shown in the performance of combat missions, he was awarded the Order of the Red Star. From 1986 to 1988, he was the commander of a battalion in the Transcaucasian Military District.

In 1991, Sidorov graduated from the Frunze Military Academy. After graduating from the academy, he served as deputy commander, chief of staff and commander of a motorized rifle regiment, chief of staff of the 469th Guards District Training Center of the Volga-Ural Military District from 1991 to 1998.

=== Further service ===
In 1995, Sidorov took part in the First Chechen War in the Chechen Republic. In 2000, he graduated from the Military Academy of the General Staff of the Armed Forces of Russia, and served in the Far Eastern Military District as commander of a motorized rifle division, and was the deputy commander and chief of staff of the army. On 12 June 2006, was appointed commander of the 5th Combined Arms Army.

Sidorov received the rank of lieutenant general in 2007, with his official appointment to the rank conferred on 26 July 2007 in an event in the Saint George Hall of the Grand Kremlin Palace. In 2008, he was demoted to deputy commander of the district troops. On 22 October 2009, he was the Chief of Staff - 1st Deputy Commander of the Far Eastern Military District. A year later, in connection with the military-administrative reform in the Armed Forces and the abolition of the Far Eastern Military District, Sidorov took up a similar position in the Eastern Military District, which he held until 2012.

At the end of October 2012, Sidorov was appointed chief of staff - 1st deputy commander of the Western Military District, replacing Admiral Nikolai Maksimov in this post. On 9 November 2012, Sidorov was appointed interim commander of the Western Military District, in connection with the appointment of the previous commander, Colonel-General Arkady Bakhin, to the post of 1st Deputy Minister of Defence of Russia.

On 24 December 2012, by decree of the President of Russia, Sidorov was appointed commander of the Western Military District. On 27 December, in the House of Officers of the Western Military District in Saint Petersburg, Sidorov, as the new commander, was presented with the standard of the commander of the troops of the district. He received it from the hands of his predecessor, Bakhin. On 20 February 2013, Sidorov was promoted to Colonel General.

Bellingcat experts had attributed that Sidorov was one of a number of Russians who were responsible for transporting the Buk missile system to the territory of Donbas and for launching the missile that shot down Malaysia Airlines Flight 17 on 17 July 2014.

=== Sanctions ===
He was sanctioned by the UK government in 2014 in relation to the Russo-Ukrainian War.

In September 2015, Sidorov was included in the Ukrainian sanctions list. The same month, the CSTO heads of state unanimously proposed the candidacy of Sidorov for the post of Chief of the Joint Staff of the Collective Security Treaty Organization. By the decree of the President of Russia of 10 November 2015, he was appointed Chief of the CSTO Joint Staff, and took up his duties on 23 November 2015.

== Awards ==
- Order of Merit to the Fatherland, 4th class
- Order of the Red Star

== Family ==
Sidorov is married and has three daughters: Yekaterina, Viktoria, and Anastasia.

Military offices
| Preceded by Oleg Salyukov | Chief of Staff and First Deputy Commander of the Far Eastern Military District; 2009–2010 | District abolished |
| Preceded by Arkady Bakhin | Commander of the Western Military District; 2012–2015 | Succeeded by Andrey Kartapolov |
| Preceded by Alexander Studenikin | Chief of the Joint Staff of the Collective Security Treaty Organization; 2015–2023 | Succeeded by Andrey Serdyukov |
