= Chief of the General Staff (Kazakhstan) =

Professional head of the Kazakhstan Armed Forces

Chief of the General Staff of the Kazakh Armed Forces
- Қазақстан Қарулы Күштері Бас штабының бастығы
- Emblem of the Armed Forces

- Flag of the Armed Forces
- Incumbent; Major General Aitkurman Omarbekov since 5 October 2026
- Ministry of Defense
- Member of: General Staff of the Armed Forces of the Republic of Kazakhstan
- Reports to: Minister of Defense
- Residence: Astana
- Appointer: President of Kazakhstan
- Constituting instrument: Constitution of Kazakhstan
- Precursor: Chief of Staff of the Central Asian Military District
- Formation: November 1992
- First holder: Colonel general Alybek Kasimov
- Unofficial names: Chief of Staff
- Deputy: Chief of Department
- Website: Armed Forces of Kazakhstan

The Chief of the General Staff of the Kazakh Armed Forces (Note: Kazakh: Қазақстан Қарулы Күштері Бас штабының бастығы, romanized: Qazaqstan Qaruly Küşterı Bas ştabynyñ bastyğy; Russian: Начальник Генерального штаба Вооружённых сил Казахстана, romanized: Načaljnik Generaljnogo štaba Vooružjonnyh sil Kazahstana) is the professional head and the highest-ranking officer of the Armed Forces of the Republic of Kazakhstan. The armed forces were established in the summer of 1992 and the position of the chief of the general staff was created in November that same year, two days after the general staff of the national army was established.

== List of Chiefs ==
=== Chief of the General Staff ===
No.	Portrait	Chief of the General Staff	Took office	Left office	Time in office	Ref.
1	Alybek Kasimov	Colonel general Alybek Kasimov (born 1954)	November 1992	16 October 1995	2 years, 11 months	
2	Alikhan Jarbulov [ru]	Major general Alikhan Jarbulov (born 1955)	30 October 1996	14 October 1997	11 months	.
3	Bakhytzhan Ertaev	Lieutenant general Bakhytzhan Ertaev (born 1952)	14 October 1997	7 August 2000	2 years, 9 months	.
4	Alybek Kasimov	Colonel general Alybek Kasimov (born 1954)	May 2000	12 October 2001	1 year, 5 months	
5	Malik Sarapov	Lieutenant general Malik Sarapov (1958–2003)	12 October 2001	May 2003	1 year, 6 months	.

=== Chairmen of the Joint Chiefs of Staff ===
No.	Portrait	Chairman of the Joint Chiefs of Staff	Took office	Left office	Time in office	Ref.
1	Malik Sarapov	Lieutenant general Malik Sarapov (1958–2003)	May 2003	June 2003	1 month	.
2	Bulat Darbekov	Lieutenant general Bulat Darbekov (born 1957)	July 2003	10 January 2007	3 years, 6 months	.
3	Mukhtar Altynbayev	Army general Mukhtar Altynbayev (born 1945)	10 January 2007	11 March 2010	3 years, 2 months	.
4	Saken Zhasuzakov	Colonel general Saken Zhasuzakov (born 1957)	11 March 2010	23 January 2013	2 years, 10 months	

=== Chiefs of the General Staff ===
No.	Portrait	Chief of the General Staff	Took office	Left office	Time in office	Ref.
1	Saken Zhasuzakov	Colonel general Saken Zhasuzakov (born 1957)	23 January 2013	13 September 2016	3 years, 234 days	
2	Murat Maikeyev	Lieutenant general Murat Maikeyev (born 1959)	13 September 2016	5 April 2019	2 years, 204 days	
3	Murat Bektanov	Major general Murat Bektanov (born 1965)	5 April 2019	31 August 2021	2 years, 148 days	
4	Marat Khusainov	Major general Marat Khusainov (born 1967)	6 September 2021	15 January 2024	2 years, 131 days	
5	Sultan Kamaletdinov	Lieutenant general Sultan Kamaletdinov (born 1965)	15 January 2024	17 January 2026	2 years, 2 days	.
6	Kanysh Abubakirov	Lieutenant general Kanysh Abubakirov	17 January 2026	3 October 2026	259 days	.
7	Aitkurman Omarbekov	Major general Aitkurman Omarbekov	5 October 2026		37 days	.

== See also ==
- Armed Forces of the Republic of Kazakhstan
- Ministry of Defense (Kazakhstan)
