= Malik Sarapov =

Kazakh lieutenant general (1958–2003)

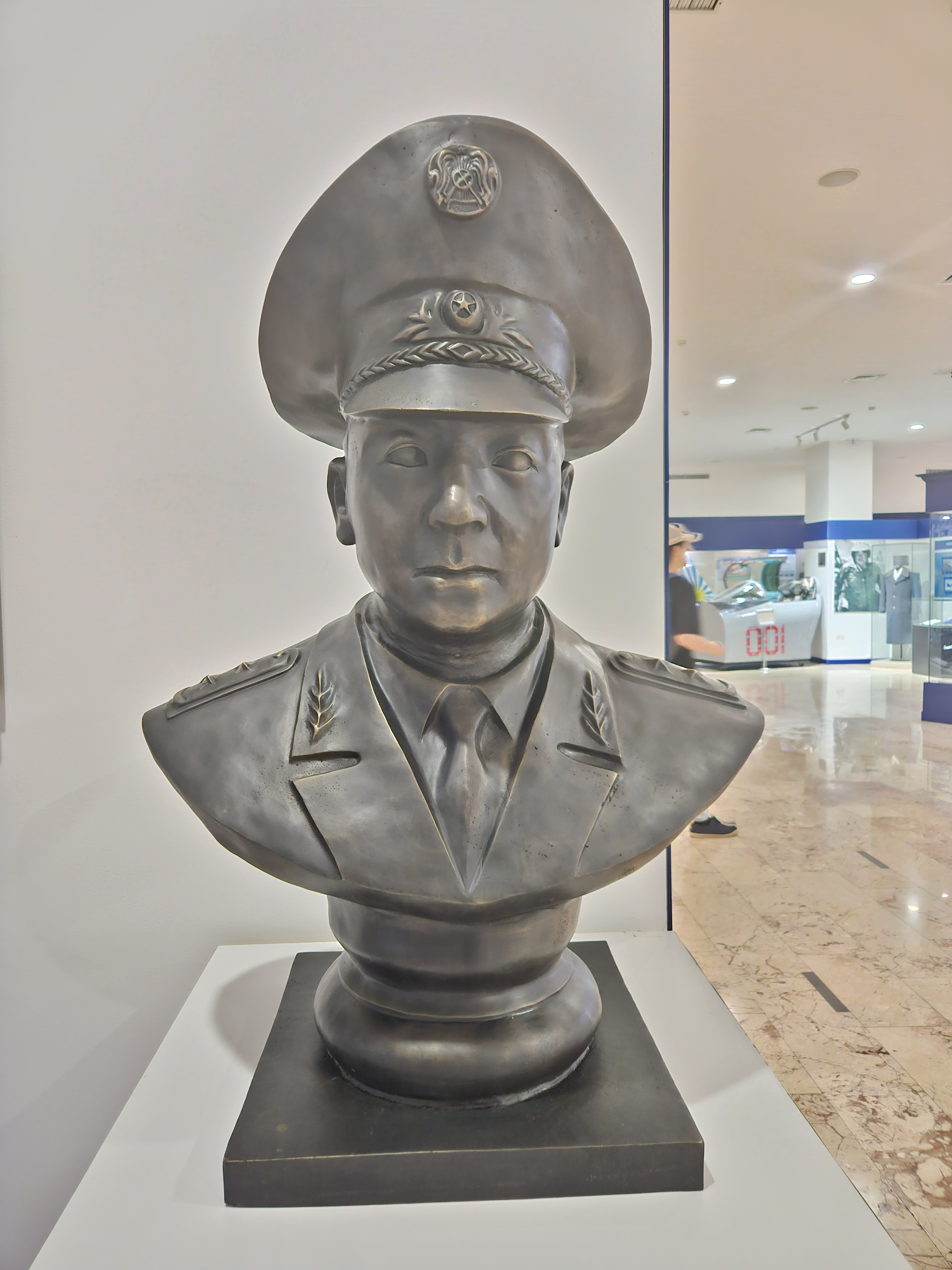
- Born: 15 September 1958; Kyzyltu, Kazakh SSR, Soviet Union
- Died: 19 June 2003 (aged 44); Astana, Kazakhstan
- Military career
- Allegiance: Soviet Union; Kazakhstan
- Branch: Soviet Army; Kazakh Ground Forces
- Service years: 1979–2003
- Rank: Lieutenant general
- Commands: Chief of the General Staff of the Armed Forces

Malik Mukhamedzhanovich Sarapov (Kazakh: Мәлік Мұхамеджанұлы Сарыпов, romanized: Mälık Mūhamedjanūly Sarypov; Russian: Малик Мухамеджанович Сарапов; 15 September 1958 – 19 June 2003) was a Kazakh lieutenant general who served as the Chairmen of the Joint Chiefs of Staff of the Armed Forces of Kazakhstan from 2001 to 2003.

== Military career ==
He was born on 15 September 1958 in the village of Kyzyltu, in the Almaty Region, into the family of a war veteran. In 1975 he graduated from the Sverdlovsk (now Yekaterinburg) Suvorov Military School, and in 1979 from the Alma-Ata Higher Combined Arms Command School. He began his officer career as a platoon commander in a training company in the Transbaikal Military District, where, he also served as a company commander in a motorized rifle regiment. He subsequently served in the Central Group of Forces as a motorized rifle company commander and chief of staff of a motorized rifle battalion.

In 1988, he graduated from the Frunze Military Academy, and upon returning to Kazakhstan, served in the Central Asian Military District (then Turkestan) as the chief of staff and commander of a motorized rifle battalion. He transitioned to the newly formed Armed Forces of the Republic of Kazakhstan following its establishment in 1992, where he originally held the positions of commander of a motorized rifle regiment and senior officer of the operational management department of the General Staff.

In 1997, he graduated from the Military Academy of the General Staff of the Armed Forces. He was Deputy Head of the Department of Operational Planning of the General Staff of the Armed Force and worked for about a year in the Secretariat of the Security Council of the Republic of Kazakhstan. In 1998–1999, he was Chief of Staff of the General Purpose Forces and then Chief of the General Staff/First Deputy Commander of the General Purpose Forces. From December 1999 – October 2001, he was First Deputy Chief of the General Staff.

On 12 October 2001, President Nursultan Nazarbayev issued a presidential decree appointing Sarapov as First Deputy Minister of Defense and Chief of the General Staff, succeeding Lieutenant General Bakhytzhan Yertayev. In May 2003, as part of defense reforms transitioning the top military management toward a joint staff framework, Sarapov was designated as Chairman of the Joint Chiefs of Staff.

== Death ==
Sarapov died on 19 June 2003 while serving in office at the age of 45 from cardiac arrest. Lieutenant General Bulat Darbekov was appointed to succeed him in July 2003.

== Awards ==
- Order of Dank, 2nd degree (May 7, 2001)
