= Mukhtar Altynbayev =

Kazakh general and politician (born 1945)

- Мұхтар Алтынбаев
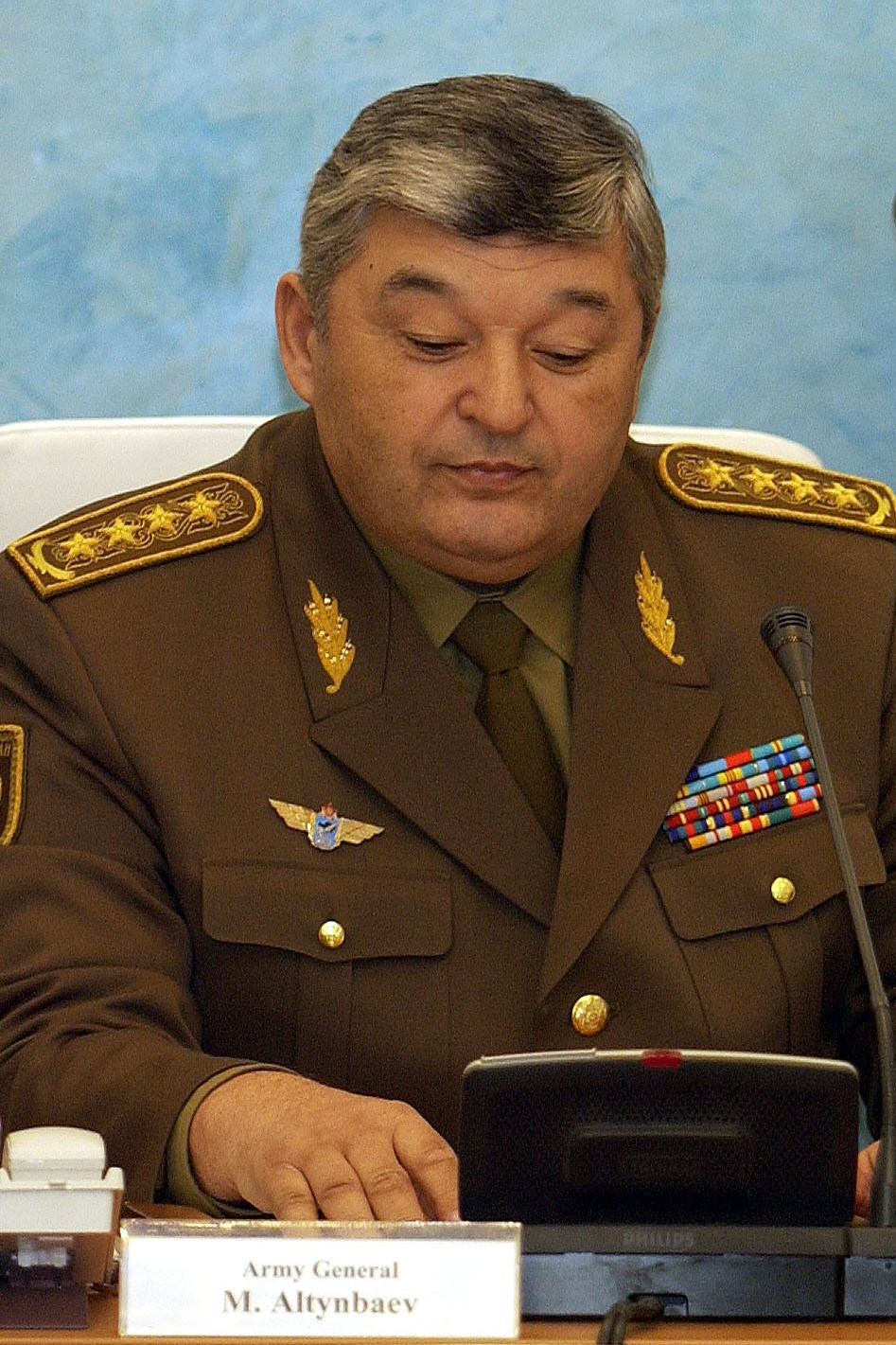
- Altynbayev in 2004

Chief of the General Staff
- In office 10 January 2007 – 11 March 2010
- Preceded by: Bulat Darbekov
- Succeeded by: Saken Zhasuzakov

Minister of Defense of Kazakhstan
- In office 8 December 2001 – 10 January 2007
- President: Nursultan Nazarbayev
- Preceded by: Sat Tokpakbayev
- Succeeded by: Daniyal Akhmetov
- In office 30 October 1996 – 9 August 1999
- President: Nursultan Nazarbayev
- Preceded by: Alybek Kasimov
- Succeeded by: Sat Tokpakbayev

Personal details
- Born: 10 December 1945 (age 80) Karaganda, Karaganda Oblast, Kazakh SSR, Soviet Union
- Party: Nur Otan
- Education: Zhukov Air and Space Defence Academy

Military service
- Branch/service: Kazakh Armed Forces (1991–); Soviet Armed Forces 1969–1991
- Rank: General of the Army
- Commands: Kazakh Air Defense Forces

Mūhtar Qapaşūly Altynbaev (Note: Often transliterated as Mukhtar Kapashevich Altynbayev through a Russified Romanization of Мухтар Капашевич Алтынбаев.) (Kazakh: Мұхтар Қапашұлы Алтынбаев; born 10 December 1945) is a Kazakh military officer and politician who holds the rank of General of the Army. He served as the Minister of Defense of Kazakhstan twice, most recently from December 2001 to 10 January 2007. Prime Minister Karim Massimov replaced him with former Prime Minister Daniyal Akhmetov in a political shakeup.

== Early life and career ==
He was born on 10 December 1945 in the city of Karaganda. His father was the director of the Karaganda Mine #12. He began his labor activity in 1962 as a shaft sinker in Karaganda, having worked until 1969. In 1969 he entered the Armavir Higher Military School of Air Defense Pilots, where he graduated from as a pilot, in the Soviet Air Forces. He later became a commander of a fighter aviation regiment in the city of Perm. In 1982, he became a student of the Zhukov Air and Space Defence Academy, graduating in 1985. After graduating, he was appointed deputy commander of the 24th Air Defense Corps in the city of Mary (in the Turkmen SSR) within the Turkestan Military District. After transforming the corps into the 17th Air Defence Division, he became its commander.

== Kazakh military career ==
From 1992 to 1993, he was the Commander of the Air Defense Corps and Deputy Minister of Defense. in October 1996, he became the Minister of Defense. On 8 December 2001, he was again appointed to the post of Minister of Defense. Kazakh President Nursultan Nazarbayev had dismissed Altynbayev from his post as Defense Minister in August 1999 along with Nurtai Abykayev, the head of the National Security Committee. According to Radio Free Europe, they were dismissed for "failing to properly investigate" the illegal sale of Mikoyan-Gurevich MiG-21 fighter aircraft to North Korea. In March 2000 he became commander of Kazakhstan's Air Defense Force.

=== 2007 political shakeup and subsequent roles ===
President Nazarbayev nominated Karim Massimov, who at the time served as Deputy Prime Minister, to succeed Daniyal Akhmetov as Prime Minister on 9 January 2007. Akhmetov resigned on 8 January without explanation. Analysts attributed Akhmetov's political downfall to the President's criticism of his administrative oversight of the economy. The Parliament confirmed the nomination on 10 January. Massimov appointed Akhmetov to Defense Minister, replacing Altynbayev, and appointed Aslan Musin, formerly the Minister of Economy and Budget, as Deputy Prime Minister. A few days later, he was appointed as the Chief of the General Staff, a position he would serve in until 2010.

== Post-military ==
From April 2010 to July 2017, he was a Deputy of the Senate of Kazakhstan. His son Muslim Mukhtarovich Altynbaev served as the Deputy Defense Minister to Saken Zhasuzakov and Nurlan Yermekbayev from 2017 to 2020.

== Honours and awards ==
=== Kazakhstan ===
- People's Hero of Kazakhstan
- Order Otan
- Order Barys, 2nd class
- Medal "For Meritorious Service" (Kazakhstan), 3rd class
- Astana Medal
- Medal "10th Anniversary of the Armed Forces of the Republic of Kazakhstan"
- Medal "10 years of independence of the Republic of Kazakhstan"
- Medal "10th Anniversary of the Constitution of the Republic of Kazakhstan"
- Medal "10 Years of the Parliament of the Republic of Kazakhstan"
- Medal "50 years of the Baikonur Cosmodrome"
- Medal "For strengthening military cooperation"
- Medal "10 years of Astana"
- Medal "20 years of independence of the Republic of Kazakhstan"

=== Soviet Union ===
- Order for Service to the Homeland in the Armed Forces of the USSR, 3rd class
- Medal "Veteran of the Armed Forces of the USSR"
- Jubilee Medal "60 Years of the Armed Forces of the USSR"
- Jubilee Medal "70 Years of the Armed Forces of the USSR"
- Medal "For Impeccable Service" 1st, 2nd and 3rd classes

=== Russian Federation ===
- Order of Friendship
- Two medals "For strengthening military cooperation"

=== Former USSR ===
==== Kyrgyzstan ====
- Medal "For strengthening military cooperation"
- Medal "10th Anniversary of the Armed Forces of the Kyrgyz Republic"
- Medal "For Distinction in Military Service"

==== Ukraine ====
- Medal "10th Anniversary of the Armed Forces of Ukraine"

==== Moldova ====
- Medal "For strengthening military commonwealth"

=== Other ===
- Order of Peter the Great, 1st class (Academy of Security, Defense and Law Enforcement)
- Honorary Citizen of the City of Karaganda (2005)
- Honorary Citizen of the Karaganda Region (2017)
