= Sat Tokpakbayev =

Kazakh military official and politician (born 1939)

Sät Toqpaqbaev
- Сәт Тоқпақбаев
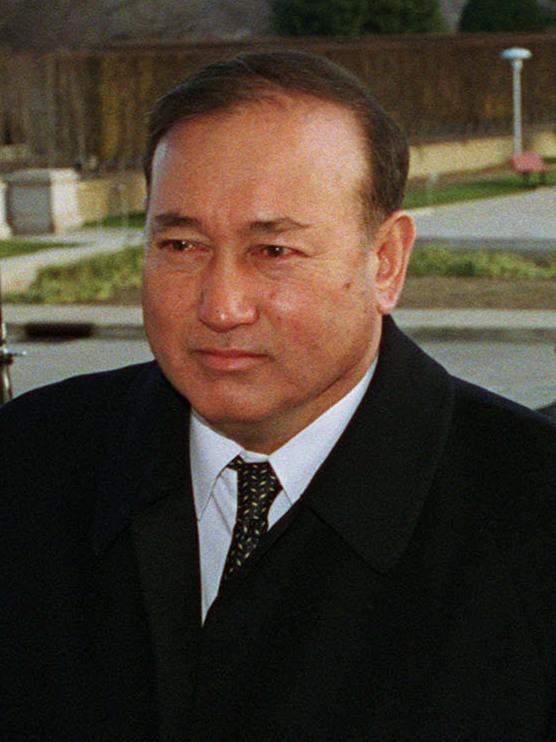
- Toqpaqbaev in 1999

Minister of Defense of Kazakhstan
- In office 13 October 1999 – 8 December 2001
- President: Nursultan Nazarbayev
- Preceded by: Mukhtar Altynbayev
- Succeeded by: Mukhtar Altynbayev

Commander of the Republican Guard
- In office 1995–1999
- Preceded by: Tulegen Umbetbaev
- Succeeded by: Bulat Iskakov

Chairman of the National Security Committee
- In office 27 December 1993 – 8 November 1995
- President: Nursultan Nazarbayev
- Preceded by: Bulat Baekenov
- Succeeded by: Dzhenisbek Dzhumanbekov

Member of the Mäjilis
- In office 2007–2016

Personal details
- Born: 17 September 1939 (age 87) Karaganda, Karaganda Oblast, Kazakh SSR, Soviet Union
- Party: Nur Otan
- Education: Al-Farabi Kazakh National University; Soviet MFA Diplomatic Academy

Military service
- Branch/service: Kazakh Armed Forces (1991–); Soviet Armed Forces 1969–1991
- Rank: Colonel general
- Commands: Republican Guard

Sät Besımbaiūly Toqpaqbaev (Kazakh: Сәт Бесімбайұлы Тоқпақбаев; born 17 September 1939) is a Kazakh military officer and politician. He served as Chairman of the National Security Committee (1993–1995), Commander of the Republican Guard (1995–1999), Minister of Defense (1999–2001), and as a Member of the Mäjilis (2007–2016). He was awarded the title of People's Hero of Kazakhstan in 2024 and holds the rank of Colonel General.

== Biography ==
Toqpaqbaev graduated from the Law Faculty of the Kirov Kazakh State University in 1963 and from the Higher Diplomatic School of the Soviet Ministry of Foreign Affairs in 1971. He is fluent in Chinese and English.

His career began in 1956 as a collective farmer in the Ile District of Alma-Ata Region. After various early roles, he became an investigator at the Alma-Ata regional prosecutor's office in 1963.

In 1964, he completed the Higher Courses School of the KGB in Minsk. He rose through the ranks of the State Security Committee of the USSR, eventually becoming a member of the board of the KGB of the Kazakh SSR.

From November 1991, he served as Head of the KGB Department for Almaty and Almaty Region. He was appointed First Deputy Chairman of the National Security Committee of Kazakhstan in June 1993 and became its Chairman in December 1993.

In November 1995, he was appointed Head of the Security Service of the President of Kazakhstan and Commander of the Republican Guard. He served as Minister of Defense from 1999 to 2001 and was a long-time member of the Security Council of Kazakhstan.

In December 2001, he became an Advisor to the President, Chairman of the Commission on Citizenship Issues, and Chairman of the Commission on Combating Corruption. From September 2002, he served as Chairman of the Board of Directors for the airline OJSC Euro-Asia-Air International.

He was elected as a Deputy of the Majilis of the Parliament of Kazakhstan on September 2, 2007, serving on the Committee on International Affairs, Defense and Security until 2016.

On 16 September 2024, he was awarded the title of People's Hero of Kazakhstan (Halyq Qaharmany), receiving the Gold Star and the Order of "Otan".

== Awards ==
- Hero of Kazakhstan (2024)
- Order of Fatherland (2024)
- Order of Glory, 1st degree (1997)
- Order of the Leopard, 3rd degree (2008)
- Order of the Leopard, 1st degree (2019)
- Winner of the Altyn Adam Festival-Competition ("Military of the Year," 2000, 2001)
- Astana Medal (1998)
- Medal of 10 Years of Independence of Kazakhstan (2001)
- Medal of 10 Years of the Constitution of Kazakhstan (2005)
- Medal of 10 Years of Astana (2008)
- Medal "20 Years of Independence of the Republic of Kazakhstan" (2011)
- Medal "For Contribution to National Security"
- Medal "Veteran of the National Security Committee of the Republic of Kazakhstan"
- 25 medals from the USSR, Kazakhstan, Russian Federation, Tajikistan, and the Kyrgyz Republic
- Honorary Citizen of Almaty (2019)
