= Yuri Baluyevsky =

Russian retired general (born 1947)

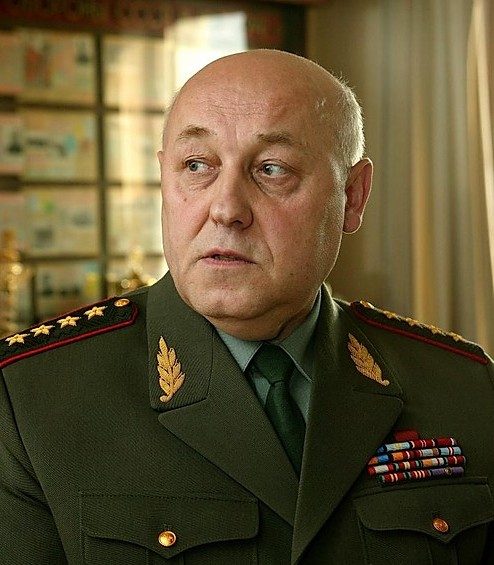
- Baluyevsky in 2006
- Born: Yuri Nikolayevich Baluyevsky; 9 January 1947 (age 79); Truskavets, Lviv Oblast, Ukrainian SSR, Soviet Union
- Alma mater: Leningrad Higher Combined Arms Command School; Frunze Military Academy; Voroshilov General Staff Academy
- Military career
- Allegiance: Soviet Union (to 1991); Russia
- Branch: Soviet Army; Russian Ground Forces
- Service years: 1970–2008
- Rank: General of the Army
- Commands: Chief of the General Staff; Chief of the Joint Staff of the CSTO; Main Operational Directorate
- Conflicts: War in Abkhazia
- Awards: Order of Merit for the Fatherland, Order of Military Merit, Order for Service to the Homeland
- Other work: Member of board of directors at Almaz-Antey

General of the Army Yuri Nikolayevich Baluyevsky (Note: Russian: Юрий Николаевич Балуевский) (born 9 January 1947) is a Russian retired military officer who served as Chief of the General Staff of the Russian Armed Forces and First Deputy Minister of Defense from 2004 to 2008. He was also a deputy secretary of the Security Council of Russia from 2008 to 2012.

Baluyevsky joined the Soviet Army in 1966 and was a platoon and company commander before becoming a staff officer in 1974. He spent the rest of his career in staff positions, serving as an operations staff officer for the 28th Army, the 6th Army, and the Leningrad Military District. In 1982 he was assigned to the Main Operational Directorate of the General Staff and spent the next twenty years working there, and was also chief of staff of the Russian forces in Georgia from 1993 to 1995. He rose through the hierarchy of the directorate, leading it from 1996 to 2001, before becoming First Deputy Chief of the General Staff in 2001, and then Chief of the General Staff in 2004.

During the early presidency of Vladimir Putin he was tasked with conducting high level military negotiations that involved the United States, NATO, and China. Baluyevsky was also Chief of the Joint Staff of the CSTO from 2005 to 2006. As Chief of the Russian General Staff, he favored reorganizing the army into brigades and having the majority of troops be volunteer contract soldiers instead of conscripts. But in 2008 he opposed the efforts of new Defense Minister Anatoly Serdyukov to implement major reforms in the Russian military command structure and their disagreements led to Baluyevsky stepping down. After that he was a member of the Security Council of Russia until 2012, and since 2005 has been on the board of directors of Almaz-Antey.

== Early life and education ==
Yuri Baluyevsky was born on 9 January 1947 in Truskavets, Lviv Oblast, in the Ukrainian Soviet Republic. His grandfather served in the Russo-Japanese War and World War I, and his father served in the Soviet-Finnish War and World War II. In the early postwar years his father was stationed in western Ukraine to fight the Ukrainian nationalist insurgency, which was when Baluyevsky was born. In the 1950s their family moved to the town of Kirillov, Vologda Oblast, in the Russian Soviet Republic. Baluyevsky was interested in military history and read books by Georgy Zhukov. From 1965 to 1966 he briefly worked as a school teacher before joining the Soviet Army.

Baluyevsky studied at the Leningrad Higher Combined Arms Command School starting in 1966 and graduated in 1970. His military education also includes graduating from the Frunze Military Academy in 1980 and the Voroshilov General Staff Academy in 1990.

== Military career ==
From 1970 to 1974 he served a motorized rifle platoon and company commander in a tank division of the 28th Army, in the Belorussian Military District, before becoming a staff officer in the operations department of that army's staff. After 1974 he spent the rest of his career as a staff officer. After serving in Belarus, Baluyevsky was assigned to the Leningrad Military District in the same capacity, first as an operations officer on the 6th Army staff before being the senior officer in the operations directorate of the military district staff.

Baluyevsky served at the Main Operational Directorate of the General Staff from 1982 to 1993. Around the time of the dissolution of the Soviet Union he was as an assistant to the deputy minister of defense, Colonel General Vladislav Achalov, until Achalov was removed for supporting the 1991 coup attempt. In 1993, during the War in Abkhazia, he became the chief of staff and the first deputy commander of the Transcaucasus Group of Forces, working at its headquarters in Tbilisi, Georgia. He served in that position until June 1995, when he became the Deputy Chief of the Main Operational Directorate of the Russian General Staff, and in June 1996 he became the acting Chief of that directorate. In August 1997 he was confirmed in that post. Baluyevsky became the longest serving head of the Main Operational Directorate; Russian military analyst Pavel Felgenhauer described his long career at there as "outstanding" and called him a "capable staff general."

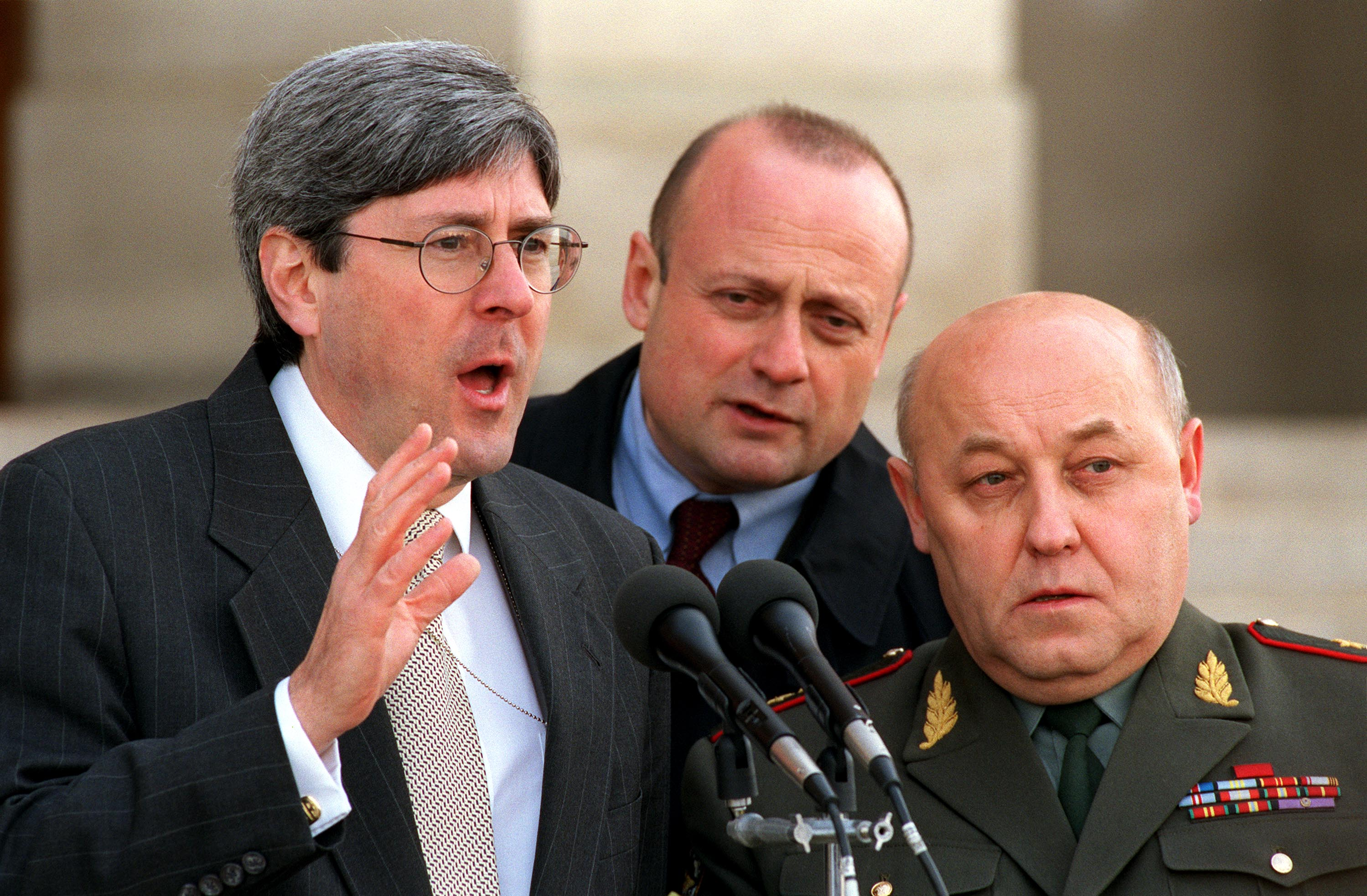
Baluyevsky with U.S. Under Secretary of Defense for Policy Douglas Feith, 2002

He was serving in that position when the Kosovo War started in early 1999 and Russia was going to be excluded by the NATO countries from taking part in the peacekeeping mission there. In May 1999 Baluyevsky ordered the Russian Airborne brigade of the Stabilization Force in Bosnia and Herzegovina to secretly prepare to enter Kosovo. This eventually led to the incident at Pristina airport between Russian and NATO troops in June 1999. In 2000, President Vladimir Putin tasked him with leading military negotiations that involved NATO countries and China. In the General Staff, Baluyevsky was perceived by others as a "Westerner" (he did not see the U.S. and NATO as enemies of Russia), and was later awarded the Legion of Merit by the United States.

On 27 July 2001 Baluyevsky was appointed as the First Deputy Chief of the General Staff by the president of Russia. In January 2002 he traveled to Washington, D.C. and met with U.S. Under Secretary of Defense for Policy Douglas Feith to start negotiations on the reduction of nuclear warheads in the arsenals of both countries, and also to discuss the U.S. decision to withdraw from the Anti-Ballistic Missile Treaty. At a press conference in early 2002 Baluyevsky claimed that Iran has nuclear weapons. He said that "Iran does have nuclear weapons. These are non-strategic nuclear weapons. ... As for the danger of Iran's attack on the United States, the danger is zero." Before and during the invasion of Iraq by the U.S.-led coalition in early 2003, Baluyevsky said that Russia would not become militarily involved in the conflict.

On 27 May 2002 he attended a ceremony for the opening of the NATO Military Liaison Mission in Moscow with the Chair of the NATO Military Committee, Admiral Guido Venturoni. In December 2002 Baluyevsky said that it was in Russia's national interests to have closer relations with the U.S. and NATO, though about a year later in October 2003 he stated that Russia was concerned about the "anti-Russian orientation" of NATO and about changes to its nuclear doctrine. In 2003 he was involved in negotiations between Russia and Georgia. In February 2004 he announced that Russia successfully tested a spacecraft in the process of developing hypersonic weapons.

=== Chief of the General Staff ===
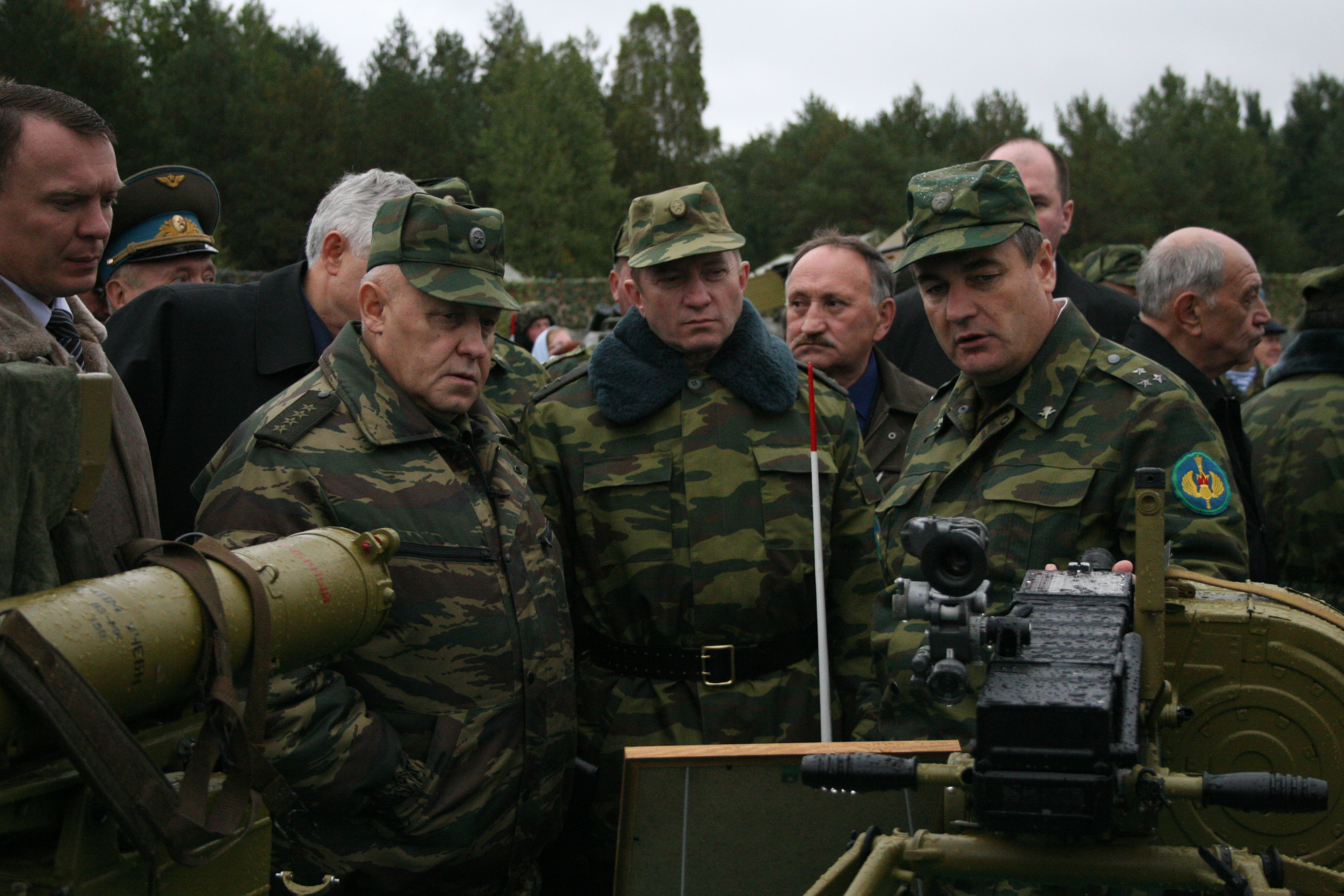
Baluyevsky (left) with the leaders of the Russian Airborne Forces, 2007

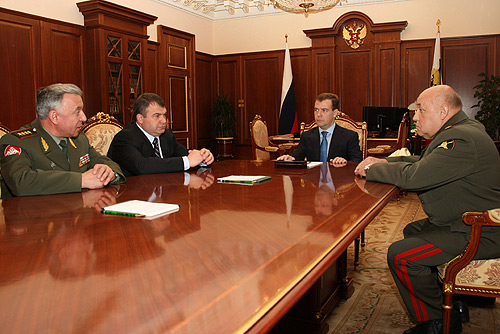
Baluyevsky (right) with President Dmitry Medvedev and his successor as the Chief, Army General Nikolai Makarov, 2008

Baluyevsky was appointed Chief of the General Staff of the Russian Federation on 20 July 2004, being chosen after the controversial tenure of Army General Anatoly Kvashnin. Baluyevsky was considered to be his most likely successor because he was seen as an intellectual and a strategist by others on the General Staff, took part in organizing an administrative reform of the defense bureaucracy that was aligned with the goals of Defense Minister Sergei Ivanov, and led military negotiations with NATO. But he was also the first Chief of the General Staff that did not previously command a military district and did not have much combat experience.

He supported some changes to the structure of the Russian Ground Forces, basing it on brigades instead of divisions and having the majority of its troops be enlisted soldiers instead of conscripts, though he was against ending conscription entirely. However his time as the Chief of the General Staff did not lead to a significant improvement in the military's combat effectiveness. In 2005 he said that the existing Ground Forces structure of army, division, regiment, and battalion was outdated, designed to fight a World War II-style conflict. He said that brigades and divisions should be the main tactical units, and as of that year some "mountain rifle" brigades were being formed in the North Caucasus. Baluyevsky believed that brigades were the right units to have in the Leningrad Military District and divisions were right for the Moscow Military District, based on the geography and terrain of those regions.

Baluyevsky visited the NATO military headquarters in Mons, Belgium in November 2004. He met with the supreme commander, U.S. General James L. Jones, for talks about further cooperation between Russia and NATO as well as the possibility of Russia providing weapons and training to the Iraqi Army. In a 2005 interview, Baluyevsky said he believed that Russia and the NATO countries both have an interest in cooperating to fight terrorism, though they could have disagreement in other areas, because "every state has its own interests." Baluyevsky met with Jones again in April 2006 when he visited Moscow, where they discussed improving the interoperability of Russian and NATO forces. In June 2005 Baluyevsky was made the Chief of the Joint Staff of the Collective Security Treaty Organization and held that position until June 2006.

In August 2005 he oversaw the first large scale joint military exercise between Russia and China, and on that occasion he met with General Liang Guanglie, the Chief of the PLA General Staff Department. Baluyevsky emphasized that the drills are not part of any plans to form a Sino-Russian military alliance and were not directed against any particular country. In December 2005 Baluyevsky visited Cuba and met with Defense Minister Raul Castro, making him the highest ranking Russian official to visit Cuba since 1998.

When the U.S. announced plans to set up a missile shield in Europe in early 2007, Baluyevsky stated that Russia could withdraw from the Intermediate-Range Nuclear Forces Treaty. On 19 January 2008, Baluyevsky warned that Russia was ready to use force, including pre-emptively and with nuclear weapons, to defend itself against the potential threats from "international terrorism or countries seeking global or regional hegemony."

He was considered to become Russia's Minister of Defense in 2007 but was not selected. When Anatoly Serdyukov was given that post and tried to implement radical military reforms, Baluyevsky opposed his efforts, including the relocation of the Navy Headquarters from Moscow to Saint Petersburg and changes to the Ministry of Defense and the General Staff. The conflict between Serdyukov and Baluyevsky became evident in early 2008, when the Chief of the General Staff did not attend the regular meeting of senior American and Russian officials (Baluyevsky and Deputy Foreign Minister Sergey Kislyak had represented Russia at a similar meeting in 2007). His disagreement and open criticism of Serdyukov led to him being replaced on 3 June 2008 with General Nikolai Makarov, who was a supporter of the reforms, in a decision by recently elected president Dmitry Medvedev.

== Civilian career ==
In July 2005 he became a member of the Board of Directors of Almaz-Antey. After leaving the military in June 2008 he became a Deputy Secretary of the Russian Security Council. Two months later, when the Russo-Georgian War broke out, Baluyevsky criticized President Dmitry Medvedev for indecisiveness. He remained on the Security Council until around January 2012, where he continued to oppose Serdyukov's military reform that began in 2008.

Baluyevsky has been a military commentator since the 2022 Russian invasion of Ukraine. In 2024, Baluyevsky and Valerii Zaluzhnyi, then the Commander-in-Chief of the Armed Forces of Ukraine, were noted for publishing separate but similar articles on the impact of drones in the conflict. In 2026 he criticized the conduct of the Russo-Ukrainian war in a speech, asking "when are we going to fight for real?"

== Personal life ==
Baluyevsky is married and has a son and a daughter. He has been a life-long athlete, including in skiing and biathlon, and in Russia he was awarded the title master of sport in skiing. He also enjoys swimming, drawing, and poetry.

== Honours and awards ==
Domestic

- Order of Merit for the Fatherland with swords (2nd, 3rd, and 4th classes)
- Order of Military Merit
- Order for Service to the Homeland in the Armed Forces of the USSR, 3rd class
- Order of Honour

Foreign

- Yugoslavia: Order of the Yugoslav Star, 1st class
- United States: Legion of Merit

Other

- House of Romanov: Order of Saint Anna, 1st class
- House of Romanov: Order of Saint Nicholas the Wonderworker, 1st class

== Citations ==
Military offices
Preceded by Leonty Shevtsov	Deputy Chief of the Main Operational Directorate; 1995–1996	Succeeded by Aleksandr Rukshin
Preceded by Leonid Zolotov	Chief of the Main Operational Directorate; 1996–2001	Succeeded by Aleksandr Rukshin
Preceded by Valery Manilov	First Deputy Chief of the General Staff of the Armed Forces of the Russian Federation; 2001–2004	Succeeded by Aleksandr Burutin
Preceded by Anatoly Kvashnin	Chief of the General Staff of the Armed Forces of the Russian Federation; 2004–2008	Succeeded by Nikolai Makarov
Preceded by Bulat Darbekov	Chief of the Joint Staff of the Collective Security Treaty Organization; 2005–2006	Succeeded by Sergey Gurulyov
