= General Staff of the Armed Forces of the Republic of Kazakhstan =

The General Staff of the Armed Forces of the Republic of Kazakhstan (Kazakh: Қазақстан Республикасының Қарулы күштердің Бас штабы) is the administrative body of senior high-ranking uniformed military leaders of the unified Armed Forces of the Republic of Kazakhstan who advised the President of Kazakhstan (as Supreme Commander-in-Chief), the Government of Kazakhstan, and the Ministry of Defense on important military affairs. It is led by the Chief of the General Staff, who serves as the professional head of the armed forces.

== Duties ==
- Carry out operational-strategic planning.
- Jointly develops military defense plans and the military doctrine of the country along with other state bodies.
- Directs and coordinates the work of the branches of the armed forces, and subordinate departments and directorates.
- Directs the daily activities of the personnel of the Kazakh Armed Forces.
- In wartime, it serves as the Headquarters of the Supreme Commander-in-Chief.

== History ==
On October 25, 1991, the President of the Kazakh SSR Nursultan Nazarbayev ordered the establishment of the State Defense Committee of the Kazakh Soviet Socialist Republic, and after the establishment of the Armed Forces on May 7, 1992, the State Defense Committee was transformed into the Ministry of Defense. Simultaneously, the Main Staff of the Armed Forces was established to manage the military administrative affairs. On November 17, 1997, the President Nazarbayev transformed the Main Staff into the General Staff. On May 7, 2003, it was transformed into the Committee of Chiefs of Staff of the Ministry of Defense, based on the British (Chiefs of Staff Committee) and American (Joint Chiefs of Staff) models of military governance. On October 11, 2011, after the adoption of the fourth military doctrine of Kazakhstan, the committee was reorganized back to the name of the General Staff.

== Structure ==
- Department of Territorial Defense
- Department of Radiation, Chemical, Biological Defense and Environmental Safety Troops
- Department of Strategic Planning
- Department of Educational and Ideological Work
- Department of Organizational and Mobilization Work
