= Yekaterinburg Suvorov Military School =

Russian military academy

- Екатеринбургское суворовское военное училище
- Great emblem of the school
- Other names: EkSVU
- Former names: Oryol Suvorov Military School
- Motto: "Верность Отчизне на все времена"
- Motto in English: "Loyalty to the Motherland for all times"
- Type: military academy
- Established: December 19, 1943
- Founders: Soviet Government
- Affiliations: Armed Forces of Russia
- Academic affiliations: Suvorov Military Schools
- Officer in charge: Colonel Yuri Zatonatsky
- Location: Yekaterinburg, Russia; 56.845°N 60.648°E
- Language: Russian
- Website: http://www.eksvu.ru

The Yekaterinburg Suvorov Military School (Russian: Екатеринбургское суворовское военное училище, ЕкСВУ) is one of the Russian Armed Forces's many Suvorov Military Schools located on the territory of the Russian Federation. This specific school is based in the city of Yekaterinburg. The school is distinguished by its white uniforms that are worn by cadets, unlike the black uniforms worn by the Moscow Suvorov Military School.

== History ==
In August 1943, the Council of People's Commissars of the USSR adopted a resolution which included measures to restore the standard of living in areas that were liberated from German occupation. This resolution provided the basis for the creation of 9 Suvorov military schools in western region of the Soviet Union were formed, including one in Orlovskoye, which was initially stationed in the Region of Oryol, where the Oryol Suvorov Military School was founded. The first head of the school, Major General Alexey Kuzmin, was a key player in the founding of the school. The first set of pupils, specifically 514 students, came from different backgrounds, including teenagers who had served with their adult counterparts as intelligence officers, signalmen, or members of partisan detachments. On December 1, 1943, the first academic year began, with the school receiving the Order of the Red Banner only 2 and a half weeks late. In September 1947, the Oryol Suvorov Military School was transferred to the city of Sverdlovsk and by May 1948, became the Sverdlovsk Suvorov Military School. In 1948, the first graduation of cadets took place.

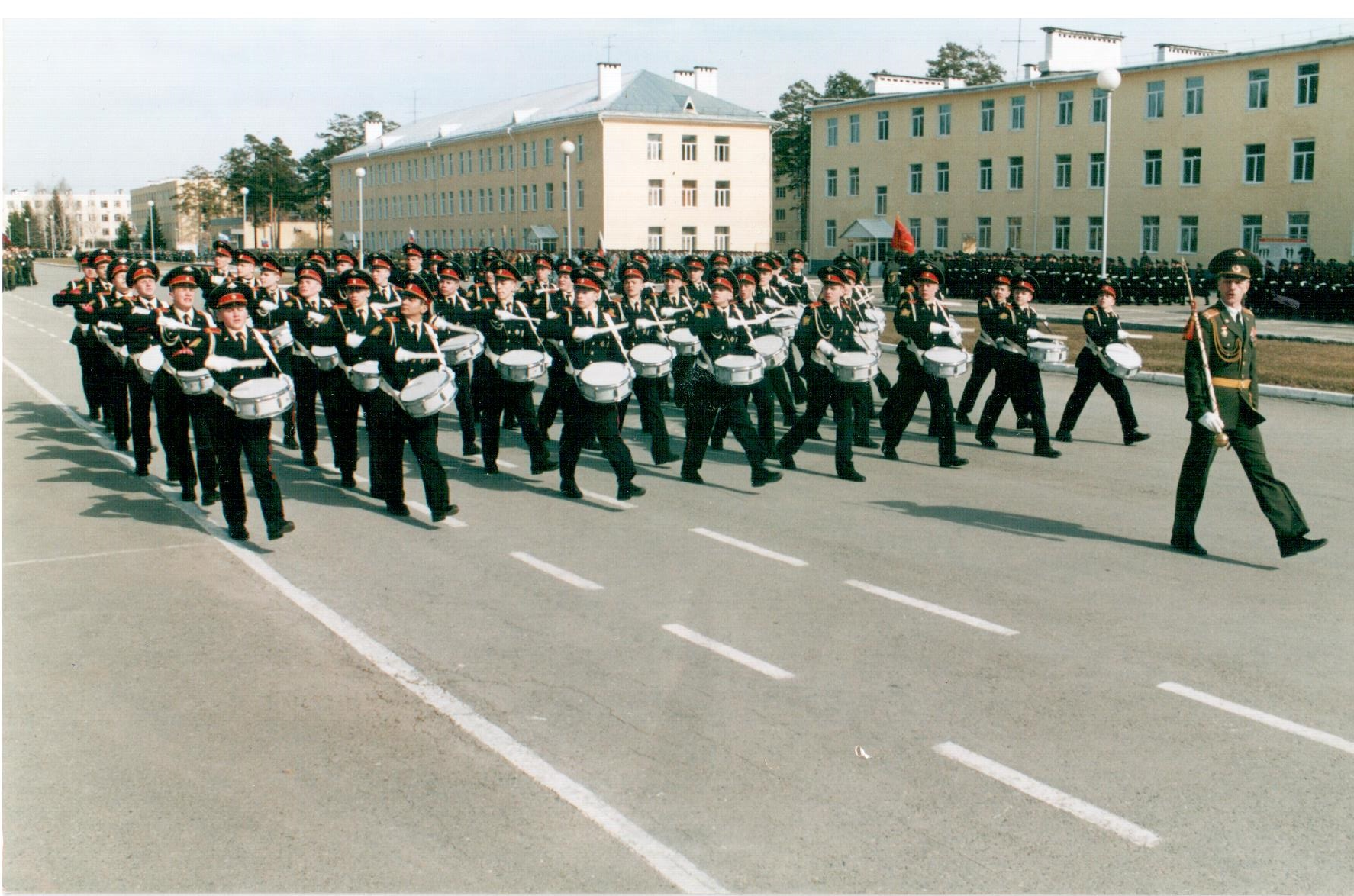
The school's corps of drums, April 28, 2006.

In May 1953, the Sverdlovsk Suvorov Military School was reorganized into the Sverdlovsk Suvorov Officers School, which resulted in the graduation of 100 pupils with the rank of lieutenant the next year. In January 1958, the school was reverted to its former name, and would stay this way until the city's name change in 1991. From then on, the school has been known publicly as the Yekaterinburg Suvorov Military School (EkSVU). 20 years later, the school accepted its first foreign cadets who were from neighboring Mongolia.

== List of Heads ==
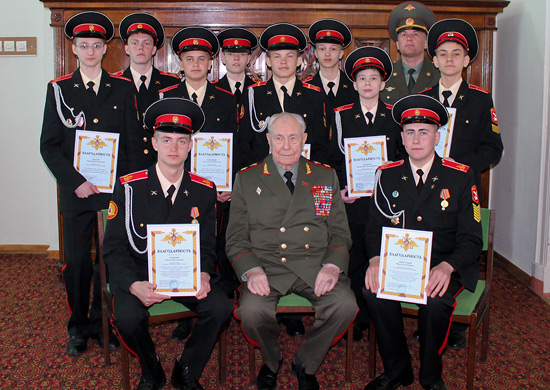
Marshal Dmitry Yazov with cadets of the school in 2014

- Major-General Aleksey Kuzmin (1943–1945)
- Major-General Akim Vyazanichev (1945–1946)
- Major-General Alexander Afanasyev (1946–1948)
- Major-General Mikhail Siyazov (1948–1950)
- Major-General Ivan Dolgov (1950–1954)
- Major-General Georgiy Preobrazhenskiy (1954–1955)
- Major-General Nikolai Semenov (1955–1958)
- Major General Grigory Kobernichenko (1958–1960)
- Major General Ivan Danilovich (1961–1962)
- Major General Mikhail Tikhonchuk (1963–1968)
- Major-General Nikolai Gorbanev (1974–1984)
- Major-General Stepan Smarkin (1968–1973)
- Major-General Grigory Kalinin (1973–1978)
- Major General Grigory Gavyushin (1978–1985)
- Major-General Anatoly Petrov (1985–1999)
- Colonel Vladimir Yavkolev (1999–2007)
- Colonel Yuri Zatonatsky (2017–Present)

== Gallery ==
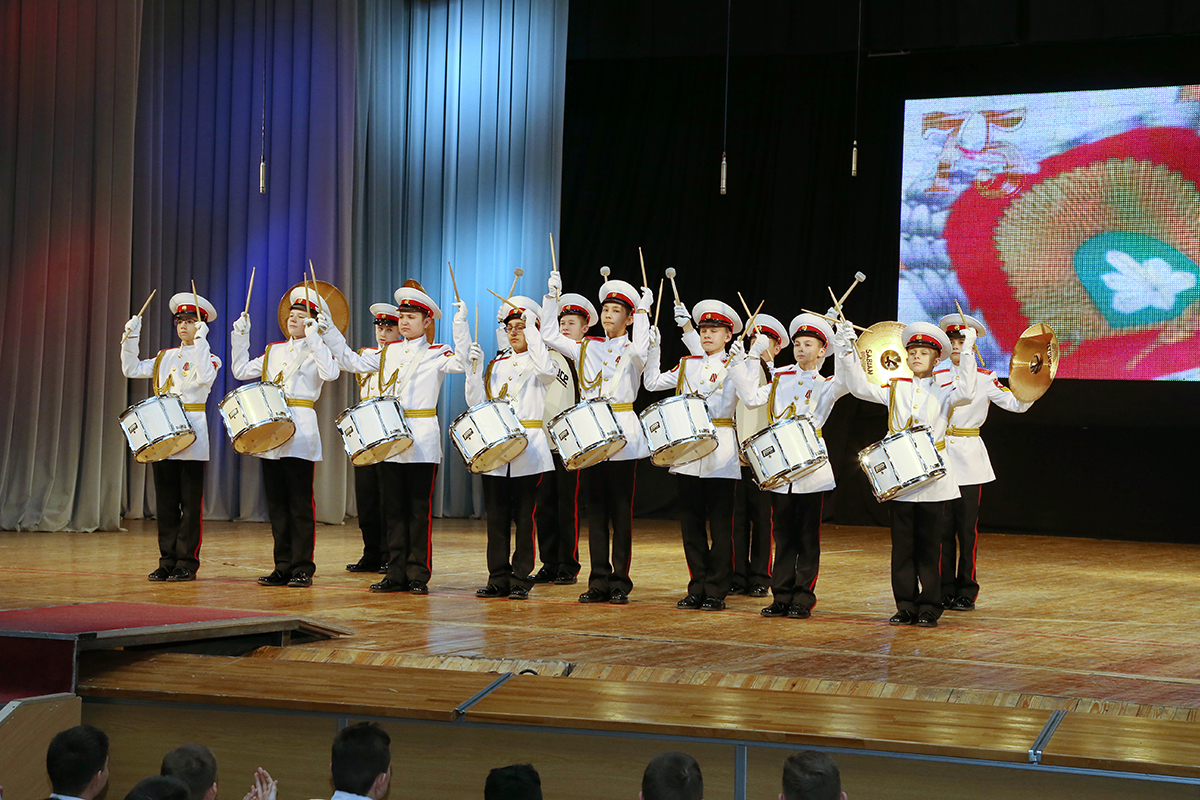
Drummers of the school.

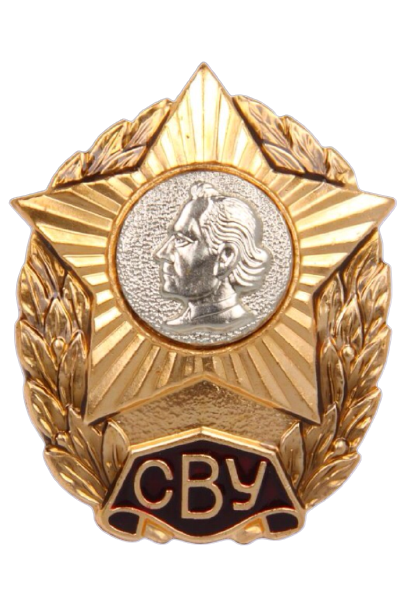
School graduation badge.

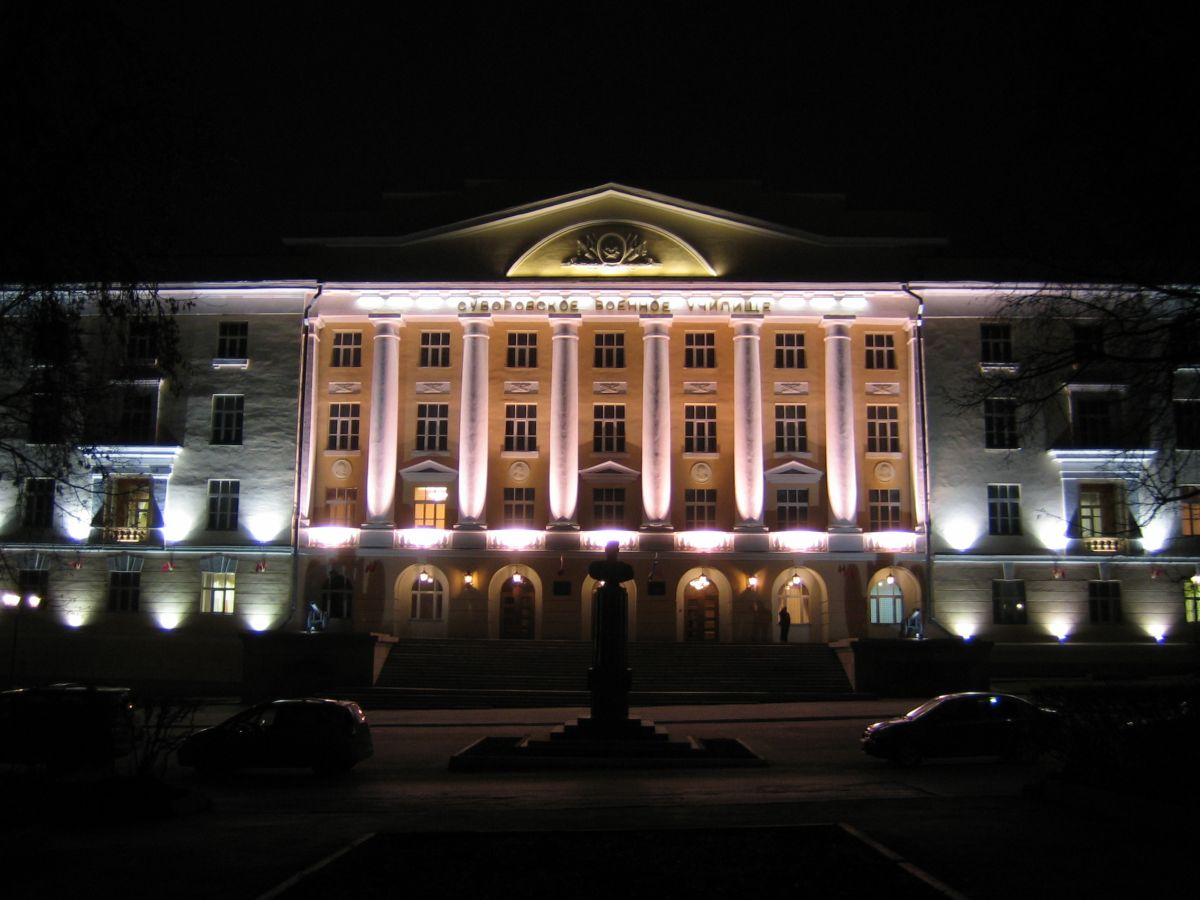
The building at night.

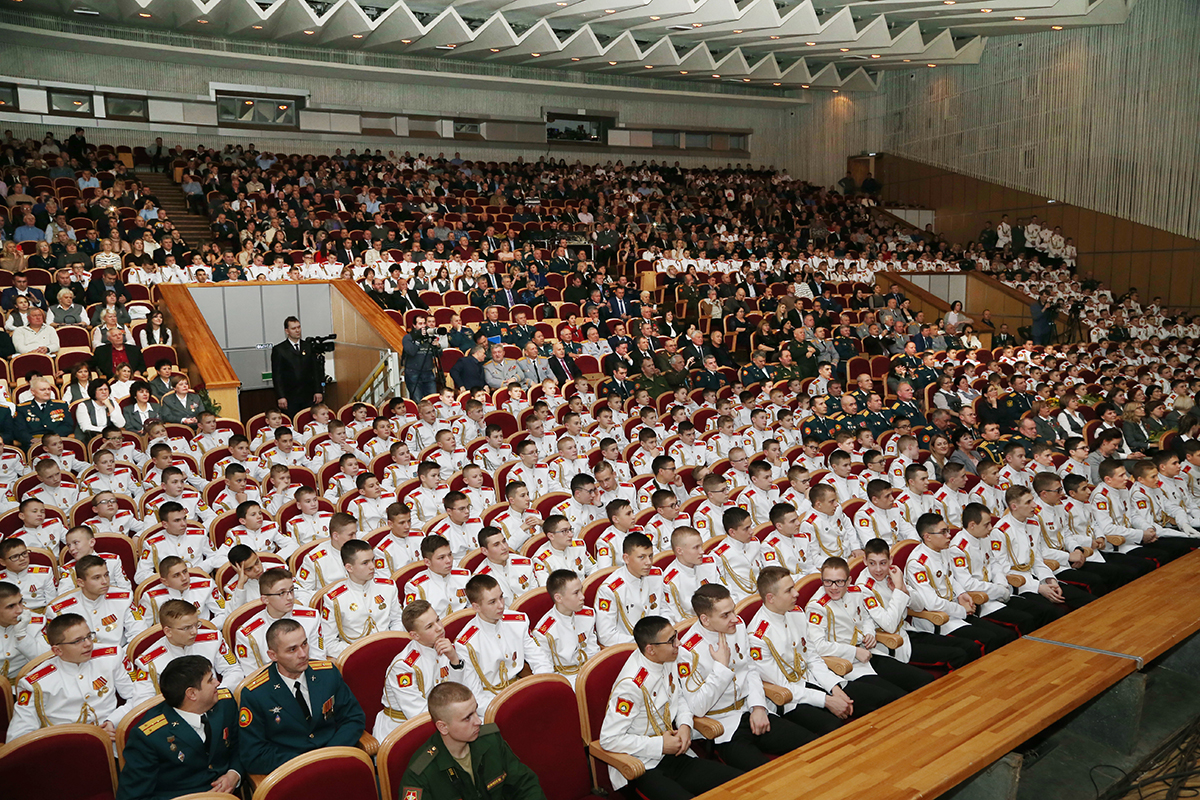
Members of the school assembled in the auditorium on its 75th anniversary.

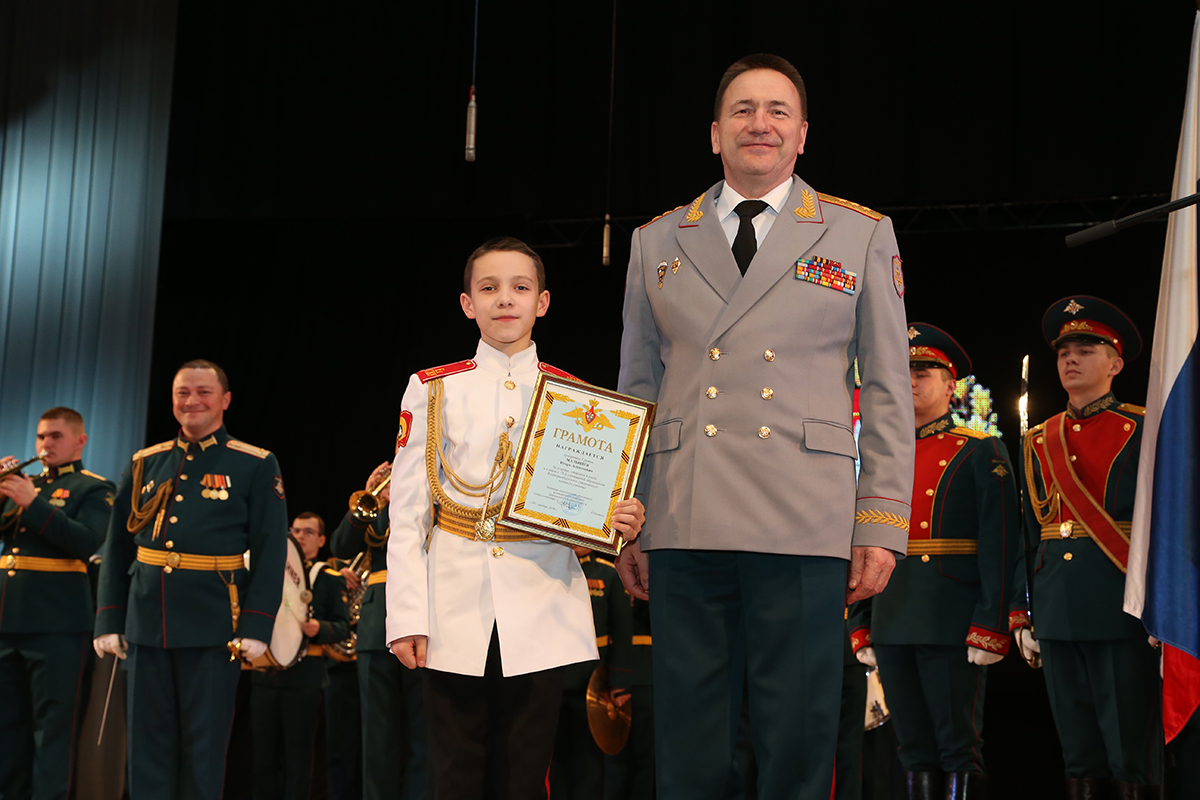
A young male cadet receiving an award from a member of the school staff.

== See also ==
- Armed Forces of Russia
