= Ramil Nadyrov =

Lieutenant General Ramil Khalilovich Nadyrov (Tajik: Рамиль Халилович Надыров, born 24 July 1967) is a Tajik military leader who was the Chief of the General Staff of the Armed Forces of the Republic of Tajikistan from 2002 to 2014. He was also the first Chief of the Joint Staff of the Collective Security Treaty Organization (CSTO) from April 2003 to June 2004.

== Biography ==
He was born on July 24, 1967, in the city of Kurgan-Tube (now called Bokhtar), in what was then the Tajik Soviet Socialist Republic. In 1974, he enrolled in the Kolkhozabad Secondary School and graduated from it with gold medal. In 1988, he graduated from the Chernigov Higher Military Aviation Pilot School after four years, and served in Ukraine in a fighter regiment of the Soviet Air Forces. On 11 May 1992, he was appointed as Senior-Assistant to the Head of Duty Shift of 806th Air Traffic Control. After the collapse of the USSR, he served in the Ministry of Defense of Tajikistan in the positions of senior officer of the Tajik Air Force, chief of operations, and deputy chief of staff of the Air Force. On 24 June 1998, he graduated from the Zhukovsky – Gagarin Air Force Academy (which he was enrolled on 8 September 1995) with a gold medal. He then served as Deputy Chief of the General Staff of the Armed Forces.

He was appointed to the post of Chief of the General Staff on 22 August 2001, serving concurrently as the First Deputy Minister of Defense to Minister Sherali Khayrulloyev. On 1 January 2004, the Joint Headquarters of the CSTO began operating in Moscow on the basis of the Russian General Staff. Major General Nadyrov was appointed Chief of Staff of the CSTO, appointed on April 28, 2003, and taking up duties on 1 January. In 2006, he was again appointed Chief of the General Staff, a position he held up until early 2014, when he was succeeded by Zarif Sharifzoda. Since then, he has been at the disposal of the Human Resources Department of the Ministry of Defense.

== Awards ==
He holds many governmental awards such as the Sharaf Order, as well as 21 medals. Dates of rank:

- Colonel (2002)
- Major General (21 February 2003)
- Lieutenant General (21 February 2006)

== Personal life ==
His wife is Alina Anatolyevna Nadyrova, born in 1974 in Kurgan-Tube. She works at the Second Department of Obstetrics and Gynecology of the Avicenna Tajik State Medical University. They have three daughters: Adeliya Nadyrova (born in 1993), Ameliya Nadyrova (born in 2004) and Illari Nadyrova (born in 2006).
