= Saken Zhasuzakov =

Kazakh politician and colonel general (born 1957)

- Сәкен Жасұзақов
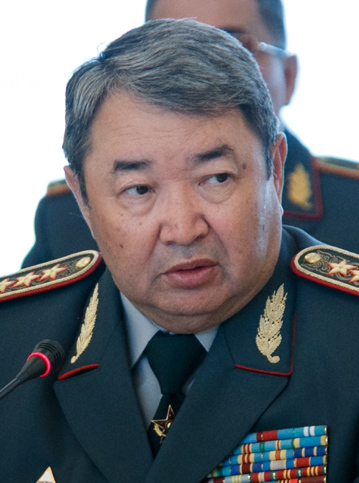
- Zhasuzakov in 2018

Director of the National Defense University
- In office 7 August 2018 – 7 August 2019
- President: Nursultan Nazarbayev
- Succeeded by: Sultan Kamaletdinov

9th Minister of Defense
- In office 13 September 2016 – 7 August 2018
- President: Nursultan Nazarbayev
- Preceded by: Imangali Tasmagambetov
- Succeeded by: Nurlan Ermekbaev

4th Chairman of the Joint Staff Committee
- In office 11 March 2010 – 13 September 2016
- President: Nursultan Nazarbayev
- Preceded by: Mukhtar Altynbayev
- Succeeded by: Murat Maikeyev

Personal details
- Born: 27 October 1957 (age 69) South Kazakhstan Region, Kazakh SSR, Soviet Union

Military service
- Allegiance: USSR; Kazakhstan
- Branch/service: Soviet Army; Kazakh Ground Forces
- Years of service: 1978–2019
- Rank: Colonel General
- Battles/wars: Soviet–Afghan War

Saken Adilkhanuly Zhasuzakov (Kazakh: Сәкен Әділханұлы Жасұзақов, Säken Ädılhanūly Jasūzaqov, [sækʲen ædɘlχɑno̙ɫə ʐɑso̙zɑqəf]; born 27 October 1957) is a Kazakh politician and former Colonel General in the Kazakh Ground Forces. He was Minister of Defense of Kazakhstan from September 2016 until August 2018.

== Biography ==
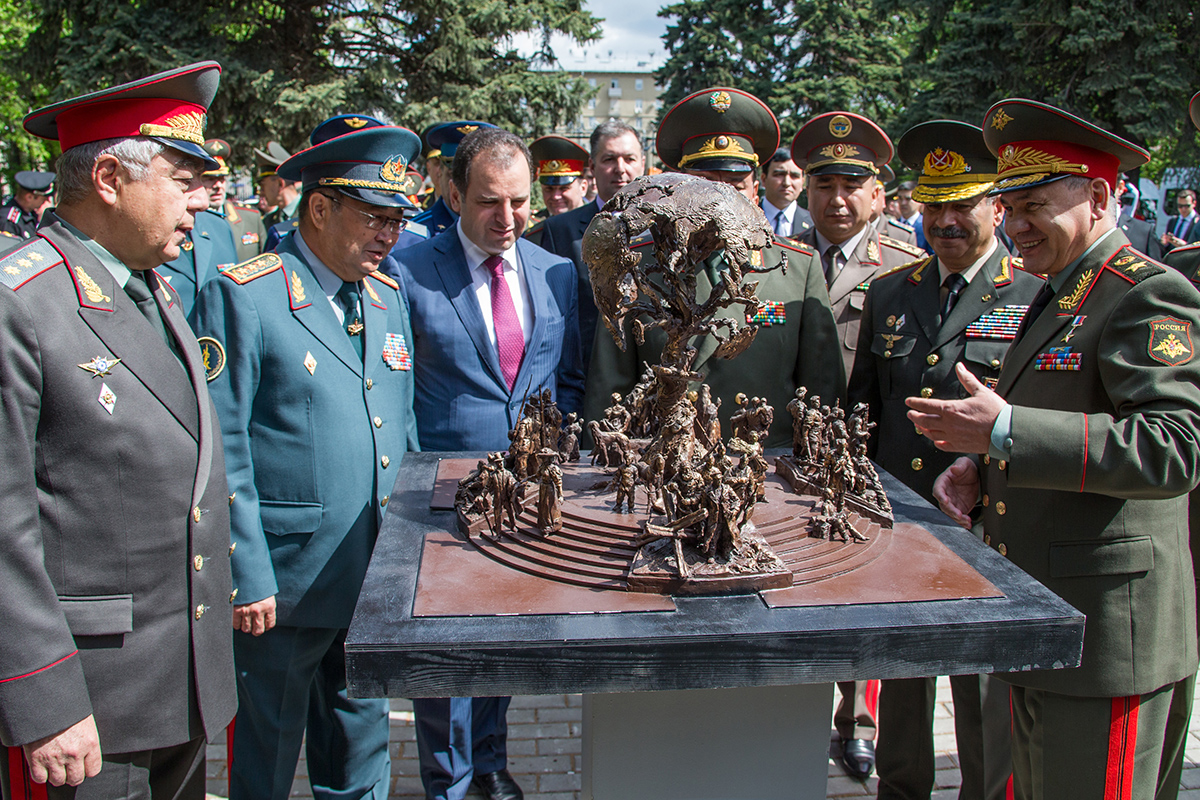
Zhasuzakov (second from left) attending a ceremony organized by the Council of the CIS Defence Ministers.

He was born in Chaldar, a village in Southern Kazakhstan in 1957. In 1978, Zhasuzakov graduated from the Alma-Ata Higher All-Arms Command School. From September 1987 to June 1990 he was a pupil of the M. V. Frunze Military Academy. In July 1994 he moved to Russia to attend the Military Academy of the General Staff of the Russian Armed Forces. In 1996, he was appointed Deputy Chief of Staff of the Armed Forces of Kazakhstan.

In 2003, he became First Deputy Commander of Land Forces, and that same year he became Commander of the Regional Command "East". In April 2009, Zhasuzakov was appointed the Commander-in-Chief of the Ground Forces. From 2013 to 2016, Zhasuzakov was the First Deputy Minister of Defence of Kazakhstan. He was appointed as Minister of Defense of Kazakhstan by Presidential Decree on 13 September 2016.

He was replaced as defense minister on 7 August 2018 by Nurlan Ermekbaev. He currently heads the National Defence University in Astana. Exactly a year later, he retired from the military.

== Awards ==
=== USSR ===
- Order "For Service to the Homeland in the Armed Forces of the USSR" 3rd degree (1989)
- Jubilee Medal "70 Years of the Armed Forces of the USSR"
- Medal "For Impeccable Service" 2nd and 3rd Degree
- Breastplate "Soldiers-Internationalists"

=== Kazakhstan ===
- Order of Dunk 1st Degree (2012)
- Order of Dunk 2nd Degree (2001)
- Medal "10 Years of Independence of the Republic of Kazakhstan"
- Medal "10 Years of the Armed Forces of the Republic of Kazakhstan"
- Medal "10 Years of the Constitution of Kazakhstan"
- Medal "10 years of Astana"
- Medal "20 Years of Independence of the Republic of Kazakhstan"
- Medal "20 Years of the Armed Forces of the Republic of Kazakhstan"
- Medal "For Impeccable Service" 2nd and 3rd Degree
- Medal "For Strengthening Military Cooperation"
- Medal "20 Years of Public Prosecutor of the Republic of Kazakhstan"
- Jubilee Medal "20 years of Internal Troops of Kazakhstan"

=== Foreign ===
- (Russia) Medal of Zhukov
- Medal "60th Anniversary of the liberation of Belarus from Nazi invaders"
- (Kyrgyzstan) Medal "For Distinction in Military Service"
- Jubilee Medal "60 years of Ukraine's liberation from Nazi invaders"
- Medal "50th Anniversary of the Mongolian People's Republic"
- (Mongolian People's Republic) Medal "Military Cooperation"
- Medal "5 years of the Armed Forces of the Republic of Tajikistan"
- Medal "15 Years of the Armed Forces of the Republic of Tajikistan"

== See also ==
- Chief of the General Staff (Kazakhstan)
