= Ministry of Defense (Kazakhstan) =

Government ministry of Kazakhstan

Ministry of Defense of the Republic of Kazakhstan
- Қазақстан Республикасы Қорғаныс министрлігі (Kazakh); Министерство обороны Республики Казахстан (Russian)
- The flag of the Minister of Defense of Kazakhstan.

- The headquarters of the ministry.

Defense Ministry overview
- Formed: May 1992
- Preceding Defense Ministry: State Committee of Defense of the Kazakh SSR
- Jurisdiction: Government of Kazakhstan
- Headquarters: 14 Dostyq Street, Astana, Kazakhstan
- Minister responsible: Aidos Myrzakhmetov, Minister of Defense
- Defense Ministry executive: Aitkurman Omarbekov, Chief of the General Staff
- Website: Official website

The Ministry of Defense of the Republic of Kazakhstan (MD RK, Kazakh: Қазақстан Республикасы Қорғаныс министрлігі, romanized: Qazaqstan Respublikasy Qorğanys ministrlıgı, ҚР ҚМ; Russian: Министерство обороны Республики Казахстан, МО РК) is a government agency of Kazakhstan which is the main executive body in implementing military policy. The Defense Minister of the Republic of Kazakhstan is the head of the Ministry of Defense, whose duties are to exercise the administrative leadership of the Armed Forces of the Republic of Kazakhstan.

The ministry was first established in May 1992 following the dissolution of the Soviet Union. The first Minister of Defense was Army General Sagadat Nurmagambetov who served from 1992 to 1995.

== Functions ==
The Ministry of Defense conducts the following tasks:

- Implements the state defense policy, military-political and military-economic management of the Armed Forces of the Republic of Kazakhstan
- Acts as the headquarters of the armed forces
- Carries out its activities in accordance with the Constitution of the Republic of Kazakhstan
- Serves as a legal entity in the organizational and legal form of a state institution
- Makes decisions drawn up by orders and directives of the Minister of Defense and Kazakh Government

== General Staff ==
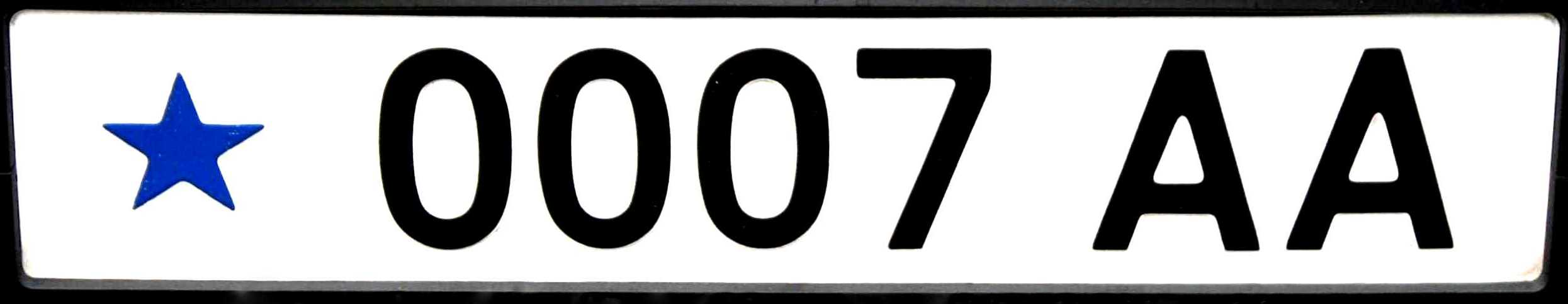
The license plate of a military car belonging to the defense ministry.

The General Staff of the Armed Forces of the Republic of Kazakhstan is the main body for the management of the armed forces of the state in peacetime and wartime, coordinates the development of plans for the construction and development of the Armed Forces, other troops and military formations, their operational, combat and mobilization training, organizes and carries out strategic planning application and interaction of the Armed Forces, other troops and military formations, and also develops a plan for the operational equipment of the country's territory in defense.

== Organizational structure ==
Minister of Defence has 6 deputies, which are:

- Chief of the General Staff - First Deputy Minister of Defence, Major General of the State Security Service Aitkurman Omarbekov
- Deputy Minister of Defence for Educational and Ideological Work, Major General Askar Mustabekov
- Deputy Minister of Defence for Weapons and Military Equipment, Major General Shaikh-Hasan Zhazykbaev
- Commander-in-Chief of the Air Defence Forces - Deputy Minister of Defence, Major General Kairat Sadykov
- Deputy Minister of Defence for Economics and Finance, Tatyana Mikhailovna
- Deputy Minister of Defence, Daulet Bekmanov

=== Organizational structure as of 2026 ===
As of 2026, the Ministry of Defence consists of the following structural units along with their Chiefs:

- Personnel Department - Colonel Meirbek Nurbaev
- Educational and Ideological Work Department - Colonel Tleukhan Baskhozhaev
- Military Education and Science Department - Colonel Murat Olzhabaev
- International Cooperation Department - Colonel Olzhas Khusainov
- Information and Communications Department - Gani Zhapishov
- Pension Provision Centre - Colonel Almaz Koralasov
- Governmental Defence Order Committee - Ruslan Zhumabaev
- Public Procurement Centre - N/A

=== Organizational structure as of 2020 ===
- General Directorate of Physical Training
- General Directorate of Informatization and Telecommunications
- General Directorate of Public Procurement
- Central Archive of the Ministry of Defense
- Office of the Commander-in-Chief of the Ground Forces
- Management of the commanders of troops and combat arms
- Central Command Post
- Arms Reduction Control Center
- Center for Metrological Support
- Pension Center
- Central Army Sports Club
- Center for Military Space Programs
- Center for Military Representatives
- Administrative Department
- Department of International Cooperation
- Department of Combat Training
- Department of Economics and Finance
- Department of Personnel and Military Education
- Department of Organizational and Mobilization work
- Department of Information and Communication
- Department of Planning and cooperation
- Department of Educational and Ideological Work
- Legal Department
- Department of Military-Technical Policy
- Department of Military Science and Innovation
- Main Financial Inspectorate
- Main Inspectorate
- General Directorate of Safety Oversight
- General Directorate of the Cantonment of Troops
- General Directorate of Communications
- General Directorate of Special Forces
- General Directorate of Territorial Defense
- Main Directorate of the Military Police
- General Directorate for the Protection of State Secrets and Information Security
- Main Military Medical Directorate
- Military Police
- Office of the Commander-in-Chief of the Air Defense Forces
- Office of the Chief of Logistics and Arms
- Office for work with sergeants
- Office of the Commander-in-Chief of the Navy
- Aviation Training Center
- Kazakhstan GIS Center
- Kazspetsexport
- Honor Guard Company of the Ministry of Defense of Kazakhstan
- Central Military Band of the Ministry of Defense of Kazakhstan
- Cadet Corps

=== Directorates ===
During the formation of the structure of the Ministry of Defence of the Republic of Kazakhstan in November 1992, along with other departments, directorates, and services.

==== Directorate of Engineering Troops ====
Colonel Marat Gareev, the former head of engineering in the former Soviet 40th Army, was appointed as the first commander of the military engineers in Kazakhstan. Its officers were staffed by those who had previously served in the Directorate of Engineering Troops of the Central Asian Military District. In 1993, there were 12 Soviet engineering units in Kazakhstan, and it became necessary to reorganise these units. In 1995, in Kapshagay, owing to the reduction of three engineering units, an engineer regiment was formed, and for its performance in 2003, it was the first in the history of the Armed Forces to be awarded the pennant of the Minister of Defence 'For Courage and Military Prowess'. Similar regiments were formed in the Southern and Eastern Regional Commands. Owing to the outflow of cadres from the country, the Faculty of Engineering Troops was established at the Almaty Higher Combined Arms Command School, and since 1997, all military engineers have graduated from there.

=== Units ===
==== Military Police ====
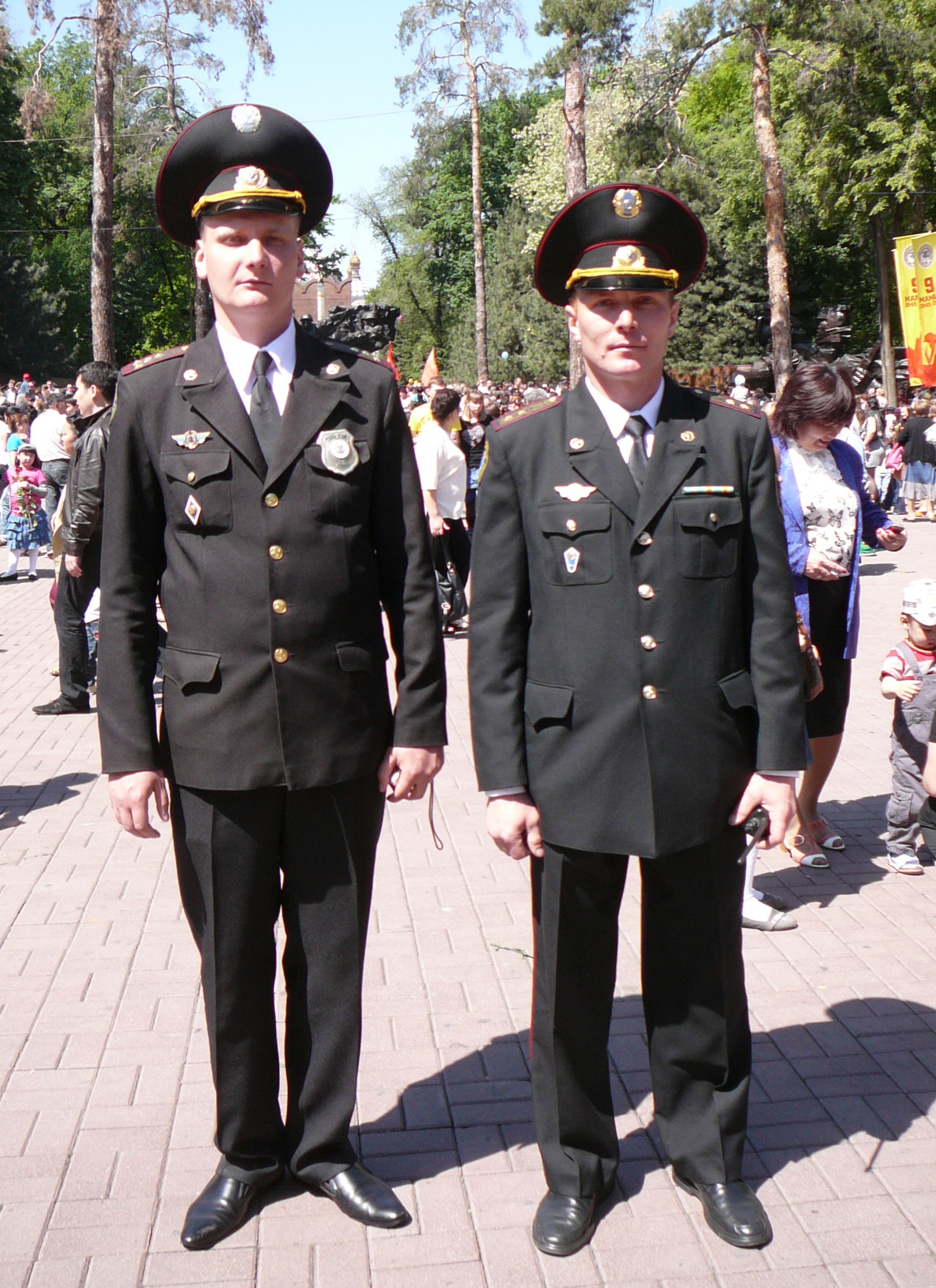
Officers of the military police of Kazakhstan in black casual uniforms.

The Military Police of the Armed Forces of Kazakhstan (Kazakh: Әскери полициясы, Russian: Военная полиция) is the military police branch of the Ministry of Defence. It consists of special military units that are organisationally part of the armed forces, as well as other security agencies, to ensure the enforcement of law and order.

==== Honour guard and band ====
The honour guard company and band are the main military units subordinate to the ministry and are among the senior ceremonial units in the country. The company is officially part of the 36th Air Assault Brigade of the Kazakh Airmobile Forces and is composed of personnel from the Ground Forces, Navy, and Air Force. Colonel Alexander Belyakov (Russian: Александр Викторович Беляков) was the original director of the band in November 1995, after he was commissioned to lead the massed bands by General Nurmagambetov in the Victory Day Parade on Almaty's Republic Square that May. In 2012, the band was relocated from Almaty to the capital, Astana.

==== Cadet Corps ====
The Cadet Corps of the Ministry of Defence of Kazakhstan named after Shoqan Walikhanov (Russian: Кадетский корпус Министерства обороны Республики Казахстан имени Чокана Валиханова), or the Shchuchinskiy Cadet Corps, is an institution of the ministry that was formed on 1 July 1996 as a secondary school that prepared Kazakh youth for service in the military and for leadership as junior army, navy, and air force commanders. A similar task is performed today by the Astana Zhas Ulan Republican School. A month after its formation, the corps had 96 enlisted cadets, most of whom came from the Alma-Ata Higher All-Arms Command School (now the Military Institute of the Kazakh Ground Forces). On its first graduation day, 29 July 1999, when eleven cadets graduated from the corps and enrolled in higher educational institutions, the corps received its own battle flag from the then head of the corps, Colonel Kuangaliev, and Defence Minister Mukhtar Altynbayev. The corps is currently based in the city of Shchuchinsk in the Akmola Region.

=== Organizations ===
==== Sarbazy Gazette ====
The Central Press Service of the Ministry of Defence operates the Sarbazy (Warrior) Gazette. It was created along with the Qysl әsker military newspaper of the Kazakh Military Commissariat. It appeared once a week in the Latin script of the Kazakh language. On 1 November 1969, a newspaper called The Battle Banner began to appear in Alma-Ata. Since each district at that time had its own printed organ, the Central Asian Military District had direct control over the newspaper. In May 1989, the publication was discontinued due to the abolition of the district, and the editorial office was disbanded. Between 1989 and 1992, the Armed Forces explored the idea of recreating a newspaper. The first issue was released on 16 December 1992 in both the Kazakh and Russian languages.

==== Center for Military Medicine ====
The Centre for Military Medicine consists of 76 employees, experts, and doctors. The history of the Centre for Military Medicine, which has no analogues in Central Asia, began on 1 November 1969, when the forensic laboratory of the Central Asian Military District was established. After Kazakhstan gained independence, it was renamed the Central Medical Laboratory of the Ministry of Defence. In 2010, the institution received its current name. Since 2011, it has included an internship for the medical staff of the Armed Forces of Kazakhstan. The medical centre provides education in the field of military medicine and is responsible for organisational and educational work in the field of advanced training and course training. Its teaching staff is involved in training peacekeepers for United Nations missions. It is attached to the Main Military Medical Directorate of the Ministry of Defence.

==== Central Army Sports Club ====
The Central Army Sports Club (Russian: ЦСКА, CSKA) is a Kazakh sports club based in Almaty. The history of military sports in Kazakhstan dates back to 1970, when a sports battalion was formed in the Central Asian Military District, forming the 42nd Sports Company in 1974 and subsequently the 12th Sports Club of the Army in 1978. On the directive of the Central Staff of the USSR, on 5 January 1990, the 12th Army Sports Club was transformed into a branch of the Order of Lenin Central Sports Club. After independence was achieved, on 11 February 1992, it was reorganised into the Central Army Sports Club of the State Defence Committee.

In March 1994, it was renamed the Sports Committee of the Ministry of Defence of the Republic of Kazakhstan. Nine athletes from the club were included in the national team at the 2017 Winter Universiade in Almaty, competing in biathlon, cross-country skiing, and ice hockey. In July 2019, club member Sergey Tsyrulnikov, a four-time Guinness record holder, broke a record by using only one hand to nail frying pans into wooden planks in just under two minutes.

==== Kazspetsexport ====
Kazspetsexport is a state company funded and controlled by the Ministry of Defence of Kazakhstan. In January 2012, Airbus Military signed a firm contract with Kazspetsexport to supply two EADS CASA C-295 military transport aircraft, plus a related service support package for spare parts and ground support equipment.

== List of Defence Ministers of Kazakhstan ==
- Sagadat Nurmagambetov (May 1992 – 16 October 1995)
- Alybek Kasimov (16 October 1995 – 30 October 1996)
- Mukhtar Altynbayev (30 October 1996 – 9 August 1999)
- vacant from 9 August to 13 October 1999
- Sat Tokpakbayev (13 October 1999 – 8 December 2001)
- Mukhtar Altynbayev (8 December 2001 – 10 January 2007)
- Daniyal Akhmetov (10 January 2007 – 24 June 2009)
- Adilbek Zhaksybekov (24 June 2009 – 3 April 2014)
- Serik Akhmetov (3 April – 22 October 2014)
- Imangali Tasmagambetov (22 October 2014 – 13 September 2016)
- Saken Zhasuzakov (13 September 2016 – 7 August 2018)
- Nurlan Ermekbaev (7 August 2018 – 31 August 2021)
- Murat Bektanov (31 August 2021 – 19 January 2022)
- Ruslan Jaqsylyqov (19 January 2022 – 8 June 2025)
- Dauren Kossanov (8 June 2025 – 27 September 2026)
- Aidos Myrzakhmetov (since 27 September 2026)

== Awards ==
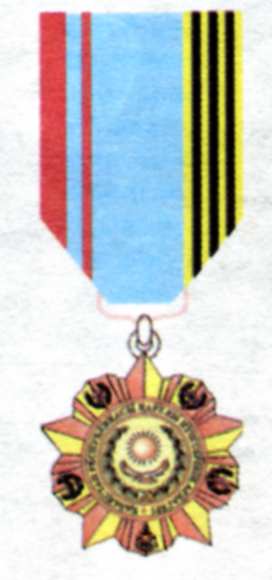
Medal "Veteran of the Armed Forces"

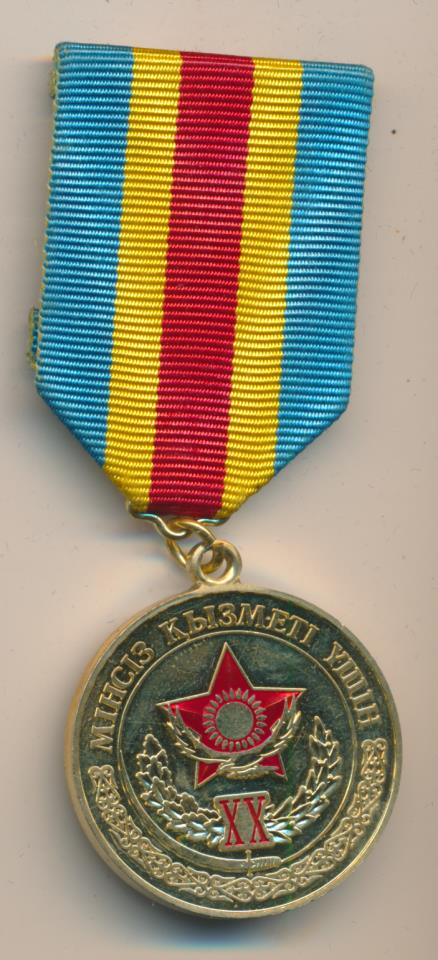
Мedal "For Faultless Service" 1st class

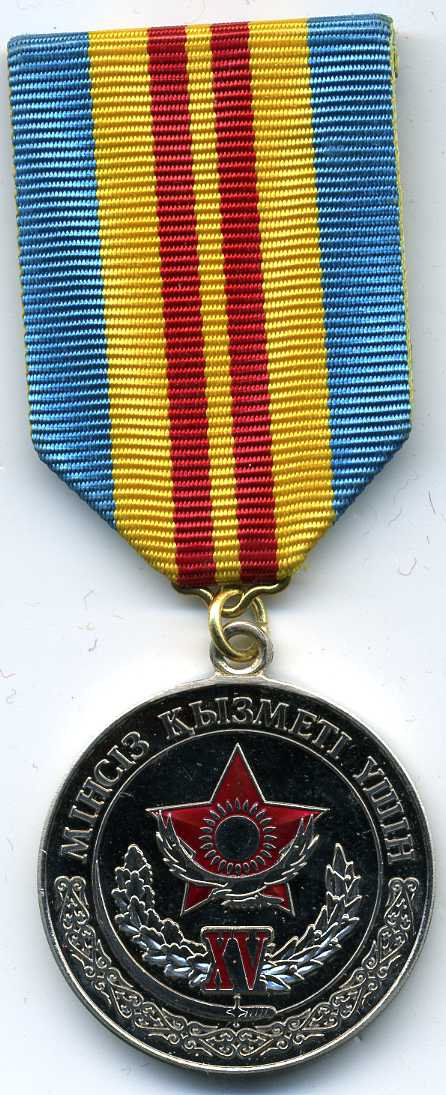
Мedal "For Faultless Service" 2nd class

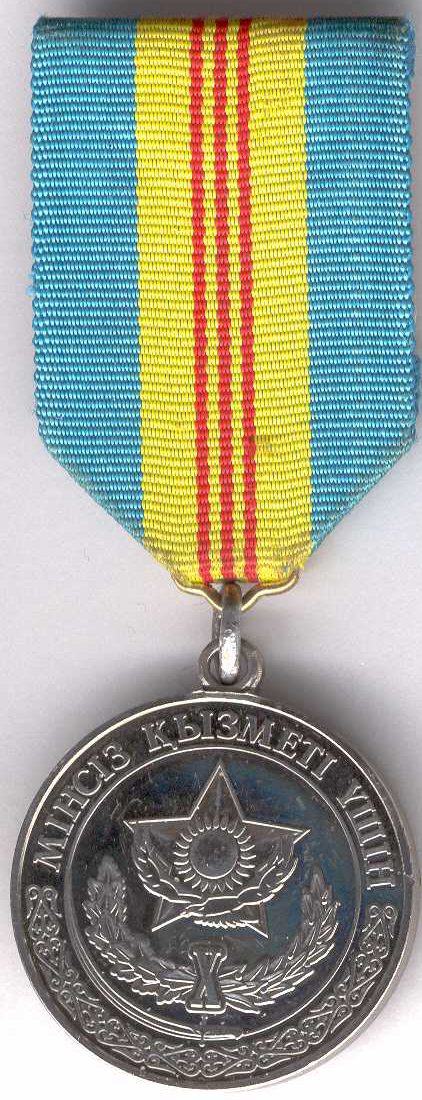
Мedal "For Faultless Service" 3rd class

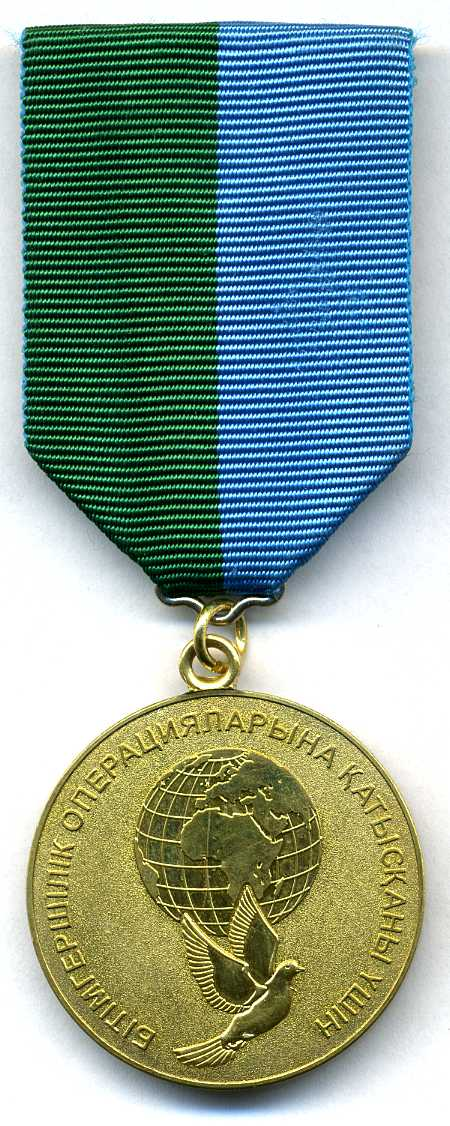
Medal "For participation in peacekeeping operations"

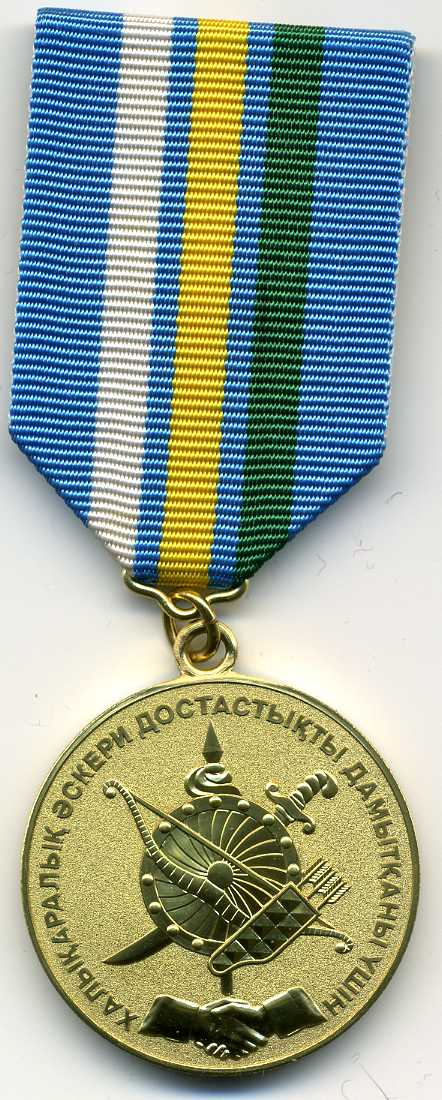
Medal "For contribution to the development of international cooperation"

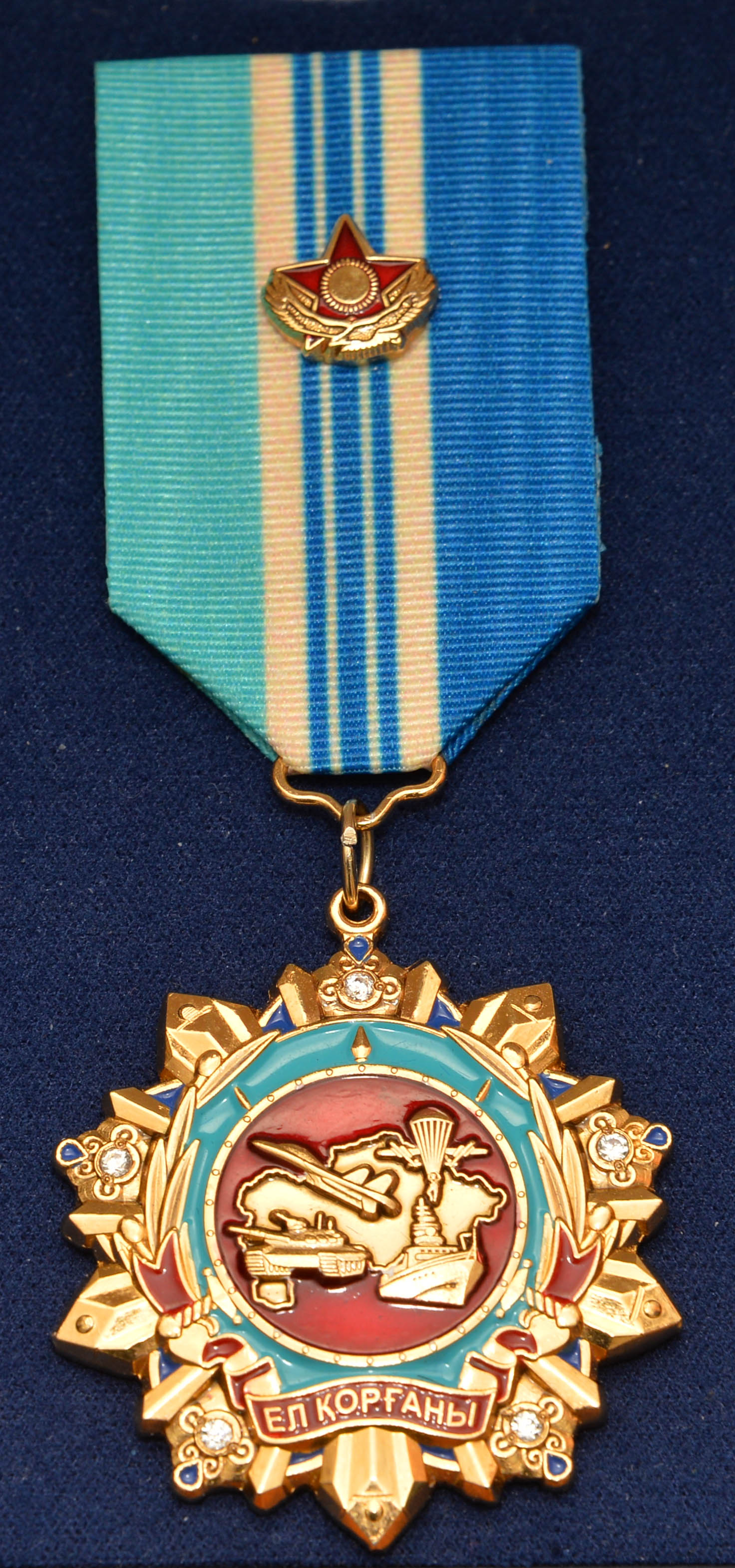
Medal "Defender of the Fatherland" 1st class

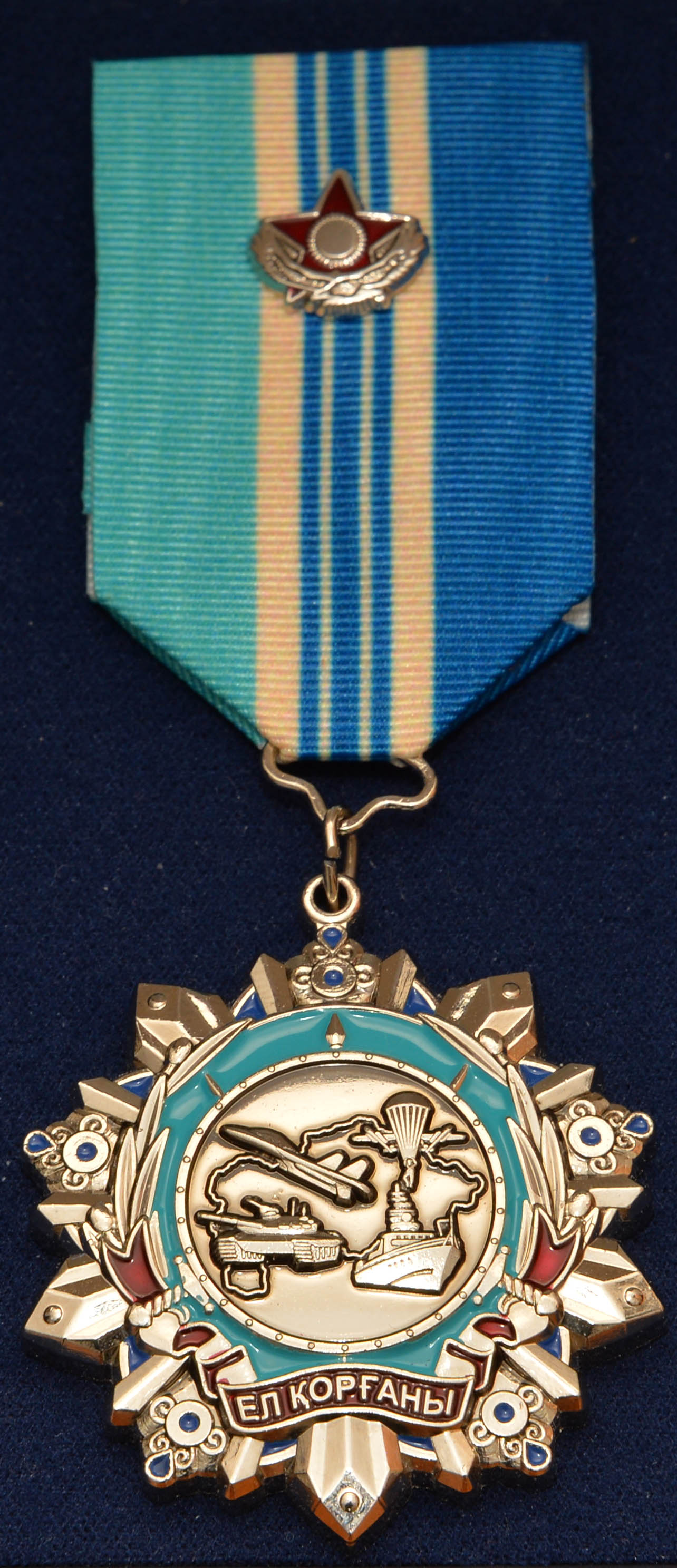
Medal "Defender of the Fatherland" 2nd class

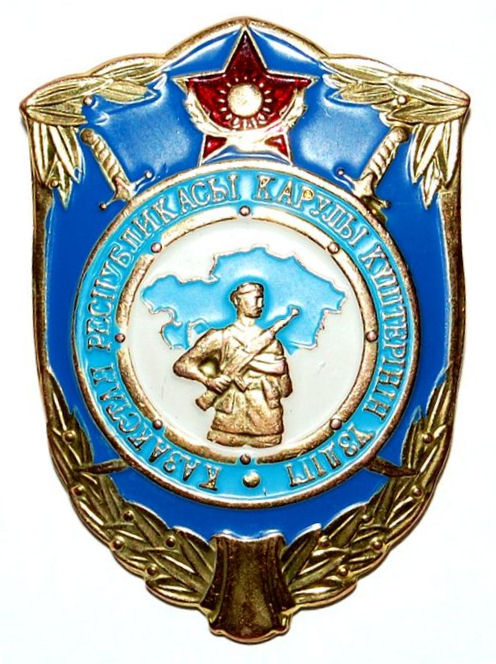
Medal "For Distinguished Service"

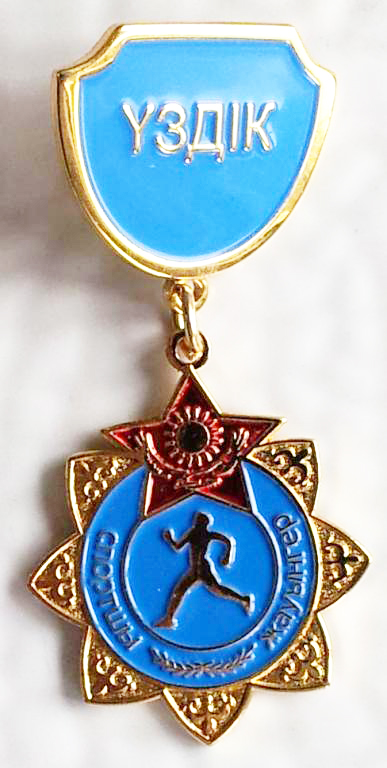
best warrior athlete

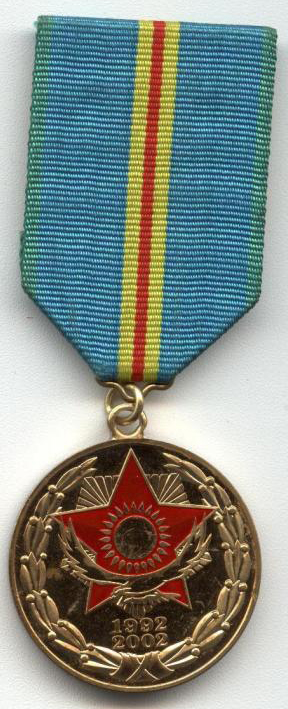
Jubilee Medal "10 years of the Kazakh Armed Forces"

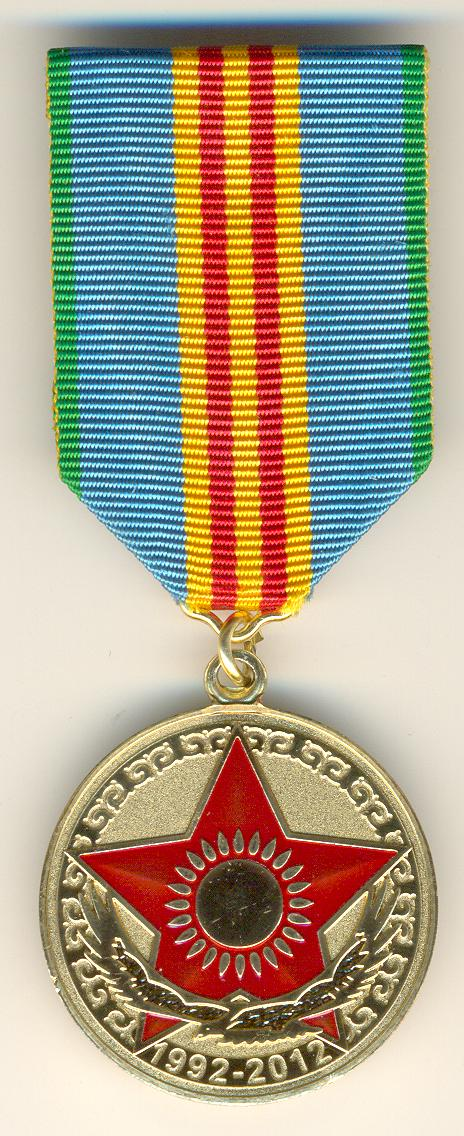
Jubilee Medal "20 years of the Kazakh Armed Forces"

== See also ==
- Ministry of Defence (Tajikistan)
- Ministry of Defense (Kyrgyzstan)
- Ministry of Defense (Turkmenistan)
- Ministry of Defense (Uzbekistan)
