= Menıñ Qazaqstanym =

National anthem of Kazakhstan

English: My Kazakhstan
- Менің Қазақстаным
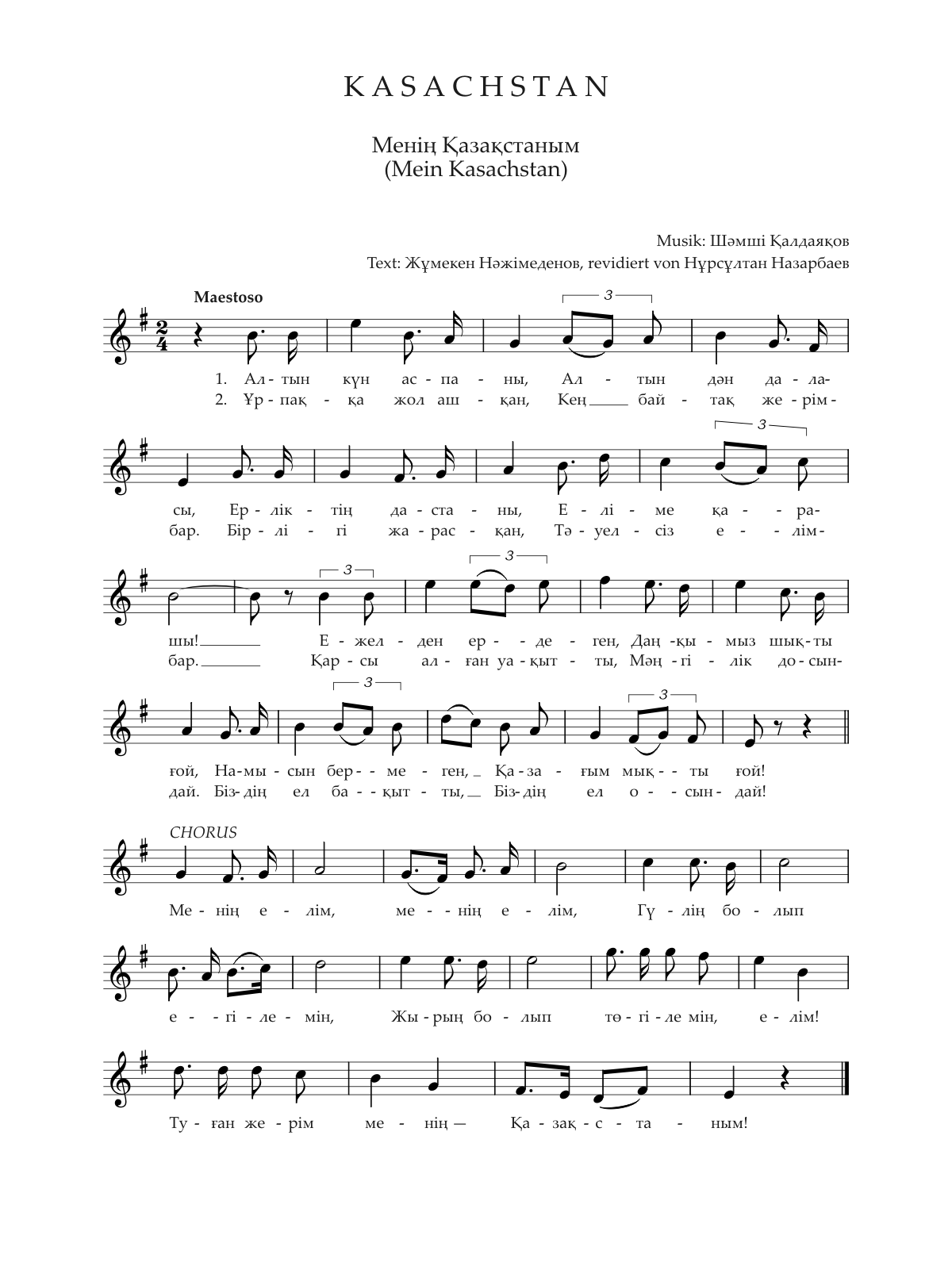
- Text and score of "Menıñ Qazaqstanym"
- National anthem of Kazakhstan
- Also known as: Қазақстан Республикасының Мемлекеттік гимні (English: State Anthem of the Republic of Kazakhstan)
- Lyrics: Jumeken Najimedenov, 1956 (original song); Nursultan Nazarbayev, 2006 (later modifications)
- Music: Shamshi Kaldayakov, 1956
- Adopted: 7 January 2006
- Preceded by: Anthem of the Republic of Kazakhstan

Audio sample
- 2012 official orchestral recording in D minor: file; help

2006 official orchestral and male/choral vocal recording (with final chorus repeat)
Performed by the Choir of the Abay Opera House and the State Symphony Orchestra of the Republic of Kazakhstan

2006 official orchestral instrumental recording
Performed by the State Symphony Orchestra of the Republic of Kazakhstan

2009 U.S. Navy Band instrumental version (with final chorus repeat)

The State Anthem of the Republic of Kazakhstan (Note: Kazakh: Қазақстан Республикасының Мемлекеттік гимні, romanized: Qazaqstan Respublikasynyñ Memlekettık gimnı; Russian: Государственный гимн Республики Казахстан, romanized: Gosudarstvennyj gimn Respubliki Kazahstan) was officially adopted on 7 January 2006, replacing the previous anthem first used upon independence in 1991.

The anthem is based on a homonymous patriotic song, "My Kazakhstan," (Note: Kazakh: Менің Қазақстаным, romanized: Menıñ Qazaqstanym; Russian: Мой Казахстан, romanized: Moj Kazahstan) created by Kazakh composer Shamshi Kaldayakov and poet Jumeken Najimedenov in 1956. The original lyrics were modified in 2005 by the first president of Kazakhstan, Nursultan Nazarbayev before the decree was issued.

== History ==
In 1943, when Kazakhstan was part of the Soviet Union, a competition was announced to create an anthem for the Kazakh nation. The then-27-year-old poet Qaiym Muhamedhanov, in collaboration with Äbdilda Täjibaev and Ğabıt Müsirepov, wrote the lyrics to the anthem, which were set to the music composed by Mukan Tölebaev, Eugene Brusilovsky and Latıf Hamıdı. Their work was then chosen by Supreme Soviet of the Kazakh Soviet Socialist Republic to be used as the Republic's official regional anthem.

After the dissolution of the Soviet Union, new lyrics were used for the succeeding anthem; however, the Soviet-era melody was retained.

On 9 May 2000, a ceremony was held, and then-President Nursultan Nazarbayev publicly stated that there should be a new anthem. A few weeks later, the Mäjilis took into consideration a replacement. A few candidates had been selected, but the process had later been abandoned.

In 2005, a popular patriotic song written in 1956, titled "Menıñ Qazaqstanym", was chosen to be the new national anthem of Kazakhstan. The song originally had three verses of eight lines each, along with the chorus. Nazarbayev modified the lyrics and reduced the text to two verses followed by the chorus. The first verse and the chorus of the original text were changed slightly, the second verse was omitted completely, and the third verse (now serving as the second verse in the current official edition) had five of the eight lines changed. On 7 January 2006, the new text was amended to comply with the status of the national anthem.

The law for listening to the national anthem was also changed. When the national anthem is performed at official ceremonies, citizens of Kazakhstan must stand up and place the palm of their right hand on the left side of their chest.

== Lyrics ==
=== Current official ===
Kazakh original

Cyrillic script	Latin script
Алтын күн аспаны, Алтын дән даласы, Ерліктің дастаны — Еліме қарашы! Ежелден ер деген, Даңқымыз шықты ғой, Намысын бермеген, Қазағым мықты ғой! Қайырмасы: Менің елім, менің елім, Гүлің болып егілемін, Жырың болып төгілемін, елім! Туған жерім менің — Қазақстаным! Ұрпаққа жол ашқан, Кең байтақ жерім бар. Бірлігі жарасқан, Тәуелсіз елім бар. Қарсы алған уақытты, Мәңгілік досындай. Біздің ел бақытты, Біздің ел осындай! Қайырмасы	Altyn kün aspany, Altyn dän dalasy, Erlıktıñ dastany — Elıme qaraşy! Ejelden er degen, Dañqymyz şyqty ğoi, Namysyn bermegen, Qazağym myqty ğoi! Qaiyrmasy: Menıñ elım, menıñ elım, Gülıñ bolyp egılemın, Jyryñ bolyp tögılemın, elım! Tuğan jerım menıñ — Qazaqstanym! Ūrpaqqa jol aşqan, Keñ baitaq jerım bar. Bırlıgı jarasqan, Täuelsız elım bar. Qarsy alğan uaqytty, Mäñgılık dosındai. Bızdıñ el baqytty, Bızdıñ el osyndai! Qaiyrmasy
Arabic script	IPA transcription (Note: See Help:IPA/Kazakh and Kazakh phonology.)
،التىن ءكۇن اسپانى ،التىن ءدان دالاسى — ەرلىكتىڭ داستانى.ەلىمە قاراشى ،ەجەلدەن ەر دەگەن ،داڭقىمىز شىقتى عوي ،نامىسىن بەرمەگەن !قازاعىم مىقتى عوي :قايىرماسى ،مەنىڭ ەلىم، مەنىڭ ەلىم ،گۇلىڭ بولىپ ەگىلەمىن !جىرىڭ بولىپ توگىلەمىن، ەلىم !تۋعان جەرىم مەنىڭ — قازاقستانىم ،ۇرپاققا جول اشقان.كەڭ بايتاق جەرىم بار ،بىرلىگى جاراسقان.تاۋەلسىز ەلىم بار ،قارسى العان ۋاقىتتى.ماڭگىلىك دوسىنداي ،ءبىزدىڭ ەل باقىتتى !ءبىزدىڭ ەل وسىنداي قايىرماسى	[ɑɫ.tʰə́n kʰʉn ɑs.pʰɑ.nə́ |] [ɑɫ.tʰə́n dæn dɑ.ɫɑ.sə́ |] [jer.lɘk.tʰɘ́ŋ dɑs.tʰɑ.nə́ |] [je.lɘ.mé qʰɑ.rɑ́.ɕə ǁ] [je.ʑel.dén jer de.ɣén |] [dɑɴ.qʰə.mə́s ɕəq.tʰə́ ʁoj ǁ] [nɑ.mə.sə́n ber.me.ɣén |] [qʰɑ.zɑ.ʁə́m məq.tʰə́ ʁoj ǁ] [qʰɑ.jər.mɑ.sə́] [me.nɘ́ŋ je.lɘ́m | me.nɘ́ŋ je.lɘ́m |] [gʉ.lɘ́ŋ bo.ɫə́p | je.ɣɘ.lé.mɘn |] [ʑə.rə́ŋ bo.ɫə́p tʰɵ.ɣɘ.lé.mɘn | je.lɘ́m ǁ] [tʰu.ʁɑ́n ʑe.rɘ́m me.nɘ́ŋ | qʰɑ.zɑ.ʁəs.tʰɑ.nə́m ǁ] [ʊr.pʰɑq.qʰɑ́ ʑoɫ ɑɕ.qʰɑ́n |] [kʰeŋ bɑj.tʰɑ́q ʑe.rɘ́m bɑr ǁ] [bɘr.lɘ.ɣɘ́ ʑɑ.rɑs.qʰɑ́n |] [tʰæ.ɥel.sɘ́s je.lɘ́m bɑr ǁ] [qʰɑr.s‿ɑɫ.ʁɑ́n wɑ.χət.tʰə́ |] [mæŋ.ɡɘ.lɘ́k do.sə́n.dɑj ǁ] [bɘz.dɘ́ŋ jel bɑ.χət.tʰə́ |] [bɘz.dɘ́ŋ jel wo.sə́n.dɑj ǁ] [qʰɑ.jər.mɑ.sə́]

English translation

Sky of golden sun,
Steppe of golden seed,
Legend of courage —
Take a look at my country!
From the antiquity
Our heroic glory emerged,
They did not give up their pride
My Kazakh people are strong!

Chorus:
My country, my country,
As your flower I will be planted,
As your song I will stream, my country!
My native land — My Kazakhstan!

The way was opened to the descendants
By the vast land I have.
Its unity is proper,
I have an independent country.
It welcomed the tests of time
Like an eternal friend,
Our country is blessed,
Our country is such!

Chorus

Russian translation (poetic)

Солнца свет в небесах,
Урожай на полях,
Песнь о смелых сынах
Прославляют в веках!
Слава нашей земли
С давних пор на устах.
Как ты горд и силён,
Мой родной Казахстан!

Припев:
Край мой родной! Мой народ со мной!
В поле цветок, взращенный тобой.
Песня звенит на устах народа:
Родина — свобода — вечный Казахстан!

Все пути предо мной
Распахнул шар земной,
И сплочённый народ
В светлый путь нас зовёт.
Кровных уз и добра,
Счастья нового дня —
Ты, отчизна моя,
Всё дала мне сполна!

Припев

Russian translation (literal)

В её небе золотое солнце, В её степях золотое зерно, Она поэма мужеству Посмотри на мою страну!

В седой древности Родилась наша слава. Никогда не терявших части, Силён мой Казахский народ!

Припев: О, мой народ! О, моя страна! Я посаженный тобой цветок, Я твоя льющаяся песня, моя страна! Моя родная земля — мой Казахстан!

Открывающая путь будущим поколениям Широкая необъятная земля есть у меня. Сплочённая в единстве, Независимая страна есть у меня

Встречает (новое) время Как извечного друга. Наша страна счастливая, Наша страна такая!

Припев}}</poem>

== Original song ==
The national anthem of Kazakhstan is based on a 1956 patriotic song titled "My Kazakhstan" (Kazakh: Menıñ Qazaqstanyn). It was created in response to the Soviet Virgin Lands Campaign program, insisting Soviet authorities to not turn Kazakhstan into Russia's corn belt.

Kazakh original

Cyrillic script

Алтын күн аспаны, алтын дән даласы,
Думанды бастады — далама қарашы.
Кең екен жер деген, жерге гүл шықты ғой,
Дән егіп терлеген, қазағым мықты ғой!

Қайырмасы:
Mенің елім, менің елім,
Жырың болып төгілемін!
Гүлің болып егілемін, елім!
Tуған жерім — менің Қазақстаным!

Айналап қарасам, ғашықты жүрегім,
Заманға жарассам, жарасып тұр елім.
Біздің ел — ордынды, көтерді туларды,
Желмен ол тербелді, термеде жырладым.

Қайырмасы

Сағымды далам бар, сабырлы көлім бар,
Қараңдар, жараңдар — осындай елім бар.
Қарсы алған уақытты, ежелгі досындай,
Біздің ел бақытты, біздің ел осындай!

Қайырмасы

Latin script

Altyn kün aspany, altyn dän dalasy,
Dumandy bastady – dalama qaraşy!
Keñ eken jer degen, jerge gül şyqty ğoi,
Dän egıp terlegen, qazağym myqty ğoi!

Qaiyrmasy:
Menıñ elım, menıñ elım,
Jyryñ bolyp tögılemın!
Gülıñ bolyp egılemın, elım!
Tuğan jerım – menıñ Qazaqstanym!

Ainalap qarasam, ğaşyqty jüregım,
Zamanğa jarassam, jarasyp tūr elım.
Bızdıñ el – ordyndy, köterdı tulardy,
Jelmen ol tеrbeldı, termede jyrladym.

Qaiyrmasy

Sağymdy dalam bar, sabyrly kölım bar,
Qarañdar, jarañdar – osyndai elım bar.
Qarsy alğan uaqytty, ejelgı dosyndai,
Bızdıñ el baqytty, bızdıñ el osyndai!

Qaiyrmasy

English translation

Sky of golden sun, field of golden grain,
Look at it all and be filled with wonder.
A wide country, flowers planted on the ground,
Wheat sewn with toil, the Kazakhs are strong!

Chorus:
My country, my country,
I will flow like a song.
I will be your flower, my country!
Native homeland – my Kazakhstan!

When I look around, my heart falls in love,
If I love my country, all will be fine.
On our country, the banners were raised,
They waved in the sun as we all sang.

Chorus

From the quiet steppe to the calm lakes,
Look at all of it – this country is mine.
All people are united like old friends.
Our country is happy, this all is our country!

Chorus

== Criticism ==
Nazarbayev's co-authorship was perceived in a negative light by some writers of Kazakhstan. In 2009, Kazakh poet Erlan Jünıs criticized the then-President of Kazakhstan, saying:

“Nazarbayev insulted the memory of Şämşı Qaldaiaqov and Jūmeken Näjımedenov. How could he attribute co-authorship to the anthem of Kazakhstan? What kind of poet is he? He never wrote poetry in his life. He added a couple of words, changed a couple of words, and that's it. […] I can also make my own minor changes to any work by Äuezov [or by] Dostoevsky. So, should I claim co-authorship? Any proofreader does this everyday. [It's] stupid.”

== 2012 sporting event incidents ==
In March 2012, a parody national anthem, titled "O Kazakhstan", featured in the soundtrack of the movie Borat, was mistakenly played at the International Shooting Grand Prix in Kuwait. The Gold-winning medalist, Mariya Dmitriyenko, stood on the dais while the entire parody was played. The team complained, and the award ceremony was re-staged. The incident apparently resulted from the wrong song being downloaded from YouTube at the last minute. Senior officials in Kazakhstan were furious with the error and vowed to make a complaint to their Kuwaiti counterparts.

A similar incident had taken place earlier that month at the opening ceremony of a skiing festival in Qostanai, in which the first bar of Ricky Martin's single "Livin' La Vida Loca" was played instead of "Menıñ Qazaqstanym". However, "Menıñ Qazaqstanym" was played properly following the mistake.

== See also ==
- Anthem of the Republic of Kazakhstan
- List of national anthems

== Notes ==
Preceded by Anthem of the Republic of Kazakhstan	National Anthem of Kazakhstan; 2006–	Succeeded by Current
