= Roza Baglanova =

Roza Baglanova Роза Бағланова
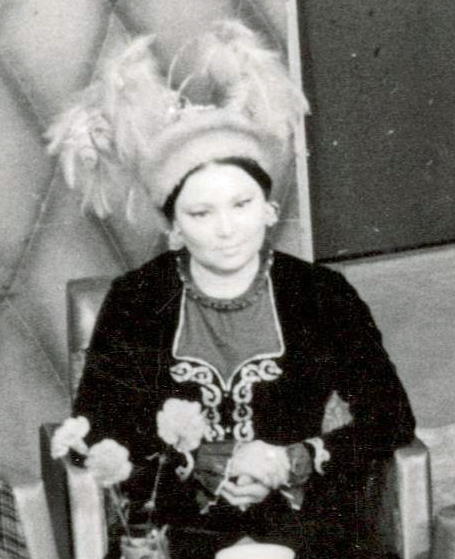

Background information
- Born: January 1, 1922; Kazalinsk, Russian SFSR, Soviet Union (now Kazakhstan)
- Died: February 8, 2011 (aged 89) Alma-Ata, Kazakhstan
- Genres: Opera, pop
- Occupation: Singer
- Instrument: Soprano vocals

Roza Urbiybi Tazhibaykyzy Baglanova (Note: Kazakh: Роза Тәжібайқызы Бағланова, romanized: Roza Täzhibayqyzy Baghlanova) (January 1, 1922 – February 8, 2011) was a Soviet and Kazakh soprano opera and pop music singer. She was honoured with many awards throughout her career, including the People's Artist of the USSR (1967) and the Order of Lenin. She was also deemed a Hero of Kazakhstan.

== Early life ==
=== Childhood and schooling ===
Baglanova was born in Kazalinsk, in Kyzylorda Region. The Baglanov family consisted of grandmother Kundey, father Tazhibay, mother Akkurush, Tazhibai's second wife the Tatar Maryam, and older brother Idris. Roza spent her whole childhood on the left coast of the river Syr Darya. Baglanova was encouraged to sing from a young age by her grandmother. She also sang at family feasts with her grandfather. Her two mothers liked singing and playing the accordion. Later Roza became an active member of the art club in the local theatre.

Following the death of her father, Baglanova's family was left to rely on the material wealth of her grandmother. Many possessions had to be sold off for essentials. Baglonova's grandmother and mothers also sold homemade clothes. Famine in the Kazakh steppe began in 1932, which aggravated the situation. At the start of winter, Baglonova had no weather-appropriate clothes, requiring her to use homemade alternatives. She lived in an area without paved roads which saw significant amounts of snowfall in the winter.

During her school years, Baglanova participated in many school, district, region, and republican concerts, including competitions in Kyzylorda, Almaty, Orenburg, in which she was able to win prizes.

Baglanova studied at the Kyzylorda Pedagogical Institute from 1939 to 1941. She dropped out of school in the university in her third year since the material situation of her family had worsened.

== Career ==
=== Early career ===
Baglanova moved to Tashkent, Uzbekistan, to live with family, where she began studying textiles as trade. In Tashkent she had a chance meeting with the soloist of Navoi Theater and the director of the Uzbek Philharmonic, Muhitdin Qoriyoqubov. Qoriyoqubov liked her singing and suggested she audition for the Uzbek Philharmonic. She was accepted there and performed as a soloist from 1941 to 1947.

At one of her concerts, her singing impressed the First Secretary of the Communist Party of Uzbekistan, Usman Yusupov. He provided Baglanova with a five-room apartment in the centre of the city and arranged to bring her remaining relatives to Tashkent.

In the summer of 1941, on the coast of the reservoir in the village Kattakurgan, Yusupov attended a second concert with Roza in the ensemble. After the concert, he gave Baglanova 1000 rubles and a scholarship to study at the Moscow Conservatory.

=== World War II ===
After the outbreak of the Eastern Front in 1941, Baglanova and her choir went to the frontline to lift the spirit of the Soviet Army soldiers. She continued this activity for the next four years. During this time, Baglanova sang for 15 hours a day without breaks and despite adverse conditions.

Due to this experience, Baglanova learned many folk songs and military songs. One such song was “Ah, Samara-gorodok” by Lidia Ruslanova. Ruslanova became acquainted with Baglanova and endorsed her usage of the song.

Baglanova sang in 20 various languages, which were the various languages of Soviet soldiers.

In 1943, Baglanova suffered an eye injury when she was hit by artillery fire. She underwent six operations to save her life. Following her recovery, she returned to the battlefield, where she assisted battlefield medics.

Baglanova was the only Soviet singer who was awarded the medal "For Battle Merit" twice during World War II. The first was awwarded on 1 May 1943, by Marshal Ivan Konev. The second was awarded on 22 February 1945, by Konstantin Rokossovsky, for Baglanova's performing for injured soldiers during the Warsaw Uprising.

On 2 May 1945, the singer returned to Moscow. As part of the army, she had gotten within 90 kilometres of Berlin. In Moscow, she celebrated the war victory and gave concerts with her ensemble.

=== Post-war period ===
In 1949, Baglanova returned to Uzbekistan with the help of Zhumabay Shayakhmetov, chief secretary of the Communist Party of Kazakhstan With the help of Yusupov, she returned to Kazakhstan, where she began living in Almaty. She began working for the Abay Opera House. That same year, Baglanova performed at the 70th birthday of Joseph Stalin, where she received a standing ovation from him and his guests, which included Mao Zedong, Jacques Duclos, Wilhelm Pieck, Klement Gottwald, and others.

Baglanova toured across the globe, including in within the Soviet Union, Poland, the German Democratic Republic, Belgium, Hungary, Austria, Czechoslovakia, the People's Republic of China, the Republic of Korea, India, Burma, Canada, and other countries. She frequently performed in the languages of the country she was visiting. Baglanova also participated in official state visits. She traveled to India twice with Nikita Khrushchev. During these visits, she met Jawaharlal Nehru and Indira Gandhi.

In 1949, Baglanova won the World Festival of Youth and Students in Budapest, which made her known internationally. Following that, she and the other competitors performed a concert together on Margaret Island. In 1955, during a tour of India, Baglanova was awarded the People's Artist of the Kazakh SSR.

In 1960, she began working for the Jambyl Kazakh State Philharmonic, where she played a part in developing the Kazakhconcert.

In 1967, after performing a concert in Semipalatinsk, Baglanova was awarded the People's Artist of the USSR.

On December 13, 1979, while performing at a concert in Pavlodar, Baglanova had a medical emergency in which she lost her vision. This was due to the shrapnel fragments stuck in her brain since the war. The singer did not stop the concert and continued performing. She received medical treatment in Moscow through April 1980, but her vision was not restored. She continued performing with the help of her son.

After that, she immediately flew to Moscow for an operation. She underwent three operations at once. The surgeons told her they needed another operation and explained why: one of the fragments from the mine was still in her head. The operation was completed successfully.

In November 2005, Baglanova's vision continued to get worse. She underwent another operation, which was able to fix her vision.

A memorial statue of Roza Baglanova at the center square of Kyzylorda, Kazakhstan

== Personal life ==
Baglanova married twice. She was married to her first husband, Sadyk Abdizhapparov, for 7 years. The second was Satybaldy Zhappayev, who she remained married to for almost 10 years. Baglanova attributed her lifestyle and frequent tours to her inability to maintain a stable home life.

Baglanova had one son, named Tazhen. Through him, she had two grandchildren.

=== Social activism ===
Roza was one of the first Kazakh civil rights activists who received attention within the greater Soviet Union. She advocated for equality, justice, and Kazakh independence. She also focused on environment issues, such as criticizing ecological disasters of the 20th century like the the Aral Sea problem and the Semipalatinsk Test Site. In order to promote these causes, Roza organised charitable concerts and festivals. Contributions were sought for ecological funds to ensure that all needy people would receive proper help.

=== Death ===
Baglanova died of a heart attack at the age of 89 in Alma-Ata.

== Tributes and memory ==
Following Baglanova's death, tributes were given in Kazakhstan, including from government officials. Documentaries were made about her. Several places have been named after her, such as a street and cultural center in Aiyteke.

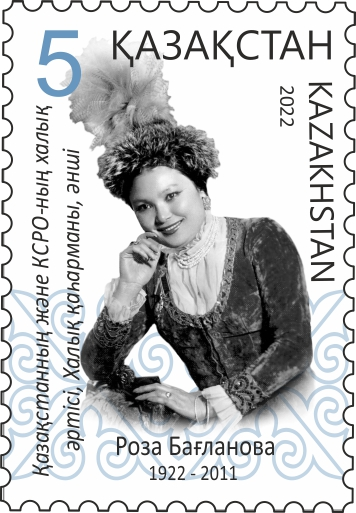
Baglanova on a 2022 stamp of Kazakhstan

In 2015, a marble bust of Baglanova was unveiled in her own home town in the Kazaly region. It was created by Bakhytzhan Abishev.

In January 2021, the president of Kazakhstan, Kassym-Jomart Tokayev, posted a tweet promising to build a historical monument in order to memorialise Baglanova and commemorate the 100th anniversary of the singer's birthday.

In 2021, UNESCO included Baglanova on the list of UNESCO anniversaries for 2022–2023 in honor of the 100th anniversary of her birth.

In April 2022, a monument to Baglanova was erected in Almaty. It was a bronze statue almost five meters tall was built in front of the building of the Jambyl Kazakh State Philharmonic.

== Awards ==
- People's Hero of Kazakhstan
- Order of Otan
- People's Artist of Kazakh SSR
- Medal "For Military Merit" (1945)
- People's Artist of the USSR (1967)
- Shapagat Medal (1995)
- People's Artist of Kyrgyzstan (1996)
- "Daneker" International Prize (2000)
- Order of Lenin
- Order of the Red Banner of Labor
- Order of Friendship of Peoples
- The Order of Honour
- Public Prize "Tarlan" - "Contribution"
