= Bibigul Tulegenova =

Soviet-Kazakh opera singer, actress, and educator

- Бибігүл Төлегенова
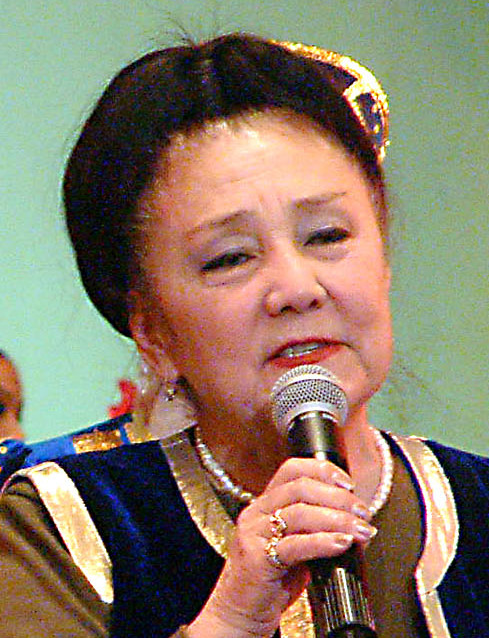
- Tulegenova in 2001
- Born: 16 December 1929 (age 96); Semipalatinsk, Kazakh ASSR, RSFSR, Soviet Union
- Occupation: Opera singer (soprano); actress; music pedagogue

Bibıgül Ahmetqyzy Tölegenova (Note: Often transliterated as Bibigul Akhmetovna Tulegenova through a Russified Romanization of Бибигуль Ахметовна Тулегенова.) (Kazakh: Бибігүл Ахметқызы Төлегенова; born 16 December 1929) is a Soviet-Kazakh opera singer (lyric and coloratura soprano), actress and teacher. Among her awards are Hero of Socialist Labor (1991), People's Artist of the USSR (1967), and the USSR State Prize (1970).

== Early life ==
Tulegenova was born in Semipalatinsk (modern Semey, East Kazakhstan region of Kazakhstan). She grew up in a musical family. Her father loved to play the violin and her Tatar mother sang. In 1937, her father was arrested in Katon-Karagai and disappeared. In 1946, while studying in seventh grade evening school, she went to work at a meat processing plant, where she could sing in an Amateur circle. The young singer drew the attention of writer Galina Serebryakova, who was in Semipalatinsk in exile. She took custody of Tulegenova, and gave her the first music lessons. At Serebryakova's insistence, Bibigul entered the vocal and choral faculty of the Kazan Conservatory in Alma-ata, where she studied under N. N. Samyshina and from which she graduated in 1954. In 1951, she worked as a soloist on the Kazakh radio, where she performed folk and pop songs.

== Career ==
In 1954, she became a soloist of the Abay Opera House in Almaty. In 1956, she became a soloist of the troupe of the Kazakh state academic orchestra of folk instruments of the Kazakh Philharmonics named after Kurmangazy. The troupe toured throughout the USSR. In 1958 she became a laureate of the All-Union competition of pop artists. In 1971, she returned as a soloist to Abay Opera House. She performed in concerts drawing on the classical and folk repertoire. She toured abroad in Asia, Europe and the Middle East. Beginning in 1980 she led a vocal class at the Kazakh National Conservatory Kurmangazy. She served as Artistic Director and Chairman of the jury of the International competition of vocalists of Bibigul Tulegenova (2001, 2004, 2007, 2010, 2011, 2012, 2014). She was a member of the armed forces of the Kazakh SSR 7-9 convocations (1968-1982).

Tulegenova is the only living Kazakhstani woman awarded the title of people's artist of the USSR. In addition, she is the last person in the history of the USSR to be awarded the title of Hero of Socialist Labor.

Her repertoire includes folk songs: "Gauhar Tas", "Zhiyrma Bes", works of Kazakh composers "Bulbul" L. Hamidi, "Kos Karlygash" E. Brusilovsky, "Eske Alu" M. Tulebaev, "Tarantella" E. Rakhmadiyev, "Koktem valsy" S. Mukhamedzhanov, as well as romances by P. I. Chaikovsky, S. V. Rachmaninov, arias from operas by N. Rimsky-Korsakova, works by Western composers (G. Donizetti, E. Grieg, F. Schubert), etc. She also performed concerts for voice with orchestra by R. Glier and S. Mukhamedzhanov.

== Personal life ==
Tulegenova resides in Almaty.

== Opera roles ==
Tulegenova's opera roles have included:

- Kyz Zhibek in Kyz Zhibek by Yevgeny Brusilovsky
- Azhar in Abay by Akhmed Zhubanov and Latif Khamidi
- Enlik in Enlik-Kebek by Gaziza Zhubanova
- Gulbarshin in Alpamys by Yerkegali Rakhmadiev
- Altynshash in Altynshash by Nazib Zhiganov
- Violetta in La traviata by Giuseppe Verdi
- Gilda in Rigoletto by Giuseppe Verdi
- Rosina in The Barber of Seville by Gioachino Rossini
- Norina in Don Pasquale by Gaetano Donizetti
- Zerlina in Don Giovanni by Wolfgang Amadeus Mozart
- The Snow Maiden in The Snow Maiden by Nikolai Rimsky-Korsakov

== Filmography ==
- 1954 - Daughter of the Steppes, as Karashash
- 1955 - It Happened in Shugla, as Maira (song performance)
- 1957 - Our Dear doctor, song performance of "Waltz of Spring" by Aleksandr Zatsepin
- 1968 - Angel Wearing a Tubeteika, as herself
- 1975 - Keep Your Star, song performance
- 2005 - Parallel Voices, as herself
- 2011 - Aldar Kose, as Aldar's grandmother
- 2011 - The Sky of My Childhood, as Nursultan's grandmother

== Discography ==
- 2002-Suikti Ander (Beloved Songs)
- 2005-CD "Outstanding masters of vocal art of Kazakhstan" (Ermek Serkebayev, Roza Jamanova, Bibigul Tulegenova, Alibek Dnishev), the tenth issue in the series "Asyl Mura".
- 2006-Bibigul Tulegenova. "Special Edition", Vocal anthology (10 CD).
- 2011 - "Under the Golden moon" (Archival records)

== Recognition ==
- People's Artist of the Kazakh SSR (1959)
- People's Artist of the USSR (1967)
- State Prize of the USSR (1970) - for concert programs 1967-1968
- State Prize of the Kazakh SSR. After K. Baiseitova (1966)
- Hero of Socialist Labor (21.12.1991)
- Two orders of Lenin (23.03.1976; 21.12.1991)
- Order of The Red Banner of Labor (03.01.1959)
- Order of Otan (2000)

=== Medals ===
- Personal Gold badge of the President of the Republic of Kazakhstan (1999)
- "Person of the year" in the nomination " For contribution to the musical art of Kazakhstan "(2001)
- Independent national award "Tarlan" ("for contribution" in the section "Music", "club of patrons of Kazakhstan", 2001)
- A star on the Alley of Stars of Kazakhstan (2002)
- Interstate award "stars of the Commonwealth" in the field of humanitarian activities (Council for humanitarian cooperation of the CIS member States, 2014)
- Honorary citizen of Astana (1999)
- Honorary citizen of East Kazakhstan region (2011)
- Honorary citizen of Almaty (2012)
- State scholarship of the First President of the Republic of Kazakhstan-the Leader of the Nation in the field of culture. (2016)
- State scholarship of the First President of the Republic of Kazakhstan — Leader in the field of culture (2017)

== Literature ==
Серкебаева Ирина. Бибигуль Тулегенова: любить, надеяться и верить, Алматы, «Атамура», 2012 (biography, Bibigul Tulegenova: To love, hope and believe)
