= Lyudmila Rudakova =

Kazakh ballerina (1937–2026)

- Людмила Pудакова
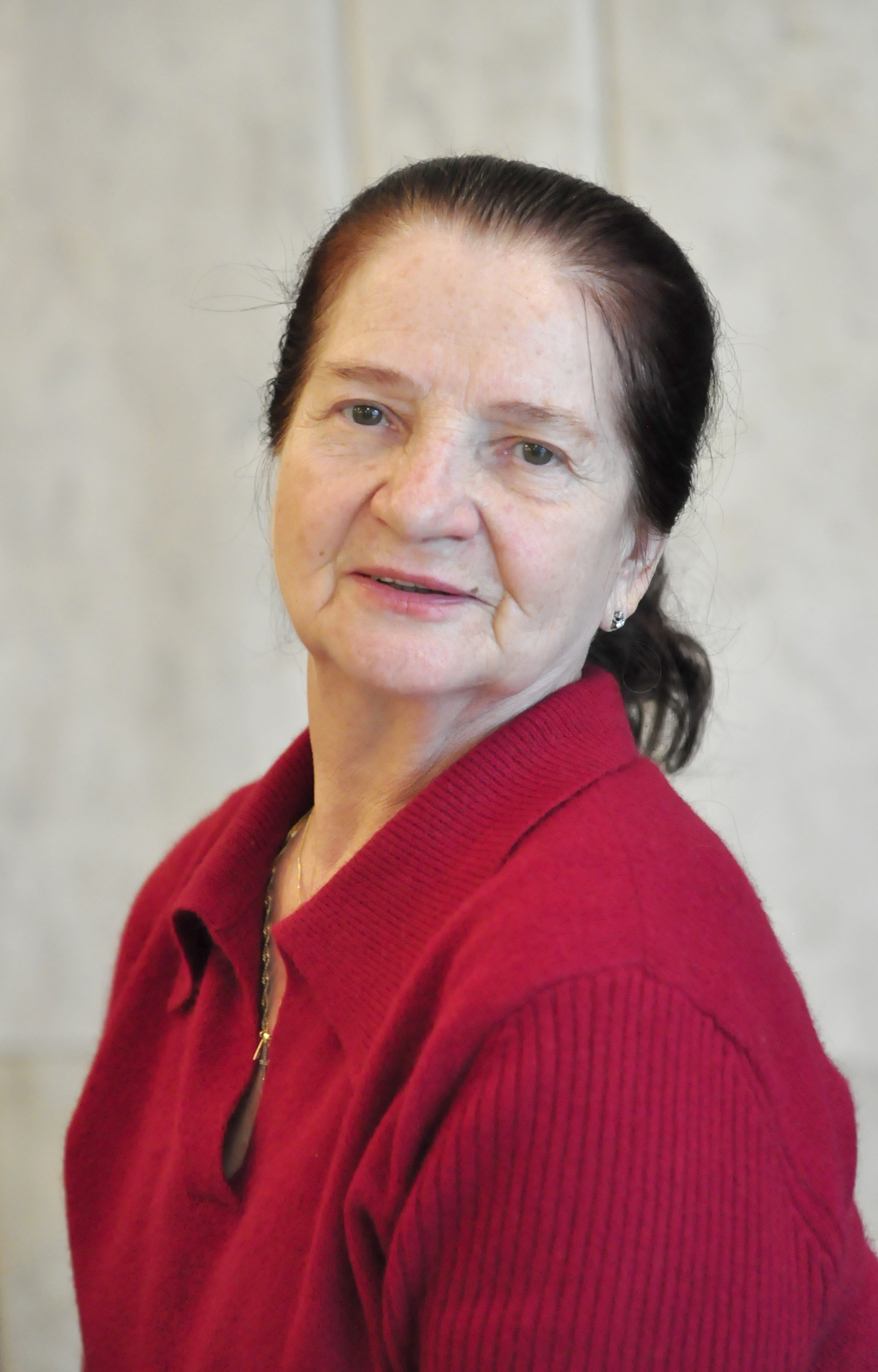
- Rudakova in 2010
- Born: Lyudmila Georgiyevna Rudakova; 27 August 1937; Grozny, Checheno-Ingush ASSR, Russian SFSR, Soviet Union
- Died: 26 July 2026 (aged 88); Almaty, Kazakhstan
- Education: Baku Choreographic School
- Occupation: Ballerina
- Years active: 1956–2026
- Spouse: Ramazan Bapov (m. 1968; died 2014)

Lyudmila Georgiyevna Rudakova (Russian: Людмила Георгиевна Рудакова; 27 August 1937 – 26 July 2026) was a Kazakh ballerina. In 1984, she got the Honored Artist of the Kazakh SSR.

== Early life and career ==
Lyudmila Rudakova was born in Grozny, Checheno-Ingush ASSR, Russian SFSR on 27 August 1937. She was the daughter of Georgiyevna Rudakova, a soldier, and his wife, an accountant at Baku. Her father died during World War II, and she was raised by her mother and grandparents. She moved with her mother to Baku in 1947.

She studied in the Baku Choreographic School at the Azerbaijan State Academic Opera and Ballet Theater. During her studies, she got taught by many famous ballet dancers such as Vasili Vainonen, Rostislav Zakharov, Konstantin Sergeyev, and Pyotr Gusev. She studied in the master class of Gamar Almaszadeh, the first Azerbaijani ballerina. She graduated from the school in 1956.

In 1984, Rudakova was awarded Honored Artist of the Kazakh SSR. Since 1980, She has worked at the Abay Opera House as a teacher. Until 2018, she was a teacher-consultant at the Almaty Choreographic School. As a teacher, Rudakova has been invited to leading ballet schools in Turkey, Lithuania, the USA, and Hong Kong, and she has served as a jury member for many ballet competitions.

In 2021, she starred in the short film "Ballerina's Time" as part of the Qazaq Ballet Creative Lab's speicla video project.

== Personal life and death ==
In 1968, Rudakova was married to Ramazan Bapov at the Abai State Academic Opera and Ballet Theatre. They had one daughter, Yulia Ramazanovna Bapova.

Rudakov died in Almaty, Kazakhstan on 26 July 2026, at the age of 88.
