= Ramazan Bapov =

- Рамазан Бапов
- Born: 16 August 1947; Almaty, Kazakh SSR, Soviet Union
- Died: March 11, 2014 (aged 66); Almaty, Kazakhstan
- Education: Moscow State Academy of Choreography
- Occupations: Kazakh ballet dancer, ballet master, choreographer
- Years active: 1967
- Spouse: Lyudmila Rudakova
- Children: Julia Bapova
- Awards: Order of the Badge of Honour

Ramazan Salyqūly Bapov (Note: Kazakh: Рамазан Салықұлы Бапов; Russian: Рамазан Саликович Бапов, romanized: Ramazan Salikovich Bapov) (16 August 1947 – 11 March 2014) was a Soviet and Kazakh ballet master dancer, choreographer, and educator, who was People’s Artist of the USSR (1979).

== Biography ==
Born to a simple working family around Almaty-1 station on August 16, 1947, Ramazan graduated with honors from Moscow State Academy of Choreography at the Bolshoi Theatre in 1966.

While still a student, Ramazan Bapov was awarded prizes of USSR-wide Ballet Artist Competition in Moscow and 2 international competitions in Varna.

Upon his return to Alma-Ata in 1967, Bapov became a soloist at The Kazakh Opera and Ballet Theater after Abay. He was invited to Moscow to train undr Alexander Rudenko, Aleksey Varlamov and Asaf Messerer. Bapov performed around the world as a member of a Moscow-founded ballet company composed of international competition winners. Thus he worked for 2 institutions, polishing his skills at the Bolshoi and practicing at Abay Opera House. He toured a lot in Denmark, Sweden and Finland, Syria and Jordan, India and Sri Lanka, Malaysia and Singapore, among other countries.

Ramazan Bapov was awarded the distinction of the People's Artist of the USSR in 1979, the only Kazakhstani dancer to receive such a lofty title. As he finished to perform on stage, Bapov obtained a degree in Ballet Staging from Rimsky-Korsakov Leningrad Conservatory in 1986 and two years later joined State Opera and Ballet in Istanbul (Turkey), where he taught a male ballet class. In 1994, when Bapov took his Turkish students to an international competition in Varna, Bulgaria, he met his old friend Pavel Rotaru, a Romanian ballet dancer, who invited him to the USA. Ramazan spent 13 years in Atlanta State of Georgia, running his own ballet school for 140 students, some of whom took first prizes in US national competitions.

Following President Nazarbayev’s invitation in 2007, Bapov returned to Kazakhstan and headed the ballet division of Abay Opera House. In his twilight years Ramazan Bapov worked as a choreography advisor and professor at Zhurgenov Kazakh National Academy of Arts. Anna Tsoi, Damir Urazymbetov, Oryngul Nurzhankyzy and others were among his students. Ramazan spoke Russian, Turkish, English and French. He died on March 11, 2014, and was buried in the Kensai Cemetery in Almaty.

== Repertoire ==
=== A selected list of ballet performances ===
- Frondoso — Laurencia A. Krein
- Young Man — Aliya by Mansur Sagatov
- Hooligan — The Lady and the Hooligan by D. Shostakovich
- Vaslav — The Fountain of Bakhchisarai by B. Asafyev
- Solor — La Bayadère by L. Minkus
- Basil — Don Quixote by L. Minkus
- Albert — Giselle by A. Adam
- Kozy — Kozy Korpesh and Bojan Sulu by Y. Brusilovsky
- Siegfried — Swan Lake by P. Tchaikovsky
- Tayo — The Legend of the White Bird by G. Zhubanova
- Pulcinella — Pulcinella by Igor Stravinsky inspired by G. Pergolesi
- Romeo — Romeo and Juliet by S. Prokofiev
- Spartacus — Spartacus by A. Khachaturian
- Désiré — The Sleeping Beauty by P. Tchaikovsky
- Ishpaka — Frescoes by Т. Mynbayev

== Family ==
- Ramazan Bapov’s wife Lyudmila Rudakova (1937), formerly a prima ballerina of Abay Opera House, now teaches at Almaty Choreographic School named after Alexander Seleznev and Abay Opera House . Honored Artist of the Kazakh SSR.
- His daughter Yulia Bapova (1969), is a pianist and correpetitor at Istanbul Opera Bale (Turkey).

== Legacy ==
- A monument to Ramazan Bapov by sculptors Eduard Kazaryan and Kairzhan Tokishev was unveiled in Kensai on August 5, 2015.
- A street in Almaty was named after Ramazan Bapov in 2022.
- On July 8, 2022, a plaque was put up on the wall of the house at Nazarbayev Avenue (formerly Furmanov Av.), 116 where Bapov lived between 1977 and 2014 to commemorate his 75th anniversary. Altai Beysenov’s plaque shows Bapov in his roles in Spartacus and Giselle.\

== Awards and honours ==
- 1966 — 2nd diploma winner in the Varna International Ballet Competition
- 1968 — Awardee of the USSR-wide Ballet Artist Competition in Moscow
- 1970 — Jubilee Medal "In Commemoration of the 100th Anniversary of the Birth of Vladimir Ilyich Lenin"
- 1971 — Recipient of the Order of the Badge of Honour
- 1973 — Honored Artist of the Kazakh SSR
- 1974 — 3rd award of the Varna International Ballet Competition
- 1976 — State Award of the Kazakh SSR
- 1976 — People’s Artist of the Kazakh SSR
- 1979 — People's Artist of the USSR
- 1980 — Lenin Komsomol Prize for excellence in performance
