= Alibek Dnishev =

Kazakh chamber and opera singer

Alibek Dnishev Әлібек Дінішев
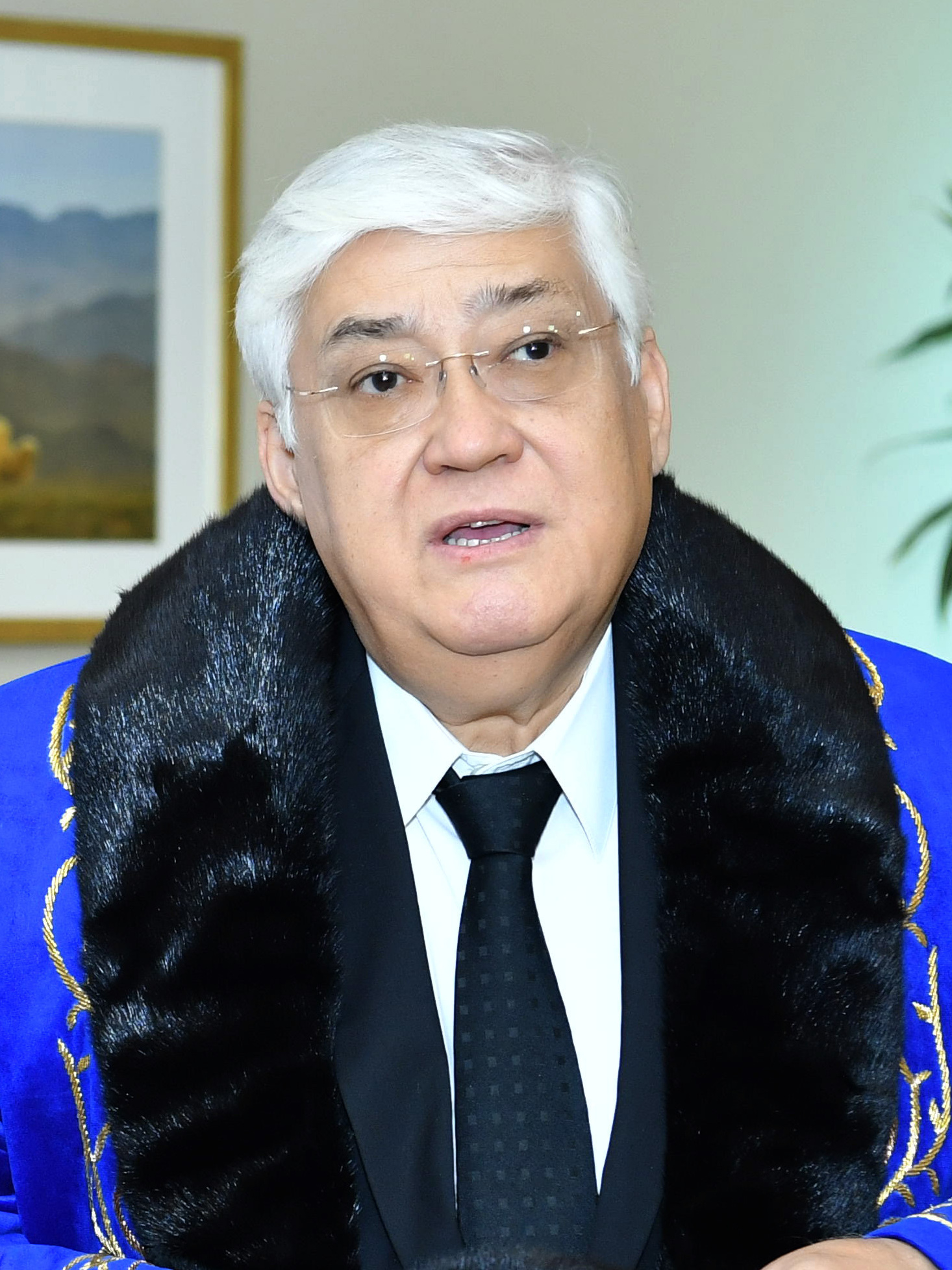
- Dnishev in 2021

Background information
- Born: 30 July 1951 (age 75); Almaty, Kazakh SSR, Soviet Union
- Genre: Classical
- Occupations: Singer, music teacher
- Instrument: Singing

Älıbek Mūsaūly Dınışev, (Note: Kazakh: Әлібек Мұсаұлы Дінішев; Russian: Алибек Мусаевич Днишев, romanized: Alibek Musayevich Dnishev) often Russified as Alibek Dnishev (born 30 July 1951), is a Soviet and Kazakh chamber and opera singer (tenor), educator. People's Artist of the USSR (1986). Hero of Labour of Kazakhstan (2021).

Laureate of Kazakhstan's First President and National Leader's State Award for Peace and Progress (2001), Laureate of the Republic of Kazakhstan's State Award for Literature and Arts (2012).

== Biography ==
Alibek Dnishev was born in Almaty on July 30, 1951. He was the fourth (and the youngest) son in a Kazakh-Tatar family.

Alibek dreamed of a performing career from an early age. A graduate of a music school (where he majored in accordion) and Tchaikovsky Alma-Ata Music Academy, Choral Conducting Dept., Alibek applied to Leningrad Conservatoire, but was not admitted, so he entered Nadia Sharipova's Vocal Performance Class at Kurmangazy Kazakh National Conservatoire. As a third-year student, he received his first prize for his rendition of I Remember the Wonderful Moment lieder at the Glinka All-Union Vocalist Contest in Tbilisi.

In early 1970s Alibek performed with Jetygen band, was a lead singer at Jambyl Kazakh State Philharmonic and Kazakh State Academic Opera and Ballet Theater named after Abay (Almaty). Dnishev took his lively concert programs to the largest halls of Algeria, Peru, Portugal, Finland, Sweden, Morocco and other countries. His European chamber concerts were fully sold out, he also performed in various plays of the Bolshoi Theater in Moscow.

Among opera classics, Dnishev performed arias from operas by Rimsky-Korsakov, Tchaikovsky and Alexander Borodin. For instance, his rendition of Lensky's aria is considered a benchmark for mastery and lyricism in the professional musical milieu.

He established and led Alibek Dnishev's Vocal Academy in 1997, which brought up talented performers of vocal art.

=== Family ===
His father, Musa Bukenbaevich Dnishev, was born in the settlement of Kaztalovka near the city of Uralsk (West Kazakhstan). He was a well-educated and genteel man. Before WW2 he worked in Leninshil Zhas newspaper and joined Kyzyl Armiya army newspaper when the war broke out. After WW2 he founded Madeniyet Zhane Turmys (Culture and Life republican magazine, now known as Parasat) and served as its Editor-in-Chief for many years.

His mother, Kamilya Abdullina, was the sister of well-known Kazakhstani opera singers, twins Rishat and Muslim Abdullin (both honored as People's Artistes of the USSR and Kazakh SSR).

His spouse, Marina Iskanderovna Dnisheva (Tynyshpaeva), a teacher of hearing impaired students, is granddaughter of Mukhamedzhan Tynyshpaev. She has two daughters.

== Career ==
Alibek Dnishev has a performing style characterized by style of lyricism and subtlety of voice. He is known for chamber music cycles and operas such as Dudaray (by Brusilovsky), Song of Virgin Soil (by Erkegali Rakhmadiyev), May Night (by Rimsky-Korsakov). He has performed roles of Lensky (Tchaikovsky's Evgeni Onegin), Vladimir (Borodin's Prince Igor), Aydar (Abay by Zhubanov and Khamidi), etc. Besides academic music, Alibek performs Kazakh folk songs, art songs and songs by Soviet composers, such as Matvey Blanters’ In the Forest by the Combat Line, There is No Better Color, Sad Willows, Unforgotten Song, Lullaby, In the City Garden, Moscow Windows, and Song of the Man in Love.

== Awards ==
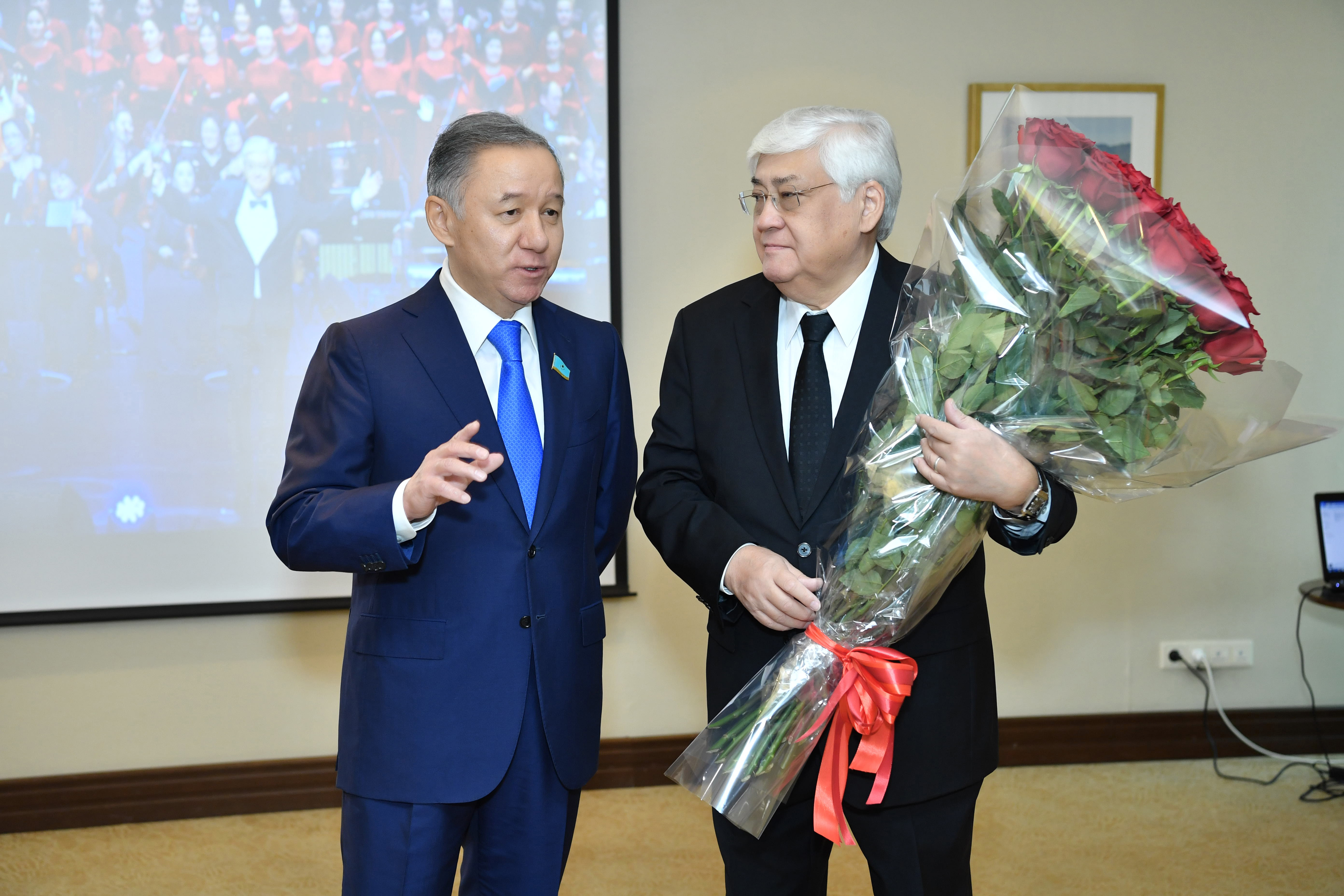
Dnishev (right) is greeted by Chairman of the Mäjilis Nurlan Nigmatulin, October 22, 2021

=== Orders ===
- Order of Parasat (1996);
- Order of Otan (2011).

=== Awards and honors ===
- People's Artist of the USSR (1986);
- Laureate of Glinka All-Union Vocalist Contest (1st Prize, 1975, Tbilisi, Georgia);
- Laureate of International Robert Schumann Competition (2nd Prize, 1977, Zwickau, GDR);
- Laureate of Villa-Lobos International Vocalist Competition (1979, Rio de Janeiro , Brazil);
- People's Artiste of Kazakh SSR (1979);
- Lenin Komsomol Award (1979) — for excellence in performance;
- Kazakhstan's First President and National Leader's State Award for Peace and Progress (2001);
- Republic of Kazakhstan's State Award for Literature and Arts (2012) — for the concert program for the 65th anniversary of the victory in the Great Patriotic War;
- Kazakhstannyn Embek Eri honor with a Gold Star — for outstanding contribution to the development of national culture and promotion of music arts and also on the occasion of the 70th anniversary (2021)
