= Diny Nurpeisovoy =

- Passing loop
- Interactive map of Diny Nurpeisovoy
- Country: Kazakhstan
- Region: Atyrau Region
- District: Kurmangazy District
- Time zone: UTC+5 (Central Asia Time)

Diny Nurpeisovoy (Kazakh: Дина Нұрпейісова, Dina Nūrpeiısova, from Russian: (разъезд) Дины Нурпеисовой, lit. '(siding of) Dina Nurpeisova') is a settlement serving a passing loop in Kurmangazy District, Atyrau Region of western Kazakhstan. It is named after Dina Nurpeisova, a Kazakh composer and dombura player. Population: 500 (2009 census results). In 1999, the settlement did not have steady population.

The settlement has a passing loop on the railway connecting Astrakhan and Atyrau. It is located in the extreme western part of the Region, close to the border with Russia.
