= Alley of Stars =

Alley of Stars may refer to:

- Alley of Stars of Kazakhstan, Almaty
- Alley of Stars of the Polish Song Festival, Opole, Poland
- Alley of Tatar Stars, Kazan, Russia

== See also ==
- Hollywood Walk of Fame, the first venue with stars for "stars"
- Star Square (Moscow)
- Birmingham Walk of Stars
