= Gulfairus Mansurovna Ismailova =

Soviet and Kazakh actress and artist

Gulfairus Ismailova
- Гүлфайрус Ысмайылова
- Born: December 15, 1929; Alma-Ata, Kazakh SSR, Soviet Union
- Died: May 12, 2013 (aged 83); Almaty, Kazakhstan
- Education: Study Leningrad Institute of Painting, Sculpture and Architecture

Gulfairus Mansurovna Ismailova (Kazakh: Гүлфайрус Мәнсүрқызы Ысмайылова, romanized: Gülfairus Mänsürqyzy Ysmaiylova; December 15, 1929 – May 12, 2013) was a Soviet and Kazakh artist, actress, People's Artist of Kazakhstan, Honored Worker of the Arts of the Kazakh SSR.

== Biography ==
Gulfairus Ismailova was born in 1929 in Alma-Ata; her real name being Kulpash Tansykbaevna Konarbaeva. Mansur Ismailov adopted Gulfairus in her early childhood, and she became the eldest of his five children. In 1949 she graduated from the Almaty Art College, where she studied in the workshop of the national artist of the Kazakh SSR A. M. Cherkassky. In 1956 Ismailova graduated from the Leningrad Institute of Painting, Sculpture, and Architecture named after Ilya Repin, according to the painting class of M. P. Bobyshev.

- In 1956-1957 she taught at the Almaty Art College.
- In 1971-1974 she worked as the leading artist of the Kazakh Opera and Ballet Theater. She created sketches for the scenery and costumes of operas: “Er Targyn” by E. Brusilovsky (1967), “Zhumbak Kyz” S. Mukhamedzhanova (1972), “Chio-Cio-San” by J. Puccini (1972), to the ballets “Dear Friendship "N. Tlendieva (1957) and" Kamar Sulu "by V. Velikanov (1958), the film" Kyz Zhibek "(1969-1971).
- Since 1957 a member of the Union of Artists of Kazakhstan.
- In the early 1970s, she became the leading artist of the Kazakh State Opera and Ballet Theater. Abay. She died in 2013 in Almaty.

== Artistic works ==
- Performance "Akbope" (Youth Theater, 1957),
- Friendship Ballet (1958),
- Opera "Er-Targyn" (1967),
- The ballet "Goats-Corps - Bayan-Sulu" (1971-1972),
- Opera "Zhumbak Kyz" (1972),
- Opera "Cio-Cio-San" (1972-1973),
- Opera "Alpamys" (1973, 1979),
- Opera "Aida" (1978) and others.

=== Movie roles ===
- “Kyz-Zhibek” (1971) - Aygoz, mother of Zhibek
- "Botagoz" (1957) - Botagoz
- “Alitet Goes to the Mountains” (1949) - Tygren

=== Paintings ===
- "Portrait of the People's Artist of the Kazakh SSR Shara Zhienkulova" (1958),
- "Portrait of the People's Artist of the Kazakh SSR Sholpan Dzhandarbekova" (1960),
- “Portrait of Kulyash Baiseitova” (1962),
- “Portrait of Dina Nurpeisova” (1965),
- Triptych "Folk craftswoman" (1967),
- Kazakh valse
- "Portrait of A. Kasteev" (1967),
- "Portrait of M. Auezov" (1969),
- “Portrait of S. Mukanov” (1969),
- Self Portrait with the Family (1978)

== Awards ==
- 1958 - Order of the Badge of Honor (USSR)
- 1965 - Honored Artist of the Kazakh SSR
- 1970 - Medal "In commemoration of the 100th anniversary of the birth of Vladimir Ilyich Lenin"
- 1981 - Order of Friendship of Peoples (USSR)
- 1987 - Medal "Veteran of Labor" (USSR)
- 1987 - People's Artist of the Kazakh SSR
- 1999 - Order "Parasat" of the Republic of Kazakhstan
- 2002 - Tarlan Award for Contribution to Art
- 2009 - Order "Dostyk" I degree RK
