= State Anthem of the Republic of Kazakhstan =

Qazaqstan Respublikasynyñ Memlekettık änūrany
English: State Anthem of the Republic of Kazakhstan
- Қазақстан Республикасының Мемлекеттік әнұраны
- Former national anthem of Kazakhstan
- Lyrics: Mūzafar Älımbaev et al., 1992
- Music: Mūqan Tölebaev et al., 1945
- Adopted: 1991
- Relinquished: 2006
- Preceded by: Anthem of the Kazakh Soviet Socialist Republic
- Succeeded by: Menıñ Qazaqstanym

Audio sample
- Instrumental version: file; help

Vocal

The former State Anthem of the Republic of Kazakhstan (Note: Kazakh: Қазақстан Республикасының Мемлекеттік әнұраны, romanized: Qazaqstan Respublikasynyñ Memlekettık änūrany, قازاقستان رەسپۋبلىيكاسىنىڭ مەملەكەتتئك أنۇرانى, pronounced [qɑzɑqsˈtɑn rʲesˌpublikɑsəˈnəŋ mʲemlʲekʲetˈtɘk ænʊrɑˈnə]) was used as the national anthem of Kazakhstan from 1991 to early 2006. Upon independence in December 1991, the melody of the anthem of the Kazakh Soviet Socialist Republic, composed by musicians Mūqan Tölebaev, Yevgeny Brusilovsky and Latif Hamidi, was retained; and new lyrics written by authors Mūzafar Älımbaev, Qadyr Myrza Älı, Tūmanbai Moldağaliev and Jadyra Därıbaeva were adopted in 1992. The lyrics were written by four people including poet Jadyra Därıbaeva (Жадыра Дәрібаева), one of only a handful of women to have ever been involved in writing a national anthem.

On 7 January 2006, it was officially replaced by "Menıñ Qazaqstanym", the country's current national anthem.

== Lyrics ==
Kazakh original

Cyrillic script

Жаралған намыстан қаһарман халықпыз,
Азаттық жолында жалындап жаныппыз.
Тағдырдың тезінен, тозақтың өзінен
Аман-сау қалыппыз, аман-сау қалыппыз.

Қайырмасы:
Еркіндік қыраны шарықта,
Елдікке шақырып тірлікте!
Алыптың қуаты — халықта,
Халықтың қуаты — бірлікте!

Ардақтап анасын, құрметтеп данасын,
Бауырға басқанбыз баршаның баласын.
Татулық, достықтың киелі бесігі —
Мейірбан Ұлы Отан, қазақтың даласы!

Қайырмасы

Талайды өткердік, өткенге салауат,
Тәуліктік сәулетті, келешек ғаламат!
Ар-ождан, ана тіл, өнеге-салтымыз,
Ерлік те, елдік те ұрпаққа аманат!

Қайырмасы

Latin script

Jaralğan namystan qaharman halyqpyz,
Azattyq jolynda jalyndap janyppyz.
Tağdyrdyñ tezınen, tozaqtyñ özınen
Aman-sau qalyppyz, aman-sau qalyppyz.

Qaiyrmasy:
Erkındık qyrany şaryqta,
Eldıkke şaqyryp tırlıkte!
Alyptyñ quaty – halyqta,
Halyqtyñ quaty – bırlıkte!

Ardaqtap anasyn, qūrmettep danasyn,
Bauyrğa basqanbyz barşanyñ balasyn.
Tatulyq, dostyqtyñ kielı besıgı –
Meiırban Ūly Otan, qazaqtyñ dalasy!

Qaiyrmasy

Talaidy ötkerdık, ötkenge salauat,
Täulıktık säulettı, keleşek ğalamat!
Ar-ojdan, ana tıl, önege-saltymyz,
Erlık te, eldık te ūrpaqqa amanat!

Qaiyrmasy

IPA transcription (Note: See Help:IPA/Kazakh and Kazakh phonology.)

[ʒɑ.rɑʟ̠ˈʁɑn nɑ.məsˈtʰɑn | qʰɑ.hɑrˈmɑn χɑˈɫəq.pʰəz |]
[ɑ.zɑtˈtʰəq ʒʷo.ɫənˈdɑ | ʒɑ.ɫənˈdɑp ʒɑˈnəp.pʰəz ‖]
[tʰɑʁ.dərˈdəŋ tʰʲe.zɪˈnʲen | tʰʷo.zɑqˈtʰəŋ ɥɵ.zɪˈnʲen |]
[ɑˈmɑn‿sɑw qʰɑˈɫəp.pʰəz | ɑˈmɑn‿sɑw qʰɑˈɫəp.pʰəz ‖]

[qʰɑ.jər.mɑˈsə]
[jer.kʰɪnˈdɪk qʰə.rɑˈnə | ʃɑ.rəqˈtʰɑ |]
[jel.dɪkˈkʰʲe ʃɑ.qʰəˈrəp tʰɪr.lɪkˈtʰʲe ‖]
[ɑ.ɫəpˈtʰəŋ qʰu.wɑˈtʰə χɑ.ɫəqˈtʰɑ |]
[χɑ.ɫəqˈtʰəŋ qʰu.wɑˈtʰə bɪr.lɪkˈtʰʲe ‖]

[ɑr.dɑqˈtʰɑp ɑ.nɑˈsən | qʰʊr.mʲetˈtʰʲep dɑ.nɑˈsən |]
[bɑ.wərˈʁɑ bɑsˈqʰɑn.bəz | bɑr.ʃɑˈnəŋ bɑ.ɫɑˈsən ‖]
[tʰɑ.tʰuˈɫəq dʷos.tʰəqˈtʰəŋ | kʰʲi.jeˈlɪ bʲe.sɪˈɣɪ |]
[mʲe.jɪrˈbɑn ʊˌɫə‿woˈtʰɑn | qʰɑ.zɑqˈtʰəŋ dɑ.ɫɑˈsə ‖]

[qʰɑ.jər.mɑˈsə]

[tʰɑ.ɫɑjˈdə ɥɵt.kʰʲerˈdɪk | ɥɵt.kʰʲenˈɡʲe sɑ.ɫɑˈwɑt |]
[tʰæɥ.lɪkˈtʰɪk sæɥ.lʲetˈtʰɪ | kʰʲe.lʲeˈʃʲek ʁɑ.ɫɑˈmɑt ‖]
[ɑr‿woʒˈdɑn ɑˈnɑ‿tʰɪl | ɥɵ.nʲeˈɣʲe sɑɫ.tʰəˈməz |]
[jerˈlɪk‿tʰʲe jelˈdɪk‿tʰʲe | ʊr.pʰɑqˈqʰɑ ɑ.mɑˈnɑt ‖]

[qʰɑ.jər.mɑˈsə]

English translation

We are the brave and proud people of Kazakhstan.
Fortune has favored us, we survived with our land.
We survived in our fight for freedoms light.
Coming out of the dark tyrant's hell, tyrant's hell.

Chorus:
Steppe Eagle, fly up high in the sky.
Call the people to life with your cry.
Our heroes come out of the people,
Whose strength is in their great unity.

Respecting the motherland, honoring the genius of the people,
In the hour of hard times, we have opened our arms to all.
The holy cradle of friendship and solidarity,
The Kazakh steppe — the beloved homeland!
Chorus

We've overcome the hardships, let the past serve bitter lesson
But today we face a radiant future.
Our mother tongue, tradition and sovereignty
We pass, as the mandate, to the next generations!

Chorus

== See also ==
- List of historical national anthems
