= Jumeken Najimedenov =

Kazakh poet

Jūmeken Sаbyrūly Näjımedenov (Kazakh: Жұмекен Сабырұлы Нәжімеденов; 28 November 1935 – 22 November 1983) was a Kazakh poet. He was born in Kurmangazy District in Atyrau Province, Kazakhstan.

In 1956, he wrote the lyrics of the Kazakh patriotic song "Menıñ Qazaqstanym" along with Şämşı Qaldaiaqov, who composed the music.

The song "Menıñ Qazaqstanym" was modified in 2006 by First Kazakh President Nursultan Nazarbayev, and has since become the current national anthem of the Republic of Kazakhstan.
