= Jambyl Kazakh State Philharmonic =

Kazakh creative association

Zhambyl Kazakh State Academic Philharmonic
- Жамбыл атындағы Қазақ мемлекеттік филармониясы
- Nickname: Zhambyl Philharmonic
- Named after: Zhambyl Zhabayuly
- Founded: 1935; 91 years ago
- Location: Almaty, Kazakhstan
- Website: jambyl-philharmonic.kz

The Kazakh state academic philharmonic named after Zhambyl (Kazakh: Жамбыл атындағы Қазақ мемлекеттік академиялық филармониясы, romanized: Jambyl atyndağy Qazaq memlekettık akademiialyq filarmoniiasy) is a creative association created on 14 January 1935 by the Decree of the Council of People's Commissars of the Kazakh SSR. It was originally organized by the Kazakh musicologist Akhmet Zhubanov as a regional art and concert organization. Since 1938, it bears the name of the famous Kazakh akyn Zhambyl Zhabayuly.

The Philharmonic holds the annual spring music festival Zhiger, Children's Music Week, concerts of national and symphonic music, lecture halls and other events.

== History ==
Initially, the philharmonic consisted of an ensemble of dombrists of 14 musicians, then an orchestra of folk instruments (named after Kurmangazy Sagyrbayuly since 1944), a national choir (transformed into a State Choral Chapel in 1939), a string quartet, the Kazakh-Russian song and dance ensemble "Zhetysu". In 1939, a symphony orchestra was organized under the direction of M. M. Ivanov-Sokolovsky and L. M. Shargorodsky.

Dina Nurpeisova, Amre Kashaubayev, Zhappas Kalambayev, Malik Zhappasbayev, Zhusupbek Yelebekov, Kosymzhan Babakov, Manarbek Yerzhanov, Zhamal Omarova, Shara Zhienkulova, Nursulu Tapalova, Bibigul Tulegenova, Nurgali Nusipzhanov and others contributed to the development of the Philharmonic.

In 1970-1980, Gulzhamilya Kadyrbekova, Zhania Aubakirova, Ayman Musakhodzhayeva, Gaukhar Myrzabekova, Galiya Moldakarimova and others performed on the stage of the Kazakh Philharmonic.

The laureate of All-Union competitions, the State Choral Chapel joined the Philharmonic in 1935, initially representing a small mixed choir led by composer Dmitry Matsutsin, and already in 1936 in Moscow the choir successfully organized a decade of Kazakhstani art. In February 1939, by a decree of the Government of the Kazakh SSR, the Philharmonic Choir was transformed into the State Choral Chapel.

In 1958, he joined the Philharmonic Society and began to introduce thousands of people to the live sound of symphonic music in its highest standards.

In 1982, on the initiative of the People's Artist of Kazakhstan and the USSR, laureate of the State Prize, Halyk kaharmany, kuishi-composer, conductor Tlendiev Nurgisa Atabaevich, the folklore and ethnographic orchestra "Otyrar sazy" was created. In 1999, the orchestra was named after N.Tlendiev, and in 2000 it received Academic status.

The first composition of the string quartet was created in 1988 at the Akhmet Zhubanov Republican Music School. Today's quartet consists of the fourth generation of musicians. The founder of the creative team is its artistic director, a laureate of national and international competitions, a cellist called Yernar Myntaev.

On September 21, 1990, the State Brass Band of the Republic of Kazakhstan was established under the leadership of Kanat Akhmetov. Conductors: Akhmetov Kanat Muginovich - Honored Worker of Kazakhstan, Recipient of the Order of "Kurmet", Belyakov Alexander Viktorovich - Honored Worker of Kazakhstan, recipient of the Order of «Kurmet», and Zhanat Abilkasymov.

The quintet of woodwind instruments was organized in 1997 by Honored Worker of Kazakhstan, laureate of international competitions, graduate of the European Academy of Music named after V.A. Mozart Zhanat Ermanov. The successful concert activity of the band was highly appreciated, and in 2004 the quintet joined the Kazakh State Academic Philharmonic named after Zhambyl.

In 2024, with the support of the Ministry of Culture and Information of the Republic of Kazakhstan, the State Quintet of Classical Guitarists was established at the Kazakh State Academic Philharmonic named after Zhambyl.

On December 6, 2023, by Decree of the Government of the Republic of Kazakhstan №1085, the Kazakh State Philharmonic named after Zhambyl received the status of "Academic".

The Kazakh State Academic Philharmonic named after Zhambyl annually holds the Republican festival ”Onerimiz sagan - Kazakhstan", the Republican competition of performers of traditional songs named after A. Kashaubayev, the Republican Competition of Conductors named after N. Tlendiev, the International Academy of Wind Instruments, the festival - concert of children's and youth choirs "Gul Almaty-Flower city", conducts an annual cycle of subscription and children's subscription concerts, musical concerts of national and symphonic music, lectures and other events.

== Collectives ==
Currently, the Philharmonic has 7 ensembles and soloists:

* Academic Folklore and Ethnographic Orchestra "Otyrar Sazy" named after N.Tlendiev;

* B. Baykadamov State Choral Chapel;

* T. Abdrashev State Academic Symphony Orchestra of the Republic of Kazakhstan;

* State Brass Band of the Republic of Kazakhstan;

* The State Quintet of Woodwind Instruments;

* G. Zhubanova State String Quartet.

* The State Quintet of Classical Guitarists.

== Building ==
The Philharmonic building was built from 1933 to 1936 as the Palace of Culture by Leningrad architects D. Fomin, E. Tseitlin, designer V. Railean. The artists E. Sidorkin and O. Bogomolov took part in the project. Up to the construction of the Palace of Sports. In the 50th Anniversary of October Revolution in 1967, the building remained the largest concert venue in the republic.

During World War II, the Central United Film Studio (TsOKS) was located here, which united the leading film studios of the country, where outstanding filmmakers worked: S. Eisenstein, the Vasilyev brothers, N. Cherkasov, B. Babochkin, M. Bernes, I. Pyriev, M. Zharov, G. Kozintsev, V. Maretskaya and others.

From 1983 to 1985, reconstruction was carried out according to the project of architects Y. Ratushny, T. Eraliev, O. Balykbaev, designer Zh. Syzdykov, after which the Kazakhconcert settled here. The auditorium, decorated with a portrait gallery of the founders of Kazakh music, is distinguished by its special acoustics.
