= Shara Zhienkulova =

Soviet actor (1912–1991)

Şara Jienqulova
- Шара Жиенқұлова
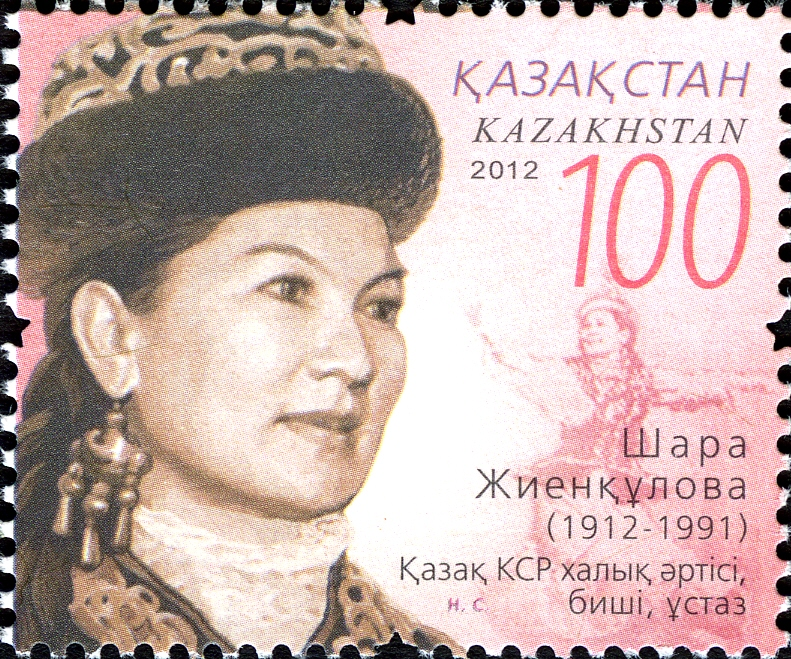
- 2012 Kazakh stamp depicting Jienqulova
- Born: 18 July 1912; Verny, Kazakh SSR
- Died: 21 May 1991 (aged 78); Almaty, Kazakh SSR, Soviet Union
- Education: Abai Kazakh National Pedagogical University
- Occupation: Dancer
- Years active: 1928
- Partner: Qurmanbek Jandarbekov
- Children: Bolat Jandarbekov
- Awards: Order of the Red Banner of Labour (2); Order of Lenin; Order of the Badge of Honour

Gülşara Jienqūlova (Note: Often transliterated as Gulshara Zhienkulova through a Russified Romanization of Гульшара Жиенкулова.) (Kazakh: Гүлшара Жиенқұлова, Kazakh pronunciation: [gʏlʂɑˈrɑ ʐɘjenˈqo̙ɫɯvɑ]), known professionally as Şara Jienqūlova (later married as Jandarbekova; 18 July 1912 – 21 May 1991), was a Soviet Kazakh dancer, educator, and People's Artiste of the Kazakh SSR (1938).

== Biography ==
Gulshara Zhienkulova was born in the town of Verny (present-day Almaty) on August 18, 1912. She studied history at Kazakh Pedagogical Institute (current Abai Kazakh National Pedagogical University) in 1929–1930.

Zhienkulova's primary mentor was Alexander Alexandrov, an experienced theatrical ballet master, a former soloist of the Bolshoi Theatre. He provided her with a solid foundation in Russian classical dance and consistently emphasized the importance of national character in art. Their collaborative work resulted in Tattimbet, which is still considered one of the best Kazakh dances.

Pulysh in the play Maidan (Battle) by B. Mailin was Shara's first role in Auezov Theater. She also performed the roles of Enlik and Karagoz in Enlik-Kebek and Karagoz plays by Mukhtar Auezov, and others.

In 1934, Zhienkulova joined the theater of drama and music now known as The Kazakh National Opera and Ballet Theatre named after Abay) where she performed folk dances in Auezov's musical drama Ayman-Sholpan, as well as operas Kyz-Zhibek, Zhalbyr and Er Targhin by Yevgeny Brusilovsky. Shara graced Kalkaman-Mamyr, the first Kazakh national ballet, as Mamyr in 1938. She also performed as Balym in the sound movie Amangeldy produced by the Kazakhstani filmmakers the same year. Together with ballet master Leonid Zhukov, Shara Zhienkulova staged a ballet called Koktem (Spring) by Ivan Nadirov in 1940.

She worked at Jambyl Kazakh State Philharmonic for over 20 years and led the Kazakh SSR Song and Dance Company. She served as the director of Almaty Choreographic College from 1966 until 1975.

To develop national dance art, Zhienkulova traveled extensively across auls, studying ancient rituals, national costumes, traditions and cultural heritage of her people. She created such unforgettable dances as Tattimbet, Ayzhan Kyz, Kara Jorga and Kyryk Kyz.

When the folk department of the Almaty Choreographic College opened in 1965, she placed Kazakh dance on a professional footing with her own teaching methodologies.

Shara Zhienkulova has been called a diamond of musical and plastic arts. Gulfairus Ismailova painted Kazakh Waltz for her. It is also the name of one of Zhienkulova's most famous productions, set to the music by Khamidi. Kazakh Waltz was first performed during the 10-day Festival of Kazakh Literature and Arts in the Bolshoi in Moscow in 1968 by an all-female group of dancers and was later showcased in the Soviet Union and abroad.

Shara Zhienkulova died on May 21, 1991, 40 days after the death of her son Bulat Dzhandarbekov, she was buried next to him in the Kensai cemetery in Almaty.

== Filmography ==
Year	Title	Original title		
Year	Title	Original title	Actor	Notes
1939	Amangeldy (film)	Амангельды	Balim	
1954	Daughter of the Steppes (film)	Дочь степей	Gyulsara	
1957	Our dear doctor (film)	Наш милый доктор	choreographer	

== Family ==
Shara was the first wife of opera singer Kurmanbek Dzhandarbekov. She later got briefly married to pilot Zholdasbek Nurymov.

Bulat Dzhandarbekov, her son from the first marriage, was a writer, the author of the historical dilogy The Sakas (Tomiris, The Feat of Shirak).

== Awards and honours ==
- Order of the Badge of Honour (May 26, 1936)
- Order of the Red Banner of Labour (August 17, 1982)
- Order of the Red Banner of Labour (December 27, 1972)
- Order of Lenin (January 3, 1959) awarded for her outstanding contributions to the development of Kazakh art and literature, and in connection with the 10-day Festival of Kazakh Art and Literature in Moscow
- Honored Artist of the Kazakh SSR (1936)
- People's Artist of the Kazakh SSR (1938)
- State Prize of the Kazakh SSR (1968)

== Legacy ==
- A street in Kazakhstan's capital city of Astana is named after Shara Zhienkulova.
- On October 17, 2012, a commemorative stamp was issued as part of the Milestones, Jubilees and Holidays series to mark the 100th anniversary of Shara Zhienkulova, dancer, teacher, and People's Artist of the Kazakh SSR.
