= Anthem of the Kazakh Soviet Socialist Republic =

Qazaq SSR-nyñ memlekettık änūrany
English: State Anthem of the Kazakh SSR
- Қазақ ССР-ның мемлекеттік әнұраны
- Sheet music
- Former regional anthem of the Kazakh SSR
- Lyrics: Abdilda Tazhibaev et al.
- Music: Yevgeny Brusilovsky et al.
- Adopted: 1945
- Readopted: 1956
- Relinquished: 1991
- Succeeded by: Anthem of the Republic of Kazakhstan (1991–2006)

Audio sample
- Vocal rendition in A-flat major: file; help

Instrumental
Recording by the United States Navy Band

Instrumental
Recording by the Brass Band of the USSR Ministry of Defence in 1968

The State Anthem of the Kazakh Soviet Socialist Republic (Note: Kazakh: Қазақ Кеңес Социалистік Республикасының мемлекеттік әнұраны, romanized: Qazaq Keñeş Socialistık Respublikasynyñ memlekettık änūrany, pronounced [qʰɑˈzɑq kʰʲeŋˈʲeʃ sət͡sɨɐlʲɪsˈtɘk rʲesˈpublʲɪkəsəˌnəŋ mʲemlʲekʰʲetˈtʰɘk ænʊrɑˈnə]) was the anthem of Kazakhstan when it was a constituent republic of the Soviet Union.

== Background ==
The music was composed by Mukan Tölebaev, Russian composer Yevgeny Brusilovsky and Tatar composer Latıf Hamıdı, with lyrics written by Kazakh authors Äbdilda Täjibaev, Qaiym Muhamedhanov and Ğabıt Müsirepov. The Soviet-era lyrics were removed after the Kazakh SSR was renamed the Republic of Kazakhstan on 10 December 1991, In 1992, new lyrics were adopted with the same melody as the anthem of independent Kazakhstan, until 7 January 2006.

From 1991 to 1997, it was one of the five remaining republics that appreciated its old anthem, then from 1997 to 2000, it became one of four (when Turkmenistan changed its anthem). From 2000 to 2006, it is one of the five remaining again (when Russia changed its anthem). It is the only SSR anthem played in 3/4, with the majority of others using 4/4.

== Lyrics ==
After Stalin's death in 1953, Nikita Khrushchev then came into power and established nationwide de-Stalinisation policies. The lyrics of the State Anthem of the Kazakh Soviet Socialist Republic would later be revised, per de-Stalinisation.

In the last line of the final stanza in the lyrics, the word Stalin (Сталин) would be replaced with Party (Партия) – in reference to the Communist Party of the Soviet Union, the official ruling party of the Soviet Union.

Kazakh (Cyrillic)

Біз қазақ ежелден еркіндік аңсаған,
Бостандық өмір мен ар үшін қиған жан.
Торлаған тұманнан жол таппай тұрғанда,
Жарқырап Лениндей күн жығып, атты таң.

Қайырмасы:
Жасасын Советтер (Note: After independence, the Kazakh translation of the word Soviet(s) is officially Кеңес(тер)» Keñes(ter) [kʰʲeŋʲes(ˈtʰʲer)].) Одағы,
Жеткізген еркіндік, теңдікке,
Бастайтын елдерді бірлікке,
Жеңіске, шаттыққа, ерлікке!

Дақ салмай Лениннің жеңімпаз салтына,
Ұрпағы қосты даңқ Оттаның даңқына,
Одақтас, ұрандас елдердің қамқоры,
Көп алғыс айтамыз ұлы орыс халқына.

Қайырмасы:
Жасасын Советтер Одағы,
Жеткізген еркіндік, теңдікке,
Бастайтын елдерді достыққа,
Жеңіске, шаттыққа, ерлікке!

Іргелі мемлекет, ерікті болдық ел,
Достықпен, бірлікпен жайнайды туған жер.
Еңбекте, майданда, жеткізген жеңіске
Данышпан Партия (Note: «Сталин» (Stalin) was originally used in the Stalinist version.) – сүйікті кемеңгер.

Қайырмасы:
Жасасын Советтер Одағы,
Жеткізген еркіндік, теңдікке,
Бастайтын елдерді бақытқа,
Жеңіске, шаттыққа, ерлікке!

Kazakh (Latin)

Bız qazaq ejelden erkındık añsağan,
Bostandyq ömır men ar üşın qiğan jan.
Torlağan tūmannan jol tappai tūrğanda,
Jarqyrap Lenindei kün jyğyp, atty tañ.

Qaiyrmasy:
Jasasyn Sovetter Odağy,
Jetkızgen erkındık, teñdıkke,
Bastaityn elderdı bırlıkke,
Jeñıske, şattyqqa, erlıkke!

Daq salmai Leninnıñ jeñımpaz saltyna,
Ūrpağy qosty dañq Ottanyñ dañqyna,
Odaqtas, ūrandas elderdıñ qamqory,
Köp alğys aitamyz ūly orys halqyna.

Qaiyrmasy:
Jasasyn Sovetter Odağy,
Jetkızgen erkındık, teñdıkke,
Bastaityn elderdı dostyqqa,
Jeñıske, şattyqqa, erlıkke!

Irgelı memleket, erıktı boldyq el,
Dostyqpen, bırlıkpen jainaidy tuğan jer.
Eñbekte, maidanda, jetkızgen jeñıske
Danyşpan Partia – süıktı kemeñger.

Qaiyrmasy:
Jasasyn Sovetter Odağy,
Jetkızgen erkındık, teñdıkke,
Bastaityn elderdı baqytqa,
Jeñıske, şattyqqa, erlıkke!

IPA transcription (Note: See Kazakh phonology and Help:IPA/Kazakh.)

[bɘz qʰɑˈzɑq je.ʒʲelˈdʲen | jer.kʰɘnˈdɘk ɑɴ.sɑˈʁɑn |]
[bʷos.tʰɑnˈdəq ɥɵˈmɘr mʲen | ɑr‿ʉˈʃɘn qʰɨˈʁɑn ʒɑn ǁ]
[tʰʷor.ɫɑˈʁɑn tʰʊ.mɑnˈnɑn | ʒʷoɫ tʰɑpˈpʰɑj tʰʊr.ʁɑnˈdɑ |]
[ʒɑr.qʰəˈrɑp ˈlʲe.nin.dʲej | kʰʉn ʒəˈʁəp ɑtˈtʰə tʰɑŋ ǁ]

[qʰɑ.jər.mɑˈsə]
[ʒɑˈsɑ.sən sʷo.vʲetˈtʰʲer wo.dɑˈʁə |]
[ʒʲet.kʰɘzˈgʲen jer.kʰɘnˈdɘk | tʰʲeŋ.dɘkˈkʰʲe |]
[bɑs.tʰɑjˈtʰən jel.dʲerˈdɘ bɘr.lɘkˈkʰʲe |]
[ʒʲeŋ.ɘsˈkʰʲe ʃɑt.tʰəqˈqʰɑ jer.lɘkˈkʰʲe ǁ]

[dɑq sɑɫˈmɑj lʲe.ninˈnɘŋ | ʒʲeŋ.ɘmˈpʰɑz sɑɫ.tʰəˈnɑ |]
[ʊr.pʰɑˈʁə qʰʷosˈtʰə dɑɴq | wot.tʰɑˈnəŋ dɑɴ.qʰəˈnɑ |]
[wo.dɑqˈtʰɑs ʊ.rɑnˈdɑs | jel.dʲerˈdɘŋ qʰɑm.qʰʷoˈrə |]
[kʰᶣɵp ɑɫˈʁəs ɑjˈtʰɑ.məz | ʊˌɫə‿woˈrəs χɑɫ.qʰəˈnɑ ǁ]

[qʰɑ.jər.mɑˈsə]
[ʒɑˈsɑ.sən sʷo.vʲetˈtʰʲer wo.dɑˈʁə |]
[ʒʲet.kʰɘzˈgʲen jer.kʰɘnˈdɘk | tʰʲeŋ.dɘkˈkʰʲe |]
[bɑs.tʰɑjˈtʰən jel.dʲerˈdɘ dʷos.tʰəqˈqʰɑ |]
[ʒʲeŋ.ɘsˈkʰʲe ʃɑt.tʰəqˈqʰɑ jer.lɘkˈkʰʲe ǁ]

[ɘr.gʲeˈlɘ mʲem.lʲeˈkʰʲet | je.rɘkˈtʰɘ bʷoɫˈdəq jel |]
[dʷosˈtʰəq.pʰʲen bɘrˈlɘk.pʰʲen | ʒɑj.nɑjˈdə tʰuˈʁɑn ʒʲer ǁ]
[jeŋ.bʲekˈtʰʲe mɑj.dɑnˈdɑ | ʒʲet.kʰɘzˈgʲen ʒʲeŋ.ɘsˈkʰʲe |]
[dɑ.nəʃˈpʰɑn ˈpʰɑr.tʰi.jɑ | sʉ.jɘkˈtʰɘ kʰʲe.mʲeŋˈgʲer ǁ]

[qʰɑ.jər.mɑˈsə]
[ʒɑˈsɑ.sən sʷo.vʲetˈtʰʲer wo.dɑˈʁə |]
[ʒʲet.kʰɘzˈgʲen jer.kʰɘnˈdɘk | tʰʲeŋ.dɘkˈkʰʲe |]
[bɑs.tʰɑjˈtʰən jel.dʲerˈdɘ bɑ.qʰətˈqʰɑ |]
[ʒʲeŋ.ɘsˈkʰʲe ʃɑt.tʰəqˈqʰɑ jer.lɘkˈkʰʲe ǁ]

English translation

We, olden Kazakhs, seeking liberty,
Sacrificing our lives for honour and glory.
Traversing the desolate fog of darkness,
Yet forth Lenin came and morning rose upon us.

Chorus:
Long live the Soviet Union,
To liberty and equality.
For the unity of our country,
To victory, joy and bravery!

Lenin's victorious path shall never fade,
Our future's glory shall in our land spread.
To the protector of the Union's republics,
We all thank the mighty Russian folks.

Chorus:
Long live the Soviet Union,
To liberty and equality.
For the amity of our country,
To victory, joy and bravery!

We have become a country strong and free,
Where friendship and unity have been established.
Lead us to triumph in war and toil,
O wise Party – you are truly loved.

Chorus:
Long live the Soviet Union,
To liberty and equality.
For the happiness of our country,
To victory, joy and bravery!
