= Kui (music) =

Kipchak instrumental musical composition

A kui (Kazakh: күй), also spelled küy, is a Kipchak instrumental musical composition that is usually sung to the accompaniment of traditional Kazakh plucked, bowed, and wind instruments such as the dombyra, qobyz, syrnai, jetigen, tsuur, although the Kazakh dombyra and the Kyrgyz komuz (both long-necked lutes) are most frequently used. In the 20th century, Kazakh Soviet musicians experimented with choral arrangements of kuis.

== Kui in Kazakh culture performed with dombyra ==
In Kazakh culture kuis were learned by heart and passed from generation to generation without written fixation. For example, Kazakh folk Kui “aqsaq qulan” (lame onager) is dated to the 13th century. Authors of many Kazakh kuis lived in the Middle Ages. But the pick of the culture is from the 19th and 20th centuries. Kui tradition included also verbal part that explained in detail the story for its compositions, personalities, reasons and legends. Before performing the kui, the performer used to give a story about the composition to play, so the auditory could get proper feelings. But by the time the verbal tradition for kuis was finally separated from instrumental performances and only few kuishi (performer of kui) still keep this part of the tradition.

== Ancient composers of kuis ==
Dombyra Kuis were formed in the result of centuries-old folk instrumental performance tradition. There are many outstanding middle age musicians in Kazakh history:

- Sypyra-Zhyrau (14th century)
- Qaztugan or Abulqadir (15th century)
- Asanqaigy (14th-15th centuries)
- Baizhigit (15th-16th centuries)

But the peak of the culture was achieved by the middle of 19th century. Then very many composers lived who created kuis:

- Kurmangazy Sagyrbaev (1823–1889)
- Makhambet Otemisuly (Utemisov, 1803–1846)
- Dauletkerei Shygauly (Shygaev, 1821–1875)
- Tattimbet Qazangapuly (Kazangapov, 1817–1862)
- Abyl Taraquly, (Taraqov, 1820–1892)
- Esbai (1810–1901)
- Qazangap (1854–1921)
- Toqa Shonmanuly (Shonmanov, 1830–1904) and others

The female composer Dina Nurpeisqyzy, or Dina Nurpeisova (1861–1955) also began then her career.

== Types of kui ==
There are both folk kuis and kuis composed by authors. It is said that folks kuis may take their beginning from ritual worship acts of nomad tribes. Every kuishi (performer of kui) had his own unique technique and features.

The themes of kuis are very different: from philosophic thoughts to the wildness of nature. For example, Dauletkerei's kui, "Zhiger", which means “Energy to Live” or Qazangap's Kui “Kokil” which means “Melody of my Soul”; Osen Tore's Kui, “Ottin Dunie, Kettin Dunie” which means “My Days Have Passed”. Other kuis represent detailed psychological portraits of individuals (Qurmangazy's Kui “Toremurat” – the name of a male person; Mamen's Kui “Aqsholpan” which is the name of a woman; Dina's “Asem Qonyr”). Other kuis are about mother land – vast fields of steppe: Qurmangazy's kui "Sary Arqa" which means “Golden Steppe”; Tattimbet's kui “Sarzhailau” – "Golden Plateau"; Bogda's kui “Zhem Suynyn Tasqyny” means “Flood of the Zhem River”.

The other part of kuis is dedicated to events in the lives of kuishis or composers. (Qurmangazy's Kui “Aman Bol Sheshem, Aman Bol” means "Take Care, Mama, Take Care"; Tattimbet's Kui “Kokei Kesti”, or internal disturbance; Dina's “Qaraqasqa At” means a dark horse with white spot on its head.

Another group of kuis is dedicated to the birds and animals: folks’ “Bozingen” means white female camel, Telkqonyr-which is the name of a horse; Ashimtai's “Qonyr Qaz” means “Brown Goose”; Sugir's Kui “Aqqu” means “White Wwan”. Nomads expressed the environment of their daily life very thoroughly through kuis.

== Kui tradition ==
There are two musical types of Kuis; tokpe kuis (prevail in Western Kazakhstan) and shertpe kuis (Eastern, Southern and Central Kazakhstan). Shertpe kui differs from tokpe kui in the sense of the theme, forms, and performance. Western tokpe kuis reflect dramatic events, give very strong aggressive associations. These are composed according to its rules – a certain sequence of tone sets on the Dombyra neck.

Shertpe kuis do not have such rules for composing. They are very melodic and seem to be a soundtrack for songs. They are free in the style and give very deep, gentle and soft associations.

The most prominent composers of tokpe kKuis are Qurmangazy, Dauletkerey, Qazangap, Abyl, Esir, Esbay, Dina, and Seitek. The biggest figure in kui tradition is Qurmangazy from the Western school of kui tradition. He created the biggest hits among kui compositions. Shertpe tradition is represented by Baizhigit, Tattimbet, Toqa, Dairabai, Sugur, Ryzdyq, Abiken, Tolegen and many others.
