= Kara Jorga =

Kazakh folk dance

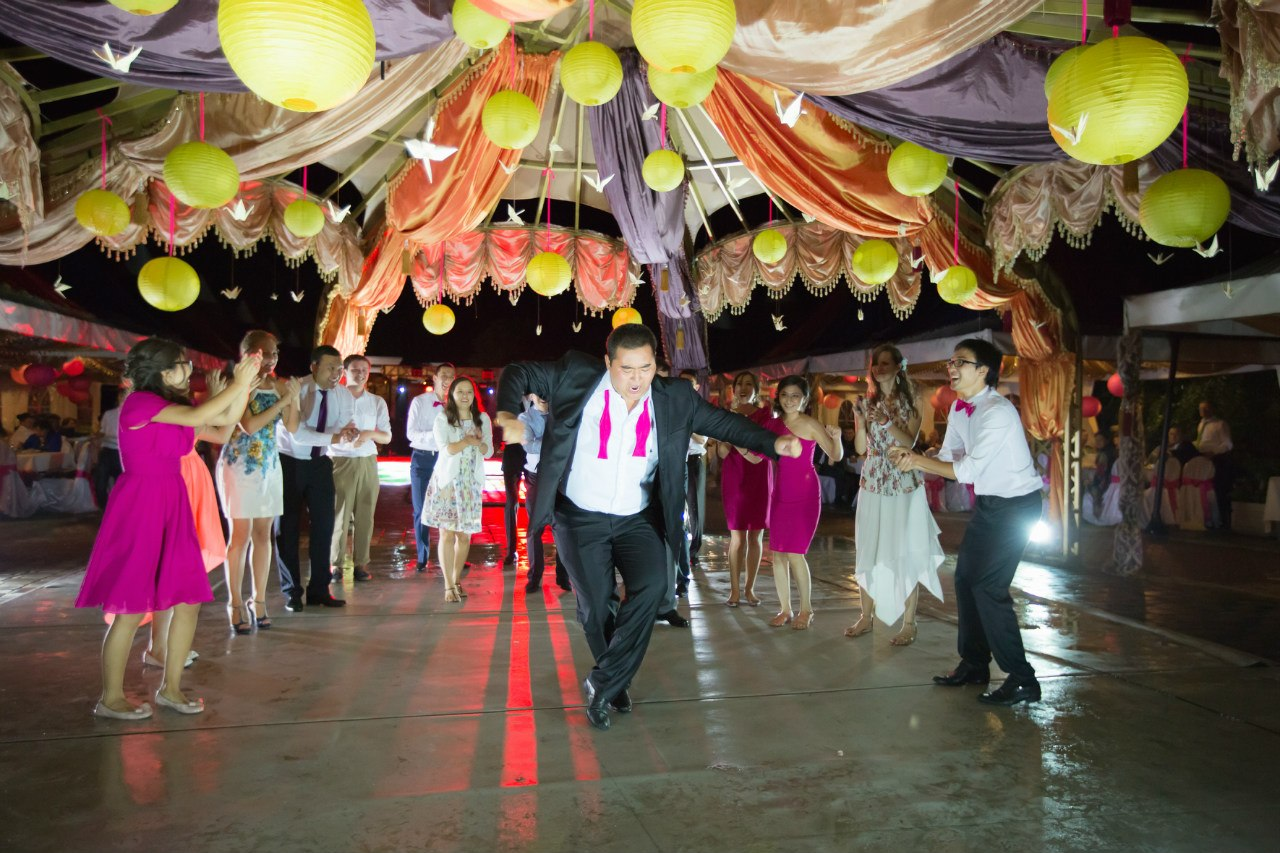
Kara Zhora

Kara Jorga or Kara Zhorga (Kazakh: Qara jorğa - "Black Ambler") is a traditional Kazakh instrumental song (kui) and dance depicting a horse that uses an ambling gait. Along with other nomadic dances, the Kara Zhorga dance (Black pacer) connected to animalistic symbolism and Tengrianism. The dance can be performed with other instrumental songs (kui), however, Kara Jorga became most popular among Kazakh and then Kyrgyz people. Similar dance moves are also native to Mongolian people.

During the Soviet period, as a consequence of Kazakh famine, collectivization and urbanization, Kara Jorga song and dance were almost lost and became subjects for research and experimental elements for Kazakh ballet. However, these traditions were preserved by Kazakh who survived famine by fleeing to China in the early 20th century, which was reported by National Geographic reporters in the 1950s of the 20th century. It was then popularized in Kazakhstan since the post-independence period, mostly by Kazakh repatriates from China and Turkey, such as Arystan Shadetuly – a professional Kara Jorga dancer. The first music video released by Kazakhs in China in 2009. Several flash mobs were staged both in China and Kazakhstan. The largest Kara Jorga dance was achieved in Astana by 399 performers on 16 December 2011.

== Etymology ==
The word "kara" has different meanings in Kazakh, starting from black to simple, strong or resistant. "Jorga" means the ambling pace of a horse's walk. Thus, it could be translated both as strong pacer and black pacer. Kara Jorga horses are mostly used for long journeys. Horses were treated as a totemic animal among Kazakhs and proto-Kazakh Turkic tribes. Rakhimzhanova, Aray (2015). Qara Jorga in Process of Transformation from Local Knowledge to National Symbol (master thesis). Nazarbayev University.

The dance also has another name, such as "buwıyn biyi" (dance of joints), because it is based on rhythmic moves of shoulder and hand joints.

== History ==
Kara Jorga like other nomadic dances related to traditional pastoral culture, was used during Kazakh festivals and shamanic rituals before the Islamic period.

Some elements of Kara Jorga displayed in 1933 in Almaty on a ballet stage by Ali Ardobus. A full dance was staged in the Kazakh Drama Theatre during the Kazakh Enlik-Kebek poem play in 1936.

Later, prominent Kazakh-Soviet choreographers Dauren Abirov, Aubakir Ismailov and Sara Zhienkulova developed staged dances on the basis of recorded or observed Kazakh folk dances, such as Kara Jorga. Thus, in Kazakhstan, Kara Jorga was preserved as a professional choreographic art, while Kazakhs in China have been practicing it casually during the different events as a folk dance. Kara Jorga became popular in Kazakhstan in the 2000s with the rise of national identity. It also turned into a popular cultural marker of the Kazakh diaspora.

In 2013, Kara Jorga dance was nominated for UNESCO Intangible Cultural Heritage Lists.
