= Alley of Stars of Kazakh Cinema =

Landmark in Almaty, Kazakhstan

The Alley of Stars of Kazakh Cinema was unveiled in 2011 within the territory of Kazakhfilm studio, Almaty, Kazakhstan. The event occurred during the VII Eurasia International Film Festival and also associated with the 70th anniversary of Kazakfilm.

The list of persons with the first stars included Шакен Айманов, Султан-Ахмет Ходжиков, Мажит Бегалин, Абдулла Карсакбаев, Сералы Кожамкулов, Калибек Куанышбаев, Амина Умурзакова, Ануар Молдабеков, Идрис Ногайбаев, Нурмухан Жантурин, Кененбай Кожабеков.

Not only Kazakh nationals have their stars there. In particular, there is the star for Sergey Eisenstein, who was evacuated to Almaty during World War II and shot the first part of the film Ivan the Terrible at the studio then known as Центральная Объединённая киностудия художественных фильмов (which was the merger of the Almaty studio and Mosfilm and Lenfilm evacuated to Almaty).

The event included the presentation of the "Encyclopedia of Cinema of Kazakhstan".

In 2000 the first attempt was made to establish the Alley of Stars in Almaty, near the Palace of the Republic. Eventually this alley had become neglected and was dismantled in 2011.

A similar Alley of Stars was established in 2007 in Karaganda, for various workers of culture, near the monument "Miner's Glory". A star per year was supposed to be installed. The first star was installed for Bibigul Tulegenova, followed by Roza Rymbayeva, Dos Mukasan band, and Kayrat Baybosynov. This tradition was neglected as well. In 2014 the tradition was restored and the star for Yeskendir Khasangaliyev was installed.
