= Roza Rymbayeva =

Roza Rymbayeva Роза Рымбаева
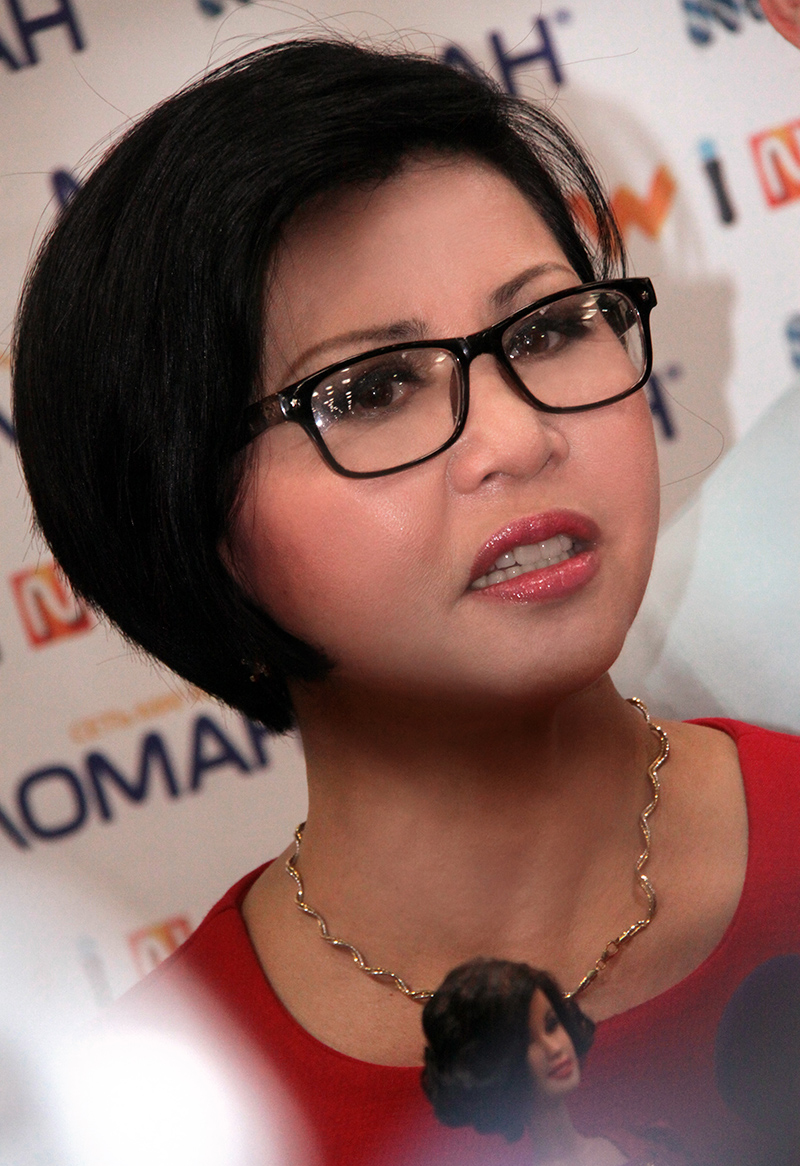
- Born: Roza Kuanyshkyzy Rymbayeva; 28 October 1957 (age 68)
- Occupations: Singer, professor, actress, television presenter, model
- Years active: 1975–present
- Awards: Order of Friendship (Kazakhstan, 2nd class, 2016); Order of Parasat (Kazakhstan, 2000); Order of Kurmet (Kazakhstan, 2004); Order of Friendship of Peoples (USSR, 1991); Golden Orpheus (Grand Prix, 1977)
- Musical career
- Genres: Pop; Dance; Jazz; Synth-pop; Folk; Romance
- Instrument: Vocals

Roza Kuanyshkyzy Rymbayeva (Kazakh: Роза Қуанышқызы Рымбаева, Roza Quanyşqyzy Rymbaeva; born 1957) is a Soviet and Kazakh singer, the people's artist of the Kazakh Soviet Socialist Republic (1986).

== Biography ==
Rosa Rymbayeva was born on 28 October 1957 at the Zhangiz-Tobe station in the East Kazakhstan Province to a family of railway workers. She graduated from the faculty musical-dramatic comedy of theatrical-artistic institute in Almaty (1984). From 1976 to 1979, she was a soloist in the republican youth-pop band "Gulder" ("Flowers"), and from 1979 in a pop band "Arai", managed by her husband T. Okapov. Since 1979, a soloist of Kazakhconcert, the main republican concert. She also combines as a teacher of Republic pop-circus college. The winner of various international contests of pop singers (1977 Sopot, Bulgaria: Golden Orpheus, 1979, Istanbul, Turkey). The winner of grand-prix of "Gala-83" international contest in Cuba. Her repertoire includes songs of Kazakh and foreign composers, along with the works of modern composers performs national songs in a peculiar interpretation. For the moment she sums up her 25-year career of singer, arranges her own jubilee concerts, but Roza Rymbayeva is not going to leave stage. "I have sung so many songs in my 25-year career, that I can't place all of them into my concert program" she says. Her tour now includes 30 songs. She was sometimes called Prima Donna in Kazakh media, given her popularity in Kazakhstan for several decades. Roza Rymbayeva became the people's artist at the age of 28. In 2005 Roza Rymbayeva get star on the Star Square in Moscow.

On 2 April 2008, she became a torchbearer of the 2008 Summer Olympics torch relay lap in Almaty.

== Personal awards ==
- 1975 – first prize of the republican contest of initiative
- 1976 – Starred in a movie "First song" (Первая песня), studio "Kazakhtelefilm" (Казахтелефильм)
- 1976 – Prize-winner of the Lenin Komsomol
- 1976–1979 soloist of the ensemble "Gulder" (Гүлдер)
- 1977 – Grand prix of USSR National TV Song Contest "С песней по жизни"
- 1977 – Grand prix of Song Contest "Golden Orpheus", Bulgaria
- 1977 – Special prize in Sopot International Song Festival, Poland
- 1979 – Joined band "Aray" under the management T. Okapov
- 1979 – Honoured as People's Artist of Kazakh SSR
- 1981 – Prize-winner of the Lenin Komsomol
- 1983 – Grand prix of "Gala-83", Cuba
- 1983 – Lead actress in the Soviet-Czechoslovak movie "Good bye, Medeo" (До свидания, Медео)
- 1984 – Graduated from Kazakh institute of theatrics and the arts
- 1986 – Honoured as People's Artist of Kazakh SSR
- 1986 – Grand prix of "The three-kopeck microphone", Turkey
- Since 1995 she has worked as a teacher of the Republican stage-circus college.
- 2000 – Winner of Order of Parasat National award.
- 2000 – "Woman of the year" in nomination for "The Star of the Stage"
- 2005 – Awarded a personal star in Moscow
- 2024 – Honoured as People's Artist of Kyrgyz Republic

== Discography ==
- 1979 – EP "Roza Rymbayeva/Joe Dassin", USSR.
- 1980 – EP "Sings Roza Rymbayeva", USSR.
- 1983 – LP "Výlet do zlaté stepi", Czechoslovakia.
- 1985 – LP "Roza Rymbayeva and Ensemble «Arai", USSR.
- 1987 – LP "Sings Roza Rymbayeva", USSR.
- 2003 – CD "Ademi-au" (Тандаулы андер – Best songs), Kazakhstan.
- 2005 – CD "Roza Rymbayeva" (series "The names of all time"), Russia.
- 2006 – CD "Cенімен біргемін" (Together with you), Kazakhstan.
- 2007 – DVD+CD "30 years on stage" (3 DVD + CD "Ертеніме сенемін" (Believe in Tomorrow), Kazakhstan).
- 2007 – CD "Roza Rymbayeva" (series "Retro Gold Collection"), Russia.
- 2007 – MP3 "Love has come" (series "The names of all time"), Russia.
- 2009 – МР3 "Roza Rymbayeva" (series "Retro Gold Collection"), Russia.
- 2009 – CD "Eternal Spring", Kazakhstan.
- 2010 – CD "Жерiм жанаттым" (Songs of composer Erken Intykbaev), Kazakhstan.
- 2016 – DVD "40 years on stage. Ертеңiме сенемiн", Kazakhstan.
