= Shamshi Kaldayakov =

Kazakhstani composer

Şämşı Qaldaiaqov
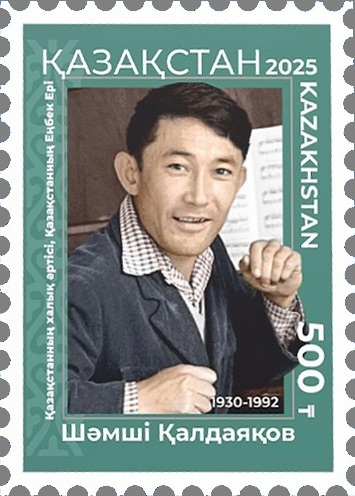
- Kaldayakov on a 2025 stamp of Kazakhstan

Background information
- Born: Jamshid Anapiya uly Donbaev; 15 August 1930; Shauyldyr aul, Otyrar District, Kazakh SSR, USSR
- Died: 29 February 1992 (aged 61) Almaty, Kazakhstan
- Occupations: Composer; Singer

Shamshi Kaldayakov (/ʃæmˈʃiː ˌkældəˈjækɒf/; 15 August 1930 – 29 February 1992) was a Kazakh composer. He was born Şämşı Donbaev (/dɒnˈbaɪɛf/), but ran away from school and changed his name to avoid the police. He started playing music aged 17 and mainly wrote songs in a waltz style, but in 1956, he composed the music to the patriotic song My Kazakhstan. It was adopted in 2006 to be the Kazakhstan national anthem by Kazakh President Nursultan Nazarbayev after a few modifications in the lyrics.
