= Abdilda Tazhibaev =

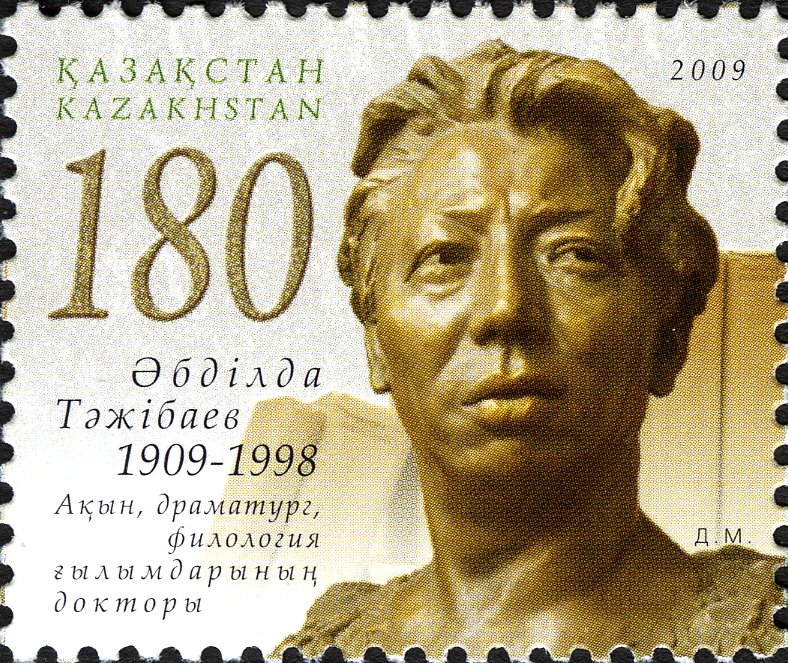

Äbdıldä Täjıbaiūly Täjıbaev (Kazakh: Әбділдә Тәжібайұлы Тәжібаев; 4 February [O.S. 22 January] 1909 – 1991) was a Kazakh writer, screenwriter, and playwright. He was named a People's Writer of the Kazakh SSR in 1985.

Tazhibayev came from a literary family; his mother, Aimankul Tazhibaeva, also wrote in Kazakh. His son, Rustem Tazhibaev, is a film director.
