= Kazakhconcert =

Musical organization in Kazakhstan

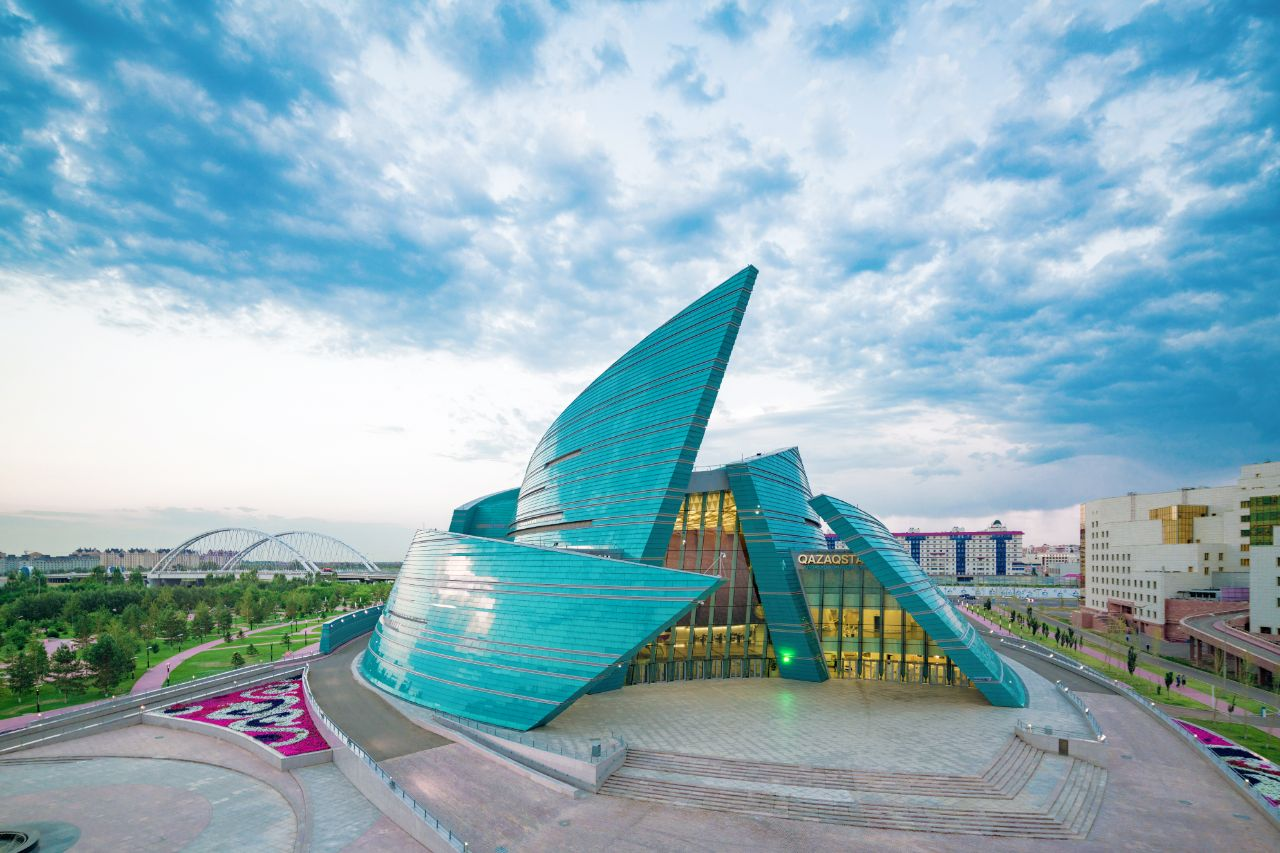
Kazakhconcert building

The State Concert Organization "Kazakhconcert" (Russian: Казахконцерт) of the Ministry of Culture and Sports is the largest musical organization in Kazakhstan. It is held at the Kazakhstan Central Concert Hall which was designed in the mid-2000s by Studio Nicoletti.

== History ==
The concert organization "Kazakhconcert" was created on April, 25th, 1960 by the order № 728 of Ministerial Council of the Kazakh Soviet Socialist Republic. The first steps in the formation of "Kazakhconcert" were associated with the creative activities of outstanding artists whose names figure highly in the history of Kazakh culture. The initial staff of "Kazakhconcert" included the national artists of the Kazakh SSR R.Baglanova, Z.Elebekov, Z.Omarova, Shara Zhienkulova, G.Galieva, R.Esimzhanova, M.Khamzin, Z.Kalambaev; later - S.Tynyshtygulova, A.Yeskaliev, S.Shukirov, G.Talpakova, the vocal and instrumental ensemble "Dos-Mukasan" and other well-known artists.

In the period from the 1960s to the 1980s, concerts were held with the themes of "Kazakhconcert": "Balbyrauyn", "Medeo", "Әsem әnmen tәttі kui", "Kizdar-ai", "Perne", "Rauan", and with performances by the ensembles "Everywhere with a Song", "Youth on the Way", "Aray", "Zhalyn", "Dәuren", the folk instrumental group "Samal" as well as many others.

The concert performance is continued by the following artists: Altynbek Korazbaev, Roza Rymbaeva, Zhenis Seidullauly, Makpal Zhunisova, Aizhan Nurmagambetova, Batyrzhan Smakov, Erlan Ryskali, Dimash Kudaibergen, Medet Chotabaev, Azamat Zheltyrguzov, Moldir Ouelbekova, etc., which enables "Kazakhconcert" to exemplify the best of the country's live music performance.

In 2016, "Kazakhconcert" was granted the status of a state organization of the Ministry of Culture and Sports of the Republic of Kazakhstan.

The main purpose of the "Kazakhconcert" concert organization is to popularize the best samples of musical works, to create highly original, artistic and musical concert programs, to ensure that concert events are generally accessible to all segments of the population and regions of the country, and to contribute to the further development of Kazakh culture.

The best artists and creative teams of the country, which represent all genres of creativity: folklore, classical, pop and musical theater, work in "Kazakhconcert". The creative team includes the Kazakh State Folklore Ensemble "Astana Sazy", Kazakh State Symphony Orchestra, State Trio "Forte Trio", State Musical Theatre "Astana Musical", Folk Art Department "Halyk Kazynasy", VIA "Saz&soul", group "Nazar" and others. Concerts and musicals of the creative teams of "Kazakhconcert" frequently gather a wide audience, and the programs are distinguished by a variety of genres and the high professionalism of the performers.

In February 2018, by order of the Minister of Culture and Sports of the Republic of Kazakhstan, the famous composer, Honored Worker of Kazakhstan Zhenis Seidullauly was appointed as the director of the State Concert Organization "Kazakhconcert". Creative potential and technical capabilities allow "Kazakhconcert" to hold important and large-scale cultural events of the country at a high level. Over the past three years, the concert organization has implemented more than 300 television, international and national projects.

On March 18, 2020 the State Concert Organisation "Kazakhconcert" opened a new Republican Centre for concert and touring activities of state concert organisations.
