= Dina Nurpeisova =

Kazakh composer (1861–1955)

- Born: 1861
- Died: 31 January 1955 (aged 93–94) Almaty
- Occupations: musician, composer
- Instrument: dombyra

Dina Nurpeisova or Nurpeissova (1861 - 31 January 1955) was a composer from the western part of Kazakhstan in the Uralsk area. She was also a noted dombyra player. For her musical accomplishments, she was recognized as the National Artist of Kazakhstan. An orchestra, the Academic Folk Orchestra of Dina Nurpeisova, is named after her, as well as a small village, Dina Nurpeisova. On the 150th anniversary of her birth, in 2011, a postage stamp was issued to commemorate her.

== Biography ==
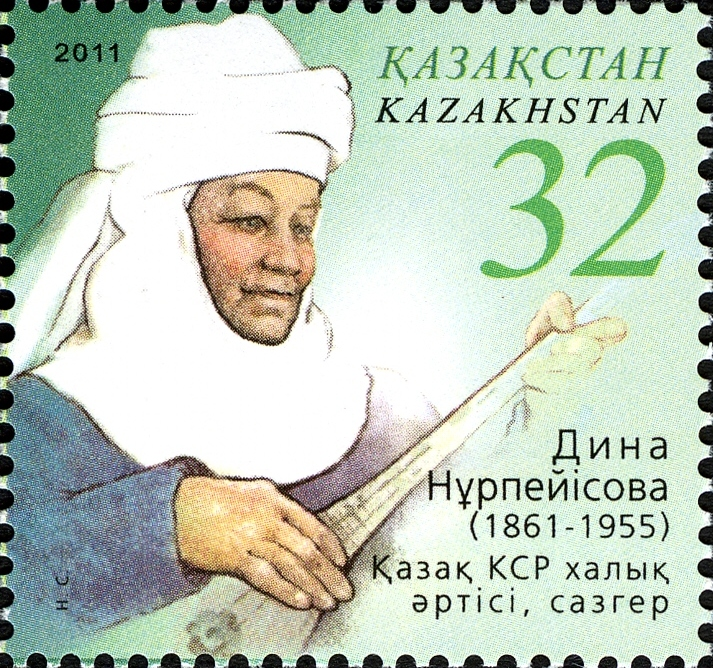
Kazakhstan Postage Stamp

Nurpeisova was born in the village of Beketay-kum, currently in West Kazakhstan Region of Kazakhstan, and her father, a dombyra player, taught her how to play at a young age. As a young girl, she met the composer, Kurmangazy, who became her mentor. He mentored her from 1870 until around 1880, when she married her first husband.

In 1885, her first husband died, and she married his younger brother. In 1922, she was living in the Astrakhan region and in that year her second husband and several of her children died.

In 1937, she met Smagul Koshekbaev, who persuaded Nurpeisova to move to Almaty, where she became nationally recognized as a player and composer. She was hired at the Kazakh Philharmonic that year. She continued to play and compete in various competitions. Her last concert was given in 1952.

Nurpeisova died in Almaty on 31 January 1955.

In April 2021, the country of Kazakhstan celebrated the 160th anniversary of Dina Nurpeisova’s birth.

== Work ==
Nurpeisova's interpretations of traditional music created a link between the past and modern dombyra music. The type of traditional Kazakh folk music she worked with was called kyuy or kyui. V. Belyaev, a Soviet musicologist, wrote that she "raised the value of folk musical instruments."

== Selected compositions ==
- Ana buirigi
- Bulbul
- Bayzhuma
- Enbek ery
- Kogentup
- Nauai
- Sauynshy
