= Abay Opera House =

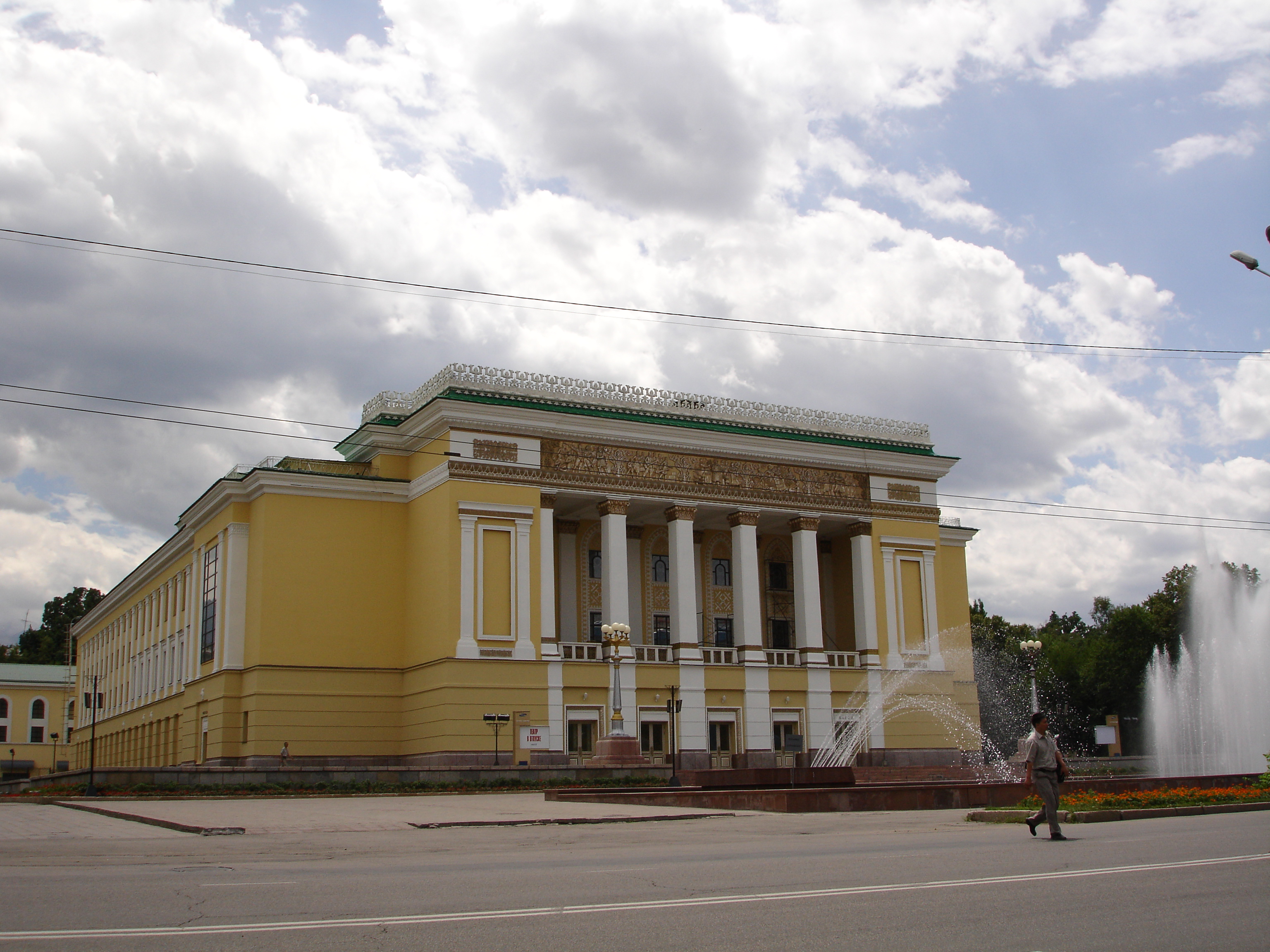

General information
- Type: Theatre
- Location: Almaty, Kazakhstan
- Coordinates: 43°14′56″N 76°56′45″E
- Completed: 1941
- Opening: 1941
- Renovated: 2000
- Owner: municipality of Almaty

Website
- https://www.gatob.kz/

The Abai Kazakh National Opera and Ballet Theatre (Kazakh: Абай атындағы Қазақ ұлттық опера және балет театры, romanized: Abai atyndağy Qazaq ūlttyq opera jäne balet teatry; Russian: Казахский национальный театр оперы и балета имени Абая, romanized: Kazakhskii natsionalʹnyi teatr opery i baleta imeni Abaya) is an opera house located in Almaty, Kazakhstan. Founded as a music studio in 1933, it evolved into a full-fledged theater by 1934.

Since 19 December 2020, the theatre has been designated as national status by President Kassym-Jomart Tokayev.

== History ==
Before becoming a theater, the Abay Opera House began as a music studio in 1933 in Almaty. By 1934, it was established as a theater, and in 1941, the official opening of the new theater building took place. In 1945, it was named after the renowned Kazakh poet, composer, and philosopher Abai Qunanbaiuly.

On 13 January 1934, the first public performance of the musical comedy Aiman Sholpan was staged, with a libretto by Mukhtar Auezov and folk music arranged by Ivan Kotsyk. This event is regarded as the birth of the Kazakh musical theatre. The theater's first composer, Yevgeny Brusilovsky, laid the foundation for Kazakhstan's national opera art, composing operas such as Qyz-Jibek (1934), Jalbyr (1935), and Er Targyn (1936).

In 1935, a Russian opera company was established, leading to the staging of nine productions of Russian and world opera classics by 1937. Notable productions included Carmen, Eugene Onegin, The Queen of Spades, and Aida. That same year, the theater was officially named the Kazakh Opera and Ballet Theater, and a ballet company was formed, performing works such as Coppélia (1937) and Swan Lake (1938). The first Kazakh ballet, Qalqaman and Mamyr, was staged in 1938.

During the 1950s, the theater featured the works of prominent Soviet choreographers like Mikhail Moiseyev and Dauren Abirov, who contributed significantly to the development of ballet at the theater. Productions from this era included The Red Poppy, The Bronze Horseman, and Shurale. Another key figure, Zauyrbek Raibaev, not only performed but also directed several ballets.

In the 1970s, Valery Rutter, an Honored Artist of the Kazakh SSR, staged 15 operas and ballets, with notable productions like Alpamys, Enlik- Kebek, and Spartak. The theater continued to expand its repertoire, staging both Western and Kazakh works, including the opera Abai, with music by Akhmed Zhubanov and Latif Khamidi.

On 19 December 2020, the Abay Opera House was granted a national status by a decree from the President of Kazakhstan.

== Construction ==
The construction of the building began in 1936 and was completed in 1941, designed by architects N.A. Kruglov, N.A. Prostakov, and T.K. Basenov. The structure features a blend of Stalinist architecture, Italian Neoclassical architecture, and national Kazakh elements. The inaugural performance in the new building took place on 7 November 1941.

The first floor, characterized by large, rusticated wall surfaces, serves as a stereobath for the entire building. The second and third floors are accentuated with fine rustication. The portico is supported by powerful pylons that extend into the blank side walls. Bas-relief ornamental frames forming a lancet arch adorn the pylons, featuring quotations on art from the works of Vladimir Lenin.

The main facade is crowned with a high entablature and a lattice ornamental parapet. The frieze is decorated with alternating patterns and multifigure reliefs representing art figures of Kazakhstan. Large ornamental cartouches are positioned at the level of the frieze on the pylons.

The side facades are defined by staggered pilasters and large rectangular windows, enhanced by patterns within broad platbands of rectangular doorways, ogival windows, and shallow niches containing texts. The second-floor loggia railings, frieze panels, architrave and cornice bands, as well as the capitals and bases of pilasters and columns, contribute to the intricate design.

The configuration, size, and height of the ornamental elements vary depending on their placement within the overall composition. The last renovation of the building was completed in 2000, preserving its original architectural style.

== Management ==
Before the collapse of the Soviet government, the theatre was managed by the Ministry of Culture of the Kazakh SSR. After that it management passed to the reformed Ministry of Culture of the Republic of Kazakhstan. Nowadays it is managed by the Ministry of Culture and Sports of the Republic of Kazakhstan.

== The stars of the opera company ==
- Qurmanbek Jandarbekov (1933–1944)
- Küläş Baiseitova (1933–1957)
- Garifulla Qurmangaliev (1934–1966)
- Jamal Omarova (1934–1937)
- Rishat Abdullin (1939–1985)
- Baigali Dosymjanov (1941–1964)
- Shabal Beisekova (1941–1966)
- Qauken Kenjetaev (1946–1966)
- Roza Baglanova (1947–1949)
- Ermek Serkebaev (1947–2006)
- Roza Janova (1953–1977)
- Bibigul Tölegenova (1954–1956), (1971–1982)
- Alibek Dnişev (1978–1997)
- Nurjamal Ösenbaeva (1984–1997)
- Maira Muhamed-qyzy (1996–2002)

== The stars of the ballet company ==
- Shara Zhienkulova (1934–1940)
- Aleksandr Seleznyov (1937–1945)
- Inessa Manskaya (1945–1965)
- Bolat Aiuhanov (1957–1959)
- Lyudmila Rudakova (1965–1980)
- Ramazan Bapov (1966–1988)
- Rauşan Baiseitova (1966–1986)
- Larisa Sycheva (1974–1978)
- Maira Kadyrova (1976–1997)
- Gulzhan Tütkibaeva (1982–2002)
- Säule Rahmedova (1987–1989, 2009–2019)
- Quralai Sarqytbaeva (1993–2006)
- Leila Älpieva (1995–1996) and (2000–2009)
- Serjan Qaukov (1998–1999)
- Dosjan Tabyldy (2003–2005)
- Farhad Buriev (2005–2017)
- Gülvira Qurbanova (2004–present)

== Theater repertoire ==
=== Opera ===
- Abai
- Aida
- Abylai Khan
- Aisulu
- Masquerade ball
- Birjan and Sara
- La bohème
- The Merry Widow
- Anne Frank's diary
- Don Pasquale
- Eugene Onegin
- Enlik-Kebek
- La Cenerentola
- Iolanta
- Les pêcheurs de perles

=== Ballet ===
- Anna Karenina
- Bakhchisarai fountain
- La Bayadère
- Boléro
- Don Quixote
- Giselle
- Carmen Suite
- Carmina Burana
- Coppélia
- Le Corsaire
- Swan Lake
- Legend of Love
- Pavana Mavra
- Pulcinella
- Romeo and Juliet

== See also ==
- Panfilov Street Promenade
