= Yevgeny Brusilovsky =

Russian composer

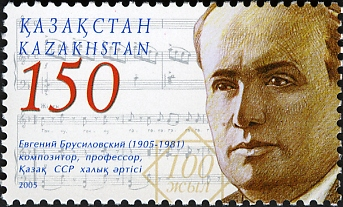
Yevgeny Brusilovsky on a Kazakhstan stamp

Yevgeny Grigoryevich Brusilovsky (Russian: Евгений Григорьевич Брусиловский; 12 November [O.S. 30 October] 1905 – 9 May 1981) was a Soviet and Russian composer who settled in Kazakhstan. He wrote the first Kazakh opera, co-wrote the music for the anthem of the Kazakh Soviet Socialist Republic, and was a People's Artist of the Kazakh SSR.

== Early life and education ==
Brusilovsky was born in Rostov-on-Don in 1905. He studied at the Moscow Conservatory and later at the Leningrad Conservatory, under Maximilian Steinberg.

== Career ==
In 1933, he was sent to Alma-Ata, Kazakhstan (then the Kazakh Soviet Socialist Republic) to study the folk music of the region, and stayed there for the rest of his life. From 1934 to 1936 he was the music director of the Kazakh National Theatre, and from 1949 to 1951 the artistic director of the Philharmonic. He founded the Abay Opera House in 1934.

Brusilovsky taught at the Alma-Ata Conservatory (now the Kurmangazy Kazakh National Conservatory) from 1944, becoming Professor of Composition in 1955. His students included A. Zatsepin, B. Baikadamov, M. Tulebaev, B. Yerzakovich, K. Kuzhamyarov, E. Rakhmadiyev and S. Mukhamedzhanov.

== Death ==
He died in Moscow in 1981, aged 75. He was buried at the Kuntsevo Cemetery.

== Works ==
Yevgeny Brusilovsky frequently used the music and legends of Kazakhstan in his compositions. They include:

- 9 operas
  - Kyz Zhibek (1934)
  - Zhalbyr (1935)
  - Er Torgyn (Er-Targhin) (1936)
  - Aiman-Sholpan (1938)
  - Golden Grain (1940)
  - The Guard, forward! (1942)
  - Amangeldy (1945, co-author M. Tulebayev)
  - Dudarai (1953)
  - Heirs (1962)
- 4 ballets
  - Gulyandom (1940; the first Uzbek national ballet)
  - Kozy Korpesh and Bojan Sulu (1967)
- 8 symphonies
  - Symphony No. 1 (1931)
  - Symphony No. 2 (1932)
  - Symphony No. 3 "The Golden Steppe" (1944)
  - Symphony No. 4 in C minor (1957)
  - Symphony No. 5 in D minor (1961)
  - Symphony No. 6 in G "On a Theme of Kurmangazy" (1965; State Prize of Kazakhstan, 1967)
  - Symphony No. 7 (1969)
  - Symphony No. 8 (1972)
- Lyric Poem "Lonely Birch" for orchestra (1942)
- Anthem of the Kazakh Soviet Socialist Republic (1945, with M. Tulebaev and L. Hamidi)
- Piano Concerto in D minor (1947)
- Trumpet Concerto (1967)
- Cello or Viola Concerto (1969)
- Zheldrme pamyati Baizkova for folk orchestra
- 2 string quartets (1944, 1951)
- Violin Sonata
- Boz Aygir (The Wild Horse; violin and piano)
- Scherzo, violin and piano
- a large number of choral and vocal works
  - Dzhambul, Cycle for tenor and orchestra
  - Soviet Kazakhstan Cantata, narrator, soloists, chorus and orchestra
  - Songs of Life for voice and piano
- 500 songs and ballads
