= List of years in Kazakhstan =

This is a list of years in Kazakhstan.

== 20th century ==
1990s
1990
1991
1992
1993
1994
1995
1996
1997
1998
1999

== 21st century ==
2000s
2000
2001
2002
2003
2004
2005
2006
2007
2008
2009

2010s
2010
2011
2012
2013
2014
2015
2016
2017
2018
2019

2020s
2020
2021
2022
2023
2024
2025
2026

== See also ==
- Outline of Kazakhstan
- List of Kazakhstan-related topics
