= 2020 in Kazakhstan =

- Decades: 2000s; 2010s; 2020s
- See also: Other events of 2020; Timeline of Kazakhstani history

Events of 2020 in Kazakhstan.

== Incumbents ==
- President: Kassym-Jomart Tokayev
- Prime Minister: Askar Mamin

== Events ==
=== January ===
3 January – Funeral of Serikbolsyn Abdildin, former chairman of the Supreme Council.

=== February ===
- 5 to 8 February – Ethnic clashes involving Dungans and Kazakhs killed 10 people, causing many families to flee to neighboring Kyrgyzstan. About 30 houses and 15 commercial properties were destroyed during the clash.

=== March ===
- 3 March – A court orders the early release of Mukhtar Dzhakishev, the former CEO of state nuclear firm Kazatomprom, who had been sentenced to 14 years in prison for corruption in 2010. Upon his release he will have served more than 11 years in prison.
- 13 March – The country reports its first two confirmed cases of COVID-19; both are Kazakh nationals who recently returned from Germany.
- 15 March – A state of emergency is declared in the country over the coronavirus pandemic. The presidential decree from President Kassym-Jomart Tokayev imposes a national quarantine and restricts both entry and departures from the country to all except diplomats and individuals invited by the government.

=== April ===
- 14 April – The Ministry of Foreign Affairs summoned the Chinese ambassador after an article claiming that Kazakhs are "eager to return to China" and "do not have too many complaints" about China's historical invasions of the country was published on the private Chinese website Sohu.

=== June ===
- 17 June – The country's sovereign wealth fund Samruk-Kazyna announces that plans to sell shares in the state-run oil and gas company KazMunayGaz abroad will be delayed from this year to 2022 due to the COVID-19 pandemic.

=== July ===
- 10 July – Authorities in the country deny a report published by Chinese officials alleging that the country is experiencing an outbreak of "unknown pneumonia" potentially deadlier than COVID-19.
- 17 July – The country announces that it will start adding thousands of cases and hundreds of deaths to its COVID-19 tallies starting next month, describing the corresponding pneumonia-related cases, which had not been confirmed by tests, as most likely linked to the SARS-CoV-2 novel coronavirus.

=== October ===
- 1 October – Former President Nursultan Nazarbayev expresses concern over the escalation of the Nagorno-Karabakh conflict and calls for Baku and Yerevan to launch negotiations.

=== December ===
- 19 December - the President signed Law No. 365-VI ZRK1 and Law No. 384-VI ZRK2 (“Amendments“), respectively, which introduced certain changes to the country’s anti-corruption legislation, including the Anti-Corruption Law, Criminal Code and Civil Code which took effect by December 31.

== Deaths ==
=== February ===
- 3 February – Vilen Prokofyev, ice hockey player (b. 2001).

=== July ===
- 8 July – Lyudmila Stanukinas, documentary filmmaker (b. 1930).
- 18 July – Myrzageldy Kemel, academic and politician, former Deputy (b. 1949).

=== August ===
- 2 August – Zhaksylyk Ushkempirov, wrestler (b. 1951).
- 16 August – Aisultan Nazarbayev, footballer and sporting executive (b. 1990).

=== September ===
- 6 September – Sergey Belyayev, sport shooter, Olympic silver medallist (b. 1960).

=== November ===
- 10 November – Nagima Aitkhozhina, biologist (b. 1946).

== See also ==
- List of years in Kazakhstan
- 2020 in Kazakhstan
- 2020 in Kazakhstani sport
