= 2016 in Kazakhstan =

- Decades: 1990s; 2000s; 2010s; 2020s
- See also: Other events of 2016; Timeline of Kazakhstani history

Events from the year 2016 in Kazakhstan.

== Incumbents ==
- President: Nursultan Nazarbayev
- Prime minister: Karim Massimov (until 8 September) Bakhytzhan Sagintayev (from 9 September)

== Events ==
=== March ===
- 20 March – Legislative elections were held in the country in accordance with the date set by president Nursultan Nazarbayev. Nur Otan won the election with over 82% of the vote.

=== June ===
- 5 – 10 June – A series of shootings on civilian and military targets occurred in Aktobe, Kazakhstan, resulting in 7 deaths and 37 others injured. Eighteen attackers were killed and nine were arrested.

=== July ===
- 18 July – Ruslan Kulikbayev, a 26-year-old Salafi jihadist and ex-convict, shot and killed 10 people, including 8 police officers and 2 civilians, at a police station in Almaty, Kazakhstan before being apprehended in a chase and shootout with law enforcement.

=== August ===
- 5 – 21 August – Kazakhstan competed at the 2016 Summer Olympics with 104 competitors in 17 sports. The country won a total of 18 Olympic medals (3 gold, 5 silver, 10 bronze), its most successful outcome in Summer Olympic history.

=== September ===
- 9 September – Bakhytzhan Sagintayev took the office of prime minister.

== Deaths ==
- 10 September – Pyotr Devyatkin, ice hockey player (b. 1977).
