= 2022 in Kazakhstan =

- Decades: 2000s; 2010s; 2020s
- See also: Other events of 2022; Timeline of Kazakhstani history

Events of 2022 in Kazakhstan.

== Incumbents ==
Photo	Post	Name
	Chairman of the Security Council of Kazakhstan (Until 5 January)	Nursultan Nazarbayev
	Chairman of the Security Council of Kazakhstan (from 5 January)	Kassym-Jomart Tokayev
	President of Kazakhstan	Kassym-Jomart Tokayev
	Prime Minister of Kazakhstan (until 5 January)	Askar Mamin
	Prime Minister of Kazakhstan (from 5 January)	Älihan Smaiylov (acting) 5–11 January

== Events ==
=== Ongoing ===
- COVID-19 pandemic in Kazakhstan

=== January ===
- 2 January – The 2022 Kazakh protests started following a hike in fuel prices.
- 5 January – With the protests widening and encompassing variety of causes, a state of emergency is declared and the government resigns. Älihan Smaiylov appointed acting prime minister.
- 6 January – Russian troops were brought in to suppress the unrest. President Tokayev announced the restoration of vehicle fuel price caps for six months.
- 11 January – The 2022 Kazakh protests ended; the protests lasted 9 days.
- 25 February – Kazakhstan announced it will deny Russia’s request for troops to join the war. It will also not join Putin’s recognition of Donetsk People's Republic or Luhansk People's Republic.
- 3 March – Kazakhstan begins its production of the Sputnik Light COVID-19 vaccine.
- 4 March – Arianespace and OneWeb suspend all future rocket launches from Baikonur Cosmodrome in Kazakhstan, and the use of Russian Soyuz rockets for their spacecraft.
- 5 March – Kyrgyzstan Foreign Minister Ruslan Kazakbayev expresses his support for any efforts to mediate a ceasefire between Russia and Ukraine.
- 6 March – Kazakhstan will allow anti-war protests in the country amidst fears that the country could be sanctioned. Protesters gather in Almaty to protest Russia’s invasion of Ukraine.
- 11 March – Air Astana suspends all flights to and from Russia, citing the "withdrawal of insurance coverage for commercial flights".
- 16 March – President of Kazakhstan Kassym-Jomart Tokayev proposes a series of reforms to the national parliament, including re-establishing the Constitutional Court, reducing the membership requirement for establishing political parties from 20,000 to 5,000, reducing the number of parliament deputies appointed by the president, and restoring three regions that were merged during the 1990s. He says that the purpose of these reforms is to move the current political system from "superpresidential" rule to a presidential republic with a strong parliament.
- 28 March – Kazakhstan says that it does not want to be behind a "new iron curtain", and that international companies boycotting Russia are welcome to "move production to Kazakhstan".
- 7 April – Kazakhstan lifts their COVID-19 travel restrictions at the country's borders with Kyrgyzstan, Russia and Uzbekistan.
- 14 April – Kazakhstan announced it would introduce quotas for wheat and flour exports. Russia will maintain its export ban on wheat, rye, barley and maize until 30 June in order to stabilise its domestic market.
- 5 June – 2022 Kazakh constitutional referendum: Kazakhs go to the polls to vote on 56 amendments to the constitution and President Kassym-Jomart Tokayev's "Second Republic" proposals, among them the reduction of presidential powers, reform of the Parliament, the curbing of former President Nursultan Nazarbayev's powers, and the creation of three new regions.
- 8 June – As a result of the 2022 Kazakh constitutional referendum, three new regions are established: Abai Region, Jetisu Region, Ulytau Region.
- 11 July – A Russian court lifts the suspension for the CPC pipeline and instead fines its operators 200,000 rubles ($3,300) for oil spills. The oil pipeline, one of the world's largest, is the route for nearly all of Kazakhstan's oil exports, which represents about 1% of global oil supply.
- 1 August – A post made by the VK social media account of Dmitry Medvedev, the incumbent Deputy Chairman of the Security Council of Russia and former President of Russia, refers to Georgia and Kazakhstan as "artificial" creations and advocates the return of the two countries to Russian sovereignty. The post is quickly taken down and attributed to hackers.
- 13 September – Kazakh President Kassym-Jomart Tokayev agrees to change the name of Kazakhstan's capital from "Nur-Sultan" back to "Astana". He had previously changed the capital's name in 2019 to honor his predecessor Nursultan Nazarbayev.
- 26 September – Kazakhstan says that it will not recognize the results of the ongoing annexation referendums in Russian-occupied Ukraine.
- 27 September – 2022 Russian mobilization:
  - Kazakhstan says that around 98,000 Russian civilians have entered the country by land and air since Russian president Vladimir Putin ordered a military mobilization.
- 3 November – Five people are killed and four others are injured in a methane explosion at a coal mine in Karaganda.
- 20 November – 2022 Kazakh presidential election:
  - Kazakhs vote to elect their president in a snap election.
  - President Kassym-Jomart Tokayev is re-elected to a seven-year term.

== Deaths ==
=== February ===
- Abdizhamil Karimuly Nurpeisov — kazakh writer, author. Dead in 5 February 2022.

== See also ==
- Outline of Kazakhstan
- List of Kazakhstan-related topics
- History of Kazakhstan
- List of Kazakhs
- List of Kazakh khans
