= 2011 in Kazakhstan =

- Decades: 1990s; 2000s; 2010s; 2020s
- See also: Other events of 2011; Timeline of Kazakhstani history

The following lists events that happened during 2011 in Kazakhstan.

== Incumbents ==
- President: Nursultan Nazarbayev
- Prime Minister: Karim Massimov

== Events ==
=== February ===
- February 2 – The parliament approved a bill giving the president the power to declare a snap presidential election.
- February 4 – President Nursultan Nazarbayev calls an early election for April 3, rejecting a plan for a referendum intended to allow him to rule for another decade.

=== April ===
- April 3 – A presidential election takes place in the country, with incumbent president Nursultan Nazarbayev winning 95% of the vote.
- April 8 – Nursultan Nazarbayev is sworn in as President of Kazakhstan for another five-year term, in a vote criticized as flawed.

=== December ===
- December 16 - The Zhanaozen massacre took place in Kazakhstan's western Mangystau Region.
