= 2013 in Kazakhstan =

- Decades: 1990s; 2000s; 2010s; 2020s
- See also: Other events of 2013; Timeline of Kazakhstani history

Events in the year 2013 in Kazakhstan.

== Incumbents ==
- President: Nursultan Nazarbayev
- Prime Minister: Serik Akhmetov

== Events ==
=== January ===
- January 29 – SCAT Airlines Flight 760, a scheduled flight from Kokshetau to Almaty, crashed in the village of Kyzyltu, killing all 21 people on board.

=== May ===
- May 7 – The first military parade in honour of Defender of the Fatherland Day was held at the Otar Military Base.

=== August ===
- August 10 – 17 – Kazakhstan competed at the 2013 World Championships in Athletics in Moscow, Russia. A team of 17 athletes represented the country in the event.

=== September ===
- September 2 – The Third Parliament Session was opened.
- September 5 – The country took part in the G20 Summit in Saint Petersburg for the first time.

=== December ===
- December 1 – A new building of the Nazarbayev Center was opened.

== Deaths ==
- November 16 – Ermek Serkebayev, People's Artist of the USSR (1959).
- December 27 – Roza Zhamanova, People's Artist of the USSR (1959).
