= 2019 in Kazakhstan =

- Decades: 1990s; 2000s; 2010s; 2020s
- See also: Other events of 2019; Timeline of Kazakhstani history

Events of 2019 in Kazakhstan.

== Incumbents ==
- President: Nursultan Nazarbayev (until March)
  Kassym-Jomart Tokayev (since June)
- Prime Minister: Bakhytzhan Sagintayev (until February)
  Askar Mamin (since February)

== Events ==
=== February ===
- February 21 – President Nazarbayev fires the government and appoints Askar Mamin as the new prime minister.

=== March ===
- March 19
- March 20 – Nazarbayev resigns after 30 years in power.
  - Kassym-Jomart Tokayev is sworn into office at a ceremony in the Parliament of Kazakhstan attended by outgoing President Nazarbayev.
  - The Parliament of Kazakhstan approves the renaming of the capital city from Astana to Nursultan.
- March 24 – Kazakhstan loses 0–4 to Russia in a match of UEFA Euro 2020 qualifying Group I at Astana Arena.

=== June ===
- June 9 – Early presidential elections were held in the country with seven registered candidates, including incumbent president Kassym-Jomart Tokayev. Tokayev was subsequently re-elected with 71% of the vote.

=== December ===
- December 27 – At least 12 died and at least 60 injured in a plane crash near Almaty Airport.

== Deaths ==
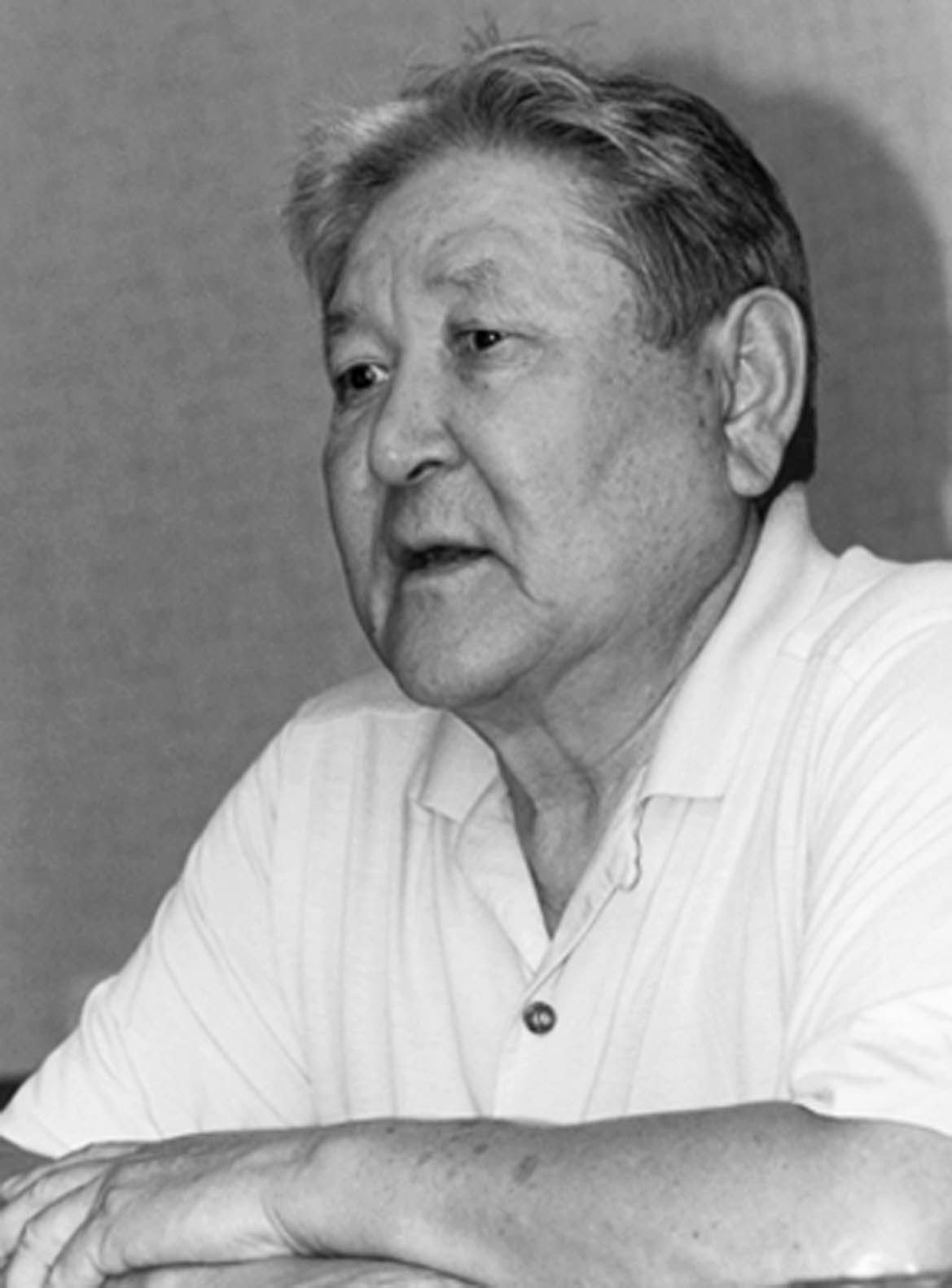
Serikbolsyn Abdildin

=== December ===
- 31 December – Serikbolsyn Abdildin, economist and politician (b. 1937).
