= 2017 in Kazakhstan =

- Decades: 1990s; 2000s; 2010s; 2020s
- See also: Other events of 2017; Timeline of Kazakhstani history

Events from the year 2017 in Kazakhstan.

== Incumbents ==
- President: Nursultan Nazarbayev
- Prime Minister: Bakhytjan Sagintayev

== Events ==
=== June ===
- June 10 – Expo 2017 Astana begins.

=== September ===
- September 10 – Expo 2017 Astana ends.
