= 2015 in Kazakhstan =

- Decades: 1990s; 2000s; 2010s; 2020s
- See also: Other events of 2015; Timeline of Kazakhstani history

Events in the year 2015 in Kazakhstan.

== Incumbents ==
- President: Nursultan Nazarbayev
- Prime Minister: Karim Massimov

== Events ==
=== January ===
- January 1 – The Eurasian Economic Union came into effect, creating a political and economic union between the country and Russia, Belarus, and Armenia.

== Deaths ==
- January 5 – Vadim Glovatsky, Kazakhstani Olympic ice hockey player (1998), (Metallurg Magnitogorsk).
- December 21 – Andrei Troschinsky, Kazakhstani ice hockey player, Asian champion (1999) .
