= 2005 in Kazakhstan =

- Decades: 1990s; 2000s; 2010s; 2020s
- See also: Other events of 2005; Timeline of Kazakhstani history

The following lists events that happened during 2005 in the Republic of Kazakhstan.

== Incumbents ==
- President: Nursultan Nazarbayev
- Prime Minister: Daniyal Akhmetov

== Events ==
=== November ===
- November 9 – Venus Express lifts off from the Baikonur Cosmodrome.
- November 11 – oppositionist Zamanbek Nurkadilov is found dead in his apartment in Almaty.

=== December ===
- December 4 – Exit polls indicated that incumbent leader Nursultan Nazarbayev won the presidential election by a landslide.
