= 1992 in Kazakhstan =

- Decades: 1990s; 2000s; 2010s
- See also: Other events of 1992; Timeline of Kazakhstani history

== Incumbents ==
- President: Nursultan Nazarbayev

== Events ==
- 30 January – Kazakhstan is admitted to the Conference on Security and Co-operation in Europe.
- 2 March – Kazakhstan becomes a member of the United Nations.
- 8 August – The first edition of the Kazakhstan Cup concludes when Kairat defeats Fosfor at the final.
