= 2014 in Kazakhstan =

- Decades: 1990s; 2000s; 2010s; 2020s
- See also: Other events of 2014; Timeline of Kazakhstani history

The following lists events that happened during 2014 in Kazakhstan.

== Incumbents ==
- President: Nursultan Nazarbayev
- Prime Minister: Serik Akhmetov (until 2 April) Karim Massimov (from 2 April)

== Events ==
=== April ===
- April 16 – A Soyuz-U rocket carrying a new Egyptian communication satellite, EgyptSat-2, was launched from the Baikonur Cosmodrome.

=== May ===
- May 29 – President Nursultan Nazarbayev and the heads of Russia and Belarus sign a treaty forming the Eurasian Economic Union.

=== December ===
- December 22 – Kazakhstan renews its military cooperation with Ukraine, to which it promises vital supplies of coal, following a visit to Kyiv by President Nursultan Nazarbayev.
