= 2018 in Kazakhstan =

- Decades: 1990s; 2000s; 2010s; 2020s
- See also: Other events of 2018; Timeline of Kazakhstani history

Events in the year 2018 in Kazakhstan.

== Incumbents ==
- President: Nursultan Nazarbayev
- Prime Minister: Bakhytzhan Sagintayev

== Events ==
=== January ===
- 18 January – A bus fire on the Samara–Shymkent road kills 52 passengers, with five people escaping.

=== February ===
- 9 – 25 February – Kazakhstan participated in the 2018 Winter Olympics in PyeongChang, South Korea, with 46 competitors in 9 sports.

=== March ===
- 9 – 18 March – Kazakhstan participated in the 2018 Winter Paralympics in PyeongChang, South Korea.
- 15 March – A summit of Central Asian leaders takes place in Astana.

=== October ===
- 11 October – The flight of the Soyuz MS-10 rocket from Baikonur Cosmodrome to the International Space Station is aborted during launch following the failure of the booster rocket. The two-man crew lands safely near Jezkazgan.

== Deaths ==
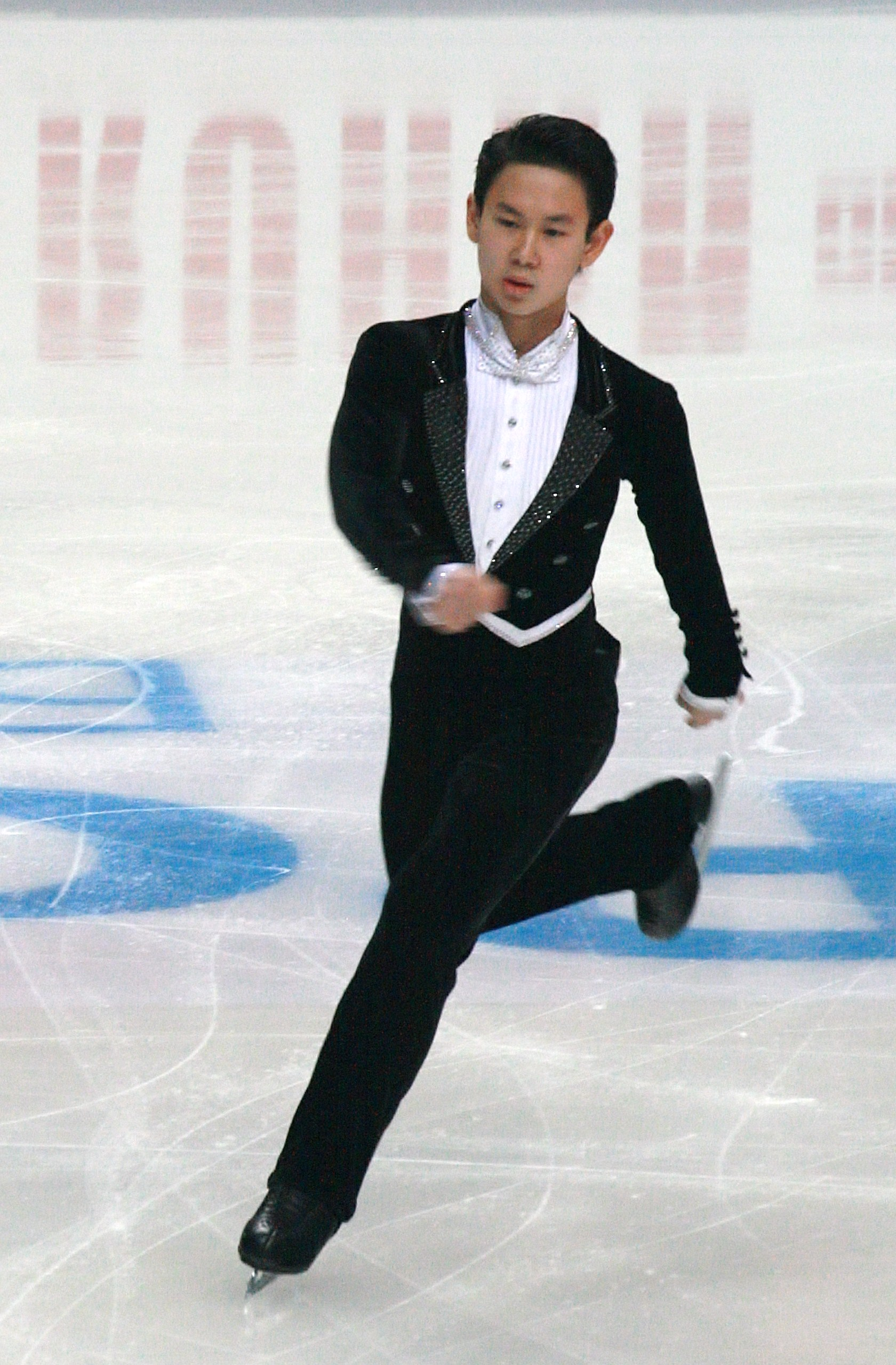
Denis Ten

- 17 February – Rakhymshan Otarbayev, writer and playwright (b. 1956).
- 19 July – Denis Ten, figure skater, Olympic bronze medalist (b. 1993).
