= 2012 in Kazakhstan =

- Decades: 1990s; 2000s; 2010s; 2020s
- See also: Other events of 2012; Timeline of Kazakhstani history

The following lists events that happened during 2012 in Kazakhstan.

== Incumbents ==
- President: Nursultan Nazarbayev
- Prime Minister: Karim Massimov (until 24 September) Serik Akhmetov (from 24 September)

== Events ==
=== April ===
- April 23 - Kazakhstan issues an official ‘thank you’ to Sacha Baron Cohen for his comedy character Borat Sagdiyev despite an initial ban.

=== July ===
- July 17 – The Syrian consulate in Almaty suffered serious damage following an alleged arson attack.

=== December ===
- December 25 – An Antonov An-72-100 plane crashed near Shymkent, killing all 27 people on board.
