= 2021 in Kazakhstan =

- Decades: 2000s; 2010s; 2020s
- See also: Other events of 2021; Timeline of Kazakhstani history

== Incumbents ==
Photo	Post	Name
	Chairman of the Security Council of Kazakhstan	Nursultan Nazarbayev
	President of Kazakhstan	Kassym-Jomart Tokayev
	Prime Minister of Kazakhstan	Askar Mamin

== Events ==
=== Ongoing ===
- COVID-19 pandemic in Kazakhstan

=== January ===
- 1 January - the chairmanship of the Eurasian Economic Union passes from Belarus to Kazakhstan.
- 2 January - Death Penalty officially abolished after nearly a two decade recession.
- 10 January - Kazakh legislative election
- 15 January - Askar Mamin is reappointed as Prime Minister of Kazakhstan by President Kassym-Jomart Tokayev. Nurlan Nigmatulin is also reelected as the Chair of the Mazhilis.

=== February ===
- 10 February – Small protest against prosecution on Uyghurs in Mainland China which resulted to crackdown.
- 25 February – Murat Nurtileu is named as the new Deputy Head of Presidential Administration.
- 28 February – At least a dozen are arrested by the police demanding the release of all political prisoners who have been arrested and detained during the unrest in the legislative elections.

=== March ===
- 8 March – First Women's March held in Almaty.

=== April ===
- 17 April – Three crewmen from the International Space Station griping their spacejet of Soyuz MS-17 land on Kazakh Soil.

=== May ===
- The session of the Supreme Eurasian Economic Council takes place.
- President Tokayev signs into law a bill that bans selling and leasing agricultural land to foreigners.

=== December ===
- 27 November to 5 December — Kazakhstan will host the 2021 MMA World Championships and U20 Youth MMA World Championships in Nur-Sultan.

== Deaths ==
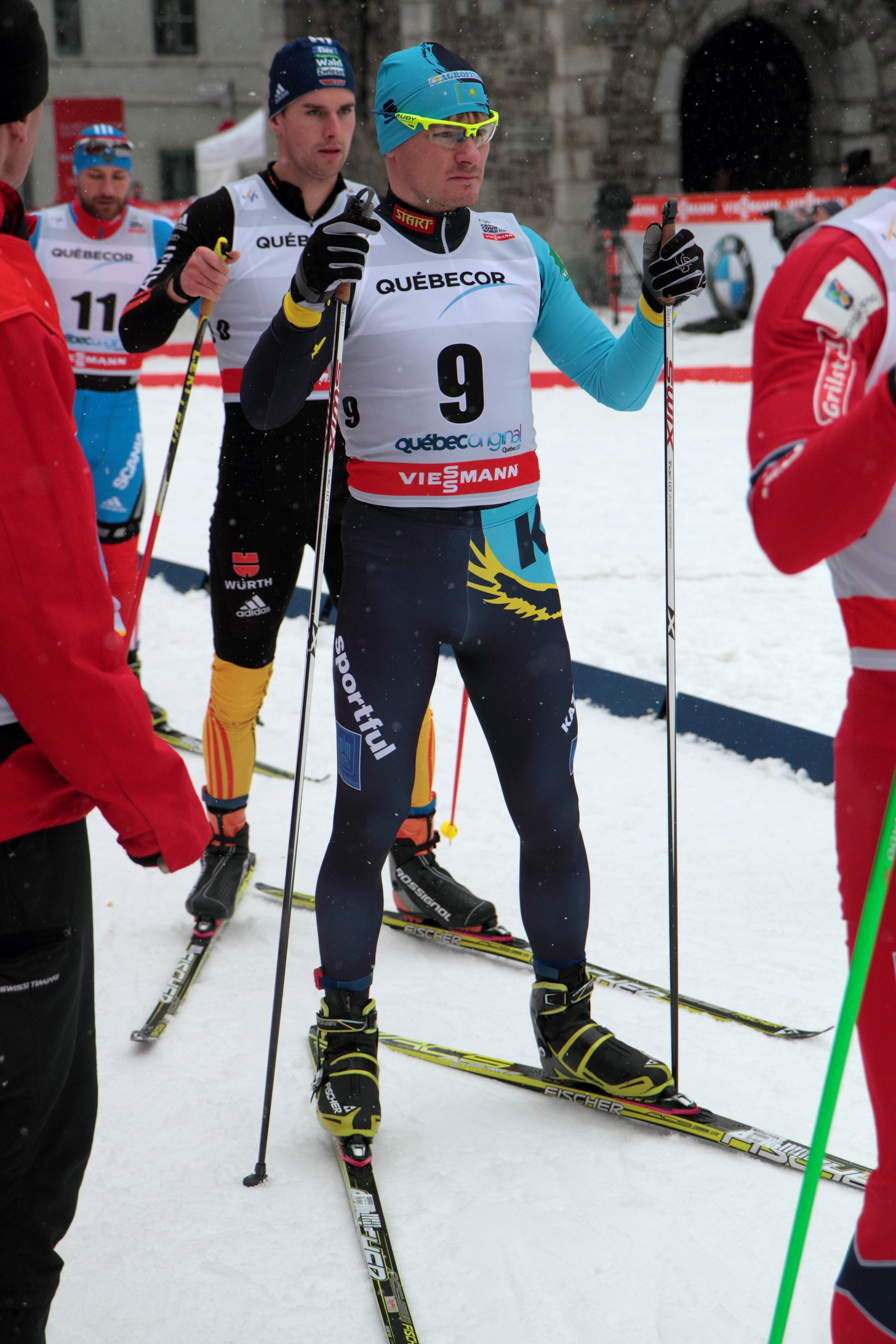
Nikolay Chebotko

- 24 January - Nikolay Chebotko, Kazakh Olympic cross country skier (2002, 2006, 2010, 2014), traffic collision. (b. 1982)
- 3 February – Alizhan Ibragimov, businessman and billionaire (b.1954)
- 9 February – Klavdiya Pishchulina, scientist. (b. 1934)
- 16 April – Yessengaly Raushanov (b. 1957), poet

== See also ==
- Outline of Kazakhstan
- List of Kazakhstan-related topics
- History of Kazakhstan
- List of Kazakhs
- List of Kazakh khans
