= History of Kazakhstan =

Kazakhstan, the largest country fully within the Eurasian Steppe, has been a historical crossroads and home to numerous different peoples, states and empires throughout history. Throughout history, peoples on the territory of modern Kazakhstan used to have a nomadic lifestyle, which developed and influenced Kazakh culture.

Human habitation of the territory of present-day Kazakhstan dates back to the Paleolithic, with Neanderthals and later modern humans inhabiting the region. The Neolithic period saw the development of agriculture, animal husbandry, and the Botai culture, associated with early horse domestication. From the first millennium BC, the region was inhabited by nomadic peoples including the Saka, who spoke Iranian languages.

In the 13th century, the region became part of the Mongol Empire and subsequently the Golden Horde. The Kazakhs emerged from the Turkic and Mongol peoples of the Jochid Ulus, and in the 15th century Zhanibek Khan and Kerey Khan established the Kazakh Khanate. By the 16th century, the Kazakh Khanate had become a major nomadic power in the steppe and the last major Chinggisid state in the region.

During the 18th and 19th centuries, the Kazakh Khanate fragmented into the three zhuzes and gradually came under Russian control. The khanate institution was formally abolished in 1822, and the final major attempt to restore Kazakh independence, led by Kenesary Qasymov, ended with his death in 1847. Following the Russian Revolution, the Alash Orda government sought Kazakh autonomy, but Kazakhstan was incorporated into the Soviet Union. Soviet collectivization caused a catastrophic famine in the early 1930s, resulting in the deaths of large numbers of Kazakhs and the flight of many others abroad. Kazakhstan became a Soviet republic in 1936 and declared independence on 16 December 1991 following the dissolution of the Soviet Union.

== Prehistory ==
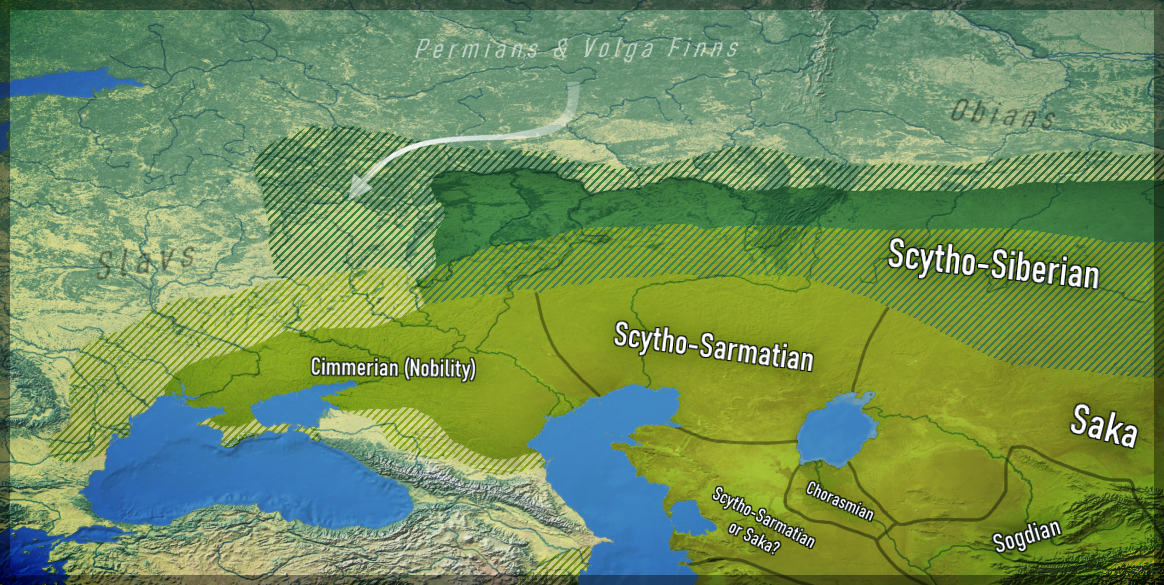
Central Asia during the Iron Age, including modern Kazakhstan

Humans have inhabited Kazakhstan since the Lower Paleolithic, generally pursuing the nomadic pastoralism for which the region's climate and terrain are suitable. Prehistoric Bronze Age cultures that extended into the region include the Srubna, the Afanasevo and the Andronovo. Between 500 BC and 500 AD Kazakhstan was home to the Saka and the Huns, early nomadic warrior cultures.

According to the Journal of Archaeological Science, in July 2020 scientists from South Ural State University studied two Late Bronze Age horses with the aid of radiocarbon dating from Kurgan 5 of the Novoilinovsky 2 cemetery in the Lisakovsk city in the Kostanay region. Researcher Igor Chechushkov indicated that the Andronovites were riding horses several centuries earlier than many researchers had previously assumed. Among the horses investigated, the stallion was nearly 20 years old and the mare was 18 years old. According to scientists, animals were buried with the person they accompanied throughout their lives, and they were used not only for food but also for harnessing vehicles and riding.

== Turkic people migrated into Kazakhstan ==
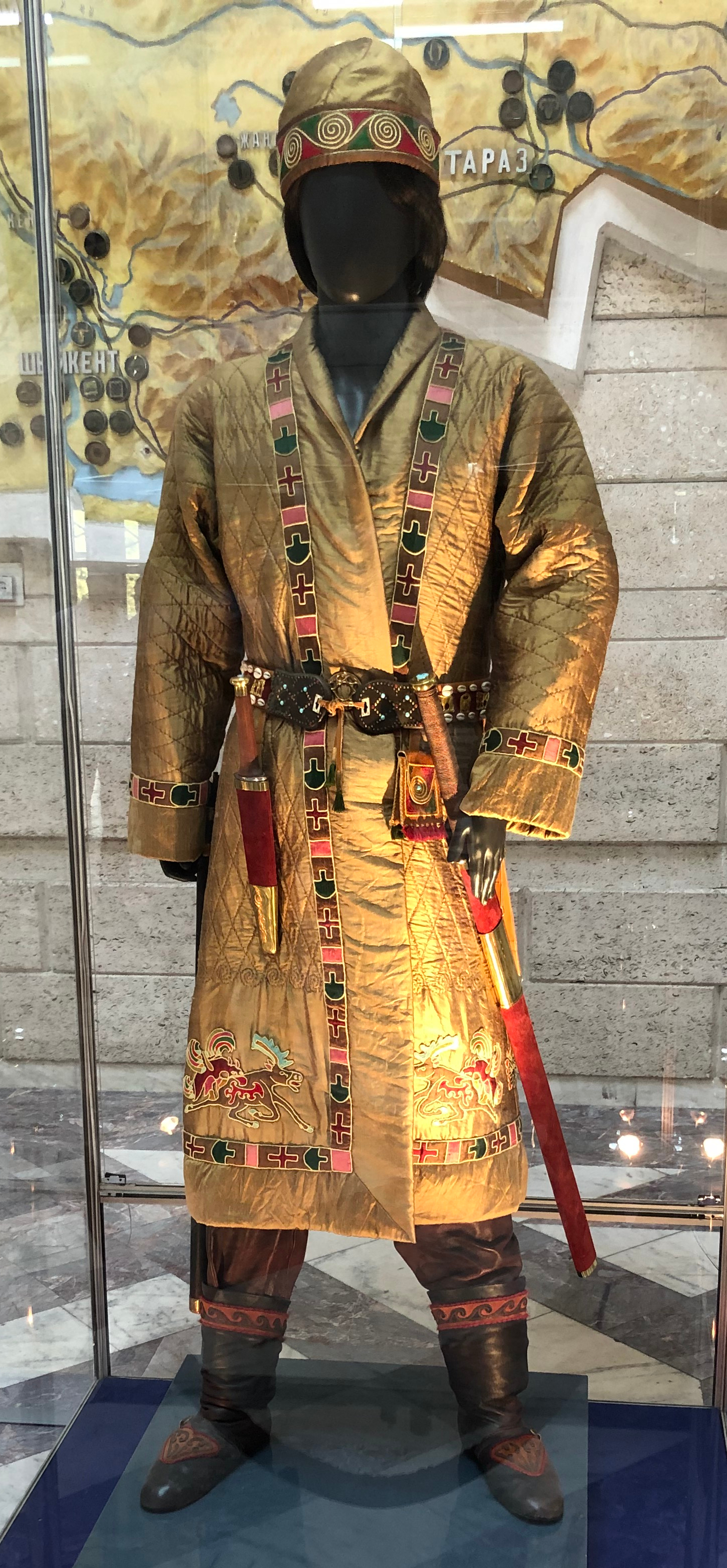
Xiongnu chief, 2nd century BC – 1st century AD. Reconstruction by archaeologist A.N. Podushkin, in the Central State Museum of Kazakhstan.

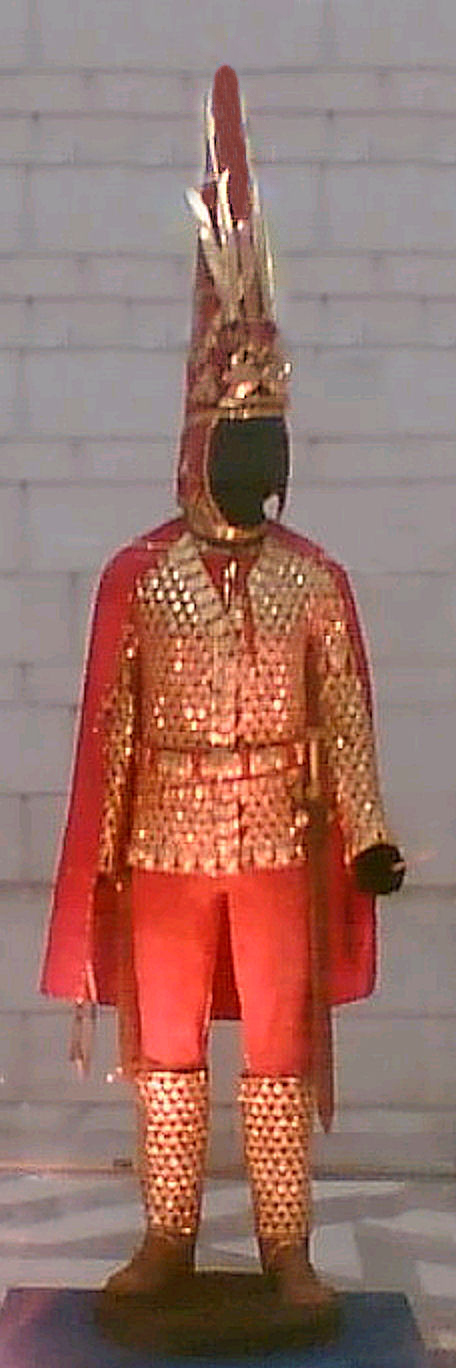
Cataphract-style parade armor of a royal Saka from the Issyk kurgan.

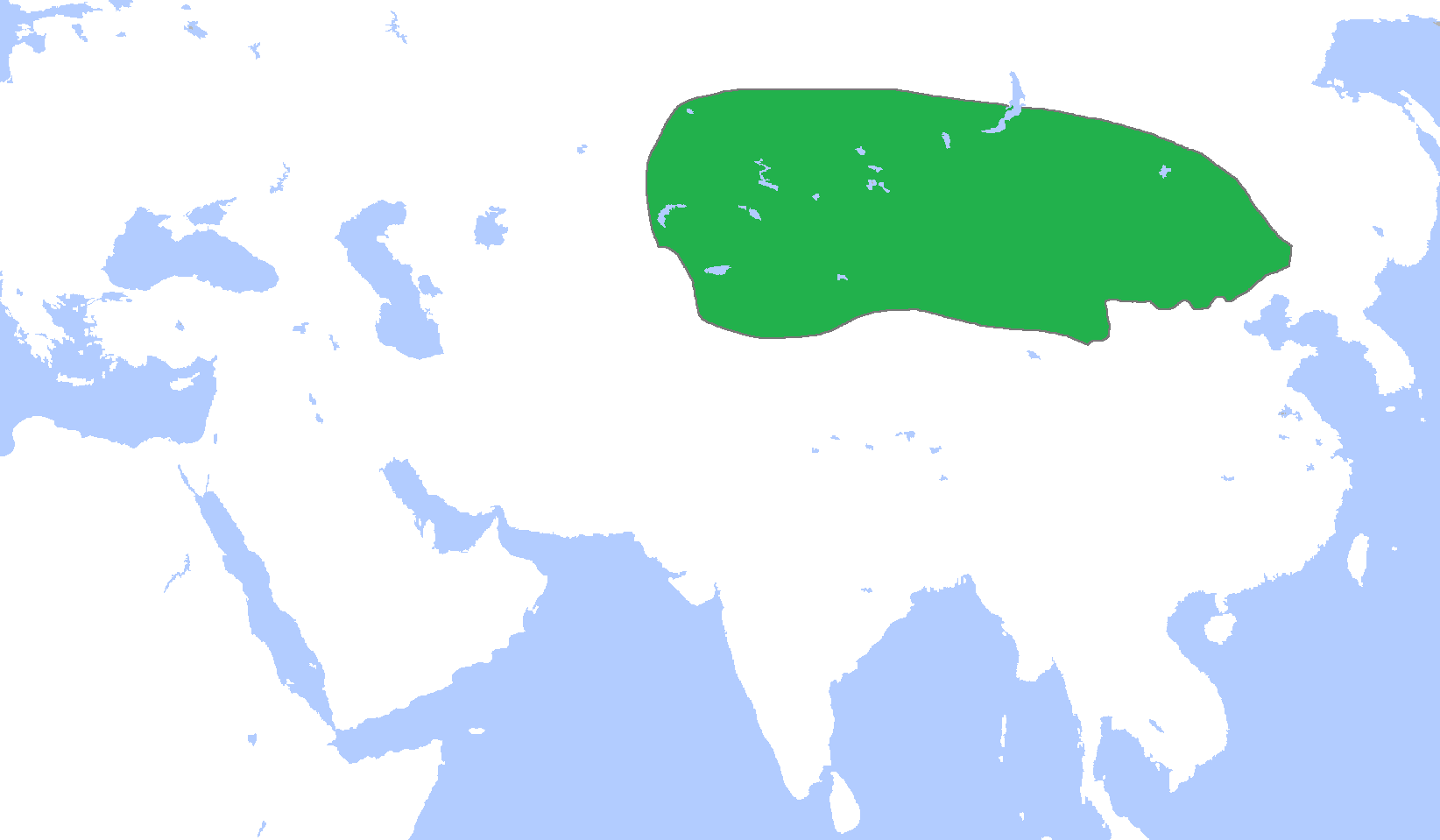
The largest extent of Xiongnu's influence in the 2nd century BC.

At the beginning of the first millennium the steppes east of the Caspian were inhabited and settled by a variety of peoples, mainly nomads speaking Indo-European and Uralic languages, including the Alans, Aorsi, Budini, Issedones/Wusun, Madjars, Massagetae and Sakas. The names, relations between and constituents of these peoples were sometimes fluid and interchangeable. Some of them formed states, including Yancai (northwest of the Aral Sea) and Kangju in the east. Over the course of several centuries the area became dominated by Turkic and other exogenous languages, which arrived with nomad invaders and settlers from the east.

Following the entry of the Huns many of the previous inhabitants migrated westward into Europe or were absorbed by the Huns. The focus of the Hun Empire gradually moved westward from the steppes into Eastern Europe.

For a few centuries events in the future Kazakhstan are unclear and frequently the subject of speculation based on mythic or apocryphal folk tales popular among various peoples that migrated westward through the steppes.

From the middle of the 2nd century the Yueban – an offshoot of the Xiongnu and therefore possibly connected to the Huns – established a state in far-eastern Kazakhstan.

Over the next few centuries peoples such as the Akatziri, Avars (known later as the Pannonian Avars; not to be confused with the Avars of the Caucasus), Sabirs and Bulgars migrated through the area and into the Caucasus and Eastern Europe.

By the beginning of the 6th century the proto-Mongolian Rouran Khaganate had annexed areas that were later part of east Kazakhstan.

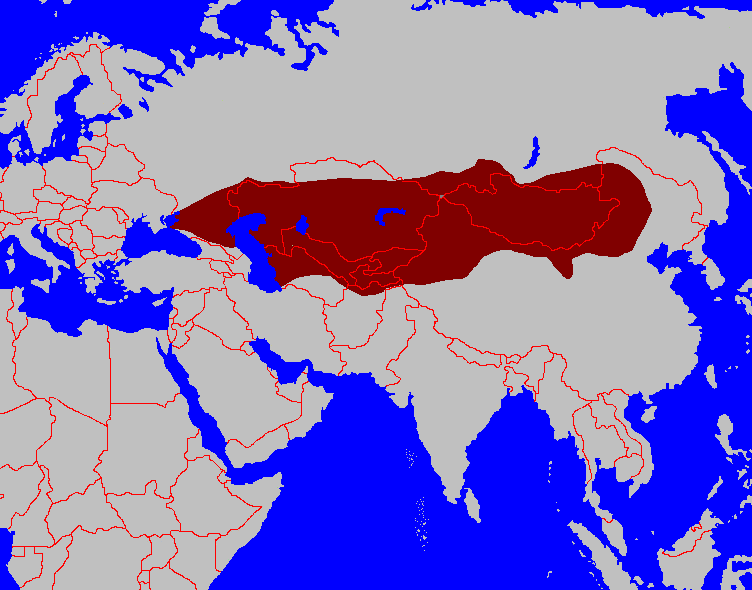
First Turkic Khaganate in 570

The Göktürks, a Turkic people formerly subject to the Rouran, migrated westward, pushing the remnants of the Huns west and southward. By the mid-6th Century, the First Turkic Khaganate was established. A few decades later, a civil war resulted in the khaganate being split, and establishment of the Eastern Turkic Khaganate and Western Turkic Khaganate. In 630 and 659, the Eastern and Western Turkic Khaganate were invaded and conquered by the Tang China. Towards the end of the 7th century, the two states were reunited in the Second Turkic Khaganate. However, the khaganate began to fragment only a few generations later.

In 766 the Oghuz Yabgu State (Oguz il) was founded, with its capital in Jankent, and came to occupy most of the later Kazakhstan. It was founded by the Oghuz Turks, refugees from the neighbouring Turgesh Kaganate. The Oghuz lost a struggle with the Karluks for control of Turgesh, other Oguz clans migrated from the Turgesh-controlled Zhetysu to the Karatau Mountains and the Chu valley, in the Issyk Kul basin.

== Cuman-Kipchak period ==
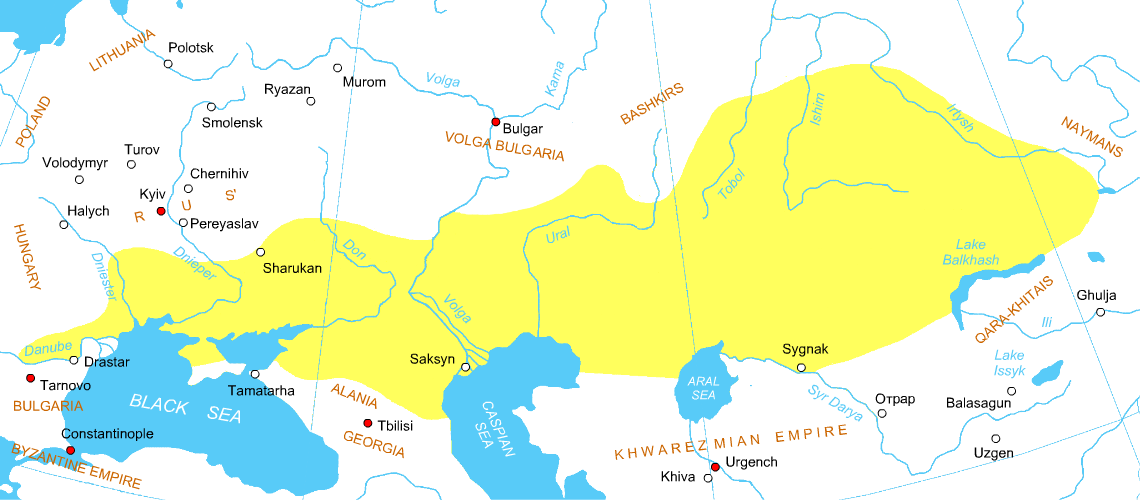
Cuman–Kipchak confederation in Eurasia circa 1200

In the eighth and ninth centuries, portions of southern Kazakhstan were conquered by Arabs who introduced Islam. The Oghuz Turks controlled western Kazakhstan from the ninth through the 11th centuries; and Turkic peoples of Kipchaks and Kimaks, controlled the east at roughly the same time. In turn the Cumans controlled western Kazakhstan from around the 12th century until the 1220s. Since then, those vast lands are came to be known as Dashti-Kipchak, or the Kipchak Steppe.

During the ninth century the Qarluq confederation formed the Qarakhanid state, which conquered Transoxiana (the area north and east of the Oxus River, the present-day Amu Darya). Beginning in the early 11th century, the Qarakhanids fought constantly among themselves and with the Seljuk Turks to the south. The Qarakhanids, who had converted to Islam, were conquered in the 1130s by the Kara-Khitan (moved west from North China). In the mid-12th century an independent state of Khorazm along the Oxus River broke away from the weakening Karakitai, but the bulk of the Kara-Khitan lasted until the Mongol invasion of Genghis Khan from 1219 to 1221.

== Mongol Empire and Golden Horde (1206–1502) ==
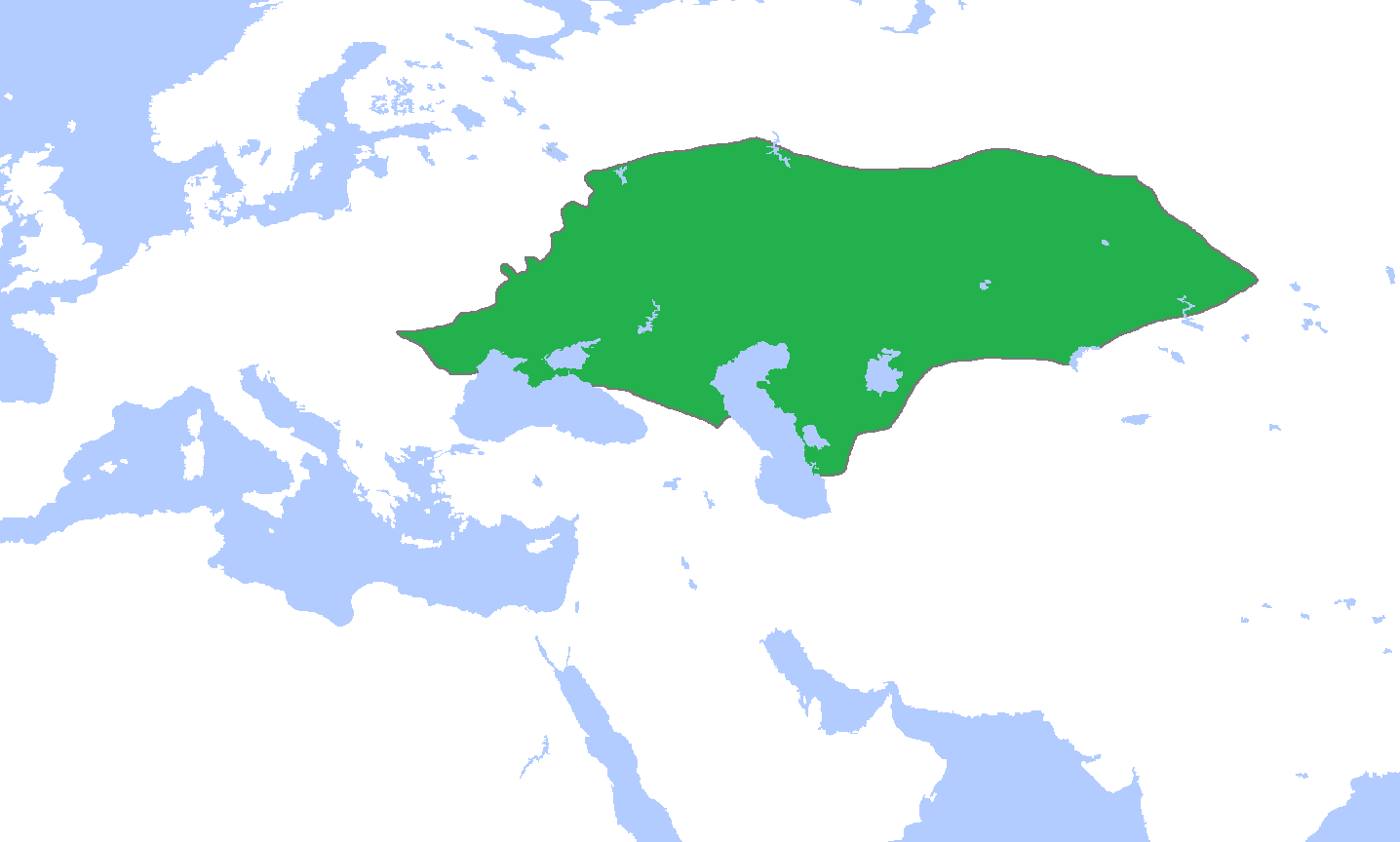
Locator map of the Golden Horde, c. 1300

At the beginning of the 13th century, the lands in the west and north of present-day Kazakhstan (the eastern part of Desht-i Kipchak) came under the rule of Jochi, the eldest son of Genghis Khan, forming the left wing of the Golden Horde ( White Horde)< the territory in the south came under the rule of Jochi’s brother Chagatai (Chagatai Khanate). The ethnic composition of the Golden Horde was heterogeneous and included sedentary peoples conquered by the Mongols, as well as masses of Turkic and Mongol tribes and clans that had not yet developed into distinct ethnic groups

A comparative analysis of published narrative texts shows that the nomadic Kazakhs perceived the history of the rise and decline of the Golden Horde, as well as the stages in the development of their own state that emerged after its fragmentation into separate parts, as a constantly recurring cyclical succession of eras. In the popular consciousness of the bearers of the oral tradition, this perception had a clearly pronounced personalized character. Consequently, the overwhelming majority of Kazakh folkloric materials devoted to the medieval history of Eurasia are associated with specific historical figures of the Ulus of Jochi or with characters closely connected to them, both in reality and in literary narrative. Among the most popular figures in the Kazakh narrative tradition are Genghis Khan (1206–1227), his eldest son Jochi (? – c. 1227), who became the subject of the musical and poetic works of many Kazakh akyns, the khans Batu (1243–1255), Jani Beg (1342–1357), and Tokhtamysh (1380–1406), Urus Khan (1368–1377), Edigu — beg (early 1390s – 1419), as well as the Samarkand emir Timur (1370–1405), who founded the Timurid state in Transoxiana.

=== Formation of the Ulus of Jochi ===
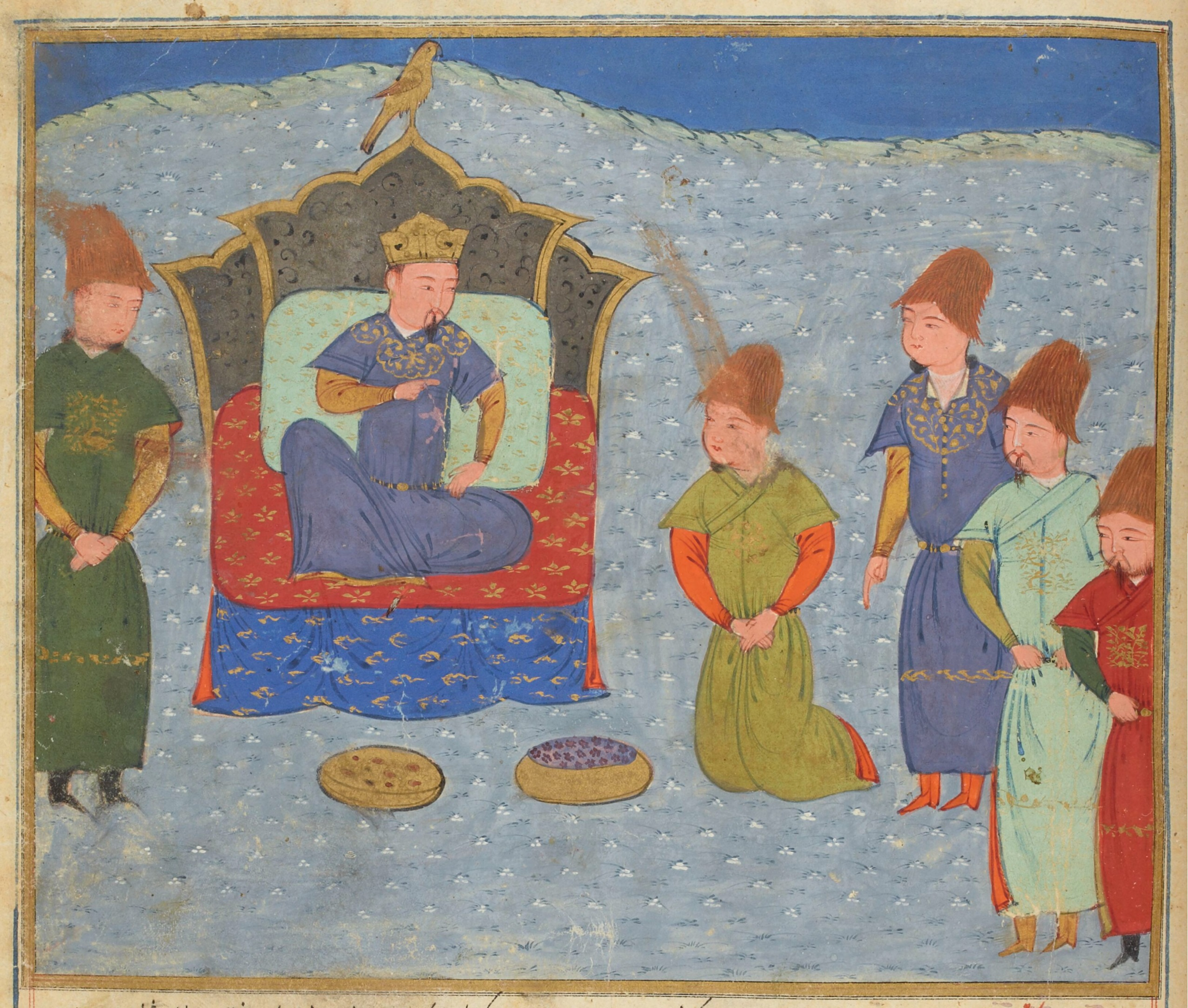
Batu Khan on the throne of the Golden Horde

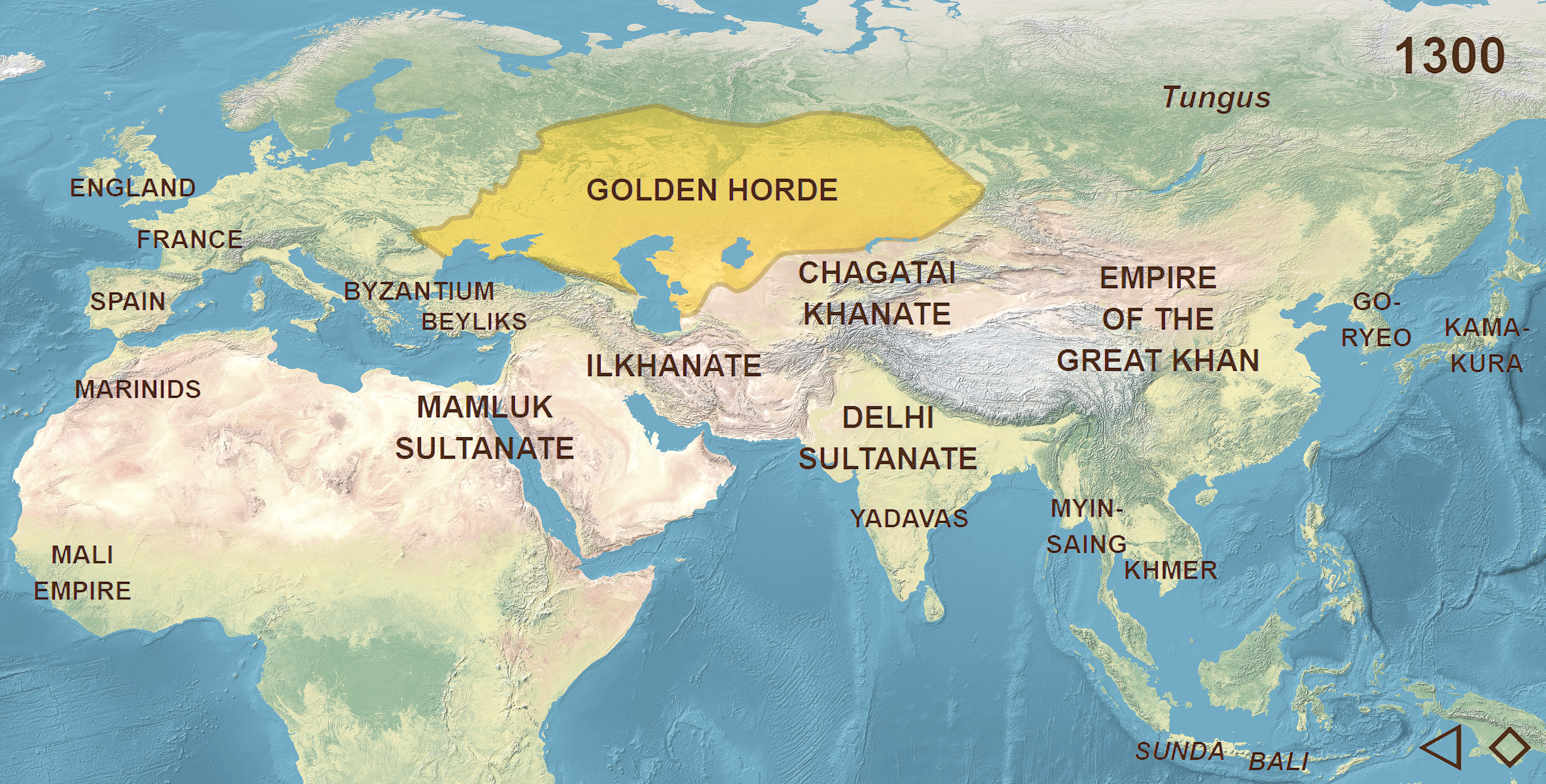
The Golden Horde c. 1300

The state of the Ulus of Jochi encompassed the entire Great Steppe — from the Danube in the west to the Irtysh in the east. The state was officially known as the Ulu Ulus ("Great Ulus").

After the death of Jochi Khan, his position was taken by Batu. Orda (Jochi’s eldest son) voluntarily ceded precedence to his younger brother. They repeatedly yielded seniority to one another out of mutual respect. Their dispute was ultimately resolved by their grandfather Genghis Khan. At the same time, the Ulus of Jochi was effectively divided into two uluses (peoples). According to Rashid al-Din, "one half of Jochi Khan’s army was commanded by him (Orda), and the other half by Batu". Batu, who did not display exceptional military talents but possessed notable administrative and political abilities, managed during the years 1242–1256, without waging major wars, to establish suzerainty over the Russian principalities, Georgia, Armenia, the Seljuk Sultanate of Rum, and several regions of Iran. A number of Golden Horde cities are associated with his name.

Good relations began to develop between Karakorum and Sarai. However, Möngke, fearing that Batu’s status had become too elevated, sought to equalize his rights with those of the rulers of the other Chinggisid uluses. First, payments of revenues from Mongolia and China were refused on the pretext that such payments were draining the imperial treasury. He then dispatched officials to the Ulus of Jochi and its vassal states to conduct a census. In 1253, Batu received an order to provide 20% of his warriors for the campaign in Iran. Batu could not resist this demand, since disobedience to the khan was punishable — a policy he himself had previously helped to enforce. At the same time, Batu did not seek the independence of the Golden Horde and regarded it as part of the Mongol Empire.

After Batu’s death, Berke became khan. Berke was the first ruler to come to power without confirmation from Karakorum. Kublai, preoccupied with numerous problems in Mongolia and China, was forced to recognize him because he lacked the means to remove him. Coins bearing Berke’s tamga began to be minted in Bulgar, and when the struggle between Kublai and Ariq Böke erupted, Berke began minting coins in the name of Ariq Böke, thereby recognizing him as the more legitimate claimant to the Mongol throne. Kublai responded by confiscating the possessions of the Jochids in the Chinese province of Shanxi, while in Bukhara the Golden Horde garrison under Jochid control was massacred. Nevertheless, Berke had little interest in these cities, which generated relatively small revenues for the Golden Horde treasury. In response, Berke eliminated Mongol tax collectors in the Russian principalities.

Having become convinced that there was no threat to his authority from the Mongol Empire, Berke attempted to recover the Jochid territories lost under the policies of Güyük and Möngke, foremost among them Azerbaijan, which at that time was under the control of the Ilkhan Hulagu. As a result, Berke became the first to initiate a war between the uluses of the Mongol Empire. The causes of the war included disputed territories not only in Azerbaijan, but also in the Caucasus, as well as several regions of Iran and territories of the Seljuk Sultanate of Rum. However, after Batu’s death these lands had been transferred to Hulagu. Convinced that Kublai would be unable to provide support as his elder brother had done, Berke decided to reclaim what he regarded as his lawful possessions.

In 1269, at a kurultai on the Talas, Mengu-Timur, Baraq, and Kaidu recognized one another as independent rulers and concluded an alliance against the ruler of the Mongol Empire, Kublai, in the event that he attempted to challenge their independence. Mengu-Timur, who had effectively become an independent monarch and sovereign khan, adopted the honorific title "just great khan". By virtue of such an exalted title, the ruler could govern a state also designated by the elevated epithet "Great Ulus" (Ulu Ulus, Kazakh: Ұлығ Ұлыс). According to the records of Chokan Valikhanov, the Kazakhs in their "jirah" referred to the Horde as "Ұлығ Ұлыс Ноғайлының Ау(ы)р йурт".

In the 1320s–1330s, Öz Beg Khan carried out a series of administrative reforms in the Golden Horde aimed at centralizing authority, and under his rule Islam became the state religion.

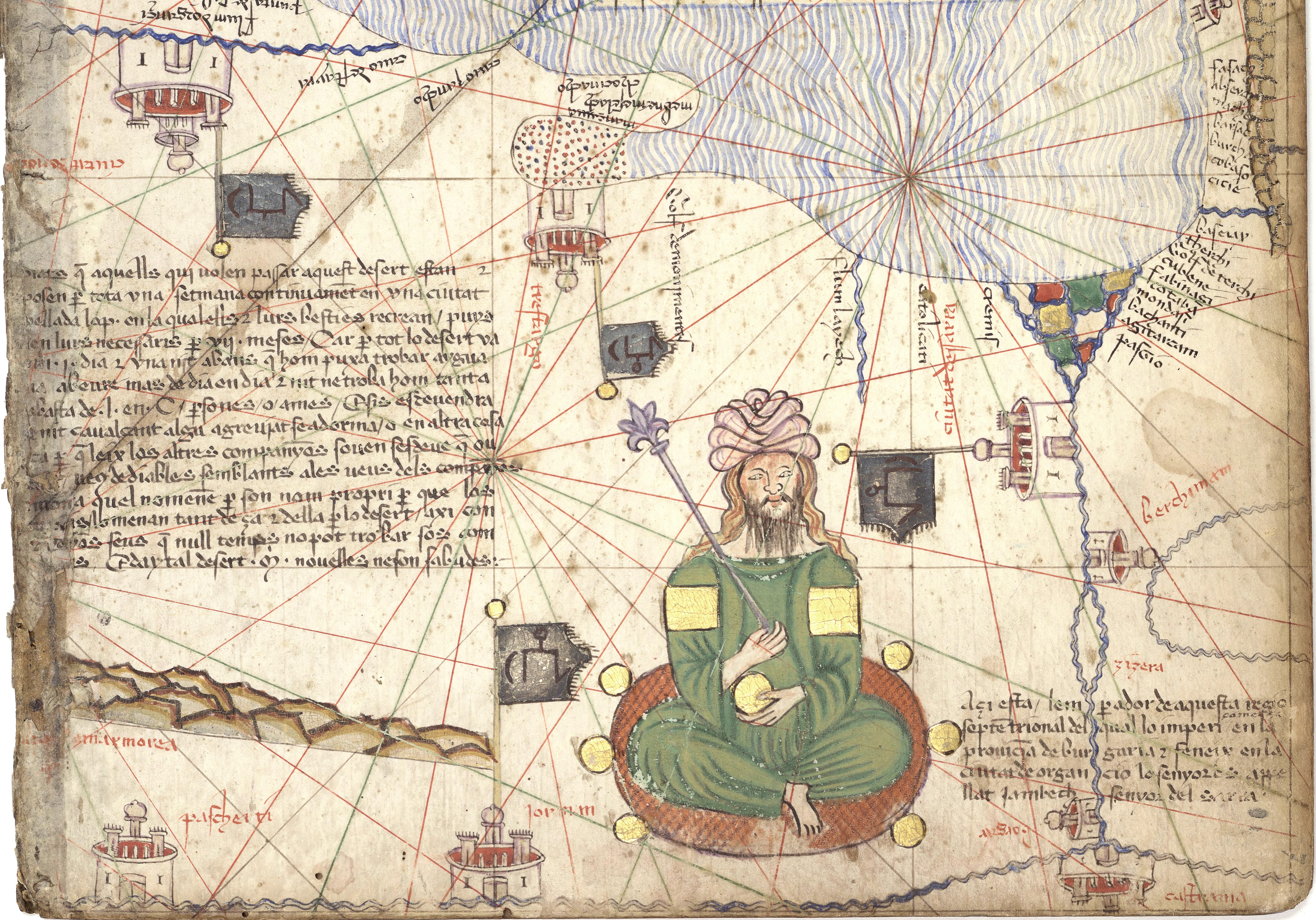
Jani Beg of the Golden Horde, depicted in the Catalan Atlas (1375), with the flag "Here resides the emperor of this northern region whose empire starts in the province of Bulgaria and ends at the city of Organcio. The sovereign is named Jambech, Lord of the Sarra."

An enormous number of works of Kazakh folklore were devoted to the ruler Jani Beg. "The time of Jani Beg’s rule, when the two kindred hordes of the Nogais and the Kazakhs lived together," wrote Chokan Valikhanov in the mid-19th century, "is celebrated in Kazakh poems as a golden age. Most of the legends belong to this period."

After the death of Jani Beg, the Golden Horde began to weaken rapidly, eventually leading to its disintegration and the formation in the 15th century of independent Turkic states in Crimea, the Volga region, the eastern Desht-i Kipchak, and Siberia, including the Kazakh Khanate.

=== Blue Horde. Accession of Urus Khan ===
In the late 1350s and early 1360s, a prolonged period of turmoil ("Great Troubles") began in the Horde. The rulers of the Blue Horde, refusing to recognize the authority of the rapidly changing khans in the Volga region, proclaimed themselves independent monarchs and adopted the title of khan. By this time, the descendants of Orda had disappeared from the political scene, and leadership of the Blue Horde passed to the descendants of Tuqa-Timur — the 13th son of Jochi. The most prominent ruler of this dynasty was Khan Urus. The word "Urus" has several meanings in the Turkic languages. One meaning is "battle" or "warlike", and therefore the name Urus-Muhammad may be interpreted as "Warlike Muhammad". Another interpretation of the word "Urus" in Turkic languages is connected with the assumption that his mother was a Russian princess; this fact may later have been used to justify his claims in Russia. A third version interprets the name in the Kipchak-Turkic tradition as meaning "unity" and "blessing". At the same time, there was no uniform spelling of Urus Khan’s name on his coins: variants such as "Urus", "Arus", "Urs", and "Ursh" are attested.

Urus became khan of the Blue Horde in 1361. Muslim chroniclers described him as a strong and resolute ruler. Under him, the authority of the khan in the Blue Horde began to strengthen, and he sought to obtain the throne of Sarai. From the Eastern Desht-i Kipchak, he advanced westward, where he seized the throne of Sarai and began minting his own coins. Urus left his governors in the Volga region and himself returned to Ulytau and the Syr Darya regions. However, he failed to overcome the Golden Horde strongman Mamai, a representative of the Blue Horde (Kok Orda), and was therefore forced to withdraw to the Syr Darya territories. Prior to his arrival, the sons of Urus Khan — Kutluk-Buga and Toqtakia had twice defeated Tokhtamysh, who fled to Timur. Urus Khan sent envoys to Timur demanding the extradition of the fugitive, threatening war otherwise. Timur gave an evasive reply and began preparing his troops for a campaign. In several minor battles, Urus Khan’s detachments defeated Timur’s commanders. Having lost many men, horses, and supplies, Timur retreated in the winter of 1376–1377 to Samarkand and Kesh. In 1377, Urus Khan died. According to Natanzi, this padishah was "excessively stubborn, wrathful, and powerful".

=== Under Tokhtamysh. Decline of the Golden Horde ===
What Urus had failed to accomplish was achieved by another representative of the Blue Horde — Tokhtamysh. In the same year, with the support of the most powerful ruler of the East, the emir of Samarkand Timur, the Mangyshlak Tuqa-Timurid Tokhtamysh was placed on the throne. From the capital of the Blue Horde, Sighnaq, Tokhtamysh launched a campaign westward and captured Sarai. He soon united all the Jochid possessions under his rule into a single empire, restoring strong khanal authority.

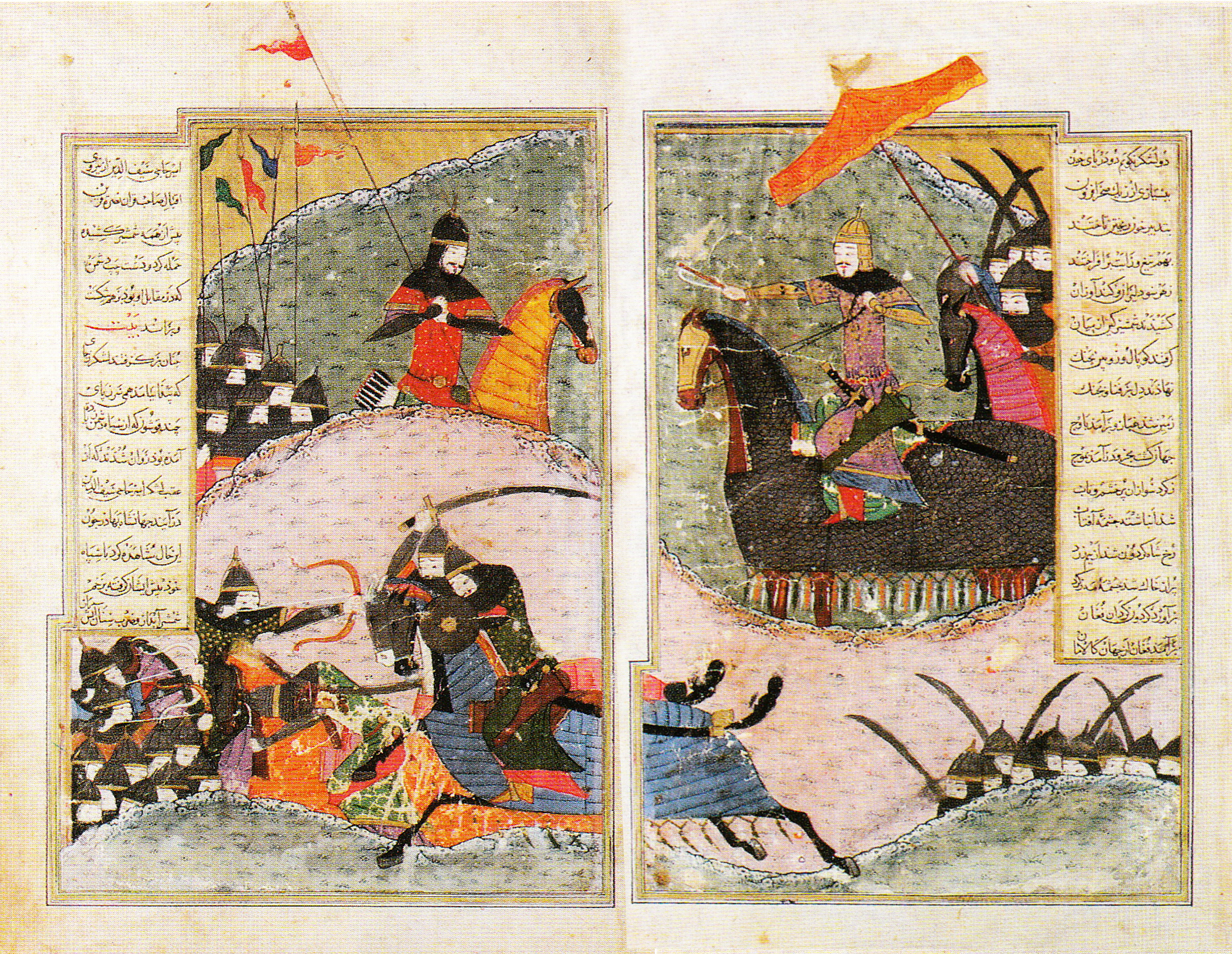
Battle between Tokhtamysh (left) and Timur (right) on 18 June 1391. Zafarnama ("Book of Victories")

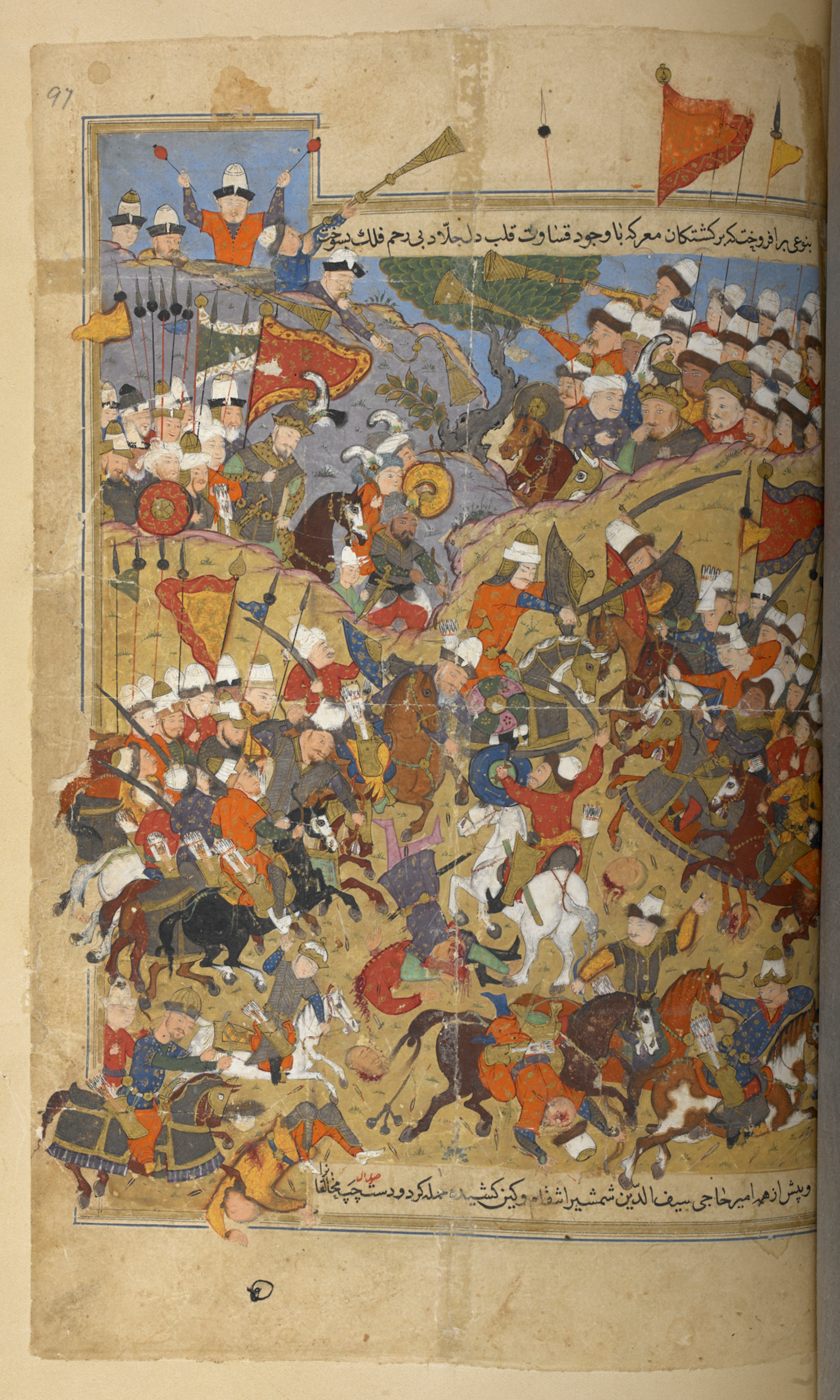
Battle between the army of Timur and the Tatar troops of Khan Tokhtamysh (1387). Rawzat al-Safa

Tokhtamysh began pursuing an active foreign policy. In 1380, Mamai suffered a defeat at the hands of the Russian forces, but this did not save Moscow from Tokhtamysh’s invasion, and in 1382 Tokhtamysh burned Moscow and once again compelled Russia to pay tribute to the Golden Horde until 1480. However, by 1395 Tokhtamysh entered into direct confrontation with Timur and was defeated, losing the throne of the Golden Horde as a result. After him, no one succeeded in achieving authority recognized throughout the entire Ulus of Jochi, and the Golden Horde began to disintegrate. Timur installed in Sarai, which by that time was effectively under his control, his own protégés from the Blue Horde — descendants of Urus Khan — but they failed to restore the former greatness of the Ulus of Jochi.

After Tokhtamysh’s overthrow in the Blue Horde, it effectively came under the control of the emir Edigu. While Tokhtamysh ruled the White Horde (the western wing), Edigu maintained neutrality. However, after Timur’s campaign of 1396 and the subsequent enthronement of Koirichak, Edigu killed him and installed Timur-Qutlugh as khan. When Tokhtamysh attempted to regain the throne, Edigu and his supporters defeated him. Tokhtamysh was even forced to enter into an agreement with the Grand Duchy of Lithuania: in exchange for restoration to the throne, he promised to transfer to Lithuania all the Russian lands subject to the Horde, including Novgorod, Ryazan, and even Moscow. Edigu defeated them and thus effectively became the inadvertent savior of the northeastern Russia lands from the rule of Catholic Lithuania.

In 1405, an envoy from Tokhtamysh arrived before Timur. Timur forgave Tokhtamysh and promised to restore him to the Jochid throne; however, in February 1405, during one of his campaigns against China, Timur died in Otrar. Soon afterward, his empire also began to disintegrate. A year later, Tokhtamysh himself died.

The constant struggle of Edigu against numerous rivals, and at times against his own protégés who escaped his control, prevented him from stabilizing the situation in the Ulus of Jochi, although he did undertake certain measures in this direction. Edigu attempted to strengthen the economy of the Golden Horde. At the beginning of the 15th century, the cities carried out another monetary reform. However, the consequences of Timur’s campaigns were too severe for Edigu’s efforts to achieve notable success. The economy was further weakened by another deterioration in relations with the Italian trading colonies. In 1420, the aged Manghit emir Edigu himself was killed. Despite his undoubtedly exceptional personal qualities and charisma, he never succeeded in restoring the former greatness of the Ulus of Jochi for a number of reasons. Edigu also no longer thought in imperial terms and sought to control the Ulus of Jochi not so much as a sole ruler, but rather as the leader of autonomous ulus rulers subordinate to him.

Likewise, Edigu’s rivals, the "Tokhtamyshids", unlike their father Tokhtamysh, were no longer bearers of an imperial ideology, just as other representatives of their generation were not. Consequently, they were unable to consistently construct a coherent system of state administration, legal regulation of relations with subjects, or organization of the economic sphere. For this reason, lacking both effective mechanisms of power and even a clear objective (such as Tokhtamysh had possessed), they entered into conflict with Edigu, his protégés, and one another. According to the Russian historian Roman Pochekaev, all parties ultimately lost, and as a result the Golden Horde in the first quarter of the 15th century was transformed from a once centralized and developed state into a "chiefdom", effectively reverting in terms of authority and governance to conditions resembling those before the formation of the empire of Genghis Khan at the beginning of the 13th century. Subsequent political developments only accelerated this process.

The Blue Horde (Kok-Orda) was also weakened by the wars with Timur. In 1423–1424, Urus's grandson and the son of Koirichak, Barak, seized power in the Blue Horde. Later, after defeating the khans Hundayt and Ulugh Muhammad, Barak captured Sarai and "ascended the khan’s throne in Desht-i Kipchak". However, in 1428 he was defeated by Ulugh Muhammad and was forced to retreat to the Blue Horde. Abandoning further struggle, he directed his efforts against the Timurid rulers of Samarkand. These were the final years of the Blue Horde’s existence. After Barak, power in the Eastern Desht-i Kipchak passed from the Tuqa-Timurids to the Shaybanids. Barak Khan had one daughter and three sons, one of whom, Abu Sa'id, "who was also called Janibek", became one of the founders of the Kazakh Khanate.

== Kazakh Khanate (1465–1718) ==
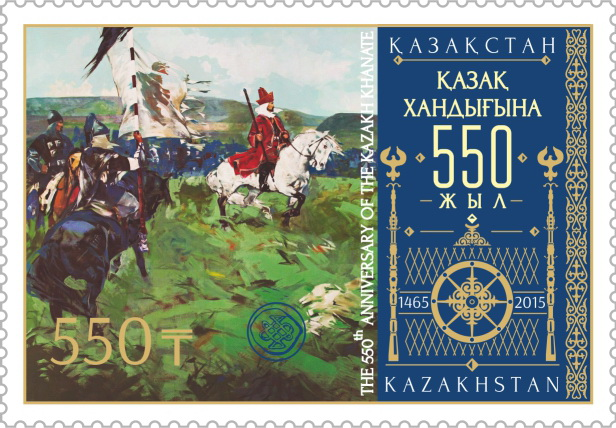
Postage stamp dedicated to the 550th anniversary of the Kazakh Khanate, 2015

The emergence of the Kazakh Khanate was preceded by a prolonged struggle for power within the Ulus of Jochi in the 15th century. With the support of Manghit emirs, victory in the struggle for the Eastern Desht-i Kipchak was achieved by Abu’l-Khayr of the Shaybanid dynasty. According to some historians, this was one of the rare cases in which members of this dynasty were able to establish real and sustained authority over the nomads of the Eastern Desht-i Kipchak. In the 1420s–1450s, Abu’l-Khayr Khan significantly expanded his domains, including subjugating the lands of the descendants of Urus Khan along the Syr Darya. However, the sultans Kerei and Janibek did not recognize his authority. Around 1459 (according to another version, in 1429 they were taken by Alash-Bahadur with him), they migrated to neighboring Moghulistan. The Moghul ruler Esen Buqa Khan received them and granted them pastures in the Chu–Ili interfluve.

Shoqan Walikhanov believed that when the Golden Horde began to disintegrate, the reasons why Kazakhs created the large tribal unions which composed the Kazakh Khanate were in order to retain their nomadic territories and secure their rights in the lands where they migrated.

In 1500, the Uzbeks concluded peace with the Kazakhs, and the Kazakh Khanate gains its sovereignty from Shaybanids control. All the former Uzbek Khanate lands in the north of Syr Darya were transferred to the Kazakh Khanate.

In 1499, Muhammad Shaybani, the grandson of Abu'l-Khayr, was forced to march south with the remaining loyal steppe tribes into Mawarannahr. There, he succeeded in conquering the fragmented state of the Timurids, which had collapsed after the death of Timur. He moved the capital of his state from Sygnak to Bukhara, where in 1500 he established a new state—the Bukhara Khanate. The nomadic Desht-Kipchak tribes that had joined Shaybani mixed with the local sedentary population—the Turkic-speaking Sarts, the ancient Turkic Karluks, and, as victors, they gave their new people the name Uzbeks.

In the early 16th century, Kazakhs transformed the Khanate into a nomadic empire stretching across the steppes east of the Caspian Sea and north of the Aral Sea as far as the upper Irtysh River and the western approaches to the Altai Mountains. During the reigns of Burunduk Khan (ruled 1488–1509) and Kasym Khan (1509–18), the Kazakhs were the masters of virtually the entire steppe region, reportedly able to bring 200,000 cavalry into the field and feared by all their neighbours. Many historians consider Kasym Khan’s leadership the starting point of a distinct and sovereign Kazakh state. His influence extended Kazakh authority from the southeastern regions of modern Kazakhstan to the Ural Mountains. Mirza Muhammad Haidar wrote in his Tarikh-i-Rashidi that:

Kásim Khán became the absolute ruler over all of Dasht-i-Kipchák. His army numbered more than a million men, gaining such fame and power as no one had since Juji Khán.

— Mirza Muhammad Haidar Dughlat

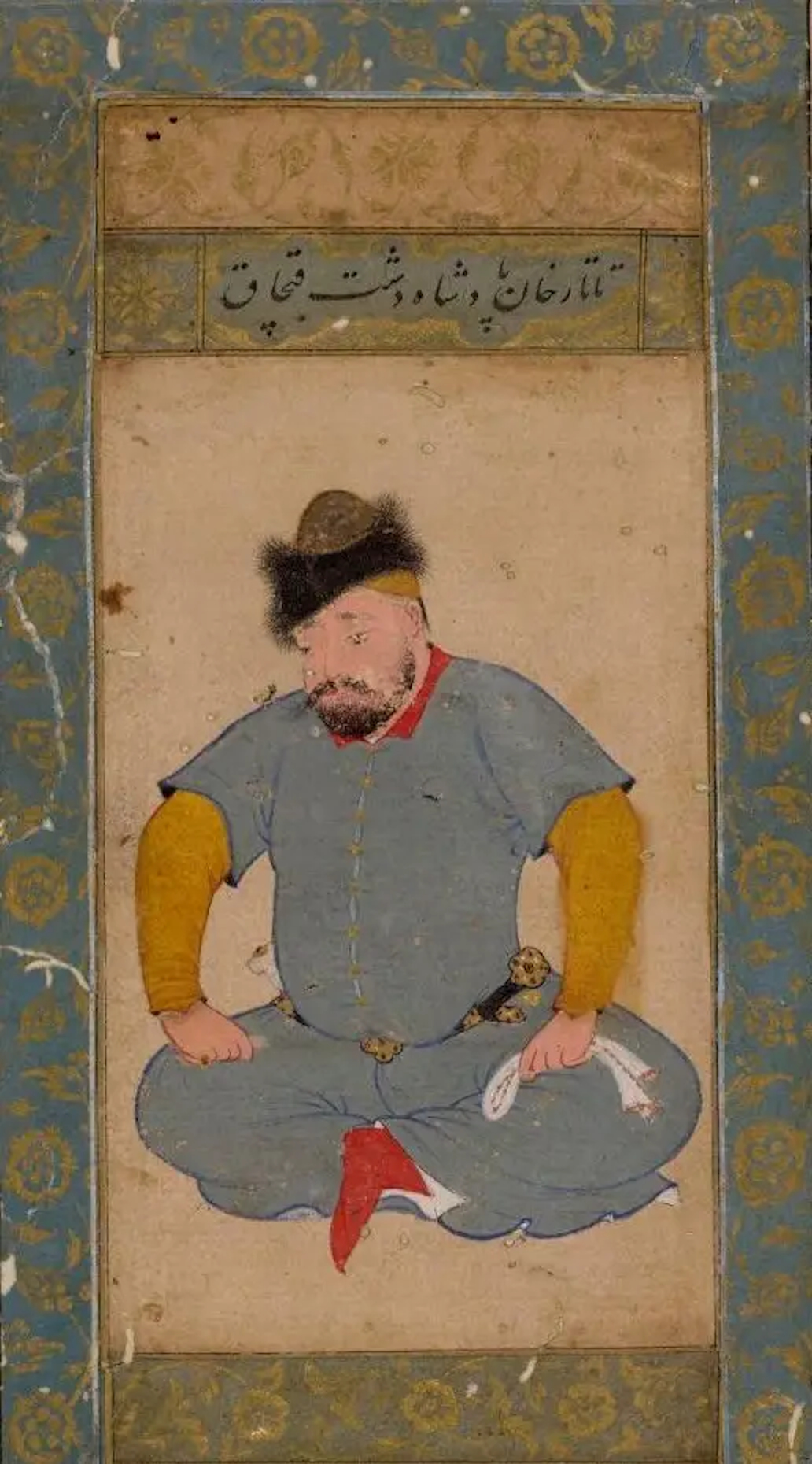
Padishah of Desht-i Qipchaq. Portrait of a Kazakh khan, 1550.

During the reign of Kasym Khan (1511–1523), the khanate expanded considerably. Numerous victories in wars against neighbouring countries made the Khanate's reputation and country well known even in Western Europe. The first Kazakh code of laws, Qasym Khannyn Qasqa Zholy (Bright Road of Kasym Khan), was also established in 1520.

Between 1522 and 1538, the Khanate experienced its first civil war.

The khanate is described in historical texts such as the Tarikh-i-Rashidi (1541–1545) by Muhammad Haidar Dughlat and Zhamigi-at-Tavarikh (1598–1599) by Kadyrgali Kosynuli Zhalayir.

During the reign of the three sons of Kasym Khan, the authority of the khan weakened somewhat, leading to the eventual fragmentation of the Kazakh Khanate into three distinct "hordes": the Great Horde in southeastern Kazakhstan north of the Tien Shan, the Middle Horde in the central steppe near the Aral Sea, and the Little Horde between the Aral Sea and the Ural River. In these regions, the khan’s power was often constrained by tribal leaders, known as sultans, and even more so by the beys and batyrs, heads of the clan-based communities. Although the khans nominally commanded a formidable military, their authority relied heavily on the loyalty of these local leaders.

Haqnazar Khan, the final son of Kasym Khan to rule, emerged as a significant figure in the late 16th century. His reign marked a pivotal moment in the history of the Kazakh Khanate, as he faced numerous challenges and was able to reunite the fractured Kazakh hordes. His reign was marked not only by the reunification of the Kazakh Khanate but also by his aggressive military campaigns, which included systematic raids into Transoxania, a trend that continued under his successors, including Tauekel Khan, who even temporarily captured Samarkand. Expanding his influence beyond the steppes, Haqnazar extended his control to not only the Kazakh people but also neighboring groups such as the Bashkirs, Kyrgyz, and Nogais. His territorial reach grew to encompass key regions including the Khanates of Kazan, Sibir, and Astrakhan, as well as important cities like Bukhara, Khiva, and Tashkent.

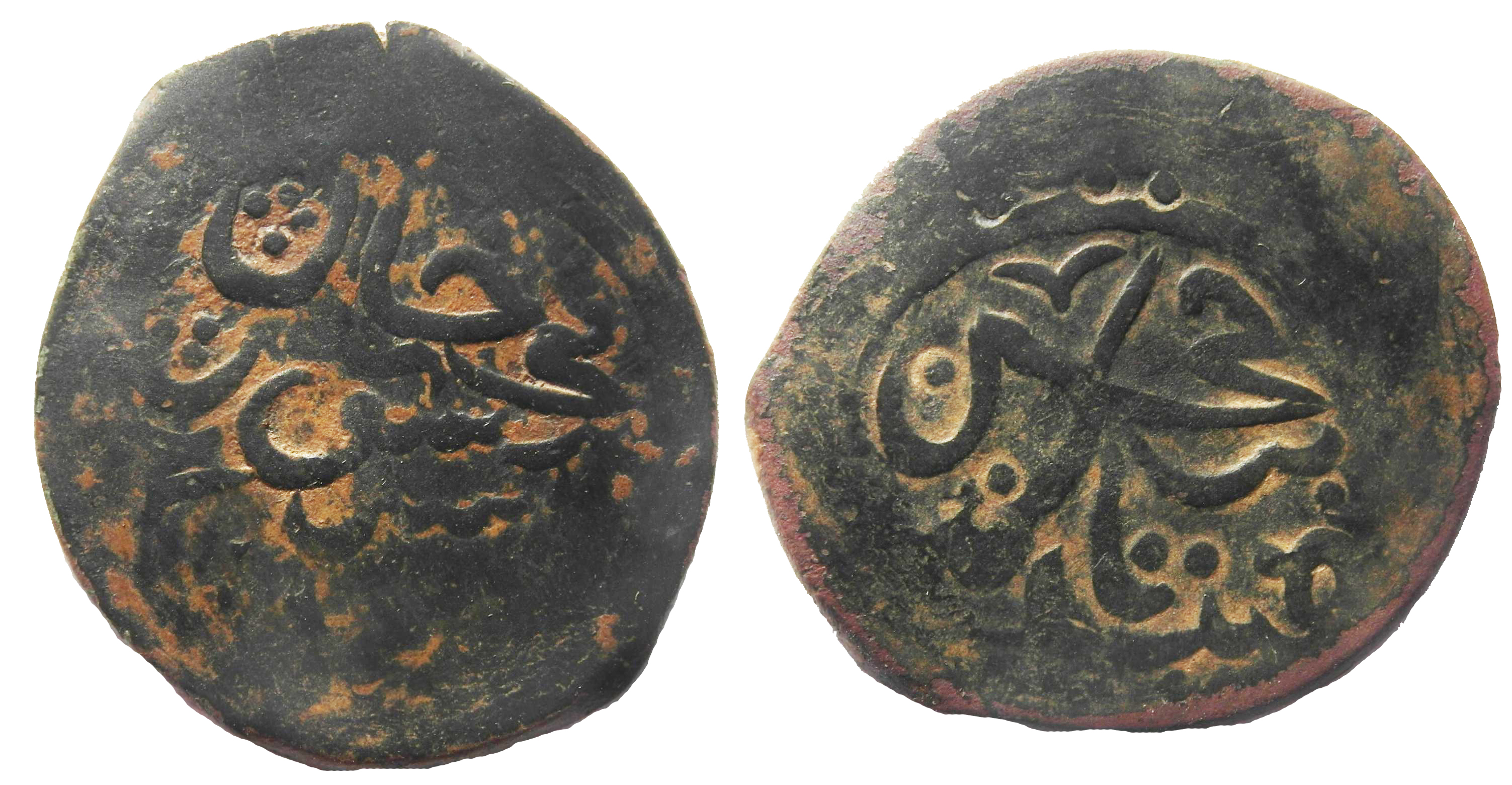
Coins of Tursun Khan, who minted his own coinage in Tashkent

His successors continued these military campaigns. In 1598, under Tauekel Khan, Tashkent became part of the Kazakh Khanate, which later made it the capital of the state. The ruler of Tashkent was the outstanding Kazakh statesman and public figure Tole Bi Alibekuly (1663–1756), from the Dulat tribe of the Senior Zhuz. During his rule, many architectural structures were erected in Tashkent, which are now historical landmarks of the city. Tole Bi was buried in Tashkent, and his mausoleum is considered one of the city's key attractions.

According to Russian envoys, Tauke received a 10,000-strong army from the Bukhara ruler Subhan Quli Khan, with which he launched a campaign against the Dzungars. This campaign was successful. Favorable conditions allowed the Kazakhs of the Senior Zhuz to regain previously lost territories; in particular, the region around the Chu River and Talas River served as winter pastures for Kazakh tribes.. Tauke Khan pursued an active foreign policy and intervened in the issue of succession in the Moghul state, where he helped Khudabanda Sultan seize power in Chalysh and Turfan. He also maintained diplomatic relations with the Russian state in the west, resulting in a total of five embassies.

To strengthen the internal foundations of the state, Tauke Khan initiated the creation of a new legal code for the Kazakh Khanate, known as the "Jeti Jargy". Unlike his predecessors, who generally relied on their Chinggisid clan elite ("Aq süyek"), Tauke placed emphasis on the elite of another group, the "Qara süyek", namely the tribal aristocracy of biys. The famous biys Tole, Kazybek, and Aiteke became an important support base for Tauke Khan.

As a result of Tauke Khan’s initiatives, the Kazakh Khanate was strengthened. It is believed that under his rule the khanate became powerful, enjoyed respect among the people, and maintained an army of 80,000 men. Russian sources mention 25–32 cities that were under his control. As his main headquarters, Tauke chose the city of Turkestan.. After Tauke’s death in 1715/1718, the Kazakh Khanate lost its unity, and the three hordes effectively became separate khanates.

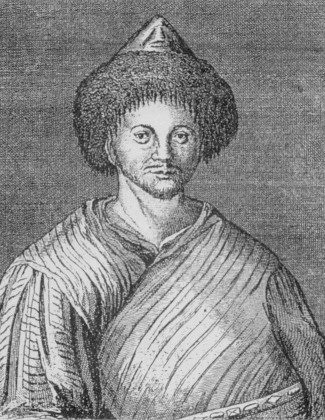
Abulkhair Khan, Khan of the Little Horde

The beginning of the 18th century marked the zenith of the Kazakh Khanate. During this period the Little Horde participated in the 1723–1730 war against the Dzungar Khanate, following their "Great Disaster" invasion of Kazakh territory. Under the leadership of Abul Khair Khan, the Kazakhs won major victories over the Dzungar at the Bulanty River in 1726 and at the Battle of Añyraqai in 1729.

Ablai Khan participated in the most significant battles against the Dzungars from the 1720s to the 1750s, for which he was declared a "batyr" ("hero") by the people. He later became the last khan whose authority was recognised across the Kazakh steppe, ruling the Middle Zhuz from 1771 to 1781. In 1740, Ablai had accepted Russian suzerainty, while pursuing a policy of balancing between Russian Empire and Qing dynasty, which for a time allowed the Kazakh Khanate to preserve relative autonomy. After his death, his son Vali Khan (1781–1819) abandoned an independent policy and acknowledged Russian authority.

In 1822, the Khanate institution among the Kazakh Hordes was abolished, sparking the uprising of Sultan Qasym in 1824–1827. The final attempt to restore the Khanate was led by Sultan Kenesary Qasymov, who proclaimed himself khan in 1837 and conducted an armed struggle against Russian authorities until his death in 1847.

== Russian Empire (1822–1917) ==
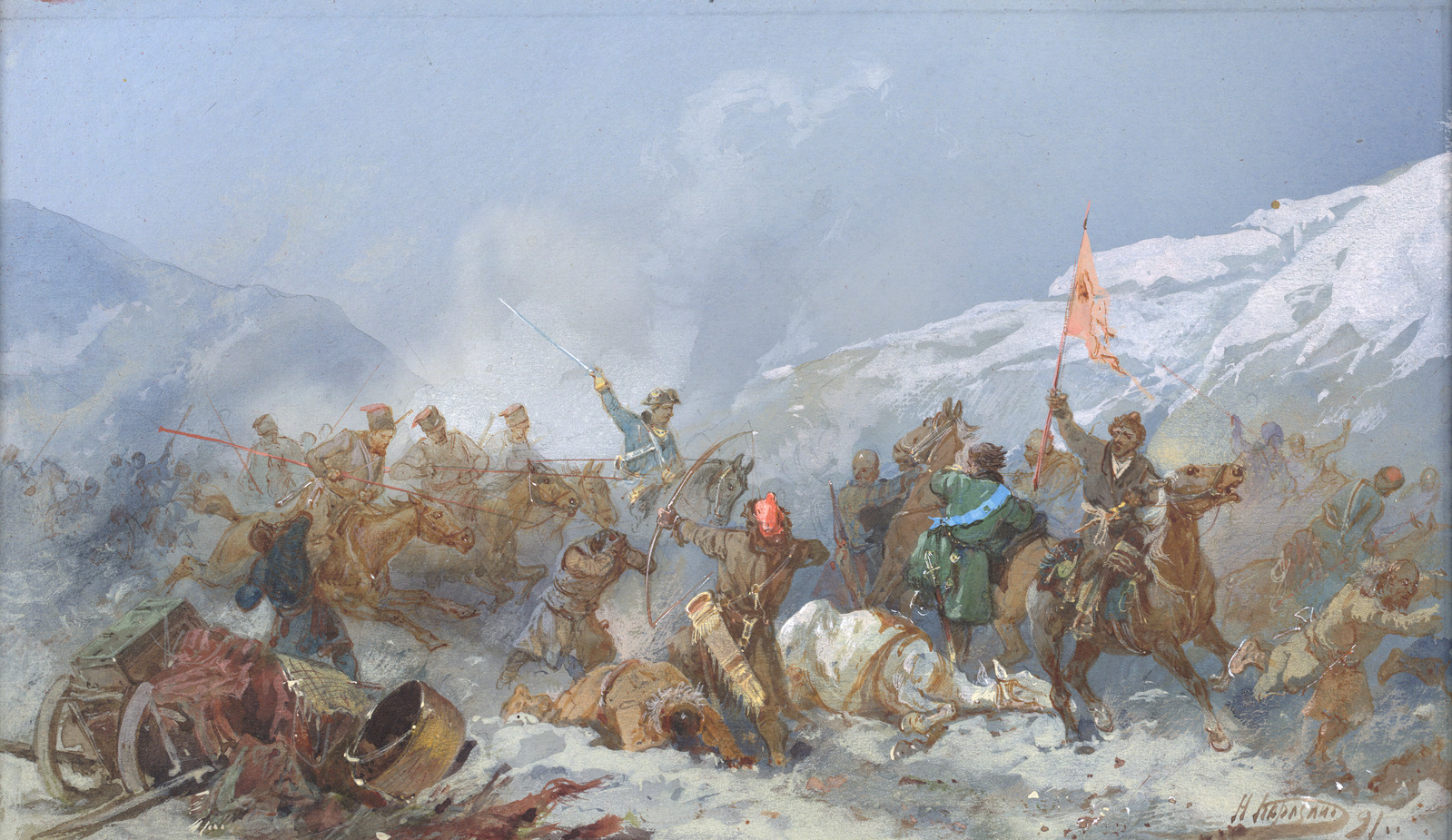
Battle with Pugachev’s rebels

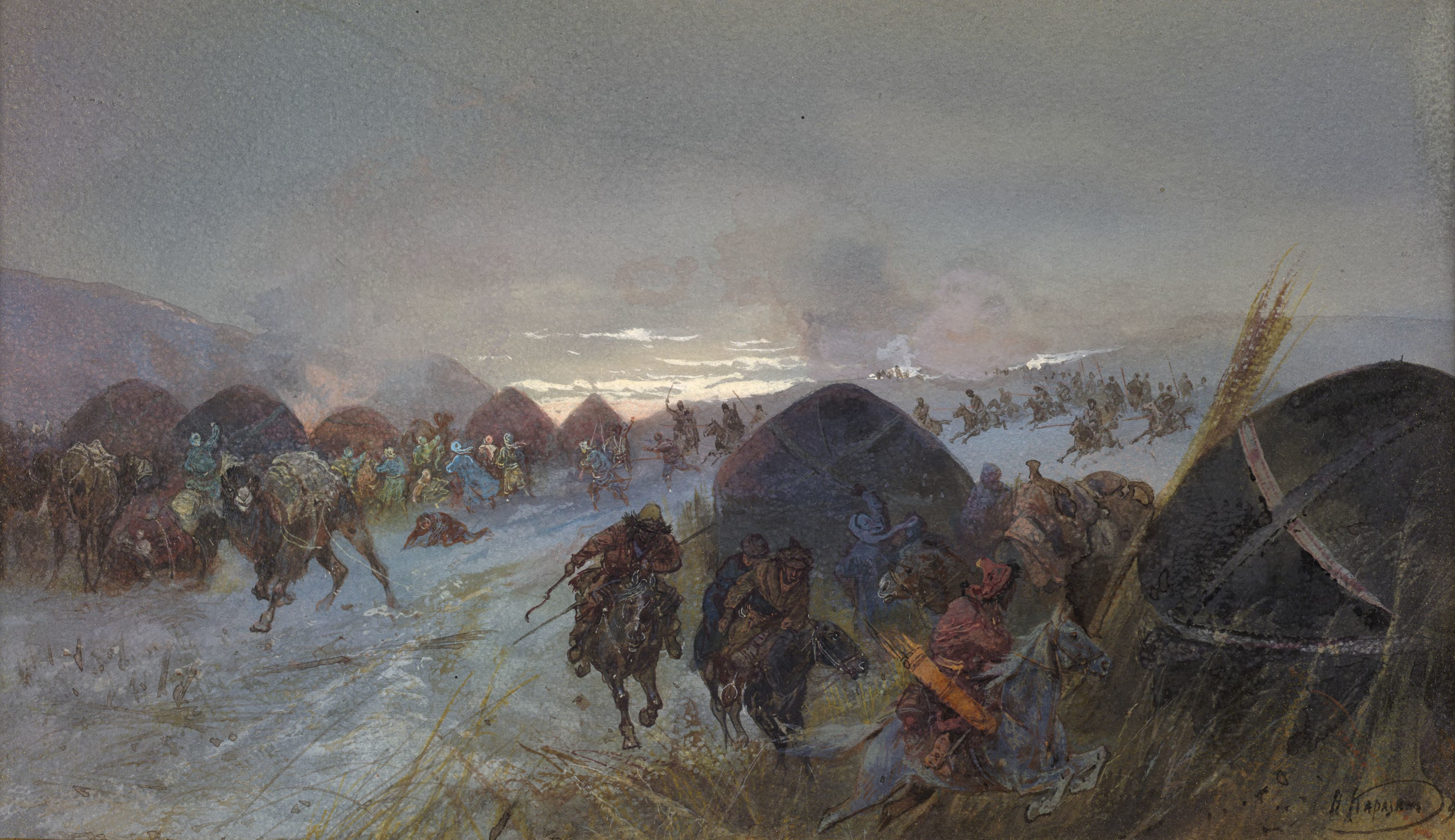
Raid of Cossacks on a native settlement

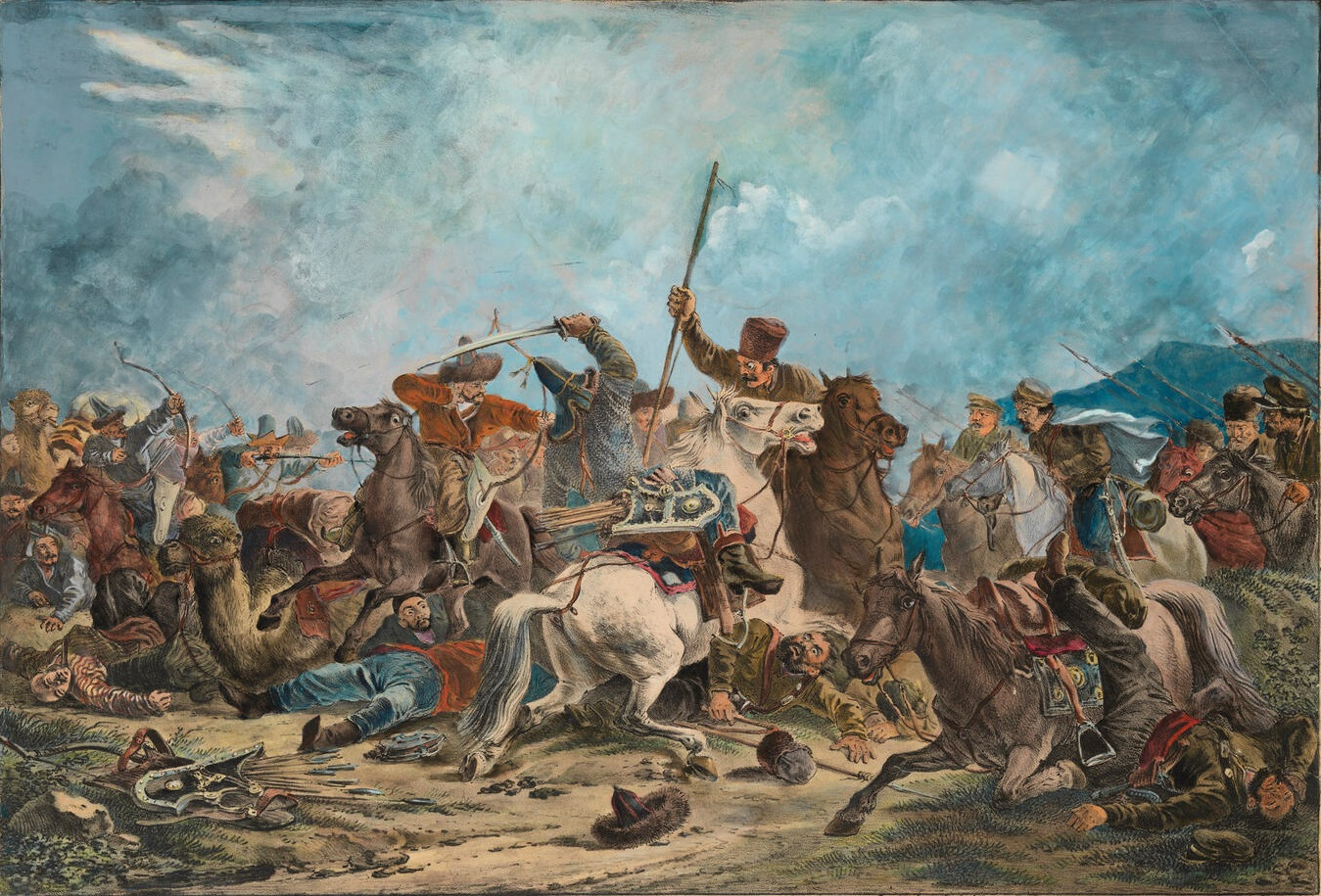
Battle Cossacks with Kazakhs (1826)

By the turn of the 18th century, the Chinggisid states entered a period of sharp decline. In 1736, the capital of the Crimean Khanate was for the first time plundered and burned by Russian troops. A few years later, in 1740, the Uzbek states in Transoxiana and Khwarazm/Khiva were subordinated by the Turkmen conqueror Nader Shah, who overthrew the Safavid dynasty and brought the Mughals under his control. Earlier, in the late 17th century, the Mongols of the Northern Yuan, unable to resist the Dzungars, submitted to the Manchus.

The Russian Empire started to integrate the Kazakh steppe. Between 1822 and 1848, the three main Kazakh Khans of the Lesser, Middle and Great Horde were suspended. Russians built many forts to control the conquered territories. Moreover, Russian settlers were provided with land, whereas nomadic tribes had less area available to drive their herds and flocks. Many of the nomadic tribes were forced to adopt poor and sedentary lifestyles. Because of the Russian Empire policy, between 5 and 15 per cent of the population of Kazakh Steppe were immigrants.

Nineteenth-century colonization of Kazakhstan by Russia was slowed by rebellions and wars, such as uprisings led by Isatay Taymanuly and Makhambet Utemisuly from 1836 to 1838 and the war led by Eset Kotibaruli from 1847 to 1858. In 1863, the Russian Empire announced a new policy asserting the right to annex troublesome areas on its borders. This led immediately to the conquest of the remainder of Central Asia and the creation of two administrative districts: the General-Gubernatorstvo (Governor-Generalships) of Russian Turkestan and the Steppes. Most of present-day Kazakhstan, including Almaty (Verny), was in the latter district.

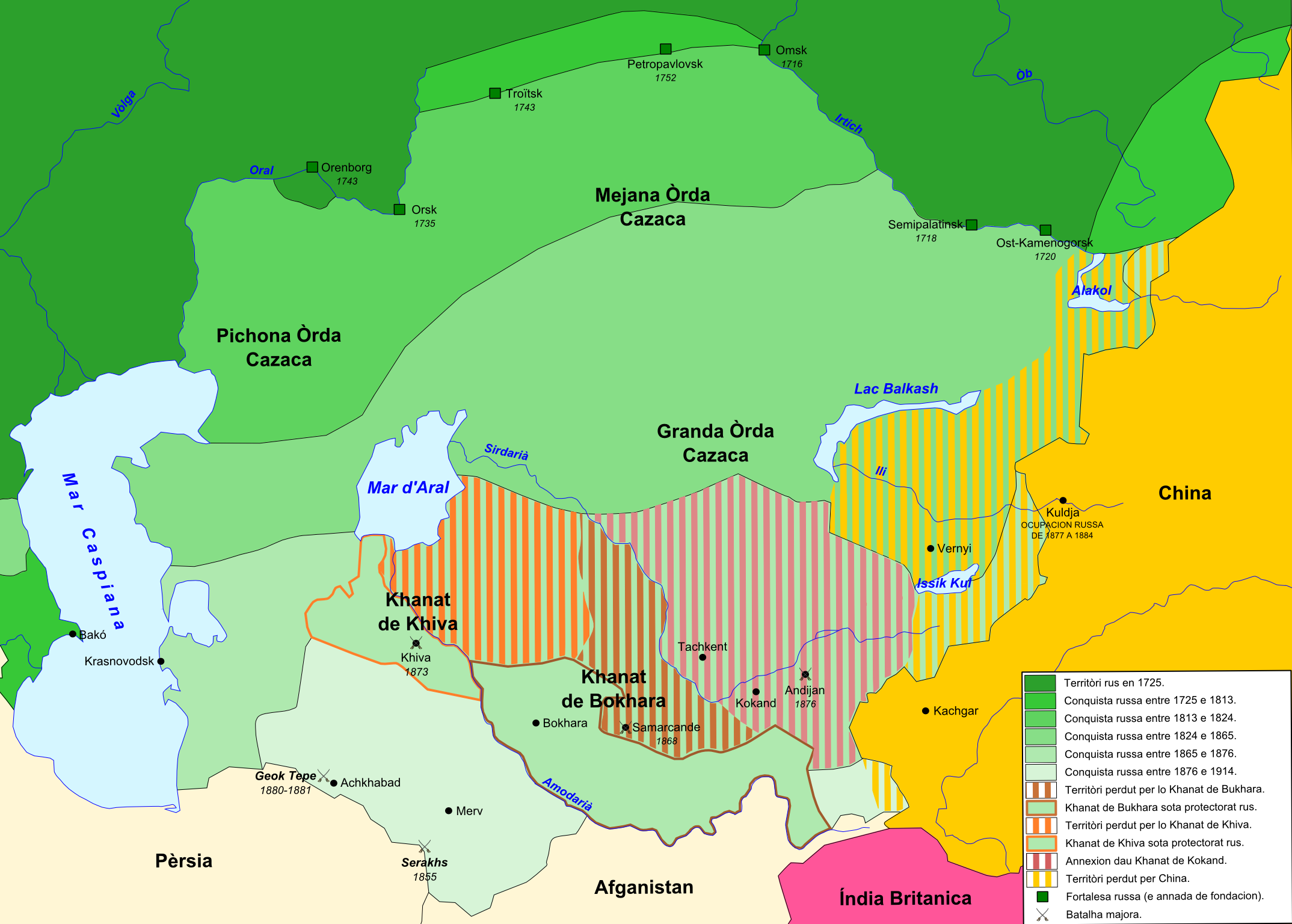
Russian conquest of Central Asia

During the nineteenth century, Kazakhs had remarkable numeracy level, which increased from approximately 72% in 1820 to approximately 88% in 1880. In the first part of the century, Kazakhs were even more numerate than Russians were. However, in that century, Russia conquered many countries and experienced a human capital revolution, which led to a higher numeracy afterwards. Nevertheless, the numeracy of Kazakhs was still higher than other Central Asian nations, which are nowadays referred to as Kyrgyzstan, Turkmenistan and Uzbekistan. There could be several reasons for this striking early numeracy level. First and foremost, the settler share could explain part of this, albeit Russians were a minority in the Kazakh steppe. Secondly, the relatively good nutritional situation in Kazakhstan. Protein malnutrition that plagued many other populations of Central Asian nations was absent in Kazakhstan. Moreover, Russian settlers of the 1870s and 1880s might have simulated so-called contact learning. Kazakhs started to invest more in human capital because they observed that Russians were successful in that area.

During the early 19th century, the Russian forts began to limit the area over which the nomadic tribes could drive their herds and flocks. The final disruption of nomadism began in the 1890s, when many Russian settlers were introduced into the fertile lands of northern and eastern Kazakhstan.

In 1906 the Trans-Aral Railway between Orenburg and Tashkent was completed, facilitating Russian colonisation of the fertile lands of Zhetysu. Between 1906 and 1912, more than a half-million Russian farms were established as part of reforms by Russian Minister of the Interior Petr Stolypin; the farms pressured the traditional Kazakh way of life, occupying grazing land and using scarce water resources. The administrator for Turkestan (current Kazakhstan), Vasile Balabanov, was responsible for Russian resettlement at this time.

Starving and displaced, many Kazakhs joined in the Basmachi movement against conscription into the Russian imperial army ordered by the tsar in July 1916 as part of the war effort against Germany in World War I. In late 1916, Russian forces suppressed the widespread armed resistance to the taking of land and conscription of Central Asians. Thousands of Kazakhs were killed, and thousands more fled to China and Mongolia. Many Kazakhs and Russians fought the Communist takeover, and resisted its control until 1920.

== Alash and Turkestan Autonomy ==
Flag of Alash-Orda

Flag of Turkestan Autonomy

=== Alash orda 1917–1920 ===
In second half of the 20th century Russia started building schools in Kazakhstan. It led to the formation of elite in Kazakh society. Most educated Kazakhs were members of Constitutional Democratic Party, but after it fractioned, Kazakh elite formed new party named after a legendary founder of the Kazakh people—Alash. The party's goal was to found an independent democratic Kazakh state. The party managed to form same-named Orda, which lasted until 1920, when Bolsheviks banned the party.

The territory of Alash orda covered most of modern territories of Kazakhstan excluding southern regions.

=== Turkestan orda ===
The Turkestan orda or Kokand Autonomy, was an unrecognized state in Central Asia that existed at the beginning of the Russian Civil War. It was formed on 27 November 1917 (Note: 28 November in Kazakh-language sources.) and existed until 22 February 1918. It was a secular republic, headed by a president.

== Soviet Union (1920–1991) ==
The Kirghiz Autonomous Socialist Soviet Republic, established in 1920, was renamed the Kazakh Autonomous Socialist Soviet Republic in 1925 when the Kazakhs were officially distinguished from the Kyrgyz by the Soviet government. Although the Russian Empire recognized the ethnic difference between the groups, it called them both "Kirghiz" to avoid confusion between the terms "Kazakhs" and Cossacks (both names originating from the Turkic "free man").

In 1925 the republic's original capital, Orenburg, was reincorporated into Russian territory and Kyzylorda became the capital until 1929. Almaty (known as Alma-Ata during the Soviet period), a provincial city in the far southeast, became the new capital in 1929. In 1936, the territory was officially separated from the Russian Soviet Federative Socialist Republic (RSFSR) and made a Soviet republic: the Kazakh Soviet Socialist Republic. With an area of 2,717,300 km^{2} (1,049,200 sq mi), the Kazakh SSR was the second-largest republic in the Soviet Union.

=== Two famines ===
First Kazakh famine started in 1919 during the Russian Civil War. Amount of livestock in Kazakhstan decreased from 30 million to 16 million, which left almost million people starving due to the civil war. Apart from a famine, Kazakhstan suffered from stopping of all factories.

From 1929 to 1934, when Joseph Stalin was trying to collectivize agriculture, Kazakhstan endured repeated famine called Asharshylyk similar to the Holodomor in Ukraine; in both republics and the Russian SFSR, peasants slaughtered their livestock in protest against Soviet agricultural policy. During that period, over one million residents and 80 percent of the republic's livestock died. Thousands more tried to escape to China, although most starved in the attempt. According to Robert Conquest, "The application of party theory to the Kazakhs, and to a lesser extent to the other nomad peoples, amounted economically to the imposition by force of an untried stereotype on a functioning social order, with disastrous results. And in human terms it meant death and suffering proportionally even greater than in the Ukraine".

=== Repressions ===
During the 1930s, the Soviet government built Gulags across the Union. There were 11 concentration camps built in Kazakhstan, the most well known being ALZhIR.

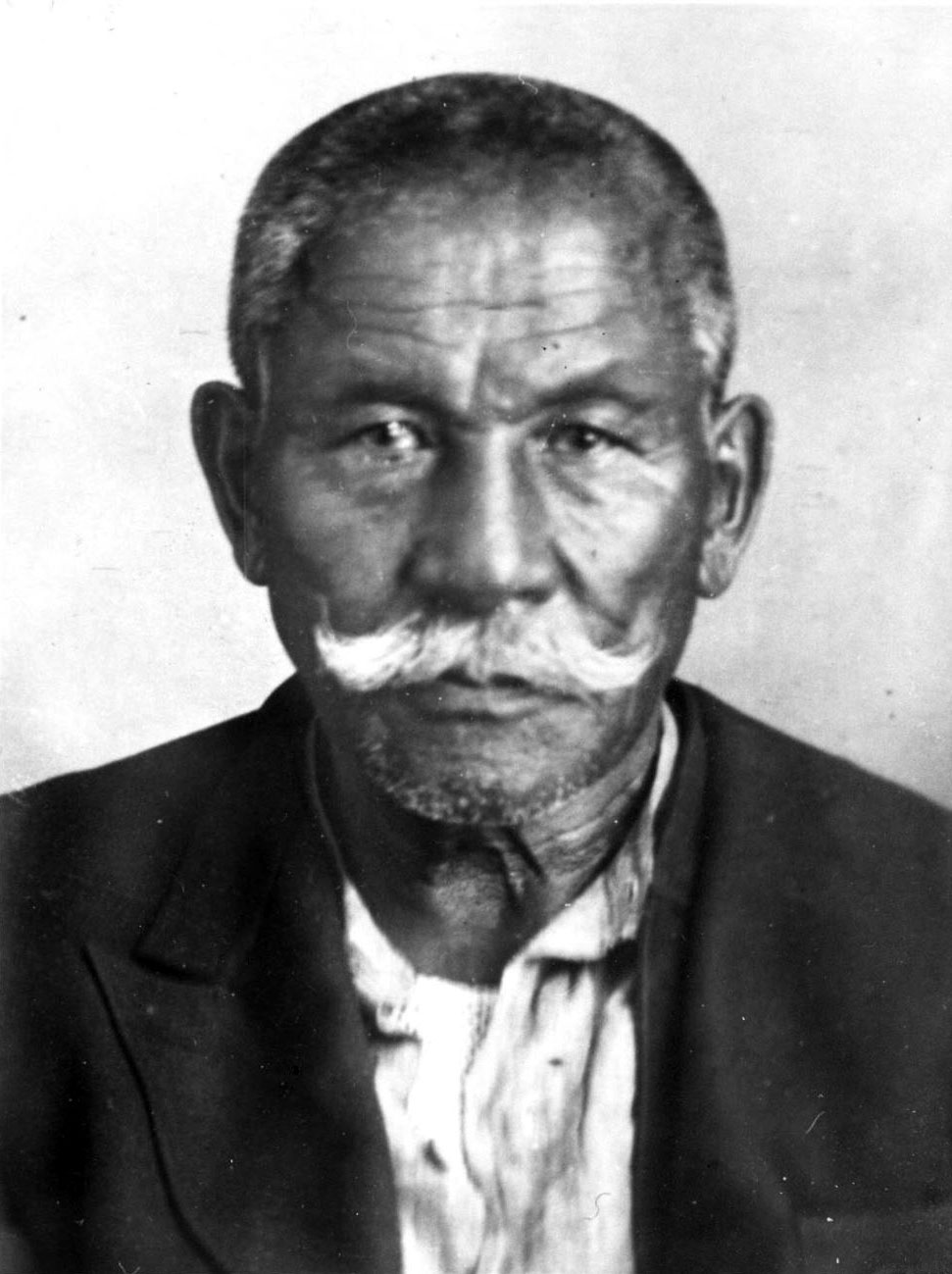
Photograph of Alikhan Bukeikhanov taken in 1937

NKVD Order 00486 of 15 August 1937 marked the beginning of mass repression against ChSIR: members of the families of traitors to the Motherland (Russian: ЧСИР: члены семьи изменника Родины). The order gave the right to arrest without evidence of guilt, and sent women political-prisoners to the camps for the first time. In a few months, female "traitors" were arrested and sentenced to from five to eight years in prison. More than 18,000 women were arrested, and about 8,000 served time in ALZhIR – the Akmolinsk Camp of Wives of Traitors to the Motherland (Russian: Акмолинский лагерь жён изменников Родины (А. Л. Ж. И. Р.)). They included the wives of statesmen, politicians and public figures in the then Soviet Union, including the wives of the former members of the Alash movement. After the closure of the prisons in 1953, it was reported that 1,507 of the women gave birth as a result of being raped by the guards.

During Soviet rule most of former members of Alash started working on translating textbooks for newly building schools, since most Kazakhs still weren't educated in Western ways. Some of former members joined Communist Party, but still elite protested several politics of Soviet government, like collectivization which led to the artificial famine of 1930–33. The Soviet Government attempted to oppress and imprison many of the Kazakh elites. Due to the harsh treatment and conditions in the Kazakh gulags, imprisoned former Alash members experienced accelerated aging over the span of just a few years. This can be observed via photos taken of them before their imprisonment, and gulag mugshots taken before their executions.

=== World War II ===
Through the lens of the front lines and the home front, Roberto Carmack argues that World War II spurred Kazakhstan’s larger integration into the Soviet Union. The Kremlin's propaganda efforts directed at soldiers and civilians, combined with military service and exposure to other parts of the USSR, Sovietized the Kazakh populace and the Kazakh SSR. The war made Kazakhstan more Soviet, but also strengthened its colonial status as a supplier of raw materials and manpower for the war effort, and solidified the hierarchy led by Russia in the USSR.

==== Red Army Participation and Battles Involving Kazakhstan's Soldiers ====
A total of 1.2 million soldiers from Kazakhstan were called up to the Red Army, in addition to 178,000 who were already serving in the Soviet military. Soldiers from Kazakhstan participated in all major Soviet battles of World War II. At the beginning of the war, hundreds of Kazakh soldiers were among the defenders of the Brest Fortress. During the Battle of Moscow, which began in late September 1941, the 316th Rifle Division, commanded by General I.V.Panfilov, and the 312th Rifle Division, led by Colonel A. F. Naumov, distinguished themselves particularly.

The 1073rd Rifle Regiment, under the command of Bauyrzhan Momyshuly, demonstrated heroic resistance against the enemy. Political officers from the Panfilov Division, such as P. B. Vikhrev, M. Gabdullin, and machine gunner T. Tokhtarov, also exhibited extraordinary bravery. Starting from 6 September 1941, Kazakh military units actively participated in the defense of Leningrad. In the summer of 1942, Kazakh forces entered the front-line zone of the Battle of Stalingrad. Kazakhstan's divisions and units fought in the Battle of Kursk and on other fronts, liberating Belarus, the Baltics, Moldova, Ukraine, and countries of Eastern Europe from occupation.

During the Battle of the Dnieper and the liberation of Kyiv, the 47th Separate Guards Tank Brigade, commanded by Galya Adilbekovich Adilbekov, fought heroically. Adilbekov proved himself in key battles such as the Battle of Vitebsk (1941), the counteroffensive near Trubchevsk (1941), and the Battle of Stalingrad (1942). His bravery was acknowledged early in the war, with independent publications about him in Soviet newspapers "Vechernyaya Moskva" (5 September 1941) and "Izvestiya" (13 September 1941). He was the only representative of Central Asian nations to hold the rank of Guard Lieutenant Colonel — commanding a separate Guards Tank Regiment at the time of his death.

==== Awards ====
For their heroism on the fronts of World War II, hundreds of thousands of Kazakh soldiers were awarded Soviet orders and medals, including 96,638 Kazakhs. A total of 497 individuals (including 98 Kazakhs) were awarded the title of Hero of the Soviet Union. Among them were Kazakh women, such as machine gunner M. Mametova and sniper A. Moldagulova. Kazakh pilots T. Y. Begeldinov, L. I. Beda, I. F. Pavlov, and S. D. Lugansky were each twice honored with the title of Hero of the Soviet Union.

=== Internal Soviet migration ===
Many Soviet citizens from the western regions of the USSR and a great deal of Soviet industry relocated to the Kazakh SSR during World War II, when Axis armies captured or threatened to capture western Soviet industrial centres. Groups of Soviet citizens including Crimean Tatars, German, and Muslims from the North Caucasus were deported to the Kazakh SSR during the war. The Kremlin feared that they would collaborate with the Nazi invaders. Many Poles from eastern Poland were also deported to the Kazakh SSR, and local people shared their food with the new arrivals.

Many more non-Kazakhs arrived between 1953 and 1965, during the Virgin Lands Campaign of Soviet Premier Nikita Khrushchev (in office 1958–1964). That program saw huge tracts of Kazakh SSR grazing land cultivated for wheat and other cereal grains. More settlement occurred in the late 1960s and 1970s, when the Soviet government paid bonuses to workers participating in a program to relocate Soviet industry closer to Central Asia's coal, gas, and oil deposits. By the 1970s the Kazakh SSR was the only Soviet republic in which those of eponymous nationality was a minority, due to immigration and the decimation of the nomadic Kazakh population.

The Kazakh SSR played industrial and agricultural roles in the centrally-controlled Soviet economic system, with coal deposits discovered during the 20th century promising to replace depleted fuel-reserves in the European territories of the USSR. The distance between the European industrial centres and the Kazakh coal-fields posed a formidable problem – only partially solved by Soviet efforts to industrialize Central Asia. This left the Republic of Kazakhstan a mixed legacy after 1991: a population of nearly as many Russians as Kazakhs; a class of Russian technocrats necessary to economic progress but ethnically unassimilated, and a coal- and oil-based energy industry whose efficiency is limited by inadequate infrastructure.

== Republic of Kazakhstan (1991–present) ==
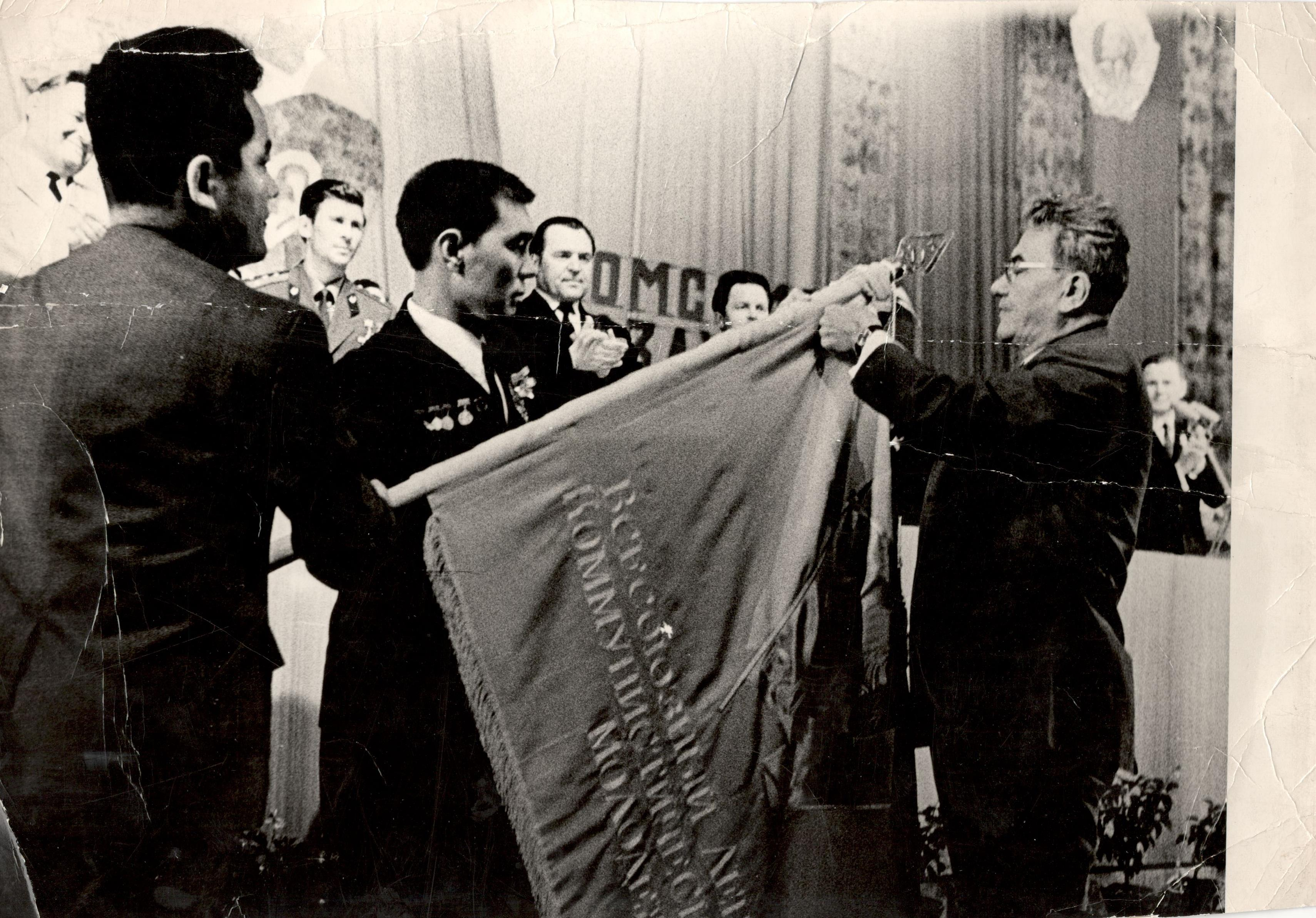
Kunayev awarding a Soviet Army unit's battle flag, 1986.

=== Perestroika and Glasnost ===
On 16 December 1986, the Soviet Politburo dismissed longtime General Secretary of the Communist Party of Kazakhstan Dinmukhamed Konayev. His successor was the non-Kazakh Gennady Kolbin from Ulyanovsk, Russia, which triggered demonstrations protesting the move. The protests were violently suppressed by the authorities, and "between two and twenty people lost their lives, and between 763 and 1137 received injuries. Between 2,212 and 2,336 demonstrators were arrested". When Kolbin prepared to purge the Communist Youth League he was halted by Moscow, and in September 1989 he was replaced with the Kazakh Nursultan Nazarbayev.

=== Priority over Soviet Union laws and negotiations on a new Treaty ===
In June 1990 Moscow declared the sovereignty of the central government over Kazakhstan, forcing Kazakhstan to make its own statement of sovereignty. The exchange exacerbated tensions between the republic's two largest ethnic groups, who at that point were numerically about equal. In mid-August, Kazakh and Russian nationalists began to demonstrate around Kazakhstan's parliament building in an attempt to influence the final statement of sovereignty being drafted; the statement was adopted in October.

=== Nazarbayev Era ===
Like other Soviet republics at that time, Parliament named Nazarbayev its chairman and converted his chairmanship to the presidency of the republic. Unlike the leaders of the other Soviet republics (especially the independence-minded Lithuania, Latvia and Estonia), Nazarbayev remained committed to the Soviet Union during the spring and summer of 1991 largely because he considered parts of USSR too interdependent economically to be able to survive independently. However, he also fought to control Kazakhstan's mineral wealth and industrial potential.

This objective became particularly important after 1990, when it was learned that Mikhail Gorbachev had negotiated an agreement with the American Chevron Corporation to develop Kazakhstan's Tengiz oil field; Gorbachev did not consult Nazarbayev until the talks were nearly completed. At Nazarbayev's insistence, Moscow surrendered control of the republic's mineral resources in June 1991 and Gorbachev's authority crumbled rapidly throughout the year. Nazarbayev continued to support him, urging other republic leaders to sign a treaty creating the Union of Sovereign States which Gorbachev had drafted in a last attempt to hold the Soviet Union together.

=== Soviet coup attempt, the Transition Period and the end of the Soviet Union ===
Because of the August 1991 Soviet coup d'état attempt against Gorbachev, the union treaty was never implemented. Ambivalent about Gorbachev's removal, Nazarbayev did not condemn the coup attempt until its second day. However, he continued to support Gorbachev and some form of union largely because of his conviction that independence would be economic suicide.

At the same time, Nazarbayev began preparing Kazakhstan for greater freedom or outright independence. He appointed professional economists and managers to high positions, and sought advice from foreign development and business experts. The outlawing of the Communist Party of Kazakhstan (CPK) which followed the attempted coup permitted Nazarbayev to take nearly complete control of the republic's economy, more than 90 percent of which had been under the partial (or complete) direction of the Soviet government until late 1991. He solidified his position by winning an uncontested election for president in December 1991.

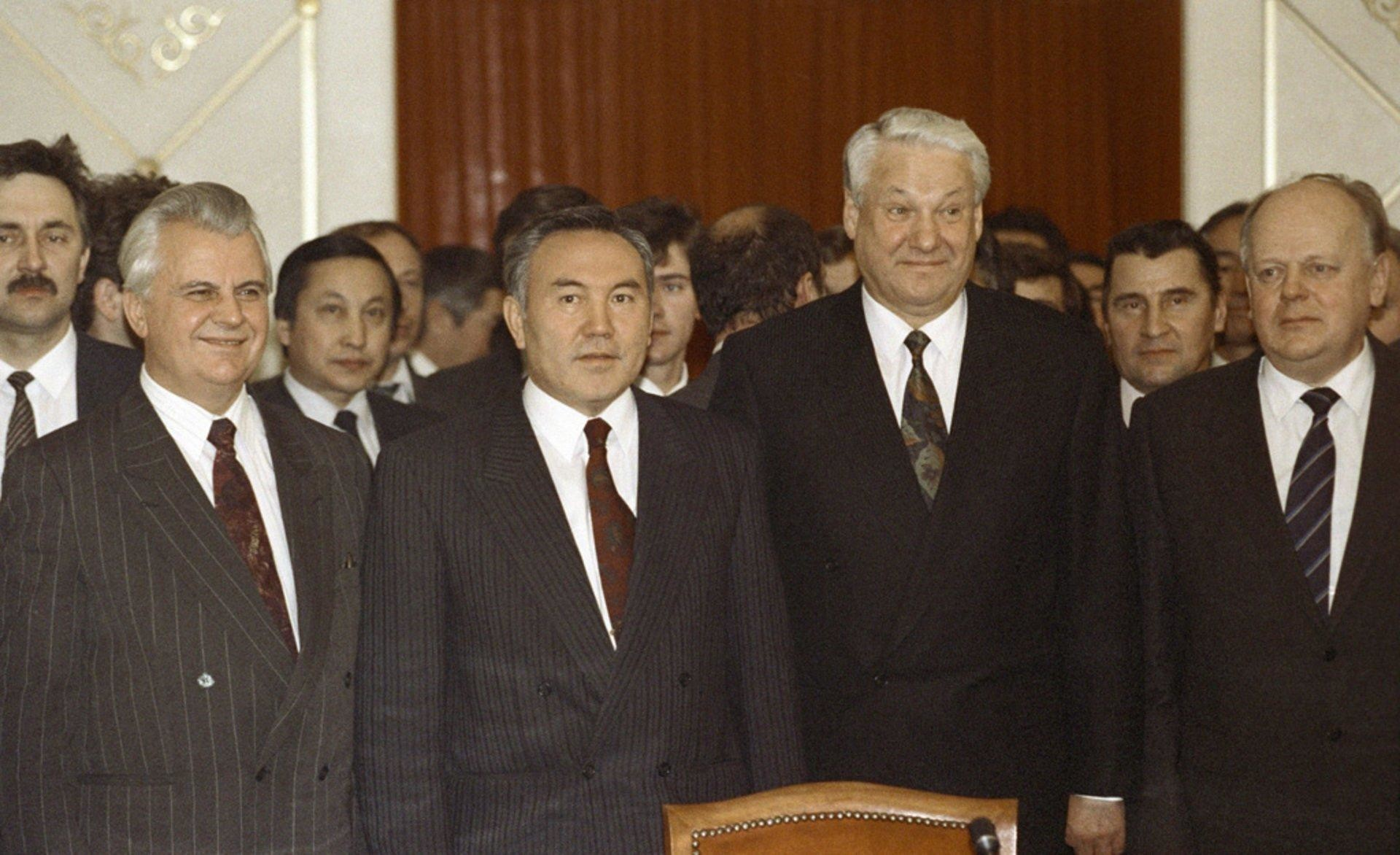
Nazarbayev (second from left) at the signing of the Alma-Ata Protocol, December 1991.

A week after the election, Nazarbayev became the president of an independent state when the leaders of Russia, Ukraine and Belarus signed documents dissolving the Soviet Union. He quickly convened a meeting of the leaders of the five Central Asian states (Kazakhstan, Kyrgyzstan, Tajikistan, Turkmenistan, and Uzbekistan), raising the possibility of a Turkic confederation of former republics as a counterweight to the Slavic states of Russia, Ukraine, and Belarus in whatever federation might succeed the Soviet Union. This move persuaded the three Slavic presidents to include Kazakhstan among the signatories of a recast document of dissolution. Kazakhstan's capital lent its name to the Alma-Ata Protocol, the declaration of principles of the Commonwealth of Independent States.

=== Independent country and the Commonwealth ===
Post-Soviet countries have signed a series of treaties and agreements to settle the legacy of the former Soviet Union multilaterally and bilaterally.

On 16 December 1991, five days before the declaration, Kazakhstan became the last of the republics to proclaim its independence.

The republic has followed the same general political pattern as the other four Central Asian states. After declaring its independence from a political structure dominated by Moscow and the Communist Party of the Soviet Union (CPSU) until 1991, Kazakhstan retained the governmental structure and most of the leadership which had held power in 1990. Nazarbayev, elected president of the republic in 1991, remained in undisputed power five years later.

He took several steps to ensure his position. The constitution of 1993 made the prime minister and the Council of Ministers responsible solely to the president, and a new constitution two years later reinforced that relationship. Opposition parties were limited by legal restrictions on their activities. Within that framework, Nazarbayev gained substantial popularity by limiting the economic shock of separation from the Soviet Union and maintaining ethnic harmony in a diverse country with more than 100 different nationalities.

In December 1994 Nazarbayev signed the Budapest Memorandum along with Russia, the United Kingdom and the United States acting as guarantors and thereby denuclearized the nation. The leaders of Ukraine and Belarus also signed similar documents in a joint ceremonial event in Patria Hall at the Budapest Convention Center.

In 1997 Kazakhstan's capital was moved from Almaty to Astana, and homosexuality was decriminalized the following year.

=== After Nazarbayev ===
In March 2019, President Nursultan Nazarbayev resigned 29 years after taking office. However, he continued to lead the influential security council and held the formal title Leader of the Nation. Kassym-Jomart Tokayev succeeded Nazarbayev as the President of Kazakhstan. His first official act was to rename the capital from Astana to Nur-Sultan after his predecessor. In June 2019, the new president, Kassym-Jomart Tokayev, won Kazakhstan's presidential election.

In January 2022, President Kassym-Jomart Tokayev took over as head of the powerful Security Council, removing Nazarbayev from the post, after violent protests triggered by fuel price. President Kassym-Jomart Tokayev later proposed constitutional amendments aimed at limiting his power and stripping Nazarbayev of his formal title Leader of the Nation. Kazakhs later voted in the 2022 Kazakh constitutional referendum approving of the constitutional amendments. In September 2022, the name of the country's capital was changed back to Astana from Nur-Sultan.

=== Relationship with Russia ===
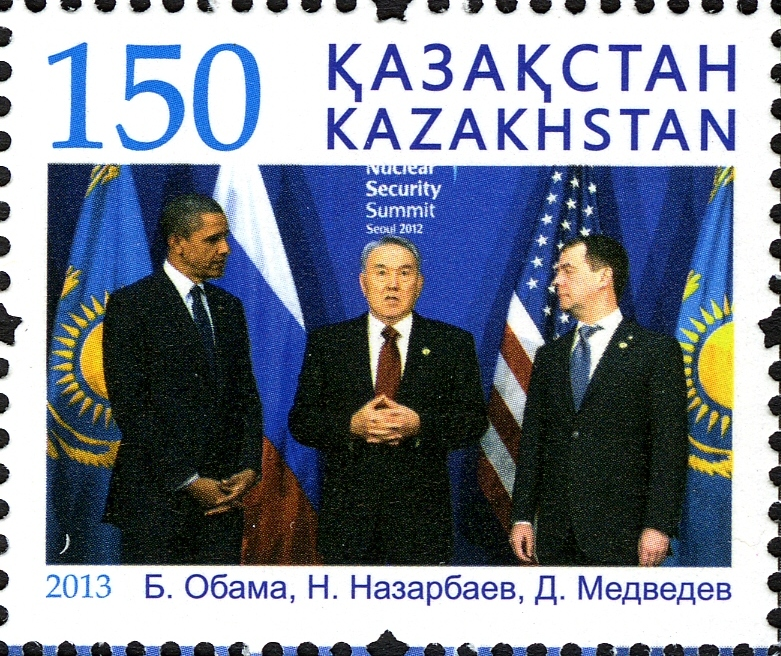
Stamp of Kazakhstan, 2013: Barack Obama, Nursultan Nazarbayev and Dmitry Medvedev

During the mid-1990s, although Russia remained the most important sponsor of Kazakhstan in economic and national security matters Nazarbayev supported the strengthening of the CIS. As sensitive ethnic, national-security and economic issues cooled relations with Russia during the decade, Nazarbayev cultivated relations with China, the other Central Asian nations, and the West; however, Kazakhstan remains principally dependent on Russia. The Baikonur Cosmodrome, built during the 1950s for the Soviet space program, is near Tyuratam and the city of Baikonur was built to accommodate the spaceport.

=== Relationship with the US ===
Kazakhstan also maintains good relations with the United States. The country is the US's 78th-largest trading partner, incurring $2.5 billion in two-way trade, and it was the first country to recognize Kazakhstan after independence. In 1994 and 1995, the US worked with Kazakhstan to remove all nuclear warheads after the latter renounced its nuclear program and closed the Semipalatinsk Test Sites; the last nuclear sites and tunnels were closed by 1995. In 2010, US President Barack Obama met with Nazarbayev at the Nuclear Security Summit in Washington, DC and discussed intensifying their strategic relationship and bilateral cooperation to increase nuclear safety, regional stability, and economic prosperity.

== See also ==
- Bibliography of the Asharshylyk
- Central State Museum of Kazakhstan
- Early medieval states in Kazakhstan
- History of Asia
- History of Central Asia
- History of the Soviet Union
- Indo-Aryan migration theory
- List of Kazakhs
- List of Kazakh khans
- List of leaders of Kazakhstan
- Politics of Kazakhstan
- Turkic migration
