= 2026 in Kazakhstan =

- Decades: 2000s; 2010s; 2020s
- See also: Other events of 2026; Timeline of Kazakhstani history

Events in the year 2026 in Kazakhstan.

== Incumbents ==
Photo	Post	Name
	Chairman of the Security Council of Kazakhstan	Kassym-Jomart Tokayev
	President of Kazakhstan	Kassym-Jomart Tokayev
	Prime Minister of Kazakhstan	Oljas Bektenov

== Events ==
=== February ===
- 5 February – A tenth-grader injures two students with an axe at a school in Kulsary, Atyrau Region.
- 25 February – A Sukhoi Su-30 of the Kazakh Air Defense Forces crashes during a training flight in Karaganda Region. Both pilots safely eject.
- 27 February – Seven people are killed in an explosion at a café in Shchuchinsk, Akmola Region.

=== March ===
- 15 March – 2026 Kazakh constitutional referendum: A motion to pass a new constitution is approved by 87% of voters on a turnout of 73%.

=== April ===
- 16 April – Nineteen activists are convicted and sentenced to up to five years' imprisonment for staging a protest in 2025 against Chinese repression in Xinjiang.

=== May ===
- 16 May – The Astana Light Metro begins operations.
- 28 May – Russia signs a $16.5 billion agreement to build the first nuclear power plant in Kazakhstan.

=== June ===
- 10 June – Two 13-year-old boys fatally stab a 12-year-old in Almaty.

=== July ===
- 1 July – The new Constitution of Kazakhstan comes into effect.
- 24 July – The United States imposes a 12.5% tariff on Kazakhstan, citing the presence of alleged forced labor in the supply chain.
- 26 July – The Rock Mosques and Associated Sacred Sites of Mangystau are designated as UNESCO World Heritage Sites.

=== August ===
- 23 August – 2026 Kazakh legislative election: The ruling Ädilet party wins 71.17% of the vote on a turnout of 73.8%.

=== September ===
- 24 September – Fourteen military personnel are killed in a boating accident during an exercise in the Caspian Sea off Aktau.

== Holidays ==
- 1 January – New Year's Day
- 7 January – Orthodox Christmas
- 8 March – International Women's Day
- 21–23 March – Nowruz
- 1 May – Kazakhstan People's Unity Day
- 7 May – Defender of the Fatherland Day
- 9 May – Great Patriotic War Against Fascism Victory Day
- 6 June – Kurban Ait
- 6 July – Capital City Day
- 30 August – Constitution Day
- 25 October – Republic Day
- 16 December – Independence Day

== Deaths ==
- 8 January – Murat Bisembin, 53, actor.
- 16 January – Ratbek hadji Nysanbayev, 85, cleric.
- 10 February – Yesen Taskynbayev, 93, Soviet politician, deputy of the Supreme Soviet of the Kazakh SSR (1971–1989).
- 19 April – Mukhtar Shakhanov, 83, writer, politician and diplomat.
- 13 June — Almas Ordabajev, 88, architect.
