= 2027 in Kazakhstan =

- Decades: 2000s; 2010s; 2020s
- See also: Other events of 2027; Timeline of Kazakhstani history

Events in the year 2027 in Kazakhstan.

== Events ==
=== Predicted and scheduled ===
- 22–30 May – 2027 World Table Tennis Championships in Astana
- TBA
  - 2027 World Boxing Championships in Astana
  - 2027 World Judo Championships
  - 2027 World Taekwondo Championships

== Holidays ==
- 1 January – New Year's Day
- 7 January – Orthodox Christmas
- 8 March – International Women's Day
- 21–24 March – Nowruz
- 1 May – Kazakhstan People's Unity Day
- 7 May – Defender of the Fatherland Day
- 9 May – Great Patriotic War Against Fascism Victory Day
- 16 May – Kurban Ait
- 6 July – Capital City Day
- 30 August – Constitution Day
- 25 October – Republic Day
- 16 December – Independence Day
