= 2025 in Kazakhstan =

- Decades: 2000s; 2010s; 2020s
- See also: Other events of 2025; Timeline of Kazakhstani history

Events in the year 2025 in Kazakhstan.

== Incumbents ==
Photo	Post	Name
	Chairman of the Security Council of Kazakhstan	Kassym-Jomart Tokayev
	President of Kazakhstan	Kassym-Jomart Tokayev
	Prime Minister of Kazakhstan	Oljas Bektenov

== Events ==
=== January ===
- 3 January – At least 95 vehicles figure in a pileup along the Astana-Shchuchinsk road near Zhanatalap, Akmola Region.
- 23 January – Nineteen vehicles figure in a pileup along the Yekaterinburg-Almaty highway near Aksu-Ayuly, Karaganda Region, injuring six people.

=== May ===
- 28 May – The government allows the hunting of the previously endangered saiga antelope, citing damage to crops and rapid population growth.

=== June ===
- 14 June – The Aviation Administration bans all flights over Iran, Israel, Syria, Iraq, Jordan, and Lebanon due to Middle East tensions and war.
- 20 June – The Senate passes an amnesty bill set to release 4,100 individuals from criminal liability and ease sentences for 11,000 more.
- 25 June – Air Astana resumes flights from Kazakhstan to the Middle East after 11 days following a regional ceasefire, with flights bypassing Iranian airspace.

=== July ===
- 1 July –
  - President Kassym-Jomart Tokayev dissolves Kazakhstan’s Anti-Corruption Agency, and transfers its functions to the National Security Committee.
  - Azerbaijan, Kazakhstan, and Uzbekistan sign an agreement to establish the Green Corridor Union, a joint venture to promote regional green energy cooperation.
- 10 July – An anthrax outbreak is confirmed in Akmola Region, with seven human cases linked to unregistered livestock.
- 14 July – Kazatomprom signs a deal to supply uranium to Slovakia’s SEAS for nuclear power generation.
- 23 July – A 450-meter fuel smuggling tunnel is uncovered on the Kazakhstan–Uzbekistan border in the Turkistan Region; five Kazakh nationals are named as suspects.
- 25 July – A Eurocopter EC145 of the Kazakh Air Defense Forces crashes into Lake Sorbulak, Almaty Region, killing all three occupants on board.
- 29 July –
  - Kazakhstan and Turkey sign a joint declaration and 18 agreements to deepen strategic cooperation across multiple sectors.
  - Prime Minister Oljas Bektenov launches the Innovative Project Navigator to track job creation, and sets a goal to employ 3.3 million people by 2030.

=== August ===
- 26 August – Kairat FC defeat Celtic FC in a penalty shootout (3–2) at Almaty Central Stadium after two goalless legs, qualifying for the UEFA Champions League group stage for the first time.

=== September ===
- 14 September – Kazakhstan wins ten medals (7 gold, 1 silver, 2 bronze) at the 2025 World Boxing Championships in Liverpool, topping the overall medal table.

=== October ===
- 9 October – Russian president Vladimir Putin admits that Russian air defenses were responsible for the shooting down of Azerbaijan Airlines Flight 8243 and its subsequent crash in Kazakhstan in 2024.

=== November ===
- 13 November – Eighteen people are arrested for burning a Chinese flag and a portrait of Chinese leader Xi Jinping during a protest in Almaty Region against the detention of Kazakh nationals by China.
- 27 November – The launchpad of Baikonur Cosmodrome sustains significant damage following the launch of the Soyuz MS-28 rocket carrying three astronauts to the International Space Station.

=== December ===
- December 30: Kazakhstan President Kassym-Jomart Tokayev signs into law Kazakh anti-LGBTQ law. The law is similar to the one adopted in Russia.

== Holidays ==
- 1 January – New Year's Day
- 7 January – Orthodox Christmas
- 8 March – International Women's Day
- 21–23 March – Nowruz
- 1 May – Kazakhstan People's Unity Day
- 7 May – Defender of the Fatherland Day
- 9 May – Great Patriotic War Against Fascism Victory Day
- 6 June – Kurban Ait
- 6 July – Capital City Day
- 30 August – Constitution Day
- 25 October – Republic Day
- 16 December – Independence Day
