= 2024 in Kazakhstan =

- Decades: 2000s; 2010s; 2020s
- See also: Other events of 2024; Timeline of Kazakhstani history

Events in the year 2024 in Kazakhstan.

== Incumbents ==
Photo	Post	Name
	Chairman of the Security Council of Kazakhstan	Kassym-Jomart Tokayev
	President of Kazakhstan	Kassym-Jomart Tokayev
	Prime Minister of Kazakhstan	Älihan Smaiylov (until 5 February)
	Prime Minister of Kazakhstan	Roman Sklyar (until 6 February)
	Prime Minister of Kazakhstan	Oljas Bektenov (since 6 February)

== Events ==
- 5 April – More than 100,000 are displaced following floods caused by the spring thaw in northern and western parts of the country.
- 14 May – The Supreme Court of Kazakhstan sentences former Minister of National Economy Kuandyk Bishimbayev to 24 years in prison for torturing and murdering his wife.
- 2 July – Exiled opposition activist Aydos Sadykov dies of injuries sustained after being shot in Kyiv, Ukraine on 18 June.
- 6 October – A majority of voters in a nationwide referendum allow the construction of Kazakhstan's first nuclear power plant in Ülken, near Lake Balkhash.
- 25 December – Azerbaijan Airlines Flight 8243, an Embraer ERJ-190AR carrying 67 people, crashes in Aktau, killing 38 people on board. Azerbaijan subsequently accuses Russia of unintentionally shooting down the aircraft.

== Holidays ==
- 1 January – New Year's Day
- 7 January – Eastern Orthodoxy Christmas
- 8 March – International Women's Day
- 21–23 March – Nowruz
- 1 May – Kazakhstan People's Unity Day
- 7 May – Defender of the Fatherland Day
- 9 May – Great Patriotic War Against Fascism Victory Day
- 16 June – Qurban Ayt
- 6 July – Capital City Day
- 30 August – Constitution Day
- 25 October – Republic Day
- 16 December – Independence Day
