= Jetisu Park =

Urban park in Astana, Kazakhstan

- Жетісу саябағы
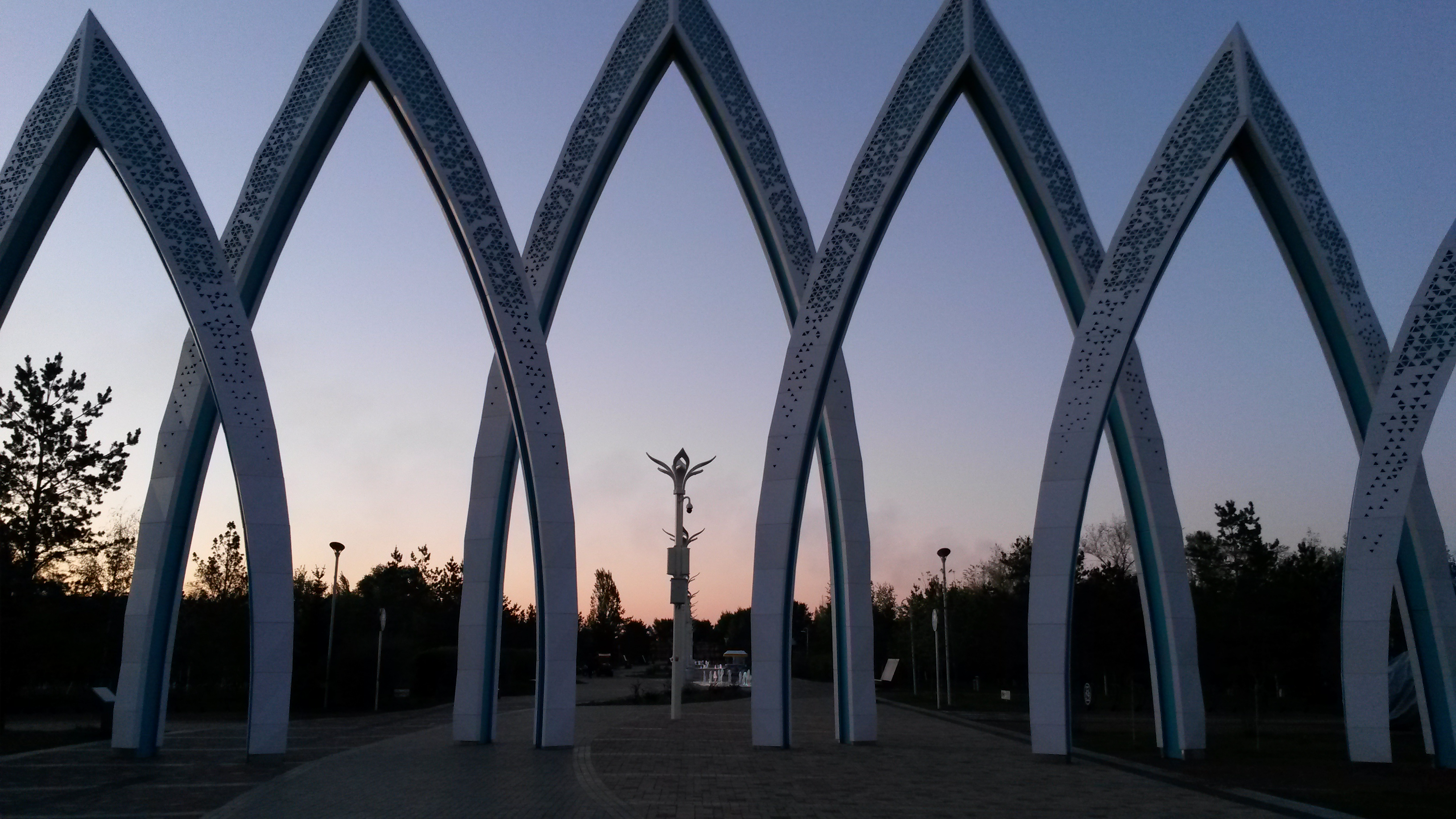
- Entrance gates to the park
- Interactive map of Jetisu Park
- Location: Astana, Kazakhstan
- Coordinates: 51°08′09″N 71°26′19″E
- Area: 15 hectares (37 acres)
- Created: 2007
- Designer: Bi Group

The Jetisu Park (Kazakh: Жетісу саябағы, romanized: Jetısu saiabağy) is an urban park in the city of Astana. The name derives from the Zhetysu, an area in Almaty Region which the park is based on the historical and cultural landscape of the region. The park features fountains, bike lanes, and children's playground.

== History ==
The recreational area was originally created in 2007 as Arai Park. It featured full-sized sculptures of known politicians, khans, military leaders, scientists, poets and 18 bronze monuments of ancient warriors. In April 2018, the park went under reconstruction which was carried out by Bi Group and was funded by the Akimat of Almaty Region. On 1 July 2018, at the 20th anniversary Capital City Day, the Jetisu Park was opened with the opening ceremony being attended by President Nursultan Nazarbayev.
