= Lovers' Park (Astana) =

Urban park in Kazakhstan

- Youth Park
- Ғашықтар саябағы
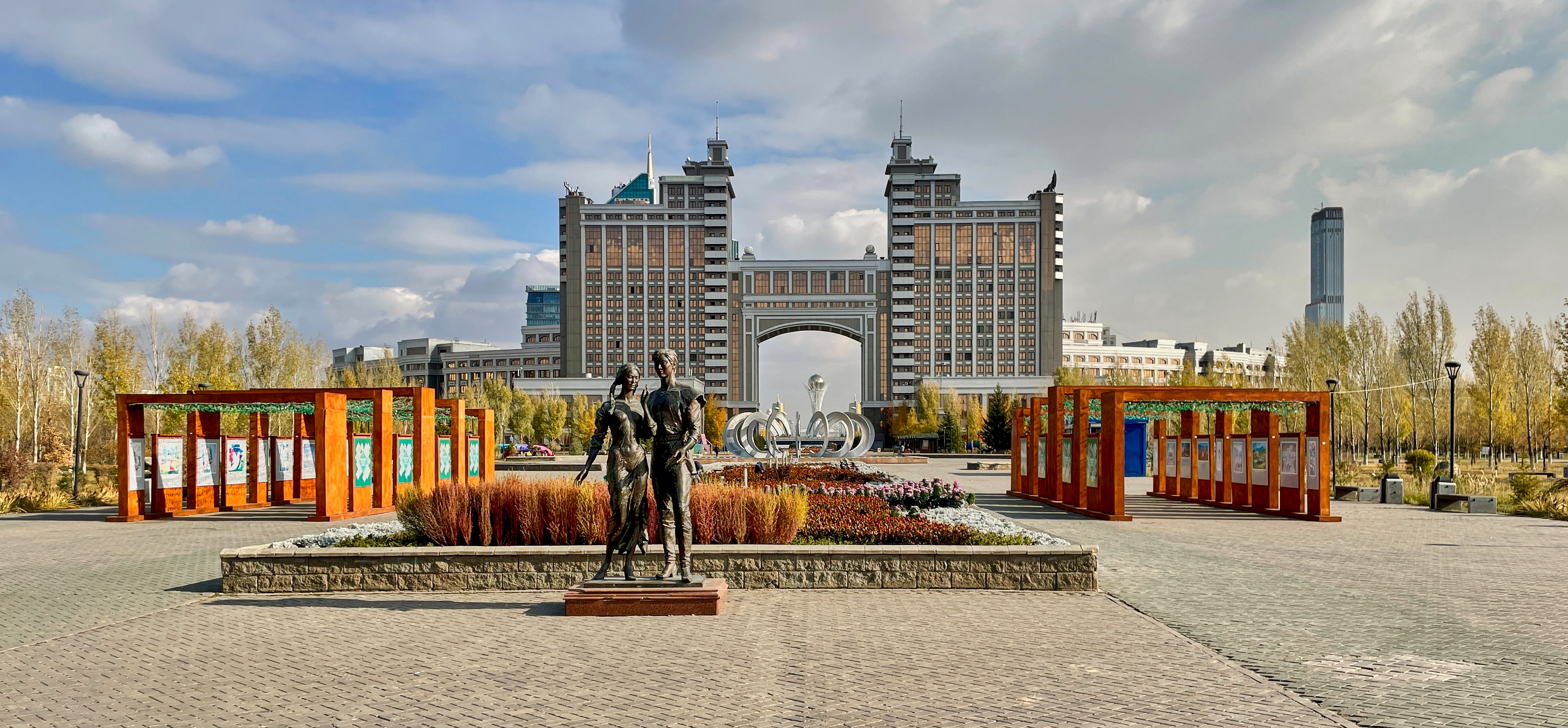
- Interactive map of Lovers' Park
- Type: Urban park
- Location: Astana, Kazakhstan
- Coordinates: 51°07′54″N 71°24′34″E
- Area: 35 acres (14 ha)
- Opened: 6 July 2005; 21 years ago

Lovers' Park (Kazakh: Ғашықтар саябағы, romanized: Ğaşyqtar saiabağy; Russian: Парк влюбленных), also known as Youth Park (Kazakh: Жастар саябағы, romanized: Jastar saiabağy; Russian: Парк молодежи) is an urban park in Astana, Kazakhstan. It was opened on 6 July 2005 on the Capital City Day celebration. The park is located right behind the KazMunayGas headquarters and is situated right between Döñgelek Square and in the front of Khan Shatyr.

== Description ==
The park covers around 35 acres. More than three thousand young lindens, spruces, pines, birches and poplars, as well as maples and elms, atypical for this area, were planted. President Nursultan Nazarbayev himself planted a tree as well. All lawns and flower beds are planned and planted strictly according to German technology, because it is in Germany that landscape construction has deep roots and long traditions. In the center of the park there is a large fountain, which was given by Austrian princess Gabriela von Habsburg as a gift in 2007. Created on the basis of metal structure.
