= Germany–Kazakhstan relations =

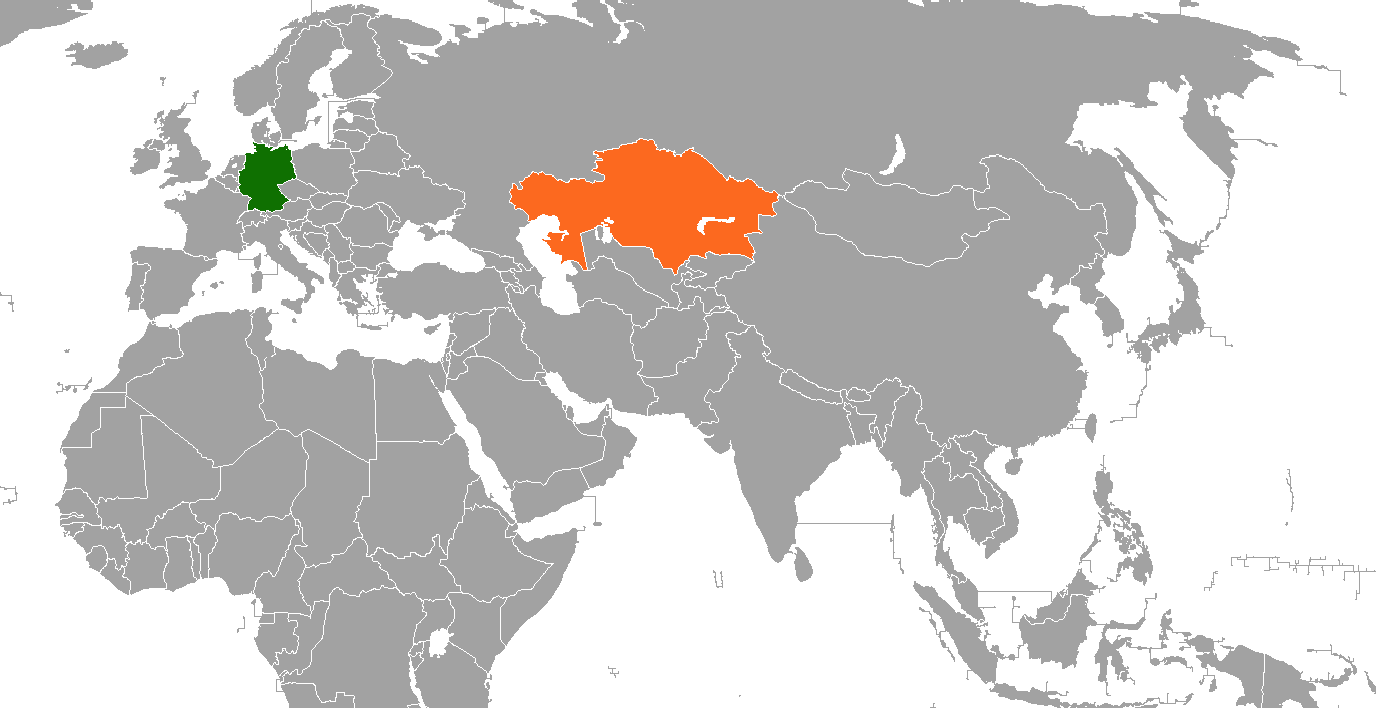

- Germany: Kazakhstan

Diplomatic mission
- Embassy of Germany, Astana: Embassy of Kazakhstan, Berlin

Diplomatic relations between the Germany and Kazakhstan were established in 1991 after Kazakhstan gained independence from the former Soviet Union. Ethnic Germans and ethnic Kazakhs have a shared history dating back to World War II when ethnic Germans living in the Volga region of Russia were relocated or imprisoned in the eastern steppe of the Soviet Union in what is today the territory of Kazakhstan. At the collapse of the former Soviet Union, about one million ethnic Germans lived in Kazakhstan.

== Cultural relations ==
Germany and Kazakhstan have a robust framework in place for promoting and maintaining cultural exchange and people to people ties.

== Economic relations ==
Over 1450 companies with German capital, including joint ventures, representations of German companies and banks, are registered in Kazakhstan. Over 900 German enterprises actively operate in Kazakhstan, including Heidelberg Cement, Daimler, Volkswagen, MAN, Siemens, Knauf, RWE, Bayer, BASF, Bosch, METRO, etc.

Germany was one of the first countries to extend export credits under a bilateral arrangement to Kazakhstan in 1992 to support German manufacturers and modernize Kazakhstan's market economy. Bilateral trade between the two countries amounted to EUR 4 billion in 2016. The trade turnover between Kazakhstan and Germany, which experienced a decline in 2014-2016 due to the economic crisis, almost reached its pre-crisis level in 2017. The total trade between Kazakhstan and Germany in 2017 amounted to 4 billion 856 million euros, which is 81.3% of Germany's trade turnover with the Central Asian countries.

A large part of foreign investments in Kazakhstan originates from Germany. Foreign direct investments (FDI) to Kazakhstan from Germany exceeded $183 million in 2018. The FDI were directed mainly into trade, industry and renewable energy.

== Climate Diplomacy ==
The Green Central Asia Initiative is an initiative of Germany to align and advance policies on climate and security in Kazakhstan and other regional nations.

== State Visits ==
Since the establishment of diplomatic relations, the President of Kazakhstan, Nursultan Nazarbayev, paid seven high-level visits to Germany, in 1992, 1997, 2001, 2004, 2007, 2009, and 2012. High-ranking German officials also made official visits to Kazakhstan. In 1995, the country was visited by the President of the Federal Republic of Germany, Roman Herzog; in 2003, by Federal Chancellor Gerhard Schröder; and in 2008, by Federal President Horst Köhler. Federal Chancellor Angela Merkel visited Kazakhstan twice in 2010: in July on an official visit and in December to participate in the OSCE Summit, held in Astana under Kazakhstan’s chairmanship. On 11 July 2017, Kazakhstan received an official visit from the Federal President of Germany, Frank-Walter Steinmeier.

In October 2001, Nursultan Nazarbayev paid an official visit to Germany. During the visit, he held meetings with Federal Chancellor Gerhard Schröder, Federal President Johannes Rau, Federal Minister for Foreign Affairs Joschka Fischer, and Aga Khan IV, as well as with representatives of the business community and the media.

In December 2003, Federal Chancellor Gerhard Schröder paid an official visit to Kazakhstan. He held talks with Nursultan Nazarbayev, participated in the Kazakhstan–German Business Forum, and oversaw the signing of several bilateral documents, including a Joint Statement on the professional training of managers in Kazakhstan’s economic sector and a Joint Statement on the establishment of the Kazakhstan–German University in Almaty.

In April 2004, Nursultan Nazarbayev made a working visit to Germany. During the visit, he met with Federal Chancellor Gerhard Schröder, Chairman of the German–Kazakh Society and Bundestag member Gernot Erler, and Minister-President of the federal state of Lower Saxony Christian Wulff. Nazarbayev also joined Schröder at the opening ceremony of the Hannover Trade Fair, as well as the inauguration of Kazakhstan’s national exhibition.

German chancellor Angela Merkel visited Kazakhstan in 2010 where she met with President Nursultan Nazarbayev to commence a 'more dynamic partnership' with Kazakhstan. Merkel laid a wreath at the Otan Qorgaushylar Monument, an Astana monument to the fallen soldiers of the Great Patriotic War (the Eastern Front of World War II).

German president Frank-Walter Steinmeier noted in a July 2017 visit to Astana that German-Kazakh relations had grown closer and broader over the past 25 years. The German president conducted his visit to participate in the National Day of Germany at the EXPO-2017. During his visit, the German president met with his Kazakh counterpart Nursultan Nazarbayev to discuss the countries' cooperation in economy, technology and education.

== Resident diplomatic missions ==
- Germany has an embassy in Astana and a consulate-general in Almaty.
- Kazakhstan has an embassy in Berlin, an embassy branch office in Bonn and consulates-general in Frankfurt, Hannover and Munich.

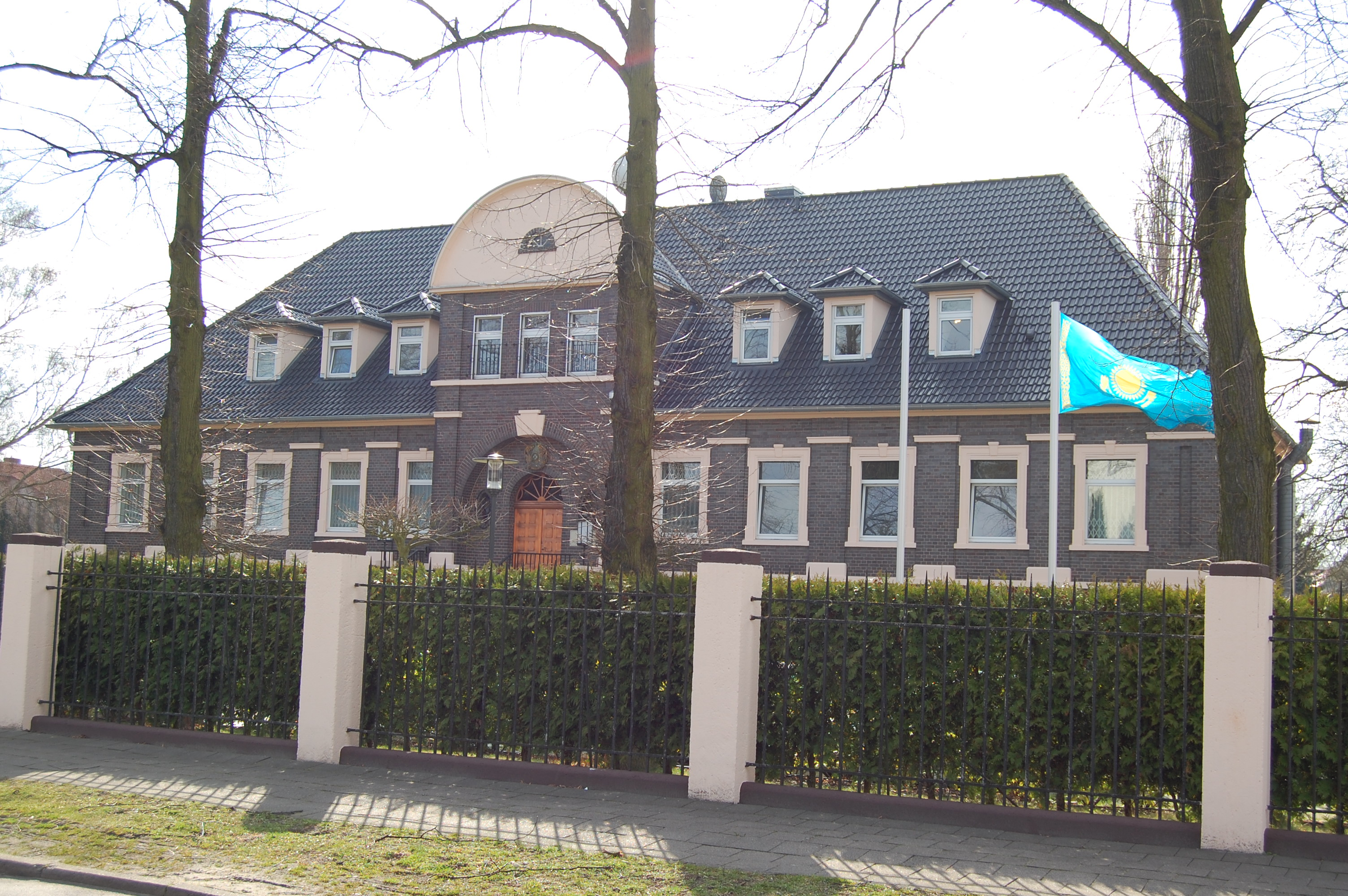
Embassy of Kazakhstan in Berlin

== See also ==
- Foreign relations of Germany
- Foreign relations of Kazakhstan
- Germans of Kazakhstan
