= Public holidays in Kazakhstan =

This is a list of public holidays in Kazakhstan:

== Public holidays ==
Date	English name	Kazakh name	Russian name	Notes
1-2 January	New Year's Day	Жаңа жыл; Jaña jyl	Новый год; Novyy god	
7 January	Orthodox Christmas	Мәсіх туылуы; Mäsıh tuyluy	Рождество Христово; Rozhdestvo Khristovo	An official holiday since 2007
8 March	International Women's Day	Халықаралық әйелдер күні; Halyqaralyq äielder künı	Международный женский день; Mezhdunarodnyy zhenskiy den	
15 March	Constitution Day	Конституция күні; Konstitutsiia künı	День Конституции; Den' Konstitutsii	
21-23 March	Nowruz	Наурыз мейрамы; Nauryz meiramy	Наурыз; Nauryz	Originally the Persian New Year, is traditionally a springtime holiday marking the beginning of a new year.
1 May	Kazakhstan People's Unity Day	Қазақстан халқының бірлігі мерекесі; Qazaqstan halqynyñ bırlıgı merekesı	День единства народа Казахстана; Den' yedinstva naroda Kazakhstana	
7 May	Defender of the Fatherland Day	Отан Қорғаушы күні; Otan Qorğauşy künı	День Защитника Отечества; Den' Zashchitnika Otechestva	An official holiday since 2013
9 May	Victory Day	Жеңіс күні; Jeñıs künı	День Победы; Den' Pobedy	Marks the victory against Nazi Germany in World War II
6 July	Capital City Day	Астана күні; Astana künı	День столицы; Den' stolitsy	On 6 July 1994, the Supreme Council of Kazakhstan adopted a resolution to transfer the capital of Kazakhstan from Almaty to Akmola
Last day of Hajj	Kurban Ait^{a}	Құрбан айт; Qūrban ait	Курбан айт; Kurban ait	An official holiday since 2007
25 October	Republic Day	Республика күні; Respublika künı	День Республики; Den' Respubliki	An official holiday from 1995-2009, and again since 2022
16 December	Independence Day	Тәуелсіздік күні; Täuelsızdık künı	День Независимости; Den' Nezavisimosti	Independence from the Soviet Union

^{a} Eid al-Adha, the Islamic "Feast of Sacrifice".

== Other holidays ==
- National Guard Day – 10 January
- Day of the State Security Service of Kazakhstan – 21 April
- Police Day – 23 June
- Border Guards Day – 18 August
- Day of Remembrance of the Victims of Political Repressions – 31 May
