= Karipbek Kuyukov =

Kazakh painter

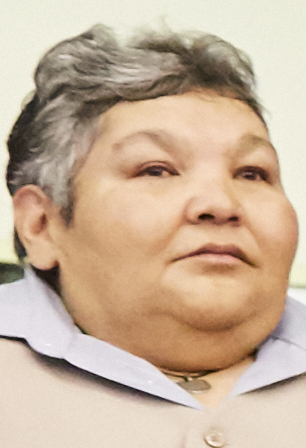
Kuyukov in 2016

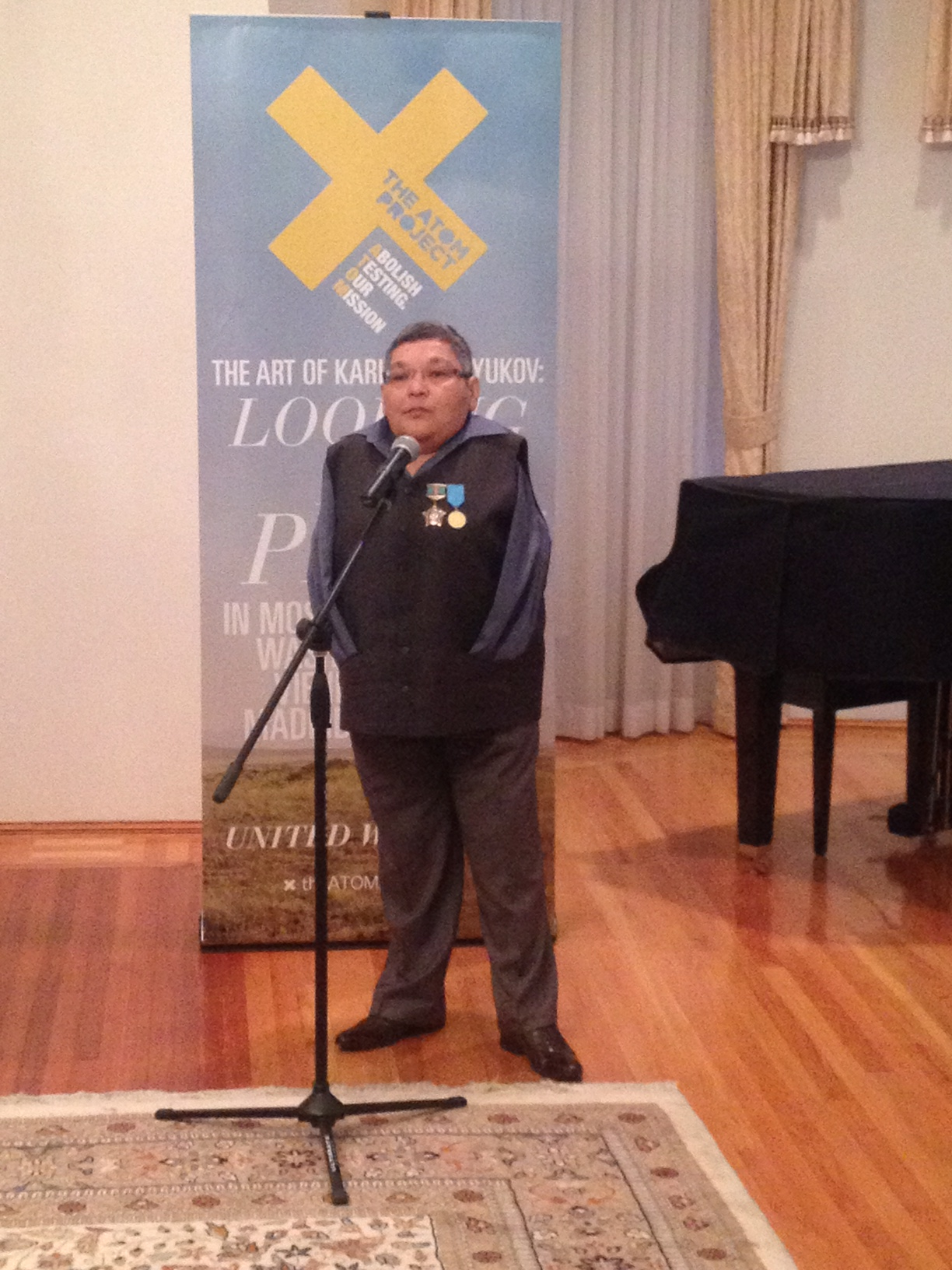
Kuyukov in 2013

Karipbek Kuyukov (Kazakh: Кәріпбек Күйіков, pronounced [kæ.rɪp.ˈpek kyj.ˈyk.ɵp]) is a Kazakh painter born without arms as a result of exposure to nuclear radiation from Soviet nuclear testing in Eastern Kazakhstan. Kuyukov is a global advocate for the cessation of nuclear weapons testing and worldwide nuclear disarmament. He is the Honorary Ambassador for The ATOM Project.

== Early life ==
Kuyukov was born in the village of Yegindybulak, just 60 miles (97 km) from where the Soviet Union conducted more than 450 nuclear weapons tests from 1949 to 1989 on where is today the territory of Kazakhstan.

== Painting and artwork ==
Kuyukov paints holding brushes with his teeth and toes. He has dedicated his artistic life to painting impressions of the environmental and human devastation caused by nuclear weapons testing.

== Other activism ==
Kuyukov was appointed Honorary Ambassador of The ATOM Project at its launch in 2012.

As the ATOM Project Honorary Ambassador, Kuyukov addressed on September 6, 2018 a special session of the UN General Assembly commemorating the International Day against Nuclear Tests. During his address, Kuyukov delivered a plea to the world and countries possessing nuclear weapons to act to legally ban such testing.

According to Radio Free Europe/Radio Liberty, Kuyukov said that he was denied a British travel visa in 2013 with the explanation that his 'fingerprints are of poor quality'. After media reports of the incident the British consulate in Almaty apologized to Kuyukov and issued a visa.

== Awards ==
Kuyukov received the Nuclear-Free Future Award in Salzburg, Austria, on October 24, 2018. Receiving the award, Kuyukov announced that he intended to spend the prize money on preserving his home village of Yegindibulak, just 100 km from the nuclear test site.
