= Germans of Kazakhstan =

Germanic ethnic group in Kazakhstan

Kasachstandeutsche; Қазақстандық немістер

Total population
- 226,092 (2021 census)

Languages
- German; Kazakh; Russian

Religion
- Protestantism; minorities of Roman Catholics, Eastern Orthodoxy, Irreligious

Related ethnic groups
- Russian Kazakhstanis, German Poles

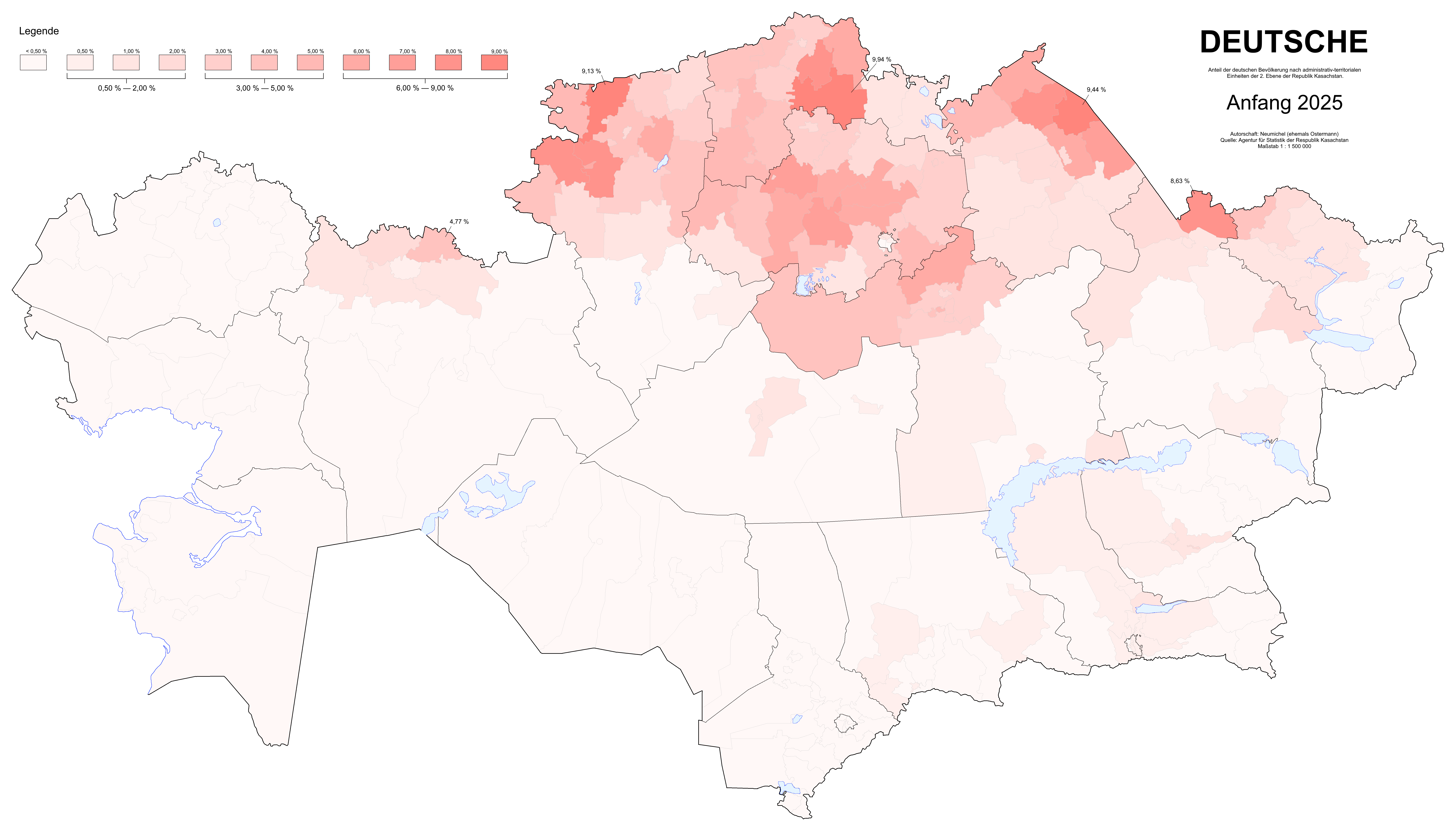
Share of ethnic Germans in Kazakhstan by district (2025)

The German Kazakhs or Germans of Kazakhstan (German: Kasachstandeutsche; Kazakh: Қазақстандық немістер, romanized: Qazaqstandyq nemıster) are a minority in Kazakhstan, and make up a small percentage of the population. Today they live mostly in the northeastern part of the country between the cities of Astana and Oskemen, the majority being urban dwellers.

Their number peaked at nearly 1 million (957 thousand people per 1989 census) near the time of the Soviet dissolution, but most have emigrated since then, usually to Germany or Russia. However, after a significant decrease from 1989 to 2009, by 2015 the number had seen a slight increase of a few thousand, the first time since the dissolution of the Soviet Union. Between 2009 and 2021 the German population had increased by 26.7%, though mostly due to changes in patterns of ethnic identity rather than actual population growth.

== History ==
German historical population of Kazakhstan
Year	Pop.	±%
1897	2,613	—
1926	51,094	+1855.4%
1939	92,571	+81.2%
1959	659,751	+612.7%
1970	839,649	+27.3%
1979	900,207	+7.2%
1989	957,518	+6.4%
1999	353,441	−63.1%
2009	178,409	−49.5%
2021	226,092	+26.7%

Most Germans in Kazakhstan are the descendants of Volga Germans, who were deported to the then Soviet republic of Kazakhstan from the Volga German Autonomous Soviet Socialist Republic soon after the Nazi German Invasion during World War II. Large portions of the community were imprisoned in the Soviet labor camp system.

After the deportation, Volga Germans, as well as other deported minorities, were subject to imposed cultural assimilation into the Russian culture. The methods to achieve that goal included the prohibition of public use of the German language and education in German, the abolition of German ethnic holidays and a prohibition on their observance in public and a ban on relocation among others.

Those measures had been enacted by Joseph Stalin, even though the Volga German community as a whole was in no way affiliated with Nazi Germany, and Volga Germans had been loyal citizens of the Russian Empire (and later the Soviet Union) for centuries. These restrictions ended, however, during the "Khrushchev Thaw".

In 1972, over 3,500 German Russians sent a petition to Moscow again requesting an autonomous republic in the Volga regions. The government responded with an ad hoc committee to study this request. In 1976, the commission finally agreed to create an autonomous oblast (county) in Northern Kazakhstan, centered in Ereymentau, 140 kilometers from Tselinograd (Virgin Land City and capital of the virgin lands district). The district would be partially located in the “virgin lands,” which had already put 41.8 million hectares into agricultural production, although this area had been one of the least developed in Kazakhstan.

The success of Khrushchev's agricultural focus was largely due to the labor of the ethnic Germans exiled there. This government proposal created much opposition in Kazakhstan from residents, including a public protest, a rarity in the Soviet Union; every effort was made to keep the demonstration secret. Local Communist Party leaders also strongly opposed the plan, as it would diminish their authority in the Kazakh SSR. Ultimately, nothing came of the idea, which lacked support from even the German Russians, who tended to believe that reconstitution of the Volga Republic was the only way toward full rehabilitation and restoration of their rights.

According to a 1989 census, more citizens of ethnic German origin lived in Kazakhstan (numbering 957,518, or 5.8% of the total population) than in the whole of Russia, including Siberia (841,295).

Due to the German right of return law that enables ethnic Germans abroad who had been forcibly deported to return to Germany, Volga Germans could immigrate to Germany after the dissolution of the Soviet Union. But due to widespread abuse of the system and the lack of interest on the part of the heavily-Russified newly arrived immigrants to assimilate, Germany tightened the policy during the early 21st century. By 2009, Russia had replaced Germany as the major immigrant destination for German Kazakhstanis. In 1999, there were 353,441 Germans remaining in Kazakhstan.

A small number of Germans have returned to Kazakhstan from Germany during the last several years, unable to assimilate into the German cultural sphere. The Rebirth organization, founded in 1989, handles cultural and community affairs of the ethnic German community.

Most Germans of Kazakhstan speak only Russian. Most were historically followers of Protestantism, but some are Roman Catholic. Today many, possibly the majority, are irreligious. The heaviest concentrations of Germans in Kazakhstan can be found along the cities and villages in the Northern region, such as Uspen, Taran, and Borodulikha.

The 2021 Census revealed for the first time since the dissolution of the USSR, that the ethnic German population of Kazakhstan had increased to 226,092 from 178,409 in 2009.

== See also ==
- Germany–Kazakhstan relations
- Demographics of Kazakhstan
- Population transfer in the Soviet Union
- German as a minority language
