= On the State Independence of the Republic of Kazakhstan =

1991 Kazakh SSR constitutional law

Supreme Soviet of the Kazakh SSR
- Long title: Constitutional Law of the Republic of Kazakhstan "On the State Independence of the Republic of Kazakhstan"
- Citation: 1007-XII
- Territorial extent: Kazakhstan
- Passed by: Supreme Soviet of the Kazakh SSR
- Passed: 16 December 1991
- Signed by: President Nursultan Nazarbayev
- Signed: 16 December 1991
- Effective: 16 December 1991
- Administered by: Supreme Soviet of the Kazakh SSR
- Introduced by: Sultan Sartaev
- Voting summary: 270 voted for; 12 voted against; 2 abstained; 3 absent

Summary
- Declared the Republic of Kazakhstan an independent state, establishing full control over its domestic and foreign affairs; adopted by majority vote of the Supreme Soviet of the Kazakh SSR.

Keywords
- Declaration of independence
- Status: In force

The Constitutional Law "On the State Independence of the Republic of Kazakhstan" (Kazakh: «Қазақстан Республикасының мемлекеттік тәуелсіздігі туралы» Конституциялық заң, romanized: «Qazaqstan Respublikasynyñ memlekettık täuelsızdıgı turaly» Konstitutsiialyq zañ; Russian: Конституционный закон «О государственной независимости Республики Казахстан») was adopted on 16 December 1991 by the Supreme Soviet of the Kazakh Soviet Socialist Republic. With this law, Kazakhstan was declared a sovereign, democratic, and independent state, thereby affirming its complete separation from the Soviet Union and becoming the last of the former Soviet republics to declare independence.

== Background ==
In the late 1980s and early 1990s, the Soviet Union entered a period of profound political and economic crisis. Movements for sovereignty emerged across the republics, and Kazakhstan took its first formal step with the adoption of the Declaration on State Sovereignty of the Kazakh SSR on 25 October 1990. That declaration affirmed the supremacy of republican laws, the right to independent foreign policy, and the preservation of national culture and identity.

The failed August 1991 coup in Moscow further undermined the authority of Soviet institutions, and one republic after another proclaimed independence. Kazakhstan, the largest republic in Central Asia, became the last of the fifteen Soviet republics to formally adopt a declaration of independence.

== Adoption ==
On 14 December 1991, a joint meeting of the Supreme Soviet of the Republic of Kazakhstan of the 12th convocation opened under the chairmanship of Serikbolsyn Abdildin. The deputies, who had previously adopted the Declaration of State Sovereignty of Kazakhstan (1990) and created the office of the presidency, placed on the agenda a draft independence law prepared by deputy Sultan Sartaev with the assistance of legal and constitutional experts. Debate over the following days addressed questions such as the status of the state language, the rights of ethnic minorities, and the scope of presidential eligibility. An editorial commission was established to revise the text in response to amendments. The date of the debate coincided with the fifth anniversary of the December 1986 Jeltoqsan events, though this was not deliberately planned.

Deliberations continued over several days. Some deputies voiced concerns regarding the implications of full independence, particularly for the Russian-speaking population. Others emphasized the need for immediate adoption, given that Kazakhstan remained the last of the former Soviet republics yet to declare sovereignty. President Nursultan Nazarbayev personally addressed the chamber on 16 December 1991, urging deputies to pass the law and stressing its historical significance.

That afternoon, after revisions by an editorial commission, the draft was put to a vote. According to contemporary reports, 270 deputies supported the law, 12 opposed it, two abstained, and three did not participate, out of a total of 360. The Constitutional Law "On the State Independence of the Republic of Kazakhstan" was adopted at 18:14 local time, following which Nazarbayev signed the law into effect at 18:44, finalising Kazakhstan's legal establishment as an independent state.

== Content ==
The Constitutional Law consists of seven chapters and eighteen articles. Its provisions established the legal and political foundations of Kazakhstan's statehood.

On the State Independence of the Republic of Kazakhstan
| Chapter | | | | Articles | Summary |
| # | English | Kazakh | Russian | Articles | Summary |
|---|---|---|---|---|---|
| 1 | Republic of Kazakhstan – Independent State | Қазақстан Республикасы — тәуелсіз мемлекет | Республика Казахстан – независимое государство | 1–5 | Declares Kazakhstan an independent, democratic, and legal state; affirms supremacy of its constitution and laws; establishes territorial integrity and inviolability. |
| 2 | People and Citizens of the Republic of Kazakhstan | Қазақстан Республикасының халқы мен азаматы | Народ и гражданин Республики Казахстан | 6–8 | Defines citizenship, guarantees equality of rights and freedoms regardless of nationality or religion, regulates migration and return of deported/expelled Kazakhs, and affirms cultural and linguistic revival. |
| 3 | Public Authorities of the Republic of Kazakhstan | Қазақстан Республикасының мемлекеттік өкімет органдары | Органы государственной власти Республики Казахстан | 9–10 | Establishes separation of powers; defines the roles of the Supreme Council (legislative), President (executive), and judicial institutions including the Constitutional Court. |
| 4 | Economic Fundamentals of State Independence | Қазақстан Республикасының мемлекеттік тәуелсіздігінің экономикалық негіздері | Экономические основы государственной независимости Республики Казахстан | 11–12 | Declares natural resources the exclusive property of Kazakhstan; affirms independent economic and financial system, with its own National Bank, currency reserves, tax and customs systems. |
| 5 | Republic of Kazakhstan – A Member of the World Community | Қазақстан Республикасы – дүниежүзілік қоғамдастықтың мүшесі | Республика Казахстан – член мирового сообщества | 13–14 | Recognizes international law; affirms right to conduct foreign policy, exchange diplomatic representatives, join international organizations, and engage in foreign economic activity. |
| 6 | Protection of State Independence | Қазақстан Республикасының мемлекеттік тәуелсіздігін қорғау | Охрана государственной независимости Республики Казахстан | 15–16 | Asserts the right to defend independence and territorial integrity; authorizes formation of national armed forces; prohibits external interference in domestic affairs. |
| 7 | Final Provisions | Қорытынды ережелер | Заключительные положения | 17–18 | Establishes state symbols (flag, coat of arms, anthem) and Alma-Ata as the capital; stipulates that this law, together with the 1990 Declaration of Sovereignty, forms the basis of a new Constitution. |

== Aftermath ==
The adoption of the independence law marked Kazakhstan's definitive exit from the Soviet Union. Shortly after:

- 21 December 1991: Kazakhstan hosted the Alma-Ata meeting, where 11 former Soviet republics signed the Alma-Ata Protocol establishing the Commonwealth of Independent States (CIS).
- 25 December: Mikhail Gorbachev resigned as President of the USSR.
- 26 December: The Soviet Union was formally dissolved.

Kazakhstan's independence was promptly recognized by the international community. Turkey was the first country to extend recognition on the day of independence, followed by other states including Russia, Iran, Switzerland, Brazil, Hungary, Australia, and Japan. The United States formally recognized Kazakhstan's independence on 25 December 1991, when U.S. President George H.W. Bush announced the decision in an address to the nation regarding the dissolution of the Soviet Union. In March 1992, Kazakhstan was admitted as a member of the United Nations, solidifying its status as a sovereign state in the international system.

== Legacy ==
Independence Day is observed annually on 16 December. It is regarded as the principal national holiday of Kazakhstan, marking the foundation of the country's modern statehood.

The 1991 Declaration of Independence of Kazakhstan is considered a cornerstone of the republic's legal and political system. It provided the basis for Kazakhstan's international recognition and for the establishment of independent state institutions. In historical and official accounts, the constitutional law is described as the culmination of the sovereignty movement of 1990 and the decisive step in Kazakhstan's emergence as a subject of international law. It also marked the republic's position as the last of the former Soviet states to declare independence.

The independence law created the legal and political conditions for the drafting of a new constitution. This process led to the adoption of the 1993 Constitution of Kazakhstan, which gave constitutional force to the principles proclaimed in 1991, including sovereignty, democracy, and the protection of citizens’ rights. The 1993 Constitution further institutionalized Kazakhstan’s statehood by establishing a parliament, defining the presidency, and enshrining the separation of powers. Although later replaced by the 1995 Constitution of Kazakhstan, the 1993 Constitution is regarded as the immediate successor to the act of independence, transforming the political declarations of 1991 into a comprehensive legal order.

== See also ==
- Independence Day (Kazakhstan)
- Declaration of State Sovereignty of Kazakhstan
- Dissolution of the Soviet Union
