= Kazakhstan and the United Nations =

Republic of Kazakhstan

United Nations membership
- Membership: Full member
- Since: 2 March 1992
- UNSC seat: Non-permanent
- Ambassador: Magzhan Ilyassov

The Republic of Kazakhstan became a member of the United Nations on March 2, 1992. Kazakhstan was elected to serve on the UN Security Council for the 2017–2018 term. UN Secretary-General António Guterres in remarks to the UNSC recognized Kazakhstan's work to rid the world of weapons of mass destruction and global non-proliferation efforts.

== The position of Kazakhstan ==
The position of Kazakhstan in the UN is formed on the basis of interests of Kazakhstan on the full range of issues addressed by the United Nations. Particular attention is given to strengthening cooperation under the auspices of the Organization in the field of disarmament, economy, ecology, social and sustainable development, peacekeeping, development of international law, respect for human rights, gender equality, counter-terrorism, organized crime and drug trafficking. The president of the Republic of Kazakhstan visited the UN headquarters in New York eleven times between 1992 and 2016 and repeatedly participated in the work of the UN General Assembly. The head of state took part in the seventieth anniversary session of the UN General Assembly, as well as the UN Summit on Sustainable Development Goals in September 2015.

=== Afghanistan ===
As UNSC member and during its rotation as council president, Kazakhstan maintains focus on Afghanistan, and has circulated concept notes that outline areas requiring intervention to achieve stability and security in Afghanistan. As UNSC president, Kazakhstan led in January 2018 the first delegation of ambassadors to Afghanistan since 2010. The high level delegation consisted of all fifteen UNSC members, including eleven permanent representatives.

=== Counter-terrorism ===
Kazakhstan recognizes the United Nations' role in the fight against international terrorism. Kazakhstan has called on UN member states that had not done so to adopt the United Nations' 13 International Conventions on Terrorism. Kazakhstan is the first Central Asian country to serve on the UN Security Council. Kazakhstan's Foreign Minister Kairat Abdrakhmanov and Permanent Representative Kairat Umarov convened on the sidelines of the 73rd General Assembly a High Level Event for member nations to sign a Code of Conduct in a pledge to implement the United Nations Global Counter-Terrorism Strategy (GCTS) and other legally binding instruments.

=== Environment and climate ===
Kazakhstan signed the United Nations Framework Convention on Climate Change in 1992. Kazakhstan has always been an active proponent for combating climate change. In 2015, the country launched a Project on Supporting Kazakhstan's transition towards Green Economy model, funded by the European Union and implemented by the United Nations Development Programme (UNDP). The project aims to boost Kazakhstan's long-term environmental sustainability contributing to inclusive economic development.

=== Global peace and peacekeeping ===
Kazakhstan has stated in official letter to the secretary general and Security Council that sustainable global peace will not be possible without comprehensive peace and security in Africa.

Kazakhstan is also actively involved in the UN's peacekeeping missions in the Middle East. The country plans to deploy by the end of October 2018 120 servicemen to the UN Interim Force in Lebanon together with Indian peacekeepers.

=== Human rights; political and civil rights ===
Kazakhstan is one of 47 members of the UN Human Rights Council. Kazakhstan is party to the International Covenant on Civil and Political Rights which gave legal status to the Declaration of Human Rights. In 2020 Kazakhstan signed the international protocol on abolition of death penalty to formally renounce the punishment. Amnesty International called it an "important step".

=== Building trust ===
President Nazarbayev chaired the Security Council in January 2018 and identified the Joint Comprehensive Plan of Action (JCPOA) as a model for rebuilding trust among members.

=== Nuclear disarmament and nonproliferation ===
The cornerstone of Kazakhstan's foreign policy and top policy priority at the United Nations is to rid the world of nuclear weapons and their testing. Soon after national independence and UN membership, President Nazarbayev declared intentions to decommission more than 1400 inherited nuclear weapons from the former Soviet Union. While serving as Security Council president in January 2018, Kazakh Ambassador Umarov prioritized a high-level briefing on nonproliferation and confidence building measures.

== The main international initiatives of Kazakhstan ==
Kazakhstan supports the UN Charter and priorities of peace and security, economic development, social development, the environment, international law, humanitarian issues, and health. During its membership in the UN, in different years, Kazakhstan has put forward the following initiatives that have been or are being implemented.

- Convocation of the Conference on Interaction and Confidence Building measures in Central Asia (CICA). Kazakhstan's President Nursultan Nazarbayev first proposed CICA on October 5, 1992, during the 47th session of the UN General Assembly.
- United Nations Special Program for the Economies of Central Asia (SPECA);
- Rehabilitation of the ecological disaster zones of the Aral Sea and Semipalatinsk;
- The Green Bridge Partnership Program, which was supported at two Conferences of the UN Regional Commissions (ESCAP and UNECE) and the United Nations Conference on Sustainable Development Rio + 20;
- Development of the Global Energy and Environmental Strategy, the main components of which are reflected in the final document of the United Nations Conference on Sustainable Development Rio + 20;
- Announcement of August 29 as the International Day Against Nuclear Tests;
- Kazakhstan presented The ATOM Project at the United Nations on September 4, 2013, a global campaign to end testing of nuclear weapons.
- Announcement of 2010 and 2013–2022 as the International Year and the International Decade for the Rapprochement of Cultures;
- In order to implement the initiatives of the President of the Republic of Kazakhstan N. Nazarbayev to combat terrorism and counter violent extremism with the UN counter-terrorism units and with member states, work is being carried out to incorporate the main postulates of the initiative in the activities of the Organization and their reflection in UN documents.
- Manifesto of the Head of State "The World. XXI Century "was sent to the UN leadership and distributed in six official languages among all UN member states with registration numbers A / 70/818 as a document of the General Assembly and S / 2016/317 as a document of the Security Council.
- Initiatives to convene a high-level UN Conference on the reaffirmation of the principles of international law, the creation of the United Nations Center for the Development of Green Technologies and Investment Projects under the auspices of the United Nations in Astana, the annual transfer of one percent of the defense budget of the UN member states to the UN Special Fund for Financing the Goals of Sustainable Development, reform of ECOSOC to the Council for Global Development.
- Initiative for the establishment of the UN Regional Hub for Central Asia and Afghanistan in Almaty.
- The UN General Assembly adopted the Universal Declaration on the Achievement of a Nuclear Weapon-Free World during its 73rd session. The Universal Declaration was introduced by Kazakhstan.
- The UN and Kazakhstan have a formal Partnership Framework For Development to span between 2016 and 2020.

== Participation with UN organizations and commissions ==
Currently, the UN is represented by over 20 organizations in Kazakhstan: UNDP (United Nations Development Program), UNICEF (United Nations Children's Fund), UNODC (United Nations Office on Drugs and Crime), UNHCR (Office of the United Nations High Commissioner for Human Rights), UNFPA (United Nations Population Fund), UNV (United Nations Volunteers programme), ILO (International Labor Organization), UNESCO (United Nations Educational, Scientific and Cultural Organization), WHO (World Health Organization), WB (World Bank), IMF (International Monetary Fund), UNAIDS (Joint United Nations Program on HIV / AIDS), DPI (Office of the Department of Public Information), OCHA (United Nations Office for the Coordination of Humanitarian Affairs), ESCAP (Economic and Social Commission for Asia and the Pacific), UNECE (United Nations Economic Commission for Europe ), UNISDR (UN International Strategy for Disaster Reduction) and UN Women.

== Cooperation of the Government of the Republic of Kazakhstan with the UN ==
The government of Kazakhstan cooperates with in-country UN offices with the goals of cultivating public healthy initiatives, a green economy, and market-based economy and civic society engagement through economic, social and political modernization.

The cooperation is carried out within the framework of the Partnership Framework for Development for the period 2016–2020. Among the priorities of the new program cycle, it is possible to highlight issues of sustainable development, environmental improvement, prevention of HIV/AIDS and tuberculosis, gender equality and enhancing the effectiveness of public administration. The problem of efficient use of water resources and combating desertification remain the focus of joint cooperation. Particular attention will be given to the regions of the former Semipalatinsk test site and the Aral Sea.
