= Independence Square, Astana =

Main public square in Astana, Kazakhstan

Coordinates: 51.122°N 71.470°E

Independence Square
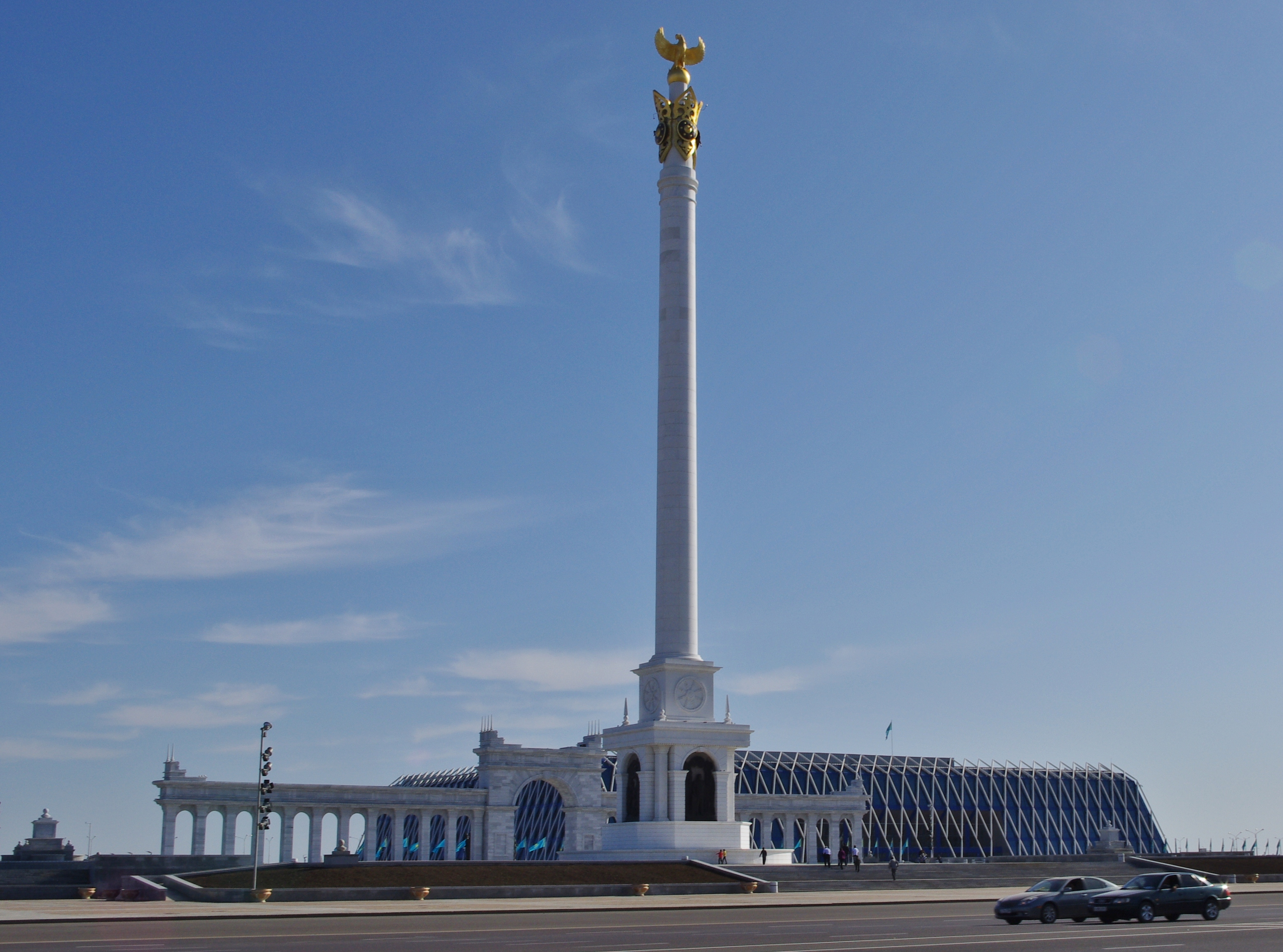
- The Kazakh Eli Monument
- Interactive map of Independence Square
- Native name: Тәуелсіздік алаңы (Kazakh); Täuelsızdık alaŋy (Kazakh)
- Type: Square
- Area: 5.2 hectares
- Location: Astana, Kazakhstan

Construction
- Completion: October 2009

Independence Square (Kazakh: Тәуелсіздік алаңы, romanized: Täuelsızdık alañy) also referred to as Kazakh Eli Square, is the main square in Astana, Kazakhstan.

It was created in October 2009. In September 2015, the square transformed into a historic village in honor of the 550th anniversary of the Kazakh Khanate. Defender of the Fatherland Day and Constitution Day parades have generally been held on the square. Earlier in 2015, the Banner of Victory was brought to Astana to be trooped through Independence Square by personnel of the Aibyn Presidential Regiment in the Defender of the Fatherland Day/Victory Day parade on 7 May. Nauryz events are also held at the square.

== Landmarks ==
- Palace of Peace and Reconciliation
- Kazakh Eli monument
- Shabyt Palace of Creativity
- Hazrat Sultan Mosque
- Palace of Independence
- National Museum of the Republic of Kazakhstan

== Gallery ==
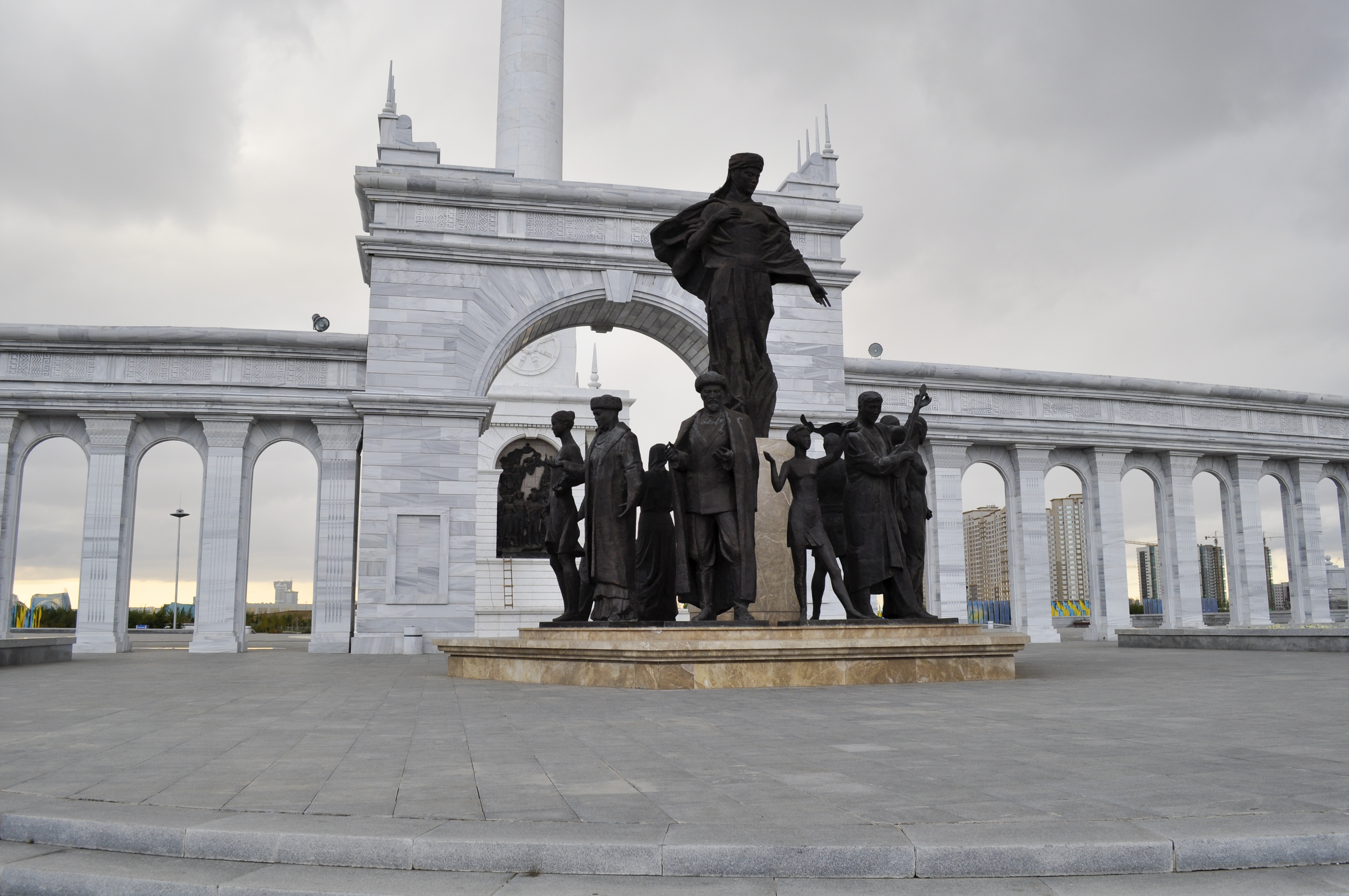

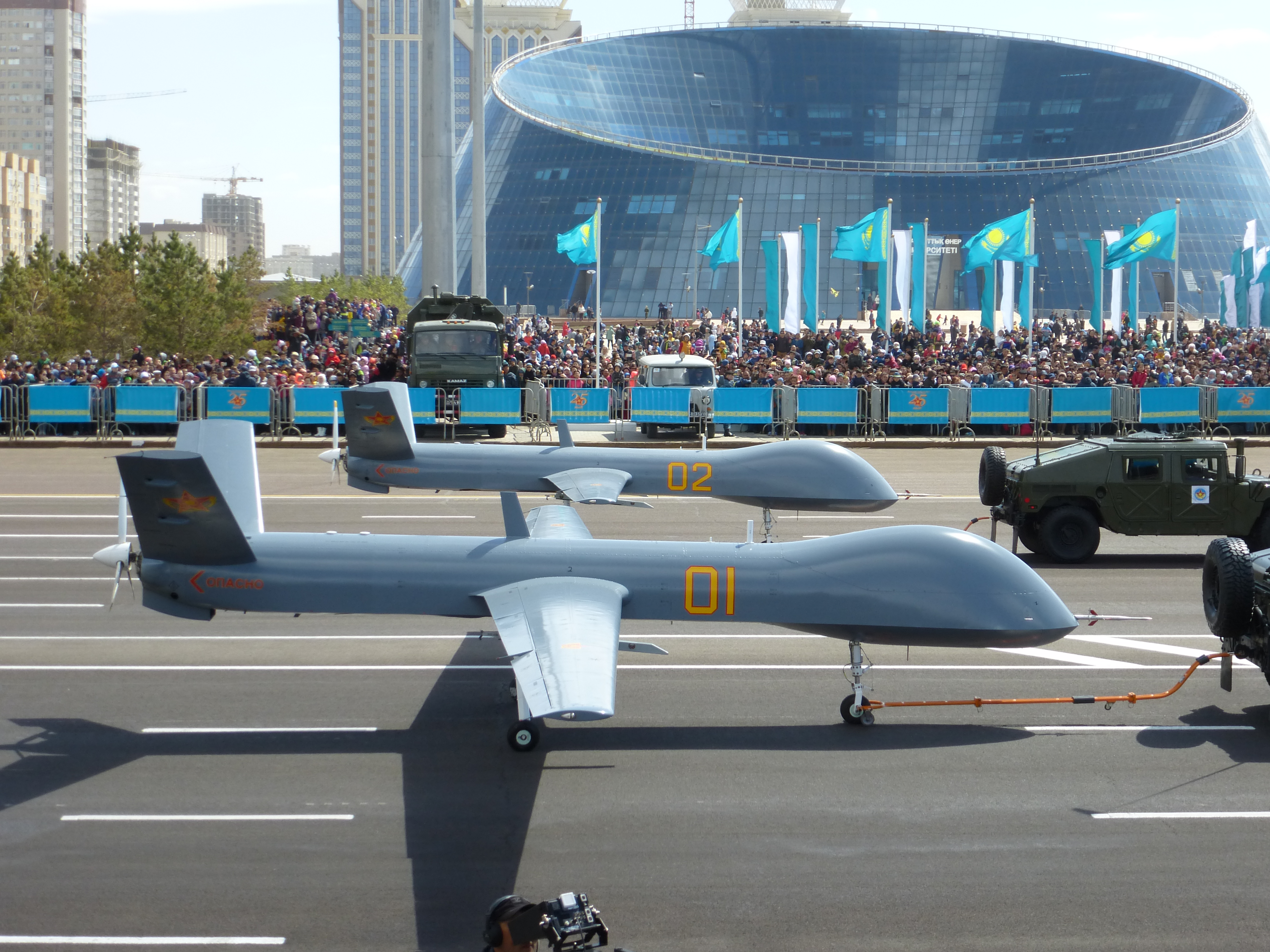
An air force CAIG Wing Loong during a Defender of the Fatherland Day parade on Independence Square in Astana.

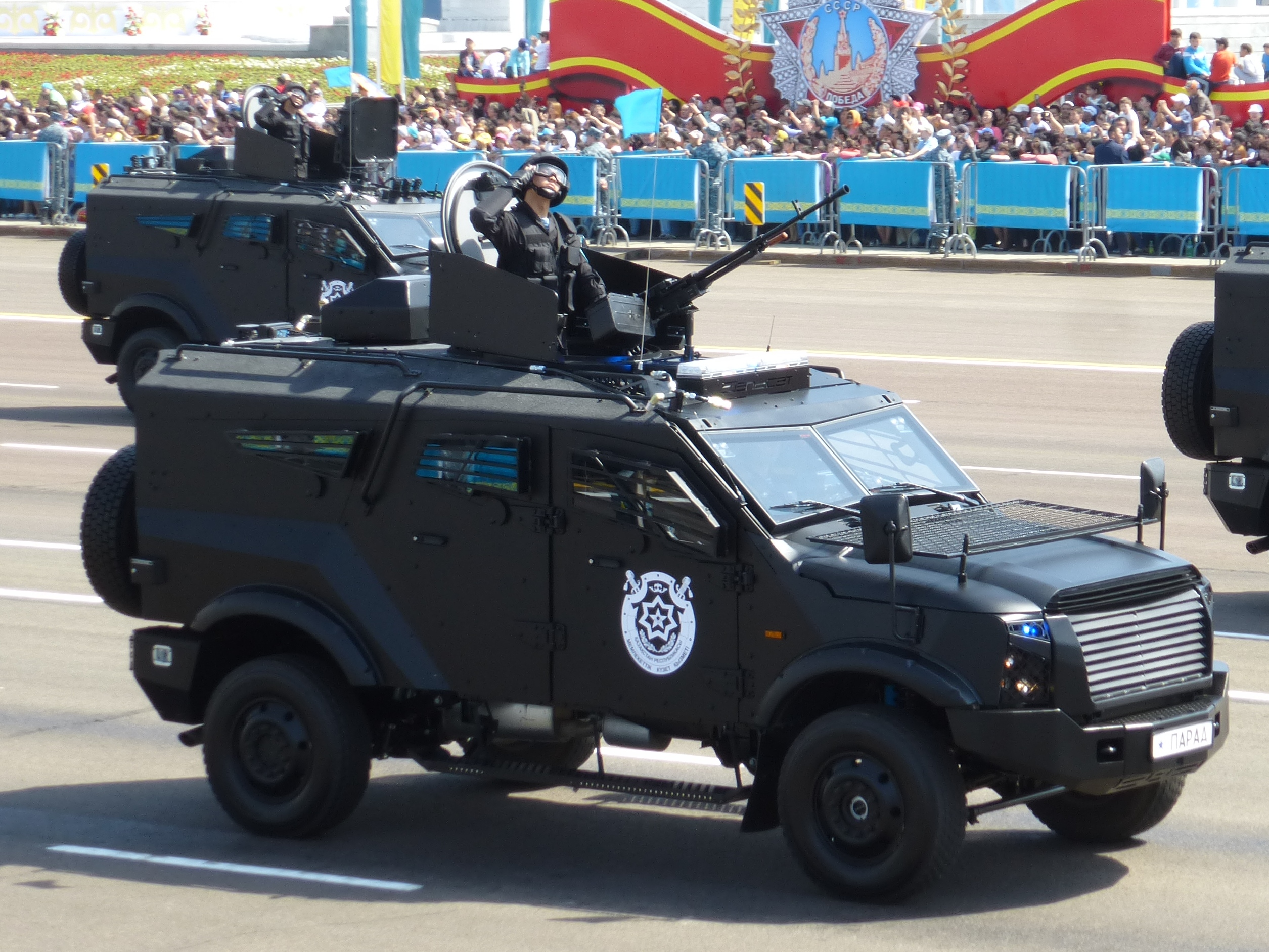
Military vehicles in the square during a parade in 2015

The Hazret Sultan Mosque
