= 2023 in Kazakhstan =

- Decades: 2000s; 2010s; 2020s
- See also: Other events of 2023; Timeline of Kazakhstani history

Events in the year 2023 in Kazakhstan.

== Incumbents ==
Photo	Post	Name
	Chairman of the Security Council of Kazakhstan	Kassym-Jomart Tokayev
	President of Kazakhstan	Kassym-Jomart Tokayev
	Prime Minister of Kazakhstan	Älihan Smaiylov

== Events ==
=== Ongoing ===
- COVID-19 pandemic in Kazakhstan

=== January ===
- 14 January - 2023 Kazakh Senate election

=== February ===
- 13 February - A teenager wounds three students with an axe at a school in Petropavl, North Kazakhstan Region.
- 15 February - Kazakh President Kassym-Jomart Tokayev signs a law annulling many privileges of his predecessor Nursultan Nazarbayev, including lifetime financial support from the state, the right to address the nation and propose ideas to officials, and deprives his immediate family of legal immunity.

=== March ===
- 19 March - 2023 Kazakh legislative election: Ruling party Amanat wins the election to the Mäjilis.

=== October ===
- 16 October - Kazakhstan announces a ban on Hijabs in schools for students and teachers.
- 28 October - At least 45 people are killed and 18 injured in a fire in the Kostenko Mine in Kazakhstan.

=== December ===
- 29 December — Kazakh Foreign Ministry spokesman Aybek Smadiyarov stated in an interview with Kazinform that the Taliban is not designated as a terrorist organization by the UN Security Council.

== See also ==
- Outline of Kazakhstan
- List of Kazakhstan-related topics
- History of Kazakhstan
- List of Kazakhs
- List of Kazakh khans
