= Day of Interethnic Harmony and Cultural Diversity (Ukraine) =

Ukrainian commemorative day (21 May)

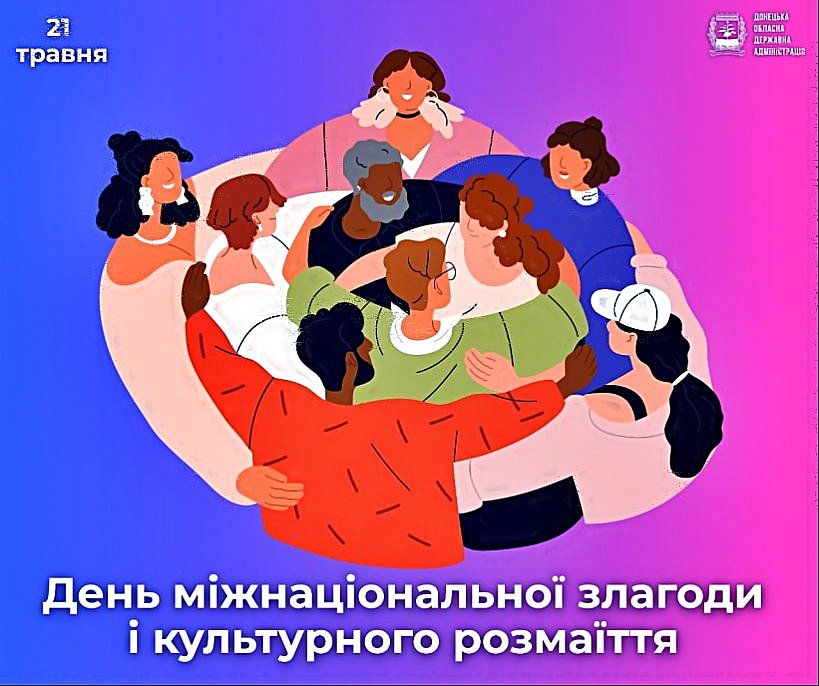
- Official banner of the Donetsk Regional State Administration for the Day of Interethnic Harmony and Cultural Diversity.
- Observed by: Ukraine
- Type: National
- Significance: Celebration of unity, cultural diversity, and contributions of national minorities and indigenous peoples
- Date: 21 May
- Frequency: annual
- Related to: World Day for Cultural Diversity for Dialogue and Development

The Day of Interethnic Harmony and Cultural Diversity (Ukrainian: День міжнаціональної злагоди і культурного розмаїття, romanized: Den’ mizhnatsional’noyi zlahody i kul’turnoho rozmayittia) is a commemorative day in Ukraine, observed annually on 21 May. It was established by Presidential Decree No. 883/2024, signed by President Volodymyr Zelenskyy on 27 December 2024. The first observance took place on 21 May 2025.

== Background ==
The day coincides with the World Day for Cultural Diversity for Dialogue and Development, proclaimed by the United Nations General Assembly in 2002 (Resolution 57/249). In August 2024, the State Service of Ukraine for Ethnic Policy and Freedom of Conscience conducted a survey on the need to introduce a new public holiday, the Day of Interethnic Harmony in Ukraine. Ukraine, home to more than 130 national communities, introduced the observance to highlight the role of indigenous peoples and national minorities in strengthening unity, fostering civic identity, and defending sovereignty.

== Significance ==
The purpose of this holiday is to unite Ukrainian society, protect the rights of national minorities and indigenous peoples of Ukraine, and honor their contribution to the ethno-cultural wealth of the country. The day is intended to symbolize unity in diversity and resistance to imperial depersonalization, and to serve as a reminder of tolerance, mutual respect, and joint efforts in building a peaceful society.

== See also ==
- World Day for Cultural Diversity for Dialogue and Development
- Kazakhstan People's Unity Day
- Unity Day (Russia)
- Racial Harmony Day (Singapore)
