= Defender of the Fatherland Day (Kazakhstan) =

National holiday in Kazakhstan

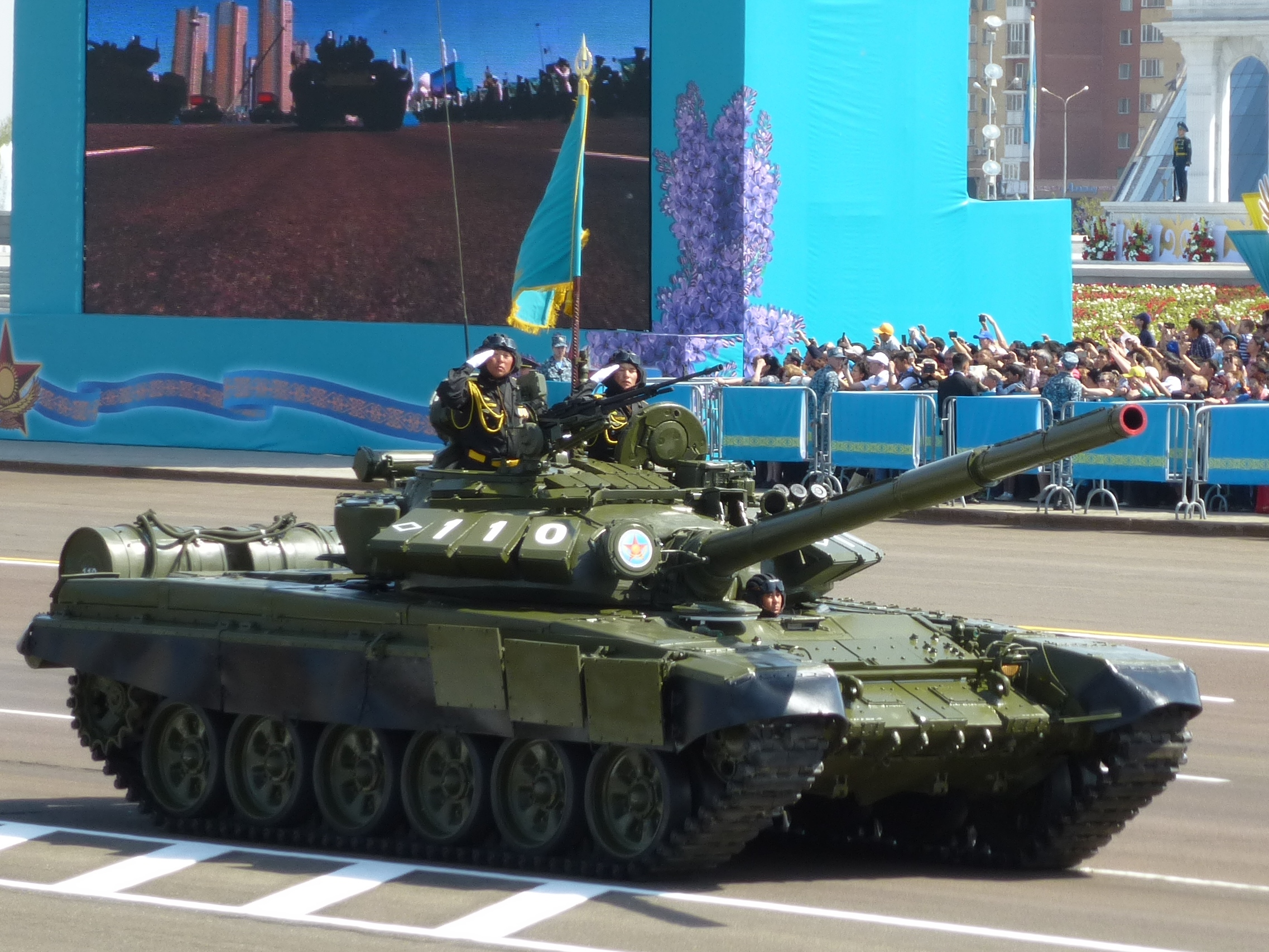
- A T-72 tank during a Defender of the Fatherland Day parade in 2015.
- Official name: Отан Қорғаушы күні День защитника Отечества
- Also called: Army Day; Armed Forces Day
- Observed by: Kazakhstan
- Liturgical color: Light Blue
- Significance: Commemorates the founding of the Kazakh Armed Forces
- Celebrations: Military Ceremonies; Presentation of awards; festive demonstrations; military concerts; Programs honouring the Kazakh Armed Forces on Kazakh TV
- Observances: Military parade on Independence Square in Astana (On special occasions it is held at the Otar Military Base in Jambyl Region)
- Date: 7 May
- Frequency: same day every year
- Related to: Kazakhstan Independence Day

Defender of the Fatherland Day (Kazakh: Отан Қорғаушы күні, Otan Qorğauşy künı; Russian: День защитника Отечества, Den' zashchitnika Otechestva) is a national holiday celebrated annually on 7 May, commemorating the founding of the Armed Forces of Kazakhstan. The event is marked by military parades, fireworks and ceremonies all around the country. The holiday is perceived in society as "a men's day" and is considered to be the Kazakh analogue to the International Women’s Day.

On 7 May 1992, then-President of Kazakhstan Nursultan Nazarbayev signed a decree on the establishment of the Armed Forces of the Republic of Kazakhstan. In October 2012, President Nazarbayev signed a further decree giving the holiday a status as a national holiday and enshrining it into law. National celebrations are usually led by the President of Kazakhstan, the Minister of Defense and the Chief of the General Staff.

== Commemorations ==
=== 2005 ===
A festive parade of troops on Defender of the Fatherland Day in 2005 was dedicated to the 60th anniversary of the end of the Great Patriotic War (known as the Second World War in the West). The parade was held at the square in front of the Otan Qorgaushylar Monument. 340 veterans with the Battle Banners of military units that served in the Red Army marched in the column, as well as parade crews of 3,500 servicemen. The parade involved about 200 units of modern military equipment, 32 aircraft and helicopters. The report of the commander of the parade, First Deputy Minister of Defense Bulat Darbekov was received by defense minister Mukhtar Altynbaev.

=== 2013 ===
2013 celebrated the 21st anniversary of the founding of the Kazakh Armed Forces. It was held at the Otar Military Base. Saule Aitpayeva was promoted to the rank of General, becoming first female general since Kazakhstan gained independence. The Kazakh defence ministry differentiated the parade from past ones by calling it a "Battle Parade" (Боевой парад), saying that Kazakh battle parades showcase the military through conducting ceremonial combat exercises during the ceremony. According to Roger McDermott, an analyst at the Jamestown Foundation, the parade was unusual in that it went against the precedent for Kazakh military parades, saying that the “pomp and ceremony” of military parade conceal deep processes in the military and that the battle parade shows that the national authorities are trying modernize the military to the "high technologies and standards of the 21st century".

=== 2014 ===
2014 celebrated the 22nd anniversary of the founding of the Kazakh Armed Forces. The parade commander was Lieutenant General Murat Maikeyev, who was the Commander-in-Chief of the Kazakh Ground Forces. Reporting to President Nursultan Nazarbayev was Kazakhstan's Defense Minister Serik Akhmetov. 2,000 soldiers, 56 air units, and 250 defense vehicles took part in the parade.

=== 2015 ===
2015 celebrated the 23rd anniversary of the Kazakh Armed Forces and the platinum jubilee (70th anniversary) of the Great Patriotic War. Noting the timing of the parade with the anniversary, President Nazarbayev said that it "shows the continuity of military traditions between the World War II winners and the current generation of defenders of our land." Minister of Defence Imangali Tasmagambetov accompanied President Nazarbayev in his inspection of the troops during the parade. An exact copy of the Victory Banner, was delivered to Astana from the Museum of Great Patriotic War in Moscow. It consisted of two parts – historic and contemporary, with the former being represented by troops depicting Kazakh field units of the Red Army, including the 72nd Guards Rifle Division that was raised in Akmolinsk (now Astana) in 1942. The legendary Katyusha rocket launcher was presented at the parade for the first time. Military pilots performed aerobatics singly and as part of aerobatic teams, and also built the number "70", which symbolizes the anniversary of the Great Victory.

=== 2017 ===
Celebrated the silver jubilee of the founding of the Kazakh military. The parade inspector was the Minister of Defence Colonel General Saken Zhasuzakov and the parade commander was the Commander in Chief of the Kazakh Ground Forces, Major General Murat Bektanov. More than 5,000 servicemen, around 300 units of military machinery and 70 military jets took part in the parade.

=== 2018 ===
Celebrated the 26th anniversary of the founding of the Kazakh Armed Forces. President Nazarbayev announced the creation of a new branch of the armed forces designed to combat cyber threats. It was the first parade at the Otar Military Base in 5 years. An exhibition of military equipment was unveiled at the base.

=== 2020 ===
The only major commemoration of the holiday to be cancelled in 2020 was the parade, due to honor the 75th anniversary of the Second World War. The cancellation was by order of President Kassym-Jomart Tokayev and was due to the COVID-19 pandemic in Kazakhstan. The State Philharmonic of Nur-Sultan announced on the eve of the holiday its intention to hold an online concert entitled Yel Yelinin Korgany (The stronghold of the people) in honor of the holiday.

=== 2025 ===
2025 celebrated the 33rd anniversary of the Kazakh Armed Forces and the 80th anniversary of the Great Patriotic War. In attendance was General Secretary of the Communist Party of Vietnam Tô Lâm and his wife Ngô Phương Ly, who visited Astana on a state visit from 6-7 May.

== Gallery ==
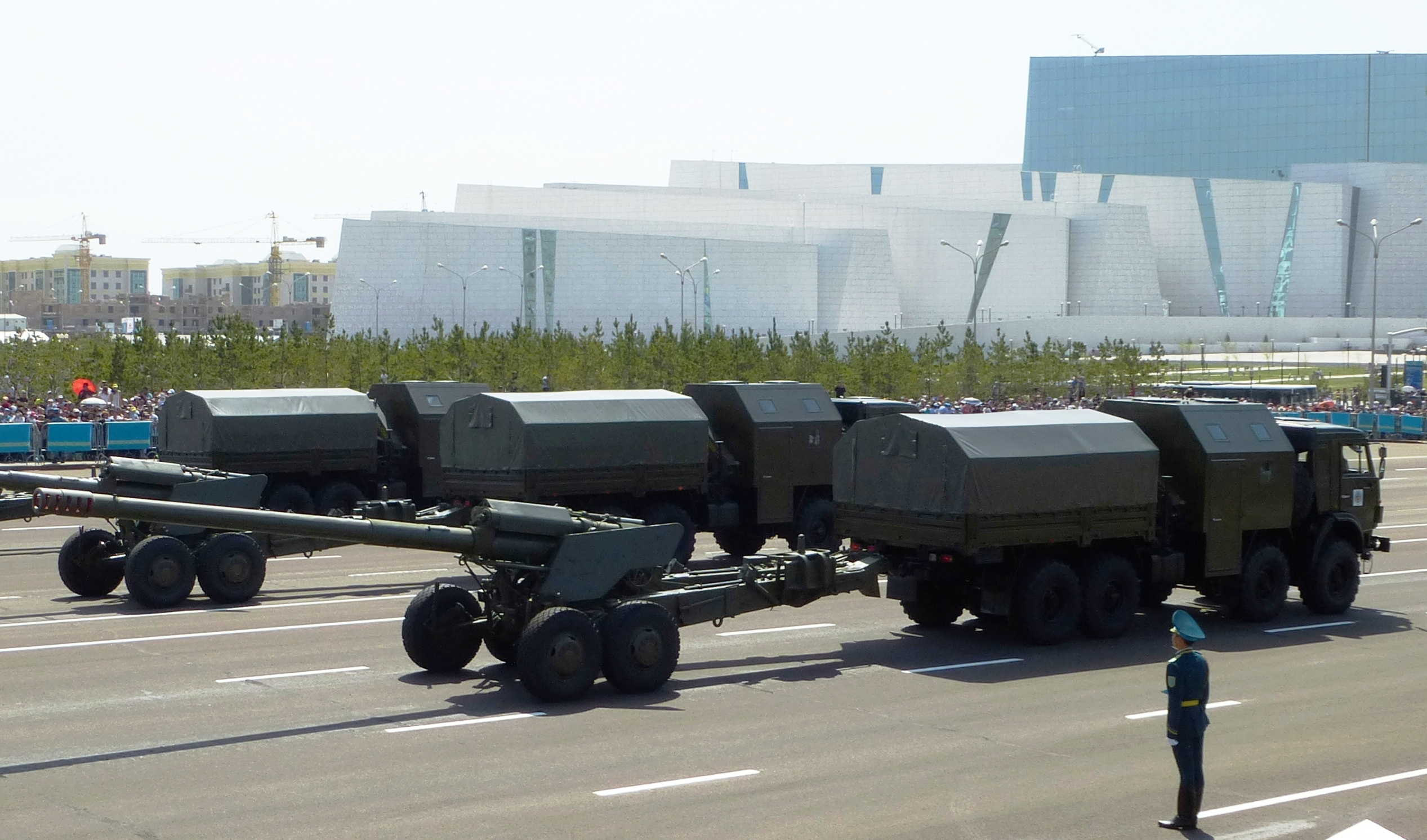

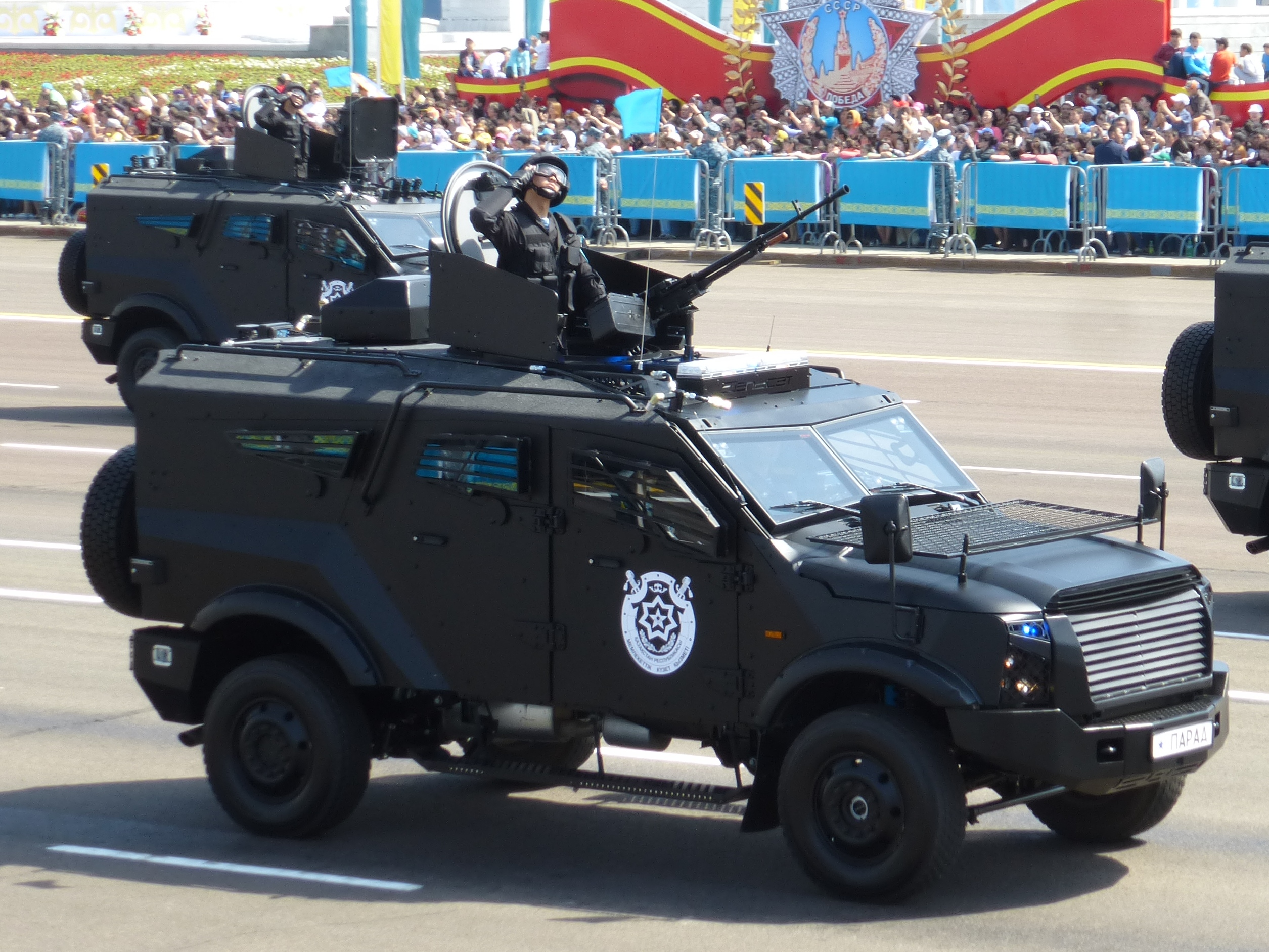

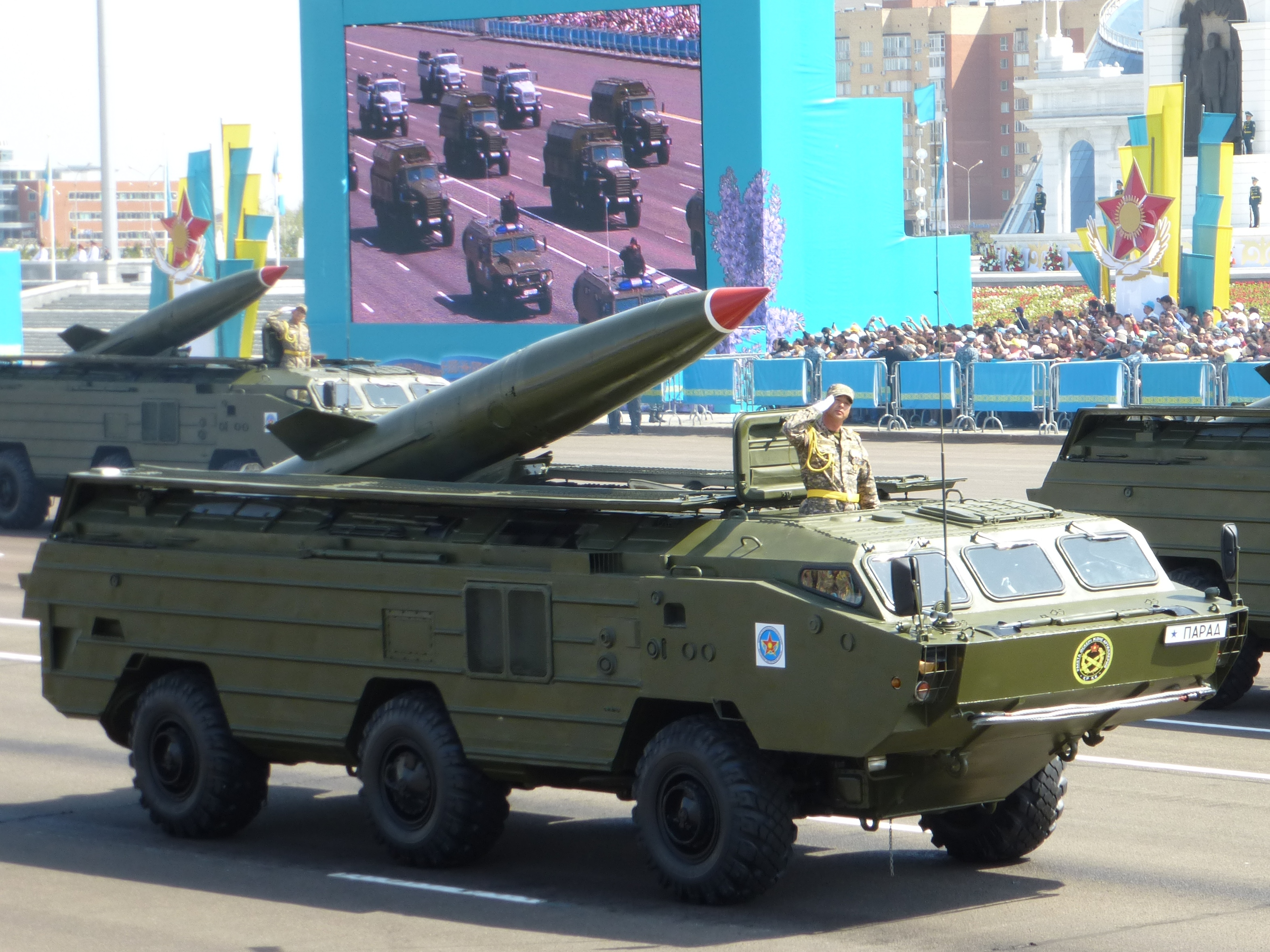

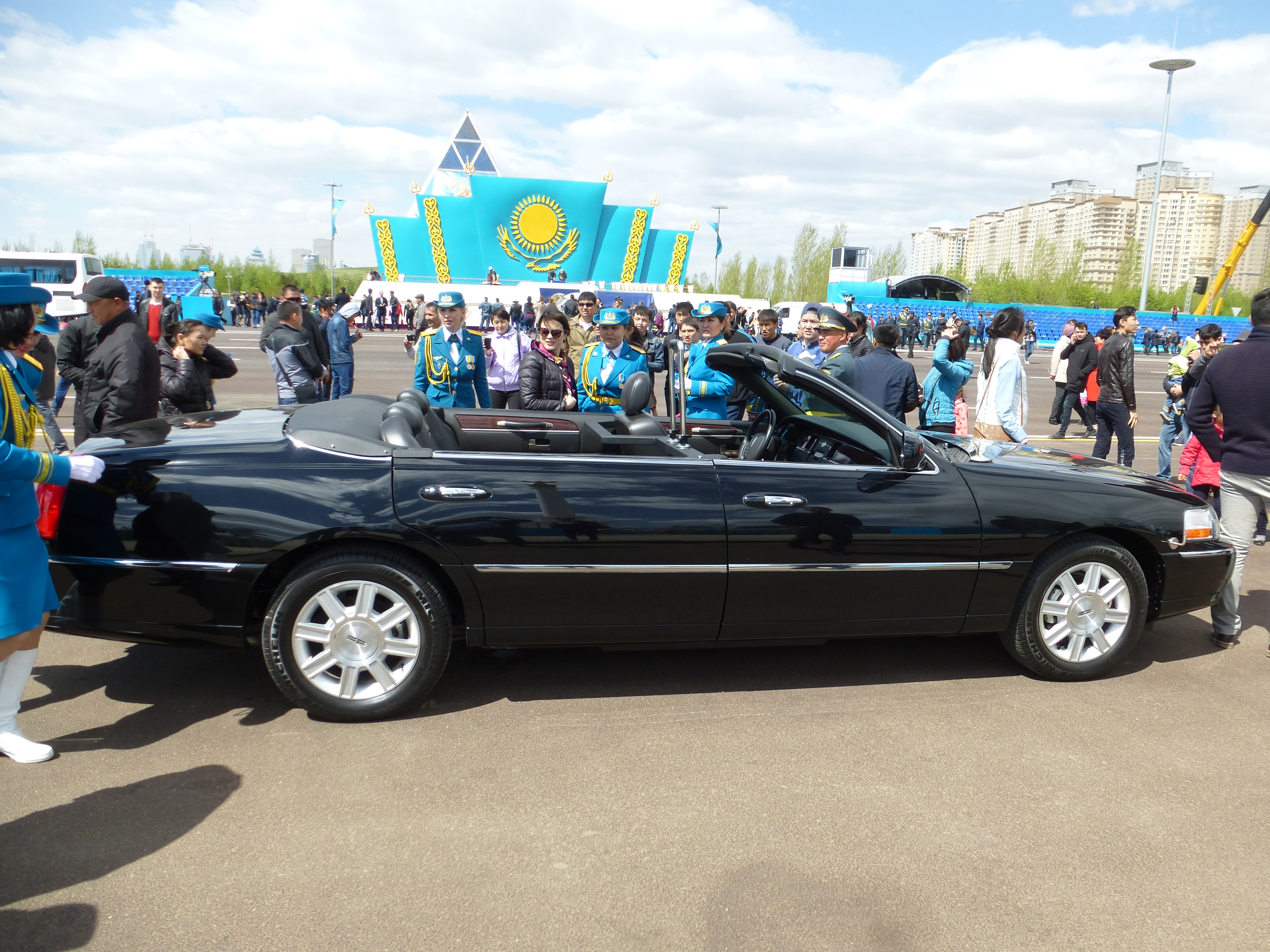

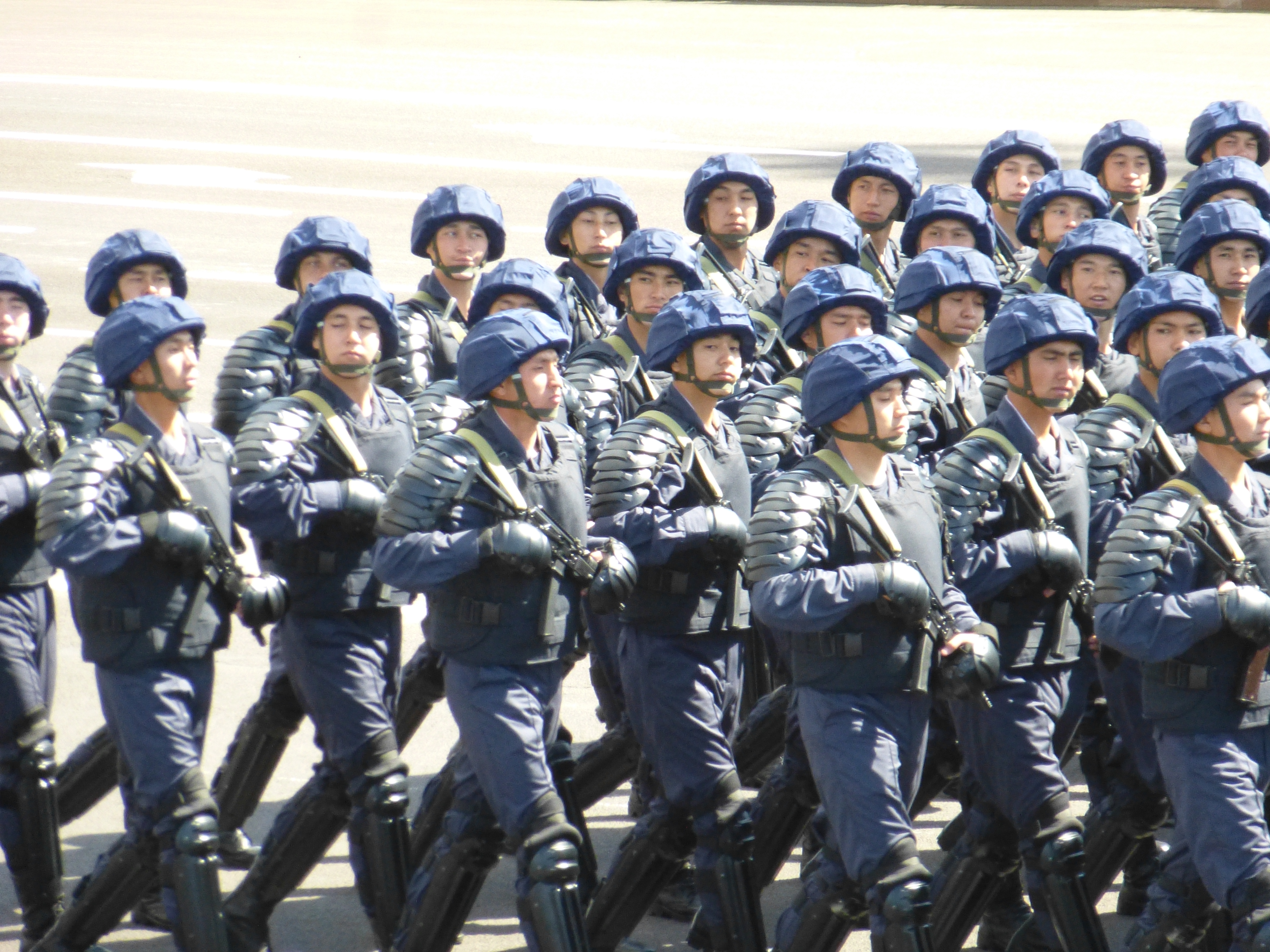

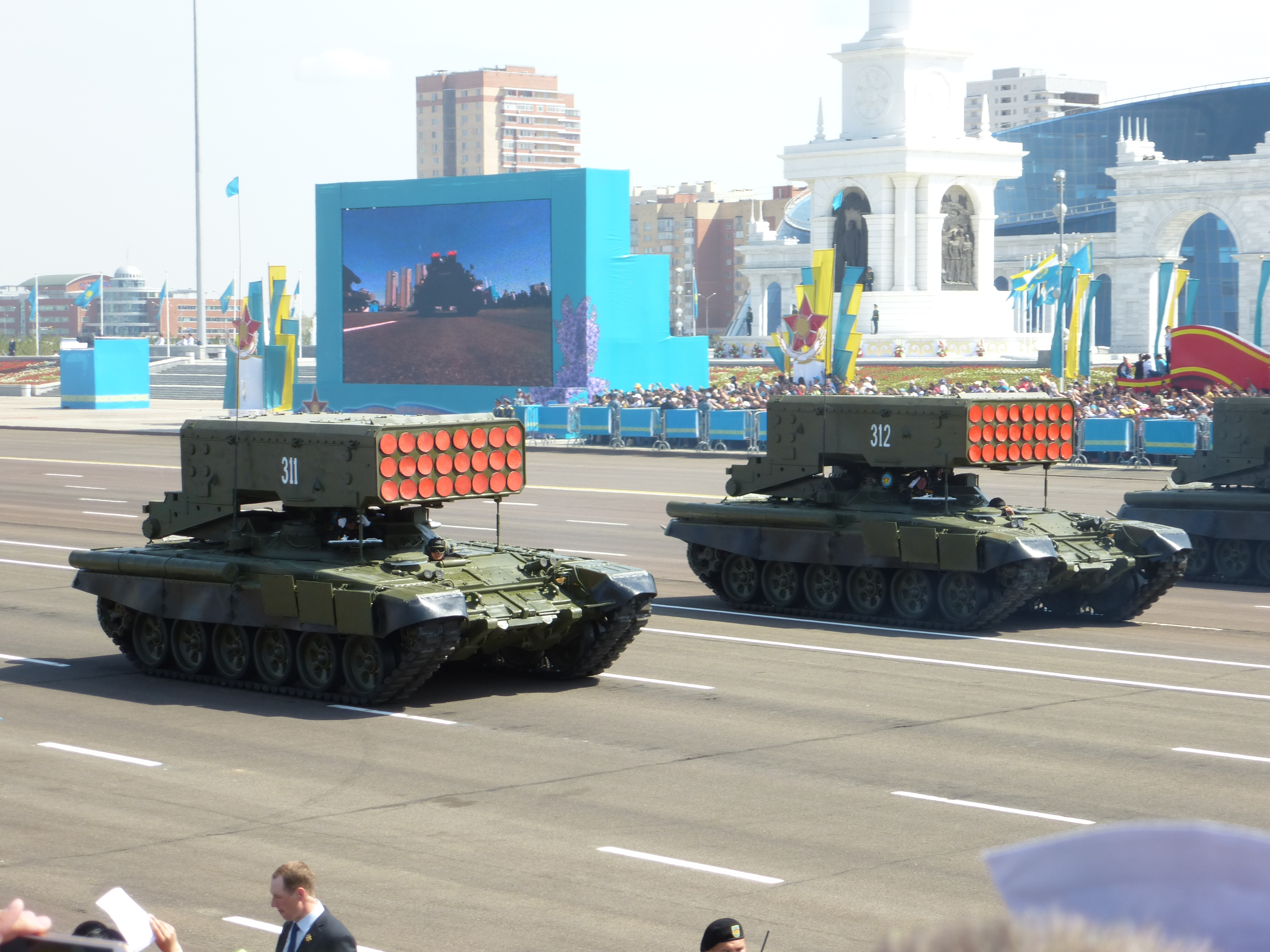

== See also ==
- Defender of the Fatherland Day
- Victory Day (9 May)
- Constitution Day (Kazakhstan)
- Kazakhstan Independence Day
- Armed Forces Day
- Navy Day
- Public holidays in Kazakhstan
