= Almas Ordabajev =

Kazakh architect (1938–2026)

Almas Baimukhanovich Ordabajev (Russian: Алма́с Баймуха́нович Ордаба́ев; 19 April 1938 – 13 June 2026) was a Kazakh architect.

== Life and work ==
Ordabajev was born on 19 April 1938 in Novosibirsk. In 1959 he graduated from the Faculty of Architecture of the Leningrad Engineering and Construction Institute. As an architect, he worked on a number of projects, including:

- Monument to the defenders of Cherkasy defense in Almaty.
- Monument to the victims of political repression in Astana.
- Monument of the Battle of Anrakai.

He died on 13 June 2026, aged 88.

== Awards ==
- 2013 – International Academy of Architecture diploma.
