= Yesen Taskynbayev =

Kazakh politician (1932–2026)

Esen Tasqynbaev
- Есен Тасқынбаев

Member of the Supreme Soviet of the Kazakh Soviet Socialist Republic
- In office 1971–1989

Personal details
- Born: Yesen Taskynbayevich Taskynbayev; 10 March 1932 Zhilokosinsky District, Kazakh ASSR, Russian SFSR, Soviet Union
- Died: 10 February 2026 (aged 93) Atyrau, Kazakhstan
- Party: CPSU
- Education: Gubkin Moscow Oil Institute
- Occupation: Oil refiner; politician

Esen Tasqynbaiūly Tasqynbaev (Note: Often transliterated as Yesen Taskynbayevich Taskynbayev through a Russified Romanization of Есен Таскынбаевич Таскынбаев.) (Kazakh: Есен Тасқынбайұлы Тасқынбаев; 10 March 1932 – 10 February 2026) was a Kazakh oil refiner and politician. A member of the Communist Party of the Soviet Union, he served in the Supreme Soviet of the Kazakh Soviet Socialist Republic from 1971 to 1989.

Taskynbayev died in Atyrau on 10 February 2026, at the age of 93.
