= Murat Bisenbin =

Kazakh actor (1972–2026)

Murat Bolatūly Bisembin (Kazakh: Мұрат Болатұлы Бисенбин; 1972 – 8 January 2026) was a Kazakh actor. He died from cancer on 8 January 2026, at the age of 53.
