= The ATOM Project =

The ATOM Project (est. August 2012) is an international campaign by the Nazarbayev Center of Kazakhstan. The primary goal of the campaign is to build international support for the abolishment of nuclear testing. ATOM stands for "Abolish Testing. Our Mission." The goal is to achieve in force the Comprehensive Nuclear-Test-Ban Treaty through online petitions and other methods.

== History and post-test experiments in Kazakhstan ==
The campaign is an initiative of the Nazarbayev Center whose mission includes the "promotion of nuclear responsibility, nuclear disarmament, and nuclear nonproliferation according to the vision of President Nursultan Nazarbayev (Kazakhstan)." Kazakhstan has historically been concerned about nuclear issues because of the Semipalatinsk Test Site, which is where the first Soviet nuclear weapon was exploded in 1949, with 456 more to follow (overall 90 air, 26 land, 354 underground) until 1989, it was the primary Soviet nuclear test site.

== Project promotion ==
In 2013, the ATOM Project began a world tour visiting Moscow, New York City, Washington, D.C., Vienna, Berlin, Madrid, and Tokyo. On September 4, 2013, the ATOM Project presented their project to the United Nations headquarters in New York City along the framework of International Day against Nuclear Testing. On September 11, they presented the project at the Carnegie Endowment for International Peace, Northern Virginia Community College, and the Embassy of Kazakhstan. The project visited Vienna on October 30 presenting to the Kazakhstan Student Society and the governing body of the Comprehensive Nuclear-Test-Ban Treaty.

On May 6, 2014, the five largest nuclear powers signed a guarantee not to use nuclear weapons in the territory of Central Asia. The powers: Britain, China, Russia, USA and France signed the 'Protocol to the Treaty on a Nuclear-Weapon-Free Zone in Central Asia' (Kazakhstan, Kyrgyzstan, Tajikistan, Turkmenistan and Uzbekistan).

2016 marks the 25th anniversary of the closure of Kazakhstan's Semipalatinsk Test Site, where the Soviet Union conducted extensive nuclear tests over four decades.

On August 29, 2016, Astana hosted plenary session of international conference "Building a Nuclear-Weapon-Free World." The keynote speakers included President Nazarbayev, Chairman of the Senate Kassym-Jomart Tokayev, and Executive Secretary of the Preparatory Commission of the CTBTO Lassina Zerbo. The main outcome of the conference was the adoption of the declaration "The Astana Vision: From a Radioactive Haze to a Nuclear-Weapon Free World." The conference was held to coincide with the 25th anniversary of the closure of the Semipalatinsk testing site.

== Honorary Ambassador Karipbek Kuyukov ==
The "Honorary Ambassador" for the campaign is the artist and painter Karipbek Kuyukov (b. 1968) who was born without arms and experienced many nuclear tests as a child. He became a renowned artist painting with his mouth and feet and an internationally recognised anti-nuclear weapons activist. In May 2016, he opened his first exhibition in Astana. Kuyukov and Kazakhstan President Nursultan Nazarbayev were nominated in 2017 for the Nobel Peace Prize.
