= Döñgelek Square =

Square in Astana, Kazakhstan

Coordinates: 51.1308°N 71.4145°E

Döñgelek Square Дөңгелек алаң
- Completed: 2003
- Location: Astana, Kazakhstan
- Interactive map of Döñgelek Square

Döñgelek Square (Circular Square) is a city square in Astana, Kazakhstan. It was created in 2003. The square is located in front of KazMunayGas headquarters and features many shops and restaurants. The square is built in two tiers. The lower one is designed for pedestrians, and the upper one is intended for vehicles. There are also fountains in the square.
