= Otan Qorgaushylar Monument =

City memorial in Astana, Kazakhstan

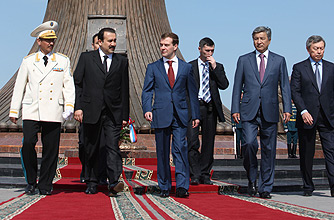
- Russian leader Dmitry Medvedev walking from the memorial.
- Interactive map of Otan Qorgaushylar Monument
- Type: Memorial
- Location: Astana, Kazakhstan
- Coordinates: 51°09′12″N 71°27′28″E
- Created: 2001
- Status: All year

Otan Korgaushilar Monument (Kazakh: «Отан қорғаушылар» монументі, romanized: «Otan qorğauşylar» monumentı; Russian: Памятник "Отан коргаушилар") is a city memorial in Astana, the capital of Kazakhstan. It is in Defenders of the Fatherland Square near Tauelsizdik Avenue. It primarily commemorates the Kazakhs who were sent to serve in the Soviet Army during the Great Patriotic War (World War II) as well as veterans of the Kazakh Armed Forces. In the Kazakh language, "Otan Korgaushilar" is the term used for "Defenders of the Fatherland". Dignitaries such as Alexander Lukashenko, Moon Jae-in, Angela Merkel, Sadyr Japarov and Kassym-Jomart Tokayev have in years past visited and laid wreaths at the memorial. Victory Day Parades commonly takes place at the memorial on 9 May.

The opening was on Victory Day in 2001. The foundation stone of the monument was laid on 10 June 1998 by the President of Kazakhstan, Nursultan Nazarbayev.

== Design ==
It elevated from the ground by a granite foundation, where a bronze stele is also situated. The memorial is 24 meters in height and is made of 63 tones of bronze. The central figure of the monument is a woman holding a golden cup, symbolizing peace and prosperity. Soviet soldiers are depicted on the right while on the left side, Kazakh batyrs are portrayed smashing people from the Dzungar tribes. There is an eternal flame burning at the foot of the monument. The flame was part of a burning flame at the Park of 28 Panfilov Guardsmen brought from Almaty. There is a park built around the monument. The ceneral contractor was the Gorkommunkhoz company, with the two commissioned architects being A. Beksultanov and N.Konopoltsev.
