= Kazakhstan People's Unity Day =

Public holiday of Kazakhstan

Unity Day
- Official name: Day of People's Unity
- Observed by: Kazakhstan
- Type: National
- Significance: A public holiday in Kazakhstan which celebrates the Kazakhs and the Kazakh nation alongside inter-ethnic relations between ethnic Kazakhs and all ethnicities living in Kazakhstan in peace and mutual respect embracing the diverse cultural and ethnic background of each Kazakhstani person.
- Celebrations: A concert with traditional dances and songs of different ethnicities, dressing up in their traditional clothing and bringing foods of their ethnic background
- Date: 1 May
- Next time: 1 May 2027
- Frequency: Annual
- First time: 1996
- Started by: Nursultan Nazarbayev

Kazakhstan People's Unity Day, (Note: Kazakh: Қазақстан халқының бірлігі күні; Qazaqstan halqynyñ bırlıgı künı; Russian: День единства народа Казахстана; Den' yedinstva naroda Kazakhstana) also known as Unity Day, is a Public holiday in Kazakhstan which celebrates the Kazakhs and the Kazakh nation alongside inter-ethnic relations between ethnic Kazakhs and all ethnicities living in Kazakhstan in peace and mutual respect embracing the diverse cultural and ethnic background of each Kazakhstani person. It is celebrated annually on May 1.

The holiday was first celebrated in 1996, due to the holiday being signed into law on 18 October 1995 by President Nursultan Nazarbayev, by which it also cancelled the Soviet era celebration of Labor Day.

Unity Day is a public holiday, so therefore most schools and businesses are closed for the day. The holiday emphasizes the importance of maintaining interethnic and inter-religious harmony, which is considered a priority of state policy.

Typically, it is celebrated by children dressing up in their traditional clothing and bringing foods of their ethnic background to school to introduce and share with their classmates as well as preparing performances in their mother tongue or traditional dances.

Almost every city in the country holds a concert in the main square with traditional dances and songs of different ethnicities living side by side in Kazakhstan promoting unity, respect, and embracing the diversity of the people of Kazakhstan. It is a holiday that Kazakhstani people are proud of and it is an important day to celebrate and instill in children respect for people of all ethnic backgrounds from early age.

In 2016, traditional parades were canceled in several cities due to protests over land reform that began in late April, and the authorities cited the weather conditions, the need to avoid disruption to public transport, as well as the celebration of other religious holidays.

Because of the COVID-19 pandemic and a national state of emergency in 2020, People's Unity Day was observed virtually. To avoid large crowds, traditional events like folk festivals and outdoor concerts were canceled. The Assembly of the People of Kazakhstan organized various online initiatives to mark the day, including Abai Qunanbaiuly's song "Kozymnin Karasy" on national instruments. The Assembly's regional branches launched online challenges, such as people filming themselves passing the national flag and saying, "My Homeland is Kazakhstan." Additionally, the Mayor’s office organized a live concert on YouTube featuring Kazakh pop stars, and the Kyzylorda region launched a media project highlighting the traditions and cuisine of various ethnic groups. The nation's accomplishments, according to President Kassym-Jomart Tokayev, were made possible by the "unity, friendship and solidarity of the representatives of all ethnic groups."

Similar commemorative days are observed in other countries, such as the Day of Interethnic Harmony and Cultural Diversity, established in 2024 to highlight unity and cultural diversity.
