= Capital City Day (Kazakhstan) =

The Akorda Residence, Astana

The Day of the Capital City of Kazakhstan or Astana Day (Kazakh: Астана күні, romanized: Astana künı) is an official public holiday in Kazakhstan. It was established in 2009 and is celebrated on July 6 to celebrate the capital city of Kazakhstan, Astana (formerly known as Nur-Sultan). The holiday also coincides with the birthday of ex-President Nursultan Nazarbayev.

== Background ==
On July 6, 1994, the President of Kazakhstan Nursultan Nazarbayev formally proposed the capital relocation to the Supreme Council of Kazakhstan. The president argued that while relocation costs would be significant, they represented an investment in the country’s future. The debate in parliament lasted all day, with opinions divided. Some deputies supported the president’s view, others argued that changing the capital was inappropriate during an economic crisis when people’s wages were delayed, and a third group supported the idea but suggested postponing it. In the end, the proposal to relocate the capital was put to a vote and passed by the Supreme Council on July 6, 1994, with a narrow majority.

On 6 May 1998, Akmola was renamed to Astana and gained status as the capital city. On 18 July 2008, the government approved a bill making Capital Day a state holiday.

== Celebrations ==
On Capital City Day in 2005, Jastar Park on Dóńgelek Square was unveiled.

The day will end with fireworks over Yessil River embankment, as well as a city park.

The 2020 celebrations coincided with the 80th birthday of Nursultan Nazarbayev. The celebratory events were held virtually due to the COVID-19 pandemic in the country.

== Music festivals ==
Since 2009, the most famous brass bands in the country and around the world perform at the Astana Samaly International Festival. A military tattoo known as the Eskeri Kernei ("Military Trumpet") International Festival is held on Capital City Day, held annually since 2012 under the auspices and support of the Nur-Sultan Mayor’s Office. It exists with the participation of military bands in the Military Band Service such as the Presidential Band of the State Security Service and foreign bands such as the Band of the Armed Forces of Mongolia and the Brass Band of the Government of Tuva.

== See also ==
- Public holidays in Kazakhstan
