= Constitution Day (Kazakhstan) =

Public holiday in Kazakhstan

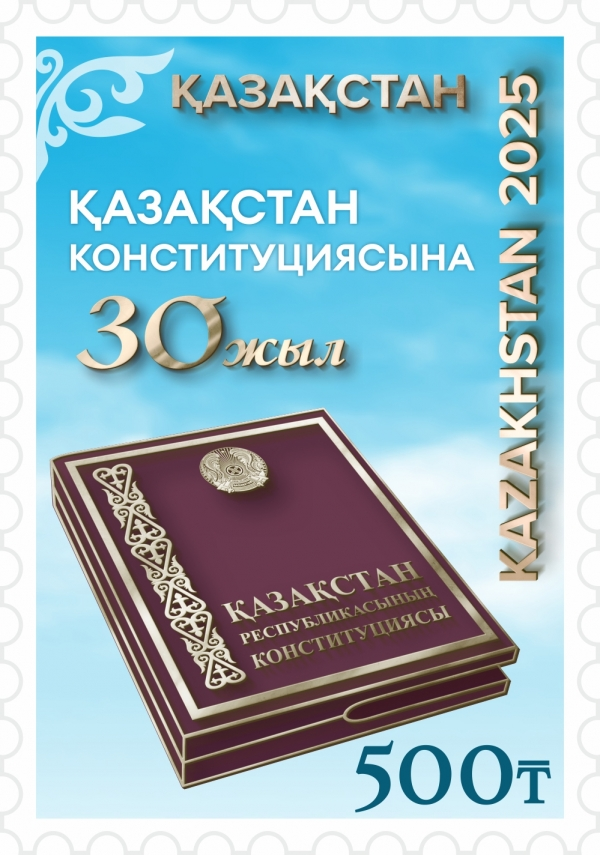
- 2025 Kazakh stamp dedicated to 30th anniversary of Constitution Day, depicting the 1995 Constitution
- Official name: Қазақстан Республикасының Конституция күні; День Конституции Республики Казахстан
- Observed by: Kazakhstan
- Type: National
- Significance: The anniversary of the 2026 Kazakh constitutional referendum on 15 March 2026
- Celebrations: Parades; fireworks; rallies
- Date: 15 March
- Next time: 15 March 2027
- Frequency: annual

Constitution Day of Kazakhstan (Note: Kazakh: Қазақстан Конституция күні; Qazaqstan Konstitutsiia künı; IPA: [qɑzɑqˈstɑn kən⁽ʲ⁾sʲtʲɪˈtut͡sɨjə kʏˈnɘ]; Russian: День Конституции Казахстана; Den' Konstitutsii Kazakhstana; IPA: [dʲenʲ kən⁽ʲ⁾sʲtʲɪˈtut͡sɨɪ kɐzɐxˈstanə]) is a national holiday in Kazakhstan that is celebrated annually on 15 March. It commemorates the 2026 Kazakh constitutional referendum, which adopted the current Constitution of Kazakhstan.

== Celebrations ==
There are traditionally mass festivities, concerts, parades, and fireworks on this day. The Supreme Court of Kazakhstan also conducted seminars in high schools around the country. In 2011, Kazakh pop stars such as Nagima Esqalieva, Janna Orynbasarova, as well as songs from The Beatles, and Almaty Symphony Orchestra performed for the holiday.

Before 2026, Constitution Day fell on 30 August, as a commemoration of the 1995 adoption of the Kazakh Constitution.

=== Holiday parade ===
The celebrations in 2009 in honor of the 14th anniversary of the Constitution of Kazakhstan were marked the first time that there was a military procession of the armed forces in Astana, the presiding officers of which were Adilbek Jaqsybekov and Major General Nurlan Jolamanov in their positions as Minister of Defense and Vice Minister of Defense respectively. Musical accompaniment for the parade were provided musicians of the Central Military Band of the Ministry of Defense of Kazakhstan, led by Colonel Alexander Belyakov. The ceremonial crews of the Ground Forces, the Air Defense Forces and the Naval Forces, as well as units of the Ministry of Internal Affairs, the National Security Committee, the Ministry of Emergency Situations and the Republican Guard passed through Kazakh Eli Square. In 2010, a parade was held again for the 15th anniversary of the Constitution of Kazakhstan, during which females took part in the parade for the first time. At the time, Kazakhstan was the only country to hold military parade on its Constitution Day. This tradition was honored for three years, until 2012, when it was abandoned.

== See also ==
- Public holidays in Kazakhstan
- Kazakhstan Independence Day
