= Republic Day (Kazakhstan) =

National holiday of Kazakhstan

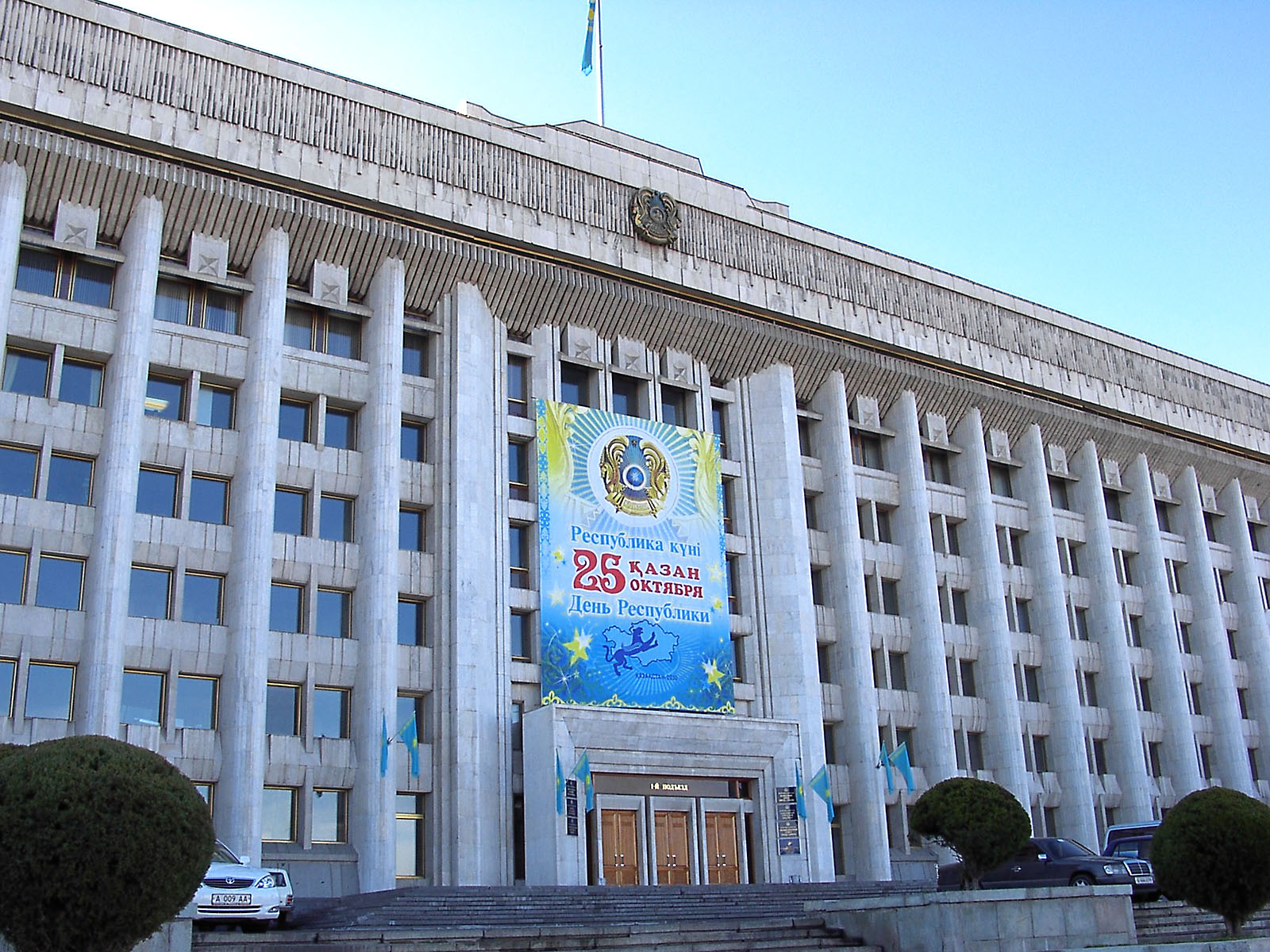
- Almaty City Hall during the 2014 Republic Day
- Observed by: Kazakhstan
- Type: National Day
- Celebrations: Kazakhstan's 1990 Declaration of Independence
- Date: 25 October
- Frequency: Annual

Republic Day (Kazakh: Республика күні, romanized: Respublika künı, Russian: День Республики, romanized: Den Respubliki), observed on October 25, is a Public holiday in Kazakhstan, celebrating the declaration of sovereignty of the Kazakh SSR from the Soviet Union. In the waning days of Soviet rule, individual republics of the Soviet Union sought greater autonomy. The Soviet Union agreed in early 1990 to give up its monopoly of political power. Following the lead of the Lithuanian SSR, the Russian SFSR and others, the Kazakh SSR declared its sovereignty on 25 October 1990, and Kazakhstan subsequently became independent on 16 December 1991 as the Soviet Union collapsed.
