= Independence Day (Kazakhstan) =

Holiday in Kazakhstan

- Emblem of Kazakhstan
- Official name: Independence Day of the Republic of Kazakhstan (Note: Kazakh: Қазақстан Республикасының Тәуелсіздік күні; Qazaqstan Respublikasynyñ Täuelsızdık künı; Russian: День Незасимости Республики Казахстан; Den' Nezavisimosti Respubliki Kazakhstan)
- Observed by: Kazakhstan
- Type: State
- Celebrations: Fireworks, concerts, parades
- Date: 16 December (or next working day)
- Frequency: Annual

The Independence Day of Kazakhstan (Note: Kazakh: Қазақстанның Тәуелсіздік күні; Qazaqstannyñ Täuelsızdık künı; pronounced [qɑzɑqstɑnˈnəŋ tæɥelsɘzˈdɘk kʉˈnɘ]; Russian: День Независимости Казахстана; Den' Nezavisimosti Kazakhstana) is celebrated annually on 16 December.

== Significance ==
In an attempt to keep unity within the Soviet Union, the country held a referendum on 16 March 1991; Kazakhstan voted 95% in favor of a new Union of Sovereign States. After the aborted coup d'état in August, the Supreme Soviet (Kazakhstan) passed the Constitutional Law "On the State Independence of the Republic of Kazakhstan" on 16 December 1991. Despite the swift collapse of the Soviet Union, Kazakhstan was the last to declare its independence. The declaration was followed up by the Alma-Ata Protocol which would give birth to the Commonwealth of Independent States. Independence ushered in the era under President Nursultan Nazarbayev, during which a new bicameral Parliament and a new capital was established. Notable events that followed as an indirect result of independence include:

- Kazakhstan became a member of the United Nations in March 1992
- Kazakhstan became a member of the International Monetary Fund in July 1992
- 1993 Constitution of Kazakhstan
- Kazakhstan became a member of the International Atomic Energy Agency in February 1994
- Project Sapphire operation which reduced the amount of nuclear material from Kazakhstan
- 1995 Constitution of Kazakhstan
- 2007 amendment to the Constitution of Kazakhstan
- Kazakhstan 2050 Strategy is introduced in 2012

== General celebrations ==
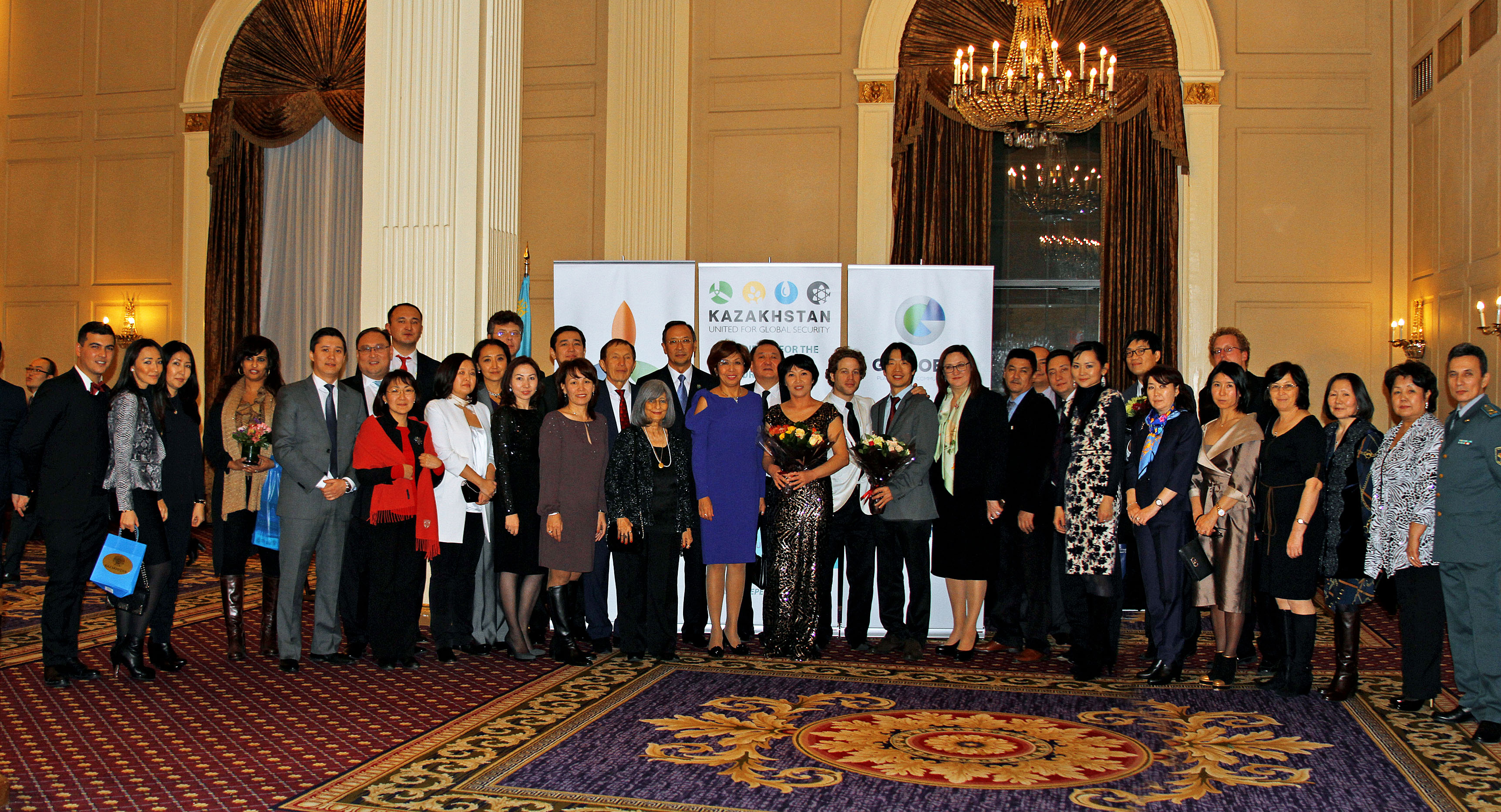
Independence Day celebrations in New York

The holiday is celebrated for 1 day on 16 December. If the 16 December falls on a weekend, the following Monday will be a holiday. Yurts (traditional tents) are set up in many villages where local delicacies will be served. It tends to be commemorated indoors due to the coinciding winter season. The Astana Opera organizes concerts involving national orchestras that will perform traditional music. Many nationalist politicians and activists use the holiday as an occasion to accuse to the Russian government of attempted genocide of the ethnic population during periods such as the Kazakh famine of 1932–33 and the population transfer of Kazakhs in the Soviet Union.

=== Jeltoqsan commemorations ===
Independence Day is also used as a day of remembrance of the 1986 Jeltoqsan protests, which was the starting point of discontent against Soviet rule, on Brezhnev Square (present-day Republic Square) against the government of Gennady Kolbin, which began on the same day as Independence Day. By the 1980s, democratization in the Soviet Union began to rise with the 1986 protests, which followed a major unrest in Central and Eastern Europe that began in Poland that spilled over into the individual republics.

=== Aqorda ceremony ===
A ceremony hosted by the President of Kazakhstan is held at the Aqorda Presidential Palace, in which the president presents orders, decorations, and medals of Kazakhstan to distinguished citizens. Many Kazakhs will dress up in traditional clothes at the formal ceremony in the presidential palace.

== Historical events ==
=== 1996 ===
The first independence day military parade of Kazakhstan was held on Almaty's Republic Square in 1996 timed to the occasion of the 5th anniversary of independence. Minister of Defense Mukhtar Altynbayev opened the parade, which also saw a cavalry squadron from the Republican Guard makes its debut appearance.

=== 2001 ===
To coincide with the 10th anniversary of Independence Day in 2001, commemorative medals and coins were issued as well as festive train tour named Менің Қазақстаным ("My Kazakhstan") was launched from May of that year and travelled around the country until December, stopping in places to hold events and concerts with local residents including in remote villages. The passengers on the train included famous artists, filmmakers, writers and journalists, doctors and officials, lawyers and librarians as well. In late August, Kazakh border guards held a relay race along the nation's boundaries from outpost to outpost where a miniature copy of the Golden Warrior Monument was passed.

At a solemn meeting held on 16 December 2001 in Astana, President Nursultan Nazarbayev presented a speech titled "Ten years equal to a century", where he emphasised the positive results that Kazakhstan has made for the decade since its independence.

=== 2011 ===
On 27 January 2011, President Nursultan Nazarbayev signed a decree, declaring the year as the 20th anniversary of Independence Day that would be held under the motto of "20 years of peace and creation" as well as the formation of a state commission that would carry out the celebration.

On 16 December, a constitutional act "On State Independence of the Republic of Kazakhstan" was adopted, which declared that the 20th anniversary celebrations took place amidst as a successful state with "a democratic, political and legal system, a stable economy and a high level of wellbeing of the population" as a "century-old dream" by ancestors that was fulfilled by Nazarbayev. That same day as various celebrations were held across the country, unrest broke out in town of Zhanaozen where striking oil workers disrupted a concert event held at the main square, resulting in clashes between the workers and police that led to several deaths as the unarmed protestors were gunned down, becoming one of Kazakhstan's most bloodiest event since its independence.

=== 2016 ===
Israeli prime minister Benjamin Netanyahu visited in 2016 to attend the 25th anniversary celebrations.

=== 2021 ===
For the 30th anniversary in 2021, a commission under the Ministry of Information and Social Development to prepare for the anniversary was established in October 2019. President Kassym-Jomart Tokayev announced that an amnesty will be held for those brought to criminal responsibility. In January 2021, Tokayev proposed that during the celebrations, a short history of Kazakhstan should be written for a foreign audience (translated in to the languages of the world) as means of "not succumbing to the influence of alien ideology".

== Foreign celebrations ==
On the first anniversary in 1992, an orchestra of folk instruments from Semipalatinsk took part in a ceremony hosted by the Kazakh embassy in the Tchaikovsky Concert Hall in Moscow. Many celebrations in the United States are held by the diaspora in the state of New York as well as the Kazakh embassy in Washington, D.C.

== See also ==
- Public holidays in Kazakhstan
- Independence Day (Tajikistan)
- Independence Day (Kyrgyzstan)
- Independence Day (Uzbekistan)
- Independence Day (Turkmenistan)
