= Armed Forces of the Republic of Kazakhstan =

Combined military forces of Kazakhstan

- Қазақстан Республикасының Қарулы Күштері (Kazakh); Вооруженные силы Республики Казахстан (Russian)
- Emblem of the Kazakh Armed Forces

- Flag of the Kazakhstan Armed Forces
- Motto: «Бір Тұтас Ел — Бір Тұтас Жер» ('One United Nation — One United Land')
- Founded: 7 May 1992; 34 years ago
- Service branches: Ground Forces; Air Defense Forces; Naval Forces; Air Assault Forces; Special Operations Forces
- Headquarters: Ministry of Defence Building, Dostyk Street, Astana

Leadership
- Commander-in-chief: Kassym-Jomart Tokayev
- Minister of Defense: Major General Aidos Myrzakhmetov
- Chief of the General Staff: Major General of the State Security Service Aitkurman Omarbekov

Personnel
- Military age: 18–27
- Conscription: 1 year
- Active personnel: 110,000 (2025)
- Reserve personnel: 135,000 (2025)

Expenditure
- Budget: US$5.58 billion (2026)"Budget 2026: Government reallocates 1.4 trillion tenge to priority development areas". Prime Minister of Kazakhstan. 22 October 2025.
- Percent of GDP: 3.0% (2024 est.)

Industry
- Domestic suppliers: JSC National Company Kazakhstan Engineering
- Foreign suppliers: Australia; Canada; China; European Union; France; Germany; Russia; Israel; Japan; South Korea; Turkey; United Kingdom; Ukraine; United States

Related articles
- History: Civil war in Tajikistan; Iraq War; 2022 Kazakh unrest
- Ranks: Military ranks of Kazakhstan

The Armed Forces of the Republic of Kazakhstan (Kazakh: Қазақстан Республикасының Қарулы Күштері, Qazaqstan Respublikasynyñ Qaruly Küşterı; Russian: Вооружённые силы Республики Казахстан) are the unified armed forces of Kazakhstan. They consist of three branches (Ground Forces, Air Defense Forces, Naval Forces) as well as four independent formations (Air Assault Forces, Special Forces, Rocket and Artillery Forces, and Territorial Troops). The National Guard, Civil Defense, Border Service and the State Security Service serve as militarized affiliates of the armed forces. The national defence policy aims are based on the Constitution of Kazakhstan. They guarantee the preservation of the independence and sovereignty of the state and the integrity of its land area, territorial waters and airspace and its constitutional order. The armed forces of Kazakhstan act under the authority of the Kazakhstan Ministry of Defence.

== General composition ==
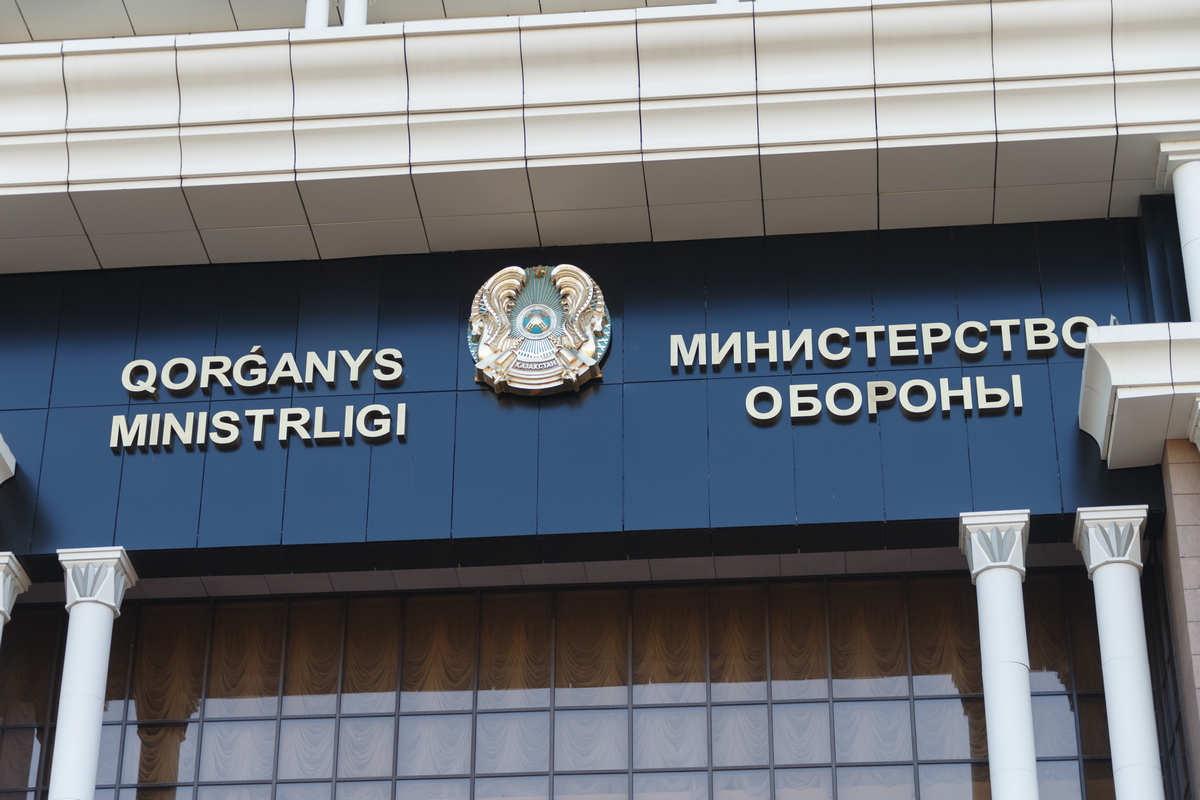
The facade of the defence ministry

The branches and subordinate bodies of the armed forces include:

- Ministry of Defence
- Branches
  - Ground Forces
    - Special Forces
    - Rocket and Artillery Forces
  - Air Defence Forces
  - Naval Forces
  - Air Assault Forces
  - Special Operations Forces
- Upon the announcement of mobilisation, the Armed Forces of the Republic of Kazakhstan shall include:
  - National Guard
  - Civil Defence of EMERCOM
  - Border Service of the National Security Committee
  - State Security Service
  - Territorial Troops

=== Manpower ===
The Military Balance 2013 reported the armed forces' strength as: Army, 20,000; Navy, 3,000; Air Force, 12,000; and MoD, 4,000. It also reported 31,000 paramilitary personnel.

=== General Staff ===
The General Staff is the main body for the management of the armed forces of the state in peacetime and wartime. It coordinates the development of plans for the construction and development of the Armed Forces, other troops, and military formations, as well as their operational, combat, and mobilisation training. It organises and carries out strategic planning for the deployment and interaction of the Armed Forces, other troops, and military formations, and also develops a plan for the operational equipment of the country's territory for defence.

==== Units ====
- Troops of Radiation, Chemical, and Biological Protection
- Department of Engineering Troops

== History ==
On May 7, 1992, following the dissolution of the Soviet Union, the president of Kazakhstan took a number of actions regarding defence. He signed a decree on the 'establishment of the Armed Forces of the Republic of Kazakhstan', the transformation of the State Committee of Defence of the Republic of Kazakhstan into the Ministry of Defence, on the attribution of Sagadat Nurmagambetov the military rank of Colonel General, and the appointment of General-Colonel Sagadat Nurmagambetov as Defence Minister of Kazakhstan. Mukhtar Altynbayev served as the Minister of Defence twice, most recently from December 2001 to 10 January 2007.

On June 30, 1992, the Soviet Armed Forces' Turkestan Military District disbanded, following the collapse of the Soviet Union. The most powerful grouping of forces from the Turkestan Military District then became the core of Kazakhstan's new military. Kazakhstan acquired all the units of the 40th Army (the former 32nd Army) and part of the 17th Army Corps, including 6 land force divisions, storage bases, the 14th and 35th air-landing brigades, 2 rocket brigades, 2 artillery regiments and a large amount of equipment which had been withdrawn from over the Urals after the signing of the Treaty on Conventional Armed Forces in Europe.

On July 6, 2000, a presidential decree returned the armed forces returned to a dual structure (general-purpose forces and air defense forces). The Airmobile Forces were also created, and it transitioned to a new military-territorial structure of established military districts. In February 2001, a decree divided the functions of the Ministry of Defence and General Staff. From 2000 to 2003, the transition of the Armed Forces to the brigade structure of troops was fully implemented.

Kazakhstan had its first military parade in its history at Otar Military Base on May 7, 2013, celebrating the Defender of the Fatherland Day as the national holiday for the first time ever. During the ceremony, the first woman was promoted to the rank of General. Kazakhstan is a founding member of CSTO and SCO. Kazakhstan also has an Individual Partnership Action Plan with NATO & strategic cooperation with the Turkish Armed Forces.

=== Deployments ===
==== Peacekeeping in Tajikistan ====
During the civil war in Tajikistan, in accordance with the decision of the CIS countries, peacekeepers were sent to Tajikistan. The participants were Russia, Kazakhstan, Uzbekistan and Kyrgyzstan. At the initial stage, on September 10, 1992, one 300 man airborne assault battalion from the 35th Guards Air Assault Brigade was sent to Tajikistan. Later, in the spring of 1993, a consolidated battalion of three rifle companies was formed from three agencies: the Ministry of Defense, the Interior Ministry, and the Border Troops of the KNB. The combat task of the Kazakh military during the civil war in Tajikistan was to strengthen the checkpoints and outposts of the Russian border detachment in Kalai-Khumb. On April 7, 1995, in the Pshikhavr Gorge of the Pamirs, a company was ambushed, during which 17 people were killed, 33 were injured. Over the entire period of peacekeeping missions in Tajikistan, during the hostilities, the combined Kazakh battalion lost 54 soldiers killed and missing. The mission formally ended in 2000, and the peacekeepers left in 2001.

==== UN Peacekeeping ====
Kazakhstan has one of the most extensive peacekeeping operations in the Commonwealth of Independent States. The KAZBAT is the main Kazakh peacekeeping military unit, falling under the 38th Air Assault Brigade (KAZBRIG) of the Airmobile Forces. It was formed on 31 January 2000 by decree of President Nursultan Nazarbayev. They are trained in accordance with NATO and United Nations standards and are therefore authorized to wear blue helmets while on duty and during parades.

==== Covid-19 ====
When the COVID-19 pandemic in Kazakhstan broke out, volunteer military personnel were called to serve to combat the virus. The volunteers were stationed at checkpoints and city facilities, and patrolled the streets to enforce lockdowns.

== Budget ==
In 2012, a quarter of the budget allocated for the MoD was allocated for modernization, restoration, overhaul and the acquisition of weapons. From 2012 to 2014, defense spending amounted to 12 billion tenge.

== Branches ==
=== Ground Forces ===
Regional Commands of Kazakhstan

The 32nd Army had been serving in Kazakhstan for many years. The 32nd Army had been redesignated initially the 1st Army Corps (1988), then the 40th Army (June 1991). It came under Kazakh control in May 1992. On November 1, 1992, on the basis of units of the former Soviet 40th Army of the Turkestan Military District, the First Army Corps was created, with its headquarters in Semipalatinsk. Later, at its base was established the Eastern Military District, retitled on 13 November 2003 as Regional Command East.

Today the Ground Forces include four regional commands:

- Regional Command "Astana" (Headquarters Karaganda)
- Regional Command "East" (Headquarters Semipalatinsk)
- Regional Command "West" (Headquarters Atyrau)
- Regional Command "South" (Headquarters Taraz)

There are also the Airmobile Forces with four brigades, and the Artillery and Missile Forces (formed as a separate branch on 7 May 2003).

=== Air and air defence forces ===
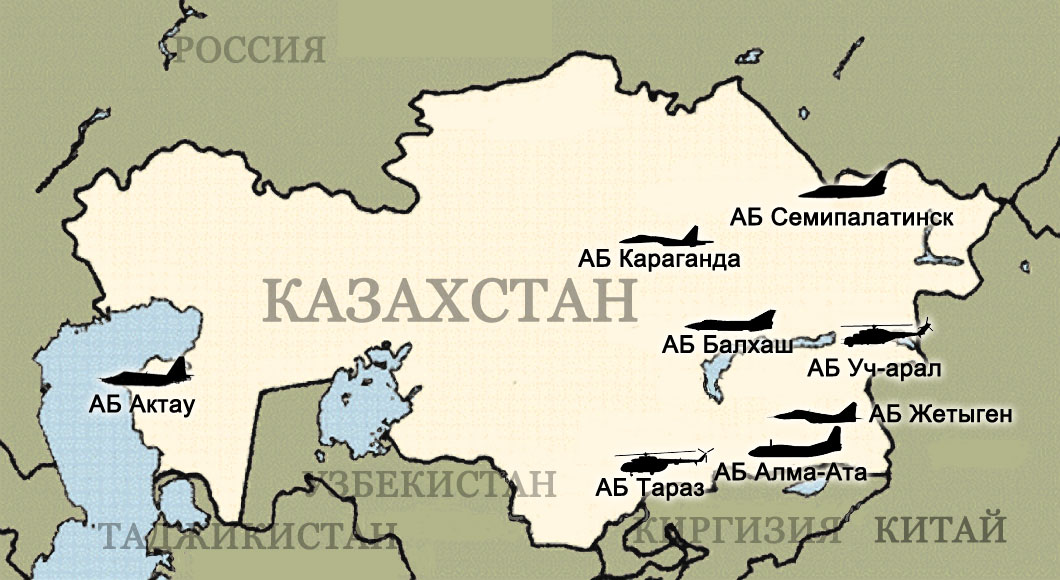
Air Force bases of Kazakhstan

At the time of the dissolution of the Soviet Union, the 24th Fighter-Bomber Aviation Division with three aviation regiments and three separate regiments was stationed in Kazakhstan. By late 1993 the Kazakhstan Air Force comprised a total of six regiments, with a further air defence fighter regiment. The 11th Division included the 129th Fighter-Bomber Regiment based at Taldy Kurgan, with MiG-27 'Flogger' aircraft and the 134th Fighter-Bomber Regiment at Zhangiz-tobe with MiG-27s. There was also the 149th Bomber Regiment at Zhetigen/Nikolayevka, with Sukhoi Su-24 'Fencers'. Independent elements comprised the 715th Fighter Regiment at Lugovaya, with MiG-29s and MiG-23 'Floggers'; the 39th Reconnaissance Regiment at Balkhash, with MiG-25RBs and Su-24MR "Fencer" aircraft, and the 486th Helicopter Regiment based at Ucharal with Mi-24 'Hind'. The sole air defence fighter aviation regiment was the 356th Fighter Aviation Regiment at Semipalatinsk with Mikoyan MiG-31 "Foxhound" air defence fighters, which had been part of the 56th Air Defence Corps of the 14th Independent Air Defence Army. The Air Force was under the command of Major General Aliy Petrovich Volkov.

Today the Kazakh Air and Air Defence Force has four fast jet bases:

- 600th Guards Air Base, Zhetigen, Nikolayevka, Almaty, with MiG-29,
- 602nd Air Base, Shymkent, with MiG-29,
- 604th Air Base, Taldykorgan Airport, with MiG-27 and Su-27 (previously the 129th Fighter-Bomber Regiment)
- 610th Air Base, Sary-Arka Airport, Karaganda, with MiG-31.

On 28 October 2010, two strategic agreements signed today establish the framework for Eurocopter's creation of a 50/50 joint venture with Kazakhstan Engineering Kazakhstan to assemble EC145 helicopters, along with the sale of 45 of these locally assembled aircraft for government missions in the country. On 28 November 2011, Eurocopter delivered the first of six EC145s ordered to date by the Kazakh Ministries of Defence and Emergencies. Deliveries are to continue through 2017.

On 3 January 2012, Airbus Military signed a firm contract with Kazspetsexport, a state company belonging to the Ministry of Defence of Kazakhstan, to supply two EADS CASA C-295 military transport aircraft plus the related service support package for spare parts and ground support equipment. Additionally, a memorandum of understanding has been signed for a further six C295 aircraft, for which separate firm contracts will be signed progressively over the next few years. The first two aircraft will be delivered by April 2013 and for the remaining six aircraft a delivery schedule will be defined over the following years. This purchase likely represents a quid pro quo. In 2008, EADS made titanium sourcing agreements with Kazakh suppliers.

In May 2012, Kazakhstan signed a letter of intent to acquire 20 Eurocopter EC725 helicopters. They were to be assembled in Astana by Kazakhstan Engineering. These Eurocoptors will be fitted with modern systems made by the Turkish firm Aselsan.

=== Naval Forces ===
Kazakhstan's Naval Forces were established by presidential decree on 7 May 2003 in spite of being the largest landlocked country on earth. They operate on the Caspian Sea, based at Aktau. The Kazakh Naval Force has a strength of 3,000 personnel and is equipped with fourteen inshore patrol craft.

== Personnel ==
=== Educational institutions ===
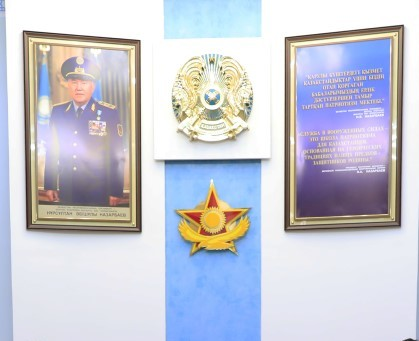
A hall in the National Defense University featuring national symbols as well as a photo of its patron, Nursultan Nazarbayev, in full dress uniform.

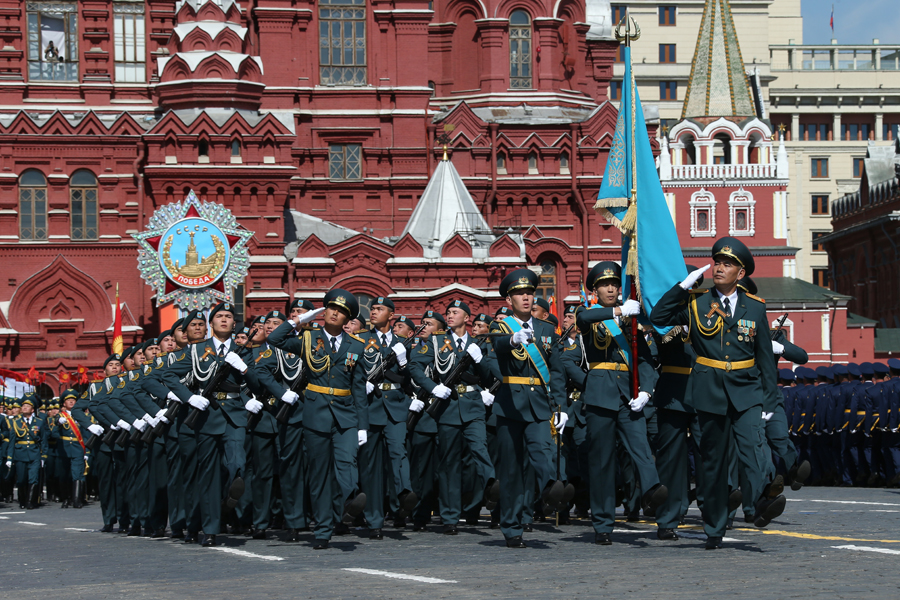
Cadets of the Military Institute of the Kazakh Ground Forces march in the 2015 Moscow Victory Day Parade

The following higher educational institutions are the main military academies in Kazakhstan:

- National Defense University
- Talgat Bigeldinov Military Institute of the Air Defence Forces
- Military Institute of the Kazakh Ground Forces
- Military Engineering Institute of Radio Electronics and Communications

Other militarized educational institutions:

- The Academy of the Border Service of the National Security Committee was founded on December 26, 1931, and was renamed April 1938 to the school Kharkiv Military School of the Border and Internal Troops of the NKVD. On April 2, 1957, the institution was transferred from the authority of the Interior Ministry to the KGB. In July 1960, the school was transformed into a four-year school which would be known as the Alma-Ata Higher Frontier Command School. In 1993, at the base of the newly formed border troops, the Military Institute of the National Security Committee of Kazakhstan was established and introduced a higher legal education program for graduates, which would continue until 1997. The next 20 years would be marred with name changes until it was given its current name in March 2012.

Secondary schools:

- Cadet Corps
- Zhas Ulan ("Young Guard") Republican Schools - There are currently four secondary schools that take the name of "Zhas Ulan Republican School". The Astana branch was the first to be founded, being established on 4 November 1999 in the presence of President Nazarbayev and Belarusian president Alexander Lukashenko. A four schools have educated about 1700 students in the 10–11 grades.
  - Astana Zhas Ulan Republican School
  - Almaty Zhas Ulan Republican School
  - Shymkent Zhas Ulan Republican School
  - Karaganda Zhas Ulan Republican School
- Republican Military Boarding School
  - Semey Republican Military Boarding School
  - Pavlodar Republican Military Boarding School
  - Aktobe Republican Military Boarding School

=== Women in the military ===
There are approximately 8,000-8,500 women serving in the Kazakh army. Of those women, 750 are officers. The Ministry of Defence has been working to promote women in the military through educational programs and career advancement opportunities. Only 2.1% of leadership positions within the Ministry of Defence are held by women. The Ministry of Defence also hosts Batyr Arular, which is a nationwide competition for service men and women, showcasing their combat skills, combat readiness and overall physical ability. Batyr Arular gives awards for the best service women.

=== Conscription ===
Every year, all men aged 18 to 27 are called up for military service in Kazakhstan. There are a number of circumstances due to which one can be released from military service both on a temporary and permanent basis.

== Symbols ==
Emblem of the Armed Forces

Armed Forces Flag

Beret insignia

== See also ==
- Birlestik-2024
- List of equipment of the Armed Forces of the Republic of Kazakhstan
