= Commander-in-Chief of the Air Defense Forces (Kazakhstan) =

Commander of Air and Air Defence Forces
- Incumbent; Kairat Sadykov since 18 June 2025
- Ministry of Defence
- Reports to: Chief of the General Staff
- Seat: Astana

The Commander-in-Chief of the Air Defense Forces is the administrative head in the Kazakh Air Defense Forces, and is under the chief of the General Staff and the Ministry of Defence. The current commander-in-chief of the Air Defense Forces is Kairat Sadykov.

== List of commanders ==
Name	Term start	Term end	Notes
Kopen Akhmadiev	17 September 2003	17 September 2007	
Alexander Sorokin	17 September 2007	27 June 2013	
Nurlan Ormanbetov	27 June 2013	2 October 2017	
Nurlan Karbenov	2 October 2017	16 March 2020	
Nurlan Ormanbetov	16 March 2020	29 December 2022	
Däuren Qosanov	29 December 2022	8 June 2025	
Kairat Sadykov	18 June 2025	Incumbent	
