= Nurlan Ormanbetov =

Kazakh Air Defense Forces commander-in-chief

- Born: 12 January 1962 (age 64); Zaysan, Soviet Union
- Alma mater: Military Academy of the General Staff of the Armed Forces of the Russian Federation
- Military career
- Allegiance: Kazakhstan
- Branch: Kazakh Air Defense Forces
- Service years: 1983–present
- Rank: Lieutenant general
- Commands: Commander-in-Chief Kazakh Air Defense Forces; Deputy Chief of the Joint Staff, Collective Security Treaty Organization
- Awards: Order "For Service to the Homeland in the Armed Forces of the USSR"; Medal of the Order "For Merit to the Fatherland"

Nurlan Sekenovich Ormanbetov (born 12 January 1962) is a lieutenant general in the Armed Forces of the Republic of Kazakhstan and the current commander-in-chief of the Kazakh Air Defense Forces. This is his second term as commander-in-chief: he initially served in that position from 2013 to 2017 and was reappointed for a second term on 16 March 2020. He also served as a deputy Chief of the Joint Staff (CJS) in intergovernmental military organization, the Collective Security Treaty Organization in February 2018.

== Biography ==
Ormanbetov was born in Zaysan, East Kazakhstan Region. He obtained his graduation from the Kharkov Higher Military Aviation School of Pilots in 1983 and Gagarin Air Force Academy in 1996. He is also a graduate of the Military Academy of the General Staff of the Armed Forces of the Russian Federation.

=== Career ===
After graduating from Kharkov Higher Military Aviation School of Pilots in 1983, he was enlisted in the Kazakh Air Defense Forces as a pilot and later flight commander of an aviation regiment until 1987. He was later transferred to Poland where he served in the Northern Group of Forces as a commander of an air regiment and deputy squadron commander at the military unit #21751 until he joined Order of the Red Banner Kutuzov Academy in 1993. In the same year he became deputy commander of the military unit #65229 for flight training and then unit #65229 in 1996, and unit #21751 in 2000. Two years later in 2002, he became commander of the air force base unit #21751.

In 2007 Ormanbetov became deputy commander-in-chief of the Kazakh Air Defense Forces, and in 2010 first deputy commander-in-chief. In 2012 he was appointed as head of the Main Directorate for Combat and Physical Training of the Air Defense Forces, and in 2017 deputy chief of the general staff in the Kazakh Armed Forces.

== Awards ==
- Order of Courage
- Military Merit Medal
- Order "For Service to the Homeland in the Armed Forces of the USSR" – III degree
- Medal of the Order "For Merit to the Fatherland" – II degree
