= QQK =

QQK may refer to:

- A reserved Q code for maritime use
- London King's Cross railway station (IATA railway code)
- Armed Forces of the Republic of Kazakhstan (Qazaqstannyñ Qarūly küshteri)
