= Talgat Bigeldinov =

Kazakh Soviet Air Forces major general (1922–2014)

- Талғат Жақыпбекұлы Бигелдинов
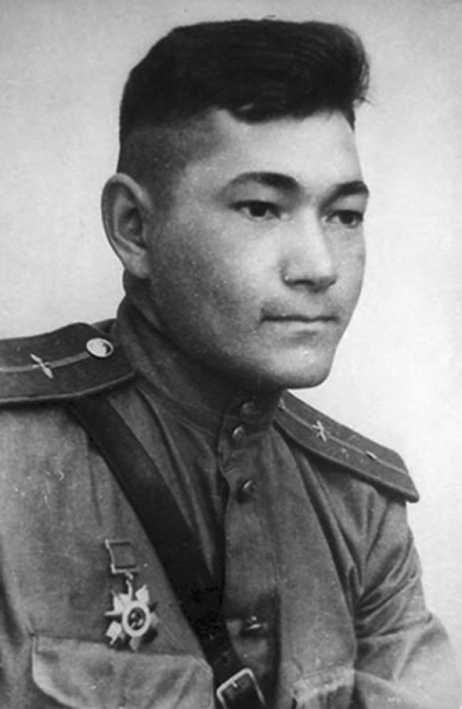
- Born: 5 August 1922; Maibalyq, Kazakh ASSR, RSFSR
- Died: 10 November 2014 (aged 92); Almaty, Kazakhstan
- Military career
- Allegiance: Soviet Union
- Branch: Soviet Air Force
- Service years: 1940–1956
- Rank: Major General
- Unit: 144th Guards Ground Attack Aviation Regiment
- Conflicts: World War II
- Awards: Hero of the Soviet Union (twice)

Talgat Jakypbekuly Bigeldinov (Kazakh: Талғат Жақыпбекұлы Бигелдинов, romanized: Talğat Jaqypbekūly Bigeldinov, Russian: Талгат Якубекович Бегельдинов) was a ground-attack pilot during the Second World War and the only Kazakh who was twice awarded the title Hero of the Soviet Union. He remained in the military after the war and reached the rank of lieutenant colonel before he transferred to the reserve. After Kazakhstan became independent from the Soviet Union he was promoted to the rank of Major-General.

== Early life ==
Bigeldinov was born on 5 August 1922 to a Kazakh peasant family in the village of Maybalyk in the Akmola Region, at the time within the Kazakh ASSR of the Russian SFSR. He grew up in the city of Frunze, and after graduating from the local aeroclub in 1939 and completing his tenth grade of secondary education in 1940 he entered the Soviet Military in April that year. In September 1940 he entered the Balashov Military Aviation School of Pilots, and in the summer of 1942 he graduated from the Chkalov Military Aviation School based Orenburg. From August 1942 to January 1943 he was a sergeant in the 34th Reserve Aviation Regiment. He became a member of the Communist Party in 1943.

== World War II ==
Bigeldinov was sent to the warfront of the Second World War in January 1943 to serve in the 800th Attack Aviation Regiment. While initially a sergeant, he became a junior lieutenant in May 1943 and by 1945 he was a captain and squadron commander. Upon arrival to the regiment, he soon began flying combat missions in the Il-2 on the Kalinin front, and on 6 May 1943 his plane was shot down by enemy fire; his left leg and left shoulder were injured during the incident. After he and his gunner P.V.Yakovlenko parachuted out of the stricken plane, they landed in enemy territory. While trying to make their way to Soviet territory they were forced to swim across the Severky Donets river; Yakovlenko died while swimming across the river but Bigeldinov survived and was sent to a hospital before he returned to his regiment. In February 1944, his regiment was honored with the Guards designation and renamed the 144th Guards Attack Aviation Regiment. On 6 June 1943, he personally destroyed one Bf 110 and 2 Bf 110 on the ground during a mission attacking an airfield in Kharkov. He flew in the battle for the Dnieper as a flight commander in the squadron under the command of Captain S.D.Poshivalnikov. On one flight he managed to suppress incoming fire from a high-caliber anti-aircraft battery before he bombed an enemy crossing on the river with a high degree of precision.

For completing 155 ground attack missions flying an Il-2, he was nominated for the title Hero of the Soviet Union on 27 June 1944. He received the title on 26 October that year. On 15 March 1945 he was nominated for a second gold star for having flown 275 missions, which he received after the war on 27 June. By the end of the war he had flown 305 sorties on the Il-2; in addition to attacking ground targets on those missions he had personally shot down four Bf 109, one Ju 87, and gained two group aerial victories.

== Postwar ==
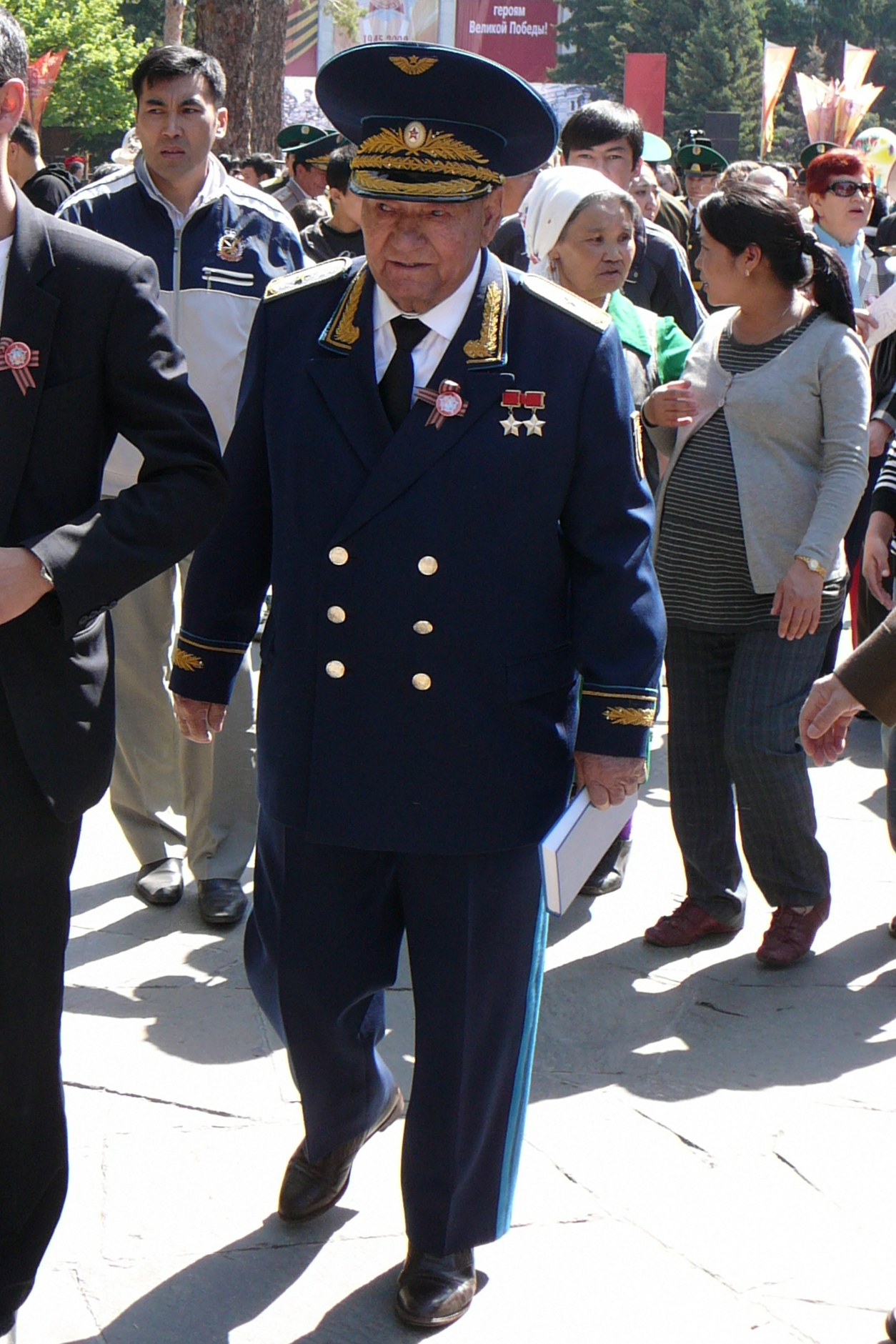
Bigeldinov in Almaty on Victory Day in 2009.

After the war, Bigeldinov remained in the military until August 1956. In 1950 he graduated from the Air Force Academy in Monino, after which he served as the deputy commander of an assault aviation regiment in the Kiev area. In 1953 he was promoted to the rank of lieutenant colonel, and starting in March 1956 he taught at a military aviation school in Krasnodar. From 1957 to 1968 he served as the deputy chairman of the Civil Aviation Department of the Kazakh SSR. From 1968 to 1971 he was the head of the construction department at the a shipyard in Feodosia, Crimea. From 1971 to 1974 he worked as the deputy manager of the Kazstalmontazh project, and from 1974 to 1976 he was the assistant to the chairman of the State Construction Committee of the Kazakh SSR. From 1979 to 1984 he was the chairman of the Board of Motorists of the Kazakh SSR. In 1984 he became the director of the House of Creativity of the Kazakh SSR branch of the Literary Fund of the Soviet Union, but he left the position in 1985 to become a director at the United Driving School and a consultant to the Union of Drivers of the Kazakh SSR. He was also a deputy in the Supreme Soviet from 1946 to 1954. He died of a heart attack in the city of Almaty in 2014 and was buried in Kensayskom cemetery.

== Legacy ==
After the dissolution of the Soviet Union, he was made a Major-General of the Air Force of Kazakhstan in 1992. His name was given to the Military Institute of Air Defense Forces and the Karaganda Zhas Ulan Republican School. Talgat Begeldinov Memorial Day on 5 August is an annual holiday in Kazakhstan.

== Awards and honors ==
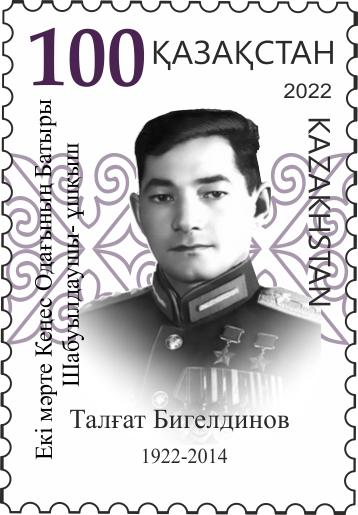
Kazakhstan postage stamp featuring Bigeldinov

=== Soviet Union ===
- Twice Hero of the Soviet Union (26 October 1944 and 27 June 1945)
- Order of Lenin (26 October 1944)
- Two Order of the Red Banner (1 September 1943 and 2 October 1944)
- Order of Aleksandr Nevsky (17 August 1944)
- Order of the Patriotic War (2nd class - 8 April 1943; 1st class - 27 January 1944 and 11 March 1985)
- Order of the Red Star (30 December 1956)
- Order of Glory 3rd class (28 December 1943)
- campaign and service medals

=== Kazakhstan ===
- Order of Otan
- Order of Glory
- Medal "10 years of Astana"

=== Other states ===
- Cross of Valour - Poland
- Order of Merit 3rd class - Ukraine

== See also ==
- Nurken Abdirov
- Khiuaz Dospanova
- Jaqipbek Maldybayev
