= Däuren Qosanov =

Kazakh military officer

Lieutenant general Däuren Qosanov
- Дәурен Қосанов
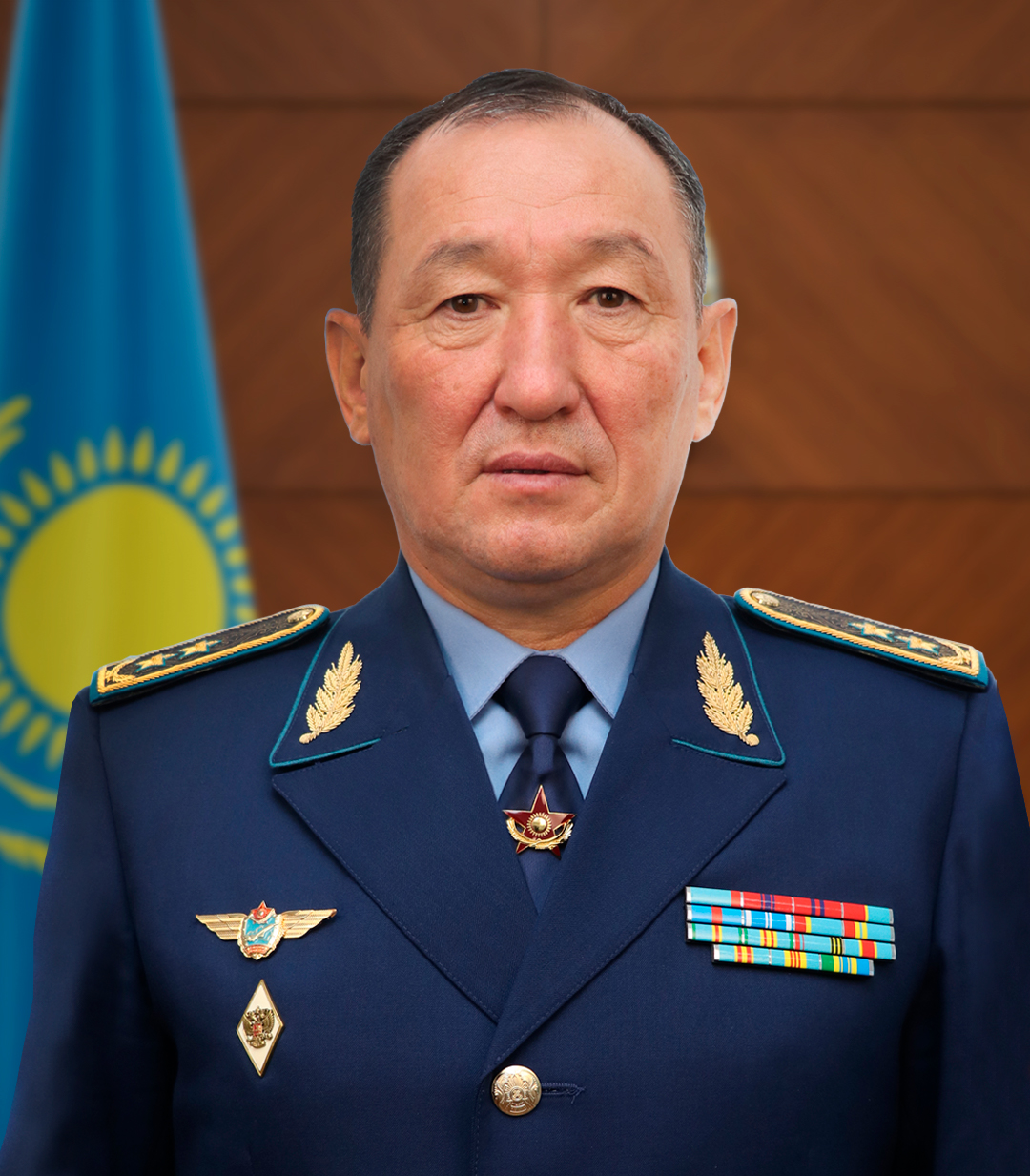
- Official portrait, 2025

Minister of Defence of Kazakhstan
- In office 8 June 2025 – 27 September 2026
- President: Kassym-Jomart Tokayev
- Prime Minister: Oljas Bektenov
- Preceded by: Ruslan Jaqsylyqov
- Succeeded by: Aidos Myrzahmetov

Deputy Minister of Defence
- In office 30 September 2024 – 8 June 2025
- Minister: Ruslan Jaqsylyqov

Personal details
- Born: 14 October 1969 (age 57) Novotroitskoye, Krasnokutsky District, Pavlodar Oblast, Kazakh SSR, Soviet Union

Military service
- Allegiance: Soviet Union (until 1991); Kazakhstan (1991–2026)
- Branch/service: Kazakh Air Force
- Years of service: 1990–present
- Rank: Lieutenant general

Däuren Jūmataiūly Qosanov (Note: Often transliterated as Dauren Zhumataevich Kossanov through a Russified Romanization of Даурен Жуматаевич Косанов.) (Kazakh: Дәурен Жұматайұлы Қосанов: born 4 March 1966) is a Kazakh Air Force general served as the Minister of Defence from 2025 to 2026. Following the deaths of 14 servicemen in the Caspian Sea, president Tokayev dismissed Qosanov from his post.

== Biography ==
Born on 14 October 1969, in the village of Novotroitskoye, Krasnokutsky District, Pavlodar Oblast. In 1990, he graduated from the Armavir Higher Military Aviation School of Pilots and began his service in the Usharal Fighter Regiment. He subsequently commanded a Su-27 squadron in Taldykorgan, served as chief of staff at the Karaganda airbase, and later as commander at the Shymkent airbase. In 2005, he graduated from the Gagarin Air Force Academy, and in 2013 from the Military Academy of the General Staff of the Armed Forces of the Russian Federation.

On 5 July 2013, by order of the President of Kazakhstan, he was appointed Commander of the Air Force of the Air Defence Forces of the Armed Forces of Kazakhstan. In 2015, he was awarded the rank of Major General of Aviation.

On 21 September 2019, he was relieved of his post as Commander-in-Chief of the Air Defence Forces. The following month, he was appointed head of the Talgat Bigeldinov Military Institute of the Air Defence Forces in Aktobe. In October 2022, he became First Deputy Chief of the General Staff of the Air Defence Forces, and in December of that year, was appointed Commander-in-Chief of the Air Defence Forces.

In 2024, he was promoted to the rank of Lieutenant General of Aviation. On 30 September 2024, he was appointed Deputy Minister of Defence and Commander-in-Chief of the Air Defence Forces. On 8 June 2025, he was appointed Minister of Defence of the Republic of Kazakhstan.

On September 24, 2026, 14 out of 17 servicemen were killed during naval exercises in the Caspian Sea. The incident triggered widespread social media criticism of the Defence Ministry, alongside demands for Qosanov's resignation. On September 26, a commission was established to conduct a comprehensive audit of the Defense Ministry. On September 27, Däuren Qosanov was dismissed and succeeded by Aidos Myrzahmetov.

== Awards ==
- Order "Aibyn" II degree
- Order "Dank" 1st class (2024)
- Medal "For military valor"
- Jubilee medal "20 years of independence of the Republic of Kazakhstan"
- Jubilee medal "10 years of the Armed Forces of the Republic of Kazakhstan"
- Jubilee medal "20 years of the Armed Forces of the Republic of Kazakhstan"
- Medals "For Impeccable Service" 1st, 2nd and 3rd degree
- "Military pilot-sniper"
- Commemorative medal "Major General of Aviation Talgat Begeldinov"
- Jubilee medal "20 years of the Navy of the Armed Forces of the Republic of Kazakhstan"
- Jubilee Medal "20 Years of the Armed Forces of the Republic of Tajikistan"
