= List of Airbus A400M Atlas orders and deliveries =

This article lists the orders and deliveries of the Airbus A400M.

== Summary of orders and deliveries ==
| A400M orders / deliveries | Orders | Deliveries | Backlog |
| Numbers | 178 | 141 | 38 |
| Percentage of the orders | – | 79.21% | 20.79% |

As of October 2026

== Orders and deliveries by customer ==
=== Detailed orders and deliveries by customer ===
The orders don't include the prototypes that won't be used operationally.

| Customer | Date of order (contract signed / cancelled) | Firm orders | Deliveries | Notes |
| (Belgium) Belgian Air Component | 27 May 2003 | + 7 | 7 | |
| (France) French Air and Space Force | 27 May 2003 | + 50 | 26 | |
| (Germany) German Air and Space Force | 27 May 2003 | + 60 | 53 | |
| (Germany) German Air and Space Force | 25 Jan 2011 | -7 | 53 | |
| (Indonesia) Indonesian Air Force | 18 Nov 2021 | + 2 | 2 | |
| (Kazakhstan) Kazakh Air Defence Forces | 1 Sep 2021 | + 2 | 2 | |
| Luxembourg Air Force | 27 May 2003 | + 1 | 1 | |
| (Malaysia) Royal Malaysian Air Force | 8 Dec 2005 | + 4 | 4 | |
| (South Africa) South African Air Force | 1 Dec 2004 | + 8 | – | Cancelled purchase. |
| (South Africa) South African Air Force | 5 Nov 2009 | 8 | – | Cancelled purchase. |
| (Spain) Spanish Air and Space Force | 27 May 2003 | + 27 | 14 | |
| (Turkey) Turkish Air Force | 27 May 2003 | + 10 | 10 | |
| (United Kingdom) Royal Air Force | 27 May 2003 | + 25 | 22 | |
| (United Kingdom) Royal Air Force | 29 Mar 2010 | 3 | 22 | |
| TOTAL | | 178 | 141 | |

As of October 2026

=== Summary of the firm orders and deliveries by customers ===
As of October 2026

== Orders and deliveries by year ==
=== Distributive representation ===
A400M orders and deliveries by year (distributive)
| | 2003 | 2004 | 2005 | 2006 | 2007 | 2008 | 2009 | 2010 | 2011 | 2012 | 2013 | 2014 | 2015 | 2016 | 2017 | 2018 |
| Orders | 180 | 8 | 4 | 0 | 0 | 0 | -8 | -3 | -7 | 0 | 0 | 0 | 0 | 0 | 0 | 0 |
| Deliveries | – | – | – | – | – | – | – | – | – | – | 2 | 8 | 11 | 17 | 19 | 17 |
| | 2019 | 2020 | 2021 | 2022 | 2023 | 2024 | 2025 | 2026 | 2027 | 2028 | 2029 | 2030 | 2031 | 2032 | 2033 | 2034 |
| Orders | 74 | 0 | 4 | 0 | 0 | 0 | 0 | 0 | – | – | – | – | – | – | – | – |
| Deliveries | 14 | 9 | 8 | 10 | 8 | 7 | 7 | 4 | – | – | – | – | – | – | – | – |

As of October 2026

=== Cumulative representation ===
Orders Deliveries

As of October 2026

== See also ==
- Airbus A400M
