= Military ranks of Kazakhstan =

The Military ranks of Kazakhstan are the military insignia used by the Armed Forces of the Republic of Kazakhstan. Being a former Soviet Republic, Kazakhstan shares a rank structure similar to Russia's.

== Commissioned officer ranks ==
The rank insignia of commissioned officers.

Rank group	General / flag officers					Senior officers			Junior officers
Kazakh Ground Forces
Kazakh Ground Forces	Жоғарғы Бас қолбасшының Joğarğı Bas qolbasşınıñ	Армия генералы Armïya generalı	Генерал-полковник; General-polkovnïk	Генерал-лейтенант; General-leytenant	Генерал-майор; General-mayor	Полковник; Polkovnïk	Подполковник; Podpolkovnïk	Майор; Mayor	Капитан; Kapïtan	Аға лейтенант Ağa leytenant	Лейтенант; Leytenant
Kazakh Naval Forces
Kazakh Naval Forces	Жоғарғы Бас қолбасшының Joğarğı Bas qolbasşınıñ		Адмирал; Admïral	Вице-адмирал; Vice-admïral	Контр-адмирал; Kontr-admïral	Бірінші дәрежелі капитан Birinşi därejeli kapïtan	Екінші дәрежелі капитан Ekinşi därejeli kapïtan	Үшінші дәрежелі капитан Üşinşi därejeli kapïtan	Капитан-лейтенант; Kapïtan-leytenant	Аға лейтенант Ağa leytenant	Лейтенант; Leytenant
Kazakh Air Defense Forces
Kazakh Air Defense Forces	Жоғарғы Бас қолбасшының Joğarğı Bas qolbasşınıñ		Генерал-полковник; General-polkovnïk	Генерал-лейтенант; General-leytenant	Генерал-майор; General-mayor	Полковник; Polkovnïk	Подполковник; Podpolkovnïk	Майор; Mayor	Капитан; Kapïtan	Аға лейтенант Ağa leytenant	Лейтенант; Leytenant
Rank group	General / flag officers					Senior officers			Junior officers

=== Student officer ranks ===
Rank group	Student officer			Students of military high schools
	Курсант-сержант; Kwrsant-serjant	Курсант-кіші сержант Kwrsant-kişi serjant	Курсант; Kwrsant	Кадет, ұлан Кадет, ұлан	Тәрбиеленуші; Tärbïelenwşi

== Other ranks ==
The rank insignia of non-commissioned officers and enlisted personnel.

Rank group	Senior NCOs								Junior NCOs	Enlisted
Kazakh Ground Forces
Kazakh Ground Forces	Шебер-сержант; Şeber-serjant	Штаб-сержант; Ştab-serjant	Бірінші сыныпты сержант Birinşi sınıptı serjant	Екінші сыныпты сержант Ekinşi sınıptı serjant	Үшінші сыныпты сержант Üşinşi sınıptı serjant	Аға сержант Ağa serjant	Cержант; Serjant	Кіші сержант Kişi serjant	Ефрейтор; Efreĭtor	Қатардағы жауынгер Qatardağı jawınger
Kazakh Naval Forces
Kazakh Naval Forces	Шебер-старшина; Şeber-starşïna	Штаб-старшина; Ştab-starşïna	Бірінші сыныпты старшина Birinşi sınıptı starşïna	Eкінші сыныпты старшина Ekinşi sınıptı starşïna	Үшінші сыныпты старшина Üşinşi sınıptı starşïna	Бас старшина Bas starshyna	Бірінші сатылы старшина Birinşi satılı starşïna	Екінші сатылы старшина Ekinşi satılı starşïna	Аға матрос Ağa matros	Матрос; Matros
Kazakh Air Defense Forces
Kazakh Air Defense Forces	Шебер-сержант; Şeber-serjant	Штаб-сержант; Ştab-serjant	Бірінші сыныпты сержант Birinşi sınıptı serjant	Екінші сыныпты сержант Ekinşi sınıptı serjant	Үшінші сыныпты сержант Üşinşi sınıptı serjant	Аға сержант Ağa serjant	Cержант; Serjant	Кіші сержант Kişi serjant	Ефрейтор; Efreĭtor	Қатардағы жауынгер Qatardağı jawınger
Rank group	Senior NCOs								Junior NCOs	Enlisted

== Historical rank insignia (1997-2006) ==
The Kazakh Armed Forces's rank insignia for commissioned officers, NCOs and enlisted personnel that once used between the reforming process of Kazakh military uniform and ranks in 1997 and the newest reform of the ranks structure in 2006, in which the supreme rank of Marshal of the Republic of Kazakhstan (Kazakh: Қазақстан Республикасының Маршалы) was abolished. Until 1997, Kazakh Armed Forces fully inherited and continued to use the ranks system of the Soviet Union. During the period of 1997 - 1999, the Kazakh Armed Forces continued to retain the Soviet pattern in the general officer one, while modified the lower officer, NCOs and enlisted one as it could reflected the 1994 regulations of the Russian ranks system. Later in 1999, the design of the ranks was changed into the more nationalistic one.

=== Commissioned officer ranks ===
Rank group	General / flag officers					Senior officers			Junior officers
(Kazakhstan) Kazakh Ground Forces (1997-1999)
(Kazakhstan) Kazakh Ground Forces (1997-1999)	Қазақстан Республикасының маршалы Qazaqstan Respublikasınıñ marshalı	Армия генералы Armïya generalı	Генерал-полковник; General-polkovnïk	Генерал-лейтенант; General-leytenant	Генерал-майор; General-mayor	Полковник; Polkovnïk	Подполковник; Podpolkovnïk	Майор; Mayor	Капитан; Kapïtan	Аға лейтенант Ağa leytenant	Лейтенант; Leytenant	Кіші лейтенант Kişi leytenant
(Kazakhstan) Kazakh Naval Forces (1997-1999)
(Kazakhstan) Kazakh Naval Forces (1997-1999)					Контр-адмирал; Kontr-admïral	Бірінші дәрежелі капитан Birinşi därejeli kapïtan	Екінші дәрежелі капитан Ekinşi därejeli kapïtan	Үшінші дәрежелі капитан Üşinşi därejeli kapïtan	Капитан-лейтенант; Kapïtan-leytenant	Аға лейтенант Ağa leytenant	Лейтенант; Leytenant	Кіші лейтенант Kişi leytenant
(Kazakhstan) Kazakh Air Forces (1997-1999)
(Kazakhstan) Kazakh Air Forces (1997-1999)		Армия генералы Armïya generalı	Генерал-полковник; General-polkovnïk	Генерал-лейтенант; General-leytenant	Генерал-майор; General-mayor	Полковник; Polkovnïk	Подполковник; Podpolkovnïk	Майор; Mayor	Капитан; Kapïtan	Аға лейтенант Ağa leytenant	Лейтенант; Leytenant	Кіші лейтенант Kişi leytenant
Rank group	General / flag officers					Senior officers			Junior officers

=== Other ranks ===
Rank group	Senior NCOs						Junior NCOs	Enlisted
(Kazakhstan) Kazakh Ground Forces (1997-1999)
(Kazakhstan) Kazakh Ground Forces (1997-1999)	Шебер прапорщик Şeber praporştşïk	Прапорщик; Praporştşïk	Старшина; Starshïna	Аға сержант Ağa serjant	Сержант; Serjant	Кіші сержант Kişi serjant	Ефрейтор; Efreytor	Қатардағы жауынгер Qatardağı jawınger
(Kazakhstan) Kazakh Naval Forces (1997-1999)
(Kazakhstan) Kazakh Naval Forces (1997-1999)	Шебер мичман Şeber mïtşman	Мичман; Mïtşman	Бас кеме старшинасы Bas keme starşïnası	Бас старшина Bas starşïna	Бірінші сатылы старшина Birinşi satılı starşïna	Екінші сатылы старшина Ekinşi satılı starşïna	Аға матрос Ağa matros	Матрос; Matros
(Kazakhstan) Kazakh Air Forces (1997-1999)
(Kazakhstan) Kazakh Air Forces (1997-1999)	Шебер прапорщик Şeber praporştşïk	Прапорщик; Praporştşïk	Старшина; Starşïna	Аға сержант Ağa serjant	Сержант; Serjant	Кіші сержант Kişi serjant	Ефрейтор; Efreytor	Қатардағы жауынгер Qatardağı jawınger
Rank group	Senior NCOs						Junior NCOs	Enlisted
