= Viktor Trufanov =

Viktor Trufanov Виктор Труфанов

Head of the Russian Coast Guard
- In office 2006–2011
- Preceded by: Vyacheslav Serzhanin
- Succeeded by: Yuri Alexeyev

Personal details
- Born: 6 December 1952 (age 73) Borovsky, Kazakh SSR (now Kazakhstan)
- Education: Dzerzhinsky KGB Higher School

Colonel General Viktor Trofimovich Trufanov (Russian: Виктор Трофимович Труфанов) was the Head of the Coast Guard Department of the Border Service of the Federal Security Service of Russia (2006-2011).

== Biography ==
He was born in December 6, 1952 in the village of Borovsky in the Borovsky District of the Kostanay Region in Kazakhstan.

In 1974 Trufanov graduated from Alma-Ata Higher Command School of the KGB Border Guard. In 1984 he finished the KGB Dzerzhinsky Higher School (now the FSB Academy).

From 1974 to 2003 he served in the KGB of and in the Russian FSB.

In 2003 Trufanov was appointed as a deputy head of the Border Services of the Russian Federal Security Service.

Viktor Trufanov is married with one daughter.

== Awards ==
His state awards:

- Order "For Military Merit."
- Medal "For Distinction in Guarding the State Border of the USSR"
- Golden Knight of Honour in "Public Recognition" (2004)
- Medal of Honor

and series of departmental awards and commemorative.
