= Nikolai Lukashevich =

Russian military officer (1941–2021)

- Native name: Николай Филиппович Лукашевич
- Born: 15 January 1941; Byelorussian SSR, Soviet Union
- Died: 15 June 2021 (aged 80) Moscow, Russia
- Buried: Federal Military Memorial Cemetery, Moscow Oblast
- Allegiance: Soviet Union; Russia
- Branch: Soviet Border Forces; FSB Border Service
- Service years: 1961–1999
- Rank: Colonel General
- Commands: Far Eastern Border District
- Awards: Order of Friendship of Peoples; Order of the Red Star

Nikolai Filippovich Lukashevich (Russian: Николай Филиппович Лукашевич; 15 January 1941 – 15 June 2021) was an officer of the Soviet military who held a number of posts in the Soviet Border Forces, and later the FSB Border Service, reaching the rank of colonel general.

== Career ==
Lukashevich was born on 15 January 1941 in what was then the Byelorussian Soviet Socialist Republic, in the Soviet Union. He joined the Soviet Border Forces in 1961, and in 1965 graduated from the Alma-Ata Higher Command Border School. He was initially posted to serve in various positions in the KGB's Eastern Border District, in the territory of the Kazakh Soviet Socialist Republic. Here he spent the next 20 years, rising from the rank of lieutenant to colonel, and from the position of deputy commander of a border outpost, to head of a front-line detachment.

Lukashevich enrolled in the Frunze Military Academy in 1971, graduating in 1974. He went on to be deputy chief and chief of staff of the 132nd Chundzhinsky Border Detachment of the Eastern Border District until 1981, and then head of the Border Detachment, based at Chundzha, until 1986. In 1984 his detachment received an "excellent" mark from the Chairman of the KGB for its performance in live-fire exercises. In 1986 he became deputy chief of staff of the Eastern Border District, and that year enrolled in the Military Academy of the General Staff of the Armed Forces. He was a student there until 1988, and after graduating, he was appointed deputy chief of forces of the Transcaucasian Border District in August that year. He held this position until 7 April 1990, when he was appointed head of the Alma-Ata Higher Command Border School. He continued to hold this post through the period of the dissolution of the Soviet Union in December 1991, but by 1992 the academy had become part of the newly independent Kazakhstan, and Lukashevich left to become head of the Russian Federation's Far Eastern Border District.

In May 1994 he joined the Academy of Border Forces, and from 1996 was a professor at the FSB Academy. He retired from the military in 1999 with the rank of colonel general, and went to work at the Atlas Science and Technology Center until 2008. Having become a specialist in the field of geopolitics and the theory of command and control, he wrote more than 20 scientific works, including three monographs, two textbooks and a number of teaching aids.

Lukashevich died on 15 June 2021 at the age of 80. He was buried at the Federal Military Memorial Cemetery on 17 June. Over his career he received numerous awards and honours, including the Order of Friendship of Peoples and the Order of the Red Star, various departmental awards, and 27 medals.
