= Territorial Troops (Kazakhstan) =

Territorial defense forces of Kazakhstan

- Flag of the Kazakh Defense Ministry
- Active: 25 December 2015 - present
- Country: Kazakhstan
- Branch: Armed Forces of Kazakhstan
- Type: Paramilitary; Militia
- Size: 63,000 (wartime)
- Part of: Ministry of Defense of Kazakhstan
- Headquarters: Astana

Commanders
- Current commander: Major General Sultan Kamaletdinov
- Notable commanders: Colonel Bauyrzhan Sakonov

The Territorial Troops (Kazakh: aумақтық əскерлері, romanized: aumaqtyq äskerlerı, Russian: Территориальные войска) are a volunteer paramilitary service of the Armed Forces of the Republic of Kazakhstan. Instead of being an independent service branch of the Armed Forces of Kazakhstan, it reports directly to the Ministry of Defense of Kazakhstan.

There are currently 16 departmental like territorial defense brigades stationed in 14 regions, as well as the capital and largest city of Nur-Sultan and Almaty. The independent defense brigades are designed to perform tasks within the internal borders of the administrative regions, similarly to State defense forces or National Guard in the United States.

During wartime situations, the territorial units have the potential to grow up to a size of over 60,000 military personnel.

== History ==
On November 6, 2001, President Nursultan Nazarbayev signed a secret presidential decree that called for a regulated organization to deal with defending the internal borders of Kazakh territory. Just close to 15 years later, in December 2015, the president approved a concept developed by the military which provided the basis for the territorial troops. The following March, the National government established the Main Directorate of Territorial Defense in the General Staff to act as the management body for the territorial troops.

For the first time in May 2017, a combined inter-regional contingent (East Kazakhstan, South Kazakhstan and the City of Astana) took part in the Defender of the Fatherland Day Military Parade on Astana's Independence Square, celebrating the 25th anniversary of the formation of the military. Since September 2017, the Territorial Troops have been included in the military doctrine of Kazakhstan.

== Command Structure ==
- Supreme Command Headquarters – The highest authority in the armed forces, declares the period of mobilization, martial law, and general defense of the territory
- Ministry of Defense – An authorized body responsible for the implementation of a unified state policy in the field of territorial defense
- General Staff – It coordinates the planning of territorial defense, organizes the actions of forces and equipment involved in the performance of territorial defense tasks, and exercises overall leadership of territorial troops
- Main Directorate of Territorial Defense of the Armed Forces (GUTO) – A working body of the General Staff that provides general leadership to the territorial troops
- Local administrative bodies
- Territorial Defense Brigades – They are the military components that are spread around the country and make up the composition of the Territorial Troops.

== See also ==
- Irregular military
- Paramilitary
- Gendarmerie
- Militia

Similar units

- Territorial Troops Militia
- Territorial Defense (Yugoslavia)
- Narodnoe Opolcheniye
- State defense force
