= Military Engineering Institute of Radio Electronics and Communications =

Educational Institution

Coordinates: 43°13′1.5″N 76°52′24.5″E

- Радиоэлектроника және байланыс әскери инженерлік институты
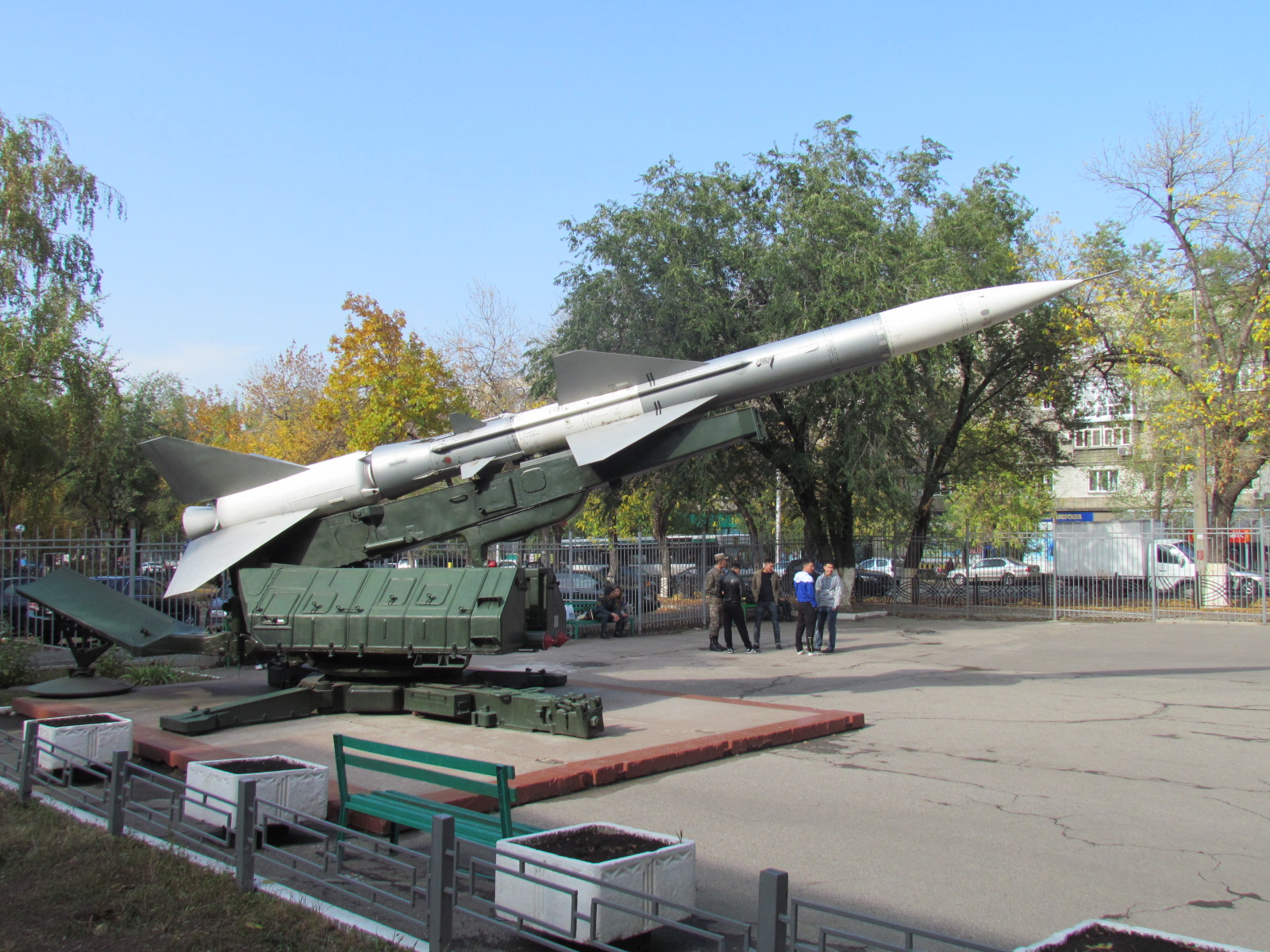
- A S-75 launcher on Altynsarin Avenue near the institute, 5 October 2014.
- Type: military academy
- Established: 2001
- Founders: Ministry of Defense
- Affiliations: Armed Forces of Kazakhstan
- Director: Major General Askar Mustabekov
- Location: 53 Zhandosova Street, Almaty, Kazakhstan

The Military Engineering Institute of Radio Electronics and Communications (VIIREiS) (Kazakh: Радиоэлектроника және байланыс әскери инженерлік институты, romanized: Radioelektronika jäne bailanys äskeri injenerlık instituty; Russian: Военно-инженерный институт радиоэлектроники и связи; ВИИРЭиС) is a specialized educational institution in the Armed Forces of Kazakhstan, based in Almaty. It specializes in the preparation of qualified command personnel for communications units, anti-aircraft missile and radioengineering troops, radioengineering for military aircraft, and automated systems for command and control of the armed forces.

== History ==
It was formed on the basis of the Military Department at the Academy of Civil Aviation in Almaty on the basis of a decree of the Government of Kazakhstan on 15 October 2001 and by directive of Minister of Defense Mukhtar Altynbayev on 20 February 2002. Previously, in 1995, the military department was created at the academy. With its establishment, VIIREiS became the first and only military university in the post-Soviet republics of Central Asia to engineers in radio engineering specialties. In September 2002, the institute received its combat banner.

== Educational ascpects ==
Currently, the institute trains radio engineer officers in 5 specialties. Over the years, the institute has become one of the leading military educational institutions in the Republic of Kazakhstan. Three employees of the institute are full members and corresponding members of the Republican Public Association "Academy of Military Sciences". The institute consists of the following departments:

- Department of Social and Humanitarian Disciplines
- Department of Special Disciplines
- Department of Radio Engineering
- Department of Air Defense of the Ground Forces
- Department of Organization of Communication
- Department of Physical Training
- Department of the Basics of Military Radio Engineering and Electronics
- Department of General Disciplines
- Department of Information Security
- Department of Multichannel Systems
- Department of Natural - Scientific Disciplines
- Department of Foreign Languages
- Department of Single-Channel Systems
- Department of Automated Control Systems
- Department of Radio Engineering Troops
- Department of State Language
- Department of Military Communications Technology

== Student life ==
The Institute has a modern educational and material base. Classrooms and laboratories are equipped with various radio stands and computer equipment, simulators and training complexes. The offices of the department of state and foreign languages are equipped with linguaphone equipment. The Institute's library has a large number of modern textbooks and manuals on radio engineering, automation, computer technology and other areas of education. To consolidate theoretical knowledge, cadets undergo training at the Institute's Training Center, where practical exercises on military equipment and weapons are held. The institute publishes the military-technical journal "Military Proceedings of VIIREiS", on the pages of which scientists from near and far abroad have been publishing their scientific works for 10 years. For the first time among the military universities of the Commonwealth of Independent States countries in the post-Soviet space, the institute was entrusted with hosting the 3rd and 4th International Mathematics Olympiads. The institute’s team took the second place for two years in a row, losing leadership only to the cadet team of the Russian Federation. Institute staff and cadets have repeatedly taken an active part in the work of the International Exhibition of Weapons Systems and Military Equipment (KADEX). Among talent groups in the Institute, there is a "Club of the Merry and Inventive" team in the institute.

== See also ==
- Budyonny Military Academy of the Signal Corps
- Heer and Luftwaffe Signals School
- Military Institute of Telecommunications and Information Technologies
