= Jaqipbek Maldybayev =

Kazakh Soviet Air Force pilot

Jaqipbek Maldibayev
- Native name: Жақыпбек Малдыбаев
- Born: 15 May 1907; Shengeldy village, Zaysan District, Russian Empire
- Died: 8 June 1938 (aged 31) Tashkent, Uzbek SSR, USSR
- Allegiance: Soviet Union
- Conflicts: Basmachi revolt Spanish Civil War

Jaqipbek Maldybayev (Kazakh: Жақыпбек Малдыбаев, Russian: Жакыпбек Малдыбаев; 15 May 1907 — 8 June 1938) was the first Kazakh combat pilot. Trained as a reconnaissance pilot, he participated in military operations against the Basmachis and in the Spanish Civil War as a soldier-internationalist.

== Early life ==
Maldybayev was born on 15 May 1907 to an impoverished Kazakh family in Shengeldy village. He received a basic religious education where he learned to read before starting work in a gold mine at an early age, and also worked as a herdsmen. There were 13 children in his family, but only five lived to adulthood; in 1928 he became head of the local committee of laborers. He was drafted into the Red Army in 1929.

== Military service ==
After joining the army he was stationed in the Turkmen SSR and became an assistant platoon commander in the 82nd Special Cavalry Brigade. He participated in battles against Basmachi terrorists in the Karakum and Kyzylkum deserts. In 1932 he graduated from the Central Asian Military School named after Lenin in Stalinabad, and in 1933 he graduated from the 9th Military Aviation School of Pilots (which was renamed to the Kharkov Higher Military Aviation School in 1938), where he trained to be an observer pilot. In 1934 he was appointed as the senior observer pilot and head of the photographic service in the 40th Special Aviation Detachment, based in Stalinabad. Promoted to the rank of lieutenant in 1936, he continued to serve in aviation, becoming a navigator in 1937 and later being admitted to the N. E. Zhukovsky Air Force Engineering Academy in Moscow. While studying at the academy he met a Russian girl named Yulia who he married, and they had a daughter named Emma. In 1938 he became one of the 772 Soviet pilots who volunteered to serve in the Spanish Civil War.

He died in a plane crash in Tashkent while returning from his service in Spain. He was buried with full honors in a pilot's cemetery at a military airfield in the city. In 2022 a monument to him was erected in Oskemen. There are streets bearing his name in several cities in Kazakhstan and a secondary school named in his honor in his native village of Shengeldy.

== See also ==
- Talgat Bigeldinov
- Khiuaz Dospanova
- Nurken Abdirov
