= Special forces of Kazakhstan =

Military branch derived from former Soviet units

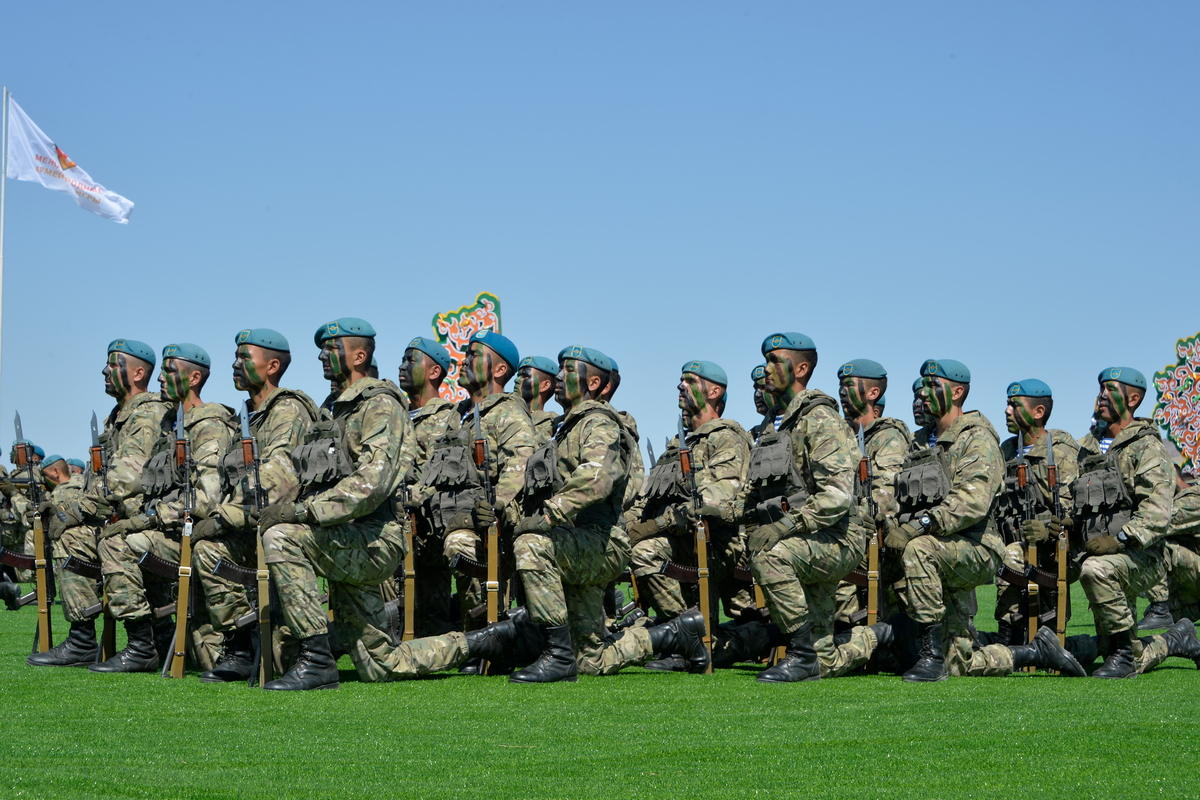
Kazakh spetnaz at the International Army Games.

The Special Forces of Kazakhstan (Kazakh: Қазақстанның арнайы жасағы, romanized: Qazaqstannyñ arnaiy jasağy; Russian: Спецназ Казахстана, romanized: Spetsnaz Kazakhstana) trace their history to the Soviet-era spetsnaz units operating on the territory of the Kazakh Soviet Socialist Republic within the USSR. These units are the remnants of the former Soviet Army, KGB, the Ministry of Internal Affairs and GRU. Similarly to other post-Soviet states, Kazakhstan's special forces fall under the control of the Armed Forces of the Republic, the Ministry of Interior, and the National Security Committee.

Special Forces Day is officially celebrated on June 9, in honor of the signing by the President of Kazakhstan Nursultan Nazarbayev of the decision on the formation of the Coordinating Council of Special Purpose Units of State Agencies under the Security Council.

== Armed Forces Special Forces ==
=== Army ===
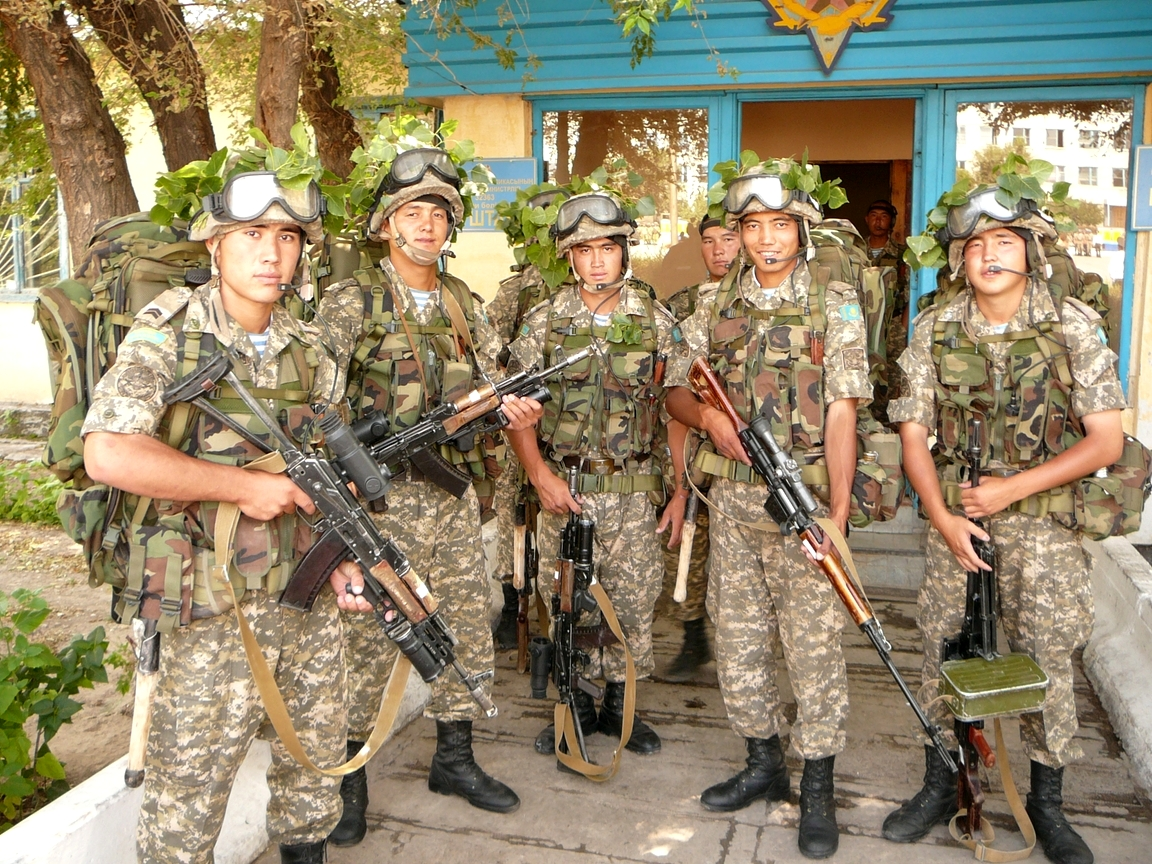
Servicemen of the airmobile forces

To form the front-line reconnaissance unit of the Central Asian Military District, the General Staff on March 10, 1976, directed the formation of the 22nd Separate Special-Purpose Brigade, deployed in the city of Kapchagay. In 1980, on the basis of the 22nd brigade, the 177th Separate Special-Purpose Detachment was created, which ended up serving in the Soviet–Afghan War as well as preparing for any impact or spillover of the Xinjiang conflict in China. In March 1993, on the basis of the directive of the Ministry of Defense of Kazakhstan, the airborne forces were founded. On February 24, 1994, the first special unit was created as part of the Armed Forces. Thus, February 24, 1994, is considered the birthday of the Army Special Forces, carrying the traditions of the Kapchagay Special Forces of the Soviet Army.

5 separate special forces battalions exist under the GRU of the MoD.

Today, the Airborne troops sport the following Spetsnaz units:

- 35th Guards Air Assault Brigade at Kapshagai
- 37th Air Assault Brigade at Taldykorgan
- 38th Air Assault Brigade (AZBRIGP peacekeeping Brigade at Almaty

=== Navy ===
- 390th Guards Naval Infantry Brigade

== NSC Special Forces ==
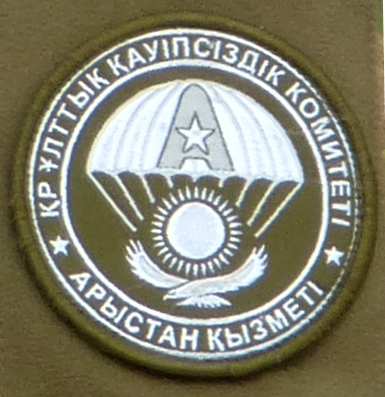
The shoulder patch of Arystan.

The Arystan ("Lions") Commando Unit (Russian: специального назначения «Арыстан») falls under the Office of the National Security Committee. It was created as part of the Presidential Security Service on 13 January 1992, succeeding the Soviet era Alpha Group of the Almaty Oblast (12th Group), which was dissolved in October 1990 as a result of the dissolution of the USSR. In April 1993, it has been known as the Arystan Unit and has since been nicknamed the Holy Slim of Kazakhstan (Қасиетті Елім Қазақстан). Its area of operations include the capital of Nur-Sultan, Almaty (the largest city), and Aktau (to ensure safety in the oil-producing fields). It receives training from the Special Purpose Center (CSN) of the Russian Federal Security Service, the American FBI, as well as the GSG 9 of the Federal Police of Germany. Notable commanders include Viktor Karpukhin and Amangeldy Shabdarbayev.

=== Other ===
- Kuat
- OBG (operational combat teams)
- KNB Border Service Special Forces

== Interior Ministry ==
=== Sunkar ===
The Sunkar Special Purpose Detachment (Kazakh: Сұңқар - Сокол) serves as the rapid reaction forces of the Kazakhstani police forces, akin to the American SWAT and the Russian Vityaz. It was founded on 11 May 1998, and has since 2003 been used exclusively for dealing with some of the most difficult tasks. Its combat mission is to capture and eliminate armed criminals and conduct special missions to free hostages. Its headquarters is located in Almaty, and has 5 regional offices throughout structurally. As a whole, it consists of just over 100 people. The current commander is Colonel Dulat Kurmashev.

=== Other ===
- Berkut (National Guard of Kazakhstan)
- Arlan
- SOBR

== State Security Service ==
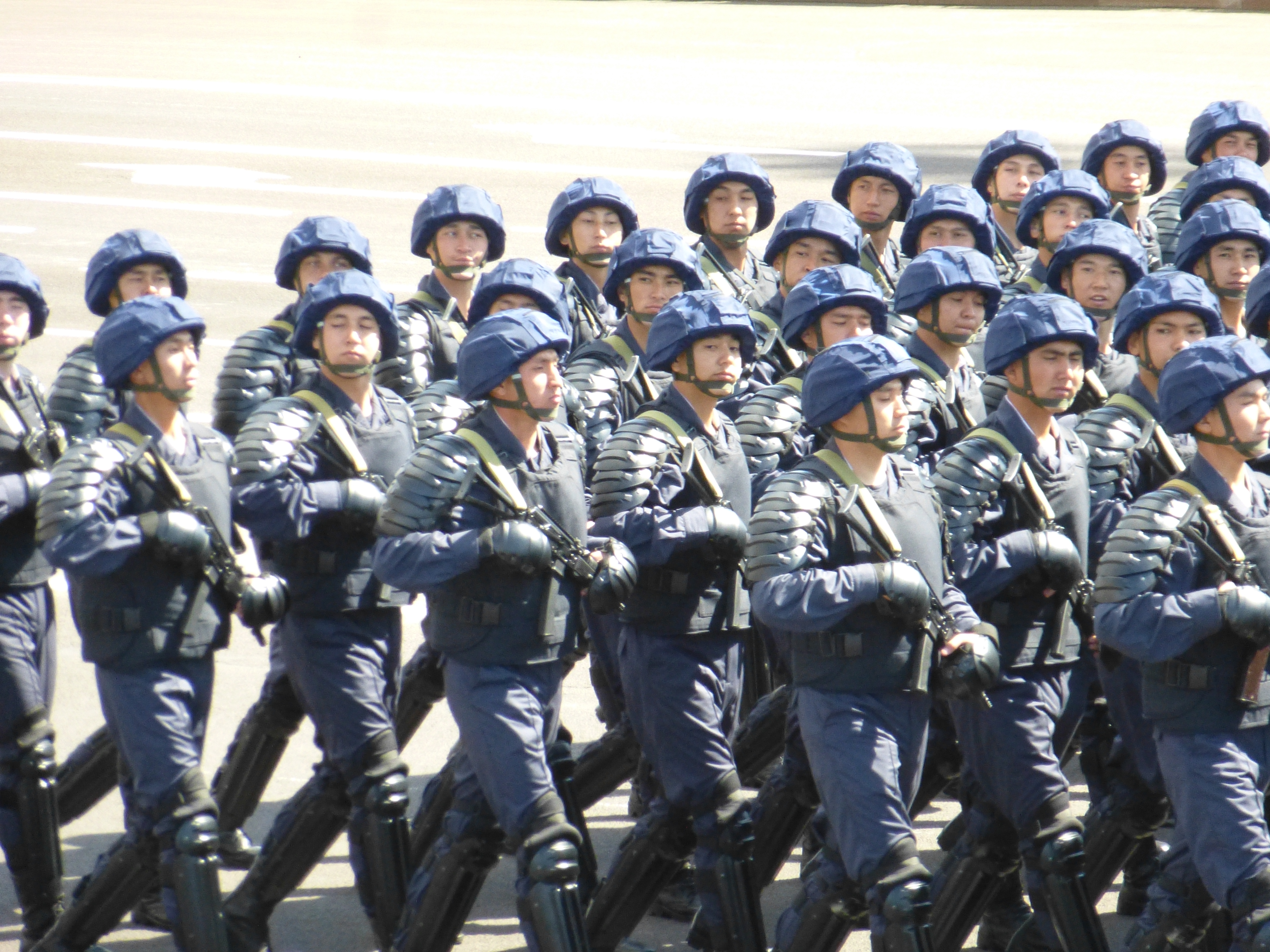
Servicemen of the National Guard.

The Special Forces of the State Security Service, formerly known as the Republican Guard, was an independent service branch of the armed forces, and it currently serves to protect the residences of the President of Kazakhstan. It was established on March 6, 1992, when President Nursultan Nazarbayev signed a decree on their creation on the basis of a separate brigade of operational designation of the Internal Troops deployed in the village of Kaskelen district of Almaty region. The Republican Guard was established in March 1992, when President Nazarbayev signed a decree on their creation on the basis of a unit of the Internal Troops deployed in the village of Ak Zhar in Kaskelen. In May 2017, the use of the term Republican Guard was abolished by authorities, and in June 2019, its remnants were transformed into a special forces unit under the SGO. The unit receives the same training as reconnaissance units and is additionally also trained in hand-to-hand combat, as well as airborne operations.

The Kokzhal (meaning wolf pack in Kazakh language) Special Forces Detachment was its own special forces unit under the Republican Guard responsible for carrying out anti terror operations as well as serving as a protection detail for the President.

== Other units ==
=== Nazarbayev Special Forces ===
The Separate Brigade of Special Operations named after the Supreme Commander-in-Chief of the Armed Forces of the Republic of Kazakhstan Nursultan Nazarbayev (Russian: Отдельной бригады специальных операций имени Верховного Главнокомандующего ВС РК Нурсултана Назарбаева) was a conceptual unit of the armed forces proposed by Lieutenant Colonel Murat Mukhamedzhanov. In November 2015, the government considered initiating the creation of an elite military unit under the leadership of Kazakh President Nursultan Nazarbayev to "confront an external or internal threat."

=== Units under uniformed civilian services ===
- Customs Control Committee of the Ministry of Finance
  - Territorial Rapid Response Squads
- Financial Police
  - Territorial Physical Protection Units
- Committee of the Criminal Executive System of the Ministry of Justice
  - Territorial Units of Special Purpose
