= Aidos Myrzahmetov =

Kazakh military officer (born 1981)

Major general Aidos Myrzahmetov
- Айдос Мырзахметов
- Official portrait, 2026

Minister of Defense of Kazakhstan
- Incumbent
- Assumed office 27 September 2026
- President: Kassym-Jomart Tokayev
- Prime Minister: Oljas Bektenov
- Preceded by: Däuren Qosanov

Personal details
- Born: 12 August 1981 (age 45) Jambyl, Almaty Region, Kazakh SSR, Soviet Union
- Children: 3
- Education: Military Academy of the Armed Forces of Kazakhstan, National Defense University of Kazakhstan
- Awards: Order of Valor 2nd class

Military service
- Allegiance: Kazakhstan
- Service: State Security Service; Special forces of Kazakhstan; Defense Ministry
- Service years: 2002–2024; 2024–2026; 2026–present
- Rank: Major general

Aidos Säkenūly Myrzahmetov (Note: Often transliterated as Aidos Sakenovich Myrzakhmetov through a Russified Romanization of Айдос Сакенович Мырзахметов.) (Note: Kazakh: Айдос Сәкенұлы Мырзахметов) (born 12 August 1981) is a Kazakh military officer serving as the defense minister since 2026.

== Biography ==
Aidos Sakenuly Myrzahmetov was born on 12 August 1981 in Jambyl, a district in Almaty Region.

In 2002, he graduated with honors from the Military Academy of the Armed Forces of Kazakhstan.

The specific details of his career within the State Security Service of Kazakhstan (SSS) are not disclosed in public sources. According to his official biography, prior to 2022, he advanced through all ranks of officer service within the SSS, holding various command and leadership positions, and completed several operational and command training courses within the national security and state security systems. In March 2022, Myrzahmetov headed the Eighth Department of SSS.

On 9 January 2024, by president Kassym-Jomart Tokayev's decree Myrzahmetov was appointed Commander of the Special forces of Kazakhstan.

In 2025, he graduated from the National Defense University of Kazakhstan, which had been reorganized from the military academy he originally completed in 2002.

On 24 September 2026, 14 out of 17 servicemen were killed during naval exercises in the Caspian Sea. The incident triggered widespread social media criticism of the Defence Ministry, alongside demands for Däuren Qosanov's resignation. On 26 September, a commission was established to conduct a comprehensive audit of the Defense Ministry. On 27 September, Tokayev dismissed Qosanov from his post and appointed Aidos Myrzahmetov as the new Defence Minister. On the same day, during a meeting at the Defense Ministry, Tokayev announced a comprehensive military reform and outlined the key strategic objectives for Myrzahmetov.

== Personal life ==
Aidos Myrzahmetov is married and has three children. Also he speaks Russian in addition to his native Kazakh.

== Awards and ranks ==
- Order of Valor 2nd class (2022).

=== Rank ===
- Major general (2026).
- Colonel (until 2026).
