= Karaganda Zhas Ulan Republican School =

- Type: boarding school
- Established: 27 June 1984; 41 years ago
- Affiliations: Armed Forces of the Republic of Kazakhstan
- Location: Karaganda, Karaganda Region, Kazakhstan
- Language: Kazakh, Russian
- Colors: Light Blue

The Zhas Ulan Republican School named after Talgat Begeldinov (Russian: Республиканская школа Жаса Улана имени Талгат Бегельдинов) also known as the Karaganda Zhas Ulan Republican School is a military boarding school in Kazakhstan's Armed Forces which specializes in the training of Kazakh youth who want to join the military.

== History ==
It was formed as the Karaganda Republican Boarding School by the by decree of the Council of Ministers of the Kazakh Soviet Socialist Republic on 27 June 1984, with the task being to train Soviet officers from among the national youth. On 9 July 1992, it was given its current name and has since 4 August 1992, been named after two-time Hero of the Soviet Union Talgat Begeldinov. Over its three decades of existence, it has produced over 25 graduating classes. In 2015, it was transferred to the Ministry of Defense and renamed in accordance with a government resolution to its current name.
