= Border Service of the National Security Committee of the Republic of Kazakhstan =

Border Service of the Republic of Kazakhstan

Border Service of the National Security Committee of the Republic of Kazakhstan Қазақстан ұлттық қауіпсіздік комитеті шекара қызметі Qazaqstan ūlttyq qauıpsızdık komitetı şekara qyzmetı
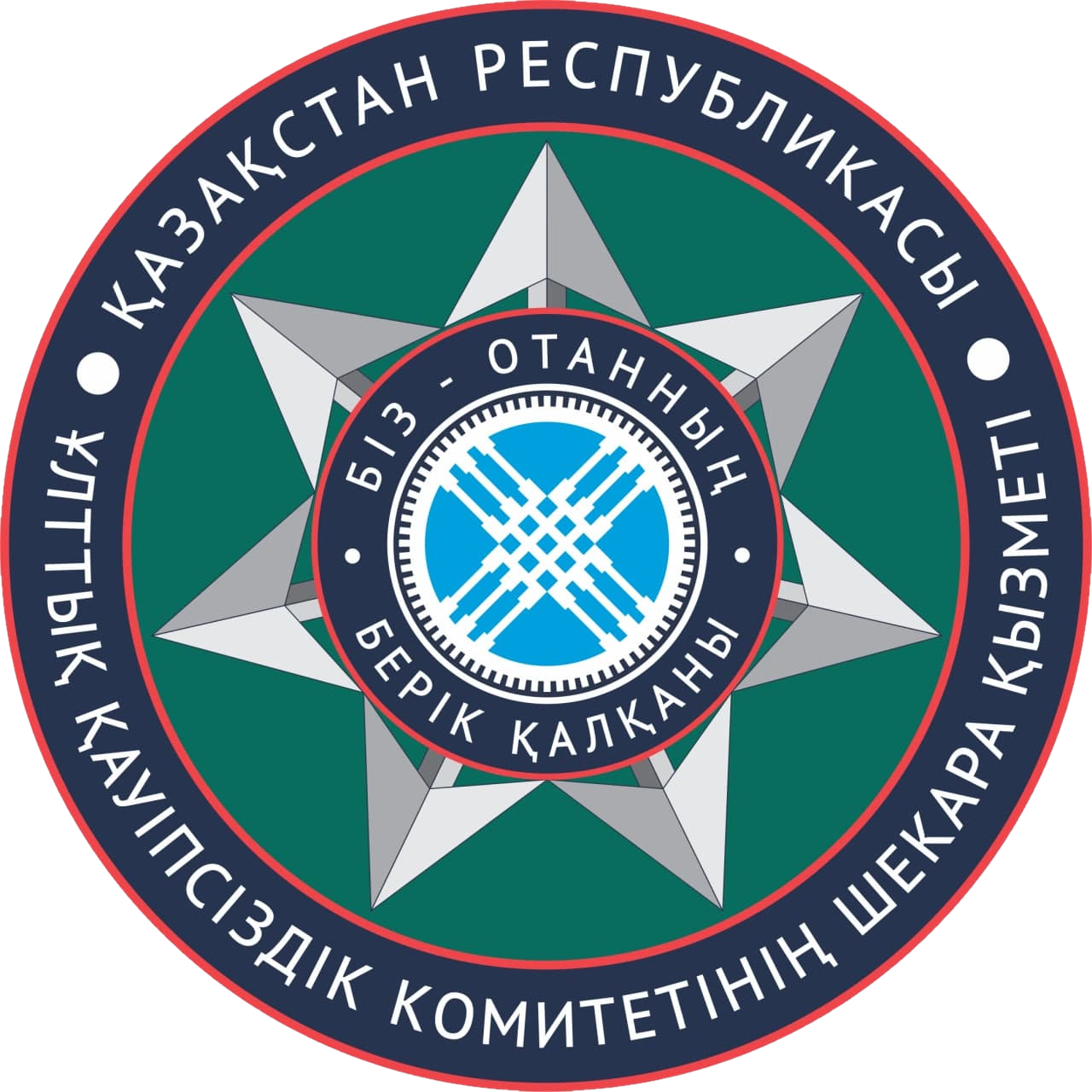
- Seal of the Border Guard Service

- Banner of the State Border Service of Kazakhstan

Agency overview
- Formed: August 18, 1992
- Preceding agency: Soviet Border Troops

Jurisdictional structure
- Operations jurisdiction: Kazakhstan
- Specialist jurisdiction: National border patrol, security, integrity

Operational structure
- Headquarters: 24 Volodarsky Street, Astana, Kazakhstan
- Elected officer responsible: Yermek Sagimbayev, NSC Chairman
- Agency executive: Major General Yerlan Aldazhumanov, Director of the Border Service
- Parent agency: National Security Committee of the Republic of Kazakhstan

Website
- www.shekaraknb.kz

The Border Service of the National Security Committee of the Republic of Kazakhstan (Kazakh: Қазақстан ұлттық қауіпсіздік комитеті шекара қызметі, romanized: Qazaqstan ūlttyq qauıpsızdık komitetı şekara qyzmetı; Russian: Пограничная служба Комитета национальной безопасности Республики Казахстан, romanized: Pogranichnaya sluzhba Komiteta natsional'noy bezopasnosti Respubliki Kazakhstan) is a governmental paramilitary force that manages the international borders of Kazakhstan. August 18 is celebrated as the Day of the Border Troops, which is the professional holiday of the Border service.

== History ==
On August 18, 1992, in accordance with the Law “On State Independence of the Republic of Kazakhstan” and in coordination with the newly formed Commonwealth of Independent States (CIS), President Nursultan Nazarbayev ordered the establishment of the border troops from a compound of the Eastern Border District of the KGB Border Guard of the USSR. In accordance with the intergovernmental treaties on collective security in May 1992, the Parliament of Kazakhstan adopted a Decree on consolidating a Kazakhstani battalion to strengthen the external borders of the CIS in December of that same year. The border troops developed a military council in April 1993 and had begun to incorporate maritime elements into the service a couple of days before the Victory Day holiday on May 9. The maritime units were located at the seaport of Aktau in the Mangystau region which was determined to be the location of all sea units of the border guards. In 1994, combat activities of the Border troops were carried out for the first time against the background of positive development of interstate relations based on an agreement on the Kazakh-Chinese Border signed in May 1994.

In order to improve the protection of the Kazakh border, President Nazarbayev in May 1995 converted the Border troops into an independent government agency called the State Committee of the Republic of Kazakhstan, of which Major General Bolat Zakiev was appointed as chairman.

By decree of the President dated November 17, 1997, the Border Troops were reformed into the Security Forces of the Ministry of Defense. In the early 2000s, regional commands were formed to ensure the protection of the border of Kazakhstan, irrespective of the region. In 2011, it was decided to reform the border department of Kazakhstan in order to maximize its adaptation to the modern era, transferring its mission of the administrative protection of the border to an operational component. In 2012, August 18 was officially declared as the Day of the Border Guard, replacing the Border Guards Day holiday on May 28.

== Timeline of border agreements ==
- July 17, 1997 – President Nazarbayev and Kyrgyz President Askar Akaev signed a memorandum on the delimitation of the State border between Kazakhstan and Kyrgyzstan in Cholpon-Ata.
- July 1998 – The process of delimitation of the border between Kazakhstan and China was completed.
- January 2000 – Nazarbayev and Chinese President Jiang Zemin signed a joint communiqué on the full settlement of border issues between the Kazakhstan and the China.
- May 2002 – A protocol on the demarcation of the Kazakhstan-China border was signed between Kazakhstan and China.
- January 18, 2005 – Nazarbayev and President Vladimir Putin of Russia signed a treaty on the Russo-Kazakh border, which defined the line of passage of the longest continuous land border in the world.
- 2008 – The demarcation of the border with Turkmenistan and Uzbekistan was completed.

== State Symbols ==
The border guard service was awarded the honor of having official state symbols on November 20, 1996, by decree of President Nazarbayev. The entire service sports its own flag and seal, the latter of which consists of a blue star on a green circle with a yellow bird (similar to the one seen on the Kazakh flag) located at the under the circle. The naval components of the border service also maintain their own naval jacks and ensigns, which are flown on top of ships and vessels of the border guard.

== Structure ==
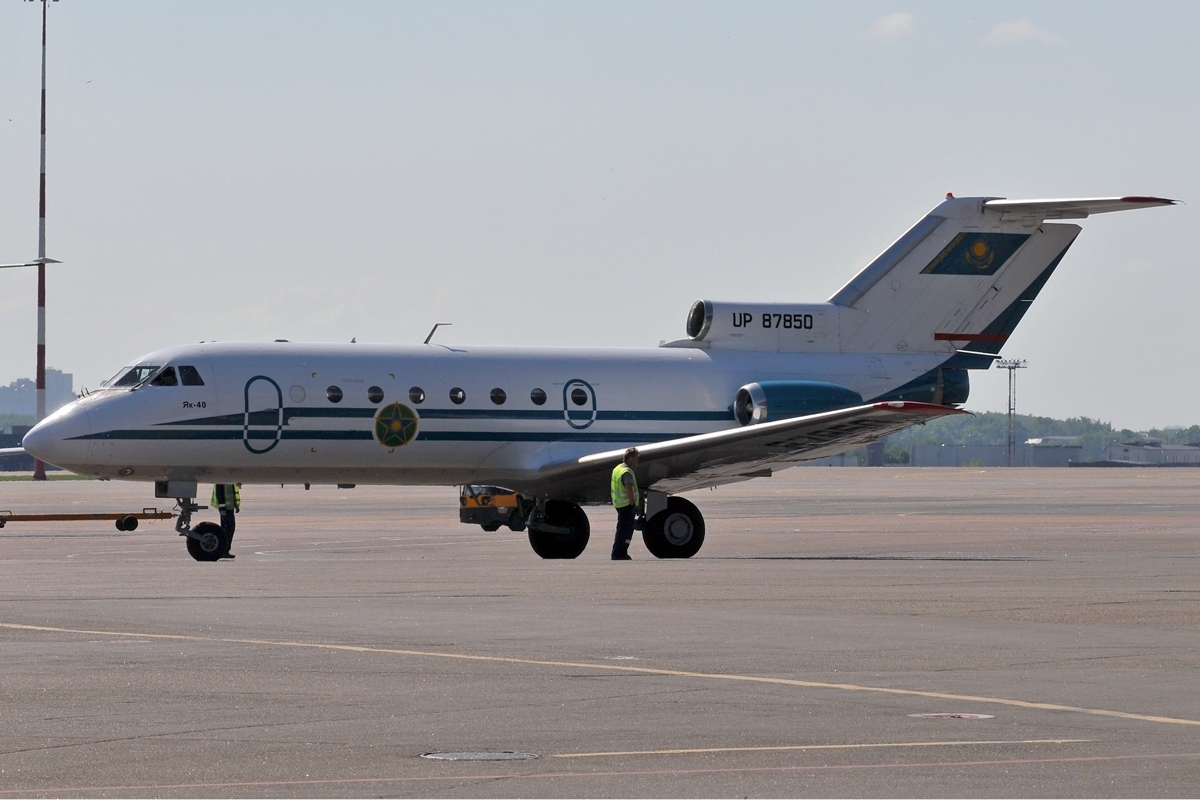
A Yakovlev Yak-40 of the Kazakh Border Guard.

- Central Office of the Border Guard Service
- Border units
  - Border Commandants
  - Border Posts
  - Border Checkpoints
- Air Police
- Coast Guard
- Support units
- Specialized military schools

=== Regional Directorates ===
- Regional Directorate "West"
- Regional Directorate "South"
- Regional Directorate "Vostok"
- Regional Directorate "North"
- Regional Coast Guard Directorate — Guards Kazakhstan's maritime border in the Caspian Sea.

=== Academy ===
The Academy of the Border Service of the National Security Committee (Kazakh: Ұлттық қауіпсіздік әскери институты / Russian: Академия Пограничной службы КНБ) is the official military institution of the border service. It was founded by the Soviet Government on December 26, 1931, and was put under the control of the Joint State Political Directorate. In April 1957, the school was put under the authority and jurisdiction of the Committee for State Security (KGB) and was later transformed into a four-year school, which would be based in Alma-Ata (now Almaty). It was reformed in 1993, as the Military Institute of the NSC which it would hold until it was given its current name in 2012.

== Tasks ==
Primary tasks of the Border Service include:

- Creating a border policy
- Enhancing border security
- Protecting the Kazakh border with Russia, China, Kyrgyzstan, Uzbekistan, and Turkmenistan, as well as a large portion of the Caspian Sea
- Preventing and suppress encroachments on the territorial integrity of Kazakhstan
- Fulfilling international obligations in relation to the international borders
- Participating in the defense of the Republic of Kazakhstan from the national border
- Assisting law enforcement and environmental authorities in the protection of citizens and natural resources on the border

== Directors ==
- Lieutenant General Evgeny Neverovsky (August 1992 – October 1992)
- Lieutenant General Bolat Zakiev (October 1992 – June 1997)
- Major General Toktasyn Buzubayev (June 1997 – July 1999)
- Lieutenant General Bolat Zakiev (July 1999 – May 2008)
- Major General Bolat Kirgizbaev (May 2008 – February 2011)
- Major General Nurzhan Myrzaliev (February 2011 – June 2012)
- Lieutenant General Nurlan Dzhulamanov (January 15, 2013 – October 27, 2014)
- Major General Darkhan Dilmanov (October 27, 2014 – April 5, 2022)
- Major General Yerlan Aldazhumanov (Since May 23, 2022)

== Awards ==
In accordance with a decree of President Nazarbayev on September 30, 2011, the following state awards for the service were established:

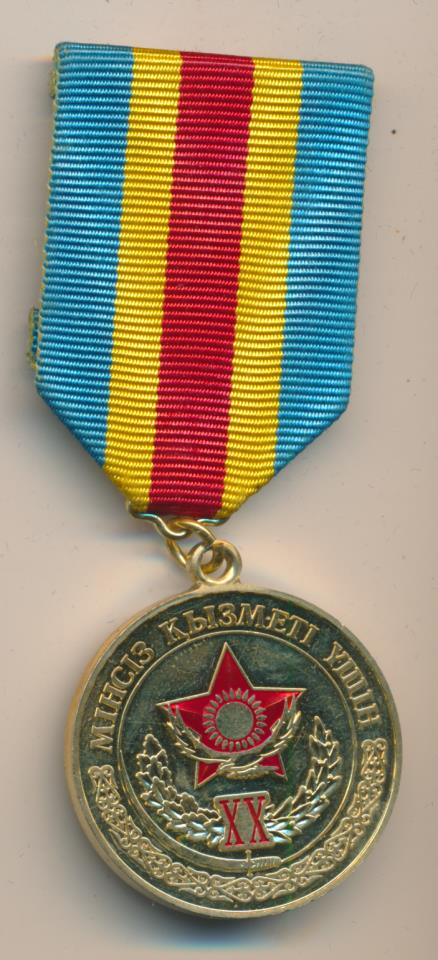
Medal "For Impeccable Service" 1st degree

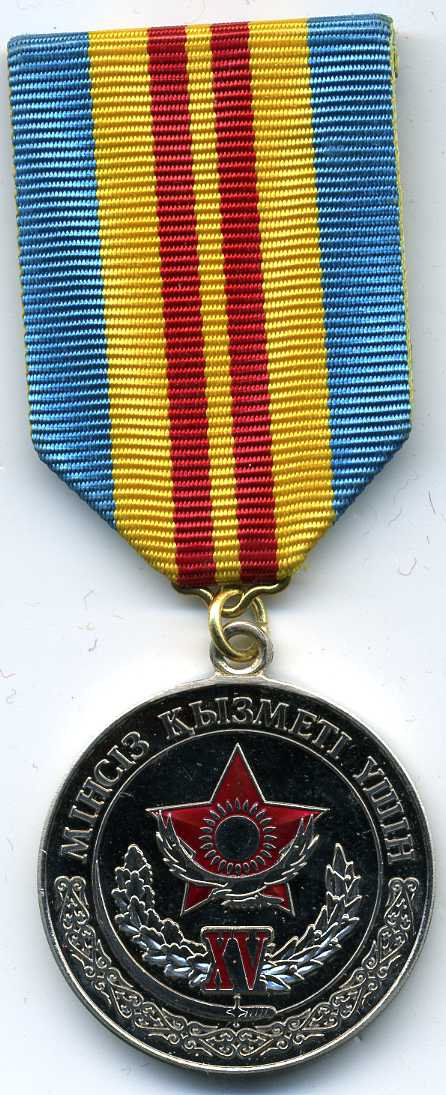
Medal "For Impeccable Service" 2nd degree

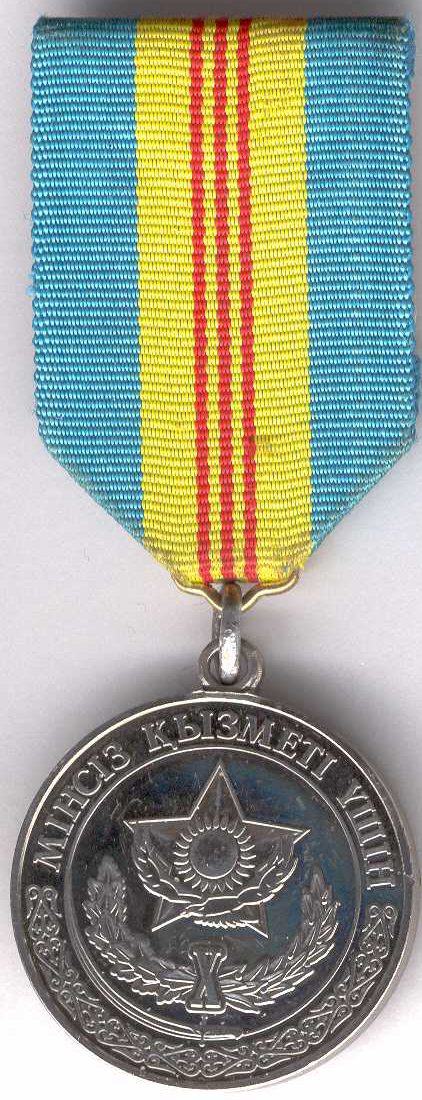
Medal "For Impeccable Service" 3rd degrees

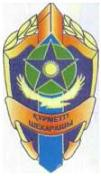
Honorary Border Guard Badge

== See also ==
- Armed Forces of Kazakhstan
- Ministry of Defense (Kazakhstan)
- National Security Committee of the Republic of Kazakhstan
- Visa policy of Kazakhstan
