= Academy of the Border Service of the National Security Committee =

Kazakhstani military institute

- Former names: Alma-Ata Higher Border Command School
- Type: military academy
- Established: December 26, 1931
- Founders: Government of Kazakhstan
- Affiliations: National Security Committee of Kazakhstan
- Rector: Colonel Pavel Polivanov
- Location: Almaty, Kazakhstan

The Academy of the Border Service of the National Security Committee (Kazakh: Ұлттық қауіпсіздік әскери институты, romanized: Ūlttyq qauıpsızdık äskeri instituty, Russian: Академия Пограничной службы КНБ) is the official military institution of the Border Service of the National Security Committee of the Republic of Kazakhstan.

== History ==
It was founded by the Soviet Government on 26 December 1931 and was made into an educational directorate of the Joint State Political Directorate in the Ukrainian SSR. It was originally based from the Ukrainian city of Kharkiv and was named as the Second Normal School of Border Guard and OGPU troops. In April 1938, the school was renamed the Kharkov Military School of the Border and Internal Troops of the NKVD named after Felix Dzerzhinsky with a term of study of two years. In April 1957, the school was put under the authority and jurisdiction of the Committee for State Security (KGB). On 15 July 1960, by order of the Council of Ministers of the USSR the educational institution was transformed into the Alma-Ata Higher Border Command School and was transformed into a four-year school. At the fall of the Soviet Union, three quarters of all cadets left the school for countries such as Russia, Ukraine and Belarus. It was reformed in 1993, as the Military Institute of the National Security Committee of Kazakhstan, and the Military Institute of the Border Troops. It became the Border Troops Academy and by order of President Nursultan Nazarbayev on 13 March 2012, it was renamed a final time.

== Awards ==
- 30 April 1975 — Order of the Red Banner
- 26 December 1981 — Order of the October Revolution

== Commandants ==
- Divisional commander Eduard Kraft (1931-1933)
- Brigade commander Ernest Lepin (1933-1938)
- Colonel B. Yakhnin (1938-1939)
- Colonel J. Levinson (1939-1943)
- Major General I. Ukhov (1943-1944)
- Colonel Sergey Antonov (1944-1954)
- Colonel Grigory Baranov (1954-1960)
- Colonel Pyotr Kuzmin (1960-1962)
- Major General Pavel Kursky (1962-25 April 1968)
- Major General Viktor Lyubin (25 April 1968 – 21 July 1969)
- Major General Grigory Zabolotny (21 July 1969-January 1976)
- Lieutenant General Matvey Merkulov (January 1976-20 July 1985)
- Lieutenant General Ivan Karpov (20 July 1985 – 6 March 1987)
- Major General Vladimir Pasheev (6 March 1987 – 7 April 1990)
- Major General Nikolai Lukashevich (7 April 1990 – 1992)
- Colonel Pyotr Taratuta (1992-1993)
- Major General Nurgali Asylov (1993-1997)
- Major General Tursun Ayzhulov (1997-1998)
- Major General Nurlan Dzhulananov (1998-1999)
- Major General Marat Mazhitov (1999-2000)
- Major General Erbolat Shokaev (2000-2005)
- Major General Bauyrzhan Elubaev (2005-2009)
- Major General Talgat Esetov (2009—2010)
- Major General Abdrazak Ilyasov (2010-2011)
- Major General Talgat Esetov (2011—2013)
- Colonel Pavel Polivanov (since 2014)

== Notable Alummi ==
- Viktor Trufanov – Head of the Coast Guard Department of the Border Service of the Federal Security Service of Russia (2006-2011)
- Valeriy Hubenko – The first Head of the State Border Guard Service of Ukraine (1991-1994)

== See also ==
- Military Institute of the Kazakh Ground Forces
- Border Troops Academy
- Border Guard Service Institute of Belarus
