= Kazakhstan Engineering =

Kazakhstan's Government Owned Company

JSC National Company Kazakhstan Engineering
- Native name: Kazakh: Казахстан инжиниринг ұлттық компаниясы АҚ; Qazaqstan injiniring ūlttyq kompaniasy AQ; Russian: АО Национальная компания Казахстан инжиниринг
- Type: State-owned enterprise
- Traded as: KASE: KZEN
- ISIN: KZ2C00006674
- Industry: defense
- Founded: March 13, 2003; 23 years ago
- Headquarters: Astana, Kazakhstan
- Area served: Central Asia
- Key people: Adlbek Sarsembayev (CEO 2020-2021); Temirzhan Abdrakhmanov (CEO 2022 until now)
- Products: Munitions, Small arms, Artillery, Explosives, Combat vehicle, Warship, Civil and military aerospace, Electro-optical devices
- Owner: Ministry of Industry and Infrastructure Development
- Number of employees: ≈6000
- Website: www.ke.kz

Kazakhstan Engineering (Kazakh: Қазақстан инжиниринг, Qazaqstandyq injiniring) is a defense industry complex established by the Kazakhstan government to unite Kazakhstan's state owned defence industry companies. The headquarters of this group is in Astana.

JSC National Company Kazakhstan Engineering (Kazakhstan Engineering) was established in accordance with the Decree of the Government of the Republic of Kazakhstan dated March 13, 2003 No. 244 “On Certain Issues of the Military-Industrial Complex of the Republic of Kazakhstan” in order to improve the management system of the country's defense-industrial complex, by incorporating defense industry enterprises and military factories of the Ministry of Defense of the Republic of Kazakhstan into the Company.

In October 2006, the state block of shares of the Company (100%) was transferred in payment of the authorized capital of Samruk Holding JSC.

In September 2009, a stake in the Company was transferred to the Ministry of Industry and Trade of the Republic of Kazakhstan for trust.

In June 2010, in order to improve the management system of the defense industry of the Republic of Kazakhstan, the stake in the Company was transferred to the Ministry of Defense of the Republic of Kazakhstan for trust.

In December 2016, a stake in the Company was transferred to the Ministry of Defense and Aerospace Industry of the Republic of Kazakhstan for trust management.

In accordance with the Decree of the Government of the Republic of Kazakhstan dated July 3, 2018 No. 405 “On Certain Issues of the Joint Stock Company“ National Company Kazakhstan Engineering ”, the block of shares of the Company was transferred to state ownership, the tenure of which was vested in the Ministry of Digital Development, defense and aerospace industry of the Republic of Kazakhstan.

In accordance with the Decree of the Government of the Republic of Kazakhstan dated July 12, 2019 No. 501 “On measures to implement the Decree of the President of the Republic of Kazakhstan dated June 17, 2019 No. 24“ On measures to further improve the public administration system of the Republic of Kazakhstan ”, the right to own and use the state block of shares of the Company transferred to the Ministry of Industry and Infrastructure Development of the Republic of Kazakhstan.

Strategic planning is organized taking into account the tasks that the state sets for the military-industrial complex, as well as taking into account documents of state planning of a higher level, in particular, the Development Strategy of Kazakhstan, the National Development Plan of the Republic of Kazakhstan and other important documents. The main directions of the Company's strategic development are set out in the Company's Development Plan for 2020-2029, approved by the Decree of the Government of the Republic of Kazakhstan dated December 25, 2019 No. 969.
