= Talgat Bigeldinov Military Institute of the Air Defence Forces =

Kazakhstan military academy

Coordinates: 50.28607°N 57.15100°E

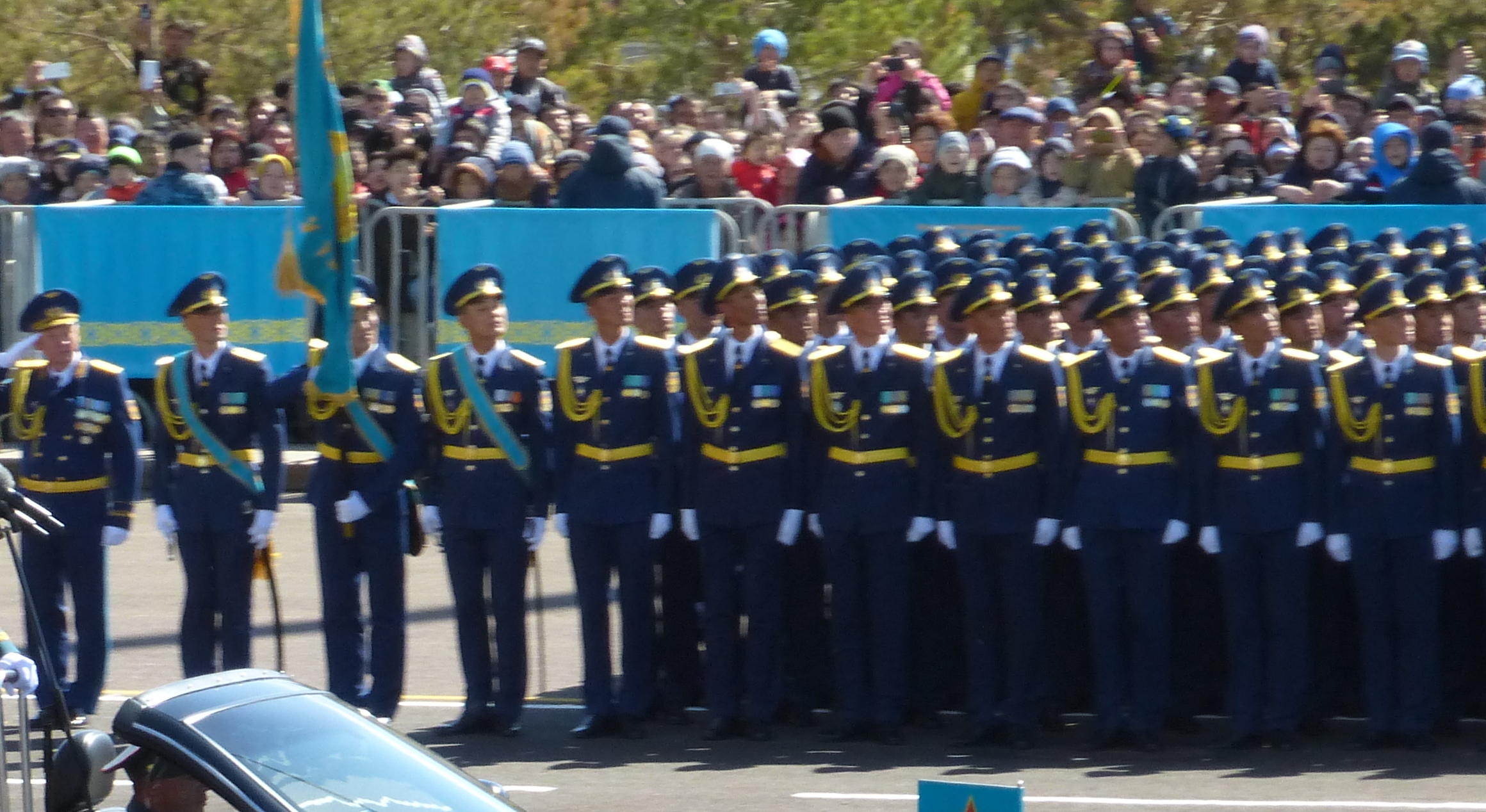
The academy on parade.

The Talgat Bigeldinov Military Institute of the Air Defence Forces (Kazakh: Кеңес Одағының екі мәрте Батыры Т.Я.Бигелдинов атындағы Әуе қорғаныс күштерінің Әскери институты, romanized: Keñes Odağynyñ ekı märte Batyry T.İA.Bigeldinov atyndağy Äue qorğanys küşterınıñ Äskeri instituty; Russian: Военный институт Сил воздушной обороны имени Т. Я. Бегельдинова, ВИСВО) is a specialized military academy which helps train future servicemen of the Kazakh Air Defense Forces. Established in 1974 as the Aktobe Higher Civil Aviation School (AVLUGA), it originally trained specialists (mainly pilots) in the field of aviation. Until 1996, the AVLUGA served under this name and was renamed after the only two-time Kazakh Hero of the Soviet Union Talgat Begeldinov in July 2003. As of 2013, the institute has produced over 160 lieutenants in the air defence forces, and has trained cadets from foreign countries such as Hungary and Afghanistan.
