= Kazakh Air Defense Forces =

Aviation forces of Kazakhstan

Kazakh Air Defence Forces
- Қазақстан Республикасының Әуе қорғаныс күштері (Kazakh); Силы воздушной обороны Республики Казахстан (Russian)
- Emblem of the Kazakh Air Defence Forces
- Founded: 1 June 1998; 28 years ago
- Country: Kazakhstan
- Type: Air force
- Role: Aerial defence; Aerial warfare
- Size: 12,000 airmen, 229 aircraft
- Part of: Armed Forces of the Republic of Kazakhstan
- Headquarters: Astana
- Colours
- Anniversaries: 7 May (Defender of the Fatherland Day); 18 August (Aviation Day)
- Equipment: Ground Master 400, S-300, S-200, S-125, S-75, Buk-2ME

Commanders
- Supreme Commander-in-Chief: President Kassym-Jomart Tokayev
- Commander-in-Chief of the Air Defense Forces: Major General Kairat Sadykov

Insignia
- Roundel

- Flag

Aircraft flown
- Attack: Su-25
- Fighter: Su-27, Su-30SM
- Helicopter: Mil Mi-8, Mil Mi-17, Mil Mi-26, Bell UH-1, Eurocopter EC145
- Attack helicopter: Mil Mi-24, Mil Mi-35
- Reconnaissance: CAIG Wing Loong, TAI Anka
- Trainer: Aero L-39, Zlín Z 42, Airbus A400
- Transport: An-12, An-24, An-26, An-30, An-72, An-74, EADS CASA C-295, Let L-410 Turbolet, Shaanxi Y-8, Tupolev Tu-134, Tupolev Tu-154, Airbus A400

The Kazakh Air Defense Forces (Note: Kazakh: Қазақстан Әуе қорғаныс күштері, romanized: Qazaqstan Äwe qorğanys küşterı, pronounced [qʰɑzɑqstʰɑ́n æɥé qʰorʁɑnə̆s kʰʉ̆ʃtʰɵrɘ́]; Russian: Силы воздушной обороны Казахстана, romanized: Sily vozdushnoy oborony Kazakhstana, pronounced [ˈsʲilɨ vɐzˈduʂnəj ɐbɐˈronɨ kəzɐxˈstanə]) is the aerial warfare branch of the Armed Forces of the Republic of Kazakhstan. Their responsibilities include protecting Kazakh airspace, as well as combat missions in support of other branches of the armed forces. The official holiday of the air forces is Aviation Day on August 18.

The Talgat Bigeldinov Military Institute of the Air Defence Forces serves as the only educational/training institution of the air force, having trained cadets from foreign countries including Hungary, Kyrgyzstan and Afghanistan.

== History ==
=== Soviet era ===
In the first formation of the Central Asian Military District, it operated a Soviet Air Force district branch led by Major General M.P. Kharitonov. It operated in the early to mid-40s during the Second World War, and consisted of air brigades based on the territory of the Kazakh SSR. The Central Asian Military District was reinstated in 1969 in relation with the increased hostility between the USSR and the People's Republic of China, by splitting the territories of the Kazakh SSR, Kyrgyzstan SSR and the Tajik SSR from the Turkestan Military District. The 73rd Air Army provided all air support for the district, being known as the Air Forces of the Central Asian Military District from 1980 to 1988. Air defence was also provided by the 12th and 14th Air Defence Armies. In 1989 the military district was disbanded, being merged back into the Turkestan MD. This led to the amalgamation of the 73rd Air Army into the 49th Air Army of the TurkMD. The new air army inherited the headquarters of the 49th, but has taken the designation of the 73rd, so while air force units were nominally still subordinated to the 73rd AA, this was not one of the CAMD with its HQ in Almaty, but another formation with its HQ in Tashkent.

=== Post-independence ===
At the time of the declaration of the independence of Kazakhstan and the dissolution of the Soviet Union, the 24th Fighter-Bomber Aviation Division, as well as three other separate air regiments, were stationed in the country. On May 7, 1992, a meeting was held in Almaty between Russian and Kazakh government representatives and an agreement was reached for the transfer of all units and formations of the Turkestan Military District, to the authority of Kazakhstan. On the same day President Nursultan Nazarbayev signed a decree for the transformation of the State Committee of Defence of the Republic of Kazakhstan into the Ministry of Defence, and for the creation of the Armed Forces of the Republic of Kazakhstan. For the Air Force this included the following units:

- from the 73rd Air Army (73-я Воздушная армия):
  - 11th Guards Dnepropetrovskaya, awarded the Order of the Red Banner and the Order of Bogdan Khmelnytskiy Mixed Aviation Division (11-я гвардейская Днепропетровская Краснознамённая ордена Богдана Хмельницкого смешанная авиационная дивизия) (redesignated in 1989 from its previous designation as the 24th Fighter-Bomber Aviation Division (24-я ибад))
    - 129th Fighter-Bomber Aviation Regiment (129-й истребительно-бомбардировочный авиационный полк) in Taldy Kurgan, flying the MiG-27
    - 134th Aviation Regiment of Fighter-Bombers in Zhangiztobe, Zharma District, Semipalatinsk Oblast/Abai Region, flying the MiG-27 (disbanded 1993)
    - 149th Guards Bomber Aviation Regiment (149-й гвардейский бомбардировочный авиационный полк) in Nikolayevka (Zhetigen), flying the Su-24
    - 905th Fighter Aviation Regiment (905-й истребительный авиационный полк) in Taldy Kurgan, flying the MiG-23MLD
  - Separate aviation regiments and squadrons:
    - 27th Guards Vyborgskiy Red Banner Fighter Aviation Regiment (27-й гвардейский Выборгский Краснознамённый истребительный авиационный полк) in Ucharal, flying MiG-23 and MiG-21 (eventually disbanded in 1992)
    - 39th Separate Reconnaissance Nikopolksiy, awarded the Order of Alexander Nevsky Aviation Regiment (39-й отдельный разведывательный Никопольский ордена Александра Невского авиационный полк) in Balkhash, flying MiG-25RB and Yak-28R
    - 457th Separate Mixed Aviation Regiment (457-й отдельный смешанный авиационный полк) in Almaty, flying An-12, An-26 and Mi-8T
    - 157th Separate Transport and Combat Helicopter Regiment (157-й отдельный транспортно-боевой вертолетный полк) in Taraz, flying Мi-26, Mi-6 and Mi-8
    - 486th Separate Helicopter Regiment (486-й отдельный вертолётный полк) in Ucharal, flying Mi-24 and Mi-8
    - 281st Separate Mixed Helicopter Squadron (281-я отдельная смешанная авиационная эскадрилья) in Almaty, flying Mi-6 and Mi-8
- from the 5th Central Courses for Conversion and Development of Flying Personnel (5-е Центральные курсы по подготовке и усовершенствованию авиационных кадров (5 ЦК ПУАК)), a training air division under Air Force High Command, consisted of four aircraft and one helicopter training aviation regiment, HQ in Frunze (Kyrgyz SSR),
  - 715th Training Aviation Regiment (715-й учебный авиационный полк) in Lugovaya, flying MiG-29 and L-39

The territory of the Kazakh SSR was provided air defence by two separate armies of the Air Defence Forces and the Kazakh military took control of their Kazakhstan-based assets:

- from the 14th Independent Air Defence Army which had its HQ in Novosibirsk and provided air defence cover over the central regions of the USSR, spanning from the Arctic Ocean to the Kazakh steppe):
  - 56th Corps of Air Defence (56-й корпус ПВО, HQ in Semipalatinsk) (3 of its regiments were transferred to the Russian military and re-located to Russian territory):
    - 356th Fighter Aviation Regiment of Air Defence (356-й иап ПВО) at Semipalatinsk Airport, flying the Mikoyan MiG-31
    - 120th Missile Air Defence Regiment (120-й зрп) in Semipalatinsk (Chagan village)
    - 374th Guards Missile Air Defence Regiment (374-й гвзрп) in Serebryanоk
    - 770th Missile Air Defence Regiment (770-й зрп) in Georgievka
    - 17th Radio-Technical Regiment (17-й ртп) in Semipalatinsk
- from the 12th Independent Air Defense Army (12-я отдельная армия ПВО), had its HQ in Tashkent, Uzbek SSR and provided air defence for the Central Asian Soviet republics and the forces of the Turkestan Military District):
  - 37th Corps of Air Defence (37-й корпус ПВО, HQ in Almaty) (1 radio-technical brigade on Kyrgyz territory transferred to the Kyrgyz military):
    - 87th Missile Air Defence Brigade (87-я зрбр) in Almaty
    - 420th Missile Air Defence Regiment (420-й зрп) in Karaganda
    - 561st Guards Missile Air Defence Regiment (561-й гвзрп) in Shevchenko
    - 769th Guards Missile Air Defence Regiment (769-й гвзрп) in Baikonur
    - 1022nd Missile Air Defence Regiment (1022-й зрп) in Sary-Shagan (the former 51st Missile Air Defence Brigade)
    - 42nd Radio-Technical Brigade (42-я ртбр) in Almaty

The Armed Forces of the Republic of Kazakhstan have also inherited an army aviation unit.

- from the 32nd Combined Arms Red Banner Army (32-я общевойсковая Краснознамённая армия, HQ in Semipalatinsk):
  - 450th Separate Helicopter Regiment (450-й отдельный вертолётный полк) in Ucharal

Directly subordinated to the General Staff of the Armed Forces of the USSR:

- 27th Separate Helicopter Squadron (27-я отдельная вертолётная эскадрилья) in Semipalatinsk, providing air support to the Semipalatinsk Test Site

The air defence and the army aviation units were kept separate from the air force, but by the time the Kazakhstan Air Defence Forces were established on 1 June 1998 they were merged into it.

By late 1993 the small Kazakh Air Force consisted of a six regiments as well as an air defence fighter regiment.

It included the following units:

- 11th Division
  - 129th Fighter-Bomber Regiment (Taldy Kurgan)
  - 134th Fighter-Bomber Regiment (Zhangiztobe)
  - 149th Bomber Regiment (Zhetigen/Nikolayevka)
- 715th Fighter Regiment (Lugovaya)
- 39th Reconnaissance Regiment (Balkhash Airport)
- 486th Helicopter Regiment (Ucharal)
- 356th Fighter Aviation Regiment (Semipalatinsk), led notably by Major General Aliy Petrovich Volkov

=== Creation of Kazakh Air Defence Forces ===
On 17 November 1997, President Nursultan Nazarbayev issued a decree titled "On Further Measures for Reforming the Armed Forces of the Republic of Kazakhstan". As instructed by this, on 1 April 1998, Minister of Defense Sagadat Nurmagambetov, announced the creation of the Air Defense Forces of the Armed Forces, with the first day of operation being 1 June 1998. On 17 April 2008, the Commander-in-Chief of the Air Defense Forces announced August 18 would be celebrated as 'Aviation Day.'

In November 2007, Kazakhstan signed an agreement with Belarus, under which 10 Soviet-made Su-27 fighters were modernised at an aircraft repair plant in Baranavichy, designated for the Kazakh Air Defence Forces. In 2008, EADS agreed titanium sourcing agreements with Kazakh suppliers. On 28 October 2010, Eurocopter created a 50/50 joint venture with Kazakhstan Engineering, under which 45 Eurocopter EC145s would be assembled locally for government use. The first of six EC145s ordered by the Kazakh Ministries of Defence and Emergencies was delivered in November 2011.

In early January 2012, Airbus Military and the state-owned Kazspecexport defence company, signed a contract to deliver two EADS CASA C-295 military transport aircraft, and a Memorandum of Understanding for another six aircraft, which were to be delivered over the course of the following year. In May 2012, Kazakhstan announced its intent to acquire 20 Eurocopter EC725 helicopters that were to be assembled in Astana by officials from Kazakhstan Engineering and fitted by the Turkish firm Aselsan.

== Aircraft ==
=== Current inventory ===
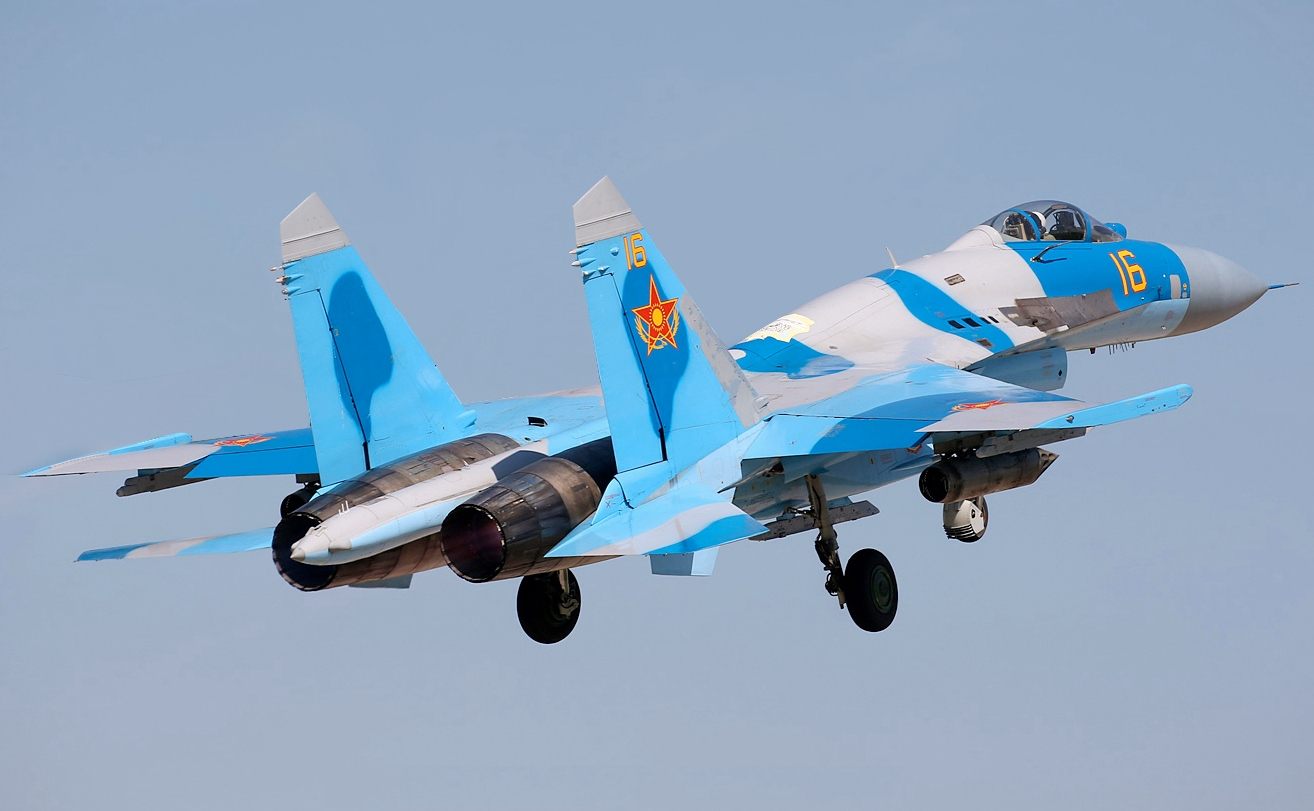
A Kazakh Sukhoi Su-27 on takeoff

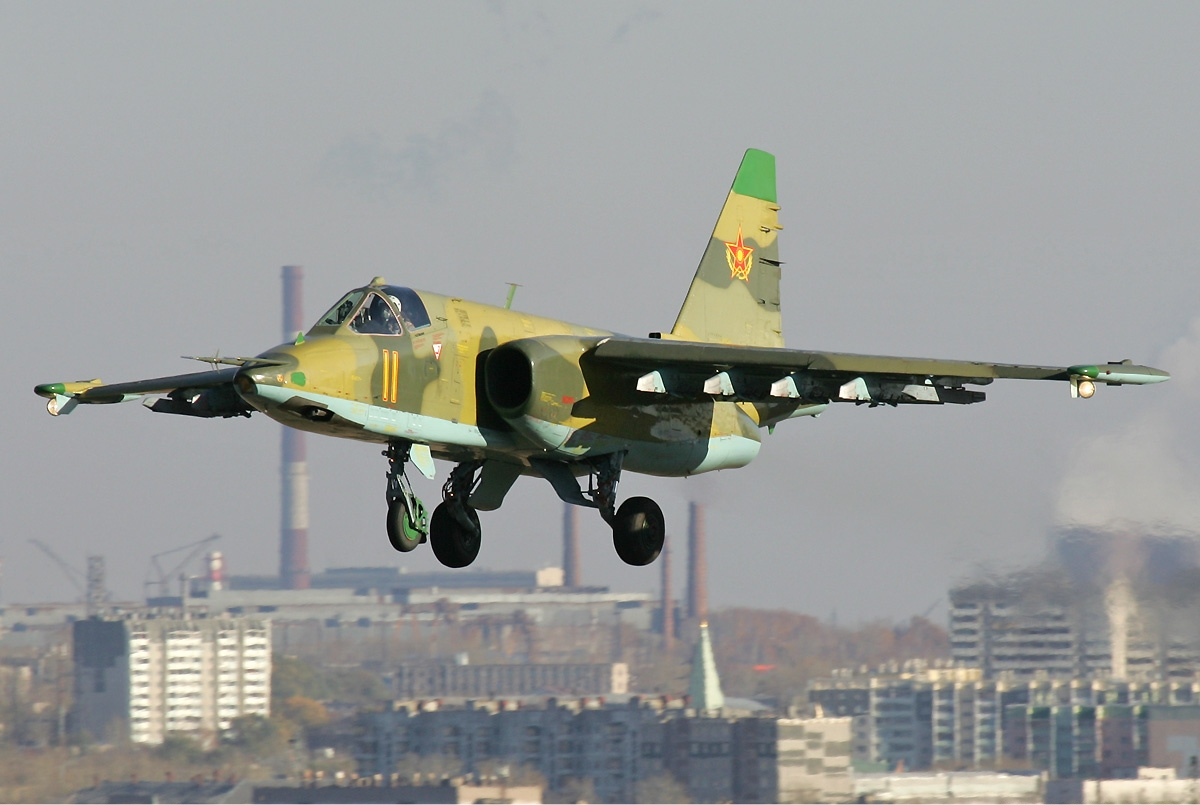
A Kazakh Su-25

Mig-29(23)

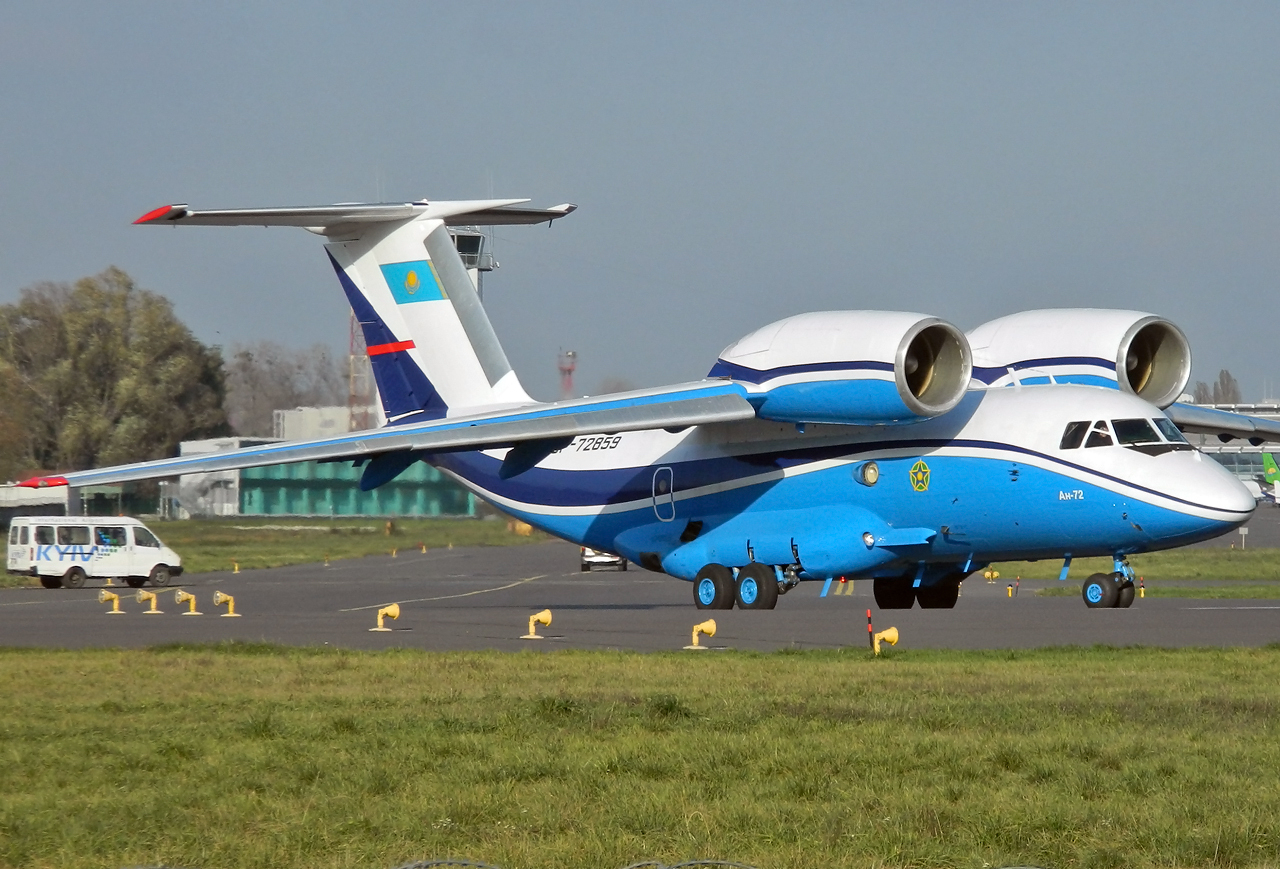
An Antonov An-72 of the Kazakh Air Force

Aircraft	Origin	Type	Variant	In service	Notes
Combat aircraft
Sukhoi Su-27	Russia	Air superiority / Multirole	Su-27 / Su-27UB	20 / 4	4 UBs provide conversion training
Sukhoi Su-30	Russia	Air superiority / Multirole	Su-30SM	36	
Sukhoi Su-25	Soviet Union	Attack	Su-25SM / Su-25UBM	12 / 2	2 UBs provide conversion training
Transport
Airbus A400M Atlas	Multinational	Heavy transport		1	2 on order.
Airbus C295	Spain	Transport	C-295M/W	9	
Antonov An-12	Soviet Union/ Ukraine	Heavy transport		2	
Antonov An-26	Soviet Union/ Ukraine	Transport		6	
Antonov An-72	Soviet Union/ Ukraine	Heavy transport		2	STOL capable aircraft.
Tupolev Tu-154	Soviet Union	Transport		1	
Tupolev Tu-134	Soviet Union	Transport		1	
Antonov An-30	Soviet Union/ Ukraine	ISR / Transport		1	
Let L-410 Turbolet	Czechoslovakia/Czech Republic	Transport		8	4 on order.
Helicopters
Bell UH-1	United States	Utility	UH-1H	4	
Mil Mi-8	Soviet Union/Russia	Utility	Mi-8T / Mi-8TV	10	
Mil Mi-17	Russia	Utility	Mi-17V-5 / Mi-171Sh	20 / 6	
Mil Mi-24	Soviet Union	Attack	Mi-24V	20	
Mil Mi-35	Russia	Attack	Mi-35SM	12	
Mil Mi-26	Russia	Heavy lift / Transport		4	
Eurocopter EC145	France/ Kazakhstan	Utility		20+	45+ explicitly on order.
Trainer aircraft
Aero L-39 Albatros	Czechoslovakia	Jet trainer		19	
Zlín Z 42	Czechoslovakia/Czech Republic	Basic trainer	Z 242L	2	
UAVs
CAIG Wing Loong	China	MALE UCAV		3	
TAI Anka	Turkey	UCAV		4	

In April 2024, it was reported that the US had acquired 81 obsolete Soviet-era combat aircraft from Kazakhstan, including MiG-31 interceptors, MiG-27 fighter bombers, MiG-29 fighters, and Su-24 bombers, for $2.26 million, equalling an average price of each plane of $19,300. It is likely they will be transferred to the Ukrainian Air Force, for use as a source of spare parts. In a later statement, the Kazakh state-owned weapons importer and exporter Kazspetexport denied such claims, saying that foreign companies were not allowed to bid.

== Structure ==
The Air Defense Forces of Kazakhstan consists of the following:

- Air Force
- Anti-Aircraft Defense Unit
- Direct Subordination Unit
- Parachute Training Center
- Air Traffic Control Unit

The Kazakh Air Defense Forces has four jet bases:

- 600th Guards Air Base (Zhetigen, Nikolayevka, Almaty)
- 602nd Air Base (Şymkent)
- 604th Air Base (Taldyqorğan Airport)
- 610th Air Base (Sary-Arka Airport, Karaganda)

== Commanders ==
=== Commanders of the Air Force ===
Commander of the Air Force position didn't exist in the Kazakh Air Defense Forces until 2011. Before 2011, such position was called "Chief of the Main Directorate of the Air Force", who was a straight deputy of the Commander-in-Chief.

Name	Term start	Term end	Notes
Alsay Jumanov	16 February 2011	5 July 2013	
Dauren Kossanov	5 July 2013	21 September 2019	
Nurbolat Topayev	21 September 2019	26 September 2022	
Ruslan Kunurov	26 September 2022	15 July 2025	
Askar Izbassov	15 July 2025	Incumbent	
