= Otar =

Otar may refer to:

- Otar (name), a Georgian given name
- Otar (village), Zhambyl Region, Kazakhstan
  - Otar Military Base, a military installation near the village
- Over-the-air rekeying
- Otar I, Duchy of Aragvi (1660–1666)

== See also ==
- Otari (disambiguation)
- Otaru
