= Military Band Service (Kazakhstan) =

Military music service

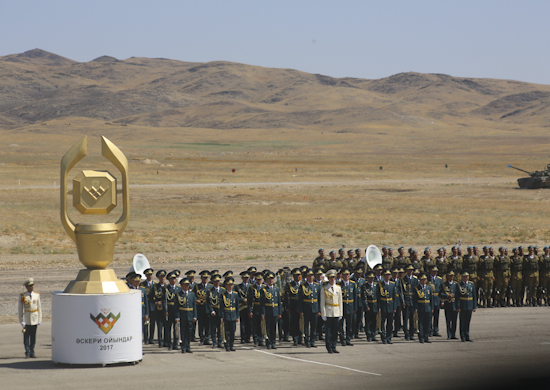
The Central Military Band of the Ministry of Defense of Kazakhstan in 2017.

The Military Band Service of the Armed Forces of Kazakhstan (MBS-AFK) (Kazakh: Қазақстан Республикасы Қарулы Күштерінің әскери оркестрі қызметі, Qazaqstan Respublikasy Qaruly Küşterınıñ äskeri orkestrı qyzmetı; Russian: Военный Оркестр Службы Вооруженных Сил Республики Казахстан) is a musical department of the General Staff of the Armed Forces of Kazakhstan, which is responsible for the organization of military bands in the armed forces. It oversees the development of all the bands of the Kazakh Armed Forces, as well as provides training and guidance to these bands in their activities. The purpose of military bands in the Kazakh Armed Forces is to build patriotism in the military and improve the morale of the troops through the playing of cultural and national songs. The military band service is based on the HQ Band of the Central Asian Military District, which served the area of the Kazakh SSR in the Soviet era. The Central Band of the Ministry of Defense. Most of the leadership in the service also work in the State Wind Orchestra of Republic of Kazakhstan.

== Constituent bands ==
The following 22 bands make up the MBS-AFK:

- Central Military Band of the Ministry of Defense of Kazakhstan
- Presidential Band of the State Security Service of the Republic of Kazakhstan (formerly the Band of the Republican Guard)
- Band of the National Military Patriotic Center of the Armed Forces of Kazakhstan
- Corps of Drums of the Astana Zhas Ulan Republican School
- Bands of the Kazakh Ground Forces
  - Band of the Military Institute of the Kazakh Ground Forces
  - Band of the Regional Command "Astana"
  - Band of the Regional Command "East"
  - Band of the Regional Command "West"
  - Band of the Regional Command "South"
- Military Band Service of the National Guard of Kazakhstan
  - Central Band of the National Guard of the Republic of Kazakhstan
  - Band of the Military Institute of the National Guard
  - Regional Command "Central"
  - Regional Command "South"
  - Regional Command "West"
  - Regional Command "East"
- Band of the Talgat Bigeldinov Military Institute of the Air Defence Forces
- Band of the Aktau Naval Institute
- Band of the Military Engineering Institute of Radio Electronics and Communications
- Bands of the Border Service of the National Security Committee of the Republic of Kazakhstan
  - Band of the Academy of the Border Service of the KNB
  - Band of Military Unit 2201 "A" (part of the KNB's maritime branch)
- Bands of the Committee for Emergency Situations of Kazakhstan
  - Band of Civil Defense
  - Band of the Kokshetau Technical Institute of the MVD

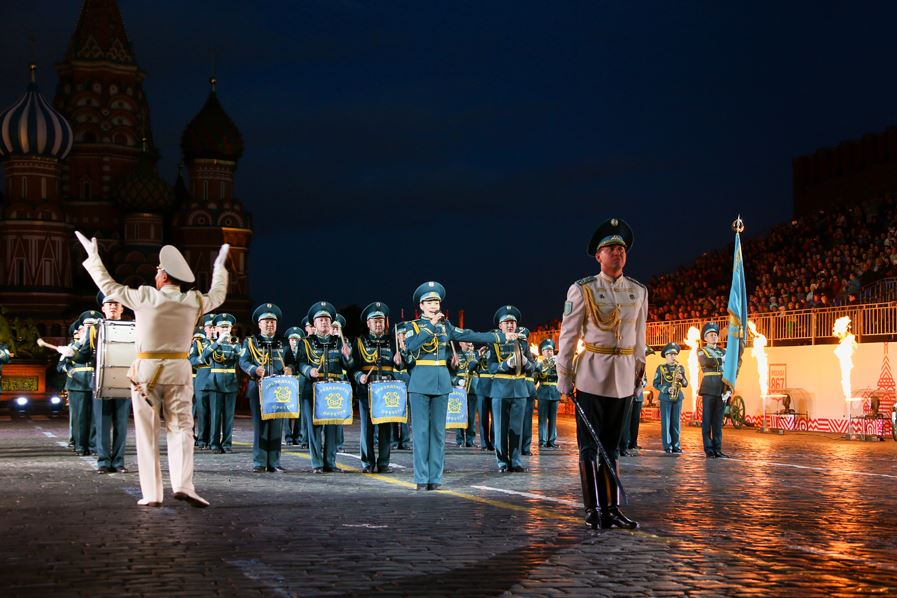
The Band of the Republican Guard performing in Moscow.

=== Presidential Band ===
The Presidential Band is a ceremonial unit that operates under the auspices of the State Security Service of Kazakhstan. It performs for all state functions, especially those concerning the President of Kazakhstan. From 1992 to 2014, it was known as the Band of the Republican Guard. It is known in part due to its turquoise and white full dress uniforms.

=== Central Band of the Ministry of Defense ===
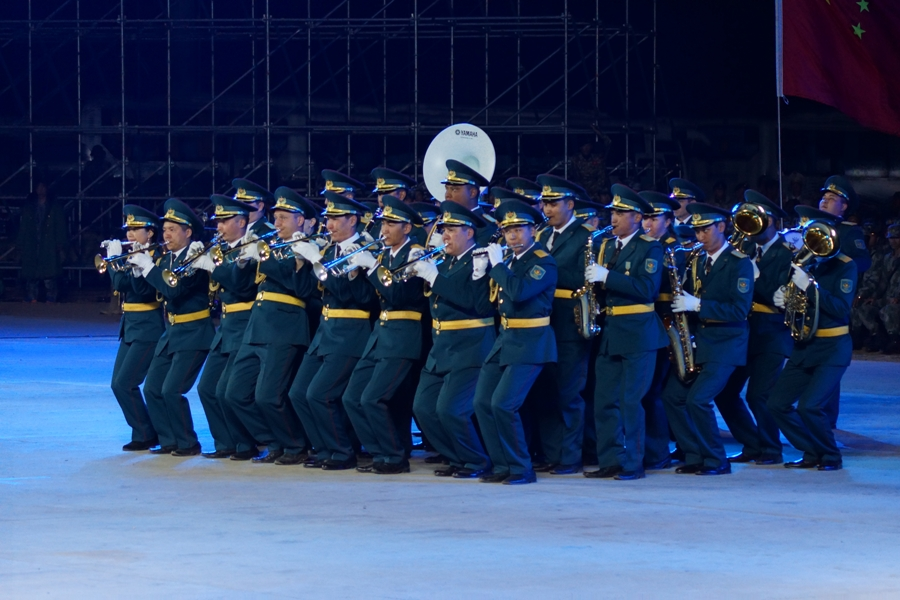
The Band of the Ministry of Defense performing in August 2014.

The Central Band of the Ministry of Defense is the main operational musical unit of the armed forces. Founded in 1995 in Almaty, it was transferred to Astana in 2012. It provides musical accompaniment for all operational public duties at the Defense Ministry and at all military units in the capital.

=== Band Center of the National Guard ===
The organization of special training and the application in the performance of military bands of the National Guard of Kazakhstan (formerly the Internal Troops of Kazakhstan) is the Military Band Center of the National Guard. Lieutenant Colonel Askhat Mukhamedyarov has served as the Senior Director of Music since December 2010. He was preceded in this position by Major B. Stasiv, Major A. Butin and Colonel P. Snagovsky.

==== Central Band of the National Guard ====
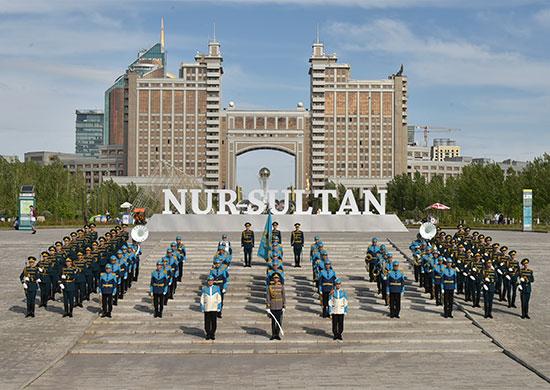
The Central Band of the National Guard

The Exemplary Band of the National Guard of the Republic of Kazakhstan is a public duties unit that carries out activities on behalf of the National Guard of Kazakhstan and formerly the Internal Troops of Kazakhstan. The band wears a dark and light blue full dress uniform.

==== Band of the Regional Command of the National Guard "Central" ====
Based in Karaganda, the band serves the entire Karaganda Region, consisting of 20 musicians. In July 2019, it took part in the Festival of Brass Bands "Astana Samaly" for the first time. It has also taken part in the Eskeri Kernei ("Military Trumpet") International Festival.

==== Band of the Regional Command of the National Guard "South" ====
The band is a leading creative team in the Jambyl Region. It was formed in 1997 and performed for the first time on 16 March 1999 at the grounds of military unit 5513. The first director was Major Sergey Makeev while the band is currently led by Senior Lieutenant Alcon Azizov. It is the successor to the Military Band of Military Unit 5571 of the Internal Troops of Kazakhstan. One commander of that band, Major Elena Evstratenko, was at the time the only female bandmaster in the country.

=== Band of the Kokshetau Technical Institute ===
A brass band is organized among 15 of the most trained students in the Kokshetau Technical Institute. On a weekly basis, the band performs for all arriving cadets at the KTI as well as for the faculty. In recent years, the staff at the Department of Emergency Situations of the East Kazakhstan Region have sponsored the acquisition of instruments for the band.

== Commanders ==
- Colonel Alexander Belyakov (1994—2012)
- Major Timur Dzhartibayev (circa 2012-circa 2020)
- Lieutenant Colonel Almas Ibragimov (circa 2020-present)

== Notable Kazakh bandsmen ==
- Batyrkhan Shukenov
- Alexey Kutunov, rector of the Zhurgenov Kazakh National Academy of Arts.
- Murat Chalaala, chief conductor of the Astana Symphony Orchestra.
- Arystanbek Mukhamediuly, former Minister of Culture and Sports and director of the Presidential Band from 1997 to 2001.
