= Battle Parade =

Military parades in Kazakhstan

The Armed Forces of Kazakhstan holds Battle Parades (Russian: Боевой парад) every couple of years on 7 May, which is Defender of the Fatherland Day in Kazakhstan. Unlike the precedent set by the Soviet Army with its parades in Moscow, Battle Parades are used to project military strength and technology. So far, only two of these kinds of parades have been held; one in 2013 and one 2018.

== Concept ==
Battle parades include tactical exercises and military demonstrations. They are generally held at the Matybulak Training Ground on the 40th Otar Military Base in the Korday District of the Jambyl Region. The base is where many enlisted soldiers undergo basic training as well as where military festivals take place. Notably, the parade participants wear full combat gear rather than a ceremonial full dress uniform that is traditional for military parades. The uniform, as well as all aspects of the parade are based in non-ceremonial military features such as the following:

- The parade commander giving orders from a Turkish-made Otokar Cobra instead of a 2003 Lincoln Town Car.
- Leaders such as the President of Kazakhstan and the Minister of Defense wear full battle dress.
- All the gear that is usually worn during any type modern warfare is worn for the parade.
- The flypast includes aircraft live fire demonstrations.
- An exhibition of military equipment is usually unveiled.

Keeping in tradition, the use of a cadet corps of drums from the Astana Zhas Ulan Republican School and a military band from the Defence Ministry is also available. According to Roger McDermott, an analyst at the Jamestown Foundation, the parade is held as a signal that the Government of Kazakhstan will take steps to modernize its military to meet the "high technologies and standards of the 21st century". An organizational group composed of officers from various branches are usually tasked to coordinate the live fire aspects of the parade.

== Implementation ==
=== Order of events ===
The parade begins with the arrival of the President of Kazakhstan in his government helicopter accompanied by the defence minister. Prior to this, the Flag of Kazakhstan is posted at the head of the parade by a three-man color guard. Once they land, they are received by the Chief of the General Staff, who gives them the report on the parade's status. They then inspect a guard of honour provided by the Honor Guard Company of the Ministry of Defense of Kazakhstan to the tune of the presidential fanfare. At around this time, an artillery salute is sounded. When the president arrives at the saluting podium, he/he receives the report from the parade commander (usually the Commander in Chief of the Kazakh Ground Forces). They then greet the troops who respond back in unison before listening for the presidential address to the country's troops and war veterans. At the conclusion of the speech, the president yells "Ura" to which the entire parade repeats three times before standing at attention for a rendition of Meniń Qazaqstanym as performed by the Central Military Band of the Ministry of Defense. The parade will then get organized for a march past. The parade involves officers and personnel of the Kazakh Ground Forces, Air Defense Forces, Naval Forces, State Security Service, the Border Service, the National Guard, the Committee for Emergency Situations and the Territorial Troops. After the marching portion, units from all branches participate in a fire attack on a conditional enemy: missile and artillery; aviation; tank and motorized rifle; air assault and parachute assault.

=== The first parade ===
The parade in 2013 was the first to celebrate holiday that was established just the year before. Specifically, it commemorated the 21st anniversary of the founding of the armed forces. It was the first to be held after the holiday was introduced the previous year. During the parade, Saule Aitpayeva was promoted to the rank of General, becoming first female general since Kazakhstan gained independence and one of the first female generals in Central Asia and the Commonwealth of Independent States. The ceremony also saw a live video stream being shown of a naval exercise in the Caspian Sea.

=== 2018 parade ===
This parade was held in honor of the armed force's 26th anniversary. During his holiday address, President Nazarbayev announced the creation of a new Special Operations Forces as well as a cyber warfare branch. He was accompanied at the parade by Defense Minister Saken Zhasuzakov.

== See also ==
- Military parades in Azerbaijan
- Kyiv Independence Day Parade
- Moscow Victory Day Parade
