= Sunkar (demonstration team) =

- Active: 2010 – Present
- Country: Kazakhstan
- Branch: Kazakh Air Defense Forces
- Role: Aerobatic flight display team
- Size: 6 Aircraft
- Base: 604th Air Base, Taldykorgan Airport
- Colours: Yellow, White, Blue

Aircraft flown
- Fighter: Aero L-39 Albatros

The Sunkar (Kazakh: Сұңқар; Russian: Сокол) is one of two aerobatic teams in the Kazakh Air Defense Forces which performs aerobatics during events in Kazakhstan from combat training Aero L-39 Albatros. In the Kazakh language, the name of the group is translated as "Falcon".

== History ==
The group was formed in the fall of 2010. At its disposal received six L-39 training aircraft. It gained fame at the International Exhibition of Arms and Military-Technical Equipment (KADEX) the following March in Astana. The culmination of the Defender of the Fatherland Day Battle Parade in 2018 and 2013 featured the team fly over 40th Otar Military Base. It has also demonstrated its skills during the celebrations of Air Force Day every year.
