= Band of the National Guard of the Republic of Kazakhstan =

Military band unit

- Қазақстан Ұлттық гвардиясының үлгілі оркестрі (Kazakh); Образцово-показательный оркестр Национальной гвардии Казахстана (Russian)
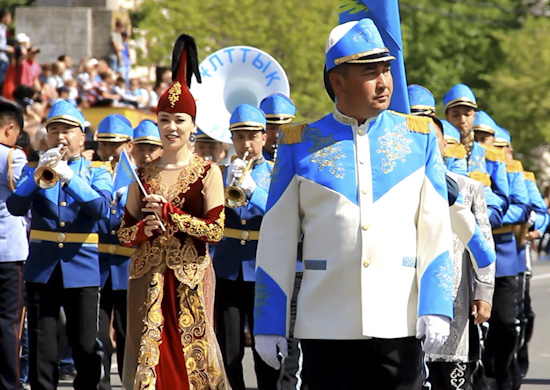
- Active: 1965; 61 years ago
- Country: Kazakhstan
- Branch: National Guard of Kazakhstan
- Type: Military Band
- Garrison/HQ: Astana
- Colors: Blue; White; Maroon

Commanders
- Senior Director of Music of the Military Band Center: Lieutenant Colonel Askhat Mukhamedyarov
- Director: Senior Lieutenant Torekhan Zhaudinov

Insignia
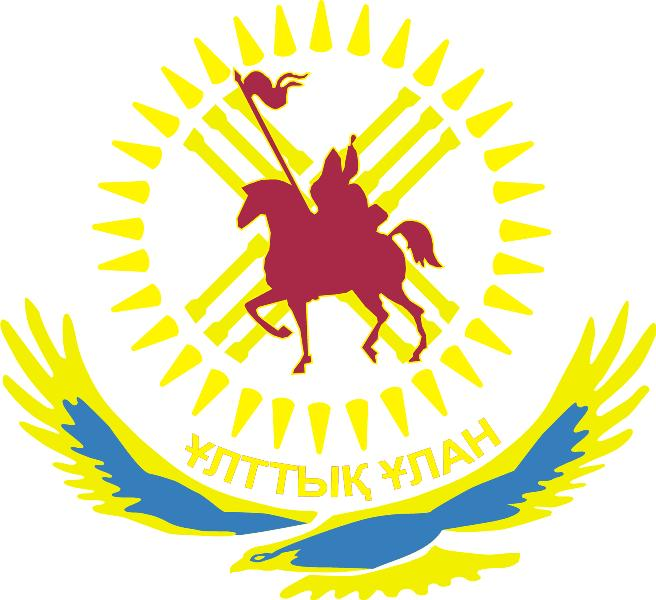
- Emblem of the National Guard

The Exemplary Band of the National Guard of the Republic of Kazakhstan (Kazakh: Қазақстан Республикасының Ұлттық гвардиясының үлгілі оркестрі, Qazaqstan Respublikasynyñ Ūlttyq gvardiasynyñ Ülgılı orkestrı; Russian: Образцово-показательный оркестр Национальной гвардии Республики Казахстан, Obraztsovo-pokazatelny orkestr Natsionalnoi gvardii Respubliki Kazakhstan) is a military music unit made for state ceremonies carried out by the National Guard of Kazakhstan.

== History ==
It was founded in 1965, as the band of the Internal Troops of the Kazakh SSR and is currently one of the leading musical groups of the Kazakh Armed Forces. Since its inception, the band has repeatedly performed military music on behalf of the Kazakh Internal Troops and the National Guard of Kazakhstan. The band is recognized notably for its dark and light blue uniform.

It has repeatedly taken part at various contests and festivals of military bands, including the International Festival of Brass Bands in St. Petersburg (12 June 2017) and the Shanghai Cooperation Organization Military Tattoo (2014–17). In 2015 and 2018, the band was invited to be a participant in The Amur Waves International Military Bands Festival. Furthermore, it performed at the 2019 Spasskaya Tower Festival.

== Organization ==
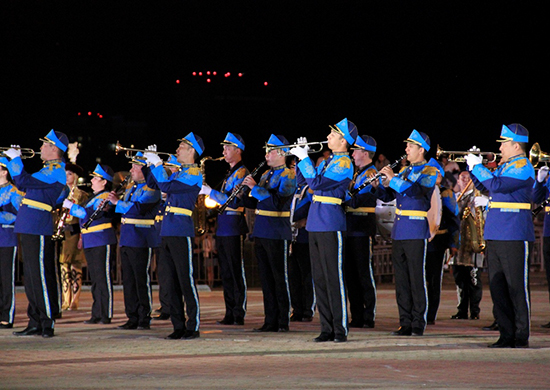
At the Amur Waves International Military Bands Festival.

Besides the central band, which is the seniormost of the bands of the National Guard, the band is also divided into the following sub-units:

- Band of the Military Institute of the National Guard
- Regional Command "Central" (based in Karaganda)
- Regional Command "South" (based in Almaty)
- Regional Command "West" (based in Oral)
- Regional Command "East" (based in Oskemen)

== See also ==
- National Guard of Kazakhstan
- Presidential Orchestra of the State Security Service of the Republic of Kazakhstan
- Central Military Band of the Ministry of Defense of Kazakhstan
- Military band
- Military Band Service (Kazakhstan)
