= Republican Guard (Kazakhstan) =

Special Forces of the State Security Service of Kazakhstan
- Kazakh: Қазақстан Республикасының МКҚ Айрықша мақсаттағы күштері Qazaqstan Respublikasynyñ MKQ Aıryqşa maqsattağy küşterı Russian: Силы особого назначения СГО Республики Казахстан
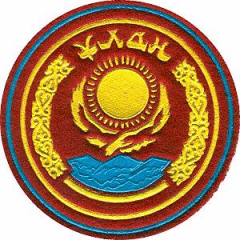
- Emblem of the former Republican Guard
- Active: 16 March 1992
- Country: Kazakhstan
- Allegiance: President of the Republic of Kazakhstan
- Branch: State Security Service of Kazakhstan
- Size: c. 2,000
- Part of: State Security Service
- Nickname: The Ulan Republican Guard
- Anniversaries: 16 March (Day of the Republican Guard)
- Website: Official site

Commanders
- President: Kassym-Jomart Tokayev
- Head of the SGO: Anuar Sadykulov
- Commander of the Special Forces of the SGO: Lieutenant General Mukhtar Ayubaev

The Special Forces of the State Security Service of Kazakhstan, also known commonly and formerly as the Republican Guard of Kazakhstan (Kazakh: Қазақстан Республикасының Республикалық ұланы, Qazaqstan Respublikasynyñ Respublikalyq ūlany; Russian: Республиканская гвардия Республики Казахстана, romanized: Respublikanskaya gvardiya Respubliki Kazakhstana), is a branch of the State Security Service of Kazakhstan. It was also a former independent service branches of the Armed Forces of the Republic of Kazakhstan. The former Republican Guard and the current Special Forces of the SGO is designed for protection and defense of residence of the President of Kazakhstan in Almaty and Nur-Sultan.

The Republican Guard was established on 16 March 1992, when President Nursultan Nazarbayev signed a decree on their creation on the basis of a separate brigade of operational designation of the Internal Troops deployed in the village of Kaskelen district of Almaty region.

== History ==
The Republican Guard was established on 16 March 1992, when the President of Kazakhstan signed a decree on their creation. Thus, the Day of the Republican Guard has been set as March 16. The Republican Guard was established on the basis of a separate brigade of operational designation of the Kazakh Internal Troops deployed in the village of Ak Zhar (located in the Kaskelen District of the Almaty Region). From the very beginning of its inception, it faced many difficulties such as a lack of resources and equipment as well as problems with the professional education of the troops. In August 1992, at the CSKA stadium in Almaty, President Nursultan Nazarbayev was first introduced to the Republican Guard in the person of a manned battalion of government protection, an honour guard and a military band. On 16 December 1992, Republican Guard conscripts were the first to be sworn in a ceremony at the Park of 28 Panfilov Guardsmen. Two weeks later, on the day before New Year's Eve, the Republican Guard accepted the role of round-the-clock personal security at the Almaty Presidential Residence, which was then under construction.

On 22 February 1993, the standards of the State Flag and the State Emblem of Kazakhstan at the Palace of the Republic were given 24-hour protection by the guard. That spring, designer Serik Suleimenov developed a uniform for servicemen of the honour guard company, for officers the introduction of a special full dress uniform (a white tunic) was provided. In October 1995, the Republican Guard was introduced into the Presidential Security Service, only to later be transferred to a separate department. In March 1997, in honor of the 5th anniversary of the formation of the guard, the Battle Banner was presented by President Nazarbayev. In October 1997, the office of the commander of the guard was relocated to the new capital of Astana. On 21 April 2014, Republican Guard and the Presidential Security Service were merged to form the State Security Service of Kazakhstan. In May 2017, the use of the term Republican Guard was abolished by a authorities. In June 2019, the unit was transformed into a Special Forces branch.

== Structure ==
The Republican Guard was one of the most combat-ready units of the Armed Forces. The Republican Guard as a separate branch was composed of:

- 1st Brigade (Almaty)
- 2nd Brigade (Astana)
- Ceremonial Battalion (Astana)
  - Honour Guard Company
  - State Symbols Protection Company
  - Horse Squadron (1996-1997)
  - Band of the Republican Guard
- Separate Training Battalion (Almaty)
- Separate Logistics Battalion (Nur-Sultan)
- Kokzhal Special Forces Detachment
- Hospital Unit
- Special Purpose Company

=== Special Purpose Company ===
The brigades can be compared to a reduced motor rifle regiment (BTR) of the Soviet Army, but without the artillery and tank battalions. In addition to line units, each brigade has a Special Purpose Company (RDA, Russian: рота специального назначения). This company receives training according to the training program of Army reconnaissance units. Furthermore, the members of the RDA companies are trained in hand-to-hand combat, as well as airborne operations.

=== Ceremonial Battalion ===
The Ceremonial Battalion (Russian: Церемониальный батальон) is the guard of honour unit of the Republican Guard. A cavalry squadron was maintained in the mid-1990s. The cavalry squadron was formed in May 1996 to participate in protocol events and processions. A month later, on the basis of military unit 0115 in the village of Chemolgan, training was held with servicemen with experience working with horses or cavalry training. Equestrian training began on the Panfilovsky breeding farm, with horses being selected with a height of 165-168 centimeters Boris Bardin, a specialist from the equestrian training department of the Institute of Border Troops, assisted greatly in preparing the squadron. The cavalry squadron first took part in the military parade on 16 December 1996 in Almaty, dedicated to the 5th anniversary of independence of the Republic of Kazakhstan. In connection with the transfer of the capital to the city of Akmola, at the end of 1996 the cavalry squadron was disbanded.

In July 1997, servicemen from the ceremonial battalion and the Presidential Band visited Malaysia at the invitation of the Yang di-Pertuan Agong. Within one week, the guard of honour company and the Presidential Band performed demonstrations and concerts. In October 1997, the ceremonial battalion was relocated to the new capital and housed in the Orbita microdistrict on the territory of a former kindergarten. It would eventually become the Aibyn Presidential Regiment in 2014.

== Commanders ==
- Seilbek Altynbekov (1992–1993)
- Tulegen Umbetbaev (1993–1995)
- Sat Tokpakbayev (1995–1999)
- Bulat Iskakov (1999–2000)
- Bulat Dzhanasaev (2001–2002)
- Bulat Iskakov (2002–2006)
- Abay Tasbulatov (2006–2012)
- Amangeldy Shabdarbayev (2012–2013)
- Mukhtar Ayubaev (2013–2014)

Deputy Head of the State Security Service of the Republic of Kazakhstan - Head of the Facilities Defense Service:

- Mukhtar Ayubaev (2014–2019)

Deputy Head of the State Security Service of the Republic of Kazakhstan - Commander of the Special Forces:

- Mukhtar Ayubaev (Since 26 June 2019)

== Notable members ==
- Murat Maikeyev, Chief of the General Staff of the Armed Forces of the Republic of Kazakhstan from 2016 to 2019.
- Talgat Berdigulov, Senior Director of Music of the Military Band Service.

== Gallery ==
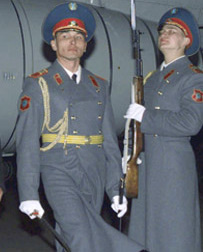
An officer and enlisted honour guard of the Republican Guard at Almaty International Airport.

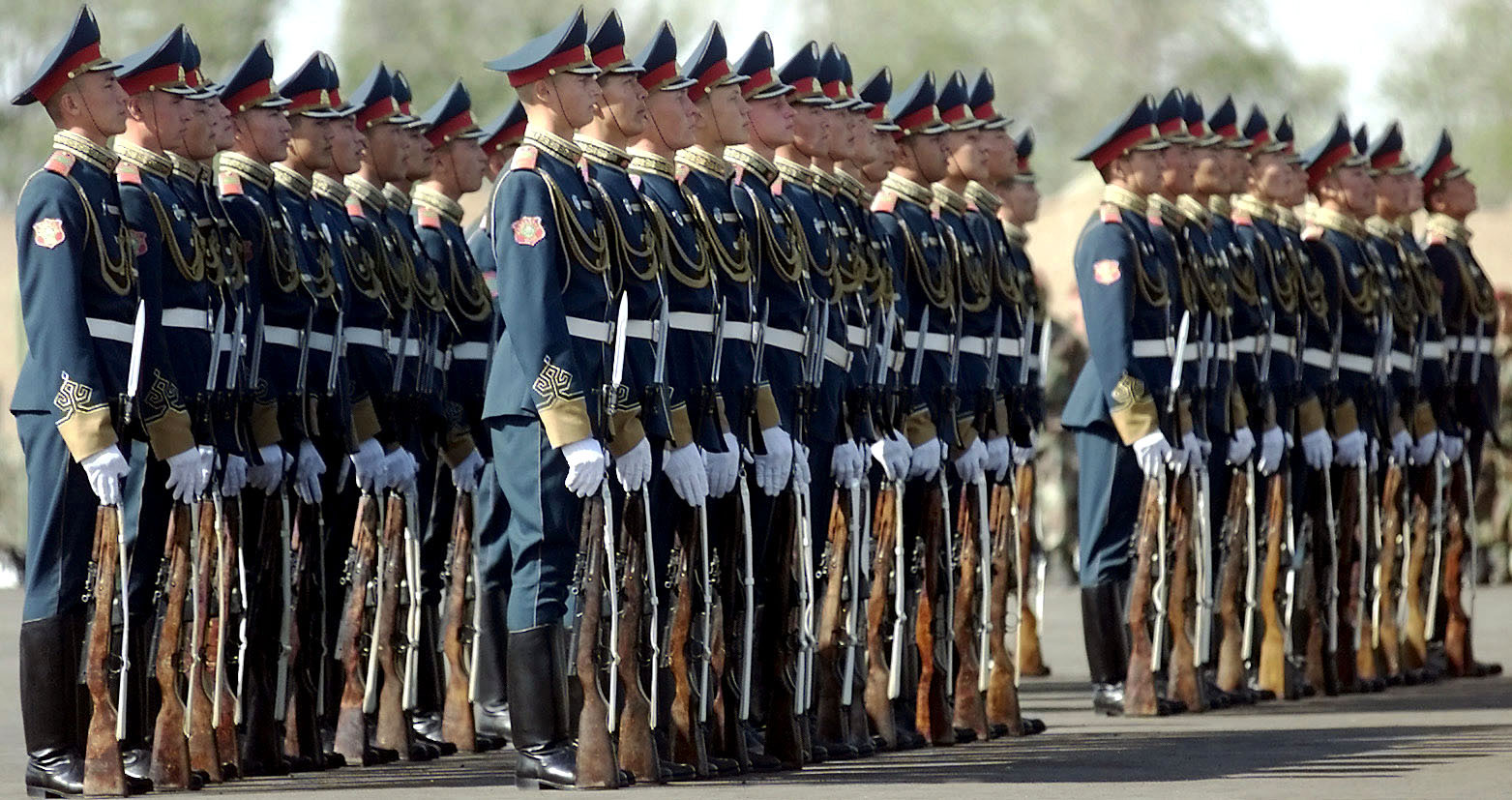
Members of the Guard of Honor battalion perform during CENTRASBAT opening ceremonies in 2000.

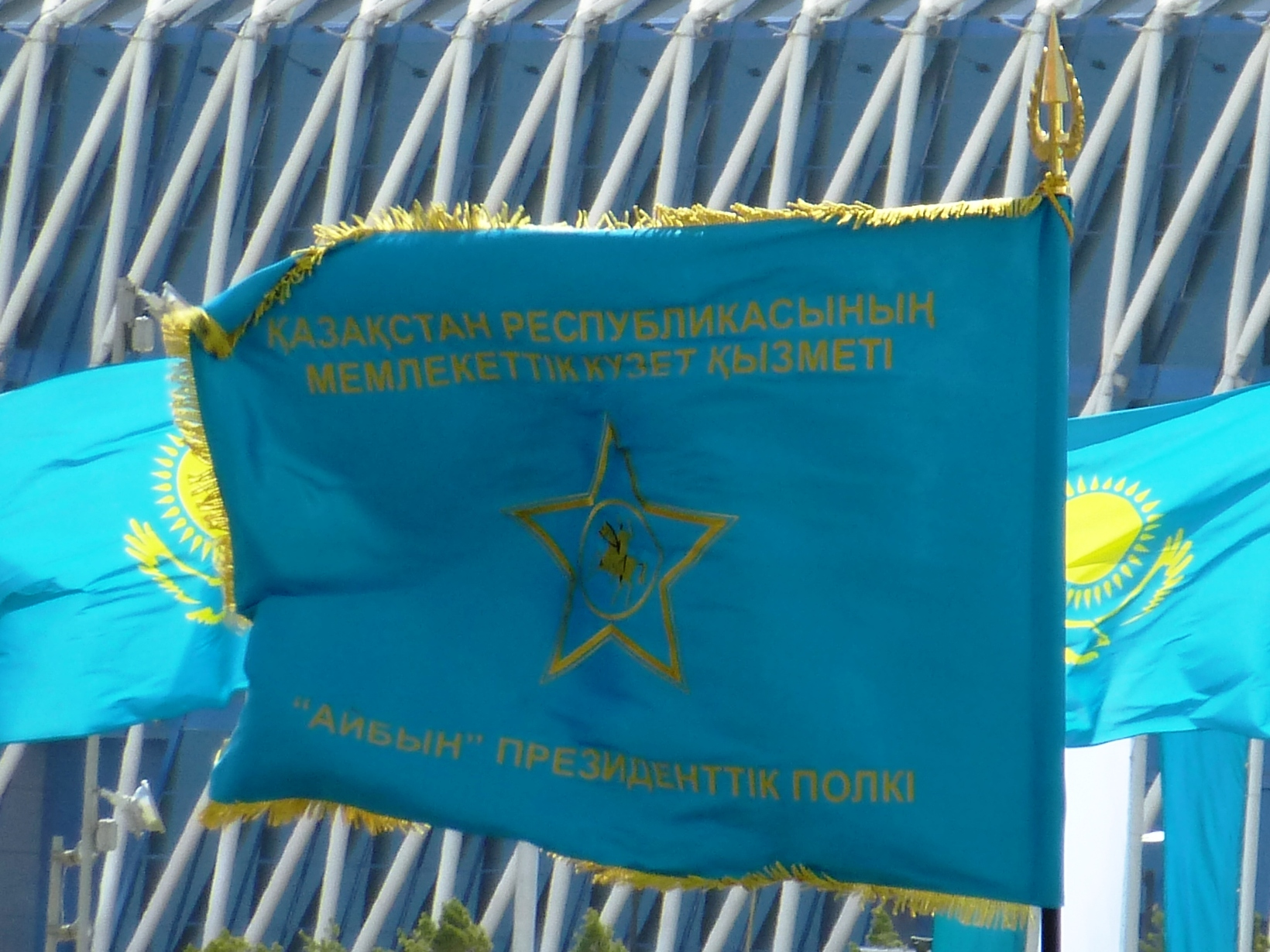
The banner of the Aibyn Presidential Regiment.

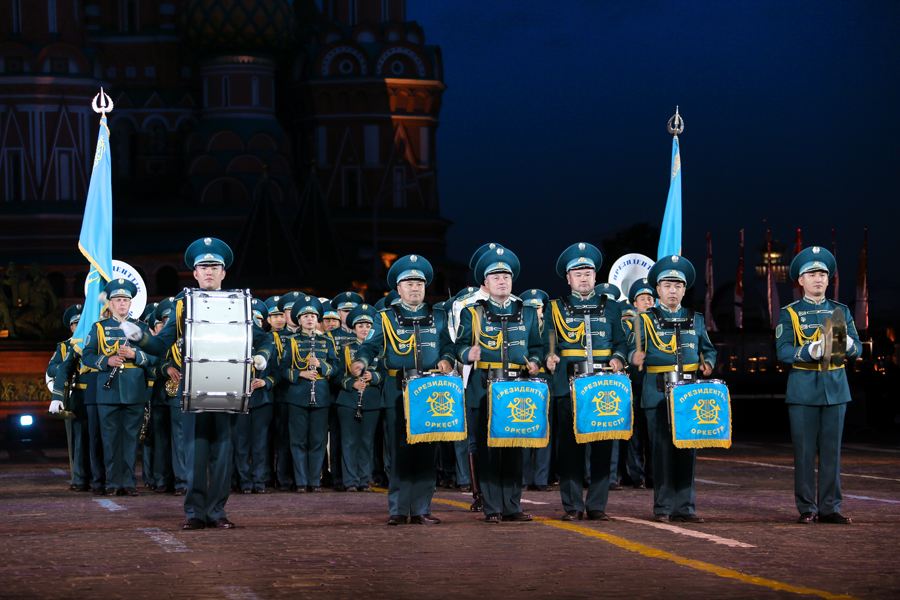
Band of the Republican Guard

== See also ==
- 154th Preobrazhensky Independent Commandant's Regiment
- Kremlin Regiment
