= Athletes Parade =

Soviet-era parade of national athletes

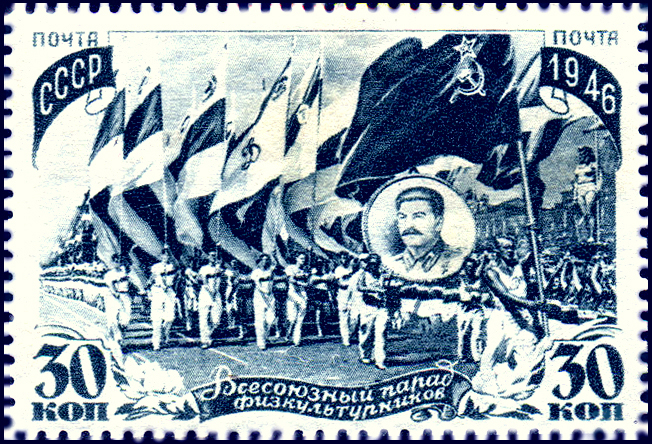
A stamp for in honor of the parade.

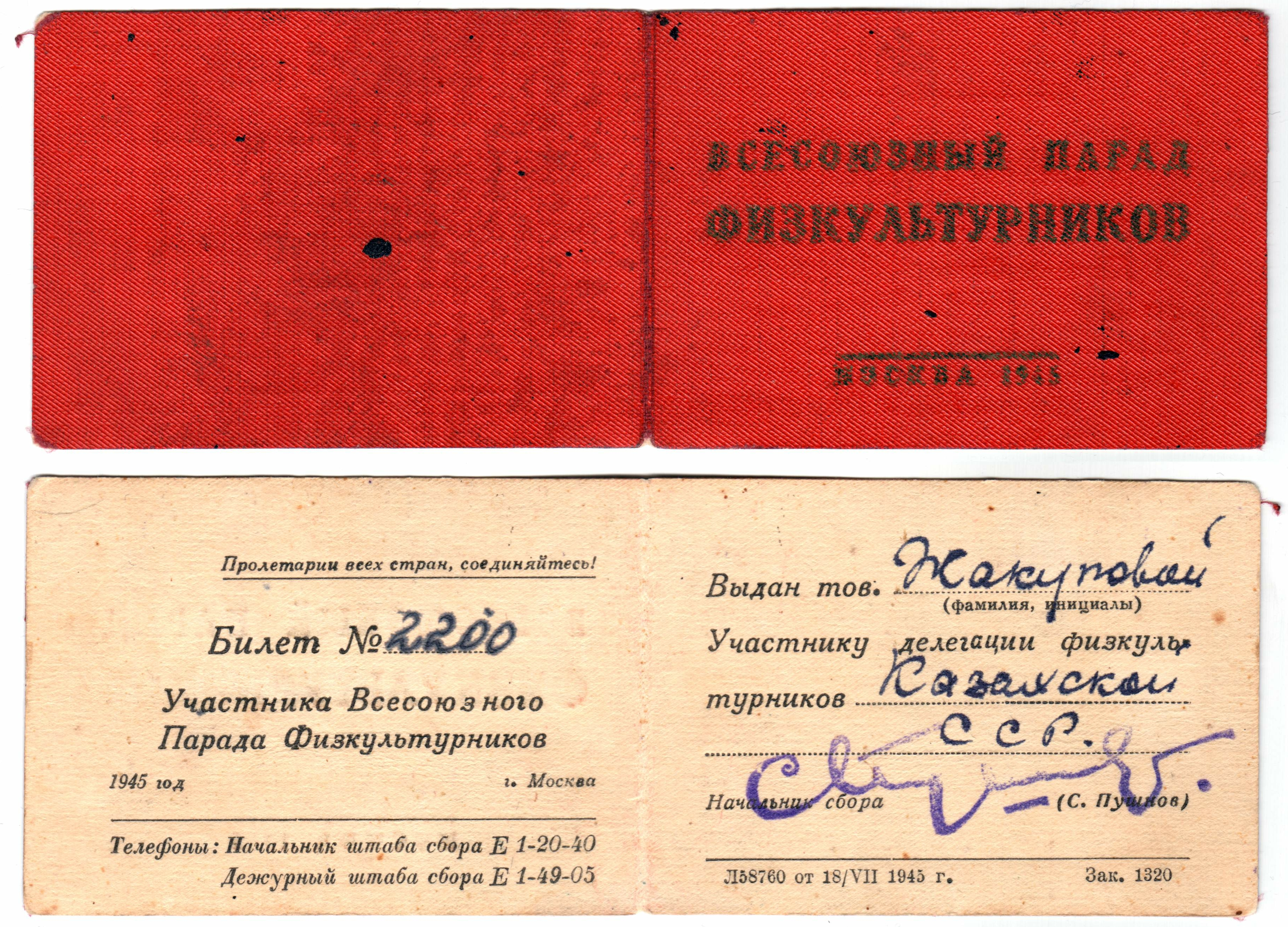
An identification card for a parade participant.

An Athletes Parade (Russian: Парад физкультурников) also known as a Physical Fitness Culture Parade was a traditional Soviet-era parade of national athletes and sports people, designed to promote physical education and sports among the Soviet people.

== History ==
In 1919, on Moscow's Red Square, the first parade of athletes and Vsevobuch detachments took place. It was the most ambitious parade to be held in the Russian capital during the early years of the Soviet Union. Parades were also held in some other cities of the USSR. In particular, in 1927, the celebration of the 10th anniversary of the October Revolution was marked with a parade of athletes was held in Barnaul. Beginning in 1931, parades began to be held annually, first in Moscow and Leningrad, and then in many cities across the nation, including republican capitals. At the 1935 parade, Soviet General Secretary Joseph Stalin was referred to as the "best friend of the pioneers" and in 1936, the slogan "Thanks to Comrade Stalin for our happy childhood!" began to be featured during the parades whenever the Young Pioneers marched. Since 1936, All-Union physical fitness culture parades began to be held in Moscow, involving athletes from all the Union republics. Since 1939, the parades have been timed to coincide with Athletes' Day, which fell every 12 August.

The first post-war parade of athletes (and the last on Red Square) took place on 12 August 1945. It was dedicated to the Victory over Nazi Germany as well as the oncoming military victories over Japan in the Second World War. 25,000 participants from 16 union republics took part. The sports and gymnastics part of the parade featured 22 performances, lasting 4 hours 20 minutes combined. Among the guests of honor were Marshal of the Soviet Union Georgy Zhukov, General of the Army Dwight D. Eisenhower and United States Ambassador to the Soviet Union W. Averell Harriman.

In the 40s, the sketches of costumes and compositions of the Physical Culture Parade on Red Square were created by the famous theater artist Fyodor Fedorovsky. The last parade of athletes was held in 1954.

== Expanded summary ==
Beginning 1937, the athletes' parade on Red Square was modeled on the civil-military parades held on both 1 May (International Workers' Day) and 7 November (October Revolution Day), with marching bands provided by the Soviet Armed Forces' Moscow Military District. Each of the republics had their national teams and sports clubs present for the event, with the republican athletes wearing their national costumes and carrying their republican emblems. Also, a number of Young Pioneers from the Vladimir Lenin All-Union Pioneer Organization wearing their red neckerchiefs and a number of the Voluntary Sports Societies and Departamental Sports Societies, with their unique club and society flags, were also represented in the parade with their athletes and coaching staff wearing uniforms of their club colors. At the Red Square stands were distinguished athletes and coaches, members of the national leadership of the All-Union Central Council of Trade Unions, the Komsomol and the Council for Physical Culture and Sports, the diplomatic corps and citizens of the capital. Including those performing in the cultural and gymnastic segments following the parade proper the total number of marches totalled around 19,000, a diverse contingent made up of all 16 Union Republics, organized on republican and sports organizational lines.

== In culture ==
- The parade of athletes that was held on 24 June 1938 in Moscow, is captured in the newsreel Sports Parade (directed by Grigori Aleksandrov).
- The sports parade held on 18 July 1939 in Moscow, is captured in the color chronicle film Blooming Youth (directed by Aleksandr Medvedkin).
- The color documentary chronicle called The All-Union Parade of Athletes on August 12, 1945 (directed by Vasily Belyaev, Central Studio for Documentary Film, 1945) was shown on Russia-K on Victory Day (9 May) in 2011.
- Soviet painter Alexander Nikolayevich Samokhvalov painted a picture in 1935 called Sergey Kirov Greeting Parad of Athletes, a painting which is located in the State Russian Museum.
- A mosaic by Vladimir Frolov known as The parade of athletes is located in the Moscow Metro at the Novokuznetskaya station.

== See also ==
- Moscow Victory Day Parade
- Battle Parade
- Parade of Nations
