= National Military-Patriotic Center of the Armed Forces of Kazakhstan =

Museum of the Armed Forces of Kazakhstan

Coordinates: 51°9′21.3″N 71°25′53.5″E

The National Military-Patriotic Center of the Armed Forces of Kazakhstan (Kazakh: Қазақстан Қарулы Күштерінің Ұлттық әскери-патриоттық орталығы, ҰӘПО, romanized: Qazaqstan Qaruly Küşterınıñ Ūlttyq äskeri-patriottyq ortalyğy, ŪÄPO; Russian: Национальный военно-патриотический центр Вооруженных Сил Казахстан, НВПЦ, romanized: Natsional'nyy voenno-patrioticheskiy tsentr Vooruzhennykh Sil Kazakhstan, NVPTs) is a museum of the Armed Forces of Kazakhstan. Located on Respublika Avenue in the capital of Astana, it was conceived by Minister of Defense Saken Zhasuzakov and was officially opened by decree of the President of Kazakhstan Nursultan Nazarbayev on 1 December 2016 (an official holiday as it coincided with the Day of the First President). The center is located at the former building of the Presidential Palace of Culture and the Nazarbayev Center.

== Overview ==
The National Military-Patriotic Center of the Armed Forces of Kazakhstan is a part of the center and is itself divided into several time periods that reflect various periods of Kazakh military history. Many of the artifacts have special significance in their relation to the 70th anniversary of the end of World War II and the 550th anniversary of the formation of the Kazakh Khanate. Besides the museum, a concert hall and exhibitions gallery are located inside the centre. Days after its creation, the center signed a memorandum of understanding and cooperation for youth education with the L. N. Gumilyov Eurasian National University, which is located just opposite of the center.

=== Almaty branch ===
The center has a branch in Almaty. The Almaty Museum is located in the building of the House of the Army (the former House of Officers of the Central Asian Military District) in the park of 28 Panfilov heroes. It has been operating since 1965. Since 2016, it has been a branch of the Military History Museum of Kazakhstan and is headed by the granddaughter of Major General Ivan Panfilov. In 1991, the building was declared a monument of architecture, and in 1993 it was included in the Almaty State Historical, Architectural and Memorial Reserve. After the Almaty Museum was turned into a branch of the national museum, the area was reduced from 2,200 to 600 square meters.

=== Band ===
The Central Band of the National Military-Patriotic Center is the leading creative team of the Armed Forces. It was formed in November 1995 at the directive General Sagadat Nurmagambetov, who was then the Minister of Defense. At the time of its founding, it was part of the Central Military Band of the Ministry of Defense of Kazakhstan and wasn't an independent band. In December 2015, a faction in the central band split off and formed its own unit which became part of the National Military-Patriotic Center. The band is recognized as one of the best creative groups in the country. On Defender of the Fatherland Day in early 2017, the band visited Moscow to perform at Alexander Hall in the Grand Kremlin Palace alongside ensembles from China and Serbia. In September of that year, it performed in China on the occasion of the 90th anniversary of the People's Liberation Army and in 2016, it performed domestically at the Shanghai Cooperation Organization Military Tattoo in front of the Astana Opera. In June 2019, it visited the Russian city of Khabarovsk to attend The Amur Waves International Military Bands Festival. The repertoire of the band consists mainly of works based on Kazakh national melodies. The director of the band is Captain Almas Ibragimov while the senior military conductor is senior lieutenant Daniyar Bultrikov.

== See also ==
- List of museums in Kazakhstan
- National Museum of the Republic of Kazakhstan
