= Shanghai Cooperation Organization Military Tattoo =

Military tattoo

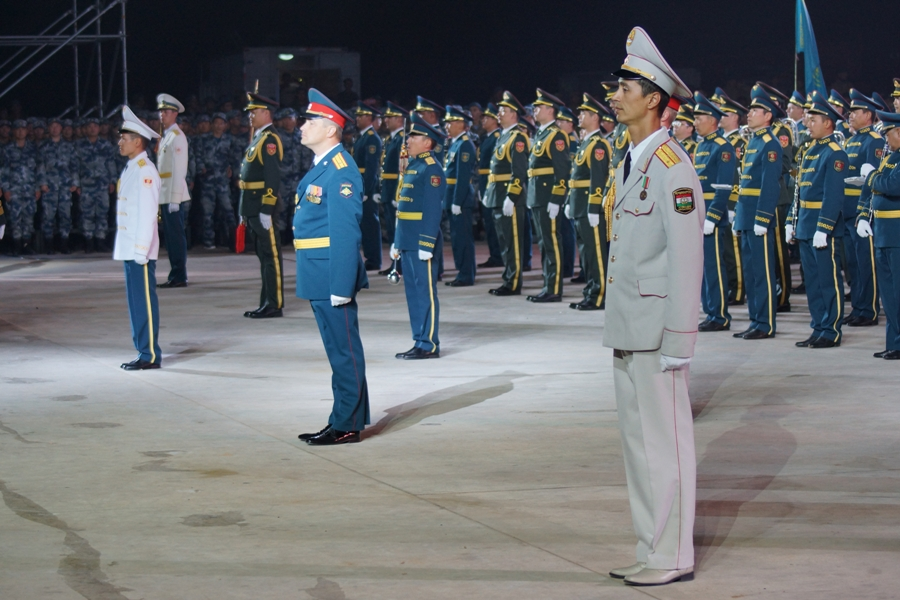
The first tattoo in 2014.

The Shanghai Cooperation Organization Military Tattoo (Chinese: 上海合作组织军乐节; Russian: Парад военного оркестра Шанхайской организации сотрудничества) also known as the SCO Military Tattoo is an annual military music event and military tattoo organized by the Shanghai Cooperation Organisation.

The musical groups that usually participate in the festival annually are the bands of SCO member states as well as SCO observer states. During the festival, musicians will usually perform for close to 8–10 minutes.

== History ==
=== 2014, Zhurihe ===
The inaugural tattoo took place at Zhurihe Training Base, Inner Mongolia. It took place during the a large SCO exercise, in which more than 5,000 servicemen took part.

=== 2015, St. Petersburg ===
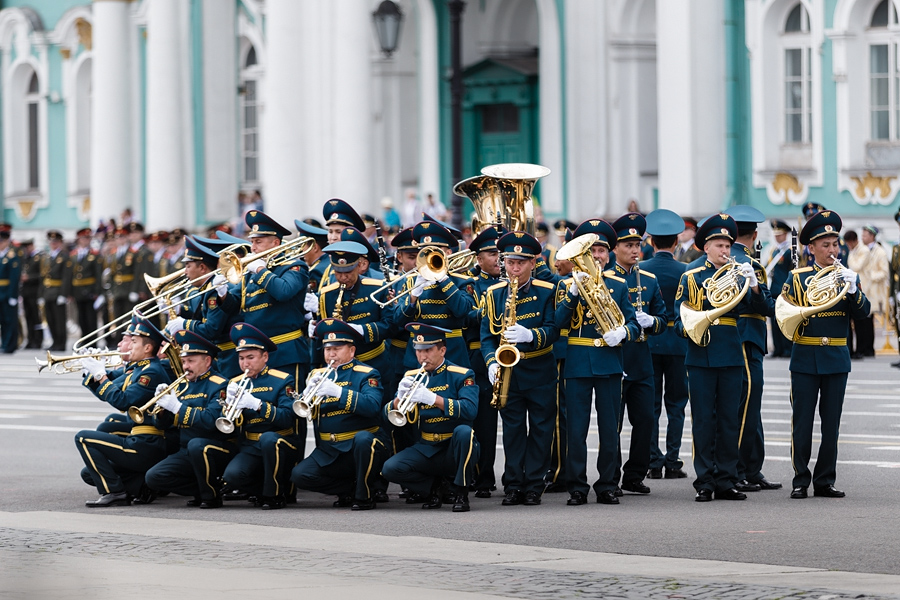

It took place on Palace Square in the center of the city. Military soloists took part in the festival for the first time.

=== 2016, Astana ===
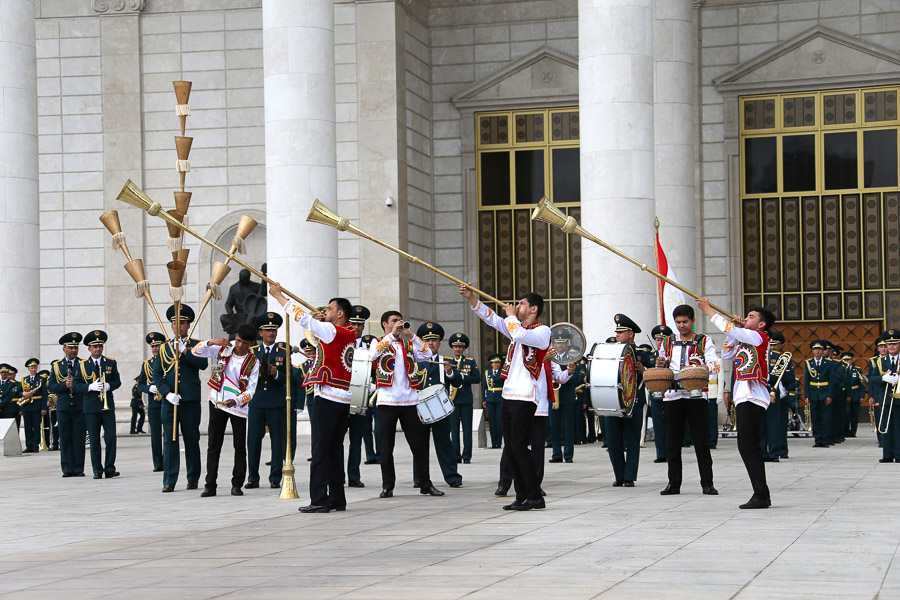

It took place in front of the Baiterek monument near the Astana Opera.

=== 2017, Shanghai ===
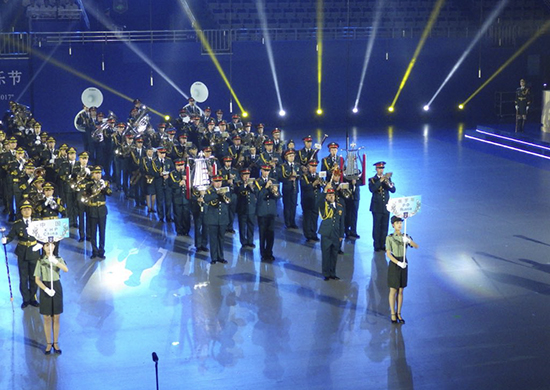

The total number of participants numbered in 426 musicians.

=== 2018, Beijing ===
It was the first festival to include India and Pakistan since they became full members. A parade featuring the military bands in the festival took place at the Olympic Green.

== Notable participants ==
Country	Band
China	Central Military Band of the People's Liberation Army of China
Kazakhstan	Presidential Band of the State Security Service of the Republic of Kazakhstan
Kazakhstan	Central Military Band of the Ministry of Defense of Kazakhstan
Russia	Central Military Band of the Ministry of Defense of Russia
Tajikistan	Military Brass Band of the Ministry of Defense of the Republic of Tajikistan
Kyrgyzstan	Band of the General Staff of the Armed Forces of Kyrgyzstan
Pakistan	Pakistan Armed Forces Band
India	Tri-Services Band

== Festival titles by year ==
Year	Title
2014	Peace Mission Military Festival
2015	Pipes of Peace Military Festival
2016	Trumpets of Peace Military Festival
2017	Trumpets of Peace Military Festival
2018	Trumpets of Peace Military Festival

== Gallery ==
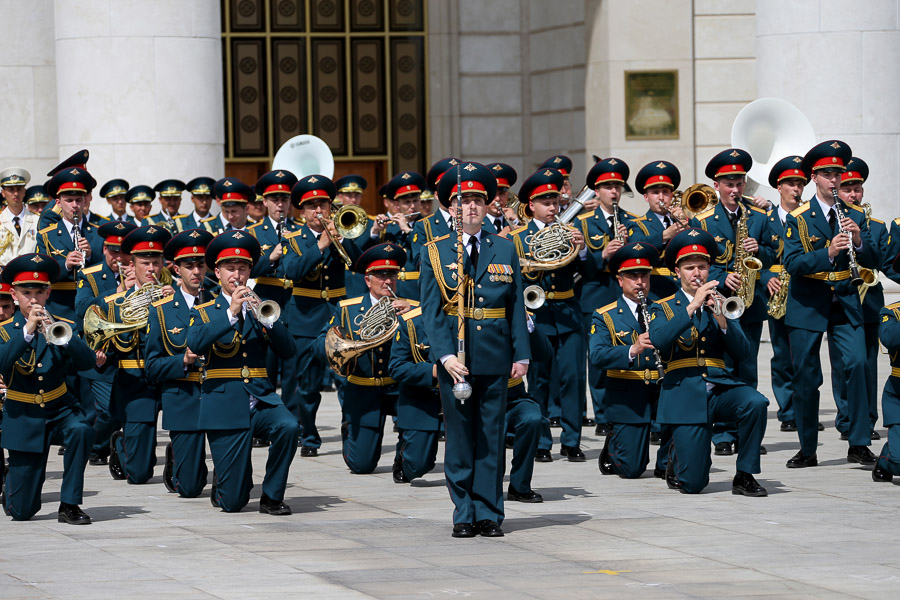

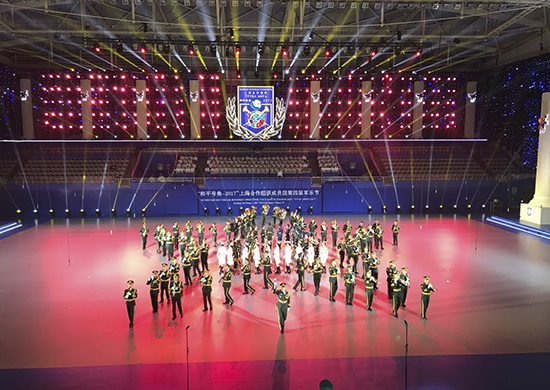

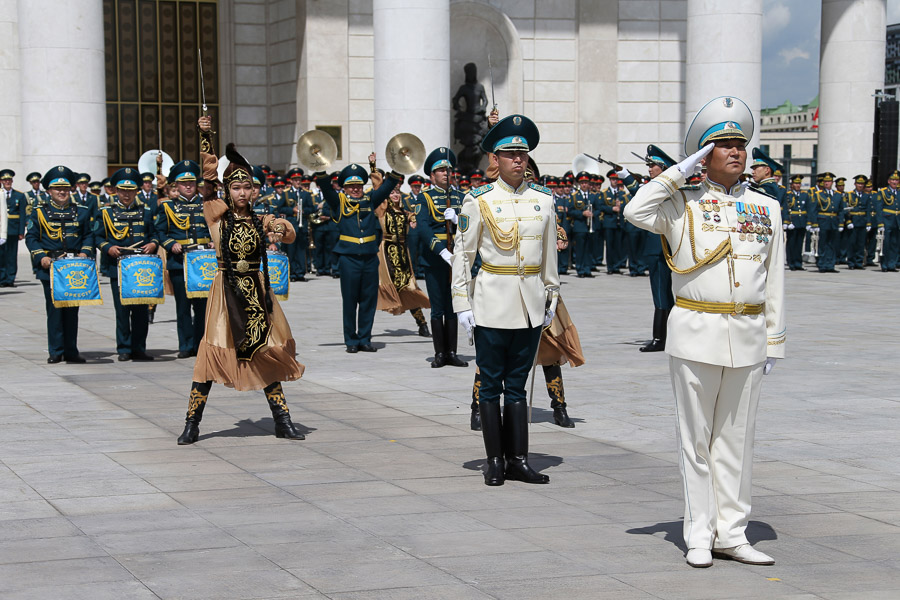

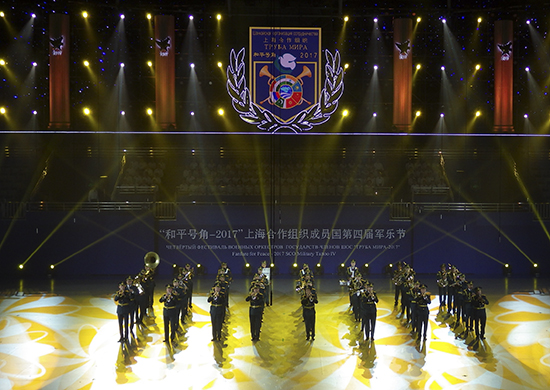

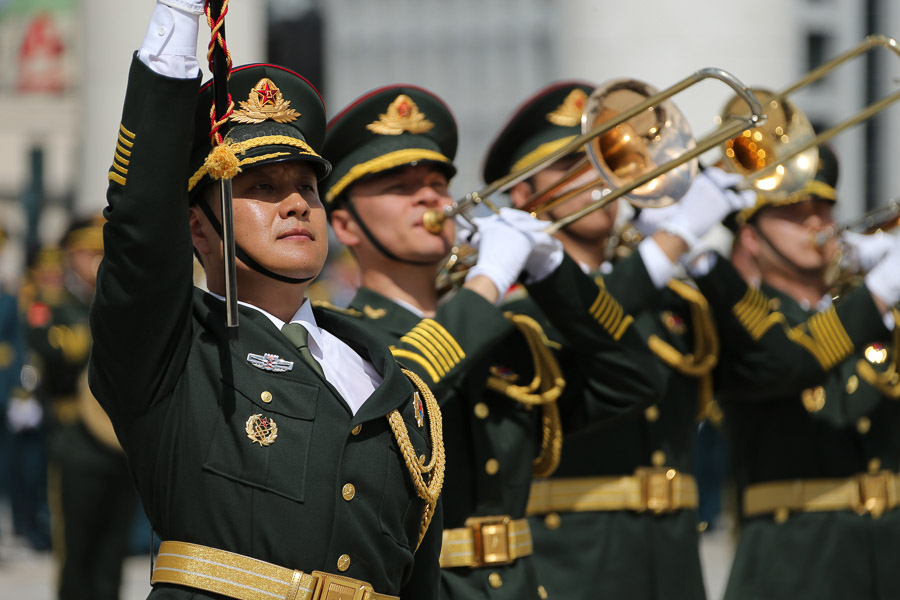

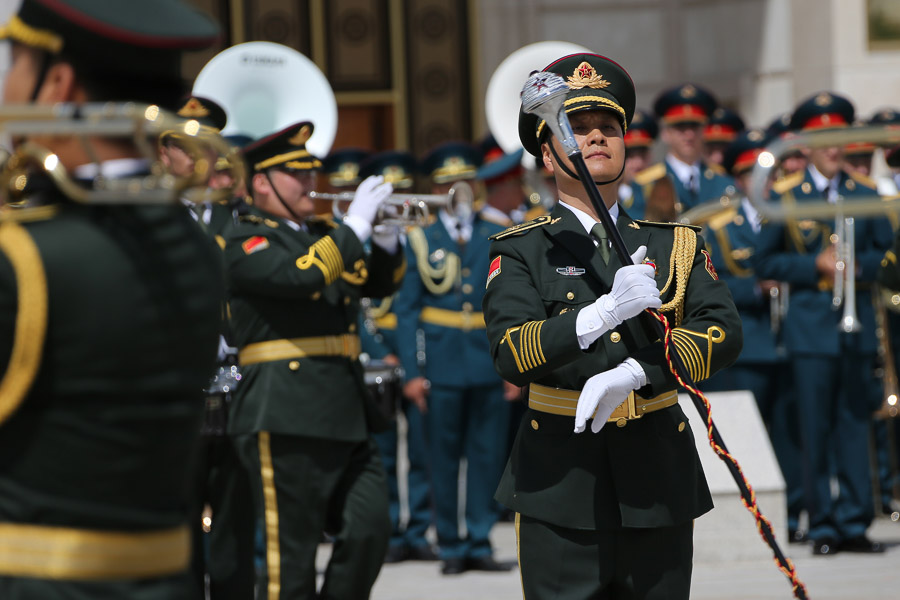

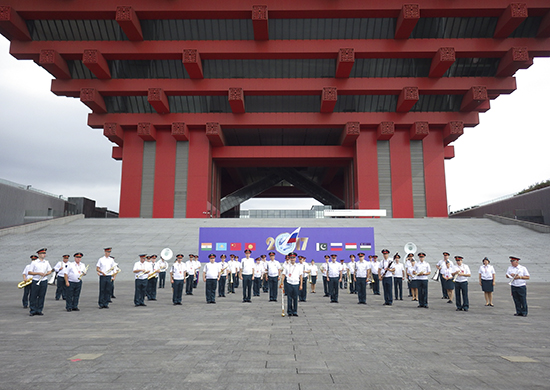

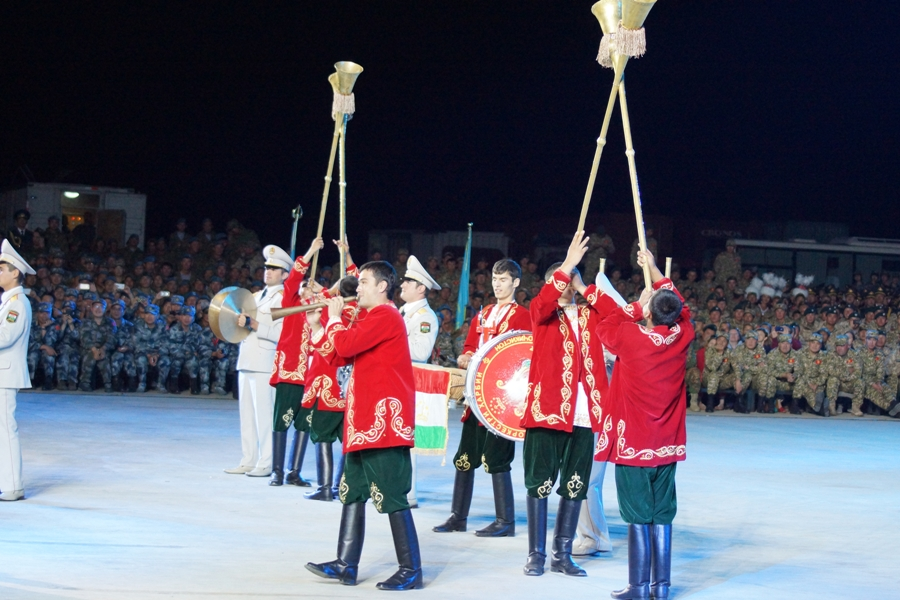

== Videos ==
- SCO Military Tattoo Parade held in Beijing on YouTube
- Live: First military tattoo commences at China’s Great Wall 2018“和平号角”上海合作组织军乐节开幕 on YouTube
