= Daler Sharipov =

Tajik military conductor (born 1984)

Captain Daler Murtazoyevich Sharipov (Tajik: Далер Муртазоевич Шарипов) is a Tajik military conductor. He was the Senior Director of the Military Brass Band of the Commandant Regiment of the Ministry of Defense of Tajikistan from 2009 to 2012. He was born in Dushanbe, the capital of the Tajik SSR on 12 November 1984. He came from a family of a musicians. In 2007, he graduated from the Moscow Conservatory, and worked in positions in the Defense Ministry, becoming the deputy in 2008, and in 2009 was appointed the head of the Band of the Commandant Regiment of the Ministry of Defense.

== Education ==
- Malika Sabirova Music School
- Moscow Conservatory (2002-2007)
