= Kokzhal (special forces) =

Kokzhal (Kazakh: Көкжал, lit. 'Wolf') is a counterterrorism special operations department of the State Security Service of Kazakhstan. Kokzhal was established in December 1995 on the basis of experience of leading countries of the world. The first commander, Major M. T. Makhatov, abroad, in particular, in the mid-1990s, visited the United States Central Intelligence Agency National Counterterrorism Centre.

== Personnel ==
Kokzhal is 88 staff in 4 fighting departments. Structurally, it is part of Military Unit No. 0111.

=== Recruitment ===
In staff recruitment the best candidates are chosen, who used to perform work in military services in special departments of the National Security Committee, Ministry of Defense and the Ministry of Internal Affairs, as well as sportsmen. Recruitment is based on reliability and professional aptitude.

=== Training ===
After completing a six-month professional selection course, who pass the test are enrolled in a working group of Kokzhal. In the course of the service, every soldier takes monthly examinations and vocational aptitude tests; those who fail the examinations are immediately expelled.

The recruits of Kokzhal not only have a command of basic military specialities, effective shooting and hand-to-hand combat techniques, they also pass air rescue, mountain rescue and special tasks. The training is structured so that each branch can complete its task independently. In case of specific tasks, they can be formed as mixed stages.
