= Otari =

Otari may refer to:

- Otari, Nagano, Japan
- Otari, Japanese electronics company, makers of analog and digital multitrack reel-to-reel tape recorders; see ProDigi
- Otari School, Wellington, New Zealand
- Otari-Wilton's Bush, native botanic garden and forest reserve, Wilton, Wellington, New Zealand
- Muhammad Naji al-Otari, Prime Minister of Syria
- Otari Arshba, Russian politician
- Otari Kvantrishvili, Georgian mafia boss

== See also ==
- Otar (disambiguation)
- Otaru
