= Talgat Berdigulov =

Kazakhstani composer

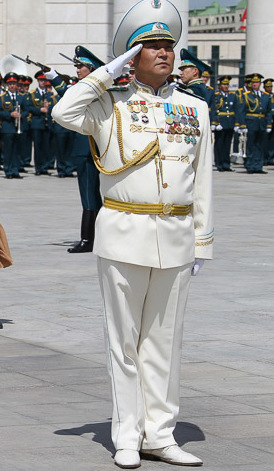
Berdigulov saluting during a military tattoo in Astana.

Colonel Talgat Aidzhanuly Berdigulov (Kazakh: Талғат Айджанұлы Бердіғұлов, Talğat Aidjanūly Berdığūlov; born 11 March 1974) is a Kazakhstani composer. He was director of the Presidential Band of the State Security Service of the Republic of Kazakhstan from 2005-2023. He is the composer of many Kazakh military marches, including the March of Ablai Khan (Марш Аблая Хана). He is also a laureate of national and international music competitions.

== Biography ==
He began his service in the Armed Forces of Kazakhstan as a musician in the military brass band of the Alma-Ata Higher All-Arms Command School (now the Military Institute of the Kazakh Ground Forces). He is a graduate of the Moscow Tchaikovsky Conservatory, where he graduated in 1999. He did a postgraduate internship in conducting with a qualification in opera and symphony orchestra at K. Moldabasanov Kyrgyz National Conservatory (2012–2014). He is currently a Senior Lecturer in the Department of Conducting at the Kazakh National Academy of Arts, having worked since September 1, 2023.

== Personal life ==
He currently lives in Astana with his wife and three children. Outside of Kazakh, he is fluent in Russian and English.

== Awards ==
- Honored Worker of Kazakhstan (December 5, 2012)
- For Distinguished Labor Medal (2007)
