= Aibyn Presidential Regiment =

- Айбынның Президенттік құрметті
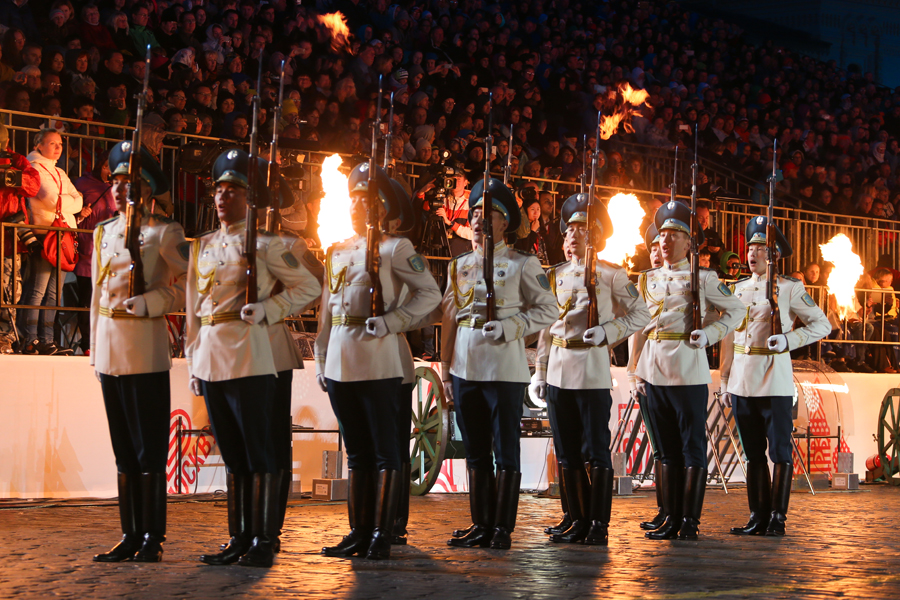
- The regiment participating in the Spasskaya Tower Festival in 2014.
- Active: 21 April 2014; 12 years ago
- Country: Kazakhstan
- Branch: Armed Forces of the Republic of Kazakhstan
- Type: Honor guard and protection force
- Role: Security; Public duties
- Part of: State Security Service of Kazakhstan
- Garrison/HQ: Astana

Commanders
- Current commander: Lieutenant Colonel Moldabaev Kairat Bekzatuly

Insignia
- Ceremonial Flag: Front: Back:

The Aibyn Presidential Regiment of the State Security Service of Kazakhstan (Kazakh: Айбынның Президенттік құрметті қорғау полкі, Aibynnyñ Prezidenttık qūrmettı qorğau polkı; Russian: Президентский полк "Айбын" Службы государственной охраны Республики Казахстан, Prezidentskiy polk "Aybyn" Sluzhby gosudarstvennoy okhrany Respubliki Kazakhstan) is a ceremonial honor guard of the State Security Service of Kazakhstan. It is comparable to the Kremlin Regiment in Russia and the Azerbaijani National Guard.

When the Republican Guard was formed in 1992, as decreed by the newly elected President of Kazakhstan, it included a Guard of Honor company called the Ceremonial Battalion. This was later renamed the Presidential Regiment, currently commanded by Captain Khasen Omarkhanov.

== Duties and public role ==
The unit takes a direct role in the provision of state protocol and ceremonial events. Particularly, it has taken part in the changing of the guard ceremony in the Ak Orda Presidential Palace since 2001 and the Kazakh Presidential Inauguration. In August 1992, the unit marched for the first time in front of President Nursultan Nazarbayev in Almaty and the following April, it mounted the guard of honour for visiting Turkish President Turgut Ozal. In February 1993, personnel of the guard of honor took 24-hour protection under of the national flag and coat of arms in the Palace of the Republic. In 2015, the Soviet Victory Banner was brought to Astana (the capital of Kazakhstan) to be trooped through Independence Square, Astana by personnel of the regiment in the Defender of the Fatherland Day parade on 7 May. It holds the ceremony of raising the national flag every year on December 1.

=== Foreign visits ===
In July 1997, the servicemen of the regiment and the Presidential Band went on a tour to Malaysia at the invitation of the Yang di-Pertuan Agong, presenting Kazakh culture and combat art there. In September 2006, the guardsmen were invited to the Russian capital for the celebrations of Moscow City Day, coming back a year later where they took part in the Spasskaya Tower Military Music Festival and Tattoo.

=== Public figure ===
The official regimental uniform is a white and aqua tunic for officers and a blue tunic for soldiers. Being at least 178 cm (5 ft 10 in) is one of the requirements to be in the regiment, the other is good health. The honorific of "Aibyn" was added in 2014.

== Gallery ==
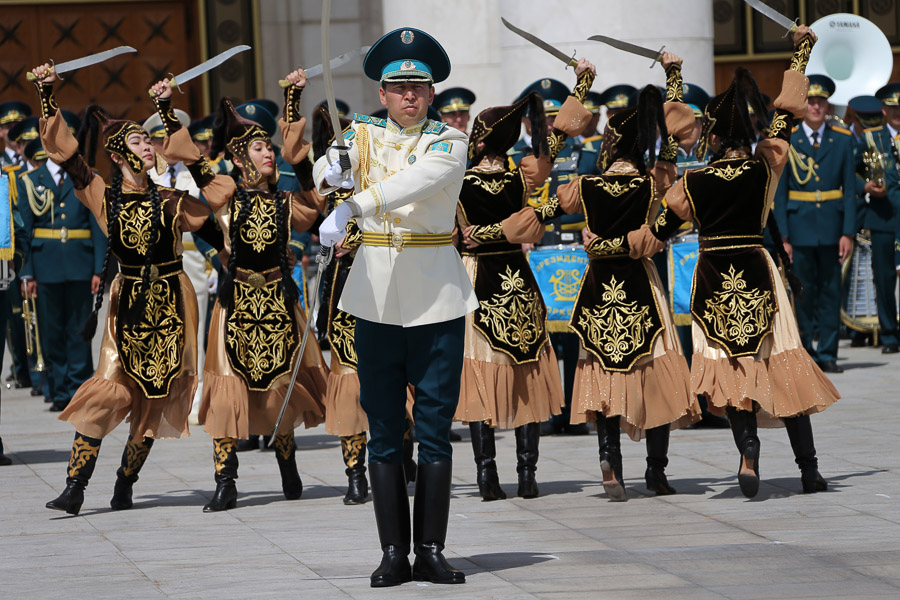
Captain Khasenov Azamat

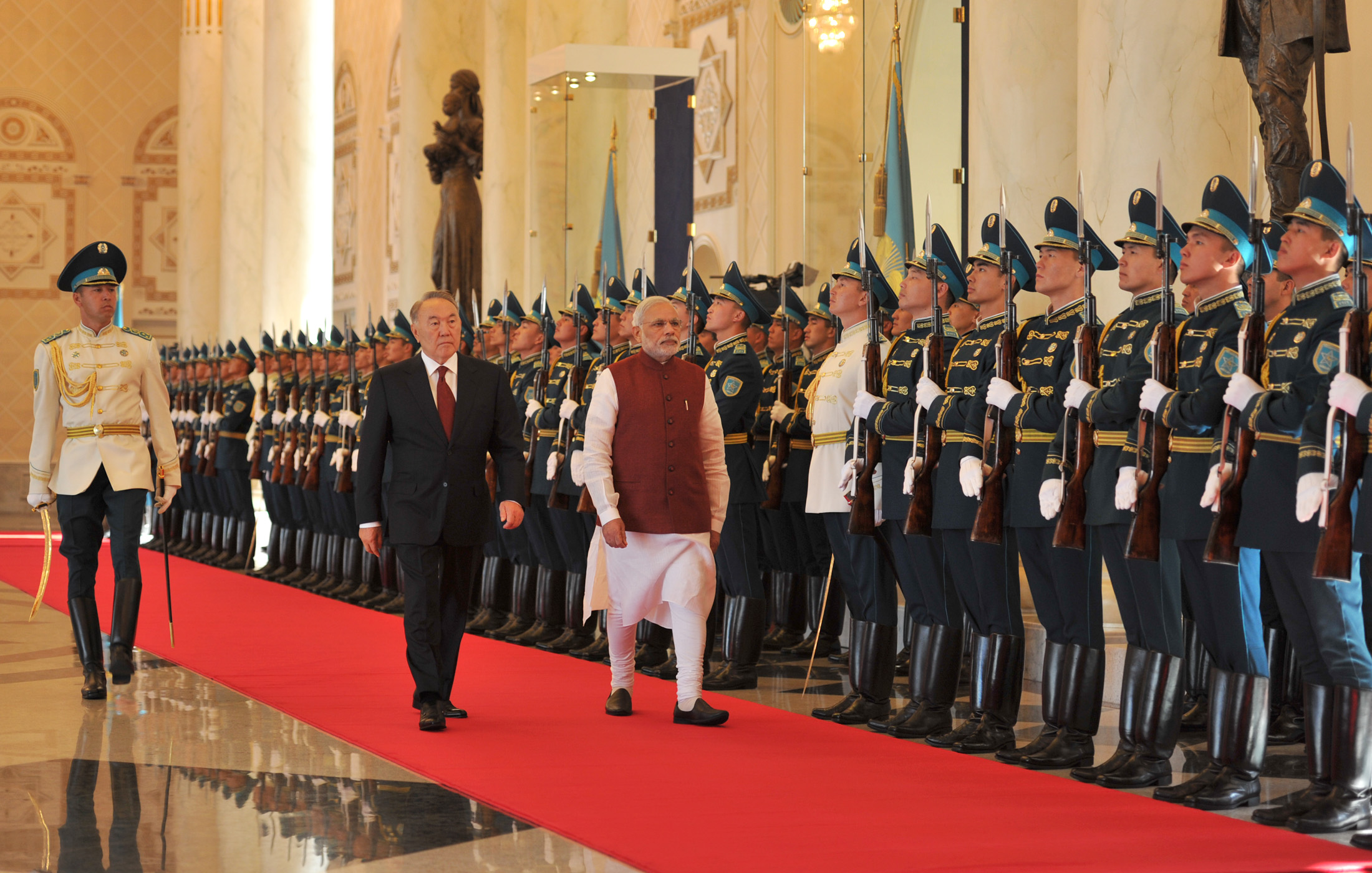
Indian Prime Minister Narendra Modi receiving a guard of honour from the regiment.

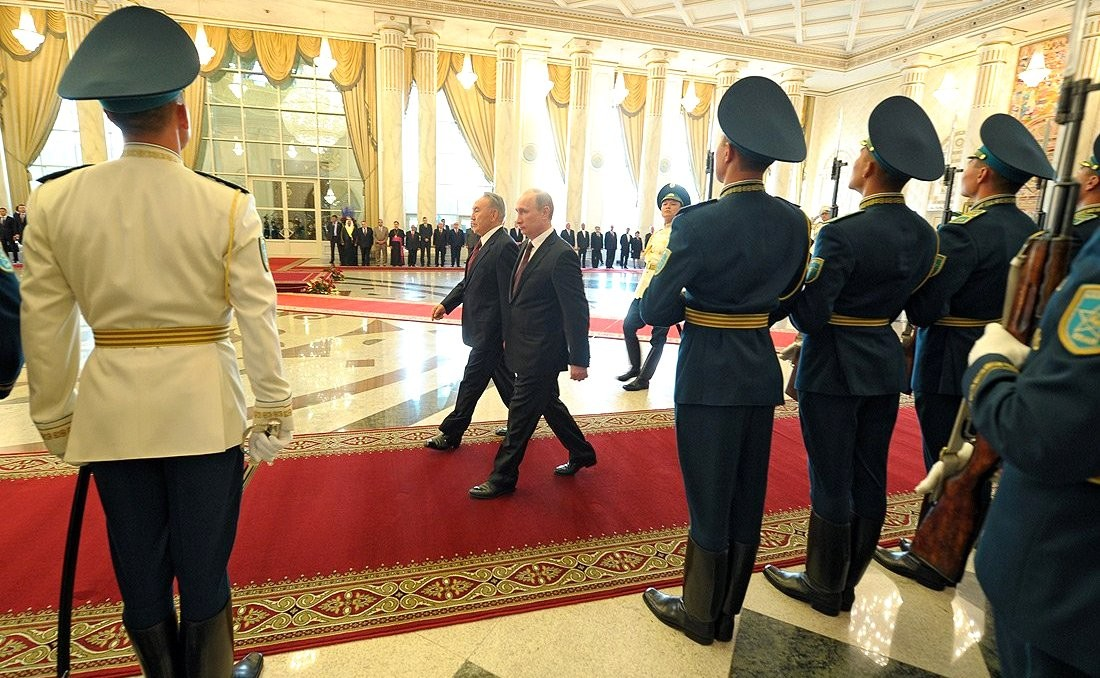
Russian President Vladimir Putin inspecting the guard of honour.

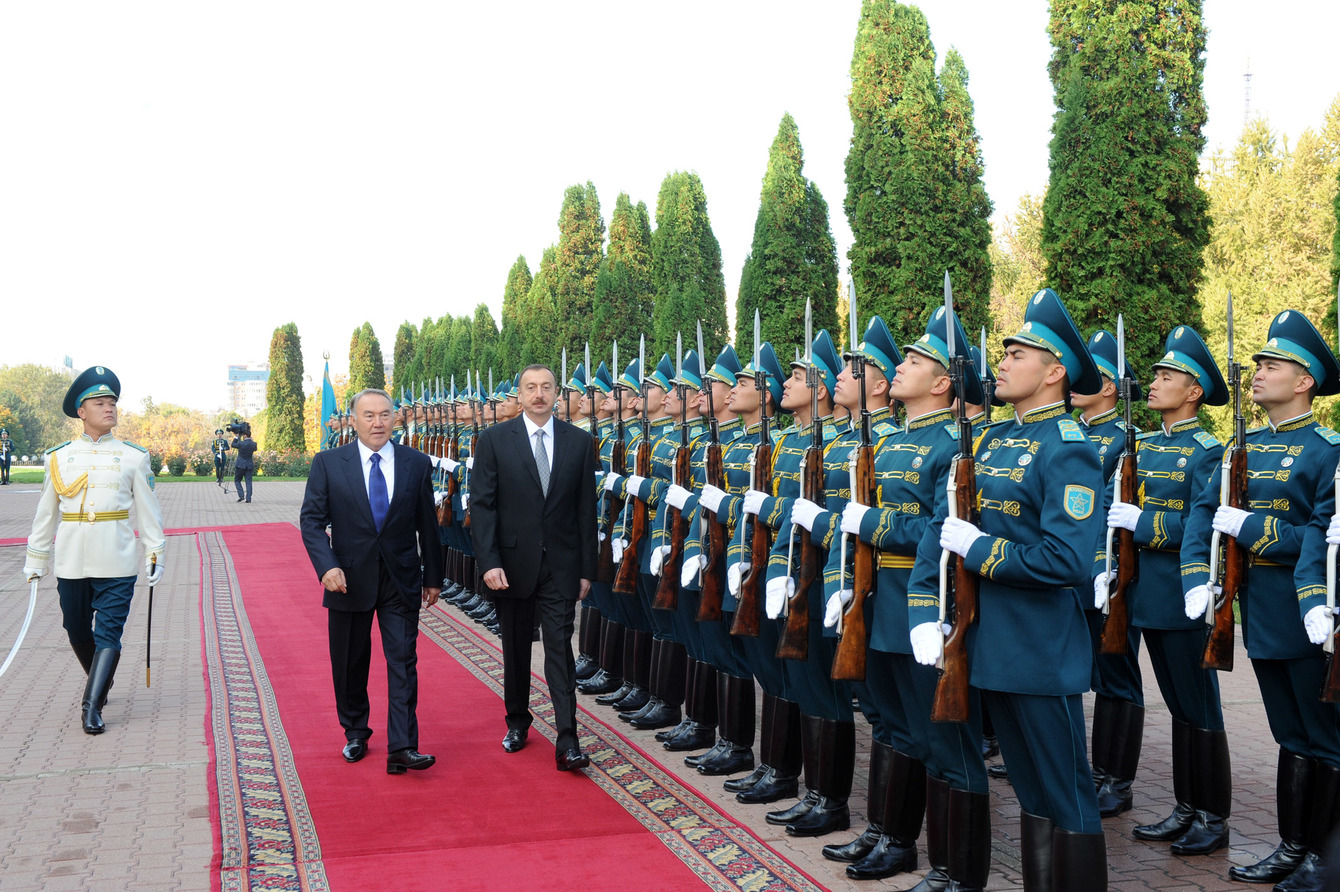
The regimental guard of honour during an inspection by President Ilham Aliyev in Almaty.

== See also ==
- Honor Guard Company of the Ministry of Defense of Kazakhstan

== Links ==
- Photos of the regiment
- В Казахстане начинается призывная кампания
