= Otar (village) =

Otar Отар
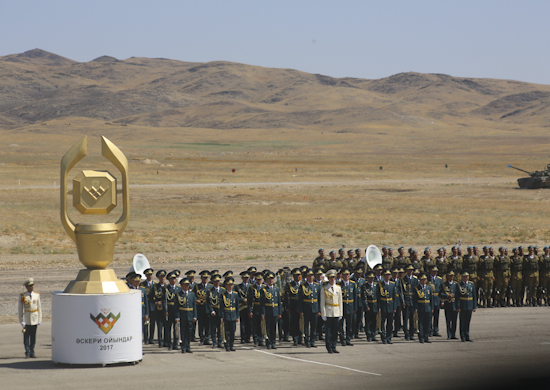
- View of the Otar Military Base in 2017

- Location in Kazakhstan
- Coordinates: 43°32′15″N 75°12′32″E
- Country: Kazakhstan
- Region: Zhambyl Region
- District: Korday District

Population (2009)
  - Total: 4,540
- Time zone: UTC+6 (Omsk Time)
- Postcode: 040306

Otar (Kazakh: Отар) is a village in the Zhambyl Region, south-eastern Kazakhstan. It is the administrative center of the Otar rural district (KATO code - 314851100). Population: 4,540 (2009 census results); 4,355 (1999 census results).

== Geography ==
Otar is located just west of the border with the Almaty Region by the southern end of the Chu-Ili Range. 1.5 kilometers (0.93 mi) to the east of the village lies the Otar Military Base.

=== Climate ===
Otar has a semi-arid climate (Köppen: BSk) with cold winters and hot summers.

Climate data for Otar (1991–2020)
Month	Jan	Feb	Mar	Apr	May	Jun	Jul	Aug	Sep	Oct	Nov	Dec	Year
Mean daily maximum °C (°F)	−1.4 (29.5)	1.2 (34.2)	9.8 (49.6)	18.4 (65.1)	24.5 (76.1)	30.3 (86.5)	33.0 (91.4)	31.9 (89.4)	26.1 (79.0)	17.5 (63.5)	7.6 (45.7)	0.4 (32.7)	16.6 (61.9)
Daily mean °C (°F)	−7.0 (19.4)	−4.2 (24.4)	3.6 (38.5)	11.4 (52.5)	17.1 (62.8)	22.7 (72.9)	25.2 (77.4)	23.7 (74.7)	17.6 (63.7)	9.6 (49.3)	1.3 (34.3)	−4.9 (23.2)	9.7 (49.5)
Mean daily minimum °C (°F)	−11.5 (11.3)	−8.5 (16.7)	−1.5 (29.3)	5.0 (41.0)	9.6 (49.3)	14.6 (58.3)	16.8 (62.2)	14.9 (58.8)	9.0 (48.2)	2.9 (37.2)	−3.2 (26.2)	−8.9 (16.0)	3.3 (37.9)
Average precipitation mm (inches)	18.2 (0.72)	20.6 (0.81)	26.7 (1.05)	48.4 (1.91)	44.6 (1.76)	36.8 (1.45)	32.4 (1.28)	15.3 (0.60)	15.7 (0.62)	31.5 (1.24)	31.4 (1.24)	20.9 (0.82)	342.5 (13.48)
Average precipitation days (≥ 1.0 mm)	4.9	5.5	5.5	7.7	6.9	6.8	5.5	2.8	2.6	4.3	5.6	5.1	63.2
Source: NOAA

== History ==
During World War II, in 1942, the 1st Uhlan Regiment of the Polish Anders' Army was stationed and organized in Otar, before it was evacuated from Kazakhstan to fight against Nazi Germany.
