= Exemplary Military Band of the Ministry of Defense of Kyrgyzstan =

- Kyrgyz: Кыргыз Республикасынын Коргоо министрлигинин өзүнчө аскердик-көрсөтмөлүү оркестринин
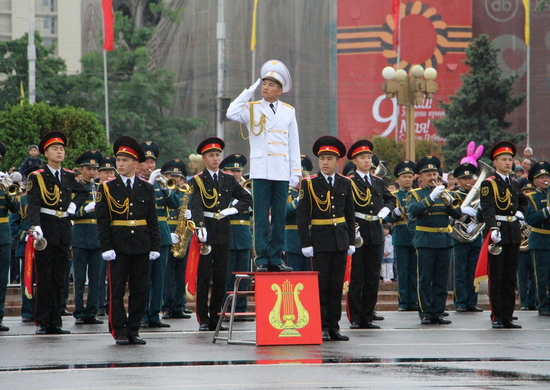
- The band (led by Captain Jumatay uulu Dastan in the white tunic) during a 2015 victory day parade on Ala-Too Square.
- Active: 7 October 1992; 33 years ago
- Allegiance: Armed Forces of the Kyrgyz Republic
- Branch: (Kyrgyzstan) Kyrgyz Armed Forces
- Size: 40
- Garrison/HQ: Central Army House of the General Staff, Bishkek

Commanders
- Senior Military Director: Captain Jumatay uulu Dastan

The Exemplary Military Band of the Ministry of Defense of Kyrgyzstan (Kyrgyz: Кыргыз Республикасынын Коргоо министрлигинин өзүнчө аскердик-көрсөтмөлүү оркестринин), also formerly known as the Band of the Central Army House of the General Staff is a military musical group of the Armed Forces of the Kyrgyz Republic.

== History ==
It was officially founded on October 7, 1992, by the Order of the Chairman of the State Committee of the Kyrgyz Republic for Defense Affairs, as the successor to the band of the 8th Guards Panfilov Division. In connection with the reorganization of the Armed Forces in December 1995, the band was put under the direct command of the Central Army House of the Armed Forces General Staff.

== Organization ==
=== Ensenbles ===
The band has the following ensembles:

- Exemplary Band
- Brass Band
- Symphonic Band
- Big Band

=== Personnel ===
Captain Jumatay uulu Dastan has been the band director since 2011. Popular Kyrgyz artists such as Mirbek Atabekov, Tata Ulan, and Gulzhigit Kalykov have performed with the band's symphonic band. All 40 members of the band range between 20 and 50 years old.

=== Uniform ===
The official uniform color band is the same as the uniform of the National Guard (the most recent version being implemented in 2015) is dark turquoise, with the summer uniform being a tunic worn over a buttoned up shirt and a tie accompanied by trousers of the same color, as well as boots, white gloves and a peaked hat. The winter uniform is a grey overcoat that is worn over the regular uniform while a traditional Russian Ushanka hat is worn. The director of the band wears a more recognizable white summer tunic instead of a turquoise one.

== Events ==
=== Protocol duties ===
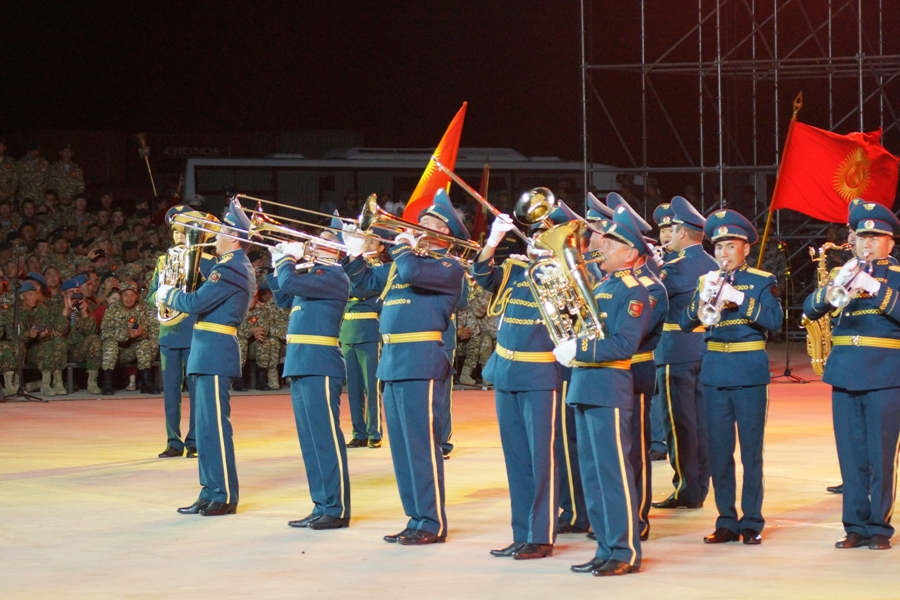
The band at the inaugural Shanghai Cooperation Organization Military Tattoo in 2014.

All members of the band are active duty soldiers as they are trained with infantry knowledge. The band has frequently performed the National Anthem of Kyrgyzstan on Kyrgyz Television, and has a complete repertoire of the national anthems of foreign countries in its archives. It commonly works with the song and dance ensemble of the armed forces and with the Honour Guard Battalion of the 701st Military Unit of the National Guard in actively participating in military parades, theatrical performances and other events in the country. Notable parade performances include those on Independence Day, Defender of the Fatherland Day and Victory Day (9 May). It also takes part in the opening of the Supreme Council.

=== Public and international events ===
One of the more high-profile military tattoos it has taken part in is the Shanghai Cooperation Organization Military Tattoo, of which it has attended all 5 editions. It was in fact the first international trip the band took, arriving in China in the summer of 2014 by way of a government provided bus. It also has conducted flashmobs at public places such as Manas International Airport where it performs popular music.

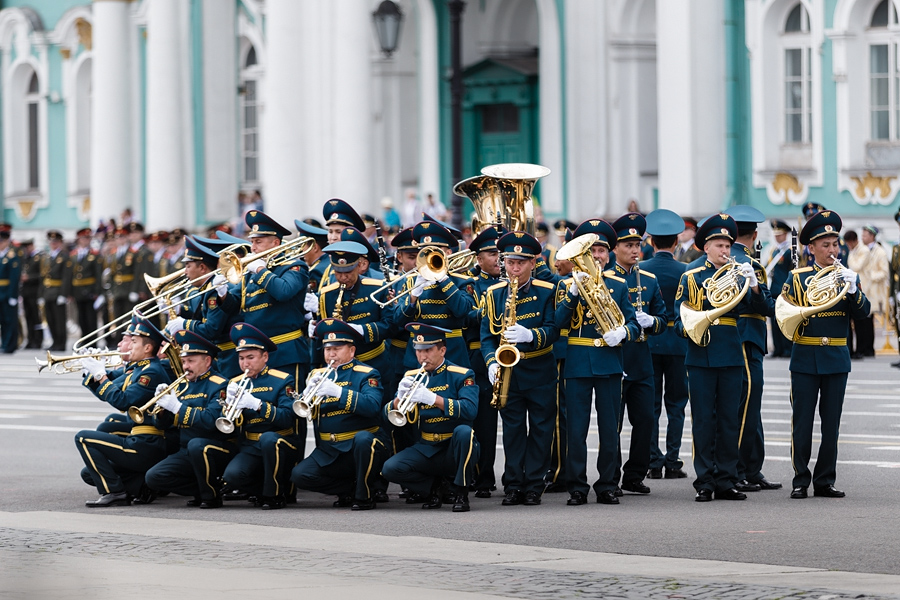
The band in St. Petersburg

== Repertoire ==
- Kyz kuumai March
- Kara Zhorgo March
- March of the Preobrazhensky Regiment
- Triumph Of The Winners
- Slow March of Tankman Winners
- Slow March of Officer Schools
- Presidential Fanfare
- Signal "Listen to all!"
- Farewell of Slavianka
- "Air March" (Russian: "Авиамарш")
- Funeral March
