= Presidential Band of the State Security Service of the Republic of Kazakhstan =

Military band unit

- Қазақстан Республикасы Республикалық Ұланының Президенттік оркестрі (Kazakh)
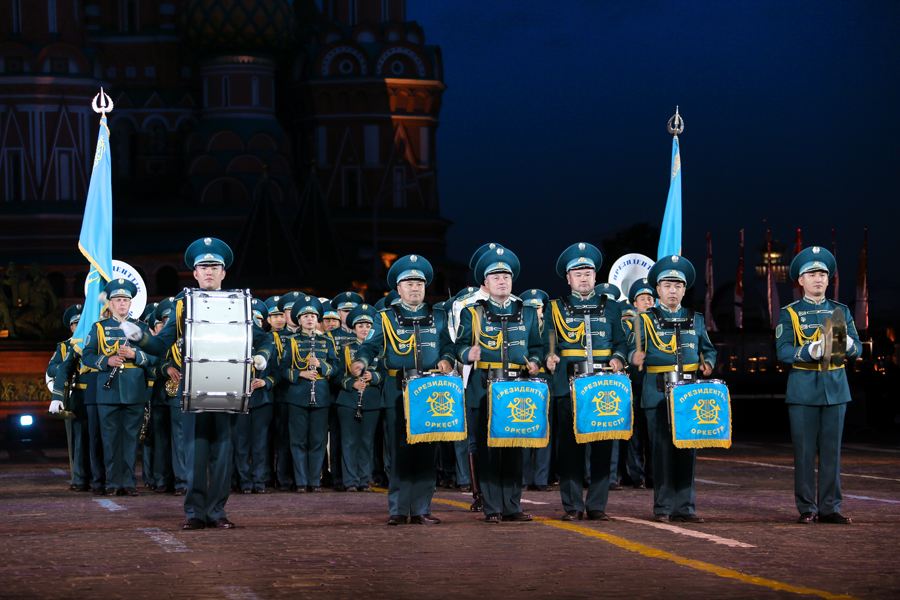
- Spasskaya Tower Military Music Festival and Tattoo in 2014
- Active: 1992–Present
- Country: Kazakhstan
- Branch: Republican Guard (1992–2014); State Security Service of Kazakhstan (2014-Present)
- Type: Military Band
- Role: Public Duties
- Part of: Military Band Service
- Garrison/HQ: Astana
- Colors: Steelblue; White
- Unit number: 0113

Commanders
- Current commander: Lieutenant Colonel Darkhan Rakhymgaliyev
- Notable commanders: Arystanbek Mukhamediuly (1997-2001)

Insignia
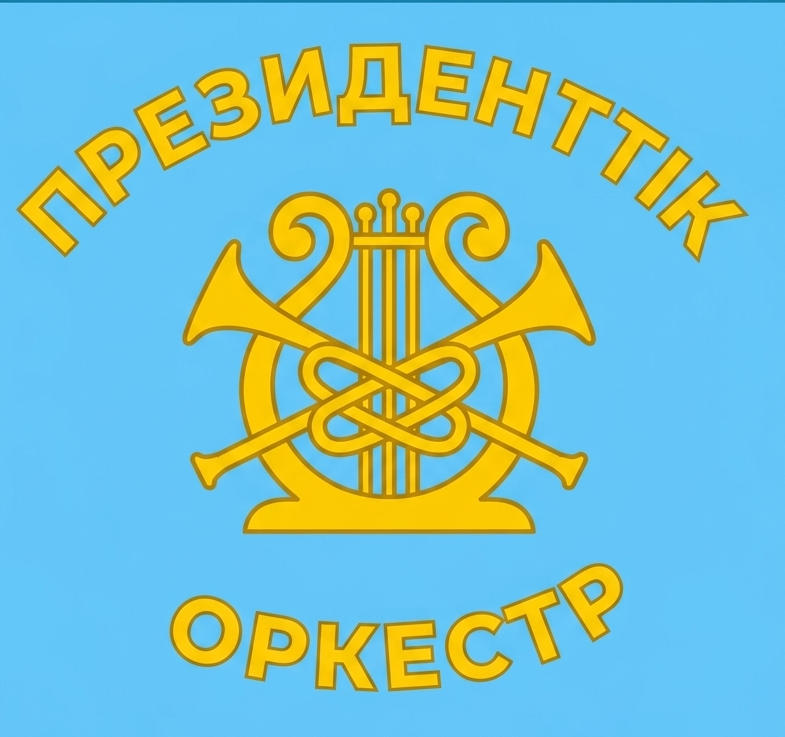
- Identification symbol

The Presidential Band of the State Security Service of the Republic of Kazakhstan, (Note: Kazakh: Қазақстан Республикасы Республикалық Ұланының Президенттік оркестрі, romanized: Qazaqstan Respublikasy Memlekettık qauıpsızdık qyzmetınıñ Prezidenttık orkestrı) formerly the Band of the Republican Guard of Kazakhstan, is a military music unit made for state ceremonies carried out by the State Security Service of Kazakhstan. The band has performed in countries of the CIS, as well as United Kingdom, Italy, United States, Turkey, Austria, Belgium, Malaysia, Egypt, India, Bahrain, Greece and other countries. The band's repertoire includes almost all the international anthems, military marches, folk music, pop music, and classical music foreign and Kazakh composers. The band is under the direction of a bandmaster and senior military director.

== History ==
The band was formed in accordance with the Decree of the President of Kazakhstan in 1992 to provide the musical part of state, protocol, events and official celebrations. Until 1994, the it was called the Exemplary Band of the Kazakh Armed Forces and from 1994 to 2014 was a part of the Republican Guard. In 1997, the band was relocated to the new capital of Astana from Almaty. In April 2014, when the State Security Service of Kazakhstan was created, the band was rebranded as the Presidential Band. In 1994, a string quartet was formed, with musicians working with it over the years, including Bayan Musakhodjaev, Kairzhan Zholdybaev and Aida Ayupova. In 2006, the chamber music quartet was transformed into a chamber music ensemble. From 1997 to 2000, the Presidential Band included a Big Band Jazz Band under the direction of Honored Art Worker Alexander Ablaev. In 2015, the ensemble was revived under the direction of Suyunbai Kazbaev, a graduate of the Almaty State Conservatory. In 1997, a folk ensemble was created, which would later in 2006 become a laureate of the Daryn State Youth Prize.

== Organization ==
=== Ensembles ===
Ensembles that belong to the band include the following:

- Brass Band
- Ceremonial Band
- Symphonic Band

A member of the brass band carries a lyre, which serves as the ceremonial symbol of the unit at official ceremonies.

==== Dance Ensemble ====
The dance ensemble was founded in 1997 and encompassed all styles and genres of dombra music, folk singing, and folklore and ethnographic instruments. The first director of the dance ensemble was Botagoz Sarina, a graduate of the Saint Petersburg State Institute of Culture. In subsequent years, Talant Shorukov, a graduate of the Moscow Studio at the Igor Moiseyev Ballet, and Major Natalia Fokina, a graduate of the West Kazakhstan State University, served as the ensemble's director. It was later transformed into the dance ensemble of the State Security Service on May 4, 2014. In 2021, due to organizational and staffing measures, the dance ensemble was abolished.

=== Personnel ===
The requirements for membership in the band include physical standards such as the ability to run at least 1 mile (1.6 km). During an interview with Kazinform in August 2017, Tlek Ergaliev, the director of the band's brass group, stated that female bandsmen "must be beautiful and slim".

== Main repertoire ==
The Presidential Band's primary repertoire includes the following pieces of music:

- Meniń Qazaqstanym (national anthem)
- Presidential Fanfare
- Slow March No. 1
- Slow March No. 2
- Slow March No. 3
- Unknown Signal
- Metropolitan March
- Jubilee Slow March "25 Years of the Red Army"
- March of Ablai Khan
- March of Amangeldi İmanov

== Director ==
- Arystanbek Muhamediuly (1997-2001)
- Colonel Talgat Berdigulov (2005-2023)
- Lieutenant Colonel Darkhan Rakhymgaliyev (2023-Present)

== Notable members ==
- Alexey Kutunov, rector of the Zhurgenov Kazakh National Academy of Arts.
- Murat Chalaala, chief conductor of the Astana Symphony Orchestra.
- Arystanbek Muhamediuly, former Minister of Culture and Sports and director of the band from 1997 to 2001.
- Galym Akhmedyarov, director of the Astana Opera and a former section leader in the band.

== Gallery ==
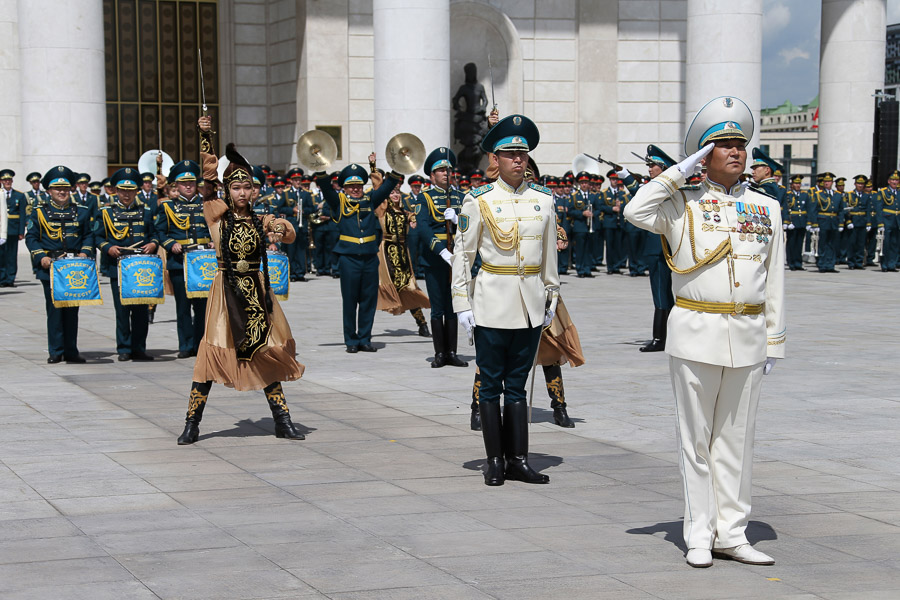
The former band director, Colonel Talgat Berdigulov.

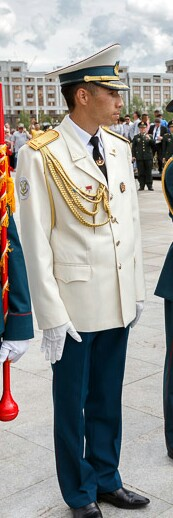
The current band director, Lieutenant Colonel Darkhan Rakhymgaliyev, in 2016.

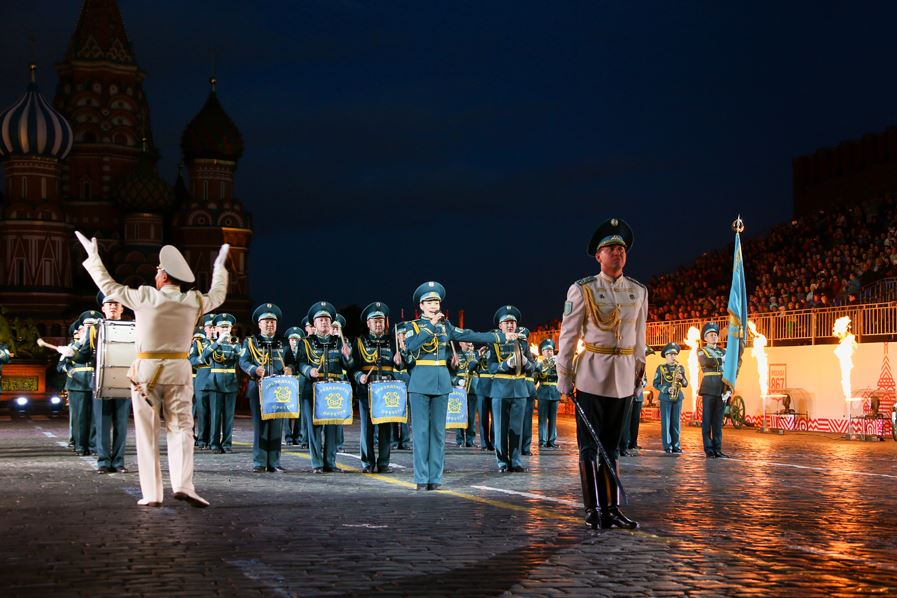

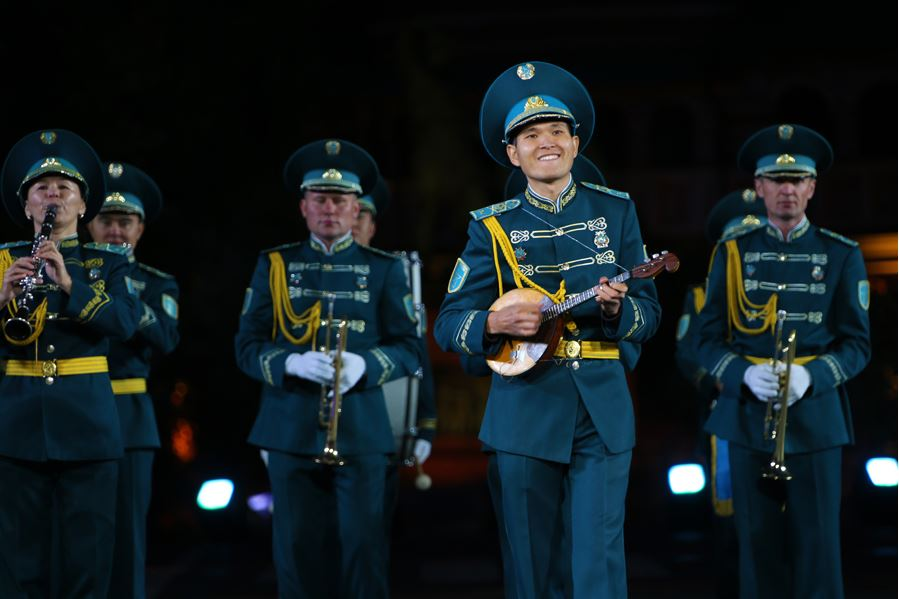

== See also ==
- Central Military Band of the Ministry of Defense of Kazakhstan
- Military Band Service (Kazakhstan)
- Band of the National Guard of the Republic of Kazakhstan
- Presidential Band of the Russian Federation
