= Otar (given name) =

- Gender: Male
- Language: Georgian

Origin
- Region of origin: Georgia

Otar (Georgian: ოთარ) is a Georgian masculine name. Notable people with the name include:

- Otar Barkalaia (born 1984), Georgian rugby player
- Otar Beg Orbeliani (circa. 1583–1662/63), Georgian noble
- Otar Bestaev (born 1991), Kyrgyzstani judoka
- Otar Chiladze (1933-2009), Georgian writer
- Otar Chkhartishvili (born 1950), Georgian naval officer
- Otar Chkheidze (1920–2007), Georgian writer
- Otar Dadunashvili (1928–1992), Georgian-Soviet cyclist
- Otar Eloshvili (born 1978), Georgian rugby player
- Otar Gabelia (born 1953), Georgian footballer
- Otar Giorgadze (born 1996), Georgian rugby player
- Otar Iosseliani (1934–2023), Georgian-French filmmaker
- Otar Japaridze (born 1987), Georgian ice dancer
- Otar Kakabadze (born 1995), Georgian footballer
- Otar Khetsia (born 1965), Abkhaz politician
- Otar Khizaneishvili (born 1981), Georgian footballer
- Otar Koberidze (1924–2015), Georgian actor, film director and screenwriter
- Otar Korgalidze (born 1960), Georgian footballer and football manager
- Otar Korkia (1923–2005), Georgian basketball player and coach
- Otar Kushanashvili (born 1970), Georgian-Russian music journalist and broadcaster
- Otari Kvantrishvili (1948–1994), Georgian organized crime boss
- Otar Lordkipanidze (1930–2002), Georgian archaeologist
- Otar Martsvaladze (born 1984), Georgian footballer
- Otar Patsatsia (1929–2021), Georgian politician, former Prime Minister of Georgia
- Otar Taktakishvili (1924–1989), Georgian composer, teacher, conductor and musicologist
- Otar Turashvili (born 1986), Georgian rugby player
- Otar Tushishvili (born 1978), Georgian wrestler
