= Astana Zhas Ulan Republican School =

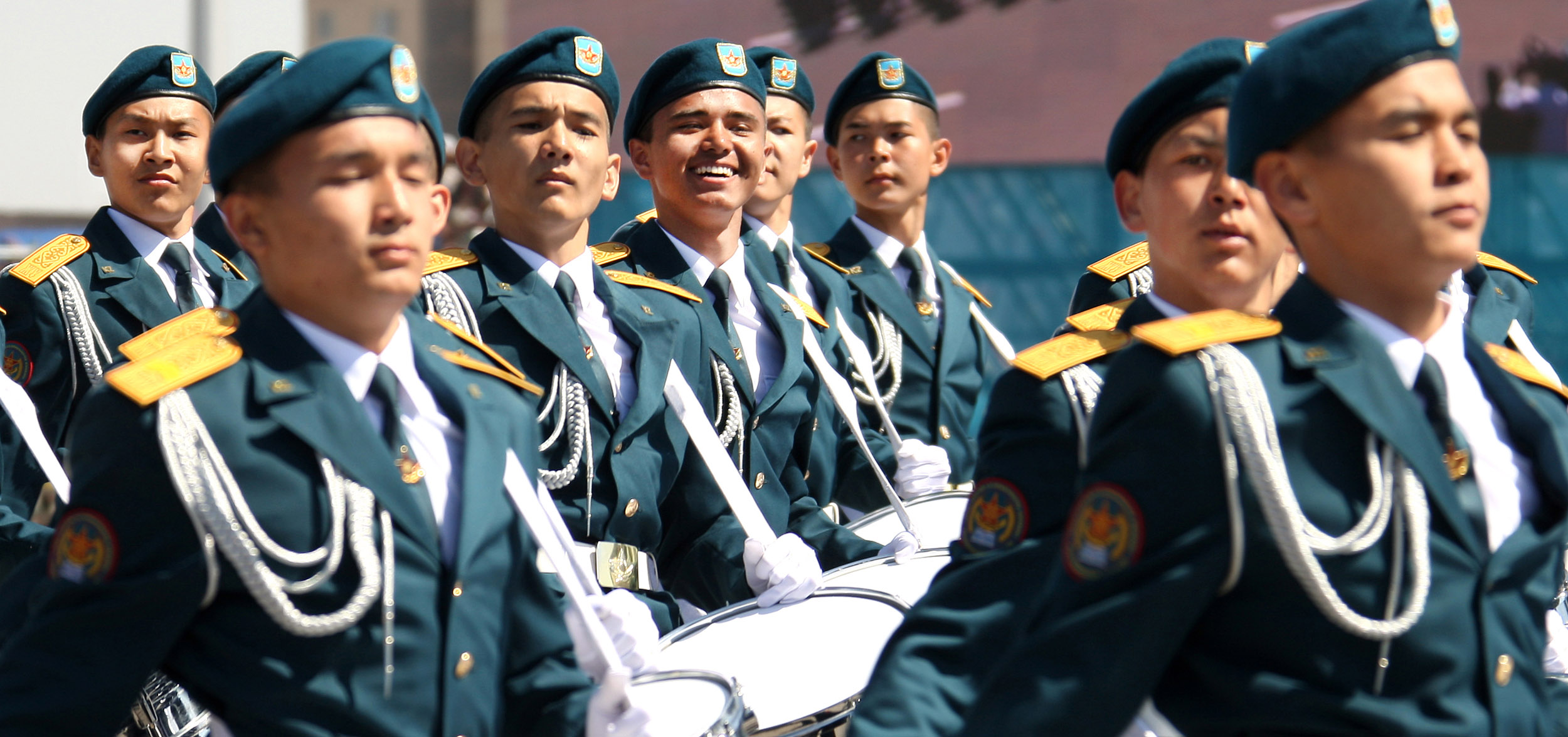
- The Corps of Drums of the school on parade

Address
- Korgalzhyn Highway; Astana; Kazakhstan

Information
- School type: Military preparatory school
- Opened: 1999; 26 years ago
- Founder: President Nursultan Nazarbayev
- Grades: 9 to 12
- Gender: All male
- Enrollment: 1,801 (since its establishment)
- Color(s): Light blue
- Sports: Boxing; wrestling; basketball; volleyball
- Accreditation: Ministry of Defense
- Affiliation: Armed Forces of the Republic of Kazakhstan
- Website: zhasulan.mil.kz/index.php?do=cat&category=main

The Zhas Ulan Republican School named after Sagadat Nurmagambetov (Kazakh: Армия генералы Сағадат Қожахметұлы Нұрмағамбетов атындағы Жас ұлан республикалық мектебі, Armia generally Sağadat Qojahmetūly Nurmaǵambetov atyndağy Jas ūlan respublikalyq mektebi; Russian: Республиканская школа Жас Улан имени Генерала Армии Сагадата Кожахметовича Нурмагамбе́това) also known as the Astana Zhas Ulan Republican School is a military boarding school in Kazakhstan's Armed Forces which specializes in the training of Kazakh youth who want to join the military. It came into existence in 1999, and is named after Army General Sagadat Nurmagambetov, the first Defence Minister of Kazakhstan and one of the most notable Kazakh soldiers who took part in the Battle of Berlin.

== Description ==
On 27 March 1999, the Government of Kazakhstan passed a resolution on the creation of a republican school in Astana. The school was considered to be a way to educate future members of the Kazakh Armed Forces. The school was officially opened on 4 November 1999 in the presence of president Nursultan Nazarbayev and Belarusian president Alexander Lukashenko. In December 2011, the school expanded into a new building.

== Leadership Structure ==
The following people make up the leadership structure of the school:

- Director - Colonel of Justice Tleukhan Bashozhaev
- Assistant director of the school - Lieutenant Colonel Gabit Zhusupaliev
- Head of the educational studies - Lieutenant Colonel Amantai Zharbosynov

== School life ==
=== Purpose ===
The school was founded as a secondary educational institution with in-depth study of the Kazakh language and foreign languages, with enhanced military and physical discipline. Many of the graduates of the school have come to higher military educational institutions of Kazakhstan, Russia, Belarus, Germany, Turkey and other countries.

=== Requirements ===
In order be a cadet at the school, young men must be at least 15 years old at the year of admission. Cadets must also go through a 10-day competition in which they meet the physical requirements of the school. Cadets are also administered a psychological test.

=== Events ===
Since 2010, eighty pupils of the school have taken part in every Constitution Day and every Defender of the Fatherland Day parade in Kazakhstan as part of the Corps of Drums. 80 pupils (pupils of 9-10 form) march behind the color guards during the whole parade.

=== Building ===
In 2012, the Central Military Band of the Ministry of Defense was relocated from the city of Almaty to Astana, with many of the remaining members of the band were housed in the dorms of the Republican School on a temporary basis.

== See also ==
- Military Institute of the Kazakh Ground Forces

== Links ==
- Official Website
