= State Security Service (Kazakhstan) =

Protective service agency of Kazakhstan

State Guard Service of the Republic of Kazakhstan
- Қазақстан Республикасы Мемлекеттік күзет қызметі Qazaqstan Respublikasy Memlekettik küzet qyzmeti
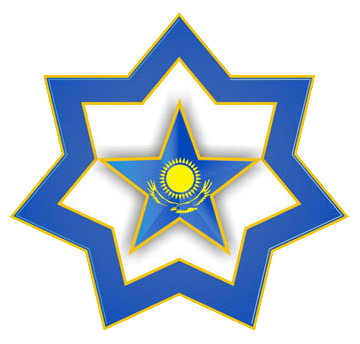
- Seal

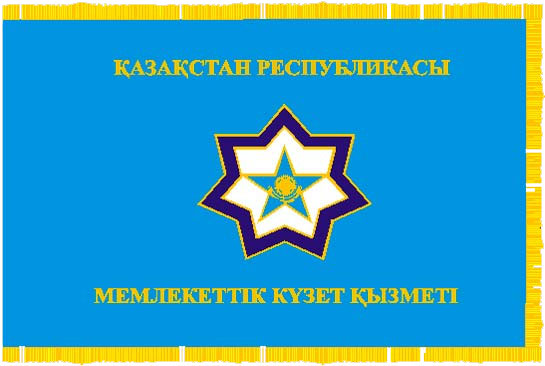
- Flag

Agency overview
- Formed: 21 April 2014
- Preceding agencies: Republican Guard; Presidential Security Service
- Jurisdiction: President of Kazakhstan
- Headquarters: Astana, Kazakhstan
- Agency executive: Colonel Säken Isabekov, Head
- Website: sgork.gov.kz

The State Guard Service of the Republic of Kazakhstan (Kazakh: Қазақстан Республикасы Мемлекеттік күзет қызметі, Qazaqstan Respublikasy Memlekettik küzet qyzmeti) is a protective service agency under commandment of President of Kazakhstan, pertaining to the national security forces. It was established in 2014 on the basis of the Presidential Security Service and the Republican Guard. Its current head is Colonel Säken Isabekov.

== History ==
=== Previous services ===
The Presidential Security Service and the Republican Guard of Kazakhstan were created in 1992 following Kazakhstan's independence from the USSR. Both agencies played a very important role in ensuring state security.

==== Republican Guard ====
The Republican Guard was a former independent service branch of the Armed Forces of the Republic of Kazakhstan. It was one of the most combat-ready units of the Armed Forces. It was established by Nazarbaev on 16 March 1992 on the basis of a brigade of the Kazakh Internal Troops deployed in the village of Aq Zhar (located in the Qaskeleng District of the Almaty Region). Thus, the Day of the Republican Guard has been set as March 16. On 16 December 1992, conscripts were the first to be sworn into the guard in a ceremony at the Park of 28 Panfilov Guardsmen. Two weeks later, it accepted the role of round-the-clock personal security at the Almaty Presidential Residence, which was then under construction.

==== Presidential Security Service ====
In the 1970s, the security system of high officials of the state was improved within the framework of the Ninth Directorate of the Committee for State Security (KGB) of the USSR became one of the most effective special services in the world. Around the same time of these national developments, a Ninth Directorate was created in the structure of the KGB of the Kazakh SSR, which was responsible for protecting First Secretary of the Central Committee of the Communist Party of Kazakhstan Dinmukhammed Qonaev. In 1986, this unit was restructured into a group of several personal security officers. After the election of Nursultan Nazarbaev as the First Secretary in 1989, the 9th branch of the KGB of the Kazakh SSR was created. After independence, the question arose of reorganizing many of the government bodies of the union republic into the governing bodies of an already independent state, and some structures were re-created. By order of the President Nazarbaev dated 6 February 1992, the Presidential Protection Service of the Republic of Kazakhstan (SOP) was created. In October 1995, the Government Communications Agency of the National Security Committee of the Republic of Kazakhstan and the Republican Guard were included in the SOP of the Republic of Kazakhstan, and later they were transferred to independent departments. Major General Sergei Sinitsin was appointed as the first Head of the Security Service of the President of Kazakhstan. It was subordinate to the head of the Presidential Administration and the Cabinet of Ministers of the Republic of Kazakhstan. Subsequently, the Security Service became directly subordinate to the Head of State.

=== Merger ===
The State Guard Service (SGS) was established by the Decree of Kazakhstan's president on 21 April 2014 as a result of a merger of the Presidential Security Service and the Republican Guard. State Security Service Day was officially declared in May 2014 as a professional holiday in order to emphasize the importance of the service. Among the largest of its events that it has provided security for in recent years includes the following: the 5th inauguration of President Nazarbaev and the 2nd inauguration of Qasym-Zhomart Toqaev, the Capital City Day program, the Eurasian Economic Union summit, and the celebration of the 1500th anniversary of Turkestan. After Republican Guard was renamed to Special Purpose Forces of State Guard Service (SPS).

== Structure ==
The Special Purpose Forces (SPS) are one of the most combat-ready units of the Armed Forces. The SPS is composed of:

- Batyr Presidential Regiment (Almaty)
- Aibyn Presidential Regiment (Astana)
  - Honor Guard Company
  - State Symbols Protection Company
- 'Kokzhal' Special Purpose Squad
- Presidential Band
  - Brass Band
  - Ceremonial Band
  - Symphonic Band
  - Folk and Dance ensemble
- Separate Training Battalion (Almaty)
- Separate Logistics Battalion (Astana)
- Hospital Unit

== Official purpose ==
Since its inception, the service has ensured the security of important national and international events, such as the inauguration ceremony of Nursultan Nazarbaev, Capital City Day, summits in Kazakhstan, and many others. It also ensures the security of government officials and V.I.P guests, including the President of Kazakhstan and members of his family. The service has a regiment which serves as a ceremonial unit and maintains a creative musical unit called the Presidential Band.

== See also ==
- Special State Protection Service of Azerbaijan
- Federal Protective Service (Russia)
- Federal Protective Service (United States)
- Presidential Security Service (Belarus)
