= Otar Military Base =

Kazakh military installation

Coordinates: 43°31′09″N 75°16′43″E

40th Otar Military Base «Отар» 40-шы әскери базасының «Otar» 40-shy áskerı bazasynyń 40-й военной базы «Отар»
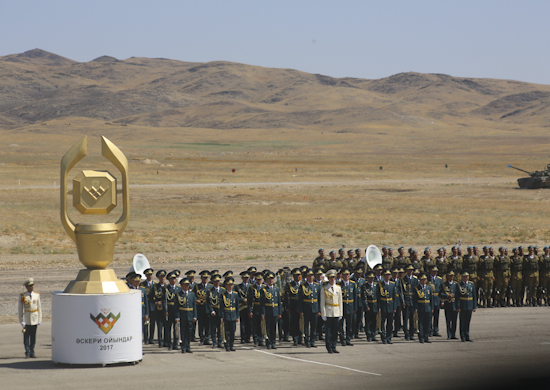
- The Central Military Band of the Ministry of Defense of Kazakhstan performing at the base.

Site information
- Type: Military Base
- Owner: Armed Forces of Kazakhstan
- Controlled by: Kazakh Ground Forces
- Open to the public: No

Site history
- Built: 2002
- Built by: Kazakhstan
- Events: Military exercises

Garrison information
- Current commander: Colonel Talgat Orazaliyev
- Garrison: Zhambyl District, Almaty Region, Kazakhstan
- Occupants: Various armed forces units

Otar Military Base is a military installation of the Armed Forces of Kazakhstan located near Otar, in the Zhambyl District, Almaty Region, Kazakhstan.

== Description ==
Military drills between Kazakhstan and its neighbors such as India, Kyrgyzstan, Mongolia and Russia. On some occasions, Cadets and enlisted personnel, are selected to undergo training at the base. Kazakhstan has held military parades at the military base in May 2013 and May 2018, in order to celebrate the Defender of the Fatherland Day holiday for the first time ever. During the latter parade, a woman was promoted to the rank of General for the first time in Kazakh military history. In early August 2018, the base hosted the Masters of Artillery Fire contest, held during the International Army Games that year.

The base is the home of the Training Center for Junior Specialists of the Kazakh Ground Forces named for Karasai Batyr (Military Unit Number 30212), the former Soviet 80th Guards Training Motor Rifle Division.

== Composition ==
The base hosts the following units:

- Training Center for Junior Specialists of the Kazakh Ground Forces named for Karasai Batyr
- 12th Mechanized Brigade
- 54th Guards Artillery Brigade
- 23rd Engineering and Sapper Brigade
- Central Tank Reserve Base
- Medical Unit
