= Central Military Band of the Ministry of Defense of Kazakhstan =

- (Kazakh): Қазақстан Республикасы Қорғаныс министрлігінің Орталық әскери оркестрі Qazaqstan Respýblıkasy Qorǵanys mınıstriliginiń Ortalyq áskerı orkestri (Russian): Центральный военный оркестр Министерства обороны Республики Казахстан
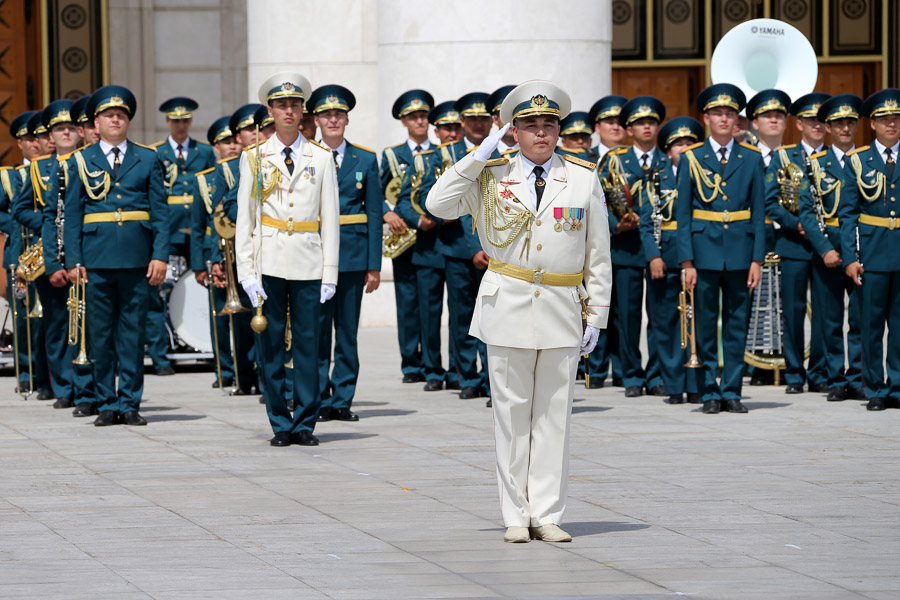
- Active: November 8, 1995 - present
- Country: Kazakhstan
- Branch: Ministry of Defense of Kazakhstan
- Type: Military Band
- Garrison/HQ: Almaty (1995–2012); Astana (2012–present)

Commanders
- Current commander: Major Timur Dzhartibayev
- Chief Composer: Arman Isaliev
- Notable commanders: Colonel Alexander Belyakov

The Central Military Band of the Ministry of Defense of Kazakhstan is a military music unit made for state ceremonies carried out by the Ministry of Defense of Kazakhstan.

== Background ==
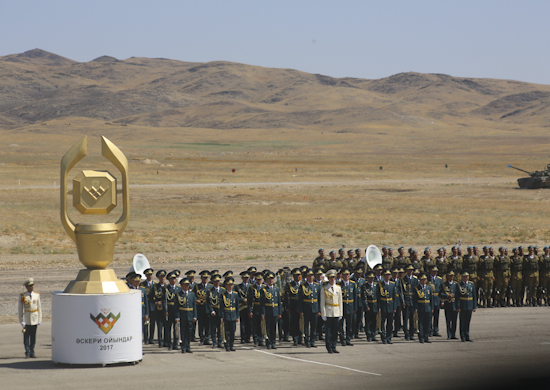
The band performing at Otar Military Base in 2017.

It was formed on November 8, 1995 in accordance with the Directive of the Minister of Defense, Army General Sagadat Nurmagambetov. Shortly after its foundation, Colonel Alexander Belyakov (Russian: Александр Викторович Беляков) joined the band as its senior director. Belyakov was commissioned to lead the band by Nurmagambetov after his role in the Victory Day Parade on Republic Square that year. In 2012, the orchestra was relocated from the city of Almaty to Astana. It was not long after which Belyakov resigned from his post as band director, citing his anger at the fact that regional Kazakh bands were represented at a Defender of the Fatherland Day military band parade while the central band was not represented due to the resignation of 95 musicians as a result of the MoD's order to move the band. According to Belyakov, who headed the military band service for 18 years by that point, he felt ”insulted" by the decision and said he hoped that he is "fired after May 7". The remaining members of the band were housed in the Astana Zhas Ulan Republican School on a temporary basis while the resigning musicians were paid 20 thousand tenge each. Following this period, the new Band of the Ministry of Defense was given a new staff and became is not only an invariable participant of all socially significant events in the republic, but has become essentially an educational and methodological center of the Military Band Service. The band commonly performs during the Astana Day celebrations on Independence Square.

== See also ==
- Presidential Band of the State Security Service of the Republic of Kazakhstan
- Military Band Service (Kazakhstan)
