= List of leaders of Kazakhstan =

== Leaders of Kazakhstan (1917–1990) ==
=== Alash Autonomy (1917–1920) ===
No.	Chairman (birth–death)		Term of office			Political party	Ref
No.	Portrait	Name	Took office	Left office	Time in office	Political party	Ref
1		Alikhan Bukeikhanov; Әлихан Бөкейхан (1866–1937)	13 December 1917	5 March 1920	2 years, 83 days	Alash	—

=== Kirghiz Krai (1919–1920) ===
No.	Chairman (birth–death)		Term of office			Political party	Ref
No.	Portrait	Name	Took office	Left office	Time in office	Political party	Ref
Chairman of the Revolutionary Committee
1		Stanisław Pestkowski; Станислав Пестковский (1882–1937)	10 July 1919	26 August 1920	1 year, 47 days	Communist (Bolsheviks)	—
—		Sakypkerey Argynshiev (Acting); Сақыпкерей Арғыншиев (1887–1938)	August 1920	26 August 1920	<1 month	Communist (Bolsheviks)	—

=== Kirghiz Autonomous Socialist Soviet Republic (1920–1925) ===
No.	Chairman (birth–death)		Term of office			Political party	Ref
No.	Portrait	Name	Took office	Left office	Time in office	Political party	Ref
Chairman of the Revolutionary Committee
1		Stanisław Pestkowski; Станислав Пестковский (1882–1937)	26 August 1920	15 September 1920	20 days	Communist (Bolsheviks)	—
—		Sakypkerey Argynshiev (Acting); Сақыпкерей Арғыншиев (1887–1938)	26 August 1920	September 1920	<1 month	Communist (Bolsheviks)	—
2		Viktor Radus-Zenkovich; Виктор Радус-Зенькович (1877–1967)	15 September 1920	13 October 1920	28 days	Communist (Bolsheviks)	—
Chairman of the Central Executive Committee
3		Seitkali Mendeshev; Виктор Радус-Зенькович (1887–1938)	13 October 1920	19 April 1925	4 years, 188 days	Communist (Bolsheviks)	—
3		Zhalau Mynbayev; Жалау Мыңбаев (1892–1929)	19 April 1925	15 July 1925	87 days	Communist (Bolsheviks)	—

==== Kazakh Autonomous Soviet Socialist Republic (1925–1936) ====
No.	Chairman (birth–death)		Term of office			Political party	Ref
No.	Portrait	Name	Took office	Left office	Time in office	Political party	Ref
Chairman of the Central Executive Committee
1		Zhalau Mynbayev; Жалау Мыңбаев (1892–1929)	15 July 1925	3 April 1927	1 year, 262 days	Communist (Bolsheviks)	—
2		Eltai Yernazarov; Елтай Ерназаров (1887–1945)	3 April 1927	9 January 1935	7 years, 281 days	Communist (Bolsheviks)	—
3		Uzakbai Kulymbetov; Ұзақбай Құлымбетов (1891–1938)	9 January 1935	5 December 1936	1 year, 331 days	Communist (Bolsheviks)	—

=== Kazakh Soviet Socialist Republic (1936–1991) ===
==== First Secretary of the Communist Party ====
No.	Chairman (birth–death)		Term of office			Political party	Ref
No.	Portrait	Name	Took office	Left office	Time in office	Political party	Ref
1		Levon Mirzoyan; Левон Мирзоян (1897–1939)	23 April 1937	23 May 1938	1 year, 30 days	Communist (Bolsheviks)	—
1		Levon Mirzoyan; Левон Мирзоян (1897–1939)	Oversaw early famine relief and collectivization; arrested in 1938 during Great Purge and executed in February 1939.				—
2		Nikolay Skvortsov; Николай Скворцов (1899–1974)	23 May 1938	23 July 1945	7 years, 61 days	Communist (Bolsheviks)	—
2		Nikolay Skvortsov; Николай Скворцов (1899–1974)	Guided the republic through wartime mobilization relocating factories during World War II and post‑war reconstruction.				—
3		Gennady Borkov; Геннадий Борков (1905–1983)	23 July 1945	22 June 1946	334 days	Communist (Bolsheviks)	—
3		Gennady Borkov; Геннадий Борков (1905–1983)	Served briefly in the immediate post‑war period during demobilization; little else is documented about his short tenure.				—
4		Zhumabay Shayakhmetov; Жұмабай Шаяхметов (1902–1966)	22 June 1946	6 February 1954	7 years, 229 days	Communist (Bolsheviks)	—
4		Zhumabay Shayakhmetov; Жұмабай Шаяхметов (1902–1966)	First ethnic Kazakh in the post; removed in February 1954 under Khrushchev's reorganizations amid allegations of corruption.				—
5		Panteleimon Ponomarenko; Пантелеймон Пономаренко (1902–1984)	6 February 1954	7 May 1955	1 year, 90 days	Communist	—
5		Panteleimon Ponomarenko; Пантелеймон Пономаренко (1902–1984)	Transferred from Byelorussian SSR as a transitional figure after Stalin's death; served just over a year before being reassigned.				—
6		Leonid Brezhnev; Леонид Брежнев (1906–1982)	8 May 1955	6 March 1956	303 days	Communist	—
6		Leonid Brezhnev; Леонид Брежнев (1906–1982)	Promoted from Second Secretary to lead Virgin Lands campaign and Baikonur development; recalled to Moscow in March 1956 after disappointing harvests.				—
7		Ivan Yakovlev; Иван Яковлев (1910–1999)	6 March 1956	26 December 1957	1 year, 295 days	Communist	—
7		Ivan Yakovlev; Иван Яковлев (1910–1999)	Elevated from Second to First Secretary during the Khrushchev Thaw; oversaw de‑Stalinization measures and defense‑industry conversion.				—
8		Nikolai Belyaev; Николай Беляев (1903–1966)	26 December 1957	19 January 1960	2 years, 24 days	Communist	—
8		Nikolai Belyaev; Николай Беляев (1903–1966)	Noted for advancing agricultural and economic policies; dismissed in January 1960 due to a downturn in agricultural output and the harsh suppression of the 1959 Temirtau riots.				—
9		Dinmukhamed Kunaev; Дінмұхамед Қонаев (1912–1993)	19 January 1960	26 December 1962	2 years, 341 days	Communist	—
9		Dinmukhamed Kunaev; Дінмұхамед Қонаев (1912–1993)	—				—
10		Ismail Yusupov; Ысмайыл Юсупов (1914–2005)	26 December 1962	7 December 1964	1 year, 347 days	Communist	—
10		Ismail Yusupov; Ысмайыл Юсупов (1914–2005)	Succeeded Kunaev amid Khrushchev's regional reshuffling; initiated the transfer of several South Kazakhstan regions to the Uzbek SSR and was later dismissed at Brezhnev's suggestion.				—
11		Dinmukhamed Kunaev; Дінмұхамед Қонаев (1912–1993)	7 December 1964	16 December 1986	22 years, 9 days	Communist	—
11		Dinmukhamed Kunaev; Дінмұхамед Қонаев (1912–1993)	After a brief hiatus (replaced in 1962), he returned to lead for over 22 years overseeing massive industrialization and former Virgin Lands efforts and was removed in December 1986 by Gorbachev, causing the Jeltoqsan protests.				—
12		Gennady Kolbin; Геннадий Колбин (1927–1998)	16 December 1986	22 June 1989	2 years, 188 days	Communist	—
12		Gennady Kolbin; Геннадий Колбин (1927–1998)	Appointed by Gorbachev as an outsider with no prior work in Kazakhstan; his imposition sparked the Jeltoqsan protests.				—
13		Nursultan Nazarbayev; Нұрсұлтан Назарбаев (1940–)	22 June 1989	28 August 1991	2 years, 67 days	Communist	—
13		Nursultan Nazarbayev; Нұрсұлтан Назарбаев (1940–)	Last First Secretary; oversaw the exclusion of Article 6 (ending one‑party monopoly) on 24 October 1990 and the transition to the Presidency in April 1990 before office was abolished in September 1991.				—

==== Head of state ====
No.	Portrait	Name (Birth–Death)	Term of office			Political party
No.	Portrait	Name (Birth–Death)	Took office	Left office	Time in office	Political party
Chairman of the Central Executive Committee
1		Uzakbai Kulymbetov (1891–1938)	5 December 1936	22 June 1937	199 days	QKP
—		Ismail Salvafeka (?–?); Acting	June 1937	July 1937	~1 month	QKP
2		Alibey Dzhangildin (1884–1953)	July 1937	28 October 1937	~3 months	QKP
3		Nurbapa Umirzakov (1907–1947)	28 October 1937	15 July 1938	260 days	QKP
Chairmen of the Supreme Soviet
4		Salken Daulenov (1907–1984)	15 July 1938	17 July 1938	2 days	QKP
Chairmen of the Presidium of the Supreme Soviet
5		Abdisamet Kazakhpayev (1898–1959)	17 July 1938	January 1947	~8.5 years	QKP
—		Ivan Lukyanets (1902–1994); Acting	January 1947	20 March 1947	~2 months	QKP
6		Daniyal Kerimbayev (1909–1982)	20 March 1947	23 January 1954	6 years, 309 days	QKP
7		Nurtas Undasynov (1904–1989)	23 January 1954	19 April 1955	1 year, 86 days	QKP
8		Zhumabek Tashenev (1915–1986)	19 April 1955	20 January 1960	4 years, 276 days	QKP
9		Fazyl Karibzhanov (1912–1960)	20 January 1960	25 August 1960	218 days	QKP
—		Kapitalina Krykova (1914–2002); Acting	25 August 1960	3 January 1961	131 days	QKP
10		Isagali Sharipov (1906–1976)	3 January 1961	5 April 1965	4 years, 92 days	QKP
11		Sabir Niyazbekov (1912–1989)	5 April 1965	20 December 1978	13 years, 259 days	QKP
12		Isatay Abdukarimov (1924–2001)	20 December 1978	14 December 1979	359 days	QKP
13		Sattar Imashev (1926–1984)	14 December 1979	22 February 1984	4 years, 70 days	QKP
14		Andrey Plotnikov (1912–1991)	22 February 1984	22 March 1984	29 days	QKP
15		Bayken Ashimov (1917–2010)	22 March 1984	27 September 1985	1 year, 189 days	QKP
16		Salamat Mukashev (1927–2004)	27 September 1985	9 February 1988	2 years, 135 days	QKP
17		Zakash Kamalidenov (1939–2017)	9 February 1988	December 1988	~10 months	QKP
18		Vera Sidorova (1934–2025)	December 1988	10 March 1989	~3 months	QKP
19		Makhtay Sagdiyev (1929–2012)	10 March 1989	22 February 1990	349 days	QKP
Chairmen of the Supreme Soviet
20		Nursultan Nazarbayev (born 1940)	22 February 1990	24 April 1990	61 days	QKP

== Presidents of the Republic of Kazakhstan (1990–present) ==
The president of Kazakhstan holds the highest authority in the Republic of Kazakhstan. Established under the Constitution of Kazakhstan, the president is the head of state and as of 2022 is directly elected by the people for a nonrenewable term of seven years. The president appoints the prime minister of Kazakhstan (head of government) and first deputy prime minister. Alongside the prime minister, the president leads the executive branch of the Kazakh government and serves as the commander-in-chief of the Kazakh Armed Forces. Since the establishment of the office of the presidency on 24 April 1990, under the Kazakh Soviet Socialist Republic, Kazakhstan has had only two individuals serve as president. The current president, Kassym-Jomart Tokayev, assumed office on 20 March 2019, following the resignation of Nursultan Nazarbayev, the country's founding president.

Political parties

QKP
Otan → Nur Otan
Amanat
Independent

Symbols

^{C} Constitutional referendum

No.	Portrait	Name (Birth–Death)	Elected	Term of office			Political party
No.	Portrait	Name (Birth–Death)	Elected	Took office	Left office	Time in office	Political party
		Nursultan Nazarbayev (born 1940)	1990; 1991; 1999; 2005; 2011; 2015	24 April 1990	20 March 2019	28 years, 330 days	QKP (1990–1991); Independent (1991–1999); Otan/Nur Otan (1999–2019)
20		Nursultan Nazarbayev (born 1940)	1990; 1991; 1999; 2005; 2011; 2015	24 April 1990	20 March 2019	28 years, 330 days	QKP (1990–1991); Independent (1991–1999); Otan/Nur Otan (1999–2019)
		Kassym-Jomart Tokayev (born 1953)	—	20 March 2019	12 June 2019	84 days	Nur Otan (2019–2022); Amanat (March–April 2022); Independent (since 2022)
21		Kassym-Jomart Tokayev (born 1953)	2019; 2022	12 June 2019	Incumbent	7 years, 106 days	Nur Otan (2019–2022); Amanat (March–April 2022); Independent (since 2022)

Note

Until 16 December 1991 the head of state was called President of the Kazakh Soviet Socialist Republic.

== See also ==
- Politics of Kazakhstan
- President of Kazakhstan
- Prime Minister of Kazakhstan
- Vice President of Kazakhstan
