= Oralbeg Abdu Kerimovic =

Kazakhstani politician

Oralbeg Abdu Kerimovic is the Secretary-General of the Government of Kazakhstan.

The Elazig Governorship in Turkey awarded the Turkic World Service Award to Kazakh President Nursultan Nazarbayev for improving relations between Kazakhstan and Turkey. Secretary-General Kerimovic accepted the award from Governor Muammer Musmal at the Kazakh Presidential Palace in Nur-Sultan on behalf of Nazarbayev, who made an official visit to another country. Kerimovic said, "Turkey is the first country that recognized our independence. And today, both Turkish and Kazakh flags are waving in many buildings in our country. This is an indication of brotherhood." The Akmola Province of Kazakhstan responded to the decision by naming a street "Elazig."
