= Sen-bong (Avangard: Koreyskiy Kolkhoz) =

1946 documentary by Igor Vereshchagin

- Сен-бонг (Авангард: корейский колхоз)
- Directed by: Igor Vereshchagin
- Narrated by: L. Korobchenko
- Music by: Yevgeny Brusilovsky (composer and arranger); Li Ham-dek (singer); Li Nikolai (singer)
- Production company: Alma-Ata Film Studios
- Release date: 1946
- Country: Soviet Union
- Language: Russian

Sen-bong (Avangard: Koreyskiy Kolkhoz) (Russian: Сен-бонг (Авангард: корейский колхоз), lit. 'Vanguard (Vanguard: Korean Kolkhoz)') is a 1946 Soviet-Kazakh documentary film.

Its subject is Avangard, a kolkhoz in the Kazakh SSR, founded in 1936 by Koryo-saram who had been relocated from a previous kolkhoz. The documentary is the first Soviet film about Koryo-saram after their mass deportations from their original homes in the Soviet Far East in 1937.

According to Kazakhstanskaya Pravda, Sen-bong is one of the documentary films to have "justly taken its place in the golden trove of Kazakh documentary filmmaking".
