= Gennady Borkov =

Soviet politician

- Геннадий Борков

Deputy Minister of Agriculture of the USSR
- In office August 1955 – March 1960

First Secretary of the Central Committee of the Communist Party of Kazakhstan
- In office 13 July 1945 – 22 July 1946
- Preceded by: Nikolay Skvortsov
- Succeeded by: Zhumabay Shayakhmetov

Personal details
- Born: 30 March 1905 Rybinsky Uyezd, Yaroslavl Governorate, Russian Empire
- Died: 25 February 1983 (aged 77) Moscow, Soviet Union
- Resting place: Novodevichy Cemetery
- Party: CPSU

Gennady Andreevich Borkov (Russian: Геннадий Андреевич Борков; 30 March 1905 – 25 February 1983) was a Soviet politician who served as the First Secretary of the Communist Party of the Kazakh SSR from 13 July 1945 to 22 July 1946.

== Biography ==
Gennedy Borkov was born on 30 March 1905, in Rybinsky Uyezd, Yaroslavl Governorate, and studied at the Moscow Timiryazev Agricultural Academy from 1927 to 1934, and attended graduate school from 1934 to 1935 but did not complete it. Between 1919 and 1930, he was engaged in Komsomol and party work in the Yaroslavl and Ivanovo provinces.

From 1935 to 1937, he worked in the department of scientific and technical inventions and discoveries at the Central Committee of the VKP(b). He served as the First Secretary of the Central Committee of the Communist Party of Kazakhstan from 1945 to 1946.

He served as the Deputy Minister of Agriculture of the USSR from 1955 to 1960. He was a member of the Central Committee of the VKP(b)/CPSU from 1939 to 1956 and a deputy of the Supreme Soviet of the USSR in its first four convocations. He was retired in March 1960. Borkov died on 25 February 1983, and buried in Novodevichy Cemetery.

== Awards ==
Order of Lenin, two times (22 July 1942; 16 November 1944)
Order of the October Revolution (28 March 1975)
Order of the Red Banner of Labor
Order of the Badge of Honour (29 March 1965)
