= Kunaev Home Museum =

Memorial museum in Kazakhstan

Coordinates: 43°15′07″N 76°56′55″E

- Established: 2002
- Location: 117 Tölebaev Street, Almaty, Kazakhstan
- Website: kunayev.kz

Kunaev Home Museum (Kazakh: Қонаев үй-музейі, romanized: Qonaev üi-muzeiı; Russian: Дом-музей Кунаева, romanized: Dom-muzei Kunaeva) is a memorial museum and memorial apartments of the politician and First Secretary of the Communist Party of Kazakhstan Dinmukhamed Kunaev in Almaty, Kazakhstan.

== History ==
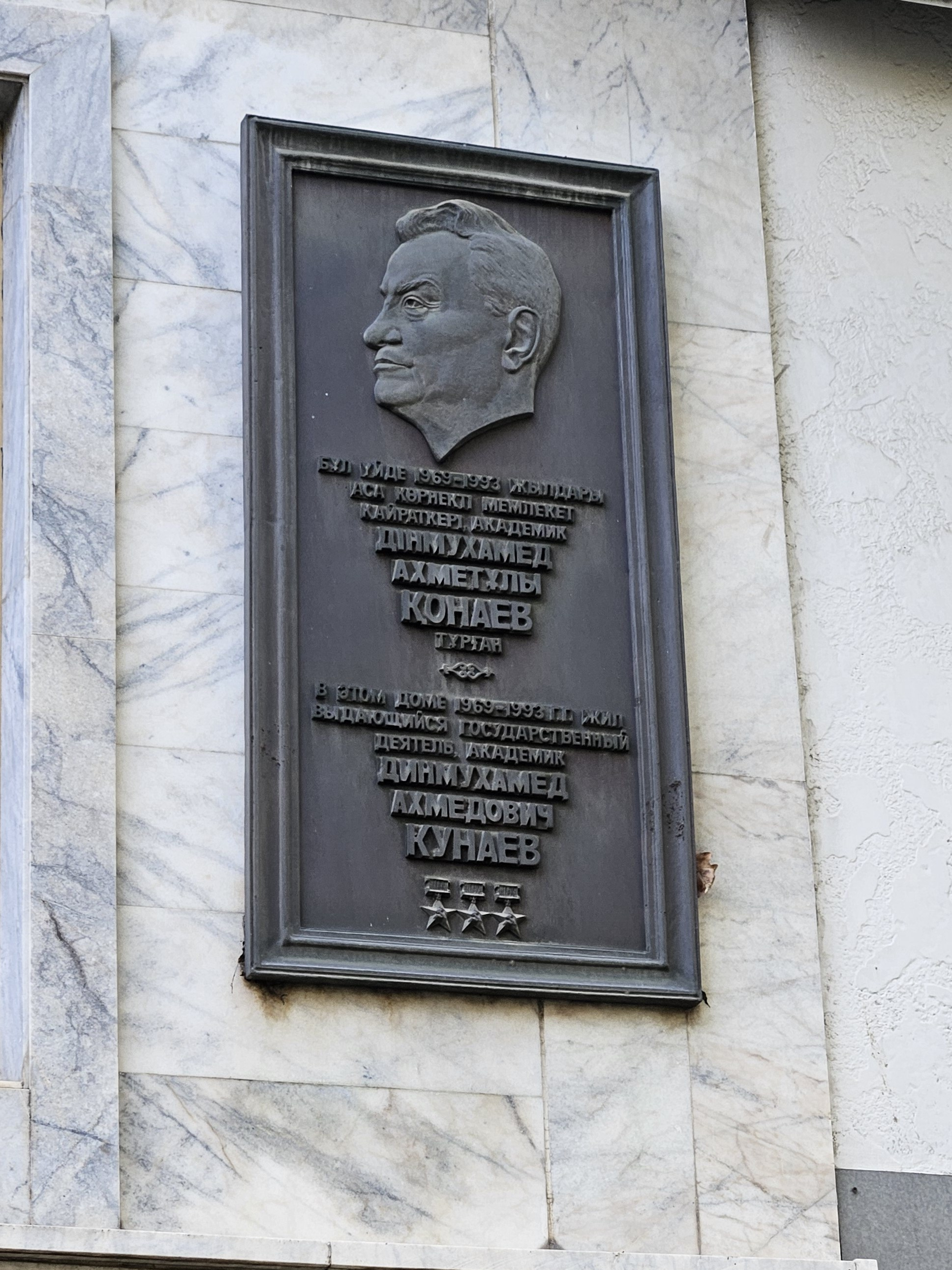
Kunaev plaque at the Home Museum

The museum consists of two areas: the D. A. Kunaev museum, and the memorial apartments.

=== Museum ===
Museum contains three galleries devoted to Dinmukhamed Kunaev's life and activities. The museum was opened in 2002 on the 90th anniversary of Kunaev's birth in premises provided for this purpose at 177 Tölebaev Street.

The basis for the creation of the museum was a collection of family memoirs received from relatives: documents, photos, video materials, portraits and household items. Later they were supplemented with contributions from Kunaev's friends and associates. Expositions of the museum show Kunaev's progress from a mining engineer to First Secretary of the Communist Party of Kazakhstan. The museum collections hold about 3,000 exhibits relating to Kunaev's life, and contain materials on the history of Kazakhstan. The exhibition is housed in two halls with a total area of 210 square meters.

=== Memorial apartment ===
In 2012, the 100th anniversary of Kunaev's birth, the apartments which he had lived in between 1969 and 1993 were opened to the public. After Kunaev's death, the apartments were inhabited by his nephew, Diyar Kunaev, who preserved them much as they were when his uncle lived there.

The 230-square-meter apartment features Kunaev's home library of 7,000 books, and a smaller collection of more than 400 copies, personal items and gifts. The museum exhibition consists of four rooms: Kunaev's office, living room, bedroom and kitchen.

In first quarter of 2022 the museum was closed for reconstruction and on 19 April 2022, was reopened after reconstruction was completed.
