= Levon Mirzoyan =

Soviet politician (1897–1939)

- Լևոն Միրզոյան
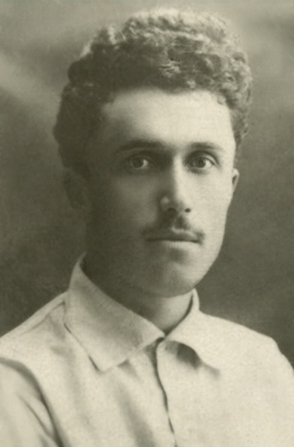
- Mirzoyan, early 1920s

First Secretary of the Central Committee of the Communist Party of Kazakhstan
- In office 5 December 1936 – 3 May 1938
- Preceded by: Position established
- Succeeded by: Nikolay Skvortsov

Secretary of the Kazakh Regional Committee of the All-Union Communist Party
- In office February 1933 – 5 December 1936
- Preceded by: Filipp Goloshchyokin
- Succeeded by: Position abolished

First Secretary of the Central Committee of the Communist Party of the Azerbaijan
- In office 21 January 1926 – 5 August 1929
- Preceded by: Sergei Kirov
- Succeeded by: Nikolay Gikalo

Personal details
- Born: Levon Isayevich Mirzoyan; 14 November 1897 Ashan, Shusha uezd, Elisabethpol Governorate, Russian Empire
- Died: 26 February 1939 (aged 41) Moscow, Soviet Union
- Party: Russian Communist Party (1917-1938)
- Spouse: Yulia Tevossian
- Awards: Order of Lenin

Levon Isayevich Mirzoyan (Armenian: Լևոն Եսայիի Միրզոյան; Russian: Левон Исаевич Мирзоян; 14 November 1897 – 26 February 1939) was the First Secretary of the Central Committee of the Communist Party of the Azerbaijan from 21 January 1926 to 5 August 1929 and the First Secretary of the Central Committee of the Communist Party of Kazakhstan from 1933 to May 1938. He succeeded Filipp Goloshschyokin as leader during the Soviet-imposed Kazakh Famine of 1930–1933, also known as the Goloshchyokin Genocide, in which at least 1.3 million ethnic Kazakhs died, an estimated 38 to 42 percent of all Kazakhs: the highest percentage of any ethnic group killed by the Soviet famine of 1930–1933. Historians have mixed evaluations of his term, both as a perpetrator of brutal policies against starving Kazakhs and the man who oversaw the nation's recovery.

== Biography ==
Mirzoyan was born in the village of Ashan in Shusha uezd of the Elisabethpol Governorate to an Armenian peasant family. In 1917, he joined the Russian Social Democratic Labour Party (RSDLP). In 1926–1929, he was the First Secretary of the Communist Party of Azerbaijan. In 1929–1933, he was the Secretary of the Perm Regional Committee, then the Second Secretary of the Ural Regional Committee of the Communist Party of the Soviet Union (CPSU). In 1933, he became the Secretary of the Kazakh Regional Committee of the All-Union Communist Party. In 1937, he became the First Secretary of the Central Committee of the Communist Party of Kazakhstan. He was a member of the CEC of the USSR.

As Secretary of the Communist Party of Kazakhstan, he was the successor of Filipp Goloshchyokin during the last year of the Soviet-imposed Kazakh Famine of 1930–1933, also known as the 'Goloshchyokin genocide' by some scholars. As a result of the famine, an estimated 1.3 million ethnic Kazakhs died, around 38 to 42 percent of the entire Kazakh population. Shortly after his arrival, Mirzoyan announced that those who fled or stole grain were 'enemies' of the Soviet Union, and that the republic would take 'severe measures' against them. However, as historian Sarah Cameron notes, this definition could be extended to every starving refugee in the country. With this campaign, Mirzoyan pushed for the use of brutal punishment such as shootings.

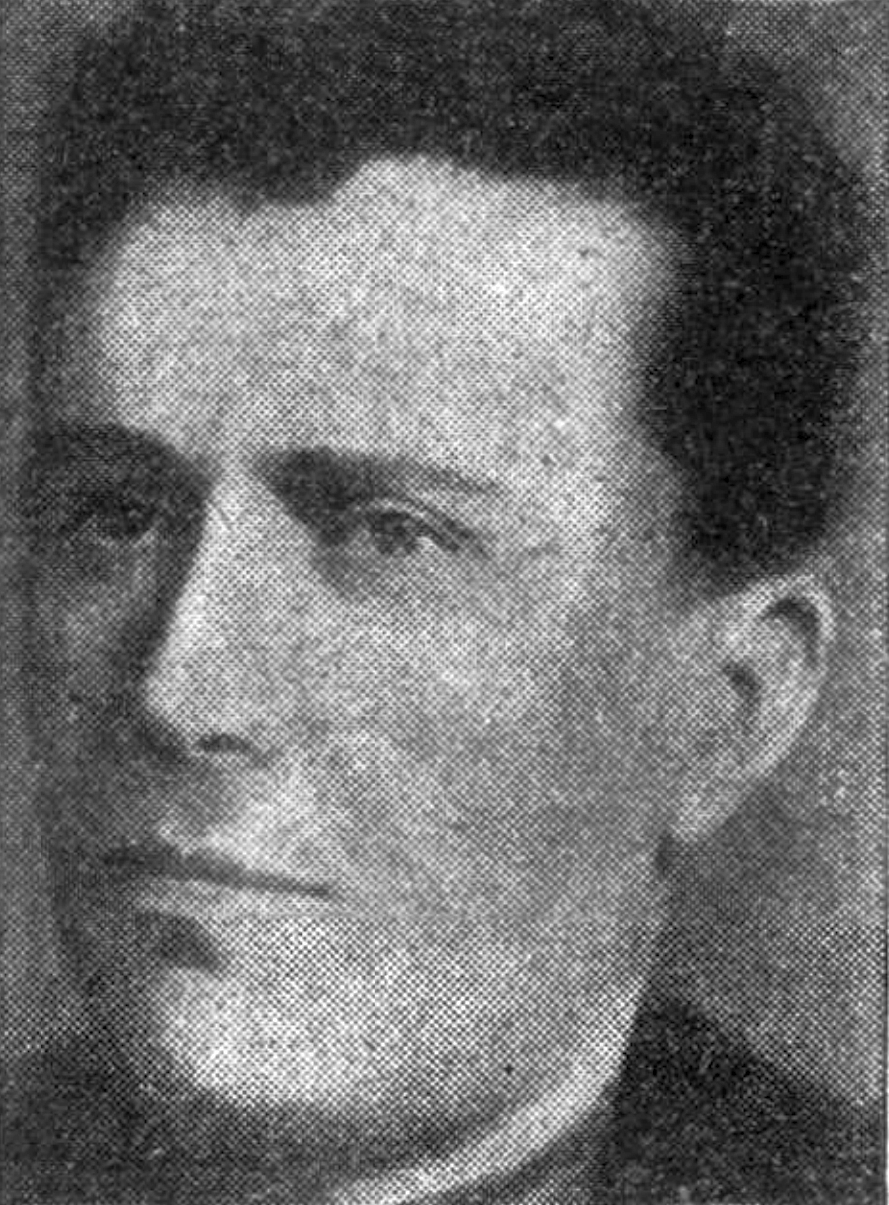
Mirzoyan in 1938

Although Mirzoyan oversaw Kazakhstan's recovery from the famine, he was noted to be repressive particularly toward famine refugees and denied food aid to areas run by cadres who asked for more food for their regions using "teary telegrams". He also fired many of the cadres for asking for more food aid, and denied their regions further assistance in retaliation. In one instance under Mirzoyan's rule, a plenipotentiary shoved food aid documents into his pocket and had a wedding celebration instead of transferring them for a whole month while hundreds of Kazakhs starved. Historian Sarah Cameron describes it in an interview with Harvard University's Davis Center, "[in] a strategy explicitly modeled upon a technique that was used against starving Ukrainians, several regions of Kazakhstan were blacklisted. That essentially entraps starving Kazakhs in zones of death where no food could be found." Mirzoyan's tenure benefited "ultimately, from good luck", as there was excellent weather alongside a large harvest in 1934 which marked the end of the famine.

During the Great Purge, Mirzoyan took the initiative in uncovering what he alleged were 'counter-revolutionary right wing and Trotskyist organisations' in Kazakhstan. On 27 July 1937, he sent a telegram to Joseph Stalin naming the Chairman of the Kazakh Central Executive Committee (ie the titular President of Kazakhstan) Uzakbay Kulumbetov as a leader of the conspiracy, and seeking permission to have him arrested, on which Stalin wrote "no objections". Kulumbetov was arrested and shot.

In 1938, Mirzoyan sent a telegram to Stalin and Vyacheslav Molotov, in which he expressed his disagreement with the decision to move the Koreans deported to Kazakhstan in 1936 from Primorye, in the southern part of the republic, to the north, where they could not engage in rice cultivation. He also expressed his doubts about the working methods of the NKVD (the Soviet secret service later known as the KGB). In the summer of 1938, Mirzoyan was arrested and detained in Lefortovo Prison in Moscow. On 26 February 1939, he was executed. He was rehabilitated in 1958.
