= Qizil Tugh =

Soviet Uyghur newspaper (1935–1938)

- Owner(s): Alma-Ata Regional Committee of the Communist Party (Bolsheviks) of Kazakhstan, Alma-Ata Regional Executive Committee
- Editor: I. Tairov; N. Sharipov; M. Abdullin (Mukhpul)
- Founded: October 24, 1935
- Ceased publication: April 11, 1938
- Political alignment: Communism
- Language: Uyghur language
- City: Alma-Ata
- Country: Soviet Union
- Circulation: 3,000
- Sister newspapers: Pravda; Kazakhstanskaya Pravda; Sotsialistik Kazakhstan

Qizil Tugh (Uyghur: Қизил туғ, lit. 'red banner') was a Uyghur-language newspaper published from Alma-Ata, Soviet Union, from 1935 to 1938. It was an organ of the Communist Party (Bolsheviks) of Kazakhstan. While following the party line and disseminating Communist propaganda, it also provided a publishing platform for young Uyghur language poets and writers in the Soviet Union.

== History ==
The publication was initially named Qizil Bairaq (also meaning 'Red Banner'). It was an organ of the Alma-Ata Regional Committee of the Communist Party of Kazakhstan and the Alma-Ata Regional Executive Committee. Qizil Tugh appeared three times a week, and had a circulation of 3,000 copies. The first issue was published on October 26, 1935. The editors of Qizil Tugh, at different times, were I. Tairov, N. Sharipov and M. Abdullin (Mukhpul).

The launch of Qizil Tugh was a milestone in development of Uyghur language-press and Uyghur culture in the Soviet Kazakhstan. The publication strictly followed the party line, and carried out propaganda work towards the Uyghur community. The newspaper was part of the campaign to complete the Second Five-Year Plan in four years and agitated in favour of the Stakhanovite movement to increase production outputs. The ideological line of the newspaper was derived from publications such as Pravda, Kazakhstanskaya Pravda and Sotsialistik Kazakhstan.

Qizil Tugh provided a publishing platform for young Uyghur poets and writers, and carried literary critique articles on Uyghur-language works. The newspaper published poems by Izim Iskanderov, Qadir Hasanov, H. Turdi, Nasreddin Mansurov, I. Rozi and Ismayil Sattarov. The latter made his literary debut in the pages of Qizil Tugh in 1936.

The last issue of Qizil Tugh was published on April 11, 1938.
