= Park View Office Tower =

Coordinates: 43°15′28.1″N 76°56′58.5″E

- Interactive map of the Park View Office Tower area

General information
- Status: Completed
- Architectural style: Contemporary modern
- Location: Almaty, Kazakhstan, Kunayev St. 77
- Construction started: 2006
- Completed: 2010

Height
- Height: 62 m (203 ft)

Technical details
- Floor count: 16
- Floor area: 16,500 m^{2} (178,000 sq ft)

Design and construction
- Architect: Space Group Architects Inc.

Other information
- Parking: yes

Park View Office Tower is a 16-floor office building located near Park Panfilov on Kunayev Street in Almaty, Kazakhstan. It is considered the first green building in Central Asia. The building has a canteen, food court, restaurant, cafeteria facilities, a hi-tech meeting conference room, and free Wi-Fi.
