= Zhumabek Tashenev =

Soviet politician

Jumabek Tashenov
- Жұмабек Ташенов
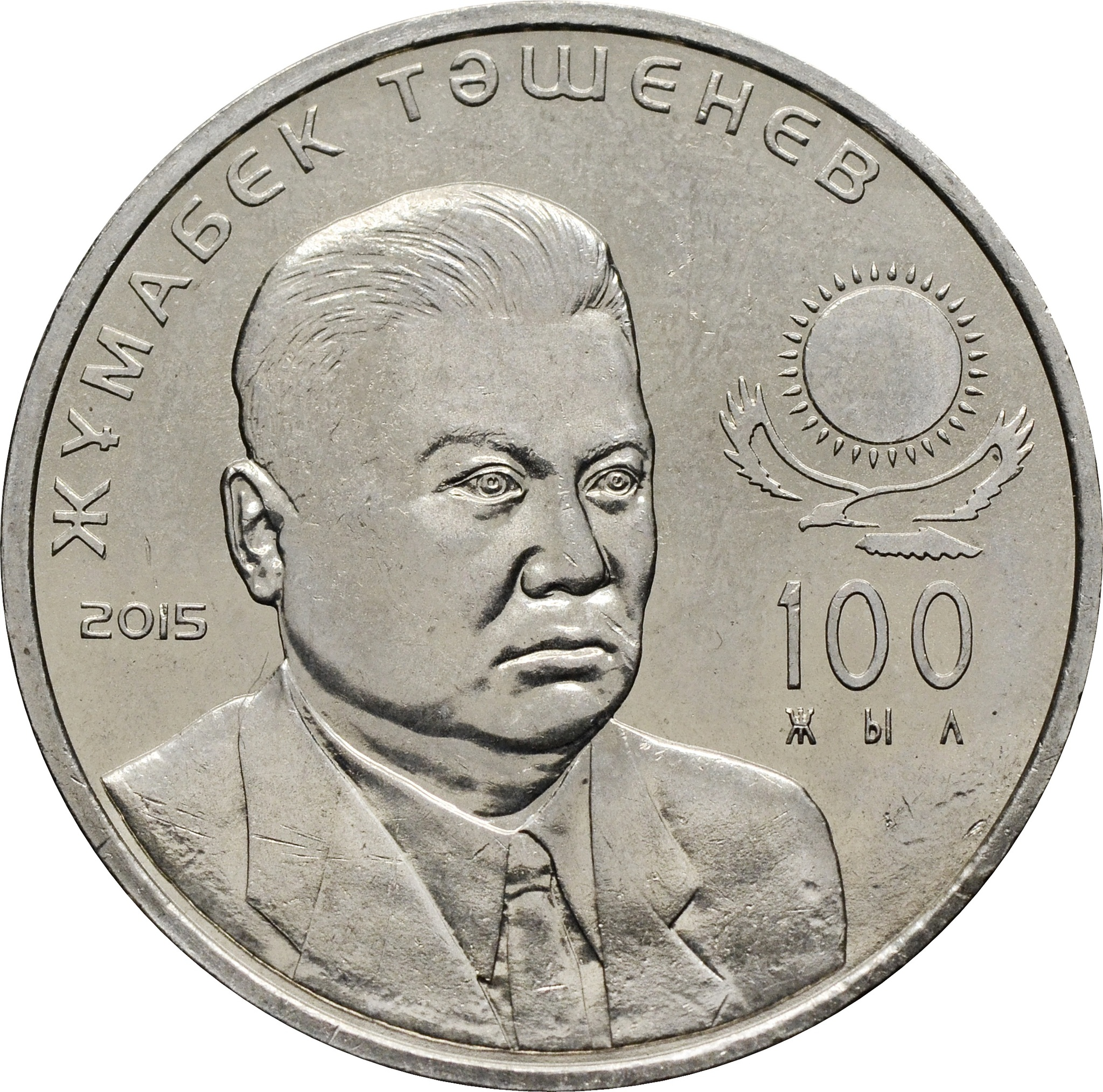
- Tashenov depicted on a 50 tenge coin, 2015

Chairman of the Council of Ministers of the Kazakh SSR
- In office 20 January 1960 – 6 January 1961
- Preceded by: Dinmukhamed Kunayev
- Succeeded by: Salken Daulenov

Chairman of the Presidium of the Supreme Soviet of the Kazakh SSR
- In office 19 April 1955 – 20 January 1960
- Preceded by: Ibragim Tazhiyev
- Succeeded by: Elubay Taybekov

First Secretary of Aktyubinsk Regional Committee of the Communist Party of Kazakhstan
- In office January 1952 – April 1954
- Preceded by: Muhamedgali Suzhikov
- Succeeded by: Pavel Delvin

Chairman of the North Kazakhstan Regional Ispolkom
- In office December 1948 – January 1952
- Preceded by: Ivan Skvortsov
- Succeeded by: Kabash Uspanov

Personal details
- Born: Zhumabek Akhmetovich Tashenov; 20 March 1915 Tanagul, Akmolinsk Oblast, Russian Empire
- Died: 18 November 1986 (aged 71) Chimkent, Chimkent Region, Kazakh SSR, Soviet Union
- Party: CPSU
- Spouse: Bätes Älimbaeva (m. 1941)
- Education: Akmolinsk Railroad Construction Tekhnikum; Higher Party School

Jūmabek Ahmetūly Täşenov (Note: Often transliterated through as Zhumabek Akhmetovich Tashenov through the Russified Romanization of Russian: Жумабек Ахметович Ташенов. During his lifetime, Tashenov was likely official rendered as Tashenev (Russian: Ташенев)) (Kazakh: Жұмабек Ахметұлы Ташенов; 20 March 1915 – 18 November 1986) was a Soviet politician, who served as Chairman of the Council of Ministers of the Kazakh SSR from 1960 to 1961 and Chairman of the Presidium of the Supreme Soviet of the Kazakh SSR from 1955 to 1960.

Tashenov was a member of the Central Committee of the Communist Party of the Soviet Union. In 1962, he earned a Ph.D. in Economics.

== Biography ==
Tashenov was born on March 20, 1915, in the village Tanaköl, Akmolinsk Oblast, Russian Empire (present-day Babatai village, Arshaly District, Akmola Region). He came from the Altai-Qarpyq clan from the Argyn tribe of the Middle jüz.

A descendant of the Northern Kazakhs near present-day Astana and member of a middle class family, Tashenov was one of six children.

His father, Zhaksybay Tashen (Note: Now transliterated from Kazakh as Jaqsybai Täşen) was a handyman in the nearby village of Martynovka from 1917 to 1924. In 1931, he died. His mother, Gulsum, owned a small property alongside her husband.

Though his father's name is Zhaksybay, Tashenov's patronymic is officially recorded as Akhmetovich. According to Dametken Zheng, following Kazakh customs, Tashenov and his brother Manap were adopted by their father's brother Ahmet after Zhaksybay's death.

In 1928, Tashenov became a member of the Komsomol. The same year, he attended a peasant youth school, which he completed in 1932. On the proposition by his brother Manap, he was admitted to a construction college in 1933. Having interrupted his studies in 1934, he worked for four months at the Akmolinsk District Executive Committee, and in October, was appointed Executive Secretary of the Executive Committee of the newly-formed Krasnoarmeysky District of the Kokchetav Oblast.

In 1934, Tashenov was hired by the District Committee of the (Vishnevsky) Arshaly District, and then moved to work in the Krasnoarmeysky District Executive Committee of the North Kazakhstan Region. In 1934, Tashenov entered the civil service, where he worked until 28 May 1975. In 1940, he was accepted into the ranks of the CPSU. From 1934 to 1944, Tashenov worked in different positions of Akmola, Karaganda and North Kazakhstan regions. On 27 August 1939, he was appointed head of the Land Department of Beynetkorsky district (present-day Magzhan Zhumabayev District). He held the position until August 1942.

On 8 October 1939, Tashenov was appointed head of the Beinetkor District. From there, he held various positions, and on 22 March 1947, on behalf of Central Committee of the Communist Party of the Soviet Union, he became First Deputy Chairman of the Executive Committee of the North Kazakhstan Regional Council of Workers' Deputies.

In 1951, Tashenov was elected as a member of the Supreme Soviet of the Kazakh Soviet Socialist Republic. Starting from next year, he attended the Higher Party School, and additionally worked as First Secretary of the Aktobe Regional Party Committee until 1955. In April 1955, he became the Chairman of the Presidium of the Supreme Soviet of the Kazakh SSR.

In 1956, he was elected member of the Supreme Soviet of the Soviet Union. In 1960, he started leading Kazakhstan's local government as Chairman of the Council of Ministers. Under his leadership, streets were renamed and the Abai Qunanbaiuly monument of Alma-Ata by Hakimjan Nauryzbaev was installed.

At the end of 1960, Tashenov famously opposed the creation of the Tselinny Krai administrative region from the Virgin Lands campaign, which, as proposed, would have comprised the five Northern Kazakh Oblasts and separated from the Kazakh SSR. Tashenov suggested that the idea, which was promoted by Nikita Khrushchev, went against the 1936 Constitution of the Soviet Union. He was also a leading oppositionist to the relocation of the Mangyshlak Region away from Kazakhstan, also proposed by Khrushchev. From 1961, Tashenov was demoted to lower, more local position in South Kazakhstan.

In 1975, Tashenov retired. Outside of politics, he did research. He died on 18 November 1986 and was buried in Shymkent.

== Personal life ==
Tashenov married Bätes Tashenova (née Älimbaeva) in 1941. In 1942, their firstborn, Sayan, was born.
