= Nikolai Belyaev (politician) =

Soviet politician; First Secretary of the Communist Party of Kazakhstan (1903–1966)

- Николай Беляев

First Secretary of the Communist Party of the Kazakh SSR
- In office 26 December 1957 – 16 January 1960
- Preceded by: Ivan Yakovlev
- Succeeded by: Dinmukhamed Kunayev

First Secretary of the Stavropol Regional Committee of the Communist Party of the Soviet Union
- In office 28 January – 25 June 1960
- Preceded by: Ivan Lebedev
- Succeeded by: Fyodor Kulakov

Full member of the 20th Presidium
- In office 29 July 1957 – 4 May 1960

Member of the 19th, 20th Secretariat
- In office 12 July 1955 – 12 November 1958

Personal details
- Born: 1 February [O.S. 19 January] 1903 Kuterem, Ufa Governorate, Russian Empire
- Died: 28 October 1966 (aged 63) Moscow, Soviet Union
- Party: Communist Party of the Soviet Union (1925–1960)
- Profession: Civil servant

Nikolai Ilyich Belyaev (Russian: Николай Ильич Беляев; 19 January (1 February) 1903 – 28 October 1966) was a Soviet politician. Between 1955 and 1958, he was a Secretariat of the Central Committee of the Communist Party of the Soviet Union.

== Biography ==
Belyaev was born in the village Kuterem of Ufa Governorate in Siberia in a family of a Russian peasant. While studying in a secondary school he began his political career as a Komsomol activist. In 1925 he graduated from the Plekhanov Russian University of Economics in Moscow and returned to Siberia where he served as a Communist Party functionary for the next 30 years. His efforts in the expansion of agriculture in Siberia were noticed by Nikita Khrushchev. As a result, in 1955 Belyaev became one of the secretaries of the Central Committee of the Communist Party of the Soviet Union. During the 1957 attempt by Malenkov, Molotov and Kaganovich to demote Khrushchev, Belyaev defended the party leader, for which he was elected to the Presidium of the Supreme Soviet and became the First Secretary of the Central Committee of the Communist Party of Kazakhstan. His was dismissed from both positions in 1960 due to the decline in agriculture and, more importantly, due to the poor handling of the 1959 riots in Temirtau that resulted in more than 10 people shot dead and several dozens prosecuted. He was sent to Stavropol Krai where he worked with Mikhail Gorbachev. According to Gorbachev, after the demotion Belyaev lost all enthusiasm; he retired from active duties in 1960 and died on October 28, 1966. He was buried at the Novodevichy Cemetery in Moscow.

== Awards ==
1945 – Order of the Red Star
