= Mukhtar Shakhanov =

Kazakhstani writer (1942–2026)

Mūhtar Şahanov
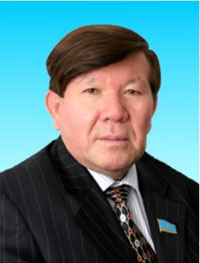
- Official Mäjilis portrait, 2007
- Native name: Мұхтар Шаханов
- Born: 2 July 1942 Otrar, Chimkent Oblast, Kazakh SSR, Soviet Union
- Died: 19 April 2026 (aged 83)
- Occupation: Writer; poet; politician; diplomat

Mūhtar Şahanov (Note: Often transliterated as Mukhtar Shakhanov through a Russified Romanization of Мухтар Шаханов.) (Kazakh: Мұхтар Шаханов; 2 July 1942 – 19 April 2026) was a Kazakh writer, politician and diplomat who was the Kazakh ambassador to Kyrgyzstan. He was also a Member of the Mäjilis, and editor-in-chief of the magazine Jalyn.

== Life and career ==
Şahanov was born in Otrar on 2 July 1942. He became well known in Kazakhstan for his articles that raised public awareness about the need for the protection of the Aral Sea, earning him worldwide recognition. He also led the commission on Jeltoqsan tragedy.

Şahanov died on 19 April 2026, at the age of 83.
