= Dinmukhamed Kunaev =

Soviet politician; First Secretary of the Communist Party of Kazakhstan (1911–1993)

Dinmukhamed Kunayev
- Дінмұхаммед Қонаев
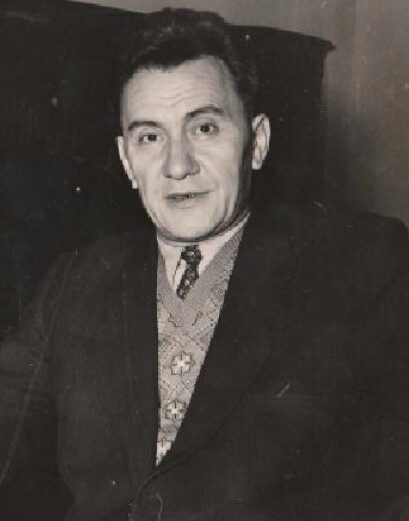
- Kunayev in 1952

First Secretary of the Communist Party of Kazakhstan
- In office 7 December 1964 – 16 December 1986
- Preceded by: Ismail Yusupov
- Succeeded by: Gennady Kolbin
- In office 19 January 1960 – 26 December 1962
- Preceded by: Nikolay Belyayev
- Succeeded by: Ismail Yusupov

Chairman of the Council of Ministers of the Kazakh SSR
- In office 26 December 1962 – 7 December 1964
- Preceded by: Masymkhan Beysembayev
- Succeeded by: Masymkhan Beysembayev
- In office 31 March 1955 – 29 January 1960
- Preceded by: Elubay Taibekov
- Succeeded by: Zhumabek Tashenev

Full member of the 24th, 25th, 26th, 27th Politburo
- In office 9 April 1971 – 28 January 1987

Candidate member of the 23rd Politburo
- In office 8 April 1966 – 9 April 1971

Personal details
- Born: 12 January 1912 Verny, Semirechye Oblast, Russian Empire (now Almaty, Kazakhstan)
- Died: 22 August 1993 (aged 81) Almaty, Kazakhstan
- Resting place: Kensai Cemetery
- Party: CPSU (1939–1989)
- Spouse: Zukhra Sharipovna Yalymova (m. 1918; died 1990)
- Education: Moscow Institute of Non-Ferrous Metals and Gold
- Profession: Mining engineer

Dınmūhammed Ahmetūly Qonaev (Note: Often transliterated as Dinmukhamed Akhmetovich Kunayev through a Russified Romanization of Динмухамед Ахмедович Кунаев.) (Kazakh: Дінмұхаммед Ахметұлы Қонаев; 12 January 1912 [O.S. 31 December 1911] – 22 August 1993) was a Soviet Communist politician, who served as the First Secretary of the Communist Party of the Kazakh SSR.

== Early life ==
=== Origins ===
His grandfather was Zhumabai (kaz. Jumabai) (–1912). His father, Minliakhmed (Akhmed) Zhumabaievich (kaz. Meŋlıahmed Jumabaiūly) (1886–1976), was literate, worked in agricultural and trade organizations of the Alma-Ata oblast and could write well in both Russian and Kazakh. His mother, Zaure Baiyrovna Kunayeva (née Shynbolatova (Chimbulatova)) (kaz. Zaure Baiypqyzy Qonaeva) (1888–1973), was born in a poor family in the Shelek aul, Almaty oblast. They lived together for 70 years. There are claims that Kunayevmight possibly come from the oiyq branch of the Ysty tribe, Senior juz. In his "From Stalin to Gorbachev" book, he mentioned that his "ancestors come from the Baidıbek, jigit of the Senior juz". According to the official biography, he is ethnically Kazakh and his ancestors were hunters, that lived on the coasts of Ili River and Kürtı rivers of the Balkhash District in the aul Bakanas. Kunayev, the son of a Kazakh clerk, was born at Verny, now Almaty, and grew up in a middle-income family.

== Rise to power ==
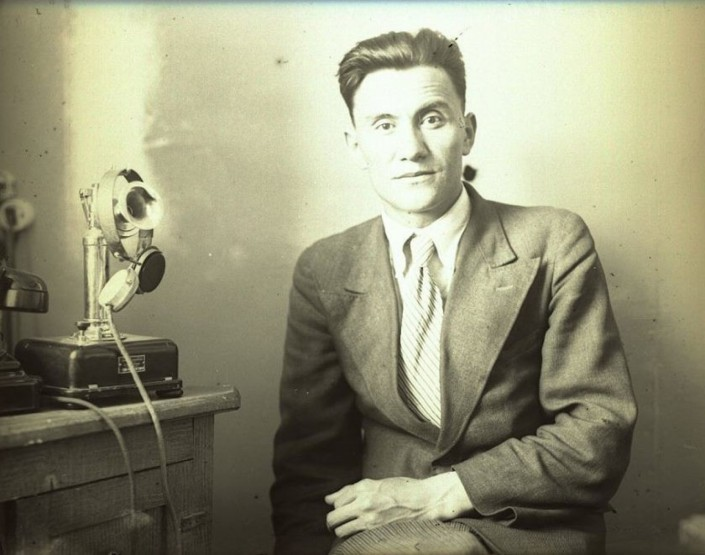
Kunayev as the deputy chairman of the Council of People's Commissars of the Kazakh SSR (1940s)

After finishing the Almaty No.14th secondary school in 1930, he studied in the Institute of Non-Ferrous and Fine Metallurgy in Moscow in 1936, which enabled him to become a machine operator. By 1939 he had become engineer-in-chief of the Pribalkhashatroi mine, and joined the Communist Party of the Soviet Union (CPSU), a condition of the position.

Kunayev was deputy chairman of the Council of People's Commissars of the Kazakh SSR from April 1942 to 1946. In this post, during the years of World War II, he conducted significant work on the deployment and commissioning of enterprises and factories evacuated to Kazakhstan from the front-line areas of the USSR, as well as mobilising and training the republic's human reserves and soldiers for the Red Army. From 1946 to 1952, he was deputy chairman of the Council of Ministers of the Kazakh SSR. In 1952, he was elected President of the Academy of Sciences of the Kazakh SSR, which under his leadership conducted scientific research with the aim of developing and improving industry and agriculture, and the more efficient use of Kazakhstan's natural resources. He served in this post until 1955, when he became Chairman of the Council of Ministers of the Kazakh SSR.

Kunayev's rise in Communist Party ranks had been closely tied to that of Leonid Brezhnev's. In February 1954, Khrushchev appointed Panteleymon Ponomarenko as the first secretary of the Communist Party of Kazakhstan, and Leonid Brezhnev as the second secretary. Soon, Kunayev and Brezhnev developed a close friendship which lasted until the death of Brezhnev.

Brezhnev soon became the first secretary of the Communist Party of Kazakhstan in 1955 and a member of CPSU Politburo in 1956. When Brezhnev left Kazakhstan in 1956, Ivan Iakovlev became the First Secretary of the Kazakh Communist Party (and was succeeded by Nikolai Belyaev). On 19 January 1960, Kunayev was elected 1st Secretary of the Communist Party of Kazakhstan. He was the first Kazakh to hold the post.

=== First stint in charge: 1960-1962 ===
One of Kunayev's first actions as leader of the Kazakh SSR was a visit to the United States in January 1960, as part of a delegation led by Chairman of the Council of Ministers of the RSFSR, Dmitry Polyansky. Over the course of a month, the delegation visited 23 American cities in 10 states, including New York and Washington. During the trip, Kunayev met with the leadership of the United Nations, including the Secretary-General, Dag Hammarskjöld as well as with senior American statesmen including US Secretary of State Christian Herter, Chief Justice of the US Supreme Court Earl Warren, and several state governors. At the end of the visit, the Soviet delegation including Kunayev were received at the White House by the US president, Dwight D. Eisenhower.

In March 1960, the leader of the USSR, Nikita Khrushchev visited the Kazakh SSR, and together with Kunayev, they toured the republic for 13 days. Based on the decisions and conversations between Kunayev and Khrushchev during the latter's stay in Kazakhstan, large-scale work was launched to develop the republic:

- The Sokolovsko-Sarybaisky plant was put into operation.
- The first blast furnace was launched at the Karaganda Metallurgical Plant.
- The first unit of the Bukhtarma State District Power Plant was put into operation.
- The first coke battery at Karmet was put into operation and the first Kazakh coke was produced.
- The construction of a highway connecting three capitals of the union republics, namely the Alma-Ata-Frunze-Tashkent highway, was completed.
- Hundreds of other major facilities and projects throughout Kazakhstan changed the face of the country.

As First Secretary, Kunayev was an ardent supporter of the Virgin Lands campaign, which opened millions of hectares of lands in central Kazakhstan to agricultural development and caused a large influx of Russian immigrants into Kazakhstan. However, in 1962 he was dismissed from his position as he disagreed with Khrushchev's plans to transfer some lands in Southern Kazakhstan to Uzbekistan. Ismail Yusupov, a supporter of the plan, replaced Kunayev. Another source of disagreements between Kunayev and Khrushchev had been the creation of a new administrative entity, the "Virgin Lands Territory", which incorporated the Kazakh regions of Kokchetav, Pavlodar, Kustanai, North Kazakhstan and Tselinograd into a new region with dual subordination to Alma-Ata and Moscow.

== First Secretary of the Communist Party of Kazakhstan ==
After his dismissal as First Secretary, he was Chairman of the Council of Ministers of the Kazakh SSR until 1964, when he became first secretary of the Central Committee of the Communist Party of Kazakhstan again in 1964 when Khrushchev was ousted and replaced by Brezhnev. He kept his position for twenty-two more years. Kunayev was appointed as an alternate member of the Politburo in 1967, and became a full member in 1971.

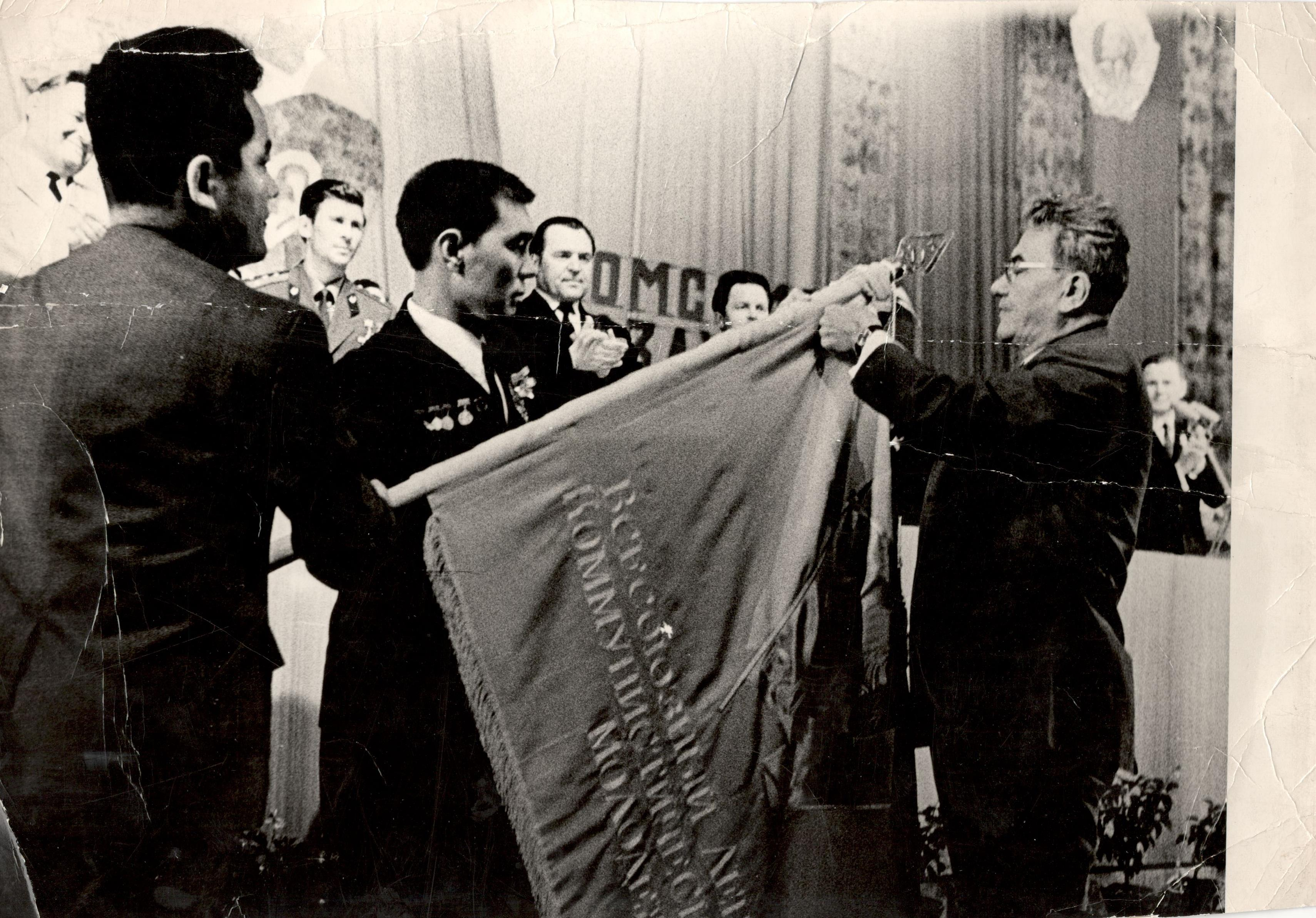
Kunayev awarding a Soviet Army unit's battle flag, 1986.

=== Economic development ===
Kunayev's return to the position of First Secretary of the Kazakh SSR coincided with the start of major economic reforms in the USSR, known as the Kosygin reforms. That year, over 450 thousand people throughout Kazakhstan received apartments, and the average salary increased by 28% compared to 1958.

Under Kunayev, Kazakhstan became one of the three largest economies of the USSR, along with Russia and Ukraine, the traditional industrial centers of the country since Tsarist times. As Russian political scientist Andrei Grozin notes, “Conventionally speaking, before Kunayev, Kazakhstan in economic terms was a desert.” Some of the major economic successes of Kunayev's Kazakhstan include:

- From the material of the Information and Analytical Center of Moscow State University: " According to statistics, during the years of D.A. Kunayev's activity, the republic's productive potential grew by more than 700%. The volume of industry grew 9 times, agriculture - 6 times, capital construction - 8 times.
- About 1,000 enterprises and workshops were commissioned throughout the republic; such a volume of construction work throughout the country has not been seen either before or after in Kazakhstan.
- Of the currently operating largest oil refineries in Kazakhstan, two were built under Kunayev: in the cities of Pavlodar (1978) and Chimkent (1985).
- Coal production grew from 28 million to 132 million tons between 1955 and 1986.
- The production of electricity increased by 6 times between 1955 and 1986 (from 14.5 million to 85 million kilowatt-hours).
- During the period 1954–1984, 600 million tons of grain were produced in Kazakhstan, with the average annual sale of grain increasing ninefold.

Furthermore, many significant objects were built in Kazakhstan, including the Medeu sports complex, the National Library building, the House of Political Education, new buildings of KazGU (unofficially called KazGUgrad), the Central Republican Museum, the Kaztelecenter building, the Koktobe TV tower, the House of Friendship, the Glory Monument in the Park of 28 Panfilov Guardsmen, the Kazakhstan, Otyrar, Alma-Ata, Alatau hotels, the Alatau and Kazakhstan sanatoriums, the Samal, Aksai, Almagul, Ainabulak microdistricts and many other cultural and residential facilities.

=== Culture and science ===
Throughout his time in office, Dinmukhamed Kunayev, paid special attention to important Kazakh cultural figures. He personally initiated many of them to nominate prestigious All-Union prizes and awards. Among them: Gabit Musrepov, Serke Kozhamkulov, Ilyas Yesenberlin, Bibigul Tulegenova, Olzhas Suleimenov, Nurgisa Tlendiev, Roza Rymbaeva and many others. He believed that their successes glorified the Kazakh culture and nation far beyond the borders of the republic.

In addition to this, Kunayev defended and supported cultural figures whose works fell under the censorship machine of the USSR. Thus, it was largely thanks to Kunayev that the works of Olzhas Suleimenov's "AZiYA" and Ilyas Yesenberlin's "Nomads" were published. In those years, books were published in Alma-Ata that were often refused to be published in Moscow and other parts of the USSR, for example, the works of Nikolai Raevsky "If Portraits Speak", "Portraits Have Spoken", Yuri Dombrovsky's book "Torch" and others. To a large extent, this was possible because Kunayev himself was not a supporter of bans on self-expression of writers and theatergoers.

As an Academian and former President of the Kazakh Academy of Science, Kunayev often relied on the position of the scientific community in solving state-important problems. By 1985, the Kazakh Academy of Sciences had become a major scientific center of the USSR, employing over 40 thousand personnel, among them 864 doctors of science, 650 academicians, corresponding members of the Academy of Sciences and professors. During the time of Yuri Andropov as General Secretary, at the personal request of Kunayev, foreign currency funds were allocated for the purchase of modern equipment from Western countries intended for industrial enterprises and scientific institutions of the Kazakh SSR.

Soviet Kazakhstan was recognised in the world of science due to frequent major international events in Kazakhstan with the participation of leading scientists from both the USSR and abroad. Among such events, one can especially note the international conference of the World Health Organization, which was held in Alma-Ata in 1978. It became historical in the world health system, since it adopted a declaration called the "Great Charter of World Health" by the UN.

=== Strengthening sovereignty ===
One of the main measures of Kunayev as First Secretary was the issue of strengthening the territorial integrity of the republic. Thus, less than a month after he took office, on December 1, 1964, the West Kazakhstan Territory and South Kazakhstan Territory were abolished. A year later, in 1965, the Virgin Lands Territory which Khrushchev had created several years earlier was abolished. The leadership of the republic understood that the Virgin Lands created under Khrushchev was another territory that they intended to separate from Kazakhstan.

Under Kunayev's initiative, on November 23, 1970, the Turgai region was formed as part of the Kazakh SSR from parts of the Kustanai and Tselinograd regions, and on March 20, 1973, the Jezkazgan region was formed from parts of the Karaganda region. These decisions allowed the creation of administrative units in the north of the country that were predominantly populated by ethnic Kazakhs. These measures reduced the ambiguous political talk behind the scenes about the northern regions being predominantly non-Kazakh and hence reduced the chance that they would be separated from Kazakhstan.

Kunayev did something that no other Soviet leader of Kazakhstan had done before him. He returned a number of areas in the south of the republic that had previously been transferred to the Uzbek SSR during the tenure of his predecessors under Khrushchev. Since the formation of the Kazakh SSR in 1936, for the first time the territory of the republic did not decrease, but increased.

=== Foreign policy ===
Kunayev was often trusted to lead government and parliamentary delegations of the USSR on official trips abroad, and to conduct negotiations with leaders of other states on behalf of the entire country. Kunayev led delegations to Algeria (1966), Iran (1968), the United Arab Republic (1970), North Korea (1978), Japan (1984), and was a member of delegations to Uruguay, Italy, India, Great Britain and other countries.

Speaking about his foreign trips to various countries as a leader and member of high Soviet government and parliamentary delegations, D.A. Kunayev emphasizes in his book “From Stalin to Gorbachev”: “ Wherever I was, in whatever countries I was, I always tried to tell in as much detail as possible about my republic, what Kazakhstan is “rich and famous for”, about the traditions, customs of the Kazakh people, about its culture and science.

=== Fall from power ===
During his leadership of the Kazakh SSR, Kunayev strongly promoted local talent. He notably recommended Nursultan Nazarbayev, the future first president of Kazakhstan, for the role of head of government. During an informal meeting with members of the Central Committee, he remarked:

None of you will be the next leader of this republic. Don’t take it personally! Only Nursultan Nazarbayev has a fair chance of succeeding me. He is young and talented.

During Kunayev's long rule, Kazakhs occupied prominent positions in the bureaucracy, economy and educational institutions. However, by 1986, a political struggle began between supporters of Kunayev, and supporters of Nursultan Nazarbayev, the Chairman of the Kazakh Council of Ministers (and Kunayev's former protegee). This culminated at the 16th Congress of the Communist Party of Kazakhstan in February 1986, when Kunayev came under criticism from several high-ranking members of the Kazakh Communist Party, most notable by Nazarbayev.

Nazarbayev criticized the construction in Almaty of a number of objects of great importance for the city, calling the historical museum and other social and household objects unnecessary for the city, an unnecessary waste of large funds. Nazarbayev also attacked the leadership of the Kazakh Academy of Sciences, led by Askar Kunayev, Dinmukhamed's brother. This was despite the fact that under Askar Kunayev, the academy became one of the leading scientific centers in the USSR, which was reflected by the Central Committee report which gave a positive assessment of the academy's activities. Nevertheless, Askar became subject to biased and unobjective criticism from the Soviet newspaper, Pravda, and was dismissed as President of the academy shortly after the party congress, to be replaced by Murat Aitkhozhin. It must also be noted that Kunayev himself was subject to criticism from Erkin Auelbekov, First Secretary of the Kyzylorda Regional Committee and Kamalidenov, the Ideology Secretary, who criticized the heads of universities for the high percentage of students of Kazakh ethnicity. This speech had an unequivocal negative effect on the public in Kazakhstan.

Dinmukhamed Kunayev, Nazarbayev's boss and Askar's brother, felt deeply angered and betrayed at the criticism at the Congress. Kunayev went to Moscow and demanded Nazarbayev's dismissal while Nazarbayev's supporters campaigned for Kunayev's dismissal and Nazarbayev's promotion. However, this did not go well for Kunayev, who saw Nazarbaev keep his position as Chairman of the Council of Ministers. Soon Kunayev himself was dismissed, as he was removed from office under pressure from Mikhail Gorbachev, who accused him of corruption. On 16 December 1986 the Politburo replaced him with Gennady Kolbin, the First Secretary of the Ulyanovsk Regional Committee.

==== Jeltoqsan ====
The decision to replace Kunayev, an ethnic Kazakh with Kolbin, an ethnic Russian who had never lived in the Kazakh SSR before set off three days of street rioting in Almaty, between 16 and 18 December 1986 – which were the first signs of ethnic strife during Gorbachev's tenure. In modern Kazakhstan, this revolt is called Jeltoqsan (meaning December in Kazakh).

The protests were violently suppressed by the KGB, who detained 8.5 thousand people. More than 1,700 people were injured, and about 5.5 thousand people were interrogated. In addition, hundreds were convicted, received penalties, fired from work, expelled from school, and subjected to administrative fines. Almost immediately after the December events D.A. Kunayev began to be accused of "nationalism" and was named among the organisers of the so-called riots by Kolbin, who stated that the reason for the "forceful solution to the issue" was allegedly Kunayev's refusal to speak to the youth. However, this is untrue, as Kunayev volunteered to speak to the protestors, but was not allowed to by Second Secretary of the Kazakh Communist Party, Oleg Miroshkin. This version of events is backed up by the recollections of Anatoly Goryainy (chief of personal security, colonel of the KGB).

In January 1987, Kunayev was removed from the Politburo of the Central Committee of the CPSU, and in June 1987 from the Central Committee of the CPSU. The well-known lawyer, academician Salyk Zimanov later stated that: "The reprisals against the "Kunayevites" began, including anyone who treated Kunayev D.A. with respect or spoke positively about him... Among them were Kunayev's assistant D.A. Bekezhanov, the manager of the affairs of the Central Committee of the party A.G. Statenin, and the head of the special forces escort of the first secretary of the Communist Party of the Republic M.I. Akuev. All of them were arrested and convicted. They were even credited with allegedly being among the initiators of the December events."

== Later life ==
=== Isolation and smear campaign ===
Kunayev was placed practically under house arrest. On Kolbin's personal instructions, Kunayev's contact with the outside world was minimized. Surveillance was established: where he goes, who comes to see him. Some of Kunayev's neighbors periodically reported to Kolbin about Kunayev's life, which is indirectly and directly confirmed by notes stored in the archives. There was a period when neighbors and old acquaintances avoided communicating with Kunayev. Among those who did not completely cut off ties with Dimash Akhmedovich in the period 1986-1989 were close relatives, as well as poet Olzhas Suleimenov, journalist Gennady Tolmachev, personal doctor Akhat Mulyukov, A. Goryainov, A. Shabdarbayev and others.

Despite Gorbachev's policies of glasnost, perestroika and democratization, neither foreign nor domestic journalists were allowed to approach Kunayev. Even if Kazakh journalists interviewed D.A. Kunayev, their materials were published only in a negative light. Thus, journalist Nina Savitskaya recalled that her material about D.A. Kunayev with his interview was not allowed, saying that if they did publish it, only on the condition that Kunayev would have to be "diluted with dirt". She refused to publish her material under such conditions, doing so a year later, when the disgrace against Kunayev was lifted. Gennady Kolbin, with permission from the center in Moscow, also made sure that Kunayev was deprived of his dacha and the pension due to him.

On the collapse of the Soviet Union and the new state status of Kazakhstan, Kunayev wrote:

"Who argues: totalitarianism in all its forms and variants has truly outlived itself. Every phenomenon and process, including social ones, has its beginning and its end. Apparently, what had to happen happened. But, of course, not in such "primitive" forms, which catastrophically hit the working man first of all. But - I repeat with confidence - not all is lost. On the contrary! And especially for our native Republic of Kazakhstan. For the first time in many years, it has finally gained real independence and has become an equal state among the entire world community. Now it is vitally important for Kazakhstan, without compromising its sovereignty, to eradicate the vices of the totalitarian system, to develop and strengthen business ties with all countries in every possible way...".

=== Rehabilitation ===
On January 12, 1992, Dinmukhamed Kunayev turned 80 years old, receiving hundreds of letters and telegrams from all over Kazakhstan, including from academic scientists, cultural figures, famous athletes, military generals, major manufacturers, businessmen and significant representatives of other spheres. Kunayev was visited by many famous public figures, including the first Kazakh cosmonaut Toktar Aubakirov, the founder of the Kazakh and Turkish schools of taekwondo Mustafa Ozturk, theologian and translator of the Koran into Kazakh Khalifa Altay, People's Artist of the USSR Bibigul Tulegenova, Bakytzhan Momyshuly (son of the legendary Bauyrzhan Momyshuly) and many, many others. Thus, the rehabilitation of Kunayev was complete, and he celebrated his 80th birthday as a person whose name was once again respected among Kazakhs all over the world.

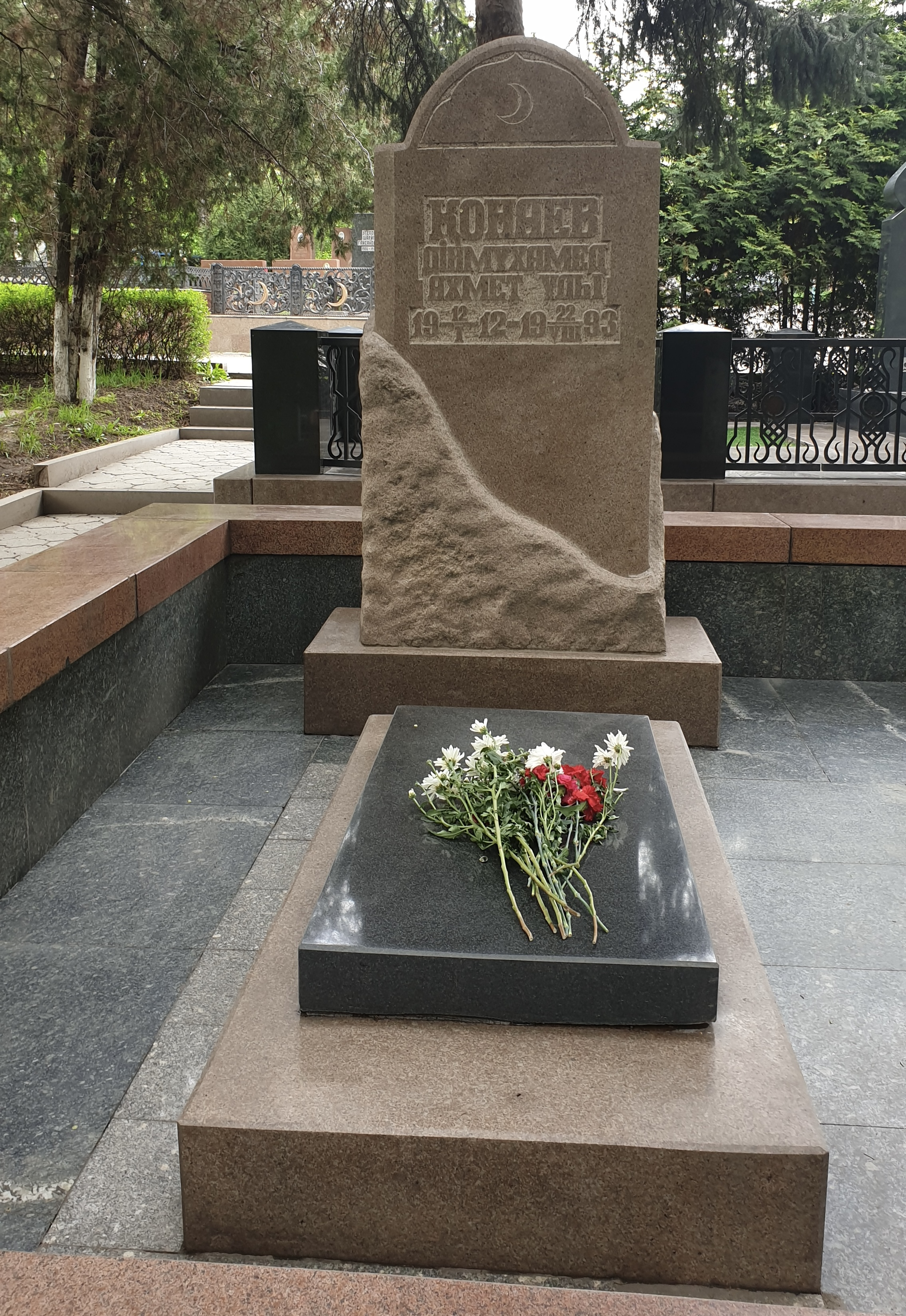
Grave of Dinmuhammed Konai. Almaty, Kensai Cemetery.

He died in the evening of 22 August 1993 in the village of Akshi, Alakol district of Almaty region as a result of a heart attack. He was buried on 25 August 1993 at the Kensai cemetery in the city of Alma-Ata.

== Positions of power ==
=== Leadership positions ===
- Deputy chairman of the Council of People's Commissars of the Kazakh SSR (1942–46)
- Deputy chairman of the Council of Ministers of the Kazakh SSR (1946–52)
- President of the Academy of Sciences of the Kazakh SSR (1952–55)
- Chairman of the Council of Ministers of the Kazakh SSR (1955–60, 1962–64)
- 1st Secretary of the Communist Party of Kazakhstan (1960–62, 1964–86)

=== Political positions ===
- Deputy of the Supreme Soviet of the Kazakh SSR of the 2nd–11th conventions (1947–89)
- Delegate to the XIX-XXVII Congresses of the CPSU (1952–1986)
- Deputy of the Supreme Soviet of the USSR of the 4th–11th conventions (1954–89)
- Member of the Central Committee of the CPSU (1956–87)
- Candidate-Member of the 23rd Politburo of the Central Committee of the CPSU (1966–71)
- Full Member of the 24th–27th Politburo of the Central Committee of the CPSU (1971–87)

== Achievements ==
Under D. A. Kunayev, a significant economic upswing in Kazakh SSR was achieved, the industrial potential of the republic increased significantly (mainly due to the mining, raw materials industries and the energy sector serving them) and agriculture (the annual famous “billion pounds” of grain was produced many times). In his book "From Stalin to Gorbachev" (1994), Kunayev himself referred to the data of the USSR State Statistics Committee, and he describes in detail his contribution to the development of living standards and the rise of the economy of the Kazakh SSR. By the end of Kunayev's time in power, compared with 1955, the economic potential of the Kazakh SSR increased by seven times, the standard of living, industry, production rose to a historic maximum, and the Kazakh SSR became the third largest economy in the Soviet Union (after the Russian SFSR and Ukrainian SSR). For great services to the development of the economy and the standard of living in the country, he was very popular among the Kazakh people and many still call the Kunayev era as the "Golden Age of Kazakhstan" to this day.

== Awards ==
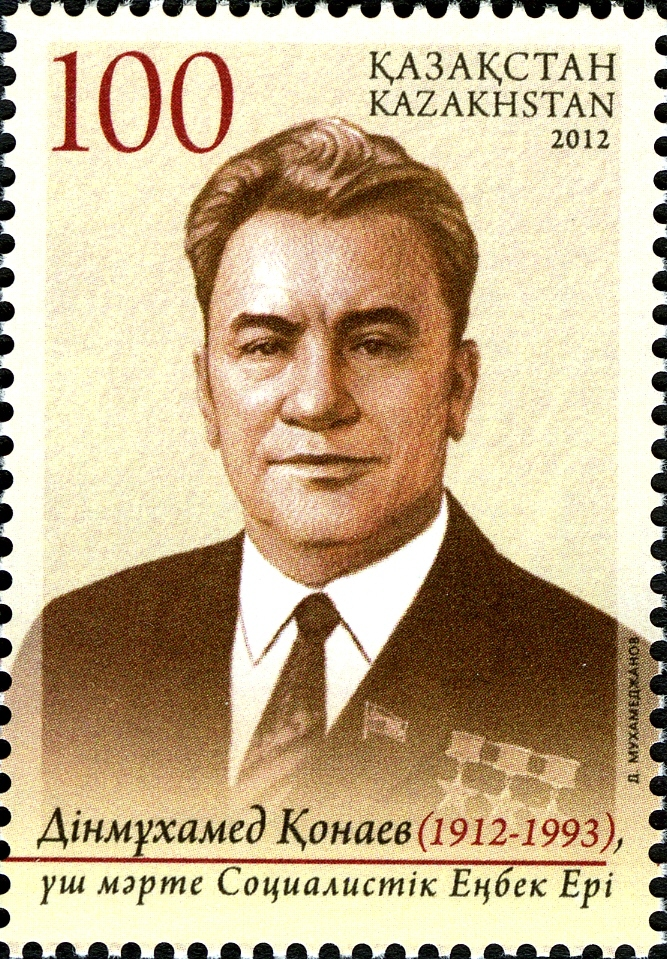
2012 Kazakh stamp commemorating Kunayev

=== Soviet ===
Thrice Hero of Socialist Labour (1972, 1976, 1982)
8 times Order of Lenin (1957, 1962, 1971, 1972, 1973, 1976, 1979, 1982)
Order of the October Revolution (1967)
Order of the Patriotic War of the 1st degree (1985)
Order of the Red Banner of Labour (1945)
Medal "For Labour Valour" (1959)
Medal "For Distinguished Labour" (1939)
Medal "For Valiant Labour in the Great Patriotic War 1941–1945" (1945)
Jubilee Medal "Twenty Years of Victory in the Great Patriotic War 1941-1945" (1965)
Jubilee Medal "Thirty Years of Victory in the Great Patriotic War 1941–1945" (1975)
Jubilee Medal "Forty Years of Victory in the Great Patriotic War 1941–1945" (1985)
Jubilee Medal "In Commemoration of the 100th Anniversary of the Birth of Vladimir Ilyich Lenin" (1969)
Medal "Veteran of Labour" (1974)
Medal "For Strengthening of Brotherhood in Arms"
Medal "For Distinction in Guarding the State Border of the USSR"
Medal "For the Development of Virgin Lands" (1956)
Jubilee Medal "50 Years of the Armed Forces of the USSR" (1967)
Jubilee Medal "60 Years of the Armed Forces of the USSR" (1978)
Medal "In Commemoration of the 250th Anniversary of Leningrad" (1957)
Medal "In Commemoration of the 1500th Anniversary of Kiev" (1982)

=== Foreign ===
Order of Georgi Dimitrov (1982, Bulgaria)
Order of February Victory, 1st class (1982, Czechoslovakia)
Order of Sukhbaatar (1974, Mongolia)

== Legacy ==
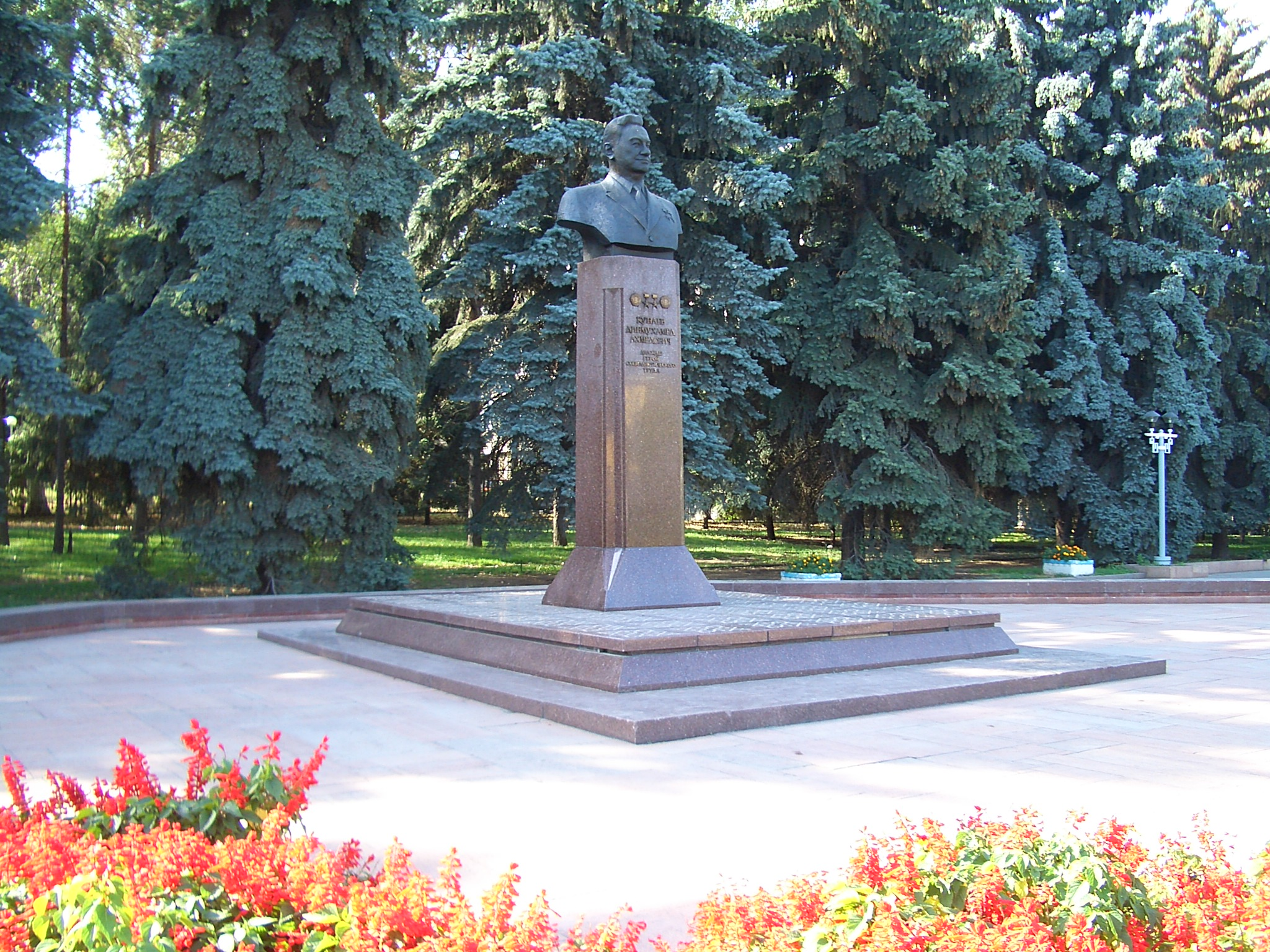
Kunayev Monument in Almaty

Kunayev spent the last years of his life in charitable activity, establishing the 'Dinmukhamed Kunayev Foundation', one of whose purposes was the support of political reform in Kazakhstan.

- In Almaty, a bust is installed in the square of his name. Also, his bust is in Taraz and in the village of Tortkol.
- Streets in a number of cities in Kazakhstan – in Almaty (Kunayev street), Taraz, Taldykorgan, Ekibastuz and the central street in the new administrative center of Astana.
- In Uralsk, a microdistrict is named after Kunayev.
- In Shymkent, a boulevard (former Alma-Ata Avenue and former Stepnaya Street) is named after D. A. Kunayev.
- The main street and the square of the city of Usharal is named after D. A. Kunayev. Also in the central square is a monument to D. A. Kunayev.
- The Eurasian Law Academy in Almaty is named after Kunayev.
- The Kunaev Home Museum (117 Tulebaev St.), opened in 2002 to the 90th anniversary of D. A. Kunayev.
- In Almaty, the Institute of Mining bears his name.
- As of March 2022, city Kapshagai is planned to be renamed after Kunayev.
- In May 2022, in the village of Bakanas, Almaty region of Kazakhstan, a monument to Kunayev was opened for the 110th anniversary.
- On May 20, 2022, a mural depicting statesman Dinmukhamed Kunayev appeared in Almaty. The author is Adilzhan Musa.
- On August 13, 2022, a monument to statesman Dinmukhamed Kunayev was unveiled in Taraz.
- In October 2022, a memorial was erected in Qonayev in honor of the 110th anniversary of Dinmukhamed Kunayev, the 100th anniversary of Asanbai Askarov, the 110th anniversary of Shapyk Shokin, who stood at the origins of the construction of the Kapshagay Hydroelectric Power Plant and the foundation of the city.
