= Zhumabay Shayakhmetov =

Soviet politician; First Secretary of the Communist Party of Kazakhstan (1902-1966)

- Жұмабай Шаяхметов

First Secretary of the Communist Party of the Kazakh SSR
- In office 22 July 1946 – 6 February 1954
- Preceded by: Gennady Borkov
- Succeeded by: Panteleimon Ponomarenko

Chairman of the Soviet of Nationalities
- In office 12 June 1950 – 20 April 1954
- Preceded by: Vasily Kuznetsov
- Succeeded by: Vilis Lācis

First Secretary of the South Kazakhstan Regional Committee of the Communist Party of Kazakhstan
- In office February 1954 – May 1955
- Preceded by: Nurdaulet Kuzembaev
- Succeeded by: Ismail Yusupov

Personal details
- Born: 30 August 1902 Akmolinsk Oblast, Governor-Generalship of the Steppes, Russian Empire (now Omsk, Russia)
- Died: 17 October 1966 (aged 64) Almaty, Kazakh SSR, Soviet Union
- Resting place: Central Cemetery
- Party: CPSU
- Spouse: Mainur Chokabaeva
- Children: 4

Jūmabai Şaiahmetūly Şaiahmetov (Note: Often transliterated as Zhumabay Shayakhmetuly Shayakhmetov through a Russified Romanization of Жумабай Шаяхметович Шаяхметов.) (Kazakh: Жұмабай Шаяхметұлы Шаяхметов; 30 August 1902 – 17 October 1966) was a Kazakh Soviet Communist political figure. From 1946 through 1954, he was First Secretary of the Communist Party of the Kazakh SSR.

He was born to a poor peasant family in a small village in Borisov County (okrug), which in 1924 was incorporated as one of the nine rural areas in the Sherbakulsky District of the Omsk Oblast. In 1915, he went to the two-year Kazakh-Russian school in what is now the Poltava Raion, graduating in 1917. He attended the Narimanov Institute in Moscow, but did not complete his first year. In 1919, he got a job as a school teacher in a rural school, but the school closed due to the civil war, and he returned to his home.

From 1919 to 1926, Shayakhmetov was the secretary of the Turkoman Rural District executive committee of the GPU. By 1923, he was already a first-rate agent, solving crimes in the Cherlaksky District, Omsk Oblast. From 1926 to 1928, Shayakhmetov taught office management (official documentation) as the political instructor in a rural organization called "Koschi" in the Petropavl Okrug. From 1928 to 1938, he worked for the NKVD, first as Deputy Department Chief for the North Kazakhstan Oblast, then as the Deputy Department Chief for the Alma Ata Oblast.

From 1938 to 1946, Shayakhmetov worked his way up from Third Secretary to First Secretary of the Central Committee of the Communist Party of the Kazakh SSR. He was the first ethnic Kazakh to hold that post. In March 1954, Shayakhmetov was replaced as First Secretary by Panteleimon Kondratyevich Ponomarenko, a Ukrainian, as part of Khrushchev's post-Stalin reorganization. From February 1954 to May 1955, he was the First Secretary of the South Kazakhstan provincial committee of the Communist Party of Kazakhstan, before he was removed from that post as well.

He served as Chairman of the Soviet of Nationalities (1950–1954).

Party political offices
Preceded by Vasili Kuznetsov	Chairman of the Soviet of Nationalities; June 12, 1950 – April 20, 1954	Succeeded by Vilis Lācis
