= Nikolay Skvortsov (politician) =

Soviet politician (1899-1974)

- Николай Скворцов
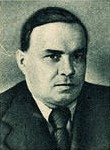
- Skvortsov in 1950

Ministry of State Farms of the USSR
- In office 4 February 1947 – 15 March 1953
- Preceded by: Position established
- Succeeded by: Alexey Kozlov (as Ministry of Agriculture and Procurement of the USSR)

Minister of Technical Cultures of the USSR
- In office 19 March 1946 – 4 February 1947
- Preceded by: Himself (as People's Commissar of Technical Cultures of the USSR)
- Succeeded by: Ivan Benediktov (as the Ministry of Agriculture of the USSR)

People's Commissar of Technical Cultures of the USSR
- In office 11 November 1945 – 13 July 1946
- Preceded by: Position established
- Succeeded by: Position abolished

2nd First Secretary of the Communist Party of the Kazakh SSR
- In office 23 May 1938 – 23 July 1945
- Preceded by: Levon Mirzoyan
- Succeeded by: Gennady Borkov

Personal details
- Born: 26 October 1899 Tsvetnoye, Astrakhan Governorate, Russian Empire
- Died: 15 January 1974 (aged 74) Moscow, Soviet Union
- Resting place: Novodevichy Cemetery
- Party: Communist Party of the Soviet Union (since 1919)
- Education: Moscow Planning Institute of the USSR State Planning Committee

Nikolay Aleksandrovich Skvortsov (Russian: Николай Александрович Скворцов; 26 October 1899 – 15 January 1974) was a Soviet politician and the First Secretary of the Communist Party of the Kazakh SSR from 3 May 1938 to 14 September 1945.

== Biography ==
Skvortsov was born in Tsvetnoye, Astrakhan Governorate during the Russian Empire.

From 1918 to 1919, he was the Red Army soldier, assistant head of the transit points of the military communication management of the Caspian-Caucasian Front. From 1919 to 1920, he was the Head of the financial subdepartment of the labor department of the Krasnoyarsk executive committee of the Astrakhan province. In 1920, he was the military commissioner of the 4th separate penal unit, Astrakhan province. From 1920 to 1921, he was the Deputy chairman of the Manych district commission for combating banditry and desertion. In 1921 to 1923, he was the Head of the agitation and propaganda department of the Manych district committee of the All-Union Communist Party (Bolsheviks), head of the district people's education department, deputy chairman of the Manych district executive committee.

From 1923 to 1924, he was the head of the district education department deputy chairman of the Remontnensky district executive committee. From 1924 to 1925, he was the Secretary of the Remontnensky district committee of the Russian Communist Party (Bolsheviks). From 1925 to 1928, he was the head of the Salsk district people's education department. From 1928 to 1930, he was the Deputy chairman of the Salsk district executive committee chairman of the district planning department. From 1930 to 1934, he was the student at the Moscow Planning Institute and later graduated.

From 1933 to 1938, he was the department of leadership party organs of the Central Committee of the All-Union Communist Party (Bolsheviks): instructor of the accounting department, head of the personnel accounting group, deputy head of the sector, head of the personnel accounting sector, head of the military personnel sector, and deputy head of the department. From 1938 to 1945, He was the Second (from May) and first secretary of the Central Committee of the Communist Party (Bolsheviks) of Kazakhstan. From 1945 to 1947, he was the People's Commissar, Minister of Technical Cultures of the USSR. From 1947 to 1953, he was the Minister of State Farms of the USSR. From 1953, he was the member of the board of the Ministry of Agriculture and Procurement of the USSR.

From 1953 to 1957, he was the deputy head of the Agricultural Department of the Ministry of Food Industry of the USSR. From 1957 to 1965, he was the deputy head of the Main Directorate for the Supply of Raw Materials for the Food Industry at the State Planning Committee of the USSR. In 1959, he completed the Higher Economic Courses at the State Planning Committee of the USSR. From 1965 to 1966, he was the acting head of the Main Directorate for the Supply of Raw Materials for the Food Industry of the Ministry of Food Industry of the USSR.

Since July 1966, he was a personal pensioner of union significance. He died on 15 January 1974, in Moscow, Soviet Union, and was buried at Novodevichy Cemetery.

== Awards ==
Order of Lenin, twice
Order of the Patriotic War, 1st class
Order of the Red Banner of Labour
Order of the Badge of Honour
