= Gennady Kolbin =

Soviet politician; First Secretary of the Communist Party of Kazakhstan (1927–1998)

- Геннадий Колбин
- Kolbin in the late 1980s

Chairman of the Party and State Control Committee
- In office 7 June 1989 – 26 December 1990
- Preceded by: Sergey Manyakin
- Succeeded by: Position abolished

First Secretary of the Communist Party of Kazakhstan
- In office 16 December 1986 – 22 June 1989
- Preceded by: Dinmukhamed Kunaev
- Succeeded by: Nursultan Nazarbayev

First Secretary of the Ulyanovsk Regional Committee of the CPSU
- In office 15 December 1983 – 12 January 1987
- Preceded by: Ivan Kuznetsov
- Succeeded by: Yuri Samsonov

Personal details
- Born: Gennady Vasilyevich Kolbin; 7 May 1927 Nizhny Tagil, Ural Oblast, RSFSR, Soviet Union
- Died: 15 January 1998 (aged 70) Moscow, Russia
- Party: Communist Party of the Soviet Union (1954–1991)
- Spouse: Sofya Kolbina
- Children: 2
- Education: Ural Polytechnic Institute
- Profession: Metallurgical engineer
- Awards: Order of Lenin (twice)

Gennady Vasilyevich Kolbin (Russian: Геннадий Васильевич Колбин; 7 May 1927 – 15 January 1998) was the First Secretary of the Central Committee of the Communist Party of the Kazakh SSR from 16 December 1986 to 22 June 1989.

== Early life ==
Kolbin was born in 1927 in Nizhny Tagil. From 1942 to 1943, he served as an apprentice of a model designer at a factory and a shoemaker in Nizhny Tagil. In 1943, he started studying at the Nizhny Tagil Mining and Metallurgical College. From 1947 to 1959, he served as designer-technologist, head of the technological bureau, deputy head, head and deputy chief engineer at the plant in Nizhny Tagil. Kolbin joined the Communist Party of the Soviet Union in 1954.

In 1955 he graduated from the Ural Polytechnic Institute named after S. M. Kirov in absentia and later studied in graduate school.

== Political career ==
In 1959, he served as secretary of the party committee at the plant. In 1962, he served as Second Secretary and First Secretary of the Lenin District Committee of the CPSU of Nizhny Tagil. From 1962 to 1970, he served as Second Secretary and First Secretary of the Nizhny Tagil City Committee of the CPSU.

From 1970 to 1975, Kolbin was appointed as Secretary and later as Second Secretary of the Sverdlovsk Regional Committee of the CPSU. Kolbin then served as the Second Secretary of the Central Committee of the Communist Party of Georgia. He served the Deputy of the Supreme Soviet of the Georgian SSR from 1975 to 1984. After leaving, in 1976, to Moscow, following promotion as the first secretary of the Sverdlovsk regional committee of the CPSU, Yakov P. Ryabov was considered as the main candidate for the post of first secretary of the Sverdlovsk regional committee of the CPSU. However, at the suggestion of Ryabov, acting secretary of the Sverdlovsk Regional Committee of the CPSU, Boris Yeltsin, was nominated for this post.

Kolbin was appointed as the First Secretary of the Ulyanovsk Regional Committee of the CPSU, from 1983 to 1986. On his initiative, the Microelectronics Center, a branch of Moscow State University, was opened in Ulyanovsk, and a decision was made to build the President Bridge across the Volga River. He served as the Deputy of the Supreme Soviet of the RSFSR from 1971 to 1975.

Kolbin served as the Deputy of the Supreme Soviet of the Soviet Union from 1979 to 1989. He also served as the Member of the Presidium of the Supreme Soviet from 1987 to 1989.

=== First Secretary of the Communist Party of Kazakhstan ===
In 1986, Kolbin was appointed as the First Secretary of the Central Committee of the Communist Party of Kazakhstan. He replaced Dinmukhamed Kunaev, who previously served as the First Secretary of the Communist Party of Kazakhstan, from 1964. Kolbin had not worked in the Kazakh SSR prior to his appointment. He was appointed by Mikhail Gorbachev in an attempt to root out corruption in the Communist Party of the Kazakh SSR. Kolbin served as the Deputy of the Supreme Soviet of the Kazakh SSR from 1987 to 1989 and member of the Presidium of the Supreme Soviet of the Kazakh SSR from 1987 to 1989.

As an outsider to Kazakhstan, he was not well received there. His appointment resulted in violent protests in the Kazakh capital Almaty and other cities, with several thousand protesters killed and hundreds injured. This revolt is now known as "Jeltoqsan", Kazakh for "December". It is reported that the outgoing first secretary, Dinmukhamed Kunaev, participated in organizing the protests, which involved 60,000 protesters. The report of Kunaev participation is likely fabricated, given that Kunaev was under home arrest at the time, isolated and was not allowed to communicate with anyone.

In June 1989, Kolbin was replaced by Kazakh Nursultan Nazarbayev. Kolbin was then transferred to a position in Moscow.

=== Further political positions ===
Following his transfer to Moscow, Kolbin served as the Chairman of the People's Control Commission from 1989 to 1990. He served as the People's Deputy of the USSR from 1989 to 1991. He retired from all political positions in December 1990.

== Later life ==
From December 1990 onwards, Kolbin was a personal pensioner of federal significance. From 1992 to 1998, he served as the chairman of the Board of Directors of OJSC Mosuralbank.

On 15 January 1998, while travelling onboard the Moscow Metro to visit his daughter, Kolbin suddenly felt unwell and collapsed in the metro, and died of a heart attack. He was buried at the Troyekurovskoye Cemetery in Moscow.

== Personal life ==
Kolbin was married to Sofya Ivanovna Kolbina (1926–1998). They had two daughters; Marina (born 1950) and Natalia (1952–1984).

== Honours and awards ==
| Order of Lenin, twice |
| Order of the October Revolution |
| Order of the Red Banner of Labour, twice |
| Order of the Badge of Honour |
