= Tsvetnoye =

Tsvetnoye Цветное
- Selo
- Location within Astrakhan Oblast Location within Russia
- Coordinates: 46°11′N 48°43′E
- Country: Russia
- Region: Astrakhan Oblast
- District: Volodarsky District
- Time zone: UTC+4:00

Tsvetnoye (Russian: Цветное) is a rural locality (a selo) and the administrative center of Tsvetnovsky Selsoviet of Volodarsky District, Astrakhan Oblast, Russia. The population was 1,121 as of 2010. There are 20 streets.

== Geography ==
Tsvetnoye is located 32 km (20 mi) south of Volodarsky (the district's administrative centre) by road. Zelyony Ostrov is the nearest rural locality.
