= Kuterem =

Kuterem Кутерем
- Selo
- Location within Bashkortostan Location within Russia
- Coordinates: 55°59′N 54°31′E
- Country: Russia
- Region: Bashkortostan
- District: Kaltasinsky District
- Time zone: UTC+5:00

Kuterem (Russian: Кутерем; Bashkir: Күтәрем, Kütärem) is a rural locality (a selo) in Kelteyevsky Selsoviet, Kaltasinsky District, Bashkortostan, Russia. The population was 1,081 as of 2010. There are 16 streets.

== Geography ==
Kuterem is located 20 km west of Kaltasy (the district's administrative centre) by road. Bolshoy Keltey is the nearest rural locality.
