= Rybinsky Uyezd =

Rybinsky Uyezd (Рыбинский уезд) was one of the subdivisions of the Yaroslavl Governorate of the Russian Empire. It was situated in the central part of the governorate. Its administrative centre was Rybinsk.

== Demographics ==
At the time of the Russian Empire Census of 1897, Rybinsky Uyezd had a population of 92,905. Of these, 98.7% spoke Russian, 0.4% Yiddish, 0.3% German, 0.3% Polish, 0.1% Ukrainian and 0.1% Tatar as their native language.
