= Kunaev Street (Almaty) =

Street in Almaty, Kazakhstan

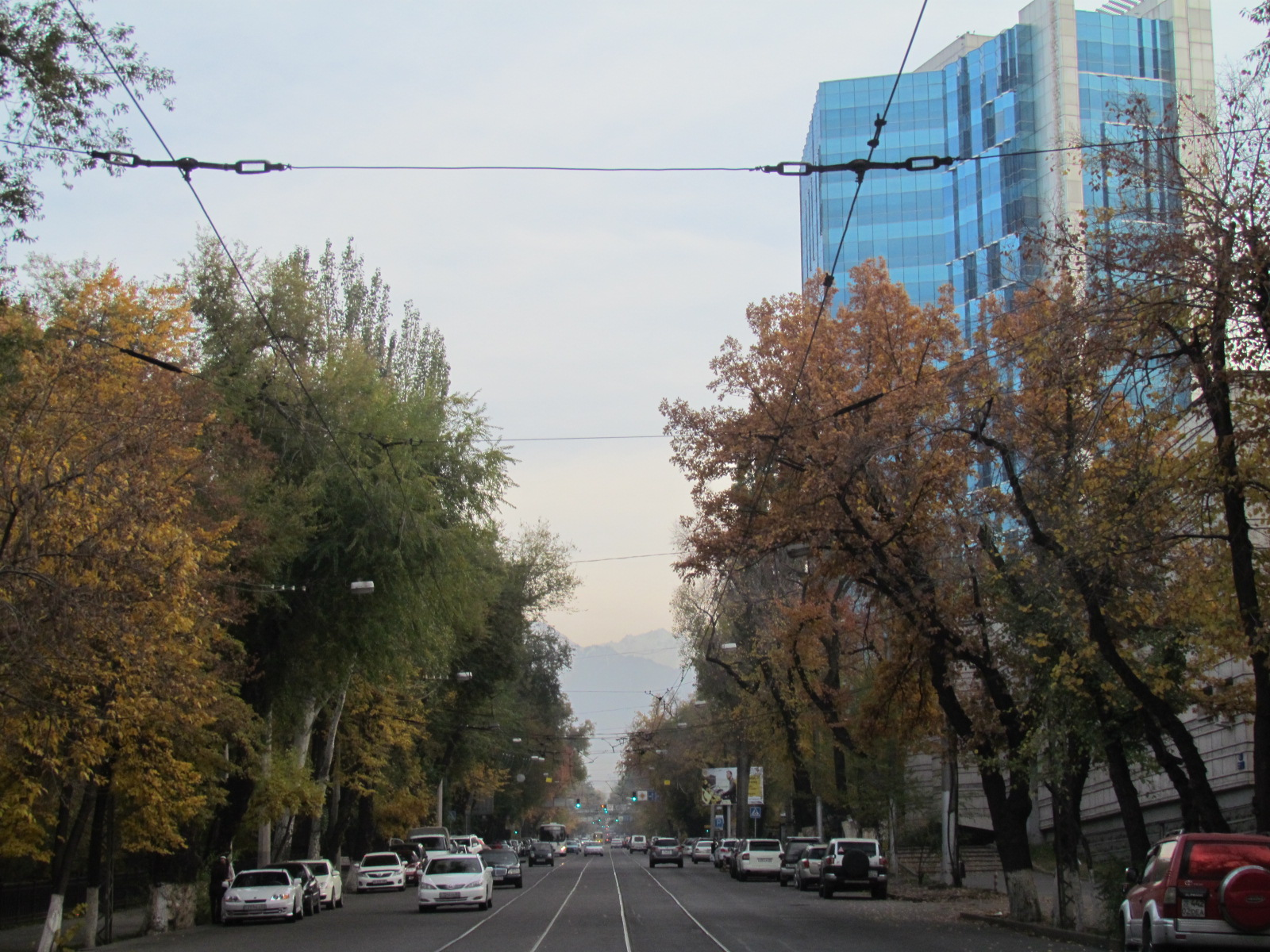
- View of the Kunaev Street seen from the crossroad of Kunaev and Gogol Street
- Native name: Қонаев көшесі (Kazakh); улица Кунаева (Russian)
- Former names: Kapalskaya (until 1919); Karl Marx (1919–1994)
- Length: 3050 m
- Area: Medeu District
- Location: Almaty, Kazakhstan

Kunaev Street (Kazakh: Қонаев көшесі; Russian: улица Кунаева) is one of the main streets in the city of Almaty that is named after Dinmukhamed Kunaev.

== Location ==
Kunaev Street is located in the Medeu District, between the streets of Valikhanov (Krasin) and Tulebaev. It starts from the Raimbek Avenue, then crosses the streets of Zhibek Zholy (Gorky), Gogol, Tole Bi, Bogenbai Batyr (Kirov), Kabanbai Batyr (Kalinin), Shevchenko, Kurmangazy and ends in Abay Avenue. The length of the street is 3050 m.

== History ==
Kunaev Street was developed in the late 19th century, it housed shops for traders, buyers, and craftsmen workshops. The street is known for its historical and revolutionary events, related to the names of the heroes of October Revolution and Russian Civil War; Dmitry Furmanov, Bagautdin Shegabutdinov, Rudolf Marechek, Tokash Bokin. The demonstrations held in Kunaev Street were soldier's wives who protested against the imperialist war, and the first May Day demonstration of the working people of the Soviet Faithful. During the Soviet Union, the street was reconstructed and landscaped, planted with deciduous trees such as oak, poplar, and elm. A square with a bust statue of Kunaev was created in 1978, concrete canal ditches were installed, where during the summer, the water rose up from the ditch.

== Name ==
Until 1919, the street was called Kapalskoy. In Soviet times, from June 1919, it was renamed in honor of the founder of communism Karl Marx. In the 1994, it was renamed in honor of the First Secretary of the Communist Party of Kazakh SSR Dinmukhamed Kunaev

== Notable buildings and structures ==
Residential and office buildings that were built during the Soviet times; "The Ministry of Social Welfare", "Research Institute of Organic Catalysis and Electrochemistry, Academy of Sciences of the Kazakh SSR", the Central Committee of the Red Cross, the republican House of health education, the regional teacher's House, a republican House of models, factory hats, the firm "Almagul" by mating and individual tailoring of knitted products, the company "Kazakhstan" on individual sewing and repairing clothes and hotel "Kazpotrebsoyuz".

On Kunaev Street are also located Kazakhstan Academy of Sciences, and a fire station Medeu district.

== Monuments ==
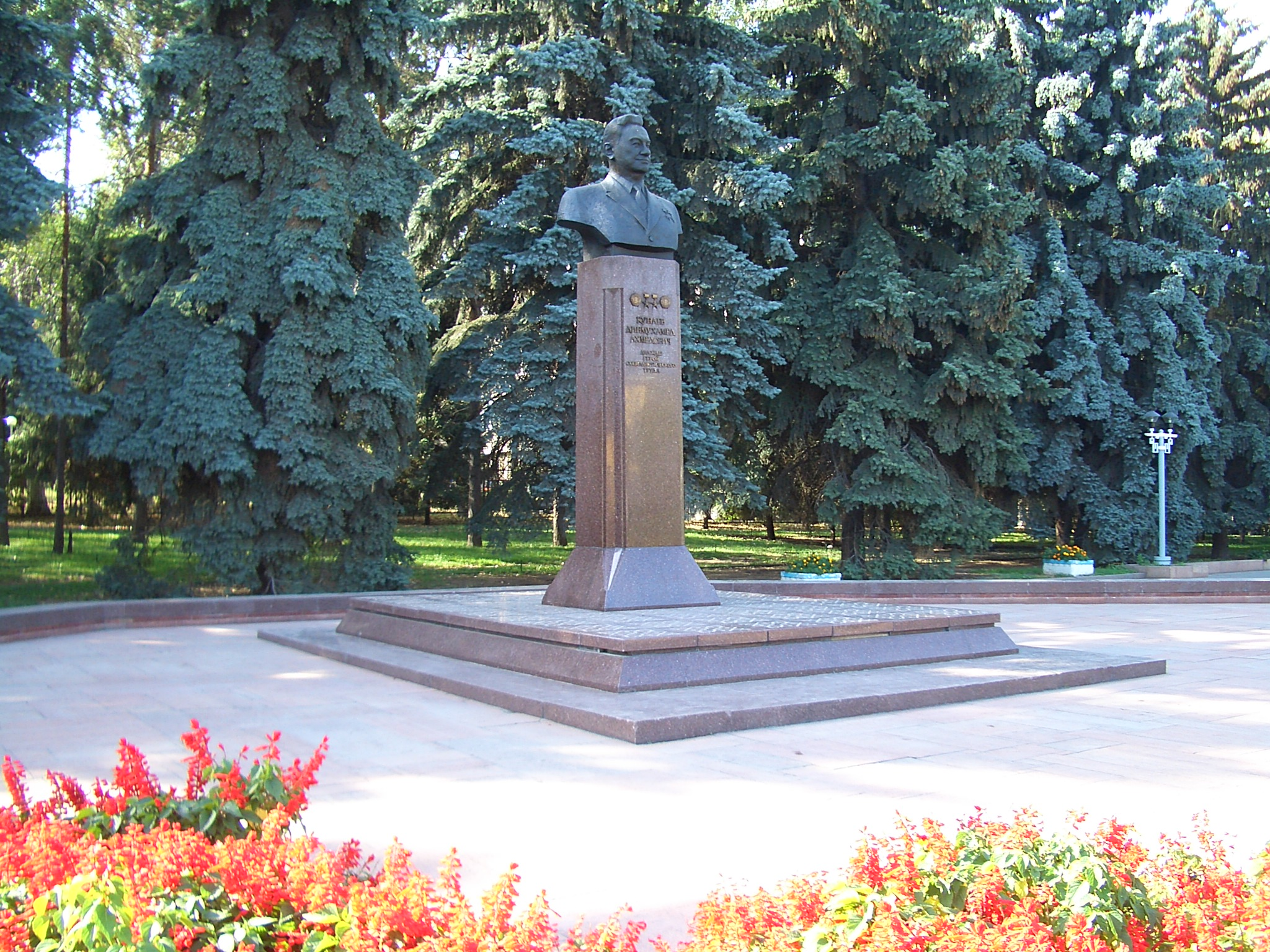
Kunaev Monument

== Transportation ==
In the street to 2015 (inclusive) and the tram route.

- 'The tram number 4' : It starts and ends at the Aksai station. Passes through the streets Momyshuly, Tole bi Baitursynov Shevchenko Kunaeva, Makatayev Jetysu, Arykova, Cherkasy defense Turgen (with access to the Zhetysu).

Tram now does not work.
