= Ashan, Nagorno-Karabakh =

Ashan Աշան
- Heşan
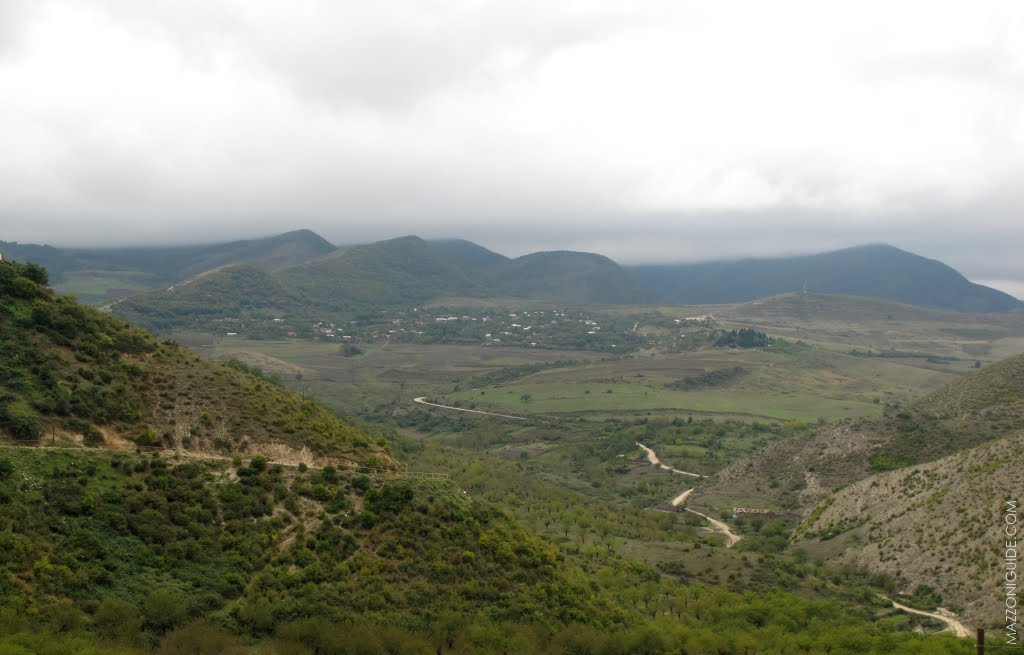

- Location within Azerbaijan Location within Karabakh Economic Region
- Coordinates: 39°50′47″N 46°59′49″E
- Country: Azerbaijan
  - District: Khojavend
- Elevation: 745 m (2,444 ft)

Population (2015)
  - Total: 544
- Time zone: UTC+4 (AZT)

Ashan (Armenian: Աշան) or Heshan (Azerbaijani: Heşan) is a village in the Khojavend District of Azerbaijan, in the disputed region of Nagorno-Karabakh. Until 2023 it was controlled by the breakaway Republic of Artsakh. The village had an ethnic Armenian-majority population until the expulsion of the Armenian population of Nagorno-Karabakh by Azerbaijan following the 2023 Azerbaijani offensive in Nagorno-Karabakh.

== History ==
During the Soviet period, the village was a part of the Martuni District of the Nagorno-Karabakh Autonomous Oblast.

== Historical heritage sites ==
Historical heritage sites in and around the village include a 7th-century chapel, a 17th/18th-century village and cemetery, and the 19th-century church of Surb Astvatsatsin (Armenian: Սուրբ Աստվածածին, lit. 'Holy Mother of God').

== Economy and culture ==
The population is mainly engaged in agriculture and animal husbandry. As of 2015, the village has a municipal building, a house of culture, a secondary school, a kindergarten, and a medical centre.

== Demographics ==
The village had 588 inhabitants in 2005, and 544 inhabitants in 2015.
