= Jeltoqsan =

1986 Alma-Ata protests and riots against an ethnic Russian leader

Jeltoqsan Kazakh: Желтоқсан көтерілісі
- Part of Revolutions of 1989 and the Dissolution of the Soviet Union
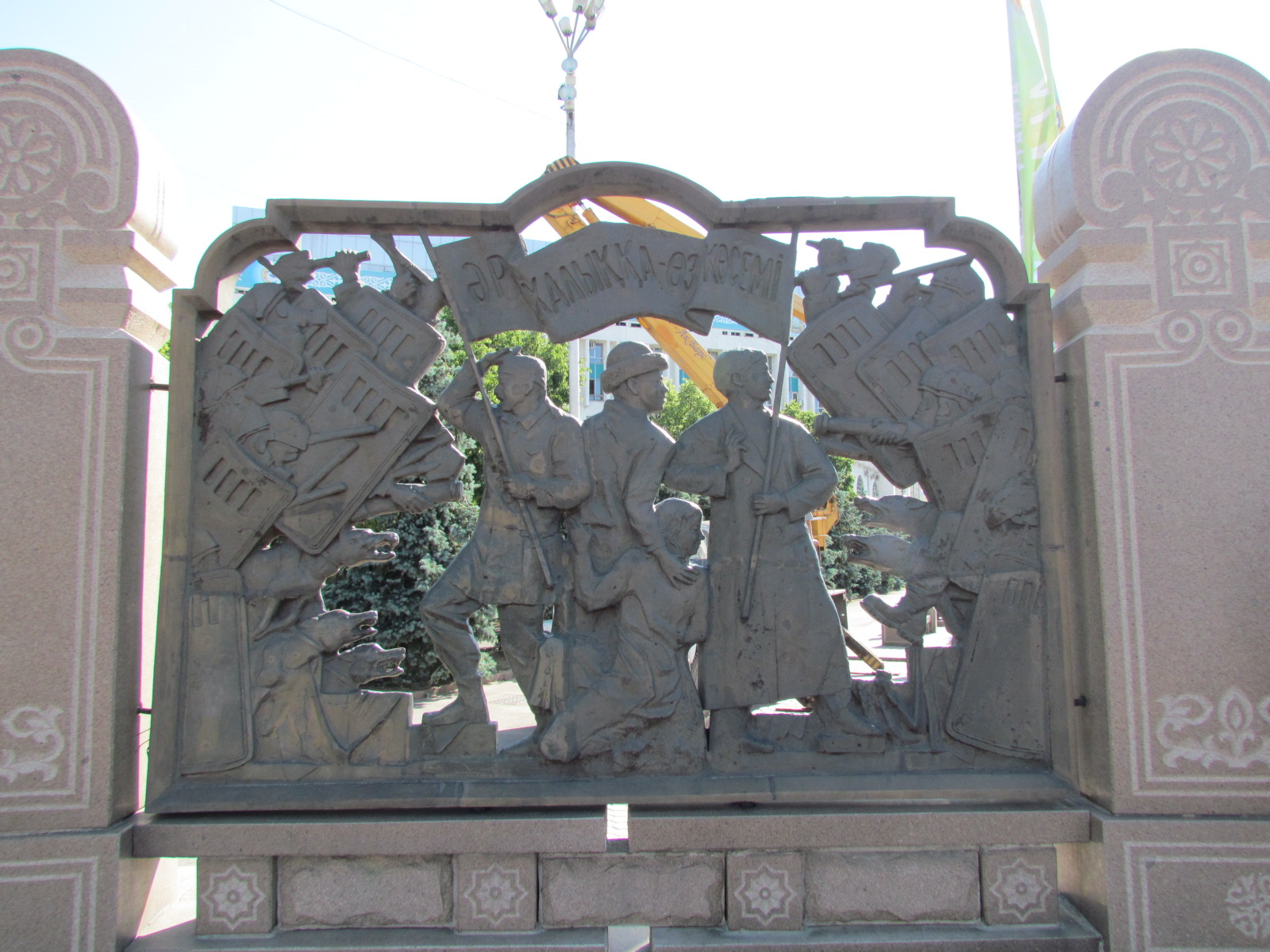
- Fragment of the monument to the Independence of Kazakhstan
Date	16–19 December 1986
Location	Alma-Ata, Kazakh SSR, Soviet Union
Result	Protests suppressed; massive casualties after clashes

Belligerents
Kazakh protesters	Soviet Union: OMON; KGB

Commanders and leaders
No organized leadership	(Soviet Union) Mikhail Gorbachev; Gennady Kolbin

Casualties and losses
- 200–1,000 civilians killed More than 200 injured

The Jeltoqsan (Kazakh: Желтоқсан көтерілісі, romanized: Jeltoqsan köterılısı, lit. 'December uprising'), also spelled Zheltoksan, or December of 1986, were protests that took place in Alma-Ata, Kazakh SSR, in response to CPSU General Secretary Mikhail Gorbachev's dismissal of Dinmukhamed Kunaev, the First Secretary of the Communist Party of Kazakhstan and an ethnic Kazakh, and his replacement with Gennady Kolbin, an ethnic Russian from the Russian SFSR.

The events lasted from 16 to 19 December 1986. The protests began in the morning of 17 December, as a student demonstration attracted thousands of participants as they marched through Brezhnev Square (present-day Republic Square) across to the CPK Central Committee building. As a result, internal troops and OMON forces entered the city, and violence erupted throughout the city. In the following days, protests spread to Shymkent, Taldykorgan, and Karaganda. This event was the start of the slow collapse of authoritarian communist rule in Central and Eastern Europe which would later begin in 1989.

== Protests ==
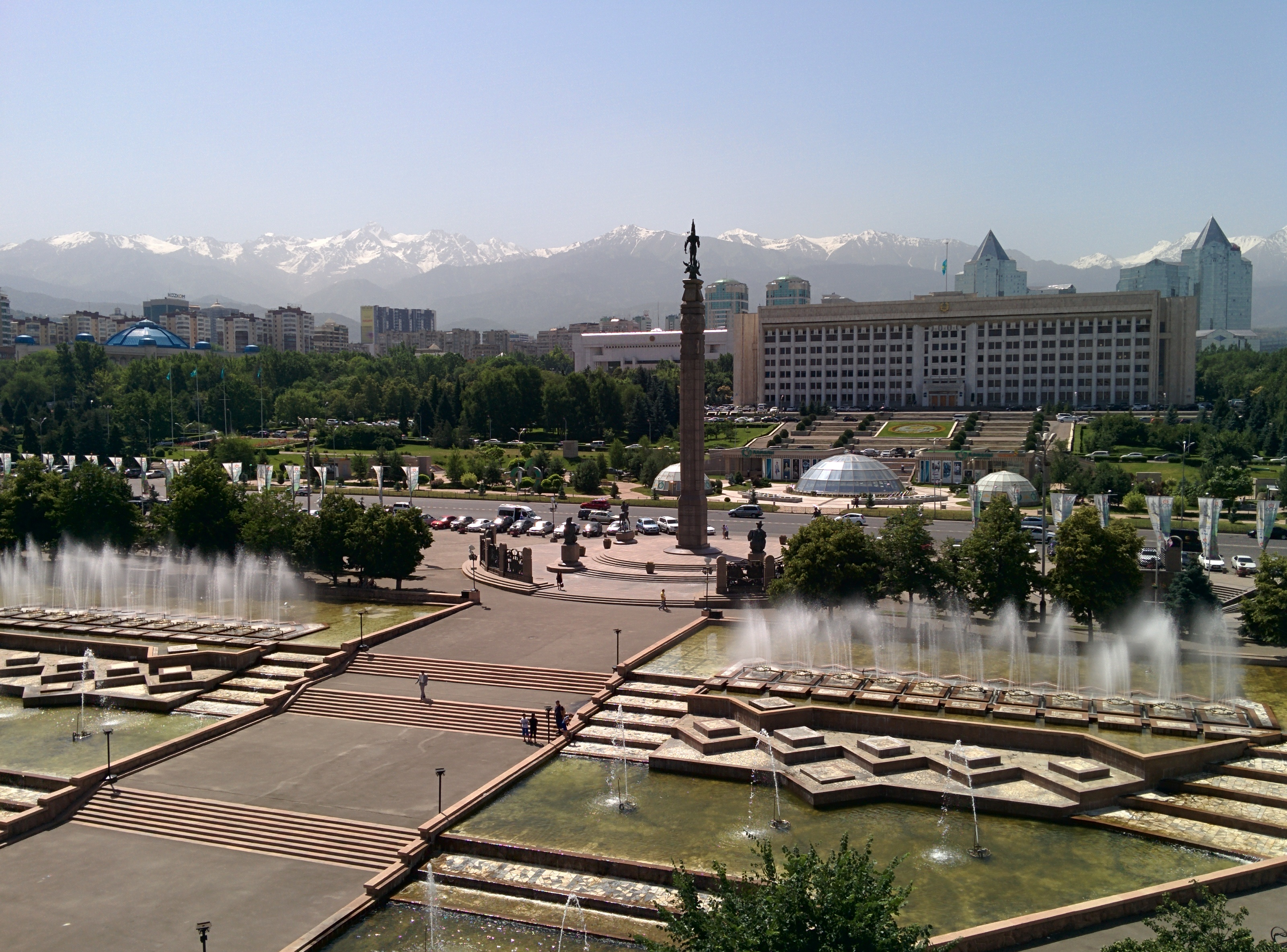
A location of Republic Square, formerly known as Brezhnev Square, where the protests broke out

The primary reason for the peaceful student demonstrations that started in the early morning of 17 December was the dismissal of the long-serving First Secretary of the Communist Party of Kazakhstan, Dinmukhamed Kunaev (1964–1986) on 16 December and the appointment of Gennady Kolbin (1986–1989) as the First Secretary. Kolbin was unpopular as he had not previously lived or worked in Kazakhstan.

According to Gorbachev's memoirs, after the 27th Congress of the Communist Party of the Soviet Union, he met with Kunaev and discussed Kunaev's resignation. Kunaev expressed his desire to retire and proposed the appointment of someone without previous links to the Kazakh Communist Party in his place to stop advancement of Nursultan Nazarbayev (later and also the first President of Kazakhstan) in the party ranks. Kunaev, in his own book, said that Gorbachev never asked him about his replacement and only said "a good comrade will be sent".

In Nursultan Nazarbayev’s memoirs, he recounts a pivotal moment when he left Kolbin’s office and headed to the square. This moment, he recalls, changed the course of his life. In the square, tensions escalated as neither side was prepared for dialogue. One side accused the protesters, while the other resorted to stones and chunks of ice. Although the protesters initiated the use of force, the police and special forces provoked them into aggressive actions to justify harsh repressive measures. By the evening of December 17, the situation had intensified. A flare gun was fired through the window of one of the Central Committee offices, causing a fire, which provided the authorities with grounds to launch a severe crackdown on the protests. Nazarbayev asserts that the provocations were orchestrated by security services, who supplied the protesters with weapons to incite violence.

Demonstrations started in the morning of 17 December 1986 as 200–300 students gathered in front of the Central Committee building on Brezhnev Square to protest the decision of the CPSU to appoint Kolbin rather than an ethnic Kazakh. The number of protesters increased to 1,000–5,000 as students from universities and institutes joined the crowd on Brezhnev Square.

TASS reported:

A group of students, incited by nationalistic elements, last evening and today took to the streets of Alma-Ata expressing disapproval of the decisions of the recent plenary meeting. Hooligans, parasites and other antisocial persons made use of this situation and resorted to unlawful actions against representatives of law and order. They set fire to a food store and to private cars and insulted townspeople.

Meetings were held at factories, schools, and other institutions to condemn these actions.

Witnesses reported that the rioters were given vodka, narcotics and leaflets, indicating that the riots were not spontaneous. They disagreed with the characterization of the riot as related to nationalism or independence; they said it was a protest over Gorbachev's appointing an outsider to head the state.

As a response, the CPK Central Committee ordered troops from the Ministry of Internal Affairs, druzhiniki (volunteers), cadets, policemen, and the KGB to cordon the square and videotape the participants. The situation escalated around 5 p.m., as troops were ordered to disperse the protesters. Clashes between the security forces and the demonstrators continued throughout the night in the square and in different parts of Almaty.

The second day, protests turned into civil unrest as clashes in the streets, universities and dormitories between troops, volunteers, and militia units, and Kazakh students turned into a wide-scale armed confrontation. The clashes were not controlled until the third day. The Almaty events were followed by smaller protests and demonstrations in Shymkent, Pavlodar, Karaganda and Taldykorgan.

== Estimates of protesters ==
Estimates of the number of protesters vary.

Initial reports from Moscow said that about 200 people were involved in the riots. Later reports from the Kazakh SSR authorities estimated that the riots drew 3,000 people.

Other estimates are of at least 30,000 to 40,000 protesters, with 5,000 arrested and jailed, and an unknown number of casualties. Jeltoqsan leaders say over 60,000 Kazakhs participated in the protests nationwide.

== Loss of life ==
According to the Kazakh SSR government, there were two deaths during the riots, including a volunteer police worker and a student. Both of them had died from blows to the head. About 100 others were detained and several others were sentenced to terms in labor camps.

Sources cited by the US Library of Congress claim that at least 200 people died or were summarily executed soon after. Some accounts even estimate casualties at more than 1,000.

The writer Mukhtar Shakhanov claimed that a KGB officer testified that 168 protesters were killed. The Jeltoqsan events formed the basis of the main platforms of the Azat and Alash political parties and the Jeltoqsan movement that developed in independent Kazakhstan.

Kazakh students Kayrat Ryskulbekov and Lazat Asanova were among the victims.

== Separation from the USSR ==
In his memoirs, Nursultan Nazarbayev shared several insights regarding the December events:

Time has long proven that the December events were not an expression of reckless nationalism. Such accusations are now clearly unnecessary. World leaders at the time unanimously evaluated these events. Among them was Eduard Shevardnadze, who wrote: "During the Perestroika, in 1986, the changes in the party leadership of Kazakhstan sparked massive student protests. These demonstrations were suppressed by police forces and military units, resulting in bloodshed. However, as usual, the Politburo merely concluded that the instigators should be deemed nationalists and extremists."

In reality, the students' protest was a spontaneous expression of a reawakening national consciousness. Consequently, efforts to identify an "underground nationalist organization" or specific organizers proved to be futile. It's well-known that looking for a black cat in a dark room, especially when it's not there, is a thankless task.

There were also other issues that deeply affected the national sentiments of the youth, notably the so-called "quota obsession" in determining the ethnic composition of the student body—a practice some leaders had begun to enforce rigorously just before the events. It's worth noting that such policies had been implemented with the endorsement of high-ranking ideologues in the republic.

In the March 1991 referendum, the population of Kazakhstan overwhelmingly voted to reform the Union Treaty. 89.2% of the population participated in the vote, of which 94.1% voted in favour.

On 18 September 2006, the Dawn of Liberty monument, dedicated to the 20th anniversary of Jeltoqsan, was opened with a solemn ceremony in Almaty. In the 21st century, Jeltoqsan has come to be regarded as the symbol of Kazakhstan's struggle for independence. The monument has three-parts: two pylons of intricate shapes symbolizing the breach and conflict of past and future, the explosion of the nation's consciousness and downfall of ideological canons, and the triumph of liberty and independence of the state.

== See also ==
- Dissolution of the Soviet Union
- The Barricades
- January Events
- 1990 Dushanbe riots
- Black January
- 9 April tragedy
- 2019 Kazakh protests
- 2022 Kazakh unrest
