= Ivan Yakovlev (politician) =

Soviet politician

- Иван Яковлев

27th Chairman of the Omsk City Executive Committee
- In office 11 November 1961 – November 1964
- Preceded by: Nikolay Helmitsky
- Succeeded by: Bukhtiyarov Ivanovich

5th First Secretary of the Ulyanovsk Regional Committee of the CPSU
- In office 10 January 1958 – 7 August 1961
- Preceded by: Igor Skulkov
- Succeeded by: Anatoly Skochilov

7th First Secretary of the Communist Party of the Kazakh SSR
- In office 6 March 1956 – 26 December 1957
- Preceded by: Leonid Brezhnev
- Succeeded by: Nikolai Belyaev

Second Secretary of the Central Committee of the Communist Party of Kazakhstan
- In office 6 August 1955 – 6 March 1956
- Preceded by: Leonid Brezhnev
- Succeeded by: Nikolai Zhurin

6th First Secretary of the Novosibirsk Regional Committee of the Communist Party of the Soviet Union
- In office 18 January 1949 – 8 August 1955
- Preceded by: Mikhail Kulagin
- Succeeded by: Boris Deryugin

Personal details
- Born: 5 January 1910 Tomsk Governorate, Russian Empire
- Died: 26 December 1999 (aged 89) Moscow, Russia
- Resting place: Kuntsevo Cemetery
- Party: Communist Party of the Soviet Union
- Education: Higher Party School under the Central Committee of the CPSU

Ivan Dmitrievich Yakovlev (Russian: Иван Дмитриевич Яковлев; 5 January 1910 – 26 December 1999) was a Soviet politician who served as the First Secretary of the Novosibirsk Regional Committee of the CPSU from 18 January 1949 to 8 August 1955, and the First Secretary of the Communist Party of the Kazakh SSR from 6 March 1956 to 26 December 1957.

== Biography ==
Ivan Yakovlev was born into a peasant family, in Tomsk Governorate, Russian Empire. He was the member of the Communist Party of the Soviet Union (Bolsheviks) since 1928. In 1949, he graduated from the Higher Party School under the Central Committee of the CPSU (Bolsheviks). He worked at the Pospelikhinsky District Committee of the Komsomol.

In 1930, arrived in Novosibirsk to help build the "Sibkombain" plant, edited a factory newspaper, served as secretary of the Komsomol committee, and worked in the party committee. After serving in the Pacific Fleet, he returned to the plant’s party committee.

Since 1930, he held various Soviet and party positions:

- 1930–1931: Head of the Agitation and Propaganda Department and Executive Secretary of the Pospelikhinsky District Committee of the Komsomol (West Siberian Region).
- 1931–1932: Editor of the newspaper Dayoš' Kombain (Novosibirsk).
- 1932–1933: Secretary of the Komsomol Committee of Sibkombainstroy (Novosibirsk).
- 1933–1935: Served in the Red Army, Deputy Secretary of the VKP(b) Committee of Plant No. 179 (Novosibirsk).
- 1935–1937: Head of the Kirov District Department of Public Education and Cultural-Educational Department of the Kirov District Committee of the VKP(b) (Novosibirsk).
- 1937–1938: Secretary of the VKP(b) Committee of Plant No. 179 (Novosibirsk).
- 1938–1939: Director of Secondary School No. 9 (Novosibirsk).
- 1939: Head of the Novosibirsk City Department of Public Education.
- 1939–1940: First Secretary of the Kirov District Committee of the VKP(b) in Novosibirsk.

Later, he held senior party and government positions:

- 1940–1944: Third, then Second Secretary of the Novosibirsk City Committee of the VKP(b); from March to July 1941, simultaneously Chairman of the Executive Committee of the Novosibirsk City Council.
- 1944–1946: Second Secretary of the Novosibirsk Regional Committee of the VKP(b). During World War II, oversaw the defense industry.
- 1949–1955: First Secretary of the Novosibirsk Regional Committee of the VKP(b)-CPSU.
- 1955–1956: Second Secretary of the Central Committee of the Communist Party of Kazakhstan.
- 1956–1957: First Secretary of the Central Committee of the Communist Party of Kazakhstan.
- 1958–1961: First Secretary of the Ulyanovsk Regional Committee of the CPSU.
- 1961–1964: Chairman of the Executive Committee of the Omsk City Council.
- 1964–1973: Deputy Chairman of the Executive Committee of the Omsk Regional Council.

He was the member of the CPSU Central Committee from 1952 to 1961. Deputy of the Supreme Soviet of the USSR for the 3rd to 5th convocations. He retired in 1973. He died on 26 December 1999, and was buried in Moscow at the Kuntsevo Cemetery.

== Awards ==
Order of Lenin, two times
Order of the October Revolution (17 January 1980)
Order of the Red Banner of Labor, three times
Order of the Badge of Honour (29 March 1965)
