= Communist Party of Kazakhstan (Soviet Union) =

Communist Party of Kazakhstan Қазақстан Коммунистік партиясы (Kazakh) Коммунистическая партия Казахстана (Russian)
- Abbreviation: QKP
- First leader: Levon Mirzoyan
- Last leader: Nursultan Nazarbayev
- Founded: 5 December 1936; 89 years ago
- Dissolved: 7 September 1991; 35 years ago
- Succeeded by: Socialist Party (de jure); Communist Party (de facto)
- Ideology: Communism; Marxism–Leninism
- National affiliation: Communist Party of the Soviet Union
- Colours: Red
- Supreme Soviet (1990): 342 / 360 (95%)

The Communist Party of Kazakhstan (QKP; Kazakh: Қазақстан Коммунистік партиясы, Qazaqstan Kommunistık Partiasy) was the ruling and sole legal political party in the Kazakh SSR.

== Origin ==
The Communist Party of Kazakhstan was founded in 1936 as the Communist Party (Bolsheviks) of Kazakhstan, when Kazakhstan was granted a Union Republic status within the Soviet Union. The Communist Party of Kazakhstan had been a branch of Communist Party of the Soviet Union (CPSU) until the dissolution of the Soviet Union.

April 24, 1990 from Art. 6 of the Constitution of the Kazakh SSR, the provision on the monopoly of the Communist Party of Kazakhstan on power was excluded.

== Post-Soviet restructuring ==
The 18th Congress of the Communist Party of Kazakhstan, held on September 7, 1991, decided to dissolve the party. The Socialist Party was created on its basis. Nursultan Nazarbayev, chairman of the party, resigned after the failure of the August putsch in Moscow. Dissatisfied members of the old Communist Party recreated the Communist Party of Kazakhstan in October 1991 at the 19th Congress of the party.

== First Secretaries ==
No.	Chairman (birth–death)		Term of office			Political party	Ref
No.	Portrait	Name	Took office	Left office	Time in office	Political party	Ref
1		Levon Mirzoyan; Левон Мирзоян (1897–1939)	23 April 1937	23 May 1938	1 year, 30 days	Communist (Bolsheviks)	—
1		Levon Mirzoyan; Левон Мирзоян (1897–1939)	Oversaw early famine relief and collectivization; arrested in 1938 during Great Purge and executed in February 1939.				—
2		Nikolay Skvortsov; Николай Скворцов (1899–1974)	23 May 1938	23 July 1945	7 years, 61 days	Communist (Bolsheviks)	—
2		Nikolay Skvortsov; Николай Скворцов (1899–1974)	Guided the republic through wartime mobilization relocating factories during World War II and post‑war reconstruction.				—
3		Gennady Borkov; Геннадий Борков (1905–1983)	23 July 1945	22 June 1946	334 days	Communist (Bolsheviks)	—
3		Gennady Borkov; Геннадий Борков (1905–1983)	Served briefly in the immediate post‑war period during demobilization; little else is documented about his short tenure.				—
4		Zhumabay Shayakhmetov; Жұмабай Шаяхметов (1902–1966)	22 June 1946	6 February 1954	7 years, 229 days	Communist (Bolsheviks)	—
4		Zhumabay Shayakhmetov; Жұмабай Шаяхметов (1902–1966)	First ethnic Kazakh in the post; removed in February 1954 under Khrushchev's reorganizations amid allegations of corruption.				—
5		Panteleimon Ponomarenko; Пантелеймон Пономаренко (1902–1984)	6 February 1954	7 May 1955	1 year, 90 days	Communist	—
5		Panteleimon Ponomarenko; Пантелеймон Пономаренко (1902–1984)	Transferred from Byelorussian SSR as a transitional figure after Stalin's death; served just over a year before being reassigned.				—
6		Leonid Brezhnev; Леонид Брежнев (1906–1982)	8 May 1955	6 March 1956	303 days	Communist	—
6		Leonid Brezhnev; Леонид Брежнев (1906–1982)	Promoted from Second Secretary to lead Virgin Lands campaign and Baikonur development; recalled to Moscow in March 1956 after disappointing harvests.				—
7		Ivan Yakovlev; Иван Яковлев (1910–1999)	6 March 1956	26 December 1957	1 year, 295 days	Communist	—
7		Ivan Yakovlev; Иван Яковлев (1910–1999)	Elevated from Second to First Secretary during the Khrushchev Thaw; oversaw de‑Stalinization measures and defense‑industry conversion.				—
8		Nikolai Belyaev; Николай Беляев (1903–1966)	26 December 1957	19 January 1960	2 years, 24 days	Communist	—
8		Nikolai Belyaev; Николай Беляев (1903–1966)	Noted for advancing agricultural and economic policies; dismissed in January 1960 due to a downturn in agricultural output and the harsh suppression of the 1959 Temirtau riots.				—
9		Dinmukhamed Kunaev; Дінмұхамед Қонаев (1912–1993)	19 January 1960	26 December 1962	2 years, 341 days	Communist	—
9		Dinmukhamed Kunaev; Дінмұхамед Қонаев (1912–1993)	—				—
10		Ismail Yusupov; Ысмайыл Юсупов (1914–2005)	26 December 1962	7 December 1964	1 year, 347 days	Communist	—
10		Ismail Yusupov; Ысмайыл Юсупов (1914–2005)	Succeeded Kunaev amid Khrushchev's regional reshuffling; initiated the transfer of several South Kazakhstan regions to the Uzbek SSR and was later dismissed at Brezhnev's suggestion.				—
11		Dinmukhamed Kunaev; Дінмұхамед Қонаев (1912–1993)	7 December 1964	16 December 1986	22 years, 9 days	Communist	—
11		Dinmukhamed Kunaev; Дінмұхамед Қонаев (1912–1993)	After a brief hiatus (replaced in 1962), he returned to lead for over 22 years overseeing massive industrialization and former Virgin Lands efforts and was removed in December 1986 by Gorbachev, causing the Jeltoqsan protests.				—
12		Gennady Kolbin; Геннадий Колбин (1927–1998)	16 December 1986	22 June 1989	2 years, 188 days	Communist	—
12		Gennady Kolbin; Геннадий Колбин (1927–1998)	Appointed by Gorbachev as an outsider with no prior work in Kazakhstan; his imposition sparked the Jeltoqsan protests.				—
13		Nursultan Nazarbayev; Нұрсұлтан Назарбаев (1940–)	22 June 1989	28 August 1991	2 years, 67 days	Communist	—
13		Nursultan Nazarbayev; Нұрсұлтан Назарбаев (1940–)	Last First Secretary; oversaw the exclusion of Article 6 (ending one‑party monopoly) on 24 October 1990 and the transition to the Presidency in April 1990 before office was abolished in September 1991.				—

== See also ==
- Alma-Ata Regional Committee of the Communist Party of Kazakhstan
- Qizil Tugh
