= Kazakhstanskaya Pravda =

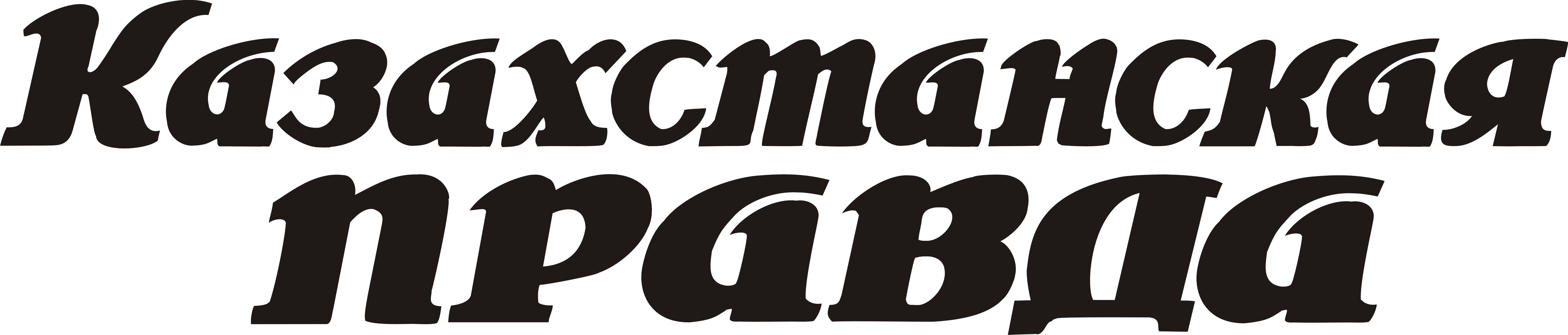
- Format: 1920
- Owner(s): Government
- Language: Russian language
- Website: www.kazpravda.kz

Kazakhstanskaya Pravda (Russian: Казахстанская правда, lit. 'Kazakhstani Truth') is a Kazakh newspaper that is government-backed. The paper was first published on 1 February 1920. as Izvestia of the Kyrgyz Region before receiving its current name in 1932. The paper was started by the ministry of information and public accord. It is published in the Russian language.

== See also ==
- Media of Kazakhstan
