= Ismail Yusupov =

Soviet politician; First Secretary of the Communist Party of Kazakhstan (1914-2005)

- Ысмайыл Юсупов ئىسمايىل يۈسۈپ

First Secretary of the Communist Party of the Kazakh SSR
- In office 26 December 1962 – 7 December 1964
- Preceded by: Dinmukhamed Kunaev
- Succeeded by: Dinmukhamed Kunaev

Personal details
- Born: 12 May 1914 Sofiiskaya, Semirechye Oblast, Russian Empire (now Talgar, Kazakhstan)
- Died: 17 May 2005 (aged 91) Almaty, Kazakhstan
- Party: Communist Party of the Soviet Union (1939-1991)
- Awards: Order of Lenin (2); Order of Red Banner

Military service
- Branch/service: Red Army
- Years of service: 1940–1942
- Battles/wars: World War II; Siege of Leningrad

Ismail Abdurasulovich Yusupov (Uyghur: ئىسمايىل يۈسۈپ, Kazakh: Ысмайыл Юсупов; 12 May 1914 – 16 May 2005) was a member of the Uyghur minority and a Soviet Communist from 1962 to 1964 and in that era he was first secretary of the Communist Party of the Kazakh SSR. After Khrushchev was ousted in 1964, Yusupov was replaced with Dinmukhamed Akhmedovich Kunayev, a close friend of Brezhnev's. Until his retirement in 1971, he held several lower functions in the field of agriculture.

== Early life ==
Yusupov was born in 1914 at Sofiiskaya. In infancy, Yusupov lost his mother, so he was raised by his stepmother. For four years Yusupov studied at the Uyghur secondary school named after A. Sufi Zarvata. After graduating from school, Yusupov's parents decided that since he had learned to read and write, he could well earn his own living.

Yusupov ended up in the Alma-Ata orphanage, where he helped in preparing children for admission to technical schools. Two years of preparatory courses and Yusupov entered the Talgar Agricultural College, where he graduated in 1934. Immediately after graduation, Yusupov was sent to the South Kazakhstan region, to the Turkestan MTS, where he worked as an agronomist, and a year later he left for Leningrad, where he studied at the higher agronomic courses for two years. In 1937, Yusupov returned to Turkestan, but already as a senior agronomist. A year later, in 1938, Yusupov became the director of the Turkestan MTS.

A few months later, Yusupov was elected a deputy of the Supreme Soviet of Kazakhstan. He was transferred to Chimkent, Kazakh SSR, where he worked first as a deputy head of the South Kazakhstan regional land department, later as the head of the South Kazakhstan regional water management department.

== Military career ==
In 1940, he enlisted in the Red Army and then graduated from the Minsk Military Academy for political officers.

From June 1941 to July 1942 he was on the Leningrad front attached to a skiing assault battalion as a political officer, during the siege of Leningrad. In this position, Yusupov received his first wound. In the fall, from the hospital, Yusupov was summoned to the Politburo, where he was given the task of organizing a ski-landing battalion. The Germans were in the city, and Yusupov's battalion continued the partisan war behind enemy lines. In the fall of 1942, Yusupov was wounded a second time, this time severely. This was the end of Yusupov's participation in combat battles during the Great Patriotic War. In addition to other formal recognition he was awarded the Order of Red Banner for his service during the war.

== Political career ==
Following his service in the Red Army, Yusupov served as Minister of Water Resources of the Kazakh SSR. After graduating from the Higher Party School under the Central Committee of the CPSU, he headed one of the leading regions during the Virgin Lands campaign: the Second Secretary of the Kostanay Regional Committee of the Communist Party of Kazakhstan.

In 1955, he was appointed as the First Secretary of the South Kazakhstan Regional Committee of the Communist Party of Kazakhstan and from 1959, he became the Secretary of the Central Committee of the Communist Party of Kazakhstan. From 1959 to 1962, he served as the Secretary of the Central Committee of the Communist Party of Kazakhstan. On 1962, he served as First Secretary of the South Kazakhstan Regional Committee of the Communist Party of Kazakhstan.

On 1962, Yusupov was elected to replace Dinmukhamed Kunaev as the First Secretary of the Communist Party of Kazakhstan, after Kunaev disagreed with Nikita Khrushchev's plans to incorporate some lands in Southern Kazakhstan into Uzbekistan. During his tenure as the first secretary of the Central Committee of the Communist Party of Kazakhstan, on Yusupov's initiative, several regions of South Kazakhstan were transferred to Uzbek SSR. Kunaev, who served as the First Secretary of the Kazakh Communist Party for 24 years and Yusupov's successor, wrote in his memoirs, that Yusupov did not work well with many fellow party members, being at the head of the Kazakh SSR. He also did not stay in Uralsk, being the chairman of the regional executive committee.

Yusupov was dismissed from the post of the first secretary of the Central Committee of the Communist Party of Kazakhstan at the suggestion of Leonid Brezhnev. After his dismissal from his position, Yusupov served as the chairman of the Ural Regional Executive Committee, from 1965 to 1966. His final position was as head of the Republican Trust of Viticulture State Farms in Kazakhstan, from 1966 to 1971.

Yusupov was the member of the Central Committee of the CPSU from 1961 to 1966. He was the candidate member of the CPSU Central Committee from 1961 to 1966. He also served as the deputy of the Supreme Soviet of the USSR of the 5th and 6th convocations. Yusupov was the deputy of the Supreme Soviet of the Kazakh SSR from 1938 to 1967.

== Later life ==
Yusupov was married to Anastasia Petrovna. They had three daughters and one son.

He helped establish Uyghur region within the Almaty Oblast, as well as the Uyghur National Theater. Yusupov died on May 17, 2005, in Almaty, at the age of 91.

== Honours and awards ==
- Order of Lenin, twice
- Order of the Red Banner
- Order of the Patriotic War, 1st class, twice
- Order of the Red Banner of Labour, twice
- Medal "For Labour Valour"
- Medal "For Distinguished Labour"
- Medal "For the Defence of Leningrad"
- Medal "For the Victory over Germany in the Great Patriotic War 1941–1945"
