= Kazakh art =

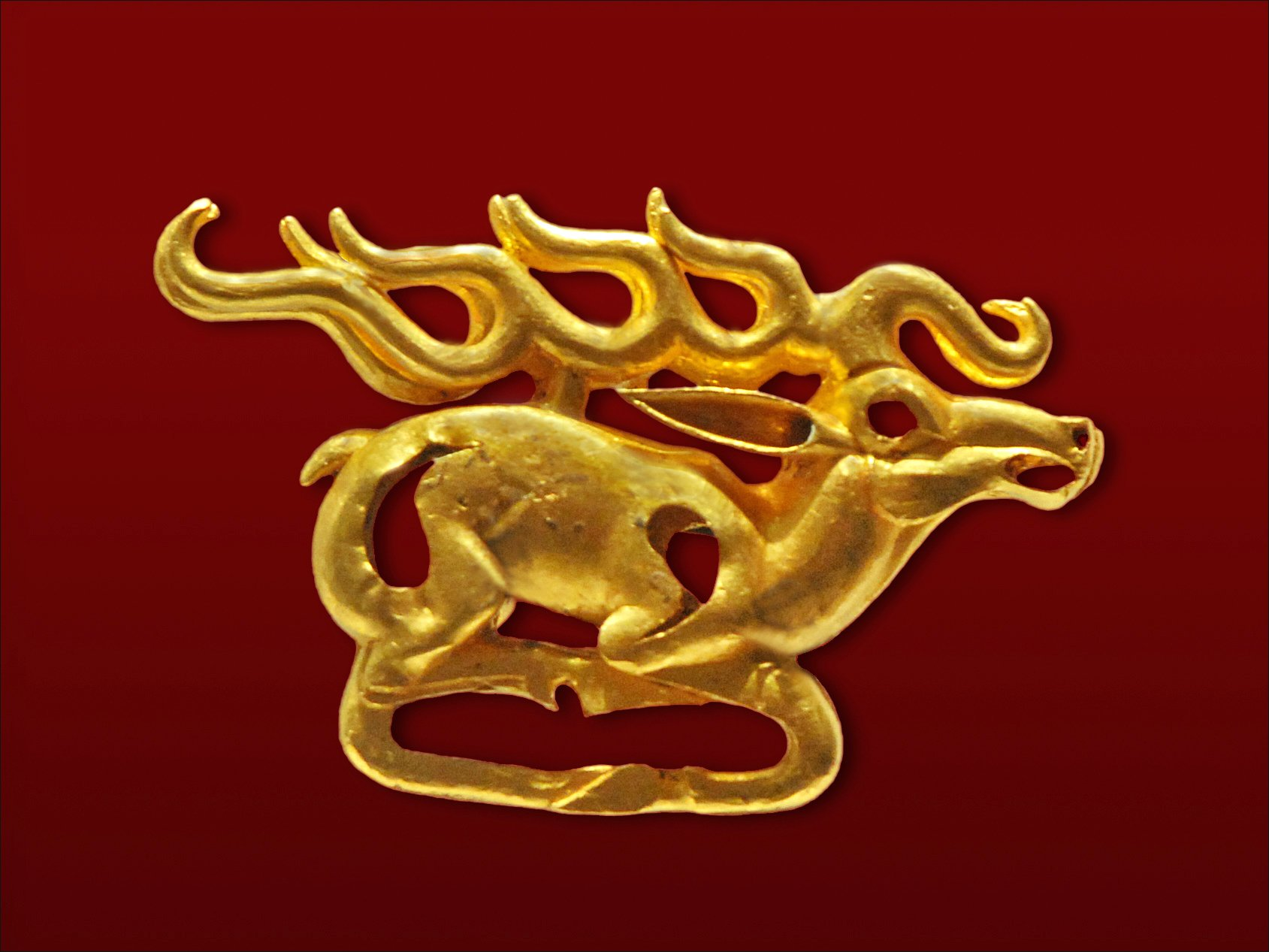
Deer - Kazakh garment applique, 8-7th century BC. Scythian art

The art of Kazakhstan covers all forms of art created throughout history by the peoples living on the territory of modern-day Kazakhstan. Throughout most periods, much of the population of Kazakhstan was nomadic, or at least moved regularly across the vast country. The great majority of the art of Kazakhstan is applied art: the decoration of practical objects, including household utensils and patterned harnesses, through art forms such as carpet-weaving, pottery, and leatherwork. The art of Kazakhstan also includes architecture, fine arts, and sculpture.

Although modern Kazakhs are often keen to assert its national character, Kazakh art has at most times been intimately connected with wider artistic styles, in particular the Scythian art of the first millennium BC, and Islamic art from the 8th century AD onwards. In the 19th and 20th centuries, Russian art was the dominant influence.

== History ==
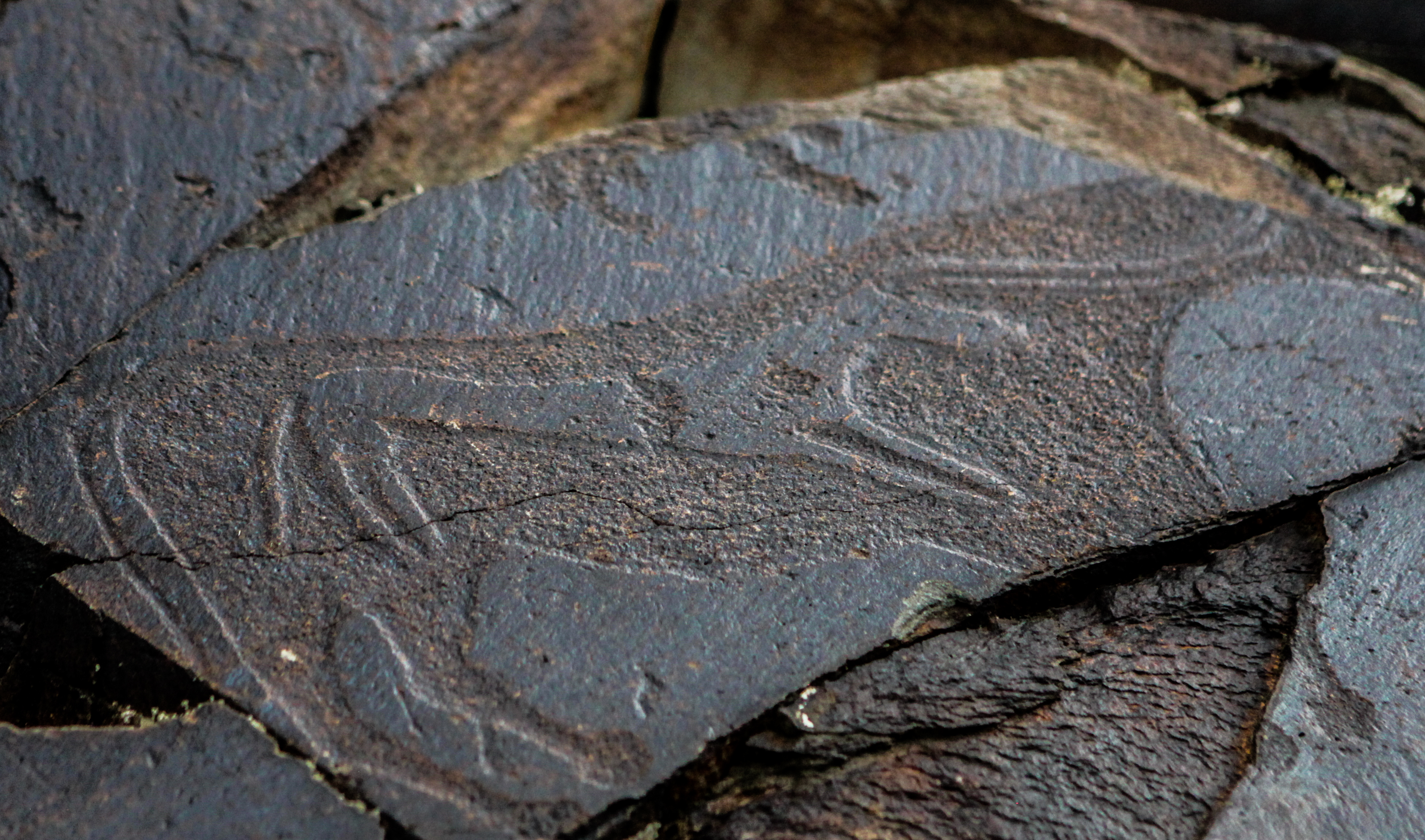
Petroglyphs in Tamgaly, Kazakhstan

=== Prehistory ===
Prehistoric rock engravings and paintings occupy a prominent place among Kazakhstan's monuments. Rock engravings, or petroglyphs, embossed in the rock with stone or metal tools, are particularly common, and the geology and landforms of the country's mountain ranges lent themselves to the proliferation of this art form. The absence of anthropogenic impact across most of the country has resulted in preservation of many of monuments, providing rich material for study.

The earliest examples of art in Kazakhstan are Paleolithic. Found in the Hantau and Karatau Mountains, they take the form of animal images carved into the rocks.

Neolithic and Bronze Age petroglyphs found in the Bayanaulsky cave (Pavlodar region), and in the Tanbaly gorge (Almaty region) (where the images include an elk, a lion, a hunter with a bow, an ox harnessed to a cart, and a cow) and on the northern shores of Lake Balkhash (a duel between two men with sabers, next to which stands a girl, and others) give an idea of the main occupations and customs of the ancient tribes inhabiting the territory of modern Kazakhstan.

The petroglyphs of the Tamgaly archaeological complex, one of the most ancient and vivid rock art monuments of the "Seven Rivers" (Zhetysu, or Semirechye) area near Lake Balkhash, lie 170 km north-west of the city of Almaty in the Anrakai Mountains. The rock paintings and engravings were discovered in 1957 by an archaeological expedition of the Kazakhstan Academy of Sciences, under the direction of A. G. Maximova. Study of the sanctuary there, with its many cave paintings, began in the 1970s and 1980s. There are some 2000 petroglyphs, most of which are located in the lower part of the main gorge and on the side of the adjacent gorge to the west.

The themes of the drawings are diverse, and include human figures, animals, horsemen, people and predatory animals hunting, scenes of daily life, ritual dances, sun-headed deities, and multi-figure compositions depicting scenes of people and animals, of hunting animals and of bull sacrifice. The most common images are of horses; deer, which symbolize power and beauty in Kazakh art; and eagles, representing immortality and the sky.

In the Bronze Age, the territory of modern Kazakhstan was inhabited by people of the Andronovo culture, and the Begazy–Dandybai culture in the south. The Andronovo culture processed metal ores, including gold, copper, and probably silver. In some areas this was a large-scale industry. Although significant survivals are rare, it is clear that textiles, mostly woolen, were in general use for clothing, along with leather and fur. Clothing was often richly decorated with metal and stone jewellery. Greek descriptions of Iron Age steppe nomad dress survive, along with Greek and Persian depictions of related steppe-dwelling peoples.

=== Protohistory ===
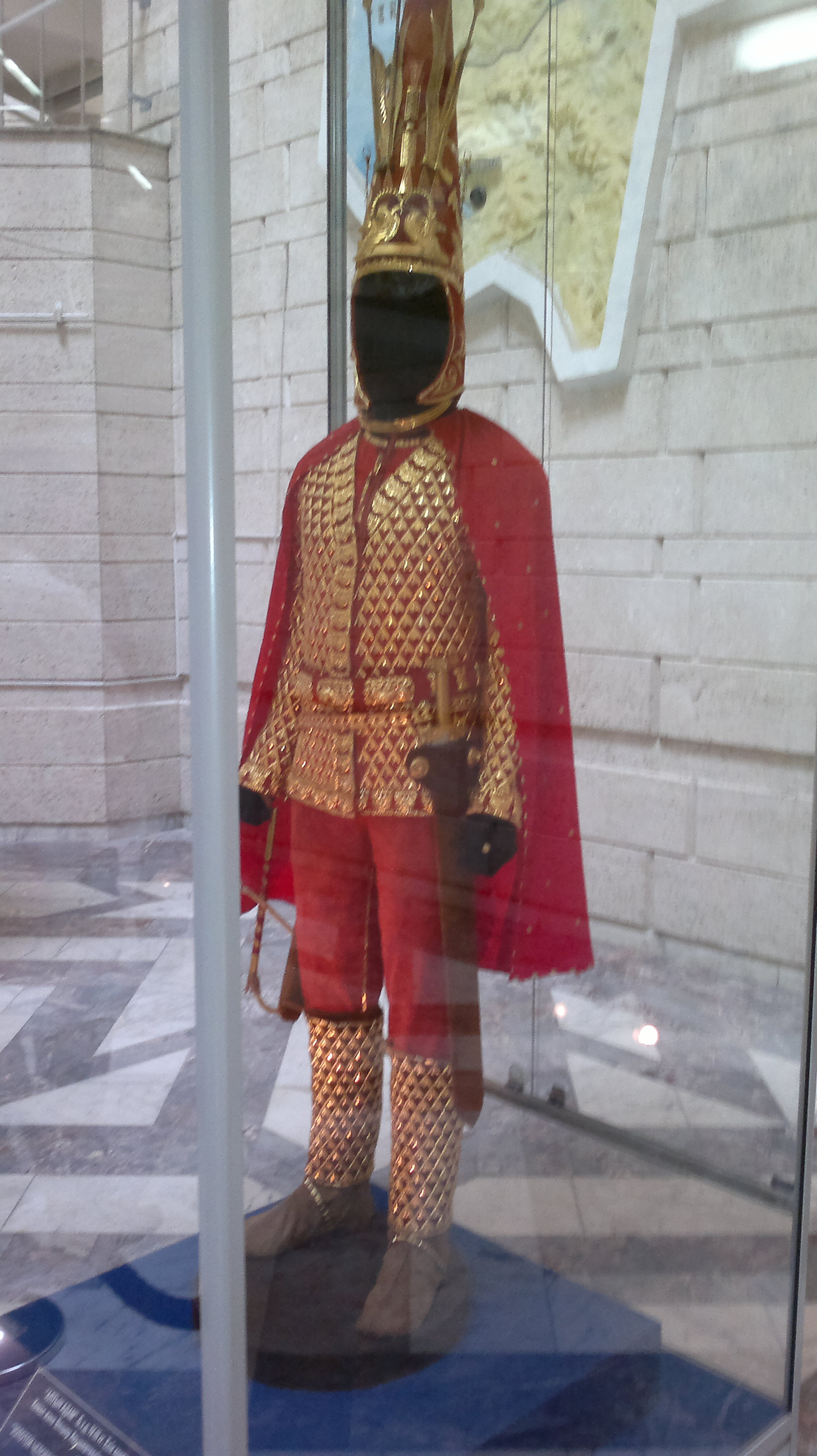
Golden Man replica in the Central State Museum

In the first millennium BC, the territory of present-day Kazakhstan in the Ili River area was occupied by the Saka tribes, whose works of art formed part of the wider tradition of Scythian art across the Eurasian Steppe. Most artifacts found have come from kurgan burial mounds. The most famous Saka-era discovery was made in the Issyk kurgan in south-eastern Kazakhstan, near Almaty city, in 1969. Known as the "Golden Man", this wealthy Saka man or woman was costumed in armor, boots and hat decorated with many gold plates, so that the burial resembled a statue in precious metals. Most of the jewelry found was of gold, made by casting, stamping, embossing, and engraving in the form of circular sculpture, high relief and bas-relief.

The "Golden Man" wears a high-peaked turban decorated with golden plates depicting horses, snow leopards, birds, and trees with spreading crowns, and a necklace in the form of a golden hoop with a tiger head at each extremity. In the lobe of the left ear is a gold earring with a turquoise ornament. A sword in a sheath covered with red leather hangs from the belt to the right, and to the left is an iron dagger in a sheath with gold overlays depicting a galloping moose and a horse. On gold plates on both sides of the dagger are carved animal figures, among them the wolf, fox, mountain sheep, fallow deer, fox, and snake. The tall hat compares with the tall saukele head-dress that is today part of the traditional wedding costume for Kazakh women.

The treasures of the Issyk mound, including an exact copy of the "Golden Man", were originally exhibited at the Kazakh Museum of Archeology in Almaty, and are now at the State Museum of Gold and Precious Metals of the Republic of Kazakhstan in Astana.

The "golden man" on the winged leopard has become one of the main symbols of Kazakhstan.

Many "balbals" or kurgan stelae, monoliths shaped like human figures, have been found topping kurgans, or surrounding them in groups.

=== Islamic period ===
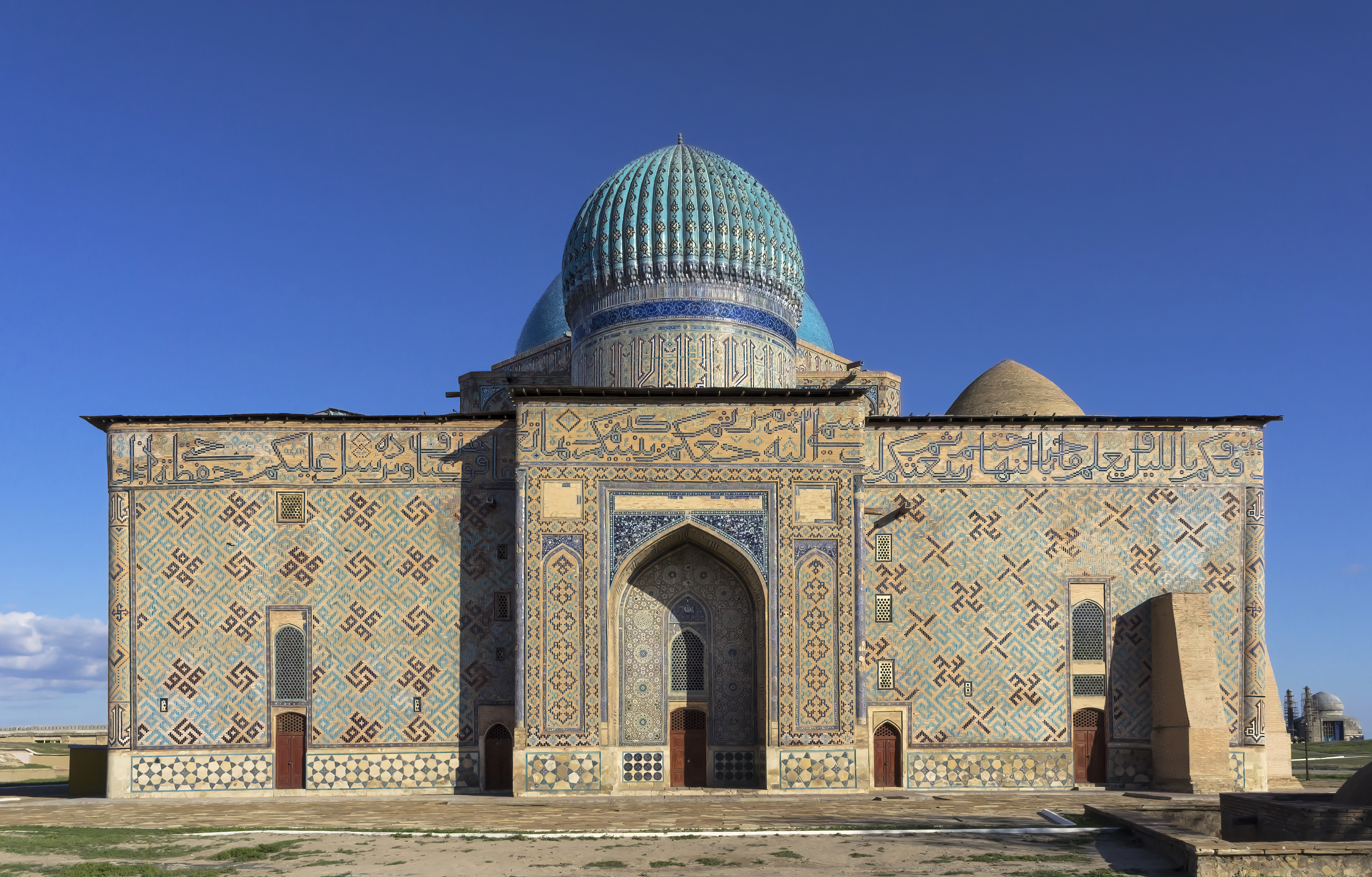
Mausoleum of Khoja Ahmed Yasawi, in the city of Turkistan, 1389.

In the Middle Ages, various states succeeded each other across the territory of modern Kazakhstan. Active trade along the Great Silk Road enriched the culture of the people who lived there, bringing new art techniques and influencing the creativity of local artists.

On the Silk Road, the cities of Isfijab, Yangikent, Suyab, Kayalyk Mirki, and Kulan in the valleys of the rivers Syr Darya, Talas, Chu, and Ili were centers of culture, religion, and trade, providing a connection between agricultural oases and nomadic steppe, between East and West.

The medieval centers of culture, science, and art were the cities of Otrar, Taraz, Balasagun, Sygnak, and Sauran, among many others. The mausoleums of Babaji-Khatun (10th–11th centuries), Aisha-Bibi (11th–12th centuries), Alash-khan (12th–14th centuries), Dzhuchi-khan (13th century), Kozy-Korpesh, and Bayan-Slu (8th–10th centuries), and the tower of Tamerlane (14th century) are considered unique examples of the architecture of this time. The Khoja Ahmed Yassavi Mausoleum complex, in the city of Turkistan, stands out as one of the largest architectural monuments not only of Kazakhstan but of Central Asia. Built by order of Timur (14th century) in honor of the preacher Yassavi, the mausoleum was constructed of fired brick, set inside and out with multi-colored blue and white tiles, and decorated with carved elements, tiled Arabic inscriptions, mosaic work and painted majolica. The central hall contains a huge cauldron cast from an alloy of seven metals, which was exhibited in the State Hermitage Museum in Saint Petersburg, Russia, between 1935 and its return in 1989.

In the 14th and 15th centuries, great progress was made in the use of architectural elements such as arches, vaults, and domes. The medieval builders attached great importance to their building materials, and already at that time brick and glazes of notable quality were made. Particular attention was paid to the quality of the bricks, most of which were square in shape with one side painted blue, white or green. Such bricks were laid simultaneously with the building of external walls. Polychrome majolica tiles were also used in wall decoration. In the interiors, murals and relief ornaments began to appear. Applied art featured widely in the construction of the mausoleums of Khoja Ahmed Yasawi, Kok-Kesen and Alash Khan.

In the Middle Ages, among other applied arts, carpet-weaving and pottery became widespread in Kazakhstan. Richly patterned carpets were used both in the home, as decoration, and worn, as protection against the elements.

Common patterns ornamenting carpets, household items and kitchen utensils included floral motifs, hunting scenes, folk games, animals, and birds. The image of the horse as a central motif is found throughout Kazakhstan, personifying beauty and power. Horses were of great cultural significance as a means of transport, especially in wartime, and were sacrificed to the gods and interred alongside warriors in burial mounds.

Pottery items were often decorated with inscriptions in different languages, such as Turkic, Uighur, and Sogdian. Examples include the ceramic inscriptions found in the archaeological city of Aktobe, located in the middle reaches of the Chu River. Many inscriptions found on these ceramics date back to the 9th–11th centuries.

=== Modern period ===
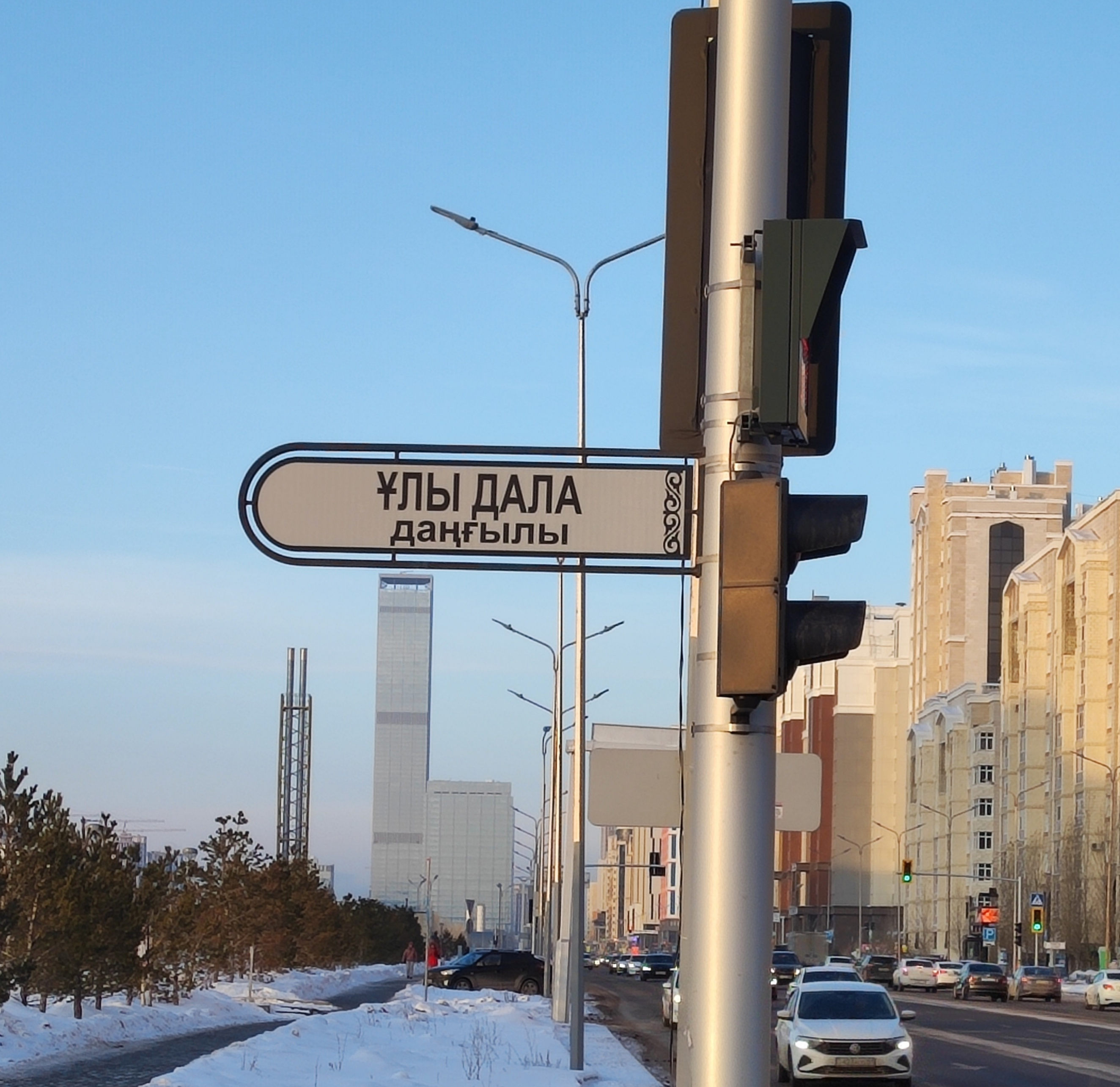
Most of the street signs in Astana feature Kazakh ornaments

In Kazakhstan, fine art in the classical sense has its origins in the 19th century and the influence of Russian artists Vasily Vereshchagin and Nikolai Khludov, who travelled in Central Asia and portrayed what they saw. Khludov had a particular influence on the development of the local school of painting, becoming the teacher of many local artists. The most famous of these is Abilkhan Kasteev, after whom the State Museum of Art of Kazakhstan was renamed. Among other influential painters of that period Kazakh scholars mention Sergei Kalmykov.

The Kazakh school of art was fully formed by the 1940s, and flourished in the 1950s. Local painters, graphic artists and sculptors, trained under the unified Soviet system of artist education, began active work, often using national motifs in their art. The painters S. Aitbaev, S. Mambayev, O. Tansykbaev, J. Shardenov, and M. Telzhanov, graphic artists A. Duzelkhanov and E. Sidorkina, and sculptors H. Nauryzbaeva and E. Sergebaeva are today counted among the key figures of Kazakhstani art.

An avant-garde movement formed in Kazakhstan in the late 1980s, aiming to find fresh ideas and protest against established forms and images in art. Various principles of plastic art began to appear, for example in B. Tulkeev's highly complex psychological compositions, A. Sydykhanov's mystical graphic compositions, A. Akanaeva's Picasso-like improvised compositions, and D. Aliyev's chaotic figurative pieces. K. Duisenbaev used principles of plastic art in expressive formalism to convey the inner forces of nature and the soul. K. Akhmetzhanov's canvases optically assemble colored pieces to produce a picture of the world that reflects surrounding realities. The works of A. Menlibayev and E. Ghazaryan exemplify a revival of interest in the folklore and ornamental style of a range of historical, regional and cultural tradition.

Since Kazakhstan's declaration of independence, on 16 December 1991, there have been cardinal changes in all spheres: political, economic, social and art. The monument to Ablai Khan in Astana (sculptor N. Dalbai, architect Sh. Valikhanov) made a considerable contribution to approval of the idea of independence of Kazakhstan. Other landmarks of modern monumental sculpture of this time are the equestrian monument to Isatay Taimanov and Makhambet Utemisov in Atyrau (sculptor B. Abishev and E. Sergebaev), and the monument to Sultan Baybars in Atyrau (sculptor K. Kakimov). The Independence Monument in Almaty (sculptors: A. Zhumabaev and N. Dalbai, architect Sh. Valihanov) is a particularly well-known modern sculptural and architectural complex of this era. Located on Almaty's main square, the Independence Monument combines Kazakh cultural heritage and tradition with universal elements, and has become a symbol of statehood, and of Kazakhstan's past, present and future. The granite stele is crowned with the statue of a young warrior, styled after the "Golden Man", with a mythical winged leopard his feet.

The Kazakh national school of painting experienced difficult times in the 1990s, as the state significantly reduced its budget on the cultural programs and commissioned less works from the painters. However, by the end of the 1990s and early 2000s, the situation improved as major private and public companies have begun providing their patronage to established and young painters by funding numerous art exhibitions and commissioning painting works. At the beginning of the 20th century, several painters received wide recognition and organized their art exhibitions around Kazakhstan, including Akzhana Abdalieva, Akmaral Abulkhair, Maksim Vedernikov, Dinara Dukenbayeva, Erbolat Tolepbai, Zeinelkhan Mukhamedjan, Carmine Barbaro and many others.

Mythological symbolism is significant in Kazakhstan's modern art of the 21st century. It is expressed, for example, in the visual searching of artists Gulnara Kasmalieva and Muratbek Djumaliev's "TransSiberian Amazons" (2005) and multi-channel video art "A New Silk Road: Algorithm of Survival and Hope” (2007), and in the performance and photography of Victor and Elena Vorobievs' “(Non)Silk Road” (2006).

== Museums of Kazakhstan ==
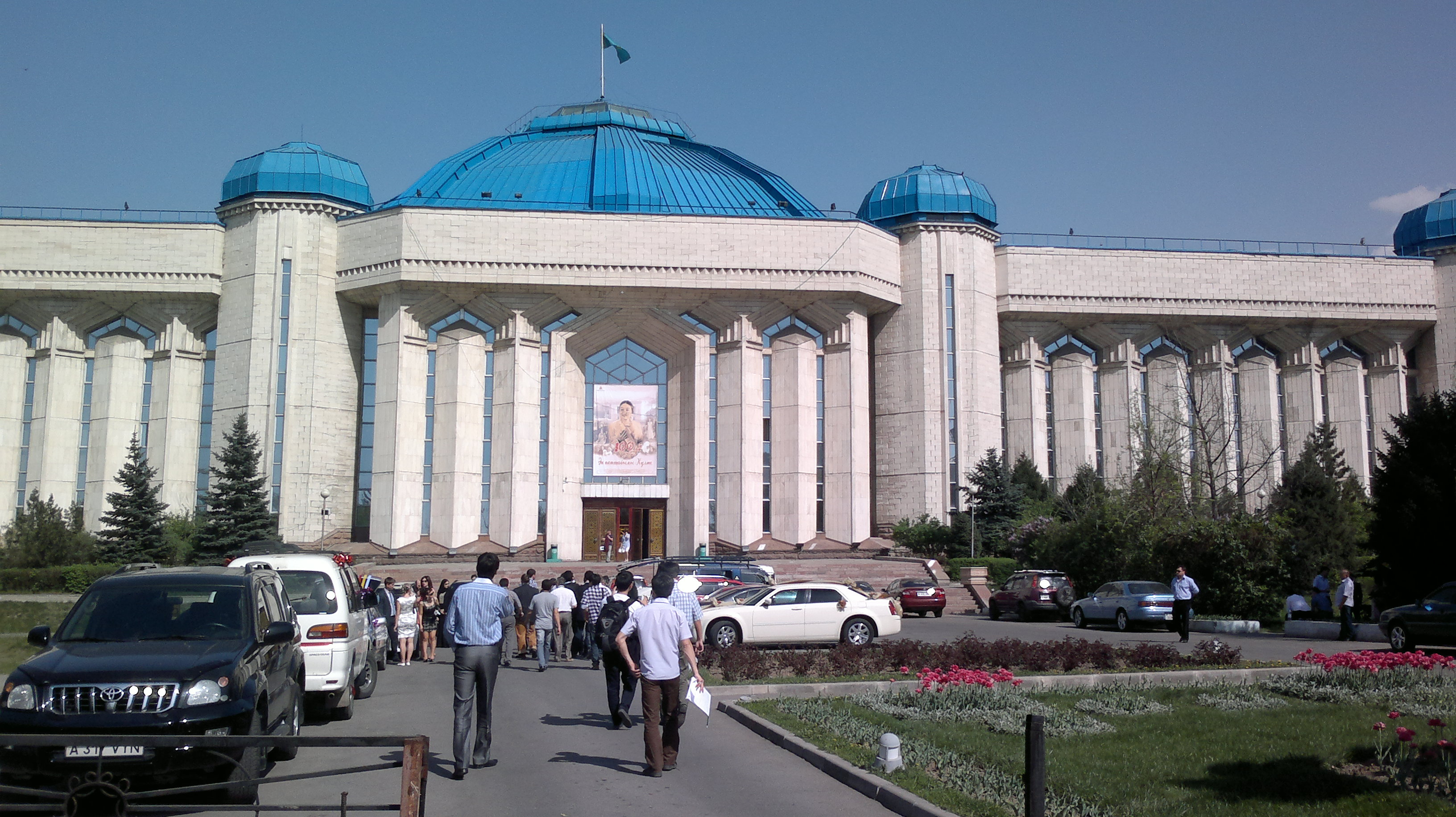
Central State Museum of the Republic of Kazakhstan

There are more than 170 museums in Kazakhstan. The oldest, the Semipalatinsk Museum of History and Local Lore, was built in 1883.

- Central State Museum of Kazakhstan
- National Museum of the Republic of Kazakhstan
- A. Kasteyev State Museum of Arts

== Kazakh artists ==
- Carmine Barbaro
- Agimsaly Duzelkhanov
- Aisha Galimbaeva
- Abilkhan Kasteev
- Leyla Mahat
- Marina Reshetnikova

== See also ==
- Music of Kazakhstan
- Kazakh literature
