= List of museums in Kazakhstan =

This is a list of museums in Kazakhstan.

== Museums in Kazakhstan ==
- National Museum of the Republic of Kazakhstan
- Central State Museum of the Republic of Kazakhstan
- Kazakhstan National Museum of Instruments
- A. Kasteyev State Museum of Arts
- Archaeological Museum of the Kazakhstan National Academy of Sciences
- State Book Museum
- Geology Museum of the Academy of Science
- Nature Museum of the Republic of Kazakhstan
- Zharkent Mosque, Architectural and Art Museum
- Zh. Zhabayev Literary Museum
- Altyn-Yemel State Memorial Shokan Valikhanov Museum
- M. Tynyshhayev Historical Museum of the Almaty Region
- Almaty History Museum
- Abai Museum
- Umai Art Museum
- Auezov Home Museum
- Kunaev Home Museum
- Baitursynov Home Museum
- Tlendiyev Memorial Museum
- Kasteev Home Museum
- Satbayev Memorial Museum
- I. Zhansugurov Literary Museum

== See also ==
- List of museums
