= Osman Yousefzada =

British designer and artist

- عثمان یوسفزاده
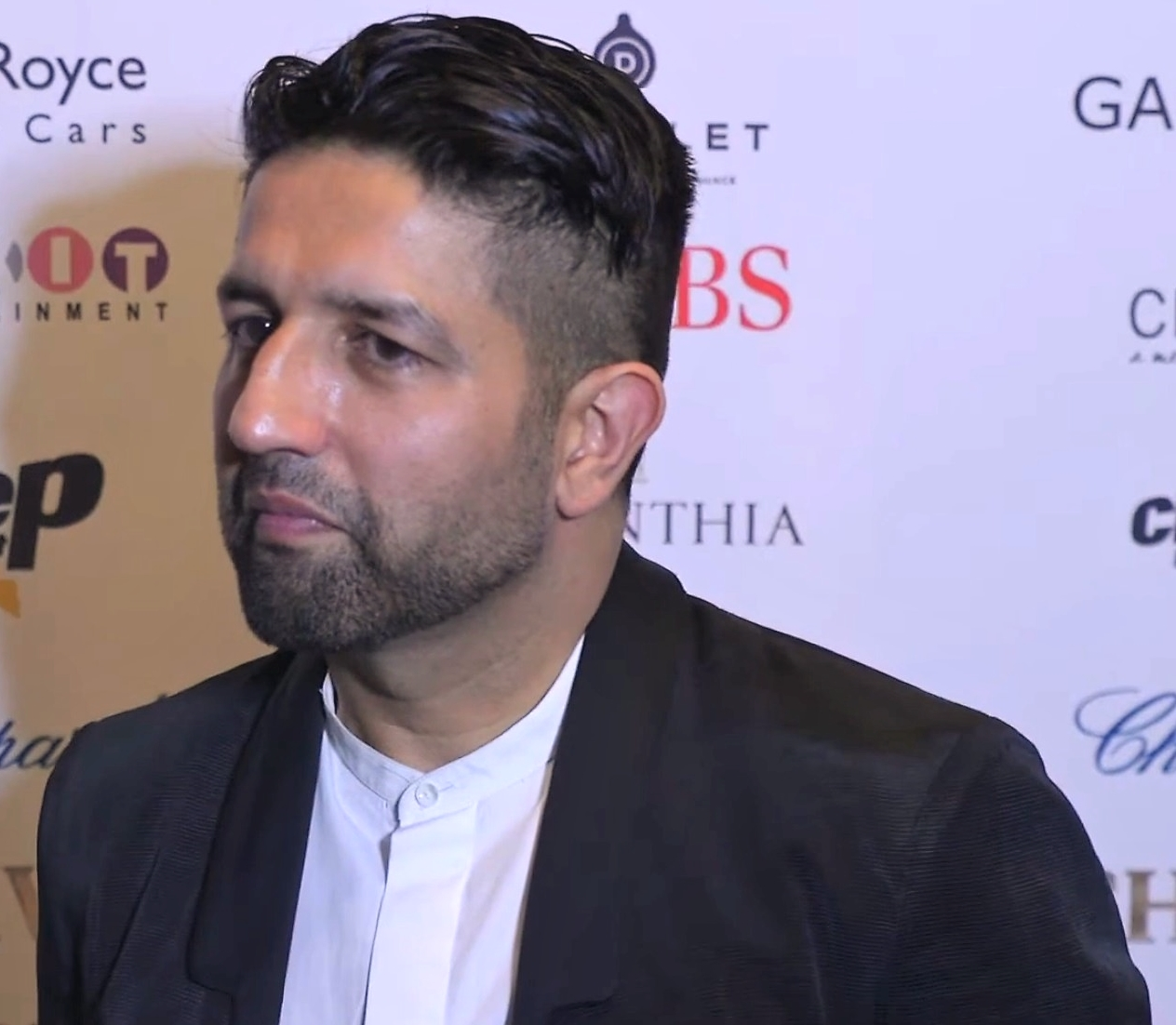
- Yousefzada in 2016 at The Asian Awards
- Born: 1977 (age 48–49); Birmingham, United Kingdom
- Education: SOAS University of London (BA); University of Cambridge (MPhil); Royal College of Art
- Occupations: Artist, writer, and social activist
- Known for: Art, fashion
- Notable work: The Go Between
- Website: osmanstudio.com

Osman Yousefzada (Pashto: عثمان یوسفزاده) is a British interdisciplinary artist, writer, and social activist. His first show was commissioned by Jerwood Arts in 2005 at the Wapping Project and was curated by Jules Wright. His art practice revolves around storytelling, merging auto-ethnography with fiction and ritual. He is a politically led artist, and is concerned with the representation and rupture of the migrational experience and makes reference in his work to socio-political issues of today. His response to the hostile language towards Immigrants used by politicians such as Suella Braverman was a series of 5000 billboards across the UK in 2023, saying ‘More Immigrants Please’ welcoming them with an Eastern Rug collaged into the text artwork.

Since 2013, Osman has been making a 'zine' called The Collective - a cross disciplinary publication of themed conversations, between writers, artists, and curators, including, Milovan Farronato, Hans Ulrich Obrist, Nicola Lees, Celia Hempton, Anthea Hamilton, Prem Singh and others.

Yousefzada has shown internationally at various institutions, from the Whitechapel Gallery, V&A, Camden Arts Centre, Dhaka Art Summit, Lahore Biennale, Lahore Museum, Cincinnati Art Museum, Ringling Museum and the Almaty Museum along with various solo exhibitions including; ‘Being Somewhere Else’ (2018) at the Ikon Gallery, What is Seen & What is Not’ (2022) at the V&A, Embodiments of Memory’ (2023) British Ceramics Biennale - Potteries Museum. ‘Queer Feet’ (2024) Charleston, ‘Where it Began’ (2024) a prelude to Bradford City of Culture at Cartwright Hall, and Welcome! A Palazzo for Immigrants (2024) presented by the Fondazione Berengo & the V&A in conjunction with the 60th Venice Biennale at Palazzo Franchetti.

== Early life and education ==
Osman Yousefzada’s More Immigrants Please aims to reimagine migration discourse by introducing positive vocabulary and subverting the visual language of barricade tape usually associated with exclusion.

Yousefzada was born in 1977 into a Sunni Muslim family in Birmingham. His Pakistani father was a carpenter, while his mother of Afghan heritage was a tailor running a dress-making business. He grew up in Balsall Heath, to parents who were unable to read or write in English or their mother tongue. Yousefzada studied anthropology at the SOAS University of London and did a foundation in art and design at Central Saint Martins. He also received an MPhil from Cambridge University.

== Career ==
=== Research ===
His practice is also research led. Osman is a research practitioner at the Royal College of Art researching female immigrant experiences through Material Culture. He is a Visiting Fellow at Jesus College, Cambridge. He is also a Visiting Professor of Interdisciplinary Practice at BCU Birmingham School of Art.

=== Visual arts ===
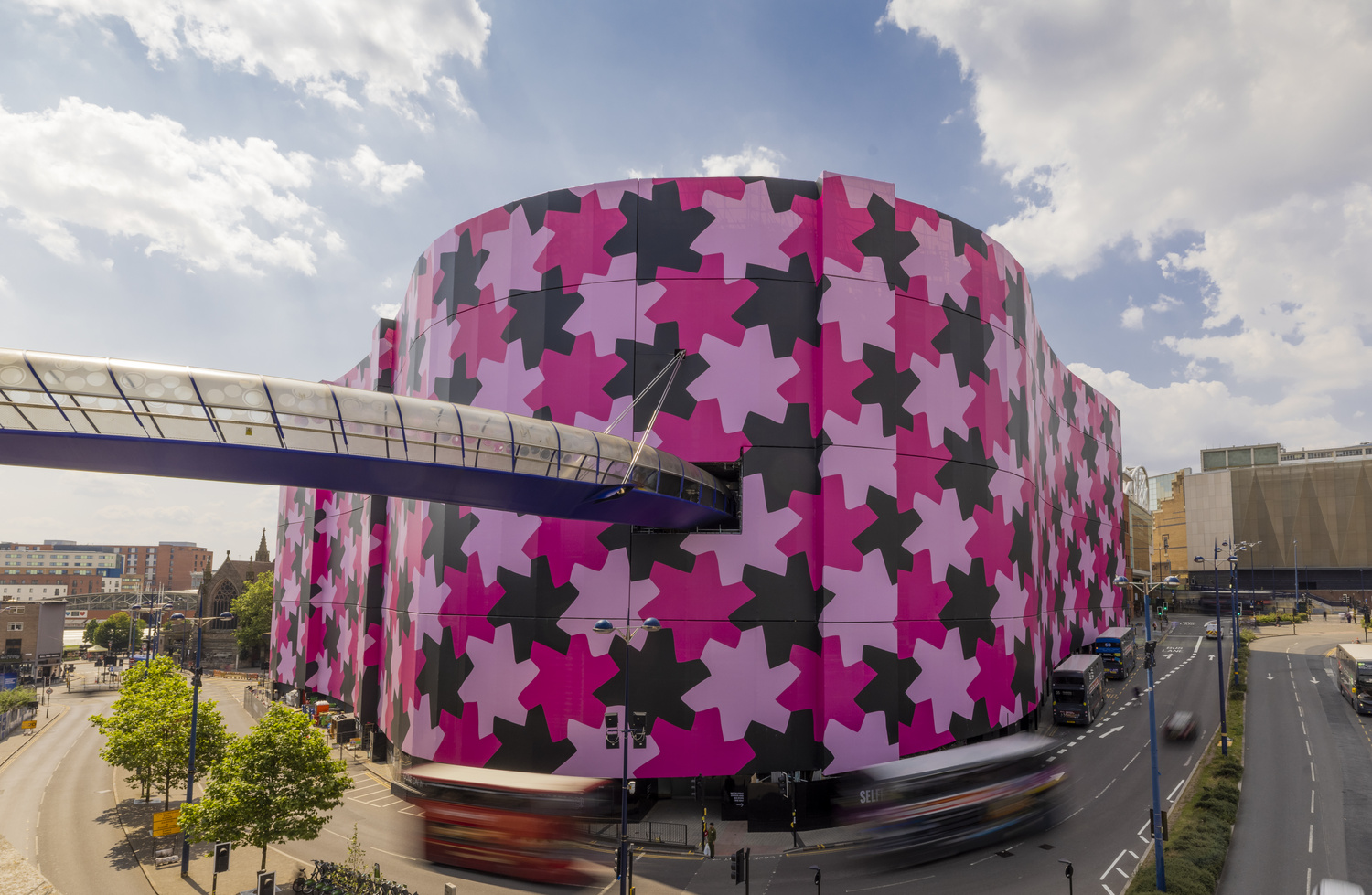
The black-pink pattern (Infinity Pattern 1) installation by Yousefzada at Selfridges Building, Birmingham

These socio-political issues are explored through mediums of moving image, installations, text works, sculpture, garment making and performance.

Infinity Pattern 1 is Yousefzada’s first piece of public art, selected by Birmingham’s Ikon Gallery from an international shortlist. The black-pink pattern is an installation at the Selfridges Birmingham store.

Yousefzada's first solo exhibition, "Being Somewhere Else", was at the critically acclaimed contemporary art space Ikon Gallery in 2018, curated by Jonathan Watkins. The exhibition was made to demonstrate the inequalities in the factory systems of mass production, as well as exploring marginalised voices and experiences within migration.

Yousefzada created a short film in 2020, named Her Dreams are Bigger about garment workers in Bangladesh which was shown at the Whitechapel Gallery in London.

Yousefzada's work was reviewed as ‘one of the show’s finest works at the White Chapel Gallery (2023). In Osman Yousefzada’s work 'An Immigrant’s Room of Her Own' (2018), there's a bedroom scene, informed by Yousefzada’s Pakistani mother’s domestic spaces, rituals and habits in Birmingham.

A chest of draws is filled with earth, a reference to the Muslim tradition of burying hair. A rope, evoking long hair, trails from a mannequin display head, around the carpeted floor of the installation, leading to a wall-based textile. It looks bodily, like an umbilical cord framing the tableau, perhaps linking it to Yousefzada’s own identity. On the floor are a bed, a tower of saucepans wrapped in clingfilm, a makeshift wardrobe and stacked laundry bags in which an immigrant’s whole life might be contained.

All around them are concealed objects, like those packages in Hiller’s work, only this time, they are sculpted ceramic vessels and candlesticks and such, wrapped in black PVC. The wrapping is an act that conceals a life, yet also protects it. Yousefzada based these items directly on his mother’s practice of swathing household objects. His work is both symbolic of the precarious nature of immigrants’ lives, but also a tender and complex portrait of a loved one and, by extension, himself.

Yousefzada's show 'Queer Feet' (2023) at Charleston house, Firle, the heart of Bloomsbury escapism, included textile compositions feature painted canvases and collaged barricade tape, Afghan, Balouch and Turkish rugs, as well as found materials that are reminiscent of the embroidery the artist’s mother, a talented maker, would stitch onto table cloths. They are overlaid with depictions of male figures found in 1950s physique magazines, rendered in the distinctive black and yellow hazard tape, representing defiant queer bodies.

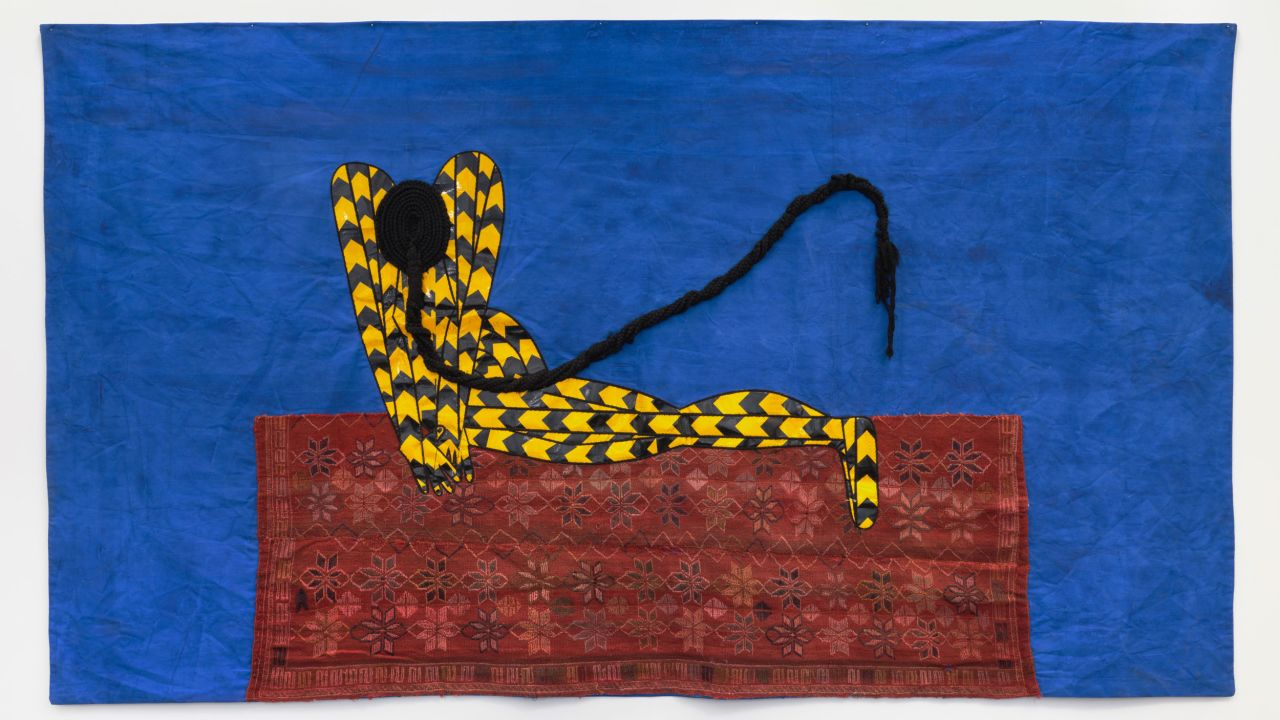
From the show ‘Queer Feet’. These textile works represent defiant queer bodies and are embroidered with found objects and Afghan rugs, reflecting Yousefzada’s own cultural heritage.

The exhibition also features a new series of studies on paper created by Yousefzada during a residency at the Birmingham School of Art. Inspired by characters in the Falnama, a book of omens used by fortune tellers in Iran, India and Turkey during the 16th and 17th centuries. People seeking insight into the future would turn to a page of the Falnama at random, and interpret the text and colourful drawings to predict their future. Depicting powerful intersex guardians, Yousefzada creates these works as talismans or magical objects that protect or heal, and act as guides through the immigrant experience.

=== Migrant Festival ===
Yousefzada also conceptualised and curated the first Migrant Festival at the Ikon gallery, inviting activists, writers, artists, creatives to bring forward voices that are not often heard. Part of Yousefzada’s practice is creating shared platforms and collaboration. The migrant festival is still a core part of the Ikon galleries programming and subsequent participants have included artists Hew Locke, Keith Piper and writer Sathnam Sanghera.

=== Writing ===
Osman has written on various themes of Race, Labour and marginalised communities. In 2022 he published a memoir, called The Go Between. The memoir gives an insight about growing up in the 80's in Birmingham, in a closed Pakistani migrant community. The book has received critical acclaim. Stephen Fry reviewed it as 'One of the greatest childhood memoirs of our time'. Hanif Kureishi has said that it was 'Poetic and moving' and The Guardian reviewed it as magic behind closed doors. The memoir was longlisted for the Polari First Book Prize in 2022 and won the Slightly Foxed prize in 2023.

=== Fashion ===
Vogue wrote ‘Yousefzada’s multidisciplinary work spans clothing, publishing, sculpture, video, and installation art, all broaching themes of inclusivity and social justice through the medium of fashion long before they became industry buzzwords’.

Yousefzada launched his eponymous label, Osman, in 2008. He earned a reputation at London's fashion weeks that year mostly by the black dresses he designed, which prompted the U.S. Vogue magazine to call him the "re-inventor of the Little Black Dress".

Within a few years of launching his label, Yousefzada had become a "fashion powerhouse". Some of his famous clients include Beyoncé, Emily Blunt and Lady Gaga. Beyoncé wore an Osman dress at the 55th Annual Grammy Awards.

In 2016 he won the Outstanding Achievement in Art & Design at the 6th Asian Awards.

Yousefzada, practice has been interdisciplinary, his first commission was by Jerwood Arts in 2005 at the Wapping Project, and his first solo exhibition at the Ikon Gallery was in 2018. The exhibition was made to demonstrate the inequalities in systems of mass production, as well as experiences with migration.

In 2019, Yousefzada opened up a temporary space in London's Floral Street which he named House of Osman.

In 2020, Ecoage said that Yousefzada ‘took the boldest stance’. That is to say, he showed no clothes. Instead he invited an audience and the press to the Whitechapel Gallery on the Sunday of fashion week and showed the short film ‘Her Dreams Are Bigger,’ about Bangladeshi garment workers response to ‘made in Bangladesh’ clothing. Turning the lens from the wearer to the maker.

Yousefzada's artistic practice and garment making have been consistently intertwined, but his current focus lies in his activism, visual art practice, writing and research.

== Exhibitions ==
=== Solo exhibitions ===
==== 2024 ====
Where It Began, Cartwright Hall Art Gallery, Bradford

==== 2023 ====
Queer Feet, Charleston, Firle

Rituals & Spells, Cromwell Place, London

==== 2022 ====
What is Seen & What is Not, Victoria & Albert Museum, London

==== 2018 ====
Being Somewhere Else, Ikon Gallery, Birmingham

=== Group exhibitions ===
==== 2023 ====
Life is more important than Art, White Chapel Gallery, London

One that Includes Myth, Goodman Gallery, London

Ventilator, Installation, Royal College of Art, London

Alea Iacta Est, Vistamare, Milan (Italy)

==== 2022 ====
Spaces of Transcendence, Sufi & Trans-gender rituals (New Commission), Museum of Contemporary Art Australia, Sydney

Glasstress, Berengo Fondazione, Venice

==== 2020 ====
'Her Dreams are Bigger', Radical Figures: Painting in the New Millennium, Whitechapel Gallery, London

Malevich Symposium: The Power of Sound 180 Strand, London

A Rich Tapestry: Curated by Jonathan Watkins & Ayesha Khalid, new commission for ‘Huis-Clos (No Exit)’ Lahore Biennale, Lahore (Pakistan)

Between the Sun and the Moon, Lahore Biennale, Lahore (Pakistan)

==== 2019 ====
Nightfall, Mendes Wood DM, Brussels (Belgium)

==== 2018 ====
Volcano Extravaganza, Fiorucci Art Trust, Stromboli (Italy)

Total Anastrophes, Dhaka Art Summit, Dhaka (Bangladesh)

The Fabric of India (toured by V&A museum), Cincinnati Art Museum, Ohio (United States)

==== 2017 ====
The Fabric of India, Ringling Museum, Florida (United States)

==== 2013 ====
The Wedding Dresses 1775-2014, V&A Museum, London

==== 2011 - 2012 ====
Reconstruction, British Council, Lahore Museum in Lahore. Central State Museum, Almaty. Georgian National Museum, Tbilisi. Style.uz, Tashkent. Bangladesh National Museum, Dhaka

==== 2008 ====
Design of the Year Awards, Design Museum, London

==== 2005 ====
Jerwood: Fashion, Film and Fiction, The Wapping Project, London

=== Public Art Installation ===
==== 2021 ====
Infinity Pattern 1, Ikon Gallery & Selfridges Birmingham

In 2020, Yousefzada created an installation putting the conversation of Migration into the heart of the city - titled Infinity Pattern 1. It is the largest public art canvas which was installed as a temporary hoarding facade at the Selfridges site in Birmingham. It remained until the end of 2022 Commonwealth Games. This was Yousefzada's first work of public art.

== Publications ==
- The Go-Between (Cannongate 2023)
- What is Seen & What is Not, (V&A 2022)
- Being Somewhere Else, (Ikon Gallery 2018)
