= The Museum of the First President of the Republic of Kazakhstan =

Coordinates: 51°10′0.0″N 71°25′8.8″E

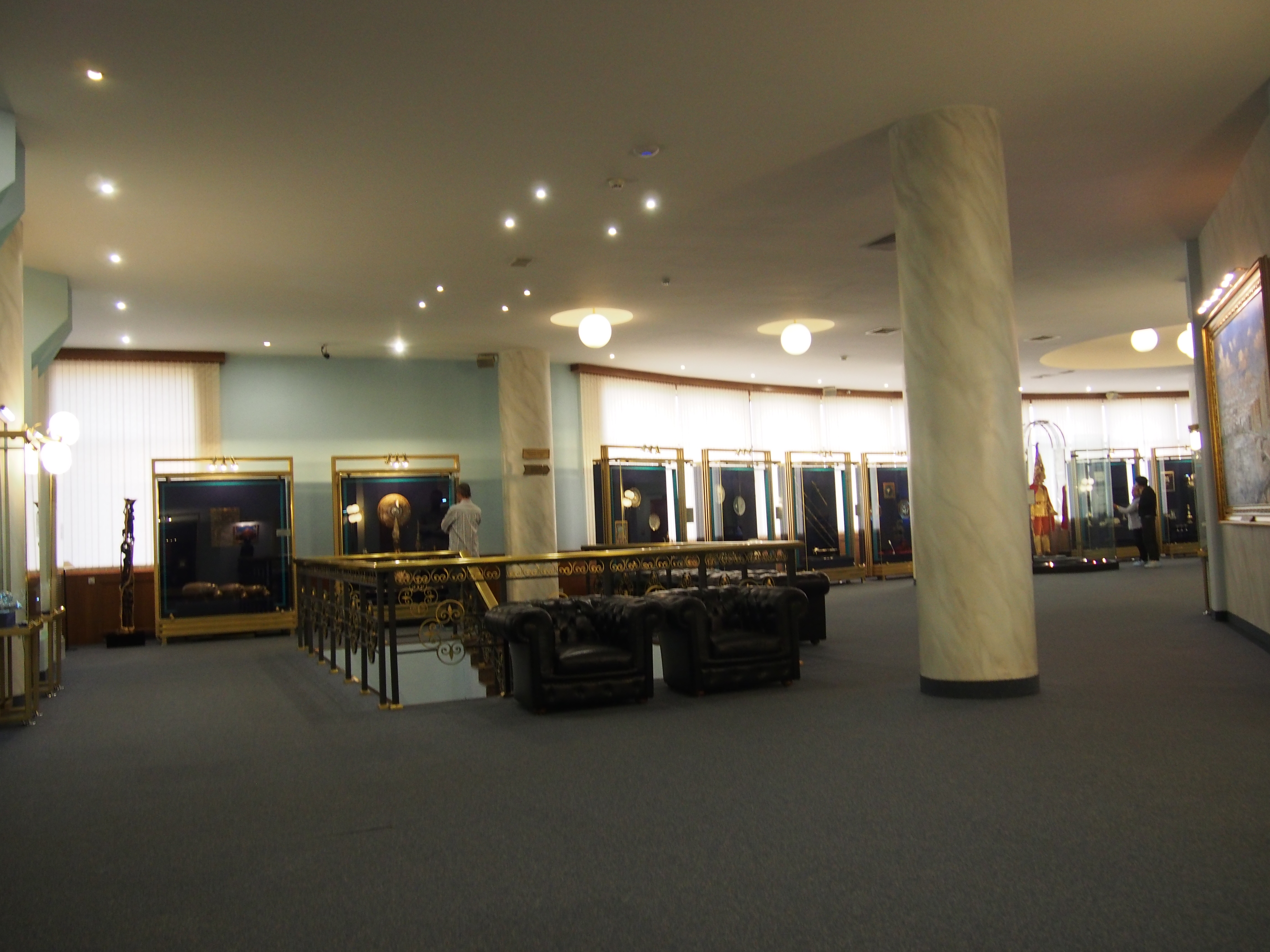
Exhibition room in the Museum of the First President of the Republic of Kazakhstan, 2017

The Museum of the First President of the Republic of Kazakhstan (Kazakh: Тұңғыш Президент мұражайы, romanized: Tūñğyş Prezident mūrajaiy) is a museum situated in Astana. It was established by Decree of the President of the Republic of Kazakhstan on August 28, 2004. It is located on 11 Beibitshilik Street, in Astana.

== Overview ==
The museum was founded on the basis of the Library of the First President of the Republic of Kazakhstan by presidential decree on November 4, 2016. The status of one of the leading divisions of the library received from that time. The museum recognizes the establishment of the state sovereignty of the Republic of Kazakhstan and the historical role of President Nursultan Nazarbayev in building an independent country as its first president. Tours of the museum are held inside the building, with tours being given in Kazakh, Russian and English. Nowadays the collection of the museum totals 37,733 units of storage, including 2,240 books and printing editions. The museum is also the former residence of the President of Kazakhstan.

== See also ==
- List of museums in Kazakhstan
- National Museum of the Republic of Kazakhstan
- Nazarbayev Center
