= A. Kasteyev State Museum of Arts =

Art museum in Almaty, Kazakhstan

Coordinates: 43.2356°N 76.9195°E

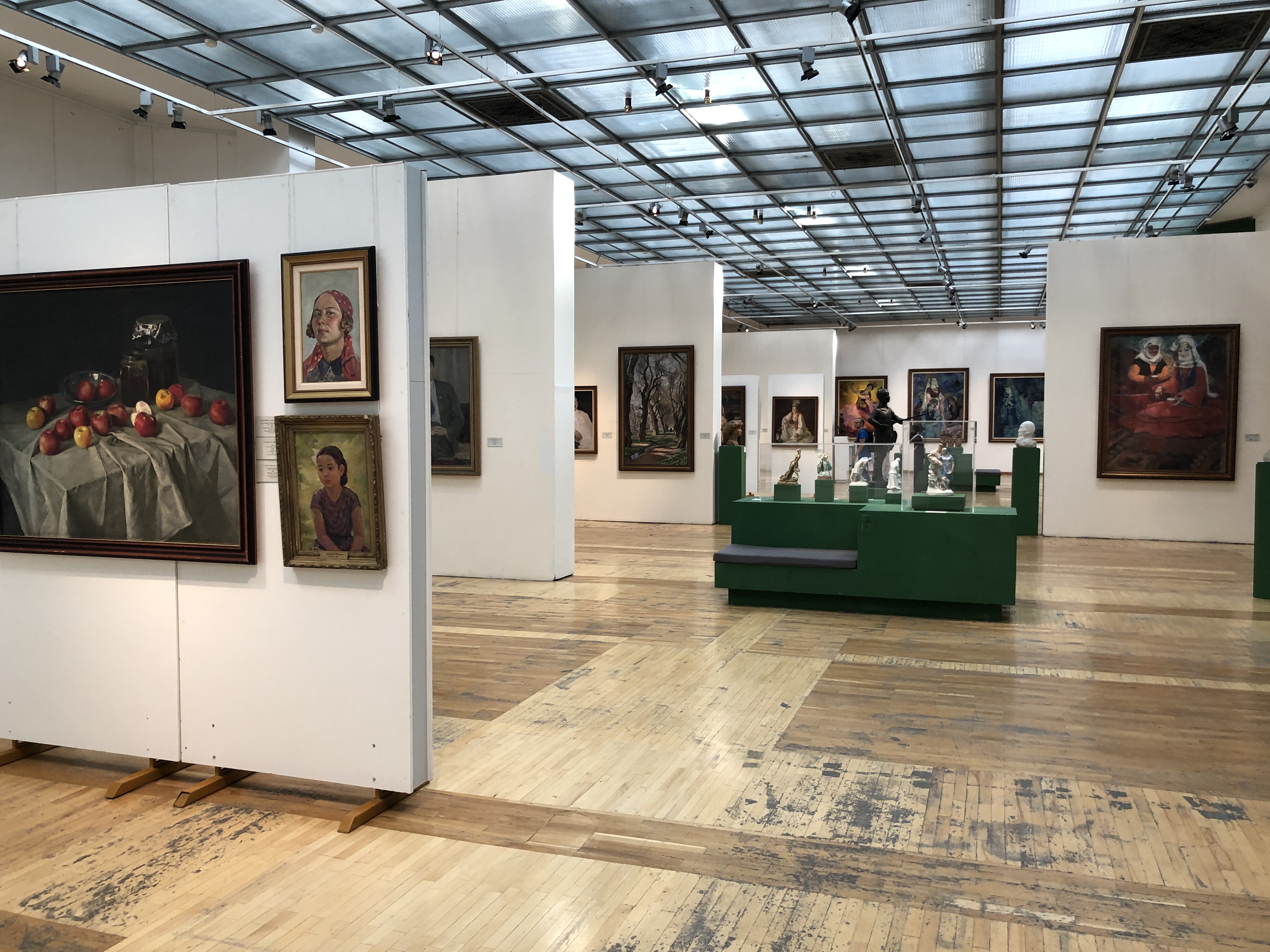
Rooms of State Museum of Arts, Almaty

The A. Kasteyev State Museum of Arts is the largest art museum in Kazakhstan, located in Almaty.

The museum opened on 16 September 1976, based on the collections of the Shevchenko Kazakh State Gallery (established in 1935) and the Republic Museum of Decorative and Applied Art (established in 1970). In 1984, the museum was renamed to honour the Kazakh artist Abilkhan Kasteev (1904–1973).

The museum has a collection of over 23,000 works, including historic and contemporary Kazakhstan art, works from the Soviet era (1920s–1990s), Russian artworks (17th to early 20th century), Western European art (16th–20th centuries), and art from East Asia (China, India, Japan, and Korea).

The Kasteyev museum is especially noted for its collection of late works of distinguished sculptor Isaac Itkind and Kazakh painting and sculpture, likely to be the largest in the world, including works by N. Nurmukhammedov, M. Kim, K. Yeserkeyev, K. Mullashev, T. Abuov and Y. Tolepbai.

== History ==
In 1935, an exhibition called "The 15th anniversary of the formation of the Kazakh SSR" was organized by the Kazakh State Art Gallery (since 1935, named after TG Shevchenko). The gallery carried out work on the collection of works by Kazakh, Russian and foreign artists.

In 1970, the Museum of Folk Applied Art of Kazakhstan was organized, which collected, preserved, studied and promoted the products of Kazakh folk arts and crafts.

In 1976, the State Museum of Arts of the Kazakh SSR was established on the basis of the collections of the Kazakh State Art Gallery named after TG Shevchenko and the Museum of Applied Folk Art of Kazakhstan. Since the same year is located in a modern building (architect G. Novikov).

In 1982 the building of the museum was included in the list of historical and cultural monuments of the Kazakh SSR of republican significance and taken under state protection.

In 1984, the museum was named after the Kazakh artist, the founder of the Kazakh national school of painting Abilkhan (Abylkhana) Kasteev.

== Selected works ==
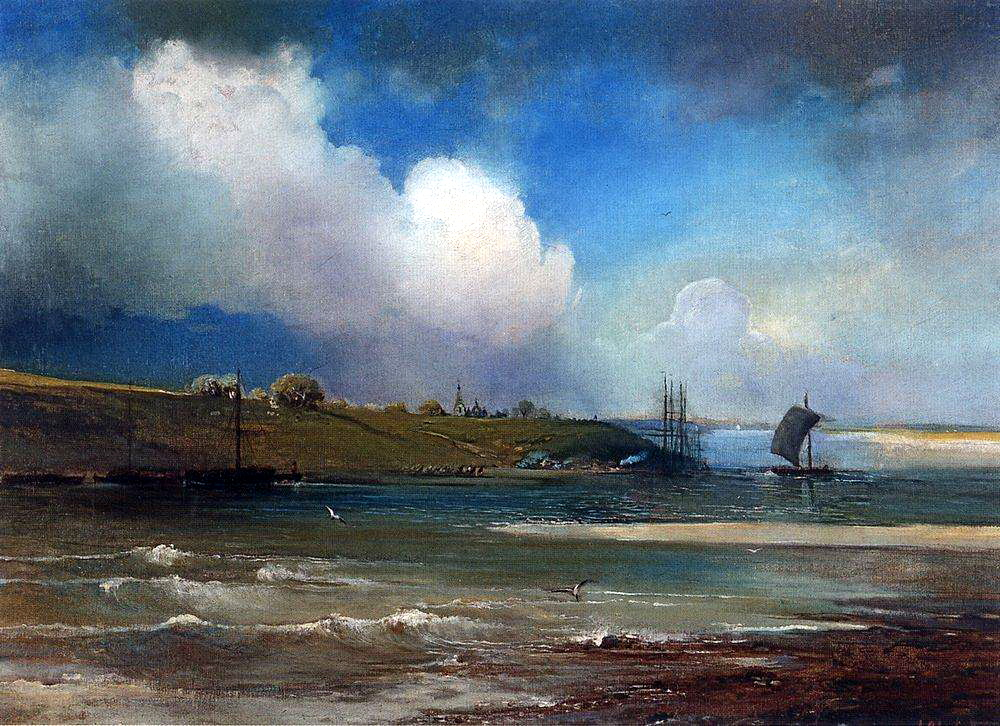
Alexei Savrasov. View of the Volga near Yuryevets, 1870s

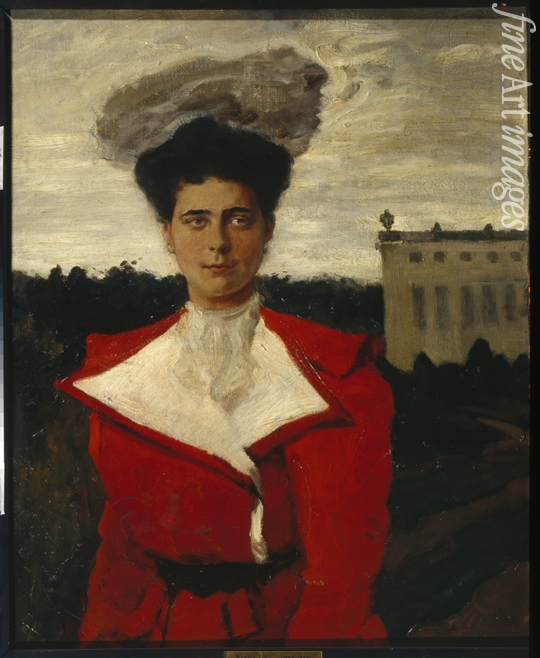
Léon Bakst. Elena Vladimirovna, 1899

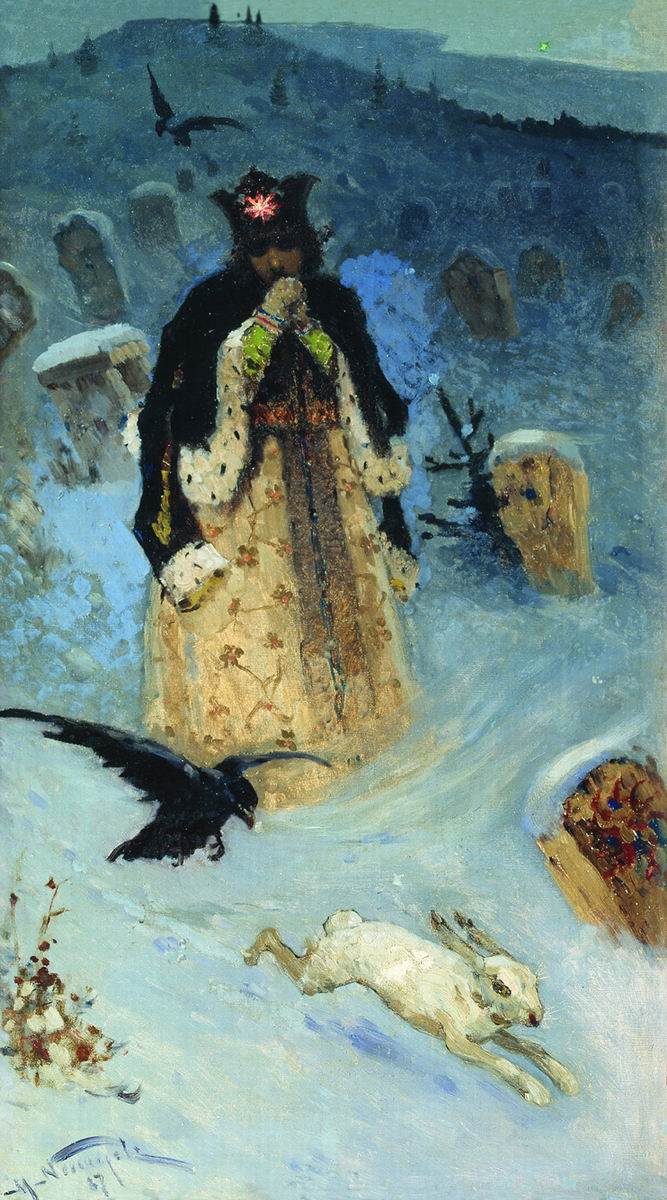
Mikhail Nesterov. Tsarevna, 1887

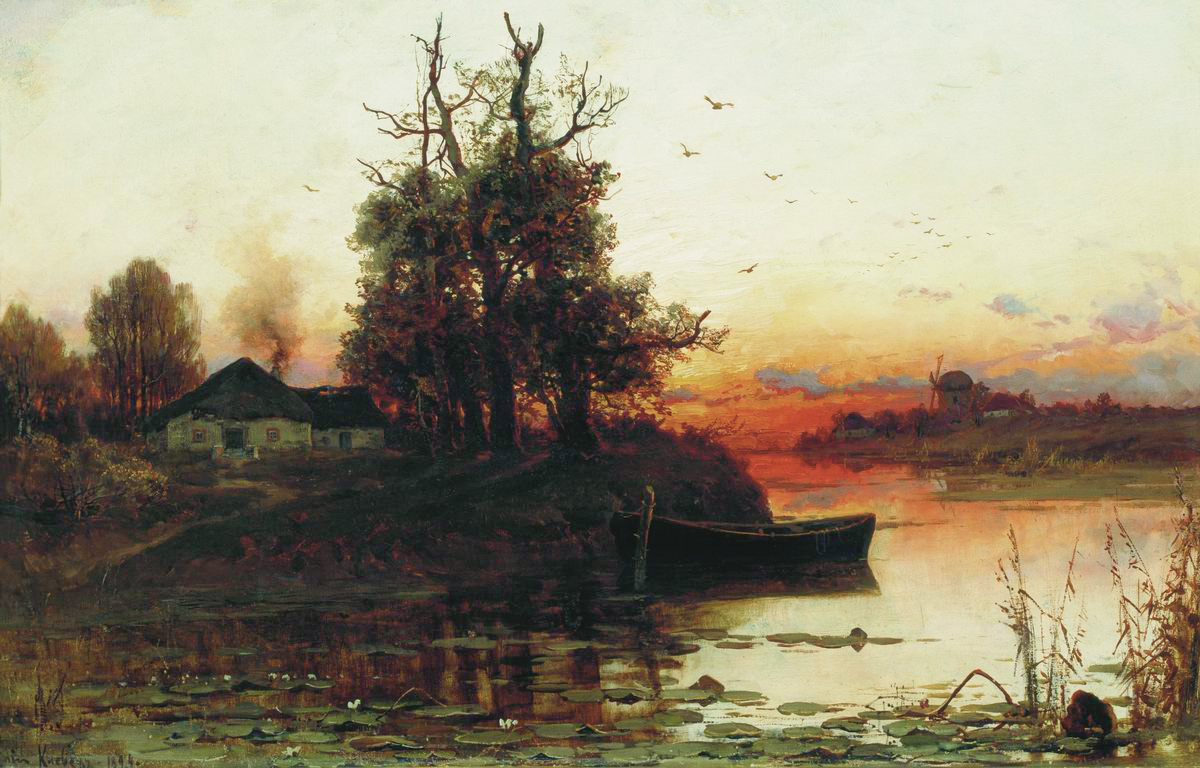
Julius von Klever. Calm of the Evening, 1894

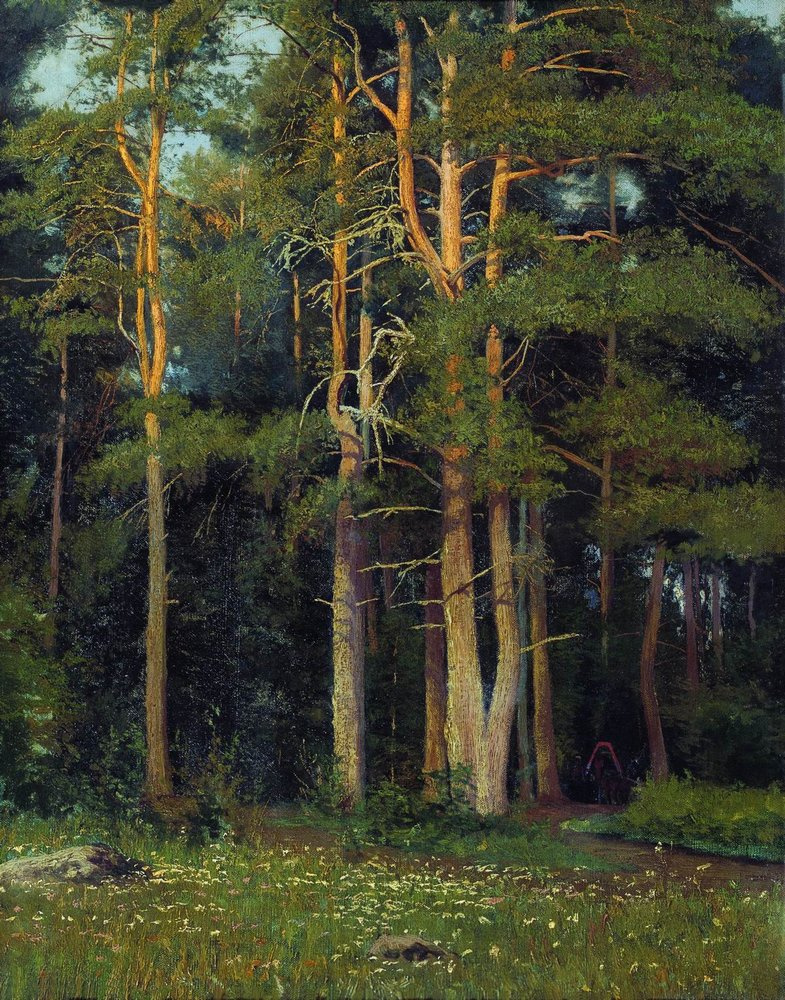
Ivan Shishkin. Pine forest at Ligov’s, 1895
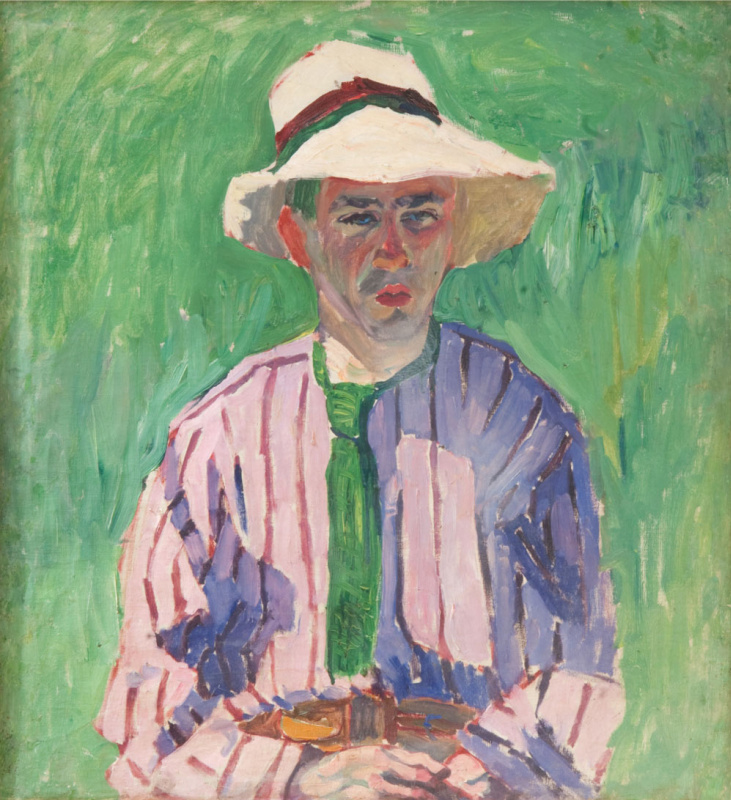
Aristarkh Lentulov. Portrait of a young man in a Panama hat, 1910

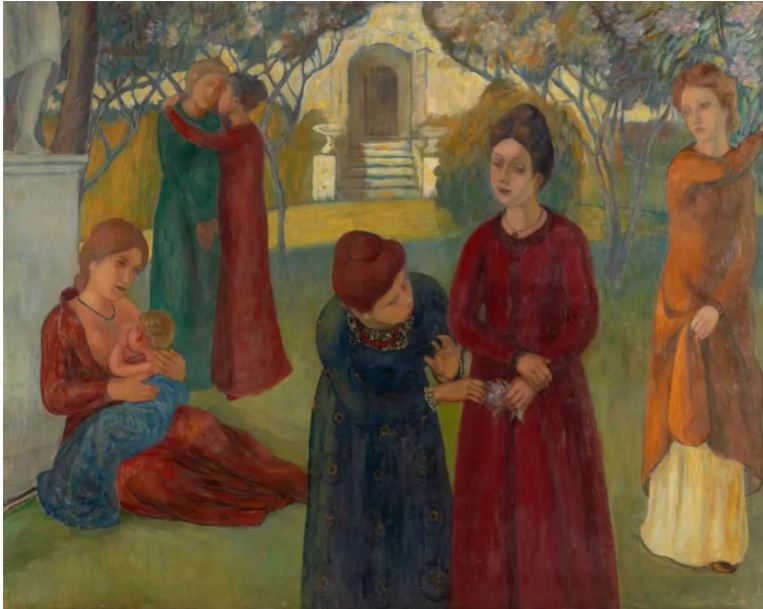
Kuzma Petrov-Vodkin. Language of flowers, 1910

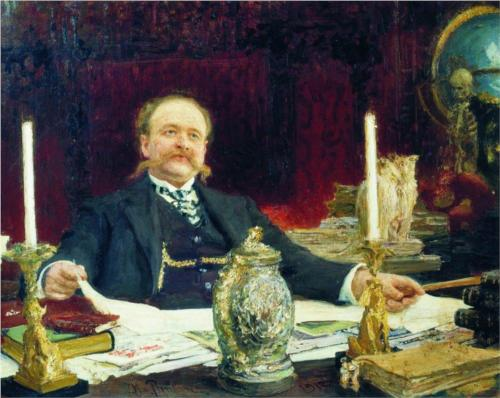
Ilya Repin. Wilhelm Bitner Portrait, 1912

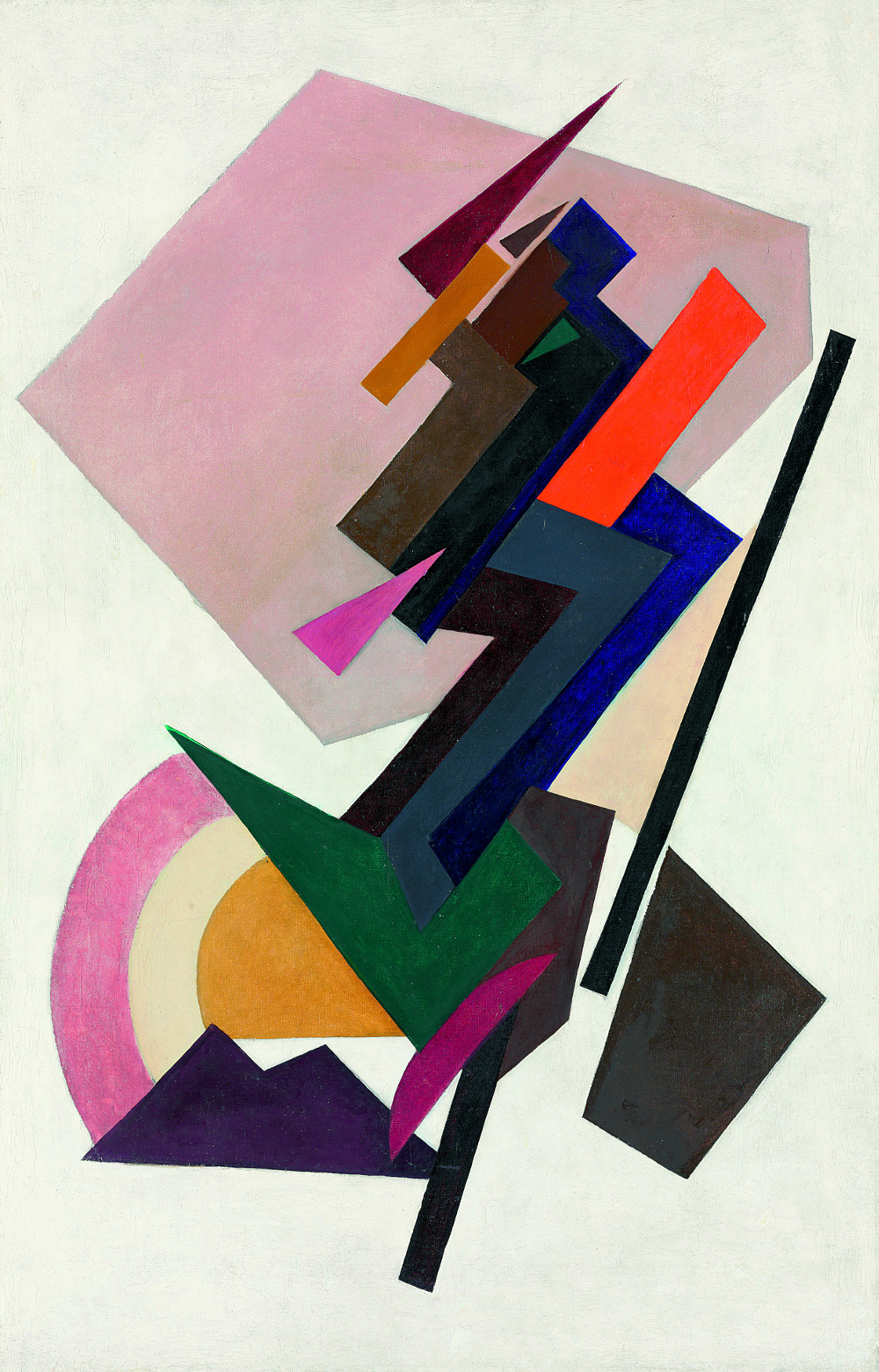
Olga Rozanova. Suprematizm, 1916

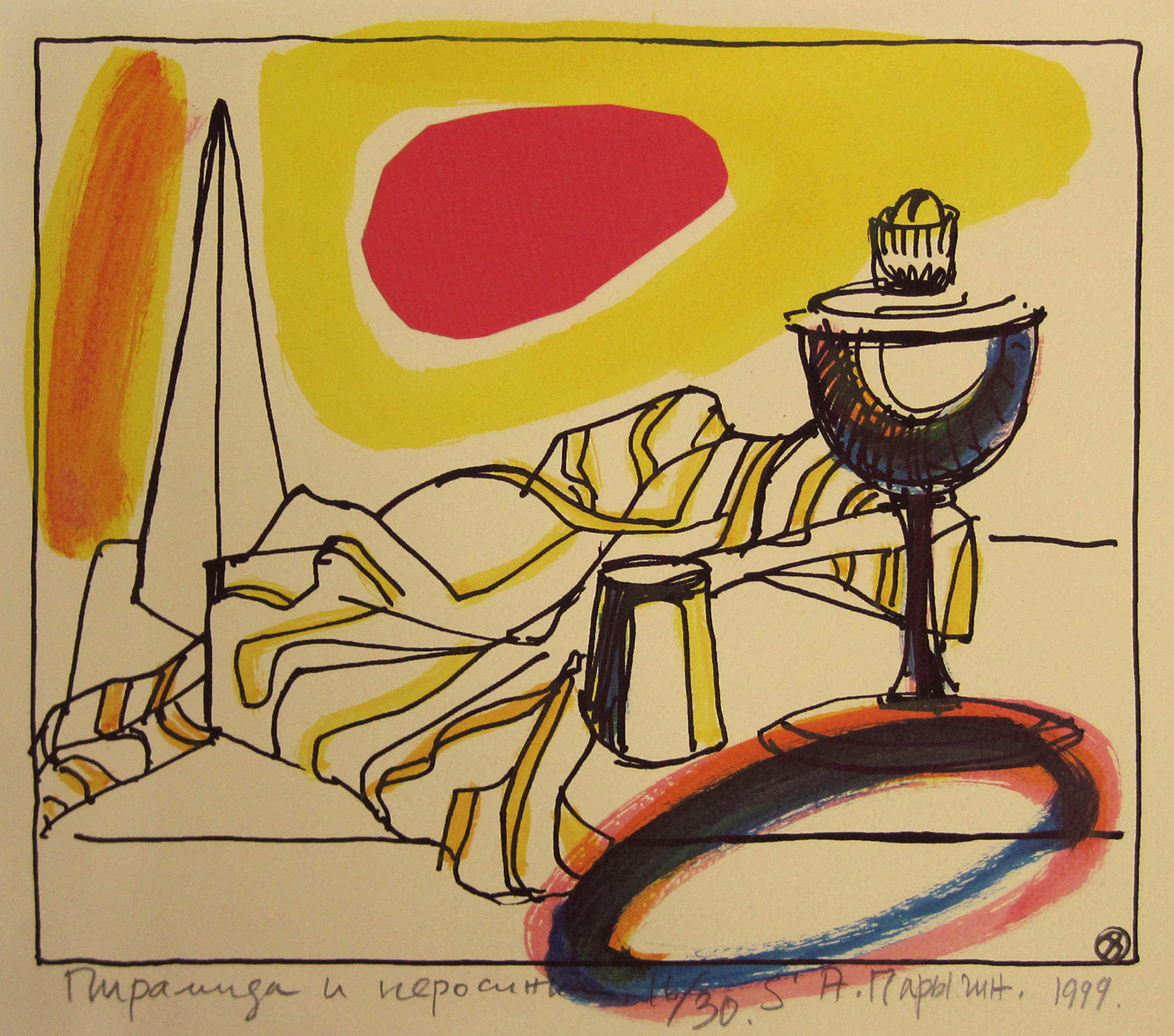
Alexey Parygin. Pyramid and Kerosene Lamp, 1999

== See also ==
- List of museums in Kazakhstan
- National Museum of the Republic of Kazakhstan
