= Tlendiyev Memorial Museum =

Coordinates: 43°14′36″N 76°56′56″E

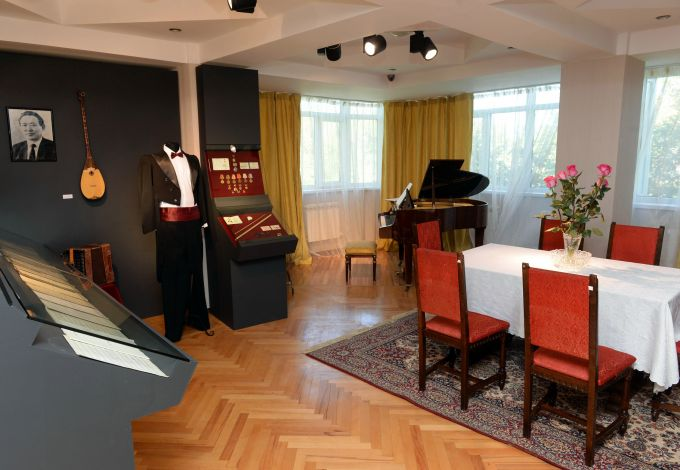
- Established: 2014
- Location: 96 Qonaev Street, Almaty, Kazakhstan
- Type: Memorial museum

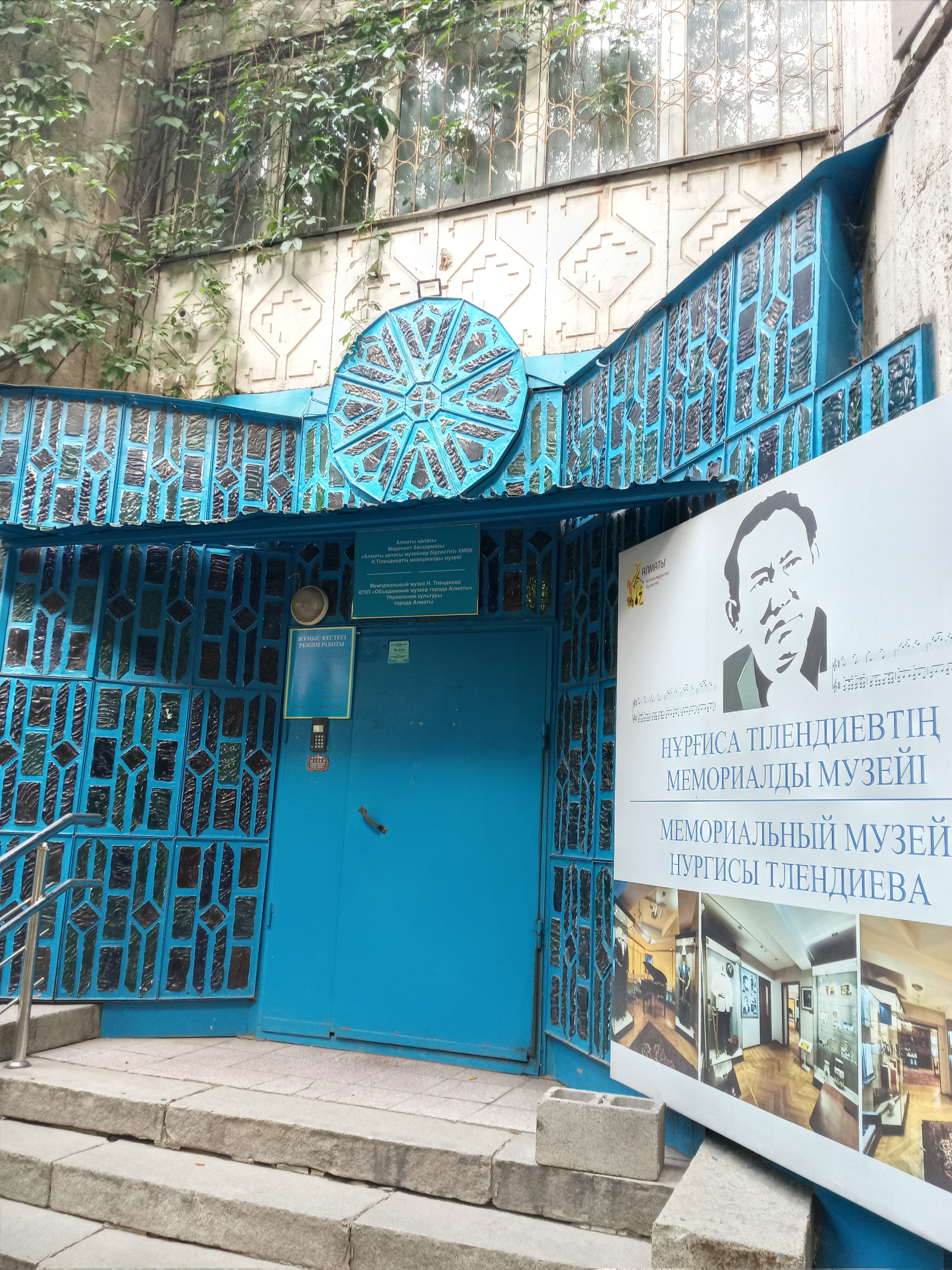
Entrance door to the Museum

Nurgisa Tlendiev Memorial Museum (Russian: Мемориальный музей Тлендиева, Kazakh: Нұрғиса Тілендиевтің мемориалды музейі) is a museum dedicated to the composer, Hero of Kazakhstan, and People's Artist of the USSR Nurgisa Tlendiyev, which is located in Almaty, Kazakhstan.

== History ==
The museum was opened on the eve of Tlendiyev's 90th anniversary, and on the eve of International Museum Day in 2014. The museum is located in the historic center of the city, in a residential building, where the composer and his family lived for the last years of his life. The opening of the museum complex was attended by former akim of Almaty, Akhmetzhan Yessimov. The total area of the memorial museum is 169 square meters.

The house where museum is located was built in 1979 on the special order of First Secretary of the Communist Party of Kazakhstan Dinmukhamed Kunaev. The museum is part of the museum association of Almaty (including the Almaty Museum, the Kazakh Museum of Folk Musical Instruments, the Kunaev Home Museum, and the Mukanov and Musrepov Museum) and promotes Tlendiev's musical work.

== Museum exposition ==
The museum displays handwritten scores, an antique grand piano and stringed musical instrument "Dariga dombyra", which was an inspiration in Tlendiev's work. The main assets of museum-apartment are items used by composer during his lifetime. A trunk, a table on which he wrote his works, photographs of family members and others are preserved in the museum. It also displays his childhood belongings and ethnographic objects of the Kazakh people.

The apartment has been preserved and recreated as it was Tlendiev's lifetime. The museum has four rooms, with the displays arranged in chronological order - the entrance hall - childhood and adolescence, living room – creations and acquaintances, work hall – musical heritage, kitchen and recreation room – photos of family, gifts and souvenirs.
