= Central State Museum of Kazakhstan =

Museum in Almaty, Kazakhstan

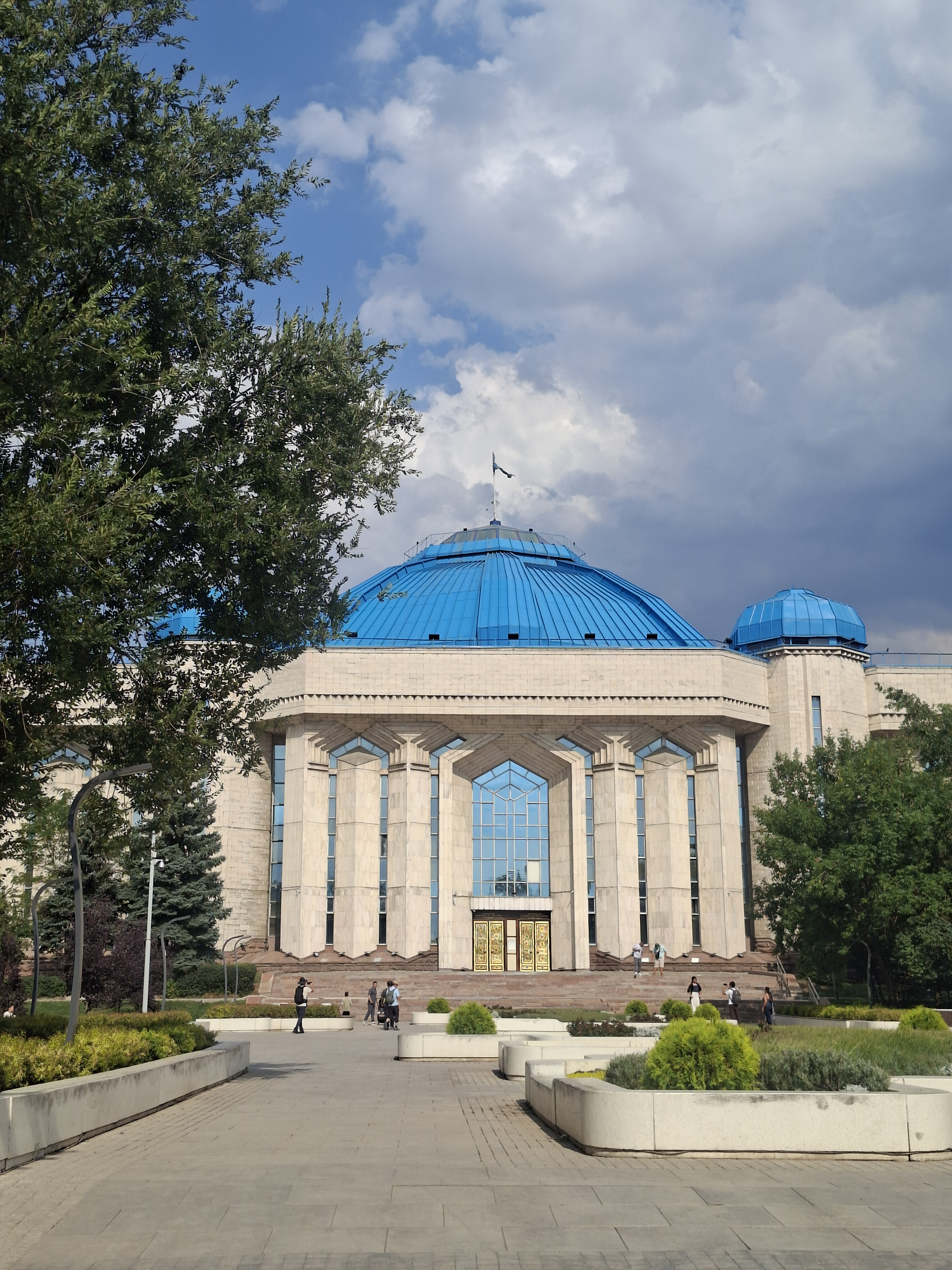
- View of the museum.
- Established: 1931
- Location: Almaty, Kazakhstan
- Coordinates: 43°14′09″N 76°57′03″E

The Central State Museum of Kazakhstan (Kazakh: Қазақстан Республикасы Мемлекеттік орталық музейі, romanized: Qazaqstan Respublikasy Memlekettık ortalyq muzeiı) is the largest museum in Almaty, Kazakhstan, and one of the largest museums in Central Asia.

When first established in 1931, the museum was located in the Almaty Cathedral. It moved to a modern facility in 1985 and is a landmark in Almaty.

The museum houses the most significant collection of Kazakh historical, archaeological, and modern cultural and political artifacts.

== History ==
In 1920, according to the decree of the Kazakh government, the Kazakh Central Regional Museum was established. At that time the collection of the Orenburg Governor's Museum was partially transferred to the educational Central Regional Museum.

Following the transfer of the Central Regional Museum to Almaty in 1929, the Kazakh Central Regional Museum was dissolved.

In the 1930s, the Neplyuev Military School in Orenburg was organized as the "Museum of the Orenburg Territory". Later the collection of the Museum of the Orenburg region and the collection of the Zhetysuysky (Semirechensk) regional museum were included in the museum fund.

In 1931 the museum was located in the building of the former cathedral in Almaty. In 1941 the collection of the Republican antireligious museum was included in the fund.

In 1985, a modern building was built, which now houses the Central State Museum of Kazakhstan. The museum complex includes the largest restoration center in Kazakhstan, which works to restore works of art.

In 2005, the museum received the official status of a research organization, which gives an opportunity to conduct historical expeditions and expand the scope of the organization's activities. Since 2006, the museum has participated in the international event "Night of Museums".

In 2015, there was an initiative to change the museum's activities into a Cultural Center, which should include a change in the exposition. The proposal was related to the possible transition of the museum from state to municipal ownership.

== Exhibition halls ==
- Hall of paleontology and archeology
- Hall of historical ethnography
- History and ethnography of the people living in Kazakhstan
- Modern Kazakhstan
- Open fund
- Anthropology Museum
- Hall of Nikolai Gavrilovich Khludov

== Museum building ==
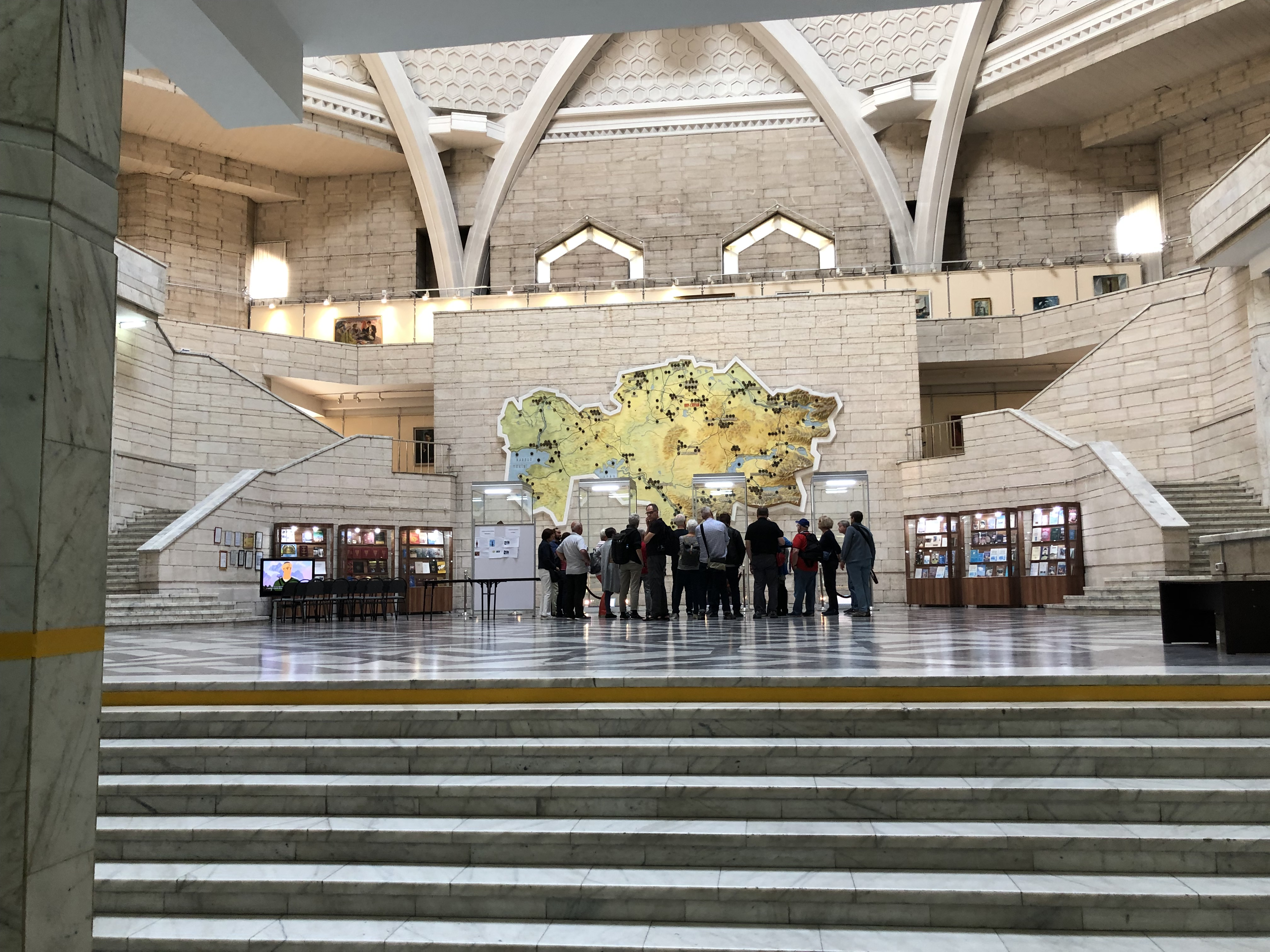
Museum interior

The museum building was built from 1978 to 1985. Before that, the museum was located in the Holy Ascension Cathedral.

It was established by order of the Almaty City Executive Committee by the organization "Glavalmaatastroy". The designer of the project was GPI "Kazgorstroyproekt". The head of the architectural team was Yu.G. Ratushny. The author of the project was Z.M. Mustafina in cooperation with B.A. Rzagaliev, B.I. Nikishina, V.I. Slusareva and others.

The rectangular in plan three-story building rests on a "stylobate" formed by the natural terrain. Volumetric and spatial characteristics of the building is based on the use of stylistic techniques of the Kazakh architecture. The frame of the building is designed on a frame system of eight external supports, pylons. The facades are designed in a single rhythmic system of pilasters which unite the three stories. The compositional center of the building is a two-story lobby, flanked by the exhibition halls. Colored metal, marble, parquet, shell rock and granite are used in the interior of the museum.

== Exhibitions ==
The museum organizes numerous temporary exhibitions. In 2026, it presented “Architecture of Three Generations,” dedicated to the 90th anniversary of the Union of Architects of the Republic of Kazakhstan, as well as “The Phenomenon of Uzbekali Zhanibekov: History, Culture and National Consciousness,” dedicated to the 95th anniversary of Uzbekali Zhanibekov.

In April 2026, it presented the exhibition “Under the Sky,” an open dialogue between art, space, and the horizon, featuring artists such as Rashid bin Khalifa Al Khalifa from Bahrain; Ahmed Al Maghlouth and Jamelah Alherz from Saudi Arabia; Kaltham Belselah (UAE); Farhan Al Sheikh Al Sayed from Qatar; Daniel Garbade from Spain; Mohannad Al-Daoud from Iraq; Christine El Ojeil from Lebanon; Yashiro Hiroyuki from Japan; and Maram Hasan from Jordan, along with artists from other countries such as the United Kingdom, Poland, Austria, and Armenia. The exhibition was organized by Britrise Ltd and presented by Raisa Ambros.

== See also ==
- List of museums in Kazakhstan
- National Museum of the Republic of Kazakhstan
