= Kasteev Home Museum =

Museum in Kazakhstan

- Дом музей Кастеева
- Established: 2014
- Location: Almaty
- Coordinates: 43°14′36″N 76°56′56″E

Home Museum of Abylkhan Kasteev (Kazakh: Әбілхан Қастеев мұражай-үйі, romanized: Äbılhan Qasteev mūrajai-üiı, Russian: Дом музей Кастеева, tr. dom muzei kasteeva) is a memorial museum of the painter Abilkhan Kasteev in Almaty, Kazakhstan. The museum is located in the house where he lived from 1958 to 1973.

== History ==
The house is located on Bekhozhina Street in the east part of Almaty, behind the Malaya Almatinka river. It was built in 1955 for the artist's family. In 1966 the house was completely demolished and then rebuilt. Abilkhan Kasteev lived and worked in the house from 1958 to 1973.

In 2004, Kasteev's family transferred the house to the state to create a memorial museum.

In 2014, the 110th anniversary of the artist's birth, the memorial home-museum was opened. The opening ceremony of the museum was attended by the artist's family, friends, employees of the A. Kasteyev State Museum of Arts and the akim (mayor) of Medeu District, Sultanbek Makezhanov.

== Museum building ==
The building is a one-storey house of mid-twentieth century, built by decree of the Chairman of the Council of Ministers of the Kazakh Soviet Socialist Republic Dinmukhamed Kunaev in 1955 specifically for Kasteev's large family. In 1958 the artist and his family moved into the house. In 1966 the former house was completely demolished and in its place was built another house with improved planning. In 1968 a studio, where A. Kasteev worked, was added. The house was built according to the design of chief architect of Almaty N. Orazymbetov. The house with a total area of 142.5 sq.m. has been preserved in its original form: a living room, three bedrooms, a workshop, a kitchen, a bathroom, a veranda.

== Museum exposition ==
The museum exhibition introduces the most famous paintings and drawings created by A. Kasteev. The artist's paintings in museum are represented by copies. On display are Portrait of Amangeldy, Turksib, Talas River and Portrait of Kenesary. The collection also includes rich historical and biographical material - photographs, documents, newsreels and personal belongings of the artist.
