= Abilkhan Kasteev =

Kazakh painter (1904–1973)

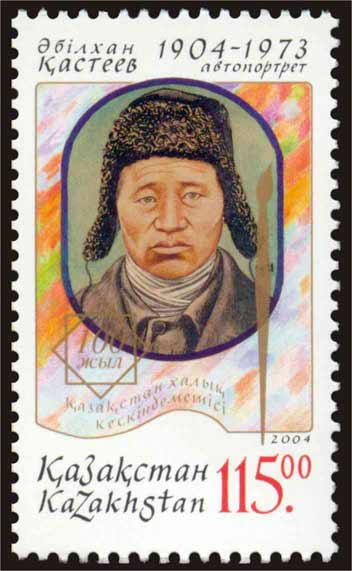
Self-portrait of Abylkhan Kasteyev on a Kazakhstani stamp, 2004.

Abilkhan Kasteev (Kazakh: Әбілхан Қастеев, Äbılhan Qasteev; January 14, 1904 – November 2, 1973) was a Soviet and Kazakhstani painter. He was highly decorated, being awarded the title of National Artist of the Kazakh SSR, and was a Laureate of the Shoqan Walikhanov State Prize of the Kazakh SSR. He was awarded the Order of the October Revolution, and two Orders of the Red Banner of Labour.

Kasteev was born in a small village in Taldykorgan Region and studied at the Nadezhda Krupskaya art studio in Almaty. He painted more than a thousand paintings in oil and water-colours. Some of his works are on display in the State Tretyakov Gallery, in the State Museum of East Nations Art, in the Central Museum of USSR Revolution by Lenin Order in Moscow, and in the State Museum of Fine Arts of Kazakhstan (which was renamed after Kasteev), and in the other museums of the country.

== See also ==
- Kasteev Home Museum
