= Museum of Archaeology (Kazakhstan) =

Archaeological museum in Kazakhstan

Coordinates: 43°14′36″N 76°56′56″E

- Археология мұражайы (Kazakh); Arxeologïya murajayı (Kazakh); Музей археологии (Russian)
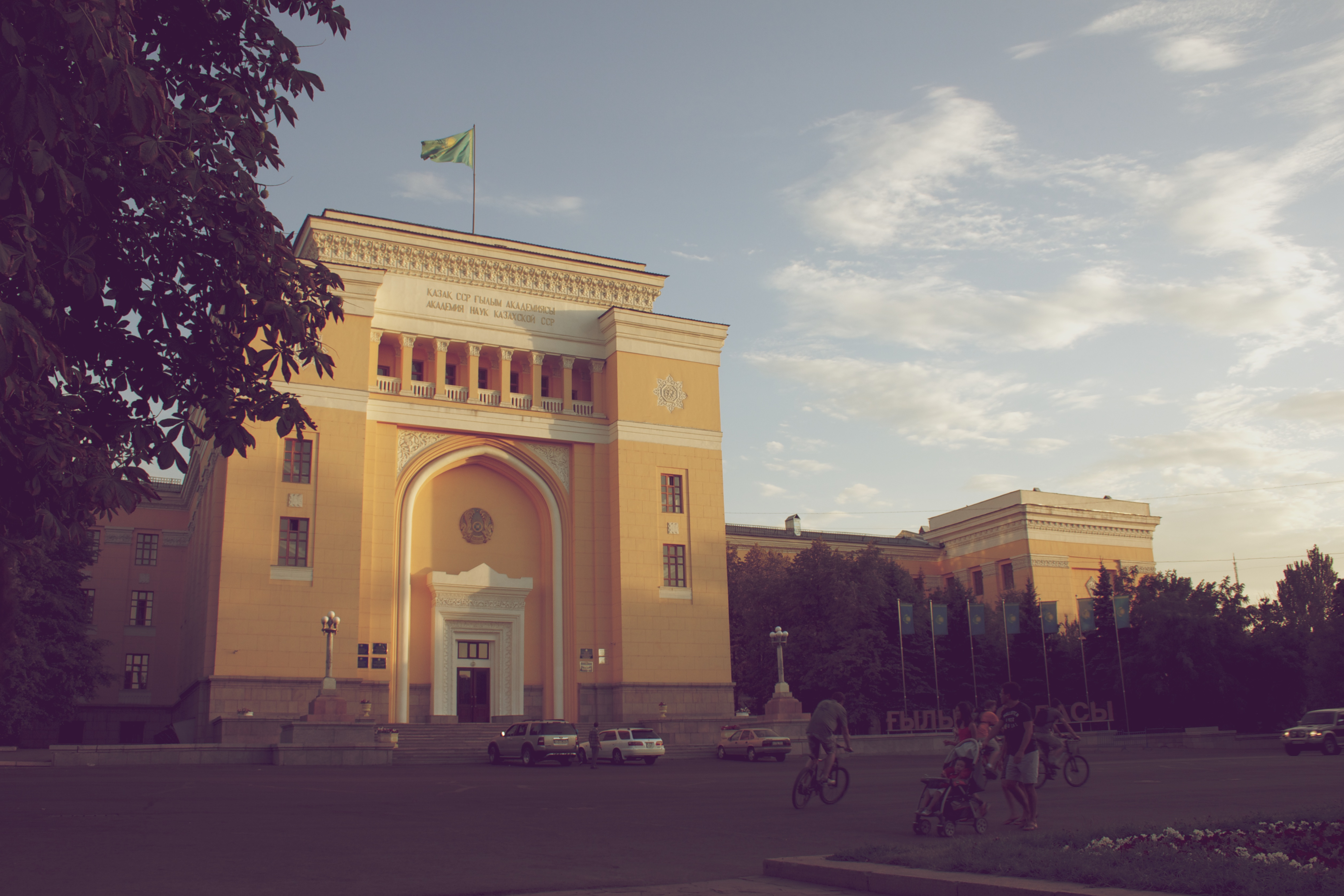
- Established: 1973
- Location: Almaty
- Website: www.gylymordasy.kz

The Museum of Archaeology (Kazakh: Археология мұражайы, Arxeologïya murajayı; Russian: Музей археологии, romanized: Muzey arkheologii) is an archaeological museum located in the Ğılım ordası complex of the National Academy of Sciences of Kazakhstan in Almaty, Kazakhstan.

== History ==
The creation of the museum is connected with the work of several generations of Kazak scientists beginning in the 1920s, and the development of Kazak archeological science. Longstanding research by Kazakh scientists across the country resulted in the discovery of rich and often unique material from the ancient and medieval history of Kazakhstan. The museum opened in 1973 at the initiative of the First Secretary of the Communist Party of Kazakhstan Dinmukhamed Kunaev. The museum was created with the participation of Kazakh scientists: Alkey Margulan, Akay Nusupbekov, K. A. Akishev, H. A. Alpysbaev, M. K. Kadyrbaev, A. G. Maksimova, and K. A. Baypakov, for the purposes of national heritage conservation and research work.

In 2012, the museum reopened after restoration, as part of the Gylym Ordasy complex at a new location, the building of the Academy of Sciences of Kazakhstan.

== Exhibition ==
In 1946, Alkey Margulan became the organizer and the head of the Central Kazakhstan archaeological expedition, which discovered the largest deposits of finds from the late Bronze Age Begazy–Dandybai culture in Kazakhstan. Findings of this expedition became the main part of the display during the opening of the museum in 1973.

The Museum of Archaeology continues to work on acquiring artefacts, accepting findings of archaeologists from across the country. The museum developed a scientific exhibition, covering the ancient history of Kazakhstan from the Stone Age to the Middle Ages. Of particular value is the reconstruction of the burial chamber of mound number 11 of the Altai Berel.
