= Wilhelm Bitner =

Russian science writer (1865-1921)

Wilhelm Wilhelmovich Bitner
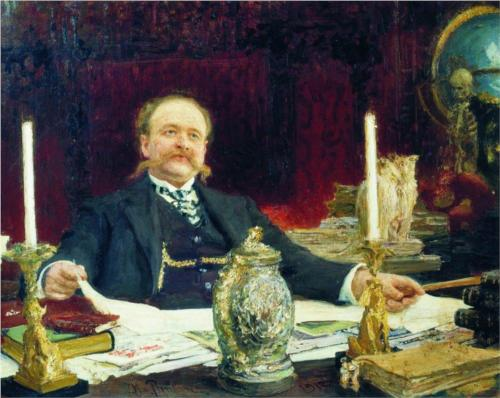
- Portrait by Ilya Repin

Wilhelm Wilhelmovich Bitner (Russian: Вильге́льм Вильге́льмович Би́тнер, styled V. V. Bitner in English, 1865–1921) was a Russian publisher, editor, bookseller, and populizer of science.

== Biography ==
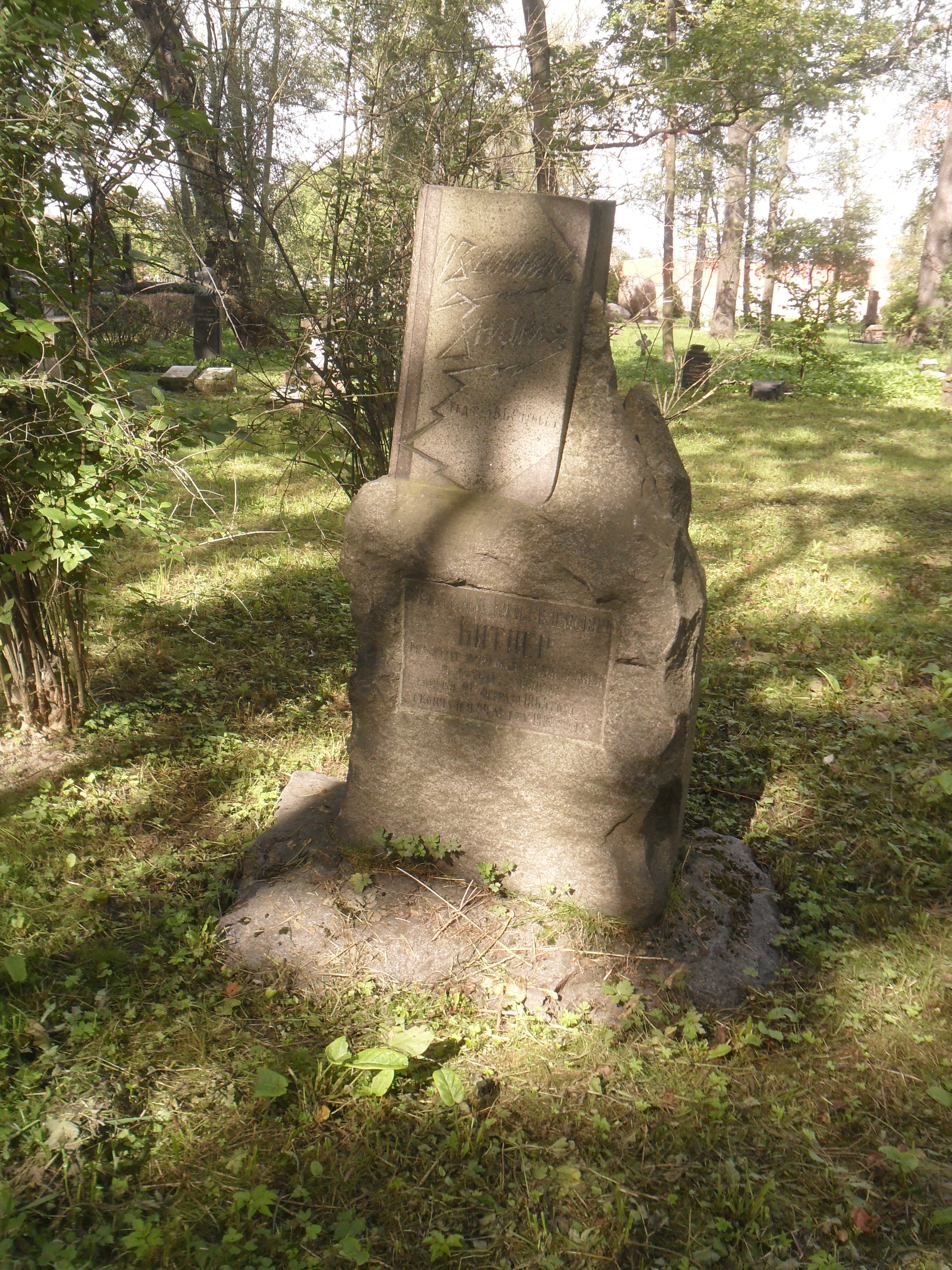
Bitner's grave in the Literary Bridges (Literatorskie mostki), Volkovo Cemetery, Saint Petersburg

Bitner was born on 21 February (5 March) 1865 in Kovno. After graduating from the Pskov military gymnasium, he served in the artillery in Bobruisk. At this time, he became interested in the natural sciences, independently studied chemistry, biology, medicine and meteorology, and subsequently for his merits in the study of the climate of Russia, he was approved by the Academy of Sciences as a correspondent of the Nikolaev Main Physical Observatory. He wrote in the genre of scientific fiction. He was a regular contributor to the journals Nature and People and Scientific Review. Bitner is the author of At the Turn of the Century (1901-1903) (Vol. 1 and Vol. 2), a review of the scientific achievements of the 19th century.

Assigned to the Ministry of Agriculture and State Property, the staff captain of the artillery reserve V. V. Bitner on 14 January 1902, applied to the Main Directorate for Press Affairs with a request to publish in St. Petersburg the periodical organ People's University; On 16 August 1902, the program of the magazine with the changed name Bulletin of Knowledge was approved by the Minister of the Interior V. K. Plehve. The journal has been published since 1903 with book supplements, published in series of 12 issues per year each: "Public University", "Encyclopedic Library", "Library of Systematic Knowledge", "People's University", "Library of Encyclopedic Knowledge", etc. Edited by V V. Bitner in 1907-1911 published the Desktop Illustrated Encyclopedia.

Korney Chukovsky called Bitner a "dark enlightener".

Bitner died in Petrograd on 24 March 1921. He was buried at the Literary Bridges of the Volkovo Cemetery, Saint Petersburg.

His daughter, literary critic Gali Vilgelmovna Ermakova-Bitner, is an employee of the Pushkin House.
