= Leyla Mahat =

Artist, curator, gallery director and associate professor

Leyla Bolatkyzy Mahat (Kazakh: Лейла Болатқызы Махат, Leyla Bolatqyzy Mahat) is an artist, curator, gallery director and an associate professor of the Faculty of Painting and Sculpture at Kazakh National University of Arts. PhD Philosophy of fine arts. The Chairperson of Curatorial board at Contemporary Art Center «Kulanshi». President of the Eurasian Academy of Arts.

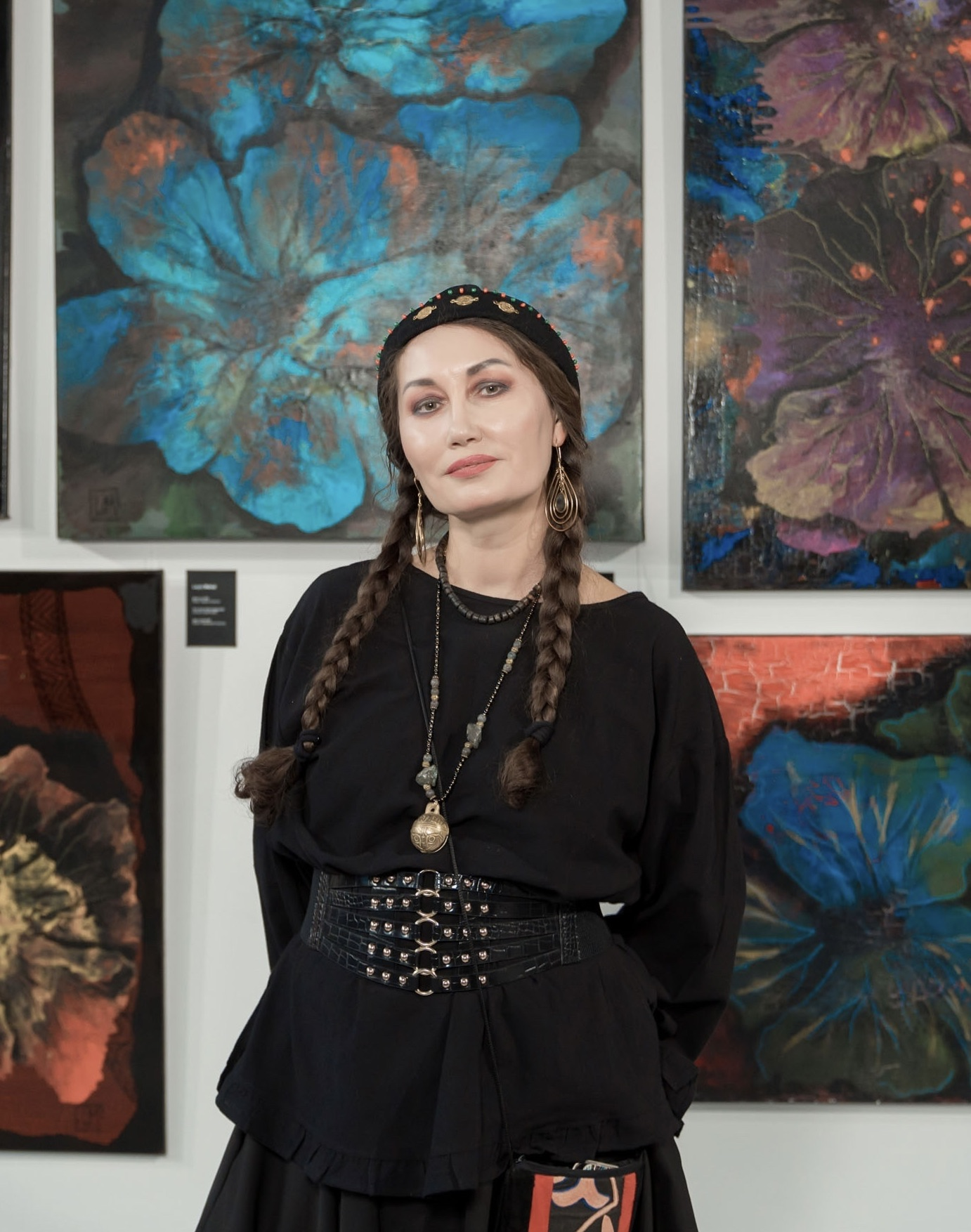
Leyla Mahat

== Awards ==
- State Award «20 years of Independence» for contribution to the art, Astana, Kazakhstan
- Franz Kafka Medal for contribution to art, Czech Republic.
- Diploma of Asia-Pacific Association of Artists, Tokyo, Japan
- Interparliamentary Assembly of the Commonwealth of Independent States award for contribution to art, St. Petersburg
- Honored Member of the Academy of Art, Prague, Czech Republic
- Laureate of the European Art Union
- Merit Award «Golden Europea» and «European platter», Prague, Czech Republic

Dr.Leyla Mahat is an author and curator of Kazakh and international projects. The artist's exhibitions were held at museums and galleries in Kazakhstan, Russia, United States of America, Italy, Czech Republic, Slovakia, Japan, China, Bangladesh, India, Netherlands, Austria, Germany, Moldova, Turkey, Slovenia, Latvia and Romania.

== Paintings in public collections of ==
- State Museum of Arts n.a A.Kasteyev, Almaty, Kazakhstan
- National museum of Republic of Kazakhstan, Astana
- Museum of the First President of Republic of Kazakhstan, Astana, Kazakhstan
- Museum of Fine Arts of the Ministry of Culture, Ankara, Turkey
- Historical Municipal Museum Uldingen, Germany
- State Museum of Fine Arts, Chisinau, Moldova
- «Art 21» Gallery, Munich, Germany
- «Saray» Gallery, Berlin, Germany
- «Five+Art» Gallery, Vienna, Austria
- Foundation's collection of Kisho Kurokawa, Tokyo, Japan
- Gallery of Tokyo University of Arts
- Contemporary Center Guangzhou, China
- and in Private Collections in: Kazakhstan, USA, Turkey, Germany, Russia, Great Britain, Belgium, India, Austria, Japan, Czech Republic and other countries.

== Projects ==
- «ART FORUM KULANSHI», Astana, Kazakhstan, 2006–2012
- «KünsteWoche» Festival Jesteburg, Germany 2005, 2006
- «Internationale Art Festival in Izmir», Türkei, 2004
- «Silk Road by Modern Art» – Gallery "Art 21", München, Germany, 2006
- «Silk Road by Modern Art» – Art Center Berlin, Berlin, Germany, 2006
- «United Buddy Bear» – Germany, the world tour
- «Bangladesch Art Biennale», Dhaka, Bangladesch
- «ART EXPRESS», Berlin-Budapest, Hungary 2008–2009
- «International Art Festival», New Delhi, India, 2013
- «New Silk Roads: Painting Beyond Borders», Singapur, 2015
- «Beijing International Biennale», Beijing, China, 2015
- «Made in Astana», Astana, Kazakhstan, 2016–2018
- «Art Circle» International Art Festival, Gorishka Brda, Slovenia, 2017–2019
- «Astana Street Art», Astana, Kazakhstan, 2018,2019
- «Miami Artweeks. Miami 2.0», Artbox project, Miami, USA, 2019

== Links ==
- My Kazakhstan: Profiles of Individual Stories in an Extraordinary Country
- Personal exhibition of Kazakhstan artist Leyla Mahat opened in the capital of Romania
- Expoziția de pictură „Here I am” Leyla Mahat – 5.11.18 Muzeul de Artă Cluj-Napoca
- Vernisaj HERE I AM
- Eurasian Academy of Arts – An international organisation for research and support in the field of culture and art
- Exhibition of the Kazakh artist Leyla Mahat opened at the palace of peace and harmony
- Finissage: Here I Am Leyla Mahat
- AIFC ART WEEK
- Leyla Mahat – „Here I Am”: A Steppe Flower
- Private Viewing: Leyla Mahat
- Kazakh art in Bucharest: HERE I Am – Leyla Mahat
- In the Romanian city Cluj-Napoca an exhibition of paintings by Kazakh artist Leyla Makhat is taking place
- Ceremonial opening in Astana
- PAINTING AND SCULPTURE
- Leyla Mahat - Saatchi art
- Female Artists Showcased at Nazarbayev Centre
- YouTube: Kulanshi Contemporary art center
