= Umai Art Museum =

Coordinates: 43°15′00″N 76°56′14″E

- Established: 2002
- Location: Almaty
- Type: Art museum

The Umai Art Museum (Russian: Музей искусств “Умай”, tr. muzei iskusstv umai) is the largest private art museum in Almaty, Kazakhstan.

== History ==
The museum was opened in the former PCIA-SCC building in Almaty, as part of a charitable program by Yuri A. Koshkin, who gave the museum a collection of artists’ works, including Zhanatay Shardenov whom the museum is named after. The museum held its first major solo exhibition in 2002, for the 75th anniversary of the artist.

An art school was opened at the Museum of Art, which educated up to 200 people at a time. There was also a children's art school with its own classrooms and even a small buffet for students. Exhibitions of incarcerated artists were regularly held.

From 2006 to 2008, the museum did not function due to legal proceedings over the building's fate. During this period, the art school rented the premises from the Kazakh Academy of Architecture and Construction. Water, heating, and electricity were cut off during the proceedings, leaving the historic building in an unsatisfactory condition. After winning the court case, the museum owner wanted to sell the building and the museum's collection, as many international contacts had been lost.

Still, the art museum continued its work. Thus, in 2011, there was an exhibition of graphic works by young artists under 17 years old, as part of a social charity project to support gifted and talented children.

== Museum exposition ==
The museum contains works of such famous artists as Zhanatai Shardenov, Yuri Koshkin, Arystan Shardenov, Dariga Nazarbayeva, Alzhan Shamiyev, Nurlan Smagulov, and Richard Spooner. The collection of the museum contains works reflecting socialist realism and works written on the theme of factory and rural landscapes, which reveal the beauty of the native land. It counts about 2,000 paintings on these subjects.
