= Nature Museum of the Republic of Kazakhstan =

Museum in Almaty, Kazakhstan

Coordinates: 43°14′36″N 76°56′56″E

Nature Museum of Kazakhstan
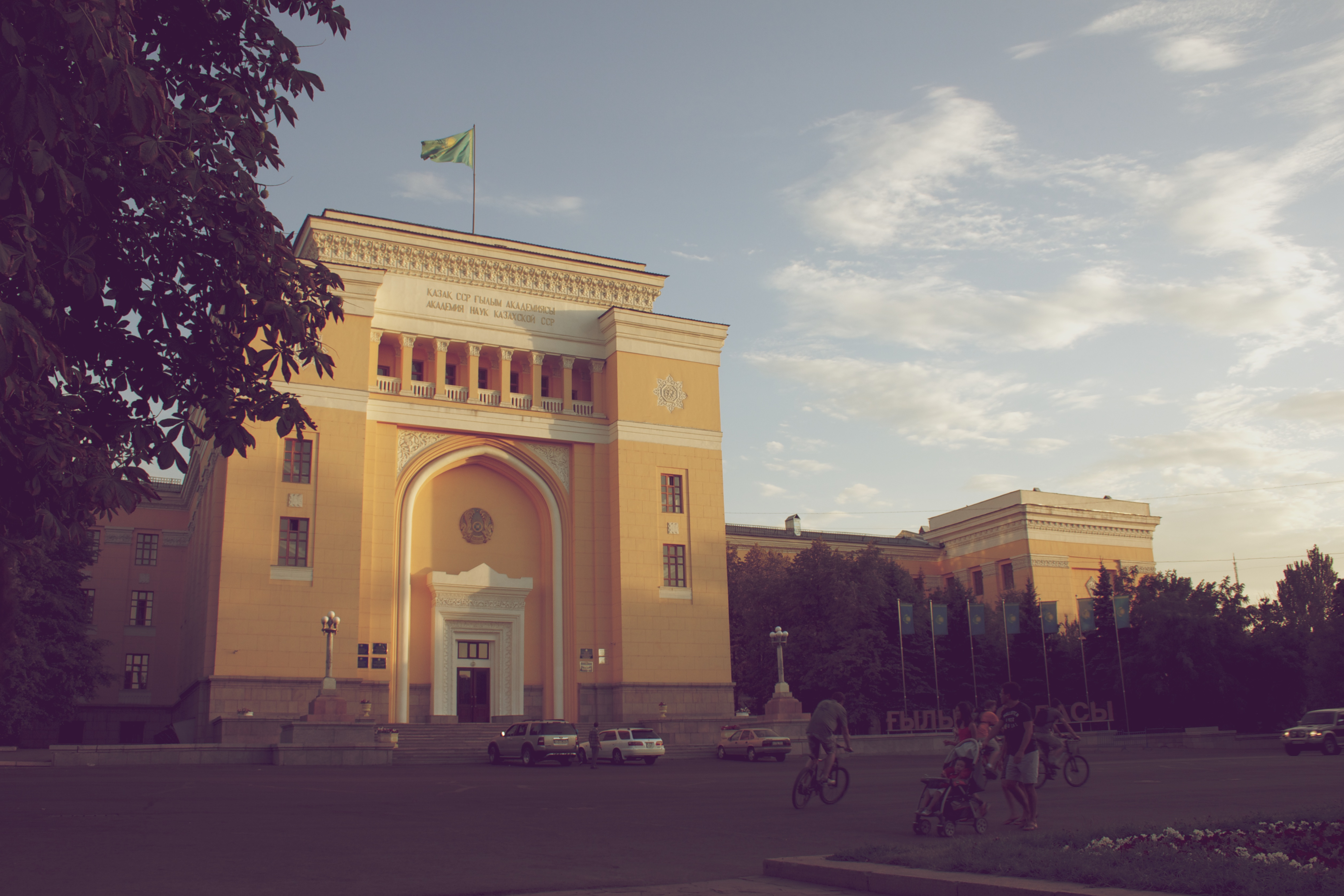
- Established: 1961
- Location: Gylym Ordasy, Almaty, Kazakhstan
- Type: Natural history
- Director: Tleuberdina Piruza Ablaevna

The Nature Museum of the Republic of Kazakhstan (Russian: Музей природы Казахстана, tr. muzei prirody kazakhstana) is a natural history museum of the National Academy of Sciences of Kazakhstan, located on Shevchenko Street 28 in the Gylym Ordasy complex in Almaty.

== History ==
The Museum of Nature and Paleontology opened in 1959 at 85 Lenin Avenue, now Dostyk Avenue. According to the Decree of the Presidium of the Academy of Sciences of the Kazakh SSR № 44 of 29 April 1961, the official opening of the museum was timed to the 40th anniversary of the founding of the Kazakh Soviet Socialist Republic.

In accordance with the Order of the Committee of Science of the Ministry of Education and Science of the Republic of Kazakhstan on 1 June 2010 № 35-PR, the museum was relocated to the Gylym Ordasy in order to preserve, study and popularize the research and collections. In 2012 the museum reopened after reconstruction as part of the Gylym Ordasy complex, in the building of the Academy of Sciences of Kazakhstan.

== Museum exposition ==
The museum is divided into two sections: Paleontological and Zoological. Among the artefacts displayed are fossils of animals and plants, skeletons of dinosaurs, tarbosaurs and other representatives of ancient fauna, discovered as a result of excavations in Kazakhstan. The zoological section of the museum demonstrates the diversity of flora and fauna of Kazakhstan, with displays of books, photographs, stuffed animals and birds, and herbaria. The halls are decorated with drawings of nature from different parts of Kazakhstan. Taxidermy displays include horses, fish, butterflies, moose, sheep, wolves and bears.
