= Almaty Museum =

History museum in Kazakhstan

Coordinates: 43.2487°N 76.9361°E

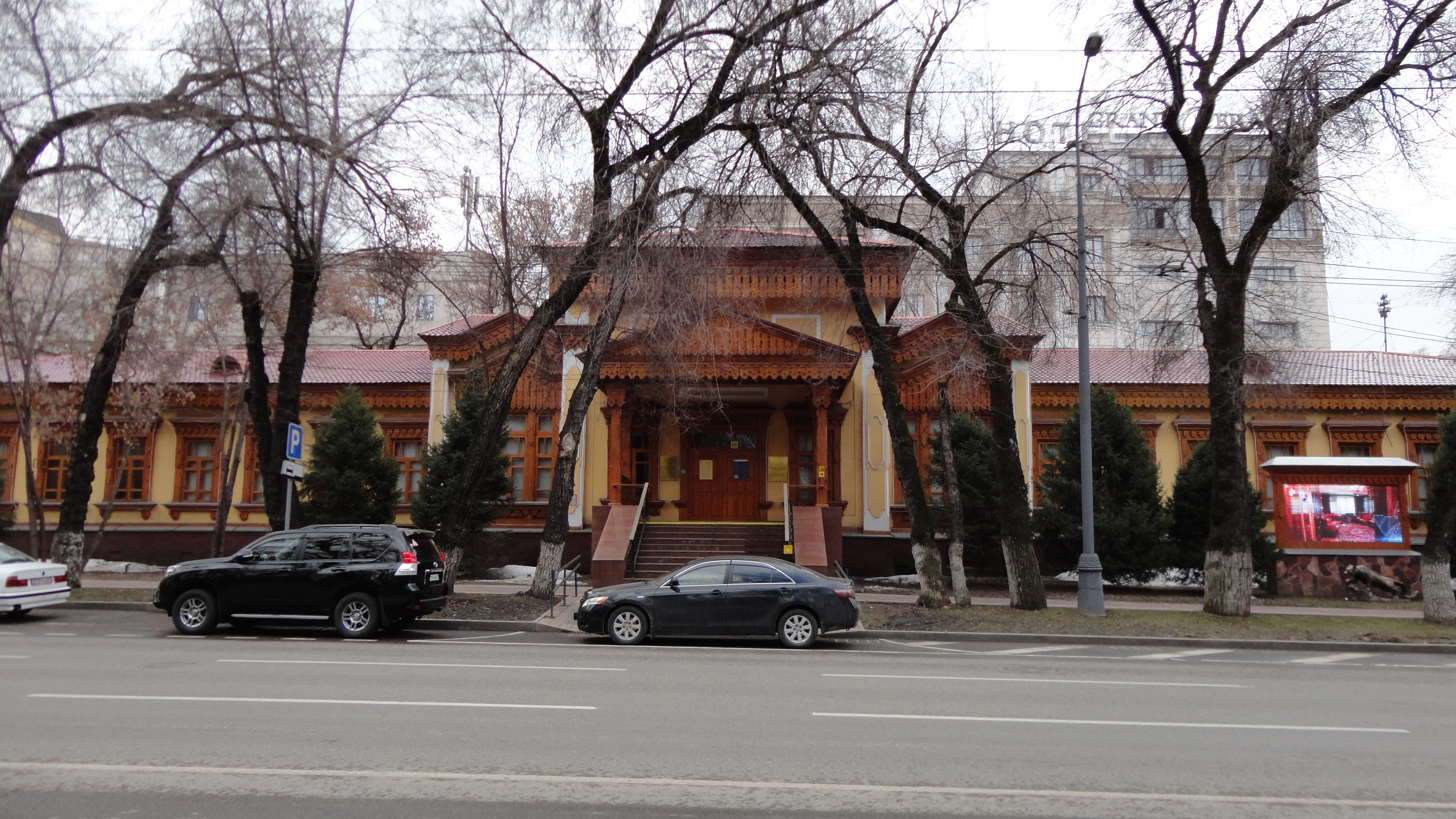
- Established: 2001
- Location: Almaty, Kazakhstan
- Type: History museum

The Almaty Museum is a history museum in Almaty, Kazakhstan, located in the former building of the Vernensky Children's Orphanage. It features exhibits on the history of the city.

== History ==
Almaty Museum was opened in 2001. As part of the Almaty Museum there is a dynastic royal burial complex "Boraldai Sak barrows", which preserved the cultural and natural landscape.

In 2016, the museum moved into the complex of buildings of the former Vernensky orphanage.

The museum exposition includes more than 40 thousand exhibits, divided into 11 eras: "The Ancient History of Almaty", "The Medieval History of Almaty", "At the Origin of Kazakh Statehood", "Ethnography of Zhetysu", "Vernensky Period of Almaty History", "Almaty in the 20th Century", "Development of Culture and Art", "History of Mountaineering", "Zheltoksan", "Almaty and the Leader of a Nation", "Model of Peace and Harmony".

Since August 2017, the museum has taken part in the "Museum for Everyone" program. Special interactive tours have been created for wheelchair users and people with visual and hearing impairments.

The museum is equipped with modern means of displaying exhibits, which allow showing projections of historical video materials and rare artifacts in the form of holograms.

== Museum building ==
The city orphanage was opened in 1878. The building was built in 1892 by architect P. Gurdae for the Vernensky orphanage.

Under the Soviet regime, the building of the former orphanage housed various state institutions: in 1929 - KazTsIK, the Council of People's Commissars, Gosplan KASSR.

At a later time - Children's Clinical Hospital of Infectious Diseases No. 1.

From 1981 to 2016 - City Medical School (now Medical College).

In 2009, Kazrestavratsiya carried out restoration of the building.

The museum is a one-story wooden log rectangular building on a cobble foundation with a basement. The main facade has a symmetrical three-part construction, highlighted by risalites. Plastics are created horizontally by the band of frequent windows, vertically by the blades in the piers. The windows are framed by elaborately carved platbands resting on brackets. The main high-rise entrance is emphasized by a wide staircase.

The side wings of the building housed a school with three departments and a tailoring workshop for girls and a shoemaking and bookbinding workshop for boys. The risalites housed living quarters. A garden, vegetable garden, and flower beds were planted in the south back yard (now the Dinamo Stadium), and a garden was planted by the students in front of the main entrance (now the Pine Park).

During the Soviet time the five-domed Alexander-St. Mary Church was demolished along the axis of the central risalite. In the interiors of the building, the finishing of the walls and ceiling in the form of stucco elements have been preserved.

== Monument status ==
On November 10, 2010, a new State List of Historical and Cultural Monuments of Local Significance in the City of Almaty was approved, simultaneously with which all previous decisions on this subject were declared null and void. In this Resolution, the status of a monument of local importance was retained for the Vernensky orphanage building. The boundaries of the protection zones were approved in 2014.
