= National Museum of the Republic of Kazakhstan =

National museum in Astana, Kazakhstan

- Қазақстан Республикасының Ұлттық музейі
- Location: Astana, Kazakhstan
- Website: Official website

The National Museum of the Republic of Kazakhstan (Kazakh: Қазақстан Республикасының Ұлттық музейі, romanized: Qazaqstan Respublikasynyñ Ūlttyq muzeiı), is located in Astana. When it was built in 2014, it was the largest museum in Central Asia. Made up of blue glass and white marble depicts Kazakhstan's history and culture from prehistoric times to the present. The priceless collection of the National Museum of the Republic of Kazakhstan is made up of numerous treasures that were made public as part of the governmental initiative "Cultural Heritage." The museum's structure draws attention thanks to its distinctive outside shape. According to the Decree of the Head of the State Darkhan Mynbay has been appointed the Director of the National Museum of Kazakhstan.

== Structure ==
According to the Kazakh government website QazaqCulture.com, "The architect of the building is Vladimir Laptev, a member of the Union of Architects of Kazakhstan. The architect started from the idea of a waving flag."
The museum consists of seven blocks that range in size from one to nine stories tall. Around 14,000 square meters of space in 11 halls make up the exhibition area. The halls are composed of the following: Hall of Astana, Hall of Independent Kazakhstan, Hall of Gold, Hall of Ancient and Medieval History, the Hall of History, Ethnography Hall, Halls of Modern Art. A research institution serves as a representation of the museum's organizational structure for studying national heritage. A children's museum, a children's creativity center, two exhibition halls, repair shops, labs, professional storage facilities, a scientific library with a reading room, a conference hall, and gift shops will all have locations on the property.

== Notable exhibits ==
- Issyk Golden Cataphract Warrior

== See also ==
- List of museums in Kazakhstan
- The Museum of the First President of the Republic of Kazakhstan
