= List of Heroes of the Soviet Union (A) =

The Hero of the Soviet Union was the highest distinction of the Soviet Union. It was awarded 12,775 times. Due to the large size of the list, it has been broken up into multiple pages.

- Akhsarbek Abayev
- Konstantin Abazovsky
- Kadi Abakarov
- Dmitry Abalyev ru
- Abdulikhat Abbasov ru
- Karakoz Abdaliev
- Abdel Hakim Amer
- Alimkai Abdershin ru
- Nurken Abdirov
- Mikhail Abdolov ru
- Asaf Abdrakhmanov
- Shamil Abdrashitov ru
- Ali Abdrezakov ru
- Ramil Abdrshin ru
- Sadyk Abduzhabbarov ru
- Abdurakhman Abdulayev ru
- Mamish Abdullayev
- Samad Abdullayev
- Samig Abdulayev ru
- Urunbai Abdulayev ru
- Anvar Abdullin ru
- Mansur Abdullin ru
- Magomed-Zagid Abdulmanapov ru
- Akhmed Abdulmedzhidov ru
- Ivan Abdulov ru
- Teyfuq Abdul
- Uzeir Abduramanov
- Zulpukar Abdurakhmanov ru
- Sadyk Abelkhanov ru
- Mukatai Abeulov ru
- Rem Abzalov ru
- Fetislyam Abilov
- Fakhrutdin Ablyazov ru
- Aleksey Abolikhin ru
- Afanasy Abramov ru
- Vladimir Nikiforovich Abramov ru
- Vladimir Fyodorovich Abramov ru
- Ilya Abramov ru
- Konstantin Kirikovich Abramov ru
- Konstantin Nikolayevich Abramov ru
- Nikolai Abramov ru
- Pyotr Aleksandrovich Abramov ru
- Pyotr Petrovich Abramov ru
- Tikhon Abramov ru
- Shatiel Abramov
- Abram Abramovich ru
- Sergey Abramtsev ru
- Nikolai Abramchuk ru
- Ivan Abrosimov ru
- Mikhail Abrosimov ru
- Anuar Abutalipov ru
- Konstantin Abukhov ru
- Grigory Abyzov ru
- Gazaros Avakyan ru
- Grant Avakyan ru
- Lavrenty Avaliani
- Aleksandr Avdeev
- Anatoly Avdeev ru
- Ivan Avdeev ru
- Mikhail Avdeev ru
- Nikolai Avdeev ru
- Timofey Avdeev ru
- Pyotr Adeenko ru
- Semyon Avdoshkin ru
- Ivan Avekov ru
- Ivan Avelichev ru
- Nikolai Averin ru
- Vasily Averchenko ru
- Nikolai Averchenko ru
- Valentin Averyanov ru
- Vasily Averyanov ru
- Ivan Averyanov ru
- Konstantin Averyanov ru
- Stepan Averyanov ru
- Hunan Avetisyan
- Vasily Avramenko ru
- Mikhail Avramenko ru
- Pyotr Avramenko ru
- Prokopy Avramkov ru
- Nikolai Avrorsky ru
- Temik Avtandylyan ru
- Fedos Avkhachyov ru
- Allaberdy Agaliev ru
- Filipp Agaltsev ru
- Goga Agamirov ru
- Sergey Agapov ru
- Aleksey Ivanovich Agafonov ru
- Aleksey Sergeevich Agafonov ru
- Valentin Agafonov ru
- Georgy Agafonov ru
- Semyon Agafonov ru
- Frol Agafonov ru
- Yakov Grigorievich Agafonov ru
- Yakov Mikhailovich Agafonov ru
- Vasily Ageev ru
- Grigory Ageev ru
- Ivan Ageev ru
- Leonid Ageev ru
- Nikolai Ageev ru
- Pytor Ageev ru
- Filipp Ageev ru
- Grigory Ageshin ru
- Mikhail Agibalov ru
- Viktor Agienko ru
- Fayzulla Agletdinov ru
- Hamit Agliullin ru
- Fyodor Aglotkov ru
- Vasily Adamenko ru
- Ivan Adamenko ru
- Noah Adamia
- Sali Adashev ru
- Vasily Adonkin ru
- Dmitry Adonev ru
- Ivan Adushkin ru
- Tulebai Azhimov ru
- Vasily Azhogin ru
- Klychniyaz Azalov ru
- Aleksey Azarov ru
- Vasily Azarov ru
- Yevgeny Azarov ru
- Pyotr Azarov ru
- Semyon Azarov ru
- Sergey Azarov ru
- Mikhail Azev ru
- Domullo Azizoz ru
- Ruzi Azimov ru
- Yuri Azovkin ru
- Aleksandr Azonchik ru
- Mehmet Aipov
- Grigory Ayrapetyan ru
- Armen Ayriev
- Selim Aitkulov
- Izgutty Aytykov ru
- Yusup Akayev ru
- Boris Akazyonok
- Viktor Akatov ru
- Uzarak Akbauov ru
- Azis Akzhigitov ru
- Aleksandr Akimov ru
- Vasily Akimov ru
- Viktor Akimov ru
- Grigory Akimov ru
- Ivan Akimov ru
- Mikhail Ilyich Akimov ru
- Mikhail Pavlovich Akimov ru
- Fyodor Akimov ru
- Yegor Akinyayev ru
- Sergey Akifev ru
- Nikolai Akishin ru
- Fyodor Akkuratov ru
- Ruben Akopyan ru
- Gevork Akopyants ru
- Gazanfar Akbarov
- Nabi Akramov ru
- Aleksandr Afanasevich Aksyonov ru
- Aleksandr Mikhailovich Aksyonov ru
- Vladimir Aksyonov
- Konstantin Vladimirovich Aksyonov ru
- Konstantin Filippovich Aksyonov ru
- Nikolai Aksyutin ru
- Makhmut Aktuganov ru
- Vladimir Akulenko ru
- Fyodor Akulishnin ru
- Pyotr Akulov ru
- Mikhail Akutin ru
- Pyotr Akutsionok ru
- Fyodor Alabugin ru
- Yuri Alasheev ru
- Aleksandr Algazin ru
- Aleksey Aldoshin ru
- Pyotr Aldunenko ru
- Aleksey Aleevsky ru
- Aleksandr Aleynikov ru
- Ivan Aleynikov ru
- Sergey Aleynikov ru
- Mikayil Alakbarov
- Ivan Aleksandrenko ru
- Aleksandr Panayotov Aleksandrov
- Aleksandr Pavlovich Aleksandrov (twice)
- Aleksey Aleksandrov ru
- Andrey Aleksandrov ru
- Vasily Aleksandrov ru
- Vyacheslav Aleksandrov
- Gennady Petrovich Aleksandrov (pilot) ru
- Gennady Petrovich Aleksandrov (tankman) ru
- Mikhail Aleksandrov ru
- Nikita Aleksandrov ru
- Nikolai Aleksandrov ru
- Fyodor Aleksandrov ru
- Vasily Aleksandrovsky ru
- Viktor Aleksandryuk ru
- Nikolai Aleksashkin ru
- Aleksandr Alekseevich Alekseev ru
- Aleksandr Ivanovich Alekseev ru
- Anatoly Dmitrievich Alekseev ru
- Anatoly Ivanovich Alekseev ru
- Andrey Alekseev ru
- Boris Andreev Alekseev ru
- Boris Pavlovich Alekseev ru
- Vasily Alekseev ru
- Vladimir Alekseev
- Georgy Alekseev ru
- Grigory Alekseevich Alekseev ru
- Grigory Fedotovich Alekseev ru
- Yevsey Alekseev ru
- Ivan Epifanovich Alekseev ru
- Ivan Mikhailovich Alekseev ru
- Ivan Pavlovich Alekseev ru
- Konstantin Alekseev ru
- Maksim Alekseev ru
- Modest Alekseev ru
- Nikolai Alekseevich Alekseev ru
- Nikolai Vasilyevich Alekseev ru
- Nikolai Mikhailovich Alekseev ru
- Pavel Alekseev ru
- Sergey Alekseev ru
- Yakov Alekseev ru
- Aleksandr Alekseenko ru
- Georgy Alekseenko ru
- Konstantin Alekseenko ru
- Timofey Alekseychuk ru
- Vladimir Aleksenko (twice)
- Yuozas Aleksonis ru
- Vasily Aleksukhin ru
- Aleksey Alelyukhin (twice)
- Anton Alekhnovich ru
- Yevgeny Alekhnovich ru
- Andrey Alyoshin
- Nikolai Alyoshin ru
- Semyon Alyoshin ru
- Stepan Aleshkevich ru
- Aleksandr Alyoshkin ru
- Aleksandr Aliyev ru
- Gasret Aliyev
- Mastan Aliyev
- Said Aliyev ru
- Shamsulla Aliyev
- Abylai Alimbetov ru
- Ivan Alimenkov ru
- Ivan Alimkin ru
- Zarif Alimov ru
- Vasily Alin ru
- Sadyk Alinazarov ru
- Vladimir Aliseyko ru
- Vasily Alisov ru
- Sultan Alisultanov ru
- Nikolai Alifanov ru
- Vladimir Alkidov ru
- Museyib Allahverdiyev
- Avgust Allik ru
- Galaktion Alpaidze
- Nikolai Alpatov ru
- Semyon Alpeev ru
- Aleksandr Altunin
- Ivan Sergeevich Altukhov ru
- Ivan Filippovich Altukhov ru
- Nikolai Altynov ru
- Vsevold Alfyorov ru
- Ivan Alfyorov ru
- Nikolai Alferev ru
- Dmitry Alfimov ru
- Vladimir Alkhimov ru
- Vasily Altsybeev ru
- Aleksey Alymov ru
- Marcel Albert
- Veniamin Albetkov ru
- Ivan Alyayev ru
- Ivan Alyapkin ru
- Ashot Amatuni
- Ivan Amvrosov ru
- Aleksey Amelin ru
- Georgy Amelin ru
- Sergey Amelichkin ru
- Amet Sultan Amet-khan (twice)
- Konstantin Amzin ru
- Viktor Amiev ru
- Minnetdin Aminov ru
- Hallok Aminov
- Safar Amirshoev
- Aleksandr Amosenkov ru
- Aleksandr Amosov ru
- Georgy Amyaga ru
- Daniil Anachenko ru
- Ivan Ananev ru
- Martyn Ananev ru
- Nikolai Ananev ru
- Pyotr Ananev ru
- Stepan Ananin ru
- Mikhail Anashkin
- Igor Andzaurov ru
- Jacques André
- Aleksandr Andreev ru
- Aleksey Dmitrievich Andreev ru
- Aleksey Sergeevich Andreev ru
- Anatoly Andreev ru
- Andrey Ivanovich Andreev ru
- Andrey Matveevich Andreev
- Vasily Alekseevich Andreev ru
- Vasily Apollonovich Andreev ru
- Viktor Andreev ru
- Vladimir Andreev ru
- Georgy Andreev ru
- German Andreev ru
- Grigory Andreev ru
- Yevgeny Andreev
- Ivan Yefimovich Andreev ru
- Ivan Fyodorovich Andreev ru
- Kesar Andreev ru
- Kirill Andreev ru
- Mikhail Andreev ru
- Nikolai Mikhailovich Andreev ru
- Nikolai Pavlovich Andreev ru
- Nikolai Rodionovich Andreev ru
- Nikolai Trofimovich Andreev ru
- Nikolai Fyodorovich Andreev ru
- Pyotr Andreev ru
- Semyon Andreev ru
- Filipp Andreev ru
- Yevgeny Andreenko ru
- Nikolai Andreenkov ru
- Ilya Andreyko ru
- Nikolai Andreyko ru
- Vasily Andreychenko ru
- Aleksey Andreshov ru
- Vasily Andreyanov ru
- Andrey Andrianov ru
- Vasily Andrianov (twice)
- Ilya Andrianov ru
- Vasily Andrienko ru
- Aleksandr Andriyanov ru
- Vasily Andronov ru
- Nikolai Androsov ru
- Ivan Androshchuk ru
- Valentin Andrusenko ru
- Kornei Andrusenko
- Husen Andrukhayev ru
- Ilya Andryukhin ru
- Yakov Andryushin ru
- Nikolai Andryushok ru
- Vladimir Andryushchenko ru
- Grigory Andryushchenko ru
- Sergey Andryushchenko ru
- Yakov Andryushchenko ru
- Nikolai Aleksandrovich Anikin ru
- Nikolai Andreevich Anikin ru
- Vladimir Anisenkov ru
- Aleksey Anisimov ru
- Vasily Anisimov ru
- Viktor Vasilyevich Anisimov ru
- Viktor Dmitrievich Anisimov ru
- Yevstafy Anisimov ru
- Pyotr Anisimov ru
- Yakov Anisimov ru
- Fyodor Anisichkin ru
- Aleksandr Aniskin ru
- Mikhail Aniskin ru
- Vladimir Anisov ru
- Stepan Anisov ru
- Aleksandr Anishchenko ru
- Sergey Anishchenko ru
- Pavel Anishchekov ru
- Yegor Ankudinov ru
- Ivan Ankudinov ru
- Oras Annayev ru
- Mikhail Anoprienko ru
- Nikolai Anosov ru
- Aleksey Anokhin ru
- Dmitry Anokhin ru
- Ivan Anokhin ru
- Konstantin Anokhin ru
- Sergey Grigorievich Anokhin ru
- Sergey Nikolaevich Anokhin
- Mikhail Anoshin ru
- Fyodor Anoshchenkov ru
- Anatoly Anpilov ru
- Nikolai Ansimov ru
- Fyodor Antashkevich ru
- Avak Antinyan ru
- Iosif Antipenko ru
- Ivan Alekseevich Antipin ru
- Ivan Nikolayevich Antipin ru
- Mikhail Antipin ru
- Filipp Antipin ru
- Mikhail Antipov ru
- Pyotr Antipov ru
- Yuri Antipov ru
- Aleksey Antonenko ru
- Kuzma Antonenko ru
- Nikita Antonets ru
- Aleksandr Antonov ru
- Anatoly Antonov ru
- Anton Antonov ru
- Vasily Dmitrievich Antonov ru
- Vasily Petrovich Antonov ru
- Vladimir Aleksandrovich Antonov ru
- Vladimir Semyonovich Antonov ru
- Grigory Antonov ru
- Ivan Vasilyevich Antonov ru
- Ivan Nikolayevich Antonov ru
- Ivan Petrovich Antonov ru
- Ilya Antonov ru
- Konstantin Antonov ru
- Mikhail Antonov ru
- Neon Antonov
- Nikolai Grigorievich Antonov ru
- Nikolai Dmitrievich Antonov (1909—1986) ru
- Nikolai Dmitrievich Antonov (1922—2000) ru
- Nikolai Ivanovich Antonov ru
- Semyon Antonov ru
- Fyodor Antonov ru
- Yakov Andreevich Antonov ru
- Yakov Ivanovich Antonov ru
- Stepan Antonyuk ru
- Yakov Antoshin ru
- Ivan Antoshkin ru
- Nikolai Pavlovich Antoshkin ru
- Nikolai Timofeevich Antoshkin
- Vasily Antropov ru
- Mikhail Antyasov ru
- Mitrofan Anufriev ru
- Pyotr Anuchkin ru
- Nikolai Anfinogenov ru
- Pavel Antseborenko
- Aleksandr Antsupov ru
- Aleksandr Anchugov ru
- Maksim Aparin ru
- Stanislovas Apivala ru
- Ivan Apletov ru
- Sergey Apraksin ru
- Suren Arakelyan ru
- Aleksey Arapov
- Gafiatulla Araslanov ru
- Nikolai Argunov ru
- Valentin Ardashev ru
- Leonid Ardashev ru
- Yakov Ardintsev ru
- Pavel Ardyshev ru
- Ivan Arendarenko ru
- Konstantin Arefev ru
- Pyotr Arefev ru
- Nikolai Arzhanov ru
- Gurgen Arzumanov ru
- Dmitry Aristarkhov ru
- Yegor Aristov ru
- Grigory Arlashkin ru
- Pol Arman ru
- Grigory Armashev ru
- Raisa Aronova
- Valery Arsyonov ru
- Ivan Arsenev ru
- Nikolai Arsenev ru
- Aleksandr Arsenyuk ru
- Aleksey Artamonov ru
- Vasily Artamonov ru
- Viktor Artamonov ru
- Vladimir Artamonov ru
- Ivan Ilyich Artamonov ru
- Ivan Artamonov ru
- Nikolai Artamonov
- Stepan Artamonov ru
- Fyodor Artamonov ru
- Aleksandr Artyomenko ru
- Anatoly Artyomenko ru
- Stepan Artyomenko (twice)
- Yuri Artyomenko ru
- Pavel Artyomov ru
- Pyotr Artyomov ru
- Aleksandr Artyomtsev ru
- Grigory Artemchenkov ru
- Aleksandr Artemev ru
- Ivan Artemev ru
- Nikolai Artemev ru
- Timofey Artemev ru
- Fyodor Andreevich Artemev ru
- Fyodor Polikarpovich Artemev ru
- Ilya Artishchev ru
- Georgy Artozeev ru
- Aleksandr Artyuk ru
- Vladimir Artyuk ru
- Yuri Artyukhin
- Georgy Arustamov ru
- Mikhail Arutyunov ru
- Aydin Arutyunyan ru
- Nikolai Arkhangelsky ru
- Pavel Arkharov ru
- Fyodor Arkhipenko
- Vasily Sergeevich Arkhipov (twice)
- Vasily Stepanovich Arkhipov ru
- Nikolai Arkhipov ru
- Yuri Arkhipov ru
- Anatoly Artsebarsky
- Nikolai Archakov ru
- Boris Arshintsev ru
- Vasily Aryaev ru
- Garay Asadov
- Boris Asadchikh ru
- Jumash Asanaliev ru
- Dair Asanov
- Aleksey Aseev ru
- Grigory Aseev ru
- Igor Aseev ru
- Fyodor Aseev ru
- Ivan Asessorov ru
- Vasily Askalepov
- Aleksey Askarov ru
- Gayfutdin Askin ru
- Suren Aslamazashvili ru
- Hazi Aslanov (twice)
- Aleksandr Asmanov ru
- Ivan Asmolov ru
- Ashot Asriyan ru
- Vasily Astafyev ru
- Ivan Astafev ru
- Ivan Ivanovich Astakhov ru
- Ivan Mikhailovich Astakhov ru
- Yegor Astashin ru
- Mikhail Astashkin ru
- Sergey Astrakhantsev ru
- Zakir Asfandiyarov ru
- Sergey Asyamov ru
- Annaklych Atayev
- Mukhammed Atayev ru
- Adam Ataman ru
- Pyotr Atamanovsky ru
- Grigory Atamanchuk ru
- Semyon Atrokhov ru
- Oleg Atkov
- Toktar Aubakirov
- Vasily Aulov ru
- Koigeldy Aukhadiev ru
- Ruslan Aushev
- Ivan Afanasenko
- Aleksandr Nikiforovich Afanasyev ru
- Aleksandr Petrovich Afanasyev ru
- Aleksandr Fadeevich Afanasyev ru
- Aleksey Afanasevich Afanasyev ru
- Aleksey Ivanovich Afanasyev ru
- Aleksey Nikolayevich Afanasyev ru
- Anatoly Afanasyev ru
- Boris Afanasyev ru
- Vasily Nikolaevich Afanasyev ru
- Vasily Safronovich Afanasyev ru
- Viktor Mikhailovich Afanasyev (cosmonaut)
- Viktor Mikhailovich Afanasyev (soldier) ru
- Vladimir Afanasyev ru
- Ivan Afanasyev ru
- Kuzma Afanasyev ru
- Mikhail Andreevich Afanasyev ru
- Mikhail Denisovich Afanasyev ru
- Nikifor Afanasyev ru
- Nikolai Ivanovich Afanasyev ru
- Nikolai Fyodorovich Afanasyev ru
- Pavel Afanasyev ru
- Semyon Afanasyev ru
- Sergey Afanasyev ru
- Fyodor Afanasyev ru
- Yakov Afanasyev ru
- Ivan Afonin ru
- Aleksey Afrikanov ru
- Filipp Akhayev ru
- Mutyk Akhmadullin ru
- Fazulyan Akhmaletdinov ru
- Andrey Akhmametev ru
- Alexey Akhmanov
- Jamil Ahmadov
- Mikhail Akhmedov ru
- Turgun Akhmedov ru
- Tukhtasin Akhmedov ru
- Fatulla Akhmedov ru
- Gabit Akhmedov ru
- Hakimyan Akhmetgalin ru
- Zaynetdin Akhmetzyanov ru
- Abdulla Akhmetov ru
- Kayum Akhmetshin ru
- Yagafar Akhmetshin ru
- Kasim Akhmirov ru
- Nikifor Akhremenko ru
- Sergey Akhromeev
- Enver Akhsarov ru
- Mikhail Akhtyrchenko ru
- Sobir Akhtyamov ru
- Hasan Akhtyamov ru
- Anatoly Achkasov ru
- Sergey Achkasov ru
- Yakov Achkasov ru
- Aydamir Achmizov ru
- Mikhail Ashik ru
- Akhmetrashit Ashirbekov ru
- Seitkasim Ashirov ru
- Fyodor Ashmarov ru
- Nikita Ashurkov ru
- Eduard Ayanyan ru
