= List of Uzbek Heroes of the Soviet Union =

This is a list of people awarded the title Hero of the Soviet Union who were Uzbek.

- Samig Abdullayev ru
- Urinboy Abdullayev ru
- Soli Adashev ru
- Ruzi Azimov ru
- Sadyk Alinazarov ru
- Hallok Aminov ru
- Turgun Akhmedov ru
- Tukhtasin Akhmedov ru
- Botir Boboyev ru
- Tojiali Boboyev ru
- Tukhtasin Boboyev ru
- Abdusalim Dehqonboyev ru
- Qochqar Durdiyev ru
- Bois Ergashev ru
- Sharif Ergashev ru
- Toʻychi Eryigitov ru
- Mikhail Fayazov ru
- Nematjon Hakimov ru
- Muydin Hasanov ru
- Ernafas Hojayev ru
- Jumaniyaz Hudaybergenov ru
- Ziyamat Husanov ru
- Sapar Hushnazarov ru
- Kurbanbai Irisbekov ru
- Yuri Islamov ru
- Ishankul Ismailov ru
- Abdusattar Ishankulov ru
- Tashmamat Jumaboyev ru
- Kamol Jamolov ru
- Orozboy Jumaniyozov ru
- Gulyam Karimov ru
- Sulgi Lutfullin ru
- Jura Mahmudov ru
- Ravshan Mahmudov ru
- Nabijan Minboyev ru
- Vali Nabiev ru
- Inayat Nauruzboyev ru
- Pirimqul Nurmonov ru
- Satym Nurmetov ru
- Qoʻchqor Qarshiyev ru
- Ochil Qodirov
- Elboy Qoraboyev ru
- Saidusmon Qosimxoʻjayev ru
- Aleksey Qurbanov ru
- Ahmedjan Qurbanov ru
- Abdusattar Rakhimov ru
- Sobir Rakhimov
- Tashtemir Rustemov ru
- Botobay Sadykov ru
- Ahmedjan Shukurov ru
- Qudrat Suyunov ru
- Mamadali Topivoldiyev
- Jurakul Turoyev ru
- Ablakul Uzakov ru
- Solih Umarov ru
- Shadman Umarov ru
- Muhitdin Umurdinov ru
- Ilyas Urazov ru
- Chutak Urazov ru
- Jurazan Usmanov ru
- Islam Usmanov ru
- Urumbek Yakibov ru
- Gulyam Yakubov ru
- Kasim Yakubov ru
- Abdullaazis Yuldashev ru
- Fayzulla Yuldashev ru
