= Aminov =

Aminov is a surname. Notable people with the surname include:

- Agha Aminov (1888–1922), Azerbaijani statesman
- Hallok Aminov (1915–1993), Soviet military personnel
- Vladislav Aminov (born 1977), Russian swimmer

== See also ==
- Aminoff family
