= Artemenko =

Artemenko (Артеменко), Russified as Artyomenko (Артёменко) is a Ukrainian-language surname derived from the first name Artyom. Notable people with the surname include:

- Andrii Artemenko, Ukrainian politician
- Oleksandr Artemenko, Ukrainian footballer
- Stepan Artyomenko, World War II double Hero of the Soviet Union
- Svyatik Artemenko, Canadian soccer player
