= Serikqazi Bekbosinov =

- Серікқазы Бекбосынов
- Born: 21 September 1925; Kzyl-Orda village (present-day Semipalatinsk Oblast, Kazakhstan)
- Died: 22 March 1977 (aged 51); Ulan District, Kazakh SSR, USSR
- Military career
- Allegiance: Soviet Union
- Branch: Red Army
- Service years: 1943–1947
- Rank: senior sergeant
- Conflicts: World War II
- Awards: Hero of the Soviet Union

Serikqazi Bekbosinov (Kazakh: Серікқазы Бекбосынов, Russian: Сериккасы Бекбосунов; 21 September 1925 — 22 March 1977) was a Kazakh soldier in the Red Army who distinguished himself in the Svir-Petrozavodsk operation. He was awarded the title Hero of the Soviet Union on 21 July 1944.

== See also ==
- List of Kazakh Heroes of the Soviet Union
