= The Living Room Candidate =

Website

The Living Room Candidate is a website created by the American Museum of the Moving Image in 2004. It consists of U.S. presidential election campaign commercials dating back to the Dwight D. Eisenhower⁣ —⁣ Adlai Stevenson race of 1952. The website features campaign ads from every Presidential race starting in 1952 until 2024. It also provides complete transcripts for featured advertisements, summaries of the Presidential races in which they were featured, and the results of the elections.

The commercials are primarily classified by the political party which produced the ad. However, advertisements are also placed into a variety of other categories including "Backfire", "Biographical", "Children", "Commander-in-Chief", "Documentary", "Fear", and "Real People".

The website also features "The Desktop Candidate," which describes the internet's role in modern Presidential Races.
