= Seytqasim Ashirov =

Kazakh soldier during World War II (1924 - 2004)

- Сейітқасым Әшіров
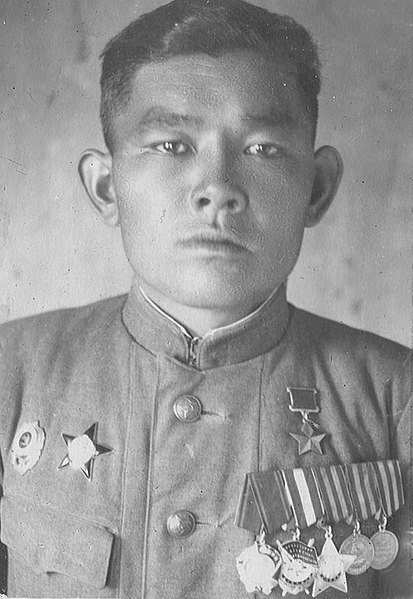
- Seytkasim Ashirov
- Born: 7 November 1924; Kogam village, Turkestan ASSR, RSFSR, USSR
- Died: 30 June 2004 (aged 79)
- Military career
- Allegiance: Soviet Union
- Branch: Red Army
- Service years: 1942–1946
- Rank: starshina
- Conflicts: World War II
- Awards: Hero of the Soviet Union

Seytqasim Ashirov (Kazakh: Сейітқасым Әшіров, Russian: Сейткасим Аширов; 7 November 1924 — 30 June 2004) was a Kazakh soldier in the Red Army during World War II. As a reconnaissance commander in the 331st Infantry Regiment he led intense reconnaissance missions behind enemy lines. He was awarded the title Hero of the Soviet Union on 24 March 1945 for his work. After the war he worked as director of a sovkhoz.

== See also ==
- List of Kazakh Heroes of the Soviet Union
