= Ivan Antonov (sniper) =

- Native name: Иван Петрович Антонов
- Born: 7 July 1920; Gorbunovo, Tver Governorate, RSFSR
- Died: 22 March 1989 (aged 68) Leningrad, USSR
- Allegiance: Soviet Union
- Branch: Red Navy
- Service years: 1940–1953
- Rank: Lieutenant
- Conflicts: World War II
- Awards: Hero of the Soviet Union

Ivan Petrovich Antonov (Russian: Иван Петрович Антонов; 7 July 1920 – 22 March 1989) was a sniper in the Red Navy who killed over 300 enemy soldiers between 1941 and 1942, for which he was awarded the title Hero of the Soviet Union.

== Early life ==
Antonov was born on 7 July 1920 to a working-class Russian family in Gorbunovo. After completing his tenth grade of school he worked as a manager of a club in his home village before he joined the Navy in 1941. He studied at the United School of Junior Aviation Specialists.

== World War II ==
Right after the Soviet Union was attacked by Nazi Germany he fought in the defense of Tallinn as part of the Baltic Fleet, which was a key port city. After the mass transition of Soviet ships from Tallinn to Konstadt. As a rifleman in the 160th Separate Rifle Company, he became one of the founders of the sniper movement in the Baltic Sea Fleet. Early in the war, he did sniper hunts in his free time, manning naval guns on the shore. By August 1942 he killed 118 enemy soldiers, and by the end of the year, he killed over 300 Nazis. He also trained many other snipers, who went on to kill over 1,000 Nazis during the war. After he was awarded the title Hero of the Soviet Union on 22 February 1943 he continued to fight, killing about 360 enemies in total, which included 20 enemy snipers. He fought mostly near Leningrad and was wounded three times in the war, but always returned to fight after recovering.

== Postwar ==
He remained in the navy after the war, leaving with the rank of lieutenant in 1953. He lived in Leningrad, where he studied at the Leningrad Institute of Soviet Trade before working at the Lengastronom food base. He died on 16 March 1989. In 2019 an anti-mine ship was named in his honor.

== Awards ==
- Hero of the Soviet Union (22 February 1943)
- Two Order of Lenin (3 September 1942 and 22 February 1943)
- Order of the Patriotic War 1st class (11 March 1985)
