= Annaklych Atayev =

Soviet military personnel (1912–1943)

- Аннаклыч Атаев
- Born: 1912; Bedrikent, Dashoguz velayat of Turkmenistan
- Died: January 22, 1943 (aged 30–31) height of 79.9, near Belaya Kalitva, Rostov Oblast
- Military career
- Allegiance: Soviet Union
- Branch: 112th volunteer Bashkir cavalry division
- Service years: 1934–37, since 1941
- Rank: Lieutenant
- Conflicts: World War II
- Awards: Hero of the Soviet Union

Annaklych Atayev (Russian: Аннаклыч Атаев) (1912–1943) – squadron commander of the 294th cavalry regiment of the 112th volunteer Bashkir cavalry division of the 8th cavalry corps of the 5th tank army of the Southwestern Front, lieutenant, Hero of the Soviet Union.

== Biography ==
Born in 1912 in the village of Bedrikent, now the Ruhubelent etrap of the Dashoguz velayat of Turkmenistan, into a peasant family. Turkmen by nationality.

He graduated from the Chardjou Pedagogical College, then worked as a school director in the urban-type settlement of Takhta, then as an instructor at the Tashauz Regional Council of Osoaviakhim.

He served in the Red Army in 1934–37 and since 1941. He took part in the battles of the Great Patriotic War from 1942.

Commander of the 1st Squadron of the 294th Cavalry Regiment (112th Bashkir Volunteer Cavalry Division, 8th Cavalry Corps, 5th Tank Army, Southwestern Front).

On January 21, 1943, Ataev's unit of 30 people crossed the frozen ice of the Seversky Donets River and with a sudden night strike, captured the dominant height of 79.9 in the enemy's defense line near the city of Belaya Kalitva, Rostov Oblast, and held it until reinforcements arrived.

On the first day, the defenders of the height destroyed more than 200 enemy soldiers. 17 soldiers survived. The next day, the Germans threw an infantry battalion into battle with the support of 10 tanks. Ataev's detachment destroyed another 450 enemy soldiers and knocked out 3 tanks. In just two days of continuous fighting, the squadron repulsed seven enemy attacks, destroying about three hundred enemy soldiers, three tanks, and an armored vehicle. Ataev died on January 22.

According to the decree of the Presidium of the Supreme Soviet of the USSR "On conferring the title of Hero of the Soviet Union to the command and rank and file of the Red Army" dated March 31, 1943, Atayev was posthumously awarded the title Hero of the Soviet Union. The command presented the fighters who fought with Ataev to the title of Hero of the Soviet Union, but in the end, the fighters were posthumously awarded the Order of the Patriotic War, I degree.

In the spring, when the snow melted, local residents of the village of mine No. 3 (now the village of Ataev) buried the bodies of the defenders of the height in the trench and looked after the grave. In 1965, the bodies of the dead were reburied in a mass grave on the Square of the Fallen Fighters of the city.

== Citation ==
In these bloody battles, the glorious son of Turkmenistan, Lieutenant Annaklych Atayev, immortalized his name forever. His saber squadron, consisting of 29 people, was ordered to take possession of the fortified height and hold it, covering the 112th Cavalry Division from the enemy's attack on the flank and rear. The squadron with a dashing raid knocked out the Nazis from several brick buildings and entrenched themselves at a height. The enemy tried to regain this important stronghold. German submachine gunners, supported by artillery and armored vehicles, unsuccessfully attacked a handful of horsemen seven times in one day.

The next day, Atayev's squadron was attacked by a German infantry battalion with 16 tanks. The armament of the cavalry consisted only of machine guns, carbines, sabers, two or three dozen anti-tank and 60 hand grenades, 40 bottles of combustible mixture. Only 16 cavalrymen survived, and even those were wounded. And yet they did not leave the height

All the brave souls died in this battle, but they completed their task to the end

The brave commander of the guard squadron, Lieutenant Annaklych Atayev, who was posthumously awarded the high title of Hero of the Soviet Union, also fell to the death of the brave.

== Memory ==
- At the site of the death of 29 Atayev soldiers from the 112th Bashkir Cavalry Division, a three-meter white marble obelisk was erected.
- The name of A. Atayev is carved in golden letters on memorial plaques along with the names of all 78 Heroes of the Soviet Union of the 112th Bashkir (16th Guards Chernigov) Cavalry Division. The boards are installed in the National Museum of the Republic of Bashkortostan and in the Museum of the 112th (16th Guards) Bashkir Cavalry Division.
- Atayev's name was given to school No. 2 in Belaya Kalitva.
- In 1968, on the 25th anniversary of the liberation of the city of Belaya Kalitva, a monument was erected on the nameless height where the heroes fought. The people called this height "The Height of Immortality".
- Honorary Citizen of Belaya Kalitva

== Awards ==
- Order of Lenin
- Hero of Turkmenistan (posthumously)

== Books ==
- М. М. Загорулько, ed. (2012). Сталинградская битва. Июль 1942 — февраль 1943: энциклопедия (5th ed.). Волгоград: Издатель. p. 53.
- Ф.Н.Вахитов; Н.И.Камалова (2005). Слава башкирских конников. Уфа: Китап. pp. 57–59.
