= Selim Aitkulov =

Tatar Soviet Red Army soldier

- Сәлим Айткулов
- Born: 10 January 1913; Muhorsky village, Ural Oblast, Russian Empire
- Died: 24 April 1975 (aged 62); Uralsk, Kazakh SSR, Soviet Union (now Kazakhstan)
- Military career
- Allegiance: Soviet Union
- Branch: Red Army
- Service years: 1941–1945
- Rank: Junior lieutenant
- Unit: 75th Guards Rifle Division
- Conflicts: World War II; Battle of the Dnieper
- Awards: Hero of the Soviet Union; Order of Lenin; Medal "For Courage"

Selim Aitkulov (Tatar: Сәлим Айткулов; Kazakh: Сәлім Нығметұлы Айтқұлов; 10 January 1913 – 24 April 1975) was a Tatar soldier of the Red Army and Hero of the Soviet Union. Aitkulov was awarded the title Hero of the Soviet Union and the Order of Lenin for actions during the Battle of the Dnieper, in which he took command of his platoon after his platoon commander was wounded. After the war, Aitkulov was the head of the Uralsk Regional Consumer Union's Organization Department.

== Early life ==
Selim Aitkulov was born on 10 January 1913 in Muhorsky village in the Ural Oblast to a Tatar peasant family. He graduated from ninth grade in 1930 and worked at a factory in Uralsk.

== World War II ==
In July 1941, Aitkulov was drafted into the Red Army and fought in combat from September of that year. He fought in the Battle of Kharkov in May 1942. In 1943, he joined the Communist Party of the Soviet Union. In July 1943, Aitkulov fought in the Battle of Kursk. On August 31, 1943, Aitkulov received the Medal "For Courage" for his actions.

At the end of September, Aitkulov was an Efreitor in the 231st Guards Rifle Regiment of the 75th Guards Rifle Division. During the Battle of the Dnieper, he reportedly crossed the Dnieper multiple times on reconnaissance patrols and intelligence gathering missions. On 29 September, during fighting in the village of Yasnogorodka in Vyshhorod Raion, he reportedly took command after his platoon commander was wounded. Allegedly, the platoon repulsed nine German counterattacks. Aitkulov continued to lead the platoon and repulsed three counterattacks on 5 October. Allegedly, he was severely wounded but stayed in combat and killed four German soldiers with two grenades. On 17 October, Aitkulov was awarded the title Hero of the Soviet Union and the Order of Lenin. After recovering from his wounds, Aitkulov was sent to the Odessa Infantry School and was promoted to junior lieutenant upon graduation. He returned to combat and fought in battles in Poland and Czechoslovakia.

== Postwar ==
Aitkulov was discharged at the rank of Junior lieutenant. After the end of World War II, Aitkulov returned to Uralsk and worked as the head of the organization department of the regional consumers' union. He died on 24 April 1975 and is buried in Uralsk.
