= Tulen Kabilov =

Kazakh Red Army sergeant and posthumous Hero of the Soviet Union

- Төлен Қабылов
- Born: 1917; Asy-Saga, Semirechye Oblast
- Died: 10 April 1945 (aged 27–28); Königsberg
- Military career
- Allegiance: Soviet Union
- Branch: Red Army
- Service years: 1942–1945
- Rank: Sergeant
- Unit: 24th Guards Rifle Division
- Conflicts: World War II; Battle of Stalingrad; Operation Bagration; Baltic Offensive; Battle of Königsberg
- Awards: Hero of the Soviet Union

Tulen Kabilov (Kazakh: Төлен Қабылов, Russian: Тулен Кабилов; 1917 – 10 April 1945) was a Kazakh Red Army sergeant and posthumous Hero of the Soviet Union. Kabilov was posthumously awarded the title for his actions during the Battle of Königsberg, where he threw an anti-tank grenade under a Ferdinand self-propelled gun but was killed in the explosion.

== Early life ==
Kabilov was born in 1917 in the village of Asy-Saga in Semirechye Oblast to a peasant family. He was orphaned at a young age and raised by his older sister. He received lower secondary education. After he graduated from courses in Almaty, Kabilov worked as a bookkeeper on the farm. He joined the Communist Party of the Soviet Union in 1940.

== World War II ==
Kabilov was drafted into the Red Army in 1942. He fought in combat from May 1942. Kabilov served with the 24th Guards Rifle Division's 72nd Guards Rifle Regiment. In December 1942, he fought in the battle to repulse the failed German relief operation at Stalingrad, Operation Winter Storm. During 1943 Kabilov fought in the battle to break through the Mius-Front and from September participated in the Battle of the Dnieper. Kabilov received the Medal "For Courage" on 23 March 1944. On 31 May 1944 he was awarded the Medal "For Courage" a second time. During the summer of 1944 Kabilov fought in the Šiauliai Offensive. In October he fought in the Battle of Memel. On 31 October he was awarded the Order of the Red Star.

In 1945 Kabilov was a squad leader in the regiment's 6th Rifle Company. In January he fought in the East Prussian Offensive. On 10 March, Kabilov was awarded the Order of Glory 3rd class for his actions on 22 January. He fought in the Battle of Königsberg, part of the East Pomeranian Offensive. On 8 April, during the storming of the city, Kabilov was reportedly one of the first to advance on the city from the south. In street fighting he reportedly destroyed a machine gun with a grenade. He also killed five German soldiers with a machine gun and another with a rifle butt. On 10 April in the area of Juditten, Kabilov helped repulse a counterattack of German Ferdinand self-propelled guns. He threw an anti-tank grenade under a self-propelled gun but was killed in the explosion. Kabilov was buried in a mass grave in Chkalovsk. On 19 April, Kabilov was awarded the title Hero of the Soviet Union and the Order of Lenin.

== Legacy ==
A collective farm in Almaty Region was named for Kabilov, as well as a secondary school in Asy-Saga. A street in Shelek was named for him. In 1968, an Atlantik-type refrigerated fishing trawler that operated out of Kaliningrad was named for Kabilov. In 1975, a street in Almaty was named for Kabilov. On the building of Kaliningrad School No. 14 there is a memorial plaque in honor of Kabilov.

== See also ==
- List of Kazakh Heroes of the Soviet Union
