= Presidential election =

Election of head of state who is President

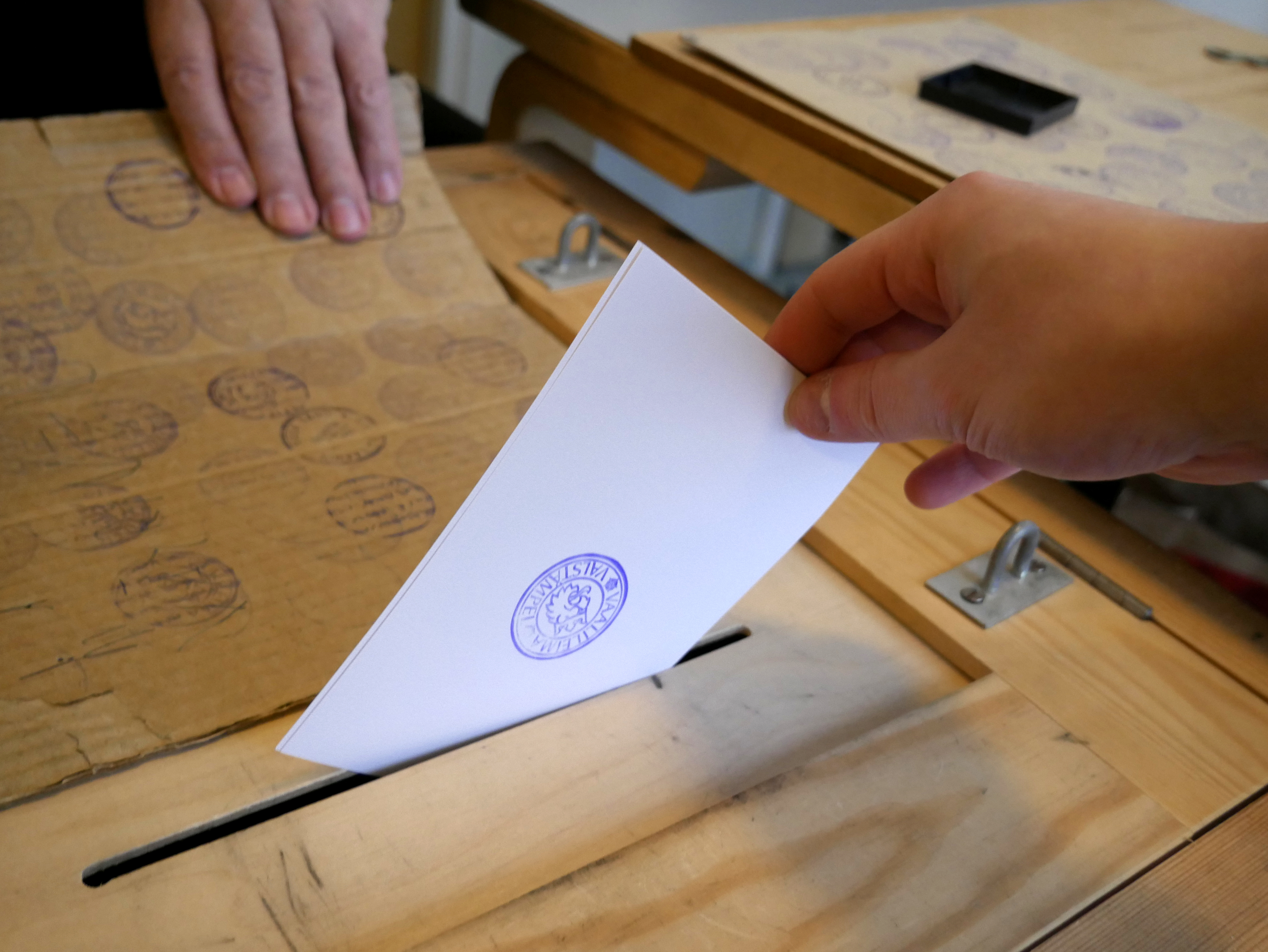
Ballot being dropped into a ballot box during the Finnish presidential election.

A presidential election is the election of any head of state whose official title is President.

== Elections by country ==
=== Albania ===
The president of Albania is elected by the Assembly of Albania who are elected by the Albanian public.

=== Chile ===
The president of Chile is elected by the Chilean people for a four-year term. Sitting presidents are not allowed to run for reelection, but former presidents may do so.

=== China ===
The president and vice president of China, are elected by the National People's Congress (NPC) on the nomination of the NPC Presidium. In practice, the presidential candidate is chosen through an informal process within the Chinese Communist Party (CCP), which is headed by the CCP general secretary. The power of the presidency is largely ceremonial and has no real power in China's political system, the vast majority of power stems from the president's position as General Secretary of the Chinese Communist Party and commander-in-chief of the military.

=== Czech Republic ===
The president of the Czech Republic is elected for a five-year term. Prior 2013, the election was indirect by the Parliament. The first direct election was held in 2013.

=== El Salvador ===
El Salvador elects its head of state – the president of El Salvador – directly through a fixed-date general election whose winner is decided by absolute majority. A presidential term in of 5 years and can't be re-election immediately, to become president again they have to wait one electoral period to run again. Current president of El Salvador is Nayib Bukele

=== France ===
The president of France is elected for a five-year (since 2002) term by popular vote.

=== Indonesia ===
The president and vice president of Indonesia are elected for a maximum of two five-year terms. Since 2004, presidential elections in Indonesia have been determined by popular vote.

=== Iran ===
The president of Iran is elected to a four-year term by the public. The first presidential election in Iran was held in 1980, following the Iranian Revolution of 1979 which resulted in the overthrow of the monarchy, although the president's power is second to the Supreme Leader.

=== Ireland ===
The president of Ireland is elected by the Irish people for a seven-year term.

=== Israel ===
The president of Israel is elected by the Knesset to a single seven-year term, though the role of the president is largely ceremonial as the real power of the country is in the hands of the prime minister.

=== Kazakhstan ===
The president of Kazakhstan is directly elected by popular vote for a single seven-year term. The first de-facto presidential election in Kazakhstan was held in 1991, during the dissolution of the Soviet Union, excluding the 1990 Kazakh presidential election where the president was indirectly elected by the Supreme Soviet of the Kazakh SSR.

=== Kyrgyzstan ===
The president of Kyrgyzstan undergoes a single term of six years.

=== Lithuania ===
The president of Lithuania is elected for a five-year term by the citizens of Lithuania.

=== Mexico ===
The president of Mexico is elected for a six-year term by the public. The first presidential election in Mexico was in 1934, although these weren't considered to have met international standards until 1994.

=== Palestine ===
The president of the Palestinian National Authority is the highest-ranking political position in the State of Palestine and is elected to a four-year term by the public.

=== Philippines ===
The president of the Philippines is the highest-ranking political position in the Philippines and is elected to a six-year term by the general populace. The most recent presidential election was held in 2022 which resulted in Bongbong Marcos being elected as the 17th president of the Philippines.

=== Poland ===
The first president of Second Polish Republic was Gabriel Narutowicz. In the Second Polish Republic, the president was elected by the Parliament, while in the Third Polish Republic the president is elected for a five-year term by the public. The most recent presidential election was the 2025 Polish presidential election. The next election will take place in 2030.

=== Russia ===
The president of Russia is elected for a six-year term by the public. The first presidential election in Russia was held in 1991.

=== Singapore ===
The president of Singapore is directly elected by popular vote, subject to potential candidates meeting stringent qualifications set out in the Constitution, in order to run for office.

=== South Africa ===
The president of South Africa is elected by the National Assembly who are elected by the South African public. The leader of the largest elected party in the National Assembly becomes president for a five-year term. The first non-racial elections were held in 1994 to mark the end of apartheid.

=== South Korea ===
South Korea has adopted a single, five-year presidential system. People over the age of 19 elect the president by direct voting. Voting for overseas Korean was first conducted during the 20th presidential election in 2017, and about 220,000 overseas Korean participated in the presidential election.

=== Switzerland ===
The president of the Swiss Confederation is elected every year for a one-year term by the Federal Assembly among the seven Federal Councillors who collectively form together the Head of State. Primus inter pares, the president has no powers over and above the other six Councillors and continues to head his or her department. Traditionally the duty rotates among the members in order of seniority and the previous year's vice president becomes president.

=== Republic of China ===
- Candidates for President of the Republic of China must be ROC citizens who have reached 40 years of age, has set their domicile in the ROC for not less than 15 years and lived in the free regions of the ROC for not less than 6 consecutive months. Naturalised citizens, residents of Hong Kong, Macau or the People's Republic of China, soldiers and election officials are not eligible.

=== Tanzania ===
The president of Tanzania is elected by general vote every five years. As of 2015, 24,001,134 people in Tanzania were registered to vote. Voters are registered upon completion of a Biometric Voters Register kit. The current president is John Magufuli.

=== Turkey ===
The president of Turkey is elected for a maximum of two five-year terms. Prior to 2014, the election was indirect by the Parliament. Since 2014, presidential elections in Turkey have been determined by popular vote.

=== Uzbekistan ===
President is elected by popular vote nationwide

Term: 7 years

Max: 2 consecutive terms

Candidate must be 35+, citizen, 10 years residence, fluent in Uzbek

Only registered political parties can nominate candidates

To win: over 50% of votes

If no majority → runoff between top 2

Minimum 33% voter turnout required

=== Ukraine ===
The president of Ukraine is elected for a five-year term by the public. The first presidential election in Ukraine was held in 1991 following the dissolution of the Soviet Union.

=== United States ===
The United States has elections on the state and local levels. The Electoral College is the constitutional body that elects the president, and voters actually vote for the members of the Electoral College at the state level. In the U.S., the presidential elections at the state-level decide which people shall become members of the Electoral College for each state, and those members of the Electoral College in turn cast their votes for the presidential candidates. The first recorded Electoral College presidential election in the United States was in 1788−1789, in which George Washington won.

=== Venezuela ===
The president of Venezuela is elected by the public to a six-year term.

== List of presidential elections ==
- Elections in Albania
- Elections in Argentina
- Elections in Belarus
- Elections in Brazil
- Elections in Estonia
- Elections in El Salvador
- Elections in Finland
- Elections in France
- Elections in Germany
- Elections in Hungary
- Elections in India
- Elections in Iceland
- Elections in Indonesia
- Elections in Iran
- Elections in the Republic of Ireland
- Elections in Israel
- Elections in Italy
- Elections in Mexico
- Elections in Nigeria
- Elections in the Palestinian National Authority
- Elections in the Philippines
- Elections in Poland
- Elections in Portugal
- Elections in Russia
- Elections in South Africa
- Elections in South Korea
- Elections in Spain
- Elections in Taiwan
- Elections in Turkey
- Elections in Ukraine
- Elections in the United States
- Elections in Venezuela

== See also ==
- President (government title)
- Who is elected

== Related articles ==
- Head of state
- Presidential elections in France
- Elections in Algeria
- Elections in the Democratic Republic of the Congo
- United States presidential election
- Elections by country
