= Kayrgali Ismagulov =

Kayrgali "Konstantin" Ismagulov
- Қайырғали Смағұлов
- Born: 5 September 1919; Kairshakhty village, Alash–Orda
- Died: 23 October 1993 (aged 74); Atyrau, Kazakhstan
- Military career
- Allegiance: Soviet Union
- Branch: Red Army
- Service years: 1939–1946
- Rank: junior lieutenant
- Conflicts: World War II
- Awards: Hero of the Soviet Union

Kayrgali "Konstantin" Ivanovich Ismagulov (Russian: Кайыргали (Константин) Иванович Исмагулов, Kazakh: Қайырғали Смағұлов; 5 September 1919 — 23 October 1993) was a Kazakh officer in the Red Army during World War II who led a group of paratroopers in the Kerch–Eltigen landing and was awarded the title Hero of the Soviet Union.

== See also ==
- List of Kazakh Heroes of the Soviet Union
