= Pavel Antseborenko =

Soviet soldier (1925–1944)

Pavel Afanasevich Antseborenko
- Born: 1925; Maidanivka, Hlobynskyi Raion, Poltava Oblast, Ukrainian SSR
- Died: 20 August 1944 (aged 18–19); Hargle, Estonia
- Burial place: Valga, Estonia
- Military career
- Allegiance: Soviet Union
- Branch: Red Army
- Service years: 1941–1943
- Rank: Private
- Unit: 2nd Shock Army
- Conflicts: Operation Bagration
- Awards: Hero of the Soviet Union

Pavel Afanasevich Antseborenko (Russian: Павел Афанасьевич Анцеборенко; Ukrainian: Павел Афанасьевич Анцеборенко; 1925 – 20 August 1944) was a Soviet soldier who was awarded the title of Hero of the Soviet Union posthumously in 1944 when he was killed during the defense of a village in modern-day Estonia during Operation Bagration.

== Biography ==
=== Early life ===
Antseborenko was born into a peasant family near Poltava in the Ukrainian SSR in 1925. However, his parents were killed in 1933 during collectivization. He was therefore brought up in a kolkhoz. In 1939, he graduated from high school in Glushki and worked in a factory until the outbreak of war in 1941.

=== Eastern Front (World War II) ===
He joined the Red Army upon the outbreak of war in September 1941 as a volunteer rather than a conscript. He fought his first combat engagement in October 1941 and was assigned to the 2nd Shock Army whose job it was to re-capture the Baltic States. During combat he distinguished himself and received the Order of Lenin.

=== Death and award ===
On August 20, 1944, while patrolling in the village of Hargle, in Estonia, seven Soviet soldiers including Antseborenko encountered a much larger group of Wehrmacht forces and were surrounded. A firefight ensued in which Antseborenko killed eight enemy soldiers and allowed his comrades to escape. Rather than be taken prisoner, he walked towards the German soldiers with a hand grenade, which he detonated, killing himself and several enemy soldiers. On 24 March 1945, he was awarded the title of Hero of the Soviet Union "for bravery and courage shown in battle with German invaders."

== Posthumous honours ==
In Lüllemäe, in modern-day Estonia, there is a school named after him.
