= Kazakh Soviet Socialist Republic =

Soviet republic from 1936 to 1991

Coordinates: 48°N 68°E

Kazakh Soviet Socialist Republic Қазақ Советтік Социалистік Республикасы (Kazakh) Казахская Советская Социалистическая Республика (Russian)
- 1936–1991
- Flag (1953–1991) State emblem (1978–1991)
- Motto: Барлық елдердің пролетарлары, бірігіңдер! "Barlyq elderdıñ proletarlary, bırıgıñder" "Proletarians of all countries, unite!"
- Anthem: Қазақ Советтік Социалистік Республикасының мемлекеттік гимны "Qazaq Sovettık Socialistık Respublikasynyñ memlekettık gimny" "State Anthem of the Kazakh Soviet Socialist Republic"
- Location of Kazakhstan (red) within the Soviet Union
- Status: 1936–1990: Union Republic of the Soviet Union; 1990–1991: Union Republic with priority of the Kazakh legislation
- Capital: Alma-Ata
- Largest cities: Karaganda; Pavlodar; Shymkent; Semipalatinsk; Nikolsk
- Official languages: Kazakh · Russian
- Minority languages: Uzbek · Uyghur · Tatar · Kyrgyz · Azerbaijani · Korean · German · Ukrainian
- Religion: State atheism
- Demonyms: Kazakh; Soviet
- Government: Communist state (1936–1990); Presidential republic (1990–1991)
- First Secretary
  - 1936–1938 (first): Levon Mirzoyan
  - 1991 (last): Nursultan Nazarbayev
- Head of state
  - 1936–1937 (first): Uzakbai Kulymbetov
  - 1990 (last): Nursultan Nazarbayev
- Head of government
  - 1936–1937 (first): Uraz Isayev
  - 1991 (Last): Sergey Tereshchenko
- Legislature: Supreme Soviet
- History
  - Elevation to a Union Republic: 5 December 1936–1991
  - Jeltoqsan riots: 16 December 1986
  - Sovereignty declared: 25 October 1990
  - Renamed to the Republic of Kazakhstan: 10 December 1991
  - Independence declared: 16 December 1991
  - Kazakhstan’s international recognition (dissolution of the Soviet Union): 26 December 1991

Population
  - 1990 estimate: 17,154,054
  - 1989 census: 16,536,511 (4th)
- GDP (PPP): 1990 estimate
  - Total: $135.07 billion
  - Per capita: $7,847.2
- HDI (1991): 0.684 medium
- Currency: Soviet rouble (Rbl) (SUR)
- Time zone: (UTC+4 to +6)
- Calling code: +7 31/32/330/33622
- ISO 3166 code: SU
- Internet TLD: .su
| Preceded by | Succeeded by |
| Kazakh ASSR | Kazakhstan |
- Today part of: Kazakhstan

The Kazakh Soviet Socialist Republic, (Note: The Russian-language name for the republic was Казахская Советская Социалистическая Республика. The Kazakh alphabet has changed several times in the past century and the rendering of the republic's name in Kazakh changed as well: 1936–1937: Qazaqtьꞑ Soʙetti Sotsijaldь Respuvʙlijkasь (1929 Latin script); 1937–1939: Qazaqtьꞑ Soʙetti Sotsijalistik Respuvʙlijkasь (1929 Latin script); 1939–1941: Qazaqtьꞑ Sovettj Sotsialistjk Respuʙlikasь (1938 Latin script); 1941–c.1970: Қазақтың Советтік Социалистік Республикасы (1940 Cyrillic script); c.1970–1991: Қазақ Советтік Социалистік Республикасы (1940 Cyrillic script); 1991: Қазақ Кеңестік Социалистік Республикасы (1940 Cyrillic script); the loanword sovettık (советтік) was replaced with keñestık (кеңестік).) also known as Soviet Kazakhstan, the Kazakh SSR, KSSR, or simply Kazakhstan, was one of the constituent republics of the Soviet Union (USSR) from 1936 to 1991. Being located in northern Central Asia, the Kazakh SSR was created on 5 December 1936 from the erstwhile Kazakh ASSR, which was an autonomous republic of the Russian SFSR. It shared borders with its fellow Soviet republics of Russia, Kyrgyzstan, Turkmenistan and Uzbekistan, while also sharing an international border with the People's Republic of China.

At 2,717,300 square kilometres (1,049,200 sq mi) in area, it was the second-largest republic in the USSR, after the Russian SFSR. Its capital was Alma-Ata (today known as Almaty). During its existence as a Soviet Socialist Republic, it was ruled by the Communist Party of the Kazakh SSR (QKP). It was the most economically advanced of the central Asian Soviet Republics, having a significant base in mineral extraction and agriculture.

On 25 October 1990, the Supreme Soviet of the Kazakh SSR declared its sovereignty on its soil. QKP first secretary Nursultan Nazarbayev was elected president in April of that year – a role he remained in until 2019. On 17 March 1991, the Kazakh SSR accepted the New Union Treaty with 95% of citizens voting in favor.

The Kazakh SSR was renamed the Republic of Kazakhstan on 10 December 1991, which declared its independence six days later, as the last republic to secede from the USSR on 16 December 1991. The Soviet Union was officially dissolved on 26 December 1991 by the Soviet of the Republics. The Republic of Kazakhstan, the legal successor to the Kazakh SSR, was admitted to the United Nations on 2 March 1992.

== Name ==
The republic was named after the Kazakh people, a Turkic ethnic group native to Central Asia who formed the majority in the Kazakh SSR's territory. Historically, the Kazakhs were nomads who created a powerful khanate in the region before being defeated and annexed by the Russian Empire.

== History ==
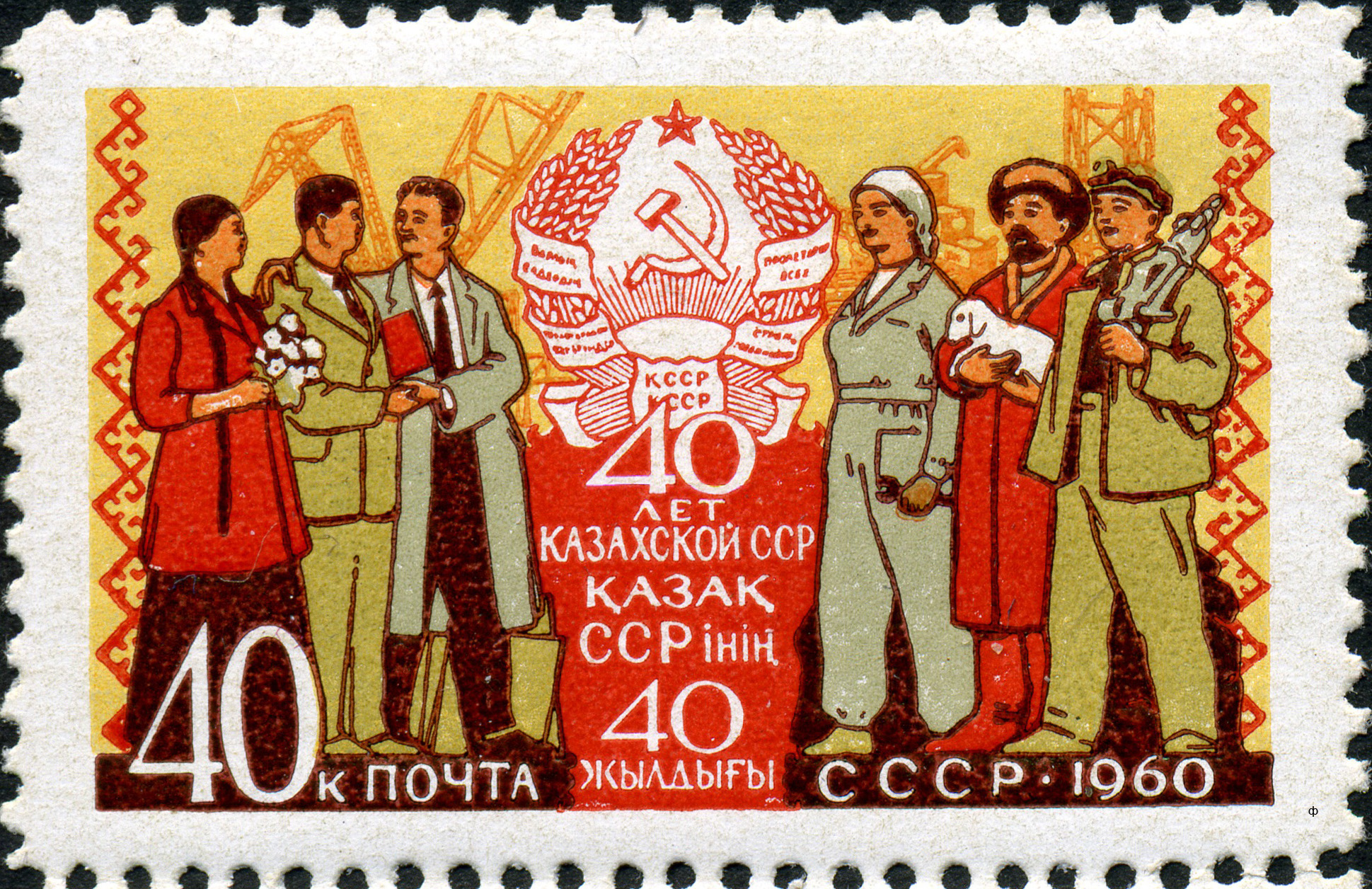
Stamp marking the Kazakh SSR's 40th anniversary

Established on 26 August 1920, it was initially called Kirghiz ASSR (Kirghiz Autonomous Soviet Socialist Republic) and was a part of the Russian SFSR. On 15–19 April 1925, it was renamed Kazak ASSR (subsequently Kazakh ASSR) and on 5 December 1936 it was elevated to the status of a Union-level republic, Kazakh Soviet Socialist Republic.

In September 1920, the Ninth Soviet Congress of Turkestan called for the deportation of illegal settler colonists in the Northern parts of the country. The proposed land reform began in 1921 and lasted until 1927, targeting Russian settlers, Ukrainians and Cossacks in the region and from 1920 to 1922, Kazakhstan's Russian population dropped from approximately 2.7 to 2.2 million. A further 15,000 Cossack settler colonists were deported between 1920 and 1921 as part of the process of returning control and sovereignty of land to the Kazakhs.

On 19 February 1925, Filipp Goloshchyokin was appointed First Secretary of the Communist Party in the newly created Kazakh Autonomous Socialist Soviet Republic. From 1925 to 1933 he ran the Kazakh ASSR with an iron grip, surprisingly with virtually zero interference from Moscow. He played a prominent part in the construction of the Turkestan-Siberia railway, which was constructed to open up Kazakhstan's mineral wealth.

After Joseph Stalin ordered the forced collectivization of agriculture throughout the Soviet Union, Goloshchyokin ordered that Kazakhstan's largely nomadic population was to be settled in collectivized farms. This, alongside the disastrous agricultural and scientific policies of Trofim Lysenko, eventually culminated in the deadly Kazakh famine of 1930–1933 in Kazakhstan which killed between 1 and 2 million people.

In 1937 the first major deportation of an ethnic group in the Soviet Union began, with the removal of the Korean population from the Russian Far East to Kazakhstan. Over 170,000 people were forcibly relocated to the Kazakh and Uzbek SSRs.

Kazakhstani Korean scholar German Kim assumes that one of the reasons for this deportation may have been Stalin's intent to oppress ethnic minorities that could have posed a threat to his socialist system or he may have intended to consolidate the border regions with China and Japan by using them as political bargaining chips. Additionally, historian Kim points out that 1.7 million people perished in the Kazakh famine of 1931–1933, while an additional one million people fled from the Republic, causing a labour shortage in that area, which Stalin sought to compensate by deporting other ethnicities there.

Over one million political prisoners from various parts of the Soviet Union passed through the Karaganda Corrective Labor Camp (Karlag) between 1931 and 1959, with an unknown number of deaths. The Great Purge affected many Kazakh families, sometimes even decimating entire lineages.

Major improvements in literacy were recorded, by the 1960s nearly 97% of the country was literate with minimal disparity between male and female citizens. Various forms of technical and research-oriented education were provided to the citizens, which led to the fading away of the traditionalist culture systems.

During the industrialization drives ordered by Joseph Stalin and the shift of key industries from the Eastern Front (World War II), Kazakhstan developed many oil wells, mines, steel plants and mineral refineries. However, the focus on heavy industry stunted the development of light industries that could manufacture consumer goods. In 1949, the Turkestan–Siberia Railway was constructed in the Kazakh SSR which linked the country to Russia via rail. Thousands of kilometers of road were constructed throughout the country, linking the previously disconnected parts of the country and facilitating development. Many Kazakhs served with distinction in the Great Patriotic War, with Bauyrzhan Momyshuly, Manshuk Mametova and Sadyk Abdujabbarov becoming household names. (see List of Kazakh Heroes of the Soviet Union)

During the 1950s and 1960s, Soviet citizens were urged to settle in the Virgin Lands of the Kazakh Soviet Socialist Republic. This was initiated by Nikita Khrushchev to utilize potential land for cultivation and to boost agricultural production. From the 1960s onwards, many manufacturing units for chemicals, defense equipment and alloys sprung up throughout the country. Agriculture soon became an important part of the economy, with wheat, beetroot, rice and cotton being grown in the country.

The Baikonur Cosmodrome was built in the 1950s and served as a launchpad for the ambitious Soviet space program, which intensely competed with the Americans' space efforts. Baikonur was the launch site of several landmark operations, launching the pivotal missions involving Sputnik 1, Yuri Gagarin, Valentina Tereshkova and Toktar Aubakirov.

During the 22-year tenure of Dinmukhamed Kunaev, the Kazakh SSR saw further advancements in economic prosperity, energy production and industrialization. He enjoyed a strong working relationship with Leonid Brezhnev, which saw him rise to prominence in the Soviet Politburo. Kunaev was extremely popular among the people due to his growth-oriented policies and improvements in living standards. Many people in modern-day Kazakhstan express fondness for his premiership.

The immigration policies of the USSR led to a drastic influx of Russians, eventually skewing the ethnic composition of the republic. With non-Kazakhs becoming the majority, the use of the Kazakh language declined and would only see a revival after the dissolution of the USSR. The Russian language would become the Lingua franca and dominant language. Other immigrant nationalities in the SSR included Ukrainians, Germans, Kyrgyz, Belarusians, Koreans, Tatars, and Uyghurs. Kazakhs mixed well with the immigrants and helped create an inclusive multi-ethnic state. The Kazakh SSR had the highest concentration of Germans in the entire country. Post Kazakh independence, many of these immigrants have chosen to emigrate to countries like Russia, Germany and Ukraine.

=== Dissolution ===
In 1986, the dismissal of Dinmukhamed Kunaev, the First Secretary of the Communist Party of Kazakhstan by the last Soviet general secretary, Mikhail Gorbachev, proved to be highly controversial. Riots would break out for four days between 16 and 19 December 1986 [now known as Jeltoqsan] by student demonstrators in Brezhnev Square in the capital city, Alma-Ata. The replacement of Konayev, who was very popular, by Gennady Kolbin, an ethnic Russian, would stoke major discontent among the native population. 168–200 civilians were killed in the uprising. The events then spilled over to other prominent cities such as Shymkent, Pavlodar, Karaganda and Taldykorgan.

On 25 March 1990, Kazakhstan held its first elections with Nursultan Nazarbayev, the chairman of the Supreme Soviet elected as its first president. Later that year on 25 October, it then declared sovereignty. The republic participated in a referendum to preserve the union in a different entity with 94.1% voting in favour. It did not happen when hardline communists in Moscow took control of the government in August. Nazarbayev then condemned the failed coup and prepared to declare independence.

As a result of those events, the Kazakh SSR was renamed to the Republic of Kazakhstan on 10 December 1991. It declared independence on 16 December (the fifth anniversary of Jeltoqsan), becoming the last Soviet constituency to secede. Its capital was the site of the Alma-Ata Protocol on 21 December 1991 that dissolved the Soviet Union and formed the Commonwealth of Independent States in its place, which Kazakhstan promptly joined. The Soviet Union officially ceased to exist as a sovereign state on 26 December 1991 and Kazakhstan became an internationally recognized independent state. On 28 January 1993, the new Constitution of Kazakhstan was officially adopted.

== Population dynamics ==
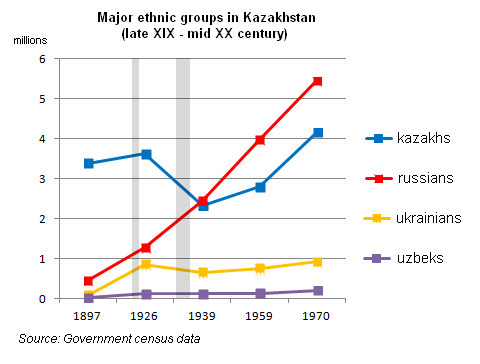
Demographics of Kazakhstan from 1897 to 1970, with major ethnic groups. Famines of the 1920s and 1930s are marked with shades.

According to the 1897 census, the earliest census taken in the region, Kazakhs constituted 81.7% of the total population (3,392,751 people) within the territory of contemporary Kazakhstan. The Russian population in Kazakhstan was 454,402, or 10.95% of total population; there were 79,573 Ukrainians (1.91%); 55,984 Tatars (1.34%); 55,815 Uyghurs (1.34%); 29,564 Uzbeks (0.7%); 11,911 Moldovans (0.28%); 4,888 Dungans (0.11%); 2,883 Turkmens; 2,613 Germans; 2,528 Bashkirs; 1,651 Jews; and 1,254 Poles. In later years, due to deportations and societal engineering, many Belarusians, Koryo-saram, Chechens and Kalmyks were brought to the country.

Ethnic Composition of Kazakhstan (census data)
| Nationality | 1926 | 1939 | 1959 | 1970 | 1979 | 1989 |
|---|---|---|---|---|---|---|
| Kazakh | 58.5 | 37.8 | 30.0 | 32.6 | 36.0 | 40.1 |
| Russian | 18.0 | 40.2 | 42.7 | 42.4 | 40.8 | 37.4 |
| Ukrainian | 13.88 | 10.7 | 8.2 | 7.2 | 6.1 | 5.4 |
| Belarusian | 0.51 | 1.2 | 1.5 | 1.2 | 1.1 | 0.8 |
| German | 0.82 | 1.50 | 7.1 | 6.6 | 6.1 | 5.8 |
| Tatar | 1.29 | 1.76 | 2.1 | 2.2 | 2.1 | 2.0 |
| Uzbek | 2.09 | 1.96 | 1.5 | 1.7 | 1.8 | 2.0 |
| Uyghur | 1.01 | 0.58 | 0.6 | 0.9 | 1.0 | 1.1 |
| Korean | | | 0.8 | 0.6 | 0.6 | 0.6 |

=== Famines ===
The most significant factors that shaped the ethnic composition of the population of Kazakhstan were the 1920s and 1930s famines. According to different estimates of the effects of the Kazakh famine of 1930–1933, up to 40% of ethnic Kazakhs either died of starvation or fled the territory. Official government census data report the contraction of Kazakh population from 3.6 million in 1926 to 2.3 million in 1939. The deadly effects of the famines are still remembered in now independent Kazakhstan, with national remembrances and solidarity campaigns gaining traction among the national community.

== Economy ==
Before Soviet times, there was barely any industry or large-scale agriculture in the country. Most residents were either steppe nomads or pastoralists. While the USSR managed to create thriving industries and brought agriculture to Kazakhstan, these developments came at great costs. Forced collectivization of farms, bureaucratic restrictions, highly centralized economic planning and an excessive focus on heavy industry caused both structural and workforce issues for the Kazakh economy.

Stalin's push for greater industrialization throughout the Soviet Union was heeded without opposition in the country. During his leadership, Central Asia experienced rapid yet chaotic industrial growth and agricultural restructuring, including the Kazakh SSR. In the 1930s and 1940s, major investments were poured into the Kazakh SSR to build transportation networks to link the country via road and rail. Many industrial manufacturing plants were built throughout the country, pertaining to metallurgy, oil and gas production, chemical processing, defense equipment and wheat processing. Upon the start of the Second World War, many large factories located on the Eastern Front (World War II) were shifted to the Kazakh SSR, to protect the USSR's industrial lifelines. This would prove vital for the USSR's victory as well as for the Kazakh economy. The Semipalatinsk Nuclear Test Site and Baikonur Cosmodrome were also built here, with Baikonur being the iconic launch site for many prominent Soviet space explorations.

After the war, the Virgin Lands Campaign was started in 1953. This was led by Nikita Khrushchev, with the goal of developing the previously uncultivated lands of the republic and helping to boost Soviet agricultural yields. However, since it did not work as promised, the campaign was eventually abandoned in the 1960s. The Kazakh SSR did eventually become a key regional producer of wheat, beet and cotton.

The Kazakh SSR arguably saw its best days under Dinmukhamed Kunaev, who not only brought significant economic expansion but also managed to foster political autonomy from Moscow. He oversaw a rapid expansion in the country's material prosperity, industrial capacity and social status. The Kazakh SSR became an efficient exporter of valuable raw and processed goods, eventually becoming the third largest economy of the USSR. During the tumultuous era of Gorbachev's policies of Perestroika and Glasnost, the economy stagnated and left many citizens disappointed. The economic discontent, coupled with growing nationalism among the elites and youth, would lead to the downfall of Soviet rule in Kazakhstan.

== Culture ==
In the early days of the Soviet Union, Kazakh cultural autonomy was developed in line with Vladimir Lenin's policy of Korenizatsiia. The Latin script was adapted for the Kazakh language and secular developments in national culture were encouraged, This brief period of cultural autonomy was short-lived however, as Stalin ordered a reversal of the policy and enforced the adoption of the Cyrillic script for all Turkic languages spoken in the country. This was accompanied by the propagation of internationalism through the cultural revolution in the Soviet Union, which aimed to build a strong socialist society on the foundation of scientific Marxism–Leninism. Beginning in 1937, the Soviet Government began a series of forced deportations of ethnic minorities, such as Soviet Koreans, the Volga Germans and various other minorities to the Kazakh SSR, a programme that ended only with Stalin's death in 1953.

After the Stalinist era, Nikita Khrushchev's renewed efforts to reinvigorate internationalism and further weaken Kazakh culture were controversial in the Kazakh SSR. During the stewardship of Dinmukhamed Kunaev, indigenous culture was promoted and national autonomy was restored once again. The culture of the Kazakh SSR was shaped by both native culture and the ever-changing Soviet ideology, creating an eclectic mix of national pride and socialist internationalism. In the early days, there were several instances of tensions between Russians and Kazakhs, which would eventually fade away. In the coming years, Kazakhstan was depicted as the 'promised land' which benefitted immensely from Soviet friendship and cooperation.
