= Nikolai Artamonov (pilot) =

- Николай Семёнович Артамонов
- Born: 21 May 1920
- Died: 26 March 1945 (aged 24)
- Military career
- Allegiance: Soviet Union
- Branch: Soviet Air Force
- Service years: 1941–1945
- Rank: Captain
- Conflicts: World War II
- Awards: Hero of the Soviet Union

Nikolai Semyonovich Artamonov (Russian: Николай Семёнович Артамонов; 21 May 1920 – 26 March 1945) was a Soviet fighter pilot who became a flying ace during World War II. Awarded the title Hero of the Soviet Union on 19 August 1944 for his initial victories, by the end of the war he reached a tally of 28 solo and nine shared shootdowns.
