= Ramil Abdershin =

Red Army sergeant

- Native name: Рамил Хәйрулла улы Габдершин
- Born: November 1925; Novomusino village, Bashkir ASSR, USSR
- Died: 8 November 1943 (aged 17–18) Pereiaslav-Khmelnytskyi Raion, USSR
- Allegiance: Soviet Union
- Branch: Red Army
- Service years: 1943
- Rank: Sergeant
- Conflicts: World War II (DOW)
- Awards: Hero of the Soviet Union

Ramil Khayrullaevich Abdrshin (Tatar: Рамил Хәйрулла улы Габдершин, Russian: Рамиль Хайруллаевич Абдршин; 8 November 1925 — 8 November 1943) was a sergeant in the Red Army who was posthumously awarded the title Hero of the Soviet Union.

== Early life ==
Abdrshin was born in November 1925 to a Volga Tatar peasant family in Novomusino village. He was a member of the Komsomol. After graduating from ten grades of school he attended the Kattakurgan Pedagogical School which he graduated from in 1942 before working at a schoolteacher in that town.

== World War II ==
He was drafted into the Red Army in February 1943, and in March he was sent to the Voronezh Front. He distinguished himself in the Dnieper crossing. As commander of the 1st squad in the 1st Motorized Rifle Battalion of the 69th Mechanized brigade, ge led his squad in crossing the river on homemade rafts on the night of 22 September 1943. He continued to distinguish himself in the battles for various villages in the Ukrainian SSR. After being badly wounded on 11 October 1943 while repelling an enemy counterattack he was hospitalized, but he died of his wounds on 8 November 1943. On 17 November 1943 he was awarded the title Hero of the Soviet Union.
