= Mansur Abdullin =

- Мансур Һидият улы Габдуллин
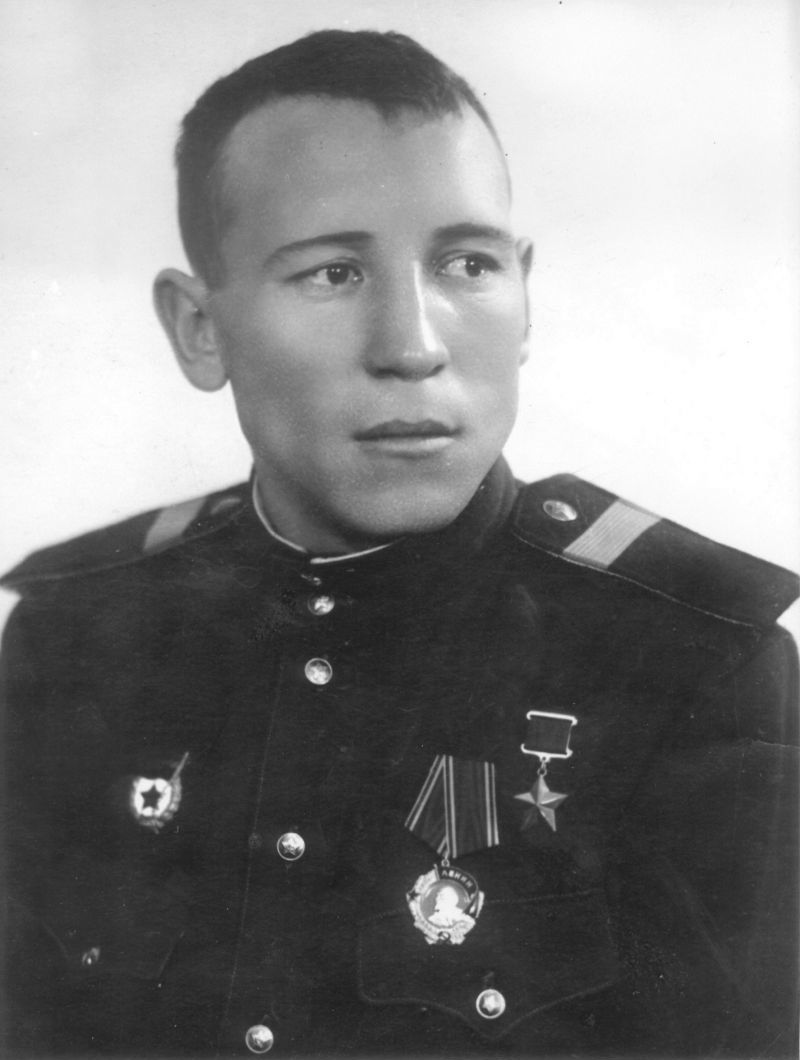
- Born: 15 September 1919 either Kirgiz-Miyaki or Sterlibashevo, Ufa Governorate, RSFSR (Note: Some sources differ as to if he was born in Kirgiz-Miyaki or Sterlibashevo)
- Died: 8 June 1996 (aged 76); Ufa, Bashkortostan, Russia
- Military career
- Allegiance: Soviet Union
- Branch: Red Army
- Service years: 1938–1944
- Rank: Lieutenant
- Unit: 167th Guards Light Artillery Regiment
- Conflicts: World War II
- Awards: Hero of the Soviet Union

Mansur Idiatovich Abdullin (Russian: Мансур Идиатович Абдуллин, Tatar: Мансур Һидият улы Габдуллин; 15 September 1919 — 8 June 1996) was a soldier in the Red Army who was awarded the title Hero of the Soviet Union for destroying enemy tanks in the battles for Kursk.

== Early life ==
Mansur Abdullin was born on 15 September 1919 in what is now Bashkortostan to a Tatar peasant family. In 1927 he entered the Kirghiz-Miyakinsky secondary school, and later worked on a local collective farm . In 1937, he moved to the Uzbek SSR, where he began working as a teacher in the Arkabesh in Leninsk until he was drafted into the Red Army in 1938.

== World War II ==
Abdullin was deployed to the front of World War II in 1941. After being wounded in autumn he was sent to the hospital to recover and returned to combat in July 1942. He fought on the Western, Central, 2nd Belorussian, and 1st Belorussian fronts, taking part in the battles for Smolensk, Stalingrad, and Kursk.

In July 1943 Abdullin distinguished himself in battle, where he was a gun commander in the 167th Guards Light Artillery Regiment. He was nominated for the title Hero of the Soviet Union on 12 July 1942 for destroying eight enemy tanks in Molotychi while under heavy enemy fire. He was badly wounded by shell fragments during the engagement. On 7 August 1943 he was awarded the title Hero of the Soviet Union, but retired from combat and entered the reserve with the rank of lieutenant in October 1944 due to the extent of his injuries.

== Later life ==
From 1944 to 1945 he studied at the Party School of the Bashkir Regional Committee of the Communist Party, and he became a member of the Communist Party in 1945. In 1949 he graduated from the Bashkir Pedagogical Institute. After that, he worked as the director of secondary school No. 1 in the village of Sterlibashevo, and from 1956 - the head of the Sterlibashevsky Regional School. He then moved to Ufa, where in 1962 he became the director of secondary school No. 109, and then in 1976 he became the director of boarding school No. 2. He died on 8 June 1996 and was buried in the Ufa Southern Cemetery.
