= Karakoz Abdaliev =

Soviet Red Army lieutenant (1908–1943)

- Born: 1908; Chimkent Uyezd, Syr-Darya Oblast, Russian Turkestan, Russian Empire
- Died: 22 October 1943 (aged 34–35) near Melitopol, Ukrainian SSR
- Burial place: south of Melitopol, Ukraine
- Military career
- Allegiance: Soviet Union
- Branch: Red Army
- Service years: 1941–1943
- Rank: Lieutenant
- Unit: 126th Rifle Division
- Conflicts: World War II; Battle of the Dnieper; Melitopol Offensive
- Awards: Hero of the Soviet Union

Karakoz Abdaliev (Russian: Каракозы Абдалиев (1908 – 22 October 1943) was a Soviet soldier who was awarded the title of Hero of the Soviet Union posthumously in 1943 for his actions during the Battle of the Dnieper.

Abdaliev was born in a peasant family of Kazakh ethnicity in Chimkent Uyezd, Syr-Darya Oblast, in Russian Turkestan. He was drafted into the Soviet military and served as a machine gunner. He distinguished himself in combat during the Soviet advance against Nazi Germany, particularly in battles where his actions significantly contributed to the success of Soviet forces. In 1943, during a critical engagement, he was killed in action after demonstrating extraordinary courage and self-sacrifice. He was reported to have killed 72 German soldiers and destroyed two tanks. In recognition of his heroism, he was awarded the Soviet Union's highest military honor.

== Early life ==
Abdalev was born in a peasant family of Kazakh ethnicity in Chimkent Uyezd, Syr-Darya Oblast, in Russian Turkestan in the Russian Empire (present-day Tole Bi District, Kazakhstan) in 1908. He attended school and graduated in 1924, after the Russian Revolution of 1917. From 1924 until 1941 he worked on the Taldybulak Kolkhoz.

== Eastern Front (World War II) ==
He joined the Communist Party of the Soviet Union in 1940, and was called up from the Kazakh SSR in 1941. He fought on the Eastern Front (World War II) from 1942. Abdaliev became a lieutenant and platoon leader in the 690th Rifle Regiment of the 126th Rifle Division, part of the 51st Army.

== Death and award ==
Abdaliev fought in the Battle of the Dnieper in late 1943. In fighting near Melitopol, in modern-day Ukraine, on 21–22 October 1943 he was reported by the Presidium of the Communist Party of the Soviet Union to have cleared 17 houses occupied by the Wehrmacht in addition to having destroyed 23 machine-gun posts, two tanks and killed more than 72 German soldiers. However, he was killed in the fighting and posthumously awarded the title of Hero of the Soviet Union and the Order of Lenin for "exemplary performance of command assignments at the front against the Nazi invaders and for displaying courage and heroism". He was buried south of Melitopol.

== Posthumous honours ==
In addition to being awarded the title Hero of the Soviet Union, a bust of him was erected in Fogolevo, South Kazakhstan Province. A street is named after him in Melitopol, with a plaque remembering his achievements.

== See also ==
- Eastern Front (World War II)
- 51st Army (Russia)
