= List of Kazakh Heroes of the Soviet Union =

The † (dagger) indicates that the title was awarded posthumously to a soldier killed in action. This is a list of Heroes that were ethnic Kazakhs, not Russians that lived in the Kazakh SSR, repressed peoples deported to Kazakhstan, etc.

== Military Personnel ==
Name	Unit	Rank	Date of award	Notes	References
Karakoz Abdaliev	690th Rifle Regiment	Lieutenant	1 November 1943 †	Killed in action 22 October 1943	
Nurken Abdirov	808th Attack Aviation Regiment	Sergeant	31 March 1943 †	Executed a "fire taran" attack by ramming his damaged plane into a German tank on 19 December 1942	
Mikhail Abdolov	111th Independent Reconnaissance Company	Senior Sergeant	24 March 1945	—	
Sadyk Abdujabbarov	219th Guards Rifle Regiment	Senior Lieutenant	22 July 1944	—	
Mukatai Abeulov	152nd Guards Anti-Tank Artillery Regiment	Guards Cossack	28 April 1945 †	Killed in action on 16 December 1944	
Anuar Abutalipov	13th Guards Airborne Regiment	Private	24 March 1945	—	
Izgutty Aitykov	158th Guards Rifle Regiment	Guard Sergeant-Major	22 July 1944	Died of wounds three days after awarding on 25 July 1944	
Uzarak Akbauov	214th Guards Infantry Regiment	Guard Captain	17 October 1943	—	
Abylai Alimbetov	303rd Infantry Regiment	Sergeant	30 October 1943	—	
Seytkasim Ashirov	332th Infantry Regiment	Staff Sergeant	24 March 1945	—	
Koigeldy Aukhadiev	10th Guards Rifle Regiment	Guard Junior Sergeant	16 October 1943 †	Killed in action 29 September 1943	
Tulebay Azhimov	862th Infantry Regiment	Sergeant	23 September 1944	—	
Matai Baisov	342th Infantry Regiment	Red Army man	10 January 1944 †	Killed in action 11 November 1943	
Sultan Baimagambetov	147th Infantry Regiment	Staff Sergeant	21 February 1944 †	Killed in action on 25 July 1943	
Makhash Balmagambetov	73rd Guards Rifle Division	Guard Staff Sergeant	22 February 1944	—	
Imangali Baltabanov	289th Infantry Regiment	Sergeant	10 April 1945 †	Killed in action on 26 February 1945	
Musa Baymuhanov	538th Infantry Regiment	Junior Lieutenant	10 April 1945 †	Killed in action on 18 March 1945	
Madi Begenov	619th Infantry Regiment	Sergeant	19 March 1944 †	Killed in action on 1 November 1943	
Serikqazi Bekbosinov	300th Guards Infantry Regiment	Staff Sergeant	21 July 1944	—	
Zakariya Belimbaev	18th Independent Pontoon Battalion	Red Army man	17 October 1943	—	
Talgat Bigeldinov	144th Guards Ground Attack Aviation Regiment	General-Major of Aviation	26 October 1944; 27 June 1945	Only Kazakh soldier twice awarded title	
Malkejdar Bukenbaev	1081st Infantry Regiment	Lieutenant	27 February 1945	—	
Amantai Daulitbekov	180th Anti-Tank Artillery Regiment	Staff Sergeant	24 December 1943	Killed in action on 9 July 1943	
Lesbek Dzholdasov	1077th Infantry Regiment	Lieutenant	24 March 1945	—	
Kilmash Dzumaliev	267th Guards Infantry Regiment	Lance Sergeant	27 February 1945 †	Killed in action on 12 February 1945	
Mazhit Dzhunusov	845th Infantry Regiment	Senior Sergeant	20 December 1943	Later killed in action on 9 April 1945	
Abu Dusukhambetov	229th Infantry Regiment	Senior Lieutenant	16 October 1943 †	Killed in action on 5 October 1943	
Nurshtbai Esebulatov	1075th Infantry Regiment	Red Army man	21 July 1942 †	Killed in action on 16 November 1941	
Saptar Estemesov	515th Infantry Regiment	Sergeant	4 June 1944	Went missing in action in 1944 shortly after award nomination and never see again	
Malik Gabdullin	8th Guards Motor Rifle Division	Senior Political Instructor	30 January 1943	—	
Kashagan Jamangarayev	1st Guards Artillery Brigade	Sergeant-Major	17 October 1943	—	
Temirbek Ibragimov	20th Independent Intelligence Company	Sergeant	30 October 1943 †	Killed in action on 15 October 1943	
Aytkesh Ibraev	1264th Infantry Regiment	Sergeant-Major	24 March 1945 †	Killed in action on 27 October 1944	
Iskak Ibraev	177th Guards Infantry Regiment	Lieutenant	27 February 1945	—	
Nagi Ilyasov	473rd Artillery Regiment	Lance-corporal	24 March 1945	—	
Bergen Isahanov	120th Infantry Regiment	Junior Lieutenant	30 October 1943	—	
Rasul Isetov	650th Infantry Regiment	Guard Sergeant	24 March 1945	—	
Kapay Iskakov	861st Infantry Regiment	Sergeant	13 September 1944	—	
Sundukkali Iskaliyev	556th Infantry Regiment	Private	24 March 1945 †	Killed in action on 24 June 1944	
Konstantin Ismagulov	1339th Infantry Regiment	Junior Lieutenant	17 November 1943	—	
Sydyk Ismailov	429th Anti-tank Artillery Regiment	Junior Lieutenant	1 November 1943	—	
Istay Ishchanov	206th Guards Light Artillery Regiment	Junior Sergeant	17 October 1943	Later killed in action on 1 September 1944	
Tulen Kabilov	72nd Guards Rifle Regiment	Guard Sergeant	19 April 1945 †	Killed in action on 10 April 1945	
Dzunuspei Kaipov	54th Light Artillery Regiment	Senior Sergeant	1 July 1944 †	Killed in action on 20 January 1944	
Mahmet Kairbaev	712th Anti-tank Artillery Regiment	Colonel	24 March 1945	—	
Dzumagali Kaldykorayev	7th Guards Anti-tank Fighter Division	Private	15 January 1944	Killed in action several days later on 26 January 1944	
Kanash Kamzin	429th Infantry Regiment	Lieutenant	13 September 1944 †	Killed in action on 14 April 1944	
Dzuman Karakulov	327th Guards Mountain Infantry Regiment	Private	24 March 1945	Killed in action on 18 October 1944	
Tule Kenzhebaev	60th Guards Cavalry Regiment	Private	15 January 1944	—	
Ahmediar Khusainov	167th Independent Artillery Battalion	Private	1 November 1943	—	
Zhalel Kizatov	154th Guards Artillery Regiment	Captain	15 January 1944	—	
Hamit Kobikov	23rd Guards Motorized Rifle Brigade	Guard Sergeant-Major	10 April 1945	—	
Taimbet Komekbaev	533rd Infantry Regiment	Sergeant-Major	10 April 1945	—	
Alikbai Kosaev	1075th Infantry Regiment	Red Army man	21 July 1942	Killed in action on 16 November 1941. One of Panfilov's Twenty-Eight Guardsmen	
Aliaskar Kozhebergenov	1075th Infantry Regiment	Red Army man	21 July 1942	Killed in action in January 1942.	
Akan Kurmanov	234th Guards Rifle Regiment	Sergeant	15 January 1944 †	Killed in action on 28 September 1943	
Manshuk Mametova	21st Guards Rifle Division	Senior Sergeant	1 March 1944 †	Killed in action on 15 October 1943. First Kazakh woman awarded the title.	
Martbek Mamrayev	32nd Guards Infantry Regiment	Guards senior sergeant	15 January 1944	—	
Kosan Mamutov	336th Guards Infantry Regiment	Junior Lieutenant	3 June 1944	—	
Temir Masin	922nd Infantry Regiment	Major	24 March 1945	—	
Nikolai Maydanov	325th Separate Transport and Helicopter Regiment	Colonel	29 June 1988	Also Hero of the Russian Federation	
Erezhebbay Moldabayev	545th Infantry Regiment	Lance Sergeant	23 September 1944 †	Killed in action on 7 August 1944	
Zhangazi Moldagaliev	120th Guards Rifle Regiment	Lieutenant	19 March 1944 †	Killed in action on 1 November 1943	
Aliya Moldagulova	54th Independent Rifle Brigade	Corporal	4 June 1944 †	Killed in action on 14 January 1944	
Bauyrzhan Momyshuly	1073rd Talgar Infantry Regiment	Guards Colonel	11 December 1990	Died of natural causes in 1982 before being awarded the title. Also Hero of Kazakhstan.	
Mukat Musayev	795th Infantry Regiment	Red Army Man	24 March 1945	—	
Serikbay Mutkenov	342nd Infantry Regiment	Staff Sergeant	9 February 1944 †	Killed in action on 15 January 1944	
Erdenbek Netkaliev	12th Guards Cavalry Regiment	Captain	24 March 1945 †	Killed in action on 2 February 1945	
Boran Nsanbayev	771st Artillery Regiment	Red Army Man	23 September 1943 †	Killed in action on 6 February 1943	
Zholdybai Nurlybayev	507th Anti-Tank Artillery Regiment	Captain	24 March 1945 †	Killed in action on 30 January 1945	
Sagadat Nurmagambetov	1052nd Infantry Regiment	Army general	27 February 1945	Also Hero of Kazakhstan	
Plis Nurpeisov	47th Guards Independent Reconnaissance Aviation Regiment	Guard Senior Lieutenant	18 August 1945 †	Killed in action on 23 April 1945	
Zhepasbai Nursitov	436th Infantry Regiment	Staff Sergeant	10 January 1944	—	
Kazbek Nurzhanov	61st Separate Anti-tank Regiment	Staff Sergeant	24 March 1945 †	Killed in action on 24 July 1944	
Beisen Ontayev	120th Infantry Regiment	Senior Lieutenant	30 October 1943	—	
Musabek Sengirbaev	1075th Infantry Regiment	Red Ary Man	21 July 1942 †	Killed in action on 16 November 1941. One of Panfilov's Twenty-Eight Guardsmen	
Esmurat Sikhimov	360th Infantry Regiment	Lance Sergeant	16 October 1943 †	Killed in action on 17 September 1943	
Karsybai Spataev	61st Cavalry Regiment	Red Army Man	17 April 1943 †	Killed in action on 26 November 1942	
Dzoldas Suleimenov	120th Infantry Regiment	Senior Lieutenant	30 October 1943	—	
Kudaibergen Suraganov	142nd Cannon Artillery Brigade	Senior Lieutenant	15 May 1946	—	
Agadil Suhambaev	628th Infantry Regiment	Red Army Man	24 March 1945 †	Killed in action on 31 July 1944	
Kenzhibek Shakenov	184th Guards Rifle Regiment	Major	22 February 1944	—	
Astanakul Shakirov	75th Guards Rifle Regiment	Red Army Guard	24 March 1945 †	Killed in action on 11 January 1945	
Sadu Shakirov	188th Argun Infantry Regiment	Red Army Man	30 October 1943	—	
Kenilbay Tuskulov	120th Infantry Regiment	Lieutenant	30 October 1943	—	
Seitkhan Temirbaev	990th Infantry Regiment	Major	31 May 1945	—	
Kozhakhmet Tishkanbaev	490th Anti-tank Artillery Regiment	Sergeant	16 May 1944 †	Killed in action on 2 November 1943	
Rahimzhan Tokatayev	1672nd Anti-tank Artillery Regiment	First Sergeant	29 June 1945	—	
Tulegen Tokhtarov	23rd Guards Rifle Regiment	Red Army Guard	30 January 1943 †	Killed in action on 10 February 1942	
Kydran Tugambayev	1116th Infantry Regiment	Red Army Man	19 March 1944 †	Killed in action on 17 December 1943	
Orman Tuktybaev	1280th Infantry Regiment	Lance Sergeant	24 March 1945 †	Killed in action on 20 July 1944	
Ilyas Urazov	572nd Infantry Regiment	Lieutenant	24 March 1945 †	Killed in action on 11 February 1945	
Esen Urakbaev	610th Infantry Regiment	Lieutenant	24 March 1945	—	
Idris Urgenishbaev	467th Infantry Regiment	Sergeant	15 January 1944 †	Killed in action on 6 October 1943	
Abdulla Usenov	159th Independent Sapper Battalion	Red Army Man	25 August 1944 †	Killed in action on 7 December 1943	
Zhanbek Yeleusov	25th Guards Infantry Regiment	Junior Lieutenant	16 October 1943	—	
Sadyk Zhaksygulov	209th Guards Rifle Regiment	Captain	22 February 1944	—	
Abdulla Zhanzakov	196th Guards Infantry Regiment	Lance Corporal	22 July 1944 †	Killed in action on 30 June 1940	
Kuzhabay Zhazikov	Independent Reconnaissance Company of the 25th Guards Rifle Division	Sergeant	28 April 1945	—	

== Test Pilots ==
Image	Name	Date of award	Notes	References
	Toktar Aubakirov	31 October 1988	Tested various MiG aircraft	
