= Konstantin Abazovsky =

Soviet lieutenant and flight commander (1919-1944)

Konstantin Antonovich Abazovsky
- Константин Антонович Абазовский
- Born: 1 October 1919; Obukhovo, Lepelsky Uyezd, Vitebsk Governorate, RSFSR
- Died: 26 October 1944 (aged 25)
- Military career
- Allegiance: Soviet Union
- Branch: Soviet Air Force
- Service years: 1940–1944
- Rank: Lieutenant
- Unit: 190th Attack Aviation Regiment
- Conflicts: World War II; Baltic Offensive
- Awards: Hero of the Soviet Union

Konstantin Antonovich Abazovsky (Russian: Константи́н Анто́нович Абазо́вский; 1 October 1919 – 26 October 1944) was a lieutenant and flight commander in the 190th Attack Aviation Regiment. He was killed in a dogfight on the same day he was awarded the title Hero of the Soviet Union.

== Early life ==
Abazovsky was born on 1 October 1919 in the village of Obukhovo in the Lepel district of Vitebsk Governorate to a peasant family of Belarusian ethnicity. He graduated from the Vitebsk Pedagogical Institute and was a history teacher in a junior high school in Plisa, Beshankovichy district. In 1940, Abazovsky was drafted into the Red Army.

== World War II ==
Abazovsky graduated from the Military Aviation School. He joined the Communist Party of the Soviet Union in 1943. During the same year, he was sent to the front and flew on the North Caucasian Front and then on the Crimean Front. He flew with the 190th Attack Aviation Regiment. On 25 August, he was awarded the Order of the Red Star. On 25 October, he was awarded the Order of the Patriotic War 2nd class. On 29 April 1944, Abazovsky received the Order of the Red Banner. On 6 May 1944, the flight commanded by Abazovsky reportedly shot down five German fighters, destroyed eight on the ground and destroyed two warehouses full of ammunition in Sevastopol. On 19 May, he was awarded the Order of the Red Star again for his actions. By August 1944, Abazovsky was a flight commander in the regiment, attached to the 2nd Baltic Front. By this point in the war, he had made 106 sorties, reportedly destroying 11 tanks and three aircraft on the ground. On 26 October 1944, he was awarded the title Hero of the Soviet Union and the Order of Lenin. On the same day, Abazovsky was killed in a dogfight. Abazovsky was awarded the Order of the Red Banner a second time on 28 October 1944.

== Legacy ==
A school in Plisa is named after Abazovsky.
