= Rem Abzalov =

Hero of the Soviet Union (1914–1983)

- Native name: Рем Абзал улы Абзалов
- Born: 28 June [O.S. 15 June] 1914; Tashkent, Russian Empire (Note: Some sources say he was born in Srednee Baltaevo, located in present-day Tatarstan.)
- Died: 7 February 1983 (aged 68) Tashkent, Uzbek SSR, USSR
- Allegiance: Soviet Union
- Branch: Red Army
- Service years: 1939–1960
- Rank: Major
- Conflicts: World War II
- Awards: Hero of the Soviet Union

Rem Abzalovich Abzalov (Tatar: Рем Абзал улы Абзалов, Russian: Рем Абзалович Абзалов; 28 June [O.S. 15 June] 1914 — 7 February 1983) was a Red Army officer who was awarded the title Hero of the Soviet Union in 1945.

== Early life ==
Abzalov was born on 28 June [O.S. 15 June] 1914 to a working-class Volga Tatar family in Tashkent. He got his primary education at a madrasah before moving to Kazan where he worked at a factory. He later attended a rabfak and a trade union school before being drafted into the Red Army in 1939. He participated in the Winter War and worked as chairman of the factory committee at the Kazan Aviation Plant and entered the worker's faculty of Kazan State University. In 1941 he became a member of the Communist Party.

== World War II ==
In 1942 he was redrafted into the Red Army and sent to political training courses before going to the front. He participated in the battles for Ukraine, Romania, Bulgaria, Yugoslavia, and Hungary. He especially distinguished himself in the crossing of the Danube River. On 1 December 1944 he commanded his company in the 116th Guards Rifle Regiment, leading them in the crossing of the Danube. An intense battle with the enemy forces ensued, and they repelled three enemy counterattacks during the liberation of the village of Bácsalmás. For his heroism in the battles for Hungary he was awarded the title Hero of the Soviet Union on 24 March 1945. By the end of the war he was in command of a rifle battalion.

== Later life ==
He remained in the army after the war, and after completing the Vystrel course in 1946 he commanded a regiment in the Turkestan Military District. He ended his service with the rank of major as the military commissioner for the city of Tashkent. He lived in Tashkent for the rest of his life and died on 7 February 1983.
