= Sadyk Abdujabbarov =

Kazakh hero of the Soviet Union

- Садық Әбдіжаппаров
- Born: 15 July 1925; Kyzl-Aryk, Kazakh ASSR, USSR
- Died: 30 July 2004 (aged 79); Almaty, Kazakhstan
- Military career
- Allegiance: Soviet Union
- Branch: Red Army
- Service years: 1943–1945
- Rank: Lieutenant
- Unit: 219th Guards Rifle Regiment
- Conflicts: World War II
- Awards: Hero of the Soviet Union

Sadyk Abdujabbarov (Kazakh: Садық Сертекұлы Әбдіжаппаров, Russian: Садык Абдужаббаров; 15 July 1925 — 30 July 2004) was a Kazakh officer in the Red Army who distinguished himself in Operation Bagration for which he was awarded the title Hero of the Soviet Union on 22 July 1944.

== See also ==
- List of Kazakh Heroes of the Soviet Union
