= Gorbunovo =

Gorbunovo Горбуново
- Village
- Location within Perm Krai Location within Russia
- Coordinates: 57°50′N 56°22′E
- Country: Russia
- Region: Perm Krai
- District: Permsky District
- Time zone: UTC+5:00

Gorbunovo (Russian: Горбуново) is a rural locality (a village) in Lobanovskoye Rural Settlement, Permsky District, Perm Krai, Russia. The population was 191 as of 2010. There are 11 streets.

== Geography ==
Gorbunovo is located 23 km southeast of Perm (the district's administrative centre) by road. Balandino is the nearest rural locality.
