= Mikhail Abdolov =

- Михаил Абдолов
- Born: 1 June 1918; Bitik, Ural Oblast, Soviet Russia
- Died: 11 May 2006 (aged 87); Bulan, Akzhaik District, Kazakhstan
- Military career
- Allegiance: Soviet Union
- Branch: Red Army
- Service years: 1938–1946
- Rank: senior sergeant
- Unit: 111th Separate Reconnaissance Company
- Conflicts: World War II
- Awards: Hero of the Soviet Union

Mikhail Abdolov (Kazakh and Russian: Михаил Абдолов; 1 June 1918 — 11 May 2006) was a Kazakh scout in World War II who was awarded the title Hero of the Soviet Union on 24 March 1945 for crossing the Danube and personally capturing four Nazi soldiers in a special operation in Hungary.

== See also ==
- List of Kazakh Heroes of the Soviet Union
