= Anuar Abutalipov =

Kazakh machine gunner

- Әнуар Әбутәліпов
- Born: 7 December 1923; Besharyk aul, Turkestan ASSR, RSFSR, USSR
- Died: 30 July 2002 (aged 78); Janakorgan District, Kazakhstan
- Military career
- Allegiance: Soviet Union
- Branch: Red Army
- Service years: 1942–1945
- Rank: Krasnoarmeets
- Unit: 13th Guards Airborne Regiment
- Conflicts: World War II
- Awards: Hero of the Soviet Union

Anuar Abutalipov (Kazakh: Әнуар Әбутәліпов, Russian: Ануар Абуталипов; 7 December 1923 — 30 July 2002) was a Kazakh machine gunner in the 13th Guards Airborne Regiment of the Red Army during World War II. He was awarded the title Hero of the Soviet Union on 24 March 1945 for his combat feats.

== Prewar ==
Abutalipov was born on 7 December 1923 to a Kazakh peasant family in Besharyk aul. He completed an elementary education and worked on a collective farm. He was a member of the Komsomol.

== Combat ==
He was drafted into the Red Army in September 1942 and deployed to the front in 1943 as a machine gun operator in the 13th Guards Airborne Regiment. He experienced his baptism by fire in February. He distinguished himself on 24 October 1944 when he commanded boat No. 3. in crossing the Tisza River in Hungary with two other soldiers behind him. They held their ground, and made 47 tripes in two days to transport equipment and ammunition to the other side, going without sleep for over a day and killing 18 enemy soldiers with his machine gun. He also hit three enemy Tiger tanks. For his feat he was awarded the title Hero of the Soviet Union on 24 March 1945.

== After the war ==
He returned to his homeland in August 1945 and worked as a team leader on the collective farm. He died on 30 July 2002 and in 2003, School No. 209 in his home district was named after him.

== See also ==
- List of Kazakh Heroes of the Soviet Union
