= Mehmet Aipov =

Soviet Tatar soldier and Hero of the Soviet Union (1920-1945)

- Мәхмүт Аипов
- Born: 12 July 1920; Kiryushkino village, Khvalynsky Uyezd, Saratov Governorate, RSFSR
- Died: 22 April 1945 (aged 24); Kaulsdorf, Berlin, Nazi Germany
- Burial place: Międzyrzecz Soviet military cemetery, Poland
- Military career
- Allegiance: Soviet Union
- Branch: Red Army
- Service years: 1942–1945
- Rank: Soldier
- Unit: 230th Rifle Division
- Conflicts: World War II; Battle of Berlin
- Awards: Hero of the Soviet Union

Mehmet Aipov (Tatar: Мәхмүт Аипов; 12 July 1920 – 22 April 1945) was a Tatar Red Army soldier who fought during World War II. Aipov was posthumously awarded the title Hero of the Soviet Union for actions during the Battle of Berlin, where he reportedly killed 26 German soldiers. Aipov died of the wounds he got in the battle.

== Early life ==
Aipov was born on 12 July 1920 to a peasant family in the village of Kiryushkino in the Khvalynsky Uyezd of Saratov Governorate in the Russian Soviet Federative Socialist Republic. His family moved to Kostychi village when he was still a child. Aipov received primary education and worked as a mechanic on the Kuybyshev Railway depot at Oktyabrsk.

== World War II ==
In April 1942, Aipov volunteered for the Red Army. He was in combat within a month and fought on the Southwestern Front and the Stalingrad Front. Aipov was wounded in September 1942. In April 1943, he joined the Communist Party of the Soviet Union. From September, he fought on the Southern Front and then on the 3rd Ukrainian Front.

By spring 1944, Aipov was a soldier in the 8th Rifle Company of the 990th Rifle Regiment of the 230th Rifle Division. On 17 April, during the Crimean Offensive on the outskirts of Sevastopol, Aipov fought in a reconnaissance mission, reportedly killing two German soldiers despite being wounded, and bringing back intelligence. He was awarded the Medal For Courage for his actions on 10 May. In October, the division was transferred to the 1st Belorussian Front, and Aipov fought in the Vistula–Oder Offensive in January 1945.

During the Battle of Berlin, Aipov reportedly replaced a wounded machine gunner on 22 April and suppressed German fire in the suburb of Kaulsdorf. After attacking a basement, he reportedly killed several German soldiers but was also wounded himself. Afterwards, Aipov threw a grenade but was seriously wounded again. On the same day, he died of his wounds. Reportedly, Aipov had killed a total of 26 German soldiers.

He was buried in the Soviet military cemetery in Międzyrzecz.

== Awards ==
- Hero of the Soviet Union
- Order of Lenin
- Medal "For Courage"

== Legacy ==
- School No. 11 in Oktyabrsk is named after Aipov, as well as a street in the same city.
- A memorial plaque with materials about life and heroism of Mehmet Aipov has been installed in the carriage depot of Oktyabrsk station.
