= 1990 Kazakh presidential election =

- 24 April 1990

335 from 360 Members of the Supreme Soviet 180 votes needed to win
- Turnout: 93.05%
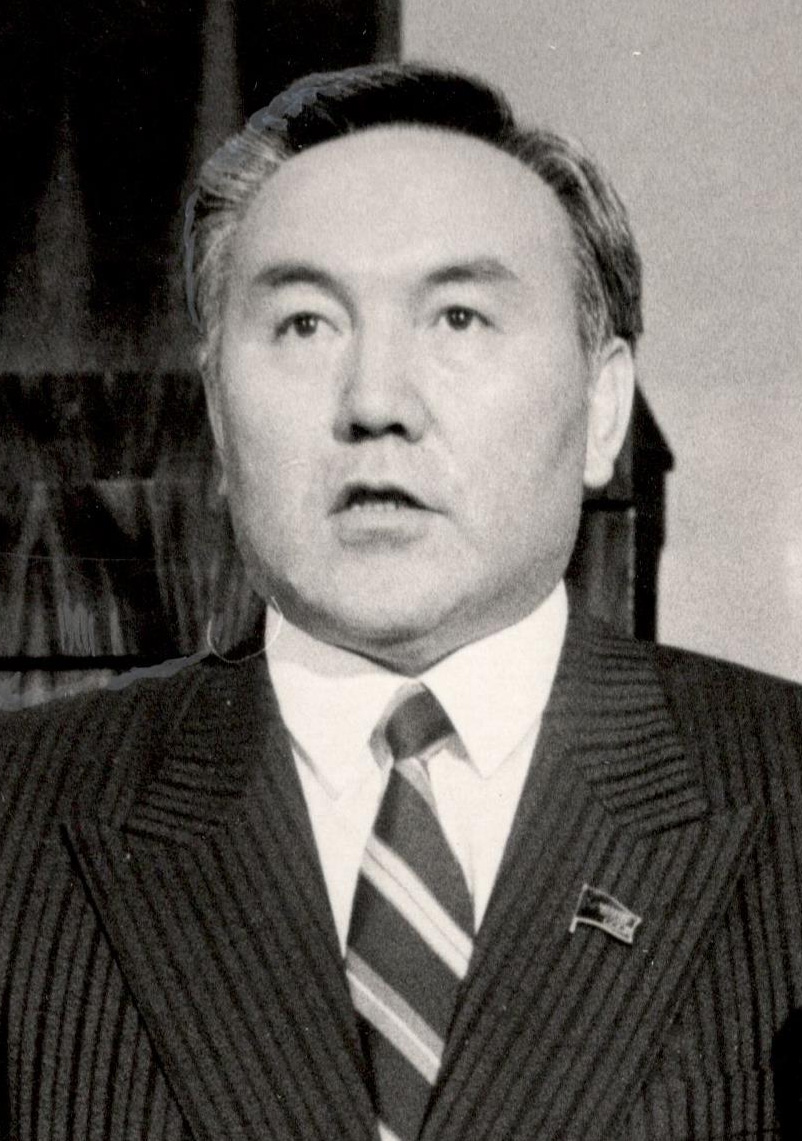
| Nominee | Nursultan Nazarbayev |
| Party | QKP |
| Running mate | Sergey Tereshchenko |
| MP votes | 317 |
| Percentage | 94.62% |
- Votes of the Supreme Soviet Nursultan Nazarbayev: 317 Against: 18 Did not vote: 25
Elected President
Nursultan Nazarbayev
Independent

Presidential elections were held in Kazakh SSR on 24 April 1990 to elect the president for a six-year term. Chairman of the Supreme Soviet Nursultan Nazarbayev was chosen to be the president by 317 of the 360 members. The election was uncontested.

== Background ==
On 24 April 1990, the Supreme Soviet adopted the law "On the establishment of the post of President of the Kazakh SSR and amendments and additions to the Constitution of the Kazakh SSR." The discussion of the establishment of the post took place. Some members of the council believed that the institution of the presidency would alienate the republic from the union center, create a legal framework for the complete independence of Kazakhstan, and could become the basis for authoritarianism. Others, on the contrary, unanimously supported the need to introduce the post of President in the republic, putting forward a variety of political and legal arguments.

317 members of the Supreme Soviet elected its chairman Nursultan Nazarbayev to be the President while 18 were voted against. Nazarbayev from 1984 served as the Prime Minister of the Kazakh SSR. On 22 June 1989, he became the First Secretary of the Communist Party of Kazakhstan and then from 22 February 1990, he was chosen to the chairman of the Supreme Soviet.

Sergey Tereshchenko was elected as Vice President of Kazakh SSR.

== Results ==
| Candidate | Party | Votes | % |
|---|---|---|---|
| Nursultan Nazarbayev | Communist Party of Kazakhstan | 317 | 94.63 |
| Against | | 18 | 5.37 |
| Total | | 335 | 100.00 |
| Registered voters/turnout | | 360 | – |
Source: e-history.kz
