= Mukatai Abeulov =

- Мұқатай Әбеулов
- Born: 1917; Sarkamysh village, Semipalatinsk Oblast, Russian Empire
- Died: 16 December 1944 (aged 26–27); Nógrád County, Hungary
- Military career
- Allegiance: Soviet Union
- Branch: Cossak Cavalry Corps
- Service years: 1941–1944
- Rank: Krasnoarmeets
- Unit: 152nd Guards Anti-tank Artillery Regiment
- Conflicts: World War II †
- Awards: Hero of the Soviet Union

Mukatai Abeulov (Kazakh: Мұқатай Әбеулов, Russian: Мукатай Абеулов: 1917 — 16 December 1944) was a Kazakh soldier in the 152nd Guards Anti-tank Artillery Regiment of the Cossak Cavalry Corps in the Red Army. During the battles for Hungary he knocked out six enemy tanks before he was killed in action. He was posthumously awarded the title Hero of the Soviet Union on 28 April 1945.

== See also ==
- List of Kazakh Heroes of the Soviet Union
