= Height of Immortality =

Memorial complex in Rostov Oblast, Russia

- Высота бессмертия (Russian)
- Location within Russia
- Location: Belaya Kalitva, Rostov oblast Russia

History
- Built: 1967

The Height of Immortality is a World War II memorial founded in 1967 in the settlement of Atayevo near the city of Belaya Kalitva.

== History ==
The complex commemorates the soldiers of a cavalry squadron of the 112th Bashkir Cavalry Division, led by Lieutenant Annaklych Atayev. Atayev's squadron defended a hill on the outskirts of Belaya Kalitva against a German infantry battalion supported by tanks and artillery during the fighting to liberate the town in January 1943 during World War II. Killed in the fighting, Atayev was posthumously made a Hero of the Soviet Union and his soldiers posthumously received the Order of the Patriotic War, 1st class.

Initially, the memorial consisted of three steles and an eternal flame. On the 40th anniversary of the Soviet victory in World War II, a sculpture of a grieving woman representing the Motherland with a laurel wreath in her hand was placed between the steles. Memorial stones inscribed with the names of the soldiers killed in the fighting are placed in a semicircle, and the inscription "In memory of the fallen – be worthy" runs through entire memorial.

The memorial is the site of annual 9 May commemorations of Victory Day.
