= Soli Adashev =

Uzbek squad commander

- Born: 23 March 1923; Tuda village, Turkestan ASSR, RSFSR, USSR
- Died: 2 November 1984 (aged 61); Namangan, Uzbek SSR, USSR
- Military career
- Allegiance: Soviet Union
- Branch: Red Army
- Service years: 1942–1945
- Rank: Senior sergeant
- Unit: 459th Rifle Regiment
- Conflicts: World War II
- Awards: Hero of the Soviet Union

Soli Adashev (23 March 1923—2 November 1984) was an Uzbek squad commander in the 459th Rifle Regiment of the Red Army who was awarded the title Hero of the Soviet Union for heroism in World War II.

== Early life ==
Adashev was born on 23 March 1923 to an Uzbek peasant family in Tuda village, located in what is now the Namangan Region of Uzbekistan. After graduating from school, he attended the Andijan Pedagogical College, graduating in 1941.

== World War II ==
He was drafted into the Red Army in June 1941, but was not on the front until a year later.

He especially distinguished himself in the battles for Mogilev at height 192.2 on 23 June 1944, where he led his squad in breaking through enemy defenses and trenches, killing ten Germans. The next day, when attacking another trench he personally killed six Germans by use of a machine gun, and then took another as prisoner. When advancing to Chernyavka village, he was the first to enter the area, and he took out an enemy machine gun. While surrounded he organized a careful defense with his squad to hold the position. For those feats he was awarded the title Hero of the Soviet Union on 24 March 1945.

During the war, he fought on the Western and 1st Belorussian fronts in battles for major cities including Rzhev-Vyazemsk, Smolensk, Orsha, Mogilev, Minsk, Bialystok, and Berlin.

== Later life ==
After the end of the war, he was demobilized from the army and returned to Namangan, where he died on 2 November 1984.
