= Samig Abdullayev =

Hero of the Soviet Union (1917–1998)

- Born: 25 October [O.S. 12 October] 1917; Tashkent, Russian Empire
- Died: 10 May 1998 (aged 80); Tashkent, Uzbekistan
- Military career
- Allegiance: Soviet Union
- Branch: Red Army
- Service years: 1938–1945
- Rank: Starshina
- Conflicts: World War II
- Awards: Hero of the Soviet Union

Samig Fayzullovich Abdullayev (Uzbek: Samigʻ Fayzullovich Abdullayev, Uzbek Cyrillic: Самиғ Файзуллович Абдуллаев, Russian: Самиг Файзуллович Абдуллаев; 25 October [O.S. 12 October] 1917 — 10 May 1998) was an Uzbek soldier in the Red Army during World War II who was awarded the title Hero of the Soviet Union on 16 May 1944. After the war he became a painter and became an Honored Worker of Art of the Uzbek SSR for his work. For ten years he was the head of the Union of Artists of the Uzbek SSR.

== Early life ==
Abdullayev was born on 25 October [O.S. 12 October] 1917 to an Uzbek peasant family in Tashkent. After graduating from his seventh grade of school in 1932 he entered the Tashkent Art School, which he graduated from in 1937. He then entered the Red Army in September 1938 and served in the engineering troops.

== World War II ==
At the start of the war he was a squad commander in the 8th Separate Light Transport Unit, having arrived on the warfront in October 1941. He participated in the battles for the Caucasus and Krasnodar. In June 1943 he became a squad commander in the 97th Separate Motorized Engineering Battalion, where he distinguished himself during the Novorossiysk-Taman operation. On the night of 16 September 1943 he led the sappers under his command in a dangerous mission at night to remove landmines from the area of the Krasny farm in Krasnodar. He personally neutralized 36 mines, clearing the way for tanks to drive though the area. However, the Nazis blew up the bridge over the Kudako River, preventing the advance of Soviet tanks. His squad restored the bridge in just three hours despite taking intense enemy fire, allowing the tanks to advance. On 17 September he saved another bridge by crawling to a burning fuse cord and cutting it before it could explode, all while wounded. On 16 May 1944 he was awarded the title Hero of the Soviet Union for his bravery in the battle.

== Later life ==
After being demobilized in 1945 he lived in Tashkent, where he worked as a painter. He served as the chairman of the board of the Union of Artists of the Uzbek SSR until 1955, and then worked as director of the State Art Museum of Uzbekistan. He died on 10 May 1998.

== Awards ==
- Hero of the Soviet Union (16 May 1944)
- Order of Lenin (16 May 1944)
- Two Order of the Red Banner (9 October 1943 and 25 February 1944)
- Order of the Patriotic War 1st class (11 March 1985)
- Order of the Patriotic War 2nd class (11 June 1943)
- Two Order of the Badge of Honor
- Medal "For Distinguished Labour" (18 March 1959)
- Honoured Worker of Art of the Uzbek SSR (11 November 1967)
- campaign and jubilee medals
