= Ruzi Azimov =

Hero of the Soviet Union (1925–2006)

- Ro‘zi Azimov; Рўзи Азимов
- Born: 22 September 1925; Chukatepa, Kirgiz autonomous oblast, RSFSR, USSR
- Died: 2006 (aged 80–81); Jalal-Abad, Kyrgyzstan
- Military career
- Allegiance: Soviet Union
- Branch: Red Army
- Service years: 1943–1944
- Rank: Private
- Unit: 1124th Rifle Regiment
- Conflicts: World War II
- Awards: Hero of the Soviet Union

Ruzi Azimov (Note: Uzbek: Ro‘zi Azimov/Рўзи Азимов, Russian: Рузи, Рози, or Роза Азимович Азимов) (22 September 1925 — 2006) was an Uzbek soldier in the Red Army during World War II who was awarded the title Hero of the Soviet Union.

== Early life ==
Azimov was born on 22 September 1925 to an Uzbek peasant family in Chukatepa village, located in present-day Kyrgyzstan. With an incomplete secondary education, he worked as an accountant on a kolkhoz and was a member of the Komsomol. Before being sent to the front he trained at the Tashkent Infantry School named after V.I. Lenin from September 1943 to May 1944.

== World War II ==
Ha arrived at the 1st Baltic Front on 3 June 1944 and distinguished himself in battle on 23 June 1944 near the village of Kozonogovo in Belarus, encouraging his comrades to go on with an attack against enemy forces. Two days later he was one of the first to cross the Daugava, and then broke into an enemy trench, killing many enemy soldiers in the process. However, he was badly wounded by an enemy artillery shell that exploded near him, and he was hospitalized for a long time after that, but never returned to the front because of the severity of his wounds. On 22 July 1944 he was awarded the title Hero of the Soviet Union. Afanasy Beloborodov said about him "He proved himself to be a fearless warrior."

== Later life ==
After returning to his homeland he worked on a collective farm. In 1951 he graduated from the Republican Party School under the Central Committee of the Communist Party of the Kyrgyz SSR, and then from the Jalal-Abad Pedagogical School in 1965. He died in 2006.
