= Sodiq Alinazarov =

Soviet military personnel (1914–1969)

- Содиқ Алиназаров
- Born: 1914; Pishpek, Russian Empire
- Died: 7 March 1969 (aged 54–55); Frunze, Kyrgyz SSR, USSR
- Military career
- Allegiance: Soviet Union
- Branch: Red Army
- Service years: 1942–1945
- Rank: Private
- Conflicts: World War II
- Awards: Hero of the Soviet Union

Sodiq Alinazarov (Russian: Садык Алиназаров; 1914 — 7 March 1969) was an Uzbek machine-gunner in World War II and Hero of the Soviet Union from Kyrgyzstan.

== Background ==
Alinazarov was born in 1914 to a working-class ethnic Uzbek family in Bishkek, located in present-day Kyrgyzstan. He lost his parents at an early age, and had only a primary education. Before the war he worked at a meat processing factory.

== World War II ==
Drafted into the Red Army in 1942, he arrived at the front in August 1943. He soon distinguished himself in the crossing of the Dnieper River on the night of 24–25 September, being the first in the Okuninovo area to cross the river. For two days he fought hard to hold the bridgehead, repelling twelve enemy counterattacks. During one of the attacks he ran out of ammunition for his machine gun, so he moved to the Nazi position and stole a machine gun and ammunition to continue fighting them. In the end, he killed a platoon's worth of enemy fighters. For 42 hours he held his position and never left his machine gun, saving his detachment and enabling crossing of the Dnieper in the area. For the feat he was awarded the title Hero of the Soviet Union on 17 October 1943.

== Later life ==
After the war he was demobilized from the Red Army and returned to his home city. He died on 7 March 1969.

== See also ==
- Uzbeks in Kyrgyzstan
