= Stepan Artyomenko =

Soviet Ukrainian officer (1913–1977)

Stepan Yelizarovich Artyomenko
- Степан Елизарович Артёменко
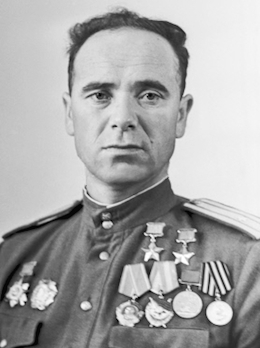
- Born: 22 January [O.S. 9 January] 1913; Ratsulovo village, Kherson Governorate, Russian Empire (located within present-day Ivanivka Raion, Odesa Oblast, Ukraine)
- Died: 5 May 1977 (aged 64); Odesa, Soviet Union
- Military career
- Allegiance: Soviet Union
- Branch: Infantry
- Service years: 1935–1937; 1941–1955
- Rank: Colonel
- Unit: 447th Rifle Regiment
- Conflicts: World War II
- Awards: Hero of the Soviet Union (twice)

Stepan Yelizarovich Artyomenko (Russian: Степан Елизарович Артёменко; 22 January [O.S. 9 January] 1913 – 5 May 1977) was the commander of a battalion of the 447th Rifle Regiment in the Red Army during the Second World War, who was twice awarded the title Hero of the Soviet Union.

== Early life ==
Artyomenko was born on 22 January [O.S. 9 January] 1913 to a Ukrainian peasant family in Ratsulovo village, then located within the Kherson Governorate of the Russian Empire. (now located in the Ivanivka Raion of present-day Ukraine.) Having completed schooling in 1927, he entered the Red Army in 1935 and later worked for the NKVD.

== World War II ==
Not long after the German invasion of the Soviet Union, Artyomenko was deployed to the warfront in August 1941 as an ordinary soldier. During the fighting around Kharkov, he replaced his platoon commander who was unable to fight, and for several days led and defended his sector, not letting the enemy pass through. On one occasion near Izyum-Barvenkovskom he commanded a company of machine gunners that were part of a tank brigade. He went on to fight in the Battle of Stalingrad and the Kursk Bulge.

Upon breaking through enemy defenses on the western bank of the Vistula in January 1945, Artyomenko's battalion captured two rows of enemy trenches, and then with the help of tank crews, made their way to the Polish city of Sochaczew where they attacked an enemy garrison there.

He was awarded his first gold star on 27 February 1945 for successfully leading his battalion through Warsaw and throughout Poland. During the Battle of Berlin he was seriously wounded during the close-quarters fighting. After the surrender of Nazi Germany he was awarded the title Hero of the Soviet Union again on 31 May 1945 for his actions in the crossing of the Oder River and Berlin.

== Postwar ==
After the end of the war he remained in the Red Army, and from 1946 to 1948 he attended an officer improvement school. When he retired in 1955, he was the commissar of the military enlistment office in Odesa. After his death on 5 May 1977 he was buried in Odesa at the 2nd Christian cemetery.

== Awards ==
- Gold Star Medal No.5687
- Order of Lenin
- Two Orders of the Red Banner
- Order of Alexander Nevsky
- Order of the Patriotic War, 1st degree
- Order of the Red Star
