= Urinboy Abdullayev =

- Oʻrinboy Abdullayev
- Born: 18 April [O.S. 5 April] 1912; Bagyabsky, Syr-Darya Oblast, Russian Empire
- Died: 15 August 1989 (aged 77); Toʻrtkoʻl District, Karakalpak ASSR, Uzbek SSR, USSR
- Military career
- Allegiance: Soviet Union
- Branch: Red Army
- Service years: 1943–1944
- Rank: Private
- Unit: 375th Rifle Regiment
- Conflicts: World War II
- Awards: Hero of the Soviet Union

Urinboy Abdullayev (Uzbek: Oʻrinboy Abdullayev, Ўринбой Абдуллаев, Russian: Урунбай Абдуллаев; 18 April [O.S. 5 April] 1912 — 15 August 1989) was a soldier in the Red Army from Karakalpakstan who was awarded the title Hero of the Soviet Union for his bravery in the battle for height 144.

== Early life ==
Abdullayev was born to a peasant family on 18 April [O.S. 5 April] 1912 in Bagyabsky village, located in present-day Karakalpakstan, Uzbekistan. Sources differ as to if he was an ethnic Uzbek or an ethnic Karakalpak. (Note: The 1984 book about Heroes of the Soviet Union in the Uzbek SSR said that he was Karakalpak, but the 1987 encyclopedia about Heroes of the Soviet Union said that he was an ethnic Uzbek.) With only a basic primary education, he worked on a collective farm before being drafted into the Red Army in January 1943.

== World War II ==
He arrived on the warfront in May 1943 as a private in the 1st Company of the 375th Rifle Regiment (219th Infantry Division, 3rd Shock Army, 2nd Baltic Front). He was part of a special operation in the village of Rundeni in the Latvian SSR where he was part of a group of scouts led by Khaimyan Akhmetgalin to hold the tactically important hill No. 144.0. They were heavily outnumbered by Nazi forces and most of them were killed in the battle, and higher command believed that they were all killed, but Abdullayev survived the battle, albeit badly injured. He was taken to a concentration camp near Magdeburg. On 24 March 1945 he was “posthumously” awarded the title Hero of the Soviet Union, along with the other defenders of the hill who perished in the battle or were thought to have been killed in the battle.

== Later life ==
Originally he lived in Ufa after the end of the war, but then returned to the Karakalpak ASSR where he worked as a foreman of cotton growers on the collective farm named after the XXII Party Congress in Karakalpakstan. It was not until 19 January 1961 that he received his gold star and Order of Lenin medals. In May 1962 and November 1963 he visited in the site of hill 144.0, and in 1965 he became a member of the Communist Party. He died in Toʻrtkoʻl on 15 August 1989.
