= Hallok Aminov =

Soviet military personnel (1914–1969)

- Ҳаллок Аминов
- Born: 3 May [O.S. 20 April] 1915; Iskogare, Bukhara, Russian Empire
- Died: 7 June 1993 (aged 78); Iskogare, Uzbekistan
- Military career
- Allegiance: Soviet Union
- Branch: cavalry
- Service years: 1941–1945
- Rank: Private
- Conflicts: World War II
- Awards: Hero of the Soviet Union

Hallok Aminov (Uzbek Cyrillic: Ҳаллок Аминов, Russian: Халлак Аминов; 3 May [O.S. 20 April] 1915 — 7 June 1993) was an Uzbek soldier in the cavalry of the Red Army during World War II who was awarded the title Hero of the Soviet Union in 1944 for bravery in battle.

== Background ==
Aminov was born on 3 May [O.S. 20 April] 1915 to an Uzbek peasant family in Iskogare, located in present-day Uzbekistan. After finishing school he worked as a foreman on a collective farm, and after the war he returned to his home village, where he became the chairman of the Dzhuinavsky village council and was chairman of a collective farm. He died on 7 June 1993.

== World War II ==
Although he was drafted into the Red Army in December 1941, he was not in active duty until November 1942. He then served in the 60th Guards Cavalry Regiment of the 16th Guards Chernigov Cavalry Division, which was originally the 112th Bashkir Cavalry Division. He participated in a battle near Stalingrad where he and other cavalrymen stormed Nazi supply warehouses and then took over the headquarters of a Nazi unit, killing the soldiers stationed there. During a battle in Chernigov he led an attack on a Nazi communications center, killing two enemy signalmen with grenades and then taking four enemy soldiers as prisoners. In summer 1943 he fought in the battle of Kursk, and in September 1943, he became a squad commander. On the night of 27–28 September 1943, he and 14 other soldiers crossed the Dnieper River near the village Komarin. He then made six more crossings of the river with other soldiers. During a fight on a bridgehead, he killed three Nazis and took four more as prisoners of war. For his feats in the Dnieper crossing he was awarded the title Hero of the Soviet Union on 15 January 1944. He was, however, badly wounded by bullets from a machine gun during a battle in February 1944. It took a long time to recover from the injuries.
