= Satbayev =

Satpayev can refer to:

- Kanysh Satbayev, Kazakhstani scientist
- Satbayev (city), a city in Karagandy Province, Kazakhstan
