= Murat Aitkhozhin =

Soviet biologist

Academician Murat Abenovich Aitkhozhin
- Мұрат Әбенұлы Айтхожин
- Born: June 29, 1939; Petropavlovsk
- Died: December 19, 1987 (aged 48); Almaty
- Education: Moscow State University, Kazakh State University
- Awards: Lenin Prize, Order of the Friendship of Peoples
- Scientific career
- Fields: Molecular Biology
- Workplaces: Kazakhstan Academy of Sciences
- Doctoral advisor: Alexander Spirin

Murat Abenovich Aitkhozhin (Kazakh: Murat Ábenuly Aıthojın, Russian: Мурaт Абенович Айтхoжин) (29 June 1939 – 19 December 1987) was a Kazakh Soviet molecular biologist: the founder of molecular biology in Kazakhstan. He was the President of the Kazakhstan Academy of Sciences (1986–87), Deputy of The Supreme Soviet of the USSR, member (and Chairman of the Kazakh branch) of the Soviet Peace Fund. He was the founder and first Director of the Kazakh Institute of Molecular Biology and Biochemistry as well as being an Academician of the Academy of Sciences of the Kazakh SSR (1983), Doctor of Sciences (1977), Professor (1980) and Lenin Prize laureate (1976).

== Biography ==
=== Early career ===
Murat Aitkhozhin was born on 29 June 1939 in Petropavlovsk in the Kazakh SSR in a large family. He was educated at the Kazakh State University (KazGU) (graduated in 1962) and Moscow State University (graduated in 1965).

In 1966, Aitkhozhin defended his thesis on “Ribonucleic Acids in the Early Embryogenesis of Loach Misgurnus fossilis” and between 1965 and 1967 he worked as a junior researcher. From 1967 to 1969 he was a senior research fellow at the Institute of Botany of the Academy of Sciences of the Kazakh SSR, and became head of the laboratory in 1969.

In 1976, he defended a doctoral dissertation at Moscow State University on the topic: "Ribonucleoprotein particles of higher plants." He was awarded the diploma No. 1 of a doctor of sciences in the specialty of molecular biology. In the same year he was awarded the most important prize of the USSR, the Lenin Prize for the discovery of a special class of ribonucleoprotein particles, informosomes.

=== Institute Director ===
In 1978, he became the director of the Institute of Botany of the Academy of Sciences of the Kazakh SSR, and was elected as a Corresponding Member of the Academy the following year (1979).

In 1983, he founded the Institute of Molecular Biology and Biochemistry of the Academy of Sciences of the Kazakh SSR. and was elected to the position of Academician of the Academy of Sciences of the Kazakh SSR. The international recognition of the successes of molecular biology in Kazakhstan was the holding in 1984 of the international symposium "Prospects for bioorganic chemistry and molecular biology" at the institute. The symposium was attended by leading scientists in the field of molecular biology and bioorganic chemistry, dozens of Nobel Prize winners – including Linus Pauling and Dorothy Hodgkin. At this international symposium Aitkhozhin made a large plenary report.

=== President of the Academy of Sciences ===
On 22 April 1986, at a turning point for the country and the republic, Aitkhozhin was elected as President of the Academy of Sciences of the Kazakh SSR, a post in which he served until his death in 1987.

On June 5, 1986, a session of the General Meeting of the Academy of Sciences of the Kazakh SSR was held, which was opened by the President of the Academy of Sciences of the Kazakh SSR, Academician M. A. Aitkhozhin, with the report "Tasks of scientists of the Academy of Sciences of the Kazakh SSR on the implementation of decisions of the XXVII Congress of the CPSU and XVI Congress of the Communist Party of Kazakhstan." At the session, Dinmukhamed Kunaev, First Secretary of the Communist Party of Kazakhstan and member of the Politburo of the USSR also spoke.

Murat Aitkhozhin conducted tremendous organizational work as President of the Academy of Sciences of the Kazakh SSR – over the period under his leadership, the coordination of scientific research in Kazakhstan significantly improved and cooperation with leading research centers was expanded, which ensured the passage of academic science to the modern frontiers of scientific and technological progress.

As president of the Academy of Sciences, Aitkhozhin paid great attention to the training of young scientific personnel. Being a professor at Kazakh State University, he taught a self-developed course in molecular biology and special courses on biochemistry for many years. He created the only dissertation council in the Central Asian region on the defense of candidate dissertations in molecular biology and biochemistry. Additional funds were allocated to expand the list of leading journals from abroad according to the profiles of sciences obtained by the Central Scientific Library of the Academy of Sciences.

== Contribution to Science ==
Murat Aitkhozhin was the founder of molecular biology and biotechnology in Kazakhstan. Aitkhozhin was engaged in the search and study of the physicochemical properties of informosomes in plant cells in the group of academician A.S. Spirin. The group discovered classes of plant informosomes - free cytoplasmic, polysomal-linked, and nuclear, including RNA-binding proteins. For this work, they were awarded the Lenin Prize in 1976.

In 1983, Aitkhozhin founded the Institute of Molecular Biology and Biochemistry of the Academy of Sciences of the Kazakh SSR. In 1987, he organized the Kazakh Agricultural Biotechnology Center, where work is carried out on cell and genetic engineering of plants. Murat Aitkhozhin first introduced the course of molecular biology and a number of special courses for students of the biological faculty of the Kazakh State University.

Under the leadership of Aitkhozhin, a set of instruments for the automation of molecular biological experiments was developed, which was protected by 15 copyright certificates and 16 patents in leading countries.

== Contribution to Public life ==
Along with science, Murat Aitkhozhin also took part in the party life of the country. Murat Aitkhozhin was elected a deputy of the Supreme Soviet of the USSR of the 11th convocation (Soviet of the Union) from the Chapaevsky constituency of the Ural region and a delegate to the XXVII Congress of the Communist Party of the Soviet Union.

Murat Aitkhozhin was a member of the Soviet Peace Fund, and was appointed Chairman of the Republican branch of the Soviet Peace Fund in 1981. Furthermore, he was appointed to the Presidium of the Academy of Sciences of the Kazakh SSR (in 1981). Along with future President of Kazakhstan, Nursultan Nazarbayev, Aitkhozhin was in the Kazakh delegation to Latvia in 1977. He was awarded the Gold Medal of the Soviet Peace Fund in 1987 as well as the Order of the Friendship of Peoples.

He was one of the signatories of the article “We Are Bitter” in the newspaper “Evening Alma-Ata” dated 12/27/1986 in which he condemned the actions of the Jheltoqsans, quote “..What right were these hooligans, most of whom were under the influence of alcohol and drugs ..." However, his colleague, M. K. Gilmanov believes that Aitkhozhin was forced to sign this article, perhaps due to his membership in the Kazakh national-patriotic organisation "Zhas Tulpar" in his youth, and his support of the Kazakh language in science.

Murat Aitkhozhin was in 1983–1987 a member of the Lenin Komsomol Prize Award Committee in the field of science and technology and in 1986-1987 he was chairman of the Committee on State Prizes in Science and Technology under the Council of Ministers of the Kazakh SSR. He was chairman of the scientific council on physical and chemical biology at the Presidium of the Academy of Sciences of the Kazakh SSR, member of the editorial Board of the Union journals “Molecular biology”, “Biopolymers and cell”, was the editor-in-chief of the journal “Bulletin of the Kazakh SSR”.

== Awards ==
- Jubilee Medal "For Valiant labour - In Commemoration of the 100th Anniversary of the Birth of Vladimir Ilyich Lenin" (1970).
- Is entered in the Golden Book of Honour of the Kazakh SSR (1974).
- Lenin Prize (1976) - for the series of works "The discovery of informosomes - a new class of intracellular particles."
- Certificate of Honour of the Supreme Soviet of the Kazakh SSR (1981).
- Gold Medal of the Soviet Peace Fund (1987).
- Order of the Friendship of Peoples (1987).

== Legacy ==
Named after Academician Murat Aitkhozhin:

- Secondary school number 1 in Petropavlovsk.
- Institute of Molecular Biology and Biochemistry of the Academy of Sciences of Kazakhstan.
- 2 scholarships for graduate students of the Academy of Sciences of Kazakhstan in the field of biology.
- Prize for young scientists of the Academy of Sciences of Kazakhstan in the field of biological sciences.
- A commemorative plaque adorns the building of the house where Murat Aitkhozhin lived.
- On the occasion of the 60th anniversary of Murat Aitkhozhin, a memorial museum was created at the Institute of Molecular Biology and Biochemistry to commemorate his life and works.

In 2016, Murat Aitkhozhin was chosen as one of the nominees in the "Science" category of the national project «El Tulgasy» (Name of the Motherland) The idea of the project was to select the most significant and famous citizens of Kazakhstan whose names are now associated with the achievements of the country. More than 350,000 people voted in this project, and Aitkhozhin was voted into 5th place in his category.

== Scientific Work ==
- Aitkhozhin M. A. Molecular mechanisms of plant protein biosynthesis: Fav. tr - Alma-Ata: Science of the Kazakh SSR, 1989 .-- 287 p. - ISBN 5-628-00381-6 .
- Aitkhozhin M. A. Ribonucleoprotein particles of higher plants: Abstract. dis. ... Dr. Biol. sciences. - Moscow, 1976.- 44 p.
- Aitkhozhin M.A., Azimuratova R. Zh., Kim T.N., Darkanbaev T.B. Isolation and characterization of fast-flowing fractions of Aspergillus Niger cytoplasm RNA // Biochemistry. - 1972. - T. 37, No. 6 . - S. 1276-1281 .
- Aitkhozhin M.A., Beklemishev A.V., Nazarova L.M., Filimonov N.G. Functional activity of heterologous ribosomes // Dokl. USSR Academy of Sciences. - 1972. - T. 203, No. 6 . - S. 1403-1404 .
- Aitkhozhin M.A., Belitsina N.V., Spirin A.S. Nucleic acids in the early stages of embryo development in fish (on the example of the loach Misgurnus fossilis) // Biochemistry. - 1964. - T. 29, No. 1 . - S. 169-175 .
- Aitkhozhin M.A., Iskakov B.K. Plant Informosomes. - Alma-Ata: Science, 1982. - 182 p.
- Belitsina N.V., Aitkhozhin M.A., Gavrilova L.P., Spirin A.S. Information ribonucleic acids of differentiating animal cells // Biochemistry. - 1964. - T. 29, No. 2 . - S. 363-374 .
- Doshchanov Kh.I., Pushkarev V.M., Polimbetova N.S., Aitkhozhin M.A. Liberation of informosomes from isolated nuclei of wheat germ in the in vitro system // Molec. biology. - 1981. - T. 15, No. 1 . - S. 72-78 .
- Iskakov B.K. and Aitkhozhin M.A. Proteins of informosomes associated with polyribosomes from germinating wheat germ // Molec. biology. - 1979. - T. 13, No. 5 . - S. 1124-1129 .
- Methods of molecular biology, biochemistry and plant biotechnology: [Sat. Art.] / Resp. ed. M.A. Aitkhozhin, H.I. Doshchanov. - Alma-Ata: Science of the Kazakh SSR, 1988 .-- 165 p. - ISBN 5-628-00093-0 .
- Spirin A.S., Belitsina N.V., Aitkhozhin M.A. Information RNA in early embryogenesis // Zh. total biol. - 1964. - T. 25, No. 5 . - S. 321-338 .
- Spirin A.S., Belitsina N.V., Aitkhozhin M.A. (Spirin AS, Belitsina NV, Aitkhozhin MA). Messenger RNA in early embryogenesis (Eng.) // Fed. Proc. Transl. Suppl. - 1965. - Vol. 24, no. 5 . - P. 907-915 .
- Filimonov N.G., Aitkhozhin M.A. Poly-A-protein complexes in the polyribosomes of germinating wheat germ // Biochemistry. - 1978. - T. 43, No. 6 . - S. 1062-1066 .
- Filimonov N.G., Aitkhozhin M.A., Gazaryan K.G. Poly (A) -containing RNA from germinating wheat germ // Molec. biology. - 1978. - T. 12, No. 3 . - S. 522-526 .
- Filimonov N.G., Martakova N.A., Popov L.S., Tarantul V.Z., Aitkhozhin M.A. Organization of nucleotide sequences of nuclear DNA of wheat germ // Biochemistry. - 1982. - T. 47, No. 7 . - S. 1198-1207 .
- Shakulov R.S., Aitkhozhin M.A., Spirin A.S. // Biochemistry. - 1962. - T. 27, No. 4 . - S. 744–751.

Preceded by Askar Kunaev	President of the Kazakh Academy of Sciences; April 21, 1986 - December 19, 1987	Succeeded by Umirzak Sultangazin
