= Almaty Botanical Garden =

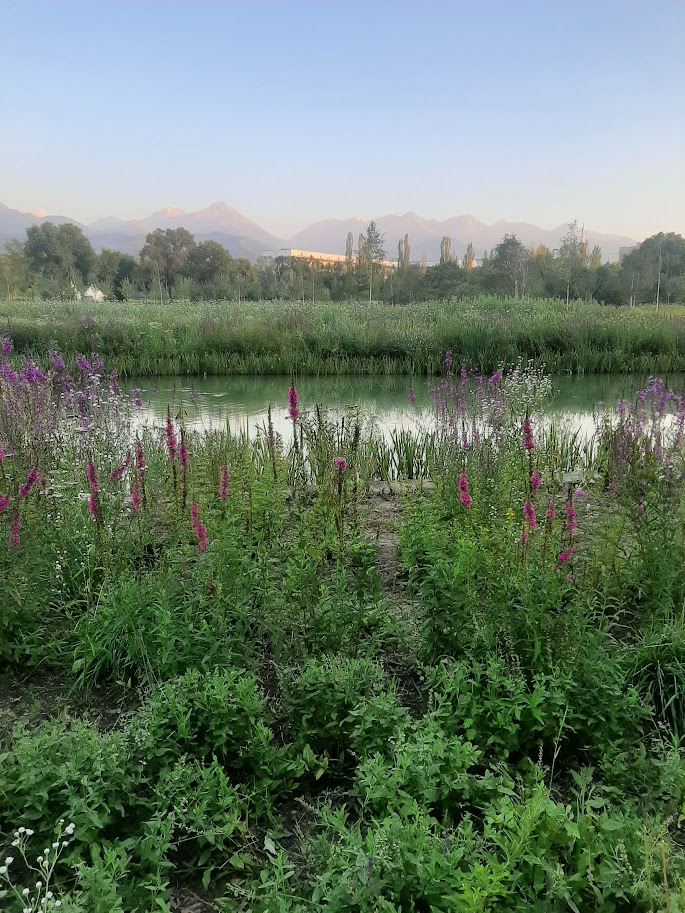
- Interactive map of Almaty Botanical Garden
- Type: Garden
- Location: Almaty, Kazakhstan
- Coordinates: 43°13′30″N 76°54′54″E
- Area: 103.6 ha (256 acres)
- Opened: 1932
- Website: botsad.kz

Almaty Botanical Garden (Kazakh: Алматы ботаникалық бағы) is the main botanical garden of Almaty, Kazakhstan.

Owned by the Republican "Institute of Botany and Phytointroduction" of the Committee of Science of the Ministry of Education and Science, it was founded in 1932 on an area of 108 hectares. In 1967, it was given the status of a research institution. In 2006, the Botanical Garden was included in the list of "Specially Protected Natural Areas of the Republic of Kazakhstan" (SPNA), which made it possible to stop the further sale of the garden land for construction.

== History ==
On March 14, 1932, the presidium of the USSR Academy of Sciences decided to organize the Kazakhstan base of the USSR Academy of Sciences with the botanical sector and the zoological sector and the creation of the botanical garden.

On December 15, 1933, the presidium approved the structure of the Kazakhstan base, which included the botanical sector with the botanical garden.

In 1943, the Soil-Botanical Institute of the Kazakh branch of the USSR Academy of Sciences was established on the basis of the soil and botanical sectors.

In 1945, the Soil-Botanical Institute was divided into the Institute of Soil Science and the Institute of Botany.

In 1946, by the decision of the Presidium of the Kazakh SSR Academy of Sciences on October 5, 1946, the botanical garden was reorganized into an independent research institution of national importance with direct subordination to the Presidium of the Kazakh SSR Academy of Sciences as the Institute – the Republican Botanical Garden.

In 1953, by the decree of the Presidium of the Academy of Sciences of the Kazakh SSR from September 21, 1953, the "State Republican Botanical Garden" was renamed the "Alma-Ata Botanical Garden".

In 1963, the decree of the Presidium of the Academy of Sciences of the Kazakh SSR on March 22, 1963, "Alma-Ata botanical garden" was transferred to the Institute of Botany.

In 1965, by the decree of the general meeting of the Academy of Sciences of the Kazakh SSR from January, 27th, 1965, the Main botanical garden on the basis of the "Alma-Ata botanical garden of the Institute of Botany" was organized as an independent research institute.

In 1995, the decision of the Presidium of the National Academy of Sciences of Kazakhstan on May 5, 1995, was merged with the Institute of Botany "and Research Institute of" Main Botanical Gardens "in" the Institute of Botany and Phytointroduction of Kazakhstan Academy of Sciences ". Currently, the Institute of Botany and Phytointroduction is under the jurisdiction of the Committee of Forestry and Wildlife of the Ministry of Ecology, Geology and Natural Resources of the Republic of Kazakhstan.

== Threat of liquidation ==
With the collapse of the Soviet Union, the territory of the Almaty Botanical Garden, located in the elite district of the city, became interesting to big businessmen-developers. In order to freely take possession of the state land of the garden, its territory was transferred from the republican jurisdiction (ownership) to the municipal jurisdiction of the city authorities (akimat). In the early 2000s, after the transfer of the territory into municipal ownership, the Almaty Botanical Garden was on the verge of elimination. Several hectares of land were alienated with the permission of the new owners (the akimat of the city). There were plans to sell the entire territory of the botanical garden for the construction of an elite cottage city, an entertainment center, a residential complex and to lay through it the highways of Baizakov and Manas streets. But since 2006, in connection with the official inclusion of the territory of the Almaty botanical garden in the list of "Specially Protected Natural Areas of National importance" and return to the republican property, the sale and development of the territory of the garden became impossible. However, attempts to take over the territory of the garden have not stopped.

In 2015, oligarch-developer Serzhan Zhumashev became interested in the Botanical Garden, who through his "Fund for the Development of the Main Botanical Garden" offered to sponsor the reconstruction of the garden and build an art museum from the side of Al-Farabi Avenue.

In 2018, another businessman oligarch, Bulat Utemuratov, became interested in botanical garden, and through his "B. Utemuratov Foundation" he intended to reconstruct the garden. At the same time, the akimat of the city stated that it intended to take the botanical garden back into municipal ownership.

== Location ==
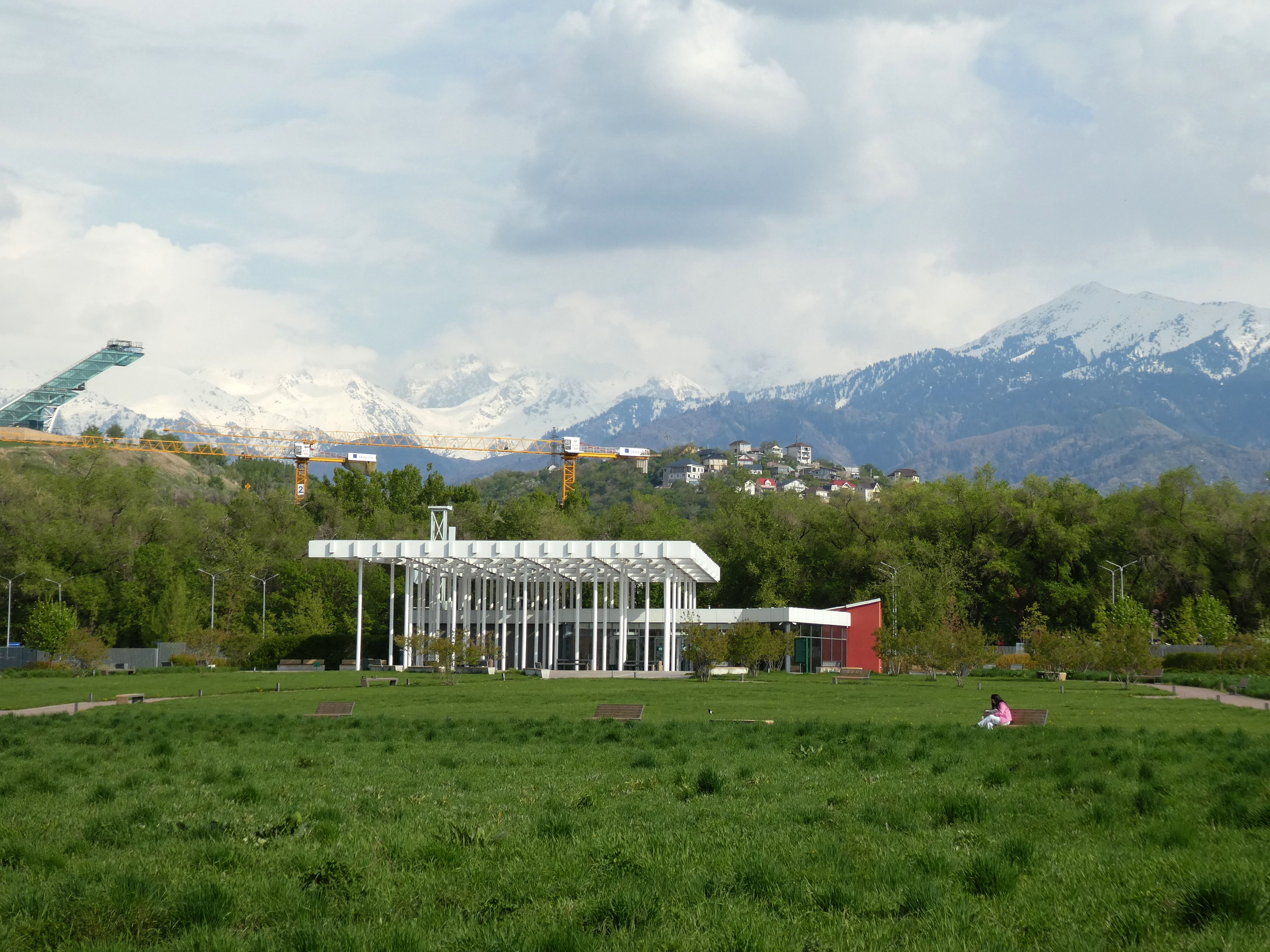
Southern entrance to the garden

The garden is located in the southern part of Almaty at an altitude of 856–906 meters above sea level. Currently, its area is 103.6 hectares.

== Area ==
At the time of its foundation in 1932, the garden's area was 108 hectares. In 2006, it was 104 hectares. Nowadays, it is 103.6 hectares. After 2006, from the territory of the garden despite its status as a protected area, part of the garden area was alienated in an unknown way.

== Exposition ==
As of 1982, the expositions (flora of Kazakhstan, the European part of the USSR, Siberia and the Far East, Crimea and the Caucasus, North America, East Asia) were arranged according to the botanical-geographical principle, and the placement of plants was according to the park-landscape principle. The collection contained over 7 thousand species of plants, varieties and forms, including flora of Kazakhstan - 375, foreign plants of the USSR - 453, foreign - 872.

Botanical Garden had plant departments: flora and ecology, woody, decorative and floral, tropical, food and medicinal and technical reproduction and protection of introduced plants, and a laboratory of plant physiology and biology. Scientists develop the problem of introduction and acclimatization of plants in Kazakhstan, study plant resources of the Republic, identify and cultivate economically valuable species. They handed over for landscaping of the city more than 100 species, 46 forms and 15 varieties of plants of different geographical origin.

Research Institute Main Botanical Garden coordinated the activities of 5 botanical gardens of Kazakhstan - Karaganda, Zhezkazgan, Altai, Iliysk and Mangyshlak. There was an exchange of scientific literature, planting material, seeds with 108 botanical gardens in 48 countries.

Sak mound is located in the Main Botanical Garden of the National Academy of Sciences of the Republic of Kazakhstan, 600 meters south of the Botanical Garden management, 200 meters from the southwest greenhouse, to the right of the central alley, 800 meters above Timiryazev Street.

== Management ==
In Soviet times, the Main Botanical Garden was subordinate to the Academy of Sciences of the Republic, with the collapse of the USSR transferred to the Ministry of Education and Science.

== Funding ==
Each year, more than 89 million tenge is allocated for the maintenance of the Botanical Garden by the Ministry of Education and Science of the Republic of Kazakhstan.

=== Reconstruction ===
In 2017, more than 100 million tenge was allocated by the Ministry of Education and Science of Kazakhstan for the reconstruction of the Botanical Garden, including the development of a topographic survey, design and drilling of a well, installation of fencing for collection funds, installation of video surveillance and construction of a new greenhouse.

In 2018, during the garden's renovation, with funds from the Bulat Utemuratov Private Charitable Foundation, specialists from the Institute of Botany and Phytointroduction planted more than 1,300 trees, 40,000 shrubs, 130,000 herbs and perennials, and 3,000 roses. A new parterre with a pergola, a herbaceous field, and three ponds was arranged in the southern part. Throughout the territory, roads and pedestrian paths were renewed, tactile markings for people with disabilities were installed, and 3 entrance pavilions with equipped cash registers and sanitary facilities were built.

== Issues and corruption ==
Despite the multimillion annual funding from the national budget and an increase in its volume allocated for the maintenance of the "Institute of Botany", which includes the Almaty Botanical Garden, some of the garden's problems have not been solved for decades.

In 2007, a botanical scientist, Nugman Aralbay, was appointed director of the "Institute of Botany", who, upon assuming his post, immediately began taking measures to solve the botanical garden's current problems. However, his good intentions were immediately opposed. Nugman Aralbay hired a company through a tender to clean 25 hectares of the garden for only 3 million tenge, while the internal norms approved by the former leadership of the Institute of Botany and KN MES RK, he had to spend 25 million tenge. This fact of savings did not please the higher management of the KN MES, apparently because the savings could have gone for the necessary solution to the unsolved problems of the garden for years. An inspection commission was immediately appointed from Astana on this fact, but, nevertheless, the commission refused to sign a negative act. After that, the pressure on Nugman Aralbay only increased, a series of inspections from the prosecutor's office, financial control and commissions from the Ministry of Education and Science of the Republic of Kazakhstan were arranged. It got to the point that Aralbay was accused of theft of 11 million tenge, according to the report of the ministerial inspection, but no evidence of violations was provided. On September 17, 2008, the economic court ruled that the act of the financial control inspection was illegal and the inspection was conducted with numerous violations. But despite the court's decision, Aralbay was reprimanded several times and fired. Aralbay did not agree with the dismissal, filed a lawsuit, tried to reinstate him in his position, but the Ministry of Education and Science of Kazakhstan did not respond.

In 2014-2015, the former director of the Institute of Botany Aralbay Nugman sent open letters of appeal to the current director of the Institute of Botany Sitpaeva G.T., as well as the chairman of the Committee of Science of the MES of the Republic of Kazakhstan Mr. Zholdasbaev S.I., in which he cited facts of inaction Sitpaeva G.T. as head of the enterprise, which led to the decline of the Institute, despite the 10-fold increase in funding in 2014. In his opinion, the results of the inaction of Sitpayeva G. T. led to: 1) the integrity and consistency of the herbarium fund was violated; 2) part of the herbarium and the collection of fossil plants were lost; 3) the collection of living plants (introductants) of the Main Botanical Garden was lost by 63%, as confirmed by a letter from Acting Chairman A. Tuleshov № ZT-C-63/7, ZT-C-63/7/1 of 06. 01.01.2014; 4) ignored not executed the order of the Prosecutor General's Office of the RK to bring the status of the Main, Zhezkazgan and Iliysk botanical gardens in line with the requirements of the laws of the RK; 5) 815 million tenge of budget funds in 2014 were used irrationally. However, since the time of sending his appeal to the Ministry of Education and Science of the Republic of Kazakhstan, all deadlines established by law to consider appeals of individuals have passed. The Committee of Science never responded to Aralbay's appeal. Thus, he did not refute the facts he cited.

== Laboratories ==
=== Laboratory of dendrology ===
The first arboretum was founded in 1939. In 1945 the first guidebook on the botanical garden was published. From 1956 to 1965 the department worked on the theme "Creation of expositions of plant areas". Currently, a collection of woody plants botanical garden is collected on the botanical-geographical principle. Created 5 expositions: "Kazakhstan", "Europe, Crimea, Caucasus", "East Asia", "North America", "Siberia, the Far East" and 4 specialized collection areas: "Coniferetum", "Syringarium", "climbing woody plants" and "hazelnuts. Collection Fund of woody plants in 2011 is 895 taxa from 49 families and 129 genera growing on an area of 42 hectares. The main activities of the laboratory are: development of scientific basis for the formation and creation of collection funds of woody plants of domestic and world flora in the open field conditions of foothills of Zailiisky Alatau; introduction tests of plants, development of assortment of plants and scientific recommendations for their effective use in landscaping Almaty and other cities of Kazakhstan; study of intraspecific diversity of woody plants.

=== Laboratory of seed production and plant protection ===
The Seed Research Group was organized in 1934. One part of the botanical garden's introductive work is the issuing, receiving and distributing of seeds, which is done in exchange through seed catalogs and scientific and reference correspondence, which was carried out by the staff of the Seed Group. The first seed catalog (No. 1) was published in 1934. It included 356 species of mostly herbaceous plants, of which 64 species were collected by I. A. Lincevsky in the Talas Alatau. The Plant Protection Group was organized at the Botanical Garden in 1970, which assesses the phytosanitary status of introductory plants in the Botanical Gardens of Kazakhstan. In 2013, these groups were merged into the Laboratory of Seed Production and Plant Protection and under the state scientific and technical program "Botanical diversity of wild relatives of cultivated plants of Kazakhstan as a source of enrichment and conservation of the gene pool of agrobiodiversity to implement the Food Program" the work on creation of the Seed Bank of wild relatives of cultivated plants was started. The laboratory is in charge of: Seed bank of wild relatives of cultivated plants, occupying an area of 92 m2; which has: a drying room 12 m2, a refrigerator 32 m3. Over three years, two collections of seeds have been collected and planted: long-term (basic) and short-term (active). Reproduction nursery of rare fruit plants on an area of 1 hectare was established.

=== Laboratory of introduction of floral and ornamental plants in open and closed soil ===
Laboratory of ornamental floral plants in the open ground has been founded since the establishment of the Main Botanical Garden of the Academy of Sciences in 1932. Indoor is represented by the exposition greenhouse and experimental-production greenhouse. The Greenhouse and Greenhouse complex was put into exploitation in 1969 for the purpose of introduction of tropical and subtropical plants in confined conditions. The number of the open-air and closed-air plant collection is about 600 species. The result of selection and cytogenetic work has been obtained 18 new varieties of freesia and 15 varieties of roses. The main fund of outdoor plants includes plants that survive the winter of Almaty. Many plants are drought and heat tolerant. The assortment was also improved in terms of making flower beds cheaper by including highly economical unpretentious rhizomatous perennials in them. Attention is paid to the ways of using introductions in floral design.

Over the years of introductory work 300 species of plants were tested and 7 species of tropical and subtropical plants were introduced into production.

The main scientific directions of the laboratory of floral and ornamental plants introduction are the development of biological bases of indoor and outdoor plants culture in Kazakhstan. The work consists in: finding effective ways of accelerated reproduction of hard-to-root and promising plant species, attracting new species, varieties and forms of plants from leading botanical centers of the world to the collection, ensuring the viability of the collection fund, the selection of commercially valuable range of plants for phytodesign of interiors and ensuring the cutting of flowers in winter and early spring periods, improving the range of heat-resistant geophytes by breeding methods.

=== Laboratory of Environmental Plant Morphology ===
The Laboratory of Ecological Morphology was organized in 1986 on the initiative and under the leadership of Academician Baitulin Isa Omarovich, who headed it until 2006. The main activity of the laboratory is fundamental research, which is aimed at studying the adaptive features of perennial plants of mountain regions of Kazakhstan in natural habitats and at introduction. The objects of research are, first of all, rare species included in the Red Books, the situation of which in nature causes concern for their preservation. Much attention is paid to useful and ornamental plants, which are rich in Kazakhstan's flora. The exposition of the laboratory "Alpinarium" presents about 200 species of native flora and over 100 species and varieties widely used in culture of herbaceous perennials and miniature shrubs. In the last three years alone, 90 plant species belonging to 26 families and 52 genera have been introduced into the Alpinarium collection by seeds and live plants. To date, the collection of "Alpinarium" has 32 rare species of Kazakh flora, mainly of mountain habitats of the Northern Tien Shan.

=== Laboratory of higher plant flora ===
The Laboratory of Flora, formerly the Department of Flora of Higher Plants, was established in 1946 as part of the Institute of Botany at the Academy of Sciences of the Kazakh SSR. The traditional direction of research is floristics and systematics of plants, inventory and assessment of species diversity of plants of different regions of Kazakhstan; assessment of the current state of flora; solving theoretical issues of evolution of floras and individual taxa; work related to monographic processing of individual systematic groups of plants of Kazakhstan, creation of plant cadasters of different regional confinement; issues of protection and creation of regional "Red Books". The Laboratory is in charge of the Herbarium Fund, which was founded in 1933 by the prominent scientist M.G. Popov on the basis of the herbarium of the Regional Museum of Semirechye. At the present time the Herbarium is included in the list of the most important botanical collections of the CIS countries and has an international index AA. The Herbarium is the only depository of botanical collections in the Republic, where the richest flora of Kazakhstan is most fully represented. The Herbarium of types, represented by more than 350 taxa, is especially highlighted[21]. Of particular value are the collections collected in 1840-1860 by prominent scientists-botanists A. I. Shrenk, T. S. Karelin, I. P. Kirilov, I. G. Borshchov. Herbarium fund was created by the work of five generations of botanists. The herbarium was replenished with collections of internationally renowned scientists N. Pavlov, M. G. Popov, G. K. Shishkin, and P. P. Polyakov. Further collectors were V. P. Goloskokov, I. I. Roldugin, Z. V. Kubanskaya, B. A. Bykov, M. S. Baitenov, N. H. Karmysheva, A. P. Gamayunova, N. S. Filatova, A. N. Vasilyeva, A. O. Orazova, V. G. Tsagolova. Currently, the Herbarium of the Institute of Botanical Garden contains 250 thousand herbarium specimens of mosses, ferns, gymnosperms, and angiosperms.

In 2015, it became known that the integrity and consistency of the herbarium fund is broken, part of the herbarium and the collection of fossil plants are lost.

The herbarium is the foundation of botanical research. The preservation and constant reference to herbarium materials gives an opportunity to track changes, migration, transformation of flora and vegetation, both in a particular territory and in Kazakhstan as a whole. Only based on documented herbarium material, it is possible to reliably conduct floristic and ecological monitoring studies.

=== Laboratory of Plant Resources ===
The Laboratory of Plant Resources was established in 1956 on the initiative of Valentina Pavlovna Mikhailova, Doctor of Biological Sciences, who headed the laboratory in 1956-1975. Her name is associated with the formation and further development of botanical-resource studies, as well as the formation of a school of resource scientists in the Republic. From 1976 to 1997 the laboratory was headed by Madeniet Karataevich Kukenov, corresponding member of National Academy of Sciences of Kazakhstan, Doctor of Biological Sciences. M.K. Kukenov and laboratory staff carried out extensive work on the inventory of medicinal flora of the south-east of Kazakhstan. The main activities of the laboratory are: Resource: systematic and consistent study of plant resources of useful plants of Kazakhstan for the conservation and balanced use of botanical diversity at the level of ecosystems, communities, populations and individual species of medicinal plants. Induction: scientific basis of management for the rational use, enrichment of the gene pool, creation of technologies of introduction into culture and reproduction of plants: collection, experimental and experimental-production cultivation of medicinal and aromatic plants, maintenance and replenishment of the collection of medicinal plants of local and world flora. Applied: development of recommendations on the regime of norms of withdrawal of raw materials during economic use of the identified commercial massifs (% of withdrawal, identification of reserves of raw materials of useful plants, first of all, medicinal and aromatic in order to provide the domestic pharmaceutical industry with raw materials).

=== Laboratory of gene pool protection and introduction of fruit plants ===
The Laboratory of Gene Pool Protection and Introduction of Fruit Plants was established in 1970. The first head and organizer of the laboratory was Academician of the National Academy of Sciences of Kazakhstan, Honored Scientist, Doctor of Biological Sciences, Professor Aymak Djangaliev (from 1970-2005). The main activities of the laboratory are: conservation and effective in situ restoration, rational use in culture of globally unique Kazakh species of Sivers apple and Common apricot and other accompanying useful plants; ex-situ conservation of selected economically valuable forms of Sivers apple and Common apricot and other wild fruit plants; biochemical evaluation of fruit raw materials of wild fruit plants for the content of biologically active substances and antioxidant activity.

=== Laboratory of Mycology and Algology ===
In 1943, Sofia Ruvinovna Shvartsman established the Department of Spore Plants in the Botanical Sector of the Kazakh Branch of the USSR Academy of Sciences. In 1966, the Laboratory of Spore Plant Biology was separated from the Department of Spore Plants, under the direction of Dr. B.K. Kalimbetov, but in 1978 both laboratories were reunited into one department, the Department of Systematics of lower plants (Head - M.P. Vasyagina, Candidate of Biological Sciences). In 1981 this department was divided into two: the Department of Systematics and Geography of Lower Plants (Head - Candidate of Biological Sciences M.P. Vasyagina) and the Laboratory of Spore Plant Biology (Head - Candidate of Agricultural Sciences S.A. Abiev). In 1985 two laboratories were established from the laboratory of spore plant biology: experimental mycology (supervisor - candidate of agricultural sciences S. A. Abiev) and experimental hydrobotany (supervisor - doctor of biological sciences T. T. Taubaev). In 1995, due to reunification of the Institute of Botany and the Main Botanical Garden, all three laboratories of the Institute of Botany and the GBS Plant Protection Group were united into the Laboratory of Spore Plants, which was headed by Prof. S.A. Abiev until 2005, and since 2005 - by Dr. G.A. Nam. Since 2009 the Laboratory of Spore Plants was renamed to the Laboratory of Mycology and Algology. The main activities of the laboratory are: studying the diversity of fungi and algae, identifying rare, endemic and endangered species in Kazakhstan, distribution and distribution to ecological niches, and their confinement to substrates, dynamics of development, seasonality; studies of fungi pathogens at the ultrastructural level; preservation of herbarium collections of fungi and mycelial cultures; cultivation of fruit bodies and sowing mycelium of edible mushrooms.

=== Laboratory of geobotany ===
Geobotanical research in Kazakhstan began in 1920, they have been systematically developed since 1932 with the organization of the Botanical Sector of the Kazakhstan branch of the USSR Academy of Sciences. The Department of Geobotany was organized in 1945. In 1976 the department was divided into two laboratories: geobotany and ecology and vegetation protection. In 1989 the laboratory of phytoecological mapping was organized. In 1995 all three laboratories were merged into one - Laboratory of Geobotany. The main activities of the Laboratory are: ecological-phytocenotic studies; botanical-geographical studies; vegetation and ecosystems mapping; vegetation dynamics; assessment of anthropogenic transformation of vegetation; study of botanical diversity on species, phytocoenotic, ecosystem and landscape levels of organization; phytomelioration of disturbed vegetation.

== Branches ==
- Jezqazgan Botanical Garden
- Iliysk botanical garden
- Astana Botanical Garden

== Administration ==
- Aralbay Nugman Kuldarbekuly - from 2007 to September 2008
- Gulnara Tokbergenovna Sitpaeva - September 2008 to present

== Ticket price ==
From April 10, 2021 the cost of adult ticket to the Botanical Garden will be 900 tenge, student ticket - 630 tenge, pensioners and schoolchildren can visit the botanical garden for 450 tenge.

This price includes the use of specially protected natural areas, which include the Botanical Garden, at a rate of 0.1 MCI (291.7 tenge).
