= Aymak Djangaliev =

Kazakhstani biologist

Aymak Djangalievich Djangaliev (Russian: Аймак Джангалиевич Джангалиев, Kazakh: Аймақ Жанғалиұлы Жанғалиев, 15 August 1913 – 21 June 2009) was a Kazakh pomologist. Along with Nikolai Vavilov, he helped identify the forests of wild apples in Kazakhstan as the origin of the domesticated apple. Following Vavilov's arrest in 1940 for, among other things, his support of Mendelian genetics, which Stalin opposed, Djangaliev continued his work in secret, eventually working to protect and preserve the Kazakh apple forests after the dissolution of the Soviet Union.

== Life ==
Djangaliev was born in Ashchisay in western Kazakhstan and was orphaned at a young age; his parents died in the Russian Revolution. After the death of his parents, he was raised by his older sister and was sent to the first Kazakh experimental boarding school in Almaty. He graduated from the Kazakh Agricultural Institute in 1935 and worked as an agronomist in southern Kazakhstan.

Djangaliev spent his career studying Malus species in Central Asia, beginning with the Kazakh population of Malus sieversii in 1930. He met Vavilov, who dedicated his life to studying the apple forests of Kazakhstan, and continued studying the origin of apples after Vavilov's imprisonment in 1943. Djangaliev's work was interrupted by his serving in an anti-aircraft battery during World War II, during which he was awarded the Order of the Great Patriotic War. Vavilov's work with Djangaliev and his other students remained hidden for nearly half a century until the dissolution of the Soviet Union; during this time, Djangaliev continued his work in virtual obscurity in Almaty, having narrowly escaped Soviet persecution himself.

In 1989 and 1993, Djangaliev, now a professor of biological sciences at the Kazakhstan Academy of Sciences, organized exploration trips with American pomologists including Herb Aldwinckle, then the chair of the Apple Crop Advisory Committee. Djangaliev, one of Vavilov's last surviving students, and American botanist Calvin Sperling initiated a research project to identify, collect, and measure the rich genetic diversity of wild Malus populations, sharing the germplasm between the American and Kazakh researchers. The project also published two of Djangaliev's most important works in English for the first time in the journal Horticultural Reviews.

== Personal life ==
While defending his PhD thesis at Moscow Agricultural Academy, he met and married his wife, Sofya Nikolaevna, a hereditary noblewoman.

== Legacy ==
After Djangaliev's death in 2010, French director Catherine Peix produced the documentary Les Origines de la pomme, introducing Djangaliev's work to study and preserve the Kazakh wild apple forests.

In April 2019, the Kazakh Research Institute of Horticulture was renamed after Djangaliev at the dedication of its 60th anniversary.
