= Satbayev Memorial Museum =

Museum in Kazakhstan

Coordinates: 43°14′36″N 76°56′56″E

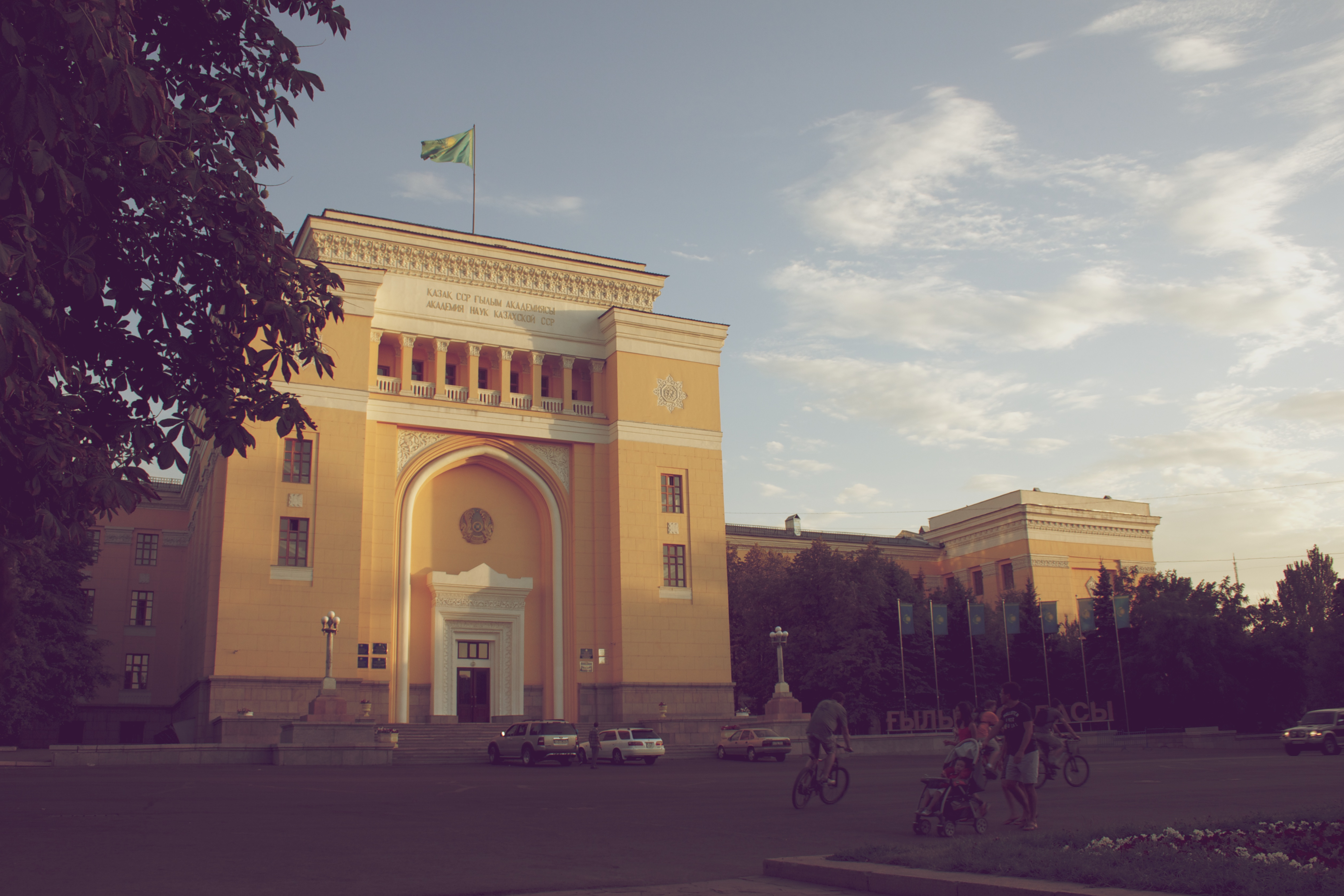
- Established: 1989
- Location: Gylym Ordasy, Almaty

The Satbayev Memorial Museum (Russian: Мемориальный музей Сатпаева, tr. memorialnii muzey satpaieva) is a museum dedicated to Kazakh scientist Kanysh Satbayev, academician of the Kazakh Soviet Socialist Republic Academy of Sciences, in Almaty, Kazakhstan.

== History ==
The memorial house-museum dedicated to Kazakh academician Kanysh Satbayev was opened in 1989, as part of the celebrations of his 90th birthday. First Secretary of the Central Committee of the Communist Party of Kazakhstan Nursultan Nazarbayev took part in the opening of the museum. The exhibition covered Satbayev's work as a scientist.

In 2009, the museum moved to the Gylym Ordasy complex, the building of the Academy of Sciences of Kazakhstan, where a completely renewed exposition was created.

== Museum exposition ==
The new museum includes three halls with expositions and one memorial hall. The memorial hall displays a recreation of Satbayev's study with authentic furnishings. The exposition of the first three halls contains displays related to Satbayev's childhood, his work, and his contribution to the development of Kazakhstan's economy, science and culture. His work in organizing Kazakhstan's geological service, and the formation of the pioneers of Kazakhstani industry in such cities as Jezkazgan, Karaganda, Guryev and others are covered. Particular attention is paid to the history of the organization and formation of the Academy of Sciences of the Republic of Kazakhstan. The museum organizes an annual event in April to commemorate Satbayev's birth, titled "Decades of memory of the great Kazakh scientist", attended by scientists, geologists, students and schoolchildren.

The museum also holds special expositions. The 20 anniversary of the Assembly of People of Kazakhstan and the 550th anniversary of the Kazakh Khanate in 2015 was celebrated with an exhibition of national costume. In addition to the outfits of the Kazakh, Russian, Korean and other peoples, the exhibition included part of the collection of clothes of the Kazakh khans, revived on ethnic motifs of the nineteenth century.
