= Nagima Aitkhozhina =

Kazakhstani biologist (1946–2020)

- Нағима Әбенқызы Айтхожина
- Born: Nagima Abenovna Aitkhozhina; 22 February 1946; Petropavl, North Kazakhstan Region, Kazakh SSR
- Died: 10 November 2020 (aged 74); Almaty, Kazakhstan
- Education: Al-Farabi Kazakh National University; Engelhardt Institute of Molecular Biology
- Awards: Order of Parasat; Order of the Leopard, Third Class
- Scientific career
- Fields: Biotechnology; Medical genetics Molecular biology Molecular genetics
- Institutions: Kazakhstan Academy of Sciences

Nagima Abenovna Aitkhozhina (Kazakh: Нағима Әбенқызы Айтхожина; 22 February 1946 – 10 November 2020) was a Kazakh biologist who specialised in the field of molecular biology. She was engaged in the study of the structural and functional organisation of the genome of higher organisms and the molecular mechanisms of regulation of its expression. Aitkhozhina served as general director of the Institute of Molecular Biology and Biochemistry named after M.A. Aitkhozhin of the National Academy of Sciences of the Republic of Kazakhstan from 1990 to 2018, Kazakhstan's first genome laboratory. Between 1999 and 2002, she was president of the Kazakhstan Academy of Sciences. Aitkhozhina was an elected deputy of the Congress of People's Deputies of the Soviet Union from the Committee of Soviet Women from 1989 to 1991. She was decorated with the Order of Parasat in December 2001 and the Order of the Leopard, Third Class ten years later.

== Early life and education ==
Aitkhozhina was born in the city of Petropavl on 22 February 1946. She was a 1969 graduate of the biological faculty of Al-Farabi Kazakh National University. Following her graduation, Aitkhozhina enrolled full-time at the Engelhardt Institute of Molecular Biology of the Academy of Sciences of the Soviet Union to do her post-graduate studies in 1970. She graduated in 1973. Aitkhozhina defended her Doctor of Philosophy thesis Structural and functional organisation of nuclear RNP particles containing pro-mRNA at the university in 1974 and her Doctorate of Biological Sciences thesis called Alkaloids – inhibitors of the biosynthesis of macromolecules in 1990.

== Career ==
Between 1973 and 1983, Aitkozhina was a junior and later senior researcher at the Botany of the Academy of Sciences of the Kazakh SSR. Following the reorganisation of the educational institute, she was then the senior and lead researcher at the Institute of Molecular Biology and Biochemistry of the Academy of Sciences of the Kazakh SSR from 1983 to 1989. Aitkhozhina was acting director of the Institute of Molecular Biology and Biochemistry between 1988 and 1990. She was a member of the Interdepartmental Scientific Council for priority areas of physical and chemical biology and biotechnology of the State Committee for Science and Technology under the Council of Ministers of the USSR, Moscow from 1987 to 1991 and was a member of the Scientific and Technical Council and expert of the projects of the All-Union programme "Priority problems of genetics" in Moscow between 1990 and 1991. Aitkohzhina was a council member of the Republican Council of Women from 1995 onwards. She was a member of the Communist Party of the Soviet Union.

She founded and served as general director of the Institute of Molecular Biology and Biochemistry named after M.A. Aitkhozhin of the National Academy of Sciences of the Republic of Kazakhstan in Alma-Ata from 1990 to 2018, Kazakhstan's first genome laboratory. From 1989 to 1991, Aitkhozhina served as an elected deputy of the Congress of People's Deputies of the Soviet Union from women's councils united by the Committee of Soviet Women, serving as a member on the Science Committee of the Supreme Soviet of the Soviet Union. She became a member of the New York Academy of Sciences in 1994 and was elected Academician-Secretary of the Department of Biological and Medical Sciences of the National Academy of Science in 1996. Aitkhozhina remained in the post until 1999. From January 1999 to April 2002, she served as president of the Kazakhstan Academy of Sciences. Aitkhozhina was an Academician at the Kazakhstan Academy of Sciences in 2003. Aitkhozhina was a member of the International Union of Biochemistry and Molecular Biology.

From 1999 to 2005, she was a member of the National Commission for Family and Women Affairs under the President of the Republic of Kazakhstan and a member of the collegium of the Ministry of Education and Science of the Republic of Kazakhstan between 1999 and 2006. Aidtkohzhina was a member of the editorial board of the Molecular Biology journal from 1996 to 2008 and was an international expert for the International Association for the promotion of cooperation with scientists from the independent states of the former Soviet Union, Brussels from 1998 to 2000. She was a member of the Higher Scientific and Technical Committee (VNTK) under the Government of the Republic of Kazakhstan from 1997 to 2003.

Between 1999 and 2013, Aitkhozhina was a member of the commission that awarded the State Prizes of the Republic of Kazakhstan in science and technology. She chaired the National Coordinating Committee of the Ministry of Environmental Protection of the Republic of Kazakhstan for the development of a framework document for the Republic of Kazakhstan on the biosafety of genetically modified organisms with Global Environment Facility support from 2003 to 2005, the Doctoral Dissertation Council at the Institute in the specialty "Molecular Biology" and "Biochemistry" between 2003 and 2010 and the National Scientific Council of the Republic of Kazakhstan on the priority of "Life Sciences" from 2011 to 2014. Between 2012 and 2015, Aitkhozhina was a member of the Supervisory Board of the PI Center for Life Sciences at Nazarbayev University.

== Works ==
Her primary areas of scientific research were biotechnology, medical genetics, molecular biology and molecular genetics. Aitkhozhina achieved the fundamental and applied results obtained in molecular biotechnology of biomedicine and plants, ethnogenomics on the structural-functions of the genome of higher organisms of humans and plants and the molecular mechanisms of its expression regulation. For the first time, the scheme of RNA bio genesis in the nuclei of eukaryotic cells was taken as a basis and experimentally proved for the first time and it became widely employed in molecular biology and resulted in the forming of the mechanism of RNA processing in higher organisms. She organised the first genome laboratory and was successful in conducting research on the structural-functional organisation of the genome for bio medicine (genomics) for human hereditary and genetic indirect atherogenic diseases, molecular mechanisms of plant resistance to phytopathogens.

Under her leadership, the mummified materials of horses and people's remains from 2,500 years ago that were preserved in artificial frozen conditions were discovered in an archaeological dig in Berel, East Kazakhstan Region. DNA molecular genetic analysis was carried out and a comparative analysis of the DNA of different Kazakh populations was conducted, enabling further research into paleogenomics and ethnogenomics, ethnic history and ethnogenesis of people in Kazakhstan.

She was the author of 92 scientific papers, half of which were published abroad, such as the Biologically active substances of plant origin – low molecular weight bioregulators of the expression of the eukaryotic genome" that Kazakh scientists prioritised. Aitkhozhina's other primary scientific publications were Nuclear ribonucleoproteins containing messenger RNA. Nature of 5,- and 3,-terminal sequences of nuclear RNP particles in 1979, co-wrote Molecular cloning and characterization of individual representatives of the "Relic" fraction of the DNA of the Triticum timopheevii genome in 1988, Selective inhibition of the polypeptide chain elongation in eucaryotic cells in 1992 and Molecular cloning and characteristics of species – specific repetitive sequences of wheat nuclear in 1995.

Aitkhozhina also wrote Biology of cultivated wheat cells exhibited aboard the Mir space station: division, morphogenesis and differentiation in 2001, Polymorphism of the promoter region of the angiotensinogen gene and the gene for angiotensin I-converting enzyme in arterial hypertension and cardiovascular disease of the Kazakh ethnic group in 2003 and Polymorphism of noncoding region of mitochondrial genome from three populations of kazakh groups inhabited territory of Kazakhstan in 2004. She died on the evening of 10 November 2020 in Almaty.

== Awards ==
In December 2001, she was awarded the Order of Parasat from the President of Kazkhastan, and received the Order of the Leopard, Third Class from the President in December 2011. Aitkhozhina was decorated with the Diploma of the Supreme Soviet of the Kazakh SSR, the independent Platinum Tarlan award and the Badge "For merits in the development of science of the Republic of Kazakhstan".

== Attribution ==
- This article incorporates text from a free content work. Licensed under CC-BY-SA-3.0 (license statement/permission). Text taken from Kazakhstan. National encyclopedia, Burkitbai Gelamnovich Ayagan.
