= Satbayev (city) =

Satbayev Сәтбаев Sätbaev
- City
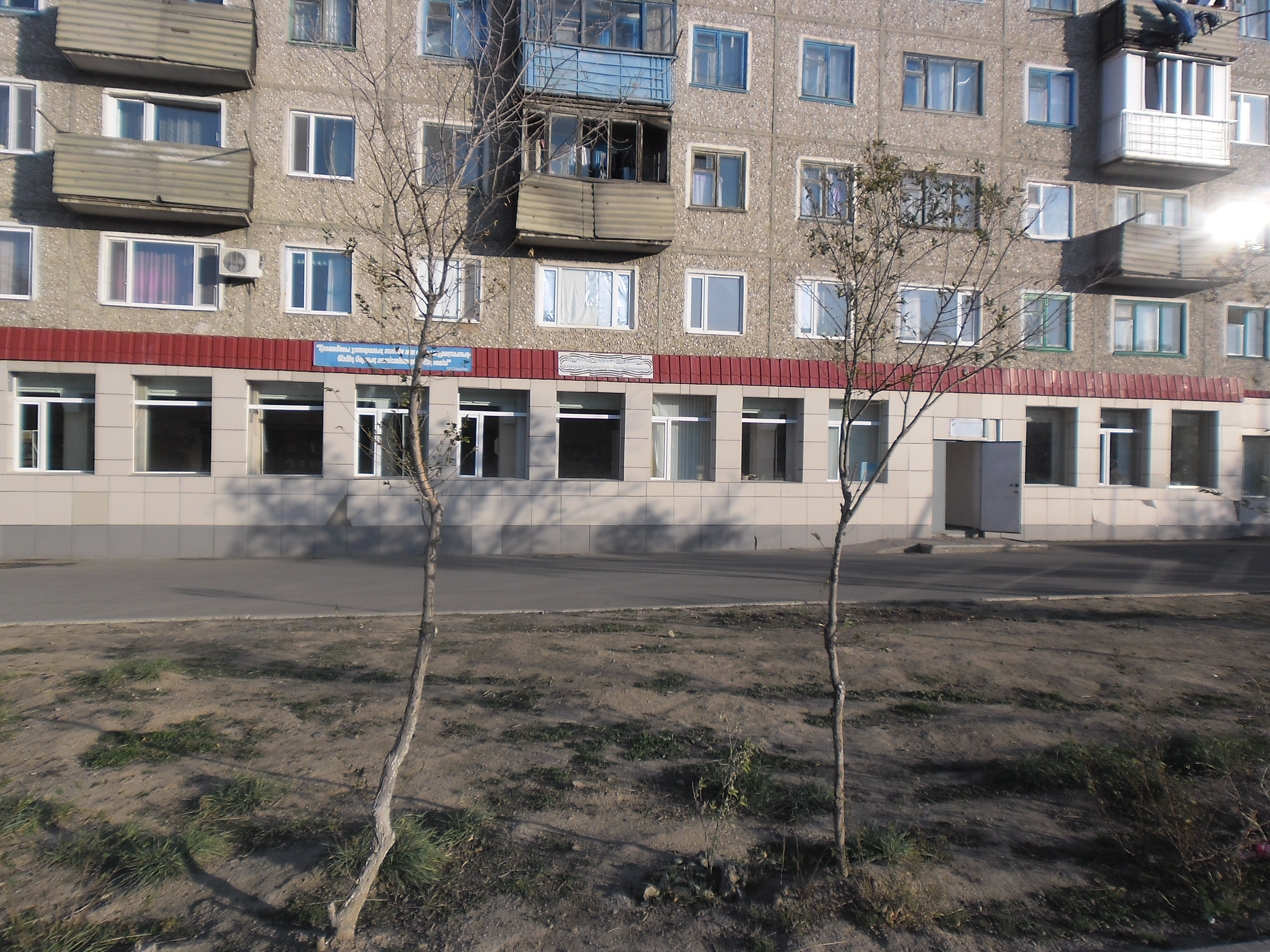

- Coat of arms

- Location in Kazakhstan
- Coordinates: 47°54′0″N 67°32′0″E
- Country: Kazakhstan
- Region: Ulytau Region

Government
  - Akim (mayor): Murat Buribayev

Population (2009)
  - Total: 60,105
- Time zone: UTC+05:00 (Kazakhstan Time)
- Postal code: 101300
- Area code: +7 1063

Satbayev, (Note: /ˌsætˈbaɪɛf/; Kazakh: Сәтбаев, romanized: Sätbaev, IPA: [sætˈpajɪf]; Russian: Сатпаев, romanized: Satpajev, IPA: [sɐtˈpajɪf]) formerly named Nikolsky (Note: /nɪˈkɔːlski/; Russian: Никольский, romanized: Nikoljskij, IPA: [nʲɪˈkolʲsʲkʲɪj]) until 1990, is a city in Ulytau Region, in central Kazakhstan, located outside the city of Zhezqazghan. As of 2019, the city had a population of 69,782.

== Etymology ==
The city is named after Kanysh Satbayev, one of the founders of Soviet metallogeny, principal advocate and the first president of Kazakhstan Academy of Sciences.

== History ==
The city was originally established in 1954 for miners from Jezkazgan. Later, in 1956, it was renamed to Nikolsky. In 1973, Nikolsky received town status. The city got its status by huge exploration work initiated by Kanysh Imantayevich Satpayev. It was given the name Satpayev after him on 13 September 1990. Satbayev is the center of the mining industry.

== Transportation ==
Passenger-train service is provided on the train line between Almaty and Zhezkazgan, a city some twenty kilometers away.

Air traffic is served by the nearby Zhezkazgan Airport.
