= Murat Zhurinov =

- Kazakh: Мұрат Жұрынұлы Жұрынов

Minister of Education of the Republic of Kazakhstan
- In office 1995–1997
- Preceded by: Erezhep Mambetkaziev
- Succeeded by: Imangali Tasmagambetov

Personal details
- Born: 7 December 1941 (age 84) Arys, Kazakh SSR, Soviet Union
- Party: Nur Otan
- Spouse: Maria Nurmaganbetova
- Children: 4
- Education: Auezov South Kazakhstan State University
- Occupation: Politician, Chemist, process engineer

Murat Zhurinov (Kazakh: Мұрат Жұрынұлы Жұрынов, Mūrat Jūrynūly Jūrynov; born 7 December 1941), Arys, South Kazakhstan Region, Kazakh SSR) is a Soviet and Kazakhstani scientist, chemist, former President of the National Academy of Sciences of the Republic of Kazakhstan (2003–2023). Former Minister of Education of Kazakhstan (1995–1997).

== Biography ==
Murat Zhurinov was born in the town of Arys, South Kazakhstan Region on December 7, 1941, to a family of workers.

Having received a degree in process engineering in 1964 at the Kazakh Chemical Technology Institute, he started working in the field of education and science. He began his career as a lecturer at KazCTI (1964–1966). Later he entered full-time postgraduate program at the Moscow Institute of Chemical Technologies, where he defended his PhD thesis in January 1970. He continued his teaching career in KazCTI as a senior lecturer, then head of department and faculty dean (1970–1982). Murat defended his doctorate thesis in Moscow in 1981 and received his academic rank of a Professor the same year. Since 1982 he worked as Vice-Rector of Karaganda State University, Director of the Institute of Organic Synthesis and Coal Chemistry of the Kazakh SSR Academy of Sciences (1985–1991), Rector of the Turkestan State University named after Ahmad Yasawi (1991–1995), Minister of Education of the Republic of Kazakhstan (1995–1997), President of the International Kazakh-Turkish University named after Yasawi (1997–2001). In 2003, Murat Zhurinov became the head of the National Academy of Sciences of the Republic of Kazakhstan and held this position until 2023. He was elected a Fellow of the International Core Academy of Sciences and Humanities

== Scientific papers ==
Zhurinov is one of the leading researchers in the area of electrochemistry, he has over 800 scientific papers published in domestic and foreign journals, including 22 monographs, about 150 certificates of authorship and patents. His main scientific publications focus on the study of the electrochemical behavior of various classes of organic compounds and the development of new methods of electrochemical synthesis of physiologically active substances.

== Honors and awards ==
- Order of Parasat (2006);
- Order of the Leopard 1st Class (2022);
- Order of the Leopard 2nd Class (2016);
- Order of the Leopard 3rd Class (2011);
- Pyotr Kapitsa Gold Medal (2019);
- Gold Medal of the Academy of Sciences of the Republic of Tatarstan For Scientific Achievement (2017).
