= Kunsulu Zakariya =

Kazakh scientist

Kunsulu Zakarya
- Kazakh: Күнсұлу Закария
- Born: July 2, 1967 (age 58) work settlement Karsakpay, Ulytau District, Karaganda region, KazSSR, USSR
- Citizenship: Soviet Union; Kazakhstan
- Education: Biological safety
- Alma mater: Kazakh National Pedagogical University
- Parents: Kaliyev Dalton Zakariyevich (father); Iglikova Zhansulu Abu-Talipovna (mother)
- Awards
- Scientific career
- Institutions: Advisor to the President of Kazakhstan on science and innovation

Kunsulu Daltonqyzy Zakaryia (Kazakh: Күнсұлу Дальтонқызы Закария; born 2 July 1967) is a Kazakh researcher in biological safety, Doctor of Biological Sciences, and from April 2023 the President of the Kazakh Academy of Sciences.

Zakaryia is a developer of the QazVac (QazCovid-in) vaccine candidate against COVID-19.

== Biography ==
Born to a family of an engineer and a teacher in the town of Karsakpay (Ulytau District, Karaganda region) on July 2, 1967, Kunsulu graduated from Aktobe Paedagogical Institute in 1989. She continued her studies at Venice International University (Italy) and did an internship at K-Water (South Korea) where she developed and managed biological resources and water infrastructure. Kunsulu Zakaria entered the world ranking of women who have made the greatest contribution to the development of vaccination against COVID-19.

== Career ==
Zakarya’s academic career began at the Ospanov Medical Academy, where she worked her way up from assistant lecturer to head of the department of natural sciences. In 2003, after receiving the title of professor, she alternately headed departments at three universities in Kazakhstan.

2006 saw the start of Ms. Zakarya’s civil service as she joined the Central Office of the Ministry of Environmental Protection. Having held leading positions at various public scientific enterprises in Kazakhstan between 2008 and 2022, she came to the helm of QazBioPharm in August 2022.

In April 2023, President Tokayev appointed her the Head of the Academy of Sciences of Kazakhstan.

Zakarya has authored numerous scientific publications and inventions. Two recombinant and one subunit vaccines against coronavirus infection have been developed under her guidance.

On January 22, 2024, she was appointed Advisor to the President of Kazakhstan on science and Innovation.

On September 25, 2025, she was relieved of her post as Advisor to the President of the Republic of Kazakhstan on science and Innovation.

== Public activities ==
She takes an active part in Kazakhstan’s public life, is a member of the National Kurultai, Presidential Council on Science and Technology, Amanat Party Political Council, the Board of Directors of Kazakh National University, and the editor-in-chief of Biosafety and Biotechnology Journal.

== Awards ==
- People’s Gratitude medal in Kazakhstan (2020);
- Al-Farabi Science and Technology State Award (2021);
- Best Engineer of the Year (2020);
- Honored Inventor of the Republic of Kazakhstan (2022).
