= Askar Dzhumadildayev =

Kazakh mathematician and physicist (born 1956)

- Born: Askar Serkululy Dzhumadildayev; 25 February 1956 (age 70); Kentau, Turkistan Oblast, Kazakhstan
- Education: Moscow State University
- Awards: State Prize of Kazakhstan (2011); Humboldt Fellowship (1995-1996); Khwarizmi International Award (2012); TWAS Fellow (2018)
- Scientific career
- Fields: Mathematics, algebra
- Workplaces: Kazakh-British Technical University; Institute of Mathematics and Mathematical Modeling
- Thesis: Сohomologies of Lie algebras of positive characteristic and their applications (1988)
- Doctoral advisor: Alexei Kostrikin

Askar Dzhumadildayev (Kazakh: Асқар Серқұлұлы Жұмаділдаев, Asqar Serqūlūly Jūmadıldaev; born 25 February 1956) is a Kazakh mathematician, doctor of physics and mathematics, professor, and a Full Member of the Kazakhstan National Academy of Science. He was also member Supreme Council of Kazakh SSR and Republic of Kazakhstan.

== Biography ==
=== Early life ===
Askar Serkululy Dzhumadilyavev was born on 25 February 1956 in Shieli, Kyzylorda Region, Kazakhstan. He was the member of the 51st IMO Jury.

== Scientific degrees ==
- 1977 – M.A. in mathematics (Moscow State University)
- 1981 – Ph.D. in mathematics (Steklov Institute of Mathematics)
- 1988 – second Ph.D. in mathematics (Steklov Institute of Mathematics)
- 1990 – Professor of Kazakh State University
- 1995 – Corresponding Member of the National Kazakh Academy of Sciences
- 2004 – Full Member of the National Kazakh Academy of Sciences

== Professional experience ==
- 1980-90 Junior, senior, leading Researcher of the Institute of Mathematics, Kazakh SSR Academy of Sciences.
- 1990– Head of algebra laboratory
- He has online course "Matrices and Determinants"(Kazakh: «Матрицалар және анықтауыштар») at openU.kz.

=== Visiting positions ===
- 1988 – University of Hamburg (2 months)
- 1995-1996 – LMU Munich (18 months)
- 1997, 1998, 1999 – Bielefeld University (4 months)
- 1997 – Newton Institute, Cambridge, UK (lent term, 4 months)
- 1998, 2001, 2002, 2003 – International Centre for Theoretical Physics (Trieste, 9 months)
- 1998, 1999 – Mittag-Leffler Inst. of Mathematics, Sweden (9 months)
- 1999 – Kyoto University, Japan (1 month)
- 2000-2001, 2002, 2003 – Stockholm University, Sweden (6 months)
- 2000 – University of Oxford, UK (1 month)
- 2001 – Fields Institute, Toronto (1 month)
- 2001, 2002, 2003, 2005 – Institut des Hautes Études Scientifiques, France (5 months)
- 2002 – Erwin Schrödinger International Institute for Mathematical Physics, Vien (1 month)
- 2005 – Max-Planck Institute fuer Mathematik, Bonn (3 months)

== Awards and grants ==
1983 – Prize of Republic Counsel for Science and Technology
1993–1995 – Grants of American Mathematical Society, International Science Foundation (Soros Foundation) INTAS (International association for the Promotion of Cooperation with Scientists from former USSR)
1995–1996 – Alexander von Humboldt Fellowship
1999–2004 – Grant of Swedish Royal Academy of Sciences
1999 – Grant of JSPS (Japan Soc. Promotion of Sciences)
2000–2003 – Grant of INTAS
2000–2004 – Kazakh State Fellowship for distinguished scholars
2007, 2016 – Grant of Kazakh Ministry of Education "Best professor of Higher School"
2011–2012 – Kazakh State Fellowship for distinguished scholars
2011 – State Prize of the Republic of Kazakhstan in science and technology
2012 – International Khwarizmi Award (Islamic Republic of Iran)

== Recognition ==
In 2016, Askar Dzhumadilyavev was chosen as one of the nominees in the "Science" category of the national project «El Tulgasy» (Name of the Motherland) The idea of the project was to select the most significant citizens of Kazakhstan whose names are now associated with the achievements of the country. More than 350,000 people voted in this project, and Dzhumadilyavev was voted into second place in his category.

== Selected publications ==
- Dzhumadildaev A.S., Yeliussizov D., Walks, partitions, and normal ordering // Electronic J. Combin., 22(4)(2015), \#P4.10, 23 pages.
- Dzhumadildaev A.S., Yeliussizov D., Path decompositions of digraphs and their applications to Weyl algebra // Advances in Applied Mathematics. – 2015. – V. 67. – P. 36–54.
- Dzhumadildaev A. S., Ismailov N. A., S-n- and GL(n)-module structures on free Novikov algebras // Journal of Algebra. – 2014. – V. 416. – P. 287–313.
- Dzhumadildaev A.S., 2p-Commutator on differential operators of order p // Letters in Mathematical Physics. – 2014. – V. 104, No.7. – P. 849–869.
- Dzhumadildaev A.S., Omirov B.A., Rozikov U.A. On a class of evolution algebras of "chicken" population // International Journal of Mathematics. – 2014. – V. 25, No.8. – P. 849–869.
- Dzhumadildaev A.S., Yeliussizov D., Stirling permutations on multisets // European Journal of Combinatorics. – 2014. – V. 36. – P. 377–392.
- Dzhumadildaev A.S., The Dynkin theorem for multi linear Lie elements // Journal of Lie Theory. – 2013. – V. 23, No.3. – P. 795–801.
- Dzhumadildaev A.S., D. Yeliussizov, Power sums of binomial coefficients // J. Integer Seq.V. 16–2013, art. 13.1.4
- Dzhumadildaev A.S., Zusmanovich P., The alternative operad is not Koszul // Experimental Mathematics. – 2011. – V. 20, No.2. – P. 138–144.
- Dzhumadildaev A. S. Worpitzky identity for multipermutations // Mathematical Notes – 2011. – V. 90, No.3. – P. 448–450.
- Dzhumadildaev A.S., Lie expression for multi-parameter Klyachko idempotent // Journal of Algebraic Combinatorics. – 2011. – V. 33, No.4. – P. 531–542.
- Dzhumadildaev A.S., Codimension growth and non-Koszulity of Novikov operad // Communications in Algebra. – 2011. – V. 39, No.8. – P. 2943–2952.
- Dzhumadildaev A.S., Jordan elements and left-center of a free Leibniz algebra // Electronic Research Announcements in Mathematical Sciences. – 2011. – V. 18, – P. 31–49.
- Dzhumadildaev, N. Ismailov, K. Tulenbaev, Free bicommutative algebras // Serdica Math, V. 37-2011- pp. 25–44.
- Dzhumadildaev A.S., Zusmanovich P., Commutative 2-cocycles on Lie algebras // Journal of Algebra. – 2010. – V. 324, No.4. – P. 732–748.
- Dzhumadildaev A.S., On the Hesse-Muir formula for the determinant of the matrix A (n-1) B (2) // Mathematical Notes. – 2010. – V. 87, No.3. – P. 428–429.
- Dzhumadildaev A.S., MacMahon's theorem for a set of permutuations with given descent indices and right-maximal records // Electronic Journal of Combinatorics. – 2010. – V. 17, No.1. – R34.
- Dzhumadildaev A.S., Anti-commutative algebras with skew-symmetric identities // Journal of Algebra and its Applications. – 2009. – V. 8, No.2. – P. 157–180.
- Dzhumadildaev A.S., 10-commutators, 13-commutators and odd derivations // Journal of Nonlinear Mathematical Physics. – 2008. – V. 15, No.1. – P. 87–103.
- Dzhumadildaev A.S., q-Leibniz algebras // Serdica Math. J., V.34 - 2008, 415–440.
- Dzhumadildaev A.S., Algebras with skew-symmetric identity of degree 3 // J.Math. Sci, V.161-2009- No.1, p. 11-30
- Dzhumadildaev A.S., K.M. Tulenbaev, Exceptional 0-Alia Algebras // J. Math. Sci., V.161-2009- No.1, p. 37-40.
- Dzhumadildaev A.S., The n-Lie property of the Jacobian as a condition for complete integrability // Siberian Mathematical Journal. – 2006. – V. 47, No.4. – P. 643–652.
- Dzhumadildaev A.S., Tulenbaev K.M., Engel theorem for Novikov algebras // Communications in Algebra. – 2006. – V. 34, No.3. – P. 883–888.
- Dzhumadildaev A.S., n-Lie structures that are generated by Wronskians // Siberian Mathematical Journal. – 2005. – V. 46, No.4. – P. 601–612.
- Dzhumadildaev A.S., Zinbiel algebras under q-commutator // Fundamental and Applied Math. V.11-2005- No.3, 57–78.
- Dzhumadildaev A.S., Tulenbaev K.M., Nilpotency of Zinbiel algebras // Journal of Dynamical and Control Systems. – 2005. – V. 11, No.2. – P. 195–213.
- Dzhumadildaev A.S., Hadamard invertible matrices, n-scalar products, and determinants // Mathematical Notes. – 2005. – V. 77, No.3. – P. 440–443.
- Dzhumadildaev A.S., Special identity for Novikov-Jordan algebras // Communications in Algebra. – 2005. – V. 33, No.5. – P. 1279–1287.
- n-Lie Structures That Are Generated by Wronskians //Sibirskii Matematicheskii Zhurnal, V.46-2005, No. 4, pp. 759–773, 2005 =engl. transl. Siberian Mathematical Journal, {\bf 46}(2005), No.4, pp. 601 – 612= Preprint available math.RA/0202043
- Dzhumadildaev A.S., Representations of vector product n-Lie algebras // Communications In Algebra. – 2004. – V. 32, No.9. – P. 3315–3326.
- Dzhumadildaev A.S. N-commutators // Commentarii Mathematici Helvetici. – 2004. – V. 79, No.3. – P. 516–553.
- Dzhumadildaev A.S., K.M. Tulenbaev Filiform Leibniz dual algebras // International Conference Humboldt-Kolleg II, October 24–16, 2004, p. 62-63.
- Dzhumadildaev A.S., Novikov-Jordan algebras // Communications In Algebra. – 2002. – V. 30, No. 11. – P. 5207–5240.
- Dzhumadildaev A.S. Identities and derivations for Jacobian algebras//"Quantization, Poisson brackets and beyond", Contemp. Math. v.315, 245–278, 2002. Preprint available math.RA/0202040
- Dzhumadildaev A.S., C. Lofwall Trees, free right-symmetric algebras, free Novikov algebras and identities // Homology, Homotopy and Applications, V. 4–2002, No.2(1), 165–190.
- Dzhumadildaev A.S., Jacobson formula for right-symmetric algebras in characteristic p // Communications In Algebra. – 2001. – V. 29, No.9. – P. 3759–3771.
- Dzhumadildaev A.S., Abdykassymova S.A., Leibniz algebras in characteristic p // Comptes Rendus de l'Académie des Sciences Série I-Mathématique. – 2001. – V. 332, No. 12. – P. 1047–1052.
- Dzhumadildaev A.S., Davydov A.A., Factor-complex for Leibniz cohomology // Communications In Algebra. – 2001. – V. 29, No. 9. – P. 4197–4210.
- Dzhumadildaev A.S., Minimal identities for right-symmetric algebras // Journal of Algebra. – 2000. – V. 225, No.1. – P. 201–230.
- Dzhumadildaev A.S., A.I. Kostrikin, Modular Lie algebras: new trends // Algebra (Proc. Kurosh Conf. may, 1998), Walter de Gruyter, p. 181-203, 2000.
- Dzhumadildaev A.S., Cohomologies of colour Leibniz algebras: pre-simplicial approach // Lie Theory and its Applications III, (Clausthal, 11–14 July 1999), World Sci., 124–136, 2000.
- Dzhumadildaev A.S., Cohomologies and deformations of right-symmetric Algebras // J.Math. Sci, V. 93–1999, No. 6, 1836–1876. Preprint available math.DG/9807065.
- Dzhumadildaev A.S., Symmetric (co)homologies of Lie algebras // Comptes Rendus de l'Académie des Sciences - Series I - Mathematique. – 1997. – V. 324, No. 5. – P. 497–502.
- Dzhumadildaev A.S. Cosmologies and deformations of semiprime sum of Lie algebras // Doklady Akademii Nauk. – 1997. – V. 355, No. 5. – P. 586–588.
- Dzhumadildaev A.S., Virasoro Type Lie algebras and deformations // Zeitschrift für Physik C-Particles and Fields.¬ – 1996. – V. 72, No. 3. – P. 509–517.
- Dzhumadildaev A.S., Odd central extensions of Lie superalgebras // Functional Analysis and its Applications. – 1995. – V.29, No.3. – P.202–204.
- Dzhumadildaev A.S. Differentiations and central extensions of Lie algebra of formal pseudo-differential operators // Algebra i Analis, {\bf 6}(1994), No.1, p. 140-158=engl.transl. St.Petersbourg Math.J. {\bf 6}(1995), No.1, p. 121-136.
- Dzhumadildaev A.S., Central extensions of infinite-dimensional Lie-algebras // Functional Analysis and its Applications. – 1992. – V. 26, No.4. – P.247–253.
- Dzhumadildaev A.S., Cohomology of truncated coinduced representations of Lie-algebras of positive characteristic // Mathematics of the USSR-Sbornik. – 1990. – V. 66, No.2. – P.461–473.
- Dzhumadildaev A.S. Integral and mod p-cohomologies of the lie-algebra W1 // Functional Analysis and its Applications. – 1988. – V. 22, No.3. – P. 226–228.
- Dzhumadildaev A.S. On a Levi theorem for lie-algebras of characteristic-p // Russian Mathematical Surveys. – 1986. – V. 41, No.5. – P. 139–140.
- Dzhumadildaev A.S. 2-cohomologies of nilpotent subalgebra of Zassenhaus algebra // Izvestiya vysshikh uchebnykh zavedenii Matematika. – 1986. – No.2. – P. 59– 61.
- Dzhumadildaev A.S., Central extensions of Zassenhaus algebra and their irreducible representations // Math.USSR Sb., V. 54–1986, p.;457-474.
- Dzhumadildaev A.S., Generalized casimir elements // Mathematics of the USSR-Izvestiya. – 1986. – V. 49, No.5. – P. 391–400.
- Dzhumadildaev A.S. Central extensions of the zassenhaus algebra and their irreducible representations // Mathematics of the USSR-Sbornik. – 1985. – V.126, No.3. – P. 457–474.
- Dzhumadildaev A.S., Simple Lie-algebras with a subalgebra of codimension one // Russian Mathematical Surveys. – 1985. –V. 40, No.1. – P. 215– 216.
- Dzhumadildaev A.S., On the cohomology of modular Lie-algebras // Mathematics of the USSR-Sbornik. – 1982. – V. 119, No. 1. – P. 127–143.
