= Kanysh Satbayev =

Kazakh geologist (1899–1964)

- Қаныш Сәтбаев
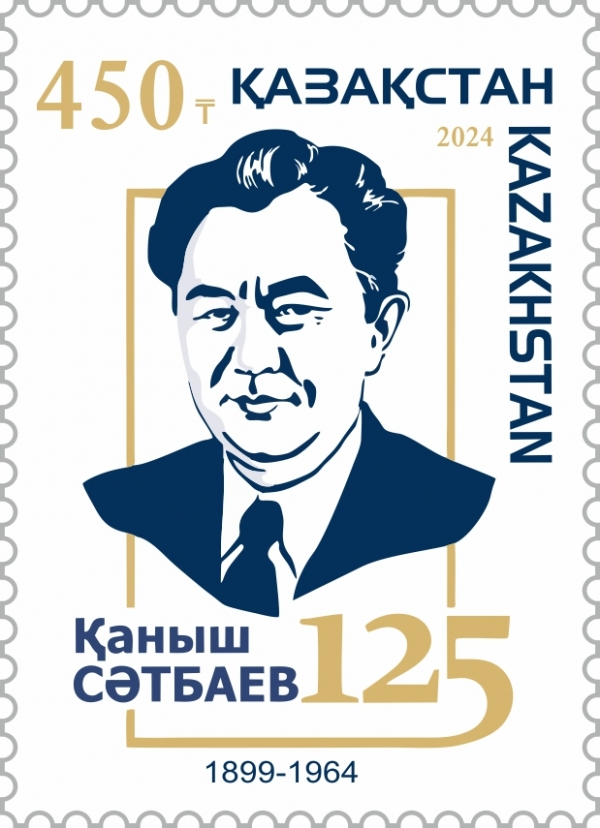
- Satbayev on a 2024 Kazakh stamp
- Born: 12 April 1899; Pavlodar uezd, Semipalatinsk Oblast, Governor-Generalship of the Steppes, Russian Empire (now Pavlodar Region, Kazakhstan)
- Died: 31 January 1964 (aged 64); Moscow, Russian SFSR, Soviet Union (now Moscow, Russia)
- Citizenship: USSR
- Education: Tomsk Polytechnic University
- Known for: First president of the Kazakhstan Academy of Sciences
- Awards: Order of Lenin (4x), Order of the Patriotic War, Lenin Prize, Stalin Prize
- Scientific career
- Fields: Geology
- Workplaces: Kazakhstan Academy of Sciences

Kanysh Imantayuli Satbayev (Note: Kazakh: Қаныш Имантайұлы Сәтбаев, romanized: Qanyş İmantaiūly Sätbaev, IPA: [qɑŋə́ʃ ɯjmɑntʰɑjʊɫɤ́ sætpájɪf]; Russian: Каныш Имантаевич Сатпаев, romanized: Kanyš Imantajevič Satpajev, IPA: [kɐˈnɨʂ ɪmɐnˈtajɪvʲɪtɕ sɐtˈpajɪf]) (Note: In some publications Satbayev is transliterated as Satpayev, as this is the official spelling in Russian.) (11 April 1899 – 31 January 1964) was a Kazakh professor, geologist and one of the founders of Soviet metallogeny (specifically the Kazakhstani school) and the principal advocate and first president of Kazakhstan Academy of Sciences.

He was a doctor of Geological and Mineralogical Sciences (1942), Professor (1950), Academy of Sciences of the Kazakh SSR (1946), member of the USSR Academy of Sciences (1946), and the first president of the Academy of Sciences of the Kazakh SSR. He is famous as the geologist who discovered the Ulutau-Dzhezkazgan copper deposit that was, at the time, amongst the largest copper reserves discovered.

== Biography ==
Satbayev was born in what is today Bayanaul District, Pavlodar Region, Kazakhstan; at the time it was in the Pavlodar district of the Semipalatinsk Region of the Kazakh SSR. Satbayev's interest in geology was sparked during his childhood by Tomsk geologist Mikhail Usov. He was the youngest child and had a brother and sister.

From 1909 to 1911, he studied at the Satpayev Kanysh aul school. In 1911 he entered the Russian-Kazakh school in the city of Pavlodar, where he graduated in 1914 with honors. After graduating from college, Satbayev, despite the objections of his father Imantai, went to study at the teachers' seminary in Semipalatinsk, where he had tuberculosis-related health problems. Nevertheless, he received a diploma from the seminary in 1918, passing an external examination.

Satbayev intended to continue his studies to obtain higher education, but people with a certificate from the seminary were accepted in high schools only if they passed the exam in mathematics and one foreign language. The next year and a half Satbayev was preparing for admission to the Tomsk Technological Institute (now Tomsk Polytechnic University). In parallel with his studies, Satbayev worked as a teacher of natural science, teaching two-year courses in Semipalatinsk.

The work and training had to be postponed due to the worsening of his tuberculosis. For almost a year Satpayev stayed in his native village, taking treatment and recuperating. It was not believed that he'd survive.

In 1920, Satbayev was appointed the first chairman in Bayanaul Kazkultprosveta (Department for the cultural and educational work among the working people), created with the strengthening of the Soviet power. At the same time by the decision of the Revolutionary Committee of Pavlodar, he was appointed a national judge of the 10th section of Bayanaul area.

At the beginning of 1921, there was a meeting with Satbayev geologist Mikhail Usov, who arrived to Bayanaul for some kumis treatment. Usov managed to interest Satbayev in geology, and in the same year, Satbayev voluntarily left his post of national judges, being admitted to the Tomsk Technological Institute.

In the beginning of 1922, the tuberculosis had escalated again, and Satbayev had to leave school and go back to the village. Not to be outdone by his fellow students, Satbayev studied from home. Usov helped him, often coming to Bayanaul for treatment.

While being treated in Bayanaul, Kanysh Satbayev began compiling a textbook on algebra for the Kazakh schools, from which he graduated in 1924. This tutorial was the first school textbook on algebra in the Kazakh language.

After a year and a half Satbayev's health improved, and he returned to his studies at the Institute, successfully graduating in 1926. Satbayev returned to Kazakhstan (the Kazakh SSR at the time) and became the first qualified ethnically Kazakh mining engineer and geologist.

He died in Moscow in 1964, and was buried in Almaty.

=== Family ===
Satbayev's father, Imantai Satbayev, was a bey (often wealthy head of a village). He had a wife Nurum, with whom he lived for more than 25 years. They had one daughter who died in infancy. This was the reason for their separation. The second wife of Imantai was called Alim. They had three children, a daughter Kaziza and two sons: Bokesh (Gaziz) and Kanysh.

In 1920, Kanysh Satbayev married Sharipa, and they had two daughters, Khanisa and Shamshiyabanu, and a son, Mailybai, who died at 16 years old. Later, having left Sharipa, Satpayev married Taisiya Alekseyevna Satpayeva (née Koshkina). They had two daughters: Maria and Meiz.

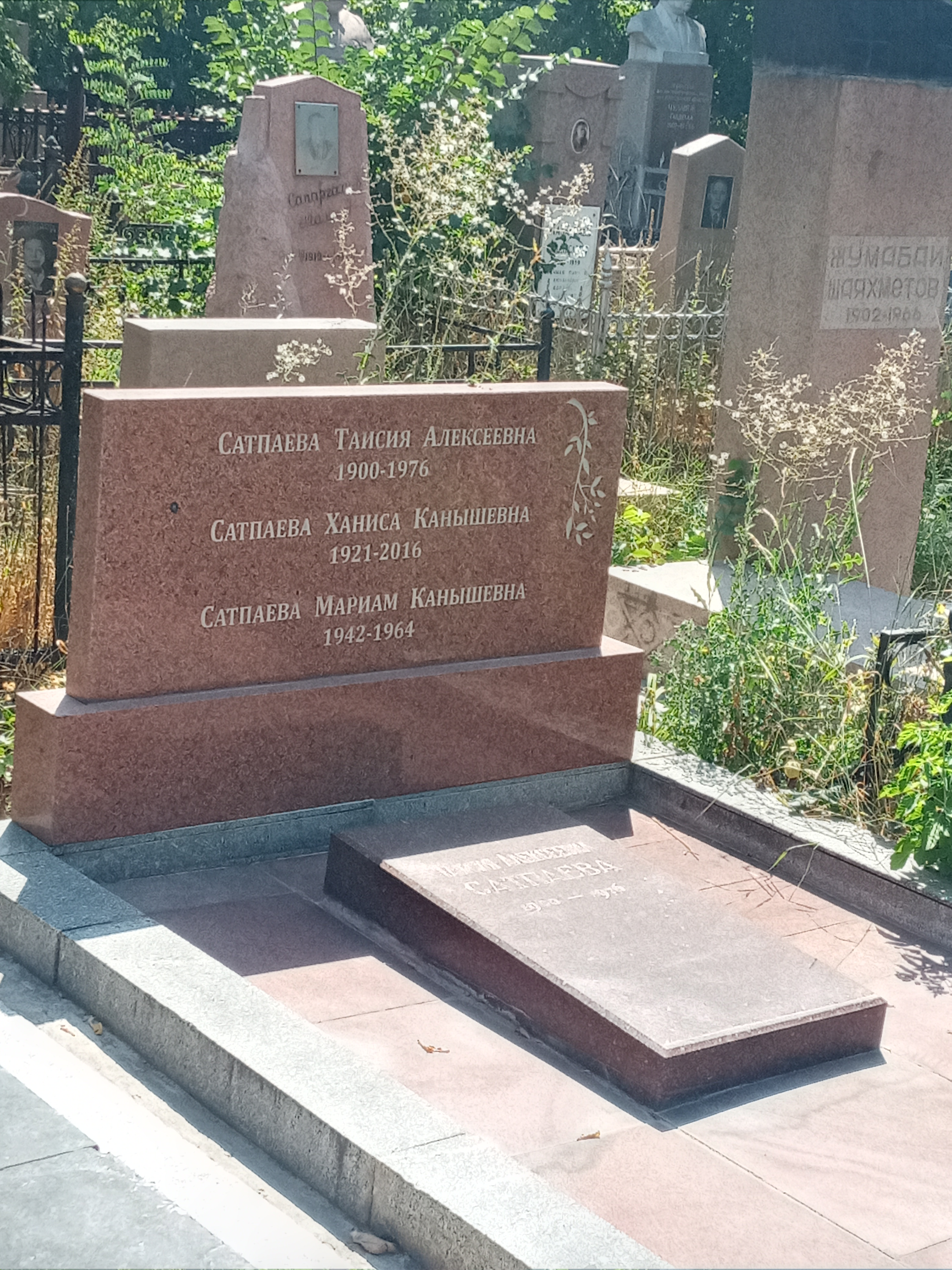
Graves of daughters Mariam, Hanisa and second wife Taisia Koshkina, the Central Cemetery, Almaty.

== Career ==
=== Research of Jezkazgan ===
In 1926, after graduating from college and getting the qualification of a mining engineer, Satbayev was sent to an Atbasar trust of non-ferrous metals as head of the geological department, and a year later, was elected a member of the Board of Trusted Members.

The jurisdiction of the trust was the Atbasar copper mine and the smelter of the unfinished Karsakpai village. Construction of the plant began a decade ago, when the British took the concession at the Karsakpaya area and began a search for copper. They built a smelter partially installed equipment, but much of the search was unsuccessful. With the onset of the February Revolution, the British left the factory, which was later decided to be finished by the Soviet regime.

Satbayev, as Chief Geologist Trust, went there to explore the area and learn about the progress of the construction works. Specialists involved in mine and factory management about the prospects of development of copper mining in the region was very skeptical. They believed that its reserves will last for the next 10 to 15 years, not more. However, examining the terrain, Satpayev did not agree with them. He believed that in the Jezkazgan (then transliterated as Dzhezkazgan) area there were huge reserves of copper, which had never been found previously. Satbayev launched a study area for the presence of metal.

A year after he began, Satbayev came across a large reservoir of ore capacity of more than ten meters. The analysis, conducted in Leningrad, showed that it was a previously unknown ore layer rich in copper. Thanks to this discovery, Satbayev was able to expand exploration work in 1928, increasing the number of machines to two. Finding three more large deposits, the geologist increased the amount of research on the second half of the year 1929. This year opened three more deposits and one new ore field. In these circumstances, Satbayev published in the journal "The national economy of Kazakhstan," an article that states that Jezkazgan may represent one of the richest provinces of copper in the world, larger than most provinces of the United States. Based on his assumptions, Satbayev concludes that the plant located near Karsakpay would not master the volume produced in the Jezkazgan ore. He also suggested that the region needed a dam and a broad-gauge railway. He came to the higher authorities with all the suggestions, appearing in the media, and even proposed the development of the region in the five-year plan of the Soviet economic development.

Satpayev's suggestions caused a negative reaction among the leadership of the trust and Geolkom. Instead of a development plan proposed by the young geologist in Jezkazgan, they offered to leave the volumes of his research in 1930. Then, Satbayev, insisting otherwise, pursued their proposals at the meeting of the mining and metallurgical sector the Supreme Economic Council. After a lengthy debate, the Supreme Economic Council agreed with the argumentation of the Geolkom and disregarded Satbayev. Not wanting to put up with the findings of the Supreme Economic Council, Satpayev got an appointment with the chairman of the Gosplan Krzhizhanovsky in the spring of 1930, where he justified his proposals. After that, the exploration of Jezkazgan allocated an additional amount of money, drilling equipment, and personnel. In the next two years, the volume of research continued to increase. Satpayev resolved the issue with the lack of water in the region: he was able to agree on the beginning of the next, hydrogeological studies in the area to search for water in 1933.

However, in early turn of the year 1933, Geolkom decides on a sharp reduction in the funding. It was only by one percent from last year's amount. The argument in favor of this decision was the lack of any infrastructure in the region: there was no iron, no roads, no water, and none of the many other basic living conditions. In order to maintain his staff and continuing his work, Satbayev was forced to seek additional sources of funding. He made an agreement with the Zolotorazvedka and Lakokrassyryo. However, the available funds were not enough to save either, much less to increase research. Satbayev appealed to the Mikhail Usov and his friend, professor Vladimir Vanyukov.

With their help, Satbayev was able to speak in the Soviet Academy of Sciences and prove the validity of the conclusions made by him concerning reserves of Jezkazgan copper ore. The decision of the third session of the Academy in 1934 referred to the need for construction of the third five-year plan in the Jezkazgan copper-smelting plant. The meeting also supported the proposal of Satbayev on construction of the railway line Jezkazgan Karagandy-Balkhash. Then, Satbayev substantiated their proposals before the people's commissar of heavy industry Sergo Ordzhonikidze. After that, extensive research began. Later, it turned out that the Jezkazgan copper deposit was, at that time, the largest in the world in terms of the projected reserves. By 1940, the Dosmurzinskoye dam in the city and the railway connecting Jezkazgan, Balkhash and Karaganda were built.

For his services in disclosing the wealthy Ulutau area (opening the Jezkazgan deposit), Satbayev was awarded the country's highest award, the Order of Lenin in 1940.

=== As President of the Kazakh Academy of Sciences ===
Kanysh Satbayev began to reflect on the creation of the Academy of Sciences of Kazakh SSR more in 1944. In the August of that year, preparatory activities were initiated alongside the actively conducted correspondence with the Department of Science of the Central Committee of the Communist Party of the Soviet Union. Satpayev regularly made trips to Moscow, where he argued for the need of the organization of the Academy of Sciences of the Kazakh SSR as a branch of the Academy of Sciences of the USSR and the Department of Science of the CPSU. In the period from 1944 to 1946, 11 new research institutes were created. The design of the future main building of the now-planned academy has also been developed, authored by architect Alexey Shchusev.

On 1 June 1946, the official opening ceremony of the Academy of Sciences of the Kazakh SSR took place in the Opera and Ballet Theatre building. Two days later, on 3 June, at the first general meeting of the Academy held in the hall of the Presidium of the Supreme Soviet of the Kazakh SSR sessions, Satbayev was elected its first president and member. In the same year, Satbayev was elected a member of the Academy of Sciences of the USSR and a deputy of the Supreme Soviet of the 2 convocation. In 1947, he was elected member of the Presidium of the Committee on Lenin and State Prizes of the USSR Council of Ministers, and remained there until his death.

In 1949, Satbayev was elected a member of the Communist Party of Kazakhstan. In 1950, he was confirmed to have the academic rank of professor in the specialty of geology and was elected to the Supreme Soviet of the 3 convocation. In 1951, Satbayev, on behalf of the Presidium of the USSR Academy of Sciences, attended the organizational session of the Academy of Sciences of the Tajik SSR. During this session, Satbayev was also elected an honorary member of the Tajik Academy of Sciences.

=== Life after dismissal ===
After Satbayev was dismissed from his post as head of the Academy of Sciences of the Kazakh SSR, the president of the Union Academy Nesmeyanov suggested that he take the post of chairman of the Ural Branch of the USSR Academy of Sciences. However, Satbayev refused and preferred to stay in Alma-Ata (now Almaty) with the position of Director in the Institute of Geological Sciences.

Back in 1942 in the Geological Institute, he had the idea of drawing up metallogenic prediction maps of minerals of Central Kazakhstan. In 1952, Satbayev gathered a group of geologists and began the implementation of this idea. The group consisted of Ramazan Borukayev, Ivan Bock, Georgy Medoev, Grigory Szczerba, Dmitry Kazanli, Ivan Novokhatskiy, and others.

In the first year of the research, the group of scientists led by geologist Satbayev developed the "Complex method formational metallogenic analysis and forecasting of deposits", which later served as the basis for comprehensive metallogenic studies in the USSR. In 1953, they amounted to operating models predictive cards. Also, in parallel with the research and development, regular conferences to discuss progress and future plans of action were held in Almaty. In 1954, the final conference, the results of which completed the entire forecast map.

Over the next four years, from 1954 to 1958, the maps were checked for accuracy and quality. The final results were announced in December 1958: a forecast map, developed by the Institute of Geological Sciences of the Kazakh SSR was recognized as the most accurate. In this regard, a group of geologists led by Satbayev was awarded the Lenin Prize.

== Legacy ==
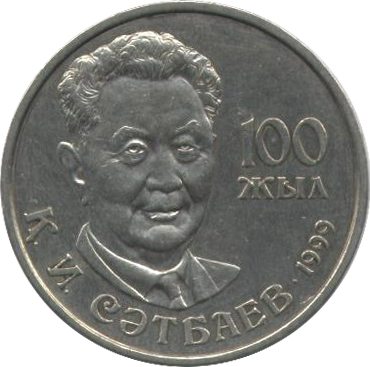
Kazakh coin commemorating Satpayev, 1999

Satbayev has made more than 640 scientific publications. He created the Institute of Geology, which became the center of studies of the mineral resources in Kazakhstan (then Kazakh SSR).

Things named after Satpayev:

- Satbayev city, Ulytau Region
- Kanysh Satbayev Canal (Irtysh–Karaganda Canal)
- the Satbayevite (6Al (OH)_{3}×3v (O_{2}OH)×2v O(OH)_{2}) mineral
- Kazakh National Technical University
- Numerous streets and schools in Kazakhstan.
- Asteroid 2402 Satbayev (1979 OR13) in the main-belt
- The mountain peak previously called the Soviets Peak (Pik Sovetov, 4317 m, GPS: 43.023914, 77.037141).
- Satbayev glacier on the northern slope of the ridge Dzungarian Alatau, the source of the river Lepsy.
- Institute of Geological Sciences of the Academy of Sciences of Kazakhstan.
- Ekibastuz Engineering and Technical Institute.
- Satbayev University (22 September 1999).
- Satbayev Street in the city of Almaty.
- Satbayev Memorial Museum.
- Street in the city of Pavlodar.
- Mining ring structure, the Satbayev big ring.

Today there is a large number of monuments dedicated Kanysh Satpaev.

== Awards, and decorations ==
- 1940, 1945, 1957, 1963 — 4 Orders of Lenin.
- 1942 — Order of the Patriotic War, 2nd degree.
- 1945 — For Valiant Labour in the Great Patriotic War 1941–1945 medal.
- 1942 — USSR State Prize.
- 1958 — Lenin Prize.
- 1951 — honorary member of the Academy of Sciences of the Tajik SSR.
- 1964 — The first honorary citizen of Jezkazgan.
- 1977 — The first honorary Citizen of Satbayev.

== Bibliography ==
Publications in English

- Satpaev K.I. Program of Kazakh scientists // Moscow News. 1948. 28 Dec.
- Satpaev K.I. Gigantic strides: (Our party looks into the future) // Moscow News. 1956. 22 Feb.
- Satpaev K.I. Kazakhstan: Tremendous advances // News. 1956. No. 24. P. 21.
- Satpaev K.I. Kazakh scientists contribution // Moscow News. 1959. 4 Mar. P. 6.

== About him ==
- Satpaev Kanysh Imantaevich // The International who's who. 1963–1964. 27 ed. London: Europa publ., 1963. P. 937.

== Notes ==
Preceded by Dinmukhamed Konayev	President Kazakh Academy of Sciences; 1955–1964	Succeeded by Shafik Chokin
Preceded by First president	President Kazakh Academy of Sciences; 1946–1952	Succeeded by Dinmukhamed Konayev
