= Maya Shigaeva =

Soviet and Kazakhstan scientist

- Born: Astrakhan, RSFSR, USSR
- Died: February 20, 2017 (90 years old); Almaty, Kazakhstan
- Citizenship: (Soviet Union) USSR, Kazakhstan
- Education: Kazakh State Medical Institute
- Awards: Honored Scientist of the Kazakh SSR (1977)

Maya Khazhetdinkyzy Shigaeva (Kazakh: Майя Хажетдинқызы Шығаева, Maiia Hajetdinqyzy Şyğaeva; November 21, 1927, Astrakhan, the RSFSR, the USSR - February 20, 2017, Alma-Ata, Kazakhstan) - Soviet and Kazakhstan scientist, microbiologist, Doctor of Biological Sciences (1970) professor (1977), academician of the National Academy of Sciences of the Republic of Kazakhstan (2003). Honored Scientist of the Kazakh SSR (1977).

== Biography ==
Shigaeva Maya Khazhetdinovna was born on January 21, 1927, in the city of Astrakhan.

She graduated from Aktobe secondary school in 1944. From 1944 to 1949 she was a student of the medical faculty of the Kazakh State Medical Institute. From 1949 to 1952 she was a student of the microbiology sector of the Academy of Sciences of the Kazakh SSR.

She received her Doctor of Biological Sciences in 1970, became a professor 1977 and became an Academician of NAS RK in 2003.

== Labor activity ==
- 1949 - 1952 student of the Academy of Sciences of the Kazakh SSR
- 1952 - 1956 Senior Laboratory Assistant, Junior Researcher.
- 1956 - 1962 Scientific Secretary of the Institute of Microbiology and Virology of the Kazakh SSR.
- 1957 - 1959 deputy of the district council.
- 1960 - 1963 Senior Researcher at the Laboratory “Microorganism Variability”.
- 1963 - 1972 Deputy Director of the Institute of Microbiology and Virology of the Kazakh SSR and Head of the Laboratory "Genetics of Microorganisms and Breeding"
- 1972 - 2000 Head of the Department of Microbiology, Kazakh State University S.M. Kirov (now KazNU named after Al-Farabi)
- 1975 - 1985 Dean of the Faculty of Biology, Kazakh State University S.M. Kirova.
- Since 2000 - Professor, Department of Microbiology, Faculty of Biology, KazNU named after Al-Farabi

== Scientific activity ==
The head and scientific consultant of three scientific projects carried out under the program of the Central Design Bureau of the Ministry of Education and Science of the Republic of Kazakhstan:

1. "Assessment of the physiological and biochemical status and bioremediation activity of activated sludge and soil organisms to develop effective wastewater treatment systems and disturbed ecosystems."
2. “Creation of microbial express - methods for assessing the integral toxicity of oil-contaminated soils and the specific remedying ability of various strains of microorganisms”
3. “To develop methodological foundations for the selection of promising microorganisms-destructors of individual polycyclic aromatic hydrocarbons”.

Published over 350 works. Prepared 42 candidates and 10 doctors of sciences.

== Awards and honors ==
=== Awards ===
- 1960 - Certificate of Merit of the Supreme Council of the Kazakh SSR
- 1977 - Awarded the title "Honored Scientist of the Kazakh SSR"
- 1981- Fulbright Scholar
- 1986 - Honorary diploma of entry in the "Golden Book of the Republic of Kazakhstan"
- 1995 - received a state scholarship from the Foundation of the President of the Republic of Kazakhstan
- 1997 - awarded the badge of the Ministry of Education and Science of the Republic of Kazakhstan "Excellence in Education of the Republic of Kazakhstan"
- 2000 - American Institute of Biography awarded the title "Woman of 2000"
- 2009 - awarded with a special sign “Big Gold Medal” for outstanding achievements in the field of science and education of the Republic of Kazakhstan KazNU named after Al-Farabi.

=== Order ===
In 1981 she was inducted into the Order of Friendship of Peoples. In 1996 she was inducted into the Order of Parasat.

=== Medals ===
- 1970 - Medal "In commemoration of the 100th anniversary of the birth of Vladimir Ilyich Lenin"
- 1989 - Medal "Veteran of Labor"
- 2001 - Medal "10 years of independence of the Republic of Kazakhstan"
- 2008 - Medal "10 years of Astana"

=== Legacy ===
A scholarship given to university students has been named in honor of Maya Khazhetinovna Shigaeva.
