= Askar Kunaev =

Kazakh and Soviet professor and metallurgist

Askar Kunayev (Russian: Аскар Минлиахмедович Кунаев, Kazakh: Асқар Меңдіахметұлы Қонаев, Asqar Meñdıahmetūly Qonaev; 14 July 1929 — 31 March 1999) was a Kazakh and Soviet professor, metallurgist, and the president of the Kazakh Academy of Sciences from 1974 to 1986.

== Biography ==
Kunayev was born on 14 July 1929, in Alma-ata, Kazakh Autonomous Socialist Soviet Republic, today known as Almaty, Kazakhstan. He graduated from the National University of Science and Technology (MISiS) in 1951. He was the brother of Dinmukhamed Kunaev and married to Mukhtar Auezov's daughter Leila. He was a full member of the USSR Academy of Sciences and President of the Academy of Sciences of the Kazakh SSR from 1974 to 1986. He died on 31 March 1999, in Almaty, Kazakhstan.
