= Ashchisay =

Ashchisay Ащысай Ащисай اششىساي
- Location within Kazakhstan
- Coordinates: 49°25′02″N 58°17′34″E
- Country: Kazakhstan
- Region: Aktobe
- Elevation: 352 m (1,155 ft)
- Time zone: UTC+5 (West Kazakhstan Time)
  - Summer (DST): UTC+5 (West Kazakhstan Time)

Ashchisay, also known as Ashisay, (Kazakh: Ащысай, Aşysai, اششىساي; Russian: Ащисай, Ashchisay) is a town in Aktobe Region, west Kazakhstan. It lies at an altitude of 352 m (1,155 ft).
