= Umirzak Sultangazin =

Soviet-Kazakh scientist

- Өмірзақ Сұлтанғазин
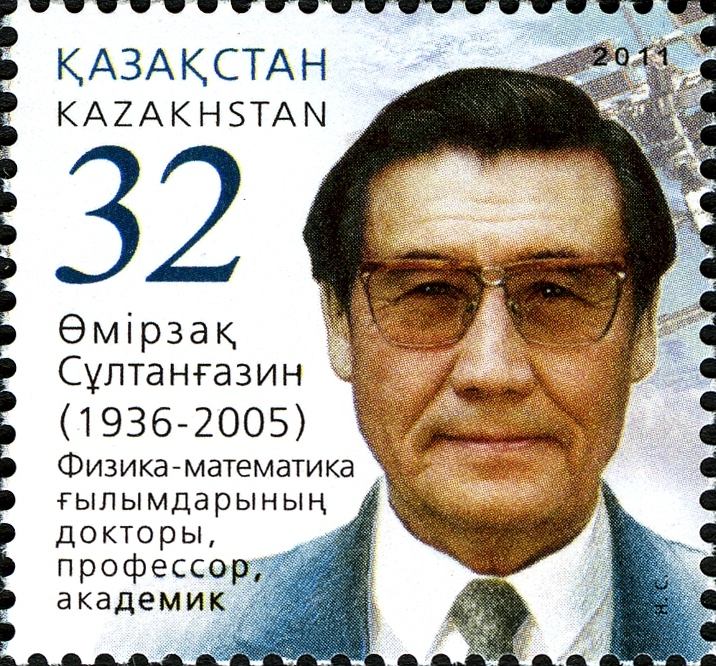
- Sultangazin on a 2011 Kazakh stamp
- Born: 4 October 1936; Qaraoba, Kostanay Region, Kazakh SSR, Soviet Union
- Died: 23 May 2005 (aged 68); Berlin, Germany
- Occupations: Doctor of Physical and Mathematical Sciences
- Awards: Order of Parasat; Order of the Red Banner of Labour

Ömırzaq Mahmūtūly Sūltanğazin (Note: Often transliterated as Umirzak Makhmutovich Sultangazin through a Russified Romanization of Умирзак Махмутович Султангазин.) (Kazakh: Өмірзақ Махмұтұлы Сұлтанғазин; 4 October 1936 – 23 May 2005) was a Soviet-Kazakh scientist, mathematician, Doctor of Physical and Mathematical Sciences (1972), professor (1974), Academician at the Kazakh SSR Academy of Sciences (1983), and an honorary member of the Russian Academy of Cosmonautics.

== Biography ==
Umirzak Sultangazin was born in the settlement of Karaoba (Sarykol District, Kostanay Region, Kazakh SSR) on 4 October 1936. After graduation from Kazakh State University in 1958 with a degree in Mathematics, Sultangazin successfully lectured until 1978 (as assistant, senior lecturer, associate professor and Computational Mathematics Chair).

In 1964 he moved to Novosibirsk to work at the Siberian Branch of the USSR Academy of Sciences, where he defended his Ph.D. thesis at the Institute of Mathematics on The splitting method for the kinetic equation of transfer. Together with Gury Marchuk, he proved the feasibility of using the splitting method for the radiative transfer equations and proved their convergence in this case. In 1968 he was hired as a senior researcher at the Computing Center of the Siberian Branch of the USSR Academy of Sciences in Novosibirsk, where he defended his doctoral dissertation on "The method of spherical harmonics for the non-stationary kinetic equation of radiation transfer" (in the field of Differential Equations) based on the results of his research. He became a Doctor of Sciences at the age of 36.

In 1978, Umirzak Sultangazin was invited to head the Institute of Mathematics and Mechanics at the Academy of Sciences of the Kazakh SSR, where he trained numerous young mathematicians. He became the President of Kazakhstan’s Academy of Sciences in 1988 and held this position until February 1994. Three regional branches of the Academy were established in the cities of Shymkent, Ust’-Kamenogorsk and Atyrau under his leadership.

On 26 March 1989 he was elected People's Deputy of the USSR by the scientists of the Academy of Sciences of the Kazakh SSR to represent the Karaganda-Oktyabrsk national-territorial electoral district No. 142 of the Kazakh SSR.

Sultangazin ran the Institute of Space Research at Kazakhstan Academy of Sciences from its establishment in 1991 (pursuant to Umirzak’s own proposal) until his death in 2005, spurring the growth of Kazakhstan’s space industry.

In 2004, Sultangazin led the implementation of the scientific and technical program titled National Space Monitoring System of the Republic of Kazakhstan. After his personal meetings with President Nazarbayev, the state program for the development of the space industry in Kazakhstan was launched.

On 23 May 2005, Umirzak Sultangazin, aged 68, passed away in a Berlin clinic after a serious illness.

== Family ==
Spouse — Raikhan Meirmanova; Children: Janat, Almas.

== Scientific legacy ==
- Spherical Harmonics Method Lectures. Alma-Ata, 1975;
- Spherical Harmonics and Discrete Ordinates Methods in the Kinetic Transfer Theory. Alma-Ata, 1979;
- Discrete Models of Nonlinear Boltzmann Equations. Alma-Ata, 1985.

== Awards and honours ==
- USSR State Award for Mathematics (1987);
- Natural Sciences Award of the Academy of Sciences of the Soviet Union and Czechoslovak Academy of Sciences (1989);
- Order of the Red Banner of Labour (1987);
- Order of Lenin for a great contribution to the application of space science in the national economy and active role in the preparation and implementation of the Soyuz TM-13 mission (1991);
- Order of Parasat (2004);

== Legacy ==
- Streets in Almaty and Kostanay are named after Sultangazin;
- A secondary school in his native district of Sarykol (former Uritsky) was named after Umirzak Sultangazin;
- Institute of Space Research of Kazakhstan’s Academy of Sciences (now JSC NTsKIT) which he previously led, was named after him in January 2011;
- A commemorative stamp was published on Sultangazin’s anniversary in October 2011;
- Kostanay State Pedagogical University (Institute since 2020) was renamed after Sultangazin in 2018;
- A memorial bust to Sultangazin was erected in front of Kostanay State Pedagogical University in May 2019.
