= Kazakhstan Academy of Sciences =

Highest scientific organization of Kazakhstan

Coordinates: 43°14′45″N 76°57′10″E

National Academy of Sciences of the Republic of Kazakhstan
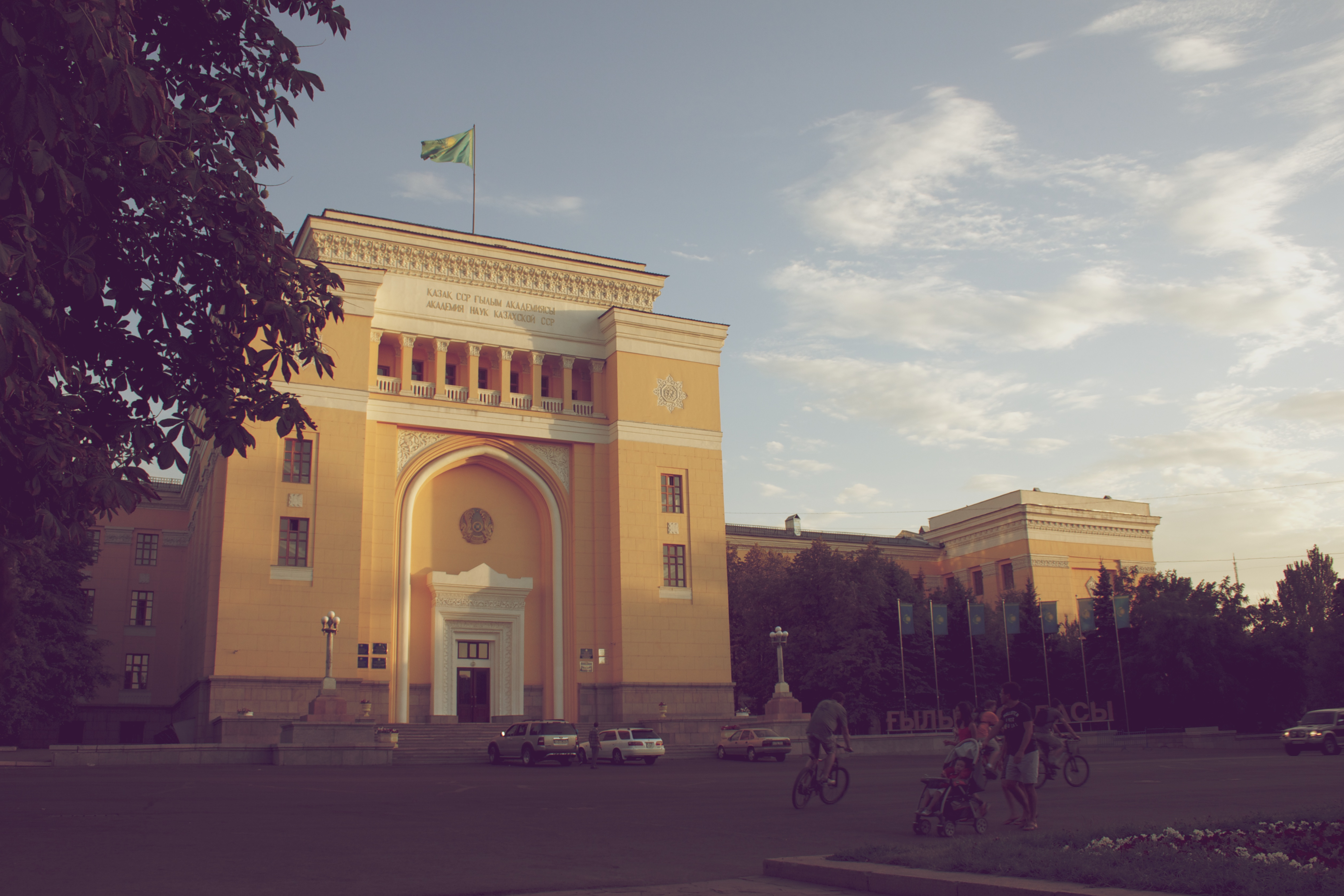
- The building of Kazakhstan Academy of Sciences in Almaty
- Other name: Қазақстан Республикасының Ұлттық ғылым академиясы Qazaqstan Respublikasynyñ Ūlltyq ğylym akademiiasy
- Established: 1946
- President: Akhylbek Kurishbayev
- Address: 050010, Shevchenko street, 28, Almaty
- Location: Kazakhstan
- Website: https://nauka-nanrk.kz/index.php/en/.html

The Kazakhstan Academy of Sciences (official name National Academy of Sciences of the Republic of Kazakhstan) is the highest scientific organization of the Republic of Kazakhstan. The Academy of Sciences was founded on 1 June 1946 on the basis of the Kazakh branch of the USSR Academy of Sciences. The central office is located in Almaty. It is a state institution that joins active members (academicians), corresponding members, and leading scientists of Kazakhstan.

The main activities of the Academy are scientific research, analysis and forecasting of the development of science, priorities of science development and scientific personnel training, support, formation, and coordination of scientific programs, promotion of international cooperation, innovation and investment in science-based development. Areas of research include earth sciences, mathematics, computer science, physics, remote sensing and space technologies, chemistry, new materials, biologically active substances, biochemistry and physiology of plants, botany, soil sciences, social sciences and humanities. The incumbent president (as of 2022) is Professor Murat Zhurinov.

== History of Academy ==
The first scientific institutions appeared in the territory of the Republic of Kazakhstan at the beginning of the 20th century. At the first stage, these were agricultural institutions that was conducting research on seed variety.

=== Kazakh branch of the USSR Academy of Sciences ===
The history of the Academy dates back to March 8, 1932, when the Presidium of the USSR Academy of Sciences, at the request of the government of the Kazakh ASSR, decided to organize a scientific base in Kazakhstan in Almaty. The new organization created in the same year included the zoological and botanical sectors. In November 1938, the base was transformed into the Kazakh branch of the USSR Academy of Sciences (KazFAN of the USSR). This was the largest institution in the republic, which employed 100 scientists, including 3 doctors and 14 candidates of sciences - before the start of World War II.

By the beginning of the 1940s, there were 12 universities, 11 research & development and design-technological organizations, 2 design institutes, 2 agricultural experimental stations, 6 factory research and design divisions, a botanical garden and a zoological park in the republic and the city of Almaty.

=== The Academy of Sciences of the KazakhSSR ===
On October 26, 1945 a resolution of the Council of People's Commissars of the USSR was issued on the organization of the Academy of Sciences in Kazakhstan. Therefore the Academy of Sciences of the Kazakh SSR was established on June 1, 1946 by decree of the Presidium of the Supreme Soviet, Council of Ministers of the Kazakh SSR and the Central Committee of the Communist Party of Kazakhstan and became the main science headquarter of the republic and the coordinator of scientific research works in Kazakhstan. From the first years of its establishment, the National Academy of Sciences of the republic launched a broad study on the development of rich natural resources, which has made a significant contribution to the development of the productive forces of the country in solving the most important problems of an economic, social and spiritual development of Kazakhstan's society.

=== National Academy of Sciences of Kazakhstan ===
In 1996, by a decree of the President of Kazakhstan, the National Academy of Sciences, the Kazakh Academy of Agricultural Sciences and the Ministry of Science and New Technologies of the Republic of Kazakhstan merged into the central executive body of the Government of the Republic of Kazakhstan - “Ministry of Science - National Academy of Sciences of the Republic of Kazakhstan”.

In 1999, the Academy of Sciences was separated from the ministry, while all academic institutions remained part of the ministry. The Academy is a public association.

In 2003, in accordance with the Decree of the President of the Republic of Kazakhstan, The Academy was given the status of the Republican private association "National academy of sciences of the Republic of Kazakhstan".

== Academy Presidents ==
- Kanysh Satbayev (1946–52, 1955–64)
- Dinmukhamed Kunaev (1952–55)
- Shafik Chokin (1964–67)
- Shahmardan Yesenov (1967–74)
- Askar Kunaev (1974–86)
- Murat Aitkhozhin (1986–87)
- Umirzak Sultangazin (1987–94)
- Kenzhegali Sagadiyev (1994–96)
- Vladimir Shkolnik (1996–99)
- Nagima Aitkhozhina (1999–2002)
- Serikbek Daukeev (2002–03)
- Murat Zhurinov (2003–2019)
- Kunsulu Zakariya (2019–2024)
- Akhylbek Kurishbayev (2024–present)

== Notable academy members ==
=== Full Members (Academians) ===
- Kanysh Satbayev — Geologist and First President.
- Mikhail Rusakov — Geologist
- Dinmukhamed Kunaev — Engineer (and later politician)
- Shafik Chokin — Power Engineer
- Nikolai Vasilievich Pavlov — Botanist
- Murat Aitkhozhin — Molecular Biologist
- Nadir Nadirov — Chemist
- Maya Shigaeva — Microbiologist
- Orazak Ismagulov — Anthropologist
- Askar Dzhumadildayev — Mathematician

=== Corresponding Members ===
- Sarsen Amanzholov — Linguist

== Academy departments ==
From the late 1980s to 1999, the structure of the Academy of Sciences included five departments (by field of science) and one regional branch of the Academy of Sciences:

=== Department of Physical and Mathematical Science ===
- Institute of Nuclear Physics
- Institute of High Energy Physics
- Institute of Theoretical and Applied Mathematics
- Fesenkov Astrophysical Institute
- Kamenskoe Plateau Observatory
- Assy-Turgen Observatory
- Tien Shan Astronomical Observatory
- Ionosphere Institute
- Physical-Technical Institute
- Institute of Mechanics and Mechanical Engineering
- Institute of Space Research
- Institute of Informatics and Control Problems

=== Department of Geological Sciences ===
- Institute of Geological Sciences named after K. Satpayev
- U. M. Ahmedsafin Institute of Hydrogeology and Geoecology
- Institute of seismology
- Institute of mining engineering
- Institute of Geography

=== Department of Chemical and Technological Sciences ===
- Institute of Metallurgy and Concentration
- A. B. Bekturov Institute of Chemical Sciences
- D. V. Sokolsky Institute of Organic Catalysis and Electrochemistry
- Institute of Petroleum Chemistry and Natural Salts

=== Department of Biological Sciences ===
- Institute of General Genetics and Cytology
- Institute of Soil Science
- Institute of Botany
- Institute of Zoology
- Institute of Microbiology and Virology
- Institute of Experimental Biology
- Institute of Physiology
- Institute of M. Aitkhozhin Molecular Biology and Biochemistry
- Main botanical garden
- Scientific Center for Regional Nutrition Problems

=== Department of Social Sciences ===
- Institute of Philosophy
- Institute of State and Law
- Institute of Economics
- Institute of History and Ethnology named after Ch. Ch. Valikhanov
- M. O. Auezov Institute of literature and art
- Baitursynov Institute of Linguistics
- Institute of Uigur science
- A. Kh. Margulan Institute of Archeology
- Center of foreign economics
- Center for Oriental Studies

=== Central Kazakhstani branch in Karaganda ===
- Chemical and Metallurgical Institute
- Institute of Organic Synthesis and Carbon Chemistry
- Institute of Physiology and Labor Hygiene
- Institute of Applied Mathematics
- Institute for Problems of Integrated Subsoil Development
